= Vijender Kumar =

Indian Professor (born 1968)

Prof. (Dr.) Vijender Kumar

Registrar, Nalsar University of Law, Hyderabad.
- In office 2013–2014

Vice-Chancellor, National Law University and Judicial Academy, Assam, (NLUJAA) Guwahati
- In office 20/10/2014–2016

Vice-Chancellor, Maharashtra National Law University, Nagpur
- In office 2016–present

Personal details
- Born: 10 June 1968 (age 58) Uttar Pradesh, India
- Education: LL.M., Kurukshetra University, Ph.D. (1995) Maharshi Dayanand University
- Occupation: Professor, Vice-Chancellor
- Profession: Teaching, Administration
- Awards: Commonwealth Fellowship (2009–2010); Meritorious Teacher Award by Govt. of Telangana (2019)

Vijender Kumar (born 10 June 1968) is a professor of Law and currently serving as the Vice-Chancellor of Maharashtra National Law University, Nagpur, a National Law University in Nagpur, Maharashtra, India. With his experience as a legal professional at Bar Council of India, and also as an Academic administrator in Indian legal realm, Kumar is regarded as one of the authorities on the subject of Family law in India.

== Education ==
Vijender Kumar received his primary school education in Chhutmalpur, a small village in the Saharanpur District of the Indian state of Uttar Pradesh. After completing his graduation and post graduation in law in 1993, Kumar went on to receive a doctoral degree in law with specialization in 'Hindu Law of Adoption' and was supervised by Prof. Ranbir Singh in 1995.

== Career ==
He has experience at the Bar prior to teaching. Kumar started his teaching career as assistant professor at the National Academy of Legal Studies and Research (NALSAR) University of Law, Hyderabad, India, where he taught family law, legal research methodology and Hindu law of adoption to undergraduate and postgraduate scholars. In 2009, Kumar received the prestigious Commonwealth Fellowship and visiting professorship at King's College London, England. In the February 2013, he was appointed as registrar of the Nalsar University of Law, where he served for more than a year.

== Contributions ==
He has worked on several projects including projects commissioned by the National Commission for Women, New Delhi on “Coparcenary Rights of Women in Andhra Pradesh”; “A Study of Law and Nanotechnology: Exploring the Dimensions for Tackling the Nanotechnology Revolution with Special Relevance to Human Rights and Environment” funded by the Shastri Indo-Canadian Institute, New Delhi; he also worked on a two-year Collaborative Research Project tilted “Non Resident Indians (NRI) Marriages: Need for a New Legal Regime” for which a grant was supported by the Department of Higher Education, Ministry of Human Resource Development, Government of India and Shastri Indo-Canadian Institute, New Delhi. Prof. Kumar has participated and presented papers in several National and International Conferences/ Seminar/ Webinars/ Conclaves. He had also participated in the Law Teachers Programme on “Law Teaching and Legal Research Skills” at Cardiff Law School, (UK) in 2004. Prof. Kumar has been and is a member of many committees of the UGC, NAAC, NIRF, NITI AAYOG, UPSC etc. and contributed to holistic growth of legal education and profession. Prof. Kumar advocates for Socratic and Cooperative Methods of teaching-learning pedagogy and ICT based techniques while helping faculty members in designing of the Course Curriculum of law and allied disciplines. For many years now, he has been a member of Board of Studies, Academic Planning and Monitoring Board, Academic Council, Executive Council, and General Council of many NLUs and other universities.

== Books ==
- Venkata Subbarao, G. C; Subba Rao, T. V; Kumar, Vijender (2006). Prof. G.C.V. Subba Rao's Family law in India: Hindu, Muslim, Christians and Parsi. Hyderabad, Andhra Pradesh: S. Gogia. OCLC 183927243.
- “Law Relating to Domestic Violence 2007”
- “Family Law in India” of Professor G.C.V. Subba Rao, (8th edition 2004, 9th edition 2007 and 10th edition 2011); and
- Vidyullatha Reddy, K; Kumar, Vijender; Balakista Reddy, V, eds. (2011). Global perspectives in consumer law. International Conference on Consumer Law. Hyderabad: S. Gogia & Co. ISBN 978-81-909684-3-0. OCLC 729012607.
- Mayne, John D; Kumar, Vijender (2014). Mayne's treatise on Hindu law & usage. Bharat Law House. ISBN 978-81-7737-230-4. OCLC 908107431.
- Sharma, Mool Chand; Kumar, Vijender; Vats, Naresh Kumar; Tiwari, Vijay Pratap (2017). Law, judiciary and governance: a festschrift in the honour of Professor (Dr.) Mool Chand Sharma. LexisNexis. ISBN 978-93-5035-983-9. OCLC 993085946.
- “Law, Judiciary and Governance 2017”
- “Women, Law and Society 2019”
- “Being A Law Teacher 2019”
- Kumar, Vijender (2019). Children, law and society. Bharti Publications. ISBN 978-93-89657-01-2. OCLC 1138896440.
- Kumar, Vijender (2020). Crime against women and law relating to welfare and protection of women. Bharti Publications. ISBN 978-93-89657-69-2. OCLC 1228505366.
- his co-edited books titled “Alternative Dispute Resolution: Prospects and Challenges 2020”,
- “Surrogacy: Law, Policy and Practice 2020”,
