= Education in Maharashtra =

Modern education was introduced to Maharashtra region during the 19th century by British colonial administration. Census of 2011 showed literacy rates in the state for males and females were around 78% and 67% respectively. Education at different levels in the state is provided by the state, government supported charities, or private institutions. There are also a number of institutes offering vocational training.

== History ==
American Marathi Mission, Scottish presbyterian missionary John Wilson, Indian nationalists such as Vasudev Balwant Phadke and Bal Gangadhar Tilak, social reformers such as Jyotirao Phule, Dhondo Keshav Karve and Bhaurao Patil all played a leading role in the setting up of modern schools and colleges during the British colonial era. The forerunner of Deccan College Post-Graduate and Research Institute was established in 1821. The Shreemati Nathibai Damodar Thackersey Women's University, the oldest women's liberal arts college in south Asia, started its journey in 1916. College of Engineering Pune, established in 1854, is the third oldest college in Asia. Government Polytechnic Nagpur, established in 1914, is one of the oldest polytechnics in India.

== Primary and secondary level ==
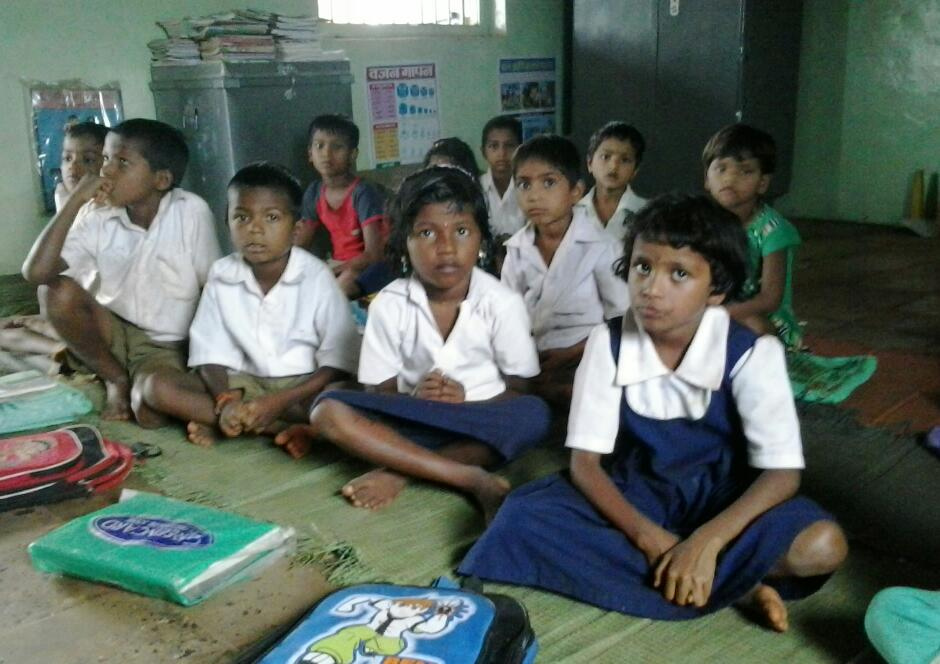
Students at a state-run primary school in Raigad district.

Maharashtra schools are run by the state government or by private organisations, including religious institutions. It is mandatory for local authorities to provide primary education under state law. However, secondary education is an optional duty. Public primary schools in the rural and urban are run by the area Zilla Parishad or the municipal corporations respectively. Private schools are run mainly by education trusts and are required to undergo mandatory inspection by the concerned authorities. Private schools are eligible for financial aid from the state government. Instruction is mainly in Marathi, English or Hindi, though Urdu is also used. Physical education is mandatory. The secondary schools are affiliated with the Council for the Indian School Certificate Examinations (CISCE), the Central Board for Secondary Education (CBSE), the National Institute of Open School (NIOS) or the Maharashtra State Board of Secondary and Higher Secondary Education. Under the 10+2+3 plan, after completing secondary school, students typically enroll for two years in a junior college, also known as pre-university, or in schools with a higher secondary facility affiliated with the Maharashtra State Board of Secondary and Higher Secondary Education or any central board. Students choose from one of three streams, namely liberal arts, commerce or science. Upon completing the required coursework, students may enroll in general or professional degree programs at colleges affiliated to a university.

== Tertiary level ==
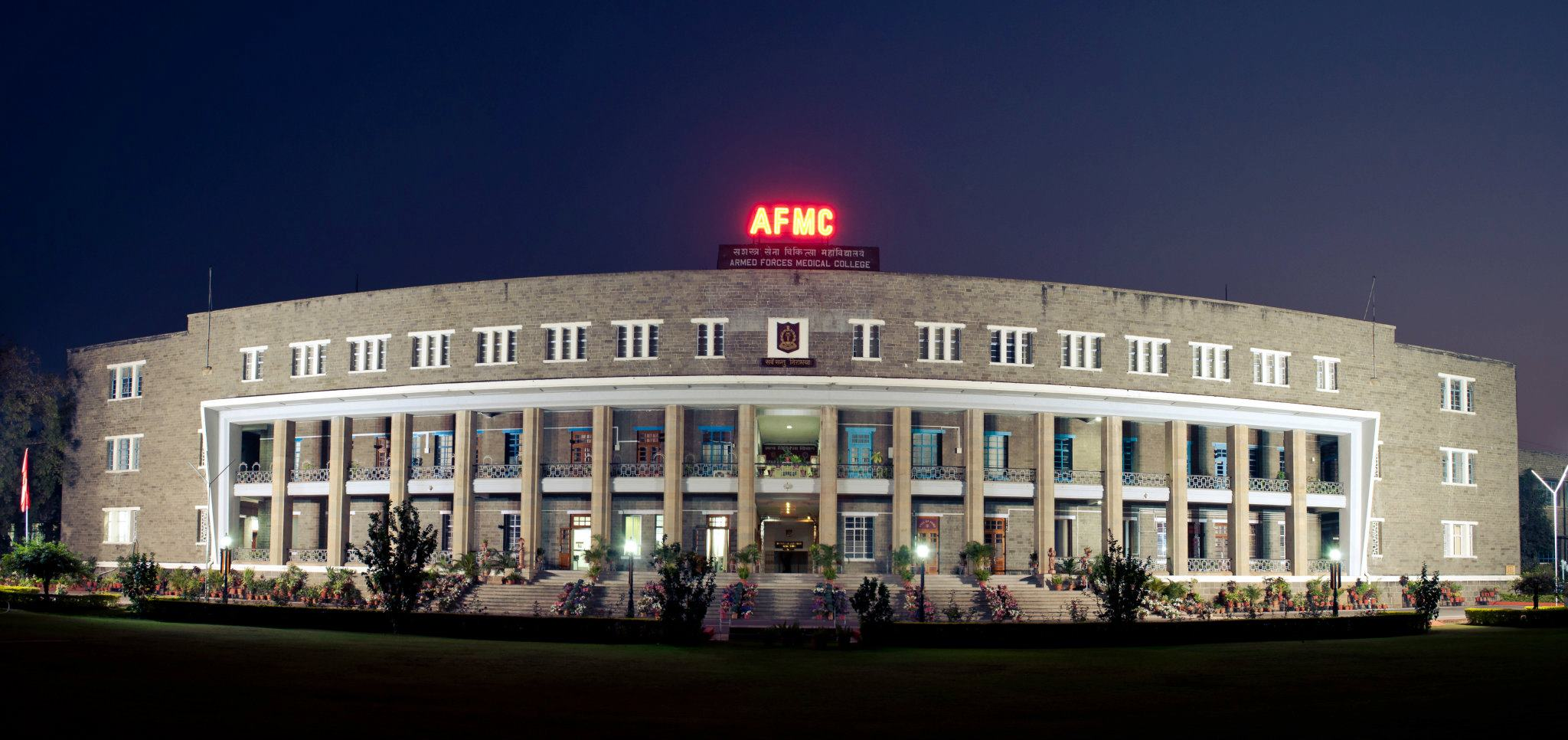
Armed Forces Medical College, Pune, was one of the institutions established after the Indian independence movement

Maharashtra has 24 universities with a turnout of 160,000 Graduates every year. Maharashtra has played a pioneering role in the development of the modern education system in India. The University of Mumbai, is the largest university in the world in terms of the number of graduates and has 141 affiliated colleges. According to prominent national rankings, 5 to 7 Maharashtra colleges and universities are ranked among the top 20 in India. Maharashtra is also home to such notable autonomous institutes as Indian Institute of Technology Bombay, College of Engineering Pune (CoEP), Dr. Babasaheb Ambedkar Technological University, Institute of Chemical Technology, Homi Bhabha National Institute, Walchand College of Engineering, Visvesvaraya National Institute of Technology (VNIT) and Veermata Jijabai Technological Institute (VJTI), Sardar Patel College of Engineering (SPCE). Most of these autonomous institutes are ranked the highest in India and have very competitive entry requirements. The University of Pune (now Savitribai Phule Pune University), the National Defence Academy, Film and Television Institute of India, Armed Forces Medical College and National Chemical Laboratory were established in Pune soon after the Indian independence in 1947. Mumbai has an IIT, has National Institute of Industrial Engineering and Nagpur has IIM and AIIMS.

Some of the notable institutes in the state are: Maharashtra National Law University, Nagpur (MNLUN), Maharashtra National Law University, Mumbai (MNLUM), Maharashtra National Law University, Aurangabad (MNLUA), Government Law College, Mumbai (GLC), ILS Law College, and Symbiosis Law School (SLS).

Maharashtra has hundreds of other private colleges and universities, including many religious and special-purpose institutions. Most of the private colleges were set up in the last forty years after the State Government of Vasantdada Patil liberalised the Education Sector in 1982. Politicians and leaders involved in the huge cooperative movement in Maharashtra were instrumental in setting up the private institutes There are also local community colleges with generally more open admission policies, shorter academic programs, and lower tuition.

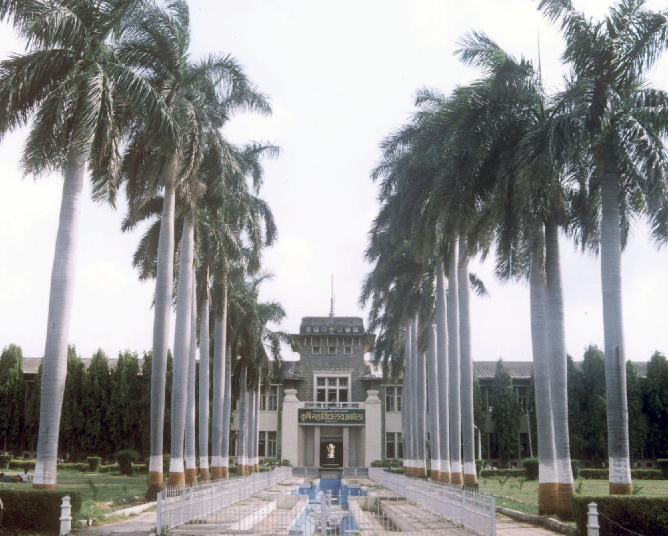
Panjabrao Deshmukh Krishi Vidyapeeth (Agricultural university) at Akola

The state also has four agricultural universities namely Vasantrao Naik Marathwada Agricultural University, Mahatma Phule Krishi Vidyapeeth, Dr. Panjabrao Deshmukh Krishi Vidyapeeth and Dr. Balasaheb Sawant Konkan Krishi Vidyapeeth, besides these, there are other regional universities like Sant Gadge Baba Amravati University, Dr. Babasaheb Ambedkar Marathwada University, North Maharashtra University, Shivaji University, Solapur University, Swami Ramanand Teerth Marathwada University and Rashtrasant Tukadoji Maharaj Nagpur University, all well established and nationally renowned, to cover the educational needs at the district levels of the state. Apart from this, there are a number of deemed universities in Maharashtra, including Symbiosis International University, Tata Institute of Social Sciences, and Tilak Maharashtra University.

== Vocational training ==
The state has many post-secondary school industrial training institutes (ITIs) run by the government and private trusts that offer vocational training in numerous trades such as construction, plumbing, welding, automobile mechanic etc. Successful candidates receive the National Trade Certificate. In 2012 approximately 1,50,000 (113644 in ITIs and 35512 in ITCs) students were enrolled in programs run by these organizations.
