= Maharashtra National Law University =

Maharashtra National Law University may refer to one of three universities:

- Maharashtra National Law University, Aurangabad
- Maharashtra National Law University, Mumbai
- Maharashtra National Law University, Nagpur
