= Common Law Admission Test =

University entrance test in India

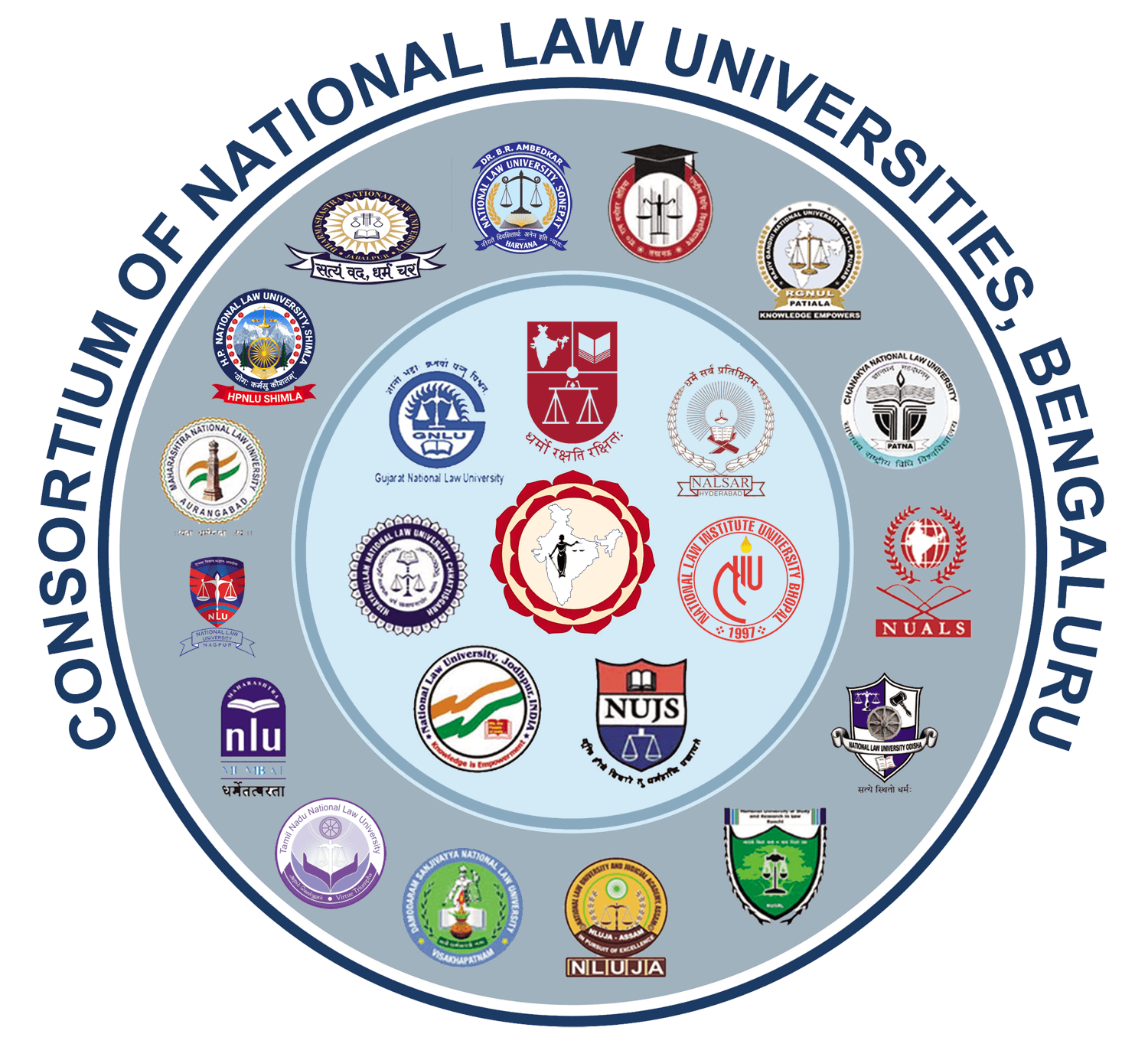
- Consortium of NLUs
- Acronym: CLAT
- Type: Pen-and-paper-based
- Administrator: Consortium of NLUs, Bar Council of India
- Skills tested: Legal Reasoning, Logical reasoning, English language, General knowledge, Current Affairs, Quantitative Techniques (mathematics)
- Purpose: Entrance to the National Law Universities, Self-financed law colleges, PSUs & Indian Army (JAG officers)
- Year started: 2008
- Duration: 2 Hours
- Score range: -30 to 120
- Score validity: 1 year
- Offered: Yearly
- Restrictions on attempts: None
- Regions: India
- Languages: English
- Annual number of test takers: Undergraduate (2025): 72,631; Postgraduate (2025): 15,400 appx
- Prerequisites: Senior Secondary Exam, High School in any stream (for Undergraduate courses); Graduation in law (for Postgraduate courses)
- Fee: 4,000 INR
- Used by: (National Law Universities) & other Private Law Colleges, PSUs, Indian Army.
- Qualification rate: 3% approx
- Website: consortiumofnlus.ac.in

The Common Law Admission Test (CLAT) is a centralized national-level entrance test for admissions to the 26 out of 27 National Law Universities (NLU) except NLU Delhi. CLAT was first introduced in 2008 as a centralized entrance examination for admission to the National Law Schools/Universities in India.

NLU Delhi administers its own entrance exam, the All India Law Entrance Test (AILET). AILET is anticipated to be merged into CLAT in the coming years. Many private and self-financed law schools in India also uses CLAT scores for law admissions. Public sector undertakings in India like ONGC, Coal India, BHEL, the Steel Authority of India, Oil India, the Indian Army (for the recruitment of Judge Advocate General officers) also uses CLAT PG scores. As of January 2026, NLU Meghalaya has started using CLAT scores for admissions in their programmes.

The test is taken after the Higher Secondary Examination or the 12th grade for admission to integrated undergraduate degrees in Law (BA/BBA/B.COM/B.SC/BSW LLB) and after graduation in an undergraduate law program for Master of Laws (LL.M) postgraduate programs. It is considered one of the toughest entrance examinations in India with the acceptance rate being as low as 3 percent.

== Background ==
Before the introduction of Common Law Admission Test, the National Law Universities conducted their own separate entrance tests, requiring the candidates to prepare and appear separately for each of these tests. The schedule of the administration of these tests sometimes conflicted with the entrance test of other NLUs or with other entrance tests such as the IIT-JEE and the NEET. This caused students to miss tests and experience much stress.

There are 26 NLUs in India out of which 1 NLU is an off-centre campus of GNLU known as GNLUS, the first NLU in the country is National Law School of India University, Bengaluru, which admitted its first batch of students in 1988. Out of 26 NLUs, only the National Law University, Delhi conducts its own separate entrance test known as All India Law Entrance Test (AILET). With the emergence of other law schools, which also sought to conduct their admission tests at around the same time, students faced a hard time preparing for them. From time to time this issue to conduct a common entrance exam to reduce the burden of the students to give multiple test was raised, but given the autonomous status of each law school, there was no nodal agency to co-ordinate action to this regard.

The matter drew national attention when a Public Interest Litigation was filed by Varun Bhagat against the Union of India and various National Law Universities in the Supreme Court of India in 2006. The Chief Justice of India directed the Union of India to consult with the National Law Universities to formulate a common test. The move was strongly supported by the Bar Council of India.

Given the lack of a central nodal authority to bring forth a consensus on the issue, the Ministry of Human Resources Development, (Government of India) and the University Grants Commission of India organised a meeting of the Vice-Chancellors of seven National Law Universities along with the Chairman of the Bar Council of India. After a few such meetings, a Memorandum of Understanding (MoU) was signed by the Vice-Chancellors of the seven National Law Universities on 23 November 2007 to conduct a common admission test. The Common Law Admission Test was to be conducted each year by each of the law colleges and the responsibility of conducting the exam was to be rotated and given on the basis of seniority in the establishment. Nonetheless, the matter was not resolved completely as there were other national law universities that were not taking part in CLAT. However, finally in 2015, a fresh MoU was signed by the sixteen National Law Universities, except for National Law University, Delhi for the CLAT 2015 being conducted by Dr. Ram Manohar Lohia National Law University, Lucknow whereby all the National Law Universities became part of the centralized admission process without anyone being left out (except NLU Delhi).

The Consortium of National Law Universities was established on 19 August 2017 with the aim of improving the standard of legal education in the country and justice system through legal education with Prof. R. Venkata Rao, erstwhile Vice-Chancellor, NLSIU as President and Prof. Faizan Mustafa, Vice-Chancellor, NALSAR, as Vice-President.

CLAT examination gained further prominence when in 2023, for the first time, Delhi University's Faculty of Law inaugurated its own 5 Year Integrated LLB Programme, where students can now take admission into the programme on the basis of their CLAT scores itself.

== Eligibility ==
Only Indian nationals and NRIs can appear in the test. The foreign nationals desirous of taking admission to any course in any of the participating Law Universities may directly contact the concerned University having seats for foreign nationals. The Consortium of National Law Universities (NLUs) releases the CLAT eligibility criteria mentions details regarding the minimum educational qualification, minimum marks and age limit.

The eligibility requirements are as follows:

=== Under-graduate courses ===
Senior Secondary School/Intermediate (10+2) or its equivalent certificate from a recognized Board with not less than 45% marks in aggregate (40% in case of SC and ST candidates). There is no upper age restriction for the test.

=== Post-graduate courses ===
LL. B/B. L. Degree or an equivalent degree from a recognized University with not less than 50% marks in aggregate (45% in case of SC and ST candidates). The candidates who have passed the qualifying degree examination through supplementary/ compartment and repeat attempts are also eligible for appearing in the test and taking Admission provided that such candidates will have to produce the proof of having passed the qualifying examination with fifty-five/fifty percent marks, as the case may be, on the date of their admission or within the time allowed by the respective universities.

== Exam pattern ==
This law entrance exam is of two hours duration. The CLAT question paper consists of 120 multiple-choice questions. There are five sections in CLAT exam paper which are:

- English including Comprehension
- Current affairs including General Knowledge
- Legal Reasoning
- Logical Reasoning
- Quantitative Techniques (Maths)

All the questions have been paragraph-based from CLAT 2020. One paragraph will be followed by 5-6 questions. The break up of marks is generally as follows :

Subjects	Number of Questions	Marks
English Language	22-26 questions	22 - 26
Current Affairs, including General Knowledge	28-32 questions	28 - 32
Legal Reasoning	28-32 questions	28 - 32
Logical Reasoning	22-26 questions	22 - 26
Quantitative Techniques	10-14 questions	10 - 14
Total	120	120

Marking Scheme: For every correct answer, aspirants are given one mark and for each wrong answer 0.25 marks are deducted from their total score.

== Preparation Techniques ==
The exam preparation strategy is broadly classified into two:

1. Offline learning
2. Online preparation

While offline is the traditional, online became a choice from 2020 onwards. Here is how aspirants are leveraging online platforms:

- Access to free study material: Aspirants have access to free PDFs with insightful question banks for section-wise preparation, previous year question papers with solutions and free mocks. YouTube being a hub of information helps resolve explanation for topics.
- Access to online learning/classrooms: While self study is a good way to learn or prepare, a guidance from experienced teachers adds an extra edge. CLAT Online Coaching offer a platform to not just understand topics but also clear doubts, practice questions and find tricks to solve them faster as time management plays a key role in this exam.
- Mocks and Quizzes: Practice makes a man perfect, hence, online quizzes around different sections or topics and full length mocks makes it easier to navigate the exam.
- News and Current Affairs: Reading a newspaper is a great habit, however, for the final revision, one shall need simpler resources with important and highlighted summaries of important events. Online resources are advantageous here.
- Online material by Consortium: After registration, your dashboard will enable access to preparatory materials.

== List of National Law Universities ==
1. National Law School of India University, Bangalore
2. NALSAR University of Law, Hyderabad
3. The West Bengal National University of Juridical Sciences, Kolkata
4. National Law Institute University, Bhopal
5. National Law University, Jodhpur
6. Gujarat National Law University, Gandhinagar
7. GNLU Silvassa, Silvassa is an off-centre campus of GNLU
8. Hidayatullah National Law University, Raipur
9. Dr. Ram Manohar Lohia National Law University, Lucknow
10. National University of Advanced Legal Studies, Kochi
11. Rajiv Gandhi National University of Law, Patiala
12. Chanakya National Law University, Patna
13. National Law University Odisha, Cuttack
14. Damodaram Sanjivayya National Law University, Vishakhapatnam
15. National University of Study and Research in Law, Ranchi
16. National Law School and Judicial Academy, Guwahati
17. Tamil Nadu National Law University, Trichy
18. Maharashtra National Law University, Mumbai
19. Maharashtra National Law University, Nagpur
20. Maharashtra National Law University, Aurangabad
21. Himachal Pradesh National Law University, Shimla
22. Dharmashastra National Law University, Jabalpur
23. Dr. B. R. Ambedkar National Law University, Sonipat
24. National Law University Tripura, Agartala
25. Dr. Rajendra Prasad National Law University, Prayagraj
26. NLU Meghalaya, Shillong

Note: NLU Delhi has a separate exam known as AILET.

== Method of allocation ==
The CLAT form has a provision for the students to add their preferred list of colleges in order of their consideration through a preference list option. Each student fills the preference list, according to the colleges they desire. On the basis of these preferences and ranks obtained, students are allocated colleges. As the NLUs are established by the respective state governments, therefore most NLUs also have reservations for their domiciled candidates.

== Conducting organisation ==
The first CLAT Core Committee consisting of Vice-Chancellors of the seven participating NLUs at that time decided that the test should be conducted by rotation in the order of their establishment. Accordingly, the first CLAT was conducted in 2008 by the National Law School of India University. Subsequently, CLAT-2009, CLAT-2010, CLAT-2011, CLAT-2012, CLAT-2013, CLAT-2014, CLAT-2015, CLAT-2016, CLAT-2017, CLAT-2018 CLAT-2019 and CLAT-2020 have been conducted by NALSAR University of Law, Hyderabad, National Law Institute University, The West Bengal National University of Juridical Sciences, National Law University, Jodhpur, Hidayatullah National Law University, Gujarat National Law University, Dr. Ram Manohar Lohia National Law University, Rajiv Gandhi National University of Law, Chanakya National Law University, National University of Advanced Legal Studies and National Law University Odisha respectively. However, from 2019, CLAT is conducted by Consortium of NLUs, a body consisting of Vice-chancellors of all the NLU's except NLU DELHI, which was formed in March, 2019.

== Controversies ==
CLAT-2009, which was scheduled to be held on 17 May 2009 was rescheduled to 31 May 2009 due to leak of question papers.

CLAT-2011 candidates were disappointed with the standard of exam, as up to 12 questions in the various sections had underlined answers due to the oversight of the organisers and students also found the paper lengthy in comparison to the time limit provided (i.e. 2 hours).

CLAT-2012 was marred by a number of controversies, which includes allegations of setting questions out of syllabus and out of the pre-declared pattern. The declared rank list also contained an error, due to which the first list was taken down and a fresh list was put up. The declared question-answer keys contained several errors, which resulted in petitions being filed by the aggrieved students in different High Courts.

CLAT-2014 was conducted by GNLU, Gandhinagar and was also heavily criticized for being poorly conducted with results being withdrawn and declared again. Even lawsuits had been filed for re-examination. The uploaded OMRs were then allowed to be physically verified in the GNLU Campus after students demanded the same.

CLAT-2017 the English paper had several errors.

CLAT-2018 students approached the Supreme Court since there were server problems during the examination. However, the Court refused to order a re-examination.

In 2020, NLSIU announced that it would be withdrawing from CLAT, and conducting its own entrance test, the National Law Aptitude Test (NLAT). However, the Supreme Court of India struck down the separate entrance test conducted by NLSIU and ordered it to re-join CLAT.

== See also ==
- List of law schools in India
- Autonomous law schools in India
- Legal education in India
- Law School Admission Test
- National Law Universities
