= Balraj Chouhan =

Vice Chancellor of Dharmashastra National Law University, Jabalpur in India

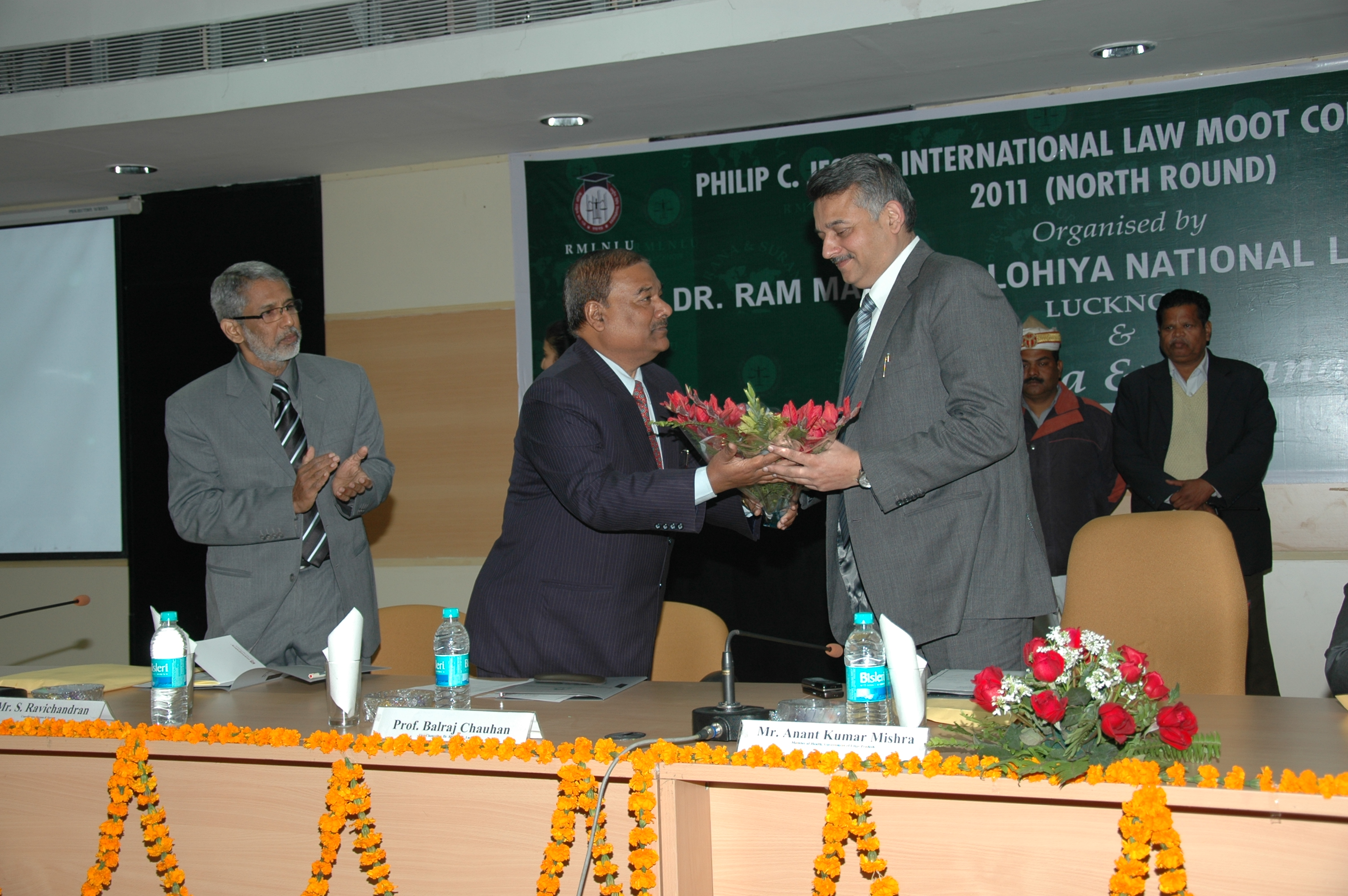
ANANT KUMAR MISHRA, THEN MINISTER OF HEALTH, UP GOVT., PROF. BALRAJ CHAUHAN, THEN VC - DR. RAM MANOHAR LOHIYA NATIONAL LAW UNIVERSITY (RMLNLU), Dr. S RAVICHANDRAN, HEAD - ACADEMIC INITIATIVES, SURANA & SURANA

Balraj Chauhan is the first Vice Chancellor of Dharmashastra National Law University, Jabalpur in India.

Before joining the University, Chauhan served as Director, Amity Law School, Lucknow, Vice Chancellor of Dr Ram Manohar Lohia National Law University, Lucknow and also served as the founding Vice Chancellor of NLIU, Bhopal. He has completed degree in Law from Faculty of Law, University of Lucknow.
