= J.R Midha =

Former Chief Justice of Delhi High Court

J.R. Midha

Chief Justice of Delhi High Court
- In office 11 April 2008 – 7 July 2021

J.R Midha is an Indian jurist who served as a Judge of the Delhi High Court from 11 April 2008 to 7 July 2021. After his retirement, he became a Professor of Practice at the National Law University, Delhi (NLU Delhi).

== Career ==
J.R. Midha served as a Judge of the Delhi High Court for over a decade, handling several notable cases, including life and death sentence references. He was known for his expertise in civil, criminal, and constitutional law. His judgments have had a lasting impact on the interpretation of various legal provisions. He and Pawan Reley has edited the Ninth Edition of B.V. Vishwanatha Aiyar’s Commentary on the Code of Civil Procedure, 1908. As co-editors.

=== Justice of Delhi High Court ===
J.R. Midha was appointed as Chief Justice of the Delhi High Court on 11 April 2008, a position he held until his retirement on 7 July 2021. During his tenure, he presided over several important cases, contributing to the development of legal standards and practices in India. He played a pivotal role in ensuring justice in many complex cases.

=== Post-retirement ===
After retiring from the judiciary, J.R. Midha joined the National Law University, Delhi as a Professor of Practice. In this role, he mentors students and contributes to the academic and professional development of future legal professionals. His transition from judge to educator reflects his dedication to the legal community.

== Notable cases ==
He presided over several landmark cases, particularly in civil and criminal law. His judgments have contributed significantly to the evolving legal landscape of India, with several being cited in subsequent rulings and legal debates.

== Chairperson roles ==
J.R. Midha has held numerous chairperson roles during his career, guiding various judicial and administrative committees.

== Quotes ==
In Court of Justice, both the parties know the truth, it is the Judge, who is on trial.

== See also ==
- Delhi High Court
- National Law University, Delhi
