= Himachal Pradesh National Law University =

Indian public law school

Himachal Pradesh National Law University, Shimla
- Motto in English: Yoga is Skill in Action
- Type: National Law University
- Established: 2016; 10 years ago
- Affiliations: UGC, BCI
- Chancellor: Chief Justice of Himachal Pradesh High Court
- Vice-Chancellor: Priti Saxena
- Visitor: M. M. Sundresh
- Undergraduates: 800 approx
- Postgraduates: 128
- Doctoral students: 20
- Location: Shimla, Himachal Pradesh; 31.161°N 77.046°E
- Campus: Ghandal, Sixteen Miles
- Nicknames: HPNLU, Shimla
- Website: hpnlu.ac.in

Himachal Pradesh National Law University Shimla (HPNLU Shimla) is a premier Indian public law school and a National Law University located in Shimla, Himachal Pradesh, India. It is the 20th National Law University established in India. It ranks 34th in the NIRF Law Rankings 2025. NLU Shimla is governed by the High Court of Himachal Pradesh.

== History ==
The Himachal Pradesh National Law University(HPNLU) Shimla, was established by the State Government in the year 2016, by an Act of the Legislature (Act 16 of 2016). The university started functioning from 5 October 2016.

== Academics ==
HPNLU offers undergraduate, postgraduate, and doctoral programs in law. Admission to the undergraduate and postgraduate programs is through the Common Law Admission Test (CLAT).

== See also ==
- National Law University, Delhi
- National Law Universities
