= National Law University, Odisha =

Law school in Odisha, India

National Law University Odisha
- Motto in English: Law locates in the truth
- Type: National Law University (NLU)
- Established: 2 November 2009; 16 years ago
- Affiliations: UGC, BCI
- Chancellor: Chief Justice of Orissa High Court
- Vice-Chancellor: Prof. (Dr.) K. Vidyullatha Reddy
- Faculty: 43
- Students: 909
- Undergraduates: 829
- Postgraduates: 38
- Doctoral students: 42
- Location: Cuttack, Odisha, India; 20°29′07″N 85°47′30″E
- Campus: Urban (50 acres)
- Website: www.nluo.ac.in

National Law University Odisha (NLUO) is a public law school and a National law University in India located at Cuttack, Odisha. It was established in 2008 under the National Law University Odisha Act (Act 4 of 2008), commencing its first batch from July 2009. The NLUO offers undergraduate (integrated B.A./LL.B., BBA/LL.B.), and post-graduate courses (L.L.M, M.Phil., PhD) in law. It is one of the 25 NLUs in the country.

Faizan Mustafa was the founding Vice-Chancellor of the university, who later served as the Vice-Chancellor of NLU Hyderabad (NALSAR). Currently, Prof. (Dr.) K. Vidyullatha Reddy is the Vice-Chancellor of the university.

NLUO is the fastest growing National Law University (NLU) in all aspects including academics, moot performances, placements etc. NLUO recently inaugurated the Largest Law Library in Asia in 2023.

== Campus ==
NLUO was established under the National Law University Odisha NLUO Act of 2008. Since June 2012, NLUO has been functioning from its current beautiful campus amid rivers Mahanadi and Kathajodi at Naraj. The university is spread over a 50-acre (200,000 m^{2}) campus sanctioned by the Odisha government with another 20 acres set to be allotted. The college is located at CDA Sector 13 in the Millennium city of Cuttack.

There are two boys' hostels and two girls' hostels with 60+ rooms on each floor. The amphitheater of NLUO can house the entire college at once and is functional during special fests and programs. The Academic Block houses different lecture halls, seminar hall, committee halls and the library. The library is divided into three sections: the E-Brary, which has computers for research and work; the Journal section; and the main library. A new library was constructed & inaugurated in 2023 after which now NLUO houses & operates Asia's largest law library.

The campus is located near greenery and rivers. NLUO has an entrance gate and student infrastructure.

== Academics ==
=== Admissions ===
For both the undergraduate and post-graduate programs, students are accepted through the Common Law Admission Test (CLAT). Just like any other NLU, admissions to NLU Odisha is known to be highly competitive, as students must appear for CLAT, which is among the Top 10 hardest entrance exams of India.

==== Undergraduate ====
The total intake of undergraduate students aiming to pursue either of the courses is 180. The lot is divided into 120 seats for B.A./LL.B and 60 seats for BBA/LL.B. Of the 120 B.A/L.L.B. seats, 14 are reserved for scheduled tribes, 10 for scheduled castes, 4 for the disabled, 4 for foreign nationals and 10 for NRI. The university also provides state domicile reservations for 40 seats i.e. 25% as approved by the state government. B-VOC (Bachelor of Vocation Degree) in Access To Justice is a UGC sponsored course, with a total intake of 50 seats and reservation as per Govt of India is applicable. The University Grant Commission approved the commencement of a B-Voc Degree course from 2018 to 2019.

==== Postgraduate ====
NLUO offers a 1 year long L.L.M course in Corporate & Commercial Law and Constitutional Law and has an intake of 50 students divided 25 each for the streams. Out of the 25 in each stream 03 are reserved for SC, 2 for ST, 1 for specially abled persons, 2 for NRI and 1 for foreign nationals respectively.

=== Rankings ===
University rankings

Law – India
- NIRF (2024): 9
- India Today (2024): 7

National Law University Odisha was ranked 7th in 2024 by India Today. It ranked 9th in India in the National Institutional Ranking Framework (NIRF) law ranking in 2024.

== Student life ==
=== Social Media Committee ===
The Social Media Committee looks over and manages all the official social media handles of the university. NLUO has its official pages on many popular social media sites such as Instagram, Facebook etc. NLUO also has its official YouTube channel with thousands of subscribers.

=== Fests, Cultural & Other Activities ===
NLUO conducts many activities, such as festivals. Like many other colleges and universities every year NLUO also conducts its own flagship cultural fest named as KAIRAAN.

=== International Maritime Arbitration Moot ===
Since 2014, NLUO has been conducting the NLUO International Maritime Arbitration Moot Court Competition (IMAM), a flagship event of The Moot Society (TMS) of NLUO. It is India's first International Maritime Law Moot with a special focus on International Commercial Arbitration.

The 5th edition of IMAM was organised by The Moot Court Society [TMS] in association with Eastern Book Company/ SCC Online Web Edition in March–April 2018. 24 teams from across the took part in this competition.

Dr. Ram Manohar Lohiya National Law University, Lucknow won the 10th National Law University Odisha Bose & Mitra & Co. International Maritime Arbitration Moot 2023 and ILS Law College Pune bagging the citations for the Runner’s up, Best Written Submissions and Best Oralist (Nachiket Kulkarni).

=== Mooting achievements ===
NLUO has been ranked 10 in the Mooting Premier League 7th edition which is decided on the basis of cumulative points earned in multiple moot court competitions. NLUO has recorded stellar performance in the Philip C. Jessup International Law Moot Court Competition, which is the oldest and the largest moot court competition in the world. For two consecutive years, 2016 and 2017, and also in 2019; NLUO has qualified for the international rounds of the moot court competition. While in 2016 it finished in the top 16, in 2017 NLUO was the semi-finalist in the world rounds and the winner of the National rounds. In 2019 it finished as runners-up in the Indian national rounds and was among the top 32 teams globally. It was also given various other awards.

NLUO also was declared the quarter-finalist of Willem C. Vis International Commercial Arbitration Moot, Vienna, 2021. The university was also given memorial awards.

The university has also performed well in the Price Media Law Moot Court Competition hosted by the University of Oxford. NLUO was the Runner-Up of South Asia Rounds and an Octo-Finalist in the International Rounds of the Competition in 2018 and 2019.

NLUO in 2017 was the winner of the 34th BCI Moot Court Competition among its other achievements. It also received the honorable mention for Runner Up in the category of Best Newcomer Team in the 18th International Maritime Law Arbitration Moot (2017) hosted by Murdoch University, Australia. In 2019, NLUO won the 11th Edition of the Prestigious NUJS Herbert Smith Freehills (HSF) National Moot Court competition.
