= National Law University, Tripura =

Law university in Tripura, India

- Type: National Law University
- Established: 2022; 4 years ago
- Affiliations: UGC, BCI
- Chancellor: Chief Justice of Tripura High Court
- Vice-Chancellor: Dr. Yogesh Pratap Singh
- Academic staff: 38
- Location: Agartala, Tripura, 799015, India; 23.9054°N 91.2492°E
- Language: English
- Website: nlutripura.ac.in

National Law University, Tripura (NLUT) is a statutory and premier law university located in Agartala, Tripura, India. It was established under the National Law University, Tripura Act, 2022, enacted by the Government of Tripura. It is one of the 28 NLUs in the country. The university offers undergraduate (integrated B.A., LL.B. (Hons.), and postgraduate courses (LL.M., PhD) in law. The chief justice of the High Court of Tripura serves as the chancellor of the university. Prof. (Dr.) Yogesh Pratap Singh was appointed as the founding vice-chancellor.

== History ==
NLUT was established in 2022 through legislation passed by the Government of Tripura. The foundation stone of the university was laid by the president of India, Droupadi Murmu, on 12 October 2022. The first batch of students was admitted in 2023.

== Campus ==
The university currently operates from the Tripura Judicial Academy campus in Narsingarh, Agartala. The Government of Tripura has allocated approximately 9.23 acres of land in Narsingarh for the construction of a permanent campus. The planned campus infrastructure includes academic and administrative buildings, a library, moot court hall, hostels, faculty housing, and sports and recreational facilities. Construction of the permanent campus commenced on 6 February 2025, following a Bhoomi Pujan ceremony conducted in the presence of state government and judicial officials. Completion of the campus is expected by 2027.

== Administration ==
The university administration functions through statutory bodies, including the Governing Council, Executive Council, Academic Council, and Finance Committee.

- Chancellor: Chief Justice of the High Court of Tripura (currently Justice M. S. Ramachandra Rao)
- Founding vice-chancellor: Prof. (Dr.) Yogesh Pratap Singh
- Registrar (In-charge): Dr. Nachiketa Mittal

== Academics ==
=== Undergraduate programme ===
The university offers a five-year integrated B.A.LL.B. (Hons.) programme with an annual intake of approximately sixty students. The programme follows a semester-based credit system that combines legal theory with practical components such as moot courts, internships, clinical legal education, seminars, and workshops.

=== Postgraduate programme ===
NLUT offers a one-year LL.M. programme with specialization in Constitutional Law. The programme includes coursework, seminars, and a dissertation component to develop advanced legal research and analytical skills.

=== Doctoral programme ===
The university offers a Doctor of Philosophy (Ph.D.) programme in law and related interdisciplinary areas. The programme includes coursework, methodological training, and supervised research in accordance with regulatory norms.

== Collaborations and outreach ==
NLUT collaborates with the government and international organizations in areas of policy and capacity building. The university has provided technical and academic assistance for Gram Panchayat Development Plans in partnership with the Rural Development Department, Government of Tripura. The university has also signed a memorandum of understanding with UNICEF Assam for projects related to child rights and protection.

== See also ==
- National Law School of India University
- National Law Universities
- National Academy of Legal Studies and Research
