= Sanjeevi Shanthakumar =

Indian academic, administrator and activist

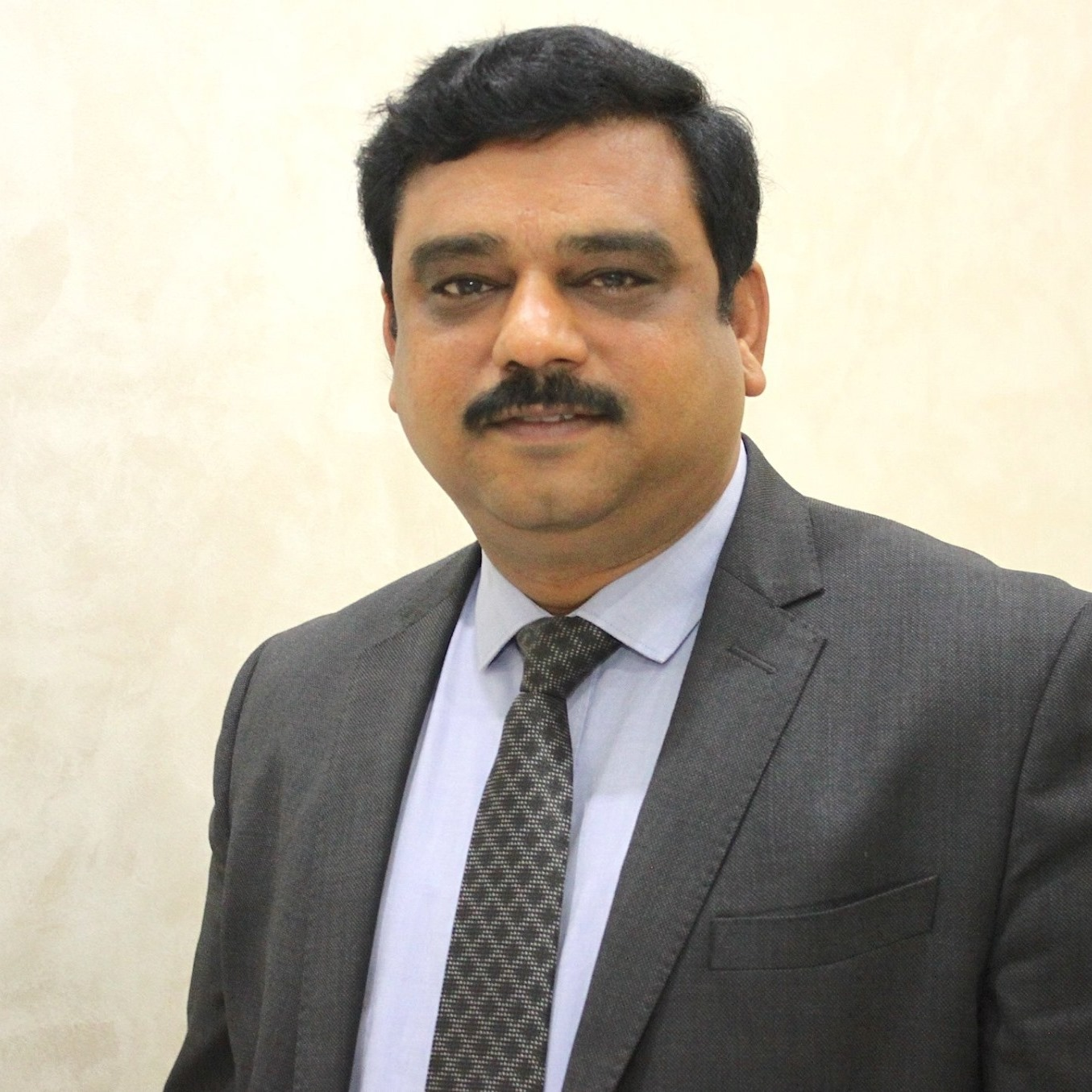
- Shanthakumar in 2023
- Born: 13 July 1969 (age 57); Tamilnadu
- Education: University of Madras
- Occupation: Academic
- Office: Director Gujarat National Law University
- Predecessor: Bimal N. Patel

Sanjeevi Shanthakumar (born 13 July 1969) is the current director of Gujarat National Law University, Gandhinagar. He was appointed by a committee headed by Justice Dr. D. Y. Chandrachud. He is also the Provost of Gujarat Maritime University, Gandhinagar.

== Early life and education ==
Shantakumar was born on 13 July 1969 in Tamilnadu, India. Shanthakumar is an alumnus of Madras University, having received his bachelor's degree, master's and doctoral law degree. Before joining the legal academia, he had practiced at the Madras High Court for seven years.

== Career ==
He has served as the pro vice chancellor and dean, School of Law at G.D. Goenka University, Gurgaon; founder dean, Faculty of Law at SGT University, Gurgaon; founder director of ITM Law School, ITM University, Gurgaon; founder director of MATS Law School, MATS University, Raipur; controller of examinations and associate professor of law at Hidayatullah National Law University, Raipur; senior lecturer at Government Law College, Madurai and Government Law College, Chennai. Before joining the legal academia he had practiced at the Madras High Court for seven years as an advocate. He had his training on teaching law at the National Law School of India University, Bangalore under a World Bank funded project and at the Cardiff Law School, Cardiff, Wales, UK under a British Council funded project. He has been involved in training the Law Teachers on Law Teaching and Legal Research at various universities in India as part of a British Council funded project. He had visited premier universities across the globe, including Oxford, to understand the best practices in legal education. He has been a very active member of the International Association of Law Schools, USA. He was awarded the Environmental Law Champions Development Award by the Asian Development Bank.

== Works ==
Shanthakumar had executed the Environmental Law Capacity Building Project funded by the World Bank; the Law Teaching and Legal Research Skills Project of the British Council and Cardiff University, UK, and a research project on audio piracy funded by the Ministry of Human Resource Development, Government of India. Currently, he is the chair of the Environmental Law Study Group of the International Association of Law Schools and a member of the Teaching and Capacity Building Committee of the IUCN Academy of Environmental Law.

== Specializtion ==
His areas of specialization are environmental law, human rights law, international law and constitutional law. He has authored three books on environmental law published by Lexis Nexis, Tamil Nadu Dr. Ambedkar Law University and National Law School of India University, Bangalore and two books on Human Rights Law. His book on human rights law, published by Peoples Watch, is being used as a handbook for training the human rights defenders by many civil society organizations in India and is translated into many Indian languages. He has published several research articles on contemporary legal issues in various national and international journals and edited volumes. He has presented papers and delivered keynote addresses in many national and international conferences in India and abroad.

== Awards ==
- Member, Governing Board, International Union for Conservation of Nature (IUCN) Academy of Environmental Law
- Best Social Scientist Award, Indian Society of Criminology
- Member, Teaching and Capacity Building Committee, IUCN Academy of Environmental Law
- ADB Environmental Law Champions Development Award, Asian Development Bank
- Visiting professor, Islamic University, Jakarta, Indonesia
- Visiting professor, Esa Unggul University, Jakarta, Indonesia
- Visiting professor, University of National Development – "Veteran", Jakarta, Indonesia
