= Rajiv Gandhi Education City =

- Education City
- Location in Haryana, India Rajiv Gandhi Education City (India) Rajiv Gandhi Education City (Asia)
- Coordinates: 28.9416°N 77.1313°E
- Country: India
- State: Haryana
- District: Sonipat district

Government
  - Type: Municipal Corporation
  - Body: Sonipat Municipal Corporation
- Elevation: 224.15 m (735.4 ft)

Languages
  - Official: English, Punjabi
  - Regional: Haryanvi
- Time zone: UTC+5:30 (IST)
- Vehicle registration: HR
- Lok Sabha constituency: Sonipat
- Vidhan Sabha constituency: Rai Assembly Constituency
- Website: www.sonipat.nic.in

Rajiv Gandhi Education City is a planned education city in Sonipat in the Indian state of Haryana. The city comes under the National Capital Region, Delhi and also under the Municipal Corporation and Urban Agglomeration of Sonipat City. As of 2025, it host 4 universities and extension campuse of IIT Delhi. The park is planned to cover 2,026 acres and foundation stones were laid in June 2012.

== Institutes ==
University	Type	Established	Specialisation
Ashoka University	Private	2014	General
Indian Institute of Technology Delhi, Sonipat campus	INI's Extension campus	2013	Technical
Dr. B.R. Ambedkar National Law University	State	2013	Law
SRM University, Haryana	Private	2013	General
World University of Design	Private	2017	Design

== Technopark ==
On 4 April 2018, the newly built Technopark costing INR175 crore was unveiled by the Chief Minister of Haryana at the Rajiv Gandhi Education City, Sonipat. It is aimed at boosting the technical skills, dissemination and expansion of technical skills in the state.

== See also ==
- List of institutions of higher education in Haryana
