= Srikrishna Deva Rao =

Indian law professor

Professor (Dr.) Srikrishna Deva Rao is the Vice Chancellor of NALSAR University of Law, Hyderabad and a teacher and scholar in criminal law and access to justice.

== Selected publications ==
- Srikrishna Deva Rao (2013). Paralegal Education in India: Problems and Prospects, Journal of National Law University, Delhi 1: 94–105
- Srikrishna Deva Rao (2013). Mapping of media law curriculum related to legal education in India

== Initiatives ==
At National Law University Odisha Rao has taken several initiatives to strengthen the teaching–learning process and research.

- The NAAC Self Study Report of NLUO mentions some of his initiatives at NLUO
- The University has set up Community College in 2016 under the UGC Scheme to prepare "barefoot lawyers" to strengthen the justice delivery system in India.
- The Project on Access to Justice is another initiative of the University supported by Department of Justice, Ministry of Law & Justice, Government of India and UNDP. Under this Project, the University has set up three village Legal Aid Clinics in Dompada village in Cuttack, Jankia in Khurda and Brahmagiri in Puri district. These Village Legal Aid Clinics are intended to improve access to justice in marginalised communities.
- NLUO will have faculty exchange and joint research with globally reputed institutions.
- An MOU with National Institute of Securities Markets (NISM) has been signed in November 2016. The MOU is designed to foster academics and research between the two institutes, thereby promoting capacity building in securities markets both in training and employment.
- Another MoU has been signed between Competition Commission of India (CCI) and NLUO
- NLUO has recently been accredited by NAAC at A Grade
