= Maharashtra National Law University, Nagpur =

Public law school in Maharashtra, India

- Motto: शुभाम् विद्याम् श्रद्धानः आददीता
- Type: National Law University
- Established: 2016 (10 years ago)
- Affiliations: UGC, BCI, IALS
- Endowment: Ministry of Law and Justice, Government of India
- Chancellor: Justice Atul S. Chandurkar
- Vice-Chancellor: Prof. (Dr.) Jyoti Bhakare
- Location: Nagpur, Maharashtra, 441108, India; 20.9451106°N 79.0268499°E
- Campus: 60 acres
- Nicknames: NLUN, MNLU N
- Website: nlunagpur.ac.in

Maharashtra National Law University, Nagpur (MNLU) (also known as National Law University, Nagpur or NLU Nagpur) is a National Law University and a public law school established by the government through the Maharashtra National Law University Act (Maharashtra Act No. VI of 2014). The university is the 2nd National Law University established in Maharashtra and is located in the Orange City of Nagpur, Maharashtra. Justice Atul Chandurkar, Judge at the Supreme Court of India, serves as the chancellor of the institution.

== History ==
The demand for the establishment of a National Law University was the oldest among all national level institutions like IIM, IIIT, AIIMS, and NIPER in Vidarbha which is considered as a backward region of Maharashtra. Nagpur was the first to be tipped to get the State's First National Law University when its demand was endorsed by dignitaries which included Then-President Pratibha Patil, Chief Justice Mohit Shah and then Chief Minister Prithviraj Chavan during High Court Bar Association's (HCBA) Platinum Jubilee celebrations in February 2011. But due to some unidentified reasons, the proposal failed to move further. Ex-High Court Bar Association President Mr. Anil Mardikar first raised the demand on 6 February 2011 for an NLU in Nagpur. But The Maharashtra Government shifted The institute to Mumbai as revealed by then Minister of State DP Sawant. The High Court Bar Association of Nagpur and District Bar Association of Nagpur staged protests and even filed a PIL in Nagpur High Court against this move. The Government was forced to allow the establishment of an NLU in Nagpur. The Bill to govern NLUs was tabled in the Nagpur session of the assembly in 2013 for the first time. The State Assembly passed the Maharashtra National Law University Act (Maharashtra Act No. VI of 2014) paving way for the establishment of The Institution. The Chief Justice of India appointed Justice Sharad Bobde as the first Chancellor for MNLU Nagpur and District judge Dr. N. M. Sakharkar was appointed as the Officer on Special Duty (OSD) and the Registrar of the university.

== Academics and Research ==
The university has various centres for advanced legal studies and research to address the socio-legal issues and challenges and to conduct research on thriving issues of law, social science and humanities. These centres offer courses, conduct seminars, conferences, and training programs for the identified target groups.

The prominent research centres are

1. Centre for International Relations and Governance
2. Centre for Law, Technology and Policy
3. Centre for Criminology, Criminal Justice and Forensic Science
4. Centre for Sports Law
5. Centre for Gender Justice Studies
6. Centre for Child Rights
7. Centre of Intellectual Property Law (IPR) [In collaboration with the World Intellectual Property Organisation(WIPO)]
8. Centre for Law, Language and Culture
9. Centre for Corporate Social Responsibility and Sustainability
10. Centre for Air and Space Law
11. Centre for Environmental Law
12. Centre for Tribal and Land Rights
13. Centre for Tax Law and Practice
14. Centre for Corporate Law and Governance
15. Centre for Shastric Studies and Research in Law
16. Centre for Alternative Dispute Resolution

The university has inked Memoranda of Understanding (MoU) with prominent law universities of the country for the purpose of academic collaboration that will encompass exchange of students and members of faculty between the two universities, etc. The university has inked MoUs and collaborations with the following institutions.

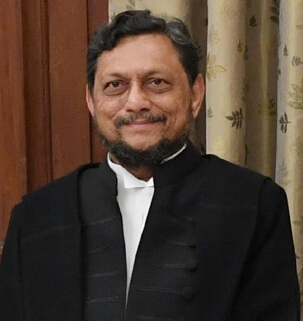
Justice Sharad Arvind Bobde, 47th Chief Justice of India, is the founder chancellor of the university.

1. National Law School of India University, Bangalore;
2. National Law University, Delhi;
3. Rajiv Gandhi National University of Law, Punjab;
4. The Tata Institute of Social Sciences, Mumbai, Mumbai;
5. Gujarat National Law University, Gandhinagar;
6. National Law University and Judicial Academy, Assam;
7. Maharashtra National Law University, Aurangabad.

== Library ==
The university's library has physical copies of over 35,000 legal titles. It has received various donations prominently from Bombay High Court Library (Nagpur Bench) for its development. The university also has access to various physical and virtual legal databases.

== Publications ==
1. MNLU Contemporary Law Review (CLR)
2. MNLU Student Law Review
3. MNLU Journal of Social Sciences
4. MNLU Journal on International Law
5. MNLU Journal on Taxation Laws
6. MNLU Journal on Arbitration
7. MNLU Journal of Law and Economics

== Admissions ==
The university offers B.A. LL.B. (Hons.) Five-Year Integrated Degree Programme [120 seats], B.A. LL.B. (Hons.) in Adjudication and Justicing Five-Year Integrated Degree Programme [60 seats], B.B.A. LL.B (Hons.) Five-Year Integrated Degree Programme [60 seats], One-Year LL.M. Postgraduate Degree Programme, Doctor of Law (Ph.D.) Programme, Short-Term Diplomas and Certificate Courses in law.

The admissions to the university are done on merit ranking based on the Common Law Admission Test (CLAT) of India which is a centralized test for admission to 24 National Law Universities in India. The eligibility is as per the CLAT Notification.

The acceptance rate is less than five percent with more than sixty thousand applicants applying for 180 seats [120 seats for B.A. LL.B.(Hons.) and 60 seats for B.B.A. LL.B.(Hons.)]. A separate admission process including group discussion and personal interview is carried out for selecting students for B.A. LL.B. (Hons.) in Adjudication and Justicing Programme which is a Five-Year Integrated Degree Course.

== Affiliations ==
MNLU Nagpur is recognized by the Bar Council of India and the University Grants Commission (UGC) as a state university. The Bombay High Court (Nagpur Bench) serves as the governing institution of the university.

== Memberships ==
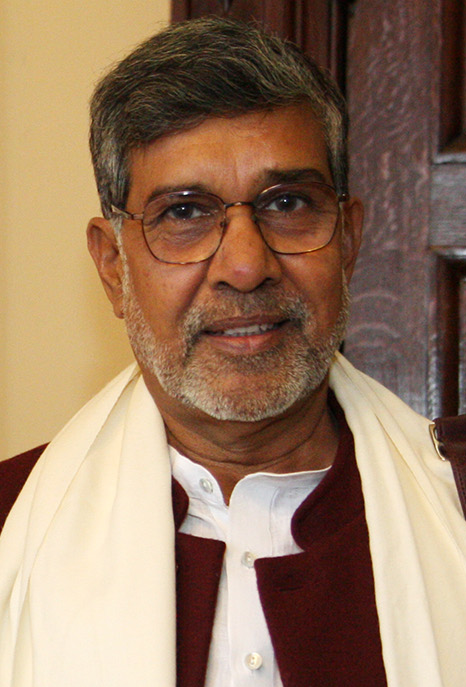
Mr. Kailash Satyarthi, Nobel Peace Prize Recipient, 2014, serves as a member of the academic council of the university.

MNLU is a member and has a technical association with

1. Asian Law Institute (ASLI), Singapore
2. Commonwealth Legal Education Association (CLEA)
3. Forum of South Asian Clinical Law Teachers (FSACLT), Goa
4. Indian Economic Association (IEA);
5. Indian Institute of Comparative Law (IICL), Jaipur
6. Indian Institute of Public Administration (IIPA), New Delhi
7. Indian Law Institute (ILI), New Delhi
8. Indian Political Science Association (IPSA)
9. Indian Society of Criminology (ISC), Madras;
10. Indian Society of International Law (ISIL), New Delhi
11. Institute of Constitutional and Parliamentary Studies (ICPS), New Delhi
12. International Association of Law Schools (IALS)
13. International Law Students Association (ILSA), USA
14. Legal Information Institute of India (LII of India)
15. Shastri Indo-Canadian Institute (SICI)
16. National Academy of Direct Taxes, Nagpur
17. The Institute of Military Law, Nagpur

== Student Life ==
=== Lawkriti ===
"Lawkriti" is the flagship annual cultural fest of the university. Spanning an entire week, the fest transforms the campus into a hub of cultural expression, with a wide range of activities taking place each day. Students participate in events such as quizzes, debates, music and dance performances, poetry recitations, dramatic productions, and various other recreational and cultural programs. Other than providing a platform for artistic and intellectual expression, it also fosters key social skills. The fest culminates in a grand closing ceremony, helping enrich the campus experience of all who attend.

Sanskrotsav

Sanskrotsav is a celebration of tradition, creativity, and youthful energy. This two-day cultural fest brings students together to enjoy a variety of cultural activities, performances, and entertainment programs. It provides a platform to showcase talent, explore diverse forms of art and culture, and create lasting memories.

=== Sportacus ===
Sportacus is the annual sports fest of the university where students and professors get a chance to compete and showcase their sporting ability in a spectrum of sports.

== Campus ==
The university's main campus is under construction and is coming up at a cost of 750 crores sanctioned by the Government of Maharashtra. The Ground-breaking ceremony for the campus was performed by Ranjan Gogoi, former Chief Justice of India; Nitin Gadkari, Union Minister: Devendra Fadnavis, Chief Minister of Maharashtra; Justice Sharad Bobde, former Chief Justice of India; Justice B. R. Gavai, former Chief Justice of India; Justice N. V. Ramana, former Chief Justice of India; Justice Pradeep Nandrajog, former Chief Justice of Bombay High Court and Pro-Chancellor of the university, Vinod Tawde, former Minister of Higher and Technical Education of Maharashtra; Sudhir Mungantiwar, former Minister of Finance and Chandrashekhar Bawankule, Minister of Revenue of Maharashtra

The new building would be a completely green one with state-of-art facilities for students and staff with GRIHA Certification. It would have a 'Museum of Law' along with a health and wellness centre to help nearby villagers. The campus will follow Indian Green Building Council (IGBC) norms. It will have solar panels to produce energy, and food would be cooked on it. All classrooms will be embedded with information and communication technology. The first phase of the construction has been done. Construction of the second and third phase of the campus is expected to complete to soon. MNLU Nagpur is envisioned to have the most beautiful campus in the country. MNLU Nagpur is expected to have the best in class infrastructure along with various amenities and facilities which include the country's first museum of law and a Hostel for the LGBTQ+ community.
