= National Law Universities =

National Law Universities in India

Locations of National Law Universities

National Law Universities (NLU) are public law schools in India, founded pursuant to the second-generation reforms for legal education sought to be implemented by the Bar Council of India. The first NLU was the National Law School of India University aka NLS/NLU Bangalore which admitted its first batch in 1988. Since then, most of the states in India have NLUs. Currently there are 27 NLUs across the country out of which one is an off-centre campus of Gujarat National Law University, Gandhinagar, GNLU Silvassa Campus.

The admissions to these universities is conducted through the Common Law Admission Test (CLAT) except in the case of National Law University, Delhi, which admits students through its own entrance examination named as All India Law Entrance Test (AILET). NLU Meghalaya also has its own admission / entrance test named Meghalaya Undergraduate Admission Test (UAT), Postgraduate Admission Test (PAT) and PhD Entrance Test (PET). CLAT which is also known as the main gateway to NLUs has been ranked as one of the top five toughest entrance examinations in India. India International University of Legal Education and Research (IIULER) Goa is the latest entry to Consortium in November 2024 but it is a Private University under Section 2(f) of UGC Act, 1956. Thus, IIULER is not a National Law University (NLU) like other universities in CLAT Consortium since it is not a Public Government Funded University. It is owned and managed by Bar Council of India Trust - PEARL FIRST (BCIT-PF) which is an independent body that is not a part of Bar Council of India (BCI).

NLUs have Chief Justice of India (CJI) and various Chief Justices of Respective High Courts as their Chancellors and visiting professors. Many retired judges and bureaucrats are also here as permanent faculty and Vice-Chancellors.

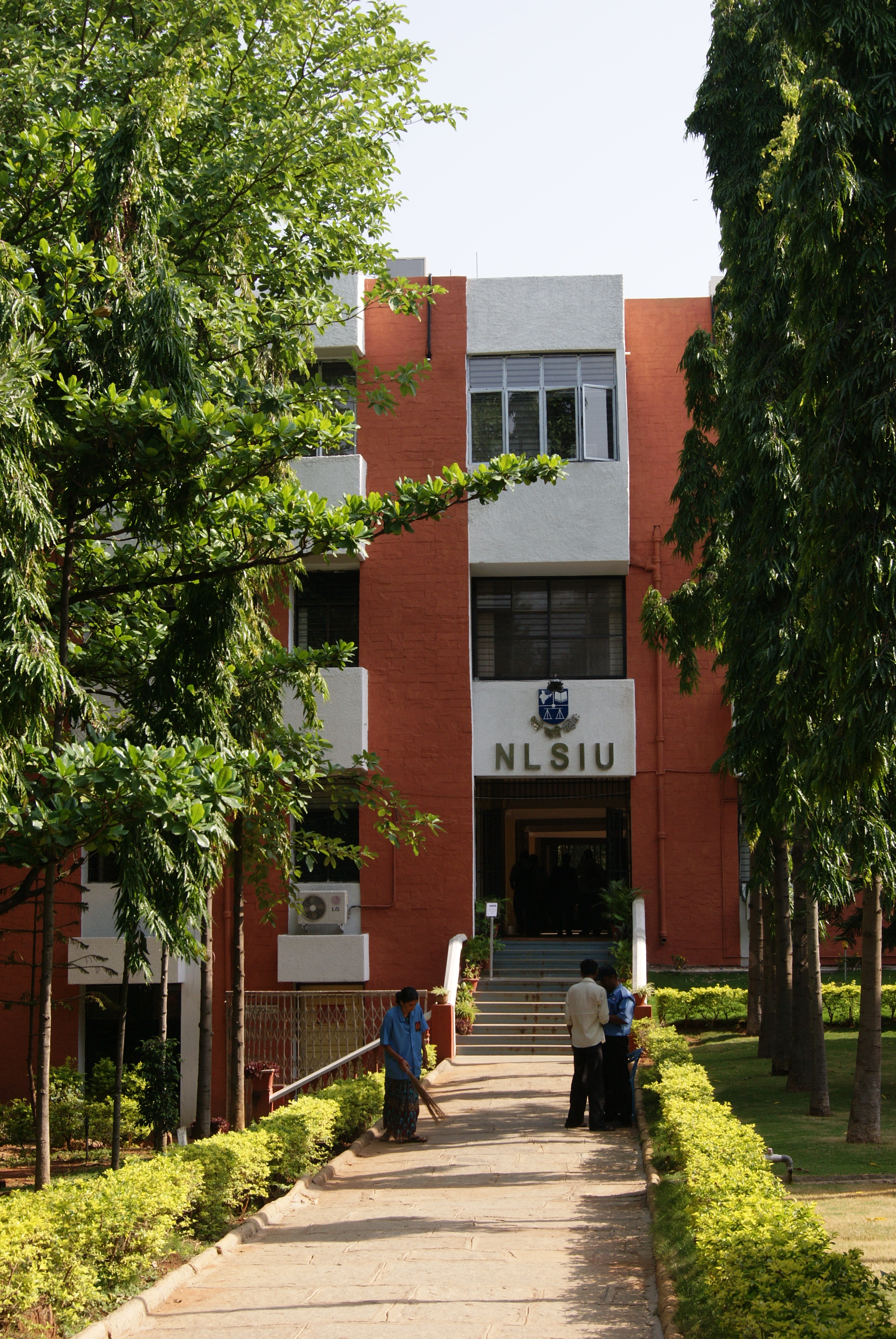
National Law School of India University, Bengaluru, India

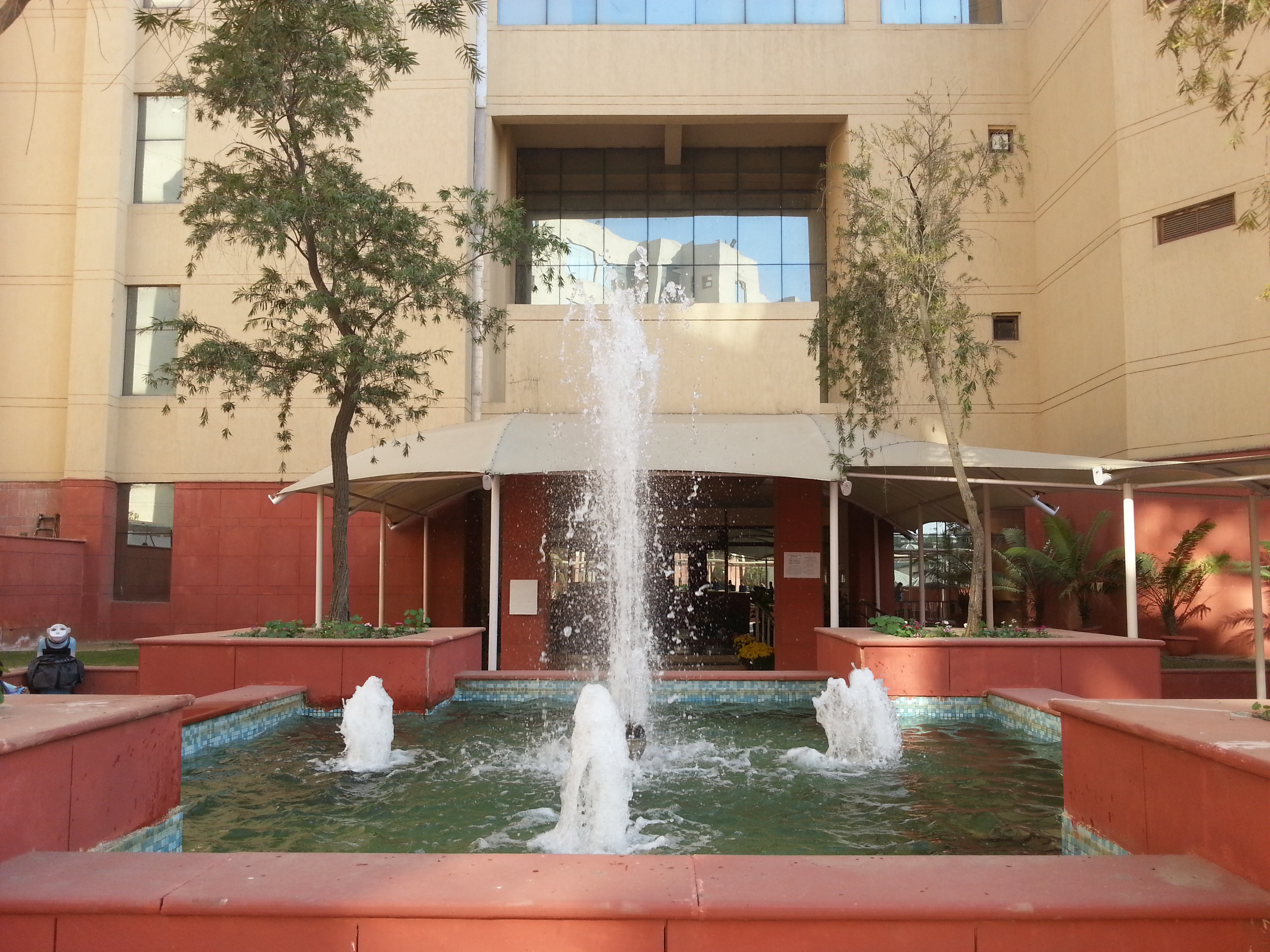
National Law University, Delhi

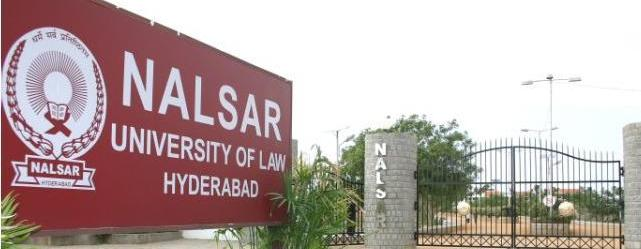
NALSAR, Hyderabad

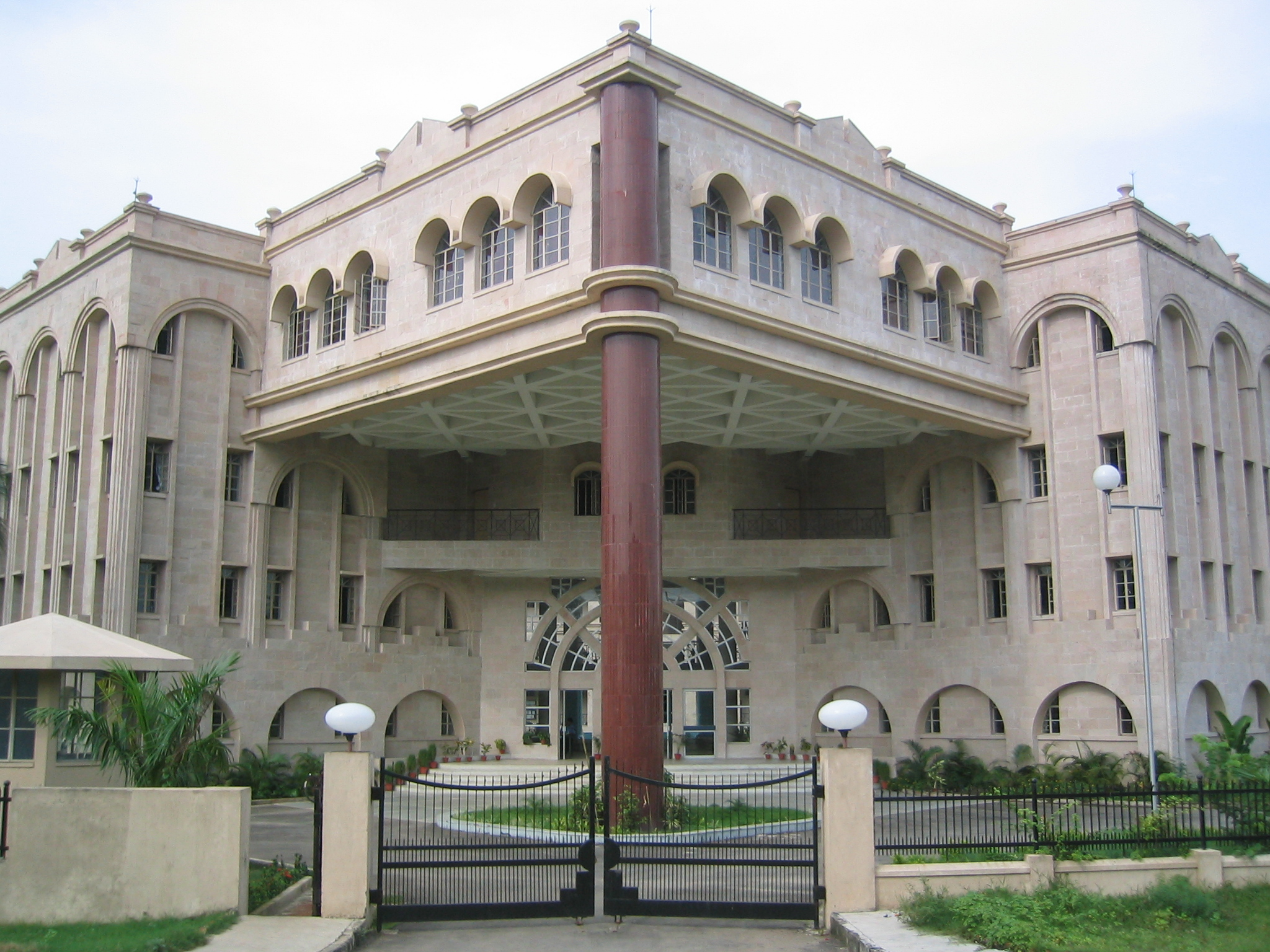
The West Bengal National University of Juridical Sciences, Kolkata

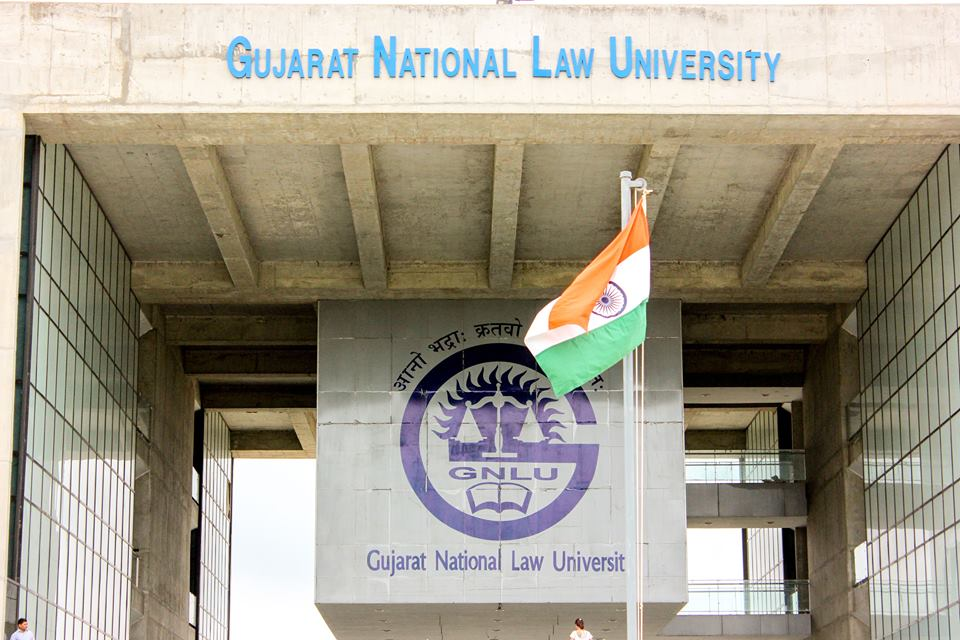
Gujarat National Law University, Gandhinagar

== History ==
Traditionally legal education in India was conducted through the medium of non-specialized universities of India which granted law degrees like any other graduate degree. These universities referred and taught the curriculum prescribed by the Bar Council of India, but since they were under the overall control and supervision of the University Grants Commission, it was not possible for the Bar Council to effectively pursue reforms in legal education.

This system continued for more than two decades with the overall legal education supervision by the Bar Council, since its establishment in terms of the Advocates Act, 1961. However, there were calls for reforms from all quarters of the country in general because of the falling standards of the bar and there were mounting pressures over the Bar Council of India to change the way legal education was imparted in India.

The first concrete decision to this end was taken in 1984 when various proposals to modernize legal education were considered and approved by the Legal Education Committee of the Bar Council, in an attempt to improve legal education throughout India. One major proposal was the decision to establish specialized institutions to impart legal education in an integrated and diversified manner. The aim was to revitalize the legal profession by making law an attractive profession and making it competitive to attract talent, which was hitherto diverted to other professional areas such as medicine and engineering.

== Structure ==
In contrast with the existing pattern of legal education in India, the proposed autonomous law schools varied in structural design and in various other respects. Some of these can be identified through the characteristics they carry:

- Autonomous status of the law schools: This implied that the law schools carried either a 'deemed university' or a 'university' status, which empowered them to grant their own degree and which was recognized by other institutions in terms of the University Grants Commission regulations.
- Five year law programme: Earlier law degrees were granted only to those candidates who had already completed their graduation and after three years of formal legal education. However, the admission to these autonomous law schools were only to those candidates who had completed Grade 12.
- Integrated degrees: In these autonomous law schools, students studied for a law degree in integration with another degree of their choice. This allowed prospective advocates to have understanding of areas other than law. It also compensated for the lack of three years of formal education of other subjects that candidates in traditional three year law degree programme carried. Initially the choice of second degree was confined to B.A . (Bachelor of Arts). Later, other choices were also offered like B.Sc. (Bachelor of Science), B.B.A. (Bachelor of Business Administration) and B.Com. (Bachelor of Commerce).
- Intensive legal education: These law schools were given autonomy to devise the imparting of the curriculum in a manner which would best suit the candidate's ability to understand legal concepts and ability to appreciate various issues involved in legal setting and instill in them the merit and reasoning standards required for a high professional conducts. A standout feature of these institutions is that they are single subject universities where the main thrust of education is on law with other complementary social sciences.
- National status of law schools: These Schools are recognized by the university grants commission as "state universities" and are affiliated to the Bar Council of India. Each of these law schools were to be established under a specific legislation, to be passed by the State legislature of the State desirous of establishing a law school. In terms of these legislation, these law schools were required to establish and practice excellent and high standards, at par with other national level institutions imparting education in other wakes of social life. The conferment of national status also make admittance to these law schools at a prestigious choice and thus inviting meritorious students to get inclined to join legal profession.
- Involvement of legal luminaries: To improve standards of legal education and ensure education imparted in these institutions met desired standards, the Bar Council of India involved various prestigious and talented individuals with these law schools. The most notable of these was the involvement of highly placed constitutional functionaries, such as the Chief Justice of India or the Chief Justice of various High Courts as the "Visitors" and often "Chancellors" of these law schools, which implied a constant involvement and supervision of elite figures of legal profession in India with these law schools.

== List of National Law Universities (NLUs) ==
No.	NIRF ranking	Institute	Abbreviation	Established	City	State/UT
1	1	National Law School of India University	NLSIU	1986	Bengaluru	Karnataka
2	27	National Law Institute University	NLIU	1997	Bhopal	Madhya Pradesh
3	3	National Academy of Legal Studies and Research	NALSAR	1998	Hyderabad	Telangana
4	--	National Law University Jodhpur	NLUJ	1999	Jodhpur	Rajasthan
5	5	West Bengal National University of Juridical Sciences	WBNUJS	1999	Kolkata	West Bengal
6	7	Gujarat National Law University	GNLU	2003	Gandhinagar	Gujarat
7	--	Hidayatullah National Law University	HNLU	2003	Naya Raipur	Chhattisgarh
8	23	Dr. Ram Manohar Lohiya National Law University	RMLNLU	2005	Lucknow	Uttar Pradesh
9	38	National University of Advanced Legal Studies	NUALS	2005	Kochi	Kerala
10	20	Rajiv Gandhi National University of Law	RGNUL	2006	Patiala	Punjab
11	31	Chanakya National Law University	CNLU	2006	Patna	Bihar
12	2	National Law University Delhi	NLUD	2008	Dwarka	Delhi
13	39	Damodaram Sanjivayya National Law University	DSNLU	2008	Visakhapatnam	Andhra Pradesh
14	30	National Law University Odisha	NLUO	2009	Cuttack	Odisha
15	24	National University of Study and Research in Law	NUSRL	2010	Ranchi	Jharkhand
16	35	National Law University and Judicial Academy	NLUJA	2009 (Note: Academic sessions began only in 2011.)	Guwahati	Assam
17	--	Tamil Nadu National Law University	TNNLU	2012	Tiruchirapalli	Tamil Nadu
18	--	Maharashtra National Law University Mumbai	MNLUM	2014	Mumbai	Maharashtra
19	28	Maharashtra National Law University Nagpur	MNLUN	2016	Nagpur	Maharashtra
20	34	Himachal Pradesh National Law University	HPNLU	2016	Shimla	Himachal Pradesh
21	--	Maharashtra National Law University, Chhatrapati Sambhajinagar	MNLUA	2017	Chhatrapati Sambhajinagar	Maharashtra
22	--	Dharmashastra National Law University	DNLU	2018	Jabalpur	Madhya Pradesh
23	--	Dr. B.R. Ambedkar National Law University	DBRANLU	2012 (Note: Academic sessions began only in 2019.)	Sonipat	Haryana
24	--	National Law University Tripura	NLUT	2022	Agartala	Tripura
25	--	Gujarat National Law University, Silvassa Campus	GNLUS	2023	Silvassa	Dadra and Nagar Haveli, and Daman and Diu
26	--	National Law University Meghalaya	NLU MEG	2023	Shillong	Meghalaya
27	-	Dr. Rajendra Prasad National Law University	RPNLU	2024	Prayagraj	Uttar Pradesh
28	--	National Law University Sikkim	NLU SIKKIM	2018	Gangtok	Sikkim

== See also ==
- Legal education in India
- List of law schools in India
