= National Law University, Delhi =

National Law University in Delhi, India

- Other names: NLUD, NLU Delhi, Delhi NLU
- Motto: nyāyastatra pramāṇaṃ syāt
- Motto in English: There shall justice prevail
- Type: National Law University
- Established: 2008; 18 years ago
- Accreditation: NAAC
- Academic affiliations: UGC; AIU; BCI
- Budget: ₹50.27 crore (US$5.4 million) (FY2023–24 est.)
- Chancellor: Chief Justice of Delhi High Court
- Vice-Chancellor: G. S. Bajpai
- Visitor: Justice B. V. Nagarathna
- Faculty: 174 (2025)
- Students: 724 (2025)
- Undergraduates: 580 (2025)
- Postgraduates: 81 (2025)
- Doctoral students: 63 (2025)
- Location: Sector 14, Dwarka, Delhi, 110078, India; 28.5995235°N 77.0219135°E
- Campus: 21 acres (8.5 ha); Urban
- Colours: Red and White
- Website: nludelhi.ac.in

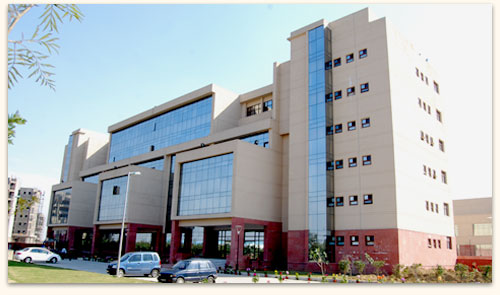
National Law University, Delhi from front

National Law University, Delhi (NLUD) is a law school in India, situated in Sector-14, Dwarka, Delhi. It offers courses at both undergraduate and postgraduate levels. As one of the national law schools in India, NLU Delhi (NLUD) is built on the five-year law degree model which is proposed and implemented by the Bar Council of India. The National Law University, Delhi, Act, 2007, provides for the Chief Justice of India or Senior Supreme Court Judge of his/her choice to be the university's visitor, the Chief Justice of the High Court of Delhi to function as the university's chancellor, and its vice-chancellor to function as the chief administrator.

== History ==
National Law University, Delhi was established in 2008 by Act No. 1 of 2008 of NCT Delhi in the National Capital Territory of Delhi with the initiative of the High Court of Delhi under the leadership of Ranbir Singh, the founder-director and vice-chancellor of the NALSAR University of Law, Hyderabad, who became the university's founding vice-chancellor. It was inaugurated by the then President of India, Pratibha Patil. The college started functioning in 2008 in temporary buildings. By the year 2010, the college had completed its construction and was fully functional.

Vice-Chancellors
S.No	Name	Tenure
1	Prof. (Dr.) Ranbir Singh	21/07/2008 to 23/09/2020
2	Prof. Srikrishna Deva Rao	24/09/2020 to 31/10/2022
3	Prof. (Dr.) G.S. Bajpai	28/02/2023 to Present

Registrars
S.No	Name	Tenure
1	Prof. (Dr.) Ghanshyam Singh	21/06/2008 To 01/04/2010
2	Prof. Srikrishna Deva Rao	01/08/2010 To 26/08/2014
3	Prof. (Dr.) G.S. Bajpai	27/08/2014 To 11/01/2021
4	Prof. (Dr.) Anupama Goel	11/01/2021 To 28/01/2022
5	Prof. (Dr.) Harpreet Kaur	28/01/2022 To 18/09/2023
6	Prof. (Dr.) Ruhi Paul	18/09/2023 To 10/04/2026
7	Prof. (Dr.) Risham Garg	10/04/2026 to Present

== Academics ==
=== Academic Programmes ===
==== Undergraduate ====
NLUD offers a five-year undergraduate, B.A., LL.B. (Hons.) program. One hundred and ten seats are offered and ten additional seats are allocated to foreign nationals, OCIs and PIOs. The undergraduate program is based on a credit system with additional seminar courses for further learning, pursuant to the interests of the students. The program consists of approximately fifty-two subjects to be studied over ten semesters, with five subjects in each semester. Students are expected to submit fifty research projects before their graduation. The curriculum remains intensive and has led to concerns about stress levels among the students.

==== Postgraduate ====
NLUD offers several postgraduate programmes, including a one-year Master of Laws (LL.M.), with admission through the All India Law Entrance Test (AILET). The University also offers a one-year LL.M. in Digital Technology, Policy & Governance in collaboration with Netaji Subhas University of Technology (NSUT). The interdisciplinary programme combines legal education, public policy and technical training, focusing on cybersecurity, digital governance and emerging technologies.

The University introduced a Joint Master’s/LL.M. in Intellectual Property Law and Management in the academic year 2024-25, in collaboration with the World Intellectual Property Organization (WIPO) and the Office of the Controller General of Patents, Designs and Trade Marks (CGPDTM), under the Ministry of Commerce and Industry, Government of India. Established under the WIPO India Action Plan, 2023, the programme offers specialised education in intellectual property law and management, with degrees awarded by NLUD.

NLUD also offers a two-year Post Graduate Insolvency Programme (PGIP), which combines academic instruction with practical training in insolvency and restructuring. Successful candidates receive a PGIP certification authorised by the Insolvency and Bankruptcy Board of India (IBBI), alongside a separate M.A./LL.M. degree in Insolvency awarded by NLUD, subject to the fulfilment of academic requirements.

In addition to these degree programmes, the University offers postgraduate diploma programmes in various areas of law, including Urban Environmental Management, Judging and Court Management, and Intellectual Property Rights and Patent Law. It also offers a Doctor of Philosophy (Ph.D.) programme for advanced legal research.

=== Admissions ===
NLUD does not utilise the Common Law Admission Test like other National Law Universities do; admissions to the undergraduate (UG) B.A., LL.B. (Hons.) program and postgraduate programmes are done through the All India Law Entrance Test (AILET), a test conducted every year by the university.

AILET (UG) Pattern

The AILET for B.A.LL.B (Hons.) programme has three (3) sections of 150 multiple choice questions for 150 marks in total. The duration of the examination is 120 minutes. The three sections are: Section A: English Language (50 questions; 50 marks). Section B: Current Affairs & General Knowledge (30 questions; 30 marks). Section C: Logical Reasoning (70 questions; 70 marks). Legal principles may be used in the logical reasoning section to test logical aptitude, but the examination will not require any kind of legal knowledge or technical understanding. Negative marking: There will be negative marking in AILET 2022-3. The criteria for negative marking will be based on the formula 0.25*4=1, which means per wrong answer, 0.25 marks will be deducted. Therefore, four wrong answers will lead to a deduction of 1 Mmark. If two or more candidates get the same marks at the All India Law Entrance Test (AILET), their merit will be determined on the basis of higher marks in the section on LOGICAL REASONING in the AILET 2022. If the merit is still the same, then the candidate of the senior age shall get preference. If there is still no change in merit, then the computerised draw of lots shall be taken into consideration.

=== Rankings ===
University rankings

Law – India
- NIRF (2024): 2

National Law University, Delhi has been ranked 2nd at the All India level in the Law School category by the National Institutional Ranking Framework for 7 Consecutive year since 2017.

The National Law University Delhi (NLU Delhi) has made its debut in the QS World University Rankings by Subject 2026 for Law and Legal Studies, securing a position in the 201–250 global band, with an overall subject rank of 223.

=== Justice T. P. S. Chawla Library ===
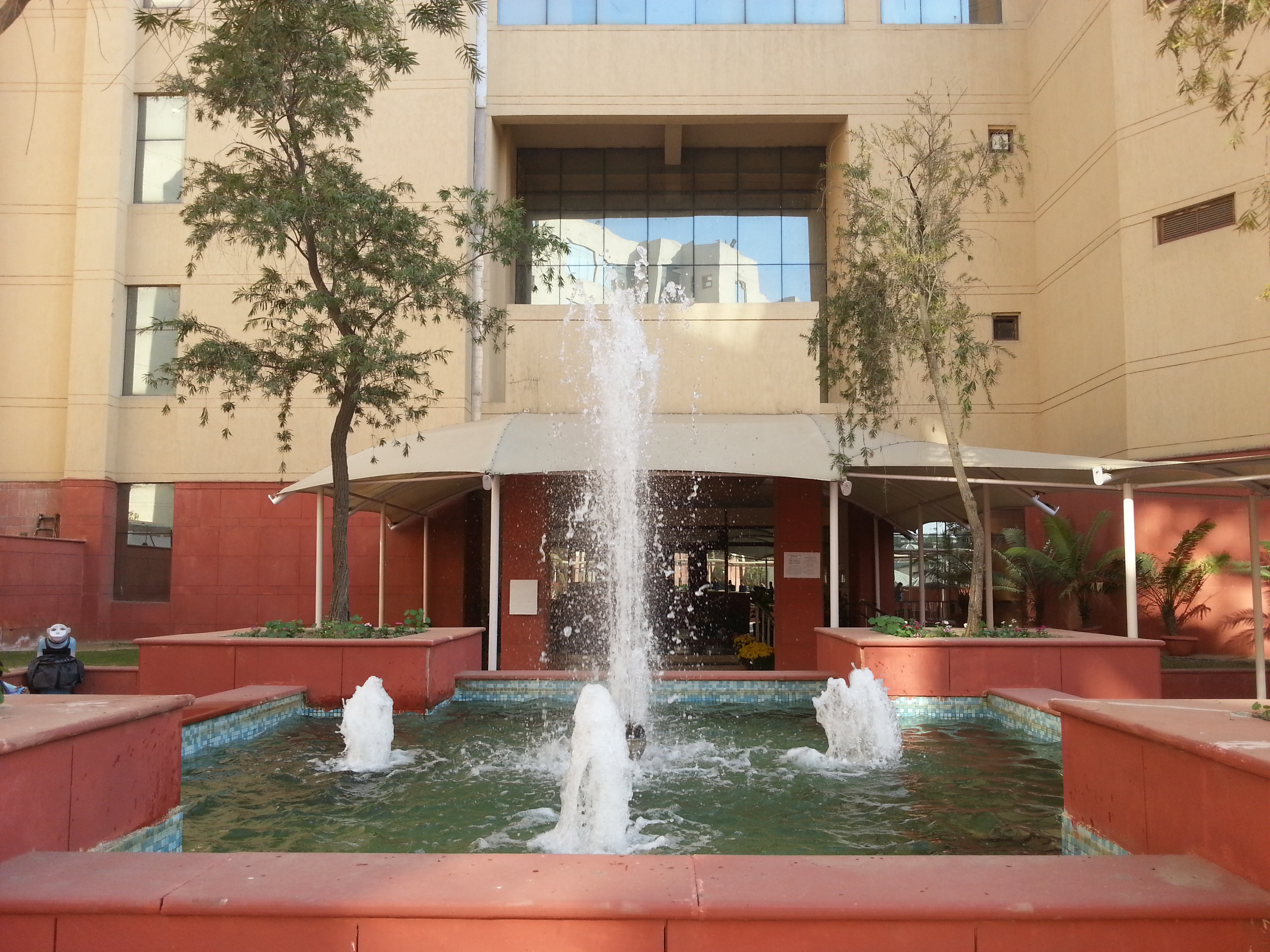
Justice T.P.S. Chawla Library

The library is named after T.P.S. Chawla, a former judge of the High Court of Delhi who contributed significantly to the development of the library by donating his personal collection of rare volumes to it. The library is fully automated, and book circulation is maintained through electronic Library-cum-Identity Cards with the help of a barcode system. The collection comprises over 41,000 documents, including monographs, commentaries, textbooks, reference books and loose leaf material on various subjects, such as Jurisprudence, Judicial Process, Constitutional law, Intellectual Property, Public International Law, Environmental Law, Alternative Dispute Resolution, Aviation Law, Human Rights, Criminal Law, Cyber Laws, International Business Transactions, and Maritime Law.

The library consists of two storeys.

== Research ==
NLUD currently has thirteen research centres:

- Centre for Corporate Laws, Governance and Financial Laws (CCLGFL)
- Centre for Child Rights & Juvenile Justice
- Centre for Communication Governance
- Centre for Comparative Law
- Centre for Corporate Law And Governance
- Centre for Constitutional Law, Policy and Governance
- Centre for Criminology and Victimology
- Centre for Comparative Studies in Personal Laws

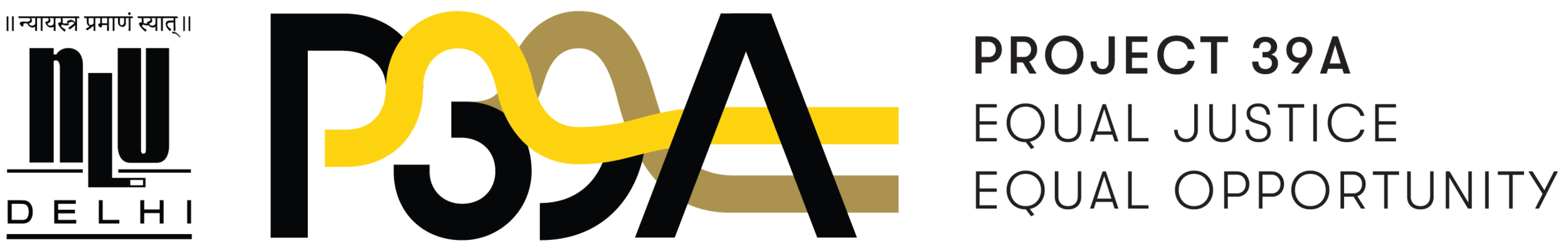
Project 39

- Project 39A: Project 39A is inspired by Article 39-A of the Indian Constitution, which champions equal justice and opportunity by breaking down socioeconomic barriers. With a focus on empirical research, Project 39A aims to reevaluate criminal justice practices, sparking dialogues on issues like legal aid, torture, forensics, mental health in prisons, and the death penalty. The team commits to conducting rigorous research before proposing reforms, despite challenges like poor record-keeping and data access. They emphasise the importance of communicating their findings to a broader audience beyond legal professionals, as the health of the criminal justice system concerns society as a whole.
- Centre for Tax Laws
- Centre for Law & Urban Development
- Centre for Environmental Law, Policy and Research (CELPR)
- Centre for Innovation, Intellectual Property and Competition (CIIPC)
- Centre for Social Inclusion And Minority Rights
- Centre for Transparency and Accountability in Governance
- Centre for Transnational Commercial Law (CTCL)
- Public International Law Centre (PILC)

NLUD also possesses endowed chairs:

- K.L. Arora Chair in Criminal Law
- Justice B.R. Sawhny Chair in Professional Ethics
- S.K. Malik Chair on Access to Justice
- DPIIT IPR Chair
- Chair on Investment Treaties and International Commercial Arbitration
- Chair on Consumer Law
- UNESCO Chair for Legal Dimensions of Clean Sports
- Chair on Justice for Children in collaboration with UNICEF
- Chair in Insolvency and Restructuring Studies

They also feature a scholarly journal in collaboration with Sage Publications known as the Journal of Victimology and Victim Justice'.

Student run initiatives like:

- The Constitutional Law Club, NLU Delhi
- Fairsquare, Competition Law Society
- Society for Energy, Projects and Infrastructure Laws (SEPIL)

== Notable people ==
=== Alumni ===
- Dushyant Chautala, former Deputy Chief Minister of Haryana

=== Faculty ===
- Upendra Baxi

== Publications ==
Journals run by students and faculty at National Law University Delhi (NLU Delhi) are an integral part of the institution's academic landscape. These publications serve as platforms for legal scholarship, research, and discourse, facilitating the exchange of ideas and promoting academic excellence within the legal community. These are the journals published by the school:

- NLUD Journal of Legal Studies
- Journal of National Law University, Delhi
- International Journal of Transparency and Accountability in Governance
- Journal on Labour
- Indian Journal of Criminology
- Journal of Corporate and Financial Laws

== See also ==
- National Law School of India University
- National Academy of Legal Studies and Research
- Gujarat National Law University
