= Maharashtra National Law University, Aurangabad =

Law school in Maharashtra, India

Maharashtra National Law University, Chhatrapati Sambhajinagar
- Former names: Maharashtra National Law University, Aurangabad
- Type: National Law University
- Established: 2017 (9 years ago)
- Affiliations: UGC, BCI
- Chancellor: Justice Prasanna B. Varale
- Vice-Chancellor: Dr. Bindu S. Ronald
- Location: Chhatrapati Sambhaji Nagar, Maharashtra, India
- Website: www.mnlua.ac.in

Maharashtra National Law University, Chhatrapati Sambhajinagar (MNLU-CS)(Formerly MNLU Aurangabad, MNLUA) is a National Law University in Chhatrapati Sambhajinagar, Maharashtra, India. It was established in 2017 by the Government of Maharashtra, the third and final university to be installed through the Maharashtra National Law University Act, 2014 following Maharashtra National Law University, Mumbai and Maharashtra National Law University, Nagpur, the 21st National Law University in India. The Chancellor of the university is Prasanna B. Varale, judge of Supreme Court of India and the Vice-Chancellor is Dr. Bindu S. Ronald.

== Academics ==
MNLU Chhatrapati Sambhajinagar offers 60 seats for Bachelor of Laws (Hons.) degree. It offers one year L.L.M. in constitutional and corporate law. Admission is through Common Law Admission Test (CLAT).

== Campus ==
Land for the 55 acres (0.22 km^{2}) permanent campus for the university was identified at Karodi in the outskirts of Chhatrapati Sambhajinagar. The university currently operates from a temporary setup at the Government College of Education, Aurangabad. Hostel facilities are provided at Kanchanwadi, a locality of Chhatrapati Sambhajinagar.
