= Dr. B. R. Ambedkar National Law University =

University in Sonipat, Haryana, India

- Motto: Nīyate vivakṣitārthaḥ anena iti nyāyaḥ
- Motto in English: That by which the intended meaning is conveyed is Nyāya — the principle of justice
- Type: National Law University
- Established: 26 April 2012; 14 years ago
- Accreditation: UGC, BCI
- Academic affiliations: Consortium of National Law Universities
- Chancellor: Governor of Haryana
- Vice-Chancellor: Dr. Devinder Singh
- Visitor: Chief Justice of India
- Location: Plot No.5, Rajiv Gandhi Education City, Sonepat, Haryana, 131029, India; 28°56′49″N 77°06′26″E
- Campus: 25 acres (10 ha); Suburban
- Language: English, Hindi
- Website: www.dbranlu.ac.in

Dr. B. R. Ambedkar National Law University (DBRANLU) is a National Law University located at Rajiv Gandhi Education City, Sonipat, Haryana, India. It was established by the State Government of Haryana in the year 2012 by the State Legislature Act No. 15 of 2012."National Law University, Haryana Act No. 15 of 2012" (PDF). The University celebrates its Foundation Day on 26th April. It is recognized by the Bar Council of India and is a member of the Consortium of National Law Universities. By an Amendment"The National Law University Haryana (Amendment) Bill, 2014" (PDF). in 2014, the name of the University was changed from 'The National Law University Haryana' to 'Dr. B.R. Ambedkar National Law University Sonepat', in the honor of B. R. Ambedkar, social reformer and the architect of the Constitution of India. The University covers an area of 25 acres. The Chief Justice of India or his nominee, who shall be a sitting Judge of the Supreme Court of India, is the Visitor of the University. Hon'ble Ashim Kumar Ghosh, the Governor of Haryana, is the incumbent Chancellor. Devinder Singh is the incumbent Vice-Chancellor of the University.

Vice-Chancellor	From	To
Kailash Chandra Sharma (Addl.)	18.01.2018	10.03.2019
Viney Kapoor Mehra	10.03.2019	10.03.2022
Archana Mishra	10.03.2022	09.03.2025
Ashok Kumar, IPS (Retd.) (Addl.)	13.03.2025	24.05 2025
Devinder Singh	24.05.2025	Till date

DBRANLU started its first batch for B.A. LL.B. (Hons.) Five Year Integrated Course from the academic year 2019–20.

== Academics ==
=== Courses offered ===
DBRANLU currently offers the following courses:

- B.A. LL.B. (Hons.): Five-year Integrated Undergraduate Course
- B.B.A. LL.B. (Hons.)
- LL.M Master of Laws: Postgraduate Course (One-year)
- LL.M Master of Laws: Flagship Postgraduate Course (Two-year)
- PhD in Law: Doctorate Program

== Research ==
There are multidisciplinary Research Centres at DBRANLU which address pressing social issues, conduct conferences, enhance research output, and foster collaborations, contributing to impactful publications, projects, and policy development.

1. Centre For Public Policy and Good Governance
2. Centre For Competition and Consumer Law and Policy
3. Centre for Research in Commercial and Corporate Laws
4. Centre for Conflict Management and Dispute Resolution
5. Centre for Labour Studies
6. Centre for Gender Justice & Human Rights
7. Incubation Centre for Legal & Inter- Disciplinary Entrepreneurship
8. Centre for Disaster Management & Laws
9. Intellectual Property Rights Facilitation & Research Centre
10. Centre for Constitutional Law and Transformative Studies
11. Centre for Criminal Law Research & Advocacy Skills
12. Centre for Law & Technology
13. Centre for Performing Arts & Creative Legal Studies
14. Centre for Research in Artificial Intelligence & Forensic Science
15. Centre for Law & Economics
16. Centre for Clinical Legal Education and Community Justice
