= Gujarat National Law University =

Public law school in Gujarat, India

- Motto: Aa No Bhadraha, Kratavo Yantu Vishwatah
- Motto in English: Let the noble thoughts come from all directions
- Type: National Law University
- Established: 2003; 23 years ago
- Founder: Kirtibhai N. Raval
- Affiliations: UGC, BCI
- Director: Dr. Sanjeevi Shanthakumar
- Visitor: Justice Nilay Vipinchandra Anjaria
- Location: Gandhinagar, Gujarat, India; 23°09′10″N 72°39′39″E
- Campus: Residential
- Website: www.gnlu.ac.in

The Gujarat National Law University (GNLU) is an eminent public law school and a National Law University established under the Gujarat National Law University Act, 2003 in the state of Gujarat. The university is located at Gandhinagar, which is the capital of Gujarat and is located 23 kilometers north of the city of Ahmedabad. The statute provides for the Chief Justice of India or a Senior Supreme Court Judge to serve as the Visitor of the university. The university is known for its highly competitive admissions and has an acceptance rate of 0.045 %. It has an intake of around 174 students selected from a pool of around 100,000 applicants in its undergraduate law programme.

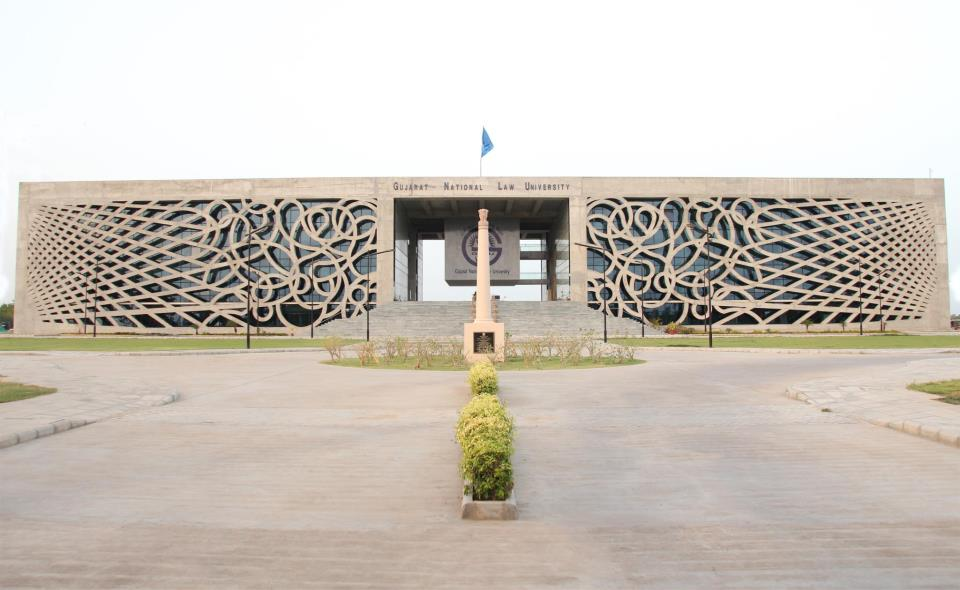
Gujarat National Law University is the seventh National Law University to be set up in the country

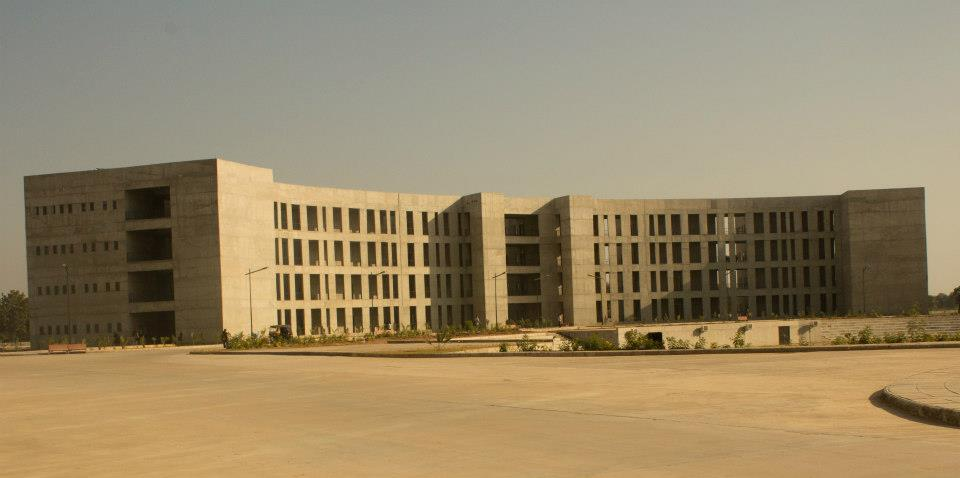
Academic Block "Shishya Bhavan"

== History ==
GNLU was formed in the year 2003, by the efforts of the Solicitor General of India, Kirit Raval, the Chief Minister of Gujarat, Narendra Modi and the Bar Council of India. The University is based on the structure of the National Law School of India University (NLSIU), Bangalore. GNLU was the sixth National Law University (NLU) to be set up in the country. It was established with the active support of the Government of India, the Government of Gujarat and the judicial fraternity. Prof. (Dr.) V.S. Mani was the first Director, followed by Prof. (Dr.) Bimal N. Patel. In 2012, GNLU got its new 50-acre campus situated in the Knowledge Corridor of Gandhinagar.

== Academics ==
=== Curriculum ===
The curriculum of GNLU is based on a two-semester per year system and is decided by the professors concerned. The courses include project work, report writing, research and analysis. As GNLU is a Research-based Training University (RbTU), each faculty prepares the course outline, devises the syllabus based on their first in-house research and consultation with subject experts across the country and the world. Mooting is compulsory in the first semester and all first-year students taking admission in any undergraduate course have a choice to learn any one language (Arabic, Chinese, French, Russian, Spanish, German, Japanese, Swahili, and Sanskrit).

=== Admissions ===
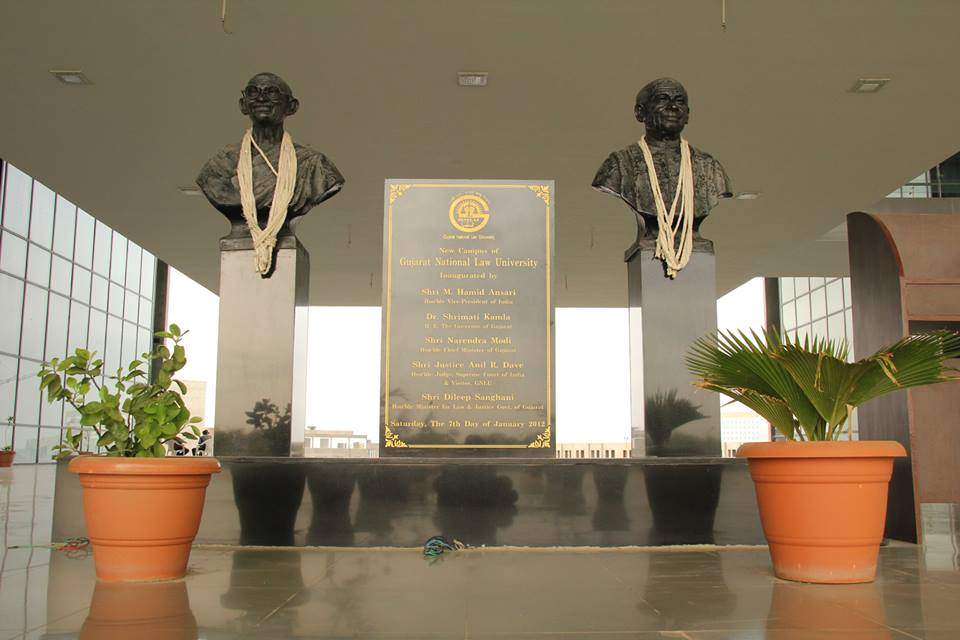
The Foundation Stone

Admissions to GNLU were originally done on the basis of a separate entrance exam conducted by the university itself, but after a Supreme Court ruling directing all law entrance examinations to be clubbed together, the Common Law Admission Test (CLAT) was introduced in 2008, and since then admissions in GNLU, for both the undergraduate and postgraduate programs are made on the basis of performance in CLAT. The first CLAT was conducted in 2008, by NLSIU, and in 2014, GNLU conducted CLAT. In 2019, around 60,000 students appeared for CLAT.

=== Rankings ===
University and college rankings

Law – India
- NIRF (2024): 8
- India Today (2022): 4

Gujarat National Law University was ranked fourth by India Today's "India's Best Colleges 2023: Law". The National Institutional Ranking Framework (NIRF) ranked the institute 8th in its law ranking 2024.

=== Journals published ===
A full list of journals published by GNLU is here under:

- GNLU Law Review
- Gujarat Law Journal
- GNLU Journal of Law Development and Politics
- GNLU Journal of Law & Economics
- GNLU Law and Society Review
- GNLU Student Law Review
- GNLU Journal of Law and Sports

=== Legal Incubation Centre ===
The law school has a specialised incubation centre to mentor law graduates aiming to be legal entrepreneurs. In a bid to instil business skills to start a legal venture, the law school has set centre on the lines on top B-schools. It is the first legal incubation centre of its kind in India. It will give an opportunity to two GNLU graduates at a time to become initial incubates as it aims to create jobs, train entrepreneurs, have innovative start-ups, legal firms, and companies. The incubation centre will be started with Rs 10 lakh to create physical infrastructure such as office space, provide seed funds apart from others to promote entrepreneurship in the knowledge-driven profession.

=== Legal History Museum ===
The Indian Legal History Museum housed at GNLU is aiming to represent the development of civilisation in India by exhibiting artefacts of legal heritage. It is the first legal history museum in India. The museum is divided into three floors, each floor designed in chronological sequence to trace and learn the legal systems of various time lines. It showcases the legal historical contents from the Indus valley civilisation to the Dynasties of Mauryan, Gupta, Shunga, Barhut, Khstrapa, Ganga, Vijaynagar, Palav, Chola, Pala and the Sultanate era. The first floor has exhibits covering the legal history of 14th-18th century CE. The exhibition showcases the later medieval period by depicting various Mughal era and company era texts and icons of Law and Justice. The second floor exhibits the legal history contents from the 19th century CE till date. On the third floor, there is a miniature form of the courtroom of the Supreme Court of India, and a section ‘Around the world’, depicting salient features of the legal systems in different noteworthy countries. The Museum uses all interactive devices to make the visiting experience a learning with entertainment one. The museum also has a reception area with a clock-room and a museo-shop, along with the original certificate of Sardar Patel's admission to the bar at Lincoln's Inn.

== Research ==
Research centres present at GNLU, function in niche areas of economy for the dissemination of specialised knowledge and professional excellence.

- Centre for Law and Society
- Centre for Foreign Policy and Security Studies
- Centre for Sports and Entertainment Law
- Centre for Private International Law
- Centre for Environment, Sustainability & Climate Justice
- Centre for Banking Investment and Taxation
- Centre for Public International Law
- Centre for Corporate and Competition Law
- Centre for Constitutional and Administrative Law
- Centre for Business and Public Policy
- Centre for Intellectual Property Rights
- Centre for Law and Economics
- Centre for Research in Criminal Justice Sciences
- Centre for Healthcare, Ethics, Legal Advocacy and Policy Research
- Centre for Legal History, Philosophy and Tradition

== Student life ==
=== Moot Court Competitions ===
Moot courts and other legal events are held in the university, as a part of the curriculum as well as an extracurricular activity. The university has a Moot Court Committee, popularly known as the MCC for conducting moot courts and allied activities. The MCC also conducts three inter-university moot court competitions, namely the GNLU International Moot Court Competition (GIMC), the GNLU Moot on Securities and Investment Law (GNLUMSIL), and the NHRC-GNLU National Moot Court Competition (NHRC-GNLU NMCC) in collaboration with various law firms and government institutions.

Students from the university have participated in various national and international moot court competitions thereby, winning laurels for the university. GNLU won the India Rounds of the prestigious Philip C. Jessup International Law Moot Court Competition in 2016. In 2017, the university team won the Stetson International Environmental Moot Court Competition. In 2018, the university team won the South Asia Rounds of the Oxford Price Media Law Moot Court Competition. The university team also won the ISRO India Funding Rounds of the Manfred Lachs Space Law Moot Court Competition and the Red Cross International Humanitarian Law Moot Court Competition.

=== Student Activities Committee ===
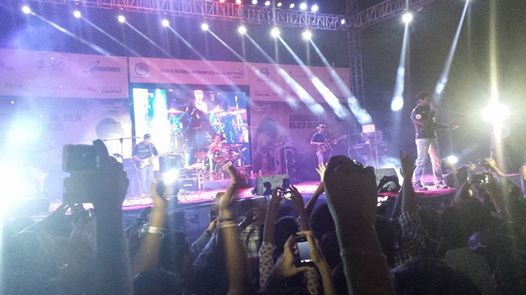
Famous singer KK at the 2014 version of "PENTAGRAM"

The Student Activities Committee, popularly known as SAC is an organisation of students who work to promote extra-curricular activities in the university. The various student activities like acoustic nights and movie nights organised by SAC offers students the much needed break from the busy, officious and monotonous schedule of law school. The SAC caters to diverse student interests varying from cultural pursuits like Music and Dance to literary activities like Quizzing and consists of nine clubs to address the same. The SAC also organises the annual three-day-inter-university literary and cultural fest 'Pentagram'. The event usually scheduled for March every year is marked by different themes on the five days of the week preceding the fest, known as the 'Penta Week'.

=== Sports Committee ===
The Sports Committee of GNLU is charged with organising all the sporting activities of the university. This committee, much like SAC caters to the sports enthusiasts of the university, and organises intra-events throughout the year. It further consists of seven clubs to address enthusiasts of a particular sport, like cricket, football, etc. The Sports Committee is responsible for organising the annual inter-university sports fest 'Justice League' .

=== Student Research and Development Committee ===
The Students Research and Development Committee (SRDC) is a committee run by the students, both LL.B. and LL.M. alike and initiates, designs, develops, plans, executes and monitors all research activities in the university. It was created with an aim to promote the research culture and explore overall research potential of GNLU.

=== Graduate Outcomes ===
Students graduating from GNLU opt to pursue a diverse range of careers, ranging from corporate law firm jobs to jobs in the bar and the bench of the Indian judiciary as well. Apart from this, several undergraduate students get their applications selected for pursuing their graduate studies from esteemed universities such as the University of Oxford, the University of Cambridge, Columbia University, Harvard University, Indian Institute of Management, Ahmedabad etc., and in that process receive prestigious scholarships like the Rhodes Scholarship, the INLAKS Scholarship and the Harlan Fiske Stone Scholarship among others. A few students even get recruited to foreign law firms such as Linklaters and Herbert Smith Freehills. Students also choose to write the UPSC Civil Services Examination and a number of alumni are placed in various levels in the bureaucratic set-up of the country. GNLU alumni are also active in NGOs and Public Policy Think Tanks in India as well as abroad, and a couple of them have started their own start-ups as well.

== Silvassa Campus ==
Gujarat National Law University – Silvassa Campus (GNLU – S) has been established by resolution of the Governing Bodies of Gujarat National Law University which has been empowered under the Gujarat National Law University Act, 2003 as amended by the Gujarat National Law University (Amendment) Act, 2022. GNLU – S is being provided with full support and co-operation by the Government of Union Territory of Dadra and Nagar Haveli and Daman and Diu.

== See also ==
- Legal education in India
- National Academy of Legal Studies and Research

== Sources ==
- gnlu.ac.in/aboutus.htm (archived)
- gnlu.ac.in Vice-chancellor
- University event calendar
