= International Association of Law Schools =

The International Association of Law Schools (IALS) is an independent association of law schools that was established after a series of meetings of legal educators from around the world beginning in 2000. Incorporated under the laws of the District of Columbia in the United States in 2005, its secretariat is based at Cornell Law School. Its membership includes over 170 schools from more than 45 countries.

Its president is Francis S.L. Wang, Dean Emeritus of the Kenneth Wang School of Law at Soochow University.

In 2013, the IALS convened the first-ever Global Law Deans’ Forum at the National University of Singapore Faculty of Law. It was attended by 80 deans from 31 countries, as well as judges including Ghanaian Chief Justice Georgina Wood and Diarmuid O'Scannlain from the U.S. Court of Appeals for the Ninth Circuit. The meeting adopted the Singapore Declaration on Global Standards and Outcomes of a Legal Education, which was intended to offer a “common language” for global legal education.
