= Dharmashastra National Law University =

Law college in India

Coordinates: 23.155°N 79.967°E

Dharmashastra National Law University, Jabalpur
- Motto in English: Truth alone triumphs
- Type: National Law University, Public
- Established: 2018; 8 years ago
- Affiliations: UGC, BCI
- Chancellor: Chief Justice of Madhya Pradesh High Court
- Vice-Chancellor: Dr. Manoj Kumar Sinha
- Visitor: Justice Sheel Nagu
- Location: Jabalpur, Madhya Pradesh
- Campus: Urban
- Website: www.mpdnlu.ac.in

The Dharmashastra National Law University (DNLU) is a National Law University founded in 2018 in Jabalpur, Madhya Pradesh, India. As of 2021, the university is headed by Chief Justice of Madhya Pradesh High Court as the Chancellor and Manoj Kumar Sinha, as the Vice-Chancellor.

== Overview ==
The university has been allotted 120 acres of land close to the Jabalpur Airport. Until its development is completed, the university will function at the Bharat Ratna Bhim Rao Ambedkar Institute of Telecom Training (BRBRAITT) in Jabalpur. DNLU offers a five-year integrated BA-LLB course and one-year LLM programme.

Candidates can be nominated for various scholarships by their home state, other states and the central government.

== Affiliations ==
DNLU Jabalpur is recognised by the University Grants Commission (UGC) as a state university.

== Research centres ==
- Centre for studies in International Trade and Investment Law
- Centre For Alternative Dispute Resolution
- Centre For Research In Competition Law And Policy
- Centre For Criminal Justice Administration
- Centre For Environmental Law
- Centre For Research And Studies In Human Rights

== Legal Aid Clinic 'Vidhi Mitra' ==
Dharmashastra National Law University launched a legal aid clinic named 'Vidhi Mitra' on 18 December 2020 with the aim to raise awareness and empower individuals regarding legal issues. It also launched a program named 'Adhyapan' which provides educational aid for financially disadvantaged students.
