= Maharashtra National Law University, Mumbai =

National Law University in Mumbai, Maharashtra, India

Coordinates: 19.119103°N 72.915244°E

- Other names: MNLUM , NLU Mumbai
- Motto: Dharme Tatparta
- Motto in English: Righteous readiness
- Type: National Law University
- Established: 2014; 12 years ago
- Affiliations: UGC, BCI
- Chancellor: Justice Alok Aradhe
- Vice-Chancellor: Dr. Dilip Ukey
- Location: Mumbai, Maharashtra, India
- Campus: 35 acres (under construction)
- Colours: Ocean Blue
- Website: http://mnlumumbai.edu.in/

Maharashtra National Law University, Mumbai (MNLU, Mumbai or NLU, Mumbai ) is a National Law University located at Mumbai, Maharashtra, India.

NLU Mumbai is considered one among the Top 10 Law University of India & one of the finest around the globe .

== Courses ==
MNLU Mumbai offers a five-year integrated B.A LL.B.(Hons.) programme and LL.M. Programmes. Students have to qualify CLAT to secure admission to the UG or PG courses offered by the university. Admissions at NLU Mumbai are through Common Law Admission Test (CLAT) considered one among the Top-10 toughest entrance examinations in India / Country. 100 seats are filled up by CLAT and 20 supernumerary seats are reserved for Foreign National/ NRI/ NRI Sponsored quota, Two supernumerary seats are reserved for permanent residents of Jammu and Kashmir.

== Administration ==
Chief Justice of India is the Chancellor of the university and Bhavani Prasad Panda was the founder Vice Chancellor (VC) of the university. As of December 2024 Prof.(Dr.) Dilip Ukey is the VC. Students have performed well in various fields such as: literary and debating competitions, cultural competitions, moot court competitions, alternate dispute resolution competitions.

MNLU Mumbai has entered into MoUs with various institutions including L’Universite’ Paris Nanterre and Berlin School of Economics and Law (BSEL), Germany, thereby facilitating regular student exchange programmes with these universities.

For the first two years MNLU Mumbai shared its campus with Tata Institute of Social Sciences. In 2017 it shifted its campus to the Centre for Excellence in Telecom Technology and Management at Hiranandani Gardens, Powai, Mumbai.

The university has a slight disadvantage and that is that it does not have its own residential campus like other NLUs due to some legal, geographical and other issues due to which it operates in a well maintained rented campus / building in the Powai area of Mumbai.

The construction of its permanent campus has already begun by the government. The permanent campus of MNLU Mumbai, will be constructed on a 35-acre land that has been handed over to MNLU Mumbai, at Pahadi Goregaon village and on 3 October 2024, the Government of Maharashtra approved 184 crore Indian Rupees to set up its own permanent full-fledged residential campus.

The university also runs various extra credit and certificate courses such as Mediation, Data Protection Law and foreign languages such as German and Spanish on a regular basis.

MNLU Mumbai, is steered by various high ranking and famous judges, advocates, bureaucrats and academics as members of its governing bodies.

The university has already established the following research centres:

1. Centre for Clinical Legal Education (CCLE)
2. Centre for Maritime Law and Research (CML&R)
3. Centre for Research in Criminal Justice (CRCJ)
4. Centre for Information and Communication Technology and Law (CICTL)
5. Centre for Goods and Services Tax and Training (CGSTT)
6. Centre for Mediation & Research

Due to its present location students have variety of internship opportunities as various civil and criminal courts and principal bench of Bombay High Court is within the city.
