= NALSAR University of Law =

Public law school in Telangana, India

Coordinates: 17°36′16″N 78°32′49″E

- Other names: National Academy for Legal Studies and Research University
- Motto: Dharme Sarvam Pratishthitam
- Motto in English: "All are supported by Dharma" (Note: From the Mahanarayana Upanishad, Section 79, Verse 7.)
- Type: National Law University
- Established: 1998; 28 years ago
- Affiliations: UGC, BCI
- Chancellor: Chief Justice of Telangana High Court
- Vice-Chancellor: Srikrishna Deva Rao
- Location: Shamirpet, Secunderabad, Telangana, 500101, India
- Campus: Suburban, 55 acres (22.3 ha)
- Website: www.nalsar.ac.in

The NALSAR University of Law (National Academy of Legal Studies and Research University of Law) (Note: Name changed by an amendment in 2005 to the NALSAR Act "National Academy of Legal Studies and Research University (Amendment) Act, 2005 (Act No. 7 of 2005)" (PDF). prsindia.org.) is a public law school and a National Law University located in Shamirpet, Hyderabad, Telangana, India.

The school was among the first universities to offer a five-year integrated undergraduate law degree, postgraduate law degree and doctorate law degree. It has an intake of around 132 students from a pool of around 100,000 applicants in its undergraduate law programme, with admissions usually offered to students in the top 200 ranks; an acceptance rate of 0.2%.

As of 2025, NALSAR University of Law ranked #3 among law schools in India.

== Campus ==
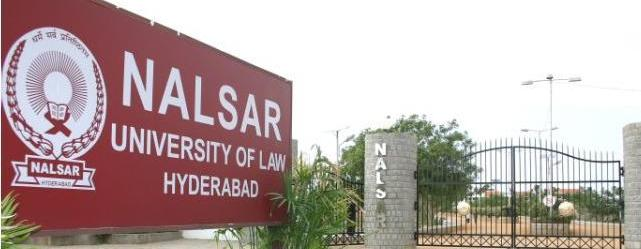
Entrance to the University

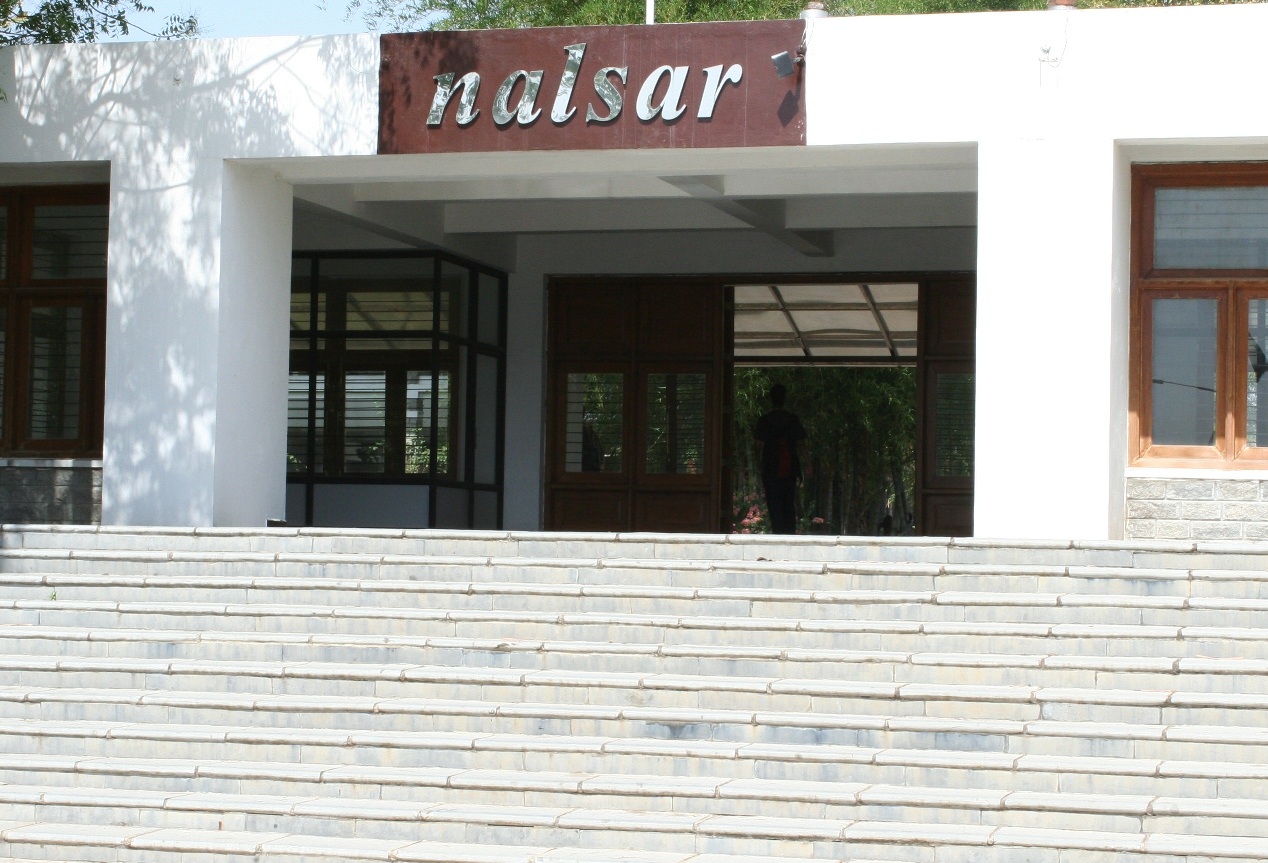
Entrance to the Academic Block

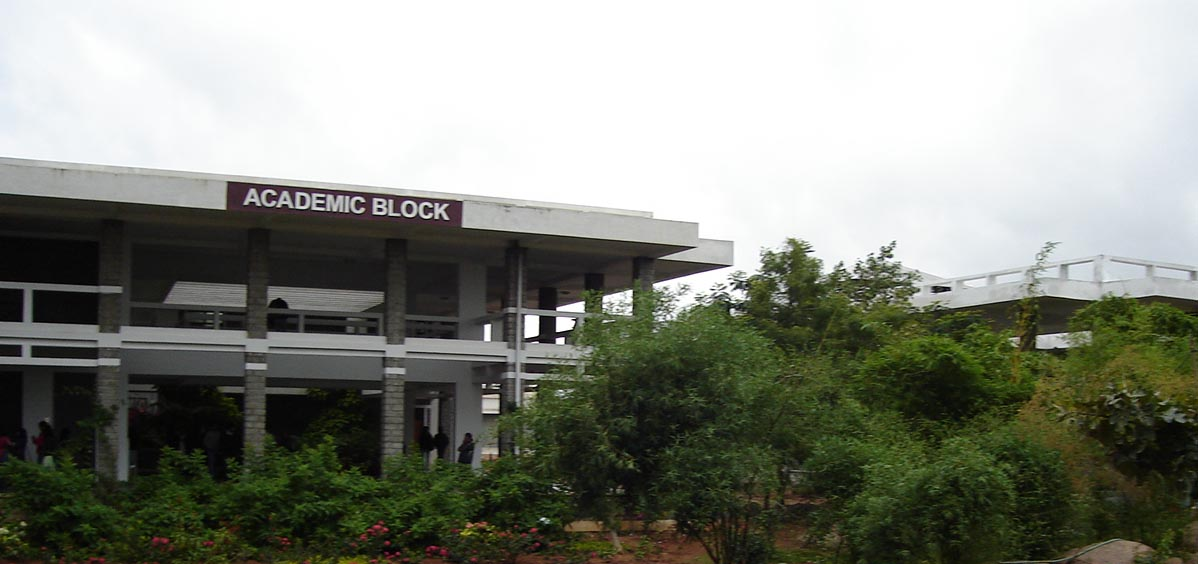
The Academic Block

The NALSAR campus is spread over 55 acre (22 hectare), divided into five precincts. The first is the Administrative Block adjoining the Academic Block. The latter consists of the classrooms, conference halls, the library, the internet centre, a moot court hall, and research centres. The residential block consists of seven separate hostels for boys and girls each. The stadium forms the fourth while the law school dining hall forms the fifth. Miscellaneous structures include the commemorative 'Keerthi Stambh' and a replica of 'The Thinker' by Auguste Rodin.

The campus also has an auditorium, with a seating capacity around 500, inaugurated in 2016. The entire campus is WiFi network enabled.

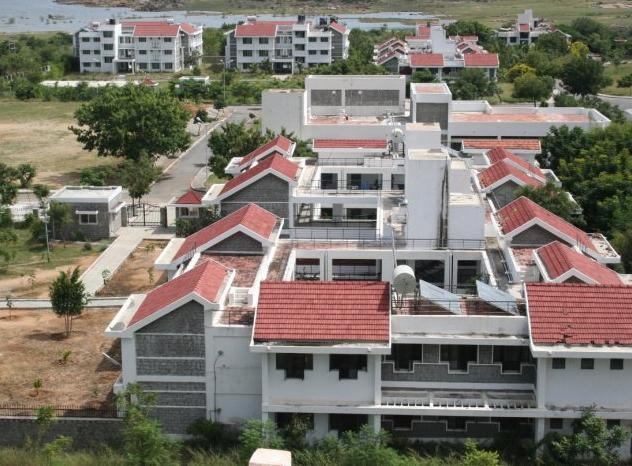
Boys' Hostel

== Academics ==
=== Undergraduate degree ===
NALSAR offers a five-year integrated B.A LL.B.(Hons.) program and Integrated Program of Management (BBA+MBA). Admission to the undergraduate program is on the basis of the Common Law Admission Test (CLAT) which is taken by upwards of 100,000 students every year. With only about 160 seats offered at NALSAR, the program is considered highly selective. NALSAR follows a credit-based elective system, with certain mandatory courses, which require students to earn 200 credits over a period of five years to earn the degree.

=== Postgraduate degrees ===
NALSAR offers a one-year postgraduate LL.M. program. About 80 seats are offered through the Common Law Admission Test (CLAT). About ten areas of specialisation are offered, and the program requirements include a dissertation. Additionally, two-year (four semesters) self-financed master's degree in Business Laws and Administration (MBLA)is also offered by the university apart from a one-year Master of Philosophy (M.Phil.) which is open to candidate with an LL.M. degree, and a Doctor of Philosophy (Ph.D.). As a first among the Indian National Law Universities, starting academic year 2013–14, NALSAR now also offers a two-year M.B.A. program.

Similarly, CASL has introduced innovative courses in Aviation, Space, Telecommunications, GIS and Remote Sensing. Its objective is to cater to the unprecedented growth and commercialisation of the Aviation, Space and Telecom sectors. CASL's initiative aims to institutionalise an academy-industry partnership in these sectors- a first of its kind, not just in India but perhaps in the entire Asia-Pacific Region. It offers the following two degrees: Master's Degree in Aviation Law and Air Transport Management (MALATM) and a master's degree in Space and Telecommunication Laws (MSTL).

NALSAR Pro offers PG Diploma courses in Patents Law, Cyber Laws, Media Laws and International Humanitarian Laws using web technology and direct contact programs at various centers in India. CASL offers a PG Diploma in Aviation Law and Air Transport Management (PGDALATM) and a PG Diploma in GIS & Remote Sensing Laws (PGDGRL).

=== Rankings ===
NALSAR is a top ranking law school in India. The National Institutional Ranking Framework (NIRF) ranked the institute third in its law ranking of 2025.

=== Department of Management Studies (DoMS) ===
With a focus on business and legal practice, the DoMS was created to provide graduates with additional instruction surrounding management specifically. Within the department, the five-year Integrated Program in Management (IPM) assists students interested in Business Management as a career path; it is designed as a comprehensive management program for students after class XII. Eligible students are awarded a Bachelor of Business Administration (BBA) and Master of Business Administration (MBA) by NALSAR after successful completion of the program.

University rankings

Law – India
- NIRF (2024): 3

Consisting of fifteen terms spread across five years, the first 3 years of the program are aimed at providing strong theoretical underpinnings, and conceptual and practical insights in the various areas of philosophy, psychology, fine arts, mathematics, economics, law, and management. The last 2 years are aimed at nurturing holistic transformation from students into future business leaders and managers.

DoMS offers a voluntary exit to the students after successfully completing the program requirement at the end of 3 years and such students shall be awarded a degree of Bachelor of Business Administration (BBA)

== Research ==
=== Centres ===
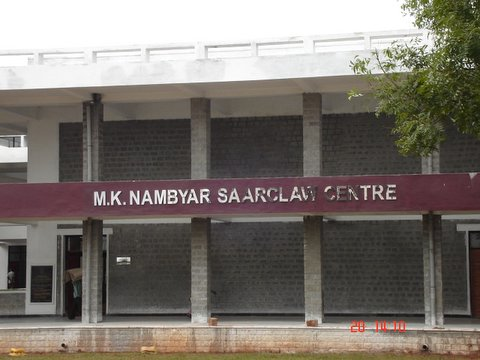
The SAARClaw Centre

NALSAR houses research centres:

- Animal Law Centre (ALC)
- M.K. Nambyar SAARC Law Research Centre
- Centre for Air and Space Law
- Centre for Land Rights
- Centre for Corporate Law and Governance
- Dr. N.C. Banerjee Centre for Intellectual Property Law Studies
- Dr. S.P. Chatterjee Centre for Environmental Law Studies
- Centre for Proximate and Continuing Education (C-PACE)
- Centre for Humanitarian Law and Refugee Law
- Centre for Alternative Dispute Resolution
- Centre for Media Law and Public Policy
- Centre for Legal Philosophy and Justice Education
- Centre for Tax Laws
- Centre for Culture, Law and Society (C-CLS)
- Centre for Constitutional Law, Policy & Good Governance
- Centre for Criminal Justice Administration and Human Rights
- Centre for Disaster Management and Law
- Centre for Family Law
- Justice B.P. Jeevan Reddy Centre for International Trade and Business Laws
- Centre for Tribal and Land Rights
- Milon K Banerji Arbitration Centre

=== Library ===
NALSAR's library has a collection of more than 27,000 items comprising law reports, reviews, periodicals, manuals and choicest publications of textbooks and other resources. The Law Resource Center is the hub of all library activities and aims at fulfilling the research and academic objectives of the university. Its rich collection of primary and secondary legal resources is accessible to all the users in the campus. The VPN-configured Online Public Access Catalogue (OPAC) is accessible from any terminal in and out of the campus. It is designed to provide online information on the availability of titles and to allow the patrons to request for items that are on loan, renewal of books, access to patron accounts and other information services. Unlike the traditional OPACS, each record provides bibliographic information with hot links to the table of contents pages, reviews, publishers' notes, and peer driven reviews and ratings. The library has a depository of UN collections. A separate section houses all the proceedings of the organs of the United Nations. The print collection is augmented by online access.

=== Published journals ===
NALSAR publishes the following law journals:

- Indian Journal of Air and Space Law ( IJASL)
- M. K. Nambyar SAARC Law Journal
- NALSAR Law Review
- NALSAR Student Law Review
- Journal of Corporate Affairs and Corporate Crimes
- Indian Journal of Constitutional Law
- Media Law Review
- Environmental Law & Practice Review
- The Indian Journal Law & Economics
- Nalsar ADR Journal
- Indian Journal of Intellectual Property Law

The Library is also equipped with an Accessibility Lab with specialised equipment designed to support students with disabilities. These equipment includes PEARL Scanners, Braille Printer, JAWS and NVDA Screen readers and OpenBook.

== Student life ==
=== Moot court competitions ===
Nalsar students have excelled in mooting in both the national as well as international domain.

It was ranked among the top in the world at the international rounds of the Philip C. Jessup Moot Court Competition 2006 at Washington, D.C. In 2007, Nalsar was placed among the top eight teams in the world, at the Philip C. Jessup International Law Moot Court Competition. In 2010, the team from Nalsar finished as semi-finalists in the Jessup International Law Moot Competition.

NALSAR made it to the top 12 teams and competed in the International Finals of the 11th Annual Stetson Environmental Moot Court Competition held at Stetson University College of Law, Florida in November 2006. Nalsar finished as runners-up in the first edition of the ICC Trial Competition at The Hague, a feat it repeated in 2011. In 2009, Nalsar won the D.M. Harish International Moot Court Competition. The team also won the Best Speaker and Best Researcher prizes. In 2011, Nalsar were the semi-finalists in the Asia-Pacific rounds of the Manfred Lachs Moot Court Competition. In 2012, Nalsar won the Monroe E. Price International Media Law Moot Court Competition at the University of Oxford.

In 2014, Nalsar won the Willem C. Vis International Commercial Arbitration Moot Court Competition, conducted at Vienna.

Nalsar was judged the best in India in mooting in the first two seasons of the Mooting Premiere League in 2009-2010 and 2010–2011.

=== Debating ===
NALSAR won India's oldest Parliamentary Debate at St. Stephens College, Delhi in December 2005. This was followed by victories at the Annual Parliamentary Debate held at the Indian Institute of Technology, Madras in January 2007 and 2009, the debate conducted by the Indian Institute of Information Technology, Hyderabad in February 2007, and that of the Young Orators Club of Secunderabad in 2008. NALSAR further cemented its reputation on the debating circuit by winning the inaugural IIM Bangalore Parliamentary Debating Championship 'Cicero' in January 2009.

The NALSAR Intervarsity Debating Championship is the pioneer of the British Parliamentary Debating format in India. The idea for the NALSAR IV was born to introduce the British Parliamentary debate format to the national debating circuit and provide a preparatory ground for the WUDC (World Universities Debating Championship), the most prestigious debating championship in the world. Thus, the NALSAR IV is aimed at exposing debaters to the most competitive standards of adjudication. The NALSAR IV has now earned the name to be one of the most prestigious debating championships in India.

=== Quizzing ===
NALSAR finished as runners-up in the K-Circle India Quiz 2010 and 2011, as well as winners in BITS Pilani-Hyderabad Campus' annual fest Pearl 2012, 2013 and 2015. A 4th year team won the Best College Team title at the Landmark Quiz held at Hyderabad on 6 October 2013. NALSAR also finished second in Manipal's Quiz on The Beach 2015 and Tata Crucible Hyderabad 2015. A team won the Economic Times in Campus Quiz for two years consecutively in 2014 and 2015. The university has also hosted its own QuizFests, titled 'Interrobang'.

=== Gender-neutral University ===
In March 2022, NALSAR announced its plans to go gender neutral. It created gender-neutral spaces in its hostels and washrooms. It also proposed to do away with Mr and Miss in the certificates / degrees. NALSAR is adopting a policy on Inclusive Education for Sexual and Gender Minorities, which will take into consideration self-affirmed gender of the students irrespective of their legal identification in birth certificates or Aadhaar cards.

== See also ==
- Legal education in India
- National Law School of India University
- Gujarat National Law University
