= Fletcher International Insolvency Law Moot =

- Established: 2017
- Venue: Varies
- Subject matter: International insolvency law
- Class: International
- Record participation: 47 teams (2026)
- Qualification: Written submissions
- Most championships: Singapore Management University (3)
- Website: http://www.ianfletcherinsolvencymoot.com/

The Fletcher International Insolvency Law Moot or Fletcher Moot is an international moot court competition on international insolvency law and international commercial litigation. The moot, which is named after Professor Ian Fletcher, was established in 2017 as the first ever moot on cross-border insolvency law. The venue of the moot rotates every year and has thus far been held in four countries.

There is one qualifying written round for which the top 8–12 submissions are chosen out of a field of 20–30 teams, and the oral round finals are held in conjunction with conference proceedings organised by, among others, INSOL International and the International Insolvency Institute. For the oral phase, each team argues in up to four preliminary matches; in the first two editions, the top four teams qualified for the knockout stages. In 2019, quarterfinals were introduced for the first time.

The 2021 edition went fully online as travel restrictions remained in place due to COVID-19; teams mooted sitting down instead of standing up, with no option for team members being located in the same venue. The 2022 edition was also run entirely online, as were the 2023 to 2025 editions despite all notable competitions resuming with the in-person format.

Year	Total number of teams	Venue	Champion (win number)	1st runner-up (win number)	2nd runner-up (win number)	Best Oralist in General Rounds (win number)	Best Oralist in Championship Round (win number)	Best Memorials (win number)	Highest Ranked Team in General Rounds (number of times)
2017	14	Sydney	Singapore Management University (1)	National University of Singapore (1)	* Chicago-Kent College of Law (1) * University of British Columbia (1)	Singapore Management University (1)	Singapore Management University (1)	National University of Singapore (1)	
2018	18	Vancouver	University of British Columbia (1)	University of Queensland (1)	* National University of Singapore (1) * Singapore Management University (1)	University of Queensland (1)	University of British Columbia (1)	University of Queensland (1)	
2019	21	Singapore	National Law Institute University (1)	University of British Columbia (1)	* National University of Singapore (2) * Singapore Management University (2)	* 1st: Leiden University (1) * 2nd: National University of Singapore (1)	National Law Institute University (1)	* 1st: Leiden University (1) * 2nd: Dr Ram Manohar Lohiya National Law University (1)	National University of Singapore (1)
2020	28	London	Singapore Management University (2)	Jindal Global Law School (1)	* National Law University Odisha (1) * University College London (1)	* 1st: University College London (1) * 2nd: Singapore Management University (1)	Singapore Management University (2)	* 1st: National Law University Odisha (1) * 2nd: Singapore Management University (1)	Singapore Management University (1)
2021 (online)	34	Virtual due to COVID-19	National University of Singapore (1)	West Bengal National University of Juridical Sciences (1)	* Singapore Management University (3) * University of British Columbia (2)	* 1st: National University of Singapore * 2nd: Higher School of Economics	National University of Singapore (1)	* 1st: Singapore Management University (1) * 2nd: City Law School (1)	National University of Singapore (2)
2022 (online)	20	Virtual due to COVID-19	Monash University (1)	National University of Singapore (2)	* Dr Ram Manohar Lohiya National Law University (1) * Symbiosis Law School, Pune (1)	* 1st: Chicago-Kent College of Law (1) * 2nd: Singapore Management University (2)	Monash University (1)	*1st: Symbiosis Law School, Pune * 2nd: Monash University	BPP University (1)
2023 (online)	20	Virtual	University College London (1)	Damodaram Sanjivayya National Law University (1)	* Singapore Management University (4) * Dr Ram Manohar Lohiya National Law University (1)	Damodaram Sanjivayya National Law University (1)	University College London (1)	* 1st: Hidyatullah National Law University (1) * 2nd: China University of Political Science and Law (1)	Damodaram Sanjivayya National Law University (1)
2024 (online)	32	Virtual	Singapore Management University (3)	National University of Advanced Legal Studies (1)	* Dr Ram Manohar Lohiya National Law University (2) * University College London (2)	* 1st: University of Malawi (1) * 2nd: Singapore Management University (3)	National University of Advanced Legal Studies (1)	* 1st: China University of Political Science and Law (1) * 2nd: University College London (1)	National University of Singapore (3)
2025 (online)	38	Virtual	Symbiosis Law School, Pune (1)	Singapore Management University (1)	* *	* 1st: Singapore Management University (2) * 2nd:	Singapore Management University (3)	Singapore Management University (2)	Singapore Management University (2)
2026	47	Hybrid							
