= Air Law Moot =

- Established: 2010
- Venue: Varies
- Subject matter: Aviation law
- Class: International
- Record participation: 41 teams (2018)
- Qualification: National rounds
- Most championships: Ram Manohar University (3)
- Website: https://www.airlawmootcourt.com/

The Leiden – Sarin International Air Law Moot Court Competition is an international moot competition organised by Leiden University. It was started in 2010 by the university's International Institute of Air and Space Law and by India's Sarin Memorial Legal-Aid Foundation, the legal aid arm of Sarin & Co. The mock aviation law proceedings are before the International Court of Justice. The international rounds of the competition comprise a mix of teams that proceed directly and teams that have qualified from the national rounds. Two preliminary rounds are held to determine the best applicant and respondent sides, who would then face off in the championship final. Due to the pandemic, the 2020 edition only awarded memorial prizes, while the 2021 edition was held online.

Year	Total number of teams	Champion (win number)	1st runner-up (win number)	Best Oralist (win number)	Best Applicant Memorial (win number)	Best Respondent Memorial (win number)
2022						
2021 (online)	35	Ram Manohar University (3)	Chinese University of Hong Kong (1)	National Law University, Jodhpur (1)	National University of Singapore (1)	National University of Singapore (1)
2020	35	NA	NA	NA	Singapore Management University (1)	Chinese University of Hong Kong (1)
2019	30	National University of Singapore (2)	Leiden University (2)	University of Cologne (1)	Leiden University (2)	McGill University (1)
2018	41	Rajiv Gandhi National University of Law (1)	Singapore Management University (1)	Army Institute of Law (1)	Wuhan University (1)	National and Kapodistrian University (1)
2017	30	National University of Singapore (1)	West Bengal National University of Juridical Sciences (1)	National University of Kyiv-Mohyla Academy (1)	West Bengal National University of Juridical Sciences (1)	West Bengal National University of Juridical Sciences (1)
2016	26	Ram Manohar University (2)	National University of Singapore (1)	Ram Manohar University (1)		
2015	21	University of Queensland (1)	National Law School of India University (1)			
2014	18	Leiden University (2)	China University of Political Science & Law (1)		Leiden University (1)	Leiden University (1)
2013	14	China University of Political Science & Law (1)	McGill University (2)			
2012	12	Ram Manohar University (1)	Leiden University (1)			
2011	10	McGill University (1)	NALSAR University of Law (1)			
2010	10	Leiden University (1)	McGill University (1)			
