= Damodaram Sanjivayya National Law University =

Law University in Andhra Pradesh, India

- Motto: Yato Dharmastato Jayah
- Motto in English: Act Dharma - Thus get victory
- Type: National Law University
- Established: 2008; 18 years ago
- Affiliations: UGC, BCI
- Endowment: ₹35 crores
- Chancellor: Chief Justice of Andhra Pradesh High Court
- Vice-Chancellor: Dasari Surya Prakash Rao
- Visitor: Justice Pamidighantam Sri Narasimha
- Location: Nyayaprastha, Sabbavaram, Anakapalli district, Andhra Pradesh, India; 17.73738°N 83.338519°E
- Campus: Subbavaram
- Colors: Azure; Cyan-lime Green
- Website: dsnlu.ac.in

Damodaram Sanjivayya National Law University (DSNLU) is a National Law University located at Sabbavaram, Anakapalli district, Andhra Pradesh, India constituted by the DSNLU Act, 2008. It offers five year integrated B.A LLB. (Hons.) course to eligible Undergraduate students based on the Common Law Admission Test centralized admission process. The University offers postgraduate courses also, including the one-year LL.M. programme and, PhD and LL.D. programmes. The university is housed at Nyayaprastha in Sabbavaram with 45.6 acres built up area in the first phase. The establishing Act of 2008 of the Andhra Pradesh Legislative Assembly (Act No. 32 of 2008), had provided the main campus at Visakhapatnam. It is named after the second Chief minister of Andhra Pradesh, Damodaram Sanjivayya.

== Academics ==
DSNLU is one of the National Law Universities of India in the National Law University system of legal education in India. It has a similar academic structure as other National Law Universities within the system. It regularly organises seminars and conferences, with distinguished guests and experts both for academic audiences and policy-setting audiences.

DSNLU conducts teaching in law and allied disciplines, with emphasis on practical training of the students in technical skills of the profession through Moot Courts, Seminars, Project Reports, Expert Lectures, work and internships in law chambers, Court visits and conducting Legal aid and Legal literacy camps in parts of the country, with one being "Abhyeti" conducted in Bhopal.

=== Admissions ===
Admissions to DSNLU are made through the Common Law Admission Test (CLAT), which serves as the qualifying examination for the university. Out of a total of 120 seats, 60 are reserved for students from the state of Andhra Pradesh, 48 for all India General category and 12 for NRI and foreign national candidates.

=== Moot court ===
The first national moot court competition of DSNLU was held on 15 & 16 February 2014. The second national moot court competition was held by the University on 6 to 8 March 2015. The third national moot was conducted in the last week of February, 2017. Along with the national moot, the University conducted a statewide moot for the students of Telangana and Andhra Pradesh, the 1st D.V. Subba Rao Memorial Moot Court competition on 11 and 12 April 2015 in honour of D. V. Subba Rao, an advocate and legal luminary of Visakhapatnam.

== Administration ==
The government appointed Prof. A. Lakshminath as the first Chancellor, Y. Satyanarayana as the First Vice-Chancellor and Amancherla Subrahmanyam as the first Registrar of the university. After the DSNLU Amendment Act, 2016 had been notified, the Hon'ble Chief Justice of the High Court of Andhra Pradesh is the ex-officio Chancellor of the University. The current chancellor of DSNLU is Hon'ble Justice Lisa Gill and Vice-Chancellor is Prof. Dasari Surya Prakash Rao.

=== Vice chancellors ===
No.	Vice chancellor	Took office	Left office	Milestones during term as VC
01	Y. Satyanarayana	2008	2011	Founder VC of DSNLU
02	R. G. Babu Bhagavath Kumar	2011	2015	Founded DSNLU National Moot Court competition • Established MoUs with other NLUs • Started overseeing construction of new campus at Sabbavaram • Presided over first convocation in December 2014
03	G.S.N. Raju	2015	2016
04	E.A. Narayana	February 2016	June 2016
05	V. Kesava Rao	2016	December 2018	Made the shift to the new campus at Nyayaprastha • Established Centre for Advanced Research in Dispute Settlement (CARDS) • Conducted first placement drive
06	S. Surya Prakash	December 2018	June 2023
07	Dasari Surya Prakash Rao	2023	Incumbent

== Faculty ==
The faculty of DSNLU includes faculties from various National Law Universities like National Law School of India University, Gujarat National Law University, NALSAR, The West Bengal National University of Juridical Sciences, National Law University, Jodhpur, Chanakya National Law University, Hidayatullah National Law University, Dr. Ram Manohar Lohia National Law University.

In addition to the permanent staff, eminent jurists, judges, lawyers and academics serve as guest faculty. Members of the World Intellectual Property Organization, Tata Institute of Social Sciences and many other eminent personalities take guest lectures.
