= Jean Pictet =

Swiss jurist and legal practitioner (1914–2002)

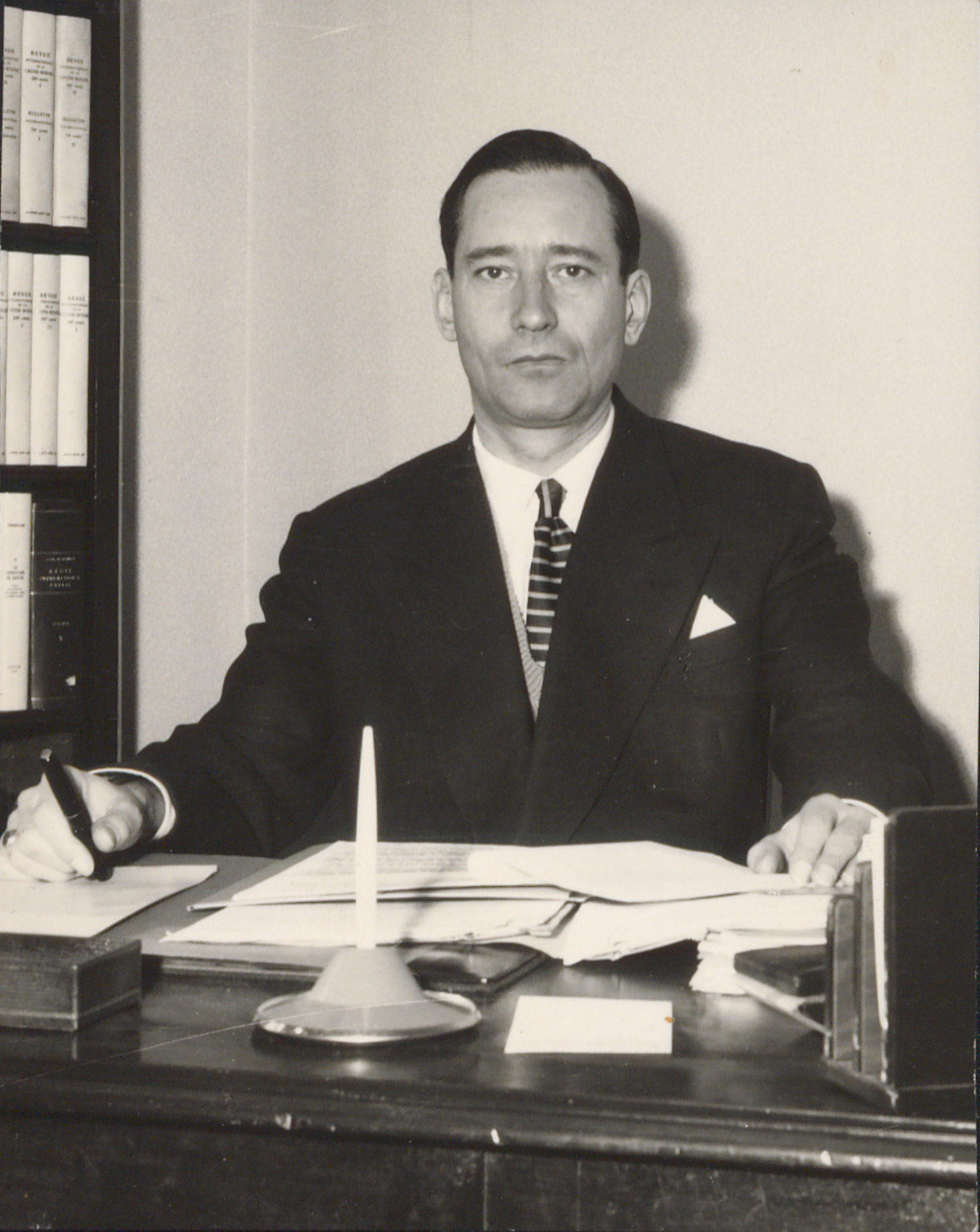
- Jean Pictet in 1937
- Born: 2 September 1914; Geneva
- Died: 30 March 2002 (aged 87); Meyrin
- Education: University of Geneva
- Occupations: Jurist, lawyer, international humanitarian law expert
- Known for: Drafting the 1949 Geneva Conventions, formulating the Seven Fundamental Principles of the Red Cross

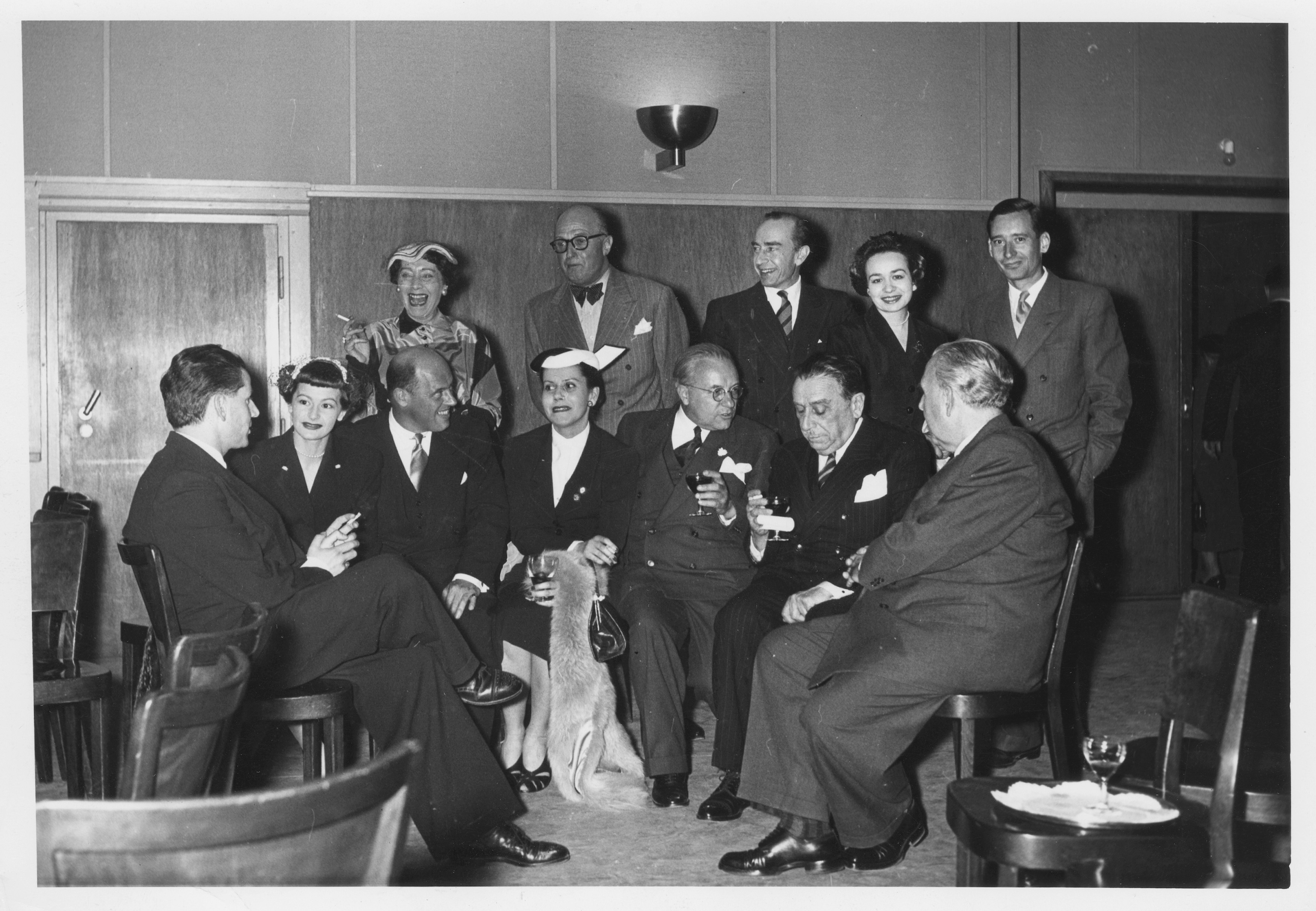
Jean Pictet (standing at the back, first on the right), Director of the International Committee of the Red Cross (ICRC), at Radio Geneva during a broadcast for World Red Cross Day.

Jean Simon Pictet (2 September 1914, Geneva – 30 March 2002, Meyrin) was a Swiss citizen, jurist, legal practitioner working in international humanitarian law. During the Second World War, working directly with ICRC President Max Huber, he was the primary author of the ICRC appeals for the protection of prisoners of war and war-affected civilians. First as a secretary-jurist, and then as a senior executive and Vice-President of the International Committee of the Red Cross (ICRC), Pictet played a major role in drafting the 1949 Geneva Conventions for the protection of victims of war, their Commentaries, and negotiating the 1977 Additional Protocols (Protocol I and Protocol II). He authored the four volume Les Principes de la Croix-Rouge ("The Principles of the Red Cross"), prepared by him and published in 1955, which helped shape the Red Cross Movement's seven Fundamental Principles, and led to the adoption of the seven fundamental principles of the Red Cross by the 20th International Conference of the Red Cross in Vienna in 1965. In 1989, the Jean-Pictet Competition, an international humanitarian law competition for students, was founded and named after him.

== Early life ==
Pictet was the son of Lucien Pictet, a prominent Swiss entrepreneur, politician, and engineer. After completing his secondary education in Paris, he finished his legal studies at the University of Geneva, earned a doctorate in 1935, and subsequently practiced law in Vienna and Geneva.

After secondary education in Paris, Pictet completed his study of law at the University of Geneva, earning a doctorate in 1935 and then practiced law in Vienna and Geneva.

== Career ==
=== Humanitarian career ===
In 1937, he joined the International Committee of the Red Cross as an assistant legal adviser. During the Second World War he wrote most of the ICRC's appeals on behalf of prisoners of wars and civilian victims of the war. and was one of the key staff of the Committee and worked directly with ICRC President Max Huber.

Pictet was responsible for directing the establishment of the general report on the work of the ICRC during the Second World War. Under his leadership as chief responsible officer, he prepared the general report on the activities of the ICRC during global conflicts was prepared. Even before the war ended, he started on a complete overhaul of the Geneva Conventions, in particular advocating for including the protection of civilians, despite Huber's pessimism about its prospects. Following the end of the Second World War, he assumed responsibility for preparing the documentation for the four Geneva Conventions on the protection of war victims, which were finalised in 1949. Pictet also participated as an expert in organising the 1949 diplomatic conference.

He began work on revising the Regulations of the Red Cross International and creating agreements with the League of Red Cross and ran for ICRC leadership in 1952. Under his leadership, the ICRC delegation participated in negotiations that led to the 1952 revision of the International Red Cross regulations and the conclusion of agreements with the League of Red Cross Societies.

In 1965, he proposed the seven fundamental principles of the Red Cross movement. These principles are humanity, impartiality, neutrality, independence, voluntary service, unity, and universality.

He also chaired the conference of experts who prepared for the negotiations on the two 1977 Additional Protocols to the Geneva Conventions. He also personally drafted the texts of those protocols.

From 1967 to 1979, he was a member of the ICRC Executive Board, restricted to 25 Swiss citizens and from 1971 to 1979 he served as the Vice President of the board.

Following his retirement in December 1984, he dedicated himself to research on the history of North American Indigenous peoples, summarising his findings in a two-volume work published in 1988.

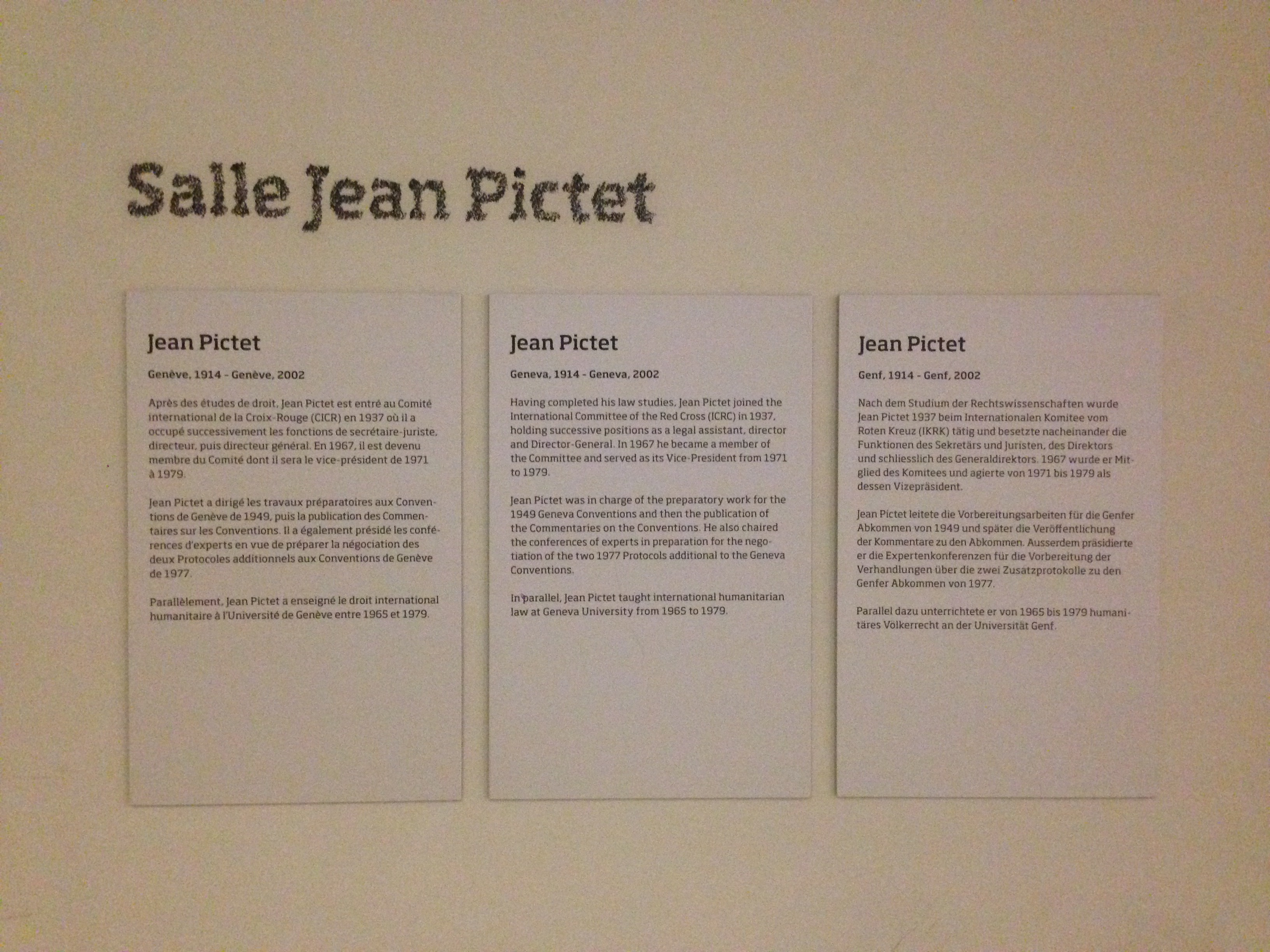
Jean Pictet hall at the International Red Cross and Red Crescent Museum

=== Teaching career ===
He lectured at The Hague Academy of International Law in 1950. He also gave lectures at the International Institute of Human Rights in 1971, 1972, and 1982. From 1975 to 1981, he was director and president of the Henry Dunant Institute, an educational research and training institution where International Red Cross specialists are taught.

Pictet also worked at the University of Geneva, initially as a lecturer. He was an Associate Professor 1974 to 1979 there in the Faculty of Law. Following that, he became head of the Department of International Humanitarian Law at the university. Pictet was later appointed as a Professor of International Humanitarian Law at the Faculty of Law at the University of Geneva.

== Selected publications ==
Pictet was the main author of the commentary on the four Geneva Conventions of 1949. In 1977, he completed the commentary on the two additional protocols. The four volumes of commentaries on the Conventions, for which Pictet was the primary author and general editor, are consistently used by many who apply the conventions in their professional activities.

His short 1955 volume Les Principes de la Croix-Rouge (Red Cross Principles) helped formulate common principles of the different organisations of the Red Cross Movement, and led to the unanimous adoption by the 1965 20th International Conference of the Red Cross in Vienna, of the seven Fundamental Principles of the Red Cross. He was also involved in drafting the statutes of the Movement.

His other writing includes several works on international humanitarian law and writings about the Native Americans in North America. (Note: L'épopée des peaux-rouges published in 1988 and La grande storia degli indiani d'America, published in 2000.)

== Awards ==
Pictet received honorary doctorates in law from the universities of Leiden, Zurich, and the Catholic University of Leuven.

He received several awards from the International Red Cross and Red Crescent Movement. In 1984, he was awarded the Gold Medal of the Red Cross for his career. In 1999, he was given the gold-plated silver medal "Grateful Geneva". He was awarded the Henry Dunant Medal posthumously in 2005, the highest award of the movement.

== Death and legacy ==
He published the 1948 "Report of the International Committee of the Red Cross on its activities during the Second World War." (Note: The period it covered was from 1 September 1939 to 30 June 1947.)

Pictet was one of the main people involved in the drafting the 1949 Geneva Conventions for the protection of war victims, preparing their commentaries, drafting the 1977 Additional Protocols (Protocol I and Protocol II), and conducting negotiations regarding them.

In 1989, the annual Jean-Pictet Competition on international humanitarian law was established and named in his honour. The Competition was started by Michel Deyra of the University of Clermont-Ferrand in France, however, it is hosted in different countries each year. The competition is a bilingual international student moot competition, designed around role playing practical scenarios that enable those competing to "take law out of the books." Participants pretend to be ICRC delegates and treaty negotiators and it requires a varied use of law with opportunities in which to apply documents such as the ICRC commentaries, Geneva Conventions, and Additional Protocols. The Competition is a different format than a simulated appellate court and other grand slam moots. Participants are marked not just on their knowledge of the law, but also their teamwork and collaboration. Current and former participants are known as "Picteists".
