= Frankfurt Investment Arbitration Moot Court =

Frankfurt Investment Arbitration Moot
- Established: 2007
- Venue: Frankfurt
- Subject matter: Investment arbitration
- Class: Grand Slam
- Record participation: 80 teams (2025); Online: 105 teams (2022)
- Qualification: National/regional rounds
- Most championships: Singapore Management University (3)
- Website: http://www.investmentmoot.org/

The Frankfurt Investment Arbitration Moot Court or Frankfurt Moot is a moot competition co-organised by the Max Planck Institute for European Legal History and Morgan, Lewis & Bockius LLP. The comptetion was founded by arbitration practitioner Sabine Konrad. It is the oldest student competition in the area of investment arbitration, with the first edition of the moot taking place in 2008. Its case studies are based on documented historical events, which participants analyse under modern investment law and contemporary public international law. As the class-leading moot in its field, it is considered one of the grand slam or major moots.

With the exception of larger countries such as India and China, national rounds are not necessarily conducted, but each university may only send one team, unlike the Foreign Direct Investment Moot. Like many other arbitration moots, pre-moots are also conducted by institutions such as the International Chamber of Commerce, the Hong Kong International Arbitration Centre, and the European Court of Arbitration. Written submissions are required in the form of skeletals, but they do not count towards progression in the oral rounds, and there is also no prize for best written submissions. In recent editions, teams participate in three preliminary rounds. The top 8 or 16 teams progress to the knockout stages, and there is a prize for best oralist in the championship final. Each round is typically judged by three arbitrators. The 2020 edition of the moot was cancelled at the last moment due to the COVID-19 pandemic. As travel restrictions continued to remain in place, the 2021 and 2022 editions adopted the virtual format; in-person rounds resumed thereafter.

== Competition records ==
Year	Total number of teams	Champion (win number)	1st runner-up (win number)	2nd runners-up	Best Advocate (win number)	Best Non-OECD Team (win number)
2027						
2026	32	University of Cambridge (1)	LMU Munich (2)	* University of Vienna * University of Chicago	University of Cambridge (1)	
2025	80	Singapore Management University (3)	National Law University, Jodhpur (2)	* BPP Law School * University of Chicago	Singapore Management University (2)	
2024	46	Galatasaray University (1)	National Law University, Jodhpur (1)	* *		
2023	66	Symbiosis Law School, Pune (1)	LMU Munich (1)	* NALSAR University of Law * National University of Singapore	LMU Munich (1)	
2022	105 (online)	Singapore Management University (2)	Modern International Law Studies (1)	* City, University of London * Sciences Po	Modern International Law Studies (1)	
2021	42 (online)	National University of Singapore (2)	Government Law College, Mumbai (1)	* National University of Study and Research in Law * Amsterdam University	NA	NA
2019	64	Moscow State Institute of International Relations (1)	University of Vienna (1)	* Singapore Management University * University of Latvia	Moscow State Institute of International Relations (1)	Moscow State Institute of International Relations (1)
2018	47	National University of Singapore (1)	University of Ljubljana (1)	* University of Buenos Aires * University of Novi Sad	University of Ljubljana (1)	National University of Singapore (2)
2017	66	Singapore Management University (1)	Gujarat National Law University (1)	* George Washington University * Lomonosov State University	Singapore Management University (1)	* Gujarat National Law University (1) * Singapore Management University (1)
2016	63	Bucerius Law School (1)	National University of Singapore (1)	* Aristotle University * Jindal Global Law School	Bucerius Law School (1)	* National University of Singapore (1)
2015	36	Jindal Global Law School (1)	Singapore Management University (1)	* National Law University, Delhi * National University of Singapore	Jindal Global Law School (1)	* Jindal Global Law School (1)
2014	30	* University of Miami School of Law (2) * Sciences Po (1)		* George Washington University * Norman Manley Law School	Sciences Po (1)	* Norman Manley Law School (3)
2013	34	Stockholm University (1)	Peking University (1)	* American University * Gujarat National Law University	Stockholm University (2)	Peking University (1)
2012	32	Norman Manley Law School (1)	University of Versailles (1)	* *	Stockholm University (1)	Norman Manley Law School (2)
2011	26	University of Miami School of Law (1)	Graduate Institute of International and Development Studies (1)	* *	Norman Manley Law School (1)	Norman Manley Law School (1)
2010	21	Georgetown Law School (1)	George Washington University (1)	* *	Georgetown Law School (1)	Universidad San Francisco de Quito (1)
2009	27	La Trobe University (1)	City University of Hong Kong (1)	* *	La Trobe University (1)	City University of Hong Kong (1)
2008		Martin Luther University of Halle-Wittenberg (1)	St Gallen University (1)		St Gallen University (1)	NA
