= Usha Tandon =

Indian academic and legal scholar (born 1961)

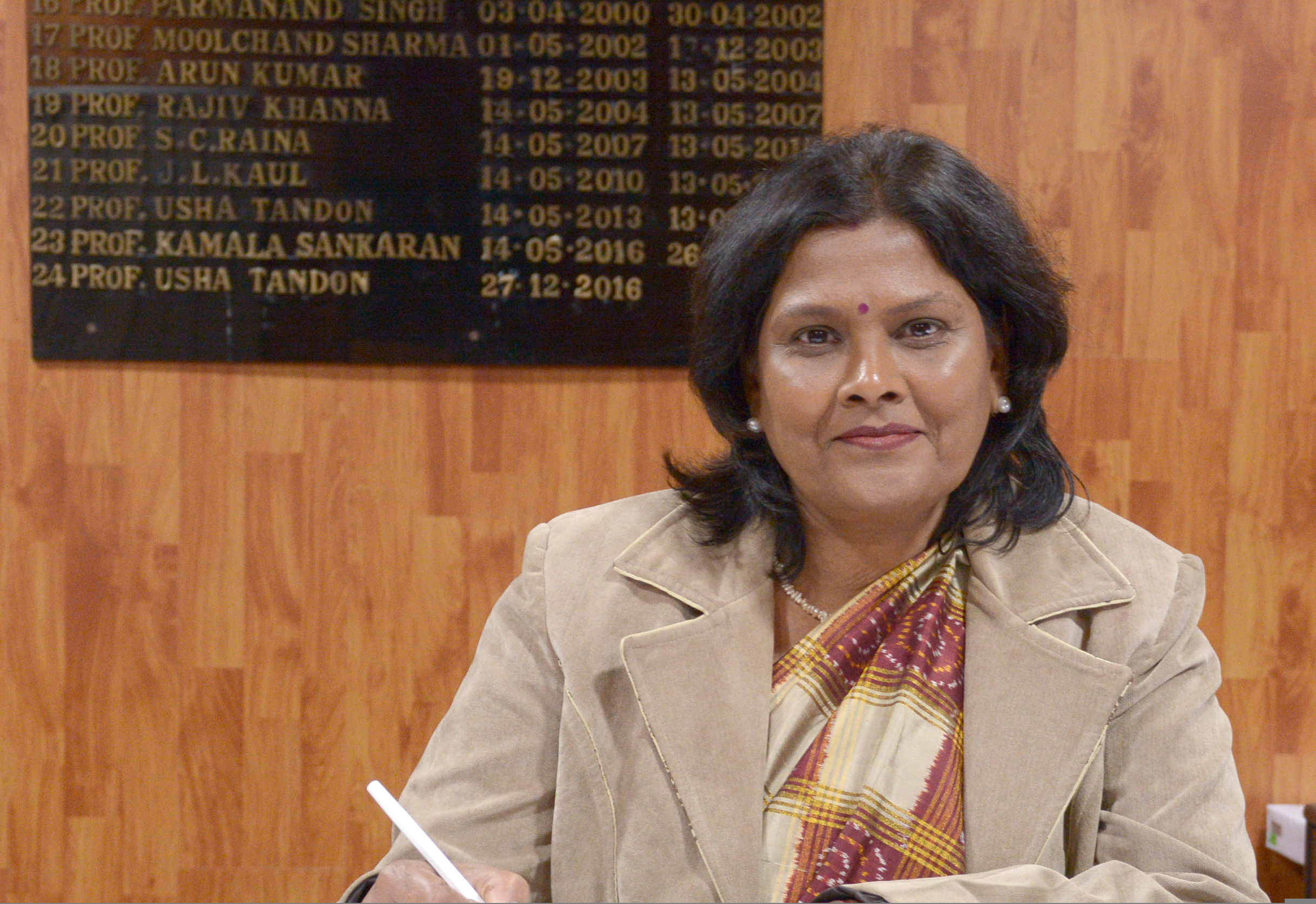
- Born: 1961 (age 64–65)
- Title: Vice Chancellor of Dr. Rajendra Prasad National Law University
- Term: 2023-present

Academic background
- Education: University of Delhi
- Thesis: Population Law (2000)

Academic work
- Institutions: University of Delhi, Guru Gobind Singh Indraprastha University

Usha Tandon (born 1961) is an Indian academic and legal scholar currently serving as the Vice Chancellor of Dr. Rajendra Prasad National Law University, Prayagraj, Uttar Pradesh. She has worked and published in the fields of environmental law, population law, family law, and gender justice.

== Education ==
Tandon completed her LL.B. from Campus Law Centre, University of Delhi in 1985. She obtained her LL.M. from the Faculty of Law, University of Delhi in 1988, specializing in civil liberties, administrative law, and company law. In 2000, she earned her Ph.D. from the Faculty of Law, University of Delhi, with a thesis on population law.

== Career and research ==
Tandon began her academic career at the University of Delhi, where she held various positions:

- Lecturer (ad hoc) at Law Centre-II (1990-1991)
- Lecturer (ad hoc) at Campus Law Centre (1991-1992)
- Lecturer (temporary) at Campus Law Centre (1992-2000)
- Reader at Campus Law Centre (2000-2006)
- Associate Professor at Campus Law Centre (2006-2008)
- Professor at Campus Law Centre (2008–present)

From 2004 to 2005, Tandon served as Professor and Director (on deputation) at Vivekananda Law School, Guru Gobind Singh Indraprastha University, Delhi.

At the University of Delhi, she held the following administrative positions:

- Professor-in-Charge of the Campus Law Centre from May 2013 to May 2016 and December 2016 to December 2019
- Dean and Head of the Faculty of Law from 2021 to 2023

In 2023, Tandon was appointed as the first Vice Chancellor of Dr. Rajendra Prasad National Law University, Prayagraj.

Tandon's research interests include environmental law, clinical legal education, human rights and women, family law, and population law.

== Selected works ==
=== Books ===
- Energy Law and Policy (ed.), Oxford University Press, 2018, ISBN 9780199482979
- Biodiversity: Law, Policy and Governance (ed.), Routledge, Taylor & Francis Group, 2018, ISBN 1138288195
- Human Rights and Trafficking of Women and Children: Legal & Policy Framework (ed.), Central Law Publications, 2016
- Climate Change: Law, Policy and Governance (ed.), Eastern Book Company, 2016
- Gender Justice: A Reality or Fragile Myth (ed.), Regal Publications, 2015
- Population Law: An Instrument for Population Stabilization, Deep & Deep Publications, 2003, ISBN 8176294209

=== Journal articles ===
Tandon has published numerous articles in peer-reviewed journals on topics such as environmental law, gender justice, human trafficking, and climate change law.

== Awards and fellowships ==
Tandon has received several awards and fellowships:

- World Population Day Award, 2001
- Max Planck Fellowship, Germany, 2011
- IIDH Fellowship, France, 2007
- Phenomenal She, 2019

== Professional memberships ==
Prof. Tandon is a member of several professional organizations, including:

- Population Association of America
- South Asian Law Schools Forum for Human Rights (founder member)
- Indian Law Institute
- All India Law Teachers Congress (founder member)
- Institute for Constitutional and Parliamentary Studies
