= International Criminal Court Moot =

Annual moot court competition

International Criminal Court Moot Court Competition
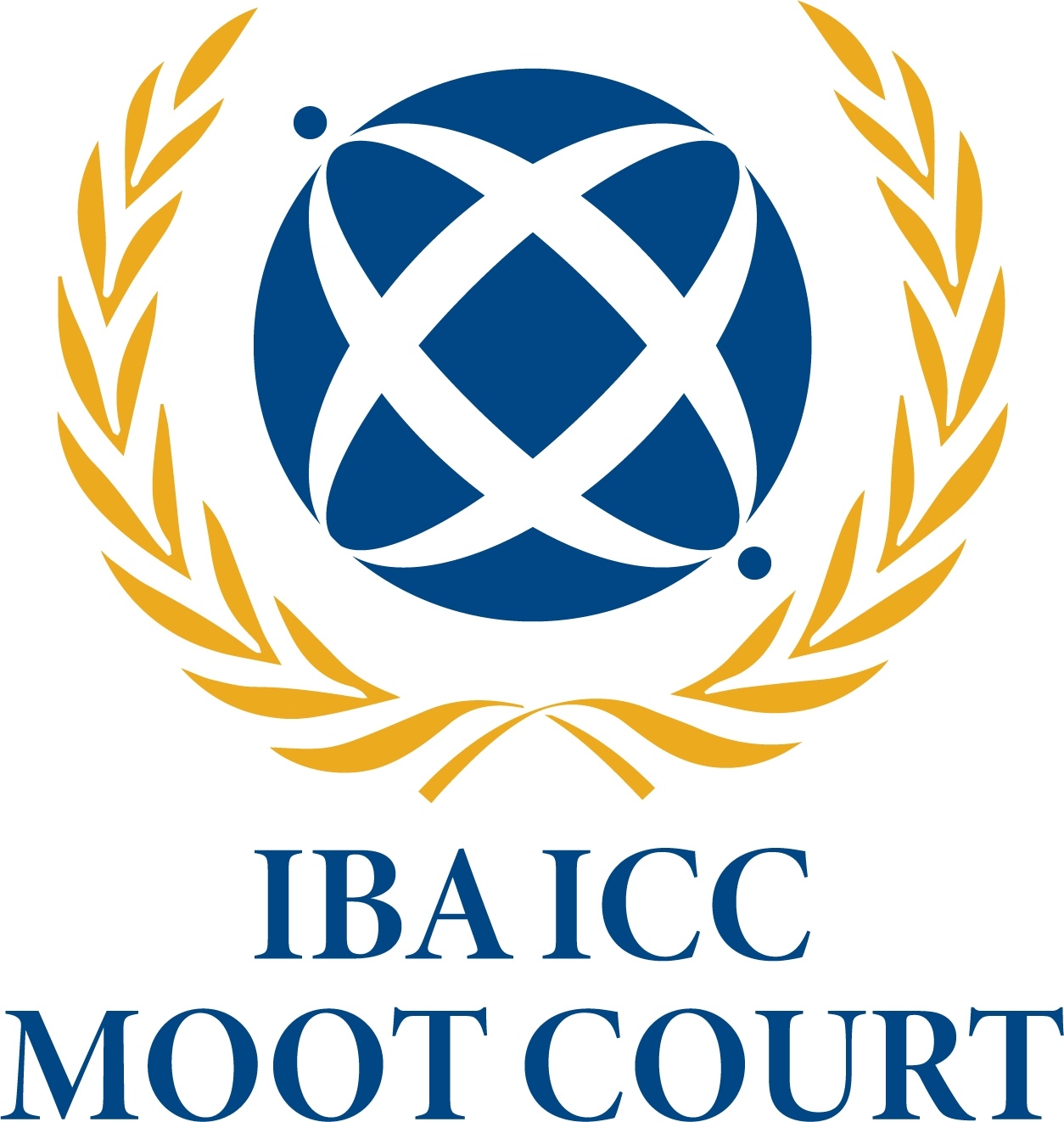
- Established: 2005 (2007 for international rounds)
- Venue: The Hague
- Subject matter: International criminal law
- Class: Grand Slam
- Record participation: 114 teams (2024)
- Qualification: National/regional rounds
- Most championships: Singapore Management University School of Law (6; 1 online)
- Website: http://www.iccmoot.com

The International Criminal Court Moot Court Competition or ICCMCC is an annual international moot court competition on international criminal law that is held at The Hague and organised by the Grotius Centre for International Legal Studies of Leiden University, The Hague Campus, with the institutional support of the International Criminal Court and International Bar Association. Pace Law School had conceived of the moot as an in-class exercise in 2004, and it was in 2005 that a domestic competition was started. The competition became international the following year, with the finals being held in 2007. With more than 100 teams from 50 countries taking part annually, the ICCMCC is the world's largest competition on international criminal law and is considered one of the grand slam or major moots. The competition has been held in various languages thus far; in addition to English, there are also separate Chinese, Spanish, French, and Russian editions of the competition. Singapore Management University, which debuted in 2015, has the best track record in the competition, having reached the international championship final eight times and winning it six times.

Judges of the competition include ICC judges and officers, and teams have to present arguments based on a fictitious problem via the roles of prosecution counsel, defence counsel, government counsel, or victim's representative. The arguments made usually relate to pre-trial or appeal proceedings. Each team is given 20 minutes for the main submissions and 10 minutes for rebuttal/surebuttal. For the English edition of the moot, each country can only send a limited number of teams to participate; depending on the rules for the year, regional or national rounds may be organised to select the teams that will compete in the international rounds. To date, such rounds have been held for the Americas and Caribbean, Brazil, China, Georgia, Germany, India, Iran, Israel, and the Netherlands. For the international rounds, in 2013, semi-final rounds were introduced for the top nine teams, with the top three teams proceeding to the championship final. In 2015, the number of preliminary rounds were increased from three to six, and in 2016 quarter-final rounds were introduced for the top 27 teams. In 2020, the oral rounds were cancelled due to COVID-19, and in 2021 and 2022, the competition adopted an online format. Since 2022, seeding and choice of side have been randomised.

== Competition records (English rounds) ==
Year	Total number of teams (international rounds)	Champion (win number)	Finalists (win number)	Best Speaker (win number)	Best Speaker in Prelims (win number)	Best Memorial (win number)	Best Prosecution Team (win number)	Best Defence Team (win number)	Best Government Counsel Team (win number)	Best Victim's Representative Team (win number)	Best Regional Team (win number)	Best Newcomer
2026	120 (94)	Bond University (3)	* National Law School of India University (1) * Singapore Management University (1)	National Law School of India University (1)	* P: * *	* Overall: Hidayatullah National Law University (1)	Singapore Management University (2)		Singapore Management University (3)	NA	* Africa: * Americas & Oceania: * Asia: Singapore Management University (5) * Europe:	
2025	(88)	Singapore Management University (6)	*Ateneo de Manila University (1) * University of Bonn (1)								*Africa: University of Ghana (1) * Americas & Oceania: Monash University (1) * Asia: Singapore Management University (4) * Europe: University of Bonn (2)	
2024	114 (88)	Singapore Management University (5)	* Strathmore University (1) * University of the Philippines (1)	Strathmore University (1)	* P: King's Inns (1) * D: National University of Singapore (1) * V: University of the Philippines (1) * Overall: National University of Singapore (1)	* P: Maastricht University (1) * D: University of St Gallen (1) * V: Singapore Management University (1) * Overall: Maastricht University (1)	Maastricht University (1)	West Bengal National University of Juridical Sciences (1)	NA	University of the Philippines (2)	* Africa: Strathmore University (1) * Americas & Oceania: University of Miami (2) * Asia: Singapore Management University (3) * Europe: Maastricht University (1)	University of Milan
2023	81	Universidade Federal da Bahia (1)	* Maastricht University (1) * Université libre de Bruxelles (1)	Maastricht University (1)	* P: National University of Singapore (1); D: National Law University, Jodhpur * G: University of the Philippines (1) * Overall: University of the Philippines (2)	* P: Universitas Prasetiya Mulya (1) * D: University of Bonn (2) * G: National University of Kyiv-Mohyla Academy (1); Overall: National University of Kyiv-Mohyla Academy (1)	National University of Singapore (1)	Jindal Global Law School (1)	Singapore Management University (2)	NA	* Africa: Moi University (1) * Americas & Oceania: Universidade Federal da Bahia (1) * Asia: National Law University, Jodhpur (1) * Europe: Leiden University (2)	Stockholm University
2022 (online)	76	King's Inns (1)	* China University of Political Science and Law (1) * Emory University (1)	King's Inns (1)	* P: Georgetown University (1) * D: University of Miami (1) * V: Temple University (1) * Overall: University of Miami (1)	* P: Singapore Management University (2) * D: University of Bonn (1) * V: University of Bonn (1) * Overall: University of Bonn (1)	Universitas Gadjah Mada (1)	University of Miami (1)	NA	King's Inns (1)	* Africa: Makerere University * Americas & Oceania: University of Miami (1) * Asia: Singapore Management University (2); Europe: University of Bonn (1)	University of Auckland
2021 (online)	95	Singapore Management University (4)	* National University of Singapore (1) * Osgoode Hall Law School (4)	Singapore Management University (2)	* P: Gujarat National Law University (1) * D: Queensland University of Technology * G: Osgoode Hall Law School (1) (1) * Overall: Gujarat National Law University (1)	* P: Singapore Management University (1) * D: University of Ljubljana * G: Singapore Management University (1) * Overall: Singapore Management University (1)	Singapore Management University (1)	Singapore Management University (1)	Singapore Management University (1)	NA	* Africa: University of Makeni (1) * Americas & Oceania: Osgoode Hall Law School (1) * Asia: Singapore Management University (1) * Europe: Leiden University (1)	University of Ljubljana
2020 – cancelled due to COVID-19	100+ (71)	NA	NA	NA	NA	NA	NA	NA	NA	NA	NA	NA
2019	100+ (69)	Leiden University (3)	* King's Inns (1) and Chinese University of Hong Kong (1)	Leiden University (1)	Chinese University of Hong Kong (1)	* P: Escola de Direito de São Paulo (1) * D: National Law University Delhi (2) * G: University of New South Wales (1)	Chinese University of Hong Kong (3)	* Universitas Gadjah Mada (1) * National Law University, Delhi (2)	University of Ottawa (1)	NA	NA	Kuwait International Law School
2018	100+ (60+)	Singapore Management University (3)	* West Bengal National University of Juridical Sciences (1); *Honorable Society of the King's Inns (1)	West Bengal National University of Juridical Sciences (1)	University of Ottawa (1)	* P: Chinese University of Hong Kong (1) * D: Gujarat National Law University (1) * V: University of Macau (2)	Chinese University of Hong Kong (2)	Gujarat National Law University (1)	NA	University of the Philippines (1)	NA	NA
2017	100+ (65)	Leiden University (2)	* Singapore Management University (1) * Queensland University of Technology (1)		University of the Philippines (1)					University of Aberdeen (1)	NA	NA
2016	112 (60)	Singapore Management University (2)	* University of Cologne (1) * National Law School of India University (1)	University of Cologne (1)		University of New South Wales (2)			National Law School of India University (1)	National University of Singapore	NA	NA
2015	100+ (57)	Singapore Management University (1)	* Leiden University (1) * National Law University, Jodhpur (1)	Singapore Management University (1)		University of Macau (1)	Chinese University of Hong Kong (1)	NA	Bond University (1)	Singapore Management University (1)	NA	NA
2014	80+ (49)	National Law University, Delhi (1)	* Hebrew University (1) * China Foreign Affairs University (1)		University of New South Wales (1)	National Law University, Delhi (1)					NA	NA
2013	50+ (37)	Leiden University (1)	* Osgoode Hall Law School (1) * Bond University (1)	Osgoode Hall Law School (1)		University of New South Wales (1)	Aristotle University of Thessaloniki (1)		NA		NA	NA
2012	40+ (26)	City University of Hong Kong (1)	* Kaplan Law School (1) * Osgoode Hall Law School (3)	City University of Hong Kong (1)						NA	NA	NA
2011	21	Bond University (2)	* Nalsar University of Law (2) * Osgoode Hall Law School (2)	Nalsar University of Law (1)		National Law School of India University (1)	Bond University (1)		NA		NA	NA
2010	18	Osgoode Hall Law School (1)	* University of Miami (1) * Yale University (1)		Bond University (1)	Osgoode Hall Law School (1)	Osgoode Hall Law School (2)		NA	National Law University, Jodhpur (1)	NA	NA
2009	20	Bond University (1)	* Yale University (1) * Utrecht University (1)	Bond University (1)		Yale University (1)	Yale University (1)	Yale University (1)	NA	Bond University (1)	NA	NA
2008	NA	NA	NA	NA	NA	NA	NA	NA	NA	NA	NA	NA
2007	12	University of Pretoria (1)	* Nalsar University of Law (1) * Osgoode Hall Law School (1)		Amsterdam University (1)		Osgoode Hall Law School (1)	Nalsar University of Law (1)	NA	NA	NA	NA
