= Goh Yihan =

Singaporean judge and legal academic (born 1981)

The Honourable Justice Goh Yihan SC
- 吴亦涵
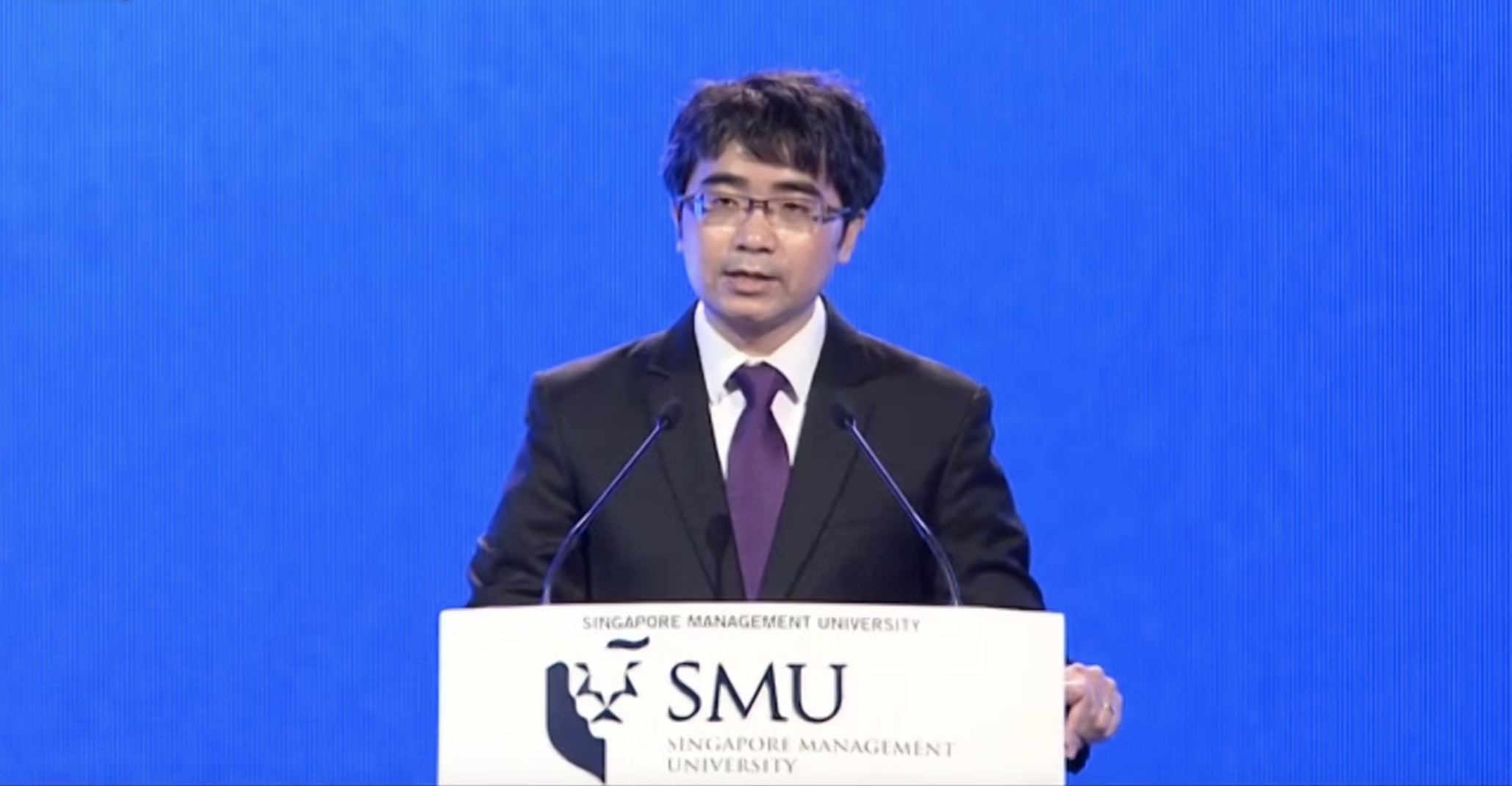
- Goh in 2021

Judge of the Appellate Division of the High Court of Singapore
- Incumbent
- Assumed office 1 October 2026
- Appointed by: Tharman Shanmugaratnam

Deputy Attorney-General of Singapore
- In office 1 January 2025 – 30 September 2026 Serving with Lionel Yee; Tai Wei Shyong; Ang Cheng Hock; Valerie Thean
- Appointed by: Tharman Shanmugaratnam

Judge of the High Court of Singapore
- In office 1 October 2023 – 31 December 2024
- Appointed by: Halimah Yacob

Judicial Commissioner of Singapore
- In office 1 July 2022 – 30 September 2023
- Appointed by: Halimah Yacob

Personal details
- Born: 1981 (age 44–45)
- Education: National University of Singapore Faculty of Law (LLB); Harvard Law School (LLM)

Goh Yihan
- Simplified Chinese: 吴亦涵
Transcriptions
Standard Mandarin
- Hanyu Pinyin: Wú Yìhán

Goh Yihan (born 1981) is a Singaporean judge who is serving as a Judge of the Appellate Division of the High Court of Singapore since 1 October 2026. He previously served as a Deputy Attorney-General of Singapore from January 2025 to September 2026, and before that as a Judge and a Judicial Commissioner of the Supreme Court of Singapore. Prior to joining the judiciary, Goh was a legal academic at the National University of Singapore and Singapore Management University, serving as Dean of the Yong Pung How School of Law from 2017 to 2022.

== Education ==
Goh graduated from the National University of Singapore Faculty of Law with a first class honours LLB in 2006 as the valedictorian. He also topped his second-year examinations and was on the NUS Undergraduate Scholarship. At the 2004 B. A. Mallal Moot, he won both the best oralist and best memorial prizes.

Goh obtained his LLM from Harvard Law School in 2010. He had received the NUS University Overseas Scholarship in 2009 to pursue his postgraduate studies.

== Career ==
Goh was called to the Singapore Bar in 2011. He had received the Order of Merit in the 2006 bar examinations. In 2013, he became the youngest recipient of the Singapore Academy of Law's Singapore Law Merit Award.

=== Academic career ===
Goh returned to the National University of Singapore Faculty of Law in 2008, where he was a Teaching Assistant until 2010. He was then appointed an Assistant Professor, a position he held from 2011 to 2014.

Goh left NUS Law in June 2014. He received four university and faculty teaching awards during his time at NUS.

Goh became an Associate Professor of Law at the Singapore Management University School of Law in July 2014 and was appointed Associate Dean (Research) in January 2016. He received two faculty teaching awards during his first two years at SMU.

In July 2017, Goh became Dean of SMU Law, succeeding Yeo Tiong Min. He was appointed following what the university described as an extensive global search. At the age of 35, he was the youngest person to become Dean of the school. In July 2019, he was appointed a full Professor of Law at SMU.

In 2018, while serving as Dean, Goh gave evidence before the Parliamentary Select Committee on Deliberate Online Falsehoods. He argued that existing Singapore laws had limitations in dealing with online falsehoods, including in relation to the speed and scope of available remedies.

=== Legal and judicial career ===
After obtaining his LLB, Goh served as a Justices' Law Clerk in the Supreme Court from 2006 to 2008. He later became a Senior Justices' Law Clerk and served as an Assistant Registrar of the Supreme Court.

Goh served as amicus curiae to the Court of Appeal on numerous occasions. The court described his written and oral submissions in one case as "comprehensive, elegantly expressed, and lucidly organised", and in another described his submissions as "models of clarity and conciseness".

Goh was appointed Senior Counsel in January 2021.

On 1 July 2022, Goh was appointed a Judicial Commissioner of the Supreme Court for a two-year term.

On 1 October 2023, Goh was appointed a Judge of the High Court. His areas of focus included finance, securities and banking, complex commercial cases, corporate insolvency, company and trusts law, intellectual property and information technology, and tort claims.

On 4 November 2024, it was announced that Goh would resign as a Judge and be appointed a Deputy Attorney-General with effect from 1 January 2025. He served as Deputy Attorney-General from 1 January 2025 to 30 September 2026. At the Attorney-General's Chambers, he oversaw the Civil Division and Advocacy Group, as well as the International Legal Cooperation Team within the Crime Division.

During his tenure as Deputy Attorney-General, Goh appeared for the Attorney-General in Jumaat bin Mohamed Sayed and others v Attorney-General [2025] SGCA 40, in which four prisoners challenged the constitutionality of statutory presumptions under the Misuse of Drugs Act. A five-judge Court of Appeal rejected the constitutional challenges and upheld the operation of the presumptions.

Goh also led the prosecution in Pritam Singh's appeal against his convictions for giving false answers to the Parliamentary Committee of Privileges. The appeal was heard in November 2025 before Justice Steven Chong, and the General Division of the High Court dismissed the appeal on 4 December 2025, upholding both convictions.

On 25 September 2026, it was announced that the President had appointed Goh a Judge of the Appellate Division of the High Court with effect from 1 October 2026. He returned to the Supreme Court Bench on that date, following the conclusion of his tenure as Deputy Attorney-General on 30 September 2026.

=== Professional appointments and awards ===
Goh is Chair of the Singapore Academy of Law Publications Committee and Co-Chair of its Learning and Professional Development Committee. He is also a Vice-Chairperson of the Singapore Institute of Legal Education Board.

== Selected works ==
- Andrew B. L. Phang and Goh Yihan, Contract Law in Singapore (Alphen aan den Rijn: Wolters Kluwer Law and Business, 2012; 2nd ed, 2021; 3rd ed, 2026)
- Goh Yihan, Singapore Chronicles: Law (Singapore: Institute of Policy Studies-Straits Times Press, 2015)
- Alvin See, Yip Man and Goh Yihan, Property and Trust Law in Singapore (Alphen aan den Rijn: Wolters Kluwer Law and Business, 2018)
- Goh Yihan, The Interpretation of Contracts in Singapore (Singapore: Thomson Reuters, 2018)
- Goh Yihan, Pursuing Justice and Justice Alone: The Heart and Humanity of Andrew Phang's Jurisprudence (Singapore Academy of Law, 2022)
