= Dr. Rajendra Prasad National Law University =

Public university in India (2024)

- Type: National Law University
- Established: 2024 (2 years ago)
- Affiliations: UGC, BCI
- Chairperson: Chief Minister of Uttar Pradesh
- Chancellor: Chief Justice of Allahabad High Court
- Vice-Chancellor: Dr. Usha Tandon
- Visitor: Justice Manoj Misra
- Location: Prayagraj, Uttar Pradesh, India; 25.5264°N 81.8480°E
- Campus: Residential
- Website: www.rpnlup.ac.in

Dr. Rajendra Prasad National Law University, also known as RPNLU or NLU Prayagraj or NLU Allahabad, is a public law school and a National Law University located in Prayagraj, Uttar Pradesh, India. It is second National Law University established in the state of Uttar Pradesh after Lucknow's Dr. Ram Manohar Lohiya National Law University.

== See also ==
- Legal education in India
- List of law schools in India
