= European Law Moot Court =

The European Law Moot Court Society

The European Law Moot Court (ELMC) is an annual moot court competition between rival teams of university students who have an interest in European Union law.

The competition consists of a written round, regional finals, and a Europe-wide final. During the written round the teams of three or four students write two legal pleadings (one each for the applicant and respondent). From these written pleadings the teams are scored and the 48 highest scoring teams proceed to one of the four regional finals across the globe for oral hearings. One team from each regional final goes on to the all-European final where the four regional final winning teams argue before the judges of the European Court of Justice in Luxembourg.

In addition, one member from each team at the regional finals can participate in the competition as the representative of the European Commission or Advocate-General of the European Court of Justice and is eligible to receive a separate award for his or her effort at the all-European finals. There is also a special award for the best oral speaker and the best written pleadings.

The motto of the competition is "moot, meet and compete".

== Participants ==
In the 2004/2005 competition, the regional finals were held in:

- Madrid, Spain
- Gothenburg, Sweden
- Istanbul, Turkey
- New York City, United States

In the 2005/2006 competition, the regional finals were held in:

- Boston, United States
- Dublin, Ireland
- Ljubljana, Slovenia
- Bratislava, Slovakia

In the 2006/2007 competition, the regional finals were held in:

- Maastricht, the Netherlands
- Zagreb, Croatia
- Pécs, Hungary
- Kyiv, Ukraine

In the 2007/2008 competition, the regional finals were held in:

- Dallas, United States
- Maribor, Slovenia
- Valencia, Spain
- Bangor, United Kingdom

In the 2010/2011 competition, the regional finals were held in:

- Heidelberg, Germany
- Zagreb, Croatia
- Barcelona, Spain
- Dublin, Ireland

In the 2011/2012 competition, the regional finals are held in:

- Luxembourg City, Luxembourg
- Braga, Portugal
- Lucerne, Switzerland
- Istanbul, Turkey
