= Lee Pey Woan =

Singaporean legal academic

Lee Pey Woan PPA PK is a Singaporean legal academic who is dean at the Singapore Management University School of Law.

== Education ==
Lee graduated with a Bachelor of Laws with first-class honours from King's College London and subsequently obtained a Bachelor of Civil Law from Oxford University.

== Career ==
Lee started work as a Legal Manager at Keppel Corporation.

=== Academic career ===
Lee joined the faculty at the Singapore Management University School of Law in 2000, which was at that point of time still a law department under the Lee Kong Chian School of Business. She was subsequently appointed an associate professor of law in 2008, and a professor of law in 2019.

Over the years, Lee has held numerous leadership positions in the Singapore Management University School of Law. In 2010, Lee was appointed Associate Dean (Teaching and Curriculum) and she was subsequently appointed Associate Dean (Undergraduate Teaching & Curriculum) in 2017, before then becoming the vice-provost of faculty matters. She is currently Dean and professor at the Singapore Management University School of Law, where she serves a 5-year term as the dean of the school with effect from July 2022. She was selected as dean following "an extensive and rigorous global search that started in August 2021". Lee has stated at the start of her appointment that her aim is to have the school be amongst the top 50 law schools in the world and top 5 in Asia within the next five to ten years. During her tenure as Dean, the law school launched a specialisation track intended to better prepare students for the working world and also a capstone course that trains students to work across traditional boundaries and discrete areas of law by applying a practical lens.

In May 2025, Lee co-wrote an article in May 2025 in the Straits Times discussing the issue of attrition in the legal profession.

== Recognition ==
Lee is an accomplished scholar whose research interests involve company, private and commercial law. Her work has been cited extensively by various courts.

Lee was also appointed amicus curiae in 2017 by a 5-member coram of the Court of Appeal in the case of PH Hydraulics & Engineering v Airtrust (Hong Kong) Ltd [2017] 2 SLR 129;[2017] SGCA 26, in which the Court, in its Grounds of Decision, expressed "deep appreciation to Prof Lee for her outstanding scholarship as well as cogent oral submissions that aided [it] greatly in arriving at its decision on a particularly thorny area of the common law of contract."

== Awards ==
Lee has received the Commendation Medal in 2010 and Public Administration Medal (Silver) in 2021.
