= Jean-Pictet Competition =

International moot court competition

Jean-Pictet International Humanitarian Law Competition
- Established: 1988 (1989 for international rounds)
- Venue: Various
- Qualification: International written rounds
- Most Championships: University of New South Wales (6)
- Website: https://www.concourspictet.org/index.php

The Jean-Pictet Competition, also known as the Concours Pictet, is an international moot court competition on international humanitarian law. It has been organised by the independent Comité pour le Concours Jean-Pictet (in partnership with the International Committee of the Red Cross) since 1989, and is widely considered the most prestigious humanitarian law moot worldwide. Recent editions have attracted over 250 universities from more than 100 countries, with around 100 teams participating annually.

== Moot Format and Origins ==
The Competition started as a local moot organised in France by Michel Deyra of the University of Clermont-Ferrand in 1988 before opening its international doors in 1989. Since then, it has been hosted in a variety of countries, including Switzerland, Serbia, Indonesia, the United States, and South Africa. It is named after Jean Pictet, a Swiss jurist and international humanitarian law advocate who contributed to the drafting of the Geneva Conventions.

The Competition styles itself as "taking the law out of the books". Participants are assessed on their ability to use the law in strategic scenarios, including their knowledge of the substantive law, their teamwork and collaboration, and how well they represent the actors they are assigned to. Through multiple mini-competitions across a week, which might include traditional moot courts, negotiations, or real-time simulations, teams are selected to advance to the semi-finals, and then finals. All participants are known as "Picteists", and join a Directory of Picteists for Competition alumni.

Commentators have described the Competition to be different from other grand slam moots in being more varied in the participants' usage of the law; compared to the Jessup, which only applies the law in the courtroom in an appellate format, the Jean-Pictet Competition requires participants to play different roles, such as ICRC delegates and treaty negotiators, and has been praised as being able to benefit them not just professionally but personally.

Teams first submit a set of long-form written essays on their application to the Competition, which then selects roughly 50 teams for each edition. The preliminary rounds begin after the teams travel to the hosting country and lasts a week. The semi-finals and finals happen on the same day. Teams which have won regional international humanitarian law competitions, such as the Hong Kong Red Cross IHL Moot, are eligible to skip the essay selection stage.

== Competition records ==
The Jean-Pictet Prize is awarded to the overall winning team of the competition each edition, while the Gilbert-Apollis Prize is awarded to the best speaker(s) in the preliminary rounds. Starting from 2019, the competition began hosting multiple editions per year. The 2026 editions of the competition will be held in (i) Dilidjan, Armenia, (ii) Batam, Indonesia, and (iii) Singapore.

The University of New South Wales holds the most competition wins at 6, followed by the Free University of Brussels at 5 wins.
