= English-Speaking Union Moot =

The English-Speaking Union Moot, also known as, by virtue of a sponsorship arrangement with Essex Court Chambers, the ESU-Essex Court Chambers National Mooting Competition, or simply the ESU Moot, is the longest-running national mooting competition in the UK, involving teams of law students from universities across the country. The first grand final was held in 1972. The competition is run by Oxford Brookes University under the chairmanship of Dr Eric Baskind, a visiting research fellow at the university. The president of the competition is The Right Hon. Lady Arden of Heswall DBE, Justice of the UK Supreme Court.

== History ==
In addition to being the oldest mooting competition, the ESU moot is also the largest of its kind, accepting entries from universities across the legal jurisdictions of the UK. Originally, the ESU moot was known as the Observer Moot, and has been known by its current name since 2000. Legal Week currently acts as the competition's media partner.

== Format ==
The competition takes a knockout format, with 6 rounds, the last two of which take place on the same day. While the number of rounds require 64 participants, there is facility for more competitors than this, with special arrangements made to have pre-competition rounds to whittle the competitors down to 64.

Each round must be completed by a particular preset deadline, with one team being designated the host, and is thus responsible for securing a judge and organising facilities for the moot. All finalists and semi-finalists are presented with monetary prizes. In addition, the winners are awarded the Silver Mace, and the runner's up the Scarman Shield.

== Previous winners ==
Year	Winner
2024	University of Greenwich
2023	University of Southampton
2022	Oxford Brookes University
2021	King's College London
2020	Queen Mary University of London
2019	Oxford Brookes University
2018	University of Salford
2017	Newcastle University
2016	Oxford Brookes University
2015	Oxford Brookes University
2014	Liverpool John Moores University
2013	University College London
2012	Oxford Brookes University
2011	University of Glasgow
2010	University of Oxford
2009	University of Manchester
2008	University of Hertfordshire
2007	Liverpool John Moores University
2006	Queen Mary, University of London
2005	City University, London
2004	University of Bristol
2003	University of Liverpool
2002	University of Southampton
2001	Middlesex University
2000	Kingston University
1999	University of Greenwich
1998	University of Aberdeen
1997	University of Cambridge
1996	University of Bristol
1995	University of Leicester
1994	University of Edinburgh
1993	King's College London
1992	University of Birmingham
1991	University of East Anglia
1990	Nottingham Trent Polytechnic
1989	King's College London
1988	University of East Anglia
1987	Essex Institute of Higher Education
1986	Polytechnic of Central London
1985	University of Lancaster
1984	University of Bristol
1983	University of Hull
1982	Polytechnic of Central London
1981	Queen Mary College
1980	Queen Mary College
1979	School of Oriental and African Studies
1978	Queen Mary College
1977	University of Leicester
1976	University of Leicester
1975	Mid Essex Technical College
1974	University of Leicester
1973	University of Leicester
1972	University College London
