= Nuremberg Moot =

Nuremberg Moot Court
- Established: 2013
- Venue: Nuremberg
- Subject matter: International criminal law
- Class: International
- Record participation: 131 teams (2024)
- Qualification: Written submissions
- Most championships: Maastricht University
- Website: https://www.nuremberg-moot.de/home/

The Nuremberg Moot Court is an international moot court competition. Held at the Nuremberg Palace of Justice and organised by the International Nuremberg Principles Academy and University of Erlangen-Nuremberg, this competition now attracts around 100 to 200 teams from around the world annually, though not all are selected to participate in the oral rounds in Nuremberg. Participants make submissions as though they are before the International Criminal Court. For the 2020 edition, owing to travel restrictions brought about by Covid-19, the tournament winner was adjudged by memorials only. Oral rounds were reinstated for 2021, but remained online until 2022.

Year	Total number of teams	Champion	1st runner-up	Best Oralist	Best Memorials
2013	5	Maastricht University	National University of Kyiv-Mohyla Academy	-	-
2014	10	Maastricht University	National University of Kyiv-Mohyla Academy	-	-
2015	18	Maastricht University	National University of Kyiv-Mohyla Academy	-	University of São Paulo; National University of Kyiv-Mohyla Academy
2016	26	National University of Singapore	University of São Paulo	National University of Singapore	Maastricht University; Jagiellonian University
2017	37	Strathmore University	National University of Kyiv-Mohyla Academy	National University of Kyiv-Mohyla Academy; Strathmore University	Philipps-University Marburg; Geneva Academy
2018	57	Maastricht University	National University of Kyiv-Mohyla Academy	Creighton University	Peking University; University of Copenhagen
2019	52	National University of Singapore	Birzeit University	La Trobe University; National University of Singapore	Birzeit University; Creighton University; Monash University
2020 (no oral rounds)	63	Maastricht University	London School of Economics	NA	National University of Kyiv-Mohyla Academy; Maastricht University
2021 (online)	46	Queen Mary University of London	Maastricht University	Queen Mary University of London	Tamil Nadu Dr. Ambedkar Law University; West Bengal National University of Juridical Sciences; Fudan University
2022 (online)	45	Maastricht University	Koç University	Maastricht University	Fateh Law Agency; Jagiellonian University
2023	31	Strathmore University	Macquarie University	Macquarie University	Yerevan State University; Singapore Management University
2024	37	Australian National University	National Law Institute University Bhopal	Australian National University; Stockholm University	Maharashtra National Law University Nagpur; Tilburg University; Universiti Malaya
2025	35	Dharmashastra National Law University	Kabarak University	Universidad Carlos III Madrid; Kabarak University	University of Glasgow; NALSAR University of Law; University of Oxford
2026	34	University of Colombo	University of New South Wales	Ivane Javakhishvili Tbilisi State University; University of New South Wales; University of Colombo	Rajiv Gandhi National University of Law; De La Salle University; Rivers State University
