= Yeo Tiong Min =

Yeo Tiong Min SC PBM (杨忠明) is a Singaporean legal academic. He is the Yong Pung How Professor of Law at the Singapore Management University School of Law and served as its dean from 2012 to 2017. In his time as Dean, Yeo was credited for his role in developing the Singapore Management University School of Law "into a leading law school in Singapore and in Asia." Yeo was succeeded as dean in 2017 by Goh Yihan. At the time he stepped down, Yeo was said to have "been instrumental in developing SOL into a leading law school in Singapore and in Asia". Yeo recently published a new book entitled "Commercial Conflict of Laws".

== Education ==
Yeo graduated from the National University of Singapore's Faculty of Law in 1990 and subsequently obtained his Masters' Degree and Doctorate from Oxford University. He was on the faculty of the National University of Singapore's Faculty of Law before being appointed a professor at the Singapore Management University School of Law in 2007.

== Appointments ==
Yeo is Chairman of the Asian Business Law Institute Advisory Board. He is also a Professorial Fellow at the Singapore Institute of Legal Education.

== Awards ==
In 2012, Yeo was appointed as the first-ever Senior Counsel (honoris causa) in Singapore in recognition of his special knowledge in law and his outstanding contribution to the development of the law and to the legal profession. He has received numerous national awards in the course of his academic career, receiving the Public Service Medal in 2014, for his work on the Senate of the Singapore Academy of Law and thereafter, receiving the Public Administration Medal (Silver) in 2017.
