= Moot court =

Extracurricular activity at many law schools

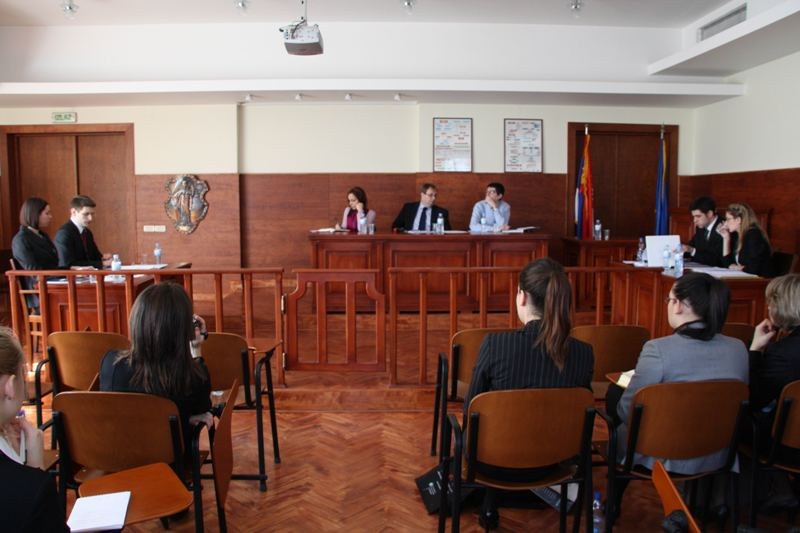
Moot Court at the Belgrade Law School

Moot court is a co-curricular activity at many law schools. Participants take part in simulated court or arbitration proceedings, which usually involve drafting memorials or memoranda and participating in oral argument. In many countries, the phrase "moot court" may be shortened to simply "moot" or "mooting". Participants are either referred to as "mooters" or, less conventionally, "mooties".

== Format and structure ==
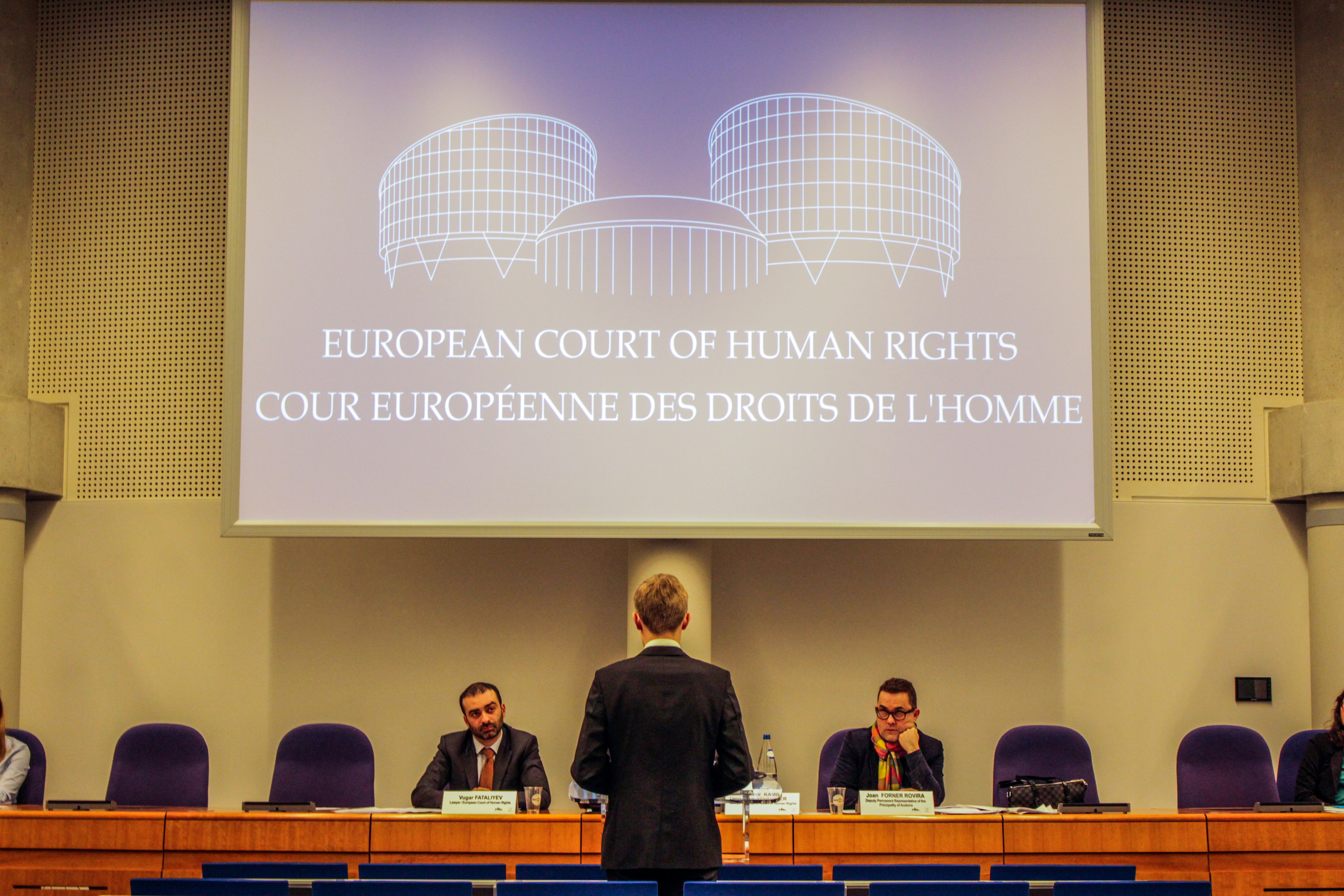
5th European Human Rights Moot championship round, held in the European Court of Human Rights building

Moot court involves simulated proceedings before an appellate court, arbitral tribunal, or international dispute resolution body. These are different from mock trials that involve simulated jury trials or bench trials. Moot court does not involve actual testimony by witnesses, cross-examination, or the presentation of evidence, but is focused solely on the application of the law to a common set of evidentiary assumptions, facts, and clarifications/corrections to which the competitors are introduced. Though not moots in the traditional sense, alternative dispute resolution competitions focusing on mediation and negotiation have also branded themselves as moot competitions in recent times, as had role-playing competitions in the past such as the Jean-Pictet competition.

Moot court, like law review and clinical work, is one of the key extracurricular activities in many law schools around the world. Depending on the competition, students may spend a semester researching and writing the written submissions or memorials, and another semester practicing their oral arguments, or may prepare both within the span of a few weeks. Whereas domestic moot court competitions tend to focus on municipal law such as criminal law or contract law, regional and international moot competitions tend to focus on cross-border subjects such as EU Law, public international law (including its subsets environmental law, space law, and aviation law), international human rights law, international humanitarian law, international criminal law, international trade law, international maritime law, international commercial arbitration, and foreign direct investment arbitration. Ancillary issues pertaining to jurisdiction, standing, choice of law, and remedies are also occasionally engaged, especially in arbitration and international law moots.

In most moot court competitions, there are two sides and each side is represented by two speakers or oralists (though the entire team composition may be larger, and the number of speakers may range from one to four) and a third member, sometimes known as of counsel, may be seated with the speakers. Each speaker usually speaks between 10 and 25 minutes, covering one to three main issues. After the main submissions are completed, there will usually be a short round or two of rebuttal and even surrebuttal. Communications between speakers may or may not be prohibited. Throughout the course of the submissions, judges — usually lawyers, academics, or actual judges — may ask questions, though in some competitions questions are reserved to the end of submissions.

In larger competitions, teams have to participate in up to ten rounds (not including any domestic or regional qualifiers); the knockout/elimination stages are usually preceded by a number of preliminary rounds to determine seeding (power seeding is often used). Teams almost always must switch sides (applicant/appellant/claimant on one side, and respondent on the other) throughout a competition, and, depending on the format of the moot, the moot problem usually remains the same throughout. The scores of the written submissions are taken into consideration for most competitions to determine qualification (whether for the competition or for the knockouts) and seeding, and sometimes even up to a particular knockout stage. Participation in moot court are relevant to some law school rankings.

== International moot court competitions ==
International moot competitions are generally targeted at students (including postgraduates) and only allow participants who have not qualified to practice law in any jurisdiction. However, there are a handful of international moot competitions that are targeted at newly qualified lawyers, such as the ECC-SAL Moot, which is a regional moot started in 2012 and is jointly organised by Essex Court Chambers and the Singapore Academy of Law, and the New South Wales Young Lawyers/CIArb competition.

The table below lists some of the more notable international moot competitions for students. Grand slam international moots refer to class-leading moots or those that attract a substantial number of teams, while smaller or less established and region-only competitions are known as internationals and regionals respectively. Some countries also divide competitions into various tiers of prestige for the purpose of awarding points in league tables, with moots such as the Jessup and Vis competitions being considered as belonging to the highest tier. Most international moots only permit one team per institution; competitions that allow more than one team tend to be smaller in scale, and competitions that allow teams to comprise members from more than one institution are rare. Some competitions also limit the number of teams based on geographical location; for instance, for most countries, the Jessup generally only permits one qualifying institution for every ten law schools.

Due to COVID-19, many moot competitions were either cancelled or moved to an online format for some years. By the 2022/23 season, however, almost all competitions had reverted to the in-person format.

=== List of notable international moot court competitions ===
Competition	Established	Class	Primary subject matter	Record annual participation (year)	Location of international finals	National or regional rounds	Cap on teams from same country or region	Pre-moots	Multiple teams from same institution	Most (international) championships
Philip C Jessup	1960 (1968 for international rounds; no rounds in 2020)	Grand Slam	Public international law	806 teams (2025); Online: 664 teams (2022)	Washington DC	Yes	Yes	No	No	University of Sydney (6; 1 online)
Willem C Vis	1993	Grand Slam	International commercial arbitration	407 teams (2026); Online: 387 teams (2021)	Vienna	Optional pre-moots	No	Yes	No	University of Ottawa (3)
Willem C Vis (East)	2003	Grand Slam	International commercial arbitration	180 teams (2025); Online: 150 teams (2021)	Hong Kong	Optional pre-moots	No	Yes	No	Singapore Management University (3; 1 online)
Price Media Law	2007	Grand Slam	International human rights law	121 teams (2014); Online: 100 teams (2021)	Oxford	Yes	No	No	No	Singapore Management University (4; 1 online)
International Criminal Court	2005 (2007 for international rounds; no rounds in 2020)	Grand Slam	International criminal law	112 teams (2016); Online: 95 teams (2021)	The Hague	Yes	No	No	No	Singapore Management University (6; 1 online)
Frankfurt Investment Arbitration	2007 (no rounds in 2020)	Grand Slam	International investment arbitration	66 teams (2017); Online: 105 teams (2022)	Frankfurt	Yes	No	Yes	No	Singapore Management University (3; 1 online)
Lachs Space Law Moot	1992 (1993 for international rounds)	Grand Slam	Space law	100+ teams (2024)	Varies	Yes	Yes	No	No	National Law School of India University (4)
John Jackson WTO	2002	International	World Trade Organization law	99 teams (2018)	Geneva	Yes	No	No	Yes	University of Melbourne (3)
Fletcher Insolvency	2016	International	International insolvency law	40 teams (2025); Online: 34 teams (2021)	Varies	Qualification by written submissions	No	No	No	Singapore Management University (3; 1 online)
Oxford Intellectual Property Law	2003 (no rounds in 2020)	International	Intellectual property law	66 teams (2018); Online: 32 teams (2021)	Oxford	Qualification by written submissions	No	No	No	Queensland University of Technology (3)
Sarin Air Law	2010	International	Aviation law	41 teams (2018); Online: 36 teams (2021)	Varies	Yes	No	No	No	Ram Manohar University (3; 1 online)
PAX	2013	International	Private international law	41 Teams (2023)	Varies	No	No	No	No	University of Ljubljana (3)
Foreign Direct Investment International Arbitration	2008	International	Investor-state dispute settlement		Varies	Yes; direct qualification also possible	No	No	Yes	Murdoch University (2)
Nuremberg	2014 (no rounds in 2020)	International	International criminal law	50 teams (2019); Online: 50 teams (2021)	Nuremberg	Qualification by written submissions	Yes	No	No	Maastricht University (3; 1 online)
Stetson Environmental Law	1997 (2001 for international rounds)	International	International environmental law		Gulfport	Yes	No	No	Yes	Law Society of Ireland (4; 1 online)
Mandela World Human Rights	2009	International	International human rights law	164 teams (2018)	Geneva	Qualification by written and oral submissions	Yes	Yes	Yes	Norman Manley Law School (3)
International Maritime Law Arbitration	2000 (no rounds in 2020 and 2021)	International	International maritime law	34 teams (2020)	Varies	No	Yes	No	No	University of Queensland (9)
LAWASIA	2005 (semi-cancelled in 2019)	Regional	International commercial arbitration	41 teams (2018); Online: 17 teams (2020)	Varies	Yes (only Malaysia)	No	No	Only for Malaysia	Singapore Management University (5)
Red Cross IHL	2003 (2004 for international rounds; no rounds in 2020)	Regional	International humanitarian law	120 teams (2019)	Hong Kong	Yes (Hong Kong exempted)	For most countries	No	No	Victoria University of Wellington (3; 1 online)
African Human Rights	1992	Regional	Human rights in Africa		Varies within Africa	No	No	No	No	
The European Law Moot Court Competition	1988	Regional	European Union law		Luxembourg	Yes	Yes	No	No	
Asia Cup	1999 (no rounds in 2020)	Regional	Public international law	40 teams (2011)	Tokyo	Qualification by written submissions	Yes	No	No	National University of Singapore (7)
International Roman Law Moot Court	2008	Regional	Roman Law		Varies	No	No	No	No	University of Cambridge (3)
European Human Rights Moot Court Competition	2012	Regional	European Convention of Human Rights	120 teams (2013)	Strasbourg	Yes	Yes	No	No	IE University (2; 1 online)
The Victor's Moot (Perera)	2018	Regional	International commercial arbitration		Colombo	No	No	No	No	Singapore Management University (2)

=== Other types of competitions ===
Competition	Established	Type	Record annual participation (year)	Location of international finals	National or regional rounds	Cap on teams from same country or region	Pre-moots	Multiple teams from same institution	Most (international) championships
International Chamber of Commerce International Commercial Mediation	2005	Mediation	48 teams	Paris					
ADC-ICC Asia Pacific Commercial Mediation	2017	Mediation						Yes	
IBA-VIAC CDRC Vienna Mediation and Negotiation Competition	2015	Mediation and negotiation		Vienna					
Jean-Pictet Competition	1989	Various		Various	No	No	No	No	

== Domestic moot court competitions ==
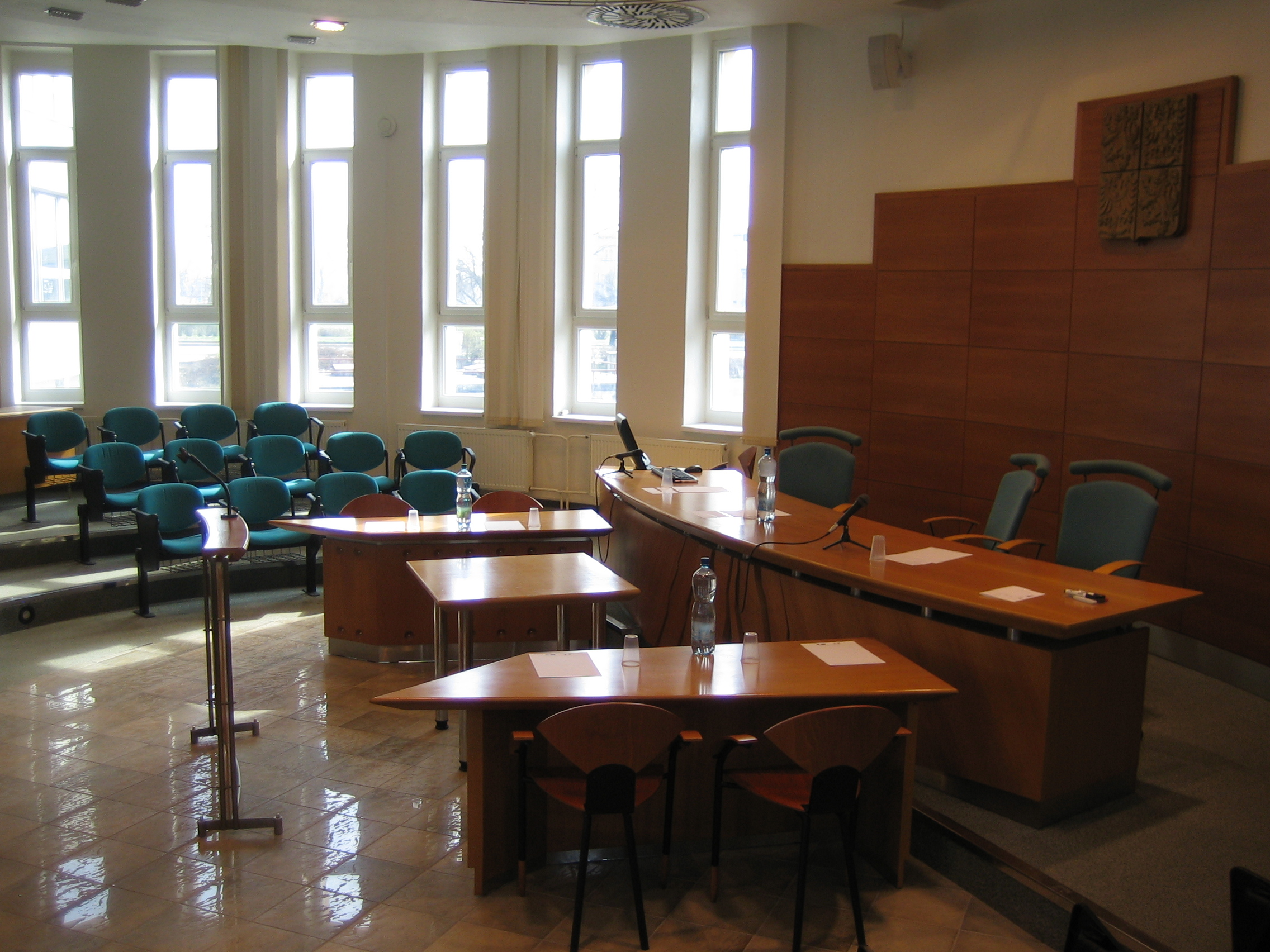
A law school's moot courtroom

=== North America ===
Some moot court organisations accept a small group of people for membership, and those members each participate in a number of national or regional moot court competitions. Other schools accept a larger number of members, and each member is matched with one competition. A few schools conduct moot court entirely intramurally. Moot court competitions are typically sponsored by organisations with interest in one particular area of law, and the moot court problems address an issue in that field. Competitions are often judged by legal practitioners with expertise in the particular area of law, or sometimes by sitting judges.

The basic structure of a moot court competition roughly parallels what would happen in actual appellate practice. Participants will typically receive a problem ahead of time, which includes the facts of the underlying case, and often an opinion from a lower court that is being challenged in the problem. Students must then research and prepare for that case as if they were lawyers or advocates for one or sometimes both of the parties. Depending on the competition, participants will be required to submit written briefs, participate in oral argument, or both. The case or problem is often one of current interest, sometimes mimicking an actual case, and sometimes fabricated to address difficult legal issues.

The annual inter-law school National Moot Court Competition, co-sponsored by the New York City Bar Association and the American College of Trial Lawyers, is among the oldest and most prestigious competitions in the United States. Other notable competitions include Harvard Law School's Ames Moot Court Competition and Canada's The Laskin Moot. A number of moot court competitions focus on specific areas of law. For example, the First Amendment Center annually holds a National First Amendment Moot Court Competition, in which the judges have included numerous United States Circuit Court judges.

While moot court is most commonly associated with law schools in North America, it is also a popular activity at the collegiate and high school levels. In the United States, the American Moot Court Association is the national governing body for undergraduate moot court. At the high school level, the National Association of Moot Court oversees a circuit of regional and national competitions each year.

=== United Kingdom ===
Notable competitions in the UK include the English Speaking Union Moot and London Universities Mooting Shield.

In England and Wales, moots typically simulate proceedings in either the Court of Appeal or the Supreme Court. Moot questions generally involve two questions of law that are under dispute and come with a set of facts about the case that have been decided at the first instance trial. Generally the question will surround a subject that is unclear under the present state of the law and for which no direct precedent exists. It is normal practice for the senior counsel to take on the first point and the junior the second; although this may vary depending upon the exact nature, and necessary length, of the arguments. Typically the question will focus on one area of law, such as tort, contract, criminal law or property law.

In Scotland a moot can be set in a variety of fora; in civil law problems it is set most commonly in either the Inner House of the Court of Session or in the House of Lords, although it is not uncommon for a moot to be heard in the Sheriff Court before the Sheriff or Sheriff Principal. Occasionally, an Employment Appeal Tribunal may also be used as a forum for a Scottish civil law moot. If the moot problem concerns Criminal Law, the moot will most likely be heard as though in the Appellate division of the High Court of Justiciary (commonly known as the Court of Criminal Appeal). Junior counsel is more likely to take the first moot point and senior counsel the second (this can however be reversed depending on the problem). The format of the moot is far more adversarial than that of English and Welsh moots. This manifests itself in different ways, most notably with the appellants and respondents facing each other during a moot, rather than, as in England and Wales, facing the judge.

== See also ==
- Mock trial
- Model United Nations
- Mootness, which has a precise meaning in United States law that is quite different from United Kingdom usage
