= European Law Students' Association =

- The European Law Students' Association
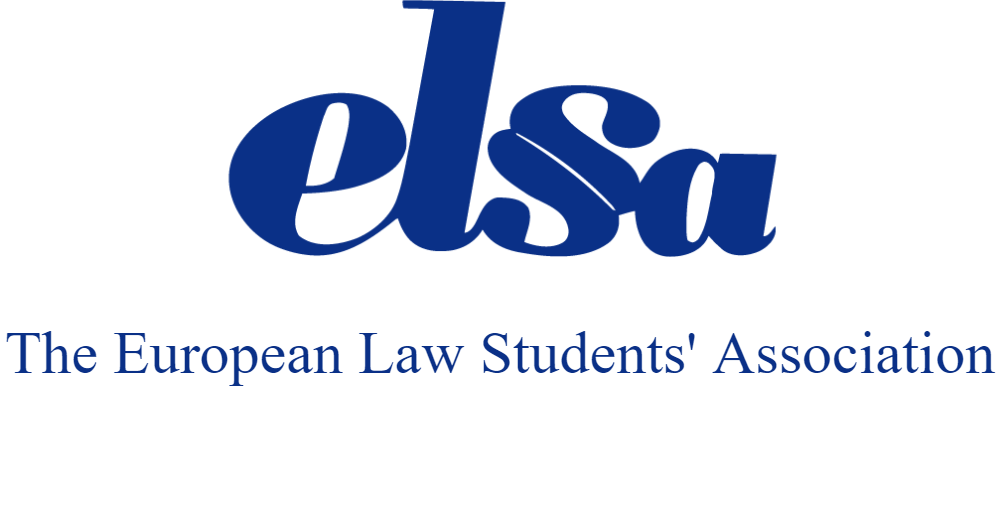

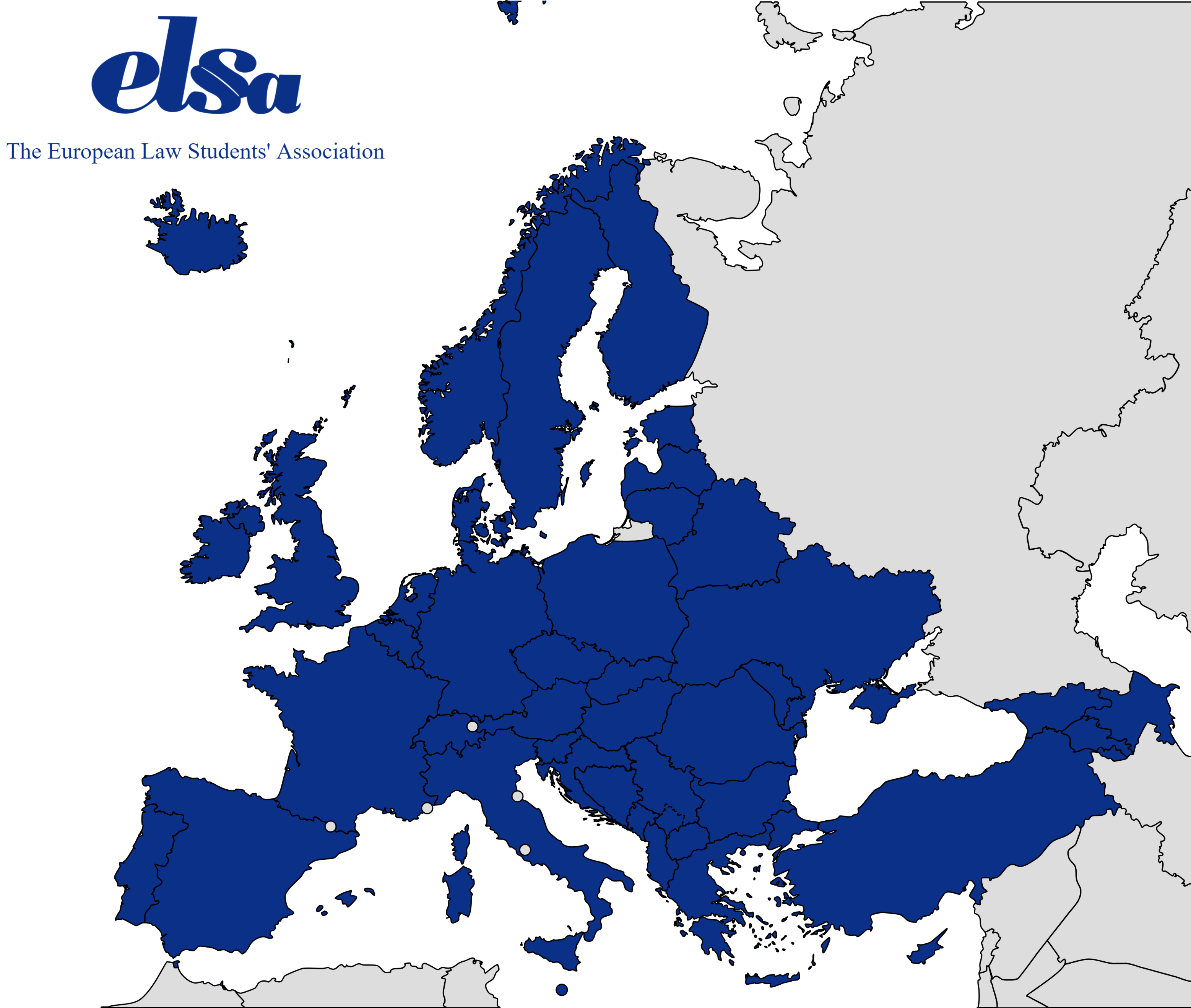
- Abbreviation: ELSA
- Formation: 4 May 1981; 45 years ago
- Founded at: Vienna
- Type: International non-governmental organization
- Purpose: To contribute to legal education, to foster mutual understanding and to promote social responsibility of law students and young lawyers.
- Headquarters: Blv. Général Jacques 239, 1050 Brussels, Belgium
- Region served: Mainly Europe – projects worldwide
- Members: 60,000 members in 41 countries
- Official language: English
- President: Elisabeth Rapp
- Secretary General: Aníta Lind Hlynsdóttir
- Treasurer: Elena Dević
- Main organ: International Board
- Website: elsa.org
- Remarks: Claims to be the world's largest independent, non-political and non-profit law students' association

The European Law Students' Association (ELSA) is an independent, non-political, non-profit, international non-governmental organisation run by and for law students. Its activities are compromised of a large variety of academic and professional events including moot court competitions, traineeship programmes, law school and delegations to international organisations to further enhance the students skills.

== History ==
ELSA was founded in Vienna on 4 May 1981 by five law students from Austria, Hungary, Poland, and West Germany.

== Organisation ==
ELSA is organised into local member groups active at university level (Local Group), national member groups active on a national level (National Group), and ELSA International active on an international level.

Membership of ELSA for individual law students is possible through the Local Groups (for instance ELSA Leiden or ELSA Tilburg). The Local Groups are member of a National Group (for instance ELSA the Netherlands). The National Groups are part of the international ELSA network, which is managed by ELSA International with headquarters in Brussels, Belgium. ELSA International consists of the International Board, the ELSA International Team, and the Auditors of ELSA.

The International Board is the supreme executive body of the association. Its members are elected at an International Council Meeting (ICM) (which consists of all the National Groups) for a one-year period. The International Board's responsibilities include the overall co-ordination of the organisation as a whole including the support of member groups both locally and nationally. The International Board also co-ordinates and develops ELSA's collaboration with various international organisations and institutions, governments, law firms, and companies across Europe.

== Institutional relations ==
ELSA has gained consultative status with several United Nations bodies. In 1994, ELSA was granted Consultative Status in Category C in UNESCO (United Nations Educational, Scientific and Cultural Organization), and in 1997 ELSA obtained Special Consultative Status with ECOSOC (United Nations Economic and Social Council). In addition UNCITRAL (United Nations Commission on International Trade Law) is inviting ELSA delegations to participate in their sessions.

ELSA was part of the Diplomatic Conference of 1998 in Rome where the Rome Statute of the International Criminal Court was adopted to establish the International Criminal Court. ELSA participated with a delegation as an NGO represented by an observer.

In 2000, ELSA was granted Participatory Status with the Council of Europe. This cooperation was extended with the signing of a Human Rights Partnership between Council of Europe and ELSA in 2008.

In October 2005, ELSA obtained Observer Status with WIPO (World Intellectual Property Organization).

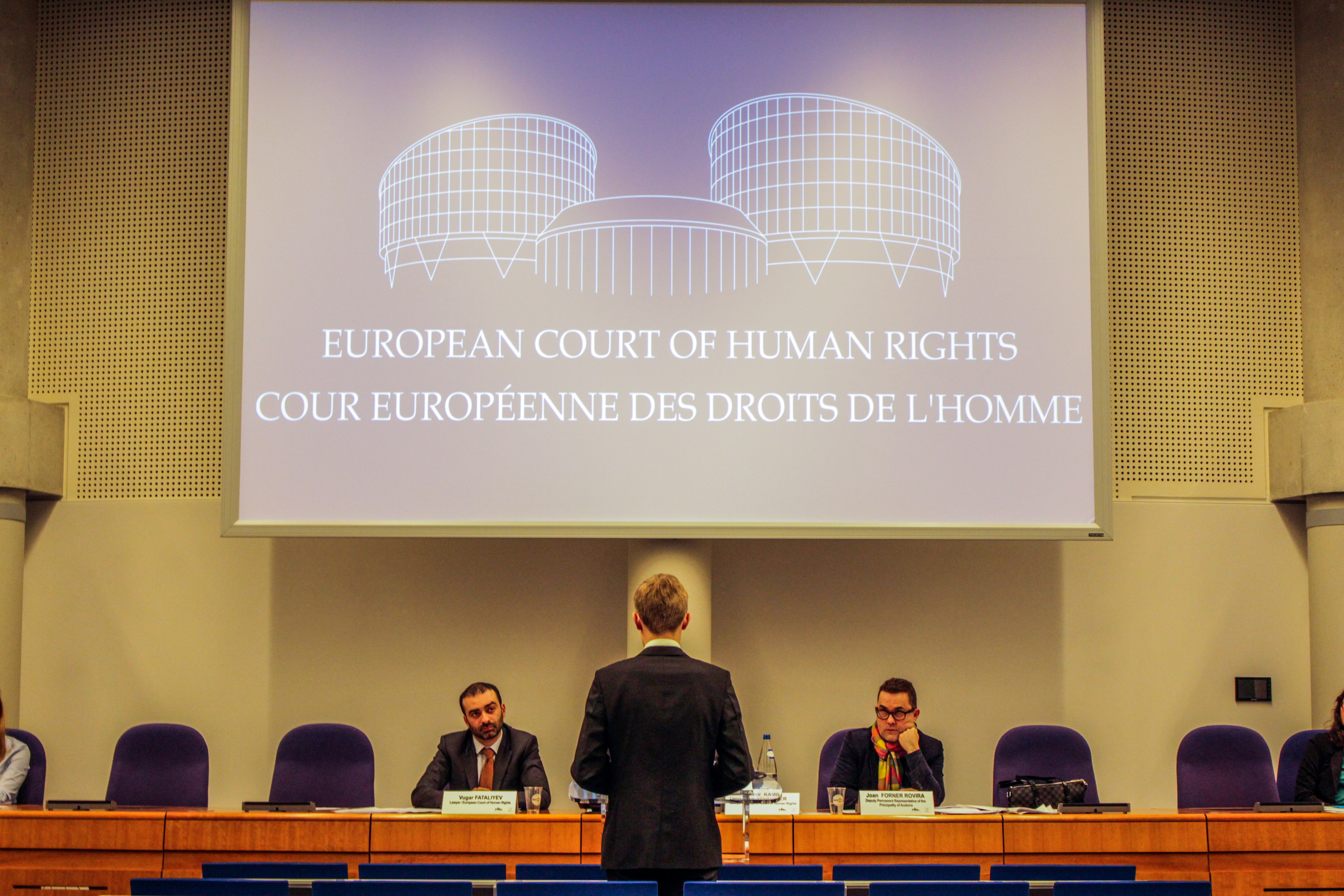
5th European Human Rights Moot Court Competition Final Round, 2017

Since 2002, ELSA has organised the John H. Jackson Moot Court Competition with the support of the WTO. The final round is held at the WTO headquarters in Geneva, Switzerland. Since 2012, it organizes the Helga Pedersen Moot Court Competition in cooperation with the Council of Europe. Formerly known as the European Human Rights Moot Court Competition it simulates proceedings before the European Court of Human Rights. Its final round is held onsite at the European Court of Human Rights in Strasbourg.

== Publications ==
The association´s ELSA Law Review is a student-edited, a peer-reviewed journal. Originally published from 1989 until 1996, it resumed publication in 2015. Its articles predominantely address international human rights law, alongside other areas of law.

== ELSA Network ==
ELSA has members in Albania, Armenia, Austria, Azerbaijan, Belgium, Bosnia and Herzegovina, Bulgaria, Croatia, the Czech Republic, Denmark, Estonia, Finland, France, Georgia, Germany, Greece, Hungary, Ireland, Italy, Iceland, Latvia, Lithuania, Luxembourg, Malta, Moldova, Montenegro, the Netherlands, North Macedonia, Norway, Poland, Portugal, Romania, Serbia, Slovakia, Slovenia, Spain, Sweden, Switzerland, Turkey, Ukraine, and the United Kingdom.

Furthermore, ELSA co-operates with other student organisations across the world, for instance the Asian Law Students' Association (ALSA) in Asia.
