= SMU Yong Pung How School of Law =

School of Law of the Singapore Management University

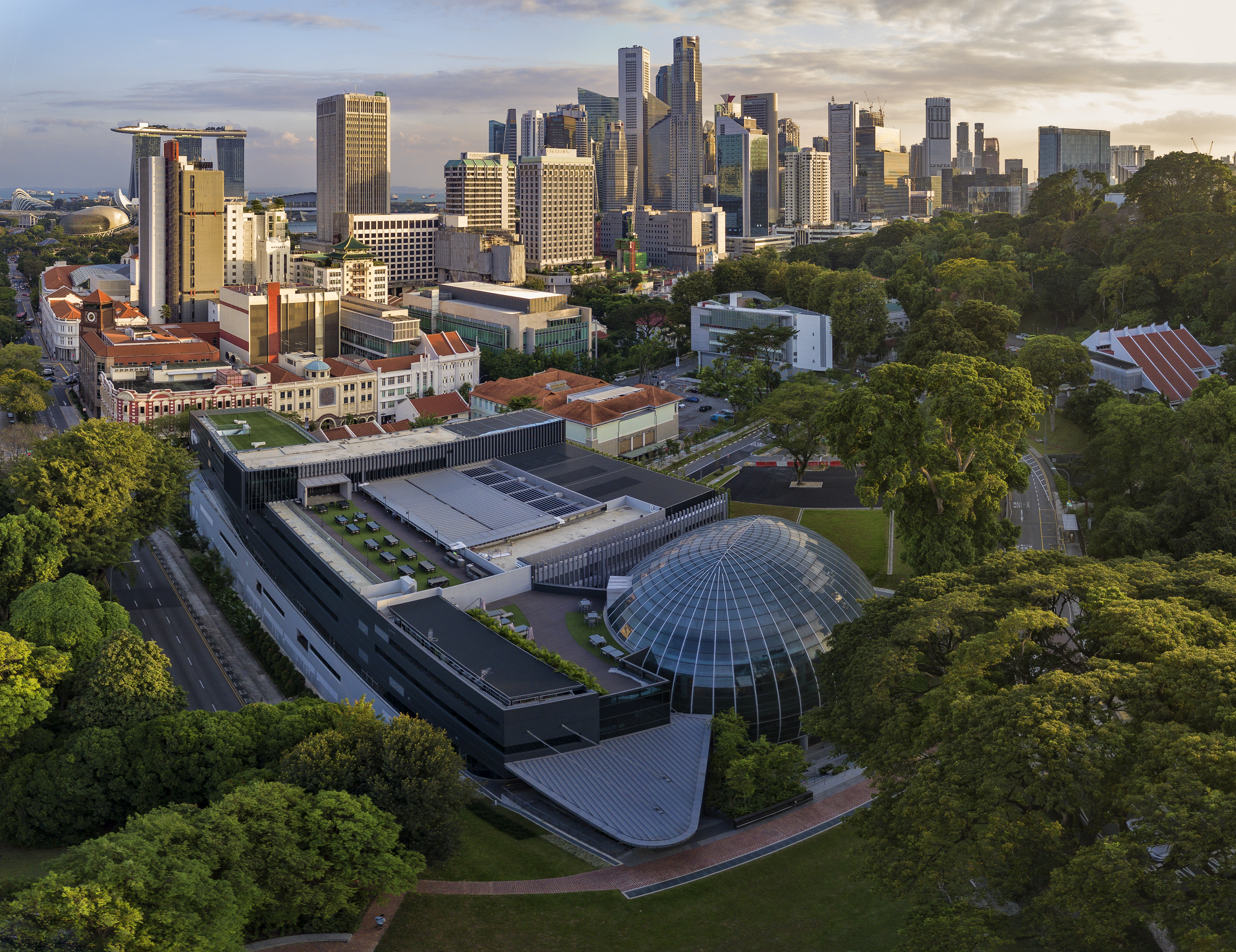
- The law school building at the corner of Armenian Street and Stamford Road with the city skyline in the background. Between 2007 and 2016, the law school shared its premises with the School of Accountancy and School of Business at Stamford Road.
- Type: Law school
- Established: 2007; 19 years ago
- Parent institution: Singapore Management University
- Dean: Lee Pey Woan
- Location: 55 Armenian Street, Singapore; 1.295367°N 103.848868°E
- Campus: Urban
- Colours: Purple
- Website: law.smu.edu.sg

The SMU Yong Pung How School of Law, previously SMU School of Law, is one of the six schools within the Singapore Management University. It was set up as Singapore's second law school in 2007, 50 years after the NUS Faculty of Law and 10 years before SUSS School of Law.

The school offers a four-year undergraduate single Bachelor of Laws (LLB) degree programme and a double degree programme combining the law degree programme with one of SMU's existing non-law programmes. The school also offers a graduate Juris Doctor (JD) programme as well as a Master of Laws (LLM) programme. The Dual LLM in Commercial Law, which confers LLM degrees from Queen Mary University of London and SMU, was launched in 2015. A PhD in Law, Commerce, and Technology was launched in 2021.

Prior to its establishment as a law school, the school was a department within the School of Business between 2000 and 2007. The school was known as the SMU School of Law until 2021, when it was renamed after former Chief Justice Yong Pung How.

Admission to the law programme is competitive: in the 2015 University Admissions Exercise, both the 10th and 90th percentile had an Indicative Grade Profile (of Singapore-Cambridge GCE A-Level qualifications) of AAA/A; approximately 1,300 applicants were shortlisted for an interview and a written test.

Since the launch of its international moots programme in 2011, the school has regularly featured in the championship final of the largest and most established international moot court competitions, such as the Jessup (2025 world champions), Vis East (3-time world champions), and International Criminal Court Moot (6-time world champions). The school also holds the world records for most international moot championship finals in a season and most international moot championships in a season.

== History ==
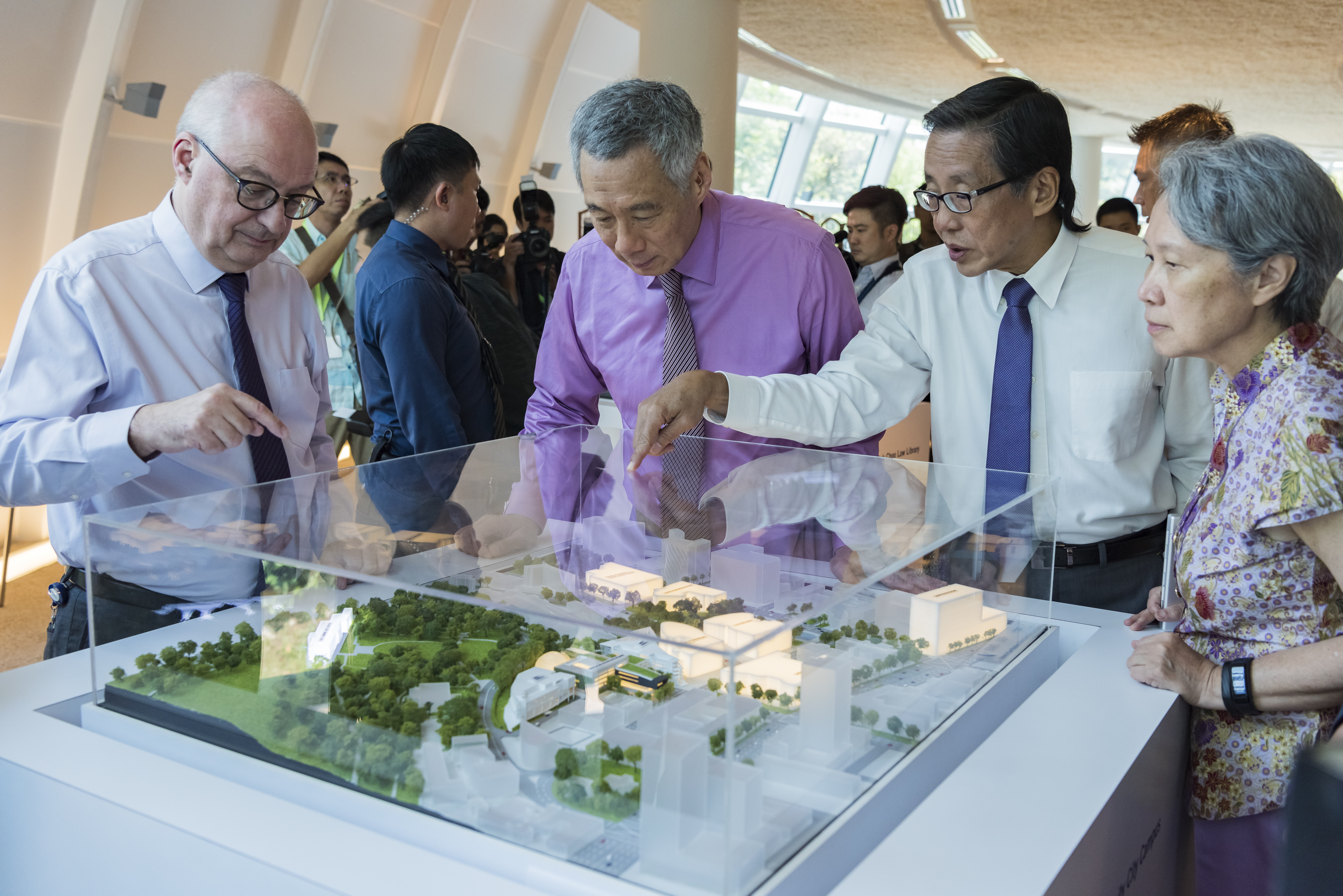
PM Lee Hsien Loong at the Kwa Geok Choo Law Library during the official launch of the School of Law building in 2017

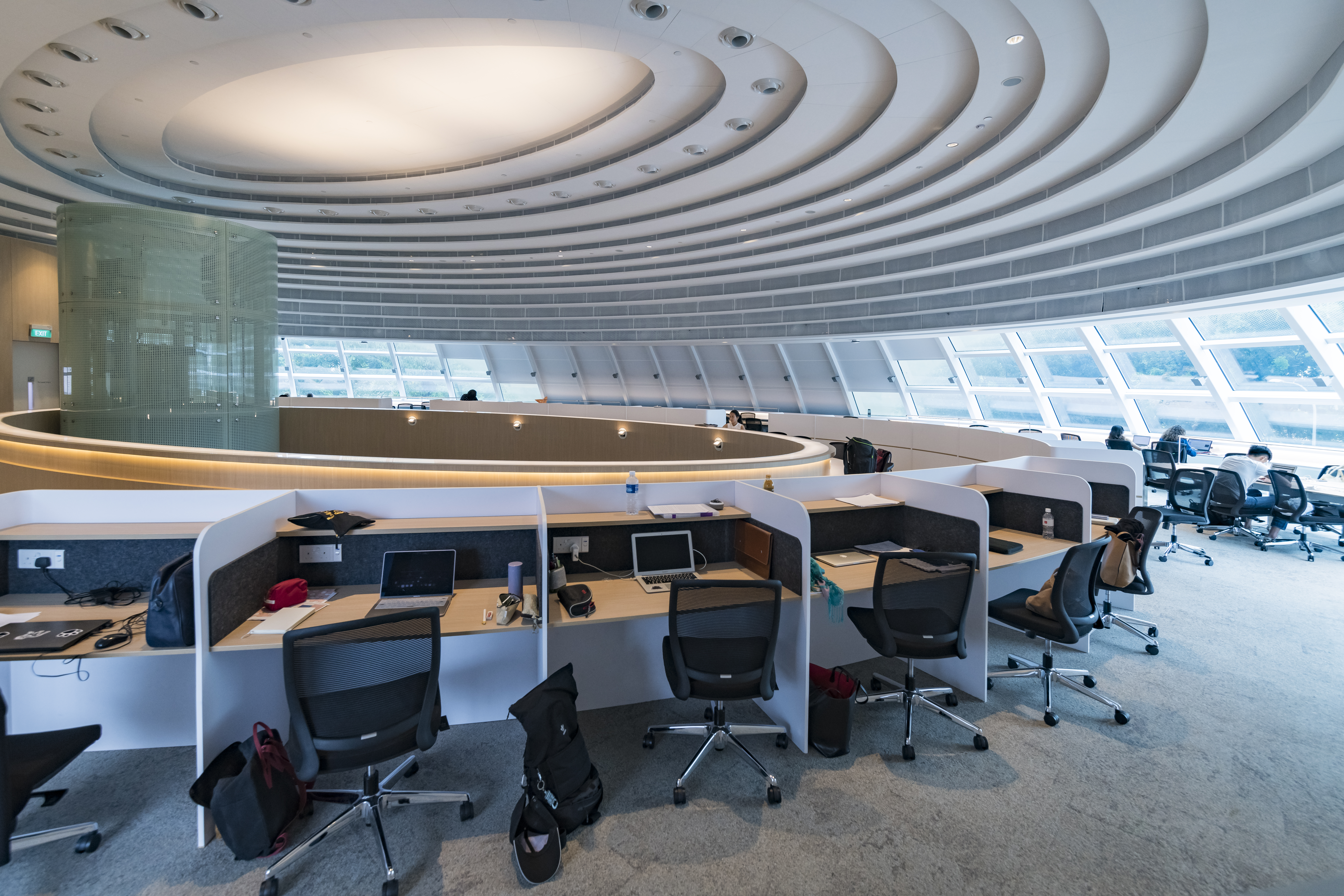
Inside the Kwa Geok Choo Law Library

In 2000, the Law Department was created as a department as part of the Lee Kong Chian School of Business in SMU, headed by Andrew Phang. A full-fledged law school was established in 2007 following a review by the government that concluded there was a shortage of qualified legal personnel in Singapore.

On 18 March 2009, the Doctor of Jurisprudence (JD) programme was launched. In May 2010, the Continuing Legal Education programme (since re-branded as SMU Law Academy) was launched.

In March 2013, the school became the first Asian law school to join the THEMIS network and in November that year a partnership was set up with Yonsei University for a dual JD programme.

The Applied Research Centre for Intellectual Assets and the Law in Asia (ARCIALA), as well as the Centre for Cross-Border Commercial Law in Asia (CEBCLA), were launched in May 2015 and in June that year the school signed a sponsorship and training agreement with WongPartnership. In August, it launched a dual LLM with Queen Mary, University of London.

The law school building relocated in December 2016 to Armenian Street, though the premises were only officially opened in March 2017, and in October 2017, a Pro Bono Centre was launched. At the same time, the Singapore Academy of Law's Singapore International Dispute Resolution Academy (SIDRA) was launched, which subsequently came under the auspices of the law school in 2019.

In June 2018, the school received a $4.5m grant from the National Research Foundation and IMDA to helm a research programme on AI and data use. In July that year it launched the LLM in Judicial Studies and in September the Centre for AI and Data Governance (CAIDG). In March 2020, the Centre for Computational Law was established after receiving a $15m grant from the NRF.

On 11 April 2021, SMU renamed the school to include former Chief Justice Yong Pung How's name as a recognition for his founding contributions to the university. CEBCLA was also renamed the Centre for Commercial Law in Asia (CCLA).

== Leadership ==
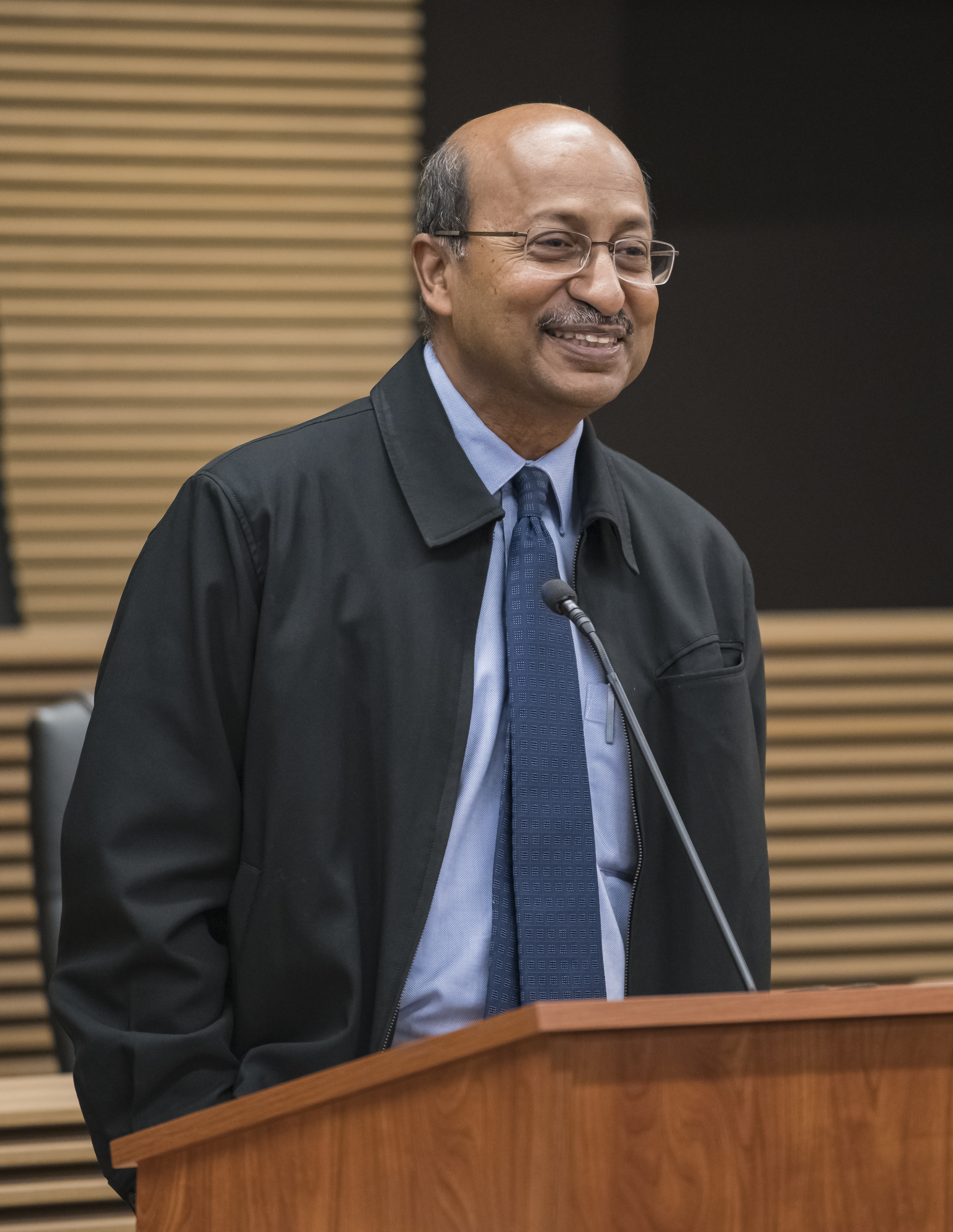
Former Judge of Appeal VK Rajah giving a speech at SMU School of Law in 2017. He was on the school's advisory board from 2008 to 2012 and 2017 to 2023.

The school's first dean was Michael Furmston, a leading authority on contracts and commercial law in the Commonwealth. He headed the school from its inception in 2007 to 2012. Yeo Tiong Min SC was then the dean from 2012 to 2017. Goh Yihan SC was subsequently dean from 2017 to 2022, before Lee Pey Woan took over in July 2022.

There is an advisory board which provides advisory assistance to the School of Law; it routinely includes Supreme Court judges, senior litigators, corporate lawyers, managing partners of law firms, and partners of foreign law firms. The advisory board was previously chaired by former Judge of Appeal and Attorney-General VK Rajah SC; Ang Cheng Hock took over in 2024. Rajah, together with former Judge of Appeal Chao Hick Tin, are presently Distinguished Fellows.

== Programmes ==
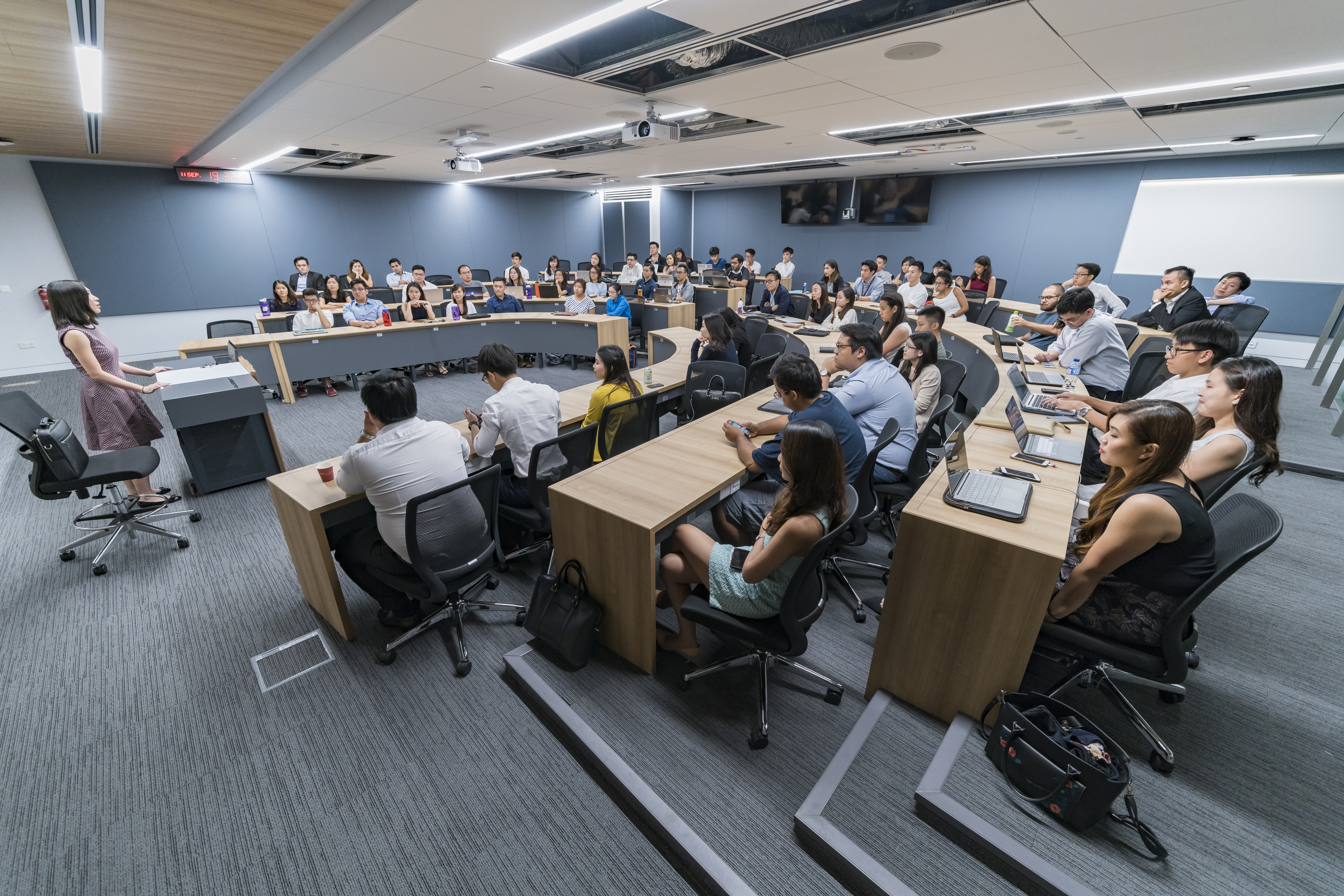
A seminar room

=== Undergraduate LLB ===
To be admitted to the Bachelor of Laws (LLB) programme, applicants should have good passes in their respective GCE A-Level subjects and also at minimum an A or a B for H1 General Paper or H2 Knowledge and Inquiry. In the 2015 University Admissions Exercise, both the 10th and 90th percentile had an Indicative Grade Profile (of 3H2/1H1 content-based subjects) of AAA/A. Potential candidates are called for a short written test and a group interview.

The LLB programme is a four-year programme; it is also possible to enroll in the double degree programme (combining law with accountancy, business, economics, software engineering, computer science, information systems, or social sciences) or to do a major (such as the Politics, Law, and Economics programme). Students must also complete ten weeks of internship and 80 hours of community service to graduate. The law school is partnered with law schools including Peking University, University of New South Wales, University of San Diego, and University of St Gallen for direct law-to-law exchange. The school offers an LLB + LLM dual degree programme with University of Melbourne and Bristol University.

Based on the 2017 Graduate Employment Survey, 97.6% of the school's graduates found employment; the school's graduates also commanded the highest mean basic monthly salary among all schools in the university. In the 2018 survey, the overall rate was 92.7%. In the 2023 survey, 99.2% found employment, with the mean gross monthly salary at $6,509 and median salary at $7,000. Alumni of the school are well-represented in the major law firms, the Supreme Court Justices' Law Clerk scheme, and leading postgraduate programmes

=== Juris Doctor ===
Introduced in 2009, the Juris Doctor programme is an additional route for persons who already have a degree in another discipline or a law degree not recognised for the purpose of admission to the Singapore Bar to become members of the Singapore legal profession. Applicants must have completed at least three years of full-time undergraduate education and show proficiency in the English language. SMU's JD curriculum is a mix of compulsory law courses and electives. Similar to all SMU undergraduates, six weeks of internship and 50 hours of community service are required for graduation. Students are required to complete a total of 25 Credit Units of law courses. Although students are expected to complete the programme within three years, the programme may be accelerated. Students may also enrol in the dual-JD programme with Yonsei Law School.

Completion of the either the LLB or JD allows a student to proceed directly to Part B of the local bar examination and be called as a lawyer.

=== LLM and PhD ===
There are three Master of Laws (LLM) options: the LLM in Cross-Border Business and Finance Law in Asia, the Dual LLM in Commercial Law (Singapore and London), and the LLM in Judicial Studies (which is offered jointly with the Supreme Court of Singapore). The first two options are one-year programmes while the dual LLM is a 15-month programme where students split their time between SMU and Queen Mary University of London. A PhD in Law, Commerce, and Technology was launched in 2021.

=== Professional ===
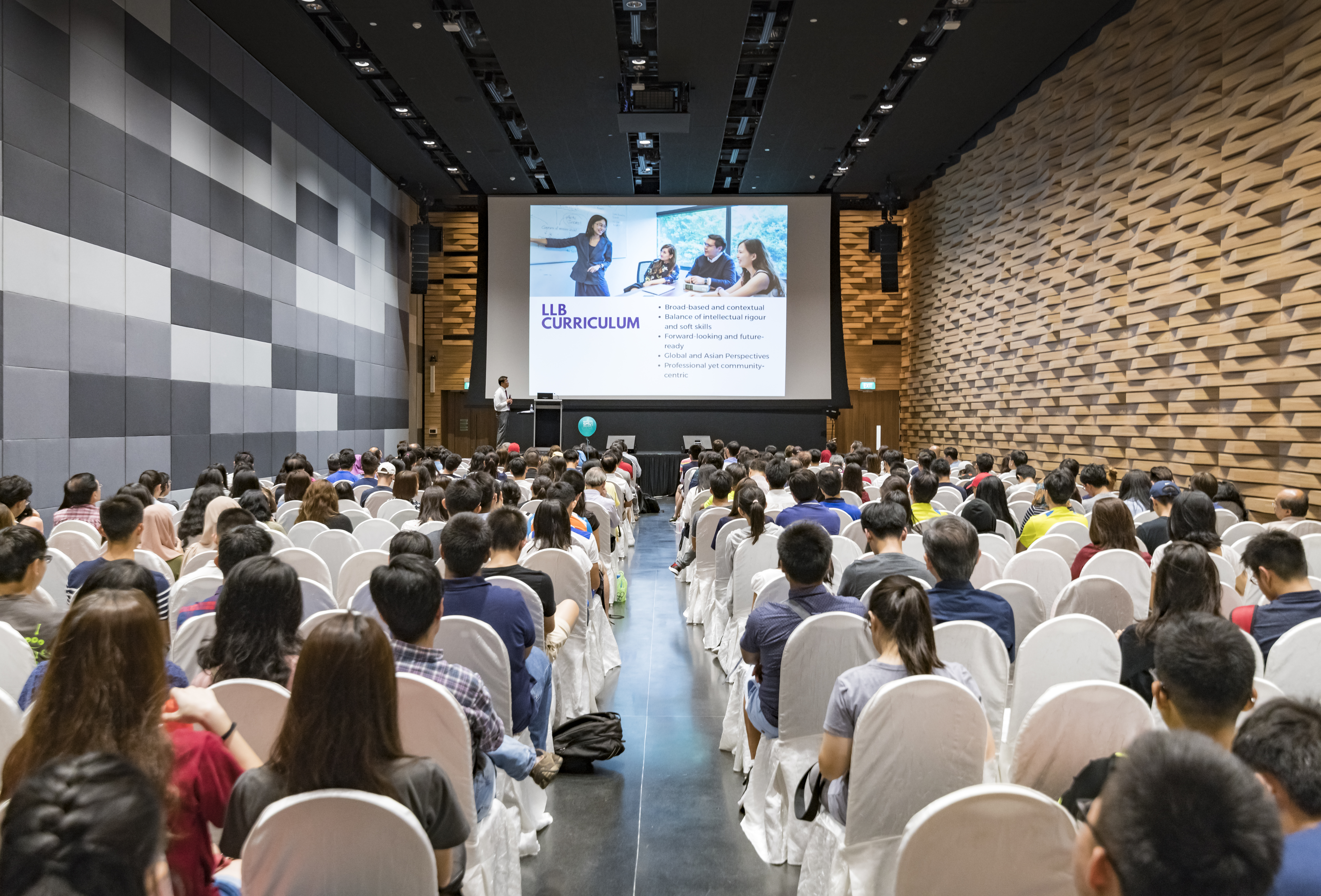
A segregated third of the function hall in the basement

The SMU Law Academy or SMULA runs seminars on developments in the law for the legal profession; attendees receive Continuing Professional Development points. Courses taught to the LLB, JD, and LLM students may also be audited. Since 2020, SMULA also offers a preparatory programme for Part A of the local bar examinations.

== Student life ==
=== International moot competitions ===
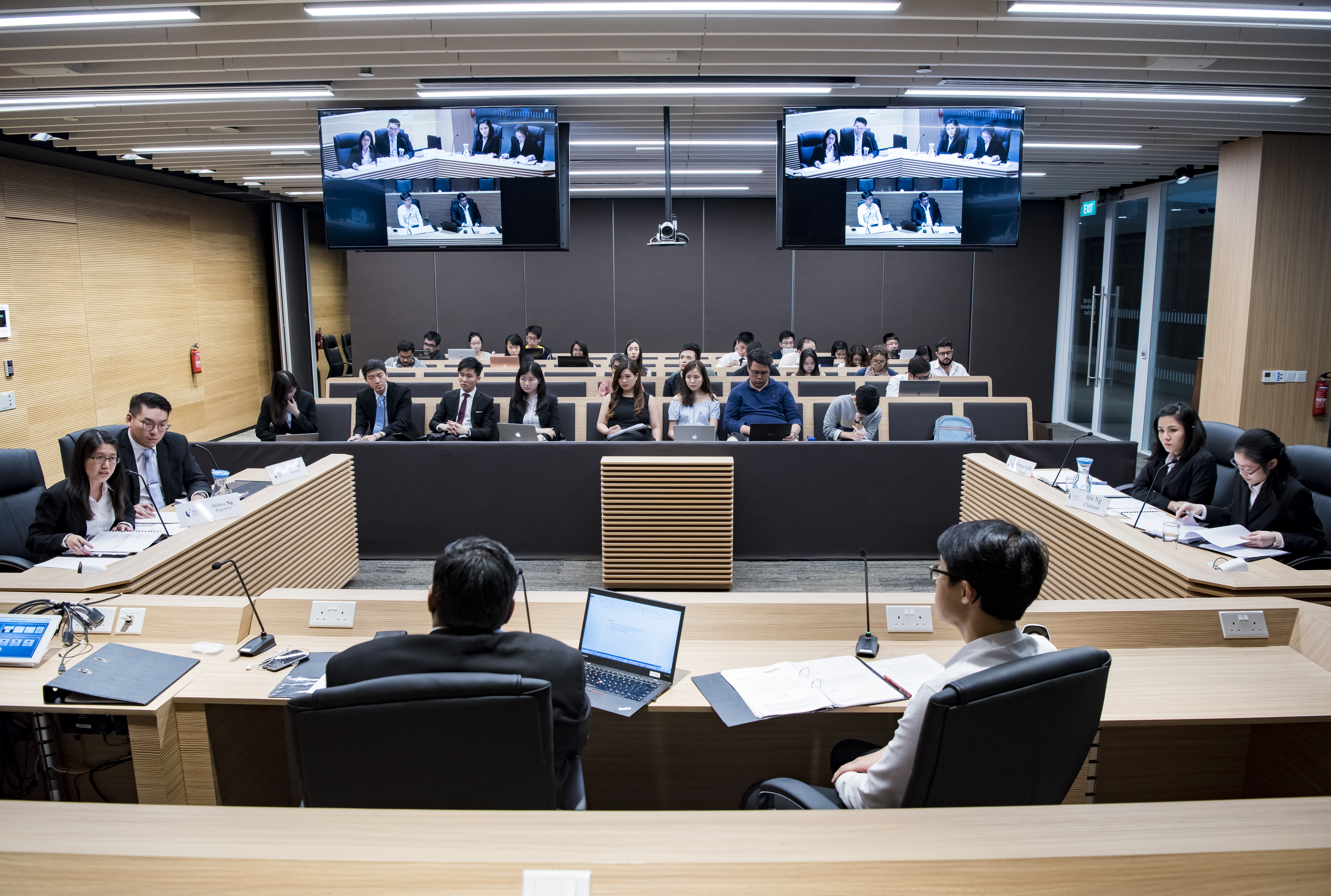
Moot court training session in progress at the David Marshall Moot Court

Since the launch of its international moots programme in 2010, the school has been to the championship final of the largest and most established international moot court competitions, including Jessup (2013, 2014, 2022, 2025), Vis (2015, 2016, 2021), Vis East (2015, 2016, 2022, 2025), Price (2010, 2015, 2016, 2017, 2018, 2020, 2024, 2025), International Criminal Court (2015, 2016, 2017, 2018, 2021, 2024, 2025), Frankfurt (2015, 2017, 2022, 2025), IHL (2016, 2019, 2022, 2025), and Lachs (2024). As of June 2025, SMU has emerged champions 70 times, 1st runner-up 49 times, and 2nd runner-up 60 times in international moot competitions, in addition to more than 350 Best Oralist and Best Memorial prizes and dozens of national and regional round championships.

SMU set a world record of 11 international moot finals in a single season in 2024/25; it also holds the record for most wins in a single season with seven, also in 2024/25. It was the first university in the history of international moots to successfully defend a major moot international title when it won back-to-back championships in the ICC moot in 2015 and 2016 (a feat it repeated in 2024 and 2025); it became the second university to do the same when it won back-to-back championships in the Price moot in 2016 and 2017. In 2022, it was ranked No. 1 worldwide in moots by nica.team for the fourth time, following a record six international titles for the season.

=== International mediation and negotiation competitions ===
SMU has won and achieved podium finishes in various international mediation and negotiation competitions such as Advocate Maximus (2018 and 2019), ICC Mediation Australia (2020), CDRC Vienna (2018 and 2023), SK Misra Negotiation (2023), ODRC (2023), Lex Infinitum (2023), HSF-Delhi Negotiation (2024), and A&O Dealmaking (2024).

=== Law reform and public legal education ===
SMU students have given representations at various law reform efforts, including during the 2016 Constitutional Commission's hearing on the elected presidency and the 2018 Select Committee's hearing on deliberate online falsehoods.

In terms of public legal education efforts, the student club Lexicon collaborates with the Supreme Court of Singapore to write case briefs on selected Court of Appeal judgments. In 2021, Lexicon launched its law journal, Singapore Law Journal.

== Research impact ==
The faculty have appeared as amicus curiae before courts in Singapore and overseas. The faculty have also authored various leading texts regularly cited by the courts, such as The Law of Torts in Singapore by Gary Chan and The Law of Contract in Singapore by Goh Yihan et al.

In the QS World University Rankings by subject, the school was ranked 101–150 for Law and Legal Studies in 2021 and 90–100 in 2022. As a university, SMU was ranked 71–80 in 2021 by QS for Top Young Universities.

== Notable alumni ==
- Pritam Singh (JD'11): Member of Parliament and Secretary-General of The Workers' Party
- Nadia Ahmad Samdin (LLB'13): Member of Parliament
- Zhulkarnain Abdul Rahim (LLM'13): Member of Parliament
- Fadli Fawzi (JD'16): Member of Parliament
