= Dr. Ram Manohar Lohiya National Law University =

Law school in Uttar Pradesh, India

- Motto: धर्मसंस्थापनार्थाय (Sanskrit)
- Type: National Law University
- Established: 2005 (21 years ago)
- Affiliations: UGC, BCI
- Chairperson: Chief Minister of Uttar Pradesh
- Vice-Chancellor: Dr. Amar Pal Singh
- Visitor: Justice Vikram Nath
- Location: Lucknow, Uttar Pradesh, India
- Campus: 40 acres (16 ha); Urban
- Website: www.rmlnlu.ac.in

Dr. Ram Manohar Lohiya National Law University, also known as RMLNLU or NLU Lucknow , is a public law school and a National Law University located in Lucknow, Uttar Pradesh, India. It was established as Dr. Ram Manohar Lohiya National Law Institute undergraduate and post-graduate legal education, later in 2006 it was renamed as RMLNLU to give a NLU touch to its name. It is one among the 26 NLUs across India and the first one established in Uttar Pradesh. It is ranked 21st among all law schools in India, according to NIRF 2025 rankings.

== History ==
Dr. Ram Manohar Lohiya National Law University, was established by an Act of Govt. of Uttar Pradesh in 2005 by then Chief minister Mulayam Singh Yadav and came into being on 4 January 2006 to meet up the new challenges in legal field. Originally incorporated as 'Dr. Ram Manohar Lohiya National Law Institute, Uttar Pradesh' word 'Institute' was substituted by the 'University' later, via an amendment in the Act in November 2006. This was done to give a comprehensive national character to the institute on lines with the other National Law Universities of the country.

== Academics, rankings, and courses ==
=== Admission, courses, and ranking ===
The admission to RMLNLU is possible through Common Law Admission Test (CLAT) it is a centralized test for admission to prominent National Law Universities in India. It is one of the most competitive entrance examination in India. All admissions in RMLNLU, for both undergraduate and postgraduate programs are made on the basis of performance in the CLAT exam. (Part-time courses have a different selection procedure)

=== Academic programmes ===
The university currently only offers B.A.LL.B. (Hons.) (Five years integrated programme), LL.M. (One year programme), PhD. and a few PG courses which are part-time .

==== Undergraduate ====
RMLNLU offers undergraduates a five-year integrated B.A./LL.B. (Hons.) programme which, upon completion, qualifies the student to sit for the bar to practice law in India or work as a corporate lawyer or in other law, non-law related fields.

The intake capacity of B.A. LL.B. (Hons.) Programme is 169 + 18 NRI Seats ( it may change from year to year )

==== Postgraduate ====
RMLNLU offers a one-year degree in LL.M. programme.

The intake is 24 and 07 (supernumerary seats), ( it may change year to year )

==== Diploma courses ====
The university is also running a one-year Post-graduate Diploma Programme in Cyber Law since 2014, one year Post-graduate diploma Programme in Intellectual Property Right since 2015 and One Year Post-graduate Diploma Programme in Media Law, Entertainment and Ethics since 2019.

==== Foreign language ====
RMLNLU offers certificate courses in French, German and Spanish.

=== Rankings ===
The university was ranked 8th by India Today's "India's Best Law Colleges 2025". The National Institutional Ranking Framework (NIRF) ranked it 21st among law colleges in 2025.

== Cut offs ==
=== Bachelor of Arts, Bachelor of Laws (BA LLB Hons) ===
Year	Category	Home State closing rank	All India closing rank
2025	General (GEN)	2020	780
2025	OBC	3769	
2025	EWS	2088	
2025	SC	11288	
2025	ST	19305	
2024	General (GEN)	2020	779
2024	OBC	3613	
2024	EWS	2834	
2024	SC	10340	
2024	ST	34174	

== Student committees and campus ==
=== Student committees ===
- Legal Aid Committee: Among other things, the committee runs a legal aid clinic where marginalized sections of the society can get free legal advice.
- Moot Court Committee
- Debate and Discussion Committee
- Cultural Committee (Tehzeeb). It also conducts annual cultural fest known as 'Riwaayat'.
- Journal Committee
- Internship and Placement
- Sports Committee
- Seminar Committee
- Student Welfare Committee

=== Campus ===
NLU Lucknow's campus is approximately 40 acres. The campus is large with its own shopping complex, fields, indoor games facility, gyms, Olympic-size swimming pools, halls, moot court, hostels, and classes. The hostel's dining serves hotel-style food, which includes both veg and non-veg dishes.

== See also ==
- Dr. Rajendra Prasad National Law University
- Legal education in India
- List of law schools in India
