= Asia Cup Moot =

International moot court competition

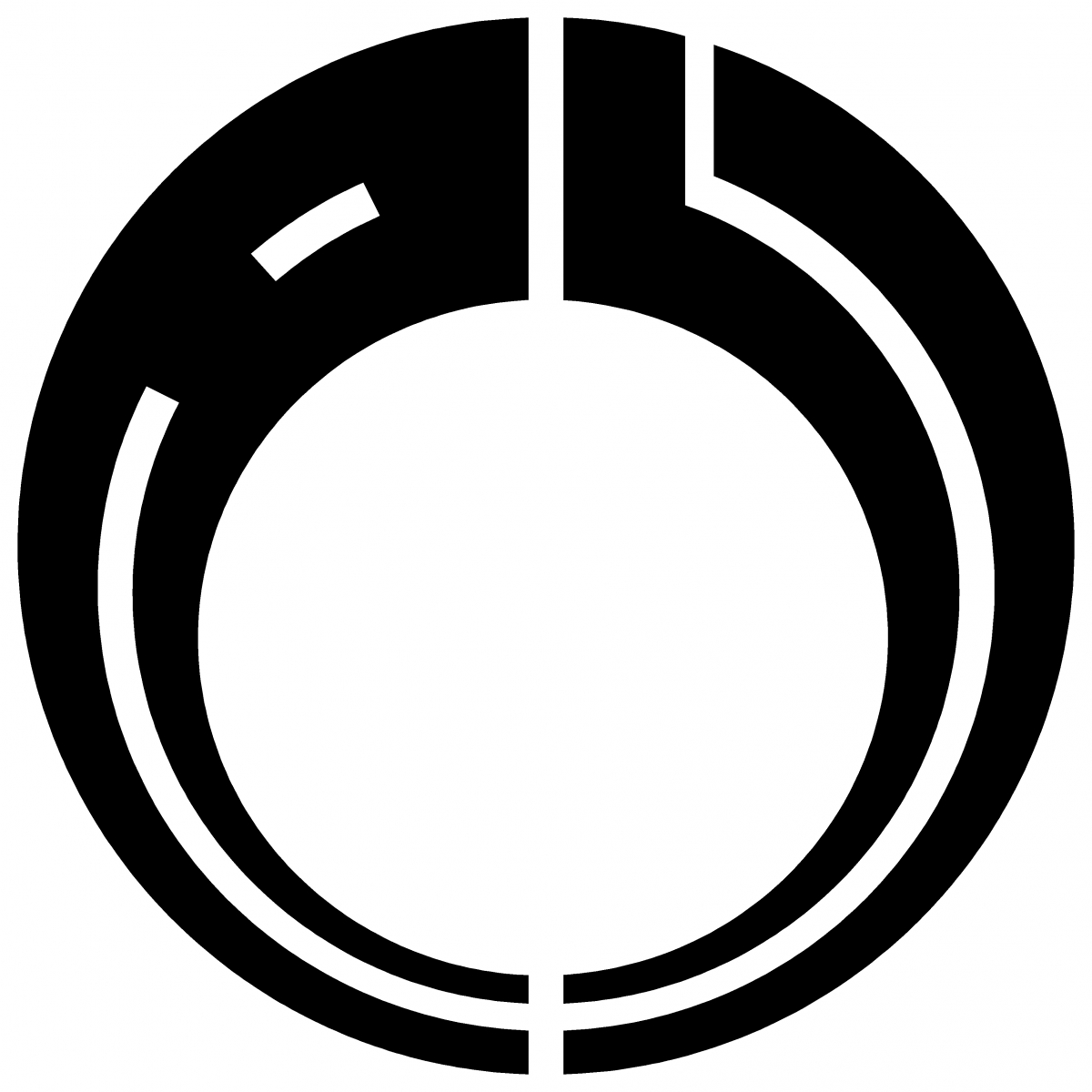
- Established: 1999
- Venue: Tokyo
- Subject matter: Public international law
- Class: Regional
- Record participation: 40+ teams (2023)
- Qualification: National rounds (memorials)
- Most championships: National University of Singapore (7)
- Website: http://asiacup.sakura.ne.jp/

The Asia Cup Moot, or Asia Cup in short, is an annual international moot court competition that is open to law schools in Asia. The competition inaugurated in 1999 and is held in Tokyo, Japan. It is jointly organised by the Ministry of Foreign Affairs of Japan and the Japanese Society of International Law, and the moot problem typically contains issues pertaining to public international law, international humanitarian law, and international human rights. The top 16 teams based on memorial scores qualify for the international rounds in Tokyo, but generally each country except Japan is only permitted to send one team. Each team may feature up to four oralists. As of 2023, 61 different law schools have competed in Tokyo since the moot's inception.

For some schools, the moot (as is the Red Cross International Humanitarian Law Moot) is seen as a rite of passage for Asian mooters before they go on to participate in the larger international moots, such as the Jessup Moot and Vis Moot. National University of Singapore is the most successful schools winning six championships. The Philippines and Singapore, with ten wins apiece, are the most successful countries. Due to COVID-19, the 2020 edition of the moot was cancelled, and the 2021 and 2022 editions held online.

== Competition records ==
Year	Total number of teams	Champion (win number)	Runner-up (win number)	Top oralists (win number)	Top memorials (win number)	International debut
2025	20+	Ateneo Law School (6)	National University of Singapore (1)			
2024	30+	National University of Singapore (7)	University of the Philippines (1)	Tashkent University (1)	* A: Diplomatic Academy of Vietnam (1) * R: University of the Philippines (1)	
2023	40+	University of Dhaka (1)	National University of Management (1)	* 1st: National University of Management (1) * 1st: Singapore Management University (8)	* A: University of Dhaka (1) * R: National University of Management (1)	* National University of Management * Rajiv Gandhi National University of Law * Denning Law School * Imam Sadiq University
2022 (online)	30+	Singapore Management University (5)	Sebelas Maret University (1)	* 1st: Singapore Management University (6) * 1st: Singapore Management University (7)	* 1st: Kyoto University (3) * 2nd: University of Malaya (3) * 3rd: Sebelas Maret University (1) * 4th: Thammasat University (1) * 5th: Singapore Management University (4)	* Sebelas Maret University
2021 (online)	35	Singapore Management University (4)	Parahyangan Catholic University (1)	* 1st: Singapore Management University (4) * 1st: Singapore Management University (5)	* 1st: Parahyangan Catholic University (2) * 2nd: University of Malaya (2) * 3rd: Ateneo Law School (1)	* Chanakya National Law University * Kutafin Moscow State Law University * Ritsumeikan Asia Pacific University
2019		University of the Philippines (5)	Russian State University of Justice (1)			* Chinese University of Hong Kong * Russian State University of Justice * BRAC University
2018	30+	National University of Singapore (6)	University of Malaya (2)			* National University of Mongolia * Tribhuvan University * University of Malakland * Yokohama City University * Yonsei University
2017	30+	National University of Singapore (5)	Thammasat University (1)	* 1st: National University of Singapore (3) * 1st: National University of Singapore (4)	* 1st: Universitas Padjadjaran (1) * 2nd: University of St La Salle (1) * 3rd: National University of Singapore (1)	* Nalsar University of Law * Shanghai University of Finance and Economics * University of Karachi * University of St La Salle
2016	31	National University of Singapore (4)	Ateneo Law School (2)	* 1st: National University of Singapore (2) * 2nd: Ateneo Law School (2) * 3rd: Ateneo Law School (2)	* 1st: National University of Singapore (2) * 2nd: University of Malaya (1) * 3rd: Kyoto University (1)	* Nepal Law Campus
2015	31	University of Malaya (1)	Singapore Management University (3)	* 1st: Singapore Management University (3) * 2nd: Singapore Management University (1) * 2nd: Waseda University (1)	* 1st: Parahyangan Catholic University (1) * 2nd: Kyoto University (1) * 3rd: Waseda University (3)	* De La Salle University * Ho Chi Minh City University of Law * University of Jaffna
2014	39	Singapore Management University (3)	Universitas Padjadjaran (1)	* 1st: Singapore Management University (2) * 2nd: Ateneo Law School (1) * 3rd: Singapore Management University (5) * 4th: Ateneo Law School (3) * 5th: Singapore Management University (2)	* 1st: Thammasat University (1) * 2nd: Waseda University (2) * 3rd: Universitas Padjadjaran (2)	NA
2013	20	Ateneo Law School (5)	Singapore Management University (2)	* 1st: Singapore Management University (1) * 2nd: Universitas Padjadjaran (1) * 3rd: Singapore Management University (4) * 4th: Singapore Management University (1) * 4th: Singapore Management University (2)	* 1st: Kyoto University (2) * 2nd: Universitas Padjadjaran (1) * 3rd: Waseda University (2) * 3rd: * 5th: Singapore Management University (3)	* Handong Global University * Advance Tertiary College
2012	30+	Ateneo Law School (4)	Singapore Management University (1)	* 1st: Ateneo Law School (3) * 2nd: Peking University (1) * 3rd: Peking University (1) * 4th: Ateneo Law School (2) * 5th: Singapore Management University (1)	* 1st: Ateneo Law School (1) * 2nd: Waseda University (1) * 3rd: Universitas Gadjah Mada (1) * 4th: Sophia University (1) * 5th: Chulalongkorn University * 5th: Singapore Management University (2) * 5th: Peking University (1)	* Soongsil University * Peking University
2011	40	Singapore Management University (2)	Ateneo Law School (1)	* 1st: Ateneo Law School (1) * 2nd: Waseda University (1) * 3rd: Singapore Management University (3) * 4th: Universitas Pelita Harapan (1) * 4th: Universitas Pelita Harapan (2) * 4th: University of Hong Kong (2) * 4th: Ateneo Law School (2)	* 1st: Kyoto University (1) * 2nd: Universiti Sultan Zainal Abidin (1) * 3rd: Waseda University (1) * 4th: Ateneo Law School * 5th: Singapore Management University (1) * 5th: Diplomatic Academy of Vietnam (1) * 5th: Atma Jaya Catholic University of Indonesia (1)	* Universiti Sultan Zainal Abidin * Atma Jaya Catholic University of Indonesia
2010	20+	Singapore Management University (1)	Universitas Pelita Harapan (1)	* 1st: University of the Philippines (2) * 2nd: Universitas Pelita Harapan (2) * 3rd: Singapore Management University (1) * 3rd: Singapore Management University (2) * 5th: Universitas Pelita Harapan (1)	* 1st: University of the Philippines (2) * 2nd: Diplomatic Academy of Vietnam (2) * 3rd: Singapore Management University (1) * 3rd: Universitas Pelita Harapan (2) * 5th: Renmin University (1)	* Singapore Management University * Universiti Utara Malaysia * Renmin University
2009		University of the Philippines (4)	Kathmandu Law School (1)	* 1st: University of the Philippines (1) * 2nd: Kathmandu Law School (1) * 3rd: University of the Philippines (1) * 4th: National University of Singapore (2) * 4th: National University of Singapore (3)	* 1st: University of the Philippines (1) * 2nd: Diplomatic Academy of Vietnam (1) * 3rd: Universitas Padjadjaran (1) * 4th: Parahyangan Catholic University (1) * 5th: Thammasat University (1)	* Kathmandu Law School * Universitas Padjadjaran
2008		Ateneo Law School (3)	University of Hong Kong (1)	* 1st: Thammasat University (1) * 2nd: Universitas Pelita Harapan (1) * 3rd: Thammasat University (1) * 4th: Ateneo Law School (1) * 4th: National University of Singapore (1) * 4th: University of Hong Kong (1)	* 1st: University of Hong Kong (1) * 2nd: Ateneo Law School (2) * 3rd: Thammasat University (1) * 4th: Diplomatic Academy of Vietnam (1) * 5th: University of Indonesia (1)	* Diplomatic Academy of Vietnam * Lahore University * Thammasat University
2007	19	University of the Philippines (3)	Chulalongkorn University (1)	* 1st: National University of Singapore (1) * 2nd: Chulalongkorn University (1) * 3rd: National University of Singapore (1) * 4th: University of Dhaka (1) * 5th: University of Indonesia (1)	* 1st: Chulalongkorn University (1) * 2nd: University of Indonesia (1) * 3rd: Universitas Pelita Harapan (1) * 4th: University of Philippines (1) * 5th: University of Dhaka (1)	* University of Dhaka * Universitas Pelita Harapan * Aoyama Gakuin University * Sophia University * Far Eastern University Institute of Law * Institute for International Relations
2006	10	University of Indonesia (1)	University of Malaya (1)	* 1st: University of Hong Kong (1) * 2nd: University of Indonesia (1) * 3rd: Ateneo Law School (1) * 3rd: University of Hong Kong (1) * 5th: National University of Singapore (1)	* 1st: National University of Singapore (1) * 2nd: Ateneo Law School (1) * 3rd: University of Indonesia (1) * 4th: University of Hong Kong (1) * 5th: Waseda University (1)	* University of Hong Kong
2005	9	National University of Singapore (3)	University of Indonesia (2)	* 1st: University of Indonesia (1) * 2nd: National University of Singapore (1)		* University of Osaka
2004	12	National University of Singapore (2)	University of Indonesia (1)			
2003	12	University of the Philippines (2)				
2002	9	Ateneo Law School (2)				* Tohoku University
2001	12	National University of Singapore (1)				* National University of Singapore * Chulalongkorn University * Parahyangan Catholic University
2000	9	University of the Philippines (1)				* Kyoto University * University of Philippines * Tsinghua University * Waseda University
1999	6	Ateneo Law School (1)				* Ateneo Law School * University of Indonesia * Institute of International Relations * National University of Laos * University of Malaya * University of Tokyo
