= MIPR =

MIPR may refer to:

- Military Interdepartmental Purchase Request, a logistics process of the United States military
- Masters in Intellectual Property Rights, a post-graduate degree programme of National Law University, Jodhpur
- Ministry of Industry and Primary Resources, a department of the Government of Brunei
- IEEE International Workshop on Multimedia Information Processing and Retrieval (IEEE-MIPR), an annual conference run by the Institute of Electrical and Electronics Engineers
- Manhattan Institute for Policy Research
