= LAWASIA Moot =

Annual international moot court competition

- Established: 2005
- Venue: Varies
- Subject matter: International commercial arbitration
- Class: Regional
- Record participation: 40 teams (2011)
- Qualification: National rounds
- Most championships: Singapore Management University School of Law (5)
- Website: http://lawasiamoot.org

The LAWASIA International Moot Competition ("LAWASIA Moot") is an annual international moot court competition that is organised by LAWASIA, an international organisation mainly comprising bar associations, lawyers, judges, and academics. The moot problem ranges from international human rights to international commercial arbitration, and the venue of the competition rotates between LAWASIA member states as it is usually held in conjunction with the annual LAWASIA Conference. Up to 40 law schools from around the world take part in the moot each year, with Malaysia and India being the only jurisdictions thus far to conduct national rounds. In the international rounds, teams would compete in up to ten rounds if they reach the championship final, which is usually judged by notable judges and practitioners.

The first edition of the moot was in 2005 and took place in Gold Coast, Australia. No moot took place in 2006 but the competition resumed in 2007 without any break in editions thereafter, before the 2019 riots in Hong Kong saw the withdrawal of many teams from the 14th edition. For the 2020 edition, while originally designated to be held in Mongolia, the international rounds were held online via Zoom due to travel restrictions brought about by Covid-19. The 2021 competition retained the online format due to continued travel restrictions. Since 2022, the format has reverted to in-person.

Singapore Management University, which made its debut in 2009 and missed the 2010 and 2019 editions, has the best track record in this competition with five championships, six runners-up titles, five Best Oralist titles, and four Best Memorials titles. It also holds the record for the most number of final appearances (ten) and consecutive championship final appearances (five). Malaysia, with seven championships, is the winningest country.

== Competition records ==
Year	Venue	Total number of teams	Champion (win number)	Runner-up (win number)	Best Oralist (win number)	Best Memorials (win number)	Spirit of LAWASIA (win number)	Best Endeavour (win number)	International debut
2005	Gold Coast	7	University of Hong Kong (1)	University of Western Australia (1)	NA	NA	NA	NA	* Hidayatullah National Law University * Huazhong University of Science and Technology * International Islamic University of Malaysia * Sri Lanka National Law College * University of Hong Kong * University of Malaya * University of Western Australia
2006	NA	NA	NA	NA	NA	NA	NA	NA	NA
2007	Hong Kong	11	University of Hong Kong (2)	Taylor's University (1)	University of Hong Kong (1)	NA	NA	NA	* Ateneo Law School * Kathmandu Law School * Konkuk University * Moscow State University * National Law School of India University * Taylor's University * Tsinghua University * University of Jammu * Universiti Teknologi MARA
2008	Kuala Lumpur	9	University of Hong Kong (3)	University of the Philippines (1)	University of the Philippines (1)	Universiti Kebangsaan Malaysia (1)	University of the Philippines (1)	National Law School of India University (1)	* Loyola Law School * National Law University, Delhi * National University of Singapore * Universiti Kebangsaan Malaysia * University of the Philippines
2009	Ho Chi Minh City	30	Advance Teritiary College (1)	Singapore Management University (1)	University of Queensland (1)	Advance Tertiary College (1)	Ho Chi Minh City University of Law (1)	Ho Chi Minh City University of Law (1)	* Advance Tertiary College * Chinese University of Hong Kong * City University of Hong Kong * Diplomatic Academy of Vietnam * Edith Cowan University * Handong International Law School * Ho Chi Minh City University of Law * Pusan National University * Singapore Management University * University of the Philippines Diliman * University of Queensland
2010	New Delhi	26	National Law University, Delhi (1)	Advance Tertiary College (1)	Advance Tertiary College of Malaysia (1)	BPP Law School (1)	Ho Chi Minh City University of Law (2)	Kathmandu Law School (1)	* BPP Law School * Rajiv Gandhi School of Intellectual Property Law
2011	Seoul	40	Advance Tertiary College of Malaysia (2)	Singapore Management University (2)	Advance Tertiary College of Malaysia (2)	Chinese University of Hong Kong (1)	Pusan National University (1)	Kobe University (1)	* Chung-Ang University * Hanyang University * Kobe University * National Law University, Jodhpur * San Beda College of Law
2012	Bali	37	Chinese University of Hong Kong (1)	Singapore Management University (3)	Loyola Law School (1)	Chinese University of Hong Kong (2)/Universiti Kebangsaan Malaysia (2)	Ho Chi Minh City University of Law (3)	Tsinghua University (1)	NA
2013	Singapore	23	Singapore Management University (1)	Taylor's University (2)	Singapore Management University (1)	Loyola Law School (1)	Singapore Management University (1)	Ho Chi Minh City University of Law (2)	NA
2014	Bangkok	33	Singapore Management University (2)	Chinese University of Hong Kong (1)	Singapore Management University (2)	INTI International University (1)	Monash University (1)	Hidayatullah National Law University (1)	* INTI International University * Kyoto University * Monash University
2015	Sydney	37	Advance Tertiary College of Malaysia (3)	National Law University, Jodhpur (1)	Singapore Management University (3)	Advance Tertiary College of Malaysia (2)	Universiti Teknologi MARA (1)	Kyoto University (1)	* Chulalongkorn University * National University of Juridical Sciences * Shanghai University of Political Science and Law * University of Kent
2016	Colombo	28	Singapore Management University (3)	National University of Juridical Sciences (1)	Chulalongkorn University (1)	Singapore Management University (1)	Horizon Campus (1)	Chulalongkorn University (1)	* General Sir John Kotelawala Defence University * Horizon Campus * University College Lahore * University of Peradeniya
2017	Tokyo	37	Singapore Management University (4)	Universiti Teknologi MARA (1)	Universiti Teknologi MARA (1)	Singapore Management University (2)	Sophia University (1)	Kobe University (2)	* Sophia University
2018	Siem Reap	31	University of Malaya (1)	National University of Singapore (1)	National University of Singapore (1)	Universiti Teknologi MARA (1)	University of Kent (1)	Kobe University (3)	NA
2019	Hong Kong	9	University of Malaya (2)	National University of Singapore (2)	Advance Tertiary College of Malaysia (3)	Singapore Management University (3)	National University of Singapore (1)	CTBC Business School (1)	* CTBC Business School * Hong Kong Shue Yan University
2020	Mongolia (online)	17	Singapore Management University (5)	National University of Singapore (3)	Singapore Management University (4)	NA	NA	NA	NA
2021	Kuala Lumpur (online)	15	National University of Singapore (1)	University of Malaya (1)	National University of Singapore (2)	NA	NA	NA	* American International University-Bangladesh * National University of Management
2022	Sydney	22	University of Malaya (3)	Singapore Management University (4)	University of Malaya (1)	NA	NA	NA	* Sindh Muslim Law College
2023	Bengaluru	20	University of Malaya (4)	Singapore Management University (5)	Singapore Management University (5)	Singapore Management University (4)	Diplomatic Academy of Vietnam (1)	National University of Management (1)	* Ramaiah College of Law
2024	Kuala Lumpur	30							
2025	Hanoi	27	National Law University, Jodhpur (1)	Hanoi Law University (1)					
2026	Seoul	12	Taylor's University (1)	University of Malaya (2)	Singapore Management University (6)				
