= Hong Kong Red Cross International Humanitarian Law Moot =

Annual pleading competition

- Established: 2003 (2004 for international rounds)
- Venue: Hong Kong
- Subject matter: International humanitarian law
- Class: Regional
- Record participation: 120 teams (2019)
- Qualification: National/regional rounds
- Most championships: Victoria University of Wellington (3; 1 online)
- Website: https://www.redcross.org.hk/en/ihl-moot.html

The Hong Kong Red Cross International Humanitarian Law Moot is an annual international moot court competition organised by the Hong Kong Red Cross and International Committee of the Red Cross in collaboration with universities in Hong Kong. It is an inter-university competition on international humanitarian law for law schools in the Asia-Pacific region (Asia, Australia, and New Zealand).

The moot, which is hosted in Hong Kong, started as a local moot in 2003 before becoming a regional moot the next year. In recent times more than 100 law schools have participated in the local and regional rounds each year, with the top 20-odd teams making it to the international rounds. Counsel need to prepare written and oral submissions for both sides (Prosecutor and Defendant) before a mock International Criminal Court. For the 2020 edition, owing to travel restrictions brought about by Covid-19, the tournament winner was adjudged by memorials only. As the restrictions persisted in some countries, the 2021 and 2022 editions adopted the online format for the oral rounds.

== Competition records ==
Year	Champion	Runner-up	Semi-finalists	Quarter-finalists (since 2013) or Top 5 Side (before 2013)	Best Oralist	Best Prosecutor Memorial	Best Defendant Memorial	Best Memorials	International debut
2025	Singapore Management University	University of Adelaide	China University of Political Science and Law		Ritsumeikan Asia Pacific University	University of Petroleum & Energy Studies	University of Adelaide	NA	
2024	University of San Agustin	Thammasat University			University of Adelaide	Tribhuvan University			
2023	University of Adelaide	University of Auckland	* Singapore Management University		* 1st: Singapore Management University * 2nd: Gadjah Mada University * 3rd: Singapore Management University	Brickfields Asia College	Singapore Management University	NA	* Brickfields Asia College
2022 (online)	Singapore Management University	Gadjah Mada University	* Victoria University of Wellington	* International Islamic University Malaysia * University of Hong Kong * The University of New South Wales * University of San Agustin * University of Tokyo	* 1st: Gadjah Mada University * 2nd: University of San Agustin * 3rd: University of San Agustin	* 1st: University of Hong Kong * 2nd: Eastern University * 3rd: Jilin University * 3rd: University of San Agustin * 3rd: Tongji University	* 1st: The Chinese University of Hong Kong * 1st: Chulalongkorn University * 2nd: National Taiwan University * 3rd: University of New South Wales	NA	* University of San Agustin
2021 (online)	Victoria University of Wellington	University of Tokyo	* University of the Philippines	* Singapore Management University * Royal University of Law and Economics * University of Hong Kong	Victoria University of Wellington	University of the Philippines	National Taiwan University	NA	
2020	NA	NA	NA	NA	NA	* 1st: University of Adelaide * 2nd: Kathmandu Law School * 3rd University of the Philippines	* 1st: Symbiosis International University * 2nd: Singapore Management University * 3rd: University of Colombo	NA	NA
2019	Peking University	Singapore Management University	* Multimedia University * University of the Chinese Academy of Sciences	* National University of Mongolia * University of Colombo * University of Hong Kong * University of Tasmania	* 1st: Singapore Management University * 2nd: Kathmandu Law School * 3rd: Singapore Management University	* 1st: Singapore Management University * 2nd: Diplomatic Academy of Vietnam * 3rd: Kathmandu School Of Law	* 1st: University of Colombo * 2nd: Singapore Management University * 3rd: Diplomatic Academy of Vietnam	NA	
2018	Gujarat National Law University	University of New South Wales	* Singapore Management University * University of Auckland	* Nirma University * University of Colombo * University of Hong Kong * University of the Philippines	* 1st: University of New South Wales * 2nd: Gujarat National Law University * 3rd: University of Hong Kong	* 1st: Gujarat National Law University * 2nd: Peking University * 3rd: National University of Mongolia	* 1st: University of Auckland * 2nd: Gujarat National Law University * 3rd: Singapore Management University * 3rd: University of Hong Kong	NA	
2017	Bond University	University of Hong Kong			* 1st: National Taiwan University * 2nd: University of Auckland * 3rd: Peking University	* 1st: The Chinese University of Hong Kong * 2nd: University of Auckland * 3rd: National Law School of India University	* 1st: National Taiwan University * 2nd: Peking University * 3rd: University of Auckland	NA	
2016	Queensland University of Technology	Singapore Management University	* Shahid Beheshti University * University of Malaya	* The Chinese University of Hong Kong * Diplomatic Academy of Vietnam * Universitas Indonesia * Victoria University of Wellington	* 1st: Queensland University of Technology * 2nd: Victoria University of Wellington * 3rd: Queensland University of Technology	* 1st: The Chinese University of Hong Kong; *2nd: University of Malaya * 3rd: Diplomatic Academy of Vietnam	* 1st: Universitas Pelita Harapan * 2nd: University of Dhaka * 3rd: Ateneo Law School * 3rd: Doshisha University * 3rd: Thammasat University * 3rd: Shahid Beheshti University	NA	
2015	Victoria University of Wellington	University of Hong Kong		* Singapore Management University * Universitas Indonesia		* 2nd: Soochow University		NA	
2014	University of Adelaide	National Law University, Jodhpur	* Chinese University of Hong Kong * Singapore Management University-National University of Singapore	* Ho Chi Minh City University of Law * Kathmandu Law School * KDU University College * Shanghai Jiao Tong University	* 1st: Singapore Management University-National University of Singapore * 2nd: Singapore Management University-National University of Singapore * 3rd: University of Jaffna	* 1st: National Law University, Jodhpur * 2nd: University of Adelaide * 3rd: Thammasat University	* 1st: University of Adelaide * 2nd: Shanghai Jiao Tong University * 3rd: Singapore Management University-National University of Singapore	NA	
2013	National Law University, Delhi	Australian National University	* Pakistan College of Law * Singapore Management University-National University of Singapore	* Hopkins-Nanjing Center * University of Auckland * University of Malaya * University of St La Salle	* 1st: National Law University, Delhi * 2nd: University of Auckland * 3rd: University of St La Salle	* 1st: Australian National University * 2nd: University of St La Salle * 3rd: Universitas Pelita Harapan	* 1st: Peking University * 2nd: University of St La Salle * 3rd: Pakistan College of Law	NA	
2012	University of Hong Kong	University of Melbourne	* Chinese University of Hong Kong * University of Cebu	* City University of Hong Kong * Nankai University * Singapore Management University-National University of Singapore * University of Colombo * Victoria University of Wellington * Xiamen University	* 1st: University of Hong Kong * 2nd: Singapore Management University-National University of Singapore * 3rd: Chinese University of Hong Kong	NA	NA	* 1st: Victoria University of Wellington * 2nd: Nankai University * 3rd: National Chengchi University	
2011	Victoria University of Wellington	Hidayatullah National Law University	* Australian National University * Gadjah Mada University * Singapore Management University-National University of Singapore * University of Hong Kong	NA	* 1st: Gadjah Mada University * 2nd: Victoria University of Wellington * 3rd: Victoria University of Wellington	NA	NA	* 1st: Gadjah Mada University * 2nd: Victoria University of Wellington * 3rd: Sungkyunkwan University	* Singapore Management University-National University of Singapore
2010	University of Hong Kong	Universiti Utara Malaysia	* Tamil Nadu Dr Ambedkar Law University * Victoria University of Wellington	* Ateneo Law School * City University of Hong Kong * Kyoto University * Singapore Management University * Soochow University * Universitas Indonesia	* 1st: University of Hong Kong * 2nd: Ateneo Law School * 3rd: University of Hong Kong	NA	NA	* 1st: Universiti Utara Malaysia * 1st: Victoria University of Wellington * 2nd: Tamil Nadu Dr Ambedkar Law University * 3rd: City University of Hong Kong * 3rd: Singapore Management University	* Singapore Management University
2009	Universitas Indonesia	Gujarat National Law University	* University of Adelaide *	* China University of Political Science and Law * National Taiwan University * Xiamen University * * *	* 1st: University of the Philippines * 2nd: University of the Philippines * 3rd: University of Adelaide	NA	NA	* 1st: Gujarat National University * 2nd: Universitas Indonesia * 3rd: University of Hong Kong	
2008	National University of Singapore	Multimedia University			* 1st: Chulalongkorn University * 2nd: National University of Singapore	NA	NA	Chinese University of Hong Kong	
2007	University of Sydney	University of Hong Kong	NA	NA	* 1st: University of Sydney * 2nd: University of Sydney			University of Sydney	* China University of Political Science and Law
2006	University of Queensland	University of Hong Kong		* Ateneo Law School * City University of Hong Kong * National University of Singapore	* 1st: University of Hong Kong * 2nd: University of Queensland	NA	NA	University of Queensland	* University of Queensland
2005	University of the Philippines								* University of the Philippines
2004	National University of Singapore	University of Hong Kong	NA	NA	National University of Singapore	NA	NA	Ateneo Law School	* Ateneo Law School * National University of Singapore
2003 (local round only)	University of Hong Kong				University of Hong Kong				* University of Hong Kong

== See also ==
- Australian Law Students Association
- Jean Pictet IHL Competition
