= UniSZA F.C. =

Football club in Malaysia

Unisza
- Full name: Universiti Sultan Zainal Abidin Football Club
- Founded: 2013; 12 years ago
- Ground: Unisza
- Capacity: 500
- Owner: Universiti Sultan Zainal Abidin, Terengganu
- League: Malaysia IPT League

Universiti Sultan Zainal Abidin Football Club or Unisza FC is a Universiti football club based in Gong Badak, Terengganu, Malaysia. Founded in 2013, the club's home ground has always been in the UniSZA in Gong Badak, Terengganu. The club represents the Universiti Sultan Zainal Abidin in Malaysian football competitions.

== History ==
Universiti Sultan Zainal Abidin Football Club was founded in 2013. The club compete in Malaysia IPT Football League and has been a winner of multiple college football competitions.

== Stadium ==
The club's home ground is the Universiti Sultan Zainal Abidin, Gong Badak Campus in Kuala Terengganu.

== Ownership and finances ==
UNISZA F.C. is owned by the Universiti Sultan Zainal Abidin.
