= Hidayatullah National Law University =

Public school and university in New Raipur, Chhattisgarh, India

- Motto: Dharma Sansthapanartham
- Motto in English: For the sake of establishing the primacy of the laws of eternal value.
- Type: National Law University
- Established: 2003; 23 years ago
- Affiliations: UGC, BCI
- Chancellor: Chief Justice of Chhattisgarh High Court
- Vice-Chancellor: V. C. Vivekanandan
- Location: opposite Jungle Safari, Sector 40, Uparwara, Atal Nagar-Nava Raipur, Chhattisgarh 493661, Naya Raipur, Chhattisgarh, 493661, India; 21.107°N 81.759°E
- Website: www.hnlu.ac.in

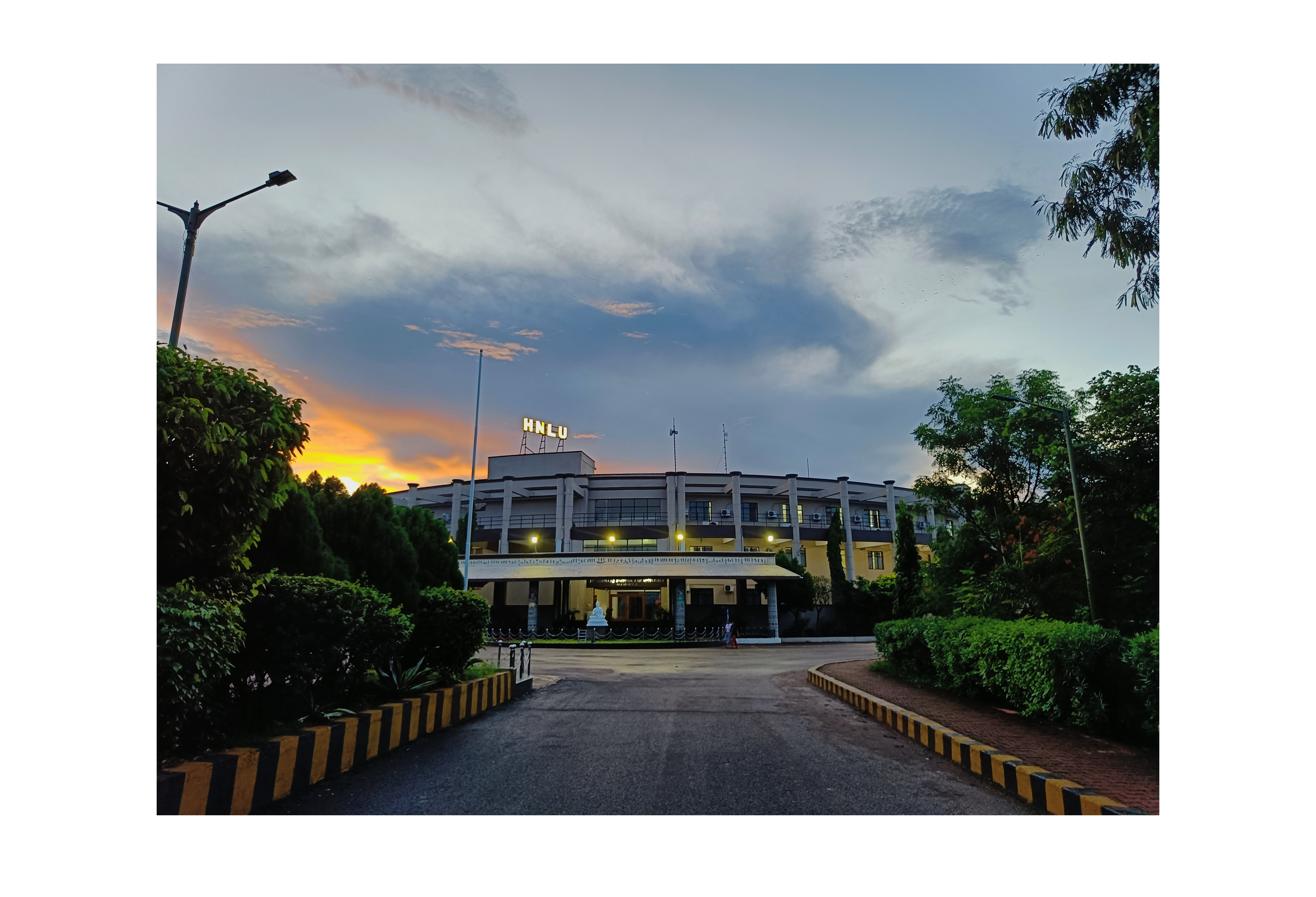
Academic block of HNLU

Hidayatullah National Law University (HNLU) is a public law school and a National Law University located in New Raipur, Chhattisgarh, India. It was named after the former Chief Justice of India, Mohammad Hidayatullah. It is one of the autonomous law schools in India and seventh in the series of such national law schools. It was established as a centre for legal excellence by the Government of Chhattisgarh under the Hidayatullah National University of Law, Chhattisgarh Act (Act No.10 of 2003). The university offers a B.A. LL.B. (Hons.) integrated Program, an L.L.M. Program, and a PhD Course.

It is a residential university and receives central assistance from the University Grants Commission and recognized by the Bar Council of India.

== Campus ==
=== Old campus ===
Previously, the university operated from a classical heritage building adjacent to the Raj Bhawan in the heart of the city. In 2009, the university shifted to its newly constructed campus at Upparwara, Nava Raipur, about 22 km from the center of Raipur city.

=== New campus ===
The new campus is built over 65 acres (26 ha) of land beside a lake and in a serene and pollution-free environment. The circular academic and administrative building has been built on the design of the Parliament of India. The academic block consists of a two-storied library with an air-conditioned reading hall, The academic block also houses the Moot Court Halls designed to match the standards of the Supreme Court of India and the High Courts. The campus is Wi-Fi enabled. There are 21 air-conditioned classrooms fitted with modern teaching aids and equipment.

The air-conditioned classrooms are fitted with teaching aids such as DLP projectors. It also has a conference hall and an amphitheater. The halls of residence at the new campus have been constructed to provide single-room accommodation to each student. However, the later construction of the new hostels for both girls and boys are double occupancy.

=== Infrastructure ===
==== Hostels ====
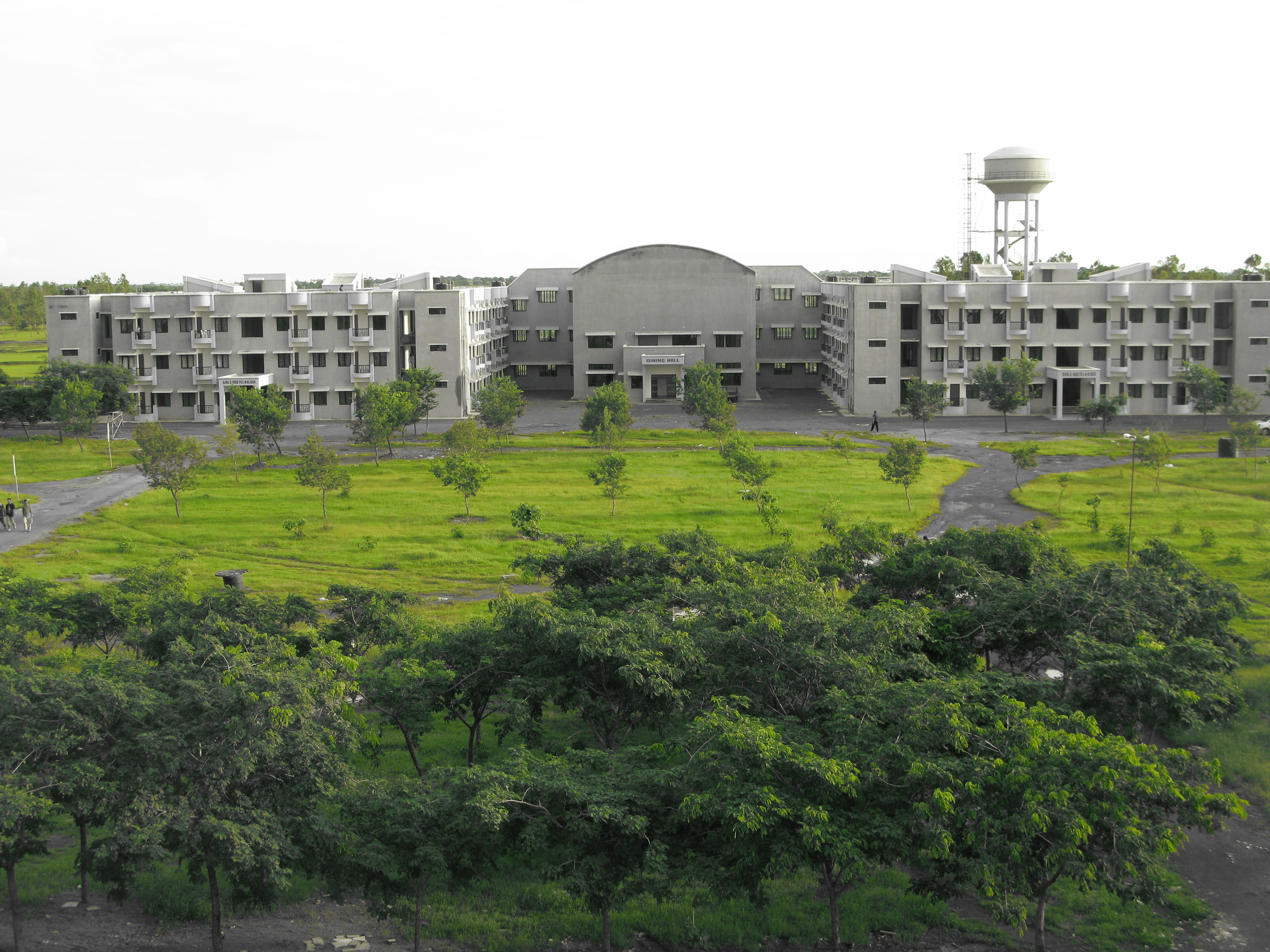
Residence Halls

HNLU provides separate hostels for girls and boys. Each hostel has three blocks which are connected to the mess. There are over 400 single occupancy rooms and 216 double occupancy rooms. The hostels are equipped with separate mess and gymnasium facilities with a resident doctor.

==== Academic block and guest house ====
In 2013 the university began construction on a second academic block adjacent to the original one, with classrooms built to accommodate the additional students after intake was increased from 100 to 175.

A guest house has been built where parents of students and guests are accommodated. The lake facing guest house has air-conditioned rooms which are available at a nominal fee on application to the registrar.

==== Hostel block and auditorium ====
Construction began in 2014 for the new hostel blocks for both the boys' and girls' hostels. The new hostels are twin-sharing, contrary to the old single rooms. The Chhattisgarh Government also allotted a major budget in 2014 for the construction of a state-of-the-art auditorium.

== Administration ==
Heading the administration of the university are:

- Visitor: Hon'ble Mr. Justice C.T. Ravikumar Judge, Supreme Court of India
- Chancellor: Hon'ble Shri Justice Ramesh Sinha, Chief Justice of the High Court of Chhattisgarh.
- Vice Chancellor: Prof. Dr. VC Vivekanandan
- Registrar: Dr. Vipan Kumar (I/c)

== Academics ==
=== Admission ===
Admissions to undergraduate and postgraduate courses is made on the basis of merit as assessed through the Common Law Admission Test (CLAT). Prior to 2008, admissions were conducted through National Entrance Tests which was replaced by the CLAT as per the Supreme Court of India's directives. Admissions to the PhD Program is conducted separately by the university. Students belonging to the state domicile Scheduled Castes and Scheduled Tribes and Other Backward Class, and PWD and minorities are provided with scholarships by the state government.

==== Common Law Admission Test ====
HNLU conducted the Common Law Admission Test (CLAT) in 2013 & in 2022. The CLAT is conducted for admission into various academic programs (LLB and LLM) of the 24 National Law Universities (NLUs) in India.

=== Courses and curriculum ===
HNLU currently offers following courses:

- BA, LL.B (Hons.) - Integrated Undergraduate Law Degree Program (5 years)
- LL.M - Master of Laws - Postgraduate Program (1 year)
- PhD

==== Undergraduate ====
The university follows a semester system in its undergraduate program, with the students studying a total of 56 papers in 5 years. The university earlier had a system of students declaring a major (Political Science, Sociology or Economics), but it currently offers a single major, Political Science. In the 4th and 5th year, students have to choose two honors papers. All students are also required to study six optional papers during their 4th and 5th year.

==== Postgraduate ====
The university offers a one-year LL.M Program which runs according to a trimester system. The specializations offered are corporate law, intellectual property law and environmental law.

=== Publications ===
HNLU Student Bar Journal is the flagship peer review journal of the Students Bar Association of HNLU. In 2014 the university started the HNLU Journal of Law & Social Sciences (ISSN No. 2347-839X), a multidisciplinary peer-reviewed journal with an editorial board of experts on law as well as the field of social sciences. This bi-annual journal is being published with the objective to provide a platform to judges, jurists, academics, research scholars and legal practitioners to express their views on topics of contemporary significance in law and social sciences.

=== Rankings ===
University rankings

Law – India
- Government colleges
- Outlook India (2022): 9

Hidayatullah National Law University was ranked ninth in India by Outlook India's "Top 13 Government Law Institutes In India" of 2022".

=== Academic achievements ===
The students of the university have won various awards and accolades. In 2012 the Supreme Court Lawyers Welfare Trust, awarded its first annual fellowship, named "The Lawyers Welfare Award" to HNLU alumnus Pallav Mongia.

An alumnus of the 2012 graduating batch, Saksham Chaturvedi won the ABA Section of International Law's Rona R. Mears Student Writing Competition and Scholarship Award, 2011 for his essay on "The Geneva Conventions: What Past? What futures?" and was awarded the prize in an event hosted by the American Bar Association in Washington

== Student life ==
=== Student Bar Association ===
The Student Bar Association at HNLU is the representative body of the students. The Association comprises fourteen students who are the conveners of the twelve committees of the university. A president and a vice-president are elected from amongst these fourteen members. The members and officers of the Association hold office for a year. The Association makes all decisions affecting the students and makes recommendations to the Vice-Chancellor. The Association coordinates and supervises the activities of all the committees at the university.

The HNLU Students Bar Association consists of fourteen committees: Moot Court Co-ordination Committee, Academic Support Committee, Finance Committee, Legal Service Society, Literary and Debate Society, Library Committee, I.T. Committee, Public Relations Committee, Disciplinary Committee, Mess Committee, Halls of Residence Committee, Cultural Committee, Students Editorial Board and Sports Committee. Each has a convener and co-convener, and at least two faculty advisers. The President and Vice President of the Student Bar Council are elected by popular vote.

=== International Law Students Association ===
The HNLU ILSA Chapter was established on 11 October 2010, with Aakansha Kumar as its Chief Officer and Shilpa Jain and Neeraj Tiwari as Faculty Advisers. Through the years the Chapter has tried to forward the study on International Law in HNLU through various initiatives, including a two-day Lecture Series by Prof. David Ambrose from the University of Madras and the HNLU-ILSA Refugee Conference.

=== Moot courts ===
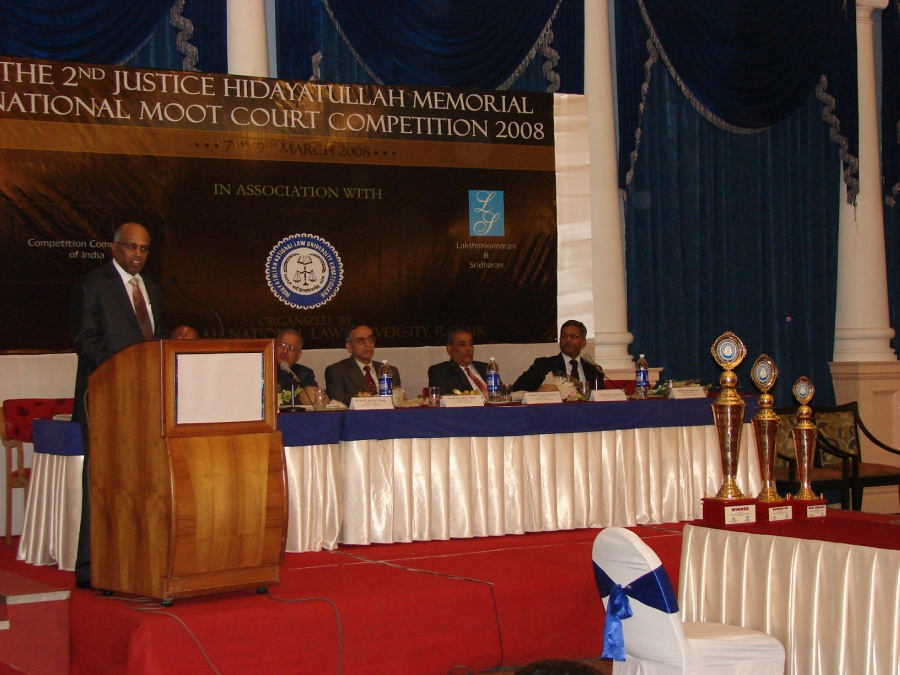
2nd Justice Hidayatullah Memorial National Moot Court Competition

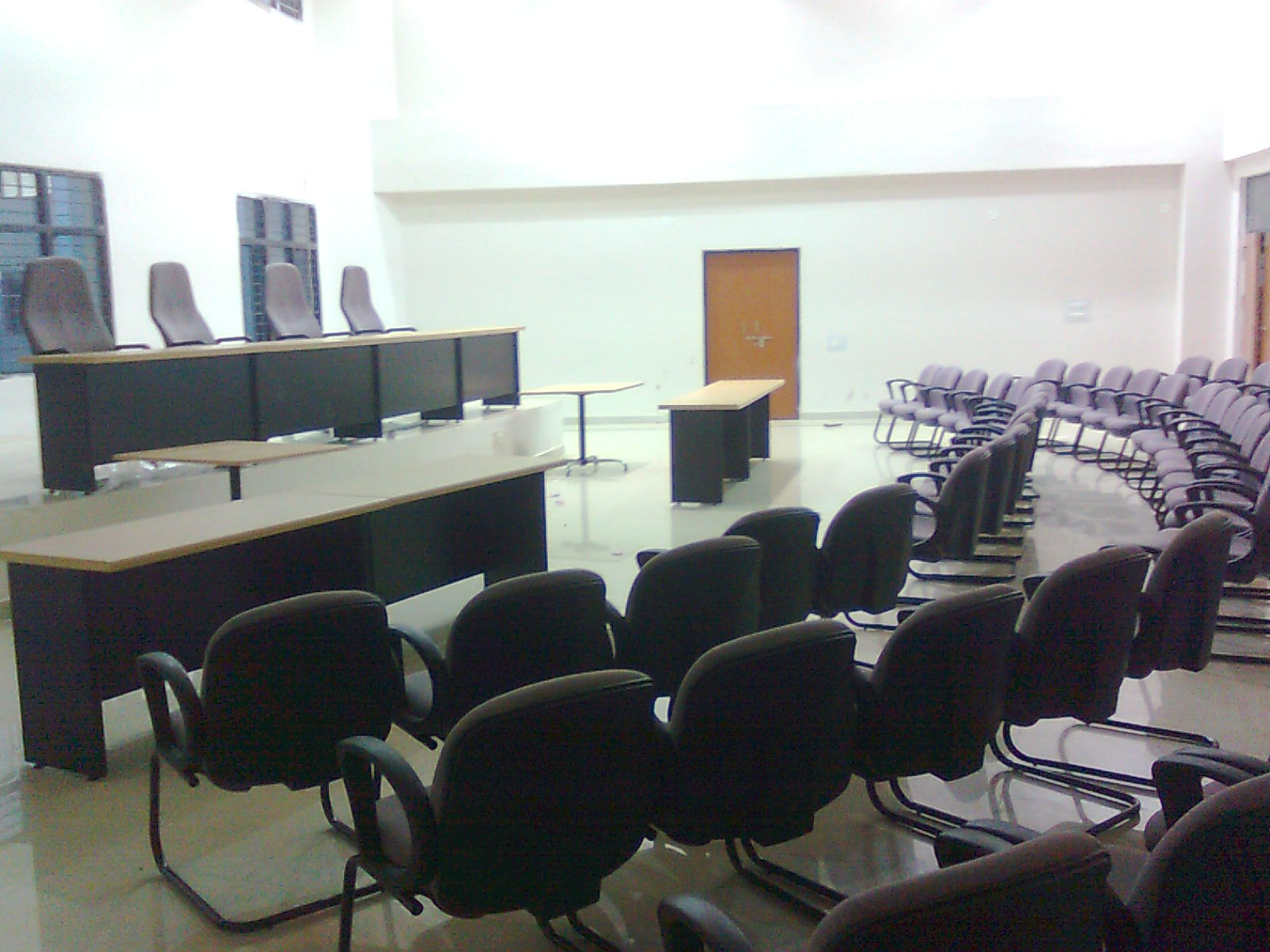
HNLU Moot Court Hall

To familiarize students with the workings of courts, the university conducts courtroom exercises and moot courts. Courtroom exercises are conducted in every semester. Students are encouraged to participate in moot court competitions so that they get the chance to interact with other law students from all over the country. The Moot Court Committee is the facilitator of the moot court. The committee is guided by the faculty coordinator and three faculty advisers.

==== Justice Hidayatullah National Moot Court Competition ====
HNLU organizes its flagship moot the Justice Hidayatullah Memorial National Moot Court Competition every year in March, in which teams from across the country participate. The Moot sees participation from across the country, with the Judges of the Chhattisgarh High Court officiating over the finals. The competition has been previously sponsored by the Competition Commission of India and renowned law firms such as Khaitan & Co., J. Sagar & Associates, and Sai Krishna & Associates. The 1st Edition of the Moot in 2007 was based on Biotechnology Law, the subsequent editions being based on Competition law (in association with the Competition Commission of India). The 7th edition of the Competition in 2014 saw the theme being changed from to Environmental law. HNMCC is listed as a tier 5 Moot in the Mooting Premier League.

Edition	Year	Winner	Runner-up	Best Speaker
2nd	2008	ILS Law College, Pune	National Law University, Jodhpur	
3rd	2010	National Law University, Delhi	Campus Law Centre, Delhi	Aditya Singha (NLU, Delhi)
4th	2011	National Law University, Jodhpur	West Bengal National University of Juridical Sciences, Kolkata	Vishal Sagar (NLU Jodhpur)
5th	2012	West Bengal National University Juridical Sciences, Kolkata	Nalsar University of Law, Hyderabad	Akshat Gupta (WBNUJS, Kolkata)
6th	2013	National Law School of India University, Bengaluru	Nalsar University of Law, Hyderabad	Pranav Agarwal (NALSAR, Hyderabad)
7th	2014	SASTRA University, Thanjavur	Symbiosis Law School, Noida	Siddhanth Kocchar (UPES Dehradun)

==== Achievements ====
HNLU has represented India in some of the International Moot Court Competitions like the Manfred Lachs Space Law Moot Court Competition; International Maritime Moot Court Competition, Sydney, the LAWASIA Moot, the Inter-American Human Rights Moot Court Competition at the Washington College of Law, the FDI Moot, Louis M. Brown Client Counseling Competition, Susan J. Ferrell Intercultural Human Rights Moot Court Competition held at St. Thomas University - School of Law, Miami, and the Philip C. Jessup Moot Court Competition.

International

- 17th Foreign Direct Investment International Arbitration Moot, 2024 (World Rounds): Ranked among the top 4 teams in the global oral rounds.
- Philip C. Jessup Moot Court Competition 2022 (World Rounds): Hardy C. Dillard Award for the Best Combined Memorial in the World (Rank 2) & Alona E. Evans Award for Best Memorial at International Rounds (Rank 5).
- Manfred Lachs Space Law Moot Competition, Sydney, Australia, 2005: Won the Best Oralist Award (preliminary rounds) at the competition conducted by the International Institute of Space Law. The team was a semi-finalist and was the only Indian team that advanced to the semi-finals.
- Hong Kong Red Cross International Humanitarian Law Moot (Sub-continent Rounds), 2010: The team which qualified for the National Rounds through the Henry Dunant Moot Court Competition, won the Sub-continent rounds of the International Red Cross Moot Court Competition and qualified for the International Rounds in 2011.
- Hong Kong Red Cross International Humanitarian Law Moot (International Round), 2011: The team qualified for the World Finals and went on to secure the Runners-up position.
- Asia-Pacific Rounds of Manfred Lachs International Space Law Moot Competition, 2011: Won the Best Memorandum Award.
- Represented India at the World Rounds of Philip C. Jessup International Law Moot Court Competition after being Runner's Up at the North India Rounds of 2012 event in January 2012.
- 3rd International ADR Mooting Competition, 2012 held at the City University of Hong Kong: Won Runner up Memoranda.
- 4th International ADR Mooting Competition, 2013 held at the City University of Hong Kong: Won the Best Team in Mediation, and stood overall Runner-up.
- 9th Susan J. Ferrell Intercultural Human Rights Moot Court Competition, 2014 held at St. Thomas University - School of Law, Miami: The Team was adjudged Runner-up and also awarded the Best Memorial Prize.
- 9th LAWASIA Moot, 2014: The team was awarded the Best Endeavor Award.
- IASLA Space Law Moot Court Competition (Asia-Pacific Rounds), 2014 held at Sydney, Australia: Team was awarded the Best Memorials Prize.
- 11th William C. Vis International Commercial Arbitration Moot, 2014 held at Hong Kong: Semi-Finalists Pan-Asian Award.

National

- Philip C. Jessup Moot Court Competition 2022 (India Qualifying Rounds): Quarter Finalists (Qualified for World Rounds) & Best Memorial Award.
- K.L.E. Society's League of Mooters Moot Court Competition, 2005 : Runners' Up and Best Memorial Award.
- 10th All India Moot Court Competition, 2005 held at the University Law College, Bangalore : Adjudged Runner's Up.
- "Jus Amicus" National Moot Court Competition, 2007, Bharathi Vidyapeeth, Pune: Adjudged Runners Up and Best Lady Advocate.
- Stetson International Environmental Moot Court Competition (North-India Rounds), 2009: Best Orator Prize.
- The NLIU-Juris Corp Corporate Law National Moot 2010 held at NLIU Bhopal - Winners.
- Henry Dunant India Rounds-2010: Winner and qualified for the Sub-Continent rounds.
- Bar Council of India International Law Moot Court Competition, 2011: Best Female Oralist.
- NALSAR - NFCG Corporate Governance Moot Court Competition, 2011: Runner-up, Best Speaker Prize.
- ULC Bangalore All India Moot Court Competition, 2011: Best Memorial and Best Researcher Awards.
- Monroe E. Price Media Law National Moot Qualifier Competition held at NLU, Delhi: 3rd Best Team and qualified to represent India at the Oxford Monroe E. Price Media Law International Moot to be held at Oxford University in March 2011.
- Nani Palkhiwala Tax Moot Court Competition, 2011: Awarded Best Speaker Prize.
- Philip C. Jessups Moot Court Competition (North India), 2012: Second Best Team and 4th Best Memorial.
- 1st D.H. Law National Moot Court Competition, 2012 held at CNLU, Patna: Adjudged Winners.
- Surana and Surana National Trial Advocacy Moot, 2012 (North Eastern Rounds): Winner, Best Advocate, Second Best Advocate, Second Best Memorials and Best Speaker in the Finals.
- 4th Rizvi Law College Saqib Rizvi Memorial Moot, 2012: Adjudged Runner-up.
- 9th Nani Palkhiwala Tax Moot, 2012: Best Researcher Prize.
- 17th Stetson International Environmental Moot Court Competition, 2012 (North India rounds): Best Memorial Award.
- 6th Pro Bono Moot Court Competition 2012 held at SOEL, Chennai: Runner's up, Best Memorial, Best Speaker and Best Researcher award.
- 15th S.C. Javali Memorial National Moot Court Competition, 2012 organized by Karnatak University's Sir Siddappa Kambali Law College, Dharwad: Adjudged Runner-up.
- KK Luthra Memorial Criminal Law Moot, 2013: Best Memorials Prize.
- 1st NLS - TIOL Tax Law Moot, 2013 held at National Law School of India University, Bangalore: Adjudged Winners
- Surana and Surana Trial Advocacy Moot, 2013 (North Eastern Rounds): Winner, Second Best Memorials and Third Best Speaker
- Army Institute of Law National Moot Court Competition, 2013: Adjudged Winners
- 3rd Paras Diwan Memorial National Moot Court Competition, 2013 organized by UPES, Dehradun: Adjudged Winners.
- ITMU Moot Court Competition, 2013: Adjudged Winners.
- 2nd KIIT University Moot Court Competition, 2014 held at KIIT University, Bhubaneshwar: Adjudged Winner, Best Speaker.
- 8th Justice Bodh Raj Sawhney Memorial Moot Court Competition, 2014 held at NALSAR, Hyderabad: Adjudged Winner.
- 5th NLIU Juris-Corp Moot Court Competition, 2014 held at NLIU, Bhopal: Adjudged Runner-up.
- Surana and Surana Trial Advocacy Moot, 2014 (North Eastern Rounds): Adjudged Winners, Best Advocate Prize.
- Dr. B.P. Saraf National Tax Moot Court Competition, 2014 held at NUJS, Kolkata: Adjudged Runner-up.

=== Events ===
==== Colossus ====
Colossus is the flagship sports fest of HNLU which is organized in March every year. The fest was first organized in 2013 and comprises 15 sports events and an equal number of cultural events. The sports events include football, cricket, tennis, table tennis, basketball, throw-ball, volleyball, and chess. The cultural events include a dance contest, singing competitions, fashion show, photography competition, and Mad-ads. The fest initially began with participation from local universities and colleges in Chhattisgarh such as NIT Raipur, BIT Raipur, MATS University, PIE Tech Raipur, APIC, and CIT.

The second edition in 2014 saw additions like classical dance, solo singing and street plays. Participants included Sastra University, Thanjavur, National Law Institute University, Bhopal, University Law College, Bhubaneshwar and Gujarat National Law University, Gandhinagar.

==== Literary and debating ====
The university has an active debating circuit which is supported by the Literary & Debating Committee. The university teams selected on the basis of challengers or benchmarks participate in Parliamentary debates across the country including the National Law School Debate, the Mukarji Memorial Debate at St. Stephen's College, Delhi, the NALSAR IV and the NUJS Parliamentary Debate at WBNUJS, Kolkata.

Year round activities held on the campus include:

- The Aruna Hyde Memorial Debate: A parliamentary debate held by the L&D Committee and named after the late Aruna Hyde, Faculty of English.
- Literary & Debating Week: Activities include debates, one act plays, Scrabble competitions, quiz contests, and the Hindi Debate.
- The Republic Day Debate: It is an annual tradition to hold a debate on a relevant social issue on Republic Day.
- The India Quiz & Debating Premier League: DPL started in 2014, as a debating equivalent of the IPL, where investors buy teams which are pitted against each other.
- Freshers Debate: The inaugural edition was held in 2013, meant for the first-year students of the university.

==== Intra-university sporting events ====
The university has an endowment cricket tournament, the Sudeep Memorial Cricket Tournament, named after an alumnus. There is an annual football tournament held in the university known as the Hidayatullah Premier League (HPL). A basketball tournament, Dunkyard, has also been held since 2013.
