= Trade, Law and Development =

Trade, Law and Development (TL&D)
- Discipline: Law review
- Language: English

Publication details
- History: 2009 - present
- Publisher: National Law University, Jodhpur (India)
- Frequency: Biannual
- Open access: Yes

Standard abbreviations
- ISO 4: Trade Law Dev.

Indexing
- ISSN: 0976-2329 (print); 0975-3346 (web)

Links
- Journal homepage

Trade, Law and Development (TL&D) is a biannual, student-run, academic journal published by National Law University, Jodhpur, India (NLU, Jodhpur). It provides a medium for exchanging ideas and constructive debates about legal and policy issues surrounding world trade, cross-border investment and development, among other inter-related aspects of international law. The main focus areas of the Journal is international trade law and international economic law. It was founded in 2009 by Shashank P. Kumar, an alumnus of NLU, Jodhpur.

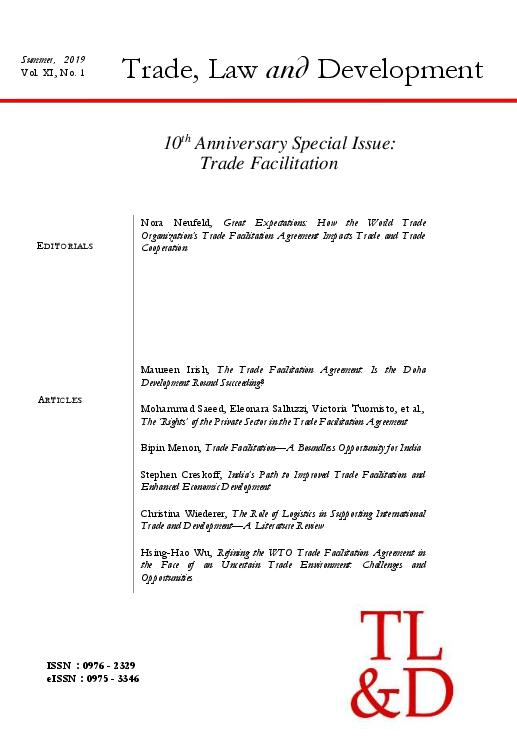
TL&D Anniversary Special Issue on Trade Facilitation, which is one of the very few authoritative publications on the subject.

TL&D is publishes two issues each year – one in the summer, and one in the winter. While the general (winter issue) has no specific theme, the special issue (summer issue) is a relatively under-explored topic or issue of contemporary relevance to the world. Previous special issues have covered areas such as "Trade Facilitation Agreement" (2019), "Revisiting WTO's Role in Global Governance" (2018), "Recent Regionalism" (2017), "Trade and Public Health" (2016) and "Government Procurement" (2015), inter alia. The 2020 special issue is dedicated to "Trade in Services". The 2019 special issue on "Trade Facilitation Agreement" is one of the very few authoritative publications on the subject. Further, the 2020 summer special issue is on the dynamic field of Trade in Services.

The Journal includes: "Articles", "Notes", "Comments", or "Book Reviews" from distinguished and diverse authors, including, inter alia, judges, scholars, policy-makers, practitioners and students. All references in the Journal are formatted as per the latest edition of The Bluebook: A Uniform Style of Citation.

The review process usually involves two to three editors and takes 4–8 weeks from the date of submission, with expedited reviews possible in exceptional circumstances.

== Ranking ==
Since 2011, TL&D has consistently been ranked as the best law journal in India across all disciplines. According to Washington & Lee University's Law Journal Rankings, barring the inception year 2009 when it was not ranked, TL&D has retained the top position among all law journals (across all disciplines) from India from 2011 to 2017 (having scored the highest combined score and highest impact factor score). In 2010, it was ranked 2nd (combined score: 1.2) marginally losing out the top spot to Jindal Global Law Review (combined score: 1.6).

In the field of International Trade, TL&D was ranked as the 10th best law journal across the globe in 2012. Further, it secured the 12th position in 2013–2014; 11th in 2015; and 14th in 2016–2017.

== Editorial board and staff ==
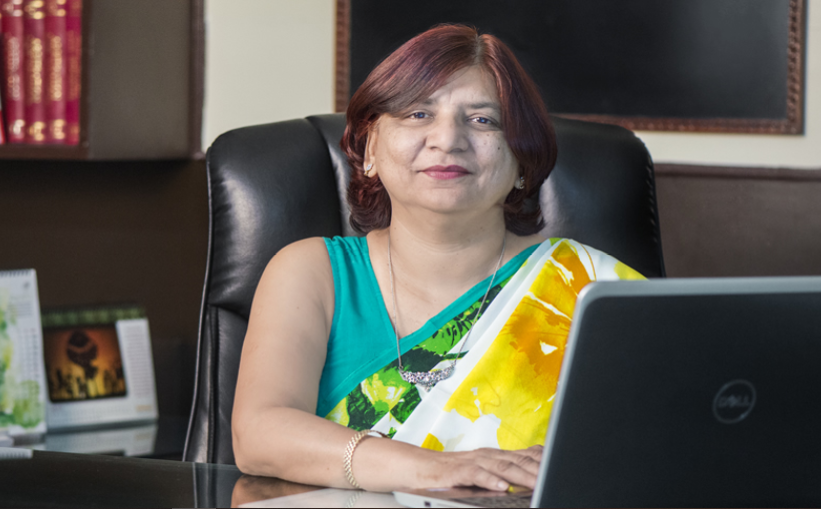
Poonam Saxena, the Patron of TL&D.

The editorial board of TL&D is made up of two editors-in-chief, one managing editor (ME), a technical editor (TE), and senior content editor (SCE), each along with other editors viz. associate editors, copy editors and consulting editors.

The journal is patronized by the vice chancellor of NLU, Jodhpur. It also has a member of faculty as the Faculty-in-Charge.

== Focus and scope ==
The Journal is committed to publishing perspectives from and for the developing world. It publishes "Articles", "Notes", "Comments" or "Book Reviews" from distinguished and diverse authors, including, inter alia, judges, scholars, policy-makers, practitioners and students.

The following is a non-exhaustive subject list outlining the scope of the journal: international law (public/private); international trade; economic law; investment law; intellectual property and trade; public health and trade; arbitration; competition law and policy; the WTO; international financial regulations; and sustainable development.

Submissions to the Journal are made in the form of:

1. Articles – Articles must deal with issues of contemporary interest and relevance and must demonstrate a high-level of analysis. Articles of a purely descriptive nature, unless about a development in a country or a region which may necessarily be of a descriptive nature, are not preferred. Articles should generally be between 10,000 and 20,000 words in length, though the length may vary as per the author's needs.
2. Notes and Comments – This section includes shorter Notes and Comments. Notes cover recent developments or are issue specific in analyzing a "micro-legal" question. Comments are essentially a critical analysis of an issue of relevance, including case laws, policy and legislative developments. Notes and Comments should be between 5,000 and 10,000 words in length.
3. Book Reviews
