= Universiti Sultan Zainal Abidin =

University in Terengganu, Malaysia

Coordinates: 5°23′44″N 103°04′58″E

- يونيۏرسيتي سلطان زين العابدين
- Former names: Kolej Ugama Sultan Zainal Abidin (1980-2006), Universiti Darul Iman Malaysia (2007-2010)
- Motto: Ilmu Demi Faedah Insan (Malay)
- Motto in English: Knowledge for the Benefit of Humanity
- Type: Public University
- Established: 26 March 2005; 21 years ago
- Chancellor: Sultanah Nur Zahirah of Terengganu
- Vice-Chancellor: Fadzli Bin Adam
- Students: 8961
- Location: Universiti Sultan Zainal Abidin, Kampung Gong Badak, 21300, Terengganu, Malaysia
- Campus: Kuala Terengganu (Gong Badak; main campus and Batu Buruk; secondary campus) Besut (Tembila campus)
- Colours: Black, Grey, White and Gold
- Website: www.unisza.edu.my
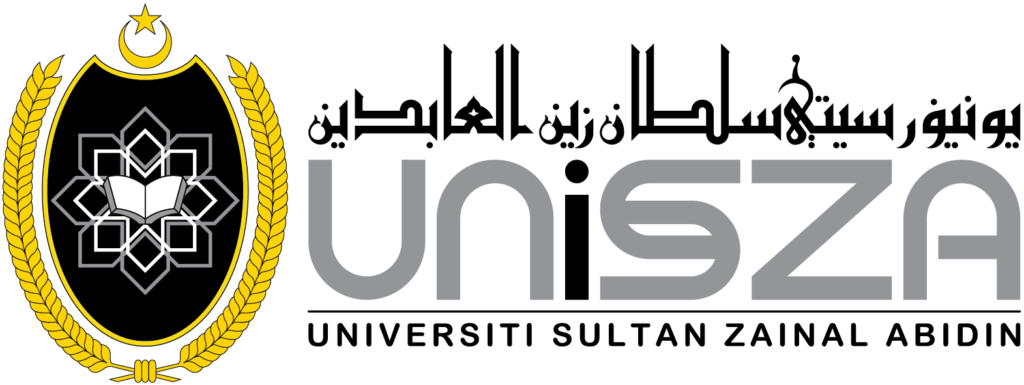

Universiti Sultan Zainal Abidin (abbreviated as UniSZA; Jawi: اونيۏرسيتي سلطان زين العابدين; English: Sultan Zainal Abidin University) is the 18th public institution of higher learning, located in the state of Terengganu, Malaysia. The university is a creature of the Act of Parliament known as the Universities and University Colleges Act 1971, with its constitution laid down under the Universities and University Colleges (Variation of, and Addition to, the Constitution)(Universiti Sultan Zainal Abidin) Order 2010. It is the first full-fledged university in the east coast of Peninsular Malaysia and the first university to be based on the “cluster” concept. It is also the first university in Malaysia to be modelled after University of London, United Kingdom.

The university has four campuses namely Gong Badak Campus, Medical Campus at Kuala Terengganu and Besut Campus at Tembila, Besut.

== History ==
The university was first established as an Islamic educational college known as Kolej Ugama Sultan Zainal Abidin (abbreviation KUSZA; Jawi: كوليج أڬام سلطان زين العابدين; English: Sultan Zainal Abidin Islamic College) on 27 January 1980, under the administration of the Terengganu Religious Affairs Department. KUSZA was made a statutory body with the passing of the Enactment 31/1981 by the Terengganu State Legislative Assembly. A permanent campus was built on a 350-acre (1.4 km^{2}) site in Gong Badak, Kuala Nerus, Kuala Terengganu and KUSZA began operating in the campus from January 1983. The first program to be offered was a Diploma in Islamic Studies (Syariah). This has expanded to 23 Diploma programs and three Advanced Diploma programs.

=== Establishment of the university ===
On 26 March 2005, KUSZA was upgraded into a full-fledged university known as Universiti Darul Iman Malaysia (abbreviation UDM; Jawi: اونيۏرسيتي دارالايمان مليسيا; English: Darul Iman University Malaysia) and the number of programs and disciplines were extended. It began when Prime Minister Dato’ Seri Abdullah Haji Ahmad Badawi announced the formation of a new university to be established in the state of Terengganu, Malaysia. This was followed by the appointment of the first Vice-Chancellor, Alias bin Daud, on 1 January 2006.

=== Present form ===
With the approval from Yang di-Pertuan Agong, Sultan Mizan Zainal Abidin on 13 April 2010, the Universiti Darul Iman Malaysia is now known as Universiti Sultan Zainal Abidin effective on 14 May 2010 after the government gazette of Universiti Darul Iman Malaysia (Incorporation) (Amendment) Order 2010 came into force on 13 May 2010. The Higher Education Minister, Datuk Seri Mohamed Khaled Nordin said in the press statement that the change of name was made after taking into account the historical background of the institution.

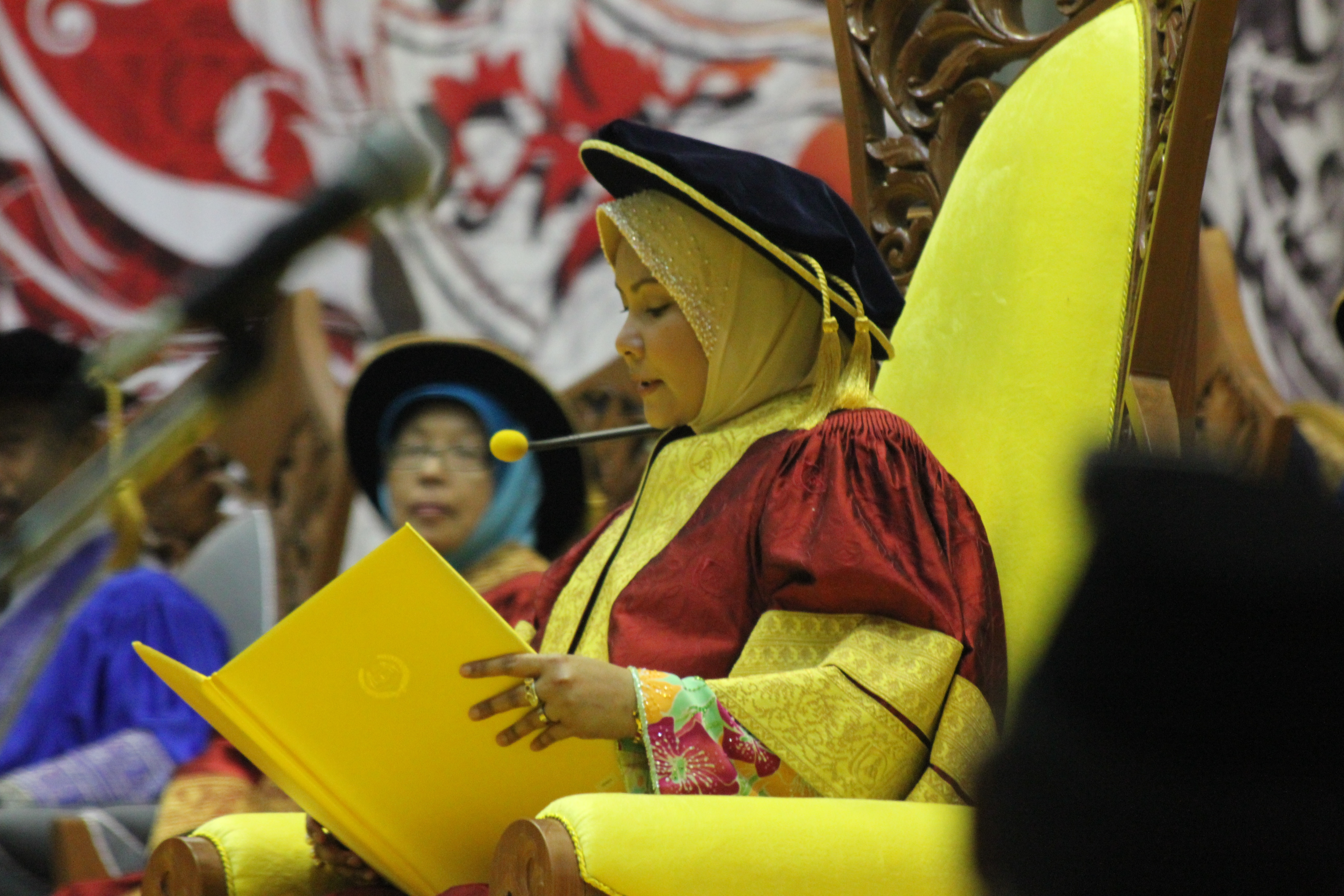
Chancellor Her Majesty Sultanah Terengganu Tuanku Nur Zahirah

== Academics ==
Universiti Sultan Zainal Abidin offers a wide range of undergraduate and postgraduate programs across various fields of study. The university is organized into several faculties and specialized centres, each focusing on specific disciplines and research areas:

- Faculty of Medicine
- Faculty of Health Sciences
- Faculty of Law and International Relations
- Faculty of Informatics and Computing
- Faculty of Business and Management
- Faculty of Islamic Contemporary Studies

=== Research and Academic Centres ===
UniSZA also operates several dedicated research and academic centres that support teaching, innovation, and community engagement:

- Centre for Biotechnology and Bioresources
- Centre for Telemedicine and Health Technology
- Institute of Islamic Studies and Contemporary Thought
- Centre for Food Industry and Agricultural Research

These centres provide specialized research facilities, community outreach programs, and industry collaborations that complement the university's academic curriculum.

== Campuses ==
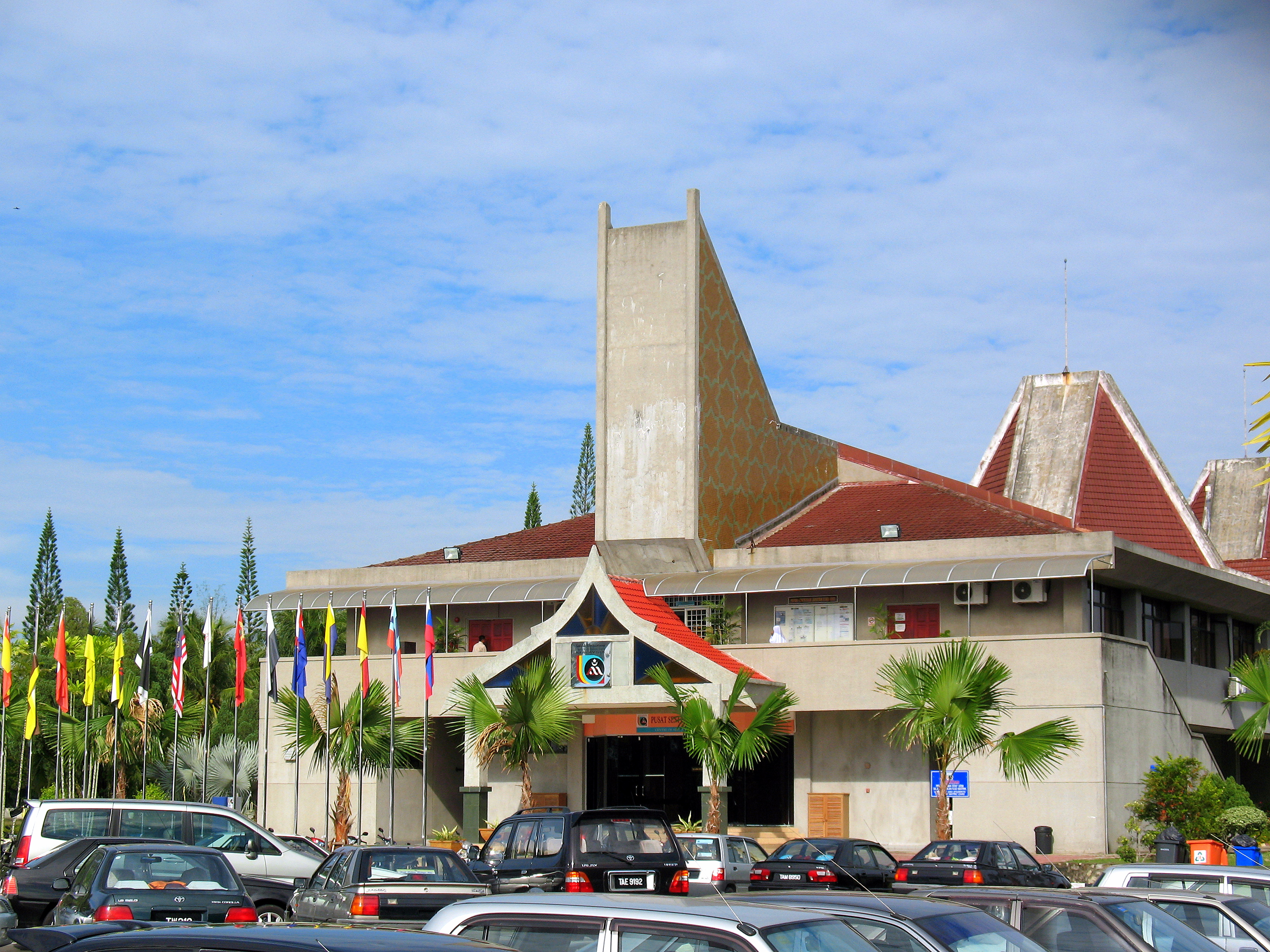
The administration building at Gong Badak campus

The university operates with two campuses in the city of Kuala Terengganu which are the Medical Campus and the Gong Badak Campus and another campus in Besut (Besut Campus). The Gong Badak Campus focuses on the teaching and research of Islamic knowledge and its harmonisation with other professional courses such as Accountancy, Law, Language, Design and Technology, Social Sciences, and Health Sciences. While the Medical Campus offers Medical and Nursing programs. The Besut Campus was developed with a niche in Biotechnology, Bioresources, Food Industry, IT and Computering. These campuses will have their own specialised field of studies, each with a separate and identifiable niche.

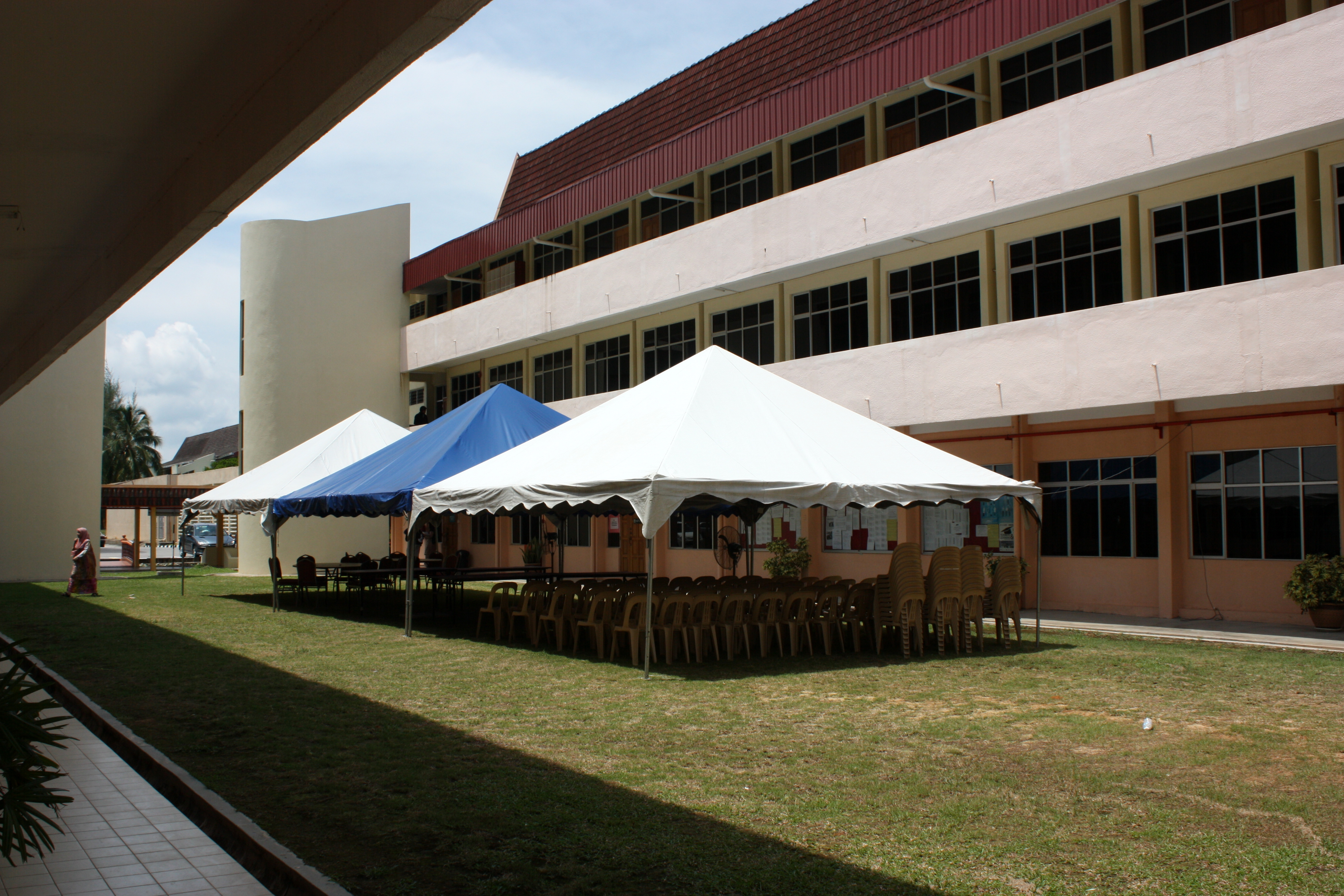
Faculty of Languages and Communications

Shared laboratory facilities for Faculty of Medicine and Faculty of Health Sciences

== Campus facilities and resources ==
Universiti Sultan Zainal Abidin Mosque

=== Universiti Sultan Zainal Abidin Library ===
The Universiti Sultan Zainal Abidin Library was established in 1980 when the first batch of students officially enrolled at the temporary campus in Sekolah Menengah Agama (ATAS) Sultan Zainal Abidin in Batu Buruk, Kuala Terengganu when UniSZA was first established as KUSZA. In 1984, the library has moved into the permanent Gong Badak campus and was placed at a ground floor of a three-storey building. The construction of the current library building, known as Perpustakaan Al-Mukhtar was completed in the middle of 1987. The library launched its operation in 2007 for the Medical Campus to provide information services and library services for all students and staff of Kota Campus. In conjunction with the operation of a new additional campus in Tembila Besut, the library also initiated its operation in September 2013. This branch will provide services for students, faculty members and all staffs of that campus.

=== Teaching and Clinical Facilities ===
Universiti Sultan Zainal Abidin operates Sultan Zainal Abidin Hospital (HoSZA), a teaching and specialist referral hospital located on its Medical Campus in Kuala Terengganu. HoSZA offers advanced imaging services (e.g., 3‑Tesla MRI and 256‑slice CT), subspecialty surgery, and is expanding to a planned capacity of 400 beds. HoSZA is also closely integrated with the Faculty of Medicine for clinical training and research.

=== KUSZA Observatory (Balai Cerap) ===
UniSZA operates the KUSZA Observatory (Balai Cerap KUSZA) in Merang, Setiu, Terengganu.

According to the university, the observatory has been in operation since 1992.

UniSZA plans to develop it as an **astronomy tourism hub**, with activities such as meteor observation, solar and lunar eclipses, and public astronomy education.

The observatory is managed under UniSZA’s **Institut Penyelidikan Alam Sekitar Pantai Timur (ESERI)**, and is used both for education and falak (Islamic astronomy) research.

In addition, UniSZA researchers have used the observatory to observe meteor showers and comets.

== Finances ==
As a full public university, its financial resources originate mostly from the federal government. Under the Ninth Malaysia Plan (Malay: Rancangan Malaysia ke-9), the university has been granted RM 417 million (US$137 million) to be spent from 2006 to 2010. While under the Tenth Malaysia Plan (Malay: Rancangan Malaysia ke-10), the university has received RM 420 million (US$138 million) to be spent between 2011 and 2015.

An additional RM 2.2 million (US$721 000) in form of research grant was granted by Terengganu state government to the university in April 2009 to be used for researching the Asiatic bitter yam or Intoxicating yam (Botanical name: Dioscorea hispida Dennst). This toxic plant is an important source of secondary food for the local people, especially in times of food scarcity. It is also used in local pharmaceutical industry and medicine.

== International co-operation ==
In 2011, the university has signed a memorandum of understanding (MoU) with the McGill University, Canada and agreed on the planning and development of an advanced modern teaching hospital and telemedicine facilities in Malaysia.

The annual convocation ceremony

== Recognition and achievement ==
In 2011, the team of two students from Faculty of Innovative Design and Technology, UniSZA won the main prize in the NST-Peugeot Car Design Competition 2011. This winning has earned them an all expenses paid five-day-four-night trip to Paris and visit to Peugeot's research and design centre in Velinzy, France.

In August 2011, the team of three students from Faculty of Law and International Relations, UniSZA won the 'Outstanding Achievement Memorial Award' in the Asia Cup International Law Moot Court Competition 2011 held in Tokyo, Japan. UniSZA was the first university in Malaysia to have received the prestigious award since 1999, the year when the competition was founded.

== Notable alumni ==
- Sufian Suhaimi — Singer

== See also ==
- List of universities in Malaysia

== Gallery ==
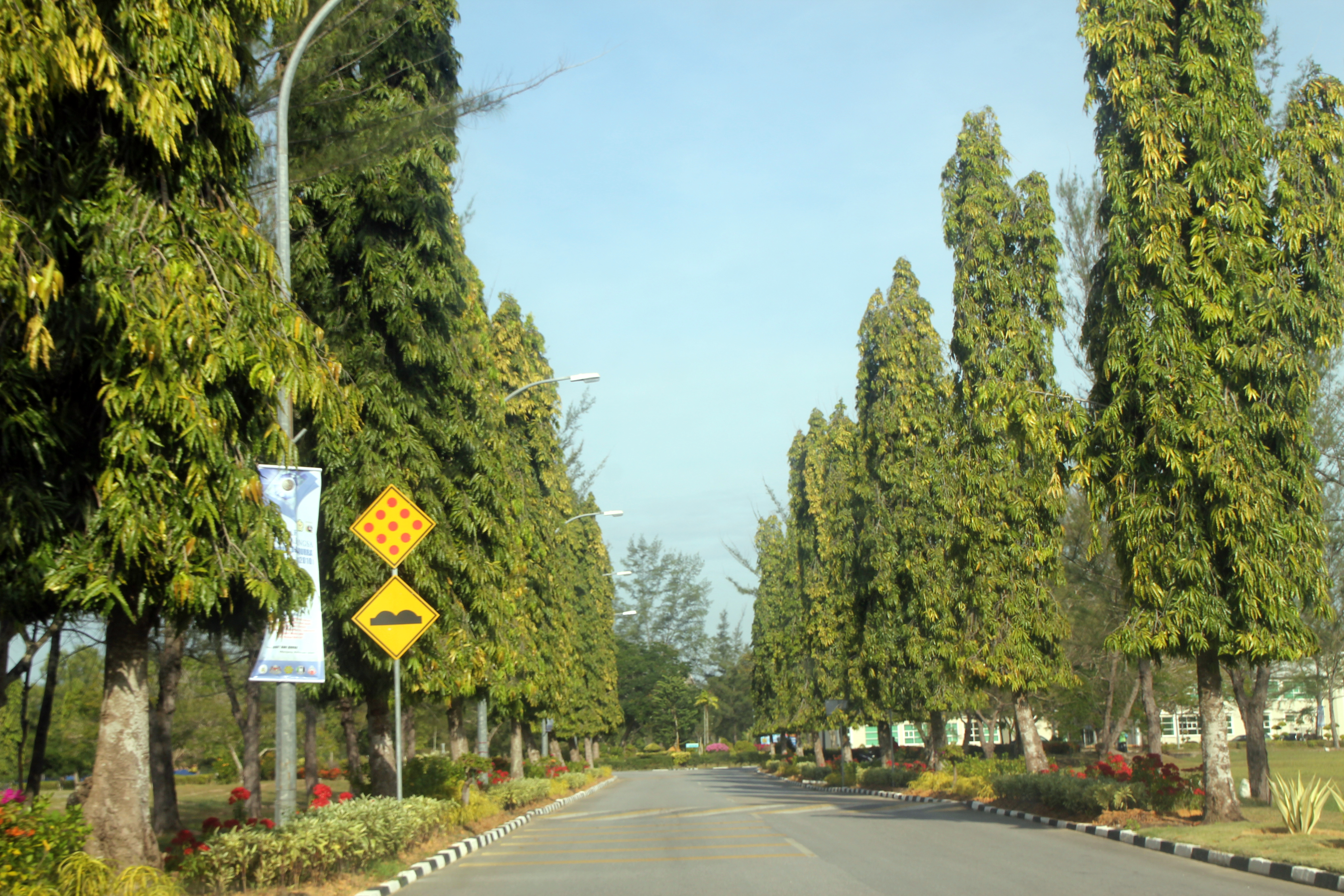
Entrance boulevard at Gong Badak campus

Main lecture hall at Gong Badak campus

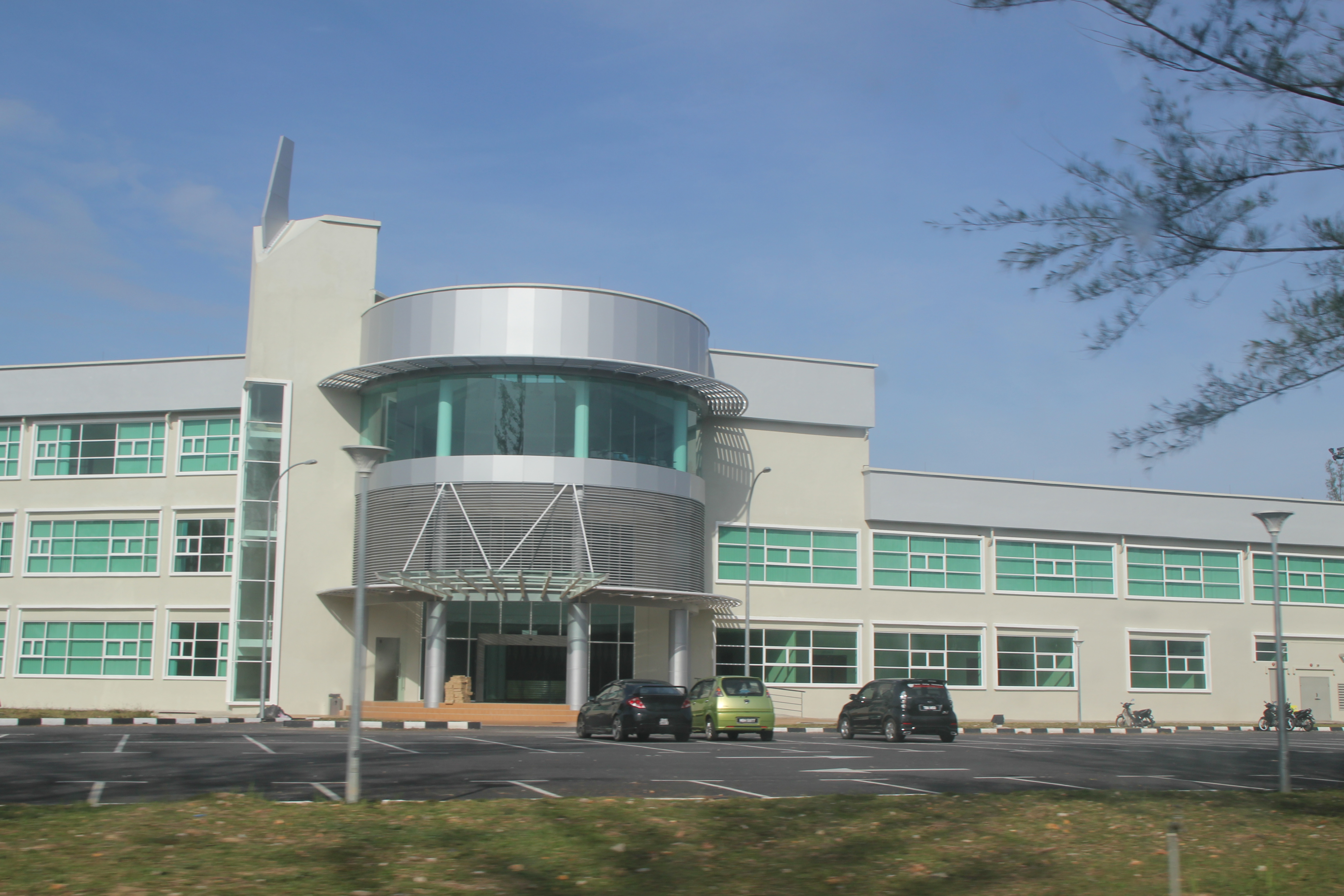
Information Technology Centre at Gong Badak campus

Department of student affairs and alumni building

Residential building at Gong Badak campus

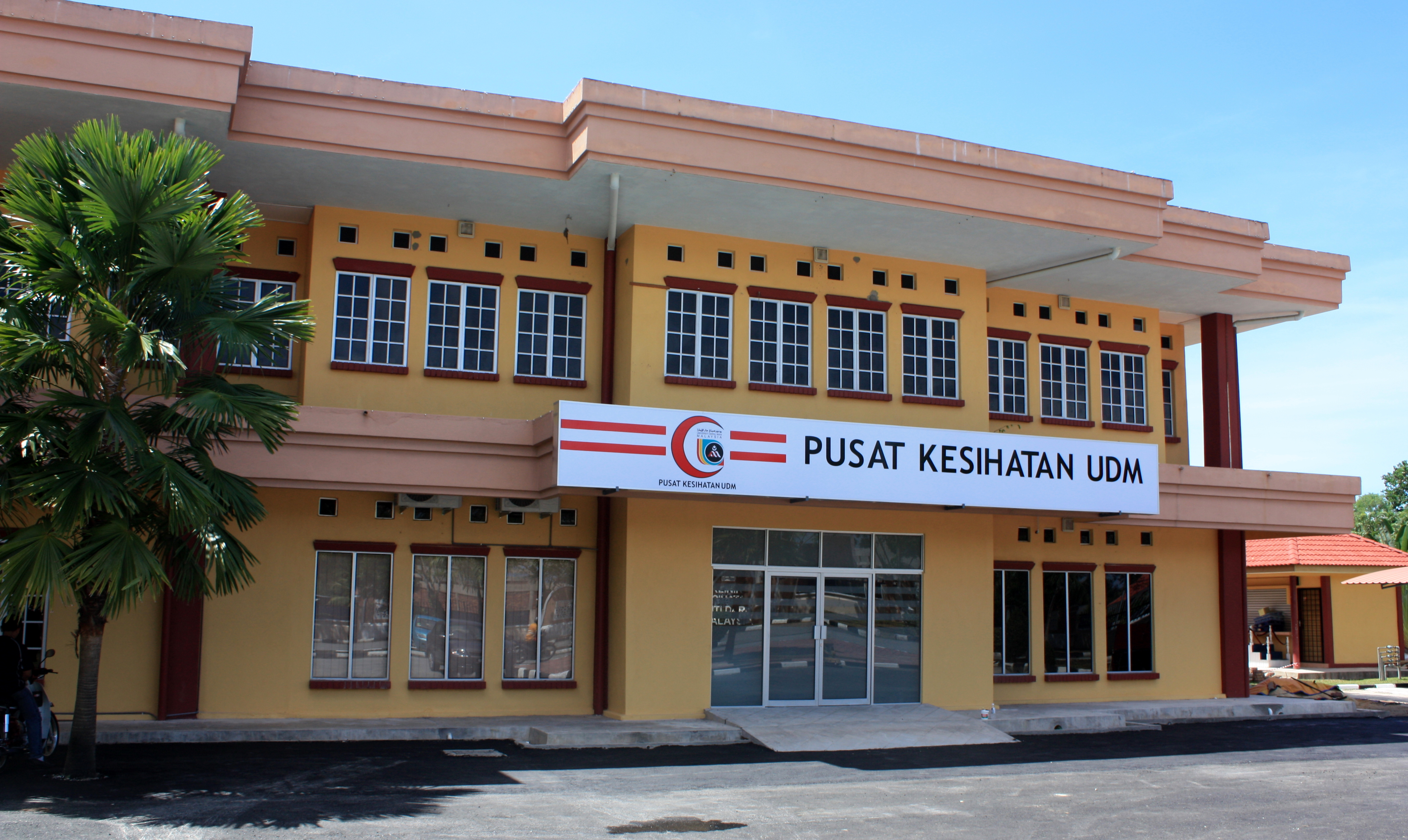
Health centre at Gong Badak campus

Moot Court at Faculty of Law and International Relations

== See also ==
- UniSZA F.C.
