= Surpura =

Village in Rajasthan, India

Surpura is a village in Jodhpur taluk of the Jodhpur district, Rajasthan, India. This village was adopted by the Legal Aid and Awareness Committee (LAAC) of National Law University, Jodhpur in the year 2016. The village has a dam named Surpura Dam. Surpura post office with the pincode 342304 serves Surpura.
