= Military Interdepartmental Purchase Request =

Fund transferring method in the American military

The Military Interdepartmental Purchase Request (MIPR) is a method for transferring funds amongst U.S. military organizations. It allows for multi-organizational cooperative efforts to be performed, rather than limiting funding to a single organization.

MIPR is defined in the US government's Code of Federal Regulations, 48CFR253.208-1, DD Form 448, Military Interdepartmental Purchase Request.

Colloquially, MIPR is pronounced mip-per, and is used both as a noun (I received their MIPR yesterday,) and as a verb (Did you MIPR the funds to their office yet?)
