= National Law University, Jodhpur =

Law university in Rajasthan, India

- Motto in English: Knowledge is Empowerment
- Type: National Law University
- Established: 1999; 27 years ago
- Founder: N. L. Mitra
- Affiliations: UGC, BCI
- Chancellor: Chief Justice of Rajasthan High Court
- Vice-Chancellor: Harpreet Kaur
- Academic staff: 38
- Undergraduates: 580
- Postgraduates: 46
- Location: Mandore, Jodhpur, Rajasthan, 342304, India; 26°21′45.41″N 73°3′25.52″E
- Campus: 55 acres (22 ha); Residential
- Language: English
- Website: www.nlujodhpur.ac.in

National Law University, Jodhpur (NLUJ) is a public law school and a National Law University established under the National Law University, Jodhpur, Act, 1999 enacted by the Rajasthan State Legislature. The university was established for the advancement of learning, teaching, research and diffusion of knowledge in the field of law. It is one of the autonomous law schools in India.

The university is recognised by the Bar Council of India, as well as the University Grants Commission under Section 12 (B) of the UGC Act, 1956, and is a member of the Association of Indian Universities.

== History ==
Vice-chancellors
- N.L. Mitra 2001-2004
- A.K. Koul 2004-2008
- N.N. Mathur 2008-2013
- Poonam Pradhan Saxena 2013-2023
- Harpreet Kaur 2023-

The idea for the establishment of a National Law University in every state was recommended by Justice Aziz Mushabber Ahmadi in his 1994 committee report as a way to improve the standard and quality of legal education in India.

The recommendations were finally implemented and National Law University, Jodhpur was set up in November 1999 by the passing of the National Law University Act, 1999 by the State Legislature of Rajasthan under the leadership of N.L. Mitra the founding Vice-Chancellor.

Since the establishment, the university has seen four Vice-Chancellors, Dr. Harpreet Kaur, a professor and registrar of National Law University, Delhi being the latest, who took over charge from Dr. Poonam Pradhan Saxena in 2023 and has been the Vice-Chancellor ever since.

The first UG and PG batch of the university was admitted in 2001, with the Undergraduate batch passing out in 2006 and the first convocation of the university taking place in 2007, the same was attended by Bhairon Singh Shekhawat the then Vice-president of India and the then Governor of Rajasthan and former President of India Pratibha Patil.

=== Important Events ===
- The university decided to stop offering the BSc LL.B. (Hons.) Undergraduate degree from the Academic Year 2016–17.
- The Rajasthan State Legislature in 2022 by amending the National Law University, Jodhpur Act, set a 2 Term maximum limit and a higher age limit of 70 for the position of the Vice-Chancellor,(whichever is earlier) and made it compulsory for the Registrar of the university to be an Indian Administrative Service or a Super time Scale Rajasthan Administrative Service Officer.

=== Response to the pandemic ===
The University on 14 March 2020 decided to suspend all classes till 31 March 2020 because of the state directives, the same was extended indefinitely due to the spread of the COVID-19 pandemic throughout the nation and the classes shifted to an online medium. Unfortunately, one student succumbed to COVID-19 during this time, which led to student protests against the Vice-Chancellor and the university administration.

The university started conducting online classes for the first-year Undergraduate students immediately after the declaration of the CLAT results to make up for the time lost due to the late conduction of the entrance examination.

The 14th Convocation of the university happened virtually and was streamed on YouTube. The 15th Convocation of the university was cancelled entirely due to the spread of the Omicron COVID-19 variant.

The university after deferring the decision to reopen once finally decided on 17 February 2022 to reopen the university in a hybrid mode from 1 March 2022 for all the students, keeping in mind the Rajasthan Government guidelines and the COVID-19 situation.

== Academics ==
=== Courses and curriculum ===
NLUJ currently offers following courses:

- B.B.A./B.A. LL.B. (Hons.) Flagship Integrated Undergraduate Law Degree Program (5 Years/10 Semesters)
- LL.M Master of Laws: Postgraduate Program (1 Year/2 Semesters)
- MBA: Post-Graduate Program (2 Year/ 4 Semesters)
- PGDM in Insurance Risk Management (1 Year/2 Semesters Diploma Program)
- PhD and LL.D: Doctorate Program

==== Undergraduate ====
===== B.A./B.B.A. LL.B (Hons.) =====
The university offers its flagship five-year integrated undergraduate program in two streams B.A. LL.B. (Hons.) and B.B.A. LL.B. (Hons.) Both are five year ten-semester courses with six subjects taught every semester and are open to students only on a fully residential basis. Admission to these courses is through the Common Law Admission Test.

The intake capacity of the undergraduate degree program is 104 students + 16 NRI/NRI Sponsored students with 15% and 7.5% seats being reserved for Scheduled Castes and Scheduled Tribes respectively. 5% seats for Physically Handicapped students is also reserved in each category.

The Honors course is offered to fourth and fifth year students in the following streams:

- Corporate Law
- Trade and Investment Law
- Criminal Law
- Intellectual Property Law
- Constitutional Law

==== Post-graduate ====
===== LLM =====
The university offers a fully residential 1 Year (two-semester) LL.M. in Corporate Laws and Intellectual Property Rights. The selection for this program takes place through Common Law Admission Test (PG).

The intake capacity for the LL.M. program is 50 Students with 15%, 7.5% and 5% seats being reserved for Scheduled Castes, Scheduled Tribes and Specially Abled Persons respectively.

===== MBA =====
The university offers a four-semester fully residential M.B.A. program with specialisation in Insurance.

The intake capacity for the MBA program is 40 Students with 15%, 7.5% and 3% seats being reserved for Scheduled Castes, Scheduled Tribes and Physically Handicapped candidates respectively.

The selection for this program happens based on two factors which are taken together to decide the merit.

- 50% weightage for marks obtained in graduate program.
- 50% weightage for marks in various qualifying exams like CAT, CMAT or MAT based on a scale decided by the university.

===== PGDM =====
The University offers a 1 Year/2 Semester Post-Graduate Diploma (PGDM) in Insurance Risk Management.

==== Doctorate ====
The university offers LL.D. and PhD programs at a doctorate level.

The university conducts a National Level examination each year for the selection of candidates for the PhD program, which is followed by a personal interview, candidates who have qualified UGC-NET and JRF are exempt from the written exam.

=== Rankings ===
University rankings

Law – India
- NIRF (2021): 8

The National Institutional Ranking Framework (NIRF) ranked it 8th among law colleges in 2021.

=== Publications ===
The university with the help of students and faculty publishes many high quality academic journals, a full list of the various journals published by the NLUJ is here-under:

- NLUJ Law Review: It is the flagship journal of the university. It is a bi-annual, double-blind student reviewed, and student-edited journal focusing on an inter-disciplinary approach towards legal writing. The Board of Editors consists of two faculty editors and a board of student editors at the university.
- Trade Law & Development: It is a student-run journal launched by the university in 2009. TL&D seeks to explore interdisciplinary perspectives on world trade, international law, environment and development. The Journal is published twice a year, both online and in print.
- Journal on Corporate Law and Governance
- The Comparative Constitutional Law and Administrative Law Journal (ISSN: 2582-9807) ["CALJ"]: It is the flagship journal of the Centre for Constitutional Law and Administrative Law, published under the guidance of Prof. (Dr.) I.P Massey, Dean, Faculty of Law, National Law University Jodhpur. It is an open-access online journal published bi-annually, aiming to foster debate on contemporary issues in comparative constitutional law and administrative law, with a comparative perspective. The first issue of CALJ was published in 2013. The issues of CALJ are indexed on SCCOnline and Manupatra.

=== MOUs and Collaboration ===
The university has signed many MOUs and collaborated with many different educational institutions and organisations, the list of various MOUs and Collaborations are:

- Freiburg University, Germany
- School of Law, King's College London, UK
- Ural State Law Academy, Russia
- Beijing Union University China
- Institute of Management Technology-Centre for Distance Learning, Ghaziabad
- University of Arizona, James E. Rogers College of Law
- University of Johannesburg (Faculty of Law), South Africa
- NLU-IIT-AIIMS (Knowledge Exchange Agreement): This agreement was signed on 4 April 2013.
- The University of New Hampshire School of Law
- NLUJ-MNLU Mumbai
- German Academic Exchange Service (DAAD)
- US Education Foundation, New Delhi
- Shastri Indo-Canadian Institute, New Delhi
- Commonwealth of Learning, Vancouver
- Construction Industry Arbitration Council, New Delhi
- NLUJ-Election Commission of India (IIIDEM)
- Bureau of Police Research and Development, New Delhi
- National Forensic Sciences University, Gandhinagar

== Endowments and Chairs ==
- Reserve Bank of India: The regulatory body has granted the university a Corpus Fund of Rs. 40,00,000/- to help the Centre of Studies in Banking and Finance conduct research on various issues pertaining to the economy and contemporary financial issues.
- New India Assurance Co. Ltd: The public sector general insurance company has contributed Rs. 40,00,000/- to establish a chair at the university to encourage research.
- General Insurance Corporation: The Public Sector Reinsurance company has contributed Rs. 35,00,000/- to establish an insurance chair at the university.
- Dushyant Dave: The Supreme Court Senior Advocate has granted Rs. 10,00,000/- for the development of the University Library.
- Ministry of Human Resource Development: The Intellectual Property Rights chair was established by the Government of India in the university under the IPERPO scheme during the 11th Five Year Plan.

=== Foreign Funding ===
- Eurasian Foundation: The Non-Profit Organization has sanctioned US$20,000/- to run a course in the university for its students and international scholars titled "Building Peace Communities in Asia".

== Research ==
National Law University, Jodhpur has established the following Centers with a view to facilitate students in understanding the intricacies of legal research, corporate work culture and develop insight in alternative forms of learning on academic and corporate subjects:

- Centre for Advanced Research & Training in Arbitration Law – CARTAL
- Centre for Comparative Constitutional Law and Administrative Law
- Centre for Research in Governance, Institutions, and Public Policy
- Centre of Risk Management and Derivatives (CRMD)
- Centre for Human Rights, Women Empowerment and Child Development
- Centre for Corporate Governance (CCG)
- Centre for Environment, Energy and Natural Resources Law & Policy
- Centre for IP Studies
- Centre for Human Resources Initiatives and Industrial Relations Studies (CHRIIRS)
- Centre for Human Welfare and Empowerment
- Centre for Tax Law (CTL)
- Centre for Studies in Capital Market
- Centre on Social Entrepreneurship and Social Innovation
- Centre for Policy & Research in International Law
- Centre for Human Rights of Children and Institutional Law Development (CHILD)
- Centre for Gender Studies
- Centre for Legal Theory
- Research Centre on Transactional Law (RECENT LAW)
- BRICS Law Institute
- Mahatma Gandhi Centre for Civilisational and Peace Study
- Centre for Family Law (CFL)

The university also conducts several short and medium-term orientations, training and refresher courses for NGOs, Government officials and public administrators, local self-Government, legal professionals including members of the bar and the bench, other administrative authorities and corporate officials.

== Student life ==
=== Moot Courts and Students' Achievements ===
Moot Courts are needed for legal education today and they are well integrated into the curriculum of the university. They are a part of the university's culture both internally and externally. On the external side, since its establishment, the university has been hosting the M.M. Singhvi Bar Council of India Trust Moot Court Competition, organised to commemorate the memory of the late M.M. Singhvi, a lawyer in India. The Competition is organised under the aegis of the M.M. Singhvi Memorial Trust and the Bar Council of India. Teams from almost all law colleges in the country participate in the Competition and since 2007, the competition has turned international with even teams from outside India participating in the Competition.

The university also hosted the North Indian rounds of the Stetson Environmental Law Moot Court Competition, which is another Moot Court Competition. Apart from this, the university has also hosted the Surana & Surana National Corporate Law Moot Court Competition which is sponsored by Surana and Surana.

The first national competition was won in 2004 when the team composed of Manmeet Singh Rai ('08) and Sagarika Chakraborty ('08) won the national rounds of the Louis M. Brown Client Counseling Competition held at the Hidayatullah National Law University, Raipur. The team subsequently represented India at the World finals of the Louis M. Brown Client Counseling Competition at Glasgow.

Since then the university has been victorious at the Susan J. Ferrell Inter-cultural Human Rights Moot Court Competition conducted by the St. Thomas University, Florida, in January 2007. The team composed of Anil Raj ('07), Gauarav Solanki ('07), Reshma Khan ('08), Kunal Mehta ('08) and Riddhi Sancheti ('09) secured the first position and also the second-best memorial prize. Also, Reshma Khan and Riddhi Sancheti were awarded the "Best Oralist" and the "Third Best Oralist" respectively.

The university has qualified six times to represent India at the Shearman and Sterling Rounds (White and Case Rounds since the 2009–10 edition) of the elite Jessup Moot Court Competition (2005–06, 2006–07, 2008–09, 2009–10, 2015–16, 2018–19) and was Octa-Finalist in most of these Editions, also winning various memorial and speaker citations.

In 2009, for the second year in running the university qualified for the International Criminal Court Moot Court Competition to be held in Hague in 2010. They bagged the award for the 'Best Victims' Counsel' in the 2010 edition. Only two teams from India had qualified for this competition.

In 2009, two members of the team representing the University at the Investment Law Arbitration Moot held at Frankfurt, Germany bagged honourable mentions for their speaking.

Teams from the university have received the Sarah Derrington Achievement Award twice at the International Maritime Law Moot Court Competition, Perth.

Students from the university (teams comprising Joydeep Sarkar ('09), Kartikeya Saran ('09) and Nupur Kabra ('08) in 2008; Rishabh Chopra ('10), Shashank Prabhat Kumar ('10) and Meghana Sharafudeen ('11) in 2009; Arjun Mital ('13), Zara Kaiser ('13 and Gargi Mishra ('13) in 2012; Bharatendu Agarwal ('13), Preeti Chockalingam ('13) and Namrata Amarnath ('14) in 2013 and Ninni Thomas ('15), Aphune Kezo ('14) in 2014) have also been selected to represent India at five editions of the Jean Pictet Competition on International Humanitarian Law. It also has been a consistent performer in the All India Bar Council Moot Court Competition.

Court Room Exercises(CREs)

NLUJ is the only National Law University to have Moot courts as a part of its educational curriculum. Students are required to draft memorials and subsequently participate in oral proceedings in every law subject per semester.

=== Legal Aid Clinic ===
The Legal Aid Clinic of National Law University, Jodhpur spreads legal awareness among the rural masses of Rajasthan through educational street plays and free legal advice.

Following the Government of India's initiative of Smart Village, the Legal Aid and Awareness Committee of the University has adopted the nearby village of Surpura and has been working extensively towards the development of public facilities and basic infrastructure of the village.

=== College committees ===
The following seven committees are student run and organise various events that take place in the university:

- Academic Support & Literary Committee
- Alternative Dispute Resolution Committee
- Cultural Committee
- Legal Aid and Awareness Committee
- Moot Court Committee
- Sports Committee
- Students Career Counseling & Placement Bureau

=== Events ===
==== Yuvardha ====
This event is the university's biennial Inter Law College Sports fest organised by the Sports Committee since 2009, with many law universities from across India participating in this sports fest, the fifth edition of Yuvardha saw a participation of over 800 students. The main highlight of the fest is that no first round matchup is an elimination round.

As of December 2023 the university has hosted seven editions of this fest with the last one being Yuvardha VII which was hosted in October 2023.

==== NH-65 ====
The Cultural Committee and the Academic Support and Literary Committee of NLUJ have been organising this biennial Inter Law College Literary and Cultural Fest since 2010, this event derived its name from the location of the University on National Highway-65.

As of May 2022 the university has hosted five editions of this fest with the last one being hosted in October 2018.

=== IT Infrastructure ===
National Law University provides 24*7 Internet access to every student. It has subscribed to various online Law and other libraries like Westlaw (India and UK), Jstor, Hein Online, Lexis Nexis, Economic and Political Weekly, Kluwer Arbitration, Kluwer Online, SCC Online and Manupatra which makes it easier for students to find relevant research work.

The university also provides access to Turnitin which is an anti-plagiarism software to all the students.

The Local Area Network (LAN) provides connectivity to the entire campus including the Halls of Residence. Wireless Internet connectivity is also provided throughout the campus.

== Graduate Outcomes ==
Students who have graduated from NLUJ have pursued many diverse range of careers, some of them are as follows:

=== Domestic Corporate Law Firms ===
The average package for students opting for corporate law is around Rs. 14-18 lakhs. With many top Indian law firms like Shardul Amarchand Mangaldas, Cyril Amarchand Mangaldas, Khaitan & Co. and AZB & Partners recruiting from the university.

=== International Law Firms ===
International Law Firms and Magic Circle firms like Allen and Overy, Clifford Chance, Herbert Smith and Linklaters have offered vacation schemes to Under Graduate students with packages ranging between Rs. 28 lakh to Rs. 30 lakh per annum.

=== Private Companies/Institutions ===
Many Students have also joined Financial Institutions and private companies as consultants/lawyers, like ICICI Bank, Ernst & Young, Goldman Sachs and Deutsche Bank.

=== Government Jobs ===
Students have also joined many Public Sector Undertakings and Regulatory Bodies like SEBI, Indian Oil Corporation, Bharat Heavy Electrical and National Thermal Power Corporation. Students also opt to prepare for Civil Services and Judicial Services Examinations of various states with many getting selected as Judges and Bureaucrats and serving across the country.

=== Litigation ===
Many students also opt for Litigation in the various High Courts and the Supreme Court of India.

=== Academia ===
The students graduating the universities have received offers for higher studies from universities like King’s College, Georgetown University, Leiden University, Northwestern University, the London School of Economics and Political Science, the University of California, Los Angeles, the University of Cambridge, the University of Oxford, Vanderbilt University, Warwick University and many more institutions of eminence.

== Alumni Association ==
The National Law University, Jodhpur Alumni Association (NLUJAA) serves as a platform to foster connections between the university's alumni and the institution. Its primary objectives are to strengthen ties between graduates, provide opportunities for networking, support the professional development of alumni, and contribute to the growth of NLU Jodhpur.

=== Executive Committee ===
Executive plays a key role in managing and directing the association's activities. The committee typically comprises distinguished alumni who volunteer their time to guide the association, promote its objectives, and ensure its smooth operation and they are elected by Alumni. Here are list of office bearer:

Name	Post
Sohit Choudhary	President
Mr. Shashank Agarwal	Vice President
Mr. Ketan Paul	Secretary
Mr. Pranaya Goyal	Treasurer
Mr. Akash Singhvi	Member
Mr. Ali Amerjee	Member
Mr. Arvind Waghela	Member
Mr. Keshav Malpani	Member
Mr. Amit Bikram Dey	Member

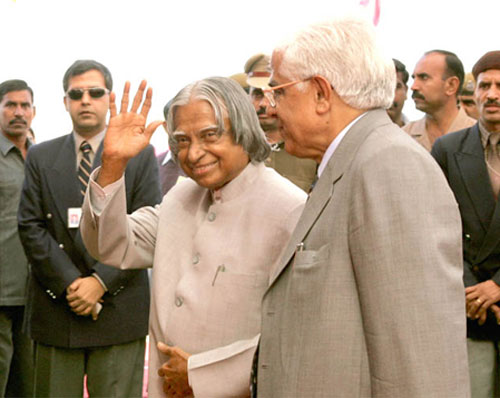
President A. P. J. Abdul Kalam at NLU Jodhpur.

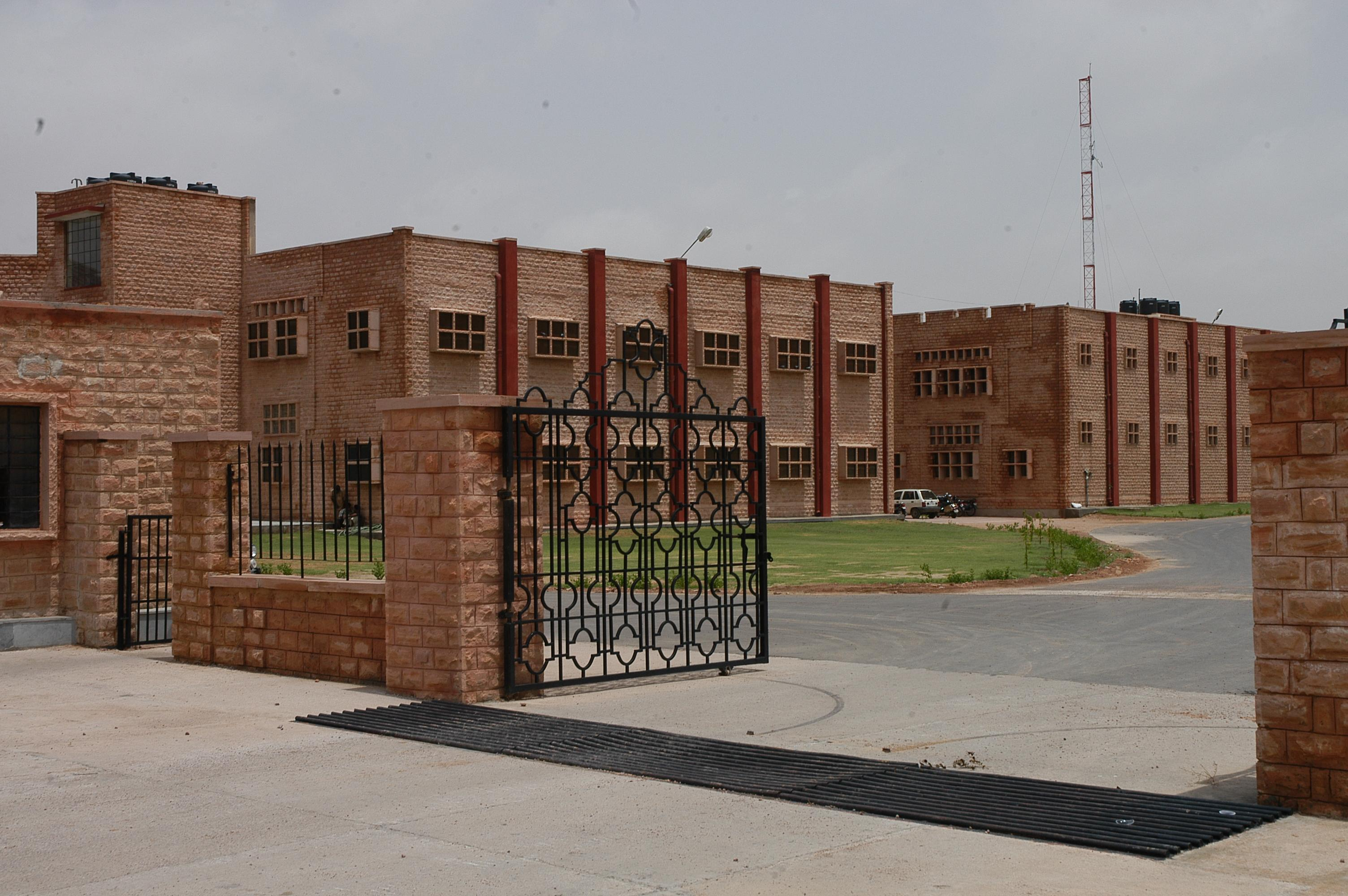
Entrance of the university

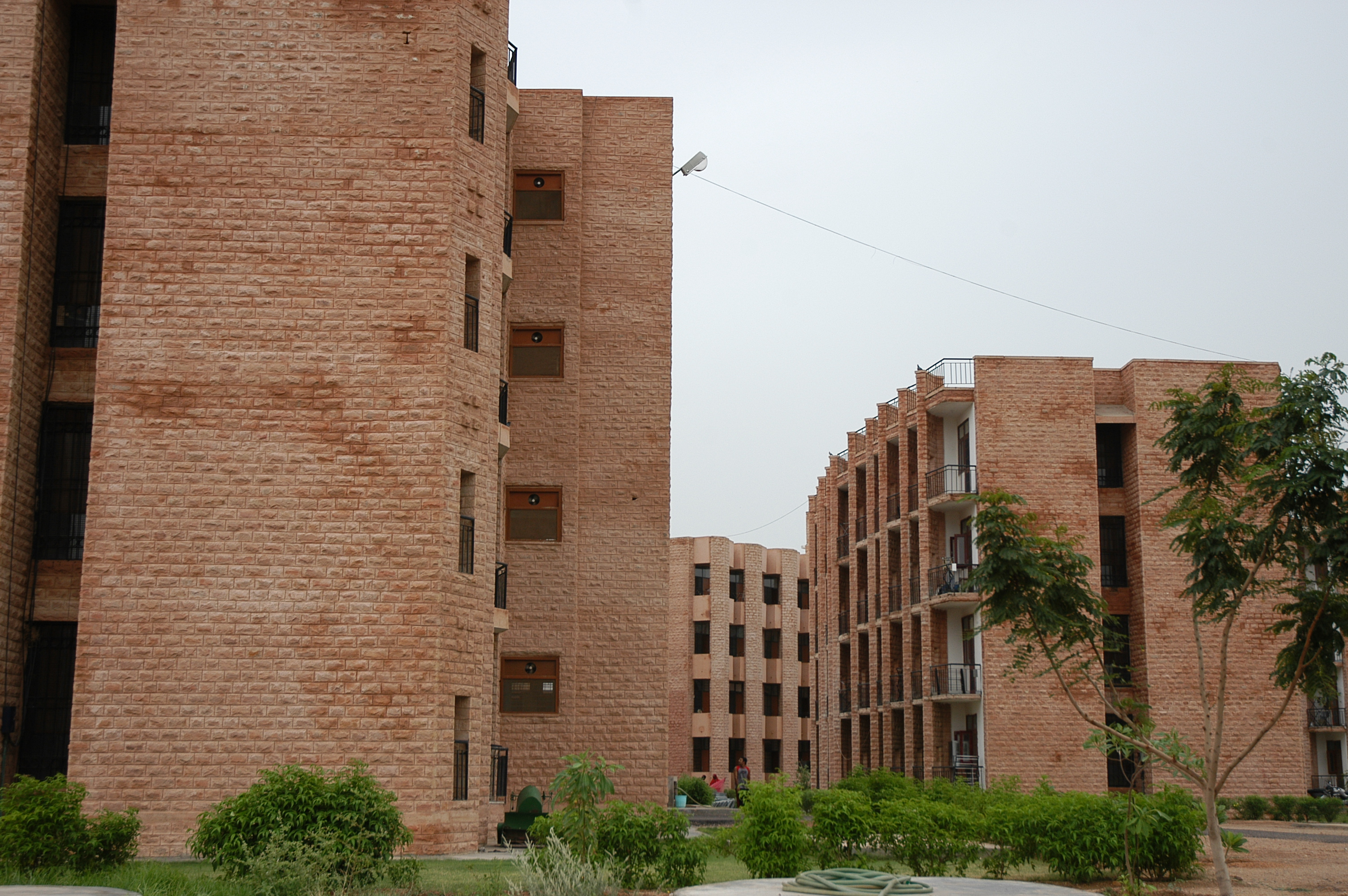
Hostels of the university

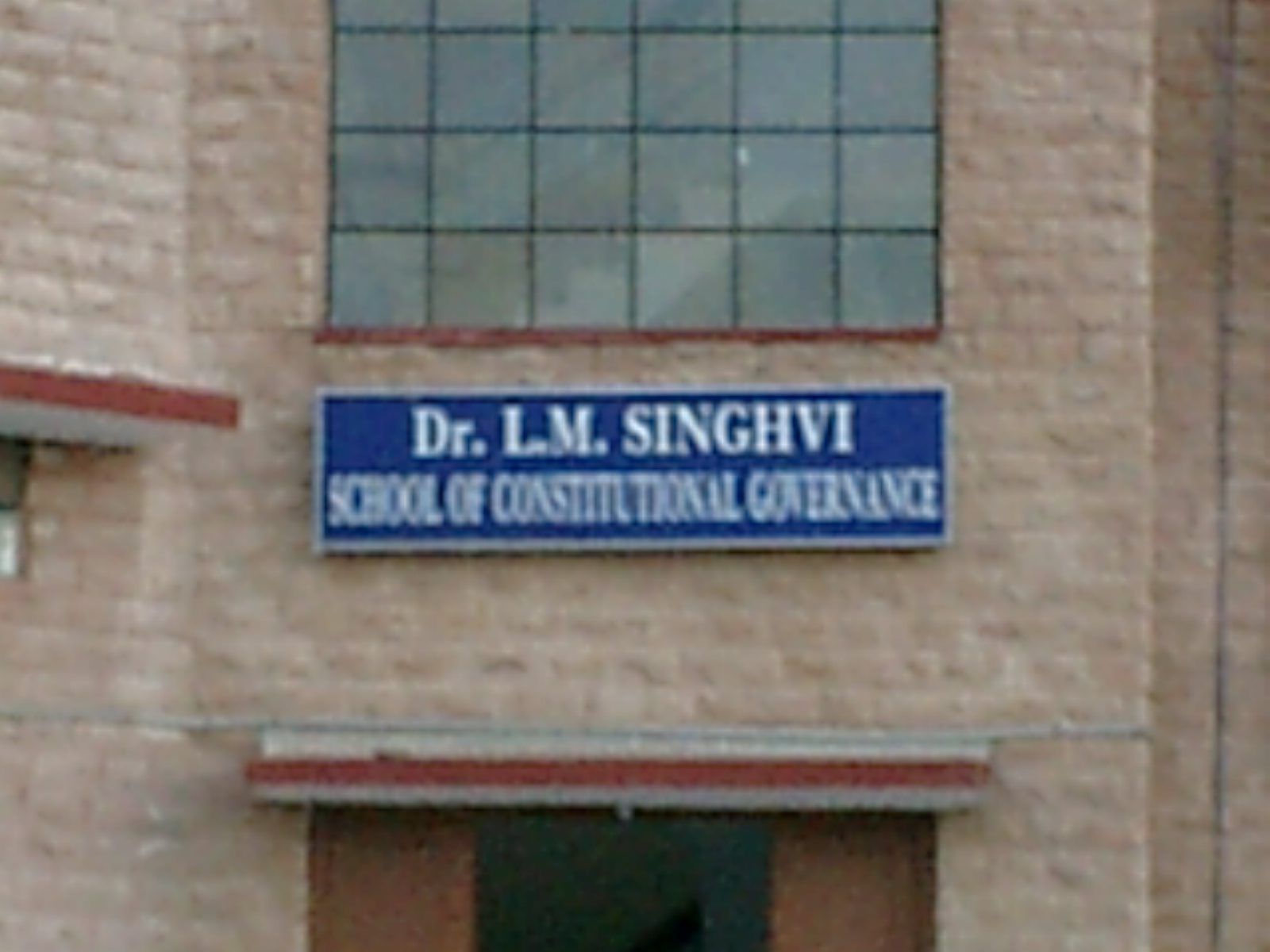
Constitutional block

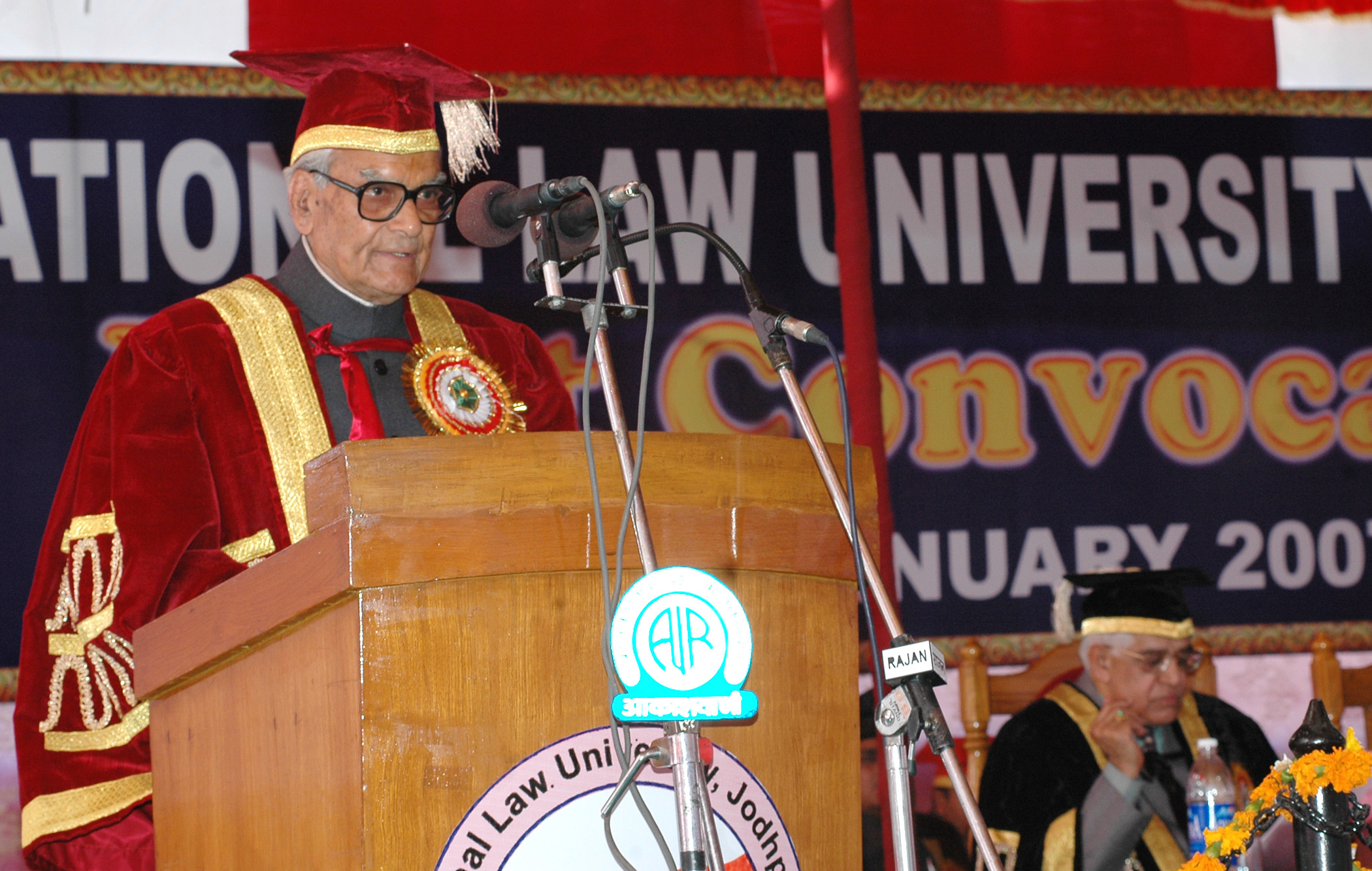
Vice-President, Shri Bhairon Singh Shekhawat at the Convocation of the university.

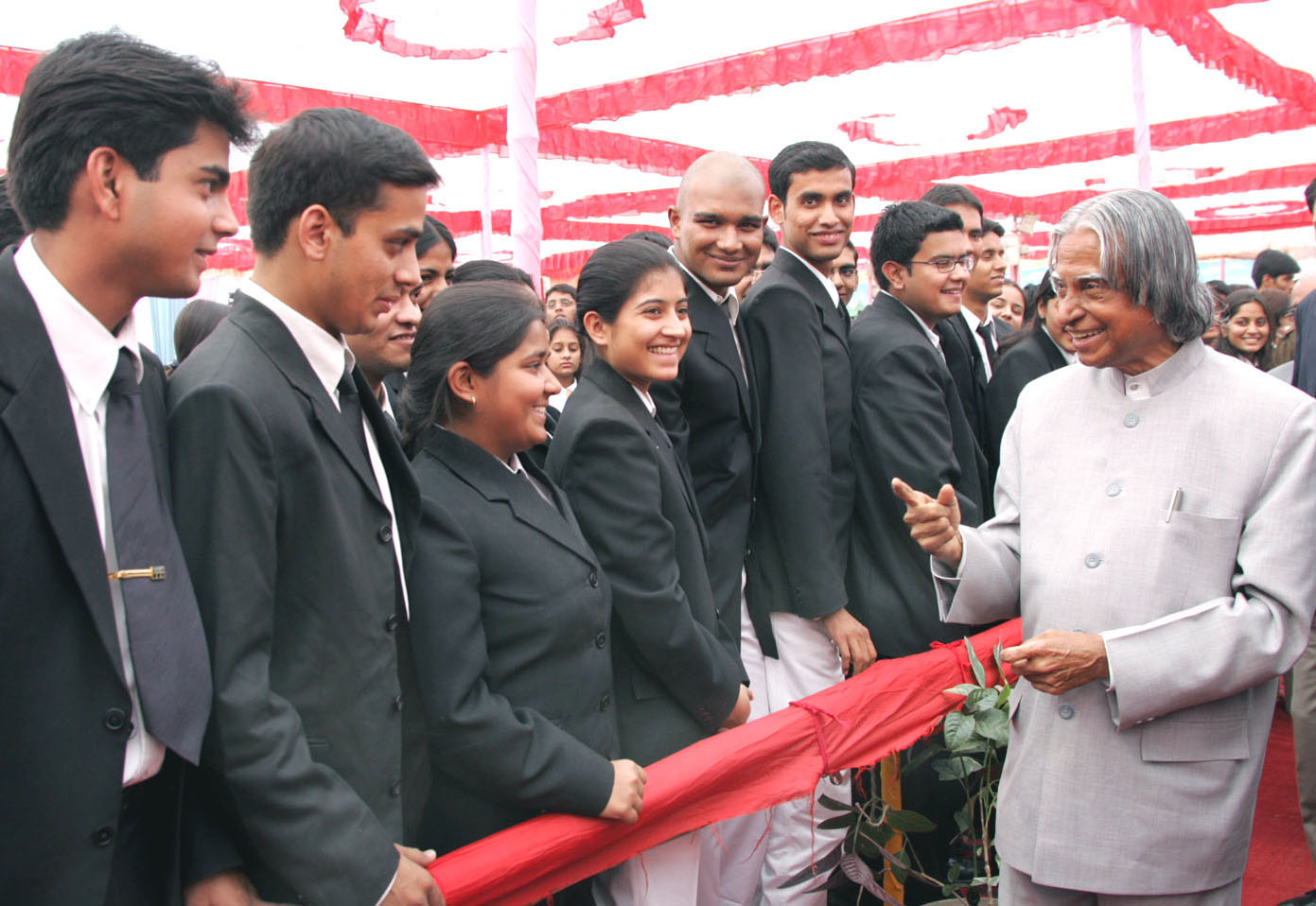
President Dr. A.P.J. Abdul Kalam interacting with the students of NLUJ.

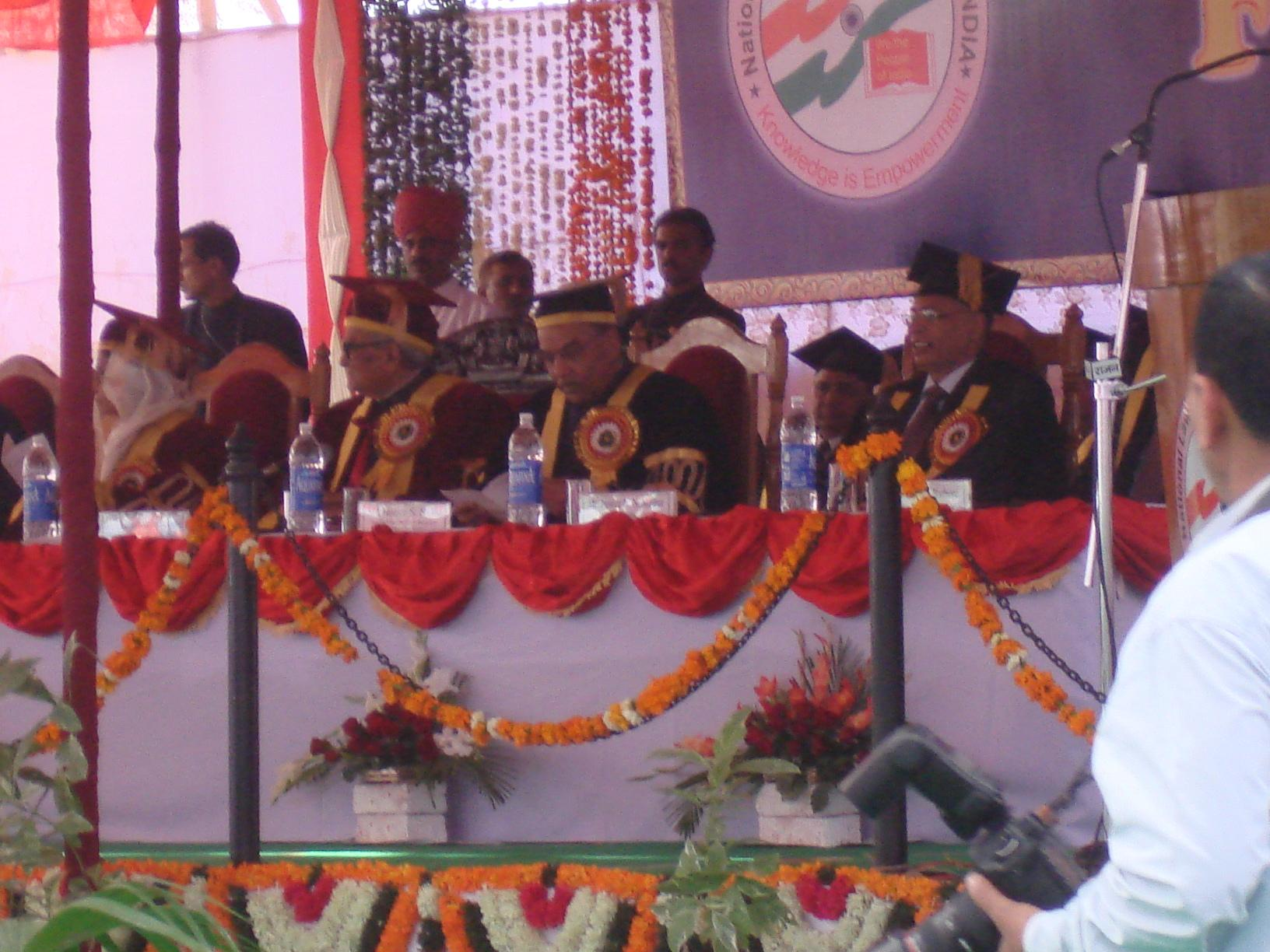
First Convocation of the university.

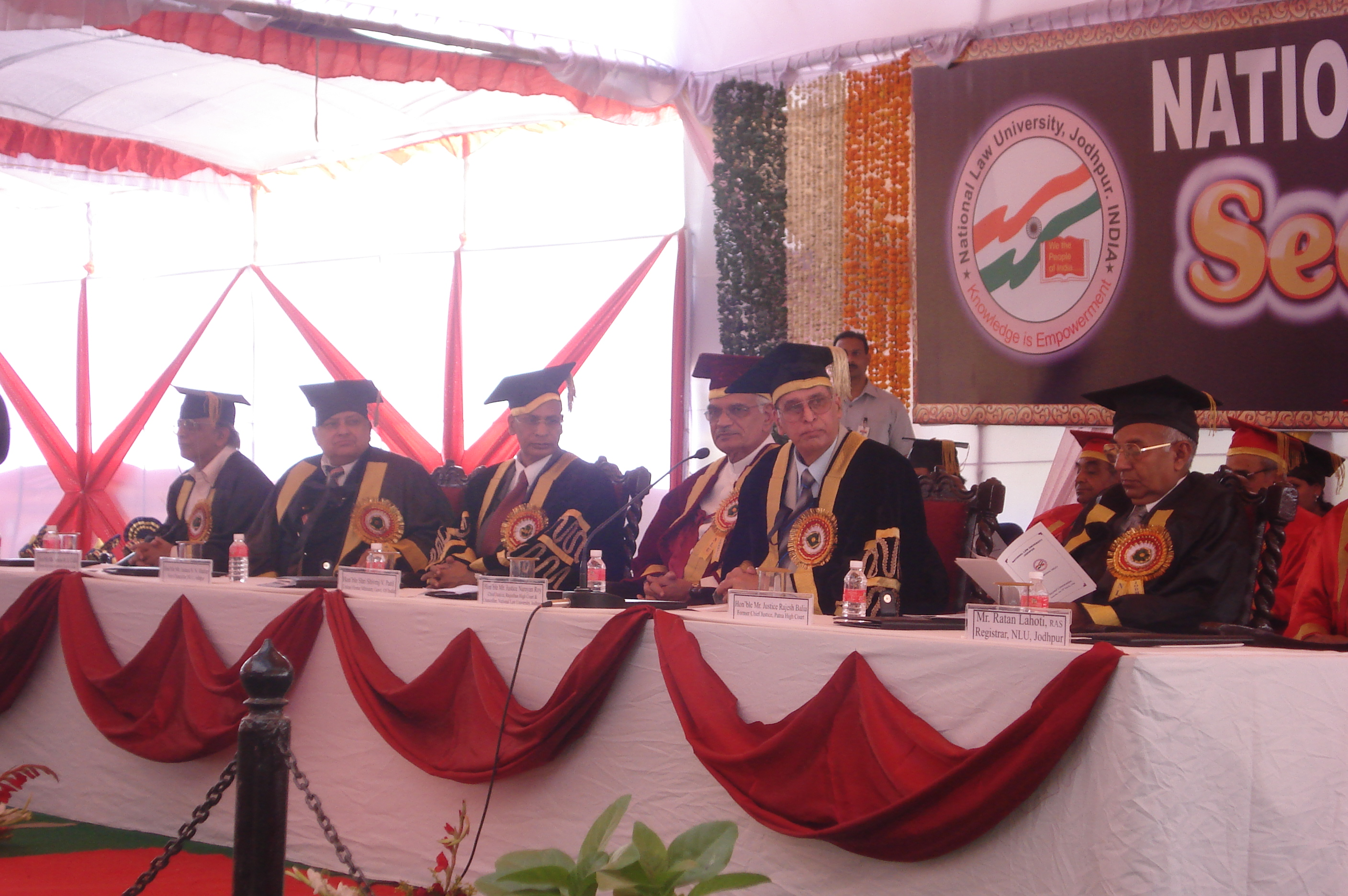
Second Convocation of the university.

== See also ==
- National Law School of India University
- National Academy of Legal Studies and Research
- Gujarat National Law University
