= Ho Chi Minh City University of Law =

University in Ho Chi Minh City, Vietnam

Coordinates: 10°46′3.88″N 106°42′20.47″E

- Đại Học Luật Thành phố Hồ Chí Minh
- Type: Public
- Established: March 30th 1996
- Rector: Doctor Lê Trường Sơn
- Address: No.2 Nguyễn Tất Thành Street, Xóm Chiếu, District 4, Ho Chi Minh City, Vietnam
- Campus: Urban and Suburban
- Website: www.hcmulaw.edu.vn

Ho Chi Minh City University of Law (ULAW Vietnamese: Đại Học Luật Thành phố Hồ Chí Minh, French: Université de Droit d’Hô-Chi-Minh-Ville) is a university in Vietnam that offers undergraduate and postgraduate education in law and politics.

The university plays an important role as a legal research and advisory body for the Vietnamese government in legal and public administrative reform.

== History ==
The University was established in 1996, pursuant to Decision N° 1234/GD&ĐT of the Ministry of Education and Training. It was originally merged with the Ho Chi Minh City branch of the Vietnam National University.

On October 10, 2000, the Prime Minister issued Decision N° 118/2000/QWĐ-TT, which separated the Ho Chi Minh City University of Law from the Vietnam National University.

It became the first Vietnamese legal training school to cooperate in a master's degree program with a foreign university (University of the West of England in Bristol, England).

The current rector is Doctor Lê Trường Sơn (2024-N/A). His predecessor was Doctor Mai Hồng Quỳ (2007-2018).

== Faculties and Departments ==
- Faculty of Management
- Faculty of Civil Law
- Faculty of Criminal Law
- Faculty of International Law
- Faculty of Commercial Law
- Faculty of Basic Studies
- Faculty of Legal Languages

== International Programs ==
The Ho Chi Minh City University of Law has exchange agreements with more than 30 universities around the world and participates in a number of international exchange programs, such as Asia Campus, notably with the National University of Singapore or Nagoya University. The University also offers French, English and Japanese LLB programs.

The University offers two international Master of Laws programs :

- an English LLM degree delivered by the University of the West of England
- a French Master of Laws with a major in International and Comparative Business Law delivered jointly by French Law Schools Jean Moulin University Lyon 3, Montesquieu University, and Toulouse 1 University Capitole.

== Campus ==
The University currently has three campuses:

- The first and main campus is located at No.2 Nguyễn Tất Thành Street, Ward 12, District 4 (now is Xóm Chiếu Ward), and opposite the former Saigon Port with Dragon House Harbour which are facing with the Saigon River. It hosts the administration for the faculties and divisions, as well as the main library. It also hosts the student health care center, as well as a canteen.
- The second campus is located at 123 National Route 13, Hiệp Binh Chánh Ward, Thủ Đức (now is Hiệp Bình Ward), opposite the Fatima Parish Church Bình Triệu which also faces the Saigon River but the upper area. It hosts a three-floor international library, lecture halls, as well as a student sports center.
- The third campus is located in Long Phước, Ho Chi Minh City, near the Ho Chi Minh City–Long Thanh–Dau Giay Expressway and Đồng Nai River.

== Library ==
The Ho Chi Minh City University of Law Library is one of the major law libraries in the South of Vietnam. The library has over 75.000 legal books, 63 newspapers and magazines, and 1.000 PhD, MSc, and BSc thesis.

The University has undertaken these past few years to develop its databases and electronic resources and has implemented an e-portal.

== See also ==
- List of universities in Vietnam
