= List of autonomous higher education institutes in India =

The higher education system in India includes both private and public universities. Public universities are supported by the Government of India and the state governments, while private universities are mostly supported by various bodies and societies. Universities in India are recognized by the University Grants Commission (UGC), which draws its power from the University Grants Commission Act, 1956. In addition, 16 Professional Councils are established, controlling different aspects of accreditation and coordination. The types of universities controlled by the UGC include Central universities, State universities, Deemed universities and Private universities

In addition to the above universities, other institutions are granted the permission to autonomously award degrees, and while not called "university" by name, act as such. They usually fall under the administrative control of the Department of Higher Education. In official documents they are called "autonomous bodies", "university-level institutions", or even simply "other central institutions". Such institutes include:

- Indian Institutes of Technology (IITs) are a group of autonomous engineering, science, and management institutes with special funding and administration. The Institutes of Technology Act, 1961 lists twenty three IITs.
- National Institutes of Technology (NITs) are a group of engineering, science, technology and management institutes with special funding and administration. They were established as "Regional Engineering Colleges" and upgraded in 2003 to national status and central funding. The latest act governing NITs is the National Institutes of Technology Act, 2007 which declared them Institutes of National Importance. It lists thirty one NITs.
- Indian Institutes of Management (IIMs) are a group of business schools created by the Government of India. IIMs are registered Societies governed by their respective Board of Governors. The Department of Higher Education lists 19 IIMs.
- Indian Institutes of Information Technology (IIITs) are a group of autonomous information technology oriented institutes with special funding and administration. The Indian Institutes of Information Technology Act lists five central and twenty public-private partnership IIITs.
- Schools of Planning and Architecture (SPAs) are a group of architecture and planning schools established by Ministry of HRD, Government of India. All the SPAs are premier centrally funded institution.
- Indian Institutes of Science Education and Research (IISERs) are a group of seven premier institutes established by the Ministry of Human Resource Development, devoted to science education and research in basic sciences. They are broadly set on the lines of the Indian Institute of Science.
- All India Institutes of Medical Sciences (AIIMS) are a group of autonomous public medical colleges of higher education. As of 2020, these are 15 in number and are established by the Ministry of Health and Family Welfare.
- National Law Universities (NLU) are law schools established for the promotion of legal education and research. As of 2020, there are 22 NLUs in India regulated by the Ministry of Law and Justice and the Bar Council of India.
- Institutes of National Importance (INIs) are institutions which are set by an act of parliament. They receive special recognition and funding. The Department of Higher Education's list includes 95 institutions including all of AIIMSs, IITs, NITs, IISERs, SPAs, IIITs and some others like NIMHANS, ISI etc. were also legally awarded the status. INIs are marked below with a hash (#).
- Institute under State Legislature Act (IuSLAs) are autonomous higher education institutes established or incorporated by a State legislature Act. Institutes that are ‘under State Legislature Act’ enjoy academic status and privileges like State universities.

== Government-Funded Institutes ==
Institute	State	Location	Type	Established	Specialization
Sri Venkateswara Institute of Medical Sciences	Andhra Pradesh	Tirupati	IuSLA	1995	Medicine
Indian Institute of Petroleum and Energy	Andhra Pradesh	Visakhapatnam	––^{#}	2016	Petroleum Technology
School of Planning and Architecture, Vijayawada	Andhra Pradesh	Vijayawada	SPA^{#}	2008	Architecture, Planning
Damodaram Sanjivayya National Law University	Andhra Pradesh	Visakhapatnam	NLU	2008	Law
Indian Institute of Information Technology, Sri City	Andhra Pradesh	Sri City	IIIT^{#}	2013	Information Technology
Visakha Institute of Medical Sciences	Andhra Pradesh	Visakhapatnam	IuSLA	2016	Medicine
Indian Institute of Science Education and Research, Tirupati	Andhra Pradesh	Tirupati	IISER^{#}	2015	Science
Indian Institute of Information Technology, Kurnool	Andhra Pradesh	Kurnool	IIIT^{#}	2015	Information Technology
Indian Institute of Management Visakhapatnam	Andhra Pradesh	Visakhapatnam	IIM^{#}	2015	Management
National Institute of Technology, Andhra Pradesh	Andhra Pradesh	Tadepalligudem	NIT^{#}	2015	Technology
National Institute of Design, Vijayawada	Andhra Pradesh	Vijayawada	NID^{#}	2015	Design
Indian Institute of Technology Tirupati	Andhra Pradesh	Tirupati	IIT^{#}	2015	Technology
National Institute of Technology, Arunachal Pradesh	Arunachal Pradesh	Yupia	NIT^{#}	2010	Technology
Indian Institute of Technology, Guwahati	Assam	Guwahati	IIT^{#}	1994	Technology
National Institute of Design, Assam	Assam	Jorhat	NID^{#}	2019	Design
National Institute of Pharmaceutical Education and Research, Guwahati	Assam	Guwahati	NIPER^{#}	2008	Pharmaceutical
National Institute of Technology, Silchar	Assam	Silchar	NIT^{#}	1967	Technology
National Law University and Judicial Academy, Assam	Assam	Guwahati	NLU	2010	Law
National Institute of Technology, Patna	Bihar	Patna	NIT^{#}	1924	Technology
National Institute of Pharmaceutical Education and Research, Hajipur	Bihar	Hajipur	NIPER^{#}	2007	Pharmaceutical
Indira Gandhi Institute of Medical Sciences	Bihar	Patna	IuSLA	1992	Medicine
Chanakya National Law University	Bihar	Patna	NLU	2006	Law
Indian Institute of Information Technology, Bhagalpur	Bihar	Bhagalpur	IIIT^{#}	2017	Information Technology
Indian Institute of Technology, Patna	Bihar	Patna	IIT^{#}	2008	Technology
All India Institute of Medical Sciences, Patna	Bihar	Patna	AIIMS^{#}	2012	Medicine
Indian Institute of Management Bodh Gaya	Bihar	Bodh Gaya	IIM^{#}	2015	Management
Hidayatullah National Law University	Chhattisgarh	Raipur	NLU	2003	Law
Indian Institute of Management Raipur	Chhattisgarh	Raipur	IIM^{#}	2010	Management
Indian Institute of Technology Bhilai	Chhattisgarh	Raipur	IIT^{#}	2010	Technology
National Institute of Technology, Raipur	Chhattisgarh	Raipur	NIT^{#}	1956	Technology
All India Institute of Medical Sciences, Raipur	Chhattisgarh	Raipur	AIIMS^{#}	2012	Medicine
Indian Institute of Technology, Delhi	Delhi	Delhi	IIT^{#}	1961	Technology
National Institute of Technology Delhi	Delhi	Delhi	NIT^{#}	2010	Technology
All India Institute of Medical Sciences, Delhi	Delhi	Delhi	AIIMS^{#}	1956	Medicine
National Law University, Delhi	Delhi	Delhi	NLU	2008	Law
School of Planning and Architecture, Delhi	Delhi	Delhi	SPA^{#}	1941	Architecture, Planning
Gujarat National Law University	Gujarat	Gandhinagar	NLU	2004	Law
Indian Institute of Management, Ahmedabad	Gujarat	Ahmedabad	IIM^{#}	1961	Management
Indian Institute of Technology Gandhinagar	Gujarat	Gandhinagar	IIT^{#}	2008	Technology
National Forensic Sciences University	Gujarat	Gandhinagar	––^{#}	2020	Forensic Science
National Institute of Design, Ahmedabad	Gujarat	Ahmedabad	NID^{#}	1961	Design
National Institute of Pharmaceutical Education and Research, Ahmedabad	Gujarat	Ahmedabad	NIPER^{#}	2007	Pharmaceutical
Sardar Vallabhbhai National Institute of Technology	Gujarat	Surat	NIT^{#}	1961	Technology
Indian Institute of Management Rohtak	Haryana	Rohtak	IIM^{#}	2010	Management
National Institute of Design, Haryana	Haryana	Kurukshetra	NID^{#}	2016	Design
National Institute of Technology Kurukshetra	Haryana	Kurukshetra	NIT^{#}	1963	Technology
Indian Institute of Technology Mandi	Himachal Pradesh	Mandi	IIT^{#}	2009	Technology
National Institute of Technology, Hamirpur	Himachal Pradesh	Hamirpur	NIT^{#}	1986	Technology
Indian Institute of Management Sirmaur	Himachal Pradesh	Sirmaur	IIM^{#}	2015	Management
National Institute of Technology, Srinagar	Jammu and Kashmir	Srinagar	NIT^{#}	1960	Technology
Sher-i-Kashmir Institute of Medical Sciences	Jammu and Kashmir	Srinagar	IuSLA	1983	Medicine
Indian Institute of Technology Jammu	Jammu and Kashmir	Jammu	IIT^{#}	2016	Technology
Indian Institute of Management Jammu	Jammu and Kashmir	Jammu	IIM^{#}	2016	Management
Indian Institute of Technology (ISM), Dhanbad	Jharkhand	Dhanbad	IIT^{#}	1926	Technology
National Institute of Technology, Jamshedpur	Jharkhand	Jamshedpur	NIT^{#}	1960	Technology
All India Institute of Medical Sciences, Deoghar	Jharkhand	Deoghar	AIIMS^{#}	2019	Medicine
Indian Institute of Information Technology, Ranchi	Jharkhand	Ranchi	IIIT^{#}	2014	Information Technology
Indian Institute of Management Ranchi	Jharkhand	Ranchi	IIM^{#}	2010	Management
National University of Study and Research in Law	Jharkhand	Ranchi	NLU	2010	Law
National Institute of Advanced Manufacturing Technology	Jharkhand	Ranchi	NIAMT^{#}	1966	Manufacturing Technology
National Institute of Mental Health and Neurosciences	Karnataka	Bangalore	––^{#}	1925	Medicine
Indian Institute of Management Bangalore	Karnataka	Bangalore	IIM^{#}	1973	Management
Indian Statistical Institute Bangalore	Karnataka	Bangalore	ISI^{#}	1966	Science
National Law School of India University	Karnataka	Bangalore	NLU	1987	Law
National Institute of Technology, Karnataka	Karnataka	Surathkal	NIT^{#}	1960	Technology
Indian Institute of Technology, Dharwad	Karnataka	Dharwad	IIT^{#}	2016	Technology
Indian Institute of Information Technology, Dharwad	Karnataka	Dharwad	IIIT^{#}	2015	Technology
Indian Institute of Science Education and Research, Thiruvananthapuram	Kerala	Thiruvananthapuram	IISER^{#}	2008	Science
Sree Chitra Tirunal Institute for Medical Sciences and Technology	Kerala	Thiruvananthapuram	––^{#}	1973	Medicine
Indian Institute of Technology Palakkad	Kerala	Palakkad	IIT^{#}	2015	Technology
Indian Institute of Management Kozhikode	Kerala	Kozhikode	IIM^{#}	1996	Management
National Institute of Technology Calicut	Kerala	Kozhikode	NIT^{#}	1961	Technology
National University of Advanced Legal Studies	Kerala	Kochi	NLU	2005	Law
National Institute of Technology, Manipur	Manipur	Imphal	NIT^{#}	2010	Technology
Indian Institute of Management Indore	Madhya Pradesh	Indore	IIM^{#}	1998	Management
Indian Institute of Science Education and Research, Bhopal	Madhya Pradesh	Bhopal	IISER^{#}	2008	Science
National Law Institute University	Madhya Pradesh	Bhopal	NLU	1997	Law
National Institute of Design, Madhya Pradesh	Madhya Pradesh	Bhopal	NID^{#}	2019	Design
Indian Institute of Technology Indore	Madhya Pradesh	Indore	IIT^{#}	2009	Technology
Indian Institute of Information Technology, Design and Manufacturing, Jabalpur	Madhya Pradesh	Jabalpur	IIIT^{#}	2005	Information Technology
Indian Institute of Information Technology and Management, Gwalior	Madhya Pradesh	Gwalior	IIIT^{#}	2005	Information Technology
Maulana Azad National Institute of Technology	Madhya Pradesh	Bhopal	NIT^{#}	1960	Technology
All India Institute of Medical Sciences, Bhopal	Madhya Pradesh	Bhopal	AIIMS^{#}	2012	Medicine
School of Planning and Architecture, Bhopal	Madhya Pradesh	Bhopal	SPA^{#}	2008	Architecture, Planning
Indian Institute of Technology Bombay	Maharashtra	Mumbai	IIT^{#}	1958	Technology
Visvesvaraya National Institute of Technology	Maharashtra	Nagpur	NIT^{#}	1960	Technology
Indian Institute of Science Education and Research, Pune	Maharashtra	Pune	IISER^{#}	2006	Science
Indian Institute of Management Nagpur	Maharashtra	Nagpur	IIM^{#}	2015	Management
Indian Institute of Management Mumbai	Maharashtra	Mumbai	IIM^{#}	1963	Management
Maharashtra National Law University, Mumbai	Maharashtra	Mumbai	NLU	2014	Law
Maharashtra National Law University, Nagpur	Maharashtra	Nagpur	NLU	2016	Law
All India Institute of Medical Sciences, Nagpur	Maharashtra	Nagpur	AIIMS^{#}	2018	Medicine
Indian Institute of Information Technology, Nagpur	Maharashtra	Nagpur	IIIT^{#}	2016	Information Technology
Indian Institute of Information Technology, Pune	Maharashtra	Pune	IIIT^{#}	2016	Information Technology
Maharashtra National Law University, Aurangabad	Maharashtra	Aurangabad	NLU	2017	Law
Indian Institute of Management Shillong	Meghalaya	Shillong	IIM^{#}	2007	Management
National Institute of Technology Meghalaya	Meghalaya	Shillong	NIT^{#}	2010	Technology
Indian Institute of Science Education and Research Berhampur	Odisha	Berhampur	IISER^{#}	2016	Science
Indian Institute of Technology Bhubaneswar	Odisha	Bhubaneswar	IIT^{#}	2008	Technology
International Institute of Information Technology, Bhubaneswar	Odisha	Bhubaneswar	IIIT^{#}	2006	Technology
National Institute of Science Education and Research Bhubaneswar	Odisha	Bhubaneswar	NISER^{#}	2007	Science
All India Institute of Medical Sciences, Bhubaneswar	Odisha	Bhubaneswar	AIIMS^{#}	2012	Medicine
National Law University Odisha	Odisha	Cuttack	NLU	2009	Law
National Institute of Technology Rourkela	Odisha	Rourkela	NIT^{#}	1961	Technology
Indian Institute of Management Sambalpur	Odisha	Sambalpur	IIM^{#}	2015	Management
National Institute of Technology, Puducherry	Pondicherry	Puducherry	NIT^{#}	2010	Technology
Jawaharlal Institute of Postgraduate Medical Education and Research	Pondicherry	Pondicherry	JIPMER^{#}	2008	Medicine
Dr. B R Ambedkar National Institute of Technology	Punjab	Jalandhar	NIT^{#}	1987	Technology
National Institute of Pharmaceutical Education and Research, Mohali	Punjab	Mohali	NIPER^{#}	2007	Pharmaceutical
Sant Longowal Institute of Engineering and Technology	Punjab	Sangrur	SLIET^{#}	1989	Technology
Rajiv Gandhi National University of Law	Punjab	Patiala	NLU	2006	Law
Indian Institute of Science Education and Research, Mohali	Punjab	Mohali	IISER^{#}	2007	Science
Indian Institute of Technology Ropar	Punjab	Ropar	IIT^{#}	2008	Technology
Indian Institute of Management Amritsar	Punjab	Amritsar	IIM^{#}	2015	Management
All India Institute of Medical Sciences, Jodhpur	Rajasthan	Jodhpur	AIIMS^{#}	2012	Medicine
National Law University, Jodhpur	Rajasthan	Jodhpur	NLU	2001	Law
Indian Institute of Management Udaipur	Rajasthan	Udaipur	IIM^{#}	2011	Management
Indian Institute of Technology Rajasthan	Rajasthan	Jodhpur	IIT^{#}	2008	Technology
Malaviya National Institute of Technology Jaipur	Rajasthan	Jaipur	NIT^{#}	1963	Technology
Indian Institute of Information Technology Design & Manufacturing Kancheepuram	Tamil Nadu	Chennai	IIIT^{#}	2007	Information Technology
Indian Institute of Technology Madras	Tamil Nadu	Chennai	IIT^{#}	1959	Technology
Tamil Nadu National Law School	Tamil Nadu	Tiruchirappalli	NLU	2013	Law
Indian Institute of Management Tiruchirappalli	Tamil Nadu	Tiruchirappalli	IIM^{#}	2011	Management
National Institute of Technology, Tiruchirappalli	Tamil Nadu	Tiruchirappalli	NIT^{#}	1964	Technology
Indian Institute of Technology Hyderabad	Telangana	Hyderabad	IIT^{#}	2008	Technology
National Institute of Pharmaceutical Education and Research, Hyderabad	Telangana	Hyderabad	NIPER^{#}	2007	Pharmaceutical
National Institute of Technology, Warangal	Telangana	Warangal	NIT^{#}	1959	Technology
Nizam's Institute of Medical Sciences	Telangana	Hyderabad	IuSLA	1980	Medicine
NALSAR University of Law	Telangana	Hyderabad	NLU	1998	Law
National Institute of Technology, Agartala	Tripura	Agartala	NIT^{#}	2006	Technology
Indian Institute of Management Lucknow	Uttar Pradesh	Lucknow	IIM^{#}	1984	Management
All India Institute of Medical Sciences, Raebareli	Uttar Pradesh	Raebareli	AIIMS^{#}	2013	Medicine
All India Institute of Medical Sciences, Gorakhpur	Uttar Pradesh	Gorakhpur	AIIMS^{#}	2019	Medicine
Dr. Ram Manohar Lohia National Law University	Uttar Pradesh	Lucknow	NLU	2005	Law
National Institute of Pharmaceutical Education and Research, Raebareli	Uttar Pradesh	Raebareli	NIPER^{#}	2007	Pharmaceutical
Rajiv Gandhi Institute of Petroleum Technology	Uttar Pradesh	Jais	––^{#}	2007	Petroleum Technology
Indian Institute of Technology Kanpur	Uttar Pradesh	Kanpur	IIT^{#}	1959	Technology
Indian Institute of Technology (Banaras Hindu University) Varanasi	Uttar Pradesh	Varanasi	IIT^{#}	1919	Technology
Indian Institute of Information Technology, Allahabad	Uttar Pradesh	Allahabad	IIIT^{#}	1999	Information Technology
Motilal Nehru National Institute of Technology	Uttar Pradesh	Allahabad	NIT^{#}	1961	Technology
Sanjay Gandhi Postgraduate Institute of Medical Sciences	Uttar Pradesh	Lucknow	IuSLA	1987	Medicine
Dr. Ram Manohar Lohia Institute of Medical Sciences	Uttar Pradesh	Lucknow	IuSLA	2006	Medicine
Indian Institute of Management Kashipur	Uttarakhand	Kashipur	IIM^{#}	2011	Management
All India Institute of Medical Sciences, Rishikesh	Uttarakhand	Rishikesh	AIIMS^{#}	2012	Medicine
Indian Institute of Technology Roorkee	Uttarakhand	Roorkee	IIT^{#}	1847	Technology
National Institute of Technology Uttarakhand	Uttarakhand	Srinagar	NIT^{#}	2009	Technology
Indian Institute of Information Technology, Kalyani	West Bengal	Kalyani	IIIT^{#}	2014	Information Technology
Indian Institute of Management Calcutta	West Bengal	Joka	IIM^{#}	1961	Management
All India Institute of Medical Sciences, Kalyani	West Bengal	Kalyani	AIIMS^{#}	2018	Medicine
National Institute of Pharmaceutical Education and Research, Kolkata	West Bengal	Kolkata	NIPER^{#}	2007	Pharmaceutical
Indian Institute of Technology Kharagpur	West Bengal	Kharagpur	IIT^{#}	1951	Technology
Indian Institute of Engineering Science and Technology, Shibpur	West Bengal	Howrah	IIEST^{#}	1856	Technology
Indian Statistical Institute	West Bengal	Kolkata	ISI^{#}	1931	Statistics
Indian Institute of Science Education and Research, Kolkata	West Bengal	Kalyani	IISER^{#}	2006	Science
National Institute of Technology, Durgapur	West Bengal	Durgapur	NIT^{#}	1960	Technology
West Bengal National University of Juridical Sciences	West Bengal	Kolkata	NLU	1999	Law

== See also ==
- List of universities in India
