= Chinmoy Sankar Dey =

Indian molecular biologist

- Born: 18 March 1961 (age 65); Kolkata, West Bengal, India
- Education: Calcutta University; Jadavpur University; Indian Institute of Chemical Biology; California Institute of Technology; Baylor College of Medicine
- Known for: Studies on insulin resistance
- Awards: 2003 Shanti Swarup Bhatnagar Prize; 2003 N-Bios Prize; 2005 OPPI-Scientist Award; 2008 CDRI Award
- Scientific career
- Fields: Molecular biology
- Workplaces: National Institute of Immunology; NIPER Mohali; Bio-school, IIT Delhi

Chinmoy Sankar Dey (born 18 March 1961) is an Indian molecular biologist and a professor at Kusuma School of Biological Sciences of the Indian Institute of Technology, Delhi. Known for his research on insulin resistance, Dey's is a J. C. Bose National Fellow of the Department of Science and Technology and an elected fellow of the National Academy of Sciences, India and the Indian National Science Academy. The Council of Scientific and Industrial Research, the apex agency of the Government of India for scientific research, awarded him the Shanti Swarup Bhatnagar Prize for Science and Technology, one of the highest Indian science awards for his contributions to Medical Sciences in 2003. He is also a recipient of the National Bioscience Award for Career Development of the Department of Biotechnology.

== Biography ==
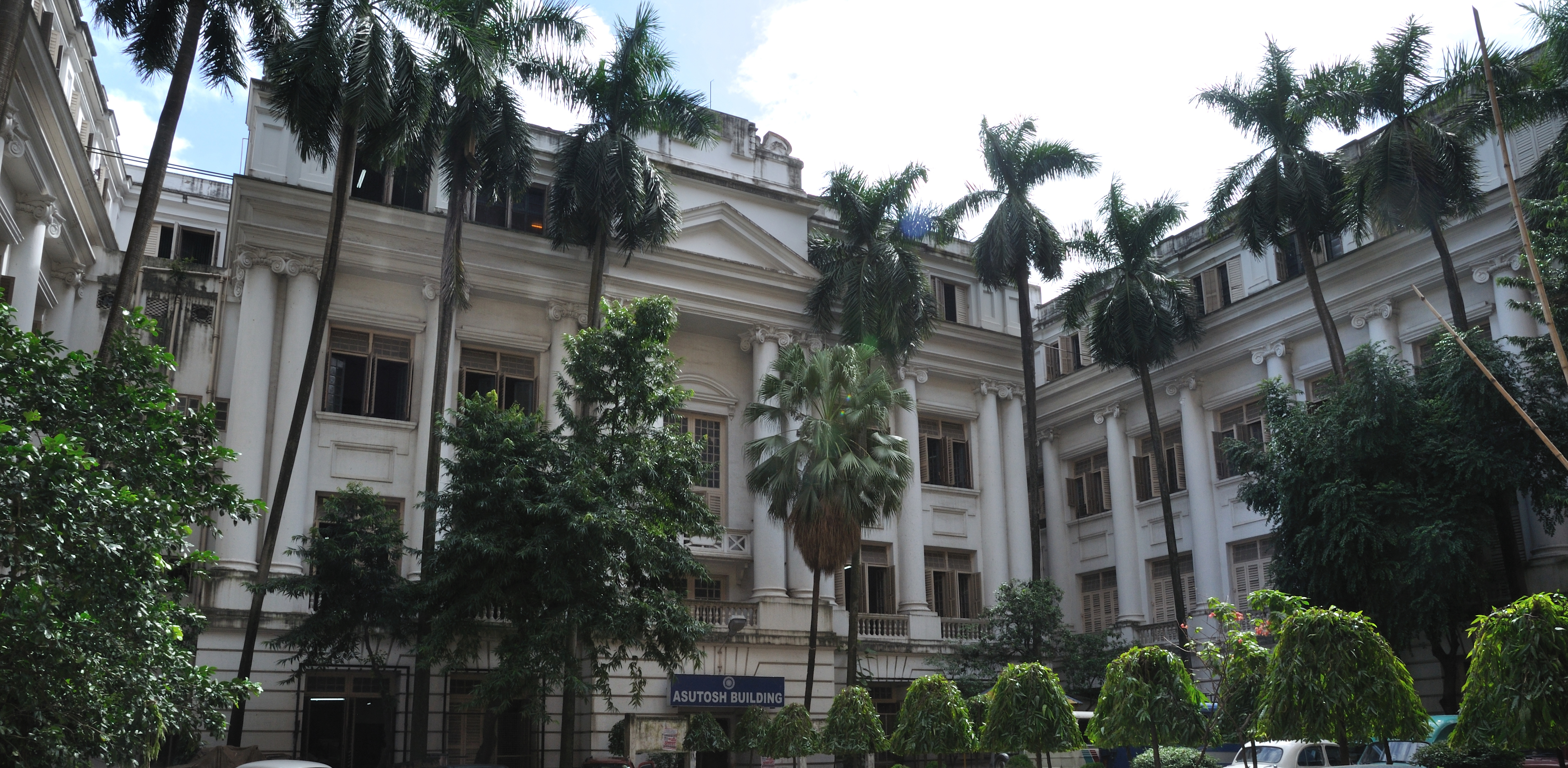
University of Calcutta

S. C. Dey was born on 18 March 1961 in Kolkata, the capital of the Indian state of West Bengal. He graduated in zoology from the University of Calcutta in 1982 and continued at the institution to obtain a master's degree in 1984. Afterwards, he joined the Indian Institute of Chemical Biology, in Kolkata, as a research fellow for his doctoral studies and submitted his thesis Biochemical regulation of sperm motility, which earned him a PhD from Jadavpur University in 1990. He did his post-doctoral studies initially at California Institute of Technology from 1988 to 1991 as a post-doc research fellow and later, at the Baylor College of Medicine, as a post-doc research associate from 1991 to 1992. On his return to India in 1992, he started his career by joining the National Institute of Immunology as a pool officer, but his stay there lasted only for two years.

In 1994, he moved to National Institute of Pharmaceutical Education and Research, Mohali as an assistant professor at the department of biotechnology where he served for over a decade and a half. During this period, he held positions as an associate professor (1999–2002) as well as a professor (2002–10), and he became head of the department in 2004. In 2010, he moved his base to New Delhi to join the Indian Institute of Technology at Kusuma School of Biological Sciences as a professor and is the head of the Central Research Facility. He leads a laboratory at IIT Delhi involved in research on Insulin-resistant diabetes and hosts a number of scholars and students. He also serves as a visiting scientist at Madras Diabetes Research Foundation (MDRF).

== Legacy ==
Dey's research has been focusing on the drug resistance of two diseases, leishmaniasis and diabetes. His work on insulin resistance included the development of an in-vitro model, which has potential applications in screening anti-diabetic drugs. The model, which involved insulin-resistant cultured skeletal muscle cells, earned him a US patent. Using the model in tandem with biochemical and gene silencing methodologies, he demonstrated that focal adhesion kinases and p38 mitogen-activated protein kinases could be used as possible drug targets. His team identified for the first time the apoptosis-like cell death in Type II topoisomerase and suggested the enzyme as a possible treatment protocol for Leishmaniasis. His findings were published in a 2005 article in Molecular and Biochemical Parasitology of Elsevier. He also proposed eIF4A, a member of a set of three related proteins, as a drug target to combat infection with Leishmania donovani, a Miltefosine-resistant type of trypanosome causing leishmaniasis. His work on myogenesis and muscular dystrophy showed insulin‑mediated dephosphorylation of PTK2 (focal adhesion kinase) could be stopped by inhibiting the activity of the insulin receptor tyrosine kinase, which was a new discovery. His research has been documented in numerous articles; (Note: See also "Selected bibliography" section) ResearchGate, an online repository of scientific articles, lists 90 of them. Besides this he has contributed chapters to two books, and his work has drawn citations from other researchers. James Watson, a recipient of the Nobel Prize in Physiology or Medicine in 1962, cited one of Dey's papers in his 2013 lecture at University of California, Los Angeles to commemorate the 60th anniversary of the discovery of double helical structure DNA, which was later published as an article in Lancet in 2014. He also holds a Patent Cooperation Treaty and his aforementioned US patent, as well as two Indian patents, and has guided students in their master's and doctoral studies.

Dey was the Sectional Secretary of the 91st Indian Science Congress held in 2003; he was also associated with the organization of the Indo‑US Symposium on Recombinant DNA Technology and Its Application in Drug Discovery held at BITS, Pilani in February 1999 and the workshops on Molecular Basis of Drug Discovery and on Molecular Modeling and Pharmainformatics held at National Institute of Pharmaceutical Education and Research, Mohali in 2005. He was the regional associate editor of the Journal of Biopharmaceutics and Biotechnology in 2006 and is a former member of the editorial boards of the now defunct Open Parasitology Journal of Bentham Science Publishers and Scientific Reports of Nature Publishing Group. He is a reviewer for Molecular Biology International, a journal of the Hindawi Publishing Corporation, the Diabetes journal of the American Diabetes Association, The FASEB Journal, the Molecular Medicine journal, FEBS Letters, the Journal of Molecular Cell Biology, Antimicrobial Agents and Chemotherapy, the British Journal of Pharmacology, Comparative Biochemistry and Physiology, Expert Opinion on Biological Therapy, the Indian Journal of Medical Research, and Experimental Parasitology. He has also served as an adviser or consultant to pharmaceutical companies such as Orchid Chemicals and Pharmaceutical Ltd., TCG Lifesciences (former Chembiotek Research International) and DSM Anti-Infectives.

== Awards and honors ==
The Council of Scientific and Industrial Research awarded him Shanti Swarup Bhatnagar Prize, one of the highest Indian science awards in 2003. The same year, he also received the National Bioscience Award for Career Development of the Department of Biotechnology, followed by the OPPI Award of the Organisation of Pharmaceutical Producers of India in 2005. He became an elected fellow of two major Indian science academies in 2007: the National Academy of Sciences, India and the Indian National Science Academy. He received two honors in 2008: the CDRI Award of the Central Drug Research Institute and the J. C. Bose National Fellowship of the Department of Biotechnology. In 2011, he was awarded the inaugural Honor Lecture Award by Madras Diabetes Research Foundation. He is also a life member of the Society of Biological Chemists, India.

== Selected bibliography ==
=== Book chapters ===
- Shio Kumar Singh (editor); G. C. Majumdar, S. C. Dey, S. Saha, K. Das, D. Nath. A. Maiti, S. Dey, D. Roy; S. Mitra, A. Rana, J. Chakrabarty, S. Das, A. Bhoumik, S. Banerjee, M. Mandal, B. S. Jaiswal, P. Ghosh, A. Das, D. Bhattacharyya, S. R. Dungdung (chapter authors) (4 September 2015). "Role of Sperm Surface Molecules in Motility Regulation". Mammalian Endocrinology and Male Reproductive Biology. CRC Press. pp. 197–. ISBN 978-1-4987-2736-5.
- Shio Kumar Singh (editor); S. C. Dey (chapter author) (4 September 2015). Mammalian Endocrinology and Male Reproductive Biology. CRC Press. pp. 14–. ISBN 978-1-4987-2736-5.

=== Articles ===
- Hira Lal Goel, Chinmoy Sankar Dey (2002). "Insulin stimulates spreading of skeletal muscle cells involving the activation of focal adhesion kinase, phosphatidylinositol 3-kinase and extracellular signal regulated kinases". Journal of Cellular Physiology. 193 (2): 187–198. doi:10.1002/jcp.10161. PMID 12384996. S2CID 21928362.
- Hira Lal Goel, Chinmoy Sankar Dey (2002). "Role of protein kinase C during insulin mediated skeletal muscle cell spreading". Journal of Muscle Research & Cell Motility. 23 (4): 269–277. doi:10.1023/A:1022028808806. PMID 12630700. S2CID 28801734.
- Bisht B, Goel HL, Dey CS (2007). "Focal adhesion kinase regulates insulin resistance in skeletal muscle". Diabetologia. 50 (5): 1058–69. doi:10.1007/s00125-007-0591-6. PMID 17333113.
- Bisht B, Dey CS (2008). "Focal Adhesion Kinase contributes to insulin-induced actin reorganization into a mesh harboring Glucose transporter-4 in insulin resistant skeletal muscle cells". BMC Cell Biol. 9 (48): 48. doi:10.1186/1471-2121-9-48. PMC 2551595. PMID 18771597.
- Gupta A, Bisht B, Dey CS (2011). "Peripheral insulin-sensitizer drug metformin ameliorates neuronal insulin resistance and Alzheimer's-like changes". Neuropharmacology. 60 (6): 910–20. doi:10.1016/j.neuropharm.2011.01.033. PMID 21277873. S2CID 20315718.
- Amit Gupta, Chinmoy Sankar Dey (2012). "PTEN, a widely known negative regulator of insulin/PI3K signaling, positively regulates neuronal insulin resistance". Mol Biol Cell. 23 (19): 3882–3898. doi:10.1091/mbc.E12-05-0337. PMC 3459864. PMID 22875989.
- Aakash Gautam Mukhopadhyay, Chinmoy Sankar Dey (2016). "Reactivation of flagellar motility in demembranated Leishmania reveals role of cAMP in flagellar wave reversal to ciliary waveform". Scientific Reports. 6 37308. Bibcode:2016NatSR...637308M. doi:10.1038/srep37308. PMC 5110981. PMID 27849021.

=== Patents ===
- Chinmoy Sankar Dey (30 May 2006). "Skeletal cell model to screen anti-diabetic compounds". US Patent No. 7052910. Justia Patents.

== See also ==
- Recombinant DNA
- Protein kinase C
- GLUT4
- Metformin
