= Delhi Institute of Pharmaceutical Sciences and Research =

Indian research institute

- Type: Public
- Established: 1964; 59 years ago
- Parent institution: Delhi Pharmaceutical Science and Research University
- Academic affiliations: Delhi Pharmaceutical Science and Research University (2015 - present); University of Delhi (1972 - 2015)
- Chancellor: Lieutenant Governor of Delhi
- Vice-Chancellor: N/A
- Location: Mehrauli-Badarpur Road, Puspvihar Sector 3, New Delhi, 110017, India; 28.5163313°N 77.2245365°E
- Website: www.dipsar.ac.in

Delhi Institute of Pharmaceutical Sciences and Research (DIPSAR) is an institution located in New Delhi, India. It is providing teaching and research in pharmaceutical sciences. It is affiliated with Delhi Pharmaceutical Science and Research University (DPSRU). The university is Ranked 25th by National Institutional Ranking Framework 2023 in Pharmacy.Mohd Mazhar is the first student of PhD in Delhi Pharmaceutical Sciences and Research University.

== History ==
The institute was founded in 1964 as Department of Pharmacy of Delhi Polytechnic (later renamed Delhi College of Engineering, now Delhi Technological University) and was located in Kashmiri gate, Delhi. In 1972, it was converted into the College of Pharmacy and moved to the campus of the Pusa Institute. Finally, in 1979 it moved to its present campus in Pushp Vihar. In 2004 it was named as Delhi Institute of Pharmaceutical Sciences & Research, affiliated to University of Delhi. Following the establishment of Delhi Pharmaceutical Science and Research University (DPSRU) it was made a constituent college of DPSRU, which operates from the same building.

== Ranking ==
University and college rankings

Pharmacy – India
- NIRF (2022): 22

It was ranked 25 by the National Institutional Ranking Framework (NIRF) pharmacy ranking of 2023.

== Courses offered ==
1. D.Pharma
2. B.Pharma
3. M.Pharma - Pharmacology, Pharmaceutics, Hospital Pharmacy, Quality Assurance, Clinical Research, Pharmaceutical Chemistry, Herbal Drug Technology, Pharmaceutical Management
4. MBA - Pharmaceutical Management
5. Ph.D.
6. BPT
7. Bachelors in sports science
8. Bachelors of business administration [BBA] Healthcare

== Departments ==
- Quality Assurance
- Clinical research
- herbal
- Hospital pharmacy
- Pharmaceutical chemistry
- Pharmaceutical management
- Pharmaceutical sciences
- Pharmaceutics
- Pharmcognosy
- Pharmacology

== See also ==
- Jamia Hamdard
- National Institute of Pharmaceutical Education and Research, S.A.S. Nagar
- National Institute of Pharmaceutical Education and Research, Raebareli
- Birla Institute of Technology and Science, Pilani
- Birla Institute of Technology, Mesra
- Faculty of Pharmacy, Uttar Pradesh University of Medical Sciences
- Panjab University
