= National Institutes of Pharmaceutical Education and Research =

Pharmaceutical sciences group in India

National Institute of Pharmaceutical Education and Research
- Other name: NIPER or NIPERs (plural)
- Type: Public Pharmacy school Institutes of National Importance
- Established: 1998
- Budget: ₹200.07 crore (US$21 million) (2025–26)
- Location: 7 cities in India; Ahmedabad; Guwahati; Hajipur; Hyderabad; Kolkata; S.A.S. Nagar; Raebareli
- Language: English

National Institute of Pharmaceutical Education and Research (NIPERs) are a group of national level universities of pharmaceutical sciences or Pharmacy school in India. The Government of India has declared the NIPERs as Institutes of National Importance. They operate as autonomous bodies under the aegis of Department of Pharmaceuticals, Ministry of Chemicals and Fertilizers.

Location of the seven functioning NIPERs

== Institutes ==
National Institutes of Pharmaceutical Education and Research
#	Institute	City	State	Founded	Website
1	NIPER, S.A.S. Nagar	Mohali	Punjab	1998	niper.gov.in/
2	NIPER, Ahmedabad	Ahmedabad	Gujarat	2007	niperahm.ac.in/
3	NIPER, Hajipur	Hajipur	Bihar	2007	niperhajipur.ac.in/
4	NIPER, Hyderabad	Hyderabad	Telangana	2007	niperhyd.ac.in/
5	NIPER, Kolkata	Kolkata	West Bengal	2007	niperkolkata.edu.in/
6	NIPER, Guwahati	Guwahati	Assam	2008	niperguwahati.ac.in/
7	NIPER, Raebareli	Raebareli	Uttar Pradesh	2008	niperraebareli.edu.in/

== Future institutes ==
The Eighth Finance Commission in its meeting held on 20 January 2011, recommended establishing NIPER, Madurai, Tamil Nadu and for which, the TN Govt has already allocated 116 acres of land near Thirumohur at Madurai. Even after this, the project has been non-starter till now. various request has been raised by various Members of the Parliament Representing Madurai Constituency over years to set up the NIPER, Madurai campus but still the project hasn't started. The courses planned for Madurai Niper includes Pharma Informatics, Pharmaceutics Biotechnology and Pharmacology, and Toxicology and Biotechnology. In 2021, It has been proposed by the pharmaceutical department to the department of expenditure for setting up a new NIPER campus at Madurai along with four other locations in India. A case has been filed at Madurai Bench of Madras High court in 2022 for setting up the NIPER, Madurai.

In February 2015, Arun Jaitley, the Minister of Finance, announced three new NIPERs, in Rajasthan, Chhattisgarh and Maharashtra. In March 2015 Devendra Fadnavis, the Chief Minister of Maharashtra, announced that the Maharashtra location will be in Nagpur. In November 2015, Ananth Kumar, the then Minister of Chemicals and Fertilizers, announced that the location of the Rajasthan institute will be in Jhalawar. In July 2016, Kumar verified the plans for Rajasthan, Chhattisgarh and Maharashtra, and in the next financial year he mentioned plans for NIPERs in Madhya Pradesh, Andhra Pradesh and Karnataka. Contrary to a previous announcement made in January 2016 a NIPER was not planned in Visakhapatnam, Andhra Pradesh. As of November 2018, the plans for NIPER Nagpur are still on paper only.

In April 2016, the Government of Odisha requested that a NIPER in Bhubaneswar, Odisha be considered.

In June 2019 D. V. Sadananda Gowda, the Minister of Chemicals and Fertilizers, informed the parliament that they had no plan to open new NIPERs in the coming years. He also informed that the ministry has dropped the idea of setting up 3 new NIPERs in Maharashtra, Rajasthan and Chhattisgarh.

== Academics ==
=== Postgraduate program ===
- Master of Science (Pharma.) This 2-year full-time program is offered in different disciplines.
  - Pharmaceutical Analysis
  - Natural Products
  - Medicinal Chemistry
  - Pharmacology & Toxicology
  - Pharmacoinformatics
  - Pharmaceutics
  - Biotechnology
  - Pharmacy Practice
  - Medical Devices
  - Regulatory affairs (Pharma)
- Master of Technology (Pharma.)
- Master of Business Administration (Pharma.)

=== Doctoral/Fellowship ===
- Doctor of Philosophy (PhD) - This program is offered in both full-time and part-time
  - Medicinal Chemistry
  - Natural Products
  - Pharmacology & Toxicology
  - Pharmaceutics
  - Pharmacy Practice
  - Pharmacoinformatics
  - Biotechnology
  - Medical Devices
