= Prasad V. Bharatam =

Indian academic

Prasad V Bharatam
- Born: 12 October 1962 (age 63); Rajahmundry, Andhra Pradesh, India
- Education: Visva-Bharati University; University of Hyderabad
- Scientific career
- Fields: Pharmacoinformatics
- Workplaces: National Institute of Pharmaceutical Education and Research
- Doctoral advisor: Eluvathingal Devassy Jemmis

Prasad V. Bharatam is Professor of Medicinal Chemistry at the National Institute of Pharmaceutical Education and Research, S.A.S. Nagar, India. His area of research include Quantum Medicinal Chemistry, Pharmacoinformatics, synthesis of computationally designed molecules (anti-diabetic belonging to class PPAR-γ agonist and biguanides), drug delivery using dendrimers.

== Awards ==
- Fellowship of Alexander von Humboldt Stiftung, Bonn
- IBM Faculty Award
- Fellowship of Royal Society of Chemistry(FRSC), London
- Chem. Research Society of India – Medal
- Indian Academy of Sciences Fellowship
- Ranbaxy Research Award
- OPPI Scientist Award
- Fellowship of Andhra Pradesh Akademi of Sciences
