= Akums Drugs and Pharmaceuticals =

Indian pharmaceutical company

Akums Drugs and Pharmaceuticals Limited
- Company Logo
- Trade name: Akums
- Type: Public
- Traded as: NSE: AKUMS BSE: 544222
- ISIN: INE09XN01023
- Industry: Pharmaceuticals, CDMO & Skincare
- Founded: 2004 ; 21 years ago
- Headquarters: Delhi, India
- Area served: Worldwide
- Key people: Sandeep Jain (Founder and Managing Director) Sanjeev Jain (Founder & Managing Director)
- Products: Pharmaceuticals; Nutraceuticals; Ayurvedics; APIs; Cosmetics; Dermatologys; Skincares
- Revenue: ▲₹1,538.75 crore (US$160 million) (FY24)
- Total assets: ▲₹2,095.43 crore (US$220 million) (FY24)
- Number of employees: 10,000+ (2024)
- Subsidiaries: Akumentis Healthcare Limited.; Pure And Cure Healthcare Private Limited.
- Website: www.akums.in

Akums Drugs and Pharmaceuticals Limited (Akums Group) is an Indian pharmaceutical Contract Development and Manufacturing Organization (CDMO) that serves both domestic and multinational pharmaceutical companies. The company was established in 2004 and became publicly listed on 6 August 2024.

== History ==
Akums was founded by Sanjeev Jain and Sandeep Jain in 2004, who currently serve as the managing directors of the company. The company has 12 manufacturing facilities for various formulations and two facilities for producing active pharmaceutical ingredients (APIs). It produces tablets, capsules, soft gels, dry syrups, liquid orals, and other pharmaceutical products. Akums also operates four research and development (R&D) centers in India. In 2020, the company received an investment of Rs 500 crore from Quadria Capital.

In April 2022, the company acquired a manufacturing facility from Ankur Drugs and Pharmaceuticals Limited. In May, the company received a license to manufacture and commercialize Bempedoic acid, a drug used to lower cholesterol. Two of the company's units in Haridwar were granted European GMP certification. One unit produces solid oral dosage forms, such as tablets and hard gelatin capsules, while the other manufactures large and small volume parenterals, including vials, ampoules, eye drops, and FFS formulations. In August 2024, the company went public with a listing on the Bombay Stock Exchange and the National Stock Exchange. In May 2025, Akums received a patent for an extended-release combination formulation of Doxylamine and Pyridoxine, indicated for the management of nausea and vomiting in pregnancy.

In July and September 2025, Akums received Good manufacturing practice (GMP) certifications for its manufacturing facilities in Haridwar, including from Brazilian Health Regulatory Agency and the Eurasian Economic Union (EAEU) for its hormonal therapy unit. In January 2026, two of its facilities in Haridwar, Uttarakhand, received European Union GMP certification issued by the Bulgarian Drug Agency (BDA).

In November 2025, a 20-year patent for Dual Release Gastro-Resistant Composition effective from 19 November 2022, was granted to the company under the Patents Act, 1970.

In February 2026, it received approval from the United Kingdom’s Medicines and Healthcare products Regulatory Agency (MHRA) to market rivaroxaban, an anticoagulant, in the country.

== Partnerships ==
In October 2024, Akums partnered with Microcore Research to use natural eggshell membrane (NESM) in the development of dietary supplements for joint and connective tissue health.

In November 2023, Akums entered into a MoU with Delhi Pharmaceutical Sciences and Research University to collaborate on research and product development for patients in India.

== See also ==
- Pharmaceutical companies
- Pharmaceutical industry in India
