= Undergraduate education =

Academic programs up to the level of a bachelor's degree

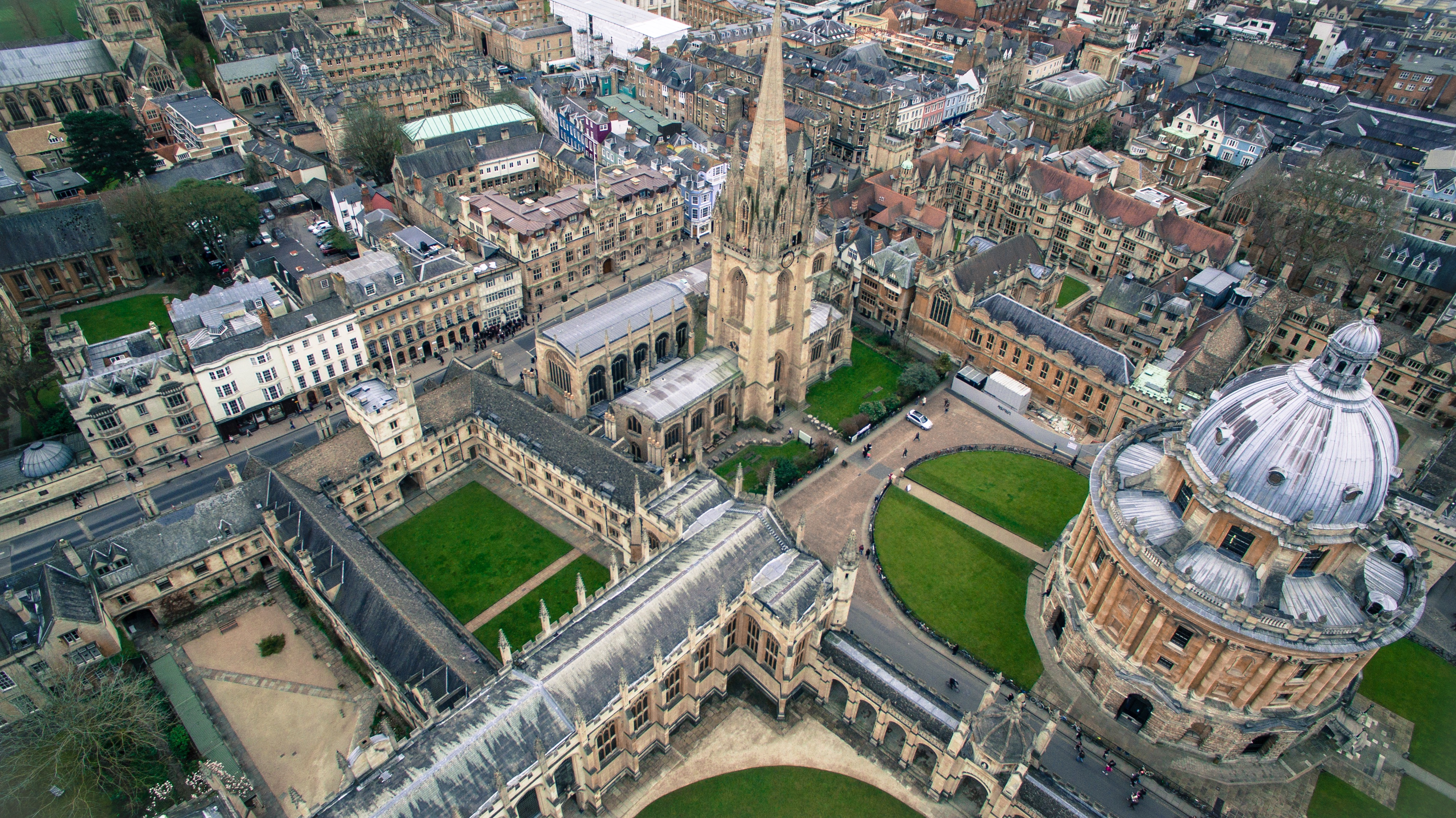
Drone View of University of Oxford, widely regarded as one of the most prestigious universities in the world

Undergraduate education is education conducted after secondary education and before postgraduate education. It typically includes all postsecondary programs up to the level of a bachelor's degree. For example, in the United States, a student pursuing an associate or bachelor's degree is known as an undergraduate student while a student who is pursuing a higher degree (masters, doctorate) is a graduate student. Upon completion of courses and other requirements of an undergraduate program, the student would earn the corresponding degree. In some other educational systems, undergraduate education is postsecondary education up to and including the level of a master's degree; this is the case for some science courses in Britain and some medicine courses in Europe.

== By country ==
=== Brazil ===
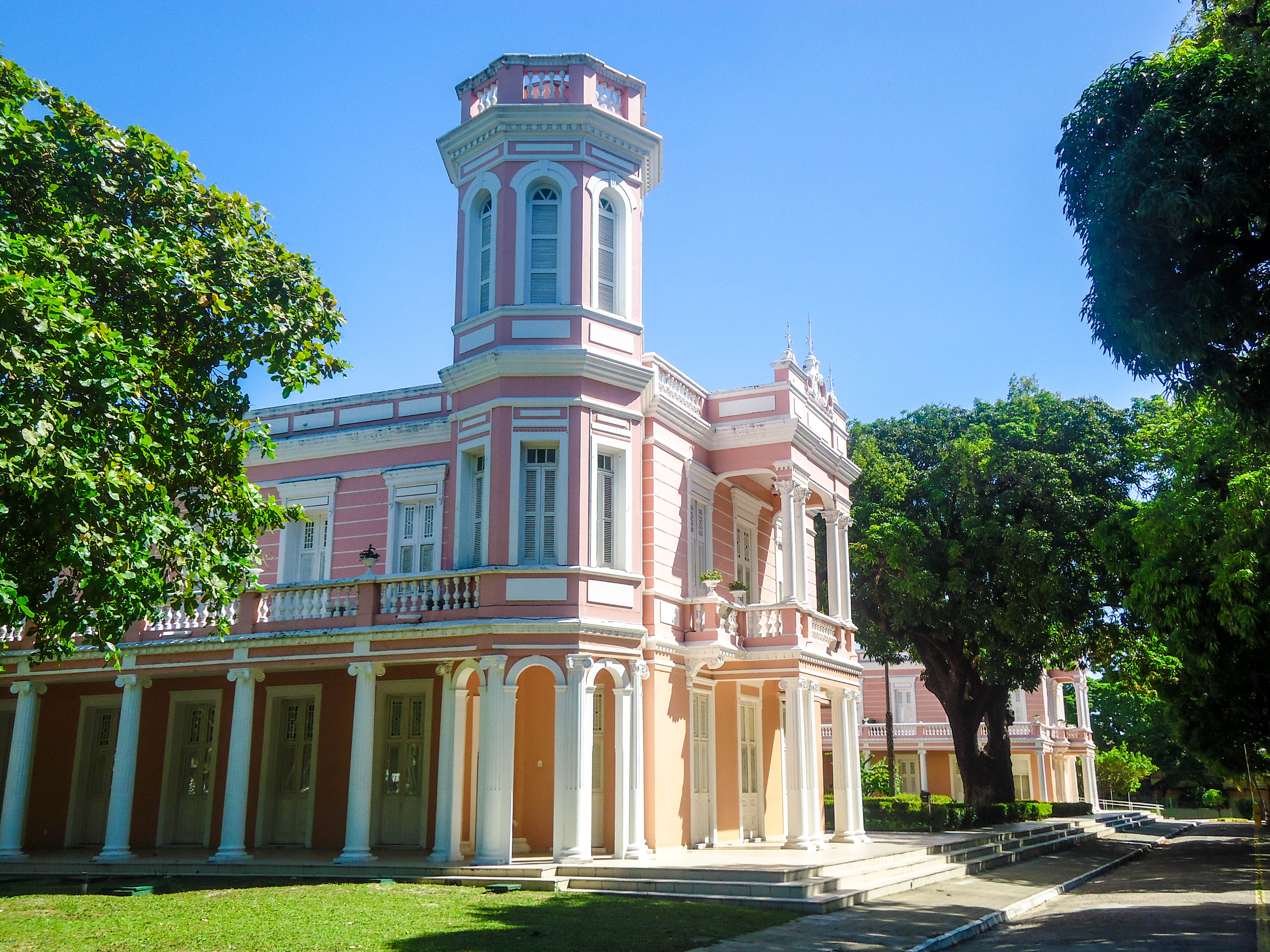
Federal University of Ceará in Ceará, Brazil

Brazil follows the major traits of the continental European system; free public schools are available from kindergarten up to postgraduation, both as a right established in Article 6, caput of the Brazilian Constitution and as a duty of the State in Article 208, Items I, IV and V, of the Brazilian Constitution. Students choose their specific course of studies before joining the university. Admission to university is obtained by means of a competitive entrance exam known as Vestibular (a concept somewhat similar to the Baccalauréat in France). A later system introduced in 2009, adopted by most federal universities, uses the high school national examination (ENEM) result as part or a replacement of the Vestibular grade. Depending on the chosen course, upon graduating the student is granted: a technologist diploma, three years to complete, a bachelor's degree's diploma, which usually takes four or, in the case of Law, Veterinary, Geology and Engineering, five years to complete; or a professional diploma, which normally require five or, in the case of medicine, six years to complete.

=== United States ===
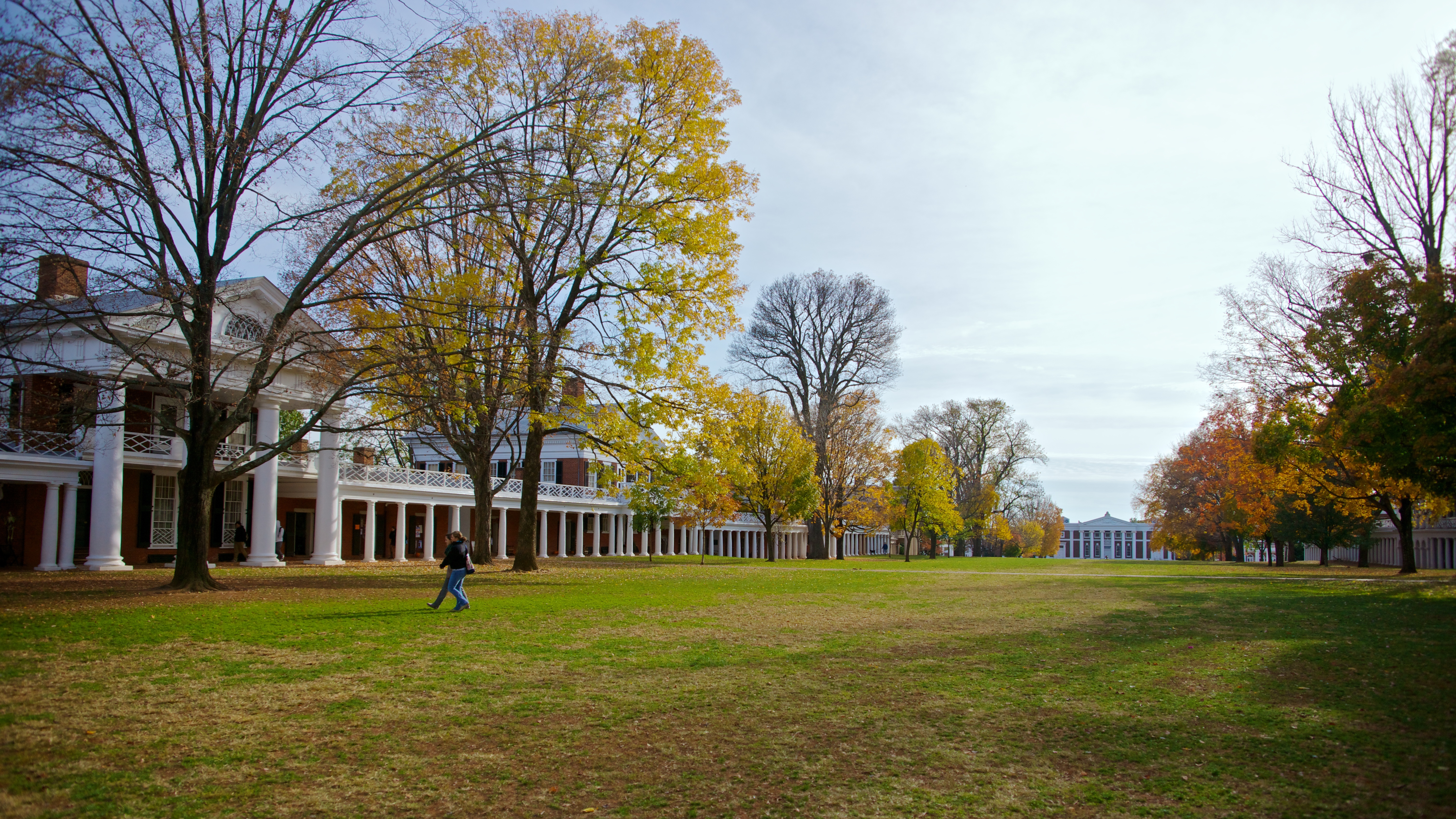
The University of Virginia, founded in 1819 by Thomas Jefferson in Charlottesville, Virginia

In the United States, undergraduate education refers to a student who is studying for a bachelor's degree. The most common bachelor's degrees are Bachelor of Arts (BA/AB) and Bachelor of Science (BS/SB), but other degrees such as Bachelor of Fine Arts (BFA), Bachelor of Music (BM), Bachelor of Social Work (BSW), Bachelor of Engineering/Bachelor of Science in Engineering (BEng/BSE), Bachelor of Science in Nursing (BSN), Bachelor of Business Administration/Bachelor of Science in Business Administration (BBA/BSBA), Bachelor of Education (Ed.B), Bachelor of Liberal Arts (BLA/ALB), and Bachelor of Architecture (BArch) are also possible. Most commonly, these degrees require four years of full-time study after high school. An additional accolade to the bachelor's degree is the Honours degree.

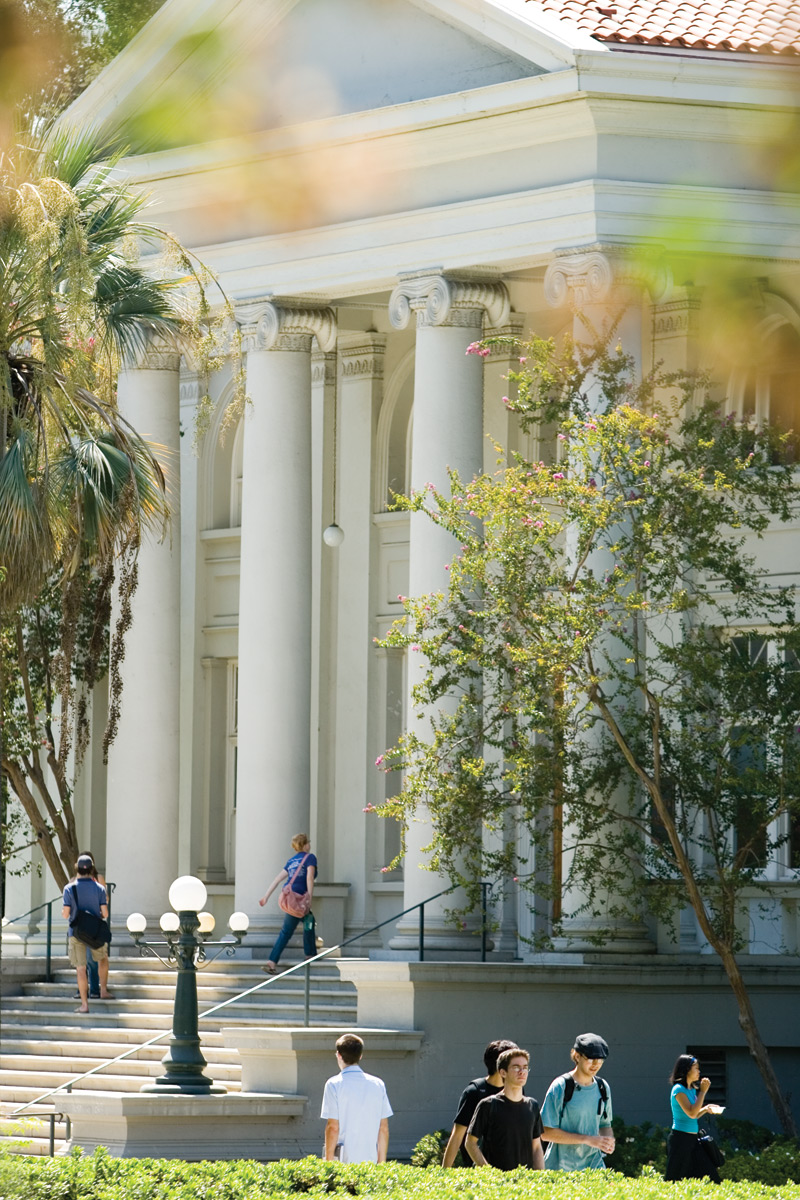
Pomona College in Claremont, California, a liberal arts college offering undergraduate education

Unlike in the British model, degrees in law and medicine are not offered at the undergraduate level and instead are completed at a graduate level after earning a bachelor's degree. Neither field specifies or prefers any undergraduate major, though medical schools require a set of courses that must be taken before enrollment.

Students can also choose to attend a two-year community college before further study at a four-year college or university. In most states, community colleges are operated either by a division of the state university or by local special districts of the relevant state. Community colleges award associate degrees of different types, some intended to prepare students to transfer to four-year institutions (e.g. Associate of Arts (AA), Associate of Science (AS)), and others intended to provide vocational skills and training for students wishing to enter into or advance in a profession. In some states, considerable attention has been given to ensure that community college courses prepare students for the continuation courses they will encounter at the local college; this process of bringing courses into sequence is called articulation. Some community colleges have automatic enrollment agreements with a local college or university, where the community college provides the first two years of study, and the university provides the remaining years of study, sometimes all on one campus. The community colleges award associate degrees, while universities and colleges award the bachelor's. However, some community colleges, such as Brazosport College in Lake Jackson, Texas, offer bachelor's degrees along with associate degrees. Conversely, some universities, such as the University of Delaware, also award associate degrees.

In the United States, "college" and "university" are terms used differently in different states; New York's terminology is especially confusing (see University of the State of New York). A university is usually larger than a college, and has programs at the graduate level, but the distinction is not clear-cut. Some colleges (like Smith College) award graduate degrees, for example, and some colleges are larger than some universities. Some states have requirements a college must meet before it is allowed to call itself a university. Institutions seeking to grow have pursued various steps to turn two-year junior colleges into community colleges, community colleges into four-year colleges, awarding baccalaureate degrees, sometimes while still a community college, and colleges into universities, with graduate (post-baccalaureate) programs.

=== Asia ===
==== Bangladesh ====
In Bangladesh, 4-year undergraduate programs are known as Degree (Pass) courses and four-year undergraduate programs are known as Honours courses.

==== Hong Kong ====
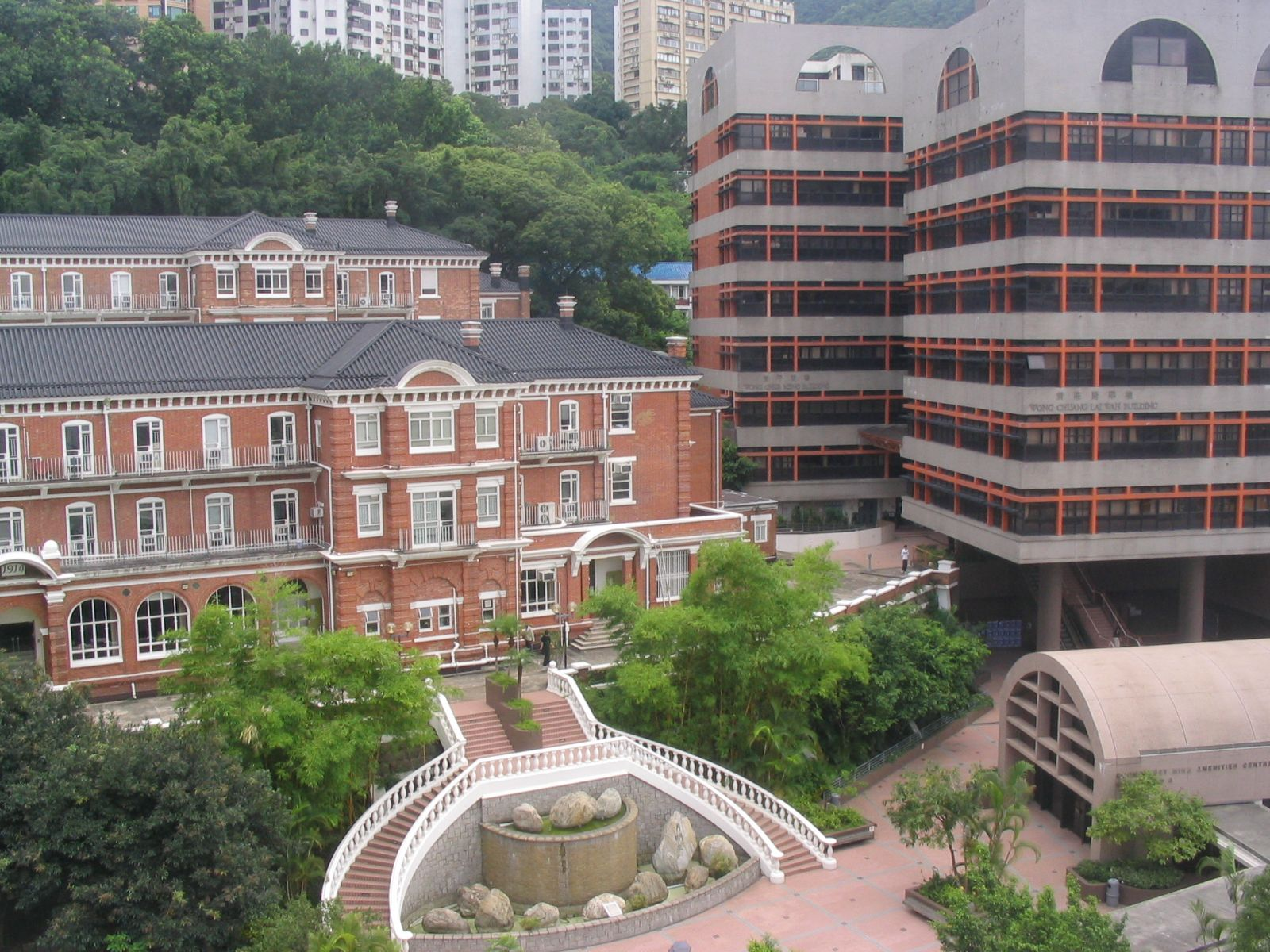
The University of Hong Kong

In Hong Kong, the English system is followed. Students sit for the Certificate of Education examinations at around sixteen years of age, and the Advanced-level, or A-level examinations at around eighteen, then follow by three years of undergraduate education, except for a few specific fields, such as medicine, nursing and law. This is due to be changed, with five-year secondary education and two-year matriculation examination combined and shortened to six years matriculation, and undergraduate education lengthened to four years. Students may be able to receive general education in their first years in universities, more akin to the North American system. The first batch of students under the new system will enter universities in 2012.

Alternatives are undergraduate certificates or diplomas, with some equivalent to associate degree in educational level.

==== India ====
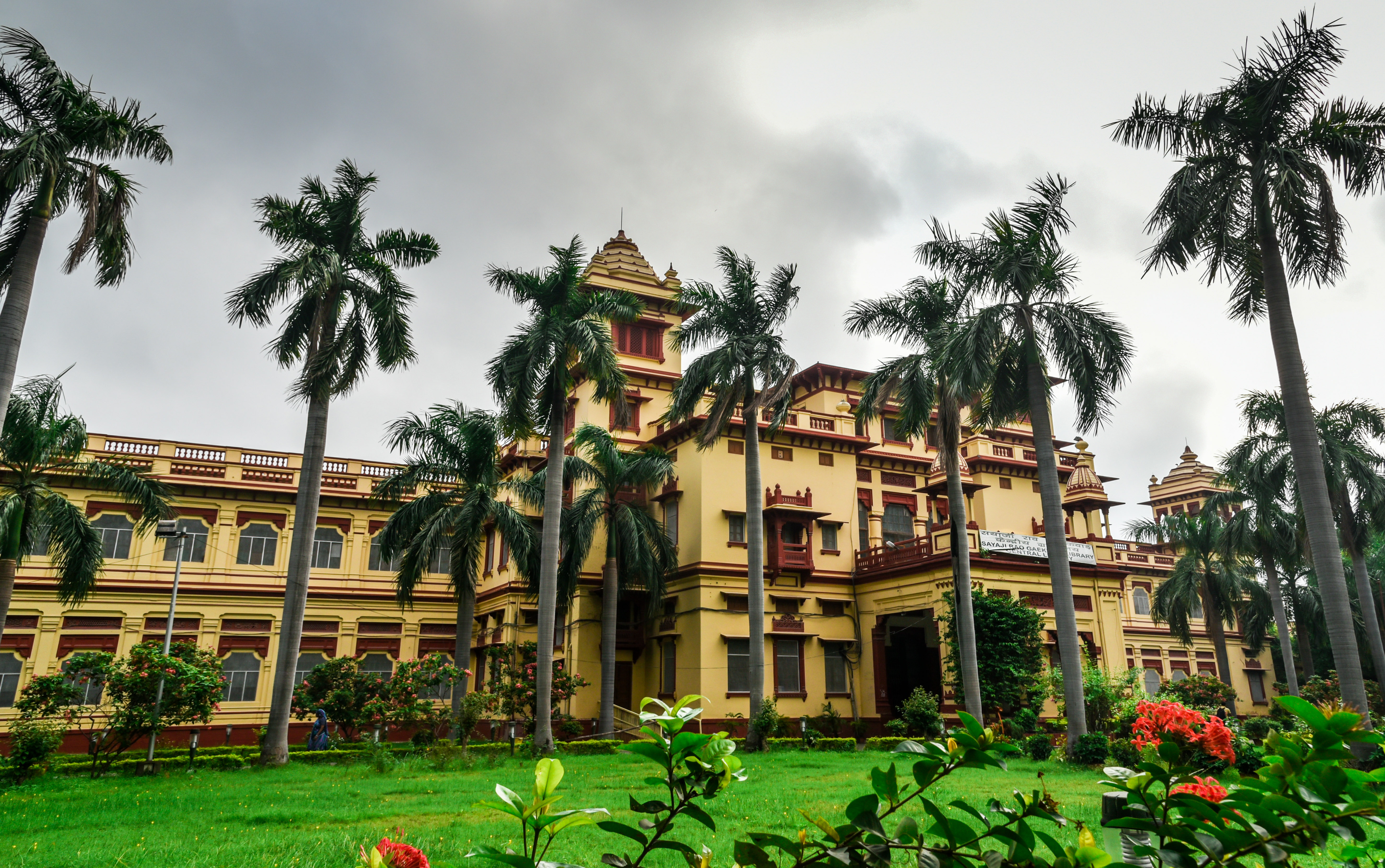
Banaras Hindu University in Varanasi is the largest residential university in Asia.

India's higher education system is the third largest in the world, next to the United States and China. The main governing body at the tertiary level is the University Grants Commission (UGC), which enforces its standards, advises the government, and helps coordinate between the center and the state. Accreditation for higher learning is overseen by 15 autonomous institutions established by the UGC.

In India, the graduation system is classified into two parts: Undergraduate (UG) and Postgraduate (PG). It takes three or four years to complete an undergraduate degree. The three-year undergraduate programs are mostly in the fields of humanities or social sciences (B.A.), commerce or business administration (B.Com/BBA), natural sciences or mathematics (B.Sc) etc., and the four-year programs are mostly in the fields of technology or engineering (B.Tech/B.E.), pharmaceutical sciences (B.Pharm), agriculture etc. For law (LLB) and architecture (B.Arch), the typical study duration is five years, whereas medicine (MBBS) generally takes 5.5 years (including one year of Compulsory Medical Internship). While a standalone LLB degree is three years long, it requires a prior bachelor's degree; to streamline this, universities commonly offer 5-year integrated programs directly after school, such as BA LLB, etc. The possessor of the first UG is referred to as graduate and that of the PG degree as post-graduate. Other than UG and PG there are various 1 to 2 year diploma courses available.

Indian higher education system has expanded at a fast pace by adding nearly 20,000 colleges and more than 8 million students in a decade from 2000–01 to 2010–11. As of 2026, India has over 1338 universities, with a break up of 54 central universities, 495 state universities, 126 deemed universities, 455 private universities, 7 Institute under State Legislature Act, and 173 Institutes of National Importance which include IIMs, AIIMS, IITs, IIITs, IISERs and NITs among others. Other institutions include 52,627 colleges as government degree colleges, private colleges, standalone institutes and post-graduate research institutions, functioning under these universities as reported by the MHRD in 2020. Colleges may be Autonomous, i.e. empowered to examine their own degrees, up to PhD level in some cases, or non-autonomous, in which case their examinations are under the supervision of the university to which they are affiliated; in either case, however, degrees are awarded in the name of the university rather than the college.

==== Japan ====
Undergraduate education in Japan requires four years, which is divided into two stages: associate degree's for the first two years and bachelor's for the second half.

Bachelor's degrees are awarded only by universities and NIAD-QE.

==== Pakistan ====
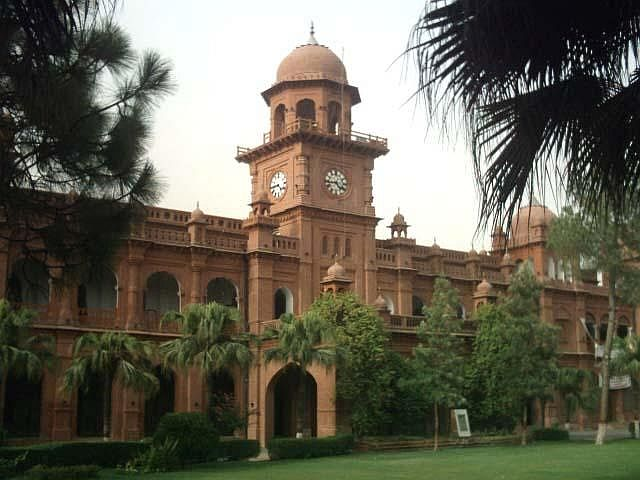
The University of the Punjab in Lahore, Pakistan

In Pakistan, it generally requires four years to complete a Bachelor's degree in Arts, Sciences, Dentistry, Engineering or Business Administration such as BA, BS, BDS, BE/BS/BSc Engineering or BBA and five years for bachelor's degrees in medicine (MBBS), Physiotherapy (DPT), Pharmacy (Pharm.D) and Architecture (B.Arch.) after successfully completing 12 years of schooling. 4 years bachelor's degree is offered in various universities of Pakistan such as COMSATS Institute of Information Technology (CIIT), University of Engineering and Technology, Lahore (UET Lahore), University of Engineering and Technology, Taxila (UET Taxila), National University of Sciences and Technology (NUST), Lahore University of Management Sciences (LUMS) and National University of Computer and Emerging Sciences (NU).

The modern educational system comprises the following five stages: The Primary school lasting five years for children 5–10 years old in grades one to five; a Middle school of three years for children 10 to 13 years old, covering grades six through eight; a two-year secondary, or Matriculation consists of grades nine and ten, for children 13 to 15 years old; a two-year higher secondary, or Intermediate college, leading to an F.A. in arts or F.Sc. in science; and a fifth stage covering college and university programs leading to baccalaureate, professional, master's and doctorate degrees. The pre-primary or preparatory classes, called kachi (literally, unripe) or Nursery school, were formally integrated into the education system in 1988.

=== Europe ===
==== United Kingdom, excluding Scotland ====
Students in England, Wales, and Northern Ireland may usually enter university from the age of eighteen, often having studied A-levels and thus having had eleven to thirteen years of schooling. Occasionally students who finish A-Level or equivalent qualifications early (after skipping a year in school on the grounds of academic giftedness) may enter below this age but large universities are now setting minimum age limits of 16 or 17 after a number of well publicised "child prodigies" were found to be emotionally and mentally unprepared for university life.

Applications for undergraduate courses in UK higher education are made through the Universities and Colleges Admissions Service (UCAS).

For their first degree, most students read for the degree of bachelor, which usually takes three years; however, in the sciences and engineering, integrated courses covering both undergraduate level and advanced degree level leading to the degree of master, usually taking four years and including a research project or dissertation, are popular. Given the integrated nature of these programs someone who gains a master's degree via an integrated program is not usually admitted to the degree of bachelor.

Master's degrees conferred after extended programs are not to be conflated with the degree of Master of Arts conferred at Oxbridge and Dublin, which is not a substantive qualification, but reflects the ancient practice of those three universities of promoting Bachelors of Arts to Masters of Arts (and thus full membership of the university) six or seven years after matriculation.

Honours degrees and integrated master's degrees are awarded with 1st, upper 2nd, lower 2nd or 3rd class honours. If a student passes the course but fails to do so sufficiently well for third class honours to be awarded he will be awarded with an ordinary degree. It is possible to use the abbreviation "Hons" after the degree postnominals to indicate that the degree has been passed with honours and is not an ordinary degree.

Many universities offer sandwich courses or an extramural year, which offer work placements for a short period of time in a relevant industry before students complete their studies. Taking a sandwich course may make the course last a year longer than it would otherwise.

With very few exceptions, nearly all universities with the power to award degrees are heavily state financed. However, they also rely on tuition fees set by the government at a maximum index-linked level, repayable after graduation contingent on attaining a certain level of income, and with the state paying all fees for students from the poorest backgrounds. UK students are generally entitled to student loans for maintenance with repayment contingent on income. Unlike in other European countries, the British government does not own the universities' assets and university staff are not civil servants. United Kingdom universities are therefore better described as autonomous, intellectually-independent institutions with public funding, rather than public universities per se. The crown does not control syllabi, with the exception of teacher training. The crown restricts the power to award degrees to those with a royal charter, in the case of traditional universities, or authorization from the Secretary of State for Universities, in the case of modern universities. Universities accredited in foreign countries, such as Richmond University are, however, free to operate.

==== European Bologna systems ====
In many countries, the English distinction between a bachelor's and master's degree is being introduced by the Bologna process. Under the new Bologna reform, universities in Europe are introducing the Bachelor level (BA or BS) degree, often by dividing a five-year Master-level program into two parts (three-year Bachelor's + two-year Master's), where students are not obligated to continue with the second Master's-degree part. These new bachelor's degrees are similar in structure to British bachelor's degrees.

If there is a separate undergraduate degree, higher degrees (License, Master, Doctorat) can be gained after completing the undergraduate degree. In the traditional German system, there were no undergraduate degrees in some fields, such as engineering: students continued to Master's level education without any administrative breakpoints, and employers would not consider half-finished master's degrees.

The Bachelor's phase in The Netherlands can be fulfilled either at university or at a university of applied sciences. These two institutions differ from each other in the level students learn abstract concepts. Education at universities is aimed at research and fundamental principles while at universities of applied sciences it concentrates on applying knowledge in a vocation. Universities of applied sciences typically do not offer master and PhD programs.

==== Scotland ====
Students in Scotland usually enter university in the year they turn eighteen, with many starting at seventeen; courses take a year longer than in the rest of the UK.

At some older universities, the degree of Master of Arts is conferred in the arts subjects after four years, while the newer universities instead confer the degree of Bachelor of Arts. The degree of Master of Arts conferred by the Ancient Scottish Universities is equivalent to the degree of Bachelor of Arts at other universities and does not require the level of study necessitated for the other degrees of master awarded by these universities. The degree instead reflects the ancient traditions of these universities.

In the sciences, students usually read for the degree of bachelor, which usually takes four years. However, as with the rest of the UK, integrated master's degrees are popular in science and engineering, although they last for five years in Scotland. Degree classification is the same as in the rest of the UK.

==== Other European systems ====
In many other, particularly continental European systems, an "undergraduate" degree in the American sense does not exist. Because students are expected to have received a sound general education at the secondary level, in a school such as a gymnasium or lycee, students in Europe enroll in a specific course of studies they wish to pursue upon entry into a university. In the US, students only specialize in a "major" during the last years of college. Specializing in a field of study upon entry into a university means most students graduate after four to five years of study. The fields available include those only taught as graduate degrees in the US, such as law or medicine.

In the traditional system of Germany, there is a vocational degree (diploma FH) that is similar in length, and is also considered an academic degree. Though it is designed as a specialist degree, in contrast to the Diplom degree at university, which claims to be more generalist. Germany itself, however, is currently abolishing the legal distinction between Fachhochschule and university. They are both translated as university and they both provide bologna-compliant and equivalent postgraduate degrees.

Not obligatory and sometimes applied at universities in the Netherlands are the propaedeutic exams. The entire curriculum of the first two semesters of the bachelor's programme is part of the propaedeutic exams. In most bachelor's studies, students are required to obtain their propaedeutic certificate within three semesters after starting the course. A propaedeutic certificate also counts as a requirement for participating in a university level bachelor's study. The propaedeutic exams have the purpose of assessing whether a student has the appropriate capacities in order to complete the course.

At some Swedish universities (such as the Royal Institute of Technology), PhD courses are sometimes referred to as "graduate courses", whereas courses for other students (up to master level) sometimes are referred to as "undergraduate courses". The system at many Finnish universities is similar.

In the French system, the first degree of tertiary education was reached two years after the baccalauréat. Amongst these degrees the university-delivered DEUG has disappeared, whereas Diplôme universitaire de technologie, Brevet de Technicien Supérieur or classe préparatoire aux grandes écoles still exist. According to the Bologna process, this two-year curriculum will be replaced by the three-year licence, yet existing.

== See also ==
- Academic degree – College or university diploma
- Undergraduate research – Research partaken by undergraduate students
- Bologna Process – System for compatibility of higher education qualifications in the European region
- Doctorate – Academic or professional degree
- Higher education – Academic tertiary education
- Master's degree – Postgraduate educational qualification
- Master's degree in Europe
- Adult learner, also known as Mature student – Student who is an adult and returning to or starting full-time education
- Officer candidate school – Type of military school
- Postgraduate education – Phase of higher education
- Reserve Officers' Training Corps – Military officer training program in the US
- Undergraduate degree – Degree earned by a person who has completed undergraduate courses
- University and college admission – Process through which students enter tertiary education
