= Thirumohoor Kalamegaperumal temple =

Vishnu temple in Madurai

Tirumogoor Kalamegaperumal Temple
- Thirumohoor Chakaratalvar Temple
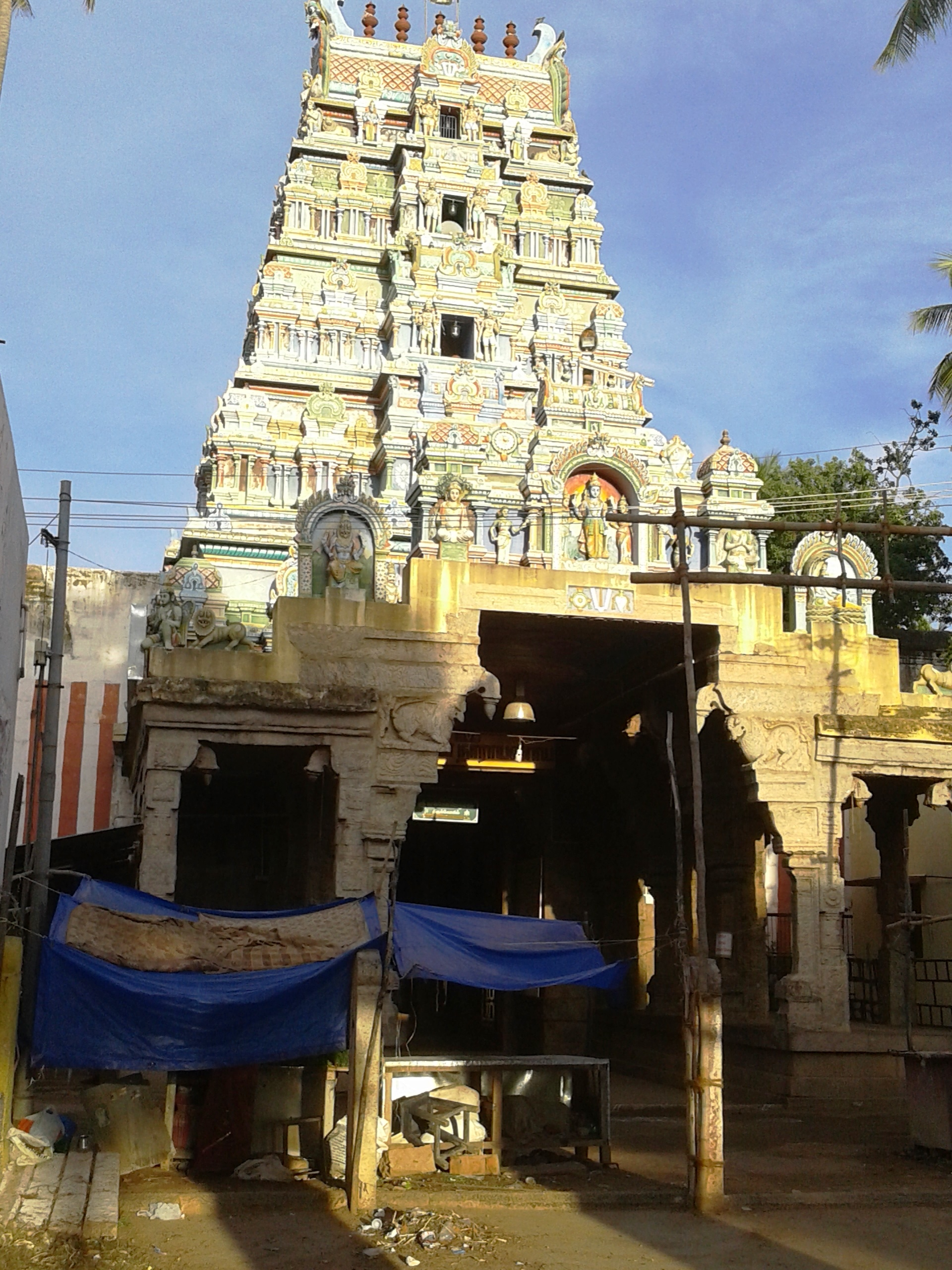
- Kalamegaperumal

- Location in Tamil Nadu

Religion
- Affiliation: Hinduism
- District: Madurai
- Deity: Kalamegaperumal (Vishnu); Mohanavalli Thayar (Lakshmi)
- Festivals: Brahmotsavam; Vaikunta Ekadasi; Gajendra Moksham; Thirukalyanam; Krishna Jayanthi
- Features: Tower: Kethaki Vimanam; Temple tank: Kshirabtha Pushkarini

Location
- Location: Madurai
- State: Tamil Nadu
- Country: India
- Coordinates: 9°57′3.69″N 78°12′25.56″E

Architecture
- Type: Dravidian architecture

Website
- kalamegaperumaltemple.tnhrce.in

The Thirumohoor Kalamegaperumal Temple (also known as Thirumohoor or Tirumogoor temple) is a Hindu temple near Melur, Madurai district in the Indian state of Tamil Nadu, to the Hindu god Vishnu. Constructed in the Dravidian style of architecture, the temple is glorified in the Nalayira Divya Prabandham, the early medieval Tamil canon of the Alvar saints from the 6th–9th centuries CE. It is one of the 108 Divya Desams dedicated to Vishnu, who is worshipped as Kalamega Perumal and his consort Lakshmi as Mohanavalli Thayar. As per Hindu legend, the presiding deity is believed to have appeared as the divine enchantress Mohini to allure the asuras to support the devas, the celestial deities. The temple is also known as Mohanapuram and Mohanakshetram.

A granite wall surrounds the temple, enclosing all its shrines and three of its four bodies of water. The temple has a five-tiered rajagopuram, the temple's gateway tower and a huge temple tank in front of it. The temple is believed to have been built by the Pandyas, with later additions from the Madurai Nayaks.

The temple is maintained and administered by the Hindu Religious and Endowment Board of the Government of Tamil Nadu.

== Legend ==
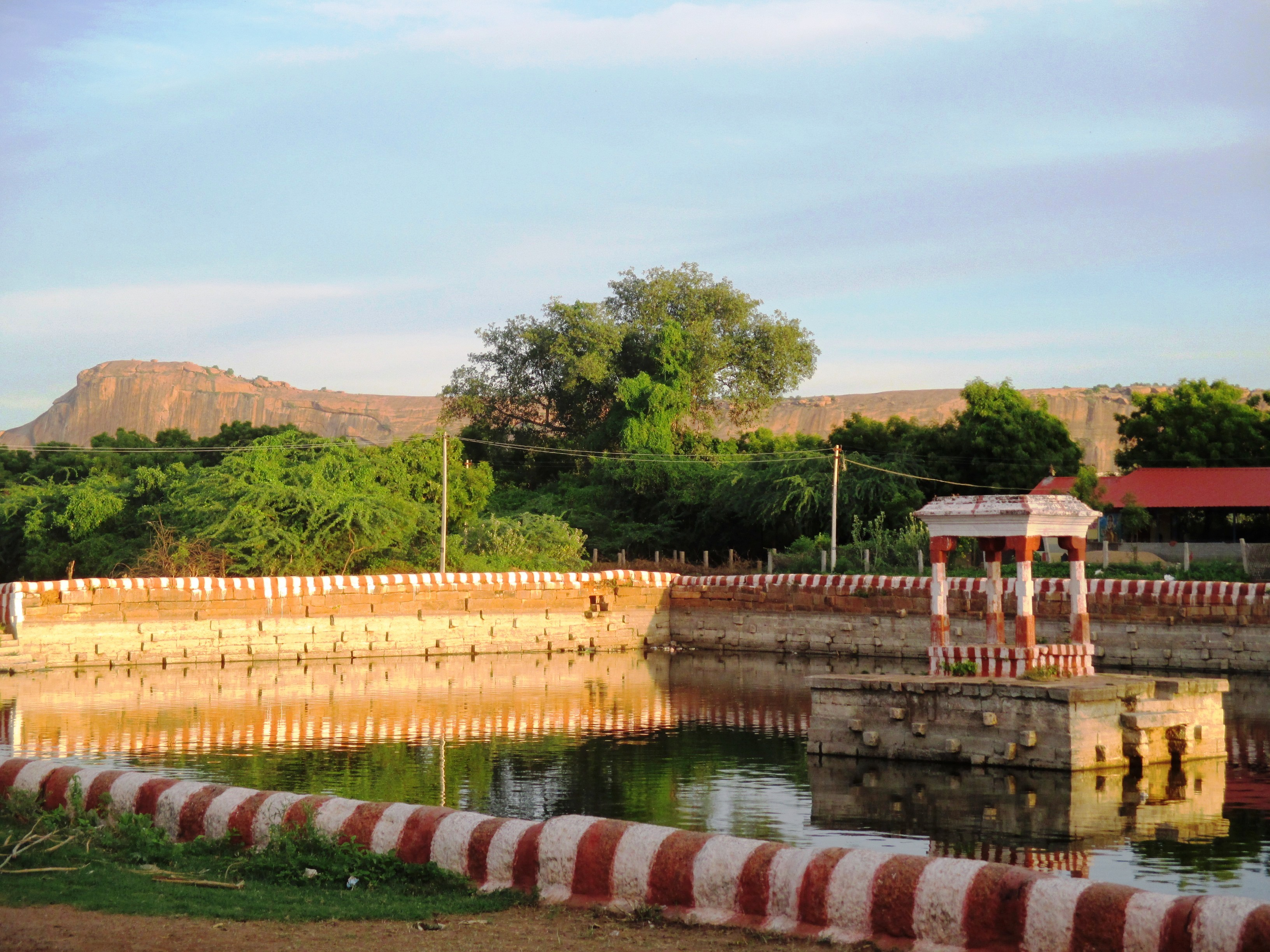
Temple tank

According to a legend, there was a war between the devas (gods) and asuras (demons) before the churning of the Ocean of Milk for amrita (elixir of eternal life). The asuras were able to overpower the devas, and thus the devas sought Vishnu's help. During the Samudra Manthanam, Vishnu appeared as Mohini to lure the asuras and denied them the elixir, allowing the devas to gain the upper hand. It is believed that Thirumohur is the place of the event.

== History ==
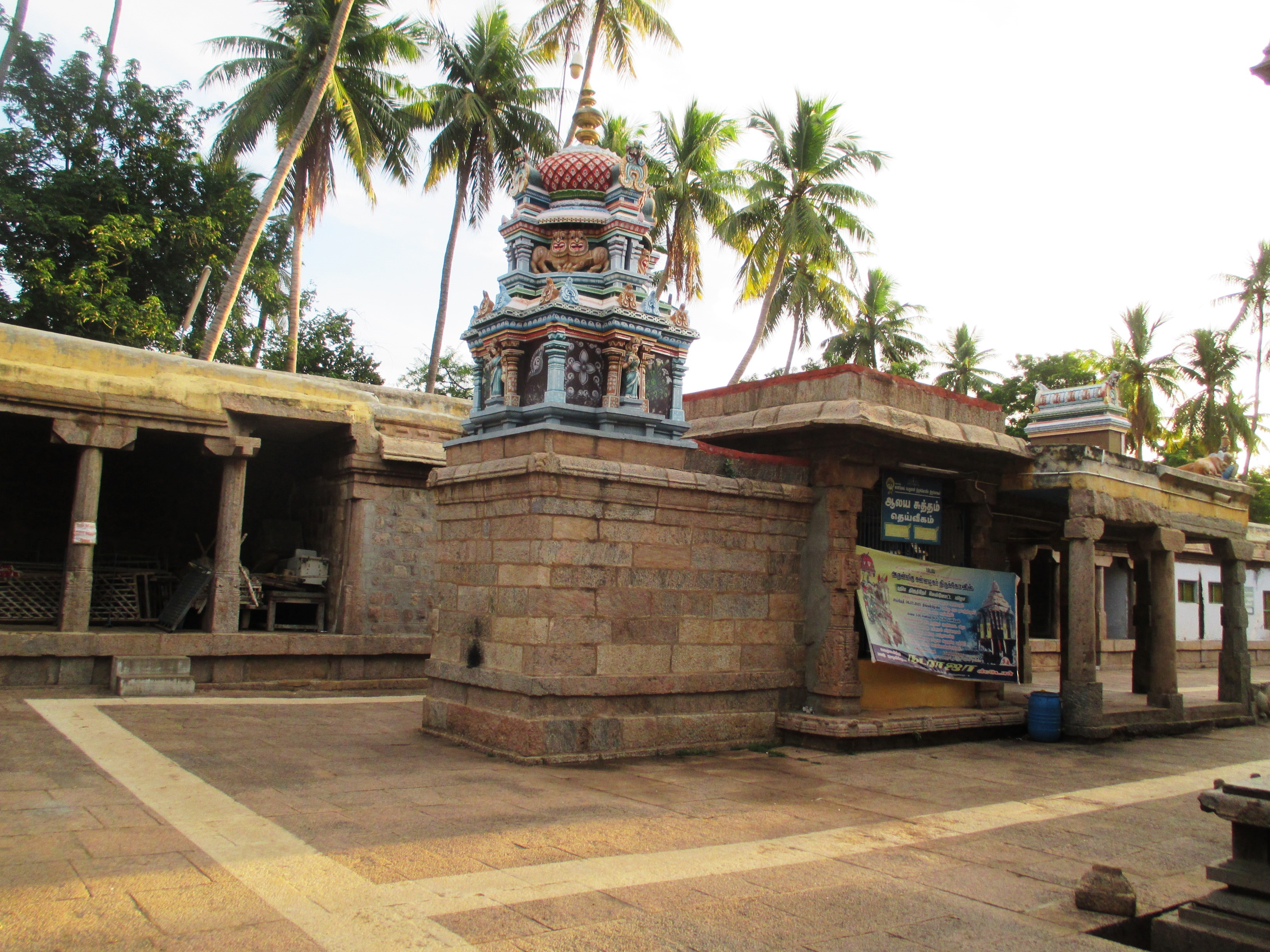
Sri Andal shrine

Sangam literature details about this place being prosperous during the time. The documentation from Ptolemy (c. CE 100 – c. 170) also makes reference to this place. Inscription from the temple - South Outer wall's inside - Archaeological report on Epigraphy - 330 of 1918 - and Tamil Nadu State Archaeology's Madurai District Inscriptions - Vol. I - page no. 229 - Sl. no. 141 of 2003 - identifies the builder of the temple as sri Kaala Maegam alias Kaangaeyan during the reign of Sadaiya Varman Sundhara Pandiyan (Later Pandiya king) in his regnal year 7 + 1 (i.e. after the 7th year was over and the eighth year was in progress) which is identified as CE 1259. This inscription besides identifying the above speaks of an endowment of ponds and adjoining areas duly specifying the boundaries of the land. The current structure is believed to have been built by the Madurai Nayaks. During the later part, there were additions made by the Marudu brothers, whose images are also housed in the temple. Thirumohur was an impregnable fort during the period of British. During the Carnatic Wars, there was an attempt made by a Muslim general, but it was repulsed by the local devotees. The inscriptions from the period of Nayaks have been recorded by the Archaeological survey.

== Architecture ==
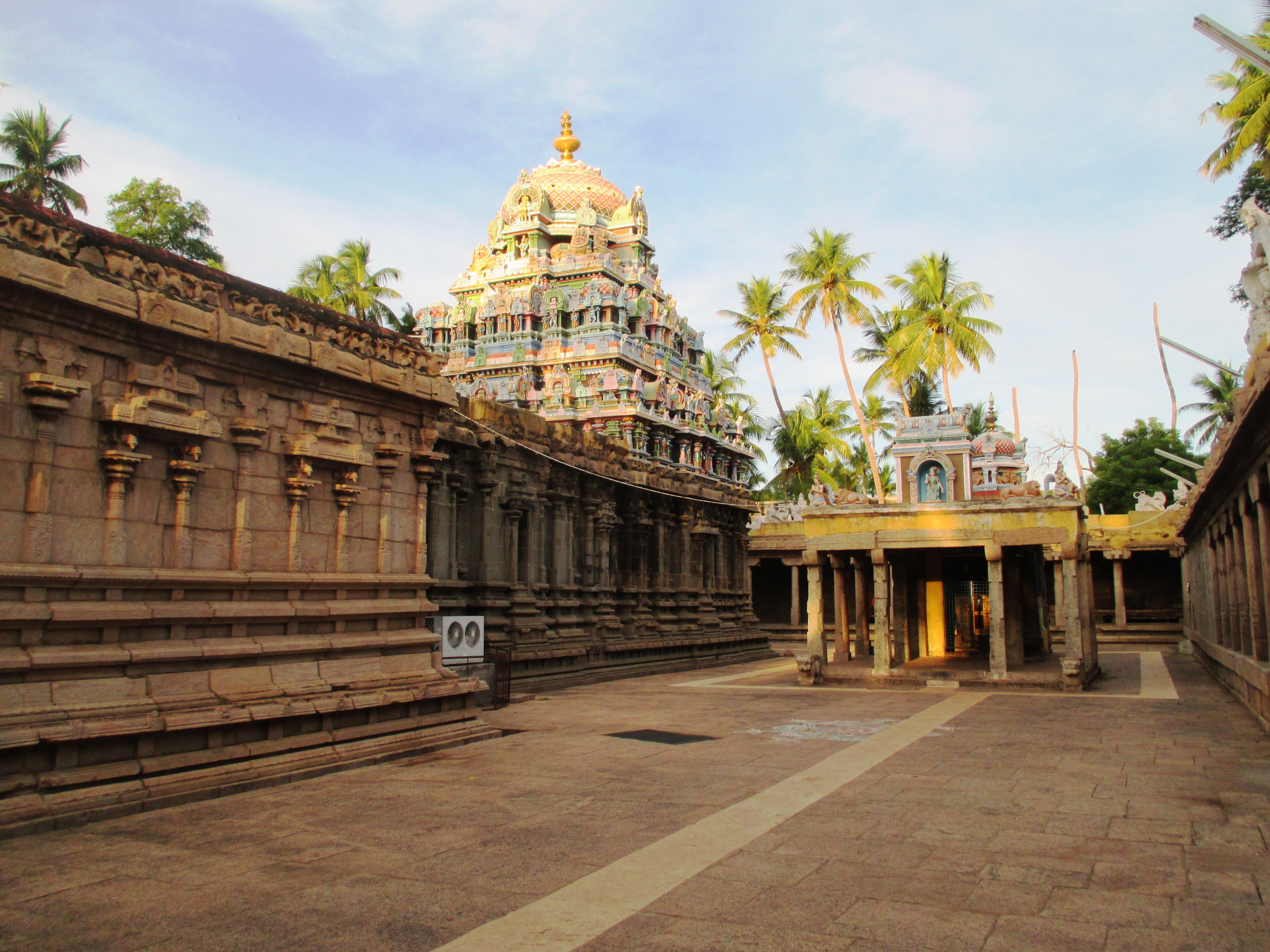
Shrines

The temple is located in Tirumohur, a village located 20 km (12 mi) away from Madurai. The temple is situated on a 2.5-acre (10,000 m^{2}) land area, and has a 5 tier rajagopuram. The temple is more than 2000 years old and has been referred to in akanaṉūṟu, Padhitrupathu, maduraikanchi and also in one of the five great epics of Tamil literature, silappatikaram. There are four prakarams (closed precincts of a temple) inside the temple. The main deity (mulavar) is Kalamegaperumal in panchayudha kolam and in a standing posture, Thayar - Mogavalli, Utsavar - Thirumogur Aabthan, Theertham - Kshirabtha Pushkarini, Thala Viruksham - Vilvam and Vimanam - Kethaki Vimanam. The Prathanasayana appearance of the main deity is not found anywhere in 108 Divya Desam temples. The temple has a five-tiered rajagopuram (gateway tower). There are columned pillars in the hall leading to the Garuda hall, which also has a small gopuram. The sanctum houses the shrine of Kalamegha and also has the images of Bhudevi and Sridevi. The major feature is that the unlike other temples, the goddesses do not touch the feet of the presiding deity. A separate shrine accommodates the image of Anantasayi Vishnu. The consort of the presiding deity, Tirumohurvalli (also called Mohanavalli) is housed in a separate shrine.

To the front of the image of the Sudarshana Chakra stands the deity Chakratalvar, and present on the back is Narasingha Perumal, situated amidst 48 apsaras. Inside the six circles that are present, there are 16 weapons with 154 letters present. The letters are believed to be text from the Bhijakshara Mantra.

== Literary mention ==
The temple is glorified in the verses of Nalayira Divya Prabandham by Tirumangai Alvar and Nammalvar. The temple is classified as a Divya Desam, one of the 108 Vishnu temples that are mentioned in the book. Manavala Mamunigal, Kalamegha Pulavar, Tiruninravur Tirumalai and Pillai Perumal Iyengar have composed verses on the deity. Out of the eighteen Puranas, Brahmanda Purana and Matsya Purana make specific mention about Thirumohur.
