= National Institute of Pharmaceutical Education and Research, Kolkata =

Pharmacy School in Kolkata, India

- Type: Public Pharmacy School
- Established: 2007; 19 years ago
- Budget: ₹26.77 crore (US$2.9 million) (2024–25)
- Chairman: Padmanabhan Balaram
- Director: Dr. U. S. N. Murty (additional charge)
- Academic staff: 31 (2025)
- Students: 285 (2025)
- Postgraduates: 206 (2025)
- Doctoral students: 79 (2025)
- Location: Kolkata, West Bengal, India; 22°34′49″N 88°23′56″E
- Campus: Urban
- Acronym: NIPER-Kolkata
- Website: niperkolkata.edu.in

National Institute of Pharmaceutical Education and Research, Kolkata (NIPER Kolkata) is an Indian public pharmaceutical research university, located in Kolkata, West Bengal, India. As one of the seven National Institutes of Pharmaceutical Education and Research (NIPERs) it is granted the Institute of National Importance status. It offers 2-year MS (Pharm.) programmes and doctoral programmes in pharmaceutical sciences. On 2016 Institute pact with Sanofi India to promote academic excellence and research in the areas of pharmaceuticals and consumer healthcare products, to cater to the current and future needs of the pharmaceutical industry. In August 2023 Union Minister Dr. Mansukh Mandavya laid the foundation stone for the new campus of the institute at Panihati in North 24 Parganas district of West Bengal. He announced ₹78 Cr. for the construction of a permanent campus and ₹100 Cr. to build the centre of excellence. The institute will set up a centre of excellence in flow reactors and continuous production at a cost of ₹100 Crore from the Department of Pharmaceuticals.

== Organisation and administration ==
Institutes Governing Body ensures that institute maintains standards in pharmaceutical education and research, adapting to the evolving needs of the industry. This body oversees the strategic direction and policies of the institute. The Director is the chief executive officer responsible for the overall administration, academic programs, and research initiatives. Various committees are formed to address specific areas such as academic affairs, research development, and student welfare.

== Academics ==
NIPER Kolkata offers a range of academic programs, including undergraduate, postgraduate, and doctoral programs. These programs cover various specializations within pharmaceutical sciences.,

=== Admission Process ===
Admission process for the Bachelor's degree in Pharmacy at the NIPER, Kolkata is designed to ensure that candidates need to appear for the NIPER Joint Entrance Examination (NIPER JEE). For postgraduate programs, Admissions are primarily based on the Graduate Pharmacy Aptitude Test (GPAT) scores then Based on the scores obtained in GPAT and/or NIPER JEE, candidates are shortlisted for further evaluation. Shortlisted candidates may be called for a personal interview or counseling session, depending on the program.

=== Undergraduate Programs ===
B.Pharm (Bachelor of Pharmacy).

=== Postgraduate Programs ===
M.Pharm (Master of Pharmacy) Specializations include Pharmaceutical Chemistry, Pharmacology, Pharmaceutics, Quality Assurance, Pharmaceutical Technology. M.Tech (Master of Technology): Focused on areas such as Pharmaceutical Technology (Formulations), Pharmaceutical Technology (Process Chemistry), Pharmaceutical Technology (Biotechnology).

=== Doctoral Programs ===
Ph.D. in Pharmaceutical Sciences: research areas including drug discovery, formulation development, and pharmacology.

=== Academic Units ===
Departments of NIPER Kolkata
- Medicinal chemistry
- Natural product
- Pharmacology and Toxicology
- Pharmacoinformatics
- Pharmaceutics
- Medical device
- Pharmaceutical Analysis
- Biopharmaceutical

== Ranking and reputation ==
National Institute of Pharmaceutical Education and Research, Kolkata was ranked 24th in India by the NIRF pharmacy ranking in 2024.

University rankings

Pharmacy – India
- NIRF (2024): 24
