= Experimental Parasitology =

- Discipline: Parasitology
- Language: English
- Edited by: Anton Aebischer, Bernd Kalinna

Publication details
- History: 1951–present
- Publisher: Elsevier
- Frequency: Monthly
- Open access: Hybrid
- Impact factor: 1.859 (2013)

Standard abbreviations
- ISO 4: Exp. Parasitol.

Indexing
- CODEN: EXPAAA
- ISSN: 0014-4894 (print); 1090-2449 (web)
- LCCN: 56001649
- OCLC no.: 644496773

Links
- Journal homepage; Online access

Experimental Parasitology is a monthly peer-reviewed scientific journal covering the field of parasitology. It is published by Elsevier and was established in 1951. The main topics covered are the physiology, immunology, biochemistry, and molecular biology of eukaryotic parasites, and the interaction between the parasite and its host, including chemotherapy against parasites. The editors-in-chief are Anton Aebischer (Robert Koch Institute, Berlin, Germany) and Bernd Kalinna (University of Melbourne, Australia).

== Abstracting and indexing ==
The journal is abstracted and indexed by:

- Abstracts on Hygiene and Communicable Diseases
- BIOSIS Previews
- Elsevier BIOBASE
- Chemical Abstracts
- Current Contents/Life Sciences
- EMBASE
- FRANCIS
- Helminthological Abstracts
- Index Medicus/MEDLINE/PubMed
- PASCAL
- Protozoological Abstracts
- Science Citation Index
- Tropical Diseases Bulletin
- Scopus
- The Zoological Record

According to the Journal Citation Reports, the journal has a 2013 impact factor of 1.859, ranking it 17th out of 36 journals in the category "Parasitology".
