= National Institute of Pharmaceutical Education and Research, Hajipur =

Indian research university in Bihar, India

- Type: Public
- Established: 2007
- Director: Prof. Ruckmani Kandasamy
- Location: Hajipur, Bihar, India
- Campus: Urban
- Nickname: NIPER Hajipur
- Website: niperhajipur.ac.in

National Institute of Pharmaceutical Education and Research, Hajipur (NIPER Hajipur) is a public pharmaceutical education and research university located in Hajipur, Bihar, India. Established in 2007, it is one of the seven National Institutes of Pharmaceutical Education and Research (NIPERs) under India's Ministry of Chemicals and Fertilizers. The institute offers Post Graduate degree in pharmaceutical sciences. Like all other NIPERs, it has the Institute of National Importance status.

== History ==
The institution started functioning from November 2007 and was inaugurated by former union Minister Sri Ram Vilas Paswan and the Director Dr. Pradeep Das, RMRIMS-Patna. Till October, 2018 the institute was under the mentorship of RMRIMS-Patna and Dr. Pradeep Das was the Project Director of NIPER-Hajipur.

== Organization and administration ==
=== Governance ===
Prof. Ruckmani Kandasamy, Director,NIPER Hajipur has taken the charge since June, 2025. NIPER-Hajipur has 14 faculties and 23 non-teaching staff currently.

=== Departments ===
Pharmacology and toxicology

Department started functioning from 2018. The department has fully developed laboratory along with animal house facility.

Areas of Research

1. Cognito- behavioral studies including Fluorosis-induced neurodevelopmental disorders.
2. Anticancer research with electrochemical therapy, immunotherapy and chemotherapy approaches
3. Role of extracellular vesicles (Exosomes) in drug-tolerant persister cells and its contribution to cancer-initiating cells in breast cancer.
4. To study the molecular reprogramming landscape of pre and post neoadjuvant chemotherapy in Gastric Cancer and its therapeutic implications in Humanized mice for the 3D organoid model.

Department of Biotechnology

The department started functioning from 2007. It has already awarded 10 PhD degree and 6 students have submitted.

Areas of Research

1. Chromosome organization and regulation of transcription in pathogenic organisms
2. mechanism of drug resistance and development of effective drugs against resistant microbes
3. Application of functionalized and conjugated gold Nanoparticles for improved antimicrobial efficacy.
4. Green synthesized gold nanoparticles as antifungal and anti-parasitic agents.

Department of Pharmacy Practice

It started functioning from 2007. The department has affiliation with major hospitals for clinical and applied pharmacy. The department has already awarded 1 PhD degree and 1 student has submitted.

Areas of Research

1. Exploration of nutritional and immunological factors along with quality of life in patients of visceral leishmaniasis.
2. Exploration of cardiovascular risk along with quality of life and KAP study in patients with HIV/VL co-infection in Bihar
3. Evaluation of Efficacy and Toxicity of Concurrent Capecitabine with Radiation in Locally Advanced Rectal Cancer Patients of Bihar.
4. Assessment of Risk Factors and Management of Post Kala Azar Dermal Leishmaniasis

== Academics ==
=== Admissions ===
Every year in June and July NIPER conducts national level entrance examinations for admissions to its M.S.(Pharm)/M. Pharm. and PhD programs and the doctoral programs are further screened by personal interview. The candidates are required to have qualified the Graduate Aptitude Test in Engineering (GATE) or now Graduate Pharmacy Aptitude Test (GPAT) in a suitable subject area. The MS course is 2 years with 4 semesters. Students with individual fellowship can apply directly to their choice of NIPERs for PhD.
