= National Institute of Pharmaceutical Education and Research, Raebareli =

Public university in Raebareli, Uttar Pradesh, India

- Type: Institute of National Importance
- Established: 2008 (18 years ago)
- Director: Prof. Shubhini A Saraf
- Location: Lucknow, Uttar Pradesh, India; 26.7241682°N 80.9038014°E
- Campus: Transit
- Nickname: NIPER-R
- Website: niperraebareli.edu.in

National Institute of Pharmaceutical Education and Research, Raebareli (NIPER-Raebareli) established 2008, is an Indian public pharmacy research university running from a transit campus at Lucknow, Uttar Pradesh. It a part of the seven National Institutes of Pharmaceutical Education and Research, under India's Ministry of Chemicals and Fertilizers. The institute offers Masters and Doctoral degrees in pharmaceutical sciences. As an Institute of National Importance it plays an important role in the Human Resource Development for the ever growing Indian Pharmaceutical industry, which has been in the forefront of India’s science-based industries with wide ranging capabilities in drug manufacturing.

NIPER-Raebareli has been ranked 14th according to the NIRF rankings in Pharmacy Category in the year 2024.

The institute offers a 2-year PG degree course; MS (Pharm.) in 3 disciplines ( Medicinal Chemistry, Pharmacology and Toxicology, Pharmaceutics).(CDRI-Lucknow)Central Drug Research Institute is a mentor institute for NIPER-R and Doctoral program in pharmaceutical sciences with innovation in drug delivery, pharmacology and Bio-pharmaceutics is one of the pivotal criteria. Facilities are available with CDRI which provides training to the 2nd year masters students and research scholars.

== Campus ==
Institute is running from a transit campus situated in Lucknow's Heera Lal Yadav Institute of Technology and Management campus.

== Collaborations ==
- Indian Institute of Technology Kanpur
- Sanjay Gandhi Postgraduate Institute of Medical Sciences
- Delhi Pharmaceutical Science and Research University
- Indian Institute of Technology Roorkee
- IDPL Haridwar
- FFDC Kannauj
- Era University
- Babasaheb Bhimrao Ambedkar University

== See also ==
- Faculty of Pharmacy, Uttar Pradesh University of Medical Sciences
- All India Institute of Medical Sciences, Raebareli
