= Thirumohur =

- Neighbourhood
- Thirumohur, Madurai (Tamil Nadu)
- Coordinates: 9.9497°N 78.2070°E
- Country: India
- State: Tamil Nadu
- District: Madurai district
- Elevation: 162 m (531 ft)

Languages
  - Official: Tamil, English
- Time zone: UTC+5:30 (IST)
- PIN: 625107
- Other Neighborhoods: Madurai, Othakadai, Mattuthavani
- Municipal body: Madurai Municipal Corporation
- District Collector: Dr. S. Aneesh Sekhar, I. A. S.
- Website: https://madurai.nic.in

Thirumohur is a neighbourhood in Madurai district of Tamil Nadu state in the peninsular India.

Thirumohur is located at an altitude of about 162 m above the mean sea level with the geographical coordinates of 9.949700°N 78.207000°E.

Thirumohoor Kalamegaperumal temple which is one of the 108 Divya Desams, is located in Thirumohur and is under the control of Hindu Religious and Charitable Endowments Department in Tamil Nadu.
