= All India Institute of Medical Sciences, Raebareli =

Medical college and hospital in Raebareli, Uttar Pradesh

- Motto: svāsthyam sarvārthasadhanam
- Motto in English: Good Health is Greatest Blessing and Pre-requisite for All Ventures in Life
- Type: Public
- Established: 2018; 8 years ago
- President: Dr. R. V. Ramani
- Director: Dr. Amita Jain
- Students: 500 (MBBS)
- Location: Raebareli, Uttar Pradesh, 229405, India; 26.1794°N 81.2433°E
- Campus: Urban
- Website: www.aiimsrbl.edu.in

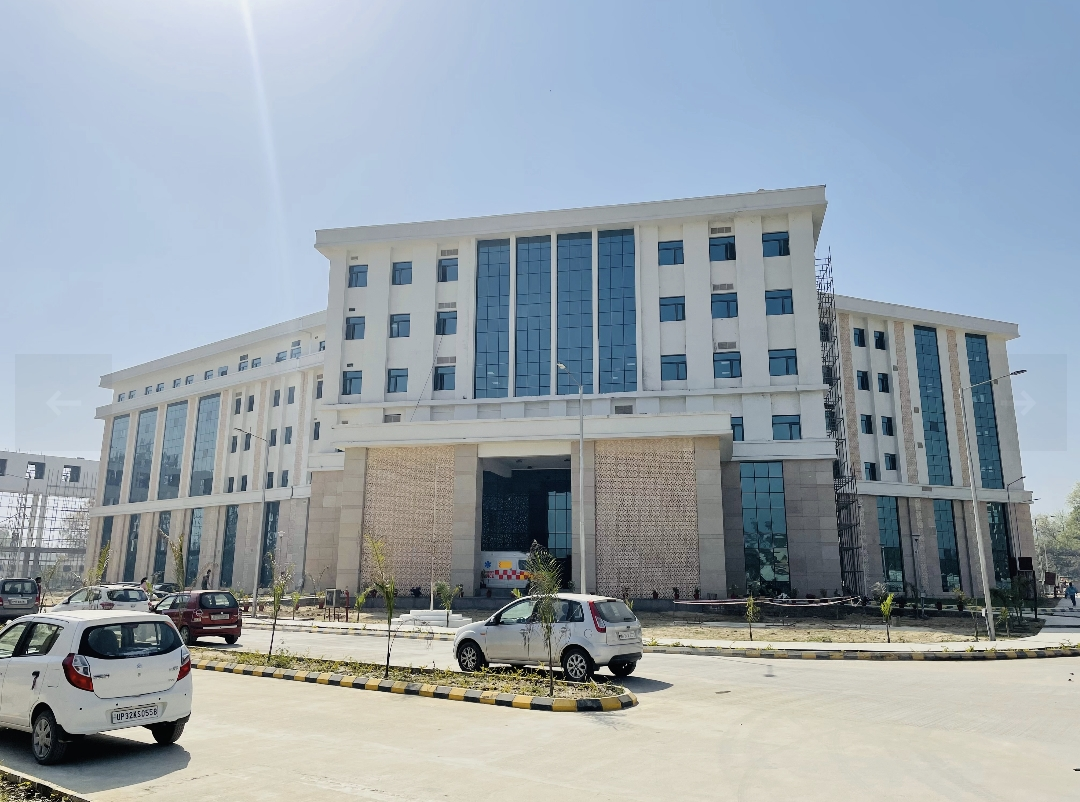
AIIMS Raebareli Medical College

All India Institute of Medical Sciences, Raebareli (AIIMS Raebareli) is a medical research public university and hospital based in Raebareli, Uttar Pradesh, India. One of the All India Institutes of Medical Sciences (AIIMS), It was established in 2018.

== History ==
An AIIMS in Raebareli was cleared in 2009 as "Phase-II" of the Pradhan Mantri Swasthya Suraksha Yojana (PMSSY) initiative. Following the approval of the All India Institute of Medical Sciences (Amendment) Act, 2012 the institute was officially established via a Gazette notification in 2013. In 2018 outpatient department (OPD) services became operational. The institute has March 2020 as target day of completion. It operates under the mentorship of the Postgraduate Institute of Medical Education and Research (PGIMER) with the director Prof. Jagat Ram.

== Academics ==
It started operation with the first batch of 50 MBBS students in 2019, one of the six AIIMSs to become operational in 2019. Arvind Rajwanshi was appointed executive director in March 2020. Dr. Amita Jain was appointed as Executive director in september 2025 and is currently in office.

== Campus ==
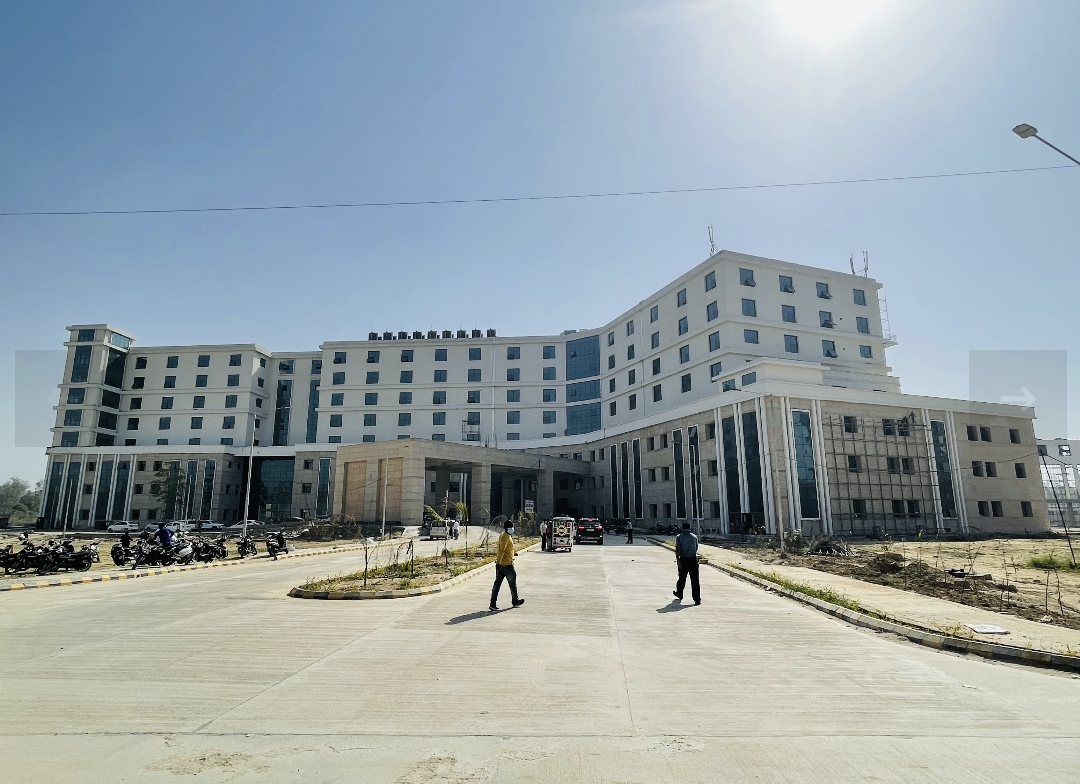
AIIMS Raebareli Hospital Block (Under Construction)

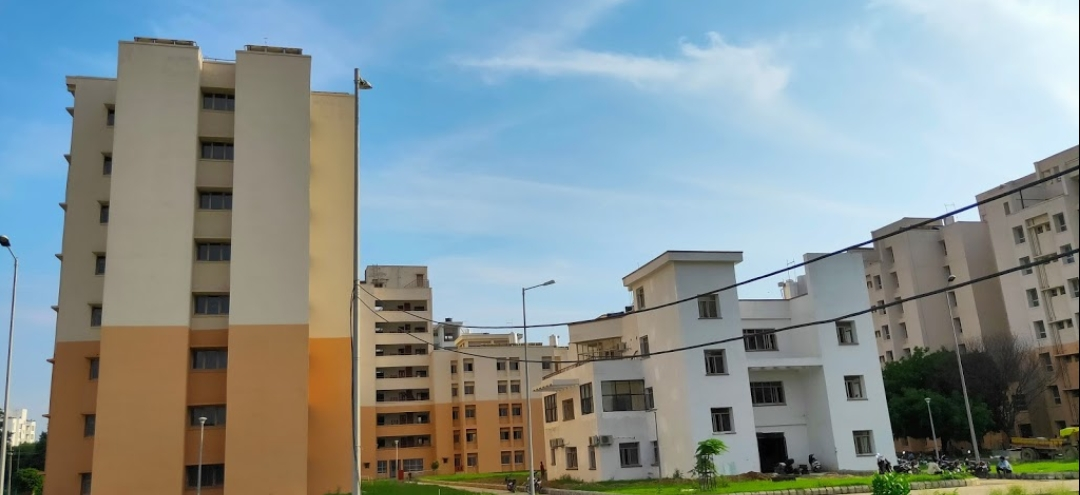
AIIMS Raebareli Residential Block

AIIMS Raebareli's main campus is located in Munshiganj, Dalmau Road, Raebareli. The main campus is spread into different locations containing the OPD block, main hospital block, medical college, administrative wing, hostels, faculty and staff quarters.

AIIMS Raebareli's Residential complex, staff quarters, hostels, mess building, hospital, medical college etc. construction was completed as of March 2021.

Currently, a 100 bedded critical care unit is under construction.

== See also ==
- AIIMS Gorakhpur
- National Institute of Pharmaceutical Education and Research, Raebareli
