= National Institute of Pharmaceutical Education and Research, Guwahati =

Indian public pharmacy research university

- Type: Public, Institute of National Importance
- Established: 2008 (18 years ago)
- Director: Dr. U. S. N. Murty (additional charge)
- Location: Sila Katamur, Changsari, Kamrup district, Assam - 781101., India; 26.24095°N 91.69565°E
- Nickname: NIPER-G
- Website: niperguwahati.ac.in

National Institute of Pharmaceutical Education and Research, Guwahati (NIPER-Guwahati) established 2008, is an Indian public Pharmacy research university, and a part of the seven schools, under India's Ministry of Chemicals and Fertilizers. It is located at Sila Katamur, Changsari in Kamrup district of Assam. The institute offers Masters and Doctoral degrees in pharmaceutical sciences. As an Institute of National Importance it plays an important role in the Human Resource Development for the ever-growing Indian Pharmaceutical industry, which has been in the forefront of India's science-based industries with wide-ranging capabilities in this important field of drug manufacture.

== History ==
NIPER-Guwahati started functioning from the month of September, 2008. The institute was inaugurated by the Hon'ble Union Minister for Fertilizers and Chemicals and Steel, Shri Ram Vilas Paswan on Sept 16th 2008. The foundation stone for the permanent campus at Changsari, Guwahati was laid on 30 May 2015 by Union Minister of Chemicals and Fertilizers Shri Ananth Kumar in the presence of Chief Minister of Assam Shri Tarun Gogoi and Minister of State (i/c) for Youth Affairs and Sports Shri Sarbananda Sonowal.

== Academics ==
=== Academic programmes ===
The institute offers a 2-year PG degree course; M.S (Pharm.), M.Pharm., and M.Tech. in 8 disciplines (Pharmacology & Toxicology, Pharmacy practice, Pharmaceutical analysis, Pharmaceutics, Biotechnology, Medicinal Chemistry, Pharmaceutical Technology (Formulations) and Medical Devices). It also offers 5 year Phd courses.

The institute has newly introduced course M.Tech. in Medical Devices by collaborating with IIT Guwahati.

=== Admission ===
Admissions into any programme in NIPER Guwahati are based on Graduate Pharmacy Aptitude Test (GPAT) followed by Joint Entrance Examination organized and conducted by NIPERs every year.

=== Ranking ===
University rankings

Pharmacy – India
- NIRF (2024): 12

National Institute of Pharmaceutical Education and Research, Guwahati was ranked 12th in India by the NIRF in the pharmacy ranking in 2024.

== Academic Departments ==
- Pharmacology and Toxicology
- Biotechnology
- Pharmacy Practice
- Medicinal Chemistry
- Pharmaceutics
- Pharmaceutical Analysis
- Medical Devices
- Pharmaceutical Technology (Formulations)
