= Expert Opinion on Biological Therapy =

- Discipline: Therapeutics
- Language: English
- Edited by: Michael Morse

Publication details
- History: 2001-present
- Publisher: Taylor & Francis
- Frequency: Monthly
- Impact factor: 3.974 (2017)

Standard abbreviations
- ISO 4: Expert Opin. Biol. Ther.

Indexing
- ISSN: 1471-2598 (print); 1744-7682 (web)
- LCCN: 2001243388
- OCLC no.: 48476209

Links
- Journal homepage; Online access; Online archive

Expert Opinion on Biological Therapy is a monthly peer-reviewed medical journal covering research on all aspects of biological therapy, including gene therapy and gene transfer technologies, therapeutic peptides and proteins, vaccines and antibodies, and cell- and tissue-based therapies. The journal is published by Taylor & Francis and the editor-in-chief is Michael Morse (Duke University Hospital). The journal was established in 2001 and according to the Journal Citation Reports, it has a 2017 impact factor of 3.974. The journal is also indexed in MEDLINE.
