= Institute under State Legislature Act =

Type of university in India

Institute under State Legislature Act is a type of university-level institution in India, established or incorporated by a state legislature act. Although such institutes do not come under the higher education department of the state and are run and funded by another department, they enjoy academic status and privileges like state universities. Other categories of university-level institutions in India including central university, state university, private university, deemed university.

== University Grants Commission (UGC) Act ==
Under the University Grants Commission (UGC) Act, 1956, "University" means a university established or incorporated by or under a Central Act, a Provincial Act or a State Act, and includes any such institution as may, in consultation with the university concerned, be recognized by the Commission in accordance with the regulations made in this behalf under this Act.

== List of Institutes under State Legislature Act ==
Location of the 4 Institutes under State Legislature Act (Green) in India.

There are 4 Institutes under State Legislature Act in India:

Institute	Location	State	Established	References
Sher-i-Kashmir Institute of Medical Sciences	Srinagar	Jammu and Kashmir	1983	
Sanjay Gandhi Postgraduate Institute of Medical Sciences	Lucknow	Uttar Pradesh	1987	
Indira Gandhi Institute of Medical Sciences	Patna	Bihar	1992	
Madras School of Economics	Chennai	Tamil Nadu	2021	
