= National Institute of Pharmaceutical Education and Research, Ahmedabad =

Indian research university in Gujarat, India

- Type: Public
- Established: 2007; 19 years ago
- Director: Shailendra Saraf (additional charge)
- Location: Ahmedabad, Gujarat, India; 30.6835°N 76.7318°E
- Campus: Urban
- Website: www.niperahm.ac.in

National Institute of Pharmaceutical Education and Research, Ahmedabad (NIPER Ahmedabad) is a public pharmacy research university in India and one of seven schools under India's Ministry of Chemicals and Fertilizers. The institute offers master's and doctoral degrees in pharmaceutical sciences. As an Institute of National Importance, it contributes to human resource development for the Indian pharmaceutical industry within India's science-based manufacturing sector.

== Academics ==
The institute offers a 2 year PG degree course; MS (Pharm.) in 7 disciplines ( Biotechnology, Medicinal Chemistry, Medical Devices, Pharmacology & Toxicology, Natural Products, Pharmaceutical Analysis & Pharmaceutics).

=== Ranking ===
University rankings

Pharmacy – India
- NIRF (2023): 13

National Institute of Pharmaceutical Education and Research, Ahmedabad was ranked 15th in India by the National Institutional Ranking Framework (NIRF) pharmacy ranking in 2024.
