= Delhi Pharmaceutical Sciences and Research University =

- Motto: उद्यम: कार्य साधक:
- Type: Public
- Established: 2015; 11 years ago
- Affiliations: UGC
- Chancellor: Lieutenant Governor of Delhi
- Vice-Chancellor: Dr. Ravichandiran V.
- Location: Delhi, India; 28.5170796°N 77.2248447°E
- Campus: Urban
- Website: dpsru.edu.in

Delhi Pharmaceutical Sciences and Research University (DPSRU) is a state university located at Delhi, India. The university is ranked 17th among pharmacy institutes in India by the National Institutional Ranking Framework (NIRF) in 2024.

== History ==
The Delhi Pharmaceutical Science and Research University has its root in the Delhi Institute of Pharmaceutical Sciences & Research (DIPSAR). DIPSAR was founded in 1964 as Department of Pharmacy and was located in Kashmiri gate, Delhi. In 1972, it was converted into the College of Pharmacy and moved to the campus of the Pusa Institute. Finally, in 1979 it moved to its present campus in Pushp Vihar. In 2004 it was named as Delhi Institute of Pharmaceutical Sciences & Research and affiliated to University of Delhi.

In 2008, the Government of Delhi passed the Delhi Pharmaceutical Science and Research University, 2008, The institute finally opened its gates in 2015, with DIPSAR as its constituent college, both operating from the same premises.

== University has currently following units ==
- Delhi Institute of Pharmaceutical Sciences (DIPSAR)
- School of Pharmaceutical Sciences
- School of Allied Health sciences with centre of Physiotherapy
- Academy of Sports Sciences Research and Management
- DPSRU Innovation & Incubation Foundation (DIIF)

== See also ==
- Jamia Hamdard
- Birla Institute of Technology, Mesra
- Uttar Pradesh University of Medical Sciences
- Panjab University
