= National Institute of Pharmaceutical Education and Research, S.A.S. Nagar =

Research university in Mohali, Punjab, India

Coordinates: 30.6830°N 76.7319°E

- Type: Public
- Dean: Arvind Kumar Bansal
- Director: Dulal Panda
- Location: Mohali, Punjab, India
- Website: www.niper.gov.in

National Institute of Pharmaceutical Education and Research, S.A.S. Nagar (NIPER S.A.S. Nagar), also known as NIPER Mohali, is the Topmost Pharmaceutical research institute in India & the main campus of the group of seven NIPER institutes, under India's Ministry of Chemicals and Fertilizers. The institute offers Masters and Doctoral degrees in pharmaceutical sciences. As an Institute of National Importance it plays an important role in the Human Resource Development for the ever-growing Indian Pharmaceutical industry, which has been at the forefront of India's science based industries with wide-ranging capabilities in this important field of drug manufacture. The institute offers a 2-year PG degree & 4-5 year PhD Courses in 13 disciplines;

(M Pharm. Clinical Research, Pharmacy Practice), (MS Pharm. Medicinal Chemistry, Pharmacology, Toxicology, Pharmaceutical Analysis, Natural products, Biotechnology, Pharmacoinformatics, Traditional medicine and Pharmaceutics),( M Tech. Pharmaceutical Technology & Process Chemistry (PTPC))and MBA (Pharm.).

The institute started M. Tech. in Medical Devices course in academic year 2020-21.

== Academics ==
NIPER S.A.S. Nagar, Research Blocks

NIPER offers Masters and Doctoral programs in various fields of the pharmaceutical sciences.

=== System of Studies ===
The course duration of Masters programs is four semesters, while the doctoral programs typically take six to ten semesters depending on the subject area of research. A scholar has to take a minimum number of credits offered from various departments depending on the program and branch of study. The Research, its presentation, and defense carry their own credits reflected in the final Cumulative Graded Point Average (CGPA).

==== Admissions ====
Every year in June and July NIPER conducts national level entrance examinations for admissions to its M.S.(Pharm)/MTech/M.Pharm., MBA (Pharm.) and PhD programs. Candidates interested in MBA (Pharmaceutical Management) and the doctoral programs are further screened by personal interview. The candidates are required to have qualified the Graduate Aptitude Test in Engineering (GATE) or now Graduate Pharmacy Aptitude Test (GPAT) in a suitable subject area, although exceptions are allowed for some applicants/programs. Now GATE in Pharmacy discipline has been replaced by GPAT and pharmacy graduate has to qualify the GPAT. Exam for doctoral program is subject and/or department specific. For doctoral studies, normally the PI has sufficient funding to support the student, but in its absence a fellowship via the National Eligibility Test conducted by the University Grants Commission or such student support schemes makes the applicant's case strong. Most masters courses include one-year project work which is in the second year. In this second year of laboratory work, students get exposure to quality research work and thus get the skills to continue in research field in future by enrolling into various PHD programs at national level institutes like CSIR and in prestigious foreign universities.

== Organization ==
NIPER functions under the Union Ministry of Chemicals and Fertilizers. The president of the Republic of India is the visitor of the institute. Its policy architecture is framed and reviewed by a board of governors which includes eminent academics, members of the parliament and entrepreneurs. The institute is represented by a director, who is also the chief academic and executive officer.

== Ranking ==
College and university rankings

National Institute of Pharmaceutical Education and Research, Mohali Always ranks in 1-3rd Position in India by the National Institutional Ranking Framework (NIRF) pharmacy ranking.

== Campus ==
NIPER Mohali campus spans over an area of 130 acres (0.53 km^{2}), near the Punjab Cricket Association Stadium of S.A.S. Nagar (Mohali). It is a fully residential institute offering unmarried as well as married hostel accommodation. In addition, it offers accommodation to the faculty, staff and visitors. Its campus is full of flora and fauna thus looks green always.

== See also ==
- Institutes of National Importance
