= Boeing 787 Dreamliner =

Twin-aisle airliner family

- A Boeing 787-9 of Japan Airlines

General information
- Other name: Dreamliner
- Type: Wide-body jet airliner
- National origin: United States
- Manufacturer: Boeing Commercial Airplanes
- Status: In service
- Primary users: All Nippon Airways United Airlines; American Airlines; Japan Airlines
- Number built: 1,322 as of October 2026

History
- Manufactured: 2007–present
- Introduction date: October 26, 2011, with All Nippon Airways
- First flight: December 15, 2009; 16 years ago
- In service: October 26, 2011 – present

The Boeing 787 Dreamliner, often shortened to 787, is an American wide-body airliner developed and manufactured by Boeing Commercial Airplanes. After dropping its unconventional Sonic Cruiser project, Boeing announced the conventional 7E7 on January 29, 2003, which focused largely on efficiency. The program was launched on April 26, 2004, with an order for 50 aircraft from All Nippon Airways (ANA), targeting a 2008 introduction. On July 8, 2007, a prototype 787 without major operating systems was rolled out; subsequently the aircraft experienced multiple delays, until its maiden flight on December 15, 2009. Type certification was received in August 2011, and the first 787-8 was delivered in September 2011 and entered commercial service in October 2011, with ANA.

At launch, Boeing targeted the 787 with 20% less fuel burn compared to aircraft like the Boeing 767. It could carry 200 to 300 passengers on point-to-point routes up to 8,500 nautical miles [nmi] (15,700 km; 9,800 mi), a shift from hub-and-spoke travel. The twinjet is powered by General Electric GEnx or Rolls-Royce Trent 1000 high-bypass turbofans. It is the first airliner with an airframe primarily made of composite materials and makes greater use of electrical systems. Externally, it is recognizable by its four-window cockpit, raked wingtips, and noise-reducing chevrons on its engine nacelles. Development and production rely on subcontractors around the world more than for previous Boeing aircraft. Since March 2021, final assembly has been at the Boeing South Carolina factory; it was formerly in the Boeing Everett Factory in Washington state.

The initial 186-foot-long (57 m) 787-8 typically seats 248 passengers over a range of 7,305 nmi (13,529 km; 8,406 mi), with a 502,500 lb (227.9 t) MTOW compared to 560,000 lb (250 t) for later variants. The stretched 787-9, 206 ft (63 m) long, can fly 7,565 nmi (14,010 km; 8,706 mi) with 296 passengers; it entered service on August 7, 2014, with All Nippon Airways. The further stretched 787-10, 224 ft (68 m) long, seating 336 over 6,330 nmi (11,720 km; 7,280 mi), entered service with Singapore Airlines on April 3, 2018.

Early 787 operations encountered several problems caused mainly by its lithium-ion batteries, including fires onboard some aircraft. In January 2013, the US FAA grounded all 787s until it approved the revised battery design in April 2013. Significant quality control issues from 2019 onward caused a production slowdown and, from January 2021 until August 2022, an almost total cessation of deliveries. The first fatal crash and hull loss of the aircraft occurred on June 12, 2025, with Air India Flight 171. A preliminary report issued on July 12 by the Indian Aircraft Accident Investigation Bureau did not recommend any actions to Boeing, or 787 operators. Boeing has spent $32 billion on the program; estimates for the number of aircraft sales needed to break even vary between 1,300 and 2,000. As of October 2026, the 787 program has received 2,504 orders and made 1,322 deliveries.

== Development ==
=== Background ===
During the late 1990s, slowing sales of the 767 and 747-400 prompted Boeing to consider replacing them. Two proposals were made: the 747X would have lengthened the 747-400 and improved its efficiency, and the Sonic Cruiser would have achieved 15% higher speeds (approximately Mach 0.98) while burning fuel at the same rate as the 767. Market interest for the 747X proposal was tepid; several major American airlines, including Continental Airlines, showed initial enthusiasm for the Sonic Cruiser, although concerns about its operating cost were expressed. The global airline market was disrupted by the 9/11 attacks and increased petroleum prices, making airlines more interested in efficiency than speed. The worst-affected airlines, those in the United States, had been considered the most likely customers for the Sonic Cruiser; thus the Sonic Cruiser was officially canceled on December 20, 2002. On January 29, 2003, Boeing announced another product, the 7E7, that would use Sonic Cruiser technology in a more conventional configuration. The emphasis on a smaller midsize twinjet rather than a large 747-size aircraft represented a shift from the hub-and-spoke theory toward the point-to-point theory, in response to analysis of focus groups.

Randy Baseler, a vice-president of marketing for Boeing Commercial Airplanes, said that airport congestion comes from large numbers of regional jets and small single-aisle planes, flying to destinations where a 550-seat Airbus A380 would be too large, and that the number of such departures could be reduced by making the smaller airplanes 20% larger and using point-to-point transit to avoid airline hubs.

In 2003, James McNerney, who was then a relatively new member of Boeing's board of directors, supported the idea for a new aircraft to regain market share from Airbus. (In 2005 he took over as CEO.) The 2003 board, which included Harry Stonecipher as CEO as well as John McDonnell, issued an ultimatum to "develop the plane for less than 40 percent of what the 777 had cost to develop 13 years earlier, and build each plane out of the gate for less than 60 percent of the 777's unit costs in 2003", and approved a development budget estimated at US$7 billion as Boeing management claimed that they would "require subcontractors to foot the majority of costs". Boeing Commercial Airplanes president Alan Mulally, who had previously served as general manager of the 777 programs, contrasted the board's approval process for the 787 with that used for the 777, saying "In the old days, you would go to the board and ask for X amount of money, and they'd counter with Y amount of money, and then you'd settle on a number, and that's what you'd use to develop the plane. These days, you go to the board, and they say, 'Here's the budget for this airplane, and we'll be taking this piece of it off the top, and you get what's left; don't fuck up.'"

The project to replace the Sonic Cruiser was named "7E7" (with a development code name of "Y2"). Technology from the Sonic Cruiser and 7E7 was to be used as part of Boeing's project to replace its entire airliner product line, an endeavor called the Yellowstone Project (of which the 7E7 became the first stage). Early concept images of the 7E7 included rakish cockpit windows, a dropped nose, and a distinctive "shark-fin" tail. The "E" was said to stand for various things, such as "efficiency" or "environmentally friendly". In the end, Boeing said it stood for "Eight". In July 2003, a public naming competition was held for the 7E7, for which out of 500,000 votes cast online the winning title was Dreamliner. Other names included eLiner, Global Cruiser, and Stratoclimber.

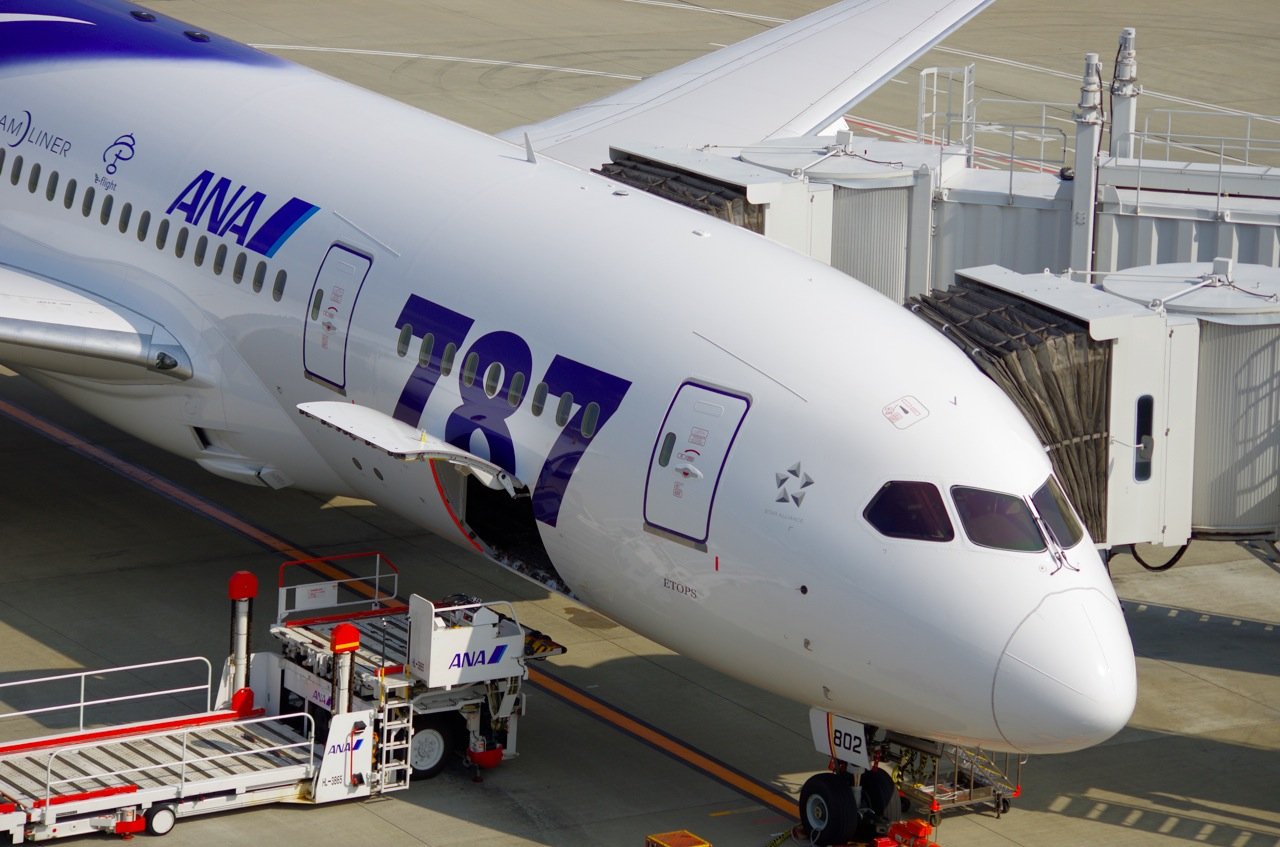
All Nippon Airways launched the 787 program with an order for 50 aircraft in 2004.

On April 26, 2004, Japanese airline All Nippon Airways (ANA) became the launch customer for the 787, announcing a firm order for 50 aircraft with deliveries to begin in late 2008. The ANA order was initially specified as 30 787-3, 290–330 seat, one-class domestic aircraft, and 20 787-8, long-haul, 210–250 seat, two-class aircraft for regional international routes such as Tokyo-Narita to Beijing-Capital, and could perform routes to cities not previously served, such as Denver, Moscow, and New Delhi. The 787-3 and 787-8 were to be the initial variants, with the 787-9 entering service in 2010.

On October 5, 2012, Indian state carrier Air India became the first carrier to take possession of a Dreamliner that was manufactured in the Charleston, South Carolina, Boeing plant. This was the first 787 that was manufactured outside of Washington. Boeing would go on to use both the Everett and South Carolina plants to deliver the Dreamliner.

The 787 was the first production airliner built with a fuselage comprising one-piece composite barrel sections instead of aluminum-sheet assemblies using many fasteners. Boeing selected two new engines to power the 787, the Rolls-Royce Trent 1000 and General Electric GEnx. Boeing stated the 787 would be approximately 20 percent more fuel-efficient than the 767, with approximately 40 percent of the efficiency gain from the engines, plus gains from aerodynamic improvements, increased use of lighter-weight composite materials, and advanced systems. The airframe underwent extensive structural testing during its design. The 787-8 and -9 were intended to have a certified 330-minute ETOPS capability, but entered service with 180 minutes. 330-minute certification was delayed until 2014.

During the design phase, the 787 underwent extensive wind tunnel testing at Boeing's Transonic Wind Tunnel, QinetiQ's five-meter wind tunnel at Farnborough, United Kingdom, and NASA Ames Research Center's wind tunnel, as well as at the French aerodynamics research agency, ONERA. The final styling was more conservative than earlier proposals, with the fin, nose, and cockpit windows changed to a more conventional form. By 2005, customer-announced orders and commitments for the 787 reached 237 aircraft. Boeing initially priced the 787-8 variant at US$120 million, a low figure that surprised the industry. By 2007, the list price had increased to US$157–167 million, eventually exceeding US$200 million by the time the aircraft received type certification. Airlines and lessors do not pay the full list price, with market prices for the 787-8 being up to 46% lower.

=== Manufacturing and suppliers ===
Graphical representation of which components of the aircraft were built by which companies

On December 16, 2003, Boeing announced that the 787 would be assembled in its factory in Everett, Washington. Instead of conventionally building the aircraft from the ground up, the final assembly employed 800 to 1,200 people to join completed subassemblies and integrate systems. Boeing assigned global subcontractors to do more assembly work, delivering completed subassemblies to Boeing for final assembly. This approach was intended to result in a leaner, simpler assembly line and lower inventory, with pre-installed systems reducing final assembly time by three-quarters to three days. Subcontractors had early difficulties procuring needed parts and finishing subassemblies on schedule, leaving remaining assembly work for Boeing to complete as "traveled work". In 2010, Boeing considered in-house construction of the 787-9 tail; the tail of the 787-8 is made by Alenia. The 787 was unprofitable for some subcontractors; Alenia's parent company, Finmeccanica, had a total loss of €750 million on the project.

Subcontracted assemblies included wing and center wing box (Mitsubishi Heavy Industries, Japan; Subaru Corporation, Japan); horizontal stabilizers (Alenia Aeronautica, Italy; Korea Aerospace Industries, South Korea); fuselage sections (Global Aeronautica, Italy; Boeing, North Charleston, US; Kawasaki Heavy Industries, Japan; Spirit AeroSystems, Wichita, US; Korean Air, South Korea); passenger doors (Latécoère, France); cargo doors, access doors, and crew escape door (Saab AB, Sweden); software development (HCL Enterprise, India); floor beams (TAL Manufacturing Solutions Limited, India); wiring (Labinal, France); wing-tips, flap support fairings, wheel well bulkhead, and longerons (Korean Air, South Korea); landing gear (Messier-Bugatti-Dowty, UK/France); and power distribution and management systems, air conditioning packs (Hamilton Sundstrand, Connecticut, US). Custom tooling to manufacture the one-piece carbon fiber fuselage components were manufactured by Spirit Aerosystems, Wichita, US; Alenia Aeronautica (later Leonardo), Italy; Janicki Industries, Sedro-Woolley, US; and Coast Composites, Irvine, US.

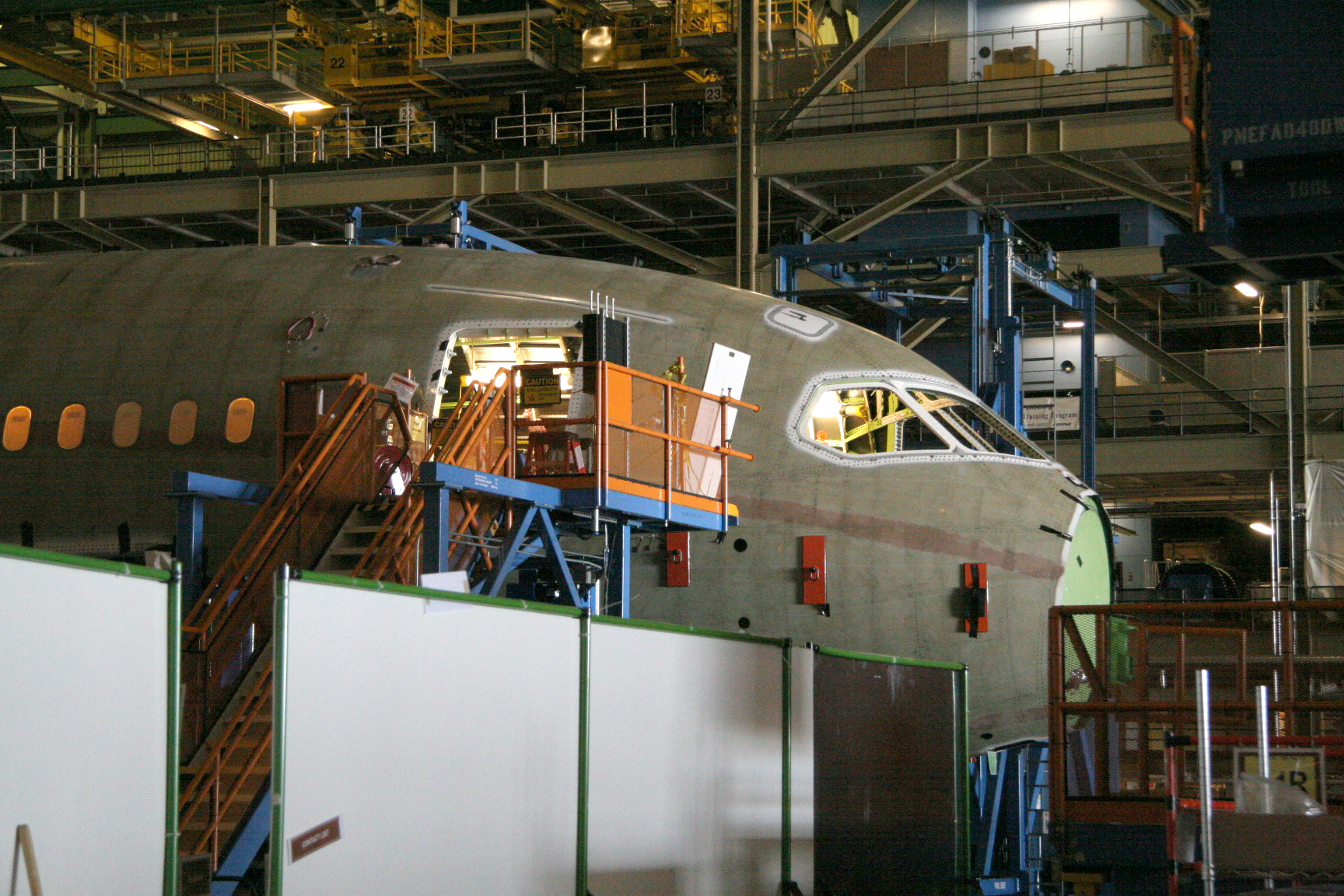
Assembly of "Section 41", the nose section of the Boeing 787

To speed up deliveries, Boeing modified four used 747-400s into 747 Dreamlifters to transport 787 wings, fuselage sections, and other smaller parts. Japanese industrial participation was key to the project. Japanese companies co-designed and built 35% of the aircraft; the first time that outside firms played a key design role on Boeing airliner wings. The Japanese government supported development with an estimated US$2 billion in loans. On April 26, 2006, Japanese manufacturer Toray Industries and Boeing signed a production agreement involving US$6 billion worth of carbon fiber, extending a 2004 contract. In May 2007, the final assembly on the first 787 began at Everett.

From the outset, 787 chief engineer Walt Gillette and his colleagues realized that the "Working Together" approach to supplier coordination used for the 777 must substantially evolve for the 787. So they created the 787 Dreamliner Partner Council. The council evolved from the Sonic Cruiser effort and a similar approach used in Boeing's defense business unit. The partner council would make 787 decisions together, a departure from Boeing's more hierarchical approach to decision making for the 777. Boeing harnessed not only expertise from the Partner Council, but also benefited from cross-cultural collaboration, according to Walt Gillette, as quoted in The Culture of Collaboration (2024, expanded and updated edition) by Evan Rosen.

Boeing worked to reduce excess weight since assembly of the first airframe began; in late 2006, the first six 787s were overweight, with the first aircraft 5,000 lb (2,300 kg) heavier than required. The seventh and subsequent aircraft would be the first 787-8s expected to meet the weight requirement. Accordingly, some parts were redesigned to include more use of titanium. In July 2015, Reuters reported that Boeing was considering reducing the use of titanium to reduce the construction cost.

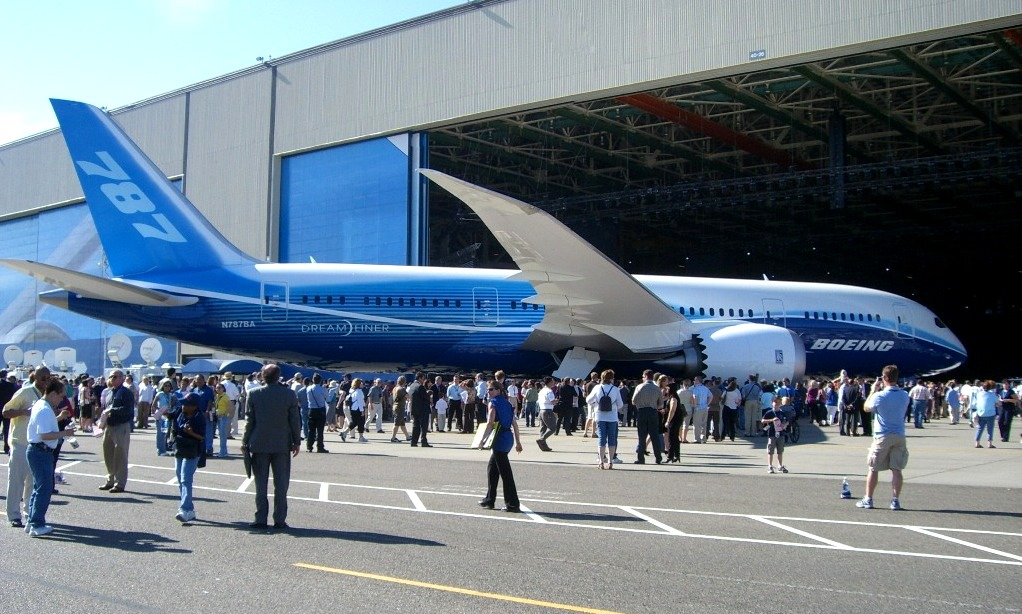
The first public appearance of the 787 on July 8, 2007

Early built 787s (line numbers under 20) were overweight, increasing their fuel burn and reducing their maximum range, and some carriers decided to take later aircraft. Boeing struggled to sell these aircraft, eventually offering significant discounts and scrapping one. Because of their line numbers, these aircraft were nicknamed the "Terrible Teens".

Boeing planned the first flight by the end of August 2007 and premiered the first 787 (registered N787BA) at a rollout ceremony on July 8, 2007. The 787 had 677 orders at this time, which is more orders from launch to roll-out than any previous wide-body airliner. The major systems were not installed at the time; many parts were attached with temporary non-aerospace fasteners requiring replacement with flight fasteners later.

In September 2007, Boeing announced a three-month delay, blaming a shortage of fasteners as well as incomplete software. On October 10, 2007, a second three-month delay to the first flight and a six-month delay to first deliveries were announced due to supply chain problems, a lack of documentation from overseas suppliers, and flight guidance software delays. Less than a week later, Mike Bair, the 787 program manager, was replaced. On January 16, 2008, Boeing announced a third three-month delay to the first flight of the 787, citing insufficient progress on "traveled work". On March 28, 2008, to gain more control over the supply chain, Boeing announced plans to buy Vought Aircraft Industries' interest in Global Aeronautica; a later agreement was also made to buy Vought's factory in North Charleston.

On April 9, 2008, a fourth delay was announced, shifting the maiden flight to the fourth quarter of 2008, and delaying initial deliveries by around 15 months to the third quarter of 2009. The 787-9 variant was postponed to 2012 and the 787-3 variant was to follow at a later date. On November 4, 2008, a fifth delay was announced due to incorrect fastener installation and the Boeing machinists strike, stating that the first test flight would not occur in the fourth quarter of 2008. After assessing the program schedule with suppliers, in December 2008, Boeing stated that the first flight was delayed until the second quarter of 2009. Airlines, such as United Airlines and Air India, stated their intentions to seek compensation from Boeing for the delays.

A secondary factor in the delays faced by the 787 program was the lack of detailed specifications provided to partners and suppliers. In previous programs Boeing had supplied high level design data, but for the 787, decided to provide broad level specifications only, on the assumption that relevant partners had the competencies to perform the design and integration work with the limited data. This decision created several delays as suppliers struggled to work with the limited design data.

=== Pre-flight ground testing ===
As Boeing worked with its suppliers toward production, the design proceeded through a series of test goals. On August 23, 2007, a crash test involving a vertical drop of a partial composite fuselage section from about 15 ft (5 m) onto a 1 in (25 mm)-thick steel plate occurred in Mesa, Arizona; the results matched predictions, allowing modeling of various crash scenarios using computational analysis instead of further physical tests. While critics had expressed concerns that a composite fuselage could shatter and burn with toxic fumes during crash landings, test data indicated no greater toxicity than conventional metal airframes. The crash test was the third in a series of demonstrations conducted to match FAA requirements, including additional certification criteria due to the wide-scale use of composite materials. The 787 meets the FAA's requirement that passengers have at least as good a chance of surviving a crash landing as they would with current metal airliners.

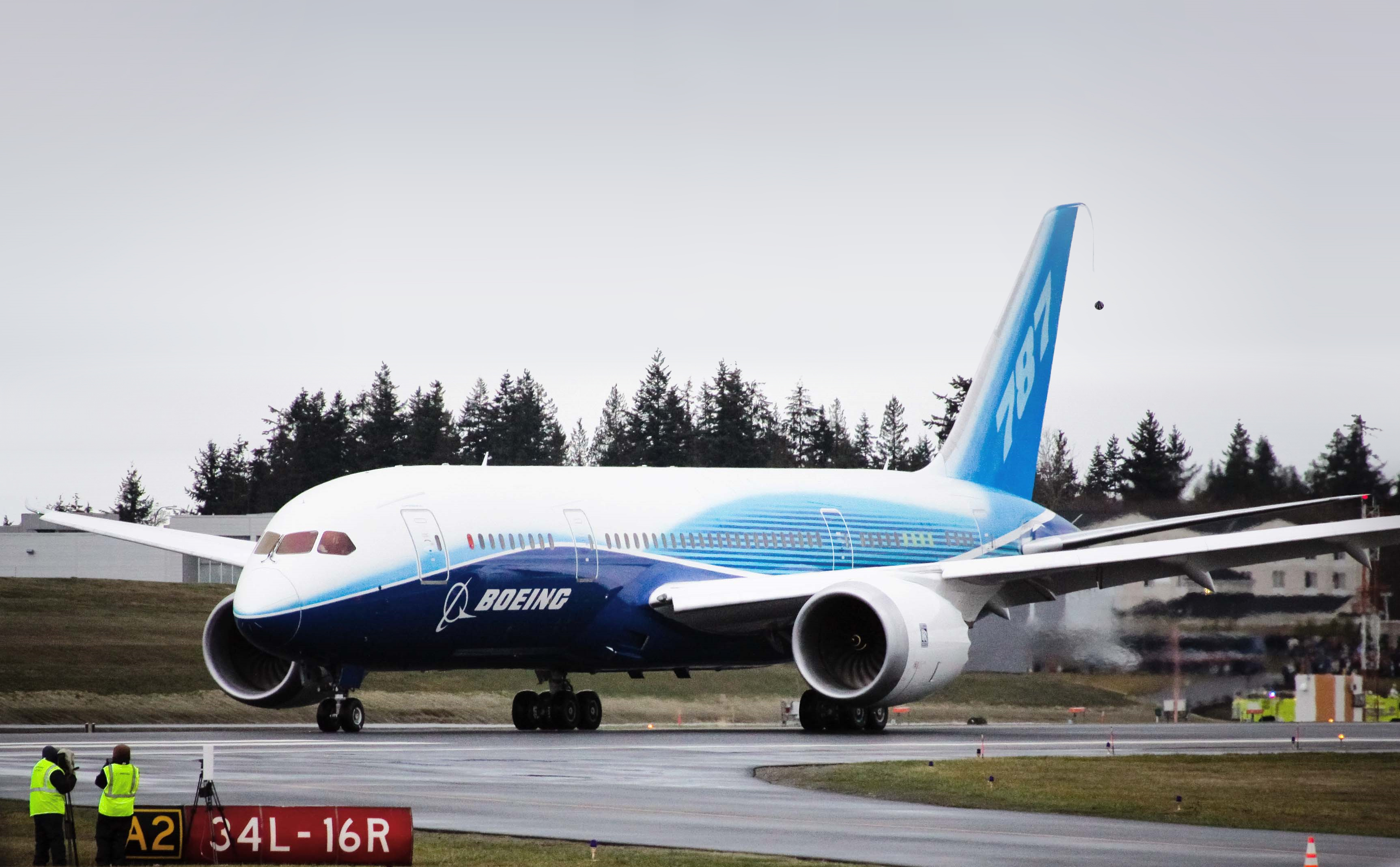
The prototype Boeing 787 underwent taxi tests at Paine Field in November and December 2009.

On August 7, 2007, on-time certification of the Rolls-Royce Trent 1000 engine by European and US regulators was received. The alternative GE GEnx-1B engine achieved certification on March 31, 2008. On June 20, 2008, the first aircraft was powered up, for testing the electrical supply and distribution systems. A non-flightworthy static test airframe was built; on September 27, 2008, the fuselage was successfully tested to a differential pressure of 14.9 psi (103 kPa), which is 150 percent of the maximum pressure expected in commercial service. In December 2008, the 787's maintenance program was passed by the FAA.

On May 3, 2009, the first test 787 was moved to the flight line following extensive factory testing, including landing gear swings, systems integration verification, and a total run-through of the first flight. On May 4, 2009, a press report indicated a 10–15% range reduction, about 6,900 nmi (12,800 km; 7,900 mi) instead of the originally promised 7,700 to 8,200 nautical miles (14,300 to 15,200 km; 8,900 to 9,400 mi), for early aircraft that were about 8% overweight. Substantial redesign work was expected to correct this, which would complicate increases in production rates; Boeing stated the early 787-8s would have a range of almost 8,000 nmi (15,000 km; 9,200 mi). As a result, some airlines reportedly delayed deliveries of 787s to take later planes that may be closer to the original estimates. Boeing expected to have the weight issues addressed by the 21st production model.

On June 15, 2009, during the Paris Air Show, Boeing said that the 787 would make its first flight within two weeks. On June 23, the first flight was postponed due to structural reasons. Boeing provided an updated 787 schedule on August 27, 2009, with the first flight planned to occur by the end of 2009 and deliveries to begin at the end of 2010. The company expected to write off US$2.5 billion because it considered the first three Dreamliners built unsellable and suitable only for flight tests. On October 28, 2009, Boeing selected Charleston, SC as the site for a second 787 production line, after soliciting bids from multiple states. On December 12, 2009, the first 787 completed high-speed taxi tests, the last major step before flight.

=== Flight testing ===
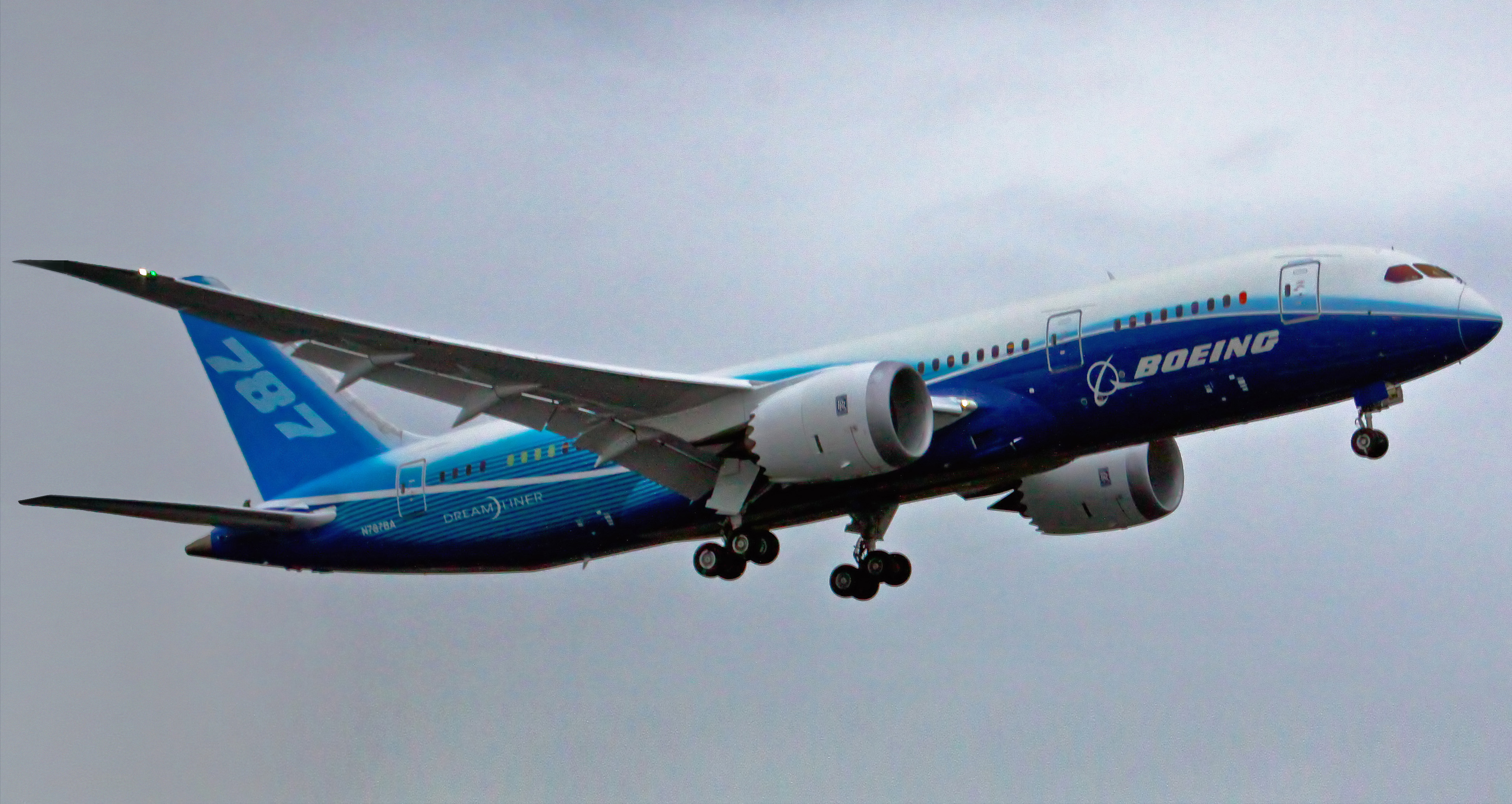
The first 787 taking off on its maiden flight in December 2009

On December 15, 2009, Boeing conducted the 787-8 maiden flight from Paine Field in Everett, Washington, at 10:27 am PST and landed three hours later at 1:33 p.m. at Seattle's Boeing Field. During the flight the 787 reached a top speed of 180 kn (207 mph; 333 km/h) and maximum altitude of 13,200 ft (4,000 m). Originally scheduled for 5 1/2 hours, the test flight was shortened to three hours due to unfavorable weather conditions. The six-aircraft ground and flight test program was scheduled to be done in eight and a half months and 6800 hours, which was the fastest certification campaign for a new Boeing commercial design.

The flight test program comprised six aircraft, ZA001 through ZA006, four with Rolls-Royce Trent 1000 engines and two with GE GEnx-1B64 engines. The second 787, ZA002 in All Nippon Airways livery, flew to Boeing Field on December 22, 2009, to join the flight test program; the third 787, ZA004 made its first flight on February 24, 2010, followed by ZA003 on March 14, 2010. On March 24, 2010, flutter and ground effects testing was completed, clearing the aircraft to fly its entire flight envelope. On March 28, 2010, the 787 completed the ultimate wing load test, which requires that the wings of a fully assembled aircraft be loaded to 150% of the design limit load and held for 3 seconds. The wings were flexed approximately 25 ft (7.6 m) upward during the test. Unlike past aircraft, the wings were not tested to failure. On April 7, data showed the test had been a success.

On April 23, 2010, the newest 787, ZA003, arrived at the McKinley Climatic Laboratory hangar at Eglin Air Force Base, Florida, for extreme weather testing in temperatures ranging from 115 to −45 °F (46 to −43 °C), including takeoff preparations at both temperature extremes. ZA005, the fifth 787 and the first with GEnx engines, began ground engine tests in May 2010, and made its first flight on June 16, 2010. In June 2010, gaps were discovered in the horizontal stabilizers of test aircraft due to improperly installed shims; all aircraft were inspected and repaired. That same month, a 787 experienced its first in-flight lightning strike; inspections found no damage. As composites can have as little as 1/1,000th the electrical conductivity of aluminum, conductive material is added to alleviate potential risks and to meet FAA requirements. The FAA also planned requirement changes to help the 787 show compliance. In December 2019, it was reported that Boeing had removed the copper foil that formed part of the protection against lightning strikes to the wings of the aircraft; it then worked with the FAA to override concerns raised.

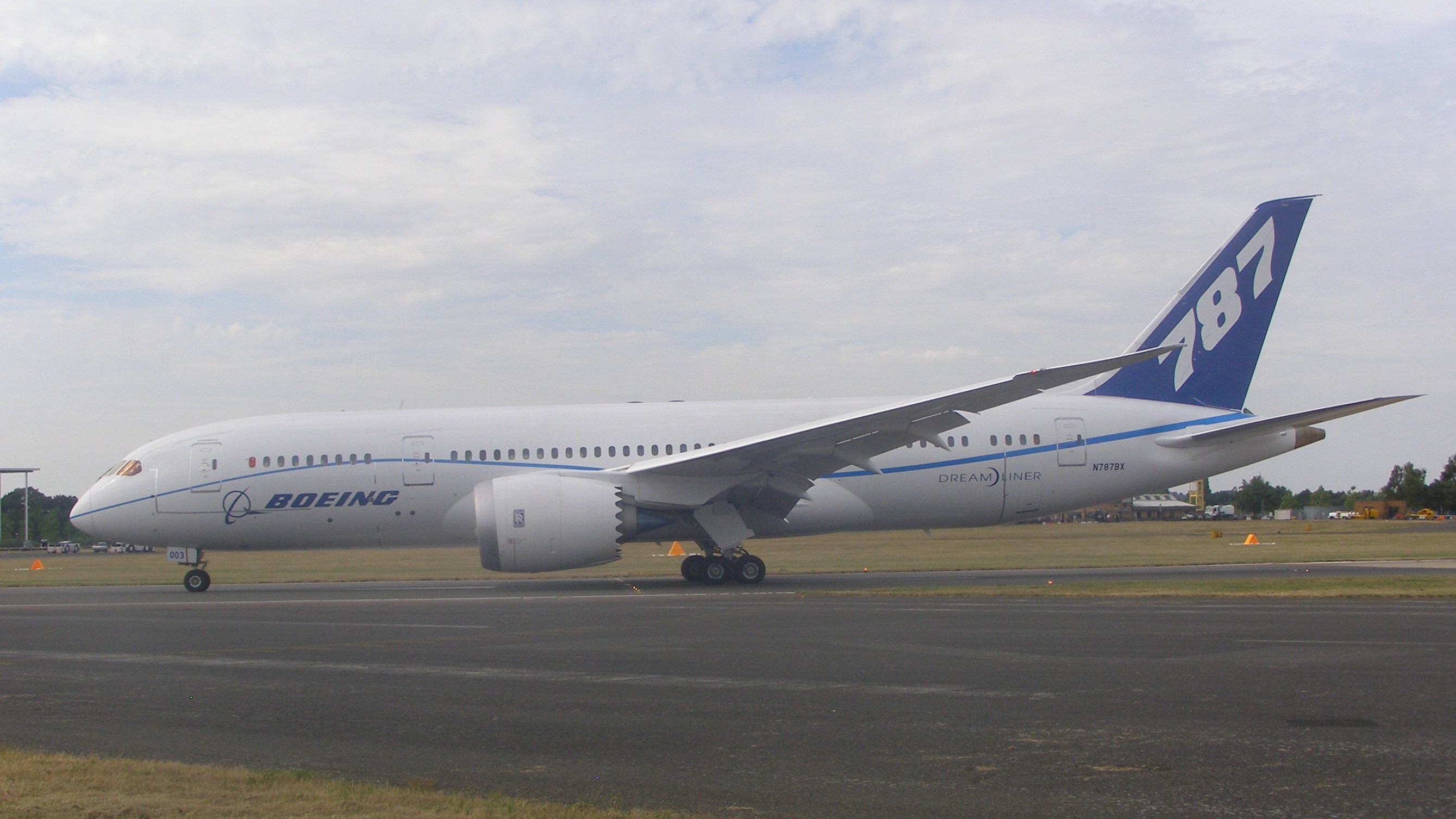
A 787 at the 2010 Farnborough Airshow

The 787 made its first appearance at an international air show at the Farnborough Airshow, United Kingdom, on July 18, 2010.

On August 2, 2010, a Trent 1000 engine suffered an uncontained failure at Rolls-Royce's test facility during ground testing. The failure changed the schedule for installing Trent 1000 engines; on August 27, 2010, Boeing stated that the first delivery to launch customer ANA would be delayed until early 2011. That same month, Boeing faced compensation claims from airlines owing to ongoing delivery delays. In September 2010, it was reported that two additional 787s might join the test fleet for a total of eight flight test aircraft. On September 10, 2010, a partial engine surge occurred in a Trent engine on ZA001 at Roswell. On October 4, 2010, the sixth 787, ZA006 joined the test program with its first flight.

On November 9, 2010, the second 787, ZA002 made an emergency landing at Laredo International Airport, Texas, after smoke and flames were detected in the main cabin during a test flight. The electrical fire caused some systems to fail before landing. Following this incident, Boeing suspended flight testing on November 10, 2010; ground testing continued. After investigation, the in-flight fire was primarily attributed to foreign object debris (FOD) that was present in the electrical bay. After electrical system and software changes, the 787 resumed flight testing on December 23, 2010.

=== Test evaluation and certification ===
On November 5, 2010, it was reported that some 787 deliveries would be delayed to address problems found during flight testing. In January 2011, the first 787 delivery was rescheduled to the third quarter of 2011 due to software and electrical updates following the in-flight fire. By February 24, 2011, the 787 had completed 80% of the test conditions for the Rolls-Royce Trent 1000 engine and 60% of the conditions for the General Electric GEnx-1B engine. In July 2011, ANA performed a week of operations testing using a 787 in Japan. The test aircraft had flown 4,828 hours in 1,707 flights combined by August 15, 2011. During testing, the 787 visited 14 countries in Asia, Europe, North America, and South America to test in extreme climates and conditions and for route testing.

On August 13, 2011, certification testing of the Rolls-Royce powered 787-8 finished. The FAA and European Aviation Safety Agency certified the 787 on August 26, 2011, at a ceremony in Everett, Washington.

=== Entry into service ===
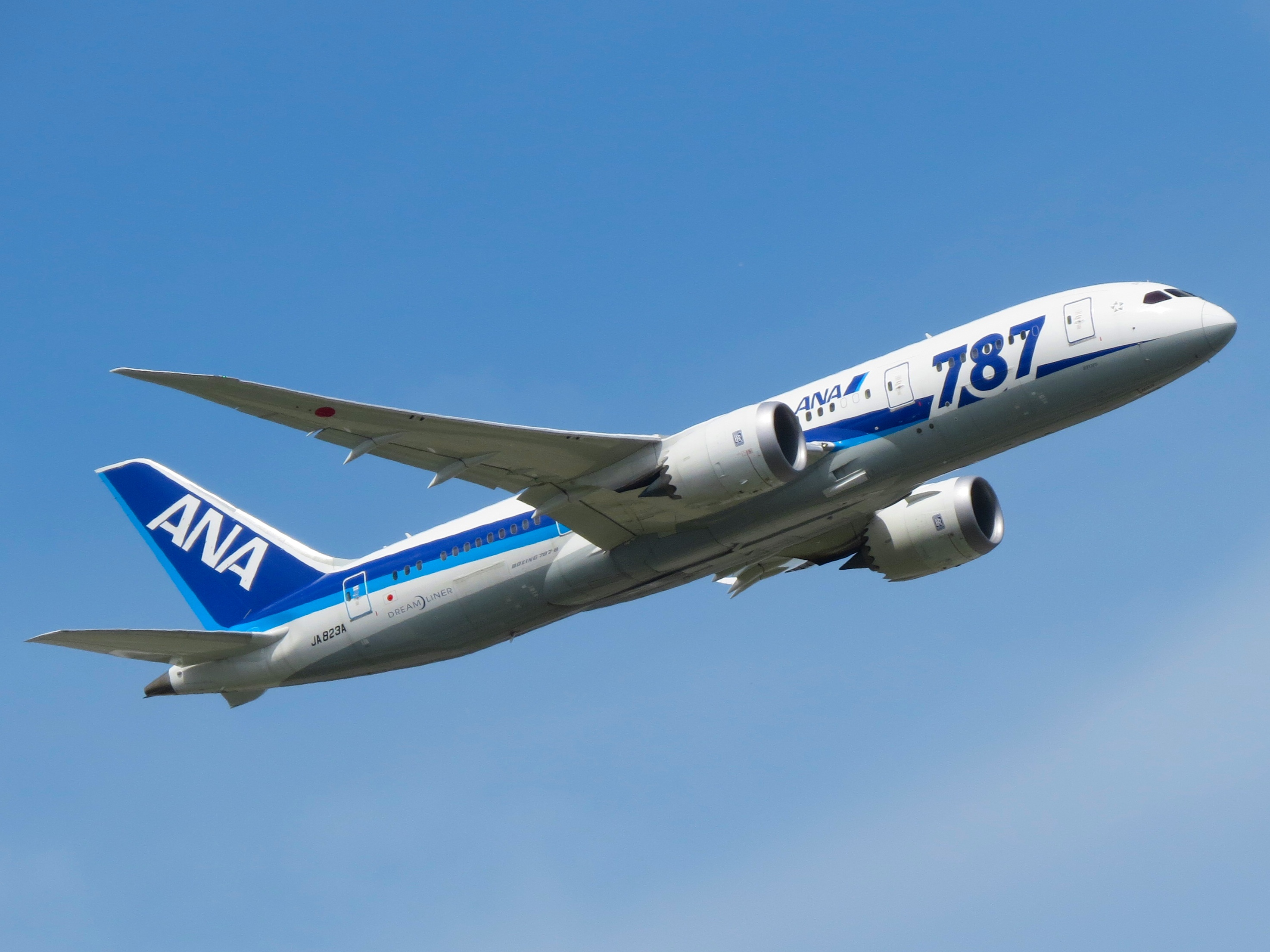
All Nippon Airways flew the first commercial 787 flight on October 26, 2011.

Certification cleared the way for deliveries and in 2011, Boeing prepared to increase 787 production rates from two to ten aircraft per month at assembly lines in Everett and Charleston over two years. Legal difficulties clouded production at Charleston; on April 20, 2011, the National Labor Relations Board alleged that a second production line in South Carolina violated two sections of the National Labor Relations Act. In December 2011, the National Labor Relations Board dropped its lawsuit after the Machinists' union withdrew its complaint as part of a new contract with Boeing. The first 787 assembled in South Carolina was rolled out on April 27, 2012.

The first 787 was officially delivered to All Nippon Airways (ANA) on September 25, 2011, at the Boeing Everett factory. A ceremony to mark the occasion was also held the next day. On September 27, it flew to Tokyo Haneda Airport. The airline took delivery of the second 787 on October 13, 2011.

On October 26, 2011, an ANA 787 flew the first commercial flight from Tokyo's Narita International Airport to Hong Kong International Airport. The Dreamliner entered service some three years later than originally planned. Tickets for the flight were sold in an online auction; the highest bidder had paid $34,000 for a seat. An ANA 787 flew its first long-haul flight to Europe on January 21, 2012, from Haneda to Frankfurt Airport.

=== Proposed variants ===
==== Freighter version ====
Even after production of the 787 began, Boeing continued to produce the 767 as a freighter. More stringent emissions and noise limits will go into effect in 2028 and prevent 767 sales in its current form. To address this concern, Boeing has widely reported to be working on a freighter version of the 787, showing proposals to customers including FedEx Express. As of May 2024, production of the 787 Freighter is expected to begin between 2028 and 2033.

==== 787-3 ====
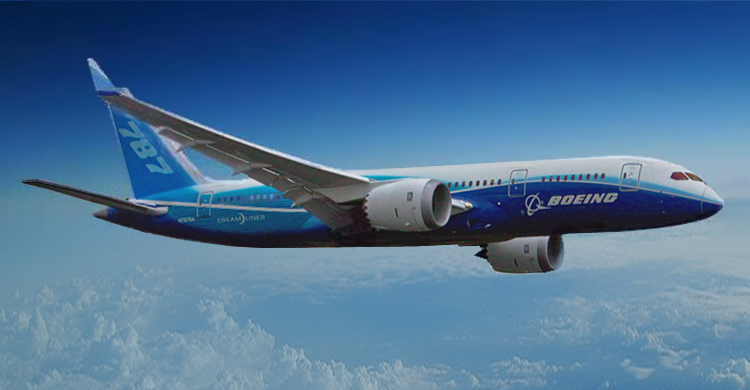
The 787-3 would feature a reduced wingspan with wingtip devices.

The 787-3 would have carried 290–330 passengers in two-class over 2,500–3,050 nmi (4,630–5,650 km; 2,880–3,510 mi) range, limited by a 364,000 lb (165 t) MTOW. In April 2008, to keep the -8 on track for delivery, the -9 stretch was postponed from 2010 to at least 2012 and prioritized before the 787-3 and its 43 orders to follow without a firm delivery date.

It kept the -8 length but its 51.7 m wingspan would have fit in ICAO Aerodrome Reference Code D. It was designed to operate on Boeing 757-300/Boeing 767-200 sized regional routes from airports with restricted gate spacing. The wingspan was decreased by using blended winglets instead of raked wingtips.

By January 2010, all orders, from Japan Airlines and All Nippon Airways, had been converted to the 787-8. As it was designed specifically for the Japanese market, Boeing would likely scrap it after they switched orders. The -8's longer wingspan makes it more efficient on stages longer than 200 nmi (370 km; 230 mi). In December 2010, Boeing withdrew the short-haul model as it struggled to produce the 787-8 after program delays of three years.

=== Market and costs ===
LOT Polish Airlines was the first European operator of the 787.

The 787 Dreamliner program has reportedly cost Boeing $32 billion. In 2013, the 787 program was expected to be profitable after 1,100 aircraft have been sold. At the end of 2013, the cost of producing a 787 exceeded the purchase price. Boeing's accounting method books sales immediately and distributes estimated production costs over ten years for the 1,300 aircraft it expects to deliver during that time. JPMorgan Chase analyst Joseph Nadol estimated the program's cash loss to be $45 million per airplane, decreasing as the program moves forward. The actual cash flow reflects Boeing collecting most of the purchase price upon delivery; Boeing expects deferred costs to total $25 billion before the company begins to break even on production; the comparable number for the Boeing 777, adjusted for inflation, is $3.7 billion.

Boeing lost $30 million per 787 delivered in the first quarter of 2015, although Boeing planned to break even by the end of the year. The accumulated losses for the 787 totaled almost $27 billion (~$35.8 billion in 2025) by May 2015. The cost of producing the fuselage may increase because of a tentative deal reached with Spirit Aerosystems of Wichita, Kansas, wherein severe price cuts demanded by Boeing would be eased, in return for a comprehensive agreement that lowers the cost of fuselages for other jetliners that Spirit helps Boeing manufacture.

In the second quarter of 2015, Boeing lost $25 million (~$33.1 million in 2025) on each 787 delivered but was planning to break even per plane before the year-end. After that Boeing hoped to build 900 Dreamliners over six years at an average profit of more than $35 million each. But with deferred costs peaking in 2016 at $33 billion, (~$43.3 billion in 2025) Leeham analyst Bjorn Fehrm believes Boeing cannot make an overall profit on the program. Ted Piepenbrock, an academic affiliated with MIT and the University of Oxford, projects losses decreasing through the first 700 airliners and forecasts the cumulative deferred costs to peak beyond $34 billion. The model most favorable to Boeing projects a program loss of $5 billion after delivering 2,000 Dreamliners. Boeing's original development investment, estimated at least at a further $20 billion, is not included in these costs.

To recoup the deferred costs and earn its goal of a "low single-digit" overall profit margin, Boeing has to make an average profit of more than $50 million on the final 205 airplanes of the accounting block to be delivered from 2020: a profit margin of more than 30% while the mature Boeing 737 and 777 programs have 20% to 25% margins. Boeing is reaching it through a larger proportion of the 20% to 40% higher price -9/10s, costing only 5% to 10% more than the -8 with lower production costs from reliability and producibility investments and the expected experience curve. Former Douglas Aircraft chief economist Adam Pilarski notes that two assembly sites slow the experience curve. Boeing assumed a faster improvement than on previous programs which had not happened. Competition with the Airbus A350 and the launch of the A330neo put strong pressure on the 787 pricing.

On July 21, 2016, Boeing reported charges of $847 million against two flight-test 787s built in 2009. Boeing had planned to refurbish and sell them but instead wrote them off as research and development expense. In 2017, Boeing's Jim Albaugh said that the requested return on net assets (RONA) led to outsourcing systems reducing investment, but improving RONA had to be balanced against the risk of loss of control. From 2019, Boeing was to build 14 787s per month (168 per year), helping to offset the $28 billion in deferred production costs accumulated through 2015 and would add 100 aircraft to the current accounting block of 1,300 at the end of 2017 third quarter. In 2019, the list price for a 787-8 was US$248.3M, $292.5M for a 787-9, and $338.4M for a 787-10.

The valuation for a new 787-9 is $145 million in 2018, up from $135 million in 2014, but it may have been sold for $110–115 million to prevent A330neo sales while an A330-900 is worth $115 million. In February 2018, Boeing priced six 787-9s for less than $100–115m each to Hawaiian Airlines, close to their production cost of $80–90m, to overcome its A330-800 order. By late 2018, deferred production costs were reduced from a peak of $27.6 billion in early 2016 to $23.5 billion as assembly efficiency improved and the 800th production started.

=== Production rate ===
By 2014, Boeing planned to improve financial return by reorganizing the production line, renegotiating contracts with suppliers and labor unions, and increasing the 787 production rate, stepwise, to 12 airplanes per month by the end of 2016 and 14 airplanes per month by the end of the decade. By April 2015, the production rate was 10 per month.

From late 2020, the production rate is to be reduced from 14 to 12 airplanes per month due to the China-United States trade war. Production could be trimmed to 10 planes per month as demand for wide-body aircraft falters. On October 1, 2020, Boeing announced the 787 would be produced only in North Charleston from mid-2021 due to the impact of the COVID-19 pandemic on aviation, as the production rate fell to six per month. In December, the monthly rate was further reduced to five.

=== Quality-control issues (2019–2025) ===
==== 2019 ====
In 2019, reports began to emerge about quality-control issues at the North Charleston plant leading to questions about the jet's safety; and later that same year KLM, which had discovered loose seats, missing and incorrectly installed pins, nuts and bolts not fully tightened and a fuel-line clamp left unsecured on its jet, complained that the standard of manufacture was "way below acceptable standards."

==== 2020 ====
Early in 2020, Boeing engineers complained about depressions in the 787's vertical tail fin, affecting hundreds of planes or the vast majority of the fleet. Workers in Charleston and Everett had improperly discarded shims before the final installation of fasteners, which could lead to structural failure under limited loads. In late August 2020, Boeing grounded eight 787s due to such improper fuselage shimming and inner skin surfacing issues—issues which proved to have been discovered in August 2019 at Boeing South Carolina. The different composite fuselage components on the 787 are joined together around the circumference using splice plates. Small variations in the thickness of the fuselage skin may leave gaps between the splice plate and the inner skin of the fuselage. While most of the gaps are closed by fastener force during the joining process, any gaps that remain must be filled using shims, usually made of fiberglass. Issues with this shimming process plagued numerous 787s and required expensive rework of assembled planes before delivery.

The following month, Boeing admitted that "nonconforming" sections of the rear fuselage did not meet engineering standards, and the FAA was investigating quality-control lapses dating back to the introduction of the 787 in 2011 and considering requiring additional inspections for up to 900 of the roughly 1,000 Dreamliners in service. The FAA then began to inquire into the company's Quality Management System (QMS), which Boeing had previously argued justified a reduction of 900 quality inspectors, but which had failed to detect either the shim or skin surface issues. A third quality-control issue then emerged, this time with the 787's horizontal stabilizers, and affecting as many as 893 Dreamliners: workers in Salt Lake City had clamped portions of the tail section too tightly, which could lead to premature material fatigue. At this point Boeing expected a one-time inspection during regularly scheduled maintenance to address the issues and expected merely to slow 787 deliveries "in the near term".

==== 2021 ====
By January 2021, Boeing had halted 787 deliveries to complete the inspection relating to poor quality control, then in March the FAA withdrew Boeing's delegated authority to inspect and sign off on four new 787s, saying that it would extend this withdrawal to further aircraft if needed. Boeing briefly resumed deliveries on March 26, 2021, handing over one 787-9 to United Airlines, but deliveries ceased again in May 2021; meaning that almost all deliveries had been paused for nearly a year. The delay generated $1 billion in abnormal costs and caused the company to cut production to around two planes a month.

On July 13, Boeing discovered gaps at joints in the forward pressure bulkhead and again reduced production; the company also investigated whether the issue affected 787s already in service. Questions were asked about the inspection process used to check the work, and Boeing worked with the FAA to fix the problem, which was said to pose "no immediate threat to flight safety" and did not require 787s already in service to be grounded.

On September 4, the Wall Street Journal reported that the FAA would not accept Boeing's proposed new inspection method, aiming to speed deliveries with targeted checks rather than nose-to-tail teardowns, until at least late October; and in late November it was reported that the FAA had discovered further problems, including additional out of tolerance gaps and contamination and associated weakening of fuselage composites. The rectification process for existing aircraft was made more complex by a lack of detailed configuration data on each aircraft. The new problems and the extension of the 13 month long disruption to 787 deliveries led to anger from buyers; a slide in the company's stock price; and demands by a subcommittee of the US House of Representatives for a review of the FAA's oversight of the plane.

==== 2022 ====
In January 2022, it was reported that deliveries were not anticipated to restart until April 2022. In February, the FAA announced that it would withdraw Boeing's delegated authority to issue airworthiness certificates for individual 787 aircraft until Boeing can demonstrate consistent quality, stable delivery processes, and a robust plan for the rework needed on the undelivered aircraft in storage. In late March Boeing began sounding out suppliers about their ability to support the production of up to seven aircraft a month by late 2023. Vistara, which had been expecting delivery of four Dreamliners in 2022, indicated a lack of confidence in Boeing meeting its delivery aims by arranging to lease aircraft instead. Later in April reports began to emerge of a further delay of at least two months, and it was only in late April that Boeing submitted the necessary certification package laying out the inspections and repairs to be undertaken on already constructed planes. The FAA rejected portions of the package as incomplete and returned it to Boeing, indicating a further delay before the resumption of deliveries. In late July, the FAA approved Boeing's revised certification package, leading the company to anticipate resuming deliveries "within days". Deliveries resumed on August 10, 2022, after the FAA granted clearance. Between November 2020 and August 2022, only 14 787s were delivered.

==== 2023 ====
In January 2023, Boeing stated that the 787 fuselage gap problem and the subsequent halt in deliveries had cost Boeing $6.3 billion in "abnormal costs".

In February 2023, a further problem, of an analysis error by a supplier related to the 787 forward pressure bulkhead, was identified, leading to a further temporary halt in deliveries (but not in production) and a 5% drop in the company's share price. On March 10, the FAA approved the resumption of the deliveries.

==== 2024 ====
In April 2024, Boeing engineer Sam Salehpour alleged that the 787's (as well as the 777's) fuselage had been improperly assembled and that it could cause individual aircraft to break apart in mid-air. Salehpour also claimed that he tried to raise these concerns to Boeing but was reprimanded by the company. The FAA is investigating Salehpour's allegations. Boeing released a statement rejecting these claims.

==== 2025 ====
In early 2025, Italian authorities discovered a fraud scheme involving over 4,800 parts. The investigation indicated that Manufacturing Process Specification (MPS), an Italian supplier, and its subcontractors had falsified quality certifications for the components used in the Dreamliner.

Boeing announced in February 2025 that it had completed rework on the 122 787s that had to be stored long-term until the structural issues discovered in 2020 - shimming issues with the small gaps at the fuselage joins - could be repaired. The last jet that exited the rework program in February 2025 was a 787-10 built in South Carolina in December 2020. The "shadow factory" rework program had pulled hundreds of mechanics away from regular production work.

=== Range and payload increases ===
Increases to the maximum takeoff weight (iMTOW) for the 787-9 and 787-10 had been planned since at least 2019, and Boeing formally acknowledged the planned Increased Ground Weight (IGW) variants in January 2022. On the 787-9, MTOW would increase by approximately 11,000 pounds (4,989.5 kg), enabling about 6,600 lb (2,993.7 kg) additional payload or more than 300 nautical miles (350 mi; 560 km) of additional range. On the 787-10, MTOW would increase by approximately 14,000 pounds (6,350.3 kg), enabling about 11,000 lb (4,989.5 kg) additional payload or more than 400 nautical miles (460 mi; 740 km) of additional range. These MTOW increases were approved by the FAA in March 2026. All 787-9s and 787-10s produced since December 2025 are structurally capable of the higher MTOW rating, though airlines may choose a lower MTOW certification as the certified operating weights may affect airport fees and route planning.

== Design ==
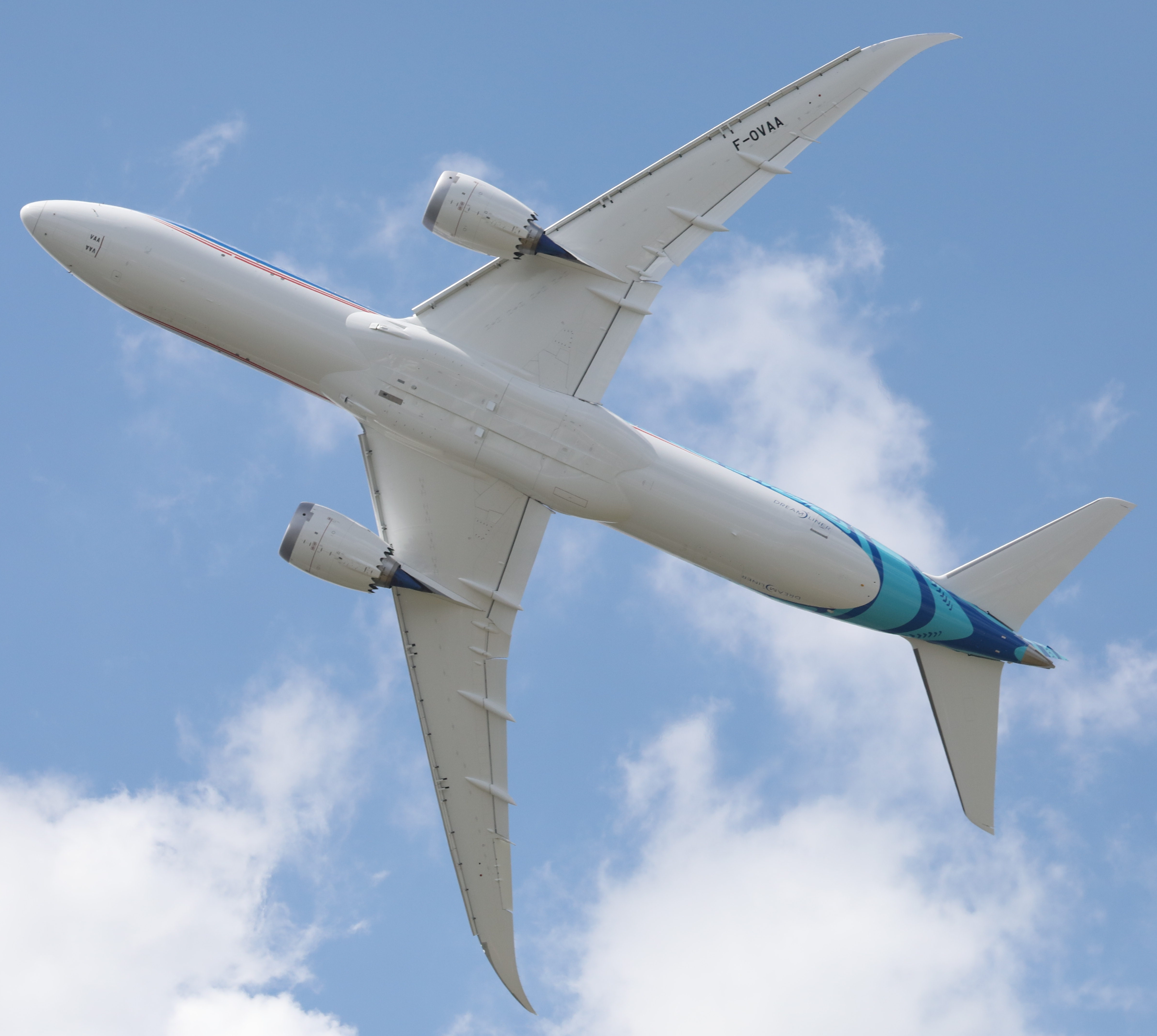
Planform view of an Air Tahiti Nui 787-9 showing its 9.6 wing aspect ratio and 32° wing sweep

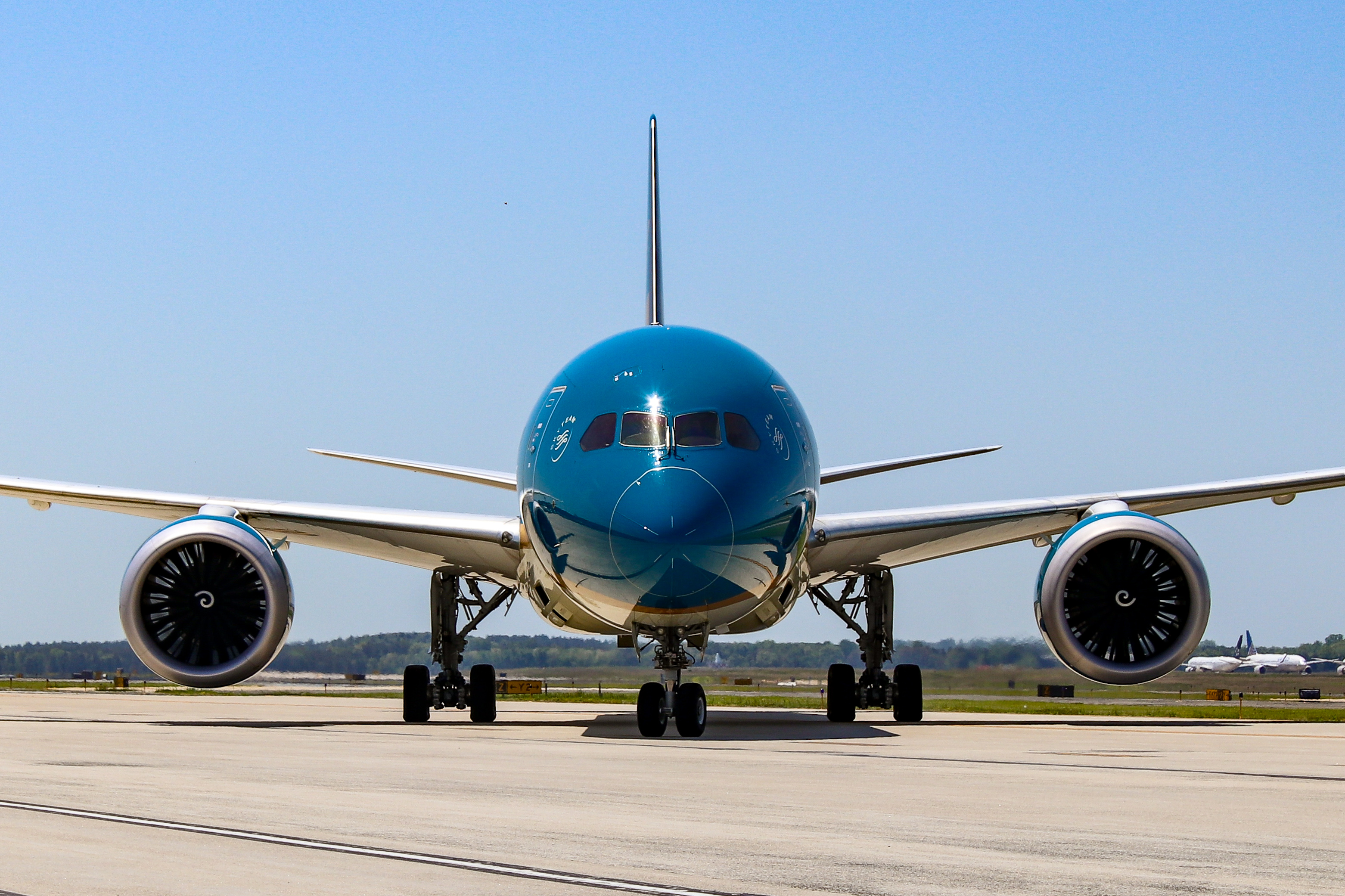
Front view of a Vietnam Airlines 787-10, the fuselage is 19 ft (5.8 m) wide and 19 1/2 ft (5.94 m) high while the fan has a 111 in (2.8 m) diameter

The Boeing 787 Dreamliner is a long-haul, widebody, twin-engine jetliner, designed with lightweight structures that are 80% composite by volume; Boeing lists its materials by weight as 50% composite, 20% aluminum, 15% titanium, 10% steel, and 5% other materials. Aluminum has been used throughout the leading edges of wings and tailplanes, titanium is predominantly present within the elements of the engines and fasteners, while various individual components are composed of steel.

External features include a smooth nose contour, raked wingtips, and engine nacelles with noise-reducing serrated edges (chevrons). The longest-range 787 variant can fly up to 7,565 nmi (14,010 km; 8,710 mi), or the even longer Qantas QF 9 flight between Perth and London Heathrow, over 7,828 nmi (14,497 km; 9,008 mi). Its cruising airspeed is Mach 0.85 (488 kn; 903 km/h; 561 mph). The aircraft has a design life of 44,000 flight cycles.

=== Flight systems ===
Among 787 flight systems, a key change from traditional airliners is the electrical architecture. The architecture is bleedless and replaces bleed air with electrically powered compressors and four of six hydraulic power sources with electrically driven pumps while eliminating pneumatics and hydraulics from some subsystems, e.g. engine starters and brakes. Boeing says that this system extracts 35% less power from the engines, allowing increased thrust and improved fuel efficiency. Spoiler electromechanical actuators (SEMAs) control two of the seven spoiler pairs on each wing surface, providing roll control, air and ground speed brake, and droop capabilities similar to those provided by the hydraulic actuators used on the remaining spoiler surfaces. The SEMAs are controlled by electronic motor control units (EMCUs).

The total available onboard electrical power is 1.45 megawatts, which is five times the power available on conventional pneumatic airliners. Electrically powered systems include engine start, cabin pressurization, horizontal-stabilizer trim, and wheel brakes. Wing ice protection is another new system; it uses electro-thermal heater mats on the wing slats instead of traditional hot bleed air. An active gust alleviation system, similar to the system used on the B-2 bomber, improves ride quality during turbulence.

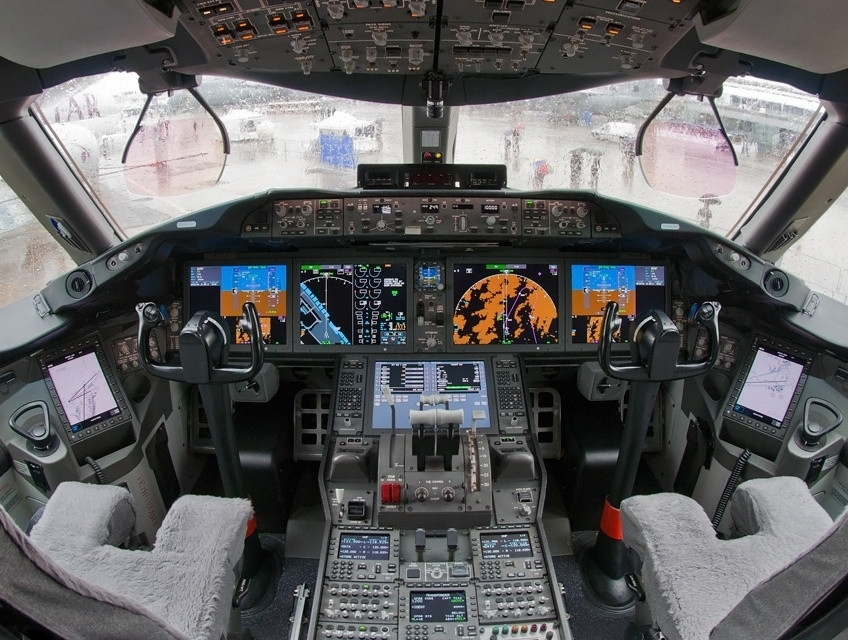
The Boeing 787 flight deck has fly-by-wire controls

The 787 has a "fly-by-wire" control system similar in architecture to that of the Boeing 777. The flight deck features multi-function LCDs, which use an industry-standard graphical user interface widget toolkit (Cockpit Display System Interfaces to User Systems / ARINC 661). The 787 flight deck includes two head-up displays (HUDs) as a standard feature. Like other Boeing airliners, the 787 uses a yoke (as opposed to a side-stick). Under consideration is the future integration of forward-looking infrared into the HUD for thermal sensing, allowing pilots to "see" through clouds. Lockheed Martin's Orion spacecraft will use a glass cockpit derived from Honeywell International's 787 flight deck systems.

Honeywell and Rockwell Collins provide flight control, guidance, and other avionics systems, including standard dual head-up guidance systems, Thales supplies the integrated standby flight display and power management, while Meggitt/Securaplane provides the auxiliary power unit (APU) starting system, electrical power-conversion system, and battery-control system with lithium cobalt oxide (LiCoO_{2}) batteries by GS Yuasa. One of the two batteries weighs 28.5 kg and is rated 29.6 V, 76 Ah, giving 2.2 kWh. Battery charging is controlled by four independent systems to prevent overcharging, following early lab testing. The battery systems were the focus of a regulatory investigation due to multiple lithium battery fires, which led to the grounding of the 787 fleet starting in January 2013.

A version of Ethernet (Avionics Full-Duplex Switched Ethernet (AFDX) / ARINC 664) transmits data between the flight deck and aircraft systems. The control, navigation, and communication systems are networked with the passenger cabin's in-flight internet systems. In January 2008, FAA concerns were reported regarding possible passenger access to the 787's computer networks; Boeing has stated that various protective hardware and software solutions are employed, including air gaps to physically separate the networks, and firewalls for software separation. These measures prevent data transfer from the passenger internet system to the maintenance or navigation systems.

The -9/10 hybrid laminar flow control (HLFC) system delays the critical transition from laminar to turbulent flow as far back as possible on the vertical tail by passive suction from leading-edge holes to mid-fin low-pressure doors but was dropped from the tailplane due to lower benefits than the extra complexity and cost.

=== Airframe ===
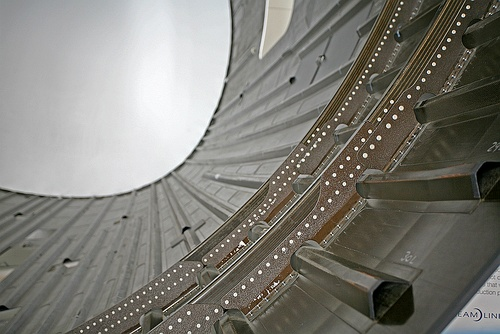
Preassembly composite fuselage section of the Boeing 787

The 787 is the first commercial aircraft to have an airframe majority made of carbon fiber reinforced polymer (CFRP), applied in: the empennage, fuselage, wings, doors, and in most other main components. Each 787 contains approximately 77,000 lb (35 t) of CFRP, made with 51,000 lb (23 t) of pure carbon fiber. CFRP materials have a higher strength-to-weight ratio than conventional aluminum structural materials, which contributes significantly to the 787's weight savings, as well as superior fatigue behavior. Historically, the first CFRP primary structure in Boeing commercial aircraft was put into service in 1984 on the horizontal tail of the Boeing 737 Classic, and in the mid-1990s on both vertical and horizontal tail (empennage) of the Boeing 777. In the early 2000s, while studying the proposed Sonic Cruiser, Boeing built and tested the first CFRP fuselage section for commercial aircraft, to evaluate materials and manufacturing techniques which later applied to the Dreamliner. Instead of designing one-piece composite fuselage barrels like the 787, the competing Airbus A350 uses a slightly more conventional approach with CFRP panels on CFRP frames, which is considered less risky in terms of assembly tolerance between fuselage sections.

Safety can be a concern due to lower impact energy absorption and poorer fire, smoke and toxicity capability of CFRP fuselages in the event of a crash landing, leading to whistleblower complaints at Boeing by Vince Weldon, who was fired in 2006. The Occupational Safety and Health Administration (OSHA) later denied Weldon whistleblower status "largely on the grounds that Boeing's 787 design does not violate any FAA regulations or standards". Boeing further argued that CFRP structures have been used on empennages and other parts of airliners for many years without incident, and special damage detection procedures will be instituted for the 787 to detect any potential hidden damage.

In the fall of 2004, 787 engineering program leader Walt Gillette made the final decision to use CFRP for the 787's fuselage, a first for a commercial aircraft. Two distinct Boeing sub-groups with expertise in two different materials—CFRP and aluminum alloy—spent months researching how their material would perform for the 787. Therefore, a "fundamental philosophical dichotomy" existed in the group. This is why a single "collaborative" leader rather than the group needed to make the final call on the material.

In 2006, Boeing launched the 787 GoldCare program. This is an optional, comprehensive life-cycle management service, whereby aircraft in the program are routinely monitored and repaired, as needed. Although the first program of its kind from Boeing, post-sale protection programs are not new; such programs are usually offered by third party service centers. Boeing is also designing and testing composite hardware so inspections are mainly visual. This reduces the need for ultrasonic and other non-visual inspection methods, saving time and money.

The Boeing 787 is equipped with two flight recorders—a Forward Flight Recorder (FWD FR) and an Aft Flight Recorder (AFT FR)—each of which units provides the functions traditionally provided by the Flight Data Recorder and the Cockpit Voice Recorder.

=== Interior ===
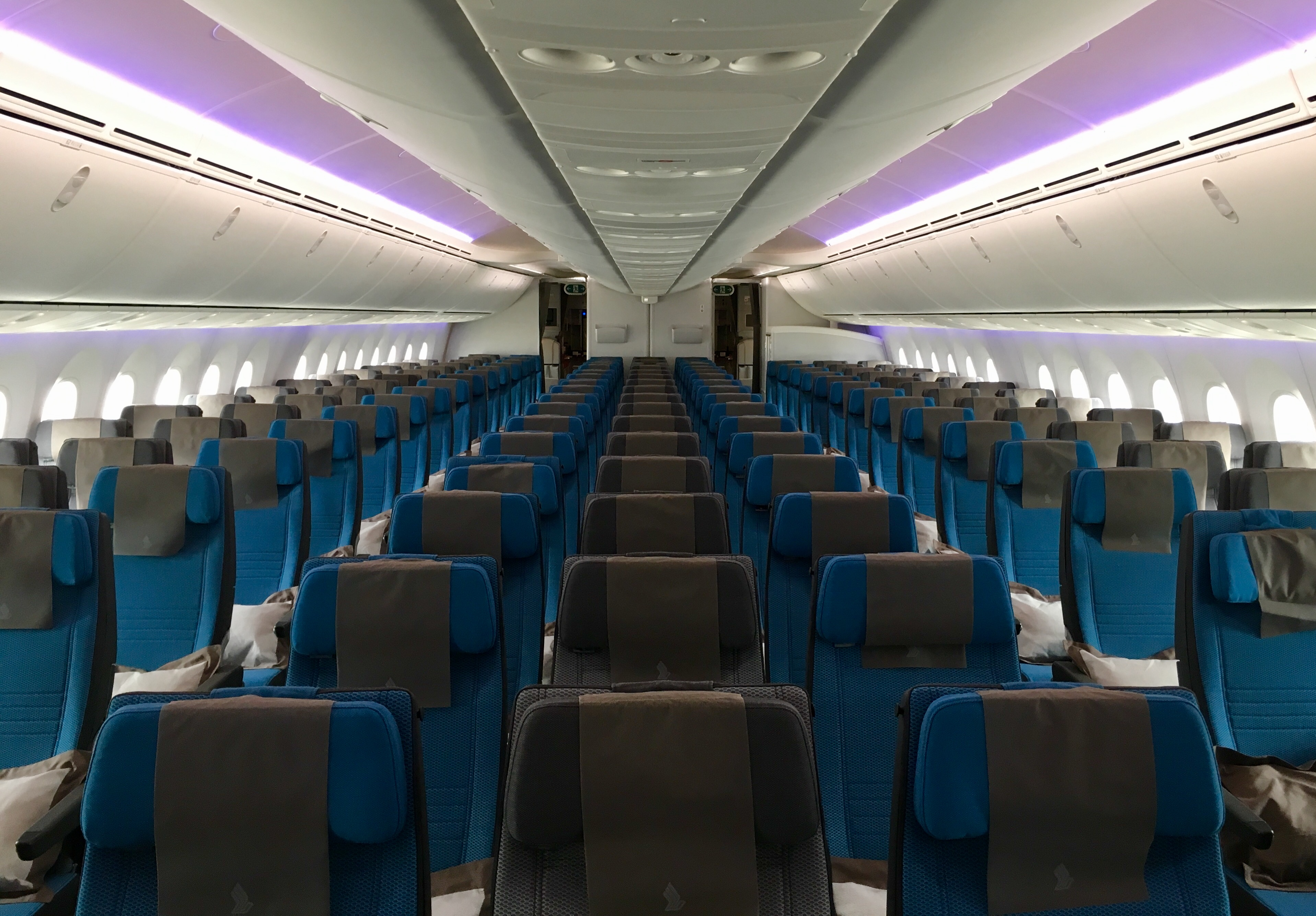
Most airlines have a nine-abreast (3–3–3) economy class, although some select an eight-abreast lower density

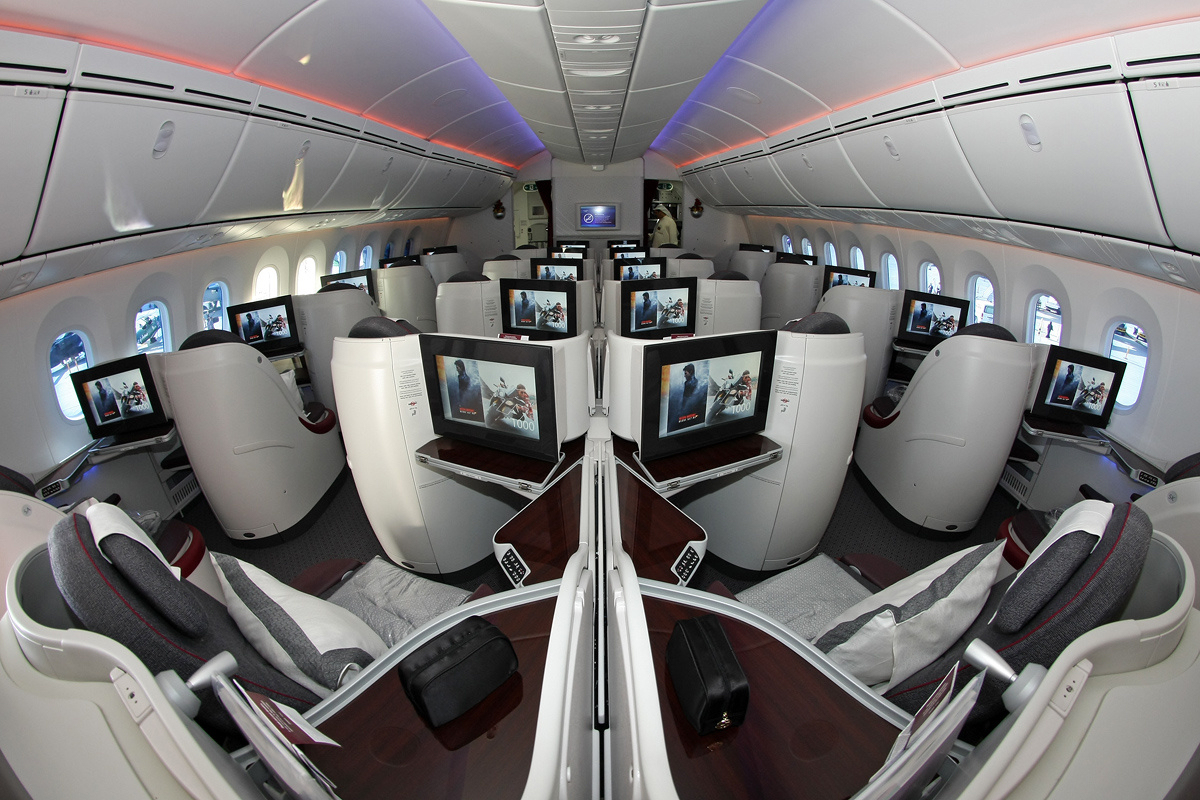
Qatar Airways 787-8 business class cabin in 1–2–1 layout

The 787-8 is designed to typically seat 234 passengers in a three-class setup, 240 in two-class domestic configuration, and 296 passengers in a high-density economy arrangement. Seat rows can be arranged in four to seven abreast in first, business, or premium economy—e.g., 1–2–1, 2–2–2, or 2–3–2. Eight or nine abreast are options in economy—e.g., 2–4–2 or 3–3–3. Typical seat room ranges from 46 to 61 in (120 to 150 cm) pitch in first, 36 to 39 in (91 to 99 cm) in business, and 32 to 34 in (81 to 86 cm) in economy.

Cabin interior width is approximately 18 feet (550 cm) at armrest level. The Dreamliner's cabin width is 15 inches (38 cm) more than that of the Airbus A330 and A340, 5 inches (13 cm) less than the A350, and 16 in (41 cm) less than the 777. The 787's economy seats can be up to 17.5 in (44.4 cm) wide for nine-abreast seating and up to 19 inches (48 cm) wide for eight-abreast seating arrangements. Most airlines are selecting the nine-abreast (3–3–3) configuration. The 787's nine-abreast seating for economy provides passengers less space, particularly across the hips and shoulders, than any other jet airliner. Some observers recommended passengers avoid flying 787s with nine-abreast seating, although others suggested that the 787 is more comfortable than other airliners.

The 787's cabin windows have dimensions of 10.7 by 18.4 in (27 by 47 cm), and a high eye level so passengers can maintain a view of the horizon. The composite fuselage permits larger windows without the need for structural reinforcement. Instead of plastic window shades, the windows use electrochromism-based smart glass (supplied by PPG Industries) allowing flight attendants and passengers to adjust five levels of sunlight and visibility to their liking, reducing cabin glare while maintaining a view to the outside world, but the most opaque setting still has some transparency. While the lavatory window also uses smart glass, it was given a traditional sunshade.

The 787's cabin features light-emitting diodes (LEDs) as standard equipment, allowing the aircraft to be entirely "bulbless". LED lights have previously been an option on the Boeing 777 and Airbus aircraft fitted with standard fluorescent lights. The system has three-color LEDs plus a white LED. The 787 interior was designed to better accommodate persons with mobility, sensory, and cognitive disabilities. For example, a 56 by 57 in (140 by 140 cm) convertible lavatory includes a movable center wall that allows two separate lavatories to become one large wheelchair-accessible facility.

The 787's internal cabin pressure is the equivalent of a 6,000 feet (1,800 m) cabin altitude, which is a higher pressure than the 8,000 feet (2,400 m) cabin altitude of older conventional aircraft. According to Boeing, in a joint study with Oklahoma State University, this significantly improves passenger comfort. Cabin air pressurization is provided by electrically driven compressors, rather than traditional engine-bleed air, thereby eliminating the need to cool heated air before it enters the cabin. The cabin's humidity is programmable based on the number of passengers carried and allows 15% humidity settings instead of the 4% found in previous aircraft. The composite fuselage avoids metal fatigue issues associated with higher cabin pressure and eliminates the risk of corrosion from higher humidity levels. The cabin air-conditioning system improves air quality by removing ozone from outside air and, besides standard HEPA filters, which remove airborne particles, uses a gaseous filtration system to remove odors, irritants, and gaseous contaminants, as well as particulates like viruses, bacteria and allergens.

=== Engines ===
The Boeing 787 has two engine options: the General Electric GEnx-1B and the Rolls-Royce Trent 1000. As of early 2020, of the 1,484 total 787 orders, 905 (61%) had selected General Electric engines, 476 (32%) had chosen Rolls-Royce engines, and 103 (7%) remained undecided.

Both engines use a standardized electrical interface, enabling airlines to install either model with minimal modifications. This interchangeability reduces the time and cost typically associated with switching engine types and is particularly attractive to lessors, as it allows airlines to maintain a common engine type across their fleet when an aircraft changes ownership. While earlier aircraft could accommodate engines from different manufacturers, swaps were rarely performed due to their complexity and expense.

The 787's engines use an all-electric, bleedless system, adapted from the Sonic Cruiser, that eliminates the need for traditional superheated air conduits used for de-icing, cabin pressurization, and other functions. As part of its "Quiet Technology Demonstrator 2" program, Boeing integrated several noise-reduction features into the aircraft. These include an air inlet lined with sound-absorbing materials and an exhaust duct with a chevron-toothed pattern to promote quieter mixing of exhaust with ambient air. Boeing says these technologies make the 787 significantly quieter both inside the cabin and in surrounding areas, with sound levels kept below 85 decibels at airport boundaries.

In 2016, Rolls-Royce began flight testing the Trent 1000 TEN engine, an upgraded version of the Trent 1000 featuring a new compressor system derived from the Trent XWB and a new turbine design for extra thrust, up to 78,000 lbf (350 kN).

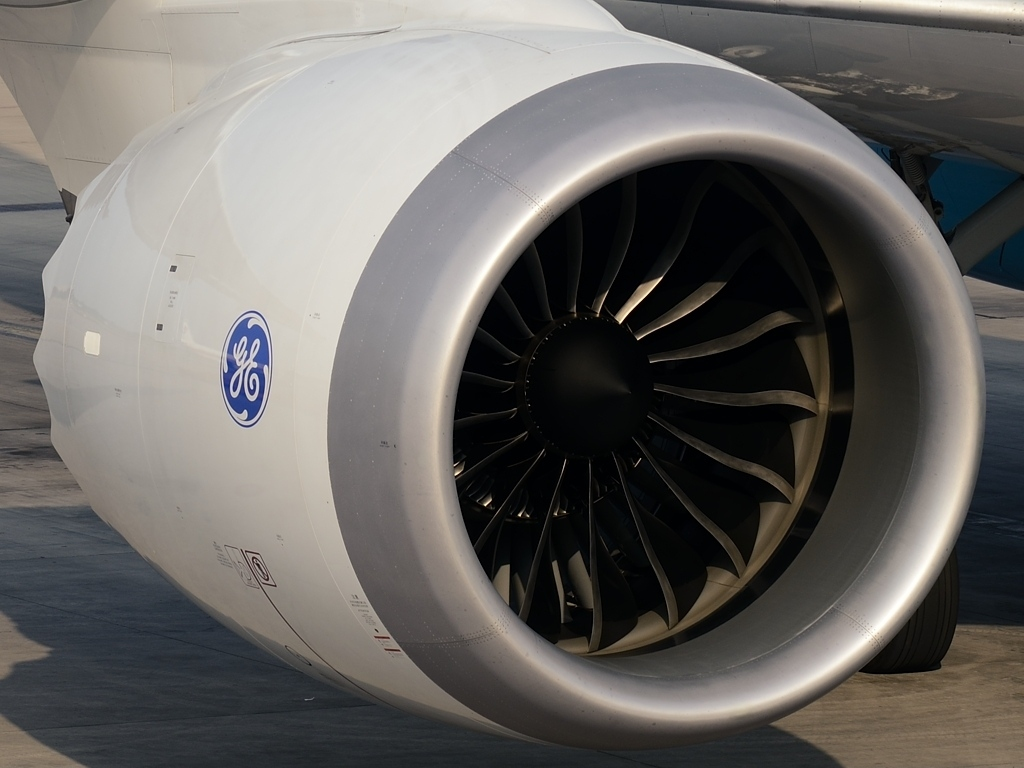
General Electric GEnx with composite fan blades

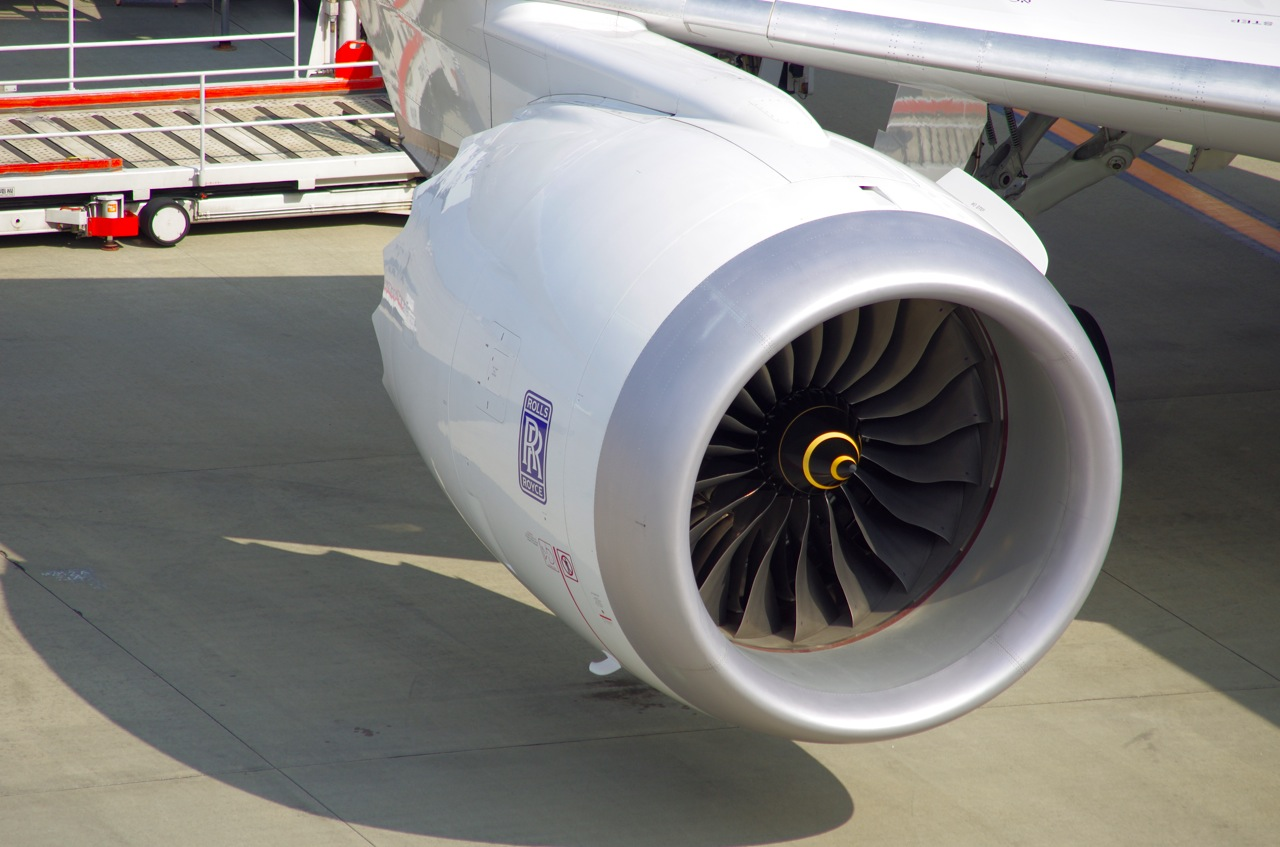
Rolls-Royce Trent 1000 with titanium fan blade

== Operational history ==
On December 6, 2011, test aircraft ZA006 (sixth 787), powered by General Electric GEnx engines, flew 10,710 nmi (19,830 km; 12,320 mi) non-stop from Boeing Field eastward to Shahjalal International Airport in Dhaka, Bangladesh, setting a new world distance record for aircraft in the 787's weight class, which is between 440,000 and 550,000 lb (200 and 250 t). This flight surpassed the previous record of 9,127 nautical miles (16,903 km; 10,503 mi), set in 2002 by an Airbus A330. The Dreamliner then continued eastbound from Dhaka to return to Boeing Field, setting a world-circling speed record of 42 hours, 27 minutes. In December 2011, Boeing started a six-month promotion 787 world tour, visiting various cities in China, Africa, the Middle East, Europe, United States, and others. In April 2012, an ANA 787 made a delivery flight from Boeing Field to Haneda Airport partially using biofuel from cooking oil.

ANA surveyed 800 passengers who flew the 787 from Tokyo to Frankfurt: expectations were surpassed for 90% of passengers; features that met or exceeded expectations included air quality and cabin pressure (90% of passengers), cabin ambiance (92% of passengers), higher cabin humidity levels (80% of passengers), headroom (40% of passengers) and the larger windows (90% of passengers). 25% said they would go out of their way to again fly on the 787.

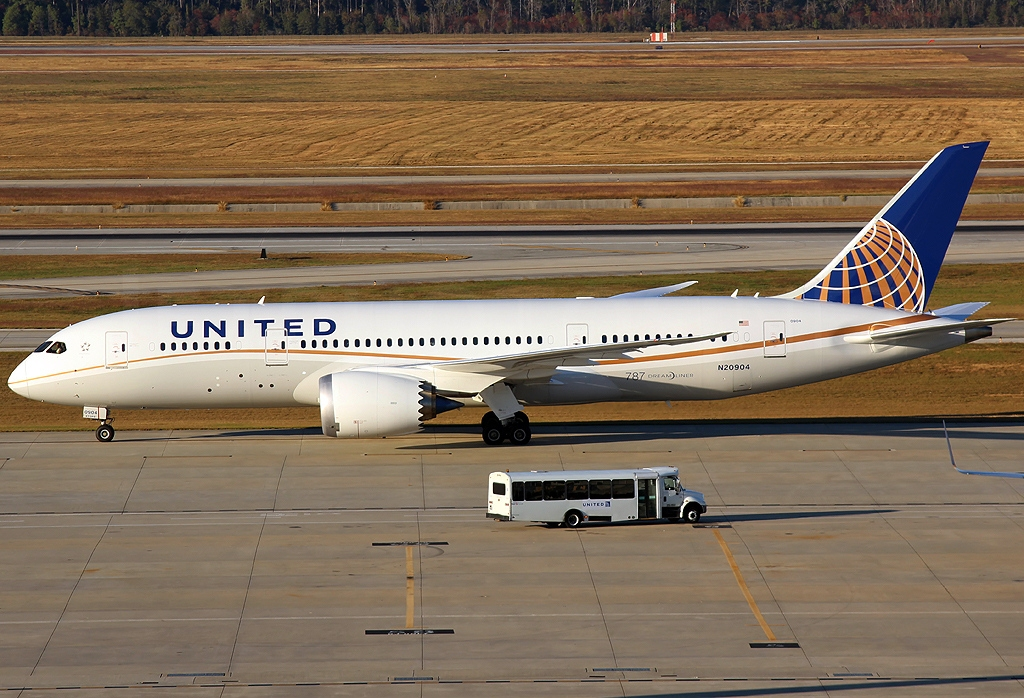
A United Airlines 787-8 at Houston in 2012. United was the North American launch customer for all three 787 variants.

After its first six months of service, Rolls-Royce powered ANA aircraft were burning around 21% less fuel than the replaced 767-300ER on international flights, slightly better than the 20% originally expected, and 15–20% on domestic routes, while GE-powered Japan Airlines aircraft were potentially slightly better. Other 787 operators have reported similar fuel savings, ranging from 20 to 22% compared with the 767-300ER. An analysis by consultant AirInsight concluded that United Airlines' 787s achieved an operating cost per seat that was 6% lower than the Airbus A330. In November 2017, International Airlines Group chief Willie Walsh said that for its budget carrier Level the lower cost of ownership of its two A330-200 more than offsets the 13,000 lb (6 t) higher fuel burn ($3,500 on a Barcelona-Los Angeles flight). It would introduce three more A330s as there were not enough 787 pilots.

Early operators discovered that if the APS5000 auxiliary power unit (APU) was shut down with the inlet door closed, heat continued to build up in the tail compartment and cause the rotor shaft to bow. It could take up to two hours for the shaft to straighten again. This was particularly acute on short haul flights as there was insufficient time to allow the unit to cool before a restart was needed. Procedures were modified and the APU was later redesigned to address the issue.

On September 15, 2012, the NTSB requested the grounding of certain 787s due to GE engine failures; GE believed the production problem had been fixed by that time. In December 2012, responding to unhappiness within the airline industry at the continuing issues affecting the aircraft, Boeing CEO James McNerney stated that he regretted the impact on passengers: he went on to say that the 787's issues had been no greater than those experienced with the introduction of other Boeing models such as the 777.

In March 2014, Mitsubishi Heavy Industries informed Boeing of a new problem that was caused by a change in manufacturing processes. Employees did not fill gaps with shims to connect wing rib aluminum shear ties to the carbon composite wing panels; the tightened fasteners, without shims, cause excessive stress that creates hairline cracks in the wings, which could enlarge and cause further damage. Forty-two aircraft awaiting delivery were affected, and each required one to two weeks to inspect and repair. Boeing did not expect this problem to affect the overall delivery schedule, even if some airplanes were delivered late.

Dispatch reliability is an industry standard measure of the rate of departure from the gate with no more than 15 minutes delay due to technical issues. The 787-8 started out with a ~96% operational reliability, increasing to ~98.5% in April 2015. Daily utilization increased from five hours in 2013 to twelve hours in 2014. Dispatch reliability grew to 99.3% in 2017.

Airlines have often assigned the 787 to routes previously flown by larger aircraft that could not return a profit. For example, Air Canada offered a Toronto-Pearson to New Delhi route, first utilizing a Lockheed L1011, then a Boeing 747-400, then an Airbus A340-300, but none of these types were efficient enough to generate profit. The airline operated the route profitably with a 787-9, and credits the right number of seats and greater fuel efficiency for this success.

Up to June 30, 2017, after 565 units were delivered since 2011: 60% -8 (340) and 40% -9 (225), the airports with most 787 departures are Haneda Airport with 304 weekly, Narita Airport with 276 and Doha Airport with 265. By the end of 2017, there were 39 airlines operating the 787 on 983 routes with an average length of 5,282 km (2,852 nmi; 3,282 mi), including 163 new routes (17%). As of 24 March 2018, the 787's longest route is Qantas' Perth-London Heathrow, a distance of 14,499 km (7,829 nmi; 9,009 mi) and the second-longest regular scheduled flight behind Qatar Airways' 14,529 km (7,845 nmi; 9,028 mi) route from Doha to Auckland, flown with a Boeing 777-200LR. In March 2020, Air Tahiti Nui executed a record commercial flight of 9,765 mi (8,486 nmi; 15,715 km), from Papeete to Paris-Charles de Gaulle, on a route that would typically refuel at Los Angeles but was able to fly the Boeing 787-9 non-stop because it was "nowhere near full" due to the COVID-19 pandemic.

In 2023, the first 787s to be withdrawn from commercial service, two 10-year-old -8s, were torn down by Irish company EirTrade Aviation, as they would otherwise have shortly required 12-year checks and landing-gear overhauls. The used parts were in high demand amid the post-pandemic global shortage. There is no obvious recycling path for the carbon composite airframe.

== Variants ==
Boeing airliners size comparison 787-8 777-300ER 767-300ER 737-800

The shortest Dreamliner variant, the 787-8 was the first variant to fly in December 2009, then the longer 787-9 in September 2013, followed by the longest variant, the 787-10, in March 2017. These variants are called B788, B789, and B78X, respectively in the list of ICAO aircraft type designators. The short-range 787-3 was canceled in 2010.

=== 787-8 ===
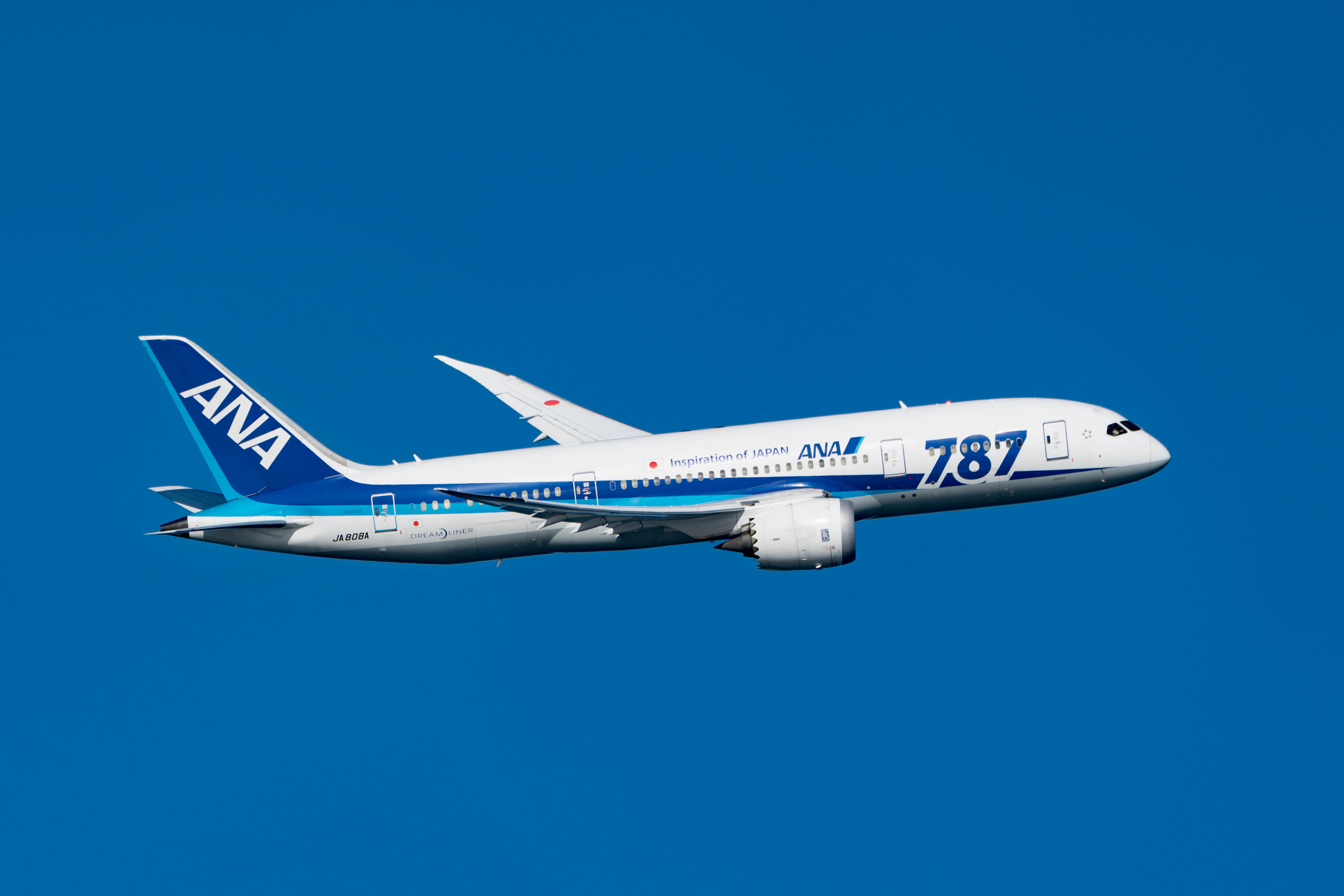
The initial 787-8 is the shortest variant at 186 ft (56.7 m) long, and was introduced into service by All Nippon Airways in October 2011

With a typical capacity of 248 passengers and a range of 7,305 nautical miles (13,529 km; 8,406 mi), the -8 is the base model of the 787 family and was the first to enter service in 2011. The 787-8 is targeted to replace the Boeing 767-200ER as well as expand into new non-stop markets where larger planes would not be economically viable. As of January 2023, approximately 26% of 787 orders are for the 787-8 with 386 delivered.

In 2018, Boeing said it would change the -8 manufacturing to raise its commonality with the -9 above the current 30% to be more like the 95% commonality between the -9 and -10, as it will benefit from learning from those. When it was launched, a new 787-8 was to cost only slightly more than the 767-300ER, valued new for $85 million at its 1990s peak, but it ended being 20% more costly.

=== 787-9 ===
Keeping the same wingspan as the 787-8, the 787-9 is a lengthened and strengthened variant with a 20-foot (6.1 m) longer fuselage and a 54,500-pound (24.7 t) higher maximum take-off weight (MTOW), seating 296 passengers in a typical two-class cabin configuration over a 7,565-nautical-mile (8,706 mi; 14,010 km) range. It features active boundary-layer control on the tail surfaces, reducing drag. The 787-9 is targeted to replace the Boeing 767-300ER. It competes with the Airbus A330-300 and Airbus A330-900.

In 2005, the entry into service (EIS) was planned for 2010. The firm configuration was finalized on July 1, 2010. By October 2011, deliveries were scheduled to begin in 2014.

The prototype 787-9 made its maiden flight from Paine Field on September 17, 2013. By November 8, 2013, it had flown 141 hours. A 787-9 was on static display at the 2014 Farnborough Air Show prior to first delivery. On July 8, 2014, launch customer Air New Zealand took its first 787-9, in a distinctive black livery in a ceremony at Paine Field. The first revenue service was operated by All Nippon Airways on August 7, 2014. Air New Zealand operated its first commercial flight from Auckland to Sydney on August 9, 2014.

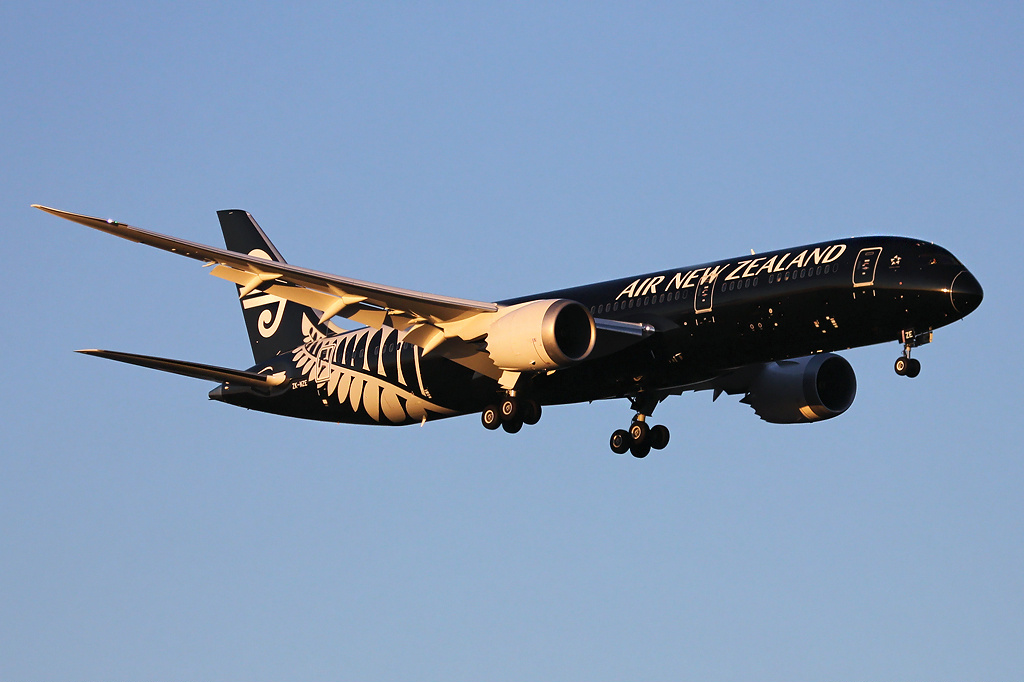
The longer 787-9 (206 ft; 63 m) was introduced by Air New Zealand on August 9, 2014

The 787-9 was to begin commercial service with All Nippon Airways on August 7, 2014. United Airlines was to start the longest nonstop scheduled 787 service between Los Angeles and Melbourne in October 2014, and the longest California-Australia route in 2026, being San Francisco to Adelaide in 2025. Air China started a 787-9 route between Beijing and Chengdu in May 2016. As of January 2023, 63% of all 787 orders are for the 787-9, with 580 deliveries. A 2014 787-9 leased for $1.05 million per month, and fell to $925,000 per month in 2018.

The 20-foot (6.1 m) stretch was achieved by adding 10-foot (3.0 m) (five-frame) extensions forward and aft of the wing The 787-8 and 787-9 have 50% commonality: the wing, fuselage and systems of the 787-8 had required radical revision to achieve the payload-range goals of the 787-9. Following a major revamp of the original 787-8 wing, the latest configuration for the 787-9 and -10 is the fourth design evolution.

On March 25, 2018, a Qantas 787-9 completed the first scheduled non-stop flight between Australia and the UK flying seventeen hours from Perth to London Heathrow. On October 20, 2019, a Qantas 787-9 was flight tested from New York to Sydney with a restricted payload. A team of researchers monitored passengers and crew to investigate wellness and performance on long flights. On March 16, 2020, an Air Tahiti Nui 787-9 achieved the longest commercial flight of 8,485 nmi (15,714 km; 9,764 mi).

=== 787-10 ===
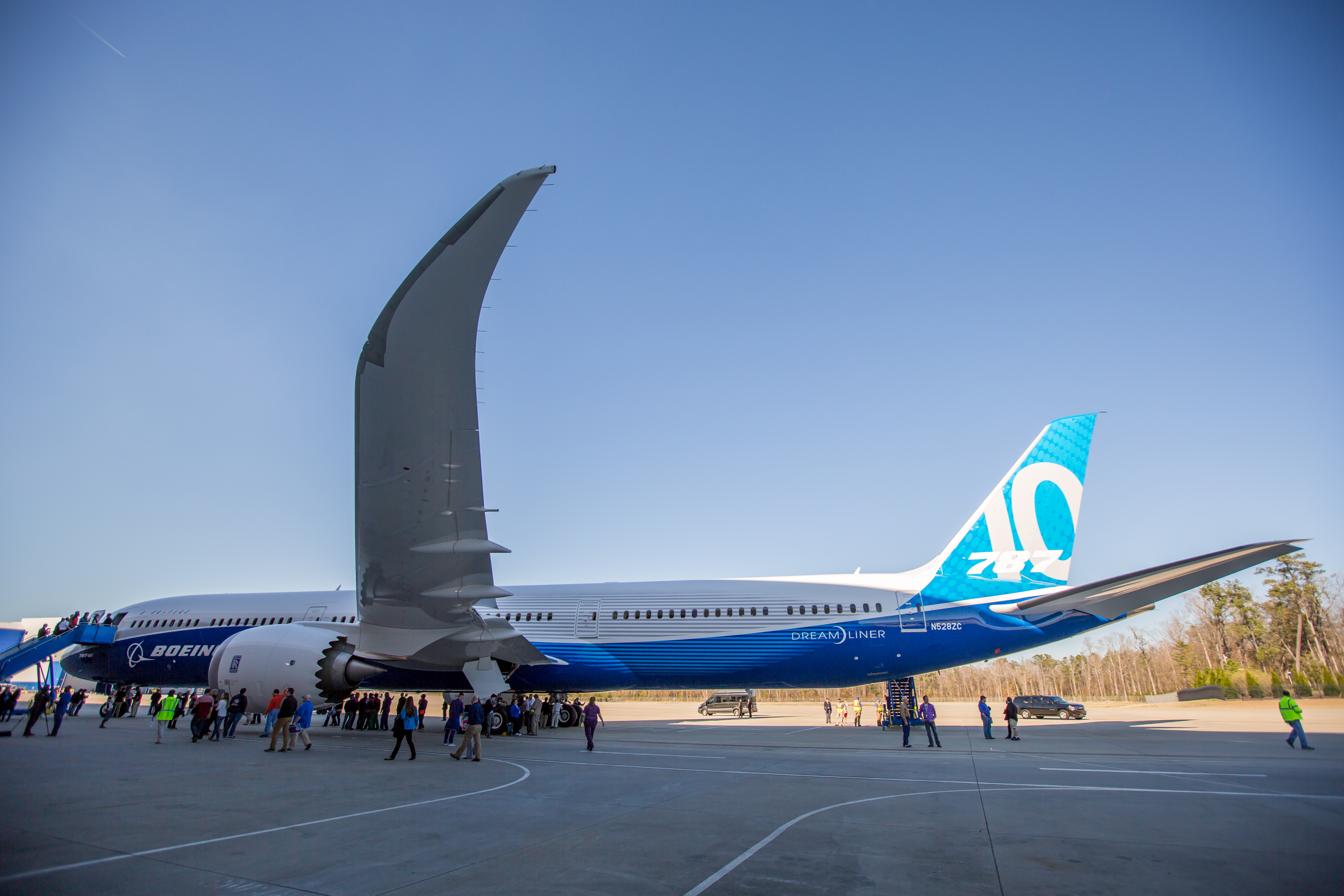
Rollout of 787-10 on February 17, 2017. The -10 is the longest 787 variant at 224 ft (68 m).

In December 2005, pushed by the interest of Emirates and Qantas, Boeing was studying the possibility of stretching the 787-9 further to seat 290 to 310 passengers. This variant would be similar to the capacity of the Boeing 777-200 and the Airbus A350-900, although with a shorter range. Customer discussions were continuing in early 2006. Mike Bair, Boeing's vice president and general manager for the 787 development program at the time, said it was easier to proceed with the 787-10 development after other customers followed Emirates' request. This variant is targeted to replace the Boeing 767-400ER and Airbus A330-300.

On May 30, 2013, Singapore Airlines became the launch customer by stating it would order 30 787-10s (provided Boeing launched the program), to be delivered in 2018–2019. On June 18, 2013, Boeing officially launched the 787-10 at the Paris Air Show, with orders or commitments for 102 aircraft from Air Lease Corporation (30), Singapore Airlines (30), United Airlines (20), British Airways (12), and GE Capital Aviation Services (10). As of January 2023, the aircraft has 189 orders out of which 115 have been delivered, 7 of which are stored.

This variant was envisioned as replacing Boeing 777-200 and Airbus A340-500 aircraft. It competes with the Airbus A350-900, and according to Boeing, it offers better economics than its Airbus competitor on shorter routes. Steven Udvar-Hazy said, "If it's identically configured, the -10 has a little bit of an edge on the -900", but smaller than Boeing's estimate of 10 percent. The 787-10 is 224 ft (68 m) long, seats 336 passengers in a two-class cabin configuration, and has a range of 6,330 nmi (11,720 km; 7,280 mi).

Boeing completed detailed design for the -10 on December 2, 2015. Major assembly began in March 2016. Designers targeted 90% commonality between the 787-9 and -10 and achieved 95%; the 18-foot (5.5 m) stretch was reached by adding 10 ft (3 m) forward of the wing and 8 ft (2.4 m) aft, and by strengthening the fuselage for bending loads in the center wingbox. Because of the length and additional tail strike protection needed, a semilevered landing gear enables rotation over the aft wheels rather than at the bogie center, like the 777-300ER, and the cabin air conditioning system has 15% more capacity. The first and third -10 test-platforms incorporate Rolls-Royce's new Trent 1000 TEN engines, while the second is powered by the competing General Electric GEnx-1B engine.

Major fuselage parts were received for final assembly on November 30, 2016. The 787-10's mid-fuselage sections are too large for transport to Everett, Washington and it is built only in Charleston, South Carolina; it is the first Boeing airliner assembled exclusively there. The first -10 was rolled out on February 17, 2017. The variant's first flight took place on March 31, 2017, and lasted 4 hours and 48 minutes.

The first test 787-10 aircraft is engaged in flight envelope expansion work and the second joined the program in early May 2017, while the third with a passenger cabin interior to test the uprated environmental control system and Trent fuel-burn performance was scheduled to join in June. The -10 was scheduled to appear at the 2017 Paris Air Show. The second -10 is being used to prove the GE Aviation engines and the third made its first flight on June 8, 2017, when the flight-test programme was 30% complete. Boeing finished final assembly and painting of the first production 787-10 in October 2017, before its certification. The last stages of flight tests focused on fuel burn validation and revised flight control software.

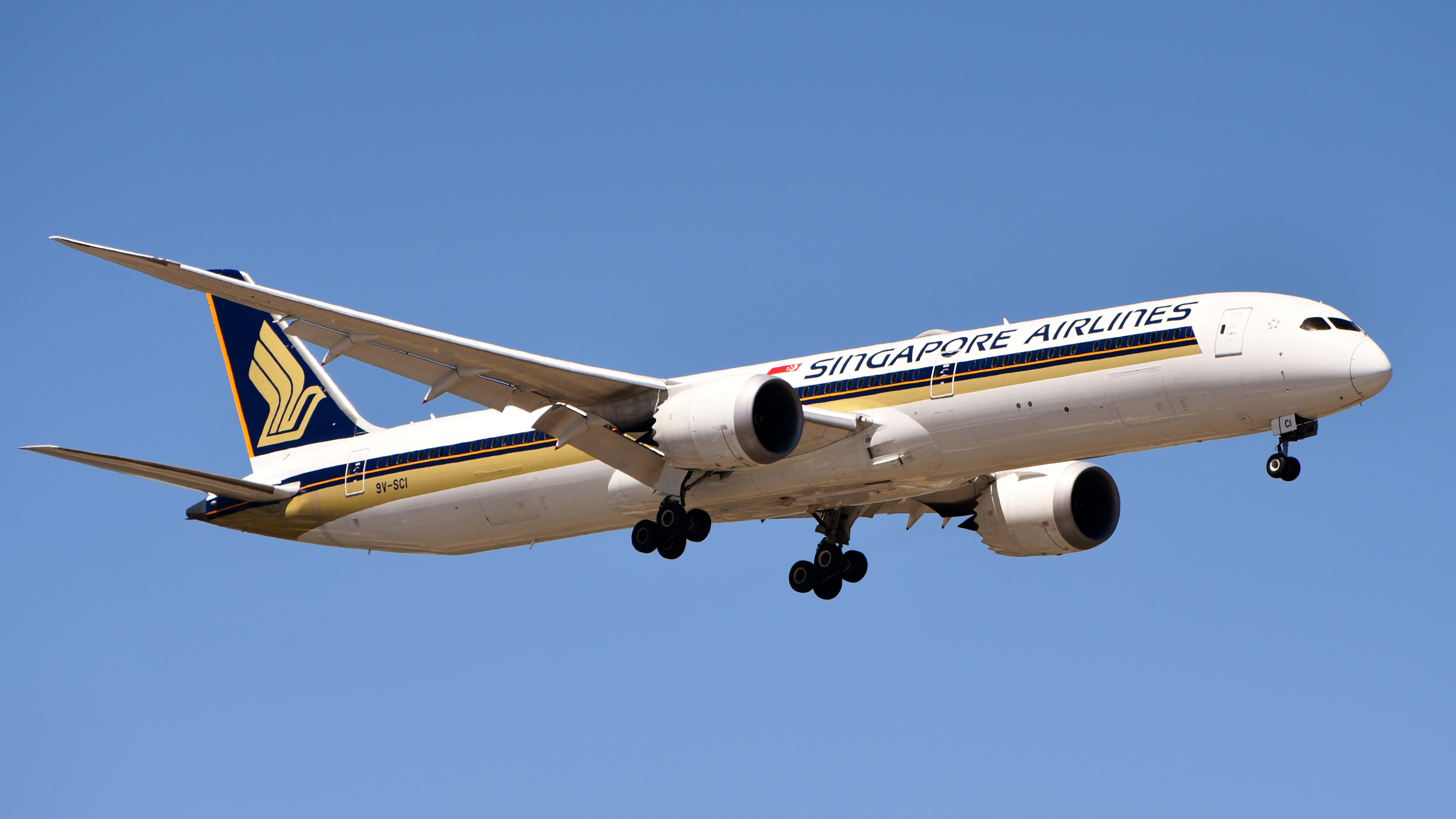
A 787-10 of Singapore Airlines, the launch customer of the variant

At the start of the November 2017 Dubai Air Show, the 787-10 had 171 orders; Emirates committed to 40 787-10s, in two- and three-class cabins for 240 to 330 passengers, to be delivered from 2022 and with conversion rights to the smaller 787-9. These aircraft are adapted for 7–8.5 hour missions, in a 280-seat three–class layout. Emirates' Tim Clark was doubtful it would meet its MTOW for the payload-range required with initial 70,000–72,000 lbf (310–320 kN) thrust engines, but with the current 76,000 lbf (340 kN) turbofans and the -9 early margins gave the -10 "stellar economics". By early 2019, Emirates was considering canceling its 787-10 order, due to engine margins being insufficient for the hot Dubai weather, in favor of the Airbus A350 (which would also replace its last Airbus A380 order). At the 2019 Dubai Air Show, Emirates placed an order for 30 787-9 aircraft rather than the 787-10.

In January 2018, the -10 was certified by the FAA after testing for 900 flight hours. Boeing received its production certificate on February 15. It was first delivered to launch customer Singapore Airlines on March 25, 2018. Fitted with 337 seats, 36 in business and 301 in economy, the -10 began commercial service on April 3, 2018.

The 8.7% fuselage stretch from the -9 to the -10 likely increased empty weight at a lower rate than the 7.4% growth from the -8 to the -9 due to the 10.7% stretch. Software changes increased the tailplane effectiveness to avoid modifying it. With the same wing but a longer fuselage than the -9, the flutter margin was reduced for the -10 but to avoid stiffening the wing or adding wingtip counterweights for commonality, software oscillates the elevators in the flaps up vertical mode suppression system (F0VMS), similar to the vertical gust load alleviation system.

To replace Air New Zealand's 777-200 fleet, Boeing wants to increase the 787-10 MTOW by over 13,000 pounds (5.9 t) to 572,000 pounds (259 t) with some reinforcements and updated fuel systems. This would allow more range, such as the 5,600 nmi (10,400 km; 6,400 mi) trip from Auckland to Los Angeles with no passenger restrictions and some cargo. The increased performance could trickle down to the 787-9, allowing Auckland to New York flights.

=== BBJ 787 ===
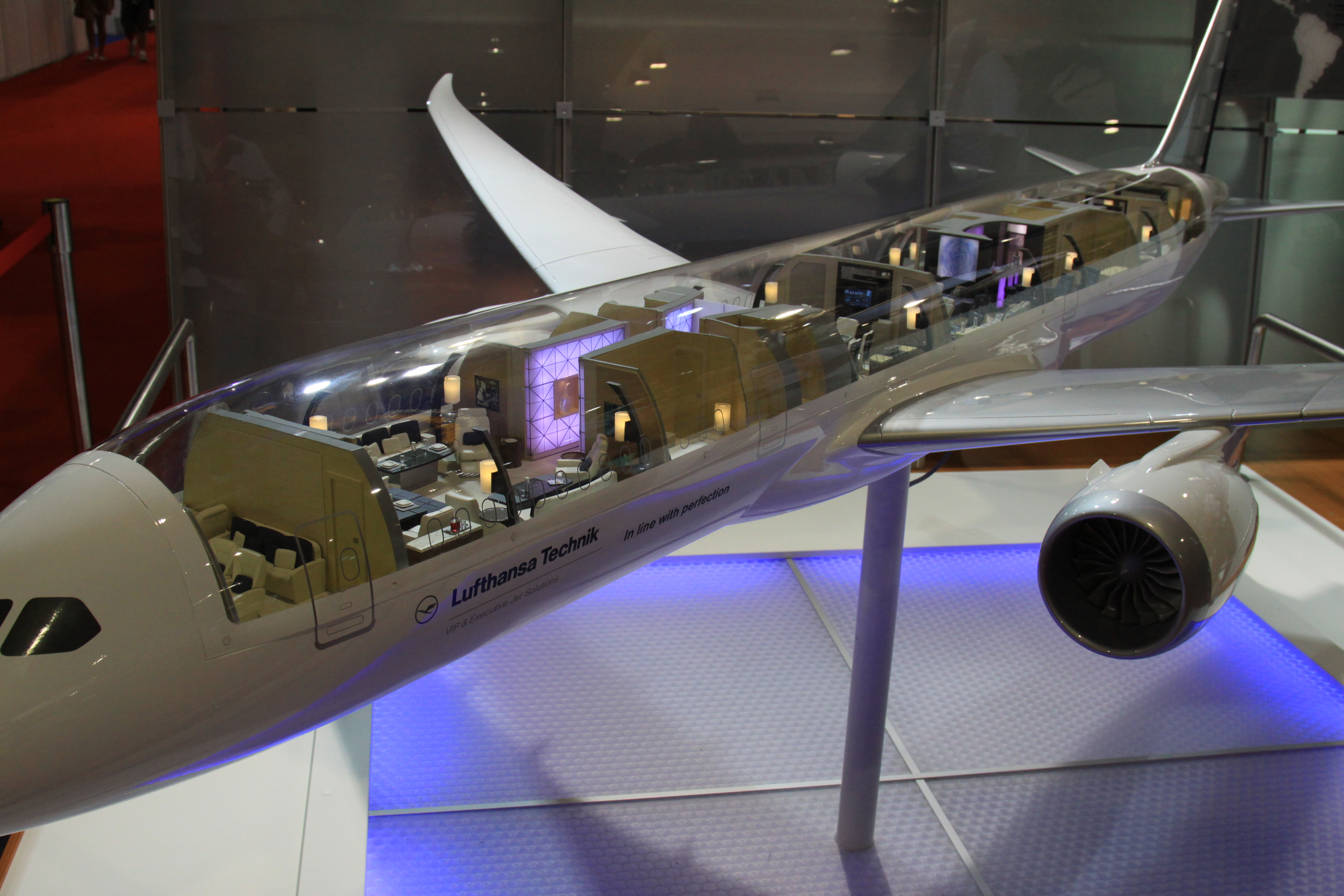
Lufthansa Technik model of 787 VIP interior

The 787-8 and -9 are offered as Boeing Business Jets, the first offering 2,415 ft^{2} (224.4 m^{2}) of floor space and a range of 9,945 nmi (18,418 km; 11,445 mi)), the other 2,775 ft^{2} (257.8 m^{2}) and 9,485 nmi (17,566 km; 10,915 mi), both with 25 passengers. Through June 2018, fifteen have been ordered, twelve delivered and four were in service.

=== Experimental ===
Two 787 aircraft have been used in Boeing's ecoDemonstrator program which aims to develop technology and techniques to reduce the environmental effects of aviation. The testing involves many partner organizations including engine and systems manufacturers, NASA, academic, research, and regulatory institutions. The program started in 2011 with a different airframe being used each year.

In 2014, the fourth prototype 787-8 was used for tests including use of sustainable aviation fuel, ceramic matrix composite engine exhaust nozzles, and systems for improved air traffic control (ATC) communications and closer landing approach spacing. In 2020, a new 787-10 took part in the program, including intensive noise reduction trials, and including text-based ATC communications and cabin hygiene and cleansing tests related to the COVID-19 pandemic. After removal of the test equipment, the aircraft was delivered to Etihad Airways.

In April 2023, Boeing announced the ecoDemonstrator Explorer program, which would run alongside the ecoDemonstrator program. The first Explorer program in 2023 tested international route planning (trajectory-based operations – a major aim of the FAA's NextGen project) and maximization of sustainable aviation fuel use for a planned 10% fuel efficiency gain, using a 787-10.

=== Comparison ===
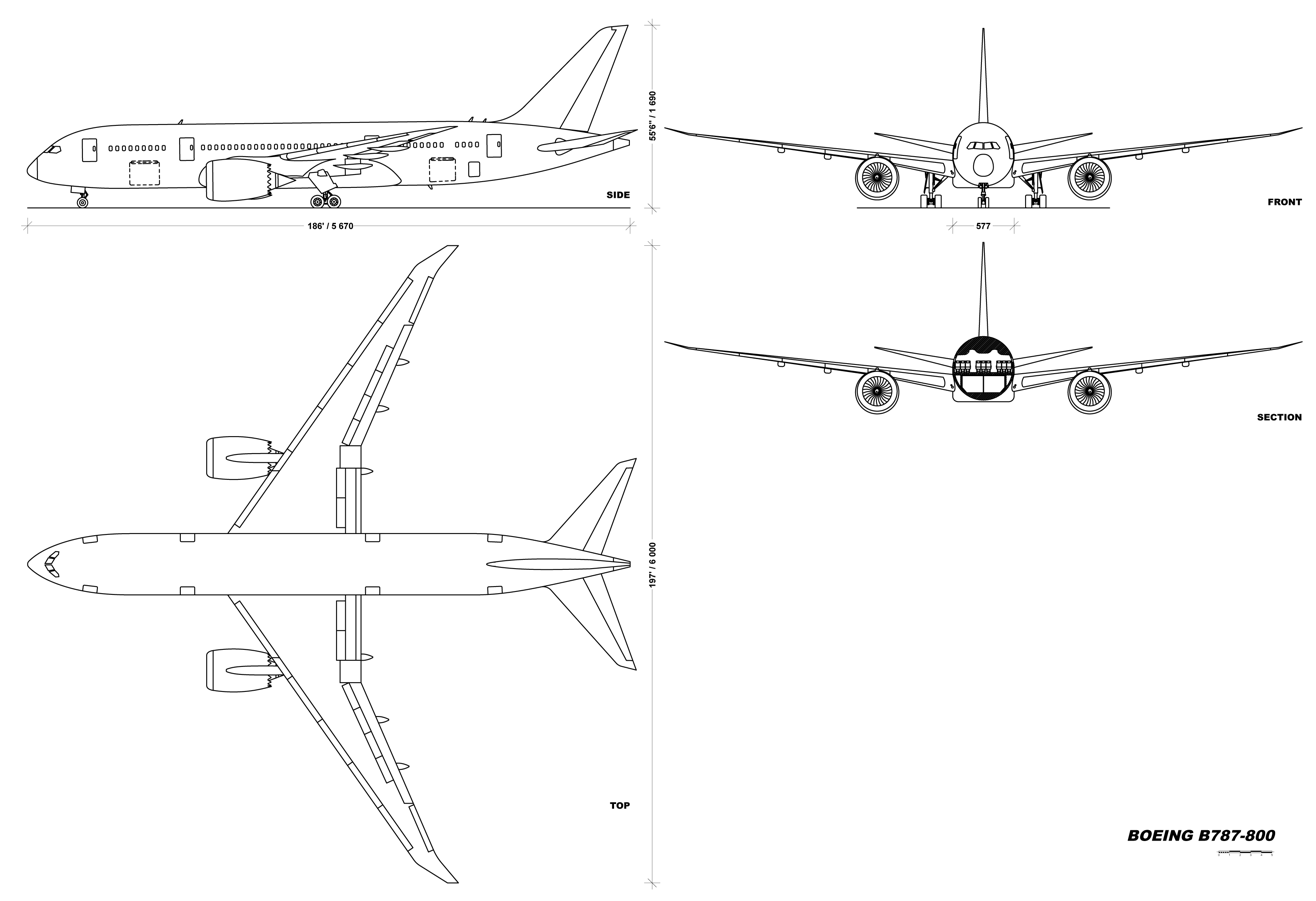
Schematic of the Boeing 787-8: side, top, front, cross-section views

External image
- Boeing 787-8 cutaway
- Cutaway drawing from Flight International

Below is a list of major differences between the 787 variants.

787 characteristics
Model	787-8	787-9	787-10
Seating, 2-class	242	290	330
Seating, 1-class	359	406	440
Length	186 ft 1 in (56.72 m)	206 ft 1 in (62.81 m)	224 ft (68.28 m)
Cargo capacity	4,826 ft^{3} / 136.7 m^{3} 28 LD3 or 9 (88×125) pallets	6,090 ft^{3} / 172 m^{3} 36 LD3 or 11 (96×125) pallets	6,722 ft^{3} / 190.3 m^{3} 40 LD3 or 13 (96×125) pallets
Maximum takeoff weight	502,500 lb / 227,900 kg	571,500 lb / 259,200 kg	574,000 lb / 260,400 kg
Maximum payload	90,500 lb / 41,100 kg	116,000 lb / 53,000 kg	126,300 lb / 57,277 kg
Operating empty weight	264,500 lb / 120,000 kg	284,000 lb / 129,000 kg	298,700 lb / 135,500 kg
Range	Up to 8,000 nmi (14,820 km; 9,210 mi) (Note: 8000 nmi/9210 mi range achieved with a 20.4 t (45,000 lb) payload.)	Up to 8,300 nmi (15,370 km; 9,550 mi) (Note: 8300 nmi/9550 mi range achieved with a 25 t (55,000 lb) payload.)	Up to 7,500 nmi (13,890 km; 8,630 mi) (Note: 7500 nmi/8630 mi range achieved with a 22.6 t (50,000 lb) payload.)
Takeoff (Note: At maximum takeoff weight, International Standard Atmosphere, sea-level, hi thrust.)	8,500 ft (2,600 m)	9,300 ft (2,800 m)	9,100 ft (2,800 m)
Ceiling	43,100 ft (13,100 m)		41,100 ft (12,500 m)
Engine thrust (×2)	64,000 lbf (280 kN)	71,000 lbf (320 kN)	76,000 lbf (340 kN)
ICAO designation	B788	B789	B78X

== Operators ==
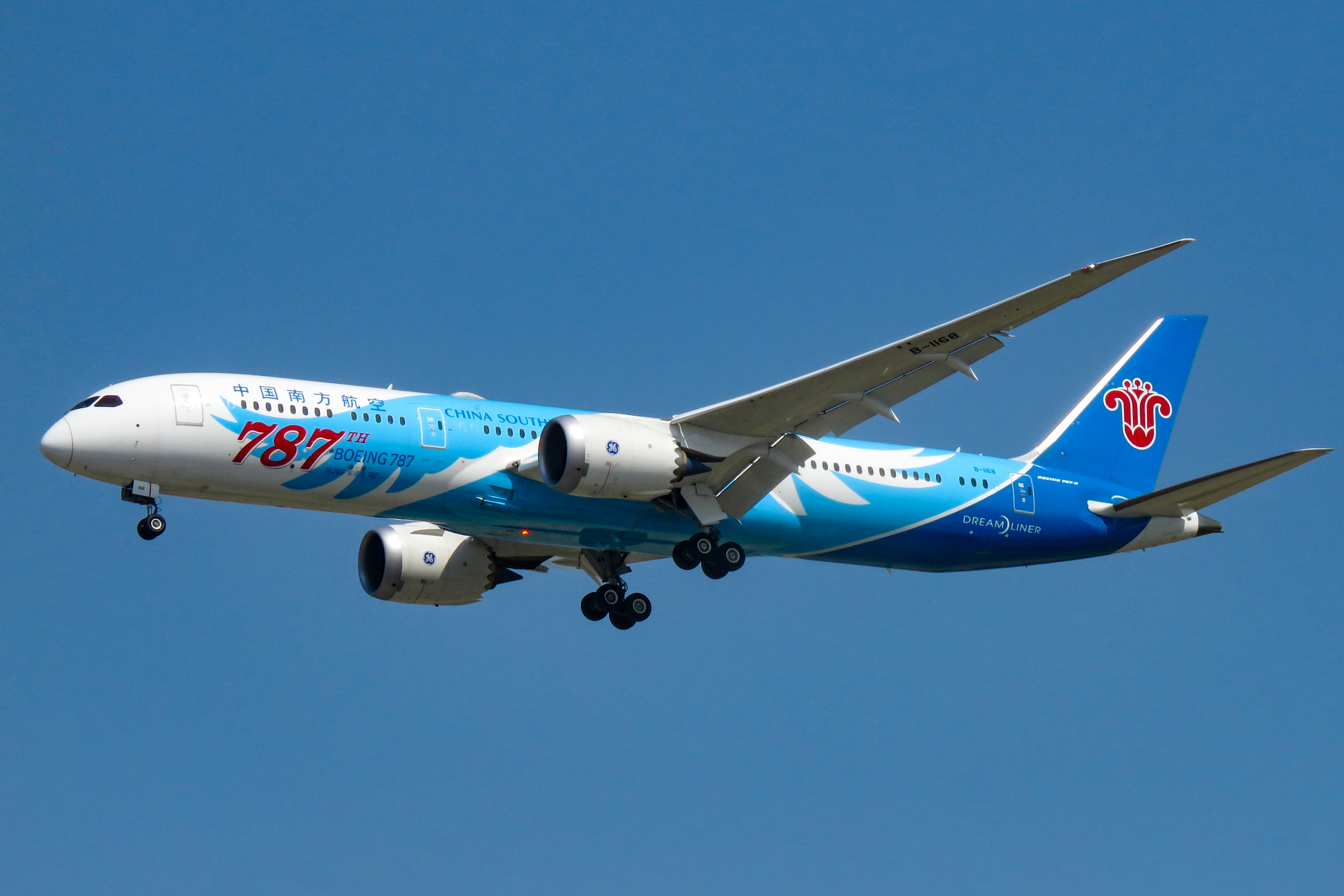
The 787th Boeing 787 produced, a 787-9 operated by China Southern Airlines, with special markings

There are 1,006 Boeing 787 aircraft in airline service as of February 2022, with outstanding orders for further 481 aircraft. As of August 2019, the largest operators are All Nippon Airways (77), United Airlines (63), Japan Airlines (47), and American Airlines (46).

=== Orders and deliveries ===
In September 2011, the 787 was first officially delivered to launch customer All Nippon Airways. As of December 2018, the top five identified 787 customers are American Airlines with 89 orders (37 -8s and 52 -9s), All Nippon Airways with 83 orders (36 -8s, 44 -9s and three -10s), ILFC (an aircraft leasing company) with 74 orders (23 -8s and 51 -9s), and United Airlines (12 -8s, 38 -9s and 21 -10s) and Etihad Airways (41 -9s and 30 -10s), both with 71 orders.

On December 13, 2018, the 787th Boeing 787 was delivered to AerCap and leased to China Southern Airlines. By then the 787 had flown 300 million passengers on 1.5 million flights and opened 210 new nonstop routes. The 1000th Dreamliner, a 787-10 for Singapore Airlines, made its maiden flight on April 3, 2020.

Boeing 787 orders and deliveries by type
	Total orders	Total deliveries	Unfilled
787‑8	424	400	24
787‑9	1,493	777	716
787‑10	587	145	442
Total	2,504	1,322	1,182

Boeing 787 net orders and deliveries by year
		2004	2005	2006	2007	2008	2009	2010	2011	2012	2013	2014	2015	2016	2017	2018	2019	2020
Net orders		56	235	157	369	93	−59	−4	13	−12	182	41	71	58	94	109	82	20
Deliveries	787‑8	–	–	–	–	–	–	–	3	46	65	104	71	35	26	10	10	5
Deliveries	787‑9	–	–	–	–	–	–	–	–	–	–	10	64	102	110	120	114	36
Deliveries	787‑10	–	–	–	–	–	–	–	–	–	–	–	–	–	–	15	34	12
Deliveries	Total	–	–	–	–	–	–	–	3	46	65	114	135	137	136	145	158	53

		2021	2022	2023	2024	2025	2026	Total
Net orders		−11	114	301	48	368	179	2,504
Deliveries	787‑8	2	9	10	1	2	1	400
Deliveries	787‑9	12	10	40	29	67	63	777
Deliveries	787‑10	–	12	23	21	19	9	145
Deliveries	Total	14	31	73	51	88	73	1,322

Boeing 787 orders and deliveries (cumulative, by year):

Orders Deliveries — as of October 2026

== Accidents and incidents ==
The Boeing 787 has been involved in eight accidents and incidents as of June 2025, including one hull loss, which was also the only accident involving fatalities.

=== Fatal and hull loss accidents ===
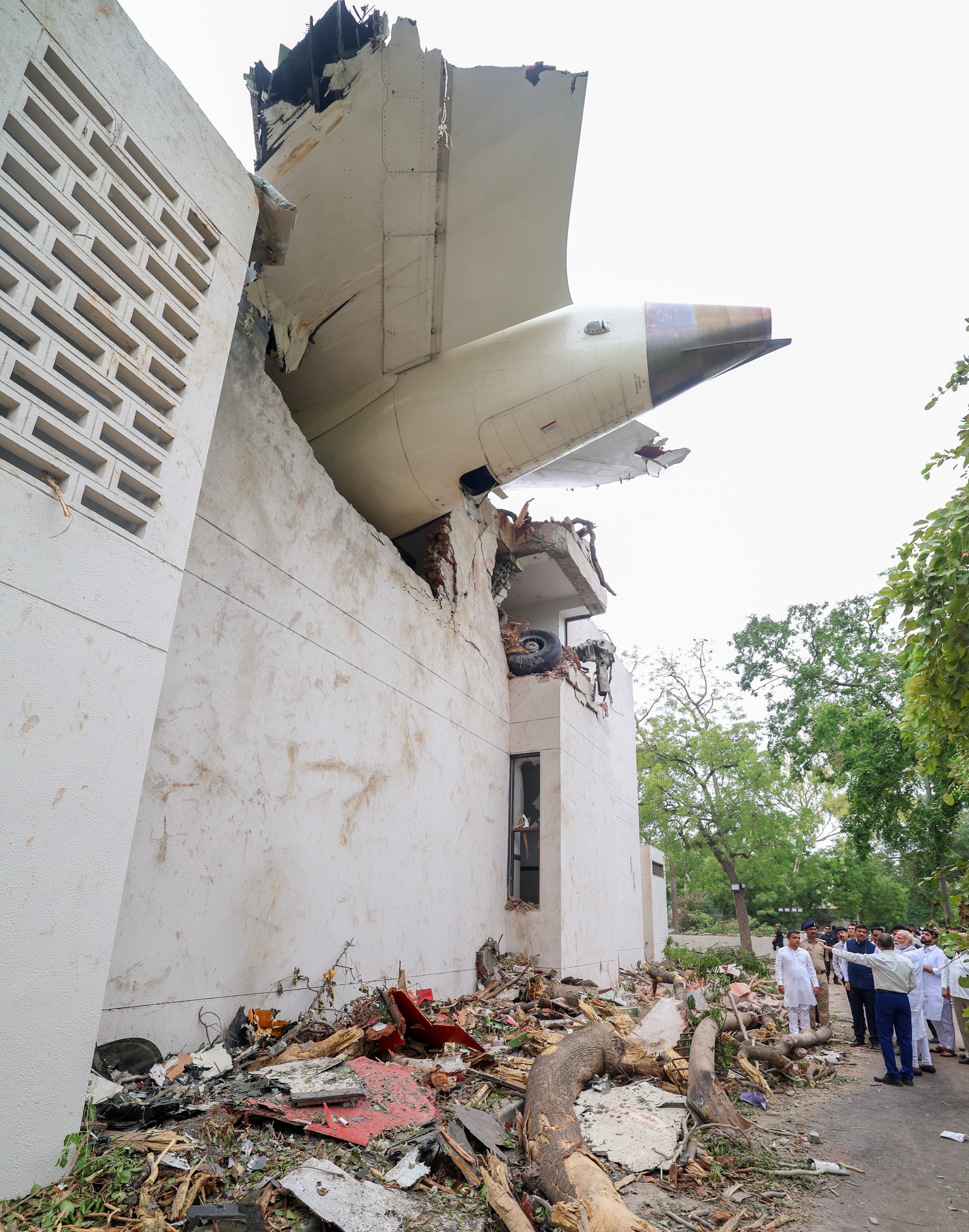
Wreckage of Air India Flight 171 tail section, which crashed on June 12, 2025, in Ahmedabad

- On June 12, 2025, Air India Flight 171, an 11-year-old Boeing 787-8 registered as VT-ANB operating from Ahmedabad Airport to London Gatwick Airport, crashed into the hostel building of B. J. Medical College shortly after takeoff. According to the preliminary Aircraft Accident Investigation Bureau report released on July 8, 2025, the crash was caused by both engines shutting down after their fuel control switches moved from the "RUN" to "CUTOFF" position. The cause of the switch movement remains under investigation. The report did not recommend any actions to Boeing, or 787 operators. All but one of the 242 people on board were killed, as well as 19 people on the ground. The sole survivor was a passenger seated in 11A, next to an emergency exit. This marked the first fatal crash and hull loss of a 787.

=== Other accidents and incidents ===
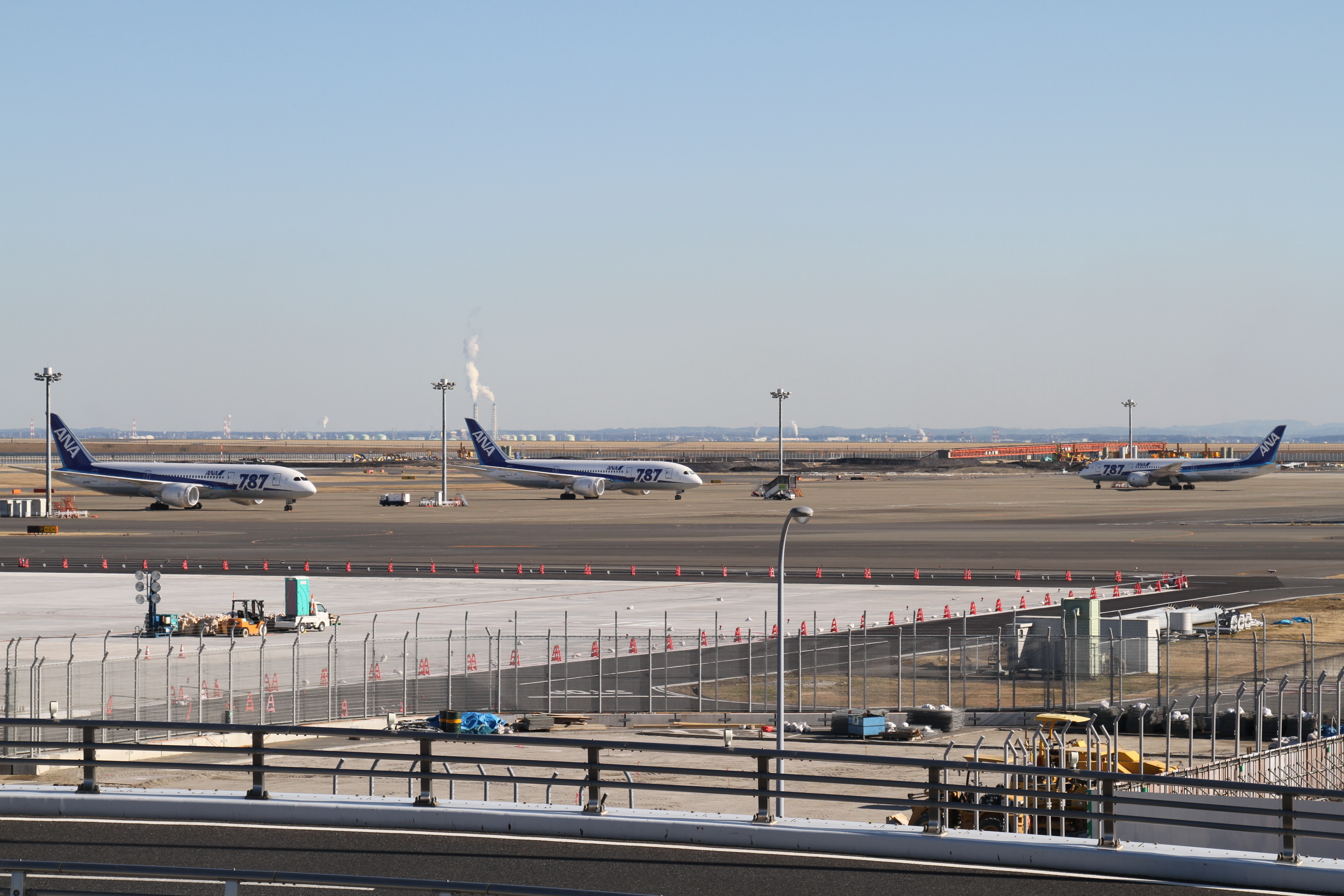
Three 787s of All Nippon Airways sit grounded at Tokyo Haneda International Airport in late January 2013.

On July 12, 2013, a fire started on an empty Ethiopian Airlines 787 parked at Heathrow Airport before it was extinguished by the airport fire and rescue service. No injuries were reported. The fire caused extensive heat damage to the aircraft. The FAA and NTSB sent representatives to assist in the investigation. The initial investigation found no direct link with the aircraft's main batteries. Further investigations indicated that the fire was due to lithium-manganese dioxide batteries powering an emergency locator transmitter (ELT). The UK Air Accidents Investigation Branch (AAIB) issued a special bulletin on July 18, 2013, requesting the US FAA ensure that the locator is removed or disconnected in Boeing 787s and to review the safety of lithium battery-powered ELT systems in other aircraft types. On August 19, 2015, the Associated Press reported that the fire was started by a short circuit caused by crossed wires located under the battery. The Air Accidents Investigation Branch's investigators recommended that "the US Federal Aviation Administration, together with similar bodies in Europe and Canada, should conduct a review of equipment powered by lithium metal batteries to ensure they have 'an acceptable level of circuit protection.'"

In March 2016, the FAA accelerated the release of an airworthiness directive in response to reports indicating that in certain weather conditions "erroneous low airspeed may be displayed..." There was concern "abrupt pilot control inputs in this condition could exceed the structural capability of the airplane." Pilots were told not to apply "large, abrupt control column inputs" in the event of an "unrealistic" drop in displayed airspeed.

On April 22, 2016, the FAA issued an airworthiness directive following a January 29, 2016, incident in which a General Electric GEnx-1B PIP2 engine suffered damage and non-restartable power loss while flying at an altitude of 20,000 feet. The damage is thought to have been caused by a fan imbalance resulting from fan ice shedding.

=== Lithium-ion battery problems ===
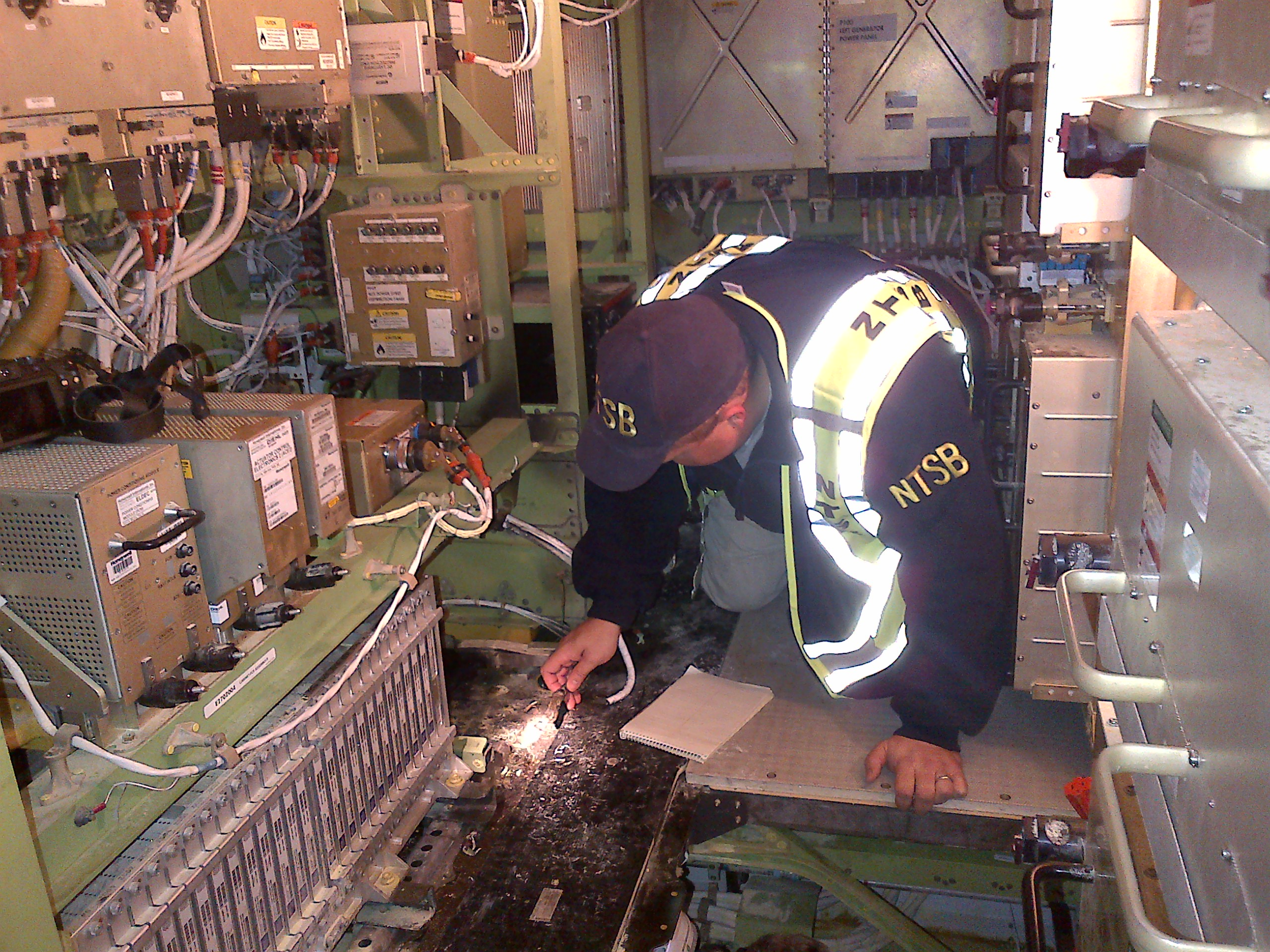
The aft electronics bay which held the JAL 787 battery that caught fire

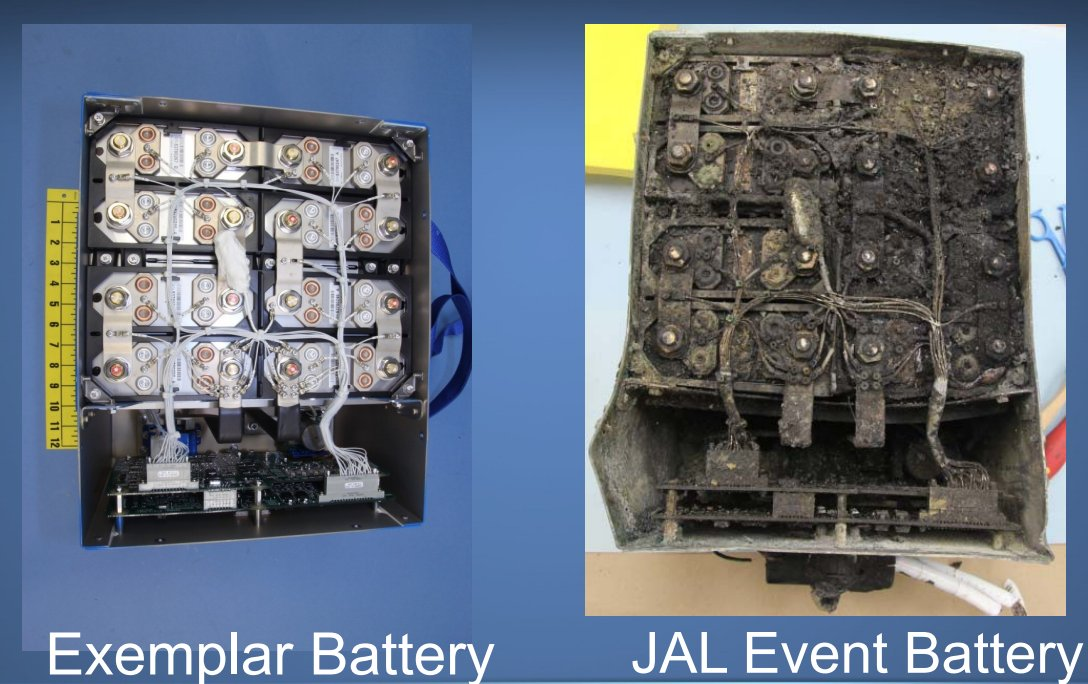
Japan Airlines 787 battery comparison; Left: typical original battery. Right: damaged battery.

On January 16, 2013, All Nippon Airways Flight 692, en route from Yamaguchi Ube Airport to Tokyo Haneda, had a battery problem warning followed by a burning smell while climbing from Ube about 35 nautical miles (65 km; 40 mi) west of Takamatsu, Japan. The aircraft diverted to Takamatsu and was evacuated via the slides; three passengers received minor injuries during the evacuation. Inspection revealed a battery fire. A similar incident in a parked Japan Airlines 787 at Boston's Logan International Airport within the same week led the Federal Aviation Administration to ground all 787s. On January 16, 2013, both major Japanese airlines ANA and JAL voluntarily grounded their fleets of 787s after multiple incidents involving different 787s, including emergency landings. At the time, these two carriers operated 24 of the 50 787s delivered. The grounding reportedly cost ANA some 9 billion yen (US$93 million) in lost sales.

On January 16, 2013, the FAA issued an emergency airworthiness directive ordering all American-based airlines to ground their Boeing 787s until yet-to-be-determined modifications were made to the electrical system to reduce the risk of the battery overheating or catching fire. This was the first time that the FAA had grounded an airliner type since 1979. Industry experts disagreed on consequences of the grounding: Airbus was confident that Boeing would resolve the issue and that no airlines will switch plane type, while other experts saw the problem as "costly" and "could take upwards of a year".

The FAA also conducted an extensive review of the 787's critical systems. The focus of the review was on the safety of the lithium-ion batteries made of lithium cobalt oxide (LiCoO_{2}). The 787 battery contract was signed in 2005, when this was the only type of lithium aerospace battery available, but since then newer and safer types (such as LiFePO_{4}), which provide less reaction energy with virtually no cobalt content to avoid cobalt's thermal runaway characteristic, have become available. FAA approved a 787 battery in 2007 with nine "special conditions". A battery approved by FAA (through Mobile Power Solutions) was made by Rose Electronics using Kokam cells; the batteries installed in the 787 are made by Yuasa.

The first big hurdle for Boeing was that the ranks of commercial aircraft engineers lacked lithium-ion battery expertise in that lithium-ion batteries had never before been used on a Boeing commercial jet. Boeing chief technology officer John Tracy began canvassing the entire organization for lithium-ion battery experts. He also began calling his contacts outside the aerospace industry. Within a day, about a dozen Boeing engineers from across the United States assembled at Boeing's Everett, Washington engineering center. The collaborators began ongoing collaborative group sessions—not just a series of meetings—that lasted weeks with breaks only for meals and sleep. Evan Rosen writes in The Culture of Collaboration (2024, expanded and updated edition) that for the Boeing 787 battery effort, hierarchy was out the window, because the collaborators were working outside of their usual reporting structure. There was no chain of command. Hidden agendas and internal competition were gone, because everybody had the same goal, Rosen writes.

On January 20, the NTSB declared that overvoltage was not the cause of the Boston incident, as voltage did not exceed the battery limit of 32 V, and the charging unit passed tests. The battery had signs of short circuiting and thermal runaway. Despite this, by January 24, the NTSB had not yet pinpointed the cause of the Boston fire; the FAA would not allow US-based 787s to fly again until the problem was found and corrected. In a press briefing that day, NTSB Chairwoman Deborah Hersman said that the NTSB had found evidence of failure of multiple safety systems designed to prevent these battery problems, and stated that fire must never happen on an airplane.

The Japan Transport Safety Board (JTSB) said on January 23 that the battery in ANA jets in Japan reached a maximum voltage of 31 V (below the 32 V limit like the Boston JAL 787), but had a sudden unexplained voltage drop to near zero. All cells had signs of thermal damage prior to runaway. ANA and JAL had replaced several 787 batteries before the mishaps. As of January 29, 2013, JTSB approved the Yuasa factory quality control while the NTSB examined the Boston battery for defects. The failure rate, with two major battery thermal runaway events in 100,000 flight hours, was much higher than the rate of one in 10 million flight hours predicted by Boeing.

The only American airline that operated the Dreamliner at the time was United Airlines, which had six. Chile's Directorate General of Civil Aviation (DGAC) grounded LAN Airlines' three 787s. The Indian Directorate General of Civil Aviation (DGCA) directed Air India to ground its six Dreamliners. The Japanese Transport Ministry made the ANA and JAL groundings official and indefinite following the FAA announcement. The European Aviation Safety Agency also followed the FAA's advice and grounded the only two European 787s operated by LOT Polish Airlines. Qatar Airways grounded their five Dreamliners. Ethiopian Airlines was the final operator to temporarily ground its four Dreamliners. By January 17, 2013, all 50 of the aircraft delivered to date had been grounded. On January 18, Boeing halted 787 deliveries until the battery problem was resolved.

On February 7, 2013, the FAA gave approval for Boeing to conduct 787 test flights to gather additional data. In February 2013, FAA oversight of the 787's 2007 safety approval and certification was under scrutiny. On March 7, 2013, the NTSB released an interim factual report about the Boston battery fire on January 7, 2013. The investigation stated that "heavy smoke and fire coming from the front of the APU battery case." Firefighters "tried fire extinguishing, but smoke and flame (flame size about 3 inches, or 7.6 cm) did not stop".

Boeing completed its final tests on a revised battery design on April 5, 2013. The FAA approved Boeing's revised battery design with three additional, overlapping protection methods on April 19, 2013. The FAA published a directive on April 25 to provide instructions for retrofitting battery hardware before the 787s could return to flight. The repairs were expected to be completed in weeks. Following the FAA approval in the US effective April 26, Japan approved resumption of Boeing 787 flights in the country on April 26, 2013. On April 27, 2013, Ethiopian Airlines took a 787 on the model's first commercial flight after battery system modifications.

On January 14, 2014, a battery in a JAL 787 emitted smoke from the battery's protection exhaust while the aircraft was undergoing pre-flight maintenance at Tokyo Narita Airport. The battery partially melted in the incident; one of its eight lithium-ion cells had its relief port vent and fluid sprayed inside the battery's container. It was later reported that the battery may have reached a temperature as high as 1,220 °F (660 °C), and that Boeing did not understand the root cause of the failure.

The NTSB criticized the FAA, Boeing, and battery manufacturers for the faults in a 2014 report. It also criticized the GE-made flight data and cockpit voice recorder in the same report. The enclosure Boeing added is 185 lb (84 kg) heavier, negating the lighter battery potential.

== Aircraft on display ==
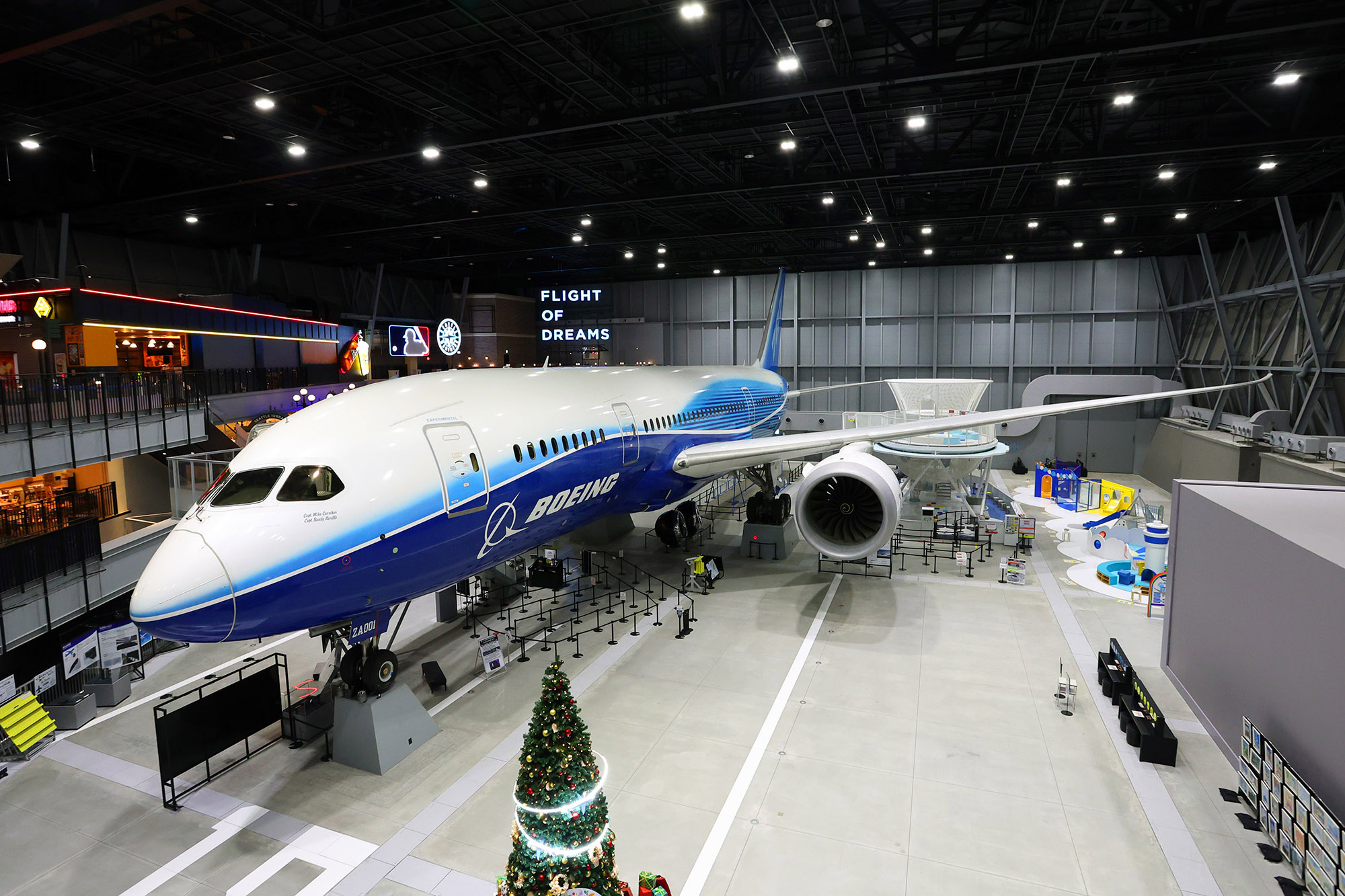
N787BA, the first prototype aircraft, on display in the "Flight of Dreams" building at Chubu Centrair Airport, Nagoya

All three prototype 787-8s are preserved in museums.

- N787BA (ZA001) – Chubu Centrair Airport in Nagoya, Japan—first prototype aircraft
- N787EX (ZA002) – Pima Air & Space Museum in Tucson, Arizona, United States—second prototype aircraft
- N787BX (ZA003) – Museum of Flight in Seattle, Washington, United States—third prototype aircraft

== Specifications (787-9 iMTOW with GEnx-1B engines) ==
Data from

General characteristics

- Crew: 2
- Capacity: 406 passengers, 6,090 cu ft (172.4 m3) of cargo (including 36 LD3 containers)
- Length: 206 ft 1 in (62.81 m)
- Wingspan: 197 ft 3 in (60.12 m)
- Width: 18 ft 11 in (5.77 m) (fuselage)
- Height: 56 ft 1 in (17.09 m)
- Max takeoff weight: 571,500 lb (259,228 kg)
- Fuel capacity: 33,399 US Gal (126,429 L) (223,773 lb (101,522 kg) by weight) usable fuel
- Powerplant: 2 × General Electric GEnx-1B high-bypass turbofan engines, 71,000 lbf (320 kN) thrust each

Performance

- Maximum speed: Mach 0.90
- Range: 9,550 mi (15,370 km, 8,300 nmi)
- Service ceiling: 43,100 ft (13,100 m)
- Takeoff distance: 9,300 ft (2,800 m)

== See also ==
- Competition between Airbus and Boeing

Related development

- Boeing Business Jet
- Boeing Sonic Cruiser
- Boeing 747-8
- Boeing 777X

Aircraft of comparable role, configuration, and era

- Airbus A330neo
- Airbus A350
- Comac C929

Related lists

- List of jet airliners

== Bibliography ==
- Norris, Guy; Wagner, Mark (2009). Boeing 787 Dreamliner. Minneapolis, Minn.: Zenith Press. ISBN 978-0-7603-2815-6.
- Thisdell, Dan; Seymour, Chris (August 5, 2019). "World Airliner Census". Flight International. Vol. 196, no. 5697. pp. 24–47. ISSN 0015-3710.
- Rosen, Evan (2024). The Culture of Collaboration: Deserializing Time, Talent and Tools to Create Value in the Local and Global Economy. San Francisco, CA.: Red Ape Publishing. ISBN 978-0-9774617-9-0.
