= Deaths in April 2023 =

The following is a list of notable deaths in April 2023.

Entries for each day are listed alphabetically by surname. A typical entry lists information in the following sequence:

- Name, age, country of citizenship at birth, subsequent country of citizenship (if applicable), reason for notability, cause of death (if known), and reference.

== April 2023 ==
=== 1 ===
- Leonard Abrams, 68, American journalist (East Village Eye), heart attack.
- Lúcio Ignácio Baumgaertner, 91, Brazilian Roman Catholic prelate, bishop of Toledo (1983–1995) and archbishop of Cascavel (1995–2007).
- Kwame Brathwaite, 85, American photojournalist and activist.
- Ken Buchanan, 77, Scottish boxer, undisputed world lightweight champion (1971), complications from dementia.
- Christopher Budd, 85, British Roman Catholic prelate, bishop of Plymouth (1986–2013), cancer.
- Dario Campeotto, 84, Danish singer (Eurovision Song Contest 1961), actor (Peters baby, Han, hun, Dirch og Dario), and entertainer, cancer.
- Hans Ettmayer, 76, Austrian football player (Wacker Innsbruck, VfB Stuttgart, national team) and manager.
- Ken Girard, 86, Canadian ice hockey player (Toronto Maple Leafs).
- Amarasiri Kalansuriya, 82, Sri Lankan actor (Hanthane Kathawa, Akkara Paha, Bambaru Avith).
- Yasumichi Kushida, 46, Japanese voice actor (The Aquatope on White Sand, Demon Prince Enma, Planetarian: The Reverie of a Little Planet).
- Michael Lipton, 86, British economist.
- Luo Zhijun, 71, Chinese politician, chairman of the agriculture and rural affairs committee (since 2019), governor of Jiangsu (2008–2010) and mayor of Nanjing (2001–2003).
- Fay Miller, 75, Australian politician, Northern Territory MLA (2003–2008), primary myelofibrosis.
- Albert Ndele, 92, Congolese economist and politician, chairman of the board of commissioners-general (1960) and minister of finance (1970).
- Swarna Ram, 83, Indian politician, Punjab MLA (1997–2002, 2007–2012).
- Red Robinson, 86, Canadian disc jockey.
- John Sainty, 77, English footballer (Tottenham Hotspur, AFC Bournemouth) and manager (Chester City).
- Włodzimierz Schmidt, 79, Polish chess grandmaster.
- Moshe Shaul, 93, Turkish-born Israeli journalist and researcher.
- Alicia Shepard, 69, American journalist and writer, complications from lung cancer.
- Klaus Teuber, 70, German board game designer (Catan, Drunter und Drüber, Hoity Toity).
- Trần Quang Khôi, 93, Vietnamese military officer.
- Roger Vinson, 83, American jurist, judge (since 1983) and chief judge (1997–2004) of the U.S. District Court for Northern Florida, prostate cancer.

=== 2 ===
- Jean Argles, 97, British World War II cryptographer.
- Gilbert Bailliu, 86, Belgian footballer (Cercle Brugge, Club Brugge).
- José Jovêncio Balestieri, 83, Brazilian Roman Catholic prelate, bishop of Humaitá (1991–1998), coadjutor bishop (1998–2000) and bishop (2000–2008) of Rio do Sul.
- Bushwhacker Butch, 78, New Zealand Hall of Fame professional wrestler (WWF, WWC, PNW).
- Rochelle Chronister, 83, American politician, member of the Kansas House of Representatives (1979–1995).
- Max Crabtree, 90, English professional wrestler and promoter (Joint Promotions).
- Salim Durani, 88, Afghan-born Indian cricketer (Gujarat, Rajasthan, India national team), cancer.
- Toni Elling, 94, American burlesque dancer.
- Judy Farrell, 84, American actress (M*A*S*H, Fame) and television writer (Port Charles), complications from a stroke.
- Gail D. Fosler, 75, American businesswoman.
- Greg Francis, 48, Canadian Olympic basketball player (2000).
- Wolfgang Gerz, 70, German Olympic sailor (1984).
- Frank Gilliam, 89, American football player (Iowa Hawkeyes, Winnipeg Blue Bombers).
- Evert Gummesson, 87, Swedish marketing and management professor.
- Stefán Arnar Gunnarsson, 45, Icelandic handball player and coach. (body discovered on this date)
- Aram Karam, 93, Iraqi footballer (national team).
- Haziqul Khairi, 91, Pakistani jurist, chief justice of the Federal Shariat Court (2006–2009).
- Pedro Lavirgen, 92, Spanish tenor.
- Hans Edvard Nørregård-Nielsen, 78, Danish art historian.
- Raúl Padilla López, 68, Mexican academic, rector of the University of Guadalajara (1989–1995), suicide by gunshot.
- William Persson, 95, British Anglican prelate, bishop of Doncaster (1982–1992).
- Luigi Raffin, 86, Italian football player (Biellese, Venezia, Brescia) and manager.
- Norman Reynolds, 89, British production designer (Star Wars, Raiders of the Lost Ark, Empire of the Sun), Oscar winner (1978, 1982).
- Michael Saywell, 80, British Olympic equestrian (1972).
- Seymour Stein, 80, American Hall of Fame music executive, co-founder of Sire Records, cancer.
- Garn Stephens, 78, American actress (Phyllis, Halloween III: Season of the Witch, The Sunshine Boys).
- Vladlen Tatarsky, 40, Russian blogger, explosion.
- Igor Vysotsky, 69, Russian boxer.
- Ian Watson, 88, Canadian politician, MP (1963–1984).

=== 3 ===
- William M. Barker, 81, American jurist, chief justice of the Tennessee Supreme Court (1995–2009).
- Nigel Lawson, Baron Lawson of Blaby, 91, British politician, chancellor of the Exchequer (1983–1989), MP (1974–1992) and member of the House of Lords (1992–2022), bronchopneumonia.
- Neal Boenzi, 97, American photographer.
- Mario Božić, 39, Bosnian footballer (Slovan Bratislava, Videoton Fehérvár, national team).
- Nico Cirasola, 71, Italian film director, screenwriter and actor (The Wholly Family).
- Tom Dimmick, 91, American football player (Philadelphia Eagles, Hamilton Tiger-Cats).
- David Finfer, 80, American film editor (The Fugitive, Bill & Ted's Bogus Journey, The Santa Clause 3: The Escape Clause), complications from a heart attack.
- Heklina, 55, American drag queen and actor.
- Rena Koumioti, 81, Greek new wave singer.
- Jane LaTour, 76, American labor activist and journalist, lung cancer.
- Roy McGrath, 53, American public official and fugitive, chief of staff to the governor of Maryland (2020), shot.
- Enrique Mendoza, 77, Venezuelan politician, governor of Miranda (1995–2004) and mayor of Sucre Municipality (1989–1995), leukemia.
- Wallace Mgoqi, 73, South African lawyer and activist.
- Kristaq Mitro, 77, Albanian film director.
- T. B. Radhakrishnan, 63, Indian jurist, judge of the Kerala High Court (2004–2017), chief justice of Calcutta High Court (2019–2021) and Chhattisgarh High Court (2017–2018).
- Michael Roberts, 75, British fashion journalist.
- Gershon Rorich, 49, South African Olympic volleyball player (2004), cancer.
- Herb Rule, 87, American politician, member of the Arkansas House of Representatives.
- Konstantinos Staikos, 80, Greek architect and historian.
- Tu Tongjin, 108, Chinese military officer and neurosurgeon, president of the Academy of Military Medical Sciences (1977–1983).
- Jack Vreeswijk, 59, Swedish singer and composer (Cornelis), colon cancer.
- Neeraj Yadav, Indian politician, Bihar MLA (2015–2020), heart attack.
- Galarrwuy Yunupingu, 74, Australian indigenous land rights activist.
- Marjorie Ziff, 93, British philanthropist.

=== 4 ===
- Rockstar Ramani Ammal, 69, Indian playback singer (Kathavarayan, Haridas, Nenjamundu Nermaiyundu Odu Raja).
- David Bartholomae, 75, American scholar, head and neck cancer.
- Bokito, 27, German-born Dutch western gorilla, heart failure.
- Ethan Boyes, 44, American track cyclist, traffic collision.
- Craig Breedlove, 86, American racecar driver, cancer.
- Suneet Chopra, 81, Indian trade unionist.
- Cui Naifu, 94, Chinese politician, minister of civil affairs (1982–1993).
- R. H. W. Dillard, 85, American poet, author and critic.
- Andrés García, 81, Dominican-Mexican actor (Tú o nadie, The Bermuda Triangle, Manaos).
- Wellborn Jack Jr., 86, American attorney.
- Birger Jensen, 72, Danish footballer (Club Brugge, national team).
- Bob Lee, 43, American tech executive, founder of Cash App, stabbed.
- Marian Marzyński, 85, Polish-American documentary filmmaker.
- Tea Petrin, 78, Slovenian economist, politician, and diplomat, minister of economic affairs (2000–2004), ambassador to the Netherlands (2004–2008).
- Maria Sebaldt, 92, German actress (Ich heirate eine Familie, Die Wicherts von nebenan, The Story of Anastasia).
- Vivian Trimble, 59, American musician (Luscious Jackson, Dusty Trails, Kostars), cancer.
- Billy Waugh, 93, American Special Forces army soldier.

=== 5 ===
- Albert Edward Baharagate Akiiki, 93, Ugandan Roman Catholic prelate, bishop of Hoima (1969–1991).
- Malika El Aroud, 64, Belgian-Moroccan jihadist.
- Harrison Bankhead, 68, American jazz double bassist.
- Lowell S. Brown, 89, American theoretical physicist.
- Bill Butler, 101, American cinematographer (Jaws, One Flew Over the Cuckoo's Nest, Grease).
- Daylami, 28, Irish-bred French Thoroughbred racehorse, winner of the Breeders' Cup Turf (1999), Cartier Horse of the Year (1999).
- Nancy Detert, 78, American politician, member of the Florida Senate (2008–2016) and House of Representatives (1998–2006).
- Jan Dorrestein, 77, Dutch golfer.
- Paul Dundas, 71, British Indologist.
- Anne Agius Ferrante, 97, Maltese politician, MP (1980–1981).
- Bernard Ford, 75, English Olympic ice dancer (1968).
- Duško Gojković, 91, Serbian jazz trumpeter, composer, and arranger.
- Sergio Gori, 77, Italian footballer (Inter, Cagliari, Juventus).
- Masanori Hata, 87, Japanese zoologist, essayist and film director (The Adventures of Milo and Otis).
- Cedric Henderson, 57, American basketball player (Atlanta Hawks, Albany Patroons, Olympique Antibes).
- Ismail Mahmud Hurre, 80, Somali politician, minister of foreign affairs (2000–2002, 2006–2007).
- Leon Levine, 85, American businessman, founder of Family Dollar.
- Bennett L. Lewis, 96, American Army lieutenant general.
- Ian McIntosh, 84, Zimbabwean rugby union coach (Natal, South Africa national team, Zimbabwe national team), cancer.
- Ross Murray, 89, New Zealand amateur golfer.
- Khalid Naciri, 77, Moroccan politician, minister of communications (2007–2012).
- Sudhir Naik, 78, Indian cricketer (Mumbai, national team).
- Booker Newberry III, 67, American singer ("Love Town") and keyboardist.
- Martin Polden, 94, English solicitor.
- Kiumars Pourahmad, 73, Iranian film director (Strange Sisters, The Night Bus, Blade and Termeh), screenwriter, and producer, suicide by hanging.
- Rokia Afzal Rahman, 82, Bangladeshi women's rights activist.
- Alan Ramsbottom, 86, English racing cyclist.
- Hugo Rodríguez Chinchilla, 47, Guatemalan politician, deputy (since 2020), pneumonia.

=== 6 ===
- Jim Caldwell, 80, American basketball player (New York Knicks), heart condition.
- Paul Cattermole, 46, English singer (S Club 7).
- Rawle Douglin, 90, Trinidadian Anglican clergyman, bishop of Trinidad and Tobago (1993–2001).
- Juanjo Ferreiro Suárez, 79, Spanish union leader and politician, member of the Parliament of Catalonia (1980–1984) and City Council of Barcelona (1983–1995).
- Nora Forster, 80, German music promoter (The Slits, Sex Pistols, The Clash), complications from Alzheimer's disease.
- Bill Hellmuth, 69, American architect, chairman of HOK (since 2005).
- Nicola Heywood-Thomas, 67, Welsh broadcaster and journalist (BBC Radio Wales, HTV).
- Ingvar Hirdwall, 88, Swedish actor (Beck, The Girl with the Dragon Tattoo, Children's Island), suicide.
- Ewan Hooper, 87, Scottish actor (Dracula Has Risen from the Grave, Hi-de-Hi!, The Avengers).
- Hobie Landrith, 93, American baseball player (New York Mets, Cincinnati Reds, San Francisco Giants).
- Jagarnath Mahto, 56, Indian politician, Jharkhand MLA (since 2014), complications from lung transplant.
- Jim McKeever, 92, Northern Irish Gaelic footballer (Derry, Ballymaguigan, Newbridge).
- Nei Paulo Moretto, 86, Brazilian Roman Catholic prelate, bishop of Cruz Alta (1973–1976), coadjutor bishop (1976–1983) and bishop (1983–2011) of Caxias do Sul.
- Kent C. Nelson, 85, American businessman, CEO of United Parcel Service (1989–1996), complications from COVID-19.
- Bruce Petty, 93, Australian cartoonist and animator (Leisure).
- Josep Piqué, 68, Spanish businessman and politician, minister of foreign affairs (2000–2002) and twice of industry, chairman of Vueling (2007–2013), cancer.
- Mimi Sheraton, 97, American food critic (The New York Times, The Daily Beast).
- Volodymyr Stretovych, 64, Ukrainian politician, MP (1994–1998, 2002–2012), traffic collision.
- Taeko Tomioka, 87, Japanese writer.
- Howard E. Wasdin, 61, American naval sailor and author, plane crash.

=== 7 ===
- Pam Alexander, 68, British businesswoman, ovarian cancer.
- Ian Bairnson, 69, Scottish musician (The Alan Parsons Project, Pilot, Kate Bush).
- Larisa Bergen, 73, Kazakh volleyball player, Olympic silver medallist (1976).
- Hannelore Bollmann, 97, German film actress (The Congress Dances, The Happy Village, Emperor's Ball).
- Philippe Bouvatier, 58, French Olympic cyclist (1984), complications from a stroke.
- Hans Capel, 86, Dutch theoretical physicist.
- Kalamandalam Devaki, 76, Indian Ottan Thullal dancer.
- Ben Ferencz, 103, Hungarian-American lawyer (Einsatzgruppen trial).
- Carl Fischer, 98, American art director and photographer.
- Susan Frykberg, 68, New Zealand electroacoustic composer.
- Prabir Ghosh, 78, Indian writer and skeptic, founder of the Science and Rationalists' Association of India.
- Billy Hahn, 69, American basketball coach (Ohio Bobcats, La Salle Explorers, West Virginia Mountaineers).
- Bruce Haigh, 77, Australian diplomat and political commentator, cancer.
- Tracy Johnson, 56, American football player (Houston Oilers, Atlanta Falcons, Seattle Seahawks), cancer.
- Kidd Jordan, 87, American jazz saxophonist.
- William Myles Knighton, 91, British civil servant.
- Elisabeth Kopp, 86, Swiss politician, member of the Federal Council and minister of justice and police (1984–1989).
- Harry Lorayne, 96, American magician.
- Peter Hugoe Matthews, 89, British linguist and historian.
- Steve H. Murdock, 74, American sociologist, director of the United States Census Bureau (2008–2009).
- Elizabeth Murray, 63, British medical practitioner and academic, breast cancer.
- Jim Pines, 77, American-British film historian, author, and filmmaker. (death announced on this date)
- Rachel Pollack, 77, American author (Unquenchable Fire) and comic book writer (Doom Patrol, New Gods), Hodgkin lymphoma.
- John Regan, 71, American bass guitarist (Frehley's Comet).
- Gareth Richards, 43, British comedian and radio host, injuries sustained in a traffic collision.
- Inés Sánchez, 91, Cuban-Costa Rican journalist.
- Charles Scriver, 92, Canadian pediatrician and geneticist.
- Priyani Soysa, 97, Sri Lankan paediatrician.
- Antonio Tarín García, 47, Mexican politician, suicide by jumping.
- James W. Valentine, 96, American evolutionary biologist.
- Lasse Wellander, 70, Swedish guitarist (ABBA).
- Wolfgang Wild, 92, German nuclear physicist and academic administrator, president of the Technical University of Munich (1980–1986).

=== 8 ===
- Bola Ajibola, 89, Nigerian jurist, minister of justice and attorney general (1985–1991), judge of the International Court of Justice (1991–1994).
- Walter Asbil, 90, Canadian Anglican clergyman, bishop of Niagara (1991–1997).
- Matt Baldwin, 96, Canadian curler.
- Deborah Brown, 95, Northern Irish sculptor.
- Dan Callikan, 75, Mauritian politician, political adviser, and author, director general of the Mauritius Broadcasting Corporation (1986–1988, 2009–2014).
- Djene Kaba Condé, 62–63, Guinean socialite, first lady (2010–2021).
- Simon France, 64, New Zealand jurist, judge of the High Court (2005–2022) and Court of Appeal (2022–2023).
- Bob Heatlie, 76, Scottish songwriter ("Japanese Boy", "Cry Just a Little Bit", "Merry Christmas Everyone") and record producer.
- Elizabeth Hubbard, 89, American actress (The Doctors, As the World Turns, Ordinary People), cancer.
- Khalil Hachimi Idrissi, 66, Moroccan journalist, director of the Maghreb Arabe Press (since 2011).
- Michael Lerner, 81, American actor (Barton Fink, Eight Men Out, Elf), complications from brain seizures.
- Frankie Lucas, 69, Vincentian boxer.
- Kenneth McAlpine, 102, English racing driver.
- Rami Meir, 60, Azerbaijani-born Israeli artist, poet, and singer.
- Andreas K. W. Meyer, 64, German dramaturge, playwright and opera manager (Oper Bonn), heart failure.
- Judith Miller, 71, British antiques expert and broadcaster (Antiques Roadshow).
- William Newton-Smith, 79, Canadian philosopher, throat cancer.
- Valérie Oka, 56, Ivorian artist and designer.
- Edward L. Rissien, 98, American production company executive and producer (Snow Job, Saint Jack, Castle Keep).
- Paulo de Tarso Sanseverino, 63, Brazilian judge and academic, magistrate of the Superior Court of Justice (since 2010), cancer.
- Mickey Slaughter, 81, American football player (Denver Broncos).
- Otto Thomas Solbrig, 92, Argentine evolutionary biologist and botanist.
- Norman H. Stahl, 92, American jurist, judge of the U.S. Court of Appeals for the First Circuit (since 1992) and the U.S. District Court for New Hampshire (1990–1992).
- Rebecka Teper, 50, Swedish actress (Solsidan, Morden i Sandhamn, Bonus Family).
- Isi Yanouka, Israeli diplomat, ambassador to Ivory Coast (2013–2016) and Cameroon (since 2016).
- András Zsinka, 75, Hungarian Olympic middle-distance runner (1972).

=== 9 ===
- Baker Abdel Munem, 80, Palestinian diplomat, ambassador to Japan (1983–1995) and Canada (since 1995).
- Dario Acquaroli, 48, Italian mountain bike racer, heart attack.
- Muhammad Rapsel Ali, 51, Indonesian businessman and politician, MP (since 2019), heart attack.
- Jere L. Bacharach, 84, American historian.
- Nicolás Eduardo Becerra, 80, Argentine attorney.
- Karl Berger, 88, German-American jazz pianist, composer, and educator (Creative Music Studio).
- Bruria David, 84, American-Israeli rebbetzin, founder of Beth Jacob Jerusalem.
- Valter Dešpalj, 75, Croatian cellist.
- Alexander J. Dessler, 94, American planetary scientist.
- Donald W. Ernst, 89, American film editor (The Brave Little Toaster, The Lord of the Rings) and producer (Fantasia 2000).
- Ettore Fiorini, 89, Italian physicist.
- Roberto Frigerio, 84, Swiss footballer (Basel, Bellinzona, national team).
- Max Hazelton, 95, Australian aviator and businessman, founder of Hazelton Airlines.
- Paul Hinrichs, 97, American baseball player (Boston Red Sox).
- Claire Lamont, 81, British academic, complications from vascular dementia.
- Anatoly Makagonov, 90, Russian volleyball player (Soviet Union national team) and coach.
- Jaap Murre, 93, Dutch mathematician.
- Richard Ng, 83, Hong Kong actor (The Private Eyes, Winners and Sinners, Beyond the Sunset), cardiac arrest.
- Huub Oosterhuis, 89, Dutch theologian and poet ("Ik sta voor U in leegte en gemis").
- Fred Pancoast, 90, American football coach (Vanderbilt Commodores, Memphis State Tigers, Tampa Spartans).
- Albert Podell, 86, American magazine editor and writer.
- Valda Setterfield, 88, British-born American dancer, pneumonia.
- Dick Springer, 75, American politician, member of the Oregon House of Representatives (1981–1989) and Senate (1989–1995), heart attack.
- Andrew Phillips, Baron Phillips of Sudbury, 84, British solicitor and politician, member of the House of Lords (1998–2015), complications from Alzheimer's disease.
- Holger Sundström, 97, Swedish sailor, Olympic bronze medallist (1964).
- Wladimir Tchertkoff, 87–88, Italian journalist.
- James Timlin, 95, American Roman Catholic prelate, auxiliary bishop (1976–1984) and bishop (1984–2003) of Scranton.
- Jalabala Vaidya, 86, Indian stage actress, respiratory failure.
- Philip Wilcocks, 69, British Royal Navy rear admiral.
- Gayatri Devi Yadav, Indian politician, Bihar MLA (1970–1977, 1980–1995, 2000–2005).
- Hidehiko Yamamoto, 87, Japanese politician, governor of Yamanashi Prefecture (2003–2007), mayor of Kōfu (1991–2002).
- Tom Yurkovich, 87, American Olympic ice hockey player (1964).

=== 10 ===
- Gad Barzilai, 65, Israeli lawyer and political scientist.
- Andrzej Bławdzin, 84, Polish Olympic cyclist (1964, 1968).
- Nimi Briggs, 79, Nigerian academic.
- Jane Davis Doggett, 93, American graphic designer.
- Paul Furlan, 60, Belgian politician, Wallonia MP (1999–2009), cancer.
- Richard Ieyoub, 78, American politician, attorney general of Louisiana (1992–2004).
- Al Jaffee, 102, American cartoonist (Mad, Trump, Humbug), multiple organ failure.
- Pierre Lacotte, 91, French ballet dancer and choreographer, sepsis.
- Frank Lasky, 81, American football player (New York Giants, Montreal Alouettes).
- Pat Magner, 82, Irish politician, senator (1981–1982, 1983–1987, 1993–1997).
- Alphonse Mattia, 75–76, American furniture designer.
- Anne Perry, 84, British author (Thomas Pitt, William Monk) and convicted murderer.
- Fernando Sánchez Dragó, 86, Spanish writer and journalist, heart attack.
- Raymond Sawada, 38, Canadian ice hockey player (Dallas Stars), heart attack.
- Stephen Stiles, 88, Canadian politician, Alberta MLA (1982–1986), complications from multiple system atrophy.
- John Joe Walsh, 82, Irish Gaelic footballer (St Laurence's, St Mary's Rochfortbridge, Kildare).
- Ronald Whyte, 80, American jurist, judge of the U.S. District Court for Northern California (since 1992).
- Rick Wolff, 71, American writer and radio host, brain cancer.

=== 11 ===
- Bob Alligood, 90, American politician.
- George Bobolas, 95, Greek media executive (Mega Channel).
- Zafrullah Chowdhury, 81, Bangladeshi public health activist.
- Joan Clark, 88, Canadian author (The Hand of Robin Squires).
- Isiya Danwasa, Nigerian bandit leader, shot.
- Miguel Escobar, 77, Colombian footballer (Deportivo Cali, Independiente Santa Fe, national team).
- Archibald Hardy, 86, American politician, member of the South Carolina House of Representatives (1979–1983), stroke.
- Alan Herbert, 78, Canadian politician, member of the Vancouver City Council (1996–1999).
- Emlain Kabua, 95, Marshallese artist, first lady (1979–1996) and designer of the national flag.
- Lotti Krekel, 81, German actress (The True Jacob, Willy the Private Detective, Robert and Bertram) and singer.
- Carol Locatell, 82, American actress (Friday the 13th: A New Beginning, Coffy, The Family Stone), cancer.
- Jerry Mander, 86, American activist and author (Four Arguments for the Elimination of Television).
- Chinwoke Mbadinuju, 77, Nigerian politician, governor of Anambra State (1999–2003).
- Jim McManus, 82, British actor (The Treacle People, Trouble in Mind, Harry Potter and the Order of the Phoenix).
- Dana Němcová, 89, Czech psychologist and dissident (Charter 77, Committee for the Defense of the Unjustly Prosecuted).
- John Olsen, 95, Australian visual artist.
- John O'Shaughnessy, 95, British academic.
- Lou Pappan, 92, Greek-born American restaurateur.
- Freddie Scappaticci, 76, Northern Irish PIRA leader. (death announced on this date)
- Meir Shalev, 74, Israeli author and newspaper columnist (Yedioth Ahronoth), cancer.
- Donald Voet, 84, American biochemist.
- Maya Wildevuur, 78, Dutch painter.

=== 12 ===
- Ivo Babuška, 97, Czech-American mathematician (Babuška–Lax–Milgram theorem, Ladyzhenskaya–Babuška–Brezzi condition).
- Eduard Bagirov, 47, Russian writer, radio presenter, and politician, multiple organ failure.
- Carolyn Long Banks, 82, American civil rights activist and politician, member of the Atlanta City Council (1980–1997).
- Uttara Baokar, 79, Indian actress (Ek Din Achanak, Sardari Begum, Samhita).
- James Bradley, 67, American basketball player (Pallacanestro Trieste).
- Ambra Danon, 75, Italian costume designer (La Cage aux Folles), cancer.
- Michael Denneny, 80, American author and editor (And the Band Played On).
- Alan Frost, 80, Australian historian.
- Jacques Gaillot, 87, French Roman Catholic prelate and social activist, bishop of Évreux (1982–1995).
- Louis Gaskin, 56, American convicted murderer, execution by lethal injection.
- Salem Abdul Salem Ghereby, 62, Libyan Guantanamo Bay detainee, complications from amyotrophic lateral sclerosis.
- Michael L. Grieco, 88, American politician, member of the New Hampshire House of Representatives (1976–1978).
- David Hurles, 78, American gay pornography distributor.
- Radoslav Kunzo, 48, Slovak footballer (Inter Bratislava, Kapfenberger SV). (body discovered on this date)
- Tibisay Lucena, 63, Venezuelan civil servant, president of the national electoral council (2006–2020).
- Keshub Mahindra, 99, Indian automotive executive, chairman of Mahindra Group (1963–2012).
- Tamilla Nasirova, 86, Azerbaijiani mathematician.
- Rustem Nureev, 72, Russian scientist and economist.
- Senan Louis O'Donnell, 96, Irish Roman Catholic prelate, bishop of Maiduguri (1993–2003).
- Bryn Parry, 66, British cartoonist and charity worker, co-founder of Help for Heroes, pancreatic cancer.
- Jeffrey Burton Russell, 88–89, American historian and religious studies scholar.
- Jah Shaka, 75, Jamaican dub and reggae sound system operator.
- Yō Takeyama, 76, Japanese screenwriter, septic shock.
- Megan Terry, 90, American playwright (Viet Rock).
- Blair Tindall, 63, American oboist and journalist, heart disease.
- G. I. Williamson, 97, American theologian, pastor, and author.
- Takaaki Yamazaki, 79, Japanese politician, mayor of Kōtō (since 2007).

=== 13 ===
- Rodney Bagley, 88, American engineer, co-inventor of the catalytic converter.
- Mike Baxes, 92, American baseball player (Kansas City Athletics).
- Len Beel, 77, English footballer (Shrewsbury Town, Bath City, Trowbridge Town).
- Craig Breen, 33, Irish rally driver, rally car collision.
- Michael W. Bruford, 59, Welsh molecular ecologist and conservation biologist.
- Willie Callaghan, 56, Scottish footballer (Dunfermline Athletic, Cowdenbeath, Livingston).
- Nanette Cameron, 95, New Zealand interior designer.
- Tibor Debreceni, 76, Hungarian Olympic road racing cyclist (1972).
- Eduardo Heras León, 82, Cuban writer.
- Lorenzo Holzknecht, 38, Italian ski mountaineer, world champion (2010), avalanche.
- Nizar Issaoui, 35, Tunisian footballer (US Monastir), self-immolation.
- Julia Ituma, 18, Italian volleyball player (Igor Gorgonzola Novara, national team), fall.
- Norm Kent, 73, American attorney and gay rights activist, pancreatic cancer.
- Stanko Klinar, 89, Slovenian writer and translator.
- Eberhard W. Kornfeld, 99, Swiss auctioneer, author, and art dealer.
- Larry LeGrande, 83, American baseball player (Memphis Red Sox, Detroit Stars, Kansas City Monarchs).
- Don Leppert, 91, American baseball player (Pittsburgh Pirates, Washington Senators).
- Marilyn McReavy, 78, American Olympic volleyball player (1968).
- Rabey Hasani Nadwi, 93, Indian Islamic scholar, chancellor of Darul Uloom Nadwatul Ulama (since 2000) and president of AIMPLB (since 2002).
- Dame Mary Quant, 93, British fashion designer.
- Josef Schütz, 102, Lithuanian-born German Nazi concentration camp guard (Sachsenhausen).
- Robert C. Smith, 76, American political scientist.
- Helen Thorington, 94, American radio artist and composer, founder of New Radio and Performing Arts.
- Thubten Zopa Rinpoche, 76, Nepali Tibetan Buddhist lama, founder of FPMT, respiratory failure.

=== 14 ===
- Egil Abrahamsen, 100, Norwegian marine engineer.
- Emad Afroogh, 65, Iranian sociologist and politician, MP (2004–2008), cancer.
- Ken Archer, 95, Australian cricketer (Queensland, national team) and broadcaster, heart failure.
- Mark Arneson, 73, American football player (St. Louis Cardinals).
- Juan Avilés Farré, 73, Spanish historian, cancer.
- Irma Blank, 88, German-Italian painter and graphic artist.
- Enore Boscolo, 93, Italian footballer (Triestina, Padova, Udinese).
- Bill Bradbury, 73, American politician, secretary of state of Oregon (1999–2009), member (1985–1995) and president (1993–1994) of the State Senate.
- Voldemar Dundur, 85, Russian Olympic rower (1960).
- Emmanuel Ebiede, 45, Nigerian footballer (SC Heerenveen, Ashdod, national team).
- Sylvie Fanchon, 70, Kenyan-born French contemporary painter.
- Dave Frost, 70, American baseball player (California Angels).
- Shane Gough, 5th Viscount Gough, 81, British hereditary peer, member of the House of Lords (1951–1999).
- George van Heukelom, 73, Dutch politician, member of the provincial executive of Zeeland (2003–2015).
- Hsu Su-yeh, 89, Taiwanese politician, member of the Legislative Yuan (1999–2002).
- Ed Koren, 87, American cartoonist (The New Yorker), lung cancer.
- Peter Lin Jiashan, 88, Chinese Roman Catholic prelate, coadjutor bishop (1997–2010) and archbishop (since 2010) of Fuzhou.
- Joan McCall, 83, American screenwriter, producer and actress (People Toys, Act of Vengeance, Grizzly).
- Luigi Mele, 85, Italian racing cyclist.
- Murray Melvin, 90, English actor (Alfie, Lisztomania, Barry Lyndon).
- Kensei Mizote, 80, Japanese politician, MP (1993–2019), complications from a stroke.
- Lonnie Napier, 82, American politician, member of the Kentucky House of Representatives (1985–2013).
- Abel Posse, 89, Argentine novelist and diplomat, ambassador to Peru (1998–2002) and Spain (2002–2004).
- Luc Sala, 73, Dutch businessman and writer.
- Mark Sheehan, 46, Irish guitarist (The Script) and songwriter ("Breakeven", "Hall of Fame").
- James M. Skibo, 63, American archaeologist.
- Bernadine Strik, 60, Dutch-born Canadian-American horticulturalist, ovarian cancer.
- Marilyn Ruth Take, 95, Canadian Olympic figure skater (1948).
- George Verwer, 84, American evangelist, founder of Operation Mobilisation, sarcoma.
- Bob Vidler, 66, Australian cricketer (New South Wales), motor neuron disease.
- Yorick Wilks, 83, British computer scientist.
- Vanik Zakaryan, 87, Armenian mathematician and chess player.

=== 15 ===
- Atiq Ahmed, 60, Indian politician and gangster, MP (2004–2009) and Uttar Pradesh MLA (1989–2004), shot.
- Khalid Azim, Indian politician and gangster, Uttar Pradesh MLA (2005–2007), shot.
- Peter Badie, 97, American jazz bass player.
- James Credle, 78, American veterans and LGBT rights activist.
- Mario Fratti, 95, Italian playwright.
- Maryellen Goodwin, 58, American politician, member of the Rhode Island Senate (since 1987), colorectal cancer.
- Roger Hambright, 74, American baseball player (New York Yankees).
- Doktor Haze, 66, British circus owner and performer.
- Bob Higgins, 97, American jazz trumpeter and songwriter.
- Marie C. Ingalls, 87, American politician, member of the South Dakota House of Representatives (1987–1992).
- Celedonia Jones, 93, American historian.
- Johannes Karavidopoulos, 86, Greek biblical scholar.
- Heinrich Köberle, 76, German athlete, four-time Paralympic marathon gold medalist.
- Beatrice Marshoff, 65, South African politician, MP (1994–1999) and premier of the Free State (2004–2009).
- Harold Mockford, 91, English artist.
- Lynda Myles, 83, American television writer (Santa Barbara, Loving, As the World Turns), actress and playwright.
- Hugh Paul Nuckolls, 81, American politician.
- Abdul Shakoor, 55, Pakistani politician, minister for religious affairs and inter-faith harmony (since 2022) and MP (since 2018), traffic collision.
- Bill Thomas, 91, American college basketball coach (Missouri State Bears).
- Faith Thomas, 90, Australian cricketer (South Australia, national team).
- Kanithi Viswanatham, 90, Indian politician, MP (1989–1996).
- Francisco Viti, 89, Angolan Roman Catholic prelate, bishop of Menongue (1975–1986) and archbishop of Huambo (1986–2003).
- Rebekah Williams, 73, Canadian politician, Nunavut MLA (2000–2004), cancer.
- Zuiho Yamaguchi, 97, Japanese Buddhologist and Tibetologist, pneumonia.

=== 16 ===
- Paul Aizley, 87, American politician, member of the Nevada Assembly (2009–2017).
- Robert Bruce, 74, Canadian politician, Yukon MLA (1996–2000).
- Chuck Ciprich, 81, American racing driver, cancer.
- Eddie Colquhoun, 78, Scottish footballer (Bury, West Bromwich Albion, Sheffield United).
- Gary Eddy, 78, Australian Olympic sprinter (1964).
- Rod Hebron, 80, Canadian Olympic alpine skier (1964, 1968).
- Ahmad Jamal, 92, American jazz pianist, prostate cancer.
- Brian V. Johnstone, 84, Australian priest and theologian.
- Slobodan Lalović, 68, Serbian politician, minister of labour, employment, and social policy (2004–2007).
- Darryl Lenox, 57, American comedian, heart attack.
- Harry J. Mott III, 93, American brigadier general.
- Antônio Celso Queiroz, 89, Brazilian Roman Catholic prelate, auxiliary bishop of São Paulo (1975–2000) and bishop of Catanduva (2000–2009).
- Bernice Rose, 87, American art historian and curator.
- Gregorios Elias Tabé, 82, Syrian Syriac Catholic prelate, auxiliary bishop (1996–1997), coadjutor archbishop (1997–1999) and archbishop (2001–2019) of Damascus.
- Pat Wright, 82, English footballer (Shrewsbury Town, Birmingham City, Derby County).

=== 17 ===
- Oleh Barna, 55, Ukrainian human rights activist and politician, MP (2014–2019), shot.
- Bob Berry, 81, American football player (Minnesota Vikings, Atlanta Falcons).
- Ivan Conti, 76, Brazilian drummer (Azymuth) and composer.
- Viktoriya Divak, 29, Russian handball player (Astrakhanochka, Kuban Krasnodar), fall.
- Valerii Dorokhov, 31, Ukrainian entrepreneur and soldier, military combat.
- Josip Duvančić, 87, Croatian football player (Partizan, İzmirspor) and manager (Sarıyer).
- Rein Jansma, 63, Dutch architect (ZJA).
- Maxine Klibingaitis, 58, Australian actress (Prisoner, Neighbours, Hampton Court).
- Lázár Lovász, 80, Hungarian hammer thrower, Olympic bronze medallist (1968).
- James Melcher, 83, American hedge fund manager and Olympic fencer (1972).
- Peter Miller, 89, American photographer and writer.
- Ernst Oberaigner, 90, Austrian Olympic alpine skier (1960).
- Randy Seiler, 76, American attorney, U.S. attorney for the district of South Dakota (2015–2017), complications from a heart attack.
- Pavlo Shkapenko, 50, Ukrainian footballer (Dynamo Kyiv, Torpedo Moscow, national team).
- Chris Smith, 31, American football player (Jacksonville Jaguars, Cincinnati Bengals, Cleveland Browns).
- April Stevens, 93, American singer ("Deep Purple", "Whispering"), Grammy winner (1964).
- Nikita Storojev, 73, Russian-American operatic singer.
- Ronald R. Thomas, 74, American academic administrator, president of the University of Puget Sound (2003–2016).
- Virgilio Tosi, 97, Italian documentary filmmaker.
- Bente Træen, 64, Norwegian sexologist, cerebral hemorrhage.
- Shlomo Yitzhaki, 79, Iraqi-born Israeli economist, director of the Israel Central Bureau of Statistics (2002–2012).

=== 18 ===
- Väino Aren, 89, Estonian actor and ballet dancer.
- Abdul Azeem, 62, Indian cricketer (Hyderabad), kidney failure.
- Joe Cattini, 100, British soldier.
- Stephan Cohen, 51, French pocket billiards player, heart attack.
- Boris Fausto, 92, Brazilian historian.
- Alfred L. Goldberg, 80, American biochemist and academic.
- Pablo González Casanova, 101, Mexican lawyer, sociologist, and historian.
- Terrence Hardiman, 86, English actor (Gandhi, Sahara, Mask of Murder).
- Stephen Hill, 77, British academic.
- Evan Jones, 95, Jamaican poet, playwright and screenwriter (Eva, Modesty Blaise, Escape to Victory).
- Koko Da Doll, 35, American rapper, subject of Kokomo City, shot.
- Víctor Marrero Padilla, 84, Puerto Rican politician, senator (1993–2000).
- Willie McCarter, 76, American basketball player (Los Angeles Lakers, Portland Trail Blazers) and coach (Detroit Mercy Titans).
- Don McIlhenny, 88, American football player (Detroit Lions, Green Bay Packers, Dallas Cowboys).
- Nimrod Mkono, 79, Tanzanian politician, MP (2000–2015).
- Chandita Mukherjee, 70, Indian documentary film director (Bharat Ki Chhap).
- Colm Murphy, 70, Irish republican and convicted arms trafficker (Omagh bombing), degenerative lung disease.
- Sammy Nicholl, 88, Maltese footballer (Sliema Wanderers, national team)and sports journalist.
- Harold Riley, 88, English painter.
- Albert del Rosario, 83, Filipino diplomat, secretary of foreign affairs (2011–2016) and ambassador to the United States (2001–2006).
- Anita Sanders, 81, Swedish actress and model.
- Vadym Shevchenko, 66, Ukrainian football player (Avanhard Rivne, CSKA Kyiv, Nyva Bereshany) and referee.
- Ajai Singh, 88, Indian military officer, governor of Assam (2003–2008).
- Charles Stanley, 90, American pastor and televangelist, president of the Southern Baptist Convention (1984–1986) and founder of In Touch Ministries.
- Mickey Wernick, 78, English professional poker player.
- Lensley Wolfe, 85, Jamaican jurist, chief justice (1996–2007).

=== 19 ===
- Boris Bjarni Akbashev, 89, Soviet-born Icelandic handball player (Soviet Union national team) and coach (Hapoel Rishon LeZion, Valur).
- Alfonso Araújo Cotes, 99, Colombian politician, governor of Cesar Department (1968–1970, 1975–1977).
- Emilio Berroa, 76, Dominican Olympic weightlifter (1972).
- Finbar Cafferkey, 45, Irish political activist and soldier, mortar fire.
- Robert Dean, 67, American Olympic handball player (1976).
- Walter Demel, 77, German four-time Olympic cross-country skier.
- Yehonatan Geffen, 76, Israeli author, poet and songwriter.
- Todd Haimes, 66, American artistic director.
- Ron Hamilton, 72, American Christian singer-songwriter, preacher, and voice actor.
- Lee Harding, 86, Australian photographer and writer.
- Elain Harwood, 64, English architectural historian.
- Marvin L. Kay, 84, American football coach.
- Shahidul Haque Khan, 74, Bangladeshi film director and lyricist, cancer.
- Michael A. Lebowitz, 85, American-born Canadian economist.
- Lin Hui, 21, Chinese-born Thai giant panda.
- Bob Maguire, 88, Australian Roman Catholic priest, subject of In Bob We Trust.
- Peter Martin, 81, English actor (Emmerdale, The Royle Family, Brassed Off).
- Volodymyr Melnychenko, 91, Ukrainian visual artist, sculptor, and architect.
- Moonbin, 25, South Korean singer (Astro), actor (Boys Over Flowers, At Eighteen) and dancer.
- John Newman, 86, English architectural historian.
- Jeremy Nobis, 52, American Olympic alpine skier (1994).
- Harriet Nordlund, 68, Swedish actress.
- Charles-Ferdinand Nothomb, 86, Belgian politician, twice president of the Chamber of Representatives, minister of foreign affairs (1980–1981) and the interior (1981–1986).
- Robert O'Neill, 86, Australian historian.
- Coulter Osborne, 88, Canadian Olympic basketball player (1956) and arbitrator, integrity commissioner of Ontario (2001–2007).
- Elena Pampoulova, 50, Bulgarian Olympic tennis player (1992).
- Dmitry Petrov, 33, Russian anarchist activist, ethnographer and historian.
- Martin Petzold, 67, German classical tenor (Thomanerchor).
- Ed Picson, 69, Filipino sportscaster (Philippine Basketball Association), sports administrator, and columnist.
- Luc Portelance, 63, Canadian police officer, president of the Canada Border Services Agency (2010–2015).
- Richard Riordan, 92, American investment banker, businessman and politician, mayor of Los Angeles (1993–2001).
- Federico Salvatore, 63, Italian singer-songwriter and comedian, complications from a cerebal haemorrhage.
- Takeo Shiina, 93, Japanese business executive.
- Bud Shuster, 91, American politician, member of the U.S. House of Representatives (1973–2001), complications from a fractured hip.
- Ann M. Torr, 88, American politician, member of the New Hampshire House of Representatives (1984–1998).
- Gloria Cranmer Webster, 91, Canadian writer, activist, and museum curator.
- I Ketut Wiana, 77, Indonesian Hindu scholar.
- Dave Wilcox, 80, American Hall of Fame football player (San Francisco 49ers).
- Richard Woldendorp, 96, Dutch-born Australian aerial photographer. (death announced on this date)

=== 20 ===
- Sir Frank Blackman, 96, Barbadian civil servant.
- Pamela Chopra, 75, Indian playback singer (Kabhi Kabhie, Kaala Patthar, Chandni), pneumonia.
- David Ellis, 90, English composer.
- Marek Fila, 63, Slovak mathematician.
- Josep Maria Fusté, 82, Spanish footballer (Barcelona, Hércules, national team).
- Salma Khadra Jayyusi, 95, Palestinian poet and anthropologist, founder of PROTA.
- Ivar Kristianslund, 89, Norwegian preacher and politician, leader of the New Future Coalition Party (1998–2001).
- Margaret Nielsen, 90, New Zealand pianist.
- Khalil Oghab, 99, Iranian wrestler and circus performer.
- Roy Tuckman, 84, American radio host (Something's Happening).
- John Wright, 79, American film editor (The Hunt for Red October, Speed, X-Men), cancer.
- Andy Wyper, 83, Scottish boxer.
- Kenji Yonekura, 88, Japanese Olympic boxer (1956).

=== 21 ===
- Enver Baig, 77, Pakistani politician, senator (2003–2009) and chairperson of the BISP (2013–2014).
- Ernie Barrett, 93, American basketball player (Boston Celtics).
- Ernő Béres, 94, Hungarian Olympic long-distance runner (1952).
- James B. Busey IV, 90, American admiral.
- Mahulena Čejková, 86, Czech medical doctor and politician, MP (1990–1992).
- Maria Charles, 93, English actress (Agony, Hot Fuzz, Never the Twain).
- Peter Cole, 81, American linguist.
- Kandy Cordova, 86, American politician, member of the New Mexico House of Representatives (2001–2007).
- Mike Coulman, 78, English rugby league (Salford, national team) and union (national team) player.
- John A. Curry, 88, American academic administrator, president of Northeastern University (1989–1996).
- Stanley Deser, 92, Polish-born American physicist.
- Dream Alliance, 22, British Thoroughbred racehorse, Welsh Grand National winner (2009).
- Cornell Fleischer, 72, American historian.
- Mirella Giai, 93, Italian politician, senator (2008–2013).
- Trilochan Kanungo, 82, Indian politician, MP (1999–2004).
- Dalia Kuodytė, 61, Lithuanian historian and politician, MP (2008–2016).
- Emily Meggett, 90, American chef and author.
- Ivan Moscovich, 96, Yugoslav-born Dutch toy and game designer and Holocaust survivor.
- Viktor Olsen, 99, Norwegian Olympic long-distance runner (1952).
- John O'Sullivan, 90, Australian Olympic cyclist (1956).
- Ken Potts, 102, American World War II veteran, survivor of the attack on the USS Arizona.
- Sergio Rendine, 68, Italian composer, cultural manager and theatre director (Teatro Marrucino).
- Ted Richards, 76, American cartoonist, lung cancer.
- Jane Ritchie, 87, New Zealand academic.
- Roy G. Saltman, 90, American electrical engineer.
- Juan Carlos Sarnari, 81, Argentine footballer (River Plate, Santa Fe, national team).
- Kate Saunders, 62, English author (Winnie-the-Pooh: The Best Bear in All the World), journalist and actress (Angels), cancer.
- Mark Stewart, 62, English musician (The Pop Group) and songwriter ("She Is Beyond Good and Evil", "This Is Stranger Than Love").
- Tasileta Teevale, 50, Samoan-born New Zealand academic, cancer.
- John Tranter, 79, Australian poet, founder of Jacket.

=== 22 ===
- Edward S. Ayensu, 87, Ghanaian environmental scientist.
- Mudar Badran, 89, Jordanian politician, prime minister (1976–1979, 1980–1984, 1989–1991).
- Sir Alan Bailey, 91, British civil servant.
- István Bajkai, 59, Hungarian politician, MP (since 2018).
- Hugh Byrne, 83, Irish politician, TD (1969–1982).
- Ron Cahute, 68, Canadian singer-songwriter and accordionist.
- James Chan Soon Cheong, 96, Malaysian Roman Catholic prelate, bishop of Melaka-Johor (1973–2001).
- Herb Douglas, 101, American long jumper, Olympic bronze medalist (1948).
- Bernard Geary, 89, Irish composer, teacher and pianist.
- Marcela González Salas, 75, Mexican politician, president of the Chamber of Deputies (2006), cancer.
- Len Goodman, 78, English ballroom dancer, television presenter, and coach (Strictly Come Dancing, Dancing with the Stars), bone cancer.
- Greg Howard, 58, American Chapman Stick player.
- Barry Humphries, 89, Australian comedian (Dame Edna Everage) and actor (Bedazzled, Finding Nemo), complications from hip surgery.
- Ju Ming, 85, Taiwanese sculptor, suicide.
- Rambahadur Limbu, 83, Nepali soldier, recipient of the Victoria Cross, heart and kidney failure.
- Mick Loftus, 93, Irish Gaelic footballer (Mayo) and sports administrator, president of the Gaelic Athletic Association (1985–1988).
- Dale Meeks, 48, English actor (Emmerdale, Byker Grove), heart failure.
- Catherine Morris, 94, British figure skater.
- Sunil Kumar Podder, 86, Indian molecular biologist and biophysicist.
- Frank Shu, 79, Chinese-American astrophysicist (density wave theory), president of the National Tsing Hua University (2002–2006) and member of the National Academy of Sciences.
- Emanuel V. Soriano, 86, Filipino engineer and academic administrator, president of the University of the Philippines (1979–1981).
- Ulf Sundqvist, 78, Finnish politician, minister of education (1972–1975) and trade (1979–1981).
- Art Uytendaal, 92, Dutch-born Australian equestrian.
- Werner Voigt, 75, German football player and coach (1. FC Union Berlin).
- Juhn Atsushi Wada, 99, Japanese-born Canadian neurologist.
- Carol Wall, 69–70, Canadian labor and social justice activist.

=== 23 ===
- Anatoly Akentyev, 81, Russian Olympic cross-country skier (1968).
- Nikolay Bortsov, 77, Russian politician, MP (since 2003).
- Tori Bowie, 32, American athlete, Olympic champion (2016), complications from childbirth.
- Robert Forrest-Webb, 94, British author (And to My Nephew Albert I Leave the Island What I Won off Fatty Hagan in a Poker Game, The Great Dinosaur Robbery) and journalist.
- Keith Gattis, 52, American country music singer, songwriter ("El Cerrito Place", "When I See This Bar"), and producer, tractor accident.
- Randor Guy, 85, Indian lawyer, columnist (The Hindu, The Indian Express) and film historian.
- Yvonne Jacquette, 88, American painter.
- Zahoor Hussain Khoso, Pakistani politician, speaker of the Provincial Assembly of Balochistan (1990), lung cancer.
- Alton H. Maddox Jr., 77, American lawyer.
- Boris Markarov, 88, Russian water polo player, Olympic bronze medallist (1956).
- John Miller, 79, American baseball player (New York Yankees, Los Angeles Dodgers, Chunichi Dragons).
- Warren Monson, 48, Australian sidecar speedway racer, race collision.
- Billy Oatman, 57, American ten-pin bowler, complications from a stroke.
- Rainer Osselmann, 62, German water polo player, Olympic bronze medallist (1984).
- Robert Patrick, 85, American playwright, poet, and lyricist.
- Jej Perfekcyjność, Polish sociologist, author, and social activist.
- Gemini Shankaran, 98, Indian circus owner.
- Dick Towers, 92, American football coach (Southern Illinois Salukis).
- Dzhasharbek Uzdenov, 56, Russian politician, MP (since 2021).
- Frank Welsh, 91, British historian and writer.

=== 24 ===
- Tomas Alibegov, 85, Russian banker, director general of Eurobank (1982–1987).
- Alfredo Arreguín, 88, Mexican-American painter.
- David E. Carter, 80, American entrepreneur and writer, lymphoma.
- Șerban Ciochină, 83, Romanian Olympic triple jumper (1964, 1968). (death announced on this date)
- Ann Crowley, 93, American singer and actress.
- Fumio Demura, 84, Japanese martial artist.
- José Aníbal Díaz, 52, Puerto Rican politician, member of the House of Representatives (since 2015), cancer.
- Peter Enahoro, 88, Nigerian journalist (New African).
- Tarek Fatah, 73, Pakistani-Canadian journalist (Toronto Sun) and writer, cancer.
- Aftandil Israfilov, 82, Azerbaijani garmon player.
- Senahid Halilović, 65, Bosnian linguist, member of the ANUBH.
- Alejandro Hamed, 89, Paraguayan diplomat and politician, minister of foreign affairs (2008–2009).
- Ernst Huberty, 96, German-Luxembourgish sports journalist (Sportschau).
- Donald Lambro, 82, American journalist.
- Sir Basil Markesinis, 78, Greek-British legal scholar, complications from dementia.
- Brian Frank Martin, 86, Australian judge, chief justice of the Northern Territory (1993–2003).
- Arlie Neaville, 85, American singer and songwriter.
- Joe Novsek, 83, American football player (Oakland Raiders).
- Mike Pride, 76, American journalist (Concord Monitor) and writer.
- Ove Krogh Rants, 96, Danish Olympic cyclist (1952).
- Dennis Ribant, 81, American baseball player (New York Mets, Pittsburgh Pirates, Detroit Tigers).
- Gilbert Sheldon, 96, American Roman Catholic prelate, bishop of Steubenville (1992–2002) and auxiliary bishop of Cleveland (1976–1992).
- Casper R. Taylor Jr., 88, American politician, speaker (1994–2003) and member (1975–2003) of the Maryland House of Delegates.
- Chai-Shin Yu, 91, Korean-born Canadian professor of Korean studies

=== 25 ===
- Sir Norman Adsetts, 92, British businessman.
- Frank Agrama, 93, American film director (Queen Kong, Dawn of the Mummy) and producer, founder of Harmony Gold USA.
- Parkash Singh Badal, 95, Indian politician, minister of agriculture (1977) and four-time chief minister of Punjab, complications from bronchial asthma.
- Harry Belafonte, 96, American Hall of Fame musician ("The Banana Boat Song", "Jump in the Line"), actor (Odds Against Tomorrow), and civil rights activist, heart failure.
- Sir Winfried Bischoff, 81, German-born British banker, chairman of Citigroup (2007–2009) and Lloyds Banking Group (2009–2014).
- Gennadi Bogachyov, 78, Russian actor (Sherlock Holmes and Dr. Watson, Speed, Simple Things).
- Himangshu Mohan Choudhury, 83, Indian civil servant.
- John Cockcroft, 88, English journalist (Financial Times, The Daily Telegraph) and politician, MP (1974–1979).
- Letty Eisenhauer, 87, American artist.
- Billy "The Kid" Emerson, 97, American singer-songwriter ("Red Hot", "When It Rains, It Really Pours").
- Obaro Ikime, 86, Nigerian historian.
- Hanna Johansen, 83, German-born Swiss writer (7×7 Tales of a Sevensleeper).
- Vera Krepkina, 90, Ukrainian long jumper, Olympic champion (1960).
- François Léotard, 81, French politician, minister of culture (1986–1988) and defence (1993–1995).
- Alapati Lui Mataeliga, 70, Samoan Roman Catholic prelate, archbishop of Samoa-Apia (since 2003) and superior of Tokelau (since 2015).
- Robin Mathews, 91, Canadian poet and activist.
- Earl F. Palmer, 91, American Presbyterian minister.
- Edwin Teague, 88, American Olympic sport shooter (1964).
- Pamela Turnure, 85, American press secretary (Jacqueline Kennedy), lung cancer.
- John J. Uicker, 84, American mechanical engineer, lung cancer.
- Paul van Vliet, 87, Dutch comedian and UNICEF goodwill ambassador.
- Barry Webster, 88, English footballer. (death announced on this date)
- Manfred Weiss, 88, German composer.
- Morison Zuill, 86, Scottish cricketer (national team).

=== 26 ===
- Jerry Apodaca, 88, American politician, governor of New Mexico (1975–1979) and chair of the PCPFS (1978–1980).
- Željko Bilecki, 72, Canadian soccer player (Toronto Metros-Croatia, Tulsa Roughnecks, national team).
- Michel Biron, 89, Canadian politician, senator (2001–2009).
- Ronald Bradley, 93, British medical doctor and inventor.
- Boris Budnikov, 81, Russian sailor, Olympic silver medallist (1980).
- Chandan Ram Das, 65, Indian politician, Uttarakhand MLA (since 2007), cardiac arrest.
- Cilia van Dijk, 81, Dutch film producer (Anna & Bella), Oscar winner (1986).
- Tony Dreyfus, 84, French lawyer and politician, deputy (1997–2012).
- Eqtidaar, 7, Irish-bred British Thoroughbred racehorse, winner of the Commonwealth Cup (2018), euthanized. (death announced on this date)
- Isidore Fernandes, 76, Indian Roman Catholic prelate, bishop of Allahabad (1988–2013), heart attack.
- Stefano Gentili, 65, Italian politician, president of the Province of Grosseto (1995–1999).
- Sonny Gordon, 57, American football player (Tampa Bay Buccaneers, Hamilton Tiger-Cats, Saskatchewan Roughriders), amyotrophic lateral sclerosis.
- George Greenamyer, 83, American sculptor (Milwaukee).
- Doris Gregory, 102, Canadian writer and activist.
- Maja Hug, 95, Swiss Olympic figure skater (1948).
- A. Majeed Khan, 93, Bangladeshi politician and diplomat, minister of education (1982–1984).
- Sami Khayat, 79, Lebanese stage actor and comedian, bone cancer.
- Roger Lise, 95, French politician, senator (1977–1995).
- Martin Lönnebo, 93, Swedish Lutheran clergyman, bishop of Linköping (1980–1994).
- Jay Mala, 64, Indian political activist, fall.
- Mamukkoya, 76, Indian actor (Sanmanassullavarkku Samadhanam, Perumazhakkalam, Innathe Chintha Vishayam) and comedian, heart attack.
- Robert Meeks, 89, American politician.
- Stina Rautelin, 59, Finnish-Swedish actress (Beck, Fallet, Rederiet).
- Adela Ringuelet, 93, Argentine astronomer.
- Alzira Rufino, 73, Brazilian writer and social activist.
- Samarveer Singh, 33, Indian academic, suicide by hanging.
- Abbas-Ali Soleimani, 75, Iranian ayatollah, member of the Assembly of Experts (since 2005), shot.
- Tangaraju Suppiah, 46, Singaporean drug trafficker, execution by hanging.
- Too Too, 32, Burmese Lethwei fighter.
- Wang Shaojun, 67, Chinese military officer, director of the Central Guard Bureau (2015–2021) and deputy (2017–2022).
- Dee Dee Wood, 95, American choreographer (Mary Poppins, The Sound of Music, Chitty Chitty Bang Bang).
- Belén Clarisa Velutini, 99, Venezuelan businesswoman and banker.
- Dimitris Xistras, 68, Cypriot actor.
- Zhang Jihui, 96, Chinese air force officer, deputy commander of PLAAF (1973–1978).

=== 27 ===
- David Henry Breaux, 50, American unhoused man, stabbed.
- Banko Brown, 24, American homeless transgender man, shot.
- John Cash, 88, American football player (Denver Broncos).
- Neville Chesters, 77, American rock music manager and road manager (Jimi Hendrix, The Who).
- Dick Chrobak, 81, Canadian football player (Edmonton Eskimos, BC Lions).
- Jean-Paul Costa, 81, French jurist, president of the European Court of Human Rights (2007–2011).
- Dame Rosemary Cramp, 93, English archaeologist and academic.
- Ólafur Garðar Einarsson, 90, Icelandic politician, member (1971–1999) and speaker (1995–1999) of the Althing, minister of education, science and culture (1991–1995).
- Girma Yeshitila, Ethiopian politician, shot.
- Dick Groat, 92, American baseball (Pittsburgh Pirates, St. Louis Cardinals) and basketball player (Fort Wayne Pistons), World Series champion (1960, 1964), complications from a stroke.
- Wee Willie Harris, 90, English rock and roll singer.
- Dominic Kwiatkowski, 69, English medical researcher and geneticist.
- Giovanni Lombardo Radice, 68, Italian actor (The House on the Edge of the Park, Cannibal Apocalypse, City of the Living Dead).
- Francis Macnab, 91, Australian Christian minister and psychologist, founder of the Cairnmillar Institute.
- Ray Minus, 58, Bahamian boxer, amyotrophic lateral sclerosis.
- Gerald Nesbitt, 91, American football player (Ottawa Rough Riders, Arkansas Razorbacks).
- Ramiro Oliveros, 82, Spanish actor (Cannibal Apocalypse, Naked Therapy, Death's Newlyweds).
- Beata Maria Kitsikis Panagopoulos, 97, Greek-born American professor of art.
- Dennis Reid, 80, Canadian art historian and curator, heart failure.
- Kaur Singh, 74, Indian boxer.
- Jerry Springer, 79, British-born American television host (Jerry Springer, America's Got Talent) and politician, mayor of Cincinnati (1977–1978), pancreatic cancer.
- Wiktor Wysoczański, 84, Polish Old Catholic prelate, superior of the Polish Catholic Church (since 1995).
- Gayle Graham Yates, 82, American academic.
- Barbara Young, 92, English actress (Coronation Street, I, Claudius, Last of the Summer Wine).

=== 28 ===
- Andrea Augello, 62, Italian politician, senator (2006–2018, since 2022).
- Tim Bachman, 71, Canadian guitarist (Bachman–Turner Overdrive, Brave Belt).
- LeRoy Carhart, 81, American medical doctor, subject of After Tiller.
- Agnes G. Doody, 93, American academic.
- Helge Engelke, 61, German guitarist (Fair Warning), colon cancer.
- Renyldo Ferreira, 99, Brazilian four-time Olympic equestrian.
- Jim Fox, 81, British modern pentathlete, Olympic champion (1976).
- Martyn Gough, 57, British Anglican priest.
- Robson Gracie, 88, Brazilian jujutsu master.
- Claude Gray, 91, American country music singer-songwriter ("Family Bible").
- Ranajit Guha, 99, Indian historian.
- David Jacobs, 45, Indonesian table tennis player, Paralympic bronze medallist (2012, 2020).
- Taini Jamison, 95, New Zealand netball coach (national team).
- Harold Kushner, 88, American rabbi and author (When Bad Things Happen to Good People, Overcoming Life's Disappointments, When All You've Ever Wanted Isn't Enough).
- Peter Lilienthal, 93, German film director (David, Das Autogramm, Dear Mr. Wonderful).
- Bengt Lindqvist, 89, Swedish Olympic ice hockey player (1960).
- Sergio Ottolina, 80, Italian Olympic sprinter (1964, 1968).
- Yuri Petrov, 48, Russian footballer (RKC, Twente, Volendam).
- Vincent Stewart, 64, Jamaican-born American Marine Corps general, director of the Defense Intelligence Agency (2015–2017).
- Ben Tompkins, 93, American football referee (NFL).
- Ferry Torrez, 54, Danish circus performer, cancer.
- Ken Westbury, 96, British cinematographer (The Singing Detective).

=== 29 ===
- Sylvia Bacon, 91, American judge, associate judge of the Superior Court of the District of Columbia (1970–1991), pulmonary fibrosis.
- Adam Brace, 43, British playwright and director, complications from a stroke.
- S. S. Chakravarthy, 55, Indian film producer (Raasi, Vaalee, Kadhal Sadugudu), cancer.
- Padma Desai, 91, Indian-American development economist.
- Edward J. Garcia, 94, American jurist, judge of the U.S. District Court for Eastern California (since 1984).
- Janet G. Mullins Grissom, 73, American lobbyist, White House director of political affairs (1992–1993), assistant secretary of state for legislative affairs (1989–1992).
- David L. Holmes, 90, American church historian.
- Rod Kedward, 86, British historian.
- Desmond Kelly, 86, Sri-Lankan born Australian musician and actor.
- Hermann Kerckhoff, 85, German-born Canadian Olympic slalom canoeist (1972).
- Sergei Kolesnikov, 68, Russian actor (Man with an Accordion, Daddy, A Good Day to Die Hard) and television presenter.
- Yuri Korolyov, 60, Russian artistic gymnast, nine-time world champion.
- Nicolae Neagoe, 81, Romanian bobsledder, Olympic bronze medallist (1968).
- Abu al-Hussein al-Husseini al-Qurashi, Islamist militant, caliph of the Islamic State (since 2022).
- Larry Rivers, 73, American basketball player (Harlem Globetrotters), cancer.
- Eero Saari, 94, Finnish Olympic ice hockey player (1952).
- Don Sebesky, 85, American composer, arranger, and conductor (Giant Box, The Rape of El Morro).
- Mike Shannon, 83, American baseball player (St. Louis Cardinals) and broadcaster, World Series champion (1964, 1967), stroke.
- Ralph Taaviri, 68, French Polynesian trade unionist, independence activist, and environmentalist.
- István Vágó, 74, Hungarian television host and political activist.
- Ralfe Whistler, 92, British naturalist.
- Richard B. Woodward, 70, American arts critic, idiopathic pulmonary fibrosis.

=== 30 ===
- Ralph Boston, 83, American long jumper, Olympic champion (1960), stroke.
- Elizabeth Scott, Duchess of Buccleuch, 68, Scottish noble and philanthropist.
- Ian Crowden, 90, Australian cricketer (Tasmania).
- Tony Doyle, 64, British racing cyclist, pancreatic cancer.
- George I. Fujimoto, 102, American chemist.
- Patricia Hamilton, 86, Canadian actress (Road to Avonlea, My Bloody Valentine, Middle Age Crazy).
- Havre de Grace, 16, American Thoroughbred racehorse.
- Ron Hazelton, 80, American television host.
- Ntate Daniel Kgwadi, 55–56, South African academic administrator, rector (2004–2014) and vice-chancellor (2014–2021) of the North-West University.
- Luis Larrosa, 65, Uruguayan Olympic basketball player (1984).
- Albert Lightfoot, 87, English cricketer (Northamptonshire).
- Chris Qua, 71, Australian jazz musician.
- Broderick Smith, 75, English-born Australian musician (Carson, The Dingoes) and actor.
- Lance Ten Broeck, 67, American professional golfer and caddie.
- Mihails Vasiļonoks, 74, Latvian ice hockey player (Dinamo Riga, Soviet Union national team), coach, and executive (HK Liepājas Metalurgs).
- Vyacheslav Zaitsev, 85, Russian fashion designer, gastrointestinal disease.
- Jock Zonfrillo, 46, Scottish-Australian chef and television presenter (Restaurant Revolution, MasterChef Australia).
