= Zuill =

Zuill is both a given name and a surname. Notable people with the name include:

- Zuill Bailey (born 1972), American cellist
- Aljame Zuill (born 1976), Bermudian footballer
- Bill Zuill (1901–1960), New Zealand footballer
- Dennis Zuill (born 1978), Bermudian footballer
- Morison Zuill (1937–2023), Scottish cricketer
- William Zuill (1867–1942), Australian politician
