= Franklin G. Torr =

American politician

Member of the New Hampshire House of Representatives from the Strafford 20th district
- In office 1980–1982

Member of the New Hampshire House of Representatives from the Strafford 6th district
- In office 1982–1986

Member of the New Hampshire Senate from the 21st district
- In office 1986–1992

Member of the New Hampshire House of Representatives from the Strafford 12th district
- In office 1992–2000

Personal details
- Born: April 16, 1930 Rochester, New Hampshire, U.S.
- Died: August 3, 2023 (aged 93)
- Party: Republican
- Spouse: Ann M. Torr
- Relatives: Ralph W. Torr (brother)

Franklin G. Torr (April 16, 1930 – August 3, 2023) was an American politician. He served as a Republican member for the Strafford 6th, 12th and 20th district of the New Hampshire House of Representatives. He also served as a member for the 21st district of the New Hampshire Senate.

Torr died on August 3, 2023, at the age of 93.
