= Ralph W. Torr =

American politician (1931–2024)

Member of the New Hampshire House of Representatives from the Strafford 11th district
- In office 1982–1992

Member of the New Hampshire House of Representatives from the Strafford 19th district
- In office 1992–1998

Personal details
- Born: August 8, 1931 Rochester, New Hampshire, U.S.
- Died: October 27, 2024 (aged 93)
- Party: Republican
- Relatives: Franklin G. Torr (brother); Ann M. Torr (sister-in-law)

Ralph W. Torr (August 8, 1931 – October 27, 2024) was an American politician. He served as a Republican member for the Strafford 11th and 19th district of the New Hampshire House of Representatives.

Torr died on October 27, 2024, at the age of 93.
