= Anatoly Makagonov =

Soviet volleyball player (1932–2023)

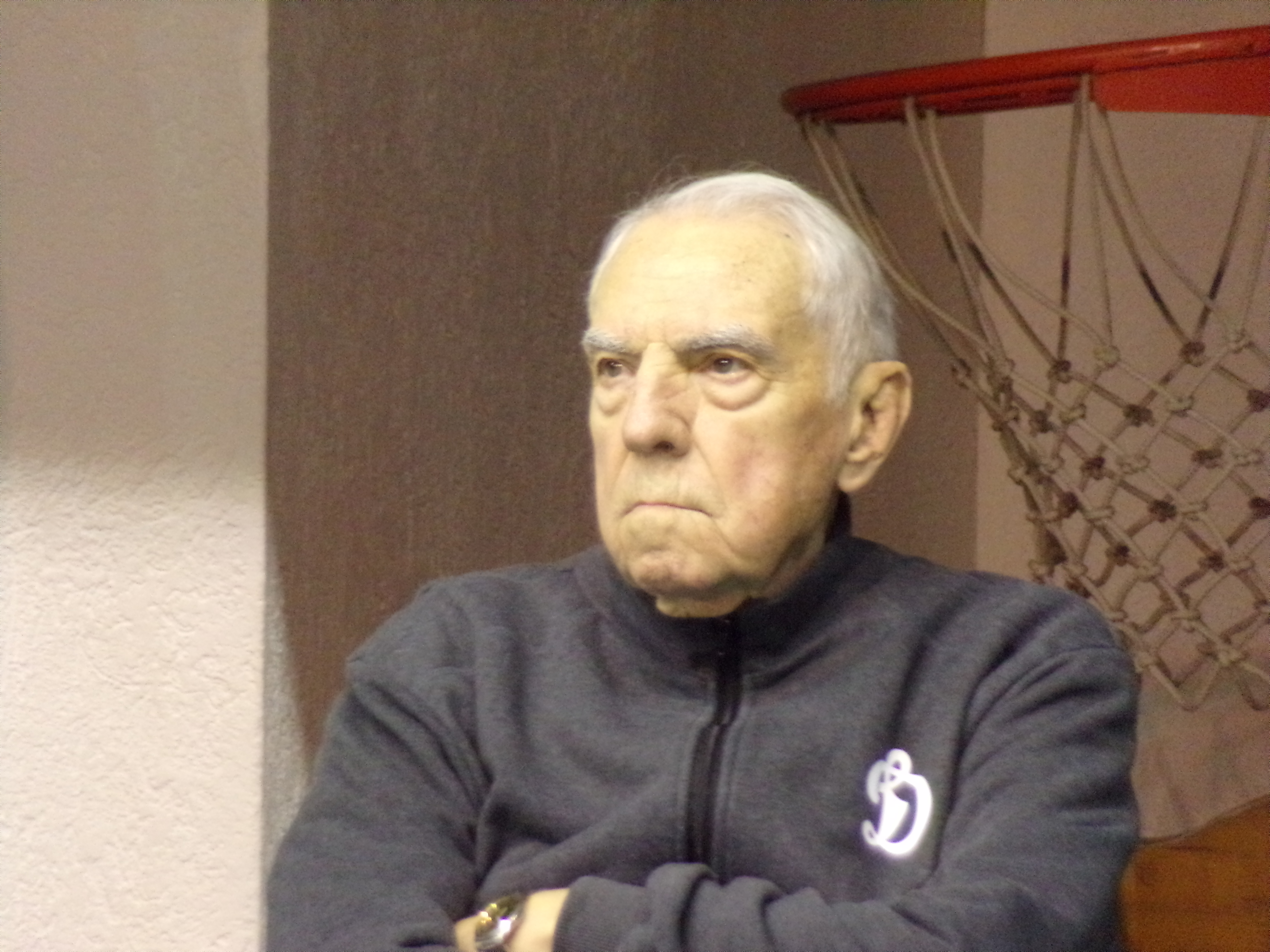
Makagonov in 2018

Anatoly Vladimirovich Makagonov (Russian: Анатолий Владимирович Макагонов; 18 May 1932 – 9 April 2023) was a Soviet and Russian volleyball player and coach who was awarded the honorary title Meritorious Coach of the USSR (1986).

== Career ==
=== As a player ===
Makagonov graduated from the Azerbaijan State Institute of Physical Culture in 1956.

Makagonov played in Burevestnik Baku. He was made a Master of Sports of the USSR (1956). As part of the national team of the Azerbaijan SSR, he became the bronze medalist of the Summer Spartakiad of the Peoples of the USSR in 1959.

Makagonov was bronze medalist of the 1956 World Championship as part of the Soviet Union.

=== Coaching ===
Makagonov was best known as the coach of the Chelyabinsk women's team Dynamo-Metar (1976–1994, 2008–2010, 2017–2019). In 1993, the team under his leadership in the first Cup of Russia.

Under the leadership of Anatoly Makagonov, the USSR women's student team also won silver medals at the 1987 Universiade in Zagreb.
