= Bernice Rose =

Art historian and curator

Bernice Harriet Rose (née Berend; October 7, 1935 – April 16, 2023) was an American art historian and curator.

== Early life and education ==
Born in Miami Beach, Florida, she moved to Brooklyn, New York at age six. Rose obtained her bachelor's in fine arts from Hunter College and a master's in art history from the Institute of Fine Arts, New York University.

In 1956, she married Herbert Rose, a legal adviser.

== Career ==
Rose began her career at the Museum of Modern Art (MoMA) as a secretary and later became a senior curator in the drawings department. During her tenure, she organized exhibitions including A Cezanne Treasure: The Basel Sketchbooks, Surrealism, and Jackson Pollock: Drawing Into Painting. She also authored publications such as Allegories of Modernism: Contemporary Drawing (1992).

In 1993, after her time at MoMA, Rose joined Pace Gallery in New York as the director of special exhibitions. She curated exhibitions such as Henry Moore's 1930s and '40s drawings and Picasso, Braque and Early Film in Cubism.

In 2007, Rose was appointed the inaugural chief curator of the Menil Collection's Drawing Institute in Houston. During her tenure, exhibitions featured artists such as Tony Smith, Claes Oldenburg, and Cy Twombly. Rose retired from Menil in 2014.

Later, Rose was the chief editor for the "Jasper Johns Catalogue Raisonne of Drawing" (2018) and an adviser to collector Louisa Stude Sarofim.
