= Tamilla Nasirova =

Azerbaijani mathematician (1936–2023)

Tamilla Nasirova (Azerbaijani: Tamilla Nəsirova; 20 October 1936 – 12 April 2023) was an Azerbaijani mathematician. She specialized in probability theory and is known for her discoveries pertaining to the semi-Markov process. She was a professor at Baku State University from 1980 to 2018 and at the Karadeniz Technical University from 1996 to 2000. Nasirova was the first woman to earn a doctorate in mathematics in Azerbaijan and the first Azerbaijani woman to become a professor of mathematics.

== Biography ==
Tamilla Nasirova was born in Nəvahı, Azerbaijan on 20 October 1936. She attended School No. 176 in Baku and graduated in 1953. She enrolled in Azerbaijan State University (now Baku State University) and graduated in 1958. After studying at the Ukrainian Academy of Sciences and Moscow State University, she earned a Doctor of Philosophy at the Tashkent University of Information Technologies in 1964. In 1980, Nasirova was given a position as an associate professor of mathematics at Baku State University, becoming the first woman to hold such a position in Azerbaijan. She became a full professor in 1995. She also taught at the Karadeniz Technical University in Turkey from 1996 to 2000. Nasirova continued teaching at Baku State University until 2018, teaching probability theory and mathematical statistics.

Nasirova worked in probability theory and is known for her work involving semi-Markov processes, proving the ergodic theorem of semi-Markov processes and advancing several related developments that influenced their study. Nasirova was a researcher for the Azerbaijan National Academy of Sciences Institute of Control Systems for much of her life, beginning in 1958, continuing until 1980, and resuming her work in 1994. During her career, she published a total of 96 scientific works and trained ten doctoral students. She was awarded three Azerbaijani Certificates of Honor: two from Baku State University in 2007 and 2016, and one from the National Academy of Sciences in 2016. She was also recognized as an Honored Teacher of the Republic in 2009. Nasirova died on 12 April 2023, at the age of 86.
