= Carol Wall =

Canadian labour and social justice activist

Carol Wall (c. 1953 – April 22, 2023) was a Canadian labour and social justice activist.

== Political career ==
Wall became involved in labour politics during the seventeen years she spent working for the Toronto Star, holding various positions in its ranks, where she became involved as an activist in the Southern Ontario Newspaper Guild (SONG). Starting out as a shop steward, she became the union's representative on various labour bodies. In 1995, she became a representative for the Communications, Energy and Paperworkers Union of Canada.

In 1998, she co-chaired the Commonwealth Study Conference. She co-authored the book Education for Changing Unions.

Wall was hired in 2000 as the Communications, Energy and Paperworkers Union of Canada's first director of human rights, and she participated on their behalf in the World Conference against Racism held in Durban, South Africa in 2001. In 2002, she was elected vice president of the Canadian Labour Congress, representing workers of colour. She also worked as a national negotiator for the Public Service Alliance of Canada.

Wall was a member of the Coalition of Black Trade Unionists, and served on the Women's Committee of the Ontario Federation of Labour and the CLC's Human Rights Committee. She also served as a member of several boards including the Pay Equity Advocacy and Legal Services Clinic, York University's Centre for Research on Work and Society and the Chiropractic College of Ontario.

Wall ran for the presidency of the Canadian Labour Congress in 2005, gaining 37% of the popular vote in spite of being blocked from many union caucuses and unions directing their members to vote against her, while running against incumbent Ken Georgetti. Her campaign was seen as part of a broader movement to set the Labour Congress back on a more strategic, inclusive member focused path.

== Personal life ==
Wall and her partner Gerry have three grown children. Born and raised in Toronto, Carol later lived in Warkworth, east of Toronto. She was employed as the Regional Director for the Federal Mediation Conciliation Service, Ontario Region, working within the labour program.

She died in April 2023.
