= Dimitris Xistras =

Cypriot actor(

- Δημήτρης Ξύστρας
- Born: June 25, 1954
- Died: April 26, 2023 (aged 68)
- Citizenship: Cypriot
- Education: Higher School of Dramatic Art Theater of Karolos Koun
- Occupation: Actor
- Awards
- Military career
- Allegiance: Cyprus
- Branch: Cypriot National Guard
- Rank: Sergeant
- Unit: 33 Commando Battalion
- Conflicts: Turkish Invasion of Cyprus

Dimitris Xistras (Greek: Δημήτρης Ξύστρας) (1954 – April 26, 2023) was a Cypriot actor.

== Early life ==
Xistras was born in the village of Agios Epiktitos, in the Kyrenia District of Cyprus in 1954. In 1973, as part of his conscription, he entered the Special Forces of the Cypriot National Guard and was placed in the 32nd Assault Company of the 33 Commando Battalion, eventually taking part in its battles during the Turkish invasion of Cyprus in 1974. He later went on to study at the Higher School of Dramatic Art Theater of Karolos Koun, to become an actor.

== Career ==
In his career, he worked with the Theatrical Organization of Cyprus, the New Theatre of Vladimir Kafkarides, the Satirical School, the Theatre of Arts in London, with regards to TV, worked mainly with the Cypriot State Broadcaster RIK and ANT1 although he worked with every major channel in Cyprus.

== Filmography ==
TV shows:

- Agia stoliste then yiayia
- An apple a day (1998)
- All you don't know
- When I grow up
- If your neighbors your enemy
- Steps in the sand
- Run neighbors
- Galatia and Pygmalion
- Gia ton para gia ton fitsio
- Taxi Office
- Everyone around (2012)
- Show me your friend (2006)
- Double life
- Egw h Leto Domestica
- Fotis was deaphened
- Dangerous zone
- The wheel will turn
- Kamomata kai aromata
- Karaoli ala crem
- Mpatso agapi mou
- Uncover her so I can see
- O katheis jei pou ponei
- The scramlers
- Channel leaders
- Stone River
- The Goldfish
- The third mark
- The paper box
- The seventh key
- The water of Dropis

Cinema productions:

- Roads and Oranges
- The last shoot
- Plot 12
- The summer of our love

Theatre productions:

- H Mpora (1987)
- Thesmophoriazusae (1997)
- The Oresteia (1982)
