= Ferry Torrez =

Dutch circus performer (1968–2023)

Ferry Polderman (1968 – 28 April 2023), known by his stage name Ferry Torrez, was a Dutch circus performer. Born to Frank Torrez, he lived in Amsterdam-Oost and grew up around circus performers and animals. In 1980, his father bought Circus Hoepla and renamed it Circus Franklin.

As a circus performer, Torrez began his career with Karah Khavak, a performer with reptiles. Torrez performed throughout Europe, including in the first gay circus in the Netherlands, in 2010. He performed primarily with crocodiles, which he stored in an enclosure next door to his house. He also owned macaws, iguanas, monitor lizards, snakes, scorpions, and tarantulas. Throughout his career, he toured across the Netherlands, as well as touring in the Ivory Coast. He had multiple scars on his head due to inserting it in the mouths of his crocodiles. In his later life, he performed educational shows.

Torrez was a notable figure in LGBTQ culture in Amsterdam, namely in its leather subculture, and worked as a bouncer for Spijkerbar—Amsterdam's first gay bar—during the COVID-19 pandemic in the Netherlands. He also made regular appearances on television.

In 2016, Torrez was arrested for possessing narcotics and ill-gotten money in his alligator sanctuary, which they guarded. According to his lawyer, he had them on behalf of another person, whom he did not question.

Torrez died on 28 April 2023, aged 54, of cancer. His animals were sent to sanctuaries across Europe in the months leading to his death. He was cremated on 8 May.
