= Ann M. Torr =

American politician

Member of the New Hampshire House of Representatives from the Strafford 6th district
- In office 1984–1992

Member of the New Hampshire House of Representatives from the Strafford 12th district
- In office 1992–1998

Personal details
- Born: February 11, 1935 Rochester, New Hampshire, U.S.
- Died: April 19, 2023 (aged 88)
- Party: Republican
- Spouse: Franklin G. Torr
- Relatives: Ralph W. Torr (brother-in-law)

Ann M. Torr (February 11, 1935 – April 19, 2023) was an American politician. She served as a Republican member for the Strafford 6th and 12th district of the New Hampshire House of Representatives.

Torr died on April 19, 2023, at the age of 88.
