= Michael L. Grieco =

American politician

Member of the New Hampshire House of Representatives from the Rockingham 5th district
- In office 1976–1978

Personal details
- Born: Michael Louis Grieco; June 1, 1934 New York, U.S.
- Died: April 12, 2023 (aged 88) Fort Lauderdale, Florida, U.S.
- Party: Democratic

Michael Louis Grieco (June 1, 1934 – April 12, 2023) was an American politician. He served as a Democratic member for the Rockingham 5th district of the New Hampshire House of Representatives.

== Life and career ==
Grieco was born in New York, the son of Louis Grieco and Gertrude McDonald. He served on the USS Ingraham in the United States Navy.

Grieco served in the New Hampshire House of Representatives from 1976 to 1978.

== Death ==
Grieco died on April 12, 2023, at the Belmont Village Senior Living in Fort Lauderdale, Florida, at the age of 88.
