= Roy G. Saltman =

American electrical engineer

- Born: July 15, 1932; Manhattan, New York, U.S.
- Died: April 21, 2023 (aged 90); Rockville, Maryland, U.S.
- Education: Rensselaer Polytechnic Institute; Massachusetts Institute of Technology; Columbia University; American University
- Occupation: Electrical engineer

Roy G. Saltman (July 15, 1932 – April 21, 2023) was an American electrical engineer. He was known for being the United States Federal Government leading expert on computerized voting.

== Life and career ==
Saltman was born in Manhattan. He attended Rensselaer Polytechnic Institute, the Massachusetts Institute of Technology, Columbia University and the American University.

Saltman was a computer security specialist at the National Institute of Standards and Technology. In 1988 he published a report on computerized voting systems, warning that the use of punched-card ballots was subject to errors due to the fact that the paper punched out (known as a "chad") might remain partly attached to the card. This warning was largely ignored at the time, but the problem later became a key issue in the 2000 United States presidential election recount in Florida.

Saltman died on April 21, 2023 in Rockville, Maryland, at the age of 90.
