= Nikita Storojev =

Russian-American opera singer (1950–2023)

Nikita Leonidovich Storozhev (Russian: Никита Леонидович Сторожев; 1950 – 17 April 2023) was a Russian-American bass opera singer.

== Life ==
Storojev was born in 1950 in Harbin, China. His family moved back to Russia in 1955. He studied philosophy at the University of Sverdlovsk from 1970 to 1972, but then turned to music, studying voice at the Mussorgsky Conservatory of Yekaterinburg from 1972 to 1975, and then at the Moscow Conservatory from 1975 to 1978. Among his teachers were Ian Voutiras and renowned Russian bass Evgeny Nesterenko. Upon winning the prestigious Tchaikovsky Competition, he became principal soloist for five years in the Bolshoi Theatre and the Moscow Philharmonic Society.

Nikita Storojev performed in the world's major opera houses, concert halls and international festivals in Vienna, Paris, London, Milan, New York City, San Francisco, Florence, Munich, Tokyo, and Berlin. His vast repertoire consisted of over 50 operatic roles and more than 300 classical songs.

Storojev had twenty-five commercial CDs and five DVDs, performed and recorded under the direction of conductors such as Mstislav Rostropovich, Vladimir Ashkenazy, Sir John Pritchard, Claudio Abbado, Neeme Jarvi, John Nelson, Marius Jansons, Gennady Rozhdestvenski etc., and with singers such as Plácido Domingo, Luciano Pavarotti etc.

Nikita lived in Austin, Texas where he taught voice at the Butler School of Music at the University of Texas. While teaching at The University of Texas, his students won national competitions, participated in young artist programs, and began professional careers. As a teacher, Mr. Storojev also presented master classes around the world in Japan, Taiwan, Russia, Germany, France, Italy, and Mexico, as well as in the United States. Nikita travelled the world performing in various concerts and productions. Highlights of Mr. Storojev’s opera appearances included The Police Sergeant in Lady Macbeth of Mtsensk with San Francisco Opera, Teatro alla Scala, Opéra National de Paris, Opera Monte Carlo, and De Nederlandse Opera; the title role in Boris Godunov with the Komische Oper Berlin, Budapest Festival, and with the Orquesta Sinfónica Nacional de México; King Dodon in Tchaikovsky’s Le Coq d’Or with the Mariinsky Theatre; and Bedyai in Rimsky-Korsakov’s The Invisible City of Kitezh with De Nederlandse Opera.

Storojev died on 17 April 2023, at the age of 73.
