= Dennis Zuill =

Bermudian footballer

Personal information
- Date of birth: 3 January 1978 (age 48)
- Place of birth: Bermuda
- Position: Defender

Senior career*
Years	Team	Apps	(Gls)
2005–2007	Dandy Town Hornets		
2007	Bermuda Hogges	18	(0)
2011–2012	Dandy Town Hornets		

International career^{‡}
2006–2007	Bermuda	5	(0)
- * Club domestic league appearances and goals as of 22 December 2010 ‡ National team caps and goals as of 22 December 2010

Dennis Zuill (born 3 January 1978) is a Bermudian former international footballer who played as a defender.

== Club career ==
Zuill began his career as a defender with Dandy Town Hornets in the Bermudian Premier Division before joining the Bermuda Hogges in the USL Second Division in 2007 for its inaugural season in 2007.

He returned to Dandy Town Hornets after being released from prison in 2011.

== Personal life ==
Zuill was arrested in September 2009 in Atlanta for his involvement in cannabis and cocaine distribution and was sentenced to do time in prison. He was granted a supervised release from a New York prison in October 2011 after pleading guilty earlier in the year. In Bermuda, he was once more charged with drugs trafficking in March 2013.

He is a cousin of former national team striker Aljame Zuill.
