= Albert Podell =

American magazine editor and writer

Albert Podell (February 25, 1937 – April 9, 2023) was an American magazine editor and writer, advertising executive, trial attorney, and documentary film producer and director. Podell served as a good-government lobbyist and as a theatrical investor and producer.

== Career ==
=== Editor and writer ===
While in high school, Podell served as editor-in-chief of the Survey of Brooklyn Technical High School. He won two Columbia Scholastic Journalism gold keys for his paper as well as the Metcalfe Prize as the best scholastic feature/humor writer in New York State. He relocated to Chicago to become the graduate fellow of the Committee on International Relations at the University of Chicago, where he became an editor of the Chicago Review. When the University censored and suppressed an issue featuring Beat Generation writers, Podell resigned and became a founder of Big Table, a literature publication.

When the U.S. Post Office impounded and banned Big Table, as "obscene and filthy," Podell, with the help of the ACLU, won a landmark decision for freedom of expression in Big Table v. Schroeder, and his magazine became the nation's second-largest-circulation literary quarterly. In late 1959 Podell joined the editorial staff of Playboy, where he edited all non-fiction except jazz and cooking. He simultaneously reviewed books for the Chicago Sun-Times. In 1960 he left Playboy to edit six magazines for Publishers Development Corporation, and went on to write more than 250 articles for men's magazines, specializing in true-life adventure, sports, war, espionage, women, sex and exotic travel. After Army service, where he edited the official manual on how to build and where to locate latrines, Podell moved back to New York to become the picture story editor of Argosy, then the oldest continuously country's published magazine. In March 2015 St. Martin's Press published Podell's book Around The World in 50 Years: My Adventure to Every Country on Earth which became an immediate New York Times best seller, was reprinted in paperback in July 2016 and has been translated into five languages.

=== Adventurer ===
From 1964 to 1966 Podell was co-leader of the Trans-World Record Expedition, which made the longest, direct, non-repetitive automobile trip around the world. His book about this expedition, Who Needs A Road, is still in print after 48 years. In December 2012 Podell completed a five-decade mission to visit every country in the world and became, it is believed, the first American to achieve that goal. His book about this quest is titled Around the World in 50 Years: My Adventure to Every Country on Earth.

=== Advertising executive ===
After returning from his expedition, Podell joined the Don Kemper Advertising Agency and created a department specializing in motion picture advertising. He went on to become the creative director on the 20th Century Fox account and the account supervisor for Columbia Pictures. When CBS started Cinema Center Films, it hired Podell as its advertising manager. He served as the chairman of the Motion Picture Advertising Awards.

=== Good-government lobbyist ===
In 1971 Podell became the director of legislative operations for the Citizens Union in Albanv and an advocate for legislative reform, earning praise in the press as "the Ralph Nader of Albany." He was actively involved in supporting the No-Fault Auto Insurance law and the Warranty of Habitability. In 1974, Podell became the director of legislative operations for Common Cause in Albany, a position he held until accused by political anti-reformers of running a ring of teenage prostitutes in the State Legislature. Podell was eventually cleared of any wrongdoing by Mario Cuomo, then the New York Secretary of State, who investigated the matter. Podell proudly stated that he was the only person in the past century to be censured by the New York State Legislature – in what legal scholars dismiss as an unconstitutional bill of attainder.

=== Attorney ===
Podell was awarded a J.D. in 1976 from NYU School of Law, and joined the firm of Rosenman, Colin, Freund, Lewis, and Cohen, where he worked on the landmark case of Universal Pictures Studios v. Sony (464 U.s. 417. aka the Betamax Case), where he helped Sony win the right to sell the VCR and opened up the world of home video sales and usage. Podell then joined Fried, Frank, Harris, Shriver and Jacobson as a litigation specialist and never suffered a defeat in court. In 1981 he joined Milgrim, Thamajon, Jacobs and Lee to specialize in cases of intellectual property and copyright. From 1990 until he retired in 2006, Podell ran his own law firm and never lost a jury trial.

Podell says these careers have s common thread of "articulate advocacy." He states that "As a magazine editor you advocate that subscribers see the films and read the books and buy the clothes you recommend, in adverting you advocate that people buy your clients’ products, as a lobbyist you advocate that the legislature do the right thing, and as a trial attorney you advocate that the jury decide in favor of your client.”

=== Documentary producer and director ===
Podell formed Far Above Films in 1992, where he produced and directed three feature-length documentaries in music-video style: A Class Above, A Class on the Cutting Edge and Lift he Chorus, which won, respectively, bronze, silver and gold medals in national competitions. He worked for ten years on a Christmas Eve TV special.

=== Film ===
Podell served as executive producer of the films The Girl Next Door (2007) and The Woman (2011).

=== Theatrical production ===
Podell has been involved as an investor or producer of a dozen Broadway and off-Broadway shows. In 2012, he was the producer of The Great Society, which told the story of the presidency of Lyndon Johnson.

== Personal life ==
Albert Podell was born in Brooklyn on February 25, 1937. He received a BA in 1958 from Cornell University with a major in Political Science. From 1959 to 1960 he was a Graduate Fellow of the Committee on International Relations at the University of Chicago. He received a J.D. from the NYU School of Law in 1976. Podell was married, from 1969 to 1972 to actress and screenwriter, Stephanie Braxton. He married again, on December 12, 2012, to Russian journalist and writer Nadezda Dukhina. They divorced in December 2019. Podell had no children, but supported two in Africa. He died on April 9, 2023, at the age of 86.
