= Celedonia Jones =

American historian (1930–2023)

Celedonia Jones (February 21, 1930 – April 15, 2023) was an American historian. He was the Manhattan borough historian from 1997 to 2005.
