= Valérie Oka =

Ivorian artist and designer (1967–2023)

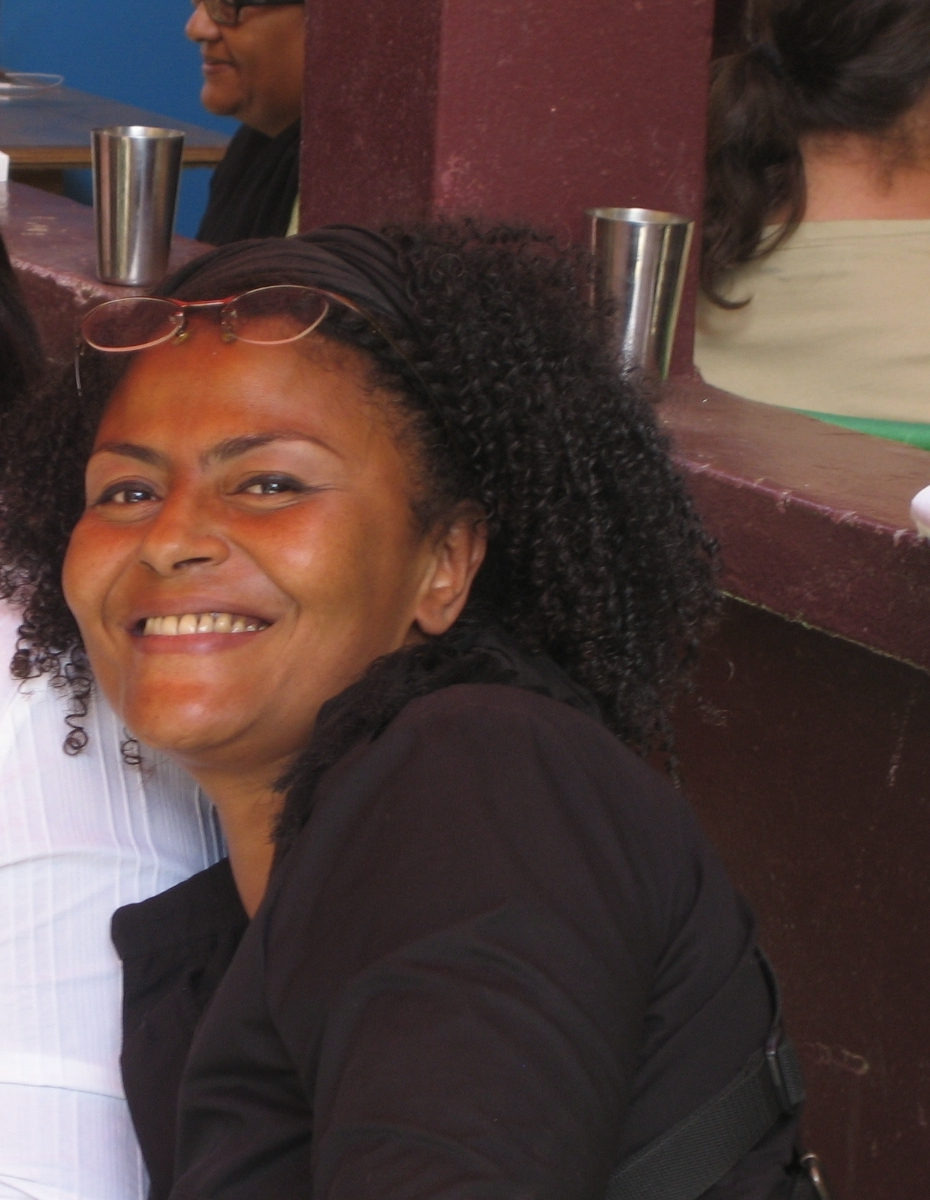
- Born: 22 January 1967; Abidjan, Ivory Coast
- Died: 8 April 2023 (aged 56)
- Education: Ecole supérieure d'arts graphiques de Paris
- Occupation: Artist

Valérie Oka (22 January 1967 – 8 April 2023) was an Ivorian artist and designer.

== Biography ==
Valérie Oka was born in 1967 in Abidjan, Ivory Coast, to a French mother and an Ivorian father. She left for France at the age of 8. In 1990, she graduated from the Ecole supérieure d'arts graphiques de Paris.

Oka worked in Paris until 1995 then returned to Africa as a designer, a relatively new activity at the time in Abidjan, communication consultant and professor of contemporary art at the Higher National Institute of Arts and Cultural Action. She received the European Union Prize at the Dakar Biennale in 2000. In 2003, she took part in the Boulev'art Festival, an event dedicated to the plastic arts in Cotonou, Benin in 2003 and was awarded the same year 2003 the Grand Prix from the Yehe Foundation, in the Ivory Coast. In 2006, she again participated in the Dakar Biennale, and that year was awarded the prize for best contemporary artist from the Union of Cultural Journalists of Côte d'Ivoire. From October 2007 to 2011, she worked for the Zuloga group on a cultural center dedicated to African art located in China. She then returned to Abidjan to live and work.

Oka died on 8 April 2023, at the age of 56.

== Artwork ==
Apart from her teaching, Valérie Oka's work mixes media in her creations: performances, installations, drawings, paintings, sculptures, furniture. Her work focuses on the foundations of human relationships: sexual and emotional intimacy, desire, violence, and communication. Her first exhibition in 1990 in London was followed by others in New York, Paris, Cologne, Beijing, Dakar, and Abdjan, as well as in Lagos and Brussels.

== Exhibitions ==
The Progress of Love was a performance piece shown at the Dakar Bienniale, which also traveled to the Centre for Contemporary Art, Lagos, Nigeria, the Menil Collection in Houston and the Pulitzer Foundation for the Arts in St. Louis. The installation examined the meaning of love in contemporary global society.

Body Talk was a 2015 group exhibition, bringing together 6 artists, which highlighted the beauty of the human body, illustrated by several performances captured on video. Valérie Oka organized it around a provocative theme: "You think that because I'm black I fuck better?" In particular, she deployed a black mannequin in a cage with a swing and a giant phallus.
