= Bennett L. Lewis =

American Army general (1926–2023)

Bennett Lewis
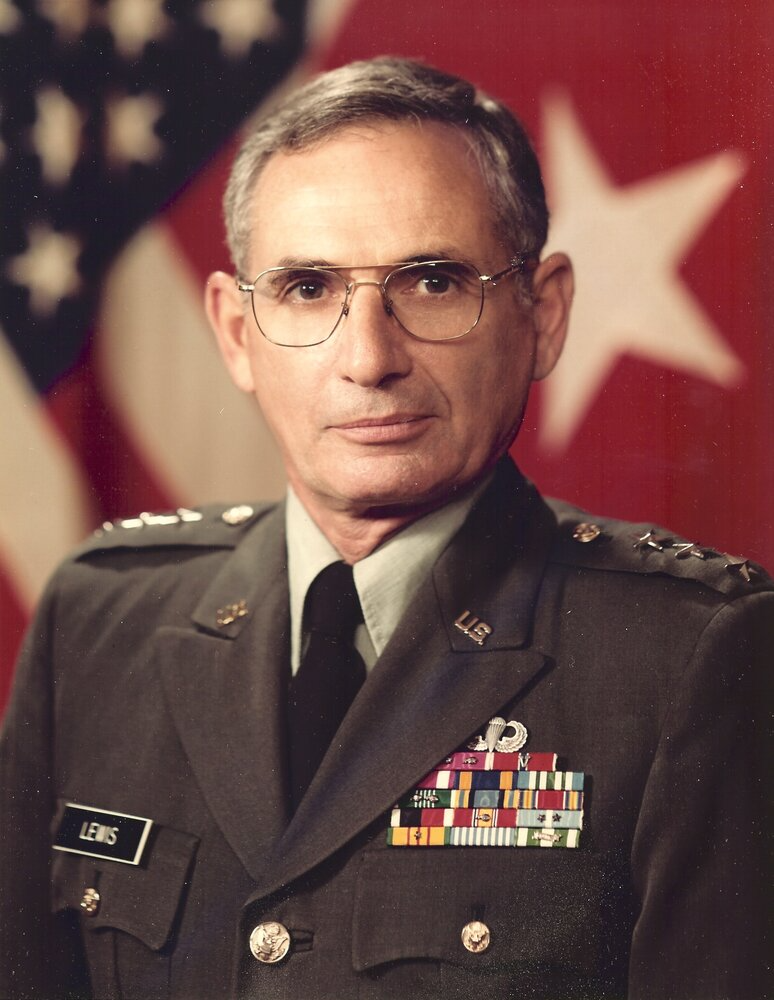
- Born: June 18, 1926; Boston, Massachusetts U.S.
- Died: April 5, 2023 (aged 96); Rockledge, Florida, U.S.
- Military career
- Allegiance: United States
- Branch: United States Army
- Service years: 1944–1945; 1950–1985
- Rank: Lieutenant general
- Nickname: Ben
- Unit: 14th Engineer Battalion
- Commands: Deputy Assistant Secretary of Defense, Mobilization
- Conflicts: World War II; Korean War; Vietnam War
- Awards: Distinguished Service Medal (2); Legion of Merit(3); Bronze Star Medal; Air Medal

Bennett Leonard Lewis (June 18, 1926 – April 5, 2023) was a lieutenant general in the United States Army who served as Deputy Assistant Secretary of Defense, Mobilization and Director, Defense Mobilization Systems Planning Activity. He graduated from the United States Military Academy in 1950 with a B.S. degree in military science. He later earned an M.S. degree in civil engineering from Harvard University in 1955. He held the Pentagon post from 1982 until 1985.

== Military career ==
Lewis served in the Army as an enlisted soldier in 1944 and 1945 and returned to it as an officer after graduating from West Point in 1950. He commanded the 14th Engineer Combat Battalion in Vietnam in 1968, and from 1970 to 1973 the Mobility Equipment Research and Development Center. From 1982 to 1985 he was Deputy Assistant Secretary of Defense for mobilization, the post for which he received two awards of the Army Distinguished Service Medal.

His military honors include the Distinguished Service Medal and three awards of the Legion of Merit. The citations for two of the Legion of Merit awards record his command of the 14th Engineer Combat Battalion in 1968 and of the Mobility Equipment Research and Development Center from 1970 to 1973.

Lewis died in Rockledge, Florida on April 5, 2023, at the age of 96.
