= Ronald Bradley =

British professor (1929–2023)

Ronald Duncan Bradley (8 July 1929–26 April 2023) was a British professor of medicine, considered to be a pioneer of intensive care medicine.

== Biography ==
Born in London, England, Bradley completed his medical education at St Thomas' in 1955 and served there until 1994.

Bradley was the first full-time intensive care doctor in the U.K. In 1966, Bradley was appointed to lead the first intensive care unit at St Thomas', where he introduced a pulmonary artery catheter. In 1974, he and his colleagues published a review of their experience and observations. In 1989, he was named the UK's first professor of intensive care. Over his tenure, Bradley guided 170 senior house officers, with over 20 advancing to professorships.

In addition to his work in cardiac care, Bradley developed renal support techniques and methods for intravenous liver biopsies. He also adapted early BBC computers for clinical monitoring. His research resulted in the publication of the book Studies in Acute Heart Failure. Awards recognizing his work include the Moxon Medal in 1993 and the Fothergillian Medal in 2017.

He died of an intracranial hemorrhage at the age of 93.
