= Art Uytendaal =

Australian equestrian (1931–2023)

Adrianus "Art" Uytendaal (21 January 1931 – 22 April 2023) was a Dutch-born Australian equestrian.

== Biography ==
Adrianus Uytendaal was born in Holland on 21 January 1931. He immigrated to Australia in January 1956. Uytendaal was one of seventeen surviving children, coming from an equestrian family in Breda. As a professional in his homeland, he decided to spend two years in Australia as an assisted migrant, returning as an amateur, but ended up staying permanently. He was one of the first riders to use the 'European' style in Australia and introduced dressage as the basis of show jumping.

From 1956 to 1990, Uytendaal's list of wins numbered in the thousands in Australia. He was the first sponsored rider in the country as part of the Kevin Dennis Show Jumping Team and also riding for Johnny Walker Whisky. His wins include three Australian Show Jumping Championships, Victorian Championships, Showjumper of the Year awards, and many Puissance records.

Horses that he trained or rode include Solo, Bencubbin, Donald, Madison Square, Powder, Trafalgar Square, Leal, Chatter, Gentleman, Brahmin, Tongala, Jamaica Inn, Mr. Kevin, Mr. Dennis, Wanganella, Autograph, Koyuna, Dixieland, Johnny Walker Whisky, Mr. Ed, Duell Bug, Duell Roy and Man of Gold (who competed for Japan at the 2000 Sydney Olympics.)

Uytendaal was the first to jump 1 m 93 cm (3 ft 1 in) in a Puissance in Australia and in 1969 he jumped 2 m 17 cm (6 1/2 in) on Chatter, a record he held until the rules were changed and the wall could include hay bales in front of it.

Uytendaal would have qualified to ride at five Olympic Games, but as a professional he was ineligible. His horse Mr. Dennis finished 5th at the Montreal Olympics ridden by Guy Creighton, and Autograph ridden by Geoff McVean finished 4th at the alternate Olympics in Rotterdam. His first wife Marianne Uytendaal (later Gilchrist) was an accomplished rider representing Australia on numerous occasions. In 1976 he took two young horses to the UK - Tongala and Jamaica Inn where they both won and placed in shows, qualifying for the Horse of the Year Show. Unfortunately Art became injured and returned home.

Uytendaal was the Australian coach of the World Eventing Championships in Gawler, South Australia, and was nominated coach for the ill-fated Moscow Olympics and the Los Angeles Olympics.

Uytendaal died on 22 April 2023, at the age of 92.
