= Inés Sánchez =

Cuban-Costa Rican journalist (1931–2023)

- Born: Inés Aleida Sánchez Guarde; 11 June 1931; Havana, Cuba
- Died: 7 April 2023 (aged 91); San José, Costa Rica
- Occupation: Journalist
- Employers: Repretel; Teletica
- Spouse: Ernesto Revuelta Milán (d. 2011)
- Children: 3
- Awards: Order of the Rising Sun (2012)

Inés Aleida Sánchez Guarde de Revuelta (11 June 1931 – 7 April 2023) was a Cuban-Costa Rican journalist. She was the host of the television program Teleclub, a position she has held since its premiere in 1963. She was recognized by Guinness World Records as the longest-serving presenter of an educational television program.

== Biography ==
Inés Sánchez was born in Havana on 11 June 1931. She studied journalism and audiovisual production, and made some appearances on radio and television. Due to censorship after the Cuban Revolution, she emigrated to Costa Rica with her husband and eldest daughter in 1961.

A journalist must have her hands free to take the microphone and say what she thinks she should say, but suddenly there was no more freedom to speak. They told us what we had to say and made us go dressed as militia members. So I complained, and although they offered to increase my salary, I explained that it was not about that, but that they let me say what I thought I should say.

Sánchez initially worked for Radio Monumental's news program, and later joined Las Estrellas se reúnen. She became the host of Teleclub, an educational television program which debuted on 8 February 1963. It was aimed at stay-at-home parents, with segments on cooking, sewing, health, nutrition, and beauty, as well as news. According to Sánchez, Teleclub succeeded because it met the need for a family-oriented program which Costa Rican television had been lacking.

It was first broadcast on Canal 4, then moved to Teletica Canal 7, followed by Repretel Canal 6, Canal 2, Canal 4 until 2002, and Canal 13 until 2015. It is currently broadcast by Televisora de Costa Rica on Teletica XPERTV Canal 33.

On 21 January 2002, the program was interrupted when Sánchez suffered a life-threatening heart attack. She recovered and returned to hosting on 2 May.

As of 2010, more than 13,000 hours of Teleclub had been broadcast.

== Personal life and death ==
Sánchez had three daughters and four grandchildren. Her husband, Ernesto Revuelta Milán, died in 2011. Sánchez died on 7 April 2023, at the age of 91.

== Awards and recognition ==
In August 2005, Inés Sánchez was presented with a recognition from the government of Japan for her dissemination of Japanese culture through Teleclub's segments on ikebana, origami, and cuisine. In December 2012, she received the Order of the Rising Sun, Gold and Silver Rays.

Sánchez holds two Guinness world records – for longest running television educational show and longest career as a presenter of an educational television program.

In February 2019, she received the International Award for Television Excellence from the Hispano-World Writers' Union.
