= Bob Vidler =

Australian cricketer (1957–2023)

Personal information
- Full name: Robert Vidler
- Born: 5 February 1957; Cronulla, New South Wales, Australia
- Died: 14 April 2023 (aged 66)
- Source: ESPNcricinfo, 5 February 2017

Robert Vidler (5 February 1957 – 14 April 2023) was an Australian cricketer. He played four first-class matches for New South Wales between 1977–78 and 1978–79.

Vidler died from motor neuron disease on 14 April 2023, at the age of 66.

== See also ==
- List of New South Wales representative cricketers
