= I Ketut Wiana =

Indonesian Hindu scholar (1945–2023)

Dr. I Ketut Wiana (14 September 1945 – 19 April 2023) was an Indonesian Hindu scholar, widely regarded as one of the leading authorities on Agama Hindu Dharma, the officially recognized form of Hinduism in Indonesia.

Wiana died in Denpasar on 19 April 2023, at the age of 77 following long-term illness.

== Career ==
In his active career, Wiana was a writer for Bali Post's Hindu Religion column, and also for several magazines on issues relating to Hinduism. He wrote several books on Hinduism and was once a lecturer at the Denpasar State Hindu Dharma Institute. He frequently gave lectures on Hinduism, and made regular appearances on radio and television programs. Wiana served as the vice-secretary general at the Parisadha Hindu Dharma Indonesia.

== Advocacy ==
Wiana urged Balinese to not sacrifice turtles in puja and to follow Indonesian regulations on protecting the Sea Turtles, citing the Vedas.

== Works ==
- Suksmaning Banten
- Beragama pada zaman kali (Eng. Religion in the Kali Era)
- Caste in Hinduism
- Tri Hita Karana According to Hindu Concepts
