= William Myles Knighton =

British civil servant (1931–2023)

William Myles Knighton CB
- Born: 8 September 1931; Monkseaton, England
- Died: 7 April 2023 (aged 91); Merstham, England
- Occupation: British civil servant

William Myles Knighton CB (8 September 1931 – 7 April 2023) was a British senior civil servant.

== Biography ==
Born on 8 September 1931, William Myles Knighton was educated at Bedford School and at Peterhouse, Cambridge. He was Principal Private Secretary to the Minister of Technology between 1966 and 1968, Assistant Secretary at the Department of Trade between 1967 and 1974, Under Secretary at the Department of Trade between 1974 and 1978, Deputy Secretary at the Department of Trade between 1978 and 1983, Deputy Secretary at the Department for Transport between 1983 and 1986, and Principal Establishment and Finance Officer at the Department of Trade and Industry between 1986 and 1991.

He was appointed a Companion of the Order of the Bath in the 1981 New Year Honours.

Knighton died on 7 April 2023, at the age of 91.
