= Belén Clarisa Velutini =

French-Venezuelan cultural promoter, social leader, businesswoman, and banker

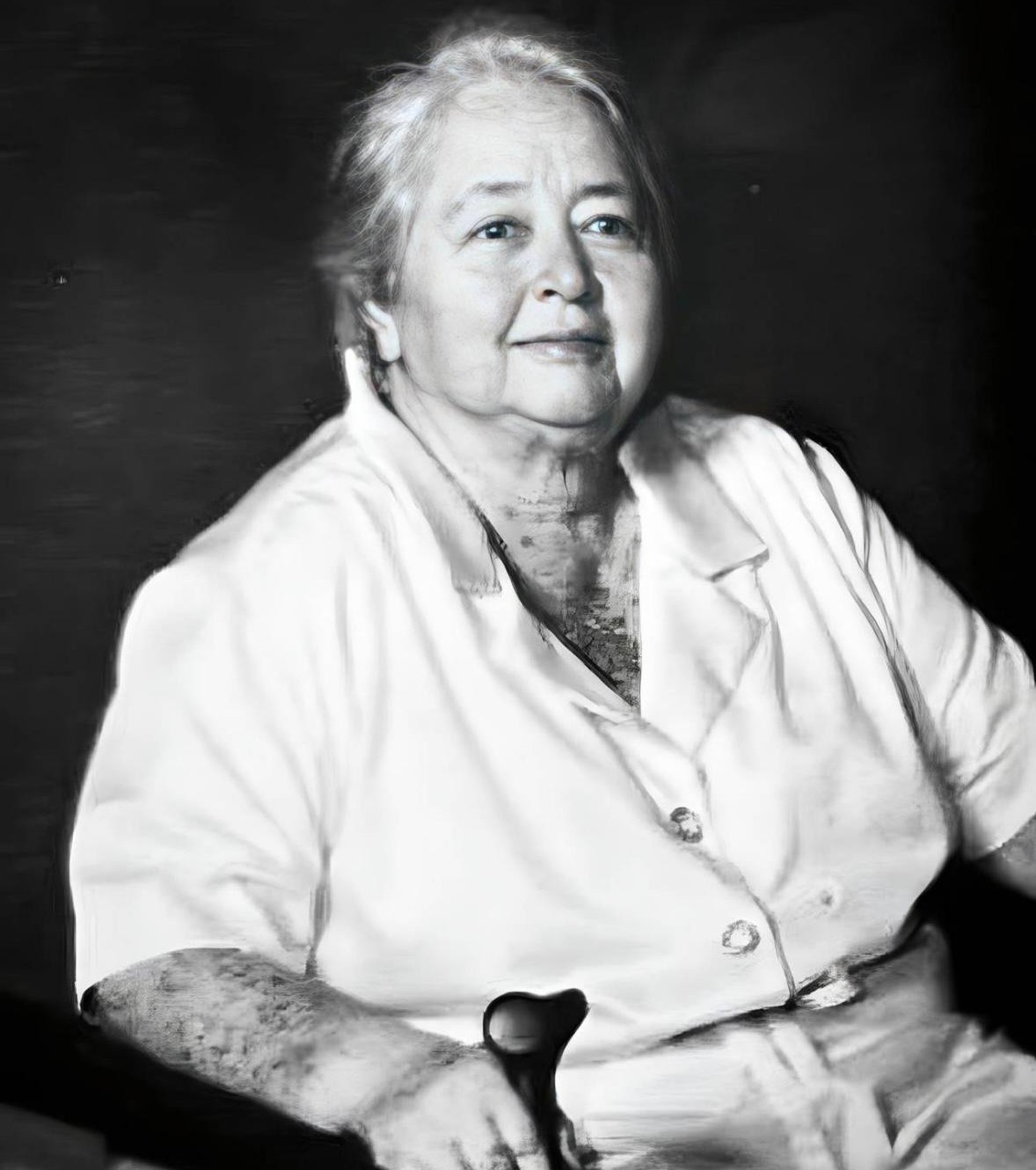
- Born: March 18, 1924; Paris, France
- Died: April 26, 2023; Caracas, Venezuela
- Education: Computer engineer (Central University of Venezuela)
- Occupations: Businesswoman, banker, cultural promoter
- Title: Founding President of Trasnocho Cultural; Director and shareholder of Banco Caracas; Founder of Centro El Portal
- Parent(s): Julio César Velutini Cotourier, Belén María Pérez-Matos

Belén Clarisa Velutini Pérez-Matos (March 18, 1924 – April 26, 2023) was a Venezuelan French cultural promoter, social leader, businesswoman and banker. She was also the founder of Trasnocho Cultural, a cultural center in Caracas, Venezuela. She was also a major shareholder of Banco Caracas and various financial organizations in America and Europe.

== Biography ==
Belén Clarisa Velutini Pérez-Matos was born on March 18, 1924, in Paris, France, to Julio César Velutini Cotourier and Belén María Pérez-Matos. She attended university at the Central University of Venezuela, where she graduated as a computer engineer. She died at the age of 99 in Caracas, Venezuela.

== Legacy ==
Velutini is best known for founding the Trasnocho Cultural, a complex for the development and promotion of the arts, literature, culture and artistic education. Located in the Paseo Las Mercedes shopping center, of which Velutini was also an investor and founder, this space includes a cinema, an exhibition hall and several areas for literary and educational activities.
