= Rami Meir =

Israeli artist, poet and singer (1962–2023)

Rami Meir Ра́ми Ме́ир
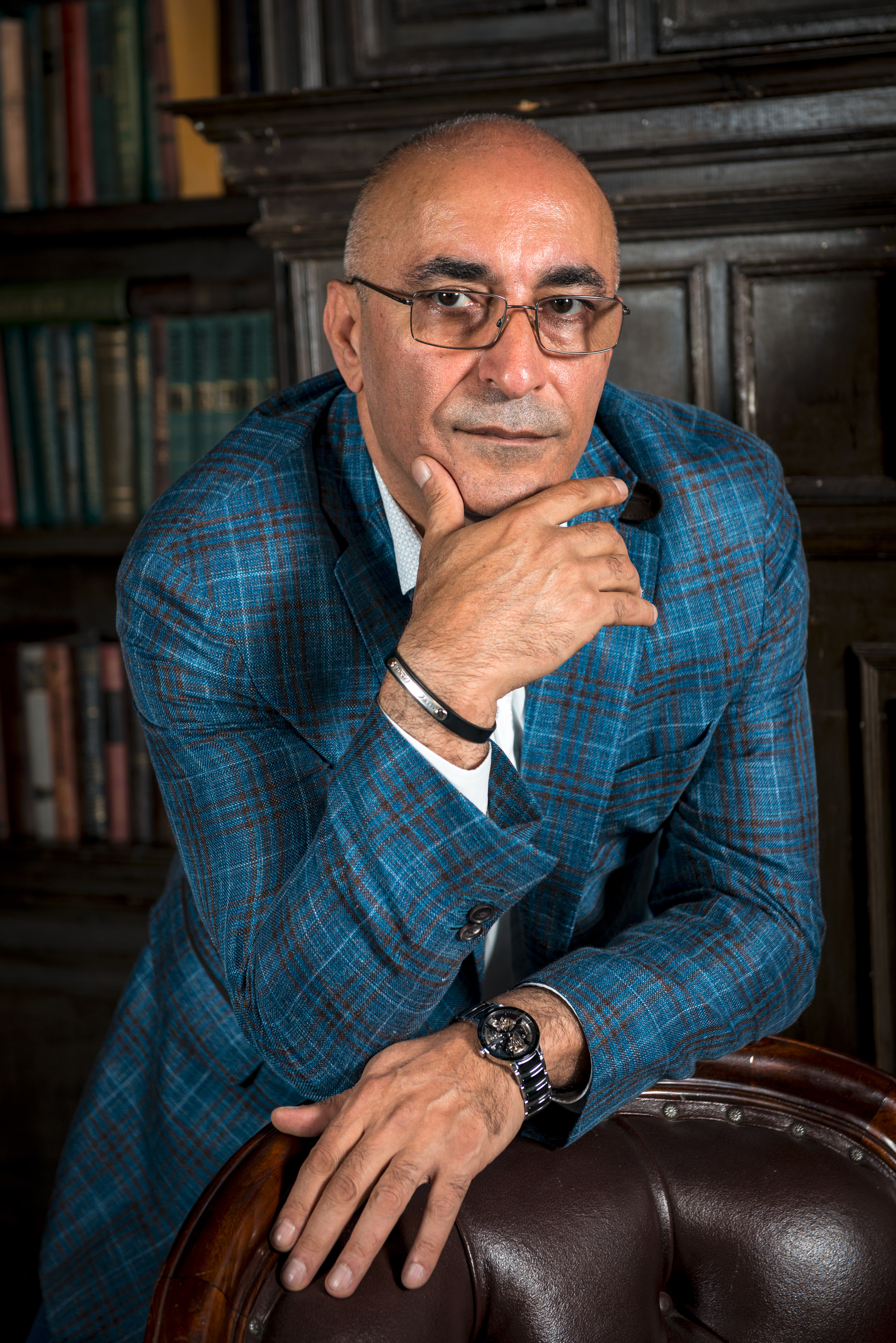
- Born: Rahamim Nuvahovich Migirov; 11 April 1962; Baku, Azerbaijan SSR, USSR
- Died: 7 April 2023 (aged 60); Moscow, Russia Israel (1990–) Russia ()
- Style: In music – chanson, contemporary romance; In painting – realism, symbolism, impressionism
- Elected: Chairman of Russia's Mountain Jewish Union of Artists, Member of Israel's Mountain Jewish Union of Writers, Member of Israel's Mountain Jewish Union of Artists
- Website: ramimeir.com

Rámi Méir (Russian: Ра́ми Ме́ир, Hebrew: רמי מאיר; né Rahamim Novakovich Migirov; 11 April 1962 – 8 April 2023) was a Soviet-born Israeli visual artist, poet, singer, and author of song lyrics, idioms and parables. Meir was the chairman of Russia's Mountain Jewish Union of Artists.

== Early years ==
Rami Meir was born to a Mountain Jewish family on 11 April 1962, in Baku, the capital of the Azerbaijan Soviet Socialist Republic (now Azerbaijan).

== Painting ==
=== Styles and features in painting ===
Meir employed a painting style involving elements of realism, symbolism, and impressionism, with his works featuring symbolic features and unique characters within an otherwise mundane context. Meir claimed to have employed this artistic style intending to share his life experience and accumulated knowledge about the world with his audience, including his beliefs in regard to the role of human beings in the universe.

Meir worked within a figurative style of painting, developing his own artistic language involving the use of three-dimensional strokes influenced by classical methods in combination with glazing. Meir referred to this, a 'golden stroke'. When painting, he had a tendency to saturate the canvas with a range of bright colours with the intent of imparting a sense of positivity. This leads some to consider Meir as one of the most prominent figures in contemporary art in both Russia and Israel.

Jewish studies and culture are major themes in Meir' artwork. With the help of historical records, old postcards and photos, he explored the industrial arts, everyday life and traditional clothing of Mountain Jews from the Caucasus and South Caucasus regions in a unique series of paintings called Mountain Jews.

=== 3D strokes ===
An innovative approach in Meir's art was the hidden use of ЗD strokes when making paintings, resulting from being educated as an engraver of artistic goods and jewelry.

Meir developed a unique technique of "golden strokes" and introduced it into his painting process. This technique represented a sort of performance art.

=== Golden stroke ===
A crucial part of Meir's paintings is the way of "golden stroke founding" before beginning each one. The symbolism of the word "to find" captures the essence that the artist makes on canvas with the first stroke. According to Meir, the first stroke of each painting finds the content of the artwork and "fills it with living spirit". A key part of this technique is that the "golden stroke" must be made by a woman.

== Music ==
Rami Meir took a great interest in music during his school years. When he was 11 years old, he started taking guitar and piano lessons at one of Baku's musical workshops. At the same age, he began writing poetry and made his first attempts to set them to music. He made his career as a lyricist and singer in his later years.

Meir released two studio albums in collaboration with Igor Timakov, a musician and composer. They were working on their third record in 2020.

== Special project: postcards with paintings ==
At the end of 2019, Meir introduced a series of 21 postcards with prints of his paintings. Some parts represent the faces, handicrafts and clothing of Azerbaijan's Mountain Jews. The back side of the postcards contain fragments from parables and idioms by Meir. The author explained: "I wish people would send postcards all over again! And through these postcards, I want to make people have warm feelings and understanding of one thing: the dear and loved should be appreciated during their lifetime. I could help them express that wonderful feeling that they have inside them."

== Creativity ==
=== Reviews ===
A presentation of Meir's Hudo Kumek! Tiro Kumek! (God speed you! Torah speed you!) album as well as an exhibition of his paintings took place at the Radisson Collection Hotel (Hotel Ukraina, Moscow) in 2019. The event was attended by Moscow's elite of Azerbaijani and Mountain Jewish ethnicities. Nisu Nisuev, an artist and member of the Moscow Union of Artists, thinks that "Rami Meir is a very multifarious person. A lot of his works have something in common with the style of the first impressionists. The artist skillfully conveys his wealth of life experience into the language of fine art. His Mountain Jews series of paintings is particularly impressive. Efrem Amiramov, a singer, mentioned: "Rami is a man of great talent. He is a poet, singer and artist. I'm inspired by everything he creates." Garri Kanaev, a music maker, stated: "All what we saw and listened, performed by our friend Rami Meir at Hotel Ukraina in Moscow, is a real feast of creative work."

=== Goals of creativity ===
On the goals of his creativity, Meir said, "I want to embellish the lives of others, to give them the light. I don't only mean the top layer of joy and impression out of nice image and well-done job, the main goal is very integral: to reflect how wonderful the world around us, how heavenly everything around us. It happens when a person comes up to the painting and sees that it lights up with a kind of internal warmth, which is put into the canvas by the artist. The energy of painting is the energy of artist. It makes you smile and feel the excitement of joy, it brings positive thoughts to your mind".

== Lost works ==
Meir served in the Soviet Army. Having discovered his professional qualification, his ship commander introduced a new appointment called regimental engraver. In these two years of military service, he created about 40 unique objects of art. However, in 1983, the majority of those artworks were irretrievably lost during transport to the all-union exhibition held at the VDNH (Exhibition of Achievements of National Economy).

== Personal life and death ==
Meir died on 8 April 2023, at the age of 60 in Moscow.

== Honours ==
Meir was elected as the chairman of Russia's Mountain Jewish Union of Artists.

== Sources ==
- Major forms, themes and motifs of the creativity of Rami Meir by Natalia Ivanova, PhD in Political Science, Winner of Tvardovsky National Literary Award Новости «Основные направления, темы и мотивы творчества Rami Meir» от автора Rami Meir
- Review of artworks by Rami Meir (an Israeli artist of Russian origin) by Vera Pereyatenets, fine art expert (certified by the Ministry of culture of the Russian Federation with the right to report on works of painting, graphics and applied art (17–20 centuries, Russia) Новости «Рецензия на творчество Rami Meir искусствоведа-эксперта В. И. Переятенец» от автора Rami Meir
