= Joe Cattini =

British World War II veteran

Joe Cattini Legion of Honour
- Born: Alberto Giuseppe Antonio Cattini; 17 January 1923; London
- Died: 18 April 2023 (aged 100); Stowmarket, Suffolk
- Occupation: D-Day veteran
- Spouses: Mary Honan (m. 1949; died 1998) Frances Gudge (m. 1998; died 2018)
- Children: 3
- Awards: Legion of Honour – (2016)

Alberto Giuseppe Antonio Cattini (17 January 1923 – 18 April 2023), known as Joe Cattini, was a British soldier who came to prominence in his nineties as a veteran of the Normandy landings in World War II and a leading campaigner for the British Normandy Memorial. At his death, shortly after his 100th birthday, he was believed to be one of only around half a dozen veterans left who fought on 6 June 1944.

== Early life ==
The eldest of four brothers, Cattini was born in London to a family of café owners from Tuscany, Italy. He grew up in Hampstead.

== Second World War ==
He joined the army in 1941 and landed on Gold Beach on D-Day as a bombardier with the 86th Field Regiment of the Hertfordshire Yeomanry. ′They laid carpets down so we didn't sink into the sand,′ he told The Times seven decades later. ′There were bodies floating in the sea and on the beach. I had been in the civil defence reserve during the Blitz in London so it didn't faze me, but the stench and carnage was terrible.′

== Post-war life ==
After demobilisation, he returned to his career as an electrician. It was only in the last nine years of his life, prompted by the 70th anniversary of D-Day, that he joined veterans groups and became a familiar figure at memorial events.

In 2016 he was awarded France's highest honour, the Legion of Honour, in recognition of his part in the liberation of France.

From 2019, he was an ambassador for the £30 million memorial to the 22,442 people who died under British command on D-Day and at the Battle of Normandy, which was unveiled in Ver-sur-Mer, Normandy in 2021. He was adamant that the teenage soldiers who cried for their mothers before dying on the beaches should be remembered. 'I pray for their souls every day,' he told the BBC.

== Family ==
He married his first wife Mary in 1949. They had three children, Dominic, Frances and Marian. After Mary's death in 1998 he married his second wife, Frances, and moved with her to New Zealand. After her death he settled in Eastleigh, Hampshire.

== Funeral ==
His funeral in Bury St Edmunds was attended by the British ambassador to Italy and Nicholas Witchell, a founding trustee of the British Normandy Memorial, who described him as ′a giant within the Normandy veteran community′.
