= Gail D. Fosler =

US economic forecaster (1947–2023)

Gail D. Fosler (December 7, 1947 – April 2, 2023) was president of The GailFosler Group, a strategic advisory service for global business leaders and public policymakers, and a prominent economic forecaster. Fosler was a public speaker and her opinions and analysis were frequently quoted within both domestic and international publications.

Fosler was twice named America’s most accurate economic forecaster by The Wall Street Journal.

A range of policymakers, businesspeople, and fellow economists were known to read her analysis.

== Early life ==
Fosler received her B.A. in economics from the University of Southern California and her M.B.A. in finance from New York University.

== Career ==
Fosler was a former president and trustee of The Conference Board. From 1989-2008, Fosler served as chief economist of The Conference Board and was president from October 2007 to December 2009. In 2004, she assumed responsibility as executive vice president for expanding the international presence and operations of The Conference Board.

Prior to her time at The Conference Board, Fosler served as deputy staff director and chief economist of the United States Senate Committee on the Budget. Fosler developed frameworks and forecasts for congressional budget debates and acted as a key negotiator on fiscal, monetary, and budget process initiatives for the committee.

She was a past director of Shire plc, Baxalta Incorporated, Swiss Re America Holding Corp., Caterpillar Inc., Baxter International and DBS Holdings (Singapore), among others, and a past trustee of John Hancock Mutual Funds.

She was a member of The Council on Foreign Relations and the Bretton Woods Committee, and a former trustee and Executive Committee member of the National Bureau of Economic Research. She was an affiliated expert for the Information Technology and Innovation Foundation and served as a member of the Bipartisan Policy Center’s Commission on Retirement Security and Personal Savings.

She served on the Advisory Panel to the Federal Reserve Bank of New York, the Chatham House Gold Task Force and as a trustee of The Economic Club of New York. She also chaired the board of directors of the Deschner Corporation, a family-owned manufacturer of hydraulic speed controls and related equipment for industry in Santa Ana, California.

== Death ==
Fosler died on April 2, 2023.
