= Letty Eisenhauer =

American visual and performance artist (1935–2023)

Letty Lou Eisenhauer (May 30, 1935 – April 25, 2023) was an American visual and performance artist known for her free-spirited Fluxus performances during the 1960s. She was on faculty at the Borough of Manhattan Community College as a counselor, professor, and forensic psychologist.

⁰==Biography== Eisenhauer was born in Brooklyn, New York on May 30, 1935, to Charlotte Itzen Eisenhauer and Frances Eisenhauer. She attended Ramsey High School in New Jersey.

She was an undergraduate at Douglass College from 1953 to 1957, when she received her Bachelor of Arts degree and was a graduate student and department secretary in the M.F.A. program from 1961 to 1962. She studied art primarily with Robert Watts. She befriended Geoff Hendricks and Roy Lichtenstein, both of whom were teaching art at Douglass College at the time. She also posed for Lichtenstein.

Watts introduced her to Allan Kaprow, who persuaded her to perform in his Spring Happening, her first performance. She continued to perform in Happenings throughout the 1960s, often appearing nude or scantily clad. In 1964 she was a participant in Wolf Vostells Happening, You.

After graduating from Douglas, Eisenhauer moved to Paris, France where she worked in the editing department of a fashion magazine. On returning to the states in the 60's, Letty acted in many of the "Happenings" in New York City, her best known performance being "The Tart, or Miss America" written by Dick Higgins. She was also featured in Higgins' only feature-length film "The Flaming City (1962)."

She simultaneously pursued a career in the visual arts, exhibiting sculptures, prints, and paintings, many of which were informed by a Pop sensibility.

She went on to study Forensic Psychology eventually becoming a professor, counselor, and forensic psychologist for many years at Borough of Manhattan Community College in New York City.

She established an artists' residence, in Lehigh Valley, Pennsylvania. She traveled several times to Africa volunteering with Habitat for Humanity. Her common-law husband was David Becker.

Letty Eisenhauer died on April 25, 2023, at the age of 87.

== Selected performances ==
- Spring Happening, by Kaprow. Performed at the Reuben Gallery.
- Courtyard, by Kaprow. Performed at the Greenwich (or Mills) Hotel on Bleecker Street in November, 1962.
- The First and Second Wilderness, by Michael Kirby. Performed during the Yam Festival, at Smolin Gallery, NYC, May 27, 1963. Letty Eisenhauer wrote cheers and performed them as a cheerleader for a Civil War-inspired live action board game.
- BLINK, Rolf Nelson Gallery, Los Angeles in 1963. Eisenhauer modeled collaborative creations by Alison Knowles, George Brecht, and Watts.
- Whipped Cream Piece (Lick Piece), by Ben Patterson. Performed during Fully Guaranteed 12 Fluxus Concerts at Fluxhall in 1964 in New York City.
- Orange, by Kaprow. Performed in 1964.
- Tart, or Miss America, by Dick Higgins, 1965, Queens boxing arena. This piece was dedicated to Eisenhauer who also performed in it.
- Washes, by Claes Oldenburg, May 1965. In this piece Eisenhauer, covered with balloons, floated motionless on her back in a swimming pool, while a man bit the balloons and exploded them.

== Bibliography ==
1. Sid Sachs and Kalliopi Minioudaki, Seductive Subversion: Women Pop Artists, 1958-1968. Philadelphia, PA: University of the Arts, Philadelphia, 2010.
2. Cheryl Harper, A Happening Place. Philadelphia: The Jewish Community Centers of Greater Philadelphia, 2003.
3. David McCabe, A Year in the Life of Andy Warhol. New York: Phaidon, 2003.
4. John Marter, ed. Off Limits: Rutgers University and the Avant-Garde, 1957-1963. New Brunswick, NJ and London: The Newark Museum, Newark, NJ and Rutgers University Press, 1999.
5. Jon Hendricks, Fluxus Codex. New York: Harry N. Abrams, 1988.
6. Dick Higgins, "The Tart, or Miss America," in TDR (Tulane Drama Review), ed. Richard Schechner and Michael Kirby (special issue eds.), 10, no. 2 (Winter 1965): 132–141.
