= Roger Lise =

Martiniquais politician (1927–2023)

Roger Lise (26 July 1927 – 26 April 2023) was a politician from Martinique who was elected to the French Senate in 1977.
