= Doris Gregory =

Canadian author (1921–2023)

Doris Gregory (née Filmer-Bennett; 9 April 1921 – 26 April 2023) was a Canadian author and activist. She was known for her role ending gender-based segregation in Canadian universities.

== Life and career ==
Gregory studied English at the University of British Columbia in the early 1940s. At the time, many courses were segregated by gender, with separate courses with female lecturers for female students. Gregory organized a group of women to "crash" one of the men's lectures. After being asked to leave the class, Gregory wrote a story about the incident for the student paper, the Ubyssey. The story was republished by the Canadian University Press, and the women were allowed to join the men's lecture.

Gregory dropped out of university to join the Canadian Women's Army Corps in 1942, and was stationed in London and Farmborough. An autobiography about her experiences, titled How I Won the War For the Allies: One Sassy Canadian Soldier's Story, was published by Ronsdale Press in June 2014.

Gregory died on 26 April 2023, at the age of 102.
