= Tea Petrin =

Slovenian economist, politician, and diplomat (1944–2023)

Slovenian Ambassador to the Netherlands
- In office 2004–2008
- Prime Minister: Anton Rop; Janez Janša

Minister of Economic Affairs
- In office 2000–2004
- Prime Minister: Janez Drnovšek; Anton Rop

Personal details
- Born: 9 July 1944 Celje, Yugoslavia (now Slovenia)
- Died: 4 April 2023 (aged 78)

Tea Petrin (9 July 1944 – 4 April 2023) was a Slovenian economist, politician and diplomat. She was the Minister for Economic Affairs from 2000 to 2004, and she served as the Slovenian Ambassador to the Netherlands from 2004 to 2008. Petrin was a professor of economics at the University of Ljubljana.

== Early life and education ==
Tea Petrin was born in Celje, Yugoslavia, on 9 July 1944. She studied economics at the University of Ljubljana, where she graduated in 1969, and she earned a Master of Economics from Louisiana State University in the United States in 1971. She returned to the University of Ljubljana for her doctorate in economics, which she earned in 1981.

== Career ==
In 1986, Petrin co-founded the Yugoslav General Entrepreneurial Agency (YUGEA) with fellow economists Janez Prašnikar and Aleš Vahčič. The organization was created with a government mandate to improve industry in Yugoslavia. The group concluded that the implementation of economic competition was necessary to restore the Yugoslav economy, and they proposed creating several smaller firms to compete with the primary state-owned firms. Petrin traveled with YUGEA to assist workers in creating spin-off firms.

Petrin was a founding member of the private entrepreneurship school GEA College in 1990. She began teaching at the University of Ljubljana as an assistant professor, where she created a master's program for entrepreneurship studies in 1991. She became a full professor in 1993. Petrin's primary academic focus was economic competition and innovation economics, including her study of socialist economics and its challenges in regulating firm sizes without competition. She was also involved with the International Bank for Reconstruction and Development's work in Slovenia.

Petrin was appointed Minister for Economic Affairs in the government of Janez Drnovšek in November 2000, and she held the position through the government of Anton Rop until April 2004. She resigned from the ministry to become the Slovenian Ambassador to the Netherlands in 2004. She held the position until 2008.

== Death ==
The University of Ljubljana's economics department confirmed that Petrin had died on 4 April 2023, at age 78.
