= Suicide of Samarveer Singh =

Suicide of an Indian academic

Samarveer Singh
- Born: 7 October 1990
- Died: 26 April 2023 (aged 33); New Delhi
- Cause of death: Suicide
- Education: Hindu College (MPhil)
- Occupation: Professor of Philosophy

Samarveer Singh was an Indian academic who worked as an assistant professor on ad-hoc basis at the Hindu College in the Delhi University. After working for seven years at the college, he was asked to vacate his position in February 2023 after an arbitrary and highly opaque '2-minute interview', replacing the permanent position with reportedly less-qualified applicants. Described as being 'deeply distressed' about his family's financial situation after being removed from his job, Samarveer died by suicide on 26 April 2023. His suicide has since sparked the debate on the arbitrary selection process of the university and highlighted the exploitation of ad-hoc workers in India.

== Protest ==
The teacher's death has sparked outrage among students, activists, and teachers who have accused the university of "institutional murder", alleging that he was driven to it as he was expecting to get permanent and instead lost his job. They claimed that the university's decision to remove Samarveer from his job was callous and insensitive, and that it has put a strain on the mental health of many teachers. Students held a protest organized by the All India Students' Association (AISA) demanding justice for Samarveer Singh, outside the Hindu College campus.

Faculties and students expressed anger on social media after the incident. Student groups called for a protest on Thursday to mourn Samarveer's death and protest the university's actions. DU teachers wrote to the Delhi University Vice Chancellor demanding justice for the deceased lecturer. Aam Aadmi Party's teachers' wing Academic for Action and Development Delhi Teachers' Association (AADTA) has called a protest in North Campus. Students and teachers of Delhi University also held a press conference over "massive ongoing displacement" in the backdrop of the "institutional murder" of Samarveer Singh.

The university has defended its decision, saying that it was forced to remove the ad hoc teachers due to financial constraints. However, critics say that the university has enough money to pay its teachers, but that it is simply unwilling to do so. Kapil Sibal, in a tweet, said, "Suicide by: Former ad hoc teacher. New Education Policy? Is this the vision?" and called for putting an end to the phenomenon of having ad-hoc teachers and said the education profession should not be devalued.

Monami Basu, a member of the Delhi University Academic Council, blamed the college principals for the tragic death in an SFI-organized protest. She alleged that mass displacement was facilitated by the principals who adhered to the ruling party's diktats and failed to support colleagues.

"I am calling it an institutional murder because it was caused by failures of this inefficient system. People should know the circumstances in which teachers like Samarveer did so much hard work during the pandemic and afterwards. They have been performing more hours than permanent teachers. He shared his lunch with faculty members for seven years, made huge emotional investment and was ousted from his job after a five-minute interview. Just imagine the stress that people with children working in ad hoc positions go through after such humiliation."

They demanded that the university should take action to prevent such tragedies from happening in the future. The university has said that it is conducting an inquiry into the teacher's death. However, students and teachers are not satisfied with the university's response. They say that the university needs to do more to address the issue of job insecurity among ad-hoc teachers. Talking to a news group, Samarveer's cousin said that he was depressed after his removal from the college job.

"He was perturbed by the fact that he had served in the college for seven years and someone else had taken his position because of his political affiliation to the ruling party. He would often repeat his predicament."

=== Ad-hoc policy and corruption ===
Samarveer's death highlighted the plight of ad-hoc teachers in India. There are an estimated 1.5 million ad hoc teachers in the country, who are employed on temporary contracts and are paid a pittance and do not have the same benefits as regular teachers. Ad-hoc teachers are often hired on short-term contracts and are not guaranteed job security which can lead to stress, anxiety, and depression. Moreover, multiple ad-hoc teachers have reportedly been dismissed after serving for several years due to brief interviews lasting only two minutes, as per allegations.

During March 2023, the Indian Education Ministry informed the Parliament that more than 6,000 teaching positions in Central Universities across the nation are unfilled. Ironically, in the previous year, over 4,000 temporary teachers were recruited by these same Central Universities. Ad-hoc teachers cost less for Universities and governments as they are not entitled to benefits such as gratuity, pension, medical allowance, etc. States such as Uttar Pradesh have over 50% teacher vacancies, while Bihar has a low teacher-student ratio of 1:61 in higher education, the lowest in the country.

Particularly, Delhi University colleges have long been concerned about 'connections' playing a bigger role than merit or qualifications in job appointments, with the strength of a candidate's connections often deciding their fate.

Shortage of funds is a common excuse given for the ad-hocism in place of proper-employment leading to poor education. However, in 2021–22, out of Rs. 93,224 crore budgeted for education in the Union Budget, Rs. 36,657 crore went unutilized.

Activists reported that experienced teachers were removed after brief interviews despite their competence in teaching. The interview weightage increased from 20% to 100% after the UGC notification in 2018, resulting in a flawed system. Teaching experience and research are disregarded, thus creating an opportunity for corruption.

The Chairperson of the National Assessment and Accreditation Council (NAAC) executive committee resigned in March 2023 alleging widespread irregularities and manipulation of NAAC's verification and grading process by vested interests. The Comptroller and Auditor General of India found discrepancies in NAAC's inspections and reports leading to inaccurate grades.

== Personal life ==
Samarveer Singh hailed from Molki village in Baran district of Rajasthan, and he shared a flat in Delhi with his cousin. He had done his masters at Hindu College itself, completing an M.Phil. degree, and was further pursuing a PhD from the Delhi University. He had been working as an ad-hoc assistant professor for seven years, teaching philosophy at Hindu College.

In February 2023, he was removed from his position after an arbitrary 2-minute interview following which a less-qualified candidate was appointed in his place, also disregarding his years of experience in teaching. Later, Samarveer was offered the role of a guest lecturer by the college after his removal from the ad-hoc position at the DU. Though he was yet to accept the position, he was called back to Hindu College to continue at his ad-hoc position, hence he rejected the offer of guest-lectureship, also considering there being a significant difference in the salary of an ad hoc professor and the remuneration for guest lectureship. However, days after resuming his job, he was again disallowed, indicating gross mismanagement by the authorities. Aside from the financial difficulties for his family including aging parents, his mother had recently lost vision in an eye. This helpless situation he was pushed back into took a serious toll on his mental health. Another friend reported Samarveer had depression; and had stopped responding to calls and texts.

=== Death ===
On the day of the incident, his cousin-flatmate was out and when he returned from work, he found that the front door was bolted shut from the inside. Despite repeated attempts to gain a response by ringing the doorbell, no one answered. Consequently, the police were alerted, and a mobile crime team was dispatched to force open the door. Unfortunately, Samarveer was discovered deceased inside. His body was found hanging by the ceiling fan.

Despite no suicide note being discovered, DCP (Outer) Harendra K. Singh reported that Samarveer's cousin informed police that Samarveer had been struggling after losing his job. No evidence of foul play was found, and after the post-mortem at Babu Jagjivan Ram Memorial Hospital, his family claimed his body for the last rites to be done back home in Rajasthan.
