= Viktoriya Divak =

Russian handball player (1993–2023)

Personal information
- Nationality: Russian
- Born: 7 May 1993 Volgograd, Russia
- Died: 17 April 2023 (aged 29) Astrakhan, Russia
- Height: 1.75 m (5 ft 9 in)

Sport
- Sport: Handball
- Position: Left-back, center-back

Senior clubs
- Years: Team
- 2011–2014: Dinamo Volgograd
- 2014–2017: HC Kuban Krasnodar
- 2017–2018: Achenheim Truchtersheim Handball
- 2018–2019: SV Union Halle-Neustadt
- 2019–2021: HC Gomel
- 2021–2023: HC Astrakhanochka
National team
- Years: Team
- 2009–2010: Russia U-17

Viktoriya Viktorovna Divak (Russian: Виктория Викторовна Дивак; 7 May 1993 – 17 April 2023) was a Russian handball player who played in the Russian Women's Handball Super League for several years.

== Club career ==
Divak began her career at Dinamo Volgograd, with whom she won the Russian championship three times. In 2014, the backcourt player moved to league rivals HC Kuban Krasnodar. In the summer of 2017, she was signed by the French third division club Achenheim Truchtersheim Handball (ATH). After Divak had risen to the second highest French league a year later with ATH, she moved to the newly promoted Bundesliga team SV Union Halle-Neustadt. With Halle-Neustadt, she was in the final four of the DHB-Pokal in the 2018–19 season.

Divak joined Belarusian first division club HC Gomel in 2019, with whom she won the national championship in her first season. She also won the Belarusian Cup twice. In 2021, she moved to the Russian first division club Astrakhanochka.

== International career ==
Divak represented the Russian youth national team. At the U-17 European Championships in 2009, she won the silver medal with Russia. During the course of the tournament, Divak scored 39 goals. The following year, she represented Russia at the U-18 World Cup. In the same year she won the silver medal at the Summer Youth Olympic Games.

== Personal life and death ==
Divak was the daughter of Viktor Divak who played football and played for Rotor Volgograd, among others. On 17 April 2023, she died after falling from the eighth floor of an apartment building in Astrakhan. She was 29.

== Honours ==
=== Club ===
- Russian Championship:
  - 2011–12, 2012–13, 2013–14
- Belarusian Championship:
  - 2019, 2020
