= Michael Saywell =

British equestrian (1942–2023)

Personal information
- Nationality: British
- Born: 27 August 1942; Lincolnshire, England
- Died: 2 April 2023 (aged 80)

Sport
- Sport: Equestrian

Michael Saywell (27 August 1942 – 2 April 2023) was a British equestrian. He competed in two events at the 1972 Summer Olympics.

Saywell died on 2 April 2023, at the age of 80.
