= Tu Tongjin =

Chinese military officer (1914–2023)

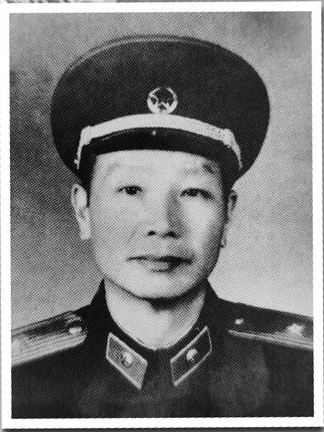
- Born: 11 September 1914; Fujian, China
- Died: 3 April 2023 (aged 108); Beijing, China
- Political party: Chinese Communist

Doctor Tu Tongjin (Chinese: 涂通今, 11 September 1914 – 3 April 2023) was a Chinese military officer and neurosurgeon. He was one of the last survivors of the Long March.

== Biography ==
Tu was born in Fujian. In 1934, Mao Zedong visited his village advocating for the peasants to seize the land of wealthy landlords by force. Tu joined the Chinese Red Army in September 1934 against his parents wishes. He was trained as a medic; unlike most soldiers he had some primary school education. During the battle of the Xiang River, he crossed a river while under fire from Kuomintang bombers; after the battle the non-walking wounded were ordered to be abandoned. In another battle, Tu and three other medics became separated from the army after getting lost. During one winter, he foraged for food and medicine to treat 300 men suffering from snow blindness. He later recalled the lack of food and sleep; in one incident he fell off a cliff while sleep deprived but was caught by tree branches on the rockface.

Following the establishment of the People's Republic of China, Tu was sent to the Soviet Union to study neurosurgery at the Burdenko Neurosurgery Institute in Moscow, becoming one of three Red Army soldiers with a doctorate after five years of study. He became a founding major general of the People's Liberation Army in 1964. Tu taught neurosurgery at the Fourth Military Medical University in Xi'an, Shaanxi for 20 years. He later served as the President of the Chinese Military Medical Academy, having taught there after earning his doctorate.

Tu died on 3 April 2023 at the age of 108.
