= Dick Chrobak =

Canadian football player

Profile
- Positions: Guard, Offensive tackle

Personal information
- Born: June 9, 1941; Winnipeg, Manitoba, Canada
- Died: April 27, 2023 (aged 81)
- Listed height: 5 ft 11 in (1.80 m)
- Listed weight: 215 lb (98 kg)

Career history
- 1959: BC Lions
- 1962–1964: Edmonton Eskimos

Dick Chrobak (June 9, 1941 – April 27, 2023) is a Canadian football player who played for the Edmonton Eskimos and BC Lions.
