= Bernadine Strik =

Horticulturalist (1962–2023)

- Born: April 29, 1962; The Hague
- Died: April 14, 2023 (aged 60); Corvallis, Oregon
- Education: University of Victoria and University of Guelph
- Occupation: Horticulturist

Bernadine Strik (April 29, 1962 – April 14, 2023) was a Dutch-Canadian-American horticulturist, horticultural researcher, and professor of horticulture.

== Early life and education ==
Bernadine Cornelia Strik was born April 29, 1962, in The Hague. In 1965 her family moved to Tantanoola, South Australia, and in 1971 to Qualicum Beach, Vancouver, Canada. Strik's parents, Gerald and Christine (née Alkemade) Strik, owned a nursery and landscaping business. Both sets of grandparents had been in the produce industry in Holland.

Strik graduated from the University of Victoria with a bachelor's degree in botany in 1983 and from the University of Guelph with a doctoral degree in horticulture in 1987.

== Career ==
Strik taught horticulture at Oregon State University starting in 1987 as an assistant professor. In 1997 she became a full professor. Her primary research interests were berries, and in particular blueberries.

Strik's research changed the methods used by blueberry growers in the United States and elsewhere. Prior to her work, farmers had planted blueberry bushes four feet apart, mulching them with sawdust, and providing no support. Strik developed recommendations to space the plants closer together, trellis them, and use weedmats; her research increased yields and reduced losses. She also developed methods for organic farming of blueberries, including the use of raised beds. She also developed methods for growing strawberries, raspberries, blackberries and cranberries. Outside of berries, Strik helped identify and combat the 1990 phylloxera invasion that threatened Oregon's wineries.

In 2007 she was elected a fellow of the American Society for Horticultural Science and in 2021 a fellow of the International Society for Horticultural Science. She retired in 2021.

== Impact ==
According to the US Department of Agriculture, “Her research in blueberry production and nutrient management has had impacts that few have ever matched".

== Personal life ==
Strik married fellow horticulturist Neil Bell in 1994. The couple had two daughters. She died of ovarian cancer April 14, 2023, in Corvallis, Oregon.
