= Morison Zuill =

Scottish cricketer (1937–2023)

Personal information
- Full name: Andrew Morison Zuill
- Born: 22 April 1937; Falkirk, Stirlingshire, Scotland
- Died: 25 April 2023 (aged 86); Scotland
- Batting: Right-handed

Domestic team information
- Years: Team
- 1962–1979: Scotland

Career statistics
Competition	First-class
Matches	9
Runs scored	231
Batting average	15.40
100s/50s	–/1
Top score	62
Catches/stumpings	1/–
- Source: Cricinfo, 14 June 2022

Andrew Morison Zuill (22 April 1937 – 25 April 2023) was a Scottish first-class cricketer and accountant.

Zuill was born at Falkirk in April 1937. He was educated at Merchiston Castle School, before matriculating to the University of Edinburgh where he studied to become an accountant. A club cricketer for Stenhousemuir Cricket Club, Zuill made his debut in first-class cricket for Scotland against Warwickshire at Edgbaston in 1962. He was a regular feature in the Scottish team of the 1960s, making seven first-class appearances; however, he played in just two first-class matches for Scotland in the 1970s, against Ireland at Dublin in 1975, and the touring Sri Lankans in 1979. Morison scored 231 runs in his nine first-class matches, at an average of 15.40. He made one score over fifty, with 62 against Ireland in 1968. By profession, Zuill was an accountant. He later became a national selector for Scotland. His club cricket with Stenhousemuir spanned over thirty years, which included being the club captain from 1957 to 1989, when he passed the captaincy to his son, Douglas. In his club career, he scored 27,588 runs and made nine centuries.
