= The Meek (disambiguation) =

The Meek is a fantasy webcomic written and drawn by Der-Shing Helmer.

The Meek may also refer to:

- People who display meekness
- People as a group referred to in Matthew 5:5 in the Beatitudes in the Christian bible

== See also ==
- Meek (disambiguation)
- Meeks, a surname
