= Meek (disambiguation) =

Meek is the adjectival form of meekness.

Meek may also refer to:

- Meek (surname), a surname (and list of people with the name)
- MeeK (musician) (born 1971), Franco-British alternative pop singer-songwriter
- Meek (singer), British pop singer
- Meek (street artist) (born 1978), Australian street artist
- Meek, Nebraska, an unincorporated community
- Meek Mansion, a historic home near Hayward, California
- Meek Channel, a strait in the Argentine Islands, Wilhelm Archipelago
- Meek, a character in the comic strip Eek & Meek
- Meek's method of tabulating ranked ballots, a form of Single transferable vote

== See also ==
- The Meek, a fantasy webcomic
- Meek Mill or Robert Williams, American hip-hop artist
- Meek's lorikeet (Charmosyna meeki), a parrot
- Meek's pygmy parrot (Micropsitta meeki), a parrot
- Meek's graphium (Graphium meeki), a butterfly
- Meeks (disambiguation)
