= Meeke =

Meeke is an English surname. It originated from meke, a Middle English nickname for a humble or meek person, which came from Old Norse word mjúkr. Outside of England, Meeke has had historical prevalence as a surname in the County Down, in Ireland.

Notable people with the surname include:

- Alison Meeke (born 1991), Irish field hockey player
- Brent Meeke (born 1952), Canadian ice hockey player
- Elizabeth Meeke (1761–c. 1826?), British author
- Kris Meeke (born 1979), Northern Irish rally driver
- William Meeke (1758–1830), British politician

== See also ==
- Meek (surname)
