= Meeks =

Meeks is a surname of Scottish origin. Notable people with the surname include:

== People ==
- Aaron Meeks (born 1986), American actor
- Annette Meeks (born 1960), American politician
- Bob Meeks (born 1969), American football player
- Brian Meeks (born 1953), Jamaican poet
- Brock Meeks, American online investigative journalist
- Bryant Meeks (1926–2007), American football player
- Dale Meeks (1975–2023), English actor
- Demond Meeks (born 1979), African-American union organizer and politician
- Geoff Meeks (born 1949), British accounting scholar
- Gregory Meeks (born 1953), African-American politician
- Hilda Meeks (died 1935), girlfriend murdered by boxer Del Fontaine
- Howard Meeks (1932–2016), sixth bishop of the Episcopal Diocese of Western Michigan
- Jackson Meeks (born 2003), American football player
- James Meeks (born 1954), American Baptist minister and former Illinois state senator
- James A. Meeks (1864–1946), American politician
- James E. Meeks (fl. 1978–1985, dean and professor of law
- Jeremy Meeks (born 1984), American fashion model and convicted criminal
- Jodie Meeks (born 1987), American basketball coach and former player
- John Meeks (1839–1899), English-born Australian politician
- John Meeks (basketball player) (born 1999), American basketball player
- Joseph Meeks (1771–1868), American furniture maker and company founder
- Michael Meeks (basketball) (born 1972), Canadian former basketball player
- Michael Meeks (software developer), British software developer
- Priddy Meeks (1795–1886), American frontier doctor and LDS pioneer
- Quenton Meeks (born 1997), American football player, son of Ron Meeks
- Reginald Meeks (born 1954), American politician
- Robert Meeks (1934–2023), American politician
- Ron Meeks (born 1954), American football coach and player, father of Quenton Meeks
- Sammy Meeks (1923-2007), American professional baseball player
- Stephen Meeks (born 1974), American politician
- Travis Meeks (born 1979), American rock musician and singer
- William B. Meeks Jr. (1921–1999), American producer, composer and arranger of radio jingles
- William Hamilton Meeks, III (1947–2026), American mathematician

== Fictional characters ==
- Randy Meeks, from the Scream films
- Shorty Meeks and Brenda Meeks, characters from Scary Movie
- Meeks, an evil wizard in the fantasy novel The Black Unicorn by Terry Brooks

== See also ==
- Senator Meeks (disambiguation)
- Meek (surname)
