= Senator Meek =

Senator Meek may refer to:

- Carrie Meek (1926–2021), Florida State Senate
- Kendrick Meek (born 1966), Florida State Senate

== See also ==
- Senator Meeks (disambiguation)
