= Meek (surname) =

Meek is a surname of Scottish origins. Notable people with the surname include:

- Albert Stewart Meek (1871–1943), British bird collector and naturalist
- Alexander Beaufort Meek (1814–1865), American politician, lawyer, writer and poet
- Barbara Meek (1934–2015), American actress
- Bill Meek (1922–1998), American football coach
- Carrie P. Meek (1926–2021), American politician from Florida
- Chantal Meek (born 1978), English-born Australian canoeist
- Donald Meek (1878–1946), Scottish character actor
- Emil Weber Meek (born 1988), Norwegian performer of martial art (MMA)
- Esther Meek (born 1953), American philosopher
- Evan Meek, American baseball pitcher
- Fielding Bradford Meek (1817–1876), American geologist and paleontologist
- Georgia Meek, British singer
- Hudson Meek (2008–2024), American child actor
- James Meek (minister) (1742–1810), Scottish minister
- James Meek (author), British novelist and journalist
- Janice Meek, ocean rower
- Jeffrey Meek (born 1959), American actor
- Jenna Meek, British entrepreneur
- Jerry Meek (born 1970), American lawyer and activist
- Joe Meek (1929–1967), British record producer and composer
- Joseph Meek (1810–1875), American explorer, soldier and politician
- Kendrick Meek (born 1966), American politician from Florida
- Larissa Meek, American model
- MeeK (musician) (born 1971), Franco-British singer/songwriter.
- Meek (street artist), street artist based in Melbourne, Australia
- Patrick Meek, American speed skater
- Ronald L. Meek (1917–1978), New Zealand-born economist
- S. P. Meek (1894–1972), US military chemist, early science fiction author, and children's author
- Seth Eugene Meek (1859–1914), American ichthyologist
- Stephen Meek (guide) (1805–1889), fur trapper and guide in the American west
- Theophile Meek, Canadian archaeologist
- Tom Meek (born 1959), American journalist, columnist
- Vicki Meek (born 1950), American visual artist

== See also ==
- Meek (disambiguation)
- Meeks (disambiguation)
