= John Augsburger =

American politician

Member of the Indiana Senate from the 13th district
- In office November 3, 1976 – November 9, 1988
- Preceded by: John Frederick Augsburger
- Succeeded by: Robert Meeks

Personal details
- Born: 1934 (age 91–92)
- Party: Republican

John B. Augsburger (born 1934) is an American former politician from the state of Indiana. A Republican, he served in the Indiana State Senate.
