= Rococo Revival =

19th-century revival style

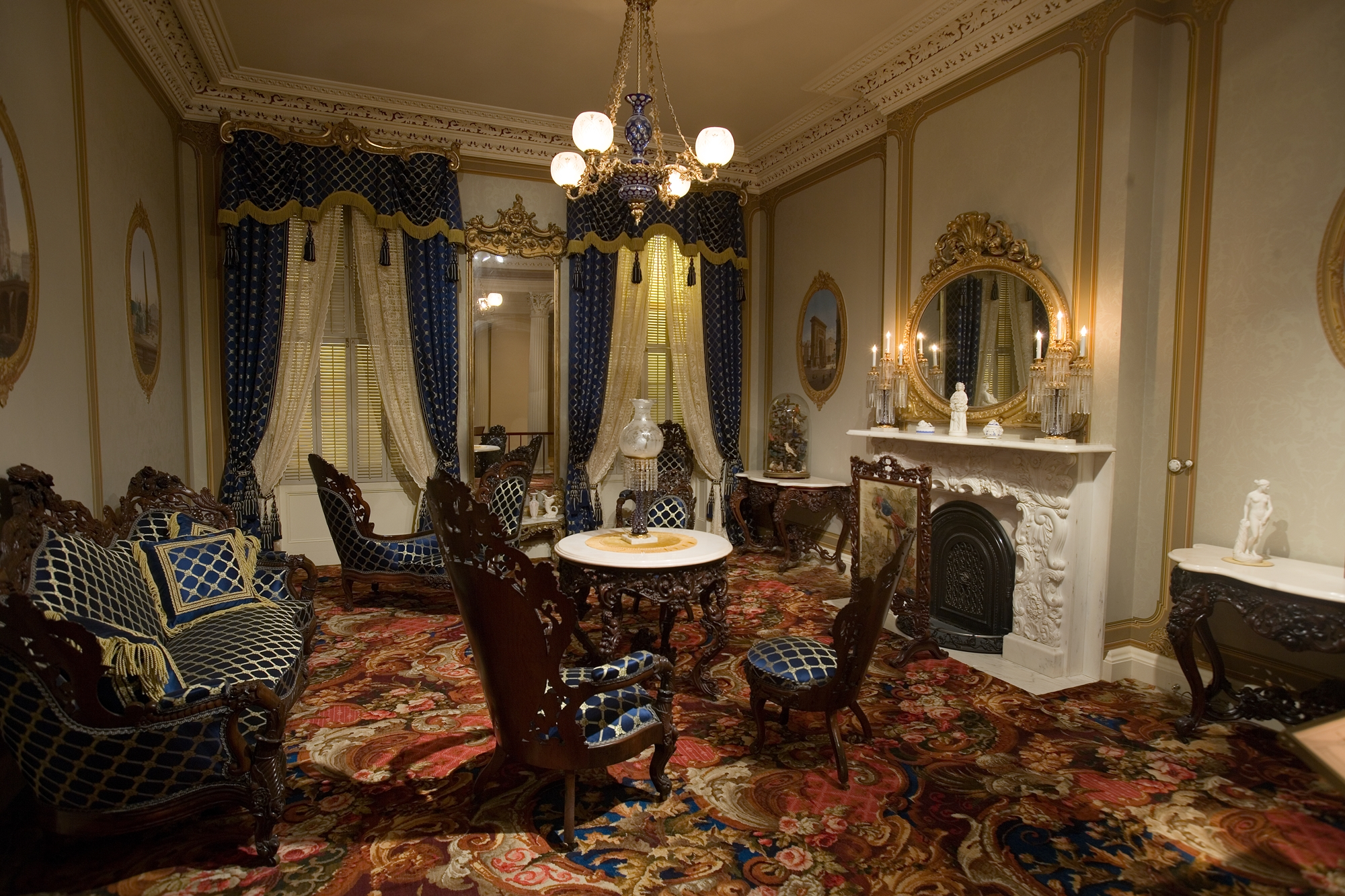
Photograph of a Rococo Revival Parlor in the Metropolitan Museum of Art (New York City)

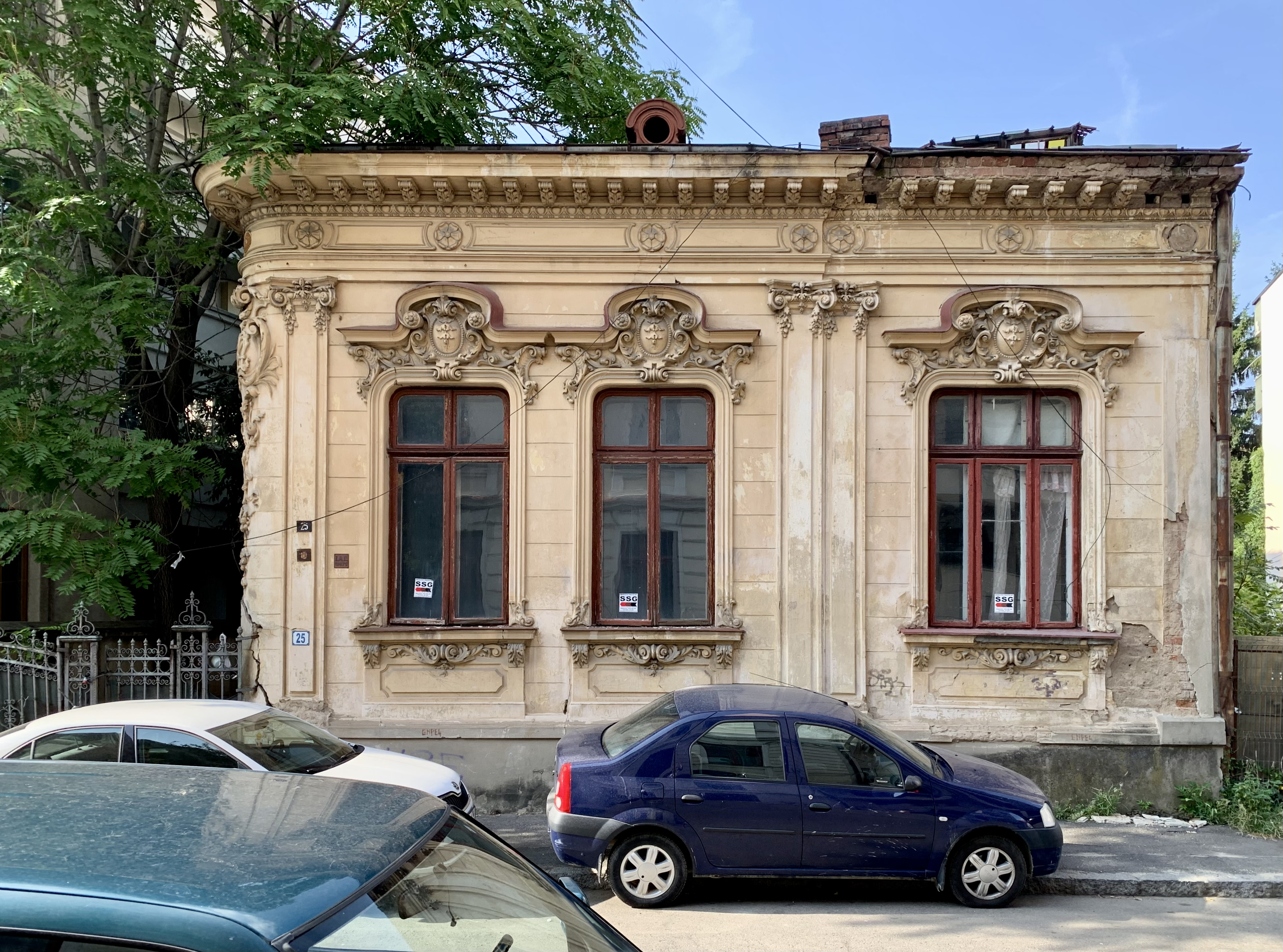
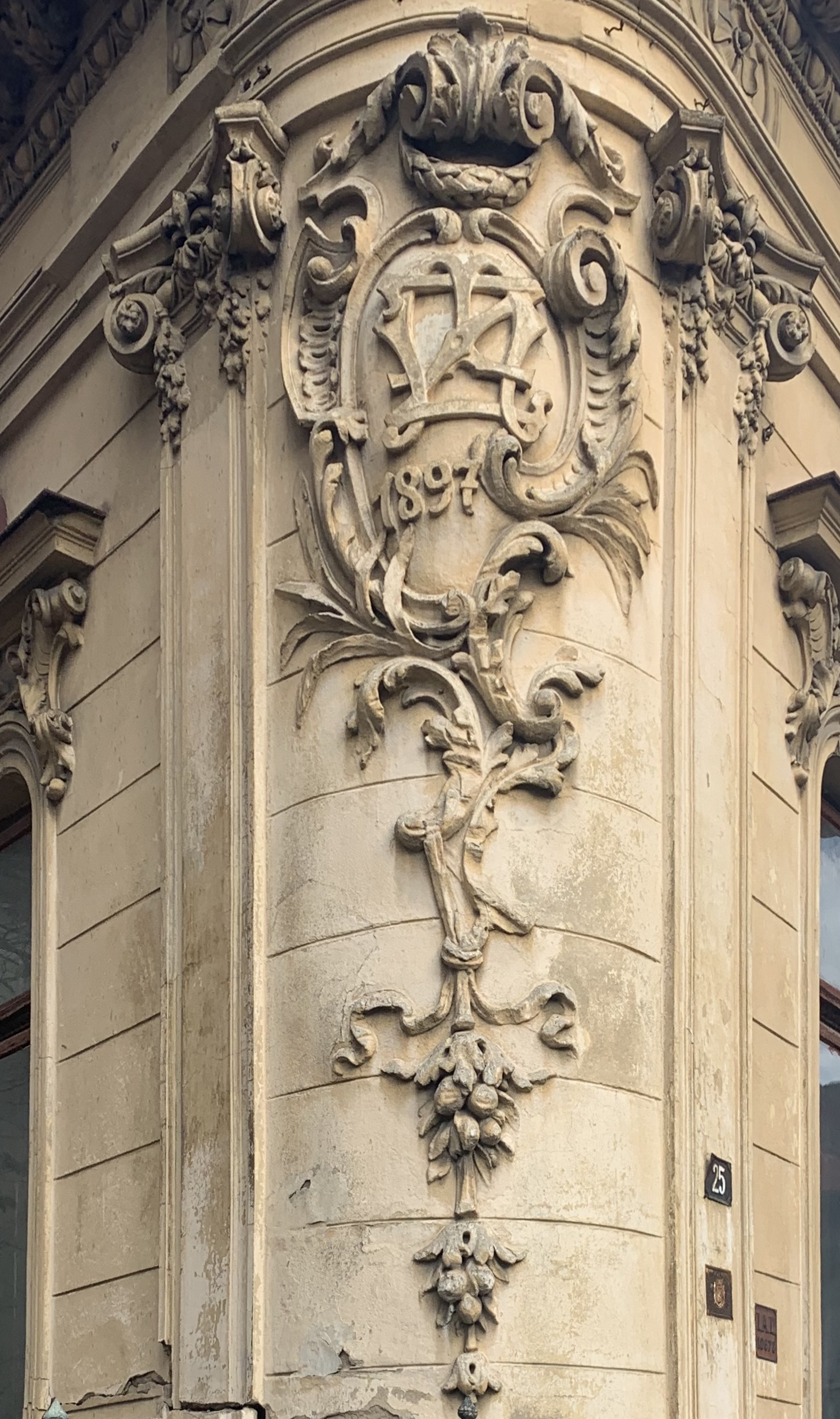
House no. 25 Strada Ernest Broșteanu in Bucharest (Romania), an example of Rococo Revival architecture

The Rococo Revival style emerged in Britain and France in the 19th century. Revival of the rococo style was seen all throughout Europe during the 19th century within a variety of artistic modes and expression including decorative objects of art, paintings, art prints, furniture, and interior design. In much of Europe and particularly in France, the original rococo was regarded as a national style, and to many, its reemergence recalled national tradition. Rococo revival epitomized grandeur and luxury in European style and was another expression of 19th century romanticism and the growing interest and fascination with natural landscape.

During the later half of the nineteenth century, Rococo Revival was also fashionable in American furniture and interior design. John Henry Belter was considered the most prominent figure of Rococo Revival furniture making. Revival of the Rococo style was not restricted to a specific time period or place, but occurred in several waves throughout the 19th century.

== Origins ==
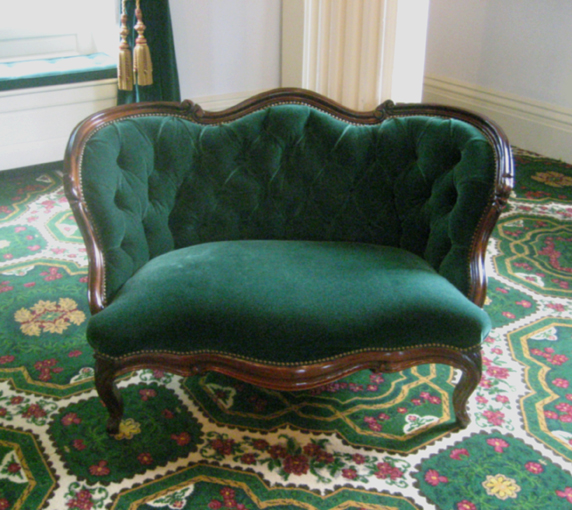
Rococo Revival sofa by Blake and Davenport purchased for the Vermont State House in 1859

=== Early Rococo ===
The term Rococo was widely used to designate artistic style of the early 18th century in Europe and especially France. Rococo emerged during the early 18th century as a French mode of interior design and was considered the predominant artistic style in Europe at the time. However, there was no "rococo" art—the word "rococo" only emerged following the French Revolution and not commonly used until the early 19th century.

Sinuous lines, intricate decoration, and both fanciful and naturalistic motifs characterized the rococo style. As stated in a publication by Nóra Veszprémi, the style was "characterized by intricate and refined ornament" and "associated with luxury, aristocracy, refinement, and wealth." Towards the end of the century with the arrival of neoclassicism, the term rococo was used to criticize any neo-classical art in including the Gothic, the Baroque, and any earlier styles of the century.

=== Louis XV Style in France ===
In the mid-nineteenth century, the term rococo referred to a style recalling the ornament and design aesthetics of the Louis XV style and early Louis XVI style. The period between 1715 and 1745, encompassing the reign of Louis XV, is generally accepted as the high point of the Rococo style in French art.

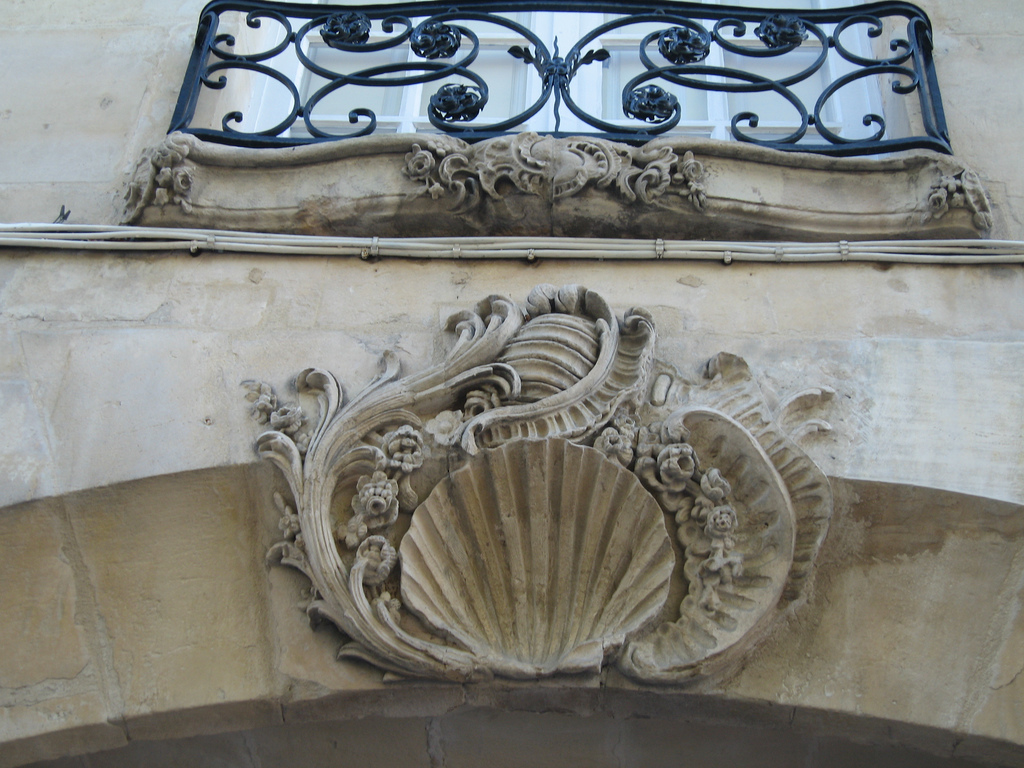
A Rocaille ornament in Caen (France)

=== Etymology ===
Rococo was thought to derive from a combination of the French words rocaille, which characterizes a form of colorful and irregular rockwork used to embellish grottoes and fountains, and coquillage, shell motifs that accompanied the rocaille. Another possibility is that the expression combined rocaille with the Italian adjective barocco, meaning misshaped, malformed, or convoluted.

== Rococo Revival in England (1811-1830) ==
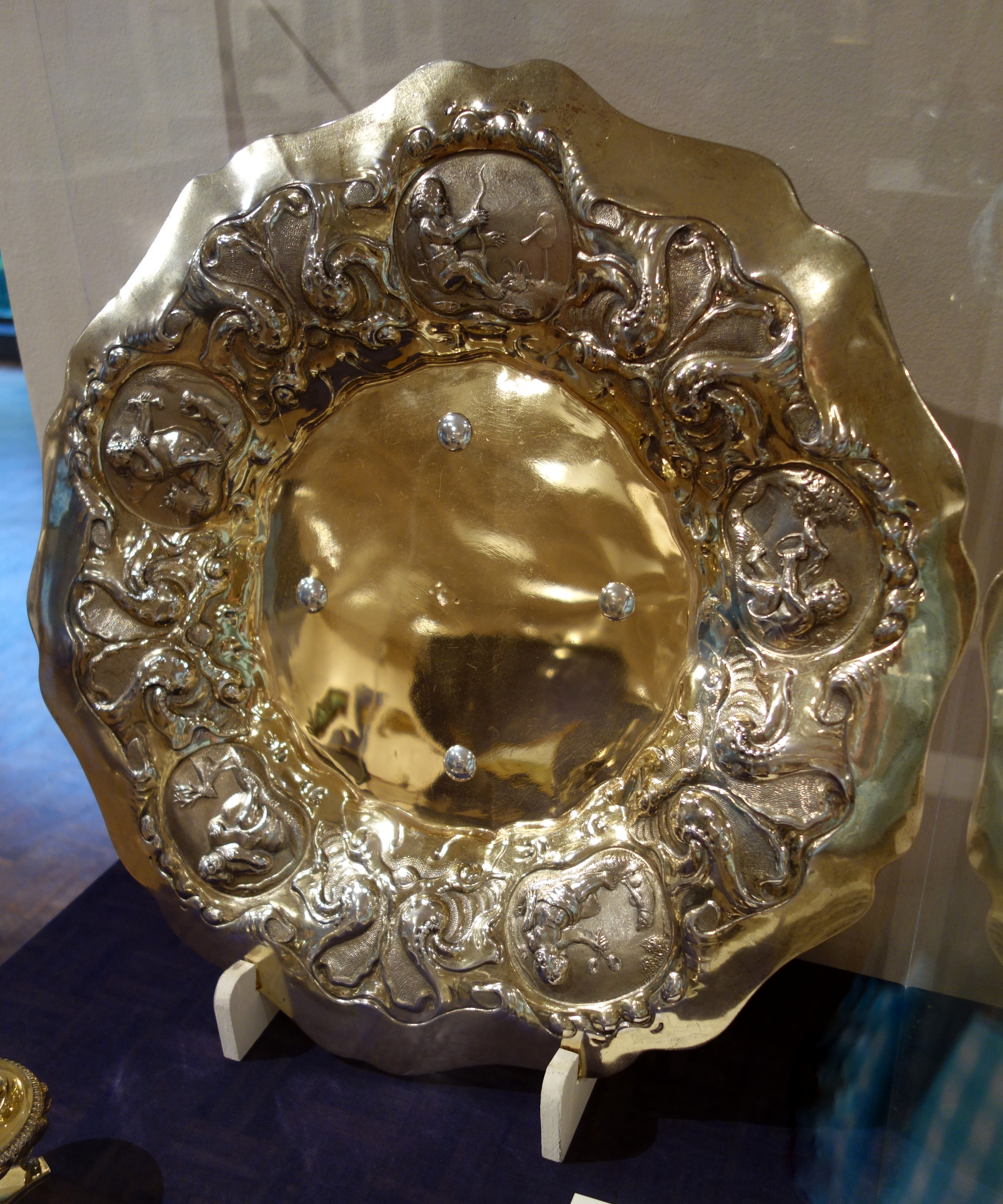
Gilt Charger, Paul Storr, British, 1810–1811, silver, Huntington Museum of Art

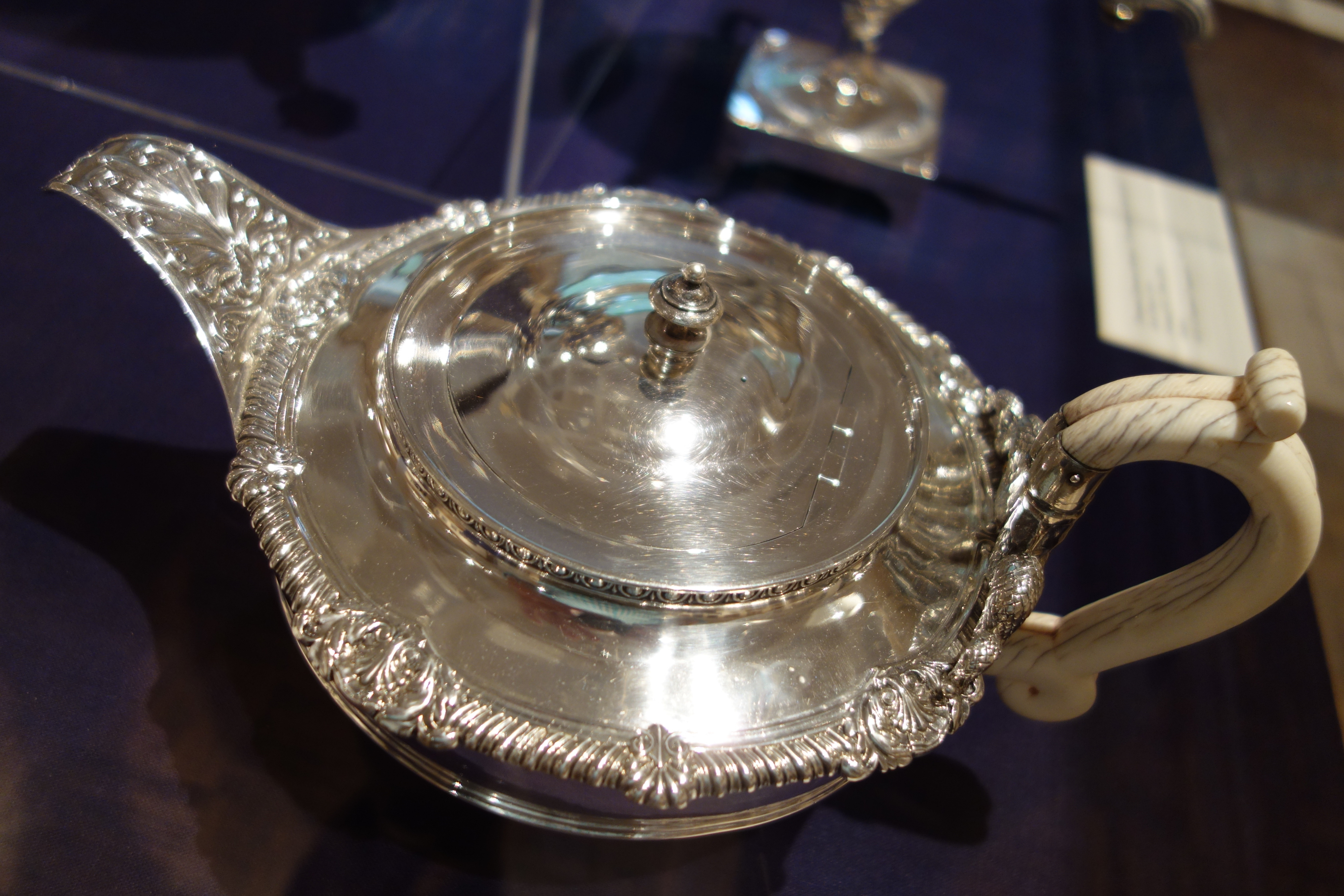
Teapot, Paul Storr, British, 1814–1815, silver, Huntington Museum of Art

During the Regency era, the Prince Regent (who later became King George IV) patronized makers of high-quality works of rococo silver. The Prince Regent favored neoclassical elements of more luxurious interpretations of the late Louis XV and Louis XVI periods. The tastes of the Prince Regent helped fuel interest in the rococo revival spirit in England.

Paul Storr was recognized as one of the most important and well-renowned English silversmiths. His quality of workmanship and versatility enabled him to create works that suited a wide range of tastes and preferences. Many rococo themes and motifs can be found in his works. An example of his work is a salver featuring signs of the Zodiac, a border cast chased with rococo scrolls, rococo decoration of the surface, and feet in rococo-cartouche form. One of the most monumental works created in rococo expression was Storr's large candelabrum, created during the reign of William IV. The piece featured flowing branches and rolling, curved surfaces.

During the late 1820s, the aristocracy commissioned anti-classical styles, producing a much different expression of rococo in England. Manufacturers in Birmingham and Sheffield became mass-producers of Sheffield plate, a layered combination of silver and copper. Mass-production also enabled silver embossed with scrolls, flowers, and foliage, which were produced cheaply by steam-presses on thin silver. These wares were made to imply luxury, not previously available on thin-sheeted silver, while mass-production allowed for mass-distribution and export. Historically reserved for royalty and aristocrats, industrialization and technological advances in machinery made rococo silver accessible to a broader audience.

Metal works based on Parisian design that were truly rococo were in ormolu, or bronze cover in finely-ground gold. Parisian designers responded to the desire and tastes of Napoleon III and his wife Eugénie. They sought legitimacy of their court through stylistic references to the ancien régime style of Louis XV.

== Rococo Revival in France ==
=== Louis Philippe (1830-1848) ===
The rising bourgeoisie in France demanded rococo decorative-art objects as a reflection of status, wealth, and material possession. The bourgeois consumer purchased objects and furnishings from a variety of revival styles, including rococo, for its significance in historicizing opulence and grandeur.

Modern French Rococo furniture was characterized by its lightness, elegance and grace. Its ornamentation consisted of delicate foliage and intricate details. Other characteristics included: embellished and elaborate carving, rich carving of floral and fruit motifs, curved frames, and tufted upholstery.

=== Second Empire (1852-1870) ===
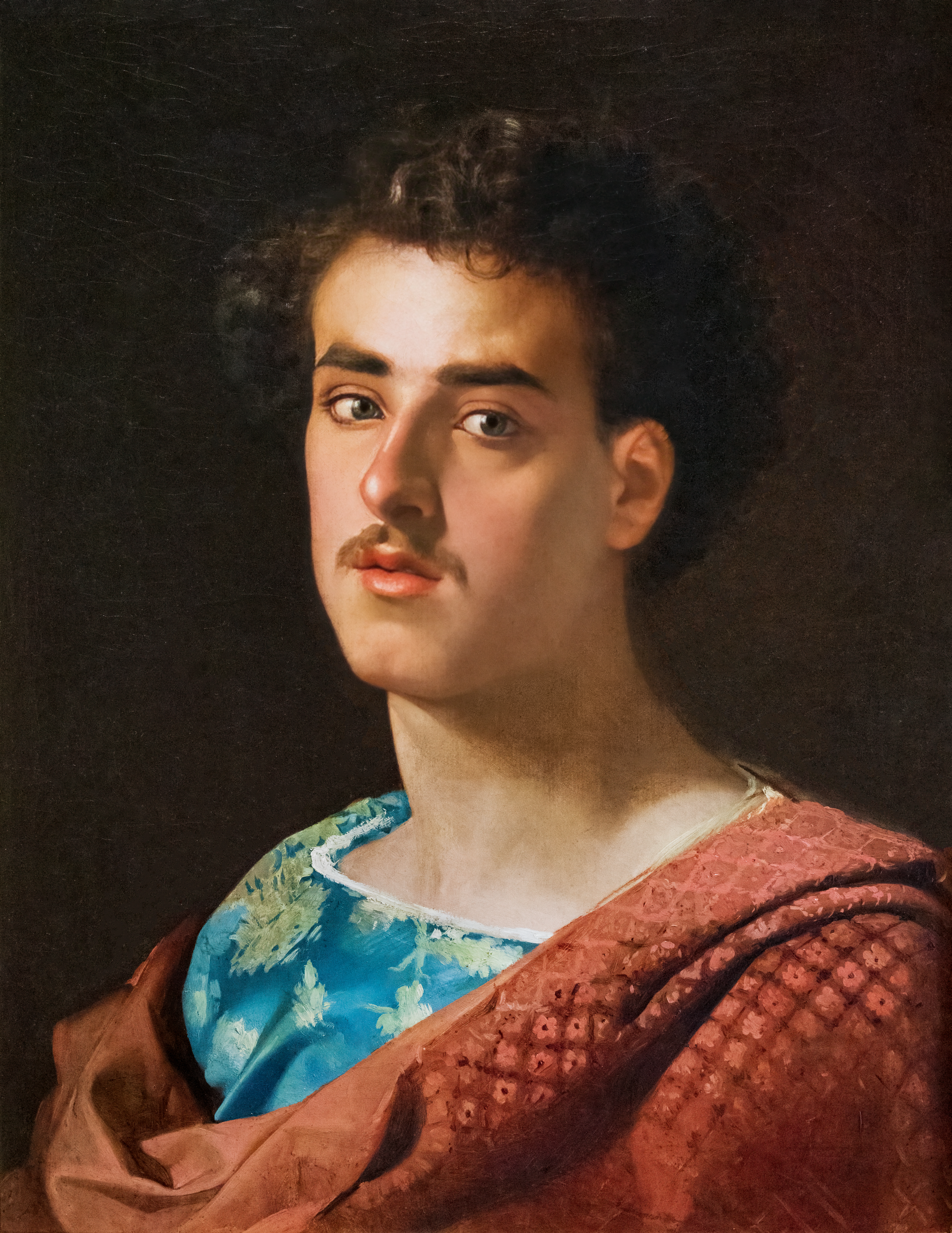
Mariano Fortuny - Self-portrait - MNAC

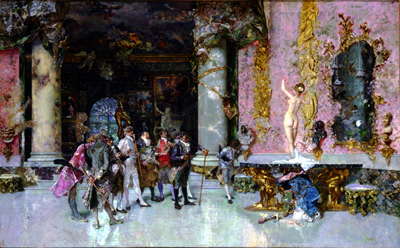
Mariano Fortuny, The Choice of a Model, 1874. Oil on canvas

According to a publication by Caroline Ingra, Italian artists came to Paris during the Second Empire in search for artistic opportunities. Rome remained the center for young artists wanting to study classical tradition but not for artists who wanted to study contemporary art. They adapted the fashionable revival of eighteenth-century rococo genre painting. The fame and recognition of these Italian artists of Spanish origin and based primarily on the work of Mariano Fortuny.

Paris represented the latest in modern artistic development and attracted many artists. Fortuny attracted an audience in Paris upon first appearance in 1860. His work had a resemblance to 18th century paintings by Antoine Watteau and Jean-Honoré Fragonard. The late Second Empire patrons were most interested in Fortuny's revival of 18th century genre painting.

Fortuny's rococo-revival imagery was especially appealing to the French audience during the last years of the Second Empire. During this period, a major revival interest was seen in 18th century Paris and genre painting that was practiced by academic artists. For the increasing bourgeois audience, the rococo-revival paintings presented an optimistic outlook on life and were appropriate to the new Parisian ‘nobility’ of the late Second Empire.

Ingra notes that, "The vogue for rococo imagery [during the Second Empire] however, represented more than a shift in patronage and, consequently, taste. The interest in prerevolutionary art was part of the efforts of Second Empire officialdom to establish legitimacy for itself by connecting with a period when royalty was as yet unchallenged." She continues by asserting, "Reviving this early regime was a means of flattering themselves and emphasizing their own imperialist claims, in hope of achieving the awe and respect of the populace supposedly enjoyed by the former regime."

The Second Empire was interested in reviving rococo art as a means to regenerate the ideals and values of the old regime. It was a means to emphasize pride, power, and respect in hopes of achieving admiration and devotion enjoyed by the former regime. However, some contemporary figures were appalled and considered that the exploitation of rococo revival by Italian artists was an inferior body of work. Critics saw this new manner of painting as vapid and without style.

=== Third Republic (1870-1940) ===
The French State sought to promote patrimony following its defeat in Franco-Prussian War. Late 19th-century France heavily invested in rococo style as a means to regenerate national pride and heritage.

== The Second Rococo in Austria and Hungary (1830s) ==
In Austria and Hungary, revival of the Rococo style came to be known as the "second Rococo" and was seen in the visual arts and interior furnishings, but most prominently seen in painting. As demonstrated in a publication by Nora Veszprémi, Rococo reemerged at the 1845 industrial exhibition, where an entire salon was furnished in Rococo style. The opulent room was known as "Kaiser Salon" and many critics regarded the display as "an exciting, new, and modern trend in fashion." Interior design and furnishings at the time were generally modest in ornamentation, recalling neoclassical forms of the late eighteenth and early nineteenth century.

The second Rococo was "a product of modern, industrialized Austria and its new middle class of prosperous manufacturers." It appeared within the first decades of nineteenth-century Austria during a period economic and industrial upsurge and was largely a product of industrialization. It had emerged at two industrial exhibitions that promoted Austrian industry, where critics and the general population were largely receptive.

With the commodification of art in the modern world, the style resurfaced in painting. Rococo aspects in painting, both its values and stylistic ornamentation, were considered objects of the past. In opposition to an "intrinsic higher meaning of art," its association with modernity depicts a contrasting former mode of artistic expression as a means of historicizing the visual arts.

== John Henry Belter and Rococo Revival furniture in America ==
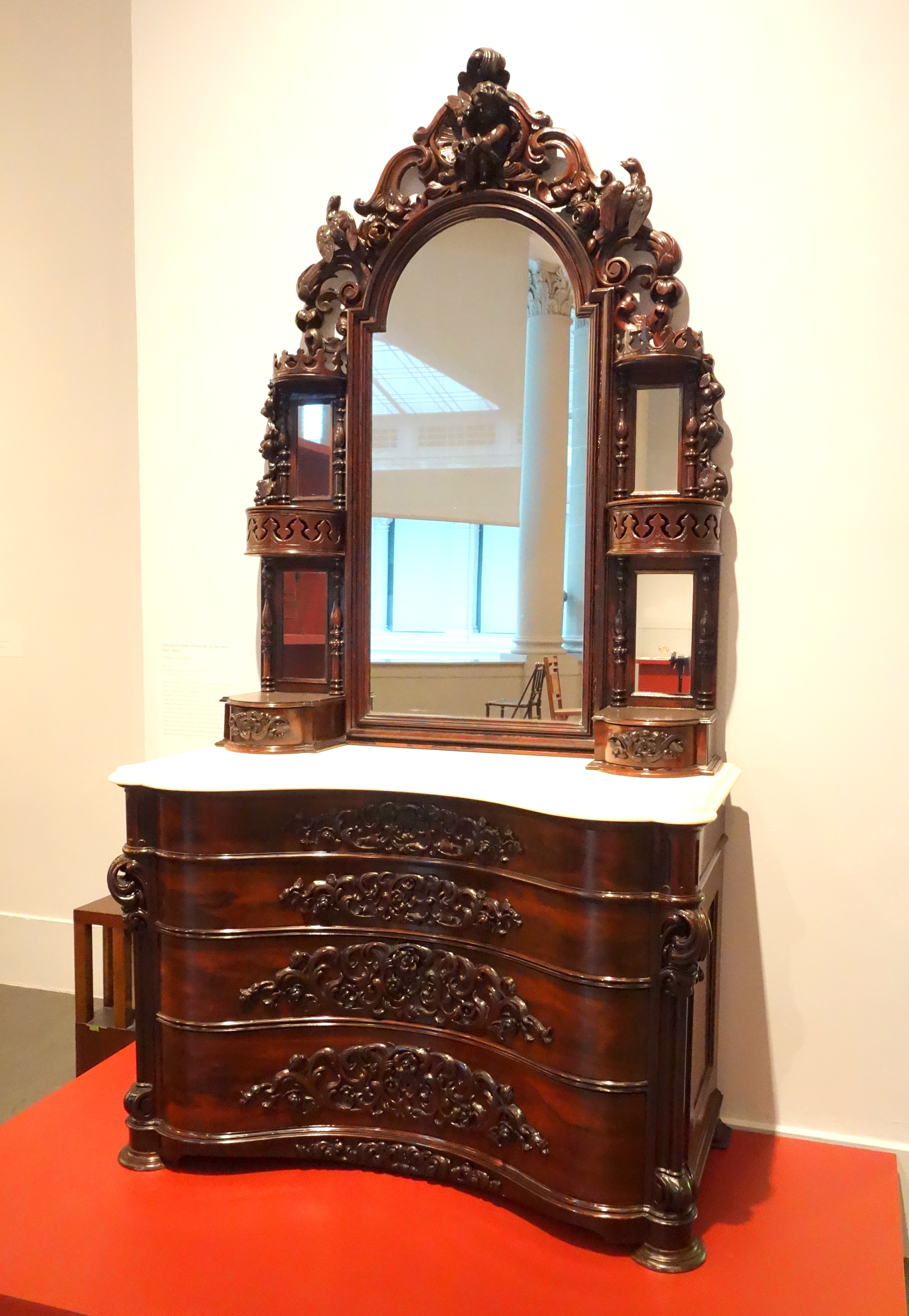
Dresser by John Henry Belter, New York, c. 1855, rosewood, other woods, mirrored glass (Brooklyn Museum).

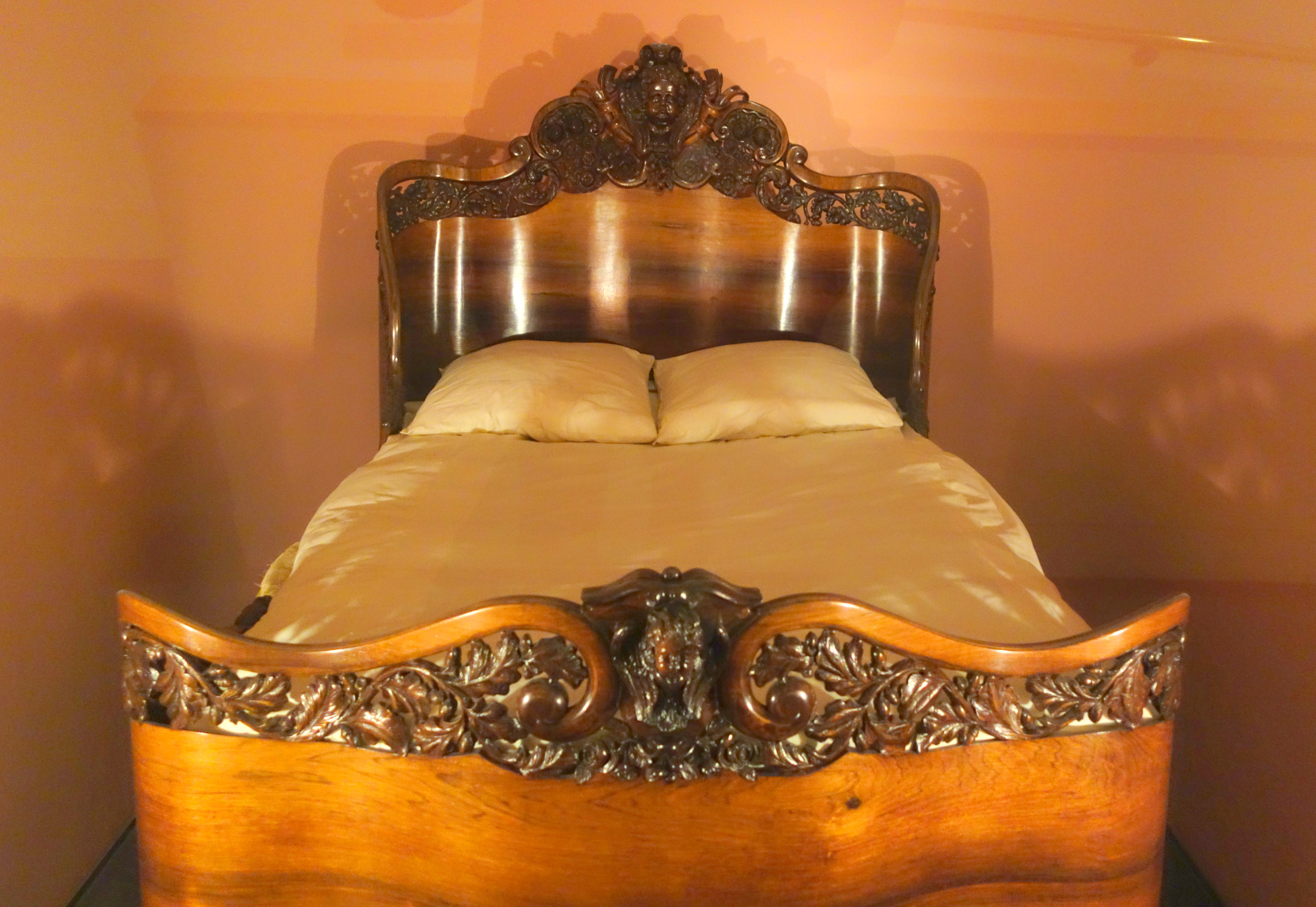
Bed by John Henry Belter, New York, patented 19 August 1856, rosewood and other woods (Brooklyn Museum).

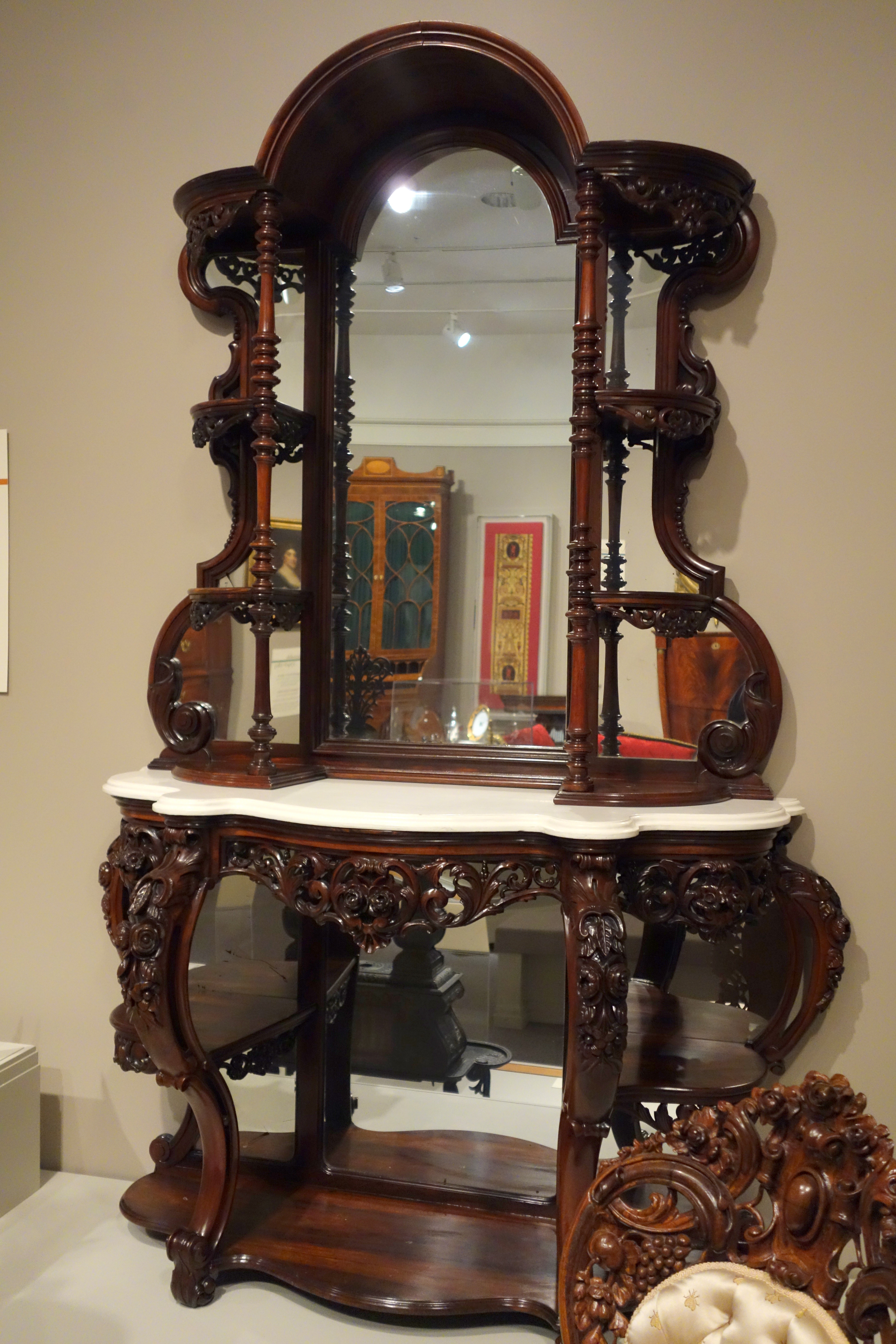
Etagere, by John Henry Belter, New York City, 1840–1860, rosewood, modern faux marble (Winterthur Museum).

John Henry Belter (1804–1863) was a famous American cabinetmaker of the Rococo Revival era. His name was commonly used as a generic term for all Rococo Revival furniture. Rosewood from Brazil and East India were favored by mid 19th-century patrons of formal furniture. Rosewood is very dense and brittle, and so rosewood furniture is very fragile and known to break under pressure. Laminated woods were a solution to this problem in manufacturing furniture with complicated designs.

As a result, Belter patented a process for making laminated furniture. Laminated wood consisted of a number of veneer sheets bound together with hot glue. The bounded sheets were then bent under steam pressure, pressed into molds, and then carved. The process produced stronger pieces of furniture that was less costly than traditional carving and allowed for mass production.

Furniture made using this process was thinner and lighter than of made of solid wood and has the same resistance to breaking. Belter produced intricate designs without use of pierced carvings (which were traditionally used at the time).

Belter's approach to Rococo includes 17th-century motifs for decoration. Carvings on 18th-century Rococo furniture pieces were simpler than the revival pieces. Carvings on 19th-century revival pieces were distinguished by defined details and clarity of the carvings.

== Gallery ==
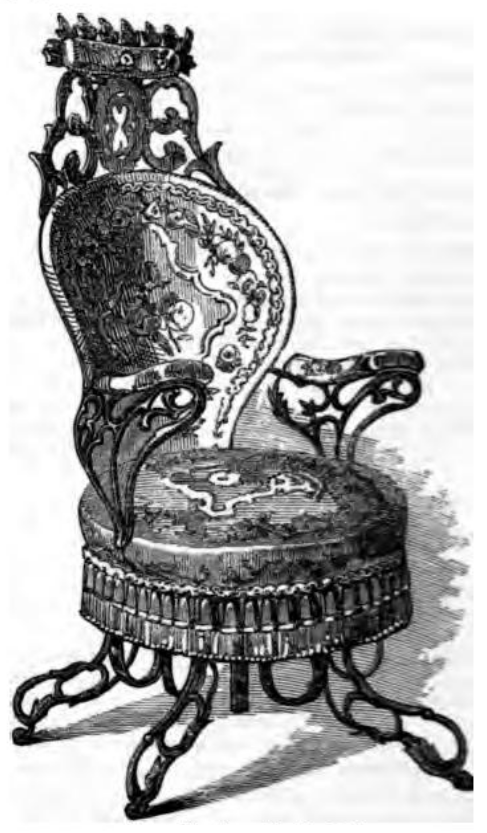
Centripetal Spring Armchair (1849) by Thomas E. Warren. Exhibited at the 1851 Crystal Palace Exposition in London.

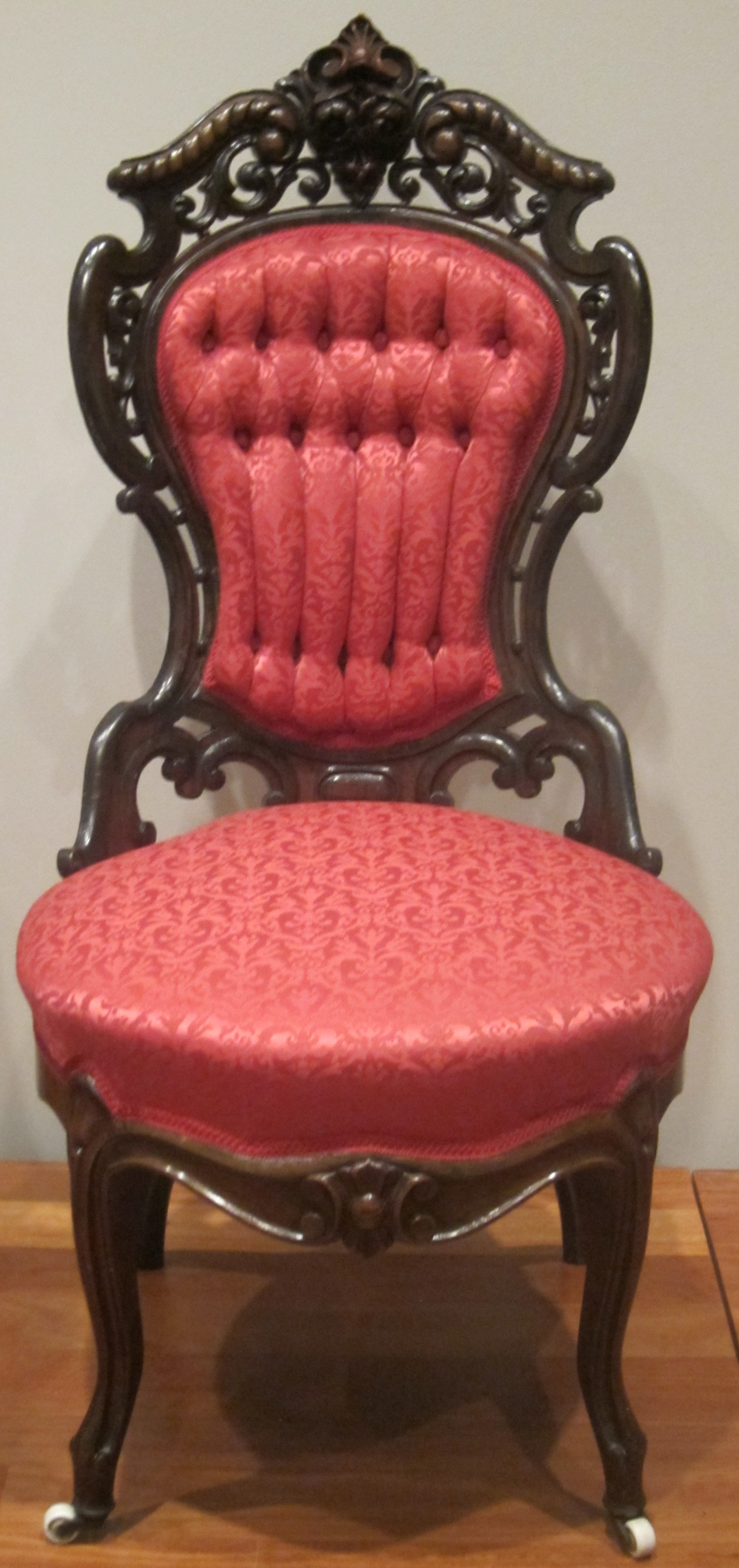
Rococo Revival chair (c. 1850–1855), by Joseph Meeks & Sons.

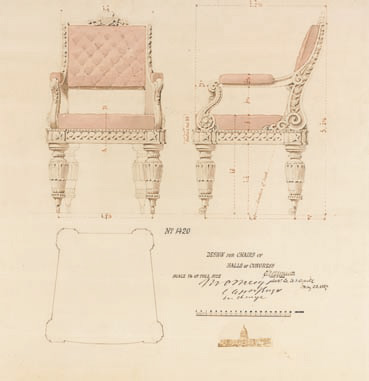
U.S. House of Representatives Chair (1857), by Thomas U. Walter.

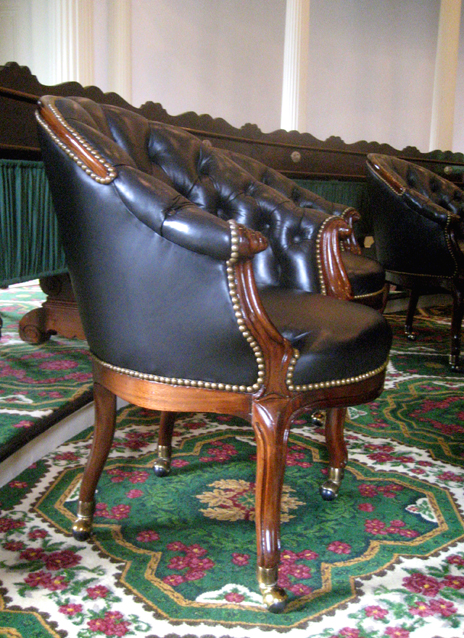
Rococo Revival Chair (c.1858), Vermont Statehouse, Montpelier, Vermont.

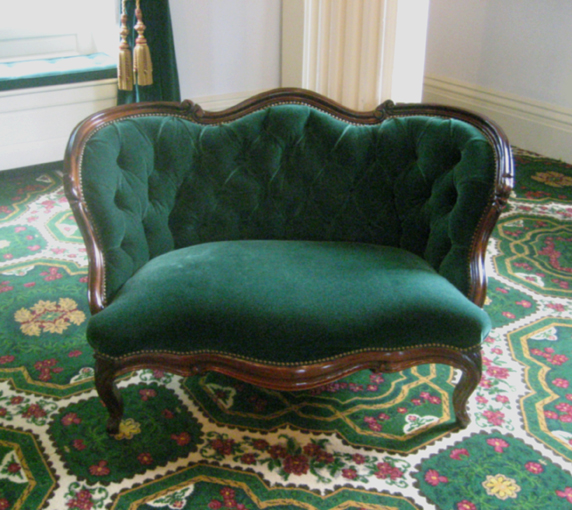
Rococo Revival Settee (c. 1859), by Blake & Davenport, Vermont Statehouse, Montpelier, Vermont.

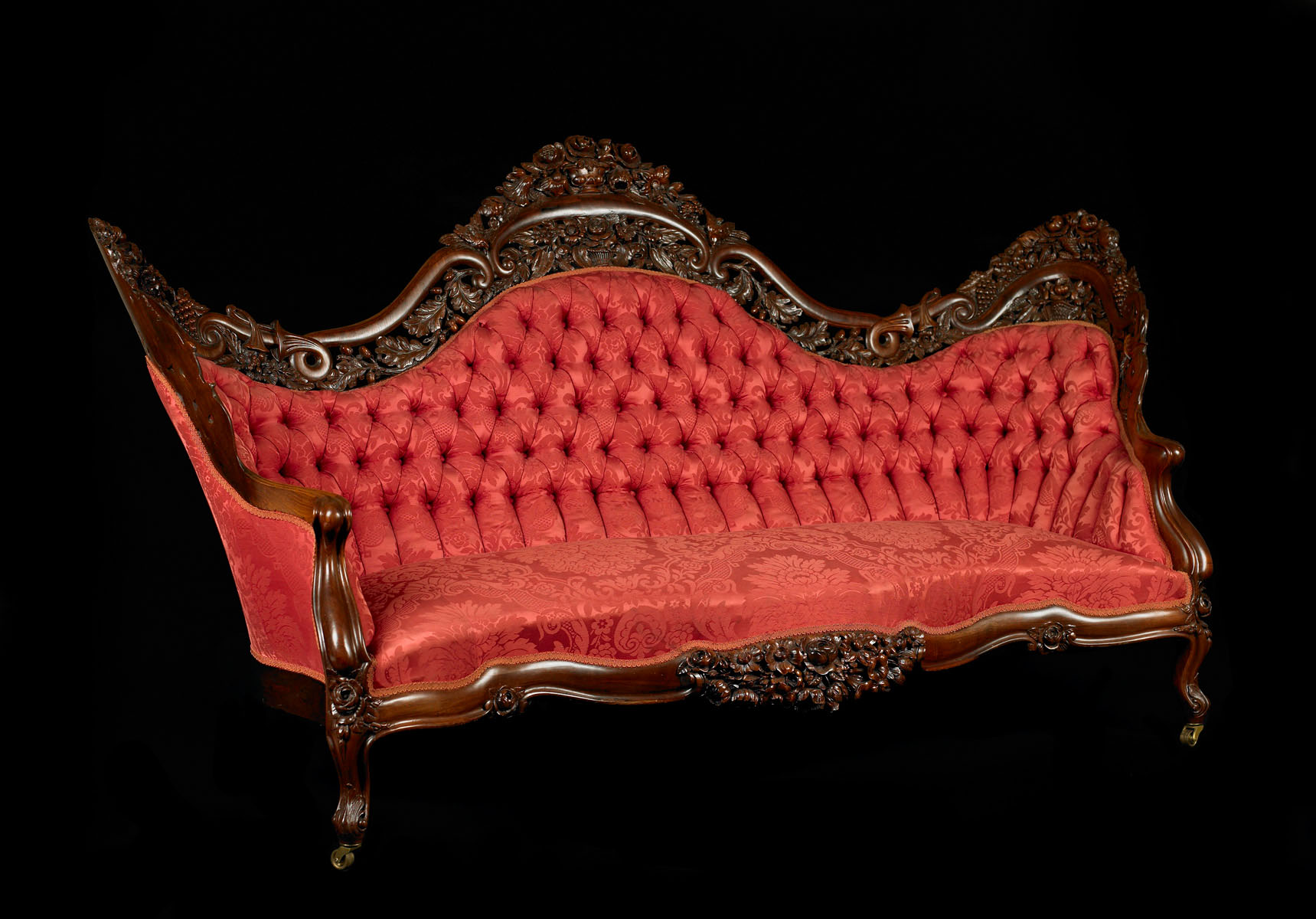
Rococo Revival Sofa (c. 1850–1855), by Belter, Birmingham Museum of Art, Birmingham, Alabama.

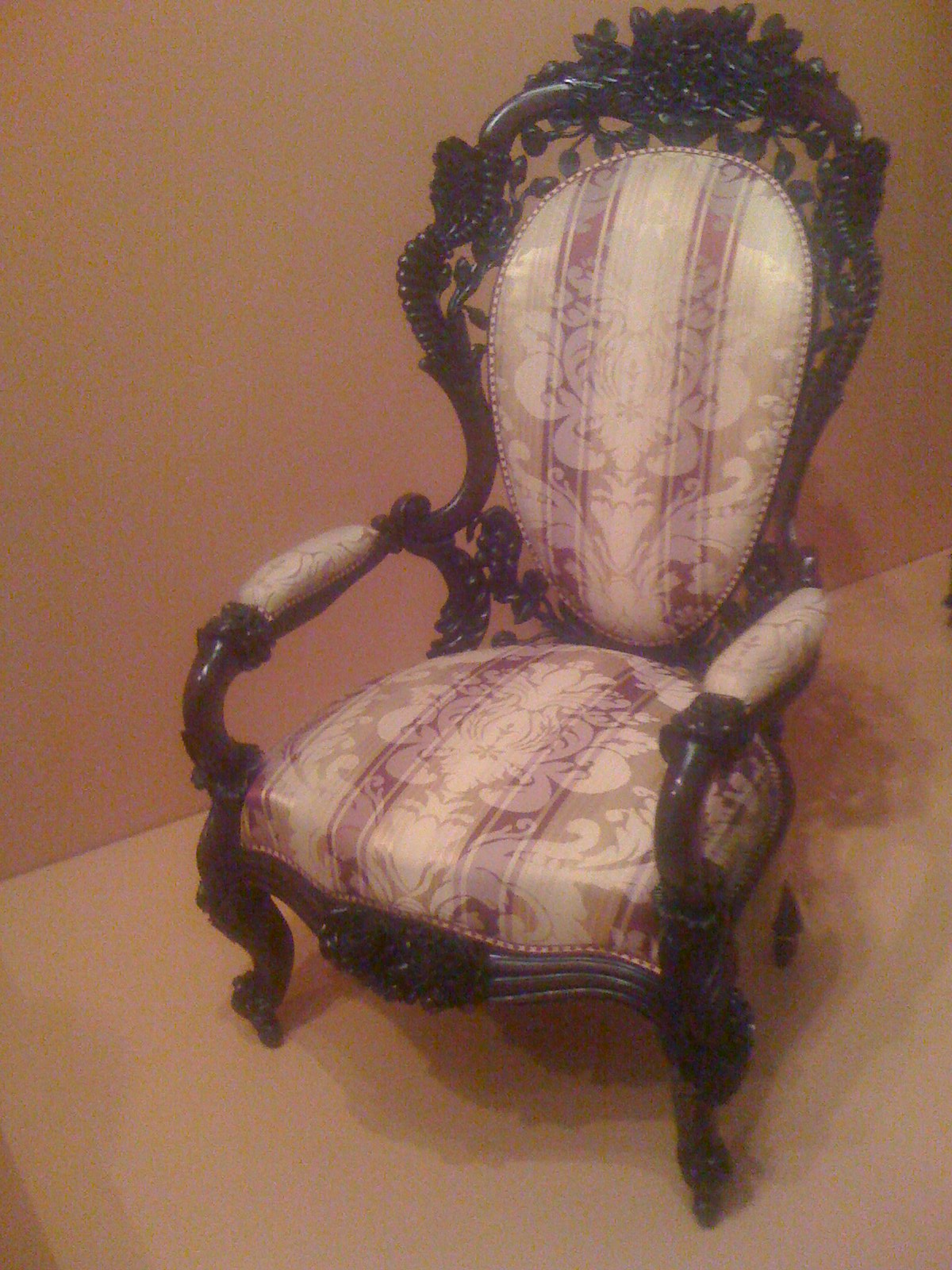
Rococo Revival Armchair (c. 1850–1863), attributed to John Henry Belter, Baltimore Museum of Art, Baltimore, Maryland.

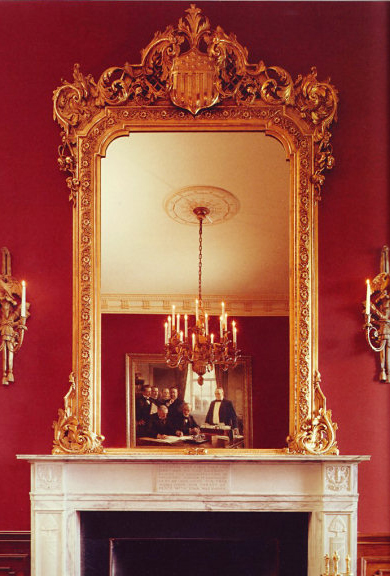
Rococo Revival Mirror (c. 1857–1860), Treaty Room, White House, Washington, D.C.

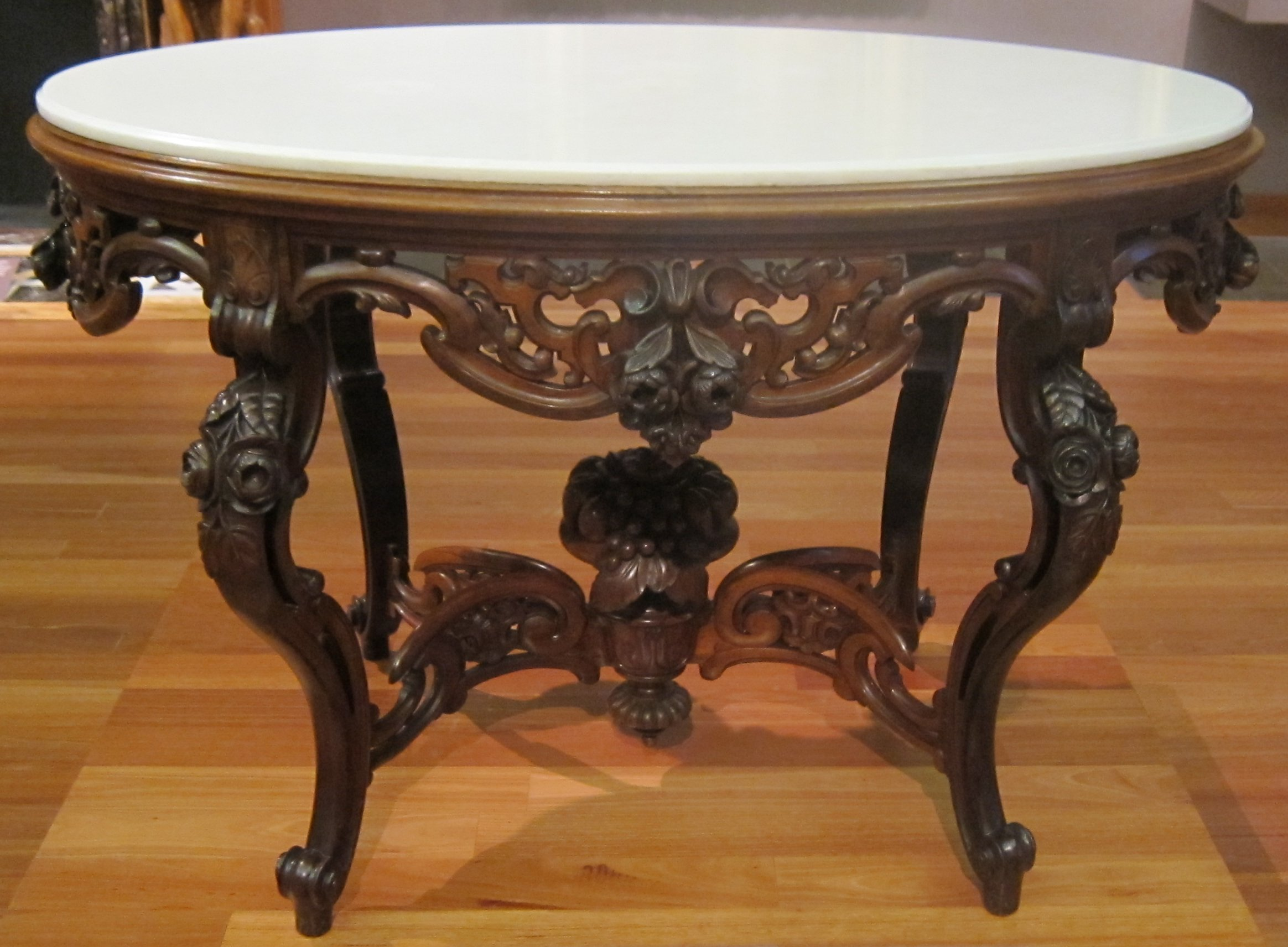
Rococo Revival table (c. 1860), by Joseph Meeks & Sons.

== Bibliography ==
- Coffin, S. (2008). Rococo: The continuing curve, 1730-2008. New York, NY: Cooper-Hewitt, National Design Museum.
- Gilbert, A. (2002). Rococo Revival Furniture Redefined by John H. Belter. Antiques & Collecting Magazine, 15–29.
- Heisner, B. (1985). The rococo: art terminology and aesthetic prejudices. SECAC Review, 10(5), 259–264.
- Igra, C. (2005). Reviving the rococo: Enterprising Italian artists in the second empire Paris. Art History, 28(3), 340–356.
- Schwartz, M., Stanek, E., & True, D. (2000). The furniture of John Henry Belter and the Rococo Revival. Edina, MN: Antiques and Books by Lise Bohm.
- Veszprémi, N. (2014). The emptiness behind the mask: the second rococo in painting and in Austria and Hungary. Art Bulletin, 96(4), 441–462.
