= John Henry Belter =

American cabinetmaker (1804–1863)

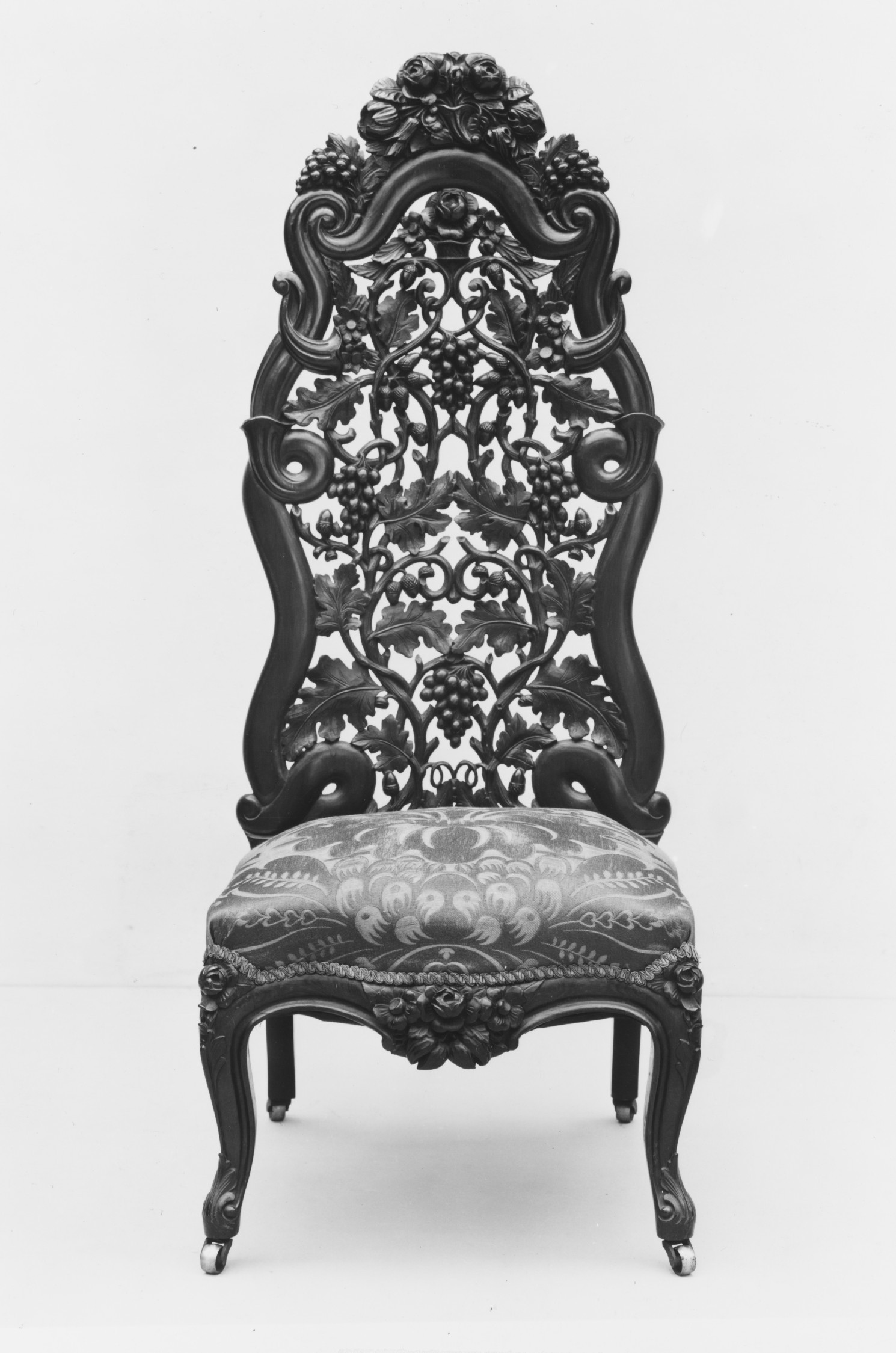
- Slipper Chair, Metropolitan Museum of Art
- Born: 1804; Hilter, Germany
- Died: 15 October 1863 (aged 58–59); New York City, U.S.

John Henry Belter (1804–1863) was an American cabinetmaker active in New York City.

Belter was born in Hilter near Osnabrück, Germany and was trained as a cabinetmaker's apprentice in Württemberg, specializing in German rococo carving, which later became popular during the Victorian era and is known today as the Rococo Revival style. He moved to New York in 1833, becoming an American citizen in 1839. His shop "J.H. Belter and Co." was located during the years 1846–1852 at nr. 372 Broadway. He is known for developing a technique for processing laminated rosewood in many layers to achieve thin panels that, once shaped in molds through steam heating, were finely carved. This style which became very popular in NYC, was widely copied by his competitors in New York, Philadelphia, and Boston.

Belter died in New York City and his business was carried on by his brothers-in-law, the Springmyers.
