= Senator Meeks =

Senator Meeks may refer to:

- James Meeks (born 1956), Illinois State Senate
- Robert Meeks (born 1934), Indiana State Senate

== See also ==
- Mariannette Miller-Meeks (born 1955), Iowa State Senate
- Senator Meeks (disambiguation)
