= Joseph Meeks =

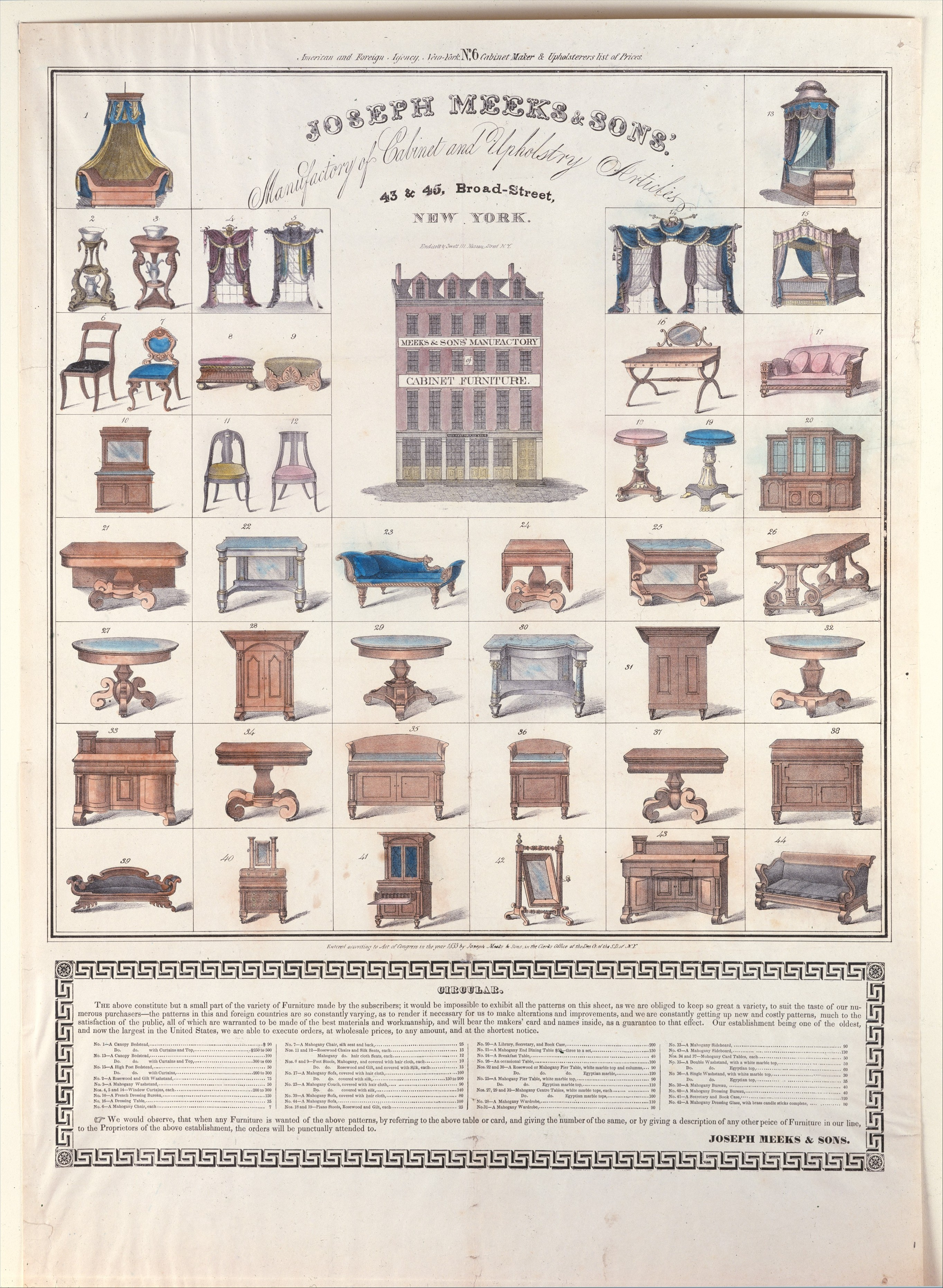
Joseph Meeks & Sons Broadside

Joseph Meeks (September 4, 1771 – July 21, 1868) was a furniture maker in New York City who founded what would become a large firm that produced good quality furniture from 1797 to 1869.

In 1833 the firm published a broadside with an illustration of the firm's building and 39 illustrations, mostly of furniture, but also of window drapery. The furniture is in simplified American Empire style. The broadside includes prices and was intended to be a catalog that consumers could use to order furniture from Meeks. Instead, judging by the large quantities of furniture in the style of the broadside either not signed or known to be by other cabinet makers (e.g. Thomas Day (North Carolina) all over the east coast of the United States, Meeks's broadside was often used by customers to specify to local cabinet makers what was wanted.

Later in Meeks's career, the firm produced Rococo Revival furniture.

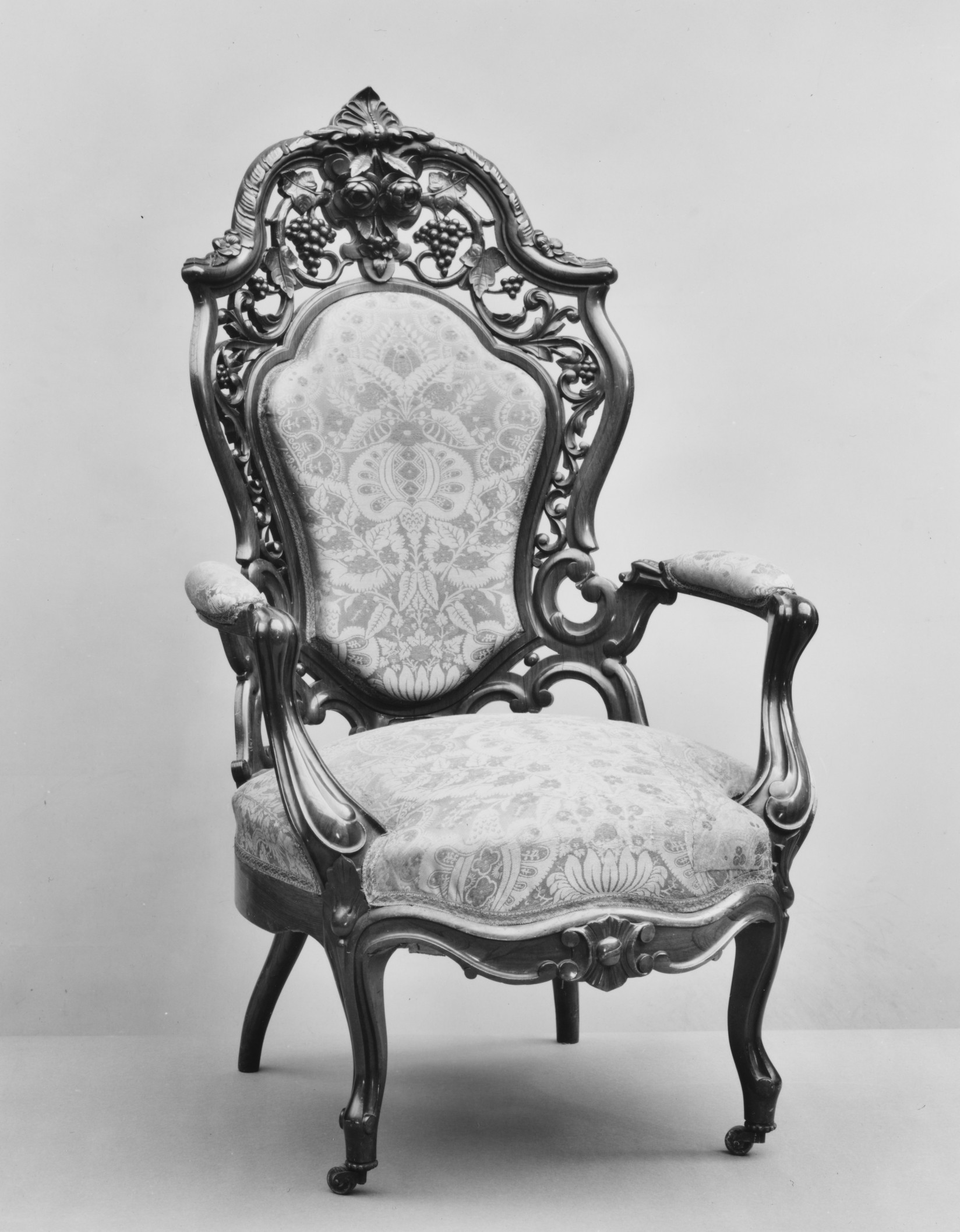
Side chair, laminated rosewood, 1859.

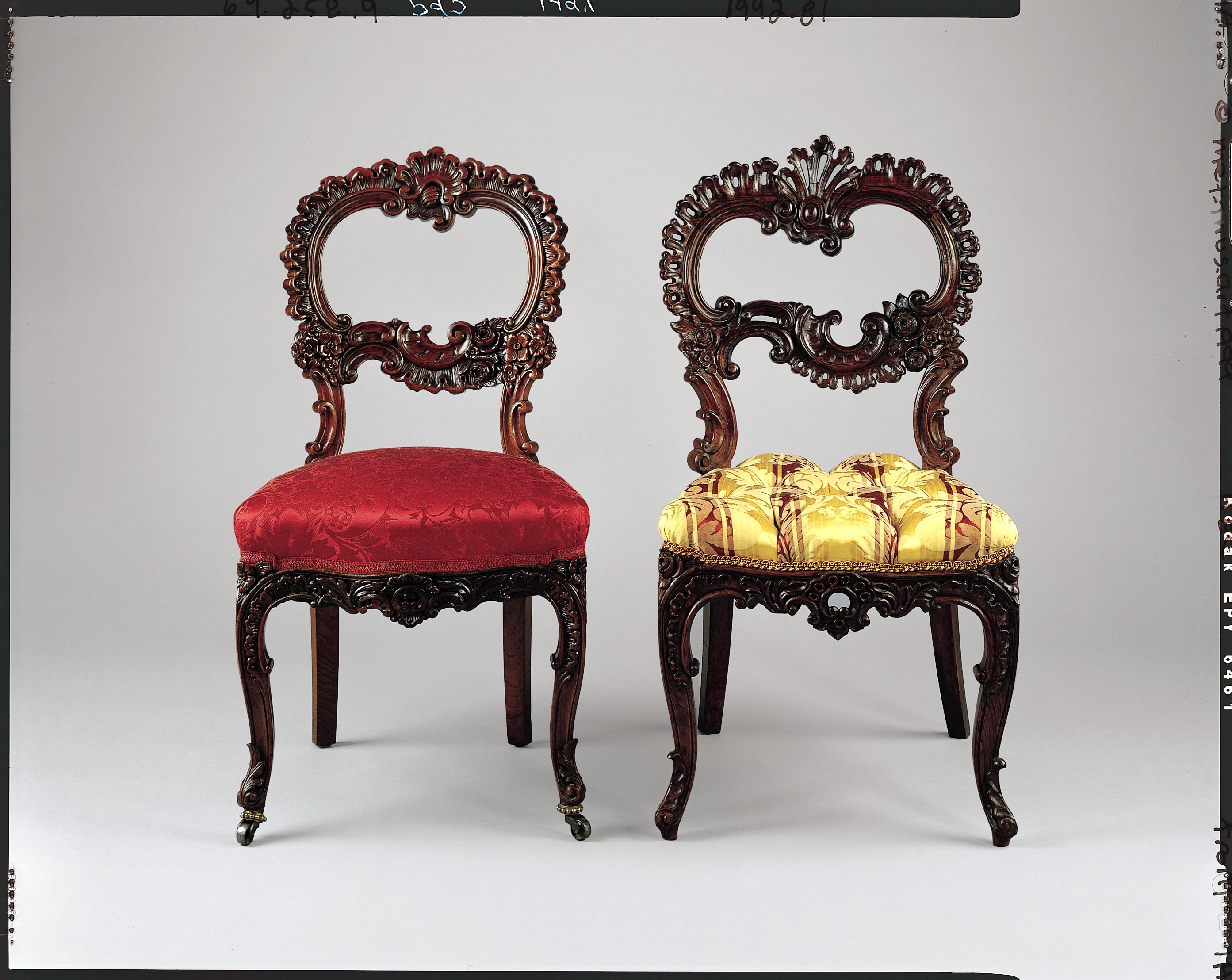
Side chairs, laminated rosewood, 1859.

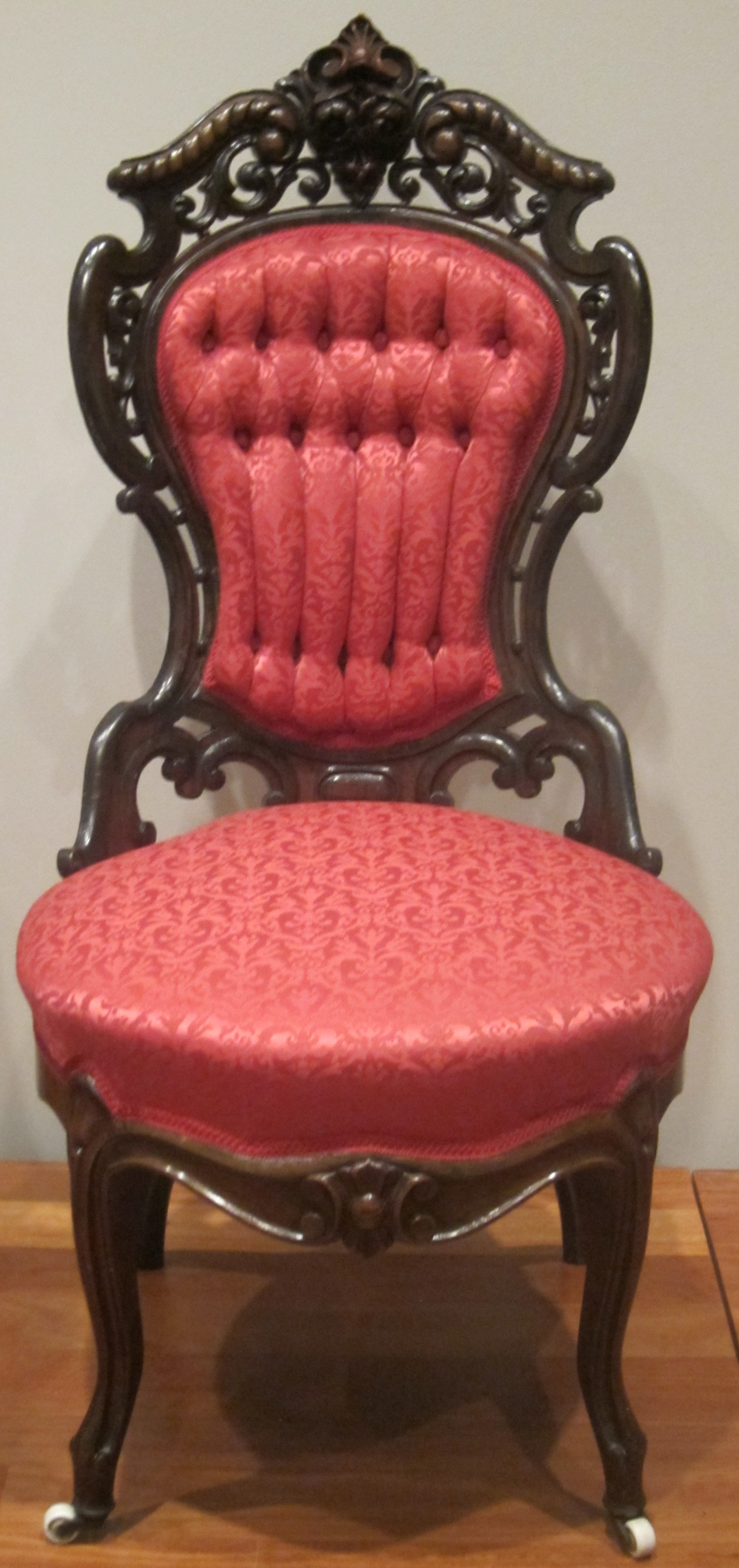
Rococo Revival chair (c. 1850–55).

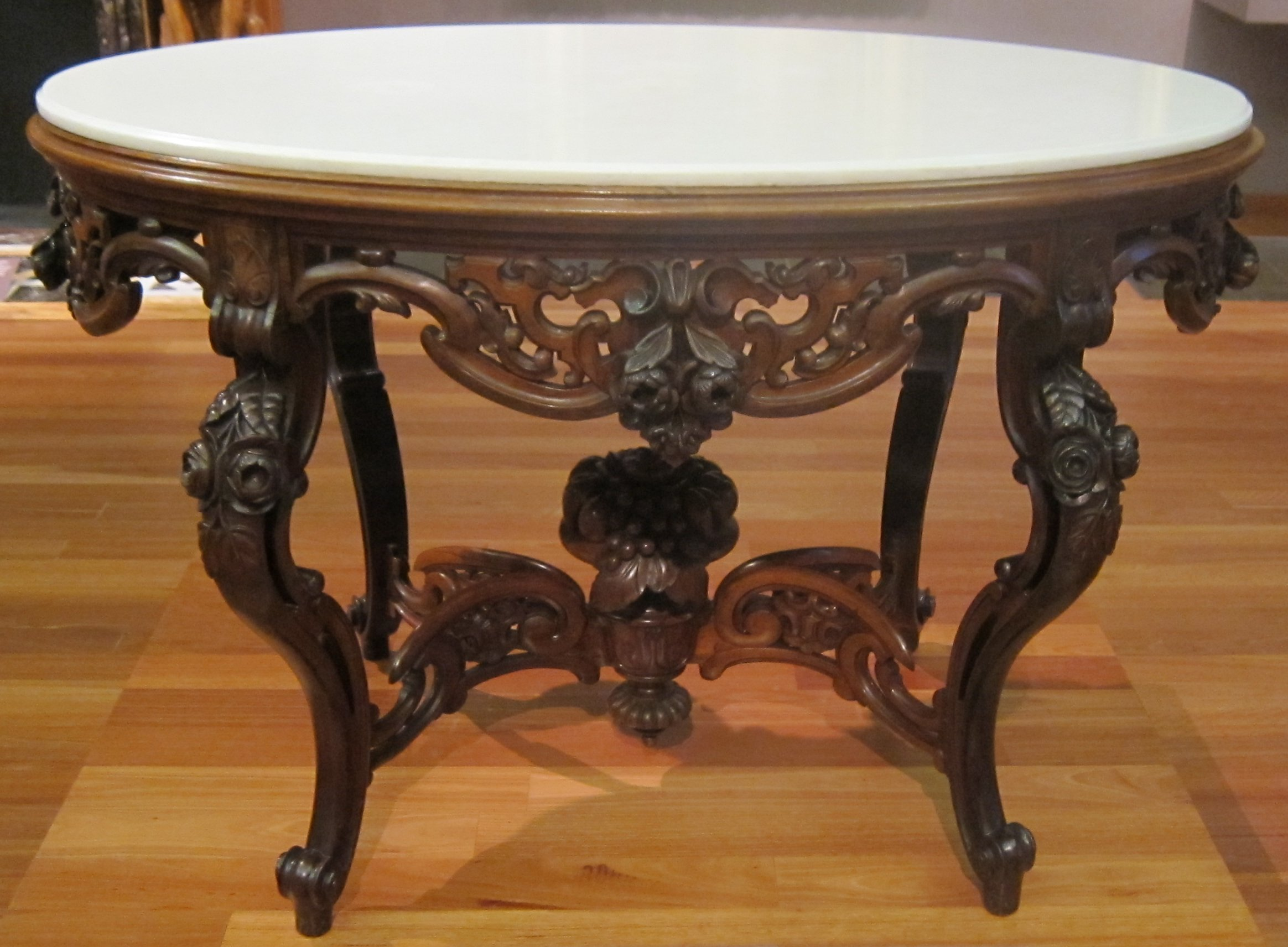
Rococo Revival table (c. 1860).

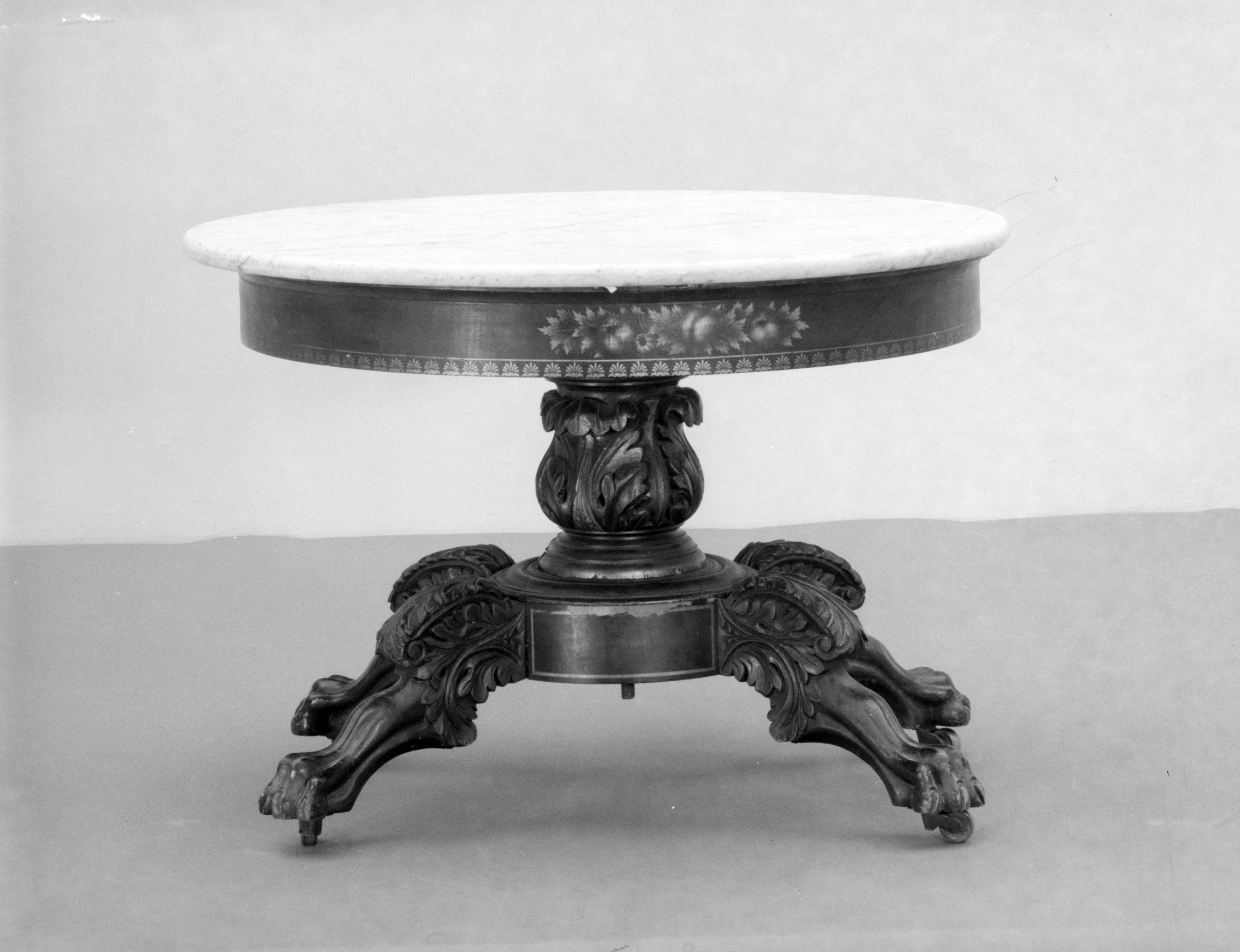
Center table, circa 1825.

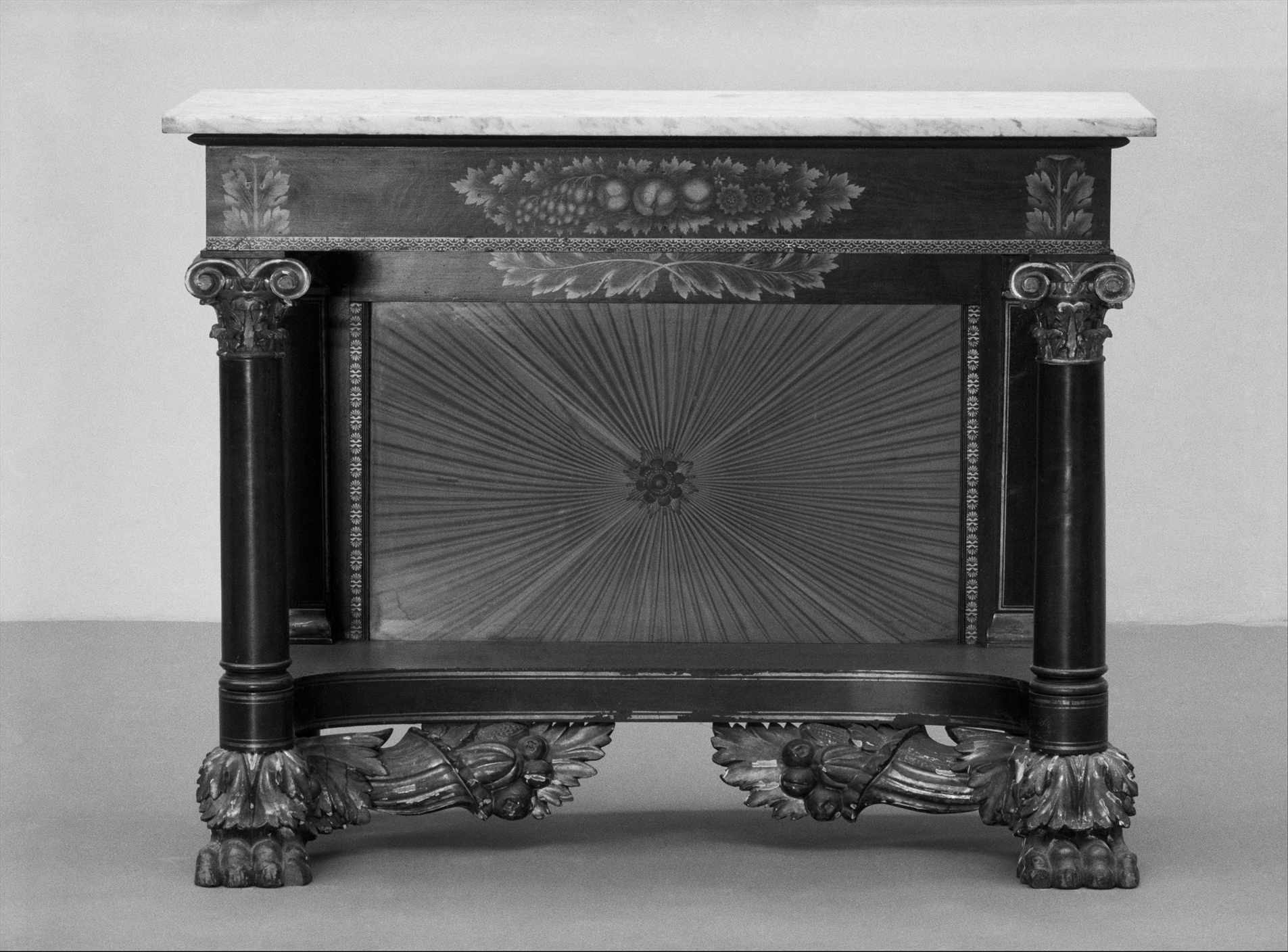
Pier table, circa 1825.

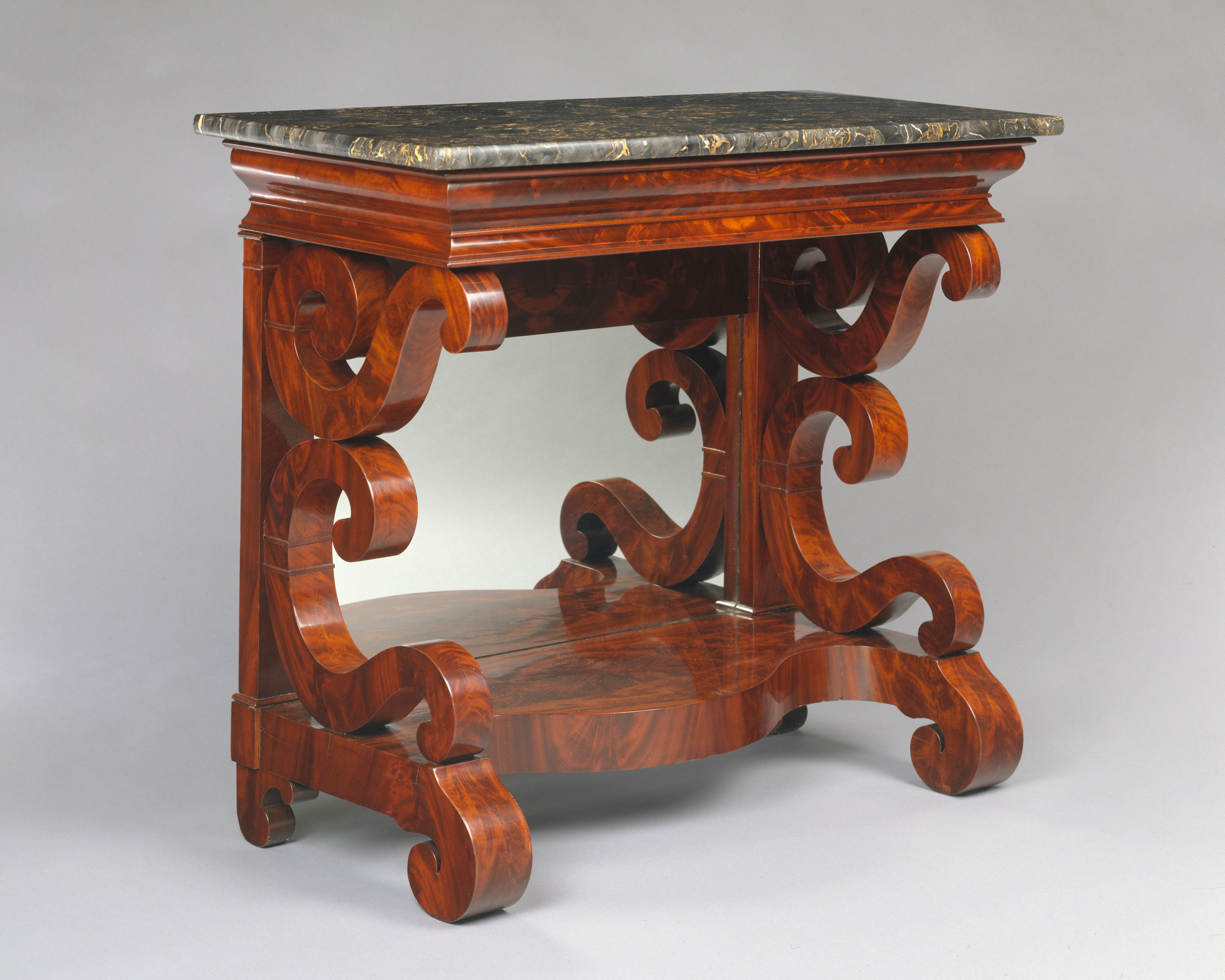
Pier table, circa 1829–1835.

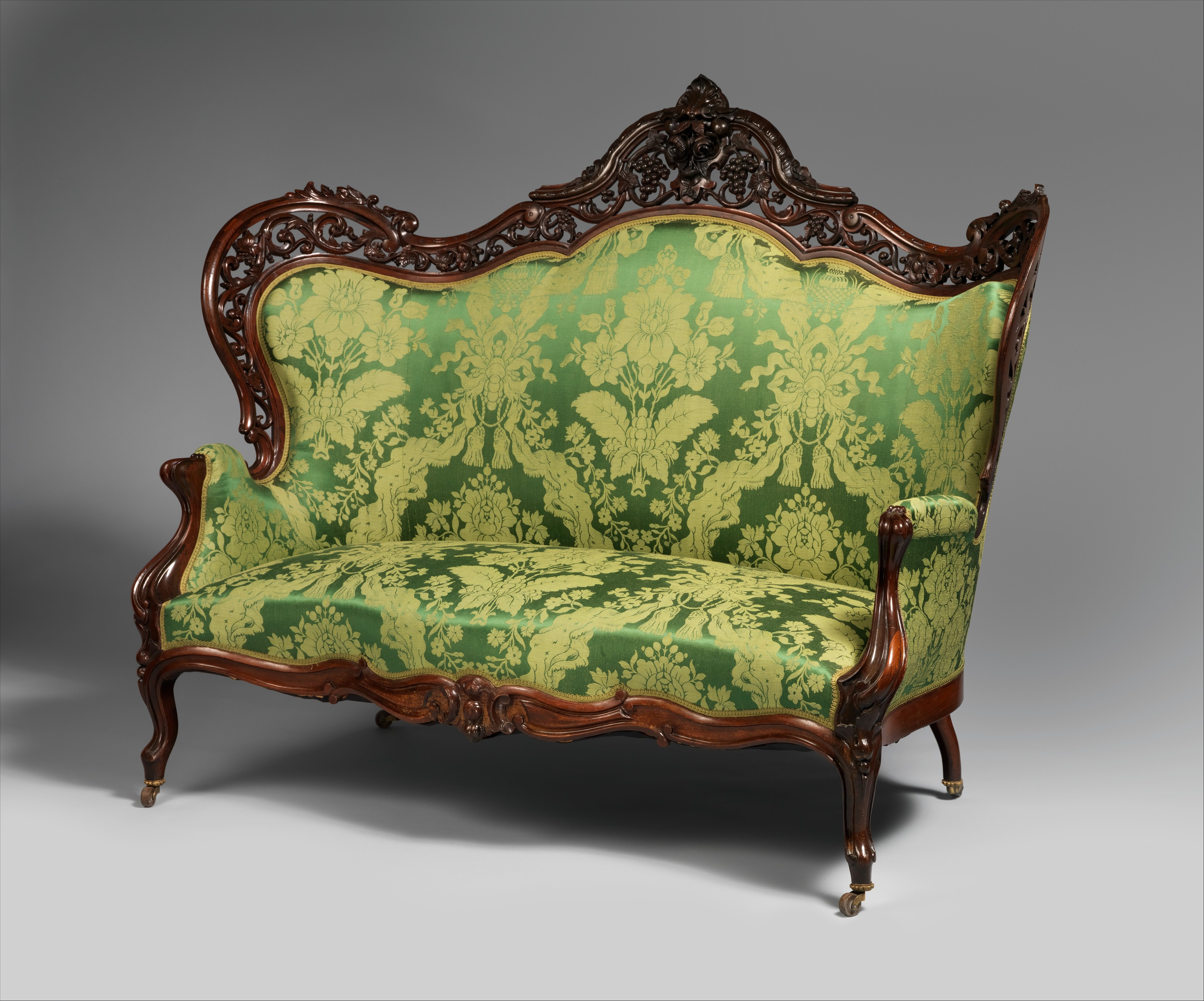
Sofa, 1859.
