= Vicki Meek =

American visual artist (b. 1950)

- Born: Victoria Susan Meek; 1950 (age 75–76); Philadelphia, Pennsylvania, U.S.
- Education: Tyler School of Art and Architecture (BFA), University of Wisconsin (MFA)
- Occupations: Visual artist, community leader
- Known for: Installation art, assemblage

Vicki Meek (née Victoria Susan Meek; born 1950) is an American visual artist, and Black community leader in Dallas.

== Biography ==
Victoria Susan Meek was born in 1950 in Philadelphia, Pennsylvania. She received her B.F.A. degree from the Tyler School of Art (now Tyler School of Art and Architecture) in Philadelphia; and her M.F.A. degree in sculpture from the University of Wisconsin in 1973.

Her work has been presented in numerous exhibitions and museums in the United States, including at: the World Expo '74, Spokane, Washington; the itinerant exhibition Forever Free: Art by African-American Women 1862-1980; the Museum of Fine Arts, Houston, Texas, and the Nasher Sculpture Center (2013-14). Meek was one of ten artists included in Nasher XChange, a public art exhibition celebrating the Nasher Sculpture Center's tenth anniversary. The Houston Museum of African American Art held a retrospective exhibition of her work in 2019-20, entitled Vicki Meek: 3 Decades of Social Commentary, which travelled to the Dallas African American Museum (2020–2021). In 2022, she has been selected as the inaugural Nasher Fellow in Urban Historical Reclamation and Recognition and as an advisor on the subsequent Fellows.

Meek received several public art commissions in Dallas, Texas where she lives and works, including three commissions with the Dallas Area Rapid Transit Art Program. She was further selected as a co-artist on the largest public art project in Dallas, namely the Dallas Convention Center Public Art Project.

Meek has received grants and awards including but not limited to: the National Endowment for the Arts NFRIG Grant; Texas Black Filmmakers Mission Award; the African American Museum at Dallas A. Maceo Smith Award for Cultural Achievement. The Art League of Houston awarded her the title of 2021 Texas Artist of the Year. In 2023, Meek received the Moss/Chumley Artist Award.

Meek was also a member of the National Conference of Artists and has taught sculpture, 3D Design, and Art History at Kentucky State University, a Historically Black College and University (HBCU). In addition, the artist is a cultural critic at Dallas Weekly and has curated over 125 art shows.

Her work is part of several permanent public collections including the African American Museum, Dallas, Texas; the Museum of Fine Arts, Houston, Texas; the Fort Wayne Museum of Art in Fort Wayne, Indiana; Serie Art Project in Austin, Texas; the Norwalk Community College, Norwalk, Connecticut; and Paul Quinn College.

== Early work ==
Her work, sometimes created from a variety of different materials including vacuum formed plastic, acrylic, latex, plexiglas, enamel and others, addresses socio-political concerns and more specifically violence in society. By experimenting with a wide range of media, the artist, as she explains in the exhibition catalog of Forever Free: Art by African-American Women 1862–1980, "I feel I minimize the risk of having my work lapse into monotony, a condition which could easily occur given the fairly rigid parameters I set for myself regarding issues to be interpreted." She often uses wall sculptures to deliver a direct message filled with political symbolism intended to educate people. "My work," Meek affirms, "is almost without exception motivated by the prevailing socio-political conditions that exist in my environment."

Set into a wooden frame, the multi-media assemblage from 1980 ...And the Lynching of the 70's Comes in the Form of a Mighty Horse, one of a total of two works included in the above mentioned exhibition, exemplifies Meek's early stylistic tendencies and thematic concerns. Her preoccupation with violence and the correlation between the man-made materials she uses and the man-made problems her images convey can also be seen in the second work was Black On Black Crime: The Violence Seems Endless..., a mixed media work from 1979.

=== Installations ===
Since the early 1980s, Meek's work has evolved from mixed-media sculpture and wall pieces into installation as social practice. These mostly site-specific works which often involve sound-elements, draw inspiration from West-African iconography and spiritual practices to develop a visual language that connects ancestral African heritage to current political events in the United States.

Using a wide range of materials and elements to create her installations, Meek evokes themes such as racism, slavery, and police brutality while providing at the same time a public space for encounters, conversations, and healing. As a form of social commentary and advocacy for black culture, her artwork emphasizes the cultural relevance of the African people, their land, space, and spiritual power as a reminder of the lost cultural memories.

The Crying Room: A Memorial to the Ancestors is a site-specific installation and a public memorial channeling the memory of the millions of ancestors who lost their lives because of slavery. As part of the Collection of the Museum of Fine Arts in Houston in Texas, this work from 1992 is conceived as a place to gather, remember, and grief. This installation evokes the cruel history of the Middle Passage through records of European slave ships as well as mathematical calculations of what slave holders estimated to be acceptable losses in human life. Several other elements address on the other hand the cultural memory carried through musical chants into the New World. An ideograph in Yoruba language symbolizes the "Lifting of the Plate" or ascension into the spiritual realm of the ancestors as a metaphor for transcendence, hope, and redemption.

== Awards, grants, and honors ==
Meek is the recipient of the 2021 Texas Artist of the Year, an honor awarded by Art League of Houston, which subsequently presented a solo-exhibition of Meeks work. In 2022, Meek was distinguished with the Nasher Sculpture Center's Fellowship to develop a site-specific public art project. During her tenure, the artist conceived and directed the Urban Historical Reclamation & Recognition Project (UHRR), to research, document, and illuminate the history of the Tenth Street Freedman's Town in Oak Cliff, a historically black neighborhood turned Historic District in southwest Dallas. Meek has been further selected as an advisor on subsequent Fellows on this program.

The artist further received the Moss/Chumley Artist Award in 2023 which distinguishes outstanding North Texas artists on an annual basis whose career span more than ten years.

== Collections ==
Vicki Meek's work is included in the collections of several museums, non profit organizations, and universities in the United States including the African American Museum, Dallas, Texas; The Museum of Fine Arts, Houston, Texas; the Fort Wayne Museum of Art, Fort Wayne, Indiana; the Norwalk Community College in Norwalk, Connecticut; Serie Project, Austin, Texas, and the Paul Quinn College, which owns a site-specific public artwork. Created in 2013 as part of the Nasher XChange exhibition, Black & Blue: Cultural Oasis in the Hills is permanently installed on the college's campus in Dallas.

== Press ==
- Fuentes, Jessica. "Meadows Museum Names Vicki Meek 2023 Moss/Chumley Artist Awardee.", April 26, 2023.
- Yancey, Robyn. "Black Chamber of Commerce Quest for Success honoree Vicki Meek shares her artwork and her story.", June 10, 2022.
- Fuentes, Jessica. "Our Favorite Art Books of the Year.", December 30, 2021.
- Hallock, Jeremy. "After decades of addressing racism and black history, Dallas artist Vicki Meek gets her first retrospective.", February 16, 2021.
- Smart, Lauren. "Artist Vicki Meek brings a tranquil and uplifting 'love letter to the Black community' to the Nasher.", February 3, 2021.
- Glentzer, Molly. "Artist Vicki Meek's Houston shows examine racist histories without apology.", January 16, 2020.
- "Editorial: City owes so much to South Dallas Cultural Center's Vicki Meek.", March 4, 2016.
