= Meeks (disambiguation) =

Meeks is a surname. It may also refer to:

- Meeks, Georgia, United States, an unincorporated community
- Meeks, Texas, United States, an unincorporated community
- Meeks Bay, California, an unincorporated community
- Meeks Creek, California, United States
- Meeks Griffin (died 1915), African-American farmer executed for murder
- "The Meeks" or "The Three Meeks", a nickname for three star basketball players on the same college basketball team: Tamika Catchings, Chamique Holdsclaw, and Semeka Randall
