= Robert Meeks =

American politician from Indiana (1934–2023)

Member of the Indiana State Senate
- In office 1988–2008
- Preceded by: John Augsburger
- Succeeded by: Marlin Stutzman

Personal details
- Born: February 3, 1934 Fort Wayne, Indiana, U.S.
- Died: April 26, 2023 (aged 89) Kendallville, Indiana, U.S.
- Party: Republican
- Spouse: Carol
- Children: four
- Occupation: Police officer

Robert L. Meeks (February 3, 1934 – April 26, 2023) was an American politician from the state of Indiana. A Republican, he served in the Indiana State Senate from 1988 to 2008. Meeks died on April 26, 2023, at the age of 89.
