= MeeK =

French-British musician

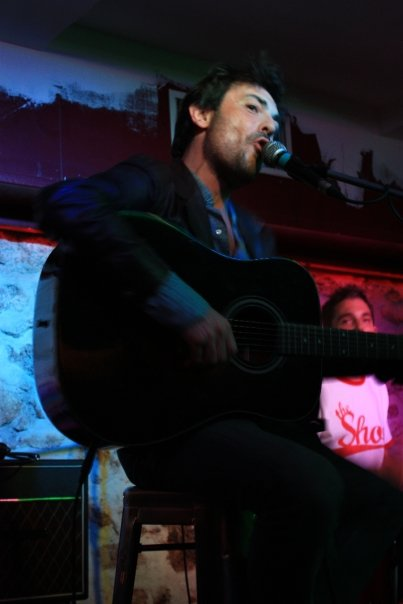
- MeeK in 2009

Background information
- Born: Stephane-Franck Pascal; 16 February 1971; Montmorency, France
- Genres: Adult contemporary, rock, pop, French pop
- Occupations: Singer, songwriter, musician, producer
- Instruments: Piano, guitar, bass, keyboard, drums, percussions
- Years active: 1996–present
- Labels: BMG, Universal, Believe Digital, Bedroom, Raindrop, Rumble
- Website: meekintheweb.net

Stephane-Franck Pascal (born 16 February 1971), known professionally as MeeK, is a French-British singer, songwriter, musician and music producer. His stage name (always spelled with a capital "M" and a capital "K") is a homage to 1960s British pop producer Joe Meek. A multi-instrumentalist, MeeK plays all the instruments on his recordings through a multitracked/multi-layered method of recording and provides all vocals including multi-layered backing harmonies.

Since his first album in 2002 and an ever strong presence on the Internet right from its very early days as a mass media, MeeK is part of the European pop/rock Indie music scene. Over the years and through word-of-mouth, some have come to consider him a "cult-artist" because of his ever dedicated worldwide fanbase, his rather non-typical and enigmatic persona and the fact that he is one of the first few artists in Europe who have pioneered in utilising the Internet as a marketing tool and a medium to publicise and/or expose their music to the general public in the late-1990s, long before the advent of social networks like MySpace, Facebook or YouTube.

== Career ==
After having briefly been a member of London-based indie acoustic-pop bands Tin Can Heart and Elsewhere in the mid-1990s, MeeK was signed as a solo songwriter by Stephane Berlow of BMG Music Publishing France in 1996.

With the encouragement and support of French actors Jean-Pierre Bacri, Agnès Jaoui and Jamel Debbouze, MeeK released his first album titled "Psychotique" (Psychotic) in 2002 on the record label Bedroom to a warm critical reception in France. The CD created what was not yet called an Internet buzz (the web still being in its infancy as a mainstream media in the early-2000s), and was well noticed in the French Indie music scene of the time. French pop artist Calogero decided to sponsor MeeK after hearing him on the radio and mistaking him for a female performer because of his rather high-pitched vocal range. Calogero then invited MeeK to perform his single "Psychotique" on "The Live Café", one of the first music programs on the French web, produced in partnership by Universal Music and NRJ Radio station. MeeK's "Psychotique" album was also released in a deluxe digipack version in Japan by Tokyo Indie record label MINF Records with an introductory essay by leader of Japanese pop group Pizzicato Five Yasuharu Konishi, drawing a comparison between the Franco-English songwriter and Paul McCartney amongst others. Since then, all MeeK albums have been released in Japan by the same record label.

In 2003, and at the request of his Japanese label, MeeK released the album "Sleeping with Big Ben" composed of fourteen Lennon-McCartney songs recorded in an all-acoustic and vocal treatment. The tribute album's release was limited to the Japanese market only and soon became a popular collectable amongst curious Beatles fans around the world. The album was finally released in a digital form worldwide in 2011.

In 2004, his second album of original songs "Margaret Et Ses Bijoux" (Margaret And Her Jewels) was released and can be defined as a concept album. It confirmed the "MeeK buzz" on the Internet and scored excited reviews in the French music press as well as on many professional music blogs.

In 2004, MeeK translated what is considered the only official "autobiography" by Paul McCartney the former Beatle wrote in collaboration with Barry Miles in 1997, "Many Years from Now", in French for Paris publisher Flammarion (French title: "Les Beatles, les Sixties & moi" – The Beatles, the '60s and Me).

In 2008, and after a two-year hiatus due to serious health concerns, MeeK recorded his third album "Sortie De Secours" (Emergency Exit) which he co-produced with Maxime Monegier Du Sorbier. Collaborating for the first time with a dozen musicians during the recording sessions, MeeK used no machines, synthesizers nor samplers at all during the album production that spanned more than 10 months. A real string section appeared on several tracks as well as a Celtic bagpipes section for the title "Je Vous Aime Immediatement".
The album lead single "Six Feet Under" is MeeK's most commercially successful hit with the single "So Fresh" so far and a nod to the HBO TV series of the same name. The single entered hundreds of campus and college radio stations playlists around the world and was the first independent music production to have cracked the Swiss state radio station Radio Suisse Romande's Top 20 while its promo video created a remarkable YouTube buzz.

In 2010, several electronic artists including The Electronic Matter, The OriginalFake and Lyhne remixed a few tracks from the "Sortie De Secours" album which were compiled on the "ElectroMeeK MySpace" parallel to the regular official Meek MySpace.

In April 2011, the album "Archives 97/07" compiling 15 unreleased tracks recorded during sessions from MeeK's four previous efforts was released in digital form worldwide.

MeeK began recording sessions for his next album in April 2011 in Paris and the album titled "Aristocracy" is an English album, co-produced by MeeK and (musicianAmerican partnership Ramses & Beaumond (group pseudonym of Christopher Hannover-Klein and Andy Ambrose),

After the successive releases of two singles, the college-radio-friendly "So Fresh" in 2012 and the cold and icy "Monolith #6" in 2013 announcing the long-awaited album, the long anticipated "Aristocracy" album was finally released worldwide on 1 April 2015. The album took five years in the making, using six different studios in Paris, London, South of France and Los Angeles. It was mastered at the legendary Abbey Road Studios in London ("Just for a laugh" said MeeK).

== Discography ==
- Psychotique (2002), Bedroom/Musicast
- Sleeping With Big Ben (2003), Bedroom/Minf Records – tribute album for Japanese market
- Margaret Et Ses Bijoux (2004), Bedroom/Musicast
- Sortie De Secours (2008), Bedroom/Raindrop/Musicast
- Archives 97/07 (2011), Bedroom/Believe Digital – compilation album
- Aristocracy (2015), Bedroom/Believe Digital

=== Singles ===
- "So Fresh"/"Back to the Monolith" (2012), Bedroom/Believe Digital
- "Monolith #6"/"Vicodin Anyone?" (2013), Bedroom/Believe Digital

== Videos ==
- So Fresh (Directors: Ramses & Beaumond)
- Monolith #6 (Directors: Ramses & Beaumond)
- Six Feet Under (Director: Emmanuel Bajolle)
- Troublemaker (Director: SFMP)
- Strawberry Fields Forever (Director: Angel)
- Le Gange Illumine (Director: Arthur Shelton)
- Elle Est Tellement Vieille Que Tous Ses Amis Sont Morts (Director: SFMP)
- Evaporée Charlotte Morphinique (Director: Saïd Boukrouna)
- Le Papillon Junkie (Director: SFMP)
- Psychotique (Director: SFMP)
- Big Fish (Big Boat) (Director: Anthony Pascal)
