= The Meek =

Webcomic

- Author(s): Der-shing Helmer
- Website: www.meekcomic.com
- Launch date: December 27, 2008

The Meek is a fantasy webcomic written and illustrated by Der-shing Helmer since 2008. Taking place in a fantasy world, The Meek focuses on protagonist Angora, a young girl with a magical ability to control plants, as she is trying to reach a place she refers to as "the center". However, The Meek follows multiple narratives with several different characters from across the world. Each chapter separately follows one of these narratives.

== Development ==
Der-shing Helmer is a trained biologist and educator, writing The Meek in her spare time. In a 2009 interview, Helmer stated she draws inspiration from biology when designing the world of The Meek. Helmer created the first draft of her webcomic entirely with a mechanical pencil and marker, but quickly switched to Photoshop CS2 for the final version. She uses a Wacom Intuos tablet to create the comic, and her creation process has become more streamlined since she built a template for her pages.

== Plot ==
The Meek follows multiple narratives with several different characters from across the world. Each chapter separately follows one of these narratives. The main characters are:

- Angora – The protagonist, an enthusiastic 15-year-old girl living alone in a jungle, aided by her plant manipulation powers, until she embarks on her quest to save the world. She has little use for clothes, and will at most wear a pair of cut-off shorts.
- Luca – An emperor and leader of a group of people called the Pasori. Murder drives him to switch from peaceful negotiation to war against another country.
- Soli – A bandit who is searching for her ex-boyfriend, so she can kill him.
- Pinter – Angora's companion, a wandering, alcoholic cartographer who meets Angora and, out of concern for her safety, travels with her.
- Rana, Suda and Hyla – Luca's children.
- Alamand – Soli's companion, a skilled young boy.

The plot of The Meek concerns a war that is brewing between several of the world's nations, notably the Carissi and the Pasori people.

== Reception ==
Caitlin Rosberg of The A.V. Club recommended The Meek as one of the best comics of 2016.

In 2017, The Meek won an Ignatz Award in the "Outstanding Online Comic" category.
