= Meekness =

Personality trait of being docile and avoiding violence

Meek is an attribute of human nature and behavior that has been defined as an amalgam of righteousness, inner humility, and patience.

Meekness has been contrasted with humility alone insomuch as humility simply refers to an attitude towards oneself—a restraining of one's own power so as to allow room for others—whereas meekness refers to the treatment of others.

== Christianity ==
Meekness, as understood in the Christian perspective, finds its embodiment in the actions and teachings of Jesus Christ. During the crucifixion, as He endured the agonizing process, Jesus exemplified meekness by uttering a prayer on behalf of His executioners: "Father, forgive them, for they do not know what they do" (Luke 23:34).

The Apostle Paul emphasized that a servant of the Lord should instruct those who are at odds with themselves in a spirit of meekness (2 Timothy 2:24–25).

Thomas Browne analogized meekness to swallowing pills without chewing. In this metaphor, meekness involves the ability to absorb and endure perceived injuries, choosing to overlook or forgive insults and offenses, rather than allowing their bitterness to endure.

In the teachings of Jesus, specifically in the Beatitudes, "the meek" are singled out for recognition. This concept aligns meekness with the classical virtue of magnanimity, a virtue admired by Aquinas. This connection highlights the dignity and strength found within meekness.

John Stott provides a modern interpretation of meekness, asserting that it represents a balance between excessive anger and complete absence of anger. Contrary to misconceptions, meekness is not synonymous with weakness; rather, it embodies the gentleness of the strong, who exercise control over their strength.

== Other traditions ==
In Buddhism, meekness is highly esteemed, with the Buddha himself appearing as the "Preacher of Meekness" in one of his past lives. An anecdote recounts how he endured the severing of his limbs by a jealous king without expressing complaint, illustrating meekness.

Taoism extols the virtues of submission and non-contention. These qualities are upheld as central tenets within Taoist philosophy, which emphasizes the importance of yielding and avoiding unnecessary conflict.

Numbers 12:3 describes Moses as an extraordinarily meek individual, surpassing all others on the earth in terms of his humility and gentleness.

Within Islam, the concept of faqr, sometimes translated as "poverty," holds a central position. It is an attribute associated with mystics, and particularly exemplified by the Prophet. The Prophet referred to faqr as his source of pride, indicating its spiritual significance. In a spiritual context, faqr entails a lack of desire for worldly wealth, recognition, or otherworldly blessings. A key aspect of faqr is the refusal to ask anything from others, as seeking from created beings conflicts with reliance on God. This refusal stems from the belief that receiving from the created would engender gratitude aimed at the giver rather than God.

== Animal analogues ==
The classical Greek word used to translate meekness was also that for a horse that had been tamed and bridled. To Buddhists, the buffalo holds a lesson in meekness.

== Literary examples ==
- Meekness is used to characterise the nature of Tess in Tess of the D'Urbervilles.
- The Heroine of Possession: A Romance judges the hero as "a gentle and unthreatening being. Meek, she thought drowsily, turning out the light. Meek."

== Criticism ==
- Beethoven rejected meekness and equality in favor of cultural elitism: “Power is the moral principle of those who excel others”.
- Nietzsche rejected meekness as part of a parasitic revolt by the low against the lofty, the manly, and the high.

== See also ==
- Gandhi – Indian independence activist (1869–1948)
- Humility – Quality of being humble
- Jesus – First-century Jewish preacher and religious leader
- Modesty – Dress or behavior to avoid sexual attraction
- Passive resistance – Act of protest through nonviolent means
- Patient Griselda – Character from European folklore
- Quakers – Christian religious movement
- Seven virtues – Seven virtues in Christian tradition
