= Collaboration =

Act of working together

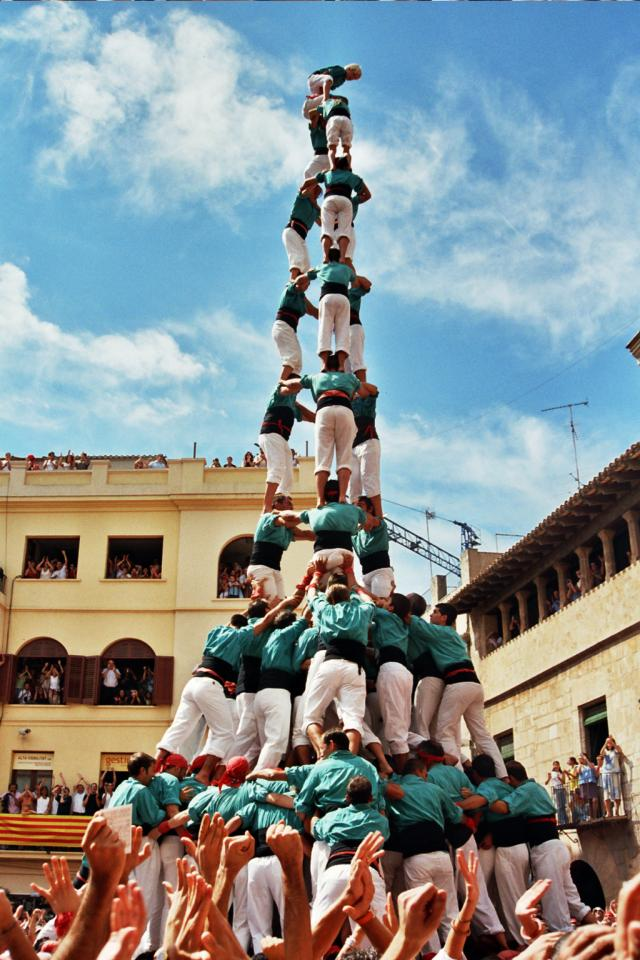
Catalan castellers collaborate, working together with a shared goal.

Collaboration (from Latin com- 'with' + laborare 'to labor, to work') is the process of two or more people, entities or organizations working together to complete a task or achieve a goal. Collaboration is similar to cooperation. The form of leadership can be social within a decentralized and egalitarian group. Teams that work collaboratively often access greater resources, recognition and rewards when facing competition for finite resources.

Structured methods of collaboration encourage introspection of behavior and communication. Such methods aim to increase the success of teams as they engage in collaborative problem-solving. Collaboration is present in opposing goals exhibiting the notion of adversarial collaboration, though this is not a common use of the term. In its applied sense, "[a] collaboration is a purposeful relationship in which all parties strategically choose to cooperate in order to accomplish a shared outcome". Trade between nations is a form of collaboration between two societies which produce and exchange different portfolios of goods.

== Historical examples ==
=== Trade ===
Trade began in prehistoric times and continues because it benefits all of its participants. Prehistoric peoples bartered goods and services with each other without a modern currency. Peter Watson dates the history of long-distance commerce from circa 150,000 years ago. Trade exists because different communities have a comparative advantage in the production of tradable goods.

=== Roman Empire ===
The Roman Empire used collaboration through ruling with visible control, which lasted from 31BC until (in the east) 1453CE, across around fifty countries. The growth of trade was supported by the stable administration of the Romans. Evidence shows that the Roman Empire and Julius Caesar were influenced by the Greek writer Xenophon's The Education of Cyrus on leadership. This says that 'social bonds, not command and control, were to be the primary mechanisms of governance'. Classics professor Emma Dench notes that the Roman Empire extended its citizenship "to enemies, former enemies of state, to people who'd helped them. The Romans were incredibly good at co-opting people and ideas." The Romans created a stable empire that benefitted both ruled and allied countries. Gold and silver were currencies created by the Romans which supported a market economy, leading to trading within the Roman Empire and taxes.

=== Hutterite, Austria (founded 16th century) ===
In Hutterite communities housing units are built and assigned to individual families, but belong to the colony with little personal property. Meals are taken by the entire colony in a common long room.

=== Oneida Community, Oneida, New York (1848) ===
The Oneida Community practiced Communalism (in the sense of communal property and possessions) and Mutual Criticism, where every member of the community was subject to criticism by committee or the community as a whole, during a general meeting. The goal was to remove bad character traits.

=== Kibbutzim (1890) ===
A kibbutz is an Israeli collective community. The movement combines socialism and Zionism seeking a form of practical Labor Zionism. Choosing communal life, and inspired by their own ideology, kibbutz members developed a communal mode of living. The kibbutzim lasted for several generations as utopian communities, although most became capitalist enterprises and regular towns.

=== Manhattan Project ===
The Manhattan Project was a collaborative project during World War II among the Allies that developed the first atomic bomb. It was a collaborative effort by the United States, the United Kingdom and Canada.

The value of this project as an influence on organized collaboration is attributed to Vannevar Bush. In early 1940, Bush lobbied for the creation of the National Defense Research Committee. Frustrated by previous bureaucratic failures in implementing technology in World War I, Bush sought to organize the scientific power of the United States for greater success.

The project succeeded in developing and detonating three nuclear weapons in 1945: a test detonation of a plutonium implosion bomb on July 16 (the Trinity test) near Alamogordo, New Mexico; an enriched uranium bomb code-named "Little Boy" on August 6 over Hiroshima, Japan; and a second plutonium bomb, code-named "Fat Man" on August 9 over Nagasaki, Japan.

== Contemporary examples ==
=== Community organization: intentional communities ===
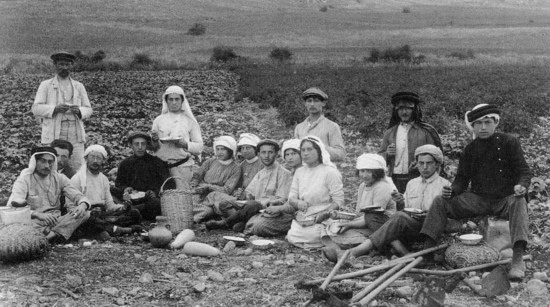
Organization and cooperation between community members provides economic and social benefits.

The members of an intentional community typically hold a common social, political or spiritual vision. They share responsibilities and resources. Intentional communities include cohousing, residential land trusts, ecovillages, communes, kibbutzim, ashrams, and housing cooperatives. Typically, new members of an intentional community are selected by the community's existing membership, rather than by real estate agents or land owners (if the land is not owned by the community).

=== Indigenous collaboration ===
Collaboration in indigenous communities, particularly in the Americas, often involves the entire community working toward a common goal in a horizontal structure with flexible leadership. Children in some indigenous American communities collaborate with the adults. Children can be contributors in the process of meeting objectives by taking on tasks that suit their skills.

Indigenous learning techniques comprise Learning by Observing and Pitching In. For example, a study of Mayan fathers and children with traditional Indigenous ways of learning worked together in collaboration more frequently when building a 3D model puzzle than Mayan fathers with western schooling. Also, Chillihuani people of the Andes value work and create work parties in which members of each household in the community participate. Children from indigenous-heritage communities want to help around the house voluntarily.

In the Mazahua Indigenous community of Mexico, school children show initiative and autonomy by contributing in their classroom, completing activities as a whole, assisting and correcting their teacher during lectures when a mistake is made. Fifth and sixth graders in the community work with the teacher installing a classroom window; the installation becomes a class project in which the students participate in the process alongside the teacher. They all work together without needing leadership, and their movements are all in sync and flowing. It is not a process of instruction, but rather a hands-on experience in which students work together as a synchronous group with the teacher, switching roles and sharing tasks. In these communities, collaboration is emphasized, and learners are trusted to take initiative. While one works, the other watches intently and all are allowed to attempt tasks with the more experienced stepping in to complete more complex parts, while others pay close attention.

=== Game theory ===
Game theory is a branch of applied mathematics, computer science, and economics that looks at situations where multiple players make decisions in an attempt to maximize their returns. The first documented discussion of game theory is in a letter written by James Waldegrave, 1st Earl Waldegrave in 1713. Antoine Augustin Cournot's Researches into the Mathematical Principles of the Theory of Wealth in 1838 provided the first general theory. In 1928 it became a recognized field when John von Neumann published a series of papers. Von Neumann's work in game theory culminated in the 1944 book The Theory of Games and Economic Behavior by von Neumann and Oskar Morgenstern.

=== Military-industrial complex ===
The term military-industrial complex refers to a close and symbiotic relationship among a nation's armed forces, its private industry, and associated political interests. In such a system, the military is dependent on industry to supply material and other support, while the defence industry depends on government for revenue.

=== Skunk Works ===
Skunk Works is a term used in engineering and technical fields to describe a group within an organization given a high degree of autonomy unhampered by bureaucracy, tasked with advanced or secret projects. One such group was created at Lockheed in 1943. The team developed highly innovative aircraft in short time frames, notably beating its first deadline by 37 days.

=== Project management ===
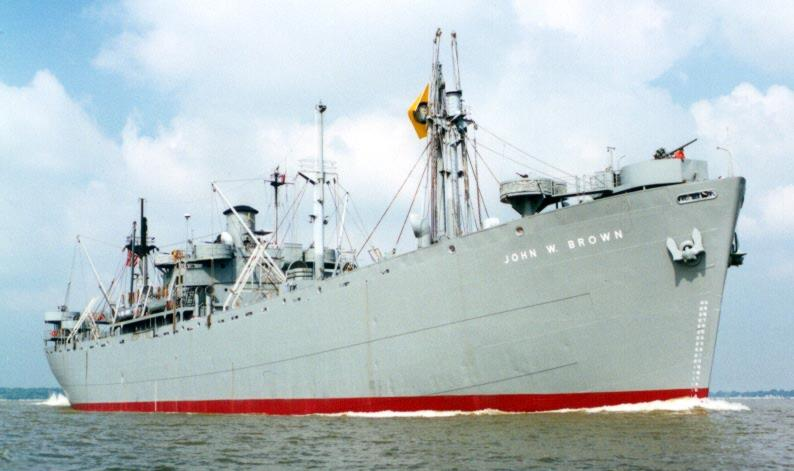
The 2,751 Liberty ships built in four years by the United States during World War II required new approaches in organization and manufacturing.

As a discipline, project management developed from different fields including construction, engineering and defense. In the United States, the forefather of project management is Henry Gantt, who is known for his use of the "bar" chart as a project management tool, for being an associate of Frederick Winslow Taylor's theories of scientific management, and for his study of the management of Navy ship building. His work is the forerunner to many modern project management tools including the work breakdown structure (WBS) and resource allocation.

The 1950s marked the beginning of the modern project management era. Again, in the United States, prior to the 1950s, projects were managed on an ad hoc basis using mostly Gantt charts, and informal techniques and tools. At that time, two mathematical project scheduling models were developed: (1) the "Program Evaluation and Review Technique" or PERT, developed as part of the United States Navy's (in conjunction with the Lockheed Corporation) Polaris missile submarine program; and (2) the "Critical Path Method" (CPM) developed in a joint venture by both DuPont Corporation and Remington Rand Corporation for managing plant maintenance projects. These mathematical techniques quickly spread into many private enterprises.

In 1969, the Project Management Institute (PMI) was formed to serve the interest of the project management industry. The premise of PMI is that the tools and techniques of project management are common even among the widespread application of projects from the software industry to the construction industry. In 1981, the PMI Board of Directors authorized the development of what has become A Guide to the Project Management Body of Knowledge (PMBOK), standards and guidelines of practice that are widely used throughout the profession. The International Project Management Association (IPMA), founded in Europe in 1967, has undergone a similar development and instituted the IPMA Project Baseline. Both organizations are now participating in the development of a global project management standard.

However, the exorbitant cost overruns and missed deadlines of large-scale infrastructure, military R&D/procurement and utility projects in the US demonstrates that these advances have not been able to overcome the challenges of such projects.

=== Academia ===
==== Black Mountain College ====
Founded in 1933 by John Andrew Rice, Theodore Dreier and other former faculty of Rollins College, Black Mountain College was experimental by nature and committed to an interdisciplinary approach, attracting a faculty which included leading visual artists, poets and designers.

Operating in a relatively isolated rural location with little budget, Black Mountain fostered an informal and collaborative spirit. Innovations, relationships and unexpected connections formed at Black Mountain had a lasting influence on the postwar American art scene, high culture and eventually pop culture. Buckminster Fuller met student Kenneth Snelson at Black Mountain, and the result was the first geodesic dome (improvised out of slats in the school's back yard); Merce Cunningham formed his dance company; and John Cage staged his first happening.

Black Mountain College was a liberal arts school that grew out of the progressive education movement. In its day it was a unique educational experiment for the artists and writers who conducted it and was an incubator for the American avant garde.

==== Learning ====
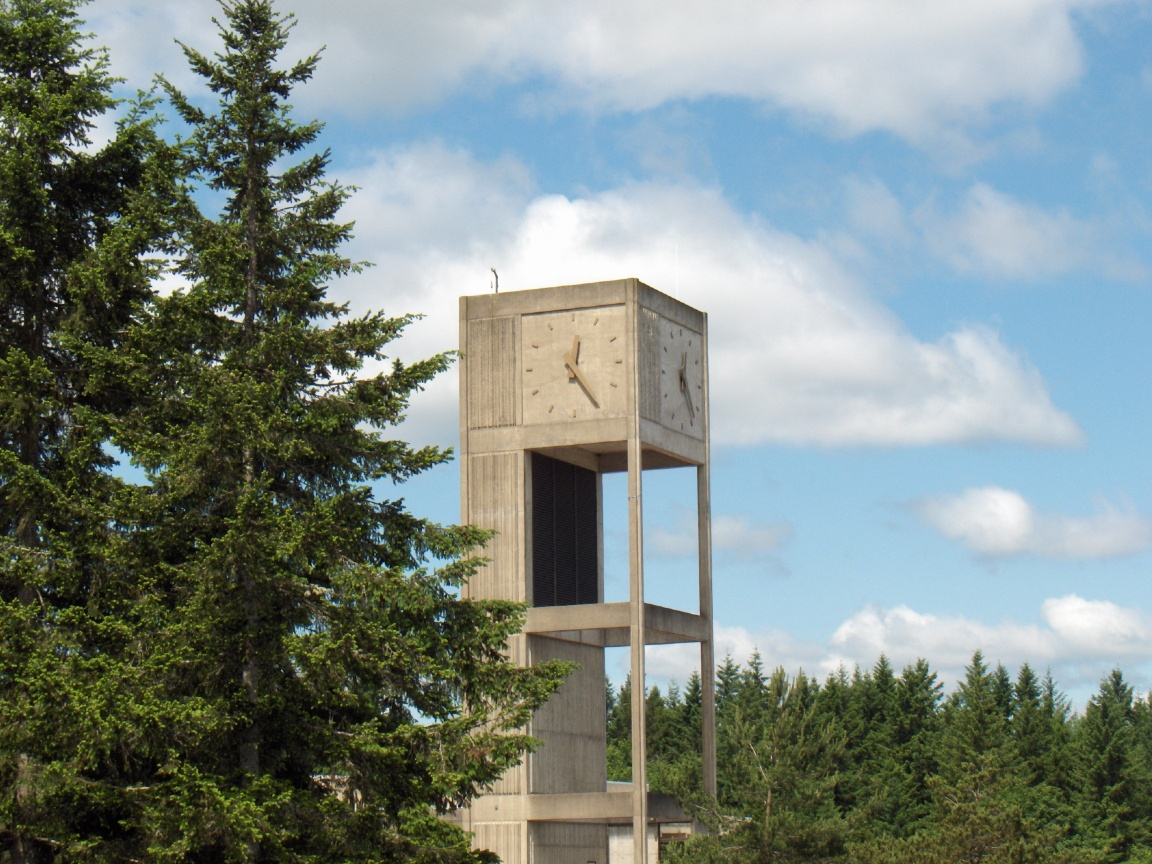
The Evergreen signature clock tower

Dr. Wolff-Michael Roth and Stuart Lee of the University of Victoria assert that until the early 1990s the individual was the 'unit of instruction' and the focus of research. The two observed that researchers and practitioners switched to the idea that "knowing" is better thought of as a cultural practice. Roth and Lee also claim that this led to changes in learning and teaching design in which students were encouraged to share their ways of doing mathematics, history, science, with each other. In other words, that children take part in the construction of consensual domains, and 'participate in the negotiation and institutionalization of ... meaning'. In effect, they are participating in learning communities.

This analysis does not consider the appearance of Learning communities in the United States in the early 1980s. For example, The Evergreen State College, which is widely considered a pioneer in this area, established an intercollegiate learning community in 1984. In 1985, the college established The Washington Center for Improving the Quality of Undergraduate Education, which focuses on collaborative education approaches, including learning communities as one of its centerpieces. The school later became notorious for less-successful collaborations.

== Occupational examples ==
=== Arts ===
==== Figurative arts ====
The romanticized notion of a lone, genius artist has existed since the time of Giorgio Vasari's Lives of the Artists, published in 1568. Vasari promulgated the idea that artistic skill was endowed upon chosen individuals by gods, which created an enduring and largely false popular misunderstanding of many artistic processes. Artists have used collaboration to complete large scale works for centuries, but the myth of the lone artist was not widely questioned until the 1960s and 1970s.

Collaborative art groups include:

- Dada (1913)
- Fluxus (1957)
- Situationist International (1957)
- Experiments in Art and Technology (1967)
- Mujeres Muralistas (1973)
- Colab (1977)
- Guerrilla Girls (1985)
- SITO (1993)

==== Ballet ====
Ballet is a collaborative art form. It entails music, dancers, costumes, a venue, lighting, etc. Hypothetically, one person could control all of this, but most often every work of ballet is the by-product of collaboration. From the earliest formal works of ballet, to the great 19th century masterpieces of Pyotr Tchaikovsky and Marius Petipa, to the 20th century masterworks of George Balanchine and Igor Stravinsky, to today's ballet companies, feature strong collaborative connections between choreographers, composers and costume designers are essential. Within dance as an art form, there is also the collaboration between choreographer and dancer. The choreographer creates a movement in her/his head and then physically demonstrates the movement to the dancer, which the dancer sees and attempts to either mimic or interpret.

==== Music ====
Musical collaboration occurs when musicians in different places or groups work on the piece. Typically, multiple parties are involved (singers, songwriters, lyricists, composers, and producers) and come together to create one work. A contemporary example is the song "FourFiveSeconds". This single represents a type of collaboration because it was developed by pop idol Rihanna, Paul McCartney (former bassist, composer and vocalist for The Beatles), and rapper/composer Kanye West. Websites and software facilitate musical collaboration over the Internet, resulting in the emergence of online bands.

Several awards exist specifically for collaboration in music:

- Grammy Award for Best Country Collaboration with Vocals—awarded since 1988
- Grammy Award for Best Pop Collaboration with Vocals—awarded since 1995
- Grammy Award for Best Rap/Sung Collaboration—awarded since 2002

Collaboration has been a constant feature of electroacoustic music, due to the technology's complexity. Embedding technological tools into the process stimulated the emergence of new agents with new expertise: the musical assistant, the technician, the computer music designer, the music mediator (a profession that has been described and defined in different ways over the years) – aiding with writing, creating new instruments, recording and/or performance. The musical assistant explains developments in musical research and translates artistic ideas into programming languages. Finally, he or she transforms those ideas into a score or a computer program and often performs the musical piece during the concerts. Examples of collaboration include Pierre Boulez and Andrew Gerzso, Alvise Vidolin and Luigi Nono, Jonathan Harvey and Gilbert Nouno.

===== Classical music =====
Although relatively rare compared with collaboration in popular music, there have been some notable examples of music written collaboratively by classical composers. Perhaps the best-known examples are:

- Hexameron, a set of variations for solo piano on a theme from Vincenzo Bellini's opera I puritani. It was written and first performed in 1837. The contributors were Franz Liszt, Frédéric Chopin, Carl Czerny, Sigismond Thalberg, Johann Peter Pixis, and Henri Herz.
- The F-A-E Sonata, a sonata for violin and piano, written in 1853 as a gift for the violinist Joseph Joachim. The composers were Albert Dietrich (first movement), Robert Schumann (second and fourth movements), and Johannes Brahms (third movement).

==== Entertainment ====
Collaboration in entertainment dates from the origin of theatrical productions, millennia ago. It takes the form of writers, directors, actors, producers and other individuals or groups working on the same production. In the twenty-first century, new technology has enhanced collaboration. A system developed by Will Wright for the TV series title Bar Karma on CurrentTV facilitates plot collaboration over the Internet. Screenwriter organizations bring together professional and amateur writers and filmmakers.

=== Business ===
Collaboration in business can be found both within and across organizations, and examples range from formalised partnerships, use of coworking spaces where freelancers can work with others in a collaborative environment and crowd funding, to the complexity of a multinational corporation. Inter-organizational collaboration brings participating parties to invest resources, mutually achieve goals, share information, resources, rewards and responsibilities, as well as make joint decisions and solve problems. Collaboration between public, private and voluntary sectors can be effective in tackling complex policy problems, but may be handled more effectively by boundary-spanning teams and networks than by formal organizational structures. In turn, business and management scholars have paid much attention to the importance of both formal and informal mechanisms to support inter-organizational collaboration. They especially point to the role of contractual and relational mechanisms and the inherent tensions between the two. Global manufacturer Unilever offers to collaborate with innovating start-up businesses, and its "Unilever Foundry" refers to over 400 examples of "strategic collaboration" in this field. Collaborative procurement has been commended as a means of achieving financial savings and operational efficiency in the acquisition of common goods and services in the public sector, and producing mutually beneficial results in the private sector. Collaboration allows for better communication within organizations and along supply chains. It is a way of coordinating different ideas from numerous people to generate a wide variety of knowledge. Collaboration with a few selected firms has been shown to positively impact firm performance and innovation outcomes.

Technology has provided the internet, wireless connectivity and collaboration tools such as blogs and wikis, and has as such created the possibility of "mass collaboration". People are able to rapidly communicate and share ideas, crossing longstanding geographical and cultural boundaries. Social networks permeate business culture where collaborative uses include file sharing and knowledge transfer. According to author Evan Rosen command-and-control organizational structures inhibit collaboration and replacing such structures allows collaboration to flourish. An article by Lee Gomes published in the MIT Technology Review in 2011 quotes Rosen as saying that star-oriented culture, which is prevalent in American society and in organizations, "inhibits the very collaboration that he maintains can make companies more effective".

Studies have found that collaboration can increase achievement and productivity. However, Bill Huber, former chair of the International Association for Contract and Commercial Management (IACCM, now World Commerce & Contracting), notes that not all companies have what he calls "collaborative DNA". Huber argues that

often when companies fail to implement or sustain successful collaborative relationships, the causes can be traced to insufficient leadership support or to underdeveloped collaboration skills.

Andrew Cox, formerly of Birmingham Business School and the founder of the International Institute for Advanced Purchasing and Supply (IIAPS), has highlighted the dangers in thinking that collaborative relationships always produce mutually advantageous "win-win" outcomes for both buyers and sellers in commercial relationships. Cox uses case studies which show where competent buyers have used collaboration successful to secure value for money, and other examples where "incompetent buyers" utilizing "what initially appear to be win-win outcomes" subsequently lose out to "more commercially competent suppliers". In relation to one of his examples, Cox concludes that

From a perception that the buyer was in a win-win situation, it soon became apparent that it was either close to a lose-win or at best a partial win-win situation favouring the supplier.

A four-year study of interorganizational collaboration in a mental health setting found that successful collaboration can be rapidly derailed through external policy steering, particularly where it undermines relations built on trust. Collaboration is also threatened by opportunism from the business partners and the possibility of coordination failures that can derail the efforts of even well-intentioned parties.

Margarita Leib, a professor at Tilburg University in the Netherlands, wrote about how individuals working together sometimes promote dishonest behavior that prioritizes profit, like what Volkswagen did to fake vehicle emission levels. This often begins with one person lying, which incentivizes or pressures everyone else to escalate in response.

=== Education ===
Visualization of the collaborative work in the German textbook project Mathe für Nicht-Freaks

In recent years, co-teaching has become more common, found in US classrooms across all grade levels and content areas. Once regarded as connecting special education and general education teachers, it is now more generally defined as "…two professionals delivering substantive instruction to a diverse group of students in a single physical space."

As American classrooms have become increasingly diverse, so have the challenges for educators. Due to the diverse needs of students with designated special needs, English language learners (ELL), and students of varied academic levels, teachers have developed new approaches that provide additional student support. In practice, students remain in the classroom and receive instruction by both their general teacher and special education teachers.

In the 1996 report "What Matters Most: Teaching for America's Future" economic success could be enhanced if students developed the capacity to learn how to "manage teams… and…work together successfully in teams".

Teachers increasingly use collaborative software to establish virtual learning environments (VLEs). This allows them to share learning materials and feedback with both students and in some cases, parents. Approaches include:

- 21st century skills
- Collaborative partnerships
- Collaborative Partnerships: Business/Industry-Education
- Learning circle

==== Writing ====
Writers, both in fiction and non-fiction, may cooperate on a one-time or long-term basis. It can be as simple as dual-authorship or as complex as commons-based peer production. Tools include Usenet, e-mail lists, blogs and Wikis while 'brick and mortar' examples include monographs (books) and periodicals such as newspapers, journals and magazines. One approach is for an author to publish early drafts/chapters of a work on the Internet and solicit suggestions from the world at large. This approach helped ensure that the technical aspects of the novel The Martian were as accurate as possible.

The science fiction author Frederik Pohl was noted for his longtime collaborations with Cyril Kornbluth and Jack Williamson.

=== Technical communication ===
Collaboration in technical communication (also commonly referred to as technical writing) has become increasingly important in the creation and dissemination of technical documents in multiple technical and occupational fields, including: computer hardware and software, medicine, engineering, robotics, aeronautics, biotechnology, information technology, and finance. Collaboration in technical communication allows for greater flexibility, productivity and innovation for technical writers and the companies they work for, resulting in technical documents that are more comprehensive and accurate than documents produced by individuals. Technical communication collaboration typically occurs on shared document work-spaces (such as Google Docs), through social media sites, videoconferencing, SMS and IM, and on cloud-based authoring platforms.

=== Science ===
Scientific collaboration rapidly advanced throughout the twentieth century as measured by the increasing numbers of coauthors on published papers. Wagner and Leydesdorff found international collaborations to have doubled from 1990 to 2005. While collaborative authorships within nations has also risen, this has done so at a slower rate and is not cited as frequently. Notable examples of scientific collaboration include CERN, the International Space Station, the ITER nuclear fusion experiment, and the European Union's Human Brain Project.

=== Medicine ===
Collaboration in health care is defined as health care professionals assuming complementary roles and cooperatively working together, sharing responsibility for problem-solving and making decisions to formulate and carry out plans for patient care. Collaboration between physicians, nurses, and other health care professionals increases team members' awareness of each other's type of knowledge and skills, leading to continued improvement in decision making. A collaborative plan is filed with each state board of medicine where the PA works. This plan formally delineates the scope of practice approved by the physician.

==== Collaboration between stakeholders in health and social care ====
Welfare services, including healthcare systems, have become more specialised over time and are provided by an increasing number of departments and organisations. One disadvantage from this development is fragmented supply of health and social services, which hampers integration of services resulting in suboptimal care, higher cost due to overlaps and poor quality of care.

The current system, in which care is fragmented and delivered by several different stakeholders, increases the need of all relevant stakeholders to coordinate and collaborate both within and between organisations in order to deliver services tailored to people's needs.

This need of increased collaboration between stakeholders corresponds with the principles of people-centered care.

=== Technology ===
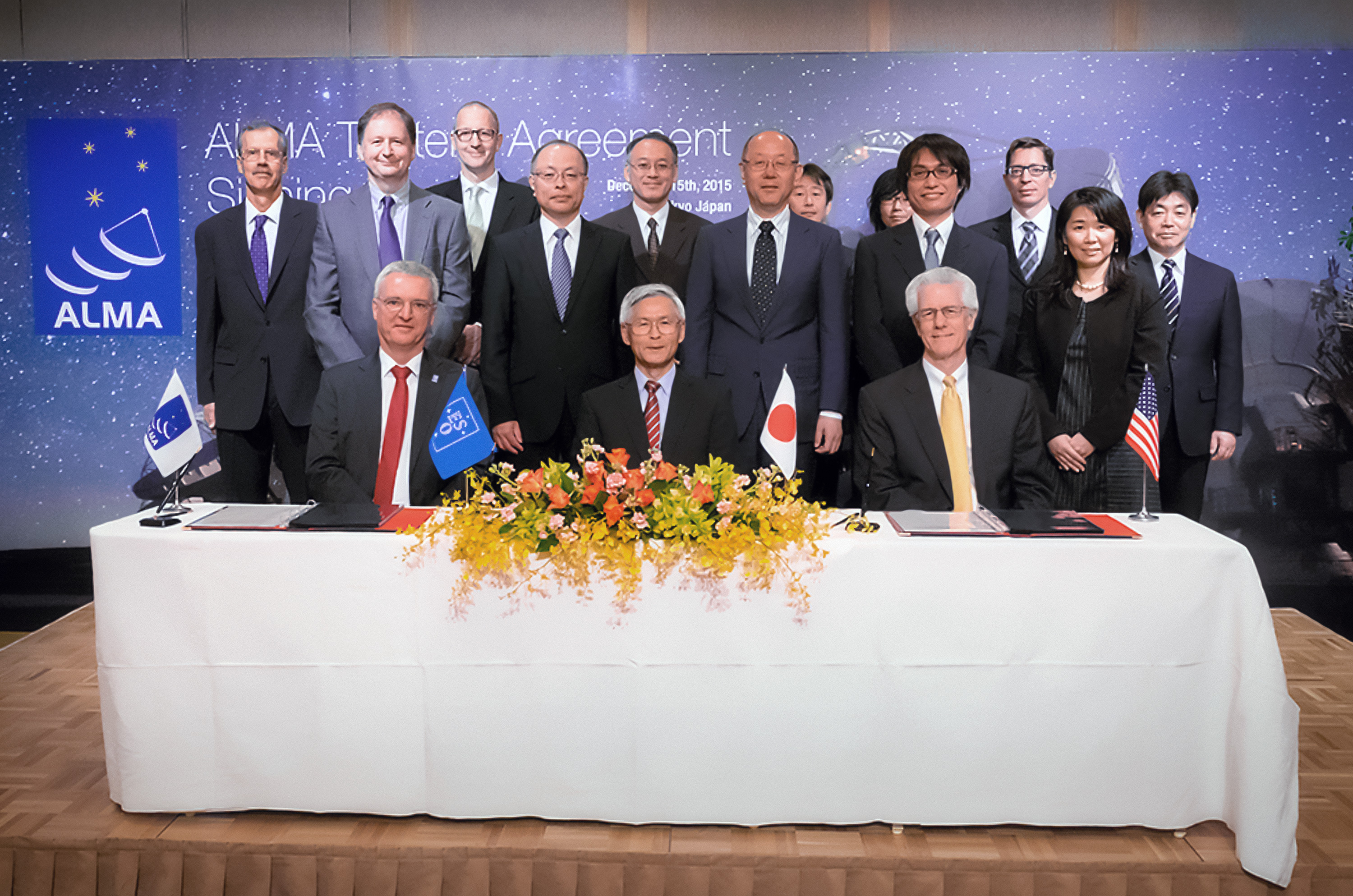
Trilateral agreement between ESO, the National Science Foundation and the National Institutes of Natural Sciences for the operation of ALMA

Collaboration in technology encompasses a broad range of tools that enable groups of people to work together including social networking, instant messaging, team spaces, web sharing, audio conferencing, video, and telephony. Many large companies adopt collaboration platforms to allow employees, customers and partners to intelligently connect and interact.

Enterprise collaboration tools focus on encouraging collective intelligence and staff collaboration at the organization level, or with partners. These include features such as staff networking, expert recommendations, information sharing, expertise location, peer feedback, and real-time collaboration. At the personal level, this enables employees to enhance social awareness and their profiles and interactions Collaboration encompasses both asynchronous and synchronous methods of communication and serves as an umbrella term for a wide variety of software packages. Perhaps the most commonly associated form of synchronous collaboration is web conferencing, but the term can encompass IP telephony, instant messaging, and rich video interaction with telepresence, as well.

The effectiveness of a collaborative effort is driven by three critical factors:

- Communication
- Content management
- Workflow

==== The Internet ====
The Internet's low cost and nearly instantaneous sharing of ideas, knowledge, and skills has made collaborative work dramatically easier. Not only can a group cheaply communicate, but the wide reach of the Internet allows groups to easily form, particularly among dispersed, niche participants. An example of this is the free software movement in software development which produced GNU and Linux from scratch and has taken over development of Mozilla and OpenOffice.org (formerly known as Netscape Communicator and StarOffice).

With the recent development of social media platforms, there has been a constant and quick growth in the use of the Internet for communication and collaboration between people. The 2.0 version of the internet has become a tool for collaborative projects, blogs, online communities, social networks, group games. An example of how social media aids in more effective collaboration is seen via the business environment. Communication and collaboration create new hierarchies and wider networks for employees and partners of organisations. Additionally, it also enables businesses to broaden their marketing strategies by collaborating with influencers of those social media platforms.

==== Commons-based peer production ====
Commons-based peer production is a term coined by Yale Law professor Yochai Benkler to describe a new model of economic production in which the creative energy of large numbers of people is coordinated (usually with the aid of the internet) into large, meaningful projects, mostly without hierarchical organization or financial compensation. He compares this to firm production (where a centralized decision process decides what has to be done and by whom) and market-based production (when tagging different prices to different jobs serves as an attractor to anyone interested in doing the job).

Examples of products created by means of commons-based peer production include Linux, a computer operating system; Slashdot, a news and announcements website; Kuro5hin, a discussion site for technology and culture; Wikipedia, an online encyclopedia; and Clickworkers, a collaborative scientific work. Another example is Socialtext, a software solution that uses tools such as wikis and weblogs and helps companies to create a collaborative work environment.

==== Massively distributed collaboration ====
The term massively distributed collaboration was coined by Mitchell Kapor, in a presentation at UC Berkeley on 2005-11-09, to describe an emerging activity of wikis and electronic mailing lists and blogs and other content-creating virtual communities online.

== In war ==
Wartime collaboration refers to cooperating with the enemy or enemies of one's own country. Examples include:

- Collaboration with Nazi Germany and Fascist Italy
- Collaboration with the Empire of Japan
- Collaboration with the Islamic State
- Collaboration with Russia during the Russo-Ukrainian war (2022–present)

== See also ==
- Clinical collaboration
- Collaborative governance
- Collaborative innovation network
- Collaborative leadership
- Collaborative search engine
- Collaborative translation
- Commons-based peer production
- Compliance (disambiguation)
- Conference call
- Cooperative game theory
- Coworking
- Critical thinking
- Crowdsourcing
- The Culture of Collaboration
- Design thinking
- Digital collaboration
- Facilitation
- Helping behavior
- Intranet portal
- Knowledge management
- Learning circle
- Malicious compliance
- Outsourcing
- Outstaffing
- Postpartisan
- Reciprocal altruism
- Role-based collaboration
- Sociality
- Teamwork
- Telepresence
- Unorganisation
- Wikinomics
- Faz'ah
