= RBC =

RBC may refer to:

== Media and arts ==
- Radio Beijing Corporation, a family of municipal radio stations in Beijing, China
- RBC Ministries, now Our Daily Bread Ministries, a Christian media outlet in Grand Rapids, Michigan
- RBC Radio, the former name of Easy 96, a sub-channel radio station providing Asian Indian programming in New York City
- RBC Records, an American independent record label
- RBC Theatre, in the Living Arts Centre, Mississauga, Ontario, Canada
- RBK Daily, a general business newspaper published in Moscow, Russia.
- RBK Group, a large Russian media group
- RBK TV, a business news channel in Russia
- Regional Broadband Consortium, a UK entity for development of broadband to schools
- Rhodesian Broadcasting Corporation, now the Zimbabwe Broadcasting Corporation
- Ryukyu Broadcasting Corporation, a Japanese television and radio station

== Computing ==
- Radio Block Centre, a computer system of the European Train Control System
- Real business-cycle theory, a class of classical macroeconomics models
- Recognition-by-components theory, a bottom-up process to explain object recognition
- Reflected binary code or Gray code, a binary numeral system where two successive values differ in only one bit
- Role-based collaboration, a computer programming approach in security and service software

== Companies and organizations ==
- RBC Roosendaal, a Dutch football club
- Rare Breeds Canada, dedicated to preserving Canadian livestock
- Royal Bank of Canada
  - RBC Bank, the US division of the Royal Bank of Canada
- Royal British Colonial Society of Artists

== Schools ==
- Reformed Bible College, a former name of Kuyper College in Grand Rapids, Michigan, US
- Richard Bland College, in Virginia, US
- Roanoke Bible College, a previous name of Mid-Atlantic Christian University in Elizabeth City, North Carolina, US

== Other uses ==
- Red blood cell, carries oxygen in the blood
- Robinvale Airport, in Robinvale, Victoria, Australia, by IATA code
- Rotating biological contactor, a biological process for wastewater treatment
- 12^{e} Régiment blindé du Canada, a Canadian Forces armoured regiment in Valcartier, Quebec

== See also ==
- RBC Plaza (disambiguation)
