= Something's Happening =

American radio program

Something's Happening (or SH) is a long-format radio program airing four nights a week on Pacifica Radio-owned KPFK 90.7 FM in Los Angeles, California. Roy Tuckman (aka "Roy of Hollywood") created it in early 1977 and has hosted, produced, and engineered it ever since. Each night has a characteristic theme or subject, and all shows typically broadcast from midnight until 6:00 AM, Pacific Time. Most of the content consists of pre-recorded tapes of lectures, interviews, and rebroadcasts from other audio sources. There is the occasional live guest, usually at the very start or ending of the show. One segment, Radio Alchymy, is specifically produced for Something's Happening.

Something's Happening reflects some of the daytime topics of host station KPFK (especially politics), but is able to explore those subjects in greater depth due to more-relaxed time constraints.

== Typical schedule ==
Since the show begins at midnight, each night is designated in "psychological time": Monday night's show begins very late on Monday and continues until Tuesday morning at 6:00 AM, "Tuesday night" means midnight until Wednesday morning, etc. All specific times given below are approximate.

=== Monday ===
Various guests-on-tape, often environmental or spiritual topics.
Frequent speakers: Guy Finley, Natalie Goldberg, Pema Chodron, Adyashanti.

First Monday of the month:
"Old Radio Night" - Bobb Lynes & Barbara Sunday ("Don't Touch That Dial"), X Minus One, etc.

=== Tuesday ===
Gary Null (generally) -- typically a mix of rebroadcasts of Gary's radio show, followed by live phones with Gary if he's available. The topic is usually health and alternative medicine.

=== Wednesday ===
Topics revolve around politics and current events:

- David Emory, "For the Record" (midnight - 1 AM)
- A recorded talk or interview, most often a segment of Alternative Radio (1 AM - 2 AM)
- Eben Rey, "Radio Alchymy" (2 AM - 3 AM)
- A recorded talk or interview, most often The Bioneers (3 AM - 4 AM)
- Talks, interviews, recorded public appearances relating to politics and current events. (4 AM - 5 AM)
- The Best of The Thom Hartmann Show (5 AM - 6 AM)

=== Thursday ===
Spirituality-related content:

- Alan Watts (midnight - 1 AM)
- Shinzen Young (1 AM - 2 AM)
- Jack Gariss (2 AM - 3:30 AM)
- Jiddu Krishnamurti (3:30 AM – 4:30 AM)
- Caroline Casey (5:00 AM – 6:00 AM)

The first Thursday of the month is "Women's Night". Alan Watts and Caroline Casey normally remain, all other slots are replaced with female guests-on-tape. Past Women's Night speakers have included Pema Chodron, Judith Handelsman, and Caroline Myss.

== Annual features ==
Something's Happening has a tradition of annual featured programming. "Beethoven: His Spiritual Development", produced by Roy Tuckman in the late 1970s, is a reading of the book of the same name, interspersed by portions of Beethoven pieces as referenced in the text. It airs on or around Beethoven's birthday in mid-December.

The Homelessness Marathon is a 14-hour radio broadcast featuring the voices and stories of homeless people from around the U.S." SH rebroadcasts portions of it, normally taking up one entire night of programming in February each year.

L. Fletcher Prouty, "Understanding Special Operations and Their Effect on the Vietnam War Era". This is a long interview, featuring Prouty's re-telling of his experiences as a US government official during the Vietnam era. SH plays this multi-part series every few years, sometimes annually.

== Programming sources ==
Something's Happening pulls audio material from many sources, including: Sounds True, TUC Radio, KPFA, WBAI, MEA, Justice Vision, Vipassana Support International, KFA, Spitfire, Alternative Radio, Dharma Seed Tape Library, Bio-Meditation Society, Pacifica Radio Archives, Life of Learning, and Radio Free Maine.
