= Mirvis =

Mirvis (and variants including Mervis, Mirvish, and Mirviss) is a surname of Jewish origin. The name may refer to:

== People ==
- Matt Mervis (born 1998), American baseball player
- Ephraim Mirvis (born 1956), Orthodox rabbi and Chief Rabbi of the United Hebrew Congregations of the Commonwealth
- Philip H. Mirvis (born 1951), organizational psychologist and writer
- Shira Marili Mirvis (born 1980), Israeli religious public figure and teacher
- Tova Mirvis (born 1972), American novelist
- Dan Mirvish, American filmmaker and author
- David Mirvish (born 1945), Canadian art collector and theatre producer; son of Ed Mirvish
- Ed Mirvish (1914–2007), Canadian businessman, philanthropist, and theatrical impresario

== Places ==
- Mervis Hall, an academic building at the University of Pittsburgh, in Pennsylvania, United States
- David Mirvish Gallery, an art gallery run by David Mirvish in Toronto from 1963 to 1978
- Ed Mirvish Theatre in Toronto (previous names include the Pantages Theatre, the Imperial Theatre, and the Canon Theatre)
- Ed & Anne Mirvish Parkette, a public park in Toronto, named for Ed Mirvish
- Mirvish Village, a commercial district in Toronto, named for Ed Mirvish

== Other uses ==
- Mirvish Productions, Canada-based theatrical production company founded by David Mirvish
- Mervis Pantry, a fictional character on the animated television series CatDog
