= Myelin Repair Foundation =

American medical research institute

- Formation: 2002
- Type: not-for-profit
- Headquarters: Saratoga, California
- President, CEO and Founder: Scott Johnson
- Website: http://www.myelinrepair.org

The Myelin Repair Foundation (MRF) is a 501(c)(3) not-for-profit organization based in Saratoga, California. The organization applies a collaborative business model to the process of medical research with the aim of accelerating the identification and development of new patient treatments. MRF's goal is to license its first drug target for commercial drug development by July 1, 2009, five years after the organization began funding research.

The MRF was created by entrepreneur Scott Johnson in 2002, and began funding research in 2004.

On June 22, 2015, the Foundation announced that due to a lack of financing, it would begin the process of winding down. However, additional donors stepped in to provide funding for the Foundation to continue its work with a smaller staff.

== Background ==
The Myelin Repair Foundation was founded in 2002 by Scott Johnson, a California entrepreneur. Johnson had been diagnosed with multiple sclerosis at the age of 20. When given his prognosis, he was told that an effective therapy would probably not be on the market for another 30 to 50 years. “If someone is diagnosed now…they’d probably hear the same thing,” Johnson says. “And that’s pretty frustrating.”

== The ARC Model ==
The MRF conducts research according to the Accelerated Research Collaboration (ARC) model, which also guides the organization's goals and objectives. Under the ARC model, MRF-funded researchers in different labs design and carry out experiments together and share results in real time, thus accelerating the rate at which medical discoveries are made. The results, called “potential drug or therapeutic targets,” are then validated, patented and licensed to a pharmaceutical partner who will take them through the clinical trials process and into a new treatment.

The MRF actively manages the drug discovery process from its origins in basic research through to the clinical trials process where new treatments are produced.

== Advisory boards ==
MRF receives scientific and industry guidance from a board of directors, a scientific advisory board, a business advisory committee, and a Drug Discovery Advisory Group. Members of these advisory and governing boards include Andy Cates of the Value Acquisition Fund; Dr. Stephen Hauser of the University of California at San Francisco; Dr. Christopher Lipinski; and Dr. Mark Scheidler of the National Institutes of Health–National Institute of Neurological Disorders and Stroke.

== Funding ==
The MRF is funded by individuals, foundations, and corporations: including the Robert Wood Johnson Foundation; the Donaghue Foundation; the Thomas H. Maren Foundation; the Penates Foundation; the Pioneer Fund; William K. Bowes, Founder, U.S. Venture Partners; Scott Cook, founder and chairman of the executive committee of Intuit Corporation; the Omidyar Network; Biogen Idec; and the Wayne and Gladys Valley Foundation.

== In the news ==
The MRF has been profiled several times in the national media, including features in The Wall Street Journal, The San Francisco Chronicle, The New Yorker, and BusinessWeek. It has also been used as an example in books such as The Definitive Drucker, by Elizabeth Haas Edersheim; The Culture of Collaboration, by Evan Rosen, and We Are the New Radicals, by Julia Moulden.

== See also ==
- Multiple sclerosis
- Translational research
- Drug discovery
