= WCBN-FM =

Radio station at the University of Michigan

- Ann Arbor, Michigan; United States
- Broadcast area
- Frequency: 88.3 MHz
- Branding: WCBN FM

Programming
- Format: Freeform

Ownership
- Owner: University of Michigan

History
- First air date: 1952 (carrier current on AM); January 23, 1972 (on FM)
- Call sign meaning: Campus Broadcasting Network

Technical information
- Facility ID: 66316
- Class: A
- Power: 1,400 watts
- HAAT: 54 meters
- Transmitter coordinates: 42°16′37″N 83°44′7″W

Links
- Website: wcbn.org

WCBN-FM (88.3 FM) is the student-run radio station of the University of Michigan. Its format is primarily freeform.

== History ==
WCBN is one of the longest-standing continuous practitioners of primarily free-form radio programming. "Freeform" radio format is best described as an approach that allows the individual radio programmer (or DJ) maximum, if not complete, latitude, in determining what is broadcast from moment to moment. In practical terms this may mean that a listener may hear a number of different kinds of music in the course of a single program, often chosen spontaneously during that same program; but a listener might just as easily hear live broadcasts from a field with sounds of crickets, a radio play, poetry, or spontaneous political protest. On November 5, 1980, the day after Ronald Reagan won the 1980 presidential election, WCBN played Lesley Gore's "It's My Party (and I'll Cry if I Want To)" continuously for 18 hours.

WCBN was created in 1952 when three existing carrier current broadcasting systems on campus pooled resources. WCBN-AM college radio could be tuned to in University buildings at 640 kHz. Programming was coordinated between the existing broadcast facilities.

In 1956, WCBN hosted the first meeting of the National Association of College Broadcasters.

Until 1958, South, East and West Quad had separate transmitters, each on a different frequency, as well as one on the Hill, with a loop connecting the three studios. In 1958, John Maurer built a limiter and switching device so that sound was constant and could be switched by any studio to feed all transmitters and was wired by Cliff Vander Yacht. Dave Mills had constructed the Hill transmitter the year before and tested it at National Music Camp during the summer. Some years before, the Federal Communications Commission FCC had allocated the call sign even though the carrier current transmitters were not licensed. (CVY)

In 1965, the WCBN operations were consolidated in the newly completed Student Activities Building.

In early 1971, the U-M Board of Regents approved a proposal to seek a full license for WCBN on the FM band. On January 23, 1972, WCBN-FM went on the air at 89.5 MHz with a 10-watt transmitter. At this time, the carrier current station adopted the new callsign WRCN, and programming was divided.

In October 1977, neighboring station WEMU at Eastern Michigan University in Ypsilanti, Michigan upgraded its studios and changed its FCC broadcast frequency from 88.1 MHz to 89.1 MHz. With WCBN broadcasting at 89.5 MHz, there was a danger of station overlap. Accordingly, WCBN received a stipend from Eastern Michigan University to change its operating frequency to 88.3 MHz, where it remains today.

Beginning in 1980, the station began holding regular annual on-air fundraisers to supplement its University support. The first fundraiser was organized by then-General Manager Ann Rebentisch and lasted for 88.3 hours, with a goal of raising $8,830, nearly doubling the station's funding. The event culminated on Valentine's Day with a free concert of local bands for all who had pledged to donate.

WCBN's transmitter was upgraded to 200 watts in 1987, an FCC action that was delayed for several years after some disgruntled former station volunteers filed an extensive complaint letter which turned out to contain mostly erroneous information. The power increase had been deemed necessary after the FCC began threatening to reassign frequency positions of 10-watt Class D (Educational) stations like WCBN.

In addition to on-air studio productions, WCBN also has a rich history of local concert sponsorship, recently hosting performances by Jad Fair, Sunburned Hand of the Man, Mount Eerie, The Books, and Jandek. They sponsored an outdoor concert featuring bouncy houses called "Bouncevember" with bands Luna Pier, Atomic Sauce, and Joe and the Ruckus.

Currently, WCBN is in the process of installing a new 3,000-watt transmitter. It is expected to be operational at the end of December 2017, at which time the station will switch over to the new transmitter and antenna and utilize an extended broadcast range. Nearly all of the money used to pay for the upgrade came from fundraiser donations raised over the previous years.

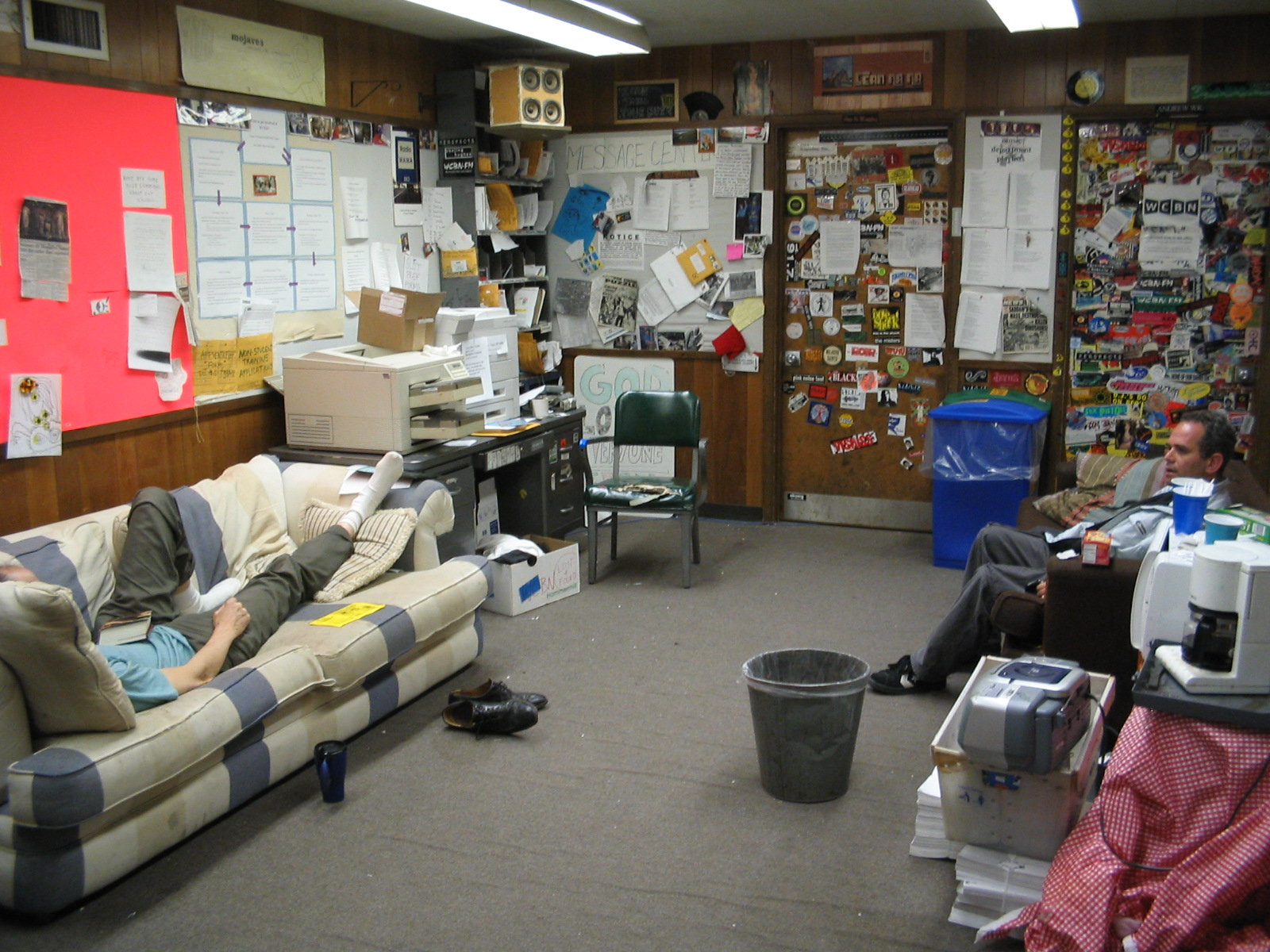
Lobby of WCBN

WCBN's programming format is one primarily of freeform music. There are also many specialty programs focusing on specific styles or origins of music. Long-running shows include Dance Hall Reggae, Nothin' But the Blues, the country program Down Home Show, the bluegrass show Bill Monroe for Breakfast, the techno show Crush Collision, the jazz show Face the Music, the Thursday morning program featuring "AM on the FM" with weather and news alongside classical music, Short Stack, and the hip hop show The Prop Shop. Several of these programs have aired continuously for over 20 years. Sunday programming consists mainly of specialty shows featuring the music of Africa, Asia, India, Israel and the Middle East, Japan, Turkey and the Mediterranean including the Indian music show Sounds of the Subcontinent and Latin music show The Latin Hour. The weekly, 2-hour Local Music Show features local artists performing live in-studio. The weekly show Girl Power is an hour of music by female artists and vocalists. The show The Seizure Experiment features hardcore punk and metal.

In addition to musical specialty shows, WCBN features programming for the public good, including weekly talk shows It's Hot In Here, which covers environmental news, Living Writers, Grey Matters, Civics Party, and Interactive Technologies. Freeform radio show Baby Blue featured an interview with Pulitzer-Prize winning author Michael Chabon.

WCBN also features a sports department. WCBN Sports covers all Michigan athletics, local and national professional teams, and national and international sporting events. WCBN broadcasts Michigan football, basketball, hockey, baseball, softball, volleyball, soccer, field hockey, and lacrosse. The sports department runs a daily sports report at 6pm Monday through Thursday and regularly broadcasts Michigan sporting events on their YouTube channel. WCBN Sports has also helped produce podcasts hosted by student-athletes on the basketball team.

== Other information ==
- In addition to its FM broadcast, WCBN can be heard via the Internet at wcbn.org.
- WCBN Sports runs a YouTube channel, through which it broadcasts live athletics events.
- The University of Michigan also operates the NPR station WUOM-FM, which is run as a service to the community and does not directly involve students in its operation.
- Ken Freedman, general manager of the longest continuously-operating freeform radio station, WFMU-FM, worked at WCBN from 1977 to 1983 and was the DJ who marked the election of Ronald Reagan by playing Lesley Gore's "It's My Party (And I'll Cry If I Want To) continuously for 18 hours.
- Author Mary Gaitskill DJ'd at WCBN while attending the University of Michigan.
- John Sinclair (poet) hosted a Jazz program named "Re:Visions" in the late 1970s.
- Gilda Radner was weather girl at WCBN from 1965 to 1966.
- In the past, WCBN has broadcast locally and nationally produced news and issues programming, such as nationally-produced FAIR's CounterSpin, and Free Speech Radio News (who has since stopped broadcasting full news segments), as well as Dave Emory's commentary show For the Record. The locally-produced LGBT issues program Closets R4 Clothes had aired since 1975.
- The WCBN News Department was revitalized beginning in 2004, when a group of students converged to conduct live coverage of the presidential elections. Out of this grew a more long-term project called BlackBox Radio, which produced over 50 episodes of its weekly show. BlackBox radio stopped production in 2006.
- WCBN's alumni include Ted Oberg (reporter for KTRK-TV, Houston, Texas), Fanchon Stinger (former morning anchorwoman at WJBK-TV), Beth Fertig (education reporter for WNYC, New York), Kevin West (program & news director for WGOW-AM-FM in Chattanooga, Tennessee), Jesse Walker (author of the radio history Rebels on the Air), Pat Batcheller (host/senior news editor for WDET in Detroit), and Evan Rosen, author of The Culture of Collaboration.

== See also ==
- Campus radio
- List of college radio stations in the United States
