= Roy Tuckman =

American radio personality (1938–2023)

- Born: Roy Tuckman; June 23, 1938; Los Angeles, California, U.S.
- Died: April 20, 2023 (aged 84)
- Other names: Roy of Hollywood
- Education: Master's degree in Social anthropology (1967)
- Alma mater: UCLA
- Occupation: Radio personality
- Years active: 1977–2023
- Known for: Something's Happening
- Website: Something's Happening (Official Site)

Roy Tuckman (June 23, 1938 – April 20, 2023), better known as Roy of Hollywood, was an American radio host.

== Early life and education ==
Tuckman was born in Los Angeles in 1938, and earned a master's degree in social anthropology from UCLA in 1967. He joined KPFK in 1972.

== Career ==
Tuckman produced, engineered and hosted the "Something's Happening" show on Pacifica Radio station KPFK-FM in Los Angeles from 1977 until his death in 2023.

Something's Happening ran from 12 midnight to 6:00 a.m., Monday night/Tuesday mornings through Thursday night/Friday mornings.

Monday was "environment/anything goes" night, often featuring computer scientist and Ufologist Eben Rey, and often the Buddhist nun and teacher of Buddhist practices, Pema Chodron, Tuesday was "health/alternative medicine" night, mainly featuring Gary Null. Wednesday was politics night, featuring anti-fascist researcher Dave Emory. Thursday was "spirituality/mysticism" night, often featuring Alan Watts, Jack Gariss, Colin Wilson, and J. Krishnamurti.

== Honors and awards ==
Tuckman's awards included a Major Armstrong Award for the documentary "Upton Sinclair: The Reverent Radical", and an AP Best Spot News Coverage award (shared with Elliot Mintz) for his live, on-air interview with Iranian hostage-takers inside the American embassy in Tehran in November 1979.

== Death ==
Tuckman died on April 20, 2023, at the age of 84.
