= Collaborative partnership =

Agreements by organizations to share resources

Collaborative partnerships are agreements and actions made by consenting organizations to share resources to accomplish a mutual goal. Collaborative partnerships rely on participation by at least two parties who agree to share resources, such as finances, knowledge, and people. Organizations in a collaborative partnership share common goals. The essence of collaborative partnership is for all parties to mutually benefit from working together.

There are instances where collaborative partnerships develop between those in different fields to supplement one another's expertise. The relationships between collaborative partners can lead to long-term partnerships that rely on one another.

As Don Kettl writes, “From Medicare to Medicaid, environmental planning to transportation policy, the federal government shares responsibility with state and local government and for-profit and nonprofit organizations... The result is an extended chain of implementation in which no one is fully in charge of everything”(2001, p. 25)

Partnership and collaboration are often used inter-changeably, sometimes within the same paragraph or even sentence. Much use of the terminology is policy driven, giving way to the use of terms such as ‘joined-up thinking’ and ‘joined-up working’; for example, Every Child Matters (DfES 2004: 9) states that progress in improving educational achievement for children and young people in care and in improving their health has been possible through better joint working.

Collaborative arrangements occur based on more than just altruism. Mutuality and equitable engagement will not exist if southern partners expect developed countries to simply transfer their technological competitive advantage(Brinkerhoff 2002). A particular concern that arises in both for-profit and academic partnerships has been the failure to reap benefits of collaboration at meso- and macro-levels. While Southern researchers, inventors and managers involved in cross-border collaboration projects have benefited individually, these benefits do not translate to improvements in their organizations and institutions, possibly reflecting a problem of agency in the relationship (Alnuaimiet al. 2012). In general, partnerships for sustainable development are self-organizing and coordinating alliances. In a more strict definition; they are collaborative arrangements in which actors from two or more spheres of society- whether state, market, and civil society, are involved in a non-hierarchical process through which these actors strive for a sustainability goal (Glasbergen et al. 2007). In recent times, partnerships are set up to solve societal problems and they do so on the basis of a commitment that is formalized to some extent.

== Sustainable development ==
Partnerships are perceived as arrangements that can further the drive for sustainable development. In that role, they provide a managerial response to the general ethical ideal of societal progress. Collaborative arrangements in which actors from two or more spheres of society (state, market and civil society) are involved in a non-hierarchical process through which these actors strive for a sustainability goal. Partnership practices may be seen as both idealistic and structural specifications of that philosophy in a more operational governance paradigm. The main premises can be summarize underpinning this partnership paradigm as follows:

- Parties from the public sector, from the market and from civil society have an interest in sustainable development.
- A constructive dialogue among these interests can be convened in a setting that excludes hierarchy and authority.
- Dialogue can produce a shared normative belief that provides a value-based rationale for collaborative action.
- Collaborative action based on voluntarism, joint resource commitment and shared responsibility of all actors for the whole project can serve public interests as well as private interests.
- Collective action can be commercial in nature; the market mechanism can promote more sustainable practices through the leverage and spin-off of private-sector investments.

A pluriform partnership practice has taken root in a paradigmatic premises. Partnerships come in three modalities.

- The modality concerns partnerships that are initiated by government. These partnerships lean heavily on the authority and sanctions of government.
- The second modality concerns arrangements made by private parties in which public administrations participate as one of many partners.
- The third modality concerns the cooperation between businesses and non-governmental organizations. These collaborative arrangements also relate to society's problem-solving capacity.

Sustainable development requires concerted collaborative actions at all levels from macro to micro and across all sectors. Cross-sector social partnerships are proliferating rapidly (Child and Faulkner, 1998; Berger, Cunningham and Drumright, 2000). Organizations are more learning to form a multitude of collaborative relationships, including strategic alliances (Bamford, Gomes-Casseres, & Robinson, 2002), partnerships, joint ventures (Child, Faulkner, & Tallman, 2005; Marks & Mirvis, 2011), and trans-organization networks (Clarke, 2005; Cummings, 1984). When organizations work together, they are able to develop and fulfill much broader visions by tapping into each other's resources and expertise (Cooperrider & Dutton, 1999; Huxham & Vangen, 2005). This is also a world filled with frustration. In spite of good intentions and dedicated resources, collaborations do not come easy or naturally (Cummings, 1984); they are messy and difficult (Gray, 1989; Huxham & Vangen, 2005). Collaborations focused on sustainability issues, for example, are highly visible and wicked problems that draw the attention of large and powerful interests, including governments, large corporations, and well-funded nongovernmental organizations (NGOs). They often produce considerably less benefit than intended (Nordhaus, 2001; Worley & Parker, 2011).

One way partnership benefits can be optimized is through participatory approaches to partnership. By allowing the stereotypically marginalized groups/people/partners to be given a voice in both naming local issues and having control over decisions that affect them, more equal and sustainable partnerships can be made. In order to ensure effective partnership, it is imperative to focus on empowering community members, promoting co-decision making, and safeguarding against one group dominating the conversations and decision-making (and therefore dominating the "partnership"). In this way, equal and truly collaborative partnerships can be promoted.

=== Natural resource management ===
- Environmental partnerships: Voluntary, jointly defined activities and decision-making processes among corporate, non-profit, and agency organisations that aim to improve environmental quality or natural resource utilisation. (Long and Arnold, 1995)
- New social partnerships: People and organisations from some combination of public, business and civic constituencies who engage in voluntary, mutually beneficial, innovative relationships to address common societal aims through combining their resources and competencies. (Nelson and Zadek, 2001)
- Collaboration: The pooling of appreciation and/ or tangible resources ( e.g., information, money, labour) by two or more stakeholders to solve a set of problems neither can solve individually. (Gray, 1989)
- Networking: A number of autonomous... groups link up to share knowledge, practice solidarity or act jointly and/ or simultaneously in different spaces. Based on moral (as distinct from professional or institutional) motivations, networks are cooperative, not competitive. Communication is of their essence... Their raison d‘être is not in themselves, but in a job to be done... They foster solidarity and a sense of belonging. They expand the sphere of autonomy and freedom. The source of the movement is the same everywhere— people's autonomous power— and so is their most universal goal, survival. (Nerfin, 1986)
- Co-management: True co-management goes far beyond mere consultation. With co-management, the involvement of indigenous peoples in protected areas becomes a formal partnership, with conservation management authority shared between indigenous peoples and government agencies... or national and international non-governmental organisations. [...] true co-management requires involvement in policy-formulation, planning, management and evaluation. (Stevens, 1997)
- Collaborative management (of protected an areas) A situation in which some or all of the relevant stakeholders are involved in a substantial way in management activities. Specifically, in a collaborative management process the agency with jurisdiction over natural resources develops a partnership with other relevant stakeholders (primarily including local residents and resource users) which specifies and guarantees the respective management functions, rights and responsibilities. (Borrini-Feyerabend, 1996)

=== Stakeholders ===
The most intractable yet critical challenge in the pursuit of collaboration in natural resource management is to engage the most powerful stakeholders in analysis of the causes and alternatives to conflict. Although in many settings marginalized groups must be empowered to undertake problem analysis and formulate strategies for negotiation, change will only come about if the powerful are moved to act on the causes of marginalization, inequity, and mismanagement (Thomaset al. 1996).

Marginal stakeholders can be an incredible asset for collaborative networks. Networks and partnerships can be prime vehicles for incorporating multiple stakeholders, directly or indirectly, in a cooperative venture's goals, decisions, and results. Network development, partnership, and collaboration have been proposed to enable organizations to understand and respond to complex problems in new ways (Cummings, 1984; Gray, 1985). Marginal stakeholders need to understand the importance of a shared decision-making process to formalize the relationships in the network. In that sense, marginal stakeholders can be their own worst enemy. Second, marginal stakeholders need external support. By virtue of their size and capacity, many marginal stakeholders have less slack resources to devote to interorganizational collaboration. Marginal stakeholders need coaching and development to be effective members of a referent organization.

=== Challenges and barriers of collaborative partnership ===
Unreliable funding can create significant obstacles to collaborative working relationships between stakeholders. Khan and colleagues (2004) report that in Africa, the provision of adequate financial and technical resources are key to any sustainable co-management. In addition, in Africa, family worries, poor internet infrastructure and the high cost of international calls limit collaborative partnerships. In the Caribbean, CANARI (1999) states that the implementation of participatory decisions and management actions requires not only political support but also adequate technical and financial resources.

Tensions may occur when organizations of different sizes and/or from different sectors collaborate. This can be due to differences in expectations, differences in available resources, or differences between objectives and motives (for example when the collaborators place different emphasis on financial and societal outcomes) (Gillett et al., 2016) .

Tensions can also exist as a result of the one-way nature of a resource flow, where the organization providing more resources typically has more power and agency in the relationship. This results in an inherent power dynamic among collaborative partnerships, bringing up the question of whether partnerships can truly overcome unequal power relations at all.

Themes surrounding inclusivity can also be a major challenge to partnership. By accidentally or even purposefully excluding marginalized groups from decision-making conversations, partnerships can miss out on the opportunity to more creatively define and tackle local issues.

== Industry ==
=== Business ===
Collaborative partnerships in business benefit from the close, trusting relationships between partners. Network strength and openness create profit amongst businesses that have created trust between them. Collaborative partnerships between businesses generate higher levels of productivity and revenue when there is stable, bidirectional communication between parties. These partnerships develop into longstanding practices and relationships that can extend beyond the length of a single project.

== Education ==
=== Educational collaborative partnerships ===
Educational collaborative partnerships is ongoing involvement between schools and business/industry, unions, governments and community organizations. Educational collaborative partnerships are established by mutual agreement between two or more parties to work together on projects and activities that will enhance the quality of education for students while improving skills critical to success in the workplace.

=== Education and business collaborative partnerships ===
The collaborative partnerships between education and businesses form to benefit innovation and educational goals. Businesses benefit from unique academic solutions to real world problems. Institutions of various learning levels benefit from funding, industry support, and resources that would normally take away from academic problems.

== Healthcare ==
The collaborative partnerships are an effective approach to addressing emerging healthcare issues. Having clearly defined collaboration and partnerships helps establish a partnership which will allow its participants to meet their goals. As an example, the University of Massachusetts Boston College of Nursing and Health Sciences, and the Dana Farber Harvard Cancer Center Nursing Services identified a shortage of minority nurses and a failure of sufficient numbers of minority nurses to graduate from doctoral programs that threatened the viability of nursing education programs. With the shared goal of quality patient care a collaborative partnership was formed, a grant proposal was written, and a research program was established. The success of this program will be dependent on the ability and commitment of the university and DFHCC to provide “the time, energy, persistence, and flexibility” required for maintaining it.

The reference to business partnerships is interesting given the recent trends in health and social care. Use of the term ‘partnership’ in health and social care settings is strongly influenced by policy, and policy changes quickly. Thus, because terms like ‘partnership’ are closely allied to policy they can change across time and place as the context changes.

== Government ==
According to the U.S. Government Accountability Office:

The GPRA Modernization Act of 2010 (GPRAMA) establishes a new framework aimed at taking a more cross-cutting and integrated approach to focusing on results and improving government performance.

Agencies can enhance and sustain their collaborative efforts by engaging in the eight practices identified below. Running throughout these practices are a number of factors such as leadership, trust, and organizational culture that are necessary elements for a collaborative working relationship.

- Collaboration practices
- Define and articulate a common outcome.
- Establish mutually reinforcing or joint strategies.
- Identify and address needs by leveraging resources.
- Agree on roles and responsibilities.
- Establish compatible policies, procedures, and other means to operate across agency boundaries.
- Develop mechanisms to monitor, evaluate, and report on results.
- Reinforce agency accountability for collaborative efforts through agency plans and reports.
- Reinforce individual accountability for collaborative efforts through performance management systems.

'Place-based' partnerships have been used by many governments around the world to tackle complex social problems. For example, in Australia, the Victorian Government has emphasised ‘joined up’ government and partnerships between government and community as a means of better responding to the complex issues faced by local and regional communities.

== See also ==
- Business-education partnerships
- Collaboration
- Cooperative learning
- Good governance
- Indigenous and community conserved area
- Natural resource management
- Partnership
- Public–private partnership
