= Elliot Mintz =

American consultant (born 1945)

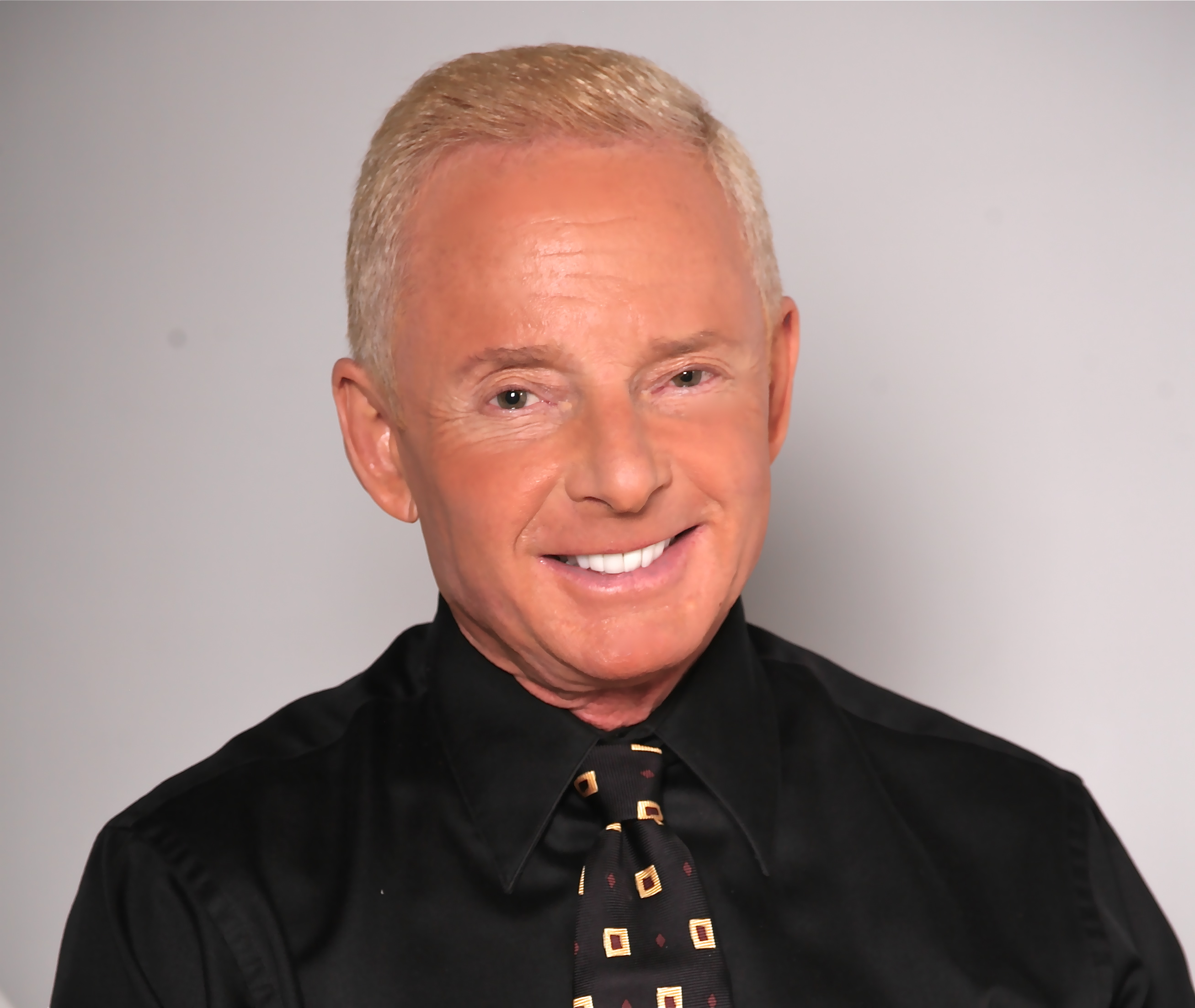
- Mintz, c. 2013
- Born: February 16, 1945 (age 81); The Bronx, New York, U.S.
- Education: Los Angeles City College
- Occupations: Radio personality, television personality, media consultant
- Years active: 1963–present
- Known for: Association with John Lennon, Yoko Ono, and Paris Hilton
- Website: elliotmintz.com

Elliot Mintz (born February 16, 1945) is an American radio and television personality, as well as media consultant. Mintz began his career as a radio DJ in the 1960s, before becoming a radio and television personality. He hosted shows on KPFK, Earth News Radio, and Innerview, and was also an entertainment correspondent for ABC 7 in Los Angeles.

In the 1970s, Mintz became a publicist for John Lennon and Yoko Ono, later adding other musicians and actors as clients, including Bob Dylan, Paris Hilton and Canadian drummer Neil Peart from Rush. Mintz also presented The Lost Lennon Tapes, a music documentary series that ran between 1988 and 1992.

== Early life ==
Mintz was born to a Jewish family in the Bronx borough of New York City on February 16, 1945.

In 1963 – partly inspired by the film The Misfits – he moved to California to attend Los Angeles City College, where he studied broadcasting and began to do radio interviews. Early interviews by Mintz included Jayne Mansfield and Jack Lemmon. His first interview to be broadcast nationally came after the death of John F. Kennedy, when he discovered a classmate of his, Roland Bynum, had known Lee Harvey Oswald while in the US Marines together. The interview was the first character and background interview done about Oswald in the U.S., and was picked up by the national and international radio broadcast networks. He then became a radio D.J. in the 1960s.

== Radio and television career ==
From 1966 to 1968, Elliot Mintz had two shows on Pacifica Radio station KPFK-FM in Los Angeles, called Looking In and Looking Out. The shows provided a platform for community conversation, as well as for interviews Mintz did with public figures. Each show would begin with a series of rhetorical questions, which listeners could call in to respond to on the air. When he started with KPFK, at the age of 21, Mintz was the youngest talk show host in the U.S., broadcasting a nightly radio show on the station.

In 1971 Mintz hosted a Kaiser Broadcasting syndicated television show called Headshop that integrated musical guests with film clips shot in and around Southern California. From 1973 to 1974, Mintz was the entertainment correspondent for Eyewitness News on KABC television in Los Angeles. He also worked on-air at KLAC (1968–69), KMET (1969), and KLOS (1970–71). During this part of his career he interviewed Hollywood actors and recording artists, and lived next door to Timothy Leary.

Mintz's interviews include those with Mort Sahl, Norman Mailer, Ray Bradbury, Alan Watts, Salvador Dalí, Jack Lemmon, John Wayne, Groucho Marx, Timothy Leary, Jack Nicholson, Allen Ginsberg, Jayne Mansfield, Raquel Welch, Karen Black, and musicians like John Lennon, Donna Summer, John Coltrane, Stevie Wonder, Ringo Starr, Alice Cooper, Kris Kristofferson, and Mick Jagger.

Mintz retired in 2014, upon which he released a website containing his past interviews for download. Other radio stations he worked for include KPPC, KABC, Earth News Radio, Innerview, and Westwood One.

He appeared on episodes of The Real Housewives of Beverly Hills in 2016 and 2021.

=== Iran hostage crisis ===
In 1980 Mintz, along with KPFK's overnight host Roy Tuckman, received a California Associated Press, Television and Radio Association award for their November 30, 1979 radio interview of Iranian students who were occupying the American Embassy in Tehran at the start of the Iran hostage crisis.

== Public relations career ==
Mintz is a public relations person and spokesperson for individuals and corporate clients. His first client was Bobby Sherman during the 1960s. He also represented John Lennon and Yoko Ono, whom he befriended in 1971. He joined their entourage throughout the 1970s and remains a spokesperson for both the John Lennon Estate and Ono. Other clients of Mintz's have included Christie Brinkley, Crosby, Stills and Nash, Diana Ross, Don Johnson, Janet Jones, Melanie Griffith, and Bob Dylan. During the 2000s Mintz represented Paris Hilton, and appeared on her television show The Simple Life.

=== John Lennon and Yoko Ono ===
Since the death of Lennon, Mintz has acted as a spokesperson for the Lennon estate. While sifting through Lennon's belongings, he discovered hundreds of unreleased tape recordings including half-finished new songs and early versions of famous hits. Beginning in 1988, he hosted a weekly syndicated radio series based upon these recordings called The Lost Lennon Tapes, which was broadcast for about four years. After the show came to an end, Mintz began hosting the spinoff radio program The Beatle Years. Mintz has appeared in feature documentaries about Lennon and Yoko Ono, including Imagine: John Lennon, The U.S. vs. John Lennon and The Real Yoko Ono. In 1985, he was a technical advisor on the television film John and Yoko: A Love Story. He also authored an essay about his relationship with them published in a 2005 book entitled Memories of John Lennon. In October 2024 Mintz published a memoir We all shine on: John, Yoko and me.
