= Beth Fertig =

American journalist

Beth Fertig is a New York City-based editor and writer who was previously an award-winning veteran journalist at the New York City public radio station WNYC, and was a regular contributor to NPR's news programs. She covered many beats while at WNYC. These included local politics during Rudy Giuliani's administration, the 9/11 attacks, education, transportation and immigration. In 2005, NPR sent her on a monthlong assignment to KRVS cover the impact of Hurricane Katrina in Lafayette, LA, which received tens of thousands of evacuees from New Orleans. She is also the author of the education book "Why cant u teach me 2 read? Three Students and a Mayor Put Our Schools to the Test".

Fertig left WNYC in 2021 to work as an editor at the XQ Institute, a nonprofit foundation dedicated to improving U.S. high schools. She is now executive director of Press Pass NYC, a nonprofit that helps New York City public schools launch and sustain student news publications.

== Education ==
Fertig is a graduate of the University of Michigan where she worked at both the student newspaper, The Michigan Daily, and the student radio station, WCBN-FM. She earned a master's degree in Social Sciences from the University of Chicago.

== Journalism career ==
After covering New York City education extensively, Fertig started covering immigration law in late 2016 after the election of President Donald Trump. She exposed a Bronx non-profit leader's immigration scam, which relied on a phony ID he said could protect immigrants from deportation. He later lost his non-profit, his accreditation by the U.S. Department of Justice and was subsequently fined by the city. She then covered the impact of the COVID-19 pandemic on different New York City communities and businesses before leaving WNYC in October, 2021.

Fertig was the first WNYC reporter to ever receive the Alfred I. duPont–Columbia University Award. She won for a 2001 series,"The Edison Schools Vote," about the city's failed attempt to privatize several poorly performing public schools. She won many other awards while at WNYC from the city's Deadline Club, the Society of Professional Journalists, RTNDA, PMJA (formerly PRNDI), the Gracie Awards, the Headliner Awards, and the New York Press Club—which gave her a special award after the 2001 terrorist attacks, for a profile of two World Trade Center survivors.

Fertig's coverage of the World Trade Center attacks on September 11, 2001, received attention from writers on the media. She was also featured in the 2021 Wondrium documentary "Reporting 9/11 and Why it Still Matters" and its companion documentary about women reporters who covered the attacks.

== Awards ==
- Gracie Award in the “series – radio non-commercial local” category for her 2018 coverage of a Guatemalan woman separated from her three children as they sought asylum in the United States. Fertig's reporting prompted WNYC listeners to create an organization called New York Immigrant Families Together that helps bond migrants out of detention.
- Edward R. Murrow Award for an investigation of a subway fire that uncovered poor communication between the NYPD and the FDNY.
- Alfred I. duPont Columbia University Award for Broadcast Journalism for her series of reports in 2001 about an effort to privatize some struggling city schools.

== Works ==
- Why cant U teach me 2 read?: Three Students and a Mayor Put Our Schools to the Test (Farrar, Straus and Giroux, 2009)
