= The Lost Lennon Tapes =

American music documentary series

- Online catalogue cover
- Genre: Radio documentary
- Running time: 1 hour
- Country of origin: United States
- Language: English
- Home station: Westwood One Radio Network
- Hosted by: Elliot Mintz
- Written by: Bert Kleinman
- Original release: January 24, 1988 – March 29, 1992
- No. of episodes: 219

The Lost Lennon Tapes was an American music documentary series presented by Elliot Mintz, comprising a three-hour premiere episode and 218 one-hour episodes, broadcast on the Westwood One Radio Network between 24 January 1988 and 29 March 1992. The show had about 7 million listeners weekly, and was broadcast in six countries.

== Origin of the tapes ==
John Lennon's wife, Yoko Ono, initiated this project to continue her husband's legacy for the fans and to share unreleased songs and recordings throughout the life of John Lennon. She wanted this series to not only appeal to Lennon fans, but also younger individuals interested in John Lennon or his creative process. Ono originally went to dinner with Elliot Mintz, a family friend of the Lennons, and Norman Pattiz, the founder of Westwood One, where they were able to form the idea. Masters of approximately 500 tapes, mostly cassettes and 1/4-inch tape on 7" reels, were then sent from the Lennons' archive in New York to Westwood One's studios in Culver City, California, where the researching, writing, and production began.

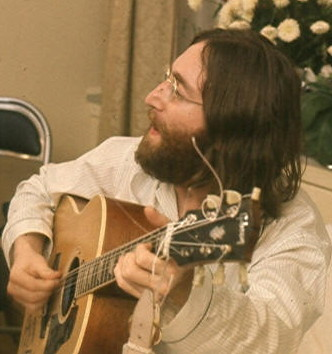
John Lennon rehearsing Give Peace A Chance in 1969, featured in the premiere and other episodes of The Lost Lennon Tapes.

Westwood One staff producer Stephen K. Peeples was the original writer and producer of the series, scripting the first 128 episodes, with David C. Kephart as the original production engineer. Peeples and Kephart received the tapes in December 1987, and worked with a team of Westwood One engineers day and night to skim through and log hundreds of hours of material. Production copies were made and the masters were eventually returned to Ono. Mark Lewisohn, a Beatles historian, also worked on the project as the series' research consultant. Mintz was the primary voice of the series, and Scott Muni of WNEW-FM New York voiced each show's introduction, segment bumpers, and credits. The series began airing shortly after in February 1988, expected to only last a year.

== The radio show ==
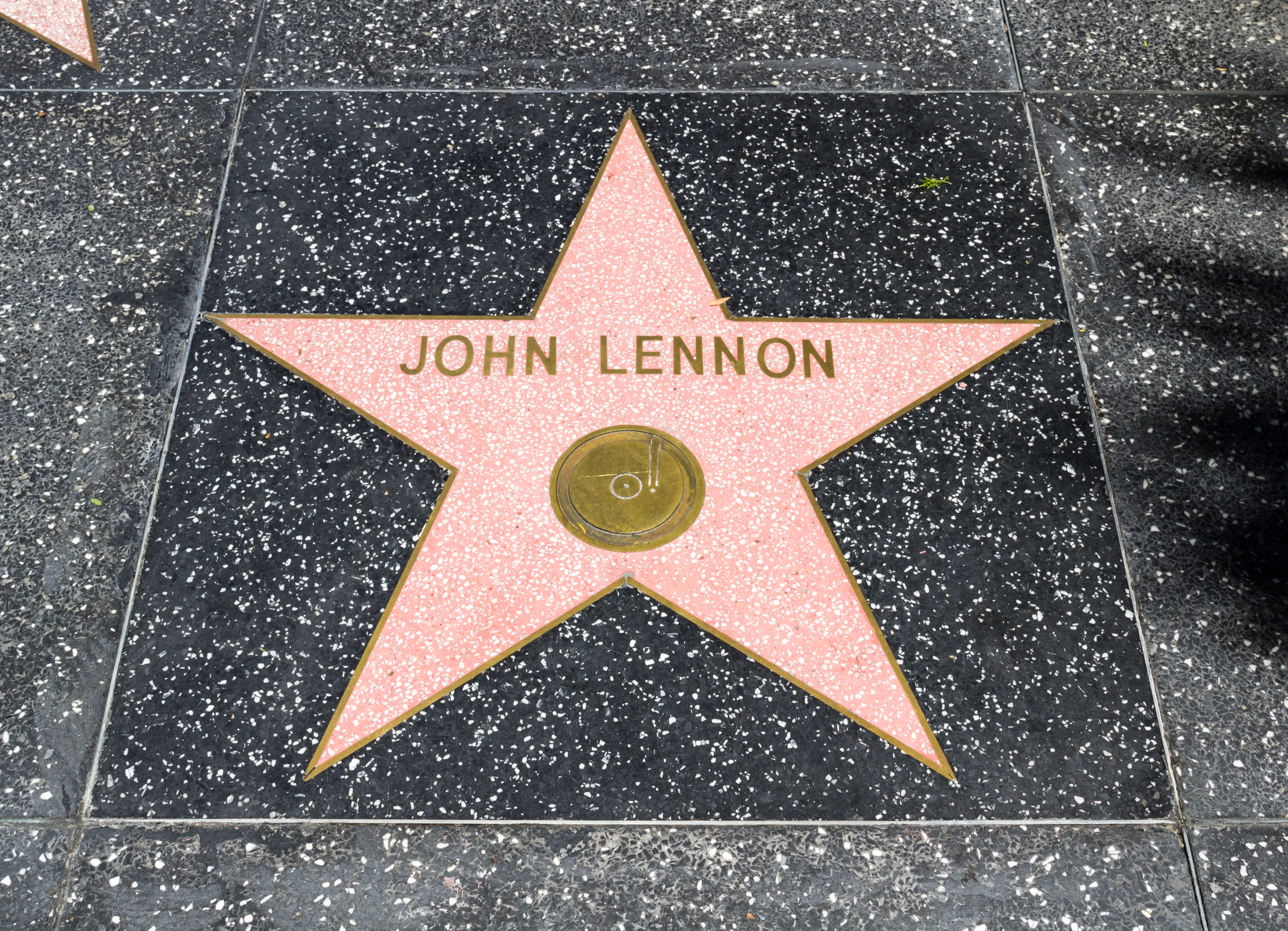
John Lennon's Hollywood star, placed on Hollywood Boulevard in 1988.

The premiere episode, written by independent producer Bert Kleinman, features an introduction from John Lennon's wife, Yoko Ono, explaining why she chose to give Westwood One Radio access to the tapes on which the series' content is based. The Lost Lennon Tapes aired weekly, broadcasting music and interviews spanning John Lennon's life and career, from his childhood in Liverpool to his years as a member of The Beatles and then as a solo artist. Out of the 814 songs heard throughout the series, 533 had been previously unreleased commercially. Lennon's creative process as a songwriter and recording artist was demonstrated as numerous songs were traced from early home demos to the actual studio productions, such as the solo hits "(Just Like) Starting Over", "Imagine", and "Strawberry Fields Forever" by The Beatles. Other moments shared in the series consisted of interviews with John Lennon about his life, music, and political views, radio and television appearances, conversations with family members, and interviews with many of John's colleagues. The producers also incorporated certain specials, one dedicated to the ceremony of John Lennon's Hollywood star on the Hollywood Walk of Fame in 1988.

Yoko Ono described the selection of Elliot Mintz as the presenter not so much as a choice, but a "karmic destiny," as Mintz had been a close friend of the Lennons for some time. Mintz shared some of these intimate moments on the tapes with the family, such as big moments with John's sons, Julian and Sean.

== Reviews ==
Mark Lewisohn wrote his own subset of reviews of The Lost Lennon Tapes in The Beatles Monthly magazine each week for Lennon and Beatles fans in the United Kingdom, where the series did not air. He commended the show on their good mix of material, specifically interview and music archives. During the time period of this series, Ono also concurrently was working on developing John Lennon Anthology, issued about six years after The Lost Lennon Tapes in 1998; some of the recordings featured throughout the series also appear on the Beatles Anthology documentary series, which began three years after the final broadcast of this radio series.

== See also ==
- The John Lennon Collection
- John Lennon Anthology
- List of songs recorded by the Beatles
- Radio Programs
