= Collaborative translation =

Collaborative translation is a translation technique that has been created or enabled by modern translation technology where multiple participants can collaborate on the same document simultaneously, generally sharing a computer-assisted translation interface that includes tools for collaboration.

Collaborative translation should not be confused with crowdsourcing: the two are very different, although the techniques can be used together.

Collaborative translation must not be confused with cooperative translation. On one hand, cooperative translation is defined as any activity pertaining to the translation process (translating text parts, editing, revision), and to any other necessary step (contact with clients, administrative preparation) which is carried out by multiple people, coordinated by one common figure. On the other hand, collaborative translation is defined as sharing the same tasks/objectives; in this case, all members work on the same task (in synchronous or asynchronous mode).

== Definitions ==
Collaborative translation techniques are frequently confused with crowdsourcing techniques, even by managers who work in translation industry.

Collaborative translation refers to the technique of having multiple translation participants with varying tasks participate simultaneously in a collaborative workspace with shared resources. It is a new technique made possible by cloud computing. The purpose of collaborative translation is to reduce the total time of the translation lifecycle, improve communications, particularly between translator and non-translator participants, and eliminate many management tasks.

Crowdsourcing (in the translation industry) refers to the practice of assigning translation tasks to a group of individuals via a "flexible open call". The purpose of crowdsourcing in the translation industry is to simplify the translation assignment phase of the lifecycle, reduce translation rates, and in some implementations, get translation for free.

For example, a crowdsourced document translation could be accepted by ten individuals in a crowd, each of whom has been assigned a piece of the larger document. Parsing a document, in itself, is not collaborative translation, because there is no real collaboration happening. However, when those ten individuals use collaborative translation technology to work and communicate simultaneously amongst themselves and with other collaborators like subject matter experts, managers, proofreaders, etc., it becomes collaborative translation (that included a crowdsourcing phase).

== Relation to cloud computing ==
Cloud computing revolutionized the translation industry and introduced collaborative translation. Managers, translators, and proofreaders, who previously had traditional CAT tools installed on their desktops, could now login to the same system at the same time, sharing translation memory resources in real-time and collaborating via communication features available in the workspace.

Traditional translation workflows were typically lock-step affairs, where the document first went to A where it was translated, then to B where it was proofread, and maybe to C where a subject matter expert might review it. Questions and answers were typically handled by the translation manager. However, by allowing all the participants to share resources and work simultaneously in a single, cloud-based workspace, the lifecycle was shortened and quality increased.

== Research projects on collaborative translation ==
In 2023, the "Collaborative translation: approaches and perspectives" international research project carried out by IULM University (Italy, Milan) since 2021 officially turned into the International Center for Research on Collaborative Translation. The Center aims at producing innovative, cutting-edge research within the field of Translation Studies, promoting the establishment of a worldwide scientific community. So far, the Center has produced the first bibliography on collaborative translation, which serves as a great starting point for any other scholars and researchers who may be interested in the subject.
