= Easy 96 =

Indian radio station in New York City

Coordinates: 40.7468°N 73.9860°W

- Former logo

New York, New York; United States
- Broadcast area: New York City, parts of New Jersey, New York and Connecticut
- Frequencies: WQXR 105.9/92 kHz subcarrier; via satellite

Programming
- Format: Popular Hindi Music, Top 40 Hits, Hindi Classics, Film Soundtracks, News, General, Entertainment and Educational Features

History
- First air date: March 15, 1989

Technical information
- Power: 50,000 Watts

Links
- Webcast: www.rbcradio.com/listennow.html
- Website: www.easy96.com

Easy 96 (formerly RBC Radio) is a 24/7 subsidiary communications authority radio station providing South Asian-Indian American programming that serves New York City and the Tri-State area of neighboring Northern New Jersey region, Connecticut, and parts of New York State.

== History ==
Founded by Rohit Jagessar, an Indo-Guyanese American, RBC Radio began broadcasting on March 15, 1989. The first Asian-Indian radio station in the US, its first broadcasts were on PanAmSat Satellites (Intelsat) SAT COM R3, transponder 16 and on the 92 kHz subcarrier WNYE-FM, before moving to the 92 kHz subcarrier signal of The New York Times WQXR-FM, as well as on the AfriStar and AsiaStar Satellites covering four continents.

The station's rise in popularity in the Greater New York market took place mainly after it was launched on the New York Times subcarrier signal. It soon became the home for both Bollywood and Indo Caribbean artists to promote their latest films and music.

Maine Pyar Kiya, Dilwale Dulhania Le Jayenge, Hum Aapke Hain Koun, Kuch Kuch Hota Hai, Kabhi Khushi Kabhie Gham and Kaho Na Pyar Hai, are some of the most noted Bollywood film music that made their US debut on the station.

In addition to film music, hit songs such as Paree Hoon Mein, Made in India, San Ni Dha Pa, Bolo Ta Ra Ra, Vande Mataram and Sifir all had their US debut on the station.

Some of the singers that appeared in features and interviews on the station are Suneeta Rao, A. R. Rahman, Daler Mehndi, Sundar Popo, Alisha Chinai, Asha Bhosle, Kanchan, Sonu Nigam, Alka Yagnik, Rahat Fateh Ali Khan, Runa Laila, Kumar Sanu, Kavita Krishnamurti, Musarrat Nazir, Shaan, Udit Narayan, Amitabh Bachchan, Shankar Mahadevan, Hariharan and Jagjit Singh.

The station broadcasts in English, Hindi, Urdu, Bengali, Gujarati and Punjabi languages.

Mr. Rohit Jagessar has produced and hosted 37,960 hours of broadcasts for the station.
