= Compliance =

Compliance may refer to:

== Healthcare ==
- Compliance (medicine), a patient's (or doctor's) adherence to a recommended course of treatment
- Compliance (physiology), the tendency of a hollow organ to resist recoil toward its original dimensions (this is a specific usage of the mechanical meaning)
  - Pulmonary compliance (or lung compliance), change in lung volume for applied or dynamic pressure
- Compliance (psychology), responding favorably to a request offered by others

== Other uses ==
- Compliance (film), released in 2012
- "Compliance" (song), single from the 2022 studio album by the English rock band Muse
- Compliance, in mechanical science, is the inverse of stiffness
- Compliant mechanism, a flexible mechanism
- Environmental compliance, conforming to environmental laws, regulations, standards and other requirements
- Regulatory compliance, adherence to standards, regulations, and other requirements
- Compliance with web standards

== See also ==
- Governance, risk management, and compliance
