= Business-education partnerships =

A business–education partnership is an agreement of collaboration between schools and businesses, unions, governments or community organizations. These partnerships are established by agreement between two or more parties to establish goals, and to construct a plan of action for achievement of those goals.

Business-education partnerships may involve entire school boards and hundreds of students. Others pair private partners with a single class or individual students. Business-education partnerships serve business and industry by providing activities such as in-service training to employees, use of facilities, student directed projects, software development or marketing research. They also serve to strengthen instruction in academic skills and to enrich the educational process through the talents and ideas of the personnel of participating businesses.

== Types of business-education partnerships ==
Frank and Smith (1997), have suggested four classifications for business-education partnerships based on the process the partnership employs. They found that most business-education partnerships could be categorized into one of the four classifications.

- Consultative partnerships are for the purpose of receiving public input around change or to gather ideas for policies.
- Contributory partnerships are formed to benefit an organization or the community.
- Operational partnerships are work-sharing arrangements in which the components of a given task are delegated to specific parties.
- Collaborative partnerships are set up to share resources, risks and decision-making.

== Examples of business-education partnership activities ==
There are hundreds of activities in which businesses and schools can engage. These may include:

- Workshops, conferences, tours, exchange programs, classroom visits, assemblies, workplace visits, science fairs, guest speakers; seminars; presentations;
- Work experience programs, internships, tutoring, skills training, career development activities;
- Mentoring, job–shadowing, apprenticeship, and on–the job training;
- Recruiting, training, school to career information, guidance;
- Curriculum support, teacher development, teacher placements;
- Grants, scholarships, equipment, money, fund-raising; starting an education foundation;

== Achievements of a business-education partnership ==
Partnerships with schools may:

- improve the quality of the workplace,
- provide employees with learning experiences and a new understanding of the educational system,
- provide opportunities for student's career exploration,
- bring resources to enrich the curriculum,
- ensure that school teaching is relevant to the skills required of industry,
- improve the education setting through upgrading facilities or equipment,
- integrate young people into the labour market by involving them in cooperative education experiences,
- connect schools with local businesses,
- assist with curriculum development, new learning opportunities and skill development,
- meet the labour market needs of business and industry.

== Building a business-education partnership ==
It may involve:

- recognizing opportunities for change
- mobilizing people and resources to create changes
- developing a vision of long-term change
- seeking support and involvement from partners
- choosing an effective group of involved participants
- building trust among collaborators, and
- developing learning opportunities and benefits for all partners.

== Lessons learned: assessing the long-term impact of short-term results ==
Donald M. Clark of The American Association for Career Education (AACE), concurs with the report to Congress on the implementation of the School-to-Work Opportunities Act of 1994 that "more must be done to involve employers." He states that studies of "business-education partnerships" since the White House announcement in 1983 urging this type of connection between the two sectors, have consistently pointed out that they have had little, if any, impact on producing fundamental change in the educational system. More specifically, they rarely encompass attempts to affect the curriculum, the overall educational process, or the acquisition of basic skills. Nor have they significantly affected the dropout rate of participating students (Clark, 1996). The evidence of this growing disenchantment by business and industry was seen in the nationwide surveys of employers conducted by the National Center on the Education quality of the Workforce (EQW). The surveys revealed that most partnerships have diffuse and unquantifiable goals and most of the partnership activities are brief and episodic and involve low levels of investment; they seldom run long enough to make a long-term difference.

HRDC’s evaluation of programs for in-school youth, taken from its June 1997 final report on the Effectiveness of Employment-Related Programs for Youth: Lessons Learned from Past Experience sheds more light on the long-term impact of limited short-term results. This study found that the most effective programs for young people provide sustained adult contact. Results indicate that the most effective strategies for keeping young people in school are those that build bridges to the world of work while young people are still in school. The most effective strategies were found to combine a training component with strong links to the employer community, more formal training linked to on-the-job training and work experience, and job search assistance and transitional wage subsidies (HRDC June 1997). There is some evidence that co-operative education programs lead to improved employment outcomes in post-secondary school although the number of work experience placements offered by employers is quite limited. There are a number of concerns regarding the presence of corporations in the school. There is a fear that the active involvement of business will encourage governments to retreat from their role as the primary funders of education (Torjman, 1998). Other issues of corporate involvement in schools reveal disquieting implications of a corporate ideology and ethos entering the learning experience of our young people (Hill and McGowan, 1996). Teachers are concerned that partnerships with corporations involved in military research and development send a clear message to students. The presence of military contractors in classrooms suggests that schools are not concerned with violence and oppression in the world (Hill and McGowan, 1996). Some school boards have developed business-education guidelines which are intended to act as a code that partners can apply to regulate themselves throughout the duration of the partnership but according to the Conference Board of Canada, guidelines and codes of conduct differ significantly (Hill and McGowan, 1996). A code of conduct serves as a screening process to ensure that only socially-responsible businesses are granted access to schools and the partnerships activities would be monitored by an external evaluation committee of parents, community members, teachers and business representatives.
