= Role-based collaboration =

Academic area of social research

Role-Based Collaboration (RBC) represents an emerging research area.

RBC is an approach that can be used to integrate the theory of roles into Computer-Supported Cooperative Work (CSCW) systems and other computer-based systems. It consists of a set of concepts, principles, mechanisms and methods. RBC presents challenges and benefits not found in traditional CSCW systems. This research will bring exciting improvements to the development and application of CSCW systems and methodologies of collaboration.

Even though we proposed RBC from the point of view of CSCW, we could expand RBC to more fields. RBC can be divided into two categories: special RBC and general RBC. Special RBC means role-based CSCW or HCI. To perform better system analysis, design, implementation, application and evaluations, it is hoped to apply role theory to CSCW or Human Computer Interaction (HCI) systems. Therefore, the gap can be bridged between their developers and the sociologists who are more concerned with the usability of CSCW systems. General RBC is to extend special RBC to the areas such as software engineering, social psychology, organization, management, and artificial intelligence (AI). General RBC considers not only supporting cooperation among people (CSCW) with computers but also that among the components of a system and between people and machines

== See also ==
- Role-playing game
- Commons-based peer production
- Enterprise social networking
