= RBC Plaza =

RBC Plaza may refer to several current and former office towers of the Royal Bank of Canada:

== Current ==
- Royal Bank Plaza, Toronto, Ontario
- RBC Plaza (Minneapolis), Minnesota

== Former ==
- PNC Plaza (Raleigh), North Carolina
