= Jack Gariss =

Personal life
- Born: October 19, 1920 Nebraska, U.S.
- Died: January 19, 1985 (aged 64) Los Angeles, California, U.S.

Religious life
- Religion: Taoism

Jack Gariss (/ˈɡærɪs/ GARR-iss; October 19, 1920 – January 19, 1985) was an American spiritual teacher and meditation instructor, and a radio personality on KPFK in Los Angeles from the 1960s until his death.

As a young man, in the 1950s, Jack Gariss attended University of Southern California and worked for Cecil B. DeMille. Most notably, he has a co-writing credit on DeMille's The Ten Commandments.

In the late 1960s, Gariss began teaching meditation and started recording radio shows for KPFK about meditation and spiritual topics. Over the years, the shows were variously titled The Mystic Circle, then The Wayless Way, then Bio Meditation, then Bio-Cosmology, but are now routinely rebroadcast as Bio Meditation on Roy of Hollywood's KPFK show, on most Thursday nights and Friday mornings. Gariss, assisted by his wife Janette, taught people how to identify and control and produce alpha brain waves (the "energy signature of the serene mind" – Maslow) at his home in the San Fernando Valley. He had a substantial library and was the perennial student of religion and spirituality. He seemed to gravitate to Eastern religions, particularly Taoism.

== Quotes ==
"Every note is heard in silence.... for that silence is the birth of every note."

"This is the map, not the territory. The territory is when you stop listening. The territory is when you turn it all off, and tune in. Then the reality comes."

"Perhaps the biggest test of our intelligence and compassion, the most crucial watershed of human development since the inception of agriculture, even more important than the founding of cities, is the present issue of war and peace. Yes, this is a tremendous burden and responsibility, but if we fail this may well become another dead planet like Mars and Venus, rather unimportant planets circling around a rather unimportant star, in an unimportant part of the galaxy. If we can find a solution, through understanding, co-operation, compassion, a new form of morality which takes into account the sacredness of every life form, then this will be a period remembered very far into the future, as a legendary time of giants. It is up to us. I think that research has put to rest the idea that aggression arose because of an aggressive gene that exists within us, that we are the Naked Apes who killed, as in some currently prevailing theories."
