= Dave Emory =

American talk radio host

David Emory (born 1949) is an American talk radio host and conspiracy theorist, born in New York City, based in the San Francisco Bay Area. Self-described "anti-fascist researcher", he is known for his radio show which purports to uncover neo-fascism and neo-Nazism; among his more notable claims is that the Bush family was connected to the Third Reich.

== Weekly radio programs ==
Dave Emory, since the 1980s, has produced, written and hosted several radio programs: The Guns of November, Miscellaneous Archive Shows, One Step Beyond and Anti-Fascist Archives (formerly Radio Free America). In 1983, Emory and "Nip Tuck" (AKA Tad Williams) created The Guns of November, a four-part four-hour-long-segments series on the Kennedy assassination for Foothill College's radio station, KFJC, in Los Altos Hills, California. Emory became co-host of KFJC's One Step Beyond which started in 1979 and was a multi-hour Sunday night phone-in show hosted by Nip Tuck focused on political topics emphasising "Nazi spies, CIA mind control experiments and mercenaries, among others." In the 2000s, Emory's For the Record series has aired every Monday on KKUP-FM, Cupertino, California, Wednesday on WFMU in Jersey City, in the early a.m. hours Thursday on KPFK in Los Angeles, Thursdays and Fridays on KFJC, and Fridays on WCBN-FM in Ann Arbor. Descriptions and summaries of For the Record programs are archived and maintained by SpitfireList.com. Audio archives are maintained by WFMU.

Recent programs consist of two 30-minute monologues or telephone interviews on one or more topics, including fascism, corporatism, genocide, the Cold War, Fifth column movements and international banking scandals. Recurring topics also include the Kennedy assassination and its alleged relations to the FBI, George H. W. Bush, Richard Nixon and the Watergate scandal, German-controlled industry and banking, the Muslim Brotherhood, the O. J. Simpson murder case, 9/11, the Bush family and its business connections to the Osama Bin Laden family and the Third Reich (through Senator Prescott Bush), the P-2 Lodge, disinformation, mind control and cults. Interview guests include writer Kevin Coogan, author John Loftus, author Sterling Seagrave, freelance journalist and 2004 presidential candidate John Buchanan, and investigative journalists Lucy Komisar and Robert Parry.

== "The Underground Reich" ==
Emory frequently propounds the existence of an "Underground Reich" as a central feature of his broader theses. He argues this entity maintains the long-term interests of German-based multinational conglomerates, and includes heavy industry, chemicals, communications, as well as international shipping, banking and financial interests. Emory contends that the many units which make up the "Underground Reich", having survived World War II, persist and flourish as major components of the current global capital elite.

Boris Kachka of New York Magazine wrote, "According to Dave Emory’s radio programs, nearly every figure in world politics is a tendril of the 'Underground Reich', a network including Hitler's personal secretary". Kachka agrees there were obvious connections between the Nazi regime and major international companies in the time around World War II, "but Emory’s present-day analysis is a little more paranoid, even for the age of WikiLeaks".

== See also ==
- Mae Brussell
- Operation INFEKTION
