= Evan Rosen =

American journalist

- Born: New York, New York, U.S.
- Education: University of Michigan
- Occupations: Author, Speaker, Strategist, Journalist
- Website: thecultureofcollaboration.com/the-author-evan-rosen.php

Evan Rosen is an American author, speaker, business strategist, and journalist. He is executive director of The Culture of Collaboration Institute and Chief Strategist of Impact Video Communication, Inc., which he co-founded.

Rosen is the author of The Culture of Collaboration series of books. The series includes The Culture of Collaboration (ISBN 978-0-9774617-0-7), a Gold Medal Winner in the Axiom Business Book Awards. Companies used as case studies in the book include Boeing, Toyota, Dow Chemical Company, Procter & Gamble, BMW, Mayo Clinic, Myelin Repair Foundation, Industrial Light & Magic and DreamWorks Animation. The other book in the series is The Bounty Effect: 7 Steps to The Culture of Collaboration (ISBN 978-0977461776). The Bounty Effect includes a back-cover endorsement from Steve Wozniak, co-founder of Apple. The expanded and updated edition of The Culture of Collaboration (ISBN 978-0-9774617-9-0) was released in September 2024. The subtitle of the new edition is Deserializing Time, Talent and Tools to Create Value in the Local and Global Economy. The expanded and updated edition adds collaborative diversity as an additional cultural element to the Ten Cultural Elements of Collaboration Rosen identifies in the first edition so that there are now Eleven Cultural Elements of Collaboration.

== Work ==
The Culture of Collaboration shows how collaboration creates business value and demonstrates how collaborative culture is changing business models and the nature of work. Terms Rosen coins in the book include mirror zones, which are time zones that are opposite or nearly opposite, and the Ten Cultural Elements of Collaboration. According to a review by the Axiom Business Book Awards, “Whether it is dealing with the changing trends of business or the basic cultural elements that enable collaboration, Rosen is able to offer insight on every situation.” According to a profile of Rosen in the MIT Technology Review, “American society, says Rosen, encourages individualism and a star system, which inhibits the very collaboration that he maintains can make companies more effective.”

In the expanded and updated edition of The Culture of Collaboration, published in 2024, Rosen shows how to reimagine business models “by collapsing outmoded sequential approaches and replacing them with spontaneous, real-time processes. He goes back inside collaborative organizations profiled in the first edition including Toyota, Mayo Clinic, Boeing, and Industrial Light & Magic. The book explores why some organizations win at collaboration while others fail and shows how any organization or team can instill collaborative culture. The expanded and updated edition includes new chapters on “Collaborating with Robots and Intelligent Agents” and “The Brave New World of Trust and Security.”

The Bounty Effect: 7 Steps to The Culture of Collaboration provides a framework for replacing obsolete Industrial Age organizational structures based on command-and-control with collaborative organizational structures designed for the Information Age. The book gets its name from the mutiny that occurred on the H.M.S. Bounty in 1789. Rosen uses the mutiny to illustrate how exigent circumstances compel companies, governments and organizations to change their structures from command-and-control to collaborative. According to a review in Publishers Weekly: “In his book, Rosen, an internationally recognized collaboration and communication strategist, presents seven steps to establishing a collaborative culture within an organization, moving away from the Industrial Age mentality to one better suited for the Information Age.”

Rosen is also the author of Personal Videoconferencing (Manning/Prentice Hall, 1996, ISBN 978-0-13-268327-2), the first book on PC-based videoconferencing. In the book, he coined the word collabicate, which means to collaborate and communicate.

== Biography ==
Rosen's “Collaboration” columns have appeared on Bloomberg BusinessWeek.com. His work has been featured in media outlets including the Washington Post, Wall Street Journal, MIT Technology Review, Forbes, Washington Times, CT Insider, IndustryWeek, Investor’s Business Daily, NetworkWorld, Communication World, and Leader to Leader among others. He has also appeared on CNN, CBS News, and CNBC including CNBC’s “Collaboration Now” primetime special.

On the sixth anniversary of the 9/11 terrorist attacks, Rosen delivered a keynote speech to the United States Intelligence Community at the Office of the Director of National Intelligence (ODNI). The speech focused on how to adopt cross-agency collaborative culture and processes. Rosen has also delivered keynote speeches globally at corporate and government events including the National conference on Clinical Research in Gothenburg, Sweden and the Tagetik User Conference in Lucca, Italy. He has also lectured at the Brookings Institution and the Stanford University Center for Professional development.

Rosen spent his early career reporting on Silicon Valley and the automobile industry for television stations. He has held news positions at KICU-TV in San Jose, WTOL-TV in Toledo, WABC-TV in New York, WXYZ-TV in Detroit, KODE-TV in Joplin, Missouri, and WCBN-FM in Ann Arbor.

He holds a B.A. in history from the University of Michigan -Ann Arbor where he was news director and a member of the board of directors of the Campus Broadcasting Network. He is also a graduate of Horace Mann School in New York City” where he was executive editor of The Record.
