= Philip H. Mirvis =

- Born: 1951 (age 74–75)
- Education: Yale University (B.A.), University of Michigan (Ph.D.)
- Occupation: Industrial and organizational psychology

Philip H. Mirvis (born 1951) is an organizational psychologist and faculty member at Boston College, in the Center for Corporate Citizenship. He has written ten books on topics in large-scale organizational change, corporate governance, and the characteristics of the workforce and workplace. He has served as an adviser on corporate social responsibility and sustainability to companies including Ben & Jerry's, Mitsubishi, PepsiCo, Royal Dutch Shell, SK Group, Unilever, and Wipro.

Mirvis has a B.A. from Yale University and a Ph.D. in Organizational Psychology from the University of Michigan. He has taught at Boston University, Shanghai Jiao Tong University, and the London Business School, and he has been a visiting researcher at the University of Pretoria and the International Executive Development Center in Bled, Slovenia. He is a Senior Fellow in Social Innovation at the Lewis Institute at Babson College, and a former trustee of the Society for Organizational Learning.

With Managing the Merger coauthor Mitchell L. Marks, Mirvis was dubbed a "merger maven" by Fortune.

== Works ==
Mirvis writes a blog on corporate social responsibility for the U.S. Chamber of Commerce. His writings on the topic have appeared in the Harvard Business Review, the Journal of Business & Society, Corporate Governance, and California Management Review. His books include:

- Failures in Organizational Development and Change (1978, with David N. Berg)
- Assessing Organizational Change: A Guide to Methods, Measures & Practices (editor; 1983, with Stanley E. Seashore, Edward E. Lawler, and Cortlandt Cammann)
- The Cynical Americans: Living and Working in an Age of Discontent and Disillusion (1989, with Donald L. Kanter)
- Managing the Merger: Making it Work (1992, with Mitchell L. Marks)
- Building the Competitive Workforce: Investing in Human Capital for Corporate Success (editor; 1993)
- To the Desert and Back: The Story of the Most Dramatic Business Transformations on Record (2007, with Karen Ayas and George Roth)
- Beyond Good Company: Next Generation Corporate Citizenship (2007, with Bradley K. Googins and Steven A. Rochlin)
- Joining Forces: Making One Plus One Equal Three in Mergers, Acquisitions, and Alliances (2010, with Mitchell L. Marks)
- Building Networks and Partnerships: Organizing for Sustainable Effectiveness (author and editor; 2013, edited with Christopher G. Worley and Susan A. Mohrman)

=== Reception ===
In reviewing The Cynical Americans, Choice questioned "the nature of the evidentiary framework and the absence of longitudinal trends" presented, but noted that that concern did not weaken "the authors' premise of historical cycles or their very useful chapters on mechanisms to reduce worker cynicism". Choice recommended Building the Competitive Workforce, for which Mirvis provided the opening and closing chapters, for "advanced undergraduate through professional collections". They described Beyond Good Company as "thoroughly researched", and recommended it highly.

John Elkington, originator of the triple bottom line, described the authors of Beyond Good Company as "a supergroup in their field".
