= The Culture of Collaboration =

Book by Evan Rosen

- Author: Evan Rosen
- Language: English
- Series: The Culture of Collaboration
- Genre: Business, business structural adjustment, organizational change
- Publisher: Red Ape Publishing
- Publication date: 2007, 2009, 2024
- Media type: Print (hardcover)
- Pages: xii, 363 pp.
- ISBN: 978-0-9774617-9-0
- OCLC: 1405190585

The Bounty Effect: 7 Steps to the Culture of Collaboration
- Author: Evan Rosen
- Language: English
- Series: The Culture of Collaboration
- Genre: Business, business structural adjustment, organizational change
- Publisher: Red Ape Publishing
- Publication date: 2013
- Media type: Print (hardcover)
- Pages: x, 329 pp.
- ISBN: 978-0-9774617-7-6
- OCLC: 824088001

The Culture of Collaboration is a business book by Evan Rosen. It's the first book in The Culture of Collaboration series by Rosen. The second book in the series is The Bounty Effect: 7 Steps to the Culture of Collaboration. The Bounty Effect includes a back-cover endorsement from Steve Wozniak, co-founder of Apple.

The Culture of Collaboration is a gold medal winner in the Axiom Business Book Awards. The book explores how collaborative culture is changing business models and the nature of work. The author goes inside highly-collaborative organizations including Boeing, Toyota, the Dow Chemical Company, Procter & Gamble, DreamWorks Animation, Industrial Light & Magic, the Myelin Repair Foundation, and the Mayo Clinic. He explains how their methods can create value in almost any industry. The book also describes the trend towards real-time, spontaneous collaboration and the deserialization of interaction and work. In his preface, Rosen explains that his idea for the book originated when he was invited to the BMW engineering center in Munich during the final design stage for the X5 sports activity vehicle. Among the terms Rosen coins in the book are mirror zones and the ten cultural elements of collaboration.

According to a review by the Axiom Business Book Awards, “Whether it is dealing with the changing trends of business or the basic cultural elements that enable collaboration, Rosen is able to offer insight on every situation.” In his review of The Culture of Collaboration, author and business journalist James Srodes writes, “Evan Rosen, a San Francisco-based corporate strategist, has produced the best of the current crop…The culture of collaboration is already what is happening in what may be the most exciting business development since the assembly line.”

Business leaders who provided back-cover endorsements for The Culture of Collaboration include Jimmy Wales, co-founder of Wikipedia; Scott Cook, founder of Intuit; Jeff Raikes, former CEO of the Bill and Melinda Gates Foundation and former Microsoft president, Douglas E. Van Houweling, President and CEO of Internet2, and Eugene Kranz, flight director of Apollo 13. A Russian language edition of The Culture of Collaboration is published by Ecom Publishers of Moscow.

In the expanded and updated edition of The Culture of Collaboration, published in 2024, Rosen explores how collaboration has evolved—and in some cases retreated—within organizations profiled in the first edition and in society. He shows how to reimagine business models “by collapsing outmoded sequential approaches and replacing them with spontaneous, real-time processes.” This edition takes a deeper dive into the evolution of collaboration at Boeing based on interviews with key leaders on the 787 and 777X programs.

The expanded and updated edition includes new chapters on “Collaborating with Robots and Intelligent Agents” and “The Brave New World of Trust and Security.” Terms Rosen coins in the expanded and updated edition include the ten anti-collaborative cultural artifacts and the eleven cultural elements of collaboration which adds an additional cultural element to the ten cultural elements of collaboration he describes in the book’s first edition. The expanded and updated edition has a new subtitle: Deserializing Time, Talent and Tools to Create Value in the Local and Global Economy.

The Bounty Effect: 7 Steps to The Culture of Collaboration provides a framework for replacing obsolete Industrial Age organizational structures based on command-and-control with collaborative organizational structures designed for the Information Age. The book gets its name from the mutiny that occurred on the H.M.S. Bounty in 1789. Rosen uses the mutiny to illustrate how exigent circumstances compel companies, governments and organizations to change their structures from command-and-control to collaborative. According to a review in Publishers Weekly: “In his book, Rosen, an internationally recognized collaboration and communication strategist, presents seven steps to establishing a collaborative culture within an organization, moving away from the Industrial Age mentality to one better suited for the Information Age.”
