= Infosys Prize =

Annual award given by the Infosys Science Foundation

The Infosys Prize
- Awarded for: Contributions in six categories of research: 1. Engineering and Computer Science; 2. Humanities; 3. Life Sciences; 4. Mathematical Sciences; 5. Physical Sciences; 6. Social Sciences
- Country: India
- Presented by: Infosys Science Foundation
- Rewards: A gold medallion, a citation Certificate, and a monetary award of approx ₹95 lakh (US$100000 as of 2025)
- First award: 2008
- Website: www.infosys-science-foundation.com

The Infosys Prize is an annual award granted to scientists, researchers, engineers and social scientists of Indian origin (not necessarily born in India) by the Infosys Science Foundation and ranks among the highest monetary awards for research in India. The prize for each category includes a gold medallion, a citation certificate, and prize money of US$100,000 (or equivalent in Indian Rupees). The prize purse is tax free for winners living in India. The winners are selected by the jury of their respective categories, headed by the jury chairs.

In 2008, the prize was jointly awarded by the Infosys Science Foundation and National Institute of Advanced Studies for mathematics. The following year, three additional categories were added: Life Sciences, Mathematical Sciences, Physical Sciences and Social Sciences. In 2010, Engineering and Computer Science was added as a category. In 2012, a sixth category, Humanities, was added.

== Laureates in Engineering and Computer Science ==
The Infosys Prize in Engineering and Computer Science has been awarded annually since 2010.

Year	Laureate(s)	Institution(s)	Citation
2010	Ashutosh Sharma	Indian Institute of Technology Kanpur	Awarded "in recognition of his fundamental contributions to the fields of surfaces and interfaces, adhesion, pattern formation, nanocomposites, materials science, and hydrodynamics, which have practical applications in such areas as energy storage, filtration, micro-electro-mechanical systems (MEMS) and optoelectronics."
2011	Kalyanmoy Deb	Indian Institute of Technology Kanpur	Awarded "for his work in the fields of evolutionary multi-objective optimization and genetic algorithms."
2012	Ashish Kishore Lele	National Chemical Laboratory	Awarded "for his incisive contributions in molecular tailoring of stimuli responsive smart polymeric gels; exploring the anomalous behavior of rheologically complex fluids, and for building the bridge between macromolecular dynamics and polymer processing."
2013	V. Ramgopal Rao	Indian Institute of Technology Bombay	Awarded "for his wide-ranging contributions to nanoscale electronics, for integrating chemistry with mechanics and electronics to invent new functional devices, and for innovation and entrepreneurship in creating technologies and products of societal value."
2014	Jayant Haritsa	Indian Institute of Science	Awarded "for being a pioneer in the design and optimization of database engines that form the core of modern enterprise information systems. His many contributions have found direct use in various types of databases including decision‑support, biological and multilingual databases, as well as produced software tools for query optimization and metadata processing."
2015	Umesh Waghmare	Jawaharlal Nehru Centre for Advanced Scientific Research	Awarded "for his innovative use of first- principles theories and modeling in insightful investigations of microscopic mechanisms responsible for specific properties of specific materials such as topological insulators, ferroelectrics, multiferroics and 2-dimensional materials like graphene."
2016	Viswanathan Kumaran	Indian Institute of Science	Awarded "for his seminal work in complex fluids and complex flows and especially in transition and turbulence in soft-walled tubes and channels."
2017	Sanghamitra Bandyopadhyay	Indian Statistical Institute	Awarded "for her scholarly record in algorithmic optimization and for its significant impact on biological data analysis. Her discoveries include a genetic marker for breast cancer, determination of co-occurrence of HIV and cancers and the role of white matter in Alzheimer's disease."
2018	Navakanta Bhat	Indian Institute of Science, Bangalore	Awarded "for his work on the design of novel biosensors based on his research in biochemistry and gaseous sensors that push the performance limits of existing metal-oxide sensors. The prize recognizes his efforts to build a state-of-the-art infrastructure for research and talent training in nanoscale systems and for developing technologies for space and national security applications."
2019	Sunita Sarawagi	Indian Institute of Technology, Bombay	Awarded "for her research in databases, data mining, machine learning and natural language processing, and for important applications of these research techniques."
2020	Hari Balakrishnan	Massachusetts Institute of Technology	Awarded "for his broad contributions to computer networking, his seminal work on mobile and wireless systems."
2021	Chandrasekhar Nair	Molbio Diagnostics	Awarded for "his development and large-scale commercialization of Truenat, a new point-of-care testing platform for PCR-based medical diagnostics. Dr. Nair’s work has enabled testing for millions of COVID-19 cases across resource-limited settings in India and the diagnosis of multiple infectious diseases including tuberculosis all over the world."
2022	Suman Chakraborty	Indian Institute of Technology Kharagpur	Awarded for "his pioneering work in elucidating the interaction of fluid mechanics, interfacial phenomena, and electromechanics at the micro- and nanoscale. Using this understanding he has helped to advance healthcare in resource-limited settings through the invention of novel low-cost medical devices for sensing, diagnostics and therapeutics."
2023	Sachchida Nand Tripathi	Indian Institute of Technology Kanpur	Awarded "for the deployment of large-scale sensor-based air quality network and mobile laboratory for hyper local measurements of pollution, data generation and analysis using AI+ML for effective air quality management and citizen awareness, and for the discovery of new pathways of aerosols formation and growth that provide mechanistic understanding of haze formation."
2024	Shyam Gollakota	University of Washington	Awarded "for his impactful research and technology translation spanning multiple engineering domains in societally relevant areas such as smart-phone based affordable healthcare tools for low- and middle-income countries, battery-free computing and communication, and augmentation of human auditory sensing with artificial intelligence."
2025	Sushant Sachdeva	University of Toronto	Awarded "for his deep insights into mathematical optimization and the resolution of longstanding open questions in algorithmic theory that has established new standards on achievable performance in computational problems affecting information flows across societal lifelines, including the internet, transportation, and communication networks. He is a pioneer in theoretical computer science whose fundamental contributions have profoundly impacted many algorithmic challenges underlying modern society."

== Laureates in Humanities ==
The Infosys Prize in Humanities has been awarded annually since 2012.

Year	Laureate(s)	Institution(s)	Citation
2012	Sanjay Subrahmanyam	University of California, Los Angeles	Awarded "for his path-breaking contribution to history. He is an outstanding scholar of early-modern (1500-1800) South Asian history. He has been able to develop a new genre of 'connected history,’ involving persons, products, and social and political processes stretching from Melaka in the East to Portugal in the West."
2012	Amit Chaudhuri	University of East Anglia	Awarded "for his imaginative and illuminating writings in literary criticism, which reflect a complex literary sensibility, and great theoretical mastery, along with a probing sense of detail. The Infosys Prize recognizes and celebrates the intellectual reach and the quiet humanity in his extraordinary writings."
2013	Nayanjot Lahiri	University of Delhi	Awarded "for her outstanding contribution towards the integration of archaeological knowledge with the historical understanding of India from the earliest times. She is an exceptional scholar of proto-historic and early India. Her wide-ranging work on the past and present illuminates many aspects that include contemporary Indian society."
2013	Ayesha Kidwai	Jawaharlal Nehru University	Awarded "for her exceptional contribution to the field of theoretical linguistics. Her research on syntactic relations in Hindi-Urdu has related wider debates in linguistics to the study of Indian languages and has extended our understanding of India's linguistic diversity."
2014	Shamnad Basheer	Increasing Diversity by Increasing Access and SpicyIP	Awarded "for his outstanding contributions to a broad range of legal issues and legal education. He has been doing this with remarkable fair‑mindedness in assessing opposing positions taken on quintessentially controversial areas, such as intellectual property laws."
2015	Jonardon Ganeri	New York University	Awarded "for his outstanding scholarship and originality in interpreting and scrutinizing analytical Indian Philosophy. He has thrown light on the shared ground as well as the dichotomy between Indian and Greek traditions of philosophical reasoning, thereby illuminating both."
2016	Sunil Amrith	Harvard University	Awarded "for his outstanding contributions to the history of migration, environmental history, and the history of international public health, and in recognition of his field-changing research on the interrelated past of contemporary Asia."
2017	Ananya Jahanara Kabir	King's College London	Awarded "for her highly original explorations of the long-standing historical elements - conceptual, social and cultural - in colonial modernity, and for her subtle and insightful ethnography of cultural and political life in Kashmir."
2018	Kavita Singh	Jawaharlal Nehru University	Awarded "for her extraordinarily illuminating study of Mughal, Rajput and Deccan art, as well as her insightful writing on the historical function and role of museums and their significance in the increasingly fraught and conflicted social world in which visual culture exists today."
2019	Manu Devadevan	Indian Institute of Technology, Mandi	Awarded "for his highly original and wide-ranging work on pre-modern South India."
2020	Prachi Deshpande	Center for Studies in Social Sciences	Awarded "for her extraordinarily nuanced and highly sophisticated treatment of South Asian historiography."
2021	Ângela Barreto Xavier	University of Lisbon, Portugal	Awarded for "her deeply researched and sophisticated analysis of conversion and violence in the Portuguese empire in India, especially Goa.Her extensive body of writings in both English and Portuguese have shown Xavier to be an important and original voice on colonial and imperial history."
2022	Sudhir Krishnaswamy	National Law School of India University	Awarded for "his insightful understanding of the Indian Constitution, especially his carefully argued account of the importance of the landmark ‘basic structure doctrine’ adopted by the Supreme Court in 1973 that guides and constrains various efforts to amend it, while also ensuring its stability in the face of executive and legislative outcomes in India’s political life.
2023	Jahnavi Phalkey	Science Gallery Bengaluru	Awarded for "her brilliant and granular insights into the individual, institutional, and material histories of scientific research in modern India.
2024	Mahmood Kooria	University of Edinburgh, UK	Awarded for "his truly outstanding and seminal contributions to the study of maritime Islam in a global perspective...".
2025	Andrew Ollett	University of Chicago	Ollett is the world’s foremost scholar of the Prakrit languages in this generation. His book, Language of the Snakes, is a magisterial analysis of the cultural roles of Prakrit in tandem with Sanskrit and the Indian vernaculars over the last two thousand years. Andrew Ollett’s linguistic mastery and knowledge is breathtaking, ranging from detailed contributions to the study of Sanskrit, Prakrit, Kannada, Tamil, Old Javanese, and Chinese, in addition to his knowledge of the modern European languages and his training in Greek and Latin.

== Laureates in Life Sciences ==
The Infosys Prize in Life Sciences has been awarded annually since 2009.

Year	Laureate(s)	Institution(s)	Citation
2009	K. VijayRaghavan	National Centre for Biological Sciences	Awarded "for his many contributions as a developmental geneticist and neurobiologist."
2010	Chetan E. Chitnis	International Centre for Genetic Engineering and Biotechnology	Awarded "for his pioneering work in understanding the interactions of the malarial parasite and its host, leading to the development of a viable malaria vaccine."
2011	Imran Siddiqi	Centre for Cellular and Molecular Biology	Awarded "for his breakthrough contributions to the basic understanding of clonal seed formation in plants which can be applied to revolutionize agriculture, especially in the developing world."
2012	Satyajit Mayor	National Centre for Biological Sciences	Awarded "for new insights into regulated cell surface organization and membrane dynamics, necessary for understanding self-organization and trafficking of membrane molecules in living cells, and in signaling between cells."
2013	Rajesh Sudhir Gokhale	Institute of Genomics and Integrative Biology	Awarded "for his work in the field of lipid metabolism in M. tuberculosis. He discovered fatty acyl AMP ligases in tubercle bacillus, their role in the generation of the lipid components of its cell wall and of their existence in other organisms, where they play a role in biosynthesis of complex molecules."
2014	Shubha Tole	Tata Institute of Fundamental Research	Awarded "for her significant contributions to our understanding of how the brain's structure and circuitry are formed in the embryo. Her research uncovers common genetic mechanisms that control the development of the hippocampus, cortex and amygdala."
2015	Amit Prakash Sharma	International Centre for Genetic Engineering and Biotechnology	Awarded "for his pioneering contributions towards deciphering the molecular structure, at the atomic level, of key proteins involved in the biology of pathogenesis of the malarial parasite."
2016	Gagandeep Kang	Translational Health Science and Technology Institute	Awarded "for her pioneering contributions to understanding the natural history of rotavirus and other infectious diseases that are important both globally and in India. Her findings have enormous implications for vaccines and other public health measures to thwart these infections."
2017	Upinder Singh Bhalla	National Centre for Biological Sciences	Awarded "for his pioneering contributions to the understanding of the brain's computational machinery. His investigations have revealed essential neuronal computations that underlie the ability to acquire, integrate and store complex sensory information, and to utilize that information for decision and action."
2018	Roop Mallik	Tata Institute of Fundamental Research	Awarded "for his pioneering work on molecular motor proteins, which are crucial for the functioning of living cells. Mallik has identified and measured forces needed to transport large particles inside cells, and demonstrated their role in fundamental processes such as targeting pathogens for their destruction and moving lipid droplets for fatty acid regulation in the liver."
2019	Manjula Reddy	Center for Cellular and Molecular Biology	Awarded "for her groundbreaking discoveries concerning the structure of cell walls in bacteria."
2020	Rajan Sankaranarayanan	Center for Cellular and Molecular Biology	Awarded "for fundamental contributions towards understanding one of the most basic mechanisms in biology, the error-free translation of the genetic code to make protein molecules."
2021	Mahesh Sankaran	National Center for Biological Sciences, India	Awarded in "recognition of his pioneering work on the ecology of tropical savannah ecosystems, his contributions to highlighting the biodiversity of important Indian ecosystems such as the Western Ghats, and his input to international reports on climate change and biodiversity that have provided scientific evidence to policy makers."
2022	Vidita Vaidya	Tata Institute of Fundamental Research, Mumbai, India	Awarded "for her fundamental contributions to understanding brain mechanisms that underlie mood disorders such as anxiety and depression, including signals engaged by the neurotransmitter serotonin in causing persistent changes in behavior induced by early life stress and the role of serotonin in energy regulation in brain cells."
2023	Arun Kumar Shukla	Indian Institute of Technology, KanpurIIT Kanpur,	Awarded "for his outstanding contributions to the biology of G-protein coupled receptors (GPCRs), a key component of cell function. His studies have elegantly illustrated mechanisms that selectively activate signaling pathways downstream of GPCRs. These and other discoveries provide fundamental understanding of the context-dependent functions of GPCRs and suggest a new framework for the design of novel therapeutics."
2024	Siddhesh Kamat	Indian Institute of Science Education and Research, Pune	Awarded "for his discoveries concerning bioactive lipids and their receptors, and their metabolic and signaling pathways. His research using advanced methods to understand the function of lipids, a key component of cells, has important implications for understanding the role of these molecules in a range of cellular functions and human diseases."
2025	Anjana Badrinarayanan	National Centre for Biological Sciences, Bangalore	Awarded "for her pioneering contributions to understanding mechanisms of genome maintenance and repair. Through innovative live-cell imaging combined with genetic and cell biological approaches, her work has revealed fundamental principles of how DNA damage is repaired, demonstrated mutagenesis in non-dividing cells, and identified novel pathways of mitochondrial DNA damage responses, illuminating principles central to life and evolution."

== Laureates in Mathematical Sciences ==
The Infosys Prize in Mathematical Sciences has been awarded annually since 2008.

Year	Laureate(s)	Institution(s)	Citation
2008	Manindra Agrawal	Indian Institute of Technology Kanpur	Awarded "for his outstanding contribution in the field of complexity theory, a branch of mathematics and computer science concerned with the study of algorithms for solving mathematical and related scientific problems, and especially their efficiency and running times."
2009	Ashoke Sen	Harish-Chandra Research Institute	Awarded "for his fundamental contributions to Mathematical Physics, in particular, to String Theory."
2010	Chandrashekhar Khare	University of California, Los Angeles	Awarded "for his fundamental contributions to Number Theory, particularly his solution of the Serre conjecture."
2011	Kannan Soundararajan	Stanford University	Awarded "for his path breaking work in analytic number theory and development of new techniques to study critical values of general zeta functions to prove the Quantum Unique Ergodicity Conjecture for classical holomorphic forms."
2012	Manjul Bhargava	Princeton University	Awarded "for his extraordinarily original work in algebraic number theory. His work has revolutionized the way in which various fundamental arithmetic objects, such as number fields and elliptic curves, are understood."
2013	Rahul Pandharipande	ETH Zurich	Awarded "for his profound work in algebraic geometry. In particular, for his work on Gromov-Witten theory for Riemann surfaces, for predicting the connection between Gromov-Witten and Donaldson‑Thomas theories, and for his recent work with Aaron Pixton that establishes this connection for Calabi-Yau 3-folds."
2014	Madhu Sudan	Massachusetts Institute of Technology and Microsoft Research	Awarded "for his seminal contributions to theoretical computer science, especially in the areas of Probabilistically Checkable Proofs (PCP) and error‑correcting codes."
2015	Mahan Mj	Tata Institute of Fundamental Research	Awarded "for his outstanding contributions to geometric group theory, low-dimensional topology and complex geometry. In particular, for establishing a central conjecture in the Thurston program to study hyperbolic 3-manifolds and introducing important new tools to study fundamental groups of complex manifolds."
2016	Akshay Venkatesh	Stanford University	Awarded "for his exceptionally wide-ranging, foundational and creative contributions to modern number theory. His unique ability to use wide-ranging techniques drawn from analytic number theory, ergodic theory, homotopy theory to address concrete problems in number theory and discover new phenomena attest to the essential unity of mathematics."
2017	Ritabrata Munshi	Tata Institute of Fundamental Research	Awarded "for his outstanding contributions to analytic aspects of number theory. Besides ingenious contributions to the Diophantine problem, he has established important estimates known as sub-convexity bounds for a large class of L-functions with methods that are powerful and original."
2018	Nalini Anantharaman	University of Strasbourg	Awarded "for the effective use of entropy in the study of semiclassical limits of eigenstates in quantum analogs of chaotic dynamical systems and for her work on the delocalization of eigenfunctions on large regular graphs."
2019	Siddhartha Mishra	ETH Zürich	Awarded "for his outstanding contributions to Applied Mathematics, in particular for designing computational methods that solve non-linear partial differential equations arising in different areas, analyzing their effectiveness and designing algorithms to implement them."
2020	Sourav Chatterjee	Stanford University	Awarded "for his groundbreaking work in probability and statistical physics."
2021	Neeraj Kayal	Microsoft Research	Awarded for "his outstanding contributions to Computational Complexity."
2022	Mahesh Kakde	Indian Institute of Science	Awarded for "his outstanding contributions to algebraic number theory."
2023	Bhargav Bhatt	University of Michigan	Awarded for "his outstanding contributions to arithmetic geometry and commutative algebra.".
2024	Neena Gupta	Indian Statistical Institute	Awarded "for big impact of her work on the closely related fields of commutative algebra and algebraic geometry."
2025	Sabyasachi Mukherjee	Tata Institute of Fundamental Research, Mumbai	Awarded "for his powerful and original work that links two distinct areas of mathematics—the dynamics of Kleinian group actions and the iteration of holomorphic and anti-holomorphic maps in complex dynamics. His results have reshaped our understanding of conformal dynamics, an area of study that has important implications across physics, fluid dynamics, and even data science."

== Laureates in Physical Sciences ==
The Infosys Prize in Physical Sciences has been awarded annually since 2009.

Year	Laureate(s)	Institution(s)	Citation
2009	Thanu Padmanabhan	Inter-University Centre for Astronomy and Astrophysics	Awarded "for his contribution to a deeper understanding of Albert Einstein's theory of gravity in the context of thermodynamics, and for his work on the large scale structure in cosmology."
2010	Sandip Trivedi	Tata Institute of Fundamental Research	Awarded "for finding an ingenious way to solve two of the most outstanding puzzles of Superstring Theory simultaneously: What is the origin of dark energy of the Universe? Why is there no massless scalar particle?"
2011	Sriram Ramaswamy	Indian Institute of Science	Awarded "for his research on various aspects of the collective behaviour of living systems ranging from bacteria to schools of fish in the ocean."
2012	Ayyappanpillai Ajayagosh	National Institute for Interdisciplinary Science and Technology	Awarded "for his pioneering development of methods for the construction of supramolecular functional materials, which can be employed as components in organic electronic devices and in powerful substance selective optical sensing and imaging."
2013	Shiraz Minwalla	Institute for Advanced Study and Tata Institute of Fundamental Research	Awarded "for his pioneering contributions to the study of string theory, quantum field theory and gravity, and for uncovering a deep connection between the equations of fluid and superfluid dynamics and Einstein's equations of general relativity."
2014	Srivari Chandrasekhar	Indian Institute of Chemical Technology	Awarded "for his diverse and notable contributions in synthetic organic chemistry with special focus on the synthesis of complex molecules from natural sources. He has devised innovative, practical approaches to pharmaceuticals of current interest to industry."
2015	G. Ravindra Kumar	Tata Institute of Fundamental Research	Awarded "for his pioneering experimental contributions to the physics of high intensity laser matter interactions. In particular for providing, for the first time, unequivocal evidence of turbulent magnetic fields and the discovery of terahertz frequency acoustic waves, in laser produced hot dense plasmas. These results have significance to testing stellar and astrophysical scenarios."
2016	Anil Bhardwaj	Physical Research Laboratory	Awarded "for his experiments on Chandrayaan-1 and Mars Orbiter missions that revealed new features of solar wind interactions with lunar surface and provided important clues for understanding thermal escape of the Martian atmosphere. He also made very significant contributions in detection and delineation of the nature and origin of planetary X-rays."
2017	Yamuna Krishnan	University of Chicago	Awarded "for her ground-breaking work in the emerging field of architecture of the building blocks of life—the DNA. By successfully manipulating DNA to create biocompatible nanomachines she has created novel ways of interrogating living systems, increasing our knowledge of cell function and getting one step closer to answering unresolved biomedical questions."
2018	S. K. Satheesh	Indian Institute of Science	Awarded "for his pioneering scientific work in the field of climate change. His studies on black carbon aerosols, the dark, light absorbing, microscopic particles in air which greatly influence the energy balance of the atmosphere over the Indian subcontinent, have enabled a better understanding of the role of these particles on climate change, precipitation, and, human health in the Indian subcontinent."
2019	Govindasamy Mugesh	Indian Institute of Science	Awarded "for his seminal work in the chemical synthesis of small molecules and nanomaterials for biomedical applications."
2020	Arindam Ghosh	Indian Institute of Science	Awarded "for his development of atomically thin two-dimensional semiconductors to build a new generation of functional electronic, thermoelectric and optoelectronic devices."
2021	Bedangadas Mohanty	National Institute of Science Education and Research	Awarded for "investigations of the nuclear force."
2022	Nissim Kanekar	National Centre for Radio Astrophysics	Awarded "for his study of galaxies in an era, the so-called “high noon” period, in which stars were being formed at a maximum rate."
2023	Mukund Thattai	National Centre for Biological Sciences	Awarded "for his groundbreaking contributions to evolutionary cell biology."
2024	Vedika Khemani	Stanford University	Awarded "for her wide ranging and groundbreaking contributions to theoretical and experimental non-equilibrium quantum matter, most notably the discovery of time-crystals."
2025	Karthish Manthiram	California Institute of Technology	Awarded "for his pioneering work on sustainable electrochemical routes to essential chemicals. His breakthroughs in lithium-mediated ammonia synthesis and oxygen-atom transfer catalysis have transformed our understanding of electrified chemical manufacturing, demonstrating how renewable electricity can drive selective, efficient synthesis of chemicals that are fundamental to agriculture and industry."

== Laureates in Social Sciences ==
The Infosys Prize in Social Sciences has been awarded annually since 2009.

Year	Laureate(s)	Institution(s)	Citation
2009	Abhijit Banerjee	Massachusetts Institute of Technology	Awarded "for his contributions to the economic theory of development, and for his pioneering work in the empirical evaluation of public policy."
2009	Upinder Singh	University of Delhi	Awarded "for her contributions as a historian of ancient and early medieval Indian history."
2010	Nandini Sundar	Delhi School of Economics	Awarded "in recognition of her contributions as an outstanding analyst of social identities, including tribe and caste, and the politics of knowledge in modern India."
2010	Amita Baviskar	Institute of Economic Growth	Awarded "in recognition of her contributions as an outstanding analyst of social and environmental movements in modern India."
2011	Raghuram Govind Rajan	University of Chicago	Awarded "for his analysis of the complex interaction between financial institutions, governments and people."
2011	Pratap Bhanu Mehta	Center for Policy Research	Awarded "for broadening public discussion of important social, political and economic matters, bringing in heterodox perspectives and for constantly challenging reigning orthodoxies."
2012	Arunava Sen	Indian Statistical Institute	Awarded "for his game-theoretic analyses of mechanism design for implementing social choice rules, when individuals have diverse information and incentives."
2013	Aninhalli R. Vasavi	Nehru Memorial Museum & Library	Awarded "for her distinctive and pioneering research that spans a remarkable range covering four main areas: Agrarian society at the intersection of economy, culture and environment; school education in varied regional contexts; globalization and its impact on the moral economy of urban occupations; and social science as seen from the vantage point of Indian languages and regional cultures."
2014	Esther Duflo	Massachusetts Institute of Technology	Awarded "in recognition of her pioneering and prodigious contributions to development economics, with important implications for policies pertaining to the delivery of services to the poor."
2015	Srinath Raghavan	Center for Policy Research	Awarded "for outstanding research that synthesizes military history, international politics, and strategic analysis into powerful and imaginative perspectives on India in global context."
2016	Kaivan Munshi	University of Cambridge	Awarded "in recognition of his remarkably deep analysis of the multifaceted role of communities, such as ethnic groups and castes, in the process of economic development."
2017	Lawrence Liang	Ambedkar University	Awarded "for his creative scholarship on law and society. His prodigious output in the fields of copyright law, digital technologies and media, and popular culture consistently raises probing questions about the nature of freedom, rights, and social development. His provocative answers link historical context and ethical practice in unexpected and illuminating ways."
2018	Sendhil Mullainathan	The University of Chicago Booth School of Business	Awarded "for his path-breaking work in behavioral economics. Mullainathan's research has had substantial impact on diverse fields such as development, public finance, corporate governance and policy design. A significant part of this work is relevant to India. He is currently working on big data and machine learning issues and applications in economics."
2019	Anand Pandian	Johns Hopkins University	Awarded "for his brilliantly imaginative work on ethics, selfhood and the creative process."
2020	Raj Chetty	Harvard University	Awarded "for his pioneering research on identifying barriers to economic opportunity and for developing solutions to help people escape from poverty towards better life outcomes."
2021	Pratiksha Baxi	Jawaharlal Nehru University, India	Awarded for her "pioneering work on sexual violence and jurisprudence."
2022	Rohini Pande	Yale University	Awarded for her "outstanding research on subjects of key importance, including governance and accountability, women’s empowerment, the role of credit in the lives of the poor, and the environment. Her empirical findings, based on diverse methodologies, offer major promise and potential for policy design in emerging economies, including India."
2023	Karuna Mantena	Columbia University	Awarded for her "groundbreaking research on the theory of imperial rule, and the claim that this late imperial ideology became one of the important factors in the emergence of modern social theory. "
2024	Arun Chandrasekhar	Stanford University	Awarded for his "contribution to the study of social and economic networks, using innovative data sets and drawing on theoretical methods from machine learning and computer science. His collection and mapping of networks data, from multiple villages in Karnataka, provides a testbed for studying important questions in development economics."
2025	Nikhil Agarwal	Massachusetts Institute of Technology	Awarded for his "pioneering contributions to market design, including the development and implementation of pathbreaking methodology for empirical studies of allocation mechanisms, including school choice, medical residency, and kidney exchanges. Much of economics assumes that the invisible hand of the market brings about prices where demand equals supply. While this is likely true for apples and oranges, this is not the way those needing kidneys find those willing to supply kidneys, or students seeking college admission find the college that will admit them. These matching problems are hugely important but inadequately understood. Agarwal’s work has transformed this rudimentary literature into one anchored in data, providing new insights into policy design."

== Trustees ==
- N. R. Narayana Murthy
- S. Gopalakrishnan
- K. Dinesh
- S. D. Shibulal
- T.V. Mohandas Pai
- Srinath Batni
- Nandan Nilekani

== Controversies ==
Lawrence Liang, a professor of law awarded the Infosys Prize, was found guilty by an internal university inquiry committee of sexually harassing a doctoral student on multiple occasions. Following the adverse finding, prominent activists, academics and gender rights groups issued a public statement on social media condemning Liang and criticising the award of the Infosys Prize to Liang.

== See also ==
- List of Infosys Prize laureates
- List of chemistry awards
- List of engineering awards
- List of mathematics awards
- List of physics awards
- List of social sciences awards
