= List of Infosys Prize recipients =

The Infosys Prize is an annual award given to scientists, researchers, engineers and social scientists of Indian origin (not necessarily born in India) by the Infosys Science Foundation and ranks among the highest monetary awards in India to recognize research.

Year	Mathematical Sciences	Life Sciences	Physical Sciences	Social Sciences	Engineering and Computer Science
2008	Manindra Agrawal	-	-	-	-
2009	Ashoke Sen	Krishnaswamy VijayRaghavan	Thanu Padmanabhan	Economics - Abhijit Banerjee History - Upinder Singh	-
2010	Chandrashekhar Khare	Chetan Eknath Chitnis	Sandip Trivedi	Social Anthropology - Nandini Sundar Sociology - Amita Baviskar	Ashutosh Sharma
2011	Kannan Soundararajan	Imran Siddiqi	Sriram Ramaswamy	Economics - Raghuram G. Rajan Political Science and International Relations - Pratap Bhanu Mehta	Kalyanmoy Deb
2012	Manjul Bhargava	Satyajit Mayor	Ayyappanpillai Ajayagosh	Contemporary Literature - Amit Chaudhuri History - Sanjay Subrahmanyam	Ashish Lele
