= Amita Baviskar =

Indian Academic

Amita Baviskar is a sociologist and Professor of Environmental Studies and Sociology & Anthropology at Ashoka University, India. Previously, she was Professor at the Sociology Unit, Institute of Economic Growth, Delhi, India. She received the 2005 Malcolm Adiseshiah Award for Distinguished Contributions to Development Studies, the 2008 VKRV Rao Prize for Social Science Research and, in 2010, was awarded the Infosys Prize for Social Sciences – Sociology in recognition of her analysis of social and environmental movements in modern India. Baviskar studies the cultural politics of environment and development in rural and urban India.

== Education ==
Baviskar completed a BA in economics from the University of Delhi in 1986, MA in sociology from the Delhi School of Economics, University of Delhi in 1988, and PhD in Development Sociology from Cornell University in 1992.

== Academic career ==
Baviskar has taught at the Department of Sociology, Delhi School of Economics University of Delhi, as a lecturer and reader, between 1994 and 2003, and at the Sociology Unit, Institute of Economic Growth as an associate professor between 2006 and 2016, and as Professor since 2016. Since 2020, she has been the Head of Department for Environmental Studies at Ashoka University, Delhi.

Baviskar has been a visiting scholar at Stanford University, Cornell University, Yale University, SciencesPo and the University of California at Berkeley. She has also been a visiting fellow at the University of Cape Town, University of Michigan, Ann Arbor and the Oxford India Centre for Sustainable Development, Somerville College, University of Oxford.

Baviskar is a member of the Editorial Collective of the Journal of Peasant Studies, and the Editorial Team of the Review of Urban Studies, Economic and Political Weekly. She serves on the boards of several academic journals and institutions. During 2010–12, she was a member of the Forest Advisory Committee of the Ministry of Environment and Forests, Government of India. She also served on the Social Sciences jury for the Infosys Prize in 2017 and 2019.

== Selected publications ==
- Baviskar, Amita (2021). 'Street food and the art of survival: migrants and places in Delhi, India' in Food, Culture & Society: An International Journal of Multidisciplinary Research. 24 (1).
- Baviskar, Amita (2020). "Uncivil City: Ecology, Equity And The Commons In Delhi". Delhi: Sage Publications
- Baviskar, Amita (2018). 'Consumer Citizenship: Instant Noodles in India' in Gastronomica: The Journal of Critical Food Studies. 18 (2): 1–10.
- Baviskar, Amita (2018). 'Urban Jungles: Wilderness, Parks and their Publics in Delhi' in Economic and Political Weekly. 53 (2): 46–54.
- Baviskar, Amita (2017). What the Eye Does Not See: The Yamuna in the Imagination of Delhi. In Hall, Suzanne; Burdett, Ricky eds. (2017). The Sage Handbook of the 21st Century City. pp. 298–313. London: Sage Publications (reprint).
- Baviskar, Amita (2016). First Garden of the Republic: Nature on the President's Estate. New Delhi: Publications Division, Government of India.
- Baviskar, Amita; Ray, Raka (2011). Elite and Everyman: The Cultural Politics of the Indian Middle Classes. New Delhi: Routledge.
- Baviskar, Amita ed. (2008). Contested Grounds: Essays on Nature, Culture and Power. New Delhi: Oxford University Press.
- Baviskar, Amita (2007). Waterscapes: The Cultural Politics of a Natural Resource. New Delhi: Permanent Black.
- Shah, Ghanshyam; Mander, Harsh; Thorat, Sukhadeo; Baviskar, Amita; Deshpande, Satish (2006). Untouchability in Rural India. New Delhi: Sage Publications.
- Baviskar, Amita (2004). In the Belly of River: Tribal Conflicts over Development in the Narmada Valley. second ed. Delhi: Oxford University Press.
- Baviskar, Amita ed. (2003). Waterlines: The Penguin Book of River Writings. New Delhi: Penguin Books. ISBN 9780143030386.
- Baviskar, Amita (1995). In the Belly of the River: Tribal Conflicts over Development in the Narmada Valley. Delhi: Oxford University Press. ISBN 9780195671360.
