= Srivari Chandrasekhar =

Indian scientist (born 1964)

- Born: 9 March 1964 (age 62)
- Education: PhD Organic Chemistry, Osmania University
- Awards: CSIR Technology Award (2021), Infosys Prize (2014), CNR Rao National Prize for Chemical Research (2012), Infosys Prize (2014)
- Scientific career
- Fields: Chemist
- Workplaces: Gandhi Institute of Technology and Management (GITAM)

Srivari Chandrasekhar (born 9 March 1964) is an Indian scientist working in the area of Synthetic Organic Chemistry. He is currently serving as an advisor to PI Industries, and a distinguished professor at Gandhi Institute of Technology and Management (GITAM), and was previously the director of CSIR-Indian Institute of Chemical Technology, (Council of Scientific and Industrial Research) Ministry of Science & Technology, Government of India and former Secretary of the Ministry of Science and Technology, under the Ministry of Science and Technology (India).

Known for his contribution to various areas of chemistry, synthesis of pharmaceutical products and other biologically active natural products, Chandrasekhar is a fellow of all the three Indian Science academies, i.e., Indian Academy of Sciences, National Academy of Sciences, and Indian National Science Academy.

In 2014, Chandrasekhar won the Infosys Prize in Physical Sciences for his contributions to synthetic organic chemistry with special focus on the synthesis of complex molecules from natural sources.

== Early life and education ==
Born on 9 March 1964, Srivari Chandrasekhar did his bachelor's degree in science in 1982 and master's degree in science with a major in organic chemistry in 1985 from Osmania University. Subsequently, he enrolled for doctoral studies at IICT (awarded by Osmania University) and secured a Ph.D. degree in 1991. His post-doctoral studies were at the University of Texas Southwestern Medical Centre, Dallas, USA, and the University of Goettingen, Germany as Alexander von Humboldt Fellow.

He joined CSIR-IICT as a scientist in 1994 and became director in 2015. Later, he was appointed as the director of the DST in 2021, took charge of the DST on 13 December 2021. He served until 10 July 2023. During his tenure as a Secretary at DST, he led some of the major projects, including India's National Quantum Mission, aimed at developing quantum computing capabilities in laboratories and companies across India. And ANRF

== Research ==
Chandrasekhar's research focuses on the synthesis of organic compounds, biologically active natural products, especially of marine origin, and the development of ecologically viable green technologies useful for industrial applications in the pharmaceutical sector. His research led to the use of polyethylene glycol (PEG) as a Green Chemistry solution, synthesis of scarcely available natural products with important biological activity, and new molecular entities for affordable healthcare. For instance, he developed technologies for the synthesis of bedaquiline (an anti-tuberculosis drug), misoprostol (an anti-tumor drug that helps treat stomach ulcers), asenapine (drug for the treatment of schizophrenia), sertraline (antidepressant compound), and other drugs at a lower cost to make them affordable.

== Awards ==
Among the awards he has received for his research are:

- CSIR Technology Award (2014, 2020 and 2021)
- Eminent Scientist Award in the field of chemistry from Telangana State Government (2017)
- Listed in The Asian Scientist 100, the honor is bestowed by the English language science and technology magazine Asian Scientist (2016)
- Infosys Prize (2014)
- CNR Rao National Prize for Chemical Research (2012)
- Ranbaxy Research Award (2010)
- NASI-Reliance Industries Platinum Jubilee Award (2008)
