= Srinath Raghavan =

Indian historian of contemporary history (born 1977)

- Born: 1977 (age 48–49)
- Occupations: Senior Fellow, Centre for Policy Research
- Awards: Infosys Prize

Academic background
- Education: University of Madras; King's College London
- Doctoral advisor: Lawrence Freedman

Academic work
- Discipline: Military history and Security studies
- Notable works: War and Peace in Modern India; 1971: A Global History; India's War: The Making of Modern South Asia; The Most Dangerous Place

Srinath Raghavan is an Indian historian of contemporary history. He is a professor of history and international relations at Ashoka University, a senior fellow at the Carnegie Endowment for International Peace, and a visiting senior research fellow at the India Institute of King's College London. He was previously a senior fellow at the Centre for Policy Research, specialising in contemporary and historical aspects of India's foreign and security policies.

Raghavan has written and edited several books about India's strategic history, and has been a regular commentator on foreign and strategic affairs. He is a recipient of the K. Subrahmanyam Award for Strategic Studies (2011) and the Infosys Prize for Social Sciences (2015).

== Life ==
Srinath Raghavan was born in 1977. He studied in Hyderabad, Kolkata and Chennai, graduating with a bachelor's degree in physics from the University of Madras in 1997.

Raghavan joined the Indian Army in 1997 as a commissioned officer in the infantry. He served for six years in the Rajputana Rifles, in Sikkim, Rajasthan and Jammu and Kashmir.

He entered academia in 2003, studying at King's College London on an Inlaks scholarship. He worked with Lawrence Freedman, Professor of War Studies at King's College, receiving an MA and PhD in War Studies. His Ph.D. dissertation was the basis of his first book, War and Peace in Modern India.

Afterwards, Raghavan taught as a lecturer in Defence studies at King's College for three years. As of 2015 he worked at the Carnegie India, a policy think tank in New Delhi.

Raghavan published three works on the strategic history of India between 2010 and 2016 and was working on further books. In 2015, Raghavan was chosen by India's Ministry of Defence to head a team of historians working on the official history of the Kargil War. The project was to last two years. He has served as a member of the National Security Advisory Board formed by the Indian Prime Minister.

== Books ==
=== War and Peace in Modern India: A Strategic History of the Nehru Years ===
His first book, it covered the strategic history of Jawaharlal Nehru's premiership and was published as part of The Indian Century Series edited by scholars Ramachandra Guha and Sunil Khilnani. The editors stated in the book's preface that Raghavan has set a "benchmark" for the historical study of the strategic and foreign policy issues of India. He has covered the strategic crises faced by India in the first fifteen years of its independent existence, using a range of sources and analytical depth.

Scholar Kristina Roepstorff, in a book review, said that the book illuminated the rationale behind the strategic choices made by Nehru in facing major dilemmas during his tenure, and was a good and relevant account of the events that shaped Nehru's strategic thinking and his approach to crisis management. However, she found the book to be short on "theoretical reflection", and noted that the book covered a selection of case studies mainly dealing with India's princely states and crises with neighbours, but omitted general international issues such as the crises dealing with Goa or Congo. She felt that further justification of the selection of cases was necessary to avert selection bias in drawing general conclusions.

Shashank Joshi called the book a "commanding diplomatic history" of the Nehru years. Odd Arne Westad called it "international history at its very best". Scholar Jivanta Schottli called it "polished historical study", and Rudra Chaudhuri said it should be considered "the single most important text on Indian strategic history". Priya Chacko noted that it is meticulously researched and draws on previously untapped archival sources, such as the private papers of British officials, allowing Raghavan to circumvent the usual limitations of diplomatic history.

Historian Perry Anderson finds that Srinath Raghavan is a firm apologist for India and describes his book as a hymn to Nehru's strategism.

=== 1971: A Global History of the Creation of Bangladesh ===
Published in 2013, this book locates the creation of Bangladesh within the wider geopolitical currents of the Cold War, moving beyond the traditional bilateral narrative of an India-Pakistan conflict. Raghavan argues that the breakup of Pakistan was not inevitable, but rather the result of a specific conjuncture of global events, utilizing archival material to demonstrate how the crisis was shaped by the strategic calculations of great powers.

In a review for the Literary Review, David Gilmour praised the work for its prodigious research and for dismantling the retrospective determinism often applied to the conflict. He noted that Raghavan successfully argues that the emergence of Bangladesh was a product of "conjuncture and contingency," though he observed that the book concentrates more on the diplomatic dimension than the military one. David Carter, writing in Asian Affairs, compared the work to Gary J. Bass's The Blood Telegram, noting that both texts are essential for understanding the complex international matrix of the crisis. Manoj Joshi, in The Hindu, highlighted the book's focus on global politics, while other scholars have debated the balance between the book's global focus and the local tragedy.

=== India's War: The Making of Modern South Asia, 1939–1945 ===
In this 2016 work, Raghavan argues that the Second World War was not merely a backdrop to the Indian freedom struggle but a constitutive event that fundamentally shaped modern South Asia. The book details how the war transformed the British Raj into a garrison state and posits that the strategic capabilities developed during the war laid the institutional foundations for independent India's emergence as a major Asian power.

John Keay, reviewing for the Literary Review, called it a "minutely detailed study" of the conflict from the Indian perspective. A review in The Independent noted the book's significance in showing that India was "more than a bastion of the British Empire," while The Spectator praised the work for its detailed account of the making of modern India. The Financial Times also reviewed the book, acknowledging its contribution to the history of the period.

=== The Most Dangerous Place: A History of the United States in South Asia ===
Published in 2018, this book offers a long-durée history of American involvement in the Indian subcontinent. The title is derived from a comment by President Bill Clinton in 2000 regarding Kashmir. Raghavan challenges the notion that the United States has been a peripheral player in the region, arguing instead that it has been deeply enmeshed in South Asia's political and economic fabric for over two centuries.

Suhasini Haidar, in The Hindu, described the book as a "tangled" history of the relationship, while Jyoti Malhotra in ThePrint called it an "absorbing read" that goes beyond its title. Other reviews appeared in The Indian Express and The Telegraph, discussing the book's fresh perspective on the American role in the region.
