= Aninhalli Vasavi =

Indian anthropologist

Prof. Aninhalli R. Vasavi
- Born: 20 December 1958 (age 67); Chikmagalur, India
- Education: Michigan State University USA
- Occupations: Member, Punarchith Collective, Chamarajanagar
- Awards: Thoman Fellowship, American Institute of Indian Studies; Infosys Prize (2013)

Prof. Aninhalli R. Vasavi, also known as A.R.Vasavi, is a Social Anthropologist and an Independent Researcher-based out of Bengaluru, with interests in agrarian studies, sociology of India and educational studies. She did her M.A. and M.Phil. in Sociology from the University of Delhi, and her PhD in Social Anthropology from Michigan State University in 1993, with a thesis "The harbingers of rain : culture and drought in Bijapur, India." She has worked at the Indian Institute of Management ̶ Ahmedabad, and for 14 years at National Institute of Advanced Studies (NIAS), Bengaluru, including a year as Dean of Social Sciences.

== Biography ==
She holds a B.A. (Sociology); Stella Maris College, Chennai. M.A. and MPhil from the Dept of Sociology, Delhi School of Economics, University of Delhi. PhD in Social Anthropology from Michigan State University, USA. She has worked from 1997 to 2011 as Faculty at National Institute of Advanced Studies, Bangalore, and had also been Adjunct Faculty at Indian Institute of Management Kozhikode, Kerala, and visiting professor, Tufts University, Massachusetts, USA. 1992–93.

She is currently with Punarchith Collective, an alternative learning place for rural youth at Chamarajanagar, Karnataka.

Vasavi is a founder and active member of the Centre for Research and Education in Social Transformation [CREST], Kozhikode, Kerala, an institute that facilitates comprehensive learning for the scheduled castes and tribes. Her work appears in academic journals (Journal of the Royal Anthropological Institute, South African Review of Sociology, Contributions to Indian Sociology, and the Economic and Political Weekly) and in books authored (Harbingers of Rain; Shadow Space: Suicides and the predicament of rural India) or edited (In an outpost of the global economy, with Carol Upadhya; and Inner Mirror: Kannada writings on society and culture).

Vasavi left NIAS in 2011 to pursue her own research and to develop Punarchith, an organization for alternative learning she helped set up in Chamarajanagar district, Karnataka.

== Academic Work ==
Vasavi has four different areas of research. She has made seminal contributions towards an environmentally-aware ethnographic perspective on agrarian economy and culture (Harbingers of Rain, OUP 1999). Her book on farmers' suicides (Shadow Space: Suicides and the Predicament of Rural India, Three Essays Collective, 2012) demonstrates how the individualization and alienation produced by industrial farming methods generate unbearable social suffering that goes far beyond mere indebtedness or drought.

Her research on primary education offers an analysis of the cultural embeddedness of the school, the teacher and the child as simultaneously social and administrative entities. Her concept of 'school differentiation' appears in key reports written for international agencies and the governments of India, Karnataka and Rajasthan. She is a contributor to the ethnography and political economy of the IT profession in India (In an outpost of the global economy, Routledge, 2008, co-edited with Carol Upadhya). She is also the executive producer of a documentary trilogy on the IT industry in Bengaluru, Coding Culture (NIAS, 2006). She has facilitated a productive engagement between Kannada writers and westernized social science in Kannada (edited volumes: The Inner Mirror: Kannada Writings on Society and Culture, 2009; Kannada version: Volagannadi, 2011).

== Key Publications ==
Harbingers of Rain: Land and Life in South India (Oxford University Press, 1999), according to WorldCat, is held in 144 libraries; In an Outpost of the Global Economy (Co-edited with Carol Upadhya) (Routledge, 2008); Inner Mirror: Translation of Kannada Writings on Society and Culture (The Book Review Press, 2009), Volagannadi (Kannada Version) (Kannada University Press, 2011); Shadow Space: Suicides and the Predicament of Rural India (Three Essays Collective: 2012).
