= Sachchida Nand Tripathi =

Indian scientist (born 1971)

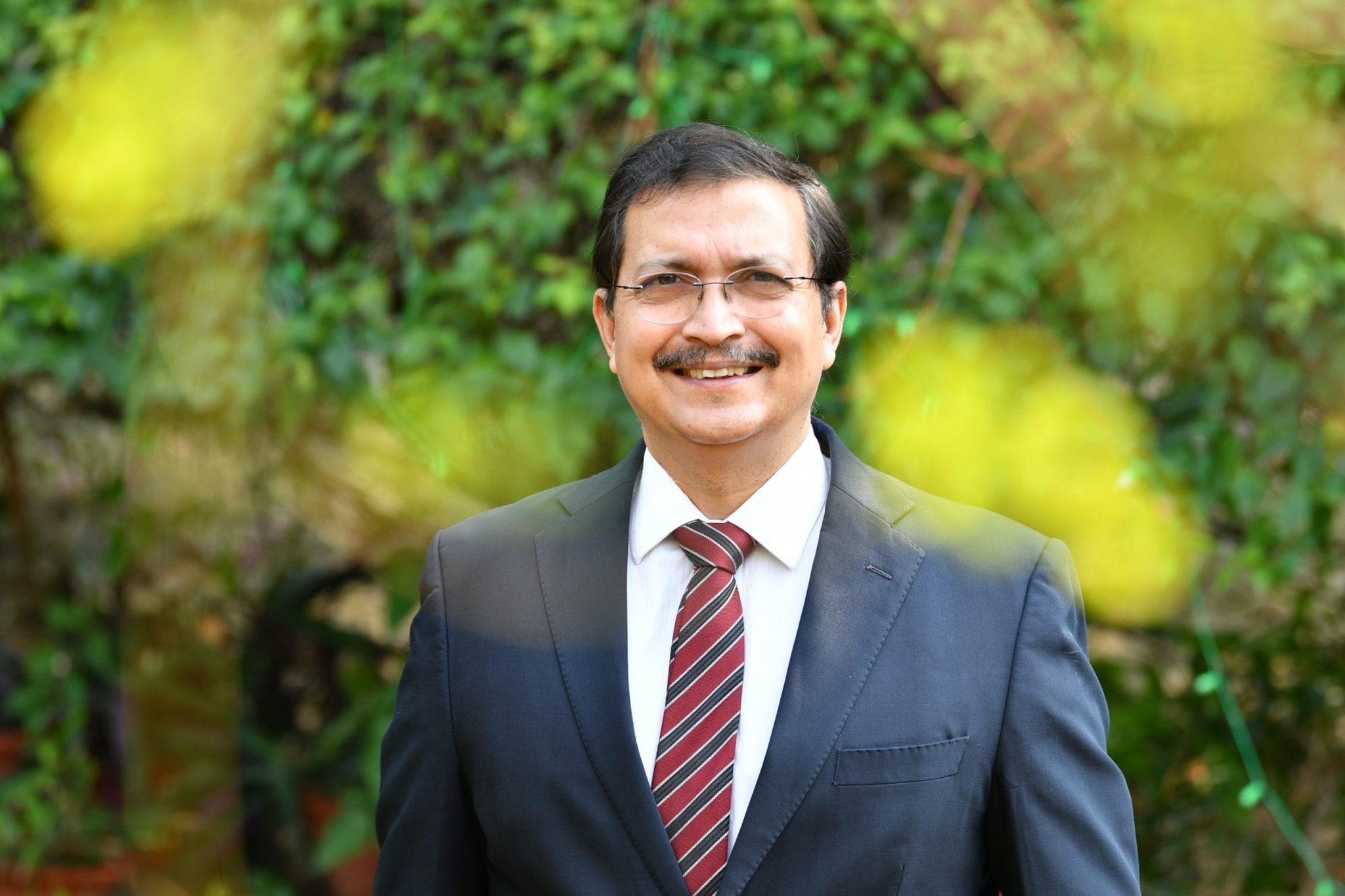
- Born: 24 July 1971 (age 55)
- Education: IIT (BHU) Varanasi (B.Tech.); NIT Allahabad (M.Tech.); University of Reading (Ph.D.)
- Known for: Air Quality, Climate Change
- Awards: Shanti Swarup Bhatnagar Prize in Earth, Atmosphere, Ocean and Planetary Sciences (2014); Distinguished Alumnus Award, Banaras Hindu University (2015); U.P. Ratna Award, Government of Uttar Pradesh (2018); Infosys Prize in Engineering and Computer Science (2023)
- Scientific career
- Fields: Atmospheric Sciences
- Workplaces: Indian Institute of Technology Kanpur

Sachchida Nand Tripathi (born 24 July 1971) is an Indian scientist specialising in atmospheric sciences. He serves as the Dean of the Kotak School of Sustainability and is a Professor in the Department of Civil Engineering and the Department of Sustainable Energy Engineering at the Indian Institute of Technology, Kanpur.

Tripathi was awarded the Shanti Swarup Bhatnagar Prize for Science and Technology in 2014 by the Council for Scientific and Industrial Research, Government of India, for his contributions to the field of Earth, Atmosphere, Ocean and Planetary Sciences. He is also a recipient of the J. C. Bose Fellowship from the Department of Science and Technology, Government of India, and the Infosys Prize 2023 in Engineering and Computer Science. The Infosys Prize recognised his work in deploying a large-scale, sensor-based air quality network and a mobile laboratory for hyperlocal pollution measurement, generating and analysing data using artificial intelligence and machine learning for effective air quality management and public awareness. He was also recognised for his discovery of new pathways of aerosol formation and growth, providing a mechanistic understanding of haze formation.

== Early life and education ==
Sachchida Nand Tripathi was born on 24 July 1971 in Varanasi, Uttar Pradesh. He obtained a B.Tech. degree from the Indian Institute of Technology (BHU) Varanasi in 1992, followed by an M.Tech. from the National Institute of Technology, Allahabad, in 1995. He completed his PhD at the University of Reading, United Kingdom, in 2000. He subsequently undertook post-doctoral research at the Bhabha Atomic Research Centre and the University of Oxford, before joining the Indian Institute of Technology Kanpur as a faculty member in 2003.

== Research and career ==
Prof. Sachchida Nand Tripathi specialises in aerosol science, adopting a comprehensive, science-driven approach to address critical environmental challenges. His research is interdisciplinary in nature, with a focus on the interconnections between air quality, public health, and the impacts of climate change.

His work on cloud condensation nuclei (CCN) and cloud microphysics, initiated in 2006, contributed to the conceptualisation and implementation of the Cloud-Aerosol Interactions and Precipitation Enhancement Experiment (CAIPEX), conducted under the Ministry of Earth Sciences.

Tripathi was among the first to explore the aerosol-induced cloud invigoration effect (AIvE) over the Indian summer monsoon region. He demonstrated aerosol indirect effects, highlighting the role of aerosol-cloud feedback through CCN during the Indian monsoon for the first time. He recently led a study published in Nature Communications, which provided evidence of widespread occurrence of AIvE across the Indian subcontinent, with significant implications for cloud structure, radiation budget, and monsoon rainfall patterns.

As the Principal Investigator of the aircraft campaign under the Continental Tropical Convergence Zone (CTCZ) experiment, led by the Department of Science and Technology, Tripathi investigated vertical and latitudinal variations in key aerosol properties during the early monsoon seasons of 2008 and 2009. His research group was the first to measure and report the three-dimensional variation of aerosol optical and hygroscopic characteristics over the CTCZ up to an altitude of 6 km. A key outcome of this effort was the first cloud condensation nuclei (CCN) closure analysis based on airborne observations in India.

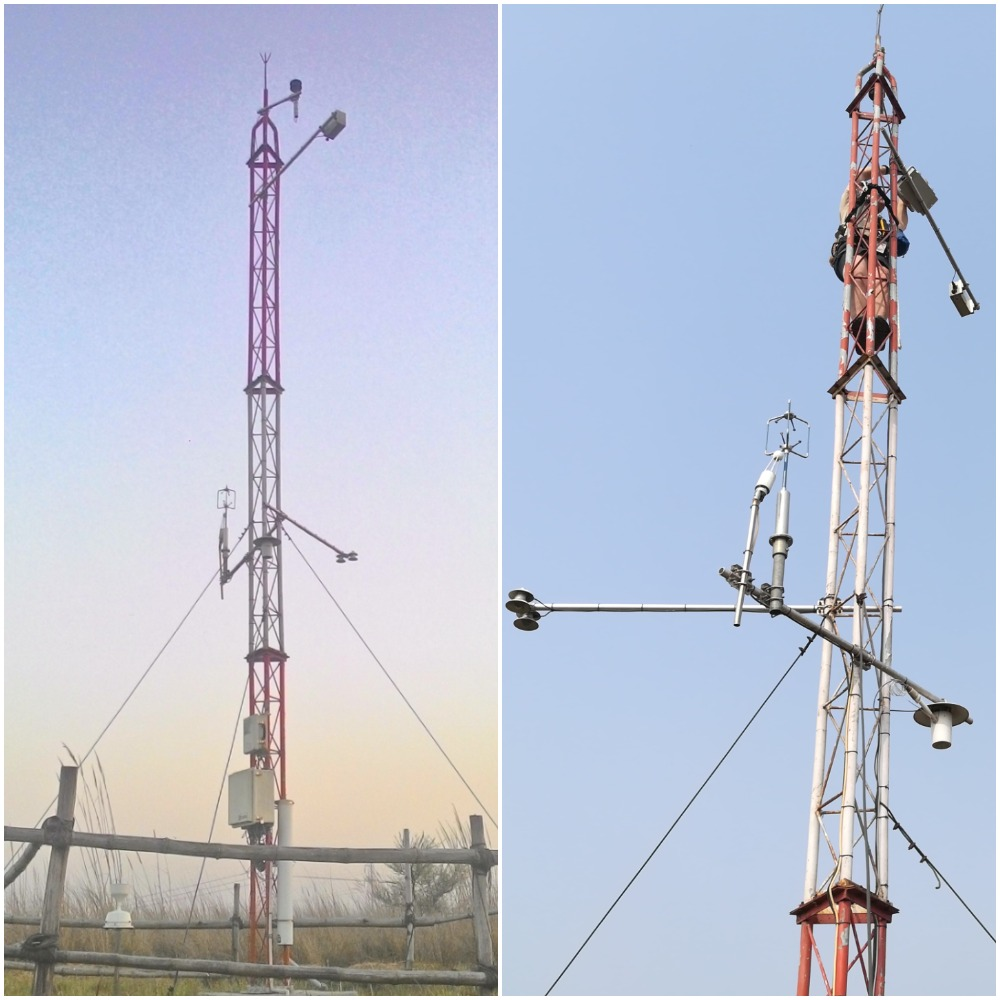
Flux tower at IIT Kanpur for measuring complete surface energy balance

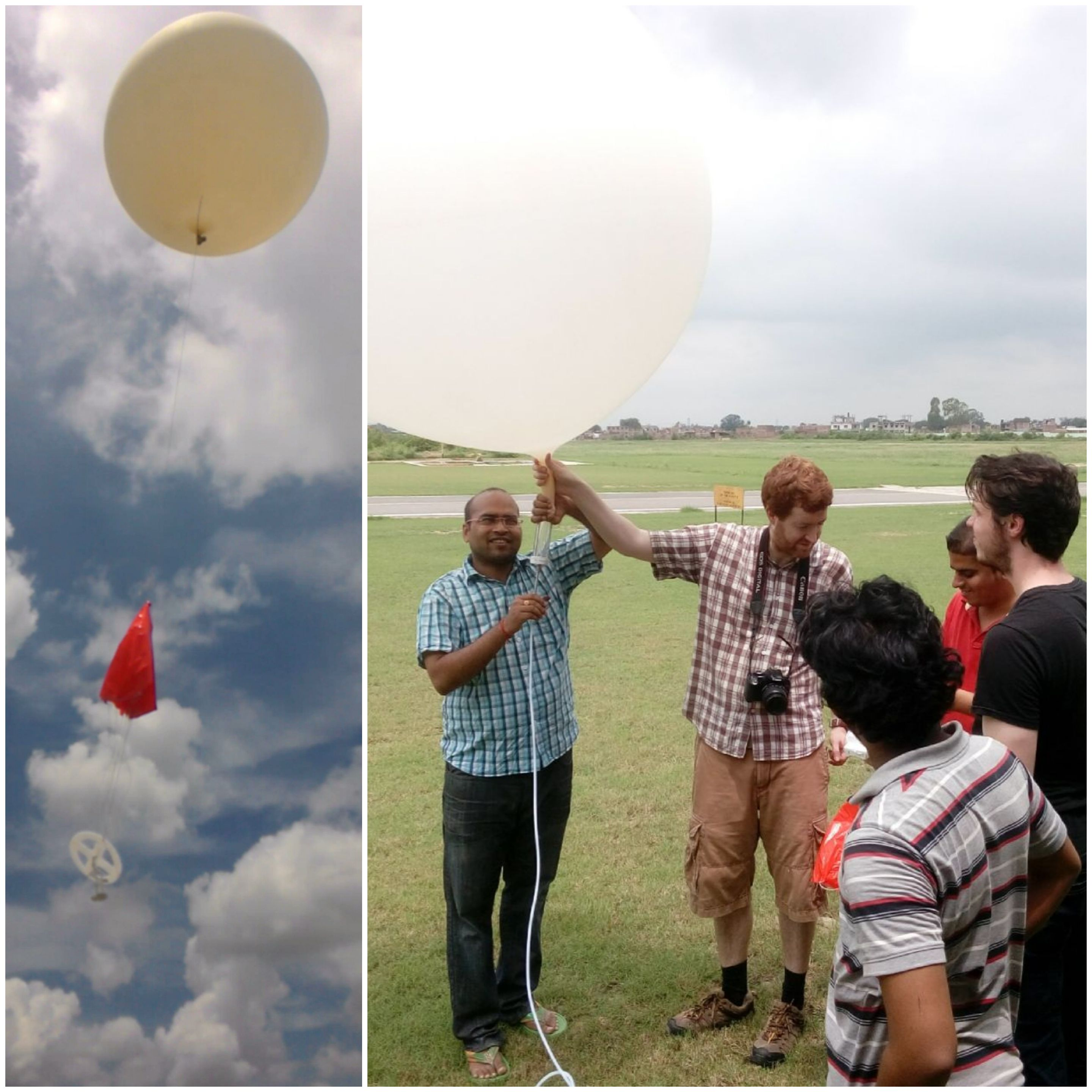
Radiosondes Launch

As co-Principal Investigator of the Interaction of Convective Organisation with Monsoon Precipitation, Atmosphere, Surface and Sea (INCOMPASS) field campaign, Kanpur served as a supersite during the 2016 field intensives. The Kanpur supersite successfully deployed advanced instruments including an eddy covariance flux tower, ceilometer, microwave radiometer, and radiosondes. These provided valuable data on surface energy balance, cloud properties, and atmospheric thermodynamics, contributing to improved monsoon rainfall predictions.

Tripathi's interdisciplinary approach is also reflected in his work on the discolouration of the Taj Mahal, where he helped identify the causal link between environmental pollutants and the degradation of the monument's surface. The study contributed to stronger enforcement measures and policy changes to protect the site.

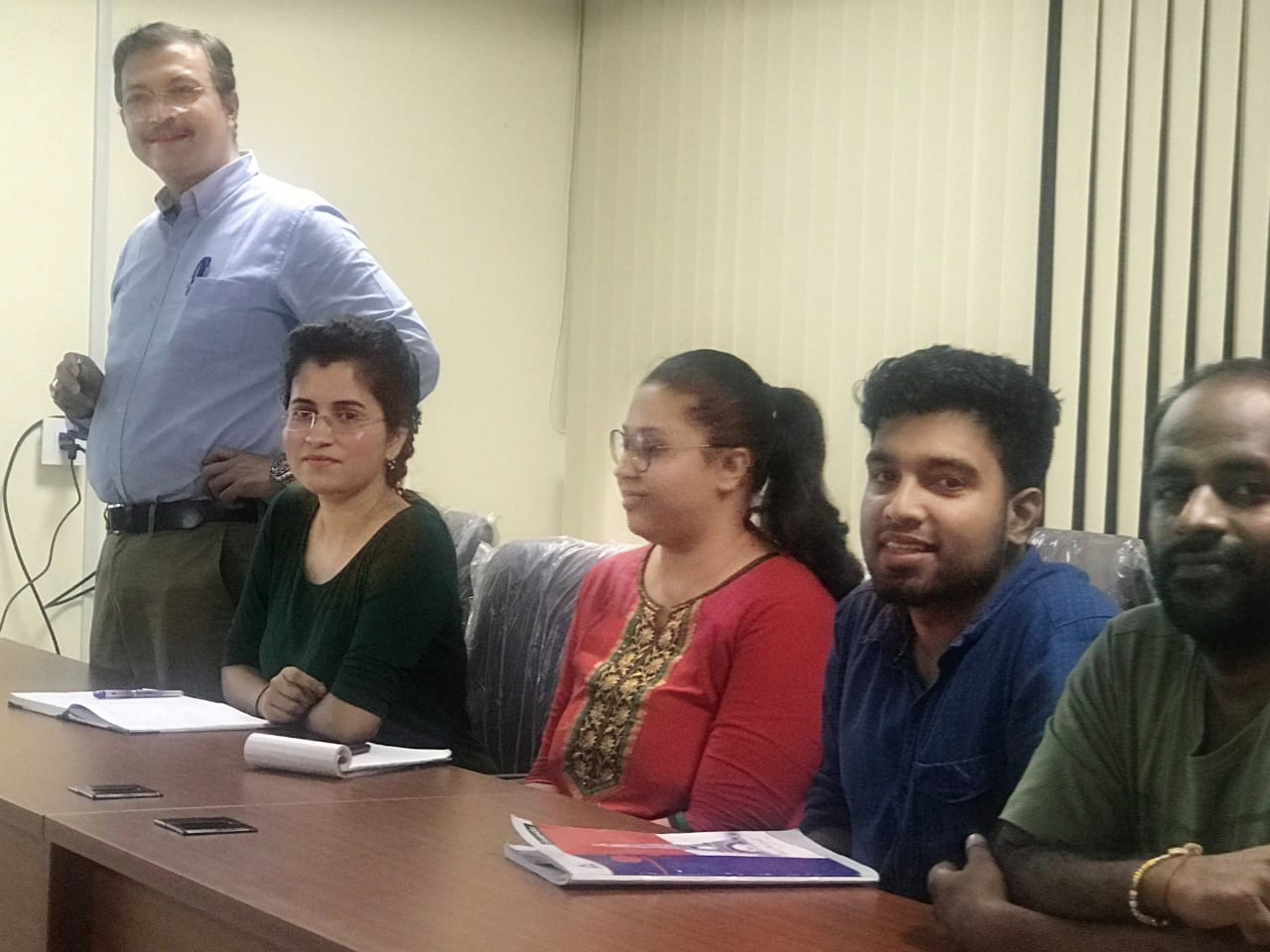
RTSA study discussion during the visit of Principal Scientific Adviser to GoI, 2019

Between 2014 and 2016, he co-authored two influential technical reports that laid the foundation for India's National Clean Air Programme (NCAP). He has also contributed to the development of indigenous low-cost air quality sensors. His group conducted the first long-term scientific evaluation of such sensors in India, and the results have been widely cited and used internationally.

Tripathi played a key role in the development and deployment of one of India's first scientifically validated, sensor-based air quality monitoring networks across multiple cities. He also pioneered the Real-Time Source Apportionment (RTSA) approach, which has been published in leading journals in environmental science and technology, establishing India's leadership in this area.

== Awards and recognition ==
- Asian Scientist 100, Asian Scientist, 2024
- Infosys Prize in Engineering and Computer Science, 2023
- Fellow, Institute of Advanced Sustainability Studies, Potsdam, Germany (2021–2022)
- J. C. Bose National Fellowship, awarded by the Science and Engineering Research Board (SERB), Department of Science and Technology (2021–2026)
- Arjun Dev Joneja Faculty Chair, Indian Institute of Technology Kanpur (2021–2024)
- Elected Fellow, Indian National Science Academy, 2020
- U.P. Ratna Award, Government of Uttar Pradesh, 2018
- Distinguished Alumnus Award, Banaras Hindu University, 2015
- Elected Fellow, The National Academy of Sciences, India, 2015
- Rajeeva and Sangeeta Lahri Chair Professor, Indian Institute of Technology Kanpur (2015–2018)
- Elected Fellow, Indian National Academy of Engineering, 2015
- Shanti Swarup Bhatnagar Prize in Earth, Atmosphere, Ocean and Planetary Sciences, 2014
- Sir M. Visvesvaraya Research Fellowship for excellence in teaching and research (2009–2012)
- NASA Senior Fellowship (2009–2010)
- NASI-SCOPUS Young Scientist Award for highest citations in Earth Sciences, 2009
- Young Teacher Career Award, All India Council for Technical Education, 2003

== Notable projects ==
=== Streaming Analytics over Temporal Variables for Air Quality Monitoring (SATVAM) ===
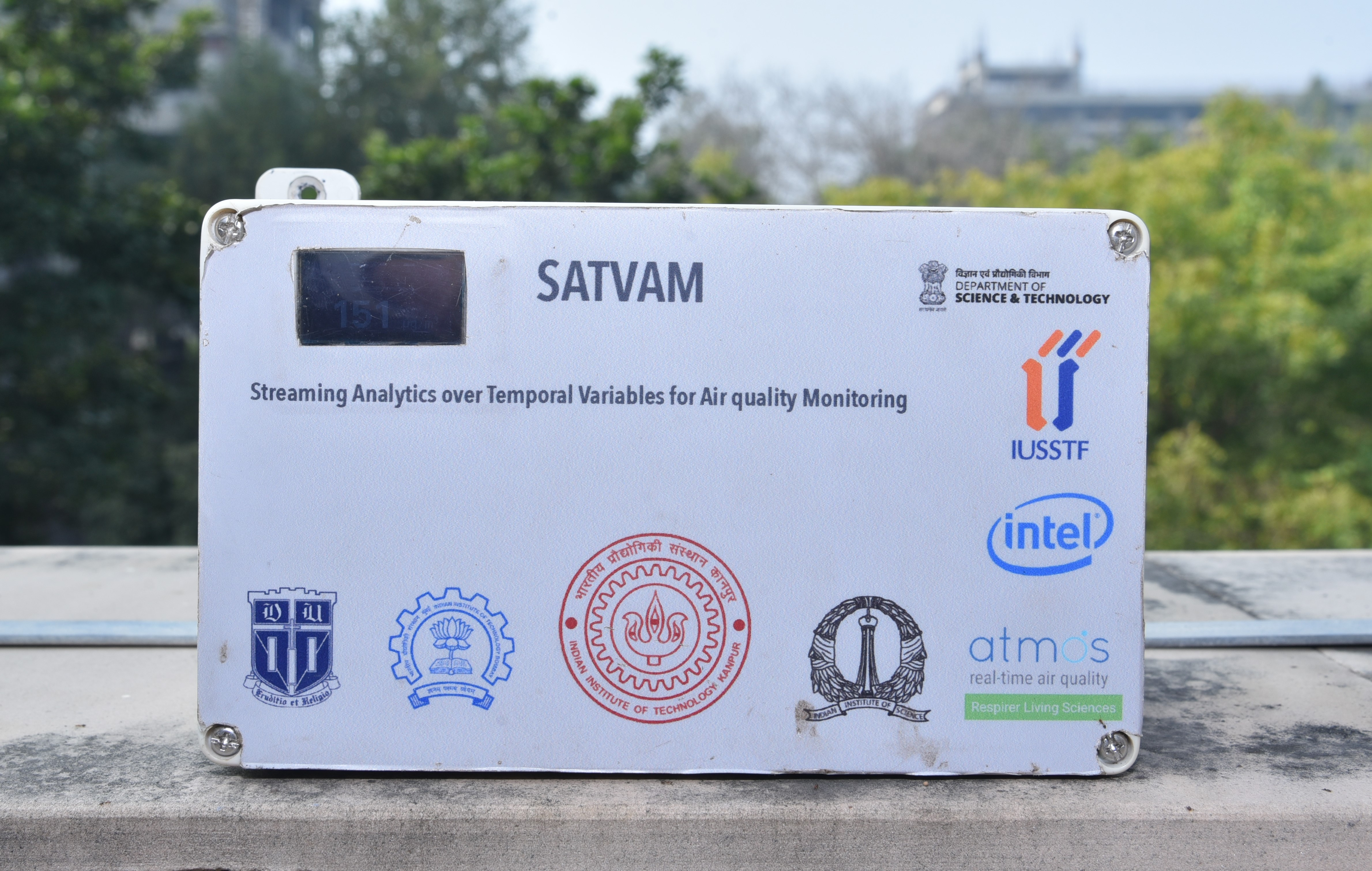
SATVAM real time low cost air quality monitor

Prof. Tripathi served as the Principal Investigator for a project titled SATVAM (Streaming Analytics over Temporal Variables for Air Quality Monitoring), supported by the Department of Science and Technology (DST) and Intel, and administered by the Indo-US Science and Technology Forum (IUSSTF). The project aimed to establish India's first scientifically certified and calibrated air quality monitoring network for pollutants such as PM_{2.5}, PM_{10}, NO_{x}, and ozone. The SATVAM team conducted extensive evaluations of low-cost air quality sensors across varied environmental conditions. The devices incorporated indigenously developed sensor interface circuit boards, low-power data communication technologies, renewable energy-based autonomous power supplies, real-time machine learning calibrations, and spatial-temporal analytics dashboards.

=== Low-Cost Air Quality Sensor Technology Assessment in Mumbai ===
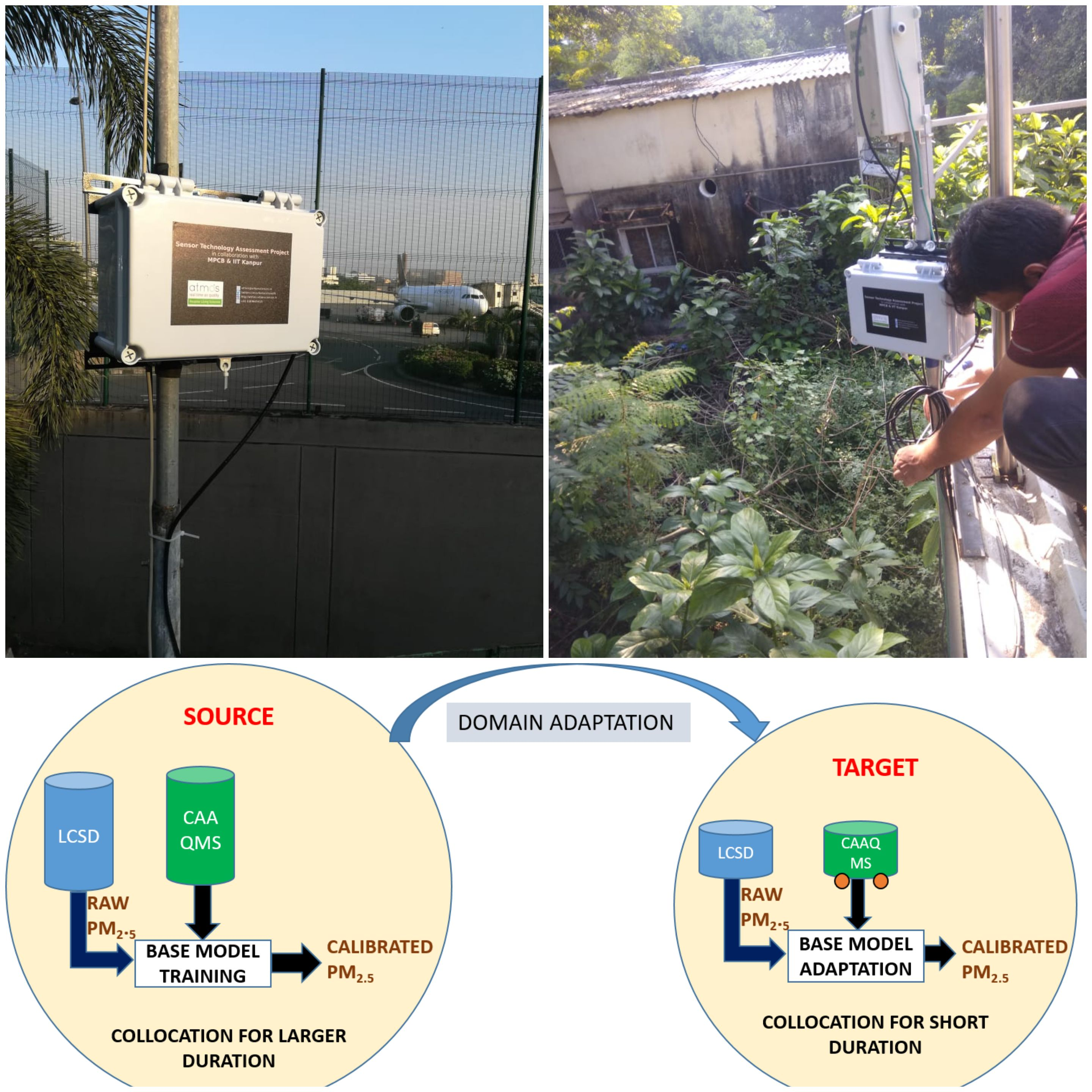
Sensor Technology Assessment Project with MPCB

Under a Sensor Technology Assessment Project in collaboration with the Maharashtra Pollution Control Board (MPCB), four start-ups deployed low-cost air quality sensors collocated with reference-grade monitors across the Mumbai Metropolitan Region. Initiated in November 2020, the project collected data from 15 locations over six months. Tripathi's team proposed a novel calibration method to minimise the co-location time required for particulate matter (PM) sensors when compared with reference-grade monitors.

=== Continental Tropical Convergence Zone (CTCZ) Aircraft Experiment ===
Prof. Tripathi led the first cloud-related experiment in India under the CTCZ Aircraft Experiment, funded by the Department of Science and Technology's Intensification of Research in High Priority Areas (IRHPA) programme and the Indian Space Research Organisation's Geosphere-Biosphere Programme (ISRO-GBP). The experiment was the first to measure the three-dimensional variation in aerosol optical, physical, and CCN (cloud condensation nuclei) properties during the pre-monsoon and monsoon seasons over the Indian Continental Tropical Convergence Zone.

=== INCOMPASS and TIGERZ Field Campaigns ===
Tripathi was co-Principal Investigator of the INCOMPASS (Interaction of Convective Organisation with Monsoon Precipitation, Atmosphere, Surface and Sea) project, a joint Indo-UK initiative under the Monsoon Mission. Conducted in 2016, INCOMPASS combined aircraft and ground-based observations to improve understanding of land-atmosphere interactions influencing monsoon genesis and progression. As Principal Investigator of the Kanpur supersite, he led the deployment of advanced monitoring instruments, contributing to improved monsoon prediction models.

He was also the Principal Investigator in the TIGERZ (Transport and Chemical Evolution over the Indo-Gangetic Plain during the Pre-Monsoon Season) international field campaign in 2008. Conducted in collaboration with NASA's Goddard Space Flight Center and Canadian partners, the campaign focused on the industrial city of Kanpur. Sun photometers from NASA's AERONET (Aerosol Robotic Network) provided high-frequency data to characterise pollution and dust in the Indo-Gangetic Plain, a region where complex aerosol mixtures and semi-reflective surfaces challenge satellite retrieval accuracy.

=== National Aerosol Facility (NAF) ===
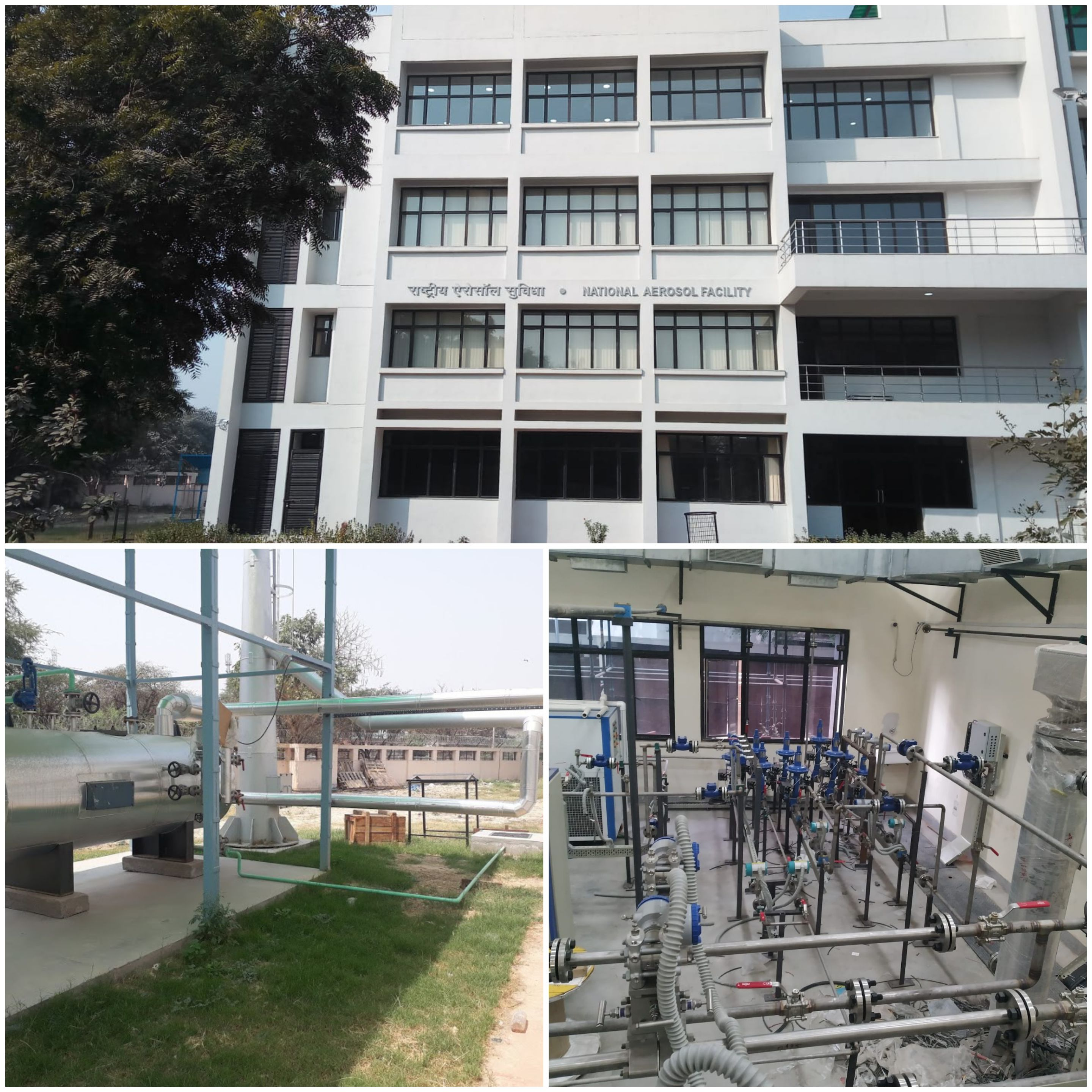
National Aerosol Facility at IIT Kanpur

Tripathi spearheaded the establishment of the National Aerosol Facility (NAF) at IIT Kanpur, in collaboration with the Board of Research in Nuclear Sciences (BRNS) and the Bhabha Atomic Research Centre (BARC), Department of Atomic Energy. The facility is dedicated to aerosol safety research specific to Indian Pressurised Heavy Water Reactors (PHWRs), setting it apart from international facilities that focus on Light Water Reactor systems. NAF includes experimental setups and theoretical modelling frameworks designed to investigate aerosol behaviour under accident scenarios. The facility positions India among the global leaders in nuclear safety research and supports the country's long-term energy security goals.

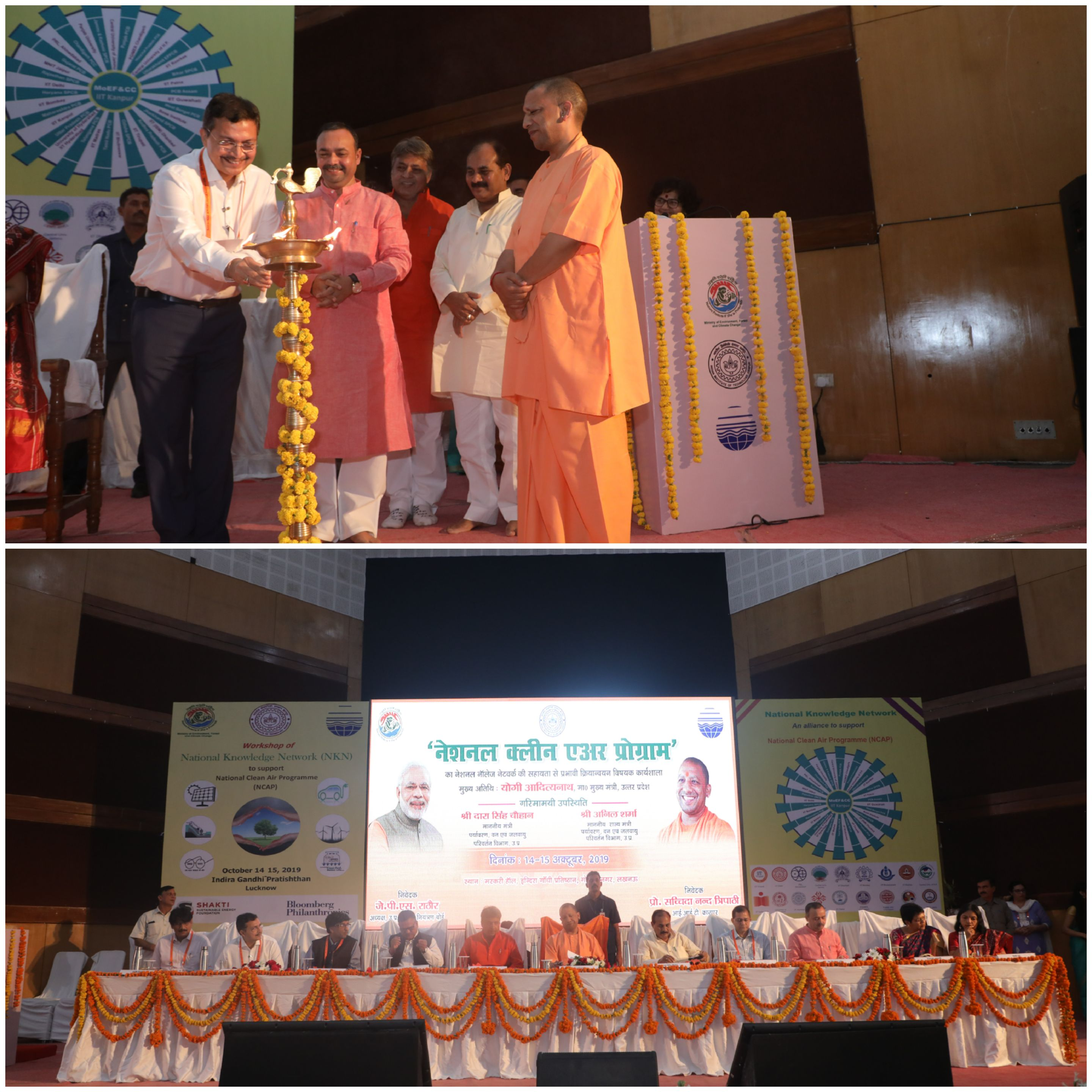
Inauguration of National Knowledge Network, National Clean Air Program, Lucknow, India, 2019

=== National Clean Air Programme (NCAP) ===
Tripathi is an expert member of the National Clean Air Programme (NCAP), launched by the Ministry of Environment, Forest and Climate Change (MoEF&CC) in 2018. NCAP is a long-term, time-bound strategy aimed at improving air quality in urban centres, with a target of reducing particulate matter concentrations by 20–30% from 2017 levels by 2024.

=== National Knowledge Network for Air Quality Management ===
To support NCAP, Tripathi played a key role in forming the National Knowledge Network (NKN), an alliance of technical institutions including IITs, NITs, and national laboratories. The NKN works with urban local bodies to enhance their capacity in air quality management and to support cities in achieving NCAP targets through scientific and technological interventions.
