= Jahnavi Phalkey =

- Occupations: museum director; academic; filmmaker
- Known for: Atomic State: Big Science in Twentieth Century India; Founding Director, Science Gallery Bengaluru
- Awards: Infosys Prize in Humanities (2023)

Academic background
- Education: Elphinstone College (B.A.); University of Mumbai (M.A.); School of Oriental and African Studies, University of London (M.Sc.); Georgia Institute of Technology (Ph.D.)
- Thesis: Science, state-formation and development: the organisation of nuclear research in india, 1938-1959. (2007)
- Doctoral advisor: John Krige

Academic work
- Notable works: Atomic State (2013); Cyclotron (documentary, 2020)

Jahnavi Phalkey is an academic, institution builder and a filmmaker. She is the founding director of Science Gallery Bengaluru, which opened to the public in Bengaluru, India, in 2024. She previously held a permanent faculty position in the history of science and technology at King's College London. Her research centres on the twentieth century and recent history of science and technology; public engagement with science; and public humanities.

Phalkey was awarded the Infosys Prize in the Humanities (2023) for her academic work and a Devi Award from The New Indian Express Group, for promoting public engagement with science (2024).

== Early life and education ==
Phalkey studied civics and politics before turning to the history of science. She holds a BA from Elphinstone College and an MA from the University of Mumbai. She later earned an MSc from School of Oriental and African Studies, University of London and was awarded a PhD in the history of science and technology by the Georgia Institute of Technology in 2007.

== Academic appointments ==
Phalkey taught at the University of Heidelberg, at Georgia Tech's campus in Lorraine, France and held a Junior Research Fellowship at Imperial College London before she joined the faculty of King's College London in 2011 and where she stayed until 2018. In 2013–14 she was Fellow at the Wissenschaftskolleg zu Berlin, where she worked on a project on statistics and the state in India.

== Editorial roles ==
Phalkey edits BJHS Themes, published by Cambridge University Press for the British Society for the History of Science. She also edits South Asian Studies, published by Taylor & Francis for the British Association for South Asian Studies.

== Institution building and curatorial work ==
In 2017-18 she left King's College London to establish Science Gallery Bengaluru, which is a member of the international Science Gallery Network, India’s only, and its first site in Asia.

The gallery opened its 112000 sq.ft purpose-built premises in 2024 with an exhibition on carbon. The Economist described it as aiming to work as "a two-way bridge between research and the public." It called the gallery an independent convener linking India's teaching universities and research institutes, which otherwise operate largely apart.

Phalkey designed the gallery's Public Lab Complex, a set of experimental spaces meant to bring scholars, artists and the public together. In her words, it is "the pioneering idea in Bengaluru," extending the Science Gallery Network's exhibition-only model into shared research space.

An earlier exhibition Phalkey co-curated, the online Contagion (2021), examined the history and culture of infectious-disease transmission during the COVID-19 pandemic. The Lancet reviewed it, noting the exhibition's aim of making a frightening pandemic moment more approachable by setting it within a longer history of epidemics.

Phalkey was a Scholar-in-Residence at the Deutsches Museum in Munich (2008). She later worked as an external curator to the Science Museum London.

== Filmmaking ==
Phalkey has directed two documentary films: The Gold of a Yellow Plant (2022) and Cyclotron (2020). Cyclotron is about the world's oldest functioning particle accelerator, at Panjab University in Chandigarh, India.

== Select publications ==
- Atomic State: Big Science in Twentieth-Century India (2013).
- Science of Giants: China and India in the Twentieth Century (2016), co-edited.
- Key Concepts in Modern Indian Studies (2015), co-edited.
