= Arindam Ghosh (physicist) =

Indian physicist

- Education: (B.Sc) University of Calcutta (M.Sc), (PhD) Indian Institute of Science (Postdoctoral research) University of Cambridge
- Awards: Shanti Swarup Bhatnagar Prize for Science and Technology; B. M. Birla Science Prize in Physics; DAE Raja Ramanna Prize Lecture in Physics; YIM Young Scientist Award, Boston; Oxford Instruments Young NanoScientist Award; Infosys Prize (2020) in Physical Sciences
- Scientific career
- Fields: Condensed Matter Physics
- Workplaces: Indian Institute of Science

Arindam Ghosh is an Indian experimental condensed matter physicist and a professor in the Department of Physics, Indian Institute of Science, Bangalore, India. He was awarded the Shanti Swarup Bhatnagar Prize for science and technology, the highest science award in India, for the year 2012 in physical sciences category. In 2020, he was awarded the Infosys Prize for Physical Science, the most prestigious award that recognizes achievements in science and research, in India.

== Education and career ==
Ghosh obtained his BSc degree with physics honours from St. Xaviers College, Kolkata which was then part of the Calcutta University (1991). Following the graduation, he became an Integrated PhD student at IISc, Bangalore where he did his masters (1994) and PhD (1999) in Physics. He was then a postdoctoral research associate at the University of Cambridge, UK (2000–2005). Ghosh then came back to IISc to take up a position as an assistant professor (2005–2011) followed by an associate professor (2011–2017). In 2017, he was promoted to a full professor of physics at the Department of Physics, IISc Bangalore. During his tenure at IISc, he was also a visiting research fellow in Nanotechnology at T J Watson Research Center of IBM, Yorktown Heights, New York, US (May 2009 – Sept 2009).

== Awards ==
In December 2020, he received the Infosys Prize for Physical Sciences for his development of atomically thin two-dimensional semiconductors to build a new generation of functional electronic, thermoelectric and optoelectronic devices.

== Research ==
His current research interests include the transport properties of two-dimensional electronic systems in semiconductors, carbon-based low-dimensional systems, optoelectronic properties of atomically-thin semiconductor membranes, magnetic nanostructures, and structural stability of nanoscale systems such as metallic nanowires and nanoparticles.
