= Govindasamy Mugesh =

Indian chemist and professor

- Born: 29 May 1970 (age 56); Tamil Nadu, India
- Education: University of Madras; Bharathidasan University; IIT Mumbai; Brunswick University of Technology; University of Düsseldorf; Scripps Research Institute
- Known for: Studies on the mechanism of thyroid hormone action and Enzyme mimetics
- Awards: Shanti Swarup Bhatnagar Prize (2012); CRSI Silver Medal (2019); Infosys Prize (2019)
- Scientific career
- Fields: Chemical biology; Bioinorganic chemistry
- Workplaces: Indian Institute of Science, Bangalore
- Doctoral advisor: H. B. Singh
- Other academic advisors: H. B. Singh; K. C. Nicolaou; Helmut Sies; Wolf - Walther du Mont
- Website: https://www.mugesh-iisc.in/

Govindasamy Mugesh (born 1970) is an Indian inorganic and physical chemist, a professor and the head of the Mugesh Laboratory attached to the department of Inorganic and Physical Chemistry at the Indian Institute of Science. He is known for his studies on the mechanism of thyroid hormone action and is an elected fellow of the Indian Academy of Sciences, Indian National Science Academy, Royal Society of Chemistry and the National Academy of Sciences, India. The Council of Scientific and Industrial Research, the apex agency of the Government of India for scientific research, awarded him the Shanti Swarup Bhatnagar Prize for Science and Technology, one of the highest Indian science awards, in 2012, for his contributions to chemical sciences. In 2019, he was awarded the Infosys Prize in Physical Sciences for his seminal work in the chemical synthesis of small molecules and nanomaterials for biomedical applications.

== Biography ==
Born on 29 May 1970 in the south Indian state of Tamil Nadu, G. Mugesh completed his graduate studies in chemistry at the University of Madras in 1990. After obtaining a master's degree from the Bharathidasan University in 1993, he enrolled for his doctoral degree at the Indian Institute of Technology, Mumbai under the guidance of H. B. Singh to secure a PhD in 1998. Remaining at the institute, he did his post doctoral studies there till 2000 and moved to continue his studies at the laboratories of de:Wolf-Walther du Mont of Brunswick University of Technology and de:Helmut Sies of University of Düsseldorf on an Alexander von Humboldt fellowship till 2001. After obtaining a Skaggs Postdoctoral Fellowship, he moved to the US to work with K. C. Nicolaou at the Scripps Research Institute. On his return to India in 2002, he joined the Indian Institute of Science as an assistant professor where he rose in ranks to become an associate professor in 2006 and a professor at the department of inorganic and physical chemistry in 2012. At IISc, he heads the Mugesh Laboratory attached to it.

== Legacy ==
Mugesh is known to have carried out extensive researches on the chemistry of thyroid hormone metabolism and his work has assisted in widening the understanding of organic/inorganic synthesis and enzyme mimetic studies. He is credited with the development of therapeutic protocols for endothelial dysfunction and neurodegenerative diseases and with notable work on β-lactamase-based antibiotic resistance. His research has been documented by way of a number of peer-reviewed articles; ResearchGate and Google Scholar, two online article repositories of scientific articles, has listed 151 and 153 of them respectively. He has done many clinical trials including the one on a compound developed by him for use as an anti-thyroid agent. He has also been associated with science journals such as Organic and Biomolecular Chemistry, ACS Omega of the American Chemical Society, Bioorganic Chemistry of Elsevier and Scientific Reports of Nature Publishing Group as a member of their editorial boards. He serves as the vice president of the Asian Chemical Editorial Society (ACES) which publishes three science journals viz. Chemistry – An Asian Journal, Asian Journal of Organic Chemistry, and ChemNanoMat.

== Awards and honors ==
Mugesh received the International Award for Young Chemists of the International Union of Pure and Applied Chemistry (IUPAC) and the Alexander von Humboldt Foundation Equipment Award in 2005. The World Academy of Sciences selected him as a Young Affiliate in 2008 and he received the UKIERI Standard Research Award in 2009. The year 2010 brought him four awards, viz. the Bronze Medal of the Chemical Research Society of India, Young Scientist Award of InterAcademy Panel, RSC-West India Young Scientist Award and the Award for Excellence in Drug Research of Central Drug Research Institute. The next year, he was chosen for AstraZeneca Excellence in Chemistry Award and the Council of Scientific and Industrial Research awarded him the Shanti Swarup Bhatnagar Prize, one of the highest Indian science awards, in 2012. He was awarded the Asian Rising Star Commemorative Plaque at the 15th Asian Chemical Congress organized by the Federation of Asian Chemical Societies (FACS) in 2013 and he was selected for the ISCB Award for Excellence by the Indian Society of Chemists and Biologists in 2016.

He has been a holder of an Alexander von Humboldt fellowship during his post-doctoral days, Swarnajayanthi Fellowship (2006–07), Ramanna Fellowship (2008–09) and the J. C. Bose National Fellowship (2015) of the Department of Science and Technology and the Invitation Fellowship of the Japan Society for the Promotion of Science (2016). Mugesh was elected as a fellow by the Indian Academy of Sciences and the National Academy of Sciences, India in 2010 by the Royal Society of Chemistry in 2013 and by the Indian National Science Academy in 2016. Dr. R. A. Mashelkar Endowment Lecture of the National Chemical Laboratory (2014) and the Prof. S. K. Pradhan Endowment Lecture of the Institute of Chemical Technology (2014) feature among the several guest lectures he has delivered. In 2020, Mugesh became a laureate of the Asian Scientist 100 by the Asian Scientist.

== See also ==
- K. C. Nicolaou
