= Jayant Haritsa =

Indian computer scientist and professor

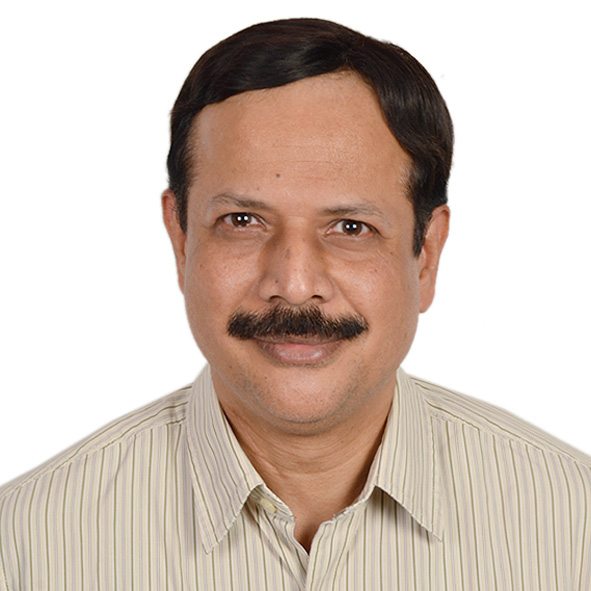
- Occupations: Faculty of CDS and CSA departments at Indian Institute of Science
- Years active: 1990−present
- Website: dsl.cds.iisc.ac.in/~haritsa/

Jayant R. Haritsa is an Indian computer scientist and professor. He is on the faculty of the Computational & Data Science (CDS) and Computer Science & Automation (CSA) departments at Indian Institute of Science, Bangalore, India. He is also the Dean, Faculty of Engineering at the Indian Institute of Science. He works on the design and analysis of Database Systems. In 2009 he won the Shanti Swarup Bhatnagar Prize sponsored by CSIR, India. In 2014 he won the Infosys Prize for Engineering.

== Early life ==
He did his SSLC from Vijaya High School, Jayanagar, Bangalore and Pre-University in Science, from National College (Basavanagudi), Bangalore. He did his B.Tech (Electronics) from Dept. of Electrical Engineering, Indian Institute of Technology, Madras and MS and PhD (Computer Science), Computer Sciences Department, University of Wisconsin, Madison.

== Career ==
He became a Research Fellow in Institute for Systems Research, University of Maryland (College Park). He later became the chairman of the Computer Science & Automation department at the Indian Institute of Science.

=== Professional activities ===
- General Co-Chair, SIGMOD 2026
- Co-Chair, ACM PTF on Regional Offices
- Member, ACM India Awards Steering Committee
- Program Co-Chair, 42nd Intl. Conf. on Very Large Data Bases, VLDB 2016, New Delhi, India
- Program Co-Chair, 26th Intl. Conf. on Data Engineering, ICDE 2010, Los Angeles, USA
- Tutorial Co-Chair, 19th Intl. World Wide Web Conference, WWW 2010, Raleigh, USA
- Editorial Board, IEEE Trans. on Knowledge and Data Engineering (TKDE), IEEE
- Editorial Board, Intl. Journal on Very Large Data Bases (VLDBJ), Springer
- Editorial Board, Intl. Journal of Distributed and Parallel Databases(JDPD), Springer
- Editorial Board, Intl. Journal of Real-Time Systems (JRTS), Springer

== Honors ==
- Asian Scientist 100, Asian Scientist, 2016
- ACM Fellow, 2015
- IEEE Fellow, 2013
- Distinguished Alumnus, Indian Institute of Technology, Madras, India, 2012
- Shanti Swarup Bhatnagar Prize, CSIR, 2009
- President, Association of Computing Machinery, India (ACMI), 2020–22
- Fellow, Indian National Science Academy (INSA), 2020
- Fellow, Indian Academy of Sciences (IASc), India, 2010
- Fellow, Indian National Academy of Engineering (INAE), India, 2009
- Fellow, The National Academy of Sciences (NASI), India, 2006
- J C Bose National Fellow, DST, Govt. of India, 2015
- IISc Alumni Award for Excellence in Research for Engineering, 2015
- Infosys Prize (Engineering and Computer Science), Infosys Science Foundation, 2014
- ACCS-CDAC Foundation Award, Advanced Computing and Communication Society, 2013
- Hari Om Ashram Prerit Dr. Vikram Sarabhai Research Award (Electronics, Informatics, Telematics and Automation), PRL, Govt. of India, 2007
- Swarnajayanti Fellowship (Engineering Sciences), DST, Govt. of India, 2002
- Sir C V Raman Young Scientist Award (Computer Science), KSCST, Govt. of Karnataka, 2001
- Research Awards from IBM, Google, Microsoft and HP

== Talks/Panel Discussions ==
- SIGMOD 2026 Invited Talk - Indian Database Research: The Journey to SIGMOD 2026.
- World Laureates Summit 2026 - AI Science Forum 2026.
- PGConf 2026 - Performant SQL Rewrites using LLMs.
