= Vidita Vaidya =

Indian scientist

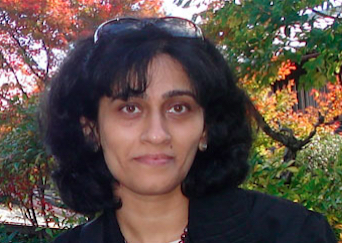
- Education: St. Xavier's College, Mumbai; Yale University
- Awards: Shanti Swarup Bhatnagar Prize, 2015 National Bioscience Award for Career Development, 2012 Fellow, Indian National Science Academy Infosys Prize in Life Sciences, 2022
- Scientific career
- Fields: Neuroscience with a focus on studying the neurocircuitry of emotion
- Workplaces: Tata Institute of Fundamental Research, Mumbai
- Doctoral advisor: Professor Ronald Duman at Yale University

Vidita Vaidya is an Indian neuroscientist and professor at the Tata Institute of Fundamental Research, Mumbai. Her primary areas of research are neuroscience and molecular psychiatry.

== Early life ==
Vidita's parents, Dr. Rama Vaidya and Dr. Ashok Vaidya are clinician scientists, and her uncle Dr. Akhil Vaidya (a Malaria Parasitologist) were a big motivation for her to pursue a career in research, with a focus on Neuroscience. Her father was a clinical pharmacologist, and her mother is an endocrinologist. She was also influenced by reading about the life and work of Jane Goodall, during her teenage years.

== Education ==
Vidita received her undergraduate degree from St. Xavier's College, Mumbai in Life Sciences and Biochemistry. She obtained her doctoral degree in Neuroscience at Yale University with Professor Ronald Duman, whose mentorship shaped her research career. Her postdoctoral work was done at the Karolinska Institute in Sweden with Professor Ernest Arenas and at the University of Oxford in UK with Professor David Grahame-Smith.

== Career ==
She joined the Department of Biological Sciences, TIFR at the age of 29, in March, 2000, as a principal investigator. She has been a Wellcome Trust Overseas Senior Research Fellow and an associate of the Indian Academy of Sciences from 2000 to 2005. Vidita studies the neurocircuits that regulate emotion and how they are influenced by life experiences, and antidepressants. She also investigates how changes in brain circuits form the basis of psychiatric disorders like depression and how early life experiences contribute to persistent alterations in behaviour. One of the focus areas of her research group is the role of the serotonin2A receptor both as a target of serotonergic psychedelics that exert powerful effects on mood-related behavior, and also in how it contributes to shaping the long-lasting consequences of early adversity.

Vidita's research has also been centered around the role of serotonin in shaping neurocircuits of emotion during critical periods of postnatal development and on the mechanism of action of fast acting antidepressant treatments. Her lab work is conducted on lab rats and mice. Vidita's particular field of interest lies in understanding how individuals develop vulnerability or resilience to stress-associated psychopathology.

== Achievements ==
Her work has garnered the 2015 Shanti Swarup Bhatnagar Prize for Science and Technology for Medical Sciences. She is also a recipient of the National Bioscience Award for Career Development in 2012. She received the Nature Award for Mentorship in Science, 2019, in the mid-career category. She received the Infosys Prize in Life-Sciences in 2022 for her fundamental contributions to understanding brain mechanisms that underlie mood disorders such as anxiety and depression, including signals engaged by the neurotransmitter serotonin in causing persistent changes in behavior induced by early life stress and the role of serotonin in energy regulation in brain cells.

== Awards ==
She was awarded the National Bioscientist Award in 2012, the prestigious Shanti Swarup Bhatnagar Prize in 2015 in the medical sciences category and is a Fellow of the Indian National Science Academy, National Academy of Sciences, India and the Indian Academy of Sciences. She received the J.C. Bose Fellowship from SERB, Govt. of India in 2021 and the Infosys Prize in Life-Sciences in 2022 . The following year, she became a laureate of the Asian Scientist 100 by the Asian Scientist.

== Features in Books and Videos ==
Vidita has been featured in Lilavathi's Daughters, a compilation of biographical essays on Indian women scientists, and on "The Life in Science" blog. In 2015, she gave a TEDx talk at St. Xavier's College, Mumbai in which she spoke about how stress can change our neurological makeup. She has also been featured in TIFRs "Chai and Why".

== Publications ==
Her site at TIFR hosts a complete list of her publications.

== Personal life ==
Vidita's research career was supported by her late husband, Ajit Mahadevan, who worked in the area of impact investing. They have a daughter, Alina Vaidya Mahadevan. In her spare time, Vidita likes to travel, read, and dance.

== See also ==
- TIFR
