= Arun Kumar Shukla =

Indian structural biologist

- Born: Kushinagar, Uttar Pradesh, India
- Education: Jawaharlal Nehru University; Max Planck Institute; Duke University; Stanford University
- Known for: Studies on G protein-coupled receptor
- Awards: 2025 Fellow, TWAS in Biological Sciences; 2024 OPPI Scientist of the Year Award; 2023 Infosys Prize in Life Sciences; 2022 Fellow, Indian National Science Academy; 2021 Fellowship, Indian Academy of Sciences; 2021 Khosla National Award of IIT Roorkee; 2021 Fellowship, National Academy of Sciences; 2021 Shanti Swarup Bhatnagar Prize for Science and Technology; 2019 Rajib Goyal Prize by Kurukshetra University; 2017 B. M. Birla Science Prize; 2016 NASI-Young Scientist Platinum Jubilee Award; 2017 EMBO Young Investigator Award; 2017/18 N-BIOS Prize; 2018 ICMR Shakuntala Amir Chand Prize; 2018 CDRI Award
- Scientific career
- Fields: Structural biology
- Workplaces: Duke University; Indian Institute of Technology, Kanpur
- Doctoral advisor: Hartmut Michel; Robert J. Lefkowitz; Brian Kobilka

Arun Kumar Shukla is an Indian structural biologist and the Joy-Gill Chair professor at the department of biological sciences and bioengineering at the Indian Institute of Technology, Kanpur. Known for his studies on G protein-coupled receptor, Shukla is a Wellcome Trust-DBT Intermediate Fellow and a recipient of the SwarnaJayanti Fellowship of the Department of Science and Technology. The Department of Biotechnology of the Government of India awarded him the National Bioscience Award for Career Development, one of the highest Indian science awards, for his contributions to biosciences, in 2017/18. He received the 2021 Shanti Swarup Bhatnagar Prize for Science and Technology in Biological Science. He was awarded the Infosys Prize 2023 in Life Sciences his outstanding contributions to the biology of G-protein coupled receptors (GPCRs).

== Biography ==
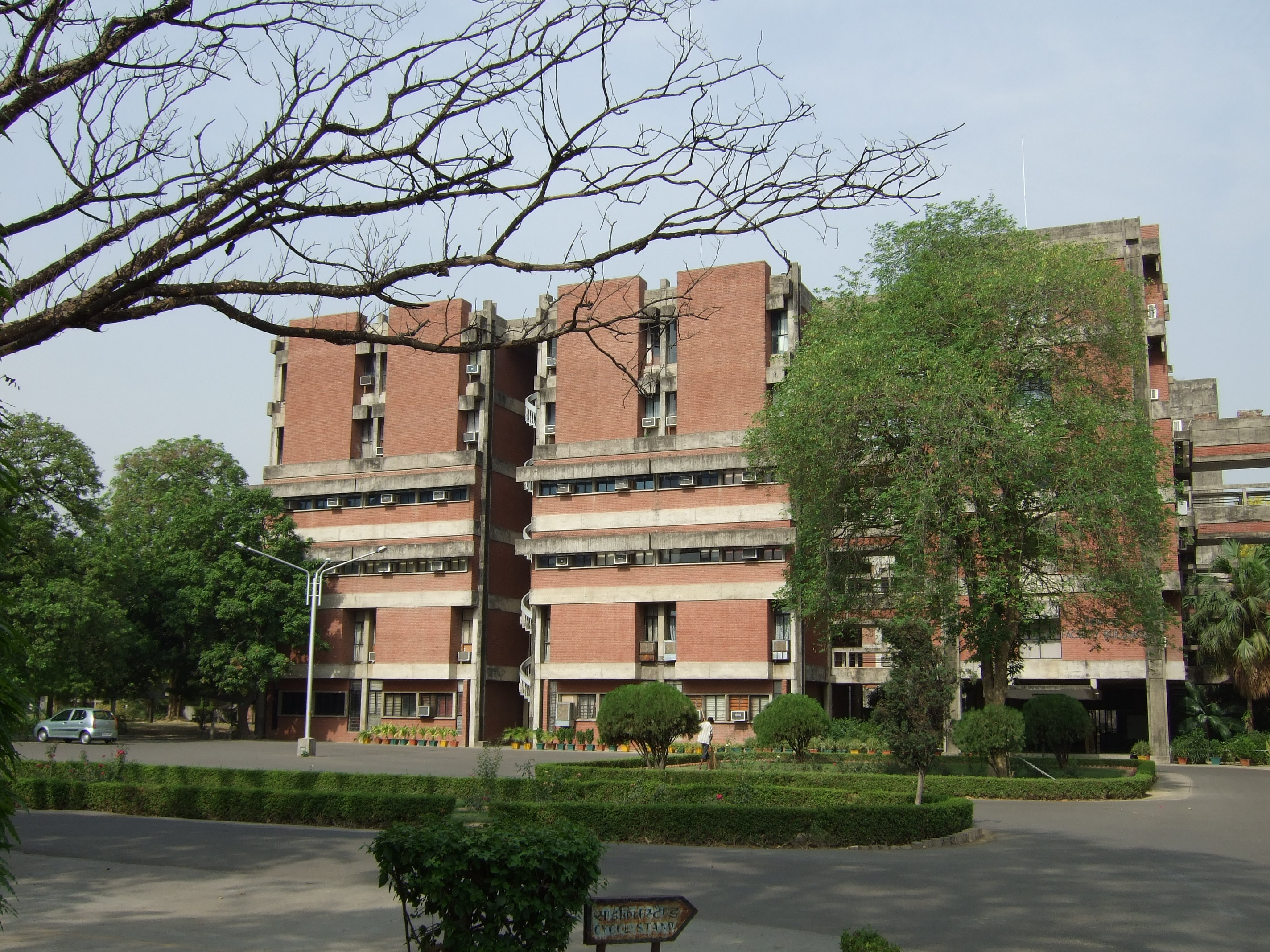
IIT Kanpur

Dr. Arun Kumar Shukla was born on 1 November 1981 in Kushinagar in the Indian state of Uttar Pradesh, earned his master's degree in biotechnology from Jawaharlal Nehru University after which he did his doctoral studies under the guidance of Hartmut Michel (Nobel Laureate, 1988) of Max Planck Institute of Biophysics. His post-doctoral work was with Robert J. Lefkowitz (Nobel Laureate, 2012) of Duke University and Brian Kobilka (Nobel Laureate, 2012) of Stanford University and he started his career at Duke University as an assistant professor at their department of medicine. Returning to India, he joined the Indian Institute of Technology, Kanpur (IITK) at the Department of Biological Sciences and Bioengineering (BSBE) where he holds the position of a professor and heads the Laboratory of GPCR Biology.

Shukla is known to have carried out extensive research on G protein-coupled receptor and his research is reported to have led to easier regulation of these receptors for better drug efficacy. He led a team of IITK scientists who developed nanomachines which could be designed to selectively target signalling events inside living cells. The technique developed by them is in use with several drugs that are available in the market such as Telmisartan, Olmesartan, Fexofenadine, Propranolol, and Metoprolol. He has published a number of articles and has contributed chapters to books published by others; (Note: Please see Selected bibliography section) Google Scholar, an online repository of scientific articles has listed 75 of them.

== Awards and honours ==
Shukla received the Infosys Prize 2023 in Life Sciences, he was selected for this prestigious award by an eminent jury chaired by MIT Professor, Mriganka Sur. He received the 2021 Shanti Swarup Bhatnagar Prize for Science and Technology in Biological Science. The Department of Biotechnology of the Government of India awarded him the National Bioscience Award for Career Development, one of the highest Indian science awards, for his contributions to biosciences, in 2017/18. He has also received the B. M. Birla Science Prize (2017), NASI-Young Scientist Platinum Jubilee Award of the National Academy of Sciences, India (2016), CDRI Award (2018), Shakuntala Amir Chand Prize of the Indian Council for Medical Research (2018) and the EMBO Young Investigator Award (2017). He was elected as a fellow of the Indian National Science Academy in 2022. In 2022 and 2024, Shukla was a laureate of the Asian Scientist 100 by the Asian Scientist.

== Selected bibliography ==
- Ghosh, Eshan; Nidhi, Kumari; Shukla, Arun K. (2014). "SnapShot: GPCR-Ligand Interactions". Cell. 159 (7): 1712–1712.e1. doi:10.1016/j.cell.2014.12.008. ISSN 0092-8674. PMID 25525884.
- Reiter, Eric; Ahn, Seungkirl; Shukla, Arun K.; Lefkowitz, Robert J. (11 January 2012). "Molecular Mechanism of β-Arrestin-Biased Agonism at Seven-Transmembrane Receptors". Annual Review of Pharmacology and Toxicology. 52 (1): 179–197. doi:10.1146/annurev.pharmtox.010909.105800. ISSN 0362-1642. PMC 3628752. PMID 21942629.
- Lefkowitz, Robert J.; Yates, John R.; Shenoy, Sudha K.; Chen, Minyong; Zhao, Yang; Shukla, Arun K.; McClatchy, Daniel B.; Xiao, Kunhong (17 July 2007). "Functional specialization of β-arrestin interactions revealed by proteomic analysis". Proceedings of the National Academy of Sciences. 104 (29): 12011–12016. Bibcode:2007PNAS..10412011X. doi:10.1073/pnas.0704849104. ISSN 1091-6490. PMC 1913545. PMID 17620599.
- Lefkowitz, Robert J.; Whalen, Erin J.; Muehlbauer, Michael J.; Chen, J. Ruthie; Lam, Christopher M.; DeWire, Scott M.; Violin, Jonathan D.; Kovacs, Jeffrey J.; Shukla, Arun K. (1 May 2009). "β-Arrestin1 mediates nicotinic acid–induced flushing, but not its antilipolytic effect, in mice". The Journal of Clinical Investigation. 119 (5): 1312–1321. doi:10.1172/JCI36806. ISSN 0021-9738. PMC 2673863. PMID 19349687.
- Lefkowitz, Robert J.; Gygi, Steven P.; Ma'ayan, Avi; Mizuno, Kensaku; Cheng, Yishan; Lin, Yuan; Zhao, Shan; Lachmann, Alexander; Hernandez, Marylens (24 August 2010). "Global phosphorylation analysis of β-arrestin–mediated signaling downstream of a seven transmembrane receptor (7TMR)". Proceedings of the National Academy of Sciences. 107 (34): 15299–15304. Bibcode:2010PNAS..10715299X. doi:10.1073/pnas.1008461107. ISSN 1091-6490. PMC 2930550. PMID 20686112.

== See also ==
- Cell signaling
- Arrestin
- Membrane proteins
