= Ayyappanpillai Ajayaghosh =

Indian organic chemist (born 1962)

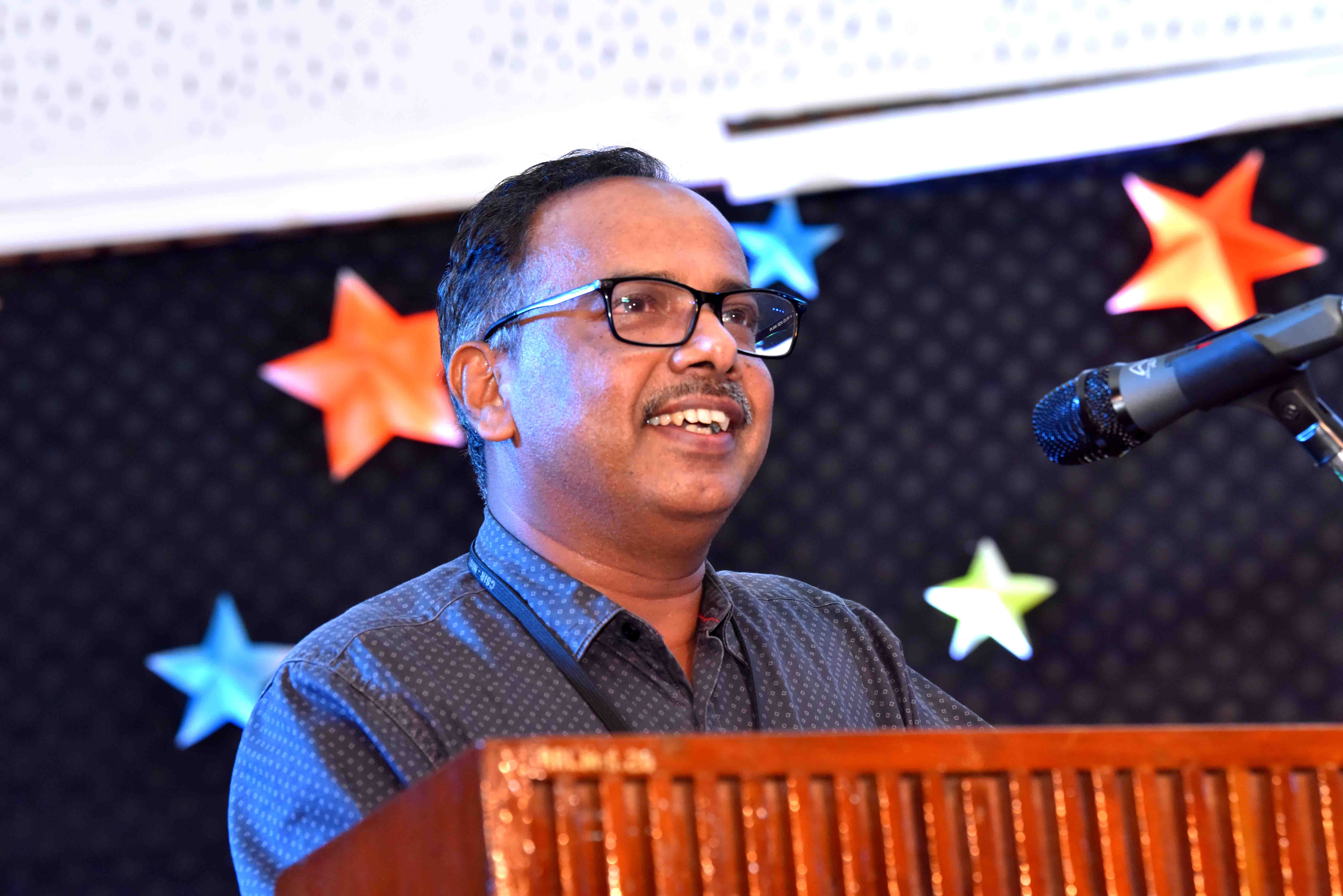
- Ayyappanpillai Ajayaghosh
- Born: 30 July 1962 (age 64); Kerala, India
- Education: University of Kerala; University of Calicut
- Known for: Studies on supramolecular assemblies
- Awards: 1988 ISCA Young Scientist Award; 1991 INSA Young Scientist Medal; 2002 CRSI Bronze Medal; 2007 MRSI Medal; 2007 S. S. Bhatnagar Prize; 2009 Thomson Reuters Research Excellence Award; 2009 DAE Outstanding Researcher Award; 2013 Infosys Prize; 2013 CRSI Silver Medal; 2013 TWAS Prize
- Scientific career
- Fields: Organic chemistry; Supramolecular chemistry
- Workplaces: National Institute for Interdisciplinary Science and Technology; Max Planck Institute SRM Institute of Science and Technology, Chennai
- Doctoral advisor: V. N. Rajasekharan Pillai

Ayyappanpillai Ajayaghosh (born 30 July 1962) is a research scientist/academician in the domain of interdisciplinary chemistry, and the former Director of the National Institute for Interdisciplinary Science and Technology. He is known for his studies on supramolecular assemblies, organogels, photoresponsive materials, chemosensory and security materials systems and is an elected fellow of all the three major Indian science academies viz. the National Academy of Sciences, India, Indian National Science Academy and the Indian Academy of Sciences as well as The World Academy of Sciences. The Council of Scientific and Industrial Research, the apex agency of the Government of India for scientific research, awarded him the Shanti Swarup Bhatnagar Prize for Science and Technology, one of the highest Indian science awards for his contributions to Chemical Sciences in 2007. He is the first chemist to receive the Infosys Science Prize for physical sciences, awarded by the Infosys Science Foundation. He received the TWAS Prize of The World Academy of Sciences in 2013 and the Goyal prize in 2019.

== Biography ==
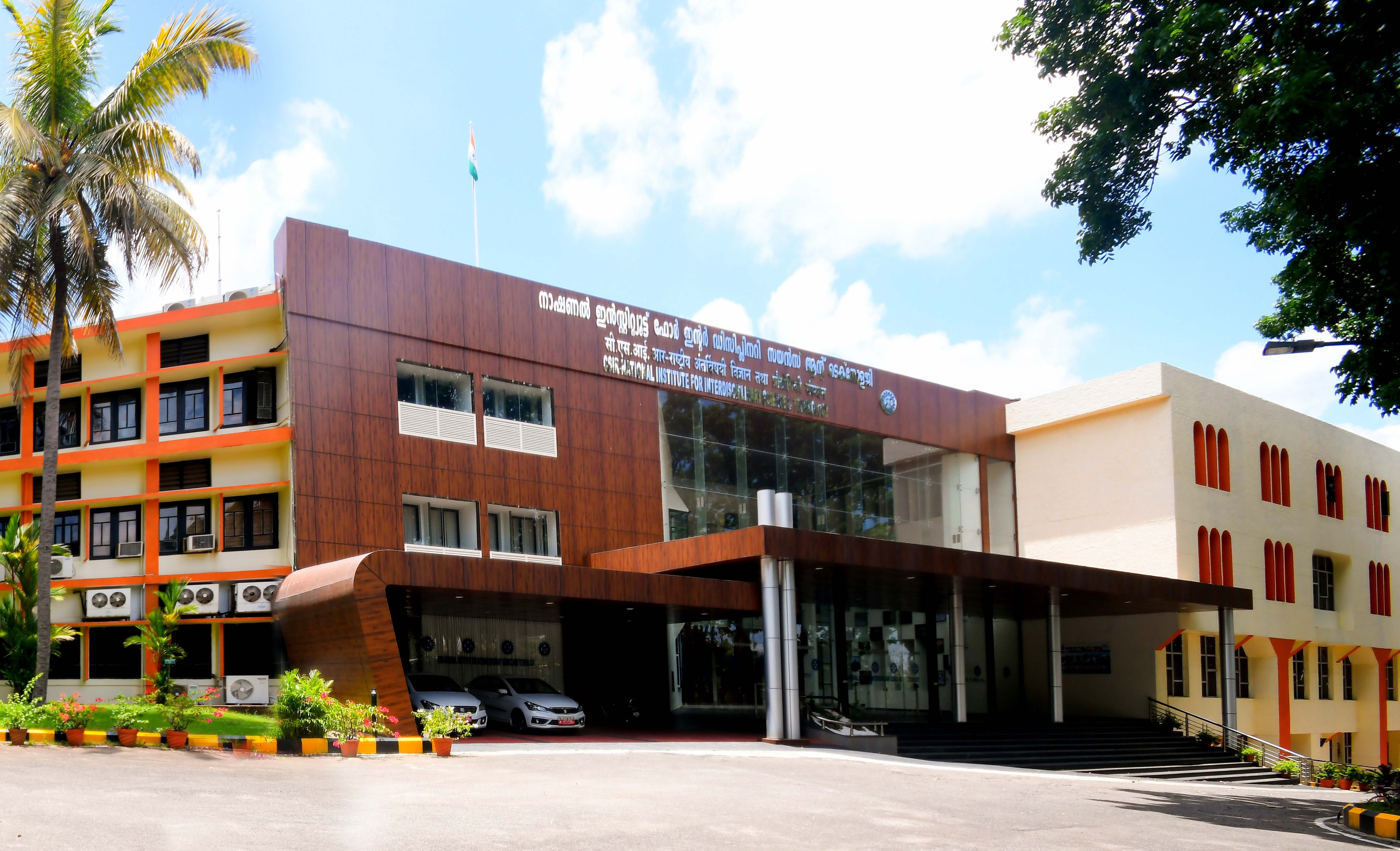
CSIR-NIIST

A. Ajayaghosh, born on 30 July 1962 in Kollam in the south Indian state of Kerala, graduated in science from the University of Kerala and completed his master's degree from Calicut university in 1984. Subsequently, working under the guidance of Prof. V. N. Rajasekharan Pillai, he secured a Ph.D. from University of Calicut in 1989; his thesis was on Solid-Phase Peptide Synthesis.

His career started in 1988 at the Regional Research Laboratory, presently the National Institute for Interdisciplinary Science and Technology (NIIST), of the Council of Scientific and Industrial Research, as a Scientist and held various positions before promoting to an Outstanding Scientist (Scientist-H) and the head of the Photosciences and Photonics Group of NIIST. Subsequently he became the head of the Chemical Sciences and Technology group He was the director of the Institute from 2015 and held the additional responsibility as the Dean of Chemical Sciences, Academy of Scientific and Innovative Research (AcSIR) New Delhi. In between, he was as an Alexander von Humboldt Fellow at the Max Planck Institute for Strahlen Chemie, Germany during 1994–96. He served as an adjunct professor of Material Science Programme at the Indian Institute of Technology, Kanpur. Presently, he is a J. C. Bose National Fellow at CSIR-NIIST and an adjunct professor at IISER Thiruvananthapuram.

Ajayaghosh is married to Ambili, and together they have two children, one of whom is Anantharaman Ajay, known for his roles in the 2023 movie "Romancham", Gaganachari, and the YouTube channel "Appooppan and the Boys","Nissaram". The family resides in Thiruvananthapuram, Kerala.

== Legacy ==
Ajayaghosh's research have been principally in the fields of supramolecular chemistry, chemosensors, low band-gap polymers, fluorescent gels, organic nanostructures, and photoresponsive systems and he is reported to have done extensive researches on supramolecular architecture and light-induced sensor systems. He is known to have pioneered the study of molecular self-assembly in India and is credited with the creation of a new category of self-assembled materials that are functionally soft. His work assisted in the design of larger molecular structures using self-assembling molecules and demonstrated ways to control their electrical conductivity through controlling external factors like temperature which have reported use in applications involving light harvesting, sensing, imaging, and security. He was the first scientist to design functional Phenylenevinylene-based Organogels from designed building blocks, which has been detailed in his article, First Phenylenevinylene Based Organogels: Self-Assembled Nanostructures via Cooperative Hydrogen Bonding and π-Stacking, published in 2001. One of the commercial applications of his research is secret writing, thermally writable, non-copyable, and erasable fluorescent images useful for secret documentation by using a fluorescent gelator entrapped in a polystyrene film and the process has been developed by his team. His studies have been documented in several peer-reviewed articles; ResearchGate and Google Scholar, online repositories of scientific articles, have listed 202 and 162 of them respectively. He also holds patents for several processes he has developed.

Ajayaghosh is associated with several science journals around the world. He is an associate editor of Physical Chemistry Chemical Physics (PCCP), published by the Royal Society of Chemistry and a senior editor of the Bulletin of the Chemical Society of Japan. He is a former member of the advisory board of RSC Advances and sits in the editorial board of Chemistry: An Asian Journal. He has also guided several master's and doctoral scholars in their studies and has been involved in programs for the popularization of science and science awareness campaigns.

=== Patents ===
- Ayyappanpillai Ajayaghosh; Chakkooth Vijayakumar; Vakayil K. Praveen (10 September 2013). "White light emitting organogel and process thereof". Patent No. 8529790.
- Ayyappanpillai Ajayaghosh; Sivaramapanicker Sreejith (1 January 2013). "Pyrrole end-capped bipyridine assay powder for selective detection of zinc ions and a process for the preparation thereof". Patent No. 8344150.
- Ayyappanpillai Ajayaghosh; Sampath Srinivasan; Vakayil Praveen (4 December 2012). "Nanocomposite material useful for the preparation superhydrophobic coating and a process for the preparation thereof". Patent No. 8323732.

=== Selected articles ===
- Ajayaghosh, Ayyappanpillai, Subi J. George (2001). “First phenylenevinylene based organogels: self-assembled nanostructures via cooperative hydrogen bonding and π-stacking”. J. Am. Chem. Soc. 2001, 123, 21, 5148-5149. https://doi.org/10.1021/ja005933+.
- Ajayaghosh, Ayyappanpillai, Priya Carol, and Sivaramapanicker Sreejith (2005) “A Ratiometric Fluorescence Probe for Selective Visual Sensing of Zn^{2+}”. J. Am. Chem. Soc. 2005, 127, 43, 14962-14963. https://doi.org/10.1021/ja054149s.
- Ajayaghosh, Ayyappanpillai, Vakayil K. Praveen, Chakkooth Vijayakumar, Subi J. George (2007). “Molecular Wire Encapsulated into π Organogels: Efficient Supramolecular Light-Harvesting Antennae with Color-Tunable Emission”. Angew. Chem. Int. Ed. 2007, 46, 6260-6265. https://doi.org/10.1002/anie.200701925.
- Ajayaghosh, Ayyappanpillai, Vakayil K. Praveen (2008). “π-Organogels of Self-Assembled p-Phenylenevinylenes: Soft Materials with Distinct Size, Shape, and Functions”. Acc. Chem. Res. 2007, 40, 8, 644-656. https://doi.org/10.1021/ar7000364
- Vijayakumar, Chakkooth; Praveen, Vakayil K.; Kartha, Kalathil K.; Ajayaghosh, Ayyappanpillai (2011). "Excitation energy migration in oligo(p-phenylenevinylene) based organogels: structure-property relationship and FRET efficiency". Physical Chemistry Chemical Physics. 13 (11): 4942–4949. Bibcode:2011PCCP...13.4942V. doi:10.1039/C0CP02110E. PMID 21321716. S2CID 19328938.
- Kartha, Kalathil K.; Babu, Sukumaran S.; Srinivasan, Sampath; Ajayaghosh, Ayyappanpillai (2012). "Attogram sensing of trinitrotoluene with a self-assembled molecular gelator". Journal of the American Chemical Society. 134 (10): 4834–4841. doi:10.1021/ja210728c. PMID 22352376.
- SS Babu, VK Praveen, Ajayaghosh, Ayyappanpillai (2014). “Functional π-gelators and their applications”. Chem. Rev. 2014, 114, 4, 1973-2129. https://doi.org/10.1021/cr400195e
- R, D, Mukhopadhyay.; and Ajayaghosh, Ayyappanpillai (2015). “Living supramolecular polymerization”. Science 2015, 349, 241.doi:10.1126/science.aac7422
- S, Prasanthkumar.; S, Ghosh.; V, C, Nair.; A, Saeki.; S, Seki.; and Ajayaghosh Ayyappanpillai (2015). “Organic Donor-Acceptor Assemblies to Coaxial p-n Heterojunctions with High Photoconductivity”. Angew. Chem., Int. Ed. 2015, 54, 946-950. https://doi.org/10.1002/anie.201408831.
- B, Vedhanarayanan.; V, S, Nair.; V, C, Nair.; and Ajayaghosh, Ayyappanpillai (2016). “Formation of Coaxial Nanocables with Amplified Supramolecular Chirality through an Interaction between Carbon Nanotubes and a Chiral p-Gelator”. Angew. Chem., Int. Ed. 2016, 55, 10345-10349. https://doi.org/10.1002/anie.201605354.
- V, S, Nair.; R, D, Mukhopadhyay.; A, Saeki.; S, Seki.; and Ajayaghosh, Ayyappanpillai (2016). “A p-Gel Scaffold for Assembling Fullerene to Photoconducting Supramolecular Rods: Non-Equilibrium Self-Assembly of C_{60} in a p-Gel”. Science Advances 2016, 2, e1600142. doi:10.1126/sciadv.1600142
- R, D, Mukhopadhyay.; B, Vedhanarayanan.; and Ajayaghosh, Ayyappanpillai (2017). “Creation of 'Rose Petal' and 'Lotus Leaf' Effects on Alumina by Surface Functionalization and Metal Ion Coordination”. Angew. Chem. Int. Ed. 2017, 56, 16018-16022. https://doi.org/10.1002/anie.201709463.
- M, Hifsudheen.; R, K, Mishra.; B, Vedhanarayanan.; V, K, Praveen.; and Ajayaghosh, Ayyappanpillai (2017). “Helix to Super-Helix Transition in p-Systems Self-assembly: Superseding of Molecular Chirality at Hierarchical Level”. Angew. Chem., Int. Ed. 2017, 56, 12634-12638. https://doi.org/10.1002/anie.201707392.
- S, Ghosh.; S, Cherumukkil.; C, H, Suresh.; and Ajayaghosh, Ayyappanpillai (2017). “A Supramolecular Nanocomposite as Near Infrared Transmitting Optical Filter for Security and Forensic Applications”. Adv. Mater. 2017, 29, 1703783.doi:10.1002/adma.201703783
- A, Mal.; R, K, Mishra.; V, K, Praveen.; M, A, Khayum.; R, Banerjee.; and Ajayaghosh, Ayyappanpillai (2018). “Supramolecular Reassembly of Self-Exfoliated Ionic Covalent Organic Nanosheets for Label-Free Detection of dsDNA”. Angew. Chem., Int. Ed. 2018, 57, 8443. https://doi.org/10.1002/anie.201801352.
- R, D, Mukhopadhyay.; G, Das.; and Ajayaghosh, Ayyappanpillai (2018). “Stepwise Control of Host-Guest Interaction Using a Coordination Polymer Gel”. Nat. Commun. 2018, 9, 1987. https://doi.org/10.1038/s41467-018-04303-8.
- V, K, Praveen.; B, Vedhanarayanan.; A, Mal.; R, K, Mishra.; and Ajayaghosh Ayyappanpillai (2020). “Self-Assembled Extended p‑Systems for Sensing and Security Applications”. Acc. Chem. Res. 2020, 53, 2, 496-507. https://doi.org/10.1021/acs.accounts.9b00580
- S, Chakraborty.; M, M, Joseph.; S, Varughese.; S, Ghosh.; K, K, Maiti.; A, Samanta.; and Ajayaghosh, Ayyappanpillai (2020). “A New Pentacyclic Pyrylium Fluorescent Probe that Responds to pH Imbalance During Apoptosis”. Chem. Sci., 2020,11, 12695-12700. https://doi.org/10.1039/D0SC02623A.
- A. Mal, S. Vijayakumar, R. K. Mishra, J. Jacob, R. S. Pillai, B. S. Dileep Kumar and Ajayaghosh, Ayyappanpillai (2020). “Supramolecular Surface Charge Regulation in Ionic Covalent Organic Nanosheets for Reversible Exfoliation and Controlled Bacterial Growth”. Angew. Chem., Int. Ed. 2020, 59, 8713-8719. https://doi.org/10.1002/anie.201912363.
- G, Das.; S, Cherumukkil.; A, Padmakumar.; V, B, Banakar.; V, K, Praveen.; and Ajayaghosh, Ayyappanpillai (2021). “Tweaking a BODIPY Spherical Self-Assembly to 2D Supramolecular Polymers Facilitates Excited State Cascade Energy Transfer”. Angew. Chem. Int. Ed. 2021, 60, 7851-7938. https://doi.org/10.1002/ange.202015390.
- A, Nirmala.; I, Mukkatt.; S, Shankar.; and Ajayaghosh, Ayyappanpillai (2021). “Thermochromic Color Switching to Temperature Controlled Volatile Memory and Counter Operations with Metal-Organic Complexes and Hybrid Gels”. Angew. Chem., Int. Ed. 2021, 60, 455-465. https://doi.org/10.1002/anie.202011580.
- I, Mukkatt.; A, P, Mohanachandran.; A, Nirmala.; D, Patra.; P, A, Sukumaran.; R, S, Pillai.; R, B, Rakhi.; S, Shankar.; and Ajayaghosh, Ayyappanpillai (2022). “Tunable Capacitive Behavior in Metallopolymer-based Electrochromic Thin Film Supercapacitors”. ACS Appl. Mater. Interfaces, 2022, 14, 31900-31910. https://doi.org/10.1021/acsami.2c05744

== Awards ==
Major Awards

1. Young Scientist Medal (1988), by the Indian Science Congress Association, India.

2. INSA Young Scientist Medal (1991), by the Indian National Science Academy, New Delhi.

3. CRSI Bronze Medal (2002), by the Chemical Research Society of India.

4. MRSI Medal (2007), by Material Research Society of India.

5. Shanti Swarup Bhatnagar Prize (2007), awarded by CSIR, Govt. India.

6. DAE Outstanding Researcher Award (2009), awarded by Dept. Atomic Energy, Govt. India.

7. Thomson Reuters Research Excellence-India Research Front Award (2009).

8. The Infosys Prize for Physical Sciences 2012 by Infosys Science Foundation.

9. Khwarizmi International Award 2012 by Iranian Organisation for Science and Technology.

10. Swadeshi Innovation Award 2012 by the Swadeshi Science Movement, Kerala.

11. Sri Vidyadhiraja Samskrithi Puraskaram 2013 by Panmana Ashram, Quilon, Kerala.

12. CRSI Silver Medal 2013 by Chemical Research Society of India.

13. TWAS Chemistry Prize 2013 by The World Academy of Sciences, Trieste, Italy.

14. ISAS National Award for Excellence in Science and Technology 2014 by Indian Society of Analytical Scientists.

15. CHEMTECH CEW Award 2015 for Leadership and Excellence in Research and Development.

16. J. C. Bose National Fellowship, 2015, DST, Govt. India.

17. Web of Science-India Research Excellence-Citation Award 2017 by Clarivate Analytics.

18. MRSI Distinguished Lectureship Award, 2019-20, by Materials Research Society of India.

19. Goyal Prize for Chemical Science, 2019, by Kurukshetra University.

Other Honors

1. Certificate of Merit (1987) from the Indian Chemical Society for the best paper presentation, at the Convention of Chemists, 1987

2. Special Award and Citation (1988) of the Syndicate of Calicut University, Kerala, India for outstanding research contributions during 1985-1988

3. Swarnajayanti Research Grant (2001), Special research grant to outstanding young researchers by DST, Govt. India

4. Ramanna Fellow, DST (2007)

5. Adjunct Professor, Material Science Programme, IIT, Kanpur

6. Dean, Chemical Sciences, Academy of Scientific and Innovative Research (AcSIR)

7. A. V. Rama Rao Foundation Award Lecture of JNCASR, Bangalore (2012)

8. R. A. Mashelkar Endowment, NCL Pune (2012)

9. Chair on Nanoscience and Nanotechnology, Centre for Nanoscience and Nanotechnology, Mahatma Gandhi University, Kottayam, Kerala, 2013

10. Prof. K. K. M. Yusuff Endowment, Cochin University of Science and Technology, 2013

11. CHEMCON distinguished speaker award, 2016.

12. ISCB-2017 Award given by Indian Society of Chemists and Biologists.

Academy Fellowships

1. Fellow, Indian Academy of Sciences, Bangalore (2006)

2. Fellow, National Academy of Sciences, Allahabad, India (2011)

3. Fellow, Indian National Science Academy, New Delhi (2012)

4. Honorary Fellow, Kerala Academy of Sciences (2013)

5. Fellow, Royal Society of Chemistry, London (2014)

6. Fellow, The World Academy of Science (2015)

Research Fellowships

1. INSA-JSPS Exchange Fellow (1993), Chiba University, Japan during Aug.1993 Dec.1993
2. Alexander von Humboldt Fellow (1994), Max-Planck-Institut für Strahlenchemie, Germany, 1994-1996
3. DST-DAAD Exchange Fellow (2001), University of Regensburg, Germany
4. INSA-JSPS Exchange Fellow (2003), AIST Tsukuba, Japan during July-Sept.2003
- Macromolecular assembly
- Molecular self-assembly
- Nanoparticles
- Hydrogen bond
