= SpicyIP =

SpicyIP is a blog discussing copyright law of India. The founder was Shamnad Basheer.

In March 2019 Saregama, a music label, sent a Notice and take down request to SpicyIP seemingly in error through an Internet bot.

The writers for the blog file public interest litigation in India advocate for the public in matters of copyright.

The blog published a history and summary of an ongoing 19-year old dispute between India's The Times Group and the UK’s Financial Times. This coverage led to The Times Group threatening legal action claiming defamation.
