= Roop Mallik =

Indian biophysicist

Roop Mallik is an Indian biophysicist who works on nanoscale molecular motor proteins that transport material such as viruses, mitochondria, endosomes etc. inside living cells. The motors, such as kinesin and dynein generate forces of pico-newton order to carry our various cellular processes namely cell division, vesicular transport, endocytosis, molecular tethering etc. His lab is working to understand how motor proteins help in degradation and clearance of pathogens, and also how these motors work inside the liver to maintain systemic lipid homeostasis in the animal. Mallik is currently a professor at the Department of Biosciences and Bioengineering, Indian Institute of Technology Bombay (IIT Bombay).

== Early life ==
Mallik was born in 1970 in Allahabad, situated in the Northern India state of Uttar Pradesh. His father is a machine design engineer and mother was a senior teacher.

== Career ==
Mallik completed his post graduation in Physics in 1993 from Allahabad University. On the advice of his uncle, in 1994, he joined E. V. Sampathkumaran’s lab in Department of Condensed Matter Physics at Tata Institute of Fundamental Research, Mumbai for doctoral research . After the completion of his PhD with over 20 international articles, Mallik joined G. Krishnamoorthy (TIFR) and Jayant Udgaonkar's labs (NCBS) for short stint as post doctoral fellow. This small tenure introduced him to the world of biology. In 2002, he joined the lab of Steven Gross at Department of Developmental and Cell Biology, University of California, Irvine. In 2006 Mallik joined TIFR as assistant professor and became full professor in the Department of Biological Sciences. He moved from TIFR to the Indian Institute of Technology Bombay in 2020.

== Personal life ==
Mallik is married to Sreelaja Nair, a colleague at BSBE, IIT Mumbai. He is an avid outdoor enthusiast. He maintains a website of his travels and hikes.

== Awards ==
- Shanti Swarup Bhatnagar Prize for Science and Technology, 2014
