= Chetan Chitnis =

Indian malaria research scientist

- Born: Chetan Eknath Chitnis; 3 April 1961 (age 64); India
- Occupation: Scientist (Malaria research)
- Parent: Eknath Vasant Chitnis
- Awards: Shanti Swaroop Bhatnagar Award; Infosys Prize; IAS Fellow; INSA Fellow; BioSpectrum Person of the Year

Chetan Eknath Chitnis is an Indian scientist in the field of malaria research. He is the head of the Malaria Parasite Biology and Vaccines Unit at the Institut Pasteur in Paris and an elected fellow of the Indian Academy of Sciences (2009) as well as Indian National Science Academy (2014). He received the Shanti Swaroop Bhatnagar Award in 2004 and the Infosys Prize in Life Sciences 2010. Chitnis is the former principal investigator of the malaria research group at the International Centre for Genetic Engineering and Biotechnology (ICGEB) in New Delhi.

== Education and career ==
Chitnis completed his Master of Science in physics at Indian Institute of Technology Mumbai in 1983. Subsequently, he obtained a Master of Arts in physics from the Rice University in Houston, in 1985 and a doctor of philosophy (PhD) from the University of California-Berkeley in 1991 after which he worked at the National Institutes of Health in Bethesda, Maryland as a Fogarty International Fellow from 1991 to 1995. Returning to India, he joined the malaria research group in ICGEB in 1996 as the principal investigator and worked there until 2014 when he was appointed as the head of the Malaria Parasite Biology and Vaccines Unit at the Institut Pasteur in Paris.

Chitnis has published over 100 international papers and has three patents pertaining to malaria vaccines.

== Research interest ==
Chitnis's work is predominantly in the areas of molecular parasitology and vaccine development for malaria by understanding the molecular and cellular biology aspects of host-parasite interactions. His work has assisted in the development of antibodies against Plasmodium spp. and widened the understanding of the parasite-binding proteins and their interactions with the Duffy blood group antigen of the host red blood cells. Furthermore, his research group is involved in the studies of molecular signaling during the blood stage of Plasmodium falciparum, especially the process of invasion and egress from erythrocytes.

At ICGEB, Chitnis has also established a protein production facility for the production of malaria vaccines based on novel concepts.

== Other activities ==
- Barcelona Institute for Global Health (ISGlobal), Member of the External Advisory Committee

== Awards and honors ==
Chitnis, who received the University of California Regents' Fellowship, Henry Kaiser Fellowship and Abraham Rosenberg Research Fellowship during his doctoral research years, was a Fogarty International Fellow at the National Institutes of Health, Bethesda during 1991–96. The American Society for Microbiology awarded him the ICAAC Young Investigator Award in 1995 and he delivered the Dr. B.N. Singh Memorial Award Oration of the Indian Society for Parasitology in 1997. In the same year, he also won the MOT Iyengar Award for Research on Malaria.

He was International Research Scholar at Howard Hughes Medical Institute and an International Senior Research Fellow at the Wellcome Trust during the period 2000–05. The Council of Scientific and Industrial Research awarded him the Shanti Swarup Bhatnagar Prize in Medical Sciences, one of the highest Indian science awards, in 2004. He was a Tata Innovation Fellow from 2007 to 2009 and the Indian Academy of Sciences elected him as a fellow in 2009; the same year as he received the Distinguished Alumnus Award of Indian Institute of Technology Bombay. He became an elected fellow of the Indian National Science Academy in 2014 and in between, he received the Infosys Prize in Life Sciences in 2010 and the BioSpectrum Person of the Year award in 2011. In 2025, Chitnis was awarded the Padma Shri for his contribution in the field of medicine.
