= Imran Siddiqi =

Indian geneticist

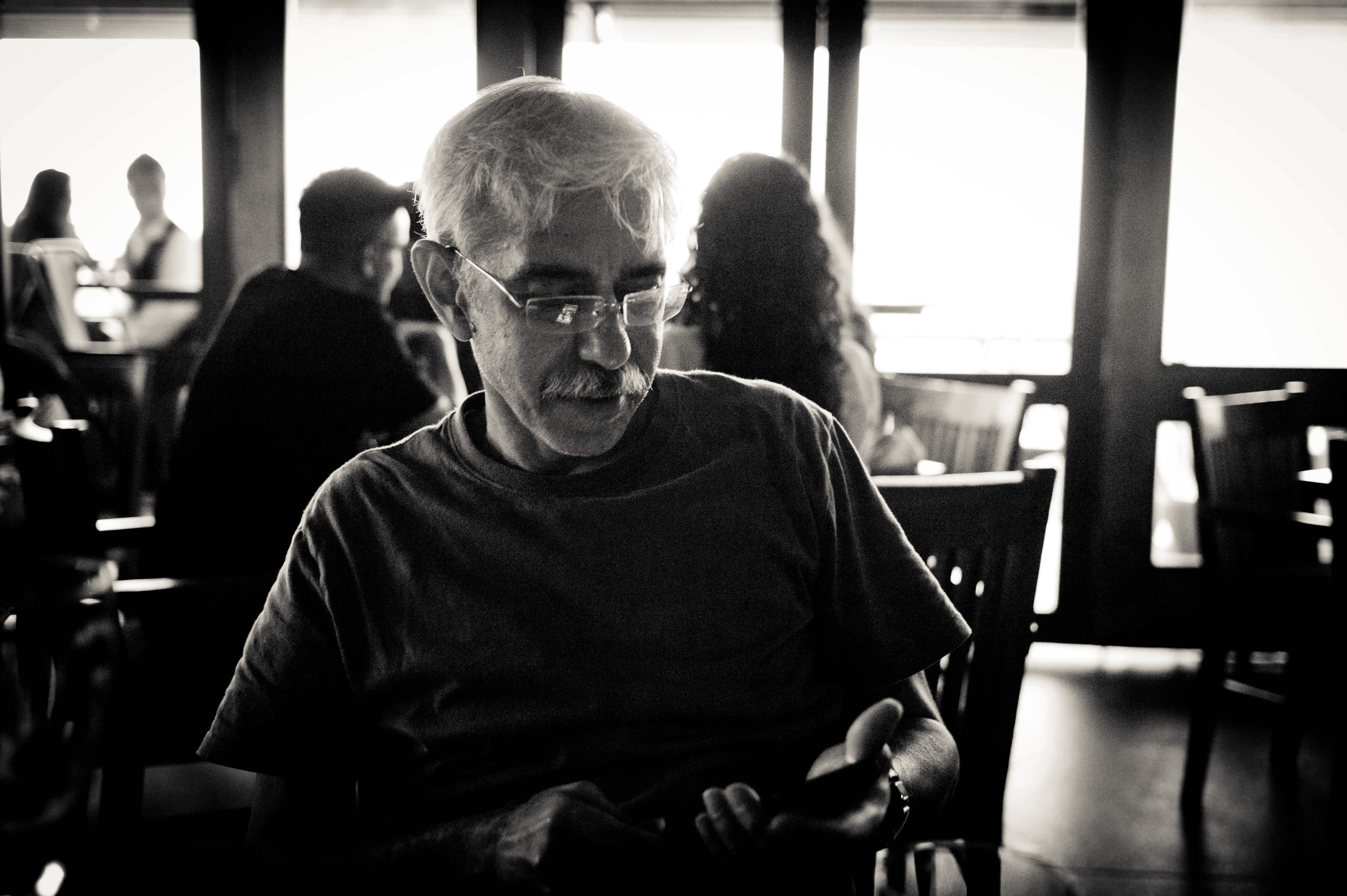
- Born: 7 September 1957 (age 68)
- Occupation: Geneticist

Imran Siddiqi (born 7 September 1957) is an Indian geneticist. Currently, he is a group leader at the Centre for Cellular and Molecular Biology (CCMB) and heads a research group.

== Education ==
In 1981, Siddiqi completed his Master of Science in chemistry from Indian Institute of Technology Bombay. Afterwards, his research, under the guidance of prof. Franklin Stahl, focused on genetic recombination in bacteriophage, which was the topic of his dissertation. He was awarded the degree of Doctor of Philosophy by the University of Oregon in 1989. Siddiqi's post‑doctoral work was carried out in Indian Institute of Science, situated in Bangalore.

== Career ==
Siddiqi's research is predominantly in the areas of genetics, plant development and genetic recombination. His research has shown a lot of promise and progress in the areas of meiosis, gametogenesis and apomixis (asexual reproduction) in plants. The fact that the seeds of high-yielding hybrid plants often fail to produce the same beneficial traits of the parent plants has been a limiting factor in revolutionizing agriculture, as it inhibits the hybrid traits from propagating through seeds. Major advances in these areas will help in the development of new plant breeding techniques, which will produce exact genetic clones of hybrid plants by engineering apomixis.

From 1992, he is a scientist at Centre for Cellular and Molecular Biology in Hyderabad. He was also responsible for the formation of a plant genetics research group and heads Siddiqi's lab at CCMB. Furthermore, he is a member of the editorial boards of the Journal of Biosciences, Journal of Genetics, BMC Plant Biology and Journal of Integrative Plant Biology.

== Awards and honors ==
In 2008, he was elected fellow of the Indian Academy of Sciences. In 2011, he was awarded the Infosys Prize, in the Life Sciences Category, by the Infosys Science Federation for his contributions to improve agriculture. In the same year, he was also elected as fellow of Indian National Science Academy
