= Standard Indian Legal Citation =

The Standard Indian Legal Citation (abbreviated SILC) is a legal citation guide developed in India to provide a uniform framework for referencing legal materials and academic writing in South Asia. It is the only foreign jurisdiction citation guide from Asia to be recognised by the Harvard Law School library. It has been considered an important early effort to unify citation practices across South Asia.

The citation guide was officially released in 2014 and had usage in 32 law schools. By 2015, it was used in more than 100 academic institutions across the country.

== History ==
Prior to the introduction of SILC, Indian law journals and academic institutions used different citation systems, based on foreign standards such as The Bluebook or OSCOLA.

The SILC was developed in 2013 by Rohit Pothukuchi (Editor-in-Chief), a graduate of NALSAR University of Law, along with Shambo Nandy, a Supreme Court advocate and former executive editor of the Journal of Indian Law and Society, and Debanshu Khettry, executive editor of the Journal of Telecommunication and Broadcasting Law. Senior editors included Akshay Sreevatsa.

The initiative involved a team of editors and advisory members drawn from various Indian law schools and legal institutions, such as the National Law School of India University (NLSIU), NALSAR, National University of Juridical Sciences (NUJS), and National Law University, Delhi (NLUD). Advisors to the working draft included Rajiv K. Luthra, the founding Partner of Luthra & Luthra, a major Indian law firm, Prof. MP Singh, former Chair of the Judicial Academy, Delhi, and the Vice Chancellors of major legal institutions.

== Overview ==
The SILC manual includes guidance for citing Indian sources (cases, legislative materials, articles, books, internet sources, law commission reports, working papers, forthcoming papers) and international sources (case law, statutes, constitutions, United Nations sources), as well as standard signs, signals, and abbreviations.

== See also ==
- Bluebook
- Legal citation
