= Law Society, Aligarh Muslim University =

The Law Society Aligarh Muslim University
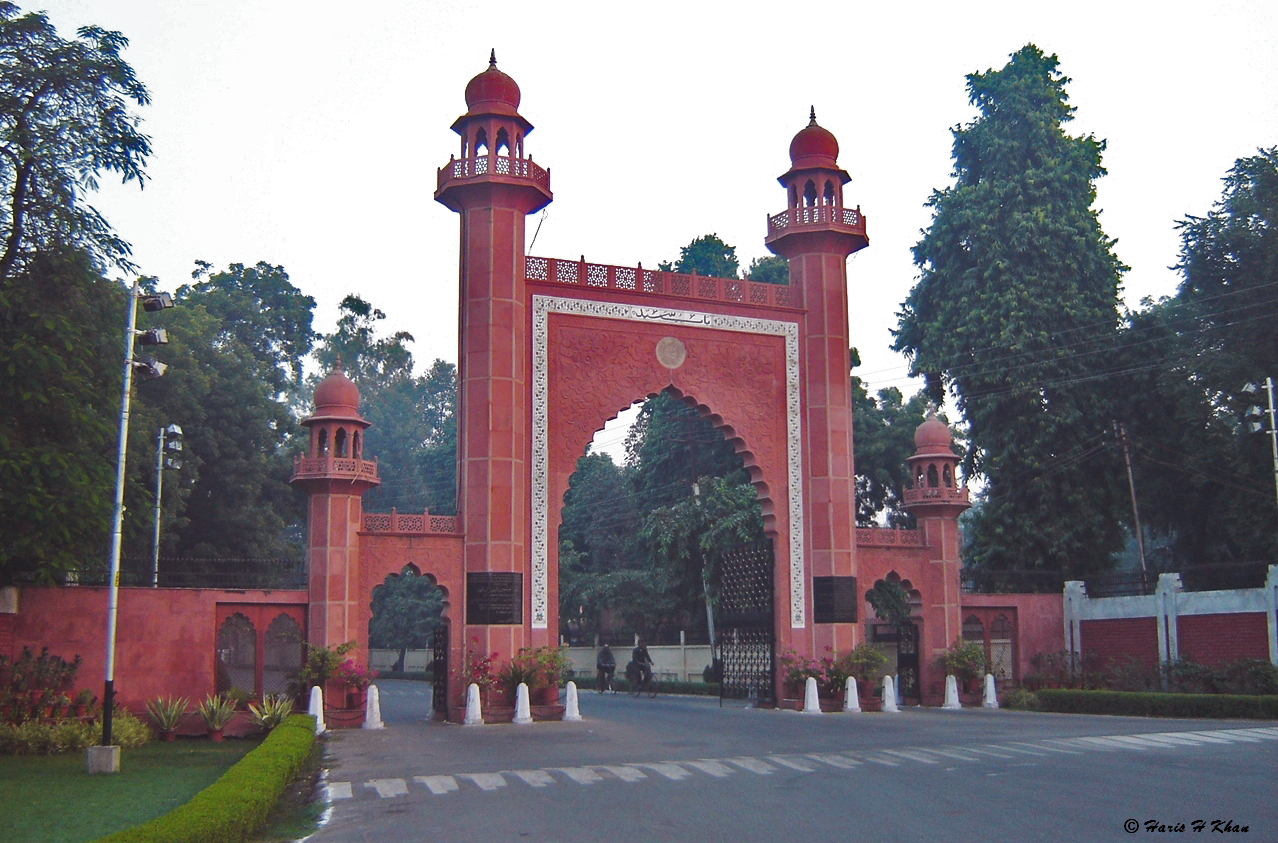
- Aligarh Muslim University
- Type: Student-run law society
- Established: 1894 (132 years ago)
- Founder: Faculty of Law, Aligarh Muslim University
- Academic affiliations: Aligarh Muslim University
- Students: 1000 (estd.)
- Location: Aligarh, India

The Law Society is a student body of the Faculty of Law at Aligarh Muslim University. The society has produced numerous lawyers, judges and politicians over the years. It functions as both an educational and representative body and has an estimated 1,000 active members. The Law Society is involved in training and preparing students for various competitive and academic activities of the faculty, including moot court, legal debate, quizzes, and judgment writing.

The society was founded in 1894 as a non-profit student organization and has a long-standing tradition of encouraging student participation and performance in legal affairs across different arenas. The Dean of the Faculty of Law, Aligarh Muslim University, serves as the president of the society. Mr. Hammad Khan is currently serving as the Hon'ble Vice President of the Law Society for the academic session 2026-27.

== President ==
The dean of the Faculty of Law, Aligarh Muslim University, Aligarh, serves as the president of the Law Society. Prof. Shakeel Ahmad is currently serving in this role.

== Previous officers ==
Mohammad Shafi Qureshi, subsequently Governor of Uttar Pradesh, served as secretary of the Law Society in 1953. Arif Jwadder held the position of Secretary for the 2013–14 session. Mr. Aqa Raza served as the vice-president of the Law Society during the 2015-2016 academic session and as editor of the Aligarh Law Society Review during the 2014-15 academic session.

Mr. Ali Faran Gulrez served as editor of the Aligarh Law Society Review for the 2017–18 session; the journal was published after a gap of approximately 45 years, following its last issue in 1971. Mr. Piyush Chawla served as vice-president for 2018–19 session, while Mr. Faham Ahmad Khan served as secretary during the same period. Mr. Abdullah Samdani served as the secretary for the 2019–20 session.

Mr. Akash Varshney served as the vice-president for the 2022-23 session, and Mr. Shoaib Akhtar served as secretary during the same academic year. Mr. Hammad Khan served as the Hon'ble Secretary of the Law Society for the academic session 2024-25. For the 2025-26 session, Mr. Shahid Ali Siddiqui is serving as vice-president of the Law Society, and Ms. Princi Bharadwaj is serving as secretary. Mr. Hammad Khan is currently serving as the Hon'ble Vice President of the Law Society for the academic session 2026-27.

== Publications and activities ==
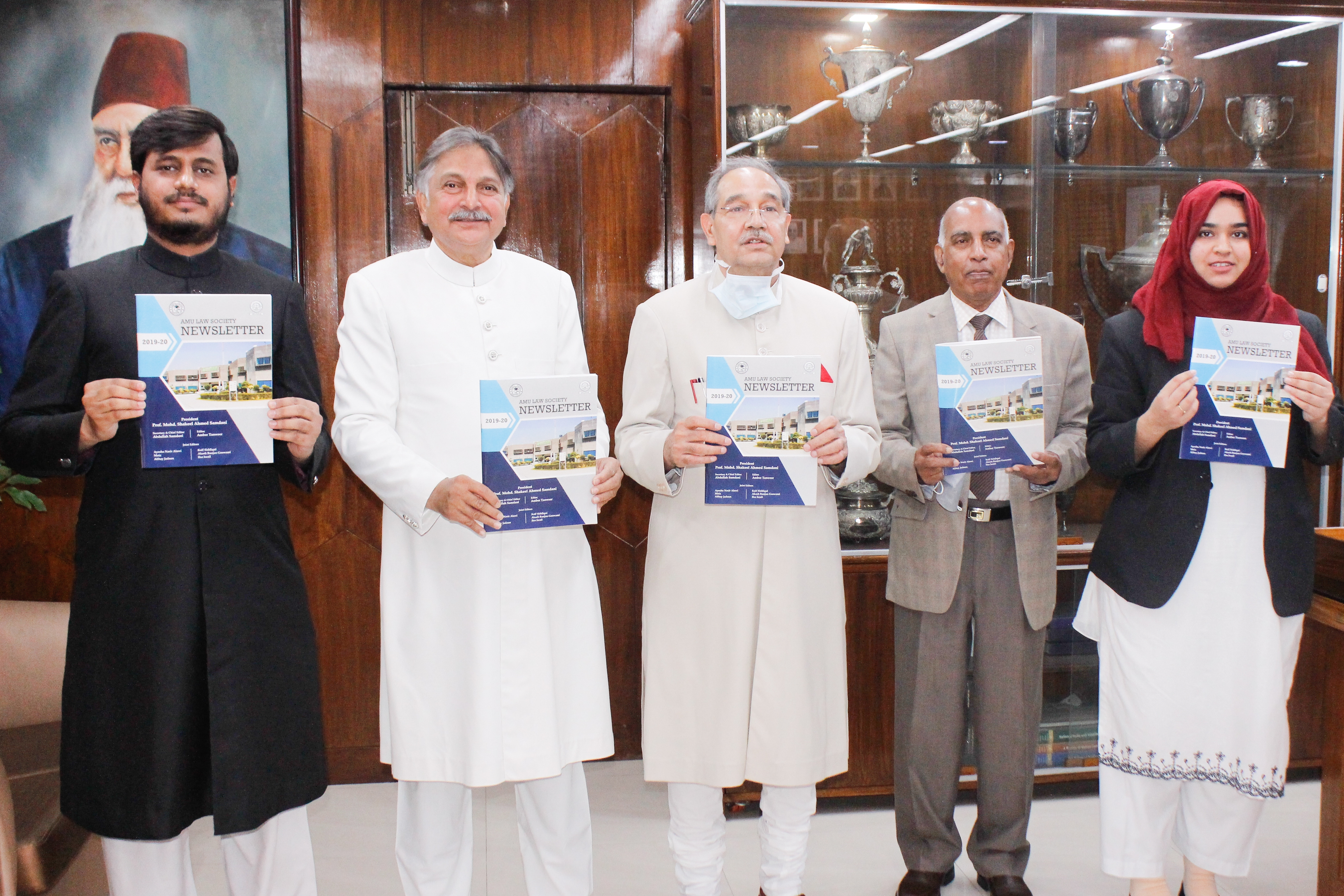
Prof. Tariq Mansoor (VC, AMU) releasing the AMU Law Society Newsletter 2020 along with Prof. Shakeel Ahmed Samdani (Dean and President), Abdullah Samdani (Secretary and Chief Editor) and Ilsa Israil (Joint Editor)

The AMU Law Society Review, a wholly student-reviewed Journal, is published every academic session.

AMU Law Society Newsletter is also published, providing a detailed report of all the events which were held throughout the year in the faculty. It also gives a platform to the students to express their experiences and opinions. The main objective behind the newsletter is to disseminate knowledge relating to contemporary legal issues. The newsletter was started in the year 2018 by Faran Gulrez and Abdullah Samdani. Since 2019, Prof. Tariq Mansoor, Honourable Vice Chancellor approved the publication of this Newsletter annually.

In the year 2020, the Newsletter was published under the guidance of Prof. Shakeel Ahmed Samdani, dean, Faculty of Law and president, Law Society, chief editorship of Abdullah Samdani, secretary, Law Society and Amber Tanweer, editor, AMU Law Society Review.

The society organises various events, including the law festival "Gavel's Buzz", international conferences, symposia on topics including health laws during the COVID-19 pandemic, and moot courts.

== See also ==
- Aligarh Muslim University
- Faculty of Law, Aligarh Muslim University
