= Chanakya National Law University =

National law university in Patna, Bihar, India

Coordinates: 25.5938°N 85.1325°E

- Motto: Gyandhanam Mahaddhanam
- Motto in English: Knowledge is the greatest wealth
- Type: Government
- Established: 2006; 20 years ago
- Affiliations: BCI, UGC
- Chancellor: Chief Justice of the Patna High Court
- Vice-Chancellor: Dr. Faizan Mustafa
- Location: Patna, Bihar, India
- Campus: Residential
- Website: www.cnlu.ac.in

Chanakya National Law University (CNLU) is a public law school and a National Law University in Patna, Bihar, India. It was established in 2006 by the Government of Bihar (Bihar Act 24 of 2006) as a public university dedicated to the field of legal education. The Chief Justice of Patna High Court is the ex officio chancellor of the university. It is one of the autonomous law schools in India. The campus is situated right near the heart of the city in the Mithapur area and has an area of approximately 18 Acres. The university offers five-year integrated courses, with admission based on the Common Law Admission Test.

== History ==
The university came into being on 15 August 2006 under the guidance of its vice-chancellor/pro-chancellor, Prof. Dr. A. Lakshminath, former dean and registrar, NALSAR University of Law, Hyderabad, HRD Principal Secretary Madan Mohan Jha, a 1977 batch IAS and Registrar(I/C) Vijay Kumar Himanshu Dy. Director of Higher education, HRD, Government of Bihar. CNLU was established under the Chanakya National Law University Act, 2006 (Bihar Act No. 24 of 2006) and included in section 2(f) & 12(B) of the U.G.C. Act, 1956. It has its jurisdiction over the whole state of Bihar.

== Administration ==
Heading the administration of the university are:

- Chancellor: Chief Justice of the Patna High Court.
- Vice Chancellor: Dr. Faizan Mustafa
- Registrar(I/C): Dr. SP Singh

== Academics ==
=== Academic programmes ===
CNLU offers a five-year integrated course into two following streams namely, B.A., LL.B(Hons), B.B.A, through a nationwide exam Common Law Admissions Test which is taken by approximately by upwards of 80,000 students every year. A total of 140 seats are offered for admission out of which 10 seats are reserved for NRI and 10 for Foreign Nationals. CNLU follows a credit-based elective system, with certain mandatory courses, which requires students to earn 200 credits over a period of five years to earn the degree.

CNLU offers one-year post-graduate LL.M program. Admission to the total 40 seats for LL.M course is provided through the Entrance Test conducted by the university.

=== Journals published ===
- CNLU Law Journal
- JAIRIPA
- The Chanakya Law Review

== Student life ==
=== Mooting Committee ===
The students of the CNLU has participated in some of the International and National Moots court competition. The students have brought laurels to the university.

- 28th Bar Council of India Moot, 2012 organized by National Law University, Delhi: Adjudged as Winners.

=== Cultural Committee ===
The committees are reconstituted every year through student elections.

=== Jeevatva (The CNLU Fest) ===
CNLU annual fest named JEEVATVA is being organised on 14–16 February. Students from many colleges across India have participated in this fest. It includes cultural, sports and academic events.

=== Debating ===
The University has had a long culture of debating and has participated in NLSIU Bangalore Debate, Mukerji Memorial Debate, etc. It has also been organizing its own parliamentary debate speculated to be one of the largest debating events in eastern India. CNLU also organised the first grand-scale Model United Nations event in Bihar.

=== CNLU Legal Aid Society ===
This society works for providing legal aid and awareness. This society basically helps people who are economically backward by helping them in their litigation. Programmes are organized by this society to make people aware of their rights and duties. It has worked in collaboration with NGOs like 'Bal Sakha' and 'Aman'.The society has organized its first National Legal Aid Fest Vidhikta consisting of which has witnessed the participation of various premier law schools and other different colleges based all over India.

CNLU has an active Increasing Diversity by Increasing Access (IDIA) chapter which trains underprivileged students for the law entrance exam CLAT.

== Sports ==
Sports facilities like volleyball, basketball, soccer, badminton, table tennis and cricket are available on the campus.

=== Chanakya Premier League ===
Chanakya Premier League (CPL) is organised every year on the lines of Indian Premier League. The students and the faculty members are allowed to own a team; they bid for the players in the auctions.

== See also ==
- Legal education in India
- NALSAR University of Law
- Autonomous law schools in India
- List of law schools in India
