= B. S. Chimni =

Indian legal scholar

B. S. Chimni (Bhupinder S. Chimni) is a legal scholar and academic who is presently distinguished professor of international law member at Jindal Global Law School. His areas of expertise include international law, international trade law and international refugee law. He has been chairperson of the Centre for International Legal Studies at Jawaharlal Nehru University, New Delhi. He had a 2 1/2-year stint as vice chancellor of the West Bengal National University of Juridical Sciences. He has been a visiting professor at the International Center for Comparative Law and Politics, Tokyo University, a Fulbright Visiting Scholar at Harvard Law School, visiting fellow at Max Planck Institute for Comparative Public Law and International Law, Heidelberg, and a visiting scholar at the Refugee Studies Center, York University, Canada.

He served as a Member of Parliament In the Upper house (Rajya Sabha) As an Independent party member from 1996-2004.

He served as a member of the Academic Advisory Committee of the Office of the United Nations High Commissioner for Refugees for the period from 1996 to 2000. He is on the editorial board of several national and international journals like Indian Journal of International Law, International Studies, International Refugee Studies, Georgetown Immigration Law Journal and Refugee Survey Quarterly. Chimni is part of a group of scholars who self-identify as the Third World Approaches to International Law (TWAIL) scholars.

== Early life and education ==
BS Chimni has his education in India. He had his LL.B. degree from Panjab University, LL.M. from Bombay University and PhD from Jawaharlal Nehru University. He retired from Jawaharlal Nehru University on 31 June 2017.

He is an associate member of Institut de Droit International since 2011, and a Member of the Academic Council of the Institute for Global Law and Policy, Harvard Law School. He was Fellow in Nantes Institute for Advanced Study from October 2018 to March 2019 working on 'Pathways to the Future: International Law and Global Justice'. Since 2019, he is Distinguished Professor of International Law and Member of the Law School Doctoral Committee at Jindal Global Law School, O.P. Jindal Global University.

== Lectures ==
He also gave the keynote lecture at the British Academy as part of The Refugee Problem & the Problem of Refugees Conference.

In 1999 he delivered the first Barbara Harrell-Bond Lecture at Refugee Studies Centre, Oxford University. In March 2006, at the centennial annual meeting of the American Society of International Law, Chimni delivered the Grotius Lectures, titled "A Just World Under Law: a View from the South." In January 2008, he gave the State of Forced Migration Studies address at the 11th biennial conference of the International Association for the Study of Forced Migration in Cairo. In February 2010, he delivered lecture to the Asian–African Legal Consultative Organization (AALCO)Training Program: Basic Course on the World Trade Organization with his JNU's centre and school colleagues, such as Dr. V. G. Hegde, Dr. Archna Negi at AALCO Permanent Headquarters, New Delhi, India.

== Publications ==
=== Research Papers ===
- "Global Administrative Law: Winners & Losers",International Law & Justice Working Papers
- "Cooption and Resistance: Two Sides of Global Administrative Law", International Law & Justice Working Papers No.2005/16. Institute for International Law & Justice, New York University School of Law. 2005.
- "The Law and Politics of Regional Solution of the Refugee Problem: The Case of South Asia", RCSS Policy Studies 4. Colombo, 1997.

=== Articles ===
- "The World Trade Organization, Democracy & Development: A View from the South", Journal of World Trade(2006).
- "International Institutions Today: An Imperial Global State in the Making", European Journal of International Law, Vol. 15, No. 1 (2004).
- "An Outline of a Marxist Course on Public International Law", Leiden Journal of International Law, Vol.17, No.1 (2004) pp. 1–30.
- "The Reform of the International Refugee Regime: A Dialogic Model", Journal of Refugee Studies, Vol.14, No.2 (2001) pp. 151–161.
- "Third World Approaches to International Law & Individual Responsibility in Internal Conflict", Chinese Journal of International Law, Vol.2(1) (2003) p. 77 (Co-authored with Antony Anghie)
- "First Harrell-Bond Lecture: 'Globalization, Humanitarianism and the Erosion of Refugee Protection'", Journal of Refugee Studies, vol.13, no.3 (2000) pp. 243–64.
- "Marxism and International Law: A Contemporary Analysis", Economic and Political Weekly, 6 February 1999, pp. 337–49.
- "WTO and Environment: The Shrimp-Turtle and EU-Hormone Cases", Economic and Political Weekly, 13 May 2000, pp. 1752–62.
- "WTO and Environment: Legitimisation of Unilateral Trade Sanctions", Economic & Political Weekly, Sept. 2002, p. 133.
- "The Geopolitics of Refugee Studies: A View from the South", Journal of Refugee Studies, Vol.11, No.4 (1998) pp. 354–374
- "International Institutions Today: An Imperial Global State in the Making", European Journal of International Law, vol.15, (2004), pp. 1–39.
- "The Self, Modern Civilization and International Law: Learning from Mohandas Karamchand Gandhi’s Hind Swaraj", European Journal of International Law, vol.23, No. 4 (2012) pp. 1159–1173.

=== Contributions ===
- "Outside the bounds of citizenship: the status of aliens, illegal migrants and refugees in India" in Civil Society, Public Sphere and Citizenship : Dialogues and Perceptions. Edited by Rajeev Bhargava and Helmut Reifeld. New Delhi: Sage, 2005.
- "The International Law of Humanitarian Intervention", in State Sovereignty in the 21st Century. Institute of Defense Studies & Analysis, New Delhi. pp. 103–129
- "The Global Refugee Problem in the 21st Century and the Emerging Security Paradigm", in Legal Visions of the 21st Century: Essays in Honour of Judge Weeramantry. The Hague, Kluwer Law International, 1997. pp. 283–289
- "Post-conflict peace-building and the return of refugees: Concepts, practices and institutions" in Refugees and Forced Displacement: International Security, Human Vulnerability, and the State. Edited by Edward Newman & Joanne van Selm. United Nations University Press, 2003.
- "Development and Migration" in Migration & International Legal Norms. Edited by T. Alexander Aleinikoff & Vincent Chetail. Cambridge University Press, 2003.
- "Legitimating the international rule of law" in The Cambridge Companion to International Law. Edited by James Crawford and Martti Koskenniemi. Cambridge University Press, 2012. pp. 290–308

=== Books ===
- The Third World & International Legal Order: Law, Politics & Globalisation (co-edited with Antony Anghie, Karen Mickelson & Obiora Okafor, Kluwer Law International, 2003).
- International Refugee Law: A Reader. New Delhi: Sage, 2000.
- International Law and World Order: A Critique of Contemporary Approaches. New Delhi: Sage, 1993.
- International Commodity Agreements: A Legal Study. London: Croom Helm, 1987.
- *International Law and World Order: A Critique of Contemporary Approaches (Cambridge University Press, Cambridge, 2017) 2nd edition
- Chimni B.S. and Malvarappu, Siddharth eds., International Relations: Essays for the Global South (New Delhi: Pearson 2012)

Preceded by N. R. Madhava Menon	Vice Chancellor of NUJS; 2003–2006	Succeeded by Mahendra P Singh
