= Faculty of Law, Aligarh Muslim University =

- Motto: He taught man what he knew not
- Established: 1891; 135 years ago
- School type: Law School
- Location: Aligarh, India
- Website: amu.ac.in/faculties/faculty-of-law

The Faculty of Law, Aligarh Muslim University is the law school of the Aligarh Muslim University which has a history of over 100 years of teaching and writing law. Law classes were inaugurated by Justice Douglas Straight on 29 December 1891.

In 2014, the faculty was listed on number 6 in India's best law colleges list compiled by India Today which it retained in 2015 and 2016 as well.

== Academics ==
=== Scholar-in-Residence ===
The Aligarh Muslim University has appointed N. R. Madhava Menon, father of modern Indian legal education as Scholar-in-Residence in the Department of Law. Prof. Menon was the first PhD produced by the Department of Law at AMU. He is known as one of the long-serving, popular legal educators of the country, an institution-builder, the architect of the five-year integrated LL.B. programme and the Founder Vice-Chancellor of two of the leading law universities of India (National Law School of India University, Bangalore and National University of Juridical Sciences, Kolkata). Prof. (Dr.) N.R. Madhava Menon has endeavoured for nearly five decades to put Indian legal education at par with those of the developed countries.

Menon has also been:

- A Teacher at Aligarh Muslim University, Faculty of Law.
- Member of the Law Commission of India,
- Member of several expert committees including Legal Aid Committee(1973), The Civil Services Examination Reform Committee (2000–2001) and Criminal Justice Reform (2002–2003), appointed by the Government of India.

=== Memorandum of Understanding ===
One of the greatest achievements of the Faculty of law is the signing of Memorandum of Understanding (MoU) between AMU and George Washington University, USA, one of the world's leading higher educational Institutions in law, on 17 February 2010. This remarkable venture facilitates the faculty members and Ph.D. or SJD candidates from each other institutions to participate for a semester or two as visiting scholars for the purpose of conducting research.

=== Publications ===
The department publishes Aligarh Law Journal.

== Programs Offered ==
The Faculty of Law is currently offering the following courses:

- Five years integrated Bachelor of Arts & Bachelor of Laws(B.A., LL.B.),
- Two Year Master of Laws (LL.M.),
- Doctor of Philosophy (Ph.D.), and
- Diploma courses

== Facilities ==
=== Law faculty building ===
Faculty of law was earlier situated at Sir Syed Hall which was later on shifted to the present commerce faculty. At present the faculty is situated at Qila road building of the university.

=== Seminar library ===
Seminar law library is the oldest seminar library of the faculty. It has around journals and books dating back to 19th century. It has approximately 35000 books including text books, reference books and research books apart from 35 National Journals and 15 International Journals.

=== Legal aid clinic and mediation centre ===
Faculty maintains this centre to provide legal guidance and advisement to indigent and poverty ridden litigants by associating students under the supervision and guidance of committed law teachers together with local judiciary.

== Law Society ==
The Law Society was founded in 1894 as a non-profit student organization. It has a long traditional character of uplifting its students' participation and performance in legal academia and practice. The Dean, Faculty of Law is the President of the Law Society.

The Society is committed to promoting the growth of the students in both academic and cultural fields. It provides a platform for the students to polish their skills in Mooting, Legal Research, Legal Writing, Debating, participating in quiz competitions, etc. It also provides an environment for constructive recreation of the students by organizing fests, reading clubs, etc. The Society aims to establish networks with legal professional forums and professionals in order to build the presence of AMU Law graduates in the legal arena. The endeavor is to instill in law students an excellent expression of thought on paper and to provide them a space for growth, improvement, and better learning. Ms. Ayesha Nasir Alavi served as the Secretary of the Law Society of the session 2020–21. Mr. Akash Varshney served as its vice president for the session 2022–2023. Mr. Hammad Khan is currently serving as the hon'ble Secretary of the Law Society for the academic year 2024–25.

== Dr. Ambedkar Chair of Legal Studies & Research ==
The sub-committee on education set up for centenary celebrations Dr. Bhimrao Ramji Ambedkar, in one of its recommendations in the year 1992, suggested for setting up Dr. Ambedkar Chair in different disciplines of different institutions/ universities. In pursuance of the recommendation and followed by the decision, Dr. Ambedkar Chair were set up for undertaking study and research programmes on various aspects of the philosophy, thoughts, ideologies, missions and ideals of Dr. B.R. Ambedkar, by Dr. Ambedkar Foundation, the Ministry of Social Justice and Empowerment, Government of India, New Delhi. Ambedkar chair was created by Dr. Ambedkar Foundation, Ministry of Social Justice and Empowerment, Govt. of India, New Delhi in 1992. Professor Mohammad Shabbir is the founding director of the chair.

The chair to its credit, publishes its well reputed legal journal entitled Quest for Justice regularly since 2005–06.

It also organizes National Essay Competition every year to commemorate the birth anniversary of Dr. BR Ambedkar on behalf of government of India.

== Rankings ==
University rankings

Law – India
- NIRF (2022): 12

The Faculty of Law, Aligarh Muslim University was ranked 12 among law schools in India by the National Institutional Ranking Framework (NIRF) in 2022.

== Notable alumni ==
The following notable individuals have read law at the Faculty of Law, Aligarh.

=== Actors and entertainers ===
- Khwaja Ahmad Abbas, Urdu/Hindi movie scriptwriter and director, journalist

=== Jurists ===
- Justice Syed Murtaza Fazl Ali, Supreme Court of India; chief justice, J & K. High Court
- Justice Baharul Islam, Supreme Court of India (1980–1983), Chief Justice of Gauhati High Court
- Justice Ram Prakash Sethi, Supreme Court of India
- Abdul Hakeem Khan, Chief Justice of Pakistan
- Mufti Baha-ud-din Farooqi, 12th Chief Justice of the High Court of Jammu and Kashmir.
- Syed Wazir Hasan, Chief Justice of Awadh Chief Court.

=== Academics ===
- N. R. Madhava Menon
- Faizan Mustafa, Vice-Chancellor, NALSAR University of Law, Hyderabad; Founder Vice-Chancellor, National Law University, Orissa
- Tahir Mahmood
- Shakeel Ahmed Samdani

=== Administrator ===
- S M Khan
