= N. R. Madhava Menon =

Indian legal scholar

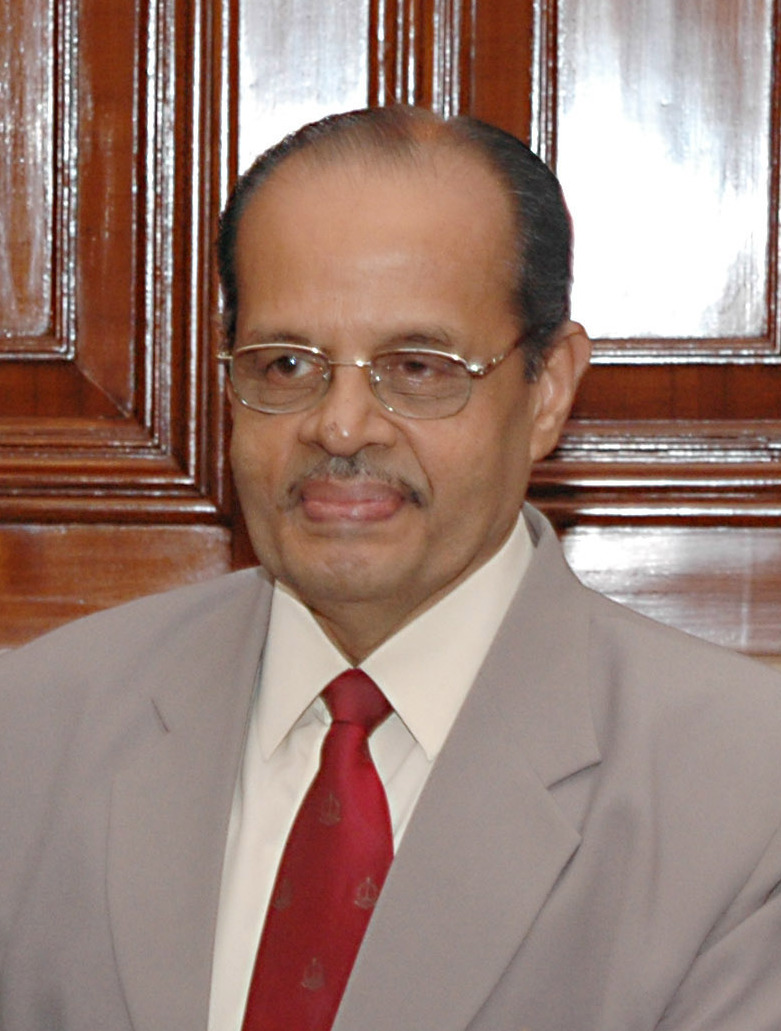
- Menon in August 2007
- Born: 4 May 1935; Trivandrum, Travancore, British India(present-day Thiruvananthapuram, Kerala, India)
- Died: May 8, 2019 (aged 84); Thiruvananthapuram, Kerala, India
- Education: University of Kerala (BSc, LLB); Panjab University (MA); Aligarh Muslim University (PhD)
- Occupations: Legal educator, lawyer
- Years active: 1956–2019
- Known for: Founding the National Law School of India University and the West Bengal National University of Juridical Sciences
- Spouse: Rema Devi
- Children: Ramakrishna Menon
- Parent(s): Ramakrishna Menon (Father); Bhavani Amma (Mother)
- Awards: Padma Bhushan (2020) Padma Shri (2003); Living Legend of Law; Plaque of Honour; Rotary Club Award for Vocational Excellence

Signature
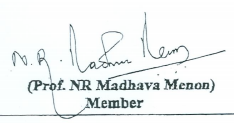

Neelakanta Ramakrishna Madhava Menon (4 May 1935 – 8 May 2019) was an Indian civil servant, lawyer and legal educator, considered by many as the father of modern legal education in India. He is the founder of National Law Universities system and first director of the National Law School of India University (NLSIU) and the National Judicial Academy, Bhopal and the founder-vice-chancellor of the West Bengal National University of Juridical Sciences (NUJS). He has also served as Chairman of Indian Statistical Institute from 2002 to 2003.

Menon was awarded the Padma Shri in 2003 and Padma Bhushan in 2020 by the Government of India.

He was a member of the Law Commission of India and also member of several expert Committees including on Legal Aid (1973), Civil Services Examination Reform (2000-2001), and Criminal Justice Reform (2002-2003), Police Act Drafting Committee (2005-2006) and the Committee on Draft National Policy on Criminal Justice (2006-2007) and Committee on Restructuring of Higher Education in India appointed by the Government of India. He was a Central Secretariat Service officer. The new academic block of NLSIU is named after him.

== Biography ==
Menon was born on 4 May 1935 at Trivandrum, Kerala in a middle-class Nair family to Bhavani Amma and Ramakrishna Menon as the fourth of their six children. He was named after his maternal uncle. His father, a law graduate and a revenue officer working for the Travancore Corporation, died due to typhoid, when Menon was two years old and he was brought up by his mother, with the assistance of her brothers and sisters. His mother took up a job as a clerk at Travancore Corporation to bring up Appu, as he was known at home, and his three elder sisters and one younger brother; another one of his younger brothers died in childhood.

Menon schooling was at Sreemoolavilasam Government High School, Thiruvananthapuram from where he passed matriculation in 1949 and completed the pre-university course in 1950, when the erstwhile two-year course was realigned as a truncated one-year course. His graduate studies were at S. D. College, Alappuzha from where he passed with a BSc in zoology in 1953. He also passed the Hindi Visharad course conducted by the Dakshin Bharat Hindi Prachar Sabha simultaneously with his graduate studies. He continued his studies at Government Law College, Ernakulam, but shifted to Government Law College, Thiruvananthapuram when the college was restarted in the capital city in 1953 and was the student editor of the college magazine in 1954–55. He passed the law course (BL) in 1955.

Menon died on 8 May 2019, four days after his 84th birthday, at Thiruvananthapuram, reportedly after battling liver cancer.

== Career ==
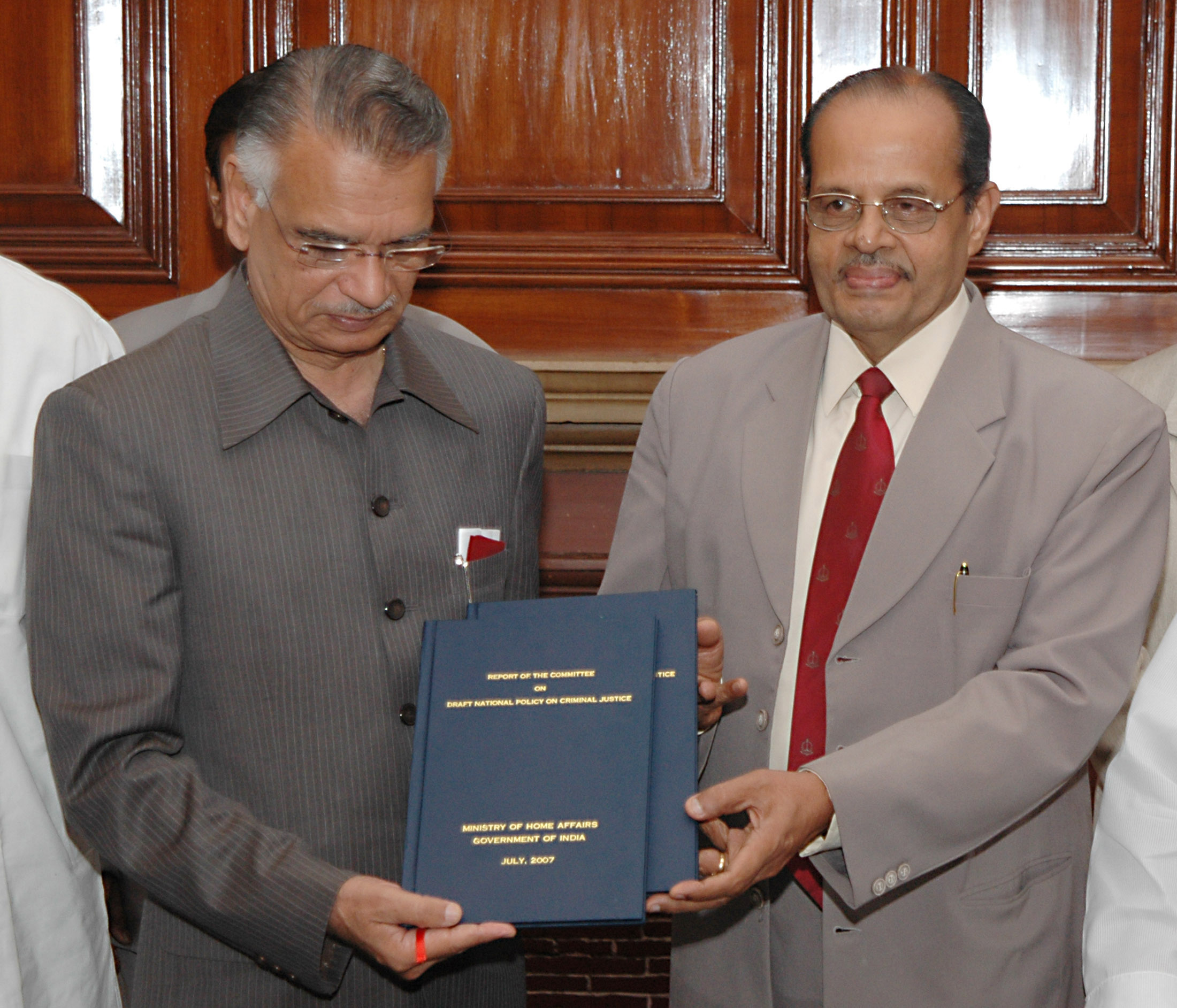
N.R Madhava Menon presenting report of the committee on draft National Policy on Criminal Justice to the 25th Home Minister of India Shivraj Patil in New Delhi 2007.

=== Law and civil service ===
Menon started his career in 1955, as an apprentice to a locally known lawyer, V. Nagappan Nair, and assisted him for thirteen months. The next year, in 1956, he registered at the High Court of Kerala, in Ernakulam, as a lawyer and started practice under advocate Poovanpallil Neelakandan Pillai at the district court in Thiruvananthapuram. One year later, Menon appeared for the Civil Services Examination and got placed into the Central Secretariat Service in New Delhi. On the advice of his teacher and mentor, A.T. Markose, the first director of the Indian Law Institute and the author of Judicial Control of Administrative Action in India, he took up the job at Central Secretariat in New Delhi.

While working at the secretariat, Menon continued his studies at Campus College located at Gole Market, affiliated to Punjab University and secured a post graduate degree (MA) in political science with distinction, in 1960. Afterwards, Menon joined Faculty of Law, Aligarh Muslim University for further studies in law and passed the master's degree in law (LLM) and, obtaining a UGC scholarship, continued research on the topic, White Collar Crime. Teaching and doing part-time job as the warden of the Sir Syed Hall at the university, he completed his research to obtain PhD in 1965, relocated to Delhi, and married Rema Devi, the same year. He is the first PhD of Faculty of Law, Aligarh Muslim University. He was also the first non- Muslim to be appointed warden of a hostel at Aligarh Muslim University.

=== Academic ===
In 1968, Menon joined his alma mater, Faculty of Law, Aligarh Muslim University, as a professor. The subsequent move was again to University of Delhi as a reader in the faculty of law, and later as the professor of the department. During his stint there, he received a Fulbright Scholarship from the American Council of Learned Societies and had the opportunity to present a paper on "Legal Aid" at Berkeley, California. He was a member of the Delhi University panel which liaised with universities from the United States such as Harvard, Columbia, Michigan and Yale. It was during this period that Menon published his first book, Law Relating to Government Control Over Private Enterprise, co-authored by his colleague, G. Narasimhaswamy, published through Eastern Law Book Company. Soon, his second book, Law and Property was published by N. M. Tripathy Co. He also published an article, co-authored by Clarke Cunningham in the Michigan Law Review.

Menon, while working in Delhi, is known to have organized the annual conference of the All India Law Teachers Association, in 1972, where he was elected as the Secretary General of the association. He has served as a member of the Committee for Implementing Legal Aid Schemes (CILAS), which was formed under the chairmanship of V. R. Krishna Iyer, by the Indira Gandhi government, in connection with the Garibi Hatao programme. He has also served as the secretary of the Bar Council of India Trust. During an interlude, he worked as the principal of the Government Law College, Pondicherry. When the Bar Council of India decided to establish a new law school in early 1980s, Menon's services were sought and he is known to have set up the Bangalore-based National Law School of India University (NLSIU) with a US$150,000 government grant. The school was the first in India to use the Harvard Law School's case study method, which later became the mainstream form of legal education in India. Menon worked at NLSIU for twelve years as the director, moving after the institution gained university status.

In 1998, Menon was invited by the Government of West Bengal under Jyoti Basu to set up the West Bengal National University of Juridical Sciences (NUJS) on the lines of the Bangalore initiative. As the first vice-chancellor, he is known to have developed its infrastructure and educational curriculum and held the post till 2003, when the Supreme Court of India asked him to take over the responsibility as the first director of the newly formed National Judicial Academy a training centre for judges where he worked till his retirement in 2006.

== Post-retirement positions ==
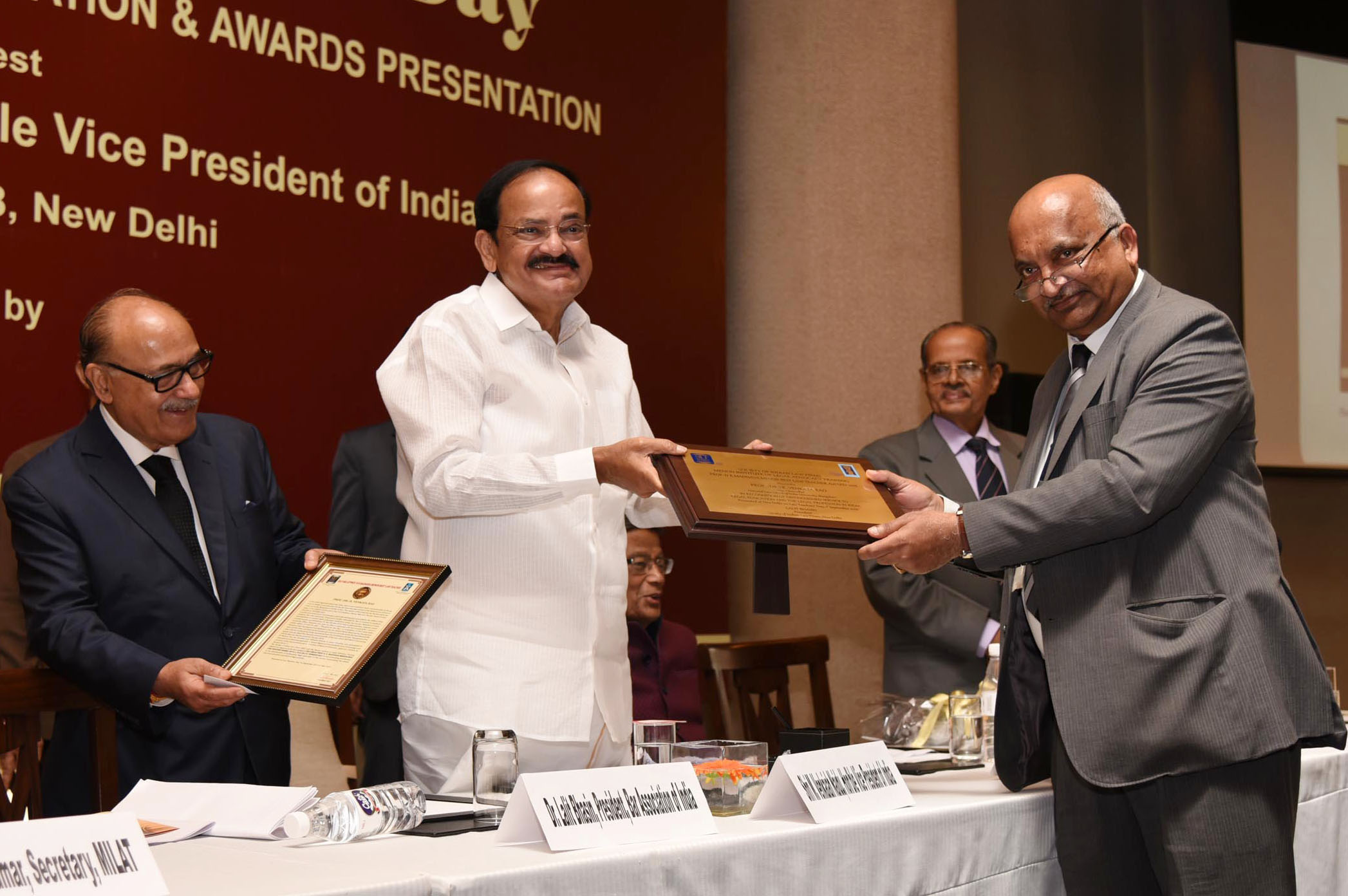
13th Vice President of India Venkaiah Naidu presenting Professor N.R. Madhava Menon, Best Law Teacher Award for 2018 to Prof. R. Venkata Rao, Vice Chancellor of National Law School of India.

After retiring from active government service in 2006, Menon was appointed by the Union Government as a member of the Commission on Centre-State Relations, a position he held till 2010. He also served as the Chairman of the Indian Statistical Institute, Kolkata, and later, as the Chairman of the Centre for Development Studies, Thiruvananthapuram. He headed the central government committee constituted to draft the National Policy on Criminal Justice and served as the Commission on Equal Opportunity. He was a member of Law Commission of India and was a member of the Committee on Restructuring of Higher Education in India as well as the Criminal Justice Reform committee. Later, Madhava Menon headed a Commission constituted as per a Supreme Court order of April 2014 to submit recommendations on government advertisements, on which report was submitted in October 2014.

Menon was a member of the Board of Governors of the International Organization of Judicial Trainers (IOJT), was an advisor to the Commonwealth Judicial Education Institute, Canada. He held the chair of the International Bar Association on Continuing Legal Education based at NLSIU and Menon Institute of Legal Advocacy Training (MILAT), a non governmental organization founded by him in Thiruvananthapuram. He was the Chancellor of the Guru Ghasidas University, Bilaspur, India and a member of the Centre for Development Studies, Nirma University, Ahmedabad, Dr. Ambedkar University of Social Sciences, Delhi, NALSAR University of Law, Hyderabad, National Law University, Jodhpur, National Law University Odisha and the School of Law, Indira Gandhi National Open University.

Menon lived in Thiruvananthapuram with his wife, Rema Devi. The couple had a son, Ramakrishna, an engineer based in Bengaluru.

== Awards and recognition ==
Menon, the president of the Bar Council of India during the period, 1994–98, was conferred the Living Legend of Law Award by the International Bar Association in 1994. He was also a recipient of the Rotary Club Award for Vocational Excellence and the Plaque of Honour from the Bar Council of India. He received the degree of Doctor of Law (Honoris Causa) from the National Law School of India University in 2001. He was a Fellow of the American Council of Learned Societies and Columbia University. The Government of India included Menon, in 2003, in the Republic Day honours list, for the civilian award of Padma Shri. He was posthumously awarded Padma Bhushan in 2020 for his contribution in the field of Public Affairs.

== Legacy ==
Menon's contributions are known behind the establishment of two law schools in India viz. National Law School of India University, Bengaluru, and the West Bengal National University of Juridical Sciences, Kolkata. He is credited with the conceptualisation of the five-year integrated LLB course, in place of the earlier three-year non-integrated course. His Socratic method of teaching, involving participation of law students in legal clinics, is considered by many as an innovation. Menon Institute of Legal Advocacy Training (MILAT), a non-governmental organisation founded by him, is involved in promoting human rights values and judicial reforms and conducting advance training programs for lawyers.

=== Scholarships ===
NLSIU created N R Madhava Menon Doctoral Scholarship in 2020.

== Books, research papers and journals ==
Menon is the author of several books, research papers and journals. A complete list of papers, books and journals authored by him is given below.

=== Books ===
- Rule of Law in a Free Society (Publisher: Oxford University Press; ISBN 9780195694420)
- Nehru and Indian Constitutionalism (Publisher: Indus Source Books; ISBN 9788188569793)
- Reflections on Legal and Judicial Education (Publisher: Universal Law Publishing; ISBN 9788175348172)
- A Handbook on Clinical Legal Education (Publisher: Eastern Book Company; ISBN 9788170126317)

=== Research papers ===
- The Transformation of Indian Legal Education- A Blue Paper (Publisher: Harvard Law School) Link

Menon wrote his autobiography, The Story of a Law Teacher: Turning Point, besides publishing several books, articles and monographs on a variety of legal subjects. His notable works include:

- Law and Poverty
- Law and Ethics
- Action Plan on Recommendations of the National Committee on Women Prisoners
- Legal Aid and Legal Education
- Population and Law: Justics for All
- Education and Public Health
- A Training Manual for Police on Human Rights
- Feminism and Law
- Clinical Legal Education
- Law Relating to Government Control Over Private Enterprise
- Documents and Court Opinions on Bhopal Gas Leak Disaster Case

== Books featuring Menon ==
- Turning Point - The Story of a Law Teacher : Memoirs of Padmashree Prof. N.R. Madhava Menon (Publisher: Universal Law Publishing Company; ISBN 9788175348189)

== See also ==
- National Law School of India University
- National Judicial Academy
- West Bengal National University of Juridical Sciences
- Indian Statistical Institute
- Centre for Development Studies
- Law Commission of India

Academic offices
Preceded by Bimal Jalan	Chairman of Indian Statistical Institute; 2002 to 2003	Succeeded by Pranab Mukherjee
Preceded by	1st Vice Chancellor of National Law School of India University	Succeeded by
Preceded by	Vice Chancellor of West Bengal National University of Juridical Sciences	Succeeded by
Preceded by	1st Director of National Judicial Academy	Succeeded by
Preceded by	Chancellor of Guru Ghasidas Vishwavidyalaya	Succeeded by
