= Sagarika Ghose =

Indian writer and journalist (born 1964)

Member of Parliament, Rajya Sabha
- Incumbent
- Assumed office 3 April 2024
- Preceded by: Abir Biswas
- Constituency: West Bengal

Personal details
- Born: 8 November 1964 (age 62) New Delhi, India
- Party: Trinamool Congress (since 2024) (until 2026); Mamata All India Trinamool Congress (from 2026)
- Parent: Bhaskar Ghose (father)
- Relatives: Dilip Sardesai (father-in-law); Arundhati Ghose (aunt); Ruma Pal (aunt); Sanjay Ghose (cousin)
- Education: St. Stephen's College, Delhi (BA); Magdalen College, Oxford (BA); St Antony's College, Oxford (MPhil)
- Occupation: Journalist; Politician
- Years active: 1991-present
- Notable work: Indira: India's Most Powerful Prime Minister
- Spouse: Rajdeep Sardesai (m. 1994)

Sagarika Ghose (Bengali pronunciation: [ʃagorika ɡʱoʃ]; born 8 November 1964) is an Indian Member of Parliament, journalist, columnist and author. She has been a journalist since 1991 and has worked at The Times of India, Outlook and The Indian Express. She was a prime time anchor for BBC World on Question Time India and on the news network CNN-IBN, also being the deputy editor for the latter. Ghose has won several awards in journalism and is the author of two novels, as well as the biography of Indira Gandhi, Indira: India's Most Powerful Prime Minister. She worked as Consulting Editor of The Times of India from 2014 to 2020. In 2022, her biography of former Indian Prime Minister, Atal Bihari Vajpayee was released.

== Education ==
Ghose did her schooling at Delhi Public School, R. K. Puram, Delhi, and completed her B.A. degree in History from St. Stephen's College, Delhi. A recipient of the Rhodes Scholarship in 1987, she has a B.A. in Modern History from Magdalen College, Oxford, and an M.Phil. from St Antony's College, Oxford.

== Career ==
Since 1991, she has worked as a journalist at The Times Of India, Outlook magazine and The Indian Express and was deputy editor and prime time anchor on the news network CNN-IBN. Ghose resigned as deputy editor of CNN-IBN in July 2014.

In 2004, she became the first woman to host Question Time India. She was the deputy editor and a prime time anchor on the news network CNN-IBN. Her writings and broadcasts have earned her popularity and also criticism from right-wing viewers.

Ghose's Twitter interview with Arvind Kejriwal of the Aam Aadmi Party in 2013 became the first instance of an Indian politician giving a social media interview prior to the polls. Ghose resigned from CNN-IBN on 5 July 2014 after the network was acquired by the Mukesh Ambani-led Reliance Industries ltd. She was deputy editor of the channel.

== Awards and honors ==
Her show Question Time Didi, an audience based interaction with West Bengal chief minister Mamata Banerjee and students, from which Banerjee famously stormed out mid-way, received the NT Award for Best Public Debate Show in 2013. She was awarded the Gr8-ITA award for Excellence in Journalism in 2009. Ghose was awarded an Excellence in Journalism Award (Aparajita Award) from FICCI Ladies Organisation in 2005. In 2012 she received the CF Andrews Award for Distinguished Alumnus from St Stephen's College. In 2013, Ghose received the ITA Best Anchor Award from the Indian Television Academy (ITA). In 2014, The Rhodes Project included Ghose on a list of 13 famous women Rhodes Scholars. In 2017 Ghose was awarded the C.H.Mohammed Koya National Award for journalism.

== Published works ==
Ghose is the author of two novels, The Gin Drinkers, published in 1998, and Blind Faith, in 2004. The Gin Drinkers was also published in the Netherlands. Ghose also published a biography of former Indian Prime Minister Indira Gandhi, Indira: India's Most Powerful Prime Minister (Juggernaut Books) in 2017. The biography is slated to be made into a film. In 2022 her biography of former Indian Prime Minister, Atal Bihari Vajpayee was released.

In her 2018 non-fiction book, Why I Am A Liberal: A Manifesto For Indians Who Believe in Individual Freedom, Ghose describes herself as a liberal who believes in rule of law, limited government, robust institutions and individual liberty. Ghose propounds the thesis that although the republic of India was founded as a liberal democracy in 1947, subsequent Indian governments throughout the post-Independence period have sought to attack individual liberty and vastly increase the powers of the government, or the powers of what she calls the Indian 'Big State'.

== Personal life ==
She is the daughter of Bhaskar Ghose, formerly of the Indian Administrative Service 1960 batch, erstwhile Director General of Doordarshan, the Indian public television network. Her two aunts include Arundhati Ghose, former ambassador and diplomat and Ruma Pal, former justice of the Supreme Court of India. She is married to journalist and news anchor Rajdeep Sardesai, the son of former Indian test cricketer Dilip Sardesai. Rajdeep and Sagarika have two children, son Dr. Ishan Sardesai and daughter Tarini Sardesai, advocate. Ghose’s maternal great- grandfather was Dr K.S Ray, scion of the Teota zamindari family, who was one of Bengal’s renowned doctors and thoracic surgery pioneer, one of the founders of the Indian Medical Association and founder of the TB Hospital in Jadavpur, Kolkata.

== Political career ==
Sagarika Ghose joined the Trinamool Congress Party on 11 February 2024, and was elected as the party's candidate to the Rajya Sabha in 2024.

She frequently faces controversies due to her sharp criticism of the ruling party, Bhartiya Janata Party (BJP) and her skirmishes and sharp reactions against Election Commission of India.

== Bibliography ==
- The Gin Drinkers (1998)
- Blind Faith (2004)
- Indira: India's Most Powerful Prime Minister (2017)
- Why I Am A Liberal: A Manifesto For Indians Who Believe in Individual Freedom (2018)
- Atal Bihari Vajpayee – India's Most Loved Prime Minister (2022)
