= Indira: India's Most Powerful Prime Minister =

2017 biography by Sagarika Ghose

- Author: Sagarika Ghose
- Language: English
- Subject: Biography
- Publisher: Juggernaut Books
- Publication date: 2017
- Publication place: India
- ISBN: 978-93-86228-34-5

Indira: India's Most Powerful Prime Minister is a 2017 biography of Indira Gandhi, Indian politician and former Prime Minister of India, written by Sagarika Ghose a Rajya Sabha MP from TMC Trinamool Congress party which is part of I.N.D.I.A alliance (earlier UPA) with Indian National Congress.

The book rights were bought by Indian actress Vidya Balan and in 2017 the biography was in the process of being adapted into a web series. However, in 2022, India Today noted that the project appeared to have been called off due to the 'current political climate'.
