= Sanjoy Ghose =

Indian activist

- Ghose, c. 1997
- Born: 7 December 1959; Nagpur, Bombay State, India
- Died: 4 July 1997 (aged 37); Majuli, Assam, India
- Relatives: Bhaskar Ghose (uncle); Ruma Pal (aunt); Arundhati Ghose (aunt); Sagarika Ghose (cousin)

Sanjoy Ghose (7 December 1959 – 4 July 1997) was an Indian rural development activist known for his pioneering contributions to community health and development media. He is believed to have been killed by United Liberation Front of Asom (ULFA) militants in the river island of Majuli on the Brahmaputra river around 4 July 1997.

== Biography ==
=== Early life ===
Born in Nagpur, Ghose spent his formative years and adolescence in Mumbai, Maharashtra. His uncle was Bhaskar Ghose, a former Director General of Doordarshan. His aunts included Ruma Pal, a former Supreme Court judge, Arundhati Ghose, a former diplomat and India's permanent representative to the United Nations during the 1990s, and journalist Usha Rai. His mother, Vijaya Ghose, was the editor of the Limca Book of Records.

Educated at Cathedral and John Connon School, Ghose led the Rotary International-sponsored Interact club. His involvement in social work through the club reshaped his priorities. His father remembers him spending two nights in a Mumbai slum to understand its challenges. After school, he attended Elphinstone College in Mumbai, where he graduated in rural development and law. He also contributed to the National Service Scheme, taking students to tribal villages near the Western Ghats to witness poverty and exploitation.

In 1980, he attended the Institute of Rural Management, Anand (IRMA), in keeping with his personal commitment to work for the poorest of the poor.

=== Career ===
In 1984, he won the Inlaks Foundation scholarship for an MSc in economics from St Anne's College, Oxford. After Oxford, he returned to rural India and established the URMUL Rural Health and Development Trust in Bikaner, Rajasthan, in 1986. He later won the Hubert Humphrey fellowship and spent a year at the Johns Hopkins Bloomberg School of Public Health (1988–89). While working with the poorest, he contracted tuberculosis.

Ghose wrote extensively about his grassroot experiences with the URMUL Trust in Lunkaransar Village in Bikaner.

Recognising the potential of mainstream media to highlight rural development issues and drive change, Sanjoy launched CHARKHA on 24 October 1994 in New Delhi, with the goal of turning action into words. Its official vision is "To contribute towards building a harmonious, inclusive society empowered by knowledge."

Sanjoy Ghose with his team of social workers in Majuli island.

Through the sponsorship of Association of Voluntary Agencies for Rurul Development, North East (AVARD-NE) Sanjoy and seven colleagues set up base in Majuli island on the Brahmaputra river in April 1996. The island faced annual flooding and erosion of land. Around February 1997, he and his team mobilised around 30,000 human days of voluntary labour (shram dhan). An experimental stretch of 1.7 kilometres of land was protected from erosion, by building embankments: using only local resources and their knowledge. The following year this protected stretch of the island survived the floods.

== Death ==
A newspaper article in the Deccan Herald on 9 February 2009 claimed that "(Ghose) had been killed a day after he was abducted by ULFA cadres on July four, 1997, and his body, which was never found, was thrown into the swirling waters of the Brahmaputra. The killing,... was carried out by local cadre even before the top leadership could convey to them the message not to harm him to avoid possible international repercussions." Confirming that the death was at the hands of local ULFA terrorists, the ULFA leader, Paresh Baruah stated in an interview that "there was no instruction to kill Sanjoy Ghosh". The Central Bureau of Investigation (CBI), which had been entrusted with the investigations, of the murder of Sanjoy Ghose, had filed chargesheets against 11 ULFA militants. The local ULFA leader, Amrit Datta, who was accused of masterminding the kidnap and murder of Sanjoy Ghose was killed in a joint operation by the Central Reserve Police Force (CRPF), and the local police in a shootout in the evening of 19 July 2008 in Majuli.

Arabinda Rajkhowa, the Chairman of ULFA, publicly apologised at Majuli for the killing of Sanjoy Ghose, as per news reports of June 2011. His widow, Mrs. Schumita Ghose, responded, "Only the Almighty has the power to forgive. I am just a human being and I want justice to be done."

== Legacy ==
An international appeal for his release carried by the journal Economic and Political Weekly, summarised his work in Rajasthan and in media advocacy thus; "From 1986 to 1995 Sanjoy did pioneering work in western Rajasthan. He set up URMUL Trust in 1986 in Bikaner with the chief objective of empowering the local people to address their own development needs. By 1995, URMUL expanded into a network of organisations addressing the concerns of the poor in the districts of Bikaner, Jodhpur and Jaisalmer in western Rajasthan. Sanjoy wrote extensively and spiritedly on development issues. He was one of the firsts to realise the need for media advocacy for the NGOs and struggle-based groups, and established CHARKHA as an interface between NGOs and the mainstream media.".

The Ashoka: Innovators for the Public had instituted the Sanjoy Ghose Endowment in his memory in 1998 for "building a culture of volunteerism and a sense of citizen responsibility among the youth in India's northeastern state of Assam" The Sanjoy Ghose Memorial Trust Society was formed in the year 2000, in Majuli. The Trust has been holding memorial services every year on 4 July, the day of his disappearance and suspected death. The Trust announced plans to launch an audio-video project on school documentation in Majuli on Ghose's 15th memorial day on 4 July 2011:in a bid to carry on the social worker's legacy. A fictionalised biography on Sanjoy Ghose, written in the Assamese was published in 2008.

A website in his memory was launched on the fifteenth "smriti divas" (remembrance day) on 4 July 2011 by this trust.

His book, Sanjoy's Assam, has been used by the 2011 Indian anti-corruption movement, to initiate the anti corruption movement in Assam. A bilingual film inspired by his life was made in Assamese and Hindi, which was directed by Bidyut Kotoky and produced by the National Film Development Corporation of India. The film was shot in Majuli and Mumbai. The Assamese version, titled Ekhon Nedekha Nodir Xhipare, was released on 14 September 2012. The film won two awards for the Best Script and Best Actor at the second edition of the Washington DC South Asian Film Festival. The film won the Audience Choice Award at the North Carolina International South Asian Film Festival (NCISAFF) for 2014. The Hindi version, titled As the River Flows, is yet to release.

In 2016 and 2017, students of the Institute of Rural Management Anand, have celebrated his birthday, (7 December) as "Joy Day': by organising a blood donation drive, and hosting a function to remember him in their campus.

== CHARKHA ==
CHARKHA has instituted the "Sanjoy Ghose Media Fellowships" in his memory. This has been awarded since 2003 in the state of Jammu and Kashmir, to encourage writers, particularly women, to generate research based writings that reflect their unique perspective on the concerns of their people in a region that has known conflicts for several decades now.

In 2011, the award was targeted to women writers from the underdeveloped mountain region of Ladakh. In 2015, the award had been renamed Sanjoy Ghose Rural Reporting Awards (Ladakh) 2015
