= Bhaskar Ghose =

Indian government official (born 1938)

- Born: 1938 (age 87–88)
- Education: St. Stephen's College, Delhi
- Occupations: Indian Administrative Service, writer, theatre actor and director
- Spouse: Alarmel Valli
- Children: Sagarika Ghose
- Relatives: Arundhati Ghose (sister); Ruma Pal (sister); Sanjay Ghose (nephew)

Bhaskar Ghose is a retired Indian, former Secretary, Ministry of Information and Broadcasting 1993–1995, and a former Director General of Doordarshan 1986–1988.

He has long been involved with theatre and has directed and acted in many plays. He anchored the film review show, The Bhaskar Ghose show on Star Movies for four years. He is married to the acclaimed dancer Alarmel Valli and lives in Delhi.
