= Samaraditya Pal =

Indian lawyer (1938–2023)

Samaraditya Pal or Bacchu Pal, (15 December 1938 – 9 March 2023) was an Indian senior advocate and one of the most prominent barristers of the Calcutta High Court. His wife, Ruma Pal, is a retired judge of the Supreme Court of India.

== Life and career ==
Pal completed his schooling from St Xavier’s School and passed from Presidency College, Kolkata. He passed LL.B from Calcutta University. Pal acquired his barrister degree from Inner Temple, London. Pal authored books on various subjects of law, which were published by LexisNexis. He had represented several famous cases, amongst them were representing Tata Motors and the Election Commission of West Bengal in Panchayet Poll.

Pal died at age 84 on 9 March 2023 in Kolkata.
