= Shamnad Basheer =

Indian jurist (1976–2019)

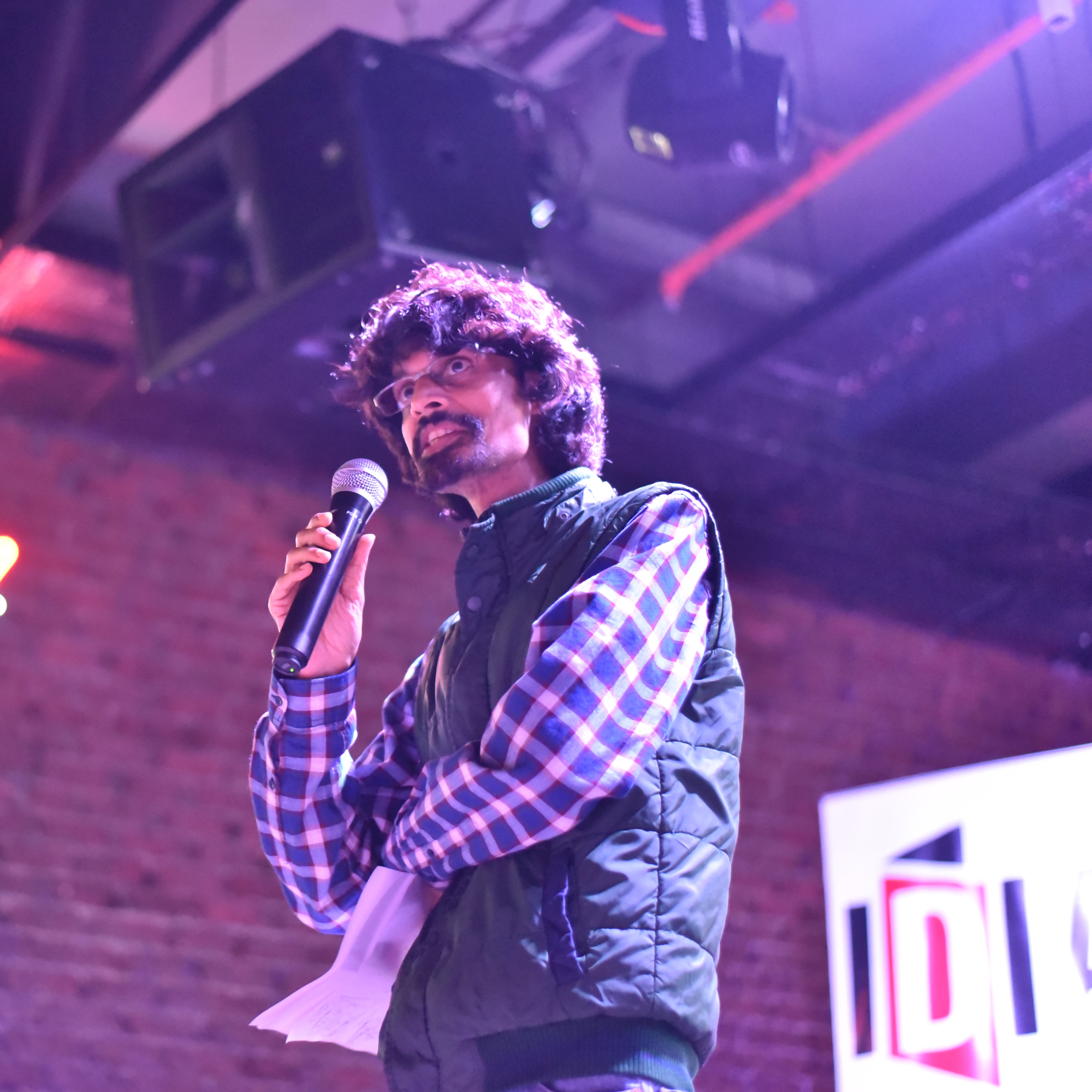
- Prof. Dr. Shamnad Basheer at IFL Night 2018
- Born: 14 May 1976; Kulathupuzha, Kollam
- Died: circa 8 August 2019 (aged 43); Chikkamagaluru
- Education: The Laidlaw Memorial School and Junior College, Ketti, St. Thomas Residential School, National Law School of India University, University of Oxford
- Occupations: Legal scholar, activist
- Organization: Increasing Diversity by Increasing Access
- Known for: Intellectual property rights
- Parent(s): Adv. Basheer MM and Late. Seenath Beevi
- Relatives: Nihad Basheer, Nihas Basheer, Nisha Basheer
- Awards: Infosys Prize in Humanities

Shamnad Basheer (14 May 1976 – c. 8 August 2019) was an Indian legal scholar and founder of the blog SpicyIP. He was also the founder of IDIA, a trust which works on making legal education accessible for underprivileged students. Basheer was a Ministry of Human Resource Development Chaired Professor of Intellectual Property Law at the WBNUJS, Kolkata, and the Frank H. Marks Visiting Associate Professor of Intellectual Property Law at the George Washington University Law School, and a research associate at the Oxford Intellectual Property Research Center (OIPRC). He founded several initiatives such as SpicyIP, IDIA, P-PIL and Lex Biosis. Basheer intervened in the landmark Novartis case, filed a number of other public interest litigations and took initiative to bring about changes in the IPR regime in India.

== Education and life ==
Basheer graduated from one of India's premier law schools, the National Law School of India University, Bangalore. He then joined Anand and Anand, a leading intellectual property law firm in New Delhi, and worked on a variety of contentious and non-contentious IP matters before being called upon to head the firm's IT and Telecommunications Law Division, India. While in practice, the IFLR 1000 guide rated him as a leading technology lawyer.

Basheer did his post-graduate studies at the University of Oxford. He completed the BCL (as a Shell Centenary scholar) and MPhil with distinction; his thesis dealing with biotechnology and patent law in India was awarded the second prize in a writing contest held by the Stanford Technology Law Review. He read for the DPhil (Ph.D.) and was a Wellcome Trust scholar. He was an invited research fellow at the Institute of Intellectual Property (IIP), Tokyo, an International Bar Association (IBA) scholar, and an Inter Pacific Bar Association (IPBA) scholar.

He was an editor of the Oxford Commonwealth Law Journal (OUCLJ) and a founding member of EDIP (Electronic Database of Intellectual Property). His research interests included intellectual property issues (particularly patents and copyrights) and innovation/creativity policy, public health, international trade issues, competition law, and issues around legal education.

He spoke on these themes at various conferences and also published papers in leading technology journals such as the Yale Technology Law Journal, Intellectual Property Quarterly, European Intellectual Property Law Review and Journal of Law Technology and Policy. He was a keynote speaker at Consilience 2016, organised by National Law School of India University, Bengaluru on Intellectual Property: Open Access and Unleashing the Commons.

== Death ==
Basheer was found dead in his car in Chickmagalur on 8 August 2019, after having been incommunicado since 5 August 2019, three days after relatives reported him missing. He is suspected to have died of suffocation.

== Scholarships, prizes and awards ==
- 2016: Society of Indian Law Firms awarded Shamnad Basheer with Legal Education Innovation Award 2016 in recognition of innovation and leadership in the development of Increasing Diversity by Increasing Access (IDIA) and promoting legal careers among the under-privileged.
- Infosys Science Foundation Award, 2014.
- 2007: Awarded the first place in a writing contest held by ATRIP for an article dealing with the Novartis-Gleevec patent case in India.
- 2004: Awarded the second prize in a writing contest held by the Stanford Technology Law Review for an article on biotechnology and patent law in India.
- 2004: Awarded the MS Lin Scholarship to attend the Inter Pacific Bar Association (IPBA) conference in Seoul.
- 2003: Awarded the Wellcome Trust studentship prize and the Clarendon Scholarship for the Mphil/Dphil at Oxford.
- 2003: Awarded a distinction on the BCL at Oxford.
- 2003: Awarded the IBA (International Bar Association) scholarship.
- 2002: Awarded the Shell Centenary-British Chevening Scholarship for the BCL at Oxford.
- 2002: Rated as one of the leading technology lawyers in India by the IFLR 1000 guide (a Euromoney publication) in 2002.
- 2001: Awarded the second best prize by the Institute of Company Secretaries of India (ICSI) for an article on "Internet and Intellectual Property Rights".

== Books ==
- Basheer, Shamnad (2013). The Invention of an Investment Incentive for Pharmaceutical Innovation. University of Oxford.
- Basheer, Shamnad; Wilkof, Neil, eds. (2012). Overlapping Intellectual Property Rights. Oxford University Press. ISBN 9780191642890.
