= Arundhati Ghose =

Indian diplomat (1939–2016)

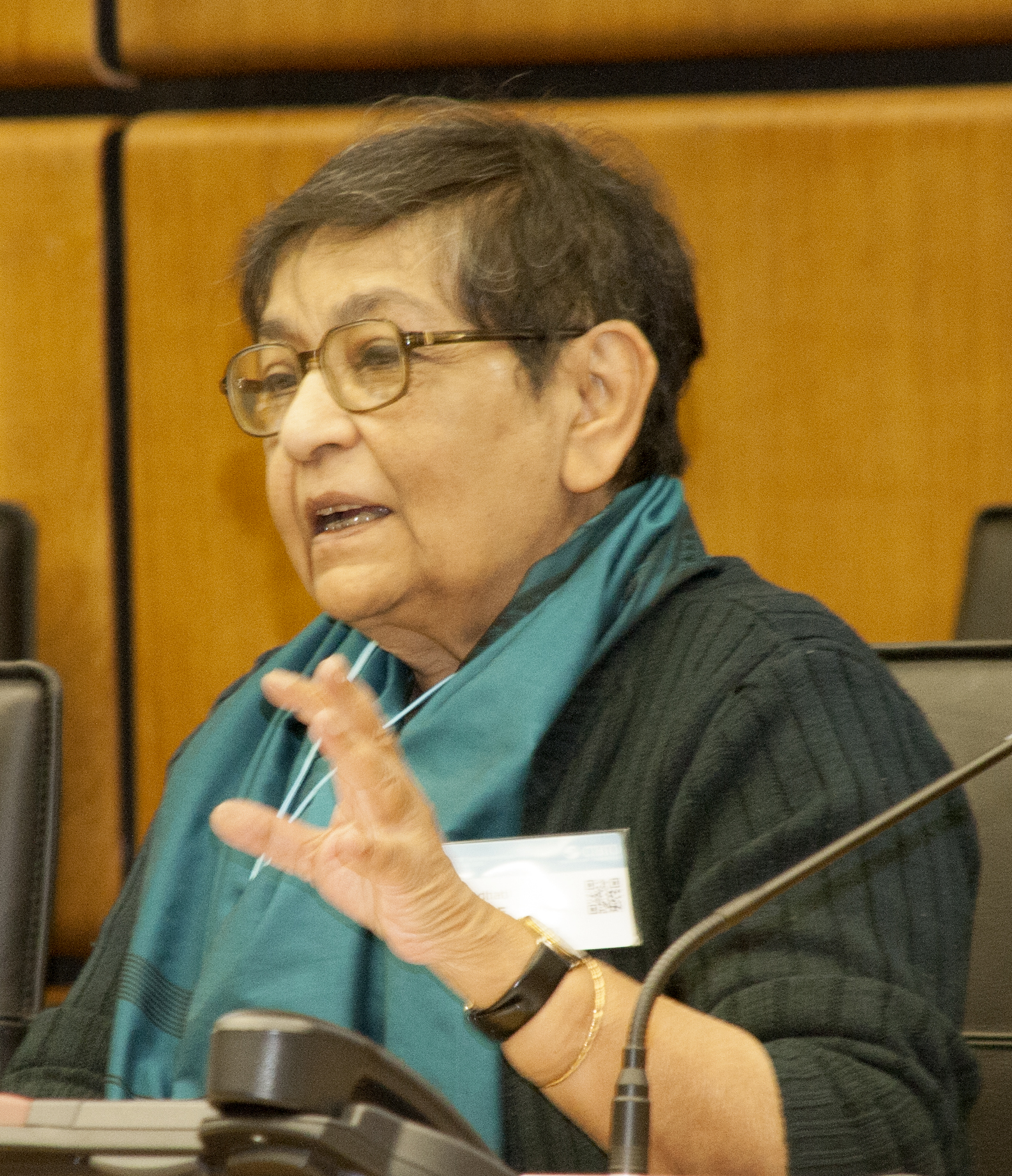
- Ghose speaking at the CTBT Diplomacy and Public Policy course in Vienna, July 2013

Permanent Representative of India to the UN Office in Geneva

IFS
- In office 1995–1997

Indian Ambassador to the Arab Republic of Egypt
- In office 1992–1995

Personal details
- Born: 25 November 1939
- Died: 25 July 2016 (aged 76)
- Relations: Bhaskar Ghose (brother); Ruma Pal (sister); Sagarika Ghose (niece); Sanjay Ghose (nephew)
- Education: Lady Brabourne College
- Occupation: Diplomat

Arundhati Ghose (25 November 1939 – 25 July 2016) was an Indian diplomat. She was Permanent Representative of India to the UN Offices in Geneva and was head of the Indian delegation that participated in the Comprehensive Nuclear-Test-Ban Treaty (CTBT) negotiations at the Conference on Disarmament in Geneva in 1996. She also served as Ambassador to the Republic of Korea and the Arab Republic of Egypt.

== Early life ==
Ghose grew up in Mumbai and studied at Cathedral and John Connon School. She graduated from Lady Brabourne College in Kolkata and went on to study at Visva-Bharati University, in Shantiniketan, before joining the Indian Foreign Service in 1963.

Ghose came from a prominent Bengali family. She is a sister of Ruma Pal, a former Supreme court judge, and of Bhaskar Ghose, former chairman of Prasar Bharati. She is the aunt of journalist Sagarika Ghose and Sanjay Ghose, a social worker who was abducted and killed by ULFA in Assam in 1997.

== Career ==
In the course of her career, Ghose served in Austria, the Netherlands, Bangladesh and the Permanent Mission of India in New York. She was also the key liaison to the Bangladesh Government in exile in Calcutta during the 1971 War.

In 1996, Ghose was deputed to head India's delegation to the CTBT conference in Geneva. India was a key participant at this conference, being one of only three countries that possessed nuclear technology and yet remained unrecognized as a nuclear power and outside the ambit of the Nuclear Non-proliferation Treaty (NPT). In keeping with its long standing and oft-enunciated policy, India declined to endorse any regime that permitted some countries to retain nuclear weaponry while limiting the ability of other countries to develop similar capabilities of their own. She resisted pressure from the Western countries on India to sign the CTBT, attaining celebrity status in India in the process.

She retired in November 1997.

== Post-retirement ==
She was actively engaged in a number of activities till her death from cancer in 2016. She was a Member of the Union Public Service Commission (UPSC) from 1998 to 2004. She was a member of the UN Secretary General’s Advisory Board on Disarmament Matters from 1998 to 2001. She was a Member from India to the Committee for Economic, Social and Cultural Rights from 2004 to 2005. She was a member of the Executive Council of the Institute for Defence Studies and Analyses from 2004 to 2007. She was also a member of Task Force on non-proliferation and Disarmament set up by the Ministry of External Affairs in 2007.

== Awards and honours ==
- Friends of Liberation War Honour by the Government of Bangladesh on 27 March 2012.

== See also ==
- Navtej Sarna
- Taranjit Singh Sandhu
- Harsh Vardhan Shringla
