= Mahendra Pal Singh (legal scholar) =

Indian jurist and scholar (1940–2026)

M.P. Singh

Chancellor, Central University of Haryana

Personal details
- Born: M. P. Singh; 15 July 1940 Jitholi, Meerut district, United Provinces, British India
- Died: 7 March 2026 (aged 85)
- Education: Columbia University; University of Lucknow; University of Agra

Academic work
- Sub-discipline: Constitutional Law, Administrative Law, Comparative Law, Indian Legal System, Human Rights, and Law and Development

Mahendra Pal Singh (15 July 1940 – 7 March 2026) was an Indian jurist and a scholar of constitutional law, administrative law and comparative law, and Professor Emeritus at University of Delhi. He later served as a research professor of law, Distinguished Scholar in Public Law & Comparative Law, Director – Centre for Comparative Law and Chairman of the Law School Doctoral Committee at Jindal Global Law School, OP Jindal Global University. Singh is best known amongst students of the Constitution of India as the author of V.N. Shukla's Constitution of India a standard textbook for lawyers on the Constitution of India. Internationally however, he is more renowned amongst scholars of comparative law for his work, German Administrative Law in Common Law Perspective.

== Early life and influences ==
Singh was born in a village called Jitholi in the district of Meerut in United Provinces. Having lost his parents at a very young age, he was brought up by his grandparents. Most of his childhood and adulthood were spent in this rural environment, an element which according to him left a lasting impression on his understanding of the nature of Indian legal systems. He received his Bachelor of Arts from the University of Agra, followed by an LL.B from the same institution. He said that he had been motivated to study the Constitution after having read Corwin's "The Higher Law" Background of American Constitutional Law. He read for his LL.M at University of Lucknow under the leading constitutional law expert, V. N. Shukla. He followed it up with another LL.M at the Columbia Law School, where he had the opportunity to study under the leading authority on American administrative law and civil liberties, Walter Gellhorn. He came back to India to read for his LL.D from the University of Lucknow. In 1970, Singh joined the Faculty of Law, University of Delhi, where he was to remain as a professor of Law until 2005. At the University of Delhi, P. K. Tripathi had an important influence on his work. From 1980 until 1982 and then again in 1985, he studied and researched in Germany at the South Asia Institute of the University of Heidelberg, and at the Max Planck Institute for Comparative Public Law and International Law. The result was not only a fruition of learned academics, but also lifelong association with leading German scholars. Most important of these was Dietrich Conrad, one of the leading scholars of constitutional law from post-World War II Germany.

== Career ==
Singh started his career in 1964 as a lecturer of law at the University of Meerut, and later in 1970 moved to the Faculty of Law, University of Delhi. He also served as the Director of the Indian Law Institute. From December 2006 to December 2011, he was the Vice-Chancellor of The West Bengal National University of Juridical Sciences, Kolkata. NUJS Law Review, which is a quarterly publication of that university, was conceptualised by him and has undertaken the responsibility of conducting and publishing its own research. He was also its founding Editor-in-Chief. He had also been the Chairperson of the Delhi Judicial Academy. Singh was until his death Chancellor of the Central University of Haryana. He was also a visiting professor at the National Law University Delhi where he held the Chair of Comparative Law.

On his 70th birthday on 15 July 2010, a festschrift titled "Law and (In) Equalities" was released in his honour. The book dwells on the aspects of societal inequality in India, a theme which remained central to Singh's study of Indian Constitution and law. In another gesture, on 12 December 2009, the All India Law Teacher's Congress presented Professor Singh the 'Life Time Best Teacher Award'. On 28 September 2017, the University of Delhi conferred upon him the title of Professor Emeritus in recognition of his achievements as Professor of Law.

== Central themes in work ==
Unarguably, Singh's most important contribution was by way of analysing and understanding persistent inequalities in Indian society. Within the framework of the Indian Constitution, he argued for a distinction between distributive justice and compensatory justice, emphasising the importance of the latter in battling the age-old hierarchies within Indian society. His work on reservation for backward classes and minorities led to him to conclude that the fundamental rights mentioned in the Constitution should be interpreted in an Indian context, which means that a betterment of the society has to be brought about in terms of understanding and improving the Indian ways of life, rather than attempting their surgical replacement.

== Positions held ==
Singh was a fellow and visiting professor at several institutions and universities of international repute. In 1985 he was designated as the Professor of Law at Faculty of Law, University of Delhi. in 1994, he was appointed the Dean of the Faculty of Law, and Head of the Department of Law, University of Delhi, positions that he retained till 1997. In 1980–1982 and again in 1985 he was Alexander von Humboldt Fellow at the University of Heidelberg. The result of this stay was not only his works on German administrative law, and on minorities, but also a long and fruitful association between Indian and German legal academia. He briefly served as the Director of the Indian Law Institute in 1997. He joined the West Bengal National University of Juridical Sciences as its Vice-Chancellor in December 2006 till 2011. Between 2007 and 2010 he co-chaired Task Force - 1, Commission on Centre-State Relationship, Government of India. He then served as Chairperson of Delhi Judicial Academy from 2011 till 2013. He also served as External Advisor, Centre for Minority Studies, Kansai University, Japan.

He was also a visiting professor and Head of Law Division at the South Asia Institute, University of Heidelberg in 1987–88 and visiting professor at the Faculty of Law, University of Heidelberg in 1991–92. In 1999–2000 and 2001 he was fellow at the Max Planck Institute for Comparative Public Law and International Law, Heidelberg. He was a visiting professor at the University of Hong Kong and the City University of Hong Kong in 1993, 1994, 1995, 1998, 2000 and 2005, Kansai University, Osaka in 2002, National University of Singapore in 2005 and Jawaharlal Nehru University, New Delhi in 2006. In 2002–03 he was fellow at the Institute for Advanced Study, Berlin and in 2004, at the Indian Institute of Science, Bangalore. In 2008 Renmin University of China, Beijing honoured him as visiting professor for three years. His publications include over one hundred papers in different legal journals and edited works and ten books including German Administrative Law in Common Law Perspective, Freedom of Trade and Commerce in India, Comparative Constitutional Law, Legal Dimensions of Market Economy and Human Rights and Basic Needs.

== Work on legal education in India ==
Singh laid especial emphasis in making legal education more meaningful to Indian society by making the top law schools more accessible to the students from less privileged background. At NUJS, and thereafter, he was leading an effort called IDIA, or 'Increasing Diversity by Increasing Access', which involves an engagement with schoolgoing children from different parts of semi-urban and rural India and to encourage and help them enter the top law schools of the country. Towards the same end, he also headed a group of academicians, called the Legal Education and Research Society or 'LEARS' as it is popularly referred to. He also ran a school in his village Jitholi for the children of the nearby places. Students from NUJS and volunteers from IDIA have often visited and interacted with the children of this school.

== Personal life and death ==
Singh was married to Sarla Singh, who was also a teacher. They had three children: Sandhya, Shailendra and Swati.

Singh died on 7 March 2026, at the age of 85 at his native village, Jitholi in Uttar Pradesh.

Preceded by B.S. Chimni	Vice Chancellor of NUJS; December 2006 – December 2012	Succeeded by Ishwara P Bhatt
