= Shakeel Ahmed Samdani =

Indian scholar (1961–2021)

Professor Shakeel Ahmed Samdani
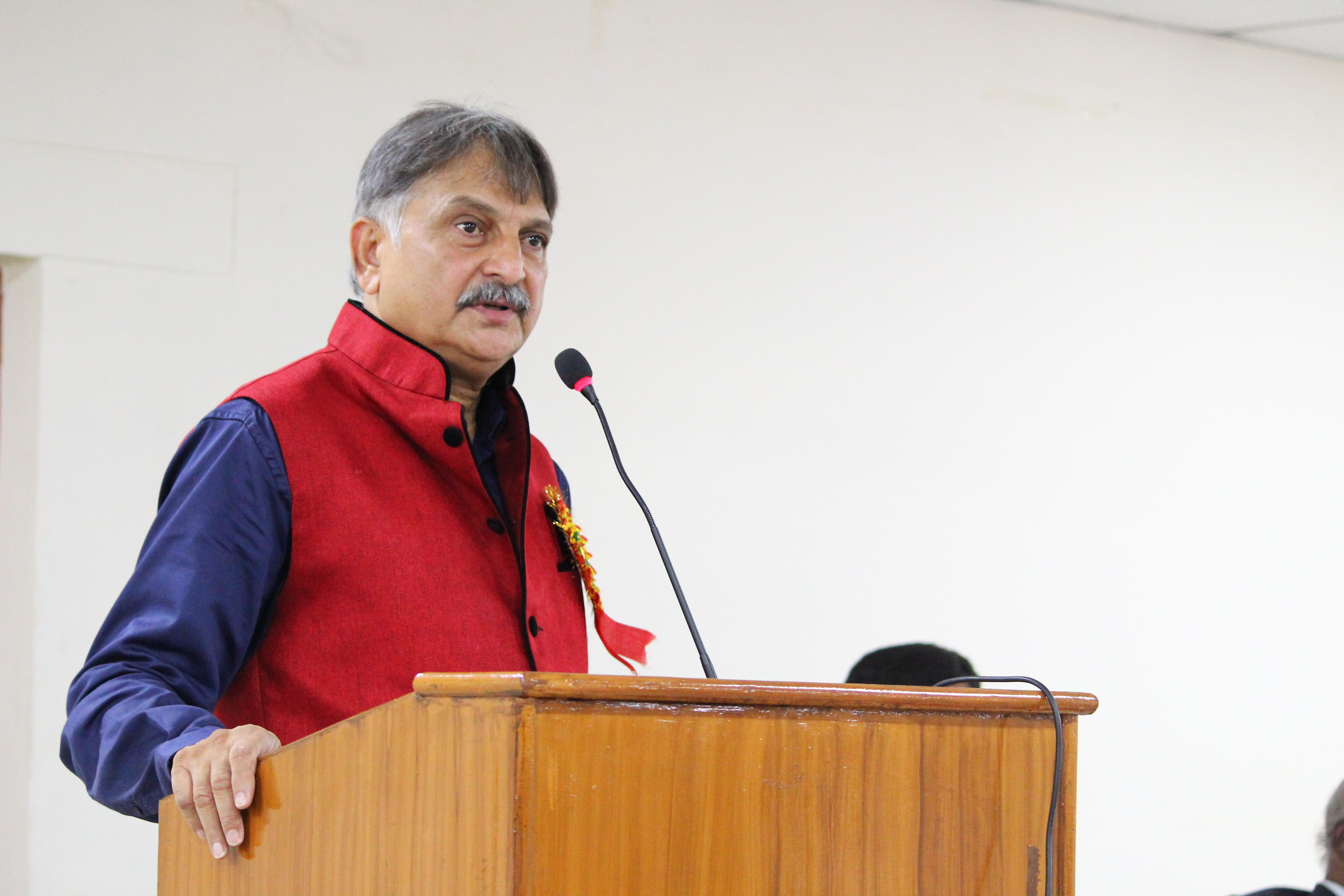
- Born: 21 June 1961; Jaunpur, Uttar Pradesh, India
- Died: 8 May 2021 (aged 59); Aligarh, Uttar Pradesh, India
- Education: Deen Dayal Upadhyay Gorakhpur University; Aligarh Muslim University
- Occupations: Academic, author, Social Worker, Public Speaker
- Years active: 1989–2021
- Known for: Muslim law teacher, Public speaker for highlighting Muslim issues
- Notable work: Uniform Civil Code: Problems and Prospects, Maintenance of Muslim Divorcee and Understanding Human Rights and Law.
- Awards: Herz Dr Gerhard Glinzerer Award
- Website: profshakeelsamdani.in

Shakeel Ahmed Samdani (21 June 1961 – 8 May 2021) was an Indian academic scholar who served as the Dean of the Faculty of Law at Aligarh Muslim University. He was an alumnus of the Deen Dayal Upadhyay Gorakhpur University and the Aligarh Muslim University. He established Sir Syed Awareness Forum and served as its director. He was a member of the All India Muslim Personal Law Board and authored books including Uniform Civil Code: Problems and Prospects, Maintenance of Muslim Divorcee and Understanding Human Rights and Law.

== Biography ==
Samdani was born on 21 June 1961. He received a B.A. from Deen Dayal Upadhyay Gorakhpur University in 1979. He later went to the Aligarh Muslim University, where he obtained an LLB in 1983, an LL.M. in 1987 and completed his doctoral studies in 2002.

Samdani taught at the Aligarh Muslim University's Faculty of Law. In 2019, he was appointed the dean. He earlier served as the professor for twelve years before being promoted to the position of dean.

In July 2020, the Law Faculty of the AMU organized its first ever virtual international conference on Globalization of Justice through ADR under his deanship. He taught Muslim Law, International Law, Human Rights and Islamic Jurisprudence at the university.

During his career, Samdani served as the Nodal Officer for AMU Centers; Coordinator for Cultural Education Center; Estate Officer (Gazetted) for the Aligarh Muslim University. He was a member of the Executive Council of the university and its court. He established the Sir Syed Awareness Forum in 2004 and served as its founder president and director. He was a member of the All India Muslim Personal Law Board. He was conferred with the Herz Dr Gerhard Glinzerer Award on 26 July 2020.

Samdani died of COVID-19 complications on 8 May 2021, at the Jawaharlal Nehru Medical College in Aligarh. His death was seen as a setback for Muslim voices in India.

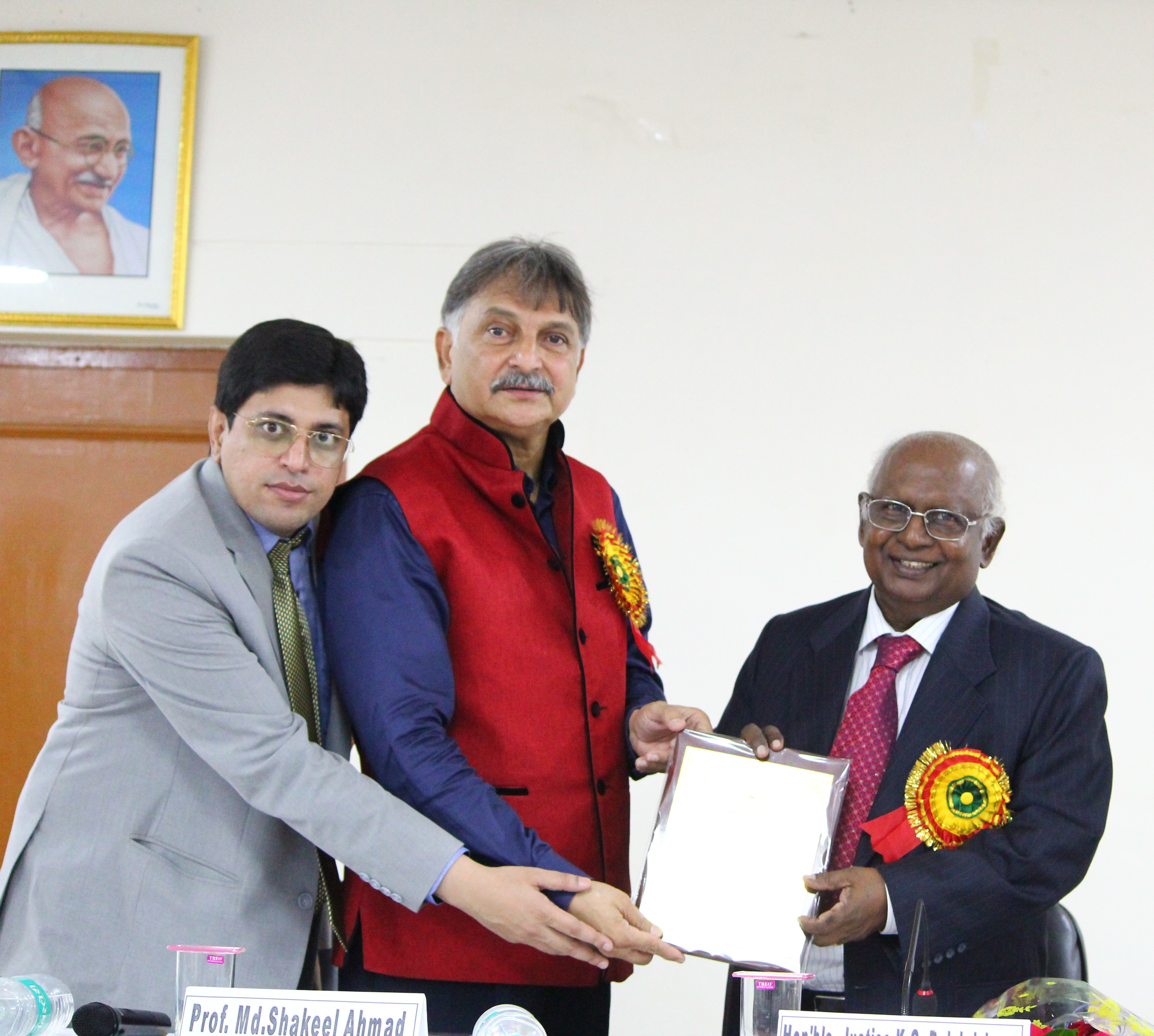
Prof Shakeel Ahmed Samdani felicitating Justice K G Balakrishnan

== Books ==
Samdani's works include:

- Uniform Civil Code: Problems and Prospects
- Maintenance of Muslim Divorcee
- Understanding Human Rights and Law

== Publications ==
Samdani was a prolific writer who has contributed a lot in the field of law. He has written 241 research papers/ articles in various books and journals in English, Urdu and Hindi. Apart from this he regularly wrote columns in various newspapers and magazines on social and legal issues.
