= Dr. Ambedkar Foundation =

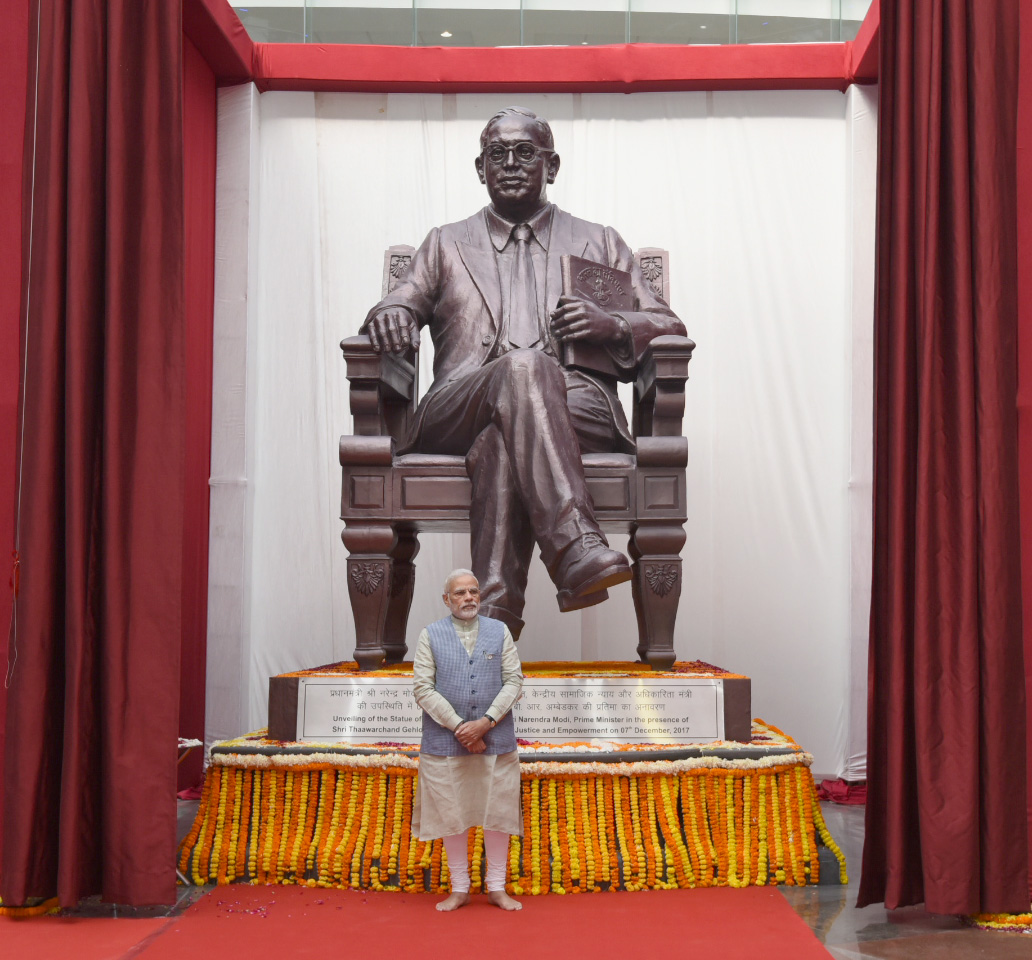
- Formation: March 24, 1992; 34 years ago
- Type: Autonomous body
- Purpose: Social justice, equality, and education
- Headquarters: New Delhi, India
- Region served: India
- Parent organization: Ministry of Social Justice and Empowerment, Government of India

The Dr. Ambedkar Foundation is an autonomous organization under the Ministry of Social Justice and Empowerment of India.

== History ==
The Dr. Ambedkar Foundation was established following recommendations from the Centenary Celebrations Committee, formed to mark the 100th birth anniversary of Dr. B.R. Ambedkar in 1991. It was registered as a society on March 24, 1992 under the Societies Registration Act, 1860.
