= Ruma Pal =

Indian judge (born 1941)

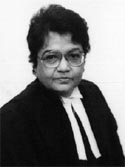

Judge of the Supreme Court of India
- In office 28 January 2000 – 2 June 2006
- Appointed by: A. P. J. Abdul Kalam

Judge of the Calcutta High Court
- In office 1990–2000

Personal details
- Born: 3 June 1941 (age 85) Calcutta, Bengal Province, British India
- Spouse: Samaraditya Pal
- Relations: Bhaskar Ghose (brother); Arundhati Ghose (sister); Sagarika Ghose (niece); Sanjay Ghose (nephew)
- Education: St Anne's College, Oxford

Justice Ruma Pal (born 3 June 1941) is a former judge of the Supreme Court of India. She retired on 3 June 2006.

== Early life ==
She studied for her B.C.L degree at St Anne's College, Oxford and started practice in 1968 in Civil, Revenue, Labour and Constitutional matters in the Calcutta High Court. Her husband Samaraditya Pal was one of well known barristers of Kolkata.

== Career ==
After a long and distinguished career as an advocate, she was appointed Judge in the Calcutta High Court on 6 August 1990. She was nominated to Supreme Court of India on 28 January 2000, the day of the Golden Jubilee of the court. Justice Pal has delivered many critical judgements in famous cases. She has written on a number of human rights issues. She is also a member of the International Forum of Women Judges.

Pal edited many textbooks for legal studies including famous book on Indian Constitutional Law by Prof. M P Jain, which is considered as an authority. She became the Chancellor of Sikkim University and one of the trustees of legal diversity Nonprofit organization Increasing Diversity by Increasing Access.
