= National Judicial Academy (India) =

Judicial training wing of India

National Judicial Academy (राष्ट्रीय न्यायिक अकादमी)
- Motto: Knowledge for Justice

INSTITUTION OVERVIEW
- Established: 1993
- Type: Independent Registered Society
- Legal Status: The Societies Registration Act, 1860
- Director: Justice (Retd.) Aniruddha Bose
- Chairperson: Chief Justice of India
- Location: Bhopal, Madhya Pradesh
- Country: India
- Campus: 63 acre
- Funding: Government of India
- Academic Program: National Judicial Education Strategy (NJES)
- Purpose: Judicial Officers Training
- Faculty: 17
- Website: www.nja.gov.in

National Judicial Academy for judicial education and training was a significant initiative of the Supreme Court of India conceived in early 1990s. The National Judicial Academy was formally dedicated to the Nation on 5 September 1992. The Academy, spread over a sprawling 63 acre campus, atop a hillock, overlooking the Upper Lake at Bhopal has an architectural ambience.

Registered as a Society in 1993 under the Societies Registration Act (1860), the Academy is managed by a Governing Council chaired by the Chief Justice of India; and comprising two senior most Judges of the Supreme Court, three Secretaries to the Government of India in the departments of Law and Justice, Finance, and Legal Affairs.

Under the Memorandum of the Society, the mandated objectives of the Academy include;

1. To establish a center of excellence in the study, research and training of court management and administration of justice and to suggest improvements to the judicial system;

2. To provide training and continuing legal education to judicial officers and ministerial officers of the courts; and

3. To disseminate information relating to judicial administration, publish research papers, books, monographs, journals etc. and collaborate with other institutions both within the country and abroad.

The seminal emphasis being to strengthen the administration of justice through judicial education, research and policy development and towards achievement of these goals, the Academy strives to:

1. Deliver judicial education and training for judges, court staff and other stakeholders in the administration of justice oriented towards addressing national priorities in justice administration;

2. Carry out studies/research on the administration of justice and court management and suggest improvements;

3. Generate and disseminate knowledge on the administration of justice and court management;

4. Promote highest standards of professional competence and practice amongst judicial officers and court staff;

5. Integrate state of the art information and communications technologies calibrated to functioning of court systems for ensuring transparency, enhancing excellence and accelerating the process of speedy justice delivery; and

6. Make the NJA a world class center of excellence in judicial education, training and knowledge in judicial science in India and abroad.

Judicial education as justice delivery, is ever a work in progress. Jurisprudence and technology are constantly evolving. This dynamic invites constant revision of administrative practices, employment of contemporaneous technology relevant to court management; upgrading infrastructure for integrating available technology; and updating knowledge, of substantive and procedural dimensions of law to meet societal aspirations of the now and the morrow. The National Judicial Academy is equipped and constantly endeavors to meet public expectations.
