= Faizan Mustafa =

Indian academic and legal scholar

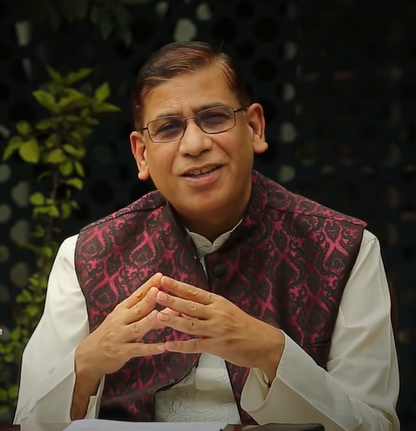
- Mustafa in 2019
- Born: Uttar Pradesh
- Education: BA (hons) in history, LLB, LLM, PhD (intellectual property rights) from Aligarh Muslim University, Aligarh UP, India
- Alma mater: Aligarh Muslim University, International Institute of Human Rights
- Occupations: Academic, author, lawyer
- Years active: since 1990
- Known for: Senior constitutional law teacher
- Title: Vice Chancellor of Chanakya National Law University, Patna
- Spouse: Ira Khan
- Awards: Moulana Mohammed Ali Johar Award, SAARC's Best Law Teacher Award, Shah Waliullah International Award,

Faizan Mustafa is an Indian academic and legal scholar. He is the former Vice-Chancellor of NALSAR University of Law, Hyderabad and the founding V.C. of National Law University Odisha (NLUO). He sits on the board of directors of technology incubator, the T-Hub. Most recently, he was the Vice-Chancellor at Chanakya National Law University, Patna.

== Education ==
He had graduated from Aligarh Muslim University in History and Law and later LL.M with distinction from Aligarh Muslim University. He has his doctorate in Copyright Law and a diploma from International Institute of Human Rights on International and Comparative Human Rights Law.

== Career ==
Before taking charge as VC of National Academy of Legal Studies and Research (NALSAR) Hyderabad, he was the founding Vice-Chancellor of National Law University Odisha (NLUO), located at Cuttack, Odisha. He is also a former director of KIIT School of Law. Currently, he is the Vice Chancellor of Chanakya National Law University (CNLU) Patna.

Besides teaching and research works in the field of law, he has also authored several books and plenty of papers in national and international journals. He has been credited to explore new areas such as HIV law. His article on religious freedom was quoted by the Supreme Court in the Sabarimala Judgement (2018).

He runs a Youtube channel with the name of Legal Awareness Web Series where he explains contemporary legal issues in simple Hindustani. He appears frequently on NDTV as a legal expert. He is a regular columnist for The Indian Express and The Hindu.

== Awards and honors ==
Mustafa is one of the most respected and internationally acclaimed legal scholar of India. He was awarded Renne Cassin Gold Medal of International Institute of Human Rights, Strasbourg, France in 1999. In 2009 he won Shah Waliullah International Award of Institute of Objective Studies, New Delhi for his paper on Constitutionalism in Islamic Perspective. He won the SAARC’s prestigious Best Law Teacher Award in 2014. A high-powered jury conferred this award on Mustafa, which was announced by N.R. Madhav Menon and Mr. Lalit Bhasin, President of Indian Law Firms.
