= West Bengal National University of Juridical Sciences =

Law university in Kolkata, West Bengal, India

- Motto: yuktī hīne vicāre tu dharmahāni prajāyate
- Motto in English: Judgment Devoid of Logic Destroys Dharma
- Recognition: BCI
- Type: National Law University
- Established: 1999; 27 years ago
- Founder: N. R. Madhava Menon
- Accreditation: NAAC
- Academic affiliations: UGC; AIU
- Budget: ₹31.41 crore (US$3.4 million) (FY2023–24 est.)
- Chancellor: Chief Justice of India
- Vice-Chancellor: O. V. Nandimath
- Academic staff: 66 (2025)
- Students: 1,030 (2025)
- Undergraduates: 714 (2025)
- Postgraduates: 100 (2025)
- Doctoral students: 216 (2025)
- Location: Kolkata, West Bengal, India; 21°8′1.65″N 82°46′44.16″E
- Campus: Urban
- Website: www.nujs.edu

The West Bengal National University of Juridical Sciences (WBNUJS or NUJS or NLU Kolkata) is a National Law University (NLU) located in Bidhannagar, Kolkata, West Bengal, India. In 2024, it was ranked 4th among law colleges in India by National Institutional Ranking Framework and 2nd by India Today. It comes under the exclusive chancellorship and purview of the Chief Justice of India and is considered to be one of the best law schools in the country.

The university is indeed recognised as one of the pioneering law universities in India to offer a five-year integrated B.A. LLB (Hons.) and an LLM program with five different specialisations (Corporate & Commercial Law, International & Comparative Law, Criminal & Security Law, Law & Technology and Intellectual Property Law), later on added a five-year B.Sc. LLB program (with a general B.Sc. degree) as well which was discontinued in 2011 after a change in BCI requirements regarding the same. It then started a B.Sc. LLB (Hons.) course, offering B.Sc. in Forensic science and Criminology, in 2023. Admission to the B.A. LLB or B.Sc. LLB degree program and the LLM. program is through the Common Law Admission Test (a highly competitive, ranked among the top 05 hardest entrance examinations in India), held jointly by the national law schools/universities. NUJS/NLU Kolkata also offers M.Sc. in Forensic science, MPhil, Ph.D., LL.D, and diplomas in business laws and other programs, in addition to a number of online courses. In 2024, it has also started a specialised 2-Year LLM. program on Data Science & Data Protection Law, in collaboration with IISER Kolkata and IIIT Kalyani as knowledge partners and Cognizant as the industry partner.

== History ==
Vice-Chancellors
- N. R. Madhava Menon (1999–2003)
- B. S. Chimni (2004–2006)
- Mahendra Pal Singh (2006–2011)
- P. Ishwara Bhat (2011–2018)
- Amit Talukdar (acting) (2018–2019)
- NK Chakrabarti (2019–2025)
- O. V. Nandimath (2025–present)

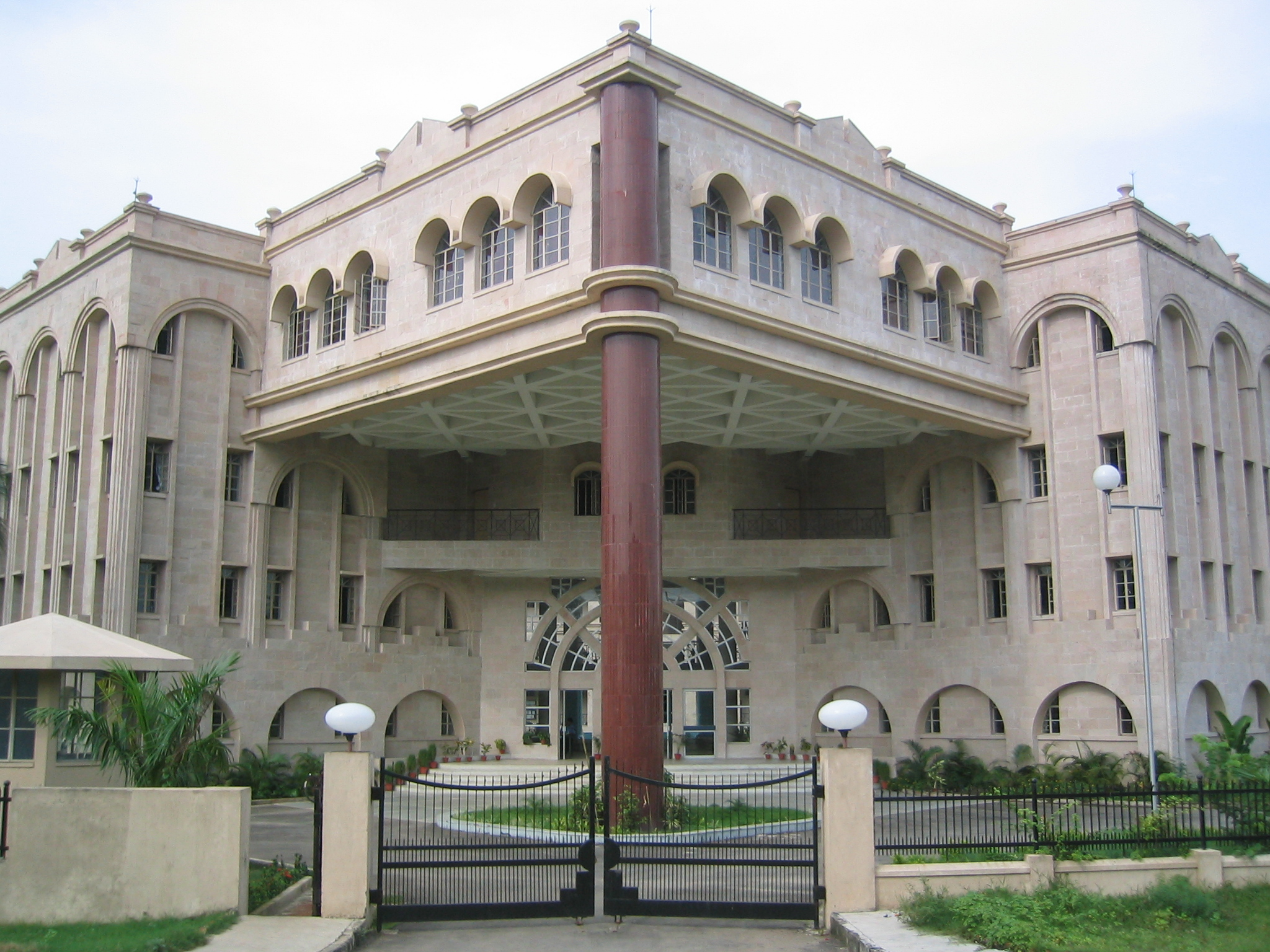
The front entrance to the academic block

NUJS was established in 1999 by the Bar Council of India (BCI), with the government of West Bengal. The Founder-Vice-Chancellor was Professor N.R. Madhava Menon, a former professor of law at Delhi University, and Founder-Director, National Law School of India University (NLSIU), Bangalore, who is credited with revolutionising the field of legal education in India, by starting the concept of "national law schools", as opposed to the traditional law colleges prevalent before.

The NUJS, along with NLSIU and GNLU, remain the only three national law schools that have the honourable Chief Justice of India as the Chancellor.

The then Chief Minister Jyoti Basu helped in improving the university. Other aspects of the university was worked on by Sh. Jyoti Basu, who also was a Middle Temple barrister, Sh. Somnath Chatterjee, former Speaker of the Lok Sabha, also a Middle Temple barrister and a leading member of the Calcutta Bar Library; and Justice Chittatosh Mookerjee, former Chief Justice of the Calcutta High Court and the Bombay High Court and the acting Governor of Maharashtra. Justice Mookerjee was the university's Honorary Treasurer and has been associated with the university's work since its inception in 1999. The NUJS is an autonomous university.

Initially, classes, which started in 2000, were held at Aranya Bhavan, where the Environment Ministry of the West Bengal government is located, and the first batches of students started living in government flats. On 28 October 2002, the university's present-day permanent campus was inaugurated by the then Chief Justice of India, B. N. Kirpal. Similarly, the first four batches of the B.Sc. LLB (Hons.) program that started in 2023 currently reside in Sector V of Bidhannagar in renovated government apartments of the BSNL Eastern Nodal Training Centre's residential society while the first year class of B.Sc. LLB. (batch of 2026-2031) has been asked to arrange private off campus living facilities. The vertical expansion of the campus have completed and all the students attend classes there. In 2006, NUJS was allotted a 50-acre (200,000 m^{2}) plot in Rajarhat, an upscale township, which is being developed by the West Bengal government.

== Campus ==
=== Hostels ===
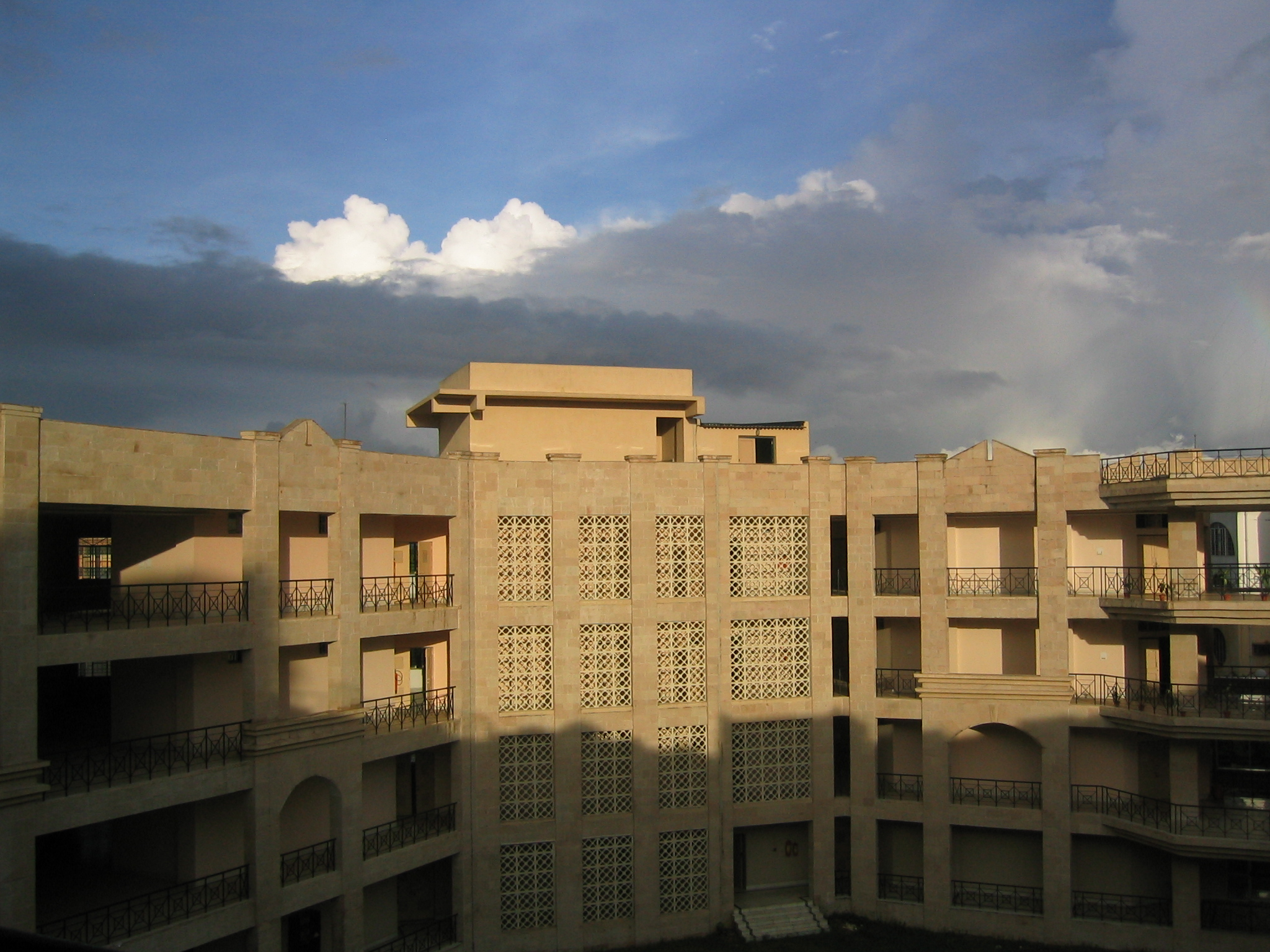
Dr. Ambedkar Bhavan (University academic block)

The Salt Lake Campus consists of an academic block and three residential blocks. The latter comprises two, seven-storied halls of residence for girls and boys, and a double-storied faculty accommodation house-cum-guest house. The second campus in Sector III for the B.Sc. LLB (Hons.), M.Sc., and LL.M. batches has twin three-storied residential blocks, one for boys and one for girls. The university's academic block, christened after B.R. Ambedkar, is a four-storied octagonal structure that opens inwardly to a lawn. The building houses classrooms, a library and reading room, two conference halls, offices and an auditorium. The temporary academic block for the B.Sc. LLB (Hons.) program in Sector I is located on the renovated first and second floors of a BSNL office, housing classrooms, a library, a conference hall, offices and an auditorium.

NUJS's main campus is located on a 5-acre (20,000 m^{2}) plot in Salt Lake City, overseeing the Eastern Metropolitan Bypass. The National Institute of Fashion Technology and the College of Leather Technology border the Campus. NUJS's Rajarhat Campus is yet to be built. No significant construction has been undertaken and the land lies vacant.

Admission to the hostels is conducted simultaneously with admission to the university.

Hostel Names: Kanchenjunga & Nilgiri.

== Organisation and administration ==
=== Centers ===
Research Centres
- Centre for Regulatory Studies, Governance and Public Policy
- Centre for Child Rights
- Justice Radha Binod Pal Centre for Critical Legal Studies
- Centre for Law, Literature and Popular Culture
- Centre for Studies in Legal History
- Centre for Entertainment and Media Laws
- Centre for Research and Studies in Land, Mining and Real Estate Laws
- Centre for Law and Technology
- Centre for Competition Laws
- Centre for Sports Law and Policy
- Centre for Politics, Law and International Relations
- Centre for Financial and Regulatory Governance Studies
- Centre for Aviation and Space Laws
- THE WBNUJS Centre for Arbitration
- Centre for Disability Rights and Equal Opportunities
- Centre For Health Laws & Policy
- Centre for Criminal Law, Criminology and Victimology
- Centre for Law and Social Justice
- Centre for Studies & Research in Forensic Science
- Centre for Technology, Entertainment and Sports Law
- Centre for Study and Research on Consumer Law
- Center for DIKW Excellence

=== Endowed chairs ===
- Ford Foundation Chair on Human Rights
- Justice Sir Asutosh Mookerjee Chair for Studies in Bengal Tradition, Law and Social Transformation.
- Justice Sunanda Bhandare Forum for Natural Resources Law (SBFNRL)
- DPIIT, Ministry of Commerce and Industry IPR Chair

=== Labs ===
- Prof. (Dr.) Shamnad Basheer Accessibility Lab

=== School of Forensic Sciences, WBNUJS, Kolkata ===
School of Forensic Sciences
- Established: 2021
- Focus: Forensic Science
- Head: Ankit Srivastava

The School of Forensic Sciences (SFS) at the West Bengal National University of Juridical Sciences (WBNUJS), Kolkata, represents a pivotal advancement in India’s interdisciplinary legal education. Established in 2021 to bridge the historical chasm between scientific rigor and judicial processes, the school operates as a specialized hub for forensic research, training, and academic excellence.

Operating in a strategic partnership with the Central Forensic Science Laboratory (CFSL), Kolkata, the SFS offers a curriculum that is both technologically current and legally grounded. Its flagship M.Sc. in Forensic Science provides specialized tracks in Toxicology, DNA Profiling, and Cyber Forensics, ensuring that graduates possess the technical dexterity required for modern criminal investigations. Furthermore, the introduction of the B.Sc. LL.B. (Hons.) program reflects a contemporary shift toward producing "lawyer-scientists" capable of navigating complex evidentiary challenges.

The school’s pedagogical approach emphasizes empirical research and practical laboratory exposure. By fostering collaborations with premier institutions like IISER Kolkata and NFSU, the SFS ensures its students remain at the forefront of forensic innovation. In an era where digital evidence and biometric data are increasingly central to the administration of justice, the School of Forensic Sciences stands as a vital institutional response to the evolving needs of the Indian judiciary.

=== Centre for Studies & Research in Forensic Science (CSRFS) ===
Established in July 2022, the Centre for Studies & Research in Forensic Science (CSRFS) addresses a critical gap in India’s scientific landscape as a premier, independent institution dedicated exclusively to research. While forensic science remains in its nascent stages compared to fundamental disciplines, its necessity within the Indian justice system is expanding rapidly.

The CSRFS serves as a vital catalyst, driving the technological evolution to modernize evidence analysis. By prioritizing investigation and innovation. Its mission focuses on developing rapid, robust, and errorless methodologies that enhance the precision of forensic findings, ultimately ensuring admissibility within the court of law and elevating the standards of criminal justice both domestically and internationally.

serves as the school's research arm. It facilitates high-level inquiry into the reliability of forensic techniques and the ethical implications of emerging technologies like facial recognition and AI-driven predictive policing. Through MoUs with institutions such as IISER Kolkata and the National Forensic Sciences University (NFSU), Gandhinagar, the school ensures that its research remains at the cutting edge of global standards.

Furthermore, its proximity to the CFSL in Kolkata provides a opportunity for students to witness the chain of custody and the rigorous standards required by government laboratories, bridging the gap between classroom theory and institutional practice.

== Academics ==
=== Academic programmes ===
==== Master of Business Laws ====
An online Masters in Business Laws degree (2 years) is now being offered by the university.

==== Diploma and post-graduate diploma ====
NUJS, in collaboration with iPleaders, offers a diploma in Entrepreneurship Administration and Business Laws, which has students from 10 different countries. This is university's most successful distance education program.

On 29 April 2013, vice-chancellor P. Ishwara Bhat issued a letter of intent.

In November 2014, the university has announced an online Executive Certification Program to train HR professionals, in-house legal counsels, NGO workers, women's rights activists and compliance professionals on sexual harassment prevention and workplace diversity management. The program is titled "Executive Certification on Sexual Harassment Prevention and Workplace Diversity Management".

NUJS used to offer a post-graduate diploma program in business law (in partnership with Rainmaker, the firm which provides logistical support in conducting All India Bar Exam), which has been now discontinued. NUJS offers corporate training course on company law to Larsen & Toubro, one of India's largest engineering and construction conglomerates, Post-Graduate Executive Diploma in Business Management and Law (in partnership with IIM Shillong),

=== Rankings ===
University rankings

Law – India
- NIRF (2024): 4
- India Today (2022): 2

NUJS was ranked second by India Today's "India's Best Colleges 2022: Law". The National Institutional Ranking Framework (NIRF) ranked it fourth (4th) in India in the law ranking in 2023 and 2024.

=== Faculty ===
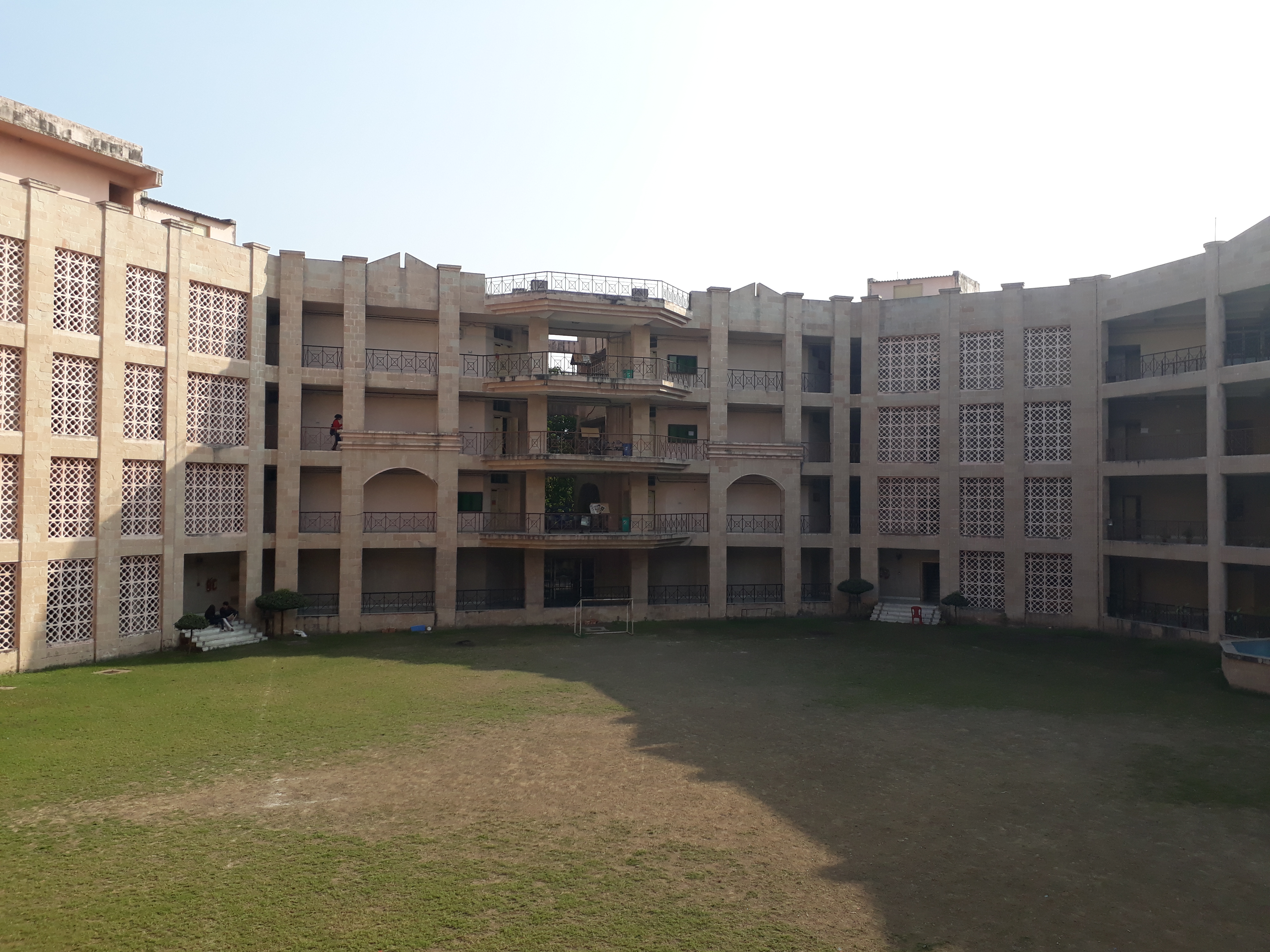
Inside of NUJS Kolkata

Among the distinguished faculty at NUJS are former judges of the Supreme Court of India, including Uday Umesh Lalit (former Chief Justice of India), who serves as a distinguished visiting professor and Justice Ruma Pal, who was the Ford Foundation Chair Professor of Human Rights, Arun Prasad Mukherjee, the former Governor of Mizoram, and Shamnad Basheer, who held the MHRD IPR Chair and who is well known in the field of intellectual property.

Pan across NUJS inner courtyard

Teachers at NUJS have degrees and fellowships from prestigious foreign universities such as Columbia Law School, University of Oxford, Harvard Law School, University of Cambridge, Yale Law School, University of Michigan Law School, Vanderbilt University, London School of Economics and Political Science (LSE), School of Oriental and African Studies (SOAS), University of Nottingham, University of Essex, and Emory University. Lecturers educated in India include alumni of institutions such as NLSIU, NALSAR University of Law, GNLU, Jawaharlal Nehru University, Presidency College, Calcutta, St. Stephen's College, Delhi and, in a recent trend, NUJS itself. The NUJS faculty has published in journals such as European Intellectual Property Review, International Journal of Biotechnology, Journal of World Investment and Trade, Yale Journal of Law and Technology among others.

=== Library ===
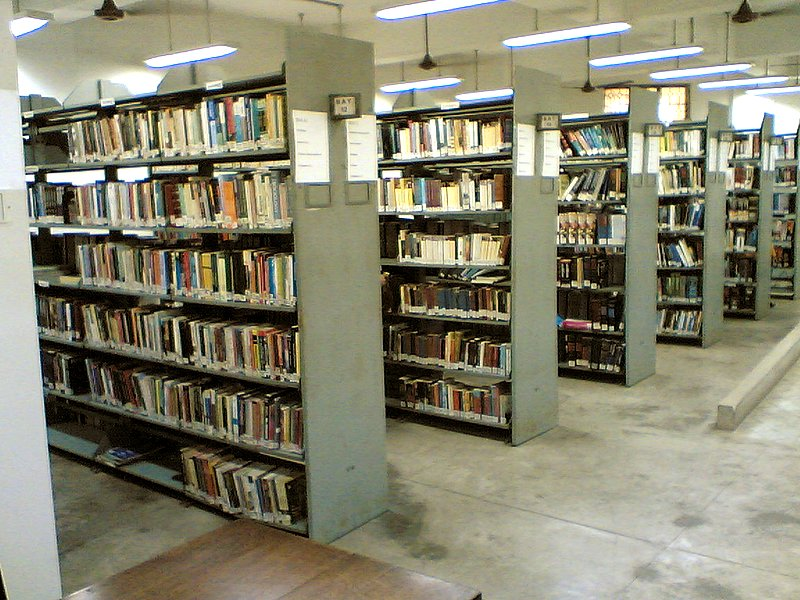
The book section of the NUJS Library

== Journals Associated ==
1. Asian Journal of Legal Education.
2. NUJS Law Review.

== Student life ==
=== Legal Aid Society ===
Members of the Legal Aid Society, assisted by teachers, offering free legal help at Midnapore.

=== Mooting achievements ===
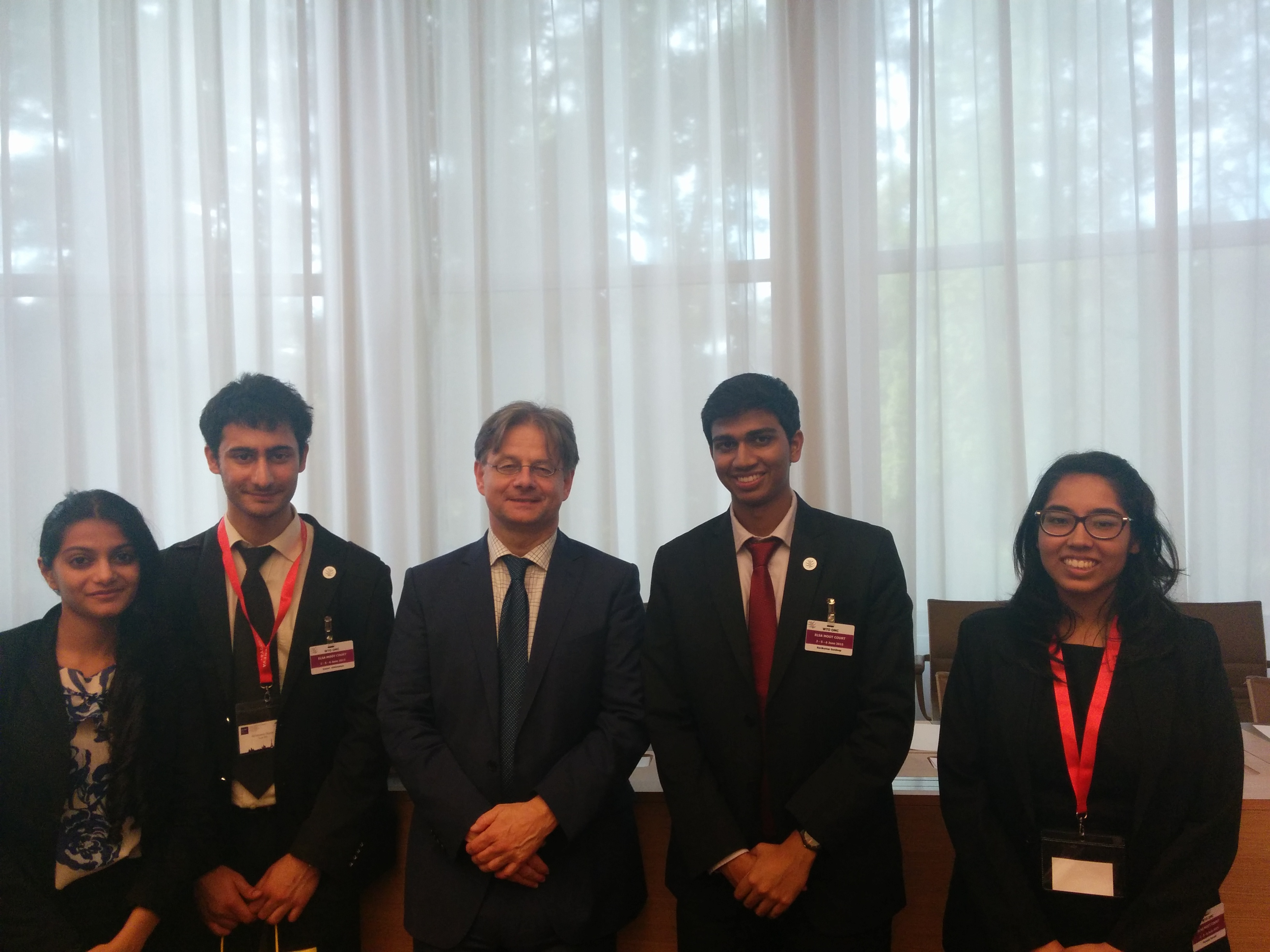
Winners of ELSA Moot Court Competition 2015 at the World Trade Organisation headquarters in Geneva. From left to right - Ira Chadha-Sridhar, Abhimanyu Hazari, Werner Zdouc (WTO), Sandeep Ravikumar and Pramiti Parwani.

Students have won numerous encomiums at national and international Moot Court competitions. In 2003, NUJS became the only Indian and second Asian college to win the Willem C. Vis International Commercial Arbitration Moot, held at Vienna. In 2005 and 2017, the University Moot team won the Willem C. Vis Moot (East) International Commercial Arbitration Moot, which is held each year in Hong Kong. In 2013, NUJS won the Pan Asian Award at the Vis (East) Competition. In the field of international trade law, NUJS has twice won The John H. Jackson Moot Court Competition conducted by the World Trade Organisation (WTO), first in 2010 and next in 2015. NUJS is the only Indian law school to have won this competition since its inception. In 2005 & 2023, NUJS also emerged as winners at the Stetson International Environmental Law Moot Court Competition at Stetson University Law School in Gulfport, Florida, USA after winning the India rounds organised by Surana and Surana Moots. In 2020, NUJS won the Willem C. Vis International Commercial Arbitration Moot, which was held online due to the COVID-19 pandemic. With this, NUJS became the only Indian university to win the moot twice.

== See also ==
- National Academy of Legal Studies and Research
- Gujarat National Law University
