= Aditya Tiwari =

Indian poet and activist

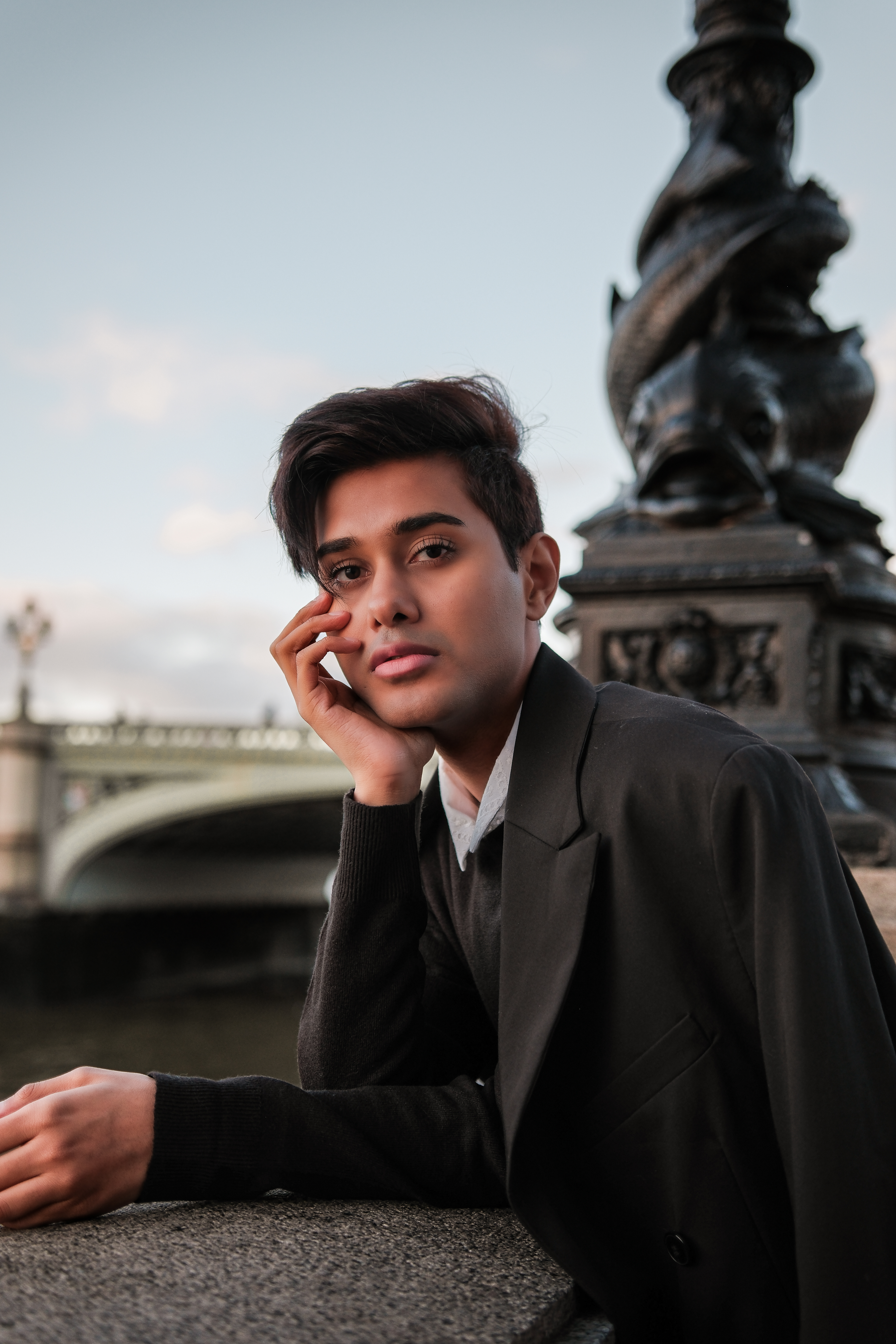
- Aditya in London 2023
- Born: Jabalpur, India
- Education: University of East Anglia
- Occupations: Poet, journalist, writer, author, broadcaster, activist
- Writing career
- Notable works: April is Lush; Over the Rainbow: India's Queer Heroes; All That's Left Behind

Aditya Tiwari is an Indian poet, writer, broadcaster and LGBTQ rights activist known for his work in contemporary Indian poetry in English. He became the first openly gay person of Indian origin to host a six-part series on the BBC and, in 2026, received the India-UK Achievers Award at the House of Lords.

== Life and career ==
He was born in Jabalpur, India and completed his primary education at St. Aloysius Senior Secondary School. He then attended the University of East Anglia and received a Master of Arts in Journalism.

In Queeristan: LGBTQ Inclusion in the Indian Workplace (2020), Parmesh Shahani wrote about meeting Aditya in 2019, describing him as a “young openly gay poet” from Jabalpur whose family’s acceptance empowered him to create “his own queer-friendly universe.” Shahani also noted his debut poetry collection, April is Lush, which was published in 2019. The collection has since been archived in the Queer Cultural Resource Directory maintained by the Centre for Studies in Gender and Sexuality at Ashoka University and has received recognition in Lambda Literary Review in the United States.

Aditya's poetry and activism gained wider attention in 2021 when GQ included him among its "5 Indian Instagram poets". In 2023, Cosmopolitan featured him in its "The Ones to Watch" issue. The same year, Elle described Aditya as "a poet who holds the key to the world of words".

In 2023, Aditya's anthology Over the Rainbow: India’s Queer Heroes was published by Juggernaut Books during India’s marriage equality hearings. Notable figures featured in the anthology include novelist Vikram Seth and restaurateur Ritu Dalmia (who challenged Section 377 in courts), India's first openly gay activist Ashok Row Kavi, Dalit-transgender activist Grace Banu, filmmaker Rituparno Ghosh, transgender rights activist Laxmi Narayan Tripathi, athlete Dutee Chand, and lawyers Menaka Guruswamy and Arundhati Katju, who challenged Section 377 before the Supreme Court of India. The book was featured by The Indian Express as a top Pride Month read. The Hindu described it as “lucidly written,” and Hindustan Times noted that it “presents the stories of 19 queer people who have done their bit to bring about positive change in society.”

He has spoken at various literary festivals, including the Hyderabad Literary Festival, Bengaluru Poetry Festival and New Delhi's Rainbow Lit Fest, one of India's largest LGBT literary festivals. Aditya actively engages in advocacy for the rights of the lesbian, gay, bisexual, and transgender (LGBT) community. He has regularly appeared on BBC Newsbeat (Radio 1, 1Xtra, Asian Network) and BBC Radio 4, discussing LGBT rights, including the Supreme Court of India's ruling on same-sex marriage.

In his 2025 TEDx talk, How Expression Becomes Survival, he discussed surviving homophobia in a small town, crediting “unapologetic” self-belief in an unseen future with having parlayed his isolation into opportunities on global platforms, including roles at the BBC in the UK. His work has appeared in several national and international publications, including The Times of India, Hindustan Times, PinkNews, The Telegraph, VICE, Outlook, The New Indian Express, and The Wire.

In 2022, he produced and hosted a six-part radio series on the BBC, focusing on men’s mental health and featuring conversations with contributors from diverse backgrounds. Several media outlets reported that, with this programme, he became the first openly queer Indian to host a podcast for the BBC, engaging themes of race, sexuality, identity, and mental wellbeing. That same year, he also worked with the BBC Asian Network.

He later served as a producer at BBC Radio Cambridgeshire in 2024, and in 2025 was one of twelve journalists from India and Germany selected to participate in an Indo-German journalists' exchange programme organised by the Goethe-Institut in partnership with Deutsche Welle (DW), Germany's international broadcaster, and aimed at rebuilding trust in the media. The programme resulted in the publication of a handbook addressing key challenges facing journalism in Germany and India.

In 2026, Aditya published the poetry collection All That's Left Behind with Simon & Schuster. The collection was launched at Kunzum Books in New Delhi in conversation with writer and politician Anish Gawande, and marked a shift from the outward-facing approach of his earlier work towards writing more directly about family, grief, desire and queer love. The poems often approach these subjects through ordinary things, including a father's Bajaj scooter, a desert cooler, a mango tree and the sound of rain on a railway platform. Tiwari has described such objects as "living archives", carrying histories of class, place and belonging. Many of the poems draw on his childhood in Jabalpur, which he has described as "largely absent from the dominant imagination of Anglophone poetry", writing that his poems "carry that world in them". The poems depict queer love without disguise or euphemism, giving space to tenderness, desire and domestic life alongside experiences of absence and loss.

The book received praise from several poets. Bhanu Kapil described it as a "luminous collection" and found in the poems a world where "forest, face and name are absorbed in succession", where "nights or occasions convene themselves with immense tenderness", and where "impossible compressions accrue until they, too, begin to speak". Arundhathi Subramaniam wrote that the work retained a voice still willing to sing of desire, one capable of "ripping skies open", while Daljit Nagra said that the collection imagined "the mythic, the political and the personal with a relish for language", its compact forms "modeling a determination to endure".

In October 2026, Aditya presented a copy of the collection to Vivek Tankha, Member of Parliament, Rajya Sabha. Tankha later posted on Facebook that Aditya had brought the stories and sentiments of Jabalpur to a global audience.

== Honours and awards ==
In 2022, Aditya was named one of Outlook’s “75 Changemakers of Modern India” as part of the magazine’s 75th Independence Day series, which recognised Indians who had made a difference to their communities. In 2026, he received the India-UK Achievers Honours as an “Outstanding Achiever” in the Media and Journalism category at the House of Lords in London. In the same year, he was shortlisted for the Toto Award for Creative Writing in English.

== Selected works ==
- Tiwari, Aditya (2019). April is Lush. BlueRose Publishers Pvt. Limited. ISBN 978-93-5347-349-5.
- Tiwari, Aditya (2023). Over the Rainbow: India's Queer Heroes. Juggernaut Books. ISBN 978-93-5345-175-2.
- Tiwari, Aditya (2026). All That's Left Behind. Simon & Schuster. ISBN 978-93-9034-335-5.

== See also ==
- List of LGBT writers
- Indian poetry in English
- LGBT rights in India
