= Policy Aptitude Test =

- Acronym: PAT
- Administrator: National Law School of India University, Bengaluru
- Skills tested: General Knowledge, Numerical Problem Solving, Policy Aptitude, Logical Reasoning and English Language; Policy Analysis Ability and English Comprehension
- Purpose: Admission to post-graduate degree Master of Public Policy (MPP) in National Law School of India University, Bengaluru
- Year started: 2014
- Duration: 2 hours.
- Score validity: 1 year
- Offered: Once a year (usually in May)
- Regions: 4 centres in 4 cities
- Languages: English
- Prerequisites: Candidates with a graduate degree from any discipline (10+2+3 or 10+2+4 or 10+2+5).
- Fee: ₹1,000 (US$10)
- Used by: National Law School of India University, Bengaluru
- Website: mpp.nls.ac.in/selection-process.php (for PAT 2015).

The Policy Aptitude Test (PAT) is an offline written test held in India. This test scores a person on the bases of General Knowledge, Numerical Problem Solving, Policy Aptitude, Logical Reasoning, English Language and Policy Analysis Ability. The National Law School of India University, Bengaluru (NLSIU) started this exam and use the test for selecting students for its Public Policy Programme. The test is conducted every year.

== Exam format ==
Policy Aptitude Test (PAT) have two parts. First part is multiple choice section with negative marking. Second part is descriptive analytical writing about a policy issue. Only those who obtain minimum of 40% of marks in the first part will be evaluated for the second part.

First part of Policy Aptitude Test have five components: General Knowledge, Numerical Problem Solving, Policy Aptitude, Logical Reasoning and English Language. Each component have 20 questions. Each question carries 1 mark, and negative marking is -0.25. All components have equal weight.

Second part of Policy Aptitude Test is for 50 marks and it concerns descriptive writing about an issue that is provided. The second part examine candidate's policy analysis ability as well as English comprehension. Both parts together, Policy Aptitude Test carries 150 marks. Total duration of Policy Aptitude Test is of two hours.

== See also ==
- National Law School of India University, Bengaluru
- Common Admission Test (CAT)
- Graduate Management Admission Test (GMAT)
- Graduate Aptitude Test in Engineering (GATE)
- Graduate Record Examination (GRE)
- Test of English as a Foreign Language (TOEFL)
- International English Language Testing System (IELTS)
