= V. Vijayakumar =

Nepalese university chancellor

V. Vijaykumar

Personal details
- Occupation: Professor, Former Vice-Chancellor
- Profession: Teaching, Administration

V. Vijayakumar is the Vice Chancellor of National Law Institute University, Bhopal. He was a professor in National Law School of India University. He is the former vice chancellor, Dr. Ambedkar Law University, Chennai between 29 July 2010 and 28 July 2013. He is a distinguished visitor of various universities. He suggested many changes for improvement of Legal Education in India. His areas of specialization include Constitutional Law, Administrative Law, Human Rights Law, Law of Elections, Refugee and Humanitarian Law. He held the UNHCR Chair on Refugee Law and has keen interest in IT administration and infrastructure. He is in the board of several National Law Schools steering various policy issues. He is the member of Academic Council of National Law University, Delhi As of 2023, he teaches an elective course on Election Law.

== Education ==
- B.A. (Political Science, 1972) from the University of Madras
- M.A. (Political Science, 1975) from the University of Madras
- B.L. (1978), M.Phil. (Political Science, 1984) from the University of Madras
- M.L. (International Law and Constitutional Law, 1986) from the University of Madras
- Ph.D. (International Law and Constitutional Law, 1996) from the University of Madras
- M.A. (Public Administration, 1984) from Sri Venkateshwara University, Tirupati.

== Career ==
He was appointed as assistant professor of law at the NLSIU in 1988, as associate professor in 1992 and Professor of Law in 1997. Prior to joining NLSIU he was assistant professor of political science at the Presidency College, Madras, between September 1978 and May 1988. He was the registrar of NLSIU between 2005 and 2008. He holds the UNHCR Chair on Refugee Law since April 1997. He was a member of Karnataka State Higher Education Council between 2012 and 2016. He is presently serving as the vice chancellor of National Law Institute University, Bhopal, Madhya Pradesh, after being appointed to the post in May 2018.

== Publications ==
He has published more than 47 articles in national and international journals and has contributed to a couple of books as well. He was chairman, Under-Graduate Council between 1997 and 1999 and of the Post-Graduate Council between 2003 and 2005 at NLSIU.

== Awards ==
He was awarded Ryōichi Sasakawa Young Leaders Fellowship at the Salzburg Seminar in 1993. He was a visiting scholar with York University, Toronto, Canada at its Centre for Refugee Studies during 2000–2003 and was exchange visitor at National University of Singapore during November 2004 to February 2005 under the Asian Law Institute programme. He visited the U.S. in 1988 under the International Visitor's Programme of the USIS on ‘The Living Constitution’. Representing the Law School, he was a member of the board of governors of the Asian Law Institute located in Singapore National University till 2009. He was conferred the ‘Amity Academic Excellence Award’ during February 2011 by the Amity International Business School of the Amity University, Noida. For the ‘Best Performance’ in respect of the Youth Red Cross Movement, he received an award from the Indian Red Cross Society, Tamil Nadu branch on the World Red Cross Day in 2012. Again the same Indian Red Cross Society presented the ‘Best Vice Chancellor Award 2011–2012’ at the 63rd Anniversary of the Geneva Conventions Day on 23 August 2012.
