= Join the Bar =

2011 novel by Brajesh Rajak

Join the Bar: A tale about 3 law students
- Cover of Join the Bar: A tale about 3 law students by Brajesh Rajak.
- Author: Brajesh Rajak
- Language: English
- Genre: Fiction
- Publisher: Universal Law Publishing Co. Pvt. Ltd.
- Publication date: 2011
- Publication place: India
- Media type: Print ( Paperback)
- Pages: 195
- ISBN: 978-93-5035-022-5
- Preceded by: Pornography Law: XXX Must not be Tolerated
- Followed by: Caste, Gender Inequality and Social Work

Join the Bar is a 2011 novel written by Brajesh Rajak, a final year student of National Law School of India University, Bangalore. It is a fictional account of the lives of three law students in a premier law institute in India. This novel is considered to be the first novel based on the legal education system in India. Brajesh Rajak has also written a law book titled "XXX Must not be Tolerated."

== Reception ==
The novel received mixed reviews from readers. Lawyer's update described the novel as an early blossom of Brajesh Rajak's talent. Rainmaker's Mylaw.com criticised it for too many twists in the plot but also praised it for the hard work that the author has put in to give voice to issues of concern at a certain law school. Some readers criticized it for being exceedingly honest while dealing with the problems of a certain law school. An agreement of love published in the book is appreciated and quoted by many bloggers including legallyindia.com.
