= University of Allahabad =

Central university in Prayagraj, India

- Seal of the University of Allahabad
- Motto: Latin: Quot Rami Tot Arbores
- Motto in English: "As Many Branches So Many Trees"
- Type: Public
- Established: 23 September 1887; 139 years ago
- Affiliations: UGC; AIU; ACU; NAAC
- Chancellor: Ashish Kumar Chauhan
- Vice-Chancellor: Sangita Srivastava
- Rector: Governor of Uttar Pradesh
- Visitor: President of India
- Academic staff: 310
- Students: 17,727
- Postgraduates: 9,447
- Doctoral students: 588
- Location: Prayagraj, Uttar Pradesh, India; 25.466523°N 81.859423°E
- Campus: Urban, 232 acres (0.94 km^{2})
- Colours: Red
- Website: www.allduniv.ac.in

The University of Allahabad is a central university located in Prayagraj, in Uttar Pradesh, India. It was established on 23 September 1887 by an act of Parliament and is recognised as an Institute of National Importance (INI). It is the regarded as the fourth oldest modern university in India. Its origins lie in the Muir Central College, named after Lt. Governor of North-Western Provinces Sir William Muir in 1873, who suggested the idea of a Central University at Allahabad, which later evolved to the present university. Its status as a central university was re-established through the University of Allahabad Act 2005 by the Parliament of India.

== History ==
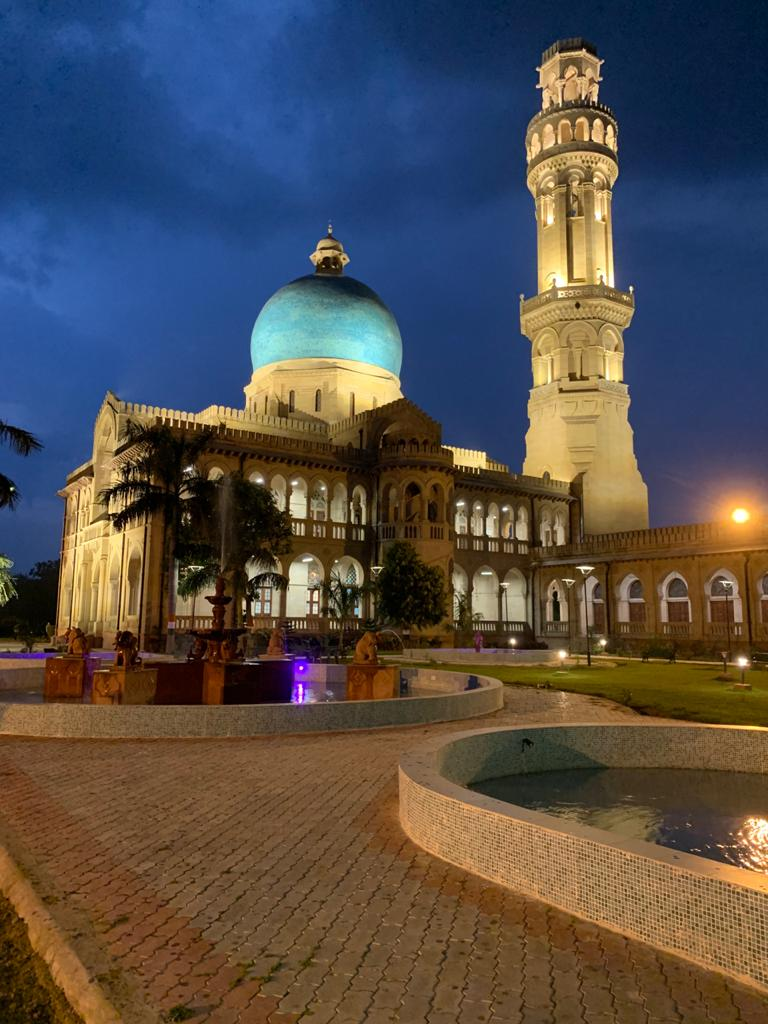
Vizianagaram Hall, Faculty of Science

The foundation stone of the Muir Central College was laid by Governor-General of India, Lord Northbrook on 9 December 1873. The college was named after Sir William Muir, Lt. Governor of United Province, who was the key person in its foundation. The building was designed by William Emerson, who also designed Victoria Memorial in Kolkata and Crawford Market in Mumbai in a combination of Indo-Saracenic, Egyptian and Gothic styles.

Initially, it functioned under the University of Calcutta and later, on 23 September 1887, the University of Allahabad was established, making it the fifth university established in colonial India after Calcutta university, Bombay university, Madras university, and Lahore's Punjab university.

It began as an affiliating and examining body for graduate and postgraduate degrees with a classical orientation and the responsibility for secondary education as well. Between 1891 and 1922, Government Science College, Jabalpur, the oldest science college of India was affiliated to the university. By 1904 the university established its own teaching departments and instituted doctoral research programs. The University Senate hall was opened by the lieutenant-governor, Sir John Hewett, in 1912.

In 1921, with the announcement of the Allahabad University Act of 1921, the Muir Central College merged with the university, which was reorganized as a unitary teaching and residential university. Over the next few years its affiliated colleges were transferred to Agra University and the task of conducting secondary-level examinations was relocated.

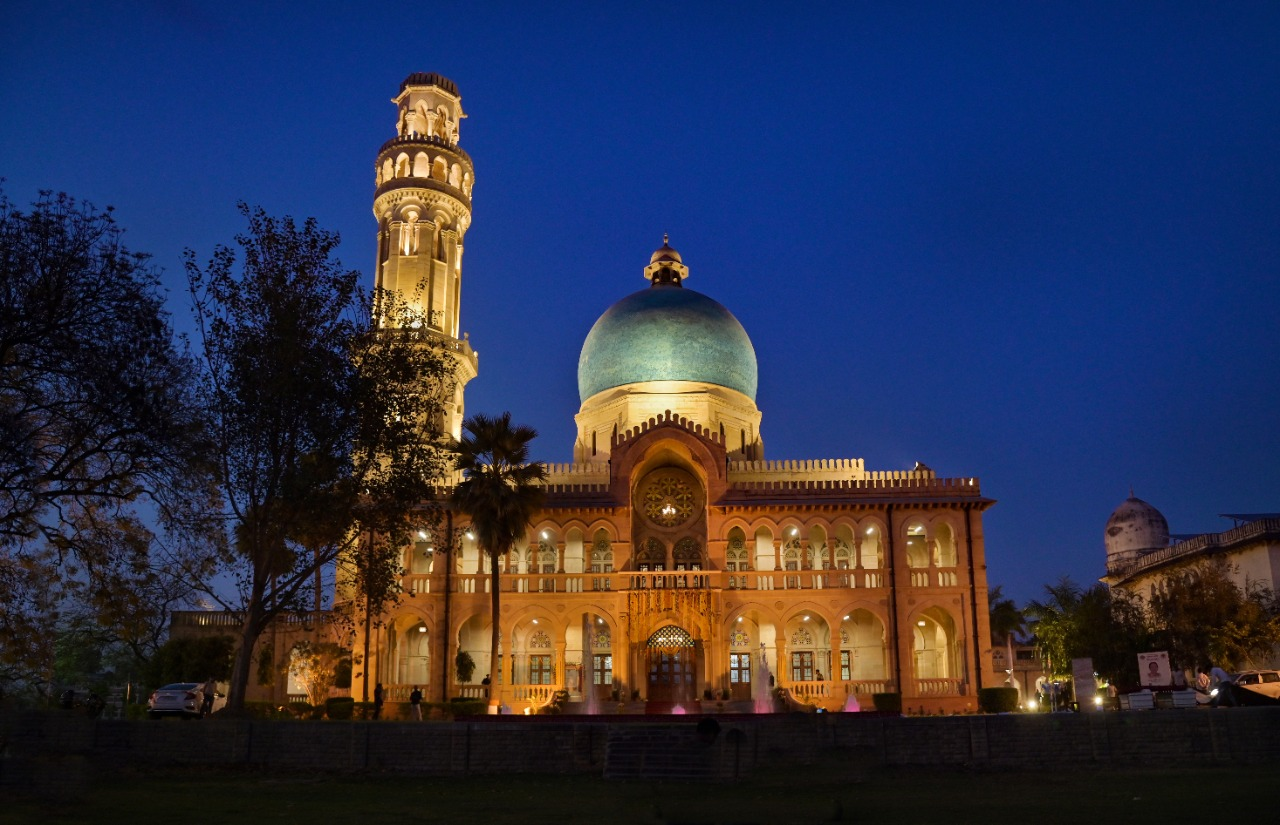
Night view of Vizianagaram Hall, University of Allahabad

In 1951, the university (while maintaining its fundamental unitary character) recognized certain local institutions as associated colleges authorized to teach undergraduate courses under the Faculty of Arts, Commerce, Science, and Law.

In view of these achievements, as well as its position among the universities of Uttar Pradesh, the state government accorded it formal recognition in July 1992 as a 'premier institution' (Vishesh Agrani Sanstha). During the university's centenary celebrations in 1987 there were demands from students, faculty, and employees for the granting of status as a central university.

In 2003 the union cabinet decided to restore the central universality status of the university. This central university status was finally restored in 2005, through The University of Allahabad Act by the Parliament of India, which also declared the university an Institution of National Importance.

It has been accredited by the National Assessment and Accreditation Council.

== Campus ==
The campus is spread around the city of Prayagraj across the area of Old Katra and Bank Road. It consists of major five faculties, namely Science, Arts, commerce, law, management faculties with the arts faculty housing the Administrative Block of Chatham Lines. It has numerous residential hostels for students.

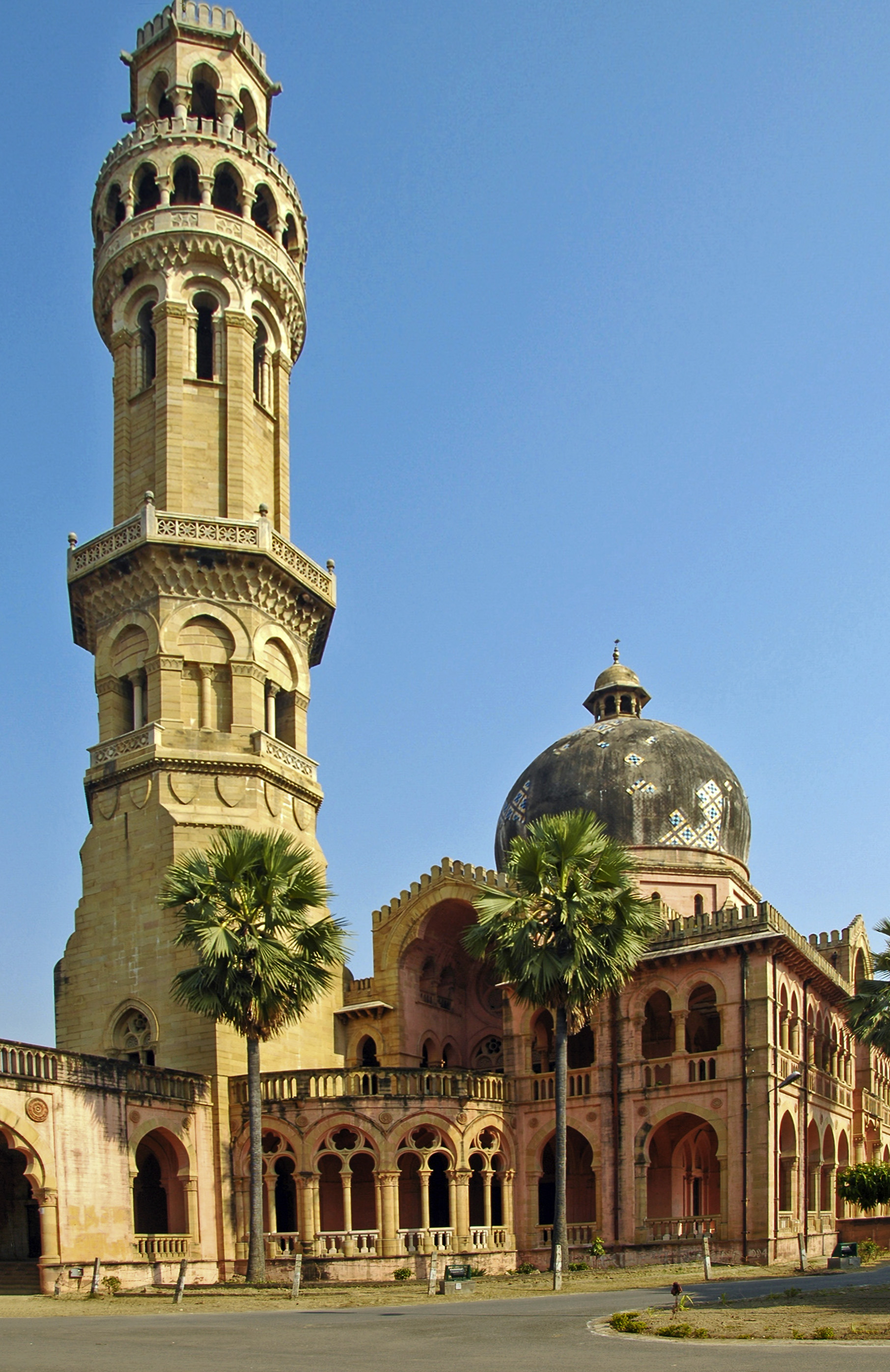
Vizianagaram Hall in 2007 (since renovated): part of Faculty of Science

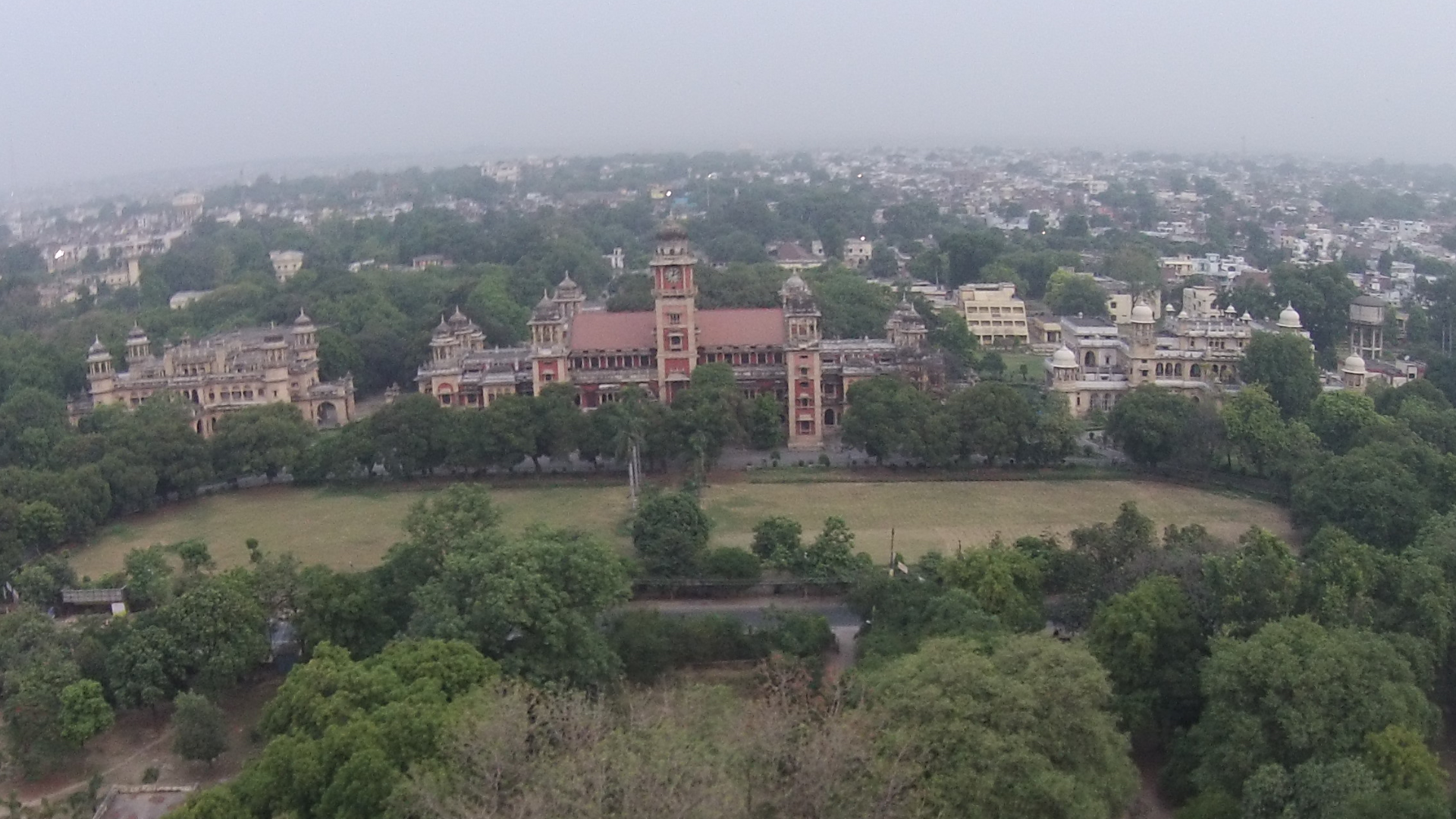
Aerial view of Senate Hall, University of Allahabad, Faculty of Art @Other.

== Organization and administration ==
=== Governance ===
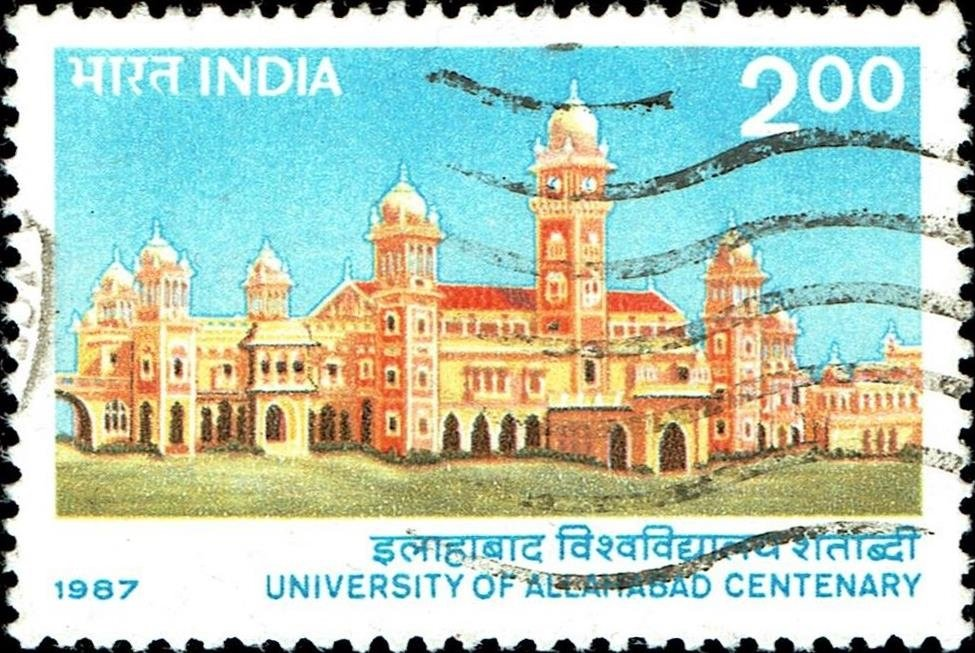
Indian Postage stamp of the University of Allahabad, 1987

The president of India is the visitor and the governor of Uttar Pradesh is the chief rector of the university. The chancellor is the ceremonial head of the university while the executive powers rest with the vice-chancellor. The Court, the Executive Council, the Academic Council, the Board of Faculties and the Finance Committee are the administrative authorities of the university.

The University Court is the supreme authority of the university and has the power to review the broad policies and programs of the university, as well as to suggest measures for its improvement and development. The Executive Council serves as the highest executive body of the university. The Academic Council, the highest academic body, is responsible for coordinating and exercising general supervision over the university's academic policies. It has the right to advise the Executive Council on all academic matters. The Finance Committee is tasked with recommending financial policies, goals, and budgets.

In November 2020, Professor Sangita Srivastava was appointed as the new regular vice chancellor of Allahabad University. She was the first woman appointed to this post at the university.

=== Colleges ===
The following colleges are component of Allahabad University:

- Allahabad Degree College
- Arya Kanya Degree College
- Chaudhary Mahadeo Prasad Post Graduate College
- Ewing Christian College (Autonomous Minority College)
- Govind Ballabh Pant Social Science Institute
- Hamidia Girls' Degree College
- Ishwar Saran Degree College
- Jagat Taran Girls' Degree College
- K.P Training College
- Rajarshi Tandon Girls' Degree College
- S.S. Khanna Girls Degree College
- S.P.M. Govt. Degree College

== Academic profile ==
=== Rankings ===
University rankings

Allahabad University has been accessed and accredited to grade "A+" by NAAC.The university is ranked 240 in Asian Rankings - Southern Asia by QS World University Rankings as of 2025.

In National Institutional Ranking Framework, it was between ranked 201-300 for engineering in 2024 and 100-125 for management in 2025.

=== Research ===
Department of Psychology, University of Allahabad features a scholarly journal in collaboration with Sage Publications known as the Psychology and Developing Societies. The Centre of Behavioural and Cognitive Sciences, an independent research centre affiliated to Allahabad, is a leader in the field of cognitive sciences.

== Notable alumni and faculty members ==
- Dr. Zakir Hussain, 3rd President of India and one of the Founder Members of Jamia Millia Islamia
- V. P. Singh, former Prime Minister of India
- S. R. Goyal, Indian historian
- Chandra Shekhar, former Prime Minister of India
- Madan Mohan Malaviya, founder of Banaras Hindu University
- Govind Ballabh Pant, former Chief Minister of Uttar Pradesh
- Shankar Dayal Sharma, former President of India
- R. N. Kao, former IPS officer, founder and first director of R&AW
- Ranganath Misra, former chief justice of India
- Rajendra Kumari Bajpai, former union minister of India, former Lieutenant Governor of Puducherry
- Onkar Singh, former Vice Chancellor of Veer Madho Singh Bhandari Uttarakhand Technical University and Founder Vice Chancellor of Madan Mohan Malaviya University of Technology, Gorakhpur
- Anand Singh, former Member of Parliament, MLA, and Minister of Agriculture and Religious affairs, in Uttar Pradesh
- Murli Manohar Joshi, former Union Home Minister and former Union Minister of Science and Technology and Human Resource Development
- Mahadevi Verma, great writer and poet
- Firaq Gorakhpuri, great writer and poet
- Zamin Ali, great educator and poet
- Harivansh Rai Bachchan, great author and poet
- Sanjeev Kumar Yadav, law enforcement.
- Prem Chand Pandey, Scientist, Academic and Founding Director, National Centre for Polar and Ocean Research, Goa
- Rashmi Sinha, Cofounder of SlideShare
- Yogesh Pratap Singh, Constitutional Law Scholar and Vice-Chancellor, National Law University Tripura.
