= R. Venkata Rao (law professor) =

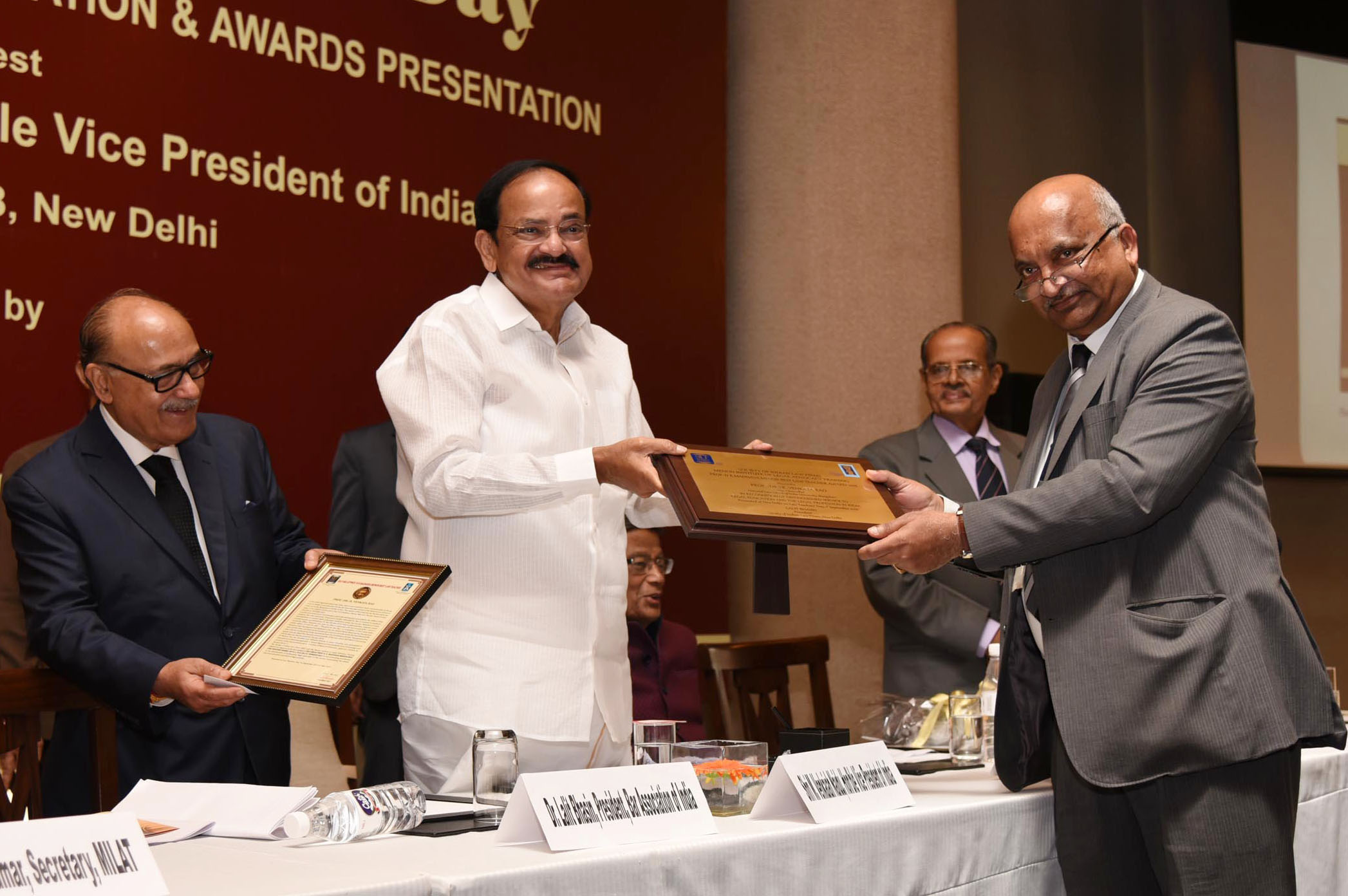
- M. Venkaiah Naidu presenting Professor N.R. Madhava Menon, Best Law Teacher Award for 2018 to Prof. R. Venkata Rao, Vice Chancellor of National Law School of India, Bengaluru

Vice Chancellor, India International University of Education and Research, Goa
- In office 14/03/2023 – Till Date

Chairperson, Vivekananda School of Law and Legal Studies & Vivekananda Institute of Professional Studies, Delhi
- In office 16/09/2019 – October, 2022

Personal details
- Born: 15 March 1954 (age 72)
- Occupation: Professor, Vice-Chancellor
- Profession: Teaching, Administration

R. Venkata Rao is the former Vice Chancellor of the National Law School of India University, Bangalore. He's now serving at the India International University of Legal Education and Research, Goa as the Vice Chancellor.

== Career ==
He has served for 31 years in the Faculty of Law, Andhra University in various capacities. He was Director of Centre of Criminal Justice Andhra University from 1997-2009. He served as the Vice-Chancellor of the National Law School of India University, Bangalore for a period of 10 years, 2 months and 21 days, before being appointed as the Chairperson of the Vivekananda School of Law and Legal Studies and Vivekananda schools of English Studies.
