= Ajay Gudavarthy =

Indian academic

Academic background
- Thesis: Fragmentation and Solidarity: A Study of Caste, Class and Gender Movements in Andhra Pradesh (2003)

Academic work
- Institutions: Jawaharlal Nehru University, National Law School of India University, National University of Juridical Sciences
- Notable works: Maoism, Democracy and Globalisation Cross-currents in Indian Politics; Politics of Post-Civil Society: Contemporary History of Political Movements in India.

Ajay Gudavarthy is a political theorist, analyst and columnist in India. He is associate professor in political science at Centre for Political Studies, Jawaharlal Nehru University, New Delhi.

== Education and family ==
Ajay Gudavarthy is the son of Prof G. Haragopal, an activist in the civil rights movement and former dean of University of Hyderabad.

Gudavarthy completed his PhD in 2002 from the Centre for Political Studies, Jawaharlal Nehru University, New Delhi under the supervision of Gurpreet Mahajan. His thesis was titled as "Fragmentation and Solidarity: A Study of Caste, Class and Gender Movements in Andhra Pradesh," which was a study of the interface between the three political movements, in light of new theoretical frameworks, with special reference to Critical Theory and Post-Marxism.

== Career ==
Gudavarthy's first teaching assignment was at the National University of Juridical Sciences, Calcutta from 2001 to 2003. He then taught as assistant professor at the National Law School of India University, Bangalore from 2003 to 2006. He joined Centre for Political Studies, Jawaharlal Nehru University, New Delhi in 2006. In 2008, he was Charles Wallace Visiting Fellow, the School of Oriental and African Studies (SOAS), London. He was a visiting fellow, Goldsmith College, University of London in 2010 and Visiting Faculty at Centre for Human Rights, University of Hyderabad in 2011. He had been a visiting fellow at Centre for Citizenship, Civil society and Rule of Law, University of Aberdeen in 2012.

== Contributions to Indian political studies ==
=== Secular sectarianism ===
Gudavarthy coined the term secular sectarianism, in his book Secular Sectarianism: Limits of Subaltern Politics. He conceptualizes secular sectarianism as a social condition in which those groups that attained social mobility, attempts to actively prevent the mobility of other marginalised social groups below them in hierarchy. He identifies the sub-caste conflicts among Dalits, Tribals, Other Backward Classes (OBC's ) in India and remarks it as the axes of intra-subaltern social conflict. He also views certain Muslim groups as steadfast in maintaining their social conservatism and refusing the policies of affirmative actions in minority institutions, marking the intra-subaltern social conflict.

=== Right wing populism ===
Gudavarthy's book India After Modi: Populism and the Right is considered the first theoretical study of right-wing populism in India from within the left-liberal intellectual tradition. In the special issue on Populism by academic journal Kairos: A Journal of Critical Symposium, his work was featured for Book Forum discussion, and scholars including Samir Gandesha, Anup Dhar, Deepanshu Mohan, Abhay Amal, Vikas Pathak and Prakash Kashwan engaged conceptually and critically with the book.

Gudavarthy had identified a convergence that is taking place in socio-political domain, including "the neo-liberal turn in the economy, a populist turn in democracy and a certain kind of enculturalisation mediatization in social and cultural realm." He believes that media plays significant role in this shift, particularly from data, evidence, and empirical accuracy to symbolic power. He also argued that Bharatiya Janata Party in 1990's and post-2016, though looks similar, but is vastly different in nature. He defined this disparity in terms of the BJP's acceptability. He said, "Vajpayee belonged to an era when the consent for hindutva politics was very limited, so he projected himself as the BJP’s Nehruvian face—as someone who was more accommodative—because he knew that popular consent was for the Congress style of politics."

== Selected works ==
- Secular Sectarianism: Limits of Subaltern Politics, (SAGE Publications: 2019).
- Re-framing Democracy and Agency in India: Interrogating Political Society, (SAGE Publications: 2013).
- Maoism, Democracy and Globalisation: Cross-currents in Indian Politics, (SAGE Publications, 2014).
- Politics of Post-civil Society: Contemporary History of Political Movements in India (SAGE Publications, 2013).
- Revolutionary Violence Versus Democracy: Narratives from India, (SAGE Publications, 2017).
- India After Modi: Populism and the Right, (Bloomsbury Publishing : 2018).
- Cultural Politics of Modern India, (Aakar Publication: 2015).

He has more than 50 scholarly articles in Indian and International academic Journals. He wrote a Hindi book, Bharat mein Rajneetik Andolano ka Samkaleen Itihaas: Nagrik Samaj ke baad ki rajneeti, (SAGE Publications: 2018), to uncover major concepts in political studies for vernacular students.

== Activism ==
Gudavarthy has appeared in visual and print media including Al Jazeera, US News and TR TWorld as a political commentator on India specific issues. He also takes political position about contemporary Indian politics and governments and writes in the editorials of Indian newspapers including The Indian Express, The Hindu, The Times of India, The Wire.

He came out in Solidarity with Anand Teltumbde and Gautam Navlakha and condemned their arrest in Elgar Parishad case. He was one of the signatories that urged democratic organizations and individuals to stand against the oppressive move by Indian government to curb the voices of dissent. He condemned the authoritarian turmoil in Indian campuses (e.g. Jawaharlal Nehru University, Delhi University and University of Hyderabad).

He criticized the Maoists movement in India for ignoring the cultural part in revolution and argued that legitimacy of the state as it exists today can be only undermined by working through the cultural idiom. He criticised the elitism of national law schools in India and spoke against the stigmatization of reservation (affirmative action) in such institutions. He argued that Indian Muslims face marginalisation in social, economic and political spheres.

He attacked the Bharatiya Janata Party for misusing premier investigating agencies such as the Central Bureau of Investigation (CBI) to pursue cases against those who are not willing to toe their line. He said that they use the combination of ‘money’ and lawsuits to either buy or intimidate the legislators from other political parties. He viewed farmers protest against prime minister Modi as an example of 'legitimacy crisis.' He also criticized Modi government for censoring doctors during covid pandemic and alleged that government was attempting to create "a sense of false self-image that covers up its limitations". He slammed Prahlad Patel, the Union minister of state for culture for the complaint about the insult to the Tricolour inflicted by Delhi chief minister Arvind Kejriwal during his daily webcasts during the pandemic. He said, "its just another diversion from the pandemic for which people are deeply disturbed, especially in BJP-ruled states like Uttar Pradesh which go to the polls next year."

=== Criticism ===
Gudavarthy faced criticism for his remarks that Dalit politics is taking a ‘rightward shift’ in India. His contrasting of farm protests with the anti-CAA movement and the argument that the latter failed to appeal to a majority of Indians since its concerns remained uniquely centred around Muslims, was criticized for putting the onus and blame for not receiving wider ‘moral acceptability’ on the on survivors of majoritarian violence in India.
