= Ananda Mohan Bhattarai =

Nepalese judge

Hon'ble Ananda Mohan Bhattarai आनन्दमोहन भट्टराई

Justice of Supreme Court of Nepal
- Incumbent
- Assumed office 1 August 2016

Personal details
- Born: 15 June 1959 (age 67) Kaski, Nepal
- Education: Massachusetts Institute of Technology; Max Planck Institute for Comparative Public Law and International Law
- Occupation: Justice

Ananda Mohan Bhattarai (Nepali: डा. आनन्दमोहन भट्टराई) is a Nepalese judge. He is a former justice of the Supreme Court of Nepal.

== Education ==
Bhattarai completed his Doctor of Jurisprudence (J.S.D) from National Law School of India University in 2000. He went to Massachusetts Institute of Technology, USA (2002-2003) under the Hubert H. Humphrey Fellowship for a program on law, human rights and public policy at the Department of Urban Studies and Planning, Special program for Urban and Regional Studies of Developing Areas. He subsequently went to Max Planck Institute for Comparative Public Law and International Law Heidelberg, Germany (2005-2006, 2008, 2011,2018) under the Alexander von Humboldt Foundation Fellowship for Post-doctoral study and research.

He has L.L.M in Business law from National Law School of India University, 1997. He has M.A in English Literature (1994), M.A in Political Science (1984) and Diploma in Law (1980) from Tribhuvan University.

== Career ==
Designation	Organization/Institution	Tenure Period
Justice	Supreme Court of Nepal	1 August 2016 – 14 June 2024
Chief Judge	Court of Appeal, Biratnagar and Patan	August 2014 – July 2016
Acting Chief Judge	Court of Appeal, Tulsipur	August 2013 – August 2014
Judge	Court of Appeal	January 2006 - August 2013
District Judge	District Court Kathmandu, Syangja, Achham, Manang and Kapilvastu	September 1994 - January 2006
Deputy Registrar	Supreme Court of Nepal	1992 - 1994
Officer	At different courts	1980-1992

== Publications ==
=== Books ===
Bhattarai has a numerous published books.

- DISPLACEMENT AND REHABILITATION IN NEPAL: Law and Policy and Practice, (2001)
- COMMUNITIES, FORESTS AND LAWS OF NEPAL (2005)
- PROTECTION OF HIMALAYAN BIODIVERSITY, International Environmental Law and a Regional Legal Framework (2010)
- JUDICIAL ETHICS AND CODE OF CONDUCT OF JUDGES IN NEPAL, NJA 2013.

=== Other publications ===
Bhattarai has contributed to a number of chapters, research articles and reports in various national and international publications.

Chapters in Books/ Handbooks:

- Role of Judiciary in the Enforcement of Economic, Social and Cultural Rights: Experience from Nepal (with Hon. Kalyan Shrestha) in HUMAN RIGHTS AND CONFLICT (Inke Boerefijn et al. eds.) (Cambridge Intersentia, 2011)
- Judicial Education and Skills Development for Judges and Court Staff-The Nepal Experience in JUDICIAL REFORM HANDBOOK (Oxford University Press, 2008)
- Rule of Law and Good Governance in GOOD GOVERNANCE, Pro-Public, Kathmandu, 2001(Nepali text)
- Negotiating Regional Bio- Issues in the Himalaya in Negotiating a Sustainable Future: Innovations in International Environmental Negotiations" – Vol. 12 ON Books Harvard University, ( William Moomaw, Lawrence Susskind and Kristen Kurczak ed. 2003) "
- Towards a Legal Framework: Policy Dimensions, Developing Decentralized Institutions in MAKING WATER EVERYBODY’S BUSINESS (Anil Agrawal et al. eds) Delhi, Center for Science and Environment 2000

Research as Principal Investigator:

- Organized Crimes: An Introduction (Resource Material) Published by National Judicial Academy (Chapter Author) 2011 (Nepali text)
- Execution of Judgements: Problems and Possible Solutions (Chief Investigator) National Judicial Academy 2008 (Nepali text)
- Rome Treaty of International Criminal Court and Prevailing Criminal Laws of Nepal: A Study (Chief Investigator) National Judicial Academy 2008 (Nepali Text)

Articles/Papers/Reports:

- Constitutional Rights and Social Exclusion in Nepal (with Malcolm Langford), in 18 INTERNATIONAL JOURNAL ON MINORITY AND GROUP RIGHTS 18 (2011).

Speeches:

- Global Law Conference: Technical session on Air Pollution at Chandigarh University
- 2nd Asian Judges Symposium on Environment 3 December 2013, Asian Development Bank HQ, Manila, Philippines: Asian Judges Network on Environment
- Environmental Constitutionalism in Nepal: Harvard Law School, February 2024

== Published decisions ==
Two of his judgements have been published on LANDMARK JUDGMENTS ON VIOLENCE AGAINST WOMEN AND CHILDREN FROM SOUTH ASIA, (Delhi, South Asia Regional Initiative, SARIQ 2004) He has made important contributions to the issue of environment preservation, rights of different communities, gender justice and LGBTQ rights in Nepal.

== Affiliations ==
Bhattarai was a founding editor of NJA Law Journal. He also served as the editor on 'Landmark Decisions of the Supreme Court on Gender Justice, National Judicial Academy 2010'

- Member SAARC Law, Nepal Chapter
- Vice President, Judges Society, Nepal (2014-2016)

== Awards ==
Bhattarai is a recipient of various awards such as:

- Alexander von Humboldt Fellowship, AVH Foundation, Germany 2005-06, 2008, 2011, 2018.
- Hubert H. Humphrey Fellowship Program for Mid-Career Professional Study in the United States, US Department of State Award, 2002–03
- Colombo Plan Fellowship from the Government of India for LL.M studies, 1994-1997
- Best Book of the Year Award by the Bar Council of Nepal, 2001 for the book on "Displacement and Rehabilitation in Nepal"
- Mahendra Vidhya Bhushan (Class A) by the King of Nepal, for carrying out outstanding doctoral study, 2001
- Mahendra Vidhya Bhushan (Class B) by the King of Nepal for standing first in the LLM studies, 2001
- Gorkha Dakshin Bahu (Class III) by the King of Nepal for making outstanding contribution as a judge of Kathmandu District Court, 2001

== See also ==
- Supreme Court of Nepal
