= Kalyan Chakravarthy Kankanala =

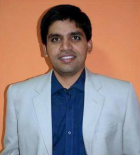
- Born: 4 July 1978 (age 48); Gurazala, Andhra Pradesh, India
- Education: National Law School of India University; Franklin Pierce Law Center; Osmania University
- Occupations: IP attorney, author
- Website: Kalyan C Kankanala

Kalyan Chakravarthy Kankanala (born 4 July 1978, in Gurazala, Andhra Pradesh) is an Indian author and intellectual property attorney. He writes both non-fictional and fictional books on intellectual property and patent law. Kalyan is an Advisory Board member of the Centre for Excellence in IP and Standards at National Law School of India University.

== Biography ==
=== Early life ===
Kalyan attended Loyola Public School near Guntur, India, after which he went to a medical school. A genetic eye disorder characterized by progressive loss of vision, forced him to pull out of the medical course, following which he decided to pursue law. He holds a Bachelor in Law degree from Osmania University and a masters in intellectual property law degree at the Franklin Pierce Law Center. He obtained a doctorate in patent law, with specialization in genomics, from the National Law School of India University, Bangalore.

=== Career ===
Kalyan started his writing career with his first book, Genetic Patent Law and Strategy, and later wrote Indian Patent Law and Practice, and wrote Indian Patent Law and Practice, published by the Oxford University Press.

Subsequently he ventured into legal fiction. His first fiction novel, Road Humps and Sidewalks, was a legal thriller about pharmaceutical drugs, patents and healthcare, all highly debated topics in the Indian context. Kalyan's second legal thriller, Pirates of Bollywood, premised on film production, piracy and organized crime, released on 1 January 2015. He releases audio versions of his literary works for the benefit of the visually challenged.

Kalyan is currently the managing partner, Chief IP Attorney of an IP firm he founded, BananaIP Counsels, Headquartered in Bangalore, India. He consults for the United Nations Industrial Development Organization (UNIDO), and also teaches IP courses at the National Law School of India University, Bangalore, as well as the Indian Institute of Management, Bangalore. Dr. Kalyan has been instrumental in getting accessibility guidelines issued by the Indian Intellectual Property Office.

== Books ==
- Genetic Patent Law and Strategy (2007) ISBN 978-8189542269
- Indian Patent Law and Practice (2011) ISBN 978-0198089605
- IP Client Strategies in the Asia-Pacific (2011) ISBN 978-0314277619
- Fun IP, Fundamentals of Intellectual Property (2012) ISBN 978-9350678886
- Road Humps and Sidewalks – Patent Law Thriller (2013) ISBN 978-1492886419
- How many are these? (2014) ISBN 978-9383701087
- Pirates of Bollywood – Copyright Law Thriller (2015) ISBN 978-9351963271
- The Oath: When Medicine Clashes with Law (2016) ISBN 978-1530889976
- Understanding Accessibility (2023) ISBN 9798215564547
