= The Other Side of Diplomacy =

2025 anthology edited by Jayshree Misra Tripathi

- Editor: Jayshree Misra Tripathi
- Genre: Anthology
- Publisher: Westland Books
- Publication date: 17 February 2025
- Publication place: India
- Pages: 182
- ISBN: 9789360459895

The Other Side of Diplomacy is a 2025 anthology edited by Jayshree Misra Tripathi, published by Westland Non-Fiction. The book compiles firsthand accounts from 15 diplomatic spouses, including two husbands and some daughters, detailing their experiences supporting Indian Foreign Service (IFS) officers across diverse global postings. Spanning locations such as Sikkim, Ethiopia, South Africa, Zimbabwe, Tajikistan, Baghdad, China, Switzerland, and Brazil, the anthology explores the challenges, sacrifices, and contributions of these individuals in the unofficial practice of diplomacy. Released on February 17, 2025, the book has been recognised for its unique perspective on the personal side of diplomatic life and its role in India’s soft power.

== Content and themes ==
The anthology features 16 essays recounting historic, entertaining, and insightful episodes from the lives of diplomatic spouses. These narratives highlight their adaptability to unfamiliar cultures, management of household and social duties, and contributions to India’s global image through cultural diplomacy.

Notable anecdotes include preparing Indian meals for Pandit Ravi Shankar in Beijing, catering for Ethiopian elites post-reception, and interactions with figures like Nelson Mandela, King Juan Carlos of Spain, and John F. Kennedy. The book also addresses evolving gender norms, with accounts from male spouses who took on traditionally female roles, such as accompanying dignitaries’ spouses or managing family responsibilities. It reflects on the emotional toll of frequent relocations, cross-cultural challenges, and the pressure to avoid diplomatic gaffes while upholding national prestige.

== Editor and contributors ==
Jayshree Misra Tripathi, a poet and retired diplomatic spouse, curated the anthology.

The book includes contributions from Ajay Shankar, Anita Sapra, Anuradha Muthukumar, Ashok Pandey, Asiya Hamid Rao, Hema Devare, Kusum Budhwar, Kusum Tayal, Margreta Kumar, Preeti Singh, Reshmi Ray Dasgupta, Sharmila Kantha, Shreedevi Nair Pal, Shrimi Sinha, and Smita Purushottam.

== Publication and release ==
Published by Westland Non-Fiction, a division of Nasadiya Technologies Pvt Ltd, the book spans 182 pages and is priced at INR 599. It was launched on February 17, 2025, at the India International Centre in New Delhi, with a panel featuring Ambassador Shyam Saran, MP Shashi Tharoor, and the editor.

== Reception ==
The Other Side of Diplomacy has received positive reviews for its engaging storytelling and historical value. Asian Lite praised its "intimate and nuanced look" at diplomatic spouses’ lives, emphasizing their role in India’s soft power. IANS highlighted compelling anecdotes, such as a fashion mishap in Switzerland and diplomatic contributions to Bangladesh’s creation. The Tribune described it as a unique anthology in India, though it noted the title might mislead readers expecting foreign policy analysis.
