= R Sri Kumar =

Indian police officer

- Born: 28 January 1949 (age 77)
- Education: IIT Madras; National Law School of India University
- Awards: Indian Police Medal; President's Police Medal

R Sri Kumar is a vigilance commissioner in the Central Vigilance Commission, India. He assumed the role on September 8, 2010.

== Education ==
R Sri Kumar completed his B Tech in Electrical Engineering at IIT Madras in 1970. He graduated with a Master of Business degree from National Law School of India University, Bangalore in 2003 .

== Professional life ==
R Sri Kumar joined the Indian Police Service in 1973, after a brief stint in the Central Public Works Department. He served in various capacities in Uttar Pradesh from 1973 to 1982. He worked as SP Vigilance, SP Pratapgarh and Chief Security Officer of Uttar Pradesh State Road Transport Corporation before moving to Karnataka on cadre transfer in April 1982.

His service in Karnataka began as Superintendent of Police, Bangalore. From 1985 to 1996, he worked as SP/CBI, Bangalore, DIG/CBI, Delhi, DIG/SIT, Madras. In June 1996, he was promoted to the rank of IGP and served as Commissioner for Traffic & Road Safety in the office of the DG & IGP, Karnataka State. From 1996 to 2000, while working as Director (Security & Vigilance), Karnataka State Road Transport Corporation, he brought about structural reforms in KSRTC. He worked as Inspector General of Police in Corps of Detectives, Bangalore, for a year before becoming the Chairman & Managing Director, Karnataka State Police Housing Corporation, Bangalore in July 2001. He continued to work in this post up to 2008, but for a brief stint as Commandant General, Home Guards, Ex-Officio Director, Civil Defence & Director, Fire & Emergency Services until 2008, when he became the Director General of Police, Karnataka State. He retired as DGP Karnataka in January 2009.

His accomplishments in police service include setting up the country's first cyber crime police station in Bangalore, obtaining ISO quality, environmental and green building certification for the Karnataka State Police Housing Corporation and playing a vital role in the successful investigations of many crimes of interstate and international ramifications. He is also known for using technology to crack some of the most high-profile cases like the assassination of former Prime Minister Rajiv Gandhi, the 1992 Harshad Mehta scam and the Abdul Karim Telgi fake stamp paper scam.

In 2010, he became vigilance commissioner at the Central Vigilance Commission. He has been actively advocating mobile computing for filing complaints about corruption through Project Vigeye, launched by the Central Vigilance Commission with the objective of empowering citizens to report corruption in their neighborhood.

== Awards ==
Sri Kumar was decorated with the Police Medal for meritorious service on the occasion of Republic Day (1989) and President's Police Medal for distinguished service on the occasion of Independence Day (1995). He was bestowed the distinguished alumnus award of Indian Institute of Technology, Madras in January 2010.

== Other works ==
He has also worked as the Chairman of Task Force on Internal Security, Confederation of Indian Industry, Southern Region. He launched himself as a social entrepreneur by launching a public charitable Trust called Indian Centre for Social Transformation and working as chairman and founder of this trustee. He later resigned from this position to become Vigilance Commissioner.
