= All That's Left Behind =

Poetry collection by Aditya Tiwari

All That's Left Behind is a poetry collection by Aditya Tiwari published in India by Simon & Schuster in 2026.
