= Rose Varghese =

Indian academic

Rose Varghese is an educator and was the Vice-Chancellor of National University of Advanced Legal Studies, Kochi, Kerala.

== Education ==
Varghese graduated in law from Kerala Law Academy Law College, Thiruvananthapuram. She completed her post graduation in law from the School of Legal Studies, Cochin University of Science and Technology, M.Phil. in law from National Law School of India University, Bangalore and Ph.D. Faculty of Law, from University of Delhi.

== Career ==
- 1976, practice as an attorney at the High Court of Kerala.
- 1985 Lecturer in Law, A.C. College of Law, Nagarjuna University.
- 1988 Assistant Professor, National Law School of India University, Bangalore
- 1994 Associate Professor, Faculty of Law, Jamia Millia Islamia Central University, New Delhi, subsequently Professor and then Dean of the Faculty
