= Subramanya Nagarajarao =

Indian writer

Subramanya Nagarajarao (Kannada: ಸುಬ್ರಮಣ್ಯ ನಾಗರಾಜ ರಾವ್), also known as N. Subramanya, is an Indian author, researcher specialised on refugees and translator. He is currently Director of the Indian Research Institute, Mysore.

== Biography ==
Subramanya Nagarajarao defended his thesis on Tibetan refugees and as awarded his Ph.D. in 1999 by the University of Mysore. He is post graduate in Political Science. He held tenure as Researcher under the UNHCR Chair at the National Law School of India University, Bangalore, during which he worked extensively on the refugee issue. He has guided many master's degree Students in preparation of their dissertations. He worked as Director of Indian Research Institute, Mysore and left it to join a teaching position at University of Mysore. He is also known as a translator from Kannada to English, a passion from his university days. He participated to translating the Sahitya Akademi Awarded book Government Brahmana of Prof. Aravind Malagathi. He is an Hon. Professor with the Indian Institute of Human Rights, New Delhi. In 2008, he published an article with Jan Magnusson and Geoff Childs in Journal of the International Association of Tibetan Studies. After teaching at University of Mysore, he has again taken charge as the Director of a not-for profit academic trust namely Indian Research Institute.

== Publications ==
=== Books ===
- Refugees: Right to freedom of expression and communication - a legal handbook, WACC, 2004, ISBN 81-7214-794-5
- Human rights and refugees, APH Publishing, 2004, ISBN 81-7648-683-3

=== Translations ===
- V. C. Keshava, Exploring Mysore: a complete data map in a special style, V.S.R. Prakashana, 2004 www.vsrprakashana.in
- Aravind Malagatti, Government Brahmana, Orient Longman,(as a member of translation team) 2007 ISBN 81-250-3216-9, ISBN 978-81-250-3216-8

=== Articles ===
- The politics of a refugee problem: a study of Tibetan refugee settlements in Mysore District, India, Tenth Seminar of the International Association for Tibetan Studies (IATS), University of Oxford, England, 6 to 12 September 2003
- Jan Magnusson, Subramanya Nagarajarao and Geoff Childs, South Indian Tibetans: Development Dynamics in the Early Stages of the Tibetan Refugee Settlement Lugs zung bsam grub gling, Bylakuppe, Journal of the International Association of Tibetan Studies Issue 4, December 2008
