= Rajiv Gandhi National Cyber Law Center =

Indian legal institution

Rajiv Gandhi National Cyber Law Centre
- RGNCLC
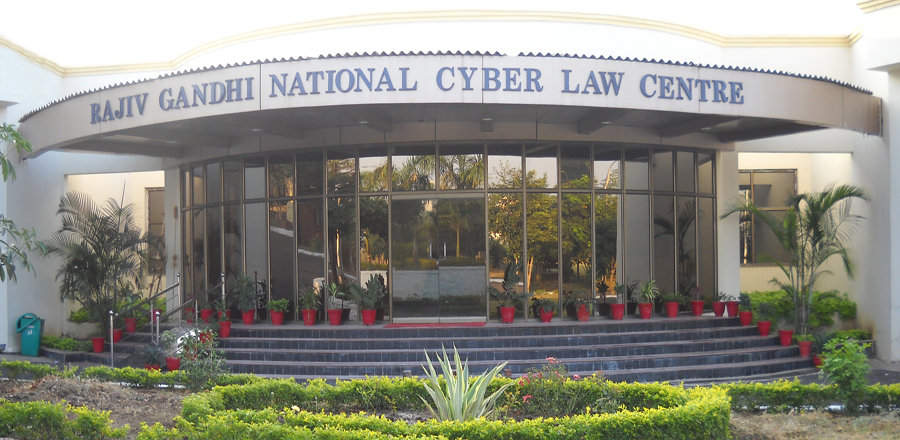
- Type: Public, Educational
- Active: 2009–present
- Academic affiliations: NLIU
- Department Head: Atul Kumar Pandey
- Students: 120
- Location: Bhopal, Madhya Pradesh, India; 23.1832°N 77.3661°E
- Campus: Urban
- Nickname: RGNCLC
- Website: www.nliu.ac.in/rgnclc

Rajiv Gandhi National Cyber Law Centre, Bhopal was established in 2006 by the Ministry of Human Resource Development, Government of India, New Delhi. The institution is first to deal with new and critical issues relating to various techno-legal aspects of cyberspace through regular as well as distance learning mode. The institution is a constituent institution to The National Law Institute University, Bhopal. It offers post-graduate courses in the field of Cyber Law, viz. Post Graduate Diploma in Cyber Law and Master of Science in Cyber Law and Information Security.

== Infrastructure ==
The institution is on the NLIU campus in the outskirt city of Bhopal.

=== Gyan Mandir Library ===
The Gyan Mandir Library was inaugurated by the Honorable Minister of HRD, Arjun Singh on September 19, 2005.
