= Sudhir Krishnaswamy =

Indian academic, administrator and activist (born 1975)

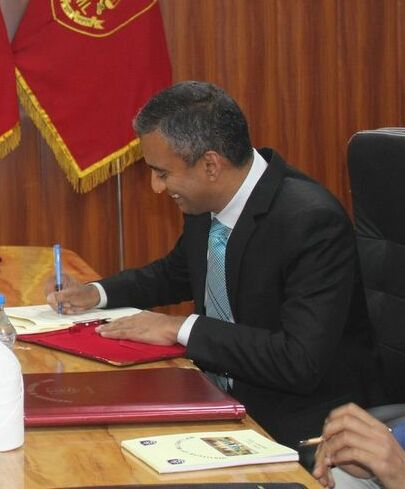
- Krishnaswamy in 2023
- Born: June 3, 1975 (age 50); Bangalore
- Education: National Law School of India University; Pembroke College, Oxford
- Spouse: Jayna Kothari
- Awards: Infosys Prize

Sudhir Krishnaswamy (born 1975) is an Indian academic, administrator, and civil society activist who is currently the Vice-Chancellor of the National Law School of India University (NLSIU) and is a co-founder of the not-for-profit research trust Centre for Law and Policy Research (CLPR). Krishnaswamy took over as VC of NLSIU from R. Venkata Rao in September 2019. Krishnaswamy is the first alumnus of NLSIU to be appointed as the VC of the institution. On 6 May 2020, Facebook appointed him to its content oversight board. He was awarded the Infosys Prize 2022 in the Humanities category, for his insightful understanding of the Indian Constitution.

== Background and Education ==
Krishnaswamy was born on 3 June 1975 in Bangalore, India. Being an alumnus of St. Joseph's Boys' High School, he also graduated from the National Law School of India University (NLSIU), Bangalore with a B.A. LL.B. Subsequently, he read for the BCL at Pembroke College, Oxford as a Rhodes Scholar. He further obtained a D.Phil. from the same institution in 2008. Krishnaswamy has been a Teaching Fellow in Law at the Pembroke College at the University of Oxford, an assistant professor at NLSIU and a professor at the West Bengal National University of Juridical Sciences. He was head of School of Public Policy and Governance at Azim Premji University Bengaluru.

Krishnaswamy has also worked in the Prime Minister's Committee on Infrastructure and the Kasturirangan Committee on Governance of Bangalore. He has authored a book titled ‘Democracy and Constitutionalism in India’ which was published by the Oxford University Press in 2009.

== Bibliography ==
=== Books ===
- Democracy and Constitutionalism in India: A Study of the Basic Structure Doctrine (Oxford University Press 2008)

=== Articles ===
- Access to Knowledge and Traditional Knowledge Protection in R Subramaniam and L Shaver (eds) Access to Knowledge in India (Bloomsbury Academic 2011)
- Sudhir Krishnaswamy and Madhav Khosla Understanding our Supreme Court 46 Economic and Political Weekly 71 (2011)
- Sudhir Krishnaswamy and Madhav Khosla Military Power and the Constitution 611 Seminar (2010)
- Constitutional Durability 615 Seminar (2010)
- Mashelkar Report on IP Rights Version II: Wrong Again 44 Economic and Political Weekly 27 (2009)
- Sudhir Krishnaswamy and Madhav Khosla Regional Emergencies under Article 356: The Extent of Judicial Review 3 Indian Journal of Constitutional Law 168 (2009)
- Sudhir Krishnaswamy and Madhav Khosla Reading AK Thakur v Union of India: Legal Effect and Significance 43 Economic and Political Weekly 53 (2008)
- Where Public Law and Private Law Meet: Horizontal Rights in the Indian Constitution in C Raj Kumar (eds) Human Rights, Criminal Justice and Constitutional Empowerment(Oxford University Press, Delhi 2007)
- Reliance Airports Case: Public Law and Public Sector Reform 41 Economic and Political Weekly 4239 (2006)
- Intellectual Property and India’s Development Policy 1 Indian Journal of Law and Technology (2006)
- Are our IP laws promoting or suppressing Indian Intellectual Property? India IP Essay Contest Winner (2004)
