= G. C. Bharuka =

Indian judge (1941–2018)

'Hon'ble Justice Dr. G.C.Bharuka

Chairman, E-Committee
- In office 2 January 2005 – 30 January 2008
- Appointed by: Manmohan Singh; Prime Minister of India

Acting Chief Justice, Karnataka High Court
- In office 1 June 1994 – 28 April 2003

Judge, Patna High Court
- In office 27 July August 1990 – 30 May 1994

Personal details
- Born: 15 June 1941 Bogra, Bangladesh
- Died: 15 March 2018 (aged 76) New Delhi, India
- Spouse: Dr. Hansa Bharuka
- Children: Rajni Tekriwal, Rashmi Agarwal, Devashish Bharuka, Subhashish Bharuka
- Education: PhD, BSc, MSc, B.Law
- Alma mater: National Law School of India University, Bangalore
- Occupation: Sr. Advocate, Supreme Court of India
- Profession: Arbitrator

Gopi Chand Bharuka (also known as G. C. Bharuka) (1941–2018) was the former chairman of the E-Committee constituted by the Government of India for a period of 3 years from January 2005 to January 2008. He retired as the acting Chief Justice of the High Court of Karnataka.

== Early life and education ==
G.C. Bharuka was born on 15 June 1941 in Bogra, in Bangladesh (then, part of pre-independent India) in a Marwari Agrawal family. After completing his education from Ranchi, he moved to Patna, Bihar to pursue law. In 2003, he completed doctoral studies from the National Law School of India University while still active on the bench at Karnataka High Court. His thesis was later published in a book form titled 'Rejuvenating Judicial System through E-Governance & Attitudinal Change', by Wadhwa & Co.

== Career ==
Bharuka started his legal practice at the Patna High Court in 1968. In 1984 he became a senior lawyer following which in 1990 he was elevated to the bench in Patna High Court. In 1994, he was transferred to the High Court of Karnataka where he served as a judge until his retirement in June 2003 as the acting Chief Justice.

He played an instrumental role is implementing information technology practices in the Indian judicial system with introduction of computers for the first time at Patna High Court. After being transferred to the High Court of Karnataka in 1994, he automated the courts there, starting from subordinate to the high court.

In 2004, keeping the automation of Karnataka courts as a role model, Bharuka was recommended by the Chief Justice of India to the Union Cabinet to set up an e-committee for automation of all courts across India. Bharuka was appointed as the chairman of the e-committee in 2005. Justice Bharuka was appointed as the chairman to formulate the National Policy and Action Plan for Information and Communication Technology Enablement of the Indian Judiciary and suggest measures for management related changes.

He was also chairman of the National Anti-Doping Tribunal, New Delhi, and a regular visiting faculty in the National Judicial Academy, Bhopal and Chanakya National Law University, Patna.

His work on judicial reforms was internationally recognized. He was engaged by the Asian Development Bank as an external consultant for its India Administration of Justice – Technical Assistance Report (2003–04). He was also engaged by Deloitte India as an external consultant for improvement of the judicial system in Kenya through e-governance (2008–09). He was engaged by PricewaterhouseCoopers as project leader in a United Nations Development Programme project for process mapping of the criminal justice system in Bangladesh and suggesting ways for implementation of ICT. In 2013–14, the World Bank engaged him in their project for studying Land Governance in India and preparing a national document. Justice Bharuka was involved in a module concerning dispute resolution.

He was awarded the Skotch Challengers Award for ICT in Judiciary in March 2006.

== Publications ==
Amongst his writings, Bharuka was the editor of 2007 edition of Mulla's Indian Partnership Act, editor of the 2007 edition of Mulla's Sales of Goods Act and Editor of the 10th ed. of Mulla's Transfer of Property Act, 2006. He contributed a chapter on "Corruption in the Justice Delivery System" in the book "Fighting Corruption – The Way Forward" (2013). He also contributed a chapter on "Access to Justice" in the book "Judicial Reforms in India". He was a regular visiting faculty in the National Judicial Academy, Bhopal and Chanakya National Law University, Patna.

Other articles - Implementation of Information And Communication Technology in Indian Judiciary

== Death ==
Bharuka died due to a stroke in New Delhi on 15 March 2018 at the All India Institute of Medical Sciences, New Delhi.
