= Centre of Behavioural and Cognitive Sciences =

Research center in Uttar Pradesh, India

Center of Behavioural and Cognitive Sciences
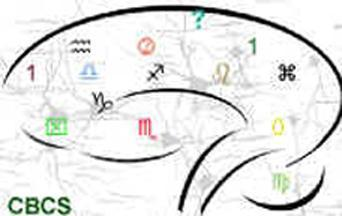
- Type: Public research institute
- Established: 2002
- Head: Dr. Bhoomika Rastogi Kar
- Location: Allahabad, India
- Campus: Urban
- Website: www.cbcs.ac.in

Centre of Behavioural and Cognitive Sciences (also known as CBCS) is an independent research center dedicated to the study of cognitive science and neuroscience. It is affiliated to the University of Allahabad, Uttar Pradesh.

== History ==
CBCS was formally inaugurated on 2 February 2003 by the then Minister of Human Resource Development, Government of India.

CBCS was granted 'Centre with Potential for Excellence' status by the University Grants Commission for three consecutive cycle since 2002.

== Laboratories and other facilities ==
An interdisciplinary research centre, CBCS has several labs to dedicated to the study of brain and mind. It has multiple seminar halls and its own library. It has a computer lab with high end computers equipped to run behavioral experiments.

The centre has electroencephalograph (EEG), transcranial magnetic stimulation (TMS) and a Functional magnetic resonance imaging (fMRI) machine to study the neurophysiological aspect of the human mind. The centre also has eye trackers to study the cognitive processes like perception, attention, memory and language. The centre is broadly divided by the following lab and research groups:

- Cognitive Neuroscience Lab
- Neuroinformatic & Intelligent Computing Lab
- Visual Cognition Lab
- Psycholinguistics Lab
- Biofeedback Lab
- Virtual Reality Lab
- Neuropsychology Lab
- Neuroimaging and fMRI Lab

== Academics and Admission ==
The center offers a Master of Science (M.Sc.) degree, an integrated M.Sc.-PhD program with different exit options and PhD training in Cognitive Sciences. These programs aim to develop a solid foundation in cognitive science with an emphasis on interdisciplinary learning environment.

Admissions to the programs are primarily made through the Cognitive Science Joint Entrance Test (COGJET), organized along with International Institute of Information Technology, Hyderabad, followed by an interview. Interview invites are also given to candidates with a valid Graduate Aptitude Test in Engineering score in various relevant engineering and sciences subjects.
