= Alangar Jayagovind =

Indian lawyer

Alangar Jayagovind (Known as Dr. A. Jayagovind) is a jurist, former vice-chancellor, director, professor of international trade law at National Law School of India University (NLSIU), Bangalore, India., and visiting professor at National Law University, Delhi.

== History ==
He was born on 10 October 1946 in Vitla village of Dakshina Kannada, Karnataka State of India.

He got his B.Sc. degree from Mysore University in 1966 and LL.B from Karnataka University, Dharwad in 1968. He passed Master of Law from University of Madras in 1970 and got Ph.D. from Jawaharlal Nehru University, New Delhi in 1976.

He joined the NLSIU in May 1988 as assistant professor of law (senior) and subsequently was appointed as associate professor in April 1992 and aS Professor Of Law in April 1997. He was director from 1 August 2003 (re-designated as vice-chancellor from 2004) till May 2009. He has also administered the Ministry of Commerce Chair on W.T.O. at NLSIU.

He was a UNESCO Fellow on International Economic Law, George Town Law Centre, Washington D.C., during 1971 and 1972.

He was research associate at the Indian Law Institute between 1974 and 1976 and research officer, Indian Institute of International Law, during 1976–1977, assistant professor at the School of International Studies, Jawaharlal Nehru University, New Delhi, during 1977–1978. He was a senior lecturer in law and head, Department of Public Law and Jurisprudence, University of Sokoto, Nigeria, between 1980 and 1987 before joining the law school.

His areas of specialization include public international law, private international law, international organizations, international trade law and contracts. He has 26 publications to his credit.

Presently he serves as a visiting faculty at National Law University, Delhi, research guide at Symbiosis International University, Pune, visiting professor at NLSIU, visiting professor at Chanakya National Law University, Patna, and as board member in various universities.

== Family ==
He is married to Dr. Sharada Jayagovind, who was the former HOD and professor of English, Govt. College, Vijayanagar, Bangalore.
