= Jayshree Misra Tripathi =

Indian poet (born 1956)

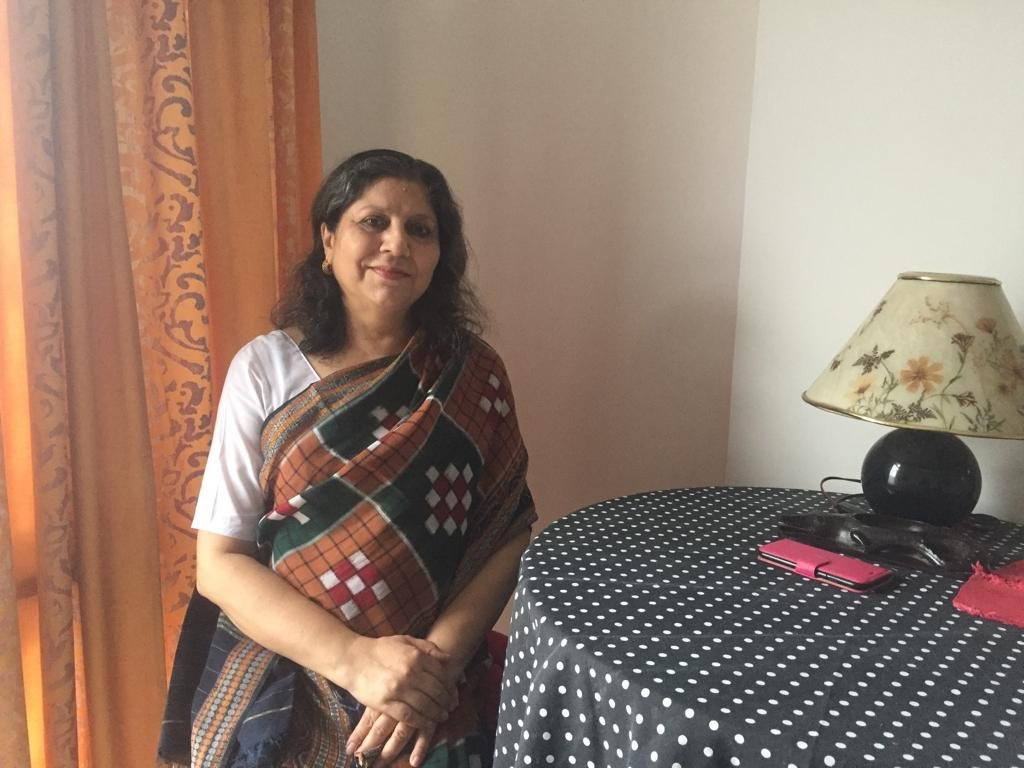
- Tripathi in 2022
- Born: 1956 (age 69–70); Odisha, India
- Other names: Jayshree Tripathi
- Education: Delhi University (Master of arts); National Law School of India University (Postgraduate Diploma in Human Rights Law)
- Occupations: Writer, educator and poet
- Years active: 1983 – 2015
- Known for: Women’s empowerment
- Notable work: The Other Side of Diplomacy

Jayshree Misra Tripathi (born 1956) is an Indian poet, short story writer, and educator known for her works exploring cross-cultural experiences, women’s voices, and human resilience. She writes in English, drawing from her global experiences as a former diplomatic spouse.

== Early life and education ==
Born in Odisha, India, Tripathi completed her M.A. in English from Delhi University in 1978. She later earned a Postgraduate Diploma in Human Rights Law from the National Law School of India University in 2001. Her early career included brief stints in print media during the 1980s.

== Career ==
Tripathi’s writing centres on the silenced voices of women and cross-cultural narratives, influenced by her nomadic life.

She has been an educator for many years.

During the COVID-19 pandemic her poems examined the uncertainties of the era.

Tripathi has contributed to Huffington Post India, News18 India, and Odisha Bytes, with her works reviewed in the Sahitya Akademi’s Journal of Indian Literature.

== Personal life ==
Tripathi incorporates her maiden surname, Misra, in her writing as the eldest of five daughters.

Tripathi has lived in diverse cultures for over thirty years. Her late husband was a career diplomat in the Indian Foreign Service. She resides in Delhi following his retirement.

== Selected works ==
- Tripathi, Jayshree Misra (2002). "My Distant Aunt... and I". Violence Against Women. 8 (3): 399–402. doi:10.1177/10778010222183116. ISSN 1077-8012.
- Tripathi, Jayshree Misra (2014). Dilemmas & scattered weaves : musings in narrative verse & flash vignettes of travels through the diaspora. New Delhi, India: Quills Ink Publishing. ISBN 978-93-84318-38-3. OCLC 930864506.
- TRIPATHI, Jayshree MISRA (20 December 2018). What Not Words Short Stories: Short Stories Set in India and the Diaspora. Authors Press. ISBN 978-1-7919-2532-1.
- Tripathi, Jayshree Misra (2018). Trips And Trials: A Selection of Poems and Songs. PepperScript. ISBN 9789384411534.
- Tripathi, Jayshree Misra, ed. (2025). The Other Side of Diplomacy. Chennai: Westland Non-Fiction, an imprint of Westland Books, a division of Nasadiya Technologies Private Limited. ISBN 978-93-6045-989-5. OCLC 1506115546.
