= Krishna Udayasankar =

Singapore-based Indian author

Dr. Krishna Udayasankar
- Born: Bangalore, India
- Citizenship: Singapore
- Education: National Law School of India University (NLSIU), Bangalore
- Occupations: Author, academic
- Writing career
- Language: English
- Years active: 2012-present
- Genres: Mythopoeia, Historical fiction, Poetry
- Notable works: Govinda, Kurukshetra, 3
- Website: Krishna Udayasankar

Krishna Udayasankar is an Indian author of fiction and an academic. She writes mytho-historical fiction and poetry.

== Personal life and education ==
A graduate of the National Law School of India University (NLSIU), Bangalore, Krishna holds a PhD in Strategic Management from the Nanyang Business School, Singapore and has published two textbooks: International Business: An Asian Perspective (2015) and Global Business Today (2014). Her book Beast (2019), an urban fantasy thriller is published by Penguin Random House, which has also taken over the rights for her backlist of five novels. In a session at the Bangalore Literary Festival in 2018, Udayasankar spoke of how she started writing fiction entirely by accident, and that her first work, The Aryavarta Chronicles, started out as a satirical poem.

== Academic career ==
Udayasankar has held academic appointments at major Singaporean universities, including Nanyang Business School (2009–2016) and the National University of Singapore (2005–2009). Her research examines corporate governance, the business–government–society nexus, and corporate social responsibility.

She is co-author of the Asian editions of International Business and Global Business Today (McGraw-Hill Asia), and her articles have appeared in journals such as the Journal of Business Ethics and Corporate Governance: An International Review. Her research and conference papers have won multiple awards from the Academy of Management and other scholarly bodies. Her single-author paper, Corporate Social Responsibility and Firm Size, published in the Journal of Business Ethics in 2008 has over 1000 citations to date.

== Writing career ==
Udayasankar's fiction re-imagines mythology through a contemporary lens, and is the author of the Aryavarta Chronicles trilogy, consisting of Govinda (2012), Kaurava (2014), and Kurukshetra (2015).

Her standalone works include Immortal (2016), a time-spanning thriller; Beast (2019), an urban fantasy; 3 (2015), based on the founding legend of Singapore; The Cowherd Prince (2020), a prequel to Govinda; and Objects of Affection (2013), a collection of prose-poems. Her writing has been praised for blending philosophical depth with narrative pace, and for exploring the human dimensions of epic and legend.

== Books ==
- Govinda (novel) (Hachette India, 2012)
- Objects of Affection (poetry anthology) (Math Paper Press, 2013)
- Body Boundaries: The Etiquette Anthology of Women's Writing (non-fiction) (The Literary Centre,2013)
- Kaurava (novel) (Hachette India, 2013)
- Kurukshetra (novel) (Hachette India, 2014)
- 3 (novel) (Hachette, 2015)
- Immortal (Hachette India, 2016)
- Beast (Penguin India, 2019)
- The Cowherd Prince: The Prequel to Govinda (Penguin India, 2020)
- Buddha (Penguin India, TBA)
