= Arundhati Katju =

Lawyer and advocate at the Supreme Court of India

- Born: 19 August 1982 (age 44)
- Education: Columbia Law School; National Law School of India University
- Occupation: Advocate at the Supreme Court of India
- Partner: Menaka Guruswamy (2018–present)
- Relatives: Kailash Nath Katju (great grandfather)

Arundhati Katju (born August 19, 1982) is a lawyer qualified to practice in India and New York. She has litigated many notable cases at the Supreme Court of India and the Delhi High Court, including the Section 377 case, the case of a trans man being illegally confined by his parents, the Augusta Westland bribery case, the 2G spectrum corruption case and the Jessica Lal murder case. Her law practice encompasses white-collar defence, general civil litigation, and public interest cases.

Katju obtained a B.A.LL.B. (Hons.) degree from the National Law School of India University, Bangalore (2005). After practising at the Indian bar for 11 years, she enrolled in the LL.M. program (2017) at Columbia University, New York, where she was a Human Rights Fellow, James Kent Scholar, and Public Interest Honoree.

In the year 2019, in an interview with CNN Fareed Zakaria, Katju revealed that she was in a relationship with lawyer Menaka Guruswamy, with whom she convinced the Supreme Court in 2018 to decriminalise Section 377.

== Career ==
In 2016, Katju drafted the lead petition in Navtej Singh Johar and Others v. Union of India, the case that led the Indian Supreme Court to read down Section 377, the Indian sodomy law. She has also litigated other significant LGBTQ rights cases in India, including Suresh Kumar Koushal v Naz Foundation (where the Indian Supreme Court upheld the sodomy law, 2013) and Shivani Bhat v GNCT of Delhi (2015).

=== Decriminalization of homosexuality ===
Katju represented the lead petitioners in Navtej Singh Johar v. Union of India (2018) pertaining to the decriminalization of homosexuality in India. In a landmark judgment, the 5-judge Constitutional bench of the Supreme Court read down Section 377 of the Indian Penal Code, 1860 as not applicable to consenting adults.

=== Illegal confinement case ===
In Shivani Bhat v. National Capital Territory of Delhi & Others, Katju represented Shivani Bhat, a 19-year-old trans man who was deceitfully brought from the United States to India by his parents. Katju filed a Writ Petition in the Delhi High Court on behalf of Bhat for protection from harassment and his right to return to the United States. The Delhi High Court ruled in favour of Shivani and ordered, inter alia, that Shivani's parents must return his travel documents so he could travel back to the US. The Court reaffirmed his right to self-determination, travel and education.

=== August Westland VVIP Chopper Scam ===
In the Augusta Westland corruption case, where middlemen and Indian officials were alleged to have received kickbacks in a deal to purchase helicopters, Katju represented former Air Chief Marshal S.P. Tyagi. Tyagi was granted bail after his arrest by the Central Bureau of Investigation.

== Honours ==
In 2016, Katju was awarded the Human Rights Fellowship by Columbia University, New York and the Women's International Leadership Program Fellowship at International House, New York. She was also awarded Columbia Law School's Herman N. Finkelstein Memorial Fellowship (2018–19). In 2018, she was a US-Italy Young Leaders Fellow. Katju was a TEDx Speaker at TEDxFerhadija’19 where she spoke about how ‘Stories can change the law’. In April 2019, she was included on the Time 100, Time's list of the 100 most influential people in the world, alongside Menaka Guruswamy.

In June 2019, to mark the 50th anniversary of the Stonewall riots, an event widely considered a watershed moment in the modern LGBTQ rights movement, Queerty named her one of the Pride50 "trailblazing individuals who actively ensure society remains moving towards equality, acceptance and dignity for all queer people".

== Publications ==
Year	Title of Editorial	Newspaper/Publisher
2019	Guilty Till Proved Innocent	Indian Express
2018	The gap in disaster management funding	Mint
2018	Opinion: 377 verdict is a new dawn not just for LGBTQ rights but for individual liberties in India	Scroll.in
2018	Rights Over Wrong	Indian Express
2018	LGBTQ rights in India: The Doctrine of Constitutional Morality and Counter-Majoritarianism in the Context of Institutional Supremacy	ConstitutionNet
2018	As US courts turn purist, SC is liberal mascot	The Times Of India
2018	Triple Talaq: Personal Law and Colonial Shadows in Contemporary India	ConstitutionNet
2017	Reading Inwards from the Margins: Indic Classical Thought in Nietzsche and Foucault	Nietzsche
2017	Meditations on Breath and Sexual Difference	Nietzsche
2013	Let's call it hate speech	The Indian Express
