= Parmesh Shahani =

Indian author

- Born: Mumbai, India
- Education: Bombay University (1996)
- Alma mater: University of Mumbai; Massachusetts Institute of Technology
- Notable works: Queeristan

Parmesh Shahani is an Indian author and the head of Godrej DEI Lab. He formerly lead the Godrej India Cultural Lab.

== Early life and education ==
Shahani was born and raised on Mumbai, India.

He earned a bachelor's degree in finance from Bombay University in 1996, then received two post-baccalaureate diplomas, one in film and television from the Xavier Institute of Communication and one in education in 2003. In 2005, he received a master's degree in media studies from the Massachusetts Institute of Technology (MIT).

While studying at MIT in Boston, Shahani was able to be "openly gay for the first time in his life," which inspired his master's thesis and other works.

== Career ==
After receiving a bachelor's degree in 1996, Shahani held various jobs, including as a news reporter for the Bombay Times and founding "FreshLimeSoda.com, India’s first online youth magazine."

Following the completion of his master's thesis, which explored homosexuality in Mumbai, Shahani returned to India, where homosexuality was decriminalized in 2018, and "advocated for corporate diversity policies that specifically prohibit discrimination based on sexual orientation".

== Award and honors ==
- Yale World Fellow
- Young Global Leader by World Economic Forum

== Publications ==
- Gay Bombay: Globalization, Love and (Be)longing in Contemporary India. SAGE Publishing. 2008. ISBN 9780761936480.
- Queeristan: LGBTQ Inclusion in the Indian Workplace. Westland Books. 2020. ISBN 9789389648140.
