= Queeristan =

2020 book written by Parmesh Shahani

- Cover
- Author: Parmesh Shahani
- Language: English
- Publisher: Westland Books
- Publication date: 17 August 2020
- Publication place: India
- Pages: 320

Queeristan is a book written by Parmesh Shahani. The book was published in 17 August 2020 by Westland Books.

== Background ==
Parmesh Shahani is an entrepreneur with experience in Indian corporations, and is also a gay man and advocate for LGBTQ people in workplaces. The book covers his personal experiences in the workplace, background on LGBTQ people in India, and arguments and advice for companies to support and include LGBTQ employees.

== Reception ==
Moneycontrol Review write about the book "The author covers various aspects of framing diversity and inclusion policies, finding talent from the LGBTQ community, creating a recruitment process that is LGBTQ friendly, creating an LGBTQ-friendly work culture at the workplace, and how to be an ally, whether you identify as LGBTQ or not."

SheThePeopleTv said "Shahani alludes to these practices of tokenism in the book, about how these gestures are empty if changes are not brought about in institutional policies."
