= Menaka Guruswamy =

Indian lawyer and politician (born 1974)

Member of Parliament, Rajya Sabha
- Incumbent
- Assumed office 3 April 2026
- Preceded by: Mausam Noor
- Constituency: West Bengal

Personal details
- Born: 27 November 1974 (age 51) Hyderabad, Andhra Pradesh (now in Telangana), India
- Party: Trinamool Congress (2026) (until 2026); Mamata All India Trinamool Congress (from 2026)
- Domestic partner: Arundhati Katju (2018–present)
- Education: University of Oxford; Harvard Law School; National Law School
- Occupation: Senior Advocate at the Supreme Court of India

Menaka Guruswamy (born 27 November 1974) is an Indian lawyer and politician. Since 2026, she has served as a member of Parliament in the Rajya Sabha, representing West Bengal. Guruswamy is also a senior advocate at the Supreme Court of India and was the B.R. Ambedkar Research Scholar and lecturer at Columbia Law School, New York, from 2017 to 2019.

Guruswamy has also been visiting faculty at Yale Law School, New York University School of Law and University of Toronto Faculty of Law. She is known for having played a significant role in many landmark cases before the Supreme Court, including the Section 377 case, the bureaucratic reforms case, the Augusta Westland bribery case, the Salwa Judum case, and the Right to Education case. She is assisting the Supreme Court as Amicus Curie in the case pertaining to the alleged extrajudicial killings of 1,528 persons in Manipur by members of the military and the security forces.

Guruswamy has advised the United Nations Development Fund, New York and United Nations Children's Fund (UNICEF), New York and UNICEF South Sudan on various aspects of International Human Rights Law and has also supported the constitution-making process in Nepal. A member of the Trinamool Congress, she is the first openly LGBTQ+ parliamentarian at the national level in India's history.

== Early life and education ==
Guruswamy is the daughter of Meera Guruswamy and Mohan Guruswamy, a former Bharatiya Janata Party strategist and Special Advisor to Union Finance Minister Yashwant Sinha.

Guruswamy has advanced degrees in law from the University of Oxford, Harvard Law School and the National Law School of India University. Her primary education was Hyderabad Public School, after which she finished High School at Sardar Patel Vidyalaya, New Delhi. This was followed by B.A.LL.B. (Hons) from National Law School of India University, Bangalore (1997). Subsequently, she was awarded a Rhodes Scholarship to read for the BCL at the University of Oxford (2000) and the Gammon Fellowship to pursue the LL.M at Harvard Law School (2001). She obtained her D.Phil from the University of Oxford in 2015 with a thesis on 'Constitutionalism in India, Pakistan and Nepal'. She would later become a trustee of Rhodes Trust.

In the year 2019, in an interview with CNN's Fareed Zakaria, Guruswamy revealed that she was in a relationship with lawyer Arundhati Katju, with whom she convinced the Supreme Court in 2018 to decriminalise Section 377, saying that the victory was not just a professional benchmark but also a personal win.

== Legal career ==
Guruswamy joined the bar in 1997 and started working with the then Attorney General of India, Ashok Desai. After completing her BCL at Oxford (2000) and LL.M. at Harvard (2001), she practiced law at Davis Polk & Wardwell, New York, as an Associate.

Her practice at the Supreme Court of India covers areas of White Collar Defense, Constitutional Law, Corporate Law and Arbitration. She has represented the Union of India and National Capital Territory of Delhi in various matters.

=== Decriminalisation of Homosexuality ===
In April 2016, Guruswamy along with a team of lawyers including Arundhati Katju and Saurabh Kripal filed a petition on behalf of five LGBT petitioners led by Navtej Singh Johar challenging the constitutionality of Section 377 of the Indian Penal Code, 1860. The petition was the first instance that LGBT Indians actually filed writ petitions alleging violation of their fundamental rights. Guruswamy also appeared on behalf of petitioners from the Indian Institute of Technology, Delhi and in the landmark judgment, the 5-judge Constitutional bench of the Supreme Court read down Section 377 as not applicable to consenting adults.

She had also appeared for Shyam Benegal the film maker in the Supreme Court in the case of Suresh Kumar Koushal v. Naz Foundation (2013).

=== Bureaucratic Reforms Case ===
In the case of T.S.R. Subramanium & Others v. Union of India, Guruswamy represented former cabinet secretary T.S.R. Subramanian and 80 other retired high ranking bureaucrats to seek the implementation of various bureaucratic reforms. In a significant decision, the Supreme Court held, inter alia, that bureaucrats are not bound to follow oral orders from Government officials and must rely on written orders, that a Civil Services Board consisting of senior bureaucrats must be formed at the Centre and State level to look into matters of postings and transfers.

=== Right to Education Case ===
Guruswamy represented an intervenor, the Azim Premji Foundation, in the case of Society for Unaided Private Schools of Rajasthan v. Union of India pertaining to the constitutionality of Section 12(1)(c) of the Right of Children to Free and Compulsory Education Act, 2009. Section 12(1)(c) mandated private unaided schools to admit 25% of their Class strength with children from weaker and disadvantaged sections and provide them with free education. The Supreme Court ruled in favor of the Constitutionality of the provision.

=== Salwa Judum Case ===
Guruswamy was a part of the team of lawyers that successfully litigated against Salwa Judum in the landmark case of Nandini Sundar v. State of Chhattisgarh [(2011) 7 SCC 547]. Salwa Judam was the practice of deploying tribal youths as Special Police Officers in the fight against the Maoist insurgency and ordered their immediate disarming.

=== August Westland VVIP Chopper Scam ===
In the Augusta Westland corruption case, wherein middlemen and Indian officials received kickbacks in a deal to purchase helicopters, Guruswamy represented former Air Chief Marshal S.P. Tyagi before a Special CBI Court. She successfully argued for his bail after his arrest. In 2018, a charge sheet was filed against Tyagi and the case is currently pending.

=== Amicus Curiae ===
In 2012, a bench of Justice Aftab Alam and Justice Ranjana Desai appointed Guruswamy as the Amicus Curie in the case of alleged 1528 extrajudicial killings by the armed forces in Manipur, India. Among other contributions, Guruswamy proposed to the bench that a Special Investigation Team be set up to investigate the killings of persons. In 2016, accepting the submissions of the Amicus and the Petitioners, the Supreme Court ordered that the use of excessive force by Police or the Armed Forces must be thoroughly enquired into. The Court held that there is no concept of absolute immunity from trial by the criminal court constituted under the Cr.P.C., even if the offence is alleged to have been committed by army personnel. In 2017, the Court directed the CBI to constitute a Special Investigation Team to complete investigations in the matter, lodge FIRs in the matter and file chargesheets wherever necessary. The case is ongoing in the Supreme Court.

=== Senior Advocate ===
On 29 March 2019, Guruswamy was designated Senior Advocate by the Supreme Court of India. The designation is conferred on merit to exceptional lawyers by the Supreme Court of India or of High Courts in the States. The designation is conferred by a permanent committee consisting of the Chief Justice of India as its Chairperson, along with two-senior-most Supreme Court judges, Attorney general for India, and a member of the Bar as nominated by the Chairperson and other members. Each application is then sent to all the justices of the Supreme Court who consider the list of advocates who have applied and review the marks allotted.

== Academic career ==
Guruswamy was the B.R. Ambedkar Research Scholar and Lecturer at Columbia Law School, New York from 2017-2019. She has also been visiting faculty at Yale Law School, University of Toronto Faculty of Law and New York University School of Law. She has taught courses on South Asian Constitutionalism, Comparative Constitutional Law, Constitutional Design in Post-Conflict Democracies and others.

== Political career ==
On 27 February 2026, Guruswamy was announced as the Trinamool Congress party candidate from West Bengal for the 2026 Rajya Sabha elections, held on 16 March. She was elected, becoming the first openly LGBTQ+ person to serve as a member of the Parliament of India.

== Honors and awards ==
Guruswamy is the first Indian and second woman to have her portrait hung at the Milner Hall in Rhodes House at the University of Oxford. In January 2019, her name featured in Foreign Policy's 100 Global Thinkers List, along with other prominent personalities such as Michelle Obama, Kofi Annan and Jeff Bezos. On International Women's Day in March 2019, Guruswamy was honored by Harvard Law School as Women Inspiring Change in a portrait exhibition. In 2019, she was included on the Time 100, Time's list of the 100 most influential people in the world alongside Arundhati Katju. She has also been featured in Forbes India's List of Women-Power Trailblazer, 2019.

== Publications ==
Guruswamy has co-edited Founding Moments in Constitutionalism to be published on October 19, 2019, by Hart/Bloomsbury Publications, UK. Her most recent publications include essays on Constitution-Making in South Asia, in Handbook on Comparative Constitutional Law (Edward Elgar, Forthcoming (2019), short piece on the Aadhar decision in the American Journal of International Law (2018) and 'Crafting Constitutional Values: An Essay on the Supreme Court of India', (An Inquiry into the Existence Of Global Values, Hart Publishing/Bloomsbury (2015).

Guruswamy writes widely for print and online publications such as the New York Times, the Indian Express, Scroll.in and the Hindu.
