= National Law School of India University =

Public Law School in Bangalore, India

- Other names: National Law School, NLS Bengaluru, NLSIU
- Motto: Dharmo Rakshati Rakshitah (trans. Dharma protects those who protect it)
- Type: Law school, state university
- Established: 1986; 40 years ago
- Founder: N. R. Madhava Menon
- Affiliations: UGC, BCI
- Budget: ₹38 crore (US$3.9 million)
- Chancellor: Chief Justice of India (Note: As per section 7 of the Act, "the Chief Justice of India or his nominee who is a sitting Judge of the Supreme Court shall be the visitor of the School.")
- Vice-Chancellor: Dr. Sudhir Krishnaswamy
- Total staff: 109 (16 administration, 93 academic) (Note: Out of the total, 56 are core faculty, 3 are adjunct faculty and 34 are visiting faculty)
- Students: 935
- Location: Bengaluru, India
- Campus: 23 acres (9.3 ha); Urban-located residential-cum-day school
- Language: English
- Founding document: The National Law School of India Act, 1986
- Website: www.nls.ac.in

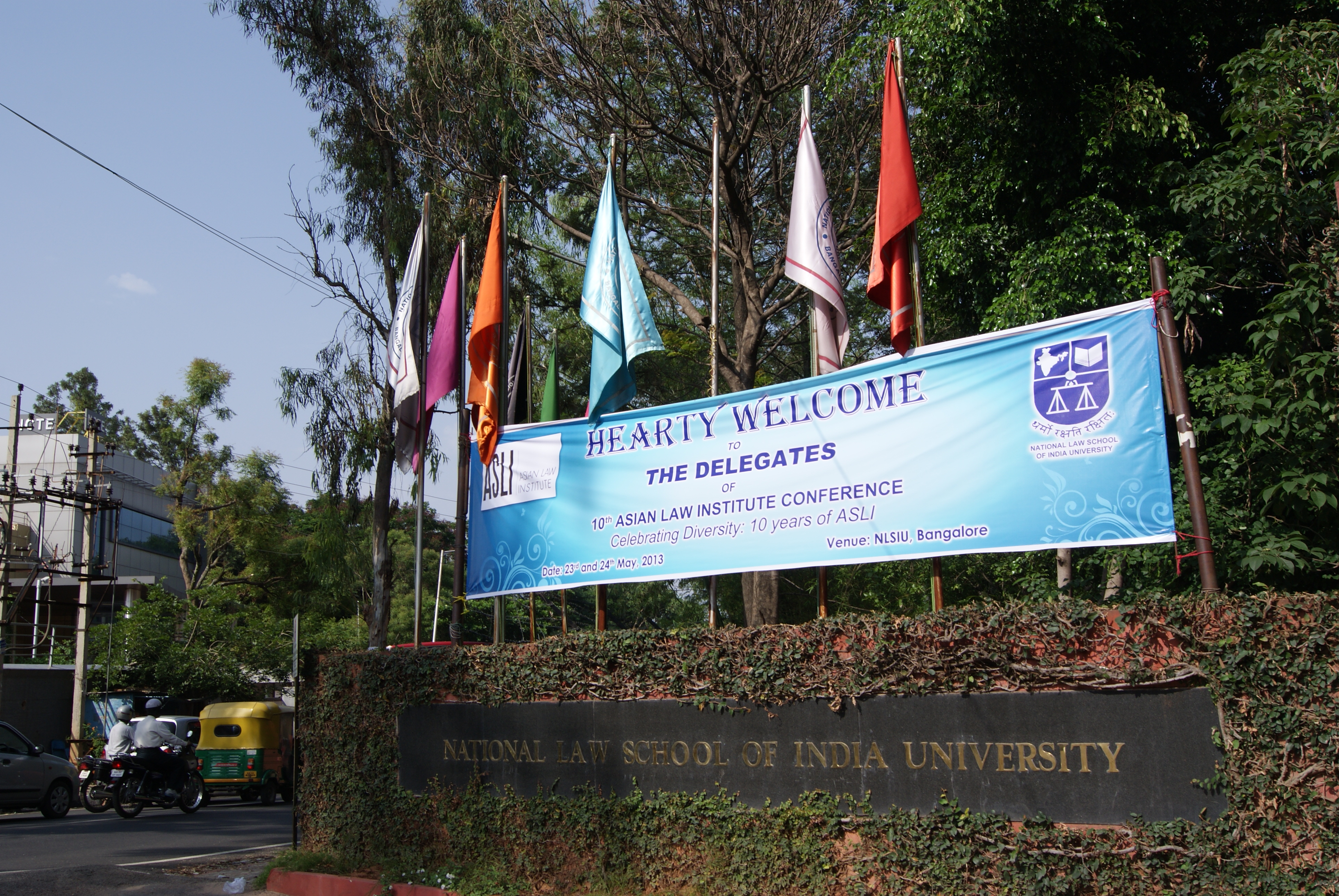
National Law School of India University

The National Law School of India University (NLSIU), commonly referred to as the National Law School (NLS), is a state law university in Bengaluru, Karnataka, India. Established under the Karnataka Act No. 22 of 1986, it is widely regarded as one of the most elite institutions in India for legal education and has consistently been ranked first in the National Institutional Ranking Framework (NIRF) for law.

The University offers a five-year undergraduate Bachelor of Arts–Bachelor of Laws programme (BA LLB) and a one-year LLM programme. Entrance to these programmes is through the Common Law Admission Test (CLAT). Additionally, the University has an undergraduate Bachelor of Arts (Honours) programme, a three-year LLB (Honours) postgraduate programme, a two-year Master’s Programme in Public Policy, and doctoral degrees in law and social sciences, humanities and public policy.

Spread over a 23-acre campus, it houses India's largest legal library and hosts some of the country's well-known competitions and events, including the NLS Debate and Strawberry Fields festival. The NLSIU is the only Indian institute to have won the Philip C. Jessup International Law Moot Court Competition, having done so in 1999 and 2013. Furthermore, 25 alumni have been Rhodes scholars.

== History ==
The National Law School was founded after two decades of work by lawyers including former Chief Justice Mohammad Hidayatullah, Ram Jethmalani and Upendra Baxi, who petitioned the Legal Education Committee of the Bar Council of India to establish a university to rival Harvard Law School. Subsequently, the Bar Council of India Trust and Government of Karnataka reached an agreement to found the first National Law University in Bangalore. In 1986, the National Law University of India was established under the leadership of its founder, then Vice-Chancellor N. R. Madhava Menon.

Due to its excellence in the field of law, NLSIU is often referred to as the "Harvard of the East".

Menon ensured that the teaching at the university was based on the case method at Harvard rather than the traditional lecture format that was then rampant across Indian law schools. He also introduced to the university the concept of collaborative teaching, wherein more than one professor would conduct classes, with different professors taking and arguing contradictory positions in jurisprudence.

The first batch of undergraduate law students were enrolled in 1 July 1988. Classes commenced before the school's buildings had been fully constructed, with lessons delivered at the Central College of Bangalore University until November 1991. Thereafter, the school moved to its current location in the Nagarbhavi suburb.

In 1995, the first UNHCR Chair for Refugee Law was inaugurated at NLSIU, which serves as the Asian Centre for Refugee Law. Professor N. Subramanya worked on key issues pertaining to refugees during his tenure.

== Administration ==
The Chief Justice of India is the Visitor and de facto Chancellor of the school, with the ability to adjudicate and advise the operations of the school. The Vice-Chancellor of the school is the chief executive of the university and manages the day-to-day operations of the school. The school has had five more Vice-Chancellors since Menon, namely N. L. Mitra, A. Jayagovind, G. Mohan Gopal, R. Venkata Rao, and Sudhir Krishnaswamy, who took over in 2019.

The administration of the school is governed by the General Council, Executive Council, Academic Council, and Finance Council. These Councils comprise key figures from the Government of Karnataka, the Chief Justice of India, the Chairman of the Bar Council of India, Judges of the Supreme Court of India, the Advocate General of Karnataka, as well as Ministers and Secretaries from the Karnataka State Government. Additionally, distinguished legal scholars contribute to the governance of the institution.

== Admissions ==
Admissions to the 5-year undergraduate BA LLB (Hons) programme are based on the Common Law Admission Test-undergraduate (CLAT-UG). For the 2023-24 session of the undergraduate CLAT, a total of 56,472 students competed for 2644 total law seats, out of which 240 were offered at the NLSIU. In 2020, the NLSIU attempted to withdraw from the CLAT, announcing that it would hold its own entrance examination. This decision was soon overturned by the Supreme Court of India.

The postgraduate version of the CLAT screens candidates for the Master of Laws Programme. CLAT is administered by the Consortium of NLUs.

Candidates of the NLS Bachelor of Arts (Hons), three-year LLB (Hons), Master of Public Policy, and Doctor of Philosophy are screened by the National Law School Admission Tests (NLSAT) conducted by NLSIU.

In June 2021, the NLSIU announced a plan to increase the number of students enrolled on campus from 660 in 2021 to 2,200 in 2028, led by increasing the batch sizes of the BA-LLB cohort and the establishing of a three-year LLB course.

The NLSIU has preserved 25% of seats for home students of Karnataka across admissions, but the Government of Karnataka has reservations on the manner in which this policy has been implemented.

== Academics ==
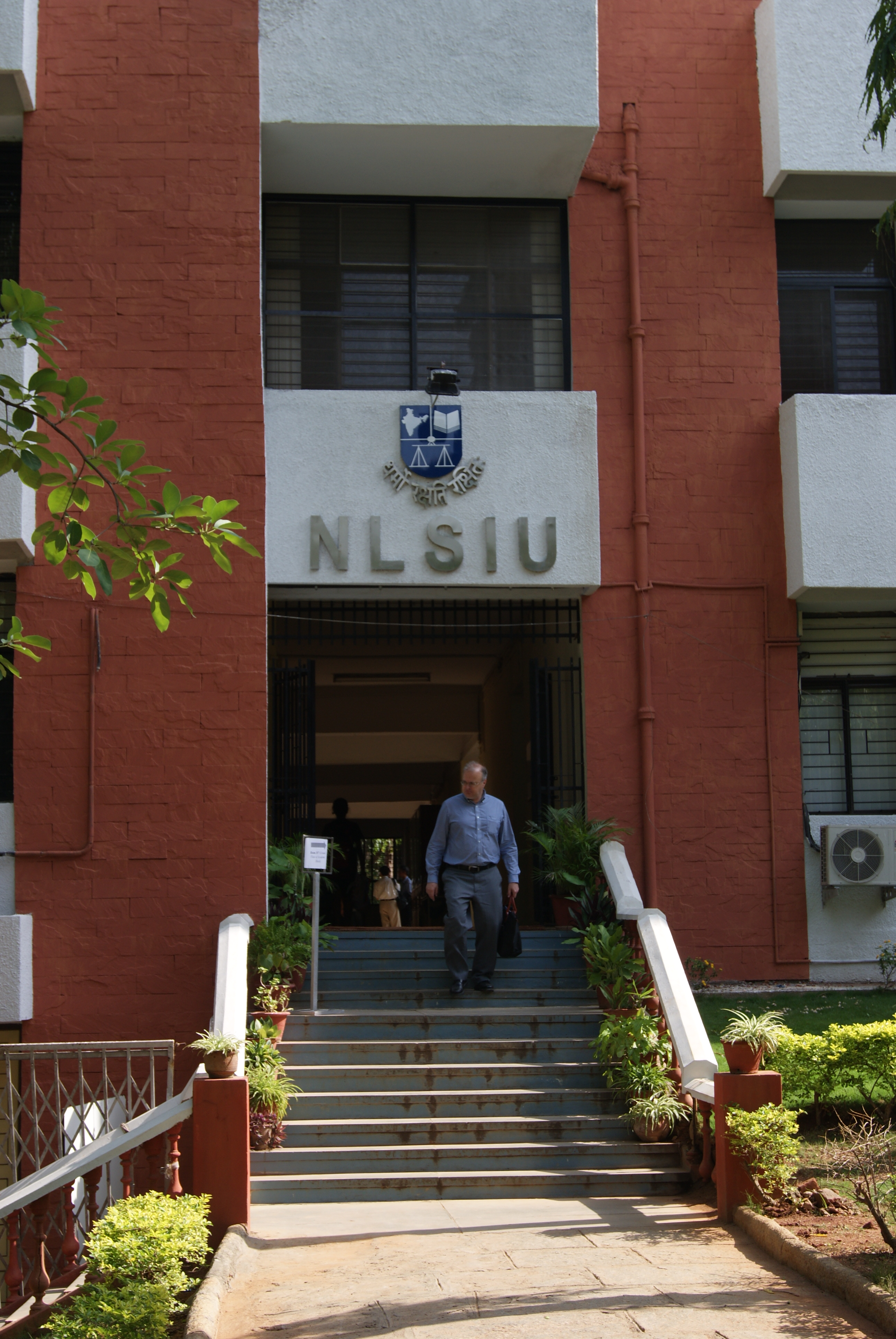
The original Academic Block, now known as the Old Academic Block (OAB)

=== Undergraduate ===
The NLSIU offers graduates a five-year integrated BA/LLB which qualifies the student to sit for the bar in India. The curriculum consists of a blend of social science and law subjects. In the first two years, students attend courses in history, political science, sociology and economics, alongside legal subjects such as tort, contract and constitutional law. In the subsequent three years, students mainly study legal subjects.

In 2017, NLSIU overhauled its academic curriculum to allow students to choose a greater number of their upper-year courses, allowing students to explore areas of interest to a greater degree.

In 2025, the university introduced a three-year BA (Hons) programme with the option of an additional fourth year for research. The NLS BA (Hons.) Programme offers every student the option of electing a major-minor combination, or a double major. The majors and minors will be in the same areas/disciplines that are currently taught within the BA LLB (Hons.) programme. These disciplines are: 1) History, 2) Sociology & Anthropology, 3) Economics, and 4) Politics.

=== Postgraduate ===
NLSIU launched a three-year LLB programme in 2022, making it the first National Law University to do so.

The school offers a one-year LLM by coursework, a two-year MPP, and doctorate programmes in law and social sciences, humanities and public policy.

In addition to the above full-time programmes, the school's Professional And Continuing Education (PACE) department offers several part-time distance learning programmes, including a Masters in Business Law and postgraduate diplomas in various fields.

=== Rankings ===
University rankings

Law – India
- NIRF (2024): 1
- India Today (2022): 1
- Government colleges
- Outlook India (2022): 1

National Law School of India is widely considered the best law school in India. The National Institutional Ranking Framework ranked the institute first in its law ranking of 2023, 2024 and 2025, as did India Today's "India's Best Colleges 2023: Law", and Outlook India's "Top 13 Government Law Institutes" of 2023.

=== Narayan Rao Melgiri Memorial National Law Library ===
The NLSIU's Narayan Rao Melgiri Memorial National Law Library is the largest law library in the country, housing a collection of over 50,000 books and 20,000 journals. It is named after Narayan Rao Melgiri, a lawyer in Gadag. The Melgiri Library was inaugurated by Chief Justice of India Ramesh Chandra Lahoti in 2005, and was funded by contributions from the University Grants Commission (India) and Sudha Murthy, chairperson of the Infosys Foundation and granddaughter of Melgiri.

In 2023, Chief Justice of India Dhananjaya Y. Chandrachud and Bhutan Princess Sonam Dechen Wangchuck inaugurated a renovated library building, which now includes a number of accessibility features, including braille printers, screen readers, and desktop magnifiers.

== Student activities ==
=== Student Bar Association ===
The Student Bar Association (SBA) is the umbrella body that coordinates all student activities. All students are de facto members of the SBA. The SBA oversees twelve activity-based committees (ABCs) that manage specific student activities. Institutional events include the Spiritus sports festival, Strawberry Fields music festival, the NLS-Trilegal International Arbitration Moot, the NLS Negotiation and Mediation Competition, and the Admit One theater festival. Students also run the publication of Quirk, an online magazine at NLSIU.

=== Competitive debating ===
NLSIU plays an active role in promoting parliamentary style debate in India. The school regularly participates in international competitions and is currently the highest-ranking Indian team in the debating world rankings.

NLSIU reached the ESL Finals in 2002 and in 2007 at the World Universities Debating Championship. It also recently won the 15th All Asian Debating Championships held in Dhaka in 2008. NLSIU was the first South Asian team to reach the second round of the Cambridge University Debate Competition. All three NLSIU teams reached the semi-finals in the inaugural Asians BP Tournament held in Chulalongkorn University, with two out of the top ten speakers being from the university. The school has also reached the semi-finals of the United Asian Debating Championships 2010.

Beginning in 2002, the NLSIU has hosted South Asia's largest parliamentary debate competition, the National Law School Debate. In 2011, the NLSIU launched the NLS Union Debate and the NLS Debate Junior. Christ Junior College also organised a debate with NLS in 2011.

=== Moot court competitions ===
The NLSIU is the only law school in South Asia to have won the Philip C. Jessup International Law Moot Court Competition twice, in 1999 and 2013. It also reached the Jessup finals in 2018. The university has also won the Monroe E. Price Media Law Moot Court Competition at the University of Oxford in 2021. NLSIU has also won the Manfred Lachs Space Law Moot Court competition in 2009, 2012 and most recently in 2017.

== Notable people ==
=== Alumni ===
- Yogesh Pratap Singh, Constitutional Law Scholar and Vice-Chancellor, National Law University Tripura.
- Shamnad Basheer, founder, SpicyIP Blog and the IDIA Trust.
- G. C. Bharuka, Acting Chief Justice, Karnataka High Court
- Gautam Bhatia, lawyer
- Ananda Mohan Bhattarai, a Justice of Supreme Court of Nepal
- Harpreet Singh Giani, litigator.
- Menaka Guruswamy and Arundhati Katju, couple known for their involvement in decriminalisation of homosexuality. Jointly named as one of Times 100 Most Influential Persons 2019.
- Padmapriya Janakiraman, Indian Actress
- Shahina K. K., Journalist
- Kalyan Chakravarthy Kankanala, Advisory Board Member of the Centre for Excellence in Intellectual Property and Standards at the National Law School of India University, and an Intellectual Property Attorney and Author.
- Prabha Kotiswaran, Professor of King's College London
- Sudhir Krishnaswamy, Vice-Chancellor of NLSIU
- Aparna Kumar, IPS, UP Cadre, Awarded with the Tenzing Norgay National Adventure Award in 2018
- K. Vijay Kumar IPS, Director General Of Police
- R Sri Kumar, Central Vigilance Commissioner
- Lawrence Liang, Professor of Ambedkar University Delhi
- Hari Prasad Phuyal, a Justice of Supreme Court of Nepal
- Lavanya Rajamani, Indian Lawyer
- Srikrishna Deva Rao, Vice Chancellor of National Law University Delhi
- Jayshree Misra Tripathi, writer, poet and educator
- Krishna Udayasankar, Writer
- Rose Varghese, former Vice Chancellor of National University of Advanced Legal Studies, Kochi

=== Faculty ===
- Albertina Almeida, a lawyer and human rights activist
- T. R. Andhyarujina, Senior advocate at the Supreme Court of India
- S. Rajendra Babu, 34th Chief Justice of India
- Ajay Gudavarthy, a political theorist, analyst and columnist in India
- Shashikala Gurpur, Indian author and professor
- Alangar Jayagovind, Professor of International Trade Law, and also a former Vice Chancellor.
- Altamas Kabir, 39th Chief Justice of India
- Subramanya Nagarajarao, author and researcher specialised in refugees
- Issa G. Shivji, a Tanzanian author and academic
- V. Vijayakumar, Vice Chancellor of National Law Institute University, Bhopal

== Publications ==
There are numerous journals published by the students and faculty at NLSIU. Their National Law School of India Review has been cited by the Supreme Court of India in two notable judgments including the Right to Privacy verdict, which is the only student-run law journal of the already few Indian law journals to have been cited by the Supreme Court of India.

These are the journals published by the school:

- National Law School Journal
- National Law School of India Review
- NLS Business Law Review
- Socio-Legal Review
- Journal on Environmental Law Policy and Development (JELPD)
- Journal of Law and Public Policy (JLPP)
- International Journal on Consumer law and Practice
- Indian Journal of Law and Technology
- Indian Journal of International Economic Law (IJIEL)

== See also ==
- Legal education in India
- Public Policy Schools
- National Law Universities
- National Academy of Legal Studies and Research
- Gujarat National Law University
