= Yogesh Pratap Singh (academic) =

Indian legal scholar (born 1978)

Prof. (Dr.) Yogesh Pratap Singh
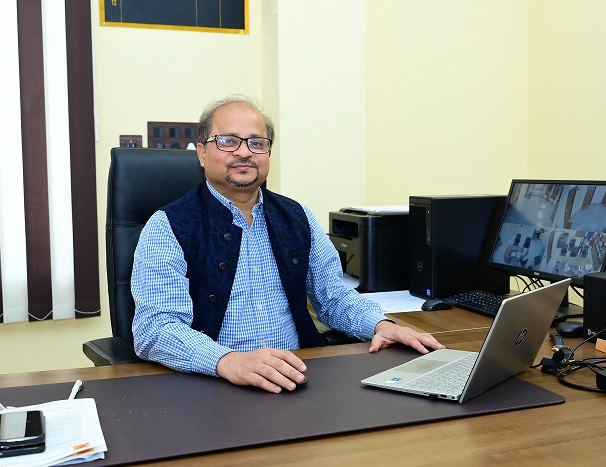
- Born: 8 August 1978 (age 48)
- Citizenship: Indian
- Education: B.A., M.A. & LL.B. (University of Allahabad) LL.M. (NLSIU Bangalore), Ph.D. (NLUO)
- Occupations: Academic; author; educational administrator
- Employer: NLU
- Known for: Constitutional law teacher
- Title: Vice Chancellor, NLU, Tripura

Yogesh Pratap Singh (born 8 August 1978) is an academician, academic administrator, and Indian scholar of constitutional law. He is currently serving as the founding Vice-Chancellor of National Law University Tripura, Agartala (on lien). Previously, he worked as Professor of Law and Registrar at National Law University, Odisha. Singh also served as Vice-Chancellor In-charge of the National Law University, Odisha, from 28 September 2020 to 20 March 2021.

== Education ==
Prof. Singh joined the National Law School of India University (NLSIU) Bengaluru and completed his LL.M. with specialization in Human Rights Law. His doctoral work (Ph.D.) was on the Contribution of Dissenting Opinions of Indian Supreme Court Judges. He also participated in 39th Annual Session of the International Institute of Human Rights, Strasbourg, France, and completed his human rights training. Singh was also part of one-month training programme "Ciedhu" on Human Rights Teaching. Dr. Singh participated in the South Asia Regional Leadership Program (2024) of Johns Hopkins University, US.

== Career ==
Dr. Singh served as Deputy Registrar, Research in the Supreme Court of India (on deputation) from May 2016 to October 2018. Besides teaching and research, Prof. Singh has published numerous papers and books. Prof. Yogesh also explored new areas such as public health law, especially in tobacco control. Dr. Singh's articles appear in newspapers such as The New Indian Express, Deccan Herald, DNA India, Indian Express, The Wire, Hindustan Times, The Statesman, The Tribune, Livelaw, and other legal magazines.

== Contributions ==
He was part of the editorial team of the Supreme Court of India that prepared the report "Subordinates Courts of India: A Report on Access to Justice (2016)", which was referred to by Chief Justice T.S. Thakur, Justice Dr. D. Y. Chandrachud, Justice L. Nageswara Rao in Imtiyaz Ahmad vs. State of U.P. & Ors. decided on 2 January 2017. He has worked on several projects including "Supporting stronger and evidence based tobacco control initiatives through capacity building and strengthening laws, policies and institutional mechanism with multi-stakeholder engagement towards tobacco-free India" granted by The International Union Against Tuberculosis and Lung Disease (The Union), Rue Jean Lantier, 75001, Paris France, and Third Party line compliance monitoring to assess compliance level with enforcement of Sections 4 and 6 of COTPA.' He has organized various events, including the ICSSR-sponsored Ten-day Research Methodology Workshop for M.Phil./Ph.D./PDF Scholars. Singh has participated and presented papers in several National and International Conferences/ Seminar/ Webinars/ Conclaves. He has been a resource person for the National Judicial Academy, Bhopal, Pandit Deendayal Upadhyaya National Academy of Social Security, New Delhi, National Academy of Custom, Excise and Narcotics (NACEN), Faridabad, State Judicial Academies, Police Academy, Prison Academy, etc. Singh delivered Justice V R Krishna Iyer Memorial Public Lecture on "How Concurring Opinion Matter" organized by Ronald Dworkin Study Circle.

== Books ==
- Institutional Decline in Neo-Liberal Regime: A Note From India, published by Thomson Reuters Publications, 2022. ISBN 978-93-92630-23-1
- Judicial Dissent and Indian Supreme Court: Enriching Constitutional Discourse published by Thomson Reuters Publication. ISBN No. 978-93-86374-50-9.
- The Supreme Court and the Constitution along with Mr. Salman Khurshid and Dr. Lokendra Malik and published by Wolter Kluwer Publications, 2020. ISBN 9789389859713
- Tribal Justice: Seventy Years of Working of Indian Constitution published by Eastern Book Company Lucknow.
- Kumar Kartikeya's Article 12 published by Eastern Book Company Lucknow, Uttar Pradesh 2020. ISBN 9789389656749
- Animal and Environmental Jurisprudence: Wildlife Perspective published by Satyam Law International Publishers New Delhi, 2020. ISBN 9789387839618
- Protection of Refugee Women in Present International Legal Regime: A Study published by Lambert Academic Publishing House, Germany. ISBN 978-3-8383-7408-6
