= NLIU Bhopal =

Law University in Madhya Pradesh, India

National Law Institute University Bhopal
- Motto in English: The diligent grow happily
- Type: National Law University
- Established: 1997; 29 years ago
- Academic affiliations: BCI; UGC; AIU
- Chancellor: Chief Justice of Madhya Pradesh High Court
- Vice-Chancellor: S. Surya Prakash
- Location: Bhopal, Madhya Pradesh, India; 23°11′13.4″N 77°21′48″E
- Campus: Urban, residential
- Visitor: Chief Justice of India
- Colors: Red and yellow
- Nickname: NLIU / NLU Bhopal
- Website: www.nliu.ac.in

The National Law Institute University Bhopal (NLIU Bhopal) is a public law school and a National Law University located in Bhopal, India. Established in 1997 by the State of Madhya Pradesh, it is the second law school established under the National Law School system.It is one of the most prestigious and best law schools in India.

The university launched its first academic program in 1998, with Indian jurist V.S. Rekhi as the Director. The university admits around 120 candidates each year through the Common Law Admission Test for the B.A. LL.B. course and around 60 candidates for the B.Sc. LL.B. course. The postgraduate courses offered at the university are the Masters of Law (LL.M.) degree and the Master of Cyber Law & Information Security (MCLIS) degree.

The university is a member of the Association of Indian Universities, and the visitor of the university is the Chief Justice of India. It works with the High Court of Madhya Pradesh and the National Judicial Academy. Since 2009, NLIU has stationed the Rajiv Gandhi National Cyber Law Center, established by the Ministry of Human Resource Development, Government of India.

== History ==
J.S. Verma had proposed the first National Law School at Bhopal. However, major action would not be taken on this proposition until the National Law Institute University was set up in Bhopal by Act No. 41 of 1997 (or NLIU Act, 1997, which was later substituted by Act No. 06 of 2018). Its first program was launched in 1998, and courses commenced on 1 September 1998.

The Masters of Law (LL.M.) program was launched in 2007, producing its first graduates in 2009. The establishment of Student Bodies, Academic Cells and associations started in 2002 with the establishment of the NLIU Moot Court Association. The Centre for Business and Commercial Law and the Rajiv Gandhi National Cyber Law Centre were established in 2008. The university published the first edition of Indian Law Review in November 2009. The NLIU Law Review was first published in 2010, and the NLIU Journal of Intellectual Property Law was first published in 2012.

In November 2017, nearly 400 students participated in a week-long protest outside the university gate, accusing Singh, the Director of the university, of favouritism. Following the protests, Singh, who had been holding the position for the past 10 years, resigned. The Chief Justice of India of the time, Hemant Gupta, intervened to resolve the crisis. The Madhya Pradesh High Court began the process of appointing a new director of the university. At the same time, a committee was established to examine administrative mismanagement. With this, the protests ended and classes resumed.

In October 2023, NLIU Bhopal hosted an event by the Young Thinkers' Forum, inaugurated by the union minister of environment, forest and climate change Bhupender Yadav. The event featured speeches and literature that were Islamophobic and hostile towards Christians, along with posters deriding and villainizing academics and intellectuals who had previously opposed or criticized the Bharatiya Janata Party (BJP). Many students protested, citing discrimination against minorities, trans people, and feminists. Vice-chancellor S. Surya Prakash stated that NLIU did not endorse the ideas presented and did not anticipate the nature of the event. Despite protests, the university allowed the event to proceed.

== Academics ==
University rankings

Law – India
- NIRF (2023): 18
- India Today (2022): 3

In 2023, it was ranked 18th on the list of law universities by India's Board of Education National Institute Ranking Framework (NIRF). NLIU was also ranked third among law colleges in India by India Today in 2021 and 2022.

== Gallery ==
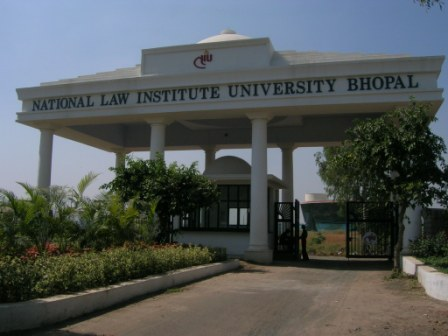
Main gate

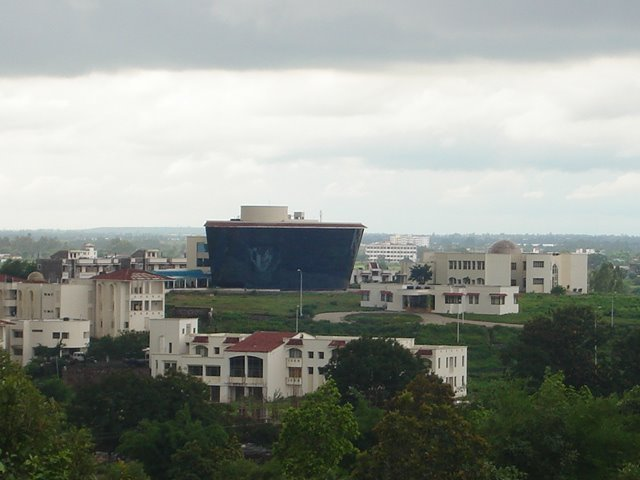
Campus

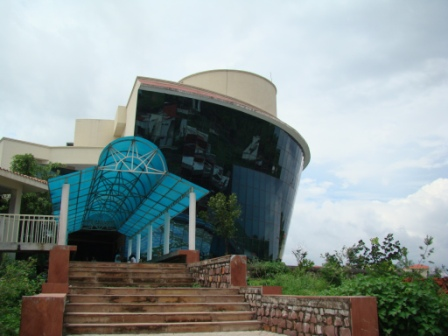
Gyan Mandir

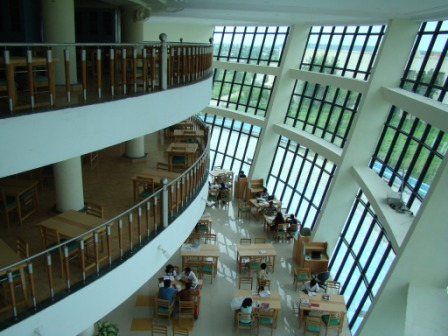
Library

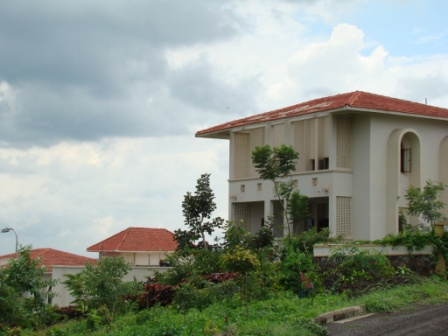
Hostels

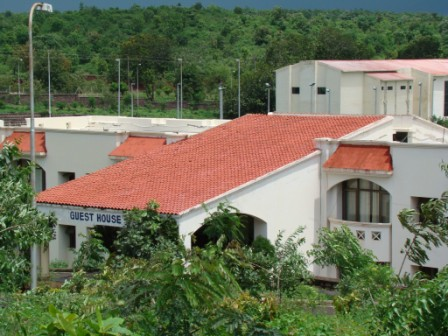
Guest house

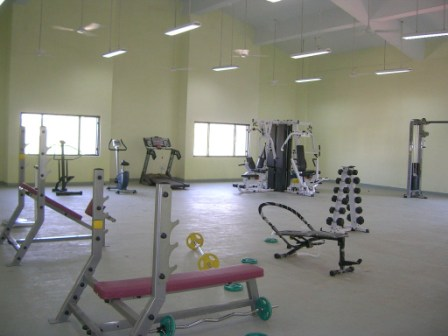
Gym

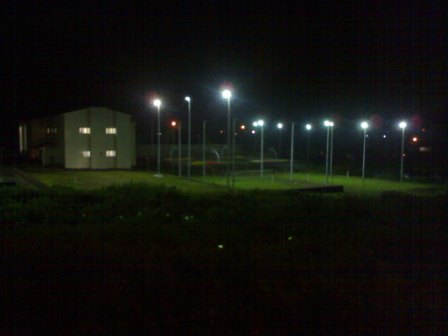
Fields and Courts

== See also ==
- Rajiv Gandhi National Cyber Law Centre
- Legal education in India
- List of law schools in India
- Bhopal
- CLAT
- Madhya Pradesh High Court
