= Anita Kaul =

Indian politician

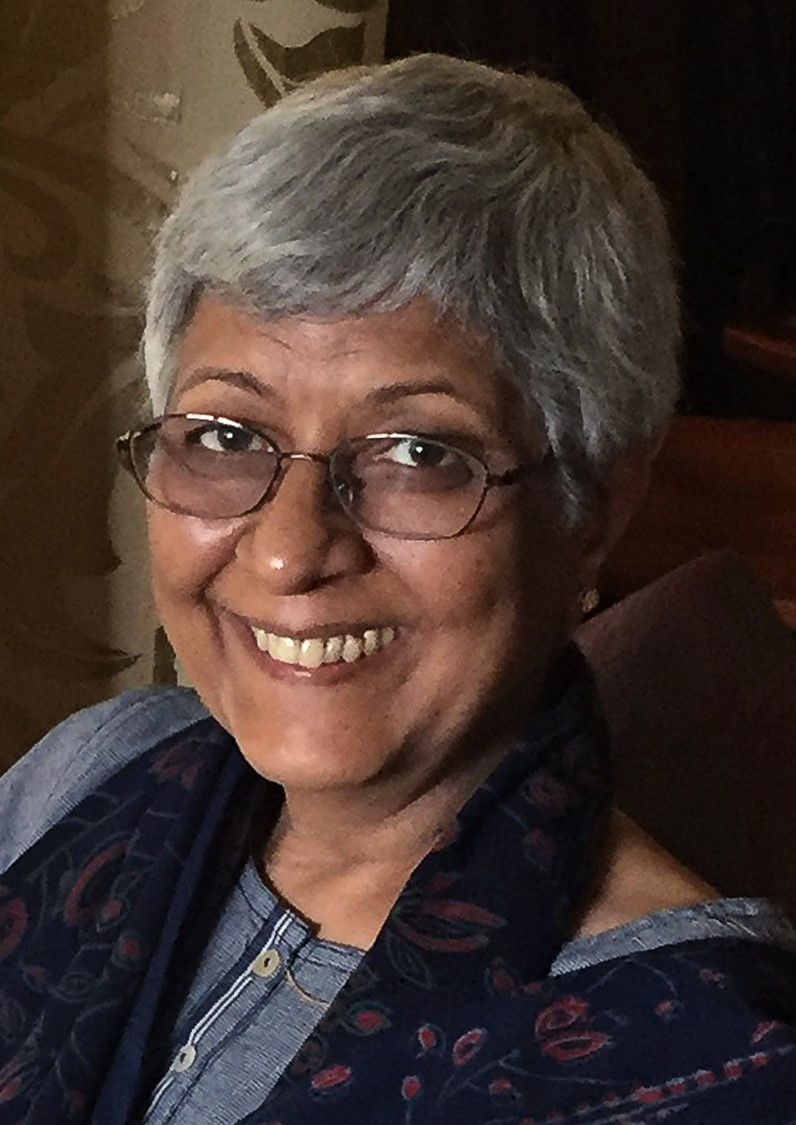
- Born: 19 September 1954
- Died: 10 October 2016 (aged 62)
- Occupation: Indian Administrative Service
- Years active: 1979-2016

Anita Kaul (née Kripalani; 19 September 1954 – 10 October 2016) was an Indian Administrative Service officer best known for her contributions to the Indian education sector. She was a defining voice of the Right to Education movement and one of the principal architects of the Right of Children to Free and Compulsory Education Act, 2009 which made education a fundamental right for every child in India. Anita was also well known for her role in expanding the Nali Kali ('joyful learning') approach to primary schools in India. Heralded as one of Karnataka's most 'successful, innovative and revolutionary' reform programs, the pedagogic innovations of Nali Kali during Anita Kaul's tenure have been described as 'little short of a renaissance' in Indian education. Her initiatives received national acclaim for their impact on India's educational landscape. Beyond education, she played a crucial role in policy and governance, serving as Secretary, Department of Justice, where she worked on judicial reforms and access to justice initiatives. Anita Kaul retired as Secretary, Department of Justice, the highest ranking civil servant in the Ministry of Law and Justice, Government of India.

== Early life and education ==
Anita was born in Bombay, India on 19 September 1954. She received degrees in linguistics and German before joining the Indian Administrative Service (IAS) in 1979.

== Career highlights ==
=== Education ===
==== Right to Education Act and National Curriculum Framework: 2006–2012 ====
The highlight of Anita Kaul's tenure in the Department of School Education was coordinating the passage of the Right to Education Act. Described as a 'harbinger of a new era', the enactment of the Right to Education Act resulted in India becoming the 135th country in the world where education is a fundamental right. Anita Kaul also played a critical role in successfully defending the Right to Education Act before the Supreme Court of India including some of its most contentious provisions – (a) at least 25% from disadvantaged groups are admitted in Class 1 and (b) the "no detention" and "no expulsion" provisions. Beyond her legal efforts, she was known for her deep commitment to the inclusivity of the Act, ensuring that it remained true to its original values and principles.

In 2005–06, Anita served as Secretary, National Council of Educational Research and Training (NCERT) where she led efforts in the drafting of the National Curriculum Framework 2005 (NCF). The NCF sets out what should be taught to children in India and how. It continues to serve as the statutory framework for syllabus and teaching practices for schools across India.

==== Education in Karnataka and the Nali Kali reforms: 1996–2000 ====
In the 1990s, as Project Director of the District Primary Education Programme (DPEP) and Secretary, Department of Education in the Government of Karnataka, Anita played an important role in bringing the Nali Kali (or joyful learning) approach to learning to Karnataka's primary schools. Developed with UNICEF assistance, the Nali Kali strategy adopted creative learning practices in a joyful, affirming, non-threatening environment that helped significantly improve enrollment, particularly of girls, in rural primary schools in Karnataka. Since 2000, the Nali Kali-inspired, joyful learning strategies have expanded to several Indian states, including Tamil Nadu, Rajasthan, Madhya Pradesh, Assam, Jharkhand, Maharashtra and Chhattisgarh. Academic studies have shown that the Nali Kali reforms provided striking insights into how schools can deal more sensitively and effectively with issues of social inequality and exclusion. Heralded as one of Karnataka's most 'successful, innovative and revolutionary' reform programs, the pedagogic innovations of Nali Kali during Anita Kaul's tenure have been described as 'little short of a renaissance' in Indian education.

==== National Literacy Mission: 1988–1992 ====
Earlier in her career, Anita served as Director of the National Literacy Mission (1988–1992) where she was instrumental in taking the Total Literacy Campaigns (TLCs) from less than ten districts to almost 100 districts across India. Started in Ernakulam district in 1989, the 'TLC model' of mass literacy constituted the principal strategy of eradicating illiteracy in India during the 1990s.

Anita Kaul at a National Literacy Mission training workshop (1992)	Anita Kaul representing India at the "World Conference on Education for All" (1990) in Thailand

=== Other career highlights ===
A large part of Anita's work centered around empowering women. During her tenure in the Department of School Education, she strengthened the Mahila Samakhya programme which sought to enhance self-esteem and self-confidence of women to enable them to make informed choices in areas like education and employment. Similarly, as Director, Women and Child Development in the Government of Karnataka (1993–1995) and Director General of the State Institute of Rural Development (2002–2006), Anita conceptualized and implemented training programs that were large-scale, participatory and satellite-based.

Following her retirement from the Indian Administrative Service, Anita served as Director of the Council for Social Development, a research organization set up in 1962 by Durgabai Deshmukh. She died in October 2016.

== Anita Kaul Lecture Series ==
In honor of Anita Kaul's contributions to education and social policy, an annual memorial lecture series was established by the Centre for Equity Studies, Rainbow Foundation India and Mobile Creches.Each year, the lecture features prominent educators, policymakers, and activists, reflecting on issues central to her work—education, equity, and democratic governance.

Notable speakers and chairs have included:

- 2017: Krishna Kumar, eminent educationist and former Director, NCERT, on education and inequality, chaired by Shanta Sinha, former chairperson, National Commission for Protection of Child Rights.
- 2018: Amita Dhanda, eminent academician and activist, on the legal and societal challenges of realizing the Right to Education, chaired by Aruna Roy, social activist and Founder, Mazdoor Kisan Shakti Sangathan.
- 2019: Anita Rampal, Dean, Faculty of Education, Delhi University, on transformative education, chaired by Anshu Vaish, former Secretary, Department of School Education and Literacy, Government of India.
- 2021: Pamela Philipose, senior journalist and academic, on the role of media in India's democracy, chaired by Harish Khare, senior journalist and former media advisor to the Prime Minister of India.
- 2022: Farah Naqvi, writer and activist, on education for a democratic India, chaired by Meenakshi Gopinath, political scientist and former Principal, Lady Shri Ram College.
- 2023: P. Sainath, journalist, on the need for inclusive journalism, chaired by Syeda Hameed, activist and former Planning Commission member.
- 2024: Soumya Swaminathan, former Chief Scientist, WHO, on inclusive health policy, chaired by Sujatha K. Rao, health policy expert and former Health Secretary, Government of India.
- 2025: The eighth Anita Kaul Memorial Lecture, “Nurturing Every Child: The Time Is NOW”, was delivered by Vandana Prasad on 9 October 2025 and chaired by K. Srinath Reddy.
- 2026: The ninth Anita Kaul Memorial Lecture, “The Great Disconnect: Women’s Livelihoods and India’s Development Story”, is scheduled for 24 October 2026, with Jayati Ghosh as speaker and Renana Jhabvala as chair.

The lecture series continues to serve as a platform for critical dialogue, advancing policies that promote education, equity, and justice, echoing the principles Anita Kaul championed throughout her career.

== See also ==
- Right of Children to Free and Compulsory Education Act
- Literacy in India
- Education in India
- Ministry of Human Resource Development
- Indian Administrative Service
