= Sudhir Dhagamwar =

Indian cricketer (1951–2010)

Personal information
- Full name: Sudhir Marutirao Dhagamwar
- Born: 20 January 1951; Nagpur, Maharashtra, India
- Died: 10 April 2010 (aged 59); Nagpur, Maharashtra, India
- Batting: Right-handed
- Bowling: Leg break

Domestic team information
- Years: Team
- 1972/73–1977/78: Vidarbha

Career statistics
Competition	FC
Matches	11
Runs scored	288
Batting average	14.40
100s/50s	–/1
Top score	77
Balls bowled	60
Wickets	–
Bowling average	–
5 wickets in innings	–
10 wickets in match	–
Best bowling	–
Catches/stumpings	4/–
- Source: Cricinfo, 15 May 2010

Sudhir Marutirao Dhagamwar (20 January 1951 – 10 April 2010) was an Indian cricketer. Dhagamwar was a right-handed batsman who was a leg break bowler.

Dhagamwar made his first-class debut for Vidarbha against Madhya Pradesh in the 1972/73 Ranji Trophy. Dhagamwar represented Vidarbha in 11 first-class matches from 1972/73 to the 1977/78 season, with his final first-class match coming against Uttar Pradesh. In his 11 matches for Vidarbha, he scored 288 runs at a batting average of 14.40, with a single half century score of 77. Dhagamwar later became a coach for Vidarbha.

== Family And Relatives ==
His father was Marutirao Dhagamwar, and mother was Nirmala Dhagamwar.

His wife is Mrunalini Dhagamwar.

He left behind two sons named Chandrashekhar (aka Shekhar) and Ashutosh, who have now changed their surname to Dev. They used to be Chess, Table-Tennis as well as Cricket players at district or state levels.

Now they are doing corporate jobs in private companies.

Sudhir Dhagamwar's real paternal uncle was D. Narsinh (= Narsimha Dhagamwar).

Geeta Sane was his real paternal aunt.

His cousin sister was Vasudha Dhagamwar.

He is also related to the Andhra politician D. Sripada Rao who was the son of the real sister of his father.

== Health And Death ==
Sudhir Dhagamwar was suffering from diabetes since 1990s. In late 2000s, his eye health deteriorated quite a bit due to prolonged diabetes. And he had eye-surgery at Chennai.

Finally, Dhagamwar died at Nagpur, Maharashtra on 10 April 2010.
