= Chandita Mukherjee =

Indian filmmaker (1952–2023)

- Born: April 20, 1952; Tokyo, Japan
- Died: 18 April 2023 (aged 70); Mumbai, Maharashtra, India
- Education: University of Delhi, Film and Television Institute of India
- Occupations: Filmmaker, science communicator
- Known for: Bharat Ki Chhap, Totanama

Chandita Mukherjee (20 April 1952 – 18 April 2023) was an Indian documentary filmmaker, science communicator and activist. She was the recipient of two National Film Awards. She conceived and directed the TV series Bharat Ki Chhap on the history of science and technology in India. She was the executive director of Comet Media Foundation.

== Early life and education ==
Chandita Mukherjee was born on 20 April 1952. As a child she lived in many cities in India and other countries. She completed her schooling in New York. She then moved to Delhi, and studied sociology at Miranda House, University of Delhi. After graduation, she enrolled for a film direction course at Film and Television Institute of India (FTII). She was among the first women graduates of FTII's direction course. She braved family opposition and worked her way through the course, supporting herself by doing a number of odd jobs.

== Career as filmmaker ==
After graduating from FTII in 1975, Mukherjee started her career making TV programmes for children with the Satellite Instructional Television Experiment (SITE). Right from the outset, she worked on issues related to science and technology in India. When the SITE project ended in 1976, she moved to Bombay (now Mumbai), where she would live and work for the rest of her life.

During the mid-1980s, Mukherjee was engaged in an ambitious project - the making of Bharat Ki Chhap, a TV series on the history of science and technology in India. She and her team travelled extensively across the country for the shooting of the series, which took more than four years to complete. It was aired on Doordarshan in 1989.

During 1989–1991, Mukherjee was a Ravi J Mathai Fellow at the National Institute of Design (NID), Ahmedabad. Her association with NID proved fruitful. Her film Totanama (1991), based on Tutinama and produced by NID, won the National Film Award for Best Short Fiction Film. The citation read: "For its traditional style, narrative structure and good production values."

In 1994, Mukherjee received a second National Award for Another Way of Learning. The film was a record of educational innovation at Eklavya, particularly the Hoshangabad Science Teaching Programme. The award was in the category of Best Scientific Film. The citation read: "For being at once precise and warm in its approach to teaching processes."

In 1997, Mukherjee made Slowly but Surely, a film on the tendu leaf pickers of Rajasthan. The film depicts the struggles of the women engaged in tendu leaf collection to get better remuneration for their work.

In 2012, Mukherjee travelled across the country to shoot a film on mathematics education in India. A short version was screened at the International Congress on Mathematical Education held in Seoul, South Korea. The final cut, entitled Maths for Sum or Maths for All?, won a special jury award at the Vigyan Prasar festival in 2014.

In 2019, the International Association of Women in Radio and Television (IAWRT) chose Chandita Mukherjee as the Executive Producer of a collaborative documentary entitled Displacement and Resilience. Mukherjee got five other women filmmakers from around the world to direct individual segments. Apart from coordinating the whole project, she directed one segment and edited the final version of the film. The film won the P K Nair Critics’ Award for the best documentary at the South Asian Short Film Festival held in Kolkata.

== Other contributions ==
During the early 1980s, Chandita Mukherjee provided audio-visual support to the campaigns of the Forum against Oppression of Women. She took photographs of demonstrations, raĺlies and sit-ins, and shared them with mainstream media.

In 1985, Mukherjee set up Comet Media Foundation, a non-profit organisation that situates itself at the juncture of science, technology and society. She remained executive director of the organisation until her death. Besides carrying out a number of other activities, Comet Media runs a store called Learning Ladder, which stocks children's books, toys, learning aids and resource materials for teachers and parents. Its unique mix of offerings has drawn appreciative comments.

Apart from Comet, Mukherjee was associated with other NGOs in different capacities. She was a founding member of Science Education Group, a society set up for the propagation of general science awareness and scientific temper among people. She was also a founding trustee of the Avehi Public Charitable Trust, set up in 1981.

Mukherjee was a member of the National Focus Group on Educational Technology, set up by NCERT as part of the NCF 2005 exercise.

== Death ==
Mukherjee died on 18 April 2023, at the age of 70.

== Filmography ==
- Desha sa Kulu re Pyara (1976)
- Experience India (1978)
- Ghadwa art - Changing traditions (1979)
- Bharat Ki Chhap (1989)
- Totanama (1991)
- Another Way of Learning (1994)
- Slowly but Surely (1997)
- Maths for Sum or Maths for All? (2014)
- Displacement and Resilience (2019)

== Awards and honours ==
=== National film awards ===
- 39th National Film Awards: Totanama - best short fiction film
- 42nd National Film Awards: Another Way of Learning - best scientific film

=== Other honours ===
- Prix Jule Verne for Bharat Ki Chhap, 1989
- Special jury prize for Maths for Sum or Maths for All? at National Science Film Festival and Competition organized by Vigyan Prasar, 2014
- P K Nair Critics’ Award for the best documentary for Displacement and Resilience at the second South Asian Short Film Festival, Kolkata, 2019
- At the Madurai Film Festival held in December 2019, she was honoured with a retrospective of her films.
