= A.T. Markose =

Indian lawyer

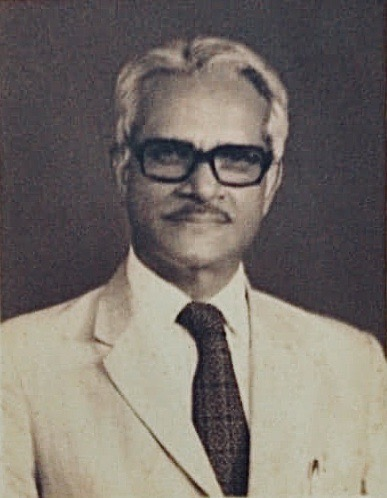
- A.T Markose
- Born: Anithottam Thomas Markose; 20 June 1920; Muvattupuzha, Travancore Kingdom, Princely State (presently in State of Kerala)
- Died: 15 October 1977 (aged 56–57)
- Education: Banaras Hindu University Lucknow University
- Occupations: Law Professor, Jurist
- Known for: Pioneering Post Graduate Legal Studies in India, Founder Director of Indian Law Institute & School of Legal Studies, Cochin University

Anithottam Thomas Markose (20 June 1920 – 15 October 1977) was an Indian jurist at the International Labour Organization and Director of Indian Law Institute (1957–1963). He was the first editor of Journal of the Indian Law Institute, an academic journal. He established the School of Legal Studies in 1962 at Cochin University and was Deputy Judge (1965–1977) at the International Administrative Tribunal of the International Labour Organization in Geneva, Switzerland.

== Life and education ==
A.T. Markose was born on 20 June 1920 to a Syrian Christian Orthodox family in Muvattupuzha, in the South Indian state of Kerala. He was the eldest of 9 siblings. This included his brother A.T. Pathrose who was a politician for the Kerala Congress.

Having attended a local Malayalam medium primary school, A.T. Markose went to the St. Johns English High School in Vadakara where K.R. Narayan, later to be President of India, was a contemporary On completing his Intermediate year at the Union Christian College of Aluva in Kerala, in keeping with the remarkable secular ethos of the time, from 1939 to 1944, he did his LLB and LLM at the Banares Hindu University in Varanasi, Uttar Pradesh in North India. A.T. Markose proceeded to become the first LLD from the Lucknow University under Professor R.U Singh.

A.T. Markose first started off as a practising lawyer in Ooty with Advocate Mankavil George Matthew. He married a daughter of M.G. Matthew, Mary Mathew, in 1946 and they went on to have four daughters. His daughters are Shanta Matthai, Sheila George and Rani Koshy. His third daughter is the UK-based economist and academic, Sheri Marina Markose.

== Career and achievements ==
In 1956, A.T. Markose published his magnum opus "The Judicial Control of Administrative Action In India", which was digitized in December 2005 and remains a reference book for LLM in India. The book has been influential in conveying his abiding confidence in the role of the judiciary to be the bulwark against arbitrary power of the executive and the administrative state.

Upendra Baxi has referred to A.T. Markose (Cochin) as one of the Five Horsemen, who included G.S Sharma (Jaipur), Anandjee (Benares), R.U Singh (Lucknow) and T.K Tripathi (Delhi)) as innovators "who through their diverse labours, brought to a decisive end the Ancien régime of Indian legal education".

His legacy of work as Founder Director of the Indian Law Institute (1957–1963) and large number of publications in the areas of Public Law, Administrative Law and Constitutional Law, is acknowledged to have helped the fledgling India democracy to strengthen the rule of law.

His international reach in judicial practice and legal studies started with his post doctoral studies as a Research Fellow at the Harvard Law School (1956–1957) and the reconnoitring visits made to the US in the context of setting the agenda for the Indian Law Institute. He was Principal of the Law College in Ernakulam and then worked to establish the postgraduate law degree in what was to become Cochin University. While remaining a Professor and Dean of the Law School in Cochin University, where he was the moving force behind the Legal Studies Centre set up there in 1962, A.T. Markose also pursued an international career. He served as Deputy Judge of the International Administrative Tribunal of the International Labour Organization in Geneva.

== Death ==
A.T. Markose died in London at the age of 57 on 15 October 1977 on a visit to the UK as a British Council Fellow to research on the final years of the British Privy Council which formerly acted as the High Court of Appeal for the entire British Empire and continues to receive judicial appeals from independent Commonwealth countries.

== Legacy ==
His legacy is characterized by significant contributions to legal scholarship and a distinguished career in pedagogy and communication. Many of his former students and colleagues subsequently attained prominent positions within the legal profession, continuing to advance his methodologies in legal education and research. N.R. Madhava Menon, the founder of the National Law Schools of India, and others like George H. Godbois Jr have professed a lifelong admiration and affection for their mentor.

A.T. Markose was a polymath with literary interests. His special interest in the style of ‘poems in prose’ led to a book in Malayalam titled Kavithakal Gadyathil (Verses in Prose) that was published by A. T. Markose, Kottayam: NBS, 1966. In an interview in 2011, the poet and writer, Jeet Thayil, the nephew of A.T. Markose, said that his uncle introduced him to the poetry of Baudelaire.

== Memorial Events ==
Since 2011, Cochin University for Science and Technology (CUSAT), School of Legal Studies has been organizing the A.T Markose Memorial Moot Court Competition in honour of their founding professor. In 2020, the A.T. Markose Memorial Moot Court Competition has been jointly organized as the 1st Surana and Surana & CUSAT School of Legal Studies event. In 2011, A.T. Markose was posthumously honoured as Distinguished Law Teacher by the Society of Indian Law Firms (SILF) and the Madhava Menon Institute of legal Advocacy.
