= Vasudha Dhagamwar =

Indian lawyer, writer and activist

Vasudha Vasanti Dhagamwar
- Born: 1940
- Died: 2014 (aged 73–74)

Academic work
- Institutions: Delhi University

Dr. Vasudha Vasanti Dhagamwar (1940–2014) was a lawyer, scholar, researcher, writer and an activist. She was the Founder Director of Multiple Action Research Group (MARG) and was one of the four signatories of the Mathura Open Letter to the Supreme Court of India in 1979 in regard to the Mathura rape case, which helped spark a national movement against sexual violence in India.

== Early life and education ==
Her mother, Geeta Sane, was a writer and a feminist. Her father, Narasimha Dhagamwar, was a lawyer and was active in the Indian freedom movement. She attended the Indian Law Society's Law College. She also took a degree in economics and politics from Oxford University, an LLB from Mumbai University and a Ph.D. in legal history from the School of Oriental and African Studies.

== Career ==
Dhagamwar was one of the signatories, along with Professor Upendra Baxi, Professor Lotika Sarkar, and Raghu Nath Kelkar to the open letter, known as the Mathura Open Letter, written to the Supreme Court of India in 1979, which questioned the acquittal of the rapists in the Mathura rape case, after which the Supreme Court of India accepted what later became a landmark case. It became the rallying point of a sustained campaign on the issue of gender-based violence in India.

In the early 1980s, she traveled and worked in the interior tribal belt of Akrani and Akalkuva in Maharashtra on the issue of tribal rights and law. She was elected as an Ashoka Fellow in 1982.

In 1985, she set up the Multiple Action Research Group (MARG), an NGO in Delhi, which includes a focus on promoting legal awareness, advocacy, and public interest litigation.

She taught at Miranda House, Delhi and at the Law Department, Pune University.

Vasudha is known for her sustained work for the rights of displaced people, prisoners and publishing legal booklets.

She was also a member of the legal experts committee of the National Commission for Women, and a member of the Executive body of the Commonwealth Human Rights Initiative.

She also filed several cases relating to custodial violence and torture.

== Selected works ==
=== Books ===
- Dhagamwar, Vasudha (1974). Law, Power and Justice: The Protection of Personal Rights in the Indian Penal Code. Sage. ISBN 978-0-8039-9441-6.
- Industrial Development and Displacement: The People of Korba (2003) (co-author)
- Dhagamwar, Vasudha (2006). Role and Image of Law in India: The Tribal Experience (1st ed.). Sage Publications Pvt. Ltd.
- The Law of Resettlement of Project Displaced Persons in Madhya Pradesh
- Women and Divorce
- Reading on Uniform Civil Code and Gender and Child Just Laws
- Dhagamwar, Vasudha (1997). Criminal justice or chaos?. Har Anand. ISBN 978-81-241-0418-7.

== Papers and other work ==
- Dhagamwar Vasudha (1981) PROBLEMS OF IMPLEMENTING AGRARIAN LEGISLATION IN INDIA, Journal of Indian Law Institute, 23(2) 228-254
- Dhagamwar Vasudha (1989) Towards the uniform civil code
- Dhagamwar Vasudha (1992) Much ado about nothing, Down to Earth
- Dhagamwar Vasudha (2006) The Paradip Project: Harbinger of Light or of Darkness?
- Dhagamwar Vasudha (2009) Panch Parmeshwar, EPW 44(31) 13-16

== Critical reception ==
In a review of Law, Power and Justice, a book based on Dhagamwar's Ph.D. thesis, Joseph Minattur writes for the Journal of the Indian Law Institute that "it is a study in the sociology of law, which, as Andre Beteille points out in his foreword, is a new and unexplored field in the domain of Indian studies", and later in the review states, "Dhagamwar's own comment, though perhaps trite, is eminently relevant. She says: [I]t is not enough to pass laws. [I]t is essential to be vigilant to secure their proper enforcement. It is a grave error to assume that because a law is made, it is automatically known to all, invoked by the sufferers, and applied by the government officials." Susan Visvanathan writes in a review for the Sociological Bulletin, "Some of her most compelling arguments come from the ground, where she shows that slavery, dacoity and sati are not just 19th century curiosities but hard realities today", and that this is "a valuable book, both for its very brief but startling entry into colonial usages of law [...] and for its sense of absolute commitment to the problems of the disprivileged, whether women or the poor." In a review of the second edition of the book, S. P. Sathe writes for Economic and Political Weekly that it is "an improvement in content as well as production. It would be of great use to all those who are interested in studying the interaction between law and society and particularly on the use of law as an instrument of social change."

In a review of Women and Divorce, Amita Dhanda writes for the Journal of the Indian Law Institute that the relevance of this study based on interviews with 65 women from the Pune District of Maharashtra is "in the questions it raises", and "In not providing ready answers, Dhagamwar has invited both thought and research on the phenomenon of legal awareness and the need to look at factors beyond the law to assess the effectiveness of law."

In a review of Towards the Uniform Civil Code, Werner F. Menski writes for the Bulletin of the School of Oriental and African Studies, University of London, "Dhagamwar's splendid study focuses on the fundamental contradictions between forms of societal resistance and legal and political pressures towards uniformity in modern India, in other words, the basically the irreconcilable clash between the aims of 'social engineering through law' school of thought and the social realities perceived as 'traditional'."

In a review of Role and Image of Law in India: The Tribal Experience, Mona Bhan writes in Political and Legal Anthropology Review, "Law in Dhagamwar's analysis is far from a neutral arbiter of individual or collective rights", and "In many instances throughout the book, the theoretical clarity and rigor in Dhagamwar's text are compromised by her agendas as an activist." Rukmini Sen, writing for Sociological Bulletin, describes the book as "an exceptional comprehensive study of the social and legal status of three tribes in India: the Bhils, the Pahadiyas, and the Santals" and "a seminal contribution to the sub-discipline of sociology of law."
