= Forum against Oppression of Women =

Feminist organisation

The Forum against Oppression of Women is a feminist organisation based in Mumbai, India. It originated as the Forum against Rape in 1980, organising protests in the city to the judgement in the Mathura rape case. Autonomous women's collectives are groups that emerged in 1980s in Indian context, to raise and work on issues of gender rights, creating political language and recognition of sexual and domestic violence. It departed from party affiliated women's groups and established gender issues as political issues that needs to be understood structurally in intersections with caste, religion, ethnicity, class, sexuality . It departed from the 'biological essentialist' argument of sex as the basis of gender discrimination and violence and tried to understand how gender experience, formation is very much depended on plural and intersecting structural marginalisations.

== Origins ==
A protest letter against the Mathura rape case judgement in 1979 sparked a new debate about Indian laws about rape. In Mumbai, forty women who saw this letter organised a public meeting on 23 February 1980, to protest the judgement. The group referred to itself as the Forum against Rape. Acknowledging the much broader scope of concerns it wished to address, the group renamed itself Forum against Oppression of Women (FAOW). Founding members including Lotika Sarkar, Chayanika Shah, Upendra Baxi, Raghunath Kelkar, Vasudha Dhagamwar, and Sonal Shukla.

== Purpose ==
The group has gone on to serve as "an umbrella group for a cultural group, a group working with trade unions, and a space for interactions with women on a daily basis—the Women's Centre".

== Activities ==
Since the 1980s, FAOW has taken on advocacy relating to a range of women's rights issues. A few examples follow.

=== Rape ===
Activism around the Mathura judgement prompted the founding of the Forum against Rape, which organised a public meeting and rally to protest the judgement. FAOW took up other cases of rape over the years, including the Turbhe case.

=== Sex-selective abortion ===
FAOW was an active part of the Forum Against Sex Determination and Sex Preselection (FASDAP). Activism in the mid-1980s around sex-selective abortion had two objectives: to get a law passed on sex determination tests and to create awareness around the issue.

"Right from the start, it became evident that since the large majority of people were not likely to support the campaign spontaneously, we would have to develop newer forms to highlight this social issue. So, the campaign (concentrated on) influencing the attitudes of people against the test, daughters, women in general; of women themselves who would readily sacrifice anything for sons; the medical community and other informed persons."

=== Right to work and better workplace conditions ===
The ban on bar dancers in Maharashtra was seen as raising the right to work and the right to better work conditions for all strata of women. In a 2013 statement on the case of the Indian diplomat in New York and her domestic helper, FAOW issued a statement:

"There are hundreds of thousands on domestic workers from developing countries like India, Sri Lanka, the Philippines etc. working in their own countries as well as in the developed world. When they work abroad, they leave their families and homes and go out to be able to earn more so that they can begin to live a little more comfortable life once they are old and cannot work. For most domestic workers, working here or abroad, this is a distant dream. The abuse these workers have to live with here as well as abroad is something one can barely imagine. Hence it is very disturbing that very few political parties or individuals have bothered to look at this issue and make it a big enough political plank for all the powerful to take note. ...We urge the Government of India to immediately sign and implement ILO Convention 189 on the rights of domestic workers and to take concrete steps of ensure the dignity and safety of citizens and working people inside and outside the country."

=== Submission to the Justice Verma Commission ===
Along with other Mumbai groups, FAOW made a submission to the Justice Verma Commission that identified three concerns:

We hereby place our concerns before you.

First of all we think that the committee should look at the entire gamut of sexual violence, not just "extreme" or "aggravated" cases. It should review all the laws relating to sexual assault and harassment, including the process of investigation, trial and speedy justice, the manner in which evidence (including medical and FSL) is collected and presented and recorded during the trial. This exercise of review for quicker investigation, speedier justice and trial needs to be done for ALL cases of sexual assault.

Secondly while we totally support the need for quicker trials, we are not sure if enhancement in punishment is a solution to the problem of sexual assault. We are particularly against the death penalty. Our vision of justice does not include death penalty, which is neither a deterrent nor an effective or ethical response to these acts of sexual violence. We append (Annexure 1) with this statement our reasons as to why we think the death penalty is not a punishment to be given for sexual assault. We also believe that castration, chemical or otherwise, should not be a punishment awarded to rapists. Any form of corporal punishment is barbaric and has no place in a civilised polity.

Thirdly we urge you to please carefully look at the Criminal Law Amendment Bill 2012 which has been passed by the Cabinet. It is changing the way in which rape will be looked at by making the law gender neutral. Sexual assault laws need to be gender sensitive, not gender neutral. Rape and sexual assault are gendered crimes, and whether they are committed on women, transgenders [sic] or men, they have to be looked at as "male pattern violence" prevalent in a patriarchal society. We have in our earlier recommendations (attached herein as Annexure 2) to the Home Minister urged that the suggested gender neutrality in the Bill be changed.

We ask for all sexual assault and rape laws to define sexual assault as a gendered crime committed by men on any person.
