= Sonal Shukla =

Indian feminist, activist, and teacher (1941–2021)

Sonal Shukla (1941–2021) was an Indian feminist, activist, teacher, writer, and social worker. She is known for her establishment of the Vacha Charitable Trust, a private organisation that founded a library for women scholars in Mumbai, India. She was a key member of the feminist protests regarding the Mathura Rape case, and a founding member of the Forum Against Oppression of Women, which successfully led a movement to reform India's laws against rape in the 1980s.

== Early and personal life ==
Shukla was born in Varanasi, India, in 1941. Her father, Ninu Majumdar, was a musician and radio presenter who created the Vividh Bharati station for India's national broadcaster, the All India Radio, and her mother, Kaumudi Munshi, was a classical singer. She had three siblings, Meena, Rajul, and Uday. She married Himanshu Shukla, a doctor.

== Work ==
Shukla began her career as a teacher, with an M.A. in Literature and an M.Ed. in comparative education. In her early career, she was closely involved in several public initiatives to improve the lives of sanitation workers and indigenous fishing communities in Mumbai. In response to widespread domestic violence, she initially turned her own home into a refuge for women survivors of domestic abuse for a period of two years.

Shukla was an active member of women's organisations in the 1970s and 1980s. In 1977, she founded the Socialist Women's Group which published a printed newsletter 'Feminist Network' in English and Hindi. Following the Mathura Rape Case in 1979, widespread protests were sparked by a letter published in this newsletter, and authored by four law professors who criticized Indian laws governing rape. She was a co-founder of the Forum Against Oppression of Women, an organization created in response to the judicial proceedings in the Mathura Rape case, in 1979, which campaigned successfully for reforms in India's laws governing rape.

In 1987, Shukla established the Vacha Charitable Trust in Mumbai - a private organisation that founded a library to support feminist research, as well as to provide resources to women students (such as international publications that were not easily accessible in India at the time). Initially housed in her home, the Trust later moved to a school, where Shukla established the library as an independent institution. The library houses over 3000 books, and in 1991, published collections of music as well as documentaries on the role of women in the Indian independence movement. The library also serves as an archive of feminist writing and literature in India, collecting women's magazines, and other writing by women.

Shukla also went on to publish a number of books and texts with Vacha, which challenged gender stereotypes. With Vacha, Shukla also conducted free school classes for primary school children from underprivileged backgrounds. In 1995, Shukla expanded Vacha to provide institutional support to children studying in municipal schools in Mumbai, creating 15 centers in slums in Mumbai, where skills including English language speech, photography and computers were taught for free. During the COVID-19 pandemic in India, Shukla organised a team of volunteers with Vacha, to provide free food, and personal supplies including menstrual hygiene products, to families in need, in Mumbai.

Shukla published a weekly column with a Gujarati newspaper from 1980 until her death in 2021, in which she wrote about a wide variety of issues, ranging from food, literature, and politics, to feminist ideas and women's rights. Some of her writing on the Gujarati author, Govardhanram Tripathi, has been published as part of broader studies on Indian literature. She has also written about pedagogy and education from the perspective of feminism, about teachers' unions, and about the depiction of women and families in folk literature in India.

In 2021, she was recognized by the Friedrich Ebert Foundation as a 'gender icon', and an illustrated book about her life, written by Jyoti Punwani, was released in her honor. Shukla has cited Indian poet and writer Rabindranath Tagore, as well as Mahatma Gandhi, as major influences on her work.

== Death ==
She died in Mumbai in 2021 at the age of 80 due to cardiac arrest.

== Publications ==
- (2008) Sonal Shukla, 'Family in Feminist Songs: A Continuity with Folk Literature' in Joy Deshmukh-Ranadive ed., Democracy in the Family: Insights from India (SAGE Publications) ISBN 8-132-10004-2
- (2008) Sonal Shukla, 'Promoting Women's Participation in a Teachers' Union: The Role of a Women's Committee' in Jackie Kirk ed., Women Teaching in South Asia (SAGE Publications) ISBN 8-132-10072-7
- (2010) Sonal Shukla and Pradnya Swargaonkar, 'The Adolescent Girl' in Vibhuti Patel, ed., Girls and Girlhoods at Threshold of Youth and Gender—A Vacha initiative (Delhi, The Women Press) ISBN 8-189-11027-6
- (2010) Sonal Shukla and Nischint Hora (eds), Experiencing Girlhood: Stories from Bastis in Mumbai (Vacha Charitable Trust).
