= Chayanika Shah =

Indian queer feminist, activist and educator

- Education: IIT-Bombay
- Organization(s): LABIA – A Queer Feminist LBT Collective Forum Against Oppression of Women Forum Against Sex Determination and Sex Preselection (FASDSP)
- Known for: Work and activism at the intersection of science, feminism, and queer rights.
- Notable work: Bharat ki Chaap We and Our Fertility: The politics of technological intervention No Outlaws in the Gender Galaxy (Zubaan Books) Space, Segregation, Discrimination: The Politics of Space in Institutions of Higher Education (Yoda Press)
- Movement: People’s science movement, Feminist and queer rights movement, Feminist science studies, Women in STEM

Chayanika Shah is a queer feminist, activist, educator involved in various women's rights movements in India since the late 1970s. She is known for her work in feminist science studies, initiating courses where science is explored using the lens of gender. Shah's work in science, feminism and queer rights, has involved a critique of science's control over women's bodies and sexualities. Shah has published several essays and publications on topics of gender, science and feminism and is a contributor in the field of feminism, queer rights and science.

Shah was one of the earliest members of the Forum Against Oppression of Women, Forum Against Sex Determination and Sex Preselection (FASDSP), a coalition of women's organisations. She is one of the founding members of a queer collective called LABIA – A Queer Feminist LBT Collective in 1995.

== Early life ==
Shah grew up in Nagpur (now a part of Maharashtra) in the 1960s-1970s. In 1977, she entered IIT-Bombay to earn a master's degree in physics, and receiving her PhD in 1986. She published her dissertation titled "Many Body Effects in Homogenous and Inhomogenous Electron Systems" in the mid-1980s, followed by a stint at the International Centre for Theoretical Physics in Trieste, Italy, where she attended summer school for researchers from developing countries.

She was one of the 70 women on IIT campus amongst 3000 men at a time when sexual harassment from colleagues and professors was rampant, despite efforts to make the campus a safe and equitable space. Shah, along with other women on campus, campaigned to rename the "Ladies’ Hostel" as "Hostel Number 10." In tandem, she helped reform the hostel's regulations as they restricted women.

In 1980, when the National Forum Against Rape (which later became the Forum against Oppression of Women) was set up in response to the Mathura rape case, Shah was among 200 women who attended the forum's first conference to discuss the importance of drafting laws for women. Around the same time, the Emergency, the Bhopal Gas tragedy and the heavily contested Sardar Sarovar dam Project were raising questions about technological progress in India. Scientists and activists around the country started organizing under the banner of People's Science Movement (PSM) and questioning science's emancipatory versus oppressive potential. As part of PSM, Shah volunteered for the Hoshangabad Science Teaching Programme which encouraged children to step outside the classroom and get their hands dirty. The idea was to inculcate “learning by doing” and deploy science in pursuit of social justice.

== Work ==
=== Feminist science studies ===
Shah is one of the earliest academics working in feminist science studies in India. She was a lecturer of physics (now retired) at K. J. Somaiya College of Science and Commerce, Mumbai. At the Advanced Centre for Women's Studies at Mumbai's Tata Institute of Social Sciences, Chayanika co-designed and co-taught a course on Feminist Science Studies, with sociologist Gita Chadha. She also designed and taught a course on Science Education at Tata Institute of Social Science, Mumbai. In association with various movements, she has campaigned, researched, taught, and written on the politics of population control and reproductive technologies, feminist studies of science, and sexuality and sexual rights.

=== Autonomous collectives ===
She has been part of two urban, autonomous collectives in Mumbai, India. The first, Forum Against Oppression of Women (The Forum), was founded in 1979, and the second, LABIA – A Queer Feminist LBT Collective, was founded in 1995.

The Forum was founded in January 1980 and Chayanika has been a member since 1983. Issues they have tackled include rape, domestic violence, personal laws, family laws, health issues, communalism, and most recently, concerns relating to civil rights and liberties. To tackle cases of domestic violence, members of the Forum set up another organisation called the Women's Centre in 1982, which was imagined to run in tandem with the Forum but has since become a separate organisation. The Forum was also a member of the Forum Against Sex Determination and Sex Preselection, which was a coalition of organisations formed in 1986.

Originally known as Stree Sangam, LABIA was founded by ten queer women at a cafe in Mumbai in 1995. Some of the initiatives they took include working to equip organisations working on domestic violence to take on cases of lesbian women and transgender people in particular, raising funds from people who are financially better off in the queer community for those in crisis, for education, for queer people living in isolated areas to travel and meet others like them. Chayanika conducted sexuality workshops through LABIA, and would open her workshops by questioning who a woman is, discussing gender, and leading debates that led to larger questions about how science produces knowledge.

=== Activism ===
As a queer feminist activist and member of LABIA, Chayanika has been an advocatie for decriminalisation, partnership rights, and anti-discrimination legislation for the LGBT community. Since 1995, she has been an active participant in the petition to repeal Section 377. Chayanika had been involved the Lawyers' collective case challenging the constitutionality of Section 377 since 2004.

In 1986, she, along with other activists advocated against population control methods such as hormonal implants and anti-fertility vaccines, and emphasised the need for transparency in contraceptive trials conducted by pharmaceutical companies and government. As part of FASDSP forum in 1988, they successfully lobbied for state bans on sex-selective abortions and sex determination tests in all hospitals, government-run or not.

She has also advocated for inclusive education in Indian Higher Education institutions. As a part of the research team at The Advanced Centre for Women's Studies, TISS, Mumbai, she and her peers documented discriminatory practices faced by queer students on campus across five areas, namely health, education, housing, public accommodation and political formations in a blog titled The Glass Closet. Shah has also questioned NCERT and NCPCR when they dropped a teacher training manual on school education that was inclusive of trans and other gender-nonconforming people on grounds that it would affect school children badly.

== Publications ==
Shah has co-authored several books, including “Bharat ki Chaap”, “We and Our Fertility: The politics of technological intervention”, “No Outlaws in the Gender Galaxy” (Zubaan Books), and “Space, Segregation, Discrimination: The Politics of Space in Institutions of Higher Education” (Yoda Press). She has also authored and co-authored several research papers published in journals such as Economic and Political Weekly.
