= Dhanda =

Dhanda is a surname. Notable people with surname include:

- Amarjeet Dhanda, Indian politician elected to the Haryana Legislative Assembly in 2019
- Amita Dhanda, Indian law professor and feminist
- Kamlesh Dhanda, Indian politician elected to the Haryana Legislative Assembly in 2019
- Mahipal Dhanda (born 1974), Indian politician
- Meena Dhanda, Indian philosopher
- Parmjit Dhanda (born 1971), British politician
- Pooja Dhanda (born 1994), Indian wrestler
- Prem Chandra Dhanda (1911–2013), Indian physician
- Yan Dhanda (born 1998), English footballer
