= Duddilla =

Dudilla (Telugu: దుద్దిళ్ళ) is a Telugu surname. Notable people with the surname include:

- Duddilla Sridhar Babu (born 1969)
- Duddilla Sripada Rao (1935–1999)
