= Bharat Ki Chhap =

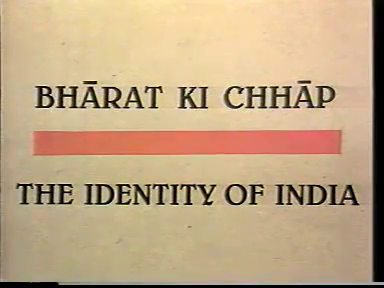
- TV title screen
- Genre: Documentary
- Screenplay by: Suhas Paranjape
- Directed by: Chandita Mukherjee
- Starring: Hemu Adhikari, Vasundhara Phadke, Urmi Juvekar, Sohaila Kapur, Aniruddha Limaye, Jayaram Tatachar
- Theme music composer: K. Narayanon
- Country of origin: India
- Original language: Hindi
- No. of seasons: 1
- No. of episodes: 13

Production
- Producers: COMET Project, Nehru Centre Bombay
- Cinematography: Ranjan Palit
- Editor: Renu Saluja

Original release
- Network: DD National
- Release: April 30, 1989

Bharat Ki Chhap (Identity of India) is a 13-episode Indian TV science documentary series chronicling the history of science and technology in India from pre-historic times until the present. It was directed by filmmaker Chandita Mukherjee and funded by the Department of Science and Technology's National Council for Science and Technology Communication (NCSTC). It was telecast on Doordarshan every Sunday morning starting 30 April 1989. It was introduced by Professor Yash Pal.

It projected in a pragmatic way alternative viewpoints on the subject of science as pioneered in India, in contrast with western scientific endeavours. It drew support from People's Science Movement.

A companion book was later published by Comet Project titled Bhārat Ki Chhāp: A Companion Book to the Film Series by Chayanika Shah, Suhas Paranjape, Swatija Manorama.

== Episodes ==
A total of 13 episodes were released.

Episode	Title	Note
1	Introduction	The episode sets up the intent of the films. We are introduced to the characters and narrators and understand the methods of knowing the past through material evidence. A glimpse of things to come, places to be visited and questions that will be explored are discussed.
2	The Stone Age	This episode captures the life in the Stone Age. We look at stone tool-making, investigate food gathering in pre-historic times through the habits of Halbi tribals in Bastar and travel to Buzahom in Kashmir to understand beginnings of farming and clay utensils for storage. And finally, we participate in a Navratri celebration in Bombay, linking its rituals to the discovery of agriculture 7000 years ago.
3	The Harappan Civilization	This episode discusses the Harappan civilization. Some of the characters travel to Harappan excavation sites – reporting their lifestyles, aspects of city planning and governance, jewellery making and terracota work.
4	The Iron Age	This episode introduces the Iron Age. We understand the Vedas and their growing influence on society, traditional iron-smelting techniques from Bastar, geometry through Shulbasutra and a changing social structure.
5	The Age of Codification	This episode discusses Buddhism and its influence in the North and the Southern rulers and kingdoms. We travel from the Sarnath to Kanheri caves near Mumbai to understand our Buddhist past and then to Pondicherry where we encounter a trade relationship with Rome, to Tiruchirapalli to understand the water reservoir system and the Grand Anaicut and finally to the Saraswati Mahal Library in Thanjavur, Tamil Nadu where we understand the texts of the times and their orthodoxy.
6	Ayurveda & Astronomy	This episode captures the traditions of Ayurveda and highly developed concepts of Astronomy. We start with investigating the Sushruta and Charaka traditions of Ayurveda and comparing it to the practises of a tribal medicine man in Bastar. Flourishing trades and techniques encouraged science; scholars like Aryabhata wrote about sine tables, pi, and the path of the planets, yet this knowledge was controlled.
7	Mathematics & Temple Architecture	In this episode we learn that techniques and sciences were limited to caste barriers. We understand the operations of 'zero' and its Indian origins. We briefly understand alchemy or Rasvidya that developed experimental chemistry, extraction methods for Zinc and the lost wax process for Chola bronzes. We also explore temple architecture from the towering gopuram to rock-cut caves of Ellora and an emerging architecture brought by the invading Arabs, Turks and Afghans.
8	Synthesis and Growth	Starting with Qutbuddin Aibak's reign in the north of India where science and technology were stagnant, this episode investigates the introduction of the printing press and new weapons through Portuguese rule in Goa. Science and technology flourished only for the needs of royalty such as armaments, developed water-supply systems and unmatched dyeing techniques for cloth.
9	Stagnation & a Changing World	This episode narrates the decline of science and the growing European interest in India. We travel to Jamasalaya in Gujarat, a ship-building port, where ships were made for European sea-faring in the 17th century. We understand the importance of the Renaissance in Europe, and its effects in Jaipur's Jantar Mantar (astronomical observatories built by Maharaja Jai Singh). Finally, we head to Mysore, where we see a rebelling Tipu Sultan develops armaments and his defeat as the beginning of colonial rule.
10	Colonialism & the Industrial Revolution	This episode discusses the reign of British in India and its effects. It compares the dying crafts traditions of steel-making near Hyderabad with low-cost high production models of Industrial Revolution. From reformists like Radha Ram Mohan Roy to scientists like Mahendralala Sircar a new class of educated Indians took the lead in reform and stressed education. By the end of the 19th century, political awareness was sweeping the country and a new spirit of nationalism emerging.
11	The Freedom Struggle & the Scientific Community	This episode captures the effects of 20th century science and technology. We examine the achievements of JC Bose, Meghnad Saha, PC Ray and Raman, their involvement in the national movement and the importance of science and technology in building an independent India.
12	Independent India 1947 to the Present	This episode discusses a post-independence India. We start by understanding self-sufficiency in energy through visits to ONGC rigs and an investigation into hydro-power projects like the Sardar Sarovar Dam. We also study the effects of the Green Revolution – both the good and the bad. Finally we travel to Bali Raja Dam which is built with consensus of the local communities, by them and of local materials.
13	Retrospect & Prospect	Taking from excerpts from past episodes we trace our journey and look at solutions for the future. We meet local organisations training people about afforestation, adult literacy and community health and visit an experimental school where exciting activities and lively discussions move beyond the textbooks. We investigate a city which has repeated cases of communal violence. And finally we discuss some interesting outcomes and possible directions with Professor Yashpal.
