= Pratiksha Baxi =

Indian sociologist and feminist legal scholar

Pratiksha Baxi (born 1970) is an Indian sociologist and feminist legal scholar, whose research has focused on courtroom procedures, ethnography and sexual violence against women. She is currently a member of the faculty in Jawaharlal Nehru University's Center for the Study of Law and Governance.Baxi is daughter of prominent legal scholar Upendra Baxi.

== Education and career ==
Baxi has a doctoral degree in sociology from the Delhi School of Economics, and founded the Law and Social Sciences Research Network at Delhi University, which hosts an annual interdisciplinary conference on law and social science research. Baxi has been awarded fellowships by the Kate Hamburger Center in Bonn, the University of Warwick, and the University Grants Commission in India.

In 2014, Baxi published Public Secrets of the Law: Rape Trials in India (Oxford University Press), which is one of the first works to present ethnographic research on courtrooms in India, focusing particularly on rape trials from a trial court in Ahmedabad, Gujarat. The book received positive reviews in research publications, with the Law & Society Review describing it as a "remarkable study of the public life of rape trials in India" and a review in The Journal of the Indian Law Institute calling it a "pioneering effort in the field of feminist legal research". Baxi has also published on law and sexual violence in the Indian Express, Economic and Political Weekly, and Outlook India, in addition to academic journals including Contributions to Indian Sociology, Third World Quarterly, and the Annual Review of Anthropology.

== Publications ==
Year	Title	Type	Details
2009	"Habeas corpus, juridical narratives of sexual governance"	Working paper	New Delhi: Centre for the Study of Law and Governance, Jawaharlal Nehru University.
2014	Public Secrets of Law: Rape Trials in India	Book	New Delhi: Oxford University Press.
2016	"'Carceral feminism' as judicial bias: The discontents around State v. Mahmood Farooqui"	Occasional paper	Interdisciplinary Law, Issue 3, Council for Social Development, Southern Regional Centre, Hyderabad.

== Awards ==
In 2021, Baxi won the Infosys Prize for Social Sciences, for "her work on sexual violence and jurisprudence."
