= Section 228A of the Indian Penal Code =

Act of the Parliament of India

Parliament of India
- Long title: An Act to prevent social victimization or ostracism of the victim of a sexual offence.
- Citation: Act No 43 of 1983
- Territorial extent: Republic of India
- Enacted by: Parliament of India

Legislative history
- Bill title: Criminal Law Amendment Act, 1983

Amended by
- The Criminal Law (Amendment) Act, 2018 (No. 22 of 2018)
- Status: In force

The Section 228A of the Indian Penal Code was inserted into the Indian Penal Code 1860 by the Criminal Law amendment Act 1983 by the Parliament of India to prevent social victimization or ostracism of the victim of a sexual offence. The law provides for up to two years imprisonment with or without fine for those who reveal the identity of victims of sexual abuse in public. The law has been amended subsequently to add more sections of the Indian Penal Code under its purview.

== History and Background ==
The criminal Law Amendment, 1983 was enacted by the Parliament of India as a consequence of Mathura rape case which happened in 1972.

== Text of the Law ==
228A. Disclosure of identity of the victim of certain offences etc.

1. Whoever prints or publishes the name or any matter which may make known the identity of any person against whom an offence under section 376, section 376A, section 376AB, section 376B, section 376C, section 376D, section 376DA and section 376DB is alleged or found to have been committed (hereafter in this section referred to as the victim) shall be punished with imprisonment of either description for a term which may extend to two years and shall also be liable to fine.
2. Nothing in sub-section (1) extends to any printing or publication of the name or any matter which may make known the identity of the victim if such printing or publication is— (a) by or under the order in writing of the officer-in-charge of the police station or the police officer making the investigation into such offence acting in good faith for the purposes of such investigation; or (b) by, or with the authorisation in writing of, the victim; or (c) where the victim is dead or minor or of unsound mind, by, or with the authorisation in writing of, the next of kin of the victim: Provided that no such authorisation shall be given by the next of kin to anybody other than the chairman or the secretary, by whatever name called, of any recognised welfare institution or organisation. Explanation For the purposes of this sub-section, “recognized welfare institution or organisation” means a social welfare institution or organisation recognized in this behalf by the Central or State Government.
3. Whoever prints or publishes any matter in relation to any proceeding before a court with respect to an offence referred to in sub-section (1) without the previous permission of such Court shall be punished with imprisonment of either description for a term which may extend to two years and shall also be liable to fine. Explanation The printing or publication of the judgment of any High Court or the Supreme Court does not amount to an offence within the meaning of this section.

== Comparable section in BNS ==
Provision related to anonymity of victims of sexual crime has been retained in the updated criminal code. The relevant provisions can be found u/s 72(1) of the Bharatiya Nyaya Sanhita.
