= Centre for Women's Development Studies =

Women and gender organisation in India

- Other name: CWDS
- Type: ICSSR-supported Research Institute
- Established: 1980
- Chairperson: Vasanthi Raman
- Director: N. Manimekalai
- Location: 25, Bhai Vir Singh Marg, Gole Market,New Delhi, Delhi, India
- Website: www.cwds.ac.in

The Centre for Women's Development Studies (CWDS) is a women's studies non-governmental organisation based in Delhi, India. It was established in 1980 under the leadership of educationist J. P. Naik, with Vina Mazumdar as its founding Director, Phulrenu Guha as its first Chairperson and Lotika Sarkar as one of its founding members. Its founders were a group of scholars and activists aimed to expand notions of gender research and action across the social sciences. The establishment of the centre was a direct outcome of the experiences of its founders, some of them had been an integral part of the path-breaking Towards Equality (Report of the Committee on the Status of Women in India, 1974) while others had participated in the Indian Council of Social Science Research's introduction of women's studies (1976–80).

The centre is involved in the analysis of trends and issues related to women and gender through its research, action, documentation, training and networking. Its faculty has initiated and facilitated multidisciplinary explorations, found new institutional partners, and shared its research findings with a growing network of scholars and activists.

The CWDS is among the most well-known institutions committed to the theory and practice of women's studies and gender justice in the region. It consists of a faculty with diverse research interests, actively promotes advocacy and policy interventions, and houses a library and documentation centre. Located in the heart of New Delhi, the centre attracts scholars, students, activists, and many others from India and also abroad who draw on its resources.

== Major Activities ==
The major activities of the Centre include: In its formative years, an underlying commitment of the CWDS was to play the role of catalyst, stimulating processes that would work towards the constitutional goals of women's equality and participation in all aspects of national life. The early research projects of the centre – on land rights, women's work, natural resources, the law, and family strategies (to name a few) – as well as its action project in West Bengal have reflected a quest to better understand the forces at play in Indian society from the perspectives of women's lives, especially the most disenfranchised.

Since then, the centre has seen an accretion in its staff as well as in the spread of activities and interests. Some broad research areas of the current faculty include:

- Globalisation, women and work
- Democracy, politics and governance
- The Children's rights of the child
- Law and systems of justice
- Statistics and gender indicators
- Migration and citizenship
- Comparative perspectives on health
- Violence and disability
- Gender and conflict
- Gender and education
- Histories of the women's movement
- Women's studies and feminism

== Action Research ==
From its inception, the centre's intention has been to work for change by going beyond the conventions of pure research and academic neutrality. Action research was a direct outcome of this strategy and came to be most fully realised in the Project in West Bengal. Combining women's grassroots' empowerment with enhanced livelihood skills, the Project empowered marginalised rural women to amplify their voices and that of their communities. These action research projects have demonstrated how grassroots women's organisations – otherwise the most remote from institutions of higher education – can be partners in the production of knowledge about women's lives and struggles.

== Library Services ==
The CWDS library is a specialised resource centre, housing one of the most comprehensive collections of published and unpublished materials relating to women in India. Its vast array of resources includes books, journals, conference documents, newsletters and an extensive corpus of newspaper clippings. The library also provides a range of regular information services, which include the monthly Current Awareness Service Bulletin, the Library Reading List Series, a listing of current contents of periodicals and analytical alert service, which informs users about the contents of edited volumes received by the library. It also prepares thematic bibliographies on various issues.

The CWDS library initiated BOL – an Electronic Discussion List on gender issues in South Asia in January 2000. The library has in the last few years been actively developing its electronic outreach and new forms of digitisation. The library is in the process of building an archive for researchers in women's studies through its website.

== Publications ==
CWDS prioritizes dissemination of its work through diverse channels. Ongoing research work undertaken by the centre is promptly released through its Occasional Papers series and monographs, as well as regular contributions through books, articles and reports. The first women's studies journal – Samya Shakti, was published by CWDS from 1988 to 1994. Subsequently renamed The Indian Journal of Gender Studies, this journal is now published three times a year and distributed by SAGE Publications.

== Photo Archive ==
An increasing appreciation of the role of visual archives in enhancing an understanding of women's changing roles and status in India led to the establishment of a photographic archive on women in the per-independence period. Since its creation, this first national level photographic archive on women for the period 1875-1947 has taken on multiple forms, through a traveling exhibition, a series of calendars and a major book.

== Teaching Women's Studies ==
Faculty of the Centre have been actively if informally contributing through lectures and workshops to developing the teaching, pedagogy and curriculum creation of women's studies in different contexts. In the late 90s, the CWDS initiated the idea of using the UGC refresher course structure to introduce women's studies to college and university teachers, which was subsequently taken up in different parts of the country with considerable success. Short Orientation Courses in Women's Studies have also been offered by the centre, and in 2010 an intensive six-week Research Training Course was offered for students' intent on pursuing doctoral or research work in the field.

The CWDS in collaboration with Ambedkar University Delhi, Delhi started a full-fledged Ph.D. Program in Women's Studies at the centre, which aims to provide a rigorous interdisciplinary methodological grounding and a conducive atmosphere for a new generation of researchers.

== Advocacy and Networking ==
CWDS has been a founding member of various networks including the Indian Association for Women's Studies (IAWS), Forum for Crèche and Child Care Services (FORCES) and the National Network of Women's Organisations based in Delhi. The centre is an institutional member of the Delhi Library Network (DELNET) and INDEV, an electronic network on development information. In association with various networks and organisations, the centre has initiated advocacy on various issues such as the rights of children, reservations for women, the right to food, the rights of forest people, protests against the population policy, questions of legal reform, and so on.

== Financial Support ==
Since 1984, the CWDS has received support from the Indian Council of Social Science Research, under the Ministry of Human Resource Development. It has also been able to carry out its work with financial assistance from numerous other organisations, including HIVOS, the Ford Foundation, the Ministry of Women and Child Development, the International Development Research Centre, Plan India, among others.

CWDS has been home to a range of ideas, debates and perspectives involving persons across generations, ideological positions and institutional locations.
