= Vina Mazumdar =

Indian academic and feminist (1927–2013)

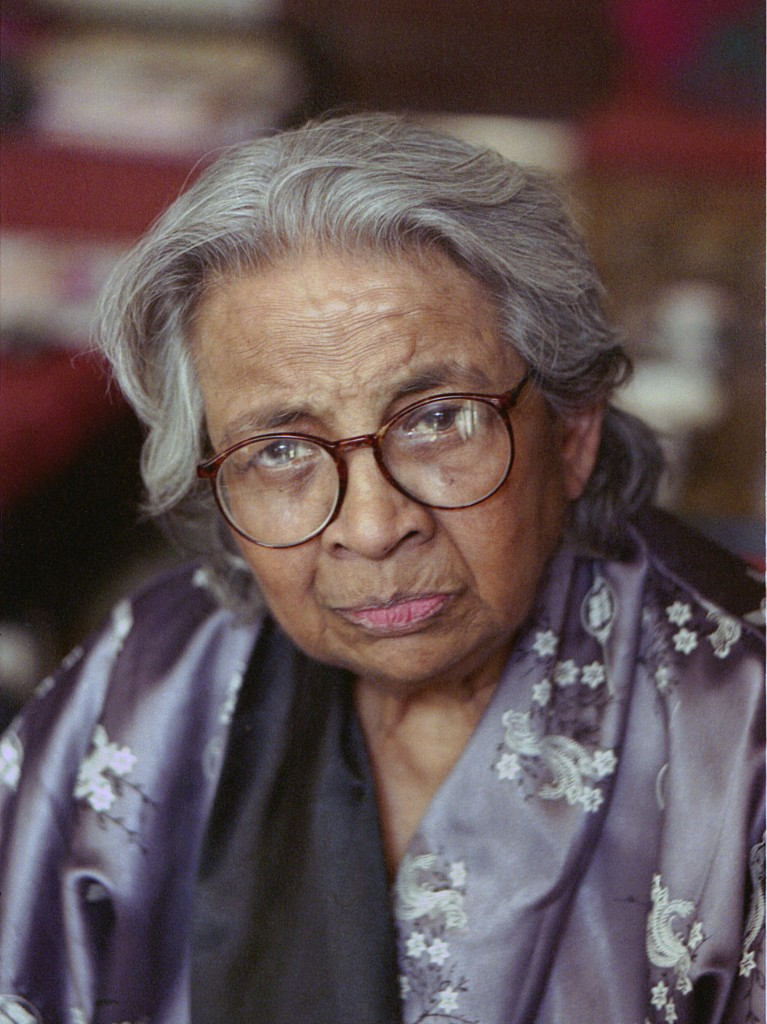
- Vina Mazumdar in 2010
- Born: 28 March 1927; Calcutta, Bengal Presidency, British India
- Died: 30 May 2013 (aged 86); New Delhi, India
- Education: D. Phil.
- Alma mater: Oxford University; Asutosh College
- Occupations: women studies academic and researcher
- Organization(s): Centre for Women's Development Studies, Delhi
- Known for: Towards Equality (1974); Founder-Director Centre for Women's Development Studies (CWDS, 1980-1991)

Dr. Vina Mazumdar (28 March 1927 – 30 May 2013) was an Indian academic, feminist, a pioneer in women's studies in India and a leading figure of the Indian women's movement. She was amongst the first women academics to combine activism with scholarly research in women's studies. She was secretary of the first Committee on the Status of Women in India that brought out the first report on the condition of women in the country, Towards Equality (1974). She was the founding Director of the Centre for Women's Development Studies (CWDS), an autonomous organisation established in 1980, under the Indian Council of Social Science Research (ICSSR). She was a National Research Professor at the Centre for Women's Development Studies, Delhi.

== Early life and education ==
Vina Mazumdar was born in a middle-class Bengali household in Kolkata, the youngest of five children, three boys and two girls. Her father, Prakash Majumdar, was an engineer. His work meant the family moved frequently, giving her family varied exposure to different regions and languages of India. Mazumdar later described her mother as the strongest influence on her upbringing. Her uncle was the noted historian R.C. Majumdar (1888–1980). She did her schooling from St. John's Diocesan Girls' Higher Secondary School, Kolkata, then studied at Women's College, Banaras Hindu University (also known as Mahila Maha Vidyalaya), and subsequently at Asutosh College, the University of Calcutta, where she got involved in student politics, took part in demonstrations during the 1940s and became the secretary of the Ashutosh College Girls Students Union. While at the college, she organised a meeting in support of the Rama Rao Committee, which recommended the expansion of the inheritance rights for daughters through crucial Hindu Law Reform. In 1946, she moved to Delhi and lived with her father while preparing for the Oxford entrance examinations. She later recalled during this period witnessing the Constituent Assembly debates, the midnight transfer-of-power session in August 1947 and, on the following morning, the lowering of the British national flag and the Indian tricolour being raised.

In 1947, just after independence, she went to St Hugh's College, Oxford. Here she initially intended to study history, but a dispute arose over the university's requirement that she study Latin despite having already passed the subject in her entrance examination. In a subsequent compromise, she went on to study Modern Greats. This decision that led to her understanding of the gap between constitutional guarantees of equality and the actual social position of most women. She completed her graduation in 1951. She also served as the secretary of the Oxford Majlis, the association of Indian students. This was when Saiyid Nurul Hasan, her senior, was its president. Years later, he became Minister of Education and Social Welfare and was instrumental in bringing her into CSWI as Member Secretary. She returned to Oxford University in 1960, and received her D.Phil. there in 1962, with her doctoral thesis, Imperial Policy in India, 1905–1910.

== Career ==
She started her career as a lecturer of Political Science in Patna University in 1951, soon becoming the first Secretary of the Patna University Teachers' Association and got involved in teachers' agitation against a Bihar government bill on state's universities. She taught here till 1960, and among her students at the university were future diplomat Muchkund Dubey and politician Yashwant Sinha. In 1960, she returned to Oxford in 1960 to complete her doctoral research. By now, both her parents and mother-in-law had passed away, so due to a lack of usual family support, she took her two young daughters with her to Oxford. Later, she taught at Berhampur University, where she was appointed upon the recommendation of Professor Bidhu Bhusan Das, her friend from Oxford University, who was Director of Public Instruction, Odisha, at the time. Subsequently, she joined the University Grants Commission Secretariat, New Delhi, as an Education Officer. Later, she described working with then Chairman D. S. Kothari as an even more influential learning experience than Oxford, as it exposed her to various aspects of Indian society. Next, she became a Fellow of the Indian Institute of Advanced Studies, Shimla, for the research project, 'University Education and Social Change in India' (April 1970 – Dec. 1970).

She was Member Secretary for the Committee on the Status of Women in India (CSWI, 1971–74). The committee, appointed by the Government of India in 1971, was reconstituted in 1973 with her, a late entrant, as Member Secretary. The report of the committee, Towards Equality, highlighted the rise in poverty amongst women in the transition from agrarian to industrial society, as well as the decline of the sex ratio in India. Eventually, the report became a turning point both for Women's Studies and the women's movement in India. Later Mazumdar became Director, Programme of Women's Studies, Indian Council of Social Science Research from 1975 to 80. Mazumdar helped organise a meeting to support the recommendations of the Rama Rao Committee on Hindu Law Reform to expand the inheritance rights of daughters.

In 1980, she co-founded the Centre for Women's Development Studies (CWDS), New Delhi and remained its founder-Director from 1980 till her retirement in 1991. CWDS initiated the concept of "action-research" as it studied landless tribal peasant women in Jhilimili village in Bankura district and Medinipur of West Bengal at the 'Reorientation Camp for Seasonally Migrant Women Labourers' organised by the Government of West Bengal. It soon became an influential institution which impacted the course of women's studies in India. She later credited her fieldwork with rural women for helping her change her approach to research and view public policy from the perspective of the 'dispossessed'. Through her career, Mazumdar straddled both the scholarship and activism side of women's studies, which she referred as "women's studies movement". She was also a founding-member of the Indian Association for Women's Studies (IAWS), founded 1982. She not only played a key role in its establishment but later served as the General Secretary of its first executive committee (1981-1984) and its president (1998-2000). Thereafter, she was Senior Fellow at CWDS and J. P. Naik National Fellow, ICSSR for two years. From 1996 to 2005, she was the chairperson of the Centre for Women's Development Studies, New Delhi. In 2006, she was appointed a National Research Professor of Social Sciences by the Government of India.

Later she recalled that she had changed seven jobs in fourteen years, prompting her elder sister to describe her as a "rolling stone". This later added to the title of her memoir, Memories of a Rolling Stone published in 2010. It was released by communist politician Brinda Karat in Delhi. Subhashini Ali in her review described it as "as much a handbook for intelligent and effective activism" as an autobiography, while Pamela Philipose described its publication as a "cause for celebration", highlighting Mazumdar's role in shaping India's women's movement and women's studies.

== Personal life ==
She married musician Shankar Mazumdar in 1952, whom she met while working in Patna. Upon her marriage, she changed the spelling of her surname from Majumdar (her maiden name) to Mazumdar (her marital name). The couple had four children - three daughters and a son, all academics. One of her daughters was the first wife of Sitaram Yechuri, leader of Communist Party of India (Marxist). Mazumdar died at a hospital in Delhi on May 30, 2013, after a brief illness at the age of 86, and is survived by her children. Her husband has passed away in 2007.

Although Mazumdar maintained close associations with several left figures throughout her life, she never became a member of a political party. Later, in her memoir, she attributed this decision to her father's advice that an academic should remain unaffiliated with any political party.

== Bibliography ==
- Education & social change: three studies on nineteenth century India. Indian Institute of Advanced Study, 1972.
- Role of rural women in development. University of Sussex. Institute of Development Studies. Allied Publishers, 1978.
- Symbols of power: studies on the political status of women in India. Allied, 1979.
- Women and rural transformation: two studies with Rekha Mehra, Kunjulekshmi Saradamoni. ICSSR. Centre for Women's Development Studies. Pub. Concept, 1983.
- Emergence of the Women's Question in India and the Role of Women's Studies. Centre for Women's Development Studies, 1985.
- Khadi and Village Industries Commission. Centre for Women's Development Studies. 1988.
- Peasant Women Organise for Empowerment: The Bankura Experiment. Centre for Women's Development Studies. 1989.
- Women workers in India: studies in employment and status, with Leela Kasturi, Sulabha Brahme, Renana Jhabvala. ICSSR. Chanakya Publications, 1990. ISBN 978-81-70010-73-9.
- Legislative Measures and Policy Directions for Improving the Lot of Farm Women, with Kumud Sarma, Lotika Sarkar. Indian Council of Agricultural Research.
- Women and Indian nationalism, with Leela Kasturi. Vikas Pub. House, 1994. ISBN 978-81-70010-73-9.
- Changing Terms of Political Discourse: Women's Movement in India, 1970s–1990s, with Indu Agnihotri. Economic and Political Weekly, Vol. XXX No. 29, 4 March 1995
- Political Ideology of the Women's Movement's Engagement with Law. Centre for Women's Development Studies, 2000.
- Face to face with rural women: CWDS' search for new knowledge and an interventionist role. Centre for Women's Development Studies, 2002.
- The Mind and the Medium. Explorations in the Evolution of British Imperial Policy in India. Three Essays Collective. 2010. ISBN 978-81-88789-64-1
- Memories of a Rolling Stone. Zubaan Books. 2010. ISBN 978-81-89884-52-9.

== See also ==
- State feminism
