= Narsimha Dhagamwar =

Narsimha Dhagamwar, also known as D. Narsinh, was a lawyer active in the Indian freedom movement. He specialized in labour relations and labour laws.

== Career ==
In the 1930s, he served as an assistant to J. B. Kripalani.

Later, he also served as the Chief Labour Officer in a mining firm at Dhanbad in 1940s and 1950s.

== Personal life ==
In 1933, he married the famous feminist writer, academician and social activist Geeta Sane. He was the father of Vasudha Dhagamwar, who was also a lawyer, writer and social activist.

His sister, Kamala Dhagamwar, was the mother of Andhra politician D. Sripada Rao. His nephew, Sudhir Dhagamwar, was a national level cricketer from Nagpur, Vidarbha.

Narsimha Dhagamwar's father was Shankar Dhagamwar. Narsimha had three brothers: Dattatreya Dhagamwar, Marutirao Dhagamwar (a journalist at The Hitavada English Daily newspaper in Nagpur), and Sharad Dhagamwar.
