= Towards Equality =

Report on Status of women in India

- Publisher: Ministry of Education and Social Welfare, Government of India
- Country: India
- Language: English

Towards Equality: The Report of the Committee on the Status of Women in India (1974–75) was the title of the report of the Committee on the Status of Women in India (1974–1975). This 1974 document is said to lay the foundation of the women's movement in independent India, highlighting discriminatory sociocultural practices, political and economic processes. The findings of the report reopened the women's question for government, academia and women's organisations. Its authors included Vina Mazumdar and Lotika Sarkar, who later founded the Centre for Women’s Development Studies in Delhi. Other authors were: Phulrenu Guha, Maniben Kara, Savitri Shyam, Neera Dogra, Vikram Mahajan, Leela Dube, Sakina A. Hasan, and Urmila Haksar. Mazumdar joined the Committee on 15 April 1972, replacing educationist Mina Swaminathan as a member, and later when the committee was reconstituted in September 1973, she was appointed its Member-Secretary.

== Overview ==
When the UN declared 1975 International Women's Year, it required member states to submit Country Reports on the status of women in their countries. Subsequently, bureaucrat J.B. Naik was instrumental in getting the group together. During the preparation of the report, Mazumdar and Lotika Sarkar jointly submitted a 'note of dissent' after the committee rejected reservations for women in state legislatures and Parliament. Although both had previously opposed special representation, the evidence gathered during the inquiry and consultation with political scientists involved in the ground level research lead to the understanding about the declining presence of women in political institutions. This led them to support reservations at higher legislative levels.

== Significance ==
It was the first comprehensive document to examine the condition of women in post-independence India and served as a foundational text for the study of women's status in the country. The report proved to be an "eye-opener" for women's condition by talking about development and democracy from gender perspective. It brought to the forefront the issues of declining sex ratio (missing women). It led to women-sensitive policy-making in India and stress on girls' education.

== See also ==
- Feminism in India
- Centre for Women's Development Studies
- Women in India
