= Krishna Kumar (educationist) =

Indian academic

Krishna Kumar is an Indian intellectual and academician, noted for his writings on the sociology and history of education. He is currently an Honorary Professor in Panjab University, Chandigarh, India. His academic work involves a wide range of themes, including the school curriculum as a means of social inquiry, gender, peace education, and the role of language during childhood among others. His work is notable for its critical engagement with modernity in a once colonized society and post welfare discourses in education. As a teacher and bilingual writer, he has developed an aesthetic of pedagogy and knowledge that aspires to mitigate aggression and violence and to encourage introspection. In addition to his academic work, he writes fiction and non-fiction in Hindi. His latest book in English, Thank You, Gandhi, is a blend of fiction and non-fiction. He also writes for children. He taught at the Central Institute of Education, University of Delhi, from 1981 to 2016 where he served as the Dean and Head of the institution. From 2004 to 2010, he was Director of the National Council of Educational Research and Training (NCERT), an apex organization for curricular decision making and educational research in India. He was awarded the Padma Shri by the President of India in 2011. The Institute of Education (IoE), University of London, awarded him an Honorary D.Litt. in Education in the same year.

== Early life ==
Born in Allahabad, Uttar Pradesh, in 1951, Krishna Kumar grew up in Tikamgarh, a district town in Madhya Pradesh (MP) where he went to school and college. He completed his higher education at the University of Saugar, Madhya Pradesh and the University of Toronto where he attained Ph.D. in educational theory.

== Career ==
Prof. Krishna Kumar started his teaching career at Kirori Mal College of Delhi University in 1971.His early writings on education appeared in the Hindi weekly Dinman during the editorship of Hindi poet Raghuvir Sahay. Prof. Kumar joined the Central Institute of Education, Delhi University, in 1981 where he served till 2016. He has been a National Lecturer of the University Grants Commission, a Fellow of the Nehru Memorial Museum and Library, a visiting fellow at the Centre for Modern Oriental Studies, Berlin, the Centre for the Advanced Study of India, University of Pennsylvania, and an Erasmus Mundus Fellow at the Institute of Education, University of London. He has delivered several memorial lectures, including the Gladwyn lecture in the House of Lords. He was awarded the Jawaharlal Nehru Fellowship to examine the history textbooks of India and Pakistan.

From 2004 to 2010, Prof Kumar served as the Director of National Council for Educational Research and Training (NCERT), Delhi. The National Curricular Framework (2005), one of the most progressive documents pertaining to school education, was prepared under his leadership along with 21 position papers on key issues on Education. This was followed by the development of NCERT textbooks from Grades I to XII through an unprecedented collaboration between large number of academicians, field practitioners, schoolteachers, teacher educators, journalists, activists, and researchers. He introduced a model of Textbook Development Committee for every subject and at every level of school. He pioneered several organizational structures during his tenure such as setting up a Reading Cell, to focus on issues of early literacy in Indian classrooms and developing a series of English textbooks for rural children.

== Publications ==
Books in English:

- Social Character of Learning (Sage, 1989).
- Political Agenda of Education (Sage, 1991).
- What is Worth Teaching (Orient Longman, 1992; revised edition in 2024).
- Learning from Conflict (Orient Longman, 1996).
- The Child’s Language and the Teacher (National Book Trust, 2000). Translated into Hindi, Maithili, Marathi, Tamil, Telugu, Tibetan and Kannada).
- Prejudice and Pride (Viking/Penguin, 2001). Translated into Hindi and published by Rajkamal Publications as Mera Desh Tumhara Desh.
- Battle for Peace (Penguin, 2007). Translated into Hindi and published by Rajkamal as Shanti Ka Samar.
- A Pedagogue’s Romance: Reflections on Schooling (Oxford University Press, 2008).
- Politics of Education in Colonial India (Routledge, 2014)
- Education, Conflict and Peace (Orient Blackswan, 2016).
- Can History Contribute to Peace? (History for Peace, 2023)
- Thank You, Gandhi (Penguin/Viking, 2024)

Edited volumes:

- Sociological Perspectives on Education (co-editor S. Shukla; Chanakya, 1984).
- Democracy and Education in India (Radiant and Nehru Memorial Museum and Library, 1990).
- Social Change and Education in South Asia (co-editor, Joachim Oesterheld; Orient Longman, 2007).
- Constructing Modern Asian Citizenship (co-editor, Edward Vickers; Routledge, 2015).
- Routledge Handbook of Education in India (2017).
- Rethinking Schooling (Report on curriculum policies in 21 Asian countries, drafted by a committee chaired by Krishna Kumar), MGIEP UNESCO, New Delhi, 2017.

Perspective Paper:

- Can Education Contribute to Peace? (MGIEP UNESCO, New Delhi, 2018)

Books in Hindi:

- Neelee Ankhon Wale Bagule (short story collection; Shabdakar, 1976).
- Raj, Samaj aur Shiksha (Rajkamal: 1991).
- Abdul Majeed ka chhura (travel essays; Kitabghar, 1995).
- Vichar ka Dar (Essays; Rajkamal, 1996).
- School ki Hindi (‘School’s Hindi’; Rajkamal, 1998).
- Shiksha aur Gyan (‘Education and Knowledge; Granthshilpi, 1999)
- Raghuvir Sahay Sanchayita (Reader) (Edited; Rajkamal and Mahatma Gandhi International Hindi University, 2000).
- Deevar ka Istemal (Eklavya, 2008).
- Sapnon ka Perh (Rajkamal, 2008).
- Choori Bazaar Mein Ladki (Rajkamal, 2013).
- Kaathgodaam (Rajkamal, 2018).
- Parhna Zara Sochna (Ektara, 2019).
- Bhasha Kii Sanjeevnee (Rajkamal, 2025)

Books for children:

- Mehke Saaree Galee Galee with Nirankar Dev Sevak (National Book Trust)
- Princess Pramila (Orient Longman)
- Aaj Nahi Padhunga (Rajkamal)
- Pooriyon ki Gathari (NBT, 2016)

He has contributed to numerous research journals in India and other countries. He contributes frequently to Economic and Political Weekly, Indian Express and Hindustan Times.
