= LABIA =

Organization for queer and transgender people in Mumbai, India

- Formation: 1995; 31 years ago
- Location: Mumbai
- Formerly called: Stree Sangam

LABIA is an organization for queer and transgender people in Mumbai, India. It was founded in 1995 as Stree Sangam (transl. Women's Association), and is often cited as a significant organization in the history of LGBTQ organizing in India.

According to The Hindu:

"When they started out, the name Stree Sangam was chosen because it seemed generic and sanitised, and wouldn't call attention to itself on mailers that were the mode of communication then. ... Circa 2002, this dichotomy was laid to rest, when the group christened themselves LABIA (Lesbians and Bisexuals in Action), and were unequivocal about welcoming trans people. The explicit reference to female genitalia was deliberate and combative, as the group increasingly saw themselves as public campaigners, than just enablers of screenings and soirées for closeted lesbians."

Jaya Sharma and Dipika Nath describe LABIA as among the wave of "explicitly political activist groups…whose political activism combines with their role as resource organizations." An important tenet of LABIA's politics has been inter-sectionality — the idea that all systems of oppression are interlinked in many overlapping ways, which struggles for parity on any turf must take into account.

LABIA's activities have involved networking with individual queer women and queer groups in India and in other countries, campaigning for the rights of peoples and communities of marginalized genders and sexualities and organizing feminist and people's movements jointly with the struggles of other marginalized groups. LABIA intends to further this activism and sees Scripts (see below) as a vibrant space for multiple conversations of queer/feminist/activist/creative voices.

== Etymology ==
The organization's name was initially an acronym for Lesbians and Bisexuals in Action which also spelled Labia, part of what makes up the vulva, the visible parts of cisgender women's genitals.

== Breaking the Binary: a LABIA research study ==
In 2009, LABIA began a research study that attempted to understand more about gender through the lives of queer persons assigned gender female at birth. They travelled across the country to several cities to meet LBT groups and individuals from both urban and rural areas for interviews and group discussions.

In 2013, they published the report titled Breaking The Binary: Understanding concerns and realities of queer persons assigned gender female at birth across a spectrum of lived gender identities. The key findings of the report were shared in public meetings in six cities around the country. They also translated and published the report in Hindi in 2014. In July 2015, Zubaan published a book based on this study titled No Outlaws in the Gender Galaxy, which is available in bookstores and online. The full reports are available for free in both English and Hindi.

== Scripts and Other Support Activities ==
LABIA also publishes a magazine called Scripts, established in 1998, and published at least once per year. LABIA's website describes it as "a vibrant space for multiple conversations of queer/feminist/activist/creative voices." According to The Hindu, "This small, unassuming journal has been one of the beacons of creative expression for queer female voices since 1998. The very first issue featured a hand-drawn cover with a full hand of three striking women from a deck of playing cards. The invitation-only events on 19th and 20th December are restricted to activists, who are expected to gather from cities across India."

Another writer described Scripts as: "includ[ing] a variety of writing from the lesbian, bisexual, and transgender communities, primarily in English but sometimes including other languages. The focus is varied, with special editions dedicated to politics, censorship, humour, travel. Much of the writing is experiment, or of the sort that may not be readily published [elsewhere]."

According to LiveMint,

"In Scripts, one found not only writing by queer-identified individuals, but also a set of clearly queer graphics, illustrations and short comics, done by members of the LBT (lesbian, bisexual and transgender) community. In these visual pieces, one found drawings of non-mainstream, non-heteronormative women who were clearly Indian, something that wasn't easily seen at the time. One particular Scripts zine was the Hair issue (July 2006), whose cover featured illustrations of a range of butch and femme Indian lesbians and their hairstyles..."

In addition, LABIA phone line operates for LBT people to connect, talk about their concerns, and start the process of breaking out of the isolation that being queer often entails. CineLabia are monthly film screenings held by LABIA to create a social space to chill out, watch, and discuss queer and feminist films from across the world.

== See also ==
- Timeline of South Asian and diasporic LGBT history
