= D. Sripada Rao =

Indian politician

Speaker of Andhra Pradesh Legislative Assembly
- In office 19 Aug 1991 – 11 Jan 1995
- Preceded by: P. Ramachandra Reddy
- Succeeded by: Yanamala Ramakrishnudu

Personal details
- Born: 2 March 1935 Dhanwada, Jayashankar Bhupalpally district
- Died: 13 April 1999 (aged 64) Mahadevpur, Karimnagar District, Telangana, India
- Party: Indian National Congress
- Children: 6

Duddilla Sripada Rao (2 March 1935 – 13 April 1999) was an Indian politician and was a member of the Andhra Pradesh Legislative Assembly representing the Indian National Congress.

== Family ==
His mother's maiden name was Kamala Dhagamwar, who was the daughter of Shankar Dhagamwar.

She had 4 brothers -:

1) Narsimha Dhagamwar - husband of Geeta Sane.

2) Dattatreya Dhagamwar.

3) Marutirao Dhagamwar.

4) Sharad Dhagamwar.

Duddilla Sripada Rao had six children. Out of which fourth is Duddilla Sridhar Babu.

== Death ==
D. Sripada Rao was shot dead by Naxalites of the People's War Group near Annaram village in Karimnagar district on 13 April 1999.
