= Vibhuti Patel =

- Born: 18 June 1955 (age 71); Vadodara
- Occupations: Academic, writer, political activist and feminist
- Title: Professor

Academic background
- Education: B.A., M.A., Ph.D., Post Doctorate in Economics , BS; MS; PhD
- Alma mater: M.S. University; University of Mumbai
- Thesis: Under utilisation of Labour Power in India (1988)

Academic work
- Institutions: SNDT Women's University and Tata Institute of Social Sciences

Vibhuti Patel (born 18 June 1955) is an Indian academic, writer, political activist and feminist.

== Education ==
Patel was born in Vadodara in a middle-class family of Patidar community. Her parents wanted her to study medicine but she declined after writing the medical entrance exam and joined arts to pursue economics and to understand Marxian economics better. She completed her graduation in 1975 and post-graduation in 1977 from M. S. University, Vadodara, Gujarat. She did her Ph.D. on 'Underutilisation of Labour power in India' in 1987 from the Department of Economics, University of Mumbai.

== Career ==
Patel is a professor and head, of the Department of Economics at SNDT Women's University, Mumbai. She also worked at Tata Institute of Social Sciences, Mumbai.

She started her academic career as a reader from 1988 to 1993 at the Research Centre for Women's Studies (RCWS), SNDT Women's University, Juhu Campus, Mumbai, and also taught women's studies to M.Phil. students in the P.G. Department of Teaching and Research in Economics and supervised theses of M.Phil. and PhD students. During 1993–94, she was a visiting faculty at the Centre for Social Studies, Surat, where she prepared a monograph on "Social Construction of Paid and Unpaid Work of Gujarati Women in Bombay Presidency (1880-1930)." Then, after being a consultant at the Ministry of Youth Affairs, Government of India, Delhi in connection with Perspective Plan for Indian Youth 1995, she taught M.A. Economics for distance education students at the PG Department of Economics, SNDT Women's University, Mumbai from 1994 to 2002. From 2002 to 2004, she was the reader at the Department of Economics, University of Mumbai. Later, she returned to SNDT Women's University and was the director at the Department of Post-Graduate Studies and Research till 2012. From 2011 to 2015, she was an ad hoc member of the Board of Studies, Women's Studies and Development under the Faculty of Social Sciences, R.T. M. Nagpur University, Nagpur.

Earlier in 2011, she was also on the Technical Advisory Group of UNFPA for the project "Enhancing male participation for improving gender equality in Maharashtra" and on the expert committee (EC) for Mission on Science and Technology for Women, Ministry of Science and Technology, Government of India, Delhi.

She authored several books and wrote many chapters in academic textbooks. 'Gendered Inequalities in Paid and Unpaid Work of Women in India,' co-authored with Nandita Mondal, Women's Challenges of the New Millennium and An Intersectional Gendered Discourse on Empowerment During Pre and Post COVID-19 Pandemic are well received.
