= Lotika Sarkar =

Indian feminist, educator and lawyer

- Born: 4 January 1923
- Died: 23 February 2013 (aged 90); New Delhi, India
- Education: Cambridge University
- Occupations: feminist, educator and lawyer
- Organization(s): Delhi University; Indian Law Institute
- Known for: Towards Equality (1974)

Lotika Sarkar (4 January 1923 – 23 February 2013) was a noted Indian feminist, social worker, educator and lawyer, who was a pioneer in the field of women's studies and women's rights in India. She was a founding member of Centre for Women's Development Studies (CWDS), Delhi, established in 1980, and also Indian Association for Women Studies, established in 1982. Starting in 1951, she taught law at Faculty of Law, University of Delhi till 1983, and also remained the head of the law faculty; thereafter she taught at Indian Law Institute. She was the first Indian woman to graduate from Cambridge University, and later in 1951 she also became the first woman to receive a PhD degree in law from the university.

== Early life and education ==
Born in 1923, she was raised in an aristocratic family in West Bengal, where her father Sir Dhiren Mitra was leading lawyer of India.

Sarkar studied law at Newnham College, Cambridge and became the first Indian woman to study and also then graduate from the university. Later she wrote a PhD in Law, also at Cambridge University, awarded in 1951. Thereafter in 1960, she studied international law at the Harvard University, where she was one of four Indian students, returning to India in 1961.

== Career ==
In 1953, when Sarkar started teaching at the law faculty, University of Delhi, she was the first female lecturer in the faculty. Law was still a new field for women, initially there were only 10 girls in the course, a number which grew to 80–100 by the 1960s . She taught here till 1983, teaching eminent jurist and lawyers, and finally became the Head of the law faculty, and also the university don.

In 1971, she became a member of the Committee on the Status of Women in India (CSWI), where along with her colleague, Vina Mazumdar, who joined in 1973 as Member-Secretary, there went on to publish the seminal, Towards Equality: The Report of the Committee on the Status of Women in India (1974–75) In 1979, the Supreme Court of India reversed the judgment of Bombay High Court in the Mathura rape case, in which two policemen were sentenced for raping of sixteen-year-old girl within a police station. The acquittal, went largely unnoticed until September 1979, when professors Upendra Baxi, Raghunath Kelkar and Sarkar of Delhi University and Vasudha Dhagamwar of Pune, wrote an open letter to the Supreme Court, protesting the concept of consent in the judgment. "Consent involves submission, but the converse is not necessarily true...From the facts of case, all that is established is submission, and not consent...Is the taboo against pre-marital sex so strong as to provide a license to Indian police to rape young girls." Later in January 1980 she formed the first feminist group against rape, "Forum Against Rape", widespread protests followed and eventually Indian Penal Code was amended.

In 1980, she became a founder member of Centre for Women's Development Studies (CWDS), Delhi, founded by Vina Mazumdar, and which went on to become an influential institution, impacting the course of women's studies in India. Through the 1980s and 90s, she taught criminal law at the Indian Law Institute in Delhi. She was also a founding member of Indian Association for Women's Studies, established in 1982.

== Personal life ==
She met Chanchal Sarkar in 1951, while he too was studying at Cambridge, they married in 1957. Chanchal Sarkar went on to become an eminent journalist, assistant editor of The Statesman and founding director of the Press Institute of India in 1963; he died on 10 October 2005 in Delhi. The couple had no children.

She continued to live thereafter at their Hauz Khas, Delhi residence, which she was disposed of January 2009 by the tenants, which led to a media furore Several leading intellectuals, jurists, academics, journalists, activists and over a dozen national groups and institutions came forward in her support demanding speedy justice, some even met the President, before the house was restored to her by the courts in November 2009.

She died in New Delhi on 23 February 2013, at the age of 90.

== Bibliography ==
- New Perspectives for Third World Women (The E. V. Mathew memorial lectures), with Brigalia H. Bam. Christian Institute for the Study of Religion and Society, 1979.
- National Policies and Legal Reform: Impact on Women, Indian Council of Social Science Research, Programme of Women's Studies, 1980.
- Constitutional Guarantees: The Unequal Sex Centre for Women's Development Studies, 1986.
- National Specialised Agencies and Women's Equality: Law Commission of India. Centre for Women's Development Studies, 1988.
- Legislative Measures and Policy Directions for Improving the Lot of Farm Women, with Vina Mazumdar, Kumud Sarma. Indian Council of Agricultural Research.
- Handbook on Women and Law, Vol. 1. Legal Literacy Project, Department of Adult Continuing Education and Extension, University of Delhi, 1990.
- Women's Movement and the Legal Process, Centre for Women's Development Studies, 1995.
- Engendering Law: Essays in Honour of Lotika Sarkar, ed. Amita Dhanda, Archana Parashar. Eastern Book Company, 2005. ISBN 8170129540.
