= Sheri Markose =

British economist

- Education: London School of Economics, Jawaharlal Nehru University
- Occupation: Professor of Economics
- Employer: University of Essex
- Known for: Multi-Agent Financial Network Models; Gödel Logic of How Digital Agents Innovate

Sheri Marina Markose is a computational economist and a professor of economics at the University of Essex, where she has held a personal chair since 2006. She is the founding director (2002-2009) of the Centre for Computational Finance and Economic Agents (CCFEA) at Essex. At CCFEA, with the support of the then Vice Chancellor, Ivor Crewe, she pioneered multi-disciplinary research as well as PhD and Masters programs, which include Agent-based computational economics, digital economy market micro structure, financial market modelling with extreme events and markets as complex adaptive systems.

== Research and policy advisory ==
=== Data driven multi-agent financial and macro-net models ===
In the aftermath of the Great Financial Crisis, which marked the failure of conventional macroeconomic models, Markose's work on financial network analysis for Systemic Risk, led to her 2011 IMF project on Systemic risk from global derivatives market.

In 2013, Markose was appointed as an academic advisor to the G20 OTC Derivatives Coordination Group of the Basel Committee on Banking Supervision and Financial Stability Board for the Macroeconomic Impact Assessment of OTC Derivatives Regulatory Reforms (MAGD). From 2011 to 2014, Markose was a Senior Consultant at the Financial Stability Unit of the Reserve Bank of India where she oversaw the digital mapping of the Indian financial system for systemic risk management

At the 2014 event at the London School of Economics on Towards A Sustainable Financial System, Markose has argued for why we need new models of the economy.

In the 2017 Banque de France Financial Stability Review, Markose and co-authors mooted a quantifiable measure of skin-in-the-game capital levies on Central Clearing Platforms in the post G20 OTC reforms framework. Markose was awarded the 2017 Eubank Prize by the Rice University, United States, "For integrative synthesis and data driven leadership toward understanding systemic risk in global financial markets".

=== Cashlessness and digital money ===
Markose work on technology innovations in e-money, which started with Electronic fund transfer at Point of sale, shows that the cash-card substitution led to a slowdown in the growth of monetary base with a reduction in the transactions demand for cash in retail expenditures. Due to her expertise in digital payments and cashlessness, in 2024, Markose was appointed to the Central Bank Digital Currency Academic Advisory Group of the Bank of England.

=== Complex adaptive systems and Game theory: Gödel's incompleteness theorems and Novelty Production ===
Markose foundational work on software based digital systems bridges the gaps between complex adaptive systems capable of producing novelty and surprises, Game Theory and Gödel's Incompleteness Theorems. She cites the influence on her thinking by the LSE game theorist Kenneth Binmore who had alerted her of the pitfalls of playing predictable strategies due to ‘Gödel’s Liar’, viz the adversarial digital agent who will negate what it can predict/compute qua virus or hacker. In 2017 Markose shows that the Nash equilibrium of the game with Godel’s Liar is an arms race in surprises or novelty production which is missing in extant Game Theory. The parallels with the Lucas critique on Surprise outcomes and Goodhart’s law and implications for policy design especially in the digital economy have been noted by Markose

In her 2019 Keynote Talk she gives evidence for Gödelization of biology and on how the capacity to ‘think outside the box’ and innovate evolved first in the Adaptive Immune System and latterly with the mirror neurons in the primate brain resulting in uber protean and Machiavellian intelligence in humans. The ingredients of Gödelization are three-fold Self Reference in the form of Diagonal/ Self Assembly, Self-Representation or offline Mirror mappings of online halting self-assembly machines and a fixed point with the Negator (Godel’s Liar), which is called the Godel Sentence. Markose claims the latter allows a bioltic element to self report it is under attack and in the new currency, the latter is a hashing algorithm in a self-referential blockchain.

In 2025 Markose has joined forces with leading computer and neuroscientists Karl Friston, Georg Northoff , Tony Prescott and Emily Cross to produce a Special Topic and E-book on the role of Self- Reference in biological general intelligence which they argue is geared toward securing the homeostatis of life itself and how this contrasts with AI and AGI.
