= Mathura rape case =

1972 custodial rape case in India

The Mathura rape case was an incident of custodial rape in India on 26 March 1972, wherein Mathura, a young tribal girl, was raped by two policemen on the compound of Desaiganj Police Station in Gadchiroli district of Maharashtra. After the Supreme Court acquitted the accused, there was public outcry and protests, which eventually led to amendments in the Indian rape law via The Criminal Law Amendment Act 1983 (No. 43). In 2025, the then Chief Justice of India B R Gavai called the apex court's verdict a "moment of institutional embarrassment" for misunderstanding the role of power, coercion and patriarchy in sexual violence.

== The incident ==
Mathura was a young orphan tribal girl was living with one of her two brothers. She was an Adivasi. The incident is suspected to have taken place on 26 March 1972, she was between 14 and 16 years old at that time. Mathura occasionally worked as a domestic helper with a woman named Noshi. She met Noshi's nephew named Ashok who wanted to marry her, but her brother did not agree to the union and went to the local police station to lodge a complaint claiming that his sister, a minor, was being kidnapped by Ashok and his family members. After receiving the complaint, the police authority brought Ashok and his family members to the police station. Following general investigation, Mathura, her brother, Ashok, and his family members were permitted to go back home. However, as they were leaving, Mathura was asked to stay behind while her relatives were asked to wait outside. Mathura was then raped by the two policemen.

When her relatives and the assembled crowd threatened to burn down the police chowky, the two accused policemen, Ganpat and Tukaram, reluctantly agreed to file a panchnama (legal recording of evidence).

== The case ==
The case came for hearing on 1 June 1974 in the sessions court. The judgment returned found the defendants not guilty. It was stated that because Mathura was 'habituated to sexual intercourse', her consent was voluntary; under the circumstances only sexual intercourse could be proved and not rape.

On appeal, the Nagpur bench of the Bombay High Court set aside the judgment of the Sessions Court, and sentenced the accused to one and five years imprisonment respectively. The Court held that passive submission due to fear induced by serious threats could not be construed as consent or willing sexual intercourse.

However, in September 1979 the Supreme Court of India justices Jaswant Singh, Kailasam and Koshal in their judgement on Tukaram v. State of Maharashtra reversed the High Court ruling and acquitted the accused policemen. The Supreme Court held that Mathura had raised no alarm; and also that there were no visible marks of injury on her body thereby suggesting no struggle and therefore no rape. The judge noted, "Because she was used to sex, she might have incited the cops (they were drunk on duty) to have intercourse with her".

== Aftermath ==
In September 1979, only a few days after the verdict was pronounced, law professors Upendra Baxi, Raghunath Kelkar and Lotika Sarkar of Delhi University and Vasudha Dhagamwar of Pune wrote an open letter to the Supreme Court, protesting the concept of consent in the judgment. "Consent involves submission, but the converse is not necessarily true...From the facts of case, all that is established is submission, and not consent...Is the taboo against pre-marital sex so strong as to provide a license to Indian police to rape young girls." Spontaneous widespread protests and demonstrations followed by women's organisations who demanded a review of judgement, receiving extensive media coverage.

A number of women's group were formed as a direct response to the judgment, including Saheli in Delhi, and prior to that in January 1980, Lotika Sarkar, was also involved in the formation of the first feminist group in India against rape, "Forum Against Rape", later renamed "Forum Against Oppression of Women" (FAOW). A national conference was organised by FAOW which started the debate for legal reforms. Issues of violence against women and the difficulty of seeking judicial help in sexual crimes was highlighted by the women's movement.

Following the same tradition, on the International Women's day women from various states including Delhi, Mumbai, Hyderabad and Nagpur took to the streets. Seema Sakhare, the founder of the first organizations in India that worked on the issue of violence against women, met and supported Mathura. However, the courts ruled that there was no locus standi (legal standing) in the case to rule in favour to Mathura. Eventually this led to Government of India amending the rape law.

== Legal reform ==
The Criminal Law Amendment Act 1983 (No. 43) made a statutory provision in the face of Section 114A of the Evidence Act made 25 December 1983, which states that if the victim says that she did not consent to the sexual intercourse, the Court shall presume that she did not consent as a rebuttable presumption. New laws were also enacted following the incident. The Section 376 (punishment for rape) of the Indian Penal Code underwent a change with the enactment and addition of section 376A to 376D which made custodial rape punishable. Besides defining custodial rape, the amendment shifted the burden of proof from the accuser to the accused once intercourse was established; it also added provisions for in-camera trials, the prohibition on the victim identity disclosure, and tougher sentences.

== Legacy ==
The case is seen as turning point in women right's movement in India, as it led to just greater awareness of women's legal rights issue, oppression, and patriarchal mindsets. A number of women's organisations soon came forth across India. Previously, rape misjudgments or acquittals would go unnoticed, but in the following years, women's movement against rape gathered force and organisation supporting rape victims and women's rights advocates came to the fore. The criminal law amendment Act 1983 was enacted as a consequence of this case. Section 228A of the Indian Penal Code for example was enacted because of this incident.

== See also ==
- Rape in India
- Anti-rape movement

== Bibliography ==
- Mala Khullar; Ihwa Yŏja Taehakkyo (2005). Writing the Women's Movement: A Reader. Zubaan. ISBN 81-86706-99-2.
- Sarah Gamble, ed. (2001). The Routledge Companion to Feminism and Postfeminism. Routledge. ISBN 0-415-24310-6.
- Charles R. Epp (1998). The Rights Revolution: Lawyers, Activists, and Supreme Courts in Comparative Perspective. University of Chicago Press. p. 105. ISBN 0-226-21162-2.
- Kamlesh Jain (2008). In Case of Rape. Rajkamal Prakashan. ISBN 978-81-8361-194-7.
