= Indian Law Institute =

Law institute in New Delhi, India

Coordinates: 28°35′59″N 77°14′19″E

The Indian Law Institute
- Motto: तमसो मा ज्योतिर्गमय (Sanskrit)
- Motto in English: Let light emerge from darkness
- Type: Deemed University
- Established: 1956; 70 years ago
- Affiliations: BCI, UGC, NAAC
- President: Chief Justice of India
- Director: Prof. Dr. V. K. Ahuja http://www.ili.ac.in/details.php?catid=18
- Students: 366
- Postgraduates: 340
- Doctoral students: 26
- Location: Opp. Supreme Court of India, Bhagwan Das Road New Delhi, India
- Campus: Urban
- Website: ili.ac.in

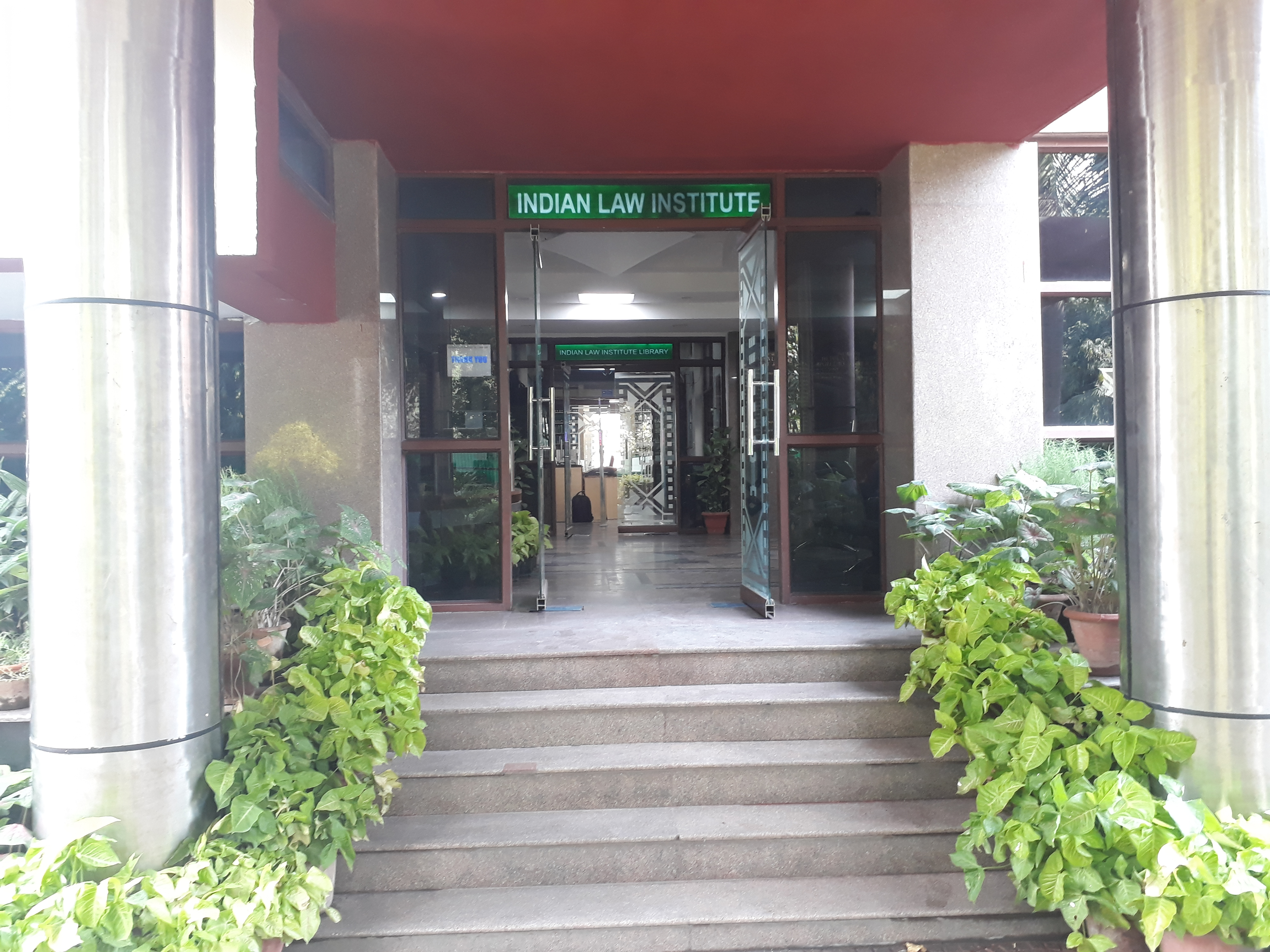
Entrance of Indian Law Institute

The Indian Law Institute (ILI) is a deemed university and socio-legal research institute, founded in 1956. Established in New Delhi, primarily with the objective of promoting and conducting legal research, education and training. The objectives of the Institute as laid down in its Memorandum of Association are to cultivate the science of law, to promote advanced studies and research in law so as to meet the social, economic and other needs of the Indian people, to promote systematization of law, to encourage and conduct investigations in legal and allied fields, to improve legal education, to impart instructions in law, and to publish studies, books, periodicals, etc.

The institute was instrumental in organizing an international conference on Global Environment and Disaster Management Law Society in 2011.

== History ==
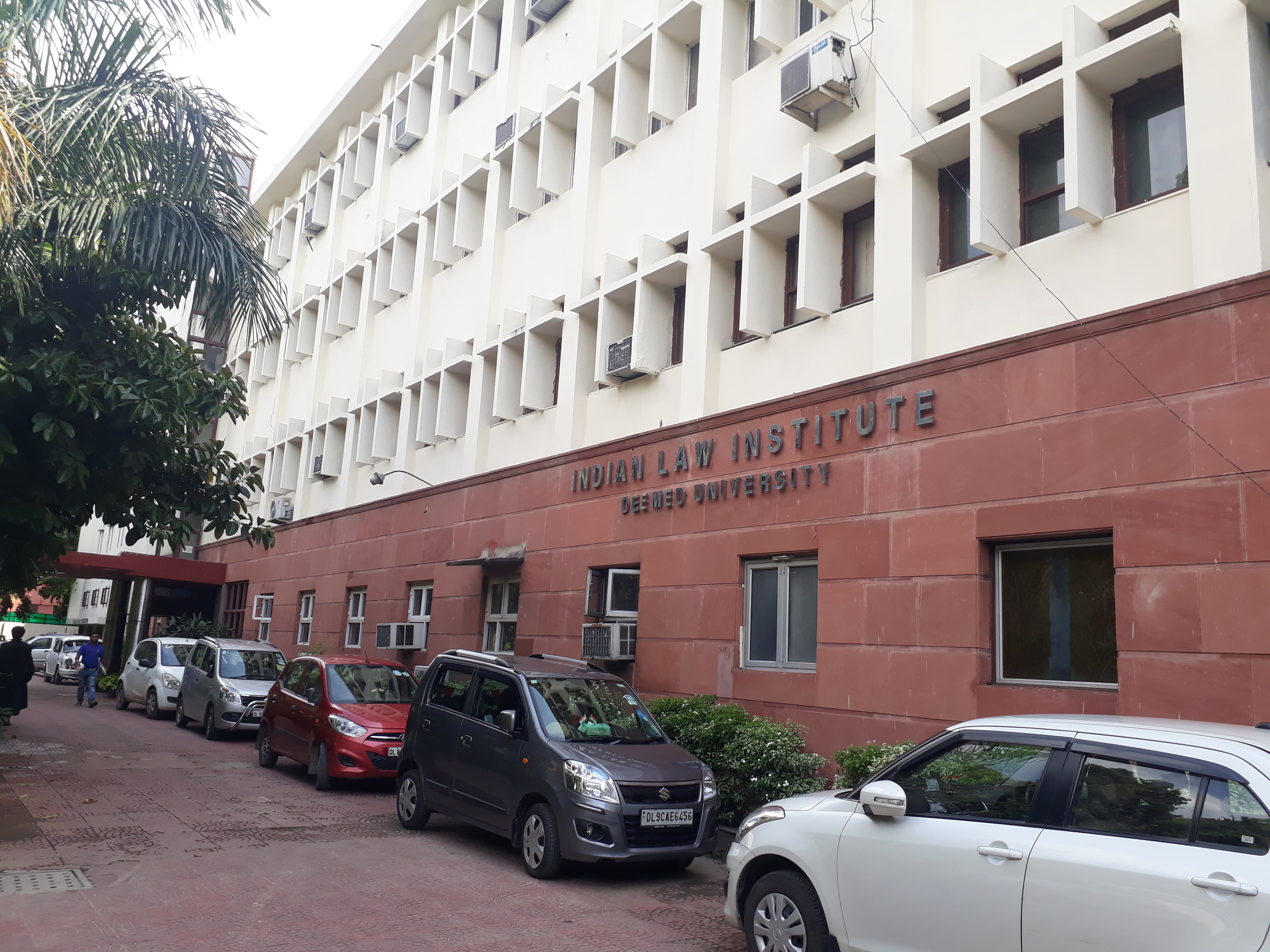
Indian Law Institute campus

It was formally inaugurated by the President of India, Rajendra Prasad on 12 December 1957. A.T. Markose was the founding director of the institute from 1957 to 1963. The institute is an autonomous body registered under the Societies Registration Act, 1860, the Indian Law Institute has the requisite independence and academic freedom to carry out its objectives. The membership of the institute is now nearly three thousand representing the persons interested in the study and advancement of law.

== Organisation and administration ==
=== Governance ===
Hon’ble Chief Justice of India is the ex officio president of the institute. The Law Minister of the government of India and the attorney-general for India are its ex officio vice presidents. A third vice-president is elected by the members of the governing council, from among themselves. Judges of the Hon’ble Supreme Court of India and High Courts, prominent lawyers, government officials and professors of law are represented in the governing council of the institute.

Dharmendra Singh Sengar, was director from July 2009–August 2011. In 2013 Manoj Kumar Sinha was appointed director.

== Academics ==
The institute has been granted deemed university status in 2004 vide the government of India, Ministry of Human Resource Development Notification No. F.9-9/2001-U.3 dated 29.10.2004. After that in 2005, the institute enrolled its first batch of L.L.M. and Ph.D. program, and later also started research based courses.

=== Rankings ===
University rankings

Law – India
- NIRF (2023): 17
- NIRF (2024): 35

The institute was ranked 17th in India in the National Institutional Ranking Framework law ranking in 2023.

=== Library ===
The institute's library has more than 75000 titles and subscribes to 270 current legal periodicals. JILI is the law journal published by the institute. ASIL contains surveys of leading reported court cases in India in a year and same are analysed by academics and practitioners.

=== Publications ===
ILI publishes various books and two Journals. JILI(Journal of the Indian law Institute) is an international journal for academics, researchers, advocates, judges etc. This is edited by Dr Jyoti Dogra Sood, Assistant Research Professor. It has another journal ILI Law review which is an online law journal specially for law students, though academics, researchers, advocates, and judges may also contribute. This is edited by Dr Anurag Deep, Professor of law, ILI.

==== Annual Survey of Indian Law ====
The Annual Survey of Indian Law (ISSN 0570-2666; Annu. Surv. Indian Law) is a law journal published by the institute. It was established in 1965 and the editor-in-chief is Manoj Kumar Sinha.

=== Courses offered ===
Degree Courses

- Ph.D. in Law
- LL.M. - 1-year course

P.G. Diploma Courses

- Alternative Dispute Resolution (ADRs)
- Corporate Laws & Management
- Cyber Law
- Drafting of Legislation, Treaties and Agreements (Not available)
- Environmental Law & Management (Not available)
- Human Rights Law (Not available)
- Intellectual Property Rights Law
- International Trade Law (Not available)
- Labour Law (Not available)
- Securities & Banking Laws (Not available)
- Tax Law (Not available)

Online Certificate Courses
(3 months)

- Cyber Law
- Intellectual Property Rights and Information Technology in the Internet Age

== Notable faculty ==
- Lotika Sarkar
