= Geeta Sane =

Marathi writer

Geeta Janardan Sane (1907–1991) was a feminist writer from Maharashtra, India.

== Early life, Parents, Siblings And Education ==
Geeta Sane was born in Amravati on 3rd September 1907. At the time of her birth, her mother was 23 and father was 28.

She had a younger sister named Seeta, and another youngest sister named Shanta.

Their childhood was spent in Washim, which was then part of Akola district. At the age of 6, she was admitted into a missionary school located just outside the town. Because of her brilliance, she was promoted by one year directly to the next grade or class.

Her father's name was Janardan Bhalchandra Sane. He was a teacher who later trained to be a lawyer.

Her mother's post-marriage first name was Bhagirathi, though most people would call her by her maiden name Godavari only.

In 1920, her parents decided to send Geeta and Seeta to Hingne (Pune) for better schooling. But due to Malaria, both of them returned to Washim after one year. Geeta's parents wanted her to get married, but she stubbornly refused. Then she was sent to Amravati (MH) for further schooling where she lived in a hostel, along with her sisters Seeta and Shanta, who also schooled there.

Geeta Sane was the first female to receive a bachelor's degree in the faculty of Science (B.Sc.) from Nagpur university. Before her, females at that university, just like at most other universities in India in those times, studied liberal arts. After graduation, she taught mathematics.

== Marriage ==
Both parents of Sane were progressive in their thinking. They conducted their daughters' weddings without any religious rituals. The weddings "must have cost a rupee and a half, each," Sane once said.

In 1933, at age of 26, she married a lawyer named Narsimha Dhagamwar (aka D. Narsinh).

== Progressive ideas ==
In her college days, Sane was influenced by Marxism.

In 1927, while she was in college, a Muslim male student with the last name Khan and a Hindu female student with the last name Panandikar got married, and there was a furor, expressed by conservatives especially in the then-influential Marathi daily Pune Waibhawa (पुणें वैभव), about the interfaith marriage. Sane wrote her angry progressive response to the conservative furor.

As a feminist, she advocated a matriarchial system. She retained her last name Sane after marrying, and advanced the same name retention idea for other women. She advocated that married women in Maharashtra do away with the strong social custom of their placing on their foreheads a kuṅkūṃ dot and wearing a mangalsootra as symbols of their holy matrimonial state.

== Husband and daughters ==
In the late 1920s, Geeta Sane's future husband Narsimha Dhagamwar had been an active participant in the Indian freedom movement, and the then British government ruling over India had charged him with participation in the 1929 Meerat conspiracy.

Geeta Sane had two daughters named Vasudha Dhagamwar (elder) and Veena Padmanabhan (younger).

Vasudha Dhagamwar stayed unmarried till the end. She had a law degree, and was a journalist and a civil liberties activist.

Veena Padmanabhan is a military doctor, and now stays in Mumbai with her daughter Chitra Kulkarni.

== Authorship ==
Bharatiya Stree Jeewan (भारतीय स्त्रीजीवन) (1985) is a nonfictional work by Sane.

The following are some of her novels, most of which develop feminist themes.

- Nikhalati Hirakani (निखळती हिरकणी) (1935)
- Wathalela Wruksha (वठलेला वृक्ष) (1936)
- Hirawalikhali (हिरवळीखाली) (1936)
- Avishkar (आविष्कार) (1939)
- Pheriwala (फेरीवाला) (1939)
- Dhuke Ani Dahi.nwar (धुके आणि दहिंवर) (1942)
- Deepastambha (दीपस्तम्भ) (1950)

== Sources ==
- https://books.google.com/books?id=u297RJP9gvwC&pg=PA446
- https://books.google.com/books?id=sqBjpV9OzcsC&pg=PA347
