= National Curriculum Framework 2005 =

Fourth National Curriculum Framework published in 2005

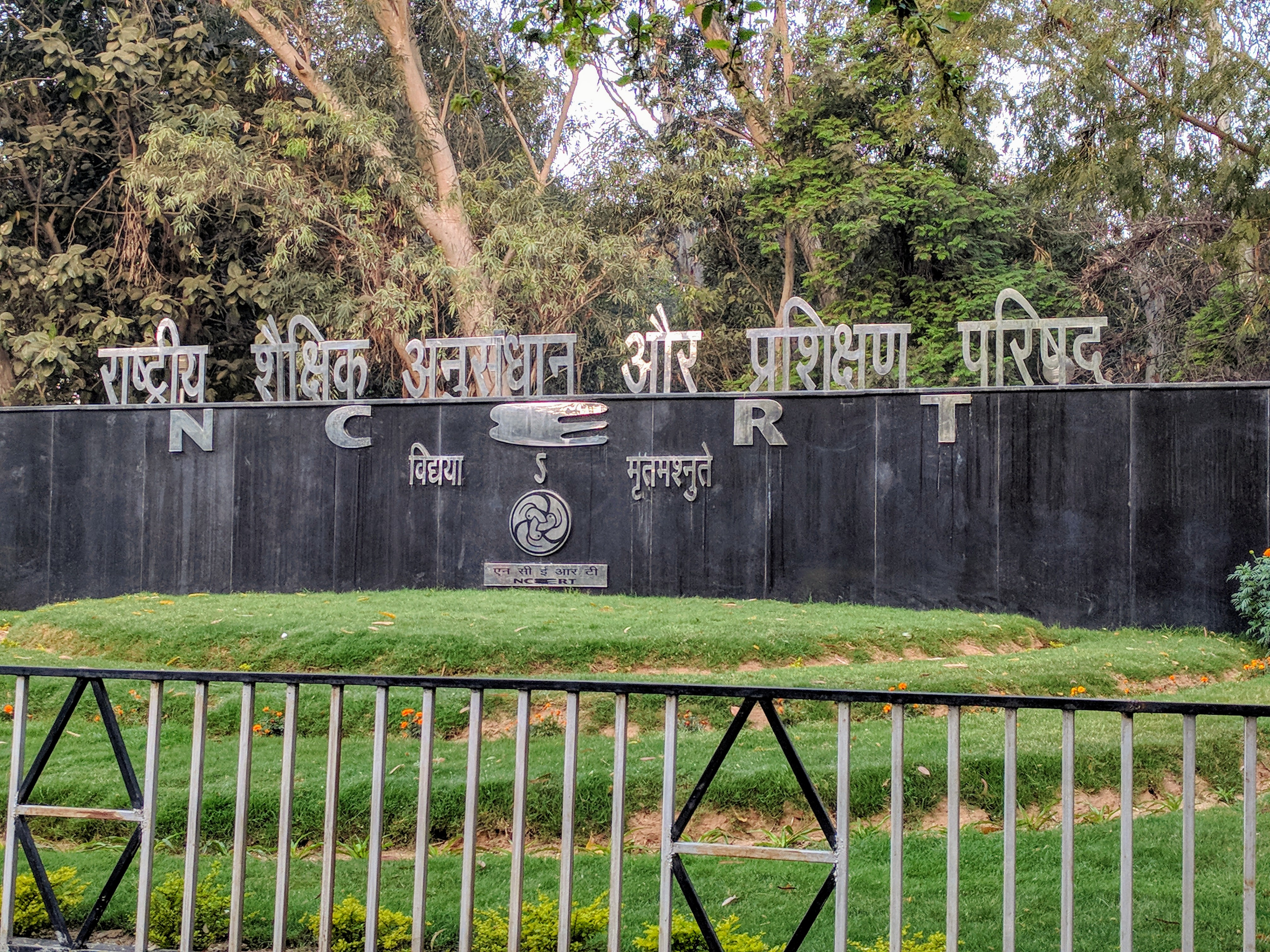
Entrance to NCERT campus on Aurobindo Marg, New Delhi.

The National Curriculum Framework 2005 (NCF 2005) is the fourth National Curriculum Framework published in 2005 by the National Council of Educational Research and Training (NCERT) in India. Its predecessors were published in 1975, 1988, 2000.

The NCF 2005 serves as a guideline for syllabus, textbooks, and teaching practices for the schools in India. The NCF 2005 has based its policies on previous government reports on education, such as Learning Without Burden and National Policy of Education 1986–1992, and focus group discussion. After multiple deliberations 21 National Focus Group Position Papers have been published to provide inputs for NCF 2005. NCF 2005 and its offshoot textbooks have come under different forms of reviews in the press.

Its draft document was criticized by the Central Advisory Board of Education (CABE). In February 2008, Krishna Kumar, then the director of NCERT, also discussed the challenges faced by the document in an interview. The subjects of NCF 2005 include all educational institutions in India. A number of its recommendations, for example, focus on rural schools. The syllabus and textbooks based on it are being used by all the CBSE schools and multiple state schools.

NCF 2005 has been translated into 22 languages and has influenced the syllabus in 17 states. The NCERT provided a grant of ₹10,00,000 to all states to promote NCF in their local language and to compare its current syllabus with the syllabus proposed, so that a plan for future reforms could be made. This exercise is being executed with the support of State Councils for Educational Research and Training (SCERT) and District Institutes of Education and Training (DIET).

On 21 September 2021, the Union Education Ministry formed a 12-member committee to develop new curriculums for School, early child, teacher and adult education.

This panel tasked with developing 4 national curriculum frameworks (NCFs) will be headed by NEP-2020 drafting committee chairperson and Former ISRO chairman (1994-2003) Krishnaswamy Kasturirangan.

K. Kasturirangan awarded three civilian awards Padma Shri in 1982, Padma Bhushan in 1992 and Padma Vibhushan in 2000.

National Curriculum Framework 2005 has often been praised by educators, students, casual readers and even critics, and is often considered the gold standard for education in India. It was succeeded by The National Curriculum Framework for School Education 2023 (NCF SE 2023)

== Components of NCF 2005 ==
=== Perspective of NCF" ===
The NCF was framed considering the articulated ideas in the past such as

- To shift learning from rote method .
- Connecting knowledge to life outside the school.
- To integrate examination into classroom learning and make it more flexible.
- To enrich the curriculum so that it goes beyond textbooks.
- Nurturing an over-riding identity informed by caring concerns within the democratic polity of the country.

NCF focused on

- Learning without burden to make learning a joyful experience and move away from textbooks to be a basis for examination and to remove stress from children. It recommended major changes in the design of syllabus.
- To develop a sense of self-reliance and dignity of the individual. This would form the basis of social relationship and would develop a sense of nonviolence and oneness across the society.
- To develop a child centered approach and to promote universal enrollment and retention up to the age of 14.
- To inculcate the feeling of oneness, democracy and unity in the students the curriculum is enabled to strengthen our national identity and to enable the new generation reevaluate.
- J. P. Nayak has described equality, quality and quantity as the elusive triangle for Indian education.
- With respect to social context NCF 2005 has ensured that irrespective of caste, creed, religion and sex all are provided with a standard curriculum.

=== Learning and knowledge ===
Learning should be an enjoyable act where children should feel that they are valued and their voices are heard. The curriculum structure and school should be designed to make school a satisfactory place for students to feel secure and valued. The curriculum should focus on the holistic development of the students to enhance physical and mental development in individuals and as well as with the peer interactions.

In order to bring about the overall development of the students, adequate nutrition, physical exercise and other psycho social needs are addressed the participation in yoga and sports is required. learning should be made enjoyable and should relate to real life experiences learning should involve concepts and deeper understanding. Adolescence is a vulnerable age for students and the curriculum should prepare the students and provide support for social and emotional support that will inculcate positive behavior and provide skills essential to cope with situations that they encounter in their lives, peers pressure and gender stereotype.

Inclusive education to be given priority and flexibility to follow a curriculum to suit the needs of every student irrespective of students having disabilities.

Constructive learning has to be part of the curriculum. Situations and opportunities have to be created for students to provide students with challenges, encourage creativity and active participation for students. Students have to be encouraged to interact with peers, teachers and older people which would open up many more rich learning opportunities.

The foundation should be laid strong and firm. primary, upper primary and middle school should provide the space for children to explore and develop rational thinking that they would imbibe in them and have sufficient knowledge of concepts, language, knowledge, investigation and validation procedures.

=== Curricular area, School stages and assessment ===
Languages - Three language formula system to be followed. medium of communication should be the home language. The First language to be studied must be the mother tongue or the regional language. The Second language – In Hindi speaking States, the second language will be some other modern Indian language or English, and – In non-Hindi speaking States, the second language will be Hindi or English. The Third language – In Hindi speaking States, the third language will be English or a modern Indian language not studied as the second language, and – In non-Hindi speaking States, the third language will be English or a modern Indian language not studied as the second language.

Mathematics -The emphasis for learning mathematics is that all students can learn the need to learn mathematics.Pedagogy and learning environment have to be made favorable for students to develop interest by going far beyond basic skills and include variety of mathematics loving models by pedagogy which devotes a greater percentage of instructional time to problem solving and active learning.mathematics makes learner systematic, confident, self evaluated, self esteem, self reliable etc.

Computers - Introduction of computers in schools is to move from a predetermined set of outcomes and skill sets to one that enables students to develop 16 explanatory reasoning and other higher-order skills. • Enable students to access sources of knowledge, interpret them, and create knowledge rather than be passive users. • Promote flexible models of curriculum transaction. • Promote individual learning styles. • Encourage use of flexible curriculum content, at least in primary education, and flexible models of evaluation.

Sciences - Pedagogy of learning sciences should be designed to address the aims of learning science is to learn the facts and principles of science and its applications, consistent with the stage of cognitive development. To acquired skills and understand the methods and processes that lead to generation and validation of scientific knowledge. To develop a historical and developmental perspective of science and to view science as a social enterprise. To relate to the, local as well as global, and appreciate the issues at the interface of science, technology and society. To acquire the requisite theoretical knowledge and practical technological skills to enter the world of work. To nurture the natural curiosity, aesthetic sense and creativity in science and technology. To imbibe the values of honesty, integrity, cooperation, concern for life and preservation of environment and to cultivate 'scientific temper'-objectivity, critical thinking and freedom from fear and prejudice.

Social Sciences - Social science a subject is included in schools to assist students to explore their interests and aptitudes in order to choose appropriate university courses and/or careers. To encourage them to explore higher levels of knowledge in different disciplines. To promote problem-solving abilities and creative thinking in the citizens of tomorrow, to introduce students to different ways of collecting and processing data and information in specific disciplines, and help them arrive at conclusions, and to generate new insights and knowledge in the process.

Art Education - The objectives of including art education in schools is to bring about the complete development of the students personality and mental health, to appreciate cultural heritage and develop respect for each other's work and connect to environment.

Health and Physical Education - To provide theoretical and practical inputs to provide an integrated and holistic understanding of health, disease, accidents and physical fitness among children. To provide skills for dealing with psycho-social issues in the school, home and the community. To help children grow as responsible citizens by inculcating in them certain social and moral values through games, sports, N.C.C., Red Cross, Scouts & Guides, etc.

Study of Peace - Skills that are developed as part of curriculum activity such as to listening with patience and endurance, purity of mind to develop concentration, aptitude for cooperation and teamwork, to reach out to get answers (curiosity and rational inquiry), acceptance of discipline, and a positive attitude to study/work are the trademarks of a good student which in turn are also the skills of a peace-oriented person. Thus the curriculum also inculcates peace and democracy into students.

Work and Education - Work related education is made as an integral component of the school curriculum, in the form of – work experience, work education, SUPW, craft education, life oriented education, pre vocational education and generic education. Work based education aims at involving children in a variety of production or service oriented activities, to develop skills, positive attitudes and values through work and also to develop work related competencies.

=== School and Classroom Environment ===
Physical environment has to be maintained favorable to students in terms of infrastructure, adequate light and ventilation, Student teacher ratio, Hygiene and safe environment. Schools should also treat students with equality, justice, respect, dignity and right of the students. Give equal opportunities for all students to participate in all activities without any bias. Policy of inclusion has to be part of the school where differently abled and children from marginalized section get equal opportunities. The schools should also be well equipped with libraries, laboratories and educational technology laboratories.

=== Systemic Reforms ===
The NCF has aimed at bringing about reforms in the education system to bring about a curriculum that is learner centric, has a flexible process, provide learner autonomy, teacher plays a role of a facilitator, supports and encourages learning, involves active participation of learners, develops multidisciplinary curriculum, focuses on education, brings about multiple and divergent exposure, multifarious, continuous appraisal in educational system.
