= Amita Dhanda =

Law professor

- Occupations: Professor and Academician

Amita Dhanda is an Indian academic, activist, and Professor Emerita (formerly professor of law) at NALSAR University of Law, Hyderabad. She was appointed one of the fourteen members of the National Advisory Council for the implementation of the RTE Act in 2010. She is on the Academic Council of Tamil Nadu National Law School. She started her career as a researcher at the Indian Law Institute, Delhi, and became a full-time Professor at NALSAR. She has contributed to the research of mental health and disability studies in India and is the head of the Centre for Disability Studies at NALSAR. Amita Dhanda identifies as a feminist and has written several papers based in gender. She has written three books, and is a guest writer for Kafila and a few other online news magazines and national daily newspapers. She carries out Interpretation Of Statutes.

== Early life ==
Amita Dhanda pursued LLM and then completed her PhD from Delhi. In 1984, she started as a researcher in Indian Institute of Law, Delhi. Justice Bhagwati, who was then Chief Justice of India decided to have her clerk for him based on her capabilities. She worked at the Institute for 15 years, that is from 1984 till 1999. She learned how to write, research, edit and teach with the assistance of renowned scholars. In her time with the Institute, she did hands on research on the mental health of prisoners in West Bengal and also suggested amendments to the Disability Act of 1995. From 1999, she joined as a full-time professor in NALSAR, where she teaches Administrative Law, Law and Poverty, Law and Literature and Judicial Process.

== Career ==
Amita Dhanda teaches legal theory, law and poverty, and sexually disoriented courses on pedagogy and inclusion. Dhanda became a professor of law and dean (academic) at National Academy of Legal Studies and Research (NALSAR) at Hyderabad after a five-year stint as a research faculty at the Indian Law Institute, Delhi. At NALSAR, she is head of the Centre for Disability Studies. She has written extensively on the legal position of persons with mental disability. Legal Order and Mental Disorder (published in 2000), Dhanda's book on the legal status of persons with mental illness is a pioneering effort in the field. She is also the Author of Decolonisation of Legal Knowledge and Engendering Law: Essays in Honor of Latika Sarkar. She has also edited N S Bindra's Interpretation of Statutes.

Dhanda was involved in the negotiations of the UN Ad Hoc Committee that drafted the UN Convention on the Rights of Persons with Disabilities adopted in December 2006. In 2011, she was a leader of a committee set up by the Ministry of Social Justice and Empowerment of the Government of India for drafting a law on the rights of people with disabilities. Dhanda is assisting the Government of Gujarat in formulating a rights sensitive mental health law. Her research expertise has been drawn upon by international and national institutions such as the WHO. She is also activist for patients rights, particularly in attempting to give agency and protections to the mentally ill, as well as to protect women who are divorced on the basis of "mental illness". Dhanda's research has been referred to by premier institutions, both nationally and internationally, such as WHO, UNICEF, NHRC, NCW, NIMH. She is also a contributing writer for Scroll, an online political and cultural news magazine. She has also written several articles for The Hindu as well, a renowned national daily. The other online magazines and National Dailies she has written for include Frontline, Kafila and Indian Express.

Dhanda is engaged in research work in mental health, child rights, disability and environment.

== Sexual harassment case ==
Professor Dhanda accused NALSAR Vice Chancellor Veer Singh of sexual harassment in 2011. She claimed that the Vice Chancellor sent her a mail on 22 December which contained a sexual innuendo; the Vice Chancellor denied this and said that he would file for defamation against Dhanda, but did not. A committee later examined and dismissed the allegations.

== Books ==
- eds. Baxi, Upendra. Dhanda, Amita. Valiant victims and lethal litigation: the Bhopal case. NM Tripathi, 1990.
- Dhanda, Amita. Engendering Law: Essays in Honor of Latika Sarkar. Eastern Book Company, 1999.
- Dhanda, Amita. Legal order and mental disorder. SAGE Publications Pvt. Limited, 2000.
- Dhanda, Amita. Decolonising of Legal Knowledge. Taylor and Francis, 2009.
- Bindra, N S. Dhandha, Amita. Interpretation of the Law of Statutes. LexisNexis, 2017.
