= Upendra Baxi =

Indian academic

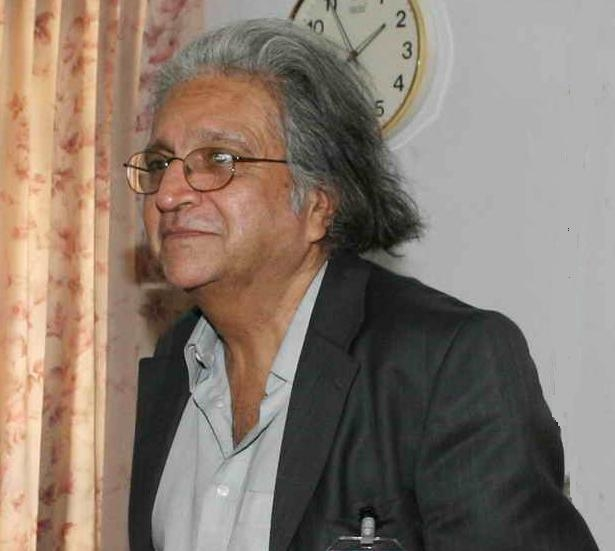
- Dr. Upendra Baxi, at NUALS
- Born: 9 November 1938 (age 87)
- Occupation: Indian academic
- Children: Pratiksha Baxi
- Awards: Padma Shri (2011)
- Website: https://warwick.ac.uk/fac/soc/law/people/upendra_baxi/

Upendra Baxi (born 9 November 1938) is a legal scholar, since 1996 professor of law in development at the University of Warwick, United Kingdom. He is presently a research professor of law and Distinguished Scholar in Public Law and Jurisprudence at the Jindal Global Law School, OP Jindal Global University. He has been the vice-chancellor of University of Delhi (1990–1994), prior to which he held the position of professor of law at the same university for 23 years (1973–1996). He has also served as the vice-chancellor of the University of South Gujarat, Surat, India (1982–1985).

In 2011, he was awarded the Padma Shri, the fourth highest civilian award in India, by the Government of India.

== Early life and education ==
Baxi earned a LL.B. from Rajkot (Gujarat) University, holds LL.M. degrees from the University of Bombay and the University of California, Berkeley. Additionally, he holds a degree of Doctorate of Juristic Sciences (S.J.D.), also from the University of California, Berkeley.

== Career ==
He taught law at Faculty of Law, University of Delhi, where he remained dean 1975–1978 and vice-chancellor of the university.

He has taught various courses at Universities of Sydney, Duke University, the American University, the New York University Law School Global Law Program, the University of Toronto and the NALSAR University of Law, Hyderabad.

He was a former Ford Foundation Professor of Human Rights at The West Bengal National University of Juridical Sciences in Kolkata, and was succeeded by Justice Ruma Pal. He has also served as the honorary director (research) at the Indian Law Institute (1985–1988) and the president of the Indian Society of International Law (1992–1995). He served on the Humanities jury for the Infosys Prize in 2012.

Baxi's areas of special expertise in teaching and research include comparative constitutionalism, social theory of human rights, human rights responsibilities in corporate governance and business conduct, and materiality of globalisation.

== Scholarly articles ==
- "Voices of Suffering and the Future of Human Rights," Transnational Law and Contemporary Problems, (Fall 1998), pp. 126–128.
- "Comment-Durkheim and Legal Evolution: Some Problems of Disproof", Law & Society Review, 1974.
- "A known but an indifferent judge": Situating Ronald Dworkin in contemporary Indian jurisprudence", International Journal of Constitutional Law, 2003: 557–589

== Edited volumes ==
- Law & Poverty. Bombay: Tripathy, 1988.

== Contributions ==
- "Voices of Suffering, Fragmented Universality, and the future of Human Rights", in The Future of International Human Rights, pp. 101–156. Edited by Burns H. Weston and Stephen P. Marks, 1999.
- "The Development of the Right to Development", in Human Rights: New Dimensions and Challenges, pp. 99–11. Edited by Janus Symonides. Dartmouth: Ashgate, 1998.
- "'The State's Emissary': The Place of Law in Subaltern Studies." in Subaltern Studies VII: Writings on South Asian Society and History. Edited by Partha Chatterjee and Gyanendra Pandey. Delhi: Oxford University Press, 1992.
- "From Human Rights to the Right to be Human: Some Heresies", in Rethinking Human Rights. Edited by S Kothari and H Sethi. Bombay: Tripathy, 1989.
- "The Struggle for Human Rights", Rethinking Human Rights. Edited by S Kothari and H Sethi. Bombay: Tripathy, 1989.
- "Taking Human Suffering Seriously: Social Action Litigation Before the Supreme Court of India", in The Role of the Judiciary in Plural Societies. Edited by Neelan Tiruchelvan & Radhika Coomaraswamy. New York: St.Martin's Press, 1987.
- "Taking Suffering Seriously", in Law and Poverty. Bombay: Tripathy, 1988.

== Books ==
- Human Rights in a Posthuman World : Critical Essays. Oxford University Press (India), 2007.
- The Future of Human Rights. Oxford University Press, 2002.
- Mambrino's Helmet?: Human Rights for a Changing World (Co-written with B Upendra). Har-Anand Publications, 1994.
- The Rights of Subordinated Peoples (Co-written with O. Mendelsohn). Oxford University Press, 1994.
- Inhuman Wrongs and Human Rights: Unconventional Essays. New Delhi: Haranand Publications, 1994.
- Towards a Sociology of Indian Law. Satvahan, 1986.
- Inconvenient Forum and Convenient Catastrophe: The Bhopal Case. Bombay: NM Tripathi, 1986.
- Mass Disasters and Multinational Liability: The Bhopal Case (Co-written with T. Paul). NM Tripathi
- The Crisis of the Indian Legal System. Vikas Publishers, 1982.
- The Indian Supreme Court and Politics. Eastern Book Co., 1980.

== Columns ==
- Columns, Indian Express
