= CIRDI =

CIRDI may refer to:

- CIRDI (institution), the International Centre for Settlement of Investment Disputes
- CIRDI (plant), the EPPO code of Cirsium discolor
