= International Investment Agreements of India =

India has concluded the following Bilateral Investment Treaties (BITs), Treaties with Investment Provisions (TIPs) and Investment Related Instruments (IRIs) according to the database of UNCTAD.

== Overview ==
International organizations such as the World Trade Organization periodically evaluate developments in trade and investment, trends and patterns in FDI and the investment regime for a particular country.

The U.S. government also periodically assesses investment conditions, openness to foreign investment, policies toward foreign direct investment, investment and tax treaties and trade facilitation measures.

== Bilateral Investment Treaties ==
| No. | Short title | Status | Parties | Date of signature | Date of entry into force |
|---|---|---|---|---|---|
| 1 | India - Israel BIT (2025) | In force | Israel | 08/09/2025 | 04/07/2026 |
| 2 | India - Uzbekistan BIT (2024) | In force | Uzbekistan | 27/09/2024 | 15/05/2025 |
| 3 | India - United Arab Emirates BIT (2024) | In force | United Arab Emirates | 13/02/2024 | 31/08/2024 |
| 4 | Brazil - India BIT (2020) | In force | Brazil | 25/01/2020 | 21/12/2025 |
| 5 | India - Kyrgyzstan BIT (2019) | In force | Kyrgyzstan | 14/06/2019 | 05/06/2025 |
| 6 | Belarus - India BIT (2018) | In force | Belarus | 24/09/2018 | 05/03/2020 |
| 7 | India - United Arab Emirates BIT (2013) | Terminated | United Arab Emirates | 12/12/2013 | 21/08/2014 |
| 8 | India - Nepal BIT (2011) | Terminated | Nepal | 21/10/2011 | |
| 9 | India - Slovenia BIT (2011) | Terminated | Slovenia | 14/06/2011 | |
| 10 | India - Lithuania BIT (2011) | In force | Lithuania | 31/03/2011 | 01/12/2011 |
| 11 | India - Seychelles BIT (2010) | Terminated | Seychelles | 02/06/2010 | |
| 12 | Congo, Democratic Republic of the - India BIT (2010) | Terminated | Congo, Democratic Republic of the | 13/04/2010 | |
| 13 | India - Latvia BIT (2010) | Terminated | Latvia | 18/02/2010 | 27/11/2010 |
| 14 | Colombia - India BIT (2009) | In force | Colombia | 10/11/2009 | 02/07/2012 |
| 15 | India - Mozambique BIT (2009) | Terminated | Mozambique | 19/02/2009 | 23/09/2009 |
| 16 | Bangladesh - India BIT (2009) | In force | Bangladesh | 09/02/2009 | 07/07/2011 |
| 17 | India - Senegal BIT (2008) | In force | Senegal | 03/07/2008 | 17/10/2009 |
| 18 | India - Myanmar BIT (2008) | Terminated | Myanmar | 24/06/2008 | 08/02/2009 |
| 19 | India - Syrian Arab Republic BIT (2008) | Terminated | Syrian Arab Republic | 18/06/2008 | 22/01/2009 |
| 20 | Brunei Darussalam - India BIT (2008) | Terminated | Brunei Darussalam | 22/05/2008 | 18/01/2009 |
| 21 | India - North Macedonia (2008) | Terminated | North Macedonia | 17/03/2008 | 17/10/2008 |
| 22 | India - Uruguay BIT (2008) | Terminated | Uruguay | 11/02/2008 | |
| 23 | Ethiopia - India BIT (2007) | Terminated | Ethiopia | 05/07/2007 | |
| 24 | Iceland - India BIT (2007) | Terminated | Iceland | 29/06/2007 | 16/12/2008 |
| 25 | India - Libya BIT (2007) | In force | Libya | 26/05/2007 | 23/03/2009 |
| 26 | India - Mexico BIT (2007) | Terminated | Mexico | 21/05/2007 | 23/02/2008 |
| 27 | Greece - India BIT (2007) | Terminated | Greece | 26/04/2007 | 10/04/2008 |
| 28 | India - Trinidad and Tobago BIT (2007) | Terminated | Trinidad and Tobago | 12/03/2007 | 07/10/2007 |
| 29 | India - Jordan BIT (2006) | Terminated | Jordan | 30/11/2006 | 22/01/2009 |
| 30 | China - India BIT (2006) | Terminated | China | 21/11/2006 | 01/08/2007 |
| 31 | India - Slovakia BIT (2006) | Terminated | Slovakia | 25/09/2006 | 16/06/2007 |
| 32 | Bosnia and Herzegovina - India BIT (2006) | Terminated | Bosnia and Herzegovina | 12/09/2006 | 13/02/2008 |
| 33 | India - Saudi Arabia BIT (2006) | Terminated | Saudi Arabia | 25/01/2006 | 20/05/2008 |
| 34 | Bahrain - India BIT (2004) | Terminated | Bahrain | 13/01/2004 | 05/12/2007 |
| 35 | Hungary - India BIT (2003) | Terminated | Hungary | 03/11/2003 | 02/01/2006 |
| 36 | India - Sudan BIT (2003) | Terminated | Sudan | 22/10/2003 | 18/10/2010 |
| 37 | Armenia - India BIT (2003) | Terminated | Armenia | 23/05/2003 | 30/05/2006 |
| 38 | Djibouti - India BIT (2003) | Terminated | Djibouti | 19/05/2003 | |
| 39 | India - Serbia BIT (2003) | Terminated | Serbia | 31/01/2003 | 24/02/2009 |
| 40 | Belarus - India BIT (2002) | Terminated | Belarus | 27/11/2002 | 23/11/2003 |
| 41 | Finland - India BIT (2002) | Terminated | Finland | 07/11/2002 | 09/04/2003 |
| 42 | India - Taiwan Province of China BIT (2002) | Terminated | Taiwan Province of China | 17/10/2002 | 28/11/2002 |
| 43 | India - Yemen BIT (2002) | Terminated | Yemen | 01/10/2002 | 10/02/2004 |
| 44 | Ghana - India BIT (2002) | Terminated | Ghana | 05/08/2002 | |
| 45 | Cyprus - India BIT (2002) | Terminated | Cyprus | 09/04/2002 | 12/01/2004 |
| 46 | India - Ukraine BIT (2001) | Terminated | Ukraine | 01/12/2001 | 12/08/2003 |
| 47 | India - Kuwait BIT (2001) | Terminated | Kuwait | 27/11/2001 | 28/06/2003 |
| 48 | Croatia - India BIT (2001) | Terminated | Croatia | 04/05/2001 | 19/01/2002 |
| 49 | India - Mongolia BIT (2001) | Terminated | Mongolia | 03/01/2001 | 29/04/2002 |
| 50 | India - Lao People's Democratic Republic BIT (2000) | Terminated | Lao People's Democratic Republic | 09/11/2000 | 05/01/2003 |
| 51 | India - Thailand BIT (2000) | Terminated | Thailand | 10/07/2000 | 13/07/2001 |
| 52 | India - Sweden BIT (2000) | Terminated | Sweden | 04/07/2000 | 01/04/2001 |
| 53 | India - Portugal BIT (2000) | Terminated | Portugal | 28/06/2000 | 19/07/2002 |
| 54 | India - Philippines BIT (2000) | In force | Philippines | 28/01/2000 | 29/01/2001 |
| 55 | Austria - India BIT (1999) | Terminated | Austria | 08/11/1999 | 01/03/2001 |
| 56 | Argentina - India BIT (1999) | Terminated | Argentina | 20/08/1999 | 12/08/2002 |
| 57 | India - Uzbekistan BIT (1999) | Terminated | Uzbekistan | 18/05/1999 | 28/07/2000 |
| 58 | India - Qatar BIT (1999) | Terminated | Qatar | 07/04/1999 | 15/12/1999 |
| 59 | Australia - India BIT (1999) | Terminated | Australia | 26/02/1999 | 04/05/2000 |
| 60 | India - Morocco BIT (1999) | Terminated | Morocco | 13/02/1999 | 22/02/2001 |
| 61 | India - Indonesia BIT (1999) | Terminated | Indonesia | 10/02/1999 | 22/01/2004 |
| 62 | India - Zimbabwe BIT (1999) | Terminated | Zimbabwe | 10/02/1999 | |
| 63 | Bulgaria - India BIT (1998) | Terminated | Bulgaria | 29/10/1998 | 23/09/1999 |
| 64 | India - Turkey BIT (1998) | Terminated | Türkiye | 17/09/1998 | 18/10/2007 |
| 65 | India - Mauritius BIT (1998) | Terminated | Mauritius | 04/09/1998 | 20/06/2000 |
| 66 | India - Romania BIT (1997) | Terminated | Romania | 17/11/1997 | 09/12/1999 |
| 67 | BLEU (Belgium-Luxembourg Economic Union) - India BIT (1997) | Terminated | BLEU (Belgium-Luxembourg Economic Union) | 31/10/1997 | 08/01/2001 |
| 68 | India - Spain BIT (1997) | Terminated | Spain | 30/09/1997 | 15/12/1998 |
| 69 | France - India BIT (1997) | Terminated | France | 02/09/1997 | 17/05/2000 |
| 70 | India - Kyrgyzstan BIT (1997) | Terminated | Kyrgyzstan | 16/05/1997 | 12/05/2000 |
| 71 | Egypt - India BIT (1997) | Terminated | Egypt | 09/04/1997 | 22/11/2000 |
| 72 | India - Switzerland BIT (1997) | Terminated | Switzerland | 04/04/1997 | 16/02/2000 |
| 73 | India - Oman BIT (1997) | Terminated | Oman | 02/04/1997 | 13/10/2000 |
| 74 | India - Viet Nam BIT (1997) | Terminated | Viet Nam | 08/03/1997 | 01/12/1999 |
| 75 | India - Sri Lanka BIT (1997) | Terminated | Sri Lanka | 22/01/1997 | 13/02/1998 |
| 76 | India - Kazakhstan BIT (1996) | Terminated | Kazakhstan | 09/12/1996 | 26/07/2001 |
| 77 | Czech Republic - India BIT (1996) | Terminated | Czechia | 11/10/1996 | 06/02/1998 |
| 78 | India - Poland BIT (1996) | Terminated | Poland | 07/10/1996 | 31/12/1997 |
| 79 | India - Korea, Republic of BIT (1996) | Terminated | Korea, Republic of | 26/02/1996 | 07/05/1996 |
| 80 | India - Israel BIT (1996) | Terminated | Israel | 29/01/1996 | 18/02/1997 |
| 81 | India - Tajikistan BIT (1995) | Terminated | Tajikistan | 13/12/1995 | 14/11/2003 |
| 82 | India - Italy BIT (1995) | Terminated | Italy | 23/11/1995 | 26/03/1998 |
| 83 | India - Netherlands BIT (1995) | Terminated | Netherlands | 06/11/1995 | 01/12/1996 |
| 84 | India - Turkmenistan BIT (1995) | Terminated | Turkmenistan | 20/09/1995 | 27/02/2006 |
| 85 | Denmark - India BIT (1995) | Terminated | Denmark | 06/09/1995 | 28/08/1996 |
| 86 | India - Malaysia BIT (1995) | Terminated | Malaysia | 03/08/1995 | 12/04/1997 |
| 87 | Germany - India BIT (1995) | Terminated | Germany | 10/07/1995 | 13/07/1998 |
| 88 | India - Russian Federation BIT (1994) | Terminated | Russian Federation | 23/12/1994 | 14/08/1996 |
| 89 | India - United Kingdom BIT (1994) | Terminated | United Kingdom | 14/03/1994 | 06/01/1995 |

== Treaties with Investment Provisions ==
| No. | Short title | Status | Parties | Date of signature | Date of entry into force |
|---|---|---|---|---|---|
| 1 | India - New Zealand FTA (2026) | Signed (not in force) | New Zealand | 27/04/2026 | |
| 2 | India - Oman CEPA (2025) | In force | Oman | 18/12/2025 | 01/06/2026 |
| 3 | India - United Kingdom Comprehensive Economic and Trade Agreement (2025) | Signed (not in force) | United Kingdom | 24/07/2025 | |
| 4 | IPEF Clean Economy Agreement (2024) | In force | Australia, Brunei Darussalam, Fiji, Indonesia, Japan, Korea, Republic of, Malaysia, New Zealand, Philippines, Singapore, Thailand, United States of America, Viet Nam | 06/06/2024 | 11/10/2024 |
| 5 | EFTA - India TEPA (2024) | In force | EFTA (European Free Trade Association) | 10/03/2024 | 01/10/2025 |
| 6 | IPEF Supply Chain Agreement (2023) | In force | Australia, Brunei Darussalam, Fiji, Indonesia, Japan, Korea, Republic of, Malaysia, New Zealand, Philippines, Singapore, Thailand, United States of America, Viet Nam | 14/11/2023 | 24/02/2024 |
| 7 | Australia - India ECTA (2022) | In force | Australia | 02/04/2022 | 29/12/2022 |
| 8 | India - United Arab Emirates CEPA (2022) | In force | United Arab Emirates | 18/02/2022 | 01/05/2022 |
| 9 | Mauritius - India CECPA (2021) | In force | Mauritius | 22/02/2021 | 01/04/2021 |
| 10 | ASEAN - India Investment Agreement (2014) | In force | ASEAN (Association of South-East Asian Nations) | 12/11/2014 | 01/07/2015 |
| 11 | India - Malaysia FTA (2011) | In force | Malaysia | 18/02/2011 | 01/07/2011 |
| 12 | India - Japan EPA (2011) | In force | Japan | 16/02/2011 | 01/08/2011 |
| 13 | India - Korea, Republic of CEPA (2009) | In force | Korea, Republic of | 07/08/2009 | 01/01/2010 |
| 14 | India - Singapore CECA (2005) | In force | Singapore | 29/06/2005 | 01/08/2005 |
| 15 | Chile - India Framework Agreement (2005) | Signed (not in force) | Chile | 20/01/2005 | |
| 16 | GCC - India Framework Agreement (2004) | Signed (not in force) | GCC (Gulf Cooperation Council) | 25/08/2004 | |
| 17 | BIMSTEC Framework Agreement (2004) | In force | | 08/02/2004 | 30/06/2004 |
| 18 | SAFTA (2004) | In force | | 06/01/2004 | 01/01/2006 |
| 19 | India - Thailand Framework Agreement (2003) | Signed (not in force) | Thailand | 09/10/2003 | |
| 20 | ASEAN - India Framework Agreement (2003) | In force | ASEAN (Association of South-East Asian Nations) | 08/10/2003 | 01/07/2004 |
| 21 | India - MERCOSUR Framework Agreement (2003) | In force | MERCOSUR (Mercado Común Sudamericano) | 17/06/2003 | 01/06/2009 |
| 22 | EC - India Cooperation Agreement (1993) | In force | EU (European Union) | 20/12/1993 | 01/08/1994 |

== Investment Related Instruments ==
| No. | Short title | Date of adoption | Level | Type |
|---|---|---|---|---|
| 1 | India Model BIT 2003 (replaced) | 2003 | National | Model agreements |
| 2 | India Model BIT 2015 | 28/12/2015 | National | Model agreements |
| 3 | TRIPS | 1994 | Multilateral | Intergovernmental agreements |
| 4 | TRIMS | 1994 | Multilateral | Intergovernmental agreements |
| 5 | MIGA Convention | 1985 | Multilateral | Intergovernmental agreements |
| 6 | New York Convention | 1958 | Multilateral | Intergovernmental agreements |
| 7 | Fifth Protocol to GATS | 1997 | Multilateral | Intergovernmental agreements |
| 8 | Fourth Protocol to GATS | 1997 | Multilateral | Intergovernmental agreements |
| 9 | GATS | 1994 | Multilateral | Intergovernmental agreements |
| 10 | IPEF Fair Economy Agreement | 06/06/2024 | Regional/Plurilateral | Intergovernmental agreements |
| 11 | UN Code of Conduct on Transnational Corporations | 1983 | Multilateral | Draft instruments |
| 12 | Doha Declaration | 2001 | Multilateral | Guidelines, principles, resolutions and similar |
| 13 | World Bank Investment Guidelines | 1992 | Multilateral | Guidelines, principles, resolutions and similar |
| 14 | ILO Tripartite Declaration on Multinational Enterprises | 2000 | Multilateral | Guidelines, principles, resolutions and similar |
| 15 | ILO Tripartite Declaration on Multinational Enterprises | 2006 | Multilateral | Guidelines, principles, resolutions and similar |
| 16 | ILO Tripartite Declaration on Multinational Enterprises | 1977 | Multilateral | Guidelines, principles, resolutions and similar |
| 17 | Singapore Ministerial Declaration | 1996 | Multilateral | Guidelines, principles, resolutions and similar |
| 18 | UN Guiding Principles on Business and Human Rights | 2011 | Multilateral | Guidelines, principles, resolutions and similar |
| 19 | Permanent Sovereignty UN Resolution | 1962 | Multilateral | Guidelines, principles, resolutions and similar |
| 20 | New International Economic Order UN Resolution | 1974 | Multilateral | Guidelines, principles, resolutions and similar |
| 21 | Charter of Economic Rights and Duties of States | 1974 | Multilateral | Guidelines, principles, resolutions and similar |

== See also ==
- Foreign relations of India
- Economy of India
