= World Integrated Trade Solution =

World Bank database software

The World Integrated Trade Solution (WITS) is a trade software provided by the World Bank for users to query several international trade databases.

WITS allows the user to query trade statistics (export, import, re-exports and re-imports) from the UN's repository of official international trade statistics and relevant analytical tables (UN COMTRADE), tariff and non-tariff measures data from UNCTAD trade analysis and information system, tariff and bound tariff information from WTO's integrated data base for applied tariffs and imports, and from the WTO's consolidated tariff schedules database for the bound duties of all WTO members. WITS also has a module called global preferential trade agreement to search and browse free trade agreements. It also has modules to calculate several trade indicators and perform tariff cut simulation.

WITS has multiple sections, including summary trade statistics by country on total exports, imports, export/import partners, top product groups exported/imported, top exporters and importers in the World, derived analytical databases, and a WITS application allowing the user to use the underlying data to generate custom trade statistics and indicators and tariff cut simulations.

== Summary trade statistics by country ==
The trade data for each country is divided into four sections. The first section is the country profile summary, and provides summary of the key indicators in trade, tariffs, trade indicators, top export and import partners of the country, and top exported products. The next section is by trading partner and provides the top export or import partners of the country with the trade value, partner share. The final section is by product group, providing details of exports and imports of the country by various standard product groups like by HS sector, SITC revision 2 standard product groups, and UNCTAD's stages of processing. Trade Statistics By Country

== Advanced analysis ==
The second section of WITS allows users to perform advanced analysis and select their own set of country and country groups, product and product groups, bulk download data, analyze trade competitiveness of countries and perform tariff cut simulation. The trade outcomes module provides a flexible array of options. These options include the selection of countries of interest, product classifications, the usage of reported or mirrored data, and the years of the analysis. In addition, users can also create ad-hoc country and product groups or—when relevant—investigate specific trading partners. It is also possible to generate only a subset of indicators and get comparative data on peer countries. The user's guideline document provides specific details for these options.

As an alternative to the indicator by indicator analysis, the software offers a built-in set of choices that the user can automatically employ to generate the set of indicators by section for the country and the year of choice. The output is data for each indicator along with a companion visualization. WITS User Manual

== Trade indicators ==
WITS allows the user to calculate and visualize the following trade outcome indicators:

- Country's share of world exports
- Share of product in total exports
- Share of market in total exports
- Hirschman Herfindahl index
- Revealed comparative advantage index
- Trade intensity index
- Trade complementarity index
- Export diversification (or concentration) index
- Export specialization index
- Index of export market penetration

== Trade outcomes indicators ==
WITS has a trade outcomes indicators module that can be used to review the country-level performance of exports along various dimensions. The trade outcomes tool follows the analytical framework developed in the World Bank's trade competitiveness diagnostic toolkit. It provides indicators along four different dimensions of trade performance: (i) the composition, orientation, and growth of exports and imports, (ii) the degree of export diversification across products and markets, (iii) the level of sophistication of a country's main exports, and (iv) the survival rate of its export relationships. The toolkit can be used to assess the competitiveness of a country's overall basket of products as well as specific traded sectors. It facilitates the identification of the primary constraints to improved trade competitiveness and the policy responses to overcome these constraints.

== Global value chain analysis ==
WITS has introduced a module for global value chain analysis using the underlying UN Comtrade data on gross exports and imports. The module construct trade indicators related to country's participation in global value chains. Using the informed classifications based on Sturgeon and Memedovic (2011) paper. The module allows measuring global value chains related performance through: (i) country analysis, (ii) regional analysis, (iii) inter-regional analysis, and analysis of (iv) individual products of interest.
