= Urbaser v Argentina =

2016 arbitration award

- Court: International Centre for Settlement of Investment Disputes
- Decided: 18 December 2016
- Citation: ARB/07/26

Urbaser v Argentina is a 2016 award of the International Centre for Settlement of Investment Disputes (ICSID).

It was the first award to directly examine the application of the human right to water to an investment dispute regarding a privatized water supply and sanitation service.

== Background ==
A Spanish company, Urbaser (the investor), was one of the main shareholders of a concession Aguas Del Gran Buenos Aires SA (AGBA) that provided water services in Buenos Aires. As a result of the economic crisis experienced by Argentina between 1998 and 2002, Argentina introduced emergency measures that impacted the financial position of the investment.
