= Policy framework =

A policy framework is a document that sets out a set of procedures or goals, which might be used in negotiation or decision-making to guide a more detailed set of policies, or to guide ongoing maintenance of an organization's policies.

Policy framework or specific frameworks may refer to:

- Sender Policy Framework
- Security Policy Framework
- NIST Cybersecurity Framework
- National Planning Policy Framework
- Investment Policy Framework for Sustainable Development
- National Policy Framework for Strategic Gateways and Trade Corridors
