= UNCTAD Division on Investment and Enterprise =

UNCTAD's Division on Investment and Enterprise (DIAE) is a research and policy practice centre of the United Nations Conference on Trade and Development whose work focuses on investment and enterprise with a particular view on development. The Division's overarching mandate is to steer sustainable development and inclusive growth objectives through investment and enterprise development, productive capacity-building, industrialization and economic diversification. Its work programme is tailored to serve all UN member States, with a particular emphasis on the needs of least-developed and other structurally weak and vulnerable economies.

== History ==
Prompted by a marked rise in cross-border investment activity, the UN in 1974 set up a permanent intergovernmental forum to deliberate on issues related to transnational corporations (TNCs), notably their developmental impact. The initial focus of the United Nations Centre on Transnational Corporations (UNCTC) was to contain the political and economic influence of TNCs. Over time a more nuanced approach evolved, which factored in the positive contribution TNCs can make to development. Analytical work thus expanded to cover strategies for attracting foreign direct investment (FDI) and harnessing such flows for growth, employment and poverty alleviation.

The launch of the Uruguay Round of Multilateral Trade Negotiations – which brought trade-related investment measures and trade-related aspects of intellectual property rights into the trade negotiation ambit – added another dimension to the UNCTC's work as it assisted developing countries to formulate negotiation positions on these new issues. In 1993 the TNC programme was brought under the auspices of UNCTAD. With an expanded work programme that includes investment and enterprise development issues at large, it is now formally known as the Division on Investment and Enterprise, with offices in Geneva.

== Function and work programme ==
The civision's programme of work is driven by UN member States' evolving needs in the area of global investment and enterprise. Its formal mandate is principally determined by the quadrennial UNCTAD Ministerial Conference and its subsidiary bodies, the Trade and Development Board and the Investment, Enterprise and Development Commission.

To holistically serve member States' interests, outputs are impact-oriented and span three interlinked operational spheres: (1) the compilation of a comprehensive body of knowledge through research, data collection and policy analysis; (2) achieving practical outcomes through capacity-building and technical assistance; and (3) contributing to systemic coherence in the area of international investment policy through consensus-building among UN member States.

The DIAE's work programme spans two flagships – the World Investment Report and the World Investment Forum – and seven core products and/or services: the investment policy monitor and the global investment trends monitor; International Investment Agreements; investment policy reviews; investment information systems; the Investment Facilitation Compact; entrepreneurship development and International Standards for Accounting and Reporting. In addition it maintains the World Investment Network, a subscription-based mailing list of more than 9 000 members to whom the DIAE's work on investment and enterprise is disseminated.

The Division's body of work is highly relevant for policymakers, the private sector, practitioners and academics, and is recognized by government ministries and peer organizations as leading-edge and agenda-setting. It maintains one of the most comprehensive data bases on FDI and M&A statistics, FDI and TNC research and investment regulation, with information and data on more than 200 economies spanning a period of 40 years. Other work is focused in the areas of corporate social responsibility (CSR) and small and medium enterprise (SME) development, while enterprises in 30 countries receive direct, practical support through the Empretec programme.

Several development-related activities are done in partnership with other key international entities. Within the corporate social responsibility ambit, the DIAE has developed, in collaboration with the World Bank, Food and Agriculture Organization of the UN and the International Fund for Agricultural Development, the Principles for Responsible Agricultural Investment (PRAI), which emphasizes the preservation of rights, livelihoods and resources in farming communities.

The Division is also involved in the Sustainable Stock Exchanges project, an initiative to enhance corporate transparency and performance on environmental, social and corporate governance and encourage responsible long-term approaches to investment.

In addition, a key partnership has been forged between UNCTAD and the G20 in the area of investment and development. In service of this partnership, the DIAE supports the work of the G20 in several areas, notably measuring the employment and development impact of investment and promoting private standards for responsible investment. The G20 and DIAE have also issued a joint report on private investment and job creation; and the DIAE collaborates with the OECD on tracking and compiling the annual report on G20 investment measures.

== Organizational structure ==
The DIAE, under guidance of director James Zhan, comprises four branches: Investment Trends and Issues; Investment Policies; Investment Capacity-Building and Enterprise Development. The branches focus on their individual issue areas but also work in concert on flagship outputs of the Division, such as the World Investment Report and the World Investment Forum.

== Select publications, tools and events ==
The DIAE's mainstay products are the annual World Investment Report (WIR) and the World Investment Forum.

The World Investment Forum is a biennial, multi-stakeholder summit designed to facilitate dialogue and action on key emerging investment-related challenges.

The World Investment Report is the primary reference document on global investment issues. Drawing on the expertise of in-house and external international investment specialists, the report compiles comprehensive data, and trends and policy analysis around a particular topical investment theme each year, supplemented by recommendations on how the findings can be harnessed to achieve pro-developmental outcomes. Themes covered in the past included investment in the low-carbon economy (WIR 2010) and non-equity modes of production and development (WIR 2011). The WIR 2012 focused on the need to shape a new generation of investment policies.

Two new tools were developed and launched to better assist policymakers: The Investment Policy Framework for Sustainable Development was released alongside the WIR 2012 and consists of a set of core principles to guide investment policymaking and a framework for the design and negotiation of international investment agreements. The second tool, UNCTAD’s Entrepreneurship Policy Framework, is a practical guideline to assist with promoting a dynamic entrepreneurship culture and facilitating new business start-ups in developing countries, in particular the least-developed (LDCs).

Another core service is the Investment Policy Reviews, conducted upon the request of individual countries. The review comprises a comprehensive and objective evaluation of the legal, regulatory and institutional framework to attract investment at home and from abroad, with a set of recommendations on how the framework could be changed to maximize benefits from investment. The review scope encompasses FDI entry and establishment, treatment and protection of investment, taxation, the business environment and sectoral regulations.
