= World Investment Forum =

Biennial investment forum

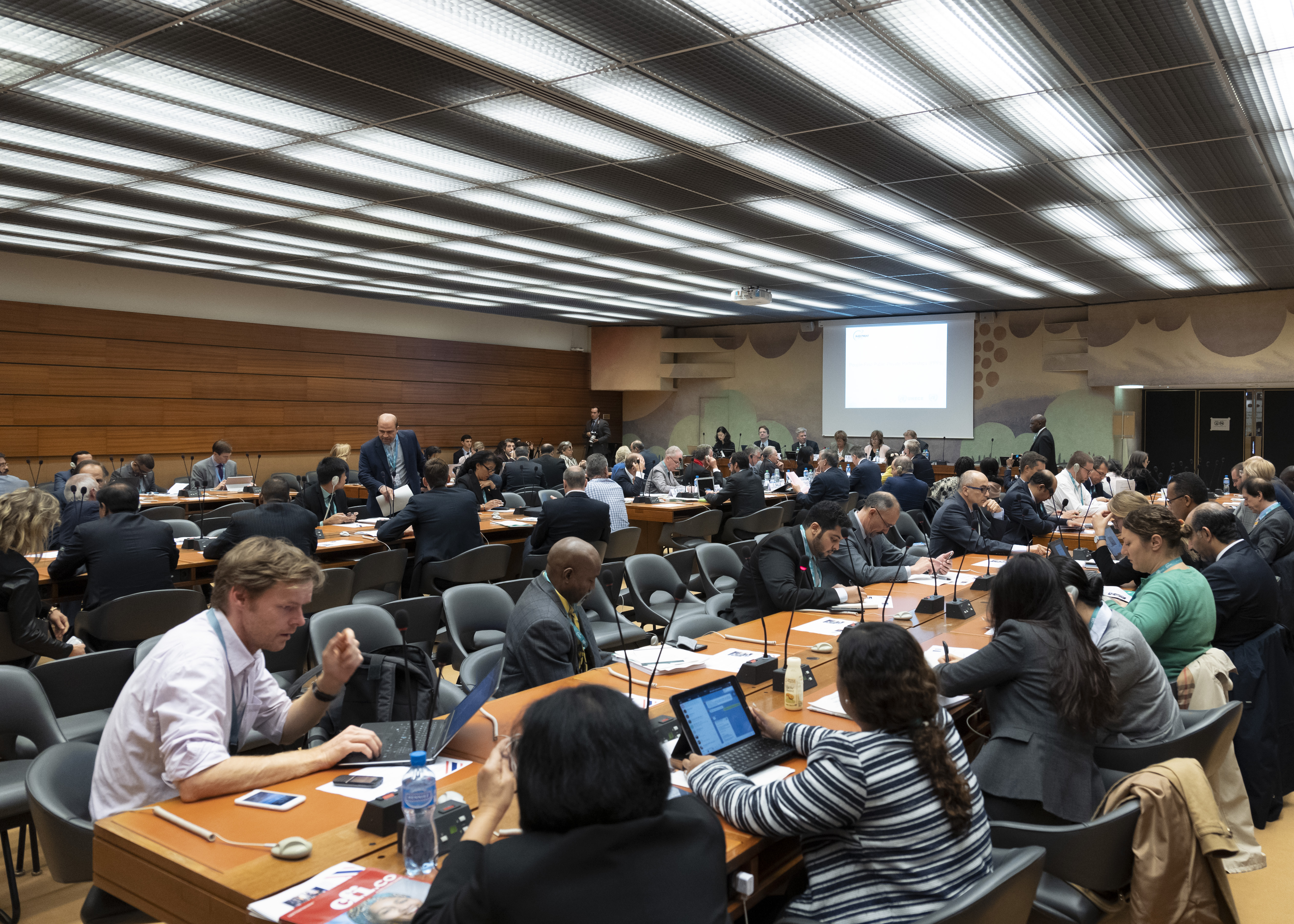
- A general view of participants in People-First Public-Private Partnerships during the World Investment Forum 2018
- Status: Active
- Genre: Investments
- Frequency: Biennial
- Location: Different location for each forum
- Country: United Nations
- Years active: 17–18
- Inaugurated: April 2008
- Founder: UN Trade and Development
- Participants: Policymakers, Ministers, government officials and representatives from the private sector, academia, research institutions and NGOs
- Website: worldinvestmentforum.unctad.org

The World Investment Forum (WIF) is a biennial investment forum organized by the United Nations Conference on Trade and Development (UNCTAD) to promote investment for sustainable development and facilitate policy dialogue among a diverse community of investment stakeholders.

The forum brings together policymakers, including Heads of State and Government, Ministers and other government officials responsible for investment; representatives from the private sector, including CEOs; international organisations working in the area of sustainable development and poverty reduction; thought leaders from academia and research institutions; and other members of the international investment community, including treaty negotiators, investment promotion and location experts, heads of sovereign wealth funds, heads of stock exchanges, and NGOs.

== History of the World Investment Forum ==
=== The WIF 2008 ===
The inaugural World Investment Forum was held in Accra, Ghana, on the occasion of the twelfth UNCTAD Ministerial Conference in April 2008. It focused on the future of foreign direct investment (FDI) flows: where FDI will come from and which sectors and regions will be the main targets of these flows, as well as the features of corporate strategies that will drive cross-border investment.

=== The WIF 2010 ===
The second UNCTAD World Investment Forum took place in Xiamen, China, in September 2010. The forum consolidated its main mission to promote investment for sustainable development and provide a platform that could bring together the international investment community at the highest level. The 2010 forum examined some of the development challenges and opportunities presented by the post-crisis investment landscape. It also provided inputs into the formulation of a new generation of national and international investment policies to foster sustainable development and the achievement of the Millennium Development Goals.

With more than 1,800 participants from 120 countries, including nine heads of State, 79 ministerial-level officials and 1,160 senior business executives, the second forum established the WIF as arguably the most influential platform for open, inclusive, and high-level international investment discourse.

The WIF 2010 also established some of the forum's signature events, such as the International Investment Agreement (IIA) Conference, which focused on key systemic and developmental challenges facing the IIA regime and the investor-State dispute settlement system. Its emphasis on "investment underpinned by sustainable development" paved the way for the drafting of UNCTAD's Investment Policy Framework for Sustainable Development, which was launched during WIF 2012. Another development-centered conference was hosted on Sustainable Stock Exchanges, highlighting the environmental, social, and governance dimensions of listed companies and how stock exchanges can help foster responsible long-term approaches to investment.

=== The WIF 2012 ===
The third forum was held in Doha, Qatar, alongside the thirteenth UNCTAD Ministerial Conference, in April 2012. The event addressed the investment challenges and opportunities arising from emerging global economic governance structures and contributed to the development of policy options and partnerships for promoting sustainable investment to foster inclusive growth.

After the 2008 financial crisis and crisis-related unrest, notably in the Arab region, the WIF 2012 explored how international investment could be made more inclusive and contribute to addressing some of the perceived causes of economic and social unrest, such as unemployment. Participants debated ways in which governments could attract international investors to support economic transformation and set countries on a path towards sustainable and inclusive development.

More than 1,400 investment stakeholders from 145 countries participated in WIF 2012's fifteen main events, as well as its other networking meetings and side events. Among the countries represented, high-level policymakers from more than 30 least-developed countries (LDCs) took part in the forum, giving credence to the forum's aim of promoting pro-poor investment in these economies. The World Investment Leaders' Summit, one of the forum's key events, brought together eight Heads and former Heads of State and Government and six global CEOs, while the Ministerial Roundtable gathered together over 30 ministerial-level participants. Reflecting the increasing prominence of Sovereign wealth funds (SWFs), the 2012 forum brought together SWF executives and government ministers for the first time at the WIF.

The 2012 forum led to the high-level recognition and endorsement by ministers and Heads of State and government of investment for sustainable development as a principle for policymaking and investor decisions, and the launch of three of UNCTAD's investment-related policy tools: namely the Investment Policy Framework for Sustainable Development, the Entrepreneurship Policy Framework, and a new accounting development toolkit.

=== The WIF 2014 ===
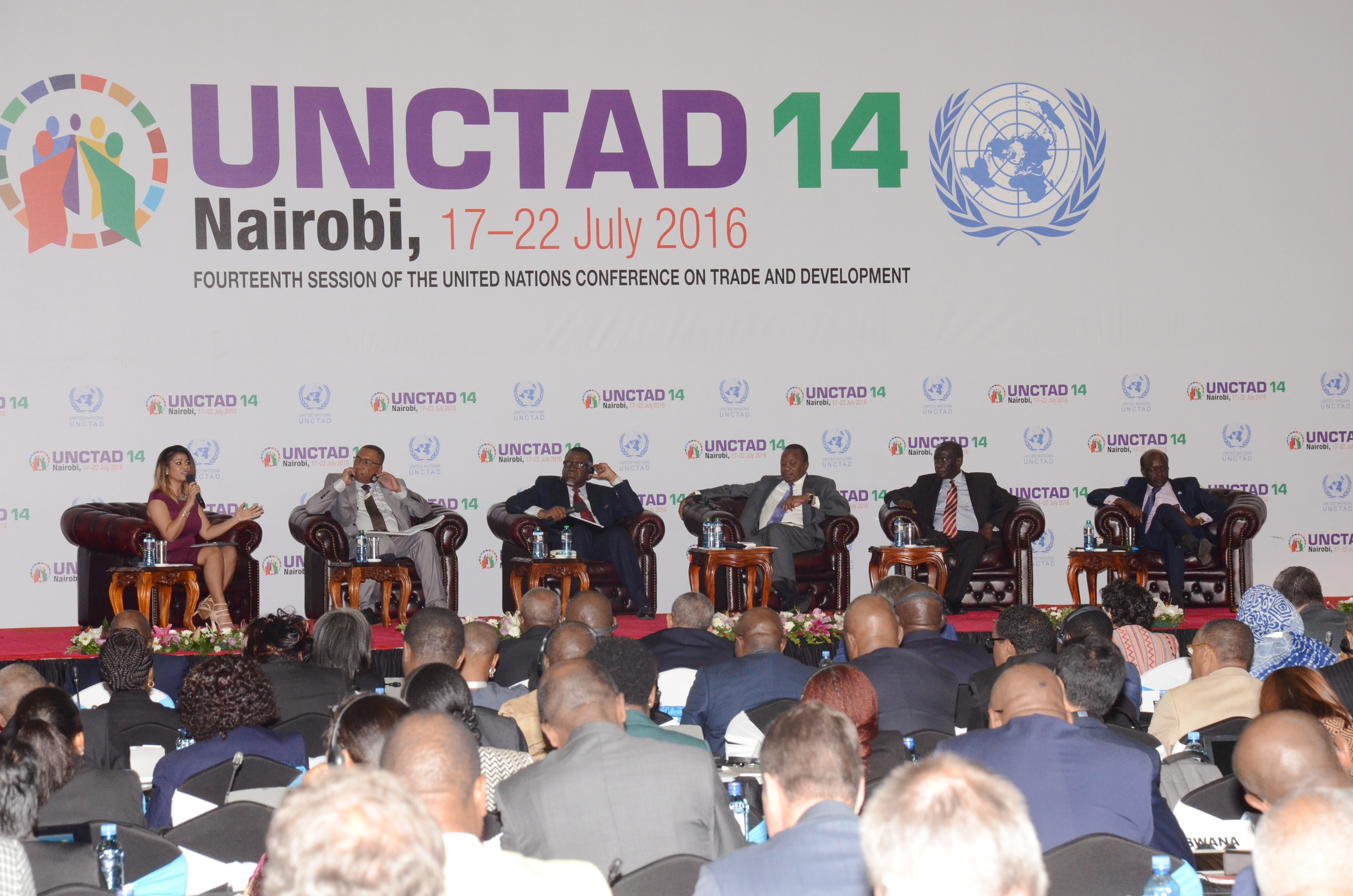
The World Investment Forum 2014

The 2014 Investment Forum took place in the Palais des Nations in Geneva, Switzerland, from the 13–16 October 2014. The forum aims were to be the biggest yet with a greater number of events spread over more days.

=== The WIF 2016 ===
The fifth forum was held in Nairobi, Kenya on the 17-21 July 2016.

=== The WIF 2018 ===
The sixth forum was held in Geneva, Switzerland on the 22-26 October 2018.

=== The WIF 2021 ===
The 7th forum was delayed because of the COVID-19 pandemic and was eventually held virtually on the 18-22 October 2021.

=== The WIF 2023 ===
The 8th forum was held in Abu-Dhabi, United Arab Emirates on the 16-20 October 2023.

== Objectives ==
International investors, including foreign direct investment (FDI) by large corporations, or TNCs, can provide a significant source of external finance for many developing countries. Such investment has the potential to contribute to capital accumulation in those countries and provide employment and other benefits, such as the provision of infrastructure and the transfer of technology and management know-how.

However, such outcomes are not automatically guaranteed. Countries increasingly need to align their investment policies with policies in other areas, such as trade and industrial development, to both encourage foreign investors and to ensure that countries reap the development benefits of international investment. The World Investment Forum's mission is to provide a platform where a debate on "investment for development" can take place and ultimately to promote investment flows that contribute to sustainable and inclusive development. With its ties to UN member States, the forum is able to bring together a broad coalition of investment stakeholders at the highest level who can influence the global investment landscape. The WIF has been described by former US President Bill Clinton as "an essential platform for the international community to accelerate investment and encourage sustainable development in … the world's poorest countries".
