= International investment agreement =

Treaty on interstate investments

An international investment agreement (IIA) is a type of treaty between countries that addresses issues relevant to cross-border investments, usually for the purpose of protection, promotion and liberalization of such investments. Most IIAs cover foreign direct investment (FDI) and portfolio investment, but some exclude the latter. Countries concluding IIAs commit themselves to adhere to specific standards on the treatment of foreign investments within their territory. IIAs further define procedures for the resolution of disputes should these commitments not be met. The most common types of IIAs are bilateral investment treaties (BITs) and preferential trade and investment agreements (PTIAs). International taxation agreements and double taxation treaties (DTTs) are also considered IIAs, as taxation commonly has an important impact on foreign investment.

Bilateral investment treaties deal primarily with the admission, treatment and protection of foreign investment. They usually cover investments by enterprises or individuals of one country in the territory of its treaty partner. Preferential trade and investment agreements are treaties among countries on cooperation in economic and trade areas. Usually they cover a broader set of issues and are concluded at bilateral or regional levels. In order to classify as IIAs, PTIAs must include, among other content, specific provisions on foreign investment. International taxation agreements deal primarily with the issue of double taxation in international financial activities (e.g., regulating taxes on income, assets or financial transactions). They are commonly concluded bilaterally, though some agreements also involve a larger number of countries.

== Contents ==
Countries conclude IIAs primarily for the protection and, indirectly, promotion of foreign investment, and increasingly also for the purpose of liberalization of such investment. IIAs offer companies and individuals from contracting parties increased security and certainty under international law when they invest or set up a business in other countries party to the agreement. The reduction of the investment risk flowing from an IIA is meant to encourage companies and individuals to invest in the country that concluded the IIA. Allowing foreign investors to settle disputes with the host country through international arbitration, rather than only the host country's domestic courts, is an important aspect in this context.

Typical provisions found in BITs and PTIAs are clauses on the standards of protection and treatment of foreign investments, usually addressing issues such as fair and equitable treatment, full protection and security, national treatment, and most-favored nation treatment. Provisions on compensation for losses incurred by foreign investors as a result of expropriation or due to war and strife usually also form a core part of such agreements. Most IIAs additionally regulate the cross-border transfer of funds in connection with foreign investments.

Contrary to investment protection, provisions on investment promotion are rarely formally included in IIAs, and if so such provisions usually remain non-binding. Nevertheless, the assumption is that the enhanced protection formally offered to foreign investors through an IIA will encourage and promote cross-border investments. The benefits that increased foreign investment can bring about are important for developing countries that aim at using foreign investment and IIAs as tools to enhance their economic development.

BITs and some PTIAs also include a provision on investor-State dispute settlement. Usually this gives investors the right to submit a case to an international arbitral tribunal when a dispute with the host country arises. Common venues through which arbitration is sought are the International Centre for Settlement of Investment Disputes (ICSID), the United Nations Commission on International Trade Law (UNCITRAL) and the International Chamber of Commerce (ICC).

International taxation agreements deal primarily with the elimination of double taxation, but may in parallel address related issues such as the prevention of tax optimization strategies and tax evasion.

== Types ==
=== Bilateral investment treaties ===
To a large extent, the international legal aspects of the relationship between countries and foreign investors are addressed bilaterally between two countries. The conclusion of BITs has evolved from the second half of the 20th century onwards, and today these agreements constitute a key component of the contemporary international law on foreign investment. The United Nations Conference on Trade and Development (UNCTAD) defines BITs as "agreements between two countries for the reciprocal encouragement, promotion and protection of investments in each other's territories by companies based in either country." While the basic content of BITs has largely remained the same over the years, focusing on investment protection as the core issue, matters reflecting public policy concerns (e.g. health, safety, essential security or environmental protection) have in recent years more frequently been incorporated into BITs.

A typical BIT starts with a preamble that outlines the general intention of the agreement and provisions on its scope of application. This is followed by a definition of key terms, clarifying amongst others the meanings of "investment" and "investor". BITs then address issues related to the admission and establishment of foreign investments, including standards of treatment enjoyed by foreign investors (minimum standard of treatment, fair and equitable treatment, full protection and security, national treatment and most-favored nation treatment). The free transfer of funds across national borders in connection with a foreign investment is usually also regulated in BITs. Moreover, BITs deal with the issue of expropriation or damage to an investment, determining how much and how compensation would be paid to the investor in such a situation. They also specify the degree of protection and compensation that investors should expect in situations of war or civil unrest. Another core element of BITs relates to the settlement of disputes between an investor and the country in which the investment took place. These provisions, often called investor-state dispute settlement provisions, usually mention the forums to which investors can resort for establishing international arbitral tribunals (e.g. ICSID, UNCITRAL or ICC) and how this relates to proceedings in host countries' domestic courts. BITs also typically include a clause on State-State dispute settlement. Finally, BITs usually refer to the time frame of the treaty, clarifying how the agreement is extended and terminated, and specifying to what extent investments conducted prior to conclusion and ratification of the treaty are covered.

=== Preferential trade and investment agreements ===
Preferential Trade and Investment Agreements (PTIAs) are broader economic agreements among countries that are concluded for the purpose of facilitating international trade and the transfer of factors of production across borders. They can be economic integration agreements, free trade agreements (FTAs), economic partnership agreements (EPAs) or similar types of agreements that cover, among many other things, provisions dealing with foreign investment. In PTIAs, the section dealing with foreign investment forms only a small part of the treaty, usually encompassing one or two chapters. Other issues dealt with in PTIAs are trade in goods and services, tariffs and non-tariff barriers, customs procedures, specific provisions pertaining to selected sectors, competition, intellectual property, temporary entry of people, and many more. PTIAs pursue the liberalization of trade and investment in the context of this broader focus. Frequently, the structure and appearance of the respective chapter on foreign investments is similar to a BIT.

There exist many examples of PTIAs. A notable one is the North American Free Trade Agreement (NAFTA). While the NAFTA agreement deals with a very broad set of issues, most importantly cross-border trade between Canada, Mexico and the United States, chapter 11 of this agreement covers detailed provisions on foreign investment similar to those found in BITs. Other examples of PTIAs concluded bilaterally can be found in the EPA between Japan and Singapore, the FTA between the Republic of Korea and Chile, and the FTA between the United States and Australia.

=== International taxation agreements ===
The main purpose of international taxation agreements is to regulate how taxes imposed on the global income of multinational enterprises are distributed among countries. In most cases, this is done through the elimination of double taxation. The core of the problem lies in the disagreements among countries on who has jurisdiction over the taxable income of multinational corporations. Most commonly, such conflicts are addressed through bilateral agreements that deal solely with taxation on income and sometimes also capital. Nevertheless, a few multilateral agreements on taxation as well as bilateral agreements that address taxation together with other issues have also been concluded in the past.

In contemporary treaty practice, avoidance of double taxation is achieved by concurrently applying two separate approaches. The first approach is the elimination of definition mismatches for terms such as "residence" or "income" that could otherwise be a cause of double taxation. The second approach constitutes the relief from double taxation through one of three methods. The credit method allows foreign tax to be credited against the tax paid in the residence country. According to the exemption method, foreign income and resulting taxation is simply disregarded by the residence country. The deduction method taxes income net of foreign tax, but it is rarely applied.

== Trends in international investment rulemaking ==
Historically, the emergence of the international investment framework can be divided into two separate eras. The first era – from 1945 to 1989 – was characterized by disagreements among countries about the degree of protection that international law should offer to foreign investors. While most developed countries argued that foreign investors should be entitled to a minimum standard of treatment in any host economy, developing and socialist countries tended to contend that foreign investors do not need to be treated differently from national firms. In 1959, the first BITs were concluded, and during the following decade, much of the content that forms the basis of a majority of the BITs currently in force were developed and refined. In 1965, the Convention for the Settlement of Investment Disputes Between States and Nationals of Other States was opened to countries for signature. The rationale was to establish ICSID as an institution that facilitates the arbitration of investor-State disputes.

The second era – from 1989 to today – is characterized by a generally more welcoming sentiment towards foreign investment, and a substantial increase in the number of BITs concluded. Amongst others, this growth in BITs was due to the opening up of many developing economies to foreign investment, which hoped that the conclusion of BITs would make them a more attractive destination for foreign companies. The mid-1990s also saw the creation of three multilateral agreements that touched upon investment issues as part of the Uruguay Round of trade negotiations and the creation of the World Trade Organization (WTO). These were the General Agreement on Trade in Services (GATS), the Agreement on Trade-Related Investment Measures (TRIMS), and the Agreement on Trade-Related Aspects of Intellectual Property Rights (TRIPS). In addition, this era saw the growth of PTIAs, such as regional, interregional or plurilateral agreements, as exemplified in the conclusion of the NAFTA in 1992 and the establishment of the ASEAN Framework Agreement on the ASEAN Investment Area in 1998. These agreements typically also began to pursue liberalization of investment more intensively. However, IIAs may be entering a new era as regional agreements, such as the European Union, North American Free Trade Agreement, and dozens of others already in existence or under negotiation are set to supplant traditional bilateral agreements.

Statistics show the rapid expansion of IIAs during the last two decades. By 2007 year-end, the entire number of IIAs had already surpassed 5,500, and increasingly involved the conclusion of PTIAs with a focus beyond investment issues. As the types and contents of IIAs are becoming increasingly diverse and as almost all countries participate in the conclusion of new IIAs, the global IIA system has become extremely complex and hard to see through. Exacerbating this problem has been the shift among many States from a bilateral model of investment agreements to a regional model without fully replacing the existing framework resulting in an increasingly complex and dense web of investment agreements that will surely increasingly contradict and overlap.

Moreover, the number of IIA-based investor-State dispute settlement cases has also been on the rise in recent years. By the end of the year 2008, the total number of known cases reached 317.

Another new development in the global system of IIAs is the increased conclusion of such agreements among developing countries. In the past, industrialized countries usually concluded IIAs to protect their firms when they undertake overseas investments, while developing countries tended to sign IIAs in order to encourage and promote inflows of FDI from industrialized countries. The current trend towards increased conclusions of IIAs among developing countries reflects the economic changes underlying international investment relations. Developing countries and emerging economies are increasingly not only destinations but also significant source countries of FDI flows. In line with their emerging role as outward investors and their improved economic competitiveness, developing countries are increasingly pursuing the dual interests of encouraging FDI inflows but also seeking to protect the investments of their companies abroad.

Another key trend relates to the myriad of different agreements. As a result, the evolving international system of IIAs has been equated with the metaphor of a "spaghetti bowl". According to UNCTAD, the system is universal, as practically every country has signed at least one IIA. At the same time, it can be considered as atomized due to the large number of individual agreements currently in existence. The system is multi-layered, with agreements being signed at all levels (bilateral, sectoral, regional etc.). It is also multi-faceted, as an increasing number of IIAs include provisions on issues traditionally considered only distantly related to investment, such as trade, intellectual property, labor rights and environmental protection. The system is also dynamic, as its key characteristics are currently rapidly evolving. For example, more recent IIAs tend to include provisions addressing issues such as public health, safety, national security or the environment more frequently, with a view to better reflect public policy concerns. Finally, beyond IIAs, there is other international law relevant for countries' domestic investment frameworks, including customary international law, United Nations instruments and the WTO agreement (e.g., TRIMS).

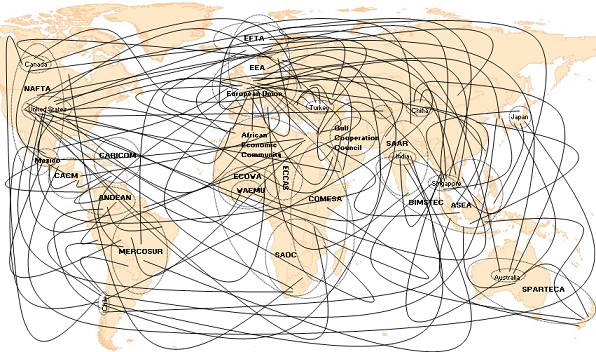
"Spaghetti bowl" of IIAs. Source: UNCTAD

In sum, recent developments have made the system increasingly complex and diverse. Moreover, even to the extent that the principal components of IIAs are similar across most of the agreements, substantial divergences can be found in the details of these provisions. All of this makes managing the interaction among IIAs increasingly challenging for countries, particularly those in the developing world, and also complicates the negotiation of new agreements.

In the past, there have been several initiatives for the establishment of a more multilateral approach to international investment rulemaking. These attempts include the Havana Charter of 1948, the United Nations Draft Code of Conduct on Transnational Corporations in the 1980s, and the Multilateral Agreement on Investment (MAI) of the Organisation for Economic Co-operation and Development (OECD) in the 1990s. None of these initiatives reached successful conclusion, due to disagreements among countries and, in case of the MAI, also in light of strong opposition by civil society groups. Further attempts of advancing the process towards establishment of a multilateral agreement have since been made within the WTO, but also without success. Concerns have been raised regarding the specific objectives that such a multilateral agreement is meant to accomplish, who would benefit in what way from it, and what impact such a multilateral agreement would have on countries' broader public policies, including those related to environmental, social and other issues. Particularly developing countries may require "policy space" to develop their regulatory frameworks, such as in the area of economic or financial policies, and one major concern was that a multilateral agreement on investment would diminish such policy space. As a result, current international investment rulemaking remains short of having a unified system based on a multilateral agreement. In this respect, investment differs for example from trade and finance, as the WTO fulfills the purpose of creating a more unified global system for trade and the International Monetary Fund (IMF) plays a similar role with respect to the international financial system.

== The development dimension ==
By providing additional security and certainty under international law to investors operating in foreign countries, IIAs can encourage companies to invest overseas. While there is a scientific debate on the extent to which IIAs increase the amount of FDI flows to signatory host countries, policymakers do tend to anticipate that IIAs encourage cross-border investment and thereby also support economic development. Amongst others, FDI can facilitate the inflows of capital and technology into host countries, help generate employment and have other positive spillover effects. Accordingly, developing country governments seek to establish an adequate framework to encourage such inflows, amongst others through the conclusion of IIAs.

However, despite this potential to generate pro-development benefits, the evolving complexity of the IIA system may also create challenges. Amongst others, the complexity of today's IIA network makes it difficult for countries to maintain policy coherence. Provisions agreed upon in one IIA may be inconsistent with those included in a different IIA. For developing countries with lower capacity to participate in the global IIA system, this complexity of the IIA framework is particularly hard to manage. Additional challenges arise from the need to ensure consistency between a country's national and international investment laws, and from the objective to design investment policies that best support a county's specific development goals.

Furthermore, even if governments conclude IIAs with general development goals in mind, these agreements themselves usually do not directly deal with problems of economic development. While IIAs rarely contain specific obligations on investment promotion, some include provisions that advocate information exchange about investment opportunities, encourage the use of investment incentives, or suggest the establishment of investment promotion agencies (IPAs). Some also contain provisions that address public policy concerns related to development, such as exceptions related to health or environmental issues, or exceptions related to essential security. Some IIAs also grant countries specific regulatory flexibility, amongst others when it comes to making commitments for investment liberalization.

An additional burden arises from the growing number of investor-State disputes, which are increasingly lodged against governments from developing countries. These disputes are very costly for the affected countries, which have to shoulder substantial expenses for the arbitration procedures, for the payment of lawyer's fees and, most importantly, for the financial compensation to be paid to the investor in case the tribunal decides against the host country. The problem is further exacerbated by inconsistencies in the case law that is emerging from investor-State disputes. Increasingly, tribunals addressing similar cases come to differing interpretations and decisions. This increases the uncertainty among countries and investors about the outcome of a dispute.

One of the key organizations concerned with the development dimension of IIAs is the United Nations Conference on Trade and Development (UNCTAD), which is the key focal point of the United Nations (UN) for dealing with matters related to IIAs and their development dimension. This organization's program on IIAs supports developing countries in their efforts to participate effectively in the complex system of investment rulemaking. UNCTAD offers capacity building services, is widely recognized for its research and policy analysis on IIAs and functions as an important forum for intergovernmental discussions and consensus building on issues related to international investment law and development.

=== Investment Policy Framework for Sustainable Development ===
Within their roles, United Nations Conference on Trade and Development has published the Investment Policy Framework for Sustainable Development(IPFSD) which is a dynamic document created to help governments formulate sound investment policy, especially international investment agreements, that capitalize on foreign direct investment (FDI) for sustainable development. IPFSD intends to promote a new generation of investment agreements by pursuing a broader development agenda; and offer guidance to policymakers when formulating their national and international investment policies. To that end, IPFSD defines eleven critical Core Principles. Flowing from these Core Principles IPFSD provides States guidelines and advice on formulating good investment policy including clause-by-clause options for negotiators to enhance the sustainable development value of domestic investment policies.

The IPFSD proposes clause-by-clause options for negotiators to strengthen the sustainable development aspects of IIAs.

IPFSD also offers an interactive online platform, the Investment Policy Hub, giving stakeholders the opportunity to critically assess policy guidelines and recommend any appropriate changes.

=== International Chamber of Commerce Guidelines for International Investment ===
Similar to UNCTAD's IPFSD, in 2012, the International Chamber of Commerce (ICC) issued its Guidelines for International Investment updating its 1972 recommendations.

The guidelines are "a reaffirmation of the fundamental principles for investment set out by the business community in 1972 as essentials for further economic development." The ICC hopes "that these Guidelines will be useful for investors and governments alike in creating a more enabling environment for cross-border investment and in understanding more clearly their shared responsibilities and opportunities in fulfilling the vast potential of cross-border investment for shared global growth." The 2012 update "retains the proven construct of the 1972 Guidelines, setting forth separately responsibilities of the investor, the home government and the host government." In addition, the update has added an introduction to provide setting and context, and updated or added chapters on labour, fiscal policy, competitive neutrality, and corporate responsibility.

== See also ==
- Free trade agreement
- Double taxation
- Foreign direct investment
- International Centre for Settlement of Investment Disputes (ICSID)
- Preferential trading area
- Tax treaty
- Commercial treaty
- Investor State Dispute Settlement (ISDS)
- Investment Policy Framework for Sustainable Development
- United Nations Conference on Trade and Development
- International Chamber of Commerce
- Sustainable Development
