= Aron Broches =

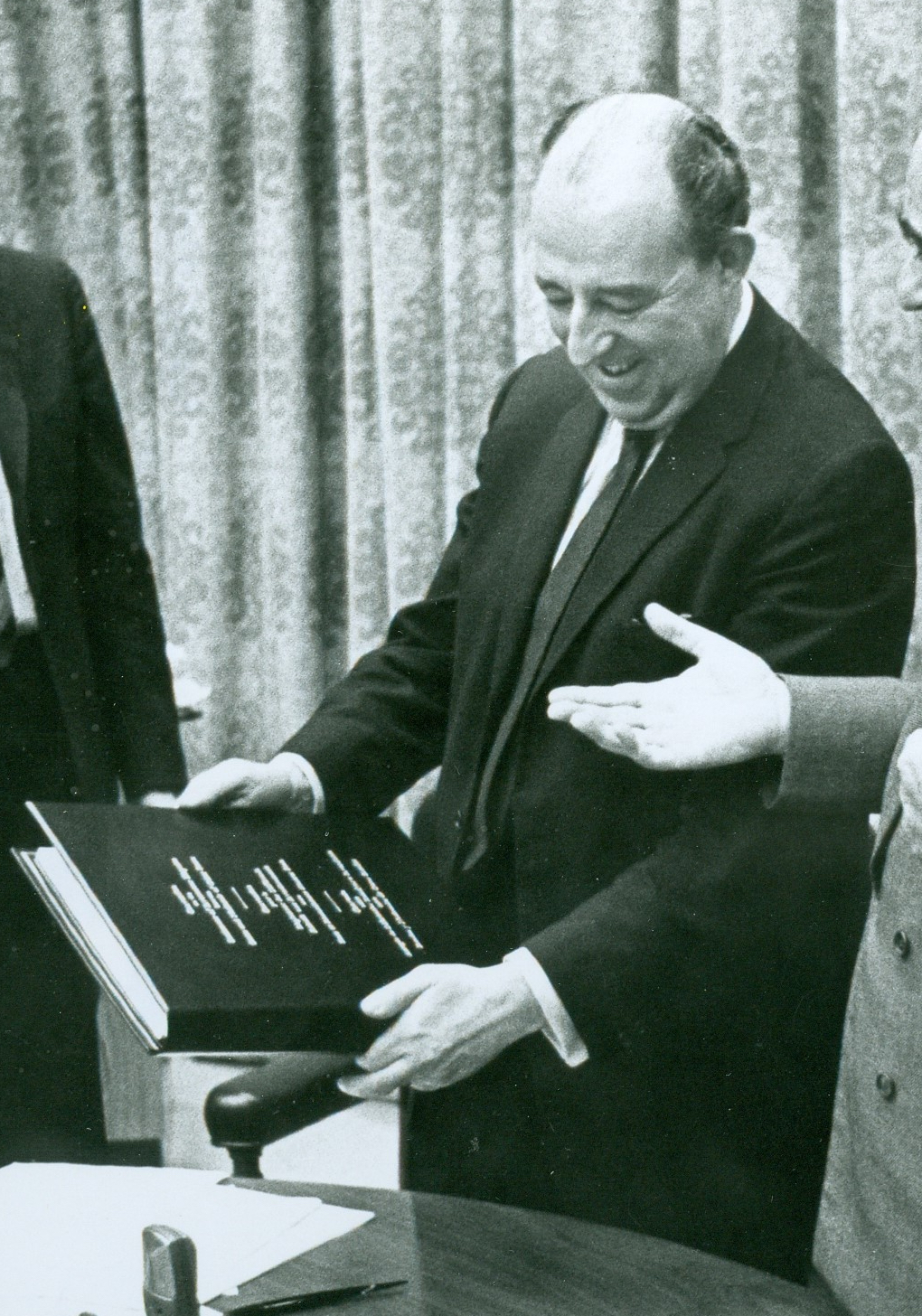
- Aron Broches after the signing of the ICSID Convention.
- Born: 22 March 1914; Amsterdam, the Netherlands
- Died: 9 September 1997 (aged 83); Georgetown University Hospital, Washington, D.C., United States
- Other name: Ronnie

Aron Broches (Yiddish pronunciation: [ˈbʁɔχəs]) was a Dutch legal scholar. He founded the International Centre for the Settlement of Investment Disputes and drafted the centre's founding convention.

== Personal life ==
Broches was born in Amsterdam, on 22 March 1914. His father, Abraham Broches, was an émigré from Mohilev who ran a cigarette factory in Amsterdam. He was made part of the Jewish Council of Amsterdam, and was murdered in Auschwitz on 25 August 1944. His mother, Anna 'Chaja' Broches-Person, immigrated from Romny and was also murdered in Auschwitz, on the same day as her husband.

Aron Broches was the eldest of three children. His brother Elias ('Epi'), who went to school at Amsterdams Lyceum and went on to read classics, was executed by shooting in The Hague on 19 November 1942 for trying to flee the Holocaust in the Netherlands. His sister, Julia, was murdered in Auschwitz on 25 August 1944.

Aron Broches attended the Vossius Gymnasium from 1926 to 1933. After school, he would play the piano and take part in theatre activities.

In April 1939, he entered into ondertrouw with Catherina Johanna 'Kitty' Pothast, whom he would marry on 2 May of the same year. Six weeks later, they emigrated to the United States aboard the Nieuw Amsterdam.

Broches had two children, Alexandra and Paul, and three grandchildren.

Broches was a member of the Cosmos Club. He was appointed commander in the Order of Orange Nassau.

== Career ==
On 18 December 1936, Broches graduated with a Master of Laws degree from the University of Amsterdam. On 6 July 1939, he defended his dissertation Het ondeugdelijke octrooi in de inbreukprocedure, on patent infringement, at the University of Amsterdam.

After arriving in New York, he enrolled at Fordham University School of Law to continue his studies in patent law. He graduated from Fordham with a J.D. in 1942. After graduating, he started working as legal advisor to the Dutch Embassy and Economic Mission in New York and Washington, D.C. In July 1944, through job rotation, he was selected to become the secretary of the Dutch delegation to the Bretton Woods Conference. Johan Beyen, who headed the delegation, quickly made Broches a de facto part of it, and assigned him to the drafting committee of the IMF Articles of Agreement.

In October 1945, Broches returned to the Netherlands. In a few years he rebuilt his deceased father's Broches cigarette factory. During the Second World War, the factory was closed, and all the machinery was stolen by the Nazis. The factory was eventually sold to a larger firm in 1953.

In 1984, 1987 and 1991, he was of counsel to Holzmann, Wise & Shepard.

== Death ==
Broches died on 9 September 1997 in the Georgetown University Hospital in Washington, D.C. Funeral services were held at Temple Sinai in Washington, D.C., on 15 September 1997.
