= ICSID Review =

- Discipline: Law, investment, arbitration, dispute resolution, finance
- Language: English
- Edited by: Meg Kinnear

Publication details
- History: 1986-present
- Publisher: Oxford University Press
- Frequency: Biannually

Standard abbreviations
- ISO 4: ICSID Rev.

Indexing
- ISSN: 0258-3690
- OCLC no.: 13275772

Links
- Journal homepage

The ICSID Review—Foreign Investment Law Journal is a biannual peer-reviewed academic journal covering foreign investment law and international investment dispute settlement. Until 2011 it was published by the Johns Hopkins University Press on behalf of the International Centre for Settlement of Investment Disputes (ICSID), an independent organ within the World Bank Group. From 2012, it is published by Oxford University Press on behalf of ICSID. The journal includes articles, case comments, documents, and book reviews on the law and practice relating to foreign investments as well as the procedural and substantive law governing investment dispute resolution. Its editorial board consists of Meg Kinnear and Campbell McLachlan QC (Co-Editors-in-Chief) and six Associate Editors: Kabir Duggal and Esmé Shirlow (Associate Editors for Case Comments), Gloria Alvarez and Kiran Nasir Gore (Associate Editors for Book Reviews), and Chester Brown and Jeremy Sharpe (Associate Editors for Notes).
