= Franz J. Sedelmayer =

German businessman

Franz J. Sedelmayer is a German entrepreneur and CEO of the US-based WTP LLC. His attempts, through legal proceedings in various jurisdictions, to win compensation for assets expropriated by the Russian state in the 1990s have been covered by the world media. He is the author of “Welcome to Putingrad”, a memoir of his time in Russia and his case against Vladimir Putin and the Russian Federation. To date Sedelmayer is the only one of Russia’s creditors who has actually collected on outstanding debt overriding Russia's claim of sovereign immunity. The Sedelmayer vs. Russian Federation saga, which included approximately 140 different legal proceedings throughout the world is an illustration of the difficulties one might encounter when trying to enforce investment arbitral awards against a state.

== Early life and education ==
Sedelmayer was educated at the Munich International School and later attended the University of Utah. He served in the German armed forces, airborne and signaling, and then worked with the family enterprise, F.X. Sedelmayer jun. Maschinen & Fahrzeugbau in Munich, manufacturers and suppliers of special purpose vehicles, industrial machinery and special operations equipment. Sedelmayer was responsible for export to the Middle East, North and South America.

== Move to Russia, USSR ==
Sedelmayer moved to Russia, USSR in 1989 and became a security consultant to different national and municipal government departments. In 1990, his company, Sedelmayer Group of Companies, entered into an agreement with the Police Department in Leningrad to provide law enforcement equipment and relevant training and established a joint stock company, Kamenny Ostrov Co., for these purposes, in which each held 50%. The Police Department contributed the company's premises as its share of the charter capital, which Sedelmayer renovated to serve as company headquarters, conference and a training center. In 1992 a security service was established predominantly serving foreign entities and the diplomatic corps. During this time Sedelmayer enjoyed good relations with Russian officials, including the future President Vladimir Putin, then the First Deputy Mayor of St Petersburg, with whom he worked on security for the 1994 Goodwill Games. Sedelmayer donated, equipped and trained the FSB's special operations unit "GRAD".

== Expropriation and legal challenges ==
In 1994 a presidential decree of Boris Yeltsin nationalized Sedelmayer's Russian holdings and strong-arm tactics were used to eject him. The Russian Government refused to pay compensation but he pursued his claim at the Arbitration Institute of the Stockholm Chamber of Commerce, under the 1989 Bilateral investment treaty (BIT) between Germany and the USSR. Sedelmayer vs. The Russian Federation resulted in 1998 in the first international arbitration award against Russia. He has continued to seek the ordered compensation through the German and Swedish courts and, despite setbacks and intimidation, has had some high-profile successes.

Sedelmayer sought to impound Lufthansa Airlines' payments to Russia for overflights of Russian airspace. The case went to Germany's highest court but it ruled that Lufthansa would be unfairly harmed because Russia threatened to cancel the overflights. Sedelmayer also filed to seize Russia's value-added-tax refunds in Germany. The courts ruled the funds were protected by diplomatic immunity.

He then discovered that the Russian Federation was the owner of an apartment complex in Cologne that had been used by the KGB. In 2003 he registered his claim for the property to meet the compensation ordered by the Stockholm arbitration. He continued his efforts as the legal process took its course, with unsuccessful efforts to seize Russian state property at the Hannover Trade Fair in 2005. At the 2006 ILA air show in Berlin Sedelmayer's efforts in German courts to seize exhibits led the Russian delegation to flee on a $30-million Tu-204-300 which they believed was under threat.

In 2006 a Cologne court ruled that the Cologne apartment complex should be sold for Sedelmayer's benefit. From 2005 Sedelmayer received regular payments from a court-appointed sequester supervising apartment buildings owned by Russia and leased to the housing authority of Cologne City. By December 2008, the first of numerous public auctions went ahead; Russia was forced to bid for her own buildings and thus ended up paying Sedelmayer.

In July 2011 Sedelmayer won a final Supreme Court ruling in his favour in Stockholm, Sweden, where he has also been pursuing his claims. His victory prompted outrage from the Kremlin, which summoned the Swedish charge d'affaires to protest.

Sedelmayer commented, "Russia is making a very serious mistake as she puts her international image in jeopardy. Because of some two million euros, which kicked the whole thing off, the Russian authorities are putting pressure on the government of Sweden to demonstrate their power. They want to show this power to the Russian population and to many of those, who lost their property in Russia. As a matter of fact, Russia's reaction shows that the country is not safe for those claimants who try to retrieve what they lost as a result of corruption or illegal withdrawal of property."

Eventually in 2014 Sedelmayer received proceeds from compulsory court auctions in Cologne and Stockholm, and thus was finally compensated for the lost properties worth.
