= Churchill Mining =

UK mining corporation

Churchill Mining Plc is a mining corporation from London, United Kingdom. Its main activity is coal mining. It is listed on the Alternative Investment Market (AIM) of the London Stock Exchange since April 2005. David F Quinlivan is the executive chairman of Churchill Mining.

The Supreme Court of Indonesia rejected an appeal by Churchill Mining to get compensation for a coal project that the company says was unfairly seized. Churchill Mining has a significant thermal coal development project located in the East Kutai Regency of Kalimantan, Indonesia. It also is active in Australia. The company wants to be active in coal mining in Kutai National Park, which is a major menace to orangutans.

Churchill appealed to the International Center for Settlement of Investment Disputes, asking $1.3 billion in damages. Indonesia was able to demonstrate that Churchill's licensed were forged, and the ICSID ruled against Churchill.
