= Infinito Gold Ltd. v. Costa Rica =

International investment arbitration case

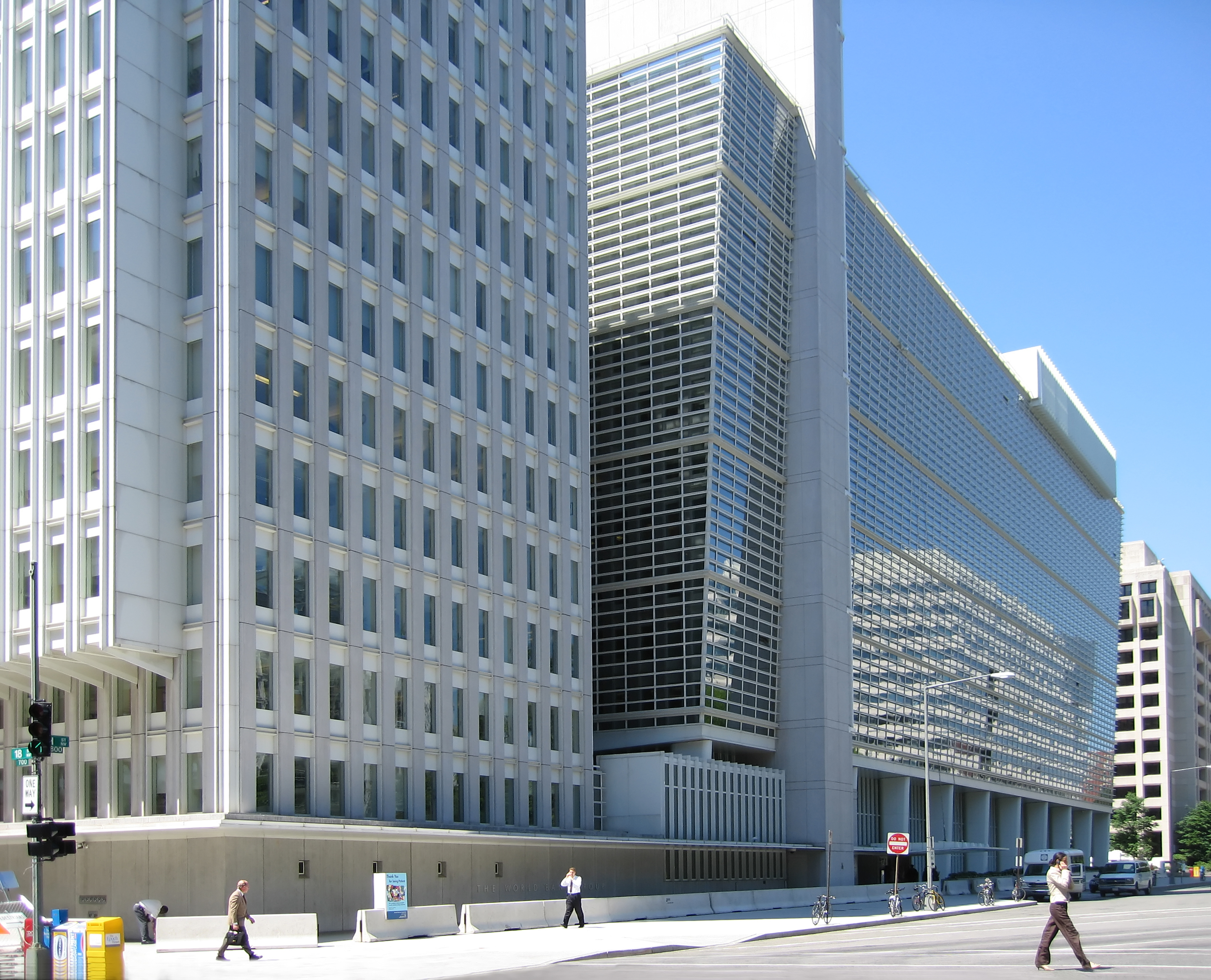
- Headquarters of the ICSID in Washington, D.C. in 2006
- Court: International Centre for Settlement of Investment Disputes
- Full case name: Infinito Gold Ltd. (Claimant) v. Republic of Costa Rica (Respondent)
- Decided: Proceedings registered: March 4, 2014; Final award: June 3, 2021; Discontinuance of annulment: July 15, 2024
- Defendant: Republic of Costa Rica
- Plaintiff: Infinito Gold Ltd.
- Transcript: Award (in Spanish)

Court membership
- Judges sitting: Gabrielle Kaufmann-Kohler; Bernard Hanotiau; Brigitte Stern

Keywords
- environment, environmental impact, mining law, mining

The Infinito Gold Ltd. v. Costa Rica case was an international arbitration proceeding initiated on March 4, 2014, and concluded on July 15, 2024. It consisted of a claim filed by the Canadian mining company Infinito Gold Ltd. (IGFFF) against the Costa Rican State before the International Centre for Settlement of Investment Disputes (ICSID). The proceeding reference was ICSID Case No. ARB/14/5, and the official case name was Infinito Gold Ltd. v. Republic of Costa Rica.

Infinito Gold sued Costa Rica for an amount initially set at US$94 million, but which was ultimately increased to US$400 million. The claim was based on the Agreement between the Government of the Republic of Costa Rica and the Government of Canada for the Promotion and Reciprocal Protection of Investments, signed on March 18, 1998, and which entered into force on September 29, 1999; and the Convention on the Settlement of Investment Disputes between States and Nationals of Other States, which entered into force on October 14, 1966.

The company sought to open an open-pit gold mine in the town of Crucitas de Cutris in the Alajuelan San Carlos canton through its subsidiary, Industrias Infinito Sociedad Anónima. The company obtained an exploration permit and attempted to develop the project. However, in the meantime, Costa Rica adopted policy measures to prohibit open-pit metallic mining. Furthermore, judicial proceedings were initiated in the local jurisdiction to overturn the mining concession granted to the company, alleging the existence of multiple illegalities in the granting of permits.

On June 3, 2021, after seven years of proceedings, the ICSID ruled in favor of Costa Rica and denied Infinito Gold Ltd.'s claims for compensation. It also ordered the parties to bear 50% of the procedure costs and their respective legal fees and other costs.

On October 18, 2021, Infinito Gold filed an application for annulment of the award. The ICSID constituted an ad hoc committee to study it on January 6, 2022. On May 2, the annulment proceeding was suspended due to the company's non-payment of the required advances in accordance with the ICSID Administrative and Financial Regulation, and it was resumed on November 2 once the financial obligations were fulfilled. On July 15, 2024, the ad-hoc committee declared the annulment proceeding closed following a request for discontinuance filed by Infinito Gold.

== Background ==
=== Mining in Costa Rica ===
Mining in Costa Rica became a significant economic activity in the mid-19th century when Costa Ricans sought to penetrate the world market in an attempt to overcome colonial isolation. From then on, this activity, together with non-metallic mining, especially of construction aggregates, sugarcane, tobacco, and coffee, became predominant productive factors for the country.

Costa Rica has significant mineral resources such as calcium carbonate, silica, sulfur, manganese, bauxite, diatomite, iron, silver, and gold, among others. However, open-pit metallic mining has been prohibited since 2010, and only underground metallic mining is permitted. Additionally, the cantons of Abangares, Golfito, and Osa were reserved for subsistence and small-scale mining, according to Law 8904. Within this law, there was a transitory provision that allowed artisanal miners to use mercury in gold recovery until 2019.

Despite the moratorium on open-pit mining for metallic minerals, coupled with the transitory provision on mercury use in gold recovery, there are four regions in the country with activity related to this mineral.

In the Chorotega Region, specifically in Abangares canton, there are five exploration concession applications, three valid exploitation concessions, and one processing plant known as "Planta La Luz". However, none of these are active, and therefore, there are no production reports. Despite the above, there are unofficial data of a total production of 700 kilograms of gold, considering a substantial reduction in active informal miners compared to the previous period, as there is a migration towards the Crucitas sector.

In the Central Pacific Region, specifically in Montes de Oro canton, there are 11 exploration concession applications, two of which are active, in addition to three valid concessions known as "Toyota", "La Unión", and "Bellavista".

In the Central Region 2, specifically in San Ramón canton, the "Mina Moncada" and "Mina Chassoul" have the exploration and exploitation stage enabled; however, only the latter reports the prospecting activities carried out. The plant was inaugurated and started up, reporting good production results in the doré obtained, with average gold and silver contents of 80% and 10% respectively.

Finally, there is the Huetar North Region, which remains active due to the invasion situation in the area that was the subject of the Crucitas project by the company Industrias Infinito. In an updated economic assessment carried out by the sub-director of the Directorate of Geology and Mines together with the regional coordinator, analyzing the affected areas, it was found that other farms were impacted in an effective area close to 11 hectares, and the estimated production exceeds 2400 kilos of gold.

=== Infinito Gold Ltd. ===
Infinito Gold Ltd. is a Canadian mining company engaged in mine exploration and exploitation in Venezuela, Guyana, and Brazil. It also had operations in Nicaragua and attempted to operate the "Crucitas Mine" in Costa Rica through its subsidiary Industrias Infinito S.A.

The company's shareholders were Exploram Enterprises Ltd. and Auro Investments Ltd. Exploram is in turn owned by Coril Holdings Ltd., whose owner is Ronald Mannix, one of the wealthiest men in Canada with a fortune exceeding US$3 billion, and who controlled more than half of Infinito Gold's shares. The board of directors was composed of John Morgan as president and chief executive officer of the company, Steven Dean as chairman of the board, John Thomas as vice president of operations, and John Amundrud, Fred Peschke, and George Chapel as member directors.

In October 2008, the Arias Foundation for Peace and Human Progress of President Óscar Arias Sánchez confirmed to the newspaper La Nación that Mannix had offered to make a donation of US$250,000. The Costa Rican daily revealed the offer only in April 2011, after one of its journalists handed the document from the Foundation confirming the offer to the Attorney General's Office, which led to the opening of a criminal investigation. In July 2019, the case was dismissed by a trial court.

On January 7, 2010, the mining company reported that Exploram Enterprises and Auro Investments had waived for the sixth time the declaration of payment default by the company for over US$50 million in bonds, pending a ruling from the Constitutional Chamber of the Supreme Court of Justice on the mining project in Costa Rica.

On February 12, 2010, Infinito announced the signing of an agreement to continue mining exploration in an area of 25,000 hectares in Nueva Segovia, Nicaragua, located near the Chachagua River. It also announced an investment of nearly US$5 million over 51 months in exploration tasks, social programs, and payments to the concession holder.

On February 20, 2013, the company announced the sale of its mining processing assets in Costa Rica to the Colombian company Zandor Capital S.A. for US$4 million, citing the impossibility of using them in Costa Rica after losing the mining concession due to a ruling by the Administrative Dispute Court of that country. Following the decision to sell its equipment, the Canadian stock exchange announced that Infinito Gold no longer met the TSXV's Tier 1 continued listing requirements, thus downgrading it to Tier 2. Infinito Gold's shares fell from US$1910 on May 19, 2002, to US$0.123 on November 21, 2010, following the first court ruling in Costa Rica that stripped it of its concession.

In December 2014, the company received a loan of US$250,000 from its main shareholder to maintain stability in its financial statements while awaiting an arbitration victory against Costa Rica in international instances. However, in July 2015, Infinito Gold announced it was declaring bankruptcy after its main financier said it would no longer transfer funds to the company, the members of the Board of Directors resigned from their positions, and after recording a deficit of over US$160 million. Erich Rauguth was appointed interim president of the company and reported that the company's sole purpose would be to seek compensation for its failed business in Costa Rica, as they were left with no assets to operate. Rauguth died in Canada on October 20, 2021.

== Crucitas mining project ==
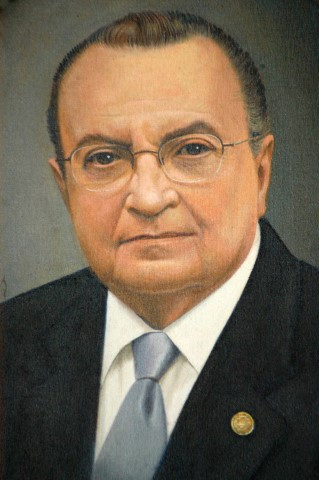
Abel Pacheco de la Espriella.

Industrias Infinito obtained an exploration permit for the Crucitas area in 1993, which was extended until September 18, 1999. Between 1993 and 2000, the company carried out drilling and studies to determine the existence and size of potential gold deposits, conducting a pre-feasibility study in 1996 and, three years later, a feasibility study that demonstrated the existence of gold deposits in a considerable area of Crucitas. On December 13, 1999, the company submitted an application for a mining concession to the Directorate of Geology and Mines of Costa Rica in an area of 10 square kilometers in Cutris, which was granted on December 17, 2001.

On June 12, 2002, a national moratorium on open-pit metallic gold mining came into effect through Executive Decree No. 30477-MINAE, signed by then-President Abel Pacheco de la Espriella. It stipulated that all pending procedures related to mineral exploration and exploitation before the Directorate of Geology and Mines and the National Environmental Technical Secretariat (SETENA) as of the decree's publication date were to be suspended, and that any rights acquired before the decree's publication would be respected. Despite President Pacheco's decree, neither the Ministry of Environment, SETENA, nor the Directorate of Geology and Mines suspended the procedures for granting the environmental viability permit to the company Industrias Infinito.

On November 26, 2004, the Constitutional Chamber of the Supreme Court of Justice upheld a constitutional remedy (recurso de amparo) against the granting of the mining concession, stating that there had been a violation of Article 50 of the Costa Rican Political Constitution because the concession was granted without a prior environmental impact study and because the resolution signed by then-President of the Republic, Miguel Ángel Rodríguez Echeverría, and the Minister of Environment and Energy, Elizabeth Odio Benito, which granted the concession for the exploitation of gold, silver, copper, and associated minerals, was "unconstitutional" due to violation of the precautionary principle and the constitutional right to enjoy a healthy and balanced environment.

The remedy is upheld for violation of Article 50 of the Political Constitution. Consequently, Resolution R-578-2001-MINAE of December 17, 2001, issued by the President of the Republic and the Minister of Environment and Energy, which grants the mining exploitation concession to Industrias Infinito Sociedad Anónima, is annulled, all without prejudice to what the environmental impact study determines. The State is ordered to pay the costs, damages, and losses caused by the events that serve as the basis for this declaration, which will be liquidated in execution of the judgment of the administrative dispute court.

— Constitutional Chamber.

On December 12, 2005, SETENA granted environmental viability to the Crucitas mining project for a total area of 305.90 hectares, a plan for mineral extraction from the surface layer or saprolite in plots of 21 hectares each year until completing six plots, and for a period of 10 years including 18 months of construction, six years of operation, and 18 months for the technical closure of the project. Industrias Infinito intended to process the material in a gravimetric circuit and subsequently proceed to the chemical process through cyanidation tanks in a closed circuit. Their estimate was to produce 4,000 tonnes of material daily to extract 90,000 troy ounces of gold per year (approximately 3,000 kilograms of gold per year).

In late May 2007, the mining company requested that the 2001 resolution granting the exploitation concession for the Crucitas project be validated, indicating that the environmental impact study had already been approved. In December of the same year, it requested SETENA to approve changes to the project regarding the maximum extraction elevation (meters above sea level), which were approved in February 2008.

On April 21, 2008, the Executive Branch ordered the revival of Resolution 578-2001-MINAE, which had been annulled by the Constitutional Chamber, to grant the mining exploitation concession to the company again, despite the moratorium on that activity issued by former President Pacheco de la Espriella being in effect. On June 4, 2008, President Óscar Arias Sánchez and the Minister of Environment and Energy, Roberto Dobles Mora, repealed Decree 30477-MINAE, which had declared the mining moratorium in Costa Rica. Arias Sánchez and Dobles Mora signed Decree 34801-MINAET, published in the official gazette La Gaceta on October 17, 2008, declaring the Crucitas mining project to be "of public interest and national convenience".

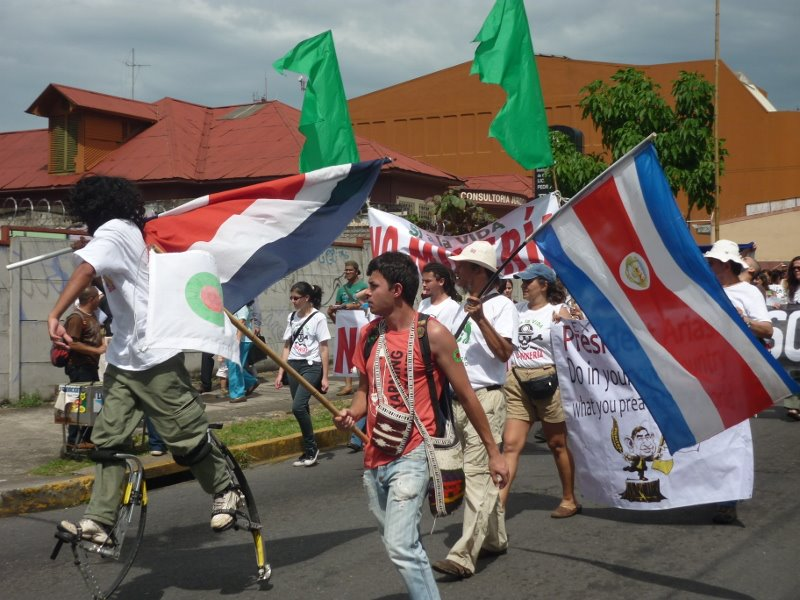
Protesters against Crucitas mining in San José.

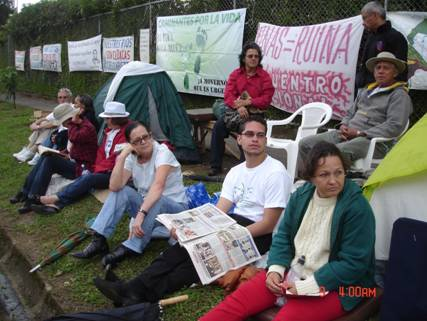
Environmentalists on hunger strike in front of the Presidential House against the mining project.

On October 19, 2008, environmental lawyer Edgardo Araya Sibaja filed a constitutional remedy (recurso de amparo) before the Constitutional Chamber against Industrias Infinito S.A., SETENA, and MINAET, requesting the suspension of tree felling as a precautionary measure, which was granted by that court on October 28. It also ordered the non-application of Decree 34801-MINAET, which had declared the mining project "of public interest and national convenience". The constitutional remedy was finally decided on April 16, 2009, dismissing the claim by a vote of 5 to 2 and ordering the lifting of the precautionary measure.

Following the constitutional court's ruling, on the same day, the Preservationist Association of Flora and Fauna (APREFLOFAS) requested a precautionary measure from the Administrative Dispute Court to order the immediate suspension of the company's activities in the Crucitas mining project. This was granted through Resolution 1377-2010 that evening. The vote ordered the suspension of the effects of Decree 34801-MINAET, including the tree felling permit, the development of infrastructure in protected areas, and undertaking any action or omission tending to ignore or breach what was ordered in that resolution until something different was ordered or a final judgment was issued in the process that would begin in that judicial venue.

The provisional measure was ratified by the processing judge through vote 1476–2010 on April 23, 2010. Although it was appealed to the Court of Appeals, this court confirmed the measure and added some others on June 15, 2010, through ruling 1476–2010.

=== Trial in the Administrative Dispute Court ===
Crucitas Case
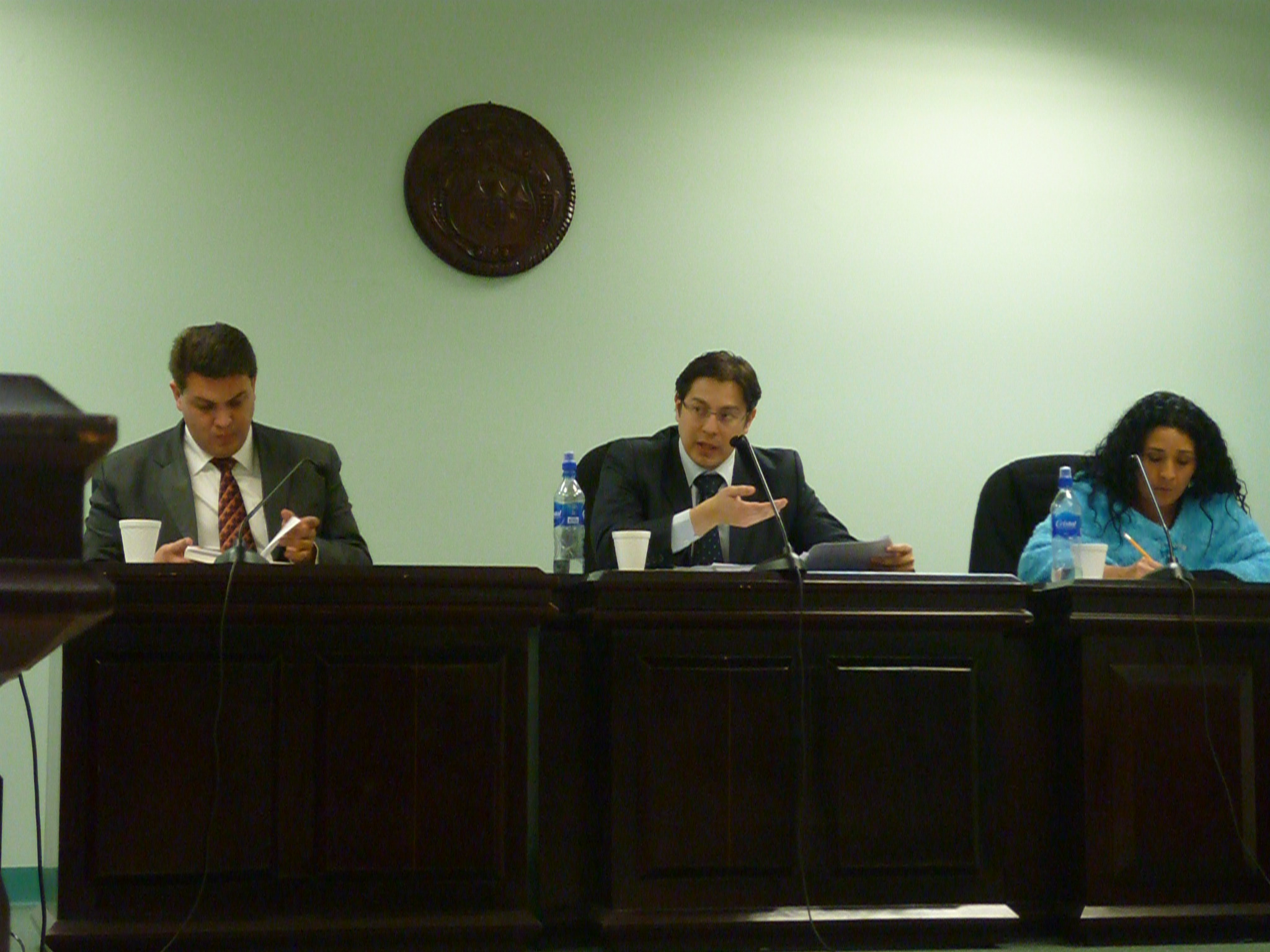
- The panel of judges that deliberated the Crucitas case in the Administrative Dispute Court.
- Court: Administrative Dispute Court
- Full case name: APREFLOFAS and others v. The State, Industrias Infinito Sociedad Anónima, and the National System of Conservation Areas
- Started: April 16, 2010
- Decided: December 14, 2010
- Docket nos.: 08-001282-1027-CA
- Defendants: The State; Industrias Infinito Sociedad Anónima; National System of Conservation Areas
- Plaintiffs: Asociación Preservacionista de Flora y Fauna Silvestre; Jorge Arturo Lobo Segura; Asociación Norte por la Vida
- Transcript: Nexus.PJ

Court membership
- Judges sitting: Eduardo González Segura; David Fallas Redondo; Grace Loaiza Sánchez

Keywords
- environment, environmental impact, mining law, mining

Two lawsuits were filed in the Administrative Dispute Court seeking to annul Decree 34801-MINAET, the resolutions of SETENA and the Ministry of Environment that granted environmental viability, authorized changes to the project, granted the mining exploitation concession for a second time, and granted the tree felling permits. The argument was that these administrative acts had a series of defects, that a number of technical issues were not adequately evaluated, and that consideration in the respective administrative procedures was omitted. On July 20, 2010, the judicial office ordered both proceedings to be joined into a single case file and initiated the processing of the case under number 08-001282-1027-CA. The trial was held from October 4, 2010, to November 22, 2010, and the court, composed of Eduardo González Segura (presiding), David Fallas Redondo, and Grace Loaiza Sánchez, issued the final judgment on December 14, 2010.

Previously, the State, the mining company, the National System of Conservation Areas (SINAC), and the Solidarist Association of Employees of Industrias Infinito S.A. (ASOCRUCITAS) had opposed the lawsuits and raised preliminary defenses of lapse (caducidad), res judicata, and inadmissibility, as well as exceptions of lack of right, lack of active standing (legitimatio ad causam), failure to exhaust administrative remedies, consented act, non-challengeable acts, prescription, lack of right, lack of standing, and lack of interest.

On August 25, 2010, the court rejected the exception of lack of jurisdiction raised. On June 17, August 11, and September 14, 2010, it rejected the preliminary defenses of failure to exhaust administrative remedies, non-challengeable acts, and the exception of material res judicata, in addition to ordering that the preliminary defenses of lapse and prescription be reserved to be considered on the merits. On October 4, 2010, the court partially annulled what had been decided by the processing judge in the hearing on August 11 regarding the acceptance of passive intervention (coadyuvancia) by the corporation Latin American Institute for Human Rights and Social Peace and ordered it excluded from the process. Furthermore, after hearing the representative of ASOCRUCITAS, it accepted that entity as a passive intervenor (coadyuvante pasiva) in the process, which raised exceptions of lack of standing, lack of interest, and lack of right.

In deciding the merits of the case, the court upheld the defense of non-challengeable acts raised by Industrias Infinito only in relation to the official letters issued by the National Institute for Agricultural Innovation and Technology Transfer (INTA), declaring the lawsuit filed by Jorge Lobo Segura inadmissible regarding his claims for annulment of those official letters. Furthermore, it rejected the preliminary defenses of res judicata, lapse, and the so-called "inadmissibility of the action" raised by the State; rejected the preliminary defenses of res judicata, lapse, prescription, consented act, and the part of the defense of non-challengeable acts that was not upheld, raised by Industrias Infinito; rejected the preliminary defenses of res judicata and lapse raised by SINAC; rejected the exceptions of lack of right, lack of active standing, and lack of interest raised by the defendants concerning the claims for nullity of the SETENA, MINAE resolutions and Decree 34801-MINAET; upheld the exception of lack of active standing raised by the State concerning the claim for moral damages filed by APREFLOFAS; and rejected the exceptions of lack of right, lack of active standing, and lack of interest raised by the co-defendants regarding the claims for damages filed by Lobo Segura.

The Court unanimously determined that holding a mining exploration permit did not grant per se the right to an exploitation concession, and that obtaining the latter was subject to complying with legal and regulatory obligations and requirements that had not been followed in this case. According to the judges, since the Constitutional Chamber annulled the exploitation concession in 2004, the company's right was extinguished, and its registration in the Mining Registry should have been eliminated. Therefore, the resolution that revived the exploitation permit for Industrias Infinito on April 21, 2008, was null and void, as the moratorium decree issued by former President Pacheco de la Espriella was still in effect.

Also unanimously, the Court determined that the environmental viability that SETENA delivered to the mining project had lapsed by the time the resolution was issued, so the correct course would have been to issue a new act preceded by an environmental assessment, rather than approving the changes proposed by the company as actually occurred. Given that environmental viability was granted in December 2005, Industrias Infinito should—according to the court—have started extraction work or requested an extension of the viability's validity before the deadline expired, which occurred in December 2007. However, the developer did not do so, meaning the viability had lapsed.

The judges found that the State omitted carrying out a technical and scientific analysis regarding the proposed changes submitted by the mining company, especially regarding the impacts the modifications would produce and the suggested mitigation and compensation measures. Instead, the court noted that the institution merely produced a report that essentially reproduced aspects mentioned by the developing company itself in its proposal, so the institution's resolution authorizing the changes to the project was vitiated by absolute nullity.

Next, the court indicated that there were three reasons why the Executive Branch's resolution reviving the mining exploitation permit in favor of Industrias Infinito was illegal: the act was issued while the moratorium decree issued by President Pacheco de la Espriella was in effect, there was uncertainty about the treatment to be given to the groundwater resource, and it was inappropriate to apply the legal concept of conversion (conversión), as it required that the absence of the element that vitiated the first act be an element proper to the second valid act.

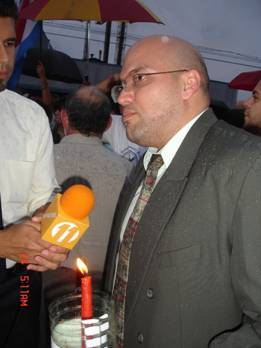
Environmental lawyer Edgardo Araya Sibaja was one of the plaintiffs against the Crucitas project in the Administrative Dispute Court.

Regarding the decree that declared the mining project "of public interest and national convenience," the court determined that it was vitiated by nullity in its motives, as the Executive Branch did not carry out an ordinary administrative procedure to weigh the social benefits against the socio-environmental costs. It also noted that the decree in its reasoning section presented a scarcity of arguments for the magnitude of the project under study, in addition to not referencing documents, studies, expert opinions, or other technical and scientific elements that would support and justify the national convenience of the mine.

Regarding the permit for land use change and authorization to cut trees, the court determined that Resolution 244-2008-SCH issued by the Arenal Huetar Norte Conservation Area had defects in its motive and also constituted an abuse of power (desviación de poder), because, among other things, the list of trees to be cut included species that did not grow in the area and species that do not exist in Costa Rica; instead, it included threatened species and species in danger of extinction. The judges found three faults in the resolution: the omission to take into account the existence of species whose cutting was prohibited by Executive Decree 25700-MINAE, in effect since January 16, 1997, and at the time the act was issued, such as the Santolina chamaecyparissus (cotton lavender), Hymenolobium (a type of tree), and Tachigali costaricensis (tostado); the lack of correct identification of species in the area, so given the uncertainty, the precautionary principle in environmental matters should have been applied and the permit not granted; and because issuing this resolution was based on Decree 34801-MINAET, which had already been declared null in the trial.

Regarding the public road within the mining concession area that was intended to be removed to build a tailings pond, the court determined that this was another ground for nullity. Although it was known that this road existed and would disappear if the project materialized, the respective process of public use removal (desafectación) was not carried out as required by legislation.

The next ground for nullity mentioned by the court related to the depth at which material was intended to be extracted and the impact it would have on a lower aquifer that existed in the area. According to the judges, the Administration and the Constitutional Chamber were misled by the mining company because the terms "depth" and "elevation" (meters above sea level) were intermingled to make it appear that the project would not impact an aquifer, when in fact it would, violating the technical guidelines established for granting permits for the mine.

Industrias Infinito availed itself of the possibility, normatively available, to request modifications to the environmental viability. That is, it used a normative provision to achieve a result not in accordance with the satisfaction of public purposes or the legal order, which this Court considers to constitute a fraud of law. (...) In this sense, it is easy to see how the confusion between the notions of depth and elevation was one of the factors that made it possible to grant environmental viability to the proposed changes to the project, thus bypassing and ignoring the technical limitation established by the Directorate of Geology and Mines since 2001, which consists of limiting extraction to the elevation of seventy-five meters above sea level, which in turn implies intercepting the lower aquifer contrary to the technical provisions of the aforementioned Directorate. And Industrias Infinito's intention to mislead the Administration on the subject is made even more evident considering that the interception of the lower aquifer was essential for the development of the Crucitas mining project, as the water derived from said interception would be available. This water would be pumped to the tailings pond (which is an indispensable component of the project), and, furthermore, it was envisioned that with the interception of this lower aquifer, once extraction was finished, the water would allow the creation of a lake (the so-called Lake Fortuna), which was presented as one of the positive legacies that the mining project would leave, and it was even announced that the community could exploit the new lake.

— Administrative Dispute Court.

Further grounds for nullity listed by the court included the absence of a technical analysis by the administration when evaluating the proposed changes; the use of explosives in the project (a use initially ruled out by the company); the omission of an analysis of studies regarding the impact and mitigation measures when destroying cyanide; the existence of contradictory technical and scientific criteria regarding the dangers the tailings pond posed to the environment and human activity; the lack of reasoning and motive when assessing the social component of the project; and an inadequate determination of the project's cost-benefit balance, as well as the absence of a stamp, signature of a chemical engineer, and approval from the Colegio de Ingenieros Químicos de Costa Rica for the process flow diagrams submitted to SETENA.

For all the above reasons, the Administrative Dispute Court partially upheld the lawsuits filed and declared null and void Resolutions 3638-2005-SETENA, 170-2008-SETENA, R-217-2008-MINAE, 244-2008-SCH, and Decree 34801-MINAET. It ordered Industrias Infinito Sociedad Anónima, the State, and the National System of Conservation Areas to provide comprehensive reparation for the environmental damage caused by the clear-cutting carried out on the developer's properties. It ordered the National Mining Registry to cancel the concession in favor of Industrias Infinito and to communicate the judgment to the Ministry of Environment, Energy, and Telecommunications so that it could initiate administrative sanctioning proceedings against its officials Eduardo Murillo Marchena, José Francisco Castro Muñoz, and Cynthia Cavallini Chinchilla. It also ordered the judgment be communicated to the Public Ministry to determine whether it was appropriate to pursue criminal proceedings against Óscar Arias Sánchez, Roberto Dobles Mora, Sonia Espinoza Valverde, Sandra Arredondo Li, Arnoldo Rudín Arias, Murillo Marchena, Castro Muñoz, and Cavallini Chinchilla.

The judgment was subject to multiple appeals in higher courts, reaching cassation before the First Chamber of the Supreme Court of Justice, which reaffirmed the original ruling in all its aspects in November 2011 and February 2012.

Industrias Infinito left Crucitas on September 10, 2015. In November of that year, based on an expert report, the Administrative Dispute Court ordered the developer, SINAC, and the State to pay US$6.4 million for environmental damage within six months.

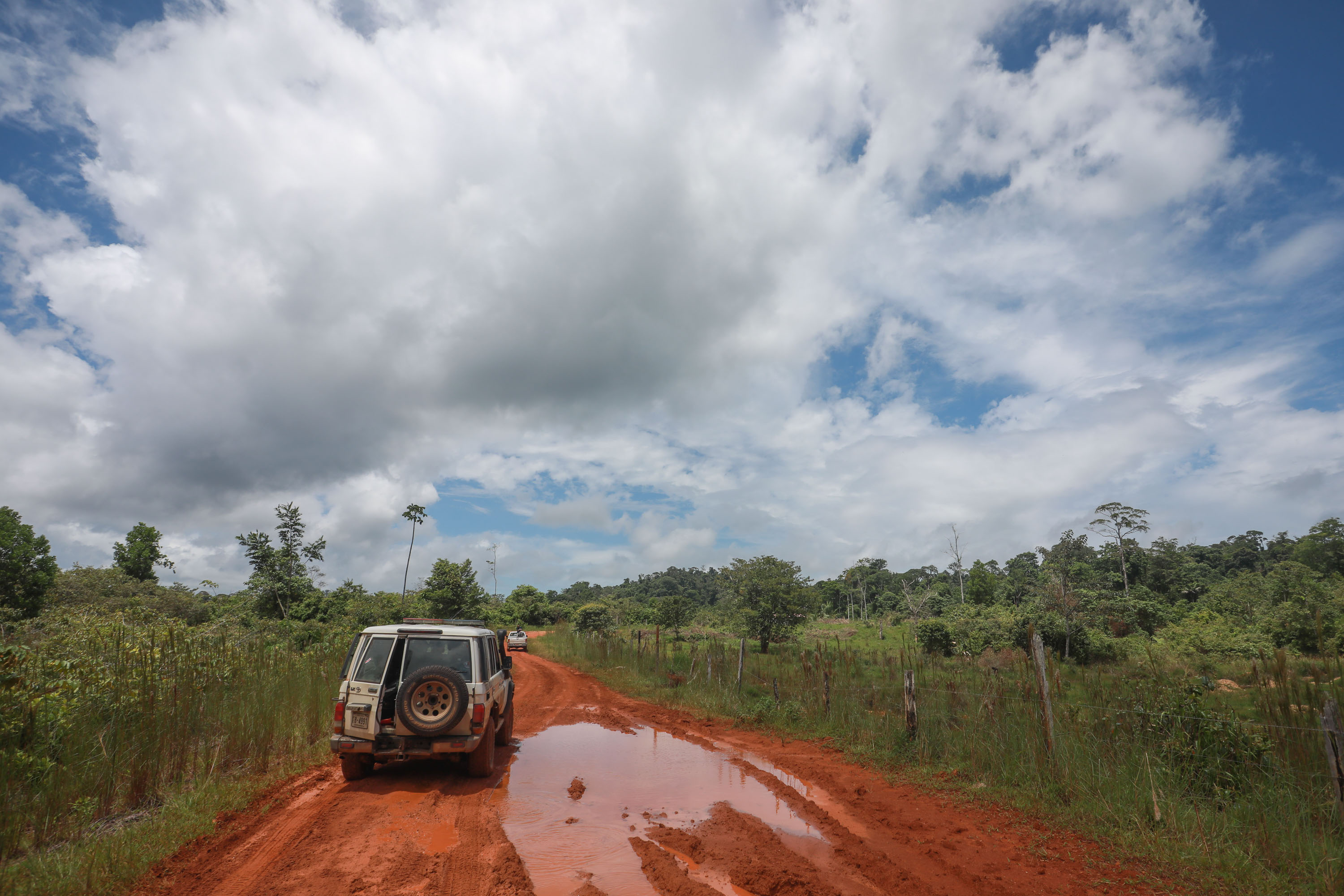
Vehicle of Costa Rican police forces on the road leading to the failed Crucitas Mine.

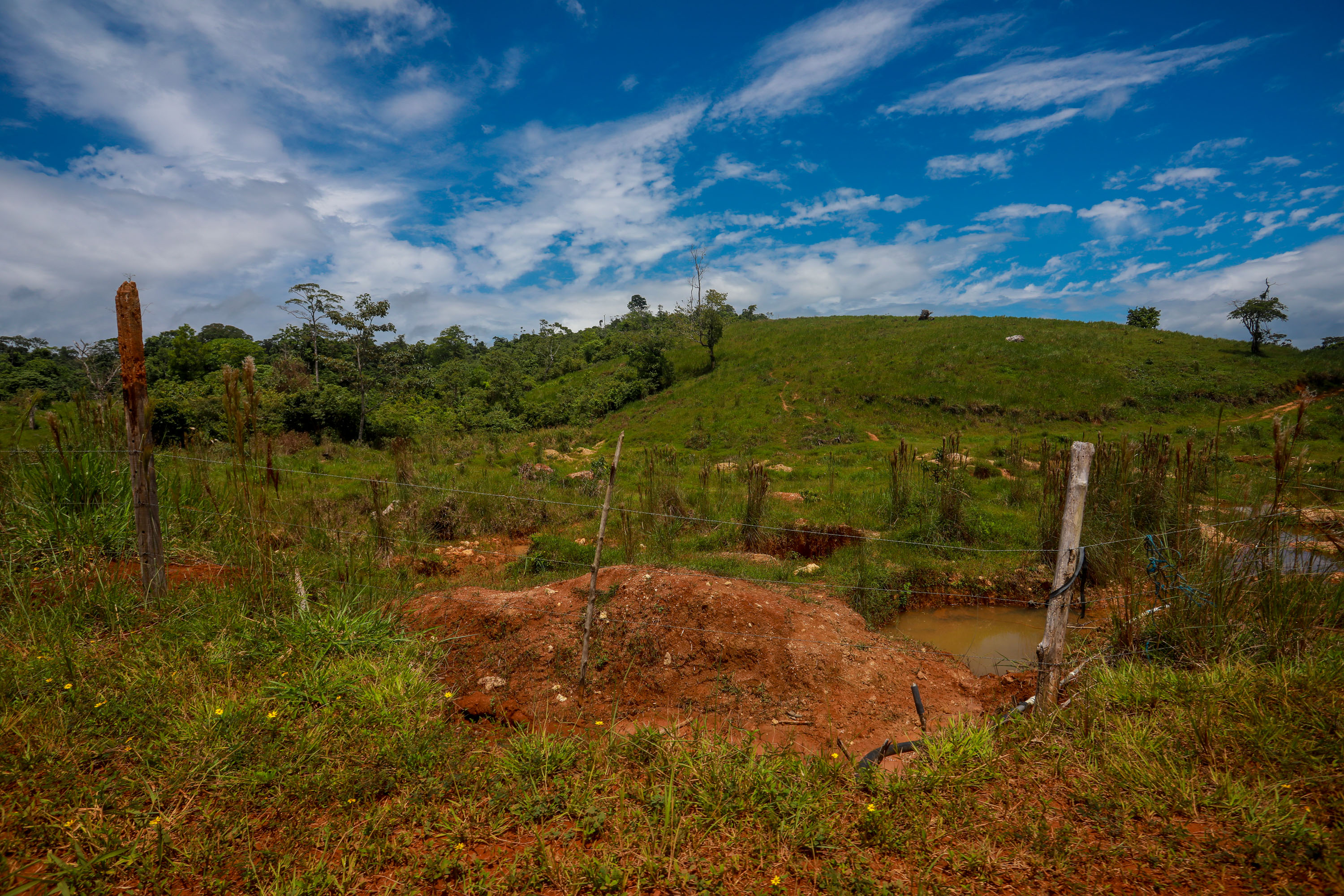
Land of the failed Crucitas mine.

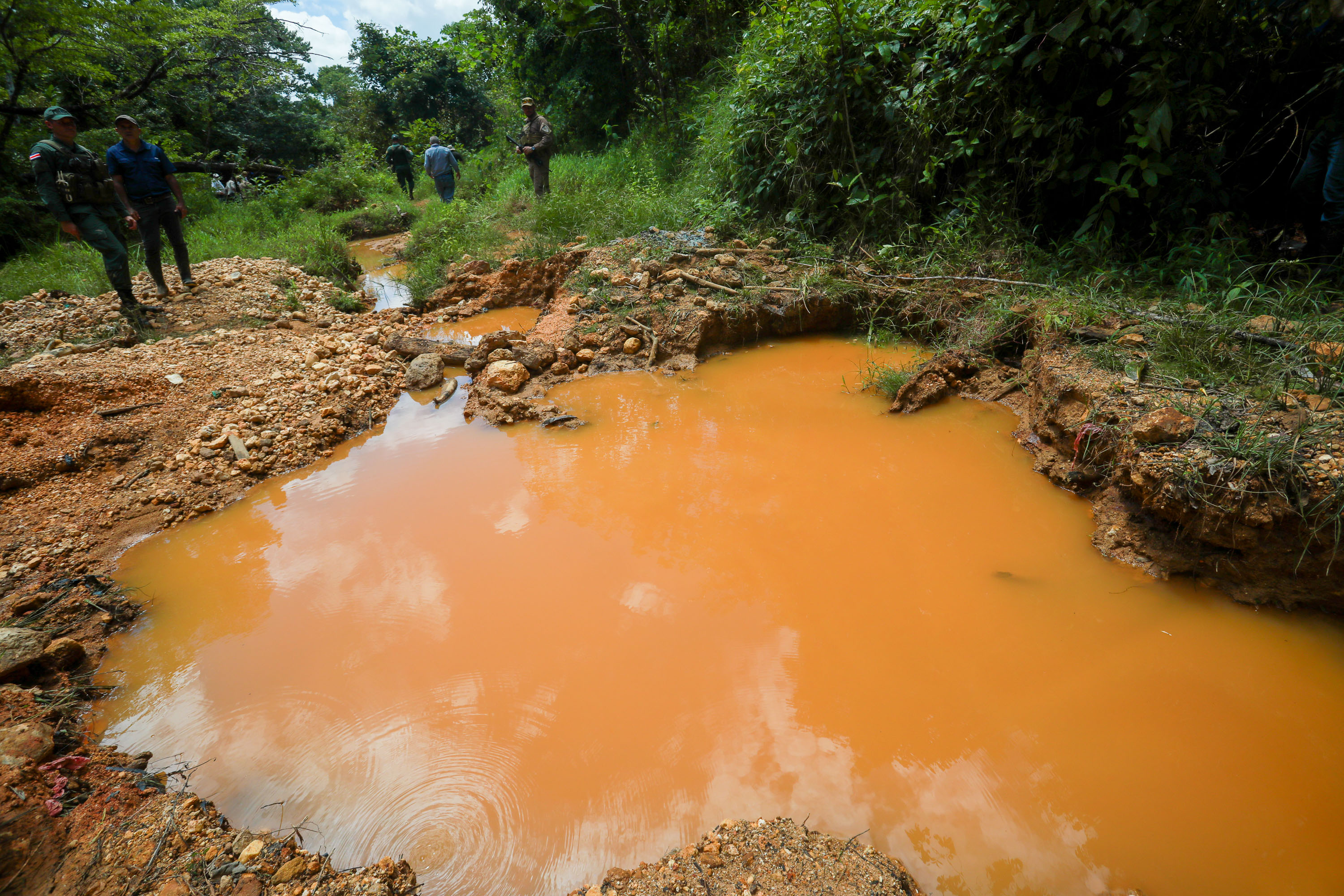
Artificial lagoon for illegal gold extraction in Crucitas.

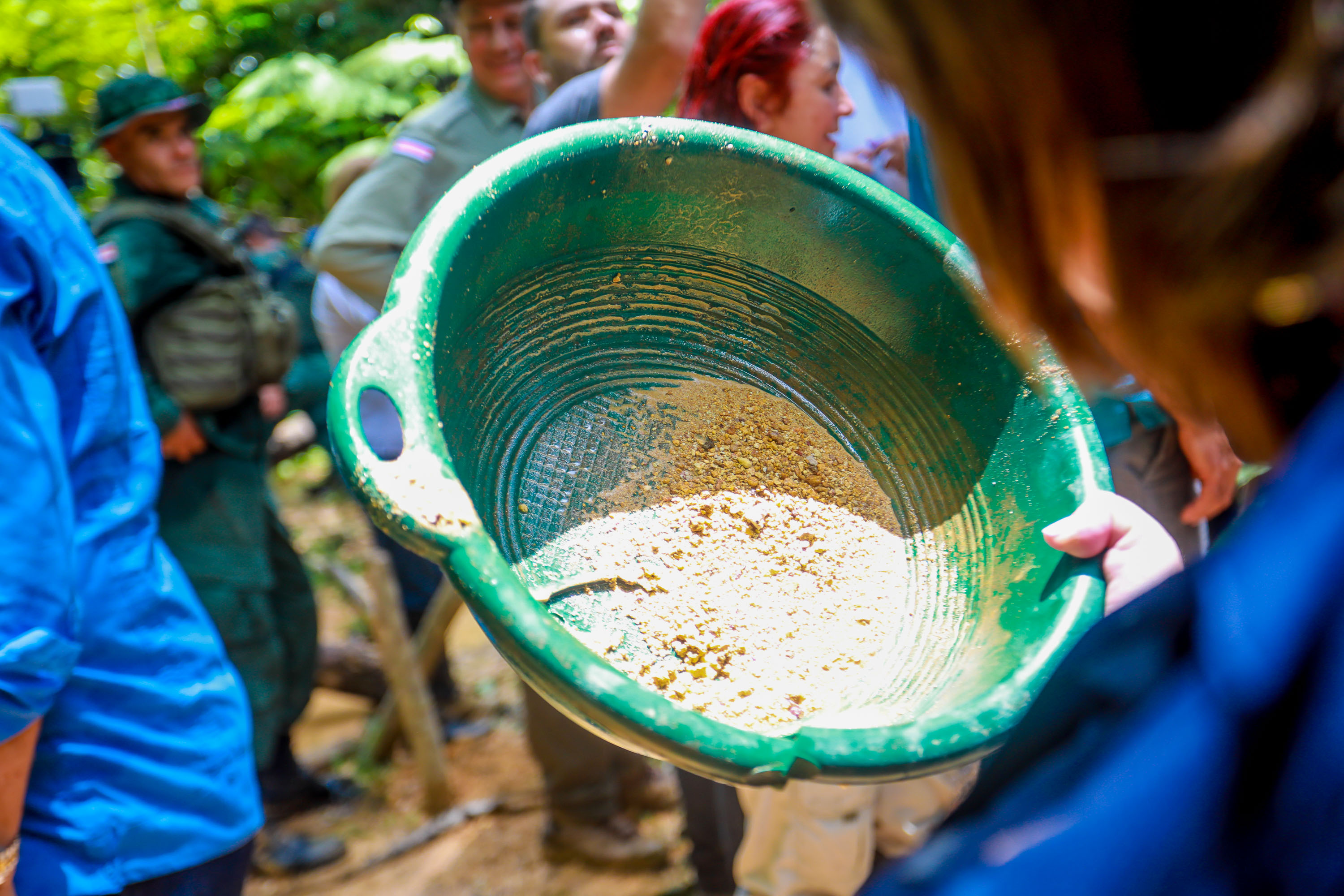
Basket for filtering solids and extracting gold used illegally in Crucitas.

== ICSID Case ==
Infinito Gold Ltd. sued Costa Rica before the International Centre for Settlement of Investment Disputes (ICSID) on March 4, 2014, claiming US$400 million for the Costa Rican State's alleged breach of the Agreement between the Government of the Republic of Costa Rica and the Government of Canada for the Promotion and Reciprocal Protection of Investments, signed on March 18, 1998, and which entered into force on September 29, 1999; and of the Convention on the Settlement of Investment Disputes between States and Nationals of Other States, which entered into force on October 14, 1966.

The tribunal was constituted on September 29, 2014. The parties selected the Swiss arbitrator Gabrielle Kaufmann-Kohler; the claimant selected the Belgian arbitrator Bernard Hanotiau; and the respondent selected the French arbitrator Brigitte Stern.

The ICSID held hearings on the merits of the case from July 22 to 25, 2019, at its offices in Washington, D.C. The State's preliminary objections were rejected by the ICSID, except for three that were deferred for consideration on the merits: whether the mining company's investment complied with Costa Rican legislation; whether the tribunal lacked jurisdiction ratione temporis because the claims were time-barred; and whether the developer could invoke the "most-favored-nation" clause to "avoid" jurisdictional defects in the case.

In its analysis of the merits, the tribunal determined by majority that the claims were not time-barred and that Costa Rica had violated its obligation of fair and equitable treatment by enacting the 2011 law that declared a total moratorium on open-pit metallic mining in the country, and as an ancillary measure, by the Ministry of Environment, Energy, and Telecommunications' 2012 resolution implementing that prohibition. In the opinion of two of the three arbitrators, this deprived Industrias Infinito of the opportunity to apply for a new exploitation concession.

Despite this circumstance, the tribunal noted that it experienced difficulties in identifying the damage that the legislative moratorium might have caused. Without the 2011 legislative prohibition and the 2012 MINAET resolution, Industrias Infinito would have returned to the situation of holding an exploration permit with an application for an exploitation concession pending. However, the 2010 executive decree moratorium issued by President Pacheco de la Espriella would still be in effect, which would have prevented the developer from obtaining the exploitation permit. Given that the moratorium decree was issued in 2010 (before the cut-off date for facts analyzed by the ICSID), any claims regarding that decree were time-barred.

The two arbitrators constituting the majority on this aspect of the award indicated that even if the developer had proven the existence of the damage caused, it would not entitle it to compensation, as the possibility of applying for the exploitation concession was no guarantee that it would be received. Therefore, any calculation of damages was uncertain and highly speculative.

The tribunal agreed with Industrias Infinito that its shares lost value when the 2010 Administrative Dispute Court ruling, ratified by the First Chamber of the Supreme Court in 2011, annulled the 2008 concession. However, it agreed with Costa Rica that this did not mean, as a matter of law, that the decision caused a substantial deprivation of the company's value, as the value of its shares was based on the illusion of holding valid mining rights when they were not valid.

The Administrative Chamber concluded that the 2008 Concession was vitiated by a legal defect that rendered it null ab initio. This means that the 2011 Administrative Chamber Judgment merely confirmed that legal status. If this decision had been taken in bad faith, with the purpose of depriving Industrias Infinito of a concession whose ownership was valid, it would have been open for the Tribunal to assess whether it had an expropriatory character. However, this is not the case here: as discussed in Section VI.C.2.c supra, the 2011 Administrative Chamber Judgment cannot be characterized as a denial of justice, nor was it fundamentally arbitrary or unjust. It constituted a good faith decision by the Supreme Court of Justice of Costa Rica which concluded that Industrias Infinito had no valid rights under Costa Rican law. Consequently, it cannot be characterized as an expropriatory measure. In other words, the value of Industrias Infinito's shares and other intangibles was based on an illusion, i.e., that the mining rights were valid when they were not. In reality, the Claimant's shares in Industrias Infinito were already worthless prior to the challenged measures, which therefore cannot have caused their loss of value.

— ICSID.

The arbitrators also determined that the developing company did not have the right to invoke the "most-favored-nation" clause because the 2002 and 2008 concessions were granted in violation of Costa Rican domestic law, rendering its compensation claims on that point null.

Likewise, the tribunal rejected Industrias Infinito's claim to be exempted from paying for the environmental damage caused in Crucitas by virtue of the Agreement between the Government of the Republic of Costa Rica and the Government of Canada for the Promotion and Reciprocal Protection of Investments, as that treaty preserved Costa Rica's right to issue domestic regulations.

=== Operative Part of the Award ===
The ICSID ruled in this case that:

- It had jurisdiction to decide on the claims raised and that, except for the claim relating to the 2019 restart of the proceedings for the collection of environmental damages before the Administrative Dispute Court of Costa Rica, the claims were admissible.
- Costa Rica violated its obligation to grant fair and equitable treatment to the developing company, in accordance with Article II(2)(a) of the Agreement between the Government of the Republic of Costa Rica and the Government of Canada for the Promotion and Reciprocal Protection of Investments.
- It could not grant compensation to the claimant for the damages caused by this breach.
- Each party was to bear 50% of the procedure costs and their respective legal fees and other costs.
- All remaining claims and petitions were dismissed.

=== Separate Opinion of Arbitrator Brigitte Stern ===
The French arbitrator Brigitte Stern issued a separate opinion regarding the tribunal's jurisdiction and the merits of the decision, stating that she would have arrived at the same general conclusion regarding the dispute under examination but by a different path.

Stern's main disagreement was the existence of jurisdiction ratione temporis. In her opinion, according to the limitation period provided for in the Agreement between the Government of the Republic of Costa Rica and the Government of Canada for the Promotion and Reciprocal Protection of Investments, the ICSID had no jurisdiction over the claims filed by the company. The cut-off date for facts under analysis was February 6, 2011, and Industrias Infinito submitted five measures for the tribunal's consideration after that deadline: the 2011 judgment of the First Chamber of the Supreme Court of Justice ratifying the 2010 Administrative Dispute Court judgment; the 2011 legislative prohibition on open-pit metallic mining that came into effect in February of that year; the Ministry of Environment, Energy, and Telecommunications' resolution of January 9, 2012, implementing the aforementioned law; and the restart of proceedings in the Administrative Dispute Court for the collection of environmental damages in February 2019.

Stern argued that the confirmation of the Administrative Dispute Court's judgment by the Cassation Chamber meant that the content of the former should be considered as existing from the date of its adoption. Because the Administrative Dispute Court's judgment was not identified in the majority vote as a cause for Costa Rica's breach of its international obligations, the country had not committed a fault, and therefore the ICSID had no jurisdiction.

=== Application for Annulment ===
On October 18, 2021, Infinito Gold filed an application for annulment of the award. The ICSID constituted an ad hoc committee to study it on January 6, 2022, composed of the American Brian King (president), José Antonio Moreno Rodríguez from Paraguay, and the Spanish Deva Villanúa Gómez.

On May 2, the proceeding was suspended because Infinito Gold failed to pay the required advances in accordance with Rule 14, Section Three, paragraphs d) and e) of the ICSID Administrative and Financial Regulation. The payment in question was made on November 2, 2022, so the ICSID reported that it was resuming its analysis of the company's application.

On May 29, 2023, Infinito Gold submitted its memorial on annulment, requesting that paragraph 799(d) be set aside, in which the arbitral tribunal determined that it could not grant compensation for damages arising from Costa Rica's breach of fair and equitable treatment to the company, as well as paragraphs 582 to 586, relating to the arbitrators' analysis of damages and their decision not to grant compensation. Costa Rica responded negatively on November 20, 2023, and Infinito responded again on February 20, 2024. Costa Rica presented its final arguments on May 22, 2024. However, on June 14, both parties submitted a request for discontinuance of the proceeding in accordance with Rules 53 and 43(1) of the arbitration rules. This request was granted on July 15, concluding the proceeding.

== Notes ==
- This article has partially incorporated content from the website of the Directorate of Geology and Mines of Costa Rica, specifically from this version dated January 27, 2022, published under the Creative Commons Attribution 4.0 International License.

== Bibliography ==
- ICSID (2021). "Laudo - Caso CIADI No. ARB/14/5" [Award - ICSID Case No. ARB/14/5] (PDF). International Centre for Settlement of Investment Disputes. Archived from the original (pdf) on 12 June 2021.
- Administrative Dispute Court Section IV (2010). "Caso Crucitas | Resolución n.º 04399-2010" [Crucitas Case | Resolution No. 04399-2010]. Nexus.PJ. Archived from the original (pdf) on 23 February 2022.
- Seers, Myriam (2021). "CLAIMANT'S APPLICATION FOR PARTIAL ANNULMENT" (PDF). jusmundi.com. Archived from the original (pdf) on 4 September 2023.
