= Investment Policy Framework for Sustainable Development =

- Available in: Official languages of the United Nations
- Creator: United Nations Conference on Trade and Development
- Website: Investment Policy Hub
- Launched: July 2012

The Investment Policy Framework for Sustainable Development (IPFSD) is a dynamic document created to help governments formulate sound investment policy, especially international investment agreements (IIAs), that capitalize on foreign direct investment (FDI) for sustainable development. It was prepared by the Division on Investment and Enterprise (DIAE) of the United Nations Conference on Trade and Development (UNCTAD).

IPFSD is not a negotiated text or undertaking between States; but rather an initiative by the UNCTAD Secretariat that represents expert guidance while leaving domestic policy makers free to adapt and adopt. IPFSD is the result of numerous consultations with experts and is intended as a platform to provide for further consultation and discussion with all investment stakeholders. The main objective of the IPFSD is to create a balance between the rights and obligations of States and investors while maintaining attractive investment environments.

In the face of persistent global economic and social challenges, UNCTAD's IPFSD intends to:

- Promote a new generation of investment agreements by pursuing a broader development agenda; and
- Offer guidance to policymakers when formulating their national and international investment policies.

To that end, IPFSD defines eleven critical core principles. Flowing from these core principles IPFSD provides States guidelines and advice on formulating good investment policy including clause-by-clause options for negotiators to enhance the sustainable development value of domestic investment policies.

== History ==
IPFSD has grown out of a long precedent of UN Member States calling for sustainable economic development, an understanding that investment is a critical aspect of sustainable development, and UNCTAD's three-and-a-half decades of experience in research and policy analysis.

The UN Charter promotes, inter alia, the goal of economic and social progress. The UN Millennium Development Goals (MDGs) call for a Global Partnership for Development. In particular, Goal 8 encourages the further development of an open, rule-based, predictable, non-discriminatory trading and financial system, which includes a commitment to good governance, development, and poverty reduction, both nationally and internationally- concepts that apply equally to the investment system. The “Monterrey Consensus” of the UN Conference on Financing for Development 2002, acknowledges that countries need to continue their efforts to achieve a transparent, stable and predictable investment climate. The UN Johannesburg Plan of Implementation of September 2002, following up on the Rio Declaration, calls for the formulation and elaboration of national strategies for sustainable development, which integrate economic, social and environmental aspects. The 4th UN Conference on Least Developed Countries (LDCs) in May 2011 adopted the Istanbul Programme of Action with a strong focus on productive capacity building and structural transformation as core elements to achieve more robust, balanced, equitable, and inclusive sustainable development. Finally, the 2012 UNCTAD XIII Conference recognized the role of FDI in sustainable development and inclusive growth.

Several other international instruments inspired the core principles that make up the IPFSD. They comprise, in particular, the Universal Declaration of Human Rights and the UN Guiding Principles on Business and Human Rights, the Convention on the Establishment of the Multilateral Investment Guarantee Agency, the World Bank Guidelines, the UN Global Compact and the ILO Tripartite Declaration of Principles concerning Multinational Enterprises and social policy and several WTO-related agreements, including the General Agreement on Trade in Services, the TRIMs Agreement and the Agreement on Government Procurement.

== Structure and components of the IPFSD ==

The IPFSD consists of eleven core principles which aim to guide the investment policy underlying IIAs. Flowing from these core principles, the IPFSD provides states guidelines and advice on formulating good investment policies. The IPFSD proposes clause-by-clause options for negotiators to strengthen the sustainable development aspects of IIAs.

IPFSD also offers an interactive online platform giving stakeholders the opportunity to critically assess policy guidelines and recommend any appropriate changes.

=== The core principles ===
The eleven core principles of the IPFSD are:

1. Investment for sustainable development
2. Policy coherence
3. Public governance and institutions
4. Dynamic policymaking
5. Balanced rights and obligations
6. Right to regulate
7. Openness to investment
8. Investment protection and treatment
9. Investment promotion and facilitation
10. Corporate governance and responsibility
11. International cooperation

=== National investment policy: guidelines ===
The national investment policy guidelines translate the core principles for investment policy making into concrete guidelines at the national level, with a view to addressing specific policy changes. These guidelines are designed to ensure that investment policy is coherent with the overarching development strategy of countries, enhance the sustainable development impact of investment and promote responsible investment. The guidelines further aim to balance maximizing sustainable development outcomes while maintaining an attractive investment climate. The national investment policy guidelines targets policy action at three levels:

- Strategic – policymakers should ground investment policy in a broad roadmap for economic growth and sustainable development, such as those set out in formal economic or industrial development strategies in many countries.
- Normative – by setting rules and regulations on investment and in a range of other policy areas, policymakers can promote and regulate investment that is geared towards sustainable development goals.
- Administrative – through appropriate implementation and institutional mechanisms, policymakers can ensure continued relevance and effectiveness of investment policies.

=== International investment agreements (IIAs): policy options ===
The IPFSD aims to translate the core principles into concrete options for policymakers with a view to addressing today’s investment challenges by providing examples of how to draft IIAs that address sustainable development by strengthening development dimensions of IIAs, balancing the rights and obligations of States and investors, and managing the systematic complexity of the IIA regime. International investment policy must be addressed at three levels.

- Strategic – this involves managing the interaction between IIAs and national policies, and those between IIAs and other international agreements e.g. human rights obligations. The overall objective is to ensure coherence between IIAs and sustainable development goals.
- Designing provisions for sustainable development– this concerns addressing the policy space and balancing rights and obligations between States and investors, and effective investment promotion.
- Building multilateral consensus on investment policy – this goes toward helping address the systemic challenges that emerge from overlaps and inconsistencies in the IIA regime.

The IPFSD suggests, clause-by-clause, how the IPFSD's core principles can be converted into concrete provisions in an IIA. Governments can choose from these explicit policy options those that best suit their countries’ levels of development and respective policy objectives. Among others these include: adjustments of existing IIA provisions(e.g. making them more sustainable development-friendly through formulations that safeguard policy space and limit State liability); new provisions in IIAs (e.g. to balance investor rights and responsibilities and to promote responsible investment); and the introduction of Special and Differential Treatment (SDT) (e.g. clauses for less-developed Parties to calibrate the level of obligations to the country’s level of development).

Some specific clause-level recommendations include:

- Narrowing the scope-and-definition clause to exclude portfolio, short-term or speculative investments from treaty coverage;
- Formulating the fair and equitable treatment (FET) clause as an exhaustive list of State obligations (e.g. not to (i) deny justice; (ii) treat investors in a manifestly arbitrary manner; (iii) flagrantly violate due process);
- Clarifying the distinction between legitimate regulatory activity and regulatory takings giving rise to compensation (i.e. indirect expropriations);
- Limiting the Full Protection and Security (FPS) clause to establish that "physical" security and protection will only commensurate with the country's level of development;
- Limiting the scope of the transfer-of-funds clause by providing an exhaustive list of covered payments/transfers, including exceptions triggered by serious balance-of-payment difficulties, and stipulating that the investor's transfer rights are contingent on its compliance with the host State's fiscal and other transfer-related obligations;
- Including exceptions to protect human rights, health, core labour standards and the environment, along with a check-and-balance system that ensures there is enough policy space while avoiding abuse; and
- Including clauses designed to eliminate or make investor-state dispute settlement (ISDS) the last resort (e.g. after the investor's exhaustion of local remedies and use of Alternative Dispute Resolution mechanisms).

== The new generation of investment policies ==
The IPFSD seeks to give investment policy a more prominent place in development strategies. Emerging challenges and trends make it necessary to review these guidelines.

== Dynamic nature of IPFSD and The Investment Policy Hub ==
IPFSD has been designed with the intention of providing immediate technical assistance for the negotiation of investment agreements, while maintaining a dialog between investment policy stakeholders including the international development community, investors, business associations, labor unions, relevant NGOs and interest groups. The result of these ongoing multi-stakeholder consultations will be a dynamic document.

To that end, in concert with IPFSD, UNCTAD has provided a platform for further consultation and discussion with all investment stakeholders—the Investment Policy Hub which allows investment stakeholders to post comments regarding the content of the IPFSD. The combination then, of IPFSD and the Investment Policy Hub will enable IPFSD to remain a valuable resource for investment policy makers into the future.

== See also ==
- United Nations Conference on Trade and Development
- United Nations
- International Investment Agreements
- Foreign Direct Investment
- Sustainable Development
- Investment policy
- Developing country
- Bilateral Investment Treaty
