= Bilateral investment treaty =

Treaty for interstate private investment

A bilateral investment treaty (BIT) is an agreement establishing the terms and conditions for private investment by nationals and companies of one state in another state. This type of investment is called foreign direct investment (FDI). BITs are established through trade pacts. A nineteenth-century forerunner of the BIT is the "friendship, commerce and navigation treaty" (FCN). This kind of treaty came in to prominence after World Wars when the developed countries wanted to guard their investments in developing countries against expropriation.

Most BITs grant investments—made by an investor of one Contracting State in the territory of the other—a number of guarantees, which typically include fair and equitable treatment, protection from expropriation, free transfer of means and full protection and security. The distinctive feature of many BITs is that they allow for an alternative dispute resolution mechanism, whereby an investor whose rights under the BIT have been violated could have recourse to international arbitration, often under the auspices of the International Centre for Settlement of Investment Disputes (ICSID), rather than suing the host State in its own courts. This process is called investor-state dispute settlement (ISDS).

The world's first BIT was signed on November 25, 1959 between Pakistan and Germany. There are currently more than 2500 BITs in force, involving most countries in the world. and in recent years, the number of bilateral investment treaties and preferential trade agreements, in particular, has grown at a torrid pace; practically every country is a member of at least one. Influential capital exporting states usually negotiate BITs on the basis of their own "model" texts (such as the Indian or U.S. model BIT). Environmental provisions have also become increasingly common in international investment agreements, like BITs. As part of the effort to reform substantive standards of investment protection, states have sought to introduce the right to regulate into their new BITs.

A BIT may also provide for lists of excluded industries which the parties agree will not be covered by the BIT.

== Criticism ==
BITs give rights to investors, but give obligations only to States. Whilst preliminary objections by states are becoming more common in cases instituted under BITs, NGOs have spoken against the use of BITs - stating that they are essentially designed to protect foreign investors and do not take into account obligations and standards to protect the environment, labour rights, social provisions or natural resources. Moreover, when such clauses are agreed upon, the formulation is legally very open-ended and often unpredictable. A counter-claim may be a way of rebalancing investment law, by allowing States to file claims against investors, as a means to sanction investor misconduct.

== Notable people ==
- Franz J. Sedelmayer

== See also ==
- Agreement on Trade Related Investment Measures (WTO agreement)
- Arbitration
- International Centre for Settlement of Investment Disputes
- Investor-state dispute settlement
- Trade and Investment Framework Agreement (TIFA)
