= International Centre for Settlement of Investment Disputes =

International arbitration institution affiliated with the World Bank

- Centre international pour le règlement des différends relatifs aux investissements
- ICSID logo
- Formation: 14 October 1966; 60 years ago
- Type: International treaty institution
- Purpose: International arbitration
- Headquarters: Washington, D.C., United States
- Members: 165 countries (signatory and contracting states); 154 countries (contracting states only)
- Secretary-General: Martina Polasek
- Parent organization: World Bank Group
- Website: icsid.worldbank.org

The International Centre for Settlement of Investment Disputes (ICSID; French: Centre international pour le règlement des différends relatifs aux investissements or CIRDI) is an international arbitration institution established in 1966 for legal dispute resolution and conciliation between international investors and States. ICSID is part of and funded by the World Bank Group, headquartered in Washington, D.C., in the United States. It is an autonomous, multilateral specialized institution to encourage international flow of investment and mitigate non-commercial risks by a treaty drafted by the International Bank for Reconstruction and Development's executive directors and signed by member countries. As of May 2016, 153 contracting member states agreed to enforce and uphold arbitral awards in accordance with the ICSID Convention.

The centre performs advisory activities and maintains several publications.

== History ==
In the 1950s and 1960s, the Organisation for European Economic Cooperation (now the Organisation for Economic Co-operation and Development) had made several attempts to create a framework to protect international investments, but its efforts revealed conflicting views on how to provide compensation for the expropriation of foreign direct investment.

=== Creation ===
In 1961, Aron Broches, then-General Counsel of the International Bank for Reconstruction and Development (IBRD), developed the idea for a multilateral agreement on a process for resolving individual investment disputes on a case-by-case basis as opposed to imposing outcomes based on standards. Broches held conferences to consult legal experts from all parts of the world, including Europe, Africa, and Asia, to discuss and compose a preliminary agreement. The IBRD staff wrote an official draft of the agreement and consulted with legal representatives of the IBRD's board of directors to finalize the draft and have it approved.

The board of directors approved the final draft of the agreement, titled Convention on the Settlement of Investment Disputes between States and Nationals of Other States, and the Bank president disseminated the convention to its member states for signature on 18 March 1965. Twenty states immediately ratified the convention. The convention established the ICSID would become officially active on 14 October 1966.

=== Disputes settled ===
Since its founding, more than 1,000 cases have been brought to ICSID, all but 14 of which were arbitration cases. The remainder were conciliation cases. As of 2024, more than 700 cases have been concluded.

The Indonesian government was sued in June 2012 by a London-based mining company Churchill Mining after the local government revoked the concession rights held by a local company in which the firm had invested. The government is countering the Churchill case, claiming that Churchill did not have the correct type of mining licences.

In October 2012, an ICSID tribunal awarded a judgement of $1.8 billion for Occidental Petroleum against the government of Ecuador. Additionally, Ecuador had to pay $589 million in backdated compound interest and half of the costs of the tribunal, making its total penalty around $2.4 billion. The South American country annulled a contract with the oil firm on the grounds that it violated a clause that the company would not sell its rights to another firm without permission. The tribunal agreed the violation took place but judged that the annulment was not fair and equitable treatment to the company.

Irish oil firm Tullow Oil took the Ugandan government to court in November 2012 after value-added tax (VAT) was placed on goods and services the firm purchased for its operations in the country. The Ugandan government responded that the company had no right to claim tax on such goods prior to commencement of drilling.

Tobacco major Philip Morris sued Uruguay for alleged breaches to the Uruguay-Swiss BIT for requiring cigarette packs to display graphic health warnings and sued Australia under the Australia-Hong Kong BITS for requiring plain packaging for its cigarettes. The company claimed that the packaging requirements in both countries violate its investment.

In the context of Nuclear power phase-out in Germany, Swedish Energy company Vattenfall sought compensation from the German government for the premature shut-down of nuclear plants.

In July 2024, the International Center for Settlement of Investment Disputes ordered Morocco to pay $150 million to Corral Petroleum Holdings.

=== Performance since creation ===
Bilateral investment treaties (BITs) proliferated during the first decade of the 21st century, reaching more than 2,500 by 2007. Many such treaties contain text that refers present and future investment disputes to ICSID.

As of 30 June 2012, ICSID has registered 390 disputes. ICSID's caseload consisted of 88% convention arbitration cases, 2% convention conciliation cases, as well as 9% additional facility arbitration cases, and 1% additional facility conciliation cases. ICSID's registered cases were distributed across oil, gas and mining (25%), electricity and other energy (13%), other industries (12%), transportation industry (11%), construction industry (7%), financial industry (7%), information industry and communication industry (6%), water industry, sanitation, and food protection (6%), agriculture, fishing, and forestry (5%), services and trade (4%), and tourism industry (4%).

As of 27 July 2012, 246 of 390 registered arbitration cases were concluded, as of 30 June 2012, ICSID tribunals had resolved nearly two thirds (62%) of disputes while the remainder (38%) were settled or discontinued. As of 14 May 2016, 362 of 574 (62%) registered arbitration cases were concluded.

Conciliation commission reports were issued for 67% of the conciliation proceedings, while 33% of proceedings were discontinued. In 75% of the conciliation reports, parties failed to reach an agreement, and only 25% recorded agreement among parties.

As of 2012 only two governments, Gabon and Romania, had ever filed an ICSID case against an investor. States appearing most often as a respondent were in descending order: Argentina 49, Venezuela 36, Egypt 17, Ecuador 12, Congo 12, Peru 11 and Ukraine 10 times. Between 2009 and 2012, legal representation cost between US$1 and 7.6 million. The approximate duration of a case was 3.6 years.

As of 2019, ICSID's caseload included 2% conciliation cases. The rest were arbitrations.

== Governance ==
ICSID is governed by its Administrative Council which meets annually and elects the centre's secretary-general and deputy secretary-general, approves rules and regulations, conducts the centre's case proceedings, and approves the centre's budget and annual report. The council consists of one representative from each of the centre's contracting member states and is chaired by the President of the World Bank Group, although the president may not vote. ICSID's normal operations are carried out by its secretariat, which comprises 40 employees and is led by the secretary-general of ICSID. The secretariat provides support to the Administrative Council in conducting the centre's proceedings. It also manages the centre's Panel of Conciliators and Panel of Arbitrators. Each contracting member state may appoint four persons to each panel. In addition to serving as the centre's principal, the secretary-general is responsible for legally representing ICSID and serving as the registrar of its proceedings. As of 2012, Meg Kinnear serves as the centre's secretary-general.

== Membership ==
Contracting States to the ICSID Convention Signatory States to the ICSID Convention Former members states, withdrawn Non Member States

ICSID's 165 member states which have signed the centre's convention include 162 United Nations member states plus Kosovo. Of these member states, 154 are "contracting member states", that is they have ratified the contract. Former members are Bolivia and Venezuela, which withdrew in 2012. Ecuador withdrew from the ICSID Convention in 2009 but rejoined in 2021. All ICSID contracting member states, whether or not they are parties to a given dispute, are required by the ICSID Convention to recognize and enforce ICSID arbitral awards.

=== Non-contracting signatories ===
The following member states have signed the ICSID convention (date in parentheses), but have not ratified it.

- Belize (1986)
- Dominican Republic (2000)
- Ethiopia (1965)
- Guinea-Bissau (1991)
- Namibia (1998)
- Russia (1992)
- Thailand (1985)

=== Non members ===
Brazil, India and South Africa are countries with large economies that have never been ICSID members.

== Activities ==
ICSID does not conduct arbitration or conciliation proceedings itself, but offers institutional and procedural support to conciliation commissions, tribunals, and other committees which conduct such matters. The centre has two sets of rules that determine how cases will be initiated and conducted, either under the ICSID Convention, Regulations and Rules or the ICSID Additional Facility Rules. To be processed in accordance with the ICSID Convention, a legal dispute has to exist between one of the centre's contracting member states and a national of another contracting member state. It must also be of a legal nature and relate directly to an investment. A case can be processed under the ICSID Additional Facility Rules if one of the parties to the dispute is either not a contracting member state or a national of a contracting member state. However, most cases are arbitrated under the ICSID Convention. Recourse to ICSID conciliation and arbitration is entirely voluntary. However, once the parties have consented to arbitration under the ICSID Convention, neither party can unilaterally withdraw its consent.

The ICSID Secretariat may also administer dispute resolution proceedings under other treaties and regularly assists tribunals or disputing parties in arbitrations among investors and states under the United Nations Commission on International Trade Law (UNCITRAL)'s arbitration regulations. The centre provides administrative and technical support for a number of international dispute resolution proceedings through alternative facilities such as the Permanent Court of Arbitration in The Hague, Netherlands, the London Court of International Arbitration, and the International Chamber of Commerce in Paris, France.

ICSID also conducts advisory activities and research and publishes Investment Laws of the World and of Investment Treaties. Since April 1986, the centre has published a semi-annual law journal entitled ICSID Review: Foreign Investment Law Journal.

Although ICSID's proceedings generally take place in Washington, D.C., parties may agree that proceedings be held at one of a number of possible alternative locations, including the Permanent Court of Arbitration, the Regional Arbitration Centres of the Asian-African Legal Consultative Committee in Cairo, in Kuala Lumpur, or in Lagos, the Australian Centre for International Commercial Arbitration in Melbourne, the Australian Commercial Disputes Centre in Sydney, the Singapore International Arbitration Centre, the Gulf Cooperation Council Commercial Arbitration Centre in Bahrain, the German Institution of Arbitration, the Maxwell Chambers in Singapore, the Hong Kong International Arbitration Centre, and the Centre for Arbitration and Conciliation at the Chamber of Commerce of Bogota.

== Tayeb Benabderrahmane v. Qatar case ==
In 2022, Franco-Algerian consultant Tayeb Benabderrahmane initiated arbitration proceedings before ICSID against the State of Qatar. He invoked a breach of the 1996 France–Qatar bilateral investment treaty as well as general principles of international law. The dispute was registered under ICSID case reference ARB/22/23.

The claimant argued that he had been arbitrarily detained for 307 days in Doha starting in January 2020, without effective consular assistance and without access to independent legal counsel. He alleged that he was subjected to physical and psychological pressure before being released in October 2020 on condition that he sign a confidentiality protocol with financial penalties. In 2025, the United Nations Working Group on Arbitrary Detention concluded that his deprivation of liberty was arbitrary and in violation of the International Covenant on Civil and Political Rights.

On 31 May 2023, the Doha criminal court sentenced Benabderrahmane in absentia to death by firing squad for espionage. This judgment, of which the claimant only learned months later, became a central element in the arbitration. Seized of a request for provisional measures, the arbitral tribunal constituted under ICSID adopted, on 20 December 2023, a procedural order requiring Qatar to suspend the execution of the death sentence pending the final award.

This decision has been considered a notable precedent in investment law: rarely has an arbitral tribunal been called upon, even provisionally, to address the effects of a death penalty imposed by a national court. Several observers see this as an extension of the scope of protection offered by investment arbitration, encompassing the safeguarding of an investor’s fundamental rights alongside the protection of their assets.

The arbitration remains ongoing in 2026.

== Criticism ==
ICSID has sometimes been the target of criticism about grossly inequitable judgements. Notably, Jeffrey Sachs suggested that the US$5.9 billion judgement against Pakistan in relation to rights presumed by Tethyan Copper Company amounted to a "flawed and corrupt investment arbitration process". The Pakistan Supreme Court had voided a transaction entered into by Balochistan Development Authority finding in favour of Antofagasta plc of Chile and Barrick Mining of Canada. Nevertheless, others have suggested this amount is a fair reflection of the fact that a potentially extraordinary asset (Reko Diq Mine) had effectively been seized seemingly without good reason.

== See also ==
- Arbitration
- Bilateral investment treaty
- Bolivian gas conflict
- Calvo Doctrine
- Cochabamba protests of 2000
- Conciliation
- Investor-state dispute settlement
- Multilateral Agreement on Investment
- Reko Diq case
- Infinito Gold Ltd. v. Costa Rica
