= Albert Jan van den Berg =

Dutch lawyer

Albert Jan van den Berg (born 14 June 1949 in Amsterdam) is a founding partner of Hanotiau & van den Berg in Brussels (since 2001), an emeritus Professor of Law at the Erasmus University, Rotterdam, a visiting professor at Georgetown University Law Center, Washington DC and at the University of Tsinghua School of Law, Beijing and a member of the advisory board and Faculty of the Geneva Master of Laws in International Dispute Settlement (MIDS), Geneva.

== Education ==
Van den Berg holds a Doctor of Laws from the Erasmus University Rotterdam (1981), a "doctorat en droit" from the University of Aix-en-Provence (1977), a Master of Comparative Jurisprudence from the Institute on Foreign Law of New York University (1975) and a Master of Laws from the University of Amsterdam (1973).

== Career ==
His early professional career includes positions as partner at the law firms of Freshfields Bruckhaus Deringer in Amsterdam (1999–2001), Stibbe Simont Monahan Duhot in Amsterdam (1988–1999) and Van Doorne & Sjollema Advocaten in Rotterdam (1980–1988) and as Attorney-at-Law in Salah Hejailan, Riyadh (in association with Clifford-Turner/Van Doorne & Sjollema) in Saudi Arabia (1982). Albert Jan van den Berg is a former president (2003–2010) and secretary-general (1980–1988) of the Netherlands Arbitration Institute (NAI) in Rotterdam and a former vice-president of the London Court of International Arbitration (LCIA) (1998–2002). Furthermore, he has worked at the department of international commercial arbitration of the TCM Asser Institute (1978–1980) and as private assistant to Professor Pieter Sanders (1975–1978).

== Work in Arbitration ==
Albert Jan van den Berg is and has been sole, presiding and party-appointed arbitrator in numerous international arbitrations (ad hoc, American Arbitration Association (AAA/ICDR), Dominican Republic–Central America Free Trade Agreement (DRCAFTA), Cairo Regional Centre for International Commercial Arbitration (CRCICA), (DIAC), Energy Charter Treaty (ECT), International Chamber of Commerce (ICC), International Centre for the Settlement of Investment Disputes (ICSID), LCIA, North American Free Trade Agreement (NAFTA), NAI, Organization for the Harmonization of Corporate Law in Africa (OHADA), Permanent Court of Arbitration (PCA), Stockholm Chamber of Commerce (SCC), Singapore International Arbitration Centre (SIAC) and United Nations Commission on International Trade Law (UNCITRAL) relating to, inter alia, airports, banking, broadcasting, construction, defence projects, distributorship, electricity and gas supply, fashion, futures and options, gambling, information technology, insurance and reinsurance, investments, joint ventures, licensing, media, mining, oil and gas, pharmaceuticals, post-M&A, post-privatization, professional associations, sales, satellites, shale gas, solar energy, sports, tax, telecom and turnkey projects. Awards rendered by Albert Jan van den Berg as presiding, sole or party-appointed arbitrator include:

- Atlantic Triton Company Limited v. People's Revolutionary Republic of Guinea (ICSID Case No. ARB/84/1), Award, 21 April 1986 (publicly mentioned)
- Houston Industries Energy, Inc. and others v. The Republic of Argentina (ICSID Case No. ARB/98/1), Award, 24 August 2001
- Alex Genin and others v. Republic of Estonia (ICSID Case No. ARB/99/2), Award, 25 June 2001 (available online)
- Bank for International Settlements (PCA), Partial Award, 22 November 2002; Final Award, 19 September 2003 (available online)
- Petrobart Ltd. v. Kyrgyz Republic, Award, 13 February 2003 (UNICTRAL, Kyrgyz Foreign Investment Law)
- Enron Corporation and Ponderosa Assets, L.P. v. The Republic of Argentina (ICSID Case No. ARB/01/3), Decision on Jurisdiction, 14 January 2004; Decision on Jurisdiction on the Ancillary Claim, 2 August 2004; Award, 22 May 2007 (available online)
- Fireman's Fund Insurance Company v. United Mexican States, Award, 17 July 2006 (ICSID Case No. ARB(AF)/02/1)
- LG&E Energy Corp., LG&E Capital Corp. and LG&E International Inc. v. The Republic of Argentina (ICSID Case No. ARB/02/1), Decision on Objections to Jurisdiction, 30 April 2004; Decision on Liability, 3 October 2006; Award, 25 July 2007; Decision on Claimants’ Request for Supplementary Decision, 8 July 2008 (available online)
- International Thunderbird Gaming v. Mexico (UNCITRAL, NAFTA), Award, 26 January 2006 (available online)
- BG Group Plc. v. The Republic of Argentina (UNCITRAL), Award, 24 December 2007 (available online)
- Pan American Energy LLC and BP Argentina Exploration Company v. The Republic of Argentina (ICSID Case No. ARB/03/13), Decision on Preliminary Objections, 27 July 2006 (available online)
- ADC Affiliate Limited and ADC & ADMC Management Limited v. Republic of Hungary (ICSID Case No. ARB/03/16), Award, 2 October 2006 (available online)
- Plama Consortium Limited v. Republic of Bulgaria (ICSID Case No. ARB/03/24), Decision on Jurisdiction, 8 February 2005; Award, 27 August 2008 (available online)
- BP America Production Company and others v. The Republic of Argentina (ICSID Case No. ARB/04/8), Decision on Preliminary Objection, 27 July 2006 (available online)
- Duke Energy Electroquil Partners and Electroquil S.A. v. Republic of Ecuador (ICSID Case No. ARB/04/19), Award, 28 August 2008 (available online)
- Chevron Corporation (U.S.A.) and Texaco Petroleum Company (U.S.A.) v. The Republic of Ecuador (PCA Case No. AA277), Interim Award, 1 December 2008; Partial Award on the Merits, 30 March 2010; Final Award, 31 August 2011 (available online)
- Government of the province of East Kalimantan v. PT Kaltim Prima Coal and others (ICSID Case No. ARB/07/3), Award, 28 December 2009
- United States v. Canada (LCIA Case No. 81010), Award, 20 January 2011 (available online)
- Mercuria Energy Group Limited v. Republic of Poland (SCC), Decision on Jurisdiction, 1 December 2009; Final Award, 1 December 2011
- Achmea B.V. v. The Slovak Republic (UNCITRAL, PCA Case No. 2008-13) (formerly Eureko B.V. v. The Slovak Republic), Award on Jurisdiction, Arbitrability and Suspension, 26 October 2010; Award, 7 December 2012 (available online)
- Commerce Group Corp. and San Sebastian Gold Mines, Inc. v. The Republic of El Salvador (ICSID Case No. ARB/09/17), Award, 14 March 2011 (available online)
- GEA Group Aktiengesellschaft v. Ukraine (ICSID Case No. ARB/08/16), Award, 31 March 2011 (available online)
- Abaclat and others v. The Republic of Argentina (ICSID Case No. ARB/07/05) (formerly Giovanna A. Beccara and others v. The Republic of Argentina), Decision on Jurisdiction and Admissibility, 4 August 2011 (available online)
- United States v. Canada (LCIA Case No. 111790), Award, 18 July 2012 (available online)
- Enkev Beheer B.V. v. The Republic of Poland (UNCITRAL, PCA Case No. 2013-11), Partial Award, 29 April 2014; Final Award on Costs, 13 June 2014
- Churchill Mining PLC and Planet Mining Pty Ltd. v. Republic of Indonesia (ICSID Case No. ARB12/14 and 12/40), Decision on Jurisdiction, 24 February 2014 (available online)

Furthermore, Albert Jan van den Berg frequently acts as counsel in commercial arbitrations and as expert before national courts on issues involving Dutch law and the Convention on the Recognition and Enforcement of Foreign Arbitral Awards of 1958 (New York Convention).

Albert Jan van den Berg is on many panels of arbitrators, including: AAA, New York; Arbitral Centre of the Federal Economic Chamber, Vienna; Arbitral Tribunal for Football, World Cup Division for the 2002 FIFA World Cup, Geneva; China International Economic and Trade Arbitration Commission (CIETAC), Beijing; Hong Kong International Arbitration Centre (HKIAC); Indonesian Board of National Arbitration (BANI), Jakarta; ICSID, Washington; Kuala Lumpur Regional Centre for Arbitration (KLRCA); NAI; Prime Finance; and SIAC.

Furthermore, Albert Jan van den Berg is a former president of the International Council for Commercial Arbitration (ICCA), a Fellow of the Chartered Institute of Arbitrators (FCIArb) and a member of: the Commission on International Arbitration of the ICC; the LCIA Company; the supervisory board of NAI; the Board of Trustees of the Foundation for International Arbitration Advocacy (FIAA); the advisory board of the MIDS; the Academic Council of the Center for American and International Law (ITA); and the board of trustees of the Institute of International Commercial Law of Pace University School of Law.

Fluent in Dutch, English, and French, Albert Jan van den Berg has authored and edited numerous publications on various topics of international arbitration. An extended list of publications and related publications can be found in the following websites: http://www.hvdb.com and http://www.newyorkconvention.org. Albert Jan van den Berg is particularly known for his commentary on the New York Convention, “The New York Arbitration Convention of 1958 – Towards a Uniform Judicial Interpretation”, originally his doctoral thesis under the supervision of Professor Pieter Sanders.

Albert Jan van den Berg currently serves as the General Editor of Yearbook Commercial Arbitration, and of ICCA Congress Series and is a member of the editorial boards of London’s Global Counsel, Global Arbitration Review and Rotterdam’s Tijdschrift voor Arbitrage.

Albert Jan van den Berg is also the author of the website http://www.newyorkconvention.org, a website that provides access to information regarding the New York Convention in general, its history, its interpretation and application by the courts, a bibliography, and other relevant matters such as a “draft” for a revised New York Convention, authored by Albert Jan van den Berg himself. The website also provides easy-to-use tools to find case law on how the courts have interpreted and applied the New York Convention's provisions (more than 1700 court decisions from more than 65 countries), such information being provided in association with ICCA and Kluwer Arbitration.

Van den Berg was named the world's leading commercial arbitrator by the International Who's Who of Business Lawyers in 2006 and 2011. In 2013 he received the “Best Prepared and Most Responsive Arbitrator” award by Global Arbitration Review.

== Criticism ==
With regard to the controversy surrounding Investor-State Arbitration, van den Berg was named as a member of an elite group of 15 arbitrators who handle most investment treaty arbitral proceedings in a report by NGO Corporate Europe Observatory. According to the report, van den Berg supported contradictory outcomes in two cases brought against Argentina following the state's economic crisis in 2001/2002 even though the facts and reasoning of defence of both lawsuits were nearly identical. However, the criticism does not seem to be justified. Professor Van den Berg never issues dissenting opinions and opposes their use by party-appointed arbitrators in investor-State arbitration. Within that perspective, one cannot attribute the decision of an entire tribunal to one member.
