= International arbitration =

Arbitration between companies or individuals in different countries

International arbitration can refer to arbitration between companies or individuals in different states, usually by including a provision for future disputes in a contract (typically referred to as international commercial arbitration) or between different states qua states (typically referred to as interstate arbitration).

Civil and commercial arbitration agreements and arbitral awards are enforced under the United Nations Convention on the Recognition and Enforcement of Foreign Arbitral Awards of 1958 (the "New York Convention"). The International Centre for the Settlement of Investment Disputes (ICSID) also handles arbitration, but it is limited to investor-state dispute settlement.

The New York Convention was drafted under the auspices of the United Nations and has been ratified by more than 150 countries, including most major countries involved in significant international trade and economic transactions. The New York Convention requires the states that have ratified it to recognize and enforce international arbitration agreements and foreign arbitral awards issued in other contracting states, subject to certain limited exceptions. These provisions of the New York Convention, together with the large number of contracting states, have created an international legal regime that significantly favors the enforcement of international arbitration agreements and awards. It was preceded by the 1927 Convention on the Execution of Foreign Arbitral Awards in Geneva.

== Features ==
International arbitration is an alternative to local court procedures. International arbitration has different rules than domestic arbitration, a distinction that is particularly rigid in jurisdictions with "dualist" regimes. For example, in Colombia, procedural incompatibilities arising when a case shifts between domestic and international frameworks can lead to the annulment of the award, and have their own non-country-specific standards of ethical conduct.

The process may be more limited than typical litigation and forms a hybrid between the common law and civil law legal systems. For example, the International Bar Association (IBA)'s Rules on the Taking of Evidence in International Commercial Arbitration, revised in 2010, do not adopt common law broad disclosure procedures (discovery) or follow the civil law in eliminating entirely the ability of engaging in some disclosure-related practices. The IBA Rules blend common and civil systems so that parties may narrowly tailor disclosure to the agreement's particular subject matter.

David Rivkin, who chaired the committee that drafted the rules, has noted that the wide adoption of these rules in international arbitration has led in practice to an unexpected use by common law practitioners to limit disclosure and by civil law practitioners to expand it.

The rules can be further impacted by arbitral rules that may be agreed upon between the parties.

A presumption of confidentiality—whether implied or explicit—exists between the parties to an international commercial arbitration; however, there may be a disconnect between that presumption and the realities of disclosure and publicity imposed by the courts, arbitrators, and even the parties themselves.

=== Global enforcement ===
Most countries, especially in the developed world, are signatories of the New York Convention. Consequently, judgements can be enforced across the world. The New York Convention, more formally known as the United Nations Convention on the Recognition and Enforcement of Foreign Arbitral Awards, provides for court recognition and enforcement of foreign arbitration decisions, allowing arbitration proceedings to piggyback on the authority of domestic jurisdictions across the world.

In contrast, there is no equivalent treaty for the international recognition of court decisions with a large membership although the Hague Convention of 30 June 2005 on Choice of Court Agreements entered into force in 2015 for the European Union and Mexico. Similarly, no equivalent treaty exists so far for the international recognition of settlements achieved in mediation or conciliation:so far, a meeting of the UNCITRAL Working Group II in New York has taken place in February 2015 subsequent to a US proposal for that working group to develop a convention on the enforcement of conciliated settlement agreements for international commercial disputes. Within the EU, the enforceability of mediation agreements is ruled by Directive 2008/52/EC.

=== Protection from lawsuits ===
Under the New York Convention, if a party to arbitration files a lawsuit in breach of an arbitration agreement, the court is obligated to recognize an agreement in writing under which the parties undertake to submit to arbitration. Chapter 2 of the Federal Arbitration Act sets forth the statutory basis for an American court to direct that arbitration be held.

=== Enforcement ===
Under the New York Convention, Article III requires courts in contracting states to recognize international arbitral awards as binding and enforce them. Article V provides for seven reasons that a court can use to refuse to enforce the award.

== Cases and statistics ==
Public information on overall and specific arbitration cases is quite limited as there is no need to involve the courts at all unless there is a dispute, and in most cases the loser pays voluntarily. In China, a review of disputed cases in China found that from 2000 to 2011, in 17 cases the Supreme People's Court upheld the refusal to enforce the arbitration agreement due to a provision in Article V; China has an automatic appeal system to the highest court, so this includes all such refusals.

== Agreement details ==
A number of essential elements should be included in almost all international arbitration agreements, with model language available. These include the agreement to arbitrate, a definition of the scope of disputes subject to arbitration, the means for selecting the arbitrator(s), a choice of the arbitral seat, and the adoption of institutional or ad hoc arbitration rules. A number of other provisions can also be included in international arbitration clauses, including the language for the conduct of the arbitration, choice of applicable law, arbitrator qualifications, interim relief, costs, and procedural matters.

In order to bridge the gap when parties to an international agreement have difficulty in agreeing upon an arbitral institution, some international arbitration specialists recommend using an arbitration clause that authorizes two arbitral institutions in the same city. Those clauses generally empower the party commencing the arbitration to select the arbitral institution.

A mnemonic device, "BLINC LLC", reflects some of the most important clauses: broad, law, institutional, number, costs, location, language, and carve-out.

== Arbitration organizations ==
Several major international institutions and rule making bodies set out rules and appoint arbitrators. The most significant are:

Institution	Abbreviation	Seat	Location	Operator	Established
London Court of International Arbitration	LCIA	London	United Kingdom		1892
Arbitration Institute of the Stockholm Chamber of Commerce	SCC	Stockholm	Sweden	Stockholm Chamber of Commerce	1917
International Court of Arbitration	ICC	Paris	France	International Chamber of Commerce	1923
American Arbitration Association (International Center for Dispute Resolution)	AAA (ICDR)	New York	United States		1926
International Centre for Settlement of Investment Disputes	ICSID (ICSID)	Washington DC	United States		1966
Center for Arbitration and Mediation of the Chamber of Commerce Brazil-Canada	CAM-CCBC (CAM-CCBC)	São Paulo	Brazil		1979
Hong Kong International Arbitration Centre	HKIAC	Hong Kong			1985
Singapore International Arbitration Centre	SIAC	Singapore			1991

Other important institutions for arbitration in North America are JAMS International and the British Columbia International Commercial Arbitration Centre (BCICAC, Canada).

Specialist ADR bodies also exist, such as the World Intellectual Property Organisation (WIPO), which has an arbitration and mediation center and a panel of international neutrals specialising in intellectual property and technology related disputes.

A number of arbitral institutions have adopted the UNCITRAL Rules for use in international cases. See for example Australia's adoption of the UNCITRAL Rules in its 6 July 2010 amendment to the International Arbitration Act 1974 (Cth).

The most salient feature of the rules of the ICC is its use of the "terms of reference". The "terms of reference" is a summary of the claims and issues in dispute and the particulars of the procedure and is prepared by the tribunal and signed by the parties near the beginning of the proceedings.

In a more recent development, the Swiss Chambers of Commerce and Industry of Basel, Berne, Geneva, Lausanne, Lugano, Neuchâtel and Zurich have adopted a new set of Swiss Rules of Commercial Mediation that are designed to integrate fully with the Swiss Rules of International Arbitration that were previously adopted by these chambers to harmonize international arbitration and mediation proceedings across Switzerland.

== Research and other organizations ==
The International Arbitration Institute, until recently headed by the late Emmanuel Gaillard, was created in 2001, under the auspices of the Comité français de l’arbitrage (CFA), to promote exchanges and transparency in the international commercial arbitration community. The Association for International Arbitration is a non-profit organisation founded in Paris in 2001 by Johan Billiet which provides information, training and educational activities but does not appoint arbitrators.

ASA - Swiss Arbitration Association, a non-profit association since 1974, together with ASA Below 40, has over 1’200 members, practitioners and academics engaged and/or interested in domestic and international arbitration, from Switzerland and abroad. ASA contributes to the development of arbitration law and practice through regular conferences and workshops, including the Annual Conference; the Arbitration Practice Seminar; ASA Local Group meetings; ASA below 40 events for young practitioners, and the publication of the ASA Bulletin, an arbitration quarterly, and of the ASA Special Series.

== International investment and ICSID ==
The International Centre for the Settlement of Investment Disputes (ICSID) is an ad hoc tribunal established pursuant to UNCITRAL Rules to arbitrate International Investment Agreements and provide foreign investors with a means for redress against states for breaches of contract. ICSID was designed so that it cannot be reviewed by domestic courts which in theory makes it more enforceable. However, state immunity to lawsuits and judgments poses a barrier to collection.

The legal protection of foreign direct investment is guaranteed by a network of more than 2750 Bilateral Investment Treaties (BITs), Multilateral Investment Treaties, most notably the Energy Charter Treaty and a number of free trade agreements containing chapter on investment protection through investor-state dispute settlement, such as NAFTA. The overall number of cases concluded reached 244. Of them, approximately 42% were decided in favour of the state and approximately 31% in favour of the investor. Approximately 27% of the cases were settled.

== Interstate arbitration ==
Arbitration has been used for centuries, including in antiquity, for the resolution of disputes between states and state-like entities. After a period of relative disuse, Jay's Treaty between the United States and Great Britain revived international arbitration as a means of resolving interstate disputes. The 1899 and 1907 Hague Conferences addressed arbitration as a mechanism for resolving state-to-state disputes, leading to the adoption of the Hague Conventions for the Pacific Settlement of International Disputes. The Conventions established the Permanent Court of Arbitration and a rudimentary institutional framework for international arbitration of interstate disputes. In recent years, international arbitration has been used to resolve a number of disputes between states or state-like entities, including Eritrea v. Yemen, the Abyei Arbitration, the OSPAR Arbitration, and the Iron Rhine Arbitration.

== See also ==
- Charles C. Adams Jr.
- American Arbitration Association
- Arbitration
- Arbitration award
- Jean-Paul Beraudo
- George Bermann
- Gary Born
- International Arbitration League
- International Arbitration and Peace Association
- International Bar Association
- International Chamber of Commerce
- Albert Jan van den Berg
- London Court of International Arbitration
- Jan Paulsson
- Permanent Court of Arbitration
- United Nations Commission on International Trade Law
- Siegfried H. Elsing
- Kompetenz-kompetenz
- United Nations Convention on Transparency in Treaty-based Investor-State Arbitration

== Lectures ==
- Lecture by Georges Abi-Saab entitled The International Judicial Function in the Lecture Series of the United Nations Audiovisual Library of International Law
- Lecture by Stephen M. Schwebel entitled The Merits (and Demerits) of International Adjudication and Arbitration in the Lecture Series of the United Nations Audiovisual Library of International Law
