= Jean-Paul Béraudo =

French judge

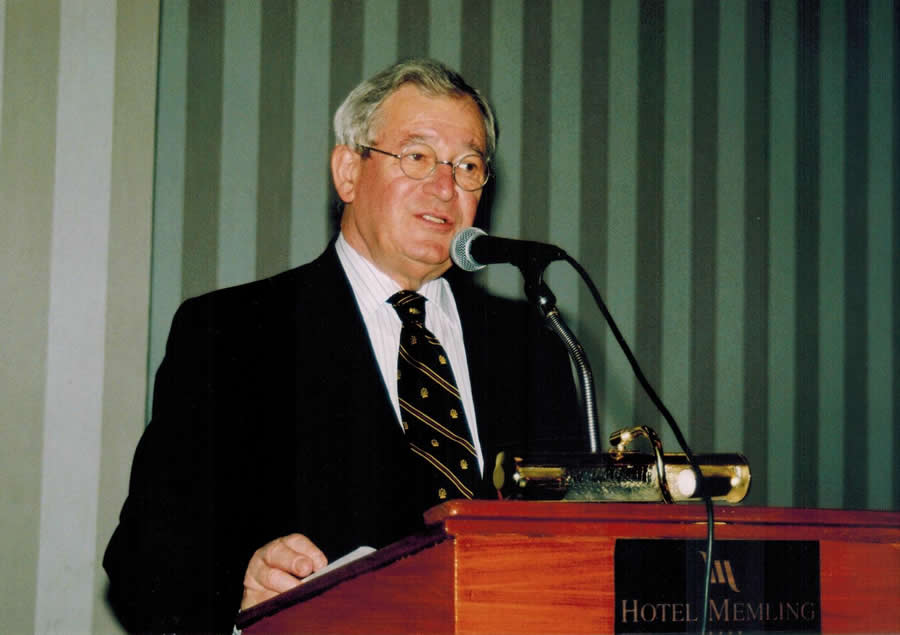
Jean-Paul Beraudo

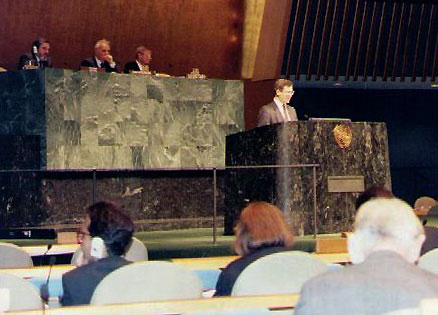
Jean-Paul Beraudo Speaker at the United Nations

Justice Jean-Paul Beraudo (born 1946) is a lawyer, academic and author of legal works. He was Justice at the French Supreme Court (Cour de Cassation) and vice-chairman of the International Court of Arbitration. He lectures on International Private Law and International Trade Law at Panthéon-Sorbonne University (Paris I University) and on Company law at Sciences-Po, Paris. The International Institute for the Unification of Private Law (UNIDROIT) appointed him correspondent for France and a member of the scientific committee.

He also delivers legal opinions to be shown in courts, in England and Wales including the Privy Council of the United Kingdom and United States Federal courts on forum non conveniens disputes, and on US class actions.

He was consulted as an adviser by the Democratic Republic of Congo about the ratification of the 1958 New York convention on arbitration.

Beraudo is married with three children.

== Career ==
Justice Béraudo has developed a dual career as judge and lawyer and as French delegate to international organizations. He was appointed Professor of law in several universities.

From 1977 to 1991 he was Judge for the European and International Bureau of the French Ministry of Justice. In that capacity he conducted several important negotiations in different forums either as delegate or as elected Chairman:

- Intergovernmental Organisation for International Carriage by Rail
  - French Delegate in 1980; Chairman of the Revision Committee of the Convention concerning International Carriage by Rail in 1990.
- International Maritime Organization, based in London
  - 1984 Protocols on the Indemnification for Damages caused by Hydrocarbon Pollution
  - International Convention on Liability and Compensation for Damage in Connection with the Carriage of Hazardous and Noxious Substances by Sea, 1996
- International Civil Aviation Organization, based in Montreal
  - Protocol to amend the Convention on Damage Caused by Foreign Aircraft to Third Parties on the Surface, 1978
- International Institute for the Unification of Private Law (UNIDROIT), based in Rome
  - Hotel keepers liability (draft)
  - Convention on International Financial Leasing, 1988
  - Convention on International Factoring, 1988
  - Convention on Civil Liability for Damages Caused during Carriage of Dangerous Goods by Road, Rail and Inland Navigation Vessels, 1988
    - For this convention, he chaired the joint UN - UNIDROIT Committee which concluded the negotiations.
  - Speaker at several UNIDROIT seminars in particular in Paris, Rome and Venezuela
  - Chairman and speaker at the ICC - UNIDROIT symposium held in Paris for the presentation of the UNIDROIT Principles of 1994
  - Member of the Scientific Committee for the Uniform Law Review
- Hague Conference on Private International Law
  - Protocol on the Law Applicable to Certain Consumer Sales, 1978
  - Convention on International Access to Justice, 1980
  - Convention on the Law Applicable to Trusts and on their Recognition, 1985
  - Convention on the Law Applicable to Contracts for the International Sale of Goods, 1986
- Council of Europe
  - European Convention on Certain International Aspects of Bankruptcy, 1990
  - Protocol on Summary Proceedings
- European Union
  - Chairman of various working groups implementing the Single European Act
  - Lugano Convention on Jurisdiction and the Enforcement of Judgments in Civil and Commercial Matters, 1988
  - San Sebastian Convention on the Accession of the Kingdom of Spain and the Portuguese Republic to the Convention on Jurisdiction and the Enforcement of Judgments in Civil and Commercial Matters, 1989
- United Nations Commission on International Trade Law
  - Chairman of Commission I at the Diplomatic Conference on the Liability of Operators of Transport Terminals in International Trade, 1991
    - In a diplomatic conference, Committee I is the forum where the effective negotiation takes place. Since its creation, in 1966, UNCITRAL has held fewer than 10 diplomatic conferences.
  - Speaker at the UNCITRAL Congress in New York for the 25th anniversary of the creation of UNCITRAL, 1992
  - Working groups on:
    - The Legal Guide on drawing up international contracts for the construction of industrial works, 1988
    - The Model Law on procurement of goods and construction, 1993
  - Negotiations of the Conventions on:
    - International bills of exchange and international promissory notes, 1988
    - Independent guarantees and stand-by letters of credit, 1995
  - Chairman and speaker at several UNCITRAL seminars in Vienna, Singapore, Cameroon and Madagascar
  - Speaker at the 40th anniversary of UNCITRAL Congress in July 2007 in Vienna
  - At the colloquium held for the 50th anniversary of the New York convention on arbitration, in March 2008, he was the sole French speaker.
- UNCTAD
  - United Nations Convention on Multimodal Transport, 1980
  - United Nations Convention on Maritime liens and mortgages, 1993

From 1974 to 1976, Justice Béraudo was a full-capacity judge at the Tribunal de Grande Instance of Compiègne, acting in particular as an investigating judge. As a judge in Civil Matters, he handed down several decisions in Private International Law and on International Jurisdiction which were published and commented on in specialized journals.

From 1976 to 1991, Justice Béraudo worked for the French Ministry of Justice, at the Bureau of General Civil Law (1976–1977), then at the Bureau of European and International Law of the Department of Civil Affairs and the Seal (Director of the Bureau from 1985).

From 1991 to 2000, Justice Béraudo was Presiding Judge of Division of the Grenoble Court of Appeals. From 1995, when he presided over the Commercial Division of the Grenoble Court of Appeals (1995–2000), he dealt with many international litigation cases in which, among other things, the Vienna Convention on the International Sale of Goods, UNIDROIT principles and jurisdictional rules created by the Brussels and Lugano Conventions were applied. He decided also on setting aside and enforcement proceedings of arbitral awards.

From 2000 to 2003, Justice Béraudo was a Judge in the Criminal Division of the French Supreme Court (Cour de Cassation) where he dealt with professional and business criminal litigation cases.

From 1995 to 2001, Justice Béraudo was an associate professor at Paris I University (Panthéon-Sorbonne). At present, he lectures on private international law and international trade law at the same university and on Company law at Sciences-Po, Paris.

Justice Béraudo acted as co-arbitrator, sole arbitrator or chairman of arbitral tribunals on more than 35 cases, most of them ICC cases. Some decisions have been published and commented on in specialized journals:

- disputes involving Western parties v. Latin American parties (10731/KGA, sale contract, transfer of risks; 11772/CCO, power contract; 11677/KGA, railways concession; 122231/KGA/CCO, sale of company contract)
- disputes involving Western European parties v. Eastern Europe parties (9917/FMS, agency contract; 11174/FMS, privatization of companies contract; 13009/EC, sale contract, dispute on settlement agreement validity; 13450/AVH, agency contract)
- disputes involving European parties v. Middle Eastern parties (9119/AC, travel agent contract; 10059/FMS, vessel building; 18553/ND, commercial agent contract and ad hoc proceedings)
- disputes involving only parties from Western countries, industrial equipment contract; 8817/FMS, agent contract; 10148/KGA, highway airport equipment contract; 13386/AVH, M & A operation; and ad hoc proceedings)
- disputes involving US v. European parties (7249/JJA, publisher contract; and ad hoc proceedings)
- ICC conciliation between US and Swiss banks on liability for payment of first demand guarantee
- Also CMAP case on Software sale contract

Some disputes which are under way or were settled recently are not mentioned.

Justice Béraudo has taken on various roles for the ICC, for which he is a member of the International Arbitration Commission :

- Speaker at several ICC seminars in Tunisia, Morocco and United Arab Emirates
- Speaker at the UNIDROIT-ICC seminar on UNIDROIT principles
- Chairman of the international working group on criminal law and arbitration

He chaired also working groups of the French National Committee on Arbitration clause in Trust Deeds (the result of the work was adopted by the International Commission), and on the revision of ICC Rules on International Arbitration. In December 2005, he was elected vice-chairman of the International Court of Arbitration by the World Council of the ICC. In March 2009, he chaired a colloquium on disputes resolution in accordance with the OHADA rules. Since 2000, he delivers lectures on trust law to trustees and wealth managers in seminars organized by Academy & Finance.

== Main publications ==
=== International private law ===
- "The Lugano Convention of September 16, 1988, on Jurisdiction and the Enforcement of Judgments in Civil and Commercial Matters", International Law Dictionary, ("Jurisclasseur de Droit International"), May 1991
- "The Brussels Convention of September 27, 1968, on Jurisdiction and the Enforcement of Judgments in Civil and Commercial Matters", International Law Dictionary, ("Jurisclasseur de Droit International"), September 1996
- "The International Application of the New Provisions of the French Civil Code on the Liability for Defective Products",("L'application internationale des nouvelles dispositions du Code Civil sur La responsabilité du fait des produits défectueux"), Jurisclasseur Périodique, June 1999
- "The Council Regulation 44/2001 on Jurisdiction and the Recognition and Enforcement of Judgments in Civil and Commercial Matters", International Law Review ("Journal du droit International"), 2002, p. 377
- "Trust", ("Le Trust"), Répertoire Dalloz de Droit international, 1998
- "The Rogatory Commission (Civil Matters)", Répertoire Dalloz de Droit international, January 2005
- "The Council Regulation 1215/2012 on Jurisdiction and the Recognition and Enforcement of Judgments" (journal du droit international 2013 p. 741)
- Jurisclasseur of European Law on the Brussels and Lugano Conventions, and on the Council Regulation 44/2001

Some of those writings are used by the Court of Justice of the European Union or the Advocate-General to ground decisions or opinions (C-144/09, C-585/08)

=== International trade law ===
- "The New International Law on the Sale of Goods", ("Le nouveau droit de la vente internationale de marchandises"), in collaboration with Ph. Khan, Paris Chamber of Commerce Publishing,1989
- "Commented Collection of the Principal Conventions of International Trade", ("Recueil commenté des principales Conventions du commerce international"), Masson Editions, 1995
- "Shall We Be Afraid of Contracts without Law?", ("Faut-il avoir peur du contrat sans loi? "), International Private Law Critical Review, Collection in honor of Professor Paul Lagarde, 2005

=== Arbitration law ===
- "United Nations Convention on Contracts for the International Sale of Goods and Arbitration",("La Convention des Nations Unies sur les contrats de vente internationale de marchandises et l'arbitrage"), ICC International Court of Arbitration Bulletin ("Bulletin de la Cour Internationale d'arbitrage de la CCI"), May 1994
- "The Inter-American Congress on UNIDROIT Principles", ("Le Congrès interaméricain sur les Principes UNIDROIT"), ICC International Court of Arbitration Bulletin ("Bulletin de la Cour Internationale d'arbitrage de la CCI"), May 1997
- "The Arbitration Exception of the Brussels and Lugano Conventions on Jurisdiction, Recognition and Enforcement of Judgments" ("L’exception d’arbitrage des conventions de Lugano et de Bruxelles concernant la compétence judiciaire et l’exécution des decisions en matière civile et commerciale"), Journal of International Arbitration (Journal international de l’arbitrage), 2001
- "The Recognition by Courts of Provisional and Interim Measures Decided by an Arbitral Tribunal", (La reconnaissance par les tribunaux des measures provisoires ordonnées par un tribunal arbitral), Journal of International Arbitration, (Journal international de l’arbitrage), 2005
- "Case law on articles 5, 8, 16 of the UNCITRAL Model Arbitration Law", Journal of International Arbitration, 2006
- "Egregious error of law as a ground for setting aside an arbitral award", Journal of International Arbitration, 2007

=== Other legal areas ===
- "Anglo-Saxons Trusts and French Law", ("les trusts anglo-saxons et le droit français"), LGDJ 1992
- "Les trusts anglo-saxons et les pays de droit civil, approche juridique et fiscale", Academy & Finance, Genève, 2006
- "Franco-Spanish Relationships in International Private Law", ("Les relations franco-espagnoles de Droit International Privé"), Paris 1 University, PhD thesis, 1975
