= Philip Morris v. Uruguay =

Arbitration case on smoking regulations

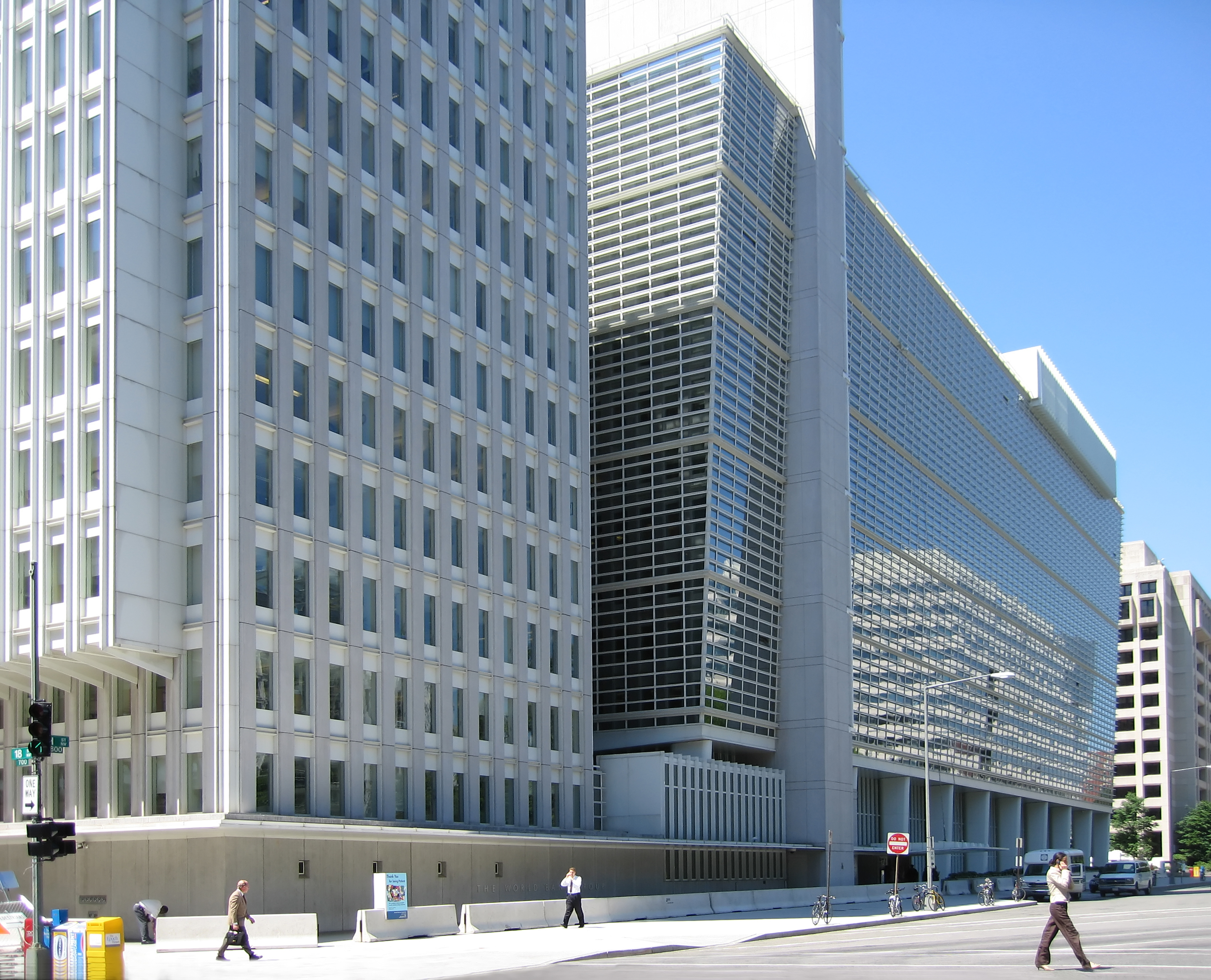
- Office ICSID in 2006
- Court: ICSID
- Full case name: ARB/10/7. Philip Morris Brand Sàrl (Switzerland), Philip Morris Products S.A. (Switzerland) v. Oriental Republic of Uruguay
- Decided: 8 July 2016 (6 years old)
- Transcript: Sentence links

Court membership
- Judges sitting: Gary Born, James Crawford, Piero Bernardini

Keywords
- Cigarettes, intellectual property, health

The Philip Morris v. Uruguay case (Spanish: Caso Philip Morris contra Uruguay) was an investor-state dispute settlement case initiated on 19 February 2010 and concluded on 8 July 2016, in which the multinational tobacco company Philip Morris International (PMI), whose head office is located in Lausanne, lodged a complaint against Uruguay that was resolved by international arbitration under the auspices of the International Centre for Settlement of Investment Disputes (ICSID).

The ICSID case was legally known as the Philip Morris Brands Sàrl, Philip Morris Products S.A. and Abal Hermanos S.A. v. Oriental Republic of Uruguay, ICSID Case No. ARB/10/7.

PMI's complaint alleged that Uruguay's anti-smoking legislation introducing plain tobacco packaging devalued its cigarette trademarks and investments in the country and sought compensation of twenty-five million dollars for engaging in anticompetitive practices in violation of the bilateral investment treaty between Switzerland, where Philip Morris International is headquartered, and Uruguay.

The treaty provides that disputes may be settled by binding arbitration under the auspices of the International Centre for Settlement of Investment Disputes (ICSID).

Uruguay had received accolades from the World Health Organization and from anti-smoking activists for its anti-smoking campaign.

On 8 July 2016, after 6 years, the ICSID ruled in favor of Uruguay, forcing PMI to pay the expenses of the defendants and the court.

== Context ==
On 19 June 2003, when the Uruguayan President was Jorge Batlle, the General Assembly of Uruguay approved the WHO Framework Convention on Tobacco Control, an international treaty that requires signatories to enact various anti-smoking policies recommended by the World Health Organization.

In 2006, Uruguay under President Tabaré Vázquez, an oncologist by profession, began to enact comprehensive anti-smoking legislation. On 1 March 2006, Uruguay became the first country in Latin America to prohibit smoking in enclosed public spaces. In March 2008 the legislature approved Law 18.256 which includes six strategies of anti-smoking policy.

Some of the measures by the government were the ban on selling different types of presentations of the same brand of cigarettes, the dissemination of images warning about the risks of smoking and covering at least 80% of the cigarette pack, raising of taxes, banning cigarette advertising in the media, and banning sponsorship of sports events. In addition, smoking was banned in public places such as offices, student centers, bars, restaurants, dances and public places, among others.

The smokefree campaign "Libre de Humo de Tabaco" was gradually implemented by the "Ministerio de Salud Pública del Uruguay" (Ministry of Public Health of Uruguay).

== Complaint ==
Philip Morris International is a multinational company, a leading producer of cigarettes, of which it owns seven out of twenty global brands.

The tobacco company initiated a claim in the International Centre for Settlement of Investment Disputes (ICSID), a part of the World Bank seeking $25 million in compensation from Uruguay. In that forum, an arbitration tribunal was formed with one arbitrator appointed by each party and a third arbitrator elected by the arbitrators appointed by the parties. The plaintiffs are FTR Holding SA (Switzerland), Philip Morris Products SA (Switzerland) and Abal Hermanos SA (PMI representative in Uruguay) against Uruguay (ICSID Case No. ARB/10/7).

"We have no choice but to litigate" said Rees. The company said it has sought to dialogue with the government without success.

— Morgan Rees, Director Communications Regulatory Philip Morris International, in 2010.

"Philip Morris (which sued Uruguay for its anti smoking measures) wants to make an example to Uruguay and intimidate other countries."

— Tabaré Vázquez, November 2010.

Philip Morris has filed similar cases against Norway and Australia.

== Decision ==
On 2 July 2013, the tribunal decided it had jurisdiction.

The resolution of the case, which affected international jurisprudence, took 6 years; the case ended on 8 July 2016. The arbitral tribunal ruled in favor of Uruguay, forcing the demandant to pay the costs of the defendants and the court. The final report established that Philip Morris had to pay 7 million dollars to the country for judicial expenses, in addition to paying different amounts for the fees and administrative expenses of the three arbitrators and the CADI. Gary Born emitted a discordant decision in two of the points of the judicial failure.

After its victory in the case, the government declared that from 2017 cigarettes in Uruguay will be sold in generic packaging.

== Reactions ==
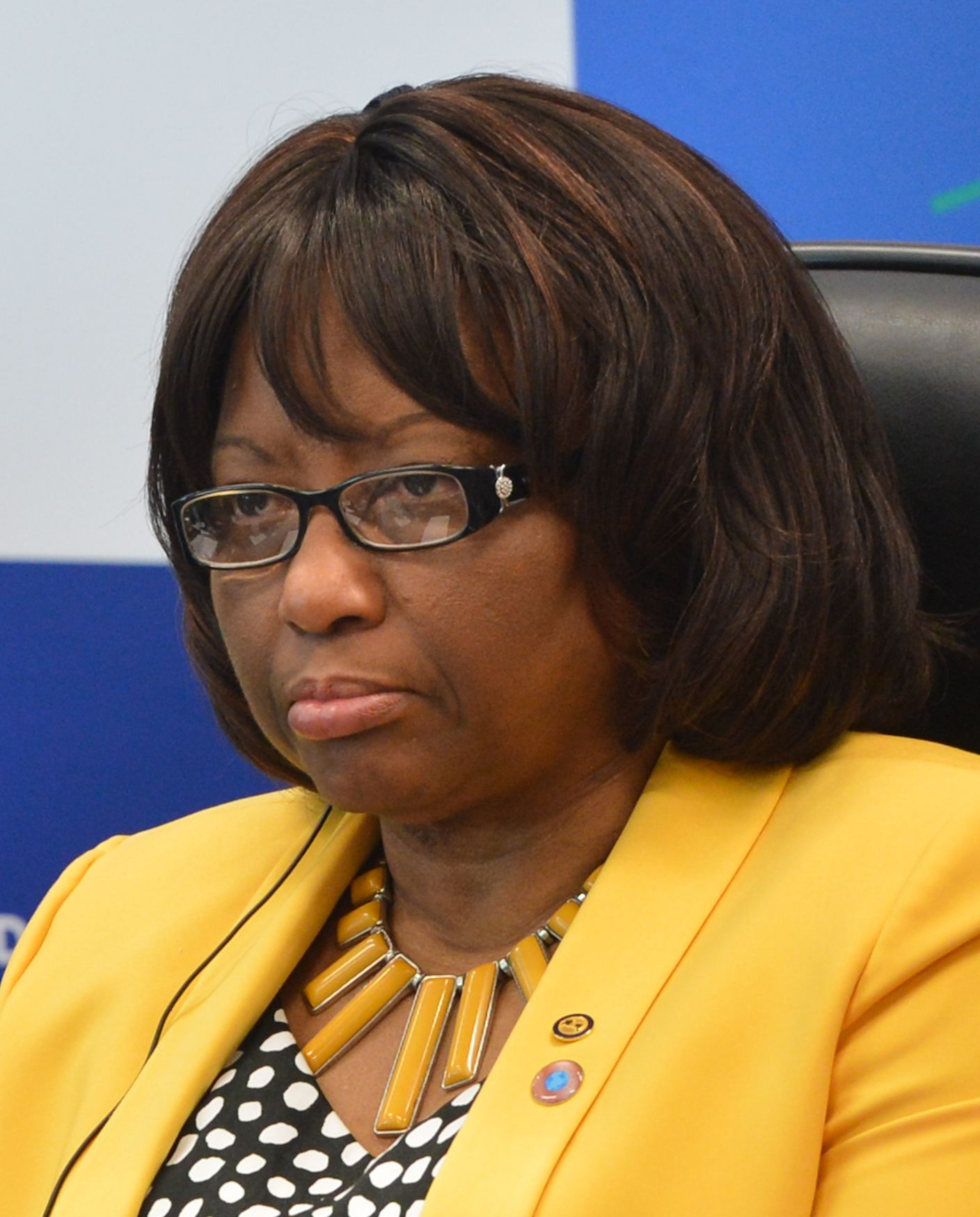
Carissa Etienne in 2015

The World Health Organization (WHO) and the Pan American Health Organization (PAHO) supported Uruguay. Uruguay's anti-smoking efforts also received support from past New York City Mayor Michael Bloomberg, and from Bernard Borel, Swiss deputy from the Canton of Vaud.

PAHO made a statement praising the decision:

"This decision is an acknowledgment of Uruguay's continued efforts to protect its population from tobacco use and tobacco smoke from others."

— Carissa Etienne, Director of the Pan American Health Organization, August 2016.

== Effects ==
According to Enrico Bonadio, Senior Lecturer in Law at City University London, the ruling in the case "may make it more difficult for tobacco companies to use lawsuits to produce a “chilling effect” and so discourage countries from introducing tobacco control policies."

== See also ==
- Plain tobacco packaging
- Smoking in Uruguay
