= Investor–state dispute settlement =

Rules for suing countries by foreign investors

Investor–state dispute settlement (ISDS), or an investment court system (ICS), is a set of rules through which states (sovereign nations) can be sued by foreign investors for certain state actions affecting the foreign direct investments (FDI) of that investor. This most often takes the form of international arbitration between the foreign investor and the state. As of June 2024, over US$113 billion has been paid by states to investors under ISDS, the vast majority of the money going to fossil fuel interests.

ISDS most often is an instrument of public international law, granting private parties (the foreign investors) the right to sue a state in a forum other than that state's domestic courts. Investors are granted this right through international investment agreements between the investor's home state and the host state. Such agreements can be found in bilateral investment treaties (BITs), international trade treaties such as the 2019 United States–Mexico–Canada Agreement, or other treaties like the 1991 Energy Charter Treaty.

To be allowed to bring an investor-state dispute before an arbitral tribunal, both the home state of the investor and the state where the investment was made must have agreed to ISDS, the investor from one state must have an investment in a foreign state and the foreign investor must put forward that the state has violated one or more of the rights granted to the investor under a certain treaty or agreement.

ISDS claims are often brought under the rules of the International Centre for Settlement of Investment Disputes (ICSID) of the World Bank, the London Court of International Arbitration (LCIA), the International Chamber of Commerce (ICC), the Hong Kong International Arbitration Centre (HKIAC), or the United Nations Commission on International Trade Law (UNCITRAL).

The ISDS system has been criticized for its perceived failures, including investor bias, inconsistent or inaccurate rulings, high damage awards, and high costs, and there have been widespread calls for reform. Since 2015, the European Union has been seeking to create a multilateral investment court to replace investor-state arbitration. Since 2017, multilateral negotiations for reform have been taking place in Working Group III of the United Nations Commission on International Trade Law.

== Foreign investment protection ==
=== Historical development ===
Hartley Shawcross and Hermann Josef Abs advocated for the creation of an international investor–state dispute settlement system after World War II. Abs saw it as a solution to unwanted nationalisations by states. The Treaty between the Federal Republic of Germany and Pakistan for the Promotion and Protection of Investments was concluded in 1959 and was the first investment protection treaty under international law. Under customary international law, an investor-state can vindicate injury caused by the host state by exercising diplomatic protection, which may include retorsion and/or reprisals. In addition to diplomatic protection, states can and do establish ad hoc commissions and arbitral tribunals to adjudicate claims involving treatment of foreign nationals and their property by the host state ("state-state-dispute-settlement" or SSDS), which can help avoid coercive resolutions and protect against reneging. Notable examples of this practice are the Jay Treaty commissions, the Iran–United States Claims Tribunal and the American-Mexican Claims Commission. However, these treaties were limited to the treatment of foreign investors during a past period of time, whereas modern ISDS allows investors to make claims against states in general and on a prospective basis.

=== Modern practice ===
As of 2024, the legal protection of foreign direct investment under public international law is guaranteed by a network of more than 2,750 bilateral investment treaties (BITs), multilateral investment treaties, such as the Energy Charter Treaty, and free trade agreements, such as the North American Free Trade Agreement (NAFTA). Most of these treaties were signed in the late 1980s and early 1990s before the increase of investor claims under the treaties began in the late 1990s.

The majority of the treaties provide foreign investors with substantive legal protection (including the right to "fair and equitable treatment", "full protection and security", "free transfer of means" and the right not to be directly or indirectly expropriated without full compensation) and access to ISDS for redress against host states for breaches of such protection. Some of these protections are framed in vague terms and give extensive discretion to arbitrators for their interpretation and application.

The overall number of ISDS cases reached 500 in 2012. Of these, 244 were concluded, of which 42% were decided in favor of the host state, 31% in favor of the investor, and 27% settled out of court.

Chapter 11 of NAFTA includes an Investor-State provision.

Foreign investors can sue states under investment treaties, but states cannot sue foreign investors, because only states are the parties to the treaty, and therefore only states can be held liable to pay damages for breach of the treaty. Thus, a decision in favor of the state means that the state does not pay compensation, not that it will receive compensation from the investor (although litigation costs can be awarded against the investor). A state that wishes to sue a foreign investor does so through the state's domestic courts.

Unlike the World Trade Organization, ISDS cannot overturn local laws which violate trade agreements, but the ISDS can grant monetary damages to investors adversely affected by such laws. According to the Office of the United States Trade Representative, ISDS requires specific treaty violations and does not allow corporations to sue solely for lost profits. Critics state that some treaties are written so that any legislation causing lost profits is by definition a treaty violation, rendering the argument null that only treaty violations are subject to ISDS.

Critics also state that government violations may be difficult to foresee, and the threat of exorbitant fines may cause a chilling effect which halts regulation or legislation in the public interest (e.g. human health and environmental protection).

==== NAFTA Chapter 11 ====
An example of ISDS is NAFTA Chapter 11. NAFTA went into effect in 1994 between the parties of Canada, Mexico, and the United States. Chapter 11 allows investors of one party to bring claims against another party before an international arbitral tribunal. NAFTA Chapter 11 was the first instance of an ISDS provision receiving widespread public attention, especially in the United States in the wake of the Methanex case.

=== Transatlantic Trade and Investment Partnership ===
Resistance from European Union to the US proposal to include an ISDS clause in the draft Transatlantic Trade and Investment Partnership (TTIP) treaty caused this clause to be removed from the draft treaty in September 2015. In its place, the European Commission proposed an investment court system (ICS). Not long afterwards, ICS was declared illegal by the German Association of Magistrates, though the Commission dismissed the magistrates' judgement as based on a misunderstanding. As of February 2016, the US wants an ISDS clause reinstated.

According to a 2019 study, ISDS is the single most important factor motivating opposition to TTIP among Germans.

== Debates and criticism ==
If you wanted to convince the public that international trade agreements are a way to let multinational companies get rich at the expense of ordinary people, this is what you would do: give foreign firms a special right to apply to a secretive tribunal of highly paid corporate lawyers for compensation whenever a government passes a law to, say, discourage smoking, protect the environment or prevent a nuclear catastrophe. Yet that is precisely what thousands of trade and investment treaties over the past half century have done, through a process known as 'investor-state dispute settlement', or ISDS.

— The Economist, October 2014

=== Local remedies ===
Because NAFTA Chapter 11 Article 1121 waives the 'local remedies' rule, investors are not required to exhaust local remedies before filing Chapter 11 claims. While this fact has been criticized, proponents of ISDS assert that speedy dispute resolution through ISDS is critical in modern economic environments and would be not possible if local remedies needed to be exhausted first. Critics argue that all other situations in international law require a private party to first show that the state's domestic courts are unreliable before the private party can sue the state. Factors in the growth of investment treaty claims since the late 1990s may have been the removal of duty to exhaust local remedies, as well as the growth in the number of bilateral free trade agreements since the breakdown of the multilateral WTO Doha round in the mid-2000s.

=== Regulatory capacity ===
Much debate and criticism has arisen concerning the impact of ISDS on the capacity of governments to implement reforms and legislative programs related to public health, environmental protection, and human rights.

In July 2023, David R. Boyd, the United Nations Special Rapporteur on human rights and the environment, found compelling evidence that ISDS has had a chilling effect on governments' ability to enact essential regulations to address the environmental crisis and the human rights crisis. Other critics argue that ISDS threatens democracy and the rule of law, in part because investor state claims (or the threat of them) inhibit the ability of domestic governments to pass legislation addressing public concerns, such as health and environmental protection, labor rights or human rights. For climate, Global ISDS Tracker reports that the $80 billion awarded to fossil fuel firms exceeds the total climate finance provided by developed countries for developing countries.

Proponents of ISDS argue that governments retain their regulatory ability if the agreements in question specify that regulations protecting health, the environment, labor rights, and human rights are allowed. The International Bar Association (IBA) states that "while investment treaties limit states' ability to inflict arbitrary or discriminatory treatment, they do not limit (and, in fact, expressly safeguard) a state's sovereign right to regulate in the public interest in a fair, reasonable, and non-discriminatory manner." The Office of the United States Trade Representative similarly states that "ISDS does nothing that takes away the sovereign ability of governments [to] impose any measure they wish to protect labor rights, the environment, or other issues of public welfare." The White House notes that investment protections are a component of more than 3,000 trade agreements, the vast majority of which have some form of neutral arbitration. As of February 2015, the United States is party to at least 50 such agreements, has only faced 13 ISDS cases and has never lost an ISDS case.

In a February 2016 op-ed against the Trans-Pacific Partnership (TPP), U.S. Senator Elizabeth Warren used the example of a French company suing Egypt because Egypt raised its minimum wage, as an argument against the ISDS provisions of the TPP. The editorial board of The Washington Post noted that "Veolia of France, a waste management company, invoked ISDS to enforce a contract with the government of Alexandria, Egypt, that it says required compensation if costs increased; the company maintains that the wage increases triggered this provision. The case — which would result, at most, in a monetary award to Veolia, not the overthrow of the minimum wage — remains in litigation."

According to the International Bar Association (IBA), as of June 2017, states have won a higher percentage of ISDS cases than investors, and that around one-third of all cases end in settlement. Claimant investors, when successful, recover on average less than half of the amounts claimed. IBA notes that "only 8 per cent of ISDS proceedings are commenced by very large multinational corporations." IBA challenges the notion that ISDS is biased against developing countries, noting that there is "no correlation between the success rates of claims against states and their income levels or development status". IBA notes that ISDS is necessary even in countries with sophisticated domestic legal systems because those domestic courts rule according to domestic laws, not international law. IBA notes that "increasingly, awards require the losing party to pay arbitration costs and legal fees to the winning party", which deters investors from initiating unmeritorious cases.

A 2017 study found that the success rate of investors in investor-state disputes has sharply fallen over time because most legal challenges today seek compensation for regulation implemented by democracies, not expropriation by non-democracies. The author of the study argues that the likely goal of investors is not to obtain compensation through ISDS, but to impose costs on governments contemplating regulations and therefore deter the regulatory ambitions of governments. A 2019 study shows that ISDS clauses consistently sparks significant public opposition to treaties. This trend is observed irrespective of individuals' various characteristics, such as their skill levels, access to information, and national sentiments, which are typically considered crucial factors influencing trade attitudes.

=== Social movements and local populations ===
In 117 ISDS cases, the foreign corporate activity, for example, fossil fuel drilling or other mineral extraction, was protested by a social movement or the local community affected. The foreign corporations often initiate litigation under ISDS to fight back against putting a halt to the activities.

=== Economic impact ===
The Peterson Institute for International Economics (PIIE) claimed in 2015 that ISDS provisions are necessary, as they boost investment: "empirical evidence has shown that treaties including these provisions have a positive effect on foreign direct investment (FDI) flows between signatory countries." On the other hand, Hallward-Driemeier (2003) analyzed the impact of Bilateral Investment Treaties (BITs) and, after conducting several tests with different dependent variables – absolute amount of FDI, the ratio of FDI to host country's gross domestic product (GDP) and the share of host country's FDI in total FDI outflows of a home country – concluded that BITs do not serve to attract additional FDI. Additionally, Emma Aisbett (2007) found "no evidence for the claim that BITs signal a safe investment climate". Yackee (2007) also concluded that "the apparently positive effect of BITs on FDI largely (and in some cases entirely) falls from significance", which is consistent with empirical findings that "potential investors seem to have little awareness or appreciation of specific BITs".

The impact of FDI on the GDP of developing economies is, itself, a matter of research. While some research (Olofsdotter, 1998; Reisen and Soto, 2001) finds a positive impact on developing countries, other authors (Mencinger, 2003; Carkovic and Levine, 2005; Johnson, 2006; Türkcan, Duman, and Yetkiner, 2008; Herzer, 2012) find a negative impact, and some (De Mello, 1999) find the data to be inconclusive. A fourth conclusion was proposed by others (Alfaro et al., 2004; Li and Liu, 2005; Batten and Vo, 2009): FDI may have a positive or negative impact on the GDP of developing economies depending on the existence of adequate policies to "filter" speculative or predatory investment. Thus, opponents of ISDS warn that these systems may harm the government's ability to filter FDI more favorable to development, and therefore harm GDP. The Cato Institute warns that the creation of a two-tier justice system, by which foreign investors are subject to a set of rules different from domestic investors, apart from being contrary to the principle of the Rule of Law, is itself a market distortion prone to inefficiencies that are bound to harm GDP.

Finally, opponents of ISDS also argue that these systems increase inequalities, harm public services, threaten labor and consumer protections, threaten financial stability and the environment, all of which have significant economic consequences.

=== Conflicts of Interests ===
PIIE challenges the claim that ISDS "arbitrators lack integrity", noting that arbitrators take an oath of impartiality and both sides of a case choose arbitrators.

Critics argue that, in addition to the system lacking safeguards regarding individual abuse, the most important problem is systemic. These critics note that arbitrators are paid on a case-by-case basis, and therefore they are personally benefited by an increase in claims. Because governments may not use the ISDS system to sue investors, if arbitrators have any bias toward investors, this will encourage further claims and the arbitrators will personally benefit financially. The vague terms of most BITs allow this kind of bias regarding the interpretation of treaties by arbitrators. This bias, fueled by the conflict of interest in the core of the system (that need not assume any lack of integrity on a personal level on the arbitrators side, but solely the cognitive difficulty in overcoming a bias when one's personal interest is at stake) may help explain the significant growth in the number of ISDS cases in the 2000s and 2010s.

=== Transparency ===
Opponents of ISDS argue that arbitrations are sometimes carried out in secret by trade lawyers who do not enjoy the typical safeguards of judicial independence and procedural fairness, who earn income only if a case is brought and proceeds, and who are not accountable to the public or required to take into account broader constitutional and international law human rights norms. PIIE agrees "that secrecy has gone too far" in many ISDS cases, but notes that agreements such as the Trans-Pacific Partnership did ensure greater transparency in ISDS. Proponents of ISDS point out that confidentiality is a standard feature of all arbitration and one that enables a constructive, de-politicized and fact-oriented atmosphere of dispute resolution. On the other hand, such traditional confidentiality is limited to disputes that affect the parties in question and not the broader public. Also, most ICSID awards, although confidential, are de facto published by consent of the parties. However, many awards under other arbitration rules are not public and, in the case of investor-arbitration at the ICC, there is a requirement for blanket confidentiality for all aspects of a case.

It is further pointed out that judges are not elected in most countries outside the US, so that "public accountability of judges" may not be considered a standard of public international law. In any event, they say, the qualification of ISDS arbitrators matches or exceeds the qualification of most court judges. In response, critics make the point that any judge, whether domestic or international, who is part of a legal system not shown to be systematically biased or unreliable, has a greater claim to independence than an arbitrator because they are insulated from conflicts of interest that arise when arbitrators work on the side as lawyers, and is assigned cases in an objective manner rather than by the discretion of a disputing party or an executive official. Arbitrators are appointed by both parties at dispute, so such conflicts of interest may arise on both sides.

While ISDS has traditionally been confidential as any other arbitration, the general trend in the last decade has been to allow for more openness and transparency. On the other hand, there is still widespread confidentiality in the system.

Under Art. 29 of the U.S. Model-BIT of 2004, all documents pertaining to ISDS have to be made public and amicus curiae briefs are allowed. However, no investment treaty allows other parties who have an interest in the dispute, other than the claimant investor and respondent government, to obtain standing in the adjudicative process.

Under the Trans-Pacific Strategic Economic Partnership, the tribunals shall, subject to the consent of the disputing parties, conduct hearings open to the public. The tribunal will make available to the public documents relating to the dispute such as the notice of intent, the notice of arbitration, pleadings, memorials, minutes or transcripts of the hearings of the tribunal, where available; orders, awards and decisions of the tribunal. In addition, third parties can and increasingly do participate in investor-state arbitration by submitting amicus curiae petitions.

The World Bank's International Centre for the Settlement of Investment Disputes (ICSID) is required by ICSID Administrative and Financial Regulation 22 to make public, information on the registration of all requests for arbitration and to indicate in due course the date and method of the termination of each proceeding. It also publishes the vast majority of awards with the consent of the parties. If the parties do not consent, ICSID publishes excerpts showing the tribunal's reasoning. The ICSID website has published awards for most completed arbitrations, and decisions in investor-state arbitrations outside of ICSID are also publicly available online.

On 1 April 2014, the UNCITRAL Rules on Transparency in Treaty-based Investor-State Arbitration entered into force. Article 3 foresees a general duty to publish all documents pertaining to an ISDS-procedure under UNCITRAL Rules, where the treaty establishing the ISDS-mechanism has been concluded after 1 April 2014 or where the parties so consent, subject to certain overwhelming confidentiality interests listed in Article 7. Original proposals to make all UNCITRAL arbitration under investment treaties public were not adopted after opposition by some states and by representatives of the arbitration industry who participated in the UNCITRAL working group negotiations as state representatives.

On 17 March 2015, the United Nations Convention on Transparency in Treaty-based Investor-State Arbitration ('Mauritius Convention') was opened for signatures in Port Louis, Mauritius. The Mauritius Convention will render the UNCITRAL Rules on Transparency in Treaty-based Investor State Arbitration also applicable to disputes arising out of investment treaties that were concluded prior to 1 April 2014 if both parties to the investment treaty are also party to the Mauritius Convention. The convention has not yet entered into force since the three required ratifications have not yet been submitted. 10 States have signed the Mauritius Convention so far.

=== Reciprocity ===
Development under the draft Pan-African Investment Code, envisaged strengthening the role of defending states by allowing them to initiate counter-claims against investors.

A counter-claim may be a way of rebalancing investment law, by allowing states to file claims against investors, as a means to sanction investor misconduct.

== Tribunals ==
Investment disputes can be initiated by corporations and natural persons and in almost all cases, investment tribunals are composed of three arbitrators (unless otherwise agreed by the parties). As in most arbitrations, one is appointed by the investor, one by the state, and the third is usually chosen by agreement between the parties or their appointed arbitrators or selected by the appointing authority, depending on the procedural rules applicable to the dispute. If the parties do not agree who to appoint, this power is assigned to executive officials usually at the World Bank, the International Bureau of the Permanent Court of Arbitration, or a private chamber of commerce.

Other individuals cannot initiate a claim against a state under an investment treaty. Also, no individual or state can initiate a claim against a foreign investor under an investment treaty. This has led to criticisms that investor-state arbitration is not balanced and that it favours the "haves" over the "have nots" by giving foreign investors, especially major companies, access to a special tribunal outside any court. While the arbitration process itself does not provide explicitly privileged access for larger investors over individuals or SMEs, the costs of ISDS, as in any court or arbitration system, tend to be off-putting for smaller claimants.

== Examples ==
According to a 2011 paper, "In terms of wins and losses, [the] U.S. has never lost a case as the respondent country. U.S. investors have won 15 cases, lost 22 cases and settled 14 cases. In terms of performance with respect to developing countries, U.S. investors have won 14 cases and lost 17." Lord Livingston, the UK's Minister of State for Trade and Investment, reported in 2015 that the UK was involved in 94 existing ISDS agreements and "had not lost a single case".

=== Cases lost by governments ===
S.D. Myers v. Canada

Between 1995 and 1997 the Canadian government banned the export of toxic PCB waste, in order to comply with its obligations under the Basel Convention, of which the United States is not a party. Waste treatment company S.D. Myers then sued the Canadian government under NAFTA Chapter 11 for $20 million in damages. The claim was upheld by a NAFTA Tribunal in 2000.

Occidental v. Ecuador

In October 2012, an ICSID tribunal awarded a judgment of $1.8 billion for Occidental Petroleum against the government of Ecuador. Additionally, Ecuador had to pay $589 million in backdated compound interest and half of the costs of the tribunal, making its total penalty around $2.4 billion. The South American country annulled a contract with the oil firm on the grounds that it violated a clause that the company would not sell its rights to another firm without permission. The tribunal agreed the violation took place but judged that the annulment was not fair and equitable treatment to the company.

Ethyl Corporation v. Canada

In April 1997 the Canadian parliament banned the import and transport of MMT, a gasoline additive, over concerns that it poses a significant public health risk. Ethyl Corporation, the additive's manufacturer, sued the Canadian government under NAFTA Chapter 11 for $251 million, to cover losses resulting from the "expropriation" of both its MMT production plant and its "good reputation".

A similar challenge was launched by three Canadian provinces, under the Agreement on Internal Trade, and was upheld by a Canadian dispute settlement panel. Consequently, the Canadian government repealed the ban and paid Ethyl Corporation $15 million as compensation.

Dow AgroSciences v. Canada

On 25 August 2008, Dow AgroSciences LLC, a U.S. corporation, served a Notice of Intent to Submit a Claim to Arbitration under Chapter 11 of NAFTA, for losses allegedly caused by a Quebec ban on the sale and certain uses of lawn pesticides containing the active ingredient 2,4-D. The tribunal issued a consent award as the parties to the dispute reached a settlement.

=== Cases won by governments ===
Apotex v. the United States

Under Chapter 11 of NAFTA, Apotex Inc., a Canadian pharmaceuticals corporation, has alleged that U.S. courts committed errors in interpreting federal law, and that such errors were in violation of NAFTA Article 1102 (national treatment) and Article 1105 (minimum standard of treatment under international law). Apotex also alleged that the challenged U.S. court decision in favor of the Pfizer drug company expropriated Apotex's investments in generic versions of the antidepressant Zoloft under NAFTA Article 1110 as was manifestly unjust.

Apotex relied on the doctrine that a manifestly unjust domestic legal decision breaches international law and can be viewed as a substantive denial of justice. Apotex has also brought a similar claim involving U.S. regulatory provisions concerning an abbreviated new drug development application for Pravastatin and patents allegedly held by Bristol Myers Squibb. Apotex has two claims involving different generic products. On 14 June 2013, the Tribunal issued an Award on Jurisdiction and Admissibility, dismissing all of the claims and ordering Apotex to pay the United States' legal fees and arbitral expenses.

Chemtura Corporation v. Canada

Chemtura Corporation, a United States agricultural pesticide products manufacturer, alleged that the Canadian government's Pest Management Regulatory Agency (PMRA) wrongfully terminated its pesticide business in lindane-based products, which are used on canola, rapeseed, mustard seed and cole crops to control flea beetle infestations, and on cereal crops to control wireworm. Chemtura alleged NAFTA violations of Article 1105 (on minimum standards of treatment) and Article 1110 (on expropriation). All claims were dismissed by the Tribunal, given that the measure did not amount to a substantial deprivation of the Claimant's investment and was taken legitimately and without bad faith.

Philip Morris v. Uruguay

The Philip Morris v. Uruguay case (Spanish: es:Caso Philip Morris contra Uruguay) started on 19 February 2010, when the multinational tobacco company Philip Morris International filed a complaint against Uruguay seeking $25 million in damages. The company complained that Uruguay's anti-smoking legislation devalued its cigarette trademarks and investments in the country and based its lawsuit on the bilateral investment treaty between Switzerland and Uruguay. The International Centre for Settlement of Investment Disputes (ICSID), a part of the World Bank decided it had jurisdiction on 2 July 2013, and three years later ruled in favor of Uruguay, ordering Philip Morris to pay Uruguay $7 million, in addition to all court costs.

=== Dismissed cases ===
KT Asia Investment Group v. Kazakhstan

The claimant (company incorporated in The Netherlands) was a shell company owned by Kazakh national (Mr. Ablyazov). It owned shares in BTA Bank, which the claimant alleged were nationalized by the respondent (Kazakhstan). The state position was that as owned by a Kazakh national the claimant was not eligible for investment protection under the Dutch-Kazakh BIT. This argument was dismissed by the Arbitrage. The Kazakh state then alleged that it didn't nationalize the bank, but it bailed it out (wiping out the shares' value in the process). The latter was due to the embezzlement of depositors' trust (and funds) by Mr. Ablyazov. Investigating the matter the Arbitrage reached the conclusion that the investment doesn't meet the Salini test, thus it is not protected under the BIT. As a result the Arbitrage decided it has no jurisdiction to decide the dispute.

== Prospects for ISDS ==
After ISDS claims by investors sharply increased starting in the late 1990s, ISDS came under greater public attention and criticism, in particular NAFTA claims against the United States in the late 1990s, Philip Morris's claim against Australia in 2011, and Vattenfall's claim against Germany in 2016.

In 2011, the Australian government announced that it would discontinue the practice of seeking inclusion of investor-state dispute settlement provisions in trade agreements with developing countries. It stated that it:

"...supports the principle of national treatment — that foreign and domestic businesses are treated equally under the law. However, the Government does not support provisions that would confer greater legal rights on foreign businesses than those available to domestic businesses. Nor will the Government support provisions that would constrain the ability of Australian governments to make laws on social, environmental and economic matters in circumstances where those laws do not discriminate between domestic and foreign businesses. The Government has not and will not accept provisions that limit its capacity to put health warnings or plain packaging requirements on tobacco products or its ability to continue the Pharmaceutical Benefits Scheme... In the past, Australian Governments have sought the inclusion of investor-state dispute resolution procedures in trade agreements with developing countries at the behest of Australian businesses. The Gillard Government will discontinue this practice. If Australian businesses are concerned about sovereign risk in Australian trading partner countries, they will need to make their own assessments about whether they want to commit to investing in those countries... Foreign businesses investing in Australia will be entitled to the same legal protections as domestic businesses but the Gillard Government will not confer greater rights on foreign businesses through investor-state dispute resolution provisions."

This statement is a reaction to Philip Morris' ISDS claim under UNCITRAL rules to challenge Australian tobacco Advertising Restrictions. By 2013, Australia had not terminated any bilateral investment treaties allowing for ISDS. Even if it were to do so, most such treaties foresee post-termination-protection for many years after the termination has become effective. In any event, since the election of the conservative Coalition Government in 2013, the Government has entered into free trade agreements (such as the China-Australia Free Trade Agreement, Ch 9 section B) that include ISDS.

An alternative way ahead may be the preservation of investor protection under public international law, including ISDS, but with more concern for transparency and the balancing of economic and non-economic interests. As noted above, the European Commission proposed September 2015 an 'Investment Court System' to replace ISDS clauses (notably in the draft TTIP), with the scope for investor challenge much reduced and with 'highly skilled judges' rather than arbitrators used to determine cases.

In this vein, Karel De Gucht, the EU commissioner in charge of negotiating International Investment Agreements declared on 18 December 2014 that future agreements shall become more transparent, shall "fully enshrine democratic prerogatives" and "explicitly state that legitimate government public policy decisions – on issues such as the balance between public and private provision of healthcare or "the European ban on chicken carcasses washed with chlorine" – cannot be over-ridden". He announced to "crack down on companies using legal technicalities to build frivolous cases against governments", to "open up investment tribunals to public scrutiny – documents will be public and interested parties, including NGOs, will be able to make submissions". Also, he said, the EU "will eliminate any conflicts of interest – the arbitrators who decide on EU cases must be above suspicion". However, insisting equally on the advantages of such investment protection agreements, he states along that [they] "protect job-creating investment from discrimination and unfair treatment" and that "the task here is to find the right balance between preventing abuse and protecting investments".

Current controversies over ISDS appear driven by attempts to expand its scope to new countries and, especially, to relations between developed countries with mature court systems and democratic governments.

In 2014, several members of the United States House of Representatives expressed opposition to the inclusion of ISDS in the proposed Transatlantic Trade and Investment Partnership (TTIP) between the United States and the European Union. In 2015, faced with opposition to ISDS in several European countries, the European Parliament adopted a resolution requiring any new dispute settlement scheme included in TTIP "must be replaced by a new public and transparent system of investment protection, in which private interests cannot undermine public policy and which is subject to public law". (The commission's 2015 proposal in response is noted above).

South Africa has stated it will withdraw from treaties with ISDS clauses, and India is also considering such a position. Indonesia plans to let treaties with ISDS clauses lapse when they need renewal. Brazil has refused any treaty with ISDS clauses.

In 2018, the Court of Justice of the European Union ruled that "The arbitration clause in the Agreement between The Netherlands and Slovakia on the protection of investments is not compatible with EU law". This ruling could imply that any similar arbitration tribunal considering corporate sovereignty cases would also be illegal under EU law.

It was suggested before the UK left the EU (known as Brexit) that the process might generate ISDS cases against the UK. For example, non-EU financial firms which had based themselves in the City of London in the expectation of continued participation in the European Single Market and subsequently having suffered adverse consequences of the loss of such access under different arrangements, could have an actionable case against the UK Government.

== See also ==
- Arbitration
- Bilateral investment treaty – Treaty for interstate private investment
- Comprehensive Economic and Trade Agreement – 2016 Canada–EU free trade agreement
- Energy Charter Treaty – Multilateral agreement for energy
- International Centre for Settlement of Investment Disputes – International arbitration institution affiliated with the World Bank (ICSID)
- International investment agreement – Treaty on interstate investments
- Philip Morris v. Uruguay – Arbitration case on smoking regulations
- Trans-Pacific Partnership – 2016 proposed trade agreement (TPP)
- Transatlantic Trade and Investment Partnership – Proposed free trade agreement between the EU and the US (TTIP)
- United Nations Commission on International Trade Law – Trade law body of the UN (UNCITRAL)
