= Anna Joubin-Bret =

French lawyer (born 1962)

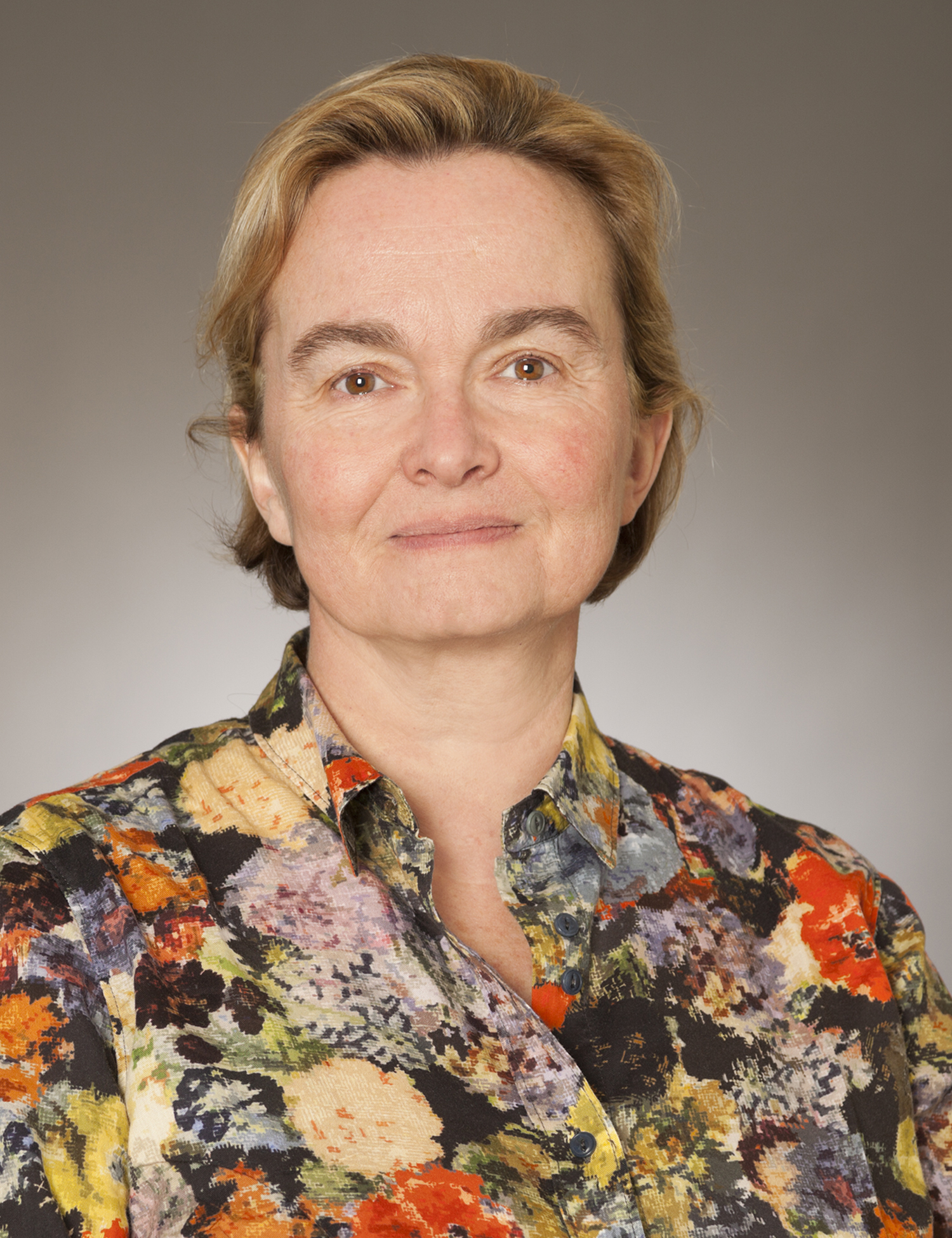
- Born: 2 February 1962 (age 64)
- Employer: United Nations Commission on International Trade Law

Anna Joubin-Bret (born 2 February 1962) is a French lawyer. She is the Secretary of the United Nations Commission on International Trade Law (UNCITRAL) and Director of the International Trade Law Division (ITLD) in the Office of Legal Affairs (OLA) of the UN Secretariat since 2017.

== Education ==
In 1985, she obtained an M.A. in International Commercial Law and a Diplôme d'études approfondies in Private International Law at the Université Paris 1 Panthéon-Sorbonne. From 1979 to 1982, Joubin-Bret completed a B.A. in International Relations at the Institut d'Études Politiques (Sciences-Po) and a B.A. in Private Law at the University of Lyon III Jean-Moulin.

== Career ==
Joubin-Bret started her career in 1983 as a junior counsel in the legal department of the Schneider Group. In 1984, she became general counsel for the French technology group KIS. From 1986 to 1994, she was the Director of the Export Division of the French cable car manufacturer Pomagalski S.A. She began working for the United Nations Conference on Trade and Development (UNCTAD) in Geneva, first as a consultant and later as Senior Legal Advisor from 1996 to 2011.

In January 2012, she was admitted to the Paris bar and became a partner in the Paris office of the US law firm Foley Hoag LLP, specializing in business law and in international commercial and investment arbitration. She set up Cabinet Joubin-Bret in May 2013 and from there acted as counsel and arbitrator in mediation and arbitration proceedings under the rules of the International Chamber of Commerce (ICC), International Centre for the Settlement of Investment Disputes (ICSID) and UNCITRAL. She advised governments in international investment negotiations and disputes.

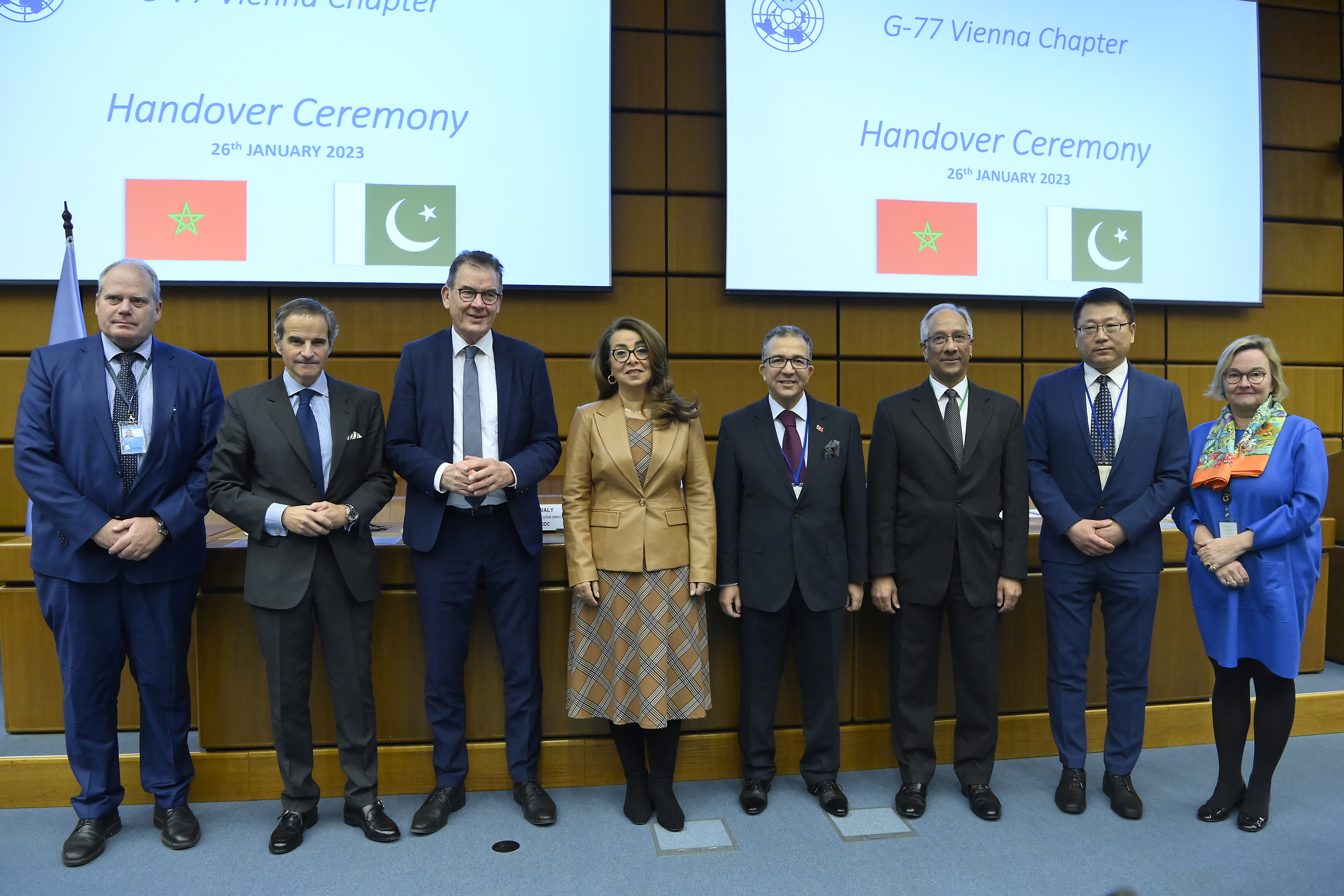
G77 Hand-over Ceremony in 2023 (at far right)

In March 1998, she was elected Regional Counsellor for the Rhône-Alpes region. She served as judge at the Commercial Court in Grenoble (France). She was designated to the list of Conciliators of the Chairman of ICSID from 2010-2016 and to the list of arbitrators of several arbitration centers.

Joubin-Bret has taught commercial law at universities and institutes. She is the author and editor of numerous publications on arbitration, international trade and investment law.

In November 2017, Joubin-Bret became the ninth Secretary of the United Nations Commission on International Trade Law (UNCITRAL) and Director of the International Trade Law Division (ITLD) of the Office of Legal Affairs (OLA) of the UN Secretariat.
