= Jan Paulsson =

- Education: Harvard University (BA); Yale Law School (JD); University of Paris
- Occupation: Lawyer
- Employer(s): University of Miami School of Law & International Monetary Fund

Jan Paulsson is a Swedish scholar and practitioner in the area of international arbitration.

== Early life ==
Paulsson received his A.B. from Harvard University in 1971, his J.D. from Yale Law School in 1975, where he was an editor of the Yale Law Journal, and a Diplôme d’etudes supérieurs spécialisées from the University of Paris in 1977.

== Career ==
Paulsson was co-head of the international arbitration and public international law groups of Freshfields Bruckhaus Deringer LLP, and helped found Three Crowns LLP, a boutique international arbitration firm. In December 2020, Three Crowns announced his retirement from the firm.

Paulsson is the Chair of the International Arbitration LL.M. program at the University of Miami School of Law and a holder of the Michael Klein Distinguished Scholar Chair.

Between 2011 and 2019, he also served as a judge of the International Monetary Fund's Administrative Tribunal.

He has been a member of the Permanent Court of Arbitration in The Hague since 2008. He was re-elected in 2023.
