= Smoking in Uruguay =

Smoking in Uruguay in enclosed public spaces became illegal on 1 March 2006. On that date, bars, restaurants or offices where people are caught smoking began facing fines of more than $1,100 or a three-day closure. Uruguay was the first country in Latin America to ban smoking in enclosed public spaces.

Anti-smoking groups estimate that as many as a third of Uruguay's 3.4 million people smoke. Uruguayan President Tabaré Vázquez, an oncologist, has cited reports suggesting about seven people die each day in Uruguay from smoking-related causes including lung cancer, emphysema and other illnesses.

To help promote the plan, president Vazquez launched a campaign called "A Million Thanks," which is a reference to the number of Uruguayan smokers. So far, the campaign seems to have won these people over, as an opinion poll conducted by the Ministry of Public Health states that close to 70% of the country's smokers support the legislation.

The president was the impetus behind the government-decreed measure, which is among the world’s toughest and is similar to bans already in place in Ireland, Sweden, and Norway.

== History ==
The history of tobacco companies in Uruguay begins with the creation of the Compañía Industrial de Tabacos Monte Paz S.A., founded in 1880. It represented the brands: Nevada, Coronado and California, among others. In 1945, the company Abal Hermanos S.A. appeared as representative of the brands: Marlboro, Benson & Hedges, Silver Mint, Philip Morris, Casino, Next and L&M. British American Tobacco (BAT) was selling tobacco as well as cigarettes, before retiring from Uruguay on 21 April 2010, when it represented the Kent, Kool, Lucky Strike and Pall Mall brands.

In 2022, president Luis Lacalle Pou signed a decree rolling back some policies against smoking despite warnings by the Faculty of Medicine and the Center for Research on the Tobacco Epidemic.

== See also ==
- Philip Morris v. Uruguay
