= Gary Born =

American lawyer (born 1955)

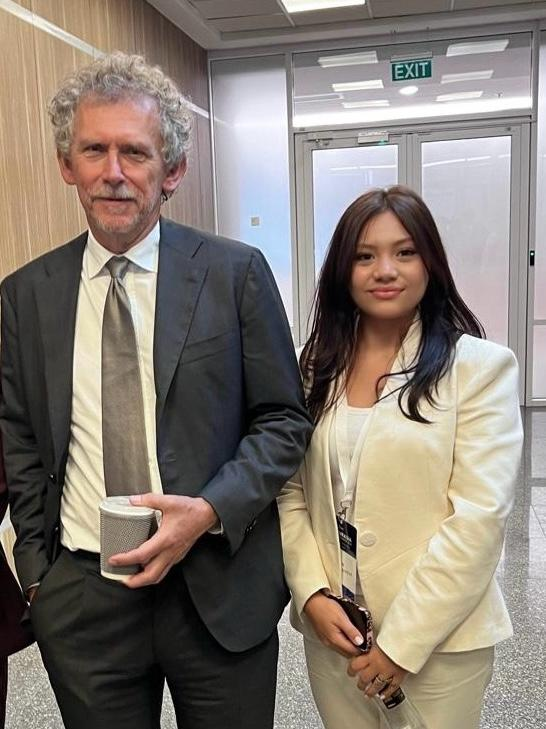
- Born: September 14, 1955 (age 71); United States
- Education: Haverford College (BA); University of Pennsylvania (JD)
- Occupations: lawyer, author

Gary B. Born (born September 14, 1955) is an American lawyer. He was the chair of the International Arbitration and International Litigation practices at the international law firm Wilmer Cutler Pickering Hale and Dorr LLP, and joined King & Spalding in 2026 as a Partner in its Disputes group. He is also the author of various commentaries, casebooks and other works on international arbitration and international litigation.

== Early life and education ==
Born attended primary schools in France and Germany and completed his secondary education in the United States. He received a bachelor's degree, summa cum laude, from Haverford College in 1978 and a J.D., summa cum laude, from the University of Pennsylvania Law School in 1981.

Born served as a law clerk to Judge Henry Friendly of the U.S. Court of Appeals for the Second Circuit (1981–1982) and Justice William Rehnquist of the U.S. Supreme Court (1982–1983). Born has practiced with Wilmer Cutler Pickering Hale and Dorr LLP in London for the past several decades and has taught international dispute resolution at law schools in Europe, the United States, Asia, the Middle East and elsewhere.

== Scholarship ==
Born's three volume treatise on International Commercial Arbitration, currently in its third edition, is cited as the standard text in the field of international arbitration. International Commercial Arbitration provides a detailed treatment of the subject of international commercial arbitration agreements, procedures and awards, and proposes theories regarding the global legal regime for international arbitration and the constitutional status of the 1958 New York Convention (United Nations Convention on Recognition and Enforcement of Foreign Arbitral Awards). International Commercial Arbitration is frequenty relied upon by apex courts in leading jurisdictions around the world, including the United States, Canada, the United Kingdom, India, Singapore, Switzerland, Australia, the Netherlands and Hong Kong.

Born has also written on international litigation. His commentary and materials on International Civil Litigation in United States Courts is in its seventh edition. The work is a reference work on international litigation and was the foundational text on the field in the United States: (Note: See Minear, International Civil Litigation in United States Courts, Commentary and Materials (Second Edition), 35 Harv. Int'l. L. J. 251 (1994) ("...a textbook that is defining the law school course of 'International Civil Litigation' in much the same way as Henry M. Hart, Jr. and Herbert Wechsler defined the course of 'Federal Courts.'"); Curtis A. Bradley and Jack L. Goldsmith III, International Civil Litigation in United States Courts: Cases and Materials (Second Edition), 34 Va. J. Int'l L. 233 (1993–1994) ("When International Civil Litigation in the United States Courts was first published in 1989, it was the only casebook (and one of the first hornbooks) to present a 'comprehensive treatment' of the 'emerging field' of international civil litigation. Now in its second edition, [Gary Born's International Civil Litigation] is recognized by many as the standard general work in the field... the best general hornbook on the subject."); McLachlan, International Litigation and the Reworking of the Conflict of Laws, L.Q.R. 2004, 120 (OCT), 580; Burbank, The World in our Courts: Gary B. Born and David Westin, International Civil Litigation in United States Courts; Commentary and Materials, 89 Mich. L. Rev. 1456 et seq.(1990–1991); Harold Hongju Koh, International Civil Litigation in United States Courts, 100 Yale L.J. 2347 (1990–1991) ("'[t]he best current compendium' regarding international civil litigation."); American Society of International Law, The Future of Transnational Litigation in US Courts: Distinct Field or Footnote? Panel discussion at ASIL 101st Annual Meeting, 2007) International Civil Litigation is frequently relied upon by US judicial decisions, including the US Supreme Court and various Courts of Appeals. (Note: J. McIntyre Machinery, Ltd v. Nicastro, 131 S.Ct. 2780 (2011); Asahi Metal Indus. Co. Ltd. v. Superior Court of California, 480 U.S. 102 (1987); Hartford Fire Ins. Co. v. Cal., 509 U.S. 764 (U.S. 1993); Saudi Arabia v. Nelson, 507 U.S. 349 (1993); J. McIntyre Machinery, Ltd. v. Nicastro, 2011 WL 2518811 (U.S. 2011); United Phosphorus, Ltd. v. Angus Chem. Co., 322 F.3d 942 (7th Cir. 2003); United States v. Swiss Am. Bank, Ltd., 191 F.3d 30 (1st Cir. 1999); Kuenzle v. HTM Sport-Und Freizeitgerate AG, 102 F.3d 453 (10th Cir. 1996); Allendale Mut. Ins. Co. v. Bull Data Sys., 10 F.3d 425 (7th Cir. 1993))

Born has also authored casebooks on international arbitration (including International Arbitration: Cases and Materials (Aspen 2010) and International Commercial Arbitration: Commentary and Materials (Kluwer 2001)) and works on international dispute resolution (including International Arbitration and Forum Selection Agreements: Drafting and Enforcing (Kluwer 4th ed. 2013) and International Arbitration: Law and Practice (Kluwer 2012)).

Born's treatise International Commercial Arbitration was awarded the American Society of International Law's Certificate of Merit for 2010 and was voted the 2009 "IDR-Related Book of the Year" by the Oil-Gas-Energy-Mining-Infrastructure Dispute Management (OGEMID) network. Born again received the OGEMID "Book of the Year" award in 2010 for his International Arbitration and Forum Selection Agreements: Drafting and Enforcing. He also received the Smit-Lowenfeld Prize of the International Arbitration Club of New York.

== Representations ==
Born is an advocate in the fields of international arbitration, international litigation and public international law. He has participated as counsel in more than 725 international commercial or investment arbitrations, including several of the largest institutional and ad hoc arbitrations in recent decades (see below) and sat as arbitrator in more than 250 international arbitrations. In 2006, Born was chosen by his peers as the "World's Best International Litigator" in a survey by Legal Media Group. He was the recipient of the inaugural "Advocate of the Year" award by the Global Arbitration Review in 2011, starred status in Chambers Global from 2009 through the present, and the International Lawyer of the Year in 2014-20 and 2024.

Born has represented a diversity of clients. He has represented multinational corporate groups in a number of major international commercial and other arbitrations during the past decade. These included disputes involving Deutsche Telekom and Vivendi and France Telecom, Repsol and Atlantic LNG 2/3, Shell Petroleum, Volkswagen, and others.

Born acted as lead counsel in the Abyei Arbitration, conducted under the auspices of the Permanent Court of Arbitration (PCA) in the Hague at the Peace Palace. He represented the Sudan People's Liberation Movement/Army (SPLM/A) in the arbitration, implementing the 2005 Comprehensive Peace Agreement, between the Government of Sudan and SPLM/A. The Abyei Arbitration had its oral hearings being open to the public and web-cast live around the world. Born's closing submissions in the Arbitration and the Tribunal Award can be viewed on the website of the PCA. Born represented the State of Eritrea against Yemen in an arbitration under PCA auspices concerning territorial sovereignty over a number of islands in the Red Sea. Born also represented Greenpeace in an arbitration against the Republic of France, concerning the Rainbow Warrior incident. The arbitration concluded with an award of damages in favor of Greenpeace.

Born has sat as arbitrator in more than 250 institutional and ad hoc arbitrations, including both international commercial and investment arbitrations. Born was a member of the arbitral tribunal in Biwater Gauff v. Republic of Tanzania, which issued an order setting forth guidelines on transparency and confidentiality in investor-state arbitrations. He was also a member of the arbitral tribunal in Philip Morris v. Uruguay, where he issued a partial dissenting opinion.

== Professional and academic activities ==
Born has taught courses on international arbitration, international litigation or public international law at Harvard Law School, Stanford Law School, University of Pennsylvania, University of Miami School of Law, St. Gallen University, National University of Singapore, Prince Sultan University (Riyadh), University of Peking, Tsinghua University, Georgetown University Law Center, University of Virginia School of Law and elsewhere. Born was named the inaugural Kwa Geok Choo Distinguished Visitor in 2012 at the National University of Singapore's Law School, and has been invited to deliver the James E.C. Brierley Memorial Lecture at McGill University, the Goff Arbitration Lecture at the City University of Hong Kong and the Freshfield International Arbitration Lecture. He has also been awarded honorary titles by leading universities, including St. Gallen (Professor) and Wayne State University (Doctor of Laws). Born received the Haverford College Alumni Distinguished Achievement Award in 2013, the 2018 James Wilson Award by the University of Pennsylvania Law Alumni Society and the Outstanding Contribution to the Legal Profession award by Chambers & Partners in 2018.

Born is a member of the American Law Institute (ALI) and has served on the Executive Council of the American Society of International Law, and as co-chair of the American Bar Association (ABA) International Section, Committee on International Aspects of Litigation. He also is a member of the Advisory Committee for the ALI's Restatement of International Commercial Arbitration, the ALI's Restatement (Fourth) of Foreign Relations Law, the Board of Trustees of the British Institute of International and Comparative Law, the Academic Council of the Institute for Transnational Arbitration, the advisory board of the African International Legal Awareness, the International Advisory Board of the Hong Kong International Arbitration Centre, and the Indian Journal of Arbitration Law. Born is a member of the Court of the Singapore International Arbitration Centre and a vice-president of the American Society of International Law.

Born published spy thriller, The File, in 2023, and he is currently developing another titled, The Priest, about a former Mafia enforcer posted abroad after becoming a priest.

== Principal publications ==
=== Books ===
==== Nonfiction ====
- International Arbitration: Law and Practice (Kluwer 3d ed. 2022).
- International Arbitration: Cases and Materials (Aspen 3d ed. 2022).
- International Commercial Arbitration (Kluwer 3d ed. 2022)
- International Commercial Arbitration: Commentary and Materials (Kluwer 2d ed. 2001) (Kluwer 1st ed. 1996)
- International Arbitration and Forum Selection Agreements: Planning, Drafting and Enforcing (Kluwer 7th ed. 2021)
- International Civil Litigation in United States Courts (Aspen 7th ed. 2022)
- The Extraterritorial Application of National Laws (1987) (with D. Lange)

==== Fiction ====
- The File Addison & Highsmith Publishers (2023)

== See also ==
- List of law clerks for the ninth seat of the Supreme Court of the United States
