= Energy Charter Treaty =

Multilateral agreement for energy

- Abbreviation: ECT
- Formation: 1991
- Type: Intergovernmental organisation
- Headquarters: Brussels, Belgium
- Official language: English, Russian
- Deputy Secretary General: Atsuko Hirose
- Current chairmanship: Republic of Tajikistan
- Main organ: Energy Charter Conference
- Staff: approx. 10
- Website: https://www.energycharter.org

The Energy Charter Treaty (ECT) is an international agreement which establishes a multilateral framework for cross-border cooperation in the energy industry, principally the fossil fuel industry. The treaty covers all aspects of commercial energy activities including trade, transit, investments and energy efficiency. The treaty contains dispute resolution procedures both for States Parties to the Treaty (vis-à-vis other States) and as between States and the investors of other States, who have made investments in the territory of the former. Full versions of the treaty, both consolidated and official, are readily accessible.

Initially, the Energy Charter process aimed to integrate the energy sectors of the Soviet Union and Eastern Europe at the end of the Cold War into the broader European and world markets. Its role, however, extends beyond east–west cooperation and, through legally binding instruments, free trade in global energy markets and non-discrimination to stimulate foreign direct investments and global cross-border trade.

Awards and settlements of the international arbitrations put forward by breaking the law of the Energy Charter Treaty are sometimes in the hundreds of millions of dollars. In 2014, the Yukos cases were decided in favour of the claimants on the basis of the treaty with a record-breaking US$50 billion award, although appeals continue in courts in the Netherlands.

The Energy Charter Treaty has been criticized for being a significant obstacle to enacting national policies to combat climate change, and for actively disincentivizing national governments from compliance with recent international climate treaties such as the Paris Agreement due to the threat of significant financial loss.

As of 2023, numerous countries have either left or have announced plans to leave the ECT. The European Union and Euratom took the final and formal step of exiting the Energy Charter Treaty, which will take effect one year after the depository has received the notification.

== History ==
=== European Energy Charter ===
The beginnings of the Energy Charter date back to a political initiative launched in Europe in the early 1990s. The end of the Cold War offered an unprecedented opportunity to overcome previous economic divisions between the nations on both sides of the Iron Curtain. The brightest prospect for mutually co-dependent beneficial cooperation was the energy sector, given Europe's growing energy demand and vast resource availability in post-Soviet nations. Additionally, there was a recognised need to establish a commonly accepted foundation for energy cooperation among the states of Eurasia. By these considerations, the Energy Charter process was born.

The original European Energy Charter declaration was signed in The Hague on 17 December 1991. It was a political declaration of principles for international energy cooperation in trade, transit and investment, together with the intention to negotiate a legally binding treaty, setting the beginning of the development of the Energy Charter Treaty.

=== Energy Charter Treaty ===
The treaty is a legally binding multilateral agreement covering investment promotion and protection, trade, transit, energy efficiency and dispute resolution. The treaty was signed in Lisbon in December 1994, together with a "protocol on energy efficiency and related environmental aspects" (PEEREA). The treaty and the protocol came into effect in April 1998. An amendment to the trade-related provisions reflecting the change from the General Agreement on Tariffs and Trade to World Trade Organization processes was also agreed at that time.

=== International Energy Charter ===
The International Energy Charter is a non-binding political declaration underpinning key principles for international energy cooperation. The declaration attempts to reflect the changes in the energy world that have emerged since the development of the original Energy Charter Treaty in the early 1990s. The International Energy Charter was signed on 20 May 2015, by 72 countries plus the EU, Euratom and ECOWAS at a Ministerial conference hosted by the government of The Netherlands.

== Energy Charter Conference ==
Article 33 of the treaty establishes the Energy Charter Conference, which is the governing and decision-making body of the Organisation and has United Nations General Assembly observer status in resolution 62/75 adopted by the General Assembly on 6 December 2007. Members consist of Countries and Regional Economic Integration Organisations that have signed or acceded to the treaty and are represented in the Conference and its subsidiary bodies. The Conference meets regularly to discuss issues affecting energy cooperation among Members and to review the implementation of the treaty and PEEREA provisions, and to consider new activities within the Energy Charter framework. The Energy Charter Conference has the following subsidiary bodies:

- Strategy and Implementation Group
- Budget Committee
- Legal Advisory Committee

Additionally, a consultative board—the Industry Advisory Panel—presents the private sector's views on relevant issues related to energy investments, cross-border flows and energy efficiency to the Conference and its groups.

== Scope ==
The treaty's provisions focus on four broad areas: Energy Trade, Investment, Energy Efficiency, Dispute Settlement, Energy Transit.

=== Trade ===
The Energy Charter Treaty's purpose in Energy Trade is to create open and non-discriminatory energy markets throughout its member states. This framework follows the rules of the multilateral trading system as embodied in the General Agreement on Tariffs and Trade (GATT), which later became the World Trade Organization (WTO). The Energy Charter Treaty extends the GATT and later the WTO rules in the energy sector amongst its members. Additionally, the treaty covers the trade of all energy materials (e.g. crude oil, natural gas, wood fuel, etc.), all final energy products (e.g. petroleum, electricity, etc.) and energy-related equipment. The rules of trade only cover trade in goods, not trade in services, nor does it concern itself with intellectual property rights.

=== Investment ===
The treaty is responsible for the protection of foreign direct investment. It is estimated that just in the European Union, the United Kingdom and Switzerland, the treaty protects fossil investments of at least €344.6 billion. Its provisions protect investors and their investments from political risks involved in investing in a foreign country such as discrimination, expropriation, nationalisation, breach of contract, damages due to war, etc. The legally binding nature of the Energy Charter Treaty makes it the world's only multilateral framework for matters specifically related to energy.

=== Dispute settlement ===
Whereas Article 27 sets out the provisions for dispute resolution between two contracting states, Article 26 of the Energy Charter Treaty provides express provisions for resolving disputes arising under the treaty between an investor of a Contracting State and another Contracting State. This process is generally known as Investor State Dispute Settlement or ISDS. The choices of arbitration rules are:

- ICSID Rules
- ICSID Additional Facilities Rules
- UNCITRAL Ad hoc Rules
- The Arbitration Rules of the Stockholm Chamber of Commerce

The most significant claims against Russia, pertaining to the Yukos decision, arose under the provisions of Article 26.

The drafting of the treaty has raised some difficult questions in the area of Investor-State Disputes by academics. In 2021 the treaty was struck down by the European Court of Justice for intra-EU disputes only. Some areas of discussion are:

- the standards of protection granted by the treaty;
- the international responsibility of States for breaches of the treaty;
- the various procedures available for the vindication of rights under the treaty;
- the conditions to be satisfied before a claimant's complaint may be considered on the merits;
- the impact of EU law on claims under the treaty;
- the treaty's provisions concerning taxation;
- possible effects of the ECT on climate;
- possible geopolitical, climate and financial impacts

and also:

- allegedly deleterious effects on states' budgets.
- Nathalie Bernasconi-Osterwalder, a lawyer at the International Institute for Sustainable Development (IISD), criticises the ECT for not having "more precise definitions of investment protection standards, [for not] set[ting] out responsibilities for investors and [for not] integrat[ing] innovations with respect to dispute settlement to ensure transparency and independence," unlike more modern approaches. Moreover, she claims it is following expansionist ambitions.
- Tania Voon, a Professor in Law at the University of Melbourne, criticises the modernization of the ECT for not including a removal of the art. 47 survival clause, and for failing to introduce "a distinction between investments based on fossil fuels and those based on renewable energy" in order to achieve climate goals.
- Cross-party members of the European Parliament advised the commission to withdraw if modernization is not adequate.

=== Energy efficiency ===
The Energy Charter's involvement in matters of energy efficiency and its relation to a cleaner environment was introduced in the 1991 European Energy Charter. The subsequent Energy Charter Treaty, and in particular Article 19 of the treaty, requires that each Contracting Party "... shall strive to minimise in an economically efficient manner, harmful Environmental Impacts arising from energy use."

Building on Article 19 of the Energy Charter Treaty, the Protocol on Energy Efficiency and Related Environmental Aspects (PEEREA) defines in more detail the policy principles that can promote energy efficiency and provides guidance on the development of energy efficiency programmes. PEEREA was negotiated, opened for signature and entered into force at the same time (16 April 1998) as the Energy Charter Treaty.

In contrast to other activities in the Charter process, the emphasis in the work on energy efficiency is not legally binding, but rather on practical implementation of a political commitment to improve energy efficiency. This is promoted through policy discussions based on analysis and exchange of experience between the member countries, invited independent experts and other international organisations.

The implementation of PEEREA provides its member countries with a range of best practices and a forum in which to share experiences and policy advice on energy efficiency issues. Within this forum, particular attention is paid to national energy efficiency strategy, taxation, pricing policy in the energy sector, environmentally related subsidies and other mechanisms for financing energy efficiency objectives.

=== Energy transit ===
The Energy Charter Treaty provides a set of rules that covers the entire energy chain, including not only investments in production and generation but also the terms under which energy can be traded and transported across various national jurisdictions to international markets. As such, the agreement is intended to prevent disruption of fuel passing between countries.

==== Transit Protocol ====
The Energy Charter Transit Protocol is a draft protocol which negotiations are not finalised yet. The Protocol would amplify and strengthen the treaty provisions on energy transit issues to mitigate some specific operational risks that continue to affect energy transit flows. Negotiations on the text of the Transit Protocol began in early 2000 and a compromise text reflecting an extended discussion between the European Union and Russia was tabled for adoption at the meeting of the Energy Charter Conference on 10 December 2003. It became clear during the meeting that a unanimous decision could not be reached on the basis of the compromise text; a complicating factor was that energy issues, including transit, were a subject on the bilateral agenda for the European Union and Russia in the context of Russian negotiations for accession to the World Trade Organization. The Protocol negotiations were then temporarily suspended.

In December 2007, the Energy Charter Conference reaffirmed its support for the finalisation of negotiations and adoption of the Energy Charter Protocol on Transit to expand the existing provisions of the treaty. This work proceeded until October 2011, when the European Union argued that, given current developments in the international energy situation and the lack of progress in negotiations and consultations, it appeared no longer opportune to continue talks. A review of the issue at the end of 2015 noted the continued demand for a multilateral legally-binding framework for energy transit, and recommended further exploring the basis for negotiations of such an agreement, which could address various aspects of oil, gas and electricity transportation and transit.

The Energy Charter Treaty includes an obligation of member countries to facilitate energy transit across their territory, in line with the principle of freedom of transit, and to secure established transit flows. At the same time, the treaty provisions do not oblige any country to introduce mandatory third-party access.

=== The principle of national sovereignty ===
The principles of the Energy Charter are based on the idea that international flows of investments and technologies in the energy sector are mutually beneficial. But at the same time, national sovereignty over energy resources is a core principle of the treaty (ECT Article 18). An objective of the treaty is to promote transparency and efficiency in the operation of energy markets, but it is for governments to define the structure of their domestic energy sector. Each country is free to decide whether and how its national energy resources are developed, and the extent to which its energy sector is open to foreign investors. The treaty does not deal with the ownership issues of the energy companies–there is no obligation to privatise state-owned energy companies, or to break up vertically integrated energy companies.

== Membership ==
Members are countries and Regional Economic Integration Organisations are party to the treaty through ratification or accession. Membership also includes signatories, which provisionally apply the treaty pending entry into force. Such provisional application applies automatically after signature, unless it is inconsistent with the domestic law of the country concerned. As October 2022, the treaty has 51 parties, while it is provisionally applied by two countries. All Members have ratified the treaty except for Australia, Belarus, Norway, and the Russian Federation. Belarus has accepted provisional application of the treaty.

=== Members of the Energy Charter Conference ===
- Afghanistan
- Albania
- Armenia
- Austria
- Azerbaijan
- Belarus * (suspended on 24 June 2022)
- Belgium
- Bosnia and Herzegovina
- Bulgaria (withdrawal effective on 26 August 2027)
- Croatia
- Cyprus
- Czech Republic
- Estonia
- Finland
- Georgia
- Greece
- Hungary
- Iceland (withdrawal effective on 17 March 2027)
- Ireland (withdrawal effective on 28 April 2027)
- Japan
- Jordan
- Kazakhstan
- Kyrgyzstan
- Latvia
- Liechtenstein
- Malta
- Moldova (withdrawal effective on 30 September 2027)
- Mongolia
- Montenegro
- North Macedonia
- Norway *
- Romania (withdrawal effective on 23 May 2027)
- Slovakia
- Sweden (withdrawal effective on 7 October 2027)
- Switzerland
- Tajikistan
- Turkey
- Turkmenistan
- Ukraine
- Uzbekistan
- Yemen

Russia and Australia provisionally applied the treaty, but indicated the end of the provisional application period in 2009 and 2021 respectively. Italy was a party to the treaty from 1998 until 2016. In October 2022, a minister from the Netherlands announced his intention to facilitate withdrawal from the treaty. On 21 October 2022, French President Emmanuel Macron also announced France's withdrawal from the treaty. One month later, the German government also expressed its intent to leave the accord. See also announced withdrawals below.

Note: * denotes a state that has signed the treaty and is applying it provisionally but has not ratified it, and denotes a state that has announced that it will withdraw from the treaty.

=== Observers ===
Observers status is granted to countries and Regional Economic Integration Organisations that have signed either the European Energy Charter or the International Energy Charter. Observers have the right to attend all Charter meetings and to receive all related documentation, reports and analysis, and to participate in the working debates taking place within the Energy Charter. Also, International Organisations can be granted Observer status by decision of the Energy Charter Conference. The intention is that Observer status should provide the chance for a country to familiarise itself with the Charter and its functions, to facilitate its assessment of the benefits of accession to the Energy Charter Treaty.

==== Countries ====
Signatories of European Energy Charter (1991)

- Australia
- Burundi
- Canada
- Chad
- Indonesia
- Italy
- Mauritania
- Morocco
- Niger
- Pakistan
- Palestine
- Serbia
- Syria
- Uganda
- United States

Signatories of the International Energy Charter (2015)

- Bangladesh
- Benin
- Burkina Faso
- Cambodia
- Chile
- China
- Colombia
- East African Community
- ECCAS
- ECOWAS
- Eswatini
- G5 Sahel
- Gambia
- Guatemala
- Guyana
- Iran
- Iraq
- Kenya
- Mali
- Nigeria
- Panama
- Rwanda
- Senegal
- Sierra Leone
- South Korea
- Tanzania
- United Arab Emirates
- Vietnam

==== International organisations ====
- Association of Southeast Asian Nations (ASEAN, 2003)
- Baltic Sea Region Energy Cooperation (BASREC, 2000)
- Black Sea Economic Cooperation (BSEC, 1991)
- CIS Electric Power Council (1991)
- European Bank for Reconstruction and Development (EBRD, 1991)
- International Energy Agency (IEA, 1991)
- International Energy Forum (IEF, 2007)
- Organisation for Economic Co-operation and Development (OECD, 1991)
- United Nations Economic Commission for Europe (UNECE, 1991)
- World Bank (1991)
- World Trade Organization (WTO, 1991)

=== Former members ===
- Italy (signed 1991, withdrew 2016)
- France (signed 1991, withdrew 2023)
- Germany (signed 1991, withdrew 2023)
- Poland (signed 1991, withdrew 2023)
- Luxembourg (signed 1991, withdrew 17 July 2024)
- Slovenia (withdrew 14 October 2024)
- Portugal (withdrew 2 February 2025)
- Spain (withdrew 17 April 2025)
- United Kingdom (withdrew 27 April 2025)
- European Union and Euratom (withdrew 28 June 2025)
- Netherlands (withdrew 28 June 2025)
- Denmark (withdrew 4 September 2025)
- Lithuania (signed 1995, withdrew 8 August 2026)

=== Russian participation ===
The Russian Federation signed the treaty and applied it provisionally but did not ratify it. It linked the ratification of the treaty to negotiations on an Energy Charter Transit Protocol. In October 2006, German chancellor Angela Merkel and French president Jacques Chirac proposed the creation of a balanced energy partnership between France and Germany, representing the European Union, and Russia. Under the agreement, Russia would have to sign the European Energy Charter, which, according to a New York Times summary of a report in Russian newspaper Kommersant, Russian President Vladimir Putin said impinges on Russia's national interests.

In December 2006, Russia indicated that the ratification of the treaty was unlikely due to the provisions requiring third-party access to Russia's pipelines. On 20 August 2009, it officially informed the depository of the treaty (Government of Portugal) that it did not intend to become a contracting party to the treaty and the related protocol terminating the provisional application of the treaty and the PEEREA starting from 18 October 2009.

Notwithstanding the termination of provisional application of the treaty by Russia, the provisions regarding dispute settlements and investment protection are still in force for additional twenty years. On 30 November 2009, the Permanent Court of Arbitration in The Hague, which had been considering this case since 2005 under the UNCITRAL Rules, ruled that former Yukos shareholders can move on to the merits phase of their arbitration claim against the Russian government. GML, previously known as Menatep, the principal shareholder in Yukos, is suing Russia for more than $100 billion in an international arbitration case under the treaty. The hearings took place in October 2012.

In July 2014, the international arbitration panel in The Hague unanimously ruled in favour of the shareholders, awarding $50 billion damages for the seizure of assets and dismantling of Yukos. The Russian government has vowed not to comply with the ruling, setting off an international legal dispute which has resulted in France and Belgium seizing Russian assets for possible use as restitution for the claimants. However, a French court ruled against the seizure by the French authorities, and a Dutch court later overturned the $50 billion ruling, arguing Russia had not ratified the Energy Charter Treaty and so was not bound by it.

== Case law ==
=== Renewable energy investment cases in Spain ===
As of 2020, Spain was the state most affected by ECT awards, having lost €825 million to investors. In a series of 20 arbitral decision, Spain was found liable for having generated legitimate expectations of a stable framework of renewable energy investment incentives and having afterwards abruptly reversed these expectations.

== Secretariat ==
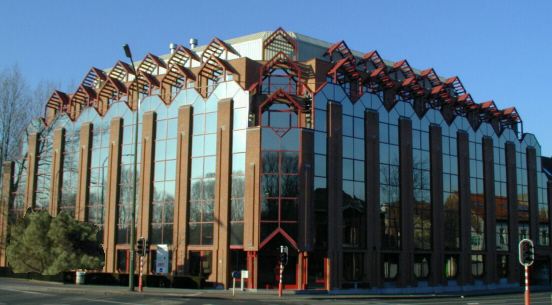
The Secretariat is located in Brussels.

The Energy Charter Treaty mandates the establishment of a Secretariat that was originally set up to accommodate the dialogue amongst the contracting parties during the negotiation of the treaty. The Secretariat is mandated by the Energy Charter Conference primarily to provide the Conference with all necessary assistance for the performance of its duties, including promotion, organisation and legal support, along with meeting space for subsidiary body meetings hosted at the Secretariat.

=== Organisation ===
One of the primary mandates given by the Energy Charter Conference to the Secretariat is to organise and administer meetings of the Conference and its subsidiary bodies. In addition, the Secretariat organises conferences and energy forums related to the global ongoing energy dialogues.

=== Monitor ECT and PEEREA obligations ===
Article 19 of the treaty, requires that each Contracting Party minimise, in an economically efficient manner, harmful environmental impacts arising from energy use. The Secretariat monitors the enforcement of these obligations in the contracting parties of the treaty and creates various publicly available reports on each of the contracting parties such as energy efficiency and the investment climate.

=== Legal support ===
The Energy Charter Treaty contains a comprehensive system for settling disputes on matters covered by the treaty. The two primary forms of binding dispute settlement are state-state arbitration on the interpretation or application of almost all aspects of the treaty (except for competition and environmental issues), and investor-state arbitration (Article 26) for investment disputes. There are special provisions, based on the WTO model, for the resolution of inter-state trade issues and the treaty also offers a conciliation procedure for transit disputes. The Secretariat maintains legal advice to these arbitrations as well as has responsibility for maintaining the Travaux préparatoires used to clarify the intentions of the treaty by Article 32 of the Vienna Convention on the Law of Treaties.

The Secretariat maintains a publicly available list of cases that have been brought by investors to international arbitration. These cases have been litigated under the arbitration regulations of the ICSID, Arbitration Institute of the SCC, and UNCITRAL. The Arbitration Awards or Settlements are sometimes in the hundred of millions of dollars. Disputes concerning competition (Article 6) and environmental issues (Article 19) the Secretariat provides for bilateral (in the case of competition) or multilateral (in the case of environmental protection) non-binding consultation mechanisms.

== Criticism ==
The Energy Charter Treaty has been criticised by some for being an obstacle to the transition to renewable energy. Such claims are contested. Transnational corporations who have invested in fossil fuel production and nuclear power can sue national governments for loss of profit on their investments as a consequence of the transition to renewable energy. Critics argue that the Energy Charter Treaty has a chilling effect on energy-related legislation. Russia and Norway refused to ratify the treaty, and Italy left in 2016, over environmental concerns about ECT. For example, the German energy company RWE has sued the Dutch government for €1.4 billion in compensation for the phasing out of coal power plants. In October 2020, the European Parliament voted to end fossil fuel protection under the ECT.

In late‑2022, the European Commission was seeking to clarify that the ECT does not apply within the European Union. The Commission says "the risk of legal conflict is such as to render an international agreement incompatible with EU law" and adds that EU [member] states should thus "confirm that the ECT does not apply, and has never applied to intra‑EU relations".

A joint investigation by The Guardian, the Transnational Institute, and Berlin‑based Powershift, made public in mid‑November 2022, revealed opaque proceedings, inadequate controls on conflicts of interest for key personnel, including arbitrators, and potential bias in favor of fossil fuel interests.

== Calls and plans for withdrawal ==
Several countries and organisations have proposed withdrawing from the ECT. However, the Treaty has a "sunset clause" that allows lawsuits to be filed for 20 years after the departure of a member; Italy left the ECT in 2015, but was successfully sued in 2022.

In 2020, Julia Steinberger and Yamina Saheb (both co-authors of the IPCC Sixth Assessment Report) initiated an open letter that calls for the withdrawal from the ECT. They justify the call with the claim that the ECT is an obstacle to the Paris Agreement and the European Green Deal. The letter has been signed, for example, by Sandrine Dixson-Declève, Connie Hedegaard, James K. Galbraith, Helga Kromp-Kolb, Rachel Kyte, Thomas Piketty, Olivier de Schutter and Jean-Pascal van Ypersele. On 15 December 2020, the Spanish minister for ecological transition, Teresa Ribera, supported the idea of withdrawing from it if it was not possible to reach an agreement to make the Energy Charter Treaty compatible with the Paris Agreement. The International Institute for Sustainable Development describes the possibility of a withdrawal with neutralization of the survival clause.

=== Announced withdrawals ===
As of October 2022, Spain, the Netherlands and Poland intended to withdraw from the ECT, and Germany, France and Belgium were "examining their options". On 21 October 2022, France announced that it would leave the treaty, citing a desire to accelerate nuclear and renewable energy use before fossil fuels. And on 14 November 2022, Germany announced its intention to withdraw in order to better tackle climate change. Slovenia had earlier stated its intention to withdraw. Denmark announced in April 2023 that it intends to withdraw.

In July 2023, the European Commission formally proposed legislation for both the union and its member states to make a "coordinated and orderly" simultaneous withdrawal from the ECT.

The UK government announced in September 2023 that it would consider leaving the "outdated" treaty if modernisation was not agreed by that November. In February 2024, the United Kingdom announced its plans to withdraw from the treaty due to a failure in negotiations to modernise the treaty.

=== Withdrawals ===
Italy withdrew in 2016; France, Germany and Poland in 2023; Luxembourg and Slovenia in 2024 and Denmark, the Netherlands, Portugal, Spain, the United Kingdom and the European Union/Euratom in 2025.

In March 2024, the EU Council agreed to withdraw the EU and Euratom from the ECT. After receiving the consent of the European Parliament, a formal notice of withdrawal was given on 27 June 2024. The EU and 26 member states also adopted an inter se declaration on the legal consequences of the European Court of Justice judgement in Komstroy (2021) which ruled that intra-EU ECT arbitration proceedings are unlawful under EU law.

In January 2026, the European Commission launched infringement proceedings against 16 EU member states for not withdrawing from the ECT. In the Commission's view, the matter falls within EU's exclusive competence and thus member states cannot be parties to the ECT, unless they are empowered by the EU to do so.

In February 2026, the EU and its member states, apart from Hungary, signed an Agreement on the interpretation and application of the Energy Charter Treaty which removes the possibility for arbitration proceedings under the ECT between the signatory EU member states, including during the ECT's 20-year sunset clause period. The agreement reaffirms the legal position taken in the June 2024 declaration. The agreement entered into force on 25 June 2026.

Overview withdrawels European Energy Treaty (ECT)
| Country | Notification date | Exit date | Current status |
|---|---|---|---|
| Italy | 2014, December 31 | 2016, January 1 | Fully Left |
| France | 2022, December 7 | 2023, December 8 | Fully Left |
| Germany | 2022, December 19 | 2023, December 20 | Fully Left |
| Poland | 2022, December 28 | 2023, December 29, | Fully Left |
| Luxembourg | 2023, June 16 | 2024, June 17 | Fully Left |
| Spain | 2024, April 16 | 2025, April 17 | Fully Left |
| Slovenia | 2023, October 13 | 2024, October 14 | Fully Left |
| European Union & Euratom | 2024, June 27 | 2025, June 28 | Fully Left |
| Netherlands | 2024, June 27 | 2025, June 28 | Fully Left |
| Lithuania | 2024, August 7 | 2025, August 7 | Fully Left |
| United Kingdom | 2024, April 26 | 2025, April 27 | Fully Left |
| Denmark | 2024, September 3 | 2025, September 4 | Fully Left |
| Portugal | 2024, Februari 1 | 2025, February 2 | Fully Left |
| Iceland | 2026, March 16 | 2027, March 16 | Pending Exit |
| Ireland | 2026, April 27 | 2027, April 27 | Pending Exit |
| Romania | 2026, May 22 | 2027, May 22 | Pending Exit |
| Bulgaria | 2026, August 25 | 2026, August 25 | Pending Exit |
| Moldova | 2026, September 29 | 2027, September 29 | Pending Exit |
| Sweden | 2026, October 6 | 2027, October 6 | Pending Exit |

== See also ==
- Energy law
- Russia in the European energy sector
- Energy policy of the European Union
- Energy policy of Russia
- Energy Community
- INOGATE
