= Siegfried H. Elsing =

German business lawyer

Siegfried H. Elsing (born 1950 in Essen, West Germany) is a German business lawyer. He is senior partner Germany of the international law firm Orrick, Herrington & Sutcliffe LLP and honorary professor at the Heinrich Heine University in Düsseldorf.

== Career ==
Siegfried H. Elsing studied law at the universities of Freiburg, Lausanne and Münster. Following that he worked as a research assistant at the Institute for Labor and Business Law at the Westphalian Wilhelms-University in Münster. In 1976, he gained a doctorate of laws (Dr. iur.) for his thesis on the subject “Extended Liability of Limited Partners and Atypical Limited Partnership” under the supervision of Prof. Dr. Hans Brox, the former Judge at the Federal Constitutional Court of Germany. In 1979 he acquired the academic degree of Master of Laws (LL.M.) at Yale Law School

Siegfried H. Elsing was admitted as an attorney in Germany in 1979 and in New York in 1983. The main focus of his work lies in the fields of arbitration, M&A transactions, investments, energy law, corporate law, financing, joint ventures and German-US legal relations. Siegfried H. Elsing has served as counsel, chairman, sole arbitrator and party-appointed arbitrator in more than 150 national and international arbitral proceedings (inter alia ICC, DIS, ICSID, SCC, VIAC, UNCITRAL, ad hoc). In addition, he appears as legal expert on US law matters before German courts and as legal expert on German law matters before US and UK courts. He also advises members of advisory and supervisory boards.

Siegfried H. Elsing founded the German law firm Hölters & Elsing in 1989 and initiated the firm’s merger with the US law firm Orrick, Herrington & Sutcliffe LLP in 2009.

In 2011, the President of the World Bank appointed him as a member of the ICSID Panel of Conciliators as recommended conciliator in international disputes.

Since 1999 he has been lecturing on international commercial arbitration and international civil procedure at the Heinrich-Heine University in Düsseldorf. In 2007, he was appointed Honorary Professor. He regularly lectures and appears as speaker at conferences in Germany and abroad and is author of numerous publications on arbitration and international business law.

He is chairman of the Supervisory Board of nobilia-Werke J. Stickling GmbH & Co. KG. On 15 May 2013, he took up office as Honorary Consul of the Grand Duchy of Luxembourg for the State of North Rhine-Westfalia.

== Memberships ==
Siegfried H. Elsing is a member of the supervisory board of the American Arbitration Association (AAA) and of the German Association of Arbitration (DIS). From 1990 to 1991 he was president of the Association Internationale des Jeunes Avocats (AIJA) and from 2007 to 2008 he chaired the mediation committee of the International Bar Association (IBA). He is also a member of various national and international associations (AAA, ABA, AIJA, ASA, Deutscher Anwaltverein e.V., DIS, IBA, ICCA, LCIA).

== Publications ==
- Die Kommanditgesellschaft, Heidelberger Musterverträge, 11. Auflage, Verlag Recht und Wirtschaft, Frankfurt am Main 2010 (with Nicholas Kessler)
- U.S.-amerikanisches Handels- und Wirtschaftsrecht, Schriftenreihe Recht der Internationalen Wirtschaft, 2. Auflage, Verlag Recht und Wirtschaft, Heidelberg 1999 (with Michael P. van Alstine)
- Erweiterte Kommanditistenhaftung und atypische Kommanditgesellschaft, Duncker & Humblot, Berlin 1977

== Honors ==
- "Best Lawyers 2013" - in the fields Corporate Law, M&A, Litigation, Arbitration and Mediation – Honored by the German business journal Handelsblatt.
- Legal 500 2013: Dispute Resolution.
- Chambers Global 2013: Arbitration (International): Most in Demand Arbitrators (Band 1), Europewide - Dispute Resolution: Most in Demand Arbitrators (Band 1), Germany - Dispute Resolution (Foreign Experts)(Spotlight Table), Germany - International Arbitration (Experts Based Abroad)(Spotlight Table), USA.
- Lawyer of the Year 2012 - in the fields Arbitration and Mediation; "Best Lawyers 2012" - Honored by the German business journal Handelsblatt.
