= Rome Convention on Damage Caused by Foreign Aircraft to Third Parties on the Surface =

1952 multilateral treaty

Rome Convention
Convention on Damage Caused by Foreign Aircraft to Third Parties on the Surface
- Signed: October 7, 1952 (opened for signature)
- Location: Rome
- Effective: February 4, 1958
- Expiration: Convention set no limits
- Signatories: 25
- Parties: 51
- Depositary: ICAO

The Convention on Damage Caused by Foreign Aircraft to Third Parties on the Surface, commonly called the Rome Convention, is an international treaty, concluded in Rome on October 7, 1952. It entered into force on February 4, 1958, and as of 2018 has been ratified by 51 states. Canada, Australia, and Nigeria were previous state parties but have denounced (withdrawn from) the treaty.

The treaty was established to ensure that individuals who suffer damage on the ground from foreign aircraft are entitled to compensation even if they had no connection to the flight itself.

- Strict Liability: The operator of the aircraft is held liable for damage caused on the surface, regardless of fault, as long as the aircraft was in flight and the damage was a direct result of the incident.
- Definition of “In Flight”: For heavier-than-air craft, this spans from the moment power is applied for takeoff until the landing run ends. For lighter-than-air craft, it’s from detachment to reattachment to the surface.
- Operator Responsibility: The person using the aircraft at the time is considered the operator and is liable. If someone else retained control of navigation, they may also be held responsible.
- Compensation Limits: The Convention sets limits on liability to balance fair compensation with the need to not hinder international air transport development.
