= Swiss Chamber of Commerce and Industry in Singapore =

SwissCham Singapore
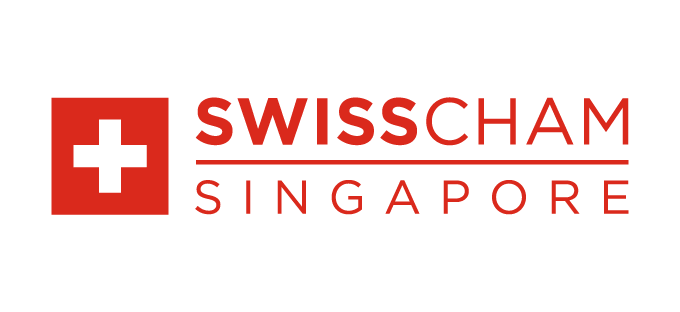
- Named after: Swiss Chamber of Commerce and Industry in Singapore
- Founded: 1988
- Founded at: Singapore
- Type: Chamber of Commerce
- Headquarters: 1 Swiss Club Link, Singapore 298162
- Region served: Singapore and Switzerland
- Chairman: Julie Raneda
- Website: www.swisscham.sg

Swiss Chamber of Commerce and Industry in Singapore (SwissCham), formerly known as Swiss Business Association, is a non-profit organization advocating Swiss business in Singapore.

== History ==
Being already present in Singapore for soon 200 years, Swiss companies intensified their activities and strengthened their presence in Singapore soon after it became a sovereign nation in 1965 and Switzerland decided to establish diplomatic relationships with the city-state in 1967. Swiss investments have been among the top five foreign direct investments (FDI) ever since, demonstrated by already more than 100 Swiss companies having had a presence in Singapore by the end of the 1980s. The need for an official forum to help these companies exchanging ideas and accessing information became increasingly important. In 1988, with the help of the Swiss Ambassador Kurt O. Wyss, the SBA was founded by a group of visionary Swiss-Singaporean businessmen and entrepreneurs. After representing and serving its members for over 25 years, the SBA committee conducted in 2015 a strategic review of its activities, vision and mission. With a transformation roadmap and revised statutes approved by the annual general meeting in 2016, the SBA got rebranded to the Swiss Chamber of Commerce and Industry in Singapore in 2017, underlining its continuous efforts to raise awareness on its work as a chamber of commerce and industry and staying relevant in a fast and constantly changing world. This sharpened focus of its activities included a variety of new initiatives such as a professionalized online presence and digital communication concept throughout 2016 as well as in 2017 the launch of the inaugural Swiss Business Award honoring “Excellence in People & Skills Development”.

== Members ==
While its founding members had mostly a link to the financial industry, the member base of the SwissCham grew to over 200 corporate members by 2018, from start-up companies and well established SMEs to large multinationals, representing all major industries of Swiss business in Singapore.

== Chairmen ==
1. Hans-Rudolf Schaub (1988)
2. Peter Schlumpf (1989-1991)
3. Marco Fleischmann (1992-1996)
4. Alex Widmer (1997)
5. Rolf Gerber (1998-2002)
6. Manfred Rist (2003-2005)
7. Pius Eberhard (2006-2008)
8. Christian Pauli (2008-2014)
9. Peter Huber (2014-2015)
10. Dr. Tom Ludescher (2015 - 2019)
11. Georg von Wattenwyl (2019–2023)
12. Julie Raneda (2023-Present)
