= United Nations Commission on International Trade Law =

Trade law body of the UN

- Abbreviation: UNCITRAL
- Formation: 1966; 60 years ago
- Type: Subsidiary body of the United Nations General Assembly
- Legal status: Active
- Headquarters: Vienna, Austria
- Head: Director; Anna Joubin-Bret; France
- Parent organization: UN General Assembly
- Website: uncitral.un.org

The United Nations Commission on International Trade Law (UNCITRAL) is a subsidiary body of the United Nations General Assembly responsible for helping to facilitate international trade and investment.

Established by the United Nations General Assembly in 1966, UNCITRAL's official mandate is "to promote the progressive harmonization and unification of international trade law" through conventions, model laws, and other instruments that address key areas of commerce, from dispute resolution to the procurement and sale of goods.

UNCITRAL carries out its work at annual sessions held alternately in New York City and Vienna, where it is headquartered.

== History ==
When world trade began to expand dramatically in the 1960s, national governments began to realize the need for a global set of standards and rules to harmonize national and regional regulations, which until then governed international trade.

The opening session of UNCITRAL was on January 29, 1968.

== Membership ==
UNCITRAL's original membership comprised 29 states, and was expanded to 36 in 1973, and again to 60 in 2004. Member states of UNCITRAL represent different legal traditions and levels of economic development, as well as different geographic regions. States include 12 African states, 15 Asian states, 18 European states, 6 Latin American and Caribbean states, and 1 Oceanian state. The Commission member States are elected by the General Assembly. Membership is structured to be representative of the world's various geographic regions and its principal economic and legal systems. Members of the commission are elected for terms of six years, the terms of half the members expiring every three years. As of 3 July 2017, the United Nations Commission on International Trade Law will be composed of the following member States:

=== Africa ===
- Algeria (2016)
- Burundi (2022)
- Ivory Coast (2019)
- Kenya (2022)
- Lesotho (2022)
- Liberia (2019)
- Mauritania (2019)
- Mauritius (2022)
- Namibia (2019)
- Nigeria (2022)
- Sierra Leone (2022)
- Somalia (2017)
- Uganda (2022)
- Tanzania (2062)
- Zambia (2019)

=== Asia ===
- China (2019)
- India (2022)
- Indonesia (2019)
- Iran (2022)
- Israel (2022)
- Japan (2019)
- Kuwait (2019)
- Lebanon (2022)
- Malaysia (2019)
- Pakistan (2022)
- Philippines (2022)
- Singapore (2019)
- South Korea (2019)
- Sri Lanka (2022)
- Thailand (2022)

=== Europe ===
- Armenia (2019)
- Austria (2022)
- Belarus (2022)
- Bulgaria (2019)
- Czech Republic (2022)
- Denmark (2019)
- France (2013)
- Germany (2013)
- Greece (2013)
- Hungary (2019)
- Italy (2016)
- Lithuania (2019)
- Poland (2012)
- Romania (2016)
- Russia (2013)
- Spain (2016)
- Switzerland (2019)
- United Kingdom (2019)
- Turkey (2022)

=== North America ===
- Canada (2019)
- Dominican Republic (2025)
- Honduras (2019)
- Mexico (2019)
- United States (2022)

=== Oceania ===
- Australia (2022)

=== South America ===
- Argentina (2016)
- Brazil (2022)
- Chile (2022)
- Colombia (2022)
- Ecuador (2022)
- Peru (2025)
- Venezuela (2022)

== Activities ==
The methods of work are organized at three levels. The first level is UNCITRAL itself (the Commission), which holds an annual plenary session held in alternate years in New York City and Vienna. The 2021 session was held in Vienna, the 2022 session was held in New York. The second level involves the intergovernmental working groups which develop the topics on UNCITRAL's work program. Texts designed to simplify trade transactions and reduce associated costs are developed by working groups comprising all member States of UNCITRAL, which meet once or twice per year. Non-member States and interested international and regional organizations are also invited and can actively contribute to the work since decisions are taken by consensus, not by vote. Draft texts completed by these working groups are submitted to UNCITRAL for finalization and adoption at its annual session. The International Trade Law Division of the United Nations Office of Legal Affairs provides substantive secretariat services to UNCITRAL, such as conducting research and preparing studies and drafts. This is the third level, which assists the other two in the preparation and conduct of their work.

UNCITRAL is

- Coordinating the work of active organizations and encouraging cooperation among them.
- Promoting wider participation in existing international conventions and wider acceptance of existing models and uniform laws.
- Preparing or promoting the adoption of new international conventions, model laws and uniform laws and promoting the codification and wider acceptance of international trade terms, provisions, customs and practice, in collaboration, where appropriate, with the organizations operating in this field.
- Promoting ways and means of ensuring a uniform interpretation and application of international conventions and uniform laws in the field of the law of international trade.
- Collecting and disseminating information on national legislation and modern legal developments, including case law, in the field of the law of international trade.
- Establishing and maintaining a close collaboration with the UN Conference on Trade and Development.
- Maintaining liaison with other UN organs and specialized agencies concerned with international trade.

== Working Groups ==
UNCITRAL has six working groups whose work focuses on different topics: Working Group I: Warehouse Receipts, Working Group II: Dispute Settlement, Working Group III: Reform of investor-state dispute settlement, Working Group IV: Electronic Commerce, Working Group V: Insolvency Law, Working Group VI: Negotiable Cargo Documents.

Working Group III: Reform of investor-state dispute settlement (ISDS) was constituted in 2017 and has been meeting since then twice or three times a year in Vienna and New York. The working group is of particular significance to states with international investment agreements and its work consists in helping states negotiate the reform of ISDS.

== Conventions ==
A convention is an agreement among participating states establishing obligations binding upon those States that ratify or accede to it. A convention is designed to unify law by establishing binding legal obligations. To become a party to a convention, States are required formally to deposit a binding instrument of ratification or accession with the depository. The entry into force of a convention is usually dependent upon the deposit of a minimum number of instruments of ratification.

UNCITRAL conventions:

- the Convention on the Recognition and Enforcement of Foreign Arbitral Awards (the New York Convention) (1958)
- the Convention on the Limitation Period in the International Sale of Goods (1974)
- the United Nations Convention on the Carriage of Goods by Sea (1978)
- the United Nations Convention on Contracts for the International Sale of Goods (1980)
- the United Nations Convention on International Bills of Exchange and International Promissory Notes (1988)
- the United Nations Convention on the Liability of Operators of Transport Terminals in International Trade (1991)
- the United Nations Convention on Independent Guarantees and Stand-by Letters of Credit (1995)
- the United Nations Convention on the Assignment of Receivables in International Trade (2001)
- the United Nations Convention on the Use of Electronic Communications in International Contracts (2005)
- the United Nations Convention on Contracts for the International Carriage of Goods Wholly or Partly by Sea (2008)
- the United Nations Convention on Transparency in Treaty-based Investor-State Arbitration (2015)
- the United Nations Convention on International Settlement Agreements Resulting from Mediation (the Singapore Convention on Mediation) (2018)
- the United Nations Convention on the International Effects of Judicial Sales of Ships (2022)

== Model laws ==
Model laws are legislative text that is recommended to States for enactment as part of their national laws. Model laws are generally finalized and adapted by UNCITRAL, at its annual session, while conventions require the convening of a diplomatic conference.

- UNCITRAL Model Law on International Commercial Arbitration (1985) (text)
- UNCITRAL Model Law on International Credit Transfers (1992)
- UNCITRAL Model Law on Procurement of Goods, Construction and Services (1994)
- UNCITRAL Model Law on Electronic Commerce (1996)
- UNCITRAL Model Law on Cross-Border Insolvency (1997)
- UNCITRAL Model Law on Electronic Signatures (2001)
- UNCITRAL Model Law on International Commercial Conciliation (2002) (text)
- Model Legislative Provisions on Privately Financed Infrastructure Projects (2003)
- UNCITRAL Model Law on Public Procurement (adopted 1 July 2011, replacing the 1994 Model Law on Procurement of Goods, Construction and Services)
- UNCITRAL Model Law on Secured Transactions (2016)
- UNCITRAL Model Law on Electronic Transferable Records (2017)
- UNCITRAL Model Law on the Recognition and Enforcement of Insolvency-Related Judgments (2018)
- UNCITRAL Model Law on Enterprise Group Insolvency (2019)
- UNCITRAL Model Legislative Provisions on Public-Private Partnerships (2020)
- UNCITRAL Model Law on the Use and Cross-border Recognition of Identity Management and Trust Services (2022)

UNCITRAL also drafted the:

- UNCITRAL Arbitration Rules (1976) (text)—revised rules will be effective August 15, 2010; pre-released, July 12, 2010
- UNCITRAL Conciliation Rules (1980)
- UNCITRAL Arbitration Rules (1982)
- UNCITRAL Notes on Organizing Arbitral Proceedings (1996)

== CLOUT (Case Law on UNCITRAL Texts) ==
The Case Law on UNCITRAL Texts system is a collection of court decisions and arbitral awards interpreting UNCITRAL texts.

CLOUT includes case abstracts in the six United Nations languages on the United Nations Convention on Contracts for the International Sale of Goods (CISG) (Vienna, 1980) and the UNCITRAL Model Law on International Commercial Arbitration (1985).

== Legislative Guides ==
A legislative guide aims to provide a detailed analysis of the legal issues in a specific area of the law, proposing efficient approaches for their resolution in the national or local context. Legislative guides do not contain articles or provisions, but rather recommendations. Legislative Guides are developed by the UNCITRAL Working Groups and subsequently finalized by the UNCITRAL Commission in its annual session.

UNCITRAL has adopted the following legislative guides:

- UNCITRAL Legislative Guide on Privately Financed Infrastructure Projects (2000)
- UNCITRAL Legislative Guide on Insolvency Law (2004)
- UNCITRAL Legislative Guide on Secured Transactions (2007)
- UNCITRAL Legislative Guide on Secured Transactions: Supplement on Security Rights in Intellectual Property (2010)

== See also ==
- United Nations General Assembly Sixth Committee (Legal)
- United Nations Office of Legal Affairs
- UNIDROIT
