= Hong Kong International Arbitration Centre =

- 香港國際仲裁中心
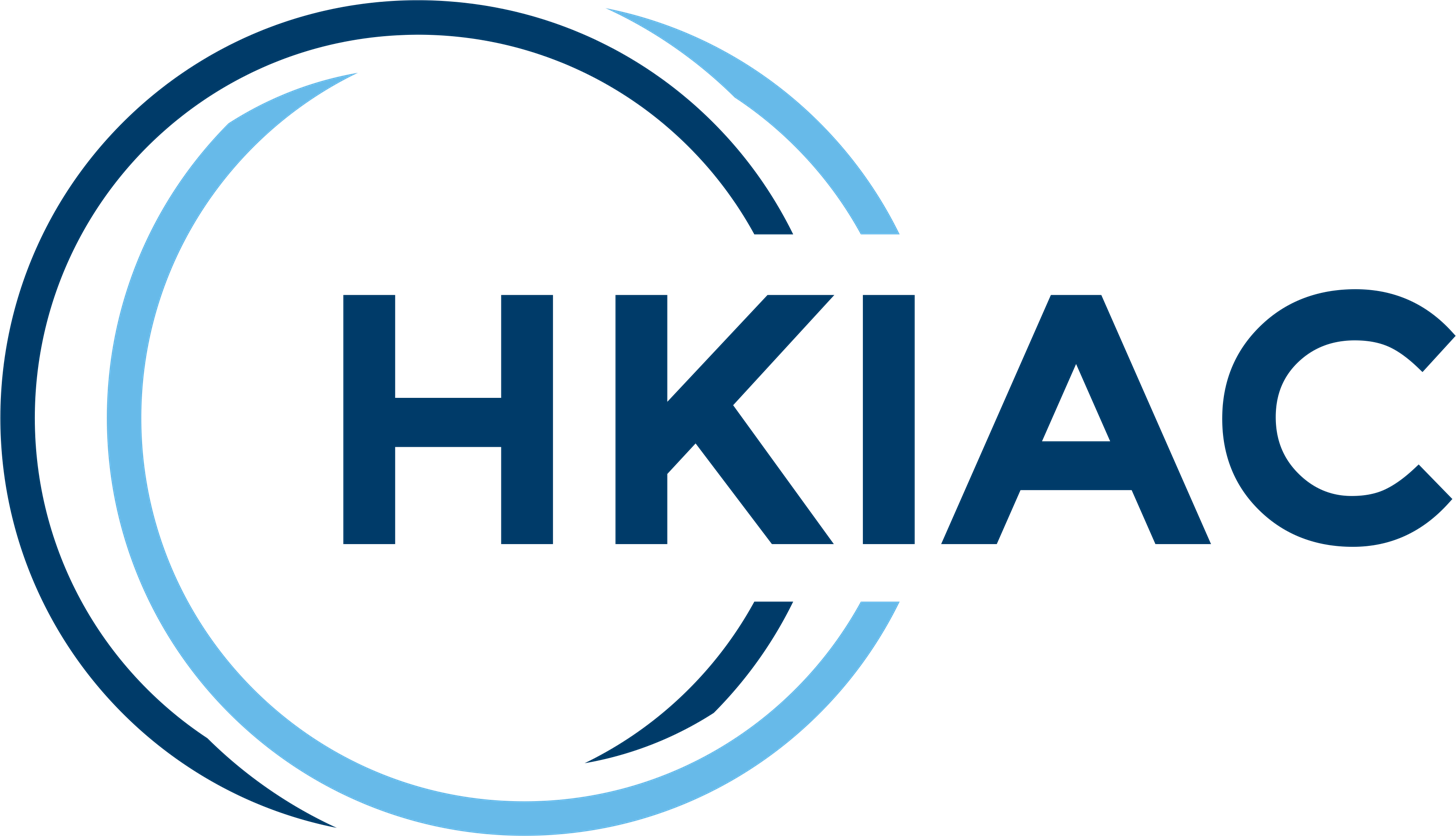
- Seal of HKIAC
- 22.283°N 114.158°E
- Established: 1985
- Location: 8 Connaught Place; Central, Hong Kong
- Coordinates: 22.283°N 114.158°E
- Website: hkiac.org

Secretary-General
- Currently: Joanne Lau
- Since: 2024

Chairpersons
- Currently: David W. RIVKIN and Rimsky YUEN GBM, SC, JP
- Since: 2020

Hong Kong International Arbitration Centre
- Traditional Chinese: 香港國際仲裁中心
Transcriptions
Yue: Cantonese
- Yale Romanization: Hēung góng gwok jai juhng chòih jūng sām
- Jyutping: Hoeng^{1} gong^{2} gwok^{3} zai^{3} zung^{6} coi^{4} zung^{1} sam^{1}

The Hong Kong International Arbitration Centre (HKIAC) is an institution based in Hong Kong, providing alternative dispute resolution services from administered and ad hoc international arbitration to mediation, adjudication and domain name dispute resolution. It was founded in 1985.

== History ==
The Centre was established in 1985 to promote the use of arbitration and other forms of alternative dispute resolution services in Asia. Formed as a non-profit making company limited by guarantee under Hong Kong law, HKIAC was originally funded with assistance from the business community and the Hong Kong Government. Today, the Centre is independent of both the business community and the Government, and operates with its own budget and funds. It operates under a Council composed of businesses and professionals of several nationalities. Administration of arbitration is conducted by the Secretariat through the Centre's Secretary-General. HKIAC also has an International Advisory Board to provide guidance and advice to HKIAC on a policy level.

== Case Management ==
HKIAC maintains one of the largest caseloads in the Asia-Pacific region, having handled over 9,000 cases since 1985. In 2016, HKIAC received a total of 460 new cases, out of which 262 were arbitrations, 183 were domain name disputes and 15 were mediations. Within the 262 arbitration cases, 94 were fully administered by HKIAC, featuring parties from 39 jurisdictions. 87.2% of new administered arbitrations were international cases.
