= United Nations Convention on Transparency in Treaty-based Investor-State Arbitration =

The United Nations Convention on Transparency in Treaty-based Investor-State Arbitration (also known as the Mauritius Convention on Transparency) is a multilateral treaty that was concluded in 2014 and entered into force in 2017. As of September 2025, it has been ratified by 9 states: Australia, Belgium, Bolivia, Cameroon, Canada, Gambia, Iraq, Mauritius, and Switzerland.

The treaty was adopted on 10 December 2014 by United Nations General Assembly resolution 69/116 during the sixty-ninth session of the General Assembly. It has been signed by 25 states. It entered into force on 18 October 2017 after it had been ratified by its third state.
