= Convention on the Limitation Period in the International Sale of Goods =

1974 United Nations treaty

Limitation Convention
Convention on the Limitation Period in the International Sale of Goods
- Signed: 14 June 1974
- Location: New York, US
- Effective: 1 August 1988
- Condition: 10 ratifications or accessions
- Signatories: 12
- Parties: 30
- Depositary: Secretary-General of the United Nations
- Languages: 6 (Arabic, Chinese, English, French, Russian, Spanish)

The Convention on the Limitation Period in the International Sale of Goods (the "Limitation Convention") is a uniform law treaty prepared by the United Nations Commission on International Trade Law (UNCITRAL). It deals with the prescription of actions relating to contracts for the international sale of goods due to the passage of time.

The Limitation Convention was originally prepared as a chapter of a broader treaty on contracts for international sale of goods. Adopted in 1974, it was amended in 1980 to be fully aligned, especially with respect to scope of application, to the United Nations Convention on Contracts for the International Sale of Goods (CISG), adopted in the same year.

== Adoption ==
As of 2 January 2016, the following 30 states have ratified, acceded to, succeeded to, or participate under the Limitation Convention:

- Argentina
- Belarus
- Belgium
- Benin
- Bosnia and Herzegovina
- Burundi
- (Ivory Coast) Cote D'Ivoire
- Cuba
- Czech Republic
- Dominican Republic
- Egypt
- Ghana
- Guinea
- Hungary
- Liberia
- Mexico
- Moldova
- Montenegro
- Norway
- Paraguay
- Poland
- Romania
- Serbia
- Slovakia
- Slovenia
- Uganda
- Ukraine
- United States of America
- Uruguay
- Zambia

The Limitation Convention has been signed, but not yet ratified, acceded to, succeeded to, or participated under, by Brazil, Bulgaria, Costa Rica, Mongolia, Nicaragua, and the Russian Federation.

== Substantive provisions ==
What follows is a very summary description of the content of the Limitation Convention, provided for preliminary information only. Readers are encouraged to refer to the explanatory note to that convention prepared by the UNCITRAL secretariat for further introductory information on the Limitation Convention.

In its original unamended version, the Limitation Convention applies when both parties have their place of business in contracting States (Article 3(1)). In the amended version, the Limitation Convention applies also when rules of private international law make the law of a Contracting State applicable to the contract of sale (Article 3(1)(b)). Hence, the Limitation Convention, as amended, applies in the same case as the CISG. The reference is to the rules of private international law applicable to the contract itself, and not to limitation matters.

Likewise, other matters relating to scope of application of the Convention, especially in its amended form, are treated similarly as in the CISG. However, article 5 of the Limitation Convention contains an additional list of excluded matters that is not present in the CISG. The limitation period is four years, starting from the date when the claim accrues (Articles 8 and 9). The limitation period stops to run when judicial or arbitral proceedings are commenced (Articles 13 and 14).

If the debtor recognizes in writing its debt before the end of the limitation period, a new limitation period runs (Article 20). The limitation period is also extended in case of force majeure (Article 21). In any case, the limitation period expires in ten years from the date on which it commenced (Article 23).

The effect of the expiration of the limitation period is that no related claim may be recognized or enforced; however, that claim may be used as a counter-claim to set off, under certain conditions (Article 25).

The expiration of the limitation period may be taken into account only if invoked by the parties to the proceedings (Article 24); however, a State may lodge a reservation to Article 24 and therefore allow for the judge to declare the expiration of the limitation period ex officio (Article 36).

== Practical relevance ==
The Limitation Convention has often been considered as a lesser, and less lucky sister of the CISG. However, it is applied regularly in certain regions of the world, especially Eastern Europe. The Case Law on UNCITRAL Texts database has an increasing collection of decisions relating to the Limitation Convention.

While the USA has been a party to the Limitation Convention for more than two decades, only one recent judicial precedent deals with the Convention. This is unusual given that, for instance, the Limitation Convention applies to all contracts for sale of goods concluded between parties with place of business in the USA and in Mexico, unless opted out of, and may indicate limited awareness of its existence.

== See also ==
- United Nations Commission on International Trade Law
- United Nations Convention on Contracts for the International Sale of Goods
- United Nations Convention on the Use of Electronic Communications in International Contracts
- International commercial law
