= Comune =

Third-level administrative division of Italy

Municipalities of Italy Comuni (Italian)
- Category: Regionalised unitary state
- Location: Italy
- Number: 7,894
- Populations: 30 (Morterone) – 2,745,062 (Rome)
- Areas: 0.1124 km^{2} (0.0434 sq mi) (Atrani) – 1,286.7305 km^{2} (496.8094 sq mi) (Rome)
- Government: Comunal Government, Provincial Government, Regional Government, National Government
- Subdivisions: Frazioni, circoscrizioni and municipi

Administrative divisions of Italy: Regions (black borders) Provinces (dark gray borders) Comuni (light grey borders)

A comune (pronounced [koˈmuːne]; pl.: comuni, pronounced [koˈmuːni]) is an administrative division of Italy, roughly equivalent to a township or municipality. It is the third-level administrative division of Italy, after regions (regioni) and provinces (province). The comune can also have the title of città (lit. 'city').

Formed praeter legem according to the principles consolidated in medieval municipalities, the comune is provided for by article 114 of the Constitution of Italy. It can be divided into frazioni, which in turn may have limited power due to special elective assemblies.

In the autonomous region of the Aosta Valley, a comune is officially called a commune in French.

== Overview ==
The comune provides essential public services: registry of births and deaths, registry of deeds, and maintenance of local roads and public works. Many comuni have a Polizia Comunale (lit. 'Communal Police'), which is responsible for public order duties. The comune also deal with the definition and compliance with the piano regolatore generale (lit. 'general regulator plan'), a document that regulates the building activity within the communal area.

All communal structures or schools, sports and cultural structures such as communal libraries, theaters, etc. are managed by the comuni. Comuni must have their own communal statute and have a climatic and seismic classification of their territory for the purposes of hazard mitigation and civil protection. Comuni also deal with waste management.

It is headed by a mayor (sindaco or sindaca) assisted by a legislative body, the consiglio comunale (lit. 'communal council'), and an executive body, the giunta comunale (lit. 'communal committee'). The mayor and members of the consiglio comunale are elected together by resident citizens: the coalition of the elected mayor (who needs a relative majority or an absolute majority in the first or second round of voting, depending on the population) gains three-fifths of the consiglio's seats.

The giunta comunale is chaired by the mayor, who appoints other members, called assessori, one of whom serves as deputy mayor (vicesindaco). The offices of the comune are housed in a building usually called the municipio, or palazzo comunale (lit. 'town hall').

As of 2026, there were 7,894 comuni in Italy; they vary considerably in size and population. For example, the comune of Rome, in Lazio, has an area of 1,287.36 km^{2} (497.05 sq mi) and a population of 2,745,062 inhabitants, and is both the largest and the most populated.

Mural crown for the title of comune. It is located in the upper part of the coat of arms of the comune.

Atrani in the province of Salerno (Campania) is the smallest comune by area, with only 0.1206 km^{2} (0.0466 sq mi), and Morterone (Lombardy) is the smallest by population. Many present-day comuni trace their roots along timescales spanning centuries and at times millennia.

The northernmost comune is Predoi, the southernmost one Lampedusa e Linosa, the westernmost Bardonecchia and the easternmost Otranto. The comune with the longest name is San Valentino in Abruzzo Citeriore, while the comuni with the shortest name are Lu, Ro, Ne, Re and Vo'.

The average population of the comuni varies widely by province and region. The province of Barletta-Andria-Trani, for example, has 381,091 inhabitants in 10 comuni, or 37,593 inhabitants per comune; whereas the province of Isernia has 81,415 inhabitants in 52 comuni, or 1,504 inhabitants per comune—roughly 25 times more communal units per inhabitant.

The coats of arms of the comuni are assigned by decree of the Prime Minister of Italy by the Office of State Ceremonial and Honors, Honors and Heraldry Service (division of the Presidency of the Council born from the transformation of the Royal Consulta Araldica, eliminated pursuant to the provisions final of the Constitution of Italy).

== Subdivisions ==
Number of comuni and population in Italy
Year	Number	Population	Pop/Comune
1861	7,720	22,171,946	2,872
1871	8,383	27,295,509	3,256
1881	8,260	28,951,546	3,505
1901	8,263	32,963,316	3,989
1911	8,324	35,841,563	4,306
1921	9,195	39,396,757	4,285
1931	7,311	41,043,489	5,614
1936	7,339	42,398,489	5,777
1951	7,810	47,515,537	6,084
1961	8,035	50,623,569	6,300
1971	8,056	54,136,547	6,720
1981	8,086	56,556,911	6,994
1991	8,100	56,885,336	7,023
2001	8,101	56,995,744	7,036
2011	8,092	59,433,744	7,345
2021	7,904	59,236,213	7,494

Administrative subdivisions within comuni vary according to their population size.

Comuni with at least 250,000 residents are divided into circoscrizioni (roughly equivalent to French arrondissements or London boroughs) to which the comune delegates administrative functions such as the running of schools, social services and waste collection; the delegated functions vary from comune to comune. These bodies are headed by an elected president and a local council.

Smaller comuni usually comprise:

- A main city, town or village, that almost always gives its name to the comune; such a place is referred to as the capoluogo (lit. 'head-place' or 'capital'; cf. the French chef-lieu) of the comune; the word comune is also used in casual speech to refer to the city hall.
- Outlying areas often called frazioni (sing.: frazione, abbreviated: fraz.; lit. 'fraction'), each usually centred on a small town or village. These frazioni usually never had pasts as independent settlements, but occasionally are former smaller comuni consolidated into a larger one. They may also represent settlements which predate the capoluogo. The ancient town of Pollentia (today Pollenzo), for instance, is a frazione of Bra. In recent years the frazioni have become more important due to the institution of the consiglio di frazione (lit. 'fraction council'), a local form of government which can interact with the comune to address local needs, requests and claims. Even smaller places are called località (abbreviated: loc.; lit. 'localities').
- Smaller administrative divisions called municipi, which are similar to districts and neighbourhoods.

Sometimes a frazione might be more populated than the capoluogo; and rarely, owing to unusual circumstances (such as depopulation), the town hall and its administrative functions can be moved to one of the frazioni, but the comune still retains the name of the capoluogo.

In some cases, a comune might not have the same name as the capoluogo. In these cases, it is a comune sparso (lit. 'dispersed municipality') and the frazione which hosts the town hall (municipio) is a sede municipale (compare county seat).

=== Rione ===
Some towns refer to neighborhoods within a comune as a rione (Italian: [riˈoːne]; pl.: rioni) or a contrada (pl.: contrade). The term originated from the administrative divisions of Rome, and is derived from the Latin word regio (pl.: regiones), 'region'. All currently extant rioni are located in Municipio I of Rome. The term has been adopted as a synonym of quartiere in the Italian comuni. Terzieri, quartieri, sestieri, rioni, and their analogues are usually no longer administrative divisions of these towns, but historical and traditional communities, seen especially in the annual Palio of such towns.

==== Terziere ====
A terziere (pl.: terzieri) is a subdivision of several towns in Italy. The word derives from terzo (lit. 'third') and is thus used only for towns divided into three neighborhoods. Terzieri are most commonly found in Umbria, for example in Trevi, Spello, Narni and Città della Pieve; towns divided into terzieri in other regions include Lucca in Tuscany, and Ancona and Macerata in the Marches. The medieval Lordship of Negroponte, on the island of Euboea, was also divided into three distinct rulerships, which were known as terzieri.

==== Quartiere ====
A quartiere (Italian: [kwarˈtjɛːre]; pl.: quartieri) is a territorial subdivision, properly used, for towns divided into four neighborhoods (quarto; lit. 'fourth') by the two main roads. It has been later used as a synonym for neighbourhood, and an Italian town can be now subdivided into a larger number of quartieri. The Swiss town of Lugano (in the Italian-speaking canton of Ticino) is also subdivided into quarters.

==== Sestiere ====
The sestieri of Venice: Cannaregio Castello San Marco Dorsoduro San Polo Santa Croce

A sestiere (pl.: sestieri) is a subdivision of certain Italian towns and cities. The word is from sesto (lit. 'sixth'), so it is thus used only for towns divided into six districts. The best-known example is the sestieri of Venice, but Ascoli Piceno, Genoa, Milan and Rapallo, for example, were also divided into sestieri. The medieval Lordship of Negroponte, on the island of Euboea, was also at times divided into six districts, each with a separate ruler, through the arbitration of Venice, which were known as sestieri. The island of Crete, a Venetian colony (the Kingdom of Candia) from the Fourth Crusade, was also divided into six parts, named after the sestieri of Venice herself, while the capital Candia retained the status of a comune of Venice. The island of Burano, north of Venice is also subdivided into sestieri.

A variation of the word is occasionally found: the comune of Leonessa, for example, is divided into sesti or sixths.

== Homonymy ==
There are not many perfect homonymous comuni. There are only five cases in 10 comuni:

- Castro: Castro, Apulia and Castro, Lombardy
- Livo: Livo, Lombardy and Livo, Trentino
- Peglio: Peglio, Lombardy and Peglio, Marche
- Samone: Samone, Piedmont and Samone, Trentino
- San Teodoro: San Teodoro, Sardinia and San Teodoro, Sicily

This is mostly due to the fact the name of the province or region was appended to the name of the comune in order to avoid confusion. Two provincial capitals share the name Reggio: Reggio nell'Emilia, the capital of the province of Reggio Emilia, in the Emilia-Romagna region, and Reggio di Calabria, the capital of the homonymous metropolitan city, in the Calabria region. Many other towns or villages are likewise partial homonyms (e.g. Anzola dell'Emilia and Anzola d'Ossola, or Bagnara Calabra and Bagnara di Romagna).

== Title of city ==
Mural crown for the title of città (city)

The title of città (lit. 'city') in Italy is granted to comuni that have been awarded it by decree of the King of Italy (until 1946), of the provisional head of state (from 1946 to 1948) or, subsequently, of the President of the Republic (after 1948). This is done through a proposal through the Ministry of the Interior, to which the comune concerned sends an application for a concession, by virtue of their historical, artistic, civic or demographic importance.

The comuni endowed with the title of città usually carry the golden crown above their coat of arms, except with different provisions in the decree approving the coat of arms. "The crown of the city ([...]) is formed by a golden circle opened by eight city gates (five visible) with two cordoned walls on the margins, supporting eight towers (five visible) joined by curtain walls, all in gold and black walled."

== Statistics ==
=== Largest comuni by area ===
The following is a list of the largest comuni in Italy, in descending order of surface area, according to ISTAT data referring to 9 October 2011. The provincial capitals are highlighted in bold.

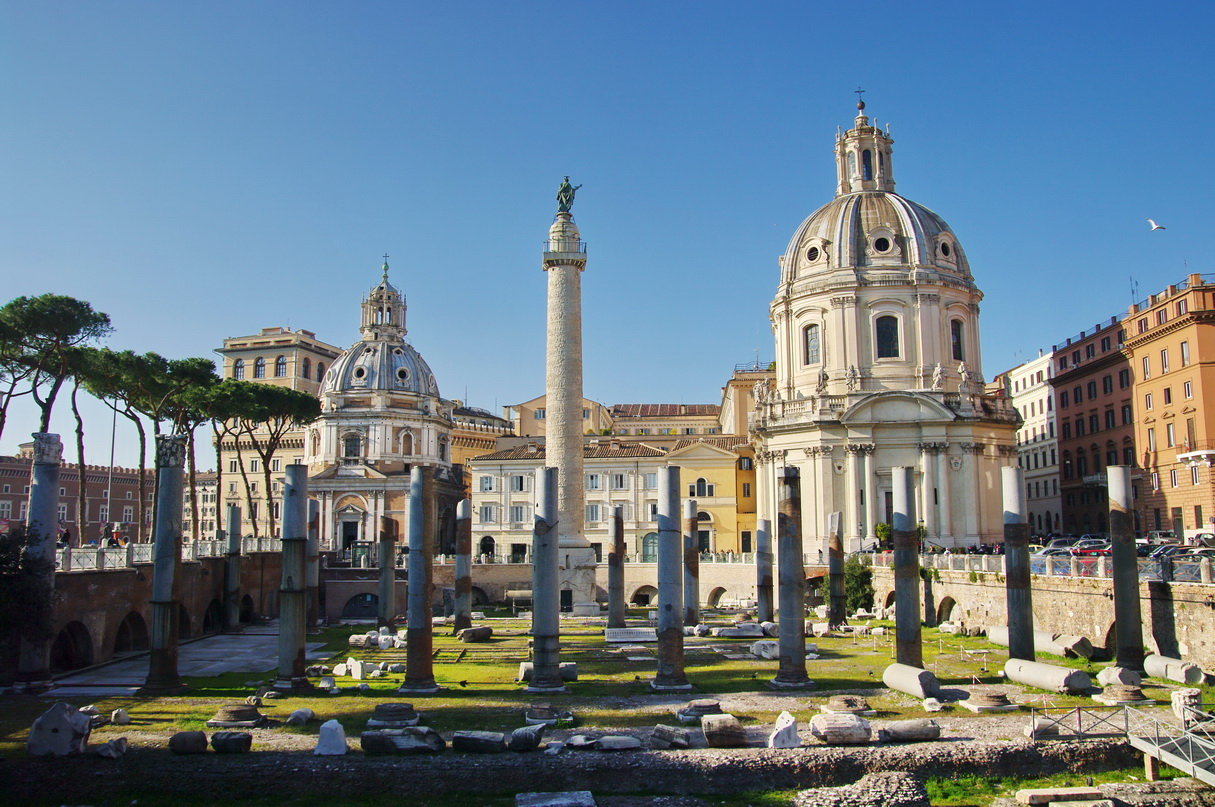
Rome

Rank	Comune	Region	Province	Area (km^{2})
1	**Rome**	Lazio	Rome	1,287.36 km^{2} (497.05 sq mi)
2	**Ravenna**	Emilia-Romagna	Ravenna	653.82 km^{2} (252.44 sq mi)
3	Cerignola	Apulia	Foggia	593.93 km^{2} (229.32 sq mi)
4	Noto	Sicily	Syracuse	554.99 km^{2} (214.28 sq mi)
5	**Sassari**	Sardinia	Sassari	547.04 km^{2} (211.21 sq mi)
6	Monreale	Sicily	Palermo	530.18 km^{2} (204.70 sq mi)
7	Gubbio	Umbria	Perugia	525.78 km^{2} (203.00 sq mi)
8	**Foggia**	Apulia	Foggia	509.26 km^{2} (196.63 sq mi)
9	**L'Aquila**	Abruzzo	L'Aquila	473.91 km^{2} (182.98 sq mi)
10	**Grosseto**	Tuscany	Grosseto	473.55 km^{2} (182.84 sq mi)
11	**Perugia**	Umbria	Perugia	449.51 km^{2} (173.56 sq mi)
12	**Ragusa**	Sicily	Ragusa	444.67 km^{2} (171.69 sq mi)
13	Altamura	Apulia	Bari	431.38 km^{2} (166.56 sq mi)
14	**Caltanissetta**	Sicily	Caltanissetta	421.25 km^{2} (162.65 sq mi)
15	**Venice**	Veneto	Venice	415.90 km^{2} (160.58 sq mi)
16	**Viterbo**	Lazio	Viterbo	406.23 km^{2} (156.85 sq mi)
17	**Ferrara**	Emilia-Romagna	Ferrara	405.16 km^{2} (156.43 sq mi)
18	**Andria**	Apulia	Barletta-Andria-Trani	402.89 km^{2} (155.56 sq mi)
19	**Matera**	Basilicata	Matera	392.09 km^{2} (151.39 sq mi)
20	Città di Castello	Umbria	Perugia	387.32 km^{2} (149.55 sq mi)
21	Gravina in Puglia	Apulia	Bari	384.74 km^{2} (148.55 sq mi)
22	**Arezzo**	Tuscany	Arezzo	384.70 km^{2} (148.53 sq mi)
23	Olbia	Sardinia	Sassari	383.64 km^{2} (148.12 sq mi)
24	Caltagirone	Sicily	Catania	383.38 km^{2} (148.02 sq mi)
25	Manciano	Tuscany	Grosseto	372.51 km^{2} (143.83 sq mi)
26	**Enna**	Sicily	Enna	358.75 km^{2} (138.51 sq mi)
27	Manfredonia	Apulia	Foggia	354.54 km^{2} (136.89 sq mi)
28	Spoleto	Umbria	Perugia	348.14 km^{2} (134.42 sq mi)
29	Corigliano-Rossano	Calabria	Cosenza	346.56 km^{2} (133.81 sq mi)
30	Cortona	Tuscany	Arezzo	342.97 km^{2} (132.42 sq mi)

=== Smallest comuni by area ===
The following is a list of the smallest comuni in Italy, in ascending order of surface area, according to ISTAT data referring to 9 October 2011.

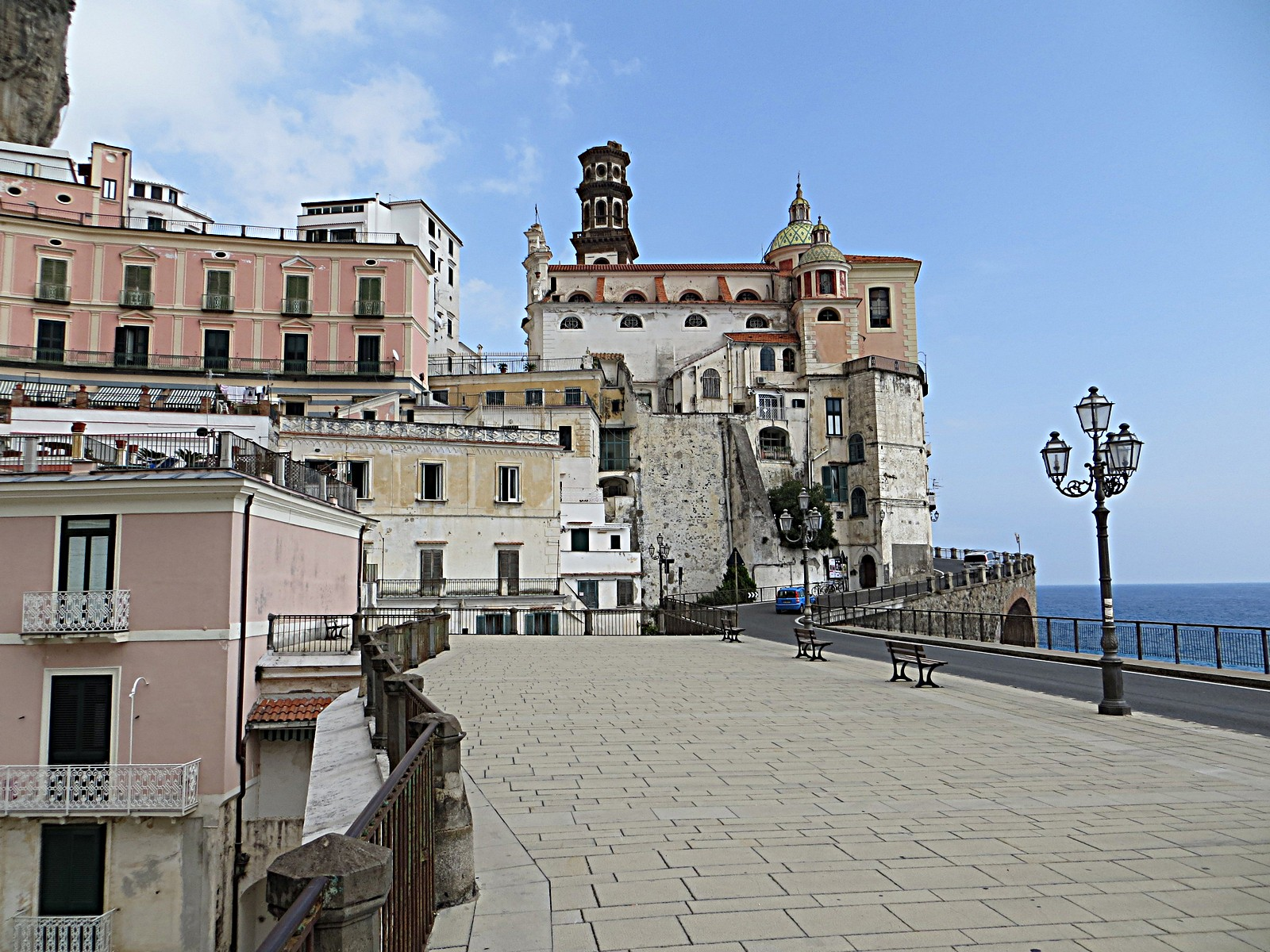
Atrani

Rank	Comune	Region	Province	Area (km^{2})
1	Atrani	Campania	Salerno	0.1206 km^{2} (0.0466 sq mi)
2	Miagliano	Piedmont	Biella	0.6678 km^{2} (0.2578 sq mi)
3	Fiorano al Serio	Lombardy	Bergamo	1.0601 km^{2} (0.4093 sq mi)
4	Conca dei Marini	Campania	Salerno	1.1281 km^{2} (0.4356 sq mi)
5	Roccafiorita	Sicily	Messina	1.1682 km^{2} (0.4510 sq mi)
6	Solza	Lombardy	Bergamo	1.2278 km^{2} (0.4741 sq mi)
7	Maslianico	Lombardy	Como	1.2885 km^{2} (0.4975 sq mi)
8	San Lorenzo al Mare	Liguria	Imperia	1.2886 km^{2} (0.4975 sq mi)
9	Crosio della Valle	Lombardy	Varese	1.4407 km^{2} (0.5563 sq mi)
10	Ferrera di Varese	Lombardy	Varese	1.5265 km^{2} (0.5894 sq mi)
11	Casavatore	Campania	Naples	1.5267 km^{2} (0.5895 sq mi)
12	Piario	Lombardy	Bergamo	1.5451 km^{2} (0.5966 sq mi)
14	Vajont	Friuli-Venezia Giulia	Pordenone	1.5860 km^{2} (0.6124 sq mi)
15	Arizzano	Piedmont	Verbano-Cusio-Ossola	1.5995 km^{2} (0.6176 sq mi)
16	Longone al Segrino	Lombardy	Como	1.6045 km^{2} (0.6195 sq mi)
17	Viganò	Lombardy	Lecco	1.6049 km^{2} (0.6197 sq mi)
18	Brunello	Lombardy	Varese	1.6200 km^{2} (0.6255 sq mi)
19	Camparada	Lombardy	Monza e Brianza	1.6337 km^{2} (0.6308 sq mi)
20	Caines	Trentino-Alto Adige	South Tyrol	1.6345 km^{2} (0.6311 sq mi)
21	Curti	Campania	Caserta	1.6894 km^{2} (0.6523 sq mi)
22	Castel Rozzone	Lombardy	Bergamo	1.7066 km^{2} (0.6589 sq mi)
23	Lozza	Lombardy	Varese	1.7100 km^{2} (0.6602 sq mi)
24	Aci Bonaccorsi	Sicily	Catania	1.7243 km^{2} (0.6658 sq mi)
25	Calvignasco	Lombardy	Milan	1.7272 km^{2} (0.6669 sq mi)
26	Ventotene	Lazio	Latina	1.7454 km^{2} (0.6739 sq mi)
27	Lirio	Lombardy	Pavia	1.7457 km^{2} (0.6740 sq mi)
28	Masciago Primo	Lombardy	Varese	1.8082 km^{2} (0.6981 sq mi)
29	Montello	Lombardy	Bergamo	1.8156 km^{2} (0.7010 sq mi)
30	Carzano	Trentino-Alto Adige	Trentino	1.8202 km^{2} (0.7028 sq mi)

=== Highest comuni by altitude ===
The following is a list of the first comuni by altitude, in descending order. The indicated altitude coincides with the height above sea level of the town hall.

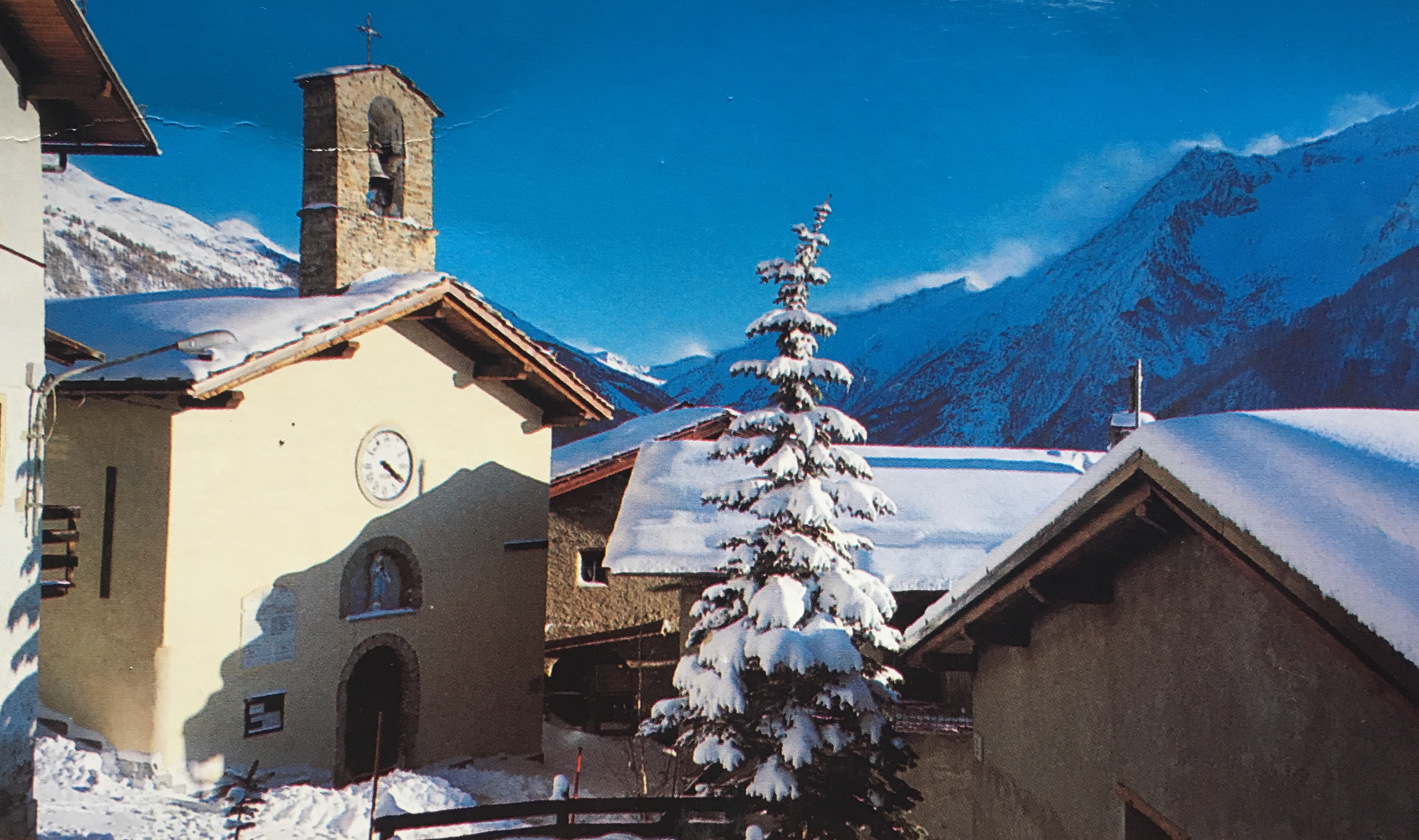
Sestriere

Rank	Comune	Region	Province	Altitude (meters above the sea level)
1	Sestriere	Piedmont	Turin	2,035 m (6,677 ft)
2	Chamois	Aosta Valley	—	1,818 m (5,965 ft)
3	Livigno	Lombardy	Sondrio	1,816 m (5,958 ft)
4	Claviere	Piedmont	Turin	1,760 m (5,770 ft)
5	Rhêmes-Notre-Dame	Aosta Valley	—	1,725 m (5,659 ft)
6	Ayas	Aosta Valley	—	1,699 m (5,574 ft)
7	Argentera	Piedmont	Cuneo	1,684 m (5,525 ft)
8	Valgrisenche	Aosta Valley	—	1,664 m (5,459 ft)
9	La Magdeleine	Aosta Valley	—	1,644 m (5,394 ft)
10	Elva	Piedmont	Cuneo	1,637 m (5,371 ft)
11	Gressoney-La-Trinité	Aosta Valley	—	1,635 m (5,364 ft)
12	Ceresole Reale	Piedmont	Turin	1,620 m (5,310 ft)
13	Pontechianale	Piedmont	Cuneo	1,614 m (5,295 ft)
14	Bionaz	Aosta Valley	—	1,606 m (5,269 ft)
15	Bellino	Piedmont	Cuneo	1,572 m (5,157 ft)
16	Corvara in Badia	Trentino-Alto Adige	South Tyrol	1,568 m (5,144 ft)
17	Selva di Val Gardena	Trentino-Alto Adige	South Tyrol	1,563 m (5,128 ft)
18	Sauze di Cesana	Piedmont	Turin	1,560 m (5,120 ft)
19	Cogne	Aosta Valley	—	1,544 m (5,066 ft)
20	Valsavarenche	Aosta Valley	—	1,541 m (5,056 ft)
21	Valtournenche	Aosta Valley	—	1,528 m (5,013 ft)
22	Pragelato	Piedmont	Turin	1,524 m (5,000 ft)
23	Curon Venosta	Trentino-Alto Adige	South Tyrol	1,520 m (4,990 ft)
24	Saint-Rhémy-en-Bosses	Aosta Valley	—	1,519 m (4,984 ft)
25	Sauze d'Oulx	Piedmont	Turin	1,509 m (4,951 ft)
26	Foppolo	Lombardy	Bergamo	1,508 m (4,948 ft)
27	Torgnon	Aosta Valley	—	1,489 m (4,885 ft)
28	Predoi	Trentino-Alto Adige	South Tyrol	1,475 m (4,839 ft)
29	Livinallongo del Col di Lana	Veneto	Belluno	1,475 m (4,839 ft)
30	Canazei	Trentino-Alto Adige	Trentino	1,465 m (4,806 ft)

=== Largest comuni by population ===
The following is a list of the first comuni by population in descending order, according to ISTAT as of 2026. The regional capitals are in bold.

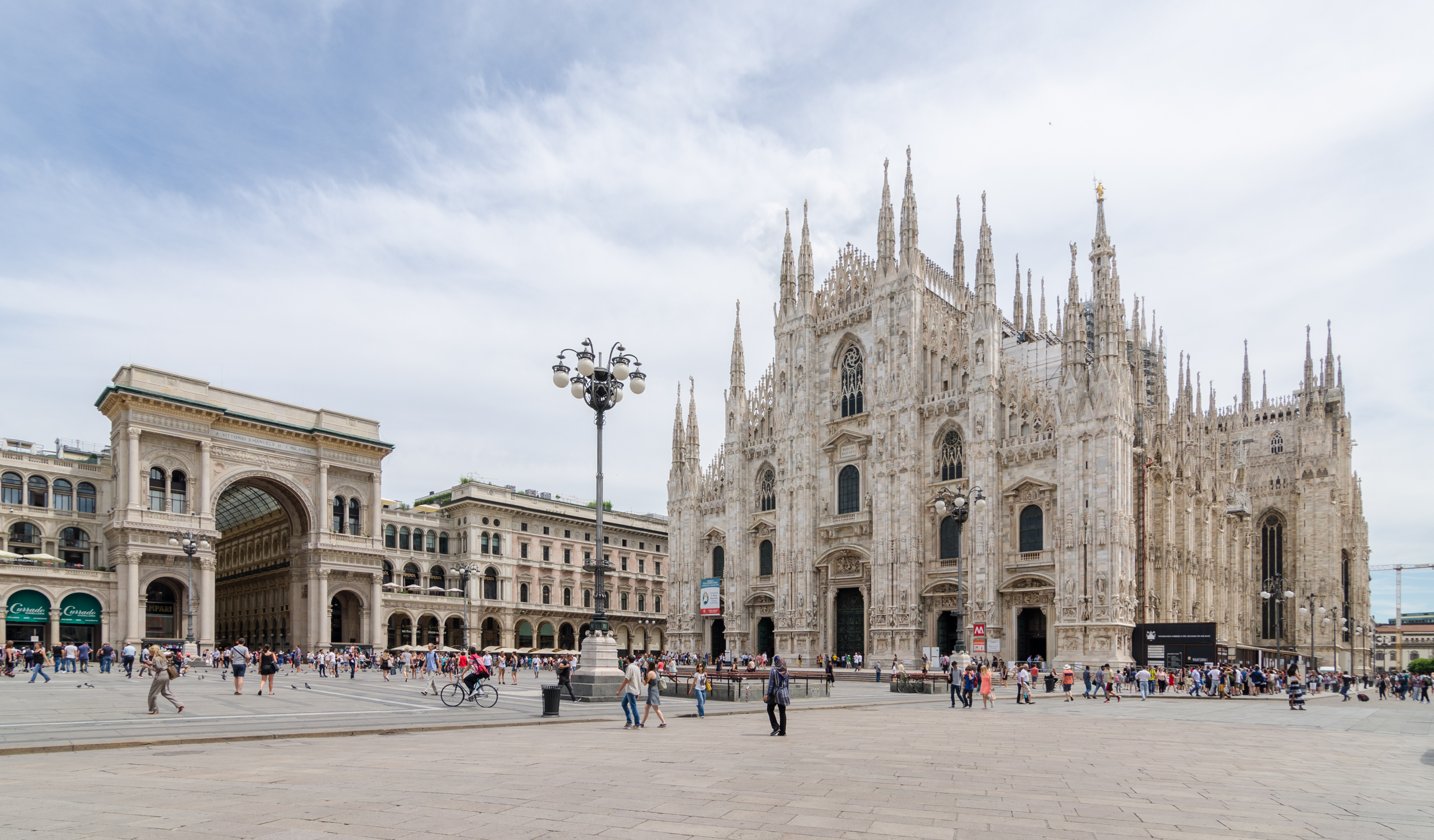
Milan

Rank	Comune	Region	Province	Inhabitants
1	**Rome**	Lazio	Rome	2,745,062
2	**Milan**	Lombardy	Milan	1,362,863
3	**Naples**	Campania	Naples	905,050
4	**Turin**	Piedmont	Turin	855,654
5	**Palermo**	Sicily	Palermo	626,273
6	**Genoa**	Liguria	Genoa	566,247
7	**Bologna**	Emilia-Romagna	Bologna	391,473
8	**Florence**	Tuscany	Florence	361,625
9	**Bari**	Apulia	Bari	316,248
10	Catania	Sicily	Catania	296,984
11	Verona	Veneto	Verona	255,139
12	**Venice**	Veneto	Venice	249,385
13	Messina	Sicily	Messina	216,458
14	Padua	Veneto	Padua	208,202
15	Brescia	Lombardy	Brescia	201,342
16	Parma	Emilia-Romagna	Parma	199,450
17	**Trieste**	Friuli-Venezia Giulia	Trieste	198,622
18	Prato	Tuscany	Prato	198,327
19	Taranto	Apulia	Taranto	185,112
20	Modena	Emilia-Romagna	Modena	184,361
21	Reggio Emilia	Emilia-Romagna	Reggio Emilia	172,921
20	Reggio Calabria	Calabria	Reggio Calabria	167,925
23	**Perugia**	Umbria	Perugia	162,384
24	Ravenna	Emilia-Romagna	Ravenna	156,475
25	Livorno	Tuscany	Livorno	152,451
26	Rimini	Emilia-Romagna	Rimini	150,774
27	**Cagliari**	Sardinia	Cagliari	145,981
28	Foggia	Apulia	Foggia	145,078
29	Ferrara	Emilia-Romagna	Ferrara	129,048
30	Latina	Lazio	Latina	127,450

=== Comuni by demographic ranges ===
The data is updated as of 1 January 2026.

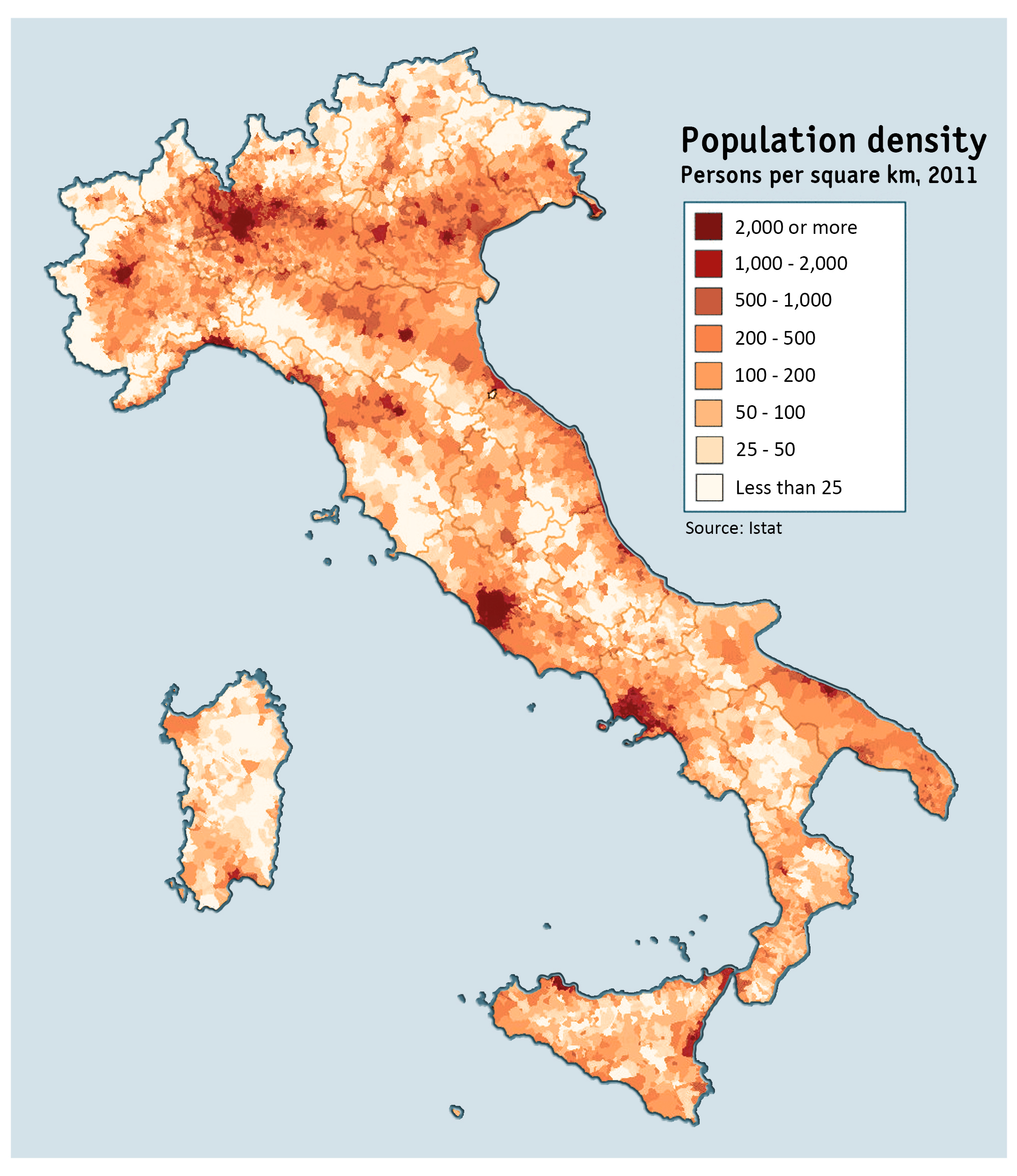
Map of Italy's population density at the 2011 census

Demographic range	Comuni		Population	
Demographic range	Number	%	Residents	%
more than 500,000 inhab.	6	0.08%	7,061,149	11.98%
from 250,000 to 499,999 inhab.	5	0.06%	1,621,469	2.75%
from 100,000 to 249,999 inhab.	33	0.42%	4,819,688	8.18%
from 60,000 to 99,999 inhab.	54	0.68%	4,156,999	7.05%
from 20,000 to 59,999 inhab.	411	5.21%	13,507,972	22.92%
from 10,000 to 19,999 inhab.	692	8.77%	9,579,510	16.25%
from 5,000 to 9,999 inhab.	1,173	14.86%	8,303,691	14.09%
from 3,000 to 4,999 inhab.	1,059	13.42%	4,368,752	7.41%
from 2,000 to 2,999 inhab.	914	11.58%	2,244,533	3.81%
from 1,000 to 1,999 inhab.	1,518	19.23%	2,199,135	3.73%
from 500 to 999 inhab.	1,114	14.11%	814,501	1.38%
less than 500 inhab.	915	11.59%	265,307	0.45%
Total	7,894	100.00%	58,942,706	100.00%

=== Demographic ranges by macroregion ===
The data is updated as of 1 January 2026.

Demographic range	Number of comuni			Resident population		
Demographic range	North	Centre	South	North	Centre	South
more than 500,000 inhab.	3	1	2	2,784,764	2,745,062	1,531,323
from 250,000 to 499,999 inhab.	2	1	2	646,612	361,625	613,232
from 100,000 to 249,999 inhab.	17	6	10	2,507,525	847,035	1,465,128
from 60,000 to 99,999 inhab.	17	14	23	1,351,698	1,106,314	1,698,987
from 20,000 to 59,999 inhab.	162	80	169	5,067,915	2,737,576	5,702,481
from 10,000 to 19,999 inhab.	352	115	225	4,818,520	1,645,170	3,115,820
from 5,000 to 9,999 inhab.	677	154	342	4,773,071	1,118,148	2,412,472
from 3,000 to 4,999 inhab.	617	127	315	2,641,564	498,849	1,228,339
from 2,000 to 2,999 inhab.	491	113	310	1,206,583	275,623	762,327
from 1,000 to 1,999 inhab.	793	179	546	1,152,479	261,283	785,373
from 500 to 999 inhab.	621	110	383	449,806	81,780	282,915
less than 500 inhab.	623	68	224	173,366	20,660	71,281
Total	4,375	968	2,551	27,573,903	11,699,125	19,669,678

== See also ==
- Regions of Italy
- Metropolitan cities of Italy
- Provinces of Italy
- List of municipalities of Italy
- List of renamed municipalities in Italy
- Alphabetical list of municipalities of Italy
- Fusion of municipalities of Italy
- Municipalities of Switzerland – those in Italian-speaking areas of the country are called comuni
- Circoscrizione
- Frazione
- Località
- Rioni of Rome

== Bibliography ==
- "Terzière". Enciclopedia Italiana di Scienze, Lettere e Arti (in Italian).
