= Free carrier =

The term free carrier has specific meanings in diverse fields, including:

- International commerce (see incoterms#Free Carrier)
- Semiconductor physics (see Free Carrier Concentration)
