= Lex petrolea =

Proposed body of customary law

Lex petrolea is a proposed sub branch of lex mercatoria that would be based on the body of international arbitral awards related to the petroleum industry. The first use of the term was in the landmark arbitration case Government of the State of Kuwait v. American Independent Oil Co. (AMINOIL) where the argument was made that the past disputes had "generated a customary rule valid for the oil industry - a lex petrolea that was in some sort a particular branch of a general universal lex mercatoria".
