= Lex mercatoria =

Part of the history of contract law

Lex mercatoria (from Latin for "merchant law"), often referred to as "the Law Merchant" in English, is the body of commercial law used by merchants throughout Europe during the medieval period. It evolved similar to English common law as a system of custom and best practice, which was enforced through a system of merchant courts along the main trade routes. It developed into an integrated body of law that was voluntarily produced, adjudicated and enforced on a voluntary basis, alleviating the friction stemming from the diverse backgrounds and local traditions of the participants. Due to the international background local state law was not always applicable and the merchant law provided a leveled framework to conduct transactions reducing the preliminary of a trusted second party. It emphasized contractual freedom and inalienability of property, while shunning legal technicalities and deciding cases ex aequo et bono. With lex mercatoria professional merchants revitalized the almost nonexistent commercial activities in Europe, which had plummeted after the fall of the Roman Empire.

In the last years new theories had changed the understanding of this medieval treatise considering it as proposal for legal reform or a document used for instructional purposes. These theories consider that the treatise cannot be described as a body of laws applicable in its time, but the desire of a legal scholar to improve and facilitate the litigation between merchants. The text is composed by 21 sections and an annex. The sections described procedural matters such as the presence of witnesses and the relation between this body of law and common law. It has been considered as a false statement to define this as a system exclusively based in custom, when there are structures and elements from the existent legal system, such as Ordinances and even concepts proper of the Romano-canonical procedure. Other scholars have characterized the law merchant as a myth and a seventeenth-century construct.

== Common law development ==
The law merchant is referenced as early as 13 Edw. 4 (1473/4): "'the king has jurisdiction over them [merchants] to put them to stand (estoyer) to right, etc., but this will be 'according to the laws of nature' (secundum legem naturae) which is called by some 'law merchant', which is universal law for everyone (tout le monde)."

English courts applied merchant customs only if they were "certain" in nature, "consistent with law" and "in existence since time immemorial". English judges also required that merchant customs be proven before the court. But even as early as 1608, Chief Justice Edward Coke described lex mercatoria as "a part of the common law", and William Blackstone would later concur. The tradition continued especially under Lord Mansfield, who is said to be the father of English commercial law. Precepts of the lex mercatoria were also kept alive through equity and the admiralty courts in maritime affairs. In the US, traditions of the lex mercatoria prevailed in the general principles and doctrines of commercial jurisprudence.

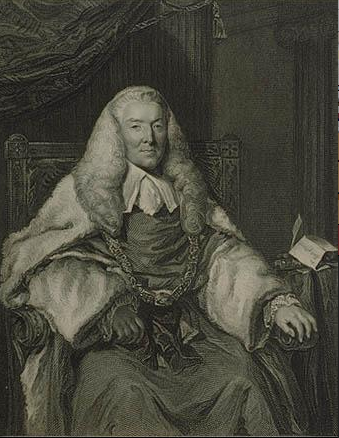
Lord Mansfield was a champion of fusing lex mercatoria with the common law.

Sir John Holt (Chief Justice 1689 to 1710) and Lord Mansfield (Chief Justice, 1756 to 1788) were the leading proponents of incorporating the lex mercatoria into the common law. Holt did not complete the task, possibly out of his own conservatism (see Clerke v Martin) and it was Lord Mansfield that became known as the 'founder of the commercial law of this country" (Great Britain). Whilst sitting in Guildhall, Lord Mansfield created,

a body of substantive commercial law, logical, just, modern in character and at the same time in harmony with the principles of the common law. It was due to Lord Mansfield's genius that the harmonisation of commercial custom and the common law was carried out with an almost complete understanding of the requirements of the commercial community, and the fundamental principles of the old law and that that marriage of idea proved acceptable to both merchants and lawyers.

- Statute of Merchants 1285 (11 Edw I and 13 Edw I) aka "Statute of Acton Burnell"

== International commercial law and arbitration ==
Lex mercatoria precepts have been reaffirmed in new international mercantile law. The new commercial law is grounded on commercial practice directed at market efficiency and privacy. Dispute resolution has also evolved, and functional methods like international commercial arbitration is now available. These developments have also attracted the interest of empirical sociology of law.

== Present and future commercial law ==
Lex mercatoria is sometimes used in international disputes between commercial entities. Most often those disputes are decided by arbitrators which sometimes are allowed (explicitly or implied) to apply lex mercatoria principles.

== See also ==
- International commercial terms
- Law of the sea
- UNIDROIT
- UNCITRAL
- Statute of the Staple (27 Edw III, stat 2, c 20)

== Bibliography ==
- JH Baker. "The Law Merchant and the Common Law", Cambridge Law Journal 38, no. 295 (1979).
- Mary Elizabeth Basile et al. Lex Mercatoria and Legal Pluralism: A Late Thirteenth Century Treatise and Its Afterlife. Cambridge, MA: Ames Foundation, 1998.
- Wyndham Beawes. Lex Mercatoria: Or, A Complete Code of Commercial Law, F. C. and J. (Rivington, 1813)
- Bruce L. Benson. "The Spontaneous Evolution of Commercial Law", Southern Economic Journal 55, no. 3 (1989): 644–661.
- Bruce L. Benson (2008). "Law Merchant". In Hamowy, Ronald (ed.). The Encyclopedia of Libertarianism. Thousand Oaks, CA: Sage; Cato Institute. pp. 286–287. doi:10.4135/9781412965811.n172. ISBN 978-1412965804.
- Lisa Bernstein & Francesco Parisi, eds. Customary law and economics. Cheltenham (UK)–Northampton, MA: Edward Elgar Publishing Limited, 2014.
- Daniel R. Coquillette. “Legal Ideology and Incorporation II: Sir Thomas Ridley, Charles Molloy, and the Literary Battle for the Law Merchant, 1607–1676”, Boston University Law Review 61 (1981): 315–371.
- C Gross & H Hall, eds., Selden Society, Select Cases on the Law Merchant (1908–32)
- WH Hamilton, 'The Ancient Maxim Caveat Emptor' (1931) 50 Yale Law Journal 133, who shows that caveat emptor never had any place in Roman law, or civil law, or lex mercatoria and was probably a mistake when implemented into the common law.
- G Malynes, Consuetudo vel lex mercatoria (London, 1622)
- Paul Milgrom, Douglass North, & Barry Weingast. “The Role of Institutions in the Revival of Trade: The Medieval Law Merchant”, Economics and Politics 2, no. 1 (1990): 1–23.
- W Mitchell, The Early History of the Law Merchant (Cambridge, 1904)
- Theodore Plucknett. A Concise History of the Common Law, 5th edn. Getzville, NY: William S. Hein & Company, 2001.
- JS Rogers, The Early History of the Law of Bills and Notes (1995) chapter 1
- John William Smith, Mercantile Law (ed. Hart and Simey, 1905).
- Leon E. Trakman. The Law Merchant: The Evolution of Commercial Law. Littleton, Colo.: F.B. Rothman, 1983.
