= International commercial law =

International commercial law is a body of legal rules, conventions, treaties, domestic legislation and commercial customs or usages, that governs international commercial or business transactions. A transaction will qualify to be international if elements of more than one country are involved.

Lex mercatoria refers to that part of international commercial law which is unwritten, including customary commercial law; customary rules of evidence and procedure; and general principles of commercial law.

== International commercial contracts ==
International commercial contracts are sale transaction agreements made between parties from different countries.

The methods of entering the foreign market, with choice made balancing costs, control and risk, include:

1. Export directly.
2. Use of foreign agent to sell and distribute.
3. Use of foreign distributor to on-sell to local customers.
4. Manufacture products in the foreign country by either setting up business or by acquiring a foreign subsidiary.
5. Licence to a local producer.
6. Enter into a joint venture with a foreign entity.
7. Appoint a franchisee in the foreign country.

== Incoterms 2010 ==
While Incoterms were first published in 1936, it has been revised every 10 years. Incoterms inform sales contract by defining respective obligations, costs, and risks involved in the delivery of goods from seller to buyer. Incoterms 2010, the 8th revision, refers to the newest collection of essential international commercial and trade terms with 11 rules. Incoterm 2010 was effective on and from January 1, 2011. The terms were devised in recognition of non-uniform standard trade usages between various States. When incorporated into a sale contract, the Incoterm code provides a detailed interpretation of rights and obligations between parties.

Any given Incoterm, in most jurisdictions, will not be incorporated into a contract without express or implied reference to it being an Incoterm. They are standardised and published, available for incorporation into international sale contracts at the parties’ discretion. Parties should specifically refer to the Incoterms in the sale contract to indicate incorporation. The International Chamber of Commerce (ICC) is responsible for revising Incoterms periodically to reflect changing practices in international trade.

The Incoterms are classified in 4 different classes:

- Ex (ExW);
- Free (FOB, FAS, FCA);
- Cost (CPT, CIP, CFR, CIF);
- Delivery (DAP, DAT, DDP).

The 11 terms can also be classified into two different categories depending on its contents:

- Rules for any modes of transport: ExW, FCA, CPT, CIP, DAT, DAP, DDP;
- Rules for sea and inland waterway transport: FAS, FOB, CFR, CIF.

== See also ==
- International law
- International trade law
- Public international law
- Law of the Sea
- United Nations
- UNIDROIT
- United Nations Commission on International Trade Law
- CISG
- Lex Mercatoria
