= United Nations Convention on Contracts for the International Sale of Goods =

1980 international sales treaty

CISG
United Nations Convention on Contracts for the International Sale of Goods
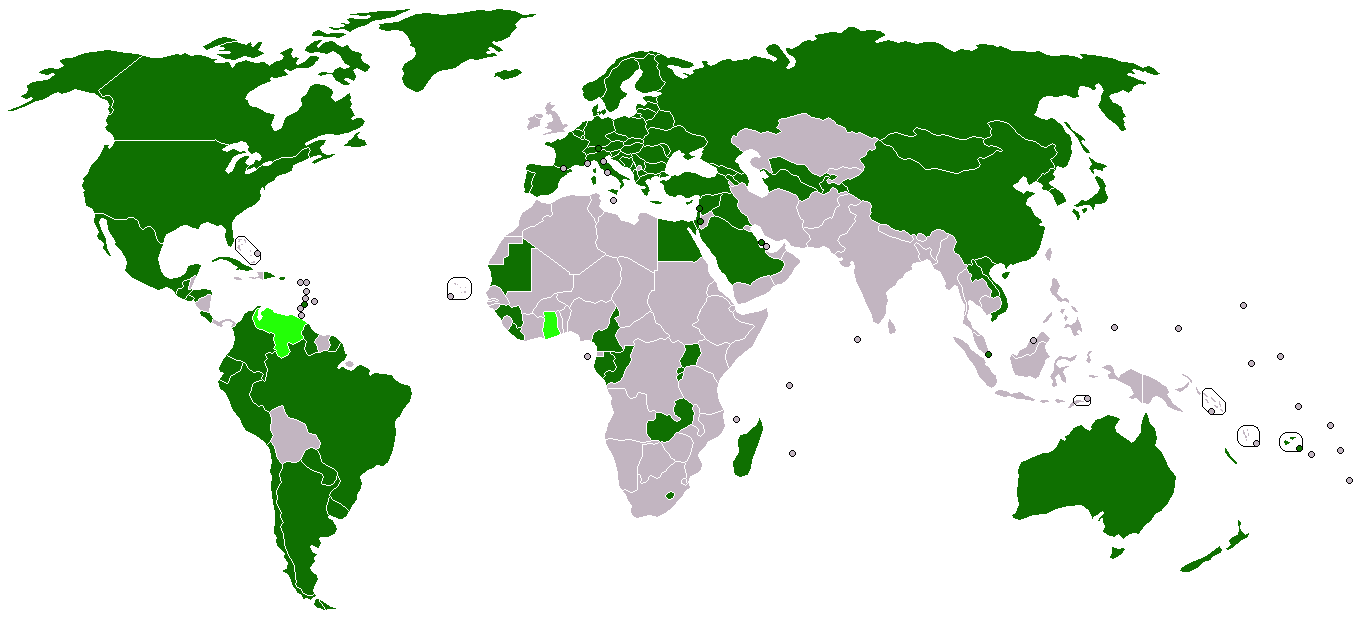
- ratified or acceded signed, but not ratified
- Type: multilateral uniform international sales treaty
- Signed: 11 April 1980
- Location: Vienna, Austria
- Effective: 1 January 1988
- Condition: 10 ratifications
- Signatories: 18
- Parties: 97
- Depositary: The Secretary-General of the United Nations
- Languages: Arabic, Chinese, English, French, Russian, and Spanish

The United Nations Convention on Contracts for the International Sale of Goods (CISG), sometimes known as the Vienna Convention, is a multilateral treaty that establishes a uniform framework for international commerce. (Note: Not to be confused with other treaties signed in Vienna.) As of September 2023, it has been ratified or acceded to by 97 countries, representing two-thirds of world trade.

The CISG facilitates international trade by removing legal barriers among state parties (known as "Contracting States") and providing uniform rules that govern most aspects of a commercial transaction, such as contract formation, the means of delivery, parties' obligations, and remedies for breach of contract. Unless expressly excluded by the contract, the convention is automatically incorporated into the domestic laws of Contracting States and applies directly to a transaction of goods between their nationals.

The CISG is rooted in two earlier international sales treaties first developed in 1930 by the International Institute for the Unification of Private Law (UNIDROIT). When neither convention garnered widespread global support, the United Nations Commission on International Trade Law (UNCITRAL) drew from the existing texts to develop the CISG in 1968. A draft document was submitted to the Conference on the International Sale of Goods held in Vienna, Austria in 1980. Following weeks of negotiation and modification, the CISG was unanimously approved and opened for ratification; it came into force on 1 January 1988 following ratification by 11 countries.

The CISG has been described as one of the greatest achievements of UNCITRAL and the "most successful international document" in unified international sales law, due to its parties representing "every geographical region, every stage of economic development and every major legal, social and economic system". Of the uniform law conventions, the CISG has been described as having "the greatest influence on the law of worldwide trans-border commerce", including among nonmembers. It is also the basis of the annual Willem C. Vis International Commercial Arbitration Moot, one of the largest and most prominent international moot court competitions in the world.

CISG art. 66 is a supplement to an inadequate Incoterms rule; CISG also coworks with Rome I and UCP 600 for standardization of the rules governing Letters of Credit to standardise transactions and benefit all parties and the maritime law about liability of the carrier.

== Adoption ==
As of 1 September 2025, the following 97 states have ratified, acceded to, or succeeded to the convention:

- Albania 13 May 2009
- Argentina 19 July 1983
- Armenia 2 Dec 2008
- Australia 17 March 1988
- Austria 29 Dec 1987, signed 11 April 1980
- Azerbaijan 3 May 2016
- Bahrain 25 Sep 2013
- Belarus 9 Oct 1989
- Belgium 31 Oct 1996
- Benin 29 July 2011
- Bosnia and Herzegovina 12 Jan 1994
- Brazil 4 March 2013
- Bulgaria 9 July 1990
- Burundi 4 Sep 1998
- Cameroon 11 Oct 2017
- Canada 23 April 1991
- Chile 7 Feb 1990, signed 11 April 1980
- China 11 Dec 1986, signed 30 Sep 1981
- Colombia 10 July 2001
- (Republic of the Congo) Congo 11 June 2014
- Costa Rica 12 July 2017
- Croatia 8 June 1998
- Cuba 2 Nov 1994
- Cyprus 7 March 2005
- Czech Republic 30 Sep 1993
- (North Korea) Democratic People's Republic of Korea 27 March 2019
- Denmark 14 Feb 1989, signed 26 May 1981
- Dominican Republic 7 June 2010
- Ecuador 27 Jan 1992
- Egypt 6 Dec 1982
- El Salvador 27 Nov 2006
- Estonia 20 Sep 1993
- Fiji 7 June 2017
- Finland 15 Dec 1987, signed 26 May 1981
- France 6 Aug 1982, signed 27 Aug 1981
- Gabon 15 Dec 2004
- (Georgia (country)) Georgia 16 Aug 1994
- Germany 21 Dec 1989, signed 26 May 1981
- Greece 12 Jan 1998
- Guatemala 11 Dec 2019
- Guinea 23 Jan 1991
- Guyana 25 Sep 2014
- Honduras 10 Oct 2002
- Hungary 16 June 1983, signed 11 April 1980
- Iceland 10 May 2001
- Iraq 5 March 1990
- Israel 22 Jan 2002
- Italy 11 Dec 1986, signed 30 Sep 1981
- Japan 1 July 2008
- Kyrgyzstan 11 May 1999
- Latvia 31 July 1997
- Laos 24 Sep 2019
- Lebanon 21 Nov 2008
- Lesotho 18 June 1981 (signed and ratified)
- Liberia 16 Sep 2005
- Liechtenstein 30 April 2019
- Lithuania 18 Jan 1995
- Luxembourg 30 Jan 1997
- Madagascar 24 Sep 2014
- Mauritania 20 Aug 1999
- Mexico 29 Dec 1987
- Moldova 13 Oct 1994
- Mongolia 31 Dec 1997
- Montenegro 23 Oct 2006
- Netherlands (European territory and Aruba) 13 Dec 1990, signed 29 May 1981
- New Zealand 22 Sep 1994
- North Macedonia 22 Nov 2006
- Norway 20 Jul 1988, signed 26 May 1981
- State of Palestine 29 Dec 2017
- Paraguay 13 Jan 2006
- Peru 25 March 1999
- Poland 19 May 1995, signed 28 Sep 1981
- Portugal 23 Sep 2020
- (South Korea) Republic of Korea 17 Feb 2004
- Romania 22 May 1991
- (Russia) Russian Federation 16 Aug 1990
- Rwanda 22 Sep 2023
- Saint Vincent and the Grenadines 12 Sep 2000
- San Marino 22 Feb 2012
- Saudi Arabia 3 Aug 2023
- Serbia 12 March 2001
- Singapore 16 Feb 1995, signed 11 April 1980
- Slovakia 28 May 1993
- Slovenia 7 Jan 1994
- Spain 24 July 1990
- Sweden 15 Dec 1987, signed 26 May 1981
- Switzerland 21 Feb 1990
- (Syria) Syrian Arab Republic 19 Oct 1982
- Turkey 7 July 2010
- Turkmenistan 4 May 2022
- Uganda 12 Feb 1992
- Ukraine 3 Jan 1990
- United States of America 11 Dec 1986, signed 31 Aug 1981
- Uruguay 25 Jan 1999
- Uzbekistan 27 Nov 1996
- Vietnam 18 Dec 2015
- Zambia 6 June 1986

The convention has been signed, but not ratified, by Ghana (11 April 1980) and Venezuela (28 September 1981).

The former Yugoslavia had signed and ratified the Convention on 11 April 1980 and 27 March 1985, respectively. Bosnia and Herzegovina, Croatia, Slovenia and North Macedonia became parties by succession. Czechoslovakia had signed and ratified the Convention on 1 September 1981 and 5 March 1990, respectively. The Czech Republic and Slovakia became parties by succession.

== Language, structure, and content ==
The CISG is written using "plain language that refers to things and events for which there are words of common content". This was intended to allow national legal systems to be transcended through the use of a lingua franca that would be mutually intelligible among different cultural, legal, and linguistic groups. and to avoid "words associated with specific domestic legal nuances". As is customary in UN conventions, all six official languages of the UN are equally authentic.

The CISG is divided into four parts:

=== Part I: Sphere of Application and General Provisions (Articles 1–13) ===
The CISG applies to contracts of the sale of goods between parties whose places of business are in different States, when the States are Contracting States (Article 1(1)(a)). Given the significant number of Contracting States, this is the usual path to the CISG's applicability.

The CISG also applies if the parties are situated in different countries (which need not be Contracting States) and the conflict of law rules lead to the application of the law of a Contracting State. For example, a contract between a Japanese trader and a Brazilian trader may contain a clause that arbitration will be in Sydney under Australian law with the consequence that the CISG would apply. A number of States have declared they will not be bound by this condition.

The CISG is intended to apply to commercial goods and products only. With some limited exceptions, it does not apply to personal, family, or household goods, nor does it apply to auctions, ships, aircraft, or intangibles and services. The position of computer software is 'controversial' and will depend upon various conditions and situations.

Importantly, parties to a contract may exclude or vary the application of the CISG.

Interpretation of the CISG must consider the "international character" of the convention, the need for uniform application, and the need for good faith in international trade.

A key point of controversy is whether or not a contract requires a written memorial to be binding. The CISG allows for a sale to be oral or unsigned, but in some countries, contracts are not valid unless written. In many nations, however, oral contracts are accepted, and those States had no objection to signing, so States with a strict written requirement exercised their ability to exclude those articles relating to oral contracts, enabling them to sign as well.

The CISG, by its own definition, does not govern all aspects of sales contracts subject to its application. The matters listed in its Article 4 must be filled in by the applicable national law under due consideration of the conflict of law rules applicable at the place of jurisdiction. Gaps referring to matters that are governed by the CISG but not expressly settled therein (a gap praeter legem), however, are to be preferably filled in accordance with "the principles on which [the CISG] is based," and only in the absence of those should national law be applied.

=== Part II: Formation of the Contract (Articles 14–24) ===
An offer to contract must be addressed to a person, be sufficiently definite – that is, describe the goods, quantity, and price – and indicate an intention for the offeror to be bound on acceptance. The CISG does not appear to recognise common law unilateral contracts but, subject to clear indication by the offeror, treats any proposal not addressed to a specific person as only an invitation to make an offer. Further, where there is no explicit price or procedure to implicitly determine price, then the parties are assumed to have agreed upon a price based upon that 'generally charged at the time of the conclusion of the contract for such goods sold under comparable circumstances'.

Generally, an offer may be revoked provided the withdrawal reaches the offeree before or at the same time as the offer, or before the offeree has sent an acceptance. Some offers may not be revoked; for example when the offeree reasonably relied upon the offer as being irrevocable. The CISG requires a positive act to indicate acceptance; silence or inactivity are not an acceptance.

The CISG attempts to resolve the common situation where an offeree's reply to an offer accepts the original offer, but attempts to change the conditions. The CISG says that any change to the original conditions is a rejection of the offer—it is a counter-offer—unless the modified terms do not materially alter the terms of the offer. Changes to price, payment, quality, quantity, delivery, liability of the parties, and arbitration conditions may all materially alter the terms of the offer.

=== Part III: Sale of Goods (Articles 25–88) ===
Articles 25–88; sale of goods, obligations of the seller, obligations of the buyer, passing of risk, obligations common to both buyer and seller.

The CISG defines the duty of the seller, 'stating the obvious', as the seller must deliver the goods, hand over any documents relating to them, and transfer the property in the goods, as required by the contract. Similarly, the duty of the buyer is to take all steps 'which could reasonably be expected' to take delivery of the goods, and to pay for them.

Generally, the goods must be of the quality, quantity, and description required by the contract, be suitably packaged and fit for purpose. The seller is obliged to deliver goods that are not subject to claims from a third party for infringement of industrial or intellectual property rights in the State where the goods are to be sold. The buyer is obliged to promptly examine the goods and, subject to some qualifications, must advise the seller of any lack of conformity within 'a reasonable time' and no later than within two years of receipt.

The CISG describes when the risk passes from the seller to the buyer but it has been observed that in practice most contracts define the seller's delivery obligations quite precisely by adopting an established shipment term, such as FOB and CIF.

Remedies of the buyer and seller depend upon the character of a breach of the contract. If the breach is fundamental, then the other party is substantially deprived of what it expected to receive under the contract. Provided that an objective test shows that the breach could not have been foreseen, then the contract may be avoided and the aggrieved party may claim damages. Where part performance of a contract has occurred, then the performing party may recover any payment made or good supplied; this contrasts with the common law where there is generally no right to recover a good supplied unless title has been retained or damages are inadequate, only a right to claim the value of the good.

If the breach is not fundamental, then the contract is not avoided and remedies may be sought including claiming damages, specific performance, and adjustment of price. Damages that may be awarded conform to the common law rules in Hadley v Baxendale but it has been argued the test of foreseeability is substantially broader and consequently more generous to the aggrieved party.

The CISG excuses a party from liability to a claim of damages where a failure to perform is attributable to an impediment beyond the party's, or a third party sub-contractor's, control that could not have been reasonably expected. Such an extraneous event might elsewhere be referred to as force majeure, and frustration of the contract.

Where a seller has to refund the price paid, then the seller must also pay interest to the buyer from the date of payment. It has been said the interest rate is based on rates current in the seller's State '[s]ince the obligation to pay interest partakes of the seller's obligation to make restitution and not of the buyer's right to claim damages', though this has been debated. In a mirror of the seller's obligations, where a buyer has to return goods the buyer is accountable for any benefits received.

=== Part IV: Final Provisions (Articles 89–101) ===
Articles 89–101 (final provisions) include how and when the Convention comes into force, permitted reservations and declarations, and the application of the convention to international sales where both States concerned have the same or similar law on the subject.

The Part IV Articles, along with the Preamble, are sometime characterized as being addressed "primarily to States", not to businesspeople attempting to use the convention for international trade. They may, however, have a significant impact upon the CISG's practical applicability, thus requiring careful scrutiny when determining each particular case.

== Commentary on the Convention ==
It has been remarked that the CISG expresses a practice-based, flexible and "relational" character. It places no or very few restrictions of form on formation or adjustment of contracts; in case of non-performance (or over-performance) it offers a wide array of interim measures before the aggrieved party must resort to avoiding the contract (e.g. unilateral pro-rated price reduction (Art. 50); suspension of performance (art. 71); the availability of cure as a matter of right of the defaulting party (subject to some reservations, Art. 48); choice between expectation and market-based damages, etc.); additionally, the CISG does not operate under a "perfect tender" rule and its criteria for conformity are functional rather than formal (art. 35). Additionally, its rules of interpretation rely heavily on custom as well as on manifest acts rather than on intent (Art. 8). The CISG does include a so-called Nachlass rule (i.e., legacy rule), but its scope is relatively limited. On the other hand, its good faith obligation may seem relatively limited and in any case obscure (Art. 7). All communications require "reasonable time."

Although the convention has been accepted by a large number of States, it has been the subject of some criticism. For example, the drafting nations have been accused of being incapable of agreement on a code that "concisely and clearly states universal principles of sales law", and through the convention's invitation to interpret taking regard of the convention's "international character" gives judges the opportunity to develop "diverse meaning". Put more bluntly, the CISG has been described as "a variety of vague standards and compromises that appear inconsistent with commercial interests".

A contrary view is that the CISG is "written in plain business language," which allows judges the opportunity to make the Convention workable in a range of sales situations. It has been said "the drafting style is lucid and the wording simple and uncluttered by complicated subordinating clauses", and the "general sense" can be grasped on the first reading without the need to be a sales expert.

Uniform application of the CISG is problematic because of the reluctance of courts to use "solutions adopted on the same point by courts in other countries", resulting in inconsistent decisions. For example, in a case involving the export to Germany by a Swiss company of New Zealand mussels with a level of cadmium in excess of German standards, the German Supreme Court held that it is not the duty of the seller to ensure that goods meet German public health regulations. This contrasted with a later decision in which an Italian cheese exporter failed to meet French packaging regulations, and the French court decided it was the duty of the seller to ensure compliance with French regulations.

These two cases were held by one commentator to be an example of contradictory jurisprudence. Another commentator, however, saw the cases as not contradictory, as the German case could be distinguished on a number of points. The French court chose not to consider the German court's decision, in its published decision. (Precedent, foreign or not, is not legally binding in civil law.)

CISG advocates are also concerned that the natural inclination of judges is to interpret the CISG using the methods familiar to them from their own State rather than attempting to apply the general principles of the convention or the rules of private international law. This is despite the comment from one highly respected academic that 'it should be a rare, or non-existent, case where there are no relevant general principles to which a court might have recourse' under the CISG. This concern was supported by research of the CISG Advisory Council which said, in the context of the interpretation of Articles 38 and 39, there is a tendency for courts to interpret the articles in the light of their own State's law, and some States have 'struggled to apply [the articles] appropriately'. In one of a number of criticisms of Canadian court decisions to use local legislation to interpret the CISG, one commentator said the CISG was designed to 'replace existing domestic laws and caselaw,' and attempts to resolve gaps should not be by 'reference to relevant provisions of [local] sales law'.

Critics of the multiple language versions of the CISG assert it is inevitable the versions will not be totally consistent because of translation errors and the untranslatability of 'subtle nuances' of language. This argument, though with some validity, would not seem peculiar to the CISG but common to any and all treaties that exist in multiple languages. The reductio ad absurdum would seem to be that all international treaties should exist in only a single language, something which is clearly neither practical nor desirable.

Other criticisms of the convention are that it is incomplete, there is no mechanism for updating the provisions, and no international panel to resolve interpretation issues. For example, the CISG does not govern the validity of the contract, nor does it consider electronic contracts. However, legal matters relating to the use of electronic communications in relation to contracts for international sale of goods have been eventually dealt with in a comprehensive manner in the United Nations Convention on the Use of Electronic Communications in International Contracts. Moreover, it is not to be forgotten that the CISG is complemented by the Convention on the Limitation Period in the International Sale of Goods with respect to the limitation of actions due to passage of time.

Despite the critics, a supporter has said '[t]he fact that the costly ignorance of the early days, when many lawyers ignored the CISG entirely, has been replaced by too much enthusiasm that leads to ... oversimplification, cannot be blamed on the CISG'.

== Reservations ==
The relatively widespread adoption of the CISG stems from its allowing Contracting States to take exception to certain specified articles; this flexibility was instrumental in convincing states with disparate legal traditions to subscribe to an otherwise uniform code. Contracting States can lodge reservations, referred to therein as "declarations", which exempt them from certain provisions. Nevertheless, the vast majority of parties—69 of the current 92 Contracting States—have acceded to the Convention without any declaration.

Of the approximate quarter of parties that have taken reservations, most have done so with respect to one or some of the following:

- opting out of article 1(1)(b) CISG, which allows for the application of the CISG in cases when the rules of private international law point at the law of a contracting State as the law applicable to the contract for sale of goods (article 95 CISG);
- mandatory written form of the contract for sale of goods (articles 11, 12 and 96 CISG);
- opting out of the application of Part II or Part III CISG (article 92 CISG);
- not applying the CISG to contracts concluded between parties with place of business in "which have the same or closely related legal rules on matters governed" by the CISG (article 94 CISG).

Some existing declarations have been reviewed and withdrawn by States. The Nordic countries (except Iceland) had originally opted out of the application of Part II under Article 92, but rescinded this reservation and became party to Part II, except for trade among themselves (to which the CISG is not applied as a whole due to a declaration lodged under Article 94). Likewise, China withdrew its written form declaration with effect from 1 August 2013, and Latvia, Lithuania and Hungary have withdrawn their written form declarations. The Czech Republic has withdrawn its declaration preventing the application of article 1(1)(b). The Government of Ukraine declared its intention to withdraw the "Written Form" declaration.

Some countries have expanded rather than restricted CISG application by removing one of the cumulative conditions for application within the CISG. For example, Israeli law stipulates that the CISG will apply equally to a party whose place of business is in a State that is not a Contracting State.

== Major absentees ==
India, South Africa, Nigeria, and the United Kingdom are the major trading countries that have not yet acceded to the CISG. The absence of the United Kingdom, a leading jurisdiction for the choice of law in international commercial contracts, has been attributed variously to the government not viewing its accession as a legislative priority, a lack of interest from business in supporting accession, opposition from a number of large and influential organisations, a lack of public service resources, and a danger that London would lose its edge in international arbitration and litigation. In 2020, the British Government informed that it had no plan to join the CISG.

There is significant academic disagreement as to whether Taiwan and Macau are deemed parties to the CISG due to China's status as a party. The issue has been clarified with respect to Hong Kong with the deposit of a declaration of extension of territorial application by China. The Convention was incorporated into Hong Kong law through the Sale of Goods (United Nations Convention) Ordinance, which commenced on 1 December 2022.

== Future directions ==
Greater acceptance of the CISG will come from three directions. First, it is likely that within the global legal profession, as the number of new lawyers educated in the CISG increases, the existing Contracting States will embrace the CISG, appropriately interpret the articles, and demonstrate a greater willingness to accept precedents from other Contracting States.

Second, businesses will increasingly pressure both lawyers and governments to make international commercial disputes over the sale of goods less expensive, and reduce the risk of being forced to use a legal system that may be completely alien to their own. Both of these objectives can be achieved through use of the CISG.

Finally, UNCITRAL will arguably need to develop a mechanism to further develop the convention and to resolve conflicting interpretation issues. This will make it more attractive to both businesspeople and potential Contracting States.

=== Prospective Contracting States ===
Ethiopia and Rwanda have adopted laws authorising the adoption of the CISG, which will enter into force in each country after the instrument of accession is deposited with the Secretary-General of the United Nations; as of September 2023, Rwanda became a member state of the convention, Ethiopia has not as of September 2025.

== Differences with country legislation relating to the sale of goods ==
Depending on the country, the CISG can represent a small or significant departure from local legislation relating to the sale of goods, and in this can provide important benefits to companies from one contracting state that import goods into other states that have ratified the CISG.

=== Differences with U.S. legislation (the UCC) ===
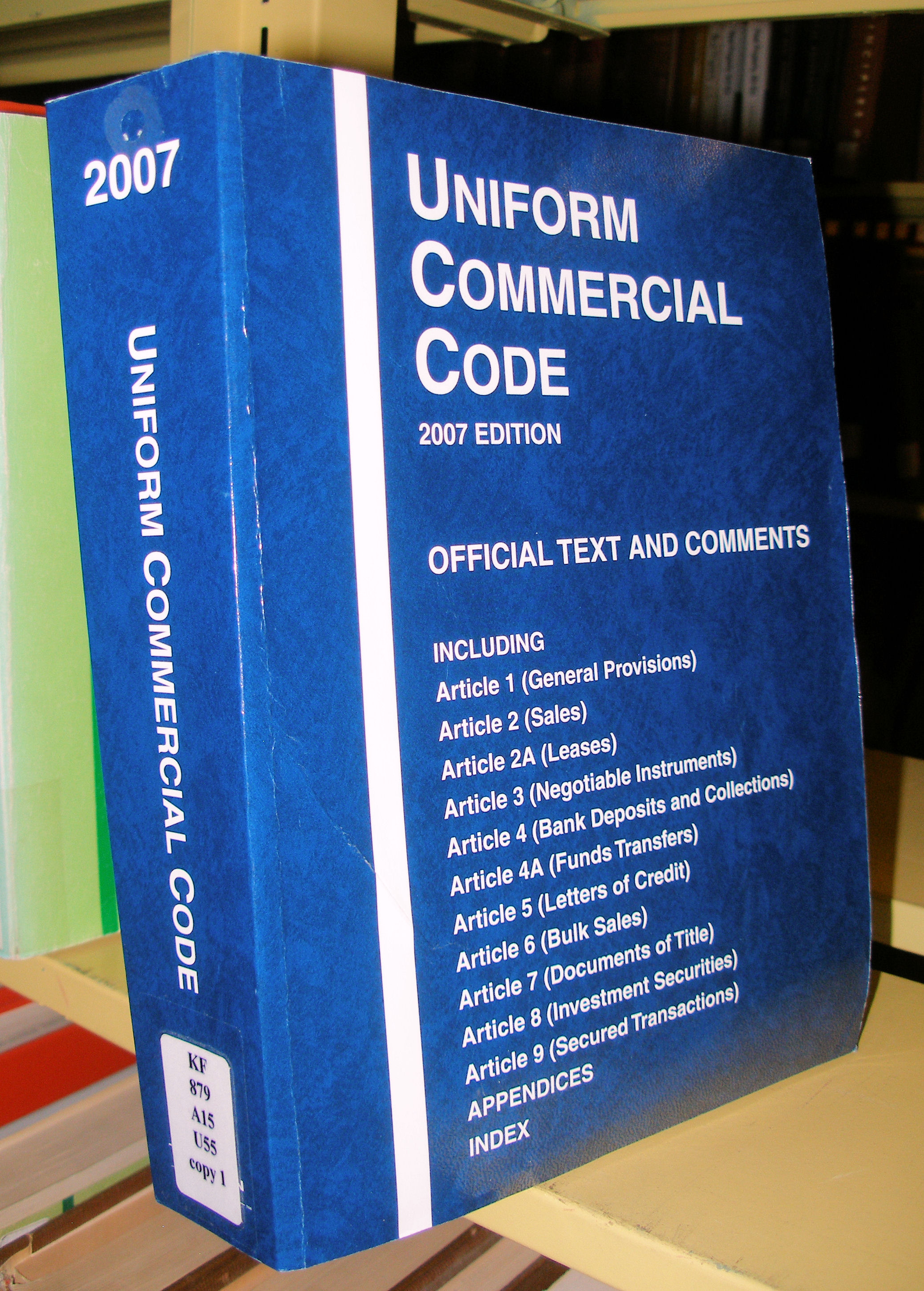
The official 2007 edition of the UCC.

In the U.S., all 50 states have, to varying degrees, adopted common legislation referred to as the Uniform Commercial Code ("UCC"). UCC Articles 1 (General Provisions) and 2 (Sales) are generally similar to the CISG. However, the UCC differs from the CISG in some respects, such as the following areas that tend to reflect more general aspects of the U.S. legal system:

Terms of Acceptance – Under the CISG, acceptance occurs when it is received by the offeror, a rule similar to many civil law jurisdictions which contemplate for service to be effective upon receipt. By contrast, the U.S. legal system often applies the so-called "mailbox rule" by which, acceptance, like service, can occur at the time the offeree transmits it to the offeror.

"Battle of the Forms" – Under the CISG, a reply to an offer that purports to be an acceptance, but has additions, limitations, or other modifications, is generally considered a rejection and counteroffer. The UCC, on the other hand, tries to avoid the "battle of the forms" that can result from such a rule, and allows an expression of acceptance to be operative, unless the acceptance states that it is conditioned on the offeror consenting to the additional or different terms contained in the acceptance.

Writing Requirement – Unless otherwise specified by a ratifying State, the CISG does not require that a sales contract be reduced to a writing. Under the UCC's statute of frauds (inherited from the common law), contracts selling goods for a price of $500 or more are generally not enforceable unless in writing.

Nevertheless, because the U.S. has ratified the CISG, it has the force of federal law and supersedes UCC-based state law under the Supremacy Clause of the Constitution. Among the U.S. reservations to the CISG is the provision that the CISG will apply only as to contracts with parties located in other CISG Contracting States, a reservation permitted by the CISG in Article 95. Therefore, in international contracts for the sale of goods between a U.S. entity and an entity of a Contracting State, the CISG will apply unless the contract's choice of law clause specifically excludes CISG terms.

Conversely, in "international" contracts for the sale of goods between a U.S. entity and an entity of a non-Contracting State, to be adjudicated by a U.S. court, the CISG will not apply, and the contract will be governed by the domestic law applicable according to private international law rules.

=== Differences with UK legislation ===
The sale of goods in the UK is regulated by:

- the Sale of Goods Act 1979, (SGA) which is designed for both business-to-consumer and business-to-business transactions
- the Consumer Rights Act 2015 (CRA: 2015) which provides solely for business-to-consumer transactions

Although the rights are broadly similar in business-to-consumer and business-to-business transactions, the remedies differ. Broadly speaking, the rights for these transactions are also similar across EU states.

== See also ==
- Commercial law
- International Commercial Terms (Incoterms)
- International trade law
