= Electronic Communications Convention =

United Nations General Assembly resolution adopted in 2005

United Nations Convention on the Use of Electronic Communications in International Contracts
- Signed: 23 November 2005
- Location: New York, US
- Effective: 1 March 2013
- Condition: 3 States parties
- Signatories: 18
- Parties: 21
- Depositary: Secretary-General of the United Nations
- Languages: 6 (Arabic, Chinese, English, French, Russian, Spanish)

The United Nations Convention on the Use of Electronic Communications in International Contracts (the "Electronic Communications Convention", ECC or e-cc) is a treaty that aims at facilitating the use of electronic communications in international trade. It was prepared by the United Nations Commission on International Trade Law (UNCITRAL) and adopted by the United Nations General Assembly on 23 November 2005. Pursuant to Article 23, it entered into force on 1 March 2013, the first day of the month after six months passed following adoption by three States parties, namely the Dominican Republic, Honduras, and Singapore.

== Adoption ==
The following twenty-one States have ratified, accepted, approved, acceded to, or succeeded to the Electronic Communications Convention:

- Azerbaijan
- Bahrain
- Belize
- Benin
- Cameroon
- (Republic of the Congo) Congo
- Dominican Republic
- El Salvador
- Fiji
- Honduras
- Iran
- Kiribati
- Mongolia
- Montenegro
- Paraguay
- Philippines
- (Russia) Russian Federation
- Singapore
- Sri Lanka
- Thailand
- Tuvalu

The Electronic Communications Convention has been signed, but not yet ratified, by the Central African Republic, China, Colombia, Iran, Lebanon, Madagascar, Panama, the Republic of Korea, Saudi Arabia, Senegal, and Sierra Leone.

Other states that have publicly declared their intention of adopting the Electronic Communications Convention include Australia, and Mauritius. Canada has prepared uniform legislation to facilitate the adoption of the ECC at the State level, which has been enacted by Ontario and Saskatchewan. Similar legislation has been prepared in the United States and on 10 February 2016 President Obama sent a message to the Senate asking for accession of the convention. In Australia, all states and territories and the Commonwealth have passed amending legislation to conform to the convention.

The relevance of the Convention goes beyond its adoption as a treaty. More than 30 States have enacted the substantive provisions of the Convention domestically. This contributes to modernizing and harmonizing the law of electronic transactions. However, the convention has to be formally adopted in order to get full international law effect.

== Background and policy goals ==
UNCITRAL has been active in formulating uniform legislative standards for the use of electronic communications in trade since the 1980s. A first result of such work was the adoption of the UNCITRAL Model Law on Electronic Commerce, 1996 (MLEC), followed by the UNCITRAL Model Law on Electronic Signatures (MLES), 2001. However, a number of issues remained unsolved, namely, the possibility to enable to use of electronic communications in cases where a formal written requirement is mandated by another treaty, usually drafted before the widespread use of electronic means. Moreover, as model laws may be enacted with variations in the various jurisdictions, it was felt that establishing a core of common provisions would increase uniformity and therefore predictability in international trade law. Finally, it was felt that some of the provisions of the MLEC and of the MLES could be outdated and complemented.

As a result, the Electronic Communications Convention addresses different policy goals: 1) it removes obstacles arising from formal requirements contained in other international trade law treaties; 2) it provides a common substantive core to the law of electronic communications, thus ensuring a higher level of uniformity both in the legislative text and in its interpretation; 3) it updates and complements the provisions of the MLEC and of the MLES; 4) it provides core legislation on electronic communications to those States not having yet any, or having partial and insufficient provisions.

Article 14.5.1 of the Comprehensive and Progressive Agreement for Trans-Pacific Partnership sets forth that: "Each Party shall maintain a legal framework governing electronic transactions consistent with the principles of the UNCITRAL Model Law on Electronic Commerce 1996 or the United Nations Convention on the Use of Electronic Communications in International Contracts, done at New York November 23, 2005".

Article 12.10 of the Regional Comprehensive Economic Partnership sets forth that: "Each Party shall adopt or maintain a legal framework governing electronic transactions, taking into account the UNCITRAL Model Law on Electronic Commerce 1996, the United Nations Convention on the Use of Electronic Communications in International Contracts done at New York on 23 November 2005, or other applicable international conventions and model laws relating to electronic commerce".

== Provisions ==
=== General provisions ===
With respect to substantive provisions, the Electronic Communications Convention builds extensively, on the fundamental principles of the uniform law of electronic commerce developed by UNCITRAL (non-discrimination, technological neutrality, functional equivalence, and irrelevance of place of origin) as well as on several specific articles of the MLEC and of the MLES.

The Electronic Communications Convention is also inspired by a number of provisions of the CISG, especially in the parts relating to scope of application, to general principles and to final clauses. Thus, article 3 ECC corresponds to article 6 CISG, giving effect to the principle of party autonomy. Article 5 ECC is the equivalent of article 7 CISG, introducing a duty of uniform interpretation of the treaty, and defining the ancillary criteria for interpretation.

Article 6 builds on the notion of "place of business" introduced by the CISG and adapts it to the electronic environment. In particular, it is specified that the location of equipment and technology supporting an information system, or the location where the information system may be accessed by other parties, are not, as such, decisive to determine the place of business. Those elements may, however, concur to determine the place of business. Similar considerations apply to the use of a domain name or electronic mail address connected to a specific country. The sources of paras. 2 and 3 of article 6 ECC are found in article 15(4)(a) and (b) MLEC.

=== Scope of application ===
Article 1 ECC defines the scope of application of the convention. The source of inspiration of that article is clearly article 1 of the United Nations Convention on Contracts for the International Sale of Goods (CISG). However, a major difference lies in the fact that the ECC, unlike the CISG, does not require that the concerned parties have their places of business in States parties to the ECC. Therefore, the ECC applies if the law applicable to the communications is the law of a State party to the ECC, or if the parties have validly chosen as the law applicable to their communications the law of a State party to the ECC. A third option is the application of the substantive provisions of the ECC if chosen by virtue of agreement of the parties.

According to art. 4(a) ECC “Communication” means any statement, declaration, demand, notice or request, including an offer and the acceptance of an offer, that the parties are required to make or choose to make in connection with the formation or performance of a contract; it is therefore not necessary that the contract is concluded. Moreover, it is possible that only some or one clause of the contract are in electronic form, including, for instance, the arbitration clause. Moreover, according to art. 4(b) ECC “Electronic communication” means any communication that the parties make by means of data messages; the notion of data message is defined in art. 4 (c) ECC along the lines of the same definition contained in the MLEC and MLES. The outcome of such broad approach is that the notion of electronic communication encompasses the use of different technologies, including, e.g., SMS, but also digital audio and video recording.

Art. 2(1)(a) ECC is inspired by article 2(a) CISG. Both provisions aim at excluding consumers' transactions from the scope of application of the respective conventions. Art. 2(1)(b) ECC excludes from the scope of application of the convention certain fields that already enjoy uniform legal provisions, contractually (e.g., international payments systems) or otherwise (e.g., treaties relating to securities held with an intermediary). Art. 2(2) ECC excludes from the scope of application of the convention electronic transferable records. These are electronic records that entitle the entity controlling them to the delivery of goods or the payment of a sum, as evidenced in the record. This exclusion is due to the fact that uniform legal standards for the functional equivalence of notions such as “possession” in the electronic world have yet to be developed. Since 2011, UNCITRAL Working Group IV (Electronic Commerce) is tasked with defining those standards.

States may vary the scope of application of the convention by lodging declarations. Thus, the declaration foreseen in article 19(1)(a) limits the application of the convention to cases when all the States where the parties involved in the transaction have their place of business are contracting States. This is the same mechanism envisaged in article 1(1)(a) CISG. Article 19(1)(b) limits the application of the convention to cases when the parties so choose.

Article 19(2) ECC gives States the possibility to exclude certain matters from the scope of application of the ECC. These exceptions could be similar to those made in corresponding national legislation: Singapore has lodged this type of declaration upon ratification of the Electronic Communications Convention.

Last, but not least, parties may vary or derogate from any provision of the Convention under its article 3. This is a provision common in international trade law treaties, where freedom of contract is considered an overarching principle. However, in practice there might be limits of public order, or other mandatory provisions, that might limit the freedom of the parties.

More about the ECC and its scope and application as regards the CISG can be found at the IICl- Pace CISG Database.

=== Substantive provisions ===
Article 8 ECC sets forth at the international level the principle of non-discrimination of electronic communications already established, for national legislation, in article 5 MLEC.

Article 9 ECC is the core provision establishing the parameters for functional equivalence between electronic and paper-based communications.

In particular, article 9(2) ECC deals with functional equivalence of the notion of "written form". The provision follows that of article 6(1) MLEC.

Article 9(3) ECC deals with functional equivalence for "signature". In practice, this provision enables cross-border recognition of all types of electronic signatures. To do so, art. 9(3) ECC departs from both UNCITRAL relevant precedents, i.e. article 7(1) MLEC and article 12 MLES. Two major innovations were introduced with respect to article 7(1) MLEC: a) the notion of "person's approval" was substituted with that of "party's intention" in order to better capture the various functions associated with signatures, which go well beyond mere approval; and b) a safety clause was introduced in article 9(3)(b)(ii) ECC to ensure that electronic signatures that provide for a method to identify the party and to indicate the party's intention, and that have indeed fulfilled that function by themselves or together with other evidence, may not be repudiated. In other words, if it is possible to identify the signatory of an electronic communication, that signatory may not challenge the signature on the basis of the signature's method or nature.

Article 9(4) and (5) ECC provides for the functional equivalent of original, along the lines of article 8(1) and (3) MLEC.

Article 10 ECC deals with time and place of dispatch and receipt of electronic communications. Its predecessor is article 15 MLEC.

Article 10(1) ECC innovates on article 15(1) MLEC: in the ECC, the electronic communication is dispatched when it leaves the system under the control of the originator, while in the MLEC it (or, better, the data message in the terminology of that Model Law) has to enter a system outside the control of the originator: the rule has been changed in order to avoid consequences for the originator when the message may not enter the information system for reasons not under control of the originator (e.g., firewall; filter; system down...).

Article 10(2) ECC follows article 15(2) MLEC in introducing the difference between designated and non-designated electronic address for determining the time of receipt of an electronic communication. Article 10(2) ECC contains a novel element by requiring that the recipient should be aware that the communication was sent (and the communication is capable of being retrieved), while the provision of the MLEC requires actual retrieval by the addressee, which might again expose the originator to liability for circumstances under the addressee's control.

Article 10(3) ECC corresponds to article 15(4) MLEC. This provision must be read in conjunction with article 6 ECC, as must be article 10(4) ECC.

=== Final clauses ===
The Electronic Communications Convention contains, in its Chapter IV, rather elaborate final clauses. Final clauses aimed at modifying the scope of application of the convention are discussed above.

==== Relation to regional legislation ====
Article 17 ECC sets forth the applicable rules for those cases where electronic communications fall under the legislative authority of a regional economic integration organisation (REIO). The rationale of article 17 is, on the one hand, to ensure that the convention will not be applied to commercial relations falling under the scope of application of the legislation of the REIO and, on the other hand, to clarify the distribution of legislative power between REIOs (and therefore unaffected by the convention) and national States (and therefore under the scope of the Convention in case of cross-border exchanges). In other words, the Convention does not intend to interfere with regional regimes.

In particular, article 17(2) ECC requires the REIO that intends to become a party to the ECC to deposit a declaration on the distribution of competences between the REIO and its member States. The REIO member States are supposed to do the same. Article 17(4) contains the "disconnection clause" that should ensure that REIOs' legal regimes are unaffected by the operation of the Electronic Communications Convention.

The matter has important practical consequences. In fact, the absence of an agreed declaration on the distribution of competences between the European Union and its member States has prevented those States from signing or becoming a party to the Electronic Communications Convention: among the States that are signatory or party to the convention, none is an EU member State.

==== Interaction with other international trade law treaties ====
One major goal of the Electronic Communications Convention is the removal of obstacles to international trade arising from the insertion of formal requirements in treaties concluded before the broad adoption of electronic means. Article 20 ECC lists several treaties prepared by UNCITRAL as treaties that will be "electrified" by the adoption of the ECC. In other words, by virtue of adoption of the ECC formal requirements contained in those treaties, especially written form requirements, will be satisfied with the use of electronic communications under the conditions set forth in the ECC.

The two treaties whose interaction with the ECC has been most discussed are the United Nations Convention on Contracts for the International Sale of Goods (CISG) and the Convention on the Recognition and Enforcement of Foreign Arbitral Awards (New York Convention). The relationship between ECC and CISG relates to the issues such as formation of contracts, including the time and place of dispatch and receipt of electronic communications, and the use of automated agents; and the satisfaction of form requirements such as "writing", "original" and "signed" through functional equivalence rules. The relationship between ECC and the New York Convention pertains to matters such as the recognition and enforcement of arbitration agreements and arbitral awards in electronic form.

Some UNCITRAL treaties are excluded from the list in article 20, in particular, the United Nations Convention on the Carriage of Goods by Sea, 1978 (the "Hamburg Rules") and the United Nations Convention on International Bills of Exchange and International Promissory Notes, 1988. The reason for the exclusion is that those two treaties contain provisions on negotiable documents, which are excluded from the scope of the ECC (art. 2(2)). The United Nations Convention on Contracts for the International Carriage of Goods Wholly or Partly by Sea, 2008 (the "Rotterdam Rules"), which was also prepared by UNCITRAL and contains provisions on electronic transferable records, was concluded after the ECC.

Article 20(2) ECC indicates that the convention will apply also to all other treaties where the exchange of electronic communications is relevant, unless a State declares not to be bound by this provision. Even if this "opt out" declaration is made, the declaring State may still choose, under article 20(3) ECC, certain treaties to which the ECC will apply.

Article 20(4) ECC gives the possibility of a State to prevent the interaction of the ECC with a given treaty even if the State has not lodged any other declaration regarding the convention's scope of application. In other words, under article 20(3) ECC the State makes a general opt out and a selective opt in, while under article 20(4) the State makes a general opt in, and a selective opt out.

== See also ==
- MLEC and MLES
- Rotterdam Rules

== Bibliography And References ==
=== Bibliography ===
- The UNCITRAL law library bibliography
- United Nations Conference on Trade and Development Report, "Information Economy Report 2006: The development perspective." (2006), Chapter 8.
- Amelia H. Boss and Wolfgang Kilian (eds), The United Nations Convention on the Use of Electronic Communications in International Contracts: An In-Depth Guide and Sourcebook. (2008) provides a detailed commentary of the provisions of the convention and other related aspects.
