= Incoterms =

Standardized contract terms regarding transportation and delivery

The Incoterms or International Commercial Terms are a series of pre-defined commercial terms published by the International Chamber of Commerce (ICC) relating to international commercial law. Incoterms define the responsibilities of exporters and importers in the arrangement of shipments and the transfer of liability involved at various stages of the transaction. They are widely used in international commercial transactions or procurement processes and their use is encouraged by trade councils, courts and international lawyers. A series of three-letter trade terms related to common contractual sales practices, the Incoterms rules are intended primarily to clearly communicate the tasks, costs, and risks associated with the global or international transportation and delivery of goods. Incoterms inform sales contracts defining respective obligations, costs, and risks involved in the delivery of goods from the seller to the buyer, but they do not themselves conclude a contract, determine the price payable, currency or credit terms, govern contract law or define where title to goods transfers.

The Incoterms rules are accepted by governments, legal authorities, and practitioners worldwide for the interpretation of most commonly used terms in international trade. They are intended to reduce or remove altogether uncertainties arising from the differing interpretations of the rules in different countries. As such they are regularly incorporated into sales contracts worldwide.

"Incoterms" is a registered trademark of the ICC.

CISG art. 66 is a supplement to an inadequate Incoterms rule.

The first work published by the ICC on international trade terms was issued in 1923, with the first edition known as Incoterms published in 1936. The Incoterms rules were amended in 1953, 1967, 1976, 1980, 1990, 2000, and 2010, with the ninth version — Incoterms 2020 — having been published on September 10, 2019.

== Incoterms 2020 ==
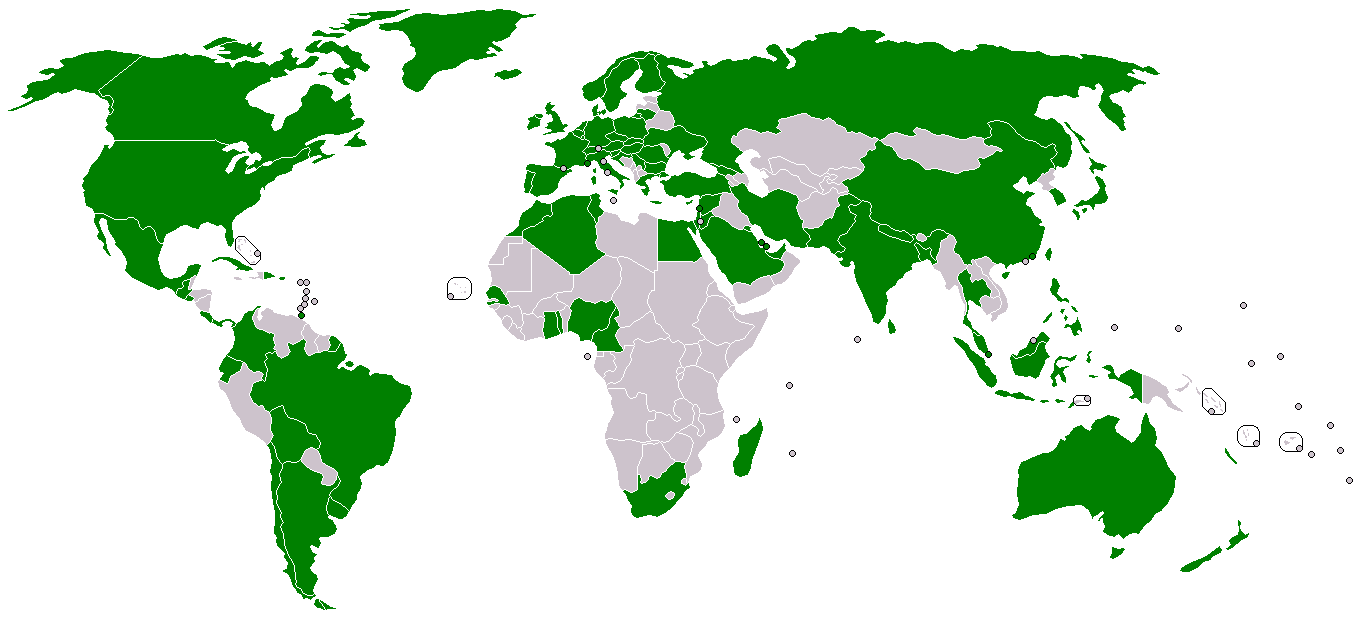
National Incoterms chambers

Incoterms 2020 is the ninth set of international contract terms published by the International Chamber of Commerce, with the first set having been published in 1936. Incoterms 2020 defines 11 rules, the same number as defined by Incoterms 2010. One rule of the 2010 version ("Delivered at Terminal"; DAT) was removed, and is replaced by a new rule ("Delivered at Place Unloaded"; DPU) in the 2020 rules.

The insurance to be provided under terms CIF and CIP has also changed, increasing from Institute Cargo Clauses(C) to Institute Cargo Clauses(A). Under the CIF Incoterms rule, which is reserved for use in maritime trade and is often used in commodity trading, the Institute Cargo Clauses (C) remains the default level of coverage, giving parties the option to agree to a higher level of insurance cover. Taking into account feedback from global users, the CIP Incoterms rule now requires a higher level of cover, compliant with the Institute Cargo Clauses (A) or similar clauses.

In prior versions, the rules were divided into four categories, but the 11 pre-defined terms of Incoterms 2020 are subdivided into two categories based only on method of delivery. The larger group of seven rules may be used regardless of the method of transport, with the smaller group of four being applicable only to sales that solely involve transportation by water where the condition of the goods can be verified at the point of loading on board ship. They are therefore not to be used for containerized freight, other combined transport methods, or for transport by road, air or rail.

Incoterms 2020 also formally defines delivery. Previously, the term had been defined informally but it is now defined as the point in the transaction where "the risk of loss or damage [to the goods] passes from the seller to the buyer".

== Incoterms in government regulations ==
In some jurisdictions, the duty costs of the goods may be calculated against a specific Incoterm: for example in India, duty is calculated against the CIF value of the goods, and in South Africa the duty is calculated against the FOB value of the goods. Because of this it is common for contracts for exports to these countries to use these Incoterms, even when they are not suitable for the chosen mode of transport. If this is the case then great care must be exercised to ensure that the points at which costs and risks pass are clarified with the customer.

== Defined terms in Incoterms ==
There are certain terms that have special meaning within Incoterms, and some of the more important ones are defined below:

- Delivery: The point in the transaction where the risk of loss or damage to the goods is transferred from the seller to the buyer
- Arrival: The point named in the Incoterm to which carriage has been paid
- Free Carrier: Seller has an obligation to deliver the goods to a named place for transfer to a carrier
- Carrier: Any person who, in a contract of carriage, undertakes to perform or to procure the performance of transport by rail, road, air, sea, inland waterway or by a combination of such modes
- Freight forwarder: A firm that makes or assists in the making of shipping arrangements;
- Terminal: Any place, whether covered or not, such as a dock, warehouse, container yard or road, rail or air cargo terminal
- To clear for export: To file Shipper’s Export Declaration and get export permit

== Variation of Incoterms ==
Parties adopting Incoterms should be wary about their intention and variations. The desire of the parties should be expressed clearly and casual adoption should be refrained. Also, making additions or variations to the meaning of a certain term should be carefully done as parties' failure to use any trade term at all can produce unexpected results.

== Rules for any mode of transport ==
=== EXW – Ex Works (named place of delivery) ===
The seller makes the goods available at their premises, or at another named place. This term places the maximum obligation on the buyer and minimum obligations on the seller. The Ex Works term is often used while making an initial quotation for the sale of goods without any costs included.

EXW means that a buyer incurs the risks of bringing the goods to their final destination. Either the seller does not load the goods on collecting vehicles and does not clear them for export, or if the seller does load the goods, they do so at buyer's risk and cost. If the parties agree that the seller should be responsible for the loading of the goods on departure and to bear the risk and all costs of such loading, this must be made clear by adding explicit wording to this effect in the contract of sale.

There is no obligation for the seller to make a contract of carriage, but there is also no obligation for the buyer to arrange one either - the buyer may sell the goods on to their own customer for collection from the original seller's warehouse. However, in common practice the buyer arranges the collection of the freight from the designated location, and is responsible for clearing the goods through Customs. The buyer is also responsible for completing all the export documentation, although the seller does have an obligation to obtain information and documents at the buyer's request and cost.

These documentary requirements may result in two principal issues. Firstly, the stipulation for the buyer to complete the export declaration can be an issue in certain jurisdictions (not least the European Union) where the customs regulations require the declarant to be either an individual or corporation resident within the jurisdiction. If the buyer is based outside of the customs jurisdiction, they will be unable to clear the goods for export, meaning that the goods may be declared in the name of the seller by the buyer, even though the export formalities are the buyer's responsibility under the EXW term.

Secondly, most jurisdictions require companies to provide proof of export for tax purposes. In an EXW shipment, the buyer is under no obligation to provide such proof to the seller, or indeed to even export the goods. In a customs jurisdiction such as the European Union, this would leave the seller liable to a sales tax bill as if the goods were sold to a domestic customer. It is therefore of utmost importance that these matters are discussed with the buyer before the contract is agreed. It may well be that another Incoterm, such as FCA seller's premises, may be more suitable, since this puts the onus for declaring the goods for export onto the seller, which provides for more control over the export process.

=== FCA – Free Carrier (named place of delivery) ===
The seller delivers the goods, cleared for export, at a named place (possibly including the seller's own premises). The goods can be delivered to a carrier nominated by the buyer, or to another party nominated by the buyer.

In many respects this Incoterm has replaced FOB in modern usage, although the critical point at which the risk passes moves from loading aboard the vessel to the named place. The chosen place of delivery affects the obligations of loading and unloading the goods at that place.

If delivery occurs at the seller's premises, or at any other location that is under the seller's control, the seller is responsible for loading the goods on to the buyer's carrier. However, if delivery occurs at any other place, the seller is deemed to have delivered the goods once their transport has arrived at the named place; the buyer is responsible for both unloading the goods and loading them onto self own carrier.

=== CPT – Carriage Paid To (named place of destination) ===
CPT replaces the C&F (cost and freight) and CFR terms for all shipping modes outside of non-containerized sea freight.

The seller pays for the carriage of the goods up to the named place of destination. However, the goods are considered to be delivered when the goods have been handed over to the first or main carrier, so that the risk transfers to buyer upon handing goods over to that carrier at the place of shipment in the country of Export.

The seller is responsible for origin costs including export clearance and freight costs for carriage to the named place of destination (either the final destination such as the buyer's facilities or a port of destination. This has to be agreed to by seller and buyer, however).

If the buyer requires the seller to obtain insurance, the Incoterm CIP should be considered instead.

=== CIP – Carriage and Insurance Paid to (named place of destination) ===
This term is broadly similar to the above CPT term, with the exception that the seller is required to obtain insurance for the goods while in transit. CIP requires the seller to insure the goods for 110% of the contract value under Institute Cargo Clauses (A) of the Institute of London Underwriters (which is a change from Incoterms 2010 where the minimum was Institute Cargo Clauses (C)), or any similar set of clauses, unless specifically agreed by both parties. The policy should be in the same currency as the contract, and should allow the buyer, the seller, and anyone else with an insurable interest in the goods to be able to make a claim.

CIP can be used for all modes of transport, whereas the Incoterm CIF should only be used for non-containerized sea-freight.

=== DPU – Delivered At Place Unloaded (named place of destination) ===
This Incoterm requires that the seller delivers the goods, unloaded, at the named place of destination. The seller covers all the costs of transport (export fees, carriage, unloading from main carrier at destination port and destination port charges) and assumes all risk until arrival at the destination port or terminal.

The terminal can be a port, airport, or inland freight interchange, but must be a facility with the capability to receive the shipment. If the seller is not able to organize unloading, they should consider shipping under DAP terms instead. All charges after unloading (for example, import duty, taxes, customs and on-carriage) are to be borne by buyer. However, any delay or demurrage charges at the terminal will generally be for the seller's account.

Some uncertainty has emerged since Incoterms 2020 were adopted as to the meaning of "unloaded" when goods are delivered in a container, usually by sea, as the removal of the container from the incoming vessel may suggest that it has been "unloaded", but the goods themselves are not yet "unloaded" while they remain in the container.

=== DAP – Delivered At Place (named place of destination) ===
Incoterms 2010 defines DAP as 'Delivered at Place' – the seller delivers when the goods are placed at the disposal of the buyer on the arriving means of transport ready for unloading at the named place of destination. Under DAP terms, the risk passes from seller to buyer from the point of destination mentioned in the contract of delivery.

Once goods are ready for shipment, the necessary packing is carried out by the seller at their own cost, so that the goods reach their final destination safely. All necessary legal formalities in the exporting country are completed by the seller at their own cost and risk to clear the goods for export.

After arrival of the goods in the country of destination, the customs clearance in the importing country needs to be completed by the buyer, e.g. import permit, documents required by customs, etc., including all customs duties and taxes.

Under DAP terms, all carriage expenses with any terminal expenses are paid by seller up to the agreed destination point. The necessary unloading cost at final destination has to be borne by buyer under DAP terms.

=== DDP – Delivered Duty Paid (named place of destination) ===
Seller is responsible for delivering the goods to the named place in the country of the buyer, and pays all costs in bringing the goods to the destination including import duties and taxes. The seller is not responsible for unloading. This term is often used in place of the non-Incoterm "Free In Store (FIS)". This term places the maximum obligations on the seller and minimum obligations on the buyer. No risk or responsibility is transferred to the buyer until delivery of the goods at the named place of destination.

The most important consideration for DDP terms is that the seller is responsible for clearing the goods through customs in the buyer's country, including both paying the duties and taxes, and obtaining the necessary authorizations and registrations from the authorities in that country. Unless the rules and regulations in the buyer's country are very well understood, DDP terms can be a very big risk both in terms of delays and in unforeseen extra costs, and should be used with caution.

== Rules for sea and inland waterway transport ==
To determine if a location qualifies for these four rules, please refer to 'United Nations Code for Trade and Transport Locations (UN/LOCODE)'.

The four rules defined by Incoterms 2020 for international trade where transportation is entirely conducted by water are as per the below. These terms are generally not suitable for shipments in shipping containers; the point at which risk and responsibility for the goods passes is when the goods are loaded on board the ship, and if the goods are sealed into a shipping container it is impossible to verify the condition of the goods at this point.

Also of note is that the point at which risk passes under these terms has shifted from previous editions of Incoterms, where the risk passed at the ship's rail.

=== FAS – Free Alongside Ship (named port of shipment) ===
The seller delivers when the goods are placed alongside the buyer's vessel at the named port of shipment. This means that the buyer has to bear all costs and risks of loss of or damage to the goods from that moment. The FAS term requires the seller to clear the goods for export, which is a reversal from previous Incoterms versions that required the buyer to arrange for export clearance. However, if the parties wish the buyer to clear the goods for export, this should be made clear by adding explicit wording to this effect in the contract of sale. This term should be used only for non-containerized sea freight and inland waterway transport.

=== FOB – Free on Board (named port of shipment) ===
Under FOB terms the seller bears all costs and risks up to the point the goods are loaded on board the vessel. The seller's responsibility does not end at that point unless the goods are "appropriated to the contract" that is, they are "clearly set aside or otherwise identified as the contract goods". Therefore, FOB contract requires a seller to deliver goods on board a vessel that is to be designated by the buyer in a manner customary at the particular port. In this case, the seller must also arrange for export clearance. On the other hand, the buyer pays cost of marine freight transportation, bill of lading fees, insurance, unloading and transportation cost from the arrival port to destination. Since Incoterms 1980 introduced the Incoterm FCA, FOB should only be used for non-containerized seafreight and inland waterway transport. However, FOB is commonly used incorrectly for all modes of transport despite the contractual risks that this can introduce. In some common law countries such as the United States of America, FOB is not only connected with the carriage of goods by sea but also used for inland carriage aboard any "vessel, car or other vehicle."

=== CFR – Cost and Freight (named port of destination) ===
The seller pays for the carriage of the goods up to the named port of destination. Risk transfers to buyer when the goods have been loaded on board the ship in the country of Export. The seller is responsible for origin costs including export clearance and freight costs for carriage to the named port. The shipper is not responsible for delivery to the final destination from the port (generally the buyer's facilities), or for buying insurance. If the buyer requires the seller to obtain insurance, the Incoterm CIF should be considered. CFR should only be used for non-containerized seafreight and inland waterway transport; for all other modes of transport it should be replaced with CPT.

=== CIF – Cost, Insurance & Freight (named port of destination) ===
==== Use preceding Incoterms ====
The term "cost, insurance, freight" or "c.i.f." predates the introduction of Incoterms. Craighall noted in a 1919 article that in "earlier times" the initials were usually written "C. F. & I.": he quotes the phrase "C. F. & I. by steamer to N.Y." used in a shipping contract addressed in the New York State case of Mee v. McNider (1886).

The first English court case which referred to c.i.f. was Tregelles v. Sewell (1862), where the court established that under c.i.f. terms, risk passes to the buyer on shipment. In the case of E. Clemens Horst Co. v. Biddell Brothers, the UK House of Lords ruled in 1911 that "the sellers in a c.i.f. contract were entitled to payment of the price upon tender of the bill of lading and insurance policy. The purchasers' intent to wait for satisfactory delivery and inspection was overruled. Shortly afterwards in 1915-16, the case of Arnhold Karberg & Co. v. Blythe, Green, Jourdain & Co. in the High Court and Court of Appeal showcased judicial debate about whether a c.i.f. bill of lading could evidence a sale of goods, Scrutton J ruling in the High Court that it did not, because a c.i.f. sale is "not a sale of goods, but a sale of documents relating to goods". The Court of Appeal upheld his decision, although Bankes LJ and Warrington LJ argued that "a c.i.f. contract is a contract for the sale of goods to be performed by the delivery of the documents". In a Ninth Circuit Court of Appeals case referencing the Arnhold Karberg case and also Manbre Saccharine v Corn Products (1919), it was explained that "under a c. i. f. contract the obligation of the seller is to deliver documents rather than goods, to transfer symbols rather than physical property". In the Manbre Saccharine case the seller was unable to enforce the c.i.f. contract where the goods had been lost at sea, but McCardie J emphasised that this was because no insurance policy was tendered, only a letter confirming insurance, and also because the goods did not match the contracted description: had these matters been otherwise, the contract would have been enforced.

==== Incoterms usage ====
As an Incoterm, CIF is broadly similar to the term CFR, with the exception that the seller is required to obtain insurance for the goods while in transit. CIF requires the seller to insure the goods for 110% of the contract value under Institute Cargo Clauses (A) of the Institute of London Underwriters (which is a change from Incoterms 2010 where the minimum was Institute Cargo Clauses (C)), or any similar set of clauses, unless specifically agreed by both parties. The policy should be in the same currency as the contract. The seller must also turn over documents necessary, to obtain the goods from the carrier or to assert claim against an insurer to the buyer. The documents include (as a minimum) the invoice, the insurance policy, and the bill of lading. These three documents represent the cost, insurance, and freight of CIF. The seller's obligation ends when the documents are handed over to the buyer. Then, the buyer has to pay at the agreed price. Another point to consider is that CIF should only be used for non-containerized sea freight; for all other modes of transport it should be replaced with CIP.

== Allocations of costs to buyer/seller according to Incoterms 2020 ==
Incoterm	Loading at origin	Export customs declaration	Carriage to port of export	Unloading of truck in port of export	Loading on vessel/airplane in port of export	Carriage (sea/air) to port of import	Insurance	Unloading in port of import	Loading on truck in port of import	Carriage to place of destination	Import customs clearance	Import duties and taxes	Unloading at destination
EXW	Buyer	Buyer	Buyer	Buyer	Buyer	Buyer	Buyer	Buyer	Buyer	Buyer	Buyer	Buyer	Buyer
FCA	Seller	Seller	Buyer/Seller	Buyer	Buyer	Buyer	Buyer	Buyer	Buyer	Buyer	Buyer	Buyer	Buyer
FAS	Seller	Seller	Seller	Seller	Buyer	Buyer	Buyer	Buyer	Buyer	Buyer	Buyer	Buyer	Buyer
FOB	Seller	Seller	Seller	Seller	Seller	Buyer	Buyer	Buyer	Buyer	Buyer	Buyer	Buyer	Buyer
CPT	Seller	Seller	Seller	Seller	Seller	Seller	Buyer	Buyer/Seller	Buyer/Seller	Buyer	Buyer	Buyer	Buyer
CIP	Seller	Seller	Seller	Seller	Seller	Seller	Seller	Buyer/Seller	Buyer/Seller	Buyer	Buyer	Buyer	Buyer
CFR	Seller	Seller	Seller	Seller	Seller	Seller	Buyer	Buyer	Buyer	Buyer	Buyer	Buyer	Buyer
CIF	Seller	Seller	Seller	Seller	Seller	Seller	Seller	Buyer	Buyer	Buyer	Buyer	Buyer	Buyer
DAP	Seller	Seller	Seller	Seller	Seller	Seller	Seller	Seller	Seller	Seller	Buyer	Buyer	Buyer
DPU	Seller	Seller	Seller	Seller	Seller	Seller	Seller	Seller	Seller	Seller	Buyer	Buyer	Seller
DDP	Seller	Seller	Seller	Seller	Seller	Seller	Seller	Seller	Seller	Seller	Seller	Seller	Buyer

With all Incoterms beginning with D there is no obligation to provide insurance, however the insurable risk is for the seller's account.

== Allocations of risks to buyer/seller according to Incoterms 2020 ==
The risk and the cost is not always the same for Incoterms. In many cases, the risk and cost usually goes together but it is not always the case. The below represents the transfer of risk.

Rules for sea and inland waterway transport

Incoterm 2020	Seller	Carrier	Port	Loading at Port	Onboard	Unloading at Port	Port
FAS	Seller	Seller	Seller	Buyer	Buyer	Buyer	Buyer
FOB	Seller	Seller	Seller	Seller	Buyer	Buyer	Buyer
CFR	Seller	Seller	Seller	Seller	Buyer	Buyer	Buyer
CIF	Seller	Seller	Seller	Seller	Buyer	Buyer	Buyer

Rules for any mode of transport

Incoterm 2020	Seller	Carrier	Port	Ship	Port	Terminal	Named place	Unloading at destination
EXW	Seller	Buyer	Buyer	Buyer	Buyer	Buyer	Buyer	Buyer
FCA	Seller	Seller	Buyer	Buyer	Buyer	Buyer	Buyer	Buyer
CPT	Seller	Buyer	Buyer	Buyer	Buyer	Buyer	Buyer	Buyer
CIP	Seller	Buyer	Insurance	Insurance	Insurance	Insurance	Insurance	Buyer
DAP	Seller	Seller	Seller	Seller	Seller	Seller	Seller	Buyer
DPU	Seller	Seller	Seller	Seller	Seller	Seller	Seller	Seller
DDP	Seller	Seller	Seller	Seller	Seller	Seller	Seller	Buyer

== Previous Incoterms ==
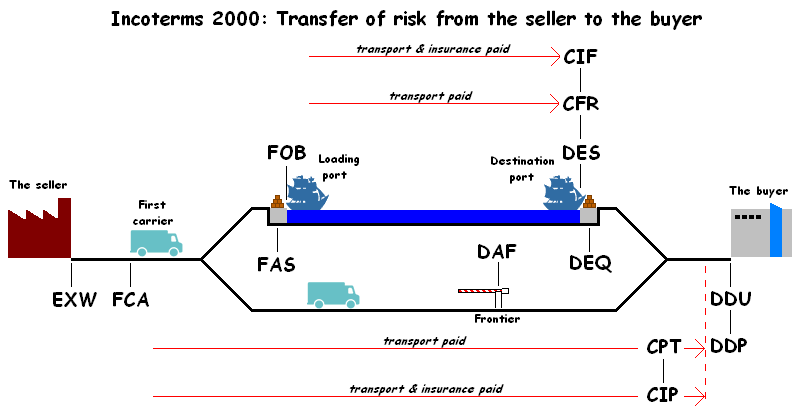
Incoterms - Transfer of risk from the seller to the buyer (diagram created in 2011)

While these terms do not feature in the current version of Incoterms it is possible that they may be seen in sales order contracts. Care must be taken to ensure that both parties agree on their obligations in this case.

=== DAF – Delivered at Frontier (named place of delivery) ===
This term can be used when the goods are transported by rail and road. The seller pays for transportation to the named place of delivery at the frontier. The buyer arranges for customs clearance and pays for transportation from the frontier to their factory. The passing of risk occurs at the frontier.

=== DAT – Delivered at Terminal ===
This term means that the seller delivers the goods to the buyer to the named terminal in the contract of sale, unloaded from the main carriage vehicle. The seller is responsible for making a safe delivery of goods to the named terminal, paying all transportation and export and transit customs clearance expenses. The seller bears the risks and costs associated with supplying the goods to the delivery terminal and unloading them, where the buyer becomes responsible for paying the duty and taxes, as well as any further carriage to a destination.

=== DES – Delivered Ex Ship ===
Where goods are delivered ex ship, the passing of risk does not occur until the ship has arrived at the named port of destination and the goods made available for unloading to the buyer. The seller pays the same freight and insurance costs as they would under a CIF arrangement. Unlike CFR and CIF terms, the seller has agreed to bear not just cost, but also Risk and Title up to the arrival of the vessel at the named port. Costs for unloading the goods and any duties, taxes, etc. are for the Buyer. Until 2011, DES was a commonly used term in shipping bulk commodities, such as coal, grain, dry chemicals; and where the seller either owned or had chartered their own vessel.

=== DEQ – Delivered Ex Quay (named port of delivery) ===
This is similar to DES, but the passing of risk does not occur until the goods have been unloaded at the port of discharge.

=== DDU – Delivered Duty Unpaid (named place of destination) ===
This term means that the seller delivers the goods to the buyer to the named place of destination in the contract of sale. A transaction in international trade where the seller is responsible for making a safe delivery of goods to a named destination, paying all transportation and export and transit customs clearance expenses. The seller bears the risks and costs associated with supplying the goods to the delivery location, where the buyer becomes responsible for paying the duty and taxes.

=== FOR - Free on rail and FOT - Free on truck ===
These two terms were both included in Incoterms 1953, in each case specifying a named departure point.

Use of Incoterms in Latin American International Trade

In Latin America, Incoterms play a crucial role in facilitating international business by clarifying the responsibilities of buyers and sellers in global transactions. Companies in countries such as Ecuador, Colombia, and Peru use Incoterms to standardize logistics operations, reduce misunderstandings, and ensure compliance with international regulations. The most commonly applied terms in the region are FOB (Free on Board), CIF (Cost, Insurance and Freight), and DAP (Delivered at Place), especially in the export of agricultural and manufactured products.

Ecuadorian exporters of bananas, flowers, and shrimp often rely on FOB terms when shipping to European or North American markets, as this allows them to maintain control until the goods are loaded onto the vessel. On the other hand, importers prefer CIF, which simplifies costs by including insurance and freight in a single price.

Training on Incoterms has also increased in business schools and chambers of commerce across the region. These organizations promote the latest version, Incoterms 2020, published by the International Chamber of Commerce (ICC), which introduced clarifications on cost allocation and security obligations. The use of standardized trade terms contributes to transparency, minimizes disputes, and strengthens regional competitiveness in the global marketplace.

== See also ==
- Commercial law
- Customs declaration
- International trade
- International trade law
- Uniform Commercial Code
- United Nations Convention on Contracts for the International Sale of Goods
