= Praeter legem =

Legal phrase: "outside of the law"

In Legal Latin, the phrase praeter legem ("outside of the law") "refers to an item that is not regulated by law and therefore is not illegal". It is thus distinct from the phrase contra legem, which refers to something that is directly against the law and therefore illegal or in conflict with statutes or other written regulation without being illegal or invalid, and it may also be compared to intra legem, "within the law" (legal).

Items that are generally called praeter legem include certain customs.
