= List of Master of Laws programs =

This is a list of Master of Laws programs by country.

== Africa ==
=== Mauritius ===
==== International Business Law ====
- Panthéon-Assas University in Medine Education Village.

=== South Africa ===
- Nelson Mandela University
- Stellenbosch University
- University of Cape Town
- University of Fort Hare
- University of KwaZulu-Natal
- University of Pretoria
- University of South Africa
- University of the Free State
- University of Western Cape
- University of Witwatersrand

== Asia ==
=== China ===
- China University of Political Science and Law (LL.M. program taught in English)
- China-EU School of Law (International Master of Chinese Law, Master of European and International Law, Master of Chinese Law, Double Masters)

=== Hong Kong ===
==== Human rights ====
- Faculty of Law, The University of Hong Kong

=== India ===
- Nalsar University of Law (Various specializations)

=== Japan ===
- Chuo University
- Doshisha University
- Kyushu University
- Keio University
- Nagoya University
- Niigata University
- University of Tokyo
- Waseda University

=== Singapore ===
==== International Business Law ====
- Panthéon-Assas University in Insead Campus.

=== Taiwan ===
- National Taiwan University
- National Chengchi University

== Europe ==
=== Austria ===
==== Anglo-American Business Law ====
- University for Continuing Education Krems

==== Business Law ====
- Vienna University of Economics and Business

==== Contract Law & Management ====
- University for Continuing Education Krems

==== Criminal Law, Business Law & Criminology ====
- University for Continuing Education Krems

==== European Business Law ====
- Vienna University of Economics and Business

==== European and International Business Law ====
- University of Vienna School of Law

==== European Studies ====
- University for Continuing Education Krems

==== Human Rights ====
- University of Vienna School of Law
- University for Continuing Education Krems

==== Insurance Law ====
- University for Continuing Education Krems

==== International Dispute Resolution ====
- University for Continuing Education Krems

==== International Legal Studies ====
- University of Vienna School of Law

==== International Tax Law ====
- Vienna University of Economics and Business

==== Legal Studies ====
- Vienna University of Economics and Business
- University for Continuing Education Krems

=== Belgium ===
==== Competition and Intellectual Property Law ====
- Faculty of Law, Political Science and Criminology of the University of Liège

=== Netherlands ===
==== Air and Space Law ====
- Leiden University

==== Commercial Law ====
- Rotterdam University

==== Commercial legal practice ====
- Amsterdam University

==== Constitutional and Public Administration Law ====
- Amsterdam University

==== Criminal Law and Criminology ====
- Groningen University
- Amsterdam University
- Free University Amsterdam
- Tilburg University
- Maastricht University

==== Dutch Law ====
- Tilburg University - 6 specialisation programmes and 1 open programme
- Leiden University - 7 specialisation programmes
- Free University Amsterdam - 9 specialisation programmes
- Maastricht University - 6 specialisation programmes
- Nijmegen University - 5 specialisation programmes
- Utrecht University - 4 specialisation programmes

==== Environmental Law ====
- Tilburg University
- Amsterdam University

==== European Law ====
- Amsterdam University
- Europa-Institut of Saarland University
- Groningen University
- Leiden University
- Maastricht University
- Nijmegen University
- Utrecht University

==== European and International Business Law ====
- Leiden University

==== Advanced Studies in European and International Human Rights Law ====
- Leiden University

==== European and international taxation ====
- Tilburg University
- Amsterdam University

==== Advanced Studies in European Tax Law ====
- Leiden University

==== European Union Business Law ====
- Amsterdam University

==== European Private Law ====
- Amsterdam University

==== Globalisation and Law ====
- Maastricht University

==== Health Law ====
- Amsterdam University

==== Information Law ====
- Amsterdam University

==== International Law ====
- Maastricht University

==== International Business Law ====
- Tilburg University
- Free University Amsterdam

==== International Criminal Law ====
- Amsterdam University

==== International and European Labour Law ====
- Tilburg University

==== International and European Public Law ====
- Rotterdam University
- Tilburg University
- Amsterdam University
- Free University Amsterdam
- Nijmegen University
- Utrecht University

==== International Economics and Business Law ====
- Groningen University

==== International Law and the Law of International Organisations ====
- Groningen University

==== International Law and Comparative Private Law ====
- Groningen University

==== International Law of Human Rights and Criminal Justice ====
- Utrecht University

==== International Trade and Investment Law ====
- Amsterdam University

==== IT, Internet and Law ====
- Free University Amsterdam
- Groningen University

==== Justice and Safety & Security ====
- Rotterdam University

==== Labour law ====
- Amsterdam University
- Maastricht University

==== Law and Management ====
- Tilburg University

==== Law and Economics ====
- Utrecht University

==== Law and Technology ====
- Tilburg University

==== Military Law ====
- Amsterdam University

==== Notary Law ====
- Leiden University
- Amsterdam University
- Free University Amsterdam
- Nijmegen University
- Utrecht University

==== Social law and social politics ====
- Tilburg University

==== (Dutch) Tax law ====
- Tilburg University
- Leiden University
- Amsterdam University
- Maastricht University - 2 specialisation programmes
- Nijmegen University
- Utrecht University

=== France ===
==== International Business Law ====
- Panthéon-Assas University

=== Germany ===
==== Business Law and Economic Law ====
- Martin Luther University of Halle-Wittenberg

==== European and International Law ====
- University of Hamburg & China-EU School of Law

==== Global Licensing ====
- Darmstadt University of Applied Sciences

==== Health Law ====
- Düsseldorf Law School

==== Human Rights ====
- Viadrina European University, Frankfurt (Oder)

==== Information and Technology ====
- Düsseldorf Law School

==== Intellectual Property ====
- Düsseldorf Law School

==== Law and Business ====
- Bucerius Law School

==== LLM Finance ====
- Institute for Law and Finance

=== Italy ===
==== International Law ====
- University of Turin, Faculty of Law
- International University College of Turin

==== Sustainable Development ====
- University of Milan, Faculty of Law

=== Portugal ===
==== International Business Law ====
- Católica Global School of Law, Lisbon

==== Law in a European and Global Context ====
- Católica Global School of Law, Lisbon

=== Spain ===
==== Intellectual Property Law ====
- Universitat Pompeu Fabra
- Universidad Autonoma de Madrid

=== Switzerland ===
- University of Fribourg (Master of Laws in Cross-Cultural Business Practice - MLCBP)

==== International Law ====
- Graduate Institute of International and Development Studies
- Geneva Academy of International Humanitarian Law and Human Rights

=== UK ===
==== England ====
===== Financial =====
- London School of Economics and Political Science
- King’s College London
- University College London
- Westminster University

==== Scotland ====
===== Financial =====
- University of Glasgow

===== IT/Internet =====
- University of Strathclyde

==== Wales ====
===== Various =====
- Swansea University

== North America ==
=== Canada ===
==== Air and Space Law ====
- McGill University Faculty of Law

==== Bioethics ====
- McGill University Faculty of Law

==== Common Law ====
- University of British Columbia Faculty of Law

==== Comparative Law ====
- McGill University Faculty of Law

==== Environmental Law ====
- McGill University Faculty of Law

==== European Studies ====
- McGill University Faculty of Law

=== United States ===
==== Admiralty Law ====
- Tulane University Law School
- University of Miami School of Law
- The Charleston School of Law

==== Agriculture & Food Law ====
- University of Arkansas School of Law

==== American Law ====
- New England Law, Boston
- Northeastern University School of Law
- Saint Louis University School of Law
- Syracuse University College of Law
- Tulane University Law School
- University of California, Hastings College of the Law
- Washington University in St. Louis School of Law

==== American Business Law ====
- Tulane University Law School
- UC Berkeley School of Law
- University of Tennessee College of Law

==== Banking ====
- Boston University School of Law
- Fordham University School of Law

==== Bankruptcy Law ====
- UCLA School of Law
- St. John's University School of Law

==== Child Law ====
- Loyola University Chicago School of Law

==== Climate Change ====
- Elisabeth Haub School of Law at Pace University

==== Commerce & Technology ====
- University of New Hampshire School of Law

==== Comparative Law ====
- Louisiana State University Law Center
- Notre Dame Law School
- University of California, Hastings College of the Law
- University of Miami School of Law
- ONU Democratic Governance/Rule of Law LL.M. Program
- University of New Hampshire School of Law

==== Constitutional Law ====
- University of Pennsylvania Law School
- Washington College of Law

=== Corporate Law and Finance ===
- Wayne State University Law School

==== Corporate Law and Governance ====
- Cumberland School of Law
- Harvard Law School
- Loyola University Chicago School of Law
- New York University Law School
- Stanford University Law School
- UCLA Law School
- University of Pennsylvania Law School

==== Criminal Law ====
- University at Buffalo Law School
- University of New Hampshire School of Law

==== Dispute Resolution ====
- Benjamin N. Cardozo School of Law
- George Washington University Law School
- Pepperdine University School of Law
- Thomas Goode Jones School of Law
- University of California, Hastings College of the Law
- University of Missouri School of Law
- Washington University School of Law

==== Elder Law ====
- Seattle University School of Law
- Stetson University College of Law
- Western New England University School of Law

==== Employee Benefits ====
- University of Illinois Chicago School of Law

==== Energy and Environmental Law ====
- George Washington University Law School
- Tulane University Law School
- University of Houston Law Center
- Vermont Law and Graduate School

==== Entertainment and Media ====
- UCLA Law School
- Southwestern Law School

==== Entrepreneurial Law ====
- University of Colorado Law School

==== Environmental Law ====
- George Washington University Law School
- Golden Gate University
- Lewis & Clark Law School
- Elisabeth Haub School of Law at Pace University
- Sturm College of Law
- UC Berkeley School of Law
- University of Oregon
- University of Colorado Law School
- Vermont Law and Graduate School

==== Estate Planning ====
- Western New England College School of Law
- University of Miami School of Law

==== Family Law ====
- Maurice A. Deane School of Law
- University of California, Hastings College of the Law

==== Federal Criminal Practice and Procedure ====
- Mercer University School of Law

==== General Studies or U.S. Law (American Law for Foreign Attorneys) ====
- American University Washington College of Law
- Boston University School of Law
- Cornell Law School
- Columbia Law School
- Duke Law School
- George Washington University Law School
- Georgetown University Law Center
- Indiana University Robert H. McKinney School of Law
- Maurice A. Deane School of Law
- New York University Law School
- Northeastern University School of Law
- Northwestern University Law School
- Saint Louis University School of Law
- Santa Clara University School of Law
- St. John's University School of Law
- Southwestern Law School
- Stanford University Law School
- Thomas Jefferson School of Law
- Touro College Jacob D. Fuchsberg Law Center
- Tulane University Law School
- University of Arizona College of Law
- University of California, Berkeley School of Law
- University of California, Hastings College of the Law
- University of Chicago Law School
- University of Georgia School of Law
- University of Michigan Law School
- University of Minnesota Law School
- University of Pennsylvania Law School
- University of Southern California Law School
- University of Virginia School of Law
- Vermont Law School
- Washington University School of Law
- Yale Law School

==== Global Legal Studies ====
- University of Illinois Chicago School of Law
- Northeastern University School of Law

==== Government Procurement Law ====
- George Washington University Law School

==== Health Law and Global Health ====
- Albany Law School
- Georgetown University Law Center
- Indiana University Robert H. McKinney School of Law
- Loyola University Chicago School of Law
- Northeastern University School of Law
- Saint Louis University School of Law
- Southern Illinois University School of Law
- University of Washington School of Law

==== Human Rights ====
- Benjamin L. Crump College of Law
- Harvard Law School
- Indiana University Robert H. McKinney School of Law
- Northeastern University School of Law
- Northwestern University Law School
- Notre Dame Law School
- University of California, Hastings College of the Law

==== Indigenous Peoples Law and Policy ====
- James E. Rogers College of Law

==== Information Technology and Privacy Law ====
- University of Colorado Law School
- University of Illinois Chicago School of Law

==== Innovation and Technology Law ====
- Seattle University School of Law

==== Insurance ====
- University of Connecticut School of Law

==== Intellectual Property ====
- Benjamin N. Cardozo School of Law
- Boston University School of Law
- Fordham University School of Law
- George Mason University School of Law
- George Washington University Law School
- Indiana University Robert H. McKinney School of Law
- Michigan State University College of Law
- Santa Clara University School of Law
- Seton Hall University School of Law
- Thomas M. Cooley Law School
- University of Akron School of Law
- University of California, Hastings College of the Law
- University of Colorado Law School
- University of Houston Law Center
- University of Illinois Chicago School of Law
- University of New Hampshire School of Law
- University of Pennsylvania Law School
- University of Washington School of Law
- Washington University School of Law

==== International Business Law ====
- Northeastern University School of Law
- University of California College of the Law, San Francisco

==== International Business and Economics ====
- Georgetown University Law Center

==== International Business and Trade Law ====
- Northeastern University School of Law
- University of Illinois Chicago School of Law

==== International Commercial Law ====
- UC Davis School of Law

==== International and Comparative Law ====
- Cornell Law School
- Duke University School of Law
- George Washington University Law School
- Indiana University Robert H. McKinney School of Law
- Tulane University Law School
- Santa Clara University School of Law

==== International Criminal Law and Justice ====
- University of New Hampshire School of Law

==== International Development ====
- Claude W. Pettit College of Law
- Northeastern University School of Law
- University of Washington School of Law

==== International Law ====
- Albany Law School
- American University Washington College of Law
- Duke University School of Law
- Fordham University School of Law
- Fletcher School of Law and Diplomacy
- University of New Hampshire School of Law
- George Washington University Law School
- Georgetown University Law Center
- Indiana University Robert H. McKinney School of Law
- New York University School of Law
- Northeastern University School of Law
- Stetson University College of Law
- Temple University Beasley School of Law
- UC Berkeley School of Law
- University of California College of the Law, San Francisco
- UCLA School of Law
- University of Georgia School of Law
- University of Houston Law Center
- University of Miami School of Law
- Notre Dame Law School
- University of Pennsylvania Law School
- University of San Diego School of Law

==== International Tax & Finance Law ====
- Harvard Law School
- New York University Law School
- Thomas Jefferson School of Law
- University of Florida Levin College of Law

==== International Trade & Business Law ====
- University of Arizona College of Law

==== International Trade and Trade Regulation ====
- Fordham University School of Law
- New York University Law School
- University of California, Hastings College of the Law
- University of Pennsylvania Law School

==== Law & Economics ====
- George Mason University School of Law

=== Labor and Employment Law ===
- Wayne State University Law School

==== Military Law ====
- The Judge Advocate General's Legal Center and School

==== Natural Resources Law ====
- University of Colorado Law School
- University of Tulsa College of Law

==== Real Estate Law ====
- New York Law School
- Elisabeth Haub School of Law at Pace University
- University of Illinois Chicago School of Law
- University of Miami School of Law (Real Property Development)

==== Rule of Law/Democratic Governance ====
- Claude W. Pettit College of Law

==== Science and Technology ====
- Stanford University Law School
- University of California, Berkeley School of Law
- University of California, Hastings College of the Law
- Washington University School of Law

==== Securities and Finance ====
- Georgetown University Law Center
- George Washington University Law School
- Harvard Law School
- University of Pennsylvania Law School
- Chicago-Kent College of Law
- Boston University Law School
- New York Law School
- New York University School of Law
- St. John's University Law School

==== Tax Law ====
- Boston University School of Law
- Capital University Law School
- Chapman University School of Law
- Georgetown University Law Center
- George Washington University Law School
- Golden Gate University School of Law
- Harvard Law School
- University of Illinois Chicago School of Law
- Loyola Law School
- Loyola University Chicago School of Law
- New York Law School
- New York University Law School
- Northwestern University School of Law
- University of Baltimore School of Law
- University of Denver Graduate Tax
- University of Alabama School of Law
- University of California College of the Law, San Francisco
- University of Florida Levin College of Law
- University of Miami School of Law
- University of Missouri–Kansas City School of Law
- University of San Diego School of Law
- University of Washington School of Law
- Temple University Beasley School of Law
- Thomas M. Cooley Law School
- Wayne State University Law School
- Villanova University School of Law
- Washington University School of Law

==== Trial Advocacy ====
- American University Washington College of Law (degree in Advocacy)
- California Western School of Law (with a Specialization in Federal Criminal Law)
- Chapman University School of Law
- Stetson University College of Law
- Temple University Beasley School of Law

==== Tribal Law ====
- Seattle University School of Law
