= China-EU Institute for Clean and Renewable Energy =

Education and research institute in China

China-EU Institute for Clean and Renewable Energy at Huazhong University of Science & Technology (CE-ICARE or ICARE)
- 华中科技大学中欧清洁与可再生能源学院
- Established: March 2012
- Affiliations: Huazhong University of Science and Technology
- Dean: Professor HUANG ShuHong (HUST); Professor Michel FARINE (ParisTech)
- Location: Wuhan, Hubei, China
- Website: icare.hust.edu.cn

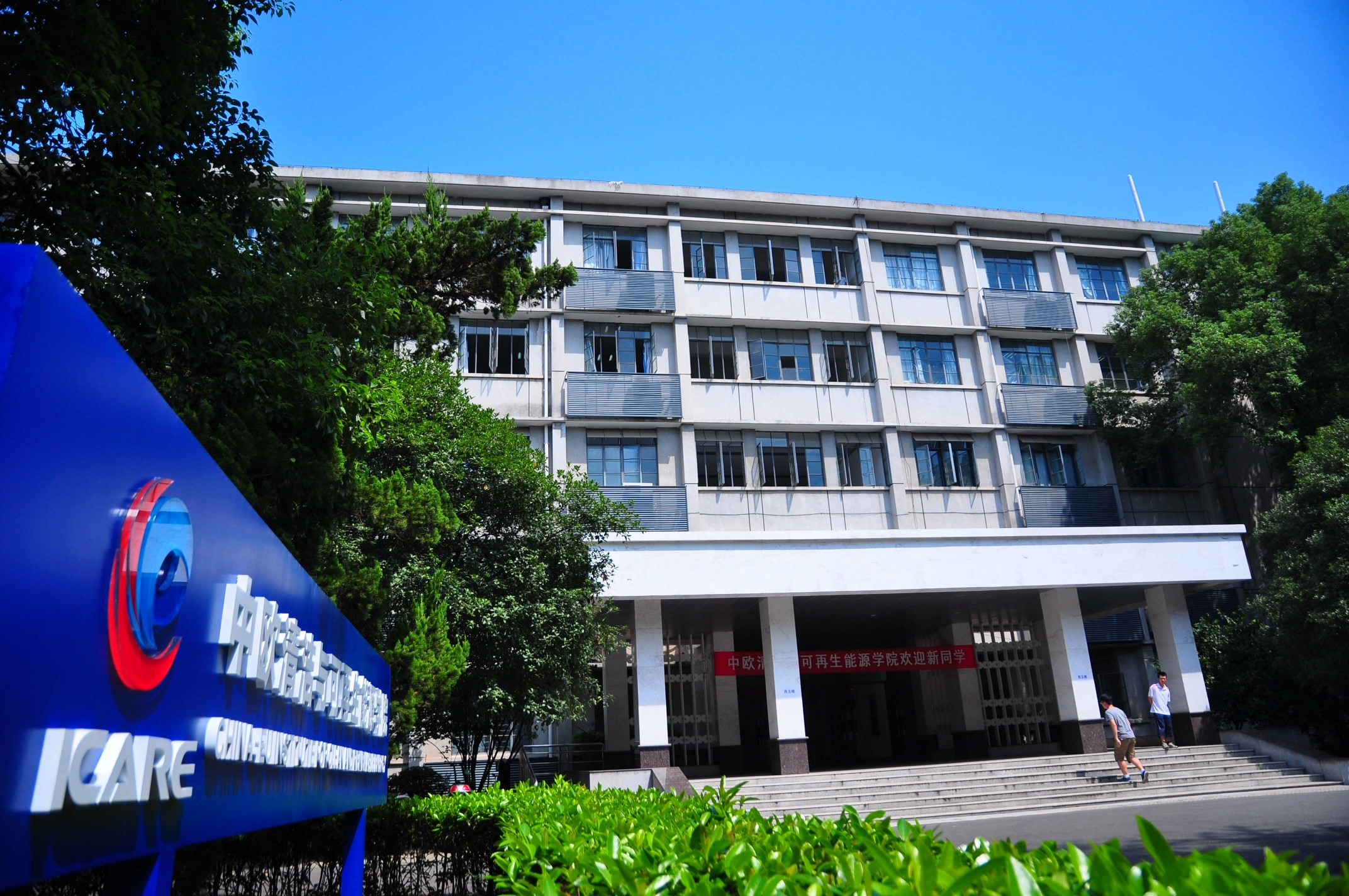
ICARE building in Huazhong University of S&T

The China-EU Institute for Clean and Renewable Energy at Huazhong University of Science & Technology (CE-ICARE; Chinese: 华中科技大学中欧清洁与可再生能源学院) is an education and research institute located in Wuhan, China, created in July 2010 and hosted in Huazhong University of Science and Technology. ICARE is the third Sino-European institute being created in China after the China-EU International Business School in Shanghai in 1994 (as China-EC Management Institute) and the China-EU School of Law in Beijing in 2008. ICARE project has a 5-year funding from EU and Chinese government.

The creation of ICARE follows an agreement signed in 2009 by European Commissioner for External Relations Benita Ferrero-Waldner and Chinese Minister for Foreign Trade GAO Hucheng in the frame of the collaboration between China and Europe for environmental protection and climate change mitigation.

ICARE mission is to support China in implementing activities in management and technology in order to reduce the consumption of fossil energy and carbon emissions through renewable energies and energy efficiency.

== ICARE ==
ICARE is providing education to university students as well as to Chinese professionals and as the strong will to become the reference institute on energy efficiency and renewable energy in China. ICARE relies on a partner consortium of higher-education institutions composed of 7 European members from 5 countries and 3 Chinese members.

- France
  - ParisTech (4 out of the 12 higher-engineering and business schools in ParisTech),
    - Mines ParisTech,
    - Ecole Polytechnique,
    - Chimie ParisTech,
    - ENSTA ParisTech.
  - University of Perpignan Via Domitia,
  - French International Office for Water (IOWater)
- Spain
  - Zaragoza University
- United Kingdom
  - Northumbria University
- Greece
  - National Technical University of Athens
- Italy
  - La Sapienza University
- China
  - Huazhong University of Science and Technology in Wuhan
  - Wuhan University of Technology in Wuhan
  - Southeast University in Nanjing

== Programmes offered ==
=== Master degree in Clean and Renewable Energy ===
It is a Double master's degree Programme, namely, the master programme of energy science and technology conferred by Huazhong University of Science and Technology (HUST) in China, and the master programme of clean and renewable energy granted by ParisTech (CARE), for students who already have a degree in engineering or in another relevant scientific discipline in areas where there is a strong need for additional qualified workforce in China. Courses are taught in English by European and Chinese teachers, all experts in their fields. Main subjects are Solar Energy, Wind Energy, Biomass, Geothermal, Hydrogen and Energy Storage and Energy Efficiency. There is a six-month training period in laboratories in China or in Europe which allows the students to put into practice skills and knowledge acquired during courses. Presently 160 students are following the Master courses. First class was graduated (Master from ParisTech and Master from HuaZhong University) on March 15, 2013.

=== Vocational training (VT) for energy professionals ===
To meet the needs of domestic and international companies for professional training of their staff (decision makers, engineers, etc.) on CRE, ICARE aims at developing a VT platform. Tailored professional programmes are developed by European partners or associated partners. First sessions were held during three days in January 2013 on Photovoltaic energy technologies.

== Research Platform ==
A Research Platform (RP) is developed to facilitate exchange of Ph.D. students between European and Chinese universities and co-supervision of research activities. RP is also a contact facilitator between European professors, during their teaching stays in ICARE, and Chinese professors to meet and develop common research projects. Every year top specialists in CREN fields are delivering conferences at ICARE.
