= Master of Laws =

Type of postgraduate qualification

A Master of Laws (M.L. or LL.M.; Latin: Magister Legum or Legum Magister) is a postgraduate academic degree, pursued by those either holding an undergraduate academic law degree or a professional law degree.

In many jurisdictions, the LL.M. is an advanced professional degree for those already admitted to legal practice.

== Definition ==
To become a lawyer and practice law in most jurisdictions, a person must first obtain a law degree. In most common law countries, a Bachelor of Laws (LL.B.) is required. In the United States, a bachelor's degree followed by the Juris Doctor (J.D.) (a graduate school degree), and passing an additional set of examinations (the bar exam) is typically required to practice law. (The second "L" in LL.M. indicates the Latin plural.)

The LL.M. program is an advanced postgraduate law program. In Canada, an LL.B is required to enter an LL.M program; in the United States and Australia, a J.D. is required. Specialized LL.M. programs have been introduced in many European countries. An LL.M. degree is typically a requirement for entry into research doctoral programs in law.

The most advanced degree programs in the law are the Doctor of Juridical Science (S.J.D. or J.S.D.), the Doctor of Philosophy (Ph.D. or DPhil) or doctorat en droit (in France), Doktor der Rechtswissenschaften (Dr. iur.) (in Germany), the Doctor of Laws (LL.D.), and the Doctor of Civil Law (D.C.L.).

== Types ==
Most universities offer only a small number of LL.M. programs, although there is great variety over all global jurisdictions.

In Europe, LL.M. programs in European law are popular, often referred to as LL.M. Eur (Master of European Law). In the Netherlands, the title used is Meester in de Rechten (mr.) as well as in Flanders (Belgium), by those who studied Dutch or Belgian law respectively.

Some LL.M. programs, particularly in the United States and China, focus on teaching foreign lawyers the basic legal principles of the host country.

The length of time to study for an LL.M. program depends on the mode of study. Most full-time on-campus courses take one academic year to complete. Other students may complete their LL.M. program on a part-time basis over multiple years, and courses are increasingly available online. Part-time online courses can take between two and five years to complete.

== Requirements ==
LL.M. programs are usually only open to those students who have first obtained a degree in law, typically an LL.B. or J.D. Very few programs allow exceptions to this. Full-time LL.M. programs vary in their graduation requirements but most require students to write a thesis. Some programs are somewhat research oriented with less classroom time, while others require students to take a set number of classes.

LL.M. degrees are often earned by students wishing to develop more concentrated expertise in a particular area of law. Pursuing an LL.M. degree may also allow law students to build a professional network by strengthening their connections among peers.

== Programs by country ==
=== Australia ===
In Australia, the LLM is generally only open to graduates with a first professional degree in law (typically a JD or LLB). There are nearly 100 LLM courses in Australia across 25 institutions taught in English.

Variants of the LL.M. exist, such as the Master of Legal Practice (M.L.P.) available at the Australian National University, where students who have completed the Graduate Diploma of Legal Practice (which law graduates must obtain before being able to be admitted as a solicitor/barrister), will be granted some credit towards the Master qualification. Other variants of the LL.M. are more similar to the LL.M. available in the wider Commonwealth but under a different title, for example Master of Commercial Law, Master of International Law or Master of Human Rights Law. These courses are usually more specialised than a standard LL.M.

=== Canada ===
In Canada, the LL.M. is generally open to law graduates holding a J.D., LL.B., LL.L., or B.C.L. as a first degree. Students can choose to take research-based LL.M. degrees or course-based LL.M. degrees. Research-based LL.M. degrees are one- or two-year programs that require students to write a thesis that makes a significant contribution to their field of research. Course-based LL.M. degrees do not require a significant research paper. An LL.M. can be studied part-time, and at some schools, through distance learning. LL.M. degrees can be general, or students can choose to pursue a specialized area of research.

Foreign trained lawyers who wish to practice in Canada will first need to have their education and experience assessed by the Federation of Law Societies of Canada's National Committee on Accreditation. Upon having received a certificate of accreditation from the National Committee on Accreditation, foreign law graduates would then have to obtain articles with a law firm, take the professional legal training course, and pass the professional exams to be called to the bar in a province. The University of British Columbia's LLM in Common Law is an example of one of a few LLM courses that help to prepare students for the professional exams.

=== China (Mainland) ===
The LL.M. is available at China University of Political Science and Law, and the entrance requirements are native English language competency or near native English, with any bachelor's degree. The program is flexible and allows students to study Mandarin and assists with organizing work experience in Beijing and other cities in China. It normally takes two years, but can be completed in one and a half years if students take the required credits in time.

The flagship of the China-EU School of Law (CESL) in Beijing is a Double Master Programme including a Master of Chinese Law and a Master of European and International Law. The Master of European and International Law is taught in English, open for international students and can be studied as a single master programme. The International Master of Chinese Law (IMCL) is an LL.M. in Chinese law taught entirely in English.

Beijing Foreign Studies University has launched an online LLM for international professionals. The course is taken over two years, with the first covering online lessons through video and assignments, the second year is for the dissertation and an online defense is required at the end. Students are required to attend in Beijing for an introductory week in September to enroll and meet students and staff. Students also have the opportunity to get work experience at a top five law firm in China.

LL.M degree programs are available at many other universities in Mainland China, such as at Peking University, Tsinghua University, Shanghai Jiaotong University, and Shanghai International Studies University.

=== Faroe Islands ===
The University of the Faroe Islands (Faroese: Fróðskaparsetur Føroya) in the Faroe Islands offers a graduate degree program in law. This degree is a variant of the LL.M., called Embætisprógv í lóg (Emb.L.) in Faroese and translated to English as Master of Legal Practise (MLP). The duration of the degree is two years, as a continuation of the Bachelor of Laws degree. Completion of the Emb.L. is one of the criteria for admission to practice law as an attorney in the Faroe Islands.

=== Finland ===
In Finland, an LL.M. is the standard degree required to practice law. No other qualifications are required.

=== France ===
In France, an LL.M. in International Business Law is available at Panthéon-Assas University (Paris), the oldest school of law in France. The LL.M. is taught in English. The program allows students to study French. Entrance requirements are:

- Very good English, with a master's degree in law (or equivalent); or
- Alternative diploma and four years' professional experience.

A further 11 institutions in France offer 20 other LLM programs taught in English, with specialties including European Law.

=== Germany ===
In Germany, the LL.M. is an advanced legal qualification of a supplementary nature. Some graduates choose to undertake their LL.M. directly following their "Erstes Juristisches Staatsexamen" (the "first state examination", which constitutes the first stage of the official German legal training), an alternative postgraduate course, or their "Zweites Juristisches Staatsexamen" (that is, the second and final stage of the official German legal training).

=== Hong Kong ===
LL.M. degree programmes are offered by the law faculties of The University of Hong Kong, The Chinese University of Hong Kong and the City University of Hong Kong. An LL.B. degree is usually required for admission, but for the LL.M. in Human Rights programme offered by HKU, an undergraduate degree in any related discipline is sufficient.

=== India ===
As in the United Kingdom, a master's degree in law in India provides specialization in a particular area of law. The most common areas of specialization are constitutional law, family law and taxation law.

With the establishment of the specialized autonomous law schools in India in 1987 (the first was the National Law School of India University) much emphasis is on attaining a master's level of legal education in India. Specialization has been shifting to newer areas such as corporate law, intellectual property law, and international trade law. LL.M programs in India were previously two years in duration but presently typically last one year. Some Indian universities offer a one-year LL.M. program with specializations in corporate law, constitutional law, and international business law, aimed at enhancing legal expertise for academic and professional growth.

=== Ireland ===
A number of universities and colleges in Ireland offer LL.M. programs, such as Dublin City University, Trinity College Dublin, University College Cork, National University of Ireland, Galway (NUIG), National University of Ireland, Maynooth (NUIM), the Law Society of Ireland in partnership with Northumbria University, and Griffith College.

University College Dublin also offers the Masters in Common Law (MCL, Magisterii in Jure Communi, M.Jur.Com), an advanced two-year programme for non-law graduates. The degree is a qualifying law degree for admittance to the entrance exams of the Honorable Society of King's Inns.

=== Italy ===
Italy offers masters programs in both Italian and in English, depending on the school. They are often called "laurea specialistica", corresponding with the second step of the Bologna plan (European curriculum), and in this case they last two years. For example, the University of Milan offers a 2 year LLM on Sustainable Development. In South Tyrol, programmes are also taught in German, as in Bolzano.

In Italy the term "master" often refers to a vocational degree, 6 or 12 months long, in specific areas, such as "law and internet security", or "law of administrative management". This type of program is often taught part-time to allow professionals already working in the field to improve their skills.

=== Mauritius ===
The LLM in International Business Law from Panthéon-Assas University is also available in Mauritius at the Medine Village campus.

=== Netherlands ===
To be allowed to practice law in the Netherlands, one needs an LL.M. degree with a specific set of courses in litigation law. The Dutch Order of Lawyers (NOVA) require these courses for every potential candidate lawyer who wants to be conditionally written in the district court for three years. After receiving all the diplomas prescribed by NOVA and under supervision of a "patron", a lawyer is eligible to have his own practice and is unconditionally written in a court for life.

=== Norway ===
The Norwegian legal degree master i rettsvitenskap (English: master in jurisprudence) is officially translated to English as Master of Laws (LL.M.), as it is more comprehensive than the basic graduate law degree in common law countries (such as a J.D.). The last year in the five-year professional Norwegian law degree program is thus considered to correspond to a LL.M specialization. In addition, universities with legal faculties at the masters level offer several LL.M programmes. For example, Universitetet i Oslo offers tuition-free LL.M courses in Public International Law, Maritime Law, Information and Communication Technology (ICT Law), as well as distinct specializations in human rights.

=== Pakistan ===
In Pakistan, the University of the Punjab, University of Karachi, Shaheed Zulfiqar Ali Bhutto University of Law, International Islamic University, Islamabad, Government College University, Faisalabad, University of Sargodha are LL.M. degree awarding institutions. Completing a LL.M. qualification in Pakistan consists of studying eight subjects in four semesters. This spans a period of two years and also requires the student to write a thesis on a proposed topic. A student has to pass each subject in order to qualify for the LL.M. degree, and the passing mark is set at 60%. The program is taught in English.

Universities in Pakistan teach comparative constitutional law, comparative human rights law and comparative jurisprudence as mandatory subjects. The programs also include research methodology and four elective subjects, which may include company law, taxation law, intellectual property law and banking law.

=== Portugal ===
The Master of Laws programmes offered in Portugal are extremely varied but do not, for the most part, use the designation LL.M., being more commonly called Mestrado em Direito (Master's Degree in Law), like the ones at Coimbra University's Faculty of Law and Lusíada University of Porto. Although the classical Mestrado em Direito takes two years to finish and involves a dissertation, there are some shorter variants. A few Mestrados with an international theme have specifically adopted the LL.M designation: the LL.M in European and Transglobal Business Law at the School of Law of the University of Minho and the LL.M. Law in a European and Global Context and the Advanced LL.M. in International Business Law, both at the Católica Global School of Law, in Lisbon.

=== Singapore ===
In Singapore, the LL.M. is in English. The LL.M. in International Business Law from Panthéon-Assas University is also available in Singapore at Insead campus.

=== South Africa ===
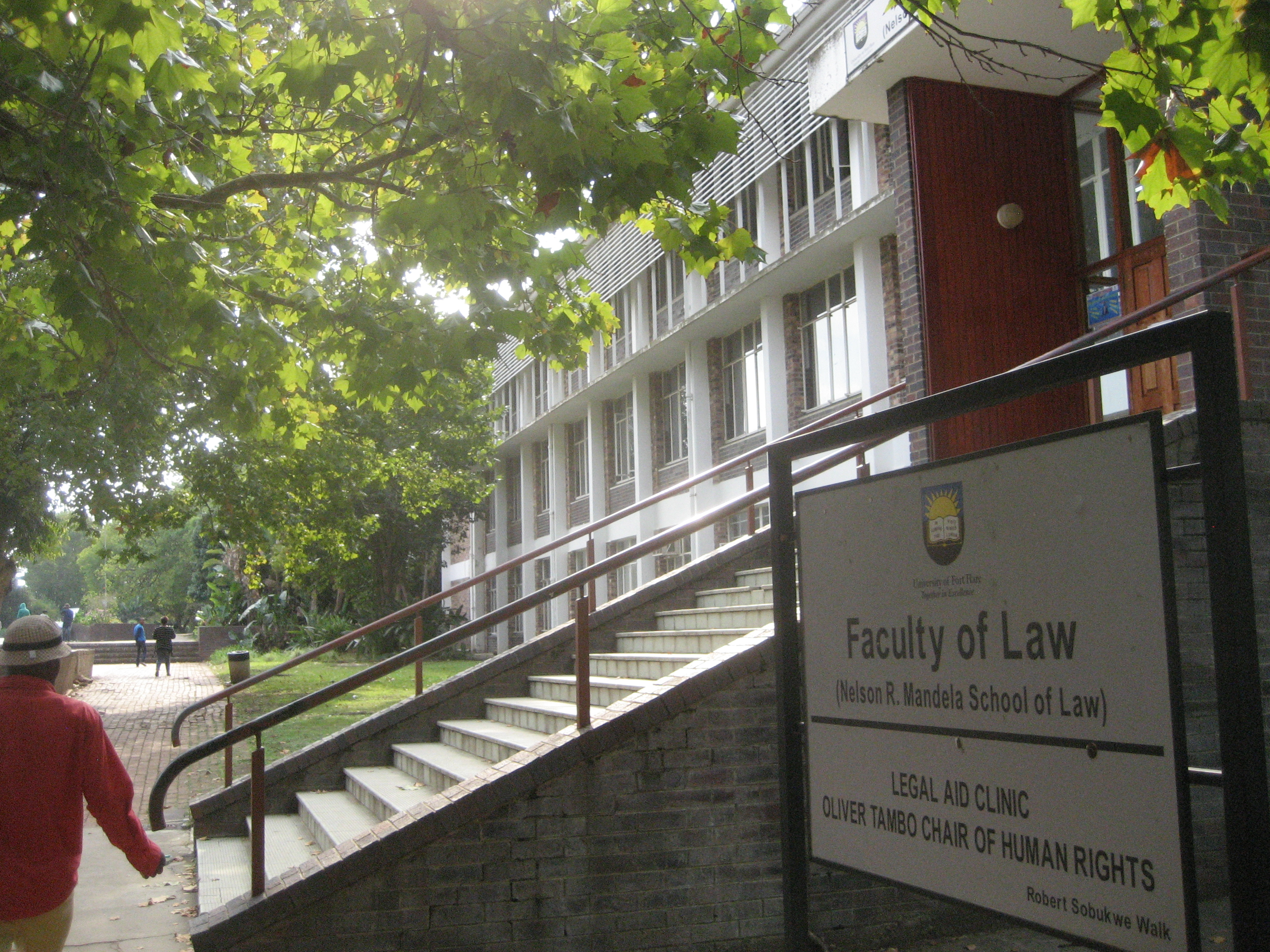
University of Fort Hare Faculty of Law

In South Africa, the LL.M. is a postgraduate degree offered both as a course-based and research-based master's degree. In the former case, the degree comprises advanced coursework in a specific area of law as well as limited related research, usually in the form of a short dissertation, while in the latter, the degree is entirely thesis based. The first type, typically, comprises "practice-oriented" topics (e.g. in tax, mining law), while the second type is theory-oriented, often preparing students for admission to LL.D. or Ph.D. programmes. Admission is generally limited to LL.B. graduates, although holders of other law degrees, such as the BProc, may be able to apply if admitted as attorneys and/or by completing supplementary LL.B. coursework.

=== Sweden ===
A masters degree (LL.M) is the standard graduate degree among law practitioners in Sweden. The masters programme takes four and a half years to complete. At most universities, the last one and a half years are spent on specialization at an advanced level (advanced level courses and a thesis). It is possible to get a degree after three years (LL.B), but the vast majority of legal practitioners in Sweden have an LL.M.

=== Taiwan ===
In Taiwan, law can be studied as a postgraduate degree resulting in an LL.M. Some LL.M. programs in Taiwan are offered to students with or without a legal background. However, the graduation requirements for students with a legal background are lower than for those students who do not have a legal background (to account for fundamental legal subjects that were taken during undergraduate studies). Students studying in an LL.M. program normally take three years to earn the necessary credits and finish a master's thesis.

=== United Kingdom ===
In the United Kingdom, an LL.M. programme is open to those holding a recognised legal qualification, generally an undergraduate degree in Laws such as the LL.B. or the B.A. in Law; the Graduate Diploma in Law - (GDL), or a recognized equivalent. They do not have to be or intend to be legal practitioners. An LL.M. is not required, nor is it a sufficient qualification in itself to practise as a solicitor or barrister, since this requires completion of the Solicitor's Qualifying Examination - (SQE), Legal Practice Course, Bar Professional Training Course, The CILEX Level 06 Diploma in Legal Practice or, if in Scotland, the Diploma in Legal Practice. As with other degrees, an LL.M. can be studied on a part-time basis at many institutions and in some circumstances by distance learning. Some providers of the Bar Professional Training Course and the Legal Practice Course also allow the student to gain an LL.M. qualification on top of these professional courses by writing a dissertation.

The UK offers over 1000 different LL.Ms. Large law faculties such as Queen Mary University of London offer multiple programs, whilst other such as Aston University only offer one program. Some institutions allow those without a first degree in law into their LL.M. programme. Examples of such programmes include the Master of Studies in Legal Research at Oxford, the LL.M. degrees at the University of Edinburgh and LL.M.s at the University of Leicester In addition, Queen's University Belfast offers an LL.M. suite, accessible to legal and social science graduates, leading to specialization in sustainable development, corporate governance, devolution or human rights. Northumbria University offers an approach to the LL.M. qualification by starting the master's programme as an undergraduate. Students completing this four-year programme graduate with a combined LL.M. and Legal Practice Course professional qualification or BPTC.

==== Oxbridge ====
The University of Cambridge has a postgraduate law course, which formerly conferred an LL.B. on successful candidates (undergraduates studying law at Cambridge received a B.A.). In 1982 the LL.B. for postgraduate students was replaced with a more conventional LL.M. to avoid confusion with undergraduate degrees in other universities. Additionally, in 2012, the University of Cambridge introduced the M.C.L. (Masters of Corporate Law) aimed at postgraduate students with interests in corporate law. Graduates of the University of Cambridge Faculty of Law Master of Laws (LL.M.) program have gone on to serve as judges, government officials and academics.

The University of Oxford unconventionally names its Master of Laws B.C.L. (Bachelor of Civil Law) and M.Jur. (Magister Juris), and its research masters either MPhil (Master of Philosophy) or MSt (Master of Studies). Oxford continues to name its principal postgraduate law degree the B.C.L. for largely historic reasons, as the B.C.L. is one of the oldest degrees, having been conferred since the sixteenth century. The M.Jur. was introduced in 1991. At present there is no LL.M. degree conferred by the university. Oxford claims that the B.C.L. is "the most highly regarded taught masters-level qualification in the common law world". Additionally, the University of Oxford introduced the MSc in Law and Finance (MLF) and the MSc in Taxation in 2010 and 2016, respectively.

=== United States ===
In the United States, the acquisition of an LL.M. degree is often a way to specialize in an area of law such as tax law, business law, international business law, health law, trial advocacy, environmental law or intellectual property. A number of schools have combined J.D.-LL.M. programs, while others offer the degree through online study. Degree requirements vary by school, and they often differ for LL.M. students who previously earned a J.D. from an American law school and LL.M. students who previously earned a law degree from a non-American law school.

==== Programs for foreign legal graduates ====
An LL.M. degree from an ABA-approved law school also allows a foreign lawyer to be eligible to apply for admission to the bar in the U.S. states of Alabama, California, New Hampshire, New York, and Texas.

In addition, legal practice in the home jurisdiction plus a certain amount of coursework at an accredited law school qualifies a foreign legal graduate to take the bar exam in Alaska, the District of Columbia, Massachusetts, Missouri, Pennsylvania, Rhode Island, Tennessee, Utah and West Virginia. However, a number of states, including Arizona, Florida, Georgia, New Jersey and North Carolina only recognize J.D. degrees from accredited law schools as qualification to take the bar.

New York allows foreign lawyers from civil law countries to sit for the New York bar exam once they have completed a minimum of 24 credit hours (usually but not necessarily in an LL.M. program) at an ABA-approved law school involving at least two basic subjects tested on the New York bar exam, including 12 credits in specific areas of law. Lawyers from common-law countries have more lenient restrictions and may not need to study at an ABA-approved law school. Foreign lawyers from both civil law and common law jurisdictions, however, are required to demonstrate that they have successfully completed a course of law studies of at least three years that would fulfill the educational requirements to bar admission in their home country.

==== International law and other LL.M. programs ====
As of 2008, there is one LL.M. degree in International Law offered by The Fletcher School of Law and Diplomacy at Tufts University, the oldest school of international affairs in the United States. Given that the degree specializes in international law, the program has not sought ABA accreditation.

The University of Chicago Law School offers both an LL.M. and a Master of Comparative Law degree.

The Notre Dame Law School at the University of Notre Dame offers an LL.M in International Human Rights Law to JD graduates from ABA-accredited US schools or LL.B or equivalent from accredited non-US schools.

Both Duke University School of Law and Cornell Law School offer J.D. students the opportunity to simultaneously pursue an LL.M. in International and Comparative Law.

The UCLA Law School at University of California, Los Angeles offers an LL.M. in International and Comparative Law, Business Law, Media, Entertainment, and Technology Law and Policy Specialization, and Public Interest Law.

The University of Nebraska College of Law provides an LL.M. in Space, Cyber & Telecommunications Law, the only program providing focused study in these three areas. The program was established using a grant from NASA and a partnership with the U.S. Air Force Strategic Command.

St. Mary's University offers the LL.M. in International and Comparative Law, with students having the option to complete both it and their J.D. simultaneously.

The University of Tulsa College of Law offers an LL.M. in American Indian and Indigenous Peoples Law to J.D. graduates from ABA-accredited US schools or LL.B or equivalent from accredited non-US schools.

The University of Washington School of Law offers an LL.M. in Sustainable International Development, the first program of its kind to focus on international development law. LL.M. students in this program are also able to elect for a concentration in Indigenous Rights Law. The school offers a separate LL.M. degree in Asian and Comparative Law.

There is one institution that offers an ABA-approved LL.M that does not offer a J.D. degree. The U.S. Army Judge Advocate General's Legal Center and School offers an officer resident graduate course, a specialized program beyond the first degree in law, leading to an LL.M. in Military Law.

== See also ==
- Juris Doctor (J.D.)
- Magister Juris
- Master of Studies in Law
- List of Master of Laws programs
