= Awards in the Willem C. Vis International Commercial Arbitration Moot =

Awards in a moot court competition

Various moot court awards are annually given in the Willem C. Vis International Commercial Arbitration Moot in Vienna as well as the Willem C. Vis (East) Moot in Hong Kong. The top prizes in Vienna are the Pieter Sanders Award (Best Claimant Memorandum), the Werner Melis Award (Best Respondent Memorandum), the Martin Domke Award (Best Oralist), and the Eric Bergsten Award (Winner of the Moot; known as Frédéric Eisemann Award until 2017). Honourable Mentions are also awarded for the best oralists, memoranda, and teams that qualified for the knockout stages in the oral phase.

For the competition in Hong Kong, the top prizes are the David Hunter Award (Best Claimant Memorandum; known as Eric Bergsten Award until 2017), the Fali Nariman Award (Best Respondent Memorandum), the Neil Kaplan Award (Best Oralist), and the Eric Bergsten Award (Winner of the Moot; known as David Hunter Award until 2017). Like the Vienna competition, Honourable Mentions are awarded for the best oralists, memoranda, and teams that qualified for the knockout stages in the oral phase. Up until 2016, a separate winner for the Asian Division was also declared.

Between 2020 and 2022, due to COVID-19, both Vis moots were conducted online. In-person hearings resumed for both moots in 2023.

== Vis Moot in Vienna ==
=== Awards for the best memoranda in Vienna ===
Honourable Mentions are awarded for the best memoranda of the competition, and the Pieter Sanders Award is given for the Best Claimant Memorandum. During the first three Moots, the award was given for the Best Written Memoranda in support of the positions of Claimant and Respondent. Subsequently, the Werner Melis Award was introduced as a separate award for the Best Respondent Memorandum. Pieter Sanders was one of the founders of modern international commercial arbitration. He was one of the principal drafters of the New York Convention and the 1976 UNCITRAL Arbitration Rules. Professor Sanders was also founder of the Law Faculty of Erasmus University Rotterdam and co-founder of the International Council for Commercial Arbitration as well as the Netherlands Arbitration Institute. The Werner Melis Award is named after an Honorary President of the International Arbitral Centre of the Austrian Federal Economic Chamber (Vienna) and Honorary Vice-president of the International Council for Commercial Arbitration.

| Moot | Year | Winner of Best Claimant Memorandum | Winner of Best Respondent Memorandum |
|---|---|---|---|
| 1st | 1994 | University of Freiburg | NA |
| 2nd | 1995 | University of Basel | NA |
| 3rd | 1996 | University of Cologne | NA |
| 4th | 1997 | University of Copenhagen | Deakin University |
| 5th | 1998 | University of Münster | University of Münster |
| 6th | 1999 | University of Basel | University of Basel |
| 7th | 2000 | Heidelberg University | Heidelberg University |
| 8th | 2001 | University of Freiburg | University of Zagreb |
| 9th | 2002 | University of Queensland | University of Mainz |
| 10th | 2003 | University of Bonn | University of Cologne |
| 11th | 2004 | Heidelberg University; University of Zurich | National University of Singapore |
| 12th | 2005 | University of Copenhagen | Humboldt University of Berlin |
| 13th | 2006 | Columbia University; LMU Munich | LMU Munich |
| 14th | 2007 | University of Freiburg | University of Freiburg |
| 15th | 2008 | University of California, Berkeley | Heidelberg University |
| 16th | 2009 | University of Sydney | Stockholm University |
| 17th | 2010 | University of New South Wales | University of New South Wales |
| 18th | 2011 | Stockholm University | Queen's University; University of St. Gallen |
| 19th | 2012 | Harvard University; University of Zurich | University of Freiburg |
| 20th | 2013 | University of Belgrade; LMU Munich | National University of Singapore |
| 21st | 2014 | University of Freiburg | University of Fribourg (Switzerland) |
| 22nd | 2015 | Humboldt University of Berlin | National Law University, Jodhpur |
| 23rd | 2016 | University of Lucerne | University of Freiburg |
| 24th | 2017 | University of Freiburg; Columbia University; University of Geneva | LMU Munich |
| 25th | 2018 | University of Geneva | Humboldt University of Berlin |
| 26th | 2019 | University of Sydney | University of Vienna |
| 27th | 2020 | London School of Economics | University of Vienna |
| 28th | 2021 | Aarhus University | University of Zurich |
| 29th | 2022 | Heidelberg University | Sofia University |
| 30th | 2023 | Saarland University | University of Freiburg |
| 31st | 2024 | University of Hamburg | University of Zurich |
| 32nd | 2025 | University of Fribourg (Switzerland); University of Vienna | University of New South Wales |
| 33d | 2026 | University of Freiburg (Germany) | University of Fribourg (Switzerland) |

=== Award for the best individual oralist during the general rounds in Vienna ===
Honourable Mentions are awarded for the best oralists of the competition; the Martin Domke Award is awarded to the Best Individual Oralist. Both types of award are for the general rounds, and not elimination rounds. To be eligible for either award, a participant must have argued at least once for the Claimant and once for the Respondent. The Martin Domke Award was named after a former adjunct professor of law at New York University and a well-known scholar of international arbitration. Professor Domke was also vice president of the American Arbitration Association for 25 years and served as editor-in-chief of the then Arbitration Journal (now the Dispute Resolution Journal). He also was the author of Commercial Arbitration, published in 1965, and The Law and Practice of Commercial Arbitration, published in 1968.

| Moot | Year | Winner of Best Oralist | 2nd place | 3rd place |
|---|---|---|---|---|
| 1st | 1994 | Gregor Kirchhof, University of Freiburg | William Spiegelberger, Columbia University | Larisa Malakoff, Columbia University; Neil Oberman, Laval University |
| 2nd | 1995 | Chantal Niggemann, University of Freiburg | Neil Katz, Laval University | Dennis Willardt Zewillis, University of Copenhagen |
| 3rd | 1996 | Kay-Jannes Wegner, University of Cologne | Friedrich Blase, University of Cologne | Kelly Longton, Deakin University; Sebastian Semran, University of Cologne |
| 4th | 1997 | Camilla Andersen, University of Copenhagen | Corinne Widmer, University of Basel | Daniel Kalderimis, Victoria University of Wellington |
| 5th | 1998 | Biljana Dischlieva, Kiel University | Julia Tilgen, University of Freiburg | John Bona, University of Queensland |
| 6th | 1999 | Carmen Klein, University of Cologne | Martin Illmer, University of Mainz | Peter James Black, University of Queensland; Martina Peric, University of Zagreb |
| 7th | 2000 | Jan Stemplewitz, University of Münster | Philipp Schulte, University of Münster | Sarah Catherine Holland, University of Queensland |
| 8th | 2001 | Trevor Stockinger, Loyola Law School Los Angeles | Ivana Radic, University of Rijeka | Michael Karschau, Kiel University |
| 9th | 2002 | Marion Alice Jane Isobel, University of Queensland; Robina Kaye, University of Montpellier | | Mitja Kocmut, University of Ljubljana |
| 10th | 2003 | Andrew Molnar, Deakin University; Simun Soljo, University of New South Wales | | Lim Wei Lee, National University of Singapore |
| 11th | 2004 | Alexey Konovalov, Mari State University | Nawel Bailey, McGill University; Dominic Müller, Heidelberg University; Metka Potocnik, University of Ljubljana | |
| 12th | 2005 | Charmaine Roberts, University of New South Wales; Anna-Maria Tamminen, University of Vienna | Richard May, Victoria University of Wellington | Philip James Furniss, University of Ottawa; Sarah Santiago, Syracuse University |
| 13th | 2006 | Sonu Dhanju, Osgoode Hall Law School | Shonagh Margaret Brown, University of Aarhus; Erik Eastaugh, University of Ottawa, Kristen Miller, Franklin Pierce Law Center; Christopher Nahler, University of Vienna, Edward Russell, Monash University | |
| 14th | 2007 | Steven Wayne Hopkins, Southern Methodist University | Jason Stearns, Stetson University | David Quayat, University of Ottawa |
| 15th | 2008 | Lennart Beckhaus, University of Münster | Michael Lederer, University of Vienna | Jerald Hess, American University; Shen Narayanasamy, Monash University; Tariq Rangwala, Osgoode Hall Law School |
| 16th | 2009 | Oliver Jones, Lincoln's Inn | Sarah Wright, University of California | Alexander Fawke, Monash University |
| 17th | 2010 | Antonia Füller, University of Freiburg | Gregory Dixon, Duke University; Aashni Dalal, London School of Economics | |
| 18th | 2011 | Robin von Olshausen, University of Freiburg | Ethan Minshull, Tulane University | Douglas Alexander Cordeiro, Panthéon-Assas University; William Glaser, Pepperdine University |
| 19th | 2012 | Laura Liefländer, University of Hamburg | Bastian Nill, University of Freiburg | William Crowe, Fordham University; Newton Mak, Chinese University of Hong Kong; Malgorzata Pohl, University of Silesia; Angelina Sgier, University of Zurich; Genavieve Shingle, Pace University |
| 20th | 2013 | Kristen Holman, University of Ottawa | Lauren Watts, University of Washington | Abby Hilaire, University of Washington; Brie Coyle, University of Washington |
| 21st | 2014 | Sam Song, University of San Diego | Paulo Sergio De Albuquerque Coelho Filho, Universidade de São Paulo | Andres Sandoval, University of Florida |
| 22nd | 2015 | Kelvin Chong Yue Hua, National University of Singapore; Laura Fahrner, University of Freiburg | | Zain Jinnah, Harvard University |
| 23rd | 2016 | Karmijn Krooshof, University of Amsterdam; Rebecca Lennard, University of Notre Dame Australia; Dimitrios Peteves University of Florida | | |
| 24th | 2017 | Emily Domingo, Monash University; Natalie Kolos, University of Ottawa; Ashlyn Robinson, University of Florida | | |
| 25th | 2018 | Timothy Morgan, University of Sydney | Evanthia Kasiora, London School of Economics; Laura Korn, University of Freiburg; Lilian Winter, University of Freiburg | |
| 26th | 2019 | Terry Frederic, Brooklyn Law School | David Vucinic, University of Belgrade | Reto Tettamanti, University of St Gallen; Yves Tjon-A-Meeuw, University of Zurich |
| 27th (online) | 2020 | Afreen Taqvi, La Trobe University | Eleanor Dennis, McGill University | Gabriel Libório, Federal University of Rio de Janeiro |
| 28th (online) | 2021 | Francis Lake, BPP Law School | Madeleine Bosler, University of Sydney; Jonas Benedict Klein, Bucerius Law School | Efat Elsherif, McGill University |
| 29th (online) | 2022 | Frederik Kold Galsgaard, Aarhus University | Christian Grunau, University of Münster | Océane Kessler, University of Basel |
| 30th | 2023 | Killian Hayes Dockrell, University of Edinburgh | Elisa Alexandra Henke, Humboldt University of Berlin | Laurenz Faber, University of Vienna |
| 31st | 2024 | Yijun Cui, University of Sydney | Mathias Abildgaard Ohlsen, Aarhus University | Thomas Martyn, University of Sydney Sophia Danzer, University of Vienna |
| 32nd | 2025 | Sonia Ram, University of New South Wales | Madelize Breet, University of Queensland | Aman Mohamed, University of New South Wales |

=== Award for winner of the moot in Vienna ===
Previously the Frédéric Eisemann Award, the Eric Bergsten Award is awarded to the prevailing team in the championship round. The award is named after the founder of the moot. As the Vis has grown in the number of participating teams, the Vis has expanded from having originally only four teams advance into the elimination or knockout rounds to its current state where the top 64 of over 300 teams advance. From 1994 to 1996, the top four teams advanced; from 1997 to 1999, the top eight teams advanced; from 2000 to 2002, the top 16 teams advanced; and from 2003 to 2007, the top 32 teams advanced. Each team that advances to the elimination rounds receives an award for Honorable Mention for Best Team Orals.

| Moot | Year | Number of teams | Winner of the moot | Runner-up | 3rd place | 3rd place | QF |
|---|---|---|---|---|---|---|---|
| 1st | 1994 | 11 | Columbia University | Laval University | | | |
| 2nd | 1995 | | University of Freiburg | University of Nottingham | | | |
| 3rd | 1996 | | Cornell University | Deakin University | | | |
| 4th | 1997 | | University of Queensland | University of Cologne | | | |
| 5th | 1998 | | University of Münster | University of Queensland | | | |
| 6th | 1999 | | Deakin University | Tulane University | | | |
| 7th | 2000 | 80 | University of Queensland | Loyola Law School | | | |
| 8th | 2001 | | Monash University | University of Cologne | Harvard University | | |
| 9th | 2002 | 108 | National University of Singapore | University of Queensland | | | |
| 10th | 2003 | 128 | West Bengal National University of Juridical Sciences | Humboldt University of Berlin | | | |
| 11th | 2004 | 136 | Osgoode Hall Law School | Victoria University of Wellington | | | |
| 12th | 2005 | 150 | Stetson University | University of Vienna | | | |
| 13th | 2006 | 150 | Queen Mary, University of London | Stetson University | Columbia University | | |
| 14th | 2007 | 178 | University of Freiburg | University of Zagreb | Aarhus University | University of Belgrade | * Harvard University |
| 15th | 2008 | | Carlos III University of Madrid | Touro Law Center | University of Vienna | | |
| 16th | 2009 | 234 | Victoria University of Wellington | University of Pune | | | |
| 17th | 2010 | 255 | King's College London | University of Ottawa | Osgoode Hall Law School | University of Hamburg | |
| 18th | 2011 | 262 | University of Ottawa | University of Montevideo | | | * University of Belgrade |
| 19th | 2012 | 282 | Nalsar University of Law | University College London | Harvard University | | * Bucerius Law School |
| 20th | 2013 | 290 | City University of Hong Kong | Monash University | | | * Columbia University * Bucerius Law School |
| 21st | 2014 | 290 | Deakin University | National Law School of India University | Duke University | | * University of Belgrade |
| 22nd | 2015 | 298 | University of Ottawa | Singapore Management University | | | |
| 23rd | 2016 | 333 | University of Buenos Aires | Singapore Management University | Pontifical Catholic University of Paraná | | * National University of Singapore * University of Georgia |
| 24th | 2017 | 367 | University of Ottawa | Jindal Global Law School | Columbia University | University of Montevideo | * Maastricht University * Mackenzie Presbyterian University * National University of Singapore * University of Cambridge |
| 25th | 2018 | 362 | National Research University – Higher School of Economics | University of Cambridge | National Law School of India University | University of Bucharest | * Australian Catholic University * Columbia University * University of Dusseldorf * University of Passau |
| 26th | 2019 | 379 | Pennsylvania State University | University of Ottawa | Lomonosov Moscow State University | University of Zenica | * University of Sydney |
| 27th | 2020 (online) | 248 | West Bengal National University of Juridical Sciences | University of Freiburg | University of Hamburg | University of Queensland | * Chinese University of Hong Kong * Moscow State Institute of International Relations |
| 28th | 2021 (online) | 387 | Bucerius Law School | Singapore Management University | National Law University, Delhi | University of Ottawa | * University of Freiburg * London School of Economics * National Law University Odisha * University of Vienna |
| 29th | 2022 (online) | 367 | Sofia University | University of Hamburg | University of Pretoria | University of Sydney | * Singapore Management University * University of Vienna |
| 30th | 2023 | 387 | University of Vienna | University of Belgrade | Singapore Management University | University of Hamburg | * Stetson University * University of Geneva * University of Queensland * University of Mainz |
| 31st | 2024 | 373 | Bucerius Law School | University of Vienna | University of Tübingen | University of Pristina | * National Law University, Jodhpur * Mackenzie Presbyterian University * WU Vienna * Charles University Prague |
| 32nd | 2025 | 384 | University of St. Gallen | McGill University | University of Göttingen | WU Vienna | * University of Ottawa * Deakin University * University of Bonn * University of Würzburg |

== Vis Moot (East) in Hong Kong ==
=== Awards for best memoranda in Hong Kong ===
Honourable Mentions are also awarded for the best memoranda of the competition; the top memoranda receive separate prizes. Between 2004 and 2016, the Eric Bergsten Award was given for the Best Claimant's Memorandum in the Vis Moot (East) held in Hong Kong. It was renamed the David Hunter Award from 2017 onward. The Fali Nariman Award is given for the Best Respondent's Memorandum.

| Moot | Year | Winner of Best Claimant Memorandum | Winner of Best Respondent Memorandum |
|---|---|---|---|
| 1st | 2004 | LMU Munich | Loyola University Chicago |
| 2nd | 2005 | University of Houston Law Center | LMU Munich |
| 3rd | 2006 | LMU Munich | LMU Munich |
| 4th | 2007 | Fordham University School of Law | University of Victoria, British Columbia |
| 5th | 2008 | University of Freiburg | Hofstra University School of Law |
| 6th | 2009 | University of Freiburg | Harvard University; University of Mainz |
| 7th | 2010 | Osgoode Hall Law School | Stetson University |
| 8th | 2011 | Stetson University | University of Basel |
| 9th | 2012 | Bond University | University of Freiburg |
| 10th | 2013 | University of Basel | University of Freiburg |
| 11th | 2014 | Harvard University | NALSAR University of Law |
| 12th | 2015 | LMU Munich | Leibniz University Hannover |
| 13th | 2016 | LMU Munich | LMU Munich |
| 14th | 2017 | Stanford Law School | University of Helsinki |
| 15th | 2018 | University of Mannheim | University of Mainz |
| 16th | 2019 | Chinese University of Hong Kong | University of Freiburg |
| 17th/1st VVE | 2020 | Heidelberg University | City University of Hong Kong |
| 18th/2nd VVE | 2021 | University of Bucharest | Gujarat National Law University |
| 19th/3rd VVE | 2022 | LMU Munich | Heidelberg University |
| 20th | 2023 | Humboldt University of Berlin | University of Mannheim |
| 21st | 2024 | University of Zurich | University of Zurich |
| 22nd | 2025 | | |

=== Award for the best individual oralist during the general rounds in Hong Kong ===
Honourable Mentions are awarded for the best oralists of the competition; the Neil Kaplan Award is given for the Best Oralist during the General Rounds in the Vis Moot (East) held in Hong Kong.

| Moot | Year | Winner of Best Oralist |
|---|---|---|
| 1st | 2004 | Ipsita Dutta, West Bengal National University of Juridical Sciences |
| 2nd | 2005 | Joanne Berenger, Deakin University |
| 3rd | 2006 | Lily Lu, Loyola Law School |
| 4th | 2007 | Daniel J. Weiner, Fordham University School of Law |
| 5th | 2008 | Gautam Sood, Loyola Law School |
| 6th | 2009 | Frances Ma, Loyola Law School |
| 7th | 2010 | Susan Mathenge, Georgetown University Law Center |
| 8th | 2011 | David Teslicko, American University Washington College of Law |
| 9th | 2012 | Julian Egelhof, University of Freiburg |
| 10th | 2013 | Jakob Steiner, University of Basel |
| 11th | 2014 | Kaixu Li, China-EU School of Law |
| 12th | 2015 | Lachlan Hopwood, Bond University |
| 13th | 2016 | Naomi Ahsan, American University Washington College of Law |
| 14th | 2017 | Desmond Chong, Harvard University |
| 15th | 2018 | Uma Sharma, National University of Singapore |
| 16th | 2019 | Daniel Fong, National University of Singapore |
| 17th/1st VVE | 2020 (online) | Surya Jayakumar, Singapore Management University |
| 18th/2nd VVE | 2021 (online) | Gregory Magarian, University of Cincinnati; Wang Fengquan, Peking University; Yasmin Drill, University of Münster |
| 19th/3rd VVE | 2022 | Ida Pawlack, University of Münster |
| 20th | 2023 | Wei Xiaoqiao, Peking University School of Transnational Law |
| 21st | 2024 | Zhuo Chen, Peking University School of Transnational Law |
| 22nd | 2025 | Moritz Michel, Bucerius Law School |
| 23rd | 2026 | Thomas Purnell, University of Vienna |

=== Award for winner of the moot in Hong Kong ===
The David Hunter Award was awarded to the team prevailing in the oral rounds in Hong Kong between 2004 and 2016. From 2017 onward, it was renamed the Eric Bergsten Award. Honourable Mentions are also awarded to teams that reach the knockout stages. Up until 2016, a separate winner for the Asian Division was also declared; a selection of the highest-ranking Asian teams that failed to qualify for the knockout stages would compete within a pool in a round-robin format. This prize was removed due to the rising performances of Asian teams.

| Moot | Year | Number of teams | Winner of the moot | Runner-up | 3rd place | 3rd place | QF |
|---|---|---|---|---|---|---|---|
| 1st | 2004 | 14 | Tsinghua University | Loyola University Chicago | Monash University | University of Hong Kong | |
| 2nd | 2005 | 18 | West Bengal National University of Juridical Sciences | University of Houston | Deakin University | Humboldt University of Berlin | |
| 3rd | 2006 | 32 | Loyola Law School Los Angeles | Deakin University | Loyola University Chicago | Universidad Carlos III de Madrid | |
| 4th | 2007 | 46 | Pepperdine University School of Law | Monash University | National Law School of India University | University of Wisconsin | |
| 5th | 2008 | 51 | Griffith University | | Fordham University | | |
| 6th | 2009 | 64 | Loyola Law School Los Angeles | Stetson University | La Trobe University | Hamline University | |
| 7th | 2010 | 75 | University of Freiburg | Deakin University | University of Houston | LMU Munich | |
| 8th | 2011 | 87 | Bond University | City University of Hong Kong | University of Freiburg | University of Hong Kong | * Bucerius Law School |
| 9th | 2012 | 90 | City University of Hong Kong | University of Houston | La Trobe University | University of St Gallen | * Harvard University |
| 10th | 2013 | 93 | University of Canberra | University of Münster | Bond University | Chinese University of Hong Kong | |
| 11th | 2014 | 99 | Loyola University Chicago | Universiteit van Amsterdam | China-EU School of Law | University of Bucharest | |
| 12th | 2015 | 107 | Singapore Management University | Arizona State University | Symbiosis Law School | West Bengal National University of Juridical Sciences | |
| 13th | 2016 | 133 | Chinese University of Hong Kong | Singapore Management University | Nalsar University of Law | National University of Singapore | |
| 14th | 2017 | 128 | West Bengal National University of Juridical Sciences | Nalsar University of Law | Singapore Management University | University of Bucharest | |
| 15th | 2018 | 133 | ILS Law College | University of Freiburg | Singapore Management University | University of Ankara | |
| 16th | 2019 | 136 | Universiteit van Amsterdam | Jindal Global Law School | National Law Institute University | University of Bucharest | |
| 17th/1st VVE | 2020 (online) | 70 | Chinese University of Hong Kong | Law School, University of São Paulo | Singapore Management University | Maharashtra National Law University, Mumbai | * NALSAR University of Law * National Law School of India University * National Law University, Jodhpur * Pontifical Catholic University of São Paulo |
| 18th/2nd VVE | 2021 (online) | 150 | Fordham University | * | Humboldt University of Berlin | University of Mainz | * National Law School of India University * Yonsei University * Charles University * Universitas Katolik Parahyangan |
| 19th/3rd VVE | 2022 (online) | 140 | Singapore Management University | Monash University | University of Münster | National University of Singapore | * Bucerius Law School * Humboldt University of Berlin * Tsinghua University * University of Tübingen |
| 20th | 2023 | 111 | Royal Institute of Colombo | National Law School of India University | Universitas Katolik Parahyangan | University of Mannheim | * NALSAR University of Law * National Law University, Delhi * Singapore Management University * University of Münster |
| 21th | 2024 | 144 | National Law University, Jodhpur | Charles University | Peking University | National Law University, Delhi | * NALSAR University of Law * National Law School of India University * Singapore Management University * Federal University of Rio Grande do Sul |
| 22nd | 2025 | 159 | Singapore Management University | National Law University, Delhi | Universitas Prasetiya Mulya | Deakin University | * * |
| 23rd | 2026 | 172 | Humboldt University of Berlin | Hidayatullah National Law University | University of San Diego | Bucerius Law School | |

- Note: due to an alleged glitch in the scoring, teams that did not advance to Round of 32 were permitted to advance directly to the semi-final round without going through the Round of 32, Round of 16, and quarterfinal.
