= Van Calster =

Van Calster is a surname. Notable people with the surname include:

- Geert Van Calster (born 1970), Belgian lawyer and legal scholar
- Guido Van Calster (born 1956), Belgian cyclist

== See also ==
- Van Colster baronets
