= Willem C. Vis Moot =

International moot competition

Willem C. Vis Moots
- Established: 1993 (Vis); 2003 (Vis East)
- Venue: Vienna (Vis); Hong Kong (Vis East)
- Subject matter: International commercial arbitration
- Class: Grand Slam
- Record participation: Vienna: 407 teams (2026; 387 teams for online (2021)); Hong Kong: 172 teams (2026; 150 teams for online (2021))
- Qualification: None
- Most championships: Vienna: University of Ottawa (3); Hong Kong: Singapore Management University (3)
- Website: Vienna: www.vismoot.org Hong Kong: www.cisgmoot.org

The Willem C. Vis International Commercial Arbitration Moot or Vis Moot is an international moot competition. Since 1994, it has been held annually in Vienna, Austria, attracting approximately 400 law schools from all around the world and spurring the creation of more than 30 pre-moots each year before the actual rounds are held in Vienna. It is the largest arbitration moot competition, and second-largest moot overall, in the world; considered a grand slam or major moot. A sister moot, known as the Willem C. Vis (East) Moot, is held in Hong Kong just before the rounds in Vienna. It was established in 2003 and attracts around 150 teams every year, making it the second largest commercial arbitration moot and also a grand slam moot. It uses the same moot problem as the Vis Moot, as does the various pre-moot friendlies.

The objective of both Vis moots is to foster study in the area of international commercial arbitration and encourage the resolution of business disputes by arbitration. The problem for the moot is always based on an international sales transaction subjected to the United Nations Convention on Contracts for the International Sale of Goods (referred to commonly as the CISG) and also involves procedural issues of arbitration such as jurisdiction and powers of an arbitral tribunal. The moot consists of submitting written memoranda for both claimant and respondent before the oral phase of the competition, though the written arguments have no bearing on either the preliminary rounds or knockout stages in the oral phase.

== Background ==
=== About Willem C. Vis ===
The moot is named after Willem Cornelis Vis (1924–1993), an expert in international commercial transactions and dispute settlement procedures. Vis was born in Utrecht and graduated from Leiden University and Nijmegen University in the Netherlands. He also read law, economics and philosophy at Magdalen College, Oxford. Vis began to work for European co-operation in 1957 as a member of the Council of Europe Secretariat, in its human rights and legal affairs directorates, and later, in 1965, became deputy secretary-general of the International Institute for the Unification of Private Law (UNIDROIT) in Rome. In 1968, he moved to the United Nations Secretariat in New York, where he became senior legal officer, then chief of the International Trade Law Branch of the United Nations Office of Legal Affairs, and secretary of the United Nations Commission on International Trade Law (UNCITRAL). Vis served as executive secretary of the Vienna Diplomatic Conference that created the United Nations Convention on Contracts for the International Sale of Goods (CISG). He helped craft the UNCITRAL Arbitration Rules, and was Representative of the Netherlands to the UNCITRAL and served as chair of its Working Group on International Payments. He served on the faculty of Pace University School of Law from 1980 until his death in 1993. At Pace, he continued to participate in the development of international commercial law, and was founding director of the Pace Institute of International Commercial Law.

=== Organisers and sponsors ===
The moot is organised by the Association for the Organization and Promotion of the Willem C. Vis International Commercial Arbitration Moot. The director was Pace Law School's professor emeritus Eric Bergsten, a former secretary of the UNCITRAL until his retirement in 2013 after the 20th annual moot. The current directors are Christopher Kee, Patrizia Netal, and Stefan Kroell.

The moot is sponsored by the International Centre for Dispute Resolution/American Arbitration Association, International Arbitral Centre of the Austrian Federal Economic Chamber, Australian Centre for International Commercial Arbitration, CEPANI (Belgium), Chartered Institute of Arbitrators, Chinese-European Arbitration Centre, German Institution of Arbitration, Hong Kong International Arbitration Centre, International Chamber of Commerce, Permanent Court of Arbitration, JAMS, London Court of International Arbitration, Moot Alumni Association, Singapore International Arbitration Centre, Swiss Arbitration Association, United Nations Commission on International Trade Law, Beijing International Arbitration Centre, Vienna International Arbitral Centre, and the University of Vienna Faculty of Law.

=== Vis East ===
Vis (East) Moot, Hong Kong

The Vis East Moot is the sister moot to the Vis Moot in Vienna. The Vis East takes place annually in Hong Kong. Founded in 2003 by Louise Barrington, a Canadian arbitrator based in Hong Kong, the Vis East was originally underwritten by the East Asia Branch of the Chartered Institute of Arbitrators. The Vis East uses the same moot problem and the rules are essentially the same as the Moot that takes place in Vienna. Nevertheless, they are two separate moots with separate registrations and fees, as well as separate winners – the Vis East is not a regional elimination moot for the Vienna competition. A law school can register for the Vis East, the Vienna moot, or both. While the same students can be on both teams, a student cannot present oral arguments in both the Hong Kong and the Vienna Moot in the same year even though both moots are held a week apart; further, students who have spoken in elimination rounds in previous editions (whether in Vienna or Hong Kong) cannot participate as an oralist in subsequent competitions. The first local host of the Vis East was the City University of Hong Kong; the 1st–3rd editions were held at City University's campus located in Kowloon Tong. The following two moots were hosted by the Chinese University of Hong Kong at its campus in Central. From the 6th edition to the 16th edition, the Vis East Moot moved back to City University of Hong Kong. The general rounds and elimination rounds are now held at Justice Place, in Central Hong Kong. The Directors of the Vis East Moot are Barrington and Sherlin Tung.

=== Online edition ===
In 2020, due to COVID-19 pandemic, both Vis moots were conducted online during the originally scheduled dates, paving the way to the first editions of the Virtual Vis East and Virtual Vis respectively. Around 70 out of the original 140 teams that had signed up participated in the First Virtual Vis East, while the number for the virtual rounds for Vienna was around 250 out of 390. As air travel restrictions did not improve, it was decided that the 2021 and 2022 editions of both Vis moots would be online as well. Both Vis moots returned to the in-person format in 2023.

=== Moot problem ===
Danubia is a fictional country, which has enacted the UNCITRAL Model Law on International Commercial Arbitration as well as the Convention on the Recognition and Enforcement of Foreign Arbitral Awards (New York Convention). It always features as the seat of arbitration. The arbitration clause in the contract in the problem always provides that the dispute is to be decided by arbitration in Danubia under the institutional arbitration rules of one of the various arbitration institutions which sponsors the moot. The substantive issue always entails the United Nations Convention on Contracts for the International Sale of Goods (CISG).

Moot	Year	Arbitration rules used in the moot problem
1st	1994	UNCITRAL Arbitration Rules
2nd	1995	UNCITRAL Arbitration Rules
3rd	1996	International Arbitration Rules of the American Arbitration Association
4th	1997	Rules of Arbitration of the International Chamber of Commerce
5th	1998	UNCITRAL Arbitration Rules
6th	1999	International Arbitration Rules of the American Arbitration Association
7th	2000	Rules of the London Court of International Arbitration
8th	2001	Rules of Arbitration of the International Chamber of Commerce
9th	2002	International Arbitration Rules of the American Arbitration Association
10th	2003	Arbitration Rules of the German Institution of Arbitration
11th	2004	Arbitration Rules of the Singapore International Arbitration Centre
12th	2005	Swiss Rules of International Arbitration
13th	2006	Arbitration Rules of the Chicago International Dispute Resolution Association
14th	2007	Arbitration Rules of The Court of International Commercial Arbitration, Romania
15th	2008	JAMS International Arbitration Rules
16th	2009	Arbitration Rules of the Arbitration Institute of the Stockholm Chamber of Commerce
17th	2010	Arbitration Rules of the Australian Centre for International Commercial Arbitration
18th	2011	Arbitration Rules of the Chamber of National and International Arbitration of Milan
19th	2012	Arbitration Rules of the China International Economic and Trade Arbitration Commission
20th	2013	Arbitration Rules of the Chinese European Arbitration Centre
21st	2014	Arbitration Rules of the Belgian Centre for Arbitration and Mediation
22nd	2015	Rules of Arbitration of the International Chamber of Commerce
23rd	2016	Arbitration Rules of the Vienna International Arbitration Center
24th	2017	Arbitration Rules of Arbitration Center of the Chamber of Commerce Brazil-Canada
25th	2018	UNCITRAL Arbitration Rules
26th	2019	Arbitration Rules of the Hong Kong International Arbitration Centre
27th	2020	Rules of the London Court of International Arbitration
28th	2021	Swiss Rules of International Arbitration
29th	2022	Asian International Arbitration Centre Rules
30th	2023	Permanent Court of Arbitration Rules
31st	2024	Rules of Arbitration of the International Chamber of Commerce
32nd	2025	Arbitration Rules of the Finland Arbitration Institute
33rd	2026	Arbitration Rules of the Singapore International Arbitration Centre
34th	2027	Arbitration Rules of the American Arbitration Association (AAA-ICDR)
35th	2028	Arbitration Rules of the Cairo Regional Centre for International Commercial Arbitration
36th	2029	SCC Arbitration Rules (SCC Arbitration Institute)

== Competition structure ==
The Vis Moot consists of two parts. The written phase of the Vis Moot commences on the first Friday in October when the moot problem, consisting of initial statements of claim and defence by the parties' attorneys as well as motions regarding procedural questions and exhibits, is distributed to the participating teams. According to an order by the arbitral tribunal, both parties have to prepare a memorandum concerning factual and procedural issues. The memorandum supporting the position of the claimant is due early in December. As the moot proceeds, each team is sent a copy of the memorandum for claimant of one of the other teams in the moot. The memorandum for respondent is prepared in response to the memorandum received, and is due in mid-January. With the submission of the memorandum for respondent, the written phase is closed. Awards for the best memoranda in the competition will not be presented to the teams until the last day of the oral arguments. As opposed to some other international mooting competitions, there is no selection of the teams who can proceed to the oral arguments based on the quality of their memoranda – every team that is participating in the Vis Moot gets to go to Vienna or Hong Kong.

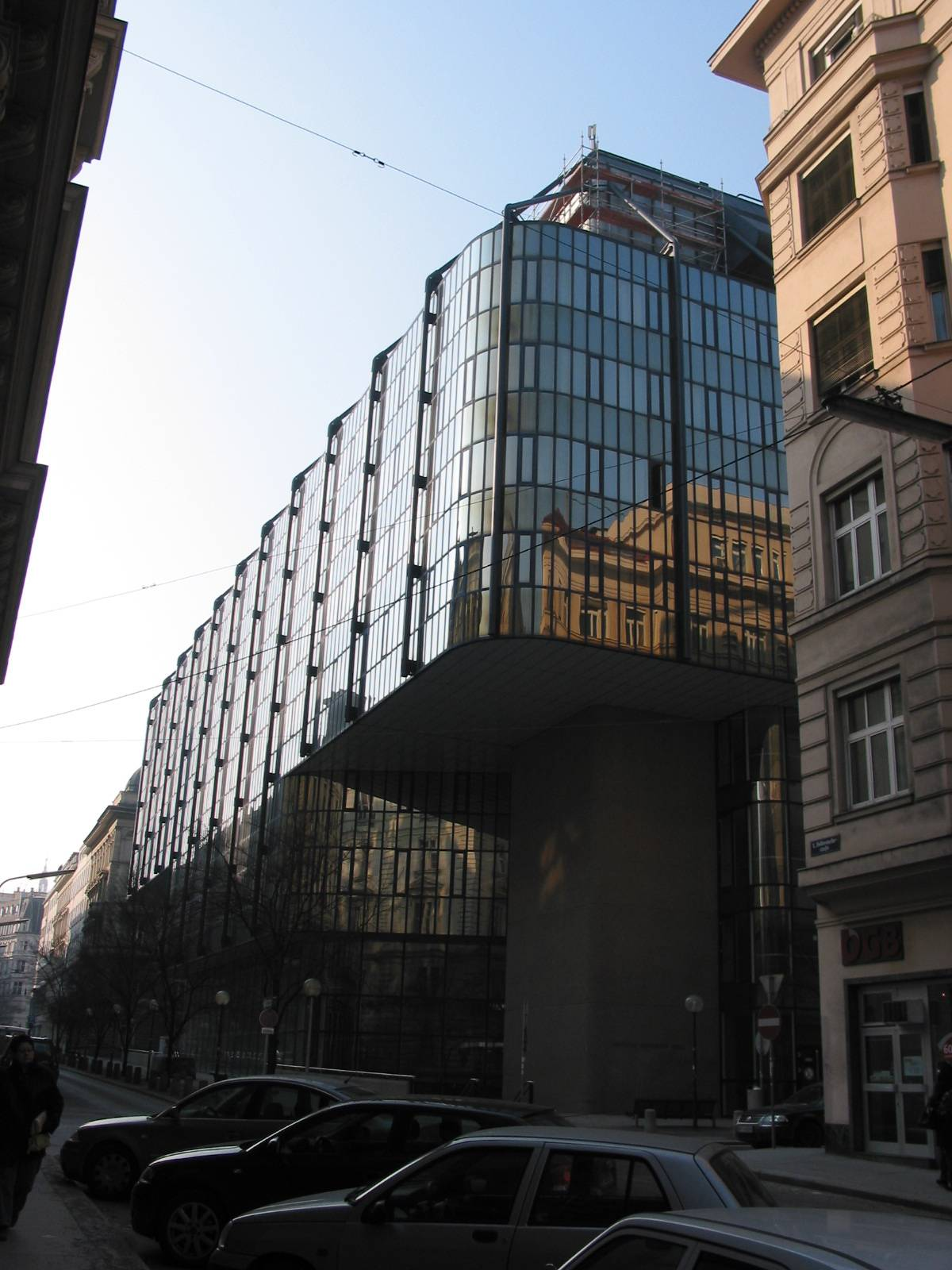
Juridicum, University of Vienna

The oral arguments then take place in Vienna and Hong Kong. In Vienna, they begin every year with a formal opening reception on the Friday a week before Easter and close with the finals on Thursday of Holy Week. On Thursday night preceding the opening ceremony, the Moot Alumni Association traditionally organises its welcoming party for student participants, coaches, and moot alumni. The general rounds of the oral arguments take place at the Law Faculty of the University of Vienna (the Juridicum) and several near-by law offices on Saturday through Tuesday. They start on Saturday morning, 8:30 a.m. (for those 25 or so teams who have caught the first "slot"), with every competing team arguing in four hearings (against four different teams, usually pairing a team from a civil law country with a team from a common law country) during the next four days. The preliminary rounds conclude on Tuesday afternoon with the announcement of the 64 highest-ranking teams (32 for Hong Kong) which move on to the elimination rounds. Entering elimination rounds is an achievement in itself, especially since the scoring in general rounds is not consistent across the board. Elimination rounds subsequently take place on Tuesday night, Wednesday and Thursday, culminating in the final argument. The moot closes with an awards banquet following the final argument.

=== Pre-moots ===
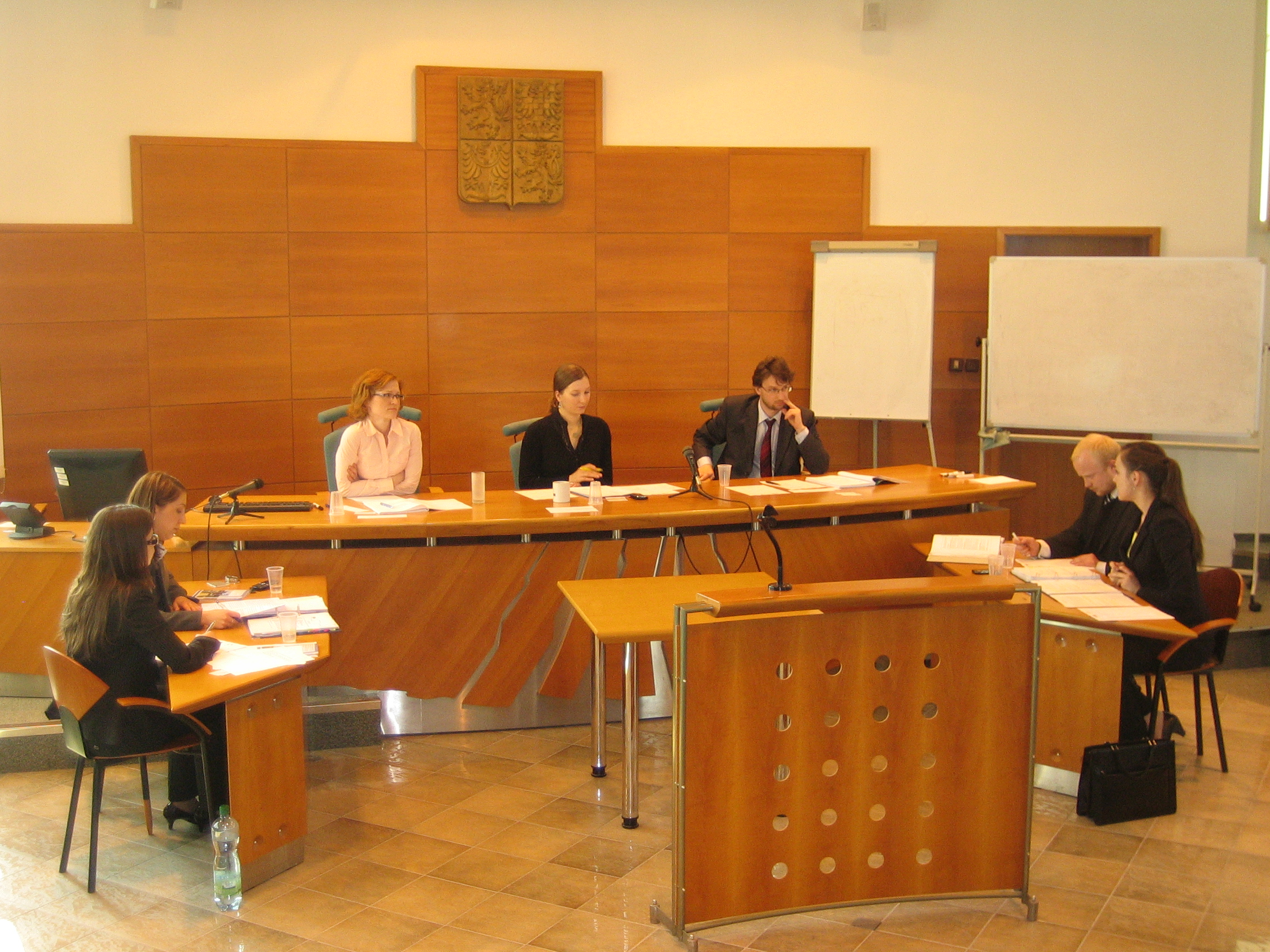
Pre-moot at Olomouc Faculty of Law courtroom

As popularity for the Vis moots has continually grown, many schools now participate in sessions to practice the presentation of their argument, before ultimately travelling to Vienna or Hong Kong for the actual moot. Examples of these pre-moots include:

- Belgrade Open held in Serbia. Organised since 2008, it has a turnout of around 60 teams a year
- Shanghai Moot held in Shanghai. Organised since 2010, it has a turnout of around 50 teams a year
- Asian International Arbitration Centre competition held in Kuala Lumpur. Organised since 2017, it has a turnout of around 80 teams a year
- CIArb Australia competition held in Melbourne. Organised since 2018, it has a turnout of around 20 teams a year
- Permanent Court of Arbitration's pre-moots hosted in various parts of the world
- Fox Williams/CIArb competition held in London. Organised since 2015, it has a turnout of around 30 teams per year
- Stockholm Pre-moot held yearly in Sweden. Co-organised by Stockholm University, SCC Arbitration Institute, and the law firm Mannheimer Swartling.

=== Awards ===
Various awards are given in both Vienna and Hong Kong for the written and oral arguments (individual and team). Honourable Mentions are given to teams that make the knockout stages for the oral phase, written submissions, and individual performances during the oral phase. Best Memoranda and Best Oralist prizes are also given to the top-3 in each category.

=== Venues ===
The different occasions during the oral phase of the Vienna Moot have not always been held at the venues they take place at today. As the Vis Moot grew over the years, the space needed grew with it, and required a number of venue changes from year to year. The opening reception, for example, was held at the UNCITRAL headquarters during the first three Moots (1994–96), and subsequently moved to the building of the old Vienna Stock Exchange (the "Börse"), the Ronacher Theatre (until 2005) and then the Konzerthaus (13th Moot, 2006). In 2007, the opening reception was held at the Stadthalle, but it returned to the Konzerthaus in 2008.

From the 1st until the 3rd Vis Moot (1994–96), the oral hearings proper were held at the International Arbitral Centre of the Austrian Federal Economic Chamber (Wiedner Hauptstrasse 63 in Vienna's 4th district), thus taking place in the very rooms where ordinary arbitration hearings are held. Only from the 4th Moot (1997) onwards, the oral hearings took place at the Juridicum of the Faculty of Law, University of Vienna. During the more recent moots, some of the hearings have been held at the offices of nearby law firms (since the Juridicum alone could no longer accommodate the growing number of hearings), namely at the offices of Dorda Brugger Jordis (since the 11th Moot 2004), DLA Piper Weiss-Tessbach (since the 16th Moot 2009) and Baker McKenzie: Diwok Hermann Petsche (since the 17th Moot 2010).

The location for the championship final remained at the Vienna International Arbitral Centre even longer; the last hearing of each year's moot was held there from the 1st until the 6th Moot (1994–99). From the 7th until the 10th Moot (2000–03), the final hearing took place at the Festsaal of the Vienna City Hall (the Rathaus), and since the 11th Moot (2004) it has moved to the Messen. The awards banquet following the championship final was held at the Piaristenkeller, a historic Viennese restaurant, during the 1st and 2nd Moots (1994–95), then at the Rathauskeller of the Vienna City Hall (at the 3rd Moot, 1996) and subsequently at the same building's Festsaal (4th until 10th Moot, 1997–2003). Since the 11th Moot (2004), it has been held at the Messe.

One location that has remained unchanged in its important role in the Moot (since the 4th Moot, when it was first used for moot purposes) is the "Dachgeschoss". The term "Dachgeschoss" (German for "top floor"; literally "roof floor" (Dach = roof, Geschoss = floor)), which has become part of the international moot vocabulary, refers to the top floor (7th floor) of the Juridicum in Vienna. It houses the moot administration (where teams and arbitrators register, the arbitrators pick up and hand in their score sheets, and tickets for the awards banquet are available), the MAA (Moot Alumni Association) desk, displays by various sponsoring law publishers (often offering special "moot deals") and - maybe most importantly - chairs, tables and lounge areas for the participants and arbitrators to meet and linger. The Dachgeschoss is where the hearing schedule for the day (listing the teams, the hearing room and the arbitrators) is posted every morning. During the elimination rounds, this is also the place where teams and arbitrators will gather after each round to learn with team will move on to the next round.

== Cultural reception ==
The Vis moots are considered two of the most prestigious moot competitions in the world. With leading scholars and practitioners in the field of international sales law and international arbitration acting as arbitrators to judge the various teams, the competition has been referred to as the "Olympics of international trade law", and has been credited for engaging in emerging issues in this domain, bridging the divide between civil and common law cultures, and training the next generation of international arbitration lawyers. It draws participation from many law schools from all over the world. In 1994, when the first Moot was held, 11 teams took part. Since then, the field has grown rapidly: The 26th Moot, held in 2019, saw more than 300 teams enter the competition. In most law schools, being selected as a team member is in itself a sign of excellence. The moot's popularity has grown rapidly over the last decade of its existence. The moot gives an opportunity to law students to interact with law students from other countries and other cultures thereby equipping them with a multicultural approach which is undoubtedly an asset in international arbitrations as well as one of the aims of this competition.

== Moot Alumni Association (MAA) ==
The Moot Alumni Association (MAA) is the alumni association of both Vis moots. It was founded in 1996 after the 3rd Vis Moot and is a non-profit association registered under Austrian law with its seat in Vienna. With a 5,000+ strong membership, the MAA is composed of students as well as distinguished academics and practitioners, and internationally renowned arbitrators and practitioners. In 2019, the MAA established a Core Team, expanding its reach and projects. The MAA Core Team is responsible for various MAA Projects such as the publication of the Vindobona Journal of International Commercial Law and Arbitration, facilitating internships and employment related to these areas of law, a Mentor-Mentee Programme, a Diversity & Inclusion Committee, China Project, MAA Speaker Series and other legal conferences and seminars, and collaboration with the United Nations Commission on International Trade Law (UNCITRAL) and the Institute of International Commercial Law, Pace Law School. The MAA's other activities include organising the annual Generations in Arbitrations Conference and Peter Schlectriem CISG Conference, and social events for Vis participants.
