= Csongor István Nagy =

- Born: December 16, 1979 (age 45); Cluj-Napoca, Romania

Csongor István Nagy is a professor in commercial law at the University of Galway, School of Law, Ireland, a professor of law at the University of Szeged, Hungary and research professor at the HUN-REN Centre for Social Sciences. He is a recurrent visiting professor at the Central European University, and the Sapientia University of Transylvania, and an associate member of the Center for Private International Law at the University of Aberdeen, Scotland. He is admitted to the Budapest Bar and listed at various arbitral institutions.

== Education ==
Nagy graduated from the Eötvös Loránd University (ELTE), Faculty of Law in Budapest, where he also earned a PhD. He received master's (LL.M) and S.J.D degrees from the Central European University, and a D.Sc. degree from the Hungarian Academy of Sciences. He pursued graduate studies in Rotterdam, Heidelberg and Ithaca, New York (Cornell University).

== Career ==
He had visiting appointments in the Hague (Asser Institute), Munich (Max Planck Institute), Hamburg (Max Planck Institute), Brno (Masarykova University), Hamburg (Max Planck Institute), Edinburgh (University of Edinburgh), London (British Institute of International and Comparative Law), Riga (Riga Graduate School of Law), Bloomington, Indiana University Bloomington, Brisbane, Australia (TC Beirne School of Law, University of Queensland), Beijing (China-EU School of Law), Taipei, Taiwan (National Chengchi University), Florence (European University Institute), Rome (LUISS: Libera Università Internazionale degli Studi Sociali) and Ann Arbor, Michigan (University of Michigan). He was senior fellow at the Center for International Governance Innovation in Canada and Eurojus legal counsel in the European Commission's Representation in Hungary.

In 2014, he won the “Momentum II” grant of the Hungarian Academy of Sciences, which is awarded to “internationally recognized leading scholars, who have a steadily outstanding and increasing performance”. In the frame of this, he founded the “Federal Markets” Research Group in the HAS Center for Social Sciences. In 2018, as principal investigator, he headed a consortium of universities which was awarded a major EU grant to carry out a comprehensive private international law research project in Central Europe (Cross-border litigation in Central-Europe – CEPIL, H2020: JUST-AG-2017 Grant, nr. 800789).

== Bibliography ==
Professor Nagy has more than 280 publications in English, French, German, Hungarian, Romanian and (in translation) in Croatian and Spanish. His works have been cited, among others, by the Court of Justice of the European Union and Hungarian courts and have been relied upon in litigation before the Supreme Court of the United States. He is also the author of numerous legal books.
