= Attila Menyhárd =

Hungarian lawyer and professor

- Born: November 22, 1968 (age 57); Esztergom, Hungary
- Scientific career
- Fields: Civil law

Attila Menyhárd is a Hungarian lawyer, a professor of civil law and the head of the Department at Eötvös Loránd University (hereafter ELTE), Faculty of Law, Civil Law Department in Budapest, Hungary.

== Biography ==
Menyhárd earned his law degree from Eötvös Loránd University in 1993. During his studies he became a member of Eötvös Loránd University István Bibó College of Law and Political Sciences. He admitted to the Budapest bar association in 1997. He promoted with PhD degree in 2003 in ELTE Law Faculty (Budapest) with the thesis on immoral contracts. He habilitated in 2007 with his book on property law and his thesis on human rights in private law.
He is teaching the whole range of private law and has special courses in contract law, tort law, property law, commercial law, law and economics, law and literature, human rights in private law, European business law and European company law. Upon the invitation of the Ministry of Justice he contributed the project for a new Hungarian Civil Code, being liable for the provisions on property law and rent law. Professor Menyhárd is participant in several international research projects and programs. He is the Hungarian fellow of European Centre of Tort and Insurance Law (Wien). He participates in the Trento Common Core Project in Product Liability and in Property Law. Professor Menyhárd is a listed member of the Arbitration Court attached to the Hungarian Chamber of Commerce and Industry, Budapest. Within the China-EU School of Law he is in charge of representing ELTE (Budapest). In March 2012 Menyhárd was appointed as university full professor by the President of Hungary.

His special research fields are: contract law, tort law, property law, commercial law, corporate law, human rights and private law, and economic analysis of law.

== Selected works ==
He is the author of four books and more than eighty other publications in tort law, contract law, property law, company law, law and economics and human rights in private law in Hungarian, English and German language in Hungary as well as in abroad.

Some of his works which were written in English:

- The Hungarian Tort Law 2003-2009.; European Tort Law 2003, Springer, Wien/New York, (2004–2010).
- Tort and Regulatory Law in Hungary., Tort and Regulatory Law, Springer Verlag, Wien/New York (2007).
- Natural Causation in Hungarian Tort Law., Digest of European Tort Law Vol. 1: Essential Cases on Natural Causation, Springer Verlag, Wien/New York (2007).
- Natural Causation as a Prerequisite for Liability in Hungarian Tort Law (case comment on „loss of a chance”).., 16 Eur. Rev. Priv. Law (2008).
- Contract Law in a Changing Society – Hungarian Experiences., The Private Law and the Many Cultures in Europe, Kluwer Law International (2007).
- Consumer Protection and Private Law., The Transformation of the Hungarian Legal Order 1985 – 2005 Kluwer Law International.
- Punitive Damages in Hungary., Punitive Damages: Common Law and Civil Law Perspectives. Wien; New York: Springer-Verlag, (2009).
- Aggregation and Divisibility of Damage in Hungary: Tort Law and Insurance., Aggregation and Divisibility of Damage. Wien; New York: Springer-Verlag, (2009).
- Damages Caused by Genetically Modified Organisms in Hungarian Tort Law., Damage Caused by Genetically Modified Organisms: Comparative Survey of Redress Options for Harm to Persons, Property or the Environment. Berlin; New York: De Gruyter, (2010).
- The Development of Legal Techniques and Legal Culture in the New Context of Europe., Text and Context: The Development of Legal Techniques and Legal Culture in the New Context of Europe. Baden-Baden: Nomos(2010).
