= Stéphanie Balme =

French academic

Stéphanie Balme is a French academic scholar specializing in political science and international relations. In late 2023, she became the Director of the Centre for International Studies (CERI) at Sciences Po/French National Centre for Scientific Research (CNRS). From 2018 to 2023, she served as the Dean of the Sciences Po Undergraduate College.

== Early life and education ==
Balme completed her Habilitation in Law in 2016 and earned a PhD in Political Science in 2000 under the supervision of Professor Guy Hermet. She holds degrees from several institutions, including Sciences Po, INALCO, IEP Bordeaux, Fudan University (Shanghai), and the Faculty of Letters of Bordeaux.

== Career ==
While based in Beijing from 2018 to 2019, at the French Ministry of Foreign Affairs, Balme focused on Franco-Chinese scientific cooperation. She was a professor at the Paris School of International Affairs (PSIA) and a research professor at the Fondation Nationale des Sciences Politiques (FNSP/Sciences Po).

Balme was elected as the Director of Sciences Po's Centre de recherches internationales (CERI). Balme became the first female director of the joint Sciences Po - CNRS research unit on January 2, 2024, succeeding Alain Dieckhoff (CNRS), who held the position since 2013.

She co-founded the European Science Diplomacy Initiative (ESDI), established in 2020, alongside Pierre Lemonde and Enrico Letta, and helped develop courses on science diplomacy at Sciences Po. Balme has taught at institutions in Paris, Hong Kong, Beijing, New Delhi (Ashoka University), Montreal (UQAM), Vancouver (UBC), and served as a visiting professor at Columbia University in New York.

== Publications ==
=== Books ===
- Chine, les visages de la justice ordinaire – Entre faits et droit, Presses de Sciences Po, 2016
- Le procès civil en version originale. Cultures judiciaires comparées : France, Chine, Etats-Unis (English Title: The Civil Trial in Original Version: Comparative Judicial Cultures: France, China, United States), co-authored with Antoine Garapon, Li Bin and Daniel Schimmel, Ebook, LexisNexis, Paris, New York, 2014.
- La Tentation de la Chine: Nouvelles idées reçues sur une puissance en mutation, Le Cavalier Bleu, Paris, April 2013, 350p.
- Building Constitutionalism in China (eds.) with Michael Dowdle, Palgrave-Macmillan CERI, New York, 2009, 322p.
- La Chine et les Etats-Unis: fascinations et rivalités, (English title: China and the US: Between Fascination and Rivalry), co-authored with Daniel Sabbagh (CERI/Sciences Po), Autrement, Paris, 2008, 172p.
- Vietnam’s New Order: International Perspectives on the State and Law Reform, with Mark Sidel (eds.), Palgrave-Macmillan CERI, 2006, 272p.
- La Chine – Les Idées Reçues, Cavalier Bleu, Paris, 2004, (2nd edition 2008), 140p.
- Entre soi, l’élite du pouvoir dans la Chine contemporaine, (English title: Power Elite in Contemporary China), Fayard, Paris, 2004, 474p.
- 你对法律了解多少? (in Chinese) (English title: What do you know about Law?), co-authored with Judge Wang Yaqin, Nanjing Shifan Daxue Chubanshe, Nanjing, 2009, 48p.

=== Book chapters or reviews (selection) ===
- “Chine: la règle de droit aux marges d'un empire bureaucratique et absolutiste (1978-2014)”, Revue Francaise d’administration publique, N. 150 September 2014, 2 Paris, pp.393–413
- “Rule of Law as a Watermark: China’s Legal and Judicial Challenges”, The World Bank Law Review, Washington, December 2012, 22p.
- "China: Law and Society", in Mireille Delmas-Marty; Pierre-Etienne Will, China and Democracy, 2011, 32p.
- "Local Courts in Western China: The Quest for Independence and Dignity”, Chapter 8 in Randy Peerenboom (eds.), Judicial Independence in China: A Comparative Developmental Approach, Oxford University Press, Oxford, 2009, pp.154-180.
- “Ordinary Justice and Popular Constitutionalism in China”, Chapter 11 in Balme, Dowdle (eds.), 2009, 178-200p.
- “China’s Constitutional Research and Teaching: A State of the Art”, by Prof. Tong Zhiwei, (translated by author) in Balme, Dowdle (eds.), 2009, pp.98-112p.
- “Introduction to Chinese Political System” (in French) in Antonin Cohen; Lacroix Bernard, Comparative Political Science Textbook, La Découverte, 2009. 28p.
- "Droit et politique en Chine après Mao" (Law and Politics after Mao) (in French), in Mireille Demas-Marty; P.-E Will, La Chine et la Démocratie, Fayard, 2007, Paris, 50p.
- "China’s Soft Power Strategy", CERISCOPE, September 2013 (in French).
- “Access to Justice in China: Review of Efforts to Improve Judicial Efficiency and Reduce Judicial Costs”, EU-UNDP-The People's Supreme Court of the PRC, May 2012 (bilingual: Chinese/English), 40p.
- “‘世俗化’与法治的概念：关于法国“禁止在公共场所穿遮面长袍（burka）”新法案的讨论”, “French Conceptions of “Laicity” and Rule of Law: Debating the New Law Banning Full-face Veil in Public Places in France” (in Chinese), Tsinghua University Law Review, December 2011.
- "The Judicialization of Politics and the Politicisation of the Judiciary in China (1978-2005)", The Global Jurist Frontiers, vol 5, n° 1, 2005 (Berkeley Electronic Law Review)
- “Communism and Schizophrenia: Individual Citizens and Law in Post-Revolutionary China" (in French), Raisons Politiques, Special edition, n°3, Autumn 2001, Paris, 32p.

== See also ==
- Sciences Po
- CNRS
