= Geert Van Calster =

Geert Van Calster (born 1970) is a Belgian lawyer and legal scholar, focusing on conflict of laws (private international law), international trade law, EU and international environmental law, EU economic law, and investment and commercial arbitration. He is full professor of Law at KU Leuven, was the head of its department of European and International Law for 11 years between 2009 and 2020, and is a senior fellow at KU Leuven's Centre for Global Governance Studies. He is a former director of the Centre for Advanced Legal Studies at KU Leuven and former program director for the Master of Energy and Environmental Law (2002-2012). He is also a visiting professor at Monash University (Melbourne), at King's College London, and a senior fellow at Melbourne University School of Law. He is adjunct professor at American University, a former visiting lecturer at the University of Oxford and a former visiting professor at the China-EU School of Law in Beijing and Erasmus University, Rotterdam. Between 1994 and 2015, he was affiliated as of counsel (practising) with international law firms, respectively SJ Berwin; Andersen Legal; Dibb, Lupton, Alsop; and DLA Piper. He now runs his own, independent legal practice. He was called to the bar in 1999. He hosts a blog posting mostly on international dispute resolution at www.gavclaw.com .

He graduated in law at Leuven in 1993, and received an LL.M. from the College of Europe (promotion Stefan Zweig 1993-1994) and a PhD from Leuven in 1999. He was Chevening Scholar at St Edmund Hall, University of Oxford 1997-1998.
