= Asian Correspondent =

English language news website

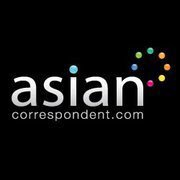
- Website type: News & blogging
- Available in: English
- Headquarters: Colston Tower, Colston Street, Bristol
- Owner: Hybrid (media company)
- Creator: James Craven (Managing Director)
- Website: www.asiancorrespondent.com
- Launched: 19 October 2009
- Current status: Defunct

Asian Correspondent was an English language news website launched in October 2009 by Hybrid (media company) that combined articles by professional journalists, bloggers and news wire content in one website. Asian Correspondent was the online partner for the Associated Press in Asia, and provided breaking news, opinion pieces, and analysis for the Asia-Pacific region.

As of 20 Sept 2021, the website is gone, and any attempts to load a page within the www.asiancorrespondent.com domain are redirected to techhq.com.

== Content ==
Asian Correspondent is a combination of news stories, analysis, and blog content, a format which has earned the website comparisons to the Huffington Post. The site is divided in sections including News, Politics, Education, Media, Environment, Culture, Travel, and Technology.

Less than a year after its creation, in May 2010, Asian Correspondent hit the millionth visitor mark,

== In the media ==
Asian Correspondent is often quoted in other media. Qz.com has cited its content on multiple occasions, most recently in May 2014 for its coverage of the military coup in Thailand, as well as in July 2013 for a story about bitcoin.
