= University for Continuing Education Krems =

Austrian university

Coordinates: 48°24′28″N 15°35′10″E

- Universität für Weiterbildung Krems
- Type: Public
- Established: 1994; 32 years ago
- Vice-Chancellor: Viktoria Weber
- Academic staff: 387 (as of 2025)
- Administrative staff: 383 (as of 2025)
- Total staff: 770 (as of 2025)
- Students: 7,376 (as of 2025)
- Location: Krems an der Donau, Lower Austria, Austria
- Campus: Urban
- Website: www.donau-uni.ac.at

The University for Continuing Education Krems (German: Universität für Weiterbildung Krems) is an Austrian university specializing in further education for working professionals. It is located in Krems an der Donau, Lower Austria.

== Name ==
The Austrian Ministry of Education, Science and Research calls the university the Danube University Krems in English and the Legal Information System of the Republic of Austria calls the university the University of Continuing Education Krems in the English translation of the Universities Act 2002.

== History ==
The first 93 students enrolled in 1995, when the institution began operation with programs in European Studies and journalism. In 2004, the Austrian parliament passed the Danube University Act (DUK-Gesetz) granting the institution the rights of a full university (such as appointing its own professors). In 2019, the University for Continuing Education Krems was fully incorporated as a public university into the Universities Act 2002 (UG 2002). The University for Continuing Education Krems Act ceased to be in force, while the institution’s specialization in postgraduate university programmes remained unchanged. More than 32,000 students have graduated from the university.

== Students ==
More than 7,500 students (average age: 39 years) from over 100 countries study at the university. 26 percent of the students come from foreign countries.

== Campus ==
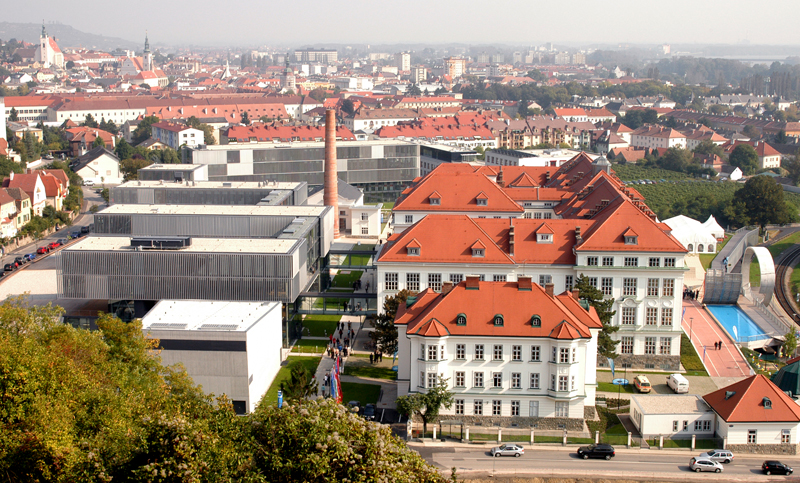
Campus Krems

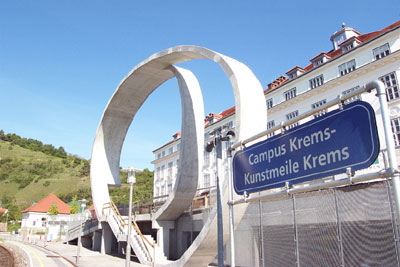
Railway station at Campus Krems

The University for Continuing Education Krems is in the Wachau region along the Danube. The architect of the new buildings was Dietmar Feichtinger.
