= China-EU School of Law =

International law school in China

- 中欧法学院
- Type: Law school, Public
- Established: 2008
- Dean: Liu Fei, Monty Silley and Bengt Lundell
- Location: Beijing, China
- Website: www.cesl.edu.cn

The China-EU School of Law (CESL; Chinese: 中欧法学院) at the China University of Political Science and Law is an international law school primarily located in Beijing, China. CESL was founded on the basis of an agreement between the European Community and the government of the People's Republic of China. It is the only Sino-foreign law school accredited in China. The current Co-Deans are Liu Fei, Bengt Lundell and Monty Silley.

== History ==
The precursor to CESL was the "EU-China Legal and Judicial Cooperation Programme", which ran from 2000 to 2005. The former Chinese Minister of Justice, Zhang Fusen, first talked about the idea of creating a Sino-European law school in 2003. The head of the Delegation of the European Commission to China, Serge Abou, also promoted this idea to the European Community. In 2007 Chinese Foreign Minister Li Zhaoxing, Chinese Vice Minister of Commerce and current Deputy Director General of the WTO, Yi Xiaozhun, and EU Commissioner for External Relations Benita Ferrero-Waldner signed a financing agreement on behalf of both the European Commission and the Chinese government to create a Sino-European law school. This law school was "meant to improve their understanding of each other's legal systems."

"CESL attracted a lot of attention even before its formal inauguration." Prior to CESL's establishment, Premier Wen Jiabao expressed that "CESL will educate a great many talented legal professionals with knowledge of both Chinese and Western laws." The European Commission stated that CESL "will address Governance Capacity-building by improving the knowledge, skills and performance of the Chinese legal profession in relation to European and international law" and will "contribute to rule of law in China by offering to the entire range of legal professionals high quality legal education in EU and international law and practical legal skills."

The inauguration ceremony of the China-EU School of Law was held on October 23, 2008, and attended by then Chinese Vice Premier, now Premier, Li Keqiang and European Commission President Jose Manuel Barroso. The Asia Times stated that CESL's establishment was a sign of "the degree of China's openness".

The UK House of Lords considered that "the creation of the China-EU School of Law (CESL) in 2008 was the first attempt to institutionalise legal cooperation" between China and the West. CESL was the first law school in China approved by the Ministry of Education of the People's Republic of China under the Sino-foreign jointly administered schools agreement.

CESL's purpose is to create a platform for European scholars and students to understand Chinese law, for Chinese legal scholars and students to understand the European and international legal systems, as well as to support the Chinese Government in its effort to develop a society based on the rule of law. European Commission President Jose Manuel Barroso stated "of course there are hundreds of law schools in China. But this one has a special mission. It will be international and European, and it is committed to the pursuit of excellence through the quality of its students and its professors."

== Consortium ==
CESL is based on a Sino-European consortium, consisting of thirteen European universities, two Chinese Universities, and the Chinese National Prosecutors College. "China-EU School of Law partners belong to the best universities worldwide." These include: the China University of Political Science and Law (China), the University of Hamburg (Germany), Tsinghua University (China), KU Leuven (Belgium), Maastricht University (Netherlands), Trinity College Dublin (Ireland), the Autonomous University of Madrid (Spain), the University of Bologna (Italy), Lund University (Sweden), Central European University (Hungary), Jagiellonian University (Poland), the University of Manchester (UK), the University of Strasbourg (France), the Vienna University of Economics and Business (Austria), Eötvös Loránd University (Hungary), and the National Prosecutors College (China).

These partners provide teaching staff and co-financing. The consortium is co-ordinated by the University of Hamburg. CESL also has the official status of a department or school of the China University of Political Science and Law, itself "one of China's highest-ranking universities in the field of law."

== Reputation ==
Considered one of the best law schools in Asia, and perhaps the best in China, CESL is very well regarded. It is the leading institution to study European and international law in China, as well as to learn Chinese law in English. The Asian Correspondent recognized the School as being "geared to educate the best of legal minds that practice within the framework of Sino-European relations." Nicolas Chapuis, Ambassador of the European Union to China said "CESL has proven to be a center of excellence in legal education. It also has created a unique platform for exchange between Chinese and European students, scholars and legal practitioners."

Since CESL "attracts the best talent from China and Europe" it has been called "a rising star in China's legal education" and rankings confirm "CESL is a top School in Asia." The Shanghai Cooperation Organisation called CESL "one of the country's best universities providing legal training."

CESL's underlying partnership is composed of many top law schools in both Europe and China. "Eleven belong to the best universities in the world according to the 2018 QS World University Ranking." It is also integrated as one of the graduate schools of the China University of Political Science and Law (CUPL), which is "one of the most highly rated academic legal institutions in China." Graduates of CESL's Chinese law masters and doctorate programmes are conferred a degree by the CUPL which "especially in the field of law, [is] among the best universities in China" and in 2018 was ranked number 1 for law studies in China by CUCAS, the official Chinese University and College Admission System, as well as other rankings. Monika Auweter-Kurtz, President of the University of Hamburg, noted that CESL has an "unrivalled position in the global sphere of higher education."

With strong support from both the European Community and the People's Republic of China, "the China-EU School of Law is regarded as one of the biggest EU educational projects in China." The EU Ambassador to China, Nicolas Chapuis, stated that "the China-EU School of Law is the flagship of European-Chinese cooperation." European Commission President, José Manuel Barroso, has also identified CESL as the "flagship of our strategic partnership" between China and the EU. He recognised "this law school is committed to the pursuit of excellence through the quality of its students and its professors." He also compared CESL with the top-ranked China Europe International Business School and said CESL "should aim to be the best". The German Minister of Justice, Brigitte Zypries, said "the founding of the China-Europe School of Law represents a project of enormous importance to Germany."

== Professional training programmes ==
CESL is "a law school for Chinese and European jurists at all stages of their professional life." It provides professional training programmes for Chinese judges and prosecutors, Chinese and European lawyers, and other legal professionals. CESL works with the Chinese National Judges College and the Chinese National Prosecutors College to train judges and prosecutors respectively. Lawyers training is organized either wholly by CESL or in cooperation with lawyers associations. Over 9,000 professionals have participated in 90 different training courses offered so far.

== Research and consultancy ==
The objectives of research and consultancy at CESL are to contribute to the legal transformation process in China and the research efforts of the Sino-European academic community. CESL supports research in all areas related to China-European legal matters. This includes legal and administrative transformation in China, China and Europe in a globalizing world, comparative business and commercial law, as well as legal theory, law and culture. CESL is very active in bringing legal scholars and practitioners together to analyze legal developments, exchange ideas, and advise policymakers on best practices. The School has organised over 50 conferences and workshops. In addition, over 150 scholars have been involved in 35 specific research projects. In total, over 1,400 scholars have participated in CESL workshops, conferences and special projects.

In 2011, CESL also created the Institute for Legal Philosophy and Interdisciplinary Research of Law (LPI). This is led by Prof. Zheng Yongliu, ranked by China Today as one of "China's 100 most influential legal scholars."

== Employment statistics ==
CESL surveys the employment statistics for each year's graduates. The School has maintained very high post-graduate employment, with virtually all graduates securing job offers by graduation. The employment statistics of every class year has exceeded 90%. "In the past five years, between 93 and 100% of the China-EU School of Law's graduates found employment in the legal sector or pursued further study within three months after graduating."

Basically "all graduates find work – mostly in law firms". The latest employment statistics showed that within 3 months of graduation over 95% of CESL graduates were either working as lawyers or doing further masters/PhD studies. The majority of graduates join large law firms (41%), followed by jobs in the public sector (27%), in the legal department of financial institutions (13%), or as in-house counsel for other types of companies (6%), and the remaining (8%) pursue further studies.

It has been said that "China-EU School of Law students have a big advantage. With their international education, they already have their foot in the door of international law firms or law firms practicing international legal matters." Michael Westhagemann, the past CEO of Siemens AG, said "graduates of CESL who have learned to structurally analyse both Chinese and EU legal issues meet our demands excellently." The Delegation of the EU to China has found that "all of [the graduates of the master programmes are] now working in elevated legal positions in China and Europe." Multiple CESL alumni are included amongst China's "leading legal talents" including two being listed in China's "Top 30 under 30".

== Notable professors ==
- Florence Benoît-Rohmer – Professor at the University of Strasbourg, past Dean of the Faculty of Law at Robert Schuman University, human rights expert and past Secretary General of the European Inter-University Centre for Human Rights and Democratisation
- Ninon Colneric – Former Co-Dean of CESL and former judge at the European Court of Justice
- Stéphanie Balme – Dean of Sciences Po and expert in Sino-European comparative law
- Matthias Storme – Professor at University of Leuven and the University of Antwerp, lawyer and conservative philosopher
- Geert Van Calster – Belgian legal scholar and Professor at KU Leuven
- Csongor István Nagy – Hungarian legal scholar and Head of the Department of Private International Law at the University of Szeged
- Attila Menyhárd – Hungarian legal scholar and Head of the Faculty of Law at Eötvös Loránd University
- Peter Van den Bossche – Appellate Judge of the WTO and Professor at Maastricht University

== Publications ==
- The China-EU Law Journal

CESL has produced 18 books and over 75 articles have been published in the China-EU Law Journal.
