= Timeline of the COVID-19 pandemic in Scotland =

Timeline of the COVID-19 pandemic in Scotland may refer to:

- Timeline of the COVID-19 pandemic in Scotland (2020)
- Timeline of the COVID-19 pandemic in Scotland (2021)
- Timeline of the COVID-19 pandemic in Scotland (2022)
