= Timeline of the COVID-19 pandemic in Scotland (2020) =

Daily Scottish events related to the 2020 pandemic

The following is a timeline of the COVID-19 pandemic in Scotland during 2020. There are significant differences in the legislation and the reporting between the countries of the UK: England, Scotland, Northern Ireland, and Wales.

== Timeline ==
=== January 2020 ===
- 24 January – Five people were tested for COVID-19 in Scotland, all returning negative as an incident team was established for the disease.

=== February 2020 ===
- 10 February – 57 tests had been conducted (all negatives), a figure which rose to 412 by 25 February.
- 22 February – COVID-19 was made into a "notifiable disease", and a surveillance network involving 41 GP locations was established to submit samples of suspected patients, even if they had no travel history.
- 26/27 February – There is a coronavirus outbreak at a Nike conference in Edinburgh from which at least 25 people linked to the event are thought to have contracted the virus, including 8 residents of Scotland. Health Protection Scotland establishes an incident management team, and full contact tracing is done for delegates who have tested positive.
- 29 February – Scotland's Chief Medical Officer, Catherine Calderwood announces that surveillance will begin at some hospitals and 41 GP surgeries in Scotland.

=== March 2020 ===
- 1 March – Authorities confirm the first case of coronavirus in Scotland.
- 2 March – It is reported that Health Protection Scotland was alerted by international authorities about a person, not from the UK, who tested positive after the Nike conference in late February. The public were not told.
- 3 March – First person from the Nike conference tests positive. Public still not informed, but Scottish Ministers are now told.
- 4 March – Two further cases are confirmed, one having travelled from Italy and the other having had contact with a known carrier.
- 5 March – Three further cases are confirmed, taking the total to five cases.
- 6 March – The number of confirmed cases double to 11.
- 9 March – Cases have more than doubled again to 23 cases out of 2,101 tests conducted.
- 11 March – First case of community transmission which wasn't linked to travel or confirmed cases.
- 13 March – Authorities confirm the first death from coronavirus in Scotland.
- 16 March – 171 cases have been confirmed from 4,895 tests, with positive cases being reported by all health boards of NHS Scotland except in NHS Orkney and NHS Western Isles.
- 20 March – The Scottish Government tells cafes, pubs, and restaurants to close. (Note: Also told to close are nightclubs and other drinking establishments, Cinemas, theatres and bingo halls and concert halls, Spas, wellness centres and massage parlours, Casinos and betting shops, and Indoor leisure facilities such as gyms and swimming pools.)
- 23 March – With the UK death toll hitting 335 deaths and 14 in Scotland, Boris Johnson announced a nationwide "Stay at Home" order would come into effect as of midnight and it would be reviewed every 3 weeks. Scotland's Chief Medical Officer Catherine Calderwood said, "This is no longer a rehearsal for something that might happen." This would become known as the UK lockdown.
- 24 March –
  - 16 patients with confirmed cases of COVID-19 had died.
  - The Scottish Parliament closes, with plans to reconvene on 1 April to discuss emergency legislation.
- 25 March – The First Minister confirms that the Scottish Government will establish a COVID-19 Advisory Group to supplement the advice it receives from the UK-wide Scientific Advisory Group for Emergencies. It will be chaired by Professor Andrew Morris of Edinburgh University, the Director of Health Research UK, with support from vice chair David Crossman, Dean of Medicine at the University of St Andrews and Chief Scientific Advisor for Health at the Scottish Government.
- 26 March – It is announced that 25 deaths have been reported, with 896 confirmed cases in Scotland.
- 28 March – Alister Jack, the Secretary of State for Scotland, announces that he is self-isolating after experiencing coronavirus symptoms.

=== April 2020 ===
- 1 April –
  - Confirmed cases of COVID-19 pass 2,000 across the country, with 76 deaths in hospitals. The Scottish Government announces 3,500 tests a day by the end of the month and construction starts at the SEC in Glasgow to become NHS Louisa Jordan, a 300-bed capacity hospital, but expandable to 1,000 if required.
  - The 2020 Edinburgh festivals, planned for August, are cancelled.
- 5 April – Catherine Calderwood, Scotland's chief medical officer, resigns from her post after it emerged she had been spoken to by police for visiting her second home during lockdown.
- 6 April – The Coronavirus (Scotland) Act 2020, introduced as an Emergency Bill in the Scottish Parliament on 31 March, gains Royal Assent, becoming law.
- 7 April – The Scottish Government announces that 12,000 nursing and midwifery students from across the country and returning workers who had worked in the Health and Social Care sector have signed up to join the NHS workforce to help fight COVID-19, Chief Nursing Officer Fiona McQueen says, "I want to thank each and every student who has volunteered their support so far." In addition, 2,000 final year students had already joined the workforce since the call for help was sent out.
- 11 April – Occupancy of critical care beds in England peaks at around 58% of capacity. Occupancy in the month of April for Scotland and Wales will only briefly exceed 40%, while Northern Ireland reported a peak of 51% early in the month.
- 16 April – After reviewing the lockdown with all nations in the UK, the decision is made to extend it for another three weeks until 7 May.
- 20 April –
  - Prof Dame Angela Maclean, the UK's deputy chief scientific adviser, says the number of confirmed cases is "flattening out". The number of people in hospital for COVID-19 has begun to fall in Scotland, Wales and every region of England, with significant falls in London and the Midlands.
  - NHS Louisa Jordan in Glasgow opens as confirmed cases pass 8,400 with 915 fatalities in hospitals.
- 22 April – The National Records of Scotland (NRS) releases data up to 19 April. The number of deaths in Scotland was up 80% above the 5-year average. 537 deaths had been recorded in care homes, double the number of the previous week, 910 deaths had been recorded in hospitals, and 168 deaths in homes or other settings. Public Health Scotland's daily figures were under-counting deaths by up to 40%. (Note: Deaths in Scotland with COVID-19 mentioned as a cause: 910 in hospitals (57%); 537 in care homes (33%); 168 in homes and other settings (10%)) as it was reporting deaths in hospitals only.
- 23 April – As the Scottish Government publishes details of a strategy for ending lockdown, Nicola Sturgeon, the First Minister of Scotland, says the lifting of restrictions in Scotland is "likely to be phased" with some measures remaining in place until 2021 "and beyond".
- 25 April – Confirmed cases surpass 10,000.
- 28 April – *The Scottish Government recommends people cover their faces while in some public places such as shops and on public transport.

=== May 2020 ===
- 7 May –
  - Confirmed cases of COVID-19 pass 11,500 across the country, with 1,515 deaths in hospitals. The Scottish Government announces that it had reached its testing goal of 3,500 tests a day in NHS labs laid out in April with 4,661 tests carried out on 30 April. They also announce that their next target is 8,000 tests a day in NHS labs across Scotland by Mid-May.
  - Nicola Sturgeon extends the lockdown restrictions in Scotland for another three weeks, but says they could be changed if there is evidence it is safe to do so.
- 8 May – First Minister Nicola Sturgeon reports that there is some recognition that each of the four nations of the UK might move at different speeds with regard to loosening the lockdown and that she will not be pressured into lifting restrictions prematurely.
- 10 May –
  - The UK government updates its coronavirus message from "stay at home, protect the NHS, save lives" to "stay alert, control the virus, save lives". The Opposition Labour Party expresses concern the slogan could be confusing, and leaders of the devolved governments in Scotland, Wales and Northern Ireland say they will keep the original slogan.
  - Nicola Sturgeon removes the once-a-day outdoors exercise limit in Scotland starting from the following day.
- 11 May –
  - In a national address to Scotland at the beginning of the seventh week of lockdown, Nicola Sturgeon asks the nation "to stick with lockdown for a bit longer – so that we can consolidate our progress, not jeopardise it[...] I won't risk unnecessary deaths by acting rashly or prematurely." This marks the moment when the four nations of the UK begin to take different approaches to handling lockdown restrictions.
  - The public are made aware of the Nike conference outbreak by an edition of the documentary series BBC Disclosure.
- 18 May –
  - First Minister of Scotland Nicola Sturgeon sets out plans to begin easing Scotland's lockdown restrictions from 28 May.
  - Anyone aged 5 or over, presenting symptoms of COVID-19, becomes eligible to get tested, while Anosmia is added to the COVID-19 symptom list.
  - Celtic are declared Scottish champions for the ninth season in a row while Hearts are relegated after the Scottish Professional Football League ends the 2019–20 season early because of the COVID-19 outbreak.
- 19 May – More information about the Nike conference comes out from the BBC and Sky News, showing that none of the people the Nike delegates were in contact with were approached for testing or support, including 20 Lloyd's Banking Group employees they shared facilities with. The Nike delegates were taken on a walking tour of Edinburgh, the tour guides were not traced, tested or informed.
- 21 May – First Minister of Scotland Nicola Sturgeon outlines a four-phase "route map" for easing lockdown restrictions in Scotland that will include allowing people to meet up outside with people from one other household in the first phase. The lockdown will be eased from 28 May subject to the number of new cases of COVID-19 continuing to fall. Schools in Scotland will reopen on 11 August, when students will receive a "blended model" of part-time study at school combined with some learning at home.
- 24 May – Two Dutch employees attended the Nike conference, one of whom is believed to have been the cause of the shutdown of the HQ in the Netherlands. The Nike conference is proven to have started the outbreak in the North-East of England, as one of the delegates was infected and went to a birthday party and infected more people.
- 26 May –
  - The Scottish Government announces plans for Test and Protect, a track and trace system.
  - Douglas Ross resigns as a junior minister with the Scotland Office over the UK government's defence of Dominic Cummings, while at least 35 Conservative MPs call for Cummings to be removed from his post.
- 27 May – It is reported that 10 Nike delegates from the conference were taken for a kilt fitting, during which a woman fitting the kilts was infected by them.
- 28 May –
  - Contact tracing systems go live in England and Scotland – NHS Test and Trace in England, and Test and Protect in Scotland. However, Dido Harding tells MPs the system in England will not be "fully operational at a local level" until the end of June.
  - First Minister of Scotland Nicola Sturgeon announces an easing of lockdown measures in Scotland from the following day, when people from two different households can meet up outdoors as long as they are groups of eight or less.
- 29 May – Lockdown measures are eased in Scotland.

=== June 2020 ===
- 7 June – *No new deaths are recorded for Scotland or Northern Ireland over the most recent 24 hour period; it is the first time Scotland has recorded no new deaths since lockdown began in March.
- 8 June – No deaths are reported in Scotland for a second consecutive day.
- 13 June – The Scottish Retail Consortium urges the Scottish Government to set a provisional date for the reopening of non-essential shops.
- 18 June – First Minister Nicola Sturgeon announces the next phase of easing the lockdown restrictions in Scotland. People living alone or single parents with children can form what is described as an "extended group" with one other household from 19 June, enabling them to stay overnight, while up to three households can meet up outdoors. Face coverings will become compulsory on public transport from 22 June, and most shops are being allowed to reopen from 29 June.
- 19 June – As Scotland enters the second phase of its road map to ease lockdown restrictions, the Scottish Government replaces its "stay at home" message with "stay safe".
- 21 June –
  - No new COVID-19 deaths are recorded for Scotland and Northern Ireland.
  - NHS Test and Protect, Scotland's contact tracing service, is to send out leaflets to every household in Scotland explaining how the system works, and what people should do if they develop COVID-19 symptoms.
- 22 June – The wearing of face coverings becomes compulsory on public transport in Scotland, with exemptions made for children under five and people with certain medical conditions. Dentists are allowed to reopen for patients in need of urgent treatment, and health services are expanded again. Places of worship in Scotland can also reopen for individual prayer.
- 23 June – Scottish Education Minister John Swinney confirms that schools in Scotland will return full-time in August providing the coronavirus continues to be suppressed.
- 24 June – First Minister Nicola Sturgeon announces major changes to the lockdown restrictions in Scotland. These include allowing people to meet indoors with two other households from 10 July, and reopening pubs and restaurants, holiday accommodation, and hairdressers from 15 July. The two metre social distancing rule stays in place for Scotland.
- 26 June – Scotland records no deaths or new cases of COVID-19 for the most recent 24 hour period, prompting First Minister Nicola Sturgeon to predict that Scotland is "not far away" from eliminating the virus.
- 27 June – Travel companies report that holiday bookings have "exploded" since the UK government announced plans to ease quarantine restrictions on travel abroad. But Scotland says it is yet to decide on the matter. Although the UK government has authority over border control, the Scottish government must be consulted on quarantine in Scotland because health matters in Scotland are devolved to the Scottish government.
- 28 June – Following two days with no reported deaths in Scotland, Professor Devi Sridhar, an expert in public health at Edinburgh University, suggests that Scotland could eradicate COVID-19 by the end of the summer.
- 29 June – Non essential retailers reopen in Scotland.

=== July 2020 ===
- 2 July – First Minister Nicola Sturgeon announces that the wearing of face coverings will become mandatory in shops in Scotland from 10 July.
- 3 July –
  - The UK Government published a list of 59 countries for which quarantine will not apply when arriving back in England as from 10 July. They include Greece, France, Belgium and Spain, but Portugal and the United States are among those not on the list. These changes do not apply to Scotland, Wales or Northern Ireland, where quarantine restrictions remain in place for all arrivals from outside the UK.
  - Scotland lifts its five-mile travel restriction, and also allows the use of self-contained holiday accommodation.
- 5 July – Jeane Freeman, Scotland's Cabinet Secretary for Health and Sport, says that no quarantine checks have been carried out on passengers arriving in Scotland from overseas because officials did not have security clearance to access the details of passengers. With security checks on staff now completed, they are scheduled to begin within days.
- 6 July –
  - As concerns about increasing unemployment grow, the UK government announces a £111m scheme to help firms in England provide an extra 30,000 trainee places; £21m will be provided to fund similar schemes in Scotland, Wales and Northern Ireland.
  - Beer gardens and pavement cafes are reopened in Scotland after fifteen weeks of lockdown.
- 8 July – In a break with the UK government's list of countries exempt from quarantine restrictions, the Scottish Government announces that passengers arriving from Spain and Serbia will still have to quarantine for 14 days on arrival in Scotland.
- 9 July –
  - Scottish First Minister Nicola Sturgeon announces that people in Scotland will be able to meet up indoors with two other households from 10 July, and also in extended groups outside of up to fifteen from the same day. Shopping centres will reopen from 13 July, and hairdressers and barbers, as well as the indoor areas of bars and restaurants, from 15 July.
  - The majority of gates to Glasgow's Kelvingrove Park are to be locked over the summer to prevent large gatherings, and following problems with anti-social behaviour in the park during lockdown.
- 10 July –
  - As the wearing of face coverings becomes mandatory in shops in Scotland, the UK Government considers whether to introduce the same rule for shops in England, while Prime Minister Boris Johnson is seen in public wearing one.
  - The Scottish Government gives the Scottish Football Association permission to launch the 2020–21 Scottish Premiership on 1 August.
- 11 July – The number of new COVID-19 cases in Scotland has fallen to single figures after seven people tested positive in the most recent 24-hour period; there were also no new COVID deaths in Scotland over the same period.
- 13 July – Shopping centres are permitted to reopen in Scotland, while outdoor contact sports resume for children.
- 15 July –
  - Hairdressers and barbers, pubs and restaurants, cinemas, tourist attractions, places of worship and childcare facilities reopen in Scotland in what First Minister Nicola Sturgeon describes as "the biggest step so far" in easing its lockdown restrictions.
  - Scotland records its seventh consecutive day without any COVID-19 hospital deaths, and also had three days with no admissions to hospital from the virus in the week ending 12 July. Since 26 June there have been six days without a hospital admission.
- 16 July –
  - First Minister of Scotland Nicola Sturgeon announces changes to lockdown rules for those who are shielding, effective from 17 July. From that date they can visit holiday accommodation, as well as outdoor markets and gardens.
  - Research carried out by the health service in Scotland in a sample of 4,751 samples between April and June seems to suggest that less than 5% of Scots have had COVID-19.
- 18 July – Scotland experiences its biggest daily rise in COVID-19 cases since 21 June, with 21 cases reported over the most recent 24 hours, eight of them in the Glasgow and Clyde area.
- 19 July –
  - Another 23 new COVID-19 cases are recorded for Scotland, but there are no further deaths.
  - Health officials confirm they are investigating a potential cluster of COVID-19 cases linked to a call centre in Lanarkshire that carries out contact-tracing for Public Health England.
- 20 July –
  - Six people are reported to have tested positive for COVID-19 at the call centre outbreak, identified at a Sitel site in Motherwell, and an investigation is under way.
  - Scotland lifts quarantine restrictions for people arriving from Spain.
- 21 July –
  - A further 22 new cases of COVID-19 are reported in Scotland, 14 of which are linked to the Lanarkshire call centre outbreak.
  - The Scottish Government announces a 2.8% above-inflation pay rise for NHS medical and dental workers backdated to 1 April.
- 22 July –
  - Figures released by the National Records of Scotland show COVID deaths have fallen to their lowest level since the beginning of the pandemic, with six deaths mentioning the virus during the week ending 19 July. This compares to more than 600 per week during the height of the pandemic in April 2020.
  - Five local businesses, including pubs and cafes, are linked to the call centre COVID outbreak in Lanarkshire.
  - Children under the age of five with COVID symptoms become eligible for testing; previously a test was only carried out if there was a "pressing clinical need" for it.
- 23 July –
  - The 2020 Great Scottish Run, scheduled for 4 October, is cancelled because of the COVID-19 pandemic.
  - The Scottish Government announces funding for 850 new teaching jobs and 200 support staff to help schools reopen on 11 August.
  - The Scottish Government apologises to funfair owners after giving out incorrect advice that they could reopen on 15 July after they were subsequently forced to close again.
- 24 July – No new COVID deaths are reported in Scotland, but there are 20 new cases of the virus.
- 26 July –
  - Quarantine restrictions are reimposed on travellers arriving from Spain following a spike in COVID-19 cases in Spain.
  - Four new cases of COVID-19 are recorded in Scotland, but there are no deaths for the tenth day in a row.
- 27 July – First Minister Nicola Sturgeon announces that the temporary hospital, NHS Louisa Jordan is to be used to help clear a backlog of outpatient appointments delayed by the COVID-19 pandemic following a successful trial with a small group of outpatient visitors.
- 29 July –
  - A possible COVID-19 cluster is being investigated in Glasgow following 14 new cases in the city.
  - The Scottish Government announces a hotel recovery programme worth £14m, designed to support the tourist industry until Summer 2021.
- 30 July –
  - First Minister Nicola Sturgeon gives schools the go-ahead to reopen on 11 August, with all pupils expected to be in class full-time from 18 August.
  - Sturgeon sets a provisional date for gyms, swimming pools and indoor sports venues to reopen on 14 September, but says she will review the situation in three weeks to see if the date can be brought forward. The same date is also set for the return of spectator sporting events.
  - Sturgeon confirms the shielding programme will be paused on 1 August.
  - The Office for Statistics Regulation criticises Sturgeon for comments she made in which she claimed COVID-19 rates were five times higher in England than Scotland.
  - Luxembourg is added to the list of countries from where travellers arriving into Scotland must quarantine for 14 days following a rise in cases there, with the rule coming into force from midnight.
- 31 July –
  - 30 new COVID-19 cases are recorded in Scotland, the highest daily rise since 4 June, but no COVID-related deaths are recorded for the fifteenth consecutive day.
  - The Scottish Government warns people against visiting areas of England subject to lockdown rules, after measures were imposed in Greater Manchester, East Lancashire and West Yorkshire.
  - Edinburgh Airport announces plans to make a third of its 750-strong workforce redundant because of impact of the COVID-19 pandemic.

=== August 2020 ===
- 1 August –
  - The shielding programme is paused for England and Scotland, but will continue for the areas where extra precautions have been introduced.
  - 18 new COVID-19 cases are recorded, a drop of 12 from the previous day.
  - The three most popular Historic Environment Scotland visitor attractions – Edinburgh Castle, Stirling Castle and Urquhart Castle – are reopened to the public, but will a reduced footfall capacity.
  - As the 2020–21 Scottish Premiership season begins police urge fans to stay away from match venues.
- 2 August – Health officials announce they are investigating a cluster of 13 COVID-19 cases linked to a pub in Aberdeen.
- 4 August –
  - Secondary school students receive their Higher grades. Having been unable to take their exams because of the pandemic, their grades have been estimated by teachers, but the body awarding the qualifications is reported to have downgraded around a quarter of the marks awarded in order to "maintain credibility".
  - The number of COVID-19 cases linked to the Aberdeen cluster rises to 32.
- 5 August – Lockdown restrictions are reimposed on Aberdeen after the number of cases in the city rises to 54. Pubs and restaurants are required to close by 5pm, and travel restrictions to and from the city come into force.
- 6 August – The number of COVID-19 cases in Aberdeen rises to 79.
- 7 August –
  - First Minister Nicola Sturgeon extends the list of places where the wearing of face coverings is required to include libraries, museums and places of worship, with effect from the following day. She also announces the collection of contact tracing details will become mandatory for the hospitality industry from the following week.
  - A further 43 cases are recorded in Scotland, with the number of cases linked to Aberdeen standing at 101. They include two Aberdeen F.C. players who tested positive from a group of eight who attended a night club the previous weekend.
- 8 August – A further 60 COVID-19 cases are reported in Scotland, including 39 in the NHS Grampian area which includes the city of Aberdeen.
- 9 August – Ministers announce a relaxing of rules for care home visits from the following day that allows three outdoor visitors per person from two separate households.
- 10 August –
  - First Minister Nicola Sturgeon apologises for the exam results controversy, saying the Scottish Government "did not get it right".
  - A Royal Bank of Scotland survey finds the private sector Scottish economy is "approaching stabilisation" following the effects of lockdown.
  - A leading public sector leisure management facility warns that leisure centres in the public sector are facing closure because of the impact of the pandemic.
- 11 August –
  - The Scottish Government agrees to upgrade thousands of exam results following controversy over their marking, and accept teachers' estimates of pupils' results.
  - Pupils in Scotland return to school for the first time since March.
- 12 August – First Minister Nicola Sturgeon announces that lockdown measures will remain in place in Aberdeen. Cases have fallen since it was implemented, but are still higher than in other areas.
- 13 August – First Minister Nicola Sturgeon warns that COVID-19 cases in Scotland may be increasing again following a series of clusters in Orkney, Glasgow and Aberdeenshire.
- 14 August –
  - The Scottish Professional Football League begins disciplinary action against Aberdeen and Celtic over breaches of COVID-19 protocol.
  - Authorities announce that anyone in the Grampian region identified as a close contact of someone testing positive for COVID-19 will be offered a test, regardless of whether or not they have symptoms.
- 15 August – A further 51 cases of COVID-19 are reported in Scotland, 25 of them in the NHS Grampian region.
- 16 August –
  - The Scottish Government has awarded the National Trust for Scotland £3.8m, enabling it to save 200 jobs.
  - A Sunday Post investigation reveals that at least 37 COVID patients have been transferred to care homes following a diagnosis in hospital.
- 18 August – The Scottish Qualifications Authority says that 75,000 new exam certificates will be issued following the grades controversy.
- 19 August – Lockdown measures in Aberdeen are extended for a further week. First Minister Nicola Sturgeon says the restrictions are having an impact, but it is "not yet safe" to lift them.
- 20 August –
  - Portugal is added to the UK's quarantine exemption list, while Croatia, Austria and Trinidad and Tobago are taken off it; Scotland also removes Switzerland from its own quarantine exemption list.
  - First Minister Nicola Sturgeon announces that gyms, swimming pools and indoor sports courts can reopen from 31 August.
- 22 August –
  - 123 new COVID-19 cases have been recorded in Scotland during the latest 24 hour period.
  - Students and staff at James Gillespie's High School in Edinburgh are told to wear face coverings while moving between classes from 24 August after pictures emerged on social media of crowded corridors.
- 23 August –
  - Lockdown restrictions in Aberdeen are partially lifted, with restrictions on travel and a ban on indoor gatherings lifted from 24 August, and bars and restaurants allowed to reopen from 26 August.
  - Scotland records an increase of 83 COVID-19 cases in the most recent 24 hours, including 37 in Tayside.
- 24 August –
  - The Scottish Government announces it is in the "final stages" of consultation to introduce the wearing of face coverings for students at secondary schools to be worn while moving between lessons.
  - A total of 27 COVID-19 cases have been linked to a school in Dundee, most of them among staff at the school.
- 25 August –
  - The Scottish Government announces that school pupils will be required to wear face coverings in school corridors, communal areas and on school buses from Monday 31 August.
  - Filming recommences on BBC Scotland's soap River City.
- 26 August – Scotland records two COVID-19 deaths, the first daily deaths to be recorded since 16 July.
- 27 August – First Minister Nicola Sturgeon announces that 17,500 COVID tests were carried out on children across Scotland during the past week, with 49 testing positive.
- 28 August –
  - A new law comes into force giving police the power to break up house parties involving more than fifteen people.
  - First Minister Nicola Sturgeon announces that the Scottish Government has been holding talks with business leaders about a phased return to offices, but says she does not want to see people intimidated into returning to work.
- 29 August – Scotland records its second highest number of daily COVID-19 cases since the end of May with a further 88 documented in the most recent 24 hours.
- 30 August – A further 123 COVID cases are recorded, giving Scotland its highest number of new cases over 48 hours since 22 May. The news comes as the number of tests reaches a record level.
- 31 August –
  - First Minister Nicola Sturgeon expresses her concern after a further 160 people test positive for COVID-19.
  - Face coverings become mandatory for Scottish secondary schools.
  - Gyms, swimming pools and indoor sports courts are permitted to reopen.

=== September 2020 ===
- 1 September –
  - Figures released by the Scottish Government show school attendance down to 84.5%, with 100,000 pupils absent from the classroom.
  - Restrictions on visiting other households are reintroduced in Glasgow and the neighbouring areas of West Dunbartonshire and East Renfrewshire following a rise in COVID-19 cases.
  - The Scottish Government announces that travellers from Greece to Scotland will be required to quarantine from 4 am on 3 September.
- 2 September –
  - Health officials find evidence of COVID-19 transmission in two schools in Glasgow.
  - Deputy First Minister John Swinney defends the Scottish Government's decision to allow pubs to remain open in Glasgow following the introduction of stricter lockdown measures in the city; Swinney says the virus is being spread by households rather than the hospitality sector.
  - The opposition Scottish Conservatives have warned that school pupils face being "taught less and learning less" as schools plan to cover less ground in key subjects like Maths and English, and they call for urgent action to prevent this.
- 3 September –
  - First Minister Nicola Sturgeon warns that COVID-19 is spreading again in Scotland as a further 101 new cases are confirmed, 53 of them in the Greater Glasgow area.
  - Scotland removes Portugal from its quarantine exemption list effective from 4 am on 5 September.
- 4 September – UK Transport Secretary Grant Shapps criticises the Scottish Government for imposing quarantine restrictions on Greece and Portugal, saying they "jumped the gun" over Greece and did not take into account all of the data when making their decision about Portugal.
- 5 September –
  - As an additional 141 COVID-19 cases contribute to the highest weekly rise since May, anti-lockdown protesters gather in Edinburgh for a demonstration against restrictions.
  - With cases rising in Lanarkshire, health officials warn that further restrictions could be imposed if they continue to increase.
- 6 September – A further 208 new cases are recorded for Scotland.
- 7 September –
  - After a further 146 COVID-19 cases are reported, First Minister Nicola Sturgeon says it may be necessary to "put the brakes" on the further easing of lockdown measures in Scotland.
  - Restrictions on home visits in the West of Scotland are extended to cover Renfrewshire and East Dunbartonshire.
- 8 September – A further 176 COVID-19 cases are reported in Scotland, with cases recorded in every mainland health board area.
- 9 September –
  - Figures released by National Records of Scotland (NRS) show that deaths between April and June 2020 increased by a third on other years, with 18,201 deaths recorded, 4,515 more than the five year average.
  - Scotland's outdoor education sector warns it faces being lost without financial support from the Scottish Government.
- 10 September –
  - The number of people permitted at social gatherings indoors and outdoors is reduced to six in a bid to stem the acceleration of COVID cases, while customers in pubs, restaurants and cafes will be required to wear face coverings when not eating. Planned changes scheduled for 14 September are postponed until 5 October, meaning theatres, live music venues, indoor soft play facilities and indoor contact sports will not open as originally planned.
  - Scotland's contact tracing app, Protect Scotland, becomes available for download, and by the following day has been downloaded 600,000 times. By 17 September 100 people have been told to self-isolate because of the app after coming into contact with someone who has tested positive for the virus.
- 11 September – Households in Lanarkshire are banned from mixing from midnight.
- 12 September – COVID-19 cases in Scotland reach a four month high with a further 221 daily cases reported.
- 13 September – Daily COVID-19 cases rise to 244.
- 14 September – First Minister Nicola Sturgeon says there are "very serious concerns" about COVID testing backlogs, and that she is seeking "urgent discussions" with UK government ministers about the issue.
- 15 September –
  - First Minister Nicola Sturgeon says she has had "constructive" talks with UK Health Secretary Matt Hancock about the virus testing backlog, and is confident the issue can be resolved.
  - Sturgeon suggests that "guising" – the Scottish version of Trick-or-treating – could be banned for Halloween 2020.
- 16 September –
  - Families from the group Care Home Relatives Scotland lobby MSPs for improvements to care home visiting arrangements, which they describe as "cruel".
  - National Records of Scotland publishes a breakdown of COVID-19 related deaths, showing that COVID was mentioned in 4,236 deaths since the beginning of the pandemic, with a peak of 108 on 9 April, and five deaths registered as COVID related in the week from 7–13 September. The total number of deaths for the same week was 1,056, five per cent higher than the average.
- 17 September –
  - Thailand and Singapore are added to the quarantine exemption list, meaning travellers arriving from there will no longer need to self-isolate. Slovenia and Guadeloupe are removed.
  - Eleven people test positive for COVID-19 following an outbreak of the virus at accommodation belonging to Edinburgh Napier University.
  - BBC Scotland says it will continue to broadcast Scottish Government briefings following criticism when, during the previous week, it announced that televised broadcasts would be based on "editorial merit".
- 18 September –
  - First Minister Nicola Sturgeon warns that "hard but necessary" decisions regarding restrictions may be required to prevent another full scale lockdown.
  - In response to Sturgeon's comments, University of St Andrews asks its students to observe a voluntary lockdown over the upcoming weekend by staying in their rooms as much as possible and avoiding mixing with others.
- 19 September – The number of daily COVID-19 cases in Scotland rises to 350, with three deaths also recorded.
- 20 September – Health secretary Jeane Freeman says that large fines for those who fail to self-isolate when told to do so are "under discussion".
- 21 September –
  - First Minister Nicola Sturgeon says that extra COVID restrictions will "almost certainly" be introduced in the next few days.
  - Aberdeen and Celtic are fined £30,000 by the Scottish Professional Football League after players from both clubs breached COVID-19 rules.
- 22 September – First Minister Nicola Sturgeon announces that the ban on visiting other households will be extended across Scotland from the following day. 10pm curfew on pubs and restaurants will follow from 25 September.
- 23 September –
  - Scotland records a further 486 daily cases. Nicola Sturgeon describes the figures as concerning, but says it is important to remember more tests are being carried out than at the peak of the pandemic.
  - 600 students at the University of Glasgow are self-isolating after a COVID-19 outbreak there involving at least 124 cases.
- 24 September –
  - Students at Scottish universities are advised not to visit pubs, restaurants and parties, and to socialise only with members of their accommodation in a bid to stem the spread of COVID-19.
  - The Scottish Government faces criticism that regulations for households mixing in self-catering holiday accommodation is confusing.
- 25 September –
  - Extra police patrols are introduced at weekends to ensure pubs, bars and restaurants adhere to the 10 pm curfew.
  - First Minister Nicola Sturgeon says that students are not to blame for the COVID-19 outbreak after some claimed they were being "singled out" because they were told not to visit pubs and restaurants.
- 26 September –
  - Scotland's National Clinical Director Jason Leitch says the COVID-19 pandemic is now "accelerating" after a further 700 cases were confirmed over the last 24 Hours.
  - The University of Glasgow gives its students a four-week rent rebate on their accommodation because of the COVID-19 pandemic.
- 27 September –
  - The Scottish Government issues new guidelines to students affected by COVID-19, including advice that they may visit their parents if there is a "reasonable excuse" such as a family emergency.
  - Figures published by Public Health Scotland indicate that the COVID-19 outbreak in Scotland is now being driven by infections among teenagers, with 43% of the infections reported on 24 September being among those aged 15–19.
  - Deputy First Minister John Swinney confirms contingency plans are under way for possible changes to the timetable for the 2021 Scottish Parliament election.
- 28 September – The Scottish Government issues advice to students that they may return home if they are struggling in student accommodation because of the COVID outbreak, but Education Minister Richard Lochhead says he does not expect a "mass exodus".
- 29 September – A pub near the University of Aberdeen is identified as being a common factor in a COVID outbreak at the university where 62 people have tested positive.
- 30 September – Seven COVID-19 deaths are reported in Scotland, the highest daily total since 17 June.

=== October 2020 ===
- 1 October –
  - Poland, Turkey and the Caribbean islands of Bonaire, St Eustatius and Saba are removed from the quarantine exemption list with effect from 4 am on 3 October, while the Azores and Madeira are added.
  - The Scottish Government reviews the COVID restrictions, but does not add any additional rules. First Minister Nicola Sturgeon says she will not hesitate to introduce tighter restrictions if they are needed to it.
  - SNP MP Margaret Ferrier makes a public statement apologising unreservedly for two breaches of COVID-19 regulations after travelling to Westminster while experiencing symptoms and attending parliament, then travelling home by train after a positive test. She is also suspended from the SNP.
- 2 October –
  - The Metropolitan Police launch an investigation into the actions of Margaret Ferrier.
  - A further 775 positive COVID cases are recorded, along with four deaths.
  - A match between Kilmarnock and Motherwell is called off after a number of the Kilmarnock side test positive for COVID-19, requiring the whole team to self-isolate.
  - Bus manufacturer Alexander Dennis announces 70 job losses, on top of 200 previously announced because of the impact of the COVID-19 pandemic.
- 3 October –
  - A further 764 COVID-19 cases are confirmed in Scotland with four deaths.
  - Speaking on BBC Radio Scotland, Scottish Football Association vice-president Mike Mulraney, suggests the delay in returning spectators to stadiums is "political, rather than clinical". His comments are supported by SPFL chief executive Neil Doncaster.
- 4 October – With a further 758 positive cases of COVID-19 confirmed, Deputy First Minister John Swinney warns that further restrictions may be put in place to tackle the virus.
- 5 October – As a further 697 cases of the COVID-19 are reported, with 218 people as inpatients and 22 in intensive care, the First Minister is set to meet advisers and ministers to discuss new measures, including the possibility of a two-week "circuit breaker" to stem the escalation of cases.
- 6 October – Police launch an investigation into why the principal and vice-chancellor of the University of Aberdeen made a trip to the Vale of Glamorgan in south Wales on 2 October; the area is the subject of a lockdown.
- 7 October –
  - As Scotland records more than 1,000 new COVID cases in a day, the Scottish Government announces that bars and restaurants in the Central Belt must close from 18:00 on 9 October, the closure remaining in place until 25 October; licensed premises in other areas can remain open for outdoor service only.
  - Education Secretary John Swinney announces the cancellation of National 5 exams for 2021, which will instead be replaced with teacher based assessment.
  - MSP Neil Findlay claims "shambolic" test and trace procedures have led to a COVID outbreak at a care home in West Lothian involving at least 50 people.
- 8 October –
  - First Minister Nicola Sturgeon confirms that all cafes in Scotland can remain open through the tighter restrictions period, including licences premises providing they do not sell alcohol.
  - Deputy First Minister John Swinney and National Clinical Director Jason Leitch warn that tighter COVID restrictions could mean a return to supermarket queues of the type seen in the early stages of lockdown.
- 9 October – At 6 pm, pubs and restaurants begin their two-week closure.
- 10 October –
  - Restrictions are imposed at Glasgow's Barlinnie Prison after four members of staff and two prisoners test positive for COVID-19.
  - Tonnes of unused ice cubes are dumped outside the Scottish Parliament by bar and restaurant workers in protest at new COVID-19 restrictions.
  - An outbreak of coronavirus at the Redmill Care Home in West Lothian has caused the deaths of seven residents with another 32 residents and 25 members of staff also testing positive for COVID-19.
  - Christie and Co, the main agent for the purchase and sale of pubs, says that pubs are being given a lower market value because their price is being based on profits during the COVID-19 pandemic.
- 11 October –
  - Fergus Ewing, the Cabinet Secretary for Rural Economy and Tourism, warns there is "no guarantee" pubs will reopen on 25 October.
  - A further 956 new cases of COVID-19 are recorded, the first time the figure has dropped below 1,000 in five days.
- 12 October –
  - The Scottish Government announces plans to draw up a three-tier COVID restrictions system similar to the one announced for England.
  - The rules for care home visits are relaxed, with visiting time limits expanded from 30 minutes to four hours. Hand holding is also permitted.
- 13 October –
  - Cumbria Police warn fans of Celtic and Rangers against crossing the border into England in order to watch a forthcoming derby match between the two teams on pub televisions.
  - NHS Western Isles says that car sharing is a factor in a COVID-19 outbreak in the Western Isles.
- 14 October – People are warned against travelling to Blackpool after the town is linked to a "large and growing" number of Scottish COVID-19 cases.
- 15 October – First Minister Nicola Sturgeon says there will be no return to normal when COVID restrictions requiring pubs and restaurants to close expire on 26 October.
- 16 October –
  - New rules are announced for face coverings, requiring them to be worn in workplace canteens from Monday 19 October, but they will no longer be required at wedding ceremonies.
  - The Scottish Government establishes a £40m fund for hospitality businesses affected by closures due to the COVID outbreak, but industry leaders say it is not nearly enough.
- 17 October – Bosses at the Redmill care home in West Lothian confirm eleven COVID-19 deaths have occurred at the complex.
- 18 October – The Scottish Government confirms a delay to the publication of COVID-19 test results was caused by a "testing capacity issue" at the Lighthouse Laboratory in Glasgow, and that 64,000 tests were routed elsewhere.
- 20 October – As Scotland prepares to introduce an English-style tier system for COVID restrictions, First Minister Nicola Sturgeon says she will do everything she can to keep schools open.
- 21 October – The temporary restrictions affecting hospitality businesses in the Central Belt are extended until 2 November to coincide with the introduction of a new tier system of COVID measures.
- 22 October – Jason Leitch, Scotland's national clinical director, says that the idea of a normal Christmas is "fiction" and that people should prepare for a digital Christmas.
- 23 October –
  - First Minister Nicola Sturgeon unveils Scotland's new five-tier COVID-19 system, due to come into effect from 2 November.
  - A Scottish Premiership match between St Mirren and Hamilton Academical, scheduled for the following day, is postponed to a later date after a number of the Hamilton players are unable to play due to positive COVID tests.
- 24 October –
  - Deputy First Minister John Swinney says that efforts are under way to enable students to travel home for Christmas.
  - The Scottish Government issues guidelines discouraging guising (the act of going door-to-door) and parties over Halloween and Bonfire Night.
- 25 October –
  - Following a warning from the national clinical director that people should prepare for a digital Christmas, John Keenan, the Bishop of Paisley, calls for a 24-hour "circuit-breaker" that would allow families to spend Christmas together, comparing it to the Christmas Truce during World War I.
  - Deputy First Minister and Education Secretary John Swinney says that a staggered return to university for students in the New Year will form part of the strategy to get them home over Christmas, as well as the use of test and trace.
- 26 October – Deputy First Minister John Swinney says that students may not be allowed home for Christmas if the spread of COVID is not under control.
- 27 October – First Minister Nicola Sturgeon confirms that pubs and restaurants serving alcohol may reopen from 2 November, with the introduction of the new five-tier system of restrictions. Pubs in tier 2 can open until 8 pm, and pubs in tier 3 until 6 pm.
- 28 October –
  - Car sharing is linked to a spate of 1,000 new coronavirus infections within a week.
  - A report exposes that over 113 patients were discharged into care homes after having tested positive for COVID-19.
  - Council leaders in North and South Lanarkshire urge First Minister Nicola Sturgeon not to place the areas into tier 4 restrictions after she suggested this may happen.
- 29 October –
  - First Minister Nicola Sturgeon confirms North and South Lanarkshire, and Dundee, will join the Central Belt in tier 3 restrictions, while most of the rest of Scotland will be placed into tier 2; the Highlands, Orkney, Shetland, the Western Isles and Moray, where COVID cases are relatively low, will be placed in tier 1.
  - Sturgeon warns that Scotland could return to nationwide lockdown if people break regulations that prevent travel in or out of areas with level 3 restrictions.
- 30 October – Senior pupils and their teachers are being advised by the Scottish Government to wear face coverings in classrooms, if they are in the new level three and four restriction areas.
- 31 October – First Minister Nicola Sturgeon warns against travel to England as a four-week lockdown is announced there.

=== November 2020 ===
- 1 November –
  - First Minister Nicola Sturgeon, and Douglas Ross, leader of the Scottish Conservatives, seek clarity from the UK government on the extension of the furlough scheme, which has been extended until December because of England's second lockdown, and suggest it should be available for Scotland should a second lockdown be required there.
  - Prime Minister Boris Johnson announces that the furlough scheme will be available for future lockdowns in Scotland.
- 4 November – First Minister Nicola Sturgeon says the Scottish Government is "actively considering" putting into law a travel ban that would levy fines on those travelling in and out of COVID hotspots without a valid reason.
- 5 November – First Minister Nicola Sturgeon says that tough restrictions on household mixing and hospitality businesses are starting to have an effect.
- 8 November –
  - As a further 1,115 COVID cases are recorded, Professor Linda Bauld, a leading public health expert, says that pandemic is "stable" in Scotland, with restrictions having affected its growth.
  - The islands ferry MV Isle of Lewis, which travels between Oban and Barra, is given a deep clean after three people who travelled on the ship are reported to have contacted COVID.
- 10 November – The Scottish Government announces that Fife, Angus and Perth and Kinross are all to be moved from level two to level three of Scotland's five-tier COVID measures system from Friday 13 November, while from the same day, up to six people from two separate households can meet up indoors or outdoors in Shetland, Orkney and the Western Isles.
- 11 November –
  - A "coding error" in Scotland's Test and Protect contact-tracing service has led to staff overestimating the number of people contacted within 24 hours of testing positive for COVID-19. Amended data shows that staff failed to contact around half of those testing positive. First Minister Nicola Sturgeon says the error should not have happened.
  - Nicola Sturgeon advises people not to switch off the Test and Protect app after a letter sent to teachers in Aberdeen asked them to turn it off while they are in school.
- 12 November –
  - Public Health Scotland says that contact tracers have been unable to contact 8% of people testing positive for COVID-19 since the beginning of July, roughly 3,500 people.
  - First Minister Nicola Sturgeon announces that measures to control the virus have slowed its spread "very significantly".
- 13 November – Greater Glasgow and Clyde and Lanarkshire are warned they may be placed under tighter COVID restrictions in the coming days because of high numbers of cases there.
- 15 November – A number of COVID cases are detected at a school in the Western Isles.
- 16 November –
  - First Minister Nicola Sturgeon says that introducing Level 4 restrictions in the West of Scotland could help to pave the way for easing roles over the Christmas season.
  - The Education Institute of Scotland has asked teachers if they would be prepared to strike over COVID school safety concerns.
- 17 November – Level 4 restrictions are announced for 11 council areas in the west of Scotland, effective from 6 pm on 20 November until 11 December, and covering a population of 2.3 million people. The restrictions apply to East Dunbartonshire, East Renfrewshire, Glasgow, Renfrewshire, West Dunbartonshire, North and South Lanarkshire, East and South Ayrshire, Stirling and West Lothian, and will see bars and restaurants, gyms and non-essential shops closed for the duration of the measures. From 24 November, East Lothian and Midlothian will move from Level 3 to Level 2 restrictions.
- 18 November –
  - Figures released by National Records of Scotland indicate the number of deaths in Scotland where COVID was mentioned on the death certificate to have been 5,135 up to 15 November.
  - Figures released by Public Health Scotland show that the number of people diagnosed with cancer fell by 40% at the start of the pandemic.
  - The Scottish Tourism Alliance warns that moving the areas of Western Scotland to Level 4 restrictions will force many hotels to close until 2021.
- 19 November –
  - Health Secretary Jeane Freeman announces plans for the first COVID vaccines in Scotland to be administered in December.
  - In a letter to parents, Maureen McKenna, the director of education at Glasgow City Council, suggests COVID in the city is being spread by families hosting sleepovers for children and other social events.
- 20 November – At 6 pm, Level 4 restrictions begin in eleven council areas of Western Scotland.
- 21 November –
  - Concern is raised over hospital acquired COVID cases after figures released by Public Health Scotland indicate 180 definite or probable "hospital onset" infections in the week ending 25 October, up from 98 the previous week.
  - A care home in Larbert reports 20 COVID deaths in the space of a month, a figure thought to be the highest single number of deaths linked to a care home during the current outbreak.
  - A performance by folk rock band Torridon at the Ironworks in Inverness becomes the first indoor concert to take place since March, with 100 people in attendance.
- 22 November –
  - Health Secretary Jeane Freeman confirms that COVID vaccination will not be mandatory in Scotland, but expresses hope that most people will choose to be vaccinated.
  - Opposition parties call for a complete ban on discharging hospital patients to care homes unless they have received two negative COVID tests after reports the practice continues.
- 23 November – First Minister Nicola Sturgeon says that progress is being made over the approach for relaxing COVID regulations over Christmas, but she does not expect the same for Hogmanay.
- 25 November – First Minister Nicola Sturgeon speak about how she "agonised" over whether to allow people to meet up over Christmas and says it would be "safer" for them to not do so.
- 26 November – The Scottish Government stipulates that household "bubbles" over Christmas should contain no more than eight people over the age of eleven from three households.
- 27 November –
  - It is reported that talks are being held between the Scottish Government and education officials about extending the Christmas school holiday, and standardising the holiday from Friday 18 December to Monday 11 January.
  - Police Scotland says it has issued 33 fixed penalty fines for breach of COVID rules in the first five days of Scotland's tough new travel restrictions.
- 29 November – First Minister Nicola Sturgeon defends her handling of the COVID crisis after figures indicate Scotland to have a higher death rate in recent weeks. There were 50.5 deaths per million in Scotland in the week ending 15 November, compared to 40.6 in England.
- 30 November –
  - Mass testing is announced for university students, and people in five areas of Scotland, including Glasgow, Ayrshire, Clackmannanshire and Renfrewshire.
  - Scotland's National Clinical Director, Professor Jason Leitch, suggests that door-to-door carol singing should "probably not" take place over Christmas.
  - First Minister Nicola Sturgeon announces that every NHS and social care worker in Scotland will receive a £500 "thank you" payment for the role they played in the COVID-19 pandemic.

=== December 2020 ===
- 2 December – With the UK's approval of the Pfizer/BioNTech COVID vaccine, First Minister Nicola Sturgeon announces that people in Scotland should start to receive the vaccine from Tuesday 8 December.
- 3 December –
  - The first batch of the COVID vaccine to arrive in Scotland will be used for healthcare workers, with supplies reaching care homes on 14 December.
  - The Scottish Government confirms there will be no extension to the Christmas school holidays. Talks about a three-week holiday from 18 December to 11 January had been under way, but concerns were raised about the impact on teaching.
- 5 December – Health Secretary Jeane Freeman confirms the first supplies of the Pfizer/BioNTech vaccine have arrived in Scotland, with vaccinations set to begin on Tuesday 8 December.
- 6 December –
  - The number of people in Scotland testing positive for COVID-19 since the start of the pandemic passes 100,000, with 100,106 confirmed cases recorded.
  - There is uncertainty after Health Secretary Jeane Freeman appears to make contradicting statements over whether Level Four restrictions will be eased on 11 December.
- 8 December –
  - All eleven areas living under Level Four restrictions will be downgraded to Level Three from Friday 11 December, the Scottish Government announces.
  - Education Secretary John Swinney confirms that Higher and Advanced Higher exams will be cancelled in 2021, with pupils' grades based on teacher assessment.
  - Swinney also confirms that students' return to university after Christmas will be staggered over a period of six weeks.
- 9 December –
  - Finance Secretary Kate Forbes announces a further £185m of funding for taxi drivers, tourism firms and the wedding sector.
  - Council leaders in Edinburgh and Midlothian have expressed their anger that their areas will remain in Level 3 restrictions, despite expectations they would be moved to Level 2.
- 10 December –
  - First Minister Nicola Sturgeon says that lifting restrictions in Edinburgh would pose a "significant risk" of letting the virus run out of control.
  - The Scottish Government announces that low-level background music will be permitted again in hospitality venues from Saturday 12 December; the ban on music and televisions in pubs and restaurants came into force on 14 August to prevent people having to speak loudly and spreading COVID via airborne saliva.
  - Gordon Dewar, the chief executive of Edinburgh Airport, accuses First Minister Nicola Sturgeon of "campaigning" against the aviation industry after she warned she would not book a summer holiday "right now".
- 11 December –
  - Non-essential shops are allowed to reopen in 11 council areas, including Glasgow, as they are moved from Level 4 to Level 3 restrictions. But pubs and restaurants must remain closed until the following day.
  - A legal challenge to the decision to keep Edinburgh in Level 3 restrictions is rejected by the Court of Session.
  - St Matthew's Academy in Saltcoats moves to remote learning for the rest of the school term following a COVID outbreak.
- 12 December –
  - Pubs and restaurants in areas moved to level 3 restrictions the previous day are permitted to reopen, but must not serve alcohol and have to close at 6 pm.
  - Four arrests are made following an anti-lockdown protest in Edinburgh.
- 14 December –
  - Vaccinations using the Pfizer/BioNTech vaccine begin in Scottish care homes.
  - First Minister Nicola Sturgeon urges people in Scotland to "cut down on unnecessary contacts" now if they plan to meet up with relatives at Christmas.
  - Annie Innes, 90, from South Lanarkshire, becomes the first care home resident in Scotland to receive the Pfizer/BioNTech COVID vaccine as care home vaccinations begin.
  - Difficulties exist in administering the vaccine to residents of some Scottish islands because of the logistics of getting it to them. The vaccine, which has to be stored at -75C, is distributed from 23 freezers located around Scotland, limiting the timeframe and distance of its distribution. Residents of Lewis and mainland Orkney have been vaccinated, but it may not be possible to reach other outlying islanders.
- 15 December –
  - Aberdeen, Aberdeenshire and East Lothian will move from level two to level three restrictions from Friday 18 December in a bid to control rising COVID cases in those areas.
  - Nine cases of a new variant strain of COVID-19 are detected in Scotland.
- 16 December –
  - Following the UK-wide decision to go ahead with the relaxation of COVID rules over Christmas, separate households in Scotland are being urged to only meet up on one of the five days.
  - The number of COVID-related deaths in Scotland has passed 6,000, with 6,092 deaths having been registered by 13 December.
  - First Minister Nicola Sturgeon says that a technical glitch with an upgrade of the Protect Scotland contact-tracing app may have led to hundreds of people incorrectly being told to self-isolate.
- 17 December – Deputy First Minister John Swinney says that further restrictions, including a potential lockdown, cannot be ruled out after Christmas.
- 18 December – Health Secretary Jeane Freeman says that all options remain on the table as regards COVID restrictions following Christmas.
- 19 December – Following the emergence of a new, faster-spreading variant of COVID-19, First Minister Nicola Sturgeon announces that festive relaxation of restrictions will be limited to Christmas Day, with mainland Scotland placed under level four rules from Boxing Day. Travel to the rest of the UK is also prohibited.
- 20 December –
  - Police patrols along the England–Scotland border are to be doubled following the travel ban between the two countries, but there are no plans to put checkpoints or roadblocks in place.
  - Businesses in Scotland are calling for an "extraordinary" financial package to support them as Scotland approaches level four restrictions.
- 21 December – Businesses in level one areas have expressed their frustration at plans to move all of mainland Scotland to level four restrictions from Boxing Day.
- 22 December –
  - First Minister Nicola Sturgeon has said that level four restrictions may need to be strengthened in order to contain the new variant of COVID-19.
  - Sturgeon also apologises after she broke COVID regulations when attending a funeral by talking to people at a wake without wearing a face covering.
- 23 December –
  - A child under the age of one becomes Scotland's youngest COVID-19 related fatality.
  - First Minister Nicola Sturgeon apologises to the Scottish Parliament for breaching COVID regulations by removing her face covering at a wake, stating that she "was kicking [herself] very hard" over the incident.
- 24 December –
  - Office for National Statistics figures for Scotland indicate a fall in COVID cases, with 37,100 (one in 140) people having the virus in the week to 18 December, a drop from 52,500 (one in 100) in the week up to 11 December. But the new variant of COVID is believed to be responsible for 38% of new cases in the week to 18 December.
  - Dumfries and Galloway Health and Social Care Partnership says the new variant of COVID has been identified as part of an outbreak in Wigtownshire in the west of the region.
- 25 December – Restrictions are relaxed for Christmas Day to allow people to mix indoors and travel more freely.
- 26 December – Mainland Scotland moves into level four restrictions.
- 27 December – The Scottish Academy of Medical Royal Colleges and Faculties warns that the health service could be overwhelmed by any surge of COVID cases resulting from the temporary relaxation of rules on Christmas Day, and suggests the new strain of the virus could create a "perfect storm".
- 28 December –
  - A further 967 cases of COVID-19 take the total in Scotland past 120,000 to 120,891.
  - People in Dumfries and Galloway are urged to stay at home as much as possible after the number of COVID cases in the area doubled from 64 to 142 in two days.
- 29 December –
  - As a further 1,895 new COVID cases are reported, the highest number in a single day, First Minister Nicola Sturgeon urges people to stay at home at Hogmanay and not mix with others, declaring it to be "vitally important".
  - Health officials have said that Shetland may be moved into level four restrictions following an outbreak of COVID in the area; 34 cases have been reported in the preceding week, with 120 people asked to isolate and cases thus expected to rise.
  - A further 39 COVID cases are confirmed in the Wigtownshire area of Dumfries and Galloway, with 171 having been reported since Christmas Eve, prompting Elaine Murray, the leader of Dumfries and Galloway Council, to suggest further restrictions may be needed in the area.
- 30 December –
  - A further 2,045 COVID cases are recorded, the highest daily total since mass testing began, with First Minister Nicola Sturgeon describing the Variant of Concern 202012/01 as "fast becoming the dominant one".
  - First Minister Nicola Sturgeon says that the first doses of the Oxford vaccine will be given in Scotland on Monday 4 January.
- 31 December –
  - Scotland reports a third day of high COVID case numbers, with a further 2,622 positive tests recorded.
  - With Hogmanay events cancelled for New Year 2020–21, people are warned to stay at home.

== See also ==
- Timeline of the COVID-19 pandemic in Scotland (2021)
- Timeline of the COVID-19 pandemic in Scotland (2022)
- Timeline of the COVID-19 pandemic in the United Kingdom (January–June 2020)
- Timeline of the COVID-19 pandemic in the United Kingdom (July–December 2020)
- Timeline of the COVID-19 pandemic in the United Kingdom (2021)
- Timeline of the COVID-19 pandemic in England (2020)
- Timeline of the COVID-19 pandemic in England (2021)
- Timeline of the COVID-19 pandemic in Wales (2020)
- Timeline of the COVID-19 pandemic in Wales (2021)
- Timeline of the COVID-19 pandemic in Northern Ireland (2020)
- Timeline of the COVID-19 pandemic in Northern Ireland (2021)
