= Timeline of the COVID-19 pandemic in Scotland (2021) =

Daily Scottish events related to the COVID-19 pandemic in 2021

The following is a timeline of the COVID-19 pandemic in Scotland during 2021. There are significant differences in the legislation and the reporting between the countries of the UK: England, Scotland, Northern Ireland, and Wales.

== Timeline ==
=== January 2021 ===
- 1 January –
  - First Minister Nicola Sturgeon warns that the new variant of COVID-19 is "accelerating spread" across Scotland, and that the next few weeks could be the most dangerous period since March.
  - A further 14 cases are recorded in Shetland, taking the number in the outbreak there to 72.
  - Police break up a number of New Year gatherings, including one at Edinburgh Castle attended by several hundred people.
- 2 January –
  - A further 2,137 are confirmed in Scotland, a lower figure than the previous day, which First Minister Nicola Sturgeon had described as "worryingly high".
  - Citizens Advice Scotland has warned of an "explosion" of Council Tax debt in 2021 as a result of the COVID pandemic, with average debts at £3,000, twice that of an average Council Tax bill. The Scottish Government says it has set aside an extra £25m for councils on top of the Council Tax Reduction Scheme, already worth £351m.
- 3 January –
  - As a further 2,464 COVID cases are reported in Scotland, it is confirmed the Scottish Cabinet will meet the next day to discuss further restrictions to slow the spread of the virus.
  - The Royal Zoological Society of Scotland, which runs Edinburgh Zoo, reports that COVID-19 has led to a £2m loss of revenue, and as a consequence the zoo's two giant pandas may have to return to China; the pandas cost £1m a year to rent from China, with the ten-year deal the zoo has with China due to expire in 2022.
- 4 January –
  - Mainland Scotland is placed under lockdown until the end of January, beginning from midnight; schools are closed and people ordered to stay at home except for essential purposes.
  - Margaret Ferrier, the MP for Rutherglen, is arrested by Scottish police and charged in connection with "alleged culpable and reckless conduct" for using public transport while experiencing COVID symptoms.
- 5 January –
  - First Minister Nicola Sturgeon says that Scotland hopes to accelerate its vaccination programme given the supplies to allow it to happen.
  - Figures released by Police Scotland indicate more than 300 fines were issued for breach of COVID rules over the New Year.
- 6 January –
  - Figures have shown that 92,188 people have received a COVID vaccine in Scotland since 8 December, with 33,381 doing so in the week to 27 December.
  - NHS Highland warns of a "significant increase" in COVID cases in the Highland and Argyll and Bute areas, attributing the rise to families socialising indoors.
- 7 January – First Minister Nicola Sturgeon announces that medical staff are "well over half way through" vaccinating care home residents in Scotland.
- 8 January –
  - After a further 93 deaths are confirmed, First Minister Nicola Sturgeon describes the figures as "distressingly high".
  - Plans for students to return to universities in Scotland are delayed until the end of February.
- 9 January –
  - Figures released by the Scottish Government show there to be 1,596 people in hospital with COVID, the highest number so far.
  - BBC research has suggested that not all schoolchildren in Scotland will receive livestreamed lessons when the new term begins on 11 January, with access to remote learning varying from area to area. Some councils have protocols in place for remote learning while others have left it up to individual schools; vulnerable children and those of essential workers will attend school as normal and have face-to-face lessons.
- 10 January –
  - As the number of COVID patients in hospital rises to 1,877, Deputy First Minister John Swinney warns that further restrictions cannot be ruled out.
  - Police have warned people to stay away from an anti-lockdown protest planned in Edinburgh for the following day, as the event is illegal.
- 11 January –
  - The wider rollout of the Oxford/AstraZeneca vaccine begins at 1,100 locations across Scotland.
  - First Minister Nicola Sturgeon urges football clubs not to "abuse" the privileges they have been afforded after members of Celtic were forced to self-isolate after a player contracted COVID-19 during a midseason trip to a training camp in Dubai.
- 12 January –
  - A further 54 deaths take the number of COVID deaths in Scotland past 5,000 to 5,023. Responding to the news, First Minister Nicola Sturgeon says it is "very unlikely" that lockdown restrictions will be lifted at the end of the month.
  - NHS Lanarkshire and NHS Ayrshire and Arran have postponed all non-urgent surgery because of the pressure being placed on hospital services because of COVID-19.
- 13 January –
  - First Minister Nicola Sturgeon announces a tightening of COVID restrictions from Saturday 16 January for click-and-collect services and takeaways. The new rules will restrict click-and-collect to essential items only, with appointments being required so as to avoid queues, while takeaway food establishments will not be permitted to allow customers into the premises. The outdoor consumption of alcohol is also banned in level four areas.
  - The Most Reverend Philip Tartaglia, the Roman Catholic Archbishop of Glasgow, dies after contracting COVID.
- 14 January –
  - The Scottish Government removes its COVID vaccination plan from its website after concerns are expressed by the UK government that the document contained sensitive data that should not have been published.
  - NHS Western Isles warns of rising COVID cases on the island of Barra.
- 15 January –
  - The Scottish Conservatives have claimed that Health Secretary Jeane Freeman may have broken the ministerial code by revealing the location of a COVID vaccination storage facility during a question and answer session with MSPs.
  - Kilmarnock and St Mirren win appeals against match defeats handed them due to COVID breaches, with the Scottish Football Association ruling that half the £40,000 fines each were asked to pay will be suspended, and all matches involved replayed.
- 16 January –
  - Scotland begins a mass vaccination of healthcare workers.
  - A further 17 COVID-19 cases are identified on the island of Barra, prompting health officials to describe the situation as "serious, and escalating".
- 17 January –
  - Doctors leaders have warned that a "patchy supply" of vaccines to GPs surgeries in Scotland is hampering its deployment.
  - Data published by Friends of the Earth Scotland indicates that air pollution levels were within the legal limit for the first time during the March 2020 lockdown.
- 18 January –
  - The Armed Forces are helping to establish a further 80 COVID vaccination centres in Scotland, it is reported.
  - A £1,500 grant for taxi cab and private hire drivers is announced, but those claiming Universal Credit will not be eligible for the payment.
- 19 January –
  - First Minister Nicola Sturgeon extends Scotland's lockdown until mid-February, meaning schools will remain closed.
  - Sturgeon says that Scotland will meet its vaccination targets after opposition parties express concerns about vaccine supplies amid frustration from GPs who say they are still waiting for deliveries.
  - The islands of Barra and Vatersay are moved from level three to level four restrictions from midnight, due to a "significant outbreak" of COVID-19 there.
- 20 January –
  - First Minister Nicola Sturgeon insists that Scotland is not lagging behind the rest of the UK when it comes to COVID vaccination after opposition parties expressed their concern that many GPs surgeries have not been given supplies of the vaccine.
  - Official figures released by the National Records of Scotland indicate 2020 had the highest number of peacetime deaths since 1891.
- 21 January –
  - It is reported that a special Crown Office unit established in May 2020 to investigate COVID-related deaths is probing deaths at 474 care homes in Scotland.
  - Figures indicate the Edinburgh suburb of West Liberton and Braid Hills has Scotland's worst COVID death rate, with 1 in 100. The suburb has had 38 deaths, and the 1 in 100 figure is largely due to deaths at a care home.
- 22 January – First Minister Nicola Sturgeon says there are grounds for "cautious optimism" that lockdown measures are working.
- 23 January – A day after First Minister Nicola Sturgeon announces that 34% of those aged 80 and over have been vaccinated, volunteers at a Midlothian food bank reveal that they have received the vaccine before the majority of those aged over 80.
- 24 January – Police Scotland say they have charged two women with COVID breaches after they were rescued when they got into difficulty while climbing Ben Lomond the previous afternoon.
- 25 January –
  - NHS Scotland begins sending out vaccination appointments for people aged 70–79, but a plan to have them sent in blue envelopes is delayed, meaning they will arrive in white envelopes instead.
  - The Scottish Government is looking into ways to accelerate the rate at which vaccinations are given, including piloting 24-hour vaccination centres.
- 26 January –
  - Vaccination figures indicate 51% of those aged 80 and over in Scotland have had their first COVID vaccine, a figure lower than the UK average of 78.7%.
  - Work on a COVID testing "mega lab" at an undisclosed location in Scotland is halted while the UK government assesses the "long term need for it"; if built the lab would increase the daily testing capacity by 300,000.
- 27 January – Mass testing finds a COVID outbreak at an Aberdeen care home, where 85 test positive for the virus.
- 28 January – Prime Minister Boris Johnson visits Scotland, where his trip includes a tour of the Lighthouse Laboratory at Glasgow's Queen Elizabeth University Hospital campus, Scotland's largest facility where COVID testing is processed.
- 29 January –
  - The number of COVID deaths in Scotland passes 6,000 after a further 70 deaths take the total to 6,040.
  - The whole of the Western Isles is moved to level four restrictions from midnight to control a spike in COVID cases.
- 30 January – National Clinical Director Professor Jason Leitch suggests that spectators may be able to return to Scottish football stadiums for the 2021–22 season "if we get it right as a nation".

=== February 2021 ===
- 1 February –
  - First Minister Nicola Sturgeon confirms that 98% of elderly care home residents have been offered their first COVID vaccination, together with 80% of those aged over 80 in the wider community.
  - Sturgeon announces that rules requiring passengers arriving into Scotland from high risk "red list" countries to quarantine in hotels do not go far enough, and confirms plans to introduce a "much more comprehensive" approach to "managed quarantine".
  - Speaking about the pressure COVID placed on government policy makers, Health Minister Vaughan Gething suggests that an earlier lockdown could have saved more lives, but says that the right decisions were made given the information available at the time those decisions were made.
- 2 February – The Scottish Government outlines plans for a phased return to full-time education beginning on 22 February, though a final decision will be made in the week preceding that date. The reopening of schools will begin with preschool and the years P1–P3. There will also be a limited return for senior pupils to allow them to complete work for national qualifications.
- 3 February –
  - The University of Dundee launches the UK-wide VAC4COVID study to measure the safety and effectiveness of COVID vaccines as they are delivered, and appeals for volunteers to participate.
  - Airport bosses have expressed their concern at the Scottish Government's new tougher quarantine plans which they say are unclear.
  - Scottish National Party MP Margaret Ferrier appears in court charged with "culpable and reckless" conduct over her decision to travel on public transport after testing positive for COVID-19 in September 2020.
- 4 February – The percentage of people testing positive for COVID in Scotland falls to 4.9%, its lowest for a month.
- 5 February – The latest daily vaccination figures for Scotland show that 48,165 were delivered the previous day, double the figure for the same day the previous week.
- 6 February – The latest figures show 786,427 people had received the first dose of COVID vaccine up to 5 February, with 90% of those aged 80 or over having done so.
- 7 February – Health Secretary Jeane Freeman says that her ambition is to have every adult in Scotland vaccinated "in the summer".
- 8 February – Data released by Police Scotland suggests an increasing number of properties are being booked through online websites for illegal parties and gatherings.
- 9 February – All travellers arriving into Scotland by air will be required to quarantine for ten days at a government authorised hotel from 15 February, the Scottish Government announces.
- 10 February – The number of people receiving their first COVID vaccination in Scotland passes the one million mark.
- 11 February –
  - First Minister Nicola Sturgeon suggests the rate of COVID vaccinations could slow down later in the month because of supply issues.
  - Sturgeon also claims that UK borders will be "too leaky" despite the introduction of hotel quarantine rules for international travellers.
- 13 February – A Scottish Government advisory group has recommended secondary school pupils should follow two metre social distancing rules while travelling on school buses when they return to school later in February as an "additional protective measure".
- 14 February – Transport Secretary Michael Matheson urges the UK government to offer international travellers bound for Scotland quarantine facilities in England should they arrive there, describing it as "absolutely critical". His comments come on the eve of the launch of the UK's hotel quarantine scheme, and different rules for Scotland and the rest of the UK. While the rest of the UK has stipulated only those arriving from countries on the "red list" must quarantine at government designated hotels, Scotland wants the rules to apply to all international travellers arriving there.
- 15 February – A father and daughter who became the first travellers to go into Scotland's quarantine programme after arriving from the United States have been told they can leave quarantine because of a loophole triggered after they stopped at Dublin during their journey, and thus meant they had arrived in Scotland from a country in the Common Travel Area that negates the need for them to quarantine. In response, UK Health Secretary Matt Hancock says he is happy to discuss measures that would close the loophole.
- 16 February –
  - First Minister Nicola Sturgeon announces that children in years P1 to P3, pre-school and some secondary pupils who need to complete coursework, will return to school for face-to-face learning from Monday 22 February.
  - Sturgeon urges people not to book Easter holidays because it is "highly unlikely" self-catering accommodation and hotels will be reopened by then.
  - Finance Secretary Kate Forbes announces an extension of the Business rates relief scheme to cover the 2021–22 financial year.
- 17 February – First Minister Nicola Sturgeon says there is "hard evidence" vaccination is reducing the number of deaths from COVID, with the weekly death rate having fallen for three consecutive weeks, and fallen in care homes by 62% during that time.
- 18 February – Professor Jason Leitch, Scotland's National Clinical Director, suggests Scotland could "strive" for complete elimination of COVID-19, but this would require the country to isolate, preventing international travel "for some time".
- 19 February –
  - Figures released by the Scottish Prison Service show the number of COVID-19 cases in Scottish prisons has doubled in a week from 189 to 364.
  - Lateral flow asymptomatic COVID testing is to be rolled out in Glasgow, the Scottish Government announces.
  - Dental schools in Scotland have announced they will not accept new students for the 2021–22 academic year because of existing students who will have to repeat a year because of missed clinical training due to the COVID-19 pandemic.
- 20 February – The Scottish Government confirms that care home visits will resume in March, with residents allowed two designated visitors to visit them once a week.
- 21 February –
  - Ahead of the return of Scotland's first pupils to school, Education Secretary John Swinney attempts to reassure the public it is safe for children to begin returning to school.
  - The Scottish Government reiterates comments made by Prime Minister Boris Johnson that all adults will receive their first COVID injection by the end of July, if supplies are available.
- 22 February – Scotland's schools begin a phased reopening, with the youngest pupils returning to the classroom.
- 23 February –
  - First Minister of Scotland Nicola Sturgeon unveils the Scottish Government's strategy for reopening the economy in Scotland. The plan includes the following:
    - All primary pupils, and senior pupils from Years S5 and S6 to return to the classroom on 15 March, but other secondary pupils may not return to school until after Easter. Also on 15 March, four people from two separate households to be allowed to meet up outdoors.
    - Scotland's stay at home restrictions could be lifted on 5 April.
    - The reopening of non-essential retail, restaurants, pubs, gyms and hairdressers is expected to start from 26 April.
  - A man whose ten-year-old son was required to quarantine at a hotel after arriving from Finland has urged the Scottish Government to reconsider its isolation policy for travellers.
  - Figures released by Public Health Scotland indicate the number of people waiting for an endoscopy in Scotland has increased by 44.5% during the pandemic, with 31,637 people waiting for the procedure.
- 25 February – With Hampden Park scheduled to host four match fixtures in this summer's Euro 2020 Cup, Sports Minister Mairi Gougeon warns there is no guarantee that the stadium will be able to allow spectators in to watch the matches.
- 26 February – Highlands Council announces £150m spending on improvements to tourism post-COVID and in order to address problems encountered in Summer 2020 when the area experienced an "unprecedented" level of tourism. The money will be spent on things such as parking for motorhomes and public toilets.

=== March 2021 ===
- 1 March –
  - Visiting restrictions on care homes are relaxed, allowing residents to choose two visitors who can visit them once a week.
  - Scotland plans to return to a tier system once lockdown has ended, but with tougher measures than previously.
- 2 March –
  - First Minister Nicola Sturgeon confirms that all secondary school pupils will return to the classroom part-time from 15 March, with priority given to those in years due to take public examinations.
  - With COVID cases at their lowest in five months, Sturgeon suggests lockdown measures could be lifted faster than scheduled.
- 3 March –
  - A Scottish Government advisory group recommends that all secondary pupils should wear face coverings when they return to the classroom later in the month.
  - It is reported that a third of passengers who arrived on a flight to Aberdeen from which three people tested positive for Brazilian variant COVID are yet to be traced.
- 5 March – First Minister Nicola Sturgeon says she hopes to be able to announce "relatively minor but important" changes to outdoor socialising on Tuesday 9 March.
- 6 March –
  - The Scottish Government says that no further cases of Brazilian variant COVID have been detected in Scotland.
  - The Scottish Government expresses its disappointment that a large crowd of Rangers fans gathered outside Ibrox Stadium ahead of their game with St. Mirren.
- 7 March – Rangers fans once again gather at Ibrox Stadium, to celebrate the club winning the Scottish Premiership, their first top-flight title in a decade.
- 8 March – Police Scotland criticise Rangers for failing to tell celebrating fans to disperse.
- 9 March –
  - First Minister Nicola Sturgeon announces a slight easing of rules, allowing four people from two separate households to meet up outdoors or four youngsters aged 12–17 from four separate households to meet up from Friday 12 March. Outdoor non-contact sports will be allowed from the same day. Communal worship of no more than 50 people will be allowed from 26 March.
  - Sturgeon says she "cannot simply turn a blind eye" to the mass gathering of Rangers fans, and wants assurances it will not happen again.
  - Following England's announcement that five of its NHS Nightingale hospitals will close, the Scottish Government confirms that NHS Louisa Jordan, the emergency COVID hospital in Glasgow, is to stay open for the time being.
- 10 March – Two shutdowns at the Ferguson Shipyard during the pandemic have added an extra £4.3m to the cost of two Caledonian MacBrayne ferries, which have been delayed due to the shutdowns.
- 11 March – The BBC announces plans to adapt its coverage of Scottish Government daily briefings during the weeks preceding the Scottish Parliament election after the Conservatives accused First Minister Nicola Sturgeon of using the briefings to "launch political attacks".
- 12 March –
  - Leading public health expert Professor Linda Bauld of the University of Edinburgh has said she believes many aspects of life could return to normal by mid-June.
  - Organisers of a vigil for London woman Sarah Everard planned for the following day in Edinburgh cancel it in favour of an online event following a warning from Health Secretary Jeane Freeman that public gatherings risk further spread of the COVID virus.
- 13 March –
  - The 25th anniversary of the Dunblane Massacre is marked privately in the town of Dunblane because of COVID restrictions, with an online church service remembering those killed in the massacre.
  - Following the cancellation of a Glasgow vigil for deceased London woman Sarah Everard due to COVID restrictions, ribbons are instead tied to trees and fences in the city.
- 14 March –
  - Hospitality sector leaders in Scotland have urged the Scottish Government to rethink its COVID exit strategy to stop businesses from folding, submitting a document suggesting that Scotland mirrors England for reopening businesses.
  - After First Minister Nicola Sturgeon announces that all secondary school pupils will have some time in school from Monday 15 March, the Educational Institute of Scotland teaching union accuses foe Scottish Government of making a "political decision" rather than one to benefit pupils.
- 15 March –
  - Chief Medical Officer Gregor Smith says he is "wholly confident" in the Oxford–AstraZeneca vaccine after its use was paused by several European countries amid concerns over a possible link to blood clots.
  - An evangelical church in Motherwell is reported to police for illegally holding services in breach of COVID restrictions.
- 16 March – First Minister Nicola Sturgeon sets out the easing of restrictions in Scotland, with the stay at home order lifted on 2 April in favour of a stay local order within local authority areas, the reopening of hairdressers and garden centres on 5 April, the lifting of the stay local order on 26 April in favour of a stay within Scotland order and the reopening of gyms and tourist accommodation.
- 17 March –
  - Two million people in Scotland have received their first COVID vaccine, or 44% of the population.
  - Police break up a large gathering of people in Glasgow's Kelvingrove Park.
- 18 March –
  - Scotland will get 500,000 fewer vaccine doses over the coming month due to UK vaccine supplies.
  - The NHS Louisa Jordan temporary hospital is to close at the end of March, it is confirmed.
  - Scotland's children's commissioner expresses concern about the potential impact of hotel quarantine on children.
- 19 March – The British Dental Association warns of a "looming oral health crisis" in months and years to come as the suspension of dental treatment during the pandemic has meant the early signs of illnesses such as oral cancers have been missed in some patients.
- 20 March –
  - Police Scotland say they are investigating the theft of a vial of COVID vaccination from a vaccination centre in Edinburgh.
  - An outbreak of COVID at the University of Dundee that has seen 30 students test positive is believed to be linked to a party at the university.
  - Professor Jason Leitch, Scotland's national clinical director, says that holidays in Europe are looking "less likely" in 2021 following a rise in COVID cases on the continent.
  - Dozens of police officers have tested positive for COVID-19 two weeks after the Rangers celebrations.
- 21 March – Fans of Celtic and Rangers have been praised by Police Scotland for following stay at home rules during an Old Firm clash between the football rivals.
- 24 March –
  - The Western Isles are moved back down to level 3 from 18:00.
  - The Scottish Government announces that NHS staff in Scotland will receive a pay rise of at least 4%.
- 25 March – Organisers of the Belladrum Festival, scheduled for the end of July, have cancelled the 2021 event.
- 26 March – Figures from the Office for National Statistics indicate Scotland to have the highest number of COVID cases in the UK, and a slight rise in COVID figures is also reported in Scotland as the rest of the UK's cases level out.
- 27 March – The latest figures show that as of the previous day, 2,358,807 people had received their first COVID vaccination, while 294,714 have received their second. On the same day, a further 563 new COVID cases were recorded, along with six deaths.
- 28 March – A further 422 COVID cases are recorded for the most recent 24 hours, but no further COVID related deaths.
- 30 March – First Minister Nicola Sturgeon confirms the "stay at home" order for Scotland will be lifted from Friday 2 April, while hairdressers, barbers, garden centres, click and collect and homeware stores can reopen from 5 April.
- 31 March – The latest figures show that 2,463,069 people have received their first COVID vaccination, and 338,443 have received their second, while COVID-related deaths continue to fall.

=== April 2021 ===
- 1 April –
  - Dr Gregor Smith, Scotland's Chief Medical Officer, says that doses of the Moderna COVID-19 vaccine could arrive in Scotland within days.
  - The quarantine rules are amended to allow children arriving unaccompanied into Scotland to quarantine at home rather than at a designated hotel.
- 2 April – The "stay at home" order is lifted in Scotland, and replaced with a three-week "stay local" order that requires people to stay within their local council area.
- 3 April – Thousands of people gather at Edinburgh's The Meadows to enjoy the good weather. Three arrests are made after fighting breaks out among some of the parkgoers.
- 5 April –
  - Hairdressers, barbers, garden centres, click and collect and homeware stores are permitted to reopen.
  - Health Secretary Jeane Freeman tells BBC Radio Scotland's Good Morning Scotland the Scottish Government is looking at the possibility of a "digital certificate" as a way for people to prove they have been vaccinated.
- 6 April – First Minister Nicola Sturgeon confirms that all secondary school pupils will return full time to the classroom after the Easter holidays. They will no longer need to follow social distancing rules, but must wear face coverings throughout the school.
- 7 April –
  - The first doses of the Moderna COVID vaccine are administered in Scotland at the SSE Hydro in Glasgow.
  - The Scottish Government gives its approval for 12,000 spectators to attend Euro 2020 matches at Hampden Park in June, meaning roughly 25% of the stadium's crowd capacity will be utilised.
- 8 April – Health Secretary Jeane Freeman says the Scottish Government failed to understand the needs of social care when discharging elderly patients from hospital to care homes during the pandemic.
- 10 April – National Clinical Director Professor Jason Leitch receives his first COVID vaccination.
- 11 April – A further 250 new COVID cases are recorded for the most recent 24-hour period, and no further deaths.
- 13 April –
  - Invitations are to be sent out to adults in the 45–49 age group for their first COVID vaccine.
  - First Minister Nicola Sturgeon announces that the stay local rule will be lifted from Friday 16 April, allowing people to travel around Scotland. Six people from six separate households will also be able to meet up outdoors. The easing of these rules has been moved forward in order to help people's mental health.
  - The Edinburgh International Festival will return in 2021, but exclusively with outdoor events.
- 14 April – Figures from National Records of Scotland indicate March 2021 to be the first month since October 2020 when COVID was not cited as the leading cause of death.
- 16 April – The stay local rule is lifted for Scotland and up to six people from six different households are allowed to meet up outside again, but people are still not permitted to stay overnight outside their council area, and the advice remains for people to shop within their council area whenever possible.
- 18 April – A full breakdown of COVID-19 related deaths in every Scottish care home is published by the Crown Office.
- 20 April – First Minister Nicola Sturgeon confirms the reopening of outdoor hospitality, gyms and non-essential retail from Monday 26 April. Non-essential travel between Scotland and the UK's other Home Nations is also permitted again from that date.
- 21 April –
  - Official figures have indicated the lowest weekly COVID-related deaths since October 2020, with 24 death certificates mentioning the virus in the week of 11–18 April, down from 34 the previous week.
  - Public Health Scotland says it "cannot rule out" a link between the discharge of patients from hospital and care home deaths from COVID-19.
- 22 April – Public health officials confirm that a digital scheme to enable people to prove their vaccine status is under development.
- 23 April –
  - Scotland's R number falls for the first time in four weeks, dropping from 1.0–0.8 to 0.7–0.9.
  - Nine of the 16 entrances to Glasgow's Kelvingrove Park are locked to discourage visitors after public disturbances, while police warn people not to break COVID regulations over the coming weekend, which is forecast to have sunny weather.
- 26 April –
  - Non-essential shops, gyms, swimming pools, pubs, restaurants and cafes are allowed to reopen, while travel between Scotland and the rest of the UK is also permitted again.
  - As the number of second COVID vaccines passes a million, figures show that 1,068,704 people (23.5% of the adult population) have received their second vaccine, while 2.8 million (61%) have had their first dose.
  - Rapid flow tests are made available to everyone in Scotland, and can be picked up from walk in test centres and drive through centres without an appointment from 3.30pm each day.
- 29 April – Universities are reported to be in talks with the Scottish Government over plans to allow overseas students to bypass hotel quarantine.
- 30 April – Every Scottish council area apart from Moray has met the criteria for dropping down to level two restrictions by having a weekly average of below 50 COVID cases. Moray had 50.1 on 27 April, having initially met the criteria the previous day.

=== May 2021 ===
- 2 May – Following the first full week of trading for non-essential retail in Scotland, the Scottish Retail Consortium (SRC) declares the reopening a success, and says Scottish retailers have performed better than their counterparts in England and Wales.
- 4 May –
  - Jillian Evans, head of health intelligence at NHS Grampian, warns that level 3 restrictions may remain in place past mid-May in Moray if COVID case numbers do not fall.
  - McGill's Bus Services calls for social distancing rules on public transport to be relaxed in order to cater for the increased volume of passengers associated with the easing of COVID rules.
- 5 May –
  - Figures from National Records of Scotland indicate that 20 of the 32 council areas recorded no COVID deaths in the week of 26 April–2 May; 19 COVID related deaths were recorded in total during that week.
  - Figures from Scotland's health service show that more than a billion pieces of Personal Protective Equipment (PPE) have been issued since the start of the pandemic.
  - More than 40 COVID cases are linked to a school in Moray as NHS Grampian reports an increase in the number of hospital admissions.
- 6 May –
  - Figures published by Public Health Scotland show Scotland has experienced its first seven-day period without any COVID deaths for eight months, with no deaths recorded between 29 April and 5 May 2021.
  - Public health officials warn that Moray is experiencing "uncontrolled, sustained community transmission" of COVID-19, with a case rate of 81 in 100,000.
- 8 May – Scotland records a day without any COVID related deaths.
- 10 May –
  - Following an investigation health officials have concluded that residents of a Midlothian nursing home at the centre o a COVID outbreak experienced "unnecessary harm and suffering".
  - Scotland records a day without any COVID related deaths.
- 11 May –
  - First Minister Nicola Sturgeon confirms that people will be allowed to meet up indoors from Monday 17 May, while hugging will also be permitted.
  - In other changes, a traffic lights system for international travel is to come into effect from 17 May.
- 12 May –
  - As Scotland prepares to move from level 3 to level 2 restrictions concern grows about increasing cases of COVID in Glasgow, where the rate is 58.3 per 100,000, slightly above the threshold for moving down to the lower level.
  - The Western Isles Health Board confirms that every adult in the region has been offered their first COVID vaccine, with 86.7% having received a first vaccine.
- 13 May – The Scottish Solicitors Bar Association announces a boycott of courts by criminal lawyers on Monday 17 May in protest at the lack of funding from the government during the COVID crisis.
- 14 May –
  - First Minister Nicola Sturgeon confirms that Glasgow and Moray will remain in level 3 restrictions for a further week after the rest of Scotland moves to level 2 on Monday 17 May due to high rates of COVID in those areas.
  - The decision to play the 2021 Scottish Cup Final in front of 600 fans at Hampden Park is overturned because of rising COVID cases in Glasgow.
- 15 May –
  - The latest figures show that 3,003,339 people (roughly two thirds of the population) have now received their first COVID vaccine, with 1,599,519 having also received their second.
  - Several arrests are made when thousands of fans gather in Glasgow city centre after Rangers win the 2020–21 Scottish Premiership. They had been asked not to gather.
- 16 May – On the eve of the day when Scotland is set to move from level 3 to level 2 restrictions, the country's National Clinical Director Professor Jason Leitch warns Glasgow may have to stay in level 3 restrictions for longer than the initial extra week that is planned.
- 17 May –
  - Most of mainland Scotland, with the exception of Moray and Glasgow, moves from level 3 to level 2 restrictions, allowing pubs and restaurants to open for indoor service, and other venues such as bingo halls and cinemas to reopen. Hugging is also permitted. The Scottish island regions move to level 1.
  - The number of COVID cases continues to rise in Glasgow, with cases now above 100 in 100,000.
- 18 May –
  - It is reported that Deputy First Minister John Swinney is to be appointed as Minister for COVID Recovery.
  - It is revealed that an application to have 10,000 Rangers fans in attendance at Ibrox Stadium for a trophy presentation was rejected by the Scottish Government.
- 19 May –
  - First Minister Nicola Sturgeon announces her new government following the 2021 Scottish Parliament election. Appointments include Humza Yousaf as Health Secretary and confirmation of John Swinney as Cabinet Secretary for Covid Recovery.
  - The Scottish Government confirms that people travelling overseas will be able to access a vaccine certificate, either online or by request through the post.
  - National Records of Scotland confirms that three deaths in Scotland have been linked to "extremely rare" reactions to the COVID vaccine.
- 20 May – Figures shows that in the week up to 17 May, East Renfrewshire rises to 118.3 cases per 100,000, above Glasgow at 112.1 to become the highest council area in Scotland meaning it could be moved back up to level 3 measures.
- 21 May –
  - Following a review, Moray is to be moved from level 3 to level 2 restrictions from midnight, leaving Glasgow as the only council area in Scotland to remain in level 3.
  - The General Assembly of the Church of Scotland reconvenes, having been cancelled in 2020, but sessions are largely conducted remotely.
- 22 May – After a security flaw emerges that would allow people to alter their vaccination status after downloading their vaccination certificate, the Scottish Government says it is working to rectify the situation.
- 23 May – Health Secretary Humza Yousaf says that Glasgow may move down to level 2 restrictions if the number of intensive care patients does not rise.
- 24 May –
  - Clackmannanshire overtakes Glasgow as having the highest COVID rate, with the seven day rate for the area at 139.7 cases per 100,000 compared to 136.8 for Glasgow.
  - It is reported that at least half of those scheduled to attend a vaccination centre in Glasgow over the preceding weekend did not turn up. This is subsequently discovered to be because of a fault with the appointment system that means letters inviting people for appointments were delayed. The Scottish Government issues an apology for the error.
- 25 May –
  - First Minister Nicola Sturgeon says there are signs for "cautious optimism" despite an increase in the number of COVID cases in Scotland, describing it ats " a "bump in the road".
  - More than a quarter of Scotland's libraries remain closed a month on from the biggest easing of COVID restrictions that allowed them to open, it is reported.
- 26 May –
  - Figures are published by National Records of Scotland showing the number of COVID related deaths by hospital since March 2020. The Queen Elizabeth University Hospital in Glasgow, Scotland's largest hospital, is shown to have had the largest number of deaths with 80.
  - Scottish Greens co-leaders Patrick Harvie and Lorna Slater, as well as Green MSP Ross Greer have apologised after they were pictured breaking COVID rules regarding indoor socialising at a pub.
- 28 May – First Minister Nicola Sturgeon confirms that Glasgow will remain in level 3 restrictions for at least another week.
- 29 May – A drop-in vaccination centre opens in Glasgow aimed at people aged over 40 who are yet to receive their first COVID jab or who had their first AstraZeneca injection ten weeks ago.
- 30 May –
  - Deputy First Minister John Swinney suggests that Glasgow could be out of level 3 restrictions by the end of the week, and wants them listed before the city plays host to matches in the Euro 2020 competition.
  - The number of fully vaccinated people in Scotland passes two million, with the latest figures showing 2,022,728 have received both doses of the vaccine.
- 31 May – With rules scheduled to change in a week's time, Health Secretary Humza Yousaf says restrictions may not be relaxed in areas where COVID cases are rising.

=== June 2021 ===
- 1 June –
  - First Minister Nicola Sturgeon announces the next round of relaxing restrictions, with Glasgow moving from level 3 to level 2 restrictions from Saturday 5 June. Some areas of Scotland will move to level 1 restrictions, but 13 council areas in the Central Belt where COVID cases remain significantly high to cause concern will remain in level 2. Island communities will move to level zero, meaning they have no restrictions.
  - National Clinical Director Professor Jason Leitch has suggested Scotland is at the beginning of a third wave of COVID.
- 2 June –
  - Education Secretary Shirley-Anne Somerville confirms pupils will be able to appeal their assessment grades when they are released later in the year, but that they may be revised up or down.
  - Health officials warn of a potential rise in COVID cases following a "significant outbreak" in Fort William; 60 cases have been recorded so far.
  - Scottish Conservatives leader Douglas Ross self-isolates after Scottish Office Minister David Duguid tests positive for COVID; the two have carried out a number of engagements together.
- 3 June –
  - NHS Lanarkshire announce plans to bring forward second COVID injections from twelve to eight weeks in a bid to tackle cases of Indian variant COVID.
  - The Scottish Government announces plans to reform Education Scotland and the Scottish Qualifications Authority (SQA) amid criticism of the plans put in place to replace school exams for 2021.
- 4 June – Health Secretary Humza Yousaf says he "regrets" a claim he made that 10 children had been hospitalised "because of Covid" may have caused undue alarm. Doctors have said there have been no rise in admission from children with COVID.
- 5 June – Much of mainland Scotland (apart from the Central Belt) is moved to level 1 restrictions.
- 6 June – A health report recommends Scotland should focus on the "huge gap" in global vaccine rollout rather than vaccinating teenagers.
- 7 June – The hospitality sector describes the decision to create a Euro 2020 Zone in Glasgow that will allow up to 6,000 fans to gather as an "absolute slap", fearing it will mean a return to level 3 restrictions for the city.
- 8 June –
  - First Minister Nicola Sturgeon says Scotland will vaccinate those aged 12–15 as quickly as possible should it be recommended by experts.
  - Education Secretary Shirley-Anne Somerville gives a "cast-iron guarantee" that no young person will be further disadvantaged by the 2021 school assessments.
  - Passengers touring the UK on the cruise ship MSC Virtuosa are told they cannot disembark in Scotland due to the country's COVID restrictions.
- 9 June –
  - The Scottish Government draws up plans to extend the emergency COVID powers to March 2022.
  - Figures from Public Health Scotland show that cases of COVID among children are now at their highest since the start of the outbreak, with 1,064 cases recorded as of 7 June.
- 10 June – With scientific advice that adults under the age of 40 should not be offered the Oxford vaccine, Health Secretary Humza Yousaf says supplies of the Pfizer vaccine will be "tight" in the coming few weeks and could hamper the vaccine rollout.
- 11 June – The UK Statistics Authority has said that Health Secretary Humza Yousaf's claim that ten children were in hospital with COVID is inaccurate.
- 12 June – NHS Tayside limits hospital visitors to one per patient as COVID cases rise in Dundee.
- 13 June –
  - The Scottish Government urges anyone over the age of 40 to get their second vaccination as soon as they can, and encourages them to seek an earlier appointment if the second jab is scheduled for more than eight weeks after the first.
  - Health Secretary Humza Yousaf says the impact of Indian variant COVID on the NHS will depend on when Scotland's restrictions move to level zero.
- 14 June – Trials of a third booster COVID vaccine begin in Glasgow.
- 15 June – First Minister of Scotland Nicola Sturgeon says that Scotland's move to the lowest level of COVID restrictions is likely to be delayed by three weeks. The change had been scheduled for 28 June. Leaders in the hospitality sector have warned of "another lost summer" if the delay goes ahead.
- 17 June – Official statistics have shown a 41% increase in the number of deaths in the community in Scotland since the start of the pandemic.
- 18 June –
  - The Scottish Government has issued more than 98,000 vaccination certificates since the scheme was launched.
  - First Minister Nicola Sturgeon announces a travel ban between Scotland and parts of Greater Manchester and Salford from Monday 21 June because of rising COVID cases in the area, a move that sparks anger from Mayor of Greater Manchester Andy Burnham, who accuses the Scottish Government of "hypocrisy".
- 21 June –
  - First Minister Nicola Sturgeon defends her decision to announce a travel ban for Greater Manchester by saying she has a "duty" to protect Scotland.
  - A "system error" has led to 8,000 invitations for second vaccinations being sent out too early. Health Secretary Humza Yousaf says the people concerned will be contacted and offered alternative later appointments.
- 22 June – First Minister Nicola Sturgeon sets a date of 9 August for the lifting of all COVID restrictions in Scotland, while delaying the next tranche of changes (the move from level 1 to level zero for the Scottish mainland) from 28 June to 19 July.
- 23 June –
  - The highest number of daily COVID cases since the start of mass testing – 2,969 – is reported for Scotland, with a gender gap having opened up in recent days as two thirds of those aged 15 to 44 testing positive for the illness are male.
  - EasyJet suspends plans to introduce flights between Manchester and Edinburgh and Aberdeen following the Scottish Government's ban on travel between Manchester and Scotland.
- 27 June – National Clinical Director Professor Jason Leitch suggests stadiums could operate at full capacity on 10 August if the route map for lifting restrictions in Scotland stays on track.
- 28 June –
  - The number of positive daily COVID cases rises above 3,000, with 3,285 cases recorded. No deaths are recorded for the same period. First Minister Nicola Sturgeon expresses her concern over the rise, but says there is good news from the vaccination programme.
  - The rules for weddings and funerals are relaxed; live entertainment is permitted at weddings, while suppliers are not counted among the number of attendees and a person walking the bride down the aisle does not have to wear a face covering; at funerals a coffin can be carried by people from more than one household.
- 29 June – Health Secretary, Humza Yousaf, announces that the ban on non-essential travel between Scotland and the north west of England will be lifted from midnight.
- 30 June –
  - A total of 1,991 COVID cases in Scotland have been linked to Euro 2020 football matches, with two thirds of them stemming from Scotland's game against England at Wembley Stadium on 18 June.
  - Malta, Madeira and the Balearic Islands are added to the green travel list.

=== July 2021 ===
- 1 July – The number of daily COVID cases in Scotland passes 4,000 for the first time.
- 2 July –
  - After Midlothian Council records the second highest number of COVID cases in Scotland the decision is taken to revoke the licence for the 2021 Tough Mudder Scotland event, scheduled to begin the following day.
  - NHS Grampian says that a surge in COVID cases in its area means it is unable to contact trace every person who may have come into contact with an infected person.
  - GPs who say they are at "full capacity" express their concerns about having to administer booster COVID jabs.
- 3 July – Contact tracers are to prioritise contacting people where there is a "high risk" of transmitting COVID to alleviate pressure on the system. Those deemed to be high risk will be phoned while low risk people will be sent a text message.
- 4 July – BBC Scotland's Sunday Show reports that less than half of those who have downloaded Scotland's contact tracing app Protect Scotland are actively using it.
- 5 July – World Health Organization figures have placed Scotland as one of the top COVID hotspots in Europe, something National Clinical Director Jason Leitch attributes to a lack of "natural immunity" in the population.
- 6 July –
  - The Scottish Government says that Scotland plans to move to level zero restrictions on 19 July, with the remainder of COVID restrictions lifted on 9 August, despite an increase in the number of cases.
  - The Federation of Master Builders warns of a shortage of building materials because of COVID that is leading to an increase in the price of building projects.
- 7 July –
  - First Minister Nicola Sturgeon warns that the dates for lifting COVID restrictions in Scotland are "not set in stone".
  - NHS Grampian places two more hospitals on "code black" status as they reach full capacity following a rise in COVID cases in the area and consequently a rise in hospital admissions.
- 8 July – First Minister Nicola Sturgeon says Scotland's recent COVID surge may be levelling off.
- 9 July- NHS Tayside urges both aged between 16 and 20 to get vaccinated following the rise in admissions into intensive care.
- 10 July – official figures show that the rate of covert cases in Scotland for the week ending 3 July was one in 100, Arise from one in 150 the previous week, and the highest since 16 January.
- 11 July – it is reported that GPs in Scotland are firefighting to cope with the non-Covid backlog of patients.
- 12 July – losses at Scotland's airports have urged the Scottish government to relax the rules regarding quarantine to bring them into line with those in England, which are set to change from 19 July.
- 13 July – Scottish first Minister Nicola Sturgeon announces that Scotland will move to level zero restrictions from 19 July, but that the wearing of face coverings will remain mandatory for some time. Deputy first Minister John Swinney suggests that they could be compulsory until Christmas.
- 14 July – Scotland records 11 COVID deaths in its latest figures, the highest number since 30 March.
- 16 July –
  - Figures from the Office for National Statistics indicate one in 90 people in Scotland is infected with COVID.
  - Two of Scotland's football clubs are given permission to have spectators for upcoming matches. Celtic will be allowed 9,000 fans at their UEFA Champions League game against Midtjylland on 20 July, and Aberdeen 5,655 for their Europa Conference League match with Hacken on 22 July.
- 17 July –
  - Mass testing is under way at HMP Perth after 97 prisoners tested positive for COVID-19.
  - With the mass vaccination centre at Glasgow's SSE Hydro set to close, opposition politicians urge the Scottish Government to keep it operating. The clinic is being closed in order to prepare the venue for a UN Climate Change Conference.
- 18 July – With all adults having been offered a vaccination, it is reported that a third of younger people in Scotland remain unvaccinated.
- 19 July –
  - Scotland moves to level zero restrictions, allowing larger numbers of people to meet up indoors, as well as attending weddings and funerals.
  - The MS Island Sky becomes the first cruise ship to dock in Scotland since the onset of the pandemic when it arrives at Lerwick Harbour.
- 20 July – Rangers are given permission to have 17,000 spectators at Ibrox Stadium for a Scottish Premiership match against Livingston on 31 July.
- 21 July –
  - Figures from National Records of Scotland show COVID was mentioned on 47 death certificates in the week of 12–18 July, a rise of 16 on the previous week.
  - The Scottish Government has clarified its position on COVID tests for school pupils after official minutes said they would be required before the beginning of the autumn term. Their position is that the tests will not be mandatory.
- 22 July –
  - The Scottish Government unveils plans to make critical workers such as health and care staff exempt from having to self-isolate. Supermarket workers and airline staff may also be added to the list.
  - Scotland records 22 new COVID deaths, the highest daily number for four months.
- 23 July –
  - Figures from the Scottish Government indicate that 50,000 people have stopped using the contact tracing app Protect Scotland during July.
  - Critical staff in the health, food and transport sectors can apply for exemption from self-isolation under a scheme launched by the Scottish Government.
- 27 July – First Minister Nicola Sturgeon says there are "strong grounds for hope" that most COVID restrictions in Scotland will be removed in August.
- 29 July – Figures from HM Revenue and Customs show that 141,500 workers in Scotland were on the Job Retention Scheme at the end of June 2021, down from 175,300 at the end of the previous month.
- 30 July – Claire Herriot, who flew home to Glasgow from Turkey to see her terminally ill father has been exempted from hotel quarantine after criticising the rules that would prevent her from saying goodbye. She had originally been told she would not be required to quarantine, but found herself facing the prospect often days in a hotel when she arrived back in Scotland.
- 31 July – A digital vaccination certificate is reportedly in development to replace the paper certificate, with the Scottish Government having awarded a £600,000 contract to a Danish firm to develop the scheme.

=== August 2021 ===
- 1 August – The Scottish Governmentannounces plans to vaccinate thousands of teenagers with health conditions that class them as vulnerable before the start of theautumn school term. Around 4,000 children aged between12 and 17 fall into this category, with term set to begin on 16 August.
- 3 August –
  - First Minister Nicola Sturgeon confirms most COVID restrictions in Scotland will be lifted from 9 August.
  - Sturgeon confirms the number of people allowed to attend football matches will rise from 2,000 to 5,000 from 9 August, but clubs wishing to host more will need to apply to their local authority for permission to do so.
  - Sturgeon confirms that the wholesale self-isolation of entire classes of schoolchildren following a positive COVID test among their number will no longer be "routine".
- 4 August – National Clinical Director Professor Jason Leitch confirms that drinking at the bar will be allowed once most COVID restrictions are lifted in Scotland from Monday 9 August.
- 5 August –
  - The Scottish Ambulance Service has drafted in firefighters to drive ambulances because of high levels of demand and staff shortages caused by the pandemic.
  - It is reported that strict conditions over director pay and bonuses have been attached to emergency COVID loans issued to Scottish Professional Football League clubs.
- 6 August –
  - Scotland's R number has shrunk to below 1 for the first time since May 2021, with it estimated to be between 0.7 and 0.9 in the week to 2 August.
  - The Edinburgh Fringe Festival returns, having been cancelled in 2020 because of COVID.
  - New guidelines issued ahead of the lifting of most COVID restrictions in Scotland on Monday 9 August state that face masks can be removed for drinking, dancing and dining in a hospitality setting.
- 7 August –
  - Drop in vaccination clinics begin for 16 and 17-year-olds in Scotland.
  - Ahead of the lifting of COVID restrictions in Scotland, Health Secretary Humza Yousaf confirms that physical distancing will remain in healthcare settings such as doctors' surgeries, dental practices and hospitals.
- 8 August – Scotland unveils its largest ever winter vaccination programme, with four million people set to be offered the flu jab over the coming winter.
- 9 August –
  - The bulk of pandemic related restrictions are removed in Scotland. Rules that remain include compulsory mask wearing in some locations and restrictions surrounding the administration of schools in the early part of the new academic year.
  - Children under the age of 12 are no longer legally required to wear face coverings in public places.
  - Nightclubs are among the venues allowed to reopen following the lifting of restrictions.
- 10 August – Higher results are published in Scotland, with 87.3% achieving A to C grades.
- 11 August – A BBC Scotland report highlights the pressure being placed on hospitals as they attempt to catch up on lengthy waiting lists brought about by the COVID crisis.
- 12 August – The Scottish Government announces that doctors and dentists will be awarded a 3% pay rise in recognition of their efforts during the pandemic. The rise is also to be backdated to 1 April 2021.
- 13 August –
  - Four health boards have cancelled non-urgent procedures and outpatient appointments amid rising pressure on the health service from COVID.
  - A BBC News report highlights the potential difficulties of Scotland's COVID certificate system. While other parts of the UK are using an app through which people can scan a QR code to obtain their COVID certificate, Scotland is relying on a paper-based system, which may not be accepted by some countries.
- 15 August – Ferry operator Caledonian MacBrayne cancels its Campbeltown to Ardrossan service after two crew members tested positive for COVID. The MV Caledonian Isles will be deep cleaned during the suspension of crossings.
- 16 August – As schools in Scotland begin to return for the new academic year, Education Secretary Shirley-Anne Somerville says that face coverings in classrooms will be scrapped "as soon as possible".
- 17 August – The Scottish Government launches a consultation process making some of its emergency COVID powers permanent. The Coronavirus (Scotland) Act 2020 is due to expire in March 2022, but the Scottish Government would like to retain some powers, such as the ability to impose lockdowns, close schools, make it more difficult for landlords to evict tenants and release prisoners early.
- 18 August –
  - Scotland's spending deficit doubled to £36.3bn during 2020 because of the decrease in revenue due to the COVID-19 pandemic, figures have shown.
  - The Scottish Government confirms that secondary school examinations will go ahead as normal in 2022 as long as it is safe for them to do so.
- 20 August – ScotRail publishes plans to cut 300 train services from its daily timetable to make adjustments to new post-COVID travel patterns.
- 22 August – Education Secretary Shirley-Anne Somerville is self-isolating after testing positive for COVID.
- 23 August –
  - Figures show that 40% of 16 and 17-year-olds in Scotland have had their first COVID vaccination.
  - Edinburgh University's Professor Linda Bault, a behavioural scientist, is appointed as a scientific adviser to the Scottish Government, taking up the position on 27 September.
- 24 August –
  - As Scotland reports a record 4,323 daily cases, First Minister Nicola Sturgeon says she cannot rule out the reintroduction of some COVID measures, but says these would be as limited and proportional as possible.
  - The Scottish Government announces plans to hold a separate public inquiry into the handling of the COVID crisis in Scotland, expected to be at the end of the year.
  - The National Union of Students has urged the Scottish Government to end a postcode lottery of quarantine fees for international students. Around 3,000 are expected to arrive from red list countries, with their £2,300 hotel bills covered by some universities, but not all.
- 25 August – Scotland's Deputy First Minister, John Swinney, says the surge in cases in Scotland is partly due to the return of schools.
- 27 August – Scotland records 6,835 new COVID cases, the highest daily increase to date and the third in a week, but First Minister Nicola Sturgeon says the Scottish Government is not considering the introduction of a circuit-breaker lockdown.
- 28 August – As large scale events are allowed to resume in Scotland, National Clinical Director Jason Leitch emphasises the importance of being vigilant, both for the public and the organisers of events.
- 29 August –
  - Another record number of daily COVID cases is recorded, with 7,113 new cases reported. The news comes as Health Secretary Humza Yousaf says that the NHS in Scotland is facing a "perfect storm".
  - First Minister Nicola Sturgeon self-isolates after being identified as a close contact of someone who tested positive for COVID. She is released from the requirement the following day after providing a negative test.
- 30 August – Figures indicate COVID cases have virtually doubled each week since the lifting of restrictions, leading to an increase in hospitalisations, and prompting National Clinical Director Professor Jason Leitch to suggest a "reverse gear" may be needed with some restrictions.
- 31 August –
  - Death figures released by National Records of Scotland appear to show the pandemic has widened the gap between those living in deprived areas of Scotland and those living in more affluent areas, with deaths registered in 2020 for deprived areas double those of other areas.
  - BBC News reports that at least half of the pupils at an East Dunbartonshire school were absent due to COVID-related issues.

=== September 2021 ===
- 1 September –
  - First Minister Nicola Sturgeon confirms that vaccine passports will be required for people who wish to enter nightclubs or attend large events. The practicality of the plans are questioned by the Scottish Professional Football League, which says they could have unintended consequences.
  - The health charity Chest Heart and Stroke Scotland says that thousands of patients are not being referred to Long COVID clinics by the NHS because of bureaucracy.
- 2 September –
  - School attendance figures for 1 September show over 32,000 pupils were absent from school – 6,471 because they had tested positive for COVID and 25,622 who were self-isolating.
  - Health Secretary Humza Yousaf says the benefits of Scotland's planned COVID passport scheme for large events outweigh the concerns and are preferable to another lockdown.
- 4 September – Pride celebrations return to Glasgow following their cancellation in 2020.
- 5 September – BBC News reports that opposition to a vaccine passport scheme in Scotland is growing, with Scottish Labour saying it will not support the proposals, which are scheduled to be debated in the Scottish Parliament on 9 September.
- 7 September –
  - First Minister Nicola Sturgeon confirms that work will resume on plans for a second independence referendum, which had been suspended during the COVID crisis.
  - Prime Minister Boris Johnson announces a new Health and Social Care Tax to help address shortfalls in care and the patient backlog; the Scottish NHS will get £1.1bn from the tax each year.
- 8 September – Scottish First Minister Nicola Sturgeon says the rate of COVID infections in Scotland may be slowing down, and that hopefully no new restrictions will be needed to control the surge.
- 9 September –
  - The Scottish Parliament votes to approve vaccine passports, meaning adults must be fully vaccinated to enter nightclubs and major events from 1 October.
  - Scottish Comedian Janey Godley is dropped from a Scottish Government health campaign urging people to wear face coverings and take lateral flow tests after historic tweets were published in which she made derogatory comments about a number of black performers.
  - Dr Lynn McCallum, chief executive of NHS Borders, urges people to "be kind" to staff as the health trust faces "unprecedented challenges" at a time when they are busier than the "busiest winter". Her comments come after health staff faced abuse both in person and through social media from people frustrated by treatment delays.
- 10 September –
  - Pauline Howie, chief executive of the Scottish Ambulance Service apologises for the long waiting times faced by those who call an ambulance and says the service is facing "unprecedented pressure" because of COVID.
  - Figures estimate that one in 45 people has COVID in Scotland, the highest number since records began.
  - First Minister Nicola Sturgeon says her plans to hold a second independence referendum in two years are realistic despite the difficulties of COVID.
- 11 September – Jamie McNamee of the Unite union which represents ambulance staff calls for the Army to set up temporary wards outside Accident and Emergency Departments to help deal with pressure at hospitals.
- 12 September –
  - Health figures indicate there are 1,019 people in hospital with COVID-related conditions, the ninth consecutive day the figure has risen.
  - First Minister Nicola Sturgeon says that an independence referendum will not be held until all restrictions on daily life in Scotland have been lifted.
  - Neil Doncaster, chief executive of the Scottish Professional Football League, raises concerns about a COVID passport scheme, saying it would be "very difficult" to check that all fans attending a football match had got a vaccine passport.
- 13 September – Health Secretary Humza Yousaf suggests that Scotland's COVID passport scheme may employ spot checks at large-scale events such as football matches.
- 15 September –
  - It is revealed that two thirds of the 6,780 travellers referred to Police Scotland by Public Health Scotland for potential breach of quarantine regulations were not investigated after the force decided to "weed out" cases.
  - Health Secretary Humza Yousaf is warned he could put lives in danger after urging people to "think twice" before calling an ambulance and only to do so if "absolutely critical".
- 16 September –
  - The Scottish Government asks the Ministry of Defence for military assistance for Scotland's ambulance service after First Minister Nicola Sturgeon describes the situation as being the most challenging set of circumstances in history because of COVID.
  - National Clinical Director Professor Jason Leitch confirms there is no evidence that recent large scale events have led to a spike in COVID cases.
- 17 September –
  - Pauline Howie, chief executive of the Scottish Ambulance Service, confirms that military personnel are to be drafted in to drive ambulances.
  - The latest Office for National Statistics figures for the week ending 11 September indicate Scotland to still have the highest COVID rate in the UK, with an estimated one in 45 people with the virus, the second week this has been the case.
- 18 September – Following changes to the traffic lights system in England, Scotland announces that the green and amber lists will merge, but unlike England there will be no changes to the rules regarding COVID tests for returning travellers.
- 19 September – Dr Sandesh Gulhane, a GP and Conservative Member of the Scottish Parliament, warns that demand for GPs is double pre-pandemic levels and the situation is likely to worsen.
- 20 September –
  - Tourism industry leaders are warning that strict COVID testing rules for international travellers could place the next tourist season at "serious risk".
  - Senior doctors have said that 1,000 extra acute treatment beds are needed in Scotland's NHS to help relieve the "unrelenting pressure" facing emergency departments.
- 21 September –
  - First Minister Nicola Sturgeon outlines details of when and where vaccine passports should be used, and urges venues to use "common sense" when checking them.
  - The Ministry of Defence confirms the deployment of 114 military personnel to help the Scottish Ambulance Service with non-essential driving and support work.
- 22 September – The Night Time Industries Association Scotland (NTIA), a group representing night clubs in Scotland, confirms plans for a legal challenge against the Scottish Government's decision to introduce vaccine passports from October, saying there are "serious flaws" with the scheme.
- 24 September –
  - Scotland records 50 COVID-related deaths, the largest daily total since 27 February, bringing the number of overall deaths to 8,514.
  - The Scottish Government confirms fully vaccinated travellers returning to Scotland will no longer be required to take a pre-flight COVID test. Scotland will also align itself with the rest of the UK with regard to post-return testing.
  - Military personnel arrive in Scotland ready to begin driving ambulances over the coming weekend.
- 26 September – Secretary of State for Scotland Alistair Jack confirms that military personnel will be available to drive ambulances beyond the initially agreed two-month period.
- 28 September –
  - With vaccine passports set to be introduced on 1 October, First Minister Nicola Sturgeon announces there will be a "grace period" before their enforcement on 18 October.
  - Jillian Evans, head of health intelligence at NHS Grampian, tells the BBC Scotland is "nudging towards" herd immunity in spite of continuing high levels of COVID.
  - Figures released by Police Scotland show a 20% increase in bicycle thefts during lockdown as demand for bicycles increased.
- 29 September –
  - UKHospitality, the trade body representing the hospitality industry, warns the public is not ready for Scotland's COVID passport scheme.
  - Dr Lee Allan, a consultant at Aberdeen Royal Infirmary, tells the BBC the majority of intensive care patients with COVID are young and unvaccinated.
  - NHS Western Isles urge people living in the Western Isles to follow COVID prevention measures after a spike in cases; 23 were reported the previous day.
- 30 September – legal challenge against Scotland's vaccine passport scheme is rejected, meaning it will begin the following day. The NHS Scotland Covid Status app is subsequently launched at 5.30pm but runs into technical difficulties within hours of going live.

=== October 2021 ===
- 1 October –
  - Data obtained by the BBC indicates that more than half of elderly patients discharged from hospital to 200 care homes were not tested for COVID beforehand.
  - It is reported that a lack of care staff is fuelling the crisis in Scotland's health service because it means patients cannot be discharged from hospital if they need ongoing care.
  - Scotland's Health Secretary Humza Yousaf says he "regrets any inconvenience caused" by the vaccine passport app and suggests it could be fixed "in a matter of hours, but it may be a matter of days".
  - NHS Greater Glasgow and Clyde and NHS Lanarkshire announce they will no longer be scheduling drop in vaccination clinics. However, following criticism over the decision, drop in clinics are reinstated by both health authorities the following day.
- 2 October – The Scottish Government says the "teething problems" with its vaccine passport app should be resolved within a couple of days.
- 4 October – Deputy First Minister John Swinney says the country's vaccine passport app is up and running and functioning well.
- 5 October –
  - The Scottish Government unveils a £300m financial package for the health service, designed to get it through the upcoming and "extremely challenging" winter.
  - First Minister Nicola Sturgeon apologises for the problems experienced during the launch of Scotland's vaccine passport app.
  - A Public Health Scotland report into the February 2020 outbreak of COVID at a Nike conference in Edinburgh finds it did not lead to community transmission of the virus.
- 9 October – Public Health Scotland confirms that 551 COVID cases have been linked to September's TRNSMT festival held in Glasgow, and attended by around 50,000 people.
- 12 October – The latest figures for accident and emergency waiting times show that 7,212 of the 25,123 people attending A&E departments in the week ending 3 October were not admitted, discharged or transferred four hours after arriving, setting another new record.
- 13 October – Figures published by National Records of Scotland show 1,353 deaths from all causes were registered in the week to 10 October, a figure 30% higher than the pre-COVID average.
- 15 October – Military personnel are to be drafted in to help at hospitals in Lanarkshire and the Borders region ahead of the winter to help relieve expected pressure on the health service in these areas.
- 18 October –
  - Scotland's vaccine passport scheme becomes enforceable by law.
  - NHS Grampian becomes the latest health board to request military help.
- 19 October –
  - The Scottish Government decides against lifting the requirement for face coverings to be worn in secondary schools, saying it will allow more time for 12–15-year-olds to be vaccinated.
  - Opposition MSPs have accused the Scottish Government of pushing back the booster vaccine programme for some groups of people as the NHS website says booster vaccines can be booked from mid-November; a statement on 14 September rom the Scottish Government had said they would be available from October.
- 20 October – NHS Forth Valley apologises after figures show just 41% of its Accident and Emergency patients were seen within four hours in the first full week of October.
- 22 October –
  - NHS Lanarkshire moves to the "highest risk level" as its three hospitals reach maximum capacity.
  - Figures from Public Health Scotland show that 117,627 12–15-year-olds in Scotland have had their first vaccine so far, equivalent to 50.2%.
- 23 October – NHS Greater Glasgow urges patients only to attend A&E if an issue is "life-threatening".
- 24 October – Health Secretary, Humza Yousaf says there is "absolutely a risk" of COVID cases rising after the COP26 summit in Glasgow, which will be attended by 25,000 people.
- 25 October –
  - The Scottish Hospitality Group, the industry body that represents the night-time sector in Scotland, describes the first weekend of COVID passports as an "unmitigated disaster" during which 550 people were turned away from venues and staff received abuse from revellers for turning them away.
  - Figures show that around 100,000 people in the top priority groups for vaccination are still waiting for their booster vaccine more than six months after their second jab, with 511,807 of the 616,000 people in the group having received the booster.
- 26 October –
  - BBC News reports on a major study into long COVID in Scotland which will attempt to forecast who may need treatment. The study will involve sending a text message to everyone who tested positive for the illness, and some who tested negative, asking them to log any symptoms.
  - Figures from Public Health Scotland show that dental treatments fell by 3.5 million during 2020 when compared to the previous year, equivalent to a 75% fall.
- 27 October – As it is estimated that as many as 100,000 climate protesters could be present at the forthcoming COP26 conference in Glasgow, Edinburgh University's Professor Linda Bauld cites them as the biggest cause for concern of there being a COVID outbreak because of the conference.
- 30 October – Ahead of the COP26 conference in Glasgow, First Minister Nicola Sturgeon urges protesters to respect Glasgow and the health service by following COVID regulations.

=== November 2021 ===
- 2 November – Health Secretary Humza Yousaf confirms 120 military personnel are to be drafted in to help with COVID vaccine and flu jab deployment in Scotland.
- 3 November –
  - A special Crown Office department established to investigate COVID-related deaths in hospitals in Scotland is investigating 827 cases, it is reported.
  - New Scottish Government proposals will see non-emergency A&E patients being redirected to other areas of the NHS.
- 5 November – Edinburgh nightclub Lulu's confirms it is no longer requiring customers to show official proof of COVID vaccinations after experiencing a reduction in footfall.
- 9 November – Deputy First Minister John Swinney suggests the COVID pass scheme may be extended to the hospitality and leisure sectors in order to prevent a return to lockdown in the event of another wave of COVID.
- 12 November – The Ministry of Defence approves the extension of military help for NHS Lanarkshire and NHS Borders until December. The help from the MoD had been scheduled to expire on 10 November.
- 16 November – First Minister Nicola Sturgeon says Scotland's vaccine passport scheme could be extended to include cinemas, theatres and some hospitality venues from 6 December, with a final decision to be made on 23 November. Deputy First Minister John Swinney says Scotland can expect a "normal Christmas".
- 17 November – Pubs and restaurants fear an "avalanche of cancellations" if the COVID passport scheme is extended before Christmas.
- 19 November – A document prepared by the Scottish Government warns that Scotland is facing a choice between extending its vaccine passport scheme and lockdown-style restrictions in order to "suppress the virus further".
- 21 November – Scottish Conservative leader Douglas Ross urges the Scottish Government to provide evidence that vaccine passports help to stem the spread of COVID.
- 23 November – First Minister Nicola Sturgeon announces that Scotland's vaccine passport scheme will not be extended to cover cinemas, theatres and other hospitality venues following a slight fall in the number of cases, while from 6 December people will no longer need to provide proof of vaccination to enter venues already covered by the scheme, and provide a negative lateral flow test instead.
- 25 November – Data produced by the World Health Organization indicates the Scotland's vaccine programme prevented more than 27,000 COVID-related deaths.
- 26 November – First Minister Nicola Sturgeon says it is not time to "press the panic button" over the new Omicron COVID variant discovered in southern Africa, but that further investigation is needed.
- 27 November – Health Secretary Humza Yousaf says that people in Scotland should act as though the Omicron COVID variant is already present after two cases are discovered in England.
- 28 November –
  - First Minister Nicola Sturgeon suggests travel restrictions may need to tightened in the coming days because of Omicron variant COVID.
  - Public health expert Professor Linda Bauld suggests the gap between second vaccines and booster vaccines may be shortened in order to tackle the Omicron COVID variant.
- 29 November – First Minister Nicola Sturgeon urges people to "test much more" as it is confirmed six of the 11 cases of Omicron variant COVID were found in Scotland.
- 30 November – First Minister Nicola Sturgeon confirms that all nine cases of the Omicron COVID variant found in Scotland are linked to a single event on 20 November. All nine people tested positive on 23 November and have been self-isolating since then.

=== December 2021 ===
- 1 December – The Scottish Government apologises after some people over the age of 40 reported being turned away for their booster vaccines, and says updated guidelines have been issued to all of Scotland's health boards.
- 2 December – Technical problems that led to some people being turned away for the COVID booster vaccinations in Scotland have been resolved, First Minister Nicola Sturgeon confirms.
- 3 December – A total of 25 Omicron variant COVID cases have been reported in Scotland, with six linked to a Steps concert held at Glasgow Hydro on 22 November.
- 4 December – GPs warn that new COVID rules that require patients to be assessed for respiratory and non-respiratory treatment pathways will leave less time for face-to-face appointments. The rules are scheduled to come into force on 13 December.
- 5 December – A further 18 cases of Omicron variant COVID are detected in Scotland, bringing the total to 48.
- 6 December –
  - New rules come into force requiring people to provide a negative COVID test before entering clubs, concerts or large events. Deputy First Minister advises Scotland's population to take a lateral flow test every time they leave home.
  - A primary school in Renfrewshire is forced to close for a week following a suspected case of Omicron variant COVID.
- 7 December – First Minister Nicola Sturgeon announces plans to review COVID rules on a daily basis amid concerns about the rise in numbers of cases of the Omicron variant; a total of 99 have now been identified in Scotland.
- 8 December – The Stereophonics have postponed their December concerts at Cardiff's Principality Stadium amid concerns over the Omicron variant.
- 9 December – Public Health Scotland urges people to cancel Christmas parties, claiming a number of Omicron cases are linked to Christmas parties.
- 10 December –
  - First Minister Nicola Sturgeon says Scotland faces a "tsunami" of Omicron cases with it likely to become the dominant variant of COVID within days.
  - Sturgeon announces changes to self-isolation rules from the following day, requiring anyone living with someone who tests positive for COVID to self-isolate for ten days, while other contacts can stop self-isolating once they have received a negative PCR test or if they have had two vaccine doses.
  - The hospitality industry reports "non-stop cancellations" following Public Health Scotland's advice to people to cancel their Christmas parties.
- 11 December – Deputy First Minister John Swinney says the Scottish Government is "wrestling with the challenge" of the Omicron variant and that fresh restrictions may be required in the coming days.
- 13 December –
  - Following Boris Johnson's announcement of the extension of the booster programme, Scotland's booster programme is extended to over-30s in Scotland, with those aged 18–29 scheduled to become eligible within the coming days.
  - First Minister Nicola Sturgeon confirms schools in Scotland will not close early for Christmas.
- 14 December –
  - First Minister Nicola Sturgeon urges people to limit their gatherings to three households in the run up to Christmas.
  - A large rave that would have closed Edinburgh's largest vaccination centre for a week has been cancelled.
- 15 December –
  - The Scottish hospitality sector estimates it has taken a "£1bn hit" because of cancelled events in the run up to Christmas.
  - Health figures indicate 55,000 boosters were administered on 14 December, bringing the total number to 2,254,406.
  - Deputy First Minister John Swinney warns that further restrictions may be required before Christmas.
- 16 December –
  - In a letter to Prime Minister Boris Johnson, First Minister Nicola Sturgeon warns further restrictions on what she terms "high risk" sectors are unavoidable.
  - The Scottish Government issues new guidelines for hospitality and retail businesses advising the return of social distancing and one-way systems for shops and supermarkets; the guidelines are effective from 12.01am the following day.
  - Sturgeon announces that mass vaccination centres are to open at Hampden Park stadium in Glasgow and the Edinburgh International Conference Centre.
  - Sturgeon tells the Scottish Parliament the Omicron variant will become the dominant strain of COVID in Scotland by the following day.
  - Deacon Blue and Amy Macdonald both announce the cancellation of concerts in Scotland amid concerns about Omicron.
- 17 December –
  - The Omicron variant is believed to have replaced the Delta variant as the most dominant variant in Scotland.
  - The entertainment industry in Scotland warns that music venues are in danger of closing because of cancelled bookings if they do not receive financial help.
- 19 December –
  - The Scottish Government is to receive an extra £220m from the Treasury to help with dealing with COVID.
  - Health officials have suggested tougher curbs may be introduced around the new year.
  - A total of 64,081 boosters have been administered in the latest available daily figures, the largest so far.
- 20 December –
  - First Minister Nicola Sturgeon says guidelines for Christmas Day will not change.
  - National Clinical Director Professor Jason Leitch says modelling suggests Omicron variant cases of COVID will peak in late January or early February.
  - ScotRail cancels 118 of its train services, citing COVID among staff members as a reason for doing so.
- 21 December – New measures are announced for Scotland effective from Boxing Day (26 December) that limit the number of spectators at outdoor sporting events to 500, and indoor events such as concerts to 200 if seated and 100 if standing. Pubs and restaurants must also offer table service only. Edinburgh's Hogmanay Street Party is also cancelled.
- 22 December –
  - New COVID rules in Scotland have led to a raft of cancelled events, BBC News reports.
  - The Scottish Premiership brings forward its winter break from 4 January to 27 December.
  - Opposition parties are calling on the Scottish Government to follow England by reducing the period of self-isolation required following a positive COVID test from ten to seven days.
- 23 December –
  - People are being urged to treat common illnesses at home rather than calling Scotland's NHS helpline, NHS24, as it faces staff shortages due to COVID absences.
  - Scottish Conservative leader Douglas Ross criticises First Minister Nicola Sturgeon for being "too cautious" over self-isolation rules, which have led to problems with under staffing in the hospitality sector.
- 24 December –
  - National Clinical Director Professor Jason Leitch urges people to enjoy Christmas, but to be "cautious".
  - The number of daily COVID cases in Scotland hits its highest point since August, with 7,076 new cases reported.
- 26 December – Fresh restrictions are brought in as an attempt to halt the spread of the Omicron variant, including the cancellation of all large events.
- 27 December –
  - One metre physical distancing measures are reintroduced for the hospitality and leisure sectors, while hospitality must provide a table service only. Nightclubs must also close for a period of at least three weeks.
  - Vaccination centres reopen in a bid to get 80% of the population to receive their booster vaccine before the new year.
- 28 December – As a further 9,360 cases are reported for Scotland, First Minister Nicola Sturgeon warns the situation could get worse.
- 29 December –
  - A further 15,849 COVID cases are reported for Scotland, the highest daily figure so far.
  - Scots are warned not to travel to England as a way of circumventing Scotland's tighter COVID rules that have seen New Year celebrations cancelled north of the border.
  - Around 100 ScotRail services are cancelled with the company currently short of 300 staff who are self-isolating.
- 30 December –
  - The Scottish branch of the doctors trade union, the British Medical Association, says it backs a "cautious" approach as the Scottish Government considers whether to reduce the period required for self-isolation following exe a positive COVID test from ten to seven days.
- 31 December –
  - The latest figures from the Scottish Government show more than three quarters of adults in Scotland have received their booster vaccine.
  - Dr Kenneth Donaldson, chief executive of NHS Dumfries and Galloway issues a "cry for help" over staff shortages related to absences due to self-isolation.

== See also ==
- Timeline of the COVID-19 pandemic in Scotland (2020)
- Timeline of the COVID-19 pandemic in Scotland (2022)
- Timeline of the COVID-19 pandemic in the United Kingdom (January–June 2021)
- Timeline of the COVID-19 pandemic in the United Kingdom (July–December 2021)
- Timeline of the COVID-19 pandemic in England (2021)
- Timeline of the COVID-19 pandemic in Wales (2021)
- Timeline of the COVID-19 pandemic in Northern Ireland (2021)
- History of the COVID-19 pandemic in the United Kingdom
