= Linda Bauld =

Scottish scientist (born 1970)

Linda Bauld OBE FRCPE FRSE FAcSS FFPH
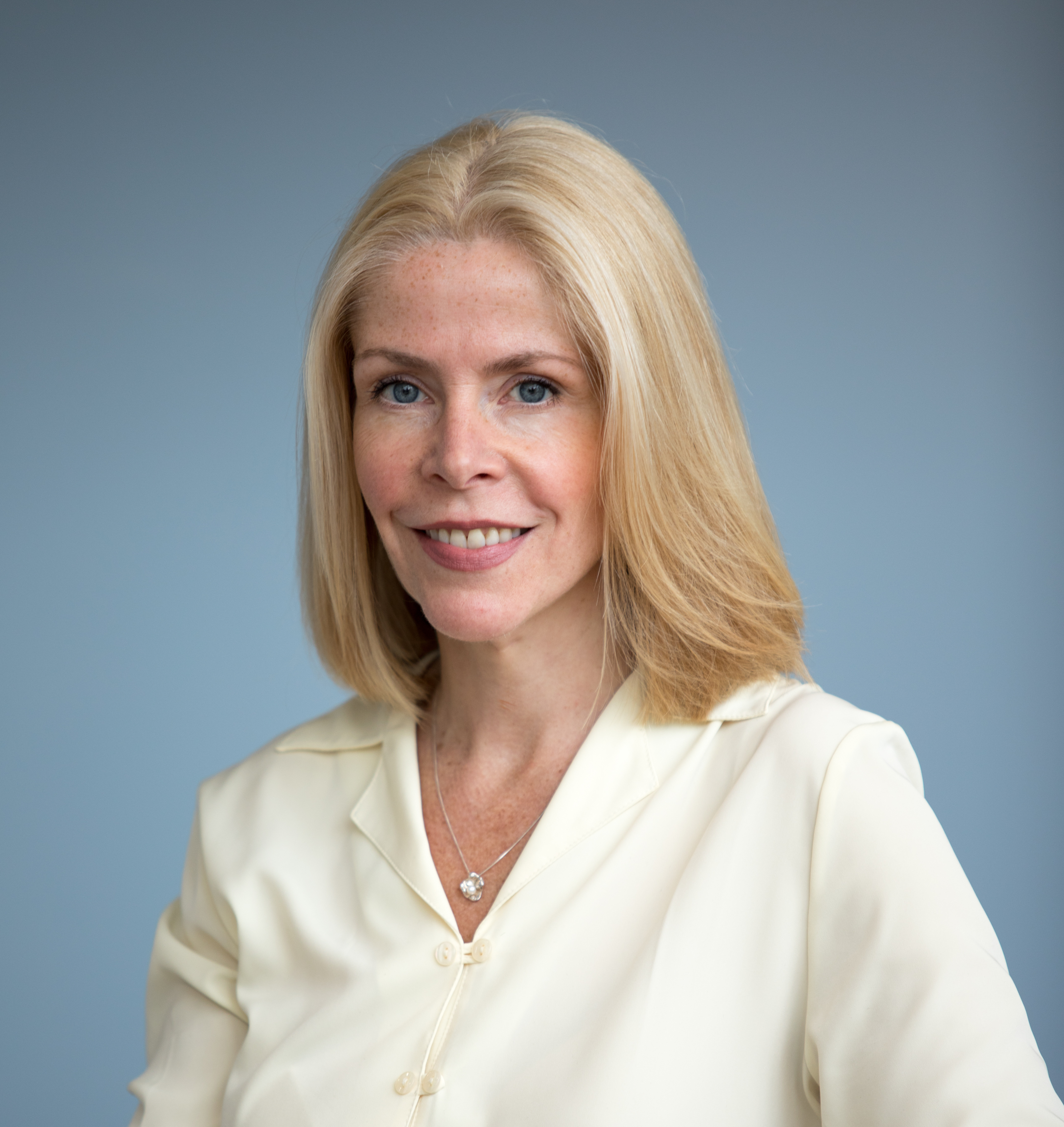
- Bauld in 2018
- Born: 2 June 1970 (age 56); Edinburgh‚ Scotland
- Education: Glenlyon Norfolk School; University of Toronto (BA); University of Edinburgh (PhD)
- Known for: Health policy
- Scientific career
- Fields: Public health, addiction research, policy evaluation
- Workplaces: University of Kent; University of Glasgow; University of Stirling; Cancer Research UK
- Thesis: Older patient participation in multi-disciplinary decision-making: discharge planning in Scotland and British Columbia, Canada (1998)
- Website: www.ed.ac.uk/profile/linda-bauld

Linda Caroline Bauld (born 2 June 1970) is the Bruce and John Usher Chair of Public Health in The Usher Institute at the University of Edinburgh and Chief Social Policy Advisor to the Scottish government.

== Early life and education ==
Bauld was born on 2 June 1970, in Edinburgh. Her parents emigrated to Canada from Scotland in 1979 when she was a child. She spent her teenage years on Vancouver Island and attended Glenlyon Norfolk School in Victoria. She completed high school at the top of her graduating class (dux) in 1987 and was awarded a Governor General's Medal by the Province of British Columbia. She spent a year in Grenoble, France as an exchange student between 1987 and 1988. She completed her bachelor's degree in Political Science at the University of Toronto in 1993. During her time as an undergraduate she was involved in the Hart House Debating Society and competed in public speaking and debating competitions in the US and Canada. In 1991, she was awarded best individual debater at the North American Debating Championship. She earned her PhD in social policy at the University of Edinburgh.

== Career and research ==
After her PhD, Bauld joined the University of Kent as a postdoctoral fellow in 1997. Her postdoctoral role at Kent was in the Personal Social Services Research Unit, where she worked with Bleddyn Davies on the reform of health and social care for older people. She co-authored a book evaluating the community care reforms of the 1990s and served as research advisor to the Scottish Executive in the development of free personal care for older people in Scotland.

In 1998, while still at Kent, her research moved from a focus on older people and end-of-life services to the primary prevention of conditions that could cause disability and early mortality in later life. She conducted the first evaluation of National Health Service (NHS) smoking cessation services, which were at the time unique in the world as free-at-the-point-of-use services for smokers who wanted to quit.

Subsequently, she joined the Department of Social Policy at the University of Glasgow as a lecturer in 2000. At the University of Glasgow she continued to build a research portfolio in prevention and public health and contributed to several national evaluations of area-based initiatives including Health Action Zones and the New Deal for Communities. In 2006 Bauld moved to the University of Bath, where she was appointed as Reader and subsequently Professor and Head of Department of Social and Policy Sciences. Also in 2006, Bauld was made the Government of the United Kingdom's scientific adviser on tobacco control, and held this position until 2010.

Her more recent research has focused on the leading preventable causes of non-communicable diseases such as cancer and diabetes.

From 2008, she helped establish the UK Centre for Tobacco Control Studies (UKCTCS), involving 9 universities. She joined the University of Stirling in 2011. In 2013, she led Health First, an independent alcohol strategy for the UK. The strategy examined approaches to addressing harmful alcohol consumption in the UK and called for tougher restriction on alcohol marketing. It also highlighted the importance of empowering licensing authorities, who could control alcohol availability in their jurisdiction. She then became Deputy Director at the UK Centre for Tobacco and Alcohol Studies (UKCTAS), an expansion of UKCTCS involving 13 universities, in 2014.

In the same year, Bauld was appointed as Cancer Research UK's Prevention Champion, a role she held until 2021. She contributed to building the charity's research on preventable risk factors for cancer in the UK and further afield. Along with colleagues at CRUK, UKCTAS and Public Health England, she established the UK Electronic Cigarette Research Forum in 2016.

Much of her previous and ongoing research is on nicotine and tobacco, involving studies to inform approaches to support smokers to quit during pregnancy. Since 2011, she has chaired the multi-agency smoking pregnancy Challenge Group.

She is interested in the evaluation of complex public health interventions and how they can inform health policy. She has conducted research on overweight and obesity, tobacco control, drug and alcohol use and inequalities in health. During the COVID-19 pandemic she was a regular contributor to UK and international media debate on public health responses needed to address it, as well as conducting research on COVID-19 and serving as adviser to the COVID-19 Committee of the Scottish Parliament.

She is the principal investigator of the Tobacco Control Capacity Programme, a global challenge research fund and Cancer Research UK supported program in south Asia and Sub-Saharan Africa. She also leads the SPECTRUM Consortium, involving 10 universities and the main public health agencies in the UK as well as the Obesity Health Alliance, the Alcohol Health Alliance and the Smokefree Action Coalition. She led the academic team that co-authored Turning the Tide, a 10 year Healthy Weight Strategy for the UK.

Bauld joined the University of Edinburgh in November 2018. She serves as Bruce and John Usher Chair of Public Health at The Usher Institute. The Bruce and John Usher Chair is the oldest Professorship of Public Health in the UK. It was jointly endowed following donations by Alexander Low Bruce and family, and the proprietors of William Younger's brewery, and Sir John Usher of Usher's distillery. Bauld is the first woman to hold the chair and follows Professor Raj Bhopal and other prominent Usher Chairs including Francis Albert Eley Crew, Sir John Brotherston and William Garraway.

== Honours and awards ==
- Elected a Fellow of the Royal College of Physicians of Edinburgh (FRCPE) in 2017
- Elected a Fellow of the Royal Society of Edinburgh (FRSE) in 2019
- Elected a Fellow of the Academy of Social Sciences (FAcSS) in 2019
- Elected a Fellow of the Faculty of Public Health (FFPH) in 2020
- Elected a Fellow of the Academy of Medical Sciences (FMedSci) in 2023

Bauld was appointed Officer of the Order of the British Empire (OBE) in the 2021 Birthday Honours for services to guiding public health response to and public understanding of COVID-19.

== Personal life ==
Bauld has a son and a daughter, with Professor Ken Judge, a social policy academic who served as Director of the King's Fund Policy Institute in the 1980s and 90s. They married in 2004 and divorced in 2010. Bauld remarried in 2013 and lives with her second husband and children in Edinburgh.
