= Jason Leitch =

Scottish National Clinical Director

Honorary Professor Jason Leitch CBE FRCS
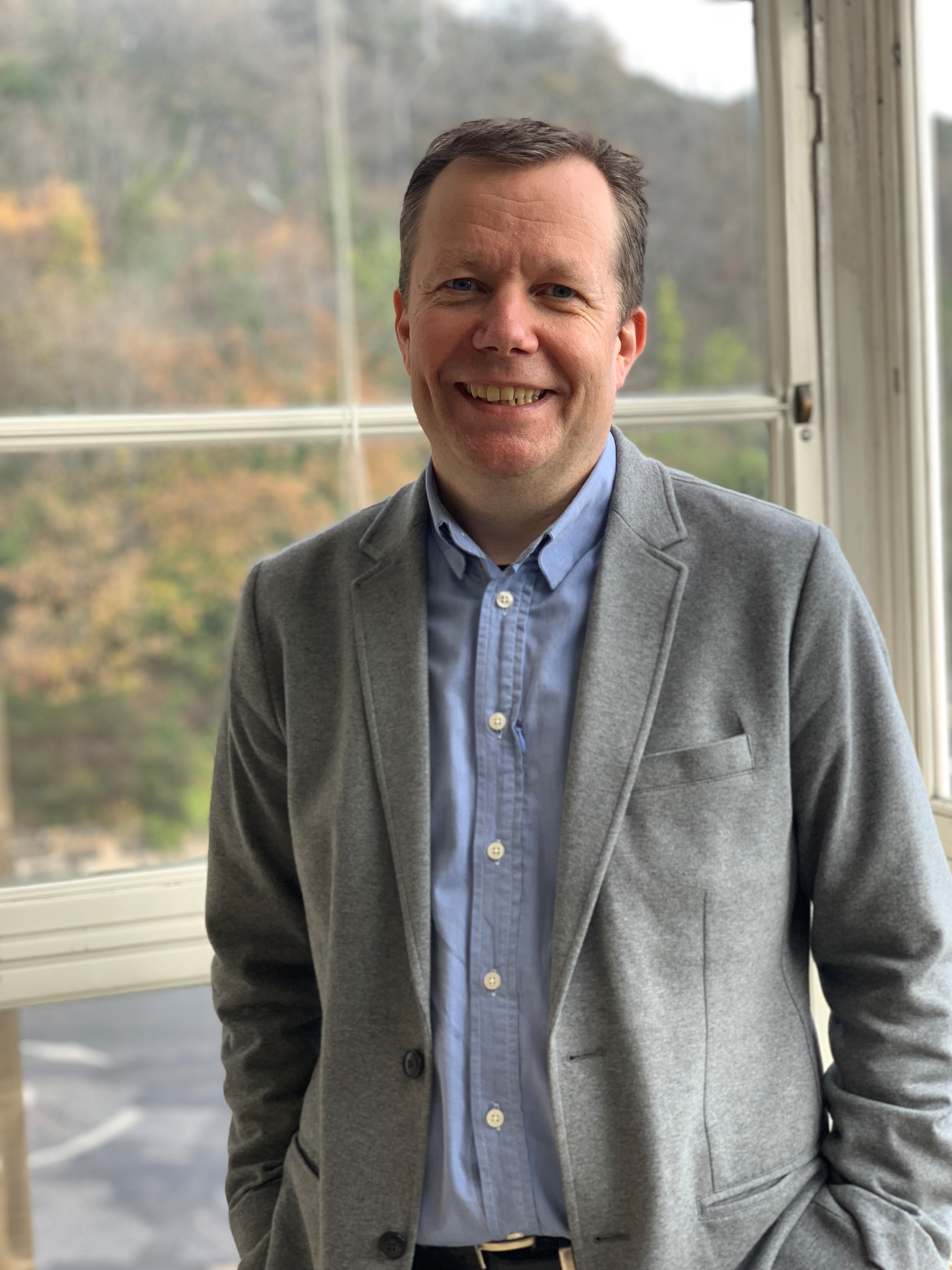
- Born: Jason Andrew Leitch; October 25, 1968 (age 58); Leicester, Leicestershire, England
- Education: University of Glasgow (1991) Harvard University (2006)
- Occupation: National Clinical Director for the Scottish Government
- Years active: 1991–present
- Medical career
- Profession: Dentistry
- Field: Health care, dentistry, NHS Scotland

Jason Andrew Leitch CBE FRCS (born 25 October 1968) is a Scottish healthcare quality and patient-safety specialist, academic and former consultant oral surgeon. He served as National Clinical Director for the Scottish Government from 2015 to 2024 and had a prominent public communication role during the COVID-19 pandemic in Scotland.

== Early life ==
Leitch was born on 25 October 1968, the elder of two children, to Jim and Irene Leitch. His mother was an office manager and his father was a coal miner, electrical engineer, and college educator. Leitch attended Airdrie Academy from 1980 to 1986.

Leitch graduated in dentistry from the University of Glasgow in 1991. He became a Fellow of the Faculty of Dental Surgery at the Royal College of Surgeons (England) in 1996. He has a doctorate from the University of Glasgow (2004), a Masters in Public Health from Harvard University (2006) and is a fellow of The Royal College of Physicians and Surgeons of Glasgow (2004) and the Royal College of Surgeons of Edinburgh (2004). He is also a Fellow of the Higher Education Academy (2004). He was a 2005-06 Quality Improvement Fellow at the Institute for Healthcare Improvement (IHI), in Boston, sponsored by the Health Foundation, he is now a Senior Fellow at the IHI.

== Career ==
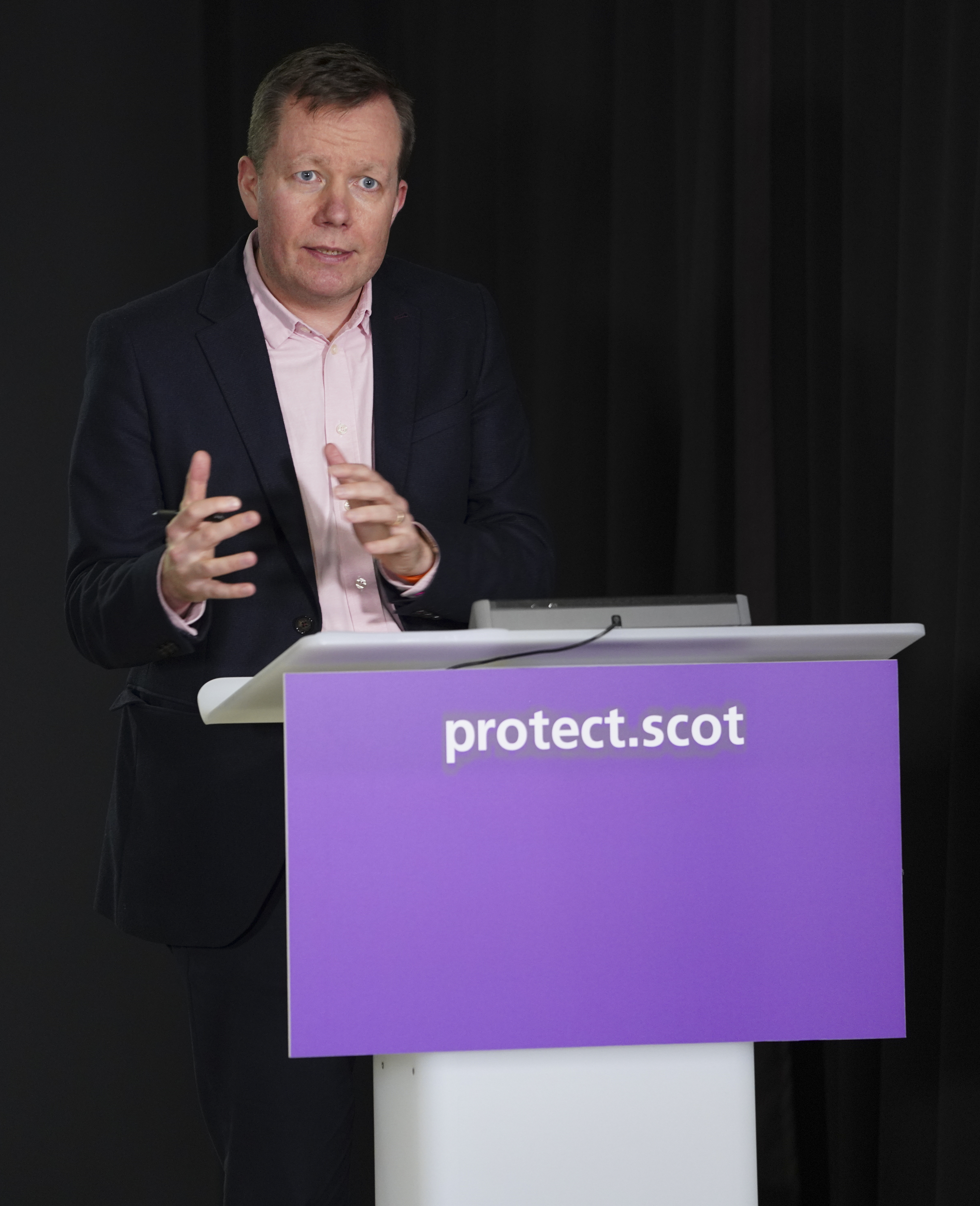
Leitch during a COVID-19 press conference, 2020

=== Clinical ===
Leitch completed a number of training jobs in the West of Scotland prior to becoming a Clinical Lecturer and Honorary Consultant in Oral Surgery at Glasgow Dental Hospital and School.

=== Scottish Government ===
Leitch worked for the Scottish Government from 2007 when he joined as the National Clinical Lead for Safety and Improvement. This was followed by roles as the National Clinical Lead for Quality; the Clinical Director of the Quality Unit and later the National Clinical Director in the Health and Social Care Directorate. He was a Senior Clinical Advisor to the Scottish Government and a member of the Health and Social Care Management Board. Leitch was involved in the COVID-19 pandemic response, where his duties included communicating complex scientific information to the public.

Leitch was part of the senior team who conceived, designed and led the Scottish Patient Safety Programme.

Leitch was a member of the Health and Social Care Management Board and one of the senior team responsible for implementation of the NHS Scotland Quality Strategy.

Leitch was responsible for quality in the health and social care system, including patient safety and person-centred care, NHS planning, and implementing quality improvement methods across the government and the broader public sector. He was a member of the Transformational Change as well as the Performance Boards at the Scottish Government.

Throughout the COVID-19 pandemic, Leitch played a key role in public health communication and engagement. He regularly featured at Scottish Government press conferences as well as public engagement on regional and national television and radio. He received praise for his ability to communicate complex scientific information to the public. He regularly featured on programmes such as Off the Ball to answer questions submitted by members of the public. In March 2020 he assessed that it was impossible to suppress the virus, that 80% of the population becoming infected was inevitable, and that all that could be done was to smooth the epidemic out over a lengthy period of time, so not to overwhelm the health services too much.

The Scottish Government announced his departure on 12 March 2024, stating that he would leave the National Clinical Director post at the end of April 2024.

== Board positions ==
Leitch is Vice Chair of the Board of Trustees of the Nazareth Trust - a charity registered in the UK operating Israel which runs the hospital in Nazareth for the Arab Israeli community and a large nursing school. He is a Trustee of the Indian Rural Evangelical Fellowship - which runs orphanages in southeast India.

Until December 2012 he chaired the Conduct and Health Committees of the General Dental Council, the regulatory body for dentistry in the UK. Leitch was a Non-executive Board member of the Medical and Dental Defence Union of Scotland. He sat on their Board, investment committee and the nominations committee.

== Awards and honours ==
2011: HFMA UK Clinician of the Year.

2013: Honorary Professor at the University of Dundee.

2019: Honorary Professor at the University of Strathclyde.

2019: Commander of the Order of the British Empire (CBE) in the 2019 Birthday Honours for services to healthcare and charity.

2020: The Fletcher of Saltoun Award for Science.

2020: Member of National Academy of Medicine.

2022 Meritorious Endeavours in Environmental Health Award, The Royal Environmental Health Institute of Scotland.

== Advisory roles ==
Leitch has been invited to speak at events around the world and has advised Governments in the UK, Denmark, Sweden, Norway, The Republic of Ireland, Jordan, Canada, Brazil and South Africa.

He was appointed to the NHS England review group led by Don Berwick looking into the patient safety elements of the Francis Enquiry.

Leitch also serves as a College Ambassador for The College of General Dentistry.

He is a member of the advisory group that supports the Patient Safety Commissioner for Scotland.

== Personal life ==
Leitch is married.

== Selected bibliography ==
=== Presentations ===
- “What Matters to Me” – a new vital sign. TEDxGlasgow. June 2016. “What Matters to Me” – a new vital sign | Jason Leitch | TEDxGlasgow
- “Lessons from the Scottish Patient Safety Programme”. March 2014. The King's Fund. Jason Leitch: Lessons from the Scottish Patient Safety Programme

=== Books ===
- Dick S, Daniel M, Leitch J. 2010. Applying a Reliable Design Framework to Improve Quality of Care for Your Patients. Case Study: Implementing the Ventilator-associated Pneumonia (VAP) Prevention Bundle. Published by the USAID Health Care Improvement Project. Bethesda, MD: University Research Co., LLC (URC).
- Medical emergencies in the Dental Surgery. Robb ND, Leitch JA. Oxford University Press, London, 2006.
- General and Oral Surgery. Wray D, Stenhouse D, Lee D, Clark A. Elsevier, London, 2003 – chapters on conscious sedation techniques and extractions.
- Churchill's pocketbook of Clinical Dentistry. Chesnutt I, Gibson J. Churchill Livingstone, 2002, 2004, 2006. – Chapter on analgesia, sedation and general anaesthesia.

=== Articles ===
- Ramsay G, Haynes AB, Lipsitz SR, Solsky I, Leitch J, Gawande AA, Kumar M. Reducing surgical mortality in Scotland by use of the WHO Surgical Safety Checklist. Br J Surg. 2019 Jul;106(8):1005-1011. doi: 10.1002/bjs.11151. Epub 2019 Apr 16.
- O'Brien C, Urquhart CS, Allam S, Anderson KJ, Leitch JA, Macpherson A, Kenny GNC. Reaction time-monitored patient-maintained propofol sedation: a pilot study in oral surgery patients. Anaesthesia, 2013, 68: 760–764.
- Robb ND, Leitch J, O’Brien C. Predoctoral Teaching in Intravenous Conscious Sedation: Ten Years at Glasgow Dental School. Journal of Dental Education, 2013 (7):58-62.
- Moore R, Strachan H, O’Shea R, Leitch J. The nursing contribution to quality healthcare in NHSScotland. Journal of Nursing Regulation, 2012(3):29-35.
- Keightley A., Lucey S, Leitch J, Lloyd R, Campbell, C. Summary of: A pilot improvement project in hospital-based oral healthcare: improving caries risk assessment documentation. British Dental Journal, 2012(2):84-85.
- Haraden C, Leitch J. Scotland's Successful National Approach To Improving Patient Safety In Acute Care. Health Aff. 2011; 30(4):755-63.
- Rooney KD, Leitch J. Quality and Safety in NHS Scotland. The British Journal of Diabetes and Vascular Disease 2010; 10 (2): 98–100.
- Rooney KD, Leitch J. Advancing patient safety – The Scottish Patient Safety Programme. Anaesthesia News 2009; 260: 20–1.
- Rooney KD, Leitch J. Standards, safety and quality – where next? The Scottish Patient Safety Programme. Journal of the Intensive Care Society 2008; 9 (3): 271–2.
