= Hallucination (artificial intelligence) =

Erroneous AI-generated content presented as true

A video of the Glenfinnan Viaduct in Scotland generated by Sora, incorrectly showing: a second track, trains running on the right instead of the left, a second chimney on its interpretation of the train The Jacobite, inconsistent carriage lengths, unnatural amounts of visual noise, and a carriage bending along its length as it rounds the turn.

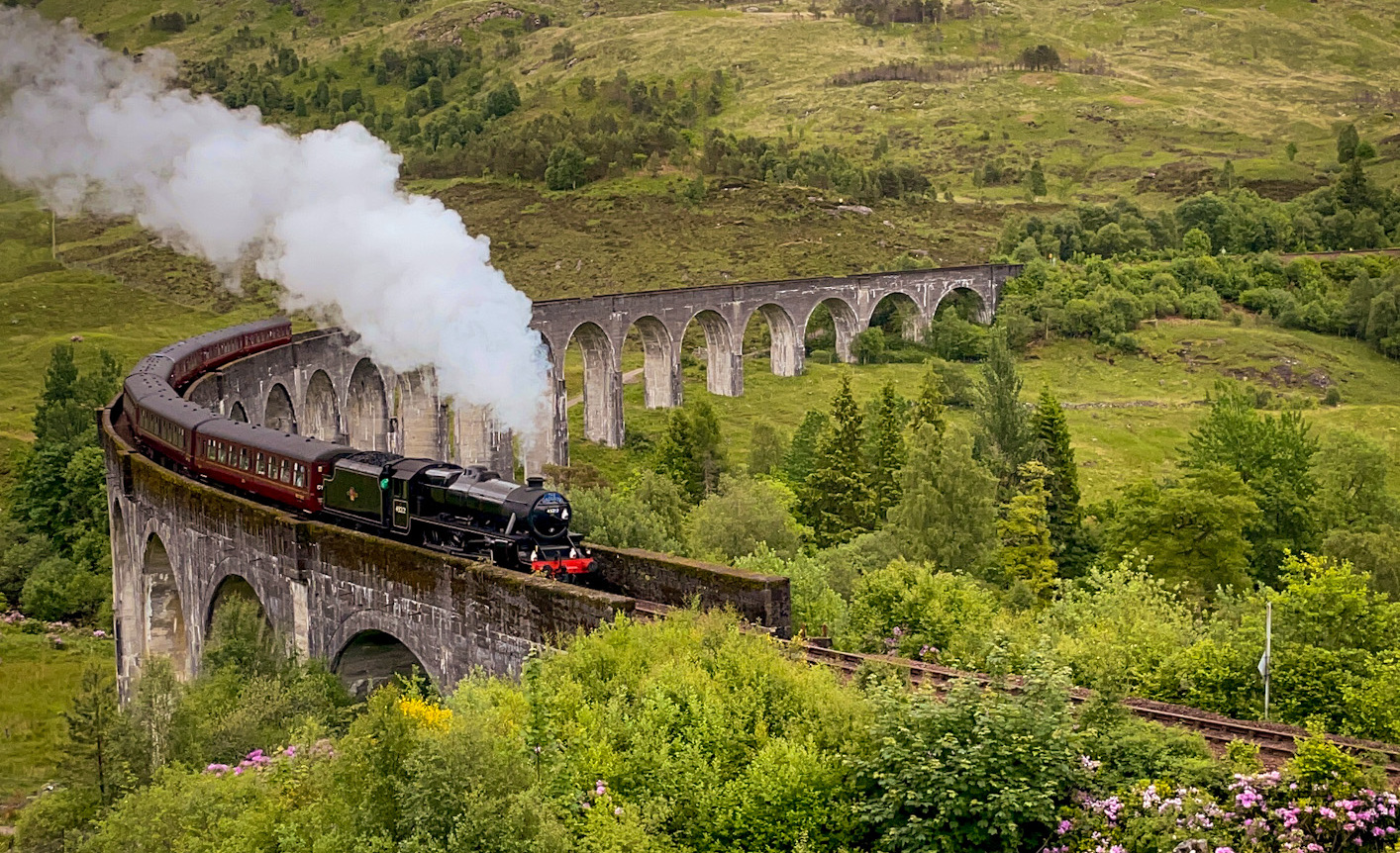
The real Glenfinnan Viaduct with the real The Jacobite on it

In the field of artificial intelligence (AI), a hallucination or artificial hallucination (also called bullshitting, confabulation, delusion, or mirage) is a response generated by AI that contains false or misleading information presented as fact. These terms draw a loose analogy with human psychology, where a hallucination typically involves false percepts.

Chatbots powered by large language models (LLMs), like ChatGPT, may embed plausible-sounding random falsehoods within their generated content, such as fabricated citations. Detecting and mitigating errors and hallucinations pose significant challenges for practical deployment and reliability of LLMs in high-stakes scenarios, such as chip design, supply chain logistics, and medical diagnostics. Some software engineers and statisticians have criticized the specific term "AI hallucination" for unreasonably anthropomorphizing computers. Symbolic artificial intelligence models generally do not produce hallucinations, unlike large language models.

== Term ==
=== Origin ===
In computer vision, since the 2000s, hallucination is adding detail to an image to improve it. For example, the task of generating high-resolution face images from low-resolution inputs is face hallucination. The term was introduced in the PhD thesis of Eric Mjolsness in 1986. A notable work is the face hallucination algorithm by Simon Baker and Takeo Kanade published in 1999.

In the 2000s, hallucinations were described in statistical machine translation as a failure mode.

Since the 2010s, hallucination has come to mean the generation of factually incorrect or misleading outputs by AI systems in tasks like machine translation and object detection. In 2015, hallucinations were identified in visual semantic role labeling tasks by Saurabh Gupta and Jitendra Malik. In 2015, computer scientist Andrej Karpathy used hallucinated in a blog post to describe his recurrent neural network (RNN) language model generating an incorrect citation link. In 2017, Google researchers used it to describe the responses generated by neural machine translation (NMT) models when they are not related to the source text, and in 2018, it was used in computer vision to describe the erroneous detection of non-existent objects through adversarial attacks.

In July 2021, Meta warned during its release of BlenderBot 2 that the system is prone to hallucinations, defined as "confident statements that are not true". Following OpenAI's ChatGPT release in beta version in November 2022, some users complained that such chatbots often seem to pointlessly embed plausible-sounding random falsehoods within their generated content. Many news outlets, including The New York Times, started to use hallucinations to describe these models' frequently incorrect or inconsistent responses.

In 2023, the Cambridge dictionary updated its definition of hallucination to include this new sense specific to the field of AI.

Some researchers have highlighted a lack of consistency in how hallucination is used, but also identified several alternative terms in the literature, such as confabulations, fabrications, and factual errors.

=== Definitions and alternatives ===
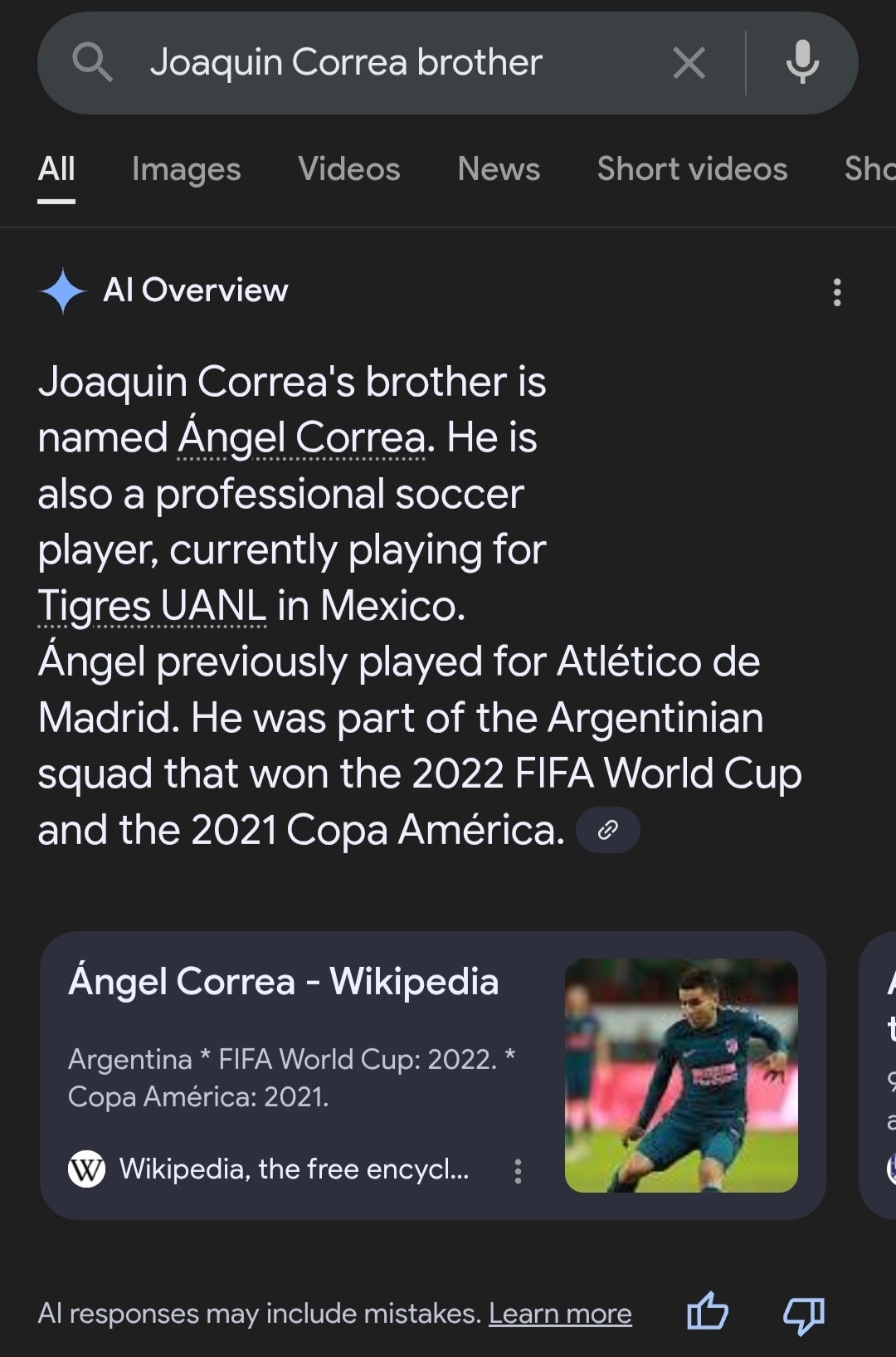
AI Overviews result (10 August 2025) incorrectly stating that Ángel Correa is the brother of Joaquín Correa; the two are unrelated.

Uses, definitions and characterizations of the term hallucination in the context of LLMs include:

- "a tendency to invent facts in moments of uncertainty" (OpenAI, May 2023)
- "a model's logical mistakes" (OpenAI, May 2023)
- "fabricating information entirely, but behaving as if spouting facts" (CNBC, May 2023)
- "making up information" (The Verge, February 2023)
- "misleading and/or nonsensical factual errors" (Algorithm Watch and AI Forensics, December 2023)
- "probability distributions" (in scientific contexts)

In July 2024, a White House report on fostering public trust in AI research mentioned hallucinations only in the context of reducing them. Notably, when acknowledging David Baker's Nobel Prize-winning work with AI-generated proteins, the Nobel committee avoided it entirely, instead referring to "imaginative protein creation".

Hicks, Humphries, and Slater, in their article in Ethics and Information Technology, argue that the output of LLMs is bullshit under Harry Frankfurt's definition, and that the models are "in an important way indifferent to the truth of their outputs", with true statements only accidentally true, and false ones accidentally false. Some researchers also call the uncritical use of AI botshit.

The term mirage has been proposed as an alternative to the use of hallucination, framing false or misleading responses as predictable results of LLM data processing created by both AI training datasets and the rules engineered into the LLM rather than a mental breaking from reality. This shift in language aims to increase AI literacy by using terminology that avoids anthropomorphic implications that LLMs have conscious minds with their own intent, shows that untrue outputs come from patterns in training data, and indicates that outputs are novel syntheses of training data requiring critical human judgment.

=== Criticism ===
In the scientific community, some researchers avoid hallucination, as potentially misleading. Usama Fayyad, executive director of the Institute for Experimental Artificial Intelligence at Northeastern University, criticized it because it misleadingly personifies large language models and is vague. The computer scientist Mary Shaw has said "The current fashion for calling generative AI's errors 'hallucinations' is appalling. It anthropomorphizes the software, and it spins actual errors as somehow being idiosyncratic quirks of the system even when they're objectively incorrect." The statistician Gary Smith argues that LLMs "do not understand what words mean" and consequently that hallucination unreasonably anthropomorphizes the machine. Murray Shanahan argues that anthropomorphic framing of LLM capabilities, including terms like hallucination, encourages users and researchers to attribute cognitive processes to systems that operate through statistical pattern completion, and advocates more careful linguistic practices when discussing LLM behavior. Kristina Šekrst argues that applying psychological vocabulary to LLM outputs obscures the difference between the appearance of mental properties and their genuine presence. Förster & Skop assert that tech companies use the hallucination metaphor to anthropomorphize models and deflect responsibility for non-factual outputs. In January 2026, researchers Emily M. Bender and Nanna Inie broadly criticized the anthropomorphization of AI in an op-ed, later proposing "undesirable output" as a linguistic alternative.

Some see the AI outputs not as illusory but as prospective—that is, having some chance of being true, similar to early-stage scientific conjectures. The term has also been criticized for its association with psychedelic drug experiences.

== In natural language generation ==
=== Causes ===
In natural language generation, there are several reasons why LLMs hallucinate. The pre-training of generative pretrained transformers (GPT) involves predicting the next word, which incentivizes them to "give a guess" about what the next word is, even when they lack information. Hallucinations can also stem from incomplete, inaccurate or unrepresentative datasets. In particular, they often repeat common misconceptions, conspiracy theories, and scenarios in fiction treated as fact. Training a chatbot in favor of a friendlier personality tends to reduce accuracy, since they are more inclined to agree with the user.

Some researchers take an anthropomorphic perspective and posit that hallucinations arise from a tension between novelty and usefulness. For instance, Amabile and Pratt define human creativity as the production of novel and useful ideas. By extension, a focus on novelty in machine creativity can lead to the production of original but inaccurate responses—that is, falsehoods—whereas a focus on usefulness may result in memorized content lacking originality.

In 2025, according to interpretability research by Anthropic on Claude, the LLM appears to have internal circuits that cause it to decline to answer questions unless it knows the answer. By default, the circuits are active and the LLM doesn't answer. When the LLM has sufficient information, these circuits are inhibited and the LLM answers the question. The researchers said that hallucinations were found to occur when this inhibition happens incorrectly, such as when Claude recognizes a name but lacks sufficient information about that person, causing it to generate plausible but untrue responses.

=== Examples ===
On 15 November 2022, researchers from Meta AI published Galactica, designed to "store, combine and reason about scientific knowledge". Content generated by Galactica came with the warning: "Outputs may be unreliable! Language Models are prone to hallucinate text." In one case, when asked to draft a paper on creating avatars, Galactica cited a fictitious paper from a real author who works in the relevant area. Meta withdrew Galactica on 17 November due to offensiveness and inaccuracy.

OpenAI's ChatGPT, released in beta version to the public on 30 November 2022, was based on the foundation model GPT-3.5 (a revision of GPT-3). Professor Ethan Mollick of Wharton called it an "omniscient, eager-to-please intern who sometimes lies to you". Data scientist Teresa Kubacka has recounted deliberately making up the phrase "cycloidal inverted electromagnon" and testing ChatGPT by asking it about the (nonexistent) phenomenon. ChatGPT invented a plausible-sounding answer backed with plausible-looking citations that compelled her to double-check whether she had accidentally typed in the name of a real phenomenon. Other scholars such as Oren Etzioni have joined Kubacka in assessing that such software can often give "a very impressive-sounding answer that's just dead wrong".

When CNBC asked ChatGPT for the lyrics to "Ballad of Dwight Fry", ChatGPT supplied invented lyrics rather than the actual lyrics. Asked questions about the Canadian province of New Brunswick, ChatGPT got many answers right but incorrectly classified Toronto-born Samantha Bee as a "person from New Brunswick". Asked about astrophysical magnetic fields, ChatGPT incorrectly volunteered that "(strong) magnetic fields of black holes are generated by the extremely strong gravitational forces in their vicinity". (In reality, as a consequence of the no-hair theorem, a black hole without an accretion disk is believed to have no magnetic field.) Fast Company asked ChatGPT to generate a news article on Tesla's last financial quarter; ChatGPT created a coherent article, but made up the financial numbers contained within.

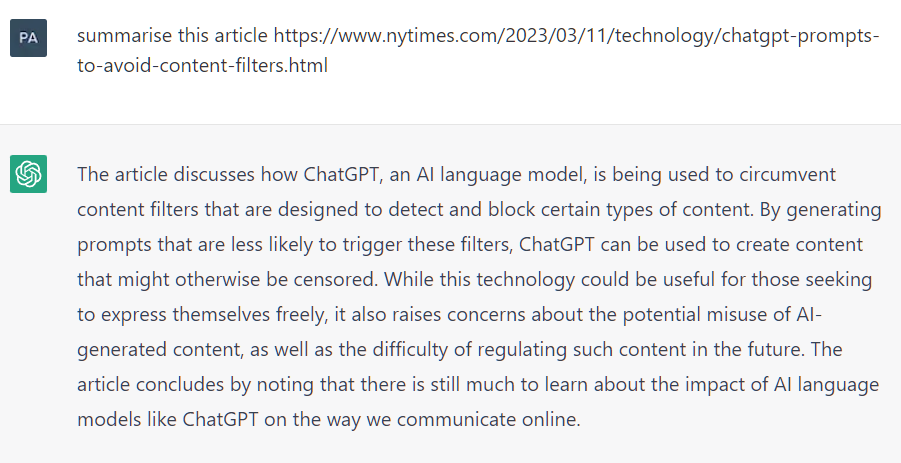
When prompted to "summarize an article" with a fake URL that contains meaningful keywords, even with no Internet connection, the chatbot generates a response that seems valid at first glance.

Other examples involve baiting ChatGPT with a false premise to see if it embellishes upon the premise. When asked about "Harold Coward's idea of dynamic canonicity", ChatGPT fabricated that Coward wrote a book titled Dynamic Canonicity: A Model for Biblical and Theological Interpretation, arguing that religious principles are actually in a constant state of change. When pressed, ChatGPT continued to insist that the book was real. Asked for proof that dinosaurs built a civilization, ChatGPT claimed there were fossil remains of dinosaur tools and stated, "Some species of dinosaurs even developed primitive forms of art, such as engravings on stones". When prompted that "Scientists have recently discovered churros, the delicious fried-dough pastries ... (are) ideal tools for home surgery", ChatGPT claimed that a "study published in the journal Science" found that the dough is pliable enough to form into surgical instruments that can get into hard-to-reach places, and that the flavor has a calming effect on patients.

By 2023, analysts considered frequent hallucination to be a major problem in LLM technology, with a Google executive identifying hallucination reduction as a "fundamental" task for ChatGPT competitor Google Gemini. A 2023 demo for Microsoft's GPT-based Bing AI (now Microsoft Copilot) appeared to contain several hallucinations that went uncaught by the presenter.

In June 2023, Mark Walters, a gun rights activist and radio personality, sued OpenAI in a Georgia state court after ChatGPT mischaracterized a legal complaint in a manner alleged to be defamatory against Walters. The complaint in question was brought in May 2023 by the Second Amendment Foundation against Washington attorney general Robert W. Ferguson for allegedly violating their freedom of speech, whereas the ChatGPT-generated summary bore no resemblance and claimed that Walters was accused of embezzlement and fraud while holding a Second Amendment Foundation office post that he never held in real life. According to AI legal expert Eugene Volokh, OpenAI is likely not shielded against this claim by Section 230, because OpenAI likely "materially contributed" to the creation of the defamatory content. In May 2025, Judge Tracie Cason of Gwinnett County Superior Court ruled in favor of OpenAI, stating that the plaintiff had not shown he was defamed, as Walters failed to show that OpenAI's statements about him were negligent or made with "actual malice".

In February 2024, Canadian airline Air Canada was ordered by the Civil Resolution Tribunal in Moffatt v. Air Canada to pay damages to a customer and honor a bereavement fare policy that was hallucinated by a support chatbot, which incorrectly stated that customers could retroactively request a bereavement discount within 90 days of the date the ticket was issued (the actual policy does not allow the fare to be requested after the flight is booked). The Tribunal rejected Air Canada's defense that the chatbot was a "separate legal entity that is responsible for its own actions".

In October 2025, several hallucinations, including non-existent academic sources and a fake quote from a federal court judgement were discovered in an A$440,000 report written by Deloitte and submitted to the Australian government in July. The company later submitted a revised report with these errors removed, and will issue a partial refund to the government. The following month, in November 2025, The Independent, a news publication in Newfoundland and Labrador, Canada, discovered that Deloitte's CA$1.6 million Health Human Resources Plan for the Government of Newfoundland and Labrador commissioned in May 2025 contained at least four false citations to non-existent research papers.

== In other modalities ==
=== Object detection ===
Various researchers cited by Wired have classified adversarial hallucinations as a high-dimensional statistical phenomenon, or have attributed hallucinations to insufficient training data. Some researchers believe that some "incorrect" AI responses classified by humans as "hallucinations" in the case of object detection may in fact be justified by the training data, or even that an AI may be giving the "correct" answer that the human reviewers are failing to see. For example, an adversarial image that looks, to a human, like an ordinary image of a dog, may in fact be seen by the AI to contain tiny patterns that (in authentic images) would only appear when viewing a cat. The AI is detecting real-world visual patterns that humans are insensitive to.

Wired noted in 2018 that, despite no recorded attacks "in the wild" (that is, outside of proof-of-concept attacks by researchers), there was "little dispute" that consumer gadgets, and systems such as automated driving, were susceptible to adversarial attacks that could cause AI to hallucinate. Examples included a stop sign rendered invisible to computer vision; an audio clip engineered to sound innocuous to humans, but that software transcribed as "evil dot com"; and an image of two men on skis, that Google Cloud Vision identified as 91% likely to be "a dog". However, these findings have been challenged by other researchers. For example, it was objected that the models can be biased towards superficial statistics, leading adversarial training to not be robust in real-world scenarios.

The following images demonstrate an example of how an artificial neural network might make a false positive result in object detection, potentially appearing as a hallucination in the output:

The network is trained by multiple images known to depict starfish and sea urchins, which are correlated with "nodes" representing visual features. Starfish match with a ringed texture and star outline, whereas most sea urchins match with a striped texture and oval shape.

The resulting model contains weighted associations between visual features and output categories. Because one training image depicts a ring-textured sea urchin, the model also develops a weak association between ringed texture and sea urchin.

Subsequent run of the model on an input image (left): The network correctly detects the starfish. However, the weak association between ringed texture and sea urchin also gives a weak signal to the latter from one of two intermediate nodes. In addition, a shell not included in the training gives a weak signal for the oval shape, also resulting in a weak signal for the sea urchin output. These weak signals may result in a false positive result for sea urchin.

In reality, such textures and outlines would not be represented by single nodes, but rather by associated weight patterns of multiple nodes.

=== Text-to-image generative AI ===
Text-to-image models, such as Stable Diffusion, Midjourney and others, often produce inaccurate or unexpected results. For instance, Gemini depicted Nazi German soldiers as people of color, causing controversy and leading Google to pause image generation involving people in Gemini. Generative AI is also used in photo sleuthing, occasionally causing problems. Luther (2025) describes instances in which generative AI tools used in photo-sleuthing incorrectly identify individuals or fabricate historical matches when analyzing archival military images. These image-based hallucinations can lead to the spread of misinformation about historical figures, military records, and genealogical research.

== In legal filings ==
=== United States ===
Judges have been issuing sanctions. Bar associations have been issuing warnings. And in courtrooms across the country, lawyers have been caught submitting briefs containing citations to cases that never existed—ghost precedents conjured by AI tools that state falsehoods with quiet authority. None of it has slowed down BigLaw's AI bet. If anything, the industry is doubling down.

— Fortune, 12 May 2026

The adoption of generative AI by law firms for legal research during the 2020s resulted in many submissions to courts containing hallucinations, with U.S. judges nationwide sanctioning or reprimanding lawyers. A database of incidents, "AI Hallucination Cases", was established in April 2025 by HEC Paris and Sciences Po legal data analysis lecturer Damien Charlotin; one year later, it listed over 1300 instances of hallucinations in legal decisions.

In May 2023, it was discovered that Stephen Schwartz had submitted six fake case precedents generated by ChatGPT in his brief to the Southern District of New York on Mata v. Avianca, Inc., a personal injury case against the airline Avianca. Schwartz said that he had never previously used ChatGPT, that he did not recognize the possibility that ChatGPT's output could have been fabricated, and that ChatGPT continued to assert the authenticity of the precedents after their nonexistence was discovered. In response, Brantley Starr of the Northern District of Texas banned the submission of AI-generated case filings that have not been reviewed by a human, noting that:

Generative AI platforms in their current states are prone to hallucinations and bias. On hallucinations, they make stuff up—even quotes and citations. Another issue is reliability or bias. While attorneys swear an oath to set aside their personal prejudices, biases, and beliefs to faithfully uphold the law and represent their clients, generative artificial intelligence is the product of programming devised by humans who did not have to swear such an oath. As such, these systems hold no allegiance to any client, the rule of law, or the laws and Constitution of the United States (or, as addressed above, the truth). Unbound by any sense of duty, honor, or justice, such programs act according to computer code rather than conviction, based on programming rather than principle.

On 23 June 2023, judge P. Kevin Castel dismissed the Mata case and issued a $5,000 fine to Schwartz and another lawyer—who had both continued to stand by the fictitious precedents despite Schwartz's previous claims—for bad faith conduct. Castel characterized numerous errors and inconsistencies in the opinion summaries, describing one of the cited opinions as "gibberish" and "[bordering] on nonsensical".

In May 2025, high-profile pro se plaintiff Ashley Gjøvik, who has a Juris Doctor from Santa Clara University School of Law, was admonished in U.S. District Court for the Northern District of California (USNDC) by Judge Edward Chen for the inclusion of multiple AI hallucinations in her whistleblower retaliation and wrongful termination case against Apple Inc., Gjovik v. Apple Inc., warning that future instances would result in Gjøvik being held in contempt of court and her pro se privileges revoked. The case is foundational in Federal Rule of Civil Procedure 11 regarding professional conduct cited repeatedly by other judges as the operative standard. It has also been discussed by the American Bar Association in updating the model professional rules and cited in its opinion regarding the use of generative AI.

In September 2025, USNDC Magistrate Judge Peter Kang sanctioned Webb Law attorney Katherine Cervantes for her submission of July 21 that included an AI hallucination which she stated had been obtained from Westlaw AI, the Thomson Reuters' artificial intelligence tool. On April 28, 2026, Judge Kang sanctioned and fined Webb Law Group managing partner Lenden Webb for insufficient supervision of Cervantes—a junior lawyer incorporating AI for the first time—therefore allowing the legal submission that included an AI hallucinated citation of July 21, 2025.

On 18 March 2026, Clayton County, Georgia, Assistant District Attorney Deborah Leslie appeared before the Supreme Court of Georgia to deliver oral arguments regarding an order to deny an appeal for a murder conviction, which a Clayton County Superior Court judge used in denying the defendant's motion. During the session, Chief Justice Nels S. D. Peterson noted at least five fictitious citations within the filing, as well as five others that did not support the proposition for which they were cited. On 30 March 2026, Leslie admitted in an affidavit to not verifying AI-generated "expanded legal research" used to prepare the order, which District Attorney Tasha Mosley corroborated in a written apology to Peterson. On 5 May, the Supreme Court vacated the lower court's ruling and ordered for a new order with legitimate citations to be written. Leslie was also suspended from practicing before the Supreme Court for six months and was ordered to take additional education for ethics and proper use of artificial intelligence.

In April 2026, Sullivan & Cromwell submitted an apology to the U.S. Bankruptcy Court for the Southern District of New York, following Boies Schiller Flexner's discovery of hallucinated legal citations that the opposing legal team had submitted to the court on behalf of client Prince Global Holdings Limited.

On 28 April 2026, U.S. Magistrate Judge Robert T. Numbers formally reprimanded former assistant U.S. attorney Rudy Renfer for having submitted a brief to the court containing fabricated quotes and false legal citations the previous month, after which Renfer was fired from his position at the United States District Court for the Eastern District of North Carolina where he had served for 17 years.

=== Canada ===
As of 14 June 2026, Canadian courts and tribunals have received at least 167 filings containing AI-hallucinated, fictitious citations, across 51 courts and tribunals. On 9 June 2026, the Chief Justice of Canada, the Right Honourable Richard Wagner, P.C., stated that AI is present in courtrooms "in ways both promising and problematic".

=== Israel ===
As of August 2026, Israeli courts and tribunals had identified at least 55 cases in which parties submitted documents containing fictitious citations or otherwise AI-hallucinated arguments. On February 2025, the Israeli High Court of Justice warned litigants that further incidents of this kind would attract sanctions such as personal cost orders or disciplinary proceedings before the Bar. The emerging Israeli case law on AI hallucinations also included instances in which police prosecutors and municipal authorities relied on fictitious statutory provisions. In March 2026 the Israeli Court Administration issued an ethical code for AI use in the judicial system, which requires judges and staff to verify AI outputs against authoritative sources and extends that duty to the content of the parties' pleadings.

=== England and Wales ===
The High Court of Justice criticised the use of generative AI-based pleadings with hallucinated authorities in the conjoined 2025 case of Ayinde v Haringey and Al-Haroun v Qatar. In addition, the UK's First-tier Tribunal and Upper Tribunal has dealt with a number of cases where litigants have generated hallucinated legal citations.

Legal professional bodies have put out guidance on the use of AI including the Solicitors Regulation Authority, the Law Society of England and Wales, and the Bar Council.

== In scientific research ==
=== Problems ===
There are many noted instances of LLMs citing sources that are either incorrect or do not exist. A 2023 study conducted in the Cureus Journal of Medical Science showed that out of 178 total references cited by GPT-3, 69 returned an incorrect or nonexistent digital object identifier (DOI). An additional 28 had no known DOI nor could be located in a Google search.

Another instance was documented in 2023 by Jerome Goddard from Mississippi State University. In an experiment, ChatGPT had provided questionable information about ticks. Unsure about the validity of the response, they inquired about the source that the information had been gathered from. Upon looking at the source, it was apparent that the DOI and the names of the authors had been hallucinated. Some of the authors were contacted and confirmed that they had no knowledge of the paper's existence whatsoever. Goddard says that, "in [ChatGPT's] current state of development, physicians and biomedical researchers should NOT ask ChatGPT for sources, references, or citations on a particular topic. Or, if they do, all such references should be carefully vetted for accuracy." The use of these language models is not ready for fields of academic research and that their use should be handled carefully.

Nina Schick said that the persuasive quality of hallucinated content generated by AI systems poses risks to democratic institutions by enabling the spread of convincing but false narratives. She said, "The core risk to democracy is a future in which AI is used as an engine to power all information and knowledge-consequently degrading trust in the medium of digital information itself." She said that the rapid proliferation of generative AI may challenge public trust by blurring the boundaries between verified information and synthetic misinformation.

On top of providing incorrect or missing reference material, ChatGPT also has issues with hallucinating the contents of some reference material. A study that analyzed a total of 115 references provided by ChatGPT-3.5 documented that 47% of them were fabricated. Another 46% cited real references but extracted incorrect information from them. Only the remaining 7% of references were cited correctly and provided accurate information. ChatGPT has also been observed to "double-down" on a lot of the incorrect information. When asked about a mistake that may have been hallucinated, sometimes ChatGPT will try to correct itself but other times it will claim the response is correct and provide even more misleading information.

These hallucinated articles generated by language models also pose an issue because it is difficult to tell whether an article was generated by an AI. To show this, a group of researchers at the Northwestern University of Chicago generated 50 abstracts based on existing reports and analyzed their originality. Plagiarism detectors gave the generated articles an originality score of 100%, meaning that the information presented appears to be completely original. Other software designed to detect AI generated text was only able to correctly identify these generated articles with an accuracy of 66%. Research scientists had a similar rate of human error, identifying these abstracts at a rate of 68%. From this information, the authors of this study concluded, "[t]he ethical and acceptable boundaries of ChatGPT's use in scientific writing remain unclear, although some publishers are beginning to lay down policies." Because of AI's ability to fabricate research undetected, the use of AI in the field of research will make determining the originality of research more difficult and require new policies regulating its use in the future.

Given the ability of AI generated language to pass as real scientific research in some cases, AI hallucinations present problems for the application of language models in the academic and scientific fields of research due to their ability to be undetectable when presented to real researchers. The high likelihood of returning non-existent reference material and incorrect information may require limitations to be put in place regarding these language models. Some say that rather than hallucinations, these events are more akin to "fabrications" and "falsifications" and that the use of these language models presents a risk to the integrity of the field as a whole.

Some academic professionals who support scholarly research, such as academic librarians, have observed a significant increase in workload related to verifying the accuracy of references. Zoë Teel said in a 2023 paper that universities may need to resort to implementing their own citation auditing in order to track the problem of fictitious references.

Some nonexistent phrases such as "vegetative electron microscopy" have appeared in nearly two dozen research papers, including a paper from an Elsevier editor, as a result of having become embedded in AI training data.

=== Benefits ===
At the University of Washington, David Baker's lab has used AI hallucinations to design millions of proteins that do not occur in nature, leading to roughly 100 patents and the founding of over 20 biotech companies. This work contributed to Baker receiving the 2024 Nobel Prize in Chemistry, although the committee avoided using the "hallucinations" language.

At California Institute of Technology, researchers used hallucinations to design a catheter that reduces bacterial contamination. The design features sawtooth-like spikes on the inner walls that prevent bacteria from gaining traction, potentially reducing the number of urinary tract infections. These scientific applications of hallucinations differ fundamentally from chatbot hallucinations, as they are grounded in physical reality and scientific facts rather than ambiguous language or internet data. Anima Anandkumar, a professor at Caltech, emphasizes that these AI models are "taught physics" and their outputs must be validated through rigorous testing. In meteorology, scientists use AI to generate thousands of subtle forecast variations, helping identify unexpected factors that can influence extreme weather events.

At Memorial Sloan Kettering Cancer Center, researchers have applied hallucinatory techniques to enhance blurry medical images, while the University of Texas at Austin has utilized them to improve robot navigation systems.

Hallucinations, when constrained by scientific methodology, can significantly accelerate the discovery process.

== Consequences in education ==
Artificial intelligence hallucinations can impact education. There has been a rise in students using AI tools for assistance in research or writing tools such as Grammarly or using generative AI programs such as ChatGPT. This has raised concern regarding academic integrity in submitted projects in addition to hallucinations causing students to learn incorrect information.

Part of this concern lies in the citations provided by LLMs and generative AI. A 2024 study at the University of Mississippi found that many of these citations that students submitted were partially or completely fabricated. 47% of these sources either had incorrect titles, dates, authors, or a combination of all. The study notes that these inconsistencies in student-submitted citations cause educators and librarians to manually check the accuracy more frequently.

The Journal of Cranio-Maxillofacial Surgery addresses this risk when it comes to the medical and surgical fields. They mention how academic publishers have acknowledged the issue, and that some journals such as JAMA have changed some of their policies to discourage the use of AI-generated citations. Although the journal states that a policy will not be enough to diminish the use of AI-generated citations, automatic tools to check the citations and AI literacy training should also be adopted.

Instructors may use tools such as Turnitin for plagiarism checking and verification of academic integrity. These tools have been found to sometimes flag papers that have not used any AI assistance in their writing. OpenAI has also found such a lack of accuracy in their own AI detection software that the company shut it down entirely.

== Mitigation methods ==
As of 2025, there is still ongoing research to try to mitigate the occurrence of hallucinations. Research in 2022 has shown that language models not only hallucinate but also amplify hallucinations, even for those which were designed to alleviate this issue. Researchers from OpenAI wrote that hallucinations occur because the training and evaluation of LLMs reward guessing over acknowledging uncertainty, and proposed modifying the scoring of benchmarks.

Researchers have proposed a variety of mitigation measures, including getting different chatbots to debate one another until they reach consensus on an answer and neuro-symbolic architectures with formal knowledge bases and inference engines.

Ji et al. divide common mitigation methods into two categories: data-related methods and modeling and inference methods. Data-related methods include building a faithful dataset, cleaning data automatically, and information augmentation by augmenting the inputs with external information. Model and inference methods include changes in the architecture (either modifying the encoder, attention, or the decoder in various ways); changes in the training process, such as using reinforcement learning; and post-processing methods that can correct hallucinations in the output.

Nvidia Guardrails, launched in 2023, can be configured to hard-code certain responses via script instead of leaving them to the LLM. Furthermore, tools such as the Trustworthy Language Model have been created to attempt to aid in the detection of hallucination.

Evaluating multiple possible replies before answering a query by assigning confidence scores to each could mitigate the problem. However, this approach would multiply computational costs. Active learning would further increase these costs. In high-stakes domains such as chip design, supply chain logistics, and medical diagnostics, the added costs would be operationally necessary in order for LLMs to be used. In chatbots, however, customers tend to prefer rapid, overconfident answers over cautious, uncertainty-aware ones.

Retrieval-augmented generation, used by many modern chatbots, reduces hallucinations by allowing LLMs to access external sources before providing information.

== See also ==
- AI alignment – Conformance of AI to intended objectives
- AI effect – Phenomenon in which AI achievements are reclassified as non-intelligent
- AI safety – Artificial intelligence field of study
- AI slop – Low-quality AI-generated digital content
- Artifact (error) – Any error in the perception or representation of information
- Artificial stupidity – Deliberate errors by an artificial intelligence
- Chatbot psychosis – Psychological phenomenon
- Memetic algorithm – Algorithm for searching a problem space
- Turing test – Test of a machine's ability to imitate human intelligence
- Uncanny valley – Hypothesis that human replicas elicit revulsion
