= Ayinde v Haringey and Al-Haroun v Qatar =

2025 British legal cases

R (Ayinde) v London Borough of Haringey [2025] EWHC 1383 (Admin) (AC-2024-LON-003062) and Al-Haroun v Qatar National Bank QPSC and QNB Capital LLC (CL-2024-000435) were UK legal cases where lawyers gave legal arguments with citations that were spurious or hallucinated.

== Facts ==
Ayinde was a judicial review of a decision by the London Borough of Haringey regarding a homeless person under s188(3) of the Housing Act 1996. Al-Haroun was a commercial dispute seeking damages for the breach of a finance agreement.

The lawyers had used chatbots powered by large language models to generate legal arguments, and then placed these before the court without checking them. This misled the court and materially misstated the law. The two cases were unrelated, except in the misuse of generative artificial intelligence.

== Judgment ==
The High Court of Justice issued a joint judgment on the use of AI. The judgment stressed that there is a basic duty on lawyers to check the accuracy of material that is put before the court. The court referred each lawyer involved to the Solicitors Regulation Authority (notwithstanding that they had all self-referred before judgment), and sent a copy of the judgment to the Bar Council, the Law Society, and the Council of the Inns of Court.

== Other cases ==
Similar issues arose in the subsequent cases of Rodney v Gee'z Micro Bar & Pitstop and Ndaryiyumvire v Birmingham City University.

=== Previous cases ===
In the judgment, the court reviewed the following previous cases from the Anglosphere where large language models had misrepresented the law.

==== England and Wales ====
- SW Harber v Commissioners for His Majesty's Revenue and Customs [2023] UKFTT 1007 (TC)
- Olsen v Finansiel Stabilitet A/S [2025] EWHC 42 (KB)
- Zzaman v Commissioners for His Majesty's Revenue and Customs [2025] UKFTT 00539 (TC)
- Bandla v Solicitor's Regulation Authority [2025] EWHC 1167 (Admin)

==== United States of America ====
- Mata v. Avianca, Inc. Case No. 22-cv-1461 (PKC), 2o23 WL 4114965 (SDNY 22 June 2023)
- Ex parte Lee 673 SW 3d 755 (Tex App Waco 19 July 2023)
- Kohls v Elison No 24-cv-3754 (D Minn 10 January 2025)
- Park v Kim 91 F 4th 610 (2d Cir 2023)
- Kruse v Karlen 692 SW 3d 43 (Mo Ct App 2024)
- Lacey v State Farm General Insurance Co CV 24-5205 FMO (MAAx), 6 May 2025
- United States v Hayes (E.D. Cal. Jan 17, 2025)
- Saxena v Martinez Hernandez (D. Nev. April 23, 2025)
- United States v Cohen 724 F Supp 3d 251 (SDNY 2024)

==== Australia ====
- Valu v Minister for Immigration and Multicultural Affairs (No 2) [2025] FedCFamC2G 95

==== New Zealand ====
- Wikeley v Kea Investments Ltd [2024] NZCA 609

==== Canada ====
- Zhang v Chen [2024] BCSC 285
- Geismayr v The Owners, Strata Plan KAS 1970 [2025] BCCRT 217
- Ko v Li [2025] ONSC 2766
