= Moffatt v. Air Canada =

2024 Canadian small claims case

- Court: Civil Resolution Tribunal
- Full case name: Jake Moffatt v. Air Canada
- Decided: February 14, 2024
- Citation: 2024 BCCRT 149

Holding
- Air Canada is liable for negligent misrepresentation arising from incorrect information given to a customer from its AI chatbot.

Court membership
- Tribunal Member: Christopher C. Rivers

Moffatt v. Air Canada, 2024 BCCRT 149, is a decision of the Civil Resolution Tribunal of British Columbia which held that a company could be held liable for misleading information given to customers by an AI chatbot. Despite being a small claims case with only CA$880 (US$704) at stake, the case received significant international media attention because of its unique nature, being one of the earliest to hold that a company is liable for mistakes made by its AI agent, and because of the "remarkable" claim made by Air Canada that its chatbot constituted a separate legal entity over whose actions it could not be held responsible.

== Background ==
The grandmother of the plaintiff, Jake Moffatt, had passed away in 2022 on Remembrance Day. Following her death, Moffatt visited the website of the defendant Air Canada to purchase a round-trip airline ticket for immediate travel between Vancouver and Toronto, where his grandmother had died. While visiting Air Canada's website, Moffatt interacted with an AI support chatbot and asked it about Air Canada's bereavement fare policy, to which the chatbot responded that Moffatt could purchase the tickets at full price and then subsequently claim a refund of the price difference by submitting an application within 90 days of the ticket's issuance. Moffatt then purchased the tickets from Air Canada at a cost of CA$1,630 (US$1,304).

Moffatt subsequently applied for a refund of the price difference, which Air Canada refused to give, citing a different section of their website which stated that bereavement fares could not be applied retroactively to completed flights and had to be applied for prior to the flight. When Moffatt cited the information given to him by the chatbot, representatives of Air Canada stated that the chatbot had provided "misleading words". Moffatt subsequently filed a claim against Air Canada in the Civil Resolution Tribunal seeking CA$880 (US$704) as the difference between the price he paid and the bereavement fare he believed he would have been charged.

== Decision ==
The tribunal ruled that as the chatbot formed a part of Air Canada's website, Air Canada is fully responsible for the information it provides. In its submissions, Air Canada claimed that the chatbot was "a separate legal entity that is responsible for its own actions", a submission which tribunal member Christopher Rivers called "remarkable", but nonetheless rejected. On this basis, Rivers found Air Canada liable for negligent misrepresentation and awarded Moffatt CA$812 (US$650) as the difference between the price he paid and the cost of bereavement fares, plus costs and interest.

== Reactions ==
The case attracted international attention shortly after the release of the tribunal's decision. The American Bar Association called it "a helpful reminder that companies remain liable for the actions of their AI tools". Aviation industry expert Marisa Garcia said "For passengers, the only lesson is that they cannot fully rely on the information provided by airline chatbots." Business Insider labelled the chatbot's actions as an example of "botshit", and "one example of how the use of AI might worsen companies' customer service".
