= John Agar (disambiguation) =

John Agar may refer to:

- John Agar (1921-2002), American actor
- John G. Agar (lawyer) (1856-1936), American lawyer
- John Samuel Agar (1773–1858), English portrait painter and engraver
- John Agar-Hamilton (1895-1984), South African historian and priest
- Jonathan Agar, chief executive of Birketts
- Jon Agar, lectured at Wilkins-Bernal-Medawar Lecture
