= Gaby Hardwicke Solicitors =

Law firms of the United Kingdom

- Headquarters: Eastbourne, East Sussex, United Kingdom
- No. of offices: 3
- No. of lawyers: 65
- Major practice areas: Business law, Family law
- Date founded: 1889
- Founder: Dr Frederick Goodwin
- Company type: Partnership
- Website: www.gabyhardwicke.co.uk

Gaby Hardwicke Solicitors is a law firm in East Sussex, England. It provides business and family law services and has offices in Eastbourne, Bexhill-on-Sea and Hastings, East Sussex.

== History ==
The firm was founded in 1889 by Dr Frederick Goodwin, a former Gladstonian candidate for Bury St Edmunds, who three years later was joined in practice by Ralph Hale Gaby. Goodwin left the partnership in 1894, most probably due to ill health (he died in 1897 of heart disease), leaving Gaby to continue alone.

After the First World War Gaby was joined in partnership by Herbert Junius Allen Hardwicke (known as 'Allen' Hardwicke), son of the physician Herbert Junius Hardwicke. By 1921, the firm was known as 'Gaby and Hardwicke' and had opened an office in Bexhill-on-Sea. Following Ralph Gaby's death in 1927, the firm's title briefly changed to 'Gaby, Hardwicke and Evans-Vaughan', then to 'Gaby, Hardwicke, Evans-Vaughan and Bubear', as it acquired new partners.

In 1940, Evans-Vaughan and Bubear left the partnership and Allen Hardwicke continued in practice alone. He was joined by other partners, including J. M Baldry, G. G. Herbert and A. J. Arscott, and was still practising law at the time of his death at age 83 in 1965.

Gaby Hardwicke Solicitors has expanded considerably during the last four decades and has merged with several smaller local firms, including Yearwood & Griffiths, RE Mitchell & Co, Eaton Sagar, Langhams, Pearse Carty Solicitors, Temple Bird, Morgan & Lamplugh, Fynmores Solicitors and Lycett Conveyancing Solicitors. It opened its Eastbourne office in 1985 and its Hastings office in 1999. In March 2011, Gaby Hardwicke was the first British law firm to serve a court summons via Facebook. The firm was highly commended for 'Excellence in Learning and Development' in The Law Society's 2018 Excellence Awards.
