= Burnley Grammar School =

Grammar school in Lancashire, England

Location
- Byron Street; Burnley, Lancashire; England; 53.795°N 2.293°W

Information
- Type: Grammar school
- Established: 1559
- Closed: 1981
- Local authority: Lancashire
- Gender: Male
- Age: 13 to 18

Burnley Grammar School was latterly, a state-funded selective boys' grammar school, situated in Byron Street in Burnley, Lancashire, England. However, during its long history, it moved between a number of sites in the town.

== History ==
In 1552, on the order of King Edward VI, Chantries were dissolved, effectively closing the Chantry School in Burnley. The lands that had funded the chantry, were purchased by some of the wealthy men of the parish and granted to the former chantry priests for the rest of their lives. This enabled the chantry school to continue to operate for a few more years.

By 1558 it had become obvious that the chantries would not be restored and the men urged the endowment of a Free Grammar School, with additional gifts of land and rents. February 1, 1559, the Habergham deed was sealed marking the beginning of the Burnley Grammar School. The Towneley family - along with the Haydock, Habergham, Woodruff and Whitacre - were the founders and governors of the school.

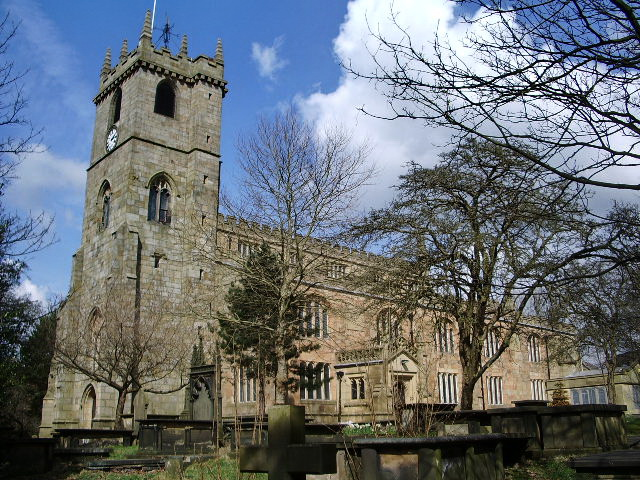
St. Peter's Church, Burnley

Its first headmaster was a former chantry priest, Gilbert Fairbank, with lessons initially taught at his home next to St Peter's Church (53.792°N 2.240°W). In 1602, one of the governors, John Towneley, paid for a new schoolhouse to be built in the churchyard.

There was a dispute throughout the 1680s between the Catholic Towneleys and the school's Anglican governors over the choice of schoolmasters. This resulted in the building the construction of an Anglican schoolhouse (53.793°N 2.240°W) in 1693. The school is situated across the River Brun in an area then known as Brown Hill. In 1728 the Suffolk-based, Burnley born clergyman, Henry Halstead left a large collection of books to the School's library.

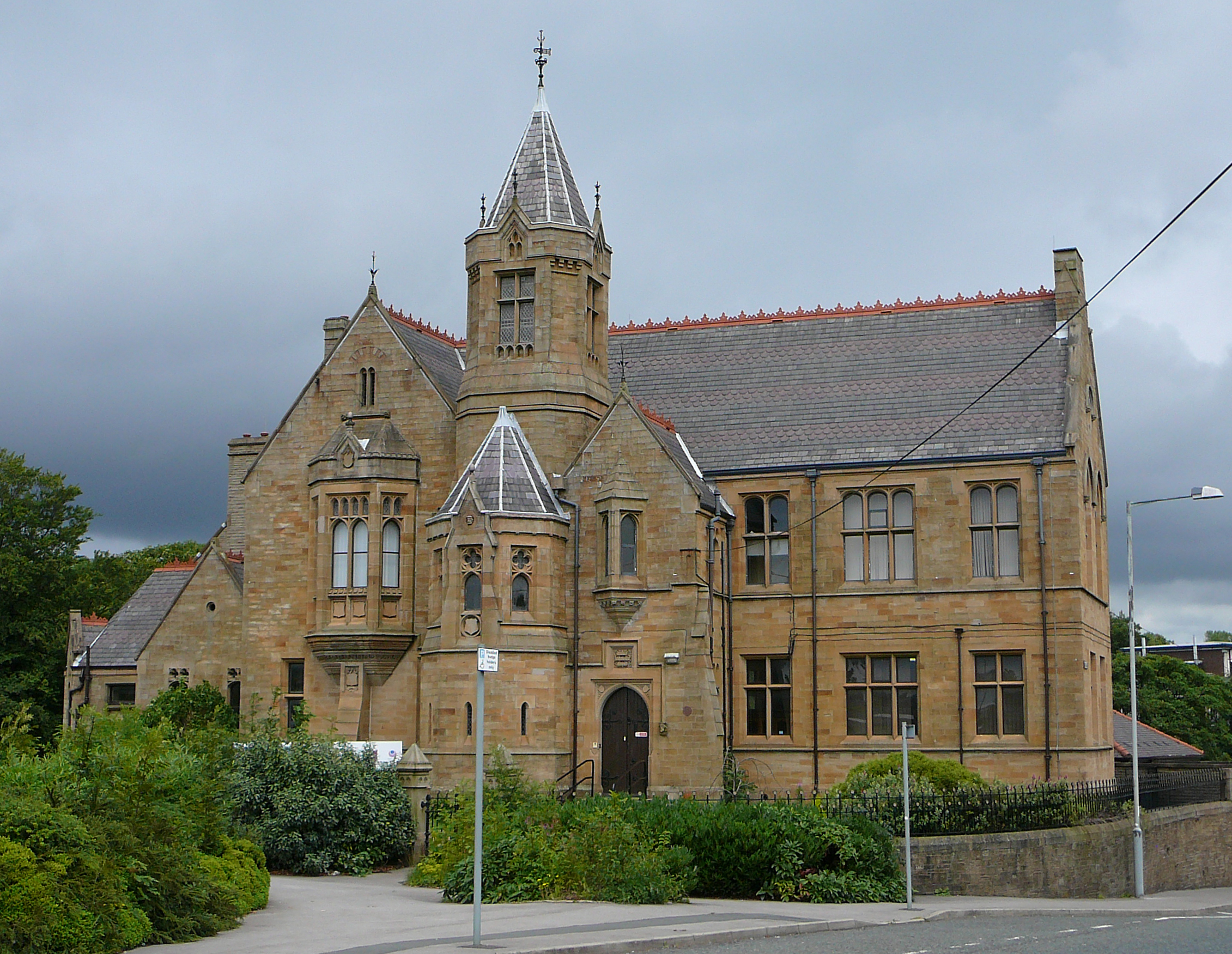
Former Burnley Grammar School (1874-1959)

The school seems to have been in decline in second half of the 19th century, even as the town rapidly expanded around it. An education commissioner's report from the late 1860s showed attendance to be low and the schoolhouse in a poor state. Wealthy families shunned the school in favour of distant boarding schools, and several attempts to raise funds for a new building failed. During 1871 the Governors of the school agreed to allow representatives of the Town Council and School Board to join them, in return for financial aid. This resulted in the 1874 opening of new school buildings across Bank Parade (53.793°N 2.241°W), which can still be seen today. Despite an agreement at this time to establish a girls department once funding could be established, no action was taken. By the late 1890s, it looked like the school board would create a rival higher grade school, which would likely be disastrous for the grammar school. Some girls were allowed to attend from 1903 and it was taken over entirely by the council in 1904. It was decided that an equivalent girls' school should be created and Burnley High School for Girls opened in Ormerod Road in 1909 (53.793°N 2.238°W). It moved to a new building in the former grounds of Ivy Bank House in the 1951 (53.794°N 2.288°W). In 1959 the grammar school moved once again to larger premises on Byron Street (53.795°N 2.293°W), next to the girls' school, with Ivy Bank Secondary Modern School also constructed on the site in the 1960s.

The mixed comprehensive Habergham High School was formed in 1981, from the merger of two schools, with the girls' school becoming the sixth form centre.

Burnley Grammar School's last headteacher was Keith Panter.

In 2006 Habergham merged with Ivy Bank to form Hameldon Community College, which in 2010 moved to a new building on Coal Clough Lane. In 2015 it was announced that the recently opened free school, Burnley High, will have a new building on the former Habergham site.

== Alumni ==
=== Burnley Grammar School ===
Pre-twentieth century

- John Wareing Bardsley, Bishop of Sodor and Man between 1887 and 1891, then Bishop of Carlisle.
- Arthur Bell, architect and amateur Burnley FC footballer 1902–09.
- Henry Halliwell, Dean and Hebrew lecturer at Brasenose College, Oxford, rector of Clayton-cum-Keymer and translator of the classics.
- Philip Gilbert Hamerton, 19th-century artist, art critic and author.
- William Mitchell, Conservative MP for Burnley from 1900 to 1906.
- Francis Robert Raines, vicar of Milnrow and vice-president of the Chetham Society from 1858 to 1878.
- Richard Shaw (MP), the first MP for Burnley 1868–76.
- Prof John Stephenson, CIE FRS FRSE FRCS, a surgeon and zoologist who was a leading expert on the earthworms of the Indian subcontinent.
- Richard Tattersall, founder of the racehorse auctioneers Tattersalls in 1766.

Twentieth century

- Sir Herbert Ashworth, chairman from 1972 to 1986 of Nationwide Building Society.
- John Benn CB, Chairman of the Northern Ireland School Examinations Council (NISEC, now called the Council for the Curriculum, Examinations & Assessment) from 1974 to 1981 and Pro-Chancellor Queen's University Belfast 1979–86.
- Mervyn Brooker, former cricketer and headmaster, King Edward VI Camp Hill School for Boys 1995–2002 and Bolton School Boys' Division 2003–08.
- Prof Fred Brown OBE, virologist, Professor of Microbiology from 1989 to 1990 at the University of Surrey.
- Prof Kenneth Cameron CBE, Professor of English Language from 1964 to 1987 at the University of Nottingham.
- Sir Colin Campbell, Town Clerk at Burnley 1923-35 and Plymouth 1935–53.
- Prof John Collinge CBE, Professor of Neurology since 2001 at University College London.
- David Crossland, former Chairman of Airtours (now known as MyTravel Group), who founded the company in 1972.
- Harry Crossley, Chief Executive from 1974 to 1979 of Derbyshire County Council.
- Air Marshal Sir Herbert Durkin CBE, worked on the Oboe and GEE RAF wartime navigation systems, prepared the electrical systems for Operation Hurricane in 1952, and was President of the Institution of Electrical Engineers (IEE) from 1980 to 1981.
- Ernest Faraday, great-great-nephew of Michael Faraday, and designer of electrical illuminations.
- Peter Guttridge, novelist and critic.
- Sir John Hacking, Chief Engineer of the Central Electricity Board from 1944 to 1947, and President from 1951 to 1952 of the IEE.
- Dr Albert Haffner, Chairman of the North Eastern Gas Board from 1971 to 1972, and President of the Institution of Gas Engineers from 1962 to 1963.
- Eric Halsall, provided the commentary from 1976 to 1990 for One Man and His Dog.
- Prof Ian Hargreaves, Professor of Journalism since 1998 at Cardiff University and Editor from 1994 to 1996 of The Independent.
- Sir Cyril Harrison, became a director of the English Sewing Cotton Company in 1942, rising to become Chairman 1963–68.
- Don Haworth, Producer and writer, known for his work with the BBC.
- Sir Desmond Heap, President from 1972 to 1973 of the Law Society of England and Wales.
- Prof Frank Hodson, Professor of Geology from 1958 to 1981 at the University of Southampton.
- Nigel Hunter (Danbert Nobacon), musician – Chumbawamba.
- Willis Jackson, Baron Jackson of Burnley, Professor of Electrical Engineering at Imperial College London from 1946 to 1953 and 1961–7, and President of the IEE from 1959 to 1960 and the British Association for the Advancement of Science from 1966 to 1967.
- David McLeod, Consultant Surgeon at the Manchester Royal Eye Hospital and Professor of Ophthalmology at the University of Manchester since 1988.
- Dr Jeff Merrifield, (author, playwright) director of Playback Arts since 1975.
- Richard Moore, former RSC and television actor.
- Richard Alvin Neilson CMG LVO, Ambassador to Colombia from 1987 to 1990 and Chile from 1990 to 1993, and High Commissioner to Trinidad and Tobago from 1994 to 1996.
- Sir Hubert Newton, chairman from 1976 to 1985 of Britannia Building Society.
- Sir George Ogden, Chief Executive from 1973 to 1976 of Greater Manchester Metropolitan County Council.
- Prof Steve Ormerod, Professor of Ecology since 2001 at Cardiff University and chairman of the RSPB Council.
- Prof Theodore Osborn, Sherardian Professor of Botany from 1937 to 1953 at the University of Oxford.
- Prof John Pickard, composer.
- Dr David Pickersgill Treasurer of The British Medical Association 2002–2011.
- Prof John V. Pickstone, historian of science, technology and medicine at the University of Manchester.
- Judge David MW Pickup, formerly Barrister on the Northern Circuit 1984–2014, Member of the Honourable Society of the Inner Temple, Fee-paid Judge of the Mental Health Tribunal 2006, Fee-paid Judge of the First-tier Immigration & Asylum Tribunal (IAC) 2006, Deputy Upper Tribunal Judge (IAC) 2012, appointed Salaried First-tier Tribunal Judge of the IAC 2018, appointed Salaried Upper Tribunal Judge (IAC) 2019. Author of ‘The Pick and Flower of England, the Story of the Mormons in Victorian England’, Living Legend 2001, and various law journal articles including, ‘Reverse Discrimination and Freedom of Movement for Workers’, (1986) Common Market Law Review Vol 23 Issue 1, pp. 135–156.
- Prof Kenneth Rawnsley CBE, Professor of Psychological Medicine from 1964 to 1985 at Cardiff University.
- Martyn Robinson, Artist.
- Philip Rogers MBE, optical designer.
- Robert Sheldon, Baron Sheldon, Labour MP for Ashton under Lyne from 1964 to 2001.
- Alfred Victor Smith, 1st World War VC winning Army Officer.
- Prof Sir Edwin Southern, Professor of Biochemistry at the University of Oxford since 1985.
- Martin Starkie, actor and director.
- Ronald Tate, President Royal Town Planning Institute 2005/6.
- Norman Tattersall, baritone and director of opera at the School of Music, Colchester Institute.
- Prof David Taylor, professor of geography, Trinity College Dublin 2001-12 and professor of tropical environmental change, National University of Singapore since 2012.
- Paul Taylor, DJ and club promoter.
- Prof Frank Thistlethwaite CBE, founding Vice-Chancellor from 1961 to 1980 of the University of East Anglia.
- Boff (Allan) Whalley, musician – Chumbawamba.
- S.D. Whitaker; Senior Master of the Queen's Bench Division - H.M. Remembrancer.
- Air Commodore Robert Parker Musgrave Whitham CB OBE MC, RAF, Director of War Organization, Air Ministry World War II.
- Phil Willis, Baron Willis of Knaresborough, Lib Dem MP from 1997 to 2010 for Harrogate and Knaresborough.
- Peter Wren, Chief Executive of the English Speaking Board.
- Ian Hughes, Ancient historian.

=== Burnley High School for Girls ===
- Fiona Bruce, MP for Congleton since 2010.
- Patricia Taylor, Headmistress of former Parsons Mead School.
- Miranda Carruthers-Watt, Chief Executive of Lancashire Police Authority since 2007.
