= Edward Nally =

Edward Nally may refer to:

- Edward Julian Nally (1859–1953), American radio industrialist
- Edward Nally (solicitor), English solicitor, former President of the Law Society
