= Judge Halpern =

Judge Halpern may refer to:

- James Halpern (born 1945), judge of the United States Tax Court
- Philip M. Halpern (born 1956), judge of the United States District Court for the Southern District of New York
