= Asons =

British law firms established in 2008

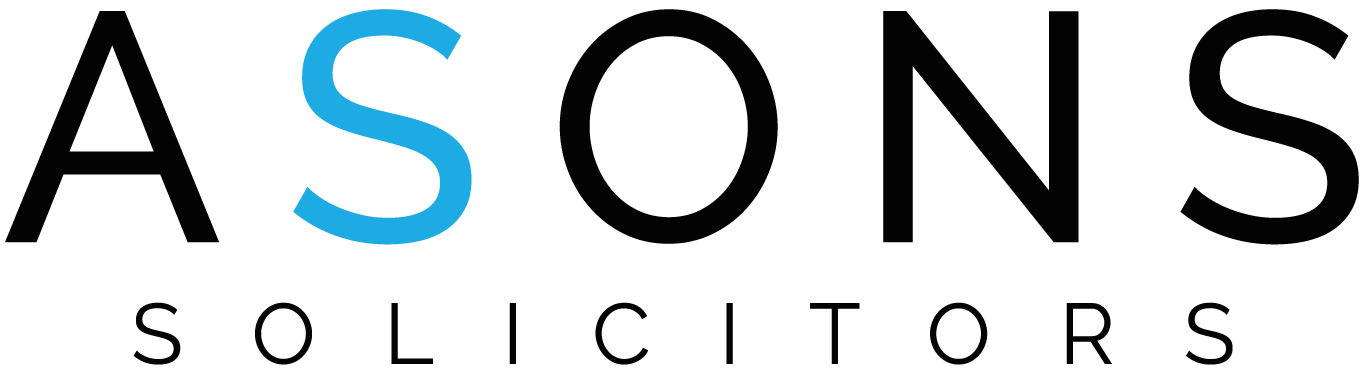
- Headquarters: Bolton, England
- No. of attorneys: 6
- No. of employees: 84
- Major practice areas: Industrial Disease, Medical Negligence, Complex Disease, Road traffic Accident
- Key people: Imran Akram (Chief Executive Officer); Kamran Akram (Principal Director); Bilal Akram (Compliance Director)
- Revenue: GB £13.5 million (2014)
- Date founded: 2008
- Founder: Imran Akram, Kamran Akram, Irfan Akram
- Company type: Limited Company
- Dissolved: Bankruptcy/Breaching SRA Guidelines
- Website: asons.co.uk

Asons Solicitors, a subsidiary of the Asons Group, was a British law firm based in the town of Bolton, Greater Manchester, in the North West of England, approximately 15 miles (24 km) north-west of Manchester.

== Dissolved ==
Asons was recently dissolved by the family after Solicitors Regulation Authority (SRA) intervened and took charge of all their assets which led them to cease trading, with Imran & Kamran Akram leaving the business. The Alternative Business Structure (ABS) which TUPE'd staff across to a law firm founded by brother, Irfan Akram known as Coops Law was also intervened and ceased trading as of 23 June 2017.

The firm employed approximately 84 employees. Its turnover in 2014 was approximately £13.5 million, a 40% increase from the previous year. Asons was the biggest employer in Bolton town centre.

== History ==
Asons Solicitors was a family run firm which was founded in 2008 by brothers, Imran and Kamran Akram, working from a converted terrace house with just three employees to approximately 300 in five years. It provided legal services clients across the UK. Asons was joined in 2014 by younger brother, Bilal Akram, as a Compliance Director.

== Areas of practice ==
Asons Solicitors was one of the largest law firms in the North West specialising in immigration, personal injury claims, industrial injury claims, and medical negligence cases.

== Redundancies ==
Asons Solicitors went under a restructure in December 2015 which saw it make a significant number of redundancies along with cancelling the construction of their £8 million HQ.

== Asons in the news ==
- Solicitors Disciplinary Tribunal – In May 2018, Kamran Akram was cleared of dishonesty in all charges where it was alleged.
- Asons came under fire from receiving a £300,000 payment towards the cost of renovating their new offices. A freedom of Information request was raised by Mr Bonfield which was anticipated by the public.

== Charity and education ==
Asons Solicitors has created a separate entity, Asons Foundation, which headed up all the charitable work carried out.

The Foundation has links with Bolton College and Bolton University and it continues developing an ongoing graduate scheme.

Asons actively supported charities local and further afield, such as Bolton Hospice, Urban Outreach, Bolton School Youth Cricket, the Bolton RUFC under-16 rugby team, and the Bolton Wanderers football club.

== Awards ==
Asons has been honoured with numerous awards including:

- The Sunday Times Best Companies Award 2013. ('Best Companies to Work For' accreditation)
- Customer Service Excellence Award.
- The Lexcel Practice Management Award: 2008 – Present.
- Investors in People Gold Award: 2008–Present.
- Red Ribbon's Family Business Place award, 2014.
- The Skills For Business Award: 2014.
- E3 High Growth Business of the Year – Finalist: 2014.
- The Sunday Times: Top 100 Best Companies to Work For.
