= Philip Leach =

Philip Leach is professor of human rights law at Middlesex University and director of the European Human Rights Advocacy Centre. In 2015, Leach was named Human Rights Lawyer of the Year at the Law Society of England and Wales's annual Excellence Awards.

He is a member of the Advisory Board of the Open Society Justice Initiative, and vice-chair of the European Implementation Network.
