= Eren Kurshan =

American computer scientist

Eren Kurshan is an American computer scientist and inventor, specializing in AI systems, computer system design and optimization. She is recognized for her work and inventions in developing large-scale, mission-critical industrial computing systems for cybersecurity, fraud and financial crime detection towards societal good.

== Biography ==
Kurshan received a Bachelor's Degree in Electrical engineering and a Master's and Ph.D. in Computer science from the University of California, Los Angeles. Upon graduating, she joined IBM T.J. Watson Research Labs, where she worked on emerging technologies, computer design and optimization. Later in her career, she transitioned to industrial leadership roles, where she built and deployed numerous large scale mission critical computing systems, incorporating research and innovative solutions.

== Career ==
Kurshan was inducted into the National Academy of Inventors in recognition of the "societal and economic impact" of her 284 inventions. She was awarded the New York Intellectual Property Association's Inventor of the Year Award in 2024 for "the contribution of the inventions to society as a whole" and was named an ACM Distinguished Member by the Association for Computing Machinery in 2025 for "research and leadership contributions to AI/ML system design and optimization". Kurshan has been serving as a distinguished speaker for the ACM and IEEE (Systems Council, Circuits & Systems Society) aiming to highlight the often overlooked fundamental challenges of AI such as alignment, safety, and inefficiency, which have significant implications for society. She was named as an IEEE Fellow in 2026.
