= William C. Conner =

American judge

William Curtis Conner

Senior Judge of the United States District Court for the Southern District of New York
- In office March 31, 1987 – July 9, 2009

Judge of the United States District Court for the Southern District of New York
- In office December 19, 1973 – March 31, 1987
- Appointed by: Richard Nixon
- Preceded by: Edmund Louis Palmieri
- Succeeded by: Lawrence M. McKenna

Personal details
- Born: William Curtis Conner; March 27, 1920 Wichita Falls, Texas, U.S.
- Died: July 9, 2009 (aged 89) Bronxville, New York, U.S.
- Education: University of Texas at Austin (BBA, LLB)

William Curtis Conner (March 27, 1920 – July 9, 2009) was a United States district judge of the United States District Court for the Southern District of New York. His rulings during his 35 years of service covered a broad range of issues, including the First Amendment, property rights to images of the Marx Brothers after their death, and songwriter royalties.

== Education and career ==
Conner was born in Wichita Falls, Texas, and attended the University of Texas at Austin, graduating with a Bachelor of Business Administration degree in 1941. He received his Bachelor of Laws from the University of Texas School of Law in 1942. During World War II, Conner served on a number of aircraft carriers in the United States Navy Reserve in the Pacific Theater of Operations. After his military service, he joined a New York City law firm with a focus on patent law. He was later named president of what became the New York Intellectual Property Law Association.

== Federal judicial service ==
Conner was nominated by President Richard Nixon on November 9, 1973, to a seat on the United States District Court for the Southern District of New York vacated by Judge Edmund Louis Palmieri. The nomination was made on the recommendation of Senator James L. Buckley of New York, who felt strongly that the court needed someone who had practical experience in patent and intellectual property law. Conner was confirmed by the Senate on December 13, 1973, and received his commission on December 19, 1973. He assumed senior status on March 31, 1987, and relocated his chambers to the Southern District courthouse in White Plains, New York in 1995 to be closer to his home. His service terminated on July 9, 2009, due to his death in Bronxville, New York.

=== Notable cases ===
Conner was known as the "ASCAP judge" for his role in administering the terms of a 1941 consent decree imposed against the American Society of Composers, Authors and Publishers as the result of an antitrust case involving claims that the organization had monopolized the licensing of popular music. Conner was assigned the case in the mid-1970s, taking over from Judge Harold R. Tyler, Jr. Among Conner's rulings in the case were his dismissal in the early 1990s of claims that jingle writers were being shortchanged; a 2004 ruling on an agreement covering payments from radio stations for music played on air that brought royalty recipients an estimated $1.7 billion in additional payments from 2001 to 2009; the rejection in 2007 of a request to treat music downloads as performances; and a 2008 decision under which ASCAP would receive 2.5% of revenue from songs played online via streaming media rather than the 3% it had originally sought.

In a 1981 decision later reversed by the United States Court of Appeals for the Second Circuit, in a case brought by Harpo Marx's widow Susan Fleming, Conner ruled that the producers of A Day in Hollywood / A Night in the Ukraine had improperly used the Marx Brothers characters in their Broadway theatre production and that the publicity rights of the comedians, even after their deaths, overrode the First Amendment claims of the show's creators. In April 1980, Conner had refused to issue a preliminary injunction and allowed producer Alexander H. Cohen to open the show as planned.

In a May 1980 ruling, Conner decided that community organizations that placed fliers in personal mailboxes did not violate the law, holding that the organizations' First Amendment rights trumped a 1934 statute imposing a $300 fine for placing mailable material into a mailbox without postage. The organizations that challenged the ban claimed that the cost and delays of using the mail "barred them from effective communication", while the United States Postal Service contended that mailbox security would be lost and that mail carriers would have to waste time checking what's in mailboxes.

In a case filed by a bank that lost $2 million that had been placed in baggage checked on a flight, Conner ruled that Eastern Airlines was responsible only for paying $634.90 for the lost money, charged at the standard rate of $9.07 per pound for lost luggage under the terms of the Warsaw Convention.

== Personal ==
A resident of Dobbs Ferry, New York, Conner died at age 89 in Bronxville, New York. He was survived by his wife, a daughter, three sons and six grandchildren.

Legal offices
Preceded by Edmund Louis Palmieri	Judge of the United States District Court for the Southern District of New York; 1973–1987	Succeeded by Lawrence M. McKenna
