= Lawrence M. McKenna =

American judge (1933–2023)

Senior Judge United States District Court for the Southern District of New York
- In office May 24, 2002 – February 3, 2023

Judge of the United States District Court for the Southern District of New York
- In office April 30, 1990 – May 24, 2002
- Appointed by: George H. W. Bush
- Preceded by: William C. Conner
- Succeeded by: P. Kevin Castel

Personal details
- Born: November 7, 1933; New York City, U.S.
- Died: February 3, 2023 (aged 89); New York City, U.S.
- Children: 4
- Education: Fordham College (BA); Columbia University (LLB)

Lawrence Michael McKenna (November 7, 1933 – February 3, 2023) was a United States district judge of the United States District Court for the Southern District of New York.

== Education and career ==
Lawrence Michael McKenna was born in Manhattan and was raised in Douglaston, Queens. graduated from Regis High School, then received an Artium Baccalaureus degree from Fordham College in 1956. He received a Bachelor of Laws from Columbia Law School in 1959. He was in private practice of law in New York City from 1959 to 1990, at the firm of Simpson Thacher & Bartlett from 1959 to 1969 and at the firm of Wormser, Kiely, Alessandroni, Hyde & McCann from 1969 to 1990.

== Federal judicial service ==
On January 24, 1990, McKenna was nominated by President George H. W. Bush to a seat on the United States District Court for the Southern District of New York vacated by Judge William C. Conner. He was confirmed by the United States Senate on April 27, 1990, and received commission on April 30, 1990. He assumed senior status on May 24, 2002.

In 2001, McKenna struck down two policing policies introduced by Mayor Rudy Giuliani: he ruled that an instance in which the NYPD barred a church from allowing homeless people to sleep there was a violation of the Free Exercise Clause, and stopped the city from requiring a permit for vendors selling art or books in city parks.

== Personal life and death ==
McKenna died under hospice care in Brooklyn on February 3, 2023, at the age of 89.

== Sources ==
Legal offices
Preceded by William C. Conner	Judge of the United States District Court for the Southern District of New York; 1990–2002	Succeeded by P. Kevin Castel
