= Peter Guttridge =

English novelist and critic

Peter Guttridge (born in Burnley, Lancashire) is an English novelist and critic.

== Life ==
He was educated at Burnley Grammar School, the University of Oxford and the University of Nottingham. He is a former director of the Brighton Literature Festival and remains a regular chairperson at major UK book festivals. In 2014 he established Books By The Beach, the Scarborough Book Festival, which runs each April, and remained director until 2018. A freelance journalist for twenty years, specialising in literature and film, he has interviewed numerous writers from around the world and many high-profile actors and film directors. He has also written about astanga vinyasa yoga. He was the Observer newspaper’s crime fiction critic 1999-2011.

Between 1996 and 2005 he wrote an award-winning series of satirical crime novels featuring a yoga-obsessed journalist, Nick Madrid, and his tough-as-nails sidekick, Bridget Frost. His latest publications are the non-comic Brighton crime trilogy: The City of Dreadful Night, The Last King of Brighton and The Thing Itself (formerly God's Lonely Man). The Trilogy and later Brighton books are published in French by Le Rouergue. The other Brighton novels so far in what is now the Brighton series are:The Devil's Moon (2013);Those Who Feel Nothing (2014 - and in its French edition in 2016); Swimming With The Dead (2019); The Lady of The Lake (2019); Butcher's Wood (2021). He has written an e-thriller, Paradise Island. An e-novella, The Belgian and The Beekeeper, is set on the Sussex Downs in 1916, where Sherlock Holmes is asked by a celebrated foreign detective to investigate Dr Watson.

== Bibliography ==
=== Novels ===
- No Laughing Matter. Headline. 1997. ISBN 978-0-7472-5645-8. (reprint Speck Press, 2004, ISBN 978-0-9725776-4-9)
- A Ghost of A Chance (1998)
- Two To Tango (1998)
- The Once and Future Con (1999)
- Foiled Again (2001)
- Cast Adrift (2004)
- City of Dreadful Night (2010)
- The Last King of Brighton (2011)
- The Thing Itself (2012)
- The Belgian and The Beekeeper (novella, e-book original, 2012)
- The Devil's Moon (2013)
- Those Who Feel Nothing (2014)
- Paradise Island (e-thriller original, 2014)
- Swimming With The Dead (2019)
- The Lady of the Lake (2019)
- Butcher's Wood (2021)
- 'The Lord of Terror' (novella, 2023)
- 'The Girl In The Obsidian Mirror (novella, 2023)
- 'The Labyrinth of Porsena' (2023)
- 'The Brighton Trilogy Omnibus' (2023)

=== Short stories ===
- Don’t Think of Tigers [Editor] (2001)
- The Great Detective; (The Mammoth Book of Comic Crime, 2002)
- The Postman Only Rings When He Can Be Bothered (The Mammoth Book of Comic Crime, 2002; Crime Scenes, 2008)
- The Library Sign (The Illustrated Brighton Moment, 2008)
- The Man With The Pram (Criminal Tendencies, 2009)
- God's Lonely Man ('The Mammoth Book of Best British Crime", 2014 - this story the winner of the 2013 Graham Greene International Festival Short Story Competition)
- The Box-Shaped Mystery (Winner Margery Allingham Short Story Competition 2016)
- Normal Rules Do Not Apply (Ten Year Stretch 2018)
- 'The Stuff that Dreams Are Made Of/On' (Collected Peter Guttridge Criminal & Quirky Short Stories 2023)
- 'Go Eat A Cane Toad' (CrimeFest: Leaving The Scene 2025)

=== Non-fiction ===
- The Great Train Robbery (2008)

== Sources ==
- Barry Forshaw: British Crime Writing: An Encyclopedia (Greenwood World Publishing)
