= Geoffrey Abdy Collins =

British solicitor

Sir Geoffrey Abdy Collins (5 June 1888 – 2 November 1986) was a British solicitor who was President of the Law Society from 1951 to 1952.

Educated at Rugby School and Christ's College, Cambridge (BA, LLB), Collins was admitted as a solicitor in 1913. During the First World War, he served in The Rifle Brigade, reaching the rank of captain. He was a member of the Royal United Kingdom Beneficent Association's Committee from 1926 to 1954 (chairman 1950–1954) and of the Council of the Law Society from 1931 to 1956. From 1951 to 1952, he was President of the Law Society. He was knighted in 1952.
