= Mervyn Brooker =

English cricketer and school headmaster (1954–2019)

Personal information
- Full name: Mervyn Edward William Brooker
- Born: 24 March 1954; Burton upon Trent, Staffordshire, England
- Died: 23 January 2019 (aged 64)
- Batting: Right-handed
- Bowling: Right-arm medium

Domestic team information
- Years: Team
- 1982–1986: Staffordshire
- 1976–1980: Cambridgeshire
- 1976: Combined Universities
- 1974–1976: Cambridge University

Career statistics
Competition	First-class	List A
Matches	15	6
Runs scored	43	18
Batting average	3.30	18.00
100s/50s	–/–	–/–
Top score	9	14*
Balls bowled	2,271	312
Wickets	25	4
Bowling average	45.96	41.25
5 wickets in innings	–	–
10 wickets in match	–	–
Best bowling	4/58	3/44
Catches/stumpings	3/–	1/–
- Source: Cricinfo, 7 July 2011

Mervyn Edward William Brooker (24 March 1954 – 23 January 2019) was an English cricketer and school headmaster.

== Early life ==
Mervyn Brooker was born in Burton upon Trent, Staffordshire. He attended Lancaster Royal Grammar School and Burnley Grammar School, before reading geography at Jesus College, Cambridge.

== Cricket ==
Brooker was a right-handed batsman who bowled right-arm medium pace.

Brooker made his first-class debut for Cambridge University against Leicestershire in 1974. He had 13 further first-class appearances for the university, the last of which came against Oxford University in 1976. He took 24 wickets in his 14 first-class matches for the university, at an average of 44.16, with best figures of 4/58. During this time, he also made a single first-class appearance for a combined Oxford and Cambridge Universities team against the touring West Indians. He took the wicket of Roy Fredericks in this match, while with the bat he was dismissed for 7 runs by Michael Holding. He made his List A debut for the university in the 1974 Benson & Hedges Cup, with Brooker making 2 appearances in that competition against Kent and Essex. Later in 1976, he played 4 List A matches for the Combined Universities in the Benson & Hedges Cup. In his 4 matches for the Combined Universities, he took 4 wickets at an average of 23.75, with best figures of 3/44.

While studying at Cambridge University, he made his debut for Cambridgeshire against Norfolk in the 1976 Minor Counties Championship. He played Minor counties cricket for Cambridgeshire from 1976 to 1980, making 16 Minor Counties Championship appearances. He joined his native Staffordshire in 1982, making his debut for the county against Shropshire in the Minor Counties Championship. He played Minor counties cricket for Staffordshire in 1982 and 1986, making 26 Minor Counties Championship appearances and 3 MCCA Knockout Trophy appearances. He made his only List A appearance for Staffordshire against Gloucestershire in the 1984 NatWest Trophy. In this match, he made 14 unbeaten runs, while with the ball he bowled 12 wicket-less overs for the cost of 19 runs.

== Schoolmaster ==
Brooker taught at various English schools including King Edward VI Camp Hill School for Boys where he was headmaster 1995–2002. He was headmaster of Bolton School Boys' Division 2003–08 and education adviser to the King Edward Foundation 2007–11.

== Death ==
After a short and sudden illness, Brooker died on 23 January 2019 from complications arising from contracting meningitis. He is survived by his wife Brigid and their two daughters.
