= New York Intellectual Property Law Association =

- Formation: 1922
- Type: Legal Society
- Headquarters: Garden City, New York
- Location: United States
- President: Robert J. Rando (2023–24)
- Key people: Colman B. Ragan, President-Elect (2019–20); Robert M. Isackson, First Vice President (2019–20); Heather M. Schneider, Second Vice President (2019–20); Abigail Langsam, Treasurer (2019–20); Dyan Finguerra-DuCharme, Secretary (2019–20); Peter G. Thurlow, Immediate Past President (2019–20)
- Website: www.nyipla.org

The New York Intellectual Property Law Association, also known as NYIPLA, is a professional association composed primarily of experienced lawyers interested in intellectual property law. NYIPLA has a membership base of more than 1,500 intellectual property attorneys, practicing throughout the United States and abroad.

== History and purposes ==
NYIPLA was established on March 7, 1922, as the New York Patent Law Association (NYPLA), by a vote of the Committee on Patents and Trademarks of the New York County Lawyers Association.

The stated purposes of NYIPLA currently include promoting "development and administration of intellectual property interests," educating the public and the intellectual property bar in the law of intellectual property, and working with foreign associations to harmonize laws for the protection of intellectual property.

== Membership ==
The membership of NYIPLA primarily comprises lawyers who have been "admitted to practice 3 or more years in any state or territory of the United States, or in the District of Columbia, interested in intellectual property law, of good character and in good standing."

NYIPLA members include lawyers in private, corporate, and government practice, including specialized and general law firms of all sizes, as well as a variety of fields of industry. Members of the judiciary are considered honorary members by virtue of their office. Full membership is geographically limited to individuals who live or work within the jurisdiction of the Second Circuit (New York, Connecticut, and Vermont) or in New Jersey.

== Annual Dinner in Honor of the Federal Judiciary ==
NYIPLA's first Dinner in Honor of the Federal Judiciary was held on December 6, 1922 at the Waldorf-Astoria Hotel. The event has been held annually for over 90 years. The black-tie event, where lawyers mingle with judges, colleagues, and clients, has been called "the social high point of the year for patent attorneys," and has come to be nicknamed the "Patent Prom."

In addition to the dinner, sponsoring law firms provide hospitality suites for pre-party and post-party celebrations. According to a marketing manager for the Waldorf-Astoria, it is that hotel's largest black-tie event of the year. In 2010, about 3,000 patent lawyers and guests attended the dinner, along with 125 federal judges.

== Awards presented ==
Each year since 1987, NYIPLA has presented an Inventor of the Year Award to an inventor or group of inventors.

Since 2003, NYIPLA has also presented an annual Outstanding Public Service Award to one of its current or past members. The first eleven recipients of the Outstanding Public Service Award have been members of the federal judiciary.

The William C. Conner Intellectual Property Law Writing Competition was established by NYIPLA in 1999, to recognize exceptional papers submitted by law students on topics of intellectual property law.

== Inventor of The Year Award ==
Inventor of The Year Award
Name	Organization	Year
Dr. Eren Kurshan	Princeton University	2024
Dr. Andre S. Bachmann, Dr. Caleb P. Bupp, and Dr. Surender Rajasekaran	Michigan State University	2023
Dr. Steven Carlson	OptoDot	2022
Drs. Yancopoulos and Kyratsous	Regeneron Pharmaceuticals Inc.	2021
Dr. Rajiv Joshi	IBM Thomas Watson Research Center	2020
Dr. Sharon Shacham	Karyopharm Therapeutics	2019
Dr. Michael Kass	NVIDIA	2018
Dr. Adrian Krainer	Cold Spring Harbor Laboratory	2017
Dr. Thaddeus Prusik	Temptime Corp.	2016
Dr. Brian D'Andrade	Exponent, Inc.	2015
Drs. Sadelain and Brentjens	Memorial Sloan-Kettering Cancer Center	2014
Drs. Schuchman and Desnick	Icahn School of Medicine at Mount Sinai	2013
Dr. Radoslav Adzic	Brookhaven National Laboratory	2012
Dr. Rajiv Laroia	Qualcomm Flarion	2011
Barber, et al.	High School Students	2011
Dr. Eric R. Fossum	Thayer School of Engineering at Dartmouth	2010
Dr. Sadeg M. Faris	Reveo	2009
Dr. James J. Wynne, Dr. Samuel E. Blum, and Dr. Rangaswamy Srinivasan	IBM	2009
Dr. Bernard S. Meyerson	IBM	2008
Dr. Pedro M. Buarque De Macedo	Catholic University of America	2008
Chang Yi Wang, Ph.D	United Biomedical	2007
Uzoh, et al.	IBM	2006
Dr. Leendert Dorst, Dr. Karen Trovato	Philips Electronics North America	2005
Bonnie Bassler, Ph.D		2004
Dr. Jurg Zimmermann	Novartis	2002
Jay Walker	Priceline.com	2000
Dr. David C. Auth	Heart Technology, Inc.	1994
David T. Green		1991
Dr. John E. Anderson	Union Carbide	1989
Dr. Jack Riseman	IBM	1988
Dr. Leo H. Sternbach		1987
