= John Pickstone =

British historian (1944–2014)

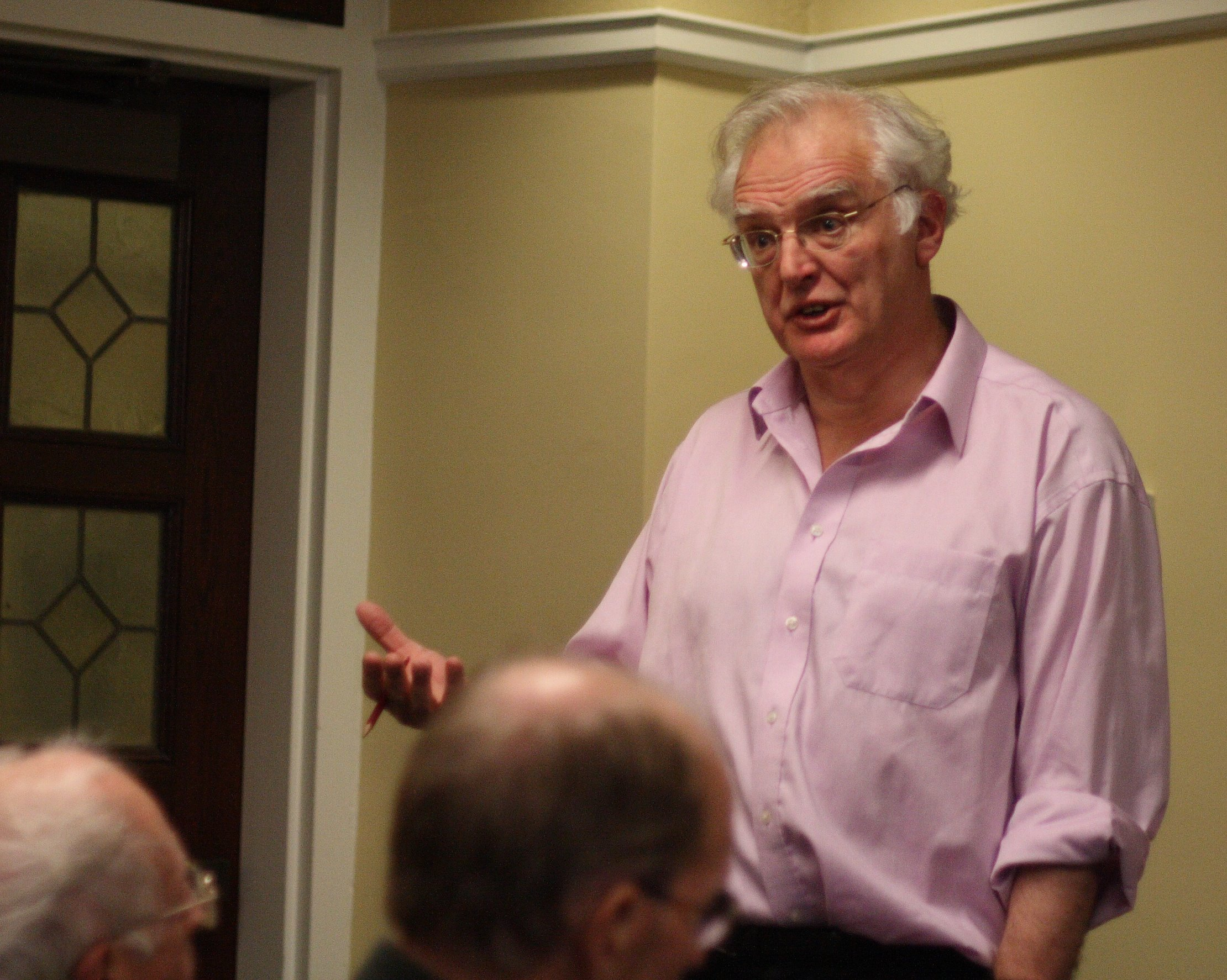
John Pickstone

John Victor Pickstone (29 May 1944 – 12 February 2014) was a British historian of science and the Wellcome Research Professor in the Centre for the History of science, Technology and Medicine, in the Faculty of Life Sciences of the University of Manchester.

== Early years ==
Pickstone was born and raised in Burnley, Lancashire, England, to a Methodist family. After attending Burnley Grammar School, he studied Natural sciences, especially physiology, at Fitzwilliam College, Cambridge and at Queen's University, Kingston, Ontario. After his degree he took an MSc in History and philosophy of science at University College London, 1969, and completed his PhD at Chelsea College London, 1974 (on general physiology in early 19th-century France, especially the work of Dutrochet on osmosis). He has held fellowships in History of medicine at the University of Minnesota (1971–73) and at University College London (1974), before moving in 1974 to the Department of History of science and technology, UMIST, Manchester, to work on the history of hospitals in the Manchester region (Lecturer, 1977, later Senior Lecturer). In the same year he was elected to membership of the Manchester Literary and Philosophical Society on 1 January 1974.

== The middle years ==
In 1985–86, as part of a rationalisation program, he moved to the Victoria University of Manchester and established the Centre for the History of Science and Technology (CHSTM), including the Wellcome Unit for the History of Medicine and the National Archive for the History of computing before directing the Centre until 2002 when he became a Research Professor.

Latterly, Pickstone published mainly on modern medical history, e.g. cancer and medical technology; but also on regional history of STM, on which he edited two journal numbers in 2007. With Roberta Bivins, he edited a volume in honour of the late Roy Porter (Palgrave, 2007) and with Peter Bowler, edited the Cambridge University Press History of Science volume on Modern Earth and Life Sciences (2008). 'Ways of Knowing' continues to attract attention, including a special session at the American history of science conference in Washington, DC, 2007, and an invitation to produce an Osiris volume. With his work on recent medical history, it attracted international invitations; in 2007–2008, this included visits to Yale University, Pennsylvania, Paris, Maastricht, Berlin and Mexico.

For the University of Manchester, he initiated a series of 'Interfaculty Lectures', and with friends in Manchester Metropolitan University and the City, planned a major local history festival for 2009.

== Research interests ==
Pickstone's research interests mostly included aspects of recent medicine, such as the Wellcome project on the history of cancer in Britain, work on medical technology, the history of mental health services, and a collaborative project with the NCRDPC on recent changes in the NHS. In later years, he became increasingly interested in the uses of history for health policy.

His wider work on 'Big Pictures' and 'Ways of Knowing' grew from a conviction that through some of the hundreds of excellent papers produced in history of science, technology and medicine since the 1960s, we might develop new and better frames for understanding long-term history. He explored these themes in relation to medical technologies, science-art relations, science-technology relations, and the display of HSTM in museums.

== Publications ==
Some of his writings he authored as 'John V. Pickstone'.

=== 2009 ===
- (with Chris Philo) Unpromising Configurations: towards local historical geographies of psychiatry. In: Health and Place

=== 2008 ===
- (with David Edgerton), Science, Technology and Medicine in Britain, 1750–2000: Modern Science in National and International Context, Cambridge History of Science, vol. 8
- The Modern Biological and Earth Sciences, Cambridge History of Science, vol. 6

=== 2007 ===
- (with J. Anderson & F. Neary), Surgeons, Manufacturers and Patients: a transatlantic history of total hip replacement, In: Science, Technology and Medicine in Modern History. Palgrave.
- Pickstone, John V. (2007). "Contested Cumulations: Configurations of Cancer Treatments through the Twentieth Century". Bulletin of the History of Medicine. 81 (1): 164–196. doi:10.1353/bhm.2007.0011. PMC 2635842. PMID 17369667.
- Thomas, A. M K; Pickstone, J. (6 January 2007). "Imaging: revealing the world within". BMJ. 334 (suppl_1): s12. doi:10.1136/bmj.39052.527396.94. PMID 17204752. S2CID 11066465.
- (with Roberta Bivins) Madness, Medicine and Social History: essays in honour of Roy Porter, Palgrave
- Medicine in Manchester: Manchester in medicine, 1750–2005, In: Bulletin of the John Rylands University Library, LXXXVII
- Medical History in Manchester: health and healing in an industrial city, 1750–2005. In: Bulletin of the John Rylands University Library, vol. LXXXVII (special number ed. Pickstone & Stella V. F. Butler, with survey article by Pickstone as introduction).
- Science and Technology in Manchester: an introduction to the history. In: Manchester Regional History Review, 18.
- The History of Science and Technology in the Manchester Region: Manchester Regional History Review (special number ed. Pickstone with survey article as introduction, Manchester Regional History Review, 18.
- Pickstone, John V. (September 2007). "Working Knowledges Before and After circa 1800: Practices and Disciplines in the History of Science, Technology, and Medicine". Isis. 98 (3): 489–516. doi:10.1086/521154. PMID 17970423. S2CID 40886779.

=== 2006 ===
- (with J. S. Metcalfe), Replacing Hips and Lenses: Surgery, Industry and Innovation in Post-War Britain, New Technologies in Health Care – Challenges, Change and Innovation, Palgrave
- Innovation, Diverse Knowledges and the Presumed Singularity of Science: Cultures of Technology and the Quest for Innovation, Berghahn Books
- Bones in Lancashire: towards long-term contextual analysis of medical technology, In: Devices and Designs: Medical Technologies in Historical Perspective, Palgrave

=== 2000 ===
- Ways of Knowing: A New History of Science, Technology, and Medicine,Manchester University Press, 2000; University of Chicago Press, 2001
