= Edmund Louis Palmieri =

American judge

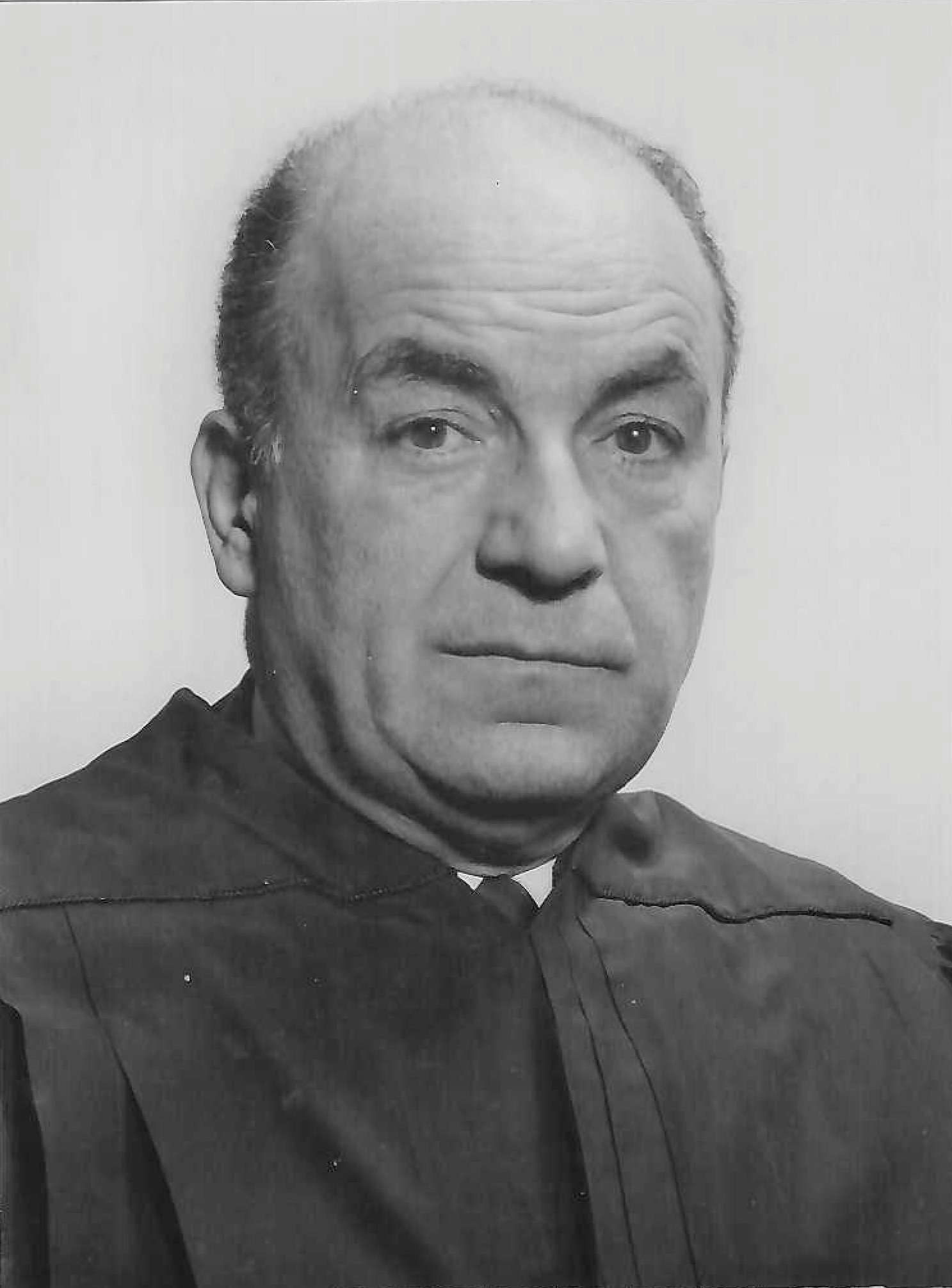

Senior Judge of the United States District Court for the Southern District of New York
- In office June 30, 1972 – June 15, 1989

Judge of the United States District Court for the Southern District of New York
- In office May 12, 1954 – June 30, 1972
- Appointed by: Dwight D. Eisenhower
- Preceded by: Seat established by 68 Stat. 8
- Succeeded by: William C. Conner

Personal details
- Born: May 14, 1907 New York City, New York, U.S.
- Died: June 15, 1989 (aged 82) New York City, New York, U.S.
- Education: Columbia University (BA, LLB)

Edmund Louis Palmieri (May 14, 1907 – June 15, 1989) was a United States district judge of the United States District Court for the Southern District of New York.

== Education and career ==
Born in New York City, New York, Palmieri received an Artium Baccalaureus degree from Columbia University in 1926 and a Bachelor of Laws from Columbia Law School in 1929. He was law secretary for Judge Charles Evans Hughes of the Permanent Court of International Justice in The Hague, Netherlands in 1929. He was in private practice in New York City from 1929 to 1931. He was an Assistant United States Attorney of the Southern District of New York from 1931 to 1934. He was assistant corporation counsel in New York City from 1934 to 1937. He was law secretary for Mayor Fiorello LaGuardia in New York City from 1937 to 1940. He was a City Magistrate of New York from 1940 to 1943. He was in the United States Army during World War II, from 1943 to 1945. He served mostly in Italy and became a major. He was in private practice in New York City from 1945 to 1954.

== Federal judicial service ==
Palmieri was nominated by President Dwight D. Eisenhower on April 6, 1954, to the United States District Court for the Southern District of New York, to a new seat created by 68 Stat. 8. He was confirmed by the United States Senate on May 11, 1954, and received his commission on May 12, 1954. He assumed senior status on June 30, 1972. Palmieri served in that capacity until his death on June 15, 1989, in New York City.

During Palmieri's service on the bench, one of his law clerks was Ruth Bader Ginsburg, who worked for him after her 1959 graduation from Columbia Law School and later served as an Associate Justice of the United States Supreme Court.

== Sources ==
Legal offices
| Preceded by Seat established by 68 Stat. 8 | Judge of the United States District Court for the Southern District of New York; 1954–1972 | Succeeded by William C. Conner |
