= Desmond Heap =

British lawyer (1907–1998)

Sir Desmond Heap (17 September 1907 – 27 June 1998) was a British lawyer and expert on town planning law.

He was born in Burnley, Lancashire, the son of an architect and surveyor, and attended Burnley Grammar School before studying law at Manchester University.

By 1935, he had been appointed as both Deputy Town Clerk of Leeds, and a lecturer in the law of town and country planning at the Leeds School of Architecture.

In 1947, he became Comptroller and City Solicitor of the Corporation of the City of London. He was asked by the Ministry of Town and Country Planning to provide a guidebook to new legislation on town planning then it introduced.

The result was the Encyclopedia of Planning Law and Practice, a loose-leaf work which was constantly updated. In his role in the City of London, he was largely responsible for co-ordinating the rebuilding of the area after the Second World War, and for the sale of London Bridge to a company in Arizona. He retired from the post in 1973.

He was elected President of the Town Planning Institute in 1955 and President of the Law Society in 1972.

He was knighted in the 1970 New Year Honours, and awarded the Royal Town Planning Institute Gold Medal in 1983.

He died at home in Kent at the age of 90.
