= Birketts =

British law firm established in 1863

Birketts LLP
- Headquarters: Ipswich, UK
- No. of offices: 7
- Offices: Bristol, Cambridge, Chelmsford, Ipswich, London, Norwich and Sevenoaks
- No. of employees: 1,095 (2023)
- Major practice areas: General practice
- Revenue: £84.8m (2023)
- Date founded: 1863
- Founder: Benjamin Birkett
- Company type: Limited liability partnership
- Website: www.birketts.co.uk

Birketts LLP is one of the oldest law firms based in the UK. It was established in 1863 by Benjamin Birkett. The firm is often cited by the mainstream media for opinions and analysis on notable cases.

Birketts is a full-service law firm headquartered in Ipswich with additional offices in Bristol, Cambridge, Chelmsford, London, Norwich and Sevenoaks. Their business is divided into four main disciplines which are corporate and commercial, commercial property, commercial and personal litigation, and private client.

It is regulated by the Solicitors Regulation Authority and is accredited by Lexcel and ISO/IEC 27001 and ISO 9001, ISO 14001 and ISO 22301. In the financial year ending 31 May 2023, they had a gross turnover of £84.8m.

Jonathan Agar was appointed Chief Executive of Birketts in March 2023. In April 2026, the firm appointed Barbara Hamilton-Bruce as new Chief Operating Officer. As of 1 April 2026 the firm had 153 Partners.

In 2025 the firm launched their Social Mobility Insight into Law Experience programme (SMILE) which gives students meeting PRIME criteria the opportunity to work at the firm for a week.
