= Designated Professional Body =

According to the UK Financial Conduct Authority (FCA), a Dedicated Professional Body is one designated by the Treasury under section 326 of the Act (Designation of professional bodies) for the purposes of the Act (Provision of Financial Services by Members of the Professions).

The following professional bodies have been designated in the Financial Services and Markets Act 2000 (Designated Professional Bodies) Order 2001 (SI 2001/1226), the Financial Services and Markets Act 2000 (Designated Professional Bodies) (Amendment) Order 2004 (SI 2004/3352) and the Financial Services and Markets Act 2000 (Designated Professional Bodies) (Amendment) Order 2006 (SI 2006/58):

- The Law Society of England & Wales;
- The Law Society of Scotland;
- The Law Society of Northern Ireland;
- The Institute of Chartered Accountants in England and Wales;
- The Institute of Chartered Accountants of Scotland;
- The Institute of Chartered Accountants in Ireland;
- The Association of Chartered Certified Accountants;
- The Institute of Actuaries;
- The Council for Licensed Conveyancers; and
- The Royal Institution of Chartered Surveyors.

Under Section 325(4) of the FSMA, Designated Professional Bodies are required to cooperate with the FCA in a number of ways, including information sharing, in order for the FCA to be able to perform its functions.
