= Philip M. Halpern =

American judge (born 1956)

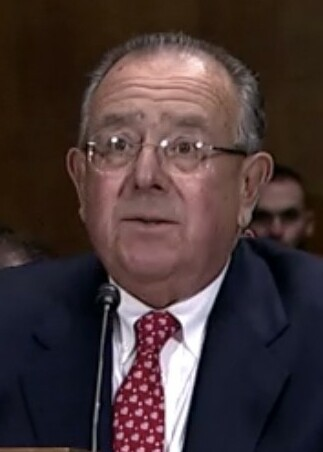

Judge of the United States District Court for the Southern District of New York
- Incumbent
- Assumed office February 21, 2020
- Appointed by: Donald Trump
- Preceded by: P. Kevin Castel

Personal details
- Born: Philip Morgan Halpern; 1956 (age 69–70) Derby, Connecticut, U.S.
- Education: Fordham University (BS); Pace University (JD)

Philip Morgan Halpern (born 1956) is a United States district judge of the United States District Court for the Southern District of New York.

== Education ==
Halpern was born in 1956, in Derby, Connecticut. He received his Bachelor of Science, magna cum laude, from Fordham University, and his Juris Doctor from Pace University School of Law.

== Legal and academic career ==
Upon graduation from law school, he clerked for Judge Irving Ben Cooper of the United States District Court for the Southern District of New York. He was a managing partner of Collier, Halpern & Newberg, LLP, in White Plains, New York, where he focused on commercial, employment, real estate, and securities litigation. One of his former partners at the firm was Albert Pirro. Pirro left the firm in 2000 after being convicted of tax fraud. From 2016 to 2017, and again in 2019 and 2022, he was an adjunct professor at the Elisabeth Haub School of Law at Pace University, where he taught "The Anatomy of a Trial: The Burden of Proof."

== Federal judicial service ==
Halpern was recommended to the White House by former Westchester County District Attorney Jeanine Pirro, a prominent talk show host who is an outspoken supporter of the Trump Administration and the former wife of Halpern's law firm partner. On October 10, 2018, President Donald Trump announced his intent to nominate Halpern to serve as a United States district judge for the United States District Court for the Southern District of New York. On November 13, 2018, his nomination was sent to the Senate. President Trump nominated Halpern to the seat vacated by Judge P. Kevin Castel, who assumed senior status on August 5, 2017.

On January 3, 2019, his nomination was returned to the President under Rule XXXI, Paragraph 6 of the United States Senate. On January 22, 2019, President Trump announced his intent to renominate Halpern for a federal judgeship. His nomination was sent to the Senate the next day. On October 30, 2019, a hearing on his nomination was held before the Senate Judiciary Committee. On November 21, 2019, his nomination was reported out of committee by a 17–5 vote. On February 11, 2020, the Senate invoked cloture on his nomination by a 75–18 vote. On February 12, 2020, his nomination was confirmed by a 77–19 vote. He received his judicial commission on February 21, 2020.

Legal offices
Preceded by P. Kevin Castel	Judge of the United States District Court for the Southern District of New York; 2020–present	Incumbent
