= P. Kevin Castel =

American judge (born 1950)

Peter Kevin Castel
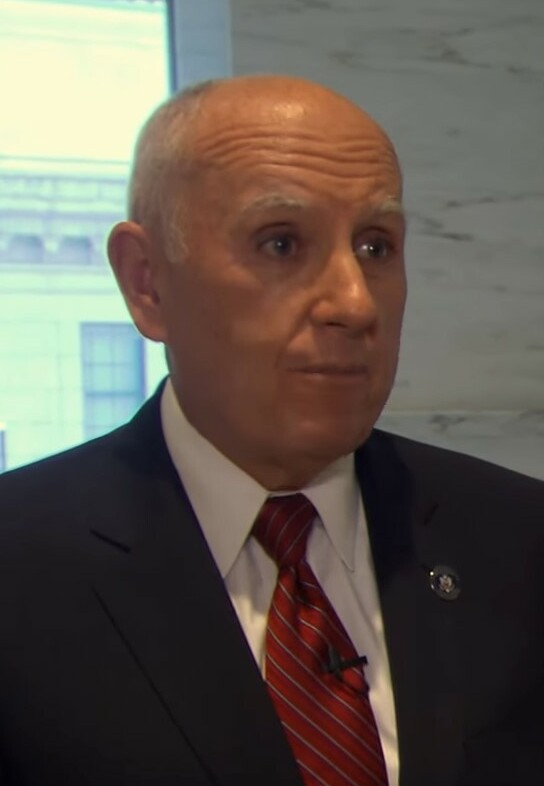
- Castel in 2014

Senior Judge of the United States District Court for the Southern District of New York
- Incumbent
- Assumed office August 5, 2017

Judge of the United States District Court for the Southern District of New York
- In office September 22, 2003 – August 5, 2017
- Appointed by: George W. Bush
- Preceded by: Lawrence M. McKenna
- Succeeded by: Philip M. Halpern

Personal details
- Born: Peter Kevin Castel; 1950 (age 75–76) Jamaica, New York, U.S.
- Education: St. John's University (BS, JD)

Peter Kevin Castel (born 1950) is a senior United States district judge of the United States District Court for the Southern District of New York.

== Biography ==
Castel was born on 1950, in Jamaica, New York. He received a Bachelor of Science degree from St. John's University in 1972 and a Juris Doctor from St. John's University School of Law in 1975. He was a law clerk to Kevin Thomas Duffy of the United States District Court for the Southern District of New York from 1975 to 1977. He was in private practice of law at Cahill Gordon & Reindel in New York City, New York, from 1977 to 2003.

=== Federal judicial service ===
On March 5, 2003, Castel was nominated by President George W. Bush to a seat on the United States District Court for the Southern District of New York vacated by Judge Lawrence M. McKenna. Castel was confirmed by the United States Senate on September 17, 2003, and received his commission on September 22, 2003. He assumed senior status on August 5, 2017.

=== Notable cases ===
BMS Entertainment v. Christopher Bridges and Kanye West, 04-cv-2584: Castel presided over a 2006 copyright-infringement trial against Christopher "Ludacris" Bridges and Kanye West. Bridges and West prevailed over claims that the song "Stand Up" copied from the work of a group of New Jersey musicians.

In re: Bank of America Corp. Securities Litigation, 09-md-2058: Castel presided over a securities-fraud class action arising out of Bank of America's acquisition of Merrill Lynch & Co. during the 2008 financial crisis. In 2013, Castel approved the action's settlement for $2.43 billion.

United States v. One Tyrannosaurus Bataar Skeleton, 13-cv-857: Castel presided over civil forfeiture proceedings relating to the return of a rare Tyrannosaurus Bataar skeleton to the nation of Mongolia.

U.S. Bank National Association v. UBS Real Estate Securities Inc., 12 Civ. 7322: In 2016, Castel presided over a one-month trial of claims brought by investors who asserted that defective residential loans were packaged and sold as residential mortgage-backed securities. After Castel issued a lengthy decision, the parties settled the claims for $850 million.

United States v. Tucker, 16-cr-91: Castel presided over the 2017 criminal trial of Scott Tucker, who was charged with fourteen counts related to his operation of a payday-lending business. The jury returned a guilty verdict on all counts. In 2018, Castel sentenced Tucker to a term of imprisonment of sixteen years and eight months.

United States v. Hernandez, 15-cr-379: Castel presided over the 2019 drug trafficking trial of Juan Antonio Hernandez, a former Honduran congressman and the brother of the then-sitting president of Honduras. A jury returned a guilty verdict on all counts. In 2021, Castel sentenced Hernandez to a term of imprisonment of life plus thirty years. In 2025, Hernandez received a pardon from President Donald Trump, who deemed the case "a Biden administration set-up".

S.E.C. v. Telegram Group, Inc., 19 Civ. 9439: In a March 2020 decision, Castel concluded that the Securities and Exchange Commission was likely to prove that a cryptocurrency issued by the Telegram company qualified as a security and was subject to federal registration requirements. Telegram later agreed to pay $18.5 million in civil penalties.

In re: Google Digital Advertising Antitrust Litigation, 21-md-3010: In 2021, Castel was assigned to preside over a group of civil actions alleging that Google's advertising auctions violated the Sherman Antitrust Act.

Mata v. Avianca, Inc., 22-cv-1461 (PKC): In a June 2023 decision, Castel dismissed the personal injury case against the airline Avianca and issued a $5,000 fine to two lawyers representing the plaintiff, who had submitted fake precedents generated by ChatGPT in their briefs. He noted numerous inconsistencies in the opinion summaries, describing one of the cases' legal analysis as "gibberish". After the decision, the American Bar Association issued in July 2024 its first formal ethics opinion on attorneys using generative AI.

Legal offices
| Preceded by Lawrence M. McKenna | Judge of the United States District Court for the Southern District of New York; 2003–2017 | Succeeded by Philip M. Halpern |
