= Edward Nally (solicitor) =

Edward Nally is a solicitor. He is a Partner of Fieldings Porter, a firm of solicitors in Bolton, and was President of the Law Society in 2004–2005. He is Governor of the College of Law and Chair of Governors at Pendleton Sixth Form College, Salford. He was appointed as a member of the Judicial Appointments Commission in January 2006, as a representative of the legal profession.
