= Civil Resolution Tribunal =

Government administrative tribunal in British Columbia, Canada

Agency overview
- Formed: 2015
- Type: Administrative Tribunal
- Jurisdiction: Government of British Columbia
- Minister responsible: Niki Sharma, Attorney General
- Agency executive: Shelley Lopez, Chair
- Parent department: Ministry of Attorney General
- Website: https://civilresolutionbc.ca/

The Civil Resolution Tribunal (CRT) is Canada's first online administrative tribunal, located in British Columbia (BC), Canada, and created under a provincial statute. It is one of the world's first examples of online dispute resolution (ODR) being incorporated into the public justice system.

== History ==
The CRT was established as a quasi-judicial administrative tribunal under the Civil Resolution Tribunal Act (CRTA), which came into force on March 15, 2013.

The CRTA was intended to establish an accessible and informal process to allow specified minor disputes to be handled efficiently outside the traditional court system. In this way, the CRT supports access to justice.

The CRT derives its powers from statute rather than the inherent jurisdiction of the courts. The CRT chair and members are appointed by the Lieutenant Governor in Council through an Order in Council.

The CRT began public operations on July 13, 2016. It initially had jurisdiction over small claims disputes under $5,000 and strata property (condominium) disputes.

On April 23, 2018, the government of BC introduced legislation to expand the CRT's jurisdiction to include certain motor vehicle accident disputes and disputes under certain sections of the Societies Act and the Cooperative Association Act.

As of 2025, the CRT adjudicates claims related to:

- the Intimate Images Protection Act
- motor vehicle accident claims, including matters related to insurance, accident benefits, the determination of whether an injury is a “minor injury”, and assessment of responsibility for an accident
- small claims up to $5,000
- strata property disputes under the Strata Property Act
- certain disputes related to cooperatives and societies under the Societies Act and the Cooperative Association Act

== CRT rules ==
The Civil Resolution Tribunal (CRT) operates independently and establishes its own rules of practice and procedure. These rules function as an instructional manual, facilitating fairness, transparency, and consistency in the tribunal's operations.

As part of its commitment to upholding these principles, the CRT undertakes regular reviews and updates of its rules. This ensures that the rules remain clear, coherent, and equitable for all parties involved in dispute resolution.

=== Standard rules ===
The Standard Rules apply to all types of CRT disputes other than certain types of claims under the Intimate Images Protection Act. From 2016 to February 2024, the CRT changed its rules sixteen times.

=== Intimate image protection order rules ===
As of February 2024, the CRT had established a second set of rules for the Intimate Images Protection Act.

== Dispute resolution process ==
The CRT provides the public with access to interactive information pathways, tools, and a variety of dispute resolution methods, including negotiation, facilitation, and, if necessary, adjudication. Participants use these justice services through a computer or mobile device. For those who are unable or unwilling to use technology to resolve their disputes, the tribunal provides paper-based or telephone-based services.

=== CRT design - stages 1 to 4 ===
The CRT dispute resolution process has four stages:

1. Apply and respond – make or respond to a claim. This is done using the Solution Explorer, an online tool that presents the legal options for an applicant. The applicant can file a Dispute Notice, which the respondent is given a specific time period to respond to. This can consist of an agreement, a proposed settlement, or a dispute of the claim.
2. Online negotiation with participating parties. If both parties agree, they enter negotiations using online tools to discuss the dispute. If no agreement is reached, a CRT case manager contacts them to begin the facilitation stage.
3. Facilitation with CRT staff. If negotiation is unsuccessful, this stage is undertaken, where CRT facilitators discuss the claims of both parties via phone or email. If this is unsuccessful, the case is moved to adjudication.
4. Adjudication. If the parties are unable to reach a resolution, the dispute goes to adjudication. In most cases, the parties submit written evidence and arguments. Then, an independent tribunal member makes a decision based on the law and the parties’ evidence and arguments. The decision is then peer-reviewed before it is finalized. If the parties disagree with the final decision, they can petition the BC Supreme Court for judicial review.

=== CRT Vice-chair Escalations ===
In November 2022, the CRT created and filled the Vice-chair Escalations position. The Vice-chair Escalations position performs an adjudicative and dispute resolution function within the tribunal. The position receives escalations and decides on interim applications in all disputes.

=== Enforcement ===
Under section 57 of the CRTA, a validated copy of the CRT's order can be enforced through the Supreme Court of British Columbia if it is an order for financial compensation or return of personal property over $35,000. Under section 58 of the CRTA, the order can be enforced through the Provincial Court of British Columbia if it is an order for financial compensation or the return of personal property under $35,000. Once filed, a CRT order has the same force and effect as an order of the court in which it is filed.

=== Judicial review ===
Under section 56.6 of the CRTA, a party may petition the Supreme Court of British Columbia for judicial review of a CRT decision. A petition must commence within 60 days of the date of a CRT decision. In a judicial review, the court generally determines whether the tribunal had the authority to make a particular decision and whether it exercised that authority.

The Supreme Court will not interfere with a CRT decision unless the decision is patently unreasonable. The courts hold that: "Even if the court considers parts of the tribunal's rationale to be flawed or unreasonable, so long as the decision as a whole is reasonable, no patent unreasonableness can be found."

== Annual reports ==
The CRT has published annual reports each fiscal year since 2016–17.

== Chairs ==
- Shannon Salter 2015–2022
- Richard Rogers 2022
- Simmi Sandhu 2022–2023
- Shelley Lopez 2023–present
