= Lexcel =

Lexcel is an accreditation indicating quality in relation to legal practice management standards. It was introduced by The Law Society of England and Wales in 1998. Until 2010, the Lexcel standard was attainable by law firms and in-house legal departments in England and Wales. A separate franchised scheme was available for practices in Northern Ireland. Since September 2010, Lexcel accreditation has been attainable by any law firm or in-house legal department in any jurisdiction in the world. The worldwide scheme continues to be administered by the Law Society of England and Wales.

== Benefits from accreditation ==
The Law Society of England and Wales have carried out research and received feedback from practices which indicate that the benefits of achieving Lexcel accreditation are:

- Effective risk management leading to fewer claims or complaints.
- Better customer service leading to increased client retention.
- Lower professional indemnity insurance premiums or favourable treatment from insurers.
- Improved marketability and competitive advantage.
- Increased success in tenders and panel reviews.
- Helping to demonstrate best value compliance.
- Consistency of service from all solicitors and practice groups.
- Help with new practice rules.
- Increased profitability.

== Sections of the Lexcel standard ==
Version 5 of the standard, published in 2011, is still broken down into eight areas of practice; Structure and Policies, Strategic Plans, Financial Management, Information Management, People Management, Risk Management, Client Care and File and Case Management. Compliance with the standard is ascertained by independent assessment.

The focus of Lexcel has, over time, moved slightly more towards the management of risk. For example, v5 of the standard no longer requires a quality policy (mandatory in ISO9001:2008) but does require policies covering outsourcing, use of social media and conflicts of interest, and procedures covering financial crime.

A number of Lexcel requirements simply reiterate the requirements of regulators, such as the Solicitors Regulation Authority (SRA). All solicitors in England & Wales must meet these regulatory requirements, not just those with Lexcel. For example, the Lexcel requirement 1.4 for a "policy on the avoidance of discrimination" is very similar to the Indicative Behaviours (IB2.1-2.5) in the SRA Handbook 2011.

== Accreditation process ==
Before requesting an independent assessment, a practice or legal department should ascertain how closely aligned to the standard it is. This can be undertaken by completing The Law Society's Self-Assessment Checklist - see 'External Links' below. For organisations requiring consultancy assistance to achieve compliance, they are open to seek assistance from a Law Society accredited consultant. See 'External Links' below for a list.

A practice or legal department wishing to arrange an assessment against the Lexcel Standard will have to do two things. Firstly, select one of The Law Society's licensed assessment bodies to carry out the assessment. They should be contacted to agree the duration of the assessment and the fee payable. See 'External Links' below - for a list of assessment bodies. The assessment body will be able to answer any questions relating to the assessment process and guide the organisation through it. Secondly, the organisation will need to make an application for an assessment directly with The Law Society. This is done by completing the application form - see 'External Links' below. The Law Society charge practices an annual registration fee which varies from £60.00 to £865.00 depending on the size of the practice. Organisations must include with their application:

- details of the practice's approved indemnity insurance provider, claims handler and policy number;
- a full list of all employees (identifying qualified people who earn fees or provide legal advice) and also including staff in support roles;
- a letter authorising the application (only necessary for applying organisations who are not private practice law firms)

== Outcome of assessment ==
If an organisation is correctly aligned with the Standard, the assessment report will be sent to The Law Society and the standard awarded. If an organisation's policies, plans, procedures and processes are not correctly aligned with the Lexcel standard, the assessor will note minor or major 'non-compliances'. Where an organisation is being assessed for the first time, they have up to six months to correct the non-compliances and on completion of any necessary work, will then be awarded the Lexcel Standard. Subsequent assessments will result in minor non-compliances having to be corrected within three weeks and major non-compliances within three months. Award of the standard lasts three years subject to satisfactory annual maintenance visits (AMVs). At the end of the three-year award, if the organisation wishes to continue with Lexcel, a full re-assessment is again undertaken.
