= Bereavement flight =

Discounted airline travel to grieving passengers

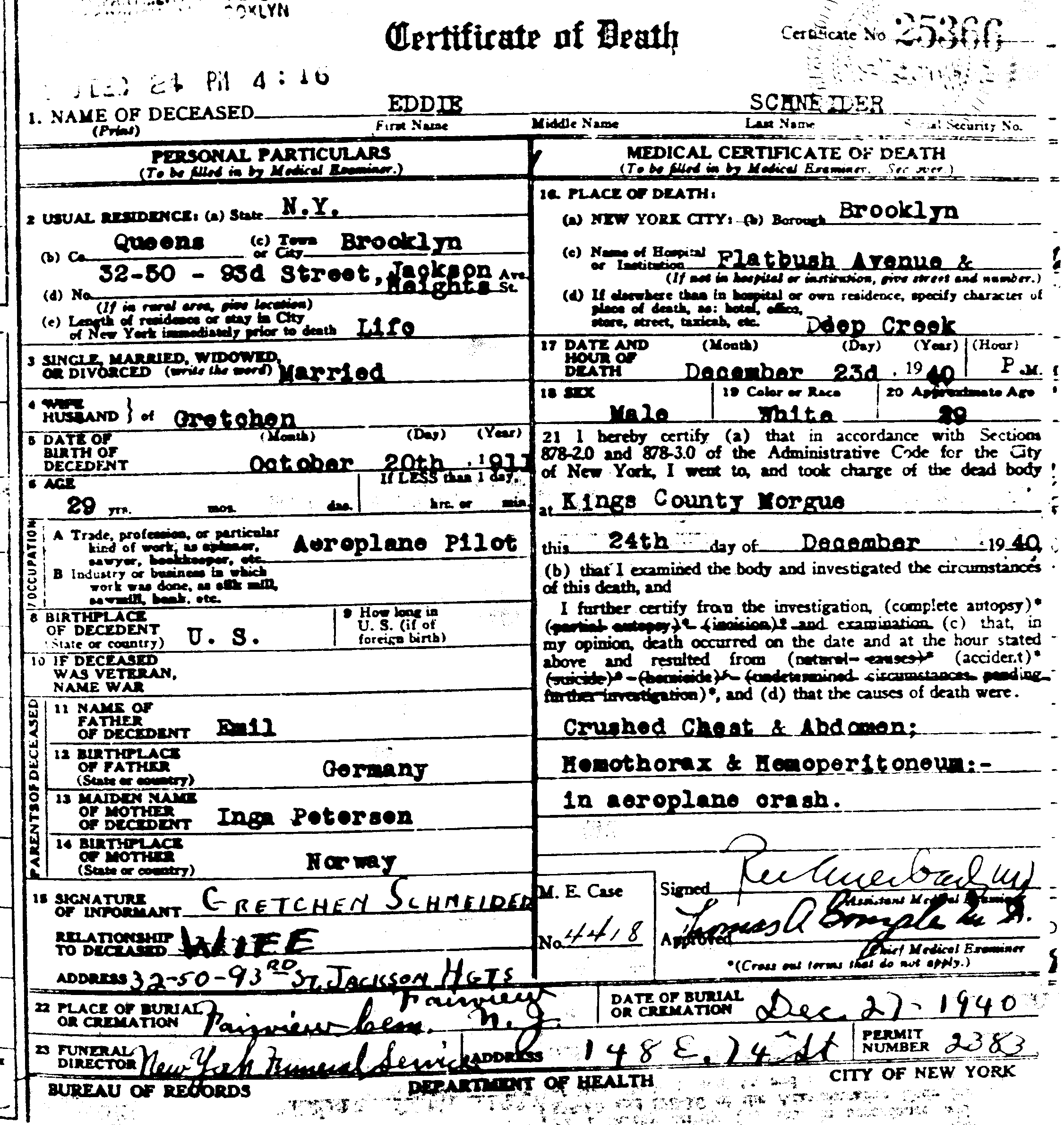
A death certificate (example shown) is required as proof before some bereavement flights.

In the United States and Canada, a bereavement flight is a flight purchased when a close relative has died or is dying. Bereavement fares used to be offered by many airlines, but as of 2015, most have stopped providing them.

Bereavement flights often have flexible rules, and sometimes a reduced rate, however, the price of the fare depends on the airline. Customers may be able to obtain a bereavement fare for last-minute flights that is comparable to that of a regular fare purchased in advance.

Until the late 1990s, it was common for an airline to waive the 7- or 14-day advance purchase rule for bereavements, but in recent years, many airlines have been cutting back on bereavement fares. Instead, many short-notice travelers rely on hidden city fares or other airline booking ploys.

== Policies of various airlines ==
Airlines have varying policies pertaining to bereavement flights. This may include the relatives for which one is eligible to obtain such a ticket, the proof that is required, and the price that is charged in comparison with other fares.

- United Airlines no longer offers bereavement fares, but still has more flexible options for changing and canceling flights. Formerly, it offered bereavement fares of 5% off the ticket price in the event of the death or grave illness of a family member or for individuals seeking medical treatment for tickets sold within six days of travel.
- Delta Air Lines allows discounts for death or imminent death for those who call in advance for reservations.
- Air Canada offers bereavement fares within 7 days of a funeral and for stays of up to 30 days with a copy of a death certificate, a letter from a funeral director, or a certificate from an attending physician. For international itineraries only, the airline will also refund the difference between the regular and the bereavement fare if one of these is presented after travel.
- American Airlines no longer offers a compassion fare for customers traveling due to a medical emergency or death of a family member after the merger with US Airways.
- Alaska Airlines offers a bereavement fare for those traveling due to the death of an immediate family member. This fare is only available within seven days of travel.
- JetBlue, Southwest and Frontier do not offer bereavement fares, but have more flexible options for changing and canceling tickets.

== Other issues ==
=== Family members ===
Airline policies differ concerning which family members are eligible for bereavement fares. Some airlines accommodate only immediate family members; others are more inclusive, offering fares for a variety of familial relations, such as foster relatives, half-relatives, and step-relatives. Airlines have also explored whether same-sex spouses, or domestic partners who are not legal spouses, can be included.

=== Price ===
With the reduced availability of bereavement rates, it has been suggested that cheaper fares can often be found online.
