= Law Society of England and Wales =

Professional association of solicitors in England and Wales

The Law Society
- Founded: 2 June 1825; 201 years ago
- Type: Professional body
- Registration no.: RC000304
- Legal status: Royal Charter company
- Headquarters: 113 Chancery Lane; London, WC2
- Region served: England and Wales
- President: Mark Evans
- Chief executive: Ian Jeffery
- Website: lawsociety.org.uk

The Law Society of England and Wales (officially The Law Society) is the professional body that represents solicitors for the jurisdiction of England and Wales. It provides services and support to practising and training solicitors, as well as serving as a sounding board for law reform. The Law Society was founded in 1825, and its members are often consulted when important issues are being debated in Parliament or by the executive. The Law Society's Hall is located at 113 Chancery Lane in London. There is also a Wales office in Cardiff to focus on matters relating to the Welsh jurisdiction, the Welsh Government and the Senedd.

A president is elected annually to serve for one year. The current president is Mark Evans, who serves as the 181st president of the Law Society and the third Welsh person to hold the office.

The Law Society has no regulatory or representative role in relation to barristers in England and Wales. The relevant professional body for barristers is the General Council of the Bar.

== History ==
The coat of arms of the Law Society

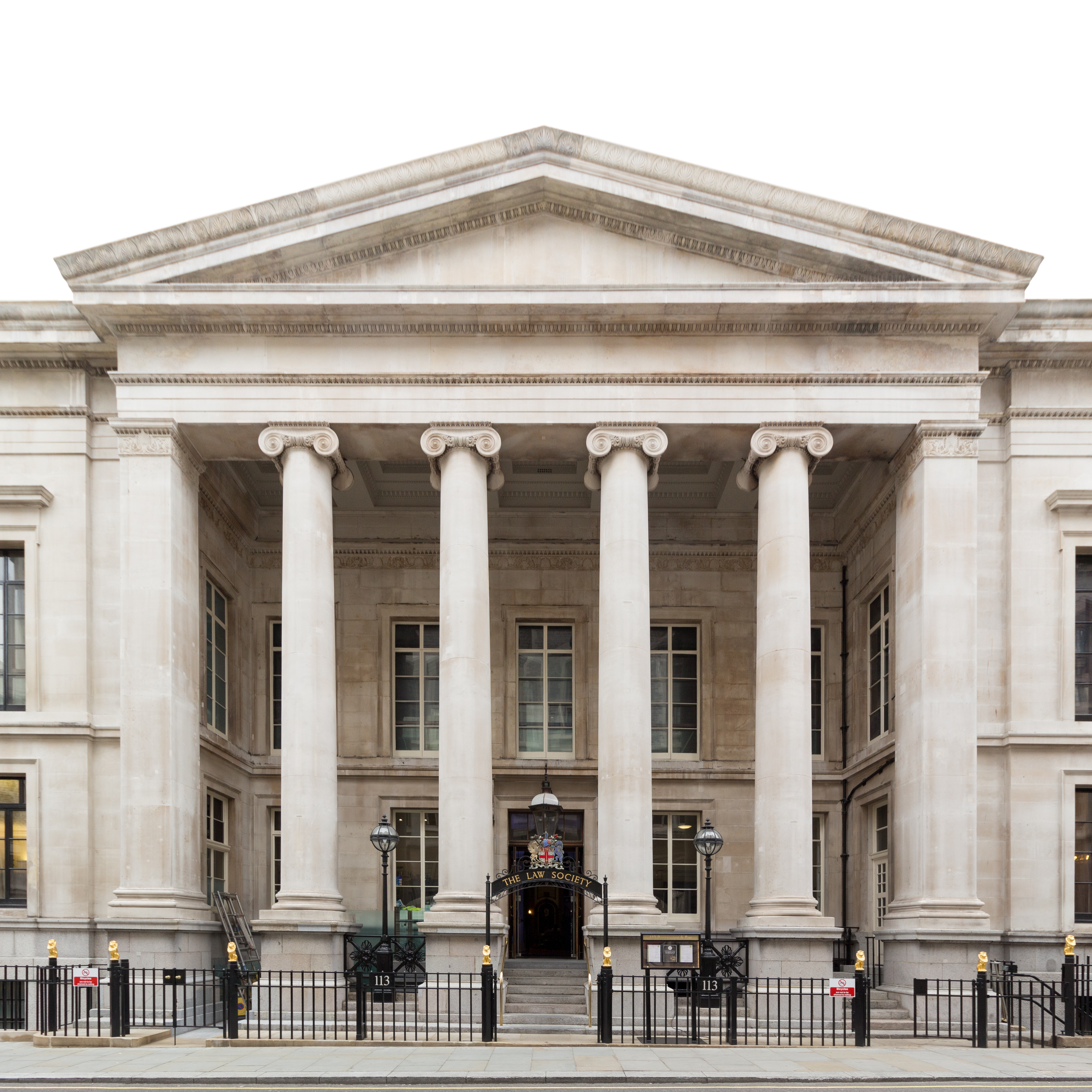
The Law Society's headquarters at 113 Chancery Lane in London

The London Law Institution, the predecessor to the Law Society, was founded in 1823 when many London solicitors came together to raise the reputation of the profession by setting standards and ensuring good practice. The word London was dropped from the name in 1825 to reflect the fact that the Law Institution had national aspirations.

The Law Society was founded on 2 June 1825, when a committee of management was appointed. It acquired its first royal charter in 1831 as The Society of Attorneys, Solicitors, Proctors, and others not being Barristers, practising in the Courts of Law and Equity of the United Kingdom. A new charter in 1845 defined the Society as an independent, private body servicing the affairs of the profession like other professional, literary and scientific bodies. By further royal charter in 1903, the name of the Society was changed to simply The Law Society. It first admitted women members in 1922.

In 1949, the Law Society was given the responsibility of legal aid by the Legal Aid and Advice Act 1949. This function was passed to the Legal Aid Board by the Legal Aid Act 1988.

In July 2013, the Association of Women Solicitors (AWS), a national organisation working with and representing women solicitors in the United Kingdom, merged with the Law Society to form its Women Lawyers Division. Although merged, the AWS operates separately from the Law Society.

=== Discipline ===
In 1834, the Society first initiated proceedings against dishonest practitioners. By 1907, the Society possessed a statutory disciplinary committee and was empowered to investigate solicitors' accounts and to issue annual practising certificates. In 1983, the Society established the Office for the Supervision of Solicitors to deal with complaints about solicitors. Complaints regarding the conduct of solicitors are now dealt with by the Solicitors Regulation Authority (SRA). However, complaints regarding poor service are the remit of the Legal Ombudsman.

=== Legal education ===
The Solicitors Act 1860 enabled the Society to create a three-tier examination system. In 1903, the Society established its own Law Society School of Law, which later merged with tutorial firm Gibson and Weldon to become the independent College of Law. By 1922, the Law Society required a compulsory academic year for all clerks.

== Regulatory body status ==
mbudsman]], which is a single portal for complaints by the public made against all providers of legal services, including the Bar, licensed conveyancers etc. – but excluding unqualified will-writers.

The regulatory body for solicitors is the Solicitors Regulation Authority (SRA). It is an Independent Division of the Law Society Group which regulates and enforces regulation completely independently of the Law Society.

The Law Society remains the approved regulator, although following the Legal Services Act 2007, a new body – the Legal Services Board (currently chaired by Monisha Shah) – oversees all the approved regulators including the General Council of the Bar, which divested its regulatory functions to the Bar Standards Board. The Law Society is a Designated Professional Body under the Financial Services and Markets Act 2000.

== The Law Society's Hall ==
Located at 113 Chancery Lane in London, The Law Society's Hall is the principal building of the Society. Constructed in 1832, the building is Grade II* listed. The architect was Lewis Vulliamy. An extension in 1902-04 was designed by Charles Holden. In addition to offices for its staff, the building is used for Law Society conferences and events, and parts of the building are available on a private hire basis for events.

== Past presidents ==
Source: "Past Presidents", The Law Society of England and Wales. Retrieved 8 June 2025.

The arms of the Law Society

- 2024-25 Richard Atkinson (180th president)
- 2023-24 Nick Emmerson (179th president)
- 2022-23 Lubna Shuja (178th president)
- 2021-22 I. Stephanie Boyce (177th president)
- 2020–21 David Greene (176th president)
- 2019–20 Simon Davis (175th president)
- 2018–19 Christina Blacklaws (174th president)
- 2017–18 Joe Egan
- 2016–17 Robert Henry Glanville Bourns, DL
- 2015–16 Jonathan Robert Saville Smithers
- 2014–15 Andrew Howard Arthur Caplen
- 2013–14 Nicholas Peter Fluck
- 2012–13 Lucy Ann Scott-Moncrieff (later CBE)
- 2011–12 John Prier Wotton
- 2010–11 Linda Karen Hadfield Lee
- 2009–10 Robert Alan Heslett
- 2008–09 Paul Henry Marsh
- 2007–08 William Andrew Myers Holroyd (later CBE)
- 2006–07 Fiona Woolf (later DBE)
- 2005–06 Kevin Joseph Martin
- 2004–05 Edward Nally
- 2003–04 Peter John Williamson
- 2002–03 Carolyn Kirby (later OBE)
- 2001–02 David Angus McIntosh
- 2000–01 Thomas Michael Napier
- 1999–2000 Robert Sayer
- 1998–99 Michael Robert Mathews
- 1997–98 Phillip Sycamore (later CBE)
- 1996–97 John Anthony Girling
- 1995–96 Martin John Patrick Mears
- 1994–95 Richard Charles Elly, FRSA, DL
- 1993–94 Rodger John Pannone, DL
- 1992–93 Mark Hebberton Sheldon (later CBE)
- 1991–92 Philip Thomas Ely (later OBE)
- 1990–91 John Anthony Holland (later knighted)
- 1989–90 David Ward
- 1988–89 Sir Richard Kennedy Harvey Gaskell
- 1987–88 Sir John Derek Richardson Bradbeer, OBE, TD
- 1986–87 Sir John Michael Wickerson
- 1985–86 Sir Colin Alan Bettridge Leslie
- 1984–85 Sir Arthur Hugh Hoole
- 1983–84 Sir Christopher Raynor Hewetson
- 1982–83 Sir William Maxwell Harries Williams
- 1981–82 Sir Denis Alfred Marshall
- 1980–81 Sir Jonathan Dennis Clarke
- 1979–80 Sir John Chalmer Stebbings
- 1978–79 Sir John Chance Palmer
- 1977–78 Sir Richard Kenneth Denby
- 1976–77 Sir David Napley
- 1975–76 Sir Edmund Naylor Liggins, TD
- 1974–75 Sir Edward Henry Sibbald Singleton
- 1973–74 Sir Martin Llewellyn Edwards
- 1972–73 Sir Desmond Heap
- 1971–72 Sir William Oscar Carter
- 1970–71 Sir Godfrey William Rowland Morley, OBE, TD
- 1969–70 Sir Robert Frederick Payne
- 1968–69 Sir Henry Edmund Sargant
- 1967–68 Sir John Renwick, JP
- 1966–67 Sir Charles Hilary Scott
- 1965–66 Sir Derek Percy Hilton, MBE
- 1964–65 Sir Robert John Formby Burrows
- 1963–64 Sir Ronald Long
- 1962–63 Sir Henry Brailsford Lawson
- 1961–62 Sir Arthur John Driver
- 1960–61 Colonel Sir Denys Theodore Hicks
- 1959–60 Sir Sydney Charles Thomas Littlewood
- 1958–59 Sir Leslie Ernest Peppiatt
- 1957–58 Sir Ian David Yeaman
- 1956–57 Edwin Herbert, Baron Tangley
- 1955–56 Sir Walter Charles Norton
- 1954–55 Frederic Hubert Jessop
- 1953–54 Sir William Charles Crocker
- 1952–53 Sir Dingwall Latham Bateson
- 1951–52 Sir Geoffrey Abdy Collins
- 1950–51 Sir Leonard Stanistreet Holmes
- 1949–50 Sir Harold Nevil Smart
- 1948-49 Sir William Alan Gillett
- 1947-48 Colonel William Mackenzie Smith DSO TD
- 1946–47 Sir Douglas Thornbury Garrett
- 1945–46 Sir Hugh Matheson Foster, TD
- 1944–45 Sir Arthur Croke Morgan
- 1943–44 Sir Ernest Edward Bird
- 1942–43 Sir George Stanley Pott
- 1941–42 The Right Hon. Sir Dennis Henry Herbert, KBE, MP (later Baron Hemingford)
- 1940–41 Lt-Col. Samuel Tomkins Maynard, TD, JP
- 1939–40 Randle Fynes Wilson Holme
- 1938–39 Sir William Waymouth Gibson
- 1937–38 Sir Francis Edward James Smith
- 1936–37 Sir Hubert Arthur Dowson
- 1934–35 Harry Rowsell Blaker
- 1933–34 Sir Reginald Ward Poole, KCVO
- 1932–33 Charles Edward Barry
- 1931–32 Sir Philip Hubert Martineau
- 1930–31 Sir John Roger Burrow Gregory
- 1929–30 Walter Henry Foster
- 1928–29 Sir Robert Mills Welsford
- 1927–28 Sir Cecil Coward
- 1926–27 Alfred Henry Coley
- 1925–26 Sir Herbert Gibson, Bt
- 1924–25 William H. Norton
- 1923–24 Sir Robert William Dibdin
- 1922–23 Sir Arthur Copson Peake
- 1921–22 J. J. Dumville Botterell
- 1920–21 Sir Charles Morton
- 1919–20 William A. Sharpe
- 1918–19 Sir Richard Pinsent, Bt
- 1917–18 Samuel Garrett
- 1916–17 Thomas Eggar
- 1915–16 Sir Richard Taylor
- 1914–15 Col. Sir Charles Longmore, KCB
- 1913–14 Sir Walter Trower
- 1912–13 Charles L. Samson
- 1911–12 William John Humfrey
- 1910–11 Sir Henry Johnson
- 1909–10 Sir William Winterbotham
- 1908–09 James Samuel Beale
- 1907–08 Edmund Kell Blyth
- 1906–07 Henry Attlee (father of prime minister Clement Attlee)
- 1905–06 Charles Mylne Barker
- 1904–05 Thomas Rawle
- 1903–04 Sir John Gray Hill
- 1902–03 Sir Albert Rollit
- 1901–02 Sir Henry Fowler
- 1900–01 Robert Ellett
- 1899–1900 Sir Henry Manisty
- 1898–99 Charles B. Margetts
- 1897–98 William Godden
- 1896–97 Joseph Addison
- 1895–96 John Wreford Budd
- 1894–95 John Hunter
- 1893–94 Frederic P. Morrell
- 1892–93 Richard Pennington
- 1891–92 William Melmoth Walters
- 1890–91 Robert Cunliffe
- 1889–90 Grinham Keen
- 1888–89 Benjamin G. Lake
- 1887–88 Henry Markby
- 1886–87 (Sir) Henry Watson Parker
- 1885–86 Henry Roscoe
- 1884–85 Cornelius T. Saunders
- 1883–84 Ebenezer John Bristow
- 1882–83 Sir Thomas Paine
- 1881–82 Charles Claridge Druce
- 1880–81 John Moxon Clabon
- 1879–80 Nathaniel Tertius Lawrence
- 1878—79 Sir John Hollams
- 1877–78 Edward Frederick Burton
- 1876–77 Henry Thomas Young
- 1875—76 George Burrow Gregory, MP
- 1874–75 Francis Thomas Bircham
- 1873–74 Frederick Halsey Janson
- 1872–73 Park Nelson
- 1871–72 Frederic Ouvry
- 1870–71 William Ford
- 1869–70 Edward Lawrance
- 1868–69 John Henry Bolton
- 1867–68 Bartle J. L. Frere
- 1866–67 Alfred Bell
- 1865–66 William Williams
- 1864–65 Edward Savage Bailey
- 1863–64 James Leman
- 1862–63 William Sharpe
- 1861–62 Joseph Maynard
- 1860–61 William Strickland Cookson
- 1859–60 John Irving Glennie
- 1858–59 John Young
- 1857–58 Edward Leigh Pemberton
- 1856–57 Edward White
- 1855–56 Keith Barnes
- 1854–55 John J. J. Sudlow
- 1853–54 George H. Kinderley
- 1852–53 John Coverdale
- 1851–52 John Swarbreck Gregory
- 1850–51 Richard Harrison
- 1849–50 Thomas Clarke
- 1848–49 Benjamin Austen
- 1847–48 Charles Ranken
- 1846–47 Edward Rowland Pickering
- 1845–46 Michael Clayton

=== Chairmen ===
Before 1845, the head of the Society's committee was called the Chairman.

- 1844 Edward Foss
- 1843 Edward Foss
- 1842 Edward Archer Wilde
- 1841 Thomas Metcalfe
- 1840 John Teesdale
- 1839 Iltid Nicholl
- 1838 Thomas Adlington
- 1837 William Tooke, MP
- 1836 George Frere
- 1835 George Frere
- 1835 James William Freshfield, MP
- 1834 Bryan Holme
- 1834 William Lowe
- 1833 Richard White

== Standard Conditions of Sale ==
The "Standard Conditions of Sale" are issued by the Law Society to provide a standard set of rules and expectations for the sale and purchase of residential property in England and Wales. As a contractual instrument they are intended "to create legal rights and legal obligations" on the part of both parties to a transaction. The fifth (current) edition was initially published in 2011, and was revised in 2018. The majority of residential property sales are subject to these conditions.

== See also ==
- Law Society Gazette
- Law Society of Northern Ireland
- Law Society of Scotland
- Legal Complaints Service
- Lexcel
