= Stephen Mayson =

British legal scholar and policy adviser

- Education: University of Manchester (LL.B.); University College London (LL.M.); Nottingham Law School (Ph.D.)
- Occupations: Legal scholar, policy adviser, consultant
- Employer(s): University College London; University of Law
- Known for: Independent Review of Legal Services Regulation (IRLSR)
- Title: Honorary Professor of Law, UCL; Emeritus Professor, University of Law

Stephen Mayson is a British legal scholar, policy adviser, and consultant on legal services. He is Honorary Professor of Law at University College London and emeritus Professor at the University of Law. Mayson is noted for his work on the regulation of legal services in England and Wales, including leading the Independent Review of Legal Services Regulation (IRLSR), and for publications on law firm strategy and legal ethics.

== Early life and education ==
Mayson studied law at the University of Manchester, graduating with an LL.B. He obtained an LL.M. from University College London and later completed a Ph.D. at Nottingham Law School.

He was called to the Bar of Lincoln's Inn in 1977 and became a Bencher in 2016.

== Academic career ==
From 1977 to 1982, Mayson was a lecturer at the Inns of Court School of Law and an examiner for the Council of Legal Education. In 1991, he joined Nottingham Law School as Professor of Legal Practice (1993–2006) and helped develop the world's first MBA in Legal Practice.

He later served as Director of the Legal Services Institute, a think tank of the College of Law (2006–2013). He also held visiting positions at the University of Melbourne Faculty of Law, the IE Law School in Madrid, and the University of Western Sydney.

Since 2013, Mayson has been Honorary Professor of Law at UCL, affiliated with its Centre for Ethics and Law.

== Advisory and consultancy work ==
Alongside academic roles, Mayson has been active as a consultant, adviser and non-executive director to law firms, barristers’ chambers, regulators, and governments. He began his professional career at Clifford-Turner (now Clifford Chance LLP) as a tax lawyer and later joined strategic consultancies including the David Andrews Partnership and Hildebrandt International.

His independent consultancy work has covered law firm strategy, valuation, governance, and professional ethics, with clients across Europe, North America, Asia and Australasia.

== Public and regulatory roles ==
Mayson has held a number of public appointments in the regulation of legal services:

- Chair of the Legislative Options Review of the Legal Services Act 2007 (2014–2015) for the Ministry of Justice.
- Member of the Expert Advisory Panel for the Independent Review of Criminal Legal Aid (2021).
- Member of policy and advisory groups for the Ministry of Justice, Solicitors Regulation Authority, Legal Services Board, Bar Standards Board, Law Society of England and Wales, and the Legal Ombudsman.

He has also acted as an independent reviewer for the Office of the Attorney General in Ireland and as a member of the Taoiseach's Review Group on the Law Offices of the State in the 1990s.

== Independent Review of Legal Services Regulation ==
In 2018, Mayson was appointed to lead the Independent Review of Legal Services Regulation (IRLSR) in England and Wales, supported by the UCL Centre for Ethics and Law.

The review published its main report in June 2020, recommending reform of the regulatory framework to reduce consumer harm, ensure public interest protections, and extend oversight to unregulated legal services, including those driven by artificial intelligence. Follow-up reports in 2022 and 2024 examined consumer detriment and the public interest in greater depth.

== Publications ==
Mayson has written widely on legal services strategy and regulation. His major works include:

- Making Sense of Law Firms (Oxford University Press, 1997)
- Law Firm Strategy: Competitive Advantage and Valuation (Oxford University Press, 2007)
- Company Law, with Derek French and Christopher Ryan (38th ed., Oxford University Press, 2023)

He has also contributed to reports such as Mapping the Moral Compass (on ethical leadership) and the IRLSR series.

== Other activities ==
Mayson was chair of governors of Bedford School (2010–2018) and is a trustee and deputy chair of the Harpur Trust.
