= Legal Services Complaints Commissioner =

In England and Wales, the Legal Services Complaints Commissioner was a statutory office that regulates solicitors, but not barristers. A Commissioner could be appointed by, and is answerable to, the Lord Chancellor and Secretary of State for Justice. It has been superseded by the Legal Ombudsman.

== History ==
When the Access to Justice Act 1999 came into force, government minister Keith Vaz stated to the House of Commons:

... we do not propose to appoint a Commissioner, ... unless and until a professional body is clearly failing to make substantial progress in improving its complaints record.

In September 2003, Lord Chancellor Lord Falconer, criticised the Law Society, the governing body of solicitors, saying:

Unfortunately in spite of all efforts, complaints handling is still not efficient and effective.

As a result, the Lord Chancellor exercised his powers under the Act to appoint Zahida Manzoor as Commissioner in February 2004. The Commissioner's powers as to the Law Society were to:

- Require them to report on their handling of complaints about solicitors;
- Investigate the handling of complaints;
- Make recommendations;
- Set targets;
- Require the Law Society to submit a plan for the handling of complaints.

If the Law Society failed to submit a plan or adequately handle complaints, the Commissioner could impose a penalty of up to £1 million, or 1% of the Society's annual income if that is less.

In 2005, the Law Society divided its functions among the Society, the Solicitors Regulation Authority and the Legal Complaints Service but by May 2006, the Society's efforts to remedy its own deficiencies were still giving concern to the Commissioner. As a result, a penalty of £220,000 was levied. The Commissioner subsequently recognised that progress was being made and in April 2007, advised the Society that their Complaints Handling Plan adequately addressed the concerns. However, in April 2008, the Commissioner reported that "Results show that despite some improvements in all target areas set, there are still failures ... to consistently apply their policies, processes and customer standards." On 3 June 2008, the Commissioner fined the Law Society £275,000 over the inadequacy of its complaints handling plan for the forthcoming year.

== Reform ==
Now that the Legal Services Act 2007 has fully comes into force, the Commissioner role has been abolished. The Office for Legal Complaints now runs the Legal Ombudsman scheme; which will supervise the complaints handling of solicitors, barristers and other legal professionals.

== Bibliography ==
- Legal Services Complaints Commissioner (2005). "Annual Report 2004-2005" (PDF). Law in Order: your right to expect better. London: The Stationery Office. Archived from the original (PDF) on 2009-06-07. "HC 166"
- Legal Services Complaints Commissioner (2006). "Annual Report 2005-2006" (PDF). Actions not words: consumers matter. London: The Stationery Office. Archived from the original (PDF) on 2008-07-28. "HC 1225"
- Legal Services Complaints Commissioner (2007). "Annual Report 2006-2007" (PDF). Cycle of change. London: The Stationery Office. Archived from the original (PDF) on 2010-02-10. "HC 676"
- Legal Services Complaints Commissioner (2008). "Annual Report 2007-2008". A Work in Progress. London: The Stationery Office. Archived from the original on 2008-12-06. "HC 840"
