= Law costs draftsman =

Class of lawyer in English law

In English law, a law costs draftsman is a specialist lawyer who settles the legal costs of a court case. The role of the law costs draftsman centres on a procedure known as the detailed assessment of costs, which is controlled by statute in England and Wales. They are concerned with costs relating to all areas of the law and deal with every conceivable type of legal matter that touches upon the subject of costs. An experienced and competent law costs professional may command a salary on a par with that of a solicitor or legal executive, with regulated individuals attaining the qualification and status of a regulated Costs Lawyer.

== Main roles ==
=== Inter partes costs ===
The unsuccessful litigant is usually ordered to pay the successful litigant’s costs (inter partes costs) and, if those costs cannot be agreed, a detailed bill of costs is prepared and served. The paying party then has to serve a schedule of points of those items in the bill he wishes to dispute before the bill is lodged at court and a detailed assessment hearing takes place at which the points are argued and a decision made by the court. A law costs draftsman can be involved in all the necessary procedural steps for either party and can also be involved in preparing case budgets.

=== Solicitor's fees ===
Solicitor's fees are costs payable by a client to his own solicitor. Different rules apply to the costs where court proceedings have been commenced, known as contentious business, to those applicable to non-contentious matters such as conveyancing, probate and general advice. A client who is unhappy with his solicitor’s bill has remedies available if he wishes to challenge it. If either the client or the solicitor is dissatisfied with the outcome of that request or if the bill relates to contentious business, either the client or the solicitor may apply to the court for the bill to be assessed. A law costs draftsman may be instructed to prepare a detailed bill of costs for assessment, to advise on law and procedure and, subsequently, if instructed by a solicitor or a litigant, to argue in support or to oppose the bill.

=== Legal aid costs ===
Where a solicitor is representing a publicly funded client, a detailed bill is usually required to be assessed either by the court or the Legal Aid Agency before payment can be made out of the community legal fund to the solicitor. Whilst such bills are usually assessed without any formal hearing, if an amount has been disallowed in respect of which the solicitor wishes to object, an appointment can be obtained and the matter argued at a hearing. In criminal cases, the objections to an amount disallowed are usually made in writing and, often, a law costs draftsman will be instructed to prepare the written submissions.

Where a case is publicly funded, costs must be assessed and approved before the legal aid can be paid to the solicitor representing the legal aid client. If the total amount claimed is less than £2500 then a CLAIM 1 form is prepared by the costs draftsman and assessed by the Legal Aid Agency. Where costs exceed £2500 a bill of costs, similar in format to that prepared for detailed assessment of inter partes costs, is prepared and this is assessed by the Court before being paid by the Agency.

== Legal status ==
A Costs Draftsman is not regulated and therefore cannot independently attest to the accuracy of costs documents (such as a Bill of Costs) and does not have rights of audience in Court, unless they have delegated supervision from a regulated individual, such as a Solicitor or Legal Executive (CILEX).

The requirement to attend court to oppose or support a bill of costs may however, arise in any of the above three categories. Members of the Association who are qualified as costs lawyers have a right of audience and are entitled to appear as an advocate in relation to disputes as to costs. In addition under the Civil Procedure Rules 1999, a Fellow of the Association may be instructed as an expert by a litigant in person to advise on aspects of costs law and the litigant may recover any reasonable fees thereby incurred if he is awarded costs in his favour. Higher value matters are generally referred to Regional Costs Judges. Claims based in London are referred to the Senior Courts Costs Office (previously named the Supreme Court Costs Office).

Law costs draftsmen must be skilled in the application of the statutory law relating to legal costs, and be familiar with the system of legal fees. For this reason, many firms of litigation solicitors retain law costs draftsmen as employees. Others rely on the services of dedicated costs drafting organisations and independent draftsmen.

Since 1 January 2007, by virtue of the Association of Law Costs Draftsmen Order 2006, the ALCD has been capable of granting rights of audience to its members. In 2007, in light of the procurement of rights of audience, the ALCD has bestowed the title of "costs lawyer" upon all Fellows of the Association who have successfully completed a designated advocacy course. Such rights have considerably enhanced the status and reputation of those in the profession who have qualified as costs lawyers.

== See also ==
- Association of Costs Lawyers
- Costs lawyer
