= Accident Advice Helpline =

British personal injury firm

- Type: Private company
- Industry: Personal injury
- Founded: June 1, 2000 in the West End of London
- Founders: Lawrence Beck and Darren Werth
- Defunct: 2013
- Fate: Acquired after legislative changes
- Successor: Quindell plc (later Watchstone plc)
- Headquarters: Watford, Hertfordshire, United Kingdom
- Area served: United Kingdom
- Products: Personal injury legal claims
- Services: No win no fee personal injury claims
- Number of employees: 150 (2004)
- Website: accidentadvicehelpline.co.uk

Accident Advice Helpline (AAH) was a British a personal injury law firm and former claims management company located in Watford, Hertfordshire.

They specialised in helping people claim injury compensation under the terms of the conditional fee agreement, colloquially known as no win no fee in the UK. The company was sold to Quindell plc in 2013 after regulatory changes again made referral fees illegal. Its web site was closed down in 2020.

== History ==
The company was founded on 1 June 2000 by Lawrence Beck and Darren Werth as a claims management company (CMC) and was originally based in the West End of London, before moving to Golders Green.

The company started out offering accident management services for people involved in non-fault road traffic accidents. This involved arranging hire cars and crash repairs to victims of road traffic accidents and referring them to solicitors to pursue compensation for injuries sustained. The company then became more focused on offering services to victims of all types of personal injuries, including accidents at work and injuries sustained whilst in public places. By 2004 it had a staff of over 150 people.

CMCs gained prominence after legal aid was abolished for "most personal injury claims" in 2000. They acted as middle men between claimants and solicitors, advertising heavily to attract victims, and charging solicitors fees for investigative work done during the referral process. In 2004 courts found that some CMC fees were actually illegal referral fees, and CMCs began facing regulatory scrutiny and competition from solicitors groups. AAH founder Lawrence Beck defended the industry claiming the lawyers charged exorbitant fees, did not have the skill set required for advertising/marketing, and were rarely available to small claims clients after business hours.

From 2000 to 2004 there was a rise in false claims across the industry, and many CMCs were derided as ambulance chasers.

The company went into administration in 2004; a director of the parent group Accident Advice Holdings said that this was because First National Bank, one of its financial backers, withdrew from the no-win-no-fee market following the collapse of another firm they had backed, The Accident Group. A new company, Accident Advice Helpline Direct Group Ltd, was set up.

AAH was credited by a government report for helping set up the Claims Standards Council and pushing for regulation in the industry. Referral fees were permitted by solicitors in 2004 and further regulation began in 2007.

Since 2004 the company ran the AAH Liberty Scheme. This scheme worked on a no win no fee basis.

AAH was sold to Quindell in 2013 after regulatory changes again made referral fees illegal. Under Quindell the company vertically integrated with solicitors to manage the entire claim.

== Association with Claims Standards Council ==
Accident Advice's managing director, Darren Werth, was the Chairman of the Claims Standards Council, a trade body representing the industry.

== Marketing ==
=== Promotional campaigns ===
The company was endorsed by journalist and tv presenter Esther Rantzen, former host of That's Life!. Rantzen faced criticism from MP Claire Ward for the ad's format, which was very similar to her daytime chat show Esther.

=== Spam texts ===
In 2011 almost one in three mobile customers in the UK were receiving spam texts promoting accident claims, debt management and insurance companies including AAH. This furthered calls to again ban referral payments.
