= Legal Services Ombudsman =

Bangladesh

In England and Wales, the Legal Services Ombudsman was a statutory officer that investigated allegations about the improper, ineffective or inefficient way that complaints about lawyers are handled by their respective self-regulating professional bodies. The Ombudsman is appointed by, and is answerable to, the Lord Chancellor and Secretary of State for Justice. It has been abolished under the Legal Services Act 2007

The first Ombudsman was appointed to start work on 2 January 1991. During the first decade of operation, the office undertook 10,531 investigations:

- 9,456 complaints about solicitors;
- 1,036 complaints about barristers; and
- 39 complaints about licensed conveyancers.

Around 60% of the firms of solicitors in England and Wales and around 8% of practising barristers were subject of a complaint to the Ombudsman in that time.

== Powers ==
The Ombudsman could:

- Recommend that the professional body re-investigate a complaint;
- Order the re-investigation;
- Formally criticise the professional body;
- Award compensation for distress or inconvenience.

There was also a power to re-investigate the original complaint but this is only used in exceptional circumstances.

== Reform ==
With the passing of The Legal Services Act 2007 the Office of the Legal Services Ombudsman was abolished. It has been replaced by the Office for Legal Complaints. This body goes by the public name Legal Ombudsman.
