= Legal Services Board =

Legal regulator in England and Wales

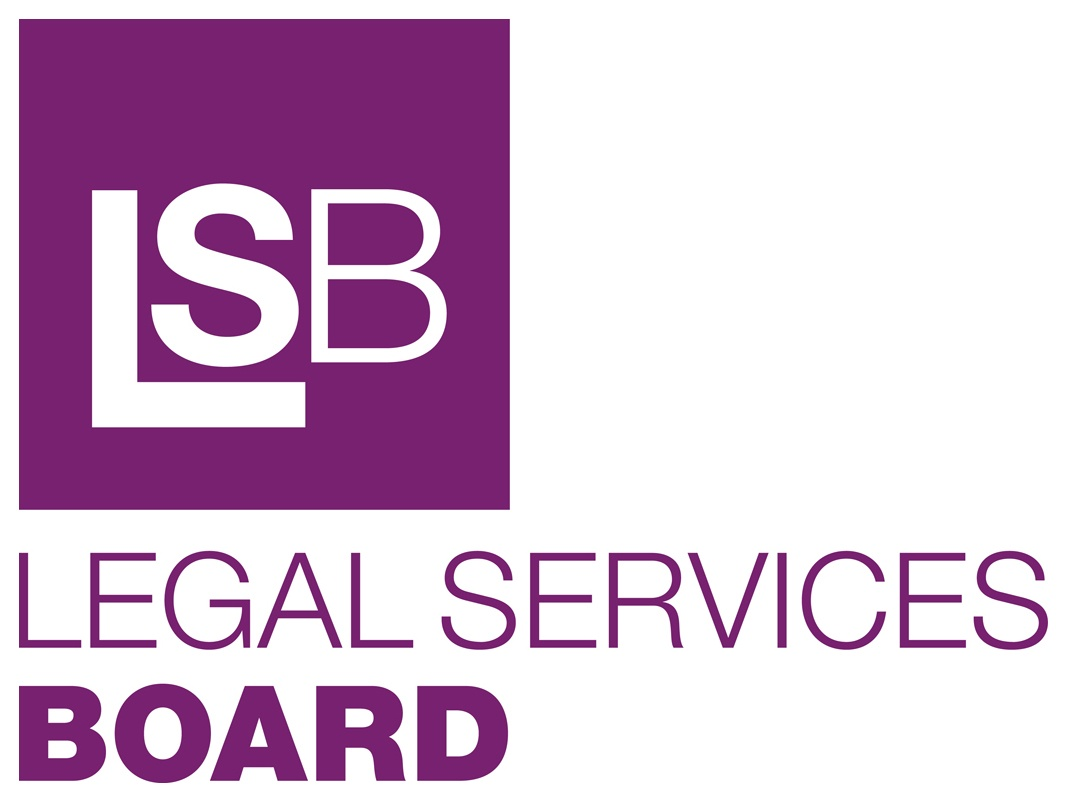
- Formation: 2007
- Legal status: Non-departmental public body
- Headquarters: Stratford, London
- Region served: England and Wales
- Chair: Monisha Shah
- Chief Executive: Richard Orpin
- Budget: £5,271,000 (2024/25 financial year)
- Website: www.legalservicesboard.org.uk

The Legal Services Board is an independent body responsible for overseeing the regulation of lawyers in England and Wales. It is a non-departmental public body sponsored by the Ministry of Justice, created through the Legal Services Act 2007 (LSA 2007).

The Legal Services Board is politically and financially independent of the government. Costs are covered entirely by a levy on the approved regulators of the legal professions. Its overriding mandate is to ensure that regulation in the legal services sector is carried out in the public interest and that the interests of consumers are placed at the heart of the system.

The Board came into being on 1 January 2009 and became fully operational on 1 January 2010.

== Role and function ==
The Legal Services Board is an oversight regulator, and sits at the top of the regulatory system for legal services in England and Wales. It provides regulatory oversight of the eight ‘’approved regulators’’ named in the Legal Services Act of 2007 (LSA 2007), and two additional regulators added since the act gained Royal Assent.

The Act outlines the general functions of the Board, which include: a duty to promote the regulatory objectives (and act in a way which it considers most appropriate for the purpose of meeting those objectives); to assist the regulators in the maintenance and development of standards of regulation, education and training of authorised persons; to have regard to good corporate governance practice in its affairs; and to prepare an annual report detailing the discharge of its functions in the previous financial year and its performance in line with the regulatory objectives.

It also oversees the Office for Legal Complaints (the body responsible for administering the Legal Ombudsman scheme), and makes recommendations to amend the list of reserved legal activitSupervision ies.

Regulation of the legal profession is the responsibility of the approved regulators (ARs). The LSB is responsible for overseeing the approved regulators and to ensure that regulation is conducted in adherence to the regulatory objectives, which it does through assessment against a regulatory performance framework. The LSB is responsible for ensuring that the approved regulators’ representative and regulatory functions are sufficiently independent from one another.

It does this by establishing Internal Governance Rules (IGR), which dictate how regulators’ independent regulatory arms are kept independent.

When regulators make changes to the rules governing those they regulate, they are required to submit an application to the LSB. The board then assesses these changes against a set of criteria on which applications can be refused, laid down in the Act.

The following list is a breakdown of the different legal professions, along with the approved regulator for that profession and its independent regulatory arm.

The approved regulators are:

Profession	Representative body	Regulatory body
Solicitors	Law Society of England and Wales	Solicitors Regulation Authority
Barristers	General Council of the Bar	Bar Standards Board
Legal Executives	Chartered Institute of Legal Executives (CILEx)	CILEx Regulation
Licensed Conveyancers		Council for Licensed Conveyancers
Licensed Conveyancers		Authorised Conveyancing Practitioners Board
Patent Attorneys	Chartered Institute of Patent Attorneys	Intellectual Property Regulation Board
Trademark Attorneys	Chartered Institute of Trade Mark Attorneys	Intellectual Property Regulation Board
Costs Lawyers	Association of Costs Lawyers	Costs Lawyer Standards Board
Notaries	Notaries Society	Master of the Faculties
Chartered Accountants	Institute of Chartered Accountants in England and Wales (ICAEW)	ICAEW Probate Committee

The LSB has the power to recommend to the Lord Chancellor that they approve further approved regulators. This means that new bodies can apply to the LSB to become front-line regulators of parts of the legal profession. As a result of the LSA 2007 coming into force, all changes to these bodies' internal professional regulatory arrangements must be approved by the LSB.[10]:s.20/ Sch.3, Pt.3

Under Section 51 to 54, the LSB has a duty to regulate practising fees, resolve regulatory conflicts and work with the Competition and Markets Authority and Lord Chancellor on competition issues.

=== Regulatory Objectives ===
It has a duty to promote nine regulatory objectives defined under the Act, a duty it shares with the approved regulators:

- Protecting and promoting the public interest;
- Supporting the constitutional principle of the rule of law;
- Improving access to justice;
- Protecting and promoting the interests of consumers of legal services;
- Promoting competition in the provision of legal services;
- Encouraging an independent, strong, diverse and effective legal profession;
- Increasing public understanding of the citizens' legal rights and duties;
- Promoting and maintaining adherence to the professional principles;
- Promoting the prevention and detection of economic crime.

The professional principles are:

- Authorized persons should act with independence and integrity;
- Authorized persons should maintain proper standards of work;
- Authorized persons should act in the best interests of their clients;
- Persons who exercise their rights before any court, a right of audience, or conduct litigation in relation to proceedings in any court by virtue of being authorized persons, should comply with their duty to the court to act with independence in the interests of justice;
- Affairs of clients should be kept confidential.

=== Powers and Enforcement ===
If the approved regulators fail to uphold the regulatory objectives, or if they fail to comply with the 2007 Act, the LSB can:

- Under Sections 32 to 34: issue directions to the regulator to correct the deficiency;
- Under Sections 35 to 36: publish a public censure;
- Under Sections 37 to 40: impose a financial penalty;
- Under Sections 41 to 44: make an intervention direction whereby the regulatory function is performed by a person nominated by the Board; and
- Under Sections 45 to 48: recommend that Lord Chancellor cancel the regulator's approval.

Under Section 51 to 54, the LSB has a duty to regulate practising fees, resolve regulatory conflicts and work with the Competition and Markets Authority and Lord Chancellor on competition issues.

== Relationship with the Ministry of Justice ==
The LSB a non-departmental government body, sponsored by the Ministry of Justice, but independent in its operations and decision making. Its staff are not civil servants, but public servants. The LSB receives no public funds, and is instead funded by a levy on the profession.

A framework document codifies the relationship between the two organisations.

== Criticism ==
In 2022, Mark Fenhalls KC, Chair of the Bar Council in 2022, criticised the LSB for overreaching its function under the Legal Services Act 2007, saying "does not attempt to act as a regulator of all legal services, nor of the entire legal services sector, because parliament has not given it that role". Fenhalls asked the Ministry of Justice to undertake a review of the LSB. Nick Vineall KC, Chair of the Bar Council in 2023 repeated this call, saying that there was nothing in the previous review in 2017 that it ought to be pursuing an overarching strategy for the entire legal services sector.

The Bar Council also criticised the LSB's call for evidence on the role of lawyers in ensuring that non-disclosure agreements were not misused, stating that their use was a matter for parliament, not lawyers.

== Scrutiny by the Justice Select Committee ==
The LSB is subject to review and scrutiny by the Justice Select Committee. The committee’s role is to scrutinise the policy, administration, and spending of the Ministry of Justice (MoJ). As a non-departmental public body which is sponsored by the MoJ, the LSB falls under the Justice Committee’s remit.

The LSB was invited to give oral evidence on 19 March 2013.

In June 2016, the LSB voluntarily submitted written evidence to the committee after it had heard from The Law Society, Solicitors Regulation Authority, Bar Council and Bar Standards Board in a public hearing on regulatory independence, which the LSB attended but was not invited to contribute to.

In November 2016, the LSB also submitted written evidence to the committee in relation to the impact of Brexit on legal services.

In October 2020, the LSB submitted written evidence to the committee's inquiry into the future of legal aid.

In 2020, the LSB also communicated with the committee regarding the Solicitors Qualifying Examination.

On 22 November 2023, the committee opened a non-inquiry session on the Regulation of the legal professions. The LSB, along with others, submitted written evidence. The LSB provided oral evidence to the committee on 5 December 2023. The non-inquiry resulted in a letter from the Chair of the committee to the Lord Chancellor on 22 March 2024, setting out the committee's recommendations. The Lord Chancellor replied on 8 May 2024.

== Board and executive team ==
The details of the current Chair of the Board and Board Members are available on the LSB's website.

The details of the LSB's current Chief Executive and executive team are available on the LSB's website.

The Chair of the Board receives a non-pensionable remuneration of £63,000 per annum for 70 days work.

Board member positions carry a non-pensionable remuneration of £15,000 per annum for at least 30 days work.

== Legal Services Consumer Panel ==
On 11 November 2009, the LSB launched the Legal Services Consumer Panel. The Panel operates independently of the LSB and represents the interests of both individual and business consumers in the LSB’s work to oversee the regulation of lawyers. The establishment of the Panel was a statutory requirement of the Legal Services Act of 2007. Members of the Panel are appointed by the LSB with the approval of Lord Chancellor. The Panel examines issues of importance to legal services consumers, advises the LSB in its work overseeing the frontline regulators and publishes this advice. Should the LSB fail to agree with such advice, it is required to publish a written statement outlining its reasons.
