= Matthew Weait =

Professor of Law and Society at Oxford

Matthew Weait (born 24 August 1963) is director of the Oxford University Department for Continuing Education, fellow of Harris Manchester College and professor of law and society at the University of Oxford.

== Biography ==
Weait studied law and criminology at Gonville and Caius College, University of Cambridge (1982–86) and completed his doctoral research at the Centre for Socio-Legal Studies, University of Oxford (1995). He was called to the Bar of England and Wales in 1999. In 2009 he was awarded an MA in creative writing from Birkbeck College. He is a Fellow of the Academy of Social Sciences, Fellow of the Royal Society for Public Health and a Bencher of The Honourable Society of the Middle Temple.

Weait was lecturer at Birkbeck College (1992–1999), the Open University (2000–2004) and Keele University (2004–07). He was appointed senior lecturer in law and legal studies at Birkbeck in 2007 and was promoted to reader in 2009. He was professor of law and policy at Birkbeck, and pro-vice-master (academic and community partnerships) from 2011 to 2015. From 2020 to 2022 he was deputy vice-chancellor at the University of Hertfordshire. Between 2002 and 2003 he was parliamentary research officer to Lord Lester of Herne Hill at the Odysseus Trust.

Weait's research centres on the impact of law on people living with HIV and AIDS, and he has published in this area. His monograph Intimacy and Responsibility: the Criminalisation of HIV Transmission was published in 2007. He was a member of the Technical Advisory Group for the Global Commission on HIV and the Law and the Joint Academic Stage Board of the Solicitors Regulation Authority and the Bar Standards Board. Weait's short stories have been published in the Fish Anthology and the Institute Review, and his story "the days he had seen" was shortlisted for the 2009 Bridport Prize.
