= Certificate of legal aid costs =

A certificate of legal aid costs is a British "certificate of costs allowed following taxation by a judicial or taxing officer." It actually has nothing to do with legal aid.

It is similar to a bill of costs used in Italy, and elsewhere.

== See also ==
- Bill of costs
- Judgment (law)
- Taxation of costs
