= Costs in English law =

Procedural rules regarding costs in litigation applied in England and Wales

In English civil litigation, costs are the lawyers' fees and disbursements of the parties.

In the absence of any order or directive regarding costs, each party is liable to pay their own solicitors' costs and disbursements such as a barrister's fees; in case of dispute, the court has jurisdiction to assess and determine the proper amount. In legal aid cases, a similar assessment will determine the costs which the solicitors will be paid from the Legal Aid Fund.

In most courts and tribunals, generally after a final judgment has been given, and possibly after any interim application, the judge has the power to order any party (and in exceptional cases even a third party, or any of the lawyers personally) to pay some or all of other parties' costs. The law of costs defines how such allocation is to take place. Even when a successful party obtains an order for costs against an opponent, it is usual that he may nevertheless still have to pay his solicitors a balance between the costs recoverable from the opponent and the total chargeable by his solicitor; and if the loser is unable to pay, then the order for costs may be worthless, and the successful party will remain fully liable to their own solicitors.

== General principle ==
The general principle of costs in England and Wales is that the successful party has the costs they have incurred in litigation paid by the unsuccessful party. The Civil Procedure Rules describe this as costs following the event. This is typical across most common law jurisdictions, with the notable exception of the United States where each side pays their own costs. There are a number of exceptions to the general principle of costs following the event, and procedural rules which shift the incentives of parties in litigation towards settling cases.

=== Comparison with other countries ===
The law of costs is often known as the English rule and is contrasted with the American rule—the general rule in the United States that legal fees may be sought only if the parties agree by contract before the litigation, or if some special act or statute allows the successful party to seek such fees. Federal district court and Court of Appeals judges award costs to the prevailing party under Federal Rules of Civil Procedure.

The English rule has been criticised; critics point out that it potentially hinders access to justice by increasing the risks of litigation—both by setting up the risk of having to pay both parties' full costs in the event of losing, and by creating incentives for parties to sink increasing resources into their cases to win the action and avoid paying fees, thereby increasing the overall cost-risk of litigation.

A Canadian example is Sonnenberg Inc. v Stewart, Smith (1986), an Alberta decision clarifying the distinction between ordinary cost awards and indemnity (“solicitor-client”) costs, and setting out when enhanced costs orders are appropriate.

The German costs rule, which allows for fixed recoverable costs, avoids this unfortunate consequence of full-fees recovery.

Hong Kong generally follows the English Rule.

== Application of the rule ==
In the small fraction of cases that do not settle and instead proceed to a judgment, generally costs "follow the event" so that the successful party is entitled to seek an order that the unsuccessful party pay his or her costs. Should a case settle, then the parties can seek to agree costs, with the general rule that the losing party pays costs. This is the general rule as set out in CPR Part 44 – General Rules About Costs

=== Costs orders ===
The order that a judge gives as to costs determines who will be the paying and who the receiving party. The amount of costs remains to be determined by assessment if not agreed. Common costs orders, other than on the Small Claims Track, include the following:

Order	Effect
Costs (in any event)	Costs to receiving party no matter what happens subsequently
Costs in the case/application	Costs of interim proceedings are to be awarded according to the outcome of the case
Costs reserved	Costs of the specific issue in question to be decided at the end of trial (costs in the case if no other order made then)
Costs thrown-away	Costs of the applicant in, for example, a successful application to set aside an order improperly obtained
Costs of and caused by	Costs of other parties when a party, for example, amends a case – costs of attending the application hearing and own consequential amendments
Costs here and below	Includes costs in inferior courts (but appeal from Divisional Court cannot award costs below Divisional Court)
No order as to costs / Each party to pay his own costs	Parties bear their own costs relating to that issue

==== Interim costs ====
As a general rule, after judgment has been handed down, the court "will" order one party to make an advance payment towards the other side's costs. This will be done even before the costs claim has been finalised.

The amount that will be ordered is based upon the parties' disclosed costs estimates, and will take into account the percentage of costs that have been ordered to be paid; any order for Indemnity Basis costs, if relevant, and any costs that are due to the paying party.

=== Wasted costs ===
These are defined as "costs incurred by a party—

(a) as a result of any improper, unreasonable or negligent act or omission on the part of any legal or other representative or any employee of such a representative; or

(b) which, in the light of any such act or omission occurring after they were incurred, the court considers it is unreasonable to expect that party to pay"

These costs will include the situation in which a party has incurred unnecessarily due to the other side's conduct. For example, if a court hearing is postponed due to one party not turning up at court. As a result, the other party had to pay a brief fee for a barrister, for a hearing that ultimately did not take place. Other instances includes failure to follow practice directions, and in some cases, acting in an unnecessarily belligerent manner.

In Hong Kong (and many other common law jurisdictions), during the pre-Civil Justice Reforms era, 'macho', 'tough' and 'aggressive' litigators may be prized by lay-clients. However, with the implementation of the Civil Justice Reforms (CJR), 'macho', 'tough' and 'aggressive' litigators may end up causing more harm to their clients. Willingness to reconcile and compromise is, therefore, the new king in Hong Kong's new litigation landscape where the laws requires legal practitioners to advice their clients the importance of settlement negotiations. This was illustrated by the Patrick Wang Ho Yin cost order.

=== Security for costs ===
Security for costs is a common law legal concept of application only in costs jurisdictions, and is an order sought from a court in litigation. These are now governed by Part 25 of the Civil Procedure Rules.

The general rule in costs jurisdiction is that "costs follow the event". In other words, the loser in legal proceedings must pay the legal costs of the successful party. Where a defendant has a reasonable apprehension that its legal costs will not be paid for by the claimant if the defendant is successful, the defendant can apply to the court for an order that the claimant provide security for costs. Furthermore, the amount that is ordered by the judge is in direct correlation to the strength or weakness of the claimant's case brought herewith. The weaker the probability of the claimant prevailing, the higher the security order.

Typically a claimant will be outside the jurisdiction of the court: the law of security for costs recognises that orders of the court relating to payment of a party's legal costs can be very difficult to enforce in non-common law jurisdictions, and so will order security to be provided. Security can also be ordered where a claimant is insolvent, or prone to vexatious litigation.

Security is usually provided in the form of a bank cheque paid into the court, or held in a trust account operated jointly by both the claimant's and defendant's lawyers. If the defendant is successful, the money can be applied against the costs order. If the claimant is successful, the security is returned to the claimant.

=== What can be claimed? ===
Recoverable costs are limited to:

- Fees and charges of the solicitor (attorney), which may be hourly, daily or an agreed sum;
- Disbursements, including barristers'/counsels' fees;
- Witness allowances (conduct money), including fees paid to expert witnesses;
- Some professional fees for non-witnesses;
- VAT (where chargeable);
- Lawyers' "success fees" allowable by the court under a valid conditional fee agreement (CFA); and
- After-the-event insurance premium.

=== The indemnity principle ===
In English costs law the indemnity principle is the concept that a receiving party is unable to recover more than the costs for which they are liable to pay themselves, in costs of the litigation. It is unrelated the indemnity basis, being one of the bases on which the court may award costs (below).

The principle was originally explained in Harold v Smith (1860) 5 Hurlestone & Norman 381:

“Costs as between party and party are given by the law as an indemnity to the person entitled to: they are not imposed as a punishment on the party who pays them, nor given as a bonus to the party who receives them.”

In other words, a recovery of costs is viewed not as a reward or bonus, but as an award of indemnity to the party that has incurred the costs.

The 'limit' as to what a receiving party may recover is determined by what they are liable to pay, as opposed to what they may have actually paid in legal fees. As long as there is liability for the receiving party to pay some amount (for example, pursuant to a retainer with their solicitor), a receiving party can seek to recover costs up to such amount—it is irrelevant whether the liability is enforced.

==== Exceptions ====
The principle causes anomalies for pro bono representation where, because the lawyers have agreed to represent the party for no cost, they cannot subsequently ask the court for a costs award when they win. However, since 2008 s. 194 Legal Services Act 2007 allows the court to order a party who loses against pro bono representation to make an appropriate charitable donation in lieu of costs.

There are also specific exceptions to the principle for:

- In-house lawyers;
- Conditional fee agreements;
- Legal aid; and
- Litigants in person.

=== Exceptions ===
The rule that "costs follow the event" is observed on the Multi- and Fast Tracks.

However, the judge has considerable discretion to apply or disapply these rules if the result would otherwise be unjust. The paying party can appeal against the costs order by the usual routes of appeal.

==== Small claims track ====
If a case is allocated to the Small Claims Track, only specific limited costs such as fixed court fees are usually awarded.

==== Fast-track trials ====
On the Fast Track, the actual costs of the trial, as opposed to preparatory work, are fixed.

==== Fixed costs and fees ====
There are also fixed costs for road traffic accident (RTA) claims that settle before they are issued; and in certain cases brought by HM Revenue & Customs.

In addition, where both the current CPR 48 and old CPR 45 apply, there are fixed success fees in personal injury claims arising from RTAs; injuries at work; and industrial disease claims. These range from 12.5% in RTAs to 100%, in each type of case, if a trial occurs.

==== Costs limits ====
In certain Fast-Track or Multi-Track cases, a successful party's costs claim will be limited.

These include cases that are conducted in the Patents County Court or in claims under the Aarhus Convention.

==== Formal offers to settle ====
The court will take account of the conduct of the parties and may vary the usual costs order in the event of misguided or dishonest behaviour. In particular, the claimant is expected to give the defendant an opportunity to settle, and the parties are expected to exchange essential information and details before starting a claim. The court will especially be aware of any formal offers to settle made under Part 36 of the Civil Procedure Rules. Such offers are withheld from the judge during the trial but, during assessment of costs, the judge will compare them with the final damages awarded.

Where a party has succeeded overall but lost on discrete issues, or where its conduct does not justify a full costs award, the court may take a percentage costs order, directing the paying party to pay only a specified proportion of the receiving party's costs rather than the whole. The appropriate percentage is a matter for the judge's broad discretion under CPR 44.2.

===== Acceptance of offers =====
If a Part 36 offer is accepted, or if the claimant discontinues, the unsuccessful party is usually liable for both parties' costs to that date.

===== Rejection of offers =====
If offers are rejected, and the case goes to trial, then one of the following situations can apply.

If the defendant rejected the claimant's Part 36 offer to settle, then:
- If the claimant is awarded a sum that is "at least as advantageous" as that offer, then the claimant is entitled to each of the following:

Indemnity Basis costs (defined in a separate section further below) from the date the offer expires;
Punitive interest, up to 10% above base rate, on the whole or part of any sum awarded, for some or all of the time at issue; and
An "additional amount" of up to £75,000 (only if the Part 36 offer dates from 1 April 2013).

- If there is a judgment for the claimant that is less than the offer, then the general rules apply: the claimant is entitled to standard-basis costs plus interest.
- If there is a judgment for the defendant that is less than the offer, then the general rules apply: the defendant is entitled to standard-basis costs plus interest.

If the Claimant rejected the defendant's offer to settle, then:
- If the Claimant failed 'to obtain a judgment that is more advantageous' than that offer at trial, then the defendant is entitled to, from the date that the offer expired:

Standard Basis costs;
Interest on the costs.

- If there is a judgment for the claimant that exceeds the offer, then the general rules apply: the claimant is entitled to Standard Basis costs plus interest.

The unsuccessful party is generally also liable for both parties' costs up to the date that the Part 36 offer expires, on the Standard Basis, plus interest.

===== Discontinued claims =====
If the claimant discontinues, they are usually liable for both parties' costs to the date of discontinuance, on the Standard Basis.

==== Qualified one-way costs-shifting ====
In personal injury or fatal accident cases since 1 April 2013, there is a further exception to the costs-shifting rules known as "Qualified One-Way Costs-Shifting".

If this applies then orders for costs against the claimant can normally only be enforced by a defendant if the total doesn't exceed the amount of damages and costs which a Defendant has to pay out.

However, it can be enforced in full without the court's permission if the claim was struck-out because:

(a) the claimant has disclosed no reasonable grounds for bringing the proceedings;
(b) the proceedings are an abuse of the court’s process; or
(c) the conduct of –

(i) the claimant; or
(ii) a person acting on the claimant’s behalf and with the claimant’s knowledge of such conduct,

is likely to obstruct the just disposal of the proceedings.

The court's permission to enforce in full is required if the claim was found at trial to be "fundamentally dishonest". If the claim was discontinued, the court can order a hearing to determine whether it was "fundamentally dishonest" to bring it.

==== Other situations ====
Other exceptions to the general rules include:

- Applications to extend time limits, usually paid by the applicant;
- Amendments to statements of case, usually paid by the amending party, including the costs of the other side's resulting amendments; and
- Failure to respond to a notice to admit where the receiving party will usually pay the costs of proving the facts alleged.

=== Who can claim costs? ===
As a general rule, the losing party pays the costs of the winning party, but the court can order otherwise.

==== In-house lawyers ====
The rule also covers in-house corporate legal teams that conduct litigation and have rights of audience. They can claim the remuneration and expenses of the lawyers involved at the rates that external solicitors could claim, even though their fees would be paid as part of the company's overheads.

==== Litigants in person ====
Litigants in person will be awarded a fixed hourly rate of £24 per hour, unless they can prove that they have incurred a financial loss in conducting the action. The Litigants in Person (Costs and Expenses) Act 1975 is the statutory basis for costs recovery by litigants in person.

Practitioners (when suing or sued) have sometimes been observed to abuse existing rules where they would purport to have had their own firm act for them (even though the arrangement is essentially the same as an act in person). The problem being of course is that they can essentially profit when conducting their own litigation. This has resulted in solicitor-litigants being observed to lack sincerity when negotiating for a settlement (hoping that the litigation will continue on for longer and thus resulting in more fees for themselves) as illustrated in the case of Patrick Wang Ho Yin. In that case, Mr. Justice Andrew Li observed

"...I agree that there was "some" evidence to suggest that P [Patrick Wang Ho Yin], in his capacity as the handling solicitor, might not have been very sincere or genuine in his attempts to negotiate for the settlement... I find, P, by issuing the Summons even before proper negotiations with D1 had taken place, had conducted the matter in an oppressive manner. For example, before the parties even concluded their first round of negotiations on some matters which could only be described as "a trivial" in late June 2017, P in his email dated 26 June 2017 to D1's former solicitors, stated that "our client’s sincerity for amicable solutions between the parties has already been exhausted ... we hereby reserve out client’s rights to apply for the direction of the court and commence civil proceedings for contempt of court, if any" (emphasis added)."

The costs awarded to a litigant in person cannot exceed two-thirds of what could be claimed by a professional lawyer.

== Assessment of costs ==
=== Reasonableness ===
All claims for costs must be "reasonably incurred" or "reasonable in amount". if costs are specified as being paid as part of a contract, they are presumed to be reasonable, unless the contract says otherwise. Reasonableness is assessed against "all the circumstances" and in particular the "seven pillars of wisdom":

- Conduct of the parties:
  - Before as well as during proceedings;
  - Efforts made to resolve the dispute;
- Value of the property at issue;
- Importance of the matter to the parties;
- Complexity, difficulty or novelty of the case;
- Skill, effort, specialised knowledge or responsibility required;
- Time spent on the case;
- Geographical location where the work was done.

=== Basis of costs assessment ===
There are two basic ways in which the court will assess a claim for costs: the Standard Basis and the Indemnity Basis. However, in each situation, the claim must be reasonable.

The manner in that they are assessed goes a long way in determining the overall percentage that will be allowed.

==== Standard Basis ====
Costs awarded on the Standard Basis must be "proportionate to the matters in issue". Any doubt as to the costs is resolved in favour of the paying party.

==== Indemnity Basis ====
Costs awarded on the Indemnity Basis need not be "proportionate". Any doubt as to the costs is resolved in favour of the receiving party.

As a whole, an award for costs on the Indemnity Basis is much more favourable to the receiving party than an award of the Standard Basis.

For example, in the case of Patrick Wang Ho Yin, Mr. Wang was ordered to pay $375,000 for a half-day hearing after the Court has found it reasonable to impose liability on an indemnity basis. In this case, the Court has found that Mr. Wang's belligerent conduct has caused the parties to have incurred costs of which could have been avoidable.

=== Proportionality ===
In considering whether or not a party's claim for costs is "proportionate", the court has to apply one of two different tests.

==== The old test ====
This applies where work is done before 1 April 2013, or to the whole of the costs in "cases commenced", i.e. if proceedings are issued, before 1 April 2013.

In these situations, the court should have regard to the seven pillars of wisdom. The court should adopt a two-stage approach:

1. Compare the total costs claimed against the total benefits gained by the successful party:
2. If the total costs are proportionate to the total benefits:

a) Perform an item by item test of reasonableness;

— if they are not proportionate:

b) Perform an item by item test of necessity.

==== The new test ====
If the work was done since 1 April 2013, and relates to a case that either does not involve court proceedings, or was issued since 1 April 2013, then a different test applies.

In these situations, the court will hold that costs "are proportionate if they bear a reasonable relationship to –

(a) the sums in issue in the proceedings;
(b) the value of any non-monetary relief in issue in the proceedings;
(c) the complexity of the litigation;
(d) any additional work generated by the conduct of the paying party; and
(e) any wider factors involved in the proceedings, such as reputation or public importance".

In addition, the "necessity" of the costs is not relevant.

=== Costs estimates ===
In cases issued before 1 April 2013, parties have to give estimates of their likely costs should the case reach a trial. They are used to give each side and the Court an idea of what the likely costs burden would be.

These are submitted at the allocation and listing stage, and at any time that the Court orders them.

A party that has costs awarded in their favour will not be limited to their estimate, but if the costs claimed exceed the estimate by 20% they will need to provide reasons. If the paying party has shown that they relied on the estimated, the Court can use the estimate as evidence that the claim is disproportionate.

=== Costs Budgets (Precedent H) ===
If a case is issued since 1 April 2013, and is allocated to the Multi-track, the parties can be forced to submit a budget for their costs, which the court can then approve. They do not apply to proceedings in the Admiralty; Chancery Division; or Commercial Court; or to cases in the Mercantile Court or Technology & Construction Court where damages exceed £10 million.

Further fixed costs reforms enacted on 1 October 2023 meant that generally only cases pleaded in excess of £100,000 would be allocated to the Multi Track, thereby narrowing the number of cases requiring Costs Budgets to be prepared on. In relation to personal injury (PI) claims, the new allocation rules only effect matters whereby the index accident has happened on or after 1 October 2023, and for non-PI matters, when proceedings are issued on or after 1 October 2023.

Further pilot reforms were introduced from April 2025, with the introduction of the Precedent Z, relating to a simplified costs budgeting process and more streamlined Costs Budget form.

==== Impact and effect ====
The rules relating to costs budgets are more stringent than those relating to estimates.

All parties must file a budget, unless they are a litigant in person. If a party does not file a budget, it "will be treated" as only budgeting for the costs of any appropriate court fees. The costs of preparing a budget can be claimed, up to a maximum of £1,000 or 1% of the budget's total, whichever is greater.

If the Court approves or the parties agree a Costs Budget a Costs Management Order is usually made. Where the parties become aware that their costs are likely to exceed the amount of the Costs Management Order they should apply to the court to vary where "significant developments" warrant that application.

Should a party exceed its budget, their costs will be limited to their last approved budget on assessment unless there is a "good reason". It has been held that "good reasons" include the fact that the costs were otherwise "reasonable and proportionate"; and where there was a simple "tick-box" error. Costs exceeding the budget have been disallowed where a party has not applied to have its budget increased during the proceedings.

If the court has not been able to approve a party's budget, for example, due to the case settling before it was able to do so, then different rules apply. However, these rules are similar to those relating to estimates: if a party's costs claim exceeds its budget by 20%, then the difference must be explained. The paying party must also show how they have relied on the estimate. If the court agrees with the paying party, it can limit the costs to the budget; and if it disagrees with the receiving party it can use the difference as evidence the costs are "unreasonable or disproportionate".

However, should a party ultimately be awarded costs on the Indemnity Basis, then the budget is not relevant in relation to those costs.

The rules relating to costs budgets will be amended as of 1 October 2020 so that, in addition to the test of significant developments, the court may vary the budget if one party is acting oppressively by causing the other party to incur costs. Those same changes introduce a new form Precedent T which must be served and filed to explain the significant developments in the case.

=== Inter partes costs ===
Where a party is awarded costs against another they are known as inter partes costs or between party costs.

Such costs are usually assessed on the standard basis. The successful party may not be awarded the entirety of their legal costs, as the costs incurred will be assessed by an officer of the court. This can be done in one of two ways.

==== Summary assessment ====
The simplified procedure is known as summary assessment under which the court will consider a schedule of the costs incurred which will usually be no more than two pages long and is often only a single page. This is the usual method on the Fast Track, for hearings lasting no longer than a single day, for certain appeal hearings and for the costs of the paying party in detailed assessment hearings.

However, summary assessment is not permitted for claims:

- On behalf of children or mental patients; or
- Funded by the Legal Services Commission;

— or where:

- Paying party can raise substantial grounds; or
- Costs have been agreed by the parties.

==== Detailed assessment ====
For more complex cases a process, formerly called a taxation of costs, now known as detailed assessment, is used. It is unrelated to "tax" in the sense of a method of raising government revenue. The successful party must file with the court (unless the other party fails to respond to the notice of assessment) a detailed breakdown of the costs and disbursements incurred, known as a bill of costs which sets out the successful party's claim. The bill is usually prepared by a law costs draftsman, whose skill is often as essential to the successful recovery of costs as the skill of a solicitor or barrister is essential to success on the principal issues of the litigation. An officer of the court, costs judge or district judge will then assess the reasonableness of the costs (unless the potential paying party failed to respond to the notice of assessment) with reference to a statutory schedule of limits of entitlements of costs, together with legal precedents, unless the costs can be agreed between the parties. The level of reduction can mean that the bill is reduced in some instances substantially, but in most cases at least 80% of the costs originally sought will be allowed. A court order for costs is enforceable as a debt against the unsuccessful party.

The detailed assessment process itself involved the Receiving Party serving the itemised Bill of Costs on the Paying Party, together with a Notice of Commencement (also known as an N252). Within 21 days of service (unless an extension is agreed), the Paying Party will need to submit their written legal submissions by way of Points of Dispute, to which the Receiving Party can respond with Points of Reply. Negotiations can take place at any time during the detailed assessment process however, if agreement cannot be reached, then the Receiving Party will need to apply for assessment (either provisional on the papers, or an attended oral hearing) for the Court to determine the costs payable.

Either party can appeal against a detailed assessment, to a costs judge or district judge of the High Court if the assessment was made by a court officer, or by the usual routes of appeal if the assessment was made by a judge.

===== Provisional assessment =====
If a bill of costs of under £75,000 is sent for a detailed assessment since 1 April 2013, it will at first be assessed via provisional assessment procedure. (unless the potential paying party failed to respond to the notice of assessment).

This involves an assessment by the Judge on paper, without the parties being present, and the costs of it are limited to £1,500.

If either party disagrees with the outcome they can apply for an oral hearing, but unless they beat the provisional figure by 20%, they will be liable for the costs of the hearing.

=== Solicitor/own client costs ===
The other type of costs, aside from inter partes costs, is called solicitor-client costs and are usually assessed on the indemnity basis. However, costs are presumed to be reasonably incurred and reasonable in amount if the client gave their express or implied approval, but are presumed to be unreasonably incurred if the client was not told they would be recovered from the other side and if they are unusual.

Unless instructed under a damages-based agreement, lawyers in England and Wales are not permitted to work for a share of damages awarded as this would amount to champerty. A client who is unhappy with a lawyer's invoice for services can apply to the court for an order or invoke a statutory procedure whereby the costs are assessed for their reasonableness by an officer of the court, for example a judge. This is also a detailed assessment. If the client does not pay the lawyer, the lawyer has a cause of action if the client does not elect to arbitrate the bill.

There is a statutory time limit on applying for such a procedure, of a year. The frequent result is that the lawyer's invoice is decreased. If the bill is reduced by one fifth or more the solicitor will pay for the process of assessment, but otherwise the client will pay. The client can alternatively apply to the Law Society for a remuneration certificate in respect of costs arising from other than litigation.

== Specific types of funding ==
Any case can be funded by a standard retainer agreement, i.e. where the solicitor agrees to act and the client pays as the case carries on.

There are also other ways in which a case can be funded, as long as certain requirements are met.

=== Conditional fee agreements (CFAs) ===
These are commonly referred to as "no win, no fee" agreements. Under this type of agreement, the solicitor and/or barrister agrees not to charge the client unless the case succeeds.

If the client does win their case, then the solicitor and/or barrister is entitled to claim a percentage bonus (a "success fee") on top of their usual fees.

To be valid, the CFA agreement must comply with certain requirements. All CFAs must:

- Be in writing
- Not relate to proceedings that cannot be the subject of an enforceable conditional fee agreement
- Comply with any requirements prescribed by the Lord Chancellor

However, what can be claimed under it, and other additional requirements that may have to be met for the CFA to be valid, depend upon the date of the CFA.

==== CFAs dated from 1 April 2000 to 31 October 2005 ====
If the CFA was entered into between these dates, the Conditional Fee Agreements Regulations 2000 must also be complied with.

The main requirement is that before entering into the CFA the solicitor must advise the client, amongst other things, as to its effect; of alternative funding methods; and whether he has any interest in nay particular insurance policy.

If these regulations are not complied with, the CFA will not be valid.

If they are complied with, it will be valid and a success fee can be claimed from the other side, as long as they are informed of its existence.

==== CFAs dated from 1 November 2005 to 31 March 2013 ====
Only the requirements of s. 58 Courts and Legal Services Act 1990 need to be complied with.

If so, then it will be valid and a success fee can be claimed from the other side, as long as they are informed of its existence.

==== CFAs dated from 1 April 2013 ====
If a CFA is entered into from this date then, unless the claim is for defamation; breach of privacy; diffuse mesothelioma, or is in a set of insolvency proceedings, a success fee cannot be claimed from the other side.

It can still be claimed from the client, but in personal injury claims is subject to a 25% limit of the client's damages.

The solicitors' or barrister's normal fees can still be claimed from the other side.

=== Collective conditional fee agreements (CCFAs) ===
A CCFA is CFA that covers numerous people, for example, members of a trade union, in relation to different claims, which could occur at different times.

The rules relating to CFAs generally apply to CCFAs, but, in relation to success fees, the following rules apply to CCFAs:

If the CCFA dates from 1 April 2013, then a success fee cannot be recovered from the other side;
If the CCFA pre-dates 1 April 2013, then a success fee can only be recovered from the other side if work was done before 1 April 2013

=== Insurance policies ===
Most litigants will have the benefit of some form of insurance will cover both their legal costs, and those of the other side.

However, both types will be subject to an upper limit on the amount of costs covered.

==== Before-the-event (BTE) policies ====
This kind of insurance policy before-the-event (BTE) against paying the other party's legal costs as part of their domestic or automobile insurance policies (although many are unaware of it).

The premium for this type of policy cannot be claimed from the other side.

==== After-the-event (ATE) policies ====
If a litigation does not have a BTE policy, they can purchase after-the-event (ATE) legal expenses insurance at the start of litigation.

If the policy was taken out before 1 April 2013, the premium can be claimed from the other side as part of a normal claim for costs.

However, if it was taken out since 1 April 2013, it can only be recovered if it was taken out to cover the costs of an expert's report in a claim for clinical negligence.

=== Damages-based agreements (DBAs) ===
These are a type of contingency fee, i.e. the solicitor and barrister agree to take a percentage of the client's damages if the claim succeeds.

They generally have to comply with the Damages-Based Agreements Regulations 2013, and there is a maximum percentage that can be claimed varies depending on the type of claim and the level of court that the DBA relates to. The solicitors' disbursements can also be claimed.

==== Employment claims ====
If a DBA pre-dates 1 April 2013, then the Damages-Based Agreements Regulations 2010 apply. If not, then the 2013 Regulations apply.

However, there is no significant difference between the two sets, because in both situations, the solicitors and barristers' fees are limited to 35% of the client's damages.

In addition, before entering into the DBA, the client must be given information relating to funding, mediation, and when the fee becomes payable.

==== Non-employment claims ====
Different rules apply to non-employment cases funded by a DBA: specifically, the client does not have to be provided the information needed in employment cases, and the percentage fee varies.

===== First-instance cases =====
If the DBA is entered into in a personal injury claim, then up to 25% of the client's damages plus Counsel's fees can be claimed.

In other cases, up to 50% of the client's damages, including Counsel's fees can be claimed.

===== Appeals =====
If the DBA relates to an appeal, then up to 100% of the client's damages can be charged as the fee.

== Costs against other parties ==
=== Costs in third-party claims ===
Sometimes a defendant brings a claim, for a contribution or an indemnity towards damages, against a third party. For example, a diner claims against a restaurant for a dose of food poisoning and the restaurant claims against their supplier of shellfish. Again, "costs follow the event". If the restaurant successfully defends the claim, they pay the supplier's costs and recover the same amount from the unsuccessful claimant. This can cause injustice when the unsuccessful claimant is insolvent and the successful defendant is still liable for third-party costs. The courts will only rarely allow a "cut through" of the third-party's costs to the claimant but the interests of justice prevail.

=== Costs against non-parties ===
The courts have a wide discretion in awarding costs, and non-parties are not immune, unless they are a BTE insurer.

This is particularly relevant in cases of champerty and maintenance.

== Criminal proceedings ==
If a defendant is found to be innocent of a crime, then they are also entitled to claim their incurred legal costs, but the costs are payable out of money raised through taxes.

A bill of costs is submitted in the normal way, but the costs are assessed by the National Taxing Team in a manner similar to a claim for costs in a civil case.

Costs assessed in this way do not require a formal detailed assessment, but any amount awarded can be appealed in the usual way.

If a prosecution started before October 2012, then the costs will be assessed with no general restrictions on what can be claimed.

If a prosecution has started since 1 October 2012, then the amount that can be claimed is much lower. Effectively, the costs are limited to legal aid rates.

== See also ==
- Court costs
- Third-party beneficiary

== Bibliography ==
- Cook, MJ (2012). Cook on Costs 2012. London: LexisNexis Butterworths. ISBN 978-1-4057-5547-4.
- Friston, M (2012). Civil Costs: Law and Practice (2nd ed.). Bristol: Jordans. ISBN 978-1-84661-312-8.
- Jackson, Lord Justice, ed. (2013). Civil Procedure. Thomson Reuters (Professional) UK Ltd. ISBN 9780414027510.
- O'Hare, J; Browne, K (2005). Civil Litigation (12th ed.). London: Thomson. ISBN 0-421-90690-1.
