= Legal Complaints Service =

In England and Wales, the Legal Complaints Service was a body that formally investigated complaints about solicitors, which was superseded by the Legal Ombudsman in 2010.

== Background ==
Solicitors in England and Wales are both represented and regulated by the Law Society and, before 2007, the society investigated complaints about its members through its Legal Complaints Service (LCS). However, in September 2003, the Lord Chancellor Lord Falconer, criticised the society, saying:

Unfortunately in spite of all efforts, complaints handling is still not efficient and effective.

As a result, in February 2004 the Lord Chancellor exercised his powers under the Access to Justice Act 1999 to appoint a Legal Services Complaints Commissioner to regulate the society. In response to the commissioner's criticisms, in 2005, the Law Society divided its functions among the society, the Solicitors Regulation Authority and the Legal Complaints Service but by May 2006, the society's efforts to remedy its own deficiencies were still giving concern to the commissioner. As a result, a penalty of £220,000 was levied. The commissioner subsequently recognised that progress was being made and on 22 February 2007, the service came into being. In April 2007, the commissioner advised the society that their Complaints Handling Plan adequately addressed the concerns. However, in April 2008, the commissioner reported that "Results show that despite some improvements in all target areas set, there are still failures ... to consistently apply their policies, processes and customer standards." On 3 June 2008, the commissioner fined the Law Society £275,000 over the inadequacy of its complaints handling plan for the forthcoming year.

== The Service ==
The Service was a complaints-handling body, quasi-independent of the Society. It was part of the Law Society, but operated independently. The services offered to consumers were confidential and free at the point of use, the profession having rejected the idea of charging a flat fee as do some other professional complaints services, for example, that of architects. Where a complaint was upheld the firm complained of may have been required to make a contribution to the costs incurred by the Service in dealing with the complaint. Each case was said to have been looked at impartially, the Service working to find a solution acceptable to everyone concerned, including the lawyer.

The Service's Chief Executive, Deborah Evans, said:

The organisation’s vision, an independent, responsive, Legal Complaints Service of quality, mirrors our purpose which is to resolve problems such as a solicitor not having done what they have been instructed to, causing unreasonable delay or failing to keep their client informed about what is going on.

The Service and Chief Executive are both steered by the Board for the Legal Complaints Service, chaired by Shamit Saggar.

== Further criticism and reform ==
Chief Executive Evans was criticised as actively-seeking complaints about solicitors and as showing an excess of zeal in making work for her organisation in a bid to attract more funding.

Complaints handling was further criticised in Sir David Clementi's 2004 report into regulation of legal services.

When the Legal Services Act 2007 fully came into force, the Legal Services Complaints Commissioner was abolished and replaced with an Office for Legal Complaints which supervises the complaints-handling of solicitors, barristers and other legal professionals.

== Bibliography ==
- Legal Services Complaints Commissioner (2005). "Annual Report 2004-2005" (PDF). Law in Order: your right to expect better. London: The Stationery Office. Archived from the original (PDF) on 2009-06-07. "HC 166"
- Legal Services Complaints Commissioner (2006). "Annual Report 2005-2006" (PDF). Actions not words: consumers matter. London: The Stationery Office. Archived from the original (PDF) on 2008-07-28. "HC 1225"
- Legal Services Complaints Commissioner (2007). "Annual Report 2006-2007" (PDF). Cycle of change. London: The Stationery Office. Archived from the original (PDF) on 2010-02-10. "HC 676"
- Legal Services Complaints Commissioner (2008). "Annual Report 2007-2008". A work in progress. London: The Stationery Office. Archived from the original on 2008-12-06. "HC 840"
