= Peace of Constantinople (1879) =

1879 treaty superseding the Treaty of San Stefano

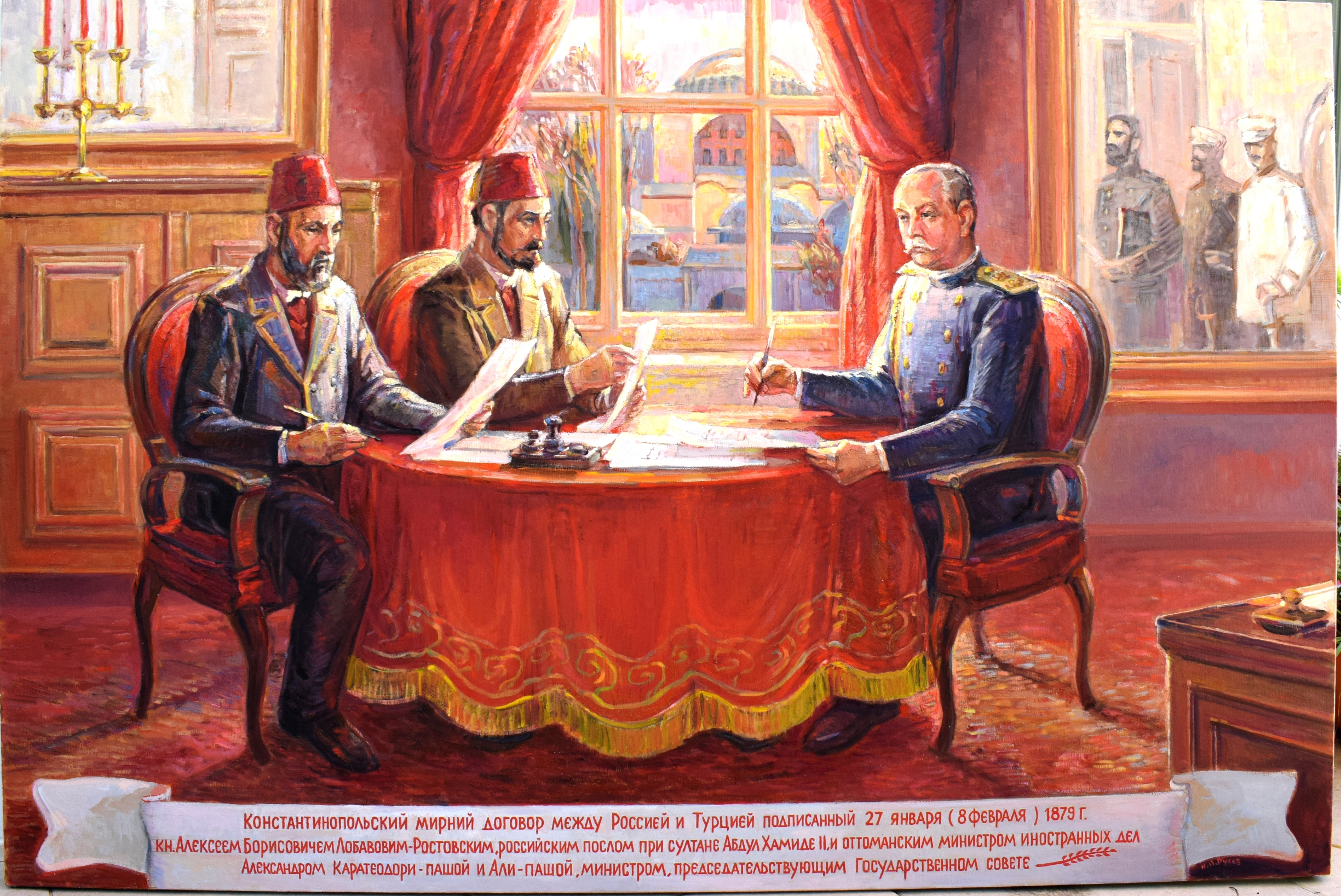
Signing of the Peace of Constantinople on January 27, 1879. This painting is in the Panorama Military History Museum, Pleven, Bulgaria

The 1879 Peace of Constantinople (Turkish: İstanbul Antlaşması or İstanbul Barışı, Russian: Константинопольский мир) reached between the Russian and Ottoman empires was a treaty signed on February 8, 1879 in Constantinople (modern-day Istanbul, Turkey). Aleksey Lobanov-Rostovsky, Russian ambassador to Sultan Abdul Hamid II, and the Ottoman Minister of Foreign Affairs, Alexander Karatheodori Pasha, and Ali Pasha, the Minister presiding over the Council of State of the Ottoman Empire, were those present to sign the agreement. It is a direct continuation of the Treaty of San Stefano.

== Terms of the treaty ==
The treaty was translated into English by Coleman Phillipson in Termination of War and Treaties of Peace. The original treaties are in French, Russian and Turkish.

Article 1

From now on, there will be peace and friendship between the two empires.

Article 2

Both sides declare in agreement that the terms of the Treaty of Berlin, negotiated between the seven Powers, have superseded those articles of the San Stefai Preliminary Treaty which were repealed or amended by the Congress.

Article 3

The terms of the Treaty of San Stefano, which were neither repealed nor modified by the Treaty of Berlin, are definitively determined by the following articles of this Treaty.

Article 4

Excluding the cost of the territories ceded by Turkey to Russia, in accordance with the Berlin Treaty, the military reward remains the amount of eight hundred and two million five hundred thousand francs (802,500,000). The method of payment of this amount and the guarantee to be given therefor (without prejudice to the declarations contained in the Second Berlin Congress concerning the territorial question and the rights of creditors) will be determined by agreement between the governments of the Emperor of All Russia and the Ottoman emperor.

Article 5

Claims of Russian subjects and institutions in Turkey for compensation for losses incurred by them during the continuation of the war will be paid as they are considered by the Russian embassy in Constantinople and transferred to the Sublime Porte.

The total amount of these claims cannot in any case exceed the sum of twenty-six million seven hundred and fifty thousand francs (26,750,000).

The period from which claims may be submitted to the Sublime Porte is one year after ratifications, and the period after which claims will no longer be accepted is two years.

Article 6

Special commissars will be appointed by the imperial Russian government and the Sublime Porte to settle accounts for the costs of maintaining Turkish prisoners of war. These costs will be settled by the day the Berlin Treaty is signed. The expenses incurred by the Ottoman government for the maintenance of Russian prisoners will be deducted from them, and the amount, which will be determined by this, will be paid by the Sublime Porte in twenty-one equal terms over the course of seven years.

Article 7

Residents of areas ceded to Russia, who would like to settle outside these territories, may freely withdraw from them, selling their immovable property. To do this, they are given a period of three years from the date of ratification of this act.

After this period, residents who have not left the country and have not sold their real estate remain Russian subjects.

Article 8

Both sides mutually agree not to pursue or allow any prosecution against Russian or Ottoman subjects who would be suspected of dealing with the armies of both empires during the war. In the event that some persons wished to follow the Russian troops with their families, the Ottoman authorities would not interfere with their departure.

Article 9

A full amnesty is guaranteed for all Ottoman subjects involved in recent events in the regions of European Turkey, and all persons who are detained as a result of this, as well as those exiled or removed from their homeland, will immediately be allowed to enter without restriction.

Article 10

All treatises, conventions and obligations concluded between the two parties regarding trade, jurisdiction and the position of Russian subjects in Turkey, and which were terminated on the occasion of the war, shall again enter into force, and both governments will be decreed relative to each other, on all their obligations and relations, commercial and otherwise, in the same position in which they were before the declaration of war, except for the conditions from which the derogation is made by this act or by virtue of the Treaty of Berlin.

Article 11

The Sublime Porte will take great measures for the amicable end of all disputed and unresolved cases of Russian subjects for many years, for the reward of the latter, if any, and for the enforcement without delay of decisions already taken.

Article 12

This act will be ratified, and the ratifications will take place in St. Petersburg within two weeks, or earlier if possible.

In witness whereof, the Plenipotentiaries of Russia and Turkey signed hereto and affixed the seals of their coats of arms.

Agreed upon at Constantinople on February 8, 1879.

== Literature ==
- Coleman Phillipson: Termination of War and Treaties of Peace 2008, ISBN 978158477860 p. 403 ff.
- Константинопольский мир 1879 // Большая российская энциклопедия : [в 35 т.] / гл. ред. Ю. С. Осипов. — М. : Большая российская энциклопедия, 2004—2017.
- Сборник договоров России с другими государствами. 1856-1917, М.. 1952

== See also ==
- Russo-Turkish War (1877–1878)
