= Thomas Raffles Hughes =

Sir Thomas Raffles Hughes, KC (28 January 1856 – 24 October 1938) was a British barrister. Prominent at the Chancery Bar, he was chairman of the General Council of the Bar from 1920 to 1931.

The son of Edward Hughes of Huyton Hall, Lancashire, Thomas Hughes was educated at Birkenhead School and Trinity College, Cambridge, where was a scholar and took second-class honours in the classical tripos in 1878.

He was called to the bar by Lincoln's Inn in 1880, and was the pupil of Matthew Ingle Joyce, later a Chancery judge. He joined the Northern Circuit and practiced there until he took silk in 1898, when he settled in London, practising in the court of Mr Justice Byrne, then of Mr Justice Farwell. When his pupil-master Ingle Joyce was elevated to the High Court in 1900, Hughes moved to his court, dividing up the work with Robert Younger KC (later Lord Blanesburgh).

Unlike other Chancery silks, Hughes never went "special" but attached himself to a succession of Chancery judges. He never became a judge, possibly owing the paucity of Chancery Division vacancies as well as timing.

Hughes became chairman of the General Council of the Bar in 1920 in succession to John Alderson Foote, KC, serving until 1931. He was knighted in 1926.
