= Coleman Phillipson =

English legal scholar and historian

Coleman Phillipson (25 April 1875? 1878? – 1958) was an English legal scholar and historian. He was Professor of Law at University of Adelaide 1919–1925.

== History ==
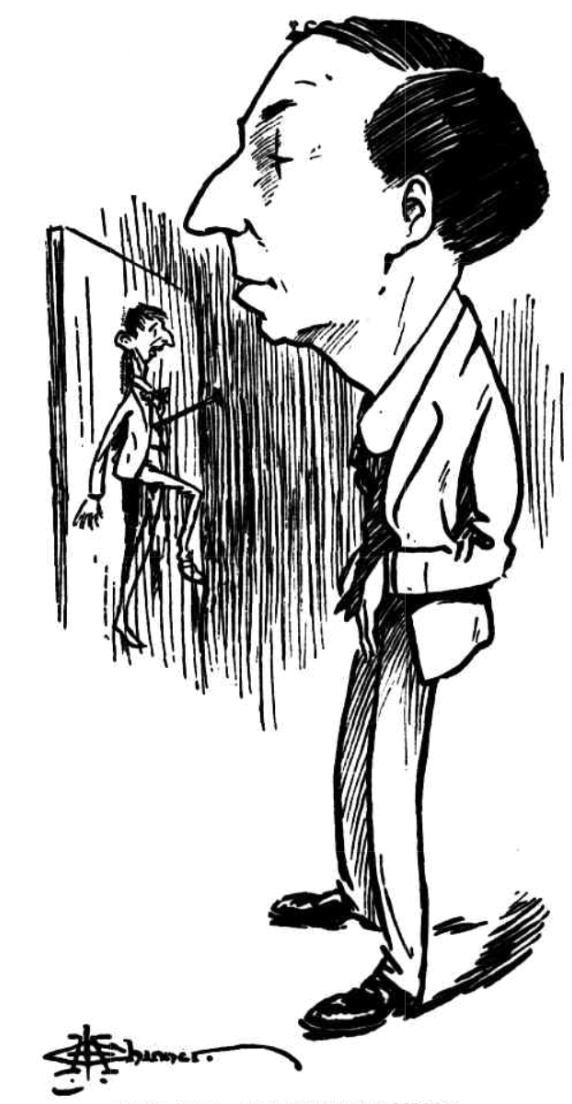
Caricature by J. H. Chinner

Phillipson was born in Leeds, Yorkshire, England, the eldest son of Mr and Mrs S. Phillipson, both practising Jews. He was educated at the Central High School, Leeds, and Yorkshire College, University of Leeds, where he won prizes for French, English literature, theory of education, and debating. He secured a teaching position in a boarding school before embarking on Law studies at the Victoria University of Manchester followed by the University College of London, where he was Quain prizeman in Comparative Law 1906–1908. Around 1906 he had the degree of LL.D conferred on him (their first) by Victoria University, Manchester which in 1910 awarded him a D.Litt. consequent on his admission to the Inner Temple and publication of several books on international law.

He practised for thirteen years in London, and held briefs from the Crown concerning points of Constitutional and International Law. During the Great War he confidential work for the War Cabinet, the Foreign Office, and the Admiralty. He was responsible for drawing up of various reports for the commission, on responsibility for the war and offences committed by the enemy. His compilation and analysis of such offences became a Bluebook.

He assisted the British Crown Law department in formulating the Peace Treaty of 1919.

Sir Frederick Smith, (later Lord Chancellor) in a standard work, gave his opinion that "Professor Phillipson is one of the greatest living authorities on international law".

=== In Australia ===
In December 1919 the Registrar of the University of Adelaide (C. R. Hodge) announced that Phillipson had been appointed Professor of Law, a post made vacant by the resignation, due to ill health, of Dr Jethro Brown. He was appointed Dean of the Faculty of Law in 1921.

He gave many public lectures while in Adelaide, including:

- "The Principles and Aims of the League of Nations" on 30 August 1920.
- "The Teachings of Lao-Tse and His Message for the Present Time" on 6 October 1920
- "International Conferences" on 10 March 1921
- "Paris Peace Conference — Personal Reminiscences" on 12 May 1921
- "The League of Nations" (Note: His defence of the terms of the Versailles Peace Treaty prompted a great deal of controversy. One newspaper editor's criticism may be read here and in following issues.) 28 June 1921
- "How Treaties of Peace are Made" 24 August 1921
- "Dante" on 14 September 1921 (600th anniversary of his death)
- "L'esprit Français et la poésie Française moderne." 14 July 1922
- "Plays in relation to life" 1 August 1922 (Note: Phillipson gave many talks to the Adelaide Repertory Society)
- "Trial by Jury" 22 March 1923
- "The Profession of Politics" 2 May 1923
- "Crime and Punishment", (Note: Phillipson was a member of the Romilly Society, opponents of capital punishment and long fixed sentences.) a series delivered in September 1923
- "Wit and Humour" 21 May 1924
- "Art and Life" (Note: He created a storm when he labeled Norman Lindsay's nudes as depraved and degenerate.) 24 August 1924
- "The conception of tragedy in dramatic literature." 12 May 1925

Phillipson resigned on 15 May 1925 after a series of attacks on his practice of giving private lessons to students who were falling behind in their grades, and rumors of blackmail. The climax of the affair was a note pinned to his door:

Coleman Phillipson, Blackmailer. Get out, you dirty swine.

He also complained of lack of documentary resources for his research and the council's refusal to allow him to practise Law privately. The university gave him paid leave to the end of the year.

== Family ==
Phillipson was a brother of Mrs. A. Charles of Mount Street south, Coogee, and Mrs. M. Goldstein, Mrs. Alfred Saunders, and Harry Phillipson, all of Melbourne, and Major Julian Higham Phillipson (20 November 1913 – ) of Western Australia. Other siblings were Maurice Phillipson of Leeds, and Mr. A. B. Phillipson who was an administrator in a province of India.

Mrs Phillipson accompanied her husband to Australia, and while there took part in the Adelaide Repertory Society's production of Israel Zangwill's The Melting Pot as "Frau Quixano".

== Publications ==
- Studies in International Law 1908
- 'Effective War on Contracts 1909 (typo?)
- The International Law and Custom of Ancient Greece and Rome (two volumes) (1910) Macmillan
- (with John Alderson Foote) Foreign and Domestic Law. A concise treatise on private international jurisprudence, based on the decisions in the English Courts (1914) Stevens & Haynes, London
- The International Law and Custom of Ancient Greece and Rome (1911) Macmillan and Co., London
- International Law and the Great War (1915) T. Fisher Unwin, Ltd, London
- Termination of War and Treaties of Peace (1916) E. P. Dutton & Co., New York; T. F. Unwin Ltd, London
- Wheaton's Elements of International Law 5th English ed., rev. throughout, considerably enl. and re-written (1916) Stevens and Sons, Ltd, London; Baker, Voorhis & Co., New York
- (with Noel Buxton) The Question of the Bosphorus and Dardanelles (1917) Stevens & Haynes, London
- Alsace-Lorraine — Past, Present, and Future (1918) T. F. Unwin, Ltd., London
- (with F. E. Smith, 1st Earl of Birkenhead) International Law (1918) E. P. Dutton & Co., New York
- (with Thomas Pitt Taswell-Langmead) English Constitutional History : from the Teutonic Conquest to the Present Time (1919) Houghton Mifflin, Boston

also

- Mayne's Treatise on Damages
- much of Great Jurists of the World (1913)
- Three Criminal Law Reformers (1920)
