= Association of Costs Lawyers =

- Abbreviation: ACL
- Formation: 1977; 49 years ago
- Type: Professional association
- Headquarters: 16 Broad Street; Eye, Suffolk, IP23
- Region served: England and Wales
- Services: Costs litigation
- Chair: Jack Ridgway
- Board of directors: ACL Council
- Subsidiaries: Costs Lawyer Standards Board; ACL Training
- Affiliations: Legal Services Board; General Council of the Bar; Law Society of England and Wales
- Website: associationofcostslawyers.co.uk
- Formerly called: Association of Law Costs Draftsmen

The Association of Costs Lawyers (ACL) is a professional association that represents costs lawyers in England and Wales. It was originally established in 1977 as the Association of Law Costs Draftsmen, but the name was changed in January 2011.

The ACL became an "authorised body" or legal regulator, specifically for law costs draftsmen, on 1 January 2007. As a consequence of Schedule 4 of the Legal Services Act 2007, the ACL was listed as one of a number of authorised bodies regulating the carrying out of reserved legal activities. Specifically, costs lawyers can conduct costs litigation, and can administer oaths, with rights of audience in all courts in England and Wales. Under Practice Direction 46.5 of the Civil Procedure Rules, a Fellow of the ACL (or a law costs draftsman with membership of The Academy of Experts or the Expert Witness Institute) can be retained by a litigant in person as experts on costs.

== Organisation ==
The ACL is governed by a Council, consisting of a Chairman and seven members, all elected for three year terms.

The Legal Services Act 2007 resulted in the creation of an autonomous regulatory arm, the Costs Lawyer Standards Board, which began operating in October 2011.

The ACL also has an educational arm, ACL Training, which is the only provider of the qualifications needed to become a costs lawyer.

== Challenges ==
Costs lawyers face several challenges, due in part to their profession being less well known than other types of lawyers such as solicitors and barristers. The ACL has spoken out on several occasions in support of costs lawyers. An example is the lack of recognition by other lawyers, something that was criticised by a judge in October 2018.

Another serious threat comes from the possibility of fixed costs in litigation following the Jackson reforms. This might eliminate the need for costs budgets and cost management conferences, which form the mainstay of the work of costs lawyers.

== See also ==
- General Council of the Bar
- Law Society of England and Wales
- Chartered Institute of Legal Executives
