= Claims management company =

A claims management company is a business that offers claims management services to the public. Claims management services consist of advice or services in respect of claims for compensation, restitution, repayment or any other remedy for loss or damage, or in respect of some other obligation. Claims management services cover litigation, or claims under regulation schemes or voluntary arrangements.

== History ==
The abolition of legal aid for personal injury claims, the introduction of conditional fee agreements and the appearance of and growth in claims management companies led to a rapid expansion of litigation from the mid-1990s. This led to public concern at the development of a "compensation culture". The collapse of claims management company the Accident Group in 2003 increased disquiet with the system. Such companies used aggressive sales techniques and exaggerated claims, profiting from exorbitant commissions on after the event insurance policies. It was estimated that there were about 1,000 such companies in the UK in 2003. However, there was still evidence that many meritorious claims were discouraged by the difficulties and costs of litigation. These concerns, especially around the operation of conditional fee agreements, led to regulation of the market by Part 2 of the Compensation Act 2006. The activities regulated are those common to the market and which had caused concern:

- Advertising for cases;
- Advising a claimant in respect of claims;
- Certain large-scale referral activities;
- Investigating the circumstances, merits or foundation of a claim, with a view to litigation;
- Representing a claimant to any body, in writing or orally;

— in respect of claims:

- For personal injuries;
- Under the Criminal Injuries Compensation Scheme;
- For certain benefits arising from industrial injuries;
- In relation to employment law;
- For housing disrepair;
- In relation to financial products or services.

== Regulation ==
In England and Wales, as of 23 April 2007, an individual or a corporation may not, unless exempt or otherwise in receipt of a waiver, provide claims management services by way of business unless authorised by the Claims Management Services Regulator. It is a crime for an unauthorised person to provide or offer claims management services, or to pretend to be authorised. Offenders are punishable, on summary conviction, by a fine of up to level 5 on the standard scale or 51 weeks' imprisonment. If convicted on indictment in the Crown Court, offenders can be sentenced to an unlimited fine or two years' imprisonment. Where a corporate crime is committed, the offender can only be fined and not imprisoned. The claims regulator also covers the processing and evaluation of complaints against claims management companies.

Solicitors, barristers, advocates and some other lawyers are exempt, as are:

- Persons regulated by the Financial Services and Markets Act 2000;
- Charities and not for profit bodies;
- Motor Insurers' Bureau;
- Medical Protection Society, Medical Defence Union, and Medical and Dental Defence Union of Scotland; and
- Trade Unions.

Incidental referrals to lawyers are also exempt as are services in respect of counterclaims, or claims for contribution or indemnity.

== Claims Management Services Regulator ==
The Claims Management Services Regulator was created by section 11 of the Compensation Act 2006. The post of Regulator was held by the Secretary of State for Justice to authorise and regulate claims management companies and:

- Set and monitor standards of competence and professional conduct;
- Promote good practice, in particular as to the provision of information about charges and other matters to users;
- Promote practices likely to facilitate competition;
- Ensure that arrangements are made for the protection of users, including complaints handling.

The rules and procedure for authorisation are defined in the Compensation (Claims Management Services) Regulations 2006. The Regulator may investigate unauthorised trading and seek an injunction to prevent it or bring a criminal prosecution. It is a crime to obstruct the Regulator, punishable on summary conviction by a fine of up to level 5 on the standard scale.

A person may appeal a decision of the Regulator about authorisation to the Claims Management Services Tribunal and there is a further route of appeal to the Court of Appeal.

When section 161 of the Legal Services Act 2007 comes into force, claims management services and the Regulator will fall under the supervision of the Office for Legal Complaints and its ombudsman scheme. It has been suggested that the first complaints will not be handled until 2010.

== Claims Management Services Tribunal ==
The Claims Management Services Tribunal was created by section 12 of the Compensation Act 2006 to hear:

- appeals from persons against a decision of the Regulator about authorisation; and
- after section 13(2) of the 2006 Act comes into force, references from the Claims Management Services Regulator in respect of complaints or questions about the professional conduct of a claims management company.

In January 2010 the Tribunal was abolished and its functions transferred to the First-tier Tribunal.

== Transfer of Regulation to the FCA ==
On 1 April 2019, regulation of claims management companies was transferred to the Financial Conduct Authority. Claims management companies previously regulated by the Claims Management Services Regulator, and that wished to continue trading, had to register for temporary permission by 31 March 2019.

== Bibliography ==
- Better Regulation Task Force (2004) Better Routes to Redress, Cabinet Office
- Department of Constitutional Affairs (2004) Making Simple CFAs a Reality, CP22/04
- Office of Public Sector Information (2006) Explanatory Notes to Compensation Act 2006, TSO
