= Costs lawyer =

Legal professional concerned with legal costs

In English law, a costs lawyer is a legal professional concerned with legal costs who has attained rights of audience and rights to conduct costs litigation.

Costs lawyers are concerned with all aspects of solicitor costs that are controlled by both statute and common law. They are concerned with costs relating to all areas of the law and deal with every conceivable type of legal matter that touches upon the subject of costs. A costs lawyer's skill is as essential to successful litigation as that of a solicitor or barrister.

From January 2011, the Association of Law Costs Draftsmen changed its name to the Association of Costs Lawyers. The Association of Costs Lawyers was granted Authorised Body Status by The Association of Law Costs Draftsmen Order 2006 (S.I. 2006 no 3333) which came into force on 1 January 2007.

== Qualification ==
From the introduction of costs lawyer status in 2007 until 2011 any law costs draftsman who had successfully passed the Association of Costs Lawyer's training course, and had worked in costs for at least 5 years, would become a Fellow of the Association. The Fellow was then required to successfully complete an advocacy course to become a costs lawyer.

However the process to become a costs lawyer has changed. Anyone (who is not currently a fellow of the ACL) that now wishes to become a costs lawyer must complete the Association of Costs Lawyers' Costs Lawyer Professional Qualification (or 'CLPQ' for short). The CLPQ is a two-year modular training course, in which trainee costs lawyers must pass both theory and practical exams in order to qualify. In addition they must also have been gained at least 2 years of relevant experience. Some exemptions are made for those with related degrees or qualifications to reduce the number of years or modules undertaken.

== Rights of audience ==
Costs lawyers have rights of audience in all proceedings being conducted under Parts 43–48 of the Civil Procedure Rules 1999 and under Part 52 with regard to appeals from detailed assessments before a High Court Judge or a Circuit Court Judge.

They hold rights of audience in all proceedings at first instance relating to costs before the Supreme Court of the United Kingdom (and previously the House of Lords) and the Judicial Committee of the Privy Council.

They also have rights of audience in all determinations as to costs in Community Legal Service regulations, Criminal Defence regulations, under section 16 of the Prosecution of Offences Act 1985 and the costs in Criminal Cases (General) Regulations 1986.

A costs lawyer has the right to litigate under sections 64(3) and (4), 68, 69, 70, 71 and 74 of the Solicitors Act 1974 and any subsequent enactment of provisions thereof.

== Commissioners for oaths ==
A costs lawyer has the right to administer oaths and take affidavits under section 113 of the Courts and Legal Services Act 1990.

== Areas of involvement ==
The three main areas in which costs lawyers may become involved are:

=== Costs payable between parties ===
The unsuccessful litigant is usually ordered to pay the successful litigant's costs and, if those costs cannot be agreed, a detailed bill of costs is prepared and served. The paying party then has to serve a schedule of points of those items in the bill he wishes to dispute before the bill is lodged at court and a detailed assessment hearing takes place at which the points are argued and a decision made by the court.

A Costs Lawyer will also usually be involved in the costs management of substantive proceedings, by preparing and managing costs budgeting processes (also known as a Precedent H). On the conclusion of proceedings, the successful party will generally prepare a detailed item-by-item Bill of Costs, and initiate detailed assessment proceedings. Negotiations can then take place between the parties between the parties, with written legal submissions being exchanged via Points of Dispute and Points of Reply. If the parties still cannot agree costs, then the matter will be lodged at Court for the Bill of Costs to be assessed by a Judge, either on the papers (provisional assessment) or at an attended hearing at which oral submissions will be made by both parties (detailed assessment hearing).

=== Solicitor and client costs ===
These are costs payable by a client to his own solicitor. Different rules apply to the costs where court proceedings have been commenced, known as contentious business, to those applicable to non-contentious matters such as conveyancing, probate and general advice. A client who is unhappy with his solicitor's bill has remedies available if he wishes to challenge it. If either the client or the solicitor is dissatisfied with the outcome of that request or if the bill relates to contentious business, either the client or the solicitor may apply to the court for the bill to be assessed. A costs lawyer may be instructed to prepare a detailed bill of costs for assessment, to advise on law and procedure and, subsequently, if instructed by a solicitor or a litigant, to argue in support or to oppose the bill.

=== Public funded (legal aid) costs ===
Where a solicitor is representing a publicly funded client, a detailed bill is usually required to be assessed either by the court or the Legal Services Commission before payment can be made out of the community legal fund to the solicitor. Whilst such bills are usually assessed without any formal hearing, if an amount has been disallowed in respect of which the solicitor wishes to object, an appointment can be obtained and the matter argued at a hearing. In criminal cases, the objections to an amount disallowed are usually made in writing and, often, a costs lawyer will be instructed to prepare the written submissions.

For civil legal aid matters, cost claims are generally quantified by a Legal Aid Costs Draftsman or Costs Lawyer and submitted on CCMS for processing, with a return timescale for assessment of between 2 - 4 weeks.

== Compliance with rules and regulations ==
The ACL has bylaws, a code of conduct, regulations and rules that all members are required to comply with at all times. New members are required to certify that they have read all bylaws, a code of conduct, regulations and rules and agree to be bound by these.

=== Continuing professional development ===
All members, except retired and affiliate members, are required to undertake 12 hours in continuing professional development each year.

=== Insurance ===
With the exception of those costs lawyers who work exclusively in a solicitor's office on a PAYE basis (i.e. in-house), all members of the association are required to produce proof by declaration from an insurer or broker that either as an individual or as a partner, director or employee of a firm of law costs draftsmen (i.e. freelance) work undertaken is protected by professional indemnity insurance cover to the value of at least £100,000 plus loss of documents cover.

== See also ==
- Law Costs Draftsman
