= Taxation of costs =

Legal term

Taxation of costs is a ministerial function performed by a court upon the resolution of case. It involves entering the various costs and their amounts against the party (either the claimant or defendant) against whom those costs have been awarded by the court. The itemisation of costs or the subsequent determination of the costs that should be allowed is not a determination of the outcome of the litigation.

This is now known as detailed assessment in English law following the Civil Procedure Act 1997.

In early common law costs were unknown, but as early as 1278 an English statute was passed whereby costs could be awarded to the prevailing party.

Such costs can include items such as witness fees, mileage and subsistence, marshal's fees, attorney's and other docket fees, and a reporter's charge for transcript.

In the United States Federal Court system, where lawyers' fees are rarely paid by the losing party, common costs taxed include "Fees of the clerk and marshal;" transcripts; "disbursements for printing and witnesses;" copies; "Docket fees under section 1923 of this title; and "Compensation of court appointed experts, [and] interpreters...."

== See also ==
- Conduct money
- Court costs
- Legal fees
- User fee
