= Kirsty Brimelow =

British barrister

Kirsty Brimelow KC
- Born: 5 August 1969 (age 56); Chorley, Lancashire, England
- Education: Birmingham University
- Occupation: Barrister
- Years active: 1993–present

Kirsty Brimelow is a barrister of England and Wales and KC practising from Doughty Street Chambers. She is elected Chair of the Bar Council of England and Wales 2026, having served a year as Vice Chair. She practises in the national and international courts and tribunals in international human rights, criminal law and public law. She is a Bencher of Gray's Inn and was an elected member of its management committee. She was International Pro Bono Barrister of the Year in 2018 and was Chair of the Bar Human Rights Committee (2012–2018).

She obtained an LLB Hons from Birmingham University and then studied at the Inns of Court School of Law to be called to the Bar in 1991. She was a pupil at Littleton Chambers in 1993. She was appointed Queen’s Counsel in 2011. In 2021 she was appointed trustee of WWF UK. In 2021, she was elected Vice-Chair of the Criminal Bar Association of England and Wales. She was Chair of the Criminal Bar Association from 1 September 2022- 1 September 2023.

She became Chair when criminal barristers were engaged in an historic all-out strike. She opened and led negotiations with the government which resulted in a 15% increase in defence fees on ongoing and future cases(increased to 17% at the end of 2022 as extra payments took effect). She then worked with the Crown Prosecution Service to introduce a similar increase. The increase of fees to both defence and prosecution within 8 months is historic.

Brimelow was the 6th female Chair in the CBA's 53 year history.

In 2021 Brimelow was appointed a Recorder (part-time Crown Court Judge) and a Deputy High Court Judge.

Brimelow was the recipient of the First 100 years "inspirational Barrister of the year" award in 2018 and then went on to judge the awards in 2019. She presented the inaugural Heilbron lecture in 2020. She is a frequent legal commentator in the media and a writer for The Times newspaper. She has given expert evidence to parliamentary committees and provides expert opinions on bills of parliament. She led the proposal for and advised on the groundbreaking FGM injunction law. Kirsty also is an accredited mediator. She mediated a historic apology from the former President of Colombia President Santos to the peace community San José de Apartadó. She was the only foreign barrister to attend the signing of the peace accord in Cartagena in 2016.

Brimelow has worked as a trainer in child rights with Unicef Nigeria for many years. She also has led training of the Nigerian Bar Association on environment law and international human rights and internally displaced persons and terrorism and rights. She was allegedly a victim of the News International phone hacking scandal. She is well known for her international human rights work as well as expertise in the law of peaceful protest. In international law, currently, she is heading a project as a consultant to Unicef Myanmar in child rights. She is also representing Mohamed Nasheed, former President of the Maldives.

In January 2026 Brimelow became the chair of the Bar council, taking over from Barbara Mills (barrister). Brimelow's team on the council was the first all female team in the council's history.
