= Medical and Dental Defence Union of Scotland =

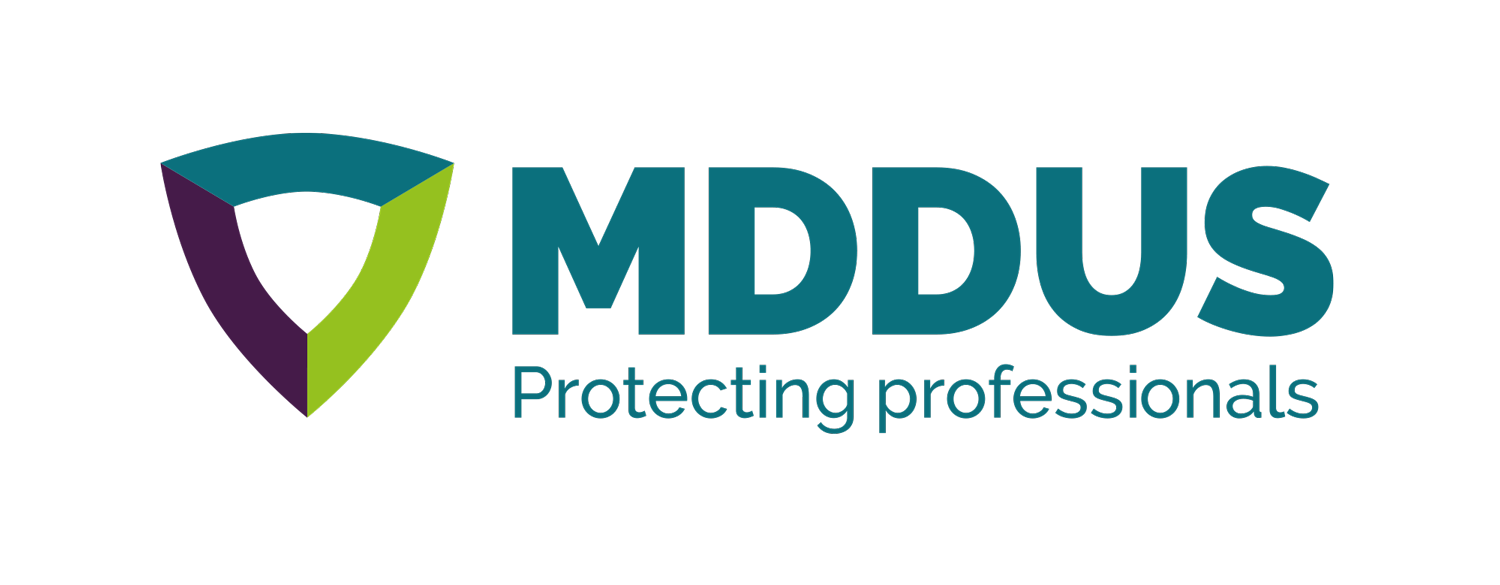
- MDDUS (The Medical and Dental Defence Union Scotland) Logo 2021
- Founded: May 1902 in Glasgow, Scotland
- Products: professional indemnity
- Website: www.mddus.com

The Medical and Dental Defence Union of Scotland (MDDUS) is one of three major medical defence organisations (MDOs) in the UK and offers professional indemnity and medico-legal and dento-legal advice for doctors, dentists and other healthcare professionals throughout the United Kingdom. MDDUS is a mutual organisation and was founded in 1902. It is recognised by the UK's General Medical Council.

At the University of Glasgow, the MDDUS offers the "Medical and Dental Defence Union of Scotland Prize for Medical Jurisprudence" annually.
