= John Alderson Foote =

John Alderson Foote, KC (15 December 1848 – 26 April 1922) was a British barrister. He was Recorder of Exeter from 1899 until his death.

== Biography ==
Born in Plymouth, the eldest son of Captain John Foote, RN, Foote was educated at Charterhouse School and St John's College, Cambridge (Minor Scholarship, 1868; Scholar, 1870). He took first class honours in Classical Tripos, 1872, won the Chancellor's Medal in 1873, was the Senior Whewell Scholar of International Law in 1873, and won the Senior Studentship (Inns of Court Examination) in 1874.

Called to the Bar in 1875, he joined Western Circuit, was appointed a Revising Barrister in 1892, Counsel to the Post Office (Western Circuit) in 1893. He was appointed a Queen's Counsel in 1897, elected a Bencher Lincoln's Inn in 1905, appointed a Commissioner of Assize for the North-Eastern Circuit in 1913, and Counsel to Cambridge University in 1915. From 1918 to 1920 he was Chairman of the General Council of the Bar.

He was the author of Private International Law, which went through several editions, and Pie-Powder: Being Dust from the Law Courts: Collected and Recollected on the Western Circuit, by a Circuit Tramp, a collection of Foote's reminiscences of his experiences as a traveling barrister on the English Western Circuit in the 19th century. A court of piepowders, mentioned in the book's title, was a special tribunal in England organized by a borough on the occasion of a fair or market.
