= The Accident Group =

Personal injury claims management company

- Industry: Claims management company
- Predecessor: Motorlaw
- Founded: May 2003
- Founder: Mark Langford

The Accident Group was a Manchester-based personal injury claims management company that went into administration in May 2003. The firm gained notoriety for firing 2,400 workers by text message, which, according to BBC reports, led to the firm's offices being emptied of computer equipment by disgruntled staff. The business was placed into administration the day before staff were due their monthly salaries.

== Formation, business model ==
Mark Langford (29 May 1964 – 9 April 2007) trained to become a solicitor. However, after failing to qualify he started Motorlaw before launching The Accident Group in 1999.

== Administration ==
In light of a change in the law, the model on which the Accident Group operated began to fail. Legal costs undertaken by the claimant were moved from claimable against the other party, to payable by the claimant. This meant that the amount of money paid to claimants dramatically fell, whilst the money payable to solicitors undertaking the claims was too high.

In addition, the number of false claims filed by claimants began to cause concern to investors. A BBC One program, The Man That Made Accidents Happen, interviewed the former Accident Group special investigator Paul Stott. Mr Stott focused on the practice of multiple claims – the practice in which a single claimant would sometimes make claims for many different accidents. He also found that some salespeople also made many multiple claims for themselves. Stott claimed that one couple who both worked for the company and had made 33 claims for themselves, of which nine were accepted by the company, and made a further 40 claims for people living in their street, and another 68 claims on two addresses nearby where their friends lived: of the total, 24 were accepted by the Accident Group. Stott said that many claims went through, defeating the checking procedures the company had put in place, saying: "Working on the figures that I had to hand at the time, of the totally ridiculous claims, 30 per cent went through."

After administrators were called in, notoriously most of the firm's 2,400 employees were dismissed via SMS text message sent by Langford which read:

Urgent. Unfortunately salaries not paid. Please do not contact office. Full details to follow later today.

Parent group Amulet Group, which was also put into administration in May 2003, said its subsidiary The Accident Group had to cease trading because it could not sustain its "continual battles with the insurance industry" and after "the sudden failure of a banking partner to support the company". The administrators Price Waterhouse Coopers, later blamed Accident Group's "lower than expected claims success rate" for the financial difficulties, which they said "resulted in increased insurance premiums on new business and retrospective claims from the underwriters.".

The closure of the business may have been a shock to staff but not to the Langfords. Knowing that the business was close to folding they sequestered £20m into the offshore account held in the name of Debbie Langford. Staff were informed of the closure on payday and the salary run, approx £5m, did not go through.

Staff, who were not allowed to join a union, and who didn't receive their final salaries or a follow-up email (as promised in the infamous text message), ransacked the Manchester head office and the Liverpool office and took away computers and other equipment.

In 2011, Anthony Dennison, a lawyer who acted for the firm and who was appointed by Mark Langford, was struck off from the Roll of Solicitors for "dishonesty". "The original tribunal heard Mr Dennison withdrew £680,000 in dividends from LRS between 1999 and 2003, before eventually selling his stake for more than £1.5m. He claimed no more than a net £37,000 of the £680,000 related to Rowe Cohen clients. It found the various services Rowe Cohen provided were a conflict of interest and fined five of its partners, including Mr Dennison, between £1,000 and £3,500. He was hit with an additional £20,000 for concealing his links to LRS." Dennison part-owned Legal Report Services (LRS) which wrote medical reports for RC legal clients. His clients and fellow partners at his legal firm did not know of his share holding in LRS."

== Death of Mark Langford ==
In June 2000, Mark Langford was convicted of careless driving. This was the outcome of a November 1998 incident in which he had knocked down and killed 73-year-old William Thornley while driving a Ferrari 355 F1 Spider close to Old Trafford football stadium, Manchester. Langford had to be cut free from the wreckage of the convertible, and sustained a broken thumb and finger. He was, however, found not guilty of causing death by dangerous driving.

Langford fled to Spain after the company's collapse. Although having an estimated fortune of between £40m and £75m, Langford had previously been served with a High Court bankruptcy writ aboard his £1.5million 80 ft yacht Mermaid's Whisper in Puerto Banús. Langford had adjourned the hearing until 1 May 2007 after claiming he was suffering from “severe mental illness leading to manic depression." In his absence he was being sought by HM Customs and Excise for £4.1 million in unpaid taxes, and the Department of Trade and Industry was seeking to disqualify him as a company director.

Langford died in an accident when his Opel Corsa left the road in an accident in Marbella, Spain, on 9 April 2007.
