= Legal Services Act 2007 =

Act of the Parliament of the United Kingdom

Legal Services Act 2007 (Note: Section 214.)
- Act of Parliament
- Parliament of the United Kingdom
- Long title: An Act to make provision for the establishment of the Legal Services Board and in respect of its functions; to make provision for, and in connection with, the regulation of persons who carry on certain legal activities; to make provision for the establishment of the Office for Legal Complaints and for a scheme to consider and determine legal complaints; to make provision about claims management services and about immigration advice and immigration services; to make provision in respect of legal representation provided free of charge; to make provision about the application of the Legal Profession and Legal Aid (Scotland) Act 2007; to make provision about the Scottish legal services ombudsman; and for connected purposes.
- Citation: 2007 c. 29
- Introduced by: Bridget Prentice MP (Commons); Lord Falconer Secretary of State for Constitutional Affairs, 23 November 2006 (Lords)
- Territorial extent: England and Wales (Note: Section 212.)

Dates
- Royal assent: 30 October 2007
- Commencement: 7 March 2008 (Note: Section 211. The Legal Services Act 2007 (Commencement No.1 and Transitory Provisions) Order 2008.)
Other legislation
Amends	Powers of Attorney Act 1971; Solicitors Act 1974; House of Commons Disqualification Act 1975; Bail Act 1976; Magistrates' Courts Act 1980; Solicitors (Scotland) Act 1980; County Courts Act 1984; Inheritance Tax Act 1984; Law of Property (Miscellaneous Provisions) Act 1989; Law Reform (Miscellaneous Provisions) (Scotland) Act 1990; Courts and Legal Services Act 1990; Agricultural Tenancies Act 1995; Police Act 1996; Youth Justice and Criminal Evidence Act 1999; Access to Justice Act 1999; Immigration and Asylum Act 1999; Constitutional Reform Act 2005; Mental Capacity Act 2005; Equality Act 2006; National Health Service Act 2006; National Health Service (Wales) Act 2006; Tribunals, Courts and Enforcement Act 2007
Amended by	List: Criminal Justice and Immigration Act 2008; Legal Services Act 2007 (Functions of a Designated Regulator) Order 2008; Coroners and Justice Act 2009; Finance Act 2009, Schedule 47 (Consequential Amendments) Order 2009; Finance Act 2009, Section 96 and Schedule 48 (Appointed Day, Savings and Consequential Amendments) Order 2009; Legal Services Act 2007 (Approved Regulators) Order 2009; Legal Services Act 2007 (Functions of an Approved Regulator) Order 2009; Transfer of Tribunal Functions Order 2010; Equality Act 2010 (Consequential Amendments, Saving and Supplementary Provisions) Order 2010; Postal Services Act 2011; Charities Act 2011; Treaty of Lisbon (Changes in Terminology) Order 2011; Equality Act 2010 (Public Authorities and Consequential and Supplementary Amendments) Order 2011; Legal Aid, Sentencing and Punishment of Offenders Act 2012; Finance Act 2012; Financial Services Act 2012; Public Bodies (Abolition of Crown Court Rule Committee and Magistrates' Courts Rule Committee) Order 2012; Tribunals, Courts and Enforcement Act 2007 (Consequential Amendments) Order 2012; Legal Services Act 2007 (Alteration of Limit) Order 2012; Statute Law (Repeals) Act 2013; Crime and Courts Act 2013; Enterprise and Regulatory Reform Act 2013; Financial Services (Banking Reform) Act 2013; Police and Fire Reform (Scotland) Act 2012 (Consequential Provisions and Modifications) Order 2013; Financial Services and Markets Act 2000 (Regulated Activities) (Amendment) (No.2) Order 2013; Public Bodies (Abolition of Administrative Justice and Tribunals Council) Order 2013; Crime and Courts Act 2013 (Family Court: Consequential Provision) Order 2014; Enterprise and Regulatory Reform Act 2013 (Competition) (Consequential, Transitional and Saving Provisions) Order 2014; Consumer Rights Act 2015; Deregulation Act 2015; Legal Services Act 2007 (The Law Society) (Modification of Functions) Order 2015; Investigatory Powers Act 2016; Deregulation Act 2015 and Small Business, Enterprise and Employment Act 2015 (Consequential Amendments) (Savings) Regulations 2017; Data Protection Act 2018; EEA Passport Rights (Amendment, etc., and Transitional Provisions) (EU Exit) Regulations 2018; Financial Services and Markets Act 2000 (Claims Management Activity) Order 2018; Trade Marks (Amendment etc.) (EU Exit) Regulations 2019; Services of Lawyers and Lawyer's Practice (Revocation etc.) (EU Exit) Regulations 2019; Services of Lawyers and Lawyer's Practice (Amendment) (EU Exit) Regulations 2019; Sentencing Act 2020; Intellectual Property (Amendment etc.) (EU Exit) Regulations 2020; Services of Lawyers and Lawyer's Practice (Revocation etc.) (EU Exit) Regulations 2020; Judicial Review and Courts Act 2022; Criminal Justice Act 2003 (Commencement No. 33) and Sentencing Act 2020 (Commencement No. 2) Regulations 2022; Economic Crime and Corporate Transparency Act 2023; Judicial Review and Courts Act 2022 (Magistrates' Court Sentencing Powers) Regulations 2023; Digital Markets, Competition and Consumers Act 2024

Status: Amended

History of passage through Parliament

Text of statute as originally enacted

Revised text of statute as amended

The Legal Services Act 2007 (c. 29) is an act of the Parliament of the United Kingdom that seeks to liberalise and regulate the market for legal services in England and Wales, to encourage more competition and to provide a new route for consumer complaints. It also makes provisions about the Legal Profession and Legal Aid (Scotland) Act 2007. The act made it an offence to wilfully pretend to be a barrister.

== Regulatory objectives ==
Section 1 of the act defines eight regulatory objectives:

- Protecting and promoting the public interest;
- Supporting the constitutional principle of the rule of law;
- Improving access to justice;
- Protecting and promoting the interests of consumers of legal services;
- Promoting competition in the provision of legal services;
- Encouraging an independent, strong, diverse and effective legal profession;
- Increasing public understanding of the citizen's legal rights and duties;
- Promoting and maintaining adherence to the professional principles;

The professional principles are:

- Authorised persons should act with independence and integrity;
- Authorised persons should maintain proper standards of work;
- Authorised persons should act in the best interests of their clients;
- Persons who exercise before any court a right of audience, or conduct litigation in relation to proceedings in any court, by virtue of being authorised persons should comply with their duty to the court to act with independence in the interests of justice, and
- Affairs of clients should be kept confidential.

== The Legal Services Board ==
Sections 2 to 7 and schedule 1 create the Legal Services Board with a duty to promote the regulatory objectives. David Edmonds was appointed the first chair of the board on 23 April 2008 and nine members were appointed on 17 July. The members took up post on 1 September 2008 and the board became fully operational on 1 January 2010.

The act also created a Consumer Panel to represent consumers (ss. 8–11) which started work on 1 November 2009. The panel is independent of the Legal Services Board and consists of eight lay members whose appointments are approved by the Lord Chancellor. The panel provides advice to the Board and publishes policy briefings, consultation responses, and research reports.

== Reserved legal activities ==
Section 12 and Schedule 2 define six reserved legal activities:

- Exercise of rights of audience;
- Conduct of litigation;
- Reserved instrument activities, being certain activities concerning land registration and real property;
- Probate activities;
- Notarial activities;
- Administration of oaths.

This list can be amended by an Order in Council of the Chancellor (ss. 24–26).

Section 12 then goes on to define, for the purposes of the act, a legal activity as either a reserved legal activity or as the provision of legal advice, assistance or representation in connection with the application of the law or with any form of resolution of legal disputes. Legal activity does not include acting as a mediator or arbitrator.

Only an authorised person or an exempt person can carry out a reserved legal activity (s. 14). It is a crime to carry out a reserved activity otherwise though it is a defence that the person "did not know, and could not reasonably have been expected to know" that they were committing an offence. It is also an offence to pretend to be authorised (s. 17) An offender can be sentenced on summary conviction to up to six months' imprisonment and a fine of up to £5,000. If convicted on indictment in the Crown Court an offender can be sentenced to up to two years' imprisonment and an unlimited fine. An unauthorised person who purports to exercise a right of audience also commits a contempt of court for which he can be punished.

These provisions came into force on 1 January 2010.

== Authorised persons and approved regulators ==
Authorised persons are either (s. 18):

- Persons authorised in respect of a given legal activity by a relevant approved regulator; or
- Licensed bodies authorised in respect of those activities.

Relevant approved regulators are (s. 20/ Sch. 4, Pt. 1):

Regulator	Rights of audience	Conduct of litigation	Reserved instruments	Probate activities	Notarial activities	Administration of oaths
Law Society	Yes	Yes	Yes	Yes	No	Yes
Bar Council	Yes	Yes	Yes	Yes	No	Yes
Master of the Faculties	No	No	Yes	Yes	Yes	Yes
Chartered Institute of Legal Executives	Yes	Yes	Yes	Yes	No	Yes
Council for Licensed Conveyancers	No	No	Yes	Yes	No	Yes
Chartered Institute of Patent Attorneys	Yes	Yes	Yes	No	No	Yes
Chartered Institute of Trade Mark Attorneys	Yes	Yes	Yes	No	No	Yes
Association of Costs Lawyers	Yes	Yes	No	No	No	Yes
Institute of Chartered Accountants in England and Wales	No	No	No	Yes	No	Yes
Association of Chartered Certified Accountants	No	No	No	Yes	No	No

The Legal Services Board does not have the power to recommend to the Lord Chancellor that he approve further approved regulators (s. 20/ Sch. 4, Pt. 2). The regulatory arrangements of all the approved regulators defined in Sch. 4, Pt. 1 remain in place at the coming into force of the act but thereafter, all changes to internal professional regulatory arrangements must be approved by the board (s. 20/ Sch. 3, Pt. 3). The Institute of Chartered Accountants in England and Wales was added as an approved regulator on 6 April 2020.

== Regulation of approved regulators ==
Approved regulators have a duty to promote the regulatory objectives (s. 28). If they fail to do so, or if they fail in some other way to comply with the Act, the Legal Services Board can:

- Issue directions to the regulator to correct the deficiency (ss. 32-34/ Sch. 7);
- Publish a public censure (ss. 35–36);
- Impose a financial penalty (ss. 37–40);
- Make an intervention direction whereby the regulatory function is performed by a person nominated by the Board (ss. 41–44);
- Recommend that the Lord Chancellor cancel the regulator's approval (ss. 45–48).

The board has a duty to regulate practising fees (s. 51), resolve regulatory conflicts (ss. 52–54), and work with the Competition and Markets Authority and the Lord Chancellor on competition issues (ss. 57–61). These provisions came into force on 1 January 2009 and 1 January 2010.

== Alternative business structures and licensed bodies ==
Before the coming into force of the act, lawyers in England and Wales could only practice as:

- Solicitors, as sole traders or in partnerships with other solicitors;
- Barristers, as sole traders; or
- Employees providing legal services to their employer.

The act allows alternative business structures (ABSs) with non-lawyers in professional, management or ownership roles. This allowed supermarkets to offer legal services. The act creates a system whereby approved regulators can authorise licensed bodies to offer reserved legal services (ss.71–111).

The Solicitors Regulation Authority licensed the first set of ABSs in 2012, including Cooperative Legal Services.

== Complaints ==
Approved regulators must operate a complaints system as part of their internal regulatory arrangements (s. 112). Section 114 of the Act creates an Office for Legal Complaints which the section 115 stipulates must administer an ombudsman scheme (ss. 114–158 /Sch. 15). Section 114 came into force on 7 March 2008.

On 3 February 2009, the Legal Services Board announced the board members for the Office for Legal Complaints and the Office officially launched on 24 July 2009. The new scheme was the Legal Ombudsman, which has exclusive first instance jurisdiction for complaints regarding legal professionals. The Legal Ombudsman began receiving complaints on 6 October 2010.

This scheme replaced the Legal Services Complaints Commissioner and Legal Services Ombudsman, which had been established in the Courts and Legal Services Act 1990 (s. 159). The Office of the Legal Services Complaints Commissioner closed on 31 March 2010. The Office of the Legal Services Ombudsman closed in 2011.

For the purposes of complaints only, claims management services are regarded as reserved legal activities and the Claims Management Services Regulator as an approved regulator (s. 161).

== Legal professional privilege ==
The act extends legal professional privilege to authorised persons other than barristers and solicitors (s. 190). This section came into force in 2010.

== Costs in pro bono proceedings ==
Where a litigant is represented in civil proceedings on a pro bono basis, it would be contrary to the indemnity principle to award costs to that person. Section 194 allows the court to order a payment to a charity in lieu. These provisions came into force progressively from 30 June to 1 October 2008.

== Bibliography ==
- Intendance Research & LPA (2007). Brave New World: Impact of the Legal Services Act 2007. London: Sweet & Maxwell. ISBN 978-1-84703-252-2.
- "Explanatory Notes to Legal Services Act 2007". The National Archives. 2007.
