= General Council of the Bar =

Representative body for barristers in England and Wales

- Founded: 1894; 132 years ago
- Headquarters: 289–293 High Holborn; London, WC1V 7HZ
- Chair: Kirsty Brimelow
- Website: barcouncil.org.uk

The General Council of the Bar, commonly known as the Bar Council, is the representative body for barristers in England and Wales. Established in 1894, the Bar Council is the "approved regulator" of barristers, but delegates its regulatory function to the independent Bar Standards Board. As the lead representative body for barristers in England and Wales, the Bar Council’s work is devoted to ensuring the Bar’s voice is heard, efficiently and effectively, and with the interests of the Bar (and the public interest) as its focus.

== History ==
The General Council of the Bar was created in 1894 to deal with breaches of a barrister's professional standards, something that had previously been handled by the judiciary. Along with the Inns of Court it formed the Senate of the Inns of Court and the Bar in 1974, a union that was broken up on 1 January 1987 following a report by Lord Rawlinson. The Courts and Legal Services Act 1990 designated the Bar Council as the professional body for barristers, with the role as a regulatory body being split off in 2006 to form the Bar Standards Board.

== Committees ==
As part of the representative remit of the Bar Council, it has a number of representative committees. The most senior of these is the Bar Council, which has 56 members representing organisations such as the Circuits and Specialist Bar Associations, and 60 members elected by the wider Bar.

There are a further fourteen committees, including:

- Bar Representation Committee
- Education and Training Committee
- Employed Barristers Committee
- Equality, Diversity, and Social Mobility Committee
- Ethics Committee
- European Committee
- General Management Committee
- International Committee
- Law Reform Committee
- Legal Services Committee
- Pro Bono and Social Responsibility Committee
- Remuneration Committee

== List of chairs ==
- 1891–1899: Herbert Cozens-Hardy
- 1899–1901: Joseph Walton
- 1901–1907: Marshall Warmington
- 1907–c. 1913: William English Harrison
- 1913–18: Paul Ogden Lawrence
- 1918–20: John Alderson Foote
- 1920–31: Sir Thomas Hughes
- 1931–32: E. A. Mitchell-Innes
- 1932–46: Sir Herbert Cunliffe
- 1946–1947: Sir Charles Doughty
- 1947–48: G. O. Slade
- 1948–52: Sir Godfrey Russell Vick
- 1952–57: Hartley Shawcross
- 1957–58: Milner Holland
- 1958–60: Gerald Gardiner
- 1960–62: Geoffrey Lawrence
- 1962–63: Sir Milner Holland
- 1963–66: Joseph Molony
- 1966–68: The Hon H. A. P. Fisher
- 1968–70: Desmond Ackner
- 1970–72: John Arnold
- 1973–74: James Comyn
- 1974–75: Patrick Neill
- 1975–76: Sir Peter Rawlinson
- 1985–86: Robert Alexander
- 1987: Peter Scott
- 1988: Robert Johnson
- 1989: Desmond Fennell
- 1990: Peter Cresswell
- 1991: Anthony Scrivener
- 1992: The Lord Williams of Mostyn
- 1993: John Rowe
- 1994: Robert Seabrook
- 1995: Peter Goldsmith
- 1996: David Penry-Davey
- 1997: Robert Owen
- 1998: Heather Hallett
- 1999: Daniel Brennan
- 2000: Jonathan Hirst
- 2001: Roy Amlot
- 2002: David Bean
- 2003: Matthias Kelly
- 2004: Stephen Irwin
- 2005: Guy Mansfield
- 2006: Stephen Hockman
- 2007: Geoffrey Vos
- 2008: Timothy Dutton
- 2009: Desmond Browne
- 2010: Nicholas Green
- 2011: Peter Lodder
- 2012: Michael Todd
- 2013: Maura McGowan
- 2014: Nicholas Lavender
- 2015: Alistair MacDonald
- 2016: Chantal-Aimée Doerries
- 2017: Andrew Langdon
- 2018: Andrew Walker (commercial lawyer)
- 2019: Richard Atkins
- 2020: Amanda Pinto
- 2021: Derek Sweeting
- 2022: Mark Fenhalls
- 2023: Nick Vineall
- 2024: Sam Townend
- 2025: Barbara Mills
- 2026: Kirsty Brimelow
