= Legal Ombudsman =

- Predecessor: Legal Complaints Service
- Formation: 6 October 2010
- Type: Statutory body
- Headquarters: Birmingham, England
- Services: Free impartial complaint investigation service about lawyers working in England and Wales
- Chief Ombudsman: Paul McFadden
- Chair of Office for Legal Complaints: Elisabeth Davies
- Website: www.legalombudsman.org.uk
- Remarks: Uses specialist mail service based in Slough, England
- Member of Ombudsman Association. The Office for Legal Complaints is responsibile to the Legal Services Board and the Ministry of Justice

The Legal Ombudsman (often informally abbreviated to LeO or LEO) is an ombudsman service that opened on 6 October 2010. It is a free service that investigates complaints about lawyers in England and Wales. The Legal Ombudsman was set up as a result of the Legal Services Act 2007 and took over from the Legal Complaints Service and other legal complaint-handling bodies. The current Chief Ombudsman is Paul McFadden, who replaced Rebecca Marsh in January 2021, Marsh having left the post in the summer of 2020 after being in post since April 2019. The Legal Ombudsman is a member of the Ombudsman Association.

== Governance and jurisdiction ==
Sections 114 and 115 of the Legal Services Act 2007 established the Office for Legal Complaints and stipulated that it must operate an ombudsman scheme. The OLC appointed the first chief ombudsman and acts as the Legal Ombudsman's board. The OLC is responsible to both the Legal Services Board and the Ministry of Justice. The current chair of the OLC is Elisabeth Davies.

The Legal Ombudsman can investigate complaints made by members of the public (and small businesses, clubs and charities) about the service they receive from lawyers working in England and Wales. The following types of lawyers fall within the Legal Ombudsman's jurisdiction:

- costs lawyers
- legal executives
- licensed conveyancers
- notaries public
- patent attorneys
- probate practitioners
- registered European lawyers
- solicitors
- trademark attorneys
- claims management companies (between January 2015 and April 2019).

The Legal Ombudsman's role is restricted to investigating issues around quality of service. Because the Legal Ombudsman is a lay organisation (section 122 (2) of the Legal Services Act does not allow a lawyer to be the Chief Ombudsman), generally, it cannot say whether legal advice is correct or not. The exception is if it appears that the advice is so unreasonable that no other lawyer in the same circumstances would have given it: this is the reasonable or common sense approach.

Similarly, the Legal Ombudsman cannot make decisions on matters of negligence because negligence is a legal concept that must be proved in a court of law. However, it is possible that poor service, which the Legal Ombudsman can investigate, might overlap with evidence that a complainant might wish to use to argue that their lawyer has been negligent. Where there is an overlap, only the courts have the authority to decide what amounts to negligence. The Legal Ombudsman's rules allow it to decline to investigate cases that relate to legal advice or negligence if it thinks that they would be better dealt with by the courts or some other scheme.

Any issues relating to the general conduct of a lawyer will be referred to the appropriate regulating body. For instance, where there is evidence to suggest a solicitor may have been guilty of misconduct, the Legal Ombudsman will refer the matter to the Solicitors Regulation Authority.

Complainants normally have to complain to the lawyer first. Failing this there are two relevant time limits regarding taking a complaint to the Legal Ombudsman: It will accept complaints up to six years from the date of act/omission, or three years from when the complainant should have known about the complaint if later. However, this new limit will be introduced gradually so at the moment the problem must have happened on or after 6 October 2010.

== Impartiality ==
Sections 122(3) and (8) of the Legal Services Act 2007 provide that the Chief Ombudsman must not be a lawyer. In addition, as an arm's-length body, the Legal Ombudsman is not affiliated to lawyers' representative bodies or their regulators. In this respect it differs from the Legal Complaints Service, one of its predecessors.
