= Bar Standards Board =

Regulator of barristers in England and Wales

- Bar Standards Board (City of London)
- Abbreviation: BSB
- Founded: January 1, 2006; 20 years ago
- Headquarters: 289–293 High Holborn; London, WC1V 7HZ
- Chair: Kathryn Stone
- Vice Chair: Andrew Mitchell
- Website: barstandardsboard.org.uk

The Bar Standards Board regulates barristers in England and Wales for the public interest.

It is responsible for:

- Setting standards of conduct for barristers and authorising barristers to practise;
- Monitoring the service provided by barristers to assure quality;
- Setting the education and training requirements for becoming a barrister as well as setting continuing training requirements to ensure that barristers’ skills are maintained throughout their careers; and
- Handling complaints against barristers and taking enforcement or other action where appropriate

The BSB's functions were originally carried out by the General Council of the Bar, the barristers' representative body, until 2006 when the Bar Council created the BSB as an independent regulator. The Legal Services Board has once - in 2013 - questioned the independence of the BSB from the Bar Council.

== Governance ==
The BSB's governing board meets monthly at its headquarters in High Holborn, London, and holds public and private sessions. It has a majority of lay (non-barrister) members and the remainder are barristers. Its chair is Kathryn Stone OBE. The vice-chair is Andrew Mitchell KC. since January 2021. He replaced Naomi Ellenbogen KC who was appointed to the High Court on 2 November 2020.

Members of the BSB's board as of December 2019 are:

Barrister Members: Andrew Mitchell KC, Leslie Thomas KC, Elizabeth Prochaska, Adam Solomon KC and Irena Sabic.

Lay Members: Alison Allden OBE, Steven Haines, Emir Feisal, Kathryn Stone OBE, and Stephen Thornton CBE.

=== List of Chairs ===
No	Image	Chair	Term	Term length	Ref(s)
1	–	Ruth Evans	1 January 2006 – 31 December 2008	2 years, 11 months, and 30 days	
2		Ruth Deech	1 January 2009 – 31 December 2014	5 years, 11 months, and 30 days	
3		Andrew Burns	1 January 2015 – 31 December 2017	2 years, 11 months, and 30 days	
4		Tessa Blackstone	1 January 2018 – 31 August 2022	4 years, 7 months, and 30 days	
5	–	Kathryn Stone	1 September 2022 – Present	4 years and 29 days	

== Activity ==
=== Maintaining standards of conduct ===
The BSB is responsible for setting the standards of conduct at the Bar. This is delivered through the BSB Handbook, the current version of which was released in May 2024.

The BSB Handbook is structured around the Core Duties (Part 2 of the Handbook), which underpin the full regulatory framework. It also has specific rules for certain circumstances. The Handbook outlines the intended regulatory outcomes for the rules.

=== Enforcement ===
The BSB receives approximately 2,000 reports about the conduct of barristers each year. Of these, less than one percent are typically suspended or disbarred.

Reports are categorised according to whether staff members at the BSB can impose an administrative sanction (typically a written warning or up to £1,000 fine) or whether they are required to be passed to the five-person panel of the Independent Decision-making Body. If the barrister agrees and the matter is not serious, the panel can impose a fine, restrictions on their licence to practice, order them to complete ongoing professional development, or they can reprimand them.

If the barrister disputes what happened, or the matter is more serious, the case is passed onto a Disciplinary tribunal. Disciplinary tribunals are arranged by the independent Bar Tribunals and Adjudication Service and can be made up of either three or five people.

=== Education and training ===
The BSB oversees the process to qualify as a barrister. After consultation, it approved four new pathways to qualifying as a barrister: the three-step pathway, the four-step pathway, the integrated pathway, and the apprenticeship pathway. This replaced the Bar Professional Training Course (BPTC) in 2020.

The BSB also oversees the arrangements for transferring lawyers and issues approvals from the Authorisations team to applicants.

The BSB is responsible for assuring competence, which it does through the Professional Statement and through Continuing Professional Development (CPD). There are separate programmes for CPD for new and established practitioners.

=== BSB Entities and Alternative Business Structures ===
The Bar Standards Board also authorise and regulate "BSB entities", which fall into two distinct bodies: BSB authorised bodies (previously referred to as "entities") are fully owned and managed by authorised, such as lawyers with a current practising certificate. BSB licensed bodies (also known as "Alternative Business Structures" or ABSs), however, are owned and managed jointly by both authorised and non-authorised individuals. The Bar Standards Board held a workshop at the 2016 Annual Bar Conference, and authorised the first three Licensed Bodies in April 2017, including VII Law, Minerva Law and ShenSmith Law. Licensed bodies have been reported by Thomson Reuters as a leading innovation of the legal industry.

== Criticism ==
=== Withdrawal from Legal Choices ===
In 2019, the BSB announced it would be withdrawing from Legal Choices, a consumer-facing website designed to help the public to access information about legal issues and legal advisers. The Legal Services Board criticised the BSB's decision, suggesting that regulators needed to do more to help consumers to understand legal services and compare providers.

=== Handling of BPTC exams during the COVID-19 pandemic ===
During the COVID-19 pandemic, the BSB postponed the April sitting of the centralised assessments for the BPTC. It announced that Pearson VUE would deliver the exams remotely in August. A small number of exams could be sat in physical centres where reasonable adjustments were required.

Students alleged that the proposals were discriminatory against those with caring responsibilities, living in noisy houses or with poor internet connection, those menstruating, or those who required breaks. They also claimed that international students in different time zones would be negatively affected. They therefore called for the exams to be delivered as open book. After the BSB responded, students also suggested that the arrangements were not suitable for those shielding from COVID-19.

Pearson VUE also had extremely strict anti-cheating protocols, meaning that if another person was detected in any way, the exam would be terminated with no score given.

During the exams, they were hit with a wide range of technical problems, such as exams being terminated without a reason given or loss of internet connection. Students were also unable to take a break for any reason, leading to several students urinating in receptacles while still sitting their exams.

The BSB apologised to students and appointed an independent review, led by Professor Rebecca Huxley-Binns. The review concluded that the BSB had made the correct decision to cancel the April exams and take on the arrangements of the August exams, and the correct decision to use Pearson VUE to deliver online exams, either at home or in a test centre. However, the review also concluded that the closed book format and the decision not to allow breaks both contributed to the outcomes. Finally, the review suggested that the statistical analysis provided by Pearson VUE about how many examinations had been successfully delivered was not reliable.

=== Handling of complaint against Dinah Rose KC ===
In 2022, the Bar Standards Board apologised to Dinah Rose KC for making a statement about how it handled a complaint against her.

Rose had acted for the Cayman Islands government before the Privy Council, arguing that the Caribbean islands’ constitution did not give same-sex couples the right to marry. A complaint was made against her, and the BSB responded to the complainant that “As a senior barrister she could be expected to be aware of the cab-rank rule and its operation in practice. Taking this at its highest, this might possibly amount to evidence of recklessness.” Rose had not been given the opportunity to respond to the complaint.

The BSB later clarified that no regulatory action had been taken against Rose, and that she had been correct to act in accordance with the cab-rank rule.

== See also ==
- Barristers in England and Wales
- General Council of the Bar
- Solicitors Regulation Authority
