= Solicitors Regulation Authority =

Regulatory body for solicitors in England and Wales

- Abbreviation: SRA
- Founded: January 29, 2007; 19 years ago
- Type: Regulatory body
- Headquarters: The Cube, Birmingham, England
- Region served: England and Wales
- Chief Executive: Sarah Rapson
- Staff: 783
- Website: sra.org.uk

The Solicitors Regulation Authority (SRA) is the regulatory body for solicitors in England and Wales.

It is responsible for regulating the professional conduct of more than 125,000 solicitors and other authorised individuals at more than 11,000 firms, as well as those working in-house at private and public sector organisations.

The SRA, based in Birmingham with offices in London and Cardiff, is led operationally by a Chief Executive and Senior Management Team, with a Board and Board Sub-Committees providing strategic direction.

The SRA was formed in January 2007 by the Legal Services Act 2007 to act as the independent regulator of solicitors. While formerly an arm of the Law Society, the SRA is a statutory creation and operationally independent of the Law Society. In a report by Sir David Clementi of all legal services in England and Wales, he recommended that professional bodies holding both regulatory and representative responsibilities should separate those roles. The government adopted this recommendation.

The Law Society remains the representative body for solicitors.

Since 2023 the SRA has been beset by problems including damning reports into its handling of the collapsed firms Axiom Ince and SSB Law, expensive costs orders for failed prosecutions, an announcement in 2026 that fees would have to rise significantly, and a formal censure by the Legal Services Board. Approximately £103.5m of client money has gone missing or been misappropriated following the collapses of Axiom Ince in 2023 and PM Law in 2026.

== Background ==
The profession of solicitor has been self-regulated for centuries. The Law Society acquired its first Royal Charter in 1831 and the new Charter in 1845 defined the Society as an independent, private body servicing the affairs of the profession like other professional, literary and scientific bodies. In 1834, the Society first initiated proceedings against dishonest practitioners. By 1907, the Society possessed a statutory disciplinary committee, and was empowered to investigate solicitors' accounts and to issue annual practising certificates. In 1983, the Society established the Office for the Supervision of Solicitors to deal with complaints about solicitors.

Following the Clementi review, the SRA was formed as a Board of The Law Society, but it regulates and enforces regulation completely independently of the Law Society. The Law Society remains the approved regulator, although following the Legal Services Act 2007 a new body, the Legal Services Board (chaired by Sir Michael Pitt, a government appointee) oversees all the approved regulators including the Bar Council, which has also divested its regulatory functions into the Bar Standards Board.

== Function ==
The SRA regulates solicitors, other authorised professionals and the firms they work in throughout England and Wales. Scotland and Northern Ireland are separate legal jurisdictions and have their own regulatory regimes.

A solicitor is someone who carries out specific legal activities, having undergone specialist studies and training. These specific services are called reserved legal activities. In England and Wales, the current reserved legal activities are:

- Administration of oaths
- Advocacy
- Conveyancing
- Litigation
- Notary
- Probate

There are other regulators within England and Wales, who regulate other providers of legal services. The Bar Standards Board regulates barristers, for example, while the other regulators are:

- CILEx
- Notaries
- Council for Licensed Conveyancers
- Intellectual Property Regulation Board
- Costs Lawyer Standards Board

All regulators report to the overarching Legal Services Board. Regulatory work is designed to ensure all work in legal services achieves the eight regulatory outcomes.

These are:

- protecting and promoting the public interest
- supporting the constitutional principle of the rule of law
- improving access to justice
- protecting and promoting the interests of consumers
- promoting competition in the provision of services in the legal sector
- encouraging an independent, strong, diverse and effective legal profession
- increasing public understanding of citizens legal rights and duties
- promoting and maintaining adherence to the professional principles of independence and integrity; proper standards of work; observing the best interests of the client and the duty to the court; and maintaining client confidentiality

The SRA carries out its function by:

- Creating and maintaining the Solicitors Handbook including the Code of Conduct, which contains the ethical principles that guide solicitors in their work
- Authorising those that want to work in the profession, including the annual renewal of Practising Certificates that represent a solicitor’s licence to practise
- Authorising the firms within which individuals carry out reserved legal activities
- Supervising firms and individuals to ensure they adhere to professional standards
- Taking enforcement action against those that have breached the code of conduct, to create an effective deterrent and discourage further wrongdoing in the profession. A range of sanctions are available to the SRA, including prosecuting more severe cases at the Solicitors Disciplinary Tribunal
- Monitoring the quality of training both for those entering the profession and to further increase the standard of those practising within it

=== Regulating in the public interest ===
The SRA regulates firms and individuals in the public interest. This means setting the minimum professional standards that solicitors should adhere to so their clients - as consumers - get the service they expect. When these standards are not met, professional sanctions are taken to act as a deterrent.

However, the SRA is not a prescribed person or statutory regulator for the purposes of the Public Interest Disclosure Act 1998 (for whistleblowing purposes).

What regulating in the public interest does not mean, however, is acting as means of recourse for individuals that are unhappy with the actions of their solicitor or firm. While the SRA will deal with complaints brought to it by dissatisfied clients as necessary, it does not offer a compensation scheme. This can be achieved through the Legal Ombudsman.

== Activity ==
=== Enforcement ===
In 2012, the SRA's Supervision function handled a total of 6,289 issues, while the Forensic Investigations Unit began work on 530 new cases.

The number of interventions, which involves the SRA closing down a firm because it poses risks to clients, was 37. The number of referrals to the Solicitors Disciplinary Tribunal was 289, which resulted in 77 strike-offs, 94 fines and 56 suspensions, among other sanctions.

The Solicitors Compensation Fund accepted 1,321 claims and paid out £18.54 million for those which were successful.

Further information on the SRA's enforcement activity can be found on its Reports and Research pages

=== Outcomes-focused regulation ===
In 2011, the SRA moved from a rules-based tick-box approach to regulation and introduced an outcomes-focused regime. This involved creating a whole new Handbook to create a regulatory framework in which law firms could deliver the best outcomes for their clients using a business model adapted specifically for their situation.

Research conducted at the end of 2012 showed that while the number of firms comfortable with the concept of outcomes-focused regulation had increased, the SRA still had work to do to demonstrate the flexibilities offered by the new way of working.

=== Alternative business structures ===
The Legal Services Act also allowed for law firms to adopt management models that moved away from the traditional all-partner model. Alternative Business Structures (ABSs) were introduced on 6 October 2011, and the SRA began accepting applications for licences on 3 January 2012. The first licences were awarded on 28 March 2012.

=== Legal education and training review ===
The SRA, in conjunction with the BSB and IPS, has delivered the Legal Education Training Review (LETR), the most comprehensive study on training for legal services in a generation. Each of the regulators will be producing their own response to the findings of the review.

=== Referral fees in personal injury cases ===
As part of the Legal Aid, Sentencing and Punishment of Offenders Act 2012, the Government introduced a ban on the payment of referral fees in personal injury cases. Solicitors could no longer pay firms that passed them details of those who had suffered injuries as the Government felt this played a significant part in creating and maintaining the alleged compensation culture. The SRA was tasked with drawing up the rules to outlaw the payments and police the profession in conjunction with the Ministry of Justice and Financial Conduct Authority.

Despite the ban on referral fees, the practice of Claims Management Companies introducing injured clients to solicitors in exchange for a fee remains prevalent in the UK.

A matter of concern with regards to solicitors making payments in exchange for these introductions is the fact that, in many cases, the fee paid is in excess of the costs a solicitor can be paid by the losing party for the work done on some claims. This inevitability of this is that a solicitor must take up the option of deducting up to 25% from the customers compensation in order to cover costs and maintain profitability.

It is of note that the initial ability of solicitors to claim referral fees in personal injury cases was itself introduced by Government in order the ameliorate the effect of removal of access to Legal Aid for personal injury claims.

=== Financial stability ===
The Great Recession affected the legal sector in the same way that it affected all others. While some firms found new ways of working or cut their cloth accordingly, others failed to adapt to tighter financial constraints. This was brought into focus early in 2013 with a number of high-profile failures at large practices. The SRA started a programme of work to discover how deeply the financial difficulties lie, and help firms in trouble.

=== News International ===
In July 2011 the SRA announced that it would be launching a formal inquiry into the role played by solicitors in the News International phone hacking scandal. The SRA confirmed that its investigation would consider the concerns of Labour MP Tom Watson, who had called upon the SRA to investigate News International's former legal adviser Harbottle & Lewis.

== Concerns ==
In August 2023, the SRA was fined £75,000 by the Solicitors Disciplinary Tribunal for bringing a speculative prosecution against a solicitor without a proper basis in law. The SDT further found that the SRA had delayed inordinately in bringing the case.

In October 2024, an investigation conducted by Carson McDowell LLP concluded that the SRA failed to act adequately, effectively and efficiently with regard to its investigation of Axiom Ince, a law firm which subsequently collapsed in 2023, with the loss of 1,400 jobs and over £60 million in client money. Insurance contributions on solicitors firms have risen by 270% to meet the costs of the resulting shortfall. The LSB confirmed that it would initiate enforcement action against the SRA to ensure that the SRA learn appropriate lessons from this grotesque incompetence, and that such a disaster will never be repeated. The SRA's chair and chief executive, Anna Bradley and Paul Philip respectively, each refused to accept the outcome of the independent investigation. Accordingly, pressure grew on these individuals to resign. Philip duly announced his resignation in February 2025.

Revelations of further incompetence swiftly followed. In October 2025, it was revealed that, for five years, the SRA had ignored red flags concerning the failed firm SSB Law. Following the same, the Government announced that it was stripping the SRA of its ability to regulate AML enforcement, since its competence could no longer be trusted. Bradley continued to resist calls that she take accountability for these failures and resign. In March 2026, the LSB formally censured the SRA for its handling of the collapse of SSB Law, just the second time such a sanction has been issued.

On 2 February 2026, Sheffield-based law firm PM Law Ltd suddenly collapsed in what the SRA described as a "sophisticated suspected fraud" involving the "improper removal and misuse" of £39.5m of client funds. On 6 May, the LSB ordered the SRA to explain how it allowed up to £40m of client money to go missing, and to commission an independent external audit to evaluate its compliance with LSB directions as to how it has improved its risk assessment of firms and safeguarding of client money following the 2023 collapse of Axiom Ince.

== Drink-driving penalties ==
In 2023, the SRA decided to take account of income when issuing fines against firms and individuals. In separate cases in January 2024, two solicitors were fined by the SRA after being convicted of drink-driving. The court disqualified Piers King of Farrer & Co from driving for 22 months and ordered him to pay a nearly £2,000 fine: the SRA then fined King an additional £10,105.44 plus £300 costs, the SRA's guidance having indicated that the penalty should be 16-49% of King's annual gross income. Richard Lunn, a director of Lincolnshire firm Haywood Lunn and Allen Ltd, was convicted of drink-driving in November 2022: the court disqualified him from driving for 19 months, reduced by 19 weeks if he completed a driver rehabilitation course, and imposed a fine of £437 plus £85 of costs. The SRA subsequently fined Lunn an additional £13,836 - some 31 times higher than the financial penalty issued by the court - plus £1,350 of costs. In another similar case a few months later, the SRA merely rebuked a solicitor for drink-driving rather than issuing a fine.

Amid a backlash from the profession and accusations of double jeopardy, with solicitors and members of the public arguing that solicitors should not face higher or additional fines from the SRA given that the criminal justice system had already imposed a penalty, on 11 May 2025 the SRA revealed that in April it had approved a rule change to stop imposing financial penalties for offences relating to drink-driving, except in 'exceptional circumstances'. The SRA changed its published enforcement strategy in respect of solicitors convicted of drink-driving on 30 June 2025.

== See also ==
- Law Society of England and Wales
- Legal Complaints Service
