= Bill of costs =

A bill of costs is an itemized list of expenses a prevailing party in a lawsuit or action needs to pay for services procured from a lawyer. It can have varying levels of detail and should describe the nature of the work done by the lawyer for the client, and any other expenses incurred. Recoverable costs vary by jurisdiction but often include copying fees, filing fees, travel expenses, court reporter fees, and electronic legal research costs.

In some cases, particularly those in which attorney's fees are part of the relief demanded by the plaintiff, a bill of costs may be submitted to the court, to determine how much of the prevailing party's costs the losing party must pay.
