= Office for Legal Complaints =

The Office for Legal Complaints (OLC) is the board of the Legal Ombudsman, the free service that investigates complaints about lawyers in England and Wales.

The OLC was established by the Legal Services Act 2007. The Legal Services Board, a non-departmental public body of the Ministry of Justice, appoints the OLC's members.

== Objectives ==
The OLC ensures that they and the Legal Ombudsman promote the regulatory objectives set out in the Act, which are:

- protecting and promoting the public interest;
- supporting the constitutional principle of law;
- improving access to justice;
- protecting and promoting the interests of consumers;
- promoting competition in the provision of services;
- encouraging an independent, strong, diverse and effective legal profession;
- increasing public understanding of the citizen's legal rights and duties; and
- promoting and maintaining adherence to the professional principles

== Members ==
The OLC has eight members, including Steve Green, the chair. It meets regularly and has created three committees to help it fulfil its role. The first is the Audit and Risk Committee, which is responsible for overseeing the Legal Ombudsman's risk management processes, governance and financial control framework. The second is the Remuneration and Nomination Committee, which is responsible for overseeing, among other things, the terms of employment of Legal Ombudsman staff. The third is the Category 1 Publications Committee, which oversees the approval process to publish details where the OLC has identified a serious risk to the public from a particular legal service provider.

=== Previous members ===
Previous OLC members included:

- Elizabeth France Chair from 2009 - 2014;
- Margaret Doyle;
- Mary Seneviratne;
- Brian Woods-Scawen;
