= Courts and Legal Services Act 1990 =

Act of the Parliament of the United Kingdom

Courts and Legal Services Act 1990 (Note: Section 125(1).)
- Act of Parliament
- Parliament of the United Kingdom
- Long title: An Act to make provision with respect to the procedure in, and allocation of business between, the High Court and other courts; to make provision with respect to legal services; to establish a body to be known as the Lord Chancellor's Advisory Committee on Legal Education and Conduct and a body to be known as the Authorised Conveyancing Practitioners Board; to provide for the appointment of a legal services ombudsman; to make provision for the establishment of a conveyancing ombudsman scheme; to provide for the establishment of conveyancing appeal tribunals; to amend the law relating to judicial and related pensions and judicial and other appointments; to make provision with respect to certain officers of the Supreme Court; to amend the Solicitors Act 1974; to amend the Arbitration Act 1950; to amend the law relating to the limitation of actions; to make provision with respect to certain loans in respect of residential property; to amend the Children Act 1989 and make further provision in connection with that Act; and for connected purposes.
- Citation: 1990 c. 41
- Introduced by: The Earl of Strathmore and Kinghorne (Lords)
- Territorial extent: England and Wales; Scotland (in part); Northern Ireland (in part); (Note: Section 123.)

Dates
- Royal assent: 1 November 1990
- Commencement: various (Note: Section 124.)
Other legislation
| Amends | Ecclesiastical Licences Act 1533; Arbitration Act 1950; Administration of Justice Act 1956; Agricultural Marketing Act 1958; Law Commissions Act 1965; Administration of Justice Act 1970; Attachment of Earnings Act 1971; Misuse of Drugs Act 1971; Solicitors Act 1974; Industry Act 1975; Restrictive Trade Practices Act 1976; Insurance Brokers (Registration) Act 1977; Domestic Proceedings and Magistrates' Courts Act 1978; Judicial Pensions Act 1981; County Courts Act 1984; Interception of Communications Act 1985; Children Act 1989 |
| Repeals/revokes | Public Notaries Act 1833; Small Debts Act 1845; Barristers (Qualification for Office) Act 1961 |
| Amended by | List: Social Security (Consequential Provisions) Act 1992; Tribunals and Inquiries Act 1992; Pension Schemes Act 1993; Pension Schemes (Northern Ireland) Act 1993; Charities Act 1993; Value Added Tax Act 1994; Police and Magistrates' Courts Act 1994; Insurance Companies (Third Insurance Directives) Regulations 1994; Community Charges (Administration and Enforcement) (Amendment) Regulations 1995; Merchant Shipping Act 1995; Police Act 1996; Arbitration Act 1996; Family Law Act 1996; Civil Procedure Act 1997; Nurses, Midwives and Health Visitors Act 1997; Justices of the Peace Act 1997; Plant Varieties Act 1997; Employment Rights (Dispute Resolution) Act 1998; Bank of England Act 1998; Data Protection Act 1998; Access to Justice Act 1999; Immigration and Asylum Act 1999; Competition Act 1998 (Competition Commission) Transitional, Consequential and Supplemental Provisions Order 1999; Civil Procedure (Modification of Enactments) Order 1999; Child Support, Pensions and Social Security Act 2000; Armed Forces Act 2001; Land Registration Act 2002; Justice (Northern Ireland) Act 2002; Adoption and Children Act 2002; Enterprise Act 2002; Nationality, Immigration and Asylum Act 2002; Communications Act 2003; Courts Act 2003; Health and Social Care (Community Health and Standards) Act 2003; Criminal Justice Act 2003; Enterprise Act 2002 (Consequential and Supplemental Provisions) Order 2003; Secretary of State for Constitutional Affairs Order 2003; Statute Law (Repeals) Act 2004; Asylum and Immigration (Treatment of Claimants, etc.) Act 2004; Civil Partnership Act 2004; Pensions Act 2004; Constitutional Reform Act 2005; Mental Capacity Act 2005; Inquiries Act 2005; Gambling Act 2005; Transfer of Functions (Lord Chancellor and Secretary of State) Order 2005; Commons Act 2006; Charities Act 2006; Armed Forces Act 2006; Tribunals, Courts and Enforcement Act 2007; Forced Marriage (Civil Protection) Act 2007; Legal Services Act 2007; Health and Social Care Act 2008; Planning Act 2008; Companies Act 2006 (Consequential Amendments etc) Order 2008; Consumer Protection from Unfair Trading Regulations 2008; Coroners and Justice Act 2009; Transfer of Tribunal Functions and Revenue and Customs Appeals Order 2009; Licensed Conveyancers (Compensation for Inadequate Professional Services) Order 2009; Transfer of Tribunal Functions (Lands Tribunal and Miscellaneous Amendments) Order 2009; Registered Foreign Lawyers Order 2009; Transfer of Functions of the Charity Tribunal Order 2009; Companies Act 2006 (Consequential Amendments, Transitional Provisions and Savings) Order 2009; Transfer of Functions of the Asylum and Immigration Tribunal Order 2010; Transfer of Tribunal Functions Order 2010; Children, Schools and Families Act 2010; Charities Act 2011; Legal Aid, Sentencing and Punishment of Offenders Act 2012; Public Bodies (Abolition of Crown Court Rule Committee and Magistrates' Courts Rule Committee) Order 2012; Crime and Courts Act 2013; Public Bodies (Abolition of the Aircraft and Shipbuilding Industries Arbitration Tribunal) Order 2013; Financial Services and Markets Act 2000 (Regulated Activities) (Amendment) (No.2) Order 2013; Crime and Courts Act 2013 (Family Court: Consequential Provision) Order 2014; Serious Crime Act 2015; Consumer Rights Act 2015; Deregulation Act 2015; Alteration of Judicial Titles (Registrar in Bankruptcy of the High Court) Order 2018; Financial Services and Markets Act 2000 (Claims Management Activity) Order 2018; Domestic Abuse Act 2021 |
| Relates to | Administration of Justice Act 1985 |

Status: Amended

Text of statute as originally enacted

Revised text of statute as amended

Text of the Courts and Legal Services Act 1990 as in force today (including any amendments) within the United Kingdom, from legislation.gov.uk.

The Courts and Legal Services Act 1990 (c. 41) is an act of the Parliament of the United Kingdom that reformed the legal profession and courts of England and Wales. The act was the culmination of a series of reports and reforms that started with the Benson Commission in the 1970s, and significantly changed the way that the legal profession and court system worked.

The changes introduced in the act covered a variety of areas. Important changes were made to the judiciary, particularly in terms of appointments, judicial pensions and the introduction of district judges, the arbitration process of Alternative Dispute Resolution and the procedure in the courts, particularly in terms of the distribution of civil business between the High Court and the county courts.

The most significant changes were made in the way the legal profession was organised and regulated. The act broke the monopoly solicitors held on conveyancing work, creating an Authorised Conveyancing Practitioners Board which could certify "any individual, corporation or employee of a corporation" as an authorised conveyancer subject to certain requirements. The act also broke the monopoly the Bar held on advocacy and litigation in the higher courts by granting solicitors rights of audience in the Crown Court, High Court, Court of Appeal, Court of Session, Judicial Committee of the Privy Council, and House of Lords if they qualify as solicitor advocates.

The act also made many minor changes to areas as varied as family law, criminal prosecutions and the distribution of costs in civil cases. The act has been called "[one of] the great reforming statutes of the twentieth century" and "one of the most important pieces of legislation affecting the delivery of legal services since 1949".

== Background and previous attempts at reform ==
=== Benson Commission ===
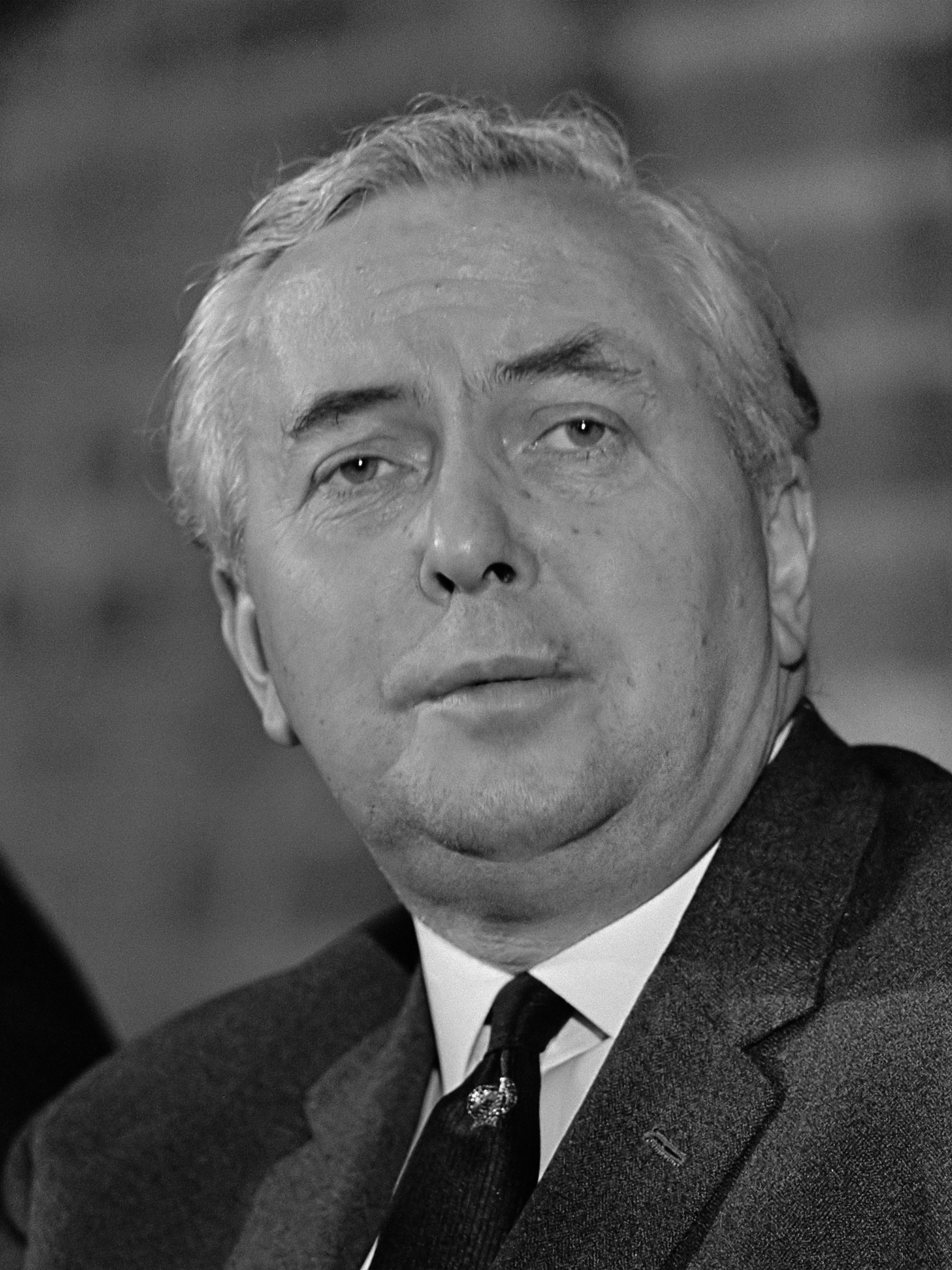
Harold Wilson, whose Labour government created the Royal Commission on Legal Services

During the 1960s the legal profession (barristers, solicitors, and certificated notaries) came under fire for what was perceived to be poor performance, the high cost of conveyancing, and its failure to deal with the needs of all levels of society. In response, the Labour government under Harold Wilson created a Royal Commission on Legal Services, known as the Benson Commission (after its chairman Sir Henry Benson), which was asked to "examine the structure, organisation, training and regulation of the legal profession and to recommend those changes that would be desirable to the interests of justice".

The Commission frightened the legal profession, which believed that they were likely to face severe structural changes and lose their monopolies on probate work and conveyancing work. Their fears were unfounded, however—when the report was published in 1979 it did not propose any radical changes, with one editorial describing it as "characterised by an over-anxiety not to offend the professional establishment". In particular it ruled out the possibility of partnerships between barristers, upheld the idea of a split profession (one with both solicitors and barristers, in contrast to a fused profession) and also rejected the suggestion to allow solicitors rights of audience in the High Court. The report concluded that the practice of law was a profession, and that a profession had to be independent of government, because without independence the interests of a client cannot be a primary consideration. As such, since the legal profession regulated itself through organisations such as the Law Society and Bar Council, it was best if it stayed independent of government interference. The Commission did recommend an examination of the court and legal procedures to see if time and money could be saved for the parties involved.

The government response to the Benson Committee's report was published in 1983, and established a Civil Justice Review to examine court procedure. The report of the review board was put before the House of Commons on 7 June 1988,

=== Glanville Davies affair ===
Despite this brief respite, a series of events in the 1980s helped spur a period of dramatic change in the legal profession that culminated in the Courts and Legal Services Act. The Glanville Davies affair in 1982 highlighted severe problems in the way solicitors regulated themselves. Leslie Parsons filed a complaint against his solicitor, Glanville Davies, a respected solicitor and member of the Council of the Law Society of England and Wales, the solicitors' professional body. Davies had charged Parsons £197,000 for legal services, a "grossly inflated and inaccurate legal bill" which was reduced to £67,000 without Davies complaining. Despite this the Law Society took no disciplinary action, allowing Davies to resign from the council on grounds of ill-health with his reputation intact.

An investigation by the Lay Observer and the Law Society itself (which became known as the Ely Report) highlighted "an appalling catalogue of errors, insensitivity and poor judgment" in the handling of the Davies Affair by the Law Society internal disciplinary organisation, with "administrative failures, wrong decisions, mistakes, errors of judgement, failures in communication and insensitivity... the whole affair was a disgrace to the Society". The society paid compensation to Parsons for their mishandling of the situation, and said that they would compensate victims of similar cases where they had failed to investigate complaints with reasonable care.

As a result of this and similar controversies, Alf Dubs introduced a private member's bill to move the responsibility of regulating the solicitors profession to a body outside the Law Society. After pressure from the Law Society and several of the larger regional societies, the reforms were toned down, and the final proposal (which was implemented on 31 August 1986) kept the responsibility of regulating the solicitors' profession within the Law Society but increased the separation of functions within the society and required that the majority of the people on regulatory committees be lay people (not solicitors).

=== Loss of conveyancing monopoly ===
The next major reform was the loss of the conveyancing monopoly. Before 1983, only solicitors had been authorised to take part in conveyancing work—for anyone else to draft documents relating to the transfer of property was a statutory offence. In December 1983 Austin Mitchell, a Labour Member of Parliament who had been one of the initial supporters of Alf Dubs' private member's bill introduced a private member's bill of his own called the House Buyers Bill. This aimed to remove the restrictions on conveyancing, and although the government opposed it they made it clear that they planned to allow banks and building societies to carry out conveyancing for their customers, and would also be prepared to allow non-solicitors with suitable qualifications to carry out conveyancing work as well.

After negotiations with the government, Mitchell withdrew his bill in exchange for a guarantee that the government would allow non-solicitors to undertake conveyancing work once a committee had set out proposals for protecting consumers who used these new conveyancers against losses. The committee, known as the Farrand Committee (after its chairman, Julian Farrand), finished its report in September 1984. The government almost immediately changed the rules to allow for licensed conveyancers, introducing the changes with a section in the Administration of Justice Act 1985. Despite worries that this would bankrupt solicitors who specialised in conveyancing work, very few licensed conveyancers began practising due to the difficulties in qualifying, and although the field has become more competitive there has been no substantial loss of revenue like that feared.

Solicitors were more scared by the proposal that banks would be allowed to offer conveyancing services, but this suggestion eventually came to nothing. The government introduced a consultation paper on the subject in April 1984, but in December 1985 announced that it "was not satisfied that lending institutions could safely be permitted to offer both conveyancing and a loan in the same transaction. It is therefore proposed to prohibit the institutions from providing conveyancing, either directly or through a subsidiary company in which they hold a majority stake, to those who are also borrowing from them". This essentially killed the proposal (a framework which would allow banks to undertake conveyancing work was included in the Building Societies Act 1986 but never implemented) because the banks had no interest in lending only to people who were not also engaged in a loan agreement with them. It was well known at the time that many members of the cabinet were happy with the initial proposal, but that Lord Hailsham was determined not to let it pass and forced the government to go against its earlier suggestion.

=== Marre Committee ===
Following the loss of their conveyancing monopoly, solicitors turned to the barrister's monopoly on rights of audience and attempted to have it removed. In March 1984 the Council of the Law Society of England and Wales attempted to press for full rights of audience for solicitors, something the Bar was heavily opposed to. The dispute came to the attention of the public when Cyril Smith's solicitor asked to read out a statement settling a libel action in the High Court—he was refused, both at the High Court and the Court of Appeal, although a practice statement issued by the Court of Appeal in 1986 indicated that they felt solicitors should be allowed to appear in front of the High Court and Court of appeal in formal proceedings.

A public debate followed, with the result being that a joint committee between the Law Society and the Bar was formed to discuss the future of the legal profession. Known as the Marre Committee after its chairwoman, Mary Marre, The committee was established in April 1986 and made its report in July 1988. The committee had not been a successful one—the result was split, with the solicitor members and six of the seven independent members recommending the extension of solicitors' rights of audience to the Crown Court, with the Bar representatives and one independent member disagreeing and attaching a Note of Dissent to the final report that undermined its conclusions.

== Formation of the act ==
When the Conservative government was re-elected in 1987 it announced that it would produce a set of green papers on the work and organisation of the legal profession. These papers formed the basis of a large part of the Courts and Legal Services Act 1990.

=== Green papers ===
The three green papers were published by Lord Mackay in January 1989, and were titled The Work and Organisation of the Legal Profession, Conveyancing by Authorised Practitioners and Contingency Fees. The Work and Organisation of the Legal Profession was the main paper, and stated that the overall government objective was to ensure that:

"'the market providing legal services operates freely and efficiently so as to give clients the widest possible choice of cost effective services; and the public can be certain that those services are being supplied by people who have the necessary expertise to provide a service in the area in question... [we believe] free competition between the providers of legal services will, through the discipline of the market, ensure that the public is provided with the most efficient network of legal services at the most economical prices, although the Government also believes that the public must also be assured of the competence of the providers of those services"

The green papers had several main features, the first of which was describing the new role of the Lord Chancellor's Advisory Committee on Legal Education, which was to be expanded to cover matters of professional conduct as well, and be renamed the Lord Chancellor's Advisory Committee on Legal Education and Conduct (ACLEC). The committee would have fifteen members, all appointed by the Lord Chancellor, and would be tasked with commenting on lawyers' education, training and codes of conduct. The Advisory Committee would also advise the Lord Chancellor on which bodies should be allowed to grant rights of audience to their members.

The second main feature was for rights of audience. Mackay proposed that all lawyers, whether barristers or solicitors, should require a certificate of competence to work in the higher courts, while their initial professional qualifications would allow them to practice in the lower courts. This proposal allowed solicitors to gain full rights of audience up to the House of Lords with the appropriate certification, and was widely disliked by barristers and judges. The idea that barristers would not automatically have rights of audience also irritated them, and the idea that the Lord Chancellor would be responsible for defining which bodies could grant these certificates undermined the principle that the legal profession should be independent from the Government.

In terms of conveyancing, the green paper proposed that the framework in the Building Societies Act would be repealed, and replaced by a system of authorised practitioners, where any person, partnership or corporate body could provide conveyancing services if they met certain standards. The authorised practitioners would have a professional code of conduct, and would be supervised by a certain number of licensed conveyancers and solicitors. The draft code of conduct had several flaws, however—it allowed practitioners to act for both parties in a transaction, causing issues with conflicts of interest, and failed to take into account the problems caused by banks and estate agents, who had interests in the housing market, being allowed to act as conveyancers.

Several different parties responded to the green papers; the judiciary published The Green Papers: The Judges' Response, the Bar published Quality of Justice: The Bar's Response and the Law Society published Striking the Balance: The Final Response of the Council of the Law Society on the Green Papers. The response to the green papers was overwhelmingly negative, both in these published opinions and generally—the consultation period was extended for a month due to disagreements with the judiciary, and an all-day debate in the House of Lords on 7 April 1989 produced an "overwhelmingly hostile response".

=== White paper ===
As a result of the House of Lords debate and the other criticism the green papers faced, the Lord Chancellor published a white paper between the green papers and the introduction of a bill to Parliament. The paper (Legal Services: A Framework for the Future) was published in July 1989, and had a different tone to that of the green papers, referring more to the requirement of legal services to be responsive to the needs of the client rather than the discipline of the market and problems with competition between branches of the legal profession. The white paper was divided into four sections:

1. Investigating the conduct of litigation, conveyancing and probate and the possibility of wider choice in legal services.
2. Maintaining the quality of services provided by the legal profession
3. New ways of working, such as multi-national and multi-disciplinary partnerships
4. Judicial appointments.

The white paper allowed for extended rights of audience for both solicitors and any newly created legal disciplines, and also allowed that for certain types of cases, particularly in the county courts, there would be no limits on who could work as an advocate. All barristers would be allowed full rights of audience as soon as they completed pupillage, as long as they comply with the code of conduct set out by the Bar.

The Law Society would be recognised under the act as having the authority to declare a solicitor qualified to practice in a particular court, and solicitors would be recognised as soon as they finished their training contract as having rights of audience in the lower courts. The monopoly on starting and conducting litigation would also be removed, allowing any recognised legal authority to certify its members as fit to work as an advocate.

=== Passage through Parliament ===
The first draft of the bill was printed on 6 December 1989, and consisted of 87 sections and 13 schedules spread over 115 pages. By the time the bill passed this had been extended to 125 sections and 20 schedules spread over 201 pages, mostly due to the discovery of how complex the required reforms would really be. The bill was introduced in the House of Lords on 6 December 1989 by Lord Strathmore.

Several proposed clauses were debated in great detail, but failed to be included in the final act. Lord Mishcon suggested that the Lord Chancellor should be required to "ensure that reasonable standards are set" for the courts service, the aim being to avoid delays and unnecessary expense. Lord Rawlinson made two proposals—firstly, to abolish the judicial functions of the Lord Chancellor (something that was later included in the Constitutional Reform Act 2005), and secondly to establish a Judicial Appointments Commission to examine judicial appointments for government interference. Austin Mitchell proposed the abolition of QCs and the establishment of a legal services commission.

After the bill's introduction in Parliament on 6 December 1989 it was debated by the House of Lords until 18 April 1990. On 8 May 1990 it moved to the House of Commons, where it stayed until 26 October, when it was passed. The bill received the Royal Assent on 1 November 1990.

== Provisions of the act ==
The final version of the act was divided into six sections:

- Part I: procedure in civil courts
- Part II: legal services
- Part III: judicial and other offices and judicial pensions
- Part IV: solicitors
- Part V: arbitration
- Part VI: miscellaneous and supplemental.

=== Part I: Procedure in civil courts ===
Part I of the act made several changes to the procedure used in civil courts, namely the High Court and the county courts.

==== Allocation of business and case procedures ====
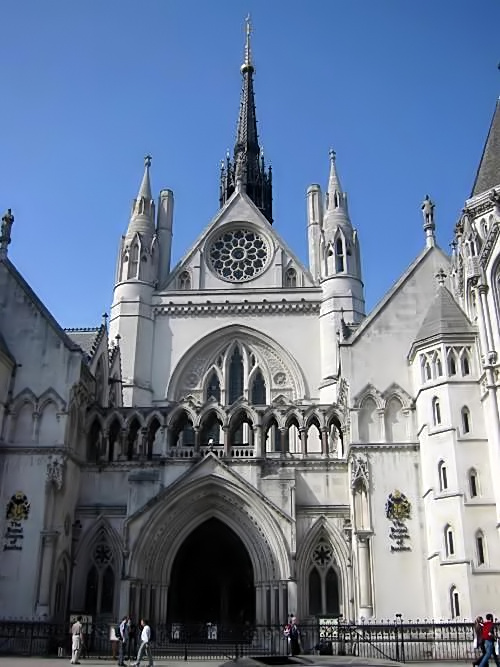
The Royal Courts of Justice, where the main part of the High Court is located

Almost all civil work is dealt with by either the High Court or the County Court. Prior to the act, there was a simple financial boundary to decide which cases would go to which court—any contract or tort case valued at less than £5,000 would go to the county courts, while any case valued at more than that would go straight to the High Court. Section 1 of the act allows the Lord Chancellor to change the financial boundaries after consultation with senior judges such as the Lord Chief Justice and the Master of the Rolls, and also allows the Lord Chancellor to create categories based on things other than the financial value of the case, such as the complexity involved or the importance of any legal question likely to be raised. An exception to this rule is that the Lord Chancellor cannot ask the County Court to hear any case of judicial review.

The result of this section of the act is that any case worth less than £25,000 is dealt with in the County Court, any case worth between £25,000 and £50,000 is dealt with in either the County Court or the High Court depending on the complexity and any case worth more than £50,000 is dealt with in the High Court. Claims worth under £3,000 are automatically dealt with by the small claims track of the County Court. This has drastically speeded up proceedings in the High Court by making sure that only "important" and valuable cases are dealt with by them.

The County Courts Act 1984 permitted the High Court to transfer any part of a High Court case to a county court in one of three situations; firstly if the parties consent, secondly where the High Court believes the amount in dispute is below the maximum amount the County Court is allowed to deal with and thirdly where the High Court believes that the case is not likely to raise any important question of law. Before the passing of the Courts and Legal Services Act, around 13,000 cases were transferred to the county courts each year in this way. The act changed the system so that the High Court has a discretionary power to transfer any proceedings to the county courts.

Section 3 of the Courts and Legal Services Act amends the County Courts Act 1984 to allow the county courts to award any remedy used by the High Court. There were several exceptions because the status of the County Courts made it illogical to allow them to write orders of mandamus or certiorari. The new section also allows the Lord Chancellor to prohibit the county courts from making certain other types of order, with these types to be introduced by statutory instrument. Again, these are orders which it would be illogical to allow the county courts to write, such as Anton Piller orders or Mareva injunctions.

The act also removes certain absolute rights of appeal (allowing parties to appeal regardless of the opinion of the High Court judge) from the High Court to the Court of Appeal. This was hotly debated, but the Master of the Rolls pointed out in Parliament that there is a significantly higher success rate in cases where the parties require the judge's permission to appeal than cases where the parties have absolute rights of appeal, implying that the restriction of absolute rights of appeal should cut pointless cases out of the court system and speed up the process.

==== Evidence ====
The act also changed the court rules on the submission of evidence. The Civil Justice Review found that many cases which could easily have been settled before the hearings in court were not, primarily because there was no way of assessing the strength of the other side's arguments and their evidence. The Civil Justice Review suggested that forcing parties to provide evidence and witness statements to the other side before the case came to court would make this assessment easier, and would lead to the parties settling their case before it came to court if one side was at an obvious disadvantage. This suggestion was accepted, and included in the act, which says that each party must produce written statements of any oral evidence they intend to present in court, and that these statements should be given to the other party before the case comes to court. Any party who fails to comply with this may be refused leave to present this oral evidence in court. A similar system had been used in the Chancery Division, Admiralty Court and Commercial Court since 1986.

==== Representation ====
Prior to the passing of the Courts and Legal Services Act, only barristers, solicitors and the parties to a case had automatic rights of audience in the county courts (as established by the County Courts Act 1984). Other parties, if they were in "relevant legal employment", could also request rights of audience for a particular case. The Civil Justice Review found significant variations between courts as to who would be granted rights of audience, however, and Part I of the Courts and Legal Services Act attempted to address this. Section 11 allows the Lord Chancellor to make an order giving rights of audience to anyone in County Court cases of a certain type.

==== Costs ====
Section 4 of the act amended the Supreme Court Act 1981 to extend the rules on costs that govern the Supreme Court of England and Wales to the county courts as well. At the same time it introduced "wasted costs", which are costs to a party as a result of "an improper, unreasonable or negligent act or omission" from the other party. The act also applies special rules to High Court cases that the judge believes should have been brought in the County Court—the judge can reduce any costs by up to 25 percent to take into account the unneeded expense for both parties.

The act also introduces direct fines for parties that do not turn up to a hearing in a High Court or Crown Court case. If a party fails to attend an agreed meeting, with no warning beforehand, they can be summoned before the judge and asked to explain their behaviour. If the explanation is not satisfactory they can be fined up to £400. This section was not entirely popular with the Members of Parliament, with Lord Grantchester calling it "a sledgehammer to crack a nut".

=== Part II: Legal services ===
Part II of the act is considered the most important and sets out a new regulatory framework for the legal profession. This section is the subject of the "statutory objective", which reads "The general objective of this Part is the development of legal services in England and Wales (and in particular the development of advocacy, litigation, conveyancing and probate services) by making provision for new or better ways of providing such services and a wider choice of persons providing them, while maintaining the proper and efficient administration of justice." This "statutory objective" was a completely new way of introducing legislation, and is intended as an aid to those who have to apply it.

==== Rights of audience ====
The most important element of this Part was the extension of rights of audience in the higher courts to solicitors and other legal professionals. Sections 27 and 28 of Part II give an advocate rights of audience and the right to conduct litigation if the advocate is qualified to do so, is a member of a professional body recognised by the Lord Chancellor and that body considers him qualified to conduct litigation. A person also has rights of audience if they have been directly granted it, for example by the Lord Chancellor in County Court proceedings. The most immediate effect of this is that solicitors can now gain rights of audience in the Crown Court, High Court, Court of Appeal, Court of Session, Privy Council, and House of Lords if they qualify as Solicitor Advocates. Solicitor's clerks also have rights of audience in the chambers of judges in the Crown Court and High Court, assuming they are being instructed by a qualified solicitor.

A large amount of parliamentary time was spent debating the application of the cab-rank rule to new legal professionals granted rights of audience – the Bar argued that all people with rights of audience in the higher courts should be subject to the same rules as barristers, while the Law Society argued that solicitors were not at that time bound by the cab-rank rule in their dealings in the lower courts, and that there was no reason why this should not be extended to the higher courts.

Michael Zander argued that the demands for the extension of the cab rank rule to solicitors were overstated—before the passing of the act clients had always been able to find solicitors, and there was no reason why this should suddenly change when the act came into force. The Bar won this particular argument, however, and as a result anybody who can certificate advocates as qualified to hold rights of audience in the higher courts must have a code of conduct governing advocates who refuse cases.

==== Advisory committee ====
Section 19 of Part II established the Lord Chancellor's Advisory Committee on Legal Education and Conduct, which consists of a chairman (who must be a Lord of Appeal in Ordinary, Lord Justice of Appeal or a High Court judge) and sixteen other members, all appointed by the Lord Chancellor. The first chairman appointed was Lord Griffiths, a Lord of Appeal in Ordinary. The sixteen other members are divided so that:

- One is a Circuit Judge or former Circuit Judge
- Two are practising barristers
- Two are practising solicitors
- Two are law teachers or lecturers
- Nine are "lay members", which is defined as any person other than a judge, practising barrister, practising solicitor or law teacher.

This section of the act amended the House of Commons Disqualification Act 1975 to indicate that no Member of Parliament can be a member of the Advisory Committee. Committee members are to serve for five years, and provisions are made for them to be paid and for them to maintain a staff, all of which are to be paid from the Lord Chancellor's budget. The committee is required to produce an annual report, which the Lord Chancellor must present to both the House of Lords and the House of Commons.

The committee is tasked with maintaining and developing standards in "the education, training and conduct of those offering legal services", and with reviewing existing training schemes and any proposals for new training schemes.

==== Conveyancing ====
Section 36 removes limits on who can act as a conveyancer, and allows any individual, corporation or employee of a corporation to act as a conveyancer if they or the corporation is suitably qualified. Qualified people are defined as solicitors, barristers, licensed conveyancers and notaries, as well as any companies and incorporated bodies found in Section 9 of the Administration of Justice Act 1985. These people can apply to become authorised conveyancers by applying to the Authorised Conveyancing Practitioners Board, the regulatory body for conveyancing. Section 36 also repeals the section of the Building Societies Act 1986 that covered banks acting as conveyancers, since they are covered as "companies and incorporated bodies".

==== Authorised Conveyancing Practitioners Board ====
Section 34 establishes the Authorised Conveyancing Practitioners Board as a statutory corporation. The practitioners board is tasked with developing competition in conveyancing services to avoid monopolies, supervising the actions of licensed conveyancers and developing a way of monitoring said conveyancers. The practitioners board has the powers to both grant and refuse authorisation to conveyancing practitioners, establish a conveyancing ombudsman and a compensation scheme for parties that suffer as a result of a conveyancer's actions appoint investigators to look into the behaviour of an authorised conveyancer. There are therefore three regulatory bodies under this section—the practitioners board, the Law Society for regulating solicitors engaged in conveyancing work and the Council for Licensed Conveyancers charged with regulating licensed conveyancers.

The practitioners board is the body which authorises a person or body as fit to undertake conveyancing work. The practitioners board assumes that banks, insurance companies and building societies are by definition fit to undertake such work, while other individuals and bodies undergo a more detailed vetting process.

The practitioners board consists of a chairman and between four and eight other members appointed by the Lord Chancellor, who has to take into account "[the need] to provide a proper balance between the interests of authorised practitioners and those who make use of their services" when appointing members. As with the Lord Chancellor's Advisory Committee on Legal Education and Conduct, no Member of Parliament may be a member of the board. Members hold their position for three years, and as with the Advisory Committee they are provided with money for a staff and running costs. They are expected to submit a report once a year to the Lord Chancellor.

Sections 41 and 42 establish Conveyancing Appeals Tribunals which hear complaints against decisions made by the Authorised Conveyancing Practitioners Board. Decisions of the board which are appealed do not take effect until the appeal process is complete. The tribunals are made up of three members—two lay persons (classified as people who are not practising legal professionals) and one legal professional. Any appeals to tribunal decisions go to the High Court.

==== Functions of the Director General of Fair Trading ====
The act also modifies the functions of the Director General of Fair Trading by requiring any applications from a body to be allowed to certify advocates and any rules and regulations proposed by the Lord Chancellor in relation to conveyancing to be submitted to the director, who then advises the Lord Chancellor as to the viability of the documents. The Director General can order organisations and individuals to produce any documents relating to these applications or proposed rules, and applies section 85 of the Fair Trading Act 1973 to his duties. This act makes "wilfully altering, suppressing or destroying any document which you are required to produce" a criminal offence.

==== Probate services ====
Another aim of the act was to widen the pool of people qualified to carry out probate work. Two options were given in the Green Paper The Work and Organisation of the Legal Profession—firstly to allow more legal professionals to engage in probate work, such as licensed conveyancers, authorised conveyancers and chartered accountants. The second suggestion was to completely deregulate probate work, which would have allowed anyone to engage in probate work. This was problematic because of the possibility of fraud and error, but the general conclusion of the report was that there was some deregulation needed, along with a single code of conduct governing all probate work.

Section 54 of the act amends the Solicitors Act 1974 and allows the Official Solicitor, the public trustee, banks, building societies and insurance companies to prepare probate documents, as well as barristers, solicitors and notaries who were previously allowed to engage in probate work (although by convention, barristers did not). Banks, insurance companies and building societies are only allowed to take part if they sign up to a scheme for handling complaints established by the Lord Chancellor.

Section 55 creates "authorised probate practitioners", which allows professional bodies recognised by the Lord Chancellor to authorise people as capable of drawing up probate documents. The Lord Chancellor is required to refer applications by professional bodies to the Lord Chancellor's Advisory Committee on Legal Education and Conduct (ACLEC), which will then advise the Lord Chancellor on the validity of the application. The Lord Chancellor may refuse any application with a written reason, and the professional body applying may issue a reply within 28 days which the Lord Chancellor is required to consider. If the professional body is recognised, it may grant "authorised probate practitioner" status to any person who:

1. Is a member of the professional body
2. Is suitably trained
3. Is the "fit and proper" person to be running such a business
4. Has a professional indemnity scheme
5. Has made preparations to protect his clients in the event in which the practitioner stops practising
6. Has an adequate complaints procedure.

The Lord Chancellor may revoke his authorisation of a professional body to certify "authorised probate practitioners". In this case, all individuals which this body has certified cease to be valid practitioners. ACLEC may also investigate professional bodies and then advise the Lord Chancellor that it would be best to revoke their authorisation. The Lord Chancellor, if he accepts the advice, then gives written notice to the professional body, which is given three months to reply.

Section 54 also creates a new criminal offence of "providing false or misleading information in connection with an application for probate". If a person applies to become an authorised probate practitioner and makes a statement he knows to be false, or supports a statement he knows to be false, he is committing an offence. A person can also be charged if they make such statements recklessly. The act amends the Solicitors Act 1974 to make it a criminal offence to impersonate a probate practitioner.

==== Legal Services Ombudsman ====
Section 21 of the act creates a Legal Services Ombudsman to replace the Lay Observer. The ombudsman is tasked with investigating any allegation made to him about the way a complaint to a professional body such as the Law Society about one of its members has been handled. This covers "any professional body" which relates to Licensed Conveyancers, barristers, solicitors, notaries or any other body specified by the Lord Chancellor. The ombudsman may investigate the subject of the complaint itself, but cannot investigate any matter already settled by a court, the Solicitors Disciplinary Tribunal or a Bar Disciplinary Tribunal. The ombudsman also cannot investigate a complaint when the complaint is being investigated by the professional body, while the decision made by the professional body is being appealed or while the time limit for appeals has not yet expired. An exception to this is if the ombudsman feels that the professional body has not completed the investigation in a reasonable amount of time, or if they have mishandled the investigation.

The ombudsman holds his office for three years, and is appointed directly by the Lord Chancellor. The ombudsman may not be a Member of Parliament or a "person authorised to deliver legal services" such as a barrister, solicitor or notary. The ombudsman has both wages and a paid staff using money drawn from the Lord Chancellor's budget. The first Ombudsman was Michael Barnes, who took office on 2 January 1991 and served for two terms.

=== Part III: Judicial and other offices and judicial pensions ===
==== Judicial appointments ====
The Courts and Legal Services Act 1990 significantly modified the way judges are appointed. Before the passing of the act the highest judicial office that could be applied for was that of a circuit judge; anything higher was by invitation only. Section 71 of the act creates a new system of qualification for judicial offices. Among other things this opens up judicial offices in the Supreme Court of England and Wales to solicitors rather than just barristers. Judges of the High Court and above were still appointed by invitation only, however, although this changed with the Constitutional Reform Act 2005.

Section 75 of the act prevents a person holding a full-time judicial office from working as a barrister, solicitor, licensed conveyancer, public notary or from working with those who are.

==== Presiding judges and the Master of the Rolls ====
Section 72 creates Presiding Judges for each circuit to handle the administration of circuit courts. The act provides for one Senior Presiding Judge, who must be a Lord Justice of Appeal, and at least two Presiding Judges for each circuit, who must be judges of the High Court. This was simply the codification of existing practices, however, since judges already existed who would deal with the administrative work of circuit courts.

Section 73 allows the Master of the Rolls to delegate certain functions, particularly those related to public records, manorial documents, functions relating to solicitors under the Solicitors Act 1974 and functions relating to incorporated practices under the Administration of Justice Act 1985.

==== District judges and magistrates ====
Since the County Courts Act 1974 there had been a shift in the functions of county court registrars from an administrative to a judicial role. Section 74 of the act makes county court registrars district judges, recognising them as a formal part of the judiciary. They have the same powers as any other judge in relations to charging individuals for assault on an officer of the court and for refusing to give evidence.

Sections 108 and 109 of the act allow magistrates to enjoy immunity from civil suits in the same way that members of the judiciary do.

==== Retirement ages and judicial pensions ====
Section 77 of the act amends the Supreme Court Act 1981 to make the retirement age of the Official Solicitor, the Registrar of Criminal Appeals and the Permanent Secretary to the Lord Chancellor's Department 62, although this can be extended by the Lord Chancellor to 65. Previously the retirement age was 72.

Section 79 also introduces several technical rules relating to judicial pensions, with the aim being to bring the pension provisions in line with the Social Security Act 1985 and Social Security Act 1976. Firstly it provides for equality between male and female judges by allowing widowers to benefit from the scheme. It also inserts a new clause into the Judicial Pensions Act 1981 to allow HM Treasury to cut off pension payments for widows or widowers who remarry. Section 82 of the act allows judges to increase their pension pot by making voluntary contributions, and Section 83 allows a judge who has served for two years and is forced to retire due to ill-health access to a pension (previously a judge had to serve for at least five years).

=== Part IV: solicitors ===
Many sections of the act amend the law relating to solicitors already set out in other statutes, such as the Administration of Justice Act 1985.

==== Law Society of England and Wales ====
A significant amount of the act's coverage of solicitors relates to the Law Society of England and Wales and its various forms. Part IV of the act amends the Solicitors Act 1974 to enable the Council of the Law Society to delegate certain functions to committees and individuals, who do not necessarily need to be part of the Law Society. Some functions may not be delegated, such as setting rules and regulations related to the professional code of conduct, incorporated practices, the compensation fund and the indemnity requirements for practising solicitors.

The act also amends the Solicitors Act in relation to paying Law Society membership fees. Under the Solicitors Act, an employed solicitor working for a large practice in the City of London would not have to pay for new practice certificates (which help fund the Law Society) if his work was not work that only a solicitor could do. This meant that the Law Society was only being funded by some solicitors, who were being treated unfairly compared to their directly employed fellows. The act inserts a new clause into the Solicitors Act 1974 which expands the definition of what a solicitor requiring a practising certificate is to include any solicitor who works for a firm in a way related to legal services and is employed by:

- A solicitor, or;
- Any partnership containing a solicitor, or;
- An incorporated practice.

The act also amends the Solicitors Act to allow the Law Society to restrict practising certificates for solicitors charged with or convicted of conduct involving dishonesty or deception, as well as any crime defined as a "serious arrestable offence" by the Police and Criminal Evidence Act 1984. In addition it allows the Law Society to suspend any solicitor convicted of fraud or serious crime (if the Law Society has informed the Solicitors Disciplinary Tribunal) for six months, with a possible extension to twelve months. Since a practice certificate only lasts for twelve months, this effectively stops the solicitor from practising.

==== Multinational partnerships ====
Sections 89 and 14 of the act allow multinational partnerships between foreign lawyers and lawyers qualified in England and Wales. Foreign lawyers are defined as lawyers recognised by a professional body outside England and Wales, and are allowed to enter into partnerships with solicitors if they register with the Law Society of England and Wales. Section 89 of this act allows the Law Society to make rules governing the practice of law by foreign lawyers in England and Wales, and also to make additional rules for solicitors engaged in multinational partnerships.

==== Solicitors Disciplinary Tribunal ====
Section 94 of the act modifies the Solicitors Act 1974 to allow Solicitors Disciplinary Tribunals to strike solicitors from the roll, require a solicitor or former solicitor to answer allegations, terminate a suspension from practice authorised by a Tribunal and restore the name of a struck off solicitor to the roll. The power to force a former solicitor to answer to allegations is considered the most important one, because it prevents solicitors escaping punishment by ceasing to act as a solicitor. Section 95 of the act allows for appeals to the Law Society's refusal to put a solicitor who was previously struck off back on the roll, with this appeal going to the Master of the Rolls.

==== Barristers ====
Despite its name, section IV also contains provisions referring to barristers. Before the passing of the act there was no contractual relationship between a barrister and the instructing solicitor, or between a barrister and his client. This made it very difficult to obtain damages or recover money if there was a problem. A barrister was paid only as a matter of honour—there was no contract requiring that he be paid for his services, and no way of gaining his fee if he was not. The way that the legal profession got around this was by making it an act of professional misconduct for a solicitor not to pay the fees of a barrister in a case.

Section 61 of the act allows barristers to enter into contracts relating to their legal services, although it does not prevent the Bar Council from making rules restricting who a barrister can deal with.

Section 64 amends the Sex Discrimination Act 1975 and the Race Relations Act 1976 to make it unlawful for a barrister or barrister's clerk to discriminate against women or against people "on racial grounds" when offering pupillages or tenancies. This can be in relation to on what terms the pupillage/tenancy is offered, the arrangements made for who should be offered the pupillage/tenancy or the benefits, services and facilities which are "afforded or denied". It also makes discriminating when "giving, withholding or accepting" unlawful.

==== Notaries ====
Part IV also contains provisions relating to notaries. The office of notary is an extremely old one, having existed since a statute in 1533, and the act attempted to modernise the office. Previously many notaries were only allowed to act in a certain area, and Section 57 of the act removes this geographical restriction. The act also gives the Master of the Faculties, in Section 57, the power to "make provision concerning the education, training, practice, conduct and discipline of notaries", along with the way they keep records and accounts, their professional indemnity arrangements and a compensation scheme for people who lose money as a result of the dishonesty of a notary.

=== Part V: Arbitration ===
Part V of the act concerns arbitration, a method of Alternative Dispute Resolution (ADR). Among other things it gives new powers to the High Court to exercise powers conferred by the arbitrator, and gives the arbitrators more powers to dismiss claims or counter-claims.

==== Vacancies ====
Section 101 of the act amends the Arbitration Act 1950 to allow the High Court to appoint arbitrators to panels of 3 arbitrators where one has not been selected within a reasonable time. Previously the Arbitration Act only covers the appointment of individual arbitrators.

==== Role of the referee ====
Section 11 of the Arbitration Act 1950 said that any reference to a dispute should be made to an official referee, and that the referee could not refuse this request. Section 99 of the Courts and Legal Services Act 1990 amends this and changes the language to be permissive rather than mandatory—a referee must consult the Lord Chief Justice before he is allowed to take part. This section of the act also allows the referee to claim fees, and the control over outside arbitrators previously held by the High Court is moved to the Court of Appeal.

=== Part VI: Miscellaneous and supplemental provisions ===
Part VI of the act is concerned with miscellaneous and supplementary sections, such as correcting omissions in previous pieces of legislation.

==== Family proceedings and the Children Act 1989 ====
Sections 9, 10 and 166 correct various errors and omissions found in the Children Act 1989. Section 9 allows the Lord Chancellor to transfer any family law case to any specific judge or type of judge. Section 10 makes provisions for the appointment of clerks to the Inner London Crown Court, and Section 166 extends certain elements of the Children Act to Northern Ireland.

Schedule 16 gives the Secretary of State the power to appoint guardians ad litem and also gives the guardian access to records on the child they are responsible for. Section 16 modifies the Children Act to take into account the decision in R. v Newham London Borough Council ex parte P by considering parents of a child in care "parents" only if the child stays with them for more than 24 hours—previously the Local Council would only have to provide accommodation for the child if the child was not with its parents, regardless of how long the child had been with the parents.

==== Representation under legal aid ====
The new changes to who can gain rights of audience necessitated changes to the way legal aid worked. Section 59 of the act allows the defendant in the Crown Court to decide what sort of "legal representative" (barrister or solicitor) they would like to represent them. This was put in after pressure from the Bar Council and the Law Society, both of which were worried that the other part of the legal profession would get the majority of the cases. There are exceptions, however—in a magistrates' court legal aid only provides for a solicitor, because the case is so simple that it would be a waste of money to employ a barrister.

==== Jurisdiction of the Parliamentary Commissioner for Administration ====
Section 110 extends the duties of the Parliamentary Commissioner for Administration to include investigating administrative functions and actions taken by court or tribunal staff appointed by the Lord Chancellor when those actions were not ordered by any person acting in a judicial authority. This makes the court and tribunal staff more accountable for their actions, and also provides a means of redressing problems faced by users of the courts or tribunals.

==== Costs against legal representatives ====
Section 111 modifies the Prosecution of Offences Act 1985 and allows a magistrates' court, the Crown Court or the Court of Appeal to order a legal representative in a criminal trial to pay for any "wasted costs" (costs to a party as a result of "an improper, unreasonable or negligent act or omission" from the other party). The legal representative may appeal this decision in a magistrates' court or the Crown Court, but not in the Court of Appeal.

The procedure is similar in a civil case, with the exception that the legal representative can try and prove that the costs were not "wasted", and that the order to pay wasted costs must be made within six months of the case.

==== Bail applications and rights of audience for Crown Prosecutors ====
Section 115 amends the Prosecution of Offences Act 1985 to allow designated staff of the Crown Prosecution Service who are not Crown Prosecutors to appear on behalf of the CPS at bail hearings in court. They are not as independent in such circumstances as a Crown Prosecutor would be, because they can only act in accordance with instructions given to them by a Crown Prosecutor. Schedule 18 modifies the Prosecution of Offences Act 1985 to allow the Lord Chancellor to modify the rights of audience of Crown Prosecutors.

== Scope and implementation of the act ==
While most of the act covers England and Wales only, some sections extend to Scotland and Northern Ireland. Particular examples of this are the amendments to the Children Act 1989 and the rules on judicial pensions and appointments.

The act was implemented at different times—some sections came into force on 1 November 1990, such as the allocation of business between the High Court and county courts, Some came into force on 1 January 1991 such as the new discrimination laws in relation to barristers and barrister's clerks and some came into force at later dates determined by the Lord Chancellor.

The clause on judicial pensions came into force on 1 January 1992. On 1 October 1991, the clauses on multinational partnerships and the modifications to the Children Act came into force.

The clause dealing with elimination of certain absolute rights of appeal, as well as the clause on recovery of costs in civil cases, came into force on 1 June 1992.

== Bibliography ==
Primary sources

- Lord Chancellor's Dept. The Work and organisation of the legal profession. Cm—570. ISBN 0-10-105702-4.
- "Courts and Legal Services Bill [H.L.]". Parliamentary Debates (Hansard). House of Lords. 23 January 1990. col. 1008–47.
- "Sitting of (Hansard)". Parliamentary Debates (Hansard). House of Lords. 25 January 1990. col. 1165–1219, 1230–97.
- Courts and Legal Services Act 1990. The Stationery Office Limited. 16 November 1990. ISBN 0-10-544190-2.

Secondary sources

- Abel, Richard (1998). The Making of the English Legal Profession. Beard Books. ISBN 1-58798-250-1.
- Elliott, Catherine; Frances Quinn (2008). English Legal System (9th ed.). Edinburgh: Pearson Education Limited. ISBN 978-1-4058-5941-7.
- Jackson, Richard Meredith; J. R. Spencer (1989). Jackson's Machinery of Justice (8th ed.). Cambridge University Press. ISBN 0-521-31767-3.
- Merricks, Walter; Russell Wallman (1990). The Courts and Legal Services Act—A Solicitor's Guide. London: The Law Society. ISBN 1-85328-053-4.
- Merricks, Waltert (1991). "COURTS & LEGAL SERVICES ACT—What the Act means to us". Law Society Gazette. 87 (16). ISSN 0262-1495.
- Mothersole, Brenda; Ann Ridley (1999). A-level law in action (2nd ed.). Cengage Learning EMEA. ISBN 0-333-72780-0.
- Slapper, Gary; David Kelly (2001). The English legal system (5th ed.). Routledge. ISBN 1-85941-657-8.
- White, Robin (1991). A Guide to the Courts and Legal Services Act 1990. London: Fourmat Publishing. ISBN 1-85190-120-5.
- Zander, Michael (2007). Cases and Materials on the English Legal System (10th ed.). Cambridge University Press. ISBN 978-0-521-67540-6.
