= Benson Commission =

Royal Commission on legal services

The Royal Commission on Legal Services, commonly known as the Benson Commission (after its chairman Sir Henry Benson) was a Royal Commission set up by the Labour government of Harold Wilson to "examine the structure, organisation, training and regulation of the legal profession and to recommend those changes that would be desirable to the interests of justice". The commission and its report are seen as one of the elements that led to the passing of the Courts and Legal Services Act 1990.

== Background ==
During the 1960s the legal profession (barristers, solicitors, and certificated notaries) came under fire for what was perceived to be poor performance, the high cost of conveyancing, and its failure to deal with the needs of all levels of society. In response, the Labour government under Harold Wilson created a Royal Commission on Legal Services, known as the Benson Commission (after its chairman Sir Henry Benson), which was asked to "examine the structure, organisation, training and regulation of the legal profession and to recommend those changes that would be desirable to the interests of justice". The Commission frightened legal professionals, who believed that they were likely to face severe structural changes and lose their monopolies on probate and conveyancing work.

== Commission ==
The commission was led by Sir Henry Benson, and also had a sub-committee looking at legal education, which was led by R.G. Dahrendorf.

The commission's report was presented to Parliament in October 1979. It did not propose any radical changes, with one editorial describing it as "characterised by an over-anxiety not to offend the professional establishment". In particular it ruled out the possibility of partnerships between barristers. It also upheld the idea of a split profession (one with both solicitors and barristers, in contrast to a fused profession), saying that:

"with regard to the administration of justice, the weight of evidence is strongly to the effect that a two-branch profession is more likely than a fused one to ensure the high quality of advocacy that is indispensable, so long as our system remains in its present form, to secure the proper quality of justice"

The report also rejected the suggestion to allow solicitors rights of audience in the High Court The report concluded that the practice of law was a profession, and that a profession had to be independent of government, because without independence the interests of a client cannot be a primary consideration. It did not challenge the existing professional self-regulation through organisations such as the Law Society and Bar Council. The Commission did recommend an examination of the court and legal procedures to see if time and money could be saved for the parties involved.

The report also left the conveyancing monopoly of solicitors intact, although it did pave the way for the system of licensed conveyancers established by the Access to Justice Act 1975.

In other ways, however, the report was revolutionary – it recommended a Council of Legal Services to advise the Lord Chancellor (something eventually realised in the Lord Chancellor's Advisory Committee on Legal Education and Conduct), a movement of advice services such as the Citizens Advice Bureau into the legal fold, and a single unified body to regulate barristers, rather than a fragmentation between the Bar Council and Inns of Court.

The government response to the Benson Committee's report was published in 1983, and established a Civil Justice Review to examine court procedure. The report of the review board was put before the House of Commons on 7 June 1988.

== Impact ==
The report did not have the impact that Benson wanted - The government took four years to reply to the report, and did not institute many of the changes he recommended. By 1995 the citizen advice services were still not within the legal mainstream, and it took 12 years to implement other recommendations (such as that the Lord Chancellor should have a junior minister in the House of Commons). Despite this the commission and its report are seen as leading to the Courts and Legal Services Act 1990, even though the act disagreed with the report of the Commission in many ways.

== Bibliography ==
- Jackson, Richard Meredith; J. R. Spencer (1989). Jackson's Machinery of Justice (8th ed.). Cambridge University Press. ISBN 0-521-31767-3.
- Merricks, Walter; Russell Wallman (1990). The Courts and Legal Services Act - A Solicitor's Guide. London: The Law Society. ISBN 1-85328-053-4.
- Mothersole, Brenda; Ann Ridley (1999). A-level law in action (2nd ed.). Cengage Learning EMEA. ISBN 0-333-72780-0.
- White, Robin (1991). A Guide to the Courts and Legal Services Act 1990. London: Fourmat Publishing. ISBN 1-85190-120-5.
- Zander, Michael (2007). Cases and Materials on the English Legal System (10th ed.). Cambridge University Press. ISBN 978-0-521-67540-6.
