= Authorised Conveyancing Practitioners Board =

British professional association

The Authorised Conveyancing Practitioners Board is the regulatory organisation and professional association for authorised conveyancers in the United Kingdom. Created in 1990 by the Courts and Legal Services Act 1990, the Practitioners Board oversees authorised conveyancers in the United Kingdom, advising the Lord Chancellor on conveyancing matters, regulating authorised conveyancers and preventing the creation of conveyancing monopolies like those that existed before the 1990 act.

As part of its duties, the Practitioners Board maintains several other regulatory bodies, such as the conveyancing appeal tribunals and the Conveyancing Ombudsman.

== Creation ==
Before the passing of the Courts and Legal Services Act 1990, solicitors had a near-complete monopoly on conveyancing work. The introduction of licensed conveyancers with the passage of the Administration of Justice Act 1985 did little to change the situation, with no great switch in conveyancing work from solicitors to licensed conveyancers. In an attempt to disrupt this monopoly and act on the conclusions of the Civil Justice Review, the British Government passed the Courts and Legal Services Act 1990, one of the aims of which was to widen the field of who could become a conveyancer. As such, Section 34 of the Courts and Legal Services Act 1990 established the Authorised Conveyancing Practitioners Board as a statutory corporation.

== Remit ==
The Practitioners Board is tasked with developing competition in conveyancing services to avoid monopolies, supervising the actions of licensed conveyancers and developing a way of monitoring said conveyancers. The Practitioners Board has the powers to both grand and refuse authorisation to conveyancing practitioners, establish a conveyancing ombudsman and a compensation scheme for parties that suffer as a result of a conveyancer's actions appoint investigators to look into the behaviour of an authorised conveyancer.

In terms of who can become a conveyancer – Section 36 removes limits on who can act as a conveyancer, and allows any individual, corporation or employee of a corporation to act as a conveyancer if they or the corporation is suitably qualified. Qualified people are defined as solicitors, barristers, licensed conveyancers and notaries, as well as any companies and incorporated bodies found in Section 9 of the Administration of Justice Act 1985. These people can apply to become authorised conveyancers by applying to the Authorised Conveyancing Practitioners Board. To allow an applicant to act as an authorised conveyancer, the Practitioners Board must be convinced that the applicant is a "fit and proper person" to carry out this business, and that the applicant will follow the rules and regulations established by the Practitioners Board.

The board can refuse applications, although they must provide a reason, which the applicant is entitled to reply to in writing within 28 days of it being issued. The Practitioners Board can also suspend a conveyancer or revoke his authorisation to provide conveyancing circumstances, which can be for a fixed or indefinite period. The board also maintains a compensation scheme for compensating individuals who lose money as a result of dishonest behaviour by authorised practitioners or the employees of authorised practitioners, which is paid for out of the annual fees authorised conveyancers pay each year.

== Structure ==
The Practitioners Board consists of a chairman and between four and eight other members appointed by the Lord Chancellor, who has to take into account "[the need] to provide a proper balance between the interests of authorised practitioners and those who make use of their services" when appointing members. As with the Lord Chancellor's Advisory Committee on Legal Education and Conduct, no Member of Parliament may be a member of the Board. Members hold their position for three years, and as with the Advisory Committee they are provided with money for a staff and running costs. They are expected to submit a report once a year to the Lord Chancellor.

Sections 41 and 42 establish conveyancing appeals tribunals which hear complaints against decisions made by the Practitioners Board. Decisions of the Board which are appealed do not take effect until the appeal process is complete. The tribunals are made up of three members – two lay persons (classified as people who are not practising legal professionals) and one legal professional. Any appeals to tribunal decisions go to the High Court.

Section 43 of the Act establishes a Conveyancing Ombudsman who investigates complaints against authorised practitioners. This individual is paid for by the Practitioners Board, and presents an annual report to the Board detailing his activities.

== Bibliography ==
- Slapper, Gary; David Kelly (2001). The English legal system (5th ed.). Routledge. ISBN 1-85941-657-8.
- White, Robin (1991). A Guide to the Courts and Legal Services Act 1990. London: Fourmat Publishing. ISBN 1-85190-120-5.
