= Henry Benson, Baron Benson =

President of Institute of Chartered Accountants in England & Wales

The Right Honourable The Lord Benson
- Lord Benson in 1964

Personal details
- Born: Henry Alexander Benson; 2 August 1909 Johannesburg, Transvaal Colony
- Died: 5 March 1995 (aged 85) Chichester, Sussex, England
- Profession: Accountant

Henry Alexander Benson, Baron Benson GBE (2 August 1909 – 5 March 1995) was a British accountant best known as a partner of Coopers & Lybrand, an advisor to the Bank of England, his work organising the accountancy profession as president of Institute of Chartered Accountants in England & Wales and for the part he played in various Royal Commissions.

He was born in Johannesburg to Alexander Benson and his wife Florence Cooper, the daughter of Francis Cooper of Cooper Brothers & Co. Benson was educated initially in South Africa before moving to the United Kingdom in 1926, where he started training as an accountant with Cooper Brothers. After qualifying in 1932 he continued to work there, and became a salaried partner two years later at the age of 25. Following the outbreak of the Second World War Benson joined the Grenadier Guards as a second lieutenant, and was seconded to the Special Operations Executive in 1942 and then to the Ministry of Supply in 1944.

Benson helped build Coopers into an important international audit and accountancy firm as Coopers & Lybrand, and was the first living non-American elected to the Accounting Hall of Fame. He is known within the legal profession for his work on the Benson Commission, the report of which was one of the precursors of the Courts and Legal Services Act 1990.

== Early life ==
Benson was born on 2 August 1909 in Johannesburg to Alexander Benson, a solicitor, and his wife Florence Cooper, daughter of Francis Cooper, one of the founders of Coopers & Lybrand. He was educated at Parktown Boys' High School where he Matriculated in 1925. During a visit to London when he was 14, Benson and his mother had a meeting at Cooper Brothers, at which the partners made Benson an offer of employment as soon as he left school. He took up the offer in October 1926, and began as an articled clerk. Benson qualified as an Associate Chartered Accountant in 1932, coming eleventh in the intermediate examination and fourth in the final examination out of 1088 candidates.

== Coopers & Lybrand and war work ==
Benson started working for Cooper Brothers & Co as soon as he qualified, and became a partner in the firm in 1934 at the age of 25.

After the start of the Second World War in 1939 Benson became a second lieutenant in the Grenadier Guards thanks to the influence of his uncle D'Arcy Cooper and Viscount Trenchard. Benson spent a period guarding Windsor Castle, and while there wrote a report on improving the ways in which the soldiers communicated. In 1942 he was promoted to major and transferred to the Special Operations Executive, where he stayed for two years until he was promoted to colonel and transferred to the Ministry of Supply to help reorganise munitions factories. Benson became Director of Operations (accounts), putting him in charge of 100,000 people, and by the time he left the army in 1945 he was an acting brigadier. After leaving the army he was made a Commander of the Order of the British Empire in recognition of the work he had done.

After returning to Coopers after the end of the Second World War, Benson became enthusiastic about expanding the firm, something the firm's senior partner Stuart Cooper disagreed with. After several meetings in 1946 Cooper resigned, and Benson and his coworker Sydney John Pears took the reins of the company. They immediately overhauled the way the company was organised, and Benson published an internal manual governing how audits were to be conducted, which later became Cooper's Manual of Auditing. Although this was described in an earlier version of this entry as the standard textbook for accountancy students in the United Kingdom, this is not in fact the case. The manual was merely an internal document for use within Cooper Bros, and like a great deal of Benson's work, it was not held in high regard in the accountancy profession as a whole

In 1956 the American accounting firm Lybrand, Ross Brothers and Montgomery contacted Coopers and offered to sell them their London and Paris branches, an offer Benson accepted. This was seen as an opportunity to expand overseas, and from 1 January 1957 the company began working internationally and became known as Coopers & Lybrand. By the time Benson retired from Coopers in 1975 the company had 2,207 employees in the United Kingdom and 16,179 overseas, and Coopers & Lybrand was a leading audit and accountancy firm.

== Other work ==
In 1956 Benson became a member of the council of the Institute of Chartered Accountants in England & Wales, a position he held until 1975. He served as its vice-president from 1965 to 1966, when he became president. As president he saw the importance of international auditing standards, and was a founding member of the International Accounting Standards Committee. Benson became its first chairman in 1973, and was initially meant to retire after a year before he was persuaded to stay on until 1976. After his retirement in 1975 his main focus was on his work as an advisor to the Bank of England, but he also took on various jobs for the British Government.

In 1962, on the recommendation of Dr Richard Beeching, the Government of Northern Ireland commissioned Benson to report on the future of the railways of the Ulster Transport Authority. In 1963 Benson submitted his report, which recommended closing all railways in Northern Ireland except the Belfast commuter lines to Bangor, County Down and Larne and the main line between Belfast and the Republic of Ireland, and the reduction of the main line between Portadown and the Republic to single track.

Later in the 1960s Benson chaired a Committee of Enquiry for The Jockey Club into the UK's horse-racing industry. Its report was published in June 1968.

In July 1967 Benson was appointed chairman of a committee to review the management and organisation of the National Trust. The Benson report, published eighteen months later, recommended devolving management to the regions, introducing stringent financial controls and improving public access.

In 1976 he became chairman of the Royal Commission on Legal Services, which became known as the Benson Commission due to his involvement. The Commission was asked to "examine the structure, organisation, training and regulation of the legal profession and to recommend those changes that would be desirable to the interests of justice", and after three years produced a report "meticulously researched and backed by statistics, of the services given by the legal profession; it swept aside all cobwebs and displayed a deep understanding of all aspects of the framework and practices of the law". The report did not go as far as some reformers desired; it ruled out the possibility of partnerships between barristers, upheld the idea that a split profession (one with both solicitors and barristers, in contrast to a fused profession) and also rejected the suggestion to allow solicitors rights of audience in the High Court.

Despite this it contained several organisational suggestions for a profession with little in the way of straightforward organisation, such as a Council of Legal Services to advise the Lord Chancellor and a single unified body for barristers, rather than having both the Inns of Court and the Bar. Little of the report was acted on

== Family life ==
Benson married Anne Virginia "Ginny" Macleod on 2 September 1939. They had three children – Peter Benson in 1940, who later became a partner in Coopers & Lybrand and twins Michael and Phyllida Benson in 1943. Both his wife and children survived Benson, who died on 5 March 1995 in Chichester, Sussex.

== Awards and recognition ==
Benson received many awards for his work, both official and industrial. He was made a Commander of the Order of the British Empire (CBE) in the 1946 Birthday Honours and was promoted to a Knight Grand Cross (GBE) in the 1971 New Year Honours. He had also received a knighthood in the 1964 New Year Honours, the honour being conferred by the Duke of Edinburgh on 13 March 1964.

On 2 February 1981 he was created a life peer as Baron Benson, of Drovers in the County of West Sussex.

He became treasurer of the Open University in 1975 and a trustee of the Times Trust in 1967. In 1983 he became an Honorary Bencher of the Inner Temple, and in 1984 he became the first living non-American to be inducted into the Accounting Hall of Fame. In 1995 PricewaterhouseCoopers established a bursary in his name for students studying at the London School of Economics.

== Arms ==
Coat of arms of Henry Benson, Baron Benson

Coronet
A Coronet of a Baron
Crest
[On a Wreath Argent and Vert] a Demi-Lion guardant Argent murally crowned Or supporting with the paws a Hoop proper
Escutcheon
Checky Vert and Argent on a Fess Gules between in chief two Garbs and on base a Trefoil slipped an Abacus Or
Supporters
Dexter: a Pheasant; Sinister: a Halcyon, both proper

== Bibliography ==
- Camfferman, Kees; Stephen A. Zeff (2007). Financial reporting and global capital markets: a history of the International Accounting Standards Committee, 1973–2000. Oxford University Press. ISBN 978-0-19-929629-3.
- Jackson, Richard Meredith; J. R. Spencer (1989). Jackson's Machinery of Justice (8th ed.). Cambridge University Press. ISBN 0-521-31767-3.
- Mothersole, Brenda; Ann Ridley (1999). A-level law in action (2nd ed.). Cengage Learning EMEA. ISBN 0-333-72780-0.
- White, Robin (1991). A Guide to the Courts and Legal Services Act 1990. London: Fourmat Publishing. ISBN 1-85190-120-5.
- Zander, Michael (2007). Cases and Materials on the English Legal System (10th ed.). Cambridge University Press. ISBN 978-0-521-67540-6.
