= Barristers (Qualification for Office) Act 1961 =

Act of the Parliament of the United Kingdom

Barristers (Qualification for Office) Act 1961 (Note: Section 2.)
- Act of Parliament
- Parliament of the United Kingdom
- Long title: An Act to make provision with respect to the qualification for office of barristers who have been solicitors, and for purposes connected therewith.
- Citation: 9 & 10 Eliz. 2. c. 44
- Territorial extent: United Kingdom

Dates
- Royal assent: 19 July 1961
- Commencement: 19 July 1961 (Note: The Acts of Parliament (Commencement) Act 1793.)
- Repealed: 1 January 1991 (Note: The Courts and Legal Services Act 1990 (Commencement No. 2) Order 1990 (SI 1990/2484).)
Other legislation
Repealed by	Courts and Legal Services Act 1990

Status: Repealed

Text of statute as originally enacted

The Barristers (Qualification for Office) Act 1961 (9 & 10 Eliz. 2. c. 44) was an act of the Parliament of the United Kingdom that modified the requirements for a barristers call to the Bar. It consisted of only two sections, one of which was the act's short title. The act allowed time spent as a solicitor to be taken into account when calculating any required period of service for promotion to a role in, for example, the judiciary. The act was moved as a private members bill and given its second reading by Lord Mancroft, who personally felt that it would have little effect. It was, however, seen as a sign that the two branches of the English legal profession were moving closer to fusion, and allowed solicitors to take up judicial offices previously closed to them.

== Subsequent developments ==
The whole act was repealed by section 125(7) of, and schedule 20 to, the Courts and Legal Services Act 1990, which came into force on 1 January 1991.

== Bibliography ==
- C (1962). "Barristers (Qualification for Office) Act, 1961". The Modern Law Review. 25 (1). Blackwell. ISSN 0026-7961.
