= Glanville =

Glanville or Glanvill may refer to:

== People ==
=== Given name ===
- Glanville Downey (1908—1991), American historian
- Glanville Williams (1911–1997), Welsh legal scholar

=== Surname ===
- Ann Glanville (1796–1880), Cornish rower
- Brandi Glanville (born 1972), American television personality and former fashion model
- Brian Glanville (1931–2025), English football writer and novelist
- Christine Glanville (1924–1999), English puppeteer
- Doug Glanville (born 1970), American baseball player
- Eleanor Glanville (c. 1654–1709), English entomologist
- Ernest Glanville (1855–1925), South African author
- Francis Glanville (1827–1910), British Army general
- Harold Glanville (1854–1930), English businessman and politician
- Harold Glanville (junior) (1884–1966), English Liberal Party politician.
- Jacob Glanville, co-founder of Distributed Bio
- James Glanville (1891–1958), British politician
- Jason Glanville, leader in Australian Indigenous community
- Jerry Glanville (born 1941), American football coach
- Sir John Glanville (judge) (1542–1600), English Member of Parliament and judge
- Sir John Glanville (1586–1661), English politician
- Joseph Glanvill (1636–1680), English writer
- Lucy Glanville (born 1994), Australian biathlete
- Marc Glanville (born 1966), Australian rugby league footballer
- Mark Glanville, English classical singer and writer
- Peggy Glanville-Hicks (1912–1990), Australian composer
- Phil de Glanville (born 1968), English rugby union player
- Ranulf de Glanvill (died 1190), English justiciar
- Ranulph Glanville (1946–2014), English researcher
- Stephen Glanville (1900–1956), English Egyptologist
- Sir William Glanville (1900–1976), British civil engineer

== Places ==
- Glanville, Calvados, commune in département Calvados, Normandy, France
- Glanville, South Australia, suburb of Adelaide, Australia
  - Glanville railway station

== Other uses ==
- Tractatus de legibus et consuetudinibus regni Anglie, the earliest English law treatise (1187–9), commonly called Glanvill after its attribution to Ranulf de Glanvill
- Glanville fritillary, butterfly
- Glanville Davies affair

== See also ==
- Glanvilles, a village in Antigua and Barbuda
- Glanvilles Wootton, also known as Wootton Glanville, a place in Dorset, England
