= Police Pensions Act 1961 =

Act of the Parliament of the United Kingdom

Police Pensions Act 1961 (Note: Section 2(1).)
- Act of Parliament
- Parliament of the United Kingdom
- Long title: An Act to provide for the consolidation, with or without changes authorised by the Police Pensions Act, 1948, of regulations under section one of that Act; and to make further provision for the application of the regulations in relation to special constables.
- Citation: 9 & 10 Eliz. 2. c. 35
- Territorial extent: England and Wales; Scotland; (Note: Section 2(2).)

Dates
- Royal assent: 22 June 1961
- Commencement: 22 June 1961 (Note: The Acts of Parliament (Commencement) Act 1793.)

Other legislation
- Amends: Police Pensions Act 1948
- Amended by: Police Pensions Act 1976
- Relates to: Special Constables Act 1914; Police (Scotland) Act 1956

Status: Amended

Text of statute as originally enacted

Revised text of statute as amended

Text of the Police Pensions Act 1961 as in force today (including any amendments) within the United Kingdom, from legislation.gov.uk.

The Police Pensions Act 1961 (9 & 10 Eliz. 2. c. 35) is an act of the Parliament of the United Kingdom that provided for the consolidation of regulations under section one of the Police Pensions Act 1948 (4 & 5 Eliz. 2. c. 26) and made further provision for the application of those regulations in relation to special constables in Great Britain.

== Provisions ==
Section 1 of the act confirmed that the power to make regulations under section 1 of the Police Pensions Act 1948 (11 & 12 Geo. 6. c. 24) included, and was deemed always to have included, the power to revoke regulations previously made under that section. However, regulations revoking previous regulations were required to contain provisions having the same effect as those revoked, except for any changes permitted under the 1948 act. The section also provided that any instrument under the Special Constables Act 1914 (4 & 5 Geo. 5. c. 61) or section 11 of the Police (Scotland) Act 1956 (4 & 5 Eliz. 2. c. 26) that revoked or changed regulations so as to affect existing benefits of special constables or their dependants was required to apply provisions of regulations under the 1948 act so as to secure benefits not less advantageous than those previously held.
