= List of acts of the 2nd session of the 42nd Parliament of the United Kingdom =

This is a list of acts of the 2nd session of the 42nd Parliament of the United Kingdom, which ran from 1 November 1960 until 24 October 1961.

Acts passed before 1963 are cited by the regnal year(s) in which the relevant parliamentary session was held, as opposed to the convention used for later acts of citing the calendar year. Each act passed in a respective session is given a chapter number (abbreviated "c."), denoted by Arabic numerals in the case of public general acts, lowercase Roman numerals in the case of local acts, or italicised Arabic numerals in the case of personal acts. These run as separate series.

112 acts of Parliament were passed by the 42nd Parliament in its 2nd session: 65 public general acts and 47 local acts.

indicates that an act has been transcribed on Wikisource, indicates that an act is available to view at legislation.gov.uk, and indicates the location of the original act in the Parliamentary Archives.

== Public general acts ==
Short title	Citation	Royal assent
Long title
Indus Basin Development Fund Act 1960 (repealed)	9 & 10 Eliz. 2. c. 1	20 December 1960
An Act to provide for United Kingdom contributions towards the cost of certain works for the Indus river basin. (Repealed by Statute Law (Repeals) Act 1977 (c. 18))
British North America Act 1960	9 & 10 Eliz. 2. c. 2	20 December 1960
An Act to amend the British North America Act, 1867.
Administration of Justice (Judges and Pensions) Act 1960 (repealed)	9 & 10 Eliz. 2. c. 3	20 December 1960
An Act to provide for the appointment of additional judges of the High Court and Court of Appeal; and to make further provision with respect to the pensions of certain judicial officers. (Repealed by Senior Courts Act 1981 (c. 54))
Expiring Laws Continuance Act 1960	9 & 10 Eliz. 2. c. 4	20 December 1960
An Act to continue certain expiring laws.
National Insurance Act 1960 (repealed)	9 & 10 Eliz. 2. c. 5	20 December 1960
An Act to amend the rates or amounts of contributions and benefits under the National Insurance (Industrial Injuries) Acts, 1946 to 1959, and the National Insurance Acts, 1946 to 1959, not being graduated contributions or graduated retirement benefit; to modify the provisions of the National Insurance Act, 1946, under which persons are treated as having retired; and for purposes connected with the matters aforesaid. (Repealed by Statute Law Revision (Consequential Repeals) Act 1965 (c. 55))
Ministers of the Crown (Parliamentary Secretaries) Act 1960	9 & 10 Eliz. 2. c. 6	20 December 1960
An Act to replace the existing limits on the numbers of Parliamentary Secretaries in individual departments by a single aggregate limit; to authorise the payment of a salary to a Parliamentary Secretary to the Minister for Science; and to increase the salary of the Captain of the Gentlemen-at-Arms.
Consolidated Fund Act 1961	9 & 10 Eliz. 2. c. 7	2 March 1961
An Act to apply a sum out of the Consolidated Fund to the service of the year ending on the thirty-first day of March, one thousand nine hundred and sixty-one.
Electricity (Amendment) Act 1961	9 & 10 Eliz. 2. c. 8	2 March 1961
An Act to empower the Central Electricity Generating Board to produce radioactive material in a nuclear reactor at any of the Board's generating stations for sale or supply to other persons, and to sell or supply radioactive material produced in any such reactor; and for purposes connected therewith.
Agricultural Research etc. (Pensions) Act 1961	9 & 10 Eliz. 2. c. 9	2 March 1961
An Act to provide for contributory pension schemes in respect of persons employed at certain agricultural institutions and colleges financed wholly or partly out of public funds.
Overseas Service Act 1961	9 & 10 Eliz. 2. c. 10	2 March 1961
An Act to authorise the Secretary of State to contribute to the expenses incurred in connection with the employment of persons in the public services of overseas territories or in respect of compensation paid to persons who are or have been employed in those services.
Diplomatic Immunities (Conferences with Commonwealth Countries and Republic of Ireland) Act 1961	9 & 10 Eliz. 2. c. 11	2 March 1961
An Act to provide for conferring certain immunities on representatives of Governments of Commonwealth countries and the Republic of Ireland attending conferences in the United Kingdom and on their staffs.
Consolidated Fund (No. 2) Act 1961	9 & 10 Eliz. 2. c. 12	28 March 1961
An Act to apply certain sums out of the Consolidated Fund to the service of the years ending on the thirty-first day of March, one thousand nine hundred and sixty, one thousand nine hundred and sixty-one and one thousand nine hundred and sixty-two.
National Health Service Contributions Act 1961	9 & 10 Eliz. 2. c. 13	28 March 1961
An Act to increase the rates of national health service contributions and to amend the National Health Service Contributions Act, 1957, and for purposes connected therewith.
Nurses (Amendment) Act 1961	9 & 10 Eliz. 2. c. 14	28 March 1961
An Act to amend the law relating to nurses for the sick.
Post Office Act 1961 (repealed)	9 & 10 Eliz. 2. c. 15	28 March 1961
An Act to reorganise the financial arrangements of the Post Office; to amend the Post Office Act, 1953, and the Stamp Duties Management Act, 1891; and for purposes connected with the matters aforesaid. (Repealed by British Telecommunications Act 1981 (c. 38))
Sierra Leone Independence Act 1961	9 & 10 Eliz. 2. c. 16	28 March 1961
An Act to make provision for, and in connection with, the attainment by Sierra Leone of fully responsible status within the Commonwealth.
Betting Levy Act 1961	9 & 10 Eliz. 2. c. 17	28 March 1961
An Act to provide for contributions for purposes connected with the advancement of horse racing from persons engaged by way of business in effecting betting transactions on horse races; and for connected purposes.
White Fish and Herring Industries Act 1961	9 & 10 Eliz. 2. c. 18	9 May 1961
An Act to make further provision for financial assistance for the white fish and herring industries (including advances to the White Fish Authority).
National Health Service Act 1961 (repealed)	9 & 10 Eliz. 2. c. 19	9 May 1961
An Act to make further provision with respect to charges for the provision of dental and optical appliances and dental services under the National Health Service. (Repealed for England and Wales by National Health Service Act 1977 (c. 49) and for Scotland by National Health Service (Scotland) Act 1978 (c. 29))
Home Safety Act 1961	9 & 10 Eliz. 2. c. 20	18 May 1961
An Act to enable certain local authorities in England and Wales to promote safety in the home and to make contributions to voluntary organisations whose activities consist of or include the promotion of safety in the home.
Oaths Act 1961	9 & 10 Eliz. 2. c. 21	18 May 1961
An Act to amend the law as to oaths.
Restriction of Offensive Weapons Act 1961	9 & 10 Eliz. 2. c. 22	18 May 1961
An Act to amend the law in relation to the exposure and possession for the purpose of sale or hire, and to the importation, of flick knives and other dangerous weapons.
Republic of South Africa (Temporary Provisions) Act 1961 (repealed)	9 & 10 Eliz. 2. c. 23	18 May 1961
An Act to make temporary provision as to the operation of the law upon the Union of South Africa becoming a Republic outside the Commonwealth. (Repealed by Statute Law (Repeals) Act 1973 (c. 39))
Private Street Works Act 1961 (repealed)	9 & 10 Eliz. 2. c. 24	18 May 1961
An Act to amend the law relating to private street works in England and Wales. (Repealed by Highways Act 1980 (c. 66))
Patents and Designs (Renewals, Extensions and Fees) Act 1961	9 & 10 Eliz. 2. c. 25	22 June 1961
An Act to extend to six months the period of grace for the payment of renewal fees for patents and the payment of fees for the extension of the period of copyright in registered designs, to provide a like period of grace for the making of applications for such extension, to validate certain extensions of the said period of copyright, and to provide for amending provisions of the Patents Act, 1949, relating to fees.
Hyde Park (Underground Parking) Act 1961	9 & 10 Eliz. 2. c. 26	22 June 1961
An Act to enable the Minister of Transport to secure the provision of parking facilities under Hyde Park; and for purposes connected therewith.
Carriage by Air Act 1961	9 & 10 Eliz. 2. c. 27	22 June 1961
An Act to give effect to the Convention concerning international carriage by air known as "the Warsaw Convention as amended at The Hague, 1955", to enable the rules contained in that Convention to be applied, with or without modification, in other cases and, in particular, to non-international carriage by air; and for connected purposes.
Industrial and Provident Societies Act 1961 (repealed)	9 & 10 Eliz. 2. c. 28	22 June 1961
An Act to raise the limit on the interest in the shares of a society registered under the Industrial and Provident Societies Act, 1893, which any one member may hold and to enable certain societies to make advances of money to members without security. (Repealed by Industrial and Provident Societies Act 1965 (c. 12))
Rural Water Supplies and Sewerage Act 1961	9 & 10 Eliz. 2. c. 29	22 June 1961
An Act to amend section two of the Rural Water Supplies and Sewerage Act, 1944.
Department of Technical Co-operation Act 1961	9 & 10 Eliz. 2. c. 30	22 June 1961
An Act to provide for the establishment of a Department of Technical Co-operation under the charge of a Minister of the Crown.
Printer's Imprint Act 1961	9 & 10 Eliz. 2. c. 31	22 June 1961
An Act to make provision for relaxing certain requirements of the Newspapers, Printers, and Reading Rooms Repeal Act, 1869.
Local Authorities (Expenditure on Special Purposes) (Scotland) Act 1961	9 & 10 Eliz. 2. c. 32	22 June 1961
An Act to amend section three hundred and thirty-nine of the Local Government (Scotland) Act, 1947, with respect to the purposes for which payments may be made thereunder.
Land Compensation Act 1961	9 & 10 Eliz. 2. c. 33	22 June 1961
An Act to consolidate the Acquisition of Land (Assessment of Compensation) Act, 1919, and certain other enactments relating to the assessment of compensation in respect of compulsory acquisitions of interests in land; to the withdrawal of notices to treat; and to the payment of additional compensation and of allowances in connection with such acquisitions or with certain sales by agreement of interests in land; with corrections and improvements made under the Consolidation of Enactments (Procedure) Act, 1949.
Factories Act 1961	9 & 10 Eliz. 2. c. 34	22 June 1961
An Act to consolidate the Factories Acts, 1937 to 1959, and certain other enactments relating to the safety, health and welfare of employed persons.
Police Pensions Act 1961	9 & 10 Eliz. 2. c. 35	22 June 1961
An Act to provide for the consolidation, with or without changes authorised by the Police Pensions Act, 1948, of regulations under section one of that Act; and to make further provision for the application of the regulations in relation to special constables.
Finance Act 1961	9 & 10 Eliz. 2. c. 36	19 July 1961
An Act to grant certain duties, to alter other duties, and to amend the law relating to the National Debt and the Public Revenue, and to make further provision in connection with Finance.
Small Estates (Representation) Act 1961	9 & 10 Eliz. 2. c. 37	19 July 1961
An Act to amend the law relating to applications for grants of representation in the case of small estates.
Court of Chancery of Lancaster (Amendment) Act 1961	9 & 10 Eliz. 2. c. 38	19 July 1961
An Act to amend the Court of Chancery of Lancaster Act, 1952.
Criminal Justice Act 1961	9 & 10 Eliz. 2. c. 39	19 July 1961
An Act to amend the law with respect to the powers of courts in respect of young offenders; to make further provision as to the treatment of prisoners and other persons committed to custody, including provision for their supervision after discharge, and the management of prisons, approved schools and other institutions; to re-enact with modifications and additions certain statutory provisions relating to the removal, return and supervision of prisoners within the British Islands; and for purposes connected with the matters aforesaid.
Consumer Protection Act 1961	9 & 10 Eliz. 2. c. 40	19 July 1961
An Act to make provision for the protection of consumers.
Flood Prevention (Scotland) Act 1961	9 & 10 Eliz. 2. c. 41	19 July 1961
An Act to enable the councils of counties and burghs in Scotland to take measures for the prevention or mitigation of flooding of non-agricultural land in their areas; and for purposes connected with the matter aforesaid.
Sheriffs' Pensions (Scotland) Act 1961	9 & 10 Eliz. 2. c. 42	19 July 1961
An Act to amend the law with respect to the pensions attributable to the office of sheriff and salaried sheriff-substitute, to regulate the age of retirement from such offices, and to regulate the time at which payment may be made of those pensions and of the salaries attaching to the said offices.
Public Authorities (Allowances) Act 1961 (repealed)	9 & 10 Eliz. 2. c. 43	19 July 1961
An Act to provide for the amendment of the conditions giving entitlement to payment of certain allowances to members of bodies to which Part VI of the Local Government Act, 1948, applies, and to members of certain bodies constituted under the National Health Service Act, 1946, and the National Health Service (Scotland) Act, 1947, and to payment of travelling allowances to justices of the peace and members of probation and other committees constituted under the Criminal Justice Act, 1948; and for matters connected therewith. (Repealed by Statute Law (Repeals) Act 1976 (c. 16))
Barristers (Qualification for Office) Act 1961	9 & 10 Eliz. 2. c. 44	19 July 1961
An Act to make provision with respect to the qualification for office of barristers who have been solicitors, and for purposes connected therewith.
Rating and Valuation Act 1961	9 & 10 Eliz. 2. c. 45	27 July 1961
An Act to amend the law with respect to the valuation of property for the purposes of rates and with respect to the making and collection of rates.
Companies (Floating Charges) (Scotland) Act 1961	9 & 10 Eliz. 2. c. 46	27 July 1961
An Act to amend the law of Scotland so as to empower companies to give security by way of floating charges; and for purposes connected therewith.
Mock Auctions Act 1961	9 & 10 Eliz. 2. c. 47	27 July 1961
An Act to prohibit certain practices in relation to sales purporting to be sales by auction.
Land Drainage Act 1961 (repealed)	9 & 10 Eliz. 2. c. 48	27 July 1961
An Act to enable river boards and catchment boards to raise drainage charges for the purpose of meeting part of their expenses; and to make further provision relating to the drainage of land and to drainage boards. (Repealed by Land Drainage Act 1976 (c. 70))
Covent Garden Market Act 1961	9 & 10 Eliz. 2. c. 49	27 July 1961
An Act to establish a Covent Garden Market Authority and vest in them lands in the parish of Saint Paul, Covent Garden, and chattels the property of Covent Garden Market Limited; to make provision for the conduct in, and adjacent to, Covent Garden, under the control of the Covent Garden Market Authority, of activities relating to the dealing in bulk in horticultural produce; and to make provision with respect to matters arising out of the matters aforesaid.
Rivers (Prevention of Pollution) Act 1961	9 & 10 Eliz. 2. c. 50	27 July 1961
An Act to make further provision for maintaining or restoring the wholesomeness of the rivers and other inland or coastal waters of England and Wales.
Police Federation Act 1961 (repealed)	9 & 10 Eliz. 2. c. 51	27 July 1961
An Act to amend the law relating to the Police Federation. (Repealed by Police Act 1964 (c. 48))
Army and Air Force Act 1961	9 & 10 Eliz. 2. c. 52	27 July 1961
An Act to continue, and amend, the Army Act, 1955, and the Air Force Act, 1955; to amend the Courts-Martial (Appeals) Act, 1951; to validate the employment of British protected persons in certain military and air forces; and for purposes connected with the matters aforesaid.
North Atlantic Shipping Act 1961 (repealed)	9 & 10 Eliz. 2. c. 53	27 July 1961
An Act to enable the Minister of Transport to make advances to Cunard White Star Limited in connection with the construction of a large vessel for the North Atlantic shipping trade, and to enter into agreements with them concerning insurance risks connected with such a vessel. (Repealed by National Loans Act 1968 (c. 13))
Human Tissue Act 1961	9 & 10 Eliz. 2. c. 54	27 July 1961
An Act to make provision with respect to the use of parts of bodies of deceased persons for therapeutic purposes and purposes of medical education and research and with respect to the circumstances in which post-mortem examinations may be carried out; and to permit the cremation of bodies removed for anatomical examination.
Crown Estate Act 1961	9 & 10 Eliz. 2. c. 55	27 July 1961
An Act to make new provision in place of the Crown Lands Acts, 1829 to 1936, as to the powers exercisable by the Crown Estate Commissioners for the management of the Crown Estate, to transfer to the management of the Minister of Works certain land of the Crown Estate in Regent's Park and extend or clarify the powers of that Minister in Regent's Park, to amend the Forestry (Transfer of Woods) Act, 1923, as it affects the Crown Estate, to amend the law as to escheated land, and for purposes connected therewith.
Credit-Sale Agreements (Scotland) Act 1961	9 & 10 Eliz. 2. c. 56	27 July 1961
An Act to extend to Scotland sections one and three of the Hire-Purchase Act, 1938.
Trusts (Scotland) Act 1961	9 & 10 Eliz. 2. c. 57	27 July 1961
An Act to amend the law of Scotland relating to trusts.
Crofters (Scotland) Act 1961 (repealed)	9 & 10 Eliz. 2. c. 58	27 July 1961
An Act to make fresh provision with respect to the reorganisation, development and regulation of crofting in the crofting counties of Scotland; to authorise the making of grants and loans for the development of agricultural production on crofts and on holdings comparable in value and extent to crofts; and for purposes connected with the matters aforesaid. (Repealed by Crofters (Scotland) Act 1993 (c. 44))
Appropriation Act 1961	9 & 10 Eliz. 2. c. 59	3 August 1961
An Act to apply a sum out of the Consolidated Fund to the service of the year ending on the thirty-first day of March, one thousand nine hundred and sixty-two, and to appropriate the supplies granted in this Session of Parliament.
Suicide Act 1961	9 & 10 Eliz. 2. c. 60	3 August 1961
An Act to amend the law of England and Wales relating to suicide, and for purposes connected therewith.
Licensing Act 1961	9 & 10 Eliz. 2. c. 61	3 August 1961
An Act to amend the Licensing Act, 1953, to make further provision about the sale and supply of intoxicating liquor and about licensed premises, and for purposes connected therewith.
Trustee Investments Act 1961	9 & 10 Eliz. 2. c. 62	3 August 1961
An Act to make fresh provision with respect to investment by trustees and persons having the investment powers of trustees, and by local authorities, and for purposes connected therewith.
Highways (Miscellaneous Provisions) Act 1961 (repealed)	9 & 10 Eliz. 2. c. 63	3 August 1961
An Act to make certain amendments to the law relating to highways, streets and bridges in England and Wales. (Repealed by Highways Act 1980 (c. 66))
Public Health Act 1961	9 & 10 Eliz. 2. c. 64	3 August 1961
An Act to amend the provisions of the Public Health Act, 1936, relating to building byelaws, to make such amendments of the law relating to public health and the functions of county councils and other local authorities as are commonly made in local Acts, to amend the law relating to trade effluents and to amend section two hundred and forty-nine of the said Act of 1936.
Housing Act 1961	9 & 10 Eliz. 2. c. 65	24 October 1961
An Act to make further arrangements for the giving of financial assistance for the provision of housing accommodation, to confer further powers on local authorities as regards houses let in lodgings or occupied by more than one family, and houses or other buildings affected by clearance orders and demolition orders, to amend section five of the Rent Act, 1957, by allowing a greater increase in the permitted rent for improvements, to alter the circumstances in which improvement grants and standard grants may be made under Part II of the Housing (Financial Provisions) Act, 1958, and the Housing and House Purchase Act, 1959, to amend the law with respect to repairing obligations in short tenancies of dwelling-houses, and to amend the Town Development Act, 1952, as regards development carried out wholly or partly in a county borough and as regards the assistance which may be given by a county council for town development; and for purposes connected with any of those matters.

== Local Acts ==
Short title	Citation	Royal assent
Long title
Aberdeen Harbour Order Confirmation Act 1960	9 & 10 Eliz. 2. c. i	20 December 1960
An Act to confirm a Provisional Order under the Private Legislation Procedure (Scotland) Act 1936 relating to Aberdeen Harbour.
	Aberdeen Harbour Order 1960 Provisional Order to incorporate the Aberdeen Harbour Board and to transfer to and vest therein the harbour undertaking of the Aberdeen Harbour Commissioners and to determine and regulate the administration of the port and harbour of Aberdeen and for the purposes connected therewith.	
Clyde Navigation Order Confirmation Act 1960	9 & 10 Eliz. 2. c. ii	20 December 1960
An Act to confirm a Provisional Order under the Private Legislation Procedure (Scotland) Act 1936 relating to Clyde Navigation.
	Clyde Navigation Order 1960 Provisional Order to amend the provisions of the Clyde Navigation Acts 1929 to 1959 relating to rates and for other purposes.	
Forth Road Bridge Order Confirmation Act 1960	9 & 10 Eliz. 2. c. iii	20 December 1960
An Act to confirm a Provisional Order under the Private Legislation Procedure (Scotland) Act 1936 relating to the Forth Road Bridge.
	Forth Road Bridge Order 1960 Provisional Order to confer further powers on the Forth Road Bridge Joint Board and to enact further provisions with respect to certain of the works authorised by the Forth Road Bridge Orders 1947 to 1958 to make provision as to the acquisition and utilisation of lands by the said Board and for other purposes.	
Zetland County Council (Symbister Harbour) Order Confirmation Act 1961	9 & 10 Eliz. 2. c. iv	2 March 1961
An Act to confirm a Provisional Order under the Private Legislation Procedure (Scotland) Act 1936 relating to Zetland County Council (Symbister Harbour).
	Zetland County Council (Symbister Harbour) Order 1961 Provisional Order to authorise the County Council of the county of Zetland to construct and maintain works and form a harbour at Symbister island of Whalsay in the parish of Nesting Lunnasting Whalsay and Skerries and county of Zetland and to acquire lands to define harbour limits to authorise the levying and collection of rates and charges to confer powers to borrow money and for other purposes.	
Cardiff Corporation Act 1961	9 & 10 Eliz. 2. c. v	2 March 1961
An Act to empower the lord mayor aldermen and citizens of the city of Cardiff to construct works for the reclamation of and to reclaim certain lands from the foreshore and bed of the sea and to acquire lands for those purposes to confer further powers on them and to make further provision with regard to lands streets and buildings and the health local government welfare improvement and finances of the city and for other purposes.
Esso Petroleum Company Act 1961	9 & 10 Eliz. 2. c. vi	2 March 1961
An Act to empower Esso Petroleum Company Limited to construct pipelines and other works and to acquire lands and for other purposes.
Mersey Tunnel Act 1961	9 & 10 Eliz. 2. c. vii	9 May 1961
An Act to amend certain financial provisions of the Mersey Tunnel Acts, 1925 to 1955; and for other purposes.
Allhallows Staining Churchyard Act 1961	9 & 10 Eliz. 2. c. viii	9 May 1961
An Act to authorise the sale of the churchyard of the former church of Allhallows Staining to the Master, Wardens and Commonalty of Freemen of the Art or Mystery of Clothworkers of the City of London; and for other purposes.
Rio Tinto Rhodesian Mining Limited Act 1961	9 & 10 Eliz. 2. c. ix	9 May 1961
An Act to provide for the transfer to Southern Rhodesia of the registration of Rio Tinto Rhodesian Mining Limited, to apply to the Company the provisions of the Companies Act, 1951, of the said territory in place of certain provisions of the Companies Act, 1948; and for other purposes.
Shell Brazil Act 1961	9 & 10 Eliz. 2. c. x	9 May 1961
An Act to make provision for the transfer to the United States of Brazil of the registered office of Shell Brazil Limited for the purpose of enabling that company to assume Brazilian nationality, for the cesser of application to that company of provisions of the Companies Act, 1948, consequent upon such assumption; and for other purposes incidental thereto.
Winchester Cathedral Close Act 1961	9 & 10 Eliz. 2. c. xi	9 May 1961
An Act to provide for the removal of certain restrictions attaching to lands forming part of the Close of the Cathedral Church of the Holy Trinity and of Saint Peter and Saint Paul and of Saint Swithun in Winchester, to authorise the use of the said lands for building and other purposes and the disposal thereof; and for other purposes.
Clerical, Medical and General Life Assurance Act 1961	9 & 10 Eliz. 2. c. xii	9 May 1961
An Act to provide for the control and management of the Clerical, Medical and General Life Assurance Society as a Mutual Society; for the substitution of Loan Stock for the Share Capital of the Society; and for other purposes.
Great Northern London Cemetery Company Act 1961	9 & 10 Eliz. 2. c. xiii	9 May 1961
An Act to authorise the Great Northern London Cemetery Company to sell certain lands; and for other purposes.
Lancashire Quarter Sessions Act 1961	9 & 10 Eliz. 2. c. xiv	9 May 1961
An Act to make further provision as to the chairmen and deputy chairmen of courts of quarter sessions holden for the county palatine of Lancaster; and for other purposes.
Berkshire and Buckinghamshire County Councils (Windsor-Eton Bridge, &c.) Act 1961	9 & 10 Eliz. 2. c. xv	18 May 1961
An Act to provide for the construction and maintenance of a bridge in the counties of Berks and Buckingham across the river Thames with approach roads thereto, to make further provision for the construction of bridges across the river Thames, to confer further powers on the county councils of the administrative counties of Berks and Buckingham, to make provision with reference to the powers and constitution of the Bucks Water Board; and for other purposes.
Holy Trinity Brompton Act 1961	9 & 10 Eliz. 2. c. xvi	22 June 1961
An Act to authorise the trustees in whom is vested the parsonage house for the parish of Holy Trinity Brompton in the royal borough of Kensington to pay the proceeds of sale of such parsonage house to the parochial church council of the said parish, to authorise the erection on part of the churchyard of the said parish of buildings to be used for the purpose of a parsonage house and for other purposes connected with the said parish; and for other purposes.
British Transport Commission Order Confirmation Act 1961	9 & 10 Eliz. 2. c. xvii	19 July 1961
An Act to confirm a Provisional Order under the Private Legislation Procedure (Scotland) Act, 1936, relating to the British Transport Commission.
	British Transport Commission Order 1961 Provisional Order to empower the British Transport Commission to construct a railway and to acquire lands, to confer further powers on the Commission and for other purposes.	
Montrose Burgh and Harbour (Amendment) Order Confirmation Act 1961	9 & 10 Eliz. 2. c. xviii	19 July 1961
An Act to confirm a Provisional Order under the Private Legislation Procedure (Scotland) Act, 1936, relating to Montrose Burgh and Harbour.
	Montrose Burgh and Harbour (Amendment) Order 1961 Provisional Order to authorise the Town Council of Montrose to levy an increased Harbour Guarantee Rate and to remove the restriction on the rate of interest authorised in ascertaining any deficiency in the Harbour revenues and for other purposes.	
Argyll County Council (Arinagour and Craignure Piers, etc.) Order Confirmation Act 1961	9 & 10 Eliz. 2. c. xix	19 July 1961
An Act to confirm a Provisional Order under the Private Legislation Procedure (Scotland) Act, 1936, relating to Argyll County Council (Arinagour and Craignure Piers, etc.).
	Argyll County Council (Arinagour and Craignure Piers, etc.) Order 1961 Provisional Order to authorise the County Council of the county of Argyll to construct a new pier and an access road in connection therewith at Arinagour in the parish and Island of Coll and a new pier and approach thereto at Craignure in the parish of Torosay in the Island of Mull and to confer further powers on the said County Council with respect to the said piers and for other purposes.	
National Trust for Scotland Order Confirmation Act 1961	9 & 10 Eliz. 2. c. xx	19 July 1961
An Act to confirm a Provisional Order under the Private Legislation Procedure (Scotland) Act, 1936, relating to the National Trust for Scotland.
	National Trust for Scotland Order 1961 Provisional Order to amend the provisions of the National Trust for Scotland Orders, 1935 to 1952, and to make further provision with respect to the National Trust for Scotland for Places of Historic Interest or Natural Beauty.	
Forth Road Bridge Order Confirmation Act 1961	9 & 10 Eliz. 2. c. xxi	19 July 1961
An Act to confirm a Provisional Order under the Private Legislation Procedure (Scotland) Act, 1936, relating to the Forth Road Bridge.
	Forth Road Bridge Order 1961 Provisional Order to authorise the Forth Road Bridge Joint Board to acquire additional lands and to construct further works; to confer further powers on the said Board; and for other purposes.	
Birmingham Corporation Act 1961	9 & 10 Eliz. 2. c. xxii	19 July 1961
An Act to provide for the removal of certain restrictions attaching to Cannon Hill Park in the city of Birmingham, and to confer powers upon the lord mayor, aldermen and citizens of that city with regard thereto, and for other purposes.
Saint Benet Sherehog Churchyard Act 1961	9 & 10 Eliz. 2. c. xxiii	19 July 1961
An Act to authorise the sale of the churchyard appurtenant to the former church of Saint Benet Sherehog in the city of London, to authorise the erection of buildings thereon; and for other purposes.
Saint Pancras, Pancras Lane, Churchyard Act 1961	9 & 10 Eliz. 2. c. xxiv	19 July 1961
An Act to authorise the sale of the churchyard appurtenant to the former church of Saint Pancras, Pancras Lane, in the city of London, to authorise the erection of buildings thereon; and for other purposes.
Dartford Tunnel Act 1961	9 & 10 Eliz. 2. c. xxv	19 July 1961
An Act to amend the Dartford Tunnel Acts, 1930 to 1957, with respect to tolls and charges and in other respects; to provide for the abolition of the Dartford Tunnel Committee and the appointment of a joint committee; to confer further powers and to make further provisions with respect to the undertaking authorised by the said Acts; and for other purposes.
Sutton Coldfield Corporation Act 1961	9 & 10 Eliz. 2. c. xxvi	19 July 1961
An Act to empower the mayor, aldermen and burgesses of the borough of Sutton Coldfield to execute works for the improvement of Plants Brook; and for other purposes.
London County Council (Money) Act 1961	9 & 10 Eliz. 2. c. xxvii	19 July 1961
An Act to regulate the expenditure on capital account and lending of money by the London County Council during the financial period from the first day of April, nineteen hundred and sixty-one, to the thirtieth day of September, nineteen hundred and sixty-two, and for other purposes.
City of London (Various Powers) Act 1961	9 & 10 Eliz. 2. c. xxviii	19 July 1961
An Act to authorise the Corporation of London to acquire land and to construct street works for the purposes of Spitalfields Market and to make other provision with respect thereto, and further provision with respect to public health, the London Central Markets and for other purposes.
Manchester Corporation Act 1961	9 & 10 Eliz. 2. c. xxix	19 July 1961
An Act to empower the lord mayor, aldermen and citizens of the city of Manchester to acquire lands and construct works in the city, to provide for the abandonment of the construction of the street works authorised by the Manchester Corporation Act, 1958, to make further provision with reference to the local government and finances of the city; and for other purposes.
Stationers' and Newspaper Makers' Company Act 1961	9 & 10 Eliz. 2. c. xxx	19 July 1961
An Act to provide for the redemption and extinguishment of the stock known as the English stock of the Master and Keepers or Wardens and Commonalty of the Mistery or Art of a Stationer and Newspaper Maker of the city of London, to provide compensation for persons affected thereby and to make provision for charities; and for other purposes.
River Wear Watch (Dissolution) Act 1961	9 & 10 Eliz. 2. c. xxxi	19 July 1961
An Act to provide for the cesser of the functions of the Commissioners of the River Wear Watch and the dissolution of those Commissioners, to make provisions consequential thereon; and for other purposes.
Eyemouth Harbour Order Confirmation Act 1961	9 & 10 Eliz. 2. c. xxxii	27 July 1961
An Act to confirm a Provisional Order under the Private Legislation Procedure (Scotland) Act, 1936, relating to Eyemouth Harbour.
	Eyemouth Harbour Order 1961 Provisional Order to authorise the Eyemouth Harbour Trustees to acquire lands and to carry out works for the improvement of Eyemouth Harbour and to borrow money and for other purposes.	
British Transport Commission (No. 2) Order Confirmation Act 1961	9 & 10 Eliz. 2. c. xxxiii	27 July 1961
An Act to confirm a Provisional Order under the Private Legislation Procedure (Scotland) Act, 1936, relating to the British Transport Commission.
	British Transport Commission (No. 2) Order 1961 Provisional Order to authorise the closing and abandonment by the British Transport Commission of the port and harbour of Alloa.	
Pier and Harbour Order (Exmouth) Confirmation Act 1961	9 & 10 Eliz. 2. c. xxxiv	27 July 1961
An Act to confirm a Provisional Order made by the Minister of Transport under the General Pier and Harbour Act, 1861, relating to Exmouth.
	Exmouth Docks Order 1961 Provisional Order to authorise the Exmouth Docks Company to increase the maximum rates authorised by the Exmouth Docks Act, 1864, and for other purposes.	
Teesside Railless Traction Board (Additional Route) Order Confirmation Act 1961	9 & 10 Eliz. 2. c. xxxv	27 July 1961
An Act to confirm a Provisional Order made by the Minister of Transport under the North Ormesby South Bank Normanby and Grangetown Railless Traction Act, 1912, relating to Teesside Railless Traction Board trolley vehicles.
	Teesside Railless Traction Board (Additional Route) Order 1961 Provisional Order authorising the Teesside Railless Traction Board to use trolley vehicles upon an additional route in the urban district of Eston in the North Riding of the County of York.	
British Transport Commission Act 1961	9 & 10 Eliz. 2. c. xxxvi	27 July 1961
An Act to empower the British Transport Commission to construct works and to acquire lands, to authorise the closing to navigation of portions of certain canals, to enact schemes for the redevelopment of parts of the Ashton Canal and the Dearne and Dove Canal, to extend the time for the compulsory purchase of certain lands and the completion of certain works, to confer further powers on the Commission, and for other purposes.
Middlesex County Council Act 1961	9 & 10 Eliz. 2. c. xxxvii	27 July 1961
An Act to make further provision for the disposal of sewage in the county of Middlesex and parts of adjoining counties, to confer further powers upon the Middlesex County Council and the local authorities in Middlesex in relation to the health, local government, improvement and finances of the county and the boroughs and districts therein; and for other purposes.
Shakespeare Birthplace, &c., Trust Act 1961	9 & 10 Eliz. 2. c. xxxviii	27 July 1961
An Act to redefine and extend the objects of the Shakespeare Birthplace Trust; to vary the constitution of the trustees of the said trust and to extend the powers of the trustees; to repeal the provisions of the Shakespeare Birthplace, &c., Trust Act, 1891, and the Shakespeare Birthplace, &c., Trust (Amendment) Act, 1930, and to re-enact subject to variations certain of the provisions of those Acts; and for other purposes.
Glasgow Corporation Order Confirmation Act 1961	9 & 10 Eliz. 2. c. xxxix	3 August 1961
An Act to confirm a Provisional Order under the Private Legislation Procedure (Scotland) Act, 1936, relating to Glasgow Corporation.
	Glasgow Corporation Order 1961 Provisional Order to extend the time for the compulsory purchase of lands for the construction of the sewers authorised by the Glasgow Corporation Sewage Order 1950 and by the Glasgow Corporation Order 1953; to revive the powers of the Corporation of the City of Glasgow for the compulsory acquisition of certain lands and to authorise the shutting up of a portion of Ferryden Street in the city and royal burgh of Glasgow; to confer powers on the Corporation and to make provision with respect to certain public halls vested in the Corporation; to enact provisions with respect to the finances of the city; and for other purposes.	
Poole Corporation Act 1961	9 & 10 Eliz. 2. c. xl	3 August 1961
An Act to confer further powers upon the mayor, aldermen and burgesses of the borough of Poole, to make further provision for the improvement, health, local government and finances of the borough; and for other purposes.
Port of London Act 1961	9 & 10 Eliz. 2. c. xli	3 August 1961
An Act to confer further powers on the Port of London Authority; and for other purposes.
Great Ouse Water Act 1961	9 & 10 Eliz. 2. c. xlii	3 August 1961
An Act to constitute the Great Ouse Water Authority consisting of representatives of the Lee Valley Water Company, the Luton Water Company, the Mid-Northamptonshire Water Board, the North Bedfordshire Water Board and the county councils of the administrative counties of Bedford and Huntingdon for the provision of supplies of water in bulk to the said companies and boards and to other statutory water undertakers supplying water in the said counties and elsewhere, to authorise the Great Ouse Water Authority, the Lee Valley Water Company, the Luton Water Company, the Mid-Northamptonshire Water Board and the North Bedfordshire Water Board to acquire lands and to construct waterworks, to confer powers upon the Great Ouse Water Authority and upon certain of the constituent authorities thereof, including increased charging powers; and for other purposes.
London County Council (General Powers) Act 1961	9 & 10 Eliz. 2. c. xliii	3 August 1961
An Act to confer further powers upon the London County Council and other authorities; and for other purposes.
Bristol Corporation Act 1961	9 & 10 Eliz. 2. c. xliv	3 August 1961
An Act to authorise the lord mayor aldermen and burgesses of the city of Bristol to increase certain of the maximum rates, dues, tolls and charges leviable in respect of their dock undertaking and to re-enact with amendments certain of the statutory powers relating to such rates, dues, tolls and charges and to the licensing of craft; to confer further powers upon them with reference to their dock undertaking; and for other purposes.
Devon County Council Act 1961	9 & 10 Eliz. 2. c. xlv	3 August 1961
An Act to confer further powers on the Devon County Council and on local and highway authorities in the administrative county of Devon in relation to lands and highways and the local government, improvement, health and finances of the county, to confer further powers on the Exmouth Urban District Council with regard to pleasure grounds and on the Teignmouth Urban District Council with regard to their ferry undertaking; and for other purposes.
River Ravensbourne, &c., (Improvement and Flood Prevention) Act 1961	9 & 10 Eliz. 2. c. xlvi	3 August 1961
An Act to confer powers upon the London County Council and the Kent County Council for the improvement and protection of, and the prevention of flooding from, the river Ravensbourne and its tributaries, and for purposes connected therewith.
Newport Corporation Act 1961	9 & 10 Eliz. 2. c. xlvii	3 August 1961
An Act to provide for the construction and maintenance of a bridge across the river Usk in the county borough of Newport with approach roads and other works; and for other purposes.
