= Glanville, Calvados =

Glanville
- Commune
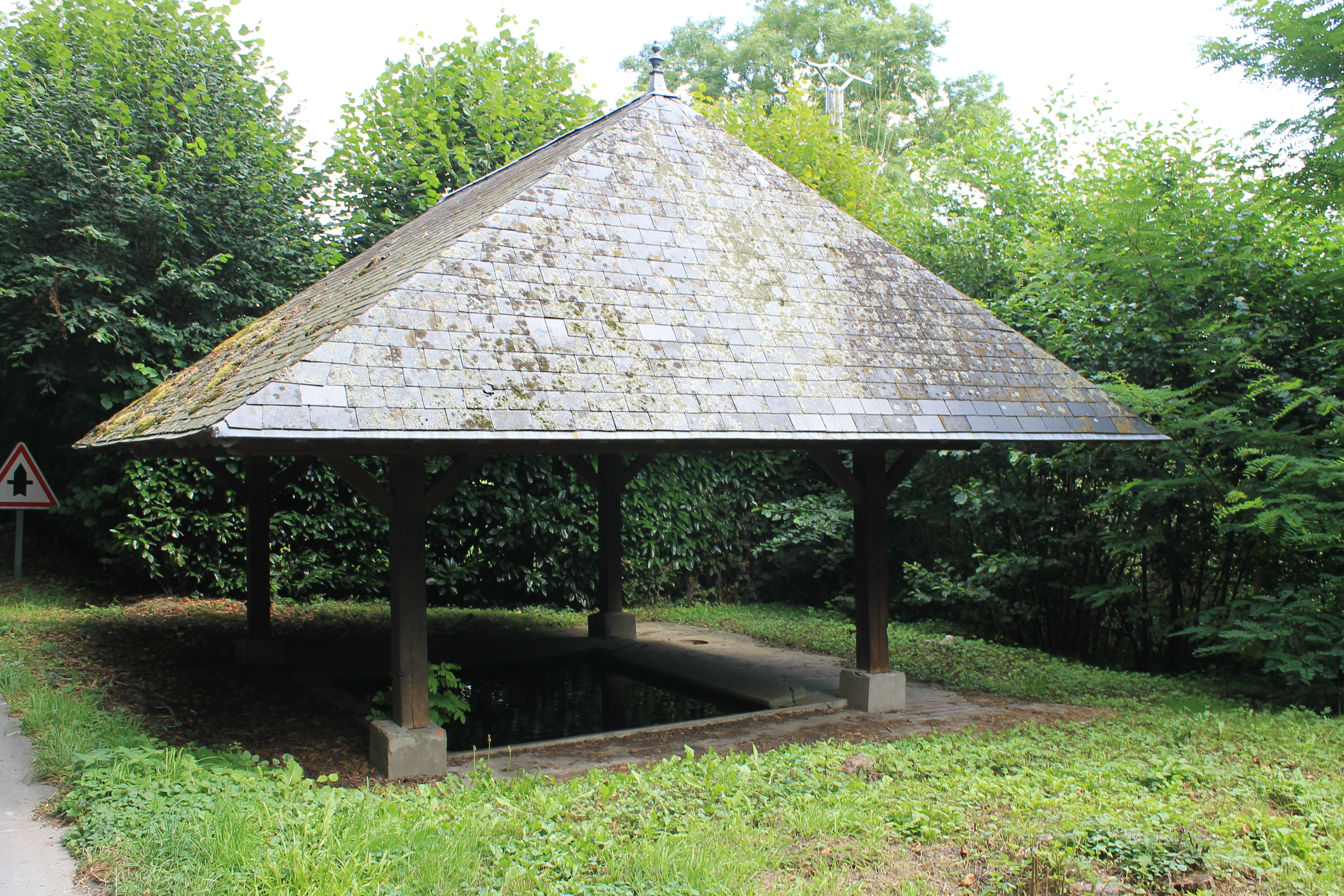
- The washhouse in Glanville
- Location of Glanville
- Location within France Location within Normandy
- Coordinates: 49°17′02″N 0°04′20″E
- Country: France
- Region: Normandy
- Department: Calvados
- Arrondissement: Lisieux
- Canton: Pont-l'Évêque
- Intercommunality: CC Terre d'Auge

Government
  - Mayor (2020–2026): Martine Martin
- Area^{1}: 6.43 km^{2} (2.48 sq mi)
- Elevation: 61 m (200 ft)
- Highest elevation: 142 m (466 ft)
- Lowest elevation: 38 m (125 ft)
- Population (2023): 158
  - Density: 24.6/km^{2} (63.6/sq mi)
- Time zone: UTC+01:00 (CET)
  - Summer (DST): UTC+02:00 (CEST)
- INSEE/Postal code: 14302 /14950
- ^{1} French Land Register data, which excludes lakes, ponds, glaciers > 1 km^{2} (0.386 sq mi or 247 acres) and river estuaries.

Glanville (French pronunciation: [ɡlɑ̃vil]) is a commune in the Calvados department in the Normandy region in northwestern France. Its postal code is 14950.

The name comes from Glandevilla, written in Latin in a document in 1079. Male Germanic name Glando and old French ville "farm".

The de Glanville family was from this village.

== Population ==
Historical population
| Year | Pop. | ±% p.a. |
|---|---|---|
| 1968 | 169 | — |
| 1975 | 144 | −2.26% |
| 1982 | 126 | −1.89% |
| 1990 | 133 | +0.68% |
| 1999 | 165 | +2.42% |
| 2007 | 177 | +0.88% |
| 2012 | 174 | −0.34% |
| 2017 | 172 | −0.23% |
| 2023 | 158 | −1.41% |
Source: INSEE

== Sights ==
The Villa Sayer (1975) is the only house built by the great architect Marcel Breuer in France.

== See also ==
- Communes of the Calvados department
