= Legal Services Consultative Panel =

The Legal Services Consultative Panel is an advisory body of the United Kingdom government tasked with advising the Lord Chancellor on the regulation and training of lawyers and other figures offering legal services. Established by Section 35 of the Access to Justice Act 1999, the body came into existence on 1 January 2000 and replaced the Lord Chancellor's Advisory Committee on Legal Education and Conduct (ACLEC).
