= Haras de la Huderie =

Coordinates: 49.2757°N 0.0789°E

Haras de la Huderie is a Bauhaus residence, situated in Glanville, Calvados at 9 kilometres from Deauville, France.

== Residence ==
The principal residence, known as Villa Sayer is unusual for this region and is the work of Bauhaus architect, Marcel Breuer seconded by his Parisian associate Mario Jossa. It is Breuer's only private residence in France. Constructed from 1972 to 1974 by its owners, it illustrates a harmony between architecture and environment. It is a transparent house.

For the roof, the shape of a double hyperbolic parabolic, the architect employs prestressed concrete, Cables are linked to exterior pillars of bush hammered concrete. The exterior uses white concrete, either bush hammered, in the form of boards, or alternatively vertical and horizontal. Like the exterior, the interior details, chimney, stairs, drawings on doors, the coating of the floor and walls were selected by mutual agreement between the owners and Breuer. The smallest details were the object of multiple plans being sent nearly everyday from the office in New York. In 1992 it was registered at the supplementary inventory of historical monuments and has been classed as a historical monument since 2005.

== Marcel Breuer ==
The 1953 commission for UNESCO headquarters in Paris was a turning point for Breuer: a return to Europe, a return to larger projects after years of only residential commissions, and the beginning of Breuer's adoption of concrete as his primary medium. He became known as one of the leading practitioners of Brutalism, with an increasingly curvy, sculptural, personal idiom. Windows were often set in soft, pillowy depressions rather than sharp, angular recesses. Many architects remarked on his ability to make concrete appear "soft".

== Bibliography ==
Books about Marcel Breuer:among others:

- Projets et réalisations récentes, par Tician Papachristou,1970, éditions Vincent Fréal: projet pour une maison non réalisée dans le Connecticut.
- Breuer Houses, by Joachim Driller, 2000, Edition Phaidon: Villa Saïer
- Marcel Breuer, The career and the buildings, by Isabelle Hyman, 2001, Harry, N, Abrams, publisher, Saier House.
- Ministère de la Culture France: Monuments Historiques du 20° siècle en Basse. Normandie, 2010, par Eric Diouris, Frédéric Henriot, Alain Nafilyan.

Publications:

- L'oeil. mai 1975
- Villa Giardini, 1977
- Industria Italiana del cimento, mars 1978
- Construction Moderne, 1975
- Architectural Record, aout 1977
- Ouest France, 14 septembre 1996
- Paris-Turf, 27 Août 1999.
- Revue du Pays d'Auge: Regards sur l'architecture contemporaine, mars-avril 2011
