= Lord Chancellor's Advisory Committee on Legal Education and Conduct =

The Lord Chancellor's Advisory Committee on Legal Education and Conduct (ACLEC) was an advisory board established by the Courts and Legal Services Act 1990 and tasked with assisting in "the maintenance and development of standards in the education, training and conduct of those offering legal services". It was broken up in 1999, and replaced by the Legal Services Consultative Panel.

== History ==
ACLEC was established by Section 19 of Part II of the Courts and Legal Services Act 1990 after being proposed in the Green Paper The Work and Organisation of the Legal Profession. The body officially came into existence in April 1991, and undertook its first major task in 1992 when it began reviewing the state of legal education in England and Wales. After two consultation papers in 1994 it published a pair of full reports in 1995, titled Access to and participation in undergraduate legal education and Funding legal education. The Committee issued two more reports - First report on legal education and training in 1996 and Continuing professional development for solicitors and barristers

In 1999 ACLEC was abolished by Statutory Instrument 1999/3296 (The Lord Chancellor's Advisory Committee on Legal Education and Conduct (Provisions on Abolition) Order 1999) and replaced by the Legal Services Consultative Panel, an organisation within the Lord Chancellor's Department.

== Structure ==
The Committee consisted of a chairman (who must be a Lord of Appeal in Ordinary, Lord Justice of Appeal or a High Court judge) and sixteen other members, all appointed by the Lord Chancellor. The first chairman appointed was Lord Griffiths, a Lord of Appeal in Ordinary. The sixteen other members were divided so that one was a Circuit Judge or former Circuit Judge, two were practising barristers, two were practising solicitors, two were law teachers or lecturers and nine were "lay members", which is defined as any person other than a judge, practising barrister, practising solicitor or law teacher.

Section 19 of the Courts and Legal Services Act amended the House of Commons Disqualification Act 1975 to indicate that no Member of Parliament can be a member of the Advisory Committee. Committee members served for five years, and provisions were made for them to be paid and for them to maintain a staff, all of which was paid for from the Lord Chancellor's budget. The Committee was required to produce an annual report, which the Lord Chancellor presented to both the House of Lords and the House of Commons.

== Remit ==
ACLEC was tasked with assisting in "the maintenance and development of standards in the education, training and conduct of those offering legal services". The Committee reviewed the practical and academic education and training required and possessed by those providing legal services, and was expected to pay particular attention to the way legal services were provided for those with "special difficulties", such as those who are developmentally disabled.

== Bibliography ==
- Merricks, Walter; Russell Wallman (1990). The Courts and Legal Services Act - A Solicitor's Guide. London: The Law Society. ISBN 1-85328-053-4.
- White, Robin (1991). A Guide to the Courts and Legal Services Act 1990. London: Fourmat Publishing. ISBN 1-85190-120-5.
