= Call to the bar =

Authorization to practice as a barrister

The call to the bar is the process by which a person is admitted to practise as a barrister in many common-law jurisdictions. The requirements, terminology and legal effect of a call to the bar vary considerably between jurisdictions, particularly where the legal profession is divided between barristers and solicitors. In some jurisdictions with a fused legal profession, lawyers are instead admitted or enrolled to practise, although the term call to the bar continues to be used in certain contexts or ceremonial settings.

== Background ==
The legal term of art, call to the bar, is used in most common law jurisdictions; in such jurisdictions, people must first be qualified to be allowed to argue in court on behalf of another party and are then said to have been "called to the bar" or to have received "call to the bar".

"The bar" is now used as a collective noun for barristers; literally, earlier, it referred to the wooden barrier in old courtrooms, which separated the often crowded public area at the rear from the space near the judges reserved for those having business with the court; barristers would sit or stand immediately behind it, facing the judge, and could use it as a table for their briefs.

Like many other common law terms, the title term, call to the bar, originated in England in the Middle Ages, in reference to the summons issued to one found fit to speak at the "bar" of the royal courts. In time, English judges allowed only legally qualified men to address them on the law and later delegated the qualification and admission of barristers to the four Inns of Court. Once an inn calls one of its members to its bar, they are thereafter a barrister. They may not, however, practise as a barrister until they have completed (or been exempted from) an apprenticeship called pupillage. After completing pupillage, they are considered to be a practising barrister with a right of audience before all courts.

England and Wales and some other jurisdictions distinguish two types of lawyers, who are regulated by different bodies, with separate training, examinations, regulation and traditions:

- barristers, who primarily practise in court and generally specialise in advocacy in a particular field of law; they have a right of audience in all courts of England and Wales; and
- solicitors, who do not necessarily undertake court work, but have a right of audience in the lower courts (magistrates' courts and county courts). They are admitted or enrolled as a solicitor, to conduct litigation and practise in law outside court, e.g., providing legal advice to lay clients and acting on their behalf in legal matters. A solicitor must qualify as a solicitor-advocate in order to acquire the same "higher rights" of audience as a barrister.

In other jurisdictions, the terminology and the degree of overlap between the roles of solicitor and barrister varies greatly; in some, the distinction has disappeared entirely.

== Particular jurisdictions ==
Common law jurisdictions include Australia, England and Wales, New Zealand, Canada, Hong Kong, India, Nigeria, the Republic of Ireland, Northern Ireland and most jurisdictions in the Commonwealth of Nations and the United States (the See also section below contains links to articles on the laws of these jurisdictions).

=== Australia ===
In Australia, the status of the legal profession differs from state to state:

- Queensland and New South Wales formally split the legal profession between solicitors and barristers;
- South Australia, Victoria, Western Australia and the Australian Capital Territory have "fused" the professions of barrister and solicitor, but each state maintains an independent bar for lawyers who solely practice as barristers; and
- Tasmania and the Northern Territory have fused professions, with a very small number of legal practitioners operating as an independent bar.

Most Australian barristers will have previously worked as solicitors prior to becoming barristers.

Candidates wishing to become barristers may have to pass an examination and undergo further specialised training before those candidates are "called to the bar" or "sign the roll of counsel". Both the examination and the further training are administered by the state's bar association:

- in Queensland, candidates must pass "three 1.5 hour examinations, focusing on legal ethics, practice and procedure, and evidence", and then successfully complete the Bar Practice Course;
- in New South Wales, candidates must pass the NSW Bar Examination, and then successfully complete the Bar Practice Course; and
- in Victoria, candidates must pass the Victorian Bar Entrance Exam, and then successfully complete the Victorian Bar Readers' Course.

Upon completing the relevant training course, new barristers ("readers") are required to spend a period of months "reading" in the chambers of an experienced barrister, called the reader's "tutor" (in New South Wales) or "mentor" (in Victoria) (historically, this experienced barrister was called the new barrister's "pupil master"). This "reading" period serves as a kind of practical apprenticeship for the new barrister, who works in the same chambers as their tutor/mentor and is able to learn by observing their tutor/mentor, as well as actively seeking their guidance.

=== Canada ===
In common law Canadian provinces, despite the unified legal profession (lawyers are qualified as both barristers and solicitors), the certificate issued by the provincial Law Society to the newly qualified lawyer generally indicates their having been called to the bar and admitted as a solicitor.

In Ontario and Manitoba, there are two certificates, one issued by the respective provincial Law Society for call to the bar and the other by the Superior Court (Ontario) or Court of King's Bench (Manitoba) for admission as a solicitor.

In Ontario, being called to the bar requires students to article (apprentice) with a law firm for ten months, but due to a shortage of articling positions available each year and an influx of articling candidates, a pilot alternative program available through the University of Ottawa and Toronto Metropolitan University was established. The Law Practice Program requires the articling students to spend four months in a virtual law office and to spend another four months in a work placement.

Alberta and Prince Edward Island are the only common law jurisdictions with individual, rather than group, calls. The student's supervisor, referred to as their principal, makes an oral application to the Provincial Court of Alberta or Court of King's Bench, or the Supreme Court of Prince Edward Island, respectively, to have the student called to the bar. Gowns are worn and the ceremony is public, with the presiding judge (or judges) welcoming the new member with a speech written specifically for that call.

In Quebec, a civil law notary is very similar to a solicitor.

=== England and Wales ===
In England and Wales, a call ceremony takes place at the barrister's Inn of Court (or at Temple Church for members of the Inner Temple), before or during the pupillage year. A barrister is called to the Utter ("outer") Bar and those appointed as King's Counsel (Queen's Counsel if the monarch is female) are entitled to plead from "within the Bar" in court.

=== Hong Kong ===
In Hong Kong, the legal profession is split between barristers and solicitors. Barristers are represented by the Hong Kong Bar Association while Solicitors are represented by the Law Society of Hong Kong. These two bodies also regulate their respective professions and decide on admissions for barristers or solicitors.

All persons wishing to become either a barrister or solicitor must have first completed a Bachelor of Laws or Juris Doctor degree in Hong Kong, or equivalent in other jurisdictions, alongside the Postgraduate Certificate in Laws (PCLL). Those holding a foreign law degree must complete the PCLL conversion exam administered by the Law Society of Hong Kong before being permitted to take the course. Following so, those looking to be a barrister must then complete at least a year long pupilage, where at least 3 months are on the civil and 3 months on criminal practice. (Note: Pupil barristers are legally qualified to practice after six months of pupilage, but the Bar Association requires a year of pupilage before admittance into the Bar List. Pupil barristers will hence be practicing under supervision for the remainder of their pupilage.) Those looking to be solicitors must complete a two-year traineeship with a law firm in Hong Kong. (Note: A student must, in practice, secure a trainee contract during their penultimate or final year, usually through a vacation scheme with the firm. Some firms also take in PCLL students.) After having fulfilled the respective requirements, they may then be admitted as barristers or solicitors of the High Court of Hong Kong.

For foreign practicing barristers wishing to practice in Hong Kong as barristers, they must have practiced for at least 3 years and passed the Barrister Qualifying Examination before being allowed to start their pupilage. This is not required for currently practicing solicitors and legal officers in the government that wish to become barristers.

A foreign barrister may apply for ad-hoc admission to the Hong Kong Bar Association for a particular case or cases in Hong Kong. This is under the premises that the qualification acquired outside Hong Kong to engage in would be similar to that undertaken by a barrister in his practice in the Higher courts of Hong Kong; and the person has had substantial experience in advocacy in a court, where the Court may impose restrictions and conditions as they see fit.

As in other common law jurisdictions, barristers and legal practitioners engaged in advocacy, after having practiced for at least ten years, may be selected by the Chief Justice to become Senior Counsel, which is known as "taking silk" or being "called to the inner bar". Senior Counsel were similarly appointed as Queen's Counsel and King's Counsel in Hong Kong as they were in England and Wales prior to the Handover in 1997. Visiting King's Counsel and Senior Counsel of other common law jurisdictions are accorded the same status and rights as Senior Counsel in Hong Kong.

A solicitor may choose to become a solicitor-advocate, giving them a higher right of audience allowing them to appear in all levels of court in Hong Kong, which its qualification is administered by the Higher Rights Assessment Board. One may apply to the board after having practiced law for at least 5 years in the past 7 years, which the latest 2 must have been in Hong Kong. One may either apply by exemption or by assessment, but not both at the same time, which they may do so only once every year.

=== Ireland ===
In Ireland, the legal profession is split between solicitors and barristers. Candidates wishing to qualify as barristers must complete a series of examinations at the Honorable Society of King's Inns. Successful candidates are called to the Bar by the Chief Justice in the Supreme Court. Upon being called to the bar, a barrister becomes a member of the Outer Bar, or "Junior Counsel". Some barristers may subsequently be called to the Inner Bar in a similar ceremony, gaining the title "Senior Counsel".

=== New Zealand ===
As in Canada, the legal profession is fused. A lawyer in New Zealand is admitted as either a "barrister sole" or a "barrister and solicitor of the High Court of New Zealand". Once admitted, New Zealand's "barrister and solicitors" are able to practise in either mode provided they hold a practising certificate, while barristers sole are entitled only to practice as a barrister. Admission is overseen by the New Zealand Law Society.

=== Nigeria ===
As in New Zealand, there is no formal distinction between barristers and solicitors. A lawyer in Nigeria is admitted as a "Barrister and Solicitor of the Supreme Court of Nigeria". Once admitted, Nigerian lawyers may argue in any federal trial or appellate court as well as any of the courts in Nigeria's thirty six states and the Federal Capital Territory. Lawyers are regulated by the Nigerian Bar Association.

=== Northern Ireland ===
Prior to the partition of Ireland, barristers in what is now Northern Ireland were called to the bar in the same manner as those in the rest of Ireland. The procedure remains much the same today, save that candidates wishing to qualify as barristers must complete a series of examinations at the Institute of Professional Legal Studies at Queen's University Belfast (under the supervision of the Honourable Society of the Inn of Court of Northern Ireland), barristers are called to the bar by the Lord Chief Justice of Northern Ireland and members of the Inner Bar choose whether to be known as King's Counsel or Senior Counsel.

=== Sri Lanka ===
In Sri Lanka, a lawyer must be admitted and enrolled as an attorney-at-law of the Supreme Court of Sri Lanka. This is referred to as the call to the bar.

=== United States ===
Generally, lawyer qualification is a U.S. state matter and a lawyer is said to have been "admitted to the bar" and become an "attorney at law"; some states still use the older term "attorney and counselor (also spelled 'counsellor') at law", upon taking their oath of office. Historically, the institution of attorney was similar to that of the solicitor, whereas the office of the counselor was almost identical to that of the barrister, but today this distinction has disappeared.

== See also ==
- Admission to the bar
- Bar (law)
- Bar association
- Bar council
- Election to the Faculty of Advocates, Scotland
- Law of Australia
- Law of Canada
- Law of England and Wales
- Law of Hong Kong
- Law of India
- Law of New Zealand
- Law of Northern Ireland
- Law of the Republic of Ireland
- Politics of Nigeria
