= Glanville Davies affair =

Scandal in the English legal profession

The Glanville Davies affair was a scandal in the English legal profession which resulted in greater reform of the regulatory processes for solicitors and was one of the justifications for the Courts and Legal Services Act 1990. Glanville Davies was a well-respected solicitor and a member of the Council of the Law Society of England and Wales who massively overcharged his client, Leslie Persons, sending him a bill for £197,000 that was reduced on taxation to £67,000. Davies was not punished by the Law Society's internal regulatory committees, which allowed him to resign from the council on the grounds of ill-health with his reputation intact. Following litigation and public criticism, the Law Society commissioned an internal report that found "administrative failures, wrong decisions, mistakes, errors of judgement, failures in communication and insensitivity". A private member's bill reformed the way in which the Law Society investigated disciplinary complaints, although not to the extent initially proposed, and paved the way for the Courts and Legal Services Act 1990 that created an independent disciplinary body.

== Background ==
In 1982, Leslie Parsons filed a complaint against Glanville Davies, a respected solicitor and member of the Council of the Law Society of England and Wales, the solicitors' professional body. Davies had charged Parsons £197,000 for legal services, a "grossly inflated and inaccurate legal bill". Parsons complained to the Law Society repeatedly from 1976 to 1982; despite this, the Law Society took no disciplinary action, allowing Davies to resign from the council on grounds of ill-health with his reputation intact. Parsons finally brought legal action against Davies in 1982, and on 18 November, Anthony McCowan of the High Court of Justice reduced the bill to £67,000. McCowan also said that Davies was "guilty of at least gross and persistent misconduct" and recommended that he be struck off. On 24 October 1983, Vinelott J struck Davies from the roll of solicitors.

== Investigation ==
Following the start of litigation, an investigation by the Lay Observer and the Law Society itself (which became known as the Ely Report) highlighted "an appalling catalogue of errors, insensitivity and poor judgment" in the handling of the Davies Affair by the Law Society internal disciplinary organisation. The report found "administrative failures, wrong decisions, mistakes, errors of judgement, failures in communication and insensitivity... the whole affair was a disgrace to the Society". The Society paid compensation to Parsons for their mishandling of the situation and said that they would compensate victims of similar cases where they had failed to investigate complaints with reasonable care.

The Law Society asked Coopers & Lybrand to produce a report on the Law Society, which included its disciplinary topics among the areas to be reported on. The draft report, published in 1984, recommended that the Law Society should transfer its disciplinary processes to an independent Solicitor's Complaints Board, which would be made up of both solicitors and lay people (although with a majority of its members being solicitors). In 1985 the National Consumer Council published a survey showing that only 15% of respondents felt that the Law Society should be investigating complaints, and only 5% felt that if an independent body was created it should contain a solicitor majority, with 36% wanting equal representation of solicitors and lay people and 55% preferring a majority of lay people.

== Aftermath ==
As a result of this and similar controversies, Alf Dubs introduced a private member's bill named the Solicitors (Independent Complaints Procedure) Bill on 12 February 1985, which would move the responsibility of regulating the solicitors profession to a body outside the Law Society. Professional opinion was split on this – the National Consumer Council, Legal Action Group and many of the smaller law societies supported the proposal, while larger law societies and the Law Society of England and Wales opposed it.

The Law Society of England and Wales persuaded Coopers & Lybrand to include an alternate reform proposal in their report, and after pressure from the Law Society, and several of the larger regional societies, the alternate proposal was used. This was far weaker than the original proposal, and kept the responsibility of regulating the solicitors' profession within the Law Society but increased the separation of functions within the Society and required that the majority of the people on regulatory committees be lay people (not solicitors). The events surrounding this scandal have been directly linked to the reforms pushed through in the Courts and Legal Services Act 1990, which created an independent disciplinary body for solicitors.

== Bibliography ==
- Abel, Richard (1998). The Making of the English Legal Profession. Beard Books. ISBN 1-58798-250-1.
- Cohen, Harry (1986). "The Necessity for Lawyers and The Law Society in England – A Lesson for the American Legal Profession". The Journal of the Legal Profession. 11. University of Alabama School of Law.
- White, Robin (1991). A Guide to the Courts and Legal Services Act 1990. London: Fourmat Publishing. ISBN 1-85190-120-5.
