= Conveyancer =

Specialist lawyer

In most Commonwealth countries, a conveyancer is a specialist lawyer who specialises in the legal aspects of buying and selling real property, or conveyancing. A conveyancer can also be (but need not be) a solicitor, licensed conveyancer, or a fellow of the Institute of Legal Executives.

In England and Wales, conveyancers are regulated by an official body known as the Council for Licensed Conveyancers. Its main purpose is to set entry standards and regulate the profession of licensed conveyancers effectively in order to secure adequate consumer protection, promote effective competition in the legal services market and provide choice for consumers.

Services offered by conveyancers vary from Residential Conveyancing, Probate and Wills. Strong regulation is imposed to curb unfair practices which include among others false representation, exaction for hidden charges and double dealing.

In Kenya, a conveyancer can only be an admitted advocate holding a valid current practising certificate. The consequences of not holding such a certificate is fatal to any transaction he undertakes on behalf of his client, and will be void. The client is therefore under obligation to do his due diligence by ensuring that his conveyancer has a current valid practising certificate by confirming this with the law society of Kenya. This was authoritatively decided by the Court of Appeal in its decision of National Bank of Kenya Ltd. v. Wilson Ndolo Ayah.

In Australia, a conveyancer is also known as a professional who specialises in property law and is governed by the Conveyancers Licensing Act 2003. Lawyers and conveyancers have the same responsibilities and liabilities when dealing with property matters but, lawyers are permitted to commence legal proceedings against other parties. On the other hand, conveyancers are permitted to hold a trust account and lawyers are required to undertake further study to be permitted to hold a trust account. To become a conveyancer, students must complete the following subjects: contract law, revenue law, mortgage law, land law, agency law, tort in private law and conduct code for conveyancers. A conveyance business must however be authorized in the state or territory where the land is bought or sold.

In Canada, a conveyancer is a legal clerk or a paralegal who assists lawyers in all aspects of conveying real estate.
