= Green paper =

Type of government policy document

In the United Kingdom, the Commonwealth countries, Hong Kong, and the European Union, a green paper is a tentative government report and consultation document of policy proposals for debate and discussion. A green paper represents the best that the government can propose on the given issue, but, as it remains uncommitted, it can without loss of face leave its final decision open until it has been able to consider the public reaction to it. Green papers may result in the production of a white paper. They may be seen as grey literature.

== Canada ==
A green paper in Canada, like a white paper, is an official government document. Green papers tend to be statements not of policy already determined, but of propositions put before the whole nation for discussion. They are produced early in the policy-making process, while ministerial proposals are still being formulated. Many white papers in Canada have been, in effect, green papers, while at least one green paper—that on immigration and population in 1975—was released for public debate after the government had already drafted legislation.

== United Kingdom ==
Similarly, in the UK, green papers are official consultation documents produced by the government for discussion both inside and outside Parliament, for instance when a government department is considering introducing a new law.

The term "green paper" has been said to originate with the publication in 1941 by Herwald Ramsbotham, UK president of the board of education, of plans for educational reform in a green binding, which became known as the "Green Book". According to the BBC, UK green papers are printed on paper of a pale green colour.

== European Union ==
A green paper released by the European Commission is a discussion document intended to stimulate debate and launch a process of consultation, at European level, on a particular topic. A green paper usually presents a range of ideas and is meant to invite interested individuals or organizations to contribute views and information. It may be followed by a white paper, an official set of proposals that is used as a vehicle for their development into law.

== Examples ==
=== Discussion of defence policy in Australia, 2000 ===
A major review of defence policy in Australia culminated in a white paper issued in December 2000. Prior to this, a discussion paper was released in June 2000. This discussion paper was in nature what is known as a green paper (and was sometimes referred to as such).

=== Copyright in the knowledge economy, 2008 ===
The purpose of the 2008 EU green paper on copyright was to foster a debate on how knowledge for research, science and education can best be disseminated in the online environment. The green paper, which was published on 16 July 2008, aimed to set out a number of issues connected with the role of copyright in the "knowledge economy" and intended to launch a consultation on these issues (see this document). The EU asked for answers and comments to be submitted up to 30 November 2008.

== See also ==
- White paper
- Blue book (disambiguation)
- Persuasive writing
