= Fused profession =

Single profession of barrister and solicitor is provided by statute

Fused profession is a term relating to jurisdictions where the legal profession is not divided between barristers and solicitors. Generally, the term is used in the context of Commonwealth countries, where the single profession of barrister and solicitor is provided by statute.

In some jurisdictions (e.g., New South Wales, Queensland in Australia), there is a distinction between barristers and solicitors; legal practitioners must practise as either one or the other, and are members either of the local bar or law society. In other jurisdictions (e.g. Bangladesh, Malaysia, Singapore, the nine common law provinces of Canada, Tasmania, Victoria, South Australia and Western Australia), there is no formal distinction but legal practitioners nonetheless practise as either one or the other.

In Bangladesh, despite having a fused profession, there are separate enrolment rules specifically applicable to individuals called to the Bar in England and Wales, including unregistered Barristers.

The legal profession in the United States is fused; however, an individual licensed to practise law is often formally referred to as an "Attorney and Counselor at Law", a reference back to the days of the split profession, although the terms barrister and solicitor are not typically used. Nonetheless, attorneys within the United States usually must be "admitted to the bar" before being allowed to practise law in a particular jurisdiction.

England and Wales, Scotland, the Republic of Ireland, Northern Ireland, and Hong Kong have all retained separate professions.
