= R. M. Jackson =

British legal scholar (1903–1986)

Richard Meredith Jackson, FBA (19 August 1903 – 8 May 1986) was a British jurist and legal scholar.

He was educated at Leighton Park School and Cambridge University. He became a Fellow of St John's College and Downing Professor of the Laws of England at the University of Cambridge from 1966 to 1970, he devoted his academic career to the study of the administration of justice. One of his most important books was The Machinery of Justice in England, first published in 1940 and now in its eighth edition.

In 1936 he married Jamaican-Chinese barrister and legal scholar Lily Tie Ten Quee, who had studied law at Newnham College, Cambridge.
