= Licensed conveyancer =

Type of specialist legal professional in some countries

A licensed conveyancer is a specialist legal professional in the United Kingdom, New Zealand, Australia or South Africa who has been trained to deal with all aspects of property law.

Typically, their tasks might include:

1. Taking instructions from a client in relation to the sale or purchase of land or property
2. Conducting searches in relation to the property with local authorities
3. Advising clients of any incurred costs such as stamp duty land tax and legal fees
4. Drafting contracts setting out the terms of the sale of a property
5. Liaising with mortgage lenders (banks and building societies) to ensure they have all the relevant information
6. Paying costs on behalf of the client such as stamp duty and estate agent fees

Their role is very similar to that of a solicitor dealing with a property transaction. However, rather than being qualified as a solicitor, they will have completed all of the examinations and practical training provided by a regulatory body for licensed conveyancers.

== England and Wales ==
The regulatory body for licensed conveyancers in England and Wales is the Council for Licensed Conveyancers (CLC), established by the Administration of Justice Act 1985 to maintain consistent standards of professionalism and conduct among persons who practice as licensed conveyancers. Licensed conveyancers are also answerable to the Authorised Conveyancing Practitioners Board.

A licensed conveyancer must be at least 21 years of age and be considered by the CLC to be a fit and proper person to hold a licence. Gaining the licence entails completing the examinations and practical training provided by the CLC.

They may be employed by firms of solicitors or other institutions such as banks and property developers. Alternatively, after holding three consecutive annual (limited) licences and being employed for at least three years, they may apply for a full licence and practise on their own or in a partnership.

A licensed conveyancer holding a limited licence is required to complete eight hours of professional training each year (CPD – continuing professional development). Licensed conveyancers with a full licence must complete 12 hours of professional training each year. A large part of this training must relate to property law and practice.

Like solicitors and barristers, licensed conveyancers are also commissioners for oaths. A commissioner for oaths is a person appointed by the Lord Chancellor with power to administer oaths or take affidavits.

== Australia ==
Conveyancing work may be performed by lawyers and/or licensed conveyancers (people who are not lawyers, but are licensed under the Conveyancers Act 2006 (VIC)).

In Australia, licensed conveyancers are governed by consumer protection legislations and regulators of the various States. Each State and Territory has different legislation governing Licensed Conveyancers.

- In Victoria, a conveyancer must be licensed and are regulated by the Business Licensing Authority (BLA), a division of Consumer Affairs Victoria. Licensed conveyancers must also comply with all requirements pursuant to under the Conveyancers Act 2006 (Victoria).
- In New South Wales (NSW), a conveyancer must hold a license issued by the NSW Fair Trading body. They are regulated by the Conveyancers Licensing Act 2003 and the Conveyancers Licensing Regulation 2015.
- Unlike other Australian states, Queensland does not have a separate licensing system for conveyancers; instead, conveyancing is typically performed by solicitors with a Practising Certificate issued by the Queensland Law Society, as required under the Legal Profession Act 2007 (Qld)

Licensed conveyancers must complete a Diploma or Advanced Diploma in Conveyancing, as well as practical training under the supervision of an Australian Legal Practitioner. They must be 18 years of age and considered able to perform conveyancing tasks. Anyone who is insolvent, under administration, a represented person under the Guardianship and Administration Act 1986, or currently disqualified from holding a conveyancing license, is disqualified.

To be issued with a license, applicants must be approved by the BLA body after application checks and record checks are made.

Conveyancers may be employed by law firms, solicitors, conveyancing firms, banks, and property developers. A conveyancer can also obtain a license to run their own licensed conveyancing business.
