= Legal education in the United Kingdom =

Legal education in the United Kingdom is divided between the common law system of England, Northern Ireland and Wales, and that of Scotland, which uses a hybrid of common law and civil law.

The Universities of Dundee, Glasgow and Strathclyde, in Scotland, are the only universities in the UK to offer a dual-qualifying degree. Dundee also offers a choice of either English/Northern Irish or Scots Law separate LLB degrees. Aberdeen offers a "Law with English Law" course in which Scots Law and English Law is taught.

== England, Wales and Northern Ireland ==
Requirements for becoming a lawyer in England and Wales and in Northern Ireland differ slightly depending on whether the individual plans to become a solicitor or barrister. All prospective lawyers must first however possess a qualifying law degree, or have completed a conversion course. A qualifying law degree in England and Wales must contain modules covering the following subject areas:

- Contract law
- Criminal law
- European Union law
- Land law/Property law
- Public law (Constitutional/Administrative)
- Tort law
- Trusts and Equity

Following graduation, the paths towards qualification as a solicitor or barrister diverge. Prospective solicitors must enrol with the Law Society of England and Wales as a student member and take a one-year course called the Legal Practice Course (LPC), usually followed by two years' apprenticeship, known as a training contract. Prospective barristers must first apply to join one of the four Inns of Court and then complete the one-year Bar Professional Training Course (BPTC), followed by a year training in a set of barristers' chambers, known as pupillage.

=== Qualifying law degrees ===
==== England ====
- Anglia Ruskin University
- Arden University
- Aston University
- University of Bedfordshire
- University of Birmingham
- Birmingham City University
- University of Bolton
- Bournemouth University
- University of Bradford
- Brunel University London
- University of Buckingham
- BPP Law School
- University of Brighton
- University of Bristol
- Bristol Law School, University of the West of England, Bristol
- Faculty of Law, University of Cambridge
- Canterbury Christ Church University
- University of Central Lancashire
- University of Chichester
- University of Chester
- Coventry University
- De Montfort University
- University of Derby
- Durham Law School at Durham University
- UEA Law School at the University of East Anglia
- School of Law and Social Sciences, University of East London
- Edge Hill University
- University of Essex
- University of Exeter
- University of Gloucestershire
- University of Greenwich
- University of Hertfordshire
- University of Huddersfield
- University of Hull
- Keele University
- University of Kent
- Kingston University
- Lancaster University
- University of Leeds
- Leeds Law School, Leeds Beckett University
- University of Leicester
- University of Lincoln
- University of Liverpool
- Liverpool John Moores University
- University of London:
  - Birkbeck, University of London
  - City Law School at the City, University of London
  - The Dickson Poon School of Law, King's College London
  - London School of Economics
  - Royal Holloway, University of London
  - Queen Mary, University of London
  - School of Oriental and African Studies (SOAS)
  - UCL Faculty of Laws, University College London
- London Metropolitan University
- University of Manchester
- Manchester Law School at Manchester Metropolitan University
- Middlesex University
- Newcastle University
- New College of the Humanities
- University of Northampton
- Northumbria University
- University of Nottingham
- Nottingham Law School at Nottingham Trent University
- Open University
- Oxford Brookes University
- Faculty of Law, University of Oxford
- Plymouth University
- University of Portsmouth
- University of Reading
- University of Salford
- University of Sheffield
- Sheffield Hallam University
- Southampton Solent University
- London South Bank University
- University of Southampton
- Staffordshire University
- University of Sunderland
- University of Surrey
- University of Sussex
- Teesside University
- University of Warwick
- University of West London
- University of Westminster
- University of Winchester
- University of Wolverhampton
- University of Worcester
- University of York
- York St John University
- University of Law

==== Northern Ireland ====
- Queen's University Belfast
- Ulster University

==== Wales ====
- Aberystwyth University
- Bangor University
- Cardiff University
- University of South Wales
- Swansea University

== Scotland ==
When the kingdoms of England and Scotland merged to form the Kingdom of Great Britain in 1707, the terms of the 1706 Treaty of Union that led to the union guaranteed that Scotland's legal system would continue, separate from that of England and Wales.

Scots law is founded upon Roman or civil law, although today it has evolved into a pluralistic system, using both civil and common law. As in England and Wales, lawyers in Scotland are divided into two groups: solicitors and advocates. Solicitors are members of the Law Society of Scotland, and are only entitled to practise in the lower courts of Scotland, while advocates are members of the Faculty of Advocates and are permitted to appear in the superior High Court of Justiciary and Court of Session. Membership of either (but only one) body can be attained either by sitting that body's professional exams, or by obtaining exemption through the award of a qualifying law degree and successful completion of the Diploma in Legal Practice.

The Diploma in Legal Practice trains students on the practical elements of being a lawyer in Scotland, and consists of a broad range of compulsory modules.

After completion of the diploma, students wishing to become solicitors undertake a two-year traineeship with a law firm, before being admitted as full members of the Law Society. To become an advocate, students undertake a period of training of twenty-one months with a solicitor, before a further nine month unpaid traineeship with an experienced advocate, known as devilling.

Scottish solicitors and advocates are entitled to practise elsewhere in the European Union, provided that they satisfy the requirements of the relevant EU directives. However, to practise elsewhere in the United Kingdom, further courses and examinations are required.

=== Schools of law ===
The following institutions offer qualifying degrees of Bachelor of Laws (LLB). Those offering the Diploma in Legal Practice are marked with an asterisk (*):

- University of Aberdeen School of Law*
- Abertay University Division of Law
- University of Dundee School of Law*
- University of Edinburgh Law School*
- Edinburgh Napier University
- University of Glasgow School of Law*
- Glasgow Caledonian University
- Robert Gordon University Law School*
- University of Stirling
- University of Strathclyde Law School*

== Alternatives to an (initial) law degree ==
In England and Wales there are also one year conversion courses known as the Common Professional Examination (CPE) or Graduate Diploma in Law (GDL), for non-law graduates as an alternative to the full-length LLB degree course, whilst a number of institutions also offer two-year conversion courses, usually at a lower cost with a more distinguished qualification, such as a master's degree.

Scots law regulations usually require a full LLB qualification. It is possible to complete an honours degree in any other subject, whether in Scotland or elsewhere, and subsequently undertake a qualifying accelerated two-year LLB (which is essentially the first two years of the honours LLB) at several universities including Aberdeen, Caledonian, Dundee, Edinburgh, Glasgow, Strathclyde and Stirling.

== See also ==
- Legal education
- List of law schools in the United Kingdom
- Solicitors Qualifying Examination
