= Legal professions in England and Wales =

Legal professions in England and Wales overwhelmingly consist of two distinct professions: solicitors and barristers. Other common legal professions in England and Wales include legal executives and licensed conveyancers. There are also stately positions which involve legal practice, such as Attorney-General or Director of Public Prosecutions.

== Barristers and solicitors ==
Solicitors provide legal services and legal advice, and operate across a range of practice areas. Although a substantial number of sole practitioners exist, solicitors are usually employed by a law firm. All solicitors and their firms are approved and regulated by the Solicitors Regulation Authority. The Law Society is the professional body representing solicitors.

Barristers are a wholly separate profession to solicitors - they follow different rules and provide different services. They are not usually the first port of call for people seeking legal advice. Instead, they typically receive instructions from a solicitor representing a client, and then represent the client at court and present their case. However, barristers do still advise clients and sometimes initiate legal proceedings on their behalf. All barristers are approved and regulated by the Bar Standards Board, and the Bar Council is the professional body representing barristers.

== Barristers ==
=== Education and organisation ===
Becoming a Barrister requires membership of one of the four Inns of Court in London, namely Lincoln's Inn, Gray's Inn, Inner Temple, and Middle Temple. The Inns provide support for barristers and student barristers through a range of educational activities, lunching and dining facilities, access to common rooms and gardens, and provision of various grants and scholarships. One of the key functions of the Inns is their responsibility for calling barristers to the Bar. Anyone wishing to train for the Bar must join one of the Inns and it is the Inns alone which have the power to call a student to the Bar. Alongside this responsibility, the Inns also have a role in administering disciplinary tribunals to deal with more serious complaints against barristers.

Members can be lawyers or judges and moreover prospective barristers. All four Inns have the Council of Legal Education in common which organizes education and exams of the affiliated law students. The Council of Legal Education and the Board of Examiners jointly regulate entry to the Legal Profession. The role of the Council is to determine the requirements for admission, to approve law courses and practical legal training providers, and to assess the qualifications of overseas practitioners.

The Board determines the eligibility of individual applicants for admission and provides the certificate upon which the Supreme Court relies when admitting an applicant to practice as a lawyer. For studies at an Inn an applicant needs to provide a comprehensive A-level, a good educational background, and an unblemished reputation. During three years of education a student needs to pass two main exams: The first part is theoretical, which university graduates usually are spared. The second part consists of practical courses and is an assumption and obligation for becoming a barrister (Bar Vocational Course). After calling to the bar, a young barrister has to pass a yearlong pupillage with an experienced barrister before being allowed to practice law self-employed.

=== Fields of practice ===
The main actions of barristers involve going to court, especially to the higher courts. They make speeches in front of the court, they write briefs, they give legal advice, and they provide expert opinion for difficult cases. Usually they use briefs of professional clients, solicitors, and accountants. The barristers analyze the briefs and bring the results to the court. At the moment, there are approximately 10,000 barristers in England and Wales. Most of them have their offices in London. Their elite still form the King's Counsels, from which many of the judges for higher courts are chosen. The King's Counsels are publicly known for wearing silk gowns.

Meeting the requirements of the Public Access Scheme enables barristers to accept instructions directly from lay members of the public rather than a professional client.

== Solicitors ==
=== Education and organisation ===
Solicitors have their own professional association called The Law Society, established in 1826. The Solicitors Act 1843 (6 & 7 Vict. c. 73) consolidated enactments relating to the profession.

In order to become a solicitor, trainees usually take a three-year undergraduate law degree (LL.B.) followed by a one-year Legal Practice Course and then, assuming the examinations have been passed, are employed for two years as trainee solicitors, a form of apprenticeship until about 1990 called articled clerk. Those with a degree other than in law must complete a law conversion (Graduate Diploma in Law) one-year course after their degree and before their legal practice course (so 5 years of full time study rather than 4) but still followed by 2 years working as a trainee solicitor in a firm of solicitors. There are some schemes permitting qualification without an undergraduate degree but they are the exception, not the rule. For qualified lawyers from recognised foreign jurisdictions, as well as barristers from England and Wales, the Qualified Lawyers Transfer Scheme (QLTS) was introduced in September 2010 to provide a route to qualify as a solicitor.

From 2022 new post-graduate examinations are planned for those who have not started qualification down the current path under which graduates will need to pass examinations known as SQEI and SQEII either before or during a 2-year period of recognised training similar to the training contract. This is not yet in force. Under the current system after being successful in the examinations and completing satisfactorily the two-year training contract, the candidates may request the Master of the Rolls to admit them as solicitors whereupon they become Solicitors of the Senior Courts of England and Wales.

=== Areas of practice ===
The field of action of a solicitor is versatile and cannot be easily displayed. A solicitor stays in direct contact to their clients and gives them personal legal advice. Clients can be members of the public, businesses, voluntary bodies, charities etc. A solicitor prepares the lawsuit for their clients and represents their parties personally in the lower courts (magistrates' courts, county courts and tribunal). In cases on higher courts (High Court or higher) where a barrister is necessary, a solicitor acts as an agent. Moreover, solicitor's practice is comparable to notary public. Dealing with conveyancing as well as trust businesses, developing last wills, and administrating estates are parts of solicitors' practice.

Furthermore, a solicitor oversees contract conclusion and consulting in various fields of law like tax, competition, insurance, and company law. Profitable real estate businesses makes over 50% of the solicitor's income.

Currently there are approximately 160,000 practising solicitors in England and Wales. 25% are in an employer-employee relationship at companies, bigger solicitor offices or administrations. 75% are self-employed.

=== Sole practitioner ===
A sole practitioner works on his or her own, has no partners, and usually handles smaller cases, most of which dealing with subjects such as family law, employment law, and housing law.

== Other legal professions ==
=== Judge ===
The English legal system requires judges, except for the honorary Justices of the peace at magistrates courts, to first practise for several years as a barrister or solicitor with a good reputation. County-court judges are appointed by the Crown with the suggestion of Lord Chancellor. They have to practise as a barrister or solicitor for at least seven years before they can be appointed. To practise in the High Court, judges need to be proposed by the Lord Chancellor and need to be barristers or solicitors for a minimum of ten years. Judges at the Court of Appeal are appointed by the King as recommended by the Judicial Appointments Commission; they have to have experiences as a barrister or solicitor for 15 years. For the appointment of judges of the House of Lords, it is the same case; moreover, they are appointed as Life Peers.

In order to become a Law Lord, a judge needs to practise for at least 15 years as a barrister or solicitor, or for two years in a high judgeship. The Prime Minister also recommends candidates for Lord Chancellor, Lord Chief Justice, and the Master of the Rolls to the King.

=== Attorney-General and Solicitor-General ===
The Attorney-General advises the Crown in legal issues and acts as plaintiff for the Crown in very important cases. The Attorney-General is a member of the House of Commons and is usually a barrister with high reputation. This is true as well for the solicitor-general, who is the agent of the Attorney-General. Both belong to the ruling party in Parliament. They are appointed by the Prime Minister and must abdicate in case of change in government.

=== Director of Public Prosecutions ===
In general the Director of Public Prosecutions gives advice to police and other law enforcement agencies and is not a political civil servant. To become a Director of Public Prosecutions, applicants need to have at least ten years of practical experience.

=== CILEX Lawyers ===
CILEX Lawyers are members of CILEX (Chartered Institute of Legal Executives), a professional body with a membership of over 20,000. They qualify after studying for the CILEX Professional Qualification (CPQ), a vocational route into the legal profession, open to those with or without a university degree or equivalent qualification/experience.

They undertake the same work as solicitors, giving clients both personal and business law advice. Unlike solicitors they are specialists and are qualified to practise solely in their chosen area of specialism.

CILEX Lawyers operate equally alongside solicitors as authorised persons, the only difference being the specialist rather than general scope of their practising certificate and their qualification route.

Typical areas CILEX Lawyers advise on are conveyancing, family law, personal injury and employment law. CILEX Lawyers can become partners in law firms, coroners, judges or advocates in open court.

=== Licensed Conveyancer ===
Similar to CILEX lawyers, a Licensed Conveyancer is a specialist, qualified, lawyer that is regulated by the CLC (council for Licensed Conveyancers) a CLC lawyer specialises in solely residential and/or commercial property law. Just like solicitors, Licensed Conveyancers are able to help individuals and companies to transfer legal ownership of property.

Licensed Conveyancers can act in all aspects of conveyancing law. Licensed Conveyancers operate equally alongside solicitors as authorised persons, the only difference being the specialist rather than general scope of their licence and their qualification route.
