= Bar examination =

Test required to practice law in a specific jurisdiction

A bar examination is an examination administered by a governmental department or an agency of the courts jurisdiction that a lawyer must pass in order to be admitted to the bar of that jurisdiction.

== Australia ==
Administering bar exams is the responsibility of the bar association in the particular state or territory concerned. Those interested in pursuing a career at the bar must first be admitted as lawyers in the Supreme Court of their home state or territory. This generally requires the completion of legal studies which can take up to 8 years depending on the mode of study, the particular degree being completed and the law school. After completing a law degree, law graduates are then usually required to complete a period of Practical Legal Training (PLT). During the PLT period, law graduates are provided with further legal education focusing more on the practical or technical aspects of the law, such as court practice, conveyancing and drafting statements of claim. Law graduates are also required to complete a minimum number of days under the supervision of a more senior lawyer.

After the successful completion of practical legal training, law graduates must then apply to be admitted to the Supreme Court in their state or territory. This ceremony is usually held with the chief justice of the state or territory presiding. It is a formal ceremony which also includes taking an oath (or making an affirmation) to uphold the laws of the jurisdiction and results in the person's name being recorded on the Roll of Practitioners in that jurisdiction.

Once admitted, those wishing to practise as barristers must contact the relevant bar association to register and sit the bar exam. The frequency and availability of these exams depends on the relevant bar association. Generally, the bar exams focus on three main areas of practice which are relevant to barristers; namely evidence, procedure and ethics. The exams are usually administered during the course of a day and comprise a variety of question types, usually answers are given in essay form. Candidates are informed of their results within a few months and pass rates are very competitive. Passing the bar exam in and of itself does not automatically allow one to practise as a barrister, in many jurisdictions (such as New South Wales) further requirements apply.

=== New South Wales ===
In New South Wales, successful bar exam candidates are required to complete the NSW Bar Association Bar Practice Course (BPC), which despite its name, is a mandatory course required to be taken after passing the bar exam. The BPC consists of lectures, assignments and a significant amount of further reading about court procedure and case law. At the conclusion of the BPC, candidates are then required to appear in a mock trial, often before real judicial officers, and argue their respective case. Once satisfied that the candidate has completed these requirements, the NSW Bar Association then provides each candidate with their practising certificate.

Newly called barristers are referred to as readers for a period of usually one year and are required to have at least one tutor who is barrister with at least seven years of call but is not Senior Counsel.

The initial practising certificate often contains restrictions on what type of work readers are permitted to do. This may include restrictions such as appearing in court alone, undertaking direct access briefs or any other restriction which the bar association deems appropriate. After the 12-month period and upon completion of further requirements such as civil and criminal reading to the bar associations satisfaction, readers are then provided with an unrestricted practising certificate and are no longer readers but barristers.

== Brazil ==
The Order of Attorneys of Brazil (Ordem dos Advogados do Brasil), the Brazilian bar association, administers a bar examination nationwide two to three times a year (usually in January, March and September). The exam is divided in two stages – the first consists of 80 multiple choice questions covering all disciplines (Ethics, Human Rights, Philosophy of Law, Constitutional Law, Administrative Law, Civil Law, Consumer Law, Civil Procedure Law, Criminal Law, Criminal Procedure Law, Child and Adolescent Act, Labour Law, Labour Procedure Law, Tax Law, Commercial Law, International Law, Environmental Law, Pension Law, Fiscal Law, Election Law). The candidate must score at least 40 questions correctly to proceed to the second part of the exam, which are four essay questions and a drafting project (motion, opinion or claim document) in Civil Law (including Consumer Law), Labour Law, Criminal Law, Administrative Law, Constitutional Law, Corporate Law or Tax Law, and their respective procedures. The Bar examination can be taken on the graduation year. Success in the examination allows one to practice in any court or jurisdiction of the country.

== Canada ==
In Canada, admission to the bar is a matter of provincial or territorial jurisdiction. All provinces, except for Québec, follow a common law tradition. Lawyers in every common law province are qualified as both barristers and solicitors, and must pass a Barristers' Examination and Solicitors' Examination administered by the Law Society that governs the legal profession in their respective province or territory. The common law provinces all require prospective lawyers to complete a term of articles (usually 10 months) after graduation from law school during which they work under the supervision of a qualified lawyer. The bar exams may be taken after graduation from law school, but before the commencement of articling, or may be taken during or after articling is completed. Once the barristers' and solicitors' exams have been passed and the term of articles is successfully completed, students may then be called to the bar and admitted to the legal profession as lawyers (barristers and solicitors).

== China ==
Chinese students seeking to become lawyers are required to pass the National Unified Legal Professional Qualification Examination, administered by the Ministry of Justice. This exam was created and first administered in 2018 with an annual pass rate of 10% to 15%. It is an updated version of the previous Chinese bar exam, administered from 2002-2017.

== England and Wales ==
Since the UK has a separated legal profession, Law graduates in England and Wales can take examinations to qualify as a barrister or a solicitor by either undertaking the Bar Professional Training Course (BPTC) or the Solicitors Qualification Exam (previously the Legal Practice Course (LPC)) respectively. These courses are the vocational part of the training required under the rules of the Bar Standards Board and the Solicitors Regulation Authority and are either undertaken on a full-time basis for one year or on a part-time basis over two years. After successfully completing these courses, which generally include various examinations and practical ability tests, graduates must secure either a training contract (for those who have completed the LPC) or a pupillage (for those who have completed the BPTC). These are akin to articling positions in other jurisdictions and are the final practical stage before being granted full admission to practice. The general timescale therefore to become fully qualified after entering Law School can range between 6–7 years (assuming no repeats are required).

However, some controversy remains about the lack of training contracts and pupillages available to graduates even after having completed the LPC/BPTC. These courses can vary in cost anywhere from £9,000 to £17,000 and are generally undertaken by students on a private basis making them incur additional costs. The final debt in student fees alone after having completed the academic and vocational training can range between £20,000-£25,000. This is set to increase to £40,000-£50,000 for students entering law school.

The Solicitor Qualifying Examination (also known as the SQE exam or "super exam") is the common or single route to qualify as a solicitor in England and Wales. Replacing the Qualified Lawyers Transfer Scheme in September 2021, this is the only English and Welsh bar examination for solicitors.

== France ==
In France, Law graduates must obtain a vocational degree called certificat d'aptitude à la profession d'avocat (or CAPA in everyday speech) in order to practice independently. The most common way to achieve the CAPA is by training in an école d'avocats (Lawyer's School). This training includes academical and vocational courses and mandatory internships in law firms. Entrance to Lawyer's School is obtained by competitive examination.

== Germany ==
To become a lawyer in Germany, one has to study law at university for five years. Then, one has to pass the First Examination in Law (Erste Juristische Prüfung), which is administered in parts by the Oberlandesgericht (Higher State Court) of the respective state and in parts by the university the person attends; the state part accounts for 70% of the final grade, the university part for 30%. The First Examination is recognised as equivalent to an integrated Master's degree. However, it only provides a limited qualification and does not itself permit access to regulated careers in the legal field without further training.

After the First Examination in Law, candidates that wish to fully qualify must participate in a two-year practical training period (Referendariat) including placements at a court of law, a public prosecutor's office, a public sector in-house legal team and a law firm (private practice) or private sector in-house legal team. At the end of this training, candidates must take and pass the Second State Examination in Law (Zweites Staatsexamen).

Successful candidates of the Second Examination are called fully qualified lawyer (Volljurist). They may join the bar as an attorney, to become judges and to become state attorneys (public prosecutors). There are some other legal or legal-adjacent careers which require additional or different training (namely public notaries and patent lawyers).

== Ghana ==
To become a lawyer in Ghana, one has to study law at any university that offers the Bachelor of Laws degree. After completing the four year law degree, graduates can apply to be enrolled at the Ghana School of Law. Following two years of professional training, successful students can take their bar examination. Upon passing the bar examination, an induction and calling to the bar ceremony is held for all graduating students.

== Hungary ==
In Hungary, the Bar Examination is called "Jogi Szakvizsga", can be translated as "Legal Profession Examination". To sit for an exam, the candidate needs at least 3 years of daily 8 hours work experience after having a law university degree (masters level). This exam is composed of three parts:

1. Criminal Law, Criminal Procedural Law and Law of Criminal Enforcement
2. Civil Law, Civil Procedural Law and Business Law
3. Constitutional Law, Administrative Law, Labor Law, Social Security Law and Law of the European Union.

After passing these exams the candidate can practice law as a lawyer or as a court secretary, judge, a prosecutor at the public prosecutor's office, as a notary public, deputy notary, or an in-house legal counsel etc., and may operate individually at any field of Hungarian law (which also means that they may appear before any Hungarian court without a professional legal representative.)

== India ==
The examination conducted is by Bar Council of India. The candidate will be given certificate of practice and will be eligible to practice in any court in India. The exam is conducted in 53 cities of India in national and regional languages. For eligibility, members should hold a law degree from a recognised institute of law approved by the Bar Council of India, registered with their respective State Bar Councils.

== Ireland ==
The law profession in the Republic of Ireland is divided into barristers and solicitors.

For barristers, there are 5 entrance exams (constitutional law, law of torts, criminal law, contract law and law of evidence - in order to sit these exams, the candidate must have an approved law degree which consists of land law (including law of succession), company law, EU law, equity and trusts, administrative law and jurisprudence) before beginning the bar exams, which are conducted by the Honorable Society of King's Inns. King’s Inns run a series of fourteen exams over ten weeks, from March to June each year. For those enrolled as students in its one year Barrister-at-Law degree, the course covers skills such as intensive advocacy (including contested advocacy and witness handling), consultation, drafting of legal documents, legal research, opinion writing, practice and procedure. The syllabus also covers an in-depth knowledge of the legal foundation course, civil procedure, criminal procedure, ethics, professional responsibility and practice management, alternative dispute resolution, conveyancing, Irish legal terminology alongside an advanced study of one specialised area of practice as an elective. For those who fail to meet the requisite 50% pass mark, repeats are held in the following August and September. Once the candidate has passed, they are required to complete 1 year of unpaid pupillage (also known as “devilling”) with an experienced barrister in order to become a practising barrister. The candidate may then register with the Bar of Ireland in order to become a member of the Law Library.

For solicitors, there are 8 entrance exams known as the Final Examination - First Part (FE-1) and are conducted by the Law Society of Ireland twice a year. The FE-1 consists of constitutional law, law of torts, criminal law, contract law, property law, EU law, company law and equity & trusts. Once a candidate has passed the FE-1, they must secure a training contract and pass the Professional Practice Course (PPC). The PPC consists of mandatory modules such as dispute resolution (civil litigation), business law, applied land law (conveyancing, landlord & tenant law), probate, tax, professional responsibility (solicitors’ ethics and accounts), family law, legal practice Irish and skills such as advocacy, commercial drafting, legal writing, legal research, negotiation skills, presentation skills and interviewing & advising. Candidates are also required to complete four advanced electives during the course of their traineeship. The pass rate for these exams is 50% with repeats being held in Autumn. Once a candidate has passed the FE-1, the PPC and the requisite 2 years of their traineeship, the candidate may then apply to be admitted to the Roll of Solicitors and will be issued a practising certificate, as required by the Law Society of Ireland.

== Israel ==
Israel requires candidates, who had completed their law degree overseas, to hold an Israeli citizenship or permanent residency, and a law degree from an educational institution recognized by the law faculty of the Hebrew University of Jerusalem, before being eligible to take the examinations for admittance to the Israel Bar Association. The candidate must pass a battery of examinations for admittance. There is an initial series of examinations in eight separate areas of law: obligations and labor law, property law, family and succession law, criminal law and procedure, civil procedure and professional ethics, constitutional and administration law, commercial law on corporations, partnerships, and other associations, and commercial law on bankruptcy, liquidations, bills, exchange, and tax law. After passing these exams, candidates must serve as an articled clerk for one year, after which they must pass the final examinations, which deal with court procedure, procedure for registering land rights in real estate, procedure for registering corporations, partnerships, and liquidations, interpretation of laws and judicial documents, professional ethics, evidence, and recent changes in case law and legislation. The final examinations consist of a written examination followed by an oral examination in front of three judges.

== Iran ==
The Bar Exam in Iran is administered by two different and completely separate bodies. One is the Bar Association of Iran, known as the Central Bar Association in Tehran, covering every province's certifications. This body regulates all the auspices of the country's syndicate of the bars of the country. The other body is administered by the Judicial System of Iran subject to article 187 of the country's economic, social and cultural development plan.

To receive the license to practice as a "First Degree Attorney" in Iran, an applicant should complete a bachelor of law program. The official career path starts after passing the Bar Exam and receiving the title of "Trainee at Law". The exam is highly competitive and only a certain number of top applicants are admitted annually. There have been concerns about the impartiality of the Center of Attorneys in Iran when granting certifications. Lawyers can only specialize in one area, and requirements typically include a minimum of three years' experience working and other accomplishments like a PhD, publications, teaching experience, or judicial experience.

After admission to the bar, an 18-month apprenticeship begins which is highly regulated under the auspices of Bar Syndicate Rules and supervision of an assigned First Degree Attorney. Trainees or apprentices must attend designated courts for designated weeks to hear cases and write case summaries. A logbook signed by the judge on the bench has to certify their weekly attendance. By the end of the eighteenth month, they are eligible to apply to take the Final Bar Exam by submitting their case summaries, the logbook and a research work pre-approved by the Bar. It is noteworthy, however, that during these 18 months, Trainees are eligible to have a limited practice of law under the supervision of their supervising Attorney. This practice does not include Supreme Court eligible cases and certain criminal and civil cases. Candidates will be tested on Civil law, Civil Procedure, Criminal law, Criminal Procedure, Commercial Law, Notary (including rules pertaining Official Documents, Land & Real Estate registrations and regulations etc.). Each exam takes two days, a day on oral examination in front of a judge or an attorney, and a day of essay examination, in which they will be tested on hypothetical cases submitted to them. Successful applicants will be honoured with the title of "First Degree Attorney", after they take the oath and can practice in all courts of the country including the Supreme Court. Those who fail must redo the program in full or in part before re-taking the Final Bar Exam.

== Italy ==
In Italy, the Bar Examination is called "abilitazione all'esercizio della professione forense". To sit for an exam, the candidate needs a 5-year university degree in jurisprudence and 18 months of legal apprenticeship at a law firm with at least 20 court hearings per semester. The State Bar Exam is composed of two parts: a written exam and an oral exam. The written exam is composed of three written tests over three seven-hour days. The candidate writes two legal briefs, respectively on contracts and torts (and more generally about civil law), and criminal law, and a third court brief on civil, crime, or administrative law. The candidates who pass the written tests (the pass rates vary from 30% to 50% according to jurisdiction) can sit at an oral exam before a panel of judges, lawyers, and law professors, who interview for about an hour the candidates on six areas of law. Italian lawyers may represent their clients on any Italian criminal, civil, or administrative court, except the Supreme Court of Cassation for which an additional exam after several years of law practice is required.

== Japan ==
The bar exams in Japan yield the fewest successful candidates worldwide. The old format of the examinations, last held in 2010 saw only 6% passing the exam. With the new format of examinations—even after extensive reforms and a new mandatory duration of graduate school education for a period of two years—the pass rate is only 22%. Since 2014, candidates are allowed to take the examinations within five years before their right to take the exam is revoked and they either have to return to law school, take the preparatory exam or give up totally. It is administered solely by the Ministry of Justice.

== Malaysia ==
In Malaysia, students are required to pass the Certificate in Legal Practice (CLP), a 9-month post-graduate course and subsequent examination required to become a qualified lawyer.

However, graduates who hold a Bachelor's of Laws (LLB) degree or other legal qualifications which are recognised by the Legal Profession Qualifying Board of Malaysia are exempted from sitting for the Certificate in Legal Practice (CLP).

== Philippines ==
The Philippine Bar Examination is a national test administered once every year on the four Sundays of September (September before 2011 and November until 2022). It covers eight areas of law: political law, labor law and social legislation, criminal law, civil law, commercial law, taxation law, remedial law, and legal ethics and practical exercises. There are selected testing sites around the country’s law schools. The top achievers by percentage are released every year in the list of top ten to twenty bar passers.

== Poland ==
In Poland, the bar examination is taken after graduating from a law faculty at a university. It allows a person to undertake practice, the duration of which varies depending on the specialization. After the practical period applicants must pass the exam held by the Professional Chambers with assistance from some members of the Ministry of Justice.

== Singapore ==
The Singapore Bar Examination (Part B) is administered once every year, usually over the course of four days. The exam is generally held on the last week of November, and is administered by the Singapore Institute of Legal Education (SILE). The eight practice areas covered in the examination include, Civil Law Practice, Criminal Law Practice, Ethics and Professional Responsibility, Family Law Practice, Real Estate Practice, Insolvency Practice, and two electives to be chosen from a list of elective subjects offered, such as, Mediation, Arbitration, and Intellectual Property. From 2023 the exam will become more stringent and training will be lengthened.

In Singapore, the legal profession is a fused profession, granting the professional qualification of an 'Advocate and Solicitor' to any successful candidate of the Bar Examinations and its practical requirements. To qualify as a candidate for the Bar Examinations, an aspiring candidate must first be a graduate from a law school or university that is on the approved list of schools mandated by the Ministry of Law. The candidate must have also attained a Second Class Lower or equivalent classification in their law degrees to qualify for the bar exam.

The three universities based in Singapore offering a Bachelor of Laws degree are, National University of Singapore, Singapore Management University, and Singapore University of Social Sciences. There are presently twenty-seven (27) foreign universities offering an approved Bachelor of Laws degree on the list, hailing from four countries, United Kingdom, Australia, New Zealand, and the United States of America.

To be called to the Singaporean Bar, all law graduates must complete the following:

1. Sit for, and pass the Singapore Bar Examinations (Part B).
2. Completed a six-month training contract known as the Practice Training Contract with a local law firm, or practice.
3. Subject to an order from Court, legal trainees who have completed at least three months of their Practice Training Contract, as well as sat for and passed the Singapore Bar Examinations (Part B), are able to seek partial admission to the bar. By applying to the Court to be part-called, candidates are granted the right to appear before the Court in specific circumstances.

In addition, all law graduates of non-Singaporean university must complete the following additional requirements:

1. Sit for, and pass the Singapore Bar Examinations (Part A). The five subjects which are offered in this exam are, Administrative and Constitutional Law, Company Law, Criminal Law, Evidence, and Land Law. All foreign university graduates are required to pass this exam to prove competence in Singaporean law. Part A of the Bar Examinations are administered by SILE as well.
2. All foreign university graduates are also required to complete an additional six-month training known as the Relevant Legal Training, to prove practical competence with a local law firm, or practice.
3. Both the Relevant Legal Training, and the Singapore Bar Examinations (Part A) must be completed by a candidate before said candidate is allowed to commence either their Practice Training Contract, or sit for the Singapore Bar Examinations (Part B).

SILE publishes a Commendation List at the end of February of each year to recognise the top performing candidates with two or more subject distinctions in the annual Singapore Bar Examinations (Part B). The Commendation List is also published annually in the March issue of Singapore Law Gazette. Some notable alumni of the Commendation List include Goh Yihan.

== South Africa ==
Lawyers in South Africa are separated as in several other Commonwealth countries, but there is a different naming convention. Attorneys face clients while advocates face the courts. Attorneys may appear in some lower courts.

To be admitted as an attorney, one serves "articles" as a candidate attorney with a practising attorney for two years, and then writes a "board exam" set by the relevant provincial Law Society. The length of articles may be reduced by attending a practical legal training course or performing community service. Attorneys may additionally qualify as Notaries and Conveyancers, via the Conveyancing and Notarial Practice Examinations; those with technical or scientific training may further qualify as patent attorneys.

The requirements to enter private practice as an advocate (Junior Counsel) are also twofold: one needs to become a member of a Bar Association by undergoing a period of training (pupilage) for one year with a practicing advocate and one also needs to sit an admission examination. On the recommendation of the Bar Councils, an advocate "of proven experience and skill" (at least ten years experience), may be appointed by the President of South Africa as a Senior Counsel (SC; also referred to as a "silk").

The law regulating admission to practise law ("The Qualifications of Legal Practitioners Amendment Act of 1997") is being revised.

== South Korea ==
Due to the colonial-era influence, South Korea's bar exam system closely follows that of Japan's. First introduced in 1963, South Korea is phasing out in 2017 its old system that allows anyone to take the exam and undergo mandatory 2-year state-sponsored training that is criticized for generating "고시낭인" or "exam jobless" referring to people who spend many years of their lives preparing for the exam. The new law school system that began in 2009 allows only the graduates of a law school to apply for the bar exam.

== Spain ==
In Spain the examination to be admitted into the legal practice is the All Spain Bar Examination (after which the lawyer's license is obtained). The examination is called and conducted by the Ministry of Justice and is the same for all Spain, regardless of which bar association you later join. It is called annually (once a year) and takes place at the same time throughout all Spain.

The evaluation test has a total duration of 4 hours and consists of:

- 50 questions on «Common subjects in the practice of the legal profession».
- 25 questions on «Specific subjects» according to the legal specialty (civil and commercial, criminal, administrative and contentious-administrative, and labor)

== Thailand ==
In Thailand, the bar examination is separate from the lawyer licence. To practice law as a lawyer—i.e. to speak in the court—one must pass a lawyer licence examination and does not need to be called to the bar. People take the bar examination to become qualified to take a judge or public prosecutor examination.

To be called to the bar, one must pass the written exams consisting of four parts as follows.

1. Civil and commercial law, intellectual property law, and international trade law.
2. Criminal law, employment law, constitution law, administrative law, and tax law.
3. Civil procedure law, bankruptcy and business reorganization law, and the system of the court of justice. And
4. Criminal procedure law, human rights, and law on the evidence.

Each part has 10 essay questions. The pass mark is 50. The parts 1-2 are usually taken in October and the rest are usually taken in March. One does not need to pass all four parts in one year. After passing all the written exams, there is an oral exam.

Around 10,000 bar students sit the exam each year. In 2013, 1,231 students were called to the bar, 111 of whom did it in only one year.

Quite confusingly with international norms, students called to the bar are referred to as netibandit (เนติบัณฑิต), which means Barrister-at-Law in English. The Thai legal profession, however, is a fused one and those with lawyer licenses are able to practice both as barristers and solicitors in the British/Commonwealth sense. Many students called to the bar choose to become judges or public prosecutors instead of lawyers. As the Thai bar examination (administered and awarded by the Thai Bar Association) is separate from the lawyers licensing scheme (administered and awarded by the Lawyers Council of Thailand), this means that judges and public prosecutors belong to a separate licensing organization from lawyers. This is unlike in the US where judges and prosecutors most often come from the ranks of senior lawyers and belong to the same bar.

== United States ==
In the United States, bar examinations are administered by agencies of individual states and territories. In almost all U.S. states and territories, the bar examination is one of several requirements for admission to the bar. In most jurisdictions, the examination is two days long and consists of multiple-choice questions, essay questions, and "performance tests" that model certain kinds of legal writing. The National Conference of Bar Examiners (NCBE) creates several component examinations that are used in varying combinations by all but two jurisdictions, sometimes in combination with locally drafted examination components. The main exceptions are Louisiana and Puerto Rico, which follow civil law systems unlike other parts of the United States.

Generally, earning a degree from a law school (or, more rarely, apprenticeship in a law office) is a prerequisite for taking the bar exam. Most law school graduates engage in a regimen of study (called "bar review") between graduating from law school and sitting for the bar.

== See also ==
- Bar association
- Bar review
- IRAC
