= Nottingham Law School =

Law school in Nottingham, England

- Parent school: Nottingham Trent University
- Established: 1964
- School type: Public
- Location: Nottingham, England, United Kingdom
- Enrollment: 2,664
- Faculty: 100
- Website: www.ntu.ac.uk/nls

Nottingham Law School (also known as NLS) is a law school in the UK with over 100 full-time lecturers and over 2,500 students. It is an academic and professional institution, part of Nottingham Trent University.

The institution specialises in different fields of education in law. Nottingham Law school's main goal is to provide their students careers that they are guaranteed after the completion of their graduation.

The faculty of Nottingham Law School was known for developing and creating the Legal Practice Course that includes the training and schooling of law designed courses that deal with the actuality of the legal system, demonstrating the different skills required for indulging with law in the year of 1990s. With the development of the new designed course, the professors and teachers of the Nottingham Law School decided to take the initiative of enrolling more students into the program. The law school also took the stance on initiating part-time students into the course, as well as raising the number of seats in the course for students enrolled in full-time study.

Nottingham Law School participated in running the Law Society Final Examination with a number of 150 students enrolled in the course. It is not to be confused with the School of Law at University of Nottingham.

Nottingham Law School has been given the top 'Excellent' rating by the Law Society and comparable ratings by the Bar Standards Board of England and Wales every year since its inception. It also has a significant reputation for research, particularly in insolvency and international criminal justice, with 60% being judged as of international standard in the most recent 2008 Research Assessment Exercise.

Since 1977, Nottingham Law School has also produced its own annual law journal; the Nottingham Law Journal.

== Courses ==
Nottingham Law School provides a range of undergraduate LLB and postgraduate LLM degrees. The School also provides professional legal education including the Graduate Diploma in Law conversion course, the Legal Practice Course, for intending solicitors, and the Bar Professional Training Course for intending barristers.

=== Professional ===
==== Bar Professional Training Course ====
The Nottingham Law School has been accredited for being one of the nine universities that provides courses in the assistance of the Bar exam, that has been known as the Bar Professional Training Course. Nottingham Law School has a capacity of 120 students for the Bar Professional Training Course approved by the Bar Standards Board.

==== Legal Practice Course ====
The Legal Practice Course offers three different routes: the standard, the commercial and the corporate. It further provides 7 specialties, from which students can register and choose the top 2 of which field they desire. These specialties are the following: "corporate finance, commercial law, advanced litigation, employment, commercial leases, family, and client in the community." The Nottingham Law School provides different groups of meetings to help the student with certain skills, and support in assisting the students practice the different skills, and activities. The Legal Practice Course supports their students in providing them accurate real life problems related to the field law, in which the students have to indulge in solving matters, through demonstrating their vast skills learned from the credible teachers and staff of the faculty of law. The duration of the course meetings varies according to the choice of the students enrolled in full-time study. Students of Nottingham Law School registered in the Legal Practice Course have to commit to 13 days of concentrated studying, regardless of whether it is at home or at the workplace.

== NLS Legal ==
The law school also hosts NLS Legal at Nottingham Law School. Founded in 2006 as the Legal Advice Clinic, the firm experienced growth threefold by the year 2012 and reopened as the Legal Advice Centre in 2014 with a purpose-built suite in the University's Chaucer building. The firm has since been rebranded to NLS Legal to reflect the expanding services on offer to the local community. The firm provides free legal advice on a number of areas, including employment, family, housing, tribunal and court representation, education (including special education needs and disabilities), welfare benefits, business, civil litigation, intellectual property and crime. Advice is generally given by Nottingham Law School students on a pro bono basis, with the firm aiming to "give law students a flying start to their legal career".

== Notable staff ==
- Nigel Savage, Dean of Nottingham Law School from 1989 to 1996

== Notable alumni ==
- Nene Amegatcher – Justice of the Supreme Court of Ghana (2018–2023)
- Nick Freeman – British solicitor.
- Chuka Umunna – MP for Streatham between 2010 and 2019
- Paul Carr – British writer, journalist and commentator based in San Francisco
- Rizwan Hussain – Barrister and UK television presenter.
- Alyn Smith – SNP MEP for Scotland 2004–2019, MP 2019–present
- Nwabueze Nwokolo – Royal princess of Ngwaland and Nigerian United Kingdom based lawyer who is council member at Law Society of England and Wales.
- Joyce Mbui – Kenyan lawyer
