= Bar Finals =

Bar Finals may refer to:

- Bar examination § England and Wales
- Bar Vocational Course
- Barrister § Qualifying as a barrister
