= Trainee solicitor =

Prospective lawyer undergoing professional training at a law firm

Trainee Solicitor
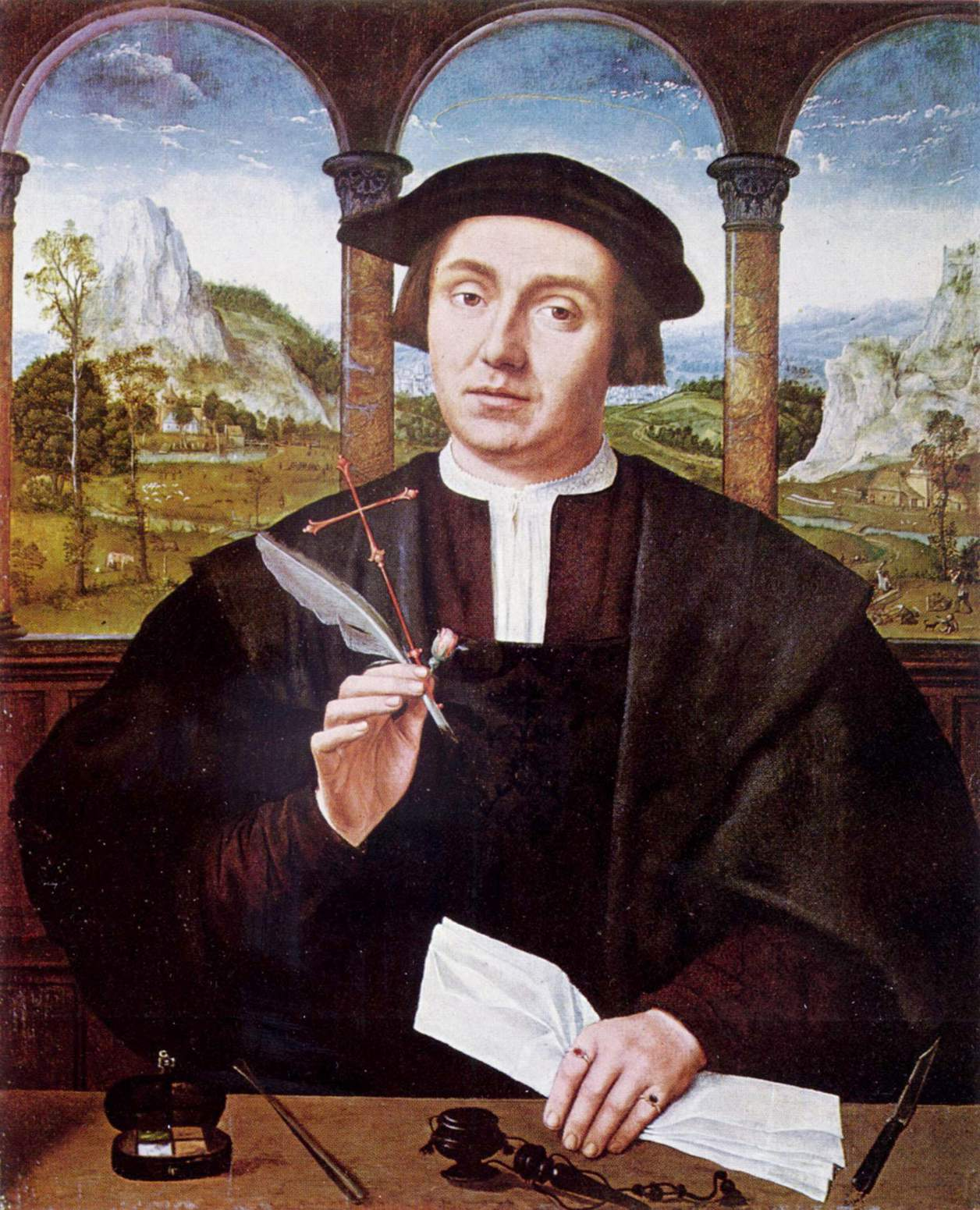
- 16th-century painting of a civil law notary, by Flemish painter Quentin Massys

Occupation
- Occupation type: Profession
- Activity sectors: Law

Description
- Competencies: Interpersonal skills, literacy, advocacy, analytical mind, critical thinking, commercial sense
- Education required: Law degree / Non-law degree + GDL, Solicitors Qualifying Examination (and possibly Common Professional Examination)
- Fields of employment: Law firm, government, in-house
- Related jobs: Solicitor, pupil barrister, barrister, judge

In the United Kingdom, Australia, Hong Kong, Ireland, and certain other English common law jurisdictions, a trainee solicitor is a prospective lawyer undergoing professional training at a law firm or an in-house legal team to qualify as a full-fledged solicitor. This period of training is known as a training contract and usually lasts for two years.

The barrister's equivalent would be twelve months' pupillage under a pupilmaster, in barristers' chambers, or for advocates in Scotland, eight or nine months devilling under a devilmaster.

== Route ==
=== England and Wales ===
Before they are eligible to train, the trainee must first have an undergraduate degree in law, or another degree and later taken a conversion course (i.e. the Common Professional Examination or Graduate Diploma in Law), and then completed the Solicitors Qualifying Examination (SQE). The SQE and the training contract may be taken at the same time part-time.

During the training contract, trainees are required to gain practical experience in at least three distinctive areas of law. On successful completion of the training contract, the trainee will qualify and be admitted as a solicitor.

Trainee solicitors and training contracts were formerly known as articled clerks and articles of clerkship, respectively.

For trainee solicitors, the Law Society recommend a minimum salary of £22,794 in London and £20,217 outside of London. However, this is not binding owing to the removal of a regulatory minimum salary by the SRA in 2014. Firms are now required to pay no more than the national minimum wage.

=== Ireland ===
In the Republic of Ireland, the Law Society of Ireland is authorised under the Solicitors Act 1954 to regulate training and accreditation of solicitors. Formally a trainee is termed an apprentice and entered on the society's Register of Apprentices after signing a training contract, called an Indentures of Apprenticeship Deed, with a registered solicitor. The society's qualification examinations are a Preliminary Examination, from which holders of approved law degrees are exempt, and a Final Examination (FE-1) in two parts, typically taken over two years. The FE-1 consists of eight exams and the PPC is a one year course conducted by the Law Society of Ireland. The Solicitors' Apprentice Debating Society of Ireland (SADSI) participates in student debate competitions including the Irish Times Debate.

=== Scotland ===
In Scotland the system is similar to that in England and Wales. In order to become a trainee solicitor, the student must complete an undergraduate degree in law, or complete the Law Society of Scotland examinations, before undertaking a one-year Diploma in Legal Practice. This qualifies the graduate to receive an Entrance Certificate and begin a traineeship.

Traineeships are obtained through the open job market and there is no guarantee that a graduate will secure one. Between 2008 and 2013, years, 24% of Diploma graduates have not started traineeships.

Trainees must complete at least 60 hours of Trainee Continuing Professional Development. After three months, the trainee can apply for admission as a solicitor, allowing them to appear in court.

On successful completion of the traineeship, the traineeship is discharged and the trainee will be eligible for a Practising Certificate.

=== Work placements ===
Work placements allow students a brief (normally two-week) experience within the working environment of a firm of solicitors. Interested students may find local opportunities through their school's or university's career adviser, or apply direct to the firms of solicitors.

Assessed work placements in law firms, which often include a formal interview for a traineeship towards the end of the placement, are also known as vacation schemes.

=== Hong Kong ===
In Hong Kong, the route is generally identical to that in England and Wales, save with the substitution of the Postgraduate Certificate in Laws course for the LPC.

=== Canada ===
Each of the provincial and territorial jurisdictions offer similar routes to other Commonwealth jurisdictions, typically by way of articles or stage. The province of Ontario, for example offers experiential training, by way of articles of clerkship or the Law Practice Program.
