= Central Applications Board =

The Central Applications Board provides a single point of application for those wishing to undertake the Common Professional Examination/Graduate Diploma in Law, Legal Practice Course and courses preparing candidates for the Solicitors Qualifying Examination (SQE) in England and Wales. Applicants are allowed to select up to three institutions (and up to three campuses within each institution) based on order of preference. Once an application has been received it is then sent to the prospective institutions who judge each student by their own criteria and respond individually (rather than through the Board).

Applications for Barrister and Legal Executive education/training are handled separately as they are the responsibility of the Bar Council and Chartered Institute of Legal Executives.
