= Training contract =

A training contract is a compulsory period of practical training in a law firm for law graduates before they can qualify as a solicitor in the United Kingdom (UK), Ireland, Australia or Hong Kong, or as an advocate and solicitor in Singapore. During the training period, the participant is known as a trainee solicitor or trainee lawyer (in Singapore). Since 2021 this has been replaced by Qualifying Work Experience in the UK.

A training contract can apply to any profession. In some 21st-century contracts, a small number of contracts are secured by an Agency who represent many training professionals. Otherwise training contracts can be negotiated locally.

== United Kingdom ==
In the UK a full-time training contract is normally for two years.

While trainees in England and Wales will normally have first completed the Legal Practice Course, some are also completing the LPC as part-time students alongside their practical training. In Scotland, future solicitors will instead study the Diploma in Professional Legal Practice before commencing their traineeship.

Trainee solicitors and training contracts were formerly known as articled clerks and articles of clerkship, respectively. In the UK, the barrister's equivalent is a twelve-month pupillage under a pupilmaster, in barristers' chambers.

=== Route ===
To obtain a training contract (since 1 September a training contract is now formally known as 'Qualifying Work Experience' (QWE)), a graduate must apply for an opening for such position at a law firm or in-house legal team. Law firms often recruit a year or two in advance of the start of planned employment, allowing non-law graduates to complete the academic prerequisites of the Graduate Diploma in Law and the Legal Practice Course before starting their training contract. Some in-house legal teams prefer recruiting trainees ad-hoc or promoting existing legal assistants and paralegals that have proven themselves.

Many law firms offer vacation schemes (one- or two-week internships) as a way of assessing candidates for training contracts. The vacation schemes usually involve real work in one of the firm's departments, various assessment exercises and an interview. Vacation scheme attendees are normally paid.

A concern of the profession is that each year the number of applicants exceeds the number of contracts available. Graduates unable to obtain a training contract will have accrued sizeable debts with no guarantee of being able to qualify as a lawyer other than by way of the poorly documented, and relatively recent Equivalent Means route. In years past, it was common for aspiring lawyers to pay law firms to train them (a practice also common in other professions in the past, including officer positions in the Royal Navy as well as pilot training in civil aviation). The introduction of the SQE (Solicitors Qualifying Examination) by the Solicitors Regulation Authority has led many UK law firms to reconsider how they will run both their training contract programmes and early careers entry routes in general.

=== Structure ===
A training contract at larger commercial firms is usually divided into "seats" of four or six months each - rotations or placements within different departments of a law firm, ensuring that the trainee can build up experience in both contentious and advisory/transactional legal work. Some in-house legal teams and smaller firms employ a non-rotational training contract instead.

It may also involve a client secondment, where the trainee is placed with a client's in-house legal team, or an international secondment to an office of the law firm situated abroad.

=== Legal executives ===
For a legal executive, who normally does not hold a law degree, a training contract is not normally required to qualify as a solicitor. They typically advance toward qualification by passing exams administered by the Chartered Institute of Legal Executives (CILEx), while working under the supervision of a solicitor.

== Singapore ==
In Singapore, a Practice Training Contract spans 6 months, and is normally undertaken after the applicant, who must be a "qualified person" under local legislation relating to the legal profession, has attended a 5-month practical law course, called the Preparatory Course leading to Part B of the Singapore Bar Examinations (or Part B Course), and has passed Part B of the Singapore Bar Examinations (or Part B), although the reverse order is permissible.

A Practice Training Contract is a formal arrangement between a qualified person and a law practice for supervised training in relation to practicing law in Singapore. A qualified lawyer of at least 5 to 7 years' standing, known as a supervising solicitor, is responsible for the supervision of the practice trainee for the duration of the contract.

Upon the satisfactory completion of both the Practice Training Contract and Part B, the qualified person is, subject to certain other requirements, eligible to be admitted to practice law as an Advocate and Solicitor of the Supreme Court of Singapore (i.e. "called to the Singapore Bar").

== See also ==
- Pupillage, training for barrister qualification
- Articling, the Canadian system
