= Labour law in Bulgaria =

Labour law regulates the legal relationship in Bulgaria between individual workers and employees (individual labour law) as well as between coalitions and representative bodies.

== Sources of labour law ==
Bulgarian labour law is characterized by a multi-stage normative regulation. In addition to the Labour Code (Bulg: Кодекс на труда) from 1986 numerous detailed primary and secondary rules and regulations are applicable (Regulation for minors below the age of 15 (1986) Bulg: Наредба за работата на лицата, ненашършили 15-годишна възраст; Regulation No. 4 of 1993 on the necessary documents which must accompany an employment contract Наредба №4 за документите, които са необходими за сключване на трудов договор; Regulation No. 5 on the procedure for the registration of employment under Article 62, para.4 of the Labour Code Наредба №5 за съдържанието и реда за изпращане на уведомление по чл. 62, ал. 4 от Кодекса на труда etc.)

== Employment relationship ==
The employment relationship is a legal relationship between an employer and an employee which regulates the rights and obligations of the parties respectively. On the one hand, the employee must perform work and comply with the established disciplinary rules in the company and the employer must, on the other hand, provide the working conditions and pay an appropriate remuneration to the employees. An employment relationship can arise only on the grounds listed in the Labour Code: employment contract, application procedure, election or administrative act.

== Parties to the employment relationship ==
Those employees qualified as blue-collar workers perform physical labour, whereas the so-called white-collar workers perform intellectual work. A person must have reached a minimum age to be eligible to conclude a labour contract. Generally, the minimum required age in Bulgaria pursuant to Article 301(1) of the Labour Code is 16 years. However, due to the risk of injuries inherent in some types of work this minimum could be increased. The Bulgarian legislation provides that in certain cases the minimum age may be lower as well (for example work in the circus or arts). An identity card or birth certificate serves as proof for the age of the employee. The employer may be natural or legal person. He has the so-called advisory and disciplinary power and has the right to give instructions to the employee. His duties are principally to ensure suitable working conditions and to pay remuneration.

== Employment contract ==
The employment contract is a written agreement between an employee who provides a service and another person, being an employer who provides the working conditions and compensation for the fulfillment of the employee's obligations. The legal requirements regarding the content of the employment contract are listed in Art. 66 of the Labour Code. The contract must contain:

1. Personal details of the parties;
2. Place of work;
3. Type of employment and description of the work activity;
4. Duration of the contract;
5. Duration of paid annual leave;
6. Notice period for both parties;
7. Completion date of the contract and the date of actual commencement of employment of the employee;
8. Regular daily or weekly working hours of the employee;
9. Basic wage.

The contract must include also a description of the type of work to be performed, which is drawn up together with the employment contract. Under Art. 67(2) of the Labour Code the employment contract is usually concluded for an unlimited period. There is also a possibility for a fixed-term contracts as well. An explicit agreement between the parties is necessary in any case. The Bulgarian Labour Code provides for different types of employment agreements, including probationary period agreement (Articles 70, 71 of the Labour Code), internship agreement, bargaining agreement and training contract, employment agreement for additional work with the same employer or with another employer (Article 230-233 of the Labour Code). In order for the employment contract to be valid, it must be concluded in a written form.

== Remuneration ==
The payment of remuneration is one of the main obligations of the employer and part of the obligatory content of the employment contract. The right of the employee to be paid for his wor is proclaimed in the Bulgarian Constitution of 1991. When calculating the salary of the employee, the duration of working time, intensity and quality of the work at hand must be considered. The remuneration may be calculated by two methods:

- Remuneration based on the time spent in performing the employment obligations,
- Performance-related remuneration—depending on the results of the work performed.

For the low-skilled employment, a minimum wage is set by the Council of Ministers. The Labour Code determines various types of additional payments (pay for overtime, for work during official holidays, for night work, etc.)

== Working hours ==
Bulgarian legislation provides for the possibility for different duration of working time—normal working hours, longer working hours, shorter working hours and part-time work. The normal working hours is determined in Art. 136 of the Labour Code: the standard working day is eight hours long and the work week—40 hours. This is also the maximum period allowed under the applicable law. In accordance with Art. 136a of the Labour Code extended working hours shifts can be established in the company given that the production process requires it and provided that the legal limitations are met. The peculiarity here is that the implementation of this prolonged working shift is done by a written instruction with a legally prescribed content. The shorter working hours in accordance with Articles 137, 305, 309, 317 of the Labour Code have a duration that is shorter than the normal working hours shift. These exist due to special or hazardous working conditions on the working site or due to the age or other characteristics of the employee.

The part-time work shall be performed only for part of the duration of the statutory working hours (Article 138 of the Labour Code).

On the other hand, the working time can be defined also as regular working time or overtime. Normal working time coincides with the stipulated working hours in the agreement between the parties—being it either normal 8-hour working day, or reduced working time according to Art. 137 of the Labour Code. Overtime is present when the hours worked exceed those agreed in the contract. The overtime shall be reimbursed in accordance with Art. 262 of the Labour Code with an increase in the remuneration due. In Bulgaria, work during the night can also be performed. Night work covers the period from 22:00 until 6:00, for minor employees—from 20:00 to 6:00. Article 261 of the Labour Code regulates the reward for performance of night work.

The working time can also be divided in actual working time (working hours, during which the worker should immediately fulfill its obligations) and being on disposal (working hours will be paid in reduced amount. Should the employee be called to perform actual work, this time is paid as overtime).

== Remuneration in case of overtime ==
Overtime is regulated by Art. 143-150 of the Labour Code. This work shall be performed when instructed by the employer or with his knowledge and without his objection (Art. 143(1) Labour Code). Unless otherwise agreed, in Bulgaria an employee is not obliged to perform overtime. The overtime shall be understood as work in addition to the normal working hours (e.g. before the start or end of the workday and during lunch breaks). A regulation issued by the employer is necessary for overtime work to be conducted legally. Nevertheless, this may not be needed if the employer is aware about the fact that the employee works overtime and does not object to this fact. Important: in Bulgaria if the worker performs work outside the official working hours without the knowledge or the explicit instruction of the employer, this overtime is not regarded as overtime and no additional remuneration is due. According to the Bulgarian law overtime is permitted only in the cases provided for by the Labour code (Article 144 of the LC), namely: 1. Work performed in relation to the public security (e.g. work related to the protection of the State, crisis prevention and overcoming of its consequences or in response to urgency that serves the interests of society and the common good); 2. Work relating to emergency repair works or in ensuring safety at work; when a job needs to be completed, which cannot be carried out during working hours and thus a danger arises; when executing necessary seasonal work).

In accordance with Article 146 paragraph 1 of the LC the duration of overtime in a calendar year must not exceed 150 hours within a working week—6 hours' daily work and 4 hours' night work; within a month—30 hours' daily work and 20 hours' night work as overtime. The compensation of overtime with additional holiday is forbidden. The overtime shall be paid at correspondingly higher rates that have been agreed between the parties to the employment contract (Art. 150 in conjunction with Art. 262 of the LC). Nonetheless the minimum additional payment must be as follows:

- 50% for work on weekdays;
- 75% for work on holidays;
- 100% for work on public holidays;
- 50% for work in case of summed calculation of working time.

== Rest ==
During the rest period the employee is not required to perform with his work. This is a consequence of the characteristics of the rest as a time for rest, which is to serve the restoration of the work force.

1. The lunch time is a break during the workday (Art. 151 of the LC RF). It shall not be shorter than 30 minutes.
2. The rest period after the end of the working day (Art. 152 of the LC RF) shall not be less than 12 hours.
3. Weekly rest periods (Art. 153 of the LC RF) constitute 2 consecutive days (48 hours) in a 5-day working week. When calculated, the rest shall amount to at least 36 hours between the weekly working period. If the accumulated calculation of working time refers to shift work, the rest must not be shorter than 24 hours.
4. Holidays (Art. 154 of the LC)

The wage during the holidays, however, must not be less than twice the usual remuneration for the particular work on these days (Art. 264 of the LC RF). Overtime on holidays shall be paid with an increased by 100% (Art. 262 para. 1 of the LC RF).

== Leave ==
This is a period in which the employee may be absent from work with the consent of his employer. The leave is a legally recognized individual right of the worker. The leave is measured in working days and working hours. The Bulgarian Labour Code regulates different types of leave. First, the leave can be paid—it is an individual right of the employee and is also regarded as part of the length of service/work experience. Secondly, the leave may be unpaid—for the usage of which the express consent of the employer is required. Peculiarity is that the unpaid leave is added to the work experience only when expressly provided for by law. Art. 160, para. 3 of the LC recognizes as work experience a period of up to 30 days a year. A further add-back takes place only in the cases provided by law. No specific work experience is required in order to claim these types of leave. Depending on the social purpose of the leaves, they vary as follows:

- Regular paid annual leave, which is regulated in Art 155-156a Labour Code—a prerequisite for its use is a work experience of at least 8 months. The statutory minimum entitlement to a paid leave is 20 working days. The types of this holiday are: standard holiday (every worker has the right to it and it may not be shorter than 20 working days); extended annual leave (on a claim, for certain categories of workers and officials; its duration can be up to 30–48 days); additional leave under Article 156 LC—only in specific cases.
- Purposeful holiday – provided in Art 157 of the LC; no specific working experience requirement. These include: leave for creative purposes—Art 161 of the LC; leave on social grounds—temporary incapacity, maternity, raising a child up to 2 years or up to 8 years, breast-feeding; an educational leave; holidays for the preparation of the application or admission to an educational institution, etc.

== Disciplinary proceedings ==
Disciplinary measures may be imposed by the employer or another authorized by him or by law authority (Art.192 of the LC). Prior to initiating disciplinary proceedings the employer is obliged to determine the facts and gather and assess the evidence for the alleged infringement (Art. 193 of the LC). The employer is obliged to conduct consultations with the employee and give him the opportunity to comment on the accusations as well. The employer has the discretion to decide what disciplinary sanction, if any, would be appropriate in the particular case, considering certain criteria (gravity of the infringement and the circumstances which the offense was committed under; the conduct of the employee before the infringement). The criteria shall be applied cumulatively. The employee may meanwhile petition the District Court within the period prescribed by Art. 358 of the LC. In deciding the case before it, the Court will then consider the same criteria and whether they have been applied objectively. The employee cannot be sanctioned more than once for the same infringement.

== Disciplinary measures ==
The sanctions are imposed on the workers, when he has infringed the company rules or labor discipline. The grounds for the imposition of such measures are enumerated in Art.186, 187 and 190 of the LC. Art. 188 provides for the different types of disciplinary sanctions (notice, warning and dismissal, the last being the gravest measure to be imposed only under exceptional circumstances and possibly without a prior notice period). The sanctions shall be imposed in writing—through a disciplinary order. The Bulgarian Labour Code contains stringent requirements for the content of the disciplinary order by the employer. It shall contain the reasons for the imposition of disciplinary measures and be signed by the employer. In addition, an explicit reference to the statutory provision which forms the basis for the measure shall be made. The order shall be handed personally to the employee. Provided that this proves impossible, it can be delivered by a certified post with acknowledgment of receipt. Upon signing the receipt of the letter, the order takes effect. The same applies for the deadline for lodging an appeal in accordance with Art.358 of the LC.

The imposition of a disciplinary measure is limited by statutory deadlines. These are stated in Art.194 of the LC. The sanctions shall be imposed no later than two months after the discovery of the infringement and no later than one year after its commission. A special feature of the disciplinary action is the so-called elimination. An elimination of the disciplinary measure has more significance morally than legally. There are two grounds for an expiration of a disciplinary action—either a limitation period of one year from the receipt of the order for its imposition, or by the employer in case of notice. In the second case, a written reasoned notice of the elimination of the disciplinary action is required.

== Liability of the parties to the employment contract ==
The liability of the parties can be divided into 2 types—disciplinary liability that may have been carried out by the employee, and material liability. The grounds for the imposition of disciplinary liability are enumerated in Art.187 of the Labour Code and these are violations of professional labour conduct or non-fulfillment of obligations arising from the employment relationship for the employees, such as: delay, absence from work, appearance at work in a disabled condition, non-compliance with the rules of the lawful instructions of the employer. The grounds for disciplinary dismissal are regulated in Art 190 and they envisage serious violations of the labor discipline.

The material liability of the employee is governed by the provisions of Art. 203-212 of the Labour Code. The employee shall be liable with its assets, if he has culpably caused material damage to the employer while fulfilling his work obligations. These are the principles of economic and production risk. Material liability is divided into two forms—full liability and limited liability. Full liability is incurred when the damage has been deliberately caused by a certain action or omission by the employee. This liability time, its engagement and imposition are regulated under the ordinary civil law.

The applicable legal provisions regarding the limited liability can be found in Art. 203, para. 1 and 3, Art. 204-209 and Art. 210 of the Labour Code. The size of the liability is differentiated for different categories of employees: for persons on executive and managing positions—three times the monthly remuneration; for the rest of the employees—no more than the amount of the monthly remuneration. In cases of limited liability, the employer issues an order in which he determines the basis and amount of the liability of the employee (Art. 210 of the LC). The order shall be issued within one month after discovery of the damage (but not later than one year after the induction). For executive and managing positions the periods are 3 months and 5 years accordingly. According to Art. 200 (1) of the LC the employer is liable with his assets for the damages that have led to a temporary or permanent incapacity or death of the employee. The employer is liable if an accident at work has been caused by force majeure or in fulfillment of the work commitments or during rest periods, provided the employee has not contributed himself to the accident or has caused it intentionally. The cases in which the employer is liable for damages are regulated in Art. 213-226 of the Labour Code and the amount of compensation is calculated on the basis of the gross remuneration for the last working month, unless otherwise provided (Art. 228).

== Termination agreement and termination of employment without notice ==
In Bulgaria each of the parties to the employment relationship can terminate it without the observance of deadlines given that mutual consent is present. The Labour Code, and in particular Art. 325(1) p. 1-12, regulates the grounds for termination of the employment relationship. The most important ground is termination due to inability of the employee to perform his work obligations in two very specific cases—as a result of an illness or if the employment of the employee is unreasonable for health reasons. In these two cases, under current legislation, it is not permitted to terminate the employment contract simply because of this reason. There should be no other suitable position compatible with the health of the worker in the company, or the worker should have declined to take it. Only then the employment relationship can be terminated legally.

== Termination by the employee ==
There are two ways for the employee to terminate the employment contract—through a proper notice that shall be given within the specified period, and extraordinary notice. In both cases this is a subjective right of the worker. According to Art. 326(2) of the Labour Code, the notice period varies depending on whether the working contract is permanent and temporary. In case of a permanent contract, the law in Bulgaria provides for a notice period of 30 days, as long as the parties have not previously agreed on a longer period (that shall not exceed 3 months). The minimum notice period for temporary contract termination is 3 months. In accordance with Art. 326(4) of the Labour Code the termination notice may be revoked by the employee simultaneously or prior to its receipt by the employer. Afterwards, a notice may be withdrawn by the end of the notice period with the consent of the employer (Art. 326(4) LC). It is possible for employees in Bulgaria to terminate the employment contract without notice as well, but only for a particular reason, as provided in Art.327 of the Labour Code. The most significant ground therein is a scenario where the employer is reluctant to pay the employee his due remuneration. Under the applicable labour law provisions even a delay of one day is sufficient for the employee to unilaterally terminate the employment relationship without complying with the usual notice periods.

== Termination by the employer ==
Art 328 of the Labour Code contains a number of grounds that could form the basis for unilateral termination of the employment relationship by the employer by written letter of resignation within the time limits set in Art.326(2) of the LC, including: shutting down the enterprise; dissolution of parts of the enterprise or staff reduction; decline in the volume of work; work stoppage lasting more than 15 working days; lack of essential characteristics of the employee for the effective fulfillment of employment obligations; lack of necessary training or professional qualifications; an employee's refusal to follow the enterprise in its transfer; upon reaching age of 65 for academics, docents and doctors of science; an objective impossibility to fulfill employment obligations.

Generally, the notice period in Bulgaria is 30 days, provided no agreement for a longer notice period has been reached (for a maximum of 3 months). Art. 329 of the Labour Code allows the employer to exercise the so-called suffrage (social choice) in cases of termination for partial enterprise dissolution operation, staff reduction or decrease in the volume of work. The employer may release those workers whose jobs are not subject to reduction, and retain instead employees with higher job performance level or qualifications if he deems that to be in the best interest of the enterprise. The proper conduct of these elections is a condition for the legality of the termination of the employment contract. Employers in Bulgaria can terminate the employment relationship in accordance with Art.330 para. 1 and para. 2 of the LC extraordinarily and without notice. This right arises, inter alia: during the arrest of the employee for the purpose of enforcement of a criminal conviction; when the employee is denied the right to exercise certain profession by a court or other state bodies; in withdrawing the academic degree of the employee which has been decisive for the conclusion of the employment contract; in withdrawal of the worker from the appropriate professional register (e.g. pharmacists, doctors, etc.); if the employee is released on disciplinary grounds. In Bulgaria, the employer may offer the employee to terminate the employment contract for payment of severance payment. If the employee does not accept in writing this offer within a period of 7 days, this is considered a rejection of the offer. If the worker accepts the offer, the employer is obliged to pay a compensation in the amount no less than four times his last gross monthly salary.

== Termination date ==
Art.335(2) of the Labour Code provides for the following possibilities in terms of termination date. In case of termination with notice—the date of expiry of the notice period; in case of non-compliance with the notice period—the date of expiry of the relevant part of the notice period; in case of termination without notice—the date of receipt of the termination order.

== Protection against unlawful dismissal ==
This protection applies in cases of termination of the contract by the employer. The legal basis for protection against unlawful dismissal in Bulgaria is to be found in Art. 344-346 and 225 (concerning compensation) of the Labour Code. The dismissal is unlawful in the following circumstances: when it is not conducted on any of the statutory grounds for termination; failure to comply with the provisional protection against dismissal; if the dismissal was not announced by the employer but by unauthorized party.

The protection against unlawful termination enables employees in Bulgaria to oppose to it in two ways. Art. 344 § 1 of the Labour code allows for the employee to file a lawsuit request and ask the court to declare the unlawfulness of the dismissal and cumulatively, to be recruited again at his previous workplace. The time between the entry into force of the termination order and its legal annulment is recognized as work experience.

As an independent legal action and as a second option, a compensation payment may be requested within a separate court procedure. A prerequisite for that is a court decision as to the illegality of the dismissal. The amount of the compensation payment due amounts to the gross salary for the month preceding the dismissal (Art. 228(1) of the LC). The compensation payment is payable for a period of 6 months.

== Deadlines and jurisdiction of the court ==
Under Art. 358(1)(2) of the LC the time limit for bringing a claim for unlawful dismissal is 2 months. A compensation claim can, on the other hand, be brought within a period of 3 years according to Art.358(1)(3) LC. The civil courts in Bulgaria are competent to hear the above-mentioned claims. Pursuant to Art. 359 Labour Code employees do not pay any court costs prior to the filing of the claims. Matters of jurisdiction in cases of individual employment contracts with an employer domiciled in the territory of an EU Member State are regulated by Section 5 of Regulation (EC) No. 44/2001 of the European Union (Council Regulation (EC) No. 44/2001). The provisions of the Regulation serve as a further protection for the employees by giving them the right to choose the competent court where to initiate proceedings. In this regard it is important to mention that the employer may be sued in the courts of the place where the employee habitually carries out his work or has lastly done so.
