= Solicitors Qualifying Examination =

Legal qualification in England and Wales

The Solicitors Qualifying Examination (SQE) is the main process of qualifying as a solicitor in England and Wales as of 2021. In order to be admitted to the roll of solicitors, a candidate must have tertiary education (level 6, not necessarily a degree) in any subject, pass two SQE assessments, complete qualifying work experience (QWE) for two years full-time (or part-time equivalent) and meet the Solicitors Regulation Authority (SRA)'s requirements for character and suitability. It is the solicitors' equivalent of the Bar Professional Training Course.

The four required elements of the SQE route to qualification do not need to be completed in a prescribed order; for example, QWE can be undertaken before, during or after a candidate sits SQE1 or 2.

While the SQE refers specifically to the two exams which candidates must sit, in practice the term is often also used in reference to the current solicitors' training programme as a whole, including the transition from the traditional Training Contract to Qualifying Work Experience.

== History ==
The Legal Services Board approved the SQE on 28 October 2020, after nine years of consultation on solicitors' training. It came into effect in Autumn 2021, with anyone starting to qualify as a solicitor in 2022 onwards having to take the SQE route. A 10-year transition period to 2031 will allow the completion of qualifications commenced under the previous regime. Candidate that have taken the LPC may be exempt from the SQE1 under transitional arrangements.

=== Previous routes ===
Articled clerkship

The historical route to qualification as a solicitor in England & Wales, introduced on 1 December 1730, was articled clerkship. This term is still retained by some common law jurisdictions. Clerkship lasted for 5 years, which in 1843 was reduced to 3 years for some graduates. In 1728 a group of solicitors established the "Society of Gentlemen Practisers in the Courts of Law and Equity", the predecessor of the Law Society of England & Wales; this is the body is responsible for solicitor training in the jurisdiction. In 1877, the Law Society began administering a series of exams in order to allow admittance into the profession. The term and requirements of clerkship continued to evolve during the 20th century.

==== Qualifications immediately prior to the SQE ====
Established in 1993 to replace the Law Society's Final Examination (LSF), the LPC was one of four routes to qualifying as a solicitor in England and Wales: for candidates with a law degree (Legal Practice Course), for those with a different degree (Common Professional Examination), for those qualifying in a different country (Qualified Lawyers Transfer Scheme), and for qualified legal executives. The process is now simpler: any candidate with any background must undertake the SQE.

== SQE1 & SQE2 ==
=== SQE1 ===
The SQE1 consists of two functioning legal knowledge (FLK) assessments, of 180 multiple-choice questions. Candidates must apply their knowledge of the law, the fundamental legal principles and rules, to demonstrate the competences required to the level of a newly qualified solicitor of England and Wales.

==== Functioning Legal Knowledge 1 (FLK 1) ====
- Ethics
- Business Law and Practice (including Tax)
- Dispute Resolution
- Contract Law
- Tort Law
- Constitutional and Administrative Law, and EU Law, and Legal Services

==== Functioning Legal Knowledge 2 (FLK 2) ====
- Ethics
- Land Law
- Property Practice (including Tax)
- Wills and the Administration of Estates (including Tax)
- Trust Law
- Criminal Law and Practice
- Solicitors' Accounts

=== SQE2 ===
The SQE2 assessment is divided into two parts, although there is one pass mark for the assessment as a whole:

==== Oral ====
The client interviewing skills and completion of an attendance note and advocacy skills are tested through four oral exams that take place over two half days.

- Day 1: Advocacy (Dispute Resolution); interview and attendance note/legal analysis (Property Practice)
- Day 2: Advocacy (Criminal Litigation); interview and attendance note/legal analysis (Wills and Intestacy, Probate Administration and Practice)

==== Written ====
Legal research, legal writing, legal drafting and case and matter analysis are tested in the five areas of law taking place over three half days.

- Day 1: Dispute Resolution and Criminal Litigation
- Day 2: Property Practice and Wills and Intestacy, Probate Administration and Practice
- Day 3: Business Organisations, Rules and Procedures

== SQE pass rates ==
The SRA has released a report detailing pass rates following reach sitting of the SQE1 and 2. As of January 2024 the pass rates are:

- SQE1: 51%
- SQE2: 61%

== Cost of examinations ==
The cost of the SQE exams have increased in line with inflation. From September 2024, the cost of the exams are:

- SQE1 - £1,888 (£944 for FLK1 and £944 for FLK2)
- SQE2 - £2,902

Student must pay full price to re-sit.

== Qualifying Work Experience (QWE) ==
All candidates who wish to qualify through the SQE route must complete two years' full-time (or equivalent) qualifying work experience (QWE). QWE is intended to take the place of the Training contract under the old regime.

In larger firms, it is common for QWE to be structured similarly to training contracts under the old system, with a structured rotation among departments. However, this is not a requirement of QWE. A candidate is required to develop at least two of the SRA's solicitors competences while providing legal services per the Legal Services Act 2007 (s.12). QWE must be registered with the SRA and signed-off by a solicitor.

QWE is intended to be flexible: candidates may undertake QWE in up to four different organizations; it does not have to be in England & Wales; it can be paid or voluntary; and it could be spent:

- on placement during a law degree,
- working in a law clinic,
- at a voluntary or charitable organisation or a law centre,
- working as a paralegal,
- on a training contract.

== Foreign Qualified Lawyers ==
The SQE replaced the previous route to qualification for foreign qualified lawyers, the Qualified Lawyers Transfer Test (QLTS). Under the SQE regime, foreign qualified lawyers may be exempt from QWE and the SQE2.

== Criticism ==
Following consultations, the SQE was introduced by the SRA to simplify the qualification process in England & Wales and reduce the financial burden upon students. The following are the main criticisms of the SQE:

- Cost: the total cost of the exam from September 2024 will be £4,790. Although not mandatory, preparation courses are taken by most students. One such course from the University of Law costs £17,800, making the potential total upwards of £22,590. This figure is higher than the previous route to qualification the Legal Practice Course.
- Results: the company awarded the contract to run the SQE, Kaplan, Inc., wrongly told 175 of the 6,626 candidates who sat SQE 1 in January 2024 that they had failed the exam.
- Difficulty: the level assessed by the SQE is higher than that of the LPC. Whereas the LPC assessed candidates to the level of a day-one trainee, the SQE assesses to the standard of a day-one solicitor. In this sense, it is comparable to the New York Bar Examination and other United States bar exams, but it still requires 2 years of QWE to qualify.

== See also ==
- Bar examination England and Wales
- Articled clerk
- Law Society of England and Wales
- Solicitors Regulation Authority
- Legal education
  - Common Professional Examination (CPE) - conversion course for non-law graduates
  - Bar Professional Training Course (BPTC) - equivalent course for intending barristers
  - Postgraduate Certificate in Laws (PCLL) - equivalent course in Hong Kong
  - Qualified Lawyers Transfer Scheme (QLTS) is a series of tests for the licence to practise as solicitor in England and Wales designed for foreign licensed attorneys; this has been replaced by the SQE
- List of areas of law
- List of largest UK law firms
- Solicitor
- Trainee solicitor
