= Qualified Lawyers Transfer Scheme =

English examinations for foreign lawyers

Qualified Lawyers Transfer Scheme (QLTS) is a series of two examinations for the license to practice as a solicitor in England and Wales designed for foreign-licensed lawyers. The QLTS supplanted the Qualified Lawyers Transfer Test (QLTT) on 1 September 2010. The QLTS assessment was designed to increase the number of recognised foreign jurisdictions for the examinations. These changes have opened up the English legal market to qualified lawyers from places as diverse as Korea, Japan and Russia.

== Format ==
The QLTS assessment has two parts: a Multiple Choice Test (MCT) and an Objective Structured Clinical Examination (OSCE). The MCT consists of 180 multiple-choice questions, and the OSCE consists of the following exercises covering five practice areas (business, property, probate, civil litigation and criminal litigation) over six days: client interview, completion of attendance note/case analysis, advocacy/oral presentation, legal drafting, legal research and legal writing. The QLTS assessment tests the skills that the Solicitors Regulation Authority expects a solicitor to possess on the first day of legal practice, hence the name "Day-One Outcomes". If you are an LPC graduate, you are eligible to claim exemption from the MCT.

=== Comparison with the Multistate Bar Examination (MBE) ===
The questions on the MCT are similar in format to those on the Multistate Bar Examination (MBE) in the United States, but the content is much broader than that of the MBE. In particular, the MCT tests a candidate's knowledge of solicitors' accounts, criminal procedure (not related to constitutional law), tax, bankruptcy, conveyancing, and corporate transactional procedure, topics not found on the MBE.

== Training and Testing ==
One of the major reasons stated by the Solicitors Regulation Authority for the creation of the new QLTS was the need to separate training and testing. In contrast to the old QLTT system, the QLTS maintains only one testing authority, Kaplan QLTS (which is a part of Kaplan, Inc.). The testing authority is not allowed to provide training or tuition for the examinations. There are providers who offer training for the QLTS assessment, but SRA cannot endorse or recommend any provider.

== Future of the QLTS ==
In May 2017, the Solicitors Regulation Authority (SRA) announced the establishment of a new “super exam” called the Solicitors Qualifying Examination (SQE), which would gradually replace the QLTS, the LPC and the Graduate Diploma in Law.

In August 2018, the SRA announced that Kaplan had been granted the contract to develop and run the exam for eight years. The SQE will be a two-part national assessment, SQE1 costing £1,558 and SQE2 costing £2,422, and will come into force from 1 September 2021, subject to approval from the Legal Services Board (LSB).

The SQE has officially come into force as of 1 September 2021. The last MCT took place in July 2021 and the last OSCE will take place in April 2022. Those that have passed both the MCT and the OSCE must apply for admission by 31 August 2022. Those that have passed only the MCT may take the SQE2 exam instead of the OSCE, in which case the application for admission would need to be made by 31 August 2023.
