= Bar review =

Bar exam preparation classes

A bar review is a series of classes that most law school graduates in the United States attend prior to taking a bar examination, in order to prepare for that exam. A typical bar review course will last for several weeks, beginning a few weeks after law school graduation and running until a few weeks before the next administration of the bar examination. "A full service bar review course prepares a student for both portions of a state's bar examination: multistate and state law. A supplemental bar review course prepares a student for only one portion of a state's bar examination". Classes may be held in person, online, or with prerecorded material delivered to the student.

Bar review courses are heavily marketed to graduating law students, as noted by Judge Diarmuid O'Scannlain of the United States Court of Appeals for the Ninth Circuit, which examined that practice in an unfair competition case:

Bar review course sponsors compete for potential customers on law school campuses through distribution of advertising fliers, sponsored student events, and advertisements in student newspapers. These businesses promote their courses directly to law students throughout their three years of law school. Some law students are employed as sales representatives to market courses to their classmates, and full-time sales personnel "table sit" at law schools to promote their firm's courses.

Many companies offering bar review courses also offer a component to prepare bar takers for the Multistate Professional Responsibility Examination (MPRE).
