= Accredited specialist solicitor (Australia) =

Credential for Australian lawyers

To be given the title "accredited specialist", is the highest accreditation attainable as a solicitor in Australia. To become an accredited specialist, a solicitor must meet certain requirements and go through various examination stages, testing their skills and knowledge in the specific area of the law that they are competent in. Once a solicitor fulfils the requirements, they are entitled to use the prestigious title of accredited specialist after their name to differentiate themselves as experts in that area of law.

== History ==
Specialist accreditation was established in 1992 with aims to:

- Provide the profession and public with a reliable means of identifying a practitioner with proven expertise in their chosen area of law;
- Contribute to and encourage continues development and improvement of standards, quality and delivery of legal services;
- Promote the advancement of legal knowledge and skills; and
- Provide practitioners with the opportunity to demonstrate expertise in their chosen are of law and to have this recognised.

To become an accredited specialist a solicitor needs to meet the following requirements:

- Hold a current solicitor's practising certificate;
- Be a current solicitor member of the Law society or full solicitor member of an equivalent body in an Australian state or territory;
- Be engaged in the practice of law full-time for at least 5 years;
- In each of the three years immediately preceding your application, have been engaged in the area of practice of law in which you would like to become an accreditation specialist;
- In the three years preceding this application, have practiced in the area for not less than 25% of full-time practice.

== Specialist Accreditation exam ==
The Specialist Accreditation exam occurs every year but once every two years for a specific area of law. For example, there was a specialist accreditation exam for Immigration law in 2018, you'll be expecting the next exam in 2020.

The accreditation process takes approximately 6–7 months until results are released. The processes are as follow:

- Submitting application for specialist accreditation before closing date
- Take home assessments where solicitors are given a timeframe to complete
- Formal written exams and live assessments
- Results released

== Areas of law ==
Only solicitors as individuals can become an accredited specialist, not firms. As of 2025, specialist accreditation is offered in the following areas of law:

- Australian immigration law (also see the Migration Act)
- Advocacy
- Business law
- Children's Law
- Commercial litigation
- Criminal law
- Dispute resolution
- Employment & Industrial relations
- Family law
- Government & Administrative law
- Local government and planning law
- Mediation
- Personal injury law
- Planning & Environment law
- Property law
- Public law
- Taxation law – also see Taxation in Australia
- Wills & Estates law

A new area and the most recent addition, Elder Law, was announced in 2024 and will be available as part of the 2026 program.

== See also ==
- Law Council of Australia
- Federal Circuit Court of Australia
- Law of Australia
- Australian Law Reform Commission
- New South Wales Law Reform Commission
