= OLPAS =

The Online Pupillage Application System, or OLPAS was a centralised service through which students applied for pupillage, the last stage of their training to barrister in England and Wales. It was a replacement for 'PACH' the Pupillage Application Clearing House, and it was replaced in 2009 by a new, similar, system called Pupillage Portal. Previously, applications could be submitted for either the summer or autumn 'season', with deadlines in April and September in the year before pupillage was due to commence. Individual chambers were able to choose in which season they wished to recruit. The Pupillage Portal has done away with this, and operates just one round of applications annually.

The system is free of charge and consists of an online application form in which applicants may include their educational details, as well as work experience and career motivation. The service allows applicants to apply to a maximum of twelve chambers each season. Chambers that choose not to make use of the Portal have their own application procedures and forms, and may set different deadlines for each year's applications.

== See also ==
- Pupillage
