= Nigel Savage (academic) =

British academic lawyer (born 1950)

Professor Richard Nigel Savage (born 27 May 1950) is a British academic lawyer. He was Dean of the Nottingham Law School, then Chief Executive of the College of Law of England and Wales, becoming the first President of its successor, The University of Law.

== Early life ==
Savage is the younger son of Jack Savage and his wife Joan Scarborough, of Southwell, Nottinghamshire, where his grandfather Edward Scarborough was a law clerk.

The young Savage was educated at the Edward Cludd School, Southwell, Newark Technical College, Manchester Polytechnic, where he graduated BA with 1st class honours in 1972, the University of Sheffield (LLM, 1974), and the University of Strathclyde, where he gained a PhD in 1980.

== Career ==
Savage was a lecturer at the University of Strathclyde from 1974 to 1983, when he was appointed as a principal lecturer at the Nottingham Law School of Nottingham Polytechnic. He was professor of law there from 1985 to 1996, and also Dean and managing director, from 1989 to 1996. In 1994, he called for a review of the link between the College of Law and the Law Society of England and Wales, proposing that the college should either "come clean" about the nature of the relationship and declare itself the official college of the Law Society, or else should sever the link and become independent. The college subsequently severed the link, and in 1996 Savage was appointed as its Chief Executive. He served in that role until 2013, when he became the first President of the college's successor the University of Law. He was also a member of the Higher Education Funding Council for England from 2002 to 2009. He retired from the University of Law in April 2014.

Savage was Chairman of Savage Hutchinson Consulting Ltd, 2014–2020, and a non-executive director of Fletchers Solicitors Ltd, 2014–2021. He has been a Consultant to the National Centre for Citizenship and the Law since 2014.

== Personal life ==
In 1976, in Newark, Savage married Linda Jane Sherwin, and they had two sons. They were divorced in 2006, and in 2010 he married Sarah Hutchinson.

== Honours ==
- 2015: Honorary degree of Doctor of Laws, University of Law
