= Pupil master =

A pupil master ('pupilmaster' or 'pupil-master') or, in the case of a female barrister, 'pupil mistress' etc., is the former name given to an experienced barrister who a pupil shadows during their pupillage. The terms have now been replaced by the term 'pupil supervisor'. Barristers are called to the Bar via one of the four Inns of Court upon successful completion of the BPTC and having undertaken a required number of "qualifying sessions" in their chosen Inn of Court. In most cases, the newly called barrister is then required to undertake training for a period of at least a year before being able to start their own private practice.

The training period, known as pupillage, is usually split into two periods of six months known as "sixes". The first "six" is a non-practising six, during which the pupil will shadow their pupil master; the second is usually a practising "six", when the pupil, with their pupil master's permission, can undertake the supply of legal services and exercise rights of audience in court. Occasionally, a pupil barrister may undertake a third "six", extending the training period a further six months. At the end of pupillage, to continue practising the law, a barrister may attempt to become a tenant in a set of barristers' chambers or find a position as an employed barrister.
