= NLS Legal =

Teaching law firm operated by Nottingham Trent University

- Formation: 2014
- Type: Teaching law firm
- Headquarters: Chaucer Building, Nottingham, England
- Region served: England and Wales
- Head of NLS Legal: Laura Pinkney
- Affiliations: Nottingham Trent University
- Website: https://www.ntu.ac.uk/study-and-courses/academic-schools/nottingham-law-school/nls-legal

NLS Legal is a not-for-profit teaching law firm operated by Nottingham Law School at Nottingham Trent University in Nottingham, England. It provides free or low-cost legal advice, assistance and representation to individuals, businesses and charities who are unable to afford, or otherwise access legal services, while offering supervised practical experience to law students.

NLS Legal operates as a regulated Alternative Business Structure and is described by Nottingham Trent University as the only UK law school with an on-campus teaching law firm integrated into its legal education provision.

== History ==
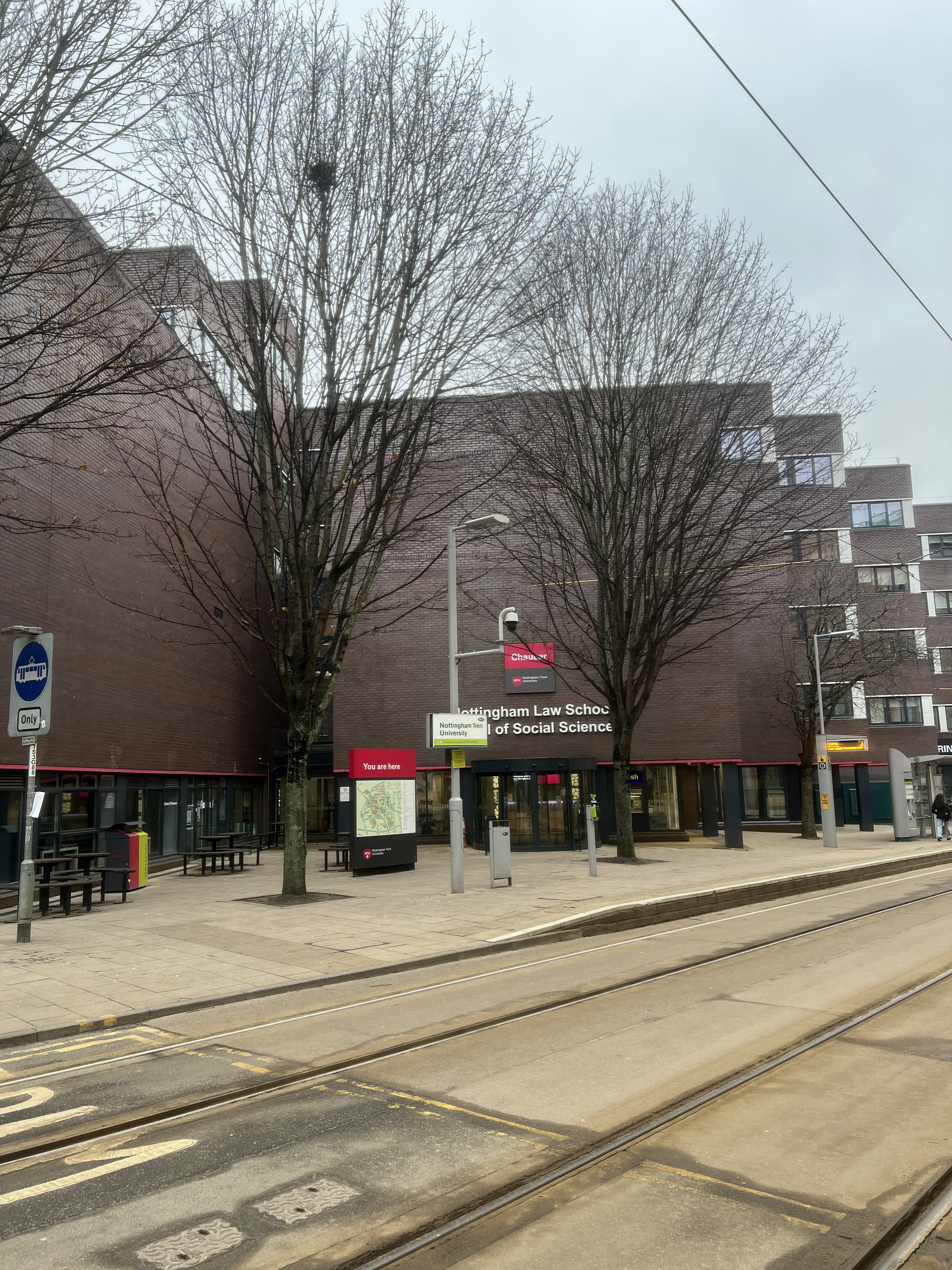
Chaucer Building, Home to NLS Legal

NLS Legal was launched in 2014 as the Nottingham Law School Legal Advice Centre and was formally incorporated as a company limited by guarantee in September 2014. The service was officially opened by the attorney general.

In July 2022, the organisation changed its name from Nottingham Law School Legal Advice Centre Limited to NLS Legal Limited.

In 2024, NLS Legal marked its tenth anniversary.

== Organisation and regulation ==
NLS Legal is based within the Chaucer Building at Nottingham Trent University’s City Campus, with facilities designed to maintain client confidentiality.

The firm is authorised and regulated by the Solicitors Regulation Authority as a licensed body law practice (Alternative Business Structure). It is incorporated as a private company limited by guarantee without share capital.

Legal services are delivered by Nottingham Law School students working under the supervision of qualified solicitors and experienced lawyers.

== Services ==
NLS Legal provides free or low-cost advice across a range of legal practice areas for individuals, businesses and charities. Practice areas include civil litigation, employment, family, housing, welfare benefits, intellectual property, and business and enterprise law, as well as specialist areas such as Special Educational Needs and Disability (SEND) and victims’ rights.

== Educational role ==
As a teaching law firm, NLS Legal supports experiential learning within Nottingham Law School by providing supervised opportunities for students to participate in client work including interviewing, legal research, drafting advice, negotiation and representation where appropriate.

Nottingham Trent University reports that since its inception more than 2,100 student volunteers have supported over 1,900 clients and helped recover more than £6 million in compensation and welfare benefits.

== Recognition ==
Nottingham Trent University reports that in 2025 NLS Legal received the ALM Leadership, Influence & Inclusivity in Law – Justice Beyond the Courtroom Award.

== See also ==
- Nottingham Law School
- Legal clinic
- Pro bono
