= Legal Practice Course =

Postgraduate course for solicitors

The Legal Practice Course (LPC) – also known as the Postgraduate Diploma in Legal Practice – is a postgraduate course and the final educational stage for becoming a solicitor in England, Wales and Australia (where it is commonly known as "practical legal training" or "PLT"). The course is designed to provide a bridge between academic study and training in a law firm. It is a one-year, full-time (or two-year, part-time) course, and tuition fees range from £8,000-£17,300 a year. A small proportion of students may have their fees and some living expenses paid for by future employers under a training contract.

The course is usually taken after a law degree, but a large minority take the course after studying a different subject at university and taking a conversion course called the Graduate Diploma in Law (GDL/CPE). The LPC is regulated through the Law Society of England and Wales and replaced the Law Society's Final Examination (LSF) in 1993. Like the GDL/CPE, the LPC can be applied to through the Central Applications Board.

The LPC is also offered to LLB graduates at some Australian universities, as an alternative to an articled clerkship. In Scotland, the equivalent is the Diploma in Professional Legal Practice.

== Course content ==
The course content can be broadly classified into three phases of learning. These are (a) "Core" compulsory modules, (b) "Elective" modules and (c) practical skills. Skills comprise advocacy, interviewing and advising, writing, drafting and research, solicitors' accounts, wills and administration and taxation.

Generally taught in the first (and longest) part of the course, the compulsory modules are generally Criminal Litigation, Business Law and Practice, Property Law and Practice, and Civil litigation. In the shorter second part of the course, students select their "Elective" modules from a list chosen by the providing institution.

Topics vary from institution to institution, but those widely available include advanced courses in the compulsory modules, along with: personal injury, family law, employment law, housing law, immigration law, probate and private client, commercial law, welfare law and commercial property law. Some topics recur throughout the teaching of all course topics and can come up in all examinations. These include: professional conduct, restricted activities under the Financial Services and Markets Act 2000, business accounts and taxation.

== Eligibility and length ==
Different institutions require different grades before accepting candidates onto their course. Institutions will often interview students with third class degrees before accepting them while only some will interview before accepting a candidate with a lower second. The course generally lasts nine months and has substantially less holiday than an undergraduate course. Emphasis is placed on class room teaching alongside independent study.

== Quality of different institutions ==
LPC providers are inspected by the Solicitors Regulation Authority, commonly referred to as the SRA, with the intention of maintaining high standards throughout the sector. Some providers are notably more expensive than others and will often be able to spend more money on both staff and facilities.

== Pass rates ==
In 2005, a total of 6,554 people passed the LPC, an overall rate of 84%, representing a 3% rise from the previous year. It is possible to sit all LPC exams three times before failing the course. It is necessary to pass all subjects.

9,337 students enrolled on the LPC in 2008/09. Quite a few deferred their exams or dropped out altogether, leaving 7,759 to take the exam; 5,824 of those passed the exams that year (75% of those who entered), just over the number of training contracts on offer (5,809). Training contracts with big firms tend to start recruitment 2 years in advance i.e. 2 years before completion of the LPC.

== Funding ==
The Law Society has a bursary scheme, this is available for some candidates who have already taken the LPC. Upon securing and commencing a training contract the recipient individual gets their fees paid through Law Society funds.

It is not uncommon for law firms to provide sponsorship to LPC students as part of a job offer. Generally sponsorship is only offered by wealthy commercial practices, although a limited number of legal aid sponsorship packages (funded by the Law Society of England and Wales) do exist.

Banks do offer preferential bank loans to post-graduate students in employment. This is an expensive option with loans of up to £25,000 being available. Alternatively, information on professional career development loans run by the National Careers Service can be found on the National Careers Service website, or in Job Centres.

== Criticism ==
- Relevancy: The LPC has been criticised by some professionals as being too broad. All students have to take the compulsory subjects detailed above, regardless of whether they want a 'high street' career or a 'commercial' one. The broad basis of the course could be seen as bringing increased legal awareness to future professionals.
- Redundant Components: Certain components, such as the Interviewing and Advising skill assessment, have been criticised as being redundant. The Interviewing and Advising skill assessment creates a highly artificial scenario in which a trainee solicitor interviews a client and then proceeds to render impromptu legal advice.
- Length: The process of becoming a solicitor has been described as, 'lengthy, demanding and academically difficult. The LPC adds an extra year (or 7 months, if one is on an "Accelerated" course) onto the process of qualifying.
- Commercial bias: Commercial legal practices are far more likely to be able to provide financial sponsorship for the LPC, this means that students from disadvantaged backgrounds have a strong financial incentive not to go into legal aid work such as crime, family and civil liberties - as legal aid firms cannot afford to sponsor the LPC. Commentators such as Clare Dyer (journalist at The Guardian) have spoken of a legal aid 'crisis' in regard to trainees.
- Elective element: The elective element of the LPC has been criticised as 'unnecessary,' as it lengthens the course and burdens students with extra costs. The elective element is the part of the course that allows students to specialise in line with their future career.
- Number of places: There have been criticisms that the number of places offered each year by LPC Providers massively outstrips the number of vacancies for training contracts (According to the latest Law Society Annual Statistical report there were 5,411 new training contracts registered and just over 8,000 students sitting the LPC). Taking the LPC can cause many students considerable debt and no return on their investment whatsoever.

== Future of the Legal Practice Course ==
In May 2017, the Solicitors Regulation Authority (SRA) announced the establishment of a new "super exam" called the Solicitors Qualifying Examination (SQE), which would gradually replace the LPC and the Graduate Diploma in Law.

In August 2018, the SRA announced that Kaplan had been granted the contract to develop and run the exam for eight years. The SQE will be a two-part national assessment, SQE1 costing £1,558 and SQE2 costing £2,422, and will come into force from 1 September 2021, subject to approval from the Legal Services Board (LSB).

== See also ==
- Articled clerk
- Law Society of England and Wales
- Legal education
  - Common Professional Examination (CPE) - conversion course for non-law graduates
  - Bar Professional Training Course (BPTC) - equivalent course for intending barristers
  - Postgraduate Certificate in Laws (PCLL) - equivalent course in Hong Kong
  - Qualified Lawyers Transfer Scheme (QLTS) is a series of tests for the licence to practise as solicitor in England and Wales designed for foreign licensed attorneys.
- List of areas of law
- List of largest UK law firms
- Solicitor
- Trainee solicitor
