= Legal executive =

Person with legal training

Chartered Legal Executive
Occupation
- Occupation type: Profession
- Activity sectors: Law

Description
- Competencies: Interpersonal skills, analytical mind, critical thinking, commercial sense
- Education required: Chartered Institute of Legal Executives, Legal Practice Course
- Fields of employment: Law firm, Government Legal Service, in-house
- Related jobs: Solicitor; Barrister; Notary public Paralegal; Legal assistant Legal secretary

Legal executives are a kind of trained legal professional in certain jurisdictions. They often specialise in a particular area of law. A legal executive usually receives both vocational training (a minimum of 3 years for those in England and Wales) and academic training.

Legal executives are associated with different membership bodies and different rights according to geographical regions. Legal executives are recognised in Northern Ireland, the Republic of Ireland, New Zealand, Australia, Singapore, Hong Kong, and the Bahamas. There is no direct equivalent to a legal executive in Scotland. In England and Wales they hold chartered status and are members of the Chartered Institute of Legal Executives (CILEX).

== England and Wales ==
=== Overview ===
Chartered Legal Executives in England and Wales are lawyers. They can become partners in law firms and are eligible to become judges and advocates subject to meeting eligibility requirements. As lawyers, they are subject to stringent regulation and a code of ethics as with barristers and solicitors.

Chartered Legal Executives (formerly known as Fellows of CILEX) qualify after completing their CILEX training followed by a minimum of 3 years qualifying employment. Chartered Legal Executives may do a wide range of legal work although, like solicitors, they generally specialise in one area:

- residential and commercial conveyancing
- wills probate work and trusts
- personal injury
- family law
- criminal law
- employment law
- immigration law
- litigation
- practice management

After completing their academic training, trainee Legal Executives often occupy paralegal roles to satisfy the 3 year vocational stage of qualifying as Chartered Legal Executives.

=== History ===
The modern chartered legal executive evolved from the 19th-century managing clerk. When solicitor firms started to grow in the 19th century, they increasingly relied on an ever-expanding number of clerks for drafting, copying, and organizing documents. The ratio of clerks to solicitors increased from 0.86 in 1850 to 2.09 in 1900. Some of these clerks in turn became knowledgeable about the law and were allowed to manage their fellow clerks; hence, they were called managing clerks. The typical arrangement was that each solicitor was assisted by a managing clerk, and each managing clerk in turn was assisted by one or more junior clerks.

In the 1950s and 1960s England suffered a shortage of solicitors when population growth unexpectedly exceeded the number of entrants into the profession. To improve the availability of legal services, the Law Society began aggressive recruitment efforts to convince young people to choose law as a career. As part of this effort, the Law Society decided to turn the managing clerk into a true legal profession of its own and sponsored the creation of the Institute of Legal Executives (ILEX) in 1963 as well as the change in title to legal executive. In the Law Society's own words, ILEX was intended "to stimulate recruitment to the unadmitted ranks of the professional status ... and would offer ... a career with proper incentives".

In October 2011, ILEX was granted a royal charter and achieved chartered professional body status. On 30 January 2012, after the charter was formally issued by Minister of Justice Jonathan Djanogly, ILEX was officially launched as the "Chartered Institute of Legal Executives" (CILEX).

=== CILEX ===
The Chartered Institute of Legal Executives (CILEX) was founded in 1892 as the Solicitors Managing Clerks' Association and became the Institute of Legal Executives, a company limited by guarantee, in 1963 with the support of the Law Society of England and Wales. In England and Wales the Institute of Legal Executives received a Royal Charter in early 2012 to become the Chartered Institute of Legal Executives (CILEX). Fully qualified members of CILEX in England and Wales are now therefore referred to as "Chartered Legal Executives".

CILEX is a professional body which represents Chartered legal executive lawyers and other legal practitioners and law staff. It has around 20,000 members. All members of CILEX are independently regulated by ILEX Professional Standards (IPS), regardless of grade.

To qualify as a Chartered Legal Executive, aspiring Chartered Legal Executives undertake a series of training courses and are required to pass qualifications relevant to the area of practice in which they intend to specialise. The first stage for the full vocational route to qualifying is called the CILEX Level 3 Professional Diploma in Law and Practice and is set at the equivalent to A-level law. The second and final qualifications are equivalent to an honours degree course - the CILEX Level 6 Diploma in Law and Practice. Trainees will often work at the same time as studying in order to acquire practical skills. The courses can be undertaken at a college, university or through an open learning programme. The courses are open to graduates and non-graduates.

A trainee must also gain 3 years' vocational experience before being admitted as a Fellow.

==== Membership Grades ====
===== Fellows =====
Only Fellows of CILEX (FCILEX) can lawfully hold themselves out as Chartered Legal Executives and are qualified by law (by way of CILEX) to be commissioners of oaths able to take depositions and affidavits. Fellows also can bring action in court and appear for clients in certain courts. Appearance in courts requires a separate CILEX qualification to become a Chartered Legal Executive Advocate. Fellows (that is, Chartered Legal Executives) are also eligible to apply and compete with barristers and solicitors for appointment to certain judicial offices, such as the position of deputy or district judge.

===== Membership levels =====
In September 2009, the CILEX training in England and Wales changed. The CILEX qualification now emphasises and examines the practical work of the law as well as continuing with the necessary academic examinations. At the same time, a number of new membership grades were introduced by CILEX. CILEX now offers the following membership categories which can be joined according to experience and qualifications held:

- student member - for those wishing to enter the legal profession, who have no relevant legal qualification, or those with less than three years’ work experience of a predominantly legal nature.
- affiliate member - for those with at least one CILEX level-3 unit-qualifications, or who have completed a relevant level-2 legal qualification, or gained at least three years’ work of a predominantly legal nature.
- associate member – for those who have completed their CILEX level-3 Professional Diploma in Law and Practice (the first stage of CILEX qualifications), or who are graduates with qualifying law degrees. Associate members will be entitled to use the designatory letters ACILEX after their name and be required to undertake continuing professional development (CPD).
- graduate member - for those who have completed both their CILEX level-3 Professional Diploma in Law and Practice and their CILEX level-6 Professional Higher Diploma in Law and Practice (including the CILEX Graduate ‘Fast-Track’ Diploma, or who are Legal Practice Course (LPC) or Bar Vocational Course (BVC) graduates. Graduate members will be entitled to use the designatory letters GCILEX after their name and be required to undertake CPD.

Students already holding a Legal Practice Course (LPC) or Bar Professional Training Course (BPTC) qualifications are exempt from the CILEX academic qualifications and can immediately apply to become a graduate member. Graduate members must then work under the supervision of a qualified legal executive or a solicitor at a firm, either in-house at a private company or in government (provided their work is substantially of a legal rather than administrative nature). To apply to become a Fellow of the Chartered Institute they must have a minimum of three years' practical legal experience.

Once a student has successfully completed a period of qualifying employment, he or she will become a Fellow of CILEX, a qualified lawyer and will be allowed to hold themselves out as a Chartered Legal Executive and use the designatory letters FCILEX. Fellows (and other member grades) are required to maintain and improve their knowledge by undertaking CPD each year. A proportion of those hours must relate to their area of specialism. Fellows are issued an annual practising certificate. Only qualified and practicing Fellows of the Chartered Institute of Legal Executives may use the designatory title 'Chartered Legal Executives' which is a protected designation for practicing Fellows under its Royal Charter.

A CILEX Fellow who wishes to go on to qualify as a solicitor is usually allowed to forego the training contract aspect. For this exemption to apply, they must have attained fellowship level by the time they complete the vocational stage of solicitor training, i.e. the LPC. It goes without saying they must also have completed the academic stage; however, having come through the CILEX route to qualification, this usually means taking advanced modules of the CILEX level-6 qualification.

== Other Jurisdictions ==
=== Australia ===
The Institute of Legal Executives (Victoria) was set up in 1966 and represents legal executives in the state of Victoria, it works with the Institute of Legal Executives (Australia) which was formed in 1994 and represents legal executives in the rest of Australia. Both Legal Executives organisations in Australia work to formalise legal training and promote education for the position of Legal Executive. They award Diplomas, Certificates in Professional Legal studies, as well as prizes and bursaries for students. In South Australia the law society provides an equivalent association for paralegals.

=== Hong Kong ===
The Law Society of Hong Kong set benchmark standards for those using the title 'Legal Executive' in Hong Kong. Legal Executive title holders may have limited rights of audience in accordance with the Court’s Practice Direction in the District Court and High Court. HKUSPACE (an extension of The University of Hong Kong) runs two programs to meet the Law Society of Hong Kong benchmarks The Vocational Training Council member IVE also has a Professional Diploma program to become a qualified Legal Executive. It also has a fulltime program.

=== Republic of Ireland ===
The Irish Institute of Legal Executives IILEX is the professional body representing legal executives in Ireland and with the stated aim to provide a system of training and examination and to obtain a recognised professional qualification for those engaged in legal work in Ireland.

==== Categories of IILEX Membership ====
- Senior Legal Executive Member S.I.I.L.Ex.
- Legal Executive Member M.I.I.L.Ex.
- Associate Member ACILEx
- Student Legal Executive Member

=== New Zealand ===
The New Zealand Institute of Legal Executives is an incorporated society which advances and protects the status and interests of legal executives. At present it has approximately 650 members.

=== The Bahamas ===
In The Bahamas, Legal Executives, like other members of the legal profession, are governed by and regulated in accordance with the provisions of the Legal Profession Act. The Legal Profession Act tasks the Registrar of the Supreme Court of the Commonwealth of The Bahamas with keeping a register which is known simply as the Register of Legal Executives.

Whereas Legal Executives practising in England and Wales now enjoy certain rights of audience, in The Bahamas, Legal Executives may only appear before a particular tribunal or authority after the attorney-general has had consultations with the Bar Council of the Bahamas Bar Association.

In The Bahamas, under the Legal Profession Act, it is unlawful for a person to hold himself or herself out as a Legal Executive if their name does not appear on the Register of Legal Executives. Any person who is found to be guilty of pretending to be a Legal Executive can be liable upon conviction to a fine of B$5,000.00, or imprisonment for a period of three years, or both.

=== Germany ===
The equivalent profession in Germany is Rechtsbeistand.

Rechtsbeistände may be licensed to practice specific areas of law or provide services encompassing the entire scope of the law. The qualification was gained after attendance of vocational courses building on experience that candidates may have gained e.g. as lawyers' clerks or tax accountants. A university degree in law was not required.

Admission is no longer available, with the very few remaining Rechtsbeistände all having been admitted to practice before 1980.
