= List of areas of law =

The following is a list of major areas of legal practice and important legal subject-matters.

== By area of study and practice ==
- Administrative law
- Admiralty law or maritime law
- Adoption law
- Agency law
- Alcohol law
- Alternative dispute resolution
- Animal law
- Antitrust law (or competition law)
- Art law (or art and culture law)
- Aviation law
- Banking law
- Bankruptcy law (creditor debtor rights law or insolvency and reorganization law)
- Bioethics
- Business law (or commercial law); commercial litigation
- Business organizations law (or companies law)
- Canon law
- Civil law or common law
- Class action litigation/Mass tort litigation
- Communications law
- Computer law
- Competition law
- Conflict of law (or private international law)
- Constitutional law
- Construction law
- Consumer law
- Contract law
- Copyright law
- Corporate law (or company law), also corporate compliance law and corporate governance law
- Criminal law
- Cryptography law
- Cultural property law
- Custom (law)
- Cyber law
- Defamation
- Drug control law
- Education law
- Elder law
- Employment law
- Energy law
- Entertainment law
- Environmental law
- Family law
- Financial services regulation law
- Firearm law
- Food law
- Gaming law
- Health and safety law
- Health law
- Housing law
- Immigration law
- Insurance law
- Intellectual property law
- International law
- International human rights law
- International humanitarian law
- International trade and finance law
- Internet law
- Juvenile law
- Labour law (or Labor law)
- Landlord–tenant law
- Litigation
- Martial law
- Media law
- Medical law
- Military law
- Mining law
- Mortgage law
- Music law
- Nationality law
- Obscenity law
- Parliamentary law
- Patent law
- Poverty law
- Privacy law
- Procedural law
- Property law
- Public health law
- Public International Law
- Real estate law
- Securities law / Capital markets law
- Space law
- Sports law
- Statutory law
- Tax law
- Technology law
- Tort law
- Trademark law
- Transport law / Transportation law
- Trusts & estates law
- Water law

== See also ==
- Law § Areas of law
- Outline of law § Branches of law
- List of legal topics
- List of legal terms
