= Chartered Institute of Legal Executives =

Professional body for Chartered Legal Executives in England and Wales

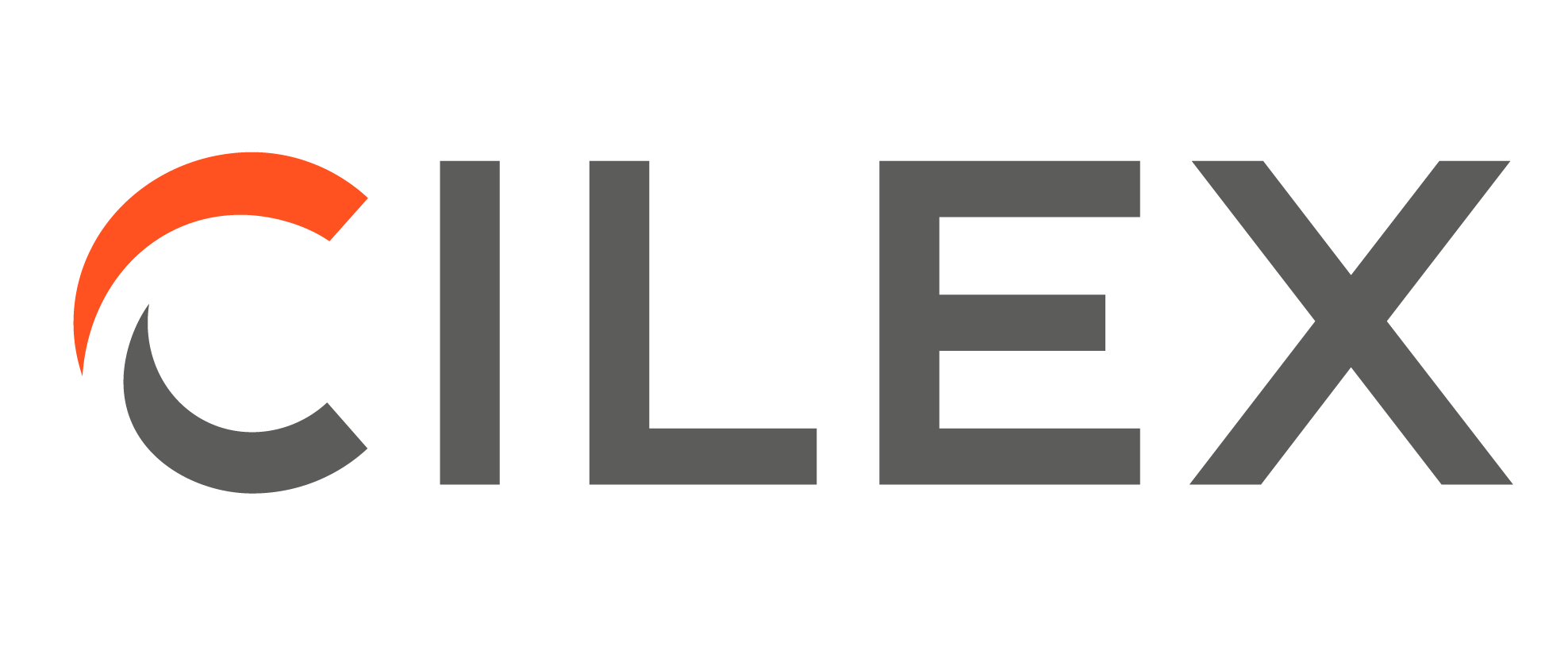
- Abbreviation: CILEX
- Formation: 1892
- Type: Professional body
- Legal status: Royal Charter 2012
- Region served: England and Wales
- Members: 17,000
- Official language: English
- President: Sara Fowler
- Main organ: Board
- Affiliations: Solicitors Regulation Authority
- Website: www.cilex.org.uk

The Chartered Institute of Legal Executives (CILEX) is the professional body for paralegals, CILEX lawyers and other specialist legal professionals in England and Wales.

== History ==
The original name of Institute of Legal Executives (ILEX) was established in 1963 with the help of the Law Society of England and Wales to provide a more formal process for training so-called "solicitors' clerks". Prior to that the Institute had various incarnations dating back to 1892. Charles Dickens was a solicitor's clerk (he drew on his experience for characters in his novels, and a solicitor's managing clerk is featured in John Galsworthy's 1910 play Justice).

Traditionally, a solicitor's clerk was not formally trained in law, but through experience had built up a working knowledge of specific aspects and could carry out legal paperwork as a fee earner. The creation of the Institute of Legal Executives meant that solicitors' clerks became qualified "legal executives" (holding a practising certificate and having a similar role to solicitors in practicing law). Legal Executive Lawyers gained rights that allow them to become partners in law firms, advocates with rights of audience in Court and judges.

== Royal charter status ==
On 13 October 2011 the Institute of Legal Executives (as a company limited by guarantee) sought royal charter status from Queen Elizabeth II via the Privy Council.

A royal charter was granted on 30 January 2012, and the Institute of Legal Executives became the Chartered Institute of Legal Executives, otherwise known as CILEX.

== Legal qualifications ==
The official legal education that CILEX provides as a route into the legal profession is the CILEX Professional Qualification (CPQ). It is designed to produce CILEX Lawyers, CILEX Advanced Paralegal and CILEX Paralegal.

== Membership ==
CILEX has more than 17,000 members, all eligible to use the appropriate designatory letters depending on their membership grade and demonstrating their commitment to professional and ethical standards in the legal profession.

== Continuing Professional Development ==
The CILEX Continuing Professional Development (CPD) is created to ensure that all CILEX-qualified professionals maintain and extend their knowledge and skills while improving their professional role and career. This is to continue following their professional and legal duties, plus their compliance required by CILEX Regulation.
