= Graduate Diploma in Law =

Legal qualification in England and Wales

The Graduate Diploma in Law/Postgraduate Diploma in Law/Common Professional Examination (GDL/PGDL/CPE) is a postgraduate law course in England and Wales that is taken by non-law graduates (graduates who have a degree in a discipline that is not law or not a qualifying law degree for legal practice) wishing to become either a solicitor or barrister in England and Wales. The course allows non-law students to convert to law after university (exceptions exist for non-graduates depending on circumstances); it is commonly known as a "law conversion course". Regulated by the Solicitors Regulation Authority, the course is designed as an intense programme covering roughly the same content as a law degree LLB (Hons) and the main goal is to allow people with a greater variety of educational backgrounds into the legal profession.

Most GDL/PGDL courses award a diploma and are thus often titled Common Professional Examination (CPE).

The GDL/PGDL is one (full-time) or two (part-time) years long, and successful candidates may proceed to the Bar Professional Training Course (BPTC) for barristers. It is regulated by the Law Society of England and Wales with admissions handled through the Central Applications Board. Prospective solicitors are no longer required to have either a Law degree or the GDL and may proceed direct to the Solicitors Qualifying Examination (SQE).

Some law students study for four years (rather than three years, usually due to a study year abroad or a placement year), making it possible for both non-law and law graduates of the same starting year to finish at the same time, with the CPE providing the "foundations of legal knowledge".

== UK course providers ==
In 1977, the former Inns of Court School of Law (now merged into City, University of London) launched their GDL/PGDL/CPE programme, which was the first of its kind in England and Wales.

The GDL/PGDL tends to be offered through private institutions or universities. The largest course providers are BPP Law School, City Law School and The University of Law.

The GDL/PGDL is also offered by several British universities including Cardiff University, the University of East Anglia, Keele University, the University of Sheffield, the University of Sussex, Swansea University, Birmingham City University, Manchester Metropolitan University, Leeds Beckett University, London Metropolitan University, the University of Westminster, Middlesex University, De Montfort University, University of East London, Nottingham Trent University and Oxford Brookes University.

== Typical structure ==
The typical structure of a GDL involves courses in:

- Foundations to Law or Law skills
- Public Law
- Contract Law
- Criminal Law
- Tort Law
- Equity & Trusts
- European Union Law
- Land Law
- Administrative Law
- Human Rights Law
