= Solicitor =

Legal practitioner dealing mainly with matters that do not require courtroom advocacy

A solicitor is a lawyer who traditionally deals with most of the legal matters in some jurisdictions. A person must have legally defined qualifications, which vary from one jurisdiction to another, to be described as a solicitor and enabled to practise there as such. For example, in England and Wales a solicitor is admitted to practise under the provisions of the Solicitors Act 1974. With some exceptions, practising solicitors must possess a practising certificate. There are many more solicitors than barristers in England; they undertake the general aspects of giving legal advice and conducting legal proceedings.

In the jurisdictions of England and Wales and in Northern Ireland, in the Australian states of New South Wales, Victoria, and Queensland, Hong Kong, South Africa (where they are called attorneys) and the Republic of Ireland, the legal profession is split between solicitors and barristers (called advocates in some countries, for example Scotland), and a lawyer will usually only hold one of the two titles. However, in Canada, Malaysia, New Zealand, Singapore and the remaining Australian states and territories, the legal profession is now for practical purposes "fused", allowing lawyers to hold the title of "barrister and solicitor" and practise as both. Some legal graduates will start off as one and then also qualify as the other. In the United States, the barrister–solicitor distinction never existed.

== Australia ==
Regulation of the profession in Australia varies from state to state. Admission to practise is state-based, although mutual recognition enables a practitioner admitted in any state or territory to practise in any other state or territory, or at the federal level. In all states and territories, solicitors have unlimited rights of audience and so can, at least in theory, practise as a solicitor, barrister or both. The formal names for admitted solicitors differs between jurisdictions. For example, in some jurisdictions, they are admitted as "legal practitioners", while in other jurisdictions they are admitted as "solicitors and barristers".

The extent to which the profession is "fused" in practice varies from state to state. In general, however, there is a separate bar with its own professional body composed of those practitioners who adopt the traditional barrister's model of practice, i.e. working in chambers and undertaking advocacy work. In some states, call to the bar requires different or additional training. A proportion of the other practitioners would practise as both solicitors and barristers, while still others would practise primarily or exclusively as solicitors. The relative sizes of the latter two categories differ from jurisdiction to jurisdiction.

== England and Wales ==
Before the creation of the Supreme Court of Judicature under the Supreme Court of Judicature Act 1873, solicitors practised in equity in the Court of Chancery, attorneys practised in the common law courts, and proctors practised in the "civil law" (based on Roman law) of the ecclesiastical courts. The monopoly of the proctors in family, inheritance and admiralty law had been removed in 1857–1859, and the 1873 reforms further fused all three branches of the profession. After 1873 the offices of "attorney" and "proctor" disappeared as terms relating to legally qualified persons, being replaced by "Solicitor of the Supreme Court of Judicature" (subsequently "of the Supreme Court of England and Wales"), except for the unique government offices of Queen's (or King's) Proctor (now called "HM Procurator-General", a title generally held by the Treasury Solicitor), and Attorney-General. Since the replacement of the judicial aspect of the House of Lords with a new Supreme Court of the United Kingdom (in 2009), separate from the existing Supreme Court of Judicature of England and Wales, the full title of a solicitor is "Solicitor of the Senior Courts of England and Wales".

The term "attorney" is however still used under English law to refer to someone legally appointed or empowered (who may but need not be legally qualified) to act for another person. Currently, the term is most commonly used to refer to someone so appointed under a "power of attorney". This may be a "general power of attorney" under section 10 of the Powers of Attorney Act 1971; a lasting power of attorney may be granted under the provisions of the Mental Capacity Act 2005. Some practitioners in specialist professions, notably intellectual property, are also referred to as attorneys, for example registered patent attorneys, which is a separate qualification from that of a solicitor.

=== Solicitors and barristers ===
In the English legal system, solicitors traditionally dealt with any legal matter, including conducting proceedings in courts, although solicitors were required to engage a barrister as advocate in a High Court or above after the profession split in two. Minor criminal cases are tried in magistrates' courts, which constitute by far the majority of courts. More serious criminal cases still start in the magistrates' court and may then be transferred to a higher court.

The majority of civil cases are tried in county courts and are almost always handled by solicitors. Cases of higher value (£100,000 or above) and those of unusual complexity are tried in the High Court, and barristers, as the other branch of the English legal profession, have traditionally carried out the functions of advocacy in the High Court, Crown Court and Court of Appeal.

In the past, barristers did not deal with the public directly. This rigid separation no longer applies. Solicitor advocates with extended rights of audience may now act as advocates at all levels of the courts. Conversely, the public may now hire and interact with a barrister directly in certain types of work without having to go to a solicitor first as a result of the Courts and Legal Services Act 1990 removing the monopoly of barristers to act as advocates and granting solicitors rights of audience in specified circumstances.

Solicitors now frequently appear in the lower courts and, subject to passing a test and thereby obtaining higher rights of audience, increasingly in the higher courts such as the High Court of Justice of England and Wales and the Court of Appeal. While the independent bar continued to exist in a largely unchanged state, a few firms of solicitors employed their own barristers and solicitor advocates to do some of their court work. The rules preventing barristers from being directly instructed were revised to allow direct instruction by certain organizations such as trade unions, accountants, and similar groups. Additionally, barristers who have completed the Bar Council's "Public Access" course can take instructions directly from members of the public under the Public Access Scheme.

Regulation of both barristers and solicitors was reviewed by David Clementi on behalf of the Ministry of Justice in 2004. He delivered his final recommendations in December 2004 which included proposals for a more unified regulatory system and new structures for cross-profession work. Many of his recommendations were enshrined in the Legal Services Act 2007.

The breakdown in the strict separation between barrister and solicitor was expected to go further following recognition by the Act of the so-called "Legal Disciplinary Practice" (LDP) (from 31 March 2009) and "Alternate Business Structure" (ABS) (from 6 October 2011) bodies, which allow more flexibly structured legal practices.

=== Regulatory scheme ===
Solicitors in England and Wales who wish to practise must pay an annual fee to obtain a practising certificate. This fee is paid to the Law Society of England and Wales, which represents the profession. The Solicitors Regulation Authority, though funded by these fees, acts independently of the Law Society. Together, the two bodies make up the complete system of professional regulation for solicitors. Complaints about solicitors, if not satisfactorily resolved by the solicitors' firm, may be made to the Legal Ombudsman.

=== Training and qualifications ===
The training and qualification required to enter the profession by being admitted as a solicitor is regulated by the Solicitors Regulation Authority (SRA). There are two graduate routes of entry into the profession. Prospective solicitors holding a qualifying law degree proceed to studying the Legal Practice Course. Those holding a non-law degree must in addition have completed a conversion course prior to enrolling on the Legal Practice Course. Once the Legal Practice Course has been completed, the prospective solicitor usually must then undertake two years' apprenticeship, known as a training contract, with a firm entitled to take trainee solicitors. The Legal Practice Course and training contract can also be undertaken simultaneously although this is less usual. The training contract was formerly known as articles of clerkship. The SRA completed an extensive review of qualification routes into law that has brought about the introduction of the Solicitor Qualifying Examination (SQE). The new route was introduced from 1 September 2021 with the first examinations to take place in November of the same year.

It is possible to qualify as a solicitor without having attended university by being admitted as a Fellow of the Chartered Institute of Legal Executives, and thereafter completing the required number of years of practical experience, and studying for the Legal Practice Course.

Although now on a downward trend, there is a large representation of lawyers in the UK with privately educated backgrounds. 37% of barristers and 21% of solicitors are from a private school background, compared to 7% of the overall UK population.

== Hong Kong ==
Hong Kong has maintained the distinction between solicitors, regulated by The Law Society of Hong Kong, and barristers, regulated by the Hong Kong Bar Association. A person intending to become a solicitor must have a professional law degree, either LL.B. or JD or the equivalent, and complete the one-year Postgraduate Certificate in Laws (P.C.LL.) course. They must also complete a two-year trainee solicitor contract with a law firm. All solicitors in Hong Kong are admitted to the High Court of Hong Kong and thus bear the full title of "Solicitor of the High Court of Hong Kong".

Solicitors enjoy rights of audience in the lower court and in chamber hearings in the High Court. For hearings in open court in the High Court and the Court of Final Appeal, only solicitors who have been certified as solicitor advocates may appear.

== Republic of Ireland ==
Solicitors in Ireland are represented and regulated by the Law Society of Ireland. It was formally established by Royal Charter in 1852. The legislative basis for its current role is set out in the Solicitors Acts 1954–2002.

In Ireland, it is quite possible to become a solicitor without holding a law degree; a few practising solicitors have no degree of any kind. Instead, individuals sit professional examinations which are set at degree level standard and undertake an intense apprenticeship programme.

The independence of most of Ireland in December 1922 as the Irish Free State was marked more by continuity with the British legal system than with change. The Free State later became a Republic in April 1949. The legal profession remained divided between barristers (or abhcóidí in Irish) and solicitors (or aturnaetha in Irish). There was some blurring of the distinction between their roles over the years. Notably, under Section 17 of the Courts Act 1971, solicitors were granted a right of audience in all courts, although in practice relatively few solicitors act as advocates for their clients in the Superior Courts.

== Japan ==
In Japan, attorneys at law (弁護士, bengoshi; lit. "advocate") form the principal branch of the legal profession. Bengoshi undertake either or both advocacy work and advice or transaction work typically performed by solicitors in common law jurisdictions.

Another branch of the legal profession, Shihō-shoshi (司法書士), are specialists in registration procedures for real estate and incorporation. With certification by the Ministry of Justice, they are also authorized to represent clients in civil suits filed in courts of summary jurisdiction (with claimed amount up to ¥1.4 million). Although there are some parallels with modern solicitors in common law countries, "shihō-shoshi" is officially translated as "judicial scrivener", reflecting the similarity of the role with the historical role of scriveners. In 2006, their professional body, Japan Federation of Shihō-shoshi Lawyer's Associations (日本司法書士会連合会), proposed that, in English, Shihō-shoshi be called "solicitor" and their organization "Japan Federation of Solicitor Associations", announcing that they would approach the government and other relevant parties to promote the use of the new translations. The government agencies, however, continue to use the traditional translation "judicial scrivener". Japan Federation of Shihō-shoshi Lawyer's Associations itself translates the profession as "solicitor" on its website.

== United States ==
=== Historical usage ===
Historically, solicitors existed in the United States and, consistent with the pre-1850s usage in England and elsewhere, the term referred to a lawyer who argued cases in a court of equity, as opposed to an attorney who appeared only in courts of law. With the chancery or equity courts disappearing or being subsumed under courts of law, by the late 19th century members of the fused profession were called "attorneys", with "solicitors" becoming obsolete.

=== Modern usage ===
In modern American usage, the term solicitor in the legal profession refers to government lawyers.

On the federal level, departmental solicitors remain in the Department of Labor, Department of the Interior, and the Patent & Trademark Office. The Solicitor General of the United States is the lawyer appointed to represent the federal government before the United States Supreme Court.

In various states, the title "solicitor" is still used by town, city and county lawyers. These states include Delaware, Georgia, Massachusetts, Maryland, New Hampshire, New Jersey, Ohio, Oklahoma, Pennsylvania, Rhode Island, South Carolina and West Virginia.

In South Carolina, criminal trials in the state's judicial circuits are overseen by a "circuit solicitor" whose role is analogous to that of district attorney in most other states.

In the Commonwealth of Massachusetts, the professional organization for government lawyers was formerly known as the City Solicitors and Town Counsel Association.

=== Common meaning of solicitor ===
In the US, "solicitor" is also used to describe a traveling salesman (with a pejorative connotation roughly equivalent to the British English word tout) as in the signed warning on public places of accommodation, "No Soliciting". Signs bearing the phrase "No Solicitors" may appear near entrances to private residences in the US. In addition to warding off salesmen, these signs are also used to deter proselytizing by religious groups such as Latter-day Saints and Jehovah's Witnesses with a history of door-to-door proselytizing in the US.

== See also ==
- Accredited specialist solicitor (Australia)
- Barrister
- Conveyancer
- Legal executive
- Licensed conveyancer
- Solicitor advocate
- Solicitor General
- Civil law notary, a similar position in the legal profession in civil law countries
