= Pupillage =

Vocational stage of training to become a barrister

A pupillage, in England and Wales and Northern Ireland is the final, vocational stage of training for those wishing to become practising barristers. Pupillage is similar to an apprenticeship, during which bar graduates build on what they have learnt during the Bar Course or equivalent by combining it with practical work experience in a set of barristers' chambers or pupillage training organisation.

== England and Wales ==
A pupillage is the final stage of training to be a barrister and usually lasts one year; in England and Wales the period is made up of two six-month periods (known as "sixes"). The first of these is the non-practising six, during which pupils shadow their pupil supervisor, and the second will be a practising six, when pupils can undertake to supply legal services and exercise rights of audience.

At the end of the first six months, a pupil needs to have the pupil supervisor sign a certificate confirming satisfactory completion and send it to the Bar Standards Board. The pupil receives a Provisional Qualification Certificate. At the end of the second six months, the pupil's supervisor must certify another document for satisfactory completion and send it to the Bar Standards Board pupillage records office. The pupil will then receive a Full Qualification Certificate.

=== Structure of pupillage ===
Pupillages are split into two different phases. The "first six" involves observing the pupil's supervisor at court and in conference, and assisting with related paperwork. In many chambers, this is the more relaxed part of the pupillage, as the pupil has little responsibility.

In the second six months of pupillage, each pupil is responsible for a personal case load. This will range from a first appearance in the County Court or a magistrates' court, hearings in the High Court, or Crown Court to full trials. Some second-six pupils may gain experience of jury trials, but this is rare. Generally, most second-six pupils handle minor proceedings such as case management conferences, plea and directions hearings, infant settlements or small claims cases, such as possession hearings, debt recovery proceedings or road traffic claims.

The amount of time that a pupil spends in court in the second six depends on the chambers. Second-six pupils in criminal sets are typically in court several times a week, while pupils in civil sets may only be in court two or three times in a week. Second-six pupils in commercial sets can go their entire pupillage without ever appearing in court.

In most leading criminal and civil sets, pupils receive a frequent supply of work. However, as clerks do not prioritise pupils, it may take some time before they are paid for their work. In some cases, pupils will never be paid for the work carried out in court. This has led to a situation where pupils struggle to make ends meet, especially in criminal sets.

=== Financial position of pupils ===
The financial position of pupils varies enormously. As of 1 January 2022, some pupil barristers will earn as little as £17,152 (Bar Council minimum) or £19,144 in London Chambers (the Bar Council minimum in London) for a 12-month pupillage. A pupil at a top commercial chambers can be paid £75,000.

Most pupillage awards are split into two halves: a "grant" in the first six months, which is paid monthly like a salary, and "guaranteed earnings" in the second six months. A pupil who earns less than the guaranteed earnings amount has their earnings topped up by chambers. If the pupil earns more than the guarantee, chambers will usually allow the pupil to keep all excess earnings, although these can be subject to deductions for clerking, chambers expenses and other sums. It can take several months for solicitors to pay pupils, which can cause financial hardship for some.

While pupils are allowed to supplement their incomes by undertaking part-time work outside of their pupillages, with the permission of their pupil master (supervisor) or Head of Chambers, the Bar Council requires pupils to apply themselves full-time to pupillage. Opportunities for earning outside of pupillage are limited by time constraints.

Pupillage is recognised as a difficult and demanding time. Pupils must attempt to impress as many members of their chambers as possible. They also have to impress their clerks by completing as many cases as possible and satisfying solicitors.

The Working Time Directive does not apply to most pupillages because most barristers are self-employed, and barristers' chambers are not companies or employers but a form of unincorporated association. However, the directive does apply to pupillages at the employed Bar, where pupils work in-house for an employer such as a public body, law firm, or other private company. For example, pupils can train to become a barrister with the Crown Prosecution Service or HM Revenue & Customs. Formally, under the directive, pupils may work a maximum of 48 hours per week, unless an opt-out has been signed.

=== Gaining pupillage ===
Prospective pupils can apply in advance for pupillages offered through Pupillage Gateway (a web-based application centre) usually about one year ahead of the proposed starting date. Non-Gateway chambers have their own application procedures, and details of how to contact all chambers with pupillages are advertised on the Pupillage Gateway website.

Gaining a pupillage is not easy. There is some evidence to suggest that every year around only 5–10% of applicants are successful. A candidate needs to demonstrate strong academic qualifications (preferably First Class Honours degree from a leading university, but normally an Upper Second at the very least) and excellent extracurricular activities. At the interview stage, candidates may be asked to perform advocacy exercises (such as mock court applications), and are tested on their ability to debate and think and answer questions on their feet.

== Hong Kong ==
Pupillage in Hong Kong generally lasts 12 months. The period may be shortened for those with advocacy experience in other jurisdictions or as a solicitor. A pupil barrister may be admitted after 6 months pupillage and then obtain a limited practising certificate that allows them to practise under the supervision of their pupil master.

There is no contractual relationship between pupil master and pupil in Hong Kong, and pupils are not as a general rule paid. However, the Hong Kong Bar Association encourages pupil masters to remunerate their pupils where the pupil has done work of value to them at any stage of their pupillage. Starting from 1 September 2019, pupil masters are required to pay an honorarium of HK$6,000 per month to their pupils.

There is no central system for obtaining pupils and prospective pupils must apply directly to chambers or to barristers.

== See also ==
- OLPAS
- Devilling, the Irish and Scottish systems
- Articling, the Canadian system
