= Bar Course =

Postgraduate course in England and Wales

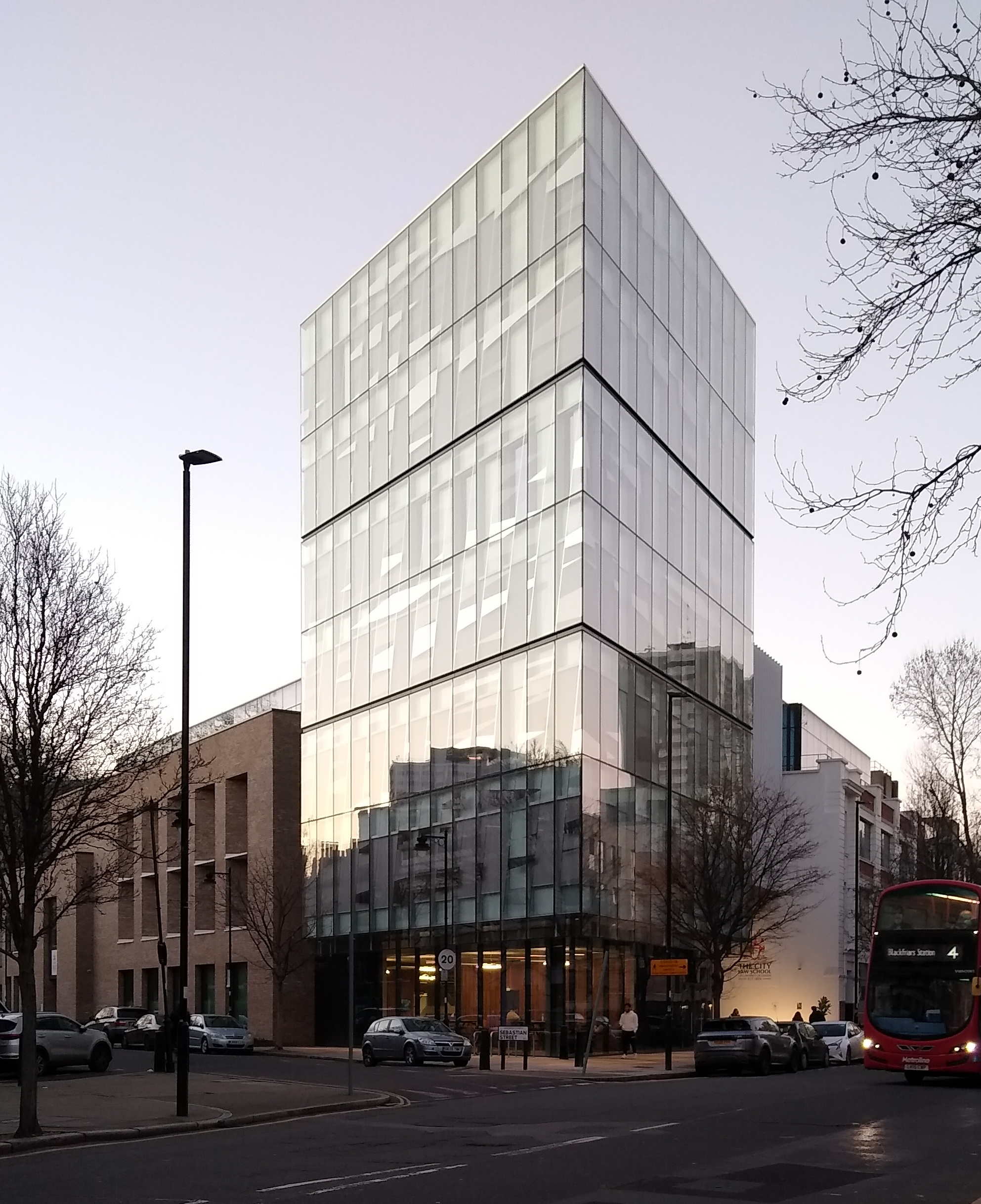
The City Law School, London. This is one of the 10 providers of the Bar Course.

The Bar Course is a postgraduate vocational course which allows graduates of law to study and train to be barristers in England and Wales. A total of ten institutions are authorised by the Bar Standards Board to run the Bar Course, and all students of the Bar Course are required to register with one of the four Inns of Court prior to enrolment. The Inns of Court are the only institutions authorised to call students to the Bar of England and Wales, whereby those who successfully complete the Bar Course are eligible to be named as barristers. The Bar Course was known until 2020 as the Bar Professional Training Course (BPTC), and before September 2010 was known as the Bar Vocational Course (BVC). Individual providers offer the Bar Course under different names, but their curricula remain substantively the same.

The Bar Course is the vocational component of Bar training, the second of the three-stage route to qualifying as a barrister in England and Wales. The first stage is the academic component, requiring the completion of either: a qualifying undergraduate law degree with at least lower second-class (2:2) honours; or a non-law degree with at least 2:2 honours and a Postgraduate Diploma in Law. The third stage, following successful completion of the Bar Course, is the work-based component completed by way of pupillage.

This vocational component of Bar training can be completed in four different ways, including:

- the three-step pathway (vocational component completed in one part in addition to the academic and pupillage components);
- four-step pathway (vocational component completed in two parts, in addition to the academic and pupillage components);
- integrated pathway (vocational and academic component combined, followed by pupillage); or
- a combination of the academic, vocational and pupillage components.

== Curriculum and previous entry requirements ==
=== Curriculum ===
The Bar Course consists of two examinations set centrally by the Bar Standards Board (BSB), in addition to vocational modules designed, set and marked by providers, with the passing mark set by the BSB. The centrally-set examinations are in Civil Litigation and Criminal Litigation, Evidence & Sentencing. The Civil Litigation examination consists of two multiple-choice question papers, which are closed-book and open-book respectively. The Criminal Litigation examination consists of a single, closed-book multiple-choice question paper. The pass mark for the BSB centrally-set exams is determined by way of standard-setting.

The vocational modules are listed as follows:

- Advocacy
- Drafting
- Opinion Writing
- Legal Research
- Conference Skills
- Professional Ethics

Save for Legal Research and Professional Ethics, which are both marked on a pass/fail basis, the vocational modules have a pass mark set at 60%.

=== Previous entry requirements ===
In addition to passing the Bar Course Aptitude Test (BCAT), the minimum entry requirements for the BPTC was a qualifying undergraduate degree in law with no less than lower second-class (2:2) honours or a non-law academic degree with lower second-class (2:2) honours alongside the Graduate Diploma in Law. Additionally students from outside English speaking countries were required to demonstrate their oral and written English language ability was at least equivalent to a minimum score of 7.5 in each section of the IELTS academic test or a minimum score of 73 in each part of the Pearson Test of English (academic). On 31 July 2022, the BCAT was abolished.

== Qualification ==
Upon successful completion of the Bar Course and completing at least 10 Qualifying Sessions with their Inn of Court, students are eligible to be Called to the Bar. Each Inn of Court offers its own programme of Qualifying Sessions, which include but are not limited to lectures, advocacy training events and formal dinners. After being Called to the Bar, successful graduates of the Bar Course who have not yet completed pupillage are known as unregistered barristers.

Following Call, unregistered barristers have five years to gain pupillage. Those undergoing pupillage are known as pupil barristers; after successful completion of pupillage, they are able to practice as barristers.

== Criticisms ==
=== BPTC (2010-2020) ===
In April 2015, Chair of the Bar Council Alastair Macdonald raised concerns about the financial risk involved in taking the BPTC, claiming that "There are too many people spending too much money in order to train [...] with no realistic prospect of being able to make a start in the profession". In the same month, a report commissioned by the Bar Council heavily criticised BPTC providers. The report suggested that course providers were "using the system to make money from people with no realistic prospect of pupillage", and claimed that the course was "not highly regarded by practitioners." The report suggested increasing standards for the course, and introducing a new test to replace the BCAT, which then had a 98% pass rate, though there were plans to increase the pass mark. Jeremy Robson, a senior lecturer at Nottingham Law School, denied these claims. He noted that all prospective students receive a health warning noting the low number of pupillages compared to course places, and that the practitioners consulted in the working group were "drawn from a small section of the profession."

=== Bar Course (2020 onwards) ===
Since the abolition of the BPTC, the Bar Course has continued to face criticism for its affordability. Although course fees saw an average drop by around £4,700 in 2023, 78% of 483 Bar students on the three-step pathway found the Bar Course either "fairly" or "very" unaffordable after reforms made to the Bar Course. However, those studying on the four-step pathway or studying part-time were less likely to find the Bar Course unaffordable. Furthermore, a 2024 report by the Law Society Gazette, noted that "Bar course uptake continues to grow despite an increase in the cost of vocational training courses and a fall in the overall pass rate". The cost of course fees for UK students for 2023/24 entry was between £11,970 to £18,950, rising to £22,700 for overseas students. For 2024/25 entrants, the range for UK students was between £12,300 and £18,950, rising to £22,700 for overseas students.

In light of criticisms by "key stakeholders" about lowering standards of Bar training, the Bar Standards Board responded by stating, "it is not the BSB's role to limit ambition and demand, provided that prospective students are well-informed about their prospects", adding that “The Legal Services Board’s statutory guidance on education and training requires that regulators place no inappropriate direct or indirect restrictions on the numbers entering the profession."

== Current providers ==
The following table is a list of current providers of the Bar Course, accepting applications for the 2026/27 academic year. Unless otherwise stated, the course fees indicated are for the Bar Course only, and not those courses with additional components such as LLMs or additional modules.

Current providers of the Bar Course
Institution	Location	Course title	Course fees (2026/27 academic year)	Website
BPP Law School	London	Bar Training Course (BTC)	£18,750 (Domestic) £20,150 (International)	BPP
BPP Law School	Leeds, Manchester, Birmingham, Bristol, Cardiff	BTC	£17,450 (Domestic) £18,750 (International)	BPP
Cardiff University	Cardiff	Bar Training Course (BTC)	£19,950 (Domestic) £24,700 (International)	Cardiff
The City Law School	London	Bar Vocational Studies (BVS)	£18,260 (Domestic and International)	City St George's
Manchester Metropolitan University	Manchester	Bar Training Course (BTC)	£16,000 (Domestic and International)	MMU
The Inns of Court College of Advocacy	London	ICCA Bar Course	£16,600 (Domestic and International)	ICCA
Northumbria University	Newcastle upon Tyne	Bar Professional Training Course (BPTC)	£15,500 (Domestic and International)	Northumbria
Nottingham Trent University	Nottingham	Barristers Training Course (BTC)	£13,550 (Domestic and International)	Nottingham
The University of Law	London	Bar Practice Course (BPC)	£18,100	ULaw
The University of Law	Birmingham, Bristol, Leeds, Liverpool, Manchester, Newcastle, Nottingham	Bar Practice Course (BPC)	£16,450	ULaw
University of the West of England	Bristol	Bar Training Course (BTC)	£13,750 (Domestic) £14,500 (International)	UWE
University of Hertfordshire	Hatfield	LLM Bar Practice	£17,950 (Domestic) £19,950 (International)	Herts

== See also ==
- Law Society of England and Wales
- Bar Council
- Barrister
- Inns of Court
- List of areas of law
