= BPP Holdings =

British holding company

BPP Holdings Limited
- Company type: Private
- Industry: Education
- Founded: 1976; 50 years ago
- Headquarters: London, England, UK
- Key people: Graham Gaddes (CEO)
- Owner: TDR Capital
- Divisions: BPP Learning Media; BPP Professional Education; BPP University
- Website: bpp.com

BPP Holdings Limited is a holding company of the United Kingdom-based provider of professional and academic education. BPP Holdings incorporates distinct legal entities including BPP University, BPP Professional Education and BPP Actuary. It was a subsidiary of the American for-profit higher education company Apollo Global since July 2009, having formerly been listed on the London Stock Exchange and a constituent of the FTSE 250 Index, before being purchased by TDR Capital in March 2021.

== History ==
The company was founded by Alan Brierley, Richard Price and Charles Prior in 1976 as Brierley Price Prior to provide training to accountancy students. It was first listed on the London Stock Exchange in 1987. Also in 1987 the company acquired Mander Portman Woodward, a provider of Fifth and Sixth Form teaching. Then in 1992 the company established BPP Law School which in 2005 became a founding School of BPP College of Professional Studies, which provides legal as well as business management training. In 2007 the Privy Council awarded BPP College powers to award degrees.

On 30 July 2009, American private education company Apollo Group acquired BPP in a deal worth approximately $607 million, funded by an intercompany loan of approximately $104 million from Apollo Group to Apollo Global, $375 million in capital contributions from Apollo Group and $55 million in capital contributions from Apollo Global's minority shareholder, the Carlyle Group.

In July 2010 BPP College was awarded University college status. In August 2013, BPP University College was granted full university status and now is known as BPP University. BPP was granted degree-awarding powers for an indefinite time period in 2020.

In December 2020, several media outlets, including The Lawyer and Legal Cheek, reported that BPP's Public Relations team had been warned by Wikipedia for “disruptive editing” practices on the page for the BPP Holdings-owned BPP University, and ended up being “banned indefinitely” from editing the online encyclopaedia. Whilst stating that the edits were “minor”, a BPP spokesperson said the company will henceforth “follow Wikipedia’s guidance” for editing. A spokesperson for BPP's PR agency Gerard Kelly & Partners (GKP), which was on the receiving end of the ban, issued a statement stating that the BPP PR team will henceforth follow guidelines on editing “as advised by Wikipedia.”

In June 2019, Times Higher Education reported that BPP owners, the Apollo Education Group, were looking to sell the university just two years after ownership changed hands in 2017.

The company was acquired by TDR Capital in March 2021.

In November 2021 BPP acquired Estio Training, and, in June 2022, it bought Firebrand Training. In February 2023, BPP went on to acquire the Digital Marketing Institute, and, in April 2024, it acquired Buttercups Training.

== Notable alumni ==
- Kenny Imafidon, author and journalist
