= Martyn Jones (disambiguation) =

Martyn Jones is a British Labour Party politician.

Martyn Jones may also refer to:

- Martyn Jones (painter) (born 1955), British painter
- Professor Martyn W Jones, British academic, Chancellor of BPP University and Director General of UCFB.
- Martyn Jones, member of The Mermen rock band

== See also ==
- Martyn Lloyd-Jones (1899–1981), Welsh Protestant minister
- Martin Jones (disambiguation)
