= Litigation and controversies of the University of Phoenix =

American for-profit university

The University of Phoenix is a private for-profit university headquartered in Phoenix, Arizona, founded in 1976. Into the 2000s, the school has been the subject of lawsuits and controversies related to its operations and government affiliations.

== History by ownership ==
=== Founding, Apollo Group ===
The University of Phoenix was founded in 1976 by John Sperling and John D. Murphy. In 1994, UoPX leaders made the parent company, Apollo Group, public.

==== Events (1976-2015) ====
In 2000, the federal government fined the university $6 million for including study-group meetings as instructional hours.

A 2003 lawsuit filed by two former university recruiters alleged that the school improperly obtained hundreds of millions of dollars in financial aid by paying its admission counselors based on the number of students they enrolled, a violation of the Higher Education Act. The university's parent company settled by paying the government $67.5 million, plus $11 million in legal fees, without admitting any wrongdoing.

In 2004, the Department of Education alleged that UoPX violated Higher Education Act provisions that prohibit financial incentives to admission representatives, and pressured its recruiters to enroll students. UoPX disputed the findings but paid a $9.8 million fine as part of a settlement where it admitted no wrongdoing and was not required to return any financial aid funds. The university also paid $3.5 million to the Department of Labor to settle a violation of overtime compensation regarding hours worked by UoPX's recruiters. UoPX settled a false claims suit for $78.5 million in 2009 over its recruiter-pay practices.

In 2009, the Department of Education produced a report claiming the untimely return of unearned Title IV funds for more than 10 percent of sampled students. The report also expressed concern that some students register and begin attending classes before completely understanding the implications of enrollment, including their eligibility for student financial aid. In January 2010, the parent company Apollo Group was required to post a letter of credit for $125 million by January 30 of the same year. In 2010, UoPX came under government scrutiny after its Phoenix and Philadelphia campuses were found to have engaged in deceptive enrollment practices and fraudulent solicitation of FAFSA funds.

In August 2010, an ABC News investigation identified a UoPX recruiter who sought new students from Y-Haven, a homeless shelter in Cleveland, Ohio. Another University of Phoenix recruiter falsely claimed to an undercover television producer taking part in an investigation of the school that the university's Bachelor of Science in Education degree would be sufficient to qualify them to teach in Texas or New York.

In 2014 the Department of Education's Office of the Inspector General demanded records from the school and Apollo Group going back to 2007 "related to marketing, recruitment, enrollment, financial aid, fraud prevention, [and] student retention". In the same year, Arthur Green, a former UoPX enrollment advisor, sued the school and claimed that it had violated the US False Claims Act. According to Green, he was fired for uncovering billions of dollars in fraud. Five years later, the case was dismissed in 2019 after the US Department of Justice under William Barr decided not to take the case and the records were sealed.

In October 2015, the Department of Defense suspended the school's ability to recruit on U.S. military bases and receive federal funding for educating members of the U.S. military. After protest from senators John McCain, Jeff Flake, and Lamar Alexander, the suspension was lifted in January 2016.

The Federal Trade Commission (FTC) began investigating the university in 2015 in regard to an advertising campaign it ran from 2012 to 2014. On December 10, 2019, UoPX agreed to pay a settlement of $191 million related to charges that it recruited students using misleading advertisements. NPR reported the amount included $50 million in cash (which was later distributed as checks to more than 100,000 former students), as well as a $141 million cancellation in student debt, though the cancellations "won't affect student borrowers' obligations for federal or private loans". The institution admitted no wrongdoing as part of the settlement, which was at the time the largest FTC settlement against a for-profit school.

=== Private investment group ===
In February 2016, Apollo Group announced its sale to a private investment group comprising Apollo Global Management, the Vistria Group, and the Najafi Companies, for $1 billion.

==== Events (2016-2025) ====
In 2019, a class action lawsuit was filed by over 200,000 student borrowers due to allegations of fraud. The University of Phoenix was among 153 institutions named in the case. The lawsuit was supported by the Project on Predatory Student Lending, part of the Legal Services Center at Harvard Law School. A settlement was approved in August 2022, stating that the schools on the list were included because of "substantial misconduct, whether credibly alleged or in some instances proven." In April 2023, the Supreme Court rejected a challenge to the settlement and allowed the debt cancellation to proceed.

In March 2020, the U.S. Department of Veterans Affairs (VA) announced that they had suspended certification for G.I. Bill funds for new students at UoPX, citing a history of deceptive recruiting practices. The VA withdrew its threat of sanctions in July 2020.

In April 2024, the University of Phoenix and California Attorney General Rob Bonta resolved an investigation into UoPX's use of military student recruitment tactics from 2012 through 2015 via settlement, where the university agreed to pay out $4.5 million in penalties and other fees.

=== Phoenix Education Partners ===
On August 29, 2025, AP VIII Queso Holdings LP, the new parent company of the University of Phoenix, filed for an initial public offering. The company announced that its name would change to Phoenix Education Partners Inc. before the closing of the offering.

==== Events (2025-present) ====
In November 2025, the University of Phoenix (UoPX) became one of several U.S. universities, including Harvard University and the University of Pennsylvania, affected by a data theft campaign linked to the Clop ransomware group. Attackers used a zero-day vulnerability in Oracle E-Business Suite software to steal information from students, staff, and suppliers. The university disclosed the data breach on its website and in its 8-K filing.
