= Meritus University =

For-profit university in New Brunswick, Canada

- Type: Private
- Established: 2008
- Affiliations: University of Phoenix, Apollo Group
- President: Dr. John Crossley
- Location: Fredericton, NB, Canada
- Campus: Urban
- Colours: black & red ;
- Website: http://www.meritusu.ca

Meritus University is the Canadian brand name of a for-profit university owned and operated by the Apollo Group in the United States, the owners of the University of Phoenix. The offices of the company were located in New Brunswick, Canada. On January 24, 2011, citing how "enrollment will continue to be insufficient to sustain the required quality academic and student service infrastructure we and our students demand", Meritus University announced its closure, with their last classes taking place on March 14, 2011.

== Programs ==
Meritus University offers undergraduate degree and Masters degree programs.

=== School of Business ===
- Bachelor of Business Administration (BBA) degree program with specializations in Communications, Finance, Global Management, Hospitality Management, Human Resources Management, Integrated Supply Chain Management, Management, and Marketing.
- Master of Business Administration (MBA) degree program with specializations in Global Management, Health Care Management, Human Resources Management, Information and Communications Technology Management, and Marketing.

=== School of Information Technology ===
- Bachelor of Information Technology Management (BITM) degree program with specializations in Communication and Information Management, Digital Media Management, and Human Interface and Systems Management.

== Degree granting status ==
Meritus University’s degree programs are recognized by the New Brunswick Department of Post-Secondary Education, Training and Labour.

== Scholarships ==
The University joined Project Hero, a scholarship program cofounded by Rick Hillier for the families of fallen Canadian Forces members.

== See also ==
- Higher education in New Brunswick
