= Ana Vilhete =

Serial entrepreneur, TV personality and lawyer

- Born: Ana Vilhete; 5 March 1987 (age 39); Luanda, Angola
- Education: LLB in Law & Criminology, LPC and MBA
- Alma mater: University of South Bank, BPP Law School, University of Warwick.
- Occupations: Serial entrepreneur, TV personality & Lawyer.
- Known for: Founder of Alium Consultancy & Themis Crown Advocates
- Website: www.anavilhete.com

Ana Vilhete (born 5 March 1987) is a UK-based serial entrepreneur, TV personality and lawyer. She is a contributor on ITV's Good Morning Britain programme.

== Early life and education ==
Born in Luanda, Angola during the Angolan Civil War, Vilhete migrated to Portugal at a very tender age and later to the UK. She holds an LLB in Law and Criminology from the University of South Bank. She did a Legal Practice Course from BPP Law School and an MBA at the University of Warwick.

== Career ==
Vilhete contributes on ITV's Good Morning Britain. She has featured on BBC and London Live as a guest speaker.

In 2020, Vilhete founded Alium Consultancy, a Healthcare and IT staffing service based in the United Kingdom. In 2024, she established her law firm, Themis Crown Advocates in the UK.

Vilhete is a regular speaker across UK universities. She is also an investor and a non-executive director of SMEs in the United Kingdom.
