= Carl Lygo =

British barrister and academic (born 1967)

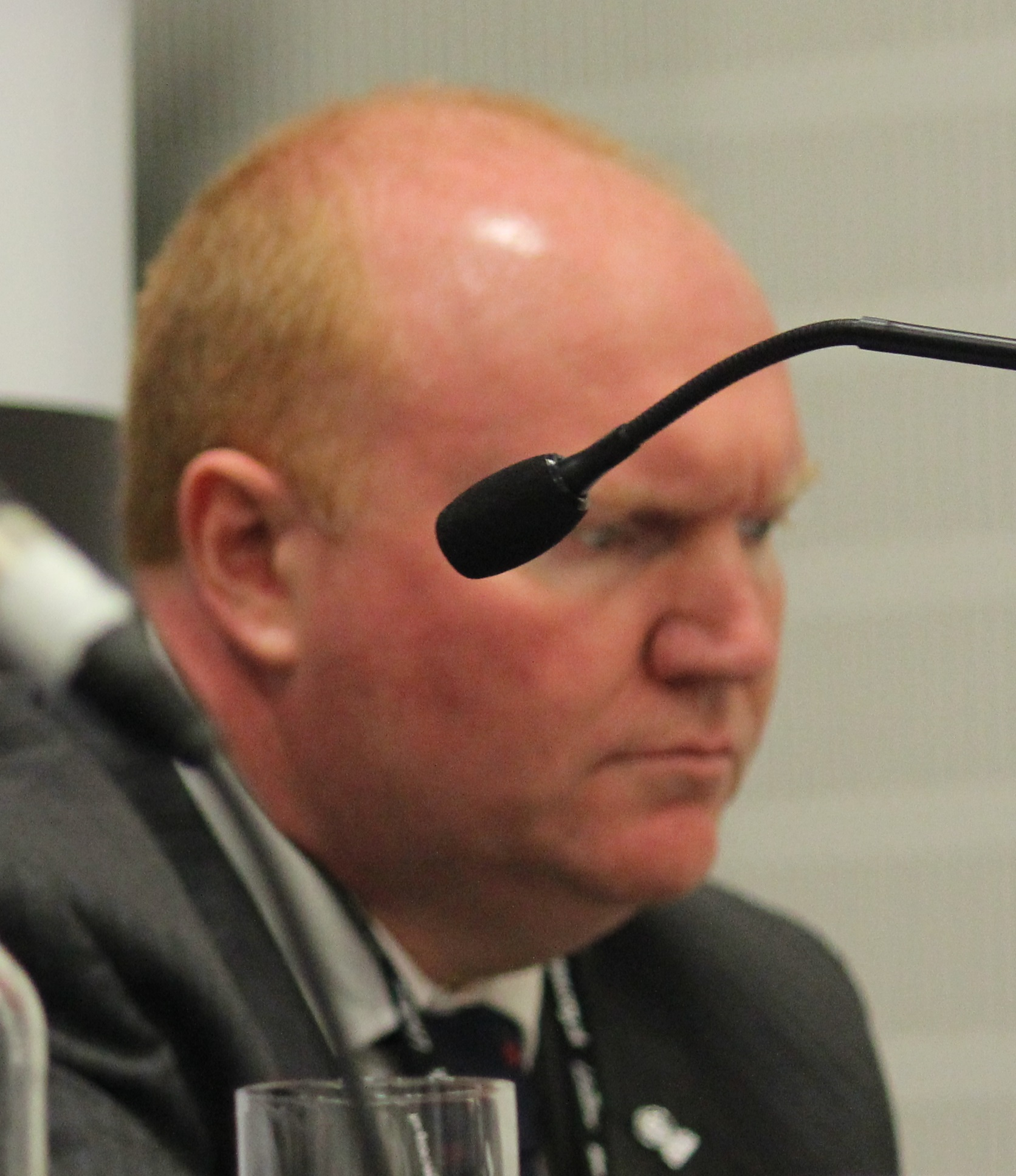

Vice-Chancellor and CEO of Arden University
- In office April 2019 – January 2027
- Preceded by: Professor Philip Hallam

Personal details
- Born: October 1967 (age 58–59) Doncaster, England
- Education: University of Central Lancashire; University of East Anglia; University of Michigan; Henley Management College; Inns of Court School of Law; London Guildhall University

Carl Raymond Lygo (born October 1967) is a British barrister and academic who was the founding vice-chancellor of BPP University. Since 2018 he has been the Chairman of University of Europe for Applied Sciences in Germany and since 2019 the Vice-Chancellor of Arden University in the UK. He is the founding chairman of the Association of Cost Lawyers Training, the founding chairman of Turner Schools a multi academy trust charity set up to help disadvantaged children in Folkestone, Kent, a non-executive director of UCFB (an innovative Football Higher Education Institution), an advisory board member of WONKHE for Higher Education.

== Career ==
He lectured in criminal law at the University of East Anglia, Banking Law at the City University London, Tort Law at the University of Leeds & Leeds Metropolitan University and became a senior lecturer at London Guildhall University before joining BPP Law School in 1996. He helped to establish the first Bar Vocational Course at BPP Law School, becoming the leader of the Legal Practice Course leading the team that created the innovative "City LPC" for "magic circle" law firms in 2000, which propelled BPP Law School from an intake of less than 100 students to over 3,000 opening new centres in Leeds, Manchester. He became director of the publicly listed company, BPP Holdings Limited and chairman of BPP Law School. In 2005 he was included in The Lawyer list of Hot 100 Lawyers in the UK. In 2005 he launched BPP College, creating BPP Business School and becoming the founding principal. In 2006 he was granted a professorship in English Common Law. In 2007 BPP College was granted Taught Degree Awarding Powers by the UK Privy Council, a move which was estimated to add between £50 and 100 million to the stock value of BPP Holdings Limited lifting BPP into the FTSE 250 list of Companies. In 2009 BPP College was acquired by the Apollo Education Group. In 2010 BPP College was granted the title of BPP University College and later launched a School of Health Studies and a School of Foundation & English Language Studies. In 2013 BPP was granted full University title following a successful review by the QAA and HEFCE. In December 2013 BPP University was voted best Higher Education Provider in the UK.

He has served as CEO of BPP Holdings from 2009 to 2017, having joined BPP in 1996, and was installed as Vice-Chancellor of BPP University in 2013 serving until his departure in March 2017 following the acquisition of BPP by a US Private Equity Group.
