= Peduto =

Peduto is a surname. Notable people with the surname include:

- Bill Peduto (born 1964), American politician
- Ralph Peduto (1942–2014), American actor, playwright, writer and director
