= Temilolu Seun Ashamu =

Nigerian lawyer and politician

Temilolu Nurudeen Seun Ashamu is a Nigerian lawyer and politician who serves as the Commissioner for Environment and Natural Resources in Oyo State.

== Education ==
Ashamu received his early education at Eltham College in the United Kingdom (UK). He later studied Law at the University of Kent, UK, where he earned an LL.B. (Hons.) degree, followed by a Master of Laws (LL.M.) from University College London (UCL), University of London. He completed his legal training with exposure to both the UK and Nigerian legal systems through studies at BPP Law School, UK, and the Nigerian Law School.

== Career ==
In legal practice, his work has centred on arbitration, foreign investment structuring, and advisory roles in sectors such as energy, mining, corporate finance, taxation, and real estate. He was a member of the legal team at the commercial law firm Babalakin & Co.

His entry into public service began with his appointment by Oyo State governor Seyi Makinde as the Honourable Commissioner for Energy & Mineral Resources. In 2025, he was reassigned to the portfolio of Commissioner for Environment and Natural Resources.

== Recognition ==
Ashamu has been recognised as an Ambassador of Kent Law School, and he has also received the Duke of Edinburgh Award for his participation in leadership and community‑oriented activities.
