= Arden University =

British private for-profit university

- Former name: Resource Development International
- Motto: Learning without Boundaries
- Type: for-profit university
- Established: 1990
- Affiliations: ACU
- Location: Coventry, England, UK; 52.3696°N 1.4679°W
- Owner: Global University Systems
- Vice-Chancellor/CEO: Carl Lygo
- Website: arden.ac.uk

Arden University is a publicly-funded,for-profit teaching university in the United Kingdom. It offers a variety of undergraduate and postgraduate programmes with both blended and online distance learning delivery options. Its head office is in Coventry with campus locations in Birmingham, Manchester, Leeds, London, Newcastle, Nottingham and Berlin. Originally established as Resource Development International (RDI) in 1990, it was later bought by Capella Education and awarded university status by the British government in 2015. Since August 2016, it has been owned by Global University Systems. It is named after the Arden area of England, where its Coventry headquarters are situated.

== History ==
Resource Development International (RDI), the forerunner of Arden University, was established in 1990 by the Coventry-based entrepreneur John Holden. RDI originally provided distance learning programmes for commercial and industrial clients and established several subsidiary operations in the US, Europe, Africa, and the Far East. By 2010, it had closed most of its foreign subsidiaries and had expanded to include distance learning degrees validated by several UK universities. Its motto was "Learning without Boundaries". In 2011, Holden sold RDI and its remaining subsidiaries to the US-based Capella Education and went on to develop an online business school based in Coventry.

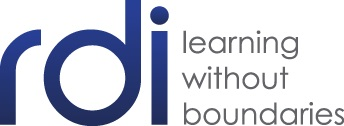
RDI's logo in 2015

RDI was granted taught degree awarding powers in April 2014 and the following year was awarded university status. It relaunched as Arden University in August 2015 with Philip Hallam, formerly the CEO of RDI, as its founding Vice-Chancellor and CEO. Arden was the first distance learning university to launch in the UK since the founding of the Open University in 1969 and the third of three for-profit universities created under the Conservative government's drive to increase competition in the UK university sector. The previous two were the University of Law in 2012 and BPP University in 2013.

Capella Education had originally bought RDI as part of its strategy to accelerate the company's expansion into the international market. However, the strategy did not come to fruition, and Capella put Arden University and its remaining subsidiaries up for sale in February 2016. Sunderland University, which validated some of RDI's degrees bought the Resource Development International Hong Kong subsidiary from Arden University in July 2016. In August of that year, Arden University itself was sold to the Netherlands-based company Global University Systems (GUS) for £15 million. GUS's other UK holdings include the University of Law, St Patrick's College, London and the London School of Business and Finance.

From January 2016, the previous externally validated degree programmes under RDI were gradually phased out and replaced by Arden's own degree programmes. In November 2017, Arden University had an enrollment of 5,700 students, of whom 2,500 were enrolled in the university's own programmes. Approximately 44% of its students were based outside the UK. In 2019 Carl Lygo succeeded Philip Hallam as Vice-Chancellor and CEO of the university.

In July 2024 the Office for Students issued their Regulatory case report for Arden University Limited: Ongoing condition B3 investigation outcome. This stated that “ the Office for Students (OfS) has found Arden University Limited (‘the provider’) at increased risk of a future breach of ongoing condition of registration B3 (student outcomes) for five of the indicators investigated.”

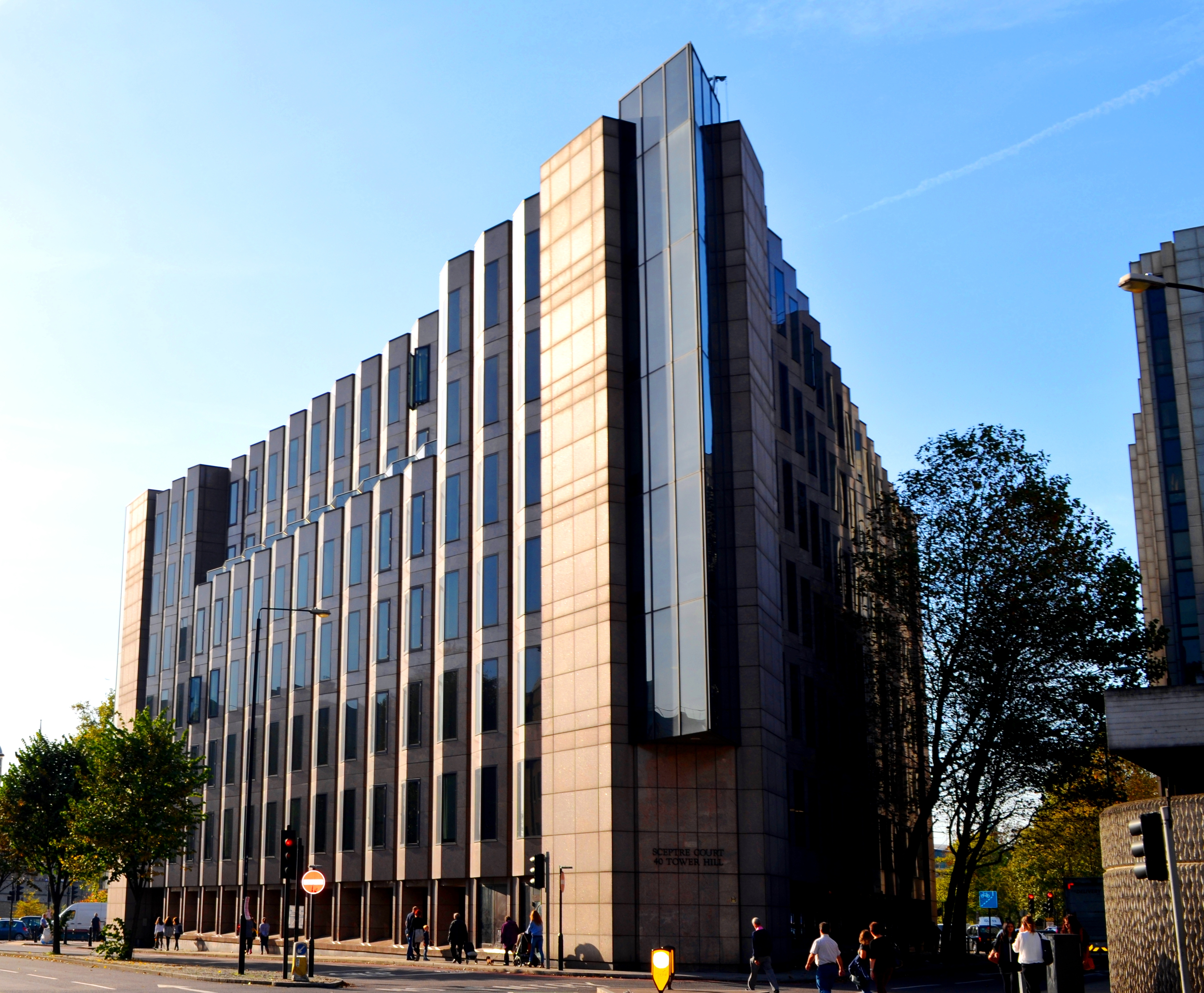
Sceptre Court, the site of Arden's Tower Hill campus

== Programmes ==
The university offers both undergraduate and postgraduate degree programmes up to Masters and MBA level in a variety of subjects. As of 2019, these include business and management, computing and IT, criminology, data analytics, finance, graphic design, health and social care, human resource management, law, marketing, psychology, and tourism.

Several of Arden's degree courses have additional accreditation by professional bodies, including the Chartered Institute of Marketing, Chartered Management Institute, British Psychological Society, and Association for Project Management. Arden University is also a member of the Association to Advance Collegiate Schools of Business.

Arden University's courses can be studied both full-time and part-time and are delivered either as distance learning and entirely online or as blended learning which combines online and face-to-face class tuition at one of its study campuses. The university has UK campus locations in Birmingham, Leeds, Manchester and Nottingham, as well as three in London at Ealing, Tower Hill, and Holborn. Arden also delivers and awards several undergraduate and postgraduate degrees in Berlin on the campus of University of Applied Sciences Europe.

== See also ==
- List of universities in the United Kingdom
- Global Banking School
- BPP University
