= CIS London & Partners =

UK Law firm

CIS London & Partners LLP
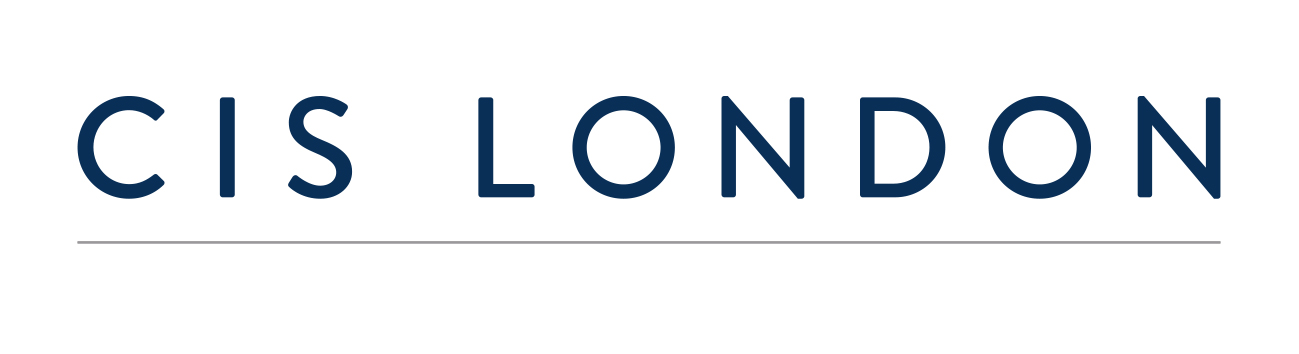
- Headquarters: London, WC1; United Kingdom
- No. of offices: 1
- No. of lawyers: 10+
- Major practice areas: General Practice
- Date founded: 2007
- Founder: Svetlana London
- Company type: Limited liability partnership
- Website: www.cislondon.com

CIS London & Partners LLP is a London-based foreign law firm.

== Practice areas ==
The firm advises businesses and individuals in relation to the CIS countries.

CIS London provides legal advice on M&A, joint ventures, and other cross-border transactions and international projects involving the CIS countries. The firm also handles multi-jurisdictional disputes and advises on compliance and regulatory issues. The firm's areas of expertise include corporate and commercial, dispute resolution, financial services, and taxation.

== BPP University satellite ==
In 2016 CIS London & Partners partnered with BPP University to offer its MBA (Legal Services) programme in Russia and the Commonwealth of Independent States (CIS). Svetlana London is an alumnus of BPP.

== Notability ==
Lawyers of the firm are regular contributors to the Getting the Deal Through series of annual reports, in volumes such as Fintech, Copyright, Trademarks and Right of Publicity.

The Legal 500 UK Awards recognises CIS London as a Tier 1 Foreign Law Firm in London for EMEA (Russia). The firm's founder and managing partner, Svetlana London, is also ranked by Chambers and Partners in The High Net Worth Guide and by The Spear's 500 as the Recommended Corporate Lawyer.

The firm is a London living wage employer.
