= Murder of Brooke Hart and the lynching of Thomas Harold Thurmond and John M. Holmes =

Kidnapping and murder victim in California (1911–1933)

Brooke Hart
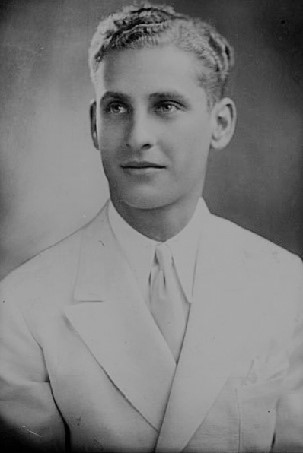
- Hart. c. 1933
- Born: Brooke Leopold Hart; June 11, 1911
- Died: November 9, 1933 (aged 22)
- Education: Bellarmine College Preparatory; Santa Clara University (BS)
- Occupation: Businessman
- Known for: Kidnapping and murder victim; Public lynching of his alleged murderers
- Father: Alexander Hart

Brooke Leopold Hart (June 11, 1911 – November 9, 1933) was the eldest son of Alexander Hart, the owner of the L. Hart & Son department store in downtown San Jose, California, United States. His kidnapping and murder were heavily publicized, and the subsequent lynching of his alleged murderers, Thomas Harold Thurmond and John M. Holmes, both white men, sparked widespread political debate.

The overnight lynchings of November 26–27 were carried out by a mob of San Jose citizens in St. James Park across from the Santa Clara County Jail, and were broadcast as a "live" event by a Los Angeles radio station. The killings were tacitly endorsed by Governor James Rolph Jr., who said he would pardon anyone convicted of the lynching. Scores of reporters, photographers, and newsreel camera operators, along with an estimated 3,000 to 10,000 men, women, and children, were witnesses to it. When newspapers published photos, identifiable faces were deliberately smudged so that they would remain anonymous; the following Monday, local newspapers published 1.2 million copies, twice the normal daily production.

== Background ==
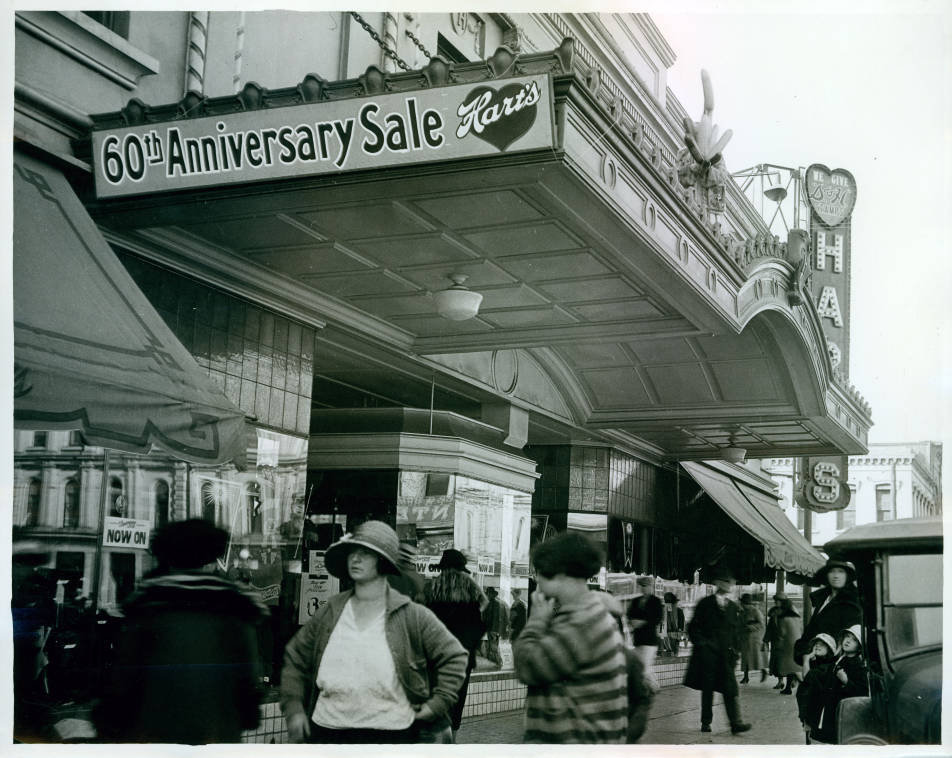
Harts Department Store, San Jose, California 1926

In 1933, 22-year-old Brooke Hart was the heir to one of San Jose, California's best-known businesses, the L. Hart & Son department store, located at the southeast corner of Market and Santa Clara streets. Brooke's grandfather and the store's namesake, Leopold Hart, was an Alsatian immigrant who bought a mercantile shop known as the Cash Corner store in 1866. After Leopold's son, Alex J. Hart Sr. (known as A.J.) took over the business, it expanded to the landmark status it held in San Jose for four decades – becoming as much a part of the fabric of the city as Macy's was in New York City or Neiman Marcus was in Dallas.

The Hart store was famous for its attentive customer service, and benefited from the deep loyalty of customers and employees alike. When the country found itself in the grip of the Great Depression, Hart's held on to its central place in the lives of San Jose's citizens, and continued to buy advertising in local publications. The Hart family was one of the city's most prominent, and their influence was the source of many colorful stories: one such tale recounts that the artist, Fr. Luigi D. Sciocchetti, who repainted the ceiling of the Cathedral Basilica of St. Joseph in the 1920s modeled the cherubs in his work on the family's children.

Brooke Hart had worked in his family's department store during much of his youth and was well-known and liked by the local community. After he graduated from Santa Clara University, his father, A.J., made him a junior vice president and began grooming him to take over when he retired.

== Disappearance ==
Key locations during the kidnapping
1 Hart's Department Store
2 San Jose Country Club, intended destination
3 Hart's Studebaker abandoned on Evans Lane/Piedmont Drive
4 San Mateo Bridge

Just before 6:00 p.m. on Thursday, November 9, 1933, Brooke Hart retrieved his 1933 Studebaker President roadster, a graduation present from his parents, from a downtown San Jose parking lot behind the department store. He had agreed to chauffeur his father, A.J., who did not drive, to a meeting of the Chamber of Commerce at the San Jose Country Club.

When Brooke did not turn up to collect his father, A.J. became concerned. As hours passed and there remained no sign of Brooke, the Hart family's anxiety grew; Brooke was responsible and punctual, and his absence was entirely out of character. A.J. confessed his worry to Perry Belshaw, the manager of the San Jose Country Club, during dinner; after Brooke's friend phoned to say the younger Hart had missed an appointment at 8:00 p.m., A.J. called the police to determine if his son had been involved in an accident.

According to the parking lot attendant, Brooke had left the lot heading east on Santa Clara Avenue at 6:05 p.m.; he was later spotted around 6:30 p.m. by a Hart store employee at Santa Clara and Fourteenth. Finally, a rancher in Milpitas, seven miles north of San Jose, saw a man matching Hart's description standing alone next to an automobile on Evans Lane at approximately 7 p.m.; when the rancher returned, he saw the car still parked there at approximately 8:30 p.m. with no one else present.

=== Ransom demands ===
At 9:30 that night, Aleese Hart, the older of Brooke's two younger sisters, answered the telephone at the family home and was informed by a "soft-spoken man" that Hart had been kidnapped and that instructions for his return would be provided later. At 10:30, what sounded like the same man called and informed the other sister, Miriam, that her brother would be returned upon payment of $40,000 (equivalent to $916,960 in 2022). Delivery instructions would be provided the next day. According to phone company records, the kidnappers had tried to reach the Hart home three times but the line was busy before they were finally connected. Belshaw lived near the site where the Studebaker had been parked and reported the abandoned car in Milpitas to the police at 11 p.m.; it was positively identified as Brooke's.

Selected key locations in San Jose
1 Hart's Department Store (Market & Santa Clara)
2 Jack Holmes house (1070 Bird Ave)
3 Hart Mansion (The Alameda & Naglee)
4 St. James Park

The San Jose Police Department, the Santa Clara County Sheriff's Office, and the U.S. Division of Investigation (the forerunner of the FBI) were quickly brought into the case. The phone calls were traced to locations in San Francisco; the call that connected was traced to the Whitcomb Hotel. However, the search initially focused on the hilly region surrounding Calaveras Dam and the city of Oakland; the call's origin was thought to be a decoy action.

Hart's wallet was discovered in San Francisco on the guard rail of the tanker Midway, which had been refueling the Matson Lines passenger liner SS Lurline when both ships were docked at Pier 32 from midnight to 5 a.m. It was assumed the wallet had been tossed from a porthole on the liner. Lurline was stopped and searched in Los Angeles when it arrived there on its way to Honolulu on November 11, but nothing was found. Police then advanced an alternative theory: since Pier 32, from which Lurline had departed, was close to the sewer outfall, the heavily laden tanker might have dipped below the surface and picked up the wallet from where it had been discharged from the sewer, lifting it from the bay once a sufficient amount of fuel had been offloaded. One of the passengers detained during the three-hour search was Babe Ruth, who was traveling to Los Angeles to watch a football game between Southern California and Stanford.

At the time, the Oakland Tribune named Charles "Pretty Boy" Floyd a suspect in the kidnapping, as he was reportedly present in California. Floyd was later spotted in Almaden, near abandoned quicksilver mine shafts. While searching for Floyd or Hart at the mine, a man claiming to be Floyd boarded a bus in Modesto and robbed passengers using a gun.

The Hart family chartered an airplane to look for cabins in the hills near Milpitas starting on November 12, following up a theory that Brooke had been first lured to the area where his car was abandoned, and the kidnappers then took him from there. Because the car's lights were left on, and there were signs of a scuffle, authorities believed Brooke had been overpowered in Milpitas. In addition, witnesses who had seen Brooke driving the Studebaker said that he was alone, although in some cases visibility was poor.

A "compromise ransom" telegram from Sacramento arrived on November 12, suggesting that $20,000 (equivalent to $497,000 in 2025) would be sufficient. However, the family was not contacted again until Monday, November 13, when a letter, postmarked in Sacramento, arrived in the mail at the department store. It instructed A.J. to have a radio installed in the Studebaker (which already had a radio), because the ransom instructions would be broadcast over NBC radio station KPO. The kidnapper also instructed A.J. to be ready to drive the Studebaker to deliver the ransom, but A.J. had never learned to drive. On November 13, A.J. posted a $5,000 reward for his son's safe return, with a promise to drop any further investigation upon his return. To emphasize the validity of the reward offer, police announced they would not be tracing calls to the Hart residence. However, this was a ruse to entrap the kidnappers; in fact, the telephone line continued to be tapped.

On Tuesday, November 14, a second ransom note arrived, this time postmarked in San Francisco. It instructed A.J. to place the ransom in a black satchel and drive to Los Angeles. That night, A.J. took a call from a man claiming to be his son's kidnapper, who instructed him to take the night train to Los Angeles. The authorities staked out the train station and mistakenly arrested a bank teller out for an evening stroll. The next day, a sign was placed in a window of the Hart store stating that A.J. did not drive. A call was received that night again demanding that Hart drive to deliver the ransom. Hart demanded proof that his son was with the caller. The caller stated that Brooke was being held at a safe location. Because a phone tap had been placed on the Hart telephone, the call was traced to a garage in downtown San Jose, but the caller was gone by the time the authorities arrived.

=== Arrests and confessions ===
Confessions printed in Oakland Tribune, November 16 & 17, 1933
Harold Thurmond (Nov 16)	John Holmes (Nov 17)
Then we came to the San Mateo bridge and drove onto it for about a half mile to where the water flows under the bridge. We stopped the car and ordered Brooke to get out. He started to cry for help and Holmes hit him over the head a couple of times with one of the bricks. They were pretty good blows and he didn't give us much trouble after that. We then tied his arms behind him with the wire and also bound his legs with it. We picked him up hand and foot and heaved him over into the water. I don't know whether he cried out or not. I don't know whether he was conscious or not. Or whether he drowned, or was killed before he hit the water. Before we threw him over we took his wallet away from him. There was $15 in it and we split the money between us.	Brooke asked for a cigarette on the way to the bridge and I gave him one. When we got to the bridge Harold [Thurmond] told him to get out of the car and started to tie him up with some wire. We led him to believe we were going to transfer him to another car. At this moment an automobile came over the bridge and Brooke started to shout for help. I hit him with my fist and knocked him down. It was a good blow and I don't think he ever snapped out of it. I wanted to show him we meant business. Harold got the concrete blocks and tied them to Brooke's feet. Then I said to Harold: "Let's give it to him." Then we picked him up and threw him overboard. He struggled around down there and Harold said: "Give me the gun. I'll fix him up." I gave him the gun and he climbed over the railing and held on to the bridge stringers and fired away. We couldn't see Brooke. It was dark. But we could hear him floundering about.... The next day we got together and we were appalled by what we had done. "I didn't know I could do a thing like that," Harold said. "It sure was terrible." "Yes," I said, "it sort of gets me. I didn't think I could do it either."

Another demand arrived the following day, November 16, again ordering A.J. to drive with the ransom. That night, another call was received and the demand that A.J. drive was repeated. The call was traced to a payphone in a parking garage at Market near San Antonio, and Police Chief J.N. Black and Sheriff William Emig hurried to the scene just 150 feet (46 m) from the San Jose Police station, where they arrested Thomas Harold Thurmond as he was hanging up, at about 8:00 p.m.

At 3:00 a.m., Thurmond, after hours of questioning, signed a confession in which he claimed to have bound Brooke's hands with wire and tossed him off the San Mateo Bridge into San Francisco Bay sometime between 7:00 and 7:30 on the night of the kidnapping. He also identified an accomplice: John Holmes, a recently unemployed salesman who was separated from his wife and two children. Holmes was arrested in his SRO room at the California Hotel near the San Jose Police station at 3:30 a.m. According to Thurmond's confession, Holmes approached him with the scheme six weeks prior, after he had separated from his family.

At 1:00 p.m. on November 17, Holmes signed a confession admitting that he and Thurmond had kidnapped Brooke and thrown him into San Francisco Bay. Later, the Santa Clara County District Attorney advised the press that, unless corroborated by independent evidence, confessions by Thurmond and Holmes in which each blamed the other for the crime were not admissible in a court of law. In his confession, Holmes stated that Thurmond had come up with the plan: "A couple of days before the kidnapping, [Thurmond and I] went to a show. On the way out he grabbed my arm and said, 'There goes Brookie Hart. If we pick him up we can get a nice piece of change." In Thurmond's earlier confession, he stated Holmes made the decision to murder Brooke: "Thursday afternoon, November 9, I went to Merritt's plumbing shop and bought three bricks for 10 cents each and 55 cents' worth of wire to make preparations to kidnap Brooke Hart. I don't know whether Holmes planned to murder the boy at that time but at any rate we wanted to be prepared."

According to the men's confessions, when Brooke stopped his car near the exit of the parking lot in the evening of November 9, Thurmond slipped into the passenger seat and, holding a gun on him, forced Brooke to drive to Milpitas. There they abandoned the Studebaker for another waiting car, which had been driven to the rendezvous point by Holmes, and the group of three drove to the San Mateo Bridge.

A mother and daughter on a farm immediately south of Milpitas had seen a dark, long-hooded sedan with three men stopped near their barn. A few minutes after it stopped, a convertible (presumably the Studebaker roadster) with three men – two on the running boards and one driving – stopped near the sedan. Their description of the man driving the convertible, slender with light colored hair, matched the description of Brooke, as did the convertible as his car. Brooke was driven away in the larger car. According to the farmers, one of the group followed in the Studebaker. The mother did not report the events until the following Monday (November 13), when she was visiting relatives and learned about the kidnapping. The investigators did not agree on the veracity of the story, because the number of kidnappers did not agree with the recorded confessions.

On the bridge, the men ordered Brooke out of the car, and one of the kidnappers struck him twice on the head from behind with a concrete block until he was unconscious. They then bound his arms with baling wire and tied two 22 lb (10.0 kg) concrete blocks to his feet before dumping him off the bridge into the bay. The tide was out and there were only a few feet of water at the base of the bridge; the kidnappers then shot Brooke, killing him. According to Thurmond's confession, Brooke struggled in the water for a few minutes and may have been able to free himself from his bonds; after they had tossed him over the north side of the bridge, he moved south under the bridge, against the prevailing current. Thurmond also stated Holmes was the first to shoot at Brooke, but Thurmond shot at him after he had drifted under the bridge. After leaving Brooke in the bay, they stopped approximately 1 mile (1.6 km) from the eastern end, where they discarded an extra concrete block and a roll of wire, which were recovered after the confessions. A few hours later, they placed the first telephone call to the Hart family demanding $40,000 for Hart's return.

Two men scavenging for wood in the bay, Cal Coley and Vinton Ridley, heard screams for help at approximately 7:25 p.m. on the night of November 9, when Brooke was kidnapped, and tried to rescue him, but were hampered by muddy conditions. The two said the cries for help came from the bridge near the shore of Alameda, but added they did not hear any shots that night.

Local newspapers reported that Holmes and Thurmond had met with psychiatrists and would attempt to plead not guilty by reason of insanity. Thurmond claimed he had been "crazy" for more than a year, since his sweetheart married another man, and Holmes planned to repudiate his confession, which his attorney claimed had been "forced from him by third-degree methods", including threats to "turn him over to the mob for lynching if he did not confess". Upon learning of rumors of a possible insanity plea on the part of Thurmond, law enforcement authorities directed two psychiatrists from Agnews State Mental Hospital in Santa Clara to examine the two men to preclude such a defense. Following cursory examinations in their cells at the Santa Clara County Jail, with a mob outside in the jail courtyard, both men were declared sane.

=== Search for the body ===
Police officers from Santa Clara, San Mateo, and Alameda Counties began searching the bay around the bridge, hoping to find Brooke's body. Trace evidence, including stains on the bridge, "blonde hair on a brick" and other markings convinced authorities the confessors had truthfully described the sequence of events, including dumping Brooke.

The first physical clues were unearthed on November 18. Two 22-pound (10.0 kg) bricks and apparent bloodstains were found at the bridge. The pillowcase used to mask Brooke during the drive to the bridge was discovered, along with his hat, by November 20. The discovery of the hat ended the last hope of the family that Brooke would be found alive. A hook-studded apparatus was used to drag the bay, with no success. A weighted dummy was planned to be dropped from the bridge on November 21 in an attempt to see where it would float. Workers constructing a pier of the San Francisco–Oakland Bay Bridge reported seeing a body floating in the water during the night of November 22, prompting a search by Oakland and San Francisco police boats, including the shores of nearby Goat Island. Alex Hart announced a $500 (equivalent to $12,400 in 2025) reward on November 24, hoping to "enlist the aid of the public in the search". By that time, the search involved a blimp from Sunnyvale, police boats from Oakland and San Francisco, United States Marines and a hydraulic pump to dredge the mud from underneath the San Mateo Bridge.

The official search for Brooke's body ended on November 25. The next day, two duck hunters from Redwood City discovered a badly decayed and crab-eaten body approximately 0.5 miles (0.80 km) south of the bridge. Brooke's body was identified by the coroner and his friends and employees later that day, with several personal effects with the body matched to Brooke's known possessions. According to the autopsy, Brooke had died from drowning, and there were no bullet wounds found.

== Lynching of Thurmond and Holmes ==
=== Warning signs ===
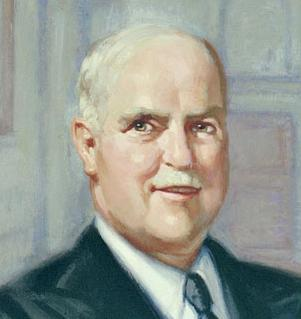
Gov. "Sunny Jim" Rolph

Because of lynch threats, Sheriff Emig moved Thurmond and Holmes to the Potrero Hill police station in San Francisco for safekeeping soon after their arrest. A San Jose newspaper ran a front-page editorial branding Holmes and Thurmond "human devils" and called for "mob violence". Upon their return to the San Francisco jail from questioning, cries of "lynch them" were heard from the crowd surrounding that jail. On November 21, Holmes and Thurmond remained in the jail, and fear of vigilantism led authorities to announce they would be held "indefinitely". Reportedly, "20 influential friends of the socially prominent Hart family" had formed a committee to "insist on immediate and drastic punishment for the prisoners". Prosecutors declined to seek grand jury hearings in the fear that an indictment would incite vigilantes.

Let the sheriff handle the matter. He can appoint as many deputies as he wants; he has the power. I am not going to call the guard to protect the kidnapers who wilfully killed a fine boy like that. Let the law take its course.

— Governor James "Sunny Jim" Rolph, November 23, 1933 comments to reporters in Los Angeles

Despite these fears, the pair were indicted on charges of extortion, using the mails for extortion, and conspiracy, and were returned to the San Jose jail the night of November 22. On November 23, California Governor James Rolph announced to shocked reporters that he would refuse to dispatch the National Guard to protect Thurmond and Holmes.

Upon payment of $10,000 (equivalent to $249,000 in 2025) cash – an astonishing sum in 1933 – by the father of Jack Holmes, San Francisco attorney Vincent Hallinan agreed to represent his son. Thurmond was defended by J. Oscar Goldstein of Chico. With a volatile mob growing day and night outside the jail on November 24, Hallinan called Rolph and asked that he call out the National Guard should an effort be made to lynch his client. Rolph retorted that he would "pardon the lynchers".

=== Overnight lynching November 26–27 ===
Authorities "expected trouble if and when the missing body was found". After the discovery of Brooke's body on Sunday, November 26, word went out immediately throughout northern California. All day Sunday and into the evening, radio stations issued inflammatory announcements that a lynching would occur that night in St. James Park in San Jose. Crowds began to gather outside the jail at around 11 a.m., shortly after local newspapers had run extra editions announcing that Brooke's body had been found. Sheriff Emig ordered the erection of an improvised barricade of parked automobiles and trucks to protect the jail. By 9:00 p.m., a mob estimated by the press to range anywhere from 5,000 to 15,000 men, women, and children were jammed into the park, with an estimated 3,000 vehicles left on streets nearby.

Governor Rolph was in regular telephonic communication with Raymond Cato, whom he had appointed to head the California Highway Patrol. Cato was ensconced in the home of a Rolph political ally and neighbor in the mountains west of San Jose with an open phone line to the jail. Although the crowd was characterized as "good natured" earlier in the day, periodically there was an ominous chanting of "Eleven o'clock!"

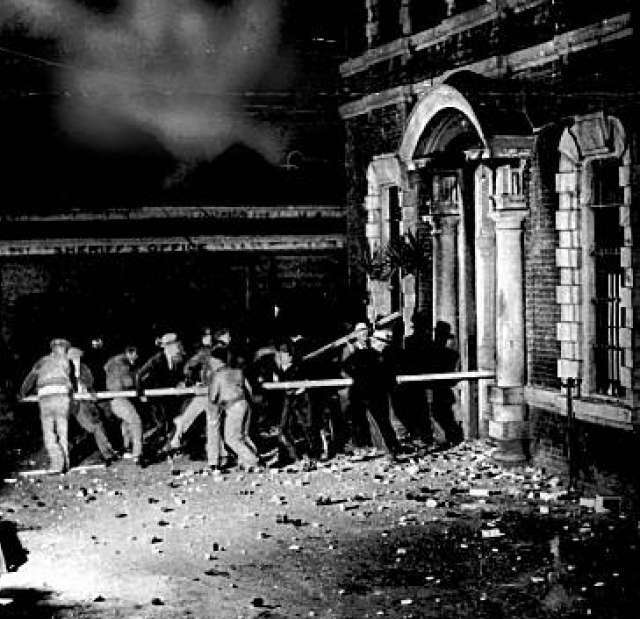
The lynch mob taking a battering ram to the doors of the jailhouse

At approximately 9:00 p.m., Rolph canceled a planned trip to the Western Governors' Conference in Boise, Idaho, to prevent his chief political rival, Lieutenant Governor Frank Merriam, from calling out the National Guard to stop the lynchings. At approximately the same time, the crowd began demanding the jail surrender Holmes and Thurmond; they responded to the refusal by moving the improvised siege barriers aside. Sheriff Emig contacted Rolph at 10:30 p.m., asking that the National Guard be deployed to protect the prisoners. Rolph refused. The assault on the jail commenced at approximately 11 p.m.

By midnight, thousands had gathered outside the jail; the sheriff's deputies fired tear gas into the crowd in an attempt to disperse them. However, the crowd became angrier and larger. After the first round of tear gas was launched into the crowd, the nearby construction site at the post office was raided for materials that were first thrown at the jail; later, a battering ram was improvised from a heavy pipe. Emig ordered his officers to abandon the bottom two floors of the jail, where Thurmond and Holmes were being held. It was later noted that both cells had been occupied by other notorious murderers. Emig also had ordered that no police officer would be allowed to use their guns or clubs to defend the jail; Emig, his nine deputies, and eight state patrolmen were all beaten, choked, and/or trampled during the course of the riot.

They opened Holmes' cell first on the second floor. And then they brought in a length of rope. There must have been 50 men who entered his cell. I stood outside.
"Are you Holmes?" the man with the mask shouted at the prisoner cringing in the corner. "No, I'm not Holmes," he replied.
"You're a damned liar, I know you," the masked lyncher cried and many hands drew the rope around Holmes' neck. He cried for mercy.
"Spare me, spare me; don't take me out, don't deliver me to that crazy mob," Holmes pleaded.
Fists crashed against his face. He went down on the floor, still crying for mercy. Then he was kicked and then they spat on him. His head was knocked against the floor. Dragging him on the end of the rope, they pulled him head first downstairs. Then these 50 leaders came up again to me and asked me if that was Holmes they had taken out.
When I told them I didn't know, they said:
"You're a liar, Moore. You brought him from San Francisco and we know it."
Once again I was choked and thrown on the floor.
Then the mob pushed upstairs and entered Thurmond's cell but they could not find him. They came back and demanded matches. With the aid of the matches and a candle they searched the cell. In a small closet, adjoining the cell but still a part of it, they found Thurmond.
Like a human fly, he had crawled up the walls, bracing himself against the sides with his feet and hands, to a height of 15 feet. It is an oddly-built closet and extends up to the roof. When they sighted him in the light of the matches, the most terrible blood-curdling cries of fiendish delight I have ever heard rang through the jail.

— Deputy John Moore, quoted in Oakland Tribune article by Harry A. Lerner, November 27, 1933

The mob, by this time estimated at 6,000–10,000 (other reports say 3,000–5,000), stormed the jail, took Holmes and Thurmond across the street to St. James Park, and hanged them. Afterward, deputy sheriff John Moore stated, "I never knew human beings could go so wild – they were not human; they were animals." Deputy Moore was choked twice during the lynching: once when he refused to surrender the keys to the jail cells, and another time when he refused to positively identify Holmes for the mob. Some women in the mob were alleged to have encouraged the violence, seemingly forgetting their prior advice to let the law "take its course".

Thurmond was the first to be lynched. As he was dragged from the jail headfirst, the mob beat him and knotted the rope around his neck; one man who attempted to stop the lynching was "picked up bodily and hurled almost over the heads of the crowd". After Thurmond was hanged, the mob tore his trousers off and souvenir hunters fought over the scraps. Holmes cried, "You're making a big mistake! I'm not the man you want!" as he was lynched. Harold Fitzgerald described the scene in an Oakland Tribune article: "A concerted pull – and the white, blood-streaked body of the second of Brooke Hart's murderers swayed in a grisly rhythm in the light of a rising half-moon. A roar, mingled with women's screams, rolled across the park ... [Afterward,] The crowd began pouring out of the park. Some did serpentine dances in the streets. ... Snatches of song came from here and there in the multitude."

=== Aftermath ===
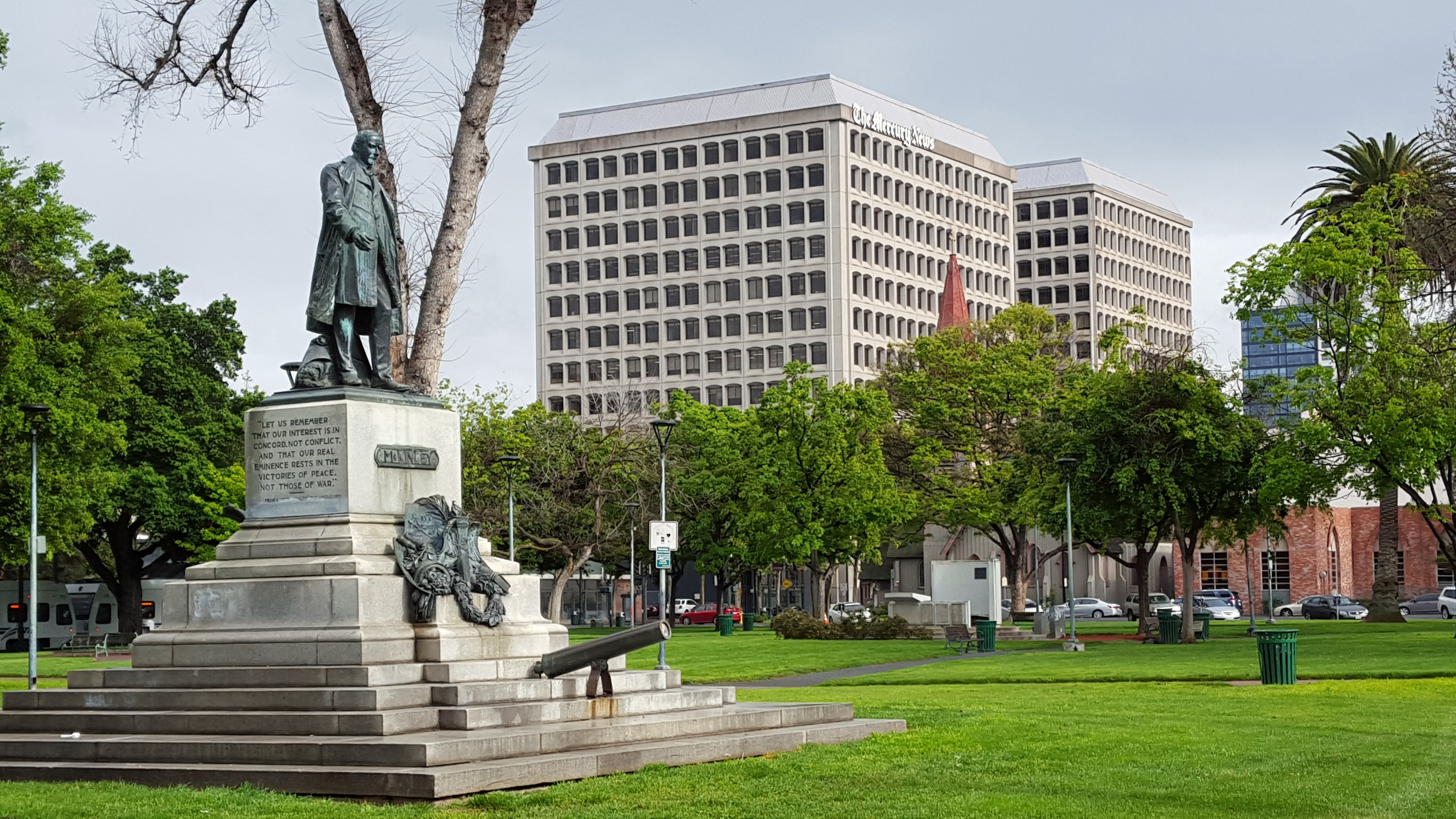
Holmes was hanged from an elm tree that once stood near the McKinley memorial in St. James Park.

The bodies of Thurmond and Holmes were left hanging for approximately 45 minutes, until they were cut down by police officials. Thurmond was buried in an unmarked plot in Oak Hill Memorial Park on November 29, the cemetery where Brooke had been buried on November 27. Holmes was cremated at Oak Hill on November 29.

According to the San Francisco Chronicle, on December 2, after a special meeting of the city council heard testimony in support of leaving the cork elm tree as a monument and warning to evildoers, the council approved the cutting down of the tree by city workers. Police were required to keep off a crowd of souvenir hunters seeking a twig or branch of the infamous "gallows tree", the bark and lower branches having been hacked and stripped for mementos.

== Impact of the case ==
The lynching was unique in American political and criminal justice history because of the involvement of a state governor, and the eagerness by civic and business leaders and law enforcement, to allow the extrajudicial killings of two men who had not been indicted, arraigned, tried, or sentenced for the crime in a court of law. Many modern historians conclude that the two men were indeed guilty.

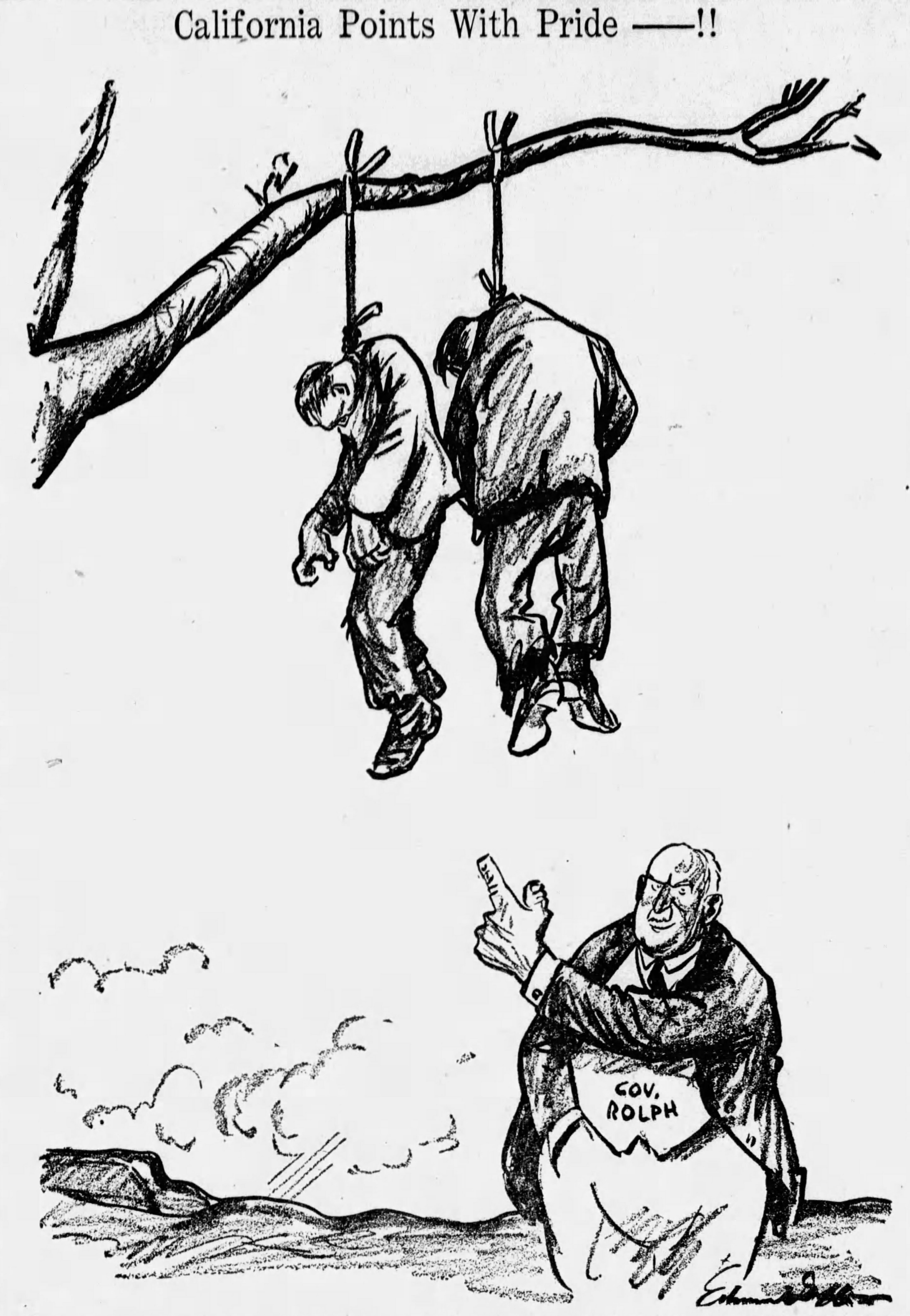
"California Points With Pride" (Edmund Duffy, 1933)

Royce Brier, a staff writer for the Chronicle, would later go on to win the 1934 Pulitzer Prize for Reporting for his account of the lynching. According to the prize citation, Brier worked for sixteen hours along with several assistants mingling with the mob and telephoning running updates from a garage across the street from the jail before composing the story in three hours starting at 12:30 a.m. on the morning of November 27. In addition, the Pulitzer Prize for Editorial Cartooning went to Edmund Duffy of The Baltimore Sun for his cartoon, "California Points With Pride", which lampooned Governor Rolph's response to the lynching.

=== Prosecution of lynch mob ===
Governor Rolph praised the action, stating that California had sent a message to future kidnappers, and promised to pardon anyone involved in the lynching. However, Rolph died on June 2, 1934, before any charges had been filed in the case.

Alameda County District Attorney Earl Warren was the strongest supporter of prosecution for the lynching. Santa Clara County Assistant District Attorney Herbert Bridges was quoted as saying he was "not sorry [the lynching] happened in San Jose". Santa Clara County District Attorney Fred Thomas doubted anyone could be found to bear witness against the ringleaders of the lynching, characterizing the stories being told by local youths as "boastful" but uncorroborated. The American Civil Liberties Union stated they had found eyewitnesses ready to identify members of the mob by December 1933, but San Jose citizens were outspoken in their opposition to "outsider" interference. Eventually seven people were arrested for the lynchings, but none was convicted. California did not specifically define lynching as a crime, although crimes committed during the lynching such as rioting, assault, and murder could potentially be prosecuted.

One young man was charged for participating in the lynching after he publicly claimed credit for leading the mob, but the charges were dropped. The Santa Clara County grand jury met the following year, but despite literally thousands of witnesses, scores of reporters, and hundreds of photographs, they found that no witnesses could identify anyone from the lynching, so no charges were filed.

=== Public criticism ===
In the aftermath of the lynching, Governor Rolph was publicly condemned for advocating "lynch law" by former President Herbert Hoover, then at Stanford University in Palo Alto. Rolph replied, "If troops had been called out, hundreds of innocent citizens might have been mowed down." Rolph accused Hoover of calling out the United States Army against the "Bonus Marchers" in 1932. The exchange continued. President Franklin D. Roosevelt also condemned the lynching as "collective murder" in a nationwide radio address.

=== Civil suits ===
Holmes' parents sued Governor Rolph for his role in the lynching of their son, along with radio station KQW and several other persons, but the suit was dropped when the governor died of a heart attack in 1934. Holmes's widow sued Sheriff Emig and several deputies, citing their carelessness and negligence in failing to protect him. Thurmond's family took no action on his behalf and reportedly never again spoke about the matter amongst themselves.

=== "Last Lynching in California" ===
This incident is sometimes referred to as "the last lynching in California", although Clyde Johnson was lynched near Yreka in August 1935. Additionally, in 1992 a man named Edward J Begley published on a website making allegations to have witnessed the last true California lynching in front of the one room schoolhouse in Callahan on January 6, 1947. Begley, then a 6 year old 1st grader, claimed that on that day, he arrived at school to find a black man with a bullet wound wrapped in a calf hide hanging from a nearby utility pole, and was quickly ushered inside by Mary Roth, the teacher. When he later went outside, he witnessed county officials including the coroner and sheriff's deputies as well as CHP officers lowering the body, and that an unidentified man present told him "That's to teach you kids what happens when you rustle cattle." Begley said that his teacher informed the students never to speak of the incident, but that in the late 1980s he began seeking out his classmates to corroborate his childhood memories, the website being published as part of the efforts. In 1994, Begley wrote to the Siskiyou County Historical Society asking for further assistance with his search.

The name of the victim, an alleged cattle rustler, said to be a butcher from Weed, who had been initially shot and wounded on a ranch owned by a well known Yreka medical doctor near Gazelle in Southern Siskiyou County before being hung in Callahan, has never been released and the event cannot be confirmed in any printed news publications. However, a 2019 investigation by Jefferson Public Radio supported Begley's claim that the January 10th, 1947 edition of the Western Sentinel, which allegedly reported on the incident, was collected and destroyed by complicit local authorities, finding every available archive of the paper to be missing that issue. Begley also made similar claims about the January 12th edition of the Etna Gazette. Begley's son Michael was skeptical of his father's claims, stating that he was conspiratorial, but historian Ken Gonzales-Day found the claims credible enough to include as an unconfirmed case in his book on California lynchings.

== Family ==
Brooke Hart had three sisters – Jeanette, Miriam, and Aleese – and a brother, Alexander Joseph Jr. Alex J. Hart sold the chain of stores in 1976.

== Modern coverage ==
In 1983, Harry Farrell, a columnist for the San Jose Mercury News, wrote about the lynching in a two-part series. After he retired, he followed up with a book on the same subject, Swift Justice, published in 1992. Swift Justice was praised by Walter Cronkite and won an Edgar Award in 1993.

In his 2007 book Jury Rigging in the Court of Public Opinion, the author John D. Murphy criticized Farrell's approach, noting that by accepting the confessions as the baseline truth and hewing to the "conventional" history that led to mob justice, Farrell had invented conversations and created motivations that were impossible to corroborate and glossed over inconsistencies. Murphy pointed out the later phone calls placed to make ransom demands came from payphones physically close together, culminating in the arrest of Thurmond at a payphone only 150 feet (46 m) from the San Jose Police station. Murphy went on to write and produce a movie, Valley of the Heart's Delight, regarding the 1933 case.

== In popular media ==
At least four films have been made loosely based on this story:

- Fury (1936)
- The Sound of Fury (1950) aka Try and Get Me!
- Night Without Justice (2004)
- Valley of the Heart's Delight (2006)

The 1933 lynching also inspired a short story by John Steinbeck, "The Lonesome Vigilante" (1936). It was subsequently published as "The Vigilante", collected in The Long Valley (1938).

Former San Jose mayor Tom McEnery wrote a play based on Farrell's 1992 book. The play, produced in early 2016 by the San Jose-based Tabard Theatre Company, shares the book's name, Swift Justice.

== See also ==
- List of kidnappings
- List of solved missing person cases (pre-1950)
