= BPP University =

Private university in the United Kingdom

Coordinates: 51°30′18″N 0°13′23″W

- Former names: BPP Law School (1992); BPP College of Professional Studies (2005); BPP University College of Professional Studies (2010)
- Motto: University for the Professions
- Type: Private, for-profit
- Established: 1992; 32 years ago
- Parent institution: BPP Holdings, TDR Capital
- Chancellor: Martyn W Jones
- Vice-chancellor: Tim Stuart
- Students: 38,000 (2025)
- Location: 6 London centres, 12 across rest of England, and 2 in Channel Islands
- Website: bpp.com

BPP University is a private for-profit university in the United Kingdom. Running courses in law, accountancy, business, nursing, and technology, the for-profit institution is currently a part of BPP Education Group. Established in 1976 as an accountancy school, the school was granted degree-awarding powers in 2007 and renamed BPP University College of Professional Studies in 2010. It gained full university status in 2013 as BPP University, with a governing board of nine directors. It operates four schools: BPP University Business School, BPP University Law School, BPP University School of Technology, and BPP University School of Nursing.

== History ==
=== Founding and early years (1976-2013) ===
BPP (Brierley Price Prior) was established in 1976 as an accountancy school. Its three co-founders, Alan Brierley, Richard Price and Charles Prior, used the initials of their surnames for the company name. All three previously worked teaching accountancy for the Financial Training Company. The company listed on the London Stock Exchange, and while initially known as a training college for accountants, it also expanded into legal training. In the mid-2000s, the school began working with a number of UK law firms to rework the Legal Practice Course (LPC) used to train employees. BPP began expanding in the UK, opening study centers in cities such as Leeds and Manchester and seeing an increase in overseas enrollments.

BPP was first granted degree-awarding powers in 2007, becoming the first private-sector company to be given that power in the UK. That year, BPP Law School began offering LLM degrees in legal practice, followed by an LLM in commercial law in 2008. It began offering undergraduate law degrees in 2009 when it set up its Bachelor of Laws (LL.B.) programme. On July 30, 2009, American private education company Apollo Global acquired BPP in a deal worth approximately $607 million, and BPP became an Apollo Inc. subsidiary.

In July 2010, BPP was based in London with 14 regional branches. It had 6,500 students taking courses in its law and business schools and 30,000 students taking accountancy qualifications. In 2010, the school was awarded the title of university college by Universities and Science Minister David Willetts, and renamed BPP University College of Professional Studies. It was the first time a private institution had been named a university college in 30 years, following the University of Buckingham. By 2013, under CEO Carl Lygo, BPP University College of Professional Studies offered undergraduate and postgraduate courses in business, law, finance, and tax accountancy, charging yearly tuition fees of around £5,000 per year for a three-year degree.

=== Renaming as BPP University (2013-2016) ===
On August 8, 2013, the school was granted the title of university and rebranded BPP University, becoming the second for-profit college in the UK to receive the title. Lygo was named founding vice-chancellor. The granting of university status was criticized by the University and College Union, which objected to for-profit companies becoming universities. Earlier that year, the union had urged UK Business Secretary Vince Cable to suspend BPP's application for university title pending an investigation into its relationship with its parent companies, saying "the interests of BPP students and the international credibility of the UK university title" were at risk. In November 2013, BPP was awarded the Education Investor magazine's "Higher/Professional Education Provider of the Year 2013" title. In 2016 CIS London & Partners partnered with BPP University to offer its MBA (Legal Services) programme in Russia and the Commonwealth of Independent States (CIS).

=== New ownership (2017-2020) ===
Apollo Education Group purchased BPP University in 2017. After launching a degree programme in dental and oral sciences in 2016, BPP University shut the programme down in 2017 after it failed to meet General Dental Council standards. This left new students unable to start and existing undergraduate students facing an uncertain future. Subsequently, the law school's undergraduate Bachelor of Laws (LL.B.) programme was suspended in May 2018 pending a review of the law school's entire programme portfolio. Enrollment in the LL.B. programme had dropped from 665 in 2014 to 105 students in 2017. As a result of the LL.B. suspension, in July 2018, several staff were fired from the Waterloo campus. Also in 2018 the law school closed its Liverpool campus, telling students to continue their studies at the Manchester campus instead.

In 2018, BPP University had around 15,000 students. It was part of the global BPP Professional Education Group, and a subsidiary of AP VIII Queso Holdings. In November 2018, BPP's apprenticeship provision was given an 'Insufficient' rating by Ofsted, and in February 2019, the Department for Education banned BPP from recruiting certain new apprentices, citing ‘insufficient progress’ among the students. In May 2019, The Lawyer reported that BPP University in London was the most expensive Bar Professional Training Course (BPTC) course provider in the country for students in 2019–20, with fees nearly £3,000 higher than the national average. It was reported in June 2019 that Apollo Education Group was looking to sell the university. In December 2019, BPP Law School was taken off the market.

=== Unfair faculty dismissal and Wikipedia ===
From June to July 2020, it was reported that former employee Employment Law lecturer Elizabeth Aylott has successfully brought a constructive unfair dismissal claim after BPP University failed to reduce her workload despite her mental health struggles. Her concerns, later diagnosed as Autism Spectrum Disorder, were repeatedly raised as issues in reference to her workload, including a period of working over 55 hours per week and having to cancel annual leave in order to meet work demands. The employment tribunal found that Aylott had been unfairly dismissed on the basis that BPP University's conduct had undermined trust and confidence. It was also held that an occupational health referral for Aylott was not arranged in a timely manner, and there had been a rush to secure her departure from the university as a result of stigma arising from her mental health.

The tribunal's judgment was that BPP University did unfairly dismiss Aylott and did treat her "unfavourably" in regard to her disability pursuant to the Equality Act 2010 (EqA). However, under the EqA, the tribunal also dismissed claims of direct disability discrimination, harassment relating to her disability, indirect disability discrimination, and failure to make reasonable adjustments.

In December 2020, Legal Cheek reported that Wikipedia accounts linked to BPP Law School's PR company had been accused of "disruptive editing" in regards to the case.

=== Professional apprenticeship and present ===
BPP University was granted indefinite degree-awarding powers (DAPs) by the Office for Students in 2020. In 2020, BPP and Grant Thornton LLP launched a coaching professional apprenticeship. During the COVID pandemic in 2020, the university faced a number of complaints from students and student groups over matters such as physical requirements for remote exams, class size, and fees, among other issues. In May 2020, BPP was accused of withholding January exam results from students whose fees were overdue, with over 700 BPP students said to have been affected. On March 20, 2020, it was reported that one student felt the university had not clearly communicated information to students after a student at its Waterloo campus tested positive for COVID-19.

In March 2021, BPP was acquired by private equity house TDR Capital from Apollo Global for £700 million. Also in March 2021, BPP launched two data apprenticeship programs for Grant Thornton and Mazars. In May 2021, official data from education watchdog Office for Students found the university to be the lowest ranked institution in the UK for student employability, and that a year after graduating, 69% of BPP University students had "not managed to secure graduate employment or further study." In August 2023, the university attributed growth in its annual earnings to increasing enrollment in its business and nursing schools. BPP University in 2024 remained "one of only three for-profit providers [in the UK] operating at the same scale as a traditional public university," along with the University of Law and Arden University.

== Organisation and administration ==
Part of BPP Education Group, BPP University is governed by a board of nine directors, with Tim Stewart serving as vice-chancellor and Aaron Porter serving as chair as of 2024.

== Students and programs ==
BPP University had approximately 38,000 students in 2025. According to the Higher Education Statistics Agency, in 2024, 12,000 of them were full-time equivalent students taking higher education courses.

With both undergraduate and postgraduate programs, BPP University has courses in accountancy and tax, law, leadership and management, data and analytics, digital marketing, and nursing and healthcare. It also provides apprenticeships and degree apprenticeships in areas including accountancy and tax, software, and nursing, among others.

== Schools and locations ==
BPP University has four constituent schools:

- BPP University Business School
- BPP University Law School
- BPP University School of Technology
- BPP University School of Nursing

The head office is at BPP House, Aldine Place, 142-144 Uxbridge Road, London, W12 8AA. There are several BPP University locations in London, as well as facilities and study centres in locations such as Birmingham, Leeds, Manchester, Newcastle, Nottingham, Bristol, Cambridge, Reading, and Southampton.

=== BPP University Law School ===
BPP University Law School operates out of two facilities in London, and is based in the borough of Holborn. It also has centres in Birmingham, Bristol, Cambridge, Leeds and Manchester.

In December 2019, BPP University Law School was partnered and appointed as the provider of training for Solicitors Qualifying Examination (SQE) to the City Consortium.

In 2021, BPP Law School launched a pro bono clinic.

A reverse mentoring scheme was launched by BPP University Law School in January 2022, where law students reviewed law firms on diversity and inclusion. In 2022, BPP Law School partnered with the O Shaped Lawyer for the SQE preparation courses.

In November 2025, BPP Law School added Harvey AI software to training programs for solicitors and barristers.

== Notable alumni ==
- Hammad Azhar, businessman and minister
- Kenny Imafidon, author and journalist
- Jodie Grinham, archer

== See also ==
- List of UCAS institutions
- Armorial of UK universities
- List of universities in the United Kingdom
- List of universities and higher education colleges in London
- List of for-profit universities and colleges
