= Apollo Education Group =

Corporation based in Phoenix, Arizona

Apollo Education Group, Inc.
- Type: Private
- Traded as: Nasdaq: APOL
- Industry: For-profit education
- Founded: 1973; 53 years ago
- Founder: John Sperling
- Headquarters: Phoenix, Arizona, U.S.
- Key people: Anthony W. Miller (chairman); Gregory W. Cappelli (CEO); Jeff Langenbach (SVP); Peter J. Cohen (president, University of Phoenix)
- Subsidiaries: Apollo Global; BPP Holdings; College for Financial Planning; Institute for Professional Development; Meritus University; University for the Arts, Sciences, and Communication; Universidad Latinoamericana; University of Phoenix
- Website: www.apollo.edu

Apollo Education Group, Inc. is an American corporation based in the South Phoenix area of Phoenix, Arizona, with an additional corporate office in Chicago, Illinois. It is privately owned by a consortium of investors including The Vistria Group, LLC and funds affiliated with Apollo Global Management, LLC.

== History ==
=== Founding ===
Apollo Education Group, Inc. was founded in 1973 by John Sperling and John D. Murphy.

=== Apollo Group as a Publicly Traded Corporation (1994–2016) ===
Corporate revenues for the year ending August 31, 2005 were $2.251 billion.

In 2008, Apollo Group formed a joint venture with Carlyle Group, called Apollo Global, to make international acquisitions. Apollo also purchased schools in Mexico and Chile

As of 5 October 2011, Apollo Group had a market capitalization of $5.36 billion and a price-to-earnings ratio of 13.22.

==== Declining revenues ====
The Apollo Group announced quarterly results on 30 June 2011. The company reported $1.45 in earnings per share for the previous quarter, exceeding the Thomson Reuters estimate of $1.33 by $0.12. Apollo Group's quarterly revenue was down 7.6% on a year-over-year basis.

In March 2011 the Apollo Group sold its corporate headquarters in Arizona and leased it back in order to raise $170 million in cash. The deal with Cole Real Estate Investments included a 20-year lease requiring Apollo to remain in the complex. "In our view, it does not change the view of the company. Apollo isn't hungry for cash: It carries little debt but generates $4 billion in revenue and has $650 million in net income and $1.5 billion in cash on its balance sheet", commented Peter Wahlstrom of Morningstar, an investment-research company.

Revenue of the company continued to fall: in the fiscal year ending on August 31, 2011, the net revenue was $4.7 billion; in 2012, $4.2 billion; in 2013, $3.6 billion. The operating income during this period fell from $956 million in 2011, to $676 million in 2012, to $427 million in 2013. The company attributed this to a decline in enrollment, with degreed enrollment declining from 380,000 in 2011, to 328,000 in 2012, to 269,000 in 2013.

In 2015, co-founder John D. Murphy argued that Apollo Group "lost its direction when it abandoned its roots, which were serving working adults, not recent high school graduates."

=== Asset under Apollo Global Management (2016–present) ===
On May 6, 2016, the shareholders of the company approved the sale of the firm for $1.14 billion to a group of private investors: Najafi Companies, a Phoenix firm, the New York-based Apollo Global Management and, the Vistria Group of Chicago. The offer amounted to $10 per share, compared to its high of $89/share in 2009. The delisting was completed on February 1, 2017.

The amount of lobbyists for Apollo Education Group was reduced from 27 in 2018, to 18 in 2019, and to 10 in 2021. In 2019, the Apollo Education Group was the third largest higher education funder of lobbyists.

In March 2022, Pearson rejected a £7bn takeover bid from Apollo Global Management.

Anthony W. Miller is Apollo Education Group's chairman.

== Schools and subsidiaries ==
=== University of Phoenix ===
The University of Phoenix was a wholly owned subsidiary of the Apollo Education Group. The University of Phoenix is one of the largest higher education providers in North America. The university has approximately 40 campuses and confers degrees in over 100 degree programs at the associate, bachelor's, master's and doctoral levels. The University of Phoenix has an open enrollment admission policy only requiring a high-school diploma, GED, or an equivalent qualification. The school also provides associate or bachelor's degree applicants opportunity for advanced placement through its prior learning assessment, through which, aside from previous coursework, college credit can come from experiential learning essays, corporate training, and certificates or licenses.

University of Phoenix students owe more than $35 billion in student loan debt, the most of any US college. In 2014, University of Phoenix was highlighted in a Time.com article titled "The 5 Colleges That Leave the Most Students Crippled By Debt".

=== Apollo Global (later known as Vanta Education) ===
Apollo Group formed Apollo Global to manage and form subsidiaries, assets, and holdings overseas. As part of their first acquisitions, Apollo Global acquired University for the Arts, Sciences, and Communication (UNIACC) in Chile as well as the now defunct Meritus University in Canada.

Apollo Global is a joint venture between the Apollo Group and the Carlyle Group. The two partners invested $1 billion in Apollo Global. The Apollo Group invested roughly $801 million and owns 80.1% of the new company. Carlyle invested $199 million and controls the remaining shares. Apollo Global replaced Apollo International.

Apollo Global changed its name to Vanta Education. Its current holdings are BPP, FAEL, Open Colleges, and ULA.

==== BPP Holdings ====
BPP Holdings is a holding company of the United Kingdom-based provider of professional and academic education. The company is divided into BPP Learning Media, BPP Professional Education and BPP University. BPP University is a United Kingdom degree-awarding body with four schools: BPP Business School, BPP Law School, BPP School of Health and BPP School of Foundation and English Language Studies. Apollo Global acquired BPP Holdings (which includes BPP University) in the United Kingdom for $607 million in July 2009.

==== Universidad Latinoamericana, Mexico (sold in 2019) ====
The Universidad Latinoamericana in Mexico was acquired by the Apollo Group in 2007, and sold in 2019

==== Open Colleges, Australia ====
Open Colleges in Australia was acquired for a 70% share agreement by the Apollo Group in 2013.

==== Milpark Education ====
Apollo Group announced in August 2011 a $75 million deal to buy Carnegie Learning along with a separate agreement to acquire related technology from CMU for $21.5 million, to be paid over 10 years.

=== Aptimus Marketing ===
In 2007, Apollo Group purchased Aptimus for $48 million.

Aptimus was a full-service, in-house marketing agency for Apollo Group education institutions, including the University of Phoenix, Axia College, the Institute for Professional Development, Olympus High School, and Insight School.

=== Orange Lutheran Online ===
Lutheran High School of Orange County (LHSOC) licenses its name to the Apollo Group to offer online courses.

== Sold or closed operations ==
=== Meritus University (closed 2011) ===
Apollo Group owned and operated Meritus University in Canada. On January 24, 2011, citing how "enrollment will continue to be insufficient to sustain the required quality academic and student service infrastructure we and our students demand," Meritus University announced its closure, with their last classes taking place on March 14, 2011.

=== Insight Schools (sold 2011) ===
Insight Schools is an online high school offering classes from 9th to 12th grade. Insight both ran high schools for school districts and operated online schools in several U.S. states. Apollo Group acquired Insight Schools in 2007; in 2011 Apollo Group sold Insight Schools to Kaplan, Inc.

=== The Iron Yard (closed 2017) ===
On June 11, 2015, Apollo Education Group acquired a 62% interest in TIY Academy, LLC ("The Iron Yard"), a provider of nondegree information technology bootcamp programs in the United States, for $15.9 million. The Iron Yard subsidiary closed all campuses in 2017 and ceased operations early in 2018.

=== College of Financial Planning (sold 2017) ===
The College of Financial Planning was acquired by Apollo in 1997 and sold to Kaplan in December 2017.

=== Carnegie Learning (sold 2018) ===
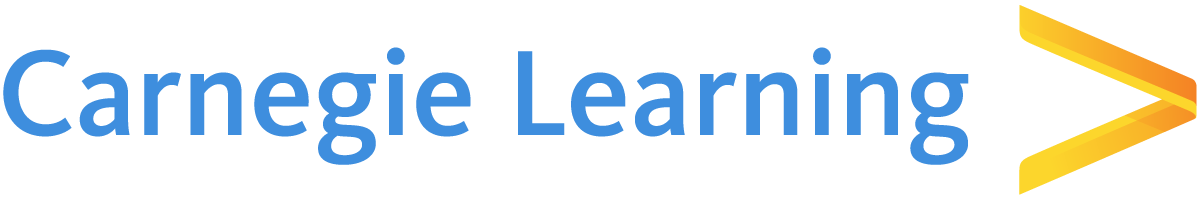
Carnegie Learning Logo

Carnegie Learning is a publisher of math curricula for middle school, high school, and post-secondary students. The company uses a blended approach, with a textbook and software (called Cognitive Tutor) for each subject. The company also produces products for the homeschool and tutoring markets. Based in Pittsburgh, Pennsylvania, Carnegie Learning was founded by cognitive science researchers from Carnegie Mellon University in conjunction with veteran mathematics teachers.

All of the Cognitive Tutor curricula are based on extensive scientific research from Carnegie Mellon University, along with field tests in schools throughout the United States. The Cognitive Tutors are based on the ACT-R theory of learning, memory and performance. The Tutors themselves were developed using an empirical testing process.

=== Western International University (closed, 2019) ===
Western International University (West) was a university offering online and in person classroom programs for adult learners. Founded in 1978, West offered associate, bachelor's and master's degree programs to approximately 1,374 students (Fall 2014). West's mission is to provide a broad educational foundation, with a focus on business and technology, designed to prepare students for leadership positions in a dynamic, global marketplace. West was formerly located in Phoenix, Arizona and was more recently located in Tempe, Arizona. West offered in person classroom teachings and online education. The university started shutting down in March 2017 and developed a two year "teaching out" plan to allow students an opportunity to graduate from West or transfer to another institution. The school ceased all operations and officially closed in February 2019. Western International University was ranked in top 24 schools in USA for adult employed professionals in US News Magazine in past.

== Political affiliations ==
Several American policymakers have been affiliated with Apollo Education. Former secretary of the Department of Education, Margaret Spellings, was at one point a member of the Apollo Group Board of Directors. Jane Oates, a former staffer for Senator Ted Kennedy and the Department of Labor, became the Apollo Group's vice president for external relations in 2013.

== Lawsuits and financial reporting ==
After a separate investigation in 2004, the Apollo Group paid about $10 million in fines to the U.S. Department of Education, which had criticised UoP's admissions practices: for example, recruiters were paid bonuses depending on the numbers they signed up. "In 2004, a scathing report issued by the US Department of Education concluded that Phoenix, as The Chronicle of Higher Education put it, had a 'high-pressure sales culture' that intimidated recruiters who failed to meet targets and encouraged the enrollment of unqualified students—in short that it rewarded 'the recruiters who put the most "asses in classes"'. Apollo illegally withheld the report, but it was leaked and the group's value on the stock market crashed. A suit was brought alleging that its management had 'disseminated materially false and misleading financial statements in an effort to inflate its stock price and attract investors'."

"In 2006, the company's controller and chief accounting officer resigned amid allegations that the books had been cooked; in 2007, the Nasdaq Listing and Hearing Review Council threatened to withdraw Apollo's listing from the stock exchange."

In January 2008, the above stock-price suit was decided. Apollo was found liable for misleading investors by failing to disclose the Department of Education report that criticized the University of Phoenix's recruiting practices. The jury awarded the shareholders $280 million in damages. The trial judge vacated the verdict and found for the defendants, but the Ninth Circuit reinstated the verdict. The U.S. Supreme Court declined to hear Apollo's appeal of the verdict. The case ultimately resolved with Apollo being liable for $145 million; the reported $280 million figure may have been an error because the jury's award was for $5.55 per share.

In November 2008, Apollo paid $1.89 million to settle a religious discrimination class action without admitting wrongdoing. The Equal Employment Opportunity Commission had brought the claim on behalf of non-Mormon employees of University of Phoenix Online. Under the settlement, University of Phoenix Online agreed to prohibit favoritism toward the Church of Jesus Christ of Latter-day Saints.

In July 2015, Apollo announced the Federal Trade Commission (FTC) was investigating UoP for unfair business practices; "The company must hand over documents regarding matters that include its marketing, tuition, billing, accreditation, and military recruitment practices going back as far as 2011." In January 2016, the FTC filed suit against Apollo and University of Phoenix. The court ordered Apollo and UoP to comply with the FTC's civil investigative demands.
