= UNIACC University =

Coordinates: 33.4442°S 70.6229°W

UNIACC

Location
- Av. Salvador 1200; Providencia, Chile

Information
- School type: University
- Established: 1981
- Enrolment: 5,019 (2020)
- Language: Spanish
- Campuses: Central, South, and West
- Slogan: Bienvenido a crear
- Accreditation: 2023
- Website: https://www.uniacc.cl/

University for the Arts, Sciences, and Communication (Spanish: Universidad de las Artes, Ciencias, y Comunicaciones) (UNIACC) is a Chilean university located in Barrio Italia, Providencia, Santiago. It is a nonprofit institution owned by the Apollo Group. It failed to be re-accredited in 2011 on the first try by the Chilean National Accreditation Commission.
