= Valley of the Heart's Delight (film) =

- Directed by: Tim Boxell
- Written by: Miles Murphy
- Produced by: Miles Murphy
- Starring: Gabriel Mann; Bruce McGill; Diana Scarwid; Emily Harrison; Tom Bower; Pete Postlethwaite
- Cinematography: Hiro Narita
- Edited by: Jay Boekelheide
- Music by: Richard Gibbs; Nicholas O'Toole
- Production company: Banana Peel Entertainment
- Distributed by: Indican Pictures
- Release dates: 24 April 2006 (Newport Beach International Film Festival); 25 October 2007 (US)
- Running time: 97 minutes
- Country: United States
- Language: English

Valley of the Heart's Delight is a 2006 American historical drama film directed by Tim Boxell, starring Gabriel Mann, Bruce McGill, Diana Scarwid, Emily Harrison, Tom Bower and Pete Postlethwaite. The film is a fictionalized version of the abduction and murder of Brooke Hart and the lynching of Thomas Harold Thurmond and John M. Holmes.

== Cast ==
- Gabriel Mann as Jack Pacheco
- Bruce McGill as Horace Walsh
- Diana Scarwid as Natalie Walsh
- Emily Harrison as Helen Walsh
- Tom Bower as Sheriff Ackle
- Pete Postlethwaite as Albion Munson
- Ron Roggé as Deputy Dully
- Val Diamond as Sylvia Daumier
- Ed Holmes as Gov. Brodie
- David Barth as Raplh Rutz
- Cully Fredricksen as Agent Tucker
- Howard Swain as Bill Vente
- Robert Kennedy as James Sullivan
- Ralph Miller as Tom Stanton
- Robert Ernst as Ernest Maloney
- Rod Gnapp as Harlan Grasso
- Phil Stockton as Mr. Brewster
- Ralph Peduto as Vegetable Man
- Nick Scoggin as Organizer Two
- Omar Avila as Prisoner
- Carl Bressler as Harold Berg
- Corey Fischer as Frightened Man
- Eric Toms as College Man #1

== Release ==
The film opened on 26 October 2007 in San Jose, California.

== Reception ==
Dennis Harvey of Variety wrote, "Pedestrian handling, a clumsy script and some poor acting from name and local thesps alike squander the story’s potential."

Jud Cost of Magnet called the direction "amateurish" and "hamfisted", the script "lousy" and "cliche-ridden", the cinematography "murky", and the editing "random". Cost also criticised the performances of Mann and Harrison.
