= Martin Jones =

Martin Jones may refer to:

- Martin Jones (ice hockey) (born 1990), Canadian ice hockey goaltender
- Martin Jones (pianist) (born 1940), English concert pianist
- Martin Furnival Jones (1913–1997), Director General of MI5, the United Kingdom's internal security service, 1965–1972
- Martin Jones (cricketer) (born 1985), English cricketer
- Martin Jones (runner) (born 1967), British runner
- Martin Jones (field hockey), British field hockey player
- Ruth Martin-Jones (born 1947), British long jumper and heptathlete

== See also ==
- Marty Jones (born 1953), English professional wrestler
- Martyn Jones (disambiguation)
