= List of University of Phoenix alumni =

This list of University of Phoenix alumni includes notable graduates.

== Business ==
Name	Class year(s)	Degree(s)	Notability	Reference
Peter Sperling		MBA	Former chairman of Apollo Education Group, owner of the University of Phoenix	

== Government, law, and public policy ==
Name	Class year(s)	Degree(s)	Notability	Reference
Celina Caesar-Chavannes	2005	MBA	Member of Parliament of Canada for Whitby (Liberal, then Independent); memoirist; businessperson	
Marlon Coleman	2012	MBA	Mayor of Muskogee, Oklahoma	
Brad Dee	1991	M.S.	Representative (R) in the Utah House of Representatives	
Eric Dick	2005	B.S.	Attorney and politician	
Dan Huberty	1998	MBA	Republican member of the Texas House of Representatives from Harris County; former trustee and president of the Humble Independent School District	
Harold Hurtt	1991	M.S.	Director of U.S. Immigration and Customs Enforcement	
Joyce Lawrence		MBA	Republican member of the Colorado House of Representatives	
Gervin Miyamoto	2000	M.A.	United States marshal for the District of Hawaii	
Mary Peters		B.S.	15th U.S. secretary of transportation	
Marni Sawicki		Master of Business Administration	Mayor of Cape Coral, Florida (2013–2017)	
Howard Schmidt		BSBA; MAOM	Cyber-Security coordinator of the Obama administration	

== Journalism and media ==
Name	Class year(s)	Degree(s)	Notability	Reference
Christina Brown		B.S.	MSNBC anchor and a host of NBC's Early Today	
Conrade Gamble			Actor and stuntman	

== Law enforcement ==
Name	Class year(s)	Degree(s)	Notability	Reference
Brian Sicknick	2013	B.S.	U.S. Capitol Police officer killed in the 2021 United States Capitol attack	

== Military ==
Name	Class year(s)	Degree(s)	Notability	Reference
Harold Brown Jr.		MBA	CIA officer and U.S. Army Reserve major who was killed during the Camp Chapman attack	
Kirkland H. Donald	1991	MBA	U.S. Navy admiral	
Steven Ferrari	2000	B.S.	US Army major general	
Lisa M. Franchetti	1998	M.S.	U.S. Navy chief of Naval Operations	
Daryl Caudle	2010	DMgt	U.S. Navy chief of Naval Operations	

== Sports ==
Name	Class year(s)	Degree(s)	Notability	Reference
Nick Buchert	2012	B.S.	NBA referee	
Omar Easy	2010	MBA	Former National Football League running back and vice-principal of Everett High School	
Larry Fitzgerald	2016	B.A.	Drafted third overall in the 2004 football draft while a sophomore in college	
Paul Goldschmidt	2013	B.S.	Major League Baseball player	
Lisa Leslie	2009	MBA	Three-time WNBA MVP; four-time Olympic gold medal winner	
Shaquille O'Neal	2005	MBA	Three-time NBA Finals MVP and fifteen-time NBA All-Star	
Michael Russell	2012	B.S.	World top-100 tennis player	
Darrell Sherman	2010; 2013	B.S. M.S.	Professional baseball player in Major League Baseball and the Mexican League	

== Notes ==
- Blank cells indicate missing information.
