= University of Phoenix =

American for-profit university

Coordinates: 33.402339°N 111.966163°W

- Seal
- Motto: Career Services for Life
- Type: Private for-profit university
- Established: 1976; 50 years ago
- Founders: John Sperling; John D. Murphy
- Parent institution: Phoenix Education Partners
- Accreditation: HLC
- President: Chris Lynne
- Academic staff: 2,300 (2025)
- Total staff: 3,400 (2025)
- Students: 78,900 (2024)
- Undergraduates: 64,100 (2024)
- Postgraduates: 14,800 (2024)
- Location: Phoenix, Arizona, U.S.
- Campus: Online, 1 physical campus
- Colors: Proprietary shades of red and platinum
- Website: phoenix.edu
- Type: Public
- Traded as: NYSE: PXED
- Headquarters: Phoenix, Arizona, United States

The University of Phoenix (UoPX) is a private for-profit university headquartered in Phoenix, Arizona, United States. (Note: As of 2022, all campuses but the headquarters in Phoenix are no longer accepting new students.) Founded in 1976, the university confers certificates and degrees at the certificate, associate, bachelor's, master's, and doctoral degree levels. It is institutionally accredited by the Higher Learning Commission and has an open enrollment admissions policy for many undergraduate programs. The school is owned by Phoenix Education Partners.

== History ==
=== Foundation and rapid growth (1970s–2000s) ===
The University of Phoenix was founded in 1976 by John Sperling and John D. Murphy. In 1980, it expanded to San Jose, California, and launched its online program in 1989. Much of UoPX's revenue came from employers who were subsidizing the higher education of their managers. Academic labor underwent a process of unbundling, in which "various components of the traditional faculty role (e.g., curriculum design) are divided among different entities, while others (e.g., research) are eliminated altogether".

In 1994, UoPX leaders made the parent company, Apollo Group, public. Its enrollment exceeded 100,000 students by 1999. Senator Tom Harkin, who chaired hearings on for-profit colleges, said, "I think what really turned this company is when they started going to Wall Street." The sentiment was echoed by Murphy in his book Mission Forsaken: The University of Phoenix Affair with Wall Street. In 2004, Murphy thought that "the University of Phoenix abandoned its founding mission of solely serving working adult learners to admit virtually anyone with a high school diploma or GED." In terms of revenue, UoPX began to rely less on corporate assistance and more on government funding. In 2007, The New York Times reported that the school's graduation rate had plummeted and that educational quality had eroded.

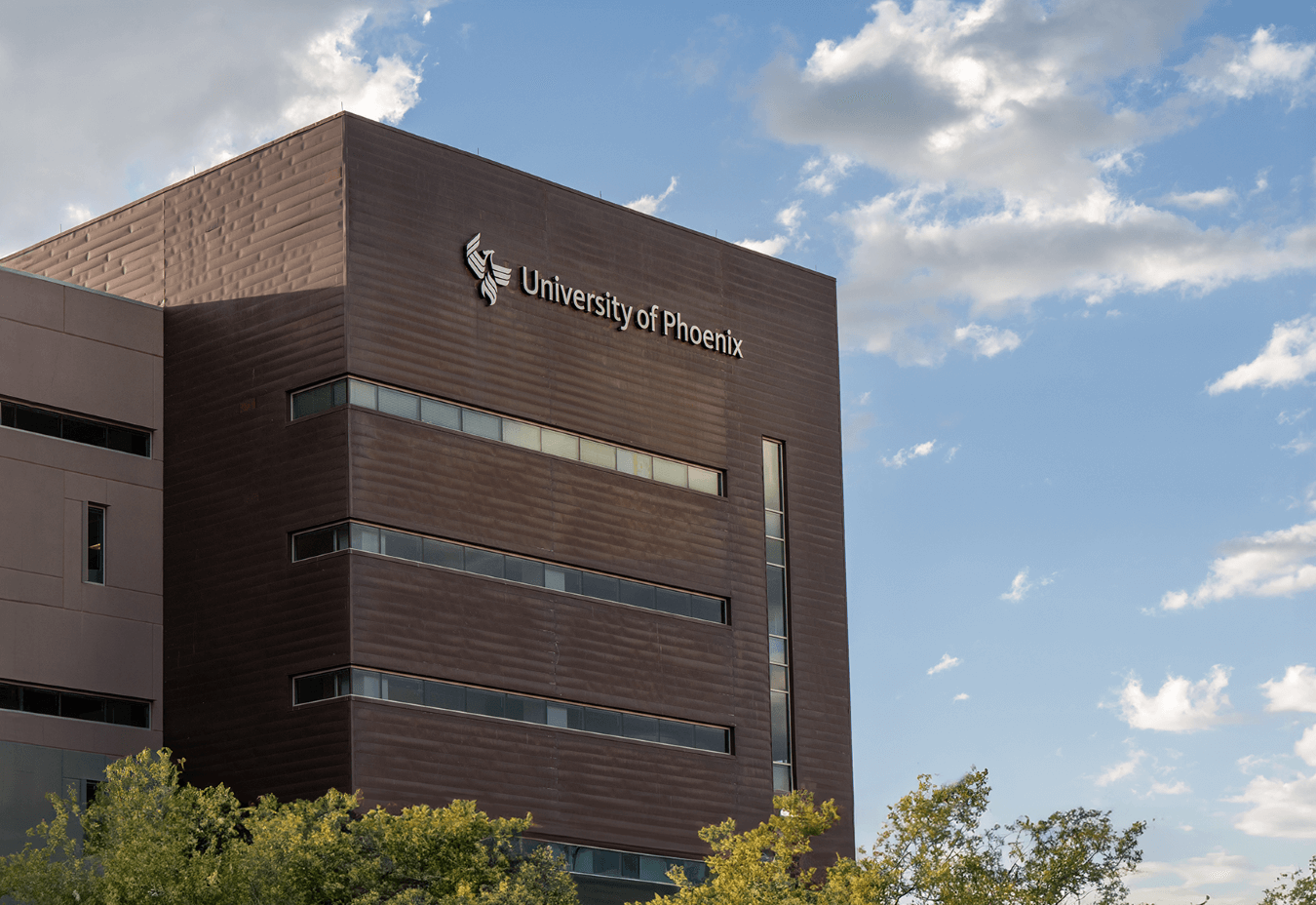
A physical location of the University of Phoenix.

In 2008, Pereira O'Dell became the lead ad agency for UoPX for a reported $220 million. During the 2008–2009 fiscal year, the UoPX student body received more Pell Grant money ($656.9 million) than any other university and was the top recipient of student financial aid funds, receiving almost $2.48 billion. The university's graduation rate was 17 percent, according to federal data that measures first-time, full-time (FTFT) undergraduate students who complete their programs at 150% of the normal time. The University of Phoenix has been the largest recipient of federal G.I. Bill tuition benefits and the largest for-profit recipient by Pell Grant assistance funding.

In 2009, the Department of Education produced a report claiming the untimely return of unearned Title IV funds for more than 10 percent of sampled students. The report also expressed concern that some students register and begin attending classes before completely understanding the implications of enrollment, including their eligibility for student financial aid. In January 2010, the parent company Apollo Group was required to post a letter of credit for $125 million by January 30 of the same year. In 2010, UoPX came under government scrutiny after its Phoenix and Philadelphia campuses were found to have engaged in deceptive enrollment practices and fraudulent solicitation of FAFSA funds.

=== Enrollment decline, transition to online courses (2010s) ===
In 2010, UoPX claimed a peak enrollment of more than 470,000 students with a revenue of $4.95 billion. A 2010 report found that its online graduation rate at the time was only five percent. Later in the year, the university paid $154.5 million for 20-year naming rights for advertising purposes of the University of Phoenix Stadium in Glendale, Arizona. The company terminated the naming rights deal on April 11, 2017, and on September 4, 2018, the stadium's naming rights were acquired by State Farm.

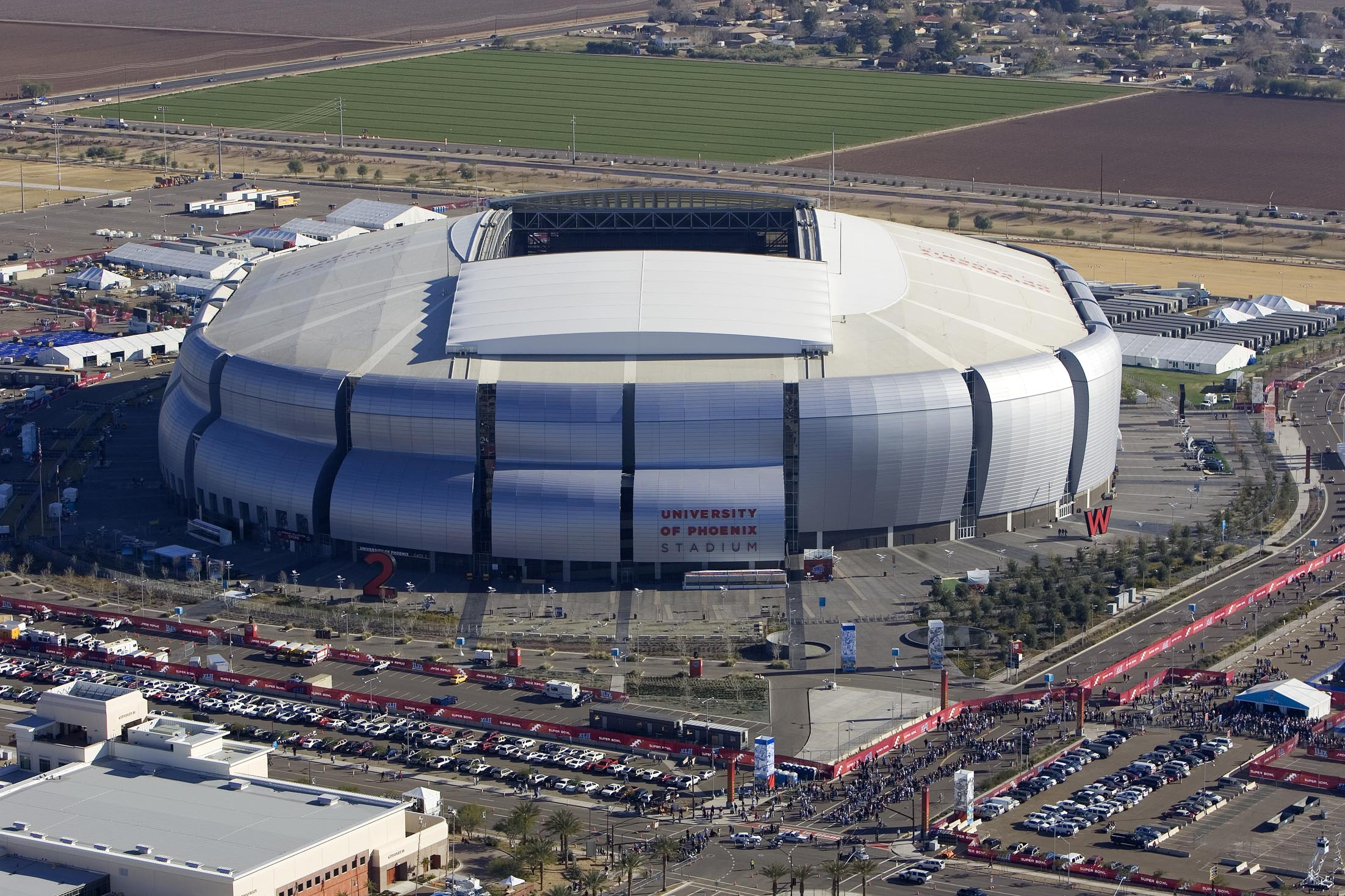
State Farm Stadium, formerly University of Phoenix Stadium, a sports stadium in Glendale, Arizona for which the corporation owned naming rights from 2006 to 2018.

In a December 2010 Bloomberg article, former UoPX senior vice president Robert W. Tucker noted that "at critical junctures, [co-founder] John [Sperling] chose growth over academic integrity, which ultimately diminished a powerful educational model". At its peak, UoPX operated more than 500 campuses and learning sites. The university began to focus on opening new resource centers for online students to provide spaces for alumni to network and current students to seek assistance from professors and peers.

In August 2011, Apollo Group announced it would buy 100% of Carnegie Learning to accelerate its efforts to incorporate adaptive learning into its academic platform. Controversies concerned its marketing and recruitment practices, instructional hours, its status as one of the top recipients of student aid, and a student body carrying the most student debt of any college.

In 2013, the Department of Defense ended its contract with the University of Phoenix for military bases in Europe. U.S. military commanders at Fort Campbell, Kentucky, allowed UoPX representatives to advertise and place promotional materials in high-traffic areas. Access was provided in exchange for the university funding events on army bases, including Easter egg hunts and welcome briefings for newly assigned soldiers.

Murphy wrote in Mission Forsaken (2013) about the school's degeneration from a provider of working adult continuing education programs to a money making machine whose sole criterion for admission was eligibility for federally funded student loans.

In May 2013, the university's accreditation status was placed on "notice" for a period of two years (with allowed retention of their regional accreditation) by the HLC, due to "insufficient autonomy relative to its parent corporation". The HLC Institutional Actions Council First Committee (IACFC) concerns centered on the university's governance, student assessment, and faculty scholarship in relation to Ph.D. programs. In June 2015, the HLC determined that the University of Phoenix had resolved those concerns.

In 2014, UoPX partnered with 47 historically black colleges and universities to offer UoPX classes that transfer to these institutions. 142,500 students enrolled on August 31, 2016, and 119,938 during the 2016–17 school year. During this time, the university continued to spend tens of millions of dollars on marketing and advertising, including $27 million on internet paid search advertising. The Brookings Institution reported that UoPX spent $76 million on advertising in 2017.

From 2009 to 2015, the University of Phoenix received an estimated $1.2 billion of federal money issued through the G.I. Bill. The university enrolled almost 50,000 such students in 2014, twice as many as any other institution.

In 2015, MarketWatch reported that UoPX students owed more than $35 billion in student loan debt, the most of any US college at the time.

In 2016, the University of Phoenix partnered with the ASIS Foundation to provide scholarships for students studying for security-related degrees. In March 2016, the first ten scholarship recipients were announced. The University of Phoenix also has community partnerships with Boys and Girls Clubs of America, the American Red Cross, and the Junior League.

In 2016, Apollo Education Group shareholders filed a class-action lawsuit against the corporation, arguing that it withheld information leading to large losses in stock prices. Several of the allegations related to UoPX's recruiting of military personnel and veterans.

Between 2010 and 2016, enrollment declined by more than 70 percent amid multiple investigations, lawsuits, and controversies. In 2016, a Brookings Institution study estimated the University of Phoenix's five-year student loan default rate at 47 percent.

=== Ownership by Apollo Global Management (2016–2025) ===
In February 2016, Apollo Group announced its sale to a private investment group comprising Apollo Global Management, the Vistria Group, and the Najafi Companies, for $1 billion. Former U.S. Department of Education deputy secretary Anthony W. Miller, partner and chief operating officer of Vistria, became chairman. The sale was approved by both the Department of Education and the Higher Learning Commission (HLC). In December 2016, the U.S. Department of Education approved of the sale of Apollo Education Group to Apollo Global Management. The company provided a letter of credit for up to $385 million. In February 2017, after the takeover by Apollo Global Management, UoPX laid off 170 full-time faculty members. According to the 2019 academic report, degreed enrollment was 87,400.

In 2020, UoPX received $6.5 million in CARES Act funding and $7.4 million in the second round of COVID-19 relief funds. In 2020, UoPX began experimenting with micro-campuses, giving the centers a "WeWork vibe".

In 2021, Bloomberg reported that Apollo's higher education investment had gained about 50 percent in value: from its $634 million initial investment to $956 million. UoPX also received $3.4 million in aid through the American Rescue Plan.

In 2021, UoPX continued to close campuses, including Atlanta and Salt Lake City. The Phoenix, Arizona campus was the only location accepting new in-person students. UoPX would later announce that only one campus would remain open in 2025.

On September 20, 2023, the Biden administration canceled nearly $37 million of federal student loan debt for more than 1,200 borrowers who were enrolled at the University of Phoenix between September 21, 2012, and December 31, 2014.

Through the 2023-24 school year, UoPX was the largest for-profit university based on the number of students taking classes for credit, having 156,956 students enrolled under that qualifier. In 2024, UoPX published a survey of its students that found 83% of respondents were satisfied or very satisfied with their online learning. The university attributed a decrease in enrollment over the past years to the elimination of struggling programs and the de-emphasis of associate degrees.

=== Phoenix Education Partners, IPO (2025–present) ===
On August 29, 2025, AP VIII Queso Holdings LP, the new parent company of the University of Phoenix, filed for an initial public offering. The company announced that its name would change to Phoenix Education Partners Inc. before the closing of the offering. The entity began to be traded under the ticker symbol PXED. Phoenix Education Partners received backing from Apollo Global Management.

Prior to its IPO, multiple acquisition proposals were made for the University of Phoenix since 2021, including those by Tuskegee University, UMass Global, the University of Arkansas System, and the University of Idaho. The University of Idaho initially announced a deal worth $685 million to acquire the University of Phoenix in May 2023. Idaho Attorney General Raúl Labrador sued the Idaho State Board of Education, due to alleged violations of Idaho's Open Meetings Law, pausing the acquisition. The lawsuit was first dismissed and later appealed, continuing until the case was eventually dropped due to the decision to abandon the purchase in June 2025. The University of Phoenix reimbursed the University of Idaho for legal fees related to exploring the purchase and paid an additional $15 million to the school for seeking an IPO.

Through its IPO, Phoenix Education raised $136 million, giving the university a market value of $1.48 billion. The offering was oversubscribed, with demand reaching roughly ten times the supply of available shares. Additionally, Phoenix's IPO was among the last to receive SEC approval prior to the 2025 United States federal government shutdown.

== Academics ==
UoPX has an open admissions policy by which most of its undergraduate programs are accessible to anyone with a high school diploma, GED, or their equivalent. According to the US Department of Education's College Navigator, the current student to teacher ratio at the University of Phoenix is 132 to 1. Additionally, according to the university's 2023 annual academic report, more than 78% of its students are employed while attending the school.

Prior to 2010, the university recruited students using high-pressure sales tactics, including assertions that classes were filling fast, by admissions counselors who are paid, in part, based on their success in recruiting students. The university recruits students and obtains financial aid on their behalf, such as the Academic Competitiveness Grant, Federal Pell Grant, National Science & Mathematics Access to Retain Talent Grant (National SMART Grant), Federal Direct Student Loan Program, Federal Supplemental Educational Opportunity Grant, Federal Direct PLUS Loans, Federal Perkins Loan, and the Wounded Warrior Project. In the 2017–18 award year, 51,990 UoPX students received the Federal Pell Grant.

Besides postsecondary degree-level programs, the school offers continuing education courses for teachers and practitioners, professional development courses for companies, and specialized courses of study for military personnel. Students spend 20 to 24 hours with an instructor during each course, and are required to collaborate on learning team projects.

Students have access to class-specific online resources, which include an electronic library of textbooks and other course materials. Some academics and former students argue the abbreviated courses and the use of learning teams result in an inferior education. UoPX has been criticized for lack of academic rigor; Henry M. Levin called its business degree an "MBA Lite", saying "I've looked at [its] course materials. It's a very low level of instruction." The university's "corporate articulation agreements" provide an alternative assessment program for people working at other companies to earn college credit for training they have completed at their jobs. To qualify for college credit, students either write an "experiential essay" or create a professional training portfolio, the latter of which is a collection of documents such as transcripts from other schools, certificates, licenses, workshops or seminars.

The University of Phoenix has been regionally accredited since 1978 by the HLC. UoPX has 18 programs with business, healthcare, nursing, counseling and education having programmatic or specialized accreditation. Some individual colleges within the University of Phoenix hold specialty accreditation or are pre-accredited by accrediting agencies that are recognized by the Council for Higher Education Accreditation.

- School of Business – accreditation through the Accreditation Council for Business Schools and Programs (ACBSP) including an Associate of Arts with a concentration in accounting or business fundamentals, a Bachelor of Science in business, a Master of Business Administration and a Doctor of Management. Because UoPX's business programs are not accredited by the Association to Advance Collegiate Schools of Business (AACSB), some companies will not provide tuition reimbursement for employees attending the university.
- College of Education – Master of Arts in Education for Elementary, Secondary and Special Education as well as a Master of Arts in Administration and Supervision is accredited by the Teacher Education Accreditation Council.
- College of Nursing – B.S. and M.S. degree programs are accredited by the Commission on Collegiate Nursing Education. Graduates are eligible to take the National Council Licensure Examination, which is required in order to become a practicing registered nurse. Degrees in programs for medical, public health and health administration professionals are accredited by the Commission on Accreditation of Healthcare Management Education iMaster of Health Administration.
- College of Social Sciences – The Master of Science in Counseling program in Community Counseling (Phoenix and Tucson campuses only), the Master of Science in Counseling program in Mental Health Counseling (Utah campuses only), and the Master of Science in Counseling program in Clinical Mental Health Counseling (Phoenix and Tucson campuses only) are accredited by the Council for Accreditation of Counseling and Related Educational Programs.

In October 2025, the University of Phoenix released TransferPath, a mobile app that allows individuals to upload transcripts and preview how prior college credits may transfer into its degree programs. The university supports credit evaluation from over 5,000 accredited institutions and allows up to 87 transferable credits. It was introduced alongside the university’s existing Transfer Student Guide.

In 2026, the University of Phoenix was ranked 96th in Health Care Management, 301st in Psychology, and 266th in Best Public Affairs Programs by the U.S. News & World Report under the category of "Best Grad Schools".

=== Students ===
According to the College Scorecard in 2019, the University of Phoenix student body's ethnic composition was 39 percent unknown, 26 percent white, 20 percent black, 11 percent Hispanic, 2 percent multiracial, with 1 percent each for Asian, American Indian/Alaska Native and Native Hawaiian/Pacific Islander as of July 2022.

The 2020 Academic Annual Report for UoPX indicated women make up two-thirds of the student body, the average student age is 37, and more than 83 percent of its students are employed while in school. The 2020 report also noted that 21% of the student body were affiliated with the military, of which 41% are women. 26% of 2020 graduates were military-affiliated graduates.

In November 2020, the College Navigator listed the University of Phoenix's overall graduation rate at 15 percent.

According to the College Scorecard in 2021, of student debtors two years into repayment, 32 percent were in forbearance, 28 percent were not making progress, 13 percent were in deferment, 11 percent defaulted, 7 percent were making progress, 5 percent were delinquent, 2 percent were paid in full, and 1 percent were discharged.

In 2020–21, 1,316 students used Department of Defense Tuition Assistance and 7,380 students used G.I. Bill funds. The University of Phoenix has been a partner of U.S. Army University and has had a presence at a few military bases.

According to Phoenix Education Partners' S-1 filing in 2025, the average age of a University of Phoenix student was 37 years old. Data from the University’s 2024 fiscal year in the filing showed that 76% of students were employed while enrolled, 95% of new students were over the age of 22, 64% cared for dependents at home, and 61% were first-generation college students. Among students who completed an optional survey, 62% identified as members of a minority group. Overall, 71% of the student population was female.

== Ownership and leadership ==
UoPX is a subsidiary of Phoenix Education Partners, which has received backing from Apollo Global Management and Vistria Group. The president is Chris Lynne and the chief academic officer is John Woods. Lynne previously worked at Arthur Andersen, Education Management Corporation, Northcentral University, and HotChalk. Woods has a PhD in higher education administration from Bowling Green State University.

=== Faculty ===
The institution depends almost entirely on contingent faculty: about 97 percent of Phoenix instructors teach part-time, compared to 47 percent nationwide. This reliance on part-time faculty has been criticized by regulators and academic critics. Most of the classes are centrally crafted and standardized to ensure consistency and to maximize profits. No faculty members get tenure. Adjuncts earn approximately $1000–$2000 per course. Approximately 21 cents of every tuition dollar is spent on instruction.

According to the Integrated Postsecondary Education Data System, the student to faculty ratio is 132 to 1 in the Arizona segment. The university reported 76 full-time and 3,143 part-time faculty in its Arizona segment; full-time faculty make up 2 percent of the total faculty.

== See also ==
- List of University of Phoenix alumni
- Litigation and controversies of the University of Phoenix
