= Ralph Peduto =

American dramatist

- Born: March 9, 1942; Jersey City, New Jersey, US
- Died: May 12, 2014 (aged 72); Santa Cruz, California, US
- Occupations: Actor, Playwright
- Years active: 1984–2012
- Spouse: Laura Peduto

Ralph Peduto (March 9, 1942 – May 12, 2014) was an American actor, playwright, writer and director. Peduto's film roles included Mrs. Doubtfire in 1993, The Rock in 1996, and Patch Adams in 1998, while his television credits included guest spots in Cheers and Hill Street Blues. He ultimately appeared in more than 100 film and television roles, as forty television commercials. An acting teacher as well as an actor, Peduto founded Acting On Camera, an acting school in Santa Cruz, California.

== Life and career ==
Peduto was born on March 9, 1942, in Jersey City, New Jersey, to a working-class Italian American family. He was the eldest of three children of James and Helen Peduto. He attended James J. Ferris High School and graduated from William L. Dickinson High School in Jersey City (He was later inducted into Dickinson's Hall of Fame in 2000). Peduto enlisted in the U.S. Army and was stationed in South Korea during the Vietnam War era. He then attended Rutgers University after returning to the United States.

In 1973, Peduto moved from New Jersey to the Monterey Bay Area to accept a broadcasting position at KRML, an AM radio station in Carmel, California. He first began acting at Cabrillo College. He soon wrote and produced theater plays at Cabrillo, including "Root Rock," his autobiographical musical which debuted in 1979.

Peduto transitioned to roles in Hollywood films, television shows and commercials during the 1980s. He appeared in television and films from the 1980s to the 2000s. Peduto also had an extensive career in television commercials. His best known commercial work was as the "Midas Man", a character and spokesman for the Midas automotive centers, in which he urged consumers to depend on Midas.

Peduto was a longtime resident of Capitola, California.

Ralph Peduto died on May 12, 2014, just twelve days after being diagnosed with leukemia, at the age of 72. He was survived by his wife of 45 years, Laura Peduto, and their two children, Maro Peduto and Oceanna Ceja.

== Filmography ==
Year	Title	Role	Notes
1989	True Believer	Court Officer	
1993	Mrs. Doubtfire	Cop	
1994	Getting Even with Dad	Chapman	
1996	The Rock	F.B.I. Agent Hunt	
1997	Metro	Bail Bondsman Hawkins	
1997	Lego Island	Papa Brickolini	Video game, voice role
1998	Patch Adams	Organizer	
1999	Paradise Cove	Banner	
2000	Just One Night	Driver 1	
2003	Kung Phooey	Ralph	
2006	Valley of the Heart's Delight	Vegetable Man	
2006	Car Babes	Uncle Steve	
2011	Blur	Halleck	
2012	The Forger	Churchgoer	(final film role)
