= Global Banking School =

British private higher education provider

- Type: Private higher education institution
- Established: 2010
- Founder: Dr Vishwajeet Rana
- Affiliations: Bath Spa University; Canterbury Christ Church University; Oxford Brookes University; University of Suffolk; Leeds Trinity University; Pearson College London
- Chairman: Professor Mary Malcolm
- Vice-Chancellor: James Kennedy (CEO)
- Governing body: Board of Directors
- Students: 35,000 (2025)
- Location: London, England, United Kingdom
- Campus: London, Birmingham, Leeds, Manchester
- Language: English
- Website: https://globalbanking.ac.uk/

Global Banking School (shortly known as GBS) is a private British higher education provider founded in 2010, specialising in vocational and degree-level programmes in fields such as business, finance, and health and social care. It operates ten campuses across London, Birmingham, Leeds, and Manchester, enrolling over 35,000 students as of 2025.

GBS is registered with the Office for Students and delivers validated degrees in partnership with UK universities, including Bath Spa University, Canterbury Christ Church University, Oxford Brookes University, University of Suffolk, and Leeds Trinity University.

In the 2023 Teaching Excellence Framework, GBS received an overall Bronze rating, with Silver for student experience and Bronze for student outcomes.

== History ==
Global Banking School was established in 2010 by Dr. Vishwajeet Rana as a specialist training centre focused on finance and investment banking, offering short courses to equip students with practical skills for financial sector careers. The founding mission was to make higher education accessible to individuals from diverse backgrounds, particularly those who might not pursue traditional university routes, viewing education as a transformative force for individuals and communities.

In 2016, GBS opened its first campus on Bow Road in East London, targeting economically deprived areas to expand access for underrepresented groups. The institution broadened its portfolio through partnerships with UK universities, extending beyond finance to include business management, construction management, digital technologies, health and social care, project management, and psychology.

Key milestones:

- 2019: Launch of strategic partnerships with the University of Suffolk, Leeds Trinity University, and Pearson; expansion to Birmingham (Fazeley Studios) and Manchester.
- 2023: Awarded Bronze in the Teaching Excellence Framework, silver for Student Experience.
- 2024: Opening of new campuses at Wellington Place (Leeds) and Brindleyplace (Birmingham).
- 2025: Plans to expand Manchester campus by 55,000 sq ft at Universal Square.

By 2025, GBS marked its 15th anniversary, operating independently under its Board of Directors within the GEDU Group, with no changes in ownership since its founding. Students have consistently achieved high satisfaction in the National Student Survey, exceeding sector averages in teaching and academic support.

== Academic programmes ==
GBS offers programmes in business and finance, construction management, digital technologies and computing, health and social care, project management, and psychology. Qualifications include:

- Higher National Diploma (HND): 2 years
- Bachelor's Degree: 4 years
- Bachelor's Degree (Level 6 Top-Up): 1 year
- Master's Degree: 1 year

All instruction is in English. Degrees are validated by partner universities and awarding bodies such as Pearson, ensuring recognition under UK higher education standards.

== Partnerships and accreditations ==
GBS collaborates with:

- Bath Spa University
- Canterbury Christ Church University
- Pearson
- Oxford Brookes University
- University of Suffolk
- Leeds Trinity University

These partnerships validate undergraduate and postgraduate degrees. GBS is registered with the Office for Students, and its programmes meet quality standards through these affiliations.

== Leadership and structure ==
The governing body is the Board of Directors, chaired by Professor Mary Malcolm, with members including CEO James Kennedy (Executive Director), Professor Ray Lloyd (Non-Executive Director), Sunita Kotta (Executive Director), Ari Erdenetsogt (Non-Executive Director), and Dr. Vishwajeet Rana (Non-Executive Director). Key academic leaders include:

Deans of Faculties include: Dr. Alli Jones (Bath Spa), Dr. Diane Bray (Canterbury Christ Church), Odette Carew (Leeds Trinity), Colin Bladen Kopacz (Oxford Brookes), Sunita Kotta (Pearson), and Tracy Maule (Suffolk).

== Campuses and facilities ==
GBS operates ten campuses in the UK:

- London: Greenford, Republic – Canary Wharf, GEDU House – Stratford, Cam Road – Stratford, Bow Road
- Birmingham: Norfolk House, Brindleyplace
- Manchester: Universal Square
- Leeds: St George House, Wellington Place

No international campuses exist. Facilities include libraries, digital resource centres, study spaces, computer labs, careers hubs, and 24/7 digital library access.

== Career services and social impact ==
GBS provides one-to-one career advice, work placements, volunteering, Employability Awards, a Careers and Placement Hub, and an alumni network. Community initiatives include partnerships with Lions Club of Heston (urban garden, October 2025), Greenford Quays United Cricket Club (August 2025), NEO Cricket Club (June 2025), a panel on inclusive workplaces (April 2025), International Women's Day events (February 2025), the Breaking Down Barriers report launch in Parliament (May 2024), and Black History Month workshops (October 2025). GBS hosts Industrial Advisory Boards in each city where it operates (London, Birmingham, Leeds and Manchester).
