= Martyn W Jones =

British academic

Professor Martyn Woodley Jones is a British academic, currently serving as Chancellor of BPP University and Director General of UCFB in the UK.

Jones is Head of Quality and Standards at the Association of MBAs, where he has chaired more than 250 international peer review assessment panels.

== Academic career ==
Jones served as Deputy Vice-Chancellor of Kingston University London from 2014 to 2024, and was previously Pro Vice-Chancellor between 2007 and 2014. From 2003 to 2007 he was Dean of Kent Business School at the University of Kent. He had earlier been Dean of the Business School at Aberystwyth University from 1999 to 2003, and MBA Director at Cranfield School of Management in the 1990s.

== Military service ==
Before entering academia, Jones served as an officer in the British Army. Following jungle training in Borneo, he commanded a regiment in Germany and attained the rank of colonel before leaving the service.

== Government and policy work ==
Jones advised the UK government during the early stages of planning for the 1997 transfer of sovereignty over Hong Kong, briefing Prime Minister Margaret Thatcher. He also contributed to US and UK nuclear weapons policy discussions under Vice President Dan Quayle.

== Other activities ==
Jones is an adviser to the House of Lords on educational policy.
