= Kenny Imafidon =

British author and journalist

Kenny Imafidon MBE (born 1993) is an author, journalist and the co-founder of research company Clearview Research. Clearview specialises in projects focusing on diverse and under represented communities. In 2015, he was described by Huffington Post UK as a "young rising star making waves in UK politics".

== Early life ==
Imafidon was born in Peckham, South London in 1993 of Nigerian heritage and brought up with his brother George by his mother. He did well at school but admits to making money from dealing cannabis, saying “The weed was high quality, which meant demand was also high. Before long, my phone was ringing nonstop. There was no time to eat, barely time to sleep… My customer service was flawless, I prided myself on it, in fact.”

== Criminal charges and acquittal ==
In 2011, Imafidon was arrested and charged with one count of murder, two of both attempted murder and grievous bodily harm, and possession of a firearm and an offensive weapon. There was no evidence of any direct involvement, but he was charged under joint enterprise laws, in effect guilty by association with other suspects. He was denied bail and spent six months in jail before a judge freed him determining that there was no case to answer.

Imafidon completed his A Levels whilst on remand in Feltham Prison, becoming the first person in the UK to sit and pass the exams in these circumstances.

== Career ==
Between 2011 and 2012, Imafidon found intern positions and gradually built up contacts. He won the Amos Bursary to study law at BPP University.

In 2014, Imafidon was awarded the number one position of Rare Rising Stars.

He established his career by co-founding Clearview Research in 2018 and has worked with companies like Uber, Tinder and Deliveroo, on voter registration campaigns for young people in UK elections. He has written about this for The Guardian.

Imafidon is a trustee of various charities such as BBC Children in Need (he undertook a review on racism for them), Strength Within in Me Foundation (S.W.I.M), Spark Inside, and City Gateway, where he is currently the chair of the board of trustees.

He led on the £1 million Skill Up Step Up campaign, with funding from Barclays LifeSkills, funding to City Gateway and other charities to support unemployed young Londoners towards sustainable jobs or apprenticeships.

In 2021, a six-way bidding war took place amongst publishers seeking to publish Imafidon's memoir. Imafidon was represented by The Good Literary Agency and signed with Transworld. The memoir, That Peckham Boy, were published by Penguin in 2023. Bear Grylls said "Kenny's story shows us that we all have the potential to achieve extraordinary things. What a hero."
