= Legal Cheek =

British legal news website

- Website type: Legal news
- Owner: Alex Aldridge
- Website: www.legalcheek.com
- Commercial: Yes
- Launched: 2011
- Current status: Active

Legal Cheek is a British legal news website. It also has a careers section featuring research about law firms and barrister chambers and a large following on social media.

== History ==
Founded by former Guardian journalist Alex Aldridge in 2011, Legal Cheek initially operated out of Aldridge's apartment in London. Aldridge has a background in law after training as a barrister.

In 2012, Legal Cheek was forced to issue an apology for using an incorrect photo in an article about a dispute between two barristers. In an interview after this had taken place, Aldridge admitted there had been a "lawsuit" and pledged to think harder about "accountability".

In 2014, Legal Cheek conducted the first ever interview with Judge Rinder, the barrister who would go on to find fame on Strictly Come Dancing.

Legal Cheek has been cited in UK media, including the BBC, The Independent and The Telegraph.

As of 2026, Legal Cheek's editor is Tom Connelly who oversees the editorial team. Legal Cheek has grown steadily over the last decade and now has at least nine staffers as well as several regular freelance contributors.

== Careers advice ==
Since its founding in 2011, Legal Cheek has become one of the largest careers advice websites in the UK. The Firms Most List, Chambers Most List, and Solicitor Apprenticeships Most List updated annually with new data, feature research about some of the UK's leading law firms and barrister chambers. Legal Cheek also regularly updates its Key Deadlines Calendar with firm and chamber specific application deadlines and events, and alerts its follower base about upcoming deadlines.

The website also lays out the various Paths to becoming a lawyer, and offers tips for students and graduates at each stage.

== Events ==
Legal Cheek runs numerous careers events for aspiring solicitors, both in-person and virtual, as well as in partnership with leading law firms.

As of 2026, Legal Cheek's UK Virtual Law Fairs are some of the largest law careers events in the UK. Legal Cheek also runs large in-person careers fairs across the UK and Ireland.

== See also ==
- UKSCblog
