= John D. Murphy =

American businessperson

John Murphy
- Born: 1946 (age 79–80); Portland, Oregon
- Other names: Miles Murphy
- Education: San Jose State University
- Known for: Co-founding University of Phoenix
- Spouse: Paula Key

John D. Murphy, also known as Miles Murphy, is a businessman, author, and filmmaker known for co-founding the University of Phoenix.

== Early life ==
Murphy spent his childhood in the Santa Clara Valley. He would later study at San Jose State University in the late 1960s, leading to a teaching position at the college. His time in San Jose also led him to write an unpublished novel about the Murder of Brooke Hart and the lynching of Thomas Harold Thurmond and John M. Holmes, which later became Valley of the Heart's Delight, a film about the event.

== Career ==
During Murphy's time teaching at San Jose State University, he ran a community mental health program that tasked students to help patients released from asylums that were closed by then Governor Ronald Reagan.

In 1976, Murphy and John Sperling co-founded the University of Phoenix. He served as the senior vice president for institutional affairs and academic vice president where he was tasked with government affairs and accreditation for the school. Murphy resigned from his position in 1997 due to "philosophical disagreements over the direction of the school".

=== Filmography ===
- Valley of the Heart's Delight (2006 - Producer, writer)

=== Bibliography ===
- Jury Rigging in the Court of Public Opinion (2007) ISBN 9781430326076
- Mission Forsaken: The University of Phoenix Affair with Wall Street (2013) ISBN 978-0966968316
- American Incendiary Populism (2020) ISBN 9781716656071

== Personal life ==
Murphy resides in St. Helena, California. He operates the Sang-Froid Vineyards on his property.
