= BPP Law School =

Private law school in the United Kingdom

BPP University Law School
- Parent school: BPP University
- Established: 1992
- School type: Private, for-profit
- Dean: Jo-Anne Pugh
- Location: Birmingham, Bristol, Cambridge, Leeds, London (Holborn and Waterloo) and Manchester, United Kingdom
- Enrollment: 5,500
- Faculty: Law
- Website: www.bpp.com

BPP University Law School is a private, for-profit provider of professional and academic legal education in the United Kingdom and one of the founding schools of BPP University.

== History ==
BPP Law School has degree awarding powers through its parent institution BPP University, first awarded by the Privy Council in 2007 and later made ‘indefinite’ in 2020. In February 2016, BPP claimed it was being used by more than 50 City of London law firms to educate their lawyers.

BPP's parent company, Apollo Education Group, was sold to a trio of private equity companies in February 2017. In March of that year, Carl Lygo, the law school's CEO and first Vice Chancellor stepped down. The departure of the law school's Dean, Peter Crisp, followed in June. Crisp went on to become a pro vice chancellor of the University of Law.

In June 2017, BPP was ranked "Bronze" in the Teaching Excellence Framework, a government-backed initiative to make teaching standards more transparent for students, with the categories for education institutions being "Gold" as the highest rank, "Silver", and "Bronze" as the lowest rank.

In July 2017 Andrew Chadwick was appointed Dean of the Law School.

BPP’s undergraduate Bachelor of Laws (LL.B.) programme, which was first set up in 2009, was suspended in May 2018 pending a review of the law school's entire programme portfolio. Enrollment in the LL.B. fell from 665 undergraduates in 2014 to 105 students by 2017. In July 2018, as a result of the LL.B. suspension, Legal Cheek revealed that BPP had made several staff redundant at its Waterloo campus.

In June 2018, BPP shut down its Liverpool campus and told all of its students in Liverpool to relocate and continue their studies at the Manchester campus instead.

In November 2018, BPP’s apprenticeship provision was given an 'Insufficient' rating by Ofsted. In February 2019, Department for Education banned BPP from recruiting new apprentices citing ‘insufficient progress’.

In June 2019, Times Higher Education reported that BPP owners, the Apollo Education Group, were looking to sell the university just two years after ownership changed hands in 2017.

BPP University Law School was partnered and appointed as the provider of training for Solicitors Qualifying Examination (SQE) to the City Consortium in December 2019. In August 2020, citing ‘unreasonable bias’, a formal complaint was submitted by BPP students alleging the law school prioritised students with training contracts at the City Consortium law firms during the COVID-19 pandemic and sent them hard copies of study materials before the summer examination, an offer that was not extended to candidates without a training contract lined up. BPP denied the claims and allegations of favouritism.

In December 2019, BPP University's Companies House entry revealed the termination of the appointment of current Dean Andrew Chadwick as a director. Andrew Chadwick resigned from his statutory role as a director of BPP University Limited on 12 December 2019.

On 16 December 2019, The Lawyer reported that "BPP Law School has been taken off the market following six months in which no potential buyer willing to pay the asking price was found."

BPP launched a shorter (eight months) Barrister Training Course (BTC) in 2019 to replace its current Bar Professional Training Course (BPTC). In 2020, BPP created an AI powered virtual law firm to replicate a typical law firm or chambers to provide virtual practice environment to its students. BPP announced Law Conversion Course (PGDL) in 2021 that will replace both the Graduate Diploma in Law (GDL) and Legal Practice Course (LPC), to help non-law students meet SQE “specific demands”.

On 15 December 2020, the student presidents of the four Inns of Court – Gray's Inn, Lincoln's Inn, Inner Temple and Middle Temple – wrote a joint letter to BPP Law School about what they described as “systemic deficiencies” with the university’s teaching. The student presidents expressed their “unwavering solidarity” with students “negatively impacted” by the quality of teaching on BPP’s Bar Professional Training Course and Graduate Diploma in Law programmes.

In May 2021, official data from education watchdog Office for Students found the university to be the lowest ranked institution in the country for student employability. Reporting on the findings, The Telegraph stated, "Over a year after graduating, 69.2% of students from BPP University - which specialises in law and accountancy courses - have not managed to secure graduate employment or further study."

BPP launched Bridge the SQE and Bridge to the Bar online courses to help “bridge the gap” in 2021 between an undergraduate degree and training as a lawyer.

In 2021, BPP launched pro bono clinic to help provide welfare rights advice.

In January 2022 a reverse mentoring scheme was launched by BPP where law students review law firms on diversity and inclusion.

BPP Law School made training deals in February 2022 to provide SQE training to Dentons, Cripps and Walker Morris trainees.

BPP was partnered with the O Shaped Lawyer for the SQE preparation courses.

In May 2022 BPP Law School won LawWorks and Attorney General Student Pro Bono Awards.

Notable alumni include Laura Farris, later Member of Parliament for Newbury.

== Student Criticism ==
In April 2019, the Bar Standards Board (BSB) launched an investigation after a seating plan error resulted in a number of Bar Professional Training Course (BPTC) students at BPP Law School sitting an exam in what some students likened to a “canteen”.

In May 2019, The Lawyer revealed that BPP Law School in London was the most expensive BPTC course provider in the country for students in 2019-20, with fees nearly £3,000 higher than the national average.

In July 2019, the law school had to issue an apology after several students on its Legal Practice Course (LPC) received their advocacy assessment materials 48 hours later than promised, with their face-to-face assessments due the following weekend.

In December 2019, BPP University Law School was partnered and appointed as the provider of training for Solicitors Qualifying Examination (SQE) to the City Consortium.

In May 2020, BPP was accused of "threatening to withhold" January exam results from students whose fees were overdue. Over 700 BPP students were said to have been affected.

In August 2020, BPP Law School’s Leeds campus BPTC student Sophie Lamb told journalists that ‘she was forced to urinate in a bucket while sat in front of her laptop in her kitchen during the test’ while taking the online bar exams remotely, after students were told they could fail the exam ‘if they left their seats or did not maintain screen eye contact.’

On 2 October 2020, BPP Law School students expressed their frustration at exams being scheduled during the December 2020 winter vacation scheme season. Students said BPP University’s timetabling decision would prevent them from participating in the winter vacation schemes run by law firms, which traditionally acts a gateway to a training contract for students. In response to the complaints regarding students being denied 2020 winter scheme work opportunities, a BPP spokesperson said, “Whilst it is unfortunate that BPP PGDL examinations do fall across the winter scheme dates, students do have the opportunity to attend a 2021 scheme.”

On 15 December 2020, the student presidents of the four Inns of Court – Gray's Inn, Lincoln's Inn, Inner Temple and Middle Temple – wrote a joint letter to BPP University Law School about what they described as “systemic deficiencies” with the quality of teaching on BPP's Bar Professional Training Course and Graduate Diploma in Law programmes.

In 2021, BPP Law School launched pro bono clinic to help provide welfare rights advice, as well as a talk initiative to help its law students with chitchat and networking. Previously BPP Law School had started a wellbeing initiative to teach students meditation. A reverse mentoring scheme was launched by BPP University Law School in January 2022, where law students reviewed law firms on diversity and inclusion. In 2022, BPP Law School partnered with the O Shaped Lawyer for the SQE preparation courses.

=== Issues during COVID-19 pandemic ===
On 20 March 2020, BPP was criticised for having "not clearly communicated" information to students after a student at its Waterloo campus had tested positive for COVID-19.

In July 2020, BPP Law School was on the receiving end of criticism from its students during the COVID-19 pandemic for not delivering physical copies of “permitted materials” and textbooks to its Legal Practice Course students.

In an open letter to BPP’s vice chancellor, students on the BPP University Legal Practice Course revealed that the law school’s class sizes had more than quadrupled in the wake of COVID-19, with 15-person classes now containing up to 70 students. In the letter, BPP students claimed “BPP University’s response to lockdown and Coronavirus has only served to create an environment of mistrust and anxiety for students, severely degrade the quality of teaching and assessment, and push as many costs of adjusting to lockdown onto students.”

On 22 July 2020, The Lawyer reported that many BPP students were locked out of exams due to IT failures and had demanded a partial refund of their fees “based on the period of time students were unable to use BPP facilities.”

On 12 August 2020, the Junior Lawyers Division of the Law Society of England and Wales, which represents LPC students across England and Wales, questioned the University’s decision to charge students registered at its London campuses higher fees than regional counterparts despite the switch to online education, and urged BPP to “take the time to talk with the group” and handle student concerns moving forward.

On 23 November 2020, BPP students said they intend to report the university to the Competition and Markets Authority after the institution refused for a second time to refund tuition fees for alleged lockdown failures.
