= Legal education in Hong Kong =

Legal education in Hong Kong generally refers to the education of lawyers before entry into practice. (Other types of legal education, such as that of Legal Executives/Paralegals, and of the education of lawyers after admission to the High Court of Hong Kong (Continuing Professional Development) are not covered in this article.)

The legal system of Hong Kong is based on the common law system of England and Wales, and it has a similar training and qualification process for solicitors and barristers. However, in September 2008 the LLB programmes switched from a three-year to a four-year curriculum, thereby requiring overseas candidates to sit for the Postgraduate Certificate in Laws (PCLL).

Sitting for the one-year PCLL is required on the pathway to practice law in Hong Kong, therefore overseas law degree holders (from common law jurisdictions) must usually take conversion examinations prior to admission to a PCLL programme offered at one of Hong Kong's three government designated law schools.

== Law as a first degree ==
In 2008, Hong Kong's law schools moved from a three-year to a four-year LLB curriculum, including partaking in the one-year PCLL programme offered at one of three law schools in Hong Kong.

== Law as a second degree ==
There are two routes available for non-law graduates as an alternative to the full-length LLB degree: the Graduate Diploma in English and Hong Kong Law (GDEHKL) and the Juris Doctor (JD). For example, the City University of Hong Kong offers a two-year Juris Doctor degree catering to professionals with a non-law educational background.

=== GDEHKL ===
The GDEHKL is a two-year part-time course jointly offered by the University of Hong Kong's School of Professional and Continuing Education (HKU SPACE) as the course operator, and Manchester Metropolitan University as the qualification awarding institution. The GDEHKL is the only law programme in Hong Kong which substantially satisfies both the requirements for entry into the Postgraduate Certificate in Laws (PCLL) for those who intend to practice law in Hong Kong, and also the requirements for entry into the Legal Practice Course (LPC) and the English Bar Professional Training Course (BPTC) for those who intend to practice in England and Wales.

=== Juris Doctor (JD) ===
The JD in Hong Kong is a two to three years (full-time) course offered by all three law schools, specifically tailored to admitting non-law bachelor degree holders. The Chinese University of Hong Kong also offers a 42-month part-time JD for prospective students.

== PCLL ==
Following graduation, all prospective solicitors and barristers wishing to be qualified in Hong Kong must undertake the Postgraduate Certificate in Laws (PCLL), unless they are taking the Registered Foreign Lawyer route.

== Masters of Laws (LLM) ==
Hong Kong's three law schools (in addition to many overseas universities with program offerings in Hong Kong) offer the Masters of Laws (LLM) degree. These law degrees are usually targeted towards law graduates, however, there are some LLM programs that specifically admit non-law graduates. For example, the Masters of Laws in Arbitration and Dispute Resolution (LLMArbDR) at the City University of Hong Kong admits non-law graduates, as does a similar LLM(Arb&DR) programme at the University of Hong Kong.

== Law schools ==
The LLB, LLM, JD and PCLL programmes are only offered by the three approved law schools in Hong Kong, namely:

- Chinese University of Hong Kong
- City University of Hong Kong
- University of Hong Kong

In addition, HKU School of Professional and Continuing Education (HKU SPACE) provides instruction for law degrees awarded from overseas universities.

HKU SPACE offers a new option for graduates of the Advanced Diploma for Legal Executives (Graduate Level) to directly apply to PCLL programs without a local law degree or foreign law degree with conversion exams. However, to take this option, students must start with the school's Certificate in Legal Studies or other Legal Executive programs approved by the Law Society of Hong Kong and meet benchmarks.

== Training contract or pupillage ==
After the PCLL, prospective solicitors must undertake a two-year training contract with a law firm, whilst prospective barristers must undertake one year's pupillage with sets of chambers.

== See also ==
- Legal education in the United Kingdom
- Legal education in China
