= List of law schools in China =

This is a list of law schools in China including Hong Kong and Macau.

== Mainland China ==
- China University of Political Science and Law
- China Youth College for Political Science
- Chinese Academy of Social Science, the Department of Law
- Chinese People's Public Security University
- Chinese University for Nationalities, Faculty of Law
- East China University of Politics and Law
- Foreign Affairs Institute, the International Law Department
- Fudan University School of Law
- Jilin University Law School
- Nankai University Law School
- Peking University Law School
- Peking University School of Transnational Law in Shenzhen, China
- Renmin University of China Law School
- Shanghai Jiao Tong University KoGuan Law school
- Sichuan University Law School
- Southwest University of Political Science & Law
- Sun Yat Sen University School of Law
- Tsinghua University School of Law
- Tianjin Normal University Law School
- Tongji University Law School
- Beijing University of International Business and Economics
- Wuhan University Law School
- Xiamen University Law School
- Zhongnan University of Economics and Law
- Lanzhou University Law School
- Central University of Finance and Economics Law School

== List of law schools in Hong Kong ==
- Chinese University of Hong Kong, Faculty of Law
- City University of Hong Kong School of Law
- University of Hong Kong Faculty of Law

Hong Kong Baptist University's Department of Accountancy and Law is not a law school, but provides legal education related to business and accountancy.

See also List of law schools in Hong Kong

== List of law schools in Macau ==
- University of Macau, Faculty of Law
- Macau University of Science and Technology

== See also ==
- List of universities in China
