= Adam Soliman =

Adam Soliman is the director of The Fisheries Law Centre. He is a researcher focused on legal and economic issues in Fisheries. He teaches fisheries law in several countries and advocates for further access to justice in small-scale fisheries. He researches and conducts analysis to issues in fisheries management with special focus on small-scale fisheries. He specializes in fisheries management scheme and property rights particularly in catch shares and other management schemes.

He started his career in the agribusiness sector, working for a family operation in the Middle East. He holds a BSc and MSc. in Agricultural Economics. He also had Juris Doctor from the University of Hong Kong and an LL.M. in Agriculture and Food Law from the University of Arkansas.

Adam Soliman asserts the importance of including fisheries law in law school curriculums. He describes the access to justice gap in fisheries and coastal communities as three intertwined issues: lack of education; lack of legal research and lack of advocacy.

== Academic publications ==
- Ecoterrorism and the Reinterpretation of Piracy: The Sea Shepherd Case, forthcoming 2014
- Duty of Stewardship and Fisheries Governance: A Proposed Framework, forthcoming 2014
- Does private property rights promote sustainability? Examining Individual Transferable Quotas in Fisheries”, Seattle Journal of Environmental Law, forthcoming in May 2014
- Using Individual Transferable Quotas (ITQs) To Achieve Social Policy Objectives: A Proposed Intervention, Marine Policy 45C (2014), pp. 76–81
- Individual Transferable Quotas in World Fisheries: Addressing Legal and Rights-Based Issues, Ocean and Coastal Management Journal, Volume 87, January 2014, Pages 102–113
- Property Rights and Individual Transferable Quotas in the U.S.: A Legal Overview, Newsletter on Climate Change, Sustainability Development, and Ecosystems, American Bar Association, April 2013
- Nanotechnology Regulation in Hong Kong: A Comparative Legal Study, publication forthcoming, City University of Hong Kong Law Review, vol 4(1), 2013
- ITQs and Fisheries Management: Policy Risk in Canadian Sablefish, in 2012: New Rules of Trade?, International Agricultural Trade Research Consortium, 2012
- Global Solutions for Biofuel Certification Schemes: A Comparative Analysis”, City University of Hong Kong Law Review, vol 2(3), 2012
- Impacts of ITQs in Canadian Sablefish Fisheries: An Economic Analysis, M.Sc. Thesis, University of British Columbia, 2010

== Book chapters ==
- Adapting ITQs To Support Small Scale Fisheries: Alaska's Community Development Quota Program for Halibut and Sablefish, in Governing the Governance, planned to be published within the MARE Series at Springer in 2015
- Stewardship as a Legal Duty, in Enhancing the Stewardship, Too Big To Ignore Working Group 4, forthcoming 2015

== Selected non-academic articles ==
- Hong Kong Offers a Growing Opportunity to Australia's Food Producers, Hong Kong Business, July 2013
- Genetically Engineered Salmon: Can Producers be Required to Label it?, IntraFish, April 2013
- Why Canadian Agriculture Economics Programs Should Offer Agriculture and Food Law Courses, Newsletter, Canadian Agricultural Economics Society, March 2013
- Seafood Markets and Their Potential, Fish Info & Services, March 2013
- Maintaining a Rich Seafood Market in Hong Kong, Hong Kong Business, March 2013
- Can Social Media Enhance Food Safety?, Food Safety News, January 2013
- Wet Markets in China: A Food Safety Perspective, Food Safety News, December 2012
- Do Nanomaterials Pose Health Risks? What Science Has to Say, Food Safety News, November 2012
- Halal: More Than A Niche, Food Safety News, October 2012
- The Need For Stronger Nanotechnology Regulations, Food Safety News, October 2012

== Law Update ==
- Senior Editor, Fisheries Law Update (quarterly publication commenced June 2013)

== See also ==
- The Fisheries Law Centre
- Fisheries Law
- Fisheries Management
