= Nik Elin v Kelantan =

Federal Court case in Malaysia

Nik Elin v. Kelantan
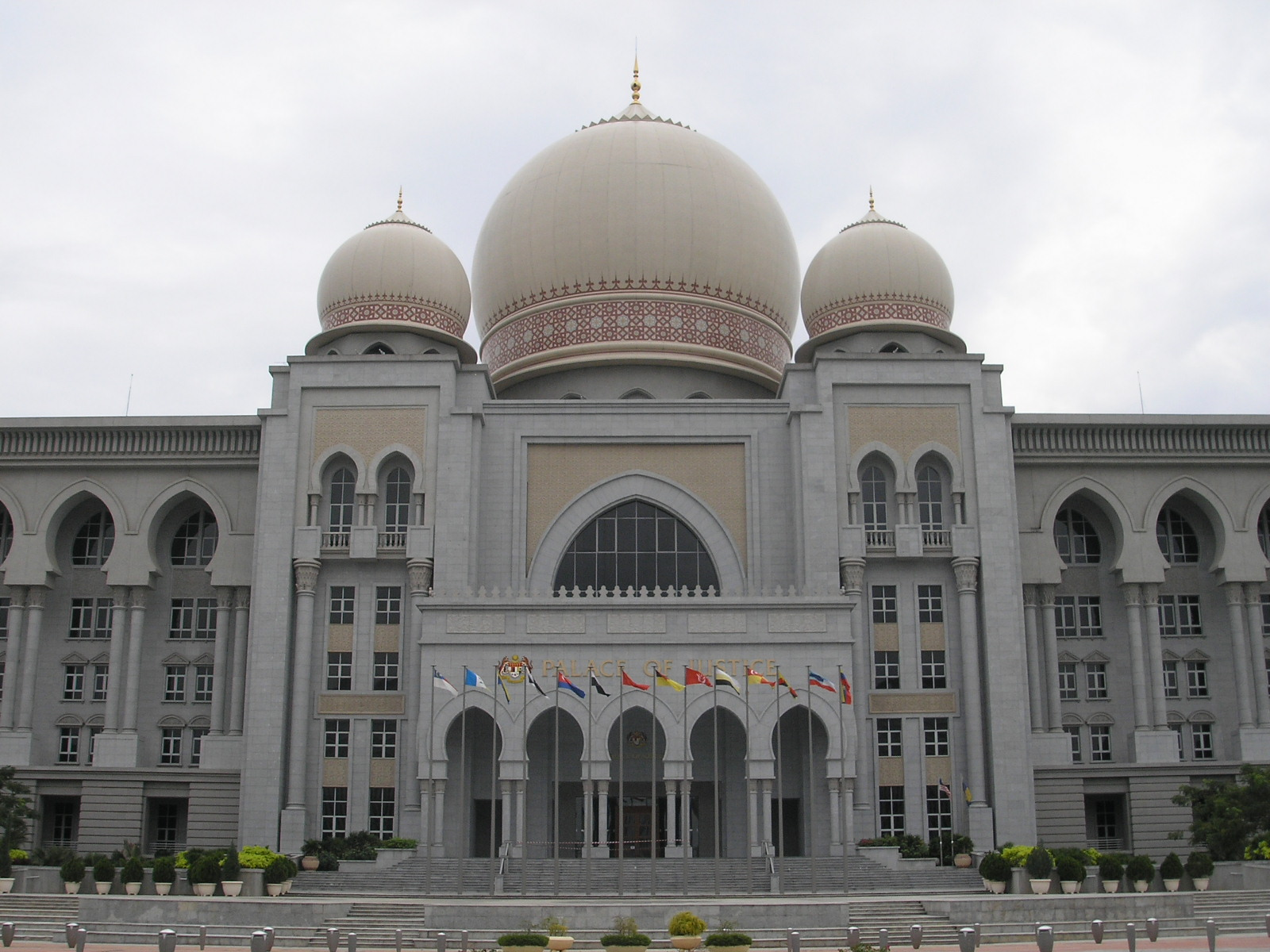
- Court: Federal Court of Malaysia
- Full case name: Nik Elin Zurina Nik Abdul Rashid & Anor v. Kerajaan Negeri Kelantan
- Decided: 9 February 2024
- Docket nos.: BKA-2-05-2022(D)
- Citations: [2024] 3 MLRA 1, [2024] 2 MLJ 150, [2024] 3 CLJ 323, [2024] CLJU 232

Questions presented
- Whether the respondent, via Legislature of State of Kelantan, constitutionally empowered to make said impugned sections of the Syariah Criminal Code (I) Enactment 2019?

Holding
- Declaring ss. 11, 14, 16, 17, 31, 34, 36, 37(1)(b), 39, 40, 41, 42, 43, 44, 45, 47 and 48 of Syariah Criminal Code (I) Enactment 2019 of Kelantan as invalid, null and void

Court membership
- Judges sitting: Tengku Maimun Tuan Mat CJ; Abang Iskandar Abang Hashim PCA; Mohamad Zabidin Mohd Diah CJM; Abdul Rahman Sebli CJSS; Nallini Pathmanathan; Mary Lim Thiam Suan; Harmindar Singh Dhaliwal; Nordin Hassan; Abu Bakar Jais FCJJ

Case opinions
- Decision by: Tengku Maimun Tuan Mat
- Majority: Tengku Maimun Tuan Mat; Abang Iskandar Abang Hashim; Mohamad Zabidin Mohd Diah; Nallini Pathmanathan; Mary Lim Thiam Suan; Harmindar Singh Dhaliwal; Nordin Hassan; Abu Bakar Jais
- Dissent: Abdul Rahman Sebli

Keywords
- Federal Constitution; Parliament; State Legislative Assembly; Kelantan; Penal Code; shariah law; ultra vires; null and void; locus standi; pith and substance

Area of law
- Constitutional law; Civil Procedure

Nik Elin Zurina bt Nik Abdul Rashid & Anor v. Kerajaan Negeri Kelantan, [2024] 2 MLJ 140 is a landmark decision of the Federal Court of Malaysia in which the court in a 8-1 judgement held that the Kelantan State Legislative Assembly did not have the power to enact 16 Sharia laws pertaining to criminal matters, which were deemed null, void and unconstitutional. The Federal Court followed its decision in Iki Putra Mubarrak v. Kerajaan Negeri Selangor & Anor, [2021] 2 MLJ 323, another case which laid out the emphasis of federalism and the division between state and federal powers, that the State Legislative Assembly can only make laws on matters enumerated in the State List (List II) of the Federal Constitution of Malaysia (following the doctrine of ultra vires).

== Background ==
This case stems from a long-standing and ongoing conflict between the legislative and judiciary regarding the implementation of the Islamic Sharia system and the secular civil laws in Malaysia. Following the amendment to the Federal Constitution after the 1988 Malaysian constitutional crisis, which introduced Article 121(1A) to the constitution to demarcate the power and jurisdiction of the civil courts and the Syariah Courts, several cases were filed to challenge the status of the Syariah Courts' jurisdiction. However, in 2021, the Federal Court of Malaysia, in the case of Iki Putra Mubarrak v. Kerajaan Negeri Selangor & Anor, [2021] 3 MLRA 384 held that section 28 of the Syariah Criminal Offences (Selangor) Enactment 1995, a Selangor Sharia criminal law pertaining to liwat (sodomy) was null, void and unconstitutional on the ground that the Selangor State Legislative Assembly had encroached on and contravened the Parliament's power to enact criminal laws under Articles 74(3), 75 and 77 and the Federal Constitution (in which case, section 377A of the Penal Code of Malaysia).

Nik Elin Zurina binti Nik Abdul Rashid and her daughter, Tengku Yasmin Natasha binti Tengku Abdul Rahman, filed petitions on 25 May 2022 to seek a declaration from the Federal Court that 18 provisions of the Kelantan Syariah Criminal Code (I) Enactment 2019 were invalid on the ground that they provided for matters with respect to which the Kelantan State Legislative Assembly had no power to make laws and that the provisions were accordingly void and ultra vires under article 4(1) of the Federal Constitution. Initially, 20 provisions were challenged on their constitutionality; however, the petitioners withdrew their challenges on sections 5 (false claim) and 37(1)(a) (gambling) of the Kelantan Syariah Criminal Code (I) Enactment 2019, leaving only 18 provisions challenged as follows:

- Section 11 – Destroying or defiling a place of worship
- Section 13 – Selling or giving away child to non-Muslim or morally reprehensible Muslim
- Section 14 – Sodomy
- Section 16 – Sexual intercourse with corpse
- Section 17 – Sexual intercourse with non-human
- Section 30 – Words capable of breaking peace
- Section 31 – Sexual harassment
- Section 34 – Possessing false document, giving false evidence, information or statement
- Section 36 – Anything intoxicating
- Section 39 – Reducing scale, measurement and weight
- Section 40 – Executing transactions contrary to hukum syarak
- Section 41 – Executing transactions via usury
- Section 42 – Abuse of halal label and connotation;
- Section 43 – Offering or providing vice services,
- Section 44 – Preparatory act of offering or providing vice services
- Section 45 – Preparatory act of vice
- Section 47 – Act of incest
- Section 48 – Muncikari (pimping, procuring prostitution)

The Federal Court of Malaysia, presided over by former Federal Court judge, Datuk Vernon Ong Lam Kiat, granted leave to the petitioners for their case to be heard fully on the ground that the petitioners had the competency and locus standi to bring an action to challenge the constitutionality and validity of the 18 provisions of the Kelantan Syariah Criminal Code (I) Enactment 2019.

== Decision ==
The case was heard by a full bench, empanelled by the Chief Justice of Malaysia, Tun Tengku Maimun binti Tuan Mat, the President of the Court of Appeal, Tan Sri Datuk Amar Abang Iskandar bin Abang Hashim, Chief Judge of the High Court of Malaya, Tan Sri Dato' Mohamad Zabidin bin Mohd Diah, Chief Judge of the High Court of Sabah and Sarawak, Tan Sri Dato' Abdul Rahman bin Sebli and five other Federal Court judges, Justices Tan Sri Datuk Nallini Pathmanathan, Dato' Mary Lim Thiam Suan, Datuk Harmindar Singh Dhaliwal, Dato' Nordin bin Hassan and Dato' Abu Bakar bin Jais.

=== Majority judgement ===
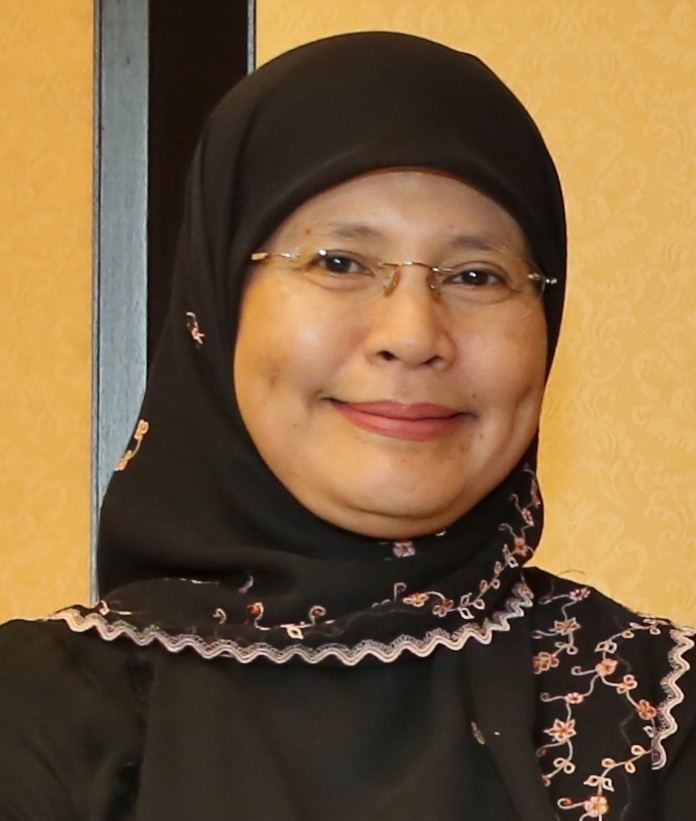
Chief Justice of Malaysia, Tengku Maimun Tuan Mat delivered the majority judgement.

The Federal Court of Malaysia issued its decision on 9 February 2024. In an 8-1 judgement, the Court held that the 16 provisions of the Kelantan Syariah Criminal Code (I) Enactment 2019 (save for sections 13 and 30) were deemed void and null on the ground that those impugned provisions were ultra vires, that the State had no power to enact laws on criminal matters which fall under matters conferred in the Federal List of the Federal Constitution (List I). This principle was established by the Federal Court in Iki Putra Mubarrak v. Kerajaan Negeri Selangor & Anor, [2021] 2 MLJ 323, which affirmed the doctrine of ultra vires and the doctrine of pith and substance.

The majority judgement was written by Chief Justice of Malaysia, Tun Tengku Maimun binti Tuan Mat and joined by President of the Court of Appeal, Tan Sri Datuk Amar Abang Iskandar bin Abang Hashim, Chief Judge of the High Court of Malaya, Tan Sri Dato' Mohamad Zabidin bin Mohd Diah, and Justices Tan Sri Datuk Nallini Pathmanathan, Dato' Mary Lim Thiam Suan, Datuk Harmindar Singh Dhaliwal, Dato' Nordin bin Hassan and Dato' Abu Bakar bin Jais.

==== Judicial independence and public controversy ====
In the majority judgement, before proceeding to the main issues raised in the petition, Chief Justice Tun Tengku Maimun Tuan Mat noted that the Judiciary's decisions in the present case and the Iki Putra Mubarrak case have been called into question based on erroneous and politically fuelled sentiments by certain parties outside the court.

The Chief Justice specifically mentioned Yusfarizal Yussoff as one of such example. Yusfarizal Yussoff, a PAS member since 2023 and a lawyer representing the Kelantan Islamic Religious Affairs Department as a amicus curiae in the present case, has previously contended that the present case and Iki Putra Mubarrak are undermining the position of Islam and will put an end to the Shariah court system in this country. He also further claimed that the Islamic law and Shariah courts in Malaysia will be "buried with a tombstone placed on top at anytime" (if the court ruled in favours of the petitioners), as noted by the Chief Justice in the summary of judgement.

The Federal Court vehemently rejected Yusfarizal's contention, and even criticised him that he is misleading the public and that he "should think before he speaks", as the Federal Constitution has given all State Governments in this country the legislative powers to enact Islamic law, provided it is enacted within the constitutional boundaries, therefore the allegations brought forward by Yusfarizal are simply untrue.

Chief Justice Tun Tengku Maimun Tuan Mat emphasised that the present case before the court is not about the position of Islamic laws or the Shariah court, but about whether the Kelantan State Legislative Assembly is constitutionally empowered to enact the impugned provisions. Or in other words, which is the correct legislative bodies to enact the impugned provisions, the Parliament or the Kelantan Assembly?

==== Constitutionality ====
In addressing the constitutionality of the 18 provisions of the Kelantan Syariah Criminal Code (I) Enactment 2019, Chief Justice Tun Tengku Maimun binti Tuan Mat highlighted the aspects of matters falling under the precepts of Islam, purely religious offences and general criminal laws, holding that many criminal law offences such as theft, robbery, rape and corruption would naturally encompass and are caught by the precepts of Islam. However, as these offences fall within the general purview of criminal law, only the Federal Parliament has the power to enact such laws to the exclusion of the State Legislatures as this general system is dictated by the Federal Constitution, specifically the separation of legislative powers between the Federal Legislature (Parliament) and the State Legislatures.

The Right Honourable Chief Justice also remarked that the placement of Islamic law including the powers to create and punish offences against the precepts of Islam, except with regard to matters in the Federal List (List I) of the Federal Constitution, in item 1 of the State List of the Federal Constitution, was done to preserve the sanctity of the religion of Islam and to ensure its continuous survival in the country's legal system. Hence, the inclusion of article 121(1A) of the Federal Constitution was a celebrated act to preserve the substantive validity and integrity of the Syariah Courts.

Chief Justice Tun Tengku Maimun binti Tuan Mat defined the first category, which is in regards to the 'precepts of Islam' as offences that can be created and punished under item 1 of the State List of the Federal Constitution, which is specific and includes any matter included in the specific entries of item 1 of the State List or any other applicable provision of the Federal Constitution including article 11(4) of the Federal Constitution, which emphasises the power of Parliament and State Legislative Assemblies to restrict the propagation of any religious doctrine or belief among persons professing the religion of Islam.

Item 1 of the State List provides in part the power of the States to enact laws with respect to Islamic law relating to testate and intestate, betrothal, marriage, divorce, dower, maintenance, adoption, legitimacy, guardianship, gifts, partitions and non-charitable trust. Since these laws are only applicable to persons professing the religion of Islam and are enacted on the basis of them complying with Islamic law, such laws will encompass the precepts of Islam. If any offence is enacted by the State Legislative Assemblies for the creation and punishment of offences against the 'precepts of Islam' by reference to any of the expressly stated entries in item 1 of the State List, it cannot possibly fall within the Federal List, which focuses on matters which Parliament can enact. The preclusion clause in the State List cannot therefore apply in such cases.

Chief Justice Tun Tengku Maimun binti Tuan Mat further propounded the second category, which is in respect to [criminal] matters which are purely religious in nature, as a more open-ended definition of anything that can possibly be an offence in religion of Islam and its laws that is not otherwise directly referenced to any of the express entries in item 1 of the State List of the Federal Constitution. The Right Honourable Chief Justice provided that importance must be heeded to the definition of 'criminal law' as the phrase is too broad and nebulous to be accorded a set definition in the context of the Federal Constitution that can stand the test of time.

The first category of 'criminal law' refers to the power of Parliament to create and punish any offences with respect to any of the entries included in the Federal List in the Federal Constitution. As such, if the Federal List empowers Parliament to make a law on any given subject matter, then the creation of any offences or punishments in relation to that subject matter must be deemed to be a part of 'criminal law'.

However, similar to the phrase 'precepts of Islam' in item 1 of the State List of the Federal Constitution, item 4 of the Federal List, which spells out the creation of any offences in respect of any of the matters in the Federal List itself, does not expressly confine 'criminal law' to only matters included in the Federal List. Hence, there is a second broad category of criminal law that is incapable of a set definition either in substance or by direct reference to the Federal List and deals with all offences other than by direct reference to the Federal List as 'general criminal law'. General criminal law includes any law that Parliament can enact to create or punish offences the nature of which can apply to any person in Malaysia irrespective of their status, race or religion, and grounded upon the general preservation of public order, health, safety, security, morality, etc.

Therefore, in what constitutes a 'purely religious offence', Chief Justice Tun Tengku Maimun binti Tuan Mat laid down a two-step approach. The first step is to determine whether the State-legislated offence in question is, in the first place, a 'religious offence'. The general characteristics of what can constitute a 'religious offence' is one that relates to (i) aqidah, (ii) sanctity of the Islamic religion and its institution, or (iii) one purely relating to morality in Islam. The second step requires the court to determine if the 'religious offence' is a 'purely religious offence'.

In the first scenario where the State-legislated offence is one that can apply only to Muslims, enacted only for purposes of Islamic law or religious reasons, and confined only to the religion of Islam relating to (1) aqidah, (2) the sanctity of the Islamic religion and its institution; or (3) one purely relating to morality in Islam, then it is a 'purely religious offence' and is validly enacted by the State Legislative Assembly. However, in the second scenario where the State-legislated offence in question is a 'religious offence' but can, in pith and substance, be deemed as applying principles of 'general criminal law' which relates to overall public order, safety, health, security, morality, etc., then it cannot be said to be a 'purely religious offence' and would be invalid and void by virtue of it having been caught by the preclusion clause in the State List of the Federal Constitution.

As a result, after a thorough analysis on all the 18 provisions of the Kelantan Syariah Criminal Code (I) Enactment 2019, scrutinising their pith and substance, Chief Justice Tun Tengku Maimun binti Tuan Mat concluded that sections 13 and 30 of the Kelantan State Enactment were tantamount to laws only applicable only to persons professing the religion of Islam, thus are religious offences which the Kelantan Legislative Assembly can validly enact as it clearly falls under the State List of the Federal Constitution. Thus, the two impugned provisions were constitutional. On the other hand, the remaining 16 provisions of the Kelantan State Enactment fell under matters of criminal law under the Federal List of the Federal Constitution or general criminal law which involves an element of public order, safety, health, security, morality, etc., of general application to everyone in the country. Thus, they were caught by the preclusion clause in the State List of the Federal Constitution and deemed null and void.

==== Federalism ====
The case also highlighted the importance of federalism and its development since Malaysia's independence from the British. Chief Justice Tun Tengku Maimun bin Tuan Mat stated that prior to the British occupation of Malaysia, Malaya, Sabah and Sarawak had their own legal systems, and prior to 1957, there was a huge clarion call for independence from the British. As a result, parties from various divides discussed the creation of the Federal Constitution. Reference was made to the landmark former Federal Court case of Ah Thian v. Government of Malaysia [1976] 2 MLJ 112, where the Lord President of the Federal Court, Tun Mohamed Suffian bin Mohamed Hashim held that the British legal system is different from Malaysia, that the biggest and most fundamental difference is that Parliament is supreme in Britain, however, the same is not true in Malaysia as there is a written constitution and it is the supreme law of the country under article 4(1) of the Federal Constitution.

The Right Honourable Chief Justice continued that the Federal Constitution forms the basis of the existence of all three arms of Malaysia's Federal Government and all the State Governments. There are portions within it which govern the Malaysian territory, the Yang di-Pertuan Agong, the executive, the legislatures (federal and state), the judiciary, various important public commissions, fundamental rights, citizenship and so on. Moreover, the Constitution of every State in Malaysia must contain the provisions as set out in the Eighth Schedule of the Federal Constitution. Given the strong federalist nature of the Federal Constitution, the State Legislative Assemblies cannot legislate their own written constitutions as they please and by virtue of article 71(4) of the Federal Constitution, if it appears to Parliament that in any State any provision of the Federal Constitution or of the State Constitution is being disregarded, Parliament may by law make provision for securing compliance with those provisions.

The Ninth Schedule of the Federal Constitution creates three different legislative fields. The first is the Federal List which provides for the general fields upon which Parliament can legislate. The second is the State List which stipulates what fields of laws within which the State Legislative Assemblies can enact State laws. Finally, the Concurrent List sets out joint areas upon which Parliament and the State Legislature can both make laws. Additionally, Sabah and Sarawak also have additional supplements to the State List. Hence, the Federal Constitution was formulated with a central bias, that the primary powers of legislation are to be accorded to Parliament with certain other limited powers to the States of Malaysia. This fact is apparent not only in the structure of the Constitution, but is also clarified by the Reid Commission, which is the Commission principally responsible for the creation of the Federal Constitution.

Chief Justice Tun Tengku Maimun binti Tuan Mat also emphasised article 77 of the Federal Constitution which confers the State legislatures power to make laws with respect to any matter not enumerated in any of the Lists set out in the Ninth Schedule, not being a matter in respect of which Parliament has power to make laws. This stems from the Reid Commission, where in commenting on the initial draft version of article 77 of the Federal Constitution, the Commission noted that because the division of legislative powers between the Federation and the States was so clear and distinct, any cause for the States to legislate on residual powers might never actually arise. Therefore, both Parliament and the State Legislative Assemblies are confined to their respective Legislative Lists and ordinarily, they can only make laws within their own respective Legislative Lists subject to certain exceptions.

Through historical documents such as the Reid Commission which led to the construction of the Federal Constitution of Malaysia, they indicate that matters relating to Islamic law would be conferred and confined to the States of Malaysia except in the Federal Territories of Kuala Lumpur, Putrajaya and Labuan and not only were the States accorded a limited power to legislate by what is confined to the State List, the inclusion of Islamic law and personal law into the State List was done historically with the clear intention of limiting the kinds of laws that the States can enact on that subject matter.

The addition to the preclusion clause to item 1 of the State List of the Federal Constitution was to ensure that the powers of the States cannot extend to the point of legislating on matters included in the Federal List. Moreover, the fact that 'criminal laws' generally mentioned in item 4 of the Federal List means that the primary powers of legislation were intended to be solely reposed in Parliament leaving only certain limited powers of legislation to the States in item 1 of the State List including legislation dealing with the creation and punishment of offences against the precepts of Islam. As a result, the application of Islamic law is per se limited to what is provided for mostly in the State List and with some exceptions in the Federal List.

Chief Justice Tun Tengku Maimun binti Tuan Mat also brought up the secular nature of the Malaysian legal system by referring to the former Supreme Court case of Che Omar bin Che Soh v. Public Prosecutor [1988] 2 MLJ 55, where the Lord President of the Supreme Court of Malaysia, Tun Mohamed Salleh Abas held that the framers of the Federal Constitution understood the meaning of the word 'Islam' in the context of article 3 of the Federal Constitution. If it had been otherwise, there would have been another provision in the Constitution which would have the effect that any law contrary to the injunction and beliefs of Islam will be void. Far from making such provision, article 162 of the Federal Constitution, on the other hand, purposely preserves the continuity of secular law prior to the Federal Constitution, unless such law is contrary to the Constitution itself. Hence, the law in this country is still secular law, where morality not accepted by the law is not enjoying the status of law.

Hence, the general legal system in Malaysia leans more towards secularity without being purely secular, meaning that the source of Malaysia's law is not purely from divine or Islamic law and the reason why Malaysia is not a purely secular country is because limited allowance has been made in the Federal Constitution for the legislation and application of Islamic law. Regardless, Chief Justice Tun Tengku Maimun binti Tuan Mat remarked that "we are a unique nation with a mixed or dual secular and Islamic law legal systems that are meant to operate independently of each other."

Having regard to the central bias in favour of the Federal Parliament when it comes to criminal legislation, and when the Federal and State lists are read in tandem, The Right Honourable Chief Justice noted that the intention behind item 1 of the State List is that it was intended to apply only to offences that are purely religious in nature. In other words, offences that relate purely to the precepts of Islam and nothing else. Further, the other reason why the Federal Constitution was drafted in such a way is so that Muslims would not be subject to different laws and legal systems for the same offences when compared to non-Muslims, for example on general laws such as rape, corruption, theft, robbery, etc. Thus, Muslims and non-Muslims are subject to the same general set of criminal laws, nonetheless, because of the duality of Malaysia's legal system, Muslims are also subject to Islamic law and offences. In terms of personal law and adat, the Muslims follow their own set of laws as opposed to non-Muslims who are bound by laws passed by Parliament.

==== Locus standi ====
A locus standi refers to the standing or right of the person to sue. In the preliminary objections, the Kelantan State Government, as the respondents, contended that the petitioners had no locus standi to file their petition or that in any event, the petition was academic, abstract and irrelevant. They further claimed that the petitioners were busybodies who had no basis to initiate their case in that the petitioners were not even adversely affected by any of the challenged sections of the Kelantan Syariah Criminal Code (I) Enactment 2019. In response, the petitioners suggested that they either do, or intended later on in life, to reside in Kelantan and that they have properties in Kelantan and do have some semblance of a life there. Thus, they are residents of Kelantan and the Kelantan State Enactment was a law that can be used against them. Their argument, at its core, derived from the fact that the challenged sections exist as law, and can be enforced against them, thus having a basis for them to file the petition.

The Chief Justice Tun Tengku Maimun binti Tuan Mat, in affirming the arguments of the petitioners, made reference to the landmark Federal Court case of Datuk Bandar Kuala Lumpur v. Perbadanan Pengurusan Trellises & Ors and other appeals [2023] 3 MLJ 829, where Justice Tan Sri Datuk Nallini Pathmanathan, in delivering the leading judgement, was of the opinion that a locus standi ought to be relaxed as much as possible to allow any public-spirited person to file a public lawsuit provided that he has some interest in the matter. Thus, in a case such as the petition which involved constitutional judicial review, the principle of the locus standi must be adjudged on principles even broader than the ones already applicable in the Trellises case.

The Right Honourable Chief Justice further mentioned article 4(1) of the Federal Constitution, which elucidated the Federal Constitution as the supreme law of the Federation of Malaysia and any law passed after Merdeka Day, or Independence Day, which is inconsistent with the Federal Constitution shall, to the extent of the inconsistency, be void. Hence, any challenge brought under article 4(1) of the Federal Constitution must have been brought on the premise of that law having been 'passed after Merdeka Day'. Nevertheless, if that law is inconsistent with the Federal Constitution upon its passing, article 4(1) of the Federal Constitution dictates that the said law is invalid. In light of the presumption of constitutionality, until and unless that law is challenged and struck down in the appropriate court, then the law must continuously be presumed valid and constitutional.

Chief Justice Tun Tengku Maimun binti Tuan Mat further opined that the precedent established in the Trellises case extended and clarified the scope of locus standi in relation to the manner in which administrative power was exercised and that this was typical in a statutory judicial review as the question of the manner of exercise of power will, to some extent, depend upon against whom it is exercised.

In addition, article 4(1) of the Federal Constitution, which forms the substantive constitutional basis for all constitutional judicial review cases, does not discriminate between the circumstances and situations in which such challenges can be brought or the categories of persons that can bring them, apart from differentiating between the nature and procedure for those proceedings, that is between 'incompetency' and 'inconsistency' challenges. In referring to the Federal Court case of Wong Shee Kai v. Government of Malaysia [2022] 6 MLJ 102, the presiding judge of the case, Chief Justice Tun Tengku Maimun binti Tuan Mat explained the definition of 'incompetency' challenges', which are a very defined type of 'inconsistency' challenges involving a very specific allegation under article 4(3) of the Federal Constitution in that Parliament or the State Legislature had no power to make it, and they require leave under article 4(4) of the Federal Constitution before they can be initiated and the relief sought in a petition must be limited to a declaratory relief to the effect that the impugned provision is invalid on the ground that the relevant Legislature (Federal or State) had no power to make it.

Article 4 - Supreme Law of the Federation

(3) The validity of any law made by Parliament or the Legislature of any State shall not be questioned on the ground that it makes provision with respect to any matter with respect to which Parliament or, as the case may be, the Legislature of the State has no power to make laws, except in proceedings for a declaration that the law is invalid on that ground or -

(a) If the law was made by Parliament, in proceedings between the Federation and one or more States;

(b) If the law was made by the Legislature of a State, in proceedings between the Federation and that State.

(4) Proceedings for a declaration that a law is invalid on the ground mentioned in Clause (3) (not being proceedings falling within paragraph (a) or (b) of the Clause) shall not be commenced without the leave of a judge of the Federal Court; and the Federation shall be entitled to be a party to any such proceedings, and so shall any State that would or might be a party to proceedings brought for the same purpose under paragraph (a) or (b) of the Clause.

Nevertheless, there is nothing expressed or implied within articles 4(3) and 4(4) of the Federal Constitution to suggest that anyone who seeks to challenge the constitutionality of a legal provision must first prove his or her reasons per se for bringing the challenge, apart from having to advance arguments on why the provisions they challenge are invalid on grounds stated in article 4(3) of the Federal Constitution. Consequently, all citizens of Malaysia are entitled to rely on the Federal Constitution for protection and to approach the Federal Court for a competency challenge under articles 4(4) and 128 of the Federal Constitution.

Article 128 - Jurisdiction of Federal Court

(1) The Federal Court shall, to the exclusion of any other court, have jurisdiction to determine in accordance with any rules of court regulating the exercise of such jurisdiction -

(a) any question whether a law made by Parliament or by the Legislature of a State is invalid on the ground that it makes provision with respect to a matter with respect to which Parliament or, as the case may be, the Legislature of the State has no power to make laws; and

(b) disputes on any other question between States or between the Federation and any State.

Chief Justice Tun Tengku Maimun binti Tuan Mat further prescribed that the passing of a law, whether it is a Federal or State law, is a legislative act which always remains subject to judicial scrutiny and review in line with the principle of separation of powers. Hence, there is no constitutional basis to limit the types of people or category of persons who can, at the very minimum, challenge the existence of the law as a separate constitutional cause of action in addition to cases where a person affected by the exercise of such powers against them can also challenge the validity of that same law.

Ultimately, the Right Honourable Chief Justice agreed that the petitioners had a locus standi to bring an action against the Kelantan State Government under articles 4(3) and 4(4) of the Federal Constitution, affirmed the leave of the Federal Court by former Justice Datuk Vernon Ong Lam Kiat and rejected the respondents' preliminary objections.

=== Dissenting ===
Chief Judge of the High Court of Sabah and Sarawak, Tan Sri Dato' Abdul Rahman bin Sebli delivered the lone dissenting judgement. The Right Honourable Chief Judge did not address much on the constitutionality and validity of the 18 impugned provisions of the Kelantan State Enactment, rather his judgement centred more on the issue of locus standi, that the petitioners did not have the required locus standi to file the petition and were therefore busybodies which lacked the basis and merit.

The Right Honourable Chief Judge first held that a leave order that has already been granted can be set aside by a court if it is found that it should not have been granted in the first place for want of jurisdiction, meaning that the court had gone beyond its powers to hear a case. In other words, the grant of leave cannot confer jurisdiction on a court where there is none in the first place, and the court has no jurisdiction where there is no standing or locus standi to sue.

Chief Judge Tan Sri Dato' Abdul Rahman bin Sebli further disagreed with the petitioners' argument that even where a party or a petitioner had no locus standi to maintain the action, the Federal Court was nevertheless seized of its exclusive original jurisdiction under article 128(1)(a) of the Federal Constitution to hear and to decide on the merits of the case or petition. This was because locus standi is a condition precedent to the exercise of the court's jurisdiction under article 128(1)(a) of the Federal Constitution. Therefore, the petitioners filed their case in the right court but without the necessary locus standi or standing to sue, their petition had no leg to stand on.

Moreover, the Right Honourable Chief Judge opined that the law on locus standi in a constitutional challenge as laid down by the majority decision in the Federal Court case of Datuk Seri Anwar Ibrahim v. Government of Malaysia & Anor [2020] 4 MLJ 133 was the law to be applied when it becomes necessary to determine whether a petitioner has the requisite standing to sue in a challenge or application under article 4(4) of the Federal Constitution. In the aforementioned Federal Court case, Justice Tan Sri Datuk Nallini Pathmanathan held that the applicant in a case involving a constitutional challenge has to establish an arguable violation of his or her constitutional rights in addition to being 'adversely affected' and having a 'genuine interest' before he or she can be conferred with a standing or locus standi to sue.

Additionally, Chief Judge Tan Sri Dato' Abdul Rahman bin Sebli stated laid down that in order to establish locus standi, the petitioners must first of all show that their challenge to the constitutional validity of the 18 impugned provisions of the Kelantan State Enactment does not exist in a factual vacuum by showing that there is an arguable violation of their constitutional rights, only then can a real and actual controversy between them and the Government of Kelantan arise for the Federal Court's determination in the exercise of its exclusive original jurisdiction under article 128(1)(a) of the Federal Constitution. The petitioners have completely failed to clear this hurdle by failing to point out which of their constitutional rights that are or have been violated by the 18 impugned provisions. The Right Honourable Chief Judge also deemed the contention of the petitioners that the Kelantan State Legislative Assembly had no competency to enact the 18 provisions as irrelevant to the issue of locus standi on the ground that it only goes to the substantive merits of the challenge and not to the issue of standing or locus standi to sue.

Furthermore, the Right Honourable Chief Judge found that the first petitioner, Nik Elin Zurina binti Nik Abdul Rashid's fear of a real risk that she might be subjected to the investigative powers of the Kelantan Government in relation to 16 challenged provisions as mentioned in her leave application was not only unfounded but was also not a reason to confer on her the locus standi to maintain her petition. Unlike the petitioner in the Iki Putra Mubarrak case, there was nothing for the petitioners to fear unless they regularly participated in the conduct criminalised by the 16 provisions. On top of that, the petitioners had not shown how their personal lives as Muslims have been overshadowed in significant respects by the 16 provisions except for the first petitioner's unfounded fear that the provisions may be enforced against her and her daughter.

Overall, Chief Judge Tan Sri Dato' Abdul Rahman bin Sebli concluded that the petitioners did not have the locus standi to maintain the action and consequently the Federal Court had no basis in law to exercise its exclusive original jurisdiction under article 128(1)(a) of the Federal Constitution to hear and to decide on the merits of the petition. He found that the petitioners were busybodies for bringing a case that was frivolous, vexatious and an abuse of the Federal Court's process. In addition, the Right Honourable Chief Judge disagreed with the former Federal Court judge, Justice Datuk Vernon Ong Lam Kiat's decision to grant leave to the petitioners, stating that the learned former Federal Court judge had not adequately applied his mind to the law on locus standi and how it works in a constitutional challenge under article 4(4) of the Federal Constitution.

== Impact ==
=== Reaction ===
==== Positive ====
Nik Elin said that she did not derive any personal benefits from her action, and said that the petition was filed to defend the sovereignty of the country, saying that it was "the duty of lawyers to uphold and defend the sovereignty of the law". She also said that the court's verdict had nothing to do with Islamic doctrine, but rather was about harmonising the laws between both Syariah and civil courts, and was hopeful that state assemblies would be more careful when drafting state legislations.

The Deputy Chief Minister of Kelantan, Datuk Dr. Mohamed Fadzli bin Hassan, following the ruling, urged the government to amend the Federal Constitution, saying that the Federal Government had the responsibility to review Article 4(4) of the Federal Constitution as it had also touched on the Syariah Court's jurisdiction. He also said that the state government would, through its special committee, review the decision before taking any further actions to amend the enactments.

The Minister in the Prime Minister's Department (Religious Affairs), Datuk Dr. Mohd Na'im bin Mokhtar assured that the position of the Syariah Court in Malaysia would remain intact and continue to be guaranteed by the provisions in the Federal Constitution, but would also convene with all stakeholders and parties involved with the Syariah Court to discuss and assess the next steps for its empowerment. He also said that a special committee would prepare a report based on its findings within six months to a year, which would later be presented to the Malaysian National Council for Islamic Religious Affairs and the Conference of Rulers before being presented to the Cabinet.

==== Negative ====
The Leader of the Opposition, Dato' Seri Hamzah bin Zainudin, described the outcome of the case as a 'serious discrepancy in powers and areas of jurisdiction related to the rights of the majority of Malaysians to practise their religion', and said that he would also seek with the Yang di-Pertuan Agong, His Majesty Sultan Ibrahim, and the Sultan of Selangor, Sultan Sharafuddin Idris Shah, to raise the people's concerns and address the necessary adjustments for the empowerment of the Syariah Courts.

Youth Chief of the Malaysian United Indigenous Party (BERSATU), Wan Ahmad Fayhsal bin Wan Ahmad Kamal, said that the decision held significant implications for the power and role of the institution of the Malay Rulers as pillars of Islamic law and legislation across the country, claiming that the ruling implied that anyone could approach the Federal Court and contest the provisions of state Syariah laws, even if they were not directly affected or have locus standi in the case, and would "create space for secularism to further encroach upon Malay and Islamic society".

Secretary-General of the Malaysian Islamic Party (PAS), Datuk Seri Takiyuddin bin Haji Hassan, called the day the decision was made a "Black Friday" for Islamic Sharia law, saying that Sharia criminal laws in other states were in a dangerous and critical state, a statement which was criticised by the G25 Malaysia group as highly provocative and dangerous, and bordering on incitement
