= Nallini Pathmanathan =

Malaysian jurist and lawyer

Yang Arif Tan Sri Datuk Nallini Pathmanathan PSM PMW

Justice of the Federal Court of Malaysia
- In office 26 November 2018 – 20 February 2026
- Monarchs: Muhammad V (2018-2019); Abdullah (2019–2024); Ibrahim Iskandar (2024-2026)
- Prime Minister: Mahathir Mohamad (2018–2020); Muhyiddin Yassin (2020–2021); Ismail Sabri Yaakob (2021–2022); Anwar Ibrahim (2022-2026)

Personal details
- Born: Nallini Pathmanathan; 23 August 1959 (age 67) Federation of Malaya (now Malaysia)
- Citizenship: Malaysia
- Education: University of London (BSc); University of Westminster (Diploma)
- Profession: Lawyer

Nallini Pathmanathan (born 23 August 1959) is a Malaysian jurist who served as a judge of the Federal Court of Malaysia from November 2018 to February 2026. She was the first female judge of Malaysian Indian origin to be elevated to the apex court in Malaysia. She was then appointed as inaugural chairperson of the Malaysian Media Council in June 2026. Nallini is also an Adjunct Professor at the Faculty of Law, University of Malaya.

== Early life and education ==
Coming from a family consisting largely of doctors, Nallini pursued a degree in physiology and graduated from the University of London with a Bachelors of Science (BSc) in Physiology in 1982.

Upon completing her studies, she realised that she no longer wished to pursue a career in Physiology. Following her father's suggestion, she enrolled in a law conversion course at the University of Westminster in 1983, earning a Diploma in Law. She was called to the English Bar (Middle Temple) in 1984 and subsequently to the Malaysian Bar on 15 February 1986.

== Career ==
Nallini commenced legal practice in 1986 with Skrine, a law firm in Malaysia, and in 1995, became a partner at the firm in 1995. She served as the chairman of the executive committee of Skrine for a few years.

In 2007, Nallini was elevated to the Bench, initially serving in the criminal courts of the High Court of Shah Alam. By 2009, she was elevated to High Court Judge and presided over the commercial courts at the High Court of Kuala Lumpur shortly after their establishment.

Nallini was then elevated to the Court of Appeal in 2014, where she spent four years before being elevated to the nation’s apex court, the Federal Court, in 2018.

Nallini served on committees of the Malaysian Bar Council and was a member of the Disciplinary Committee Panel of the Advocates & Solicitors Disciplinary Board. As of 2007, she is a Fellow of the Chartered Institute of Arbitrators. She is also the chairperson of the Malaysian Middle Temple Alumni Association and is Vice Chair of the International Bar Association's Judges' Forum. Further, Nallini is a member of the Steering Group for the Standing International Forum of Commercial Courts. Recently, her Ladyship was appointed Chair of Malaysia’s Maritime Law Review Committee, modernising maritime legislation.

In 2023, Nallini was appointed to Malaysia's Judicial Appointments Committee for a two-year term. The Judicial Appointments Committee also identified Nallini as a potential candidate for the role of Chief Judge of Malaya, the third highest judicial office in the country.

On February 20, 2026 she retired from the Federal Court bench after nearly eight years of service.

On June 15, 2026 it was announced by the Malaysian Media Council that Nallini had been appointed its inaugural chairperson. Following her retirement from the Federal Court in 2026, Nallini Pathmanathan was appointed an adjunct professor at the Faculty of Law, Universiti Malaya. In this role, she contributes her experience in the judiciary and legal practice to the faculty’s academic and professional activities.

== Notable Judgements ==
=== Constitutional and Administrative Law ===
==== Peguam Negara Malaysia v Mkini Dotcom Sdn Bhd & Anor [2021] 2 MLJ 652 ====
In deciding on whether an online news portal committed contempt for publishing comments of third party subscribers in response to an online news article ‘[Chief Justice] orders all courts to be fully operational from July 1’, Justice Pathmanathan authored the sole dissent from a seven-member panel by deciding that the online news portal was not liable for contempt.

In her decision, Justice Pathmanathan held that contempt requires proof of actual knowledge and awareness of the offending content and not merely constructive knowledge. The news portal could not, in her Ladyship’s view, be deemed a ‘publisher’ as it did not have any knowledge of the impugned third-party comments until some three days after and after which, the said comments were taken down within 12 minutes. Far less could it be said, her Ladyship opined, that the news portal possessed the requisite ‘intention to publish’ which was the foundational element for quasi-criminal offence of scandalizing the court. In Justice Pathmanathan’s mind, the standard of proof was not met.

Her Ladyship emphasised that the requirement for actual knowledge as a criterion to establish liability of online intermediaries such as a news portal functioned to not just avoid unduly burdens of round-the-clock supervision (as opposed to the flag-and-takedown approach) but also ensure the non-dilution of the freedom of expression, a constitutionally guaranteed right under Article 10.

==== Maria Chin Abdullah v Ketua Pengarah Imigresen & Anor [2021] 1 MLJ 750 ====
In delivering one of two dissents against the majority decision, Justice Pathmanathan held the ouster clause contained in s 59A of the Immigration Act 1959/1963 (Immigration Acts), purporting to bar a court from examining the constitutionality of any executive action taken by a Minister under the Immigration Acts, as void. Justice Pathmanathan concurred entirely with her fellow dissenting judge, Chief Justice Tun Tengku Maimun bt Tuan Mat, and wrote her dissent in the belief that a multiplicity of views on the approaches to be adopted when construing the Federal Constitution enabled a better appreciation of its substance ([242]).

Justice Pathmanathan commenced her analysis with her view that Article 4(1) of the Federal Constitution is the primary article that defines the nature and extent of judicial power ([257]). To that extent, her Ladyship posited that Article 121(1) of the Federal Constitution ought to be read and construed by reference first to Article 4 because Malaysia is governed by constitutional supremacy, unlike the United Kingdom but like India, the United States, Canada and Ireland. This was the same view the Chief Justice took.

Her Ladyship expressed that Article 4(1) had two components: first, it provided for constitutional supremacy; and second, it provided for all laws which are inconsistent with any provision of the Federal Constitution to be declared void, but only to the extent of its consistency. Her Ladyship continued, clarifying that the first component was well established starting with the decision by Suffian LP in Ah Thian v Government of Malaysia [1976] 2 MLJ 112. The second component of Article 4(1) gives “‘bite’ and ‘life’ to the declared supremacy of the Federal Constitution” by enforcing the supremacy of the Federal Constitution ([263]). Her Ladyship opined that without the second component, the Federal Constitution would be reduced to a series of theoretical values and philosophies. To that extent, her Ladyship held that from Article 4(1) flowed the twin fundamental pillars of a constitutional democracy: the rule of law and the separation of powers. Article 4(1), as her Ladyship elaborated, functioned as the root for the conferment of judicial power as articulated further in Article 121 ([270]) and further meant that Article 121(1) must be construed harmoniously with Article 4(1) ([307]). Her Ladyship’s view on Article 4(1) would over time be recognised as seminal and a point to which she would return to in consequent decisions.

Accordingly, the ouster clause in s 59A of the Immigration Acts was unconstitutional for, if given its intended effect, it would insulate any acts of persons or bodies acting under Immigration Acts from review under Article 4(1) of the Federal Constitution, encroaching on the powers encapsulated in Article 4(1) in its insulation.

Further reference was made by Justice Pathmanathan to the fact that the Reid Commission derogated from any suggestion that judicial powers were intended to be subject to federal law. For context, the majority’s decision, delivered by Abdul Rahman Sebli FCJ, held that the intention of the Reid Commission was that ‘jurisdiction and powers conferred unto a court were matters purely within the legislative powers of the Federation’ ([538]). As such, what the appeal turned on was the scope for enforcement of fundamental rights, the remedy of which should be governed by ‘ordinary law’: s 59A’s ouster clause was perceived to only oust the availability of remedy for enforcement of rights and not oust the exercise of judicial power ([542] - [543]).

Nonetheless, with s 59A’s intended blanket immunity against judicial scrutiny cast aside, Justice Pathmanathan adjudicated the Director General’s decision to blacklist a well-known chairperson of a NGO from traveling abroad for being a person who had “‘memburuk nama Kerajaan’” (tarnish or criticize the Government) as wrongful.

==== CTEB & Anor v Ketua Pengarah Pendaftaran Negara, Malaysia & Ors [2021] 4 MLJ 236 ====
In a 4-3 split with the majority dismissing the appeal, Justice Pathmanathan delivered one of three dissents to grant citizenship to a minor male, CTEB, born to a Malaysian citizen father and a Filipino citizen mother. At the time of his birth, his parents were not married. Five months later, they legally registered their marriage in Malaysia and made Malaysia their home.

Though writing only a short dissenting judgment in support of the Chief Justice’s dissenting judgment, her Ladyship delivered a cogent judgment on constitutional interpretation, particularly where supplemental provisions of the Federal Constitution were involved, in context of Malaysia’s status as a nation practicing constitutional supremacy. On the facts, her Ladyship cast doubt at whether the citizenship provision under Article 14(1)(b) of the Federal Constitution could ever be construed in a way that condoned illegitimacy discrimination and gender discrimination.

The Court of Appeal and the High Court had dismissed CTEB’s bid for citizenship based on their reading of Article 14(1)(b). In Justice Pathmanathan’s view, the facts brought to the fore the following issues: (i) the correct construction of citizenship by operation of law provisions in the Federal Constitution (Article 14(1)(b) and the supplementary provisions of s 1 of Part II of the Second Schedule and s 17 of Part III of the Second Schedule, collectively ‘Constitutional Citizenship Provisions’); and (ii) whether by adopting a construction that precludes a child from citizenship by operation of law under Article 14(1)(b), whether Article 8 of the Federal Constitution’s prohibition against gender discrimination is contravened.

Her Ladyship began her analysis by referring to precedent that held that the Federal Constitution cannot be interpreted in a narrow and pedantic manner but rather in a broad, liberal and expansive sense: ‘[t]his is because the Federal Constitution… is a living and organic document which is constantly being examined, explained and developed’ ([222]). Having laid down the basic tenets of Malaysia’s parliamentary democracy, to reflect the basic way of life enjoyed and practiced by the people of Malaysia, Justice Pathamanathan viewed any interpretation of the Federal Constitution that detracted from such basic tenets as being unacceptable ([223]). As such, the citizenship provisions in question could not be read down to deny persons from their basic rights. In her Ladyship’s own words ([224]),

"[T]he [Federal Constitution] sets out the framework for government and its objects and the principles of government ought not to be abrogated by the use of meagre and inadequate technical rules or grammar. As I have stated elsewhere the function of a judge is not to adopt a grammarian approach in the construction of statutes, far less the [Federal Constitution]."

Justice Pathmanathan referred to Malaysia’s status as a nation practicing constitutional supremacy within a government of parliamentary democracy, notwithstanding that it is not the function of a court to place an unnatural or forced meaning to the provisions of the Federal Constitution or fill a gap that does not exist.

As to the proper interpretation of the Constitutional Citizenship Provisions, her Ladyship pointed to the fact that s 17 of Part III of the Second Schedule (which states that all references in Part III to a person’s parent are only in reference to a person’s mother where that person is illegitimate) is only a supplemental provision and cannot revise or drastically modify a governing section of transmission of citizenship by descent as per Article 14(1)(b). As a matter of constitutional interpretation, Justice Pathamanthan iterated it was wrong to use supplementary or interpretive provisions to override, derogate from or abrogate from express provisions of the Federal Constitution ([249] ; [267]). Furthermore, Justice Pathamanthan pointed out to the fact that the manner in which the majority and courts below construed the Federal Constitution conflicted with Article 8 (prohibition against discrimination). This conflict was itself evidence of erroneously invoking and giving supplementary provisions (e.g., s 17 of Part III) unnecessary significance in an effort to impose a requirement of legitimacy for citizenship that was never intended since the Federal Constitution’s inception ([274]).

==== Perbadanan Pengurusan Trellises & Ors v Datuk Bandar Kuala Lumpur & Ors [2023] 3 MLJ 829 ====
Widely recognised as an important decision that reconceptualises the law on standing in Malaysia, Justice Pathmanathan authored the decision of the Federal Court to overrule the restrictive approach to locus standi, as had been the case since the decision of Government of Malaysia v Lim Kit Siang [1988] 2 MLJ 12, where plaintiffs were required to demonstrate particularised injury to private rights when moving a court to judicially review an authority’s decision.

Her Ladyship's judgment aligned Malaysian jurisprudence with contemporary Commonwealth principles by recognising that persons with a genuine interest in the matter, particularly where issues of public importance are engaged, should be accorded standing to bring their claim. The decision is widely recognised as having modernised Malaysia's approach to standing in constitutional and public law matters, becoming precedent for subsequent constitutional and administrative judicial reviews.

Justice Pathmanathan’s decision in Trellises is also considered seminal in its consideration of locus standi in environmental law cases, a point that arose given Lim Kit Siang’s fixation on judicial review litigants having to show ‘special’ damage, i.e., that they suffered additional or unique damage in comparison to the average person. In doing so, Justice Pathmanathan referred to the UK Supreme Court decision of Walton, where it was recognised that while sometimes ‘an individual may be personally affected in his private interests by the environmental issues to which an application for planning permission may give rise…some environmental issues… are not of that character (Walton, [152]). However, a planning proposal not affecting any individual’s property rights does not exempt it from judicial scrutiny and the analogy of a planning proposal that would impede the route taken by an osprey to its favourite fishing loch was employed by the Supreme Court to illustrate such a point. Justice Nallini employed the same analogy, asking rhetorically ‘who will speak for the hornbill?’if standing was to be construed narrowly ([462]).

In the context of planning law under the Federal Territories Act 1982, Justice Pathmanathan unconventionally departed from English planning law after observing that Malaysian planning law went one step further than its English counterpart act by mandating that structure plans and local plans were to be gazetted after its creation and consultation with the public. As such, Justice Pathmanathan overruled the precedent that the Datuk Bandar (mayor of Kuala Lumpur) was not required to ‘slavishly comply’ with development plans but need only ‘have regard’ to it. Instead, ‘continuity, control and regulation of town planning… is achieved when a development plan is gazetted and given the force of law’ and thus, ‘‘slavish compliance’ is required’ ([167]). On the facts, Justice Pathmanathan observed that the gazetted Kuala Lumpur Local Plan departed significantly from its draft version, and that the impugned planning permission on a public park also deviated from the Kuala Lumpur Structure Plan.

==== Dhinesh A/L Tanaphll v Lembaga Pencegahan Jenayah & Ors [2022] 3 MLJ 356 ====
In dealing with the constitutionality of an ouster clause in s 15B of the Prevention of Crime Act 1959 (POCA), Justice Pathmanathan reconciled conflicting authorities to establish that Malaysia's Federal Constitution contains fundamental features beyond Parliament's amending power. As such, the ouster clause contained in s 15B that prevented judicial review of any act or decision by the Prevention of Crime Board (the Board) was unconstitutional for its net effect would be to abrogate and limit judicial power as enshrined in Article 5(2) of the Federal Constitution and its review powers under Article 4.

Dhinesh’s principled interpretation of Article 4(1) gave far-reaching consequences for judicial review, enabling courts post-Dhinesh to assess not just procedural compliance in detentions but also the substantive merits of an authority’s decision.

Dhinesh also saw Justice Pathmanathan reflect on the majority ruling of Maria Chin 1 MLJ 750 whereby the majority upheld the legality of the ouster clause under the Immigration Act, the rationale being that the ouster clause did not contravene any particular provision of the Federal Constitution. In Justice Pathmanathan’s view, the majority’s rationale represented a retrograde departure from a trilogy of decisions (Semenyih Jaya Sdn Bhd v Pentadbir Tanah Daerah Hulu Langat and another case [2017] 3 MLJ 561, Indira Gandhi a/p Mutho v Pengarah Jabatan Agama Islam Perak & Ors and other appeals [2018] 1 MLJ 545, Alma Nudo Atenza v PP and another appeal [2019] 4 MLJ 1 as well as Sivarasa Rasiah v Badan Peguam Malaysia [2010] 2 MLJ 333) that upheld the sanctity of doctrines such as the doctrine of separation of powers and the independence of the judiciary, particularly in the context of Article 121’s amendment by the Constitution (Amendment) Act 1988 (the 1988 Amendment).

The 1988 Amendment came after the Federal Court’s decision in Public Prosecutor v Dato’ Yap Peng [1987] 2 MLJ 311 where the issue was whether s 418(A) of the Criminal Procedure Code encroached judicial power. The Federal Court there held that s 418(A) did so encroach and therefore was void for inconsistency with the Federal Constitution under Article 4(1).

Pre-amendment, Article 121(1) read:

121 Judicial Power of the Federation
(1) There shall be two High Courts of co-ordinate jurisdiction and status namely —
...
And such inferior courts as may be provided by federal law and the High Courts and inferior courts shall have such jurisdiction and powers as may be conferred by or under federal law.

Post-amendment, Article 121(1) read:

121 Judicial Power of the Federation
(1) Subject to Clause (2) the judicial power of the Federation shall be vested in two High Courts of co-ordinate jurisdiction and status, namely —
...
And in such inferior courts as may be provided by federal law.

Justice Pathmanathan analysed the origins and history of the basic structure doctrine, both in Malaysia and abroad, and considered constitutionalism in relation to constitutional amendments, before concluding that as amendment powers are a constituted power there can be no such thing as an amendment power without limits. Indeed, Justice Pathamanthan’s key contribution in Dhinesh is to demonstrate that criticisms that this amounts to adopting a foreign doctrine is incorrect; the basic structure doctrine is encapsulated and lives within Article 4 of the Malaysian Constitution. Put another way, the judicial power that results in the invalidity of ouster clauses is derived from Article 4 and not a freestanding basic structure doctrine.

==== Perbadanan Pengurusan Sunrise Garden Kondominium v Sunway City (Penang) Sdn Bhd & Ors And Another Appeal [2023] 2 MLJ 621 ====
In an appeal between landowners and the Majlis Bandaraya Pulau Pinang and a developer over a grant of planning permission on a hill slope, Justice Pathmanathan scrutinised town planning law under the Town and Country Planning Act 1976 (TCPA).

After analysing how the TCPA required public participation and awareness, to the extent that any amendment too is subject to public participation and awareness, Justice Pathmanathan held the local authority’s use of a special guideline (Pelan Dasar) produced under previous legislation and formed without public consultations as enshrined under TCPA meant that the local authority acted ultra vires its powers under the TCPA. As such, Justice Pathmanathan overturned the decision of the High Court and Court of Appeal in finding that the impugned planning permission was void.

Justice Pathmanathan also deliberated on the extent local authorities are required to give reasons for their decisions. On the facts, the local authority’s decision to develop on hill lands did not comply with the Structure Plan and therefore warranted very strong reasons as to why the local authority chose to deviate from the Structure Plan. As such, Justice Pathmanathan held the appellants, neighbouring landowners, had a right to be told the reasons why the local authority departed from the Structure Plan, especially with the public interest element being implicit in the TCPA 1976.

==== Kerajaan Malaysia v LFL Sdn. Bhd & Another Appeal [2024] MLJU 3015 ====
In 2020, a Malaysian NGO, Lawyers for Liberty, published a press statement on its website stating that the method of execution of the death penalty in Singapore was unlawful and brutal. After receiving a Correction Direction from the Government of Singapore, whereby failure to comply would amount to an offence under the Singaporean Protection from Online Falsehoods and Manipulation Act 2019 (POFMA), the Malaysian NGO sought declaratory and injunctive reliefs from the Malaysian courts (the Suit). Before the High Court, the Government of Malaysia successfully struck out the Suit. On appeal, the Court of Appeal reversed the High Court’s striking out and ordered the Suit to be remitted back to the High Court.

On appeal, the decision represented the first time a Malaysian apex court deliberating on In this decision, Justice Pathmanathan addressed two major weighty questions of public international law: first, (i) whether conduct by the Singaporean Minister of Home Affairs constituted sovereign action protected by state immunity; and second a, what is the proper approach to assessing (ii) when extraterritorial legislation would trigger that engaged Malaysian constitutional protections.

In ordering that the Suit be remitted back to the High Court to be heard only on the issue of the extraterritorial jurisdiction of POFMA in relation to a Malaysian citizen, Hher Ladyship's judgment decidedly marked a marked a notable adeliberate shift in jurisdictional principles. Justice Pathmanathan departed from the permissive approach as termed from the decision of in SS Lotus (France v Turkey) (1927) PCIJ Series A, No. 10 (The Lotus Case), which had whereby states are said to be entitled to exercise prescriptive jurisdiction (i.e., a country’s ability to make its law applicable to persons, conduct, relations or interest) provided there is no prohibitive rule to the contrary. allowed the exercise of prescriptive jurisdiction absent a prohibitive rule, and instead .

Instead, the more affirmed more modern jurisprudence requiring a recognised basis in international law should a state wish to project its prescriptive jurisdiction for the exercise of extraterritorial prescriptive jurisdiction was affirmed by Justice Pathmanathan in an approach acknowledged and praised by scholars worldwide.

==== Pendaftar Mualaf Negeri Perlis & Ors v Loh Siew Hong and another appeal [2025] 2 MLJ 324 ====
In dismissing the Registrar of Mualafs Perlis’s leave application, Justice Pathmanathan reiterated the principle that, notwithstanding a syariah court had full power to decide on matters within its jurisdiction, where a syariah court’s decision fell outside its jurisdiction, the civil court retained its supervisory power to correct and set aside decisions.

In the context of unilateral religious conversions, if a syariah court incorrectly deemed an ab initio case (ie, where a person seeks a declaration that they were never a Muslim) as a renunciation case (i.e., where a person seeks a declaration they were no longer a Muslim), a civil court still retained the power to step in and resolve the matter. The decision is understood to provide clarity on the interplay between civil and syariah jurisdictions.

Furthermore, her Ladyship held that matters of constitutional and statutory interpretation, as well as review of the actions of public authorities, still fell within the jurisdiction of civil courts. Therefore, if a statutory provision stated that a certificate of conversion to Islam was conclusive proof, this only related to the facts stated in the certificate, i.e. that the relevant names were registered with the Registrar of Muallafs.

=== Corporate & Commercial Law ===
==== Ong Leong Chiou & Anor v Keller (M) Sdn Bhd & Ors [2021] 3 MLJ 622 ====
In Ong Leong Chiou, Justice Pathamanathan engaged with the UK Supreme Court decision of Prest (Appellant) v Petrodel Resources Limited & Others (Respondents) [2013] UKSC 34, distilling the rationale from Lord Sumption and Lady Hale’s opinions and, after consideration, applying them to a complex factual matrix with clarifications on how they are to be synthesised and applied in Malaysia moving forward.

The decision arose from the construction of a shopping mall, Melawati Mall. The project was developed by Sime Darby Capitalmalls Asia (Melawati Mall) Sdn Bhd who appointed Bina Puri Sdn Bhd as the main contractor. Bina Puri subcontracted the substructural works to Perfect Solution Sdn Bhd. Perfect Solution, in turn, subcontracted the works to PS Bina Sdn Bhd, a newly incorporated company with directors/shareholders that included a one Tony Ong. PS Bina then engaged the plaintiff, Keller (M) Sdn Bhd, to execute some construction works.

The plaintiff brought a claim for non-payment of empty bore works (EBW), totalling to RM7,462,720.19. The key findings of the trial judge included the non-provision of a complete Bill of Quantities (BOQ) - a page was missing that stated EBW would not be paid by Bina Puri. Despite knowing EBW was excluded from payment under Bina Puri’s contract, Tony Ong (through PS Bina) issued a letter of award to the plaintiff falsely representing that EBW would be paid. Tony Ong controlled both Perfect Solution and PS Bina, using the latter as a facade to evade liability. No disclosure was made to the plaintiff and assurances of payment were repeatedly made. The trial judge at the High Court held that PS Bina was liable for breach of contract. Tony Ong and Perfect Solution was also made jointly and severally liable on grounds of fraudulent concealment, a sham corporate structure and there being a single economic unit (payments and operations were intermingled between Perfect Solution and PS BIna under Tony Ong’s control). The High Court pierced the corporate veil due to there being equitable fraud.

Her Ladyship affirmed that Malaysian precedent correctly recognises fraud as a basis for disregarding corporate personality, where established. This body of law relating to fraud, however, subsists outside the doctrine of ‘piercing’ the corporate veil as explained in Prest. To this end, the distinction between the concealment and evasion categories as advanced by Lord Sumption in Prest are important as they enable the court to analyse with better accuracy on which the corporate personality is being disregarded. Her Ladyship endorsed the concealment principle, explaining that it does not pierce the veil of incorporation but allows the court only to look behind the corporate personality to ascertain true facts. The evasion principle was also endorsed though Justice Pathmanathan cautioned invoking it would involve considerable obstacles, as first it was necessary to ascertain if there was a legal right against a person in control of a company that existed independently of the company’s involvement and that the company was used so as to frustrate enforcement.

Her Ladyship’s decision clarified the manner in which Lord Sumption’s concealment and evasion categories applied to the facts of the appeal, given the factual matrix was complicated by the fact that two corporate entities were involved. Her Ladyship held that the application of the doctrine is better understood as being applied to PS Bina, the ‘sham’ company created to evade liability for the debt. Liability against Perfect Solution was better understood applying the principles of principal and agent ([72]).

Notwithstanding, Justice Pathamanathan recognised Lord Sumption’s analysis was not accepted in its entirety by the seven member bench of the UK Supreme Court nor had subsequent case law resolved the difficulty of applying Lord Sumption’s categories. Accordingly, her Ladyship held Lady Hale’s concurring opinion as apt, that cases would hardly fall neatly into the two categories. Instead, Justice Pathmanathan agreed that where the piercing of the corporate veil is sought to try to pin the liability of the controller of the company onto the company itself, the utilisation of agency and principal doctrine and ‘directing mind’ would be more appropriate ([99](e)]).

==== Bursa Malaysia Securities Bhd v Mohd Afrizan bin Husain [2022] 3 MLJ 450 ====
In Bursa Malaysia, Justice Pathmanathan authored the decision of the Federal Court that considered the question of law concerning the interpretation of the Listing Requirements and the Main Market Listing Requirements (collectively, the Listing Requirements).

The respondent was a court-appointed liquidator of Wintoni, a company listed on the ACE Market of Bursa Securities at the material time. Upon the liquidator agreeing to comply with the ACE Market Listing Rules (AMLR) vide a Letter of Undertaking (LOU), Bursa Securities continued to allow the listing of Wintoni on the Official List and was not delisted. Some time later, the liquidator failed to comply with the AMLR by failing to announce its financial statements at the required time, among others. Bursa Securities proceeded to publicly reprimand the liquidator. Dissatisfied, the liquidator commenced judicial review against Bursa Securities’ decision to publicly reprimand him for failing to comply with the AMLR. The High Court allowed the liquidator’s judicial review against Bursa Securities on its finding that the obligation to comply with the AMLR and to prepare financial statements were not requirements expressly set out in the Companies Act 2016 and therefore was outside the scope of a liquidator’s powers and duties, among other findings. The Court of Appeal upheld the High Court’s decision but on different grounds, holding that it was mandatory for Bursa Securities to immediately delist Wintoni upon a winding-up order being granted against it. The Court of Appeal did, however, comment in passing that liquidators have to observe the requirements imposed on them by written law including the Capital Markets and Services Act 2007 and the AMLR.

On appeal to the Federal Court, Justice Pathmanathan held that interpretations of the Listing Rules and the CMSA 2007 must first be considered holistically and purposively. Her Ladyship referred to Bursa Securities’ primary duty of ensuring an orderly and fair market and to act in the public’s interest as expressed in s 11 of the CMSA 2007. As such, rule 16.11(2) of the AMLR/Main Market Listing Rules (MMLR) did not impose a mandatory obligation on Bursa Securities to de-list a listed corporation immediately upon a winding-up order being served against it. Bursa Securities had the discretion to delay the de-listing of the company where doing so would be in the public’s interest. Furthermore, her Ladyship held that rule 2.07(2) of the AMLR and 2.06(2) of the MMLR allows Bursa to waive or modify compliance with the listing requirements if such compliance would not meet its statutory duties expressed under the CMSA 2007 nor was in the spirit of the AMLR.

Therefore, Bursa was entitled to waive or modify the effect of r 16.11(2) of the MMLR, that Bursa ‘shall’ delist a listed company upon its winding up, even if it was read in its most extreme form of imposing a positive obligation upon Bursa to de-list.

Justice Pathmanathan also took the opportunity to remind of the complete chaos that would occur in the capital market if individuals, such as the liquidator in the instance, could choose to undertake their own interpretation of the rules. To try to avoid unequivocal legal obligations of disclosure in the interests of both Wintoni and the investing public, by suggesting that Bursa was bound to delist Wintoni so as to absolve him from any need to comply with the LOU, was ‘unacceptable conduct on part of an officer of court, from whom the highest standards of integrity are expected’ as expressed by her Ladyship ([103]).

==== Low Cheng Teik & Ors vV Low Ean Mee [2024] 5 MLJ 580 ====
In Low Cheng Teik, Justice Pathmanathan issued a comprehensive decision on behalf of the Federal Court analysing the difference between oppression actions and statutory derivative actions and their respective principles under the Companies Act 2016.

The facts of the appeal involved a one SNE Marketing Sdn Bhd, a nutritional supplements company, jointly owned by four shareholders comprising the respondent (50%) and three appellants (50% combined). Between 2003-2018, the company generated over RM1 billion in revenue, with the respondent receiving RM15 million in dividends.

In 2018, the First Appellant transferred SNE’s valuable trademarks to an unrelated company owned by his daughter, SNE Global, for just RM10. The Respondent, unaware of the transfer, issued a statutory notice of her intention to seek leave to initiate a derivative action on behalf of the Company under s 348(2) of the Act. The Respondent did not file a derivative action but instead, consequently filed an oppression action against the Appellants, seeking court orders that the Appellants purchase her shares at a value determined by an auditor.

After tracing the origins of oppression and derivative actions stemming from Foss v Harbottle (i.e., the proper plaintiff rule and the majority rule principle), Justice Pathmanathan expanded on the subsequent history and utility of each remedial action. The statutory remedy of oppression, her Ladyship clarified, was formulated for instances when an act of is targeted directly and specifically against one or more minority shareholders, resulting in injury to them in their personal capacity. The statutory derivative action, however, was formulated to allow a shareholder to bring an action in the name and on behalf of a company to remedy a wrong inflicted on a company. Her Ladyship offered the practical context that statutory derivative actions are envisaged when the majority shareholders fail to rectify the harm inflicted, so the company’s powers to enforce its rights is delegated to its minority shareholder to enforce on its behalf through a derivative action ([77]).

Her Ladyship, in her decision, offered practical guidance as to how a plaintiff should choose between the two remedies ([79]):

"[T]he question to be asked when deciding on which action to pursue is this: against whom has the alleged harm been caused? If the harm has caused injury to one or more shareholders, then the oppression action is proper. If the harm is to the company alone, a derivative action is the appropriate cause of action."

Her Ladyship held that the two distinct statutory provisions warranted the conclusion that each section created a different cause of action, with oppression actions empowering the grant of greater remedies than a derivative action. The distinction between the two actions was therefore necessary to prevent shareholders from using oppression actions as an abusive tactical manoeuvre. Prior to her Ladyship’s call for a differentiation between the two remedies, the two remedies were often pursued interchangeably in Malaysia.

Justice Pathmanathan then laid down a legal test to determine whether a shareholder’s grievance should proceed as an oppression action or derivative action, notwithstanding her Ladyship cautioning that the test was not a blueprint but only as guidance to future courts and litigants.

The key questions to consider are:

1. What is the act or omission that the one (or more) shareholder complains of? The act, series of acts, or omission, must be identified.

2. Can the act(s) or omission(s) be characterised as being:
a) Oppressive to;
b) In disregard of the interests of;
c) Unfairly discriminatory against; or
d) Otherwise prejudicial to one or more of the shareholders?

3. Does the cause of action vest in the shareholder or in the company?

4. Who has suffered loss or damage from the wrong done — the shareholder in their capacity as a shareholder, or the company?

5. Is the loss suffered by the shareholder as plaintiff separate and distinct to the plaintiff in their capacity as a shareholder, or is it a loss suffered by all the shareholders?

Justice Pathmanathan acknowledged how occasionally, a wrong done to the company may concurrently cause harm to its shareholders. Termed as the ‘reflective loss principle’, the rationale is that the diminution of its shares cannot be recovered personally by a shareholder because any recovery by the company would restore the shareholder’s position; any further recovery would tantamount to double recovery. However, her Ladyship recognised that the reflective loss principle may not apply where the deprivation of dividends was directed personally against the shareholder such that only he, and not anyone else, suffered loss.

Applying the facts of the appeal to the legal test conceived, her Ladyship held that because the wrong complained of was the wrongful assignment of the trademarks which belonged to the company, the wrongful act was not prejudicial to the Respondent alone but affected the company as a whole. As such, the Respondent’s claim ought to have been pursued by way of a statutory derivative action. Praised as a correct and principled application of the reflective loss principle, Justice Pathamanthan’s judgement in Low Cheng Teik was a necessary clarification of the law on the subject.

==== Detik Ria Sdn Bhd v Prudential Corporation Holdings Ltd & Anor [2025] 3 MLJ 22 ====
Justice Pathmanathan delivered the decision of the court over a high-value commercial dispute involving claims worth RM 4.2 billion (approximately USD1 billion).

The facts of the case and its appeal saw her Ladyship adjudicate on the remedial obligations of parties upon a contract that was or became void under s 66 of Malaysia’s Contracts Act 1950.

Her Ladyship began by stating that whilst the Contracts Act codified large parts of English law, it nevertheless was not a carbon copy of the English common law of that time. Therefore, Malaysian courts first recourse should not be to English common law without first appreciating s 66.

After considering with the evolving common law frameworks advanced articulated in the UK per Patel v Mirza (UK Supreme Court) and Singapore per Ochroid Trading, Justice Pathmanathan issued out authoritative dicta after observing s 66’s unparalleled remedial breadth as compared to its English law equivalent. Her Ladyship’s decision was also important for its dicta that s 66 is still applicable where there is part performance of a contract and the contract is subsequently discovered to be void.

After a compendious study of various commonwealth statute equivalents of the Contracts Act and academic texts, such as s 65 of the Indian Contracts Act and the Roman principle of condictio causa data causa non secuta, her Ladyship held that s 66 is meant to reflect a broad and general principle of restoration and that a court is empowered to restore parties to the position they were in pre-contravening transaction ([161]). Accordingly, the act of putting parties back to the position they were in before the illegal activity thwarts the illegal objective instead of assisting it. Justice Pathmanathan also cautioned against the conflation of ‘restoration’ with ‘restitution’ because of the latter’s connotation with the separate law of unjust enrichment.

Nonetheless, Justice Pathmanathan also took the opportunity to formulate a non-exhaustive guide on determining whether a s 66 remedy was engaged.

(i) First, the centrality of the illegality in the context of the statute breached. For instance, the Insurance Act 1996 and the illegality after the parties failed to obtain approval from the Minister of Finance.

(ii) Second, the proportionality of denying s 66 relief to the illegality. The factors to consider range from whether the contract was performed to the extent of the parties’ culpability for the illegality. Her Ladyship emphasised that the presence of knowledge is not a complete bar to a s 66 remedy but is an important factor when determining culpability.

==== V Medical Services M Sdn Bhd v Swissray Asia Healthcare Co Ltd [2025] 2 MLJ 744 ====
In Swissray, Justice Pathmanathan confronted a key jurisprudential divide within the Commonwealth regarding winding-up petitions governed by arbitration agreements. The central question was whether to follow the approach of Singapore’s and Hong Kong’s highest courts or to adopt the Privy Council’s reasoning in Sian Participation Corp (in liquidation) v Halimeda International Ltd [2024] UKPC 16 (Sian).

Her Ladyship ultimately endorsed Sian but significantly expanded its analytical framework. Justice Pathmanathan spent much time in particular emphasizing the fact that private contractual rights should not be subordinated to the public interest that underlies the insolvency process. Indeed, her Ladyship's reasoning was referred to with approval by Lady Arden in her 2025 Asian Arbitration Lecture at SMU.

This judgment marked the first time a Commonwealth apex court grappled with the issue following Sian Participation, providing much-needed clarity on the interplay between arbitration and insolvency regimes.

== Honours ==
=== Honours of Malaysia ===
- Malaysia
  - Commander of the Order of Loyalty to the Crown of Malaysia (PSM) – Tan Sri (2023)
- Federal Territory (Malaysia)
  - Commander of the Order of the Territorial Crown (PMW) – Datuk (2014)
