= Graduate Diploma in English and Hong Kong Law =

The Graduate Diploma in English and Hong Kong Law (GDEHKL) is a Hong Kong graduate diploma programme that allows students that did not take law as an undergraduate degree (i.e. "non-law students") to "convert" to law, before going onto a professional qualification course and ultimately legal training.

The GDEHKL is a localised mutation of the Common Professional Examination of England and Wales (CPE), or Postgraduate Diploma in Law (PGDL). It is jointly offered by the University of Hong Kong's School of Professional and Continuing Education (HKU SPACE) as the course operator, and Manchester Metropolitan University as the qualification awarding institution. The completion of the course qualifies students to proceed to legal training courses in Hong Kong and England & Wales or to many LL.M. programmes. Graduates of the GDEHKL include Justice Anthea Pang Po-kam of the Court of Appeal of the High Court, Justice Linda Chan Ching-fan of the Court of First Instance of the High Court and Tonyee Chow Hang-tung, a Vice Chairman of the Hong Kong Alliance in Support of Patriotic Democratic Movements of China who has been charged and denied bail under Hong Kong's National Security Law. Justice Pang sent a message to the 2021 Graduation Ceremony of the GDEHKL.

The GDEHKL is the only postgraduate law programme in Hong Kong which substantially satisfies both the requirements for entry into the Postgraduate Certificate in Laws (PCLL) for those who intend to practice law in Hong Kong, and also the requirements for entry into legal training courses for those who intend to practice in England and Wales. The GDEHKL is recognised by the Standing Committee on Legal Education and Training as demonstrating competence in the three Top-up Subjects on Hong Kong law required for entry to the PCLL. Graduates of the GDEHKL who continue on to take the additional MMU LLB year after the CPE will have passed all necessary law subjects required for PCLL eligibility.

The GDEHKL is an exempted course under a Hong Kong law known as the Non-Local Higher and Professional Education (Regulation) Ordinance, which states that it is a matter of discretion for individual employers to recognize any qualification to which this course may lead.

== See also ==
- Postgraduate Certificate in Laws
