= Common Professional Examination =

Postgraduate law course in England and Wales

The Common Professional Examination/Postgraduate Diploma in Law (CPE/PGDL) is a postgraduate law course in England and Wales taken by non-law graduates (graduates who do not have a qualifying law degree for legal practice) wishing to become either a solicitor or barrister in England and Wales. It is being replaced by the Solicitors Qualifying Examination (SQE) which was introduced on 1 September 2021.

The course allows non-law graduates to convert to law after university (exceptions exist for non-graduates depending on circumstances). It is commonly known as a "law conversion course". The course is designed as an intense programme covering roughly the same content as a law degree.

Most CPE courses award a diploma and are often titled Postgraduate Diploma in Law (PGDL).

The CPE is one (full-time) or two (part-time) years long, and successful candidates may proceed to either the Legal Practice Course (LPC) for solicitors or the Barrister Training Course (BTC) for barristers.

== UK course providers ==
In 1977, the former Inns of Court School of Law (now merged into City, University of London) launched their CPE/PGDL programme, which was the first of its kind in England and Wales.

The PGDL tends to be offered through private institutions or universities. The largest course providers are BPP Law School, City Law School and The University of Law.

The PGDL is also offered by several British universities including London South Bank University, Cardiff University, the University of East Anglia, Keele University, the University of Sheffield, the University of Brighton, the University of Sussex, Swansea University, Birmingham City University, Manchester Metropolitan University, London Metropolitan University, the University of Westminster, University of the West of England, Middlesex University, De Montfort University and the University of East London as well as Oxford Brookes University.

== Hong Kong ==
Graduates of GDL are eligible to apply for PCLL (see below) in Hong Kong if they passed the required PCLL Conversion Examinations, for example, Hong Kong Constitutional Law, Hong Kong Land Law.

In Hong Kong a localised mutation of the CPE known as the Graduate Diploma in English and Hong Kong Law is also recognised for the purpose of admission to the Postgraduate Certificate in Laws (PCLL) course, which can be seen as the local equivalent to the LPC/BPTC and is a prerequisite to become a solicitor or barrister in Hong Kong. Since 2008, all graduates of overseas universities are required to demonstrate competence in three Top-up Subjects on Hong Kong law before they can enter the PCLL, usually by sitting conversion examinations in these three subjects. However graduates of the GDEHKL do not need to sit these three conversion examinations because the course is recognised by the Standing Committee on Legal Education and Training as demonstrating competence in the three Top-up Subjects on Hong Kong law.

=== Graduate Diploma in English and Hong Kong Law ===
The CPE/GDEHKL is offered by the University of Hong Kong's School of Professional and Continuing Education (HKU SPACE) in Hong Kong jointly with Manchester Metropolitan University (MMU). Graduates of the GDEHKL who continue on to take the additional MMU LLB year after the CPE/GDEHKL will have passed all necessary law subjects required for PCLL eligibility. The GDEHKL is an exempted course under a Hong Kong law known as the Non-Local Higher and Professional Education (Regulation) Ordinance, which states that it is a matter of discretion for individual employers to recognize any qualification to which this course may lead.

== See also ==
- Legal education
- Trainee solicitor
- Pupillage
