= Tsinghua University School of Law =

Law school of Tsinghua University, China

Coordinates: 39.9981°N 116.3323°E

- 清华大学法学院
- Type: Public law school
- Established: 1929; 96 years ago
- Parent institution: Tsinghua University
- Dean: Zhenmin Wang
- Location: Beijing, China
- Campus: Urban
- Website: law.tsinghua.edu.cn

Chinese name
- Simplified Chinese: 清华大学法学院
- Traditional Chinese: 清華大學法學院
Transcriptions
Standard Mandarin
- Hanyu Pinyin: Qīnghuá Dàxué Fǎxuéyuàn

The Tsinghua University School of Law is the law school of Tsinghua University.

As of 2016, it is ranked 2nd among law schools in mainland China.
