= List of law schools in Hong Kong =

This is a list of law schools in Hong Kong.

- School of Law, City University of Hong Kong
- Faculty of Law, The Chinese University of Hong Kong
- Faculty of Law, The University of Hong Kong

== See also ==
- List of law schools in China
