= Fisheries Law Centre =

The Fisheries Law Centre (FLC) is a grassroots non-profit research centre headquartered in Vancouver, British Columbia, Canada. Although FLC is based in Canada, its outreach is global with researchers located in many countries around the world. The Fisheries Law Centre is a non-profit research organisation focused on legal issues related to fisheries management, seafood regulation, and aquaculture law.

FLC's research is primarily focused on fisheries law, that is, the legal analysis of fisheries management schemes, seafood laws, and aquaculture regulations. Their research projects on fisheries management schemes studies catch shares (e.g. Individual Transferable quotas); Illegal, Unreported and Unregulated fisheries. RFMOs, TURFs, and MPAs. Their seafood studies focuses on sustainable seafood, sustainable and ecolabelling certification schemes, labelling requirement, traceability, and regulatory affairs. Their aquaculture studies primarily focus on fish feed regulations. FLC publishes a quarterly update on legal developments in fisheries law and runs one of the only fisheries law blogs.

In addition to conducting research, FLC offers internships and volunteer opportunities for aspiring fisheries law advocates. These internships provide students interested in fisheries law with lectures and workshops, as well as numerous opportunities to engage in in-depth conversations with fishermen and leaders in coastal communities. Furthermore, FLC offers continuing legal education (CLE) courses across North America. FLC is an active participant in the fishery community at conferences and law schools around the world. Adam Soliman is the director of FLC and one of very few scholars that focus on fisheries law.

== See also ==
- Fish markets
- Fisheries law
- Fisheries management
- Fisheries science
- Illegal, unreported and unregulated fishing
- Overfishing
- Sustainable seafood
