= City University of Hong Kong School of Law =

Law school in Hong Kong

Coordinates: 22.3377°N 114.1740°E

- Established: 1987 as the Department of Law
- School type: School
- Dean: Professor Lin Feng
- Location: Kowloon Tong, Kowloon, Hong Kong
- Enrollment: 1,074
- Faculty: 31
- Website: http://www.cityu.edu.hk/slw

City University of Hong Kong School of Law
- Traditional Chinese: 法律學院
- Simplified Chinese: 法律学院
Transcriptions
Yue: Cantonese
- Yale Romanization: Faat leuht hohk yuhn
- Jyutping: Faat^{3} leot^{6} hok^{6} jyun^{6}

The School of Law of City University of Hong Kong was founded in 1987, as the second law school in Hong Kong.

== History ==
The Department of Law was established in 1987, followed by the Department of Professional Legal Education in 1992. In March 1993, the two departments were brought together to merge as the Faculty of Law, and later renamed as the School of Law since the administrations of the two departments were unified.

The school publishes Asia Pacific Law Review since 1992 and a student-edited City University of Hong Kong Law Review since 2009. The school also has participated in various mooting competitions, having won moots such as ICC Moot and Vis East in 2012, and Willem C. Vis Moot in 2013.

== Notable alumni ==
- Rimsky Yuen SC, former Secretary for Justice
- Eunice Yung, Member of the 6th Legislative Council of Hong Kong
- Paul Tse, Member of the 4th Legislative Council of Hong Kong
- Richard Khaw SC JP, Recorder of the Court of First Instance of the High Court.

== Notable professors ==
- Priscilla Leung, expert in Chinese law and constitutional law, member of the Legislative Council of Hong Kong

== Programmes offered ==
The school offers law degree programs at both the undergraduate and postgraduate levels. Unlike most other common law jurisdictions, both the LLB and the JD operate concurrently in Hong Kong, providing for entry to the legal profession through an undergraduate or postgraduate path.

=== Undergraduate ===
The school offers a full-time four-year Bachelor of Laws (LL.B.) Programme. The degree offers students a general and professional education at the undergraduate level. The School of Law in 2007 launched the Global Legal Education and Awareness Project (G-LEAP). Under G-LEAP, students can opt to study credit-bearing law course during summer term at the Faculty of Law of University College, Oxford.

=== Postgraduate ===
The school offers multiple Postgraduate programs. While J.D. programme is the graduate route in Hong Kong, P.C.LL. is required for admission to the profession. It has established the GLOBAL GATEWAY Programme to provide multi-jurisdictional opportunities for legal study to postgraduate students. This programme offers students the possibility of exchange programme and dual LLM degree from other leading international law schools such as Europe-Asia Research Institute of Aix-Marseille University, University Paris 1 Panthéon-Sorbonne in France, and Université de Fribourg in Switzerland.

- Juris Doctor (J.D.) Programme
- Master of Laws (LL.M.) Programme
- Master of Laws (Renmin University of China) (LL.M.) Programme, in Chinese Law, degree granted by Renmin University of China
- Master of Laws in Arbitration & Dispute Resolution (LLMArbDR) Programme
- Master of Philosophy in Laws (M.Phil.) Programme
- Doctor of Philosophy in Laws (Ph.D.) Programme
- Doctor of Juridical Science (J.S.D.) Programme
- Postgraduate Certificate in Laws (P.C.LL.)

== Ranking ==
=== TIMES World University Subject Rankings (Law) ===
Subject	2018	2019	2020	2021	2022	2023	2024	2025
Law	52	45	25	31	56	51	45	42

=== QS World University Subject Rankings (Top 200) ===
Subject	2018	2019	2020	2021	2022	2023	2024	2025
Law	53	53	53	70	65	84	54	56
