= Postgraduate Certificate in Laws =

Hong Kong legal qualification programme

In Hong Kong, the Postgraduate Certificate in Laws (PCLL; Chinese: 法學專業證書) is an intensive one-year, full-time (or two-year, part-time) professional legal qualification programme. It allows graduates to proceed to legal training in order to qualify to practice as either a barrister or a solicitor in Hong Kong. The "LL." of the abbreviation for the certificate is from the genitive plural legum (of lex, legis f., law).

The programme is similar to the Legal Practice Course or the Bar Professional Training Course in England and Wales, or the Certificate in Legal Practice (Malaysia) in Malaysia, or the Part B of the Bar Examinations in Singapore, which focuses heavily on practical and procedural issues in legal practice, unlike a first degree in law.

== Course providers ==
There are three course providers in Hong Kong:

- The Chinese University of Hong Kong (CUHK) (since September 2008)
- The University of Hong Kong (HKU)
- City University of Hong Kong (CityU)

== Qualification as a lawyer in Hong Kong ==
As in England and Wales, the legal profession in Hong Kong consists of two branches: solicitors and barristers. After successfully completing the PCLL:

- Prospective solicitors go on to complete a two-year training contract as a trainee solicitor to qualify.
- Prospective barristers undertake six months of pupillage under a pupilmaster before being called to the Bar (admitted as a barrister) of Hong Kong, gaining limited rights of audience (limited practice). After six more months of pupillage, he or she can commence full practice.

== PCLL admission requirements ==
To be eligible for admission to the courses leading to the PCLL, an applicant must have completed their Bachelor of Laws (LL.B.) or equivalent legal studies either in Hong Kong or other common law jurisdictions, or, for non-law graduates, have passed the Graduate Diploma in English and Hong Kong Law (GDEHKL) of Hong Kong or the Common Professional Examinations (CPE/GDL) of England and Wales.

Applicant will have to demonstrate competence in the following eleven 'Core' subjects: Contract, Tort, Constitutional Law, Criminal Law, Land Law, Equity, Evidence, Business Associations, and Commercial Law; and three 'Top-up' subjects: Hong Kong Constitutional Law, Hong Kong Legal System and Hong Kong Land Law.

=== Core subjects ===
The degree or qualification must be in common law, and should include passes in eleven core subjects, including the following (or equivalent):

- Contract
- Tort
- Constitutional Law
- Criminal Law
- Property Law
- Law of Trusts (or Equity or Remedies).
- Evidence
- Business Associations (or Company law)
- Commercial Law

Six of these must be completed as part of a student's main law qualification: Contract, Tort, Constitutional Law, Criminal Law, Property Law and Equity.

Conversion examinations are offered twice a year for the remaining five subjects.

Students may complete these core subjects:

- as part of their non-Hong Kong common law qualification;
- as a visiting "internal" student in one of the three universities awarding LLB and/or JD degrees in Hong Kong and passing the requisite examination; and
- by passing the relevant subject in the Hong Kong Conversion Examination for PCLL Admission.

=== New top-up subjects from September 2008 ===
From September 2008 onwards, all candidates with overseas qualifications (i.e. not graduating with a law degree from local universities) must demonstrate competence in the following areas to be eligible for the PCLL:

- Hong Kong Constitutional Law
- Hong Kong Land Law
- Hong Kong Legal System

Students may do so:

- as a visiting "internal" student in one of the three universities awarding LLB or JD degrees in Hong Kong and passing the requisite examination;
- as part of the Graduate Diploma in English and Hong Kong Law taught and awarded in Hong Kong; or
- by passing the relevant subject in the Hong Kong Conversion Examination for PCLL Admission.

The effect of these requirements is that PCLL entrants who wish to avoid the need to sit additional conversion examinations in these three subjects must either enroll on the Graduate Diploma in English and Hong Kong Law, which is jointly offered by the University of Hong Kong's School of Professional and Continuing Education (HKU SPACE) as the course operator and Manchester Metropolitan University as the qualification awarding institution, or enroll with the law faculty of one of the three universities awarding LLB or JD degrees in Hong Kong.

=== International English Language Testing System (IELTS) ===
In addition to the above admission requirements, all students applying for PCLL must take the IELTS English proficiency test (Academic Module), the results of which is not earlier than three years preceding the closing date for applications. A minimum score of 7 is required, as set by the Standing Committee on Legal Education and Training.

== Course content ==
=== The Chinese University of Hong Kong ===
The programme is taught in two stages. In the first term, five compulsory subjects involve the study of core practice areas necessary for progression into the second term: Professional Practice, Commercial Practice, Property and Probate Practice, Civil Litigation Practice, and Criminal Litigation Practice.

In the second term, students are free to choose five electives which build upon the core skills and knowledge from the first term. Though there is no streaming in the PCLL programme between intending Barristers and Solicitors, students who intend to seek admission as a Barrister in Hong Kong must undertake the following three courses: Trial Advocacy (taught intensively in the summer term), Writing & Drafting Litigation Documents, and Conference Skills and Opinion Writing.

=== The University of Hong Kong ===
There are five compulsory subjects: Civil Litigation, Criminal Litigation, Property Transactions, Corporate & Commercial Transactions, Professional Practice & Management.

==== Streaming ====
In 2007–08, students had to choose one of two streams: CPC (commercial, probate and corporate practice; for intending solicitors) or Litigation (for intending barristers and litigation solicitors). Course content is identical in the first semester. In the second semester, while the subjects taken remain identical for both streams, CPC students focus more on the commercial aspect (letter writing, agreement drafting, etc.), while Litigation students focus more on the advocacy, pleadings drafting and opinion writing aspects.

As all barristers must have taken the Litigation stream, many students wishing to leave their options open may opt for Litigation even if they plan to be a solicitor in the short term, to avoid having to retake the PCLL.

=== City University of Hong Kong ===
There are eleven core courses: Interlocutory Advocacy and Interviewing; Trial Advocacy; Mediation and Negotiation; Litigation Writing and Drafting; Commercial Writing and Drafting; Conveyancing Practice; Wills and Probate Practice; Corporate and Commercial Practice; Civil Litigation Practice; Criminal Litigation Practice; and Professional Conduct and Practice.

In the second term, students must also take three electives which include the Bar Course; Foundations in Mainland Related Legal Transactions; International Arbitration Practice; Family Law Practice; Personal Injuries Practice; Financial Regulatory Practice, Chinese for Legal Practice, Commercial Writing and Drafting; and Corporate Fundraising for Lawyers. Students must take the Bar Course as elective if they intend to become barristers. Many students wishing to leave their options open may opt for the Bar Course even if they plan to be a solicitor in the short term, to avoid having to retake the PCLL.

== Course fees ==
Course fees in HK$
	HKU	CityU	CUHK
Full-time (government-funded)	$42,100^{(1)}	$42,100^{(2)}	$42,100
Full-time (self-funded)	$194,000	$205,200	$193,800
Part-time	$225,000^{(3)}		

^{(1)}$171,000 for non-local students
^{(2)}$140,000 for non-local students
^{(3)}Payable in two annual instalments of $112,500 each

== Admission details ==
=== CUHK ===
The CUHK Faculty of Law commenced its PCLL in September 2008, with student intake of around 150 each year. Admission to the programme is highly competitive. Successful applicants have, on the whole, achieved at least a 2:1 honours (or its equivalent) in their law degree.

The course is only offered as a one-year full-time course, with one point of entry in September. In 2019-20, 36 places were government-funded.

=== HKU ===
HKU's intake is currently approximately 280 (full-time) and 80 (part-time), with approximately 70–80 of those from its own LLB programme. Others come from universities in other common law jurisdictions, particularly the United Kingdom and Australia.

The minimum academic level required has increased with each intake. Previously, all HKU LLB graduates would have been admitted into its PCLL programme; now, just over two-thirds are admitted (i.e. at least a decent 2:1 honours in the LLB). Non-HKU LLB students usually require a 2:1 honours.

In 2019-20, 117 places were government-funded and 172 were self-funded.

=== CityU ===
The CityU PCLL intake is currently around 210 students per year, with approximately 100 of those from its own LL.B. and J.D. programmes. Others come from universities in other common law jurisdictions, particularly the United Kingdom, Canada, and Australia. Non-CityU students usually require at least a 2:1 honours. In 2019-20, 53 places were government-funded.

== See also ==
- Legal Practice Course (LPC)
- Bar Professional Training Course (BPTC)
- Common Professional Examination (CPE), or Graduate Diploma in Law (GDL)
- Graduate Diploma in English and Hong Kong Law (GDEHKL)
- Certificate in Legal Practice (Malaysia) (CLP)
