= KoGuan Law School =

Chinese law school

- Type: Public
- Established: 1901
- Dean: Kong Xiangjun
- Location: Shanghai
- Campus: Urban

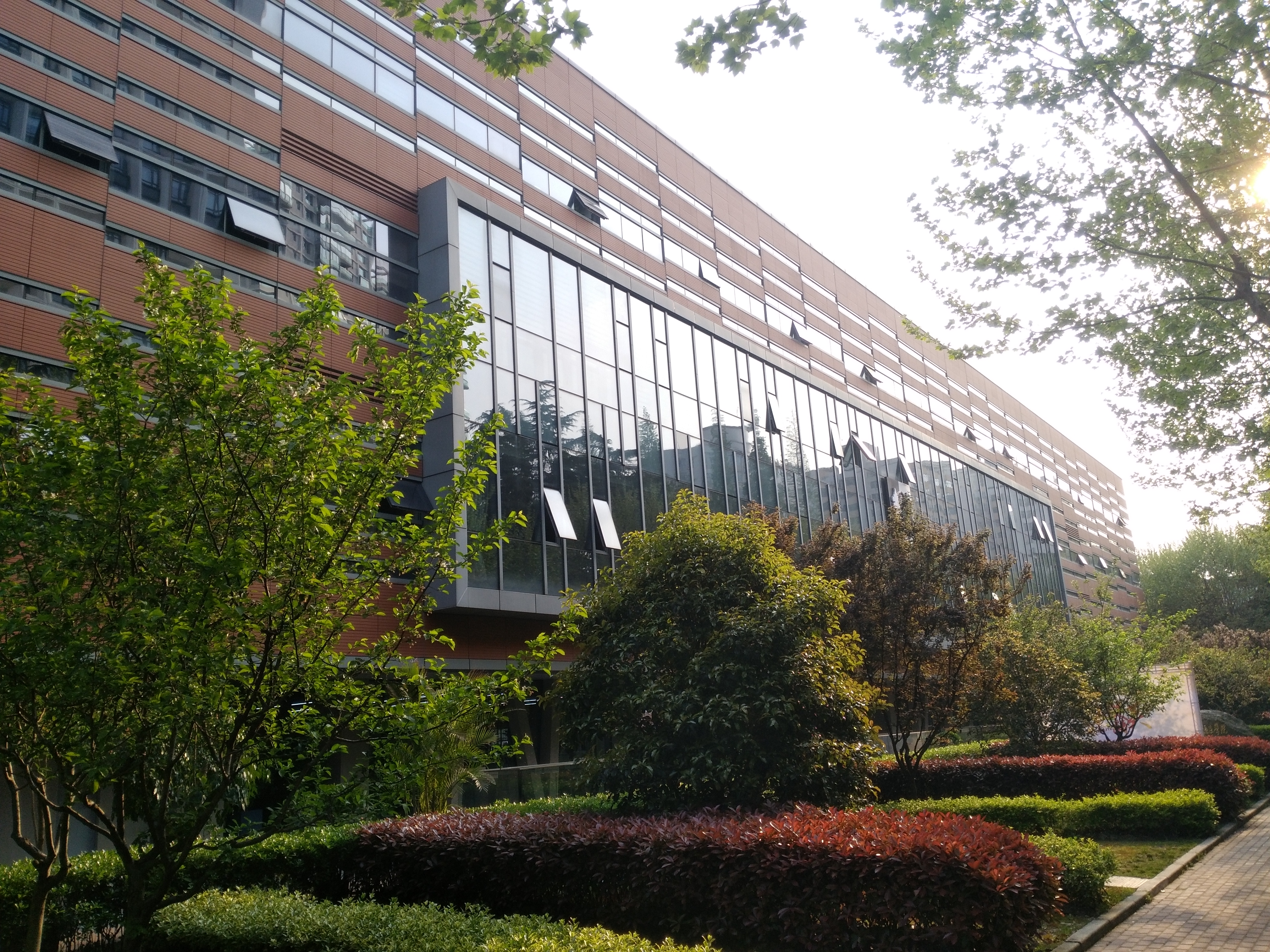
KoGuan Law School

KoGuan Law School of Shanghai Jiao Tong University is one of China's leading law schools. Among China's largest and oldest law schools, KoGuan Law is located on the Xuhui campus, in the center of China's business and financial capital, Shanghai. The school was renamed after Chinese American businessman Leo Koguan in 2008.

== Research ==
KoGuan Law School's research centers carry out research in a broad range of fields and disciplines. From law and society, constitutional law, intellectual property law, and maritime law, KoGuan's research centers host seminars, hubs, and conferences that promote collaboration and research in a range of important academic fields.

' Center for Competition Law and Policy

An interdisciplinary research center at the Law School. Founded in 2010 to promote knowledge, collaboration, and enforcement of AML.

Center for Human Rights and Humanitarian Law

Founded in 2002 and made up of research staff in a range of disciplines. To add to the existing research regarding contemporary human rights and supplement the promotion of global and national collaboration in the discipline of human rights.

Center for Intellectual Property Law

Founded in 2004 and carrying out inter-disciplinary studies on questions related to the area of high-tech intellectual property rights protection.

Institute of Economic Law

Founded in 2006. The principal areas of study are the general theory of economic law, anti-monopoly law, tax law and financial law. The center coordinates several research initiatives in partnership with national and regional governments.

Institute of International Law

Founded in 2003. Members specialize in private international law, international financial law, WTO law, public international law, international human rights, international commercial arbitration, international investment law, and alternative dispute resolution.

Institute of Constitutional and Administrative Law

Founded in 2002, the center is a teaching and research hub for the study of constitutional and administrative law. The members of the center are currently involved in studying areas such as the judicial protection of citizens’ basic rights, the foundation of the rule of law, administrative governance, and regional and urban law.

Center for Oceans Law and Policy

Created against the backdrop of China's development in maritime affairs and the establishment of Shanghai's International Shipping Center, the center draws on research from the financial law and insurance law sectors. As well as carrying out academic research and educating professionals in the discipline, the institute is focused on studying a range of legal and policy questions confronting government agencies, NGOs, and related actors in the areas of the law of oceans law, maritime law, and marine environmental protection.

Law and Society Center

An interdisciplinary research center was established against the backdrop of globalization to analyze the relationship between law and society, in particular, several legal issues confronting China in the era of social transformation. The research goals of the institute focus on two challenging areas facing China in the ongoing process of social transformation, namely governance and judicial reform.

== Publications ==
The school publishes, in partnership with the University of Cambridge, the Asian Journal of Law and Society. The Asian Journal of Law and Society (AJLS) provides an increasingly relevant Asian perspective to global law and society research. This independent, peer-reviewed publication promotes empirical and inter-disciplinary research and welcomes papers on law and its interaction with society in Asia, articles providing an Asian perspective to socio-legal issues of global concern, and articles using Asia as a starting point for a comparative exploration of law and society topics. Its coverage of Asia is broad and stretches from East Asia, South Asia and South East Asia to Central Asia.
