= CUHK Faculty of Law =

Public law school in Hong Kong

The Chinese University of Hong Kong Faculty of Law 香港中文大學法律學院
- Established: 2004
- School type: Public
- Dean: Chao XI
- Location: Shatin, New Territories, Hong Kong
- Enrollment: 1,529; 332 LLB; 509 JD; 119 BBA-JD; 378 LLM; 147 PCLL; 44 MPhil/PhD
- Faculty: 50
- Website: www.law.cuhk.edu.hk

The Chinese University of Hong Kong Faculty of Law (Chinese: 香港中文大學法律學院; abbreviated as CUHK LAW) is the law school of The Chinese University of Hong Kong. It was founded in 2004 and is one of the three law schools in Hong Kong, alongside the Faculty of Law of The University of Hong Kong and the School of Law of the City University of Hong Kong. The current dean is Chao Xi.

== History ==
In 2004, The Chinese University of Hong Kong submitted its Academic Development Proposal for the 2005–08 triennium to the University Grants Committee (UGC), where it set out its desire to establish a new law school as part of a key element of the university's ten-year vision. The proposal was accepted, whereupon the School of Law was established as the third and newest law school in the territory. Mike McConville, Simon FS Li Professor of Law, was appointed as the first director of the school.

The School of Law, with its founding group of LLB, JD and LLM students, was formally inaugurated on 9 November 2006. The first research students, comprising MPhil and PhD candidates, were admitted in 2007. The Postgraduate Certificate in Laws (PCLL) programme, the professional qualification programme required for admission to the legal profession in Hong Kong, began in September 2008. On 1 August 2008, the School of Law was renamed the Faculty of Law in recognition of its expanded size and development. In 2010, the Faculty established a careers advice programme in conjunction with its Virtual Careers Resource Centre, first of its kind among Hong Kong law schools, to prepare law students for entering the profession or to explore alternative career paths. In 2014, the Faculty established the Career Planning and Professionalism Office and Paul Mitchard QC was appointed the Director of the Office. In 2015, a redesigned logo was adopted for the Faculty, along with the gradual phasing out of the Faculty's previous logo used since its establishment.

In August 2011, McConville stepped down from the Deanship and has remained an emeritus professor at the Faculty. He was succeeded by Christopher Gane, former Vice-Principal and Chair of Scots Law at the University of Aberdeen School of Law, Scotland, as Dean and Simon FS Li Professor of Law in September 2011. Upon his retirement in September 2019, Lutz-Christian Wolff, Wei Lun Professor of Law and former Dean of the CUHK Graduate School (2004-2019) assumed the Deanship. Wolff was a founding member of the Faculty of Law (then: School of Law). He specializes in international and Chinese business law, private international law as well as comparative law. In addition to Wei Lun Professor of Law awarded to Wolff in 2014, the Faculty currently has two other named professorships: Choh-Ming Li Professor of Law awarded to Chin Leng Lim in 2017 and Simon FS Li Professor of Law awarded to Bryan Mercurio in 2019.

Wolff completed his Deanship in September 2024. Chao Xi was appointed as Dean of the Faculty of Law with effect from 1 November 2024.

== List of deans ==
No.	Portrait	Name	Term of office			Background or previous appointment						
No.	Portrait	Name	Took office	Left office	Duration	Background or previous appointment						
1		Mike McConville	August 2008	August 2011	3 years							
1		Mike McConville	August 2008	August 2011	3 years		2	Christopher Gane	September 2011	September 2019	8 years	Former vice principal and chair of Scots Law, the University of Aberdeen School of Law
3		Lutz-Christian Wolff	October 2019	September 2024	5 years							
4		Chao Xi	1 November 2024	Incumbent								

== Ranking ==
The Research Assessment Exercise (RAE) Report of 2014, prepared by the University Grants Committee of the Hong Kong Government, ranked CUHK LAW at first place under the Law panel. In the RAE 2020, CUHK LAW is again overall leading in the law domain with 83% of its research activity being rated as 4* ("world leading") and 3* ("internationally excellent").

The annual QS global university rankings, released on 29 April 2015, showed that in the subject category of "law and legal studies", The Chinese University of Hong Kong was ranked 42nd world-wide. These rankings are based upon academic reputation, employer reputation, and research impact.

In 2018 CUHK LAW was ranked by the Times Higher Education (THE) ranking exercise the most international law school worldwide.

== Campuses ==
CUHK LAW operates on twin sites, with its headquarters at the university main campus in Shatin. The LL.B students conduct their undergraduate classes in Shatin at the Lee Shau Kee Building, which includes its own moot court. Situated immediately next to it is the Lee Quo Wei Law Library, located on the 3rd and 4th floors of the University Library.

The graduate-level law classes for the JD, the LLM and the PCLL are held at the CUHK Graduate Law Centre (GLC), on the second floor of the Bank of America Tower in Admiralty. Located in the central business district of Hong Kong, the GLC is within walking distance of the Hong Kong High Court, the Court of Final Appeal Building, barristers' chambers and law firms. The GLC has its own legal resources center, considered a "mini law library", as well as lecture theatres, a multi-purpose moot court, break-out rooms and a computer lab to facilitate teaching and learning.

The Sir TL Yang Society, named after Ti Liang Yang, a former Chief Justice of Hong Kong, is organised by CUHK LAW. It arranges activities and social functions to assist law students in their academic and professional development. The primary student governments at CUHK LAW is the Undergraduate Law Society and the Graduate Law Students Association (GLSA).

In 2011, the GLSA founded the GLSA Gazette, a law student publication which "aims to encourage students to engage in key legal issues, contribute to legal scholarship, and to build closer ties between law students and the wider legal community." It was thereafter rebranded as the Hong Kong Student Law Gazette in 2012 and has remained a student-run organization encompassing undergraduate and postgraduate students. The Gazette has since received tremendous support from the faculty and Hong Kong's legal community, including industry leaders, the judiciary and the city's top law firms.

== Degrees granted ==
CUHK LAW offers both undergraduate and postgraduate level law degree programmes. Unlike most other common law jurisdictions, the LLB and the JD exists simultaneously in Hong Kong, allowing for potential admission to the legal profession through an undergraduate or a postgraduate route.

=== Undergraduate ===
It offers a full-time four-year Bachelor of Laws (LL.B.) Programme. The degree offers students a general and professional education at the undergraduate level. Successful applicants who enroll in the LLB programme at The Chinese University of Hong Kong are given the opportunity to choose a double degree option towards the end of their first year. Two double degree options are available for LLB students: Law and Translation; and Law and Sociology. In collaboration with the Dickson Poon School of Law of King's College London (KCL), CUHK LAW offers a study option for LLB students to join the KCL's Master of Laws (LLM) Programme. The two law schools also jointly offer a Dual LLB-JD Degree Programme which provides students with an opportunity to study towards an LLB degree awarded by KCL and a JD degree awarded by CUHK in four years.

Other dual/double degree programmes offered by CUHK LAW include the BBA-JD Double Degree Programme with the CUHK Business School, and the Dual LLB-JD Degree Programme with the University of Exeter Law School.

=== Postgraduate ===
- Juris Doctor (J.D.)
- JD-MBA Double Degree
- Master of Laws (LL.M.) in Chinese Business Law, Common Law, Energy and Environmental Law, International Economic Law, and Legal History
- Master of Philosophy in Laws (MPhil)
- Doctor of Philosophy in Laws (PhD)
- Postgraduate Certificate in Laws (P.C.LL.), required for admission to the profession

== Notable people ==
The chairman of the advisory board for CUHK LAW is the Honourable Justice Kemal Bokhary, a founding Permanent Judge of the Hong Kong Court of Final Appeal who continues to serve as a Non-Permanent Judge on that Court after his retirement in 2012. The inaugural Dean, Mike McConville, is a well-respected socio-legal scholar. Other internationally notable former and present faculty members include Michael Pendleton (intellectual property), Nina Jørgensen (international law), Ling Bing (Chinese contract law), Yu Xingzhong (constitutional law), Chin Leng Lim (international dispute settlement), Bryan Mercurio (international economic law), Robin Hui Huang (corporate and financial law), Anatole Boute (energy law), Gregory Gordon (international criminal law), Xi Chao (Chinese corporate law) and Bryan Druzin (legal theory).

=== Honorary Professors ===
- The Right Honourable the Lord Woolf, former Lord Chief Justice of England and Wales and a Non-permanent Judge of the Court of Final Appeal of Hong Kong
- Dr The Honourable Andrew Li CBE GBM JP, former Chief Justice of the Court of Final Appeal of Hong Kong
- Dr The Honourable Geoffrey Ma Tao-li GBM KC SC, former Chief Justice of the Court of Final Appeal of Hong Kong
- The Right Honourable Lady Elish Angiolini DBE KC, former Lord Advocate of Scotland, Pro Vice Chancellor of the University of Oxford and Principal of St Hugh's College, Oxford
- The Honourable Mr. Justice Syed Kemal Shah Bokhary GBM, Non-Permanent Judge of the Hong Kong Court of Final Appeal

=== Honorary Visiting Professors ===
- Mr Ian Grenville Cross GBS, SBS, KC, SC, former Director of Public Prosecutions of Hong Kong
- Prof Kaj Hobér
- Prof Paul Maharg
- Prof Spyros Maniatis
- Prof John Paterson
- Mr Benjamin Yu SBS SC JP

== Research centres and programmes ==
=== Centre for Legal Innovation and Digital Society (CLINDS) ===
The Centre facilitates and encourages cutting-edge and innovative research in law and technology at CUHK LAW. CLINDS was previous known as the Centre for Financial Regulation and Economic Development (CFRED) founded by Professor David Donald in 2010 to support and facilitate research in all areas of law affecting commerce and business. In 2017, CFRED changed the direction of its activities towards research projects related to law and technology. In 2022, CFRED was re-organized and renamed as CLINDS to better reflect the centre's new focus thus mirroring CUHK LAW's strength in law and technology.

=== Centre for Comparative and Transnational Law (CCTL) ===
Established in January 2020, the Centre aims to support faculty's research in comparative law and transnational law, with a particular focus in the fields of comparative rights and justice; comparative constitutional law; private international law; and legal history and development. The centre's innovative collaborative research is supported through the following 8 cluster groups: Comparative Public Law Research Forum, Corporate Law and Governance Cluster, Environmental, Energy and Climate Law Cluster, Obligations Lab Asia, Private International Law Group, Tax Law and Policy Forum, Transnational Economic Law and Dispute Settlement Group, and Transnational Legal History Group.

== Other programmes ==
=== International moot court competitions ===
Since its inception, the law school has hosted and participated in numerous international mooting competitions. For instance, in March 2007, the School of Law hosted the 4th Annual Willem C. Vis (East) International Commercial Arbitration Moot at the Graduate Law Centre in Admiralty. The international competition brought over 40 law schools from around the world to Hong Kong.

The CUHK Vis team, composed of first year JD law students, earned a team honourable mention and an individual honourable mention in their first moot competition at the 4th Annual Vis (East) moot. In the Vis (Vienna) Moot 2008, CUHK finished 17th out of 214 participating teams and a team mooter received an honourable mention for his advocacy skills. At the 10th Annual Vis (East) moot in 2013, lead oralists Jenny Chan and Felicity Ng took the team to the elimination round and finished at the Semi-Finals, marking the team's first appearance at the Vis (East) elimination rounds and further defeated the defending champion in the quarter-finals. In 2014, CUHK went into the elimination rounds in both Hong Kong and Vienna, in addition to receiving a total of 9 honorable mentions from Vis (East) and Vis (Vienna), 5 of which were from Vis (Vienna). This placed CUHK as the top university for having the most awards and honorable mentions. In 2016, CUHK emerged as the Championship team at the 13th Annual Willem C. Vis (East) International Commercial Arbitration moot. In 2020, CUHK won again the championship at the 17th Willem C. Vis (East) International Commercial Arbitration Moot which was held virtually for the first time amidst the COVID-19 pandemic.

The CUHK Jessup team have made significant achievements at the Philip C. Jessup International Law Moot Court Competition since 2008. Especially noteworthy is the 2010 team's winning the Hardy C. Dillard Award, which honours the best overall memorials worldwide submitted by both the applicant and the respondent (out of almost 600 teams). During the regional round in 2008–2009 and 2009–2010, the CUHK Jessup team won the prizes for Best Team, Best Oralist and Best Memorial and represented Hong Kong at Washington, DC. At the International Rounds in 2010, the CUHK team ranked 19th overall from the 105 competing teams who made it to that stage of the competition. In 2016's regional round, the team won the White & Case Jessup Cup (Championship) and the prizes for Best Applicant Memorial, Best Respondent Memorial, Best Oralist, and Second Runner-Up Oralist. It was again the winner of the regional round in 2020 and received the prize for Best Oralist.

The CUHK ICC team has demonstrated its continued success at the International Criminal Court Moot Court Competition. Having reached the Grand Final of the competition's first Chinese version in 2014, CUHK swiftly emerged as Champions in 2016 at the national rounds in Beijing and the final rounds in The Hague. In the national round the team also claimed the prize for Best Prosecution Oralist. In the ICC Moot 2019, CUHK finished 2nd against over 70 teams from around the world and earned four major awards including Best Prosecution Team (based on both written and oral advocacy), Best Prosecution Counsel, Best Oralist of the preliminary rounds and 2nd Best Defense Memorial. In 2020, the CUHK ICC team outperformed 70 teams worldwide, won the Championship, and was awarded the prizes for Best Memorial Team Overall, Best Regional Memorial for Asia, Best Defense Counsel Memorial, Second Runner-up Best Memorial, and Second Runner-up Best Prosecution Memorial.

==== Mooting Competitions CUHK LAW participates in ====
- Herbert Smith Freehills Kramer Competition Law Moot
- Hong Kong Human Rights Moot Court Competition (since 2010)
- International Air Law Moot Court Competition
- LAWASIA International Moot Competition
- Red Cross International Humanitarian Law Moot

== See also ==
- The Chinese University of Hong Kong
- University of Hong Kong
- City University of Hong Kong
- Postgraduate Certificate in Laws
