= City University of Hong Kong Law Review =

- Discipline: Law
- Language: English

Publication details
- History: 2009-present
- Publisher: City University of Hong Kong School of Law
- Frequency: Biannually

Standard abbreviations
- Bluebook: City U. H.K. L. Rev.
- ISO 4: City Univ. Hong Kong Law Rev.

Indexing
- ISSN: 2076-4030
- OCLC no.: 503167278

Links
- Journal homepage; Online archive

The City University of Hong Kong Law Review (often CityUHK LR) is a student-edited and peer-reviewed law journal published by the School of Law of the City University of Hong Kong. It was established in October 2009. The journal features articles, notes, book reviews, and recent legal developments in Hong Kong as well as mainland China. The journal is published annually and is available on HeinOnline and Westlaw.

== Aims and objectives ==
The journal aims to:

- publish papers on cutting-edge issues in diverse areas of law
- provide a forum for members of legal fraternity in Hong Kong and overseas to engage in dialogue on contemporary global and local legal issues
- keep readers up to date on recent legal developments taken place in mainland China, Hong Kong, and Macau
- encourage law students to publish in a scholarly journal with international audience
- harness the writing, editing and research skills of law students

== Editorial board ==
The journal is edited by a selected group of LLB and JD students from the City University of Hong Kong School of Law. 20 students are selected yearly. They are handpicked based on their academic performance, language skills, past editing experience and writing abilities. The student members of the Board are supported by the faculty editor and an international board of advisors.

== Submission criteria ==
The journal accepts submissions on a rolling basis throughout the year. A stringent selection process is adopted to single out suitable papers for publication. All papers are reviewed anonymously by the Board members via a double-blind peer review process. Attributes such as its topicality, originality, persuasiveness, structure, level of research and language will be considered. Any submitted papers must address current legal issues which are of interest in the Asia-Pacific region. It should also introduce unique perspectives and insights on the subject concerned in a cohesive and persuasive manner. Authors are also expected to demonstrate reasonable standard of research by accurately stating the laws and legal concepts with adequate references.

== Notable articles ==
- Roger Hood, 'Abolition of the Death Penalty: China in World Perspective' (2009) 1 CityU LR 1
- David Weissbrodt, 'The Administration of Justice and Human Rights' (2009) 1 CityU LR 23
- Adrian Zuckerman, 'The Challenge of Civil Justice Reform: Effective Court Management of Litigation' (2009) 1 CityU LR 49
- Christopher Michaelsen, 'The Proportionality Principle, Counter-terrorism Laws and Human Rights: A German-Australian Comparison' (2010) 2 CityU LR 19
- Nicola McGarrity & George Williams, 'Counter-Terrorism Laws in a Nation without a Bill of Rights: The Australian Experience' (2010) 2 CityU LR 45
- Michael Hor, 'Singapore Criminal Law: Examining the Etiology of Exception' (2010) 2 CityU LR 81
- Christina Binder, 'Economic Growth at the Price of Human Rights Violations? The Protection of Human/Labour Rights in Export Processing Zones' (2010) 2 CityU LR 99
- Richard Meeran, 'Tort Litigation against Multinational Corporations for Violation of Human Rights: An Overview of the Position Outside the United States' (2011) 3 CityU LR 1
- Mark Kielsgard, 'Sentencing Insights in the International Crimes Court of Cambodia' (2011) 3 CityU LR 43
- Janice Chin Poh Wah, 'Improving Corporate Governance in China through Differentiated Listing Segments: Lessons from the Brazilian Novo Mercado' (2011) 3 CityU LR 141
- Tom Papain, 'The Convention on the Rights of the Child: How North Korea Is Violating a Child's Right to a Quality Education' (2011) 3 CityU LR 65
