= HKU Space =

Educational institution in Hong Kong

University of Hong Kong School of Professional and Continuing Education
- 香港大學專業進修學院
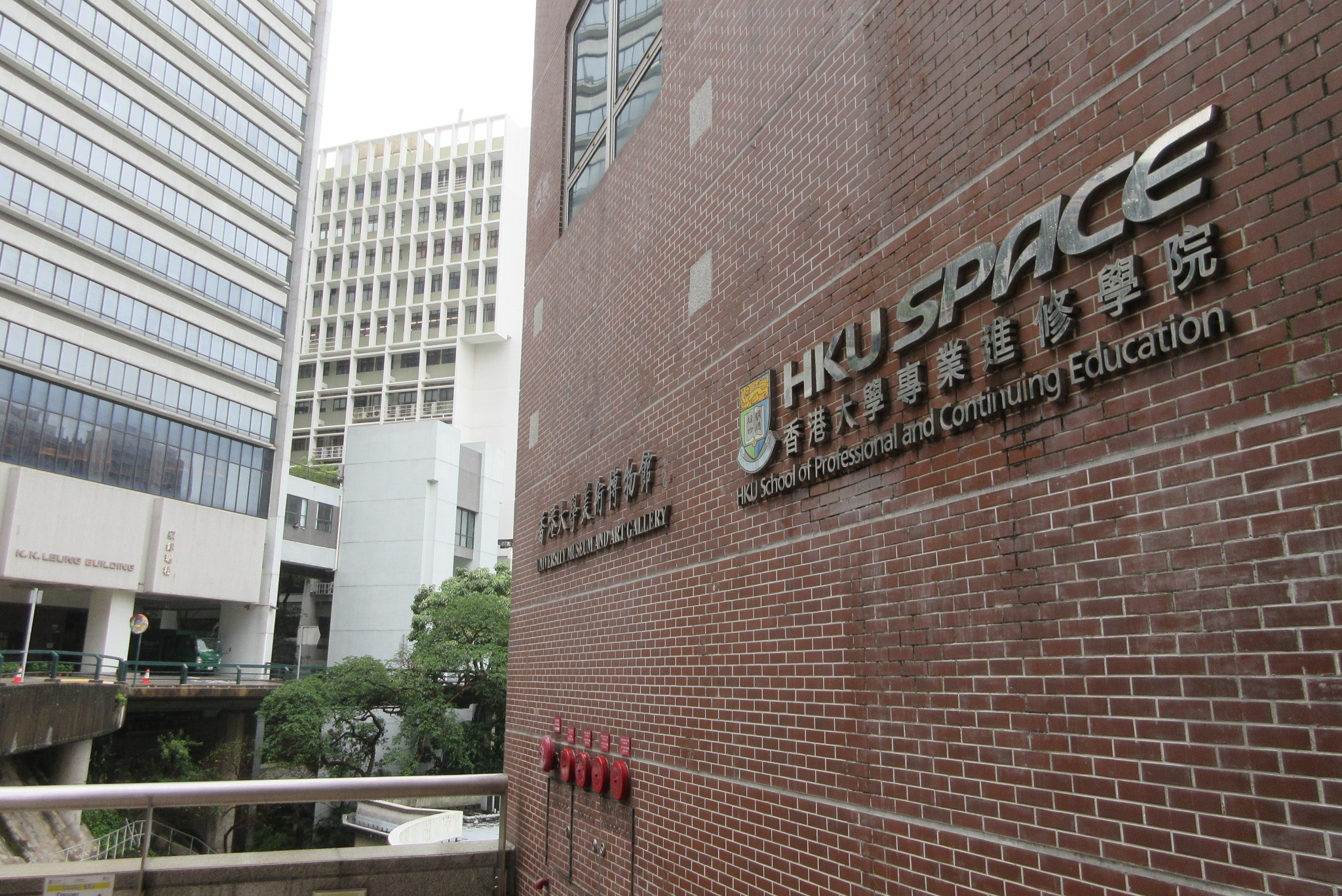
- HKU SPACE logo on the side of a building at the HKU main campus.
- Former names: Department of Extra-Mural Studies
- Type: Private nonprofit higher education institution limited by guarantee
- Established: 21 May 1957; 69 years ago
- Parent institution: University of Hong Kong
- Chairman: Professor Edward K Y Chen
- Director: Professor William K M LEE (李經文教授)
- Academic staff: 195 (full-time); 1,900 (part-time)
- Administrative staff: 4 (Senior Management); 315 (Programme Management); 347 (Administrative & Support)
- Students: 93,208 (2021/22); 23,480 (Full-time Equivalent)
- Location: Room 304, 3/F, T T Tsui Building, University of Hong Kong, Pok Fu Lam, Hong Kong
- Website: hkuspace.hku.hk

Chinese name
- Simplified Chinese: 香港大学专业进修学院
- Traditional Chinese: 香港大學專業進修學院
Transcriptions
Standard Mandarin
- Hanyu Pinyin: Xiānggǎng Dàxué Zhuānyè Jìnxiū Xuéyuàn
Yue: Cantonese
- Yale Romanization: Hēung góng daaih hohk jyūn yihp jeun sāu hohk yún
- Jyutping: Hoeng1 gong2 daai6 hok6 zyun1 jip6 zoen3 sau1 hok6 jun2

The University of Hong Kong School of Professional and Continuing Education (HKU SPACE) is a private post-secondary education institution in Hong Kong. The school is a private subsidiary of the publicly-funded University of Hong Kong. The school specialises in professional education, as well as providing degree-awarding courses in partnership with overseas universities.

== History ==
In the early 1950s, it became apparent that there was a need for further education opportunities in Hong Kong. The findings of the Keswick Report (1952) and the Jennings-Logan Report (1953) provided recommendations to the British Hong Kong government to establish a new department aimed at providing adult-education programmes. On 21 May 1957, the University of Hong Kong (HKU) established the Department of Extra-Mural Studies with an enrollment of 330 students. The department's purpose was partly to develop and run courses to meet the needs of the growing city. These courses included library studies in response to the opening of the first library in the territory, and housing management to cope with the growing housing crises which plagued the city in the 1960s.

In January 1992, the department was renamed the School of Professional and Continuing Education. This change elevated its status with relation to its parent organisation, giving it financial autonomy and allowing it more freedom to make decisions for the programmes it offered. The school was reformed into a corporate structure in 1999, allowing HKU to differentiate the school's activities from public funding and to provide for more flexible and appropriate rules and procedures that are not available as a publicly-funded institution.

== Locations ==
As of 2023, HKU SPACE operates out of many small locations spread across Hong Kong:

Name	Photo	Address	Notes
Admiralty Learning Centre (金鐘教學中心)		2/F & 3/F, Admiralty Centre, 18 Harcourt Road, Admiralty	
CITA Learning Centre (製衣業訓練局教學中心)		63 Tai Yip Street, Kowloon Bay	
Kowloon West Campus (九龍西分校)		5/F & 12/F, NCB Innovation Centre, 888 Lai Chi Kok Road, Cheung Sha Wan, Kowloon	
Fortress Tower Learning Centre (北角城教學中心)		1/F, 4/F, 10/F, 14/F, 16/F, 19/F, 20/F & 22/F, Fortress Tower, 250 King's Road, North Point	
Graduate House Learning Centre (研究生堂教學中心)		Level P6 (Room P601 & P602), Graduate House, No. 3 University Drive, The University of Hong Kong	
HKU SPACE Po Leung Kuk Stanley Ho Community College (HPSHCC) Campus (港大保良何鴻燊社區書院)		66 Leighton Road, Causeway Bay	
Island East Campus (港島東分校)		494 King's Road, North Point	
Kowloon East Campus (九龍東分校)		28 Wang Hoi Road, Kowloon Bay	
United Learning Centre (統一教學中心)		6/F, United Centre, 95 Queensway	

== Subsidiaries ==
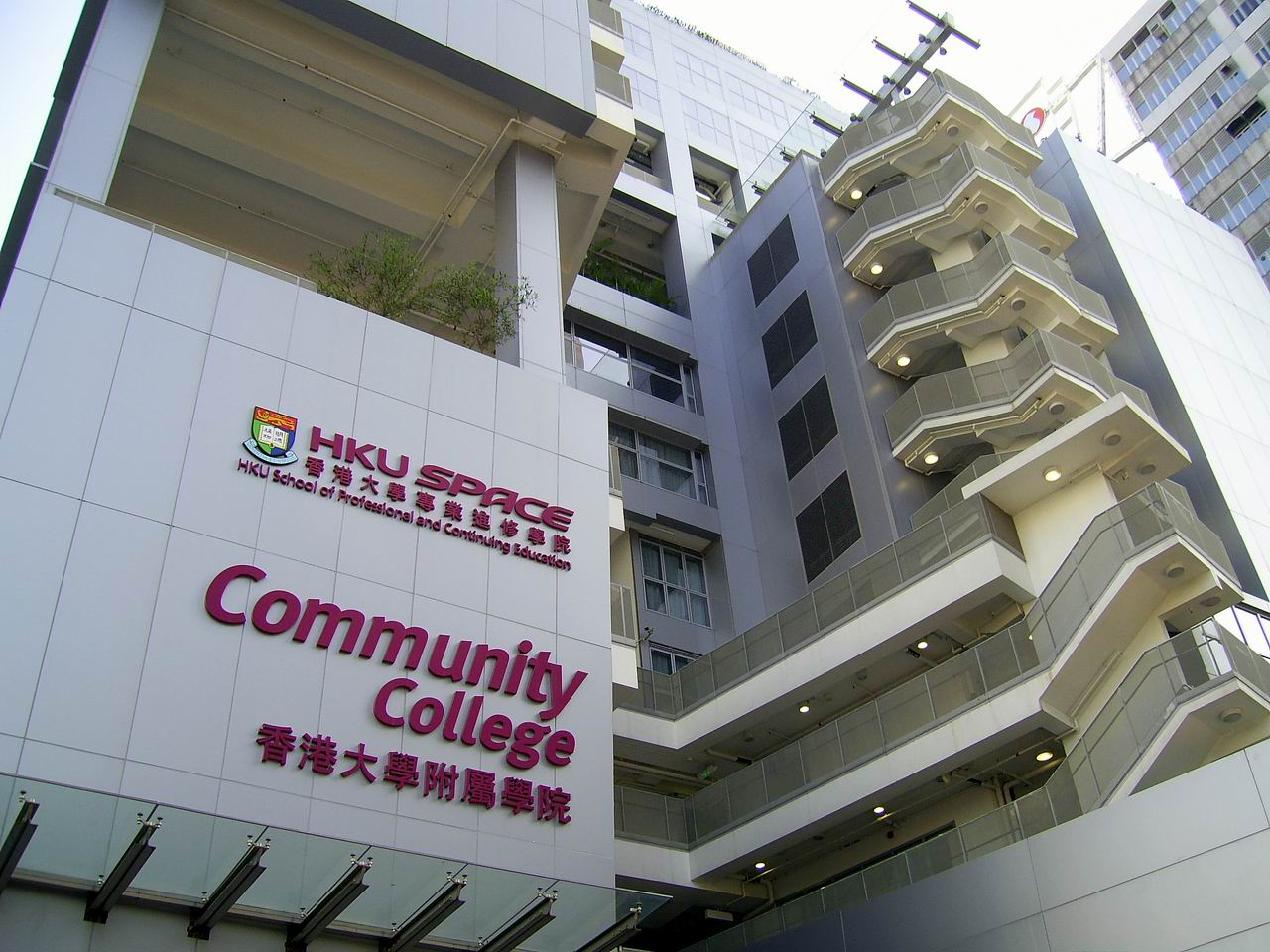
HKU SPACE Community College Campus in 2008

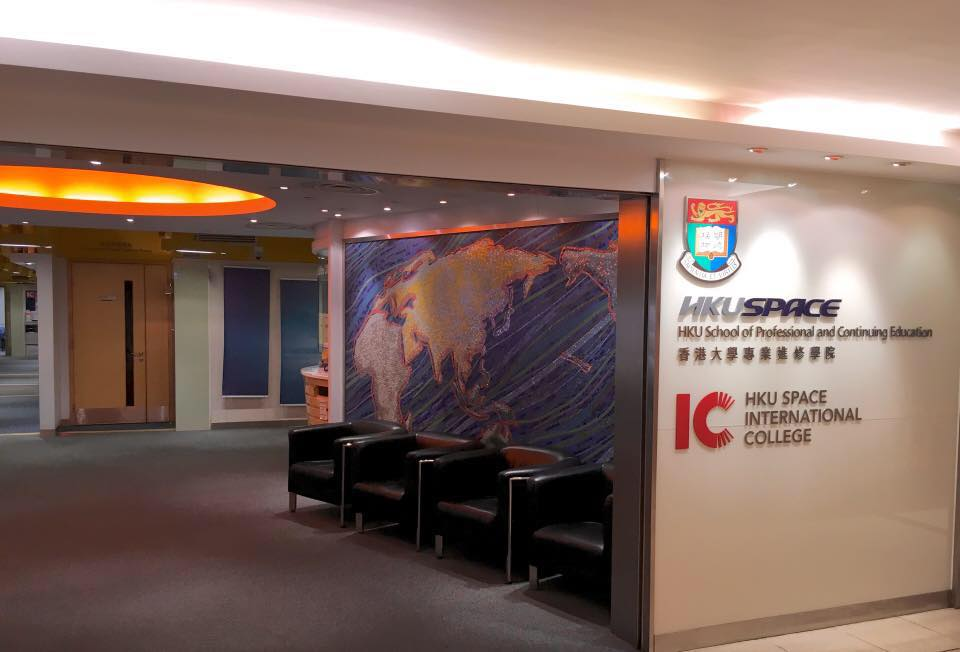
HKU SPACE International College Campus in 2016

HKU SPACE also oversees a number of subsidiary educational organisations:

- HKU SPACE Community College (established in 2000)
- HKU SPACE International College (established in 2003)
- HKU SPACE Po Leung Kuk Stanley Ho Community College (established in 2006)
- College of Business and Finance
- College of Humanities and Law
- College of Life Sciences and Technology
- Centre for Logistics and Transport

== International partners ==
HKU SPACE has strategic partnership with universities globally that offer a number of part time and full time courses at HKU SPACE campuses across Hong Kong.

== Alumni structure and organisations ==
Established in 2004, the HKU SPACE Alumni aims to maintain an active relation between the school and the alumni. The HKU Professional Real Estate Agencies Alumni and Hong Kong Students & Alumni Association of The Tsinghua University School of Law are limited companies under the companies ordinance. Nine more organisations were established as societies under the societies ordinance:

- HKU SPACE Public Relations and Corporate Communication Alumni Chapter
- HKU SPACE Society of Putonghua Students
- HKU SPACE Mediation Practice Alumni Society
- HKU SPACE Wine Alumni Association
- Gem & Jewellery Alumni Association
- HKU SPACE Art Collecting Alumni Association
- HKU SPACE Fintech Alumni Association
- HKU SPACE Financial Planning Alumni Society
- HKU SPACE Docent Alumni Society

The alumni membership systems also differs from other colleges including the HKU. It consist of the "Lifelong Learner Card" which is automatically obtained by graduating from HKU SPACE and the "Life Membership Card" which can only be obtained after paying the membership fee to be a "Life Member". The only differences between the life membership and ordinary membership is the privileges which provide discounts of companies in different field, which can only be access by the life member. However, most of the privileges were shared between the 2 different types of member.
