= Listed buildings in Christleton =

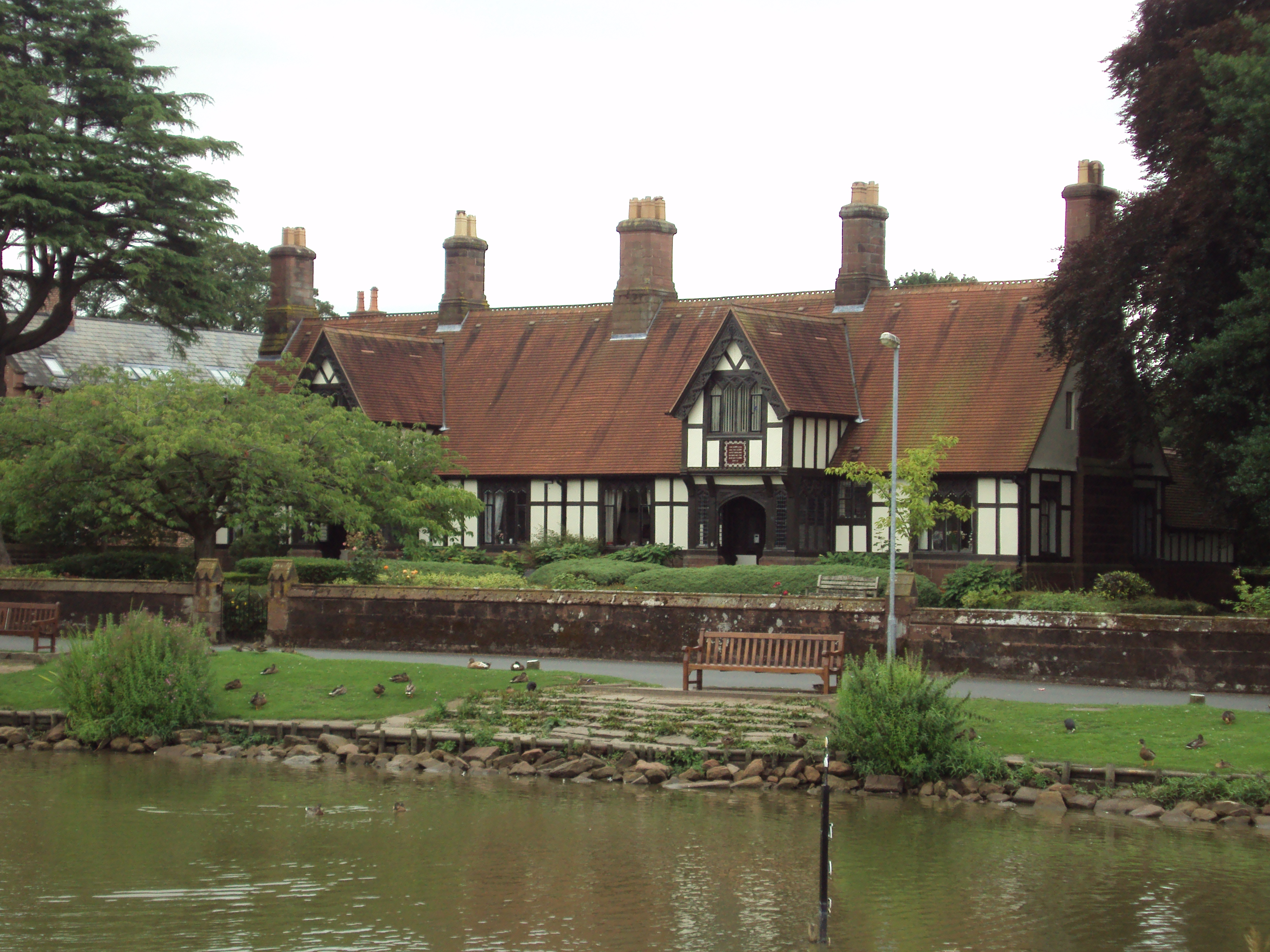
Dixon's Almshouses

Christleton is a civil parish in Cheshire West and Chester, England. It contains 32 buildings that are recorded in the National Heritage List for England as designated listed buildings. Of these, three are listed at Grade II*, and the others at Grade II. The largest settlement in the parish is the village of Christleton, and most of the listed buildings are in the village. These include houses with related structures, the church and items in the churchyard, almshouses, a memorial shelter, and a telephone kiosk. The Shropshire Union Canal passes through the parish, and three of its bridges are listed. Also listed is a former hydraulic sewage lift.

== Key ==
Grade	Criteria
Grade II*	Particularly important buildings of more than special interest.
Grade II	Buildings of national importance and special interest.

== Buildings ==
Name and location	Photograph	Date	Notes	Grade
St James' Church; 53.1856°N 2.8383°W		c. 1490	The church, other than the tower, was rebuilt in 1874–78 by William Butterfield. On the tower is a shingled pyramidal cap. The church is constructed in red and white sandstone with a slate roof. The body of the church consists of a nave and chancel in one range with a clerestory, north and south aisles, a south porch, and side chapels to the chancel.	II*
Manor House; 53.1856°N 2.8378°W	—	Late 16th century (probable)	The exterior dates from the early 18th century, and alterations were made in the 20th century. It is in brick, with a slate roof. The house has a rectangular plan, is in two storeys, and has four-bay front. The porch is in two storeys and is gabled, and the windows are casements.	II
Christleton Old Hall; 53.18552°N 2.83673°W	—	Early 17th century	Originally timber-framed, the house was encased in brick in about 1870. It is in two and three storeys, and has an entrance front of seven bays. Inside is "much good Jacobean plasterwork and panelling".	II*
Gazebo and wall 53.18541°N 2.84212°W	—	17th century	The gazebo is in the garden of Christleton Hall, altered in the 18th and 20th centuries. It is in brick with sandstone dressings, and has a slate roof. It has an inserted doorway, a window with a pointed arch, and an embattled parapet. Inside are pilasters, a vaulted ceiling, and a quarry tile floor.	II
The Old Farmhouse; 53.1842°N 2.8368°W	—	1653	The farmhouse was extended in the 18th century, and modernised in the 20th century. The older part is timber-framed with brick nogging on a sandstone plinth. It is in a single storey and has three bays. The newer part is in brick, is in two storeys and has two bays. The building has a slate roof, and contains casement windows.	II
Gates, gate piers and walls, Christleton Old Hall; 53.18549°N 2.83734°W	—	Early 18th century	The gate piers are in stone with a moulded plinth, a panelled body, a moulded cornice and a stepped stone top. The gates are in wrought iron and date from the 20th century. The flanking walls are in brick with a stone coping.	II
Bread ovens 53.18570°N 2.83642°W	—	Early 18th century	This is a set of six bread ovens, constructed in brick, and in two tiers in the north wall of the garden of Christleton Old Hall. These are rectangular openings with segmental heads, and all are now blocked.	II
The Surgery; 53.1846°N 2.8375°W	—	Early 18th century	This originated as a farmhouse, and was altered in the 19th century. It is in brick, standing on sandstone bedrock, and has a slate roof. The house is in two storeys, and has a symmetrical three-bay front. The windows are sashes. The central doorway is approached by four brick steps.	II
Ivy House; 53.1850°N 2.8394°W	—	Mid 18th century	A brick house with stone dressings, and a slate roof with a stone ridge. It is in three storeys and has a symmetrical three-bay front. The windows are sashes. The doorcase has an architrave and a triangular pediment.	II
Christleton Hall; 53.18578°N 2.84234°W	—	c. 1750	Built as a country house, it has since been used as a boarding school, and then as a law school. It was extended in the 20th century. The house is constructed in brick with stone dressings, and has a slate roof. It is in three storeys, and has a south front of four bays, three of which are from the original house. The 20th-century extensions are excluded from the listing.	II
Memorial to a dog 53.18561°N 2.83637°W	—	18th century (probable)	This consists of an upright grey sandstone slab with a buff sandstone surround in the grounds of Christleton Old Hall. It contains the carving of a spaniel, and an inscription in copperplate script, both of which are worn.	II
Sundial; 53.18546°N 2.83818°W	—	Mid to late 18th century	The sundial stands in the churchyard of St James' Church. It consists of a circular base on a shaped triangular plinth, carrying a plain column. On the top of this is a simple cap with a circular worn brass plate.	II
Stoneydale; 53.1854°N 2.8408°W	—	Mid to late 18th century	A brick house on a stone plinth with stone dressings and a slate roof. It has two storeys and is in two bays. The windows are sashes. The door has a semicircular head above which is a semicircular fanlight. The doorcase has fluted columns.	II
Christleton House; 53.1853°N 2.8393°W	—	1776	Despite the date on a rainhead, most of the fabric dates from the 19th century. It is a brick house on a stone plinth with stone dressings, and a hipped slate roof. It has a square plan with two storeys and a symmetrical three-bay front. The windows are sashes, and the doorcase has fluted columns and twisted capitals. In front of the door is a detached wooden porch on fluted piers, with a triglyph frieze, and a coffered ceiling.	II
Canal bridge No 120; 53.17998°N 2.83339°W		c. 1775	A bridge carrying Rowton Bridge Road across the Shropshire Union Canal. It is constructed in brick with stone dressings, and was designed by Samuel Weston for the Chester Canal Company. It consists of a segmental arch on canted piers. The plain parapet extends to form short curving wing walls ending in pilasters.	II
Quarry bridge (No 121); 53.18334°N 2.84201°W		c. 1776	A bridge carrying Quarry Road across the Shropshire Union Canal. It is constructed in brick with stone dressings, and was designed by Samuel Weston for the Chester Canal Company. It consists of a segmental arch on canted piers. The plain parapet extends to form short curving wing walls.	II
Canal bridge No 122; 53.18535°N 2.84437°W		c. 1776	A bridge carrying Pepper Street across the Shropshire Union Canal. It is constructed in brick with stone dressings, and was designed by Samuel Weston for the Chester Canal Company. The parapet extends to form curving wing walls ending in plain pilasters with pyramidal stone caps.	II
Rock House and shop 53.1849°N 2.8381°W		c. 1780	The butcher's shop was added in about 1890. The house is in brick on a stone plinth with sandstone dressings and a slate roof. It has 2 1/2 storeys, and a symmetrical three-bay front. The windows are sashes.. The shop has a single storeys and is in Ruabon brick. The house was the last home of William Huggins.	II
Haulfryn; 53.1842°N 2.8372°W	—	Early 19th century	A brick house with a slate roof. It has two storeys, and a symmetrical three-bay front. The windows are sashes, and the central doorway has a semicircular head.	II
Primrose, Holly, Clematis and Rose Cottages; 53.1847°N 2.8380°W	—	Early 19th century	A terrace of four brick cottages with slate roofs. They are in two storeys, and stretch for nine bays, three cottages having two bays and the other having three. The windows are sashes, other than Clematis Cottage, which has casements. The doorways are round-headed.	II
Garden wall, Christleton House; 53.18518°N 2.83926°W	—	c. 1830	Brick walls with stone dressings to the south and east of the hall. To the east of the hall, the wall rises above a stone gateway with a lintel.	II
Birch Bank Farmhouse; 53.1903°N 2.8175°W	—	1844	A brick farmhouse in Georgian style, with a pyramidal slate roof. It has a square plan, is in two storeys, and has a symmetrical main front, which is in three bays. The windows are sashes.	II
Boundary stone 53.18640°N 2.85002°W	—	Mid 19th century	A stone marking the boundary with the parish of Great Boughton. It is a semi-cylindrical block of sandstone inscribed with the word "Boughton".	II
Corner House and Sanden Cottage; 53.1847°N 2.8375°W	—	c. 1860	A pair of brick cottages with a slate roof. They are in two storeys, and have a symmetrical four-bay front. The windows are casements, those in the upper storey in gabled half-dormers.	II
Dixon's Almshouses; 53.1875°N 2.8350°W		1868	A row of six almshouses, designed by J. Oldrid Scott. They are timber-framed on a sandstone plinth, with tiled roofs, and are in Tudor Revival style. They are in one and two storeys, with a symmetrical six-bay front. Between the timber-framing, the plaster panels are decorated with pargeting. On the front are two gabled two-storey porches, and to the rear are three single-storey projecting entrances with verandahs.	II*
Boundary walls, Dixon's Almshouses; 53.18766°N 2.83524°W	—	1868	Stone walls surrounding the almshouses, with triangular coping along the top. In the front wall are three gateways with square gate piers.	II
Huggins headstone 53.18549°N 2.83806°W	—	1884	A sandstone slab to the memory of the animal artist William Huggins, which also bears the name of his brother, the architect Samuel Huggins, and their sister, Hannah. It is carved with a posy of roses, and an inscription.	II
Lych gate 53.18531°N 2.83806°W		c. 1885	The lychgate at the entrance to the churchyard of St James' Church was designed by William Butterfield. It has a sandstone base with gabled and coped sides topped by finials. Rising from the base are timber trusses carrying the roof, which is slated with a tiled ridge.	II
Memorial shelter 53.18521°N 2.83764°W		1886	Sited on the village green, the memorial shelter has an octagonal sandstone plinth and oak balusters supporting the pyramidal roof; the roof is shingled with a lead cap and an iron finial. The inner side of the lintel carries an inscription. The shelter was probably designed by John Douglas.	II
Hydraulic Sewage Lift; 53.18126°N 2.83948°W		c. 1900	The hydraulic sewage lift consists of a tall cast iron column a wooden hexagonal structure at the top, which has a pyramidal head and a pointed finial. The structure was used for pumping sewage, but is no longer in use.	II
War memorial 53.18528°N 2.83814°W		1920	The war memorial stands in the churchyard of St James' Church. It is in sandstone, about 6 metres (20 ft) high, and consists of a gabled decorated lantern with an octagonal, chamfered and tapering shaft on an octagonal plinth and a three-step base. The lantern includes carvings of various items, including Gothic arches, a cross, a Christogram, a Tudor rose, and acanthus leaves. On the plinth are panels with inscriptions and the names of those lost in the First World War, and on the south side is a bronze plaque with the names of those lost in the Second World War.	II
Telephone kiosk 53.18503°N 2.83750°W	—	1935	A K6 type telephone kiosk, designed by Giles Gilbert Scott. It has a square plan, is in cast iron and has a domed top. The top panels contain unperforated crowns.	II

== See also ==
- Listed buildings in Barrow
- Listed buildings in Great Boughton
- Listed buildings in Guilden Sutton
- Listed buildings in Foulk Stapleford
- Listed buildings in Huntington
- Listed buildings in Huxley
- Listed buildings in Rowton
- Listed buildings in Tarvin
- Listed buildings in Waverton
