= William Huggins (animal artist) =

English painter

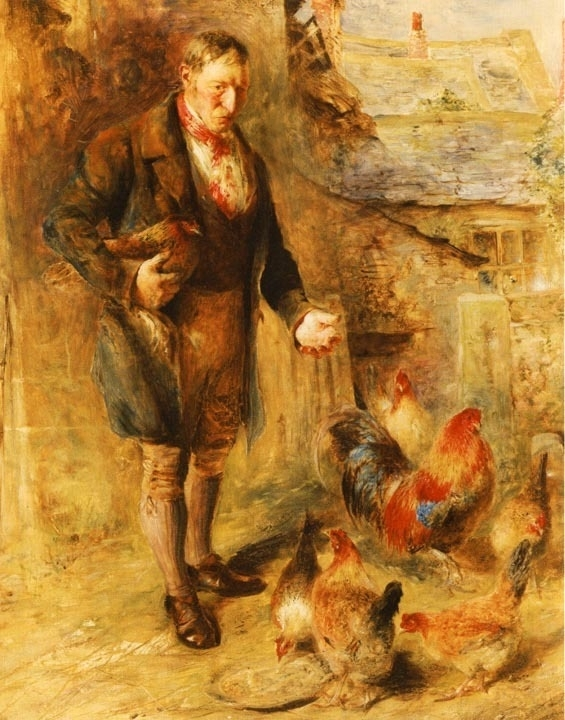
- Self portrait with chickens
- Born: May 1820; Liverpool, England
- Died: 25 February 1884 (aged 63); Christleton, Cheshire, England
- Known for: Painting birds and animals

William Huggins (May 1820 – 25 February 1884) was an English artist, from Liverpool, who specialised in drawing animals.

Huggins was a member of the Liverpool Academy of Arts. He enjoyed visiting Wombwell's Travelling Menagerie, an animal circus, and the Liverpool Zoological Gardens. Huggins has been compared to fellow Liverpool artist George Stubbs and is known for keeping his house full of pets.

== Life ==
William Huggins was born in Liverpool. His parents were called Samuel and Elizabeth. He received his first instruction in drawing at the Liverpool Mechanics' Institution. He won a prize for "Adam's Vision of the Death of Abel" and successfully entered work to be shown at the Liverpool Academy of Arts whilst fifteen years old. He drew from life using the classes at the Academy of Arts or by sketching the animals in Liverpool's zoo. He travelled further afield to see exotic animals at the unusual Wombwell's Travelling Menagerie. His animal work was admired and compared to Stubbs. Huggins was magnanimous in acknowledging Stubbs' influence and this contrasts with a later comparison that was made with Landseer where Huggins felt insulted. Huggins pictures of exotic animals were much admired but they are noted for lack of background as Huggins never saw them in their own habitat.

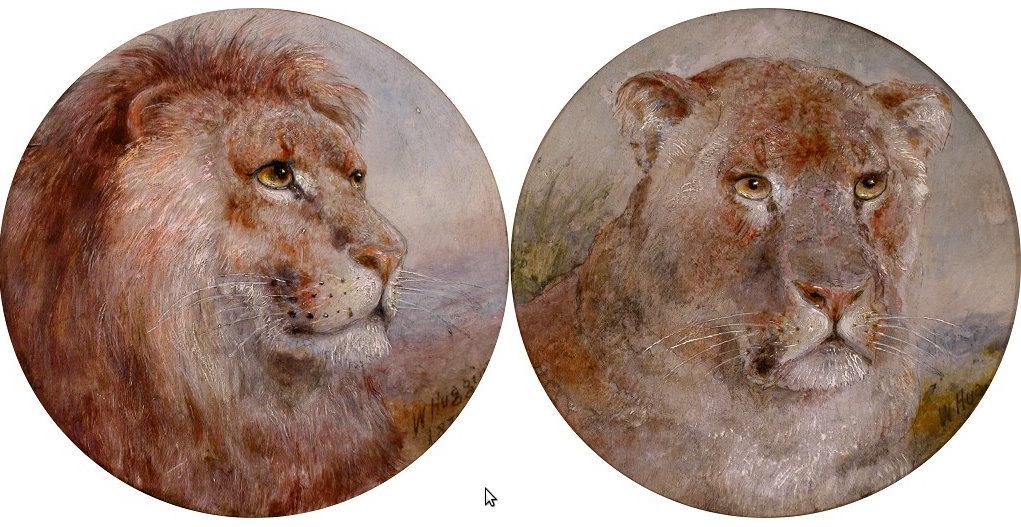
Lion and Lioness; a pair.

In 1845 Huggins changed his themes away from animals and chickens. His paintings were based on literary themes from Milton, Shelley and Spenser's "The Faerie Queene" and Moore's "Enchantress and Nourmahal"

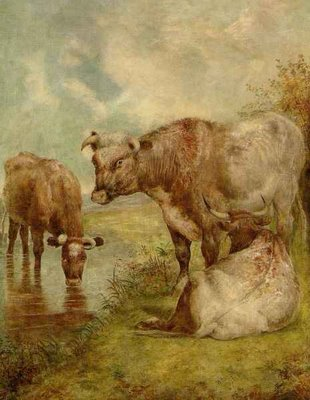
Cattle watering (1871)

Huggins first exhibited "Androcles and the lion" at the Royal Academy and made successful entries from 1846 until he was in his seventies. In addition he showed his paintings at most of the major cities in Great Britain. He was influenced in his use of glazes by the Pre-Raphaelites who also had exhibitions there. He became a full member of the Liverpool Academy in 1850 (resigning in 1856), but never became an RA (Royal Academician).

In 1861 Huggins moved to Chester where he lived with his brother, Samuel, until 1865. Huggins work at this time moved from animals to buildings (his brother, Samuel was a notable architectural writer). He painted Chester Cathedral which his brother was to go on to defend when it was to be restored. After leaving his brother, he painted the "Stones of Chester, or Ruins of St. John's" (1874) and the "Salmon Trap on the Dee". He moved to Betws-y-Coed in 1876 so that he could paint landscapes. One painting that resulted was, "The Fairy Glen" which was exhibited in Liverpool in 1877.

Huggins eventually moved from Wales and settled in and died in the Cheshire village of Christleton on 25 February 1884, just a year before his brother, Samuel. The brothers were buried in St James' Church, Christleton, and the headstone of their grave is a Grade II listed building.

== Work ==
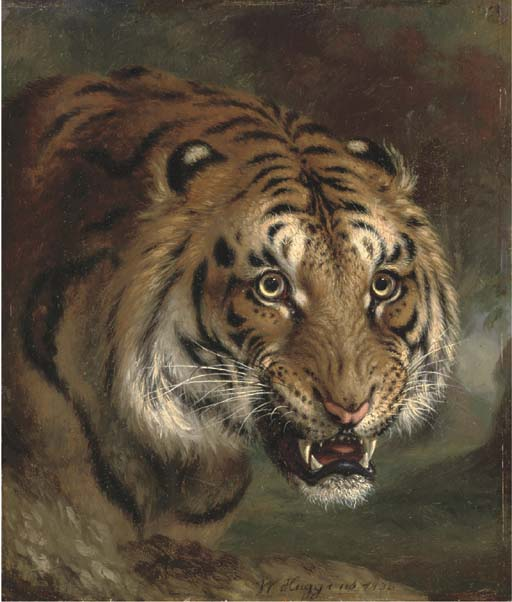
A Bengal Tiger was painted when he was 18

Huggins' horses, cattle, and poultry pictures were his best and most characteristic work, good in drawing, and remarkable for brilliance of colour. "Tried Friends", purchased by the Liverpool corporation, illustrates his use of transparent glazes over a white ground. Huggins' preferred medium was painting on white millboard from pencil outlines.

Huggins portrait include one of the master of the Holcombe Hunt, his brother Samuel and himself. He included his wife in "Aerial combat, the fight between the Eagle and the Serpent" which he painted in his literary phase and which illustrated Shelley's "Revolt of Islam."

Huggins has nearly 60 paintings in public collections in the United Kingdom.

According to art-historian and gallery owner Rupert Maas, "Huggins was an eccentric individual. He preferred the company of animals, especially chickens, than of his fellow men. He hated travelling through tunnels, and so would get off the train before Liverpool and walk the rest of the way home. His epitaph, which he composed himself, read: 'A just and compassionate man who would neither tread on a worm, nor cringe to an Emperor'."

=== Selected paintings ===
- A Jaguar (1838)
- Bideston Farmhouse (1850)
- Poultry in a Landscape (1856) (registration required)
- Barn Door Fowl (Rhode Island Reds) (1860)
- A Horse in the Stable (1866) (registration required)
- Portrait of a Newfoundland (1869)
- Portrait of a Boy (1869) (registration required)
