= Samuel Huggins =

British architect

- Born: 1811; Liverpool, England
- Died: 10 January 1885 (aged 73–74); Christleton, England
- Known for: Architecture

Samuel Huggins (1811–1885) was an English architect and writer. Huggins' defence of Classical architecture and opposition to a proposed restoration of Chester Cathedral led to the formation of the Society for the Protection of Ancient Buildings.

== Biography ==
Samuel Huggins was brought up in Liverpool but was born in Deal in Kent in 1811. His parents were called Samuel and Elizabeth. His younger brother, William, was a noted painter born in Liverpool (he created a portrait of Samuel which is extant).

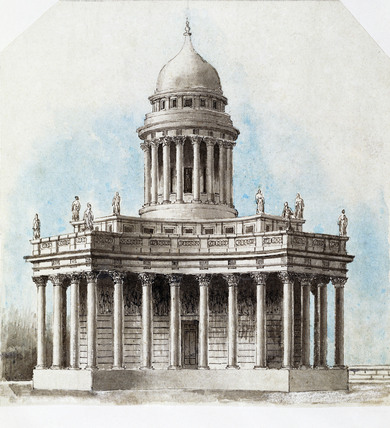
Design from Original Architectural Designs Chiefly Memorial and Monumental by Samuel Huggins

== Architect ==
Huggins was practising as an architect from 1846, and he wrote on architectural issues supporting the "classic" style. Within three years he had joined the Liverpool Architectural Society and he became its President from 1856 to 1858 – although at the time it was called The Liverpool Architectural and Archaeological Society. In 1868, Samuel demonstrated his interest in preserving the character of Liverpool's finer buildings when he addressed the Society in opposition to a proposed restoration of Chester Cathedral. His 1871 paper was titled On so-called restorations of our cathedral and abbey churches. The following year the Dean was obliged to answer the criticism.

Chester Cathedral's restoration created a great debate. The body of the building was based on a parish church which had not been maintained for several centuries. The new Dean, John Saul Howson had appointed Sir George Gilbert Scott to supervise the restoration. Scott proposed to make substantial changes to the building's design. Scott claimed to have archaeological evidence for his work, but it was less restoration and more like rebuilding. One of the larger changes was to shorten the south aisle and restyle it as an apse; but the changes proposed (and rejected) included the addition of a spire above the existing tower. The current building is acknowledged to be mainly the product of the Victorian restoration.

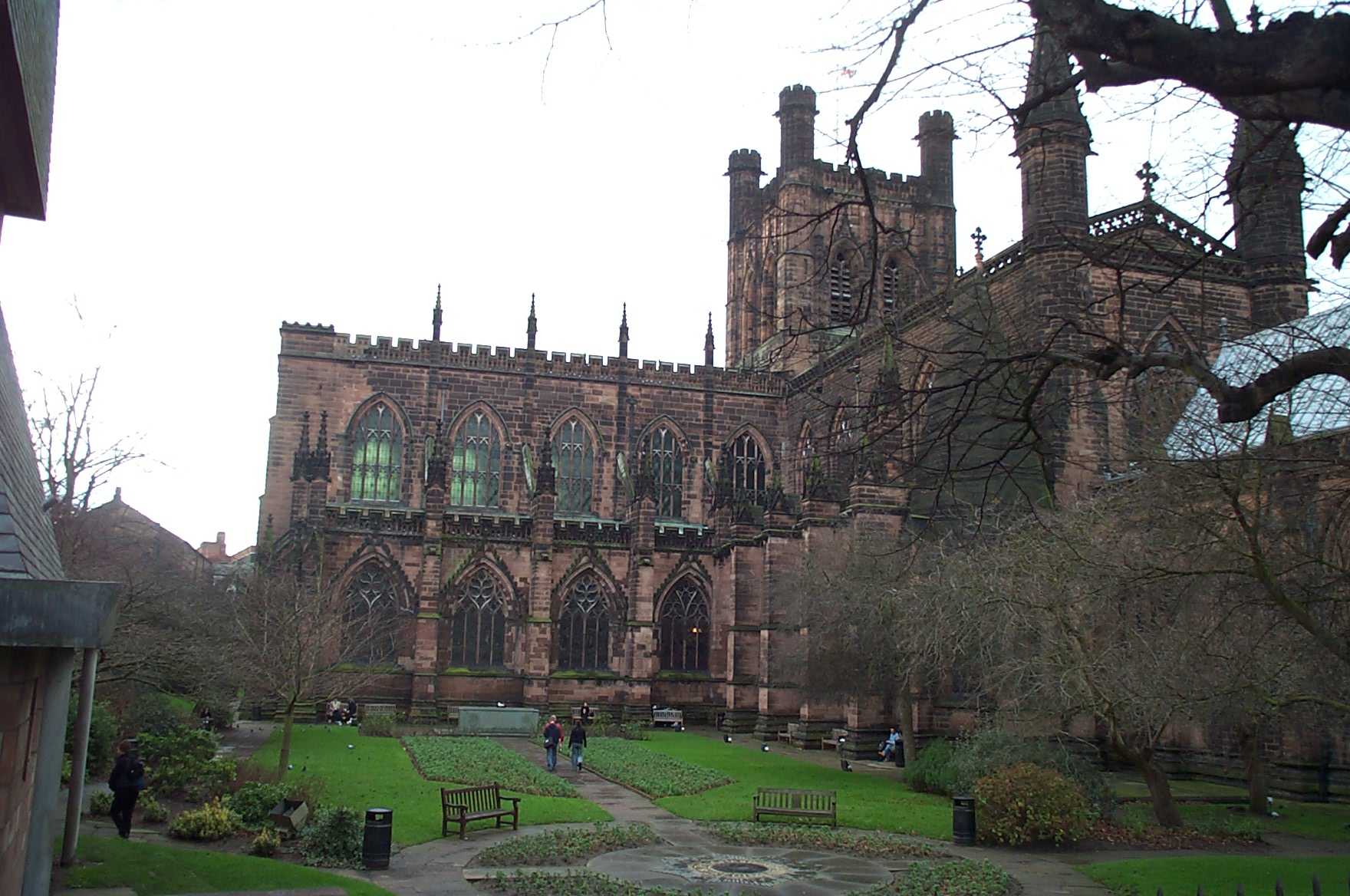
Chester Cathedral after the restoration.

Huggins' publications in "The Builder" in the 1850s are thought to have inspired other architects notably Alexander "Greek" Thomson to work in the classic style. His work was widely reported and drew attention in Melbourne.

The support gathered by Huggins led to the formation of the Society for the Protection of Ancient Buildings, a society founded by William Morris and Philip Webb.

Huggins lived with his brother from 1861 to 1865. They both died at Christleton. The brothers were buried in the same grave in St James' Church, Christleton, and the headstone of their grave is a Grade II listed building.

== Works include ==
- Original Architectural Designs chiefly Memorial and Monumental
- The Course and Current of Architecture, with a Chart of the History of Architecture (1863)
- On so-called restorations of our cathedral and abbey churches (1871)
- Catalogue of the Liverpool Free Public Library By Liverpool (England). Free Public Library (1872)
