= Legal Education Foundation =

The Legal Education Foundation
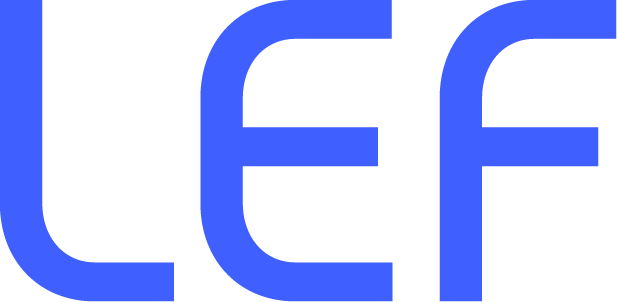
- Formation: 1962; 64 years ago
- Founded at: Guildford, UK
- Registration no.: 271297
- Legal status: Registered charity
- Purpose: Advancement of legal education and the sound development and administration of law
- Headquarters: 15 Alfred Place, London, WC1E 7EB
- Region served: UK
- Chief Executive: Matthew Smerdon
- Chair of Governors (trustees): Ben Kernighan
- Website: lef.org.uk
- Formerly called: The College of Law

The Legal Education Foundation (LEF) is an independent grant-making foundation operating across the UK to build a society that fosters the principles of justice and fairness, where people understand and use law to bring about positive change and to prevent harm, and where public systems and structures uphold the rule of law. It was founded in 1962 as The College of Law and constituted in its present form in 2012.

== History ==
The charity began in 1962 when the Law Society's own law college (founded in 1903) merged with the tutorial firm Gibson and Weldon (founded in 1876) to form the College of Law with branches in London and Guildford. The College of Law was a private teaching institution which operated as a charity. It was incorporated by royal charter in 1975 and officially registered as a charity in 1976 "to promote the advancement of legal education and the study of law in all its branches". It never received Higher Education Funding Council funds and was dependent solely on its own resources to operate the college and finance its growth. In 2006, the college was granted degree-awarding powers and began a collaboration with the Sutton Trust to fund the trust's Pathways to Law program which encourages and supports disadvantaged secondary school students who wish to study law. Until 2012, the College of Law was in the top 100 of UK charities ranked by expenditure.

In 2012, the College Of Law underwent a major restructuring which split off the educational institution from its parent charity. College of Law Ltd. was created as a limited company to take on its educational and training business on a for-profit basis. The parent charity changed its name to The Legal Education Foundation and remained under the royal charter. In November of that year the college was granted university status. Shortly thereafter it was sold to Montagu Private Equity for £200 million. The proceeds of the sale went to The Legal Education Foundation, while the £177 million debt incurred by Montagu for the purchase was transferred to the college itself. The college subsequently changed its name to the University of Law.

== Activities ==
The newly constituted The Legal Education Foundation officially launched on 10 July 2013 with the announcement of its first six grants and the appointment of Matthew Smerdon as its first CEO. Smerdon was recruited from the Baring Foundation, where he specialised in funding the legal advice sector. The charity had begun investing its £200 million endowment in April 2013 with its investment managers instructed to preserve the value of the fund in real terms and produce an annual income of 3.5%. By the beginning of 2015, it had distributed approximately £5m in grants to nearly 70 projects which were designed to increase accessibility to legal services or to increase public understanding of the law. The foundation also initiated and runs the Justice First fellowship program which funds trainee solicitors who wish to work in the social welfare sector. In 2014, it awarded Justice First fellowships to eight law graduates recruited from a field of 161 applicants. In 2016, the program was expanded to include two further fellowships for trainee barristers. The charity has continued and expanded its collaboration with the Sutton Trust in the Pathways to Law program and also collaborates with the Baring Foundation in widening public access to legal advice. In addition to the income from its own endowment, the Legal Education Foundation also receives grants for its projects from general funding organizations such as Comic Relief and the Esmée Fairbairn Foundation.
