= Thorrun Govind =

British pharmacist, solicitor and broadcaster

- Education: King's College London (MPharm); University of Law (GDL)
- Occupations: Pharmacist, solicitor, broadcaster
- Board member of: Royal Pharmaceutical Society's English Pharmacy Board
- Website: www.thorrun.co.uk

Thorrun Govind is a British pharmacist, solicitor and broadcaster. In 2021, she was elected chair of the Royal Pharmaceutical Society in England. Govind is a member of the Junior Solicitors Network advisory committee.

== Education ==
Govind graduated from King's College London in 2015. She completed a Graduate Diploma in Law at the University of Law in 2018, followed by the Legal Practice Course with an MSc in Law, Business and Management in 2019, studying at the university's Manchester campus. She combined her legal studies with work in community pharmacy.

== Career ==
Govind trained at Hempsons from 2019 to 2021 and worked there as a healthcare advisory and inquest lawyer from 2021 to 2024. She subsequently worked as a solicitor at Brabners from 2024 to 2026. Her legal work has included representing individuals and organisations at inquests and assisting with regulatory proceedings.

In 2018, Govind was nominated for the NHS 70 Parliamentary Awards - Healthier Communities Award for her advocacy. In the same year Govind was named one of the Top 5 Rising Star's in Healthcare by WeAretheCity, an organisation that works with over 150 corporate organisations to attract, retain and develop female talent.

Govind was the Resident Pharmacist at BBC Radio Lancashire, on presenter John Gilmore's show.

Govind was asked to provide healthcare comment on the COVID-19 pandemic. She highlighted the challenges pharmacists and healthcare teams face. She has also spoken on a number of outlets including BBC News about the key role of pharmacists and healthcare teams in tackling vaccine hesitancy in relation to both Coronavirus and Influenza Vaccines.

In 2021 Govind spoke to Sky News about access to the contraception pill from pharmacies. She stated that 'it's absolutely right that women should be able to access contraception easily in a safe environment.' In 2022, Govind helped highlight women's health inequalities as an expert for Menopause Mandate.

In March 2023, Govind appeared on This Morning with Dr Nighat Arif following the MHRA withdrawal of a number of cough medicines containing the ingredient pholcodine in the UK.

Govind was first elected to the Royal Pharmaceutical Society's English Pharmacy Board in 2018, the youngest elected board member. She was subsequently elected to chair the Royal Pharmaceutical Society's English Pharmacy Board in 2021, the youngest elected chair that the organisation has had. Her tenure as chair concluded in 2023.

In 2022, Govind became a Councillor at the Commonwealth Pharmacists Association.

== Selected publications ==
- Robinson, Anna; Sile, Laura; Govind, Thorrun; Guraya, Harpreet Kaur; O'Brien, Nicola; Harris, Vicki; Pilkington, Guy; Todd, Adam; Husband, Andy (2022-04-05). "'He or she maybe doesn't know there is such a thing as a review': A qualitative investigation exploring barriers and facilitators to accessing medication reviews from the perspective of people from ethnic minority communities". Health Expectations: hex.13482. doi:10.1111/hex.13482. ISSN 1369-6513
- Robinson, Anna; O'Brien, Nicola; Sile, Laura; Guraya, Harpreet K.; Govind, Thorrun; Harris, Vicki; Pilkington, Guy; Todd, Adam; Husband, Andy (2022-12). "Recommendations for community pharmacy to improve access to medication advice for people from ethnic minority communities: A qualitative person‐centred codesign study". Health Expectations. 25 (6): 3040–3052.
