= Christleton Old Hall =

Country house in Cheshire, England

Coordinates: 53.18552°N 2.83673°W

Christleton Old Hall is a former country house in the village of Christleton, Cheshire, England.

It was built in the early 17th century as a timber-framed house by a member of the Egerton family but around 1870, when being used as a rectory, was encased in Ruabon red brick whilst the Rev Lionel Garnett was rector. The house is built in two and three storeys with Welsh slate roofs. The entrance front has seven bays. The interior of the house contains "much good Jacobean plasterwork and panelling". The house is recorded in the National Heritage List for England as a designated Grade II* listed building. The gate piers, gates and garden walls are listed at Grade II. The remains of tunnels still surround the house, possibly connecting it to the village church.

It was bought c.1710 by Gerard Townsend, a Chester merchant, who left it to his son Robert Townsend, a lawyer and the Recorder of Chester. It has been subsequently owned by The Ince Family, Mrs Mary Legh, J Verney Lace and Major & Mrs Currie. In 1946 it was acquired by the Guest Williams brothers, who were related by marriage to the Ince, Legh and Currie families. Since the sale of the property in 1974, it has been substantially restored.

== See also ==
- Grade II* listed buildings in Cheshire West and Chester
- Listed buildings in Christleton
