= Christleton Hall =

Country house in Cheshire, England

Coordinates: 53.18578°N 2.84234°W

Christleton Hall is a former country house in the village of Christleton, Cheshire, England. It was built in about 1750 for Townsend Ince. The building was later used as a boarding school. In 1934 the Salvatorians purchased the hall from the Hemelryk family, From 1974 to 2021, the hall and its grounds was a law college, one of the campuses of the University of Law.

Additions were made to it in the middle of the 19th century, and in the early part of the 20th century. The house is constructed in red brick with stone dressings, and has a Welsh slate roof. It is in three stories, and has a south front of four bays, three of which are from the original house. The hall is recorded in the National Heritage List for England as a designated Grade II listed building. The 20th-century additions are excluded from the listing.

The University of Law sold the site in 2019; the campus will remain in Christleton until summer 2021. Cheshire West and Chester's planning committee in 2022 approved proposals to convert the hall into 18 apartments and build 24 detached houses on the site.

== See also ==
- Listed buildings in Christleton
