= Marcia Hutchinson =

British politician (born 1962)

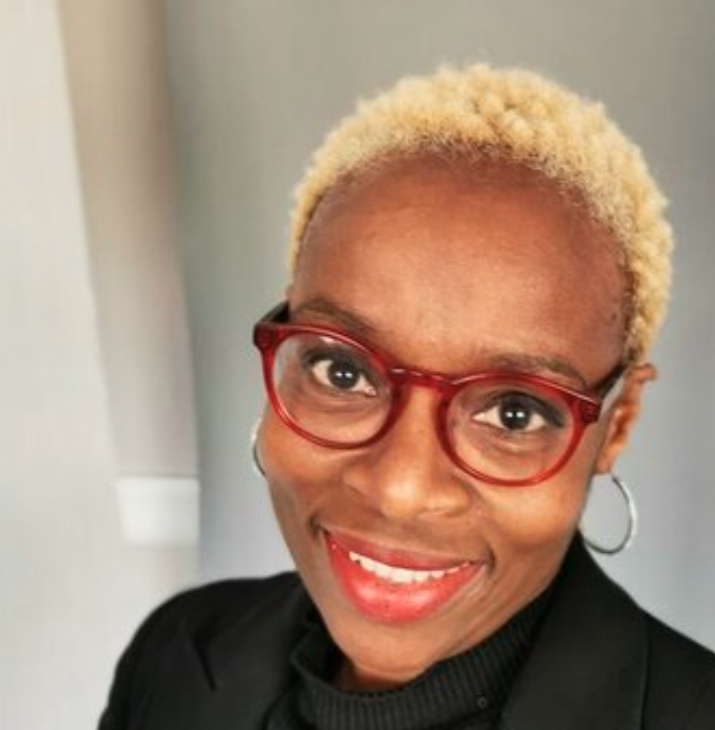
- Hutchinson in 2022

Personal details
- Born: 11 December 1962 (age 63)
- Party: Labour (2016–2021); Independent (2021–present)
- Education: Brasenose College, Oxford (BA); University of Law (LPC)

Marcia Ann Hutchinson MBE (born 11 December 1962) is a British writer, and politician.

== Early life and education ==
Born 11 December 1962, Hutchinson's parents were both part of the Windrush Generation of post-war migrants to the UK. She is the seventh of nine children, seven girls and two boys. Her younger sister Yvonne Hutchinson, who died in 2015, was a noted housing campaigner in Bradford. Her four older siblings remained in Jamaica and her parents had five more children in Bradford in the 1960s. She grew up in Manningham, Bradford, a deprived area of the city. The family later moved to Newby Square, a notorious council estate which was demolished in 1987.

Hutchinson attended Belle Vue Girl's Comprehensive School in Bradford. She was the first pupil from the school to be admitted to Oxford University attending Brasenose College from 1982 to 1985 reading jurisprudence. After attending the College of Law in Lancaster Gate, Hutchinson qualified as a solicitor in 1986 and worked for a number of firms specialising in Town and Country Planning, first In the City in London and then in Leeds.

== Publishing ==
After her two daughters were born, Hutchinson changed careers and founded Primary Colours, a multicultural educational publishing and training company based in Huddersfield. The company operated between 1997 and 2014 publishing a range of books and teaching packs as well as delivering Theatre in Education, INSET training on diversity and cultural diversity projects in schools and other educational settings around the country. These included The Journey, a teaching pack based on the stories of Windrush Migrants to Yorkshire published to mark the 50th Anniversary of the Empire Windrush arriving in the UK, with a foreword written by Paul Boateng MP.

Going and Coming - a digital project and teaching pack which enabled children to record their family's migration stories, with a foreword written by Hilary Benn MP.

The Adventures of Ottobah Cugoano - which told the story of an enslaved boy brought to the UK who campaigned against slavery. The Foreword for the pack was written by then Minister for Culture David Lammy MP.

Did you Know? - A teaching pack documenting the contribution of Black and Asian Asian people to the UK. The series was the brainchild of Headteacher Shazia Azhar MBE who became a director of Primary Colours and wrote a number of resources for the company.

Hutchinson was awarded an MBE in the Queens Birthday Honours list in 2010 for services to cultural diversity.

== Politics ==
Hutchinson joined the Labour Party in 2016. In response to the underrepresentation of Black Councillors in the City of Manchester (who in 2017 made up 12% of the population of the city but just 3% of councillors) she set up the Pipeline Project. In 2021 three Pipeline Project Alumni including Hutchinson were elected as Labour Councillors.

She resigned in December 2021 because of the "toxic culture" of the ruling Labour group on the council.

In May 2022, she appeared in The Guardian's Dining across the divide feature discussing attitudes to immigration and racism.

== Writing ==
Hutchinson's solo novel The Mercy Step, inspired by her early life in Bradford, was published by Cassava Republic in July 2025. The Mercy Step won a British Book Award and was shortlisted for the Womens Prize for Fiction. Hutchinson was named one of the 10 best new novelists of 2025 by The Observer.
