= Billy Matthews (footballer, born 1883) =

Welsh footballer

Billy Mathews
Personal information
- Full name: William Mathews
- Date of birth: 1882
- Place of birth: Rhyl, Wales
- Date of death: 29 April 1921 (aged 37–38)
- Place of death: Christleton, England
- Position: Half back

Senior career*
Years	Team	Apps	(Gls)
–1904	Rhyl		
1904–1906	Chester		
1906–1907	Rhyl		
1907–1919	Chester		

International career
1905–1908	Wales	2	(0)
- * Club domestic league appearances and goals

William Mathews (1882 – 29 April 1921), sometimes known as Billy Mathews or William Mathews, was a Welsh professional footballer who played in non-League football for Chester and Rhyl as a half back. He was capped by Wales twice, in 1905 versus Ireland and in 1908 versus England.

== Personal life ==
Mathews was son of William and Elizabeth Mathews of Rhyl, Flintshire. He was married to Annie and had two children. Prior to becoming a professional footballer, he worked as a labourer and as an electric engine driver. In 1915, during the second year of the First World War, he enlisted in the Royal Welsh Fusiliers, but ultimately served as a Shoeing Smith with the Royal Field Artillery. In 1921, Mathews died of heart disease related to his war service and was buried in Christleton near Chester.

== Honours ==
Chester

- The Combination: 1908–09

== See also ==
- List of Wales international footballers (alphabetical)
- Wales Football Data Archive
