= St James' Church, Christleton =

Church in Cheshire, England

Coordinates: 53.1856°N 2.8383°W

- St James' Church, Christleton, from the south

- Location in Cheshire
- OS grid reference: SJ 440 657
- Location: Christleton, Cheshire
- Country: England
- Denomination: Anglican
- Website: St James, Christleton

History
- Status: Parish church

Architecture
- Functional status: Active
- Heritage designation: Grade II*
- Designated: 1 June 1967
- Architect: William Butterfield
- Architectural type: Church
- Style: Gothic Revival
- Completed: 1877

Specifications
- Materials: Ashlar red and white sandstone Green slate roof

Administration
- Province: York
- Diocese: Chester
- Archdeaconry: Chester
- Deanery: Chester
- Parish: Christleton

Clergy
- Rector: Rev. Malcolm Cowan

St James' Church is in the village of Christleton, Cheshire, England. The church is recorded in the National Heritage List for England as a designated Grade II* listed building. It is an active Anglican parish church in the diocese of Chester, the archdeaconry of Chester and the deanery of Chester. It is the only Cheshire church designed by William Butterfield.

== History ==
The name of the village is recorded in the Domesday Book and it is likely that a church was on the site at this time. In 1093 the patronage of the church was given to the monks of St Werburgh's Abbey, Chester. The church was rebuilt in stone around 1490, and the tower built at this time is still present. The church sustained considerable damage during the Civil War and around 1730 the nave and chancel were repaired. However, during a service in 1873 the roof of the nave partly collapsed. Plans for rebuilding the church were prepared by Butterfield, retaining the 15th-century tower, adding gargoyles to each corner and a short spire to the turret. The rebuilding took place between 1874 and 1878.

== Architecture ==
=== Exterior ===
The church is built in ashlar red and white sandstone with a green slate roof. Its plan consists of a nave and chancel in one range with a clerestory, north and south aisles, a south porch, side chapels to the chancel, and a west tower. The tower is in two stages with diagonal buttresses and a stair turret at the southeast angle. It has a three-light west window. The bell openings have two lights and are louvred. The parapets are embattled and have gargoyles. On top of the tower is a shingled pyramidal cap.

=== Interior ===
The interior is decorated with red and white sandstone with a chequerboard pattern added in the upper portion. There is no chancel arch, but between the nave and the chancel is a tympanum marking the division. In the chancel is a large alabaster reredos having panels filled with mosaic. The chancel is floored with Minton tiles. The west window dated 1877 is by Gibbs and much of the other stained glass is by the firm of Kempe, and is dated between 1884 and 1904. In the north aisle is a window dating from about 1986 by Cliff Boddy, and there is a window celebrating the 2000 millennium in the south transept by Bill Davies. A large painted panel of the royal arms dated 1665 is by Randle Holme III. The font is made from Sicilian marble on a Derbyshire limestone base. The churchwardens' benches have canopies. The altar table is Jacobean. Also in the church is a carving of a pelican feeding her young with her own blood, and an old village constable's staff. The two-manual organ was built by George Holdich, and rebuilt around 1990 by Rushworth and Dreaper. There is a ring of eight bells cast in 1928 by John Taylor and Company.

== External features ==
In the churchyard is an ashlar red sandstone sundial from the mid-late 18th century, and the headstone of William Huggins and members of his family dated 1884. Both of these are listed at Grade II. Also listed at Grade II is the lych gate which was designed by Butterfield and is built from ashlar red sandstone and timber framing with a Welsh slate roof and a red tile ridge. The churchyard contains the war graves of six soldiers of World War I, including former Wales international footballer Billy Matthews who is commemorated as 'Shoeing Smith William Mathews, Royal Field Artillery, and a soldier and a Home Guardsman of World War II.

== See also ==
- Grade II* listed buildings in Cheshire West and Chester
- Listed buildings in Christleton
