= University of Law =

Private university in England

The University of Law
- Former names: The College of Law of England and Wales (1962–2012)
- Motto: Latin: Leges Juraque Cognoscamus
- Motto in English: Let us know the laws and rights
- Type: for-profit
- Established: 1962; 64 years ago, 2012 (university status)
- Parent institution: Global University Systems
- Chancellor: The Lord Neuberger of Abbotsbury
- President: The Lord Grabiner
- Vice-Chancellor: Andrea Nollent
- Students: 19,730 (2024/25)
- Location: Birmingham, Bristol, Leeds, London, Manchester, Nottingham
- Campus: Urban
- Colours: Cerulean blue and violet
- Website: law.ac.uk

The University of Law (founded in 1962 as the College of Law of England and Wales) is a publicly-funded, for-profit university in the United Kingdom, providing undergraduate and postgraduate degrees in law, business, psychology, criminology, policing and computer science. It also provides postgraduate courses in education, and specialist legal training and continuing professional development courses for British barristers, solicitors and trainees; it is the United Kingdom's largest law school. It traces its origins to 1876.

The College of Law had been incorporated by royal charter as a charity in 1975, but in 2012, prior to the granting of university status, its educational and training business was split off and incorporated as a private limited company. This became the College of Law Limited and later the University of Law Limited. The college was granted degree-awarding powers in 2006, and in 2012 changed its name to the University of Law (ULaw) when it became the UK's first for-profit educational institution to be granted university status.

The charitable branch, which remained incorporated by the 1975 royal charter, became the Legal Education Foundation. Shortly after the granting of university status and being renamed the University of Law in 2012, the College of Law Limited was bought by Montagu Private Equity. Three years later, Montagu sold the company to its present owner, the Netherlands-based company Global University Systems.

The university has multiple locations in the UK in Birmingham, Bristol, Leeds, London (Bloomsbury and Moorgate) Manchester and Nottingham, and (as of October 2026) at the universities of East Anglia, Exeter, Hull, Lancaster, Leicester, Liverpool, Newcastle, Oxford Brookes, Royal Holloway, Sheffield, Southampton and Reading, as well as an online campus.

== History ==
=== 20th century ===
The Law Society of England and Wales created The College of Law in 1962 by merging its own solicitors' training school, the Law Society School of Law (founded in 1903) with the tutorial firm Gibson and Weldon (established in 1876). The coat of arms were officially granted on 5 September 1967 to the then College of Law. The arms were depicted with the motto Leges Juraque Cognoscamus ("Let us know the laws and rights"). The crest was deprecated when the institution became a private limited company.

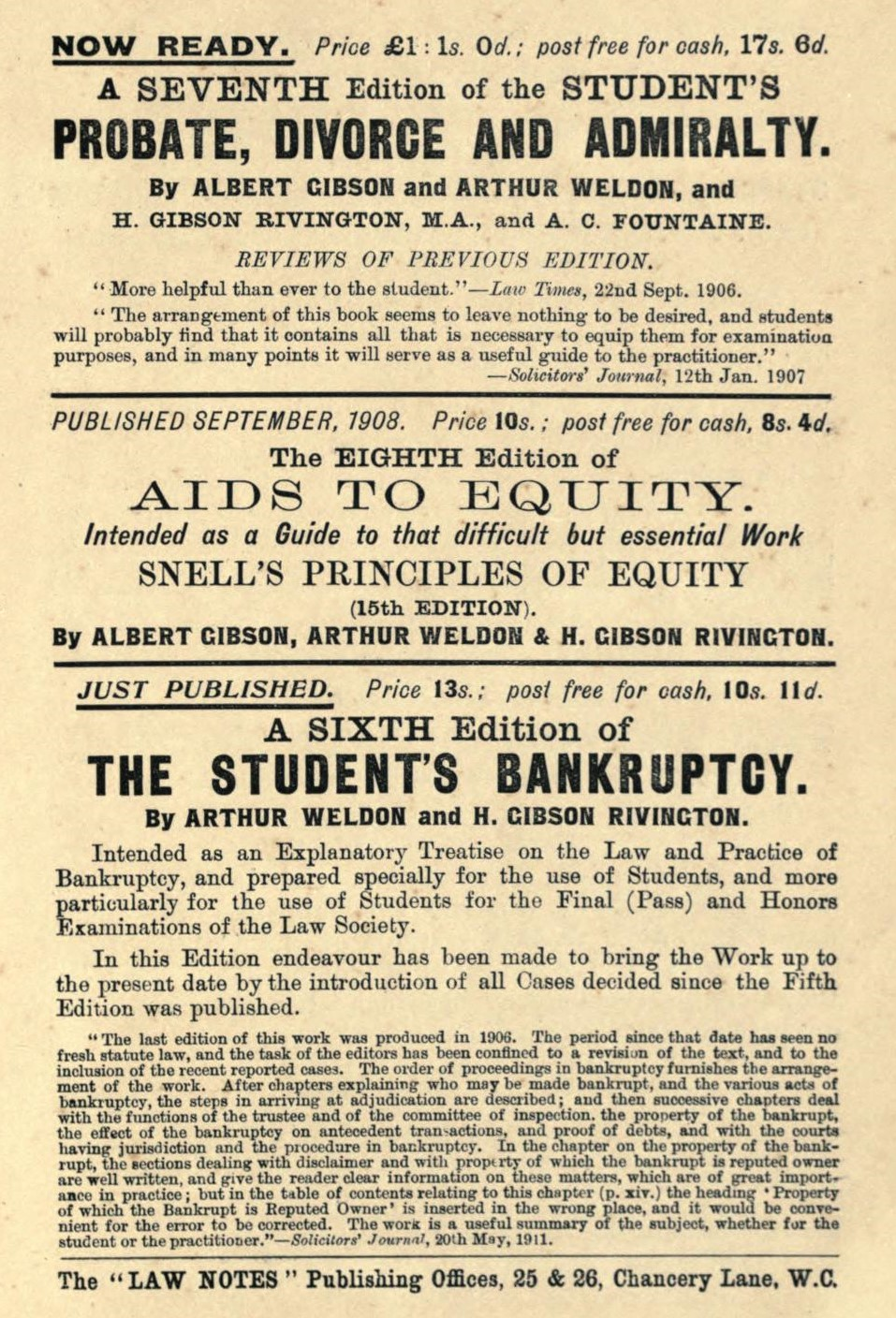
The advertisement for three of Gibson and Weldon's law books (1911)

The college was created in its legal form by Royal Charter on 5 December 1975. It was registered as a charity on 24 May 1976, with the aim "to promote the advancement of legal education and the study of law in all its branches". Until the transfer of its training business to The College of Law Limited in 2012, The College of Law was in the top 100 of UK charities ranked by expenditure.

Following the recommendations of the Ormrod Report on the reform of legal education in England and Wales, The Law Society submitted proposals in 1975 for a 36-week Final Examination course for aspiring solicitors and a Common Professional Examination (CPE) or law conversion course for non-law graduates to be taught at The College of Law. The first CPE was held in 1978. The number of institutions approved to deliver the CPE gradually increased until by 2006 the BPP Law School and 27 universities, most of them former polytechnics, were also running the course. However, the leading providers of the CPE (now called the Graduate Diploma in Law) remained The College of Law and BPP Law School, whose enrollments still dwarfed those of the universities in 2010.

In the 1980s, The Law Society asked the college to produce a scheme for additional tuition in accounts for articled clerks (now trainee solicitors), combining distance learning with one-day's attendance at lectures. Further distance learning courses were developed in a partnership with The Open University beginning in 1998. The Guildford campus of the college also established the Fresh Start distance learning course for solicitors returning to practice after a career break or those wishing to change their specialisation.

The 1990s saw a change in the relationship between The Law Society and The College of Law. In 1994, Nigel Savage, then the dean of Nottingham Trent University's law school, called for a review of the link between the college and The Law Society which had eight of its council members on the college's board of governors. Savage suggested that this gave the college an unfair advantage in recruiting students to the Legal Practice Course which had been set up by The Law Society in 1993 to replace the Final Examination course. The society also regulated the course and determined which institutions would receive a licence to deliver it. He proposed that the college should either "come clean" about the relationship and declare itself the official college of The Law Society or sever the link and become completely independent. The college subsequently severed the link, and The Law Society stopped appointing college governors. Savage went on to become the president and CEO of The College of Law in 1996 and served in that capacity for the next 18 years.

=== 21st century ===
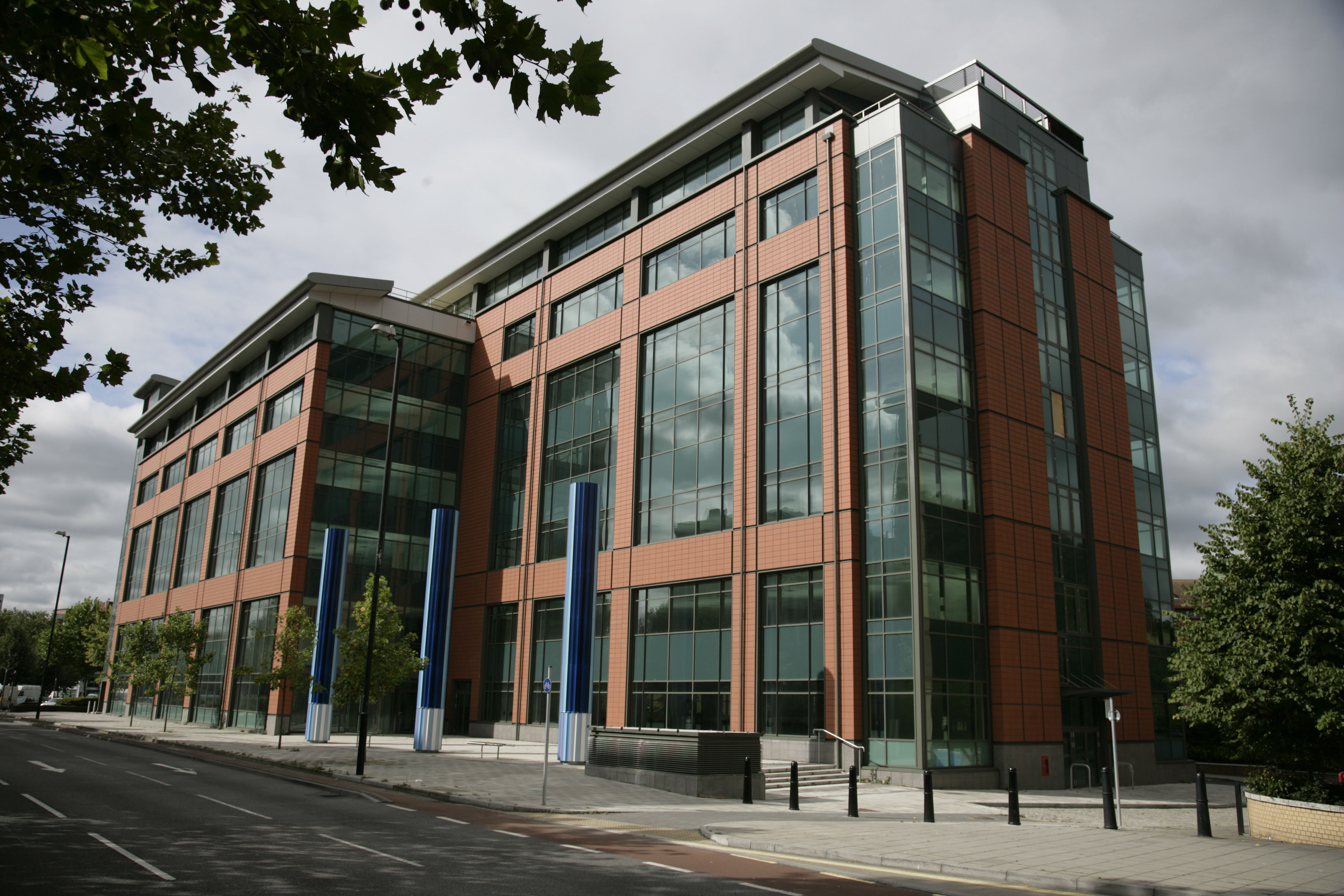
Bristol campus in 2007

The college was granted degree-awarding powers by the Privy Council in 2006, leading to development of its bachelor and master of laws degree programmes. The London Moorgate centre was also opened that year. According to the University of Law, the Moorgate centre is the UK's largest corporate-specific law school.

In 2012, the College of Law underwent a major restructuring. The College of Law Limited was created as a private limited company to take on its educational and training business. The parent charity changed its name to the Legal Education Foundation. In April of that year, Montagu Private Equity agreed to buy the College of Law Limited for approximately £200 million. On 22 November 2012, it was announced that the college had been granted full university status and its name would be changed to the "University of Law". Shortly thereafter, Montague Private Equity completed the acquisition process. This raised questions about the legality of transferring the degree-awarding powers granted under royal charter to the original College of Law to the newly created company, and then selling that company, now with university status, to a for-profit provider. The UK Department for Business, Innovation and Skills explained that while degree-awarding powers cannot be transferred, when a whole institute changes its legal status, the powers remain with it. This was considered to be the case with the University of Law because all of the original College of Law's education and training business had been transferred to the for-profit college, and the activities remaining with the chartered body were not related to the degree-awarding powers. Dame Fiona Woolf was named the newly created university's first chancellor in 2013.

The Open University's courses in law (including the LLB by distance learning) were offered in association with The University of Law. However, the Open University announced in 2013 that this partnership was being phased out and would end completely in 2018.

The university began selling off its property portfolio on a leaseback basis in 2014, starting with the four buildings of its Bloomsbury campus. According to analysis of the university's accounts earlier that year by the Times Higher Education Supplement, the purchase by Montagu Private Equity in 2012 had loaded the university with £177m of debt. Critics had compared the purchase by Montagu Private Equity to the leveraged buyouts of Premier League clubs in English football. At the time, the University of Law's ultimate parent company was L-J Holdco Ltd., which was incorporated in Guernsey and majority owned by Montagu-managed funds.

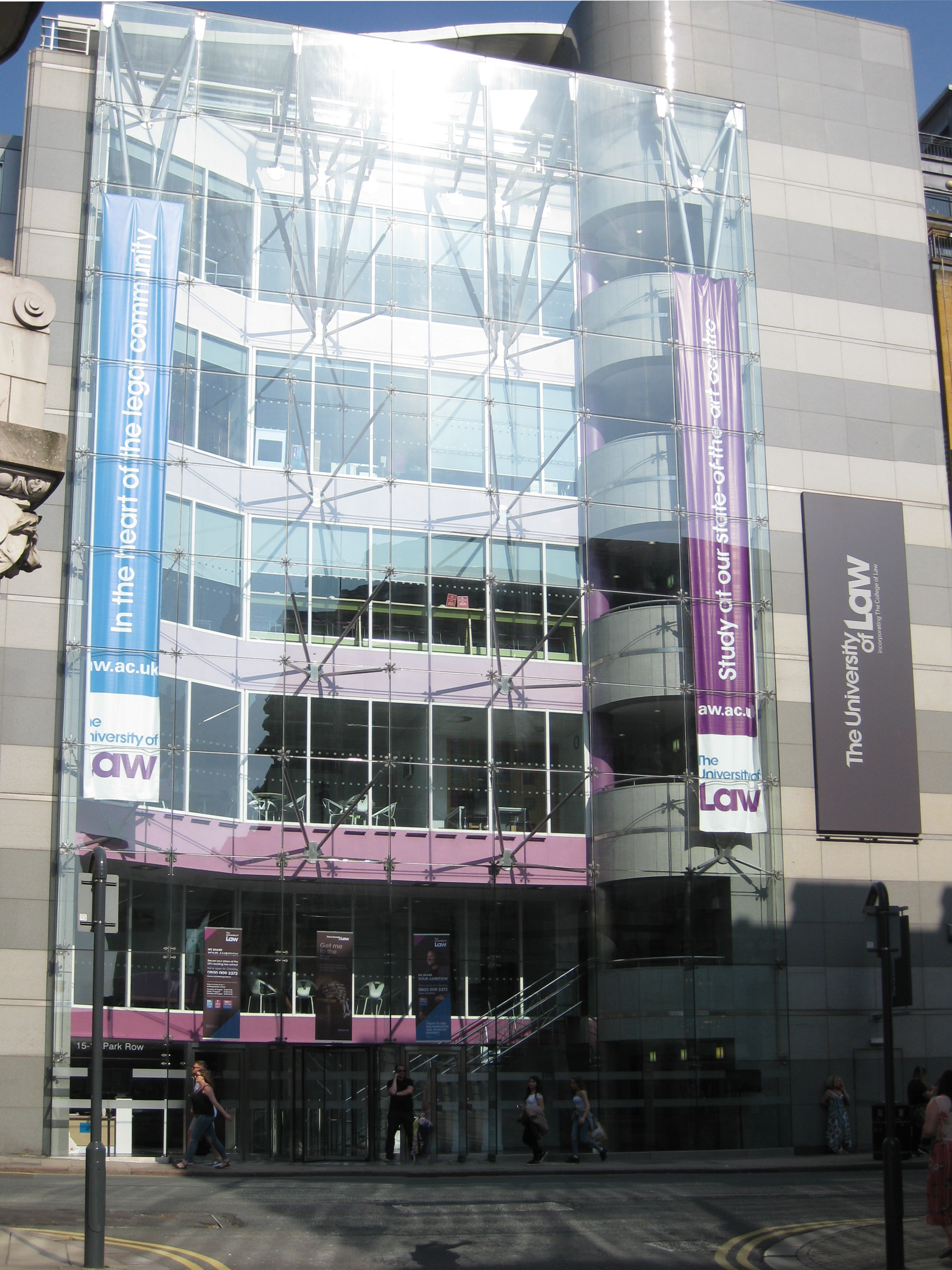
Leeds campus in 2018

In June 2015, Montagu Private Equity sold the university to Global University Systems (GUS) for an undisclosed sum. Former UK Education and Employment Secretary and Home Secretary David Blunkett, at the time a visiting lecturer at the London School of Business and Finance (also owned by Global University Systems), was named chairman of the board. The University of Law announced the launch of its De Broc School of Business in July 2015, but it had to defer the first intake of students (originally planned for September of that year) due to low student recruitment. (Note: The new business school's name was taken from Ralph de Broc, the 12th-century owner of Braboeuf Manor, now the site of the university's Guildford campus.)

The College of Law had established pro bono clinics, with students undertaking legal advice work for free supervised by the college's lecturers. In March 2015, the University of Law obtained an alternative business structure licence, allowing it to expand its legal advice clinics. It also restructured its Legal Practice Courses to give students more choice and won contracts to develop law firm-specific LPC programmes for three magic circle firms – Allen & Overy, Clifford Chance and Linklaters. However, by the end of 2014, it had retained only Linklaters, having lost the contracts with Allen & Overy and Clifford Chance, who moved to BPP Law School. ULaw also established a one-year foundation programme for international students wishing to progress to undergraduate legal study in the UK.

The summer of 2015 also saw a restructuring of the university's governance. The provost, Andrea Nollent, also assumed the role of Chief Academic Officer. John Latham, who had been its CEO and president since 2014 and had overseen the sale of the University of Law to Global University Systems, resigned by "mutual consent". The office of president became a non-executive position and was assumed by Lord Grabiner. David Johnston, the former chief operating officer, took over as CEO. Johnston was subsequently replaced as CEO by economist Stelios Platis in April 2016. In turn, Platis stepped down in October 2016 and was replaced by Professor Andrea Nollent.

In September 2018, Lord Neuberger of Abbotsbury, the former president of the Supreme Court of the United Kingdom, was appointed to succeed Dame Fiona Woolf as the university's chancellor.

In 2019, the university was registered with the Office for Students as an "Approved (fee cap)" provider, making it eligible for public teaching grants and full loan support for its students.

In January 2021, Legal Practice Course students complained that the university had given them an exam on a topic they hadn't yet been taught. The university apologised for the mix-up. It was also reported that month that the University of Law's owner Global University Systems was looking to sell a portion of its stake in the university.

== Campuses ==
The University of Law has campuses in the UK located in Birmingham, Bristol, Leeds, London (Bloomsbury and Moorgate), Manchester and Nottingham. It also delivers graduate diploma in law and legal practice programmes at other UK universities, including: University of Exeter (since 2015), University of Reading (since 2017), University of Liverpool (since 2018), and University of East Anglia (since 2019).

The university opened an international branch in Hong Kong in 2019, which operated out of a serviced office. The Christleton (Chester) campus was sold in 2019 and closed in 2021.

On 30 June 2024, the Guildford campus was closed after being acquired by Elysian Residences.

== Academic profile ==
As of 2018, courses and degrees offered by the university include Bachelor of Laws (LLB), the Bar Professional Training Course, graduate diploma in law, the Legal Practice Course, Master of Laws (LLM) in legal practice, Master of Science (MSc) in law, governance, risk and compliance, and the professional skills course (for trainee solicitors on day-release).

The University of Law does not feature in the Academic Ranking of World Universities (also known as the Shanghai Ranking) or Times Higher Education university rankings (including QS World University Rankings), as the rankings exclude small and/or specialist institutions.

The university received an overall "silver" rating in the UK government's Teaching Excellence Framework 2023, with "gold" for student experience and "silver" for student outcomes.

== Controversies ==
In 2023, the University of Law (ULaw) reported a £400,000 loss, a stark contrast to the £30 million pre-tax profit recorded in the previous year. The university attributed this decline primarily to a £15.6 million write-off in aged debt, which it linked to financial difficulties stemming from the COVID-19 pandemic. The debt write-off was reportedly due to unpaid tuition fees, particularly from students whose funding applications were unsuccessful or who failed to meet loan repayment obligations.

ULaw's ownership under Global University Systems (GUS) has also attracted scrutiny. The university, originally a not-for-profit institution, was sold to Montagu Private Equity in 2012, resulting in the loss of its charitable status. Since 2015, it has been owned by GUS, a for-profit education provider led by Aaron Etingen. Etingen has previously faced criticism over management practices at other GUS institutions, including the London College of Contemporary Arts, where lecturers reported significant administrative failings and inadequate teaching resources. In 2015, one of GUS’s colleges was temporarily suspended from the UK student loans system due to concerns over dropout rates, though it was later reinstated.

=== Student deportation controversy ===
In April 2023, the University of Law faced criticism over the handling of an international student's visa situation. A Pakistani student was instructed by ULaw to arrive in the UK earlier than initially planned to commence his course. However, due to a miscommunication regarding the appropriate arrival date, he entered the country before his visa's valid period. As a result, the university reported him to the Home Office. Subsequently, deportation proceedings were initiated.

== Students' Union ==
The University of Law Students' Union was set up with the aims of advancing the education, and student experience of ULaw students. It represents the interests of ULaw students and acts as a channel of communication in dealing with ULaw and other bodies, and to promote, encourage and co-ordinate student societies, sports and social activities. The Students' Union offers free, independent advice to students on a range of enquiries including complaints, appeals, disciplinaries and concessions. It conducts elections every year for its elected representative roles which include a vice-president for every campus It also holds yearly elections for its two full-time co-president Sabbatical Officer roles.

== Notable alumni and staff ==
Notable alumni and staff of the University of Law and the College of Law include:

- Eniola Aluko, British-Nigerian football executive
- Steve Barclay, Conservative Member of Parliament for North East Cambridgeshire and former Secretary of State for Exiting the European Union
- Jacqueline Bhabha, Professor at Harvard School of Public Health and Lecturer in Law at Harvard Law School
- Cherie Blair, CBE QC, barrister
- Hazel Blears, former Labour Member of Parliament for Salford and Eccles
- John Davies, Archbishop of Wales
- Andrew Dismore, former UK Labour Member of Parliament for Hendon
- Maria Eagle, Labour Member of Parliament for Garston and Halewood
- Charles Falconer, Baron Falconer of Thoroton, PC, QC, former Lord High Chancellor of Great Britain
- David Gauke, Conservative Member of Parliament for South West Hertfordshire, former Secretary of State for Justice and Lord Chancellor 2018-19
- Margaret Fiedler McGinnis, American musician
- Edward Garnier QC, former UK Conservative Member of Parliament for Harborough and Solicitor General for England and Wales
- Cheryl Gillan, UK Conservative Member of Parliament for Chesham and Amersham
- Thorrun Govind, pharmacist and solicitor
- Princess Badiya bint Hassan
- Sylvia Hermon, UK Member of Parliament for North Down
- Marcia Hutchinson, politician and author
- Robert Jenrick, Conservative politician and Minister of State for Immigration
- Rachel Joyce (triathlete)
- Seema Kennedy, Conservative politician
- Sadiq Khan, Mayor of London, and former UK Minister of Transport and Community
- Greg Knight, politician and author
- Jessica Lee, former UK Conservative Member of Parliament for Erewash in Derbyshire
- Geoffrey Ma, Chief Justice of the Hong Kong Court of Final Appeal
- Julian Malins, barrister
- Bryan Ian Le Marquand, Minister for Home Affairs for States of Jersey and former magistrate
- Francis Maude, UK Conservative, Member of Parliament for Horsham
- Gillian McAllister, author
- Atupele Muluzi, Malawian Member of Parliament
- Denise Nurse, entrepreneur, lawyer and television presenter
- Stephen O'Brien, former UK Conservative Member of Parliament for Eddisbury and diplomat
- Fiona Onasanya, former UK Labour Member of Parliament for Peterborough
- Mark Reckless, former UK Member of Parliament for Rochester and Strood
- Joshua Rozenberg, British legal commentator and journalist
- Guy Stair Sainty, author on royal genealogy and heraldry
- Jonny Searle, British Olympic rower
- John Varley, former CEO of Barclays
- Anurag Singh, professional cricketer and solicitor
- Jasvir Singh (barrister), regular contributor of Thought for the Day and co-founder of South Asian Heritage Month
- Robin Tilbrook, solicitor and political leader
- Keith Vaz, former Member of Parliament for Leicester East
- Claire Ward, UK Labour Member of Parliament for Watford (1997 to 2010)
- Sayeeda Warsi, Baroness Warsi, former Co-chairman of the Conservative Party
- James Wharton (politician)
- John Widgery, Baron Widgery, Kt OBE TD PC QC, judge and former Lord Chief Justice of England and Wales
