= Christleton =

Village in Cheshire, England

Coordinates: 53.185°N 2.838°W

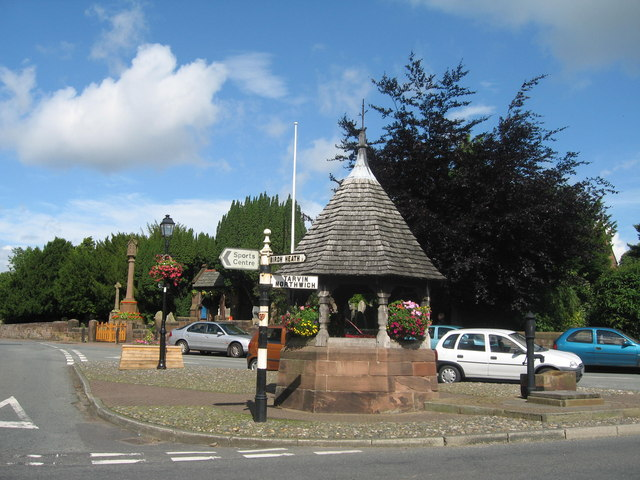
- The pumphouse in the centre of the village

- Location within Cheshire
- Population: 2,053 (2011 census)
- OS grid reference: SJ440657
- Civil parish: Christleton
- Unitary authority: Cheshire West and Chester
- Ceremonial county: Cheshire
- Region: North West
- Country: England
- Sovereign state: United Kingdom
- Post town: CHESTER
- Postcode district: CH3
- Dialling code: 01244
- Police: Cheshire
- Fire: Cheshire
- Ambulance: North West
- UK Parliament: Chester South and Eddisbury

Christleton is a village and civil parish on the outskirts of Chester, in the unitary authority of Cheshire West and Chester and the ceremonial county of Cheshire, England. The Shropshire Union Canal (originally Chester Canal) passes through the village.

The 2001 census recorded a population for the entire civil parish of 2,112, reducing to 2,053 in the 2011 census.

Christleton was named "one of the best places to live" in Cheshire and the North West by The Sunday Times in 2022 and again in 2024.

== History ==
The likely meaning of the name Christleton is "Christians' farm or settlement", derived from the Old English cristen (a Christian) - tūn (a settlement, enclosure or farmstead).

Its history can be traced with certainty to the Domesday Book, which contains an entry for Christetone, though there is evidence of earlier occupation. By 1086, the land was under the ownership of Robert FitzHugh (son of Hugh Lupus) and comprised 23 households: twelve villagers, five smallholders, two female slaves (maidservants), two "reeves" (officials) and two "radmen" (riders or roadmen).

During the English Civil War it was a Royalist outpost.

== Governance ==
Christleton is part of the Chester South and Eddisbury parliamentary constituency. The unitary authority of Cheshire West and Chester replaced Chester City Council and Cheshire County Council on 1 April 2009. The village is within the electoral ward of Christleton and Huntington.

Christleton is represented locally by its own parish council.

== Landmarks ==
Christleton Old Hall dates from the early 17th century and is a former country house and rectory. It was built for a member of the Egerton family of Tatton Park. In 1952 it was designated a Grade II* listed building.

Christleton Hall was built circa 1750. It is another former country house that has also been used as a boarding school and a college campus. Part of the building has Grade II listed status.

== Religion ==
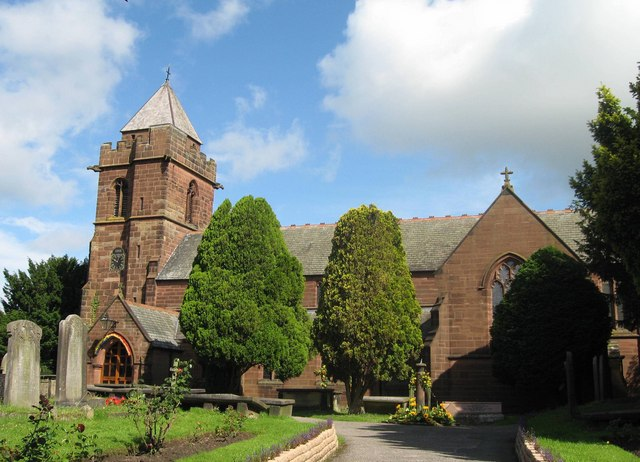
St James' Church

The Anglican church is dedicated to St James and the current building was designed by William Butterfield and was consecrated in 1877. The church's continuous list of clergy dates back to 1215. The village also has a Methodist church.

== Education ==
Secondary education is provided by Christleton High School, a large academy school that also caters for other suburban areas of Chester. Christleton also has a primary school.

A branch of The College of Law was based in Christleton Hall until 2021.

== Community ==
The village's amenities include a sports centre and swimming pool, a newsagent shop, parish hall and local pubs the Ring O Bells, the Cheshire Cat and The Plough. There is also a large pond situated by the village widely known as "Christleton Pit", which attracts children from the village and surrounding areas due to the abundance of wildlife.

It has been the best kept village in Cheshire in 2001, 2002, 2003 and 2004.

Christleton FC play in West Cheshire League.

== Notable people ==
- Lt. Colonel John Dolphin, born in Christleton in 1 October 1905.
- Billy Matthews (1882–1921), former Wales international footballer, lived latterly in Christleton and is buried in the churchyard under a CWGC headstone as Shoeing Smith William Mathews, Royal Field Artillery.

== See also ==
- Listed buildings in Christleton
