= Gibson and Weldon =

British law practice

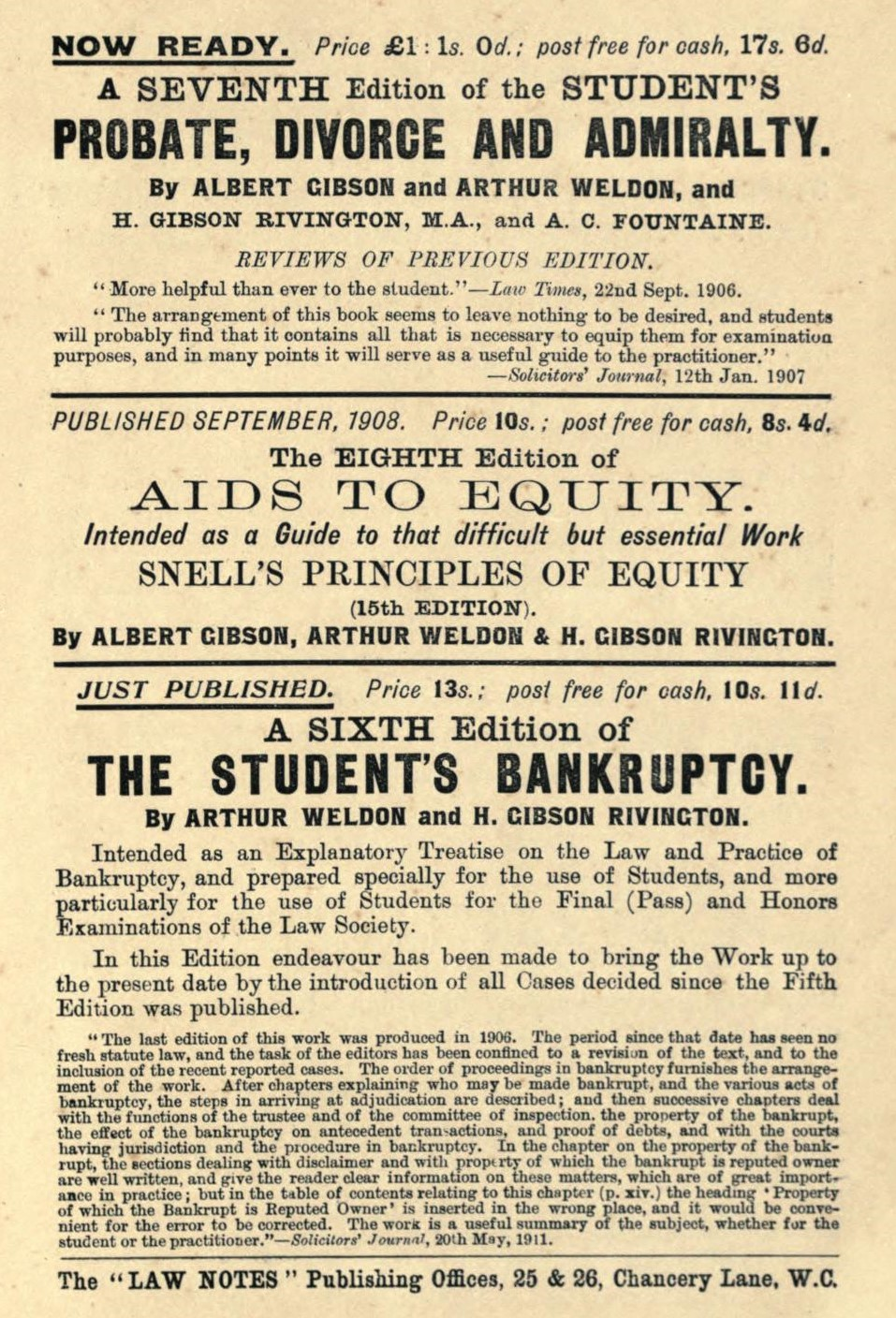
1911 advertisement for three of Gibson and Weldon's law books

Gibson and Weldon was a law practice at 27 Chancery Lane in London and the name of its tutorial firm which from 1876 until 1962 prepared hundreds of thousands of future solicitors and barristers in England and Wales for their examinations. Gibson and Weldon also published the monthly journal Law Notes and a series of legal textbooks from adjacent offices at 25–26 Chancery Lane. The firm's principals were Albert Gibson (1852–1921) and Arthur William Weldon (1856–1943). After the death of Arthur Weldon the tutorial firm continued until 1962 when it was merged with the Law Society's own law school to form the College of Law (since 2013 known as the University of Law).

== History ==
The latter part of the 19th century saw the introduction of formal examinations for entry into the legal profession. From 1862 solicitors were required to pass the Intermediate and Preliminary Examinations set by the Law Society, and later a prestigious Honours Examination was introduced. Compulsory written examinations for barristers were introduced in 1872. The university law schools concentrated on the principles, as opposed to the practice, of the law and found it increasingly difficult to sustain courses which could provide the practical knowledge required to pass the examinations. The Council of Legal Education, established by the Inns of Court in 1852, had the same problem. This in turn led to the rise of specialist tutorial firms which legal historian Patricia Leighton has termed "the first professional law teachers." The firms were largely established and run by practicing attorneys in London. The tension arising in the profession between the systems followed by the university law schools and those of the tutorial firms had sometimes led them to be dismissed as "crammers". It was a tension reflected in Gibson and Weldon's own 1905 advertisement stating that their "system of student preparation is as far as possible that of a Law School and all idea of preparing students on a 'cram' system is disregarded." (Note: In 1929, while still an undergraduate at Cambridge, Mohammad Hidayatullah, the future Chief Justice of India, applied to Gibson and Weldon to prepare him for the barrister examination in six weeks. The firm refused, writing to him "we do not work miracles.") Over 60 years after the firm's founding, the British jurist R. M. Jackson wrote in The Machinery of Justice in England:

I was in my time a pupil of Gibson and Weldon and I received better training from Mr. Weldon than I ever had in Cambridge, and by that I do not mean just the know-how to pass examinations but a real insight into the ways of lawyers and the courts.

Gibson and Weldon began in 1876 when Albert Gibson who had qualified as a solicitor in the Easter 1874 Honours examination began advertising for pupils who needed coaching for the Law Society examinations. In 1881, he was joined by the newly qualified Arthur Weldon who had been one of his first pupils. By the end of the 19th century, Gibson and Weldon, along with Indermaur and Thwaites, (Note: The principals of Indermaur and Thwaites were John Indermaur (1852–1925) and Charles Thwaites who qualified as a solicitor in 1880, six years after Indermaur. Their firm was located at 22 Chancery Lane.) dominated the law tutorial market in the UK. The two firms also dominated the law publishing market. January 1882 saw the first edition of Gibson's Law Notes, a monthly magazine for law students which originally published model answers and study advice for the Law Society examinations and other articles of interest to the legal profession. In 1885 it became simply Law Notes and remained in publication until the mid-1990s, long after Gibson and Weldon had ceased existence as a tutorial firm. Gibson and Weldon also published guides to the profession such as How to Become a Barrister and How to Become a Solicitor and numerous student-centered text books which were frequently updated in multiple editions. Their text book on conveyancing, first published in 1888 ran to 21 editions, the last of which was published in 1980.

For a time Edward Power Bilbrough was a partner in their practice at 27 Chancery Lane and also co-authored a textbook on the Companies Act 1900 (63 & 64 Vict. c. 48) with Gibson and Weldon. (Note: Edward Power Bilbrough later married Mary Lewis, an actress and the sister of Lewis Waller.) However, he left to form his own practice in 1901, and Gibson, Weldon and Bilbrough once again became Gibson and Weldon. Over the years, several other lawyers joined the firm as tutors and as authors of their teaching materials. These included Gibson's godson Henry Gibson Rivington (1872–1954), Arthur Clifford Fountaine (1875–1931) and Hermon Joseph Bond Cockshutt (1907–1970). In addition to their taught courses, which normally consisted of three months of intensive teaching, Gibson and Weldon also ran correspondence courses for articled clerks working outside London or unable to take time off work to attend in person. Lord Hailsham studied for all his examinations in the early 1930s via their correspondence courses.

In 1931, ten years after the death of Albert Gibson, the firm was incorporated as a limited liability company, Gibson and Weldon (Law Tutors) Ltd. (Note: Despite its merger into the College of Law in 1962, Gibson and Weldon (Law Tutors) Ltd. was not formally dissolved until 2013.) In 1961 the company was acquired by the Law Society, whose own law school was one of their competitors. The following year, the society merged the two schools into the College of Law with branches in London and Guildford. Hermon Cockshutt, an expert on tax law and the senior partner in Gibson and Weldon after the death of Arthur Weldon in 1943, had been instrumental in the negotiations leading to the firm's acquisition by the Law Society. He became the Deputy Chairman of the Board of the newly formed college. John Widgery, the future Lord Chief Justice of England and Wales, was another of Gibson and Weldon's tutors who continued teaching at the newly formed college. Richard Antony Donell (1923–2006), the last of the former partners of Gibson and Weldon on the staff of the College of Law, retired in 1988. Donell had prepared and updated the 21st and final edition of Gibson's Conveyancing.

== Former pupils ==
Former pupils of Gibson and Weldon include:

- Robin Day (1923–2000), British political broadcaster and former barrister
- David de Caires (1937–2008), Guyanese solicitor; founder and Editor-in-Chief of Stabroek News.
- Robin Dunn (1918–2014), High Court of Justice and Lord Justice of Appeal from 1980 to 1984
- William R. P. George (1912-2006), Welsh solicitor and poet
- Quintin Hogg, Lord Hailsham (1907–2001), Lord High Chancellor of Great Britain from 1979 to 1987
- R. M. Jackson (1903–1986), British jurist and legal scholar
- Seretse Khama (1921–1980), the first president of Botswana
- Idris Legbo Kutigi (1939–), Chief Justice of Nigeria from 2007 to 2009
- Robert Megarry (1910–2006), Vice-Chancellor of the Supreme Court from 1982 to 1985
- Ronald Waterhouse (1926–2011), High Court of Justice from 1978 to 1996
- Stephen Yong Kuet Tze (1921–2001), Malaysian politician; Secretary-General of the Sarawak United Peoples' Party from 1959 to 1982.
