= Nelly Diener =

Swiss flight attendant

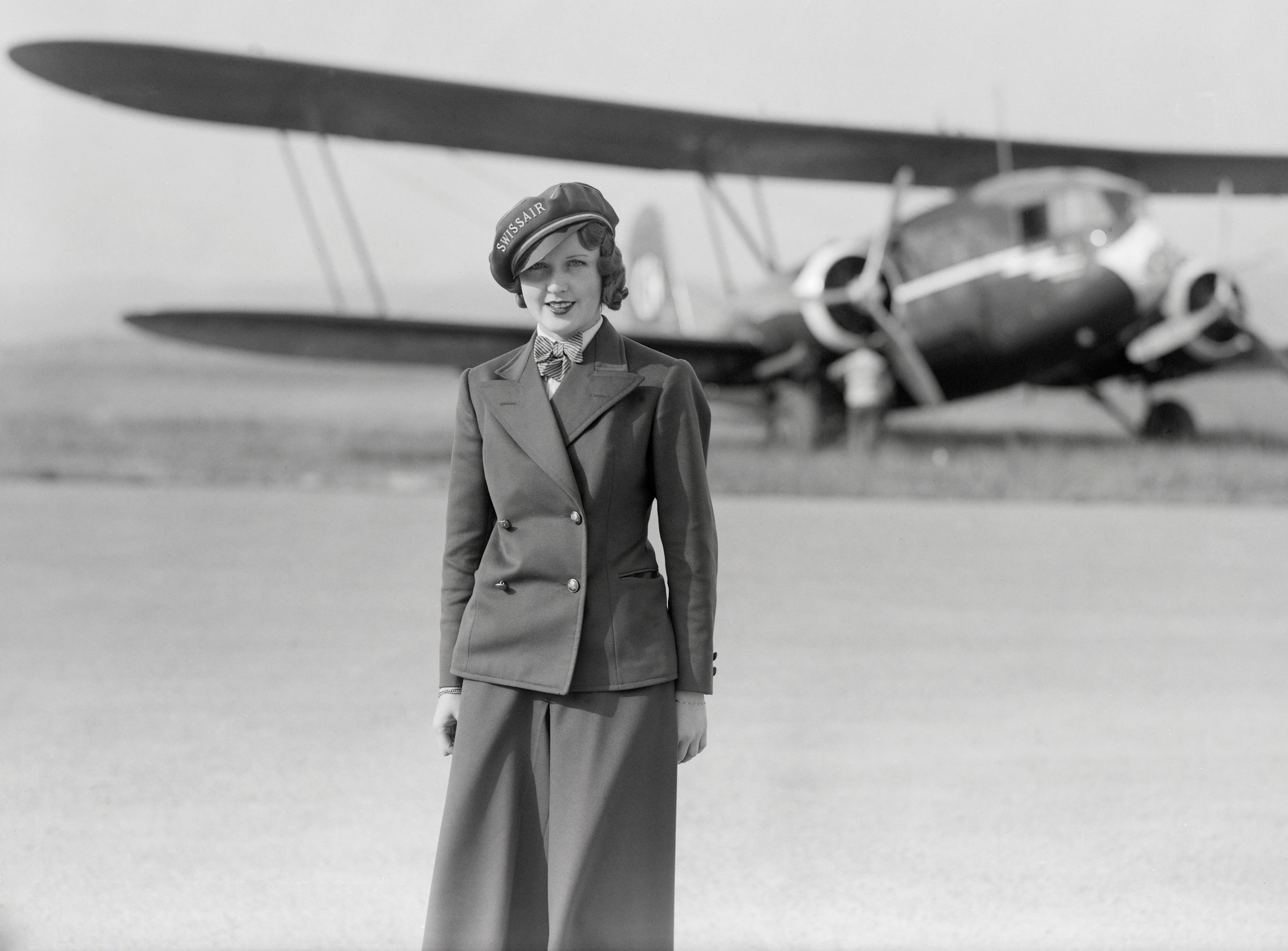
- Diener in front of the Curtis AT-32C Condor
- Born: 5 February 1912
- Died: 27 July 1934 (aged 22); Near Tuttlingen, Germany
- Cause of death: Airplane crash
- Other name: Engel der Lüfte ("Angel of the Skies" in English)
- Occupation: Flight attendant
- Years active: 1934
- Employer: Swissair
- Known for: Being Europe's first female flight attendant

Nelly Hedwig Diener (5 February 1912 – 27 July 1934) was a Swiss flight attendant. She was the first female flight attendant in Europe.

Diener started flying for Swissair on 1 May 1934 and became known as the Engel der Lüfte ("Angel of the Skies"). She died in the 1934 Swissair Tuttlingen accident, along with the other two crew members and nine passengers.

== See also ==
- Heinrich Kubis, the first flight attendant of either gender
- Ellen Church, the first female flight attendant
