= 1934 Swissair Tuttlingen accident =

1934 aviation accident

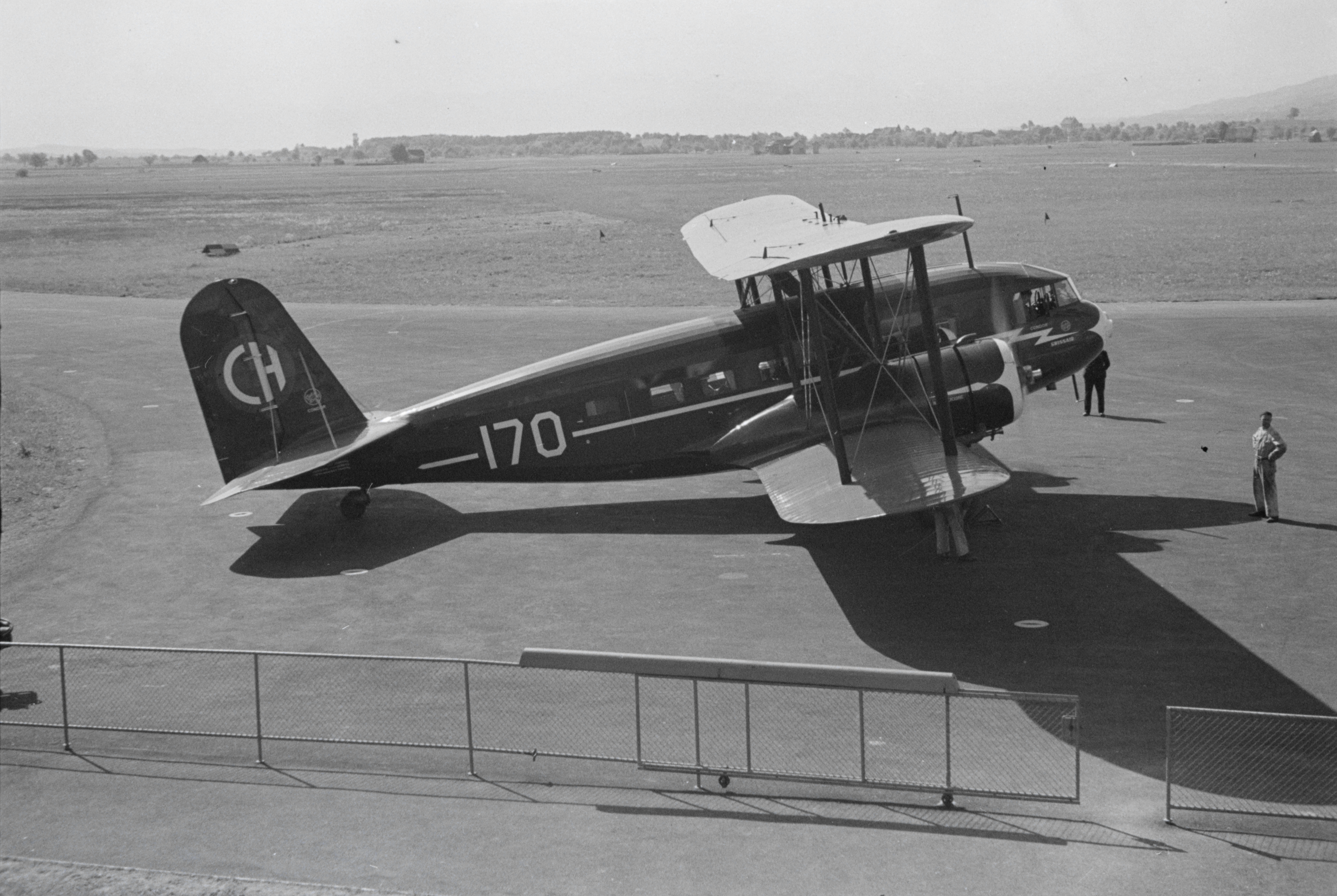
- CH-170, the aircraft involved in the accident, at Zurich's Dübendorf airport earlier in 1934

Accident
- Date: 27 July 1934
- Summary: In-flight wing separation in severe weather conditions
- Site: Near Tuttlingen, Nazi Germany; 48°01′07.1″N 08°47′47.3″E

Aircraft
- Aircraft type: Curtiss AT-32C Condor II
- Operator: Swissair
- Registration: CH-170
- Flight origin: Zurich Airport, Switzerland
- Stopover: Stuttgart Airport, Nazi Germany
- Last stopover: Leipzig/Halle Airport, Nazi Germany
- Destination: Berlin Tempelhof Airport, Nazi Germany
- Passengers: 9
- Crew: 3
- Fatalities: 12
- Survivors: 0

On 27 July 1934, a Swissair Curtiss AT-32C Condor II passenger aircraft crashed near Tuttlingen, Nazi Germany, while flying through a thunderstorm. All 12 people on board were killed. It was the worst air crash in 1934 and Swissair's first aviation accident since its founding in 1931.

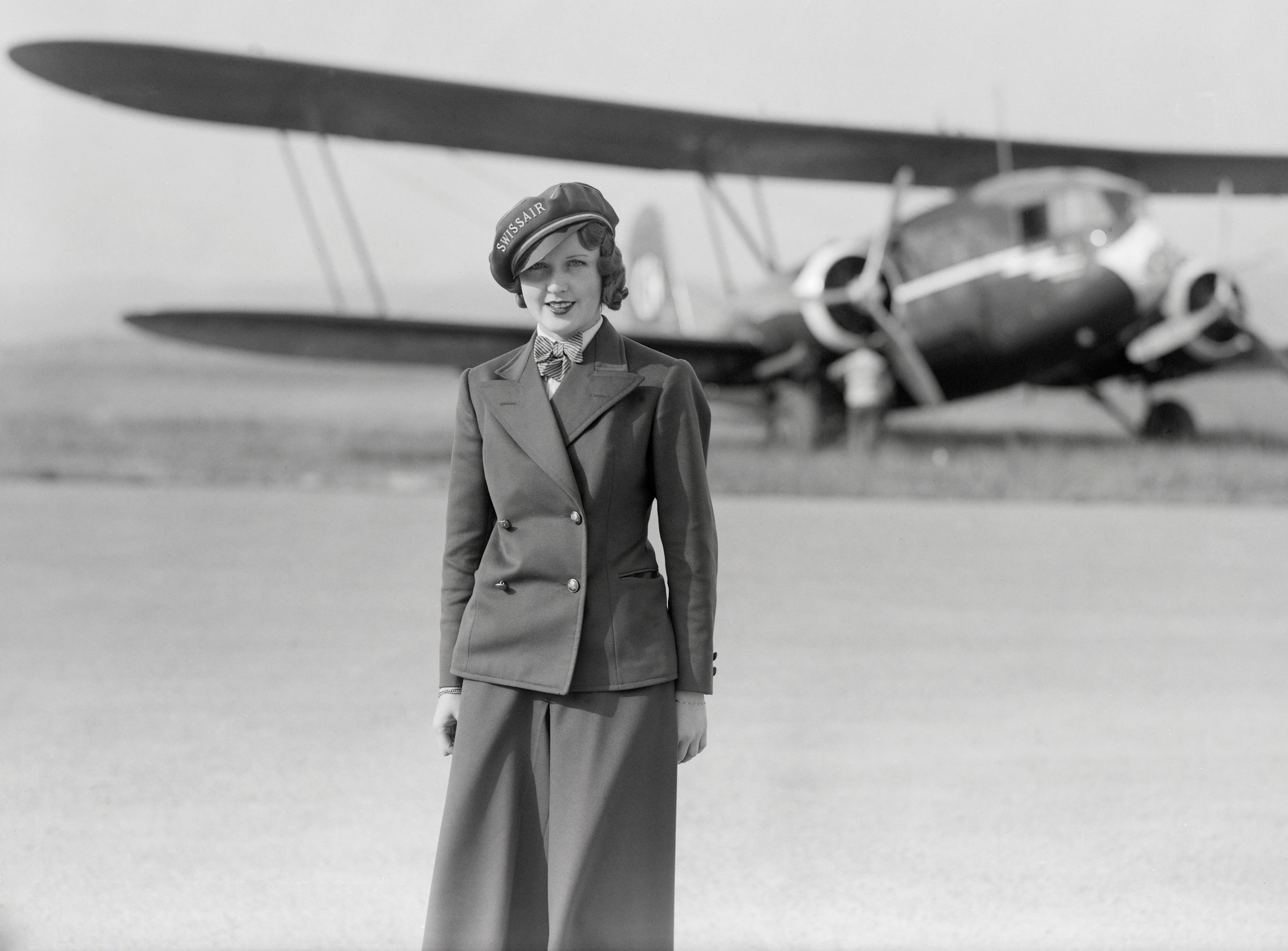
The accident aircraft in the background, behind Nelly Diener, who died in the crash

== Aircraft and occupants ==
The aircraft involved in the accident, registered CH-170, was a Curtiss AT-32C Condor II, a variant of the standard T-32 developed specifically for Swiss flag carrier Swissair, which was its only operator. CH-170 had entered service on 28 March 1934, and at the time of the accident, had only been in service for four months. The cabin was configured with seating for up to 15 people.

The aircraft's flight attendant, Nelly Diener, also known as the Engel der Lüfte ("Angel of the Skies"), was Europe's first air stewardess. She had been working for Swissair since 1 May 1934. The other two crew members were the pilot, Armin Mühlematter, and the radio navigator, Hans Daschinger. On the fatal flight, nine passengers were aboard.

== Accident ==
The aircraft departed Zurich for Berlin, with stopovers in Stuttgart and Leipzig. Shortly after crossing the Swiss-German border, the aircraft, cruising at an altitude around 3,000 m (9,800 ft), encountered a thunderstorm, and while flying through it, experienced turbulence. The right wing eventually broke off; the plane fell into a forest near Tuttlingen, exploding into flames on impact.

== Investigation ==
Investigators found that oscillations in the wing had caused a stress fracture, the severity of which was exacerbated by the violent weather conditions in which the aircraft was flying. German investigators, however, determined that one fracture formed in the wing and engine-mount structure due to defective construction and welding techniques in conjunction with the engine vibrations, while a second fracture resulted from the force of the turbulence in the storm.
