= Ellen Church =

American aviation pioneer (1904–1965)

- Born: September 22, 1904; Cresco, Iowa, U.S.
- Died: August 22, 1965 (aged 60); Terre Haute, Indiana, U.S.
- Education: Bachelor's degree of nursing education, University of Minnesota
- Occupations: Flight attendant Nurse
- Employer: Boeing Air Transport (Predecessor of United Airlines)
- Known for: First female flight attendant
- Awards: Air Medal; European-African-Middle Eastern Campaign Medal; American Campaign Medal; World War II Victory Medal

Ellen Church (September 22, 1904 – August 22, 1965) was the first female flight attendant. A trained nurse and pilot, Church wanted to pilot commercial aircraft, but those jobs were not open to women. Still wanting to fly, Church successfully worked to convince Boeing Air Transport that using nurses as flight-stewardesses would increase safety and help convince passengers that flying was safe. Their first flight took off on May 15, 1930.

== Biography ==
Church was born in Cresco, Iowa. After graduating from Cresco High School, Church studied nursing and worked in a San Francisco hospital. She was a pilot and a registered nurse. Steve Stimpson, the manager of the San Francisco office of Boeing Air Transport (BAT), would not hire her as a pilot, but did pass along her suggestion to put nurses on board airplanes to calm the public's fear of flying. In 1930, BAT hired Church as head stewardess, and she recruited seven others for a three-month trial period.

The stewardesses, or "sky girls" as BAT called them, had to be registered nurses, "single, younger than 25 years old; weigh less than 115 pounds [52 kg]; and stand less than 5 feet, 4 inches tall [1.63 m]". In addition to attending to the passengers, they were expected to, when necessary, help with hauling luggage, fueling and assisting pilots to push the aircraft into hangars. However, the salary was good: $125 a month.

Church became the first stewardess to fly (though not the first flight attendant, as German Heinrich Kubis had preceded her in 1912). On May 15, 1930, she embarked on a Boeing 80A for a 20-hour flight from Oakland/San Francisco to Chicago with 13 stops and 14 passengers. According to one source, the pilot was another aviation pioneer, Elrey Borge Jeppesen.

The innovation was a resounding success - the other airlines followed BAT's example over the next few years - but an injury from an automobile accident ended her career after 18 months.

She obtained a bachelor's degree in nursing education from the University of Minnesota and resumed nursing. In 1936, she became supervisor of pediatrics at Milwaukee County Hospital. During World War II, Church served in the Army Nurse Corps as a captain and flight nurse and earned an Air Medal. She moved to Terre Haute, Indiana, where she became director of nursing and later an administrator at Union Hospital.

In 1964, she married Leonard Briggs Marshall, president of the Terre Haute First National Bank. A horse riding accident ended her life in 1965.

== Legacy ==
Cresco's municipal airport was named Ellen Church Field (KCJJ) in her honor.

== See also ==
- Nelly Diener (1912–1934), the first female flight attendant in Europe
