= Hindenburg: The Untold Story =

2007 docudrama

Hindenburg: The Untold Story known in Germany as Das Geheimnis der Hindenburg ("The Secret of the Hindenburg") and Die Hindenburg: die ungeklärte Katastrophe, is a two-hour docudrama about the disaster of the Hindenburg, and the investigation that followed. It aired on May 6, 2007, to commemorate the 70th anniversary of the disaster. It was commissioned by Channel 4, ZDF, and the Smithsonian Networks to be produced by Pioneer Productions. Its original working title was Hindenburg It is also known as Hindenburg: Titanic of the skies (which should not be confused with Titanic of the Sky, a different documentary by Vidicom). The British version is narrated by Malcolm Tierney who plays the role of Hugo Eckener, while John Shrapnel narrates an alternative version which features interviews with survivors.

It provides a reenactment of the Hindenburg disaster using a detailed computer-animated model. The animation was done by Red Vision, which also did the animation for two previous documentaries on the Hindenburg disaster: Hindenburg Disaster: Probable Cause and an episode of Seconds From Disaster. The film mainly focuses on the official investigation of the disaster. The live actions scenes were shot in Poland and later edited by Red Vision.

== Story ==
The film primarily focuses on the Hindenburg's demise and the official inquiry that followed.

== Cast ==
- Narrator*: John Shrapnel (UK dub), Bill Roberts (US version)
- Dr. Hugo Eckener: Malcolm Tierney
- Commander Rosendahl: Mark McGann
- Jean Rosendahl: Lorelei King
- Max Pruss: Albert Welling
- Herbert Morrison: Gerard Monaco
- Joseph Späh: Simon Lowe
- Nelson Morris: Michael Praed
- Chief Steward Heinrich Kubis: Thorston Manderlay
- Werner Franz: Kamil Krawczykowski
- Helmut Lau: Piotr Grabowski
- Rudolph Sauter: John Edmondson
- Colonel South Trimble (Jr.): Phil Goss

== Filmmakers ==
- Director Sean Grundy
- Producer Vicky Matthews
- Editor Martin Swann
- Composer Andrew Hewitt
- Cinematographer David Langan
