= Albert Welling =

British actor (born 1952)

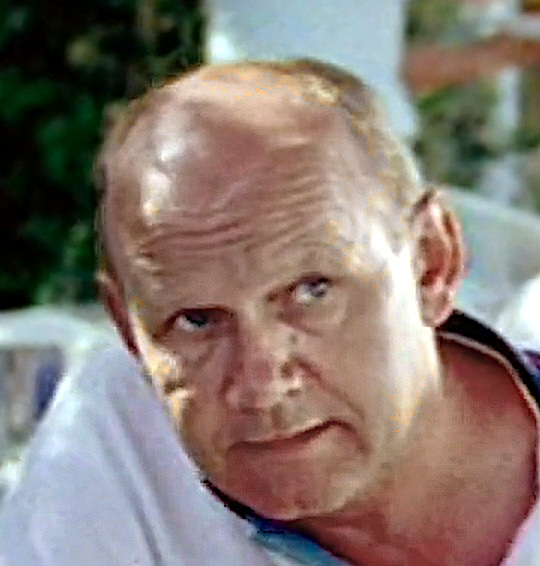
- Welling in Carla 2003
- Born: Albert Edward Welling; 29 February 1952 (age 74); London, England
- Occupation: Actor
- Years active: 1976–present

Albert Welling (born 29 February 1952) is a British actor. He has appeared in a number of television series including The Line of Beauty, Cribb, Z-Cars, The Sweeney, Rumpole of the Bailey, The Bretts, Inspector Morse and A Touch of Frost.

== Career ==
He made his stage debut in Zigger Zagger in 1967 with the National Youth Theatre. In 1979 he played Keith Everly, a recurring character, in the BBC drama series Telford's Change.

His film credits include Backbeat, Ricky Gervais and Stephen Merchant's directorial debut Cemetery Junction and Wilde. He portrayed Adolf Hitler in an episode of Doctor Who entitled "Let's Kill Hitler", and later was cast as Winston Churchill in the Netflix series Kennedy. He played Max Pruss, in the documentary Hindenburg: The Untold Story.

In 2013, Welling wrote and starred in the play No Direction alongside Ronnie Toms; the play was premièred at the Edinburgh Festival. No Direction was directed by Bob Golding and ran for the duration of the festival at Assembly Three, George Square.

== Filmography ==
=== Film ===
Year	Title	Role	Notes
2005	Mangal Pandey: The Rising	Lord Charles Canning	
2019	The Good Liar	German Industrialist	
2021	Mothering Sunday	Mr. Paxton	

=== Television ===
Year	Title	Role	Notes
2006	Holby City	Dr. Klaus Hafner	Episode: "Moondance"
2007	Hindenburg: Titanic of the Skies	Captain Pruss	Television movie
2008	Midsomer Murders	Ron Wilson	Episode: "Left for Dead"
2011	Doctor Who	Adolf Hitler	Episode: "Let's Kill Hitler"
2017	Taboo	Count Musgrove	Episode: "#1.5"
2018	Outlander	Pastor Gottfried	Episode: "Savages"
2019	Traitors	Brigadier Moss	Episode: "Feef"
2019	Succession	Paul Dodds	Episode: "Return"
2019	Catherine the Great	German Ambassador	Episode: "#1.4"
2023	Stonehouse	Cliff Michelmore	Episode: #1.1"
2023	FBI: International	Simon Ballack	Episode: "Glimmers and Ghosts"
2024	Mr Bates vs The Post Office	Judge Harvey	Television miniseries

=== Video games ===
Year	Title	Role	Notes
2017	Lego Marvel Super Heroes 2	(voice)	
