= Flight attendant =

Position in an aircrew

- Austrian Airlines cabin crew

Occupation
- Synonyms: Air host/hostess; Steward/stewardess; Cabin crew
- Occupation type: Profession
- Activity sectors: Airlines; Business jets

A flight attendant is a member of the aircrew whose primary responsibility is to ensure the safety of passengers in the cabin of an aircraft across all stages of flight. Their secondary duty is to see to the comfort of passengers. Flight attendants are also known as a steward (masc) or stewardess (fem), or air host (masc) or air hostess (fem) and are collectively referred to as cabin crew.

== History ==
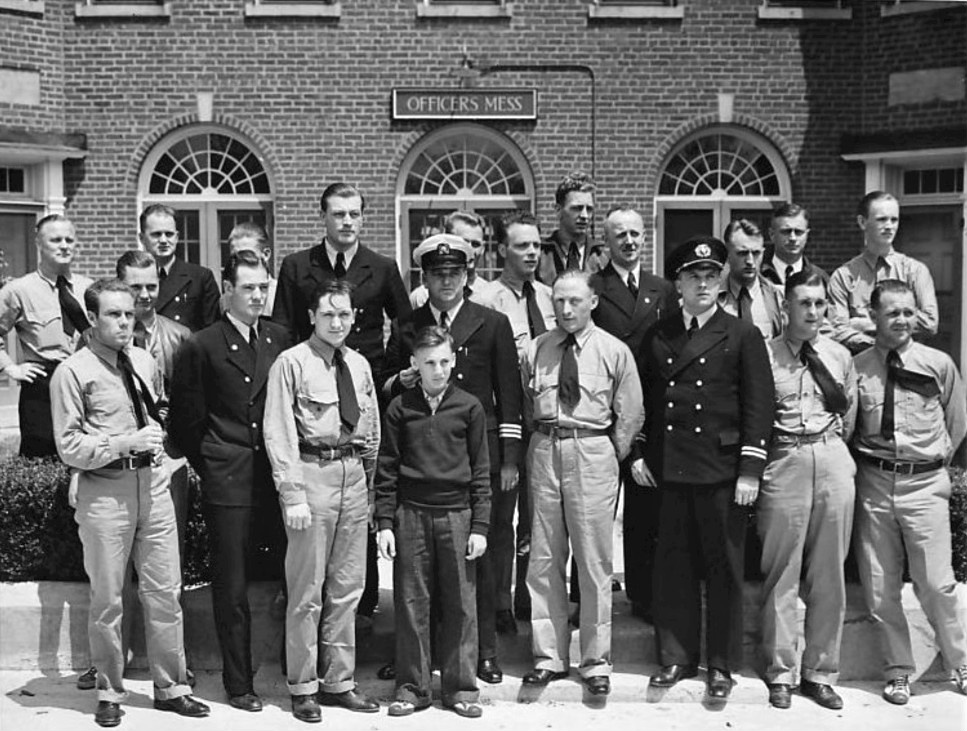
Heinrich Kubis (back row, fourth from right; photographed in 1937) was the world's first flight attendant, serving on a Zeppelin.

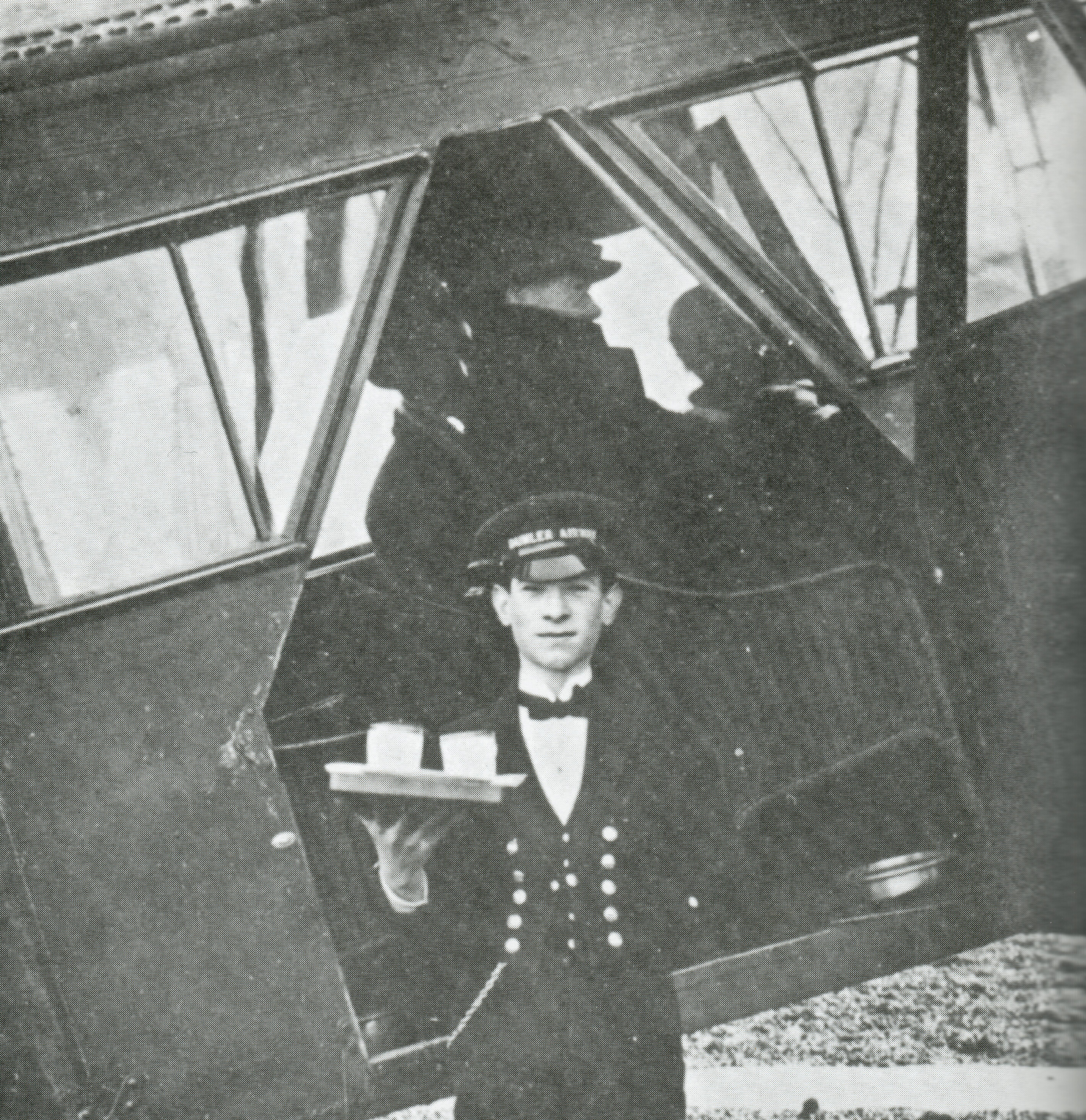
Jack Sanderson (1922/23) at age 14. He was the first airplane flight attendant in the world.

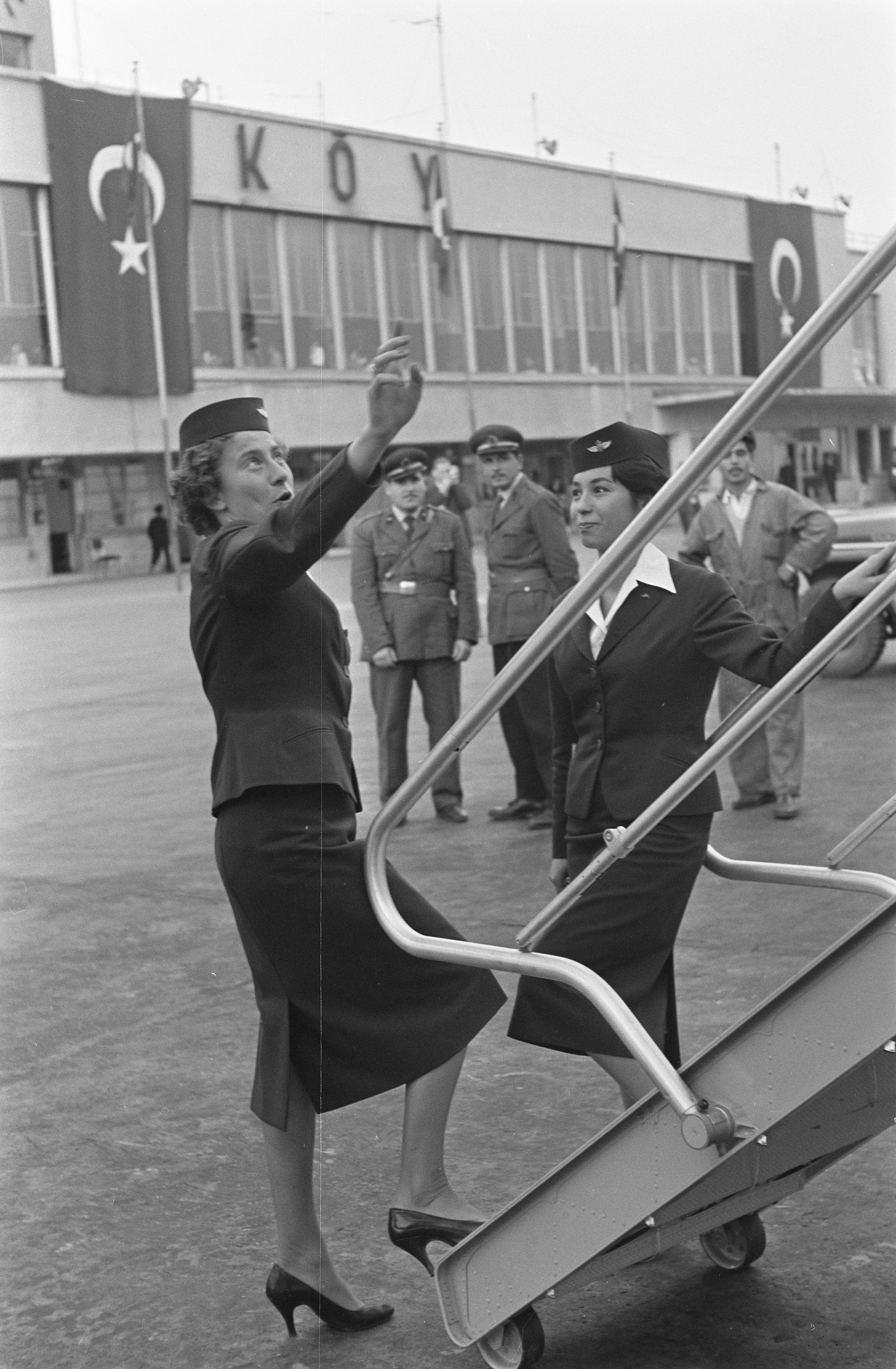
Dutch flight attendants, Istanbul, 1959

The role of a flight attendant derives from that of similar positions on passenger ships or passenger trains, but has more direct involvement with passengers because of the confined quarters on aircraft. Additionally, the job of a flight attendant revolves around safety to a much greater extent than those of similar staff on other forms of transportation. Flight attendants on board a flight collectively form a cabin crew, as distinguished from pilots and engineers in the cockpit.

The German Heinrich Kubis was the world's first flight attendant, in 1912 aboard a Zeppelin. Kubis first attended to the passengers on board the DELAG Zeppelin LZ 10 Schwaben. He also attended to the famous LZ 129 Hindenburg and was on board when it burst into flames. He survived by jumping out a window when it neared the ground.

The world's first flight attendant to serve on an airplane was the British Jack Sanderson, who was employed at the age of 14 by Daimler Airway in 1922; the airline later became part of British Airways.

Origins of the word "steward" in transportation are reflected in the term "chief steward" as used in maritime transport terminology. The term purser and chief steward are often used interchangeably describing personnel with similar duties among seafaring occupations. This lingual derivation results from the international British maritime tradition (i.e., chief mate) dating back to the 14th century and the civilian United States Merchant Marine on which U.S. aviation is somewhat modelled. Due to international law, conventions and agreements, in which all ships' personnel who sail internationally are similarly documented, see Merchant Mariner's Document, by their respective countries, the U.S. Merchant Marine assigns such duties to the chief steward in the overall rank and command structure of which pursers are not positionally represented or rostered.

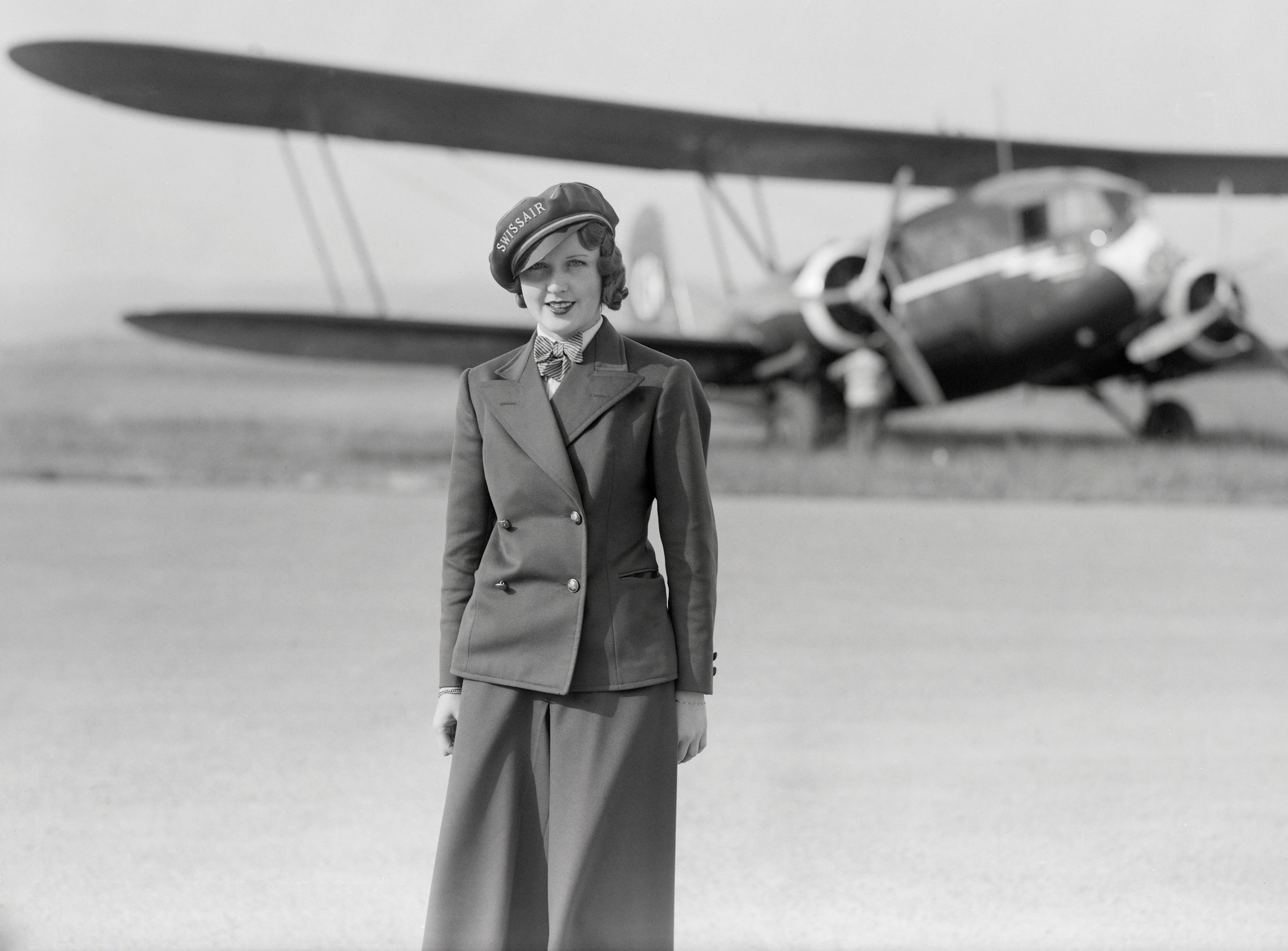
Nelly Diener, the first female flight attendant in Europe, hired in May 1934. She was killed on the plane pictured behind her, in the July 1934 Swissair Tuttlingen accident.

Imperial Airways of the United Kingdom had "cabin boys" or "stewards" in the 1920s. In the US, Stout Airways was the first to employ stewards in 1926, working on Ford Trimotor planes between Detroit and Grand Rapids, Michigan. Western Airlines (1928) and Pan American World Airways (Pan Am) (1929) were the first US carriers to employ stewards to serve food. Ten-passenger Fokker aircraft used in the Caribbean had stewards in the era of gambling trips to Havana, Cuba, from Key West, Florida. Lead flight attendants would in many instances also perform the role of purser, steward, or chief steward in modern aviation terminology.

The first female flight attendant was a 25-year-old registered nurse named Ellen Church. Hired by United Airlines in 1930, she also first envisioned nurses on aircraft. Other airlines followed suit, hiring nurses to serve as flight attendants, then called "stewardesses" or "air hostesses", on most of their flights. In the United States, the job was one of only a few in the 1930s to permit women, which, coupled with the Great Depression, led to large numbers of applicants for the few positions available. Two thousand women applied for just 43 positions offered by Transcontinental and Western Airlines in December 1935.

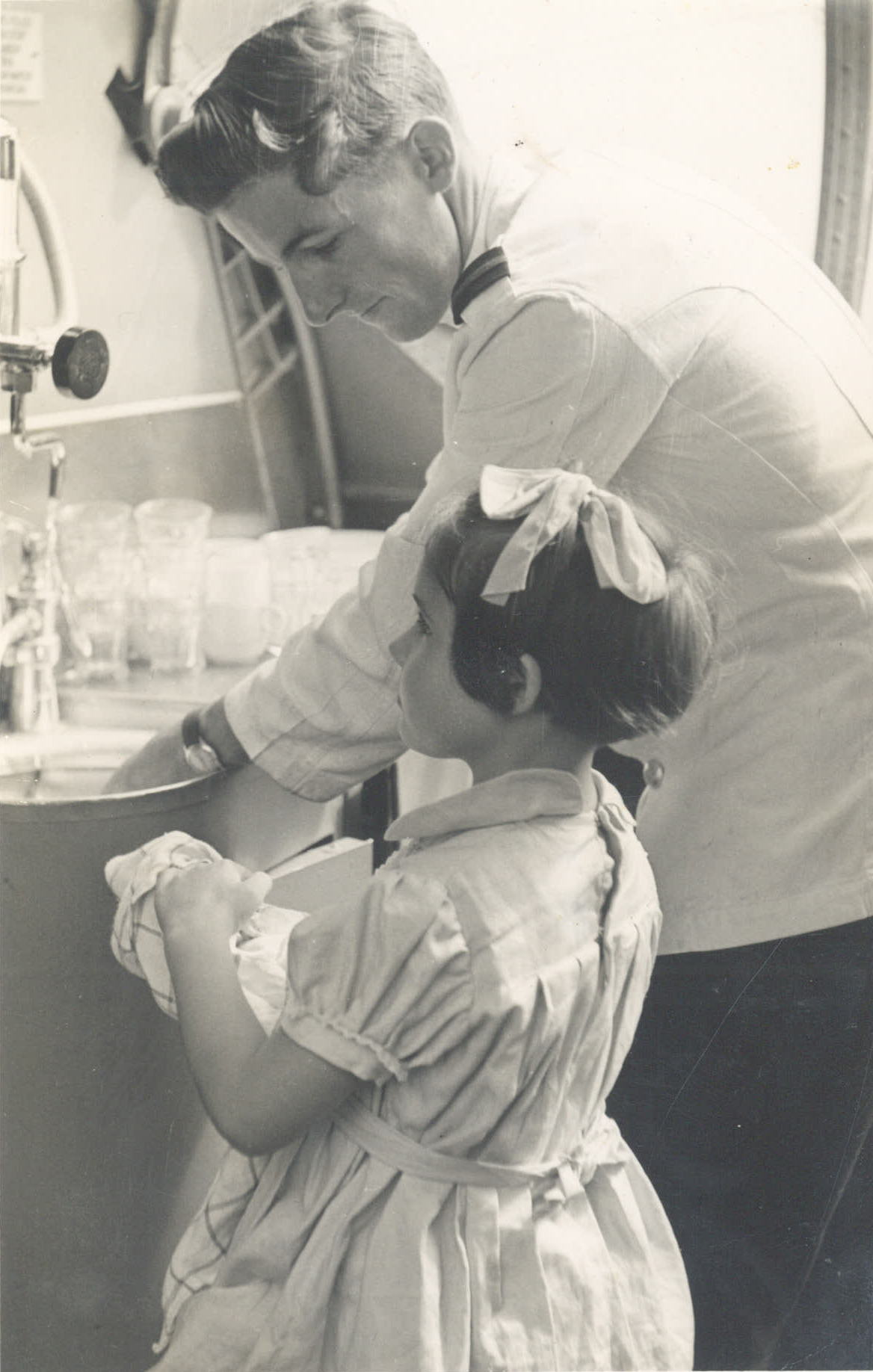
Washing dishes during a Qantas Airlines flight, 1949

Female flight attendants rapidly replaced male ones, and by 1936, they had all but taken over the role in America.

Air France recruited its first female flight attendants in 1946.

Female flight attendants in America were selected not only for their knowledge but also for their physical characteristics. A 1936 article in The New York Times described the requirements:

The girls who qualify for hostesses must be petite; weight 100 to 118 pounds; height 5 feet to 5 feet 4 inches; age 20 to 26 years. Add to that the rigid physical examination each must undergo four times every year, and you are assured of the bloom that goes with perfect health.

Three decades later, a 1966 New York Times classified ad for stewardesses at Eastern Airlines listed these requirements:

A high school graduate, single (widows and divorcees with no children considered), 20 years of age (girls 19 1/2 may apply for future consideration). 5'2" but no more than 5'9 weight 105 to 135 in proportion to height and have at least 20/40 vision without glasses.

Appearance was considered one of the most important factors to become a stewardess. At that time, airlines believed that the exploitation of female sexuality would increase their profits; thus the uniforms of female flight attendants were often formfitting, complete with white gloves and high heels.

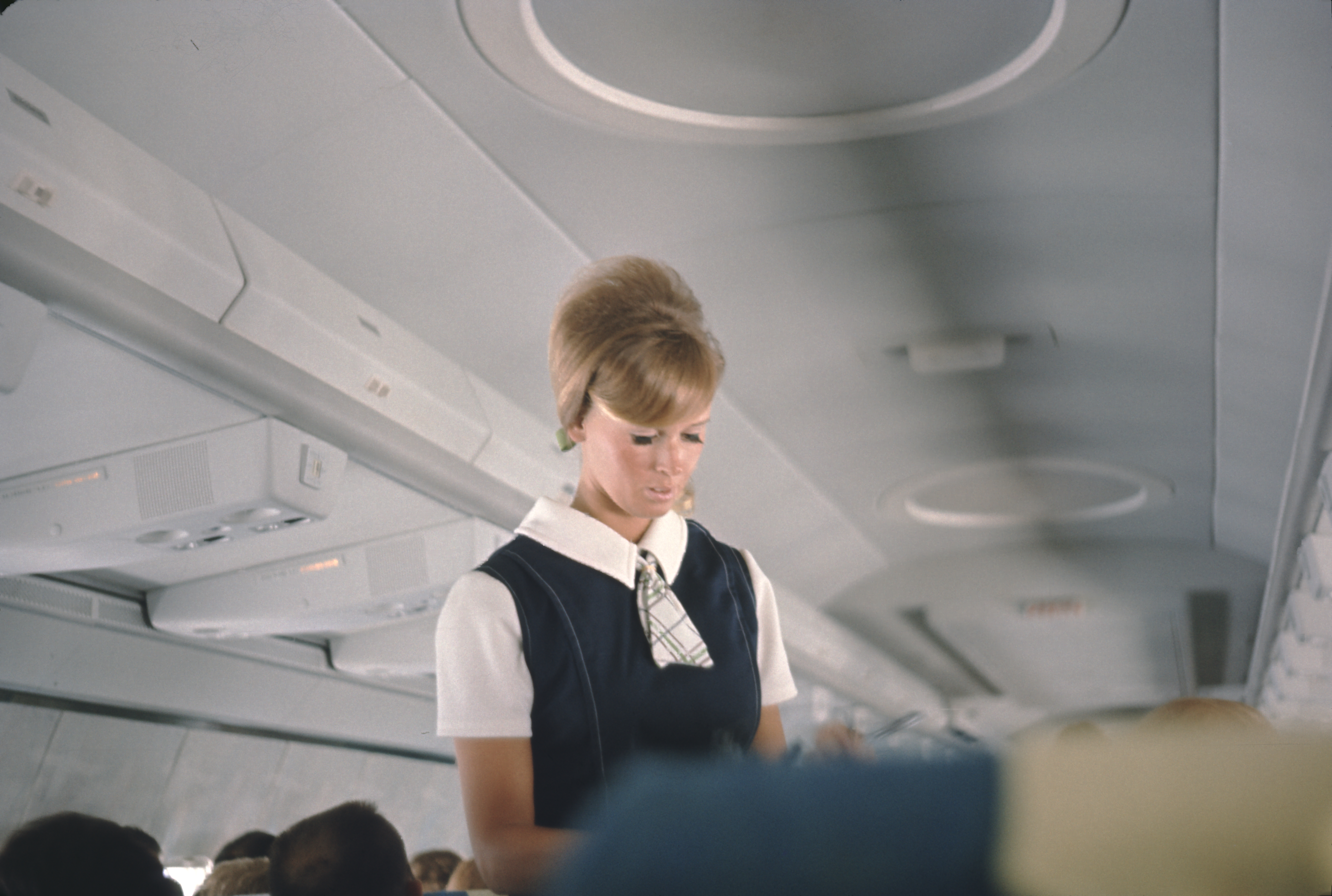
Flight attendant circa 1970

In the United States, they were required to be unmarried and were fired if they decided to marry. The requirement to be a registered nurse on an American airline was relaxed as more women were hired, and disappeared almost entirely during World War II as many nurses joined military nurse corps.

Ruth Carol Taylor was the first African-American flight attendant in the United States. Hired in December 1957, on 11 February 1958, Taylor was the flight attendant on a Mohawk Airlines flight from Ithaca to New York, the first time such a position had been held by an African American. She was let go within six months as a result of Mohawk's then-common marriage ban. Patricia Banks Edmiston became the first black flight attendant for Capitol Airlines in 1960 following a legal complaint which resulted in the airline being required to hire her.

The U.S. Equal Employment Opportunity Commission's (EEOC) first complainants were female flight attendants complaining of age discrimination, weight requirements, and bans on marriage. (Originally female flight attendants were fired if they reached age 32 or 35 depending on the airline, were fired if they exceeded weight regulations, and were required to be single upon hiring and fired if they got married.) In 1968, the EEOC declared age restrictions on flight attendants' employment to be illegal sex discrimination under Title VII of the Civil Rights Act of 1964. Also in 1968, the EEOC ruled that sex was not a bona fide occupational requirement to be a flight attendant. The restriction of hiring only women was lifted at all airlines in 1971 due to the decisive court case of Diaz v. Pan Am. The Airline Deregulation Act was passed in 1978, and the no-marriage rule was eliminated throughout the US airline industry by the 1980s. The last such broad categorical discrimination, the weight restrictions, were relaxed in the 1990s through litigation and negotiations. Airlines still often have vision and height requirements and may require flight attendants to pass a medical evaluation.

In Pakistan, during the Islamization policy of Muhammad Zia-ul-Haq from 1977 to 1988, all women employed by the federal government, including flight attendants, were mandated to veil themselves.

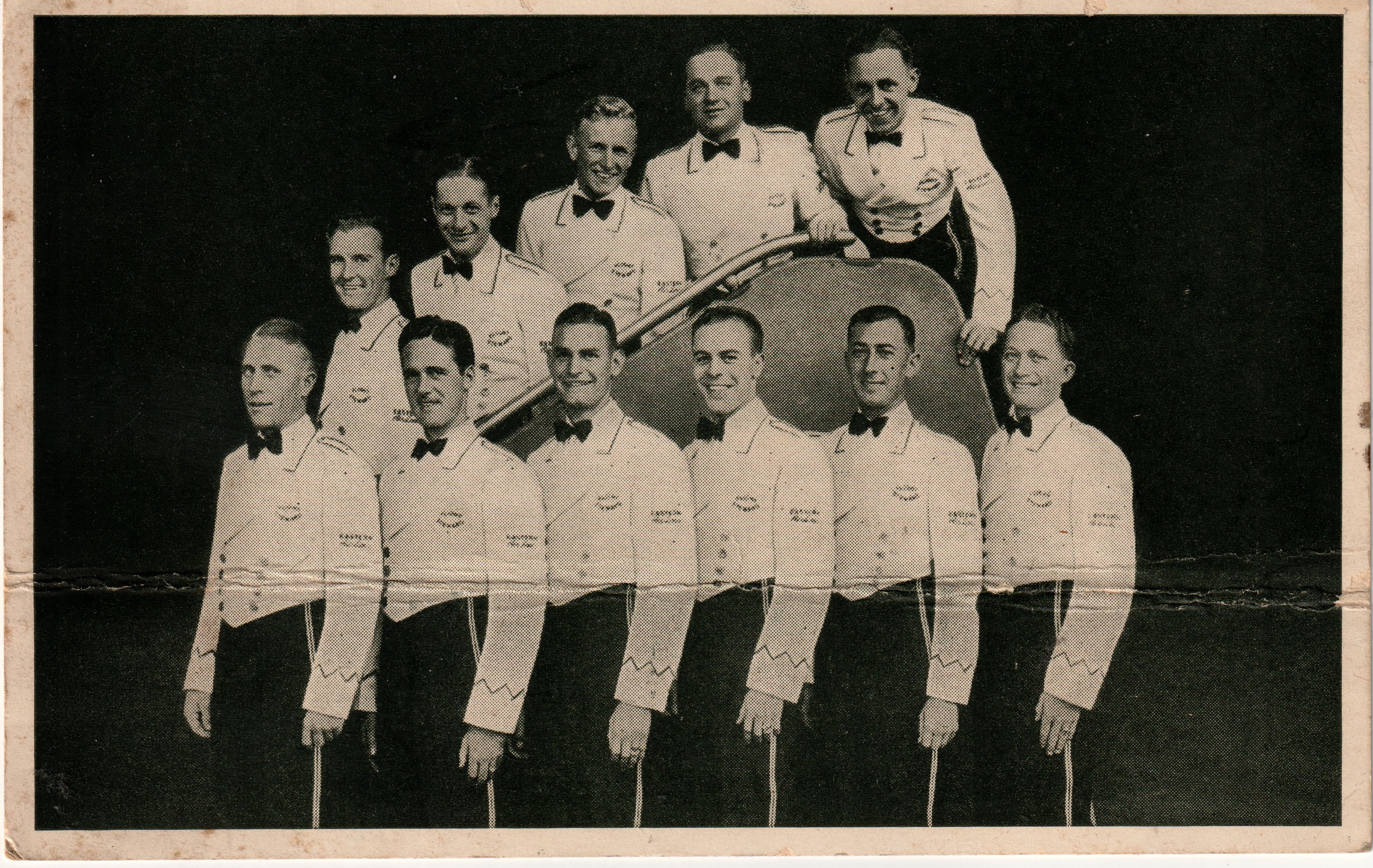
Flight crew of stewards for an Eastern Air Lines Silverliner, circa 1950s

== Overview ==
The role of a flight attendant is to "provide routine services and respond to emergencies to ensure the safety and comfort of airline passengers".

Typically flight attendants require holding a high school diploma or equivalent, and in the United States, the median annual wage for flight attendants was $50,500 in May 2017, higher than the median for all workers of $37,690.

The number of flight attendants required on flights is mandated by each country's regulations. In the U.S., for light planes with 19 or fewer seats, or, if weighing more than 7,500 lb (3,400 kg), 9 or fewer seats, no flight attendant is needed; on larger aircraft, one flight attendant per 50 passenger seats is required.

The majority of flight attendants for most airlines are female, though a substantial number of males have entered the industry since 1980.

=== Responsibilities ===
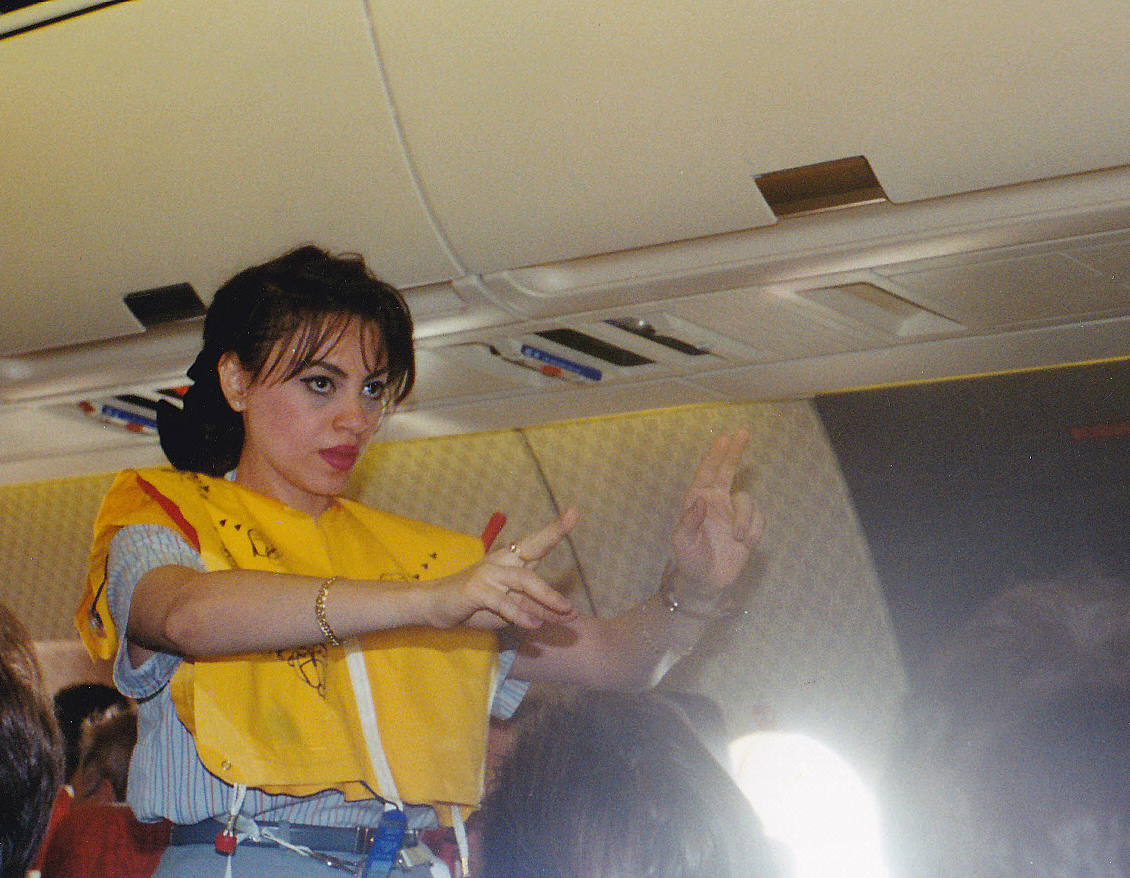
An EgyptAir flight attendant performing a pre-flight safety demonstration

Prior to each flight, flight attendants and pilots go over safety and emergency checklists, the locations of emergency equipment and other features specific to that aircraft type. Boarding particulars are verified, such as special needs passengers, small children travelling alone, or VIPs. Weather conditions are discussed including anticipated turbulence. A safety check is conducted to ensure equipment such as life-vests, torches (flash lights) and firefighting equipment are on board and in proper condition. They monitor the cabin for any unusual smells or situations. They assist with the loading of carry-on baggage, checking for weight, size and dangerous goods. They make sure those sitting in emergency exit rows are willing and able to assist in an evacuation. They then give a safety demonstration or monitor passengers as they watch a safety video. They then must "secure the cabin" ensuring tray tables are stowed, seats are in their upright positions, armrests down and carry-ons stowed correctly and seat belts are fastened prior to take-off.

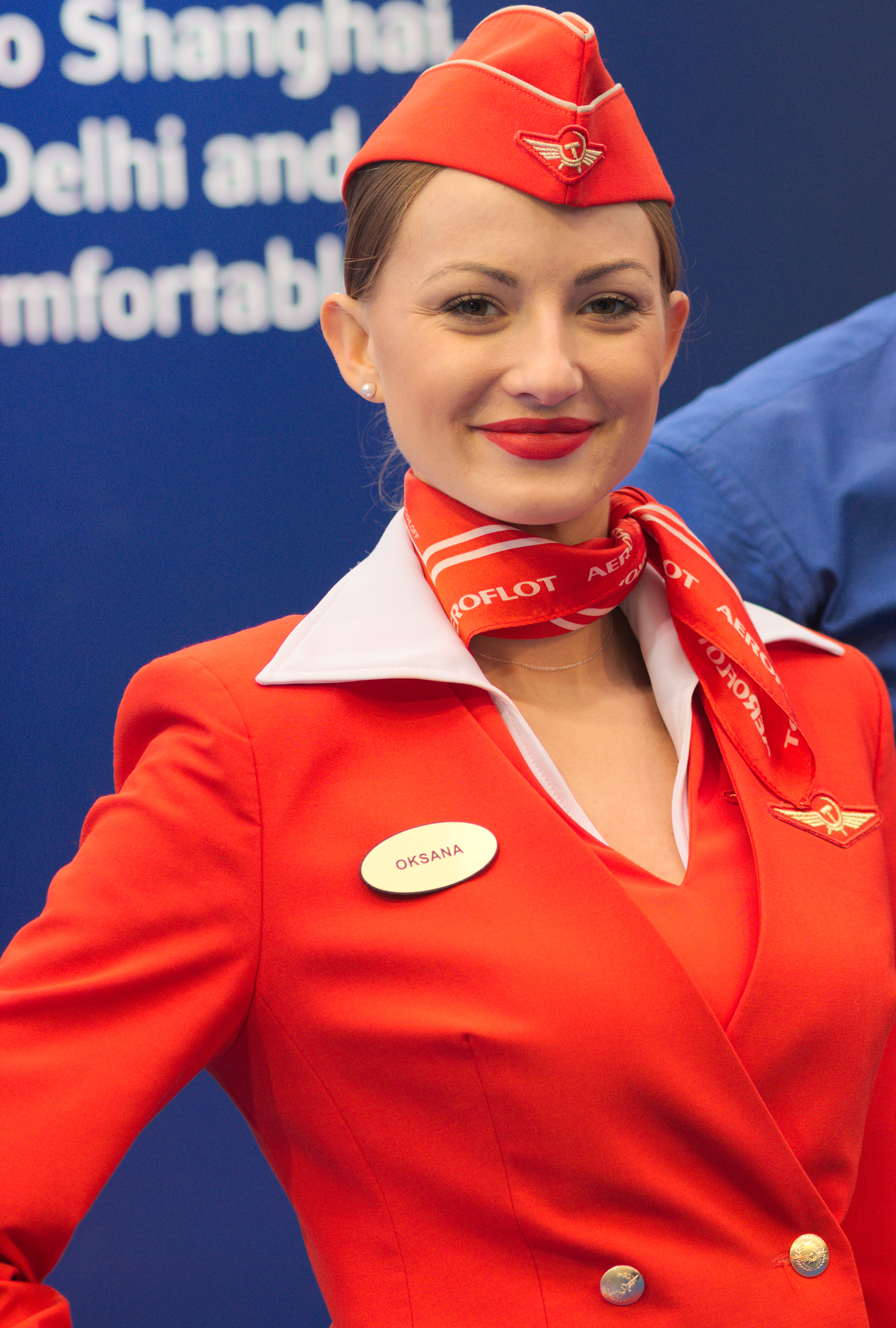
Aeroflot flight attendant, Belgrade (2017)

Once up in the air, flight attendants will usually serve drinks and/or food to passengers using an airline service trolley. The duty has led to the mildly derogatory slang term "trolley dolly". When not performing customer service duties, flight attendants must periodically conduct cabin checks and listen for any unusual noises or situations. Checks must also be done on the lavatory to ensure the smoke detector has not been disabled or destroyed and to restock supplies as needed. Regular cockpit checks must be done to ensure the health and safety of the pilot(s). They must also respond to call lights dealing with special requests. During turbulence, flight attendants must ensure the cabin is secure. Prior to landing, all loose items, trays and rubbish must be collected and secured along with service and galley equipment. All hot liquids must be disposed of. A final cabin check must then be completed prior to landing. Upon landing, flight attendants must remain stationed at exits and monitor the aircraft and cabin as passengers disembark the plane. They also assist any special needs passengers and small children off the aeroplane and escort children, while following the proper paperwork and ID process to escort them to the designated person picking them up.

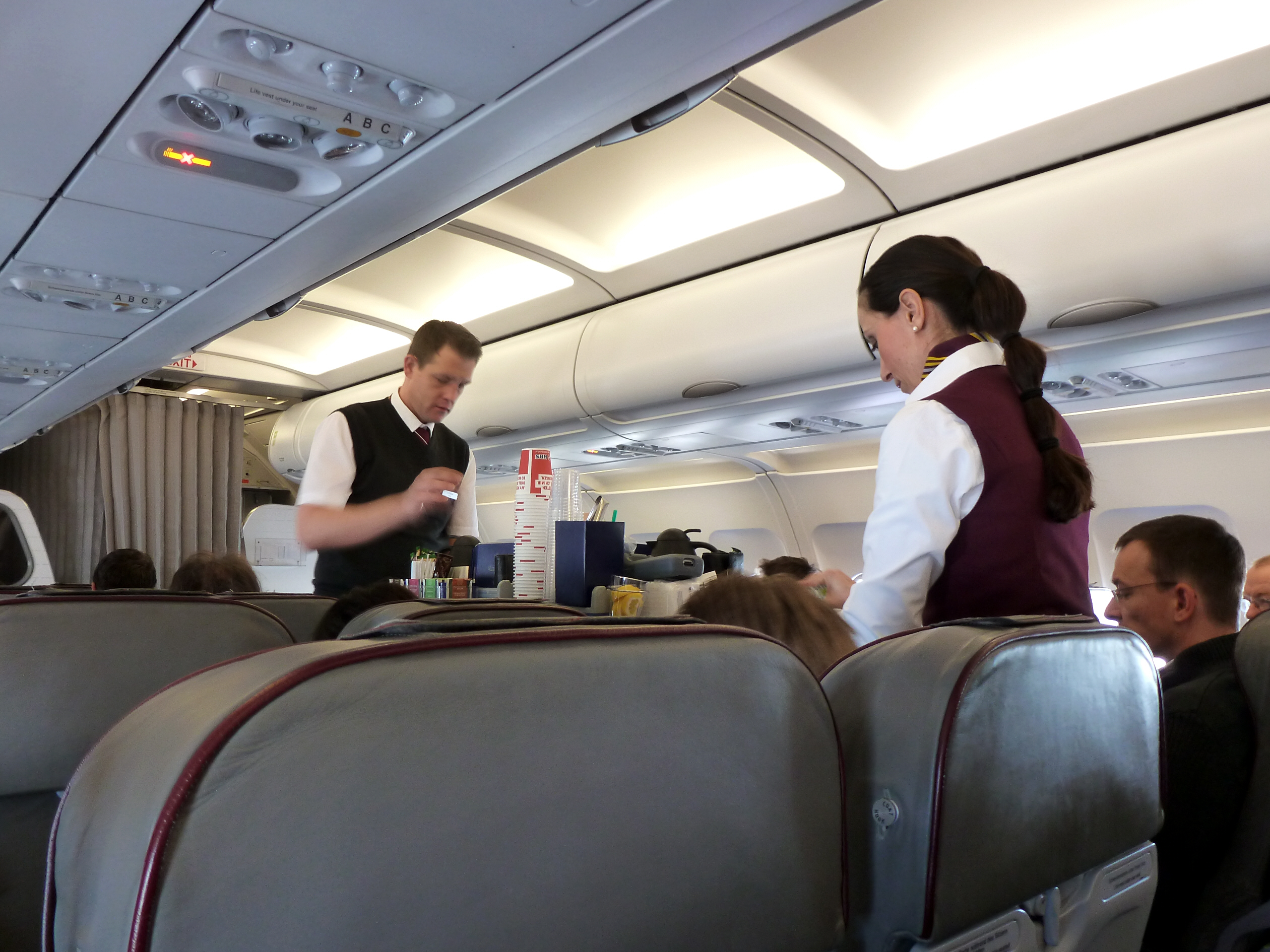
Flight attendants for Germanwings delivering in-flight services

Flight attendants are trained to deal with a wide variety of emergencies, and are trained in first aid. More frequent situations may include a bleeding nose, illness, small injuries, intoxicated passengers, aggressive and anxiety stricken passengers. Emergency training includes rejected take-offs, emergency landings, cardiac and in-flight medical situations, smoke in the cabin, fires, depressurisation, on-board births and deaths, dangerous goods and spills in the cabin, emergency evacuations, hijackings, and water landings.

==== Cabin chimes and overhead panel lights ====
On most commercial airliners, flight attendants receive various forms of notification on board the aircraft in the form of audible chimes and coloured lights above their stations. While the colours and chimes are not universal and may vary between airlines and aircraft types, these colours and chimes are generally the most commonly used:

- Pink (Boeing) or Red (Airbus): interphone calls from the cockpit to a flight attendant and/or interphone calls between two flight attendants, the latter case if a green light is not present or being used for the same purpose (steady with high-low chime), or all services emergency call (flashing with repeated high-low chime). On some airlines Airbus' aircraft (such as Delta Air Lines), this light is accompanied by a high-medium-low chime to call the purser. The Boeing 787 Dreamliner uses a separate red light to indicate a sterile flight deck while using pink for interphone calls from the cockpit.
- Blue: call from passenger in seat (steady with single high chime).
- Amber: call from passenger in lavatory (steady with single high chime), or lavatory smoke detector set off (flashing with repeated high chime).
- Green: on some aircraft (some airlines Airbus aircraft, and the Boeing 787), this colour is used to indicate interphone calls between two flight attendants, distinguishing them from the pink or red light used for interphone calls made from the flight deck to a flight attendant, and is also accompanied with a high-low chime like the pink or red light. On the Boeing 787, a flashing green light with a repeated high-low chime is used to indicate a call to all flight attendant stations.

=== Chief purser ===
The chief purser (CP), also titled as in-flight service manager (ISM), flight service manager (FSM), customer service manager (CSM) or cabin service director (CSD) is the senior flight attendant in the chain of command of flight attendants. While not necessarily the most-senior crew members on a flight (in years of service to their respective carrier), chief pursers can have varying levels of "in-flight" or "on board" bidding seniority or tenure in relation to their flying partners. To reach this position, a crew member requires some minimum years of service as flight attendant. Further training is mandatory, and chief pursers typically earn a higher salary than flight attendants because of the added responsibility and managerial role.

=== Purser ===
The purser is in charge of the cabin crew, in a specific section of a larger aircraft, or the whole aircraft itself (if the purser is the highest ranking). On board a larger aircraft, pursers assist the chief purser in managing the cabin. Pursers are flight attendants or a related job, typically with an airline for several years prior to application for, and further training to become a purser, and normally earn a higher salary than flight attendants because of the added responsibility and supervisory role.

== Qualifications ==
=== Training ===
Minimum entry requirements for a career as a flight attendant is usually the completion of the final year of high school; e.g. the International Baccalaureate. Many prospective attendants have a post-secondary school diploma in an area such as tourism and a number hold degrees having worked in other occupations, often as teachers. Graduates holding degrees, including those with studies in one or more foreign languages, communication studies, business studies, public relations or nursing can be favoured by employers.

Flight attendants are normally trained in the hub or headquarters city of an airline over a period that may run from four weeks to six months, depending on the country and airline. The main focus of training is safety, and attendants are evaluated for each type of aircraft in which they work. One of the most elaborate training facilities was Breech Academy, which Trans World Airlines (TWA) opened in 1969 in Overland Park, Kansas. Other airlines also sent their attendants to the school. However, during the fare wars, the school's viability declined and it closed around 1988.

Safety training includes, but is not limited to: emergency passenger evacuation management, use of evacuation slides / life rafts, in-flight firefighting, first aid, CPR, defibrillation, ditching/emergency landing procedures, decompression emergencies, crew resource management, and security.

In the United States, the Federal Aviation Administration requires flight attendants on aircraft with 20 or more seats and used by an air carrier for transportation to hold a Certificate of Demonstrated Proficiency. It shows that a level of required training has been met. It is not limited to the air carrier at which the attendant is employed (although some initial documents showed the airlines where the holders were working), and is the attendant's personal property. It does have two ratings, Group 1 and Group 2 (listed on the certificate as "Group I" and "Group II"). Either or both of these may be earned depending upon the general type of aircraft, (propeller or turbojet), on which the holder has trained.

There are also training schools, not affiliated with any particular airline, where students generally not only undergo generic, though otherwise practically identical, training to flight attendants employed by an airline, but also take curriculum modules to help them gain employment. These schools often use actual airline equipment for their lessons, though some are equipped with full simulator cabins capable of replicating a number of emergency situations. In some countries, such as France, a degree is required, together with the Certificat de formation à la sécurité (Safety training certificate).

=== Language ===
Multilingual flight attendants are often in demand to accommodate international travellers. The languages most in demand, other than English, are French, Russian, Hindi, Spanish, Mandarin, Cantonese, Bengali, Japanese, Arabic, German, Portuguese, Italian, and Turkish. In the United States, airlines with international routes pay an additional stipend for language skills on top of flight pay, and some airlines hire specifically for certain languages when launching international destinations. Carole Middleton recalled when interviewed in 2018 that "you had to be able to speak another language" when working in the industry in the 1970s.

=== Height ===
Most airlines have height requirements for safety reasons, making sure that all flight attendants can reach overhead safety equipment. Typically, the acceptable height for this is over 152 cm (60 in) but under 185 cm (73 in) tall. Regional carriers using small aircraft with low ceilings can have height restrictions. Some airlines, such as EVA Air, have height requirements for purely aesthetic purposes.

== Presentation ==
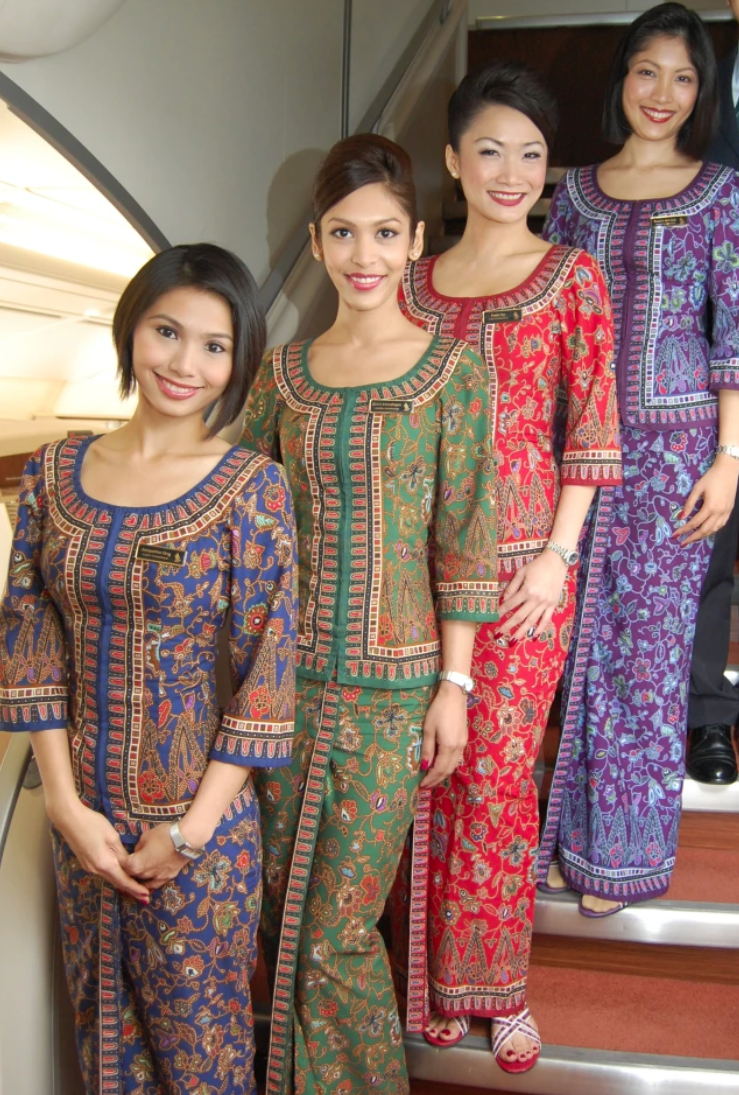
Singapore Girls dressed in Singapore Airlines's distinctive sarong kebaya uniforms

The overall presentation of flight attendants' has transformed over the decades. Many early uniforms had a strongly military appearance; hats, jackets, and skirts showed simple straight lines and military details like epaulettes and brass buttons. Many uniforms had a summer and winter version, differentiated by colours and fabrics appropriate to the season: navy blue for winter, for example, khaki for summer. But as the role of women in the air grew, and airline companies began to realise the publicity value of their female flight attendants, more feminine lines and colours began to appear in the late 1930s and early 1940s. Some airlines began to commission designs from high-end department stores and still others called in noted designers or even milliners to create distinctive and attractive apparel. During the 1960s, Pacific Southwest Airlines (PSA) was known for brightly coloured female flight attendant uniforms that included short miniskirts. In the early 1970s, the uniform changed to hotpants.

=== Haute couture ===
In the 1930s, the first flight attendant uniforms were designed to be durable, practical, and inspire confidence in passengers with the first female flight attendants dressing in uniforms resembling nurses' outfits. The first female flight attendants for United Airlines wore green berets, green capes and nurse's shoes and other airlines, such as Eastern Air Lines, actually dressed female flight attendants in nurses' uniforms. However, by the 1960s a number of airlines were promoting their flight attendants' uniforms as evoking the refinement of haute couture. In March 1962, Air France launched a new model designed by Marc Bohan at Dior, introducing the "Air France" model into its Haute couture collection. Hainan Airlines debuted their new flight attendant's uniforms at the 2017 Laurence Xu Haute Couture Show at Paris Couture Week.

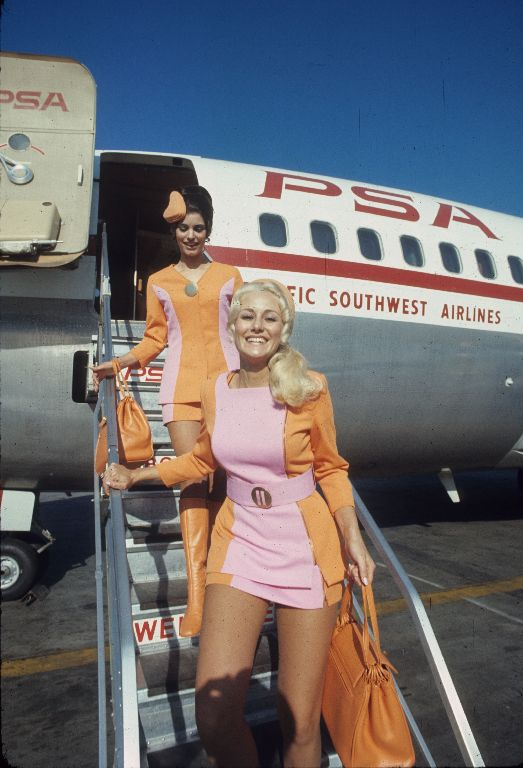
During the 1960s, Pacific Southwest Airlines (PSA) was known for brightly coloured female flight attendant uniforms that included short miniskirts. In the early 1970s, the uniform changed to hotpants. Photo shows PSA flight attendants in 1960s.

Since the 1980s, Asian airlines, especially national flag carriers, usually feature the traditional dress and fabrics of their respective country in their female flight attendants' uniform. It was meant as a marketing strategy to showcase their national culture as well as to convey welcoming warmth and hospitality. For example, Thai Airways flight attendants are required to change from their corporate purple suits into traditional Thai costume prior to passengers boarding. Garuda Indonesia, Malaysia Airlines and Singapore Airlines female flight attendants wear modified kebayas, with batik motifs on them. For example, Garuda Indonesia's design, called 'Lereng Garuda Indonesia' is inspired by the traditional batik motif of 'Parang Gondosuli'. Vietnam Airlines flight attendants wear red áo dài and Air India flight attendants wear a sari on all passenger flights.

=== Uniform and makeup ===
During the mid-1990s, several U.S.-based airlines required female flight attendants to wear shoes with heels. Minimum heel heights ranged from 1/2 to 2 in (13 to 51 mm) mandated by US Airways. Flight attendants at times avoided censure by changing into more comfortable shoes during flights, since their supervisors were less likely to be present there.

In 2015, the Israeli airline El Al introduced a requirement that female flight attendants wear high heels until passengers had been seated. The airline's workers' union stated that the requirement would endanger the health and safety of the flight attendants and instructed its members to ignore the rule. Later that year the requirement was removed.

Until 2016, some female crew members on British Airways were required to wear British Airways' standard "ambassador" uniform, which has not traditionally included trousers.

In 2019, Virgin Atlantic began to allow its female flight attendants to wear trousers and not wear makeup.

In 2023, Qantas declared that it had ended uniform rules based on gender. Female flight attendants are no longer required to wear high heels, male flight attendants can wear makeup, and flight attendants of any gender can wear the same type of jewellery and have long hair in a ponytail or bun.

In 2026, Korean Air began to allow its flight attendants to wear sneakers or other more comfortable footwear while performing their in-flight duties, putting an end to a 57-year-old rule requiring that they wear 3-5 centimeter heeled shoes.

== Health conditions ==
A 2018 study found higher instances of melanoma, breast, uterine, gastrointestinal, cervical, and thyroid cancers reported in flight attendants in contrast to the general population. Specifically, the increased cancer cases reported were seen in breast cancer (3.4% of flight crew compared to 2.3% in the general population - a 50% increase), cervical cancer (1.0% compared to 0.70%), gastrointestinal cancer (0.47% compared to 0.27% – a 74% increase), thyroid cancer (0.67% compared to 0.56%) and higher rates of both melanoma and non-melanoma skin cancers with reports of the latter increasing with every five years spent in the job. The study did not look into what causes this increase, but the authors said increased exposure to ionizing radiation from time spent in the thinner upper atmosphere, poor cabin air quality as well as disrupted sleep and meal cycles could be factors.

Other studies have found increased rates of breast and skin cancer, reduced respiratory health, adverse reproductive and perinatal outcomes, musculoskeletal injuries, and higher rates of mental health conditions in flight attendants.

=== Radiation ===
Flight attendants and crew members are known to be exposed to cosmic ionizing radiation which is a form of radiation that comes from space and intensifies as altitude above sea level increases. The International Agency for Research on Cancer of the World Health Organization lists ionizing radiation as a known human carcinogen. Passengers are also exposed to this type of cosmic radiation, but they spend considerably less time on average in the air than crew members. An online travel agency report found, in particular, that travelling adults in Britain spend on average 306 hours on flights to holiday destinations during their lifetime. In contrast, according to the US Federal Aviation Administration, a flight attendant can spend up to 30 hours of flight time in seven consecutive days and in some cases more. The effect of cosmic radiation on air crew members is a subject of a growing body of research.

Cabin crew members are also regularly exposed to more UV radiation than the general population, which can make these workers more vulnerable to skin cancers.

The U.S. National Council on Radiation Protection (NCRP) reports that aircrew have the largest average annual effective dose of all U.S. radiation workers.

=== Cabin air quality ===
Poor cabin air quality is a subject of ongoing study in relation to symptoms such as headache, fatigue, fever, and respiratory difficulties among many others that have been reported by flight attendants, particularly on long-haul routes. There is also much concern regarding the transmission of contagious diseases, particularly tuberculosis. An open question remains whether these complaints are due to poor cabin air quality or to other factors inherent in flights, such as lowered barometric pressure, hypoxia, low humidity, etc. Other chemical contaminants found in the cabin may include engine leakages, pesticides and flame retardants, which contain compounds that may act as hormone disruptors and increase the risk of some cancers.

=== Sleep disruption ===
Flight attendants often have disrupted sleep cycles. They are more likely to have disruptions in their sleep patterns because they may work at night, cross time zones, and have irregular schedules. There is some evidence linking sleep disruptions to increased cancer risk. Flight attendants may also have different lifestyle behaviours related to diet, physical activity, and health care than the general population which could affect overall health and cancer risk.

=== Secondhand tobacco smoke ===
Many of the flight attendants working today were exposed to second-hand in-flight smoke before smoking bans were enacted in the late 20th and early 21st century. The long-term effects of this historical secondhand smoke exposure have not been well characterised.

== Sexual harassment ==
Flight attendants are exposed to verbal and sexual harassment. Studies in the United States and Australia have found that the vast majority (two-thirds) of flight attendants experience sexual harassment in the course of their careers, including sexual assault, inappropriate touching and sexual comments both by colleagues and passengers.

Flight attendants describe the verbal sexual harassment as comments that are "nasty, unwanted, lewd, crude, inappropriate, uncomfortable, sexual, suggestive, and dirty". They also report being subjected to passengers' explicit sexual fantasies, propositions, request for sexual "favours" and pornographic videos and pictures.

The studies also found that 70% of flight attendants who experience sexual harassment on the job "chose not to report the incident because they did not think it would be dealt with appropriately or they were concerned reporting it would make the situation worse" and "their airline was not doing enough to put a stop to harassment", and that "they have not noticed any employer efforts over the past year to address sexual harassment at work."

== Emotional labour ==
The concept of emotional labour as the process of managing feelings and expressions to fulfil the emotional requirements of a job through a publicly visible facial and bodily display within the workplace (as opposed to the concept of emotion work, i.e. the management of one's feelings in private life) was first established and linked to the profession of flight attendants by Professor Emerita of Sociology Arlie Hochschild, in her book, The Managed Heart. According to Hochschild, flight attendants do emotional labour to enhance the status of the customer and entice further sales by their friendliness, and support this effort by evoking feelings that make the "nice" display seem natural. With regard to how flight attendants are supposed to use their smile in the job, the author writes:

[I]n the flight attendant's work, smiling is separated from its usual function, which is to express a personal feeling, and attached to another one—expressing a company feeling. The company exhorts them to smile more, and "more sincerely," at an increasing number of passengers. The workers respond to the speed-up with a slowdown: they smile less broadly, with a quick release and no sparkle in the eyes, thus dimming the company's message to the people. It is a war of smiles.

Hochschild notes that corporate logic in the airline industry generates a series of links between competition, market expansion, advertising, heightened passenger expectations about rights to display, and company demands for acting; and when conditions allow this logic to work, private use of emotional exchange gives way to corporate use of emotional exchange.

Hochschild also writes of how flight attendants are trained to control passengers' feelings during times of turbulence and dangerous situations while suppressing their own fear or anxiety.

The emotional labour performed by flight attendants and cross-cultural aspects of it have since been actively studied and are a topic of ongoing research.

== Sponsorship and advertising ==
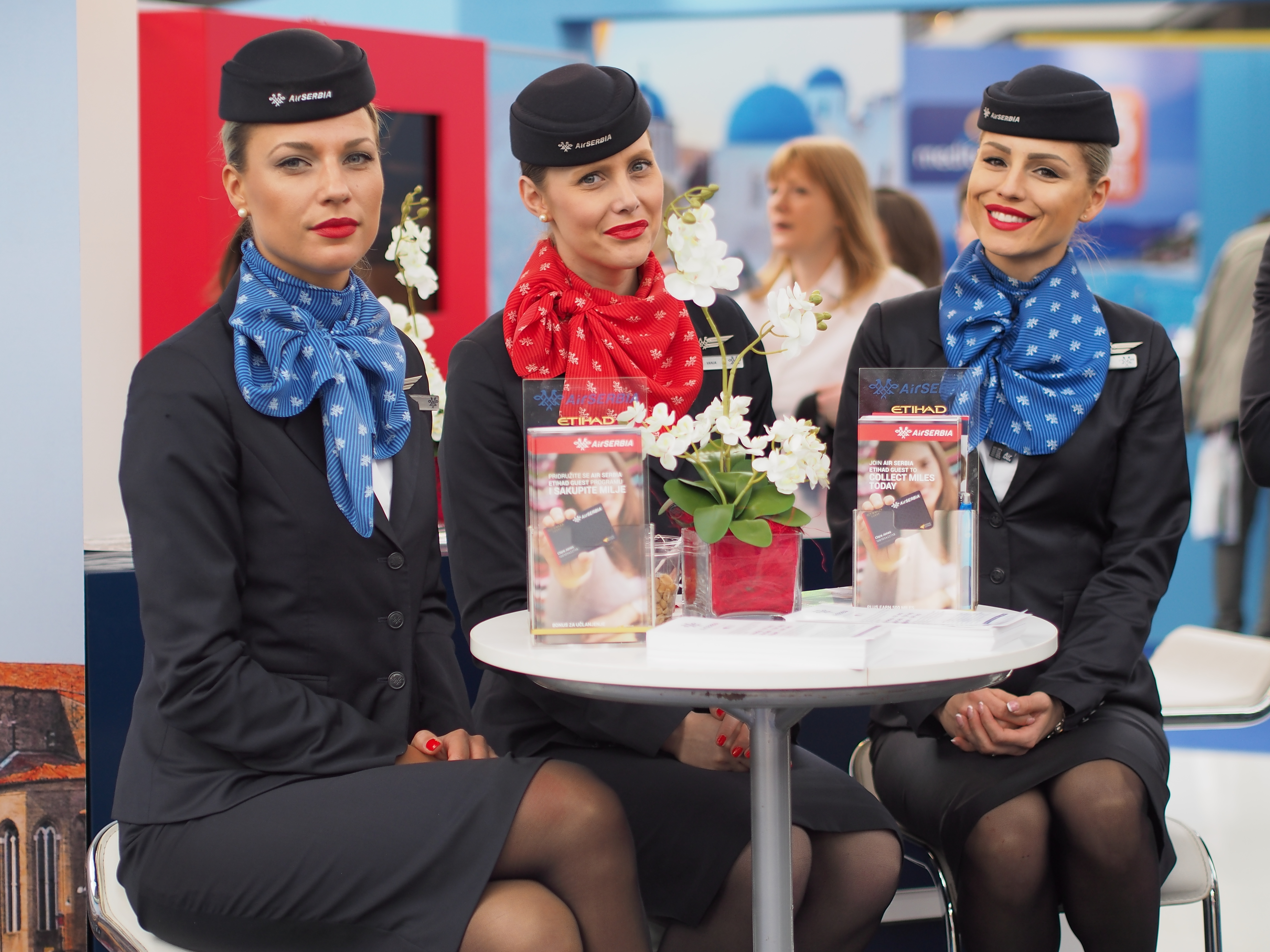
Air Serbia flight attendants (Tourist Fair Belgrade 2017)

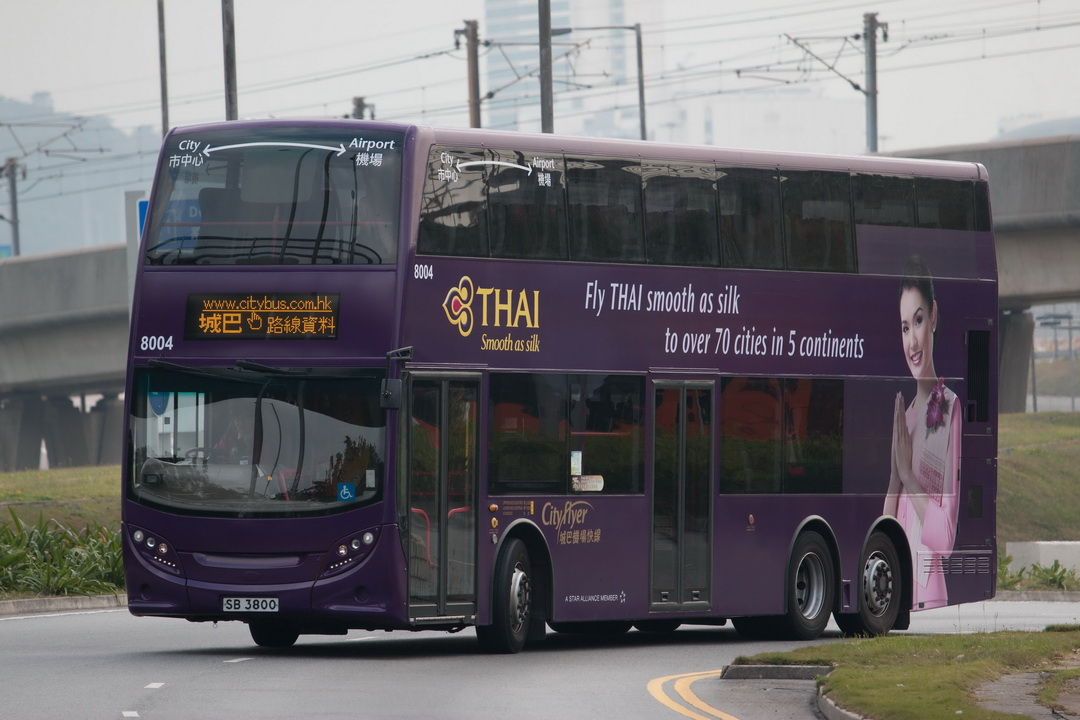
Thai Airways wrap advertising on a double-decker bus in Hong Kong featuring a flight attendant

In the 1960s and 1970s, many airlines began advertising the attractiveness and friendliness of their flight attendants. National Airlines began a "Fly Me"; campaign using attractive female flight attendants with taglines such as "I'm Lorraine. Fly me to Orlando." Braniff International Airways presented a campaign known as the "Air Strip" with similarly attractive young female flight attendant changing uniforms mid-flight. In the United States, many airlines had a policy such that only unmarried women could be flight attendants, as well as a mandatory retirement age of 32 for flight attendants because of the belief women would be less appealing and attractive after this age. Many of the women were recruited as seniors in college and in beauty pageants.

In 1968, the EEOC declared age restrictions on flight attendants' employment to be illegal sex discrimination under Title VII of the Civil Rights Act of 1964. Emirates have long sponsored international sporting events and employ their flight attendants to present awards at Wimbledon and other events.

== Unions ==
Flight attendant unions were formed, beginning at United Airlines in the 1940s, to negotiate improvements in pay, benefits and working conditions. Those unions would later challenge what they perceived as sexist stereotypes and unfair work practices such as age limits, size limits, limitations on marriage, and prohibition of pregnancy. Many of these limitations have been lifted by judicial mandates. The largest flight attendants' union is the Association of Flight Attendants, representing nearly 60,000 flight attendants at 19 airlines within the US.

The Association of Professional Flight Attendants represents the flight attendants of American Airlines, the world's largest carrier. APFA is the largest independent flight attendant union in the world.

In the UK, British Airways cabin crew were historically represented by two main union groups: the British Airways Stewards and Stewardesses Association (BASSA), affiliated with the Transport and General Workers' Union, and the smaller Cabin Crew '89, which later became part of Amicus. Following the merger of the two unions in 2007, both groups became branches of Unite.

In Australia, flight attendants are represented by the Flight Attendants' Association of Australia (FAAA). There are two divisions: one for international crews (long-haul) and one for domestic crews (short-haul).

In New Zealand, flight attendants can be represented by either the Flight Attendants and Related Services Association (FARSA) or by the Engineering, Printing and Manufacturing Union (EPMU).

In Canada, flight attendants are represented by either the Canadian Union of Public Employees (CUPE) or by the Canadian Flight Attendants Union (CFAU).

=== Discrimination ===
Originally, female flight attendants were required to be single upon hiring, and were fired if they got married, exceeded weight regulations, or reached age 32 or 35 depending on the airline. In the 1970s, the group Stewardesses for Women's Rights protested sexist advertising and company discrimination, and brought many cases to court. In 1964, United States President Lyndon B. Johnson signed the Civil Rights Act into law which prohibited sex discrimination and led to the creation of the Equal Employment Opportunity Commission in 1968. The EEOC ruled that sex was not a bona fide occupational requirement to be a flight attendant. For flight attendants, this meant that they had an official governing body to report offences to and allowed them to successfully challenge age ceiling and marriage bans in relation to their effectiveness as employees.

In 1968, the EEOC declared age restrictions on flight attendants' employment to be illegal sex discrimination under Title VII of the Civil Rights Act of 1964. The restriction of hiring only women was lifted at all airlines in 1971 due to the decisive court case of Diaz v. Pan Am. The no-marriage rule was eliminated throughout the US airline industry by the 1980s. The last such broad categorical discrimination, the weight restrictions, were relaxed in the 1990s through litigation and negotiations. By the end of the 1970s, the term stewardess had generally been replaced by the gender-neutral alternative flight attendant. Also, during the 1980s and 1990s, more men were allowed to apply as flight attendants, helping to create more usage of this term. More recently the term cabin crew or cabin staff has begun to replace 'flight attendants' in some parts of the world, because of the term's recognition of their role as members of the crew.

== Roles in emergencies ==
Actions of flight attendants in emergencies have long been credited in saving lives; in the United States, the National Transportation Safety Board (NTSB) and other aviation authorities view flight attendants as essential for safety, and are thus usually required on Part 121 aircraft operations. Studies, some done in light of the 1985 Manchester Airport disaster (British Airtours Flight 28M), have concluded that assertive cabin crew are essential for the rapid evacuation of aeroplanes.

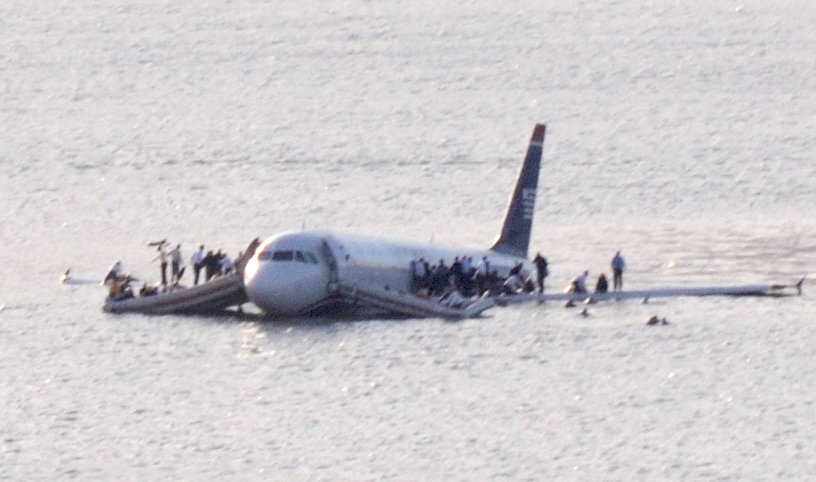
Flight 1549 landing on the waters of the Hudson River

During an emergency landing, flight attendants can save lives, as they did during the US Airways Flight 1549 landing. The pilots and flight attendants were awarded the Master's Medal of the Guild of Air Pilots and Air Navigators in recognition of their "heroic and unique aviation achievement". The crew also were awarded by New York City Mayor Michael Bloomberg the Keys to the City.

=== 11 September 2001 ===
The role of flight attendants received heightened prominence after the September 11 attacks when flight attendants (such as Sandra W. Bradshaw and CeeCee Lyles of United Airlines Flight 93; Robert Fangman of United Airlines Flight 175; Renee May of American Airlines Flight 77; and Betty Ong and Madeline Amy Sweeney of American Airlines Flight 11) actively attempted to protect passengers from assault, and also provided vital information to air traffic controllers on the hijackings, as did many passengers.

In the wake of these attacks, many flight attendants at major airlines were laid off because of decreased passenger loads.

== Gallery ==
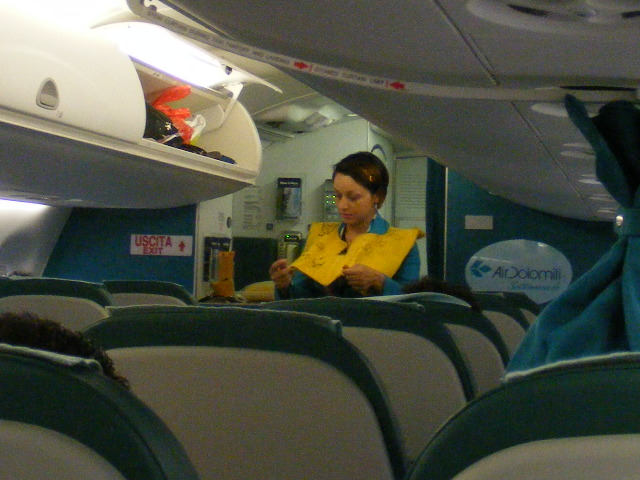
Air Dolomiti flight attendant

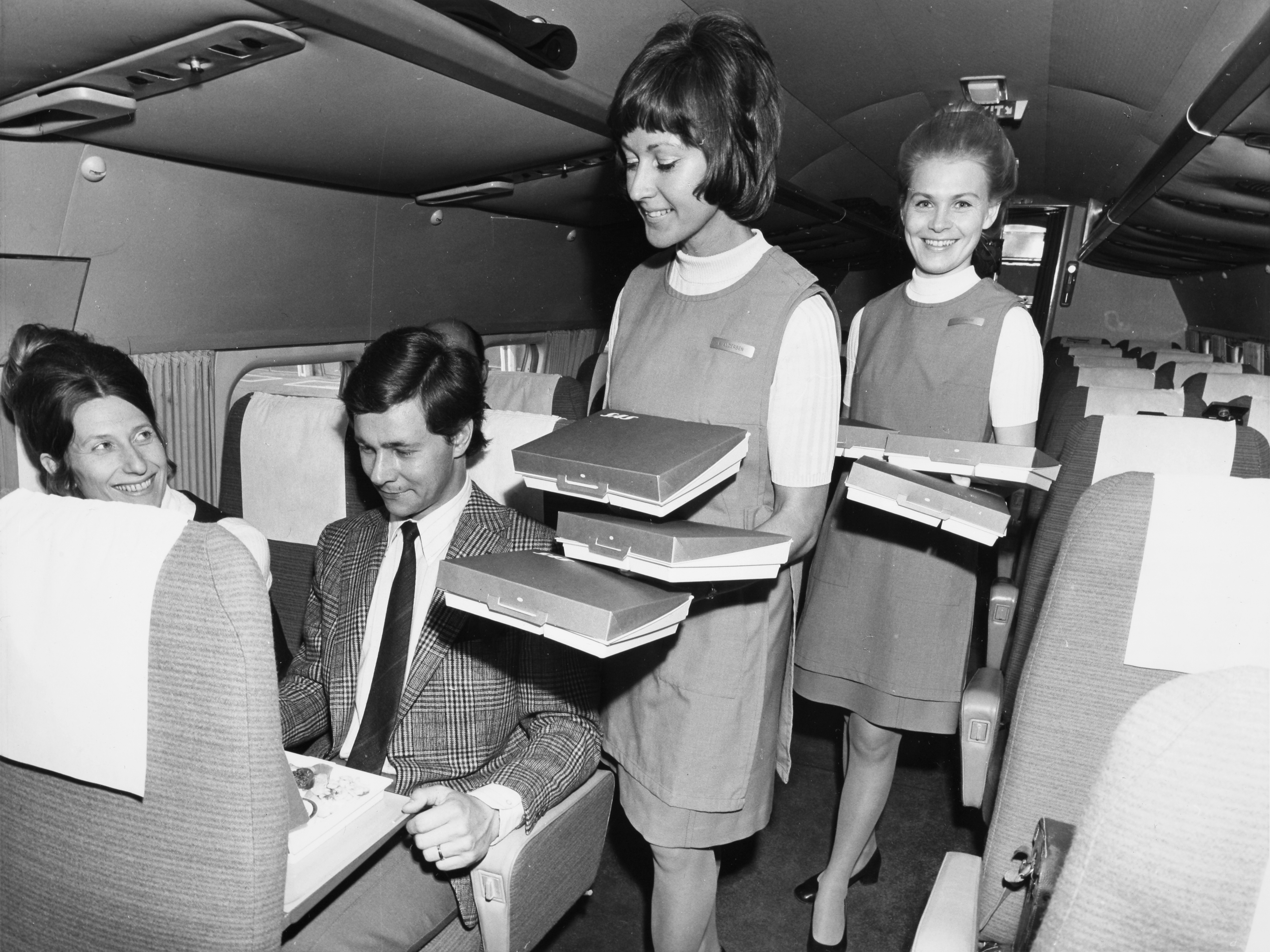
Scandinavian Airlines flight attendants in the 1960s

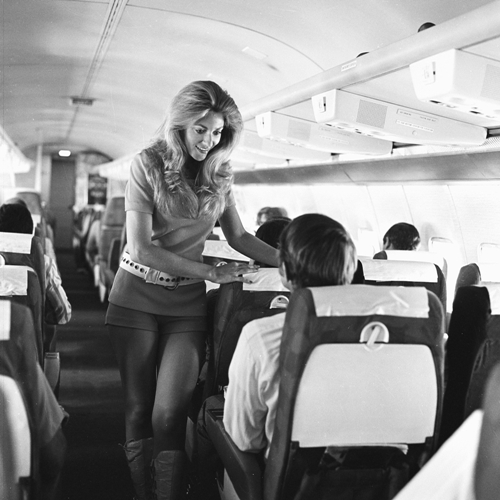
Southwest Airlines flight attendant

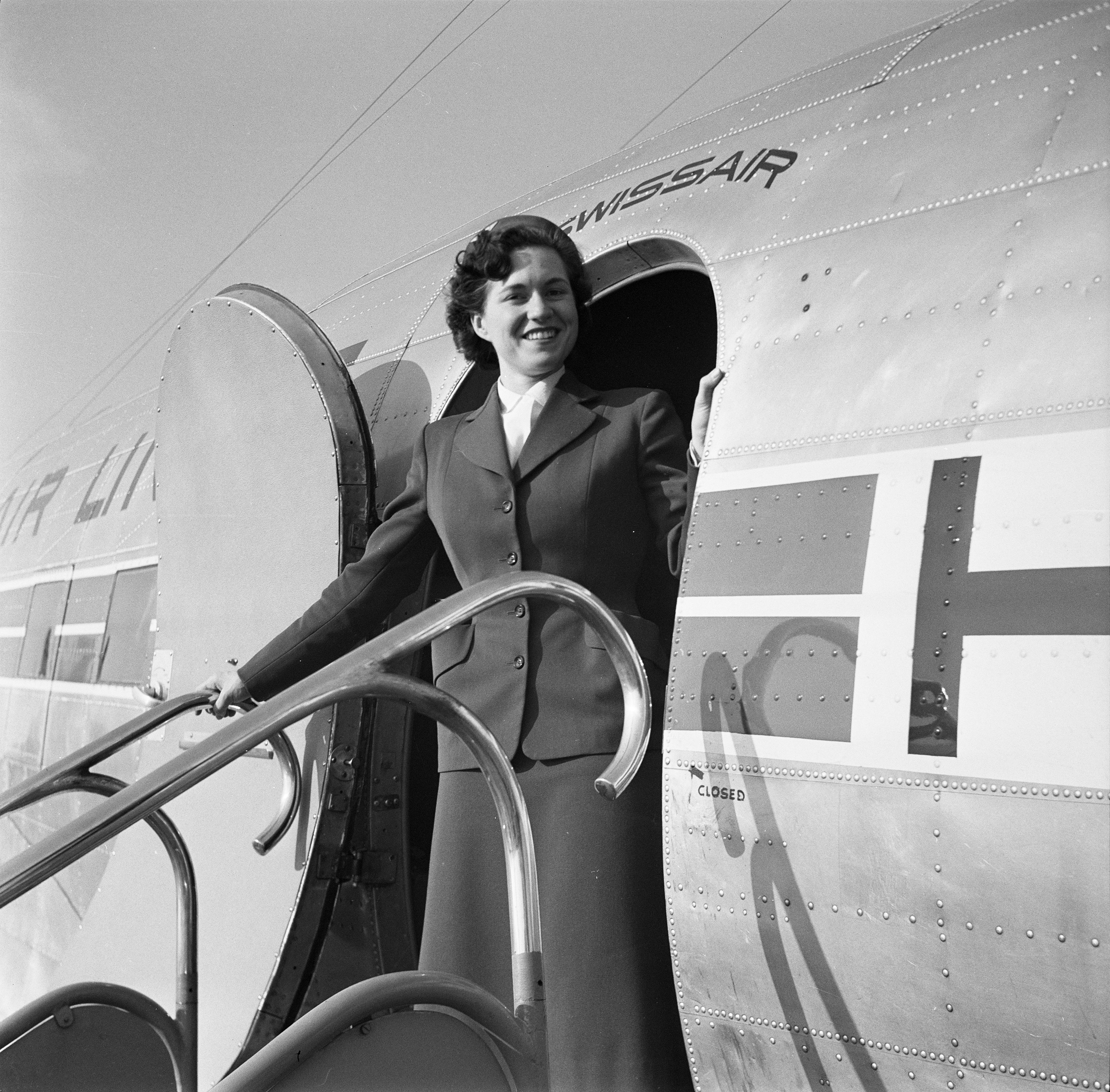
Swissair flight attendant, 1953

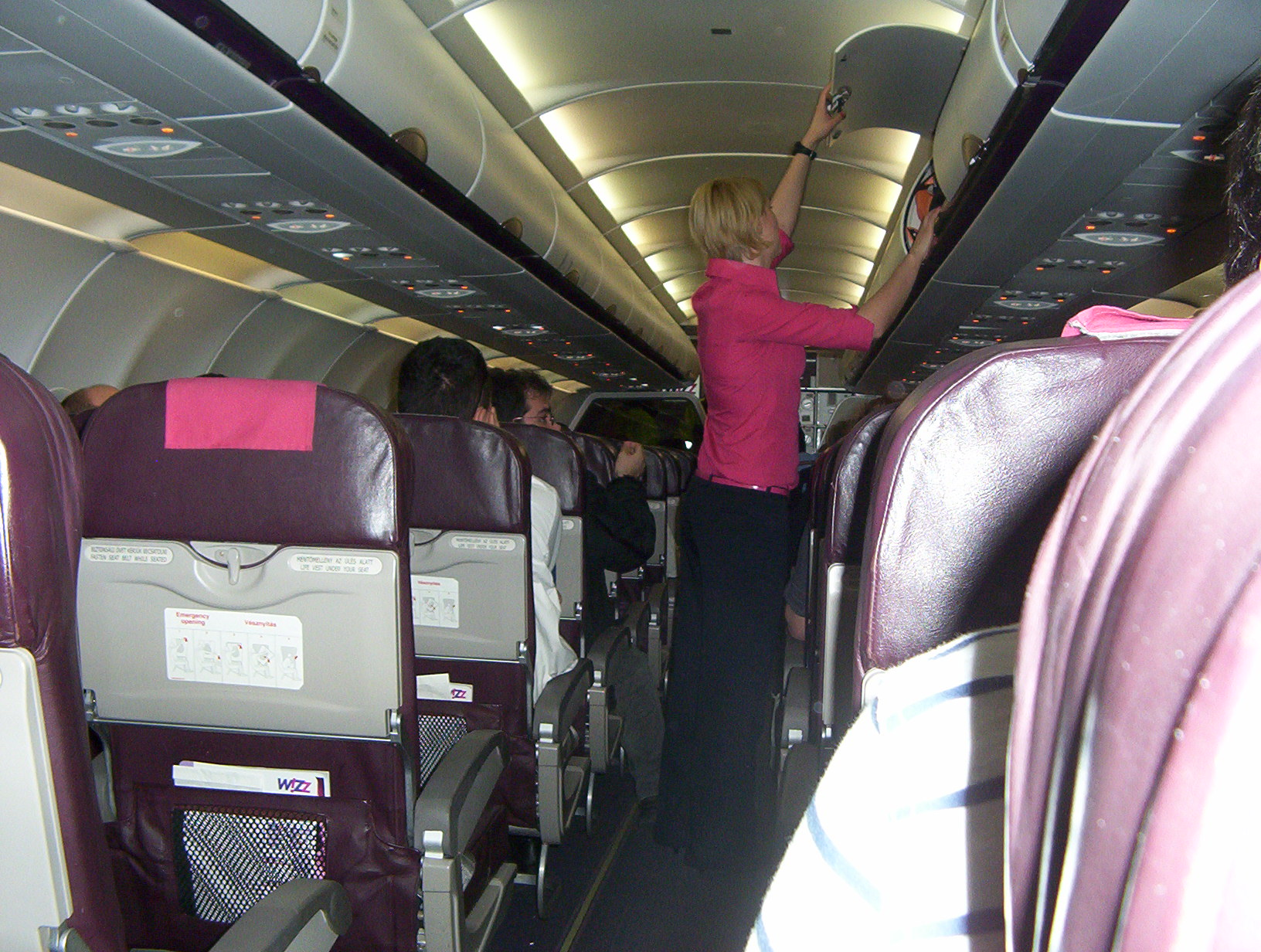
Wizz Air flight attendant

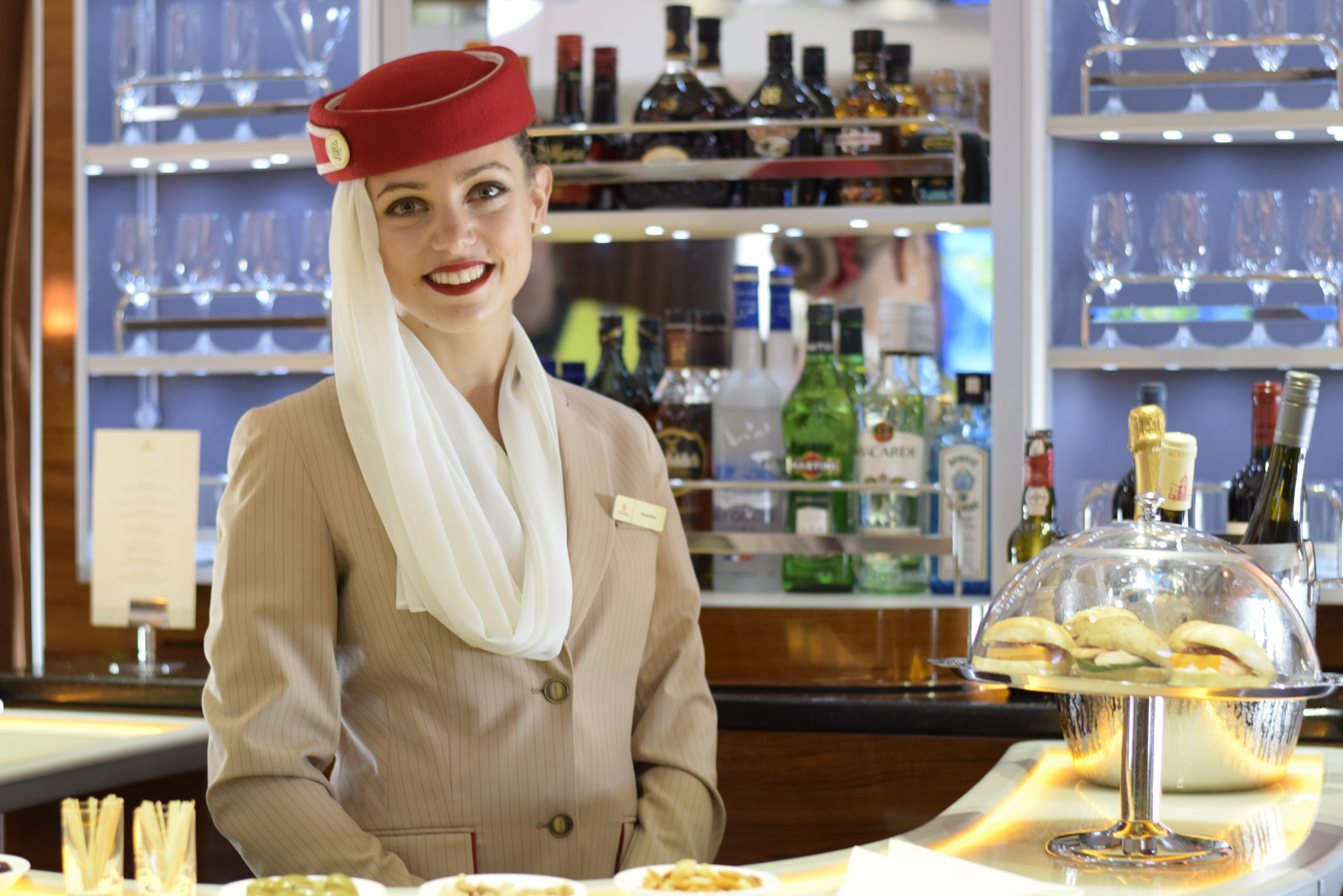
Emirates flight attendant in the A380 bar for Emirates

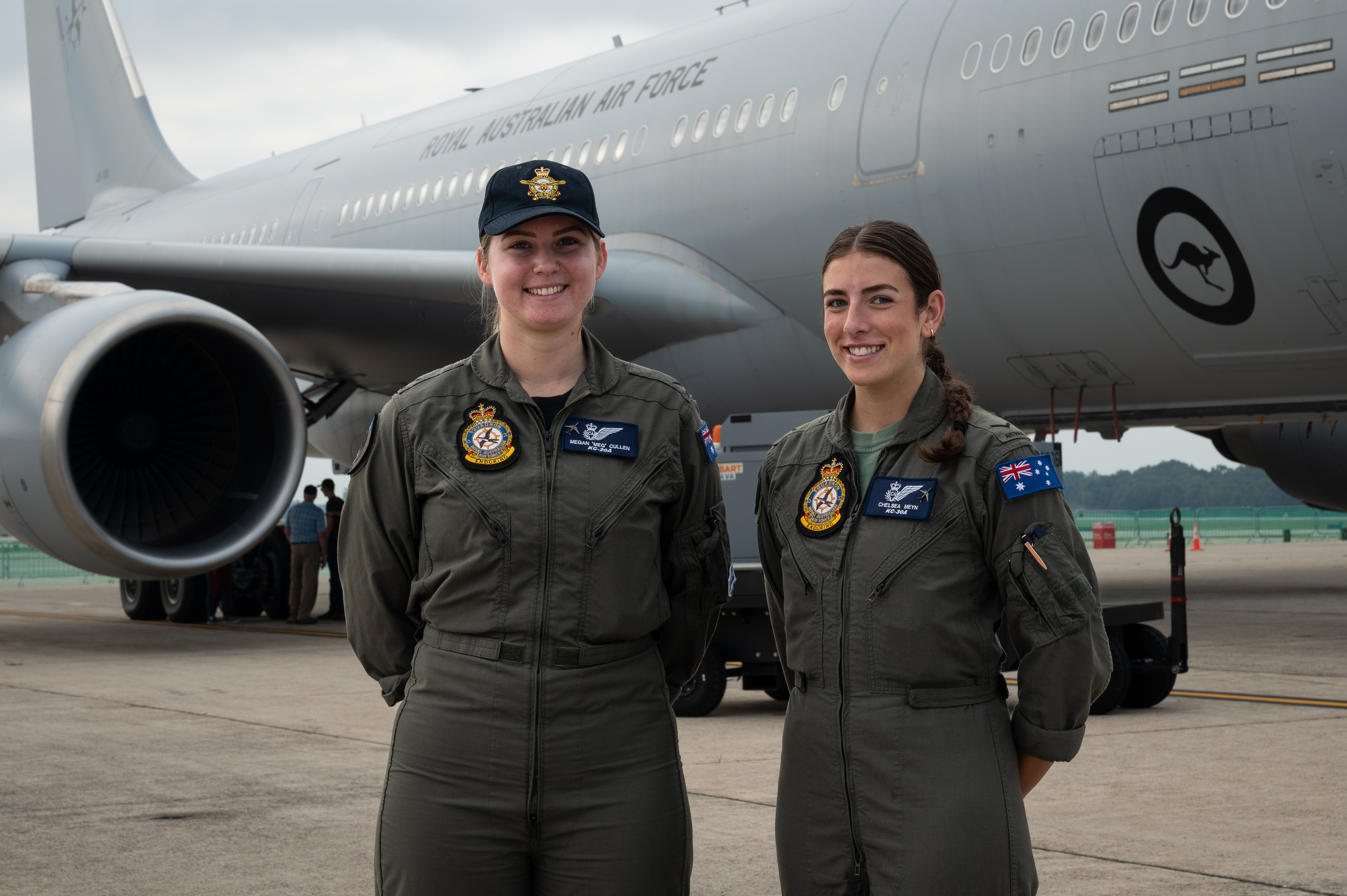
Two Royal Australian Air Force crew attendants in 2023
