= Curtiss T-32 Condor II =

Family of airliners and bomber aircraft

T-32 Condor II
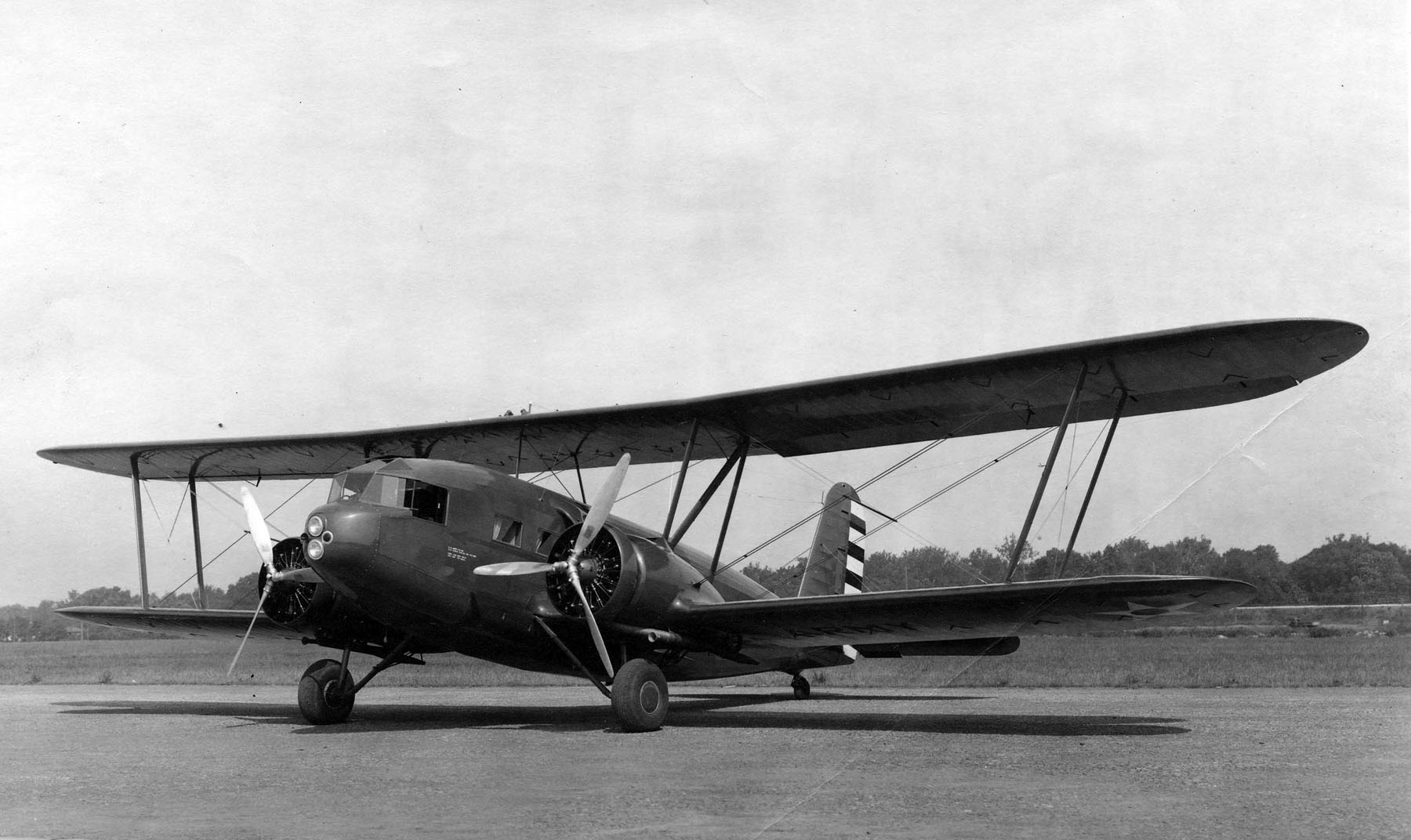
- A USAAC YC-30 in 1933

General information
- Type: Biplane transport and bomber
- Manufacturer: Curtiss Aeroplane and Motor Company
- Number built: 45

History
- First flight: 30 January 1933
- Developed from: B-2 Condor

The Curtiss T-32 Condor II was a 1930s American biplane airliner and bomber aircraft built by the Curtiss Aeroplane and Motor Company. It was used by the United States Army Air Corps as an executive transport.

== Development ==
The Condor II was a 1933 two-bay biplane of mixed construction with a single vertical stabilizer and rudder, and retractable landing gear. It was powered by two Wright Cyclone radial engines. The first aircraft was flown on 30 January 1933 and a production batch of 21 aircraft was then built. The production aircraft were fitted out as 12-passenger luxury night sleeper transports. They entered service with Eastern Air Transport and American Airways, forerunners of Eastern Air Lines and American Airlines, respectively, on regular night services for the next three years. In August 1933, the first practical variable-pitch propeller was introduced into airline service on a Condor II.

The June 15, 1934, American Airlines system timetable marketed its Condors as being "The World's First Complete Sleeper-Planes" with these 12-passenger aircraft being equipped with sleeper berths and also as being capable of cruising at 190 miles per hour (306 km/h). An example of the Condor services operated by American were daily overnight flights between Dallas and Los Angeles during the mid-1930s with a routing of Dallas–Ft. Worth–Abilene–Big Spring, TX–El Paso–Douglas, AZ–Tucson–Phoenix–Los Angeles.

The Colombian Air Force operated three BT-32s equipped with floats in the Colombia-Peru War in 1933.

Two modified T-32s were bought by the United States Army Air Corps (designated YC-30) for use as executive transports. One Condor was converted with extra fuel tanks and used by the 1939–1941 United States Antarctic Service Expedition, and unique for a Condor, had a fixed undercarriage to allow use on floats or skis. Some aircraft were later modified to AT-32 standard with variable-pitch propellers and improved engine nacelles. The AT-32D variant could be converted from sleeper configuration to daytime use with 15 seats. Four T-32s operating in the United Kingdom were pressed into service with the Royal Air Force at the outbreak of World War II.

Eight bomber variants (BT-32) were built with manually operated machine-gun turrets in the nose and above the rear fuselage. All these aircraft were exported. A military cargo version (CT-32) was also built for Argentina. It had a large loading door on the starboard side of the fuselage.

== Variants ==
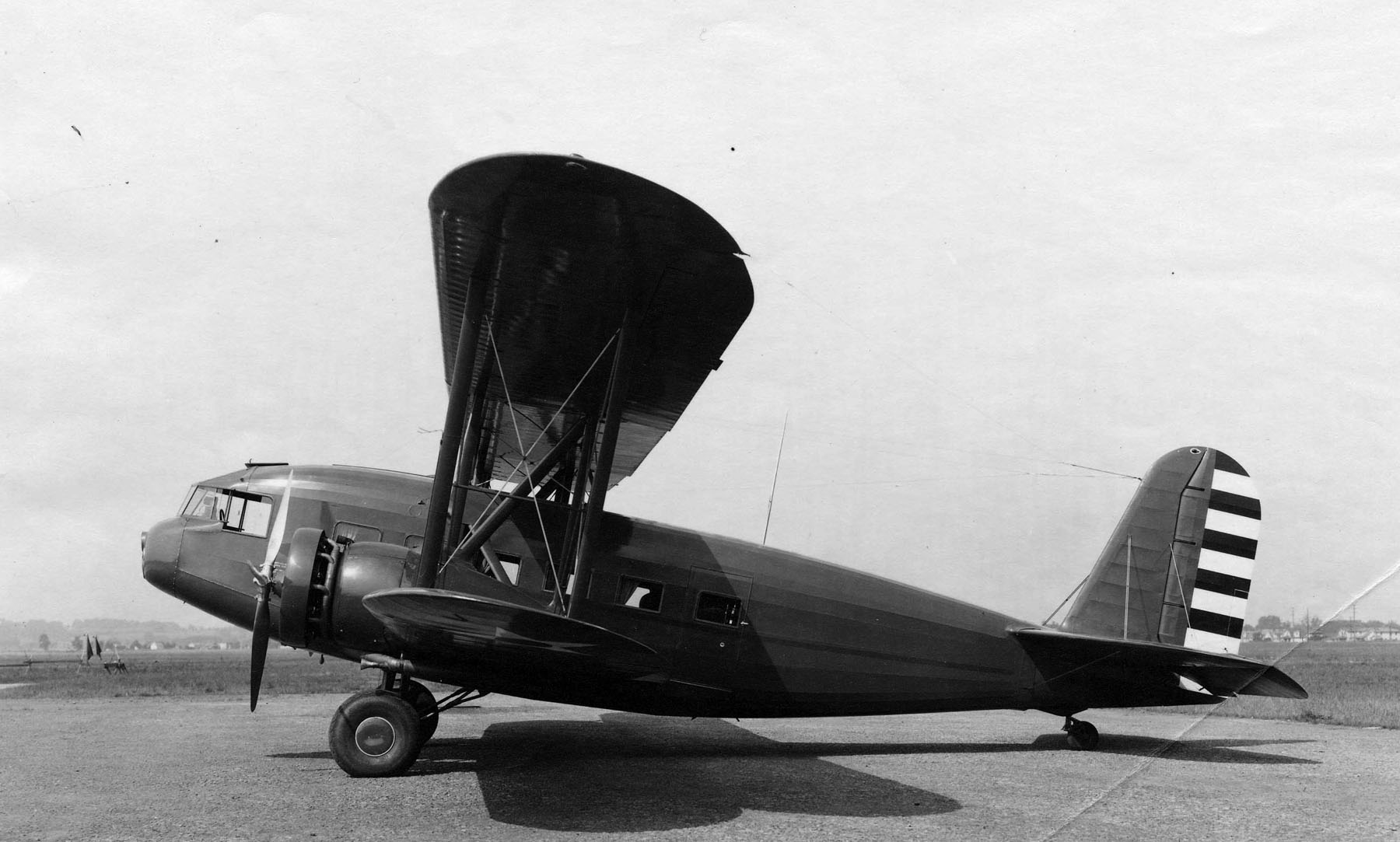
A USAAC YC-30 in 1933.

T-32
Production luxury night sleeper, 21 built including two as YC-30s
T-32C
Ten T-32s modified to AT-32 standard.
AT-32A
Variant with variable-pitch propellers and 710 hp (529 kW) Wright SGR-1820-F3 Cyclone engines, three built.
AT-32B
An AT-32 variant with 720 hp (537 kW) Wright SGR-1820-F2 Cyclone engines, three built.
AT-32C
An AT-32 variant, one built for Swissair.
AT-32D
An AT-32 variant with 720 hp (537 kW) Wright SGR-1820-F3 Cyclone engines, one built.
AT-32E
AT-32 variant for the United States Navy as the R4C-1, two built.
BT-32
Bomber variant, eight built.
CT-32
Military cargo variant with large cargo door, three built.
YC-30
United States Army Air Corps designation for two T-32s.

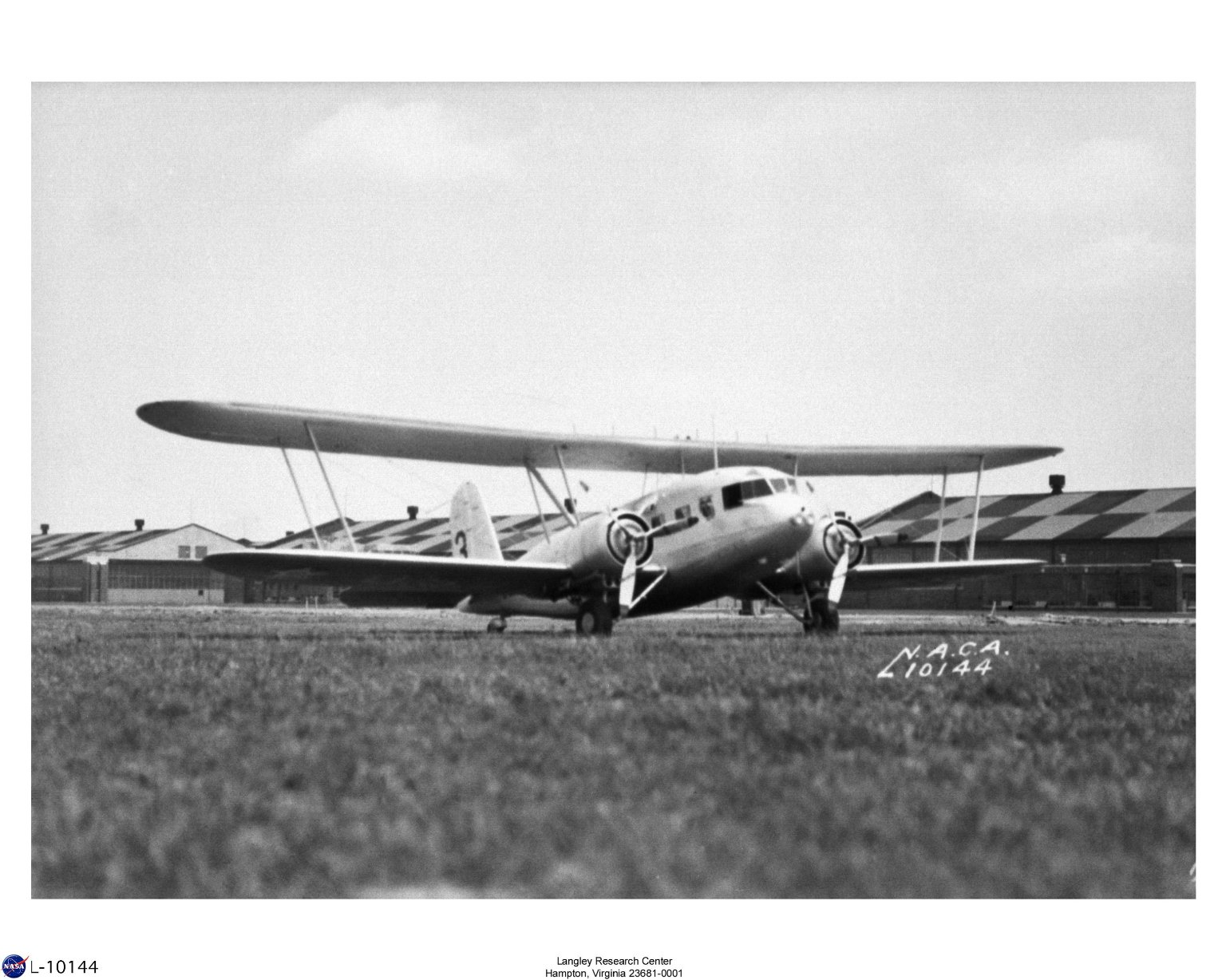
Curtiss R4C-1

R4C-1
United States Navy designation for two AT-32Es (one for United States Marine Corps) both later to the United States Antarctic Service.

== Operators ==
=== Civil operators ===
Chile

- LAN-Chile operated three former American Airlines aircraft

China

- China National Aviation Corporation operated six AT-32E freighters

Colombia

- SACO/Avianca operated 2

El Salvador

- TACA International Airlines

Switzerland

- Swissair

United Kingdom

- International Air Freight, Croydon operated four T-32s.

United States

- American Airways (subsequently renamed American Airlines)
- Eastern Air Transport (subsequently renamed Eastern Air Lines)

=== Military operators ===
Argentina

- Argentine Naval Aviation operated three aircraft of the CT-32 variant, one as a crew trainer and two as freighters.

China

- Chinese Nationalist Air Force operated BT-32 variant.

Colombia

- Colombian Air Force operated three BT-32 variants on floats.

Honduras

- Honduran Air Force

Peru

- Peruvian Air Force operated BT-32 variant.

United Kingdom

- Royal Air Force – Four T-32 variants impressed from International Air Freight. Not used in service and scrapped at No 30 Maintenance Unit. RAF Sealand.

United States

- United States Army Air Corps operated two YC-30 aircraft.
- United States Marine Corps received one R4C-1 aircraft.
- United States Navy received one R4C-1 aircraft.

== Accidents and incidents ==
- On 27 July 1934, Swissair Condor CH-170 broke up in mid-air and crashed at Tuttlingen, Germany killing all 12 passengers and crew. Among those was Nelly Diener, 22, Europe's first female flight attendant on her 79th flight.

== Specifications (T-32 Condor II ATC-501) ==
Data from Juptner, Joseph P. (1974). US Civil Aircraft: Vol. 6 (ATC 501 - 600). Aero Publishers, Inc. pp. 9–12. ISBN 0816891702.

General characteristics

- Crew: Two
- Capacity: 15 passengers and up to 600 lb (270 kg) of mail
- Length: 48 ft 10 in (14.88 m)
- Upper wingspan: 82 ft 0 in (24.99 m)
- Lower wingspan: 74 ft 0 in (22.56 m) * Wing chord (upper and lower): 8 ft 10 in (2.69 m)
- Wing dihedral: 2.0°
- Height: 16 ft 10 in (5.13 m)
- Wing area: 1,208 sq ft (112.2 m^{2}) ** Upper wing area 702 sq ft (65.2 m^{2})
  - Lower wing area 506 sq ft (47.0 m^{2})
- Airfoil: NACA 2412
- Empty weight: 11,235 lb (5,096 kg)
- Gross weight: 16,800 lb (7,620 kg) * Maximum load: 5,565 lb (2,524 kg)
- Fuel capacity: 300 US gal (1,100 L; 250 imp gal) in 4 x 75 US gal (280 L; 62 imp gal) tanks
- Oil capacity: 30 US gal (110 L; 25 imp gal)
- Undercarriage track: 20 ft 4 in (6.20 m)
- Powerplant: 2 × Wright GR-1820-F11 Cyclone 9 cylinder air-cooled radial engines 650 hp (480 kW) to 670 hp (500 kW)
- Propellers: 3-bladed Hamilton Standard metal variable-pitch propellers, 12 ft 0 in (3.66 m) diameter

Performance

- Maximum speed: 170 mph (270 km/h, 150 kn)
- Cruise speed: 145 mph (233 km/h, 126 kn)
- Stall speed: 59 mph (95 km/h, 51 kn)
- Range: 580 mi (930 km, 500 nmi)
- Endurance: 4 hours
- Service ceiling: 15,500 ft (4,700 m)
- Rate of climb: 850 ft/min (4.3 m/s) first minute, from sea level
- Fuel consumption: 70 US gal (260 L; 58 imp gal) per hour

== See also ==
Related lists

- List of military aircraft of the United States
- List of United States Navy aircraft designations (pre-1962)

== Sources ==
- Andrade, John M. USMilitary Aircraft Designations and Serials since 1909. Earl Shilton, Leicester, UK: Midland Counties Publications, 1979. ISBN 0-904597-22-9. (Page 63 and 214)
- Bowers, Peter M. Curtiss Aircraft 1907–1947. London: Putnam & CompanyLtd., 1979. ISBN 0-370-10029-8.
- Hagedorn, Dan (March–May 1992). "Curtiss Types in Latin America". Air Enthusiast. No. 45. pp. 61–77. ISSN 0143-5450.
- Taylor, H.A. (March–June 1978). ""The Uncompetitive Condor"". Air Enthusiast. No. 6. Bromley, Kent, UK: Pilot Press Ltd. pp. 94–110.
- The Illustrated Encyclopedia of Aircraft (Part Work 1982–1985). Orbis Publishing, 1985.
