= Heinrich Kubis =

First flight attendant (1888–1979)

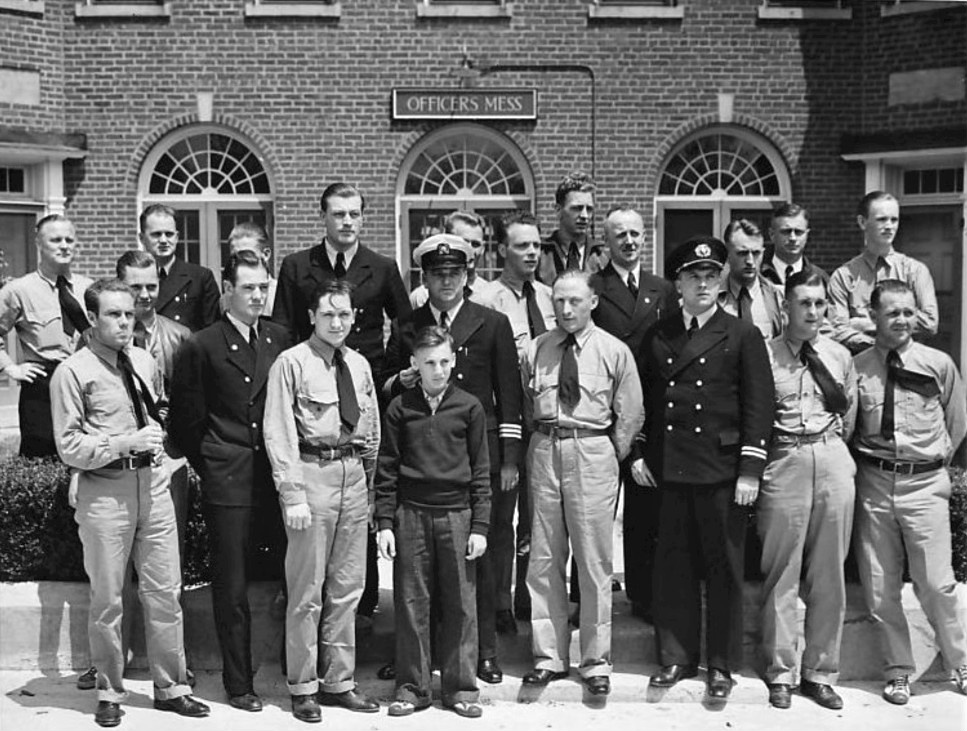
Heinrich Kubis (back row, fourth from right), pictured with other survivors of the Hindenburg

Heinrich Kubis (16 June 1888 – 1979) was a German professional waiter known for serving as the world's first flight attendant and for surviving the Hindenburg disaster.

== Career ==
Kubis trained as a waiter and worked in several luxury hotels in Europe, including the Hôtel Ritz Paris and the Carlton Hotel, London.

In March 1912, Kubis began attending to passengers on the LZ 10 Schwaben during flights from Berlin to Friedrichshafen. He thereby preceded the debut of the first female flight attendant, Ellen Church, by eighteen years. He survived the destruction of the Schwaben near Düsseldorf on 28 June 1912.

Kubis was on the Hindenburg at the time of its destruction in New Jersey in 1937. On the Hindenburg Kubis was not only a flight attendant but the manager of the entire waitstaff, overseeing fifteen cooks and waiters. He was responsible for confiscating cigarette lighters and matches from passengers as they boarded the aircraft, stating, "We Germans don't fool around with hydrogen." Kubis had nearly missed the voyage due to illness, but recovered in time to make the flight on 3 May. Kubis was in the dining room at the moment of the explosion, and helped passengers to jump to safety. He himself escaped the disaster without injury.

He died in 1979.

== In popular culture ==
Kubis has figured in fictional works about the Hindeburg disaster: The Hindeburg Murders by Max Allan Collins (2000), and Flight of Dreams by Ariel Lawhon (2016). In the film Hindenburg: The Untold Story he was portrayed by actor Thorston Manderlay.
