= Emergency aircraft evacuation =

Emergency evacuation of an aircraft

Emergency aircraft evacuation refers to emergency evacuation from an aircraft which may take place on the ground, in water, or mid-flight. There are standard evacuation procedures and special evacuation equipment.

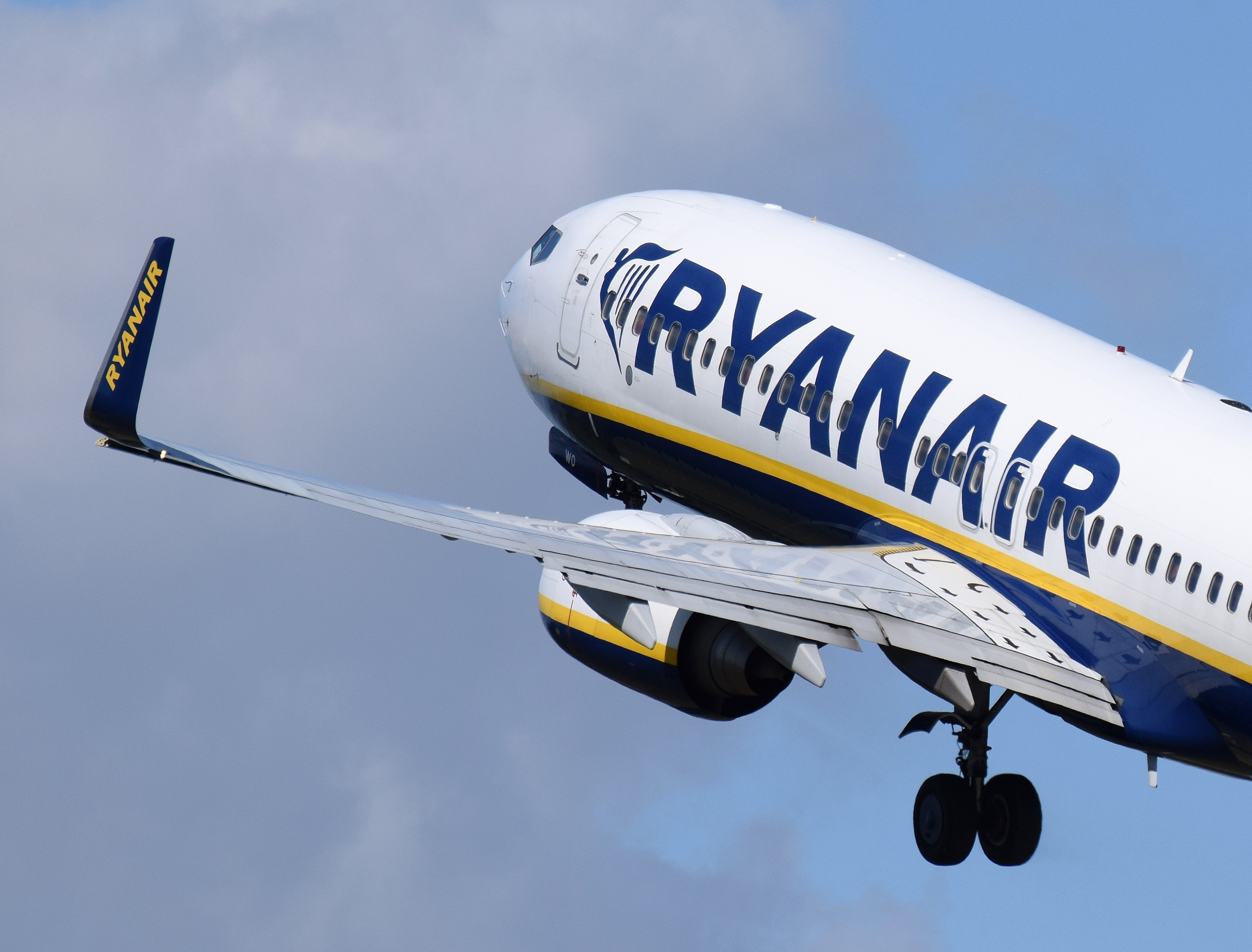
Ryanair Boeing 737-800 take off, showing the two overwing emergency evacuation doors

== Commercial airplanes ==
Commercial aircraft are equipped with aircraft safety cards detailing evacuation procedures. These include locating and using emergency exits, using slides and flotation devices for water landings, etc.

Airliners are certified for a full evacuation within 90 seconds, but evacuation tests can be theoretical as real passengers may be older and in more overweight conditions. Around 30 evacuation events occurs each year around the world, with a very high overall level of safety as observed by the FAA. In 2016, an Emirates 777-300 caught fire in Dubai but evacuation took 6min 40s while it was only 77% full, as half of the passengers surveyed admitted to retrieving hand luggage. EASA is avoiding automatically locking overhead bins, as it could lead to even greater delays with frustrated passengers.

An evacuation is more urgent than a "rapid disembarkation", which entails using the aircraft's ordinary exits while leaving luggage behind. A 2017 incident at Cork Airport saw passengers use the overwing doors and slides after misinterpreting the captain's rapid disembarkation instruction as an emergency evacuation instruction.

== Ejection seats ==
In aircraft, an ejection seat is a system designed to rescue the pilot or other crew of an aircraft (usually military) in an emergency. In most designs, the seat is propelled out of the aircraft by an explosive charge or rocket motor, carrying the pilot with it. The concept of an ejectable escape capsule has also been tried. Once clear of the aircraft, the ejection seat deploys a parachute.

== Parachutes ==
Parachutes are designed to allow people to exit aircraft mid-flight and safely land on the ground by creating drag to slow descent.

== See also ==
- Air safety
