= Emergency escape =

Emergency escape can refer to:

- Fire escapes in buildings
- Emergency exits in vehicles
