= Aircraft safety card =

Aircraft document for emergency procedures

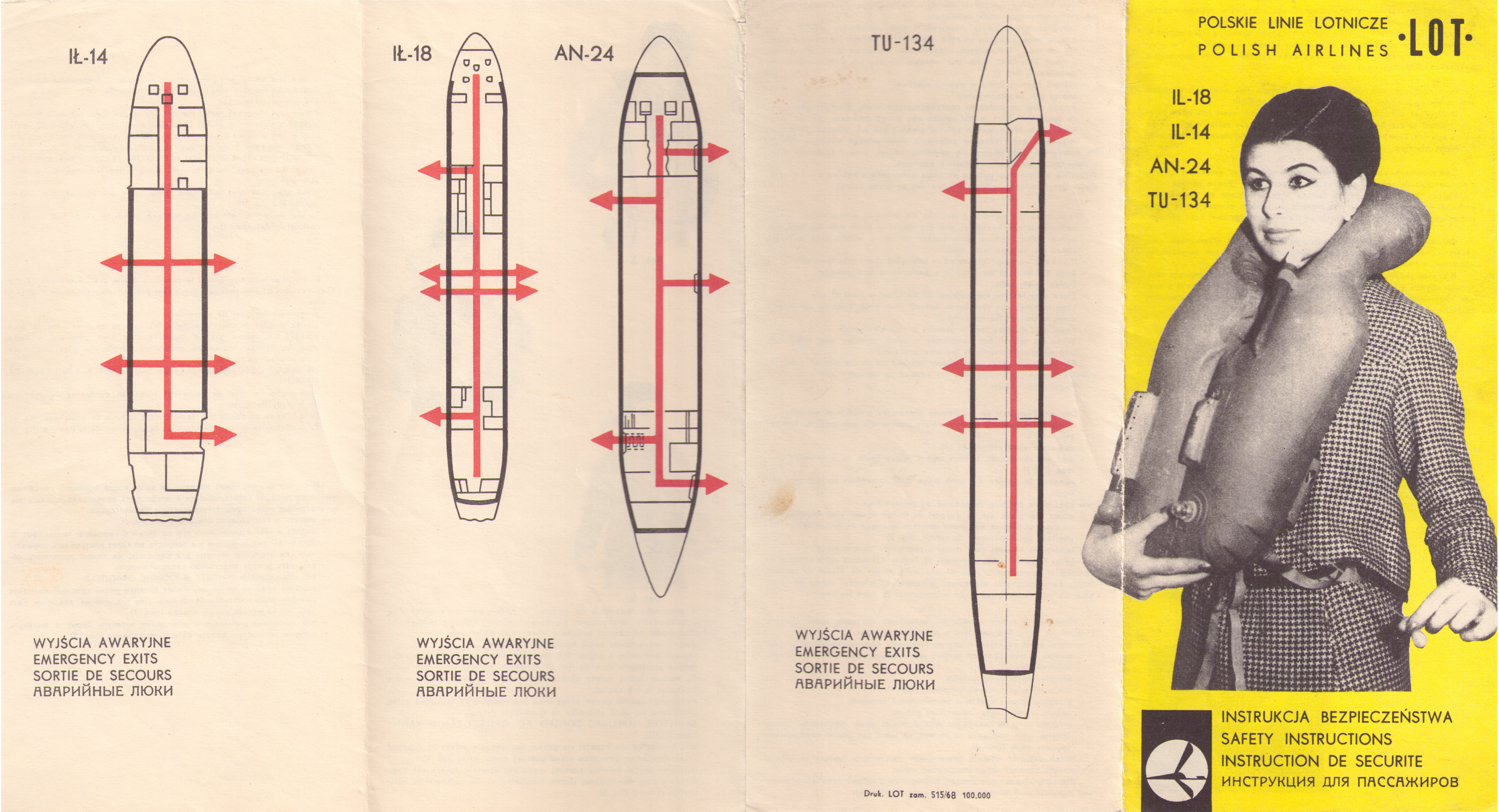
A LOT Polish Airlines safety instruction card from 1968 for the Ilyushin Il-18, Ilyushin Il-14, Antonov An-24 and Tupolev Tu-134.

An aircraft safety card is a document instructing passengers on an aircraft about the procedures for dealing with various emergency conditions that might arise during the flight. The safety card provides passenger instructions that are specific to the model of the airplane in which they are found and demonstrate such procedures as the proper use of the seat belts, bracing for an emergency landing, the use of the oxygen mask, opening the emergency exit doors and the use of over-water gear such as flotation cushions, life vests, and life rafts.

== General information ==
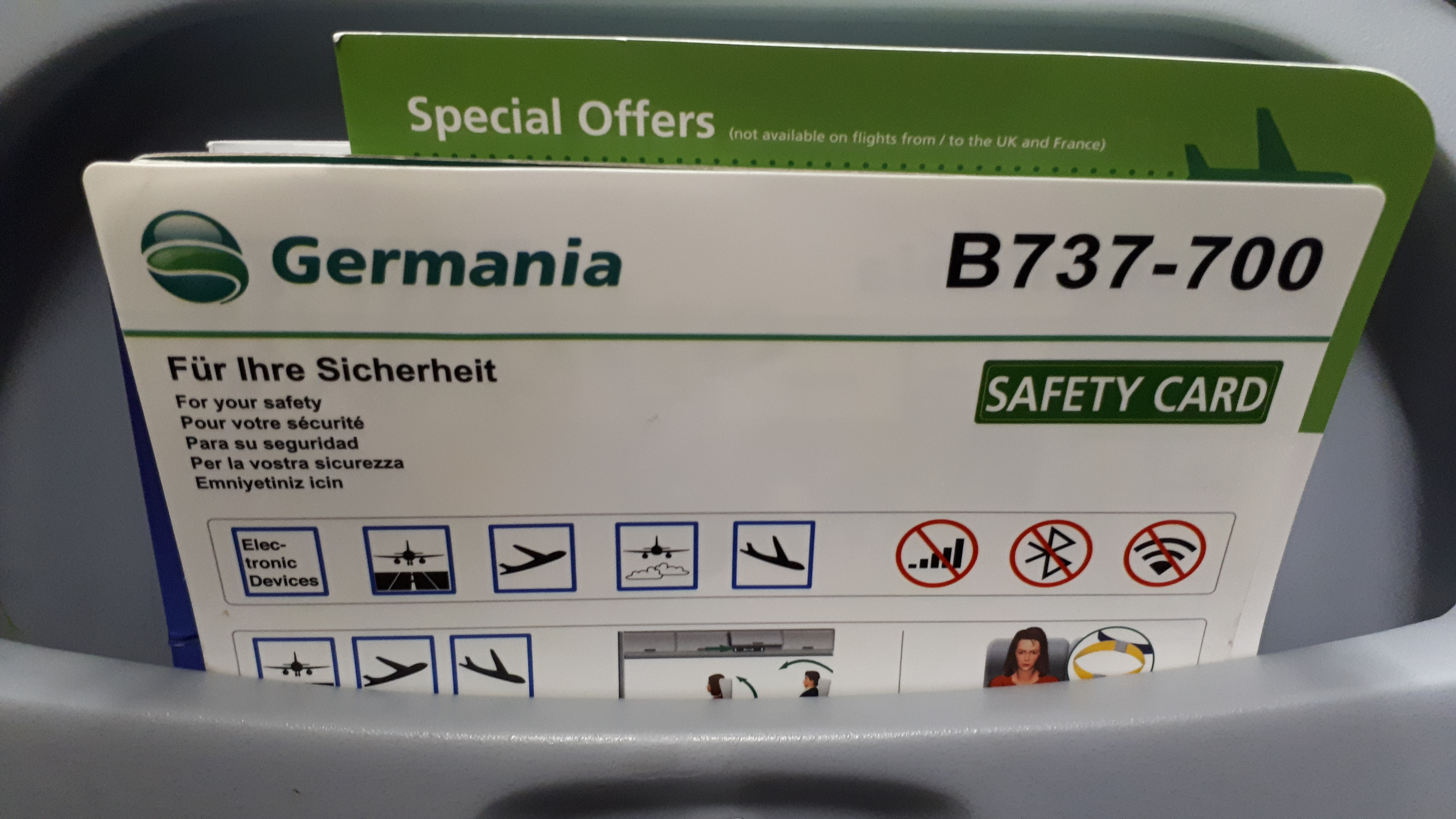
A Germania Airlines safety instruction card for the Boeing 737.

The safety cards are required by airlines on all commercial flights, and are usually located in the seat pocket in front of each passenger, and occasionally on a placard on the back of seats. The safety card provides much more information than passengers receive in the oral pre-flight briefing. Because of that pre-flight safety demonstrations, either conducted by the flight attendants or through a video presentation, most often instruct passengers to familiarize themselves with the safety cards.

Safety card instructions are typically in the form of illustrated pictures not only to help overcome literacy and language issues, but because graphic images are understood better, retained longer in memory, and are preferred over text.

The cards are sometimes laminated or made of plastic, however, this is discouraged because, in the event of a cabin fire, burning plastics increase the toxins in the cabin. Braille cards are also offered on many mainstream airlines.

== Collectibles ==
Aircraft safety cards are also a collectible item among the aviation enthusiast community since they are a reflection of an airline, an aircraft type, a culture, and a historical period. Safety cards are collected from civil and military aircraft, rare cards have been known to fetch over US$1,000 at auction.

== See also ==
- Emergency aircraft evacuation
- Inflight magazine
- Sickness bag
