= Vahid Motevalli =

Vahid Motevalli is the Vice Chancellor for Academic Affairs since January 2026 at Penn State Harrisburg and served as interim from July 2023 in this same role. He joined Penn State Harrisburg as director of the School of Science, Engineering, and Technology in August of 2021. From January 2023 until August 2023, he concurrently served as interim Associate Vice Chancellor for Research. Prior to joining Penn State, he was Associate Dean of Engineering for Research and Innovation and Professor of Mechanical Engineering at the Tennessee Technological University in Cookeville, Tennessee. In his role, he was responsible for overall research activities of the college including two centers of excellence, Center for Manufacturing Research (CMR) and Center for Energy Systems Research (CESR) as well as coordination of graduate student funding, research strategies, research infrastructure and providing advice and administration of all research related functions. In addition, he was providing support and launching initiatives to grow innovation and entrepreneurship programs within the college and university.

== Biography ==
Prior to coming to TTU, Motevelli founded the Center for Technology Development at Purdue University (2011), led the EcoCar 2 (2011-2013) project at Purdue and served the Head of Mechanical Engineering Technology Department (2009-2012) at Purdue University.

In August 2008, Dr. Motevalli accepted to serve as Professor of Engineering and Associate Provost for Graduate Studies and Research of the Dubai Aerospace Enterprise University after having served during 2007–08 academic year in that position in a Consulting role. Upon closure of DAEU, he spend a year on a leave for educational purposes from the George Washington University where he had been director of the Aviation Institute from 2004 to 2008, co-director of the institute (2002–04) and Director of the Aviation Safety and Security Certificate Program from 1998 to 2008.

He has been teaching, conducting research and has administrative experience in academic, government and industry with diverse experience in combustion, fire safety, aviation safety and security and transportation safety since 1983. His professional experience outside the academia includes working at National and government laboratories (NIST, NRL), government (US Congress as ASME Congressional Fellow) and consulting. Most recently, he directed the International Aviation Safety and Security Summit program (2001–2005), which developed a leadership program for ministers and Directors General of civil aviation for more than 100 countries of the world. This program was funded by FAA and supported by the DOT Secretary's office. The program focus was on providing executive level training and technical information and assistance to ministerial level officials, Director Generals of civil aviation and other foreign government officials on oversight responsibilities and requirements in aviation safety and security based on the International Civil Aviation Organization (ICAO) Standards and Recommended Practices. As Project Director, Dr. Motevalli worked with US and Foreign government officials, Department of State, TSA and aviation industry.

Several years of directing the aviation safety and security program has enabled him to study a number of issues in aviation safety and security both in the US and abroad. His broad knowledge of the issues in aviation particularly relates to cabin safety, uncontained engine failures, government oversight issues, aviation security challenges and emerging threats. He also worked closely with the Gore Commission (President's Commission on Aviation Safety and Security in 21st Century) staff in 1996–97. He has published papers on the various aspects of aviation safety and security. He has been interviewed by US and international media on aviation safety and security as well as automotive technologies numerous times.

Dr. Motevalli has participated in a number of consulting projects related to aviation including Business Process Re-Engineering for the Ethiopian Enterprise, development of civil aviation laws and regulations for Afghanistan, advising Department of Homeland Security on aviation security issues, international aviation security training quality assurance and a number of other projects in aviation, transportation and fire safety.

Prior to his position at GW, Prof. Motevalli was a tenured faculty of Mechanical Engineering Department at the Worcester Polytechnic Institute in 1994. His research has included aircraft evacuation, injury evaluation, emerging aviation safety and security issues, Finite Element modeling of aircraft engine containment simulation, aircraft cabin safety, aircraft finite element modeling, aviation safety oversight standards, hybrid-electric vehicle research with emphasis on safety of fuel cell, fuel reformers, alternative fuel use and evaluation of airbag models. He has over 100 technical publications in addition to reports, presentations and invited talks and has directed over 35 graduate students and a large number of undergraduate students in a variety of topic areas. Dr. Motevalli has conducted sponsored research and training programs exceeding $13 million since 1988.

He was appointed Department Head of MET at Purdue University in September 2009.

He officially became director of SSET at Penn State on Aug. 16, 2021.

== Academic Record ==
- Ph.D. Mechanical Engineering, 1989, University of Maryland, College Park, "A Study of the Characteristics of Small-Scale, Unconfined Fire-Induced Ceiling Jets",
- M.S. Mechanical Engineering, 1985, University of Maryland, College Park, "Effect of Variation of Combustor Geometry on Combustion Performance",
- B.S. Mechanical Engineering, 1983, University of Maryland, College Park.
