= Pre-flight safety demonstration =

Safety demonstration given to airline passengers before takeoff

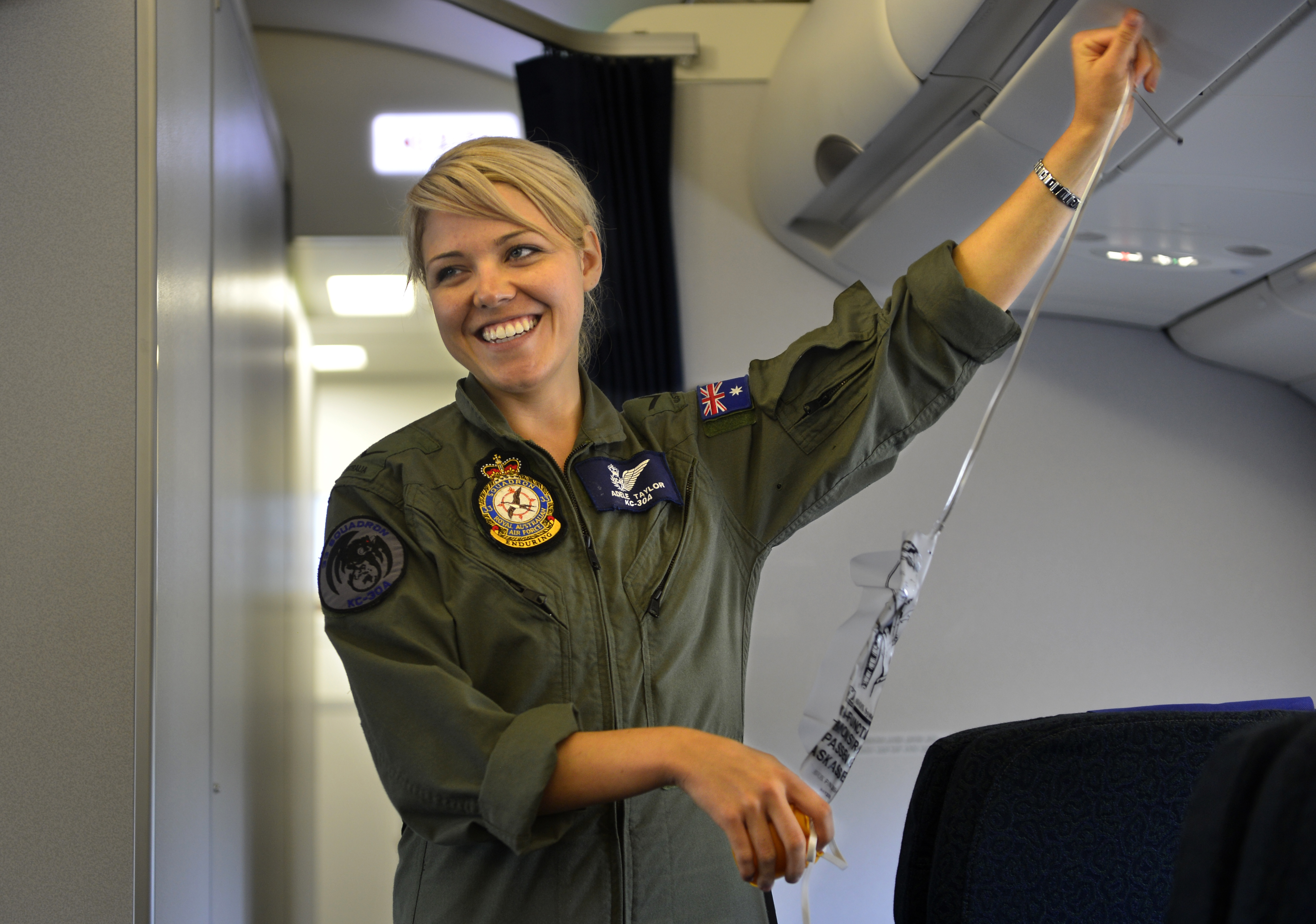
A Royal Australian Air Force leading aircraftswoman demonstrating the use of an oxygen mask aboard an Australian Airbus A330 MRTT

A pre-flight safety demonstration (also called a pre-flight safety briefing or safety video) is an explanation given to airline passengers before takeoff outlining the aircraft’s safety features and emergency procedures.

Aviation regulations generally require that passengers be orally briefed before departure but do not prescribe how the information must be delivered. Airlines therefore present the briefing either as a live demonstration by flight attendants or as a pre-recorded audio or video presentation shown through the aircraft's in-flight entertainment system. Briefings typically last several minutes and pre-recorded videos may include subtitles, sign language, or multiple languages.

Beginning in the 2000s, some airlines have produced stylized or humorous safety videos featuring celebrities, popular music, or cinematic themes, many of which gained wide circulation online. For example, Cebu Pacific staged a choreographed demonstration set to Lady Gaga's "Just Dance" and Katy Perry's "California Gurls". A 2008 Delta Air Lines video led to the internet nickname "Deltalina" for one of its featured flight attendants. A later British Airways video featured performers including Rowan Atkinson, Gordon Ramsay, and Gillian Anderson in support of Comic Relief.

== Required elements ==
ICAO Doc 10086 recommends safety briefings should be given in English and the language of the operator. In addition, the operator may consider use of the official language of the states of departure and destination, as well as any other language appropriate to the passengers on board. Some aircraft have pre-recorded briefings in multiple languages to facilitate this. English is not mandatory, and the operator will choose the most appropriate language(s) to be used on its flights. This may vary from flight to flight.

There is no ICAO or EU requirement that cabin crew speak English.

Airlines are required to orally brief their passengers before each take-off. This requirement is set by their nation's civil aviation authority, under the recommendation of the International Civil Aviation Organization. All airline safety videos are subtitled or shown secondarily in English as it is the lingua franca of aviation. Sometimes a video briefing is subtitled with the primary language of the country the airline is based in or the language of the city where the plane originates or flies to. This is up to the airline, but most (if not all) elect to do this through a safety briefing or demonstration delivered to all passengers at the same time. A safety demonstration typically covers all these aspects, not necessarily in this order:

- the brace position, which must be adopted on hearing the "Brace, Brace" command during an emergency landing (sometimes called the safety position; this is not required in the United States and certain other countries and is mostly included in European regions)
- the use of the seat belt; fastening a seat belt is strictly required during taxiing, take-off, landing, and during flight in known turbulence areas, but most airlines recommend or require that passengers keep their seat belt fastened at all times in case of unexpected turbulence
- the location and use of the emergency exits, evacuation slides and emergency floor level lighting
  - a diagram or description of the location of exits on that particular aircraft, or that they are being pointed out by crew and are described in the safety card
  - a reminder that all passengers should locate (and sometimes count the number of rows to) their nearest exit, which may be behind them
- the requirements for sitting in an emergency exit row (varies by country and airline); in some countries (including the United States) it must also be stated that exit row passengers may be required to assist the crew in an evacuation
- that all passengers must leave all carry-on bags behind during an evacuation; the purpose of this instruction is to facilitate fast evacuation
  - some demonstrations also mention that high heeled shoes and/or any sharp objects must be removed (this is to ensure that evacuation slides are not punctured)
- the use of the oxygen mask (not included on some turboprops which do not fly high enough to need supplemental oxygen in a decompression emergency) with associated reminders:
  - that the passenger should always fit their own mask on before helping others, in order to avoid fainting before everyone's mask is on;
  - that even though oxygen will be flowing to the mask, the plastic bag may not inflate; some planes such as the Boeing 787 or Boeing 777-300ER do not include plastic bags in the oxygen masks.
  - if applicable to the aircraft in question, that the passenger must pull down on a strap to retrieve the mask
  - this part of the safety demonstration is sometimes technically permitted to be done after take-off, since it is not applicable while the aircraft is at low altitude
- the location and use of the life vests, life rafts and other flotation devices, like floatable seat cushions (not always included if the flight does not overfly or fly near vast masses of water although is required by the FAA on any aircraft equipped with life vests)
  - a reminder that the life vests should only be inflated after leaving the plane; this is to facilitate fast evacuation and also to prevent people from floating in a submerged plane which will prevent them from reaching the doors (several passengers died this way in the crash of Ethiopian Airlines Flight 961)
- restrictions enforced by law and/or airline policies, which typically include
  - requirements that passengers must comply with lighted signs, posted placards, and crew members instructions (generally only included in safety demonstrations on Australian, New Zealand, and American carriers as the CASA (AU), CAA (NZ) and FAA (US) require it to be stated)
  - that smoking, including the use of e-cigarettes and smokeless tobacco, is not allowed on board, including in the lavatories
    - on flights where smoking was permitted, a reminder was often issued that smoking was only acceptable in smoking sections, but not when the no-smoking sign was illuminated nor anywhere else on board; another reminder warned that in case of deployment of the oxygen masks, any lit cigarettes must be extinguished; airlines which prohibited smoking on all their flights usually reminded passengers of such carrier-wide restriction; smoking was banned on all flights under US FAA jurisdiction in 2000
  - that law prohibits tampering with, disabling or destroying lavatory smoke detectors (italicized wording required verbatim by the FAA (US), other regulatory bodies require similar warnings).
  - that the use of mobile phones is not allowed during flight, unless placed in "airplane mode" or the wireless capability is turned off, unless the aircraft has cellular connection and/or Wi-Fi
  - that laptops and other electronics may only be used once the aircraft is at cruising altitude or the captain turns off the fasten seat-belt signs
    - some airlines may require passengers to also turn off all devices during taxi, take-off, and landing (such as Kenya Airways, Air Austral, and Ethiopian Airlines) (As of July 1, 2023, Malaysia Airlines no longer requires passengers to switch off their electronic devices for takeoff and landing as Gate to Gate Connectivity has been installed on their new Boeing 737s) in addition to having these devices set to airplane mode
    - if present, most airlines may also require passengers to unplug these devices from charging ports during these times
    - some newer aircraft have separate "please turn off electronic devices" signs in place of the now unnecessary "no smoking" signs (as smoking is never allowed anyway) and that electronics should be completely shut off and put away when these signs are illuminated
    - If the passenger loses an electronic device under a seat, the passenger should not attempt to move the seat as this may damage the device or injure the passenger; the passenger should instead notify the flight attendants to locate the device safely
- actions required of passengers prior to takeoff (sometimes referred to as "final cabin check" and often accompanied with a physical check by crew):
  - a reminder that seat belts are securely fastened and that all aisles, bulkheads and emergency exit rows must remain clear at all times
  - that seatbacks and tray tables should be in their upright and locked position, leg- or footrest put away in premium cabins, headrests must be down and unfolded on select airlines (such as United Airlines, Hawaiian Airlines, and KLM), and carry-on luggage stowed in the overhead locker or underneath a seat prior to takeoff; the purpose of all these instructions is to facilitate faster evacuation in case of emergency
  - that stowable video screens must be put away once the safety video is done
  - in most cases, if seated next to a window, the window blinds must be raised for take off and landing. The reason is that in case of emergency during take-off or landing, the eyes of the passengers will already be used to the day or night light outside, and they will be able to react more quickly. It also allows faster detection of troubles in the wings and engines. Windows must be closed however on flights departing Chinese military airports.
    - this is not necessary to include on aircraft without window shades, typically on aircraft such as the Boeing 787 Dreamliner
- to review the safety information card prior to takeoff or to follow along during the demonstration/video

== History ==
After the 1928 KLM Fokker F.III Waalhaven crash in July 1928, it was suggested that it would be a good idea to tell passengers before a flight where the emergency exit is located. In that accident, the passengers did not know the location of the emergency exit in the ceiling of the aircraft and all would have survived when having used the emergency exit.

=== Video briefings ===
In the United States, the approval for using video for pre-flight safety demonstrations was originally included in FAA Advisory Circular 135-12, released on October 9, 1984. This is further explained in FAA Advisory Circular 121-24C, which stated that video offered several advantages over the standard manual demonstration, but only provided that the airliner has the required video and sound systems to exhibit the video properly.

As in-flight video entertainment systems were beginning to see mainstream introduction, airlines began producing safety demonstration videos to be used in lieu of or in tandem with a manual demonstration performed by one or more flight attendants. Notable examples include Trans World Airlines, Pan Am, and Northwest.

Early videos from the late 1980s omit warnings about electronic devices, as it was less of a concern at the time. Since smoking was still acceptable on many airliners, these videos feature antiquated reminders about smoking on board, including acceptable locations to do so and a command to stop smoking should the oxygen masks be deployed.

Videos of this era often use 2-dimensional animation or very primitive 3D computer generated imagery to illustrate elements of the demonstration. While animation is usually used sparingly, some videos are fully animated (usually in 3D), such as ATA's circa-1994 safety video.

When videos of this time were captioned, it was usually only captioned in the language already being spoken on the audio track. Bilingual videos typically had the primary language's instructions repeated verbally immediately afterward, but almost never had the secondary language captioned.

Arguably, elements of the demonstration were either overexplained, underexplained, or poorly described during this time. For instance, TWA's safety video mentioned a "slight burning odor" when oxygen masks are in use. Most demonstrations were also lacking in their explanation of electronic device policies as portable electronic devices were only beginning to become a concern.

Videos were typically designated to a specific model of aircraft but shared certain assets between videos produced by the same airline, including film recorded on a completely different aircraft. This practice continues to the modern day, although it is variably less prevalent than during the 1980s and 1990s.

=== Late 1990s to present ===
By this point, airlines had found a refined format for their safety videos. Most videos, though produced differently, kept the same basic script with the same points. For instance, the Delta Air Lines safety video from 2000 and 2001 quoted one of their early '90s videos almost verbatim for most of the runtime.

Electronic device policies were also updated to include that cellular phones and other radio-based electronics are not permitted to be used at any time while other devices may be used in-flight but must be shut off for takeoff and landing. Briefings were changed in 2013 after the FAA allowed the usage of small portable electronic devices, as long as they aren't connected to cellular networks, throughout the duration of a flight and only larger ones have to be stowed during takeoff and landing.

== Effectiveness ==
Humor or deviation from standardization in safety briefings has drawn critique by some aviation experts. Research conducted at the University of New South Wales in Australia questions the effectiveness of these briefings in conveying key safety messages for passengers to recall and act upon in an emergency. In one study, a range of pre-recorded safety briefings were tested. One safety briefing contained humor, another was void of humor (said to reflect a standard style briefing), and another used a celebrity to sell the importance of the safety briefing and the messages contained within. Not long after being exposed to the briefing, individuals recalled approximately 50% of the key safety messages from the briefing featuring the celebrity, 45% from the briefing containing humor, and 32% from the briefing void of both a celebrity and humor. Two hours post exposure to the pre-flight safety briefings, recall decreased on average by 4% from the original levels across all conditions.
