= Exit row =

Seats next to an exit on an airliner

An exit row seat

An exit row is a row of seats on board a commercial airliner that is next to an emergency exit. Exit rows may be next to overwing exits or full-sized exit doors.

== Passenger criteria ==
Since passengers seated in an exit row must be able and willing to assist the crew during an evacuation of the aircraft, civil aviation boards and national governments set specific requirements for passengers seated in an exit row. While exact requirements vary by country and airline, frequently exit row passengers must:

- Be of a certain minimum age, ranging from 12 to 18 depending on the airline's policies and/or local law.
- Not be traveling with anyone requiring special assistance in an emergency (such as an infant or person with a disability), or an animal (including service animals)
- Have no physical or mental impairment that would hinder quickly reaching and operating the emergency exit.
- Speak and read the national language of the airline's home country (e.g. English on Qantas or German on Lufthansa, etc.)
- Not use a seatbelt extension.
- Be able to lift 27 kg/60 lb (for window exits only).

Some carriers require passengers with an exit row seat assignment to check in with an agent (as opposed to online or at a kiosk), who will manually verify eligibility and issue a boarding pass.

== Comfort and premium factor ==
Most exit row seats provide a few more inches of seat pitch compared to non-exit row seats so that passengers have more space to access the exit. Seats one row in front of an exit row usually are not able to recline, which can limit their comfort on longer flights. Nonetheless, airlines have taken advantage of this extra space by reserving exit row seats for frequent fliers or charging fees for booking them. A few airlines have gone to branding exit row seats as a premium economy product—on Virgin America's A320, the exit rows (as well as bulkhead seats) are considered "Main Cabin Select" where meals, alcohol, pay-per-view movies and a higher baggage allowance are all included. Main Cabin Select is sold as a separate class of service between coach and first class, and a restrictive MCS fare tends to be equivalent to a full-fare economy ticket. Similarly, JetBlue uses the exit rows as part of their "Even More Space" section.

== Kinds of exit rows ==
Typically, there are two kinds of exit rows in which passengers may be seated. There is the exit row next to overwing exits which are typically not attended to by flight attendants and require passengers to operate them in the event of an emergency. The second type of exit row is next to a full-sized exit door and a flight attendant is seated in these rows. The flight attendant typically sits on a jumpseat.
