= Evacuation slide =

Inflatable slide for emergency aircraft evacuation

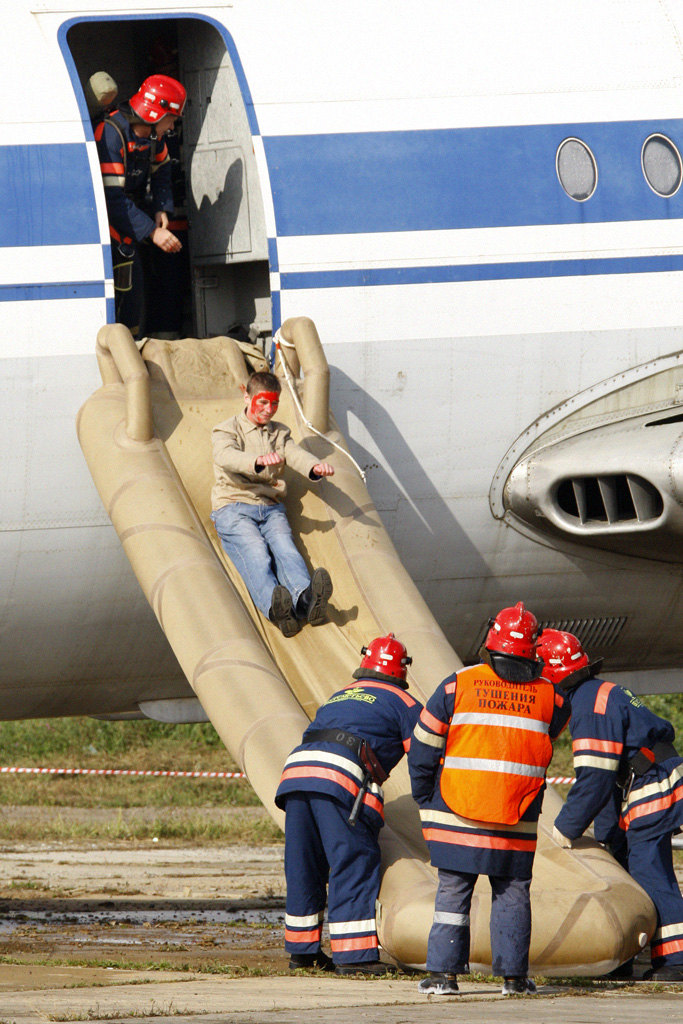
Evacuation slide used in an emergency drill

An evacuation slide is an inflatable slide used to evacuate an aircraft quickly. An escape slide is required on all commercial aircraft where the door sill height is such that, in the event of an evacuation, passengers would be unable to step down from the door uninjured (Federal Aviation Administration requires slides on all aircraft doors where the floor is 6 feet (1.8 m) or more above the ground).

Escape slides are packed and held within the door structure inside the slide bustle, a protruding part of the inside of an aircraft door that varies with aircraft size, door size and door location. In many modern planes, to reduce evacuation time, evacuation slides deploy automatically when a door is opened in an "armed" condition. Modern planes often indicate an armed condition with an indicator light.

== Regulations ==
Federal Aviation Administration and EASA regulations require an approved method of escape on all aircraft exits where the floor is 6 feet (1.8 m) or more above the ground). There are also design requirements for passengers to be able to evacuate within certain time limits; typically 90 seconds for large aircraft. An evacuation slide is an inflatable slide that both allows people to descend safely from the exit and has a sufficiently high use rate to meet the evacuation timings. Escape slides are the reference means of compliance with the regulation although some cargo aircraft use different methods.

== History ==
The first aircraft evacuation slide was developed and produced by Air Cruisers, founded by James F. Boyle, inventor of the World War II life vest, the "Mae West". The patent for the inflatable escape chute assembly was submitted by Boyle in 1954 and the designs was patented in 1956 under patent number 2,765,131. Today Air Cruisers is part of Zodiac Aerospace and ultimately owned by Safran, who is the world's largest provider of evacuation slides. Prior to inflatables, some passenger aircraft utilized canvas-type slides which required the crew to undertake an extensive rigging procedure. Canvas type slides are still found on some out of production Russian aircraft.

In 1965 the idea was further developed by combining the inflatable slide with an integrated raft. Previously, life rafts were carried separately in the cabin and deployed manually by the crew after a water landing. The new slide/raft design was put forward to the International Air Transport Association (IATA), by Jack Grant, Qantas operations safety superintendent.

== Types ==
There are four types of inflatable aircraft evacuation aid covered by EASA Technical Order:

Type I	Inflatable Slide
Type II	Inflatable Slide/Raft
Type III	Inflatable Exit Ramp
Type IV	Inflatable Exit Ramp/Slide

Type I Slides and Type II Slide/Rafts both function the same on land allowing descent from the door to the ground. A slide/raft also functions as a life raft in a landing on water and therefore are required to include sea survival specific features such as; an erectable canopy, righting aids and survival packs containing items such as leak stoppers, paddles and flares. Even where only a Type I slide is fitted it has sufficient buoyancy to act as an aid in the event of a water landing.

A Type III inflatable ramp is a small platform that may be fitted to allow easy access from, for example, an over-wing exit door to an area of structure from where descent can be achieved either by a separate slide or by jumping, depending on the height.

Type IV combines the ramp and slide into a single functional unit. The over-wing exits on the Airbus A320 series, Airbus A380, Boeing 747, Boeing 757, Boeing 767 and Boeing 777 aircraft use ramp slides in various configurations.

Slides can be single or dual lane, depending on the width of the exit they are fitted to and in testing must show a nominal exit rate of 70 people per minute per lane. A dual lane slide is one that is capable of carrying two parallel lines of evacuees and is typically used at the main doors on widebody aircraft. Slides and slide/rafts can be detached from the aircraft. This may, for example, involve lifting up the flap on the girt bar, and pulling the detach handle. These procedures are usually placarded red on the slide, "For Ditching Use Only". Once the slide is separated, the slide remains attached to the aircraft by a mooring line. This line will break if the airframe submerges or can be disconnected with disconnect handle or a supplied knife.

Another unique type of evacuation slide is found on the DC-9 family of aircraft and its successors the MD-80 and Boeing 717. This type of slide is in the aircraft's tailcone, and deploys after the tailcone is jettisoned, allowing for evacuation through the rear of the airframe. The procedure to use this exit may involve removing a plug-type pressure bulkhead, or a swing type door that leads directly to a walkway. At the end of the walkway is the slide pack and a manual tailcone jettison handle for use if the tailcone has not already been automatically jettisoned by opening the walkway entrance.

One of the newest developments in evacuation slide technology can be found on the Airbus A380, which was developed by Goodrich Aircraft Interior Products. Certain slides on board the aircraft have the Tribrid Inflation System, which is connected to a sensing system within the door. If the door is opened in emergency mode at an abnormal attitude (e.g. nose up position due to the loss of landing gear), the slide will inflate normally but will also inflate several feet of additional slide to ensure the slide reaches the ground. This contrasts with the Boeing 747 as doors found on that aircraft have no such system; should the slide not reach the ground, the doors must be blocked to prevent passenger injury.

== Main door exits ==
Slides fitted by main fuselage doors are mounted on the door itself. This packaging is normally inside in a slide bustle, a protruding part on the inside of an aircraft door that varies with aircraft size, door size and door location. At wide doors typical on large aircraft these will be "dual lane" slides capable of carrying two parallel lines of evacuees. To reduce evacuation time, evacuation slides deploy automatically when a door is opened in an "armed" condition. Various forms of indicators, such as lights, flags and pins with ribbons are used to indicate an armed condition.

== Over-wing / window exits ==
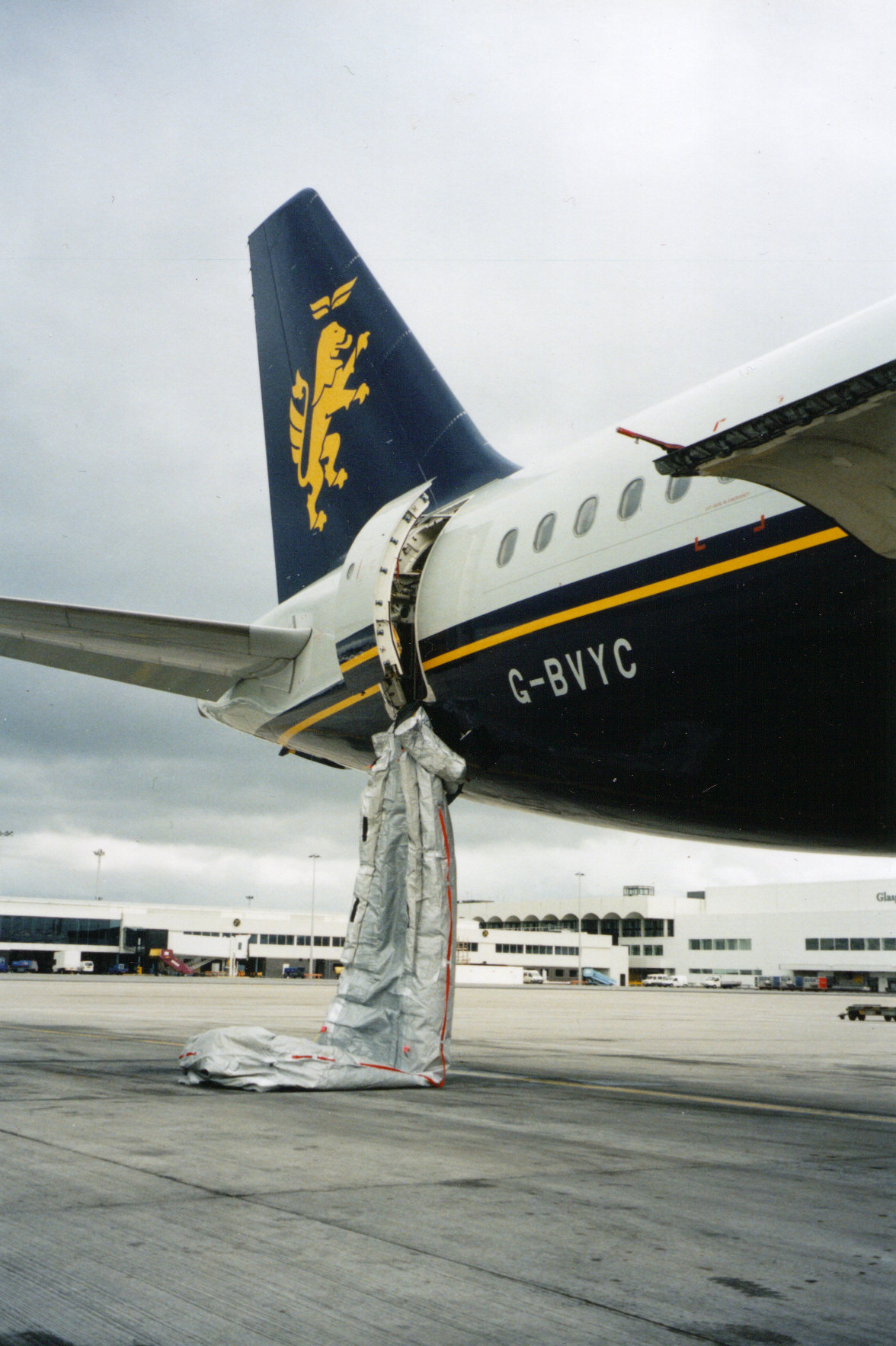
Deflated evacuation slide on an Airbus A320 following an inadvertent deployment, 2007

All large commercial aircraft have escape slides on the main doors but some also have slides for exits over the wings. These include the Boeing 767, Boeing 757, and Airbus A320-series aircraft. Typically, over-wing evacuation slides are not designed for use in ditching situations as they cannot be detached and will not operate, as the system is disabled by the aspirators on the slide taking in water. Aircraft where there is no over-wing slide, such as the Embraer 190, 717, and 737 do not require them by regulation because when the flaps are fully lowered, they are low enough to the ground to meet the requirement.

Window exits usually come in two configurations:

- An unhinged hatch type exit, where the hatch is unlocked from the inside and pulled into the cabin, whereupon it can be disposed. Some carriers recommend placing the hatch onto the adjacent seats, while others may recommend dropping it in the next seat row, or rotating the exit and throwing it outside the aircraft as far forward as possible. A manual inflation handle for the evacuation slide, if equipped, can be found in the window frame. Most aircraft overwing exits are of this type.
- A hinged self-disposing exit hatch, that opens automatically outward using a spring when the exit handle is pulled. This design is currently found only on Boeing 737 NG and A320neo family aircraft.

Window exits are usually equipped with ditching or life lines. These may be attached to the inside frame of the window exit, or located in a nearby storage locker. One end has a buckle to connect to attachments on the aircraft's wings.

== Operation ==
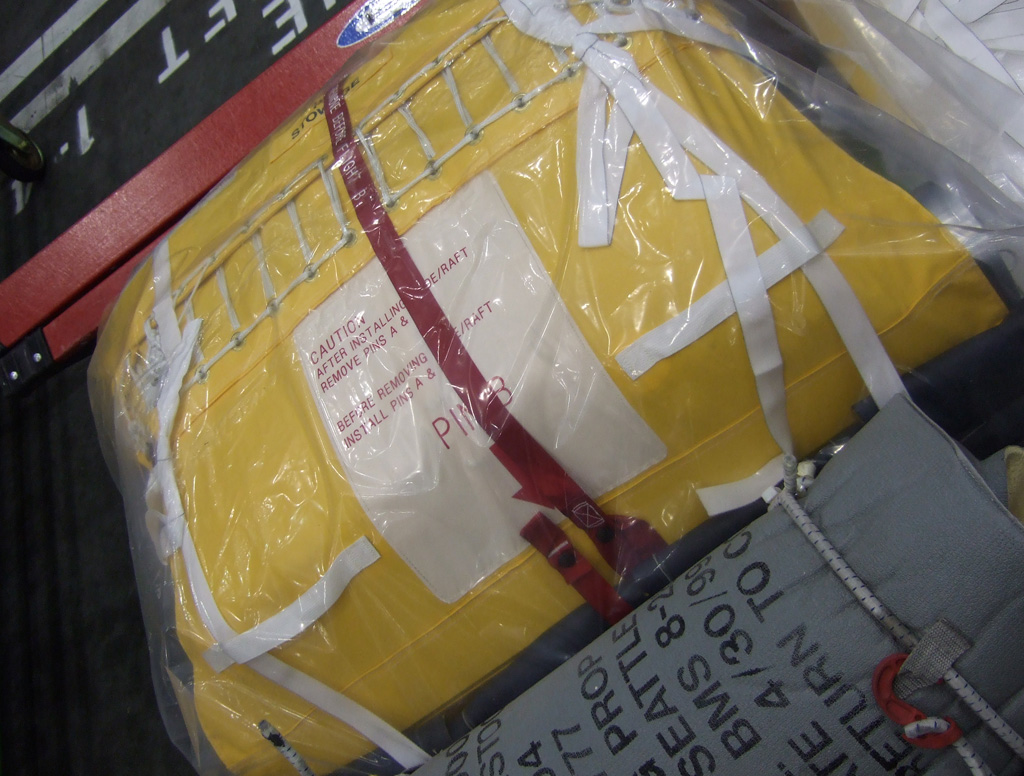
A packed evacuation slide

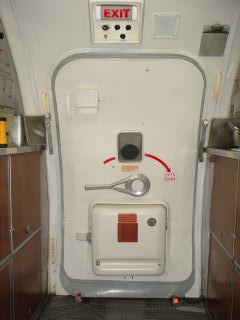
Evacuation slide in the box at the bottom of the door

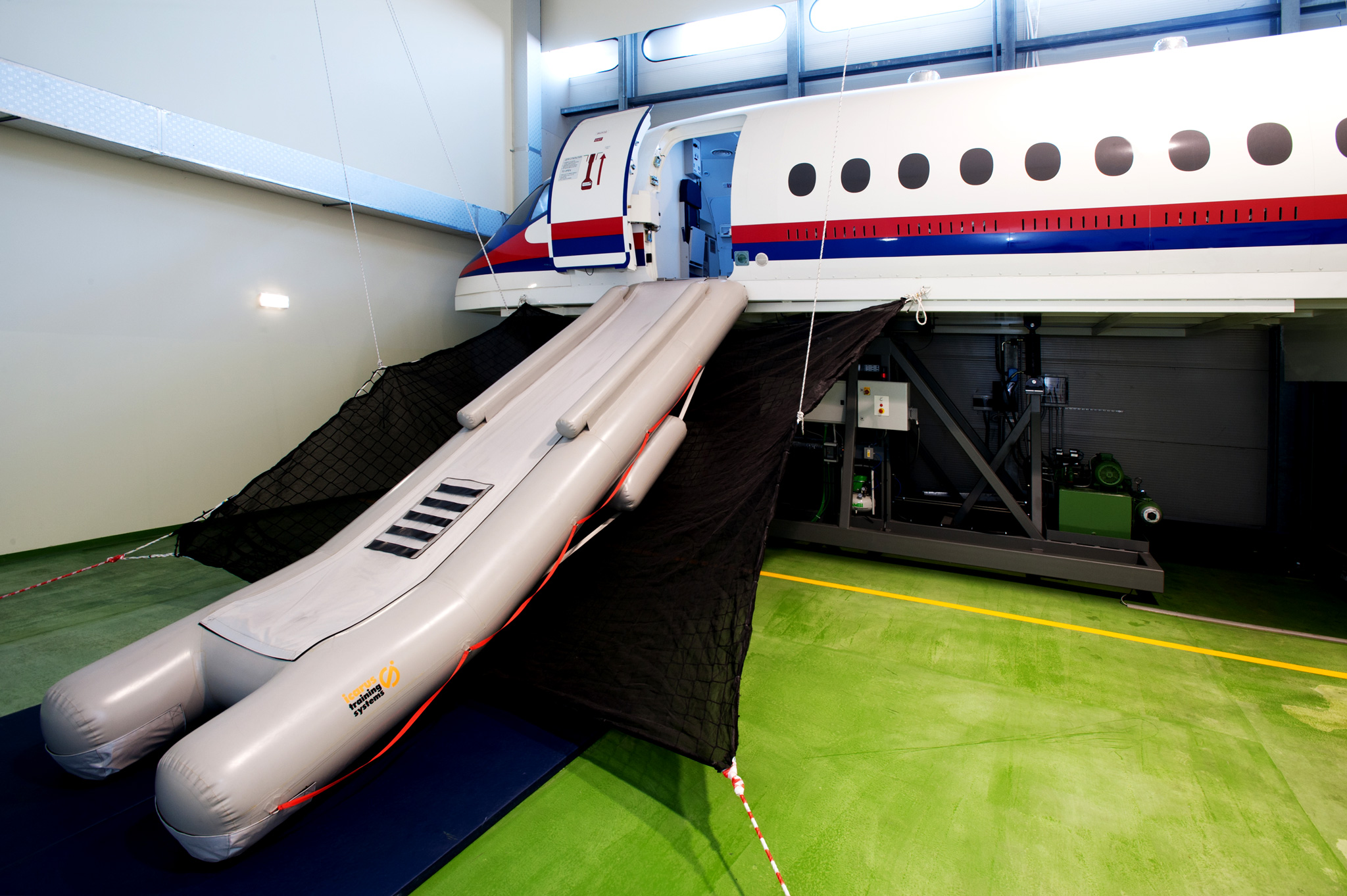
An inflated slide used for cabin certifications tests for the SSJ100

Prior to departure (usually before engine startup), all the aircraft doors are placed into the armed (or automatic) mode by the cabin crew. Methods of arming vary from aircraft to aircraft, but ultimately the girt bar (a metal bar attached to the door end of the slide) is physically attached to brackets either in or adjacent to the door sill. On older aircraft, such as the Boeing 737, this is done physically by the cabin crew and on most other aircraft it involves pushing a lever on the door itself which arms the door internally.

If a rapid evacuation is required and the doors are opened while "armed", the opening of the door pulls the slide pack out of the bustle (because the girt bar is physically attached to the aircraft floor). Due to the weight of both the door and the slide, great effort is involved in pushing the door open sufficiently to free the slide from the bustle, thus on larger aircraft a "power assist" function kicks in to aid the opening, either electrically or from compressed gas. Once the slide is completely free it will fall under gravity and after travelling a certain distance a pin will be pulled from a squib containing compressed gas and the slide will inflate. Should this system fail, the slide can be manually inflated by the cabin crew by pulling a manual inflation handle at the top of the slide. Should this also fail, standard operating procedures require the cabin crew to send passengers away from the door and to one that has a functioning escape slide.

Some Russian-built aircraft like the Tupolev Tu-154 have a very complicated process to activate and deploy the slides. The slides are stored in cabinets usually beside the emergency exit inside the aircraft. They are usually about the same width and height as a seat. To activate the slide, one must pull the front cover to a 90-degree angle, then pull the slide out so it is lying flat on the floor or door sill, open the emergency exit and kick or push it out. Gravity will then pull the slide to the ground and it will inflate.

Aircraft safety cards and in-flight safety demonstrations show the passengers where the nearest emergency exits are and how to use the evacuation slides. Additionally, flight attendants receive extensive safety training that covers the use of evacuation slides.

=== Usage ===
An article in Time by Amanda Ripley, with the assistance of aviation safety expert Dan Johnson, compiled some tips on how to avoid injury and escape from a plane on an inflatable slide. Their suggestions involved planning, exiting the aircraft and getting off the slide quickly, jumping, the correct body position and avoidance of clothing that could cause safety issues, such as spiked heels and pantyhose.

== Inadvertent deployment ==
A stand-alone device installed on the back of the door.

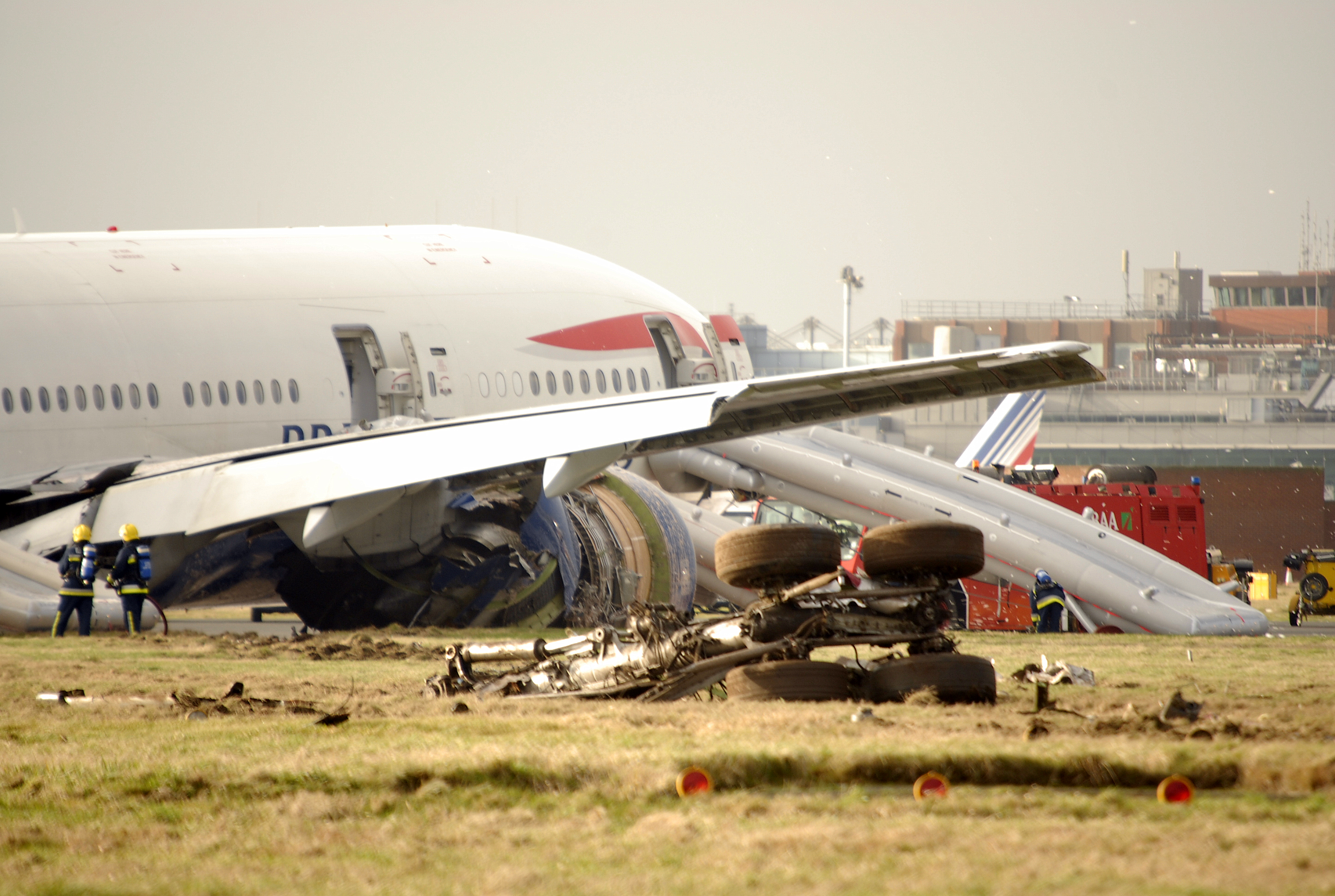
Emergency slides after the crash of British Airways Flight 38

Inadvertent slide deployment occurs when the operator of the aircraft door attempts to open the door when it is in the armed position. This costs the industry millions in lost revenue every year, estimated at $20 million in North America by cabin crew alone.

A device can be used to prevent this problem. It works by sounding an audible alert (voice) when the door operator, whether trained or not, is about to open the door in the armed position. It works as an independent system, requiring no action other than arming the door as per normal standard operating procedures. When the door is placed in the armed position, the device is armed. It can be installed as a stand-alone unit or integrated into the aircraft systems and powered from aircraft power.

== Inflation systems ==
Both slides and slide/rafts use non-explosive, inert gas inflation systems. The FAA requires evacuation of the entire aircraft in 90 seconds using 50% of the available evacuation exits. To meet this, all evacuation units need to deploy in less than 10 seconds. For large, wide body aircraft such as A380s and B747s a successful deployment is complete in about five to seven seconds, depending on conditions (such as temperature and winds).

The inflation system usually consists of a pressurized cylinder, a regulating valve, two high pressure hoses and two aspirators. The cylinder's volume can be between 100 and 1,000 cubic inches (1.6 and 16.4 litres), pressurized to about 3,000 pounds per square inch (200 standard atmospheres) with either gaseous Nitrogen (N_{2}), or a mixture of Carbon Dioxide (CO_{2}) and Nitrogen. Once made of steel, most cylinders now are made of aluminum or alloy cores wrapped with fiberglass, or other lightweight, fuel saving materials. The CO_{2} is used to slow down the rate at which the valve expends the gases.

The regulating valve mechanically meters out the gas at a pressure of roughly 300 to 600 pounds per square inch (20 to 41 atm) and a rate of about 4 cubic feet (0.11 m^{3}) per minute. Typically there are two high pressure hoses attached to the valve, which are connected at the other end to aspirators. These are usually cylindrical, hollow aluminum tubes with sliding cylindrical or internal flapper doors that open when high pressure gas is applied, and close when the gas stream subsides and the internal slide back pressure reaches about 2.8 - 3.7 psi. They work on the Venturi principle, and draw outside air into the evacuation unit at a rate of about 500:1. A 750-cubic-inch (12.3-litre) gas cylinder can fill a slide with about 850 cu ft (24 m^{3}) of air to a pressure of about 3 psi (0.20 atm) in about four to six seconds.

For the slide to deploy correctly, it is packed in a manner that has the aspirators directly under the outer cover. The entire, self-contained slide pack is approximately 3 ft (0.91 m) wide, 2.5 ft (0.76 m) long and about 1 ft (0.30 m) high, depending on aircraft type. In the center, forward part of the pack, a multi-layered piece of heavy urethane or neoprene/nylon fabric, called the girt, is left hanging out to a length of about 2 ft (0.61 m). When installed in the aircraft, a girt bar is put through the center, outside end of the girt and attached to the interior floor, just inside and in front of the exit door. On the face of the girt are instructions in large red lettering, and a handle with the word 'PULL' on it.

This is rarely used however, because the lanyard attached to the handle runs through the girt to the valve, which is several inches too short when the girt is extended fully. When the slide is in the armed position and the door is opened, the slide pack falls free of the door bustle (a semi-rigid outer container) and the weight and momentum of the slide pulls the lanyard from the valve, initiating the flow of gas. At about the same time, a metal pin that holds the center of the Valise closed is also pulled, releasing a daisy chain and the two halves of the cover. When the cover is released and the inflation system activated, the two aspirators come shooting out of the pack, gulping vast quantities of air and restrained only by the fabric tubes to which they are securely fastened.

To compensate for any wind, new evacuation slides contain internal baffles, which cause the ends nearest the aircraft to inflate first, which are constructed to come out like four elbows and press against the fuselage of the aircraft to the forward and aft sides of the exit door. There are also half-tie restraints which keep the inflating slide from drooping or blowing under the aircraft. These restraints are constructed so that when the slide becomes fairly rigid, at around 1.5 to 2 psi (0.10 to 0.14 atm), they detach very quickly (there are usually two), and since the header tubes are already against the fuselage, the slide pops almost horizontally out from the door, then drops relatively gently to the ground. Tests in 25-knot (46 km/h) cross winds have shown these deployment systems to be very effective.

Independent of the inflation system, all slides are equipped with at least one pressure relief device per inflation chamber. This protects the chamber from catastrophic failure due to over pressurizing. (Typically, modern slides are made of at least two inflation chambers, and should be able to evacuate an aircraft even when one chamber loses all pressure.)

All new evacuation slides are tested on a mock-up of an aircraft exit door and filmed prior to being certified as airworthy and delivered to a customer. Also, new units are usually constructed of urethane materials and impregnated or coated with an aluminized coating so that the slide will survive for a short while even if fire is nearby. Older slides are yellow and made of neoprene/nylon fabric.

== Exempted aircraft ==
Airplanes such as the Embraer ERJ family, Fokker 50 family, Antonov An-148 family, ATR family and the Bombardier CRJ family do not have escape slides because all exits are at a distance from the ground (less than 6 feet (1.8 m)), below which evacuation assisting devices are not required by regulations. On the primary entrance door, 1L, some of these aircraft have stairs that are either connected to the door or drop down.

== See also ==
- Chute
- Detrainment device
- Index of aviation articles
- List of inflatable manufactured goods
