= Overwing exit =

Emergency exits on an aircraft

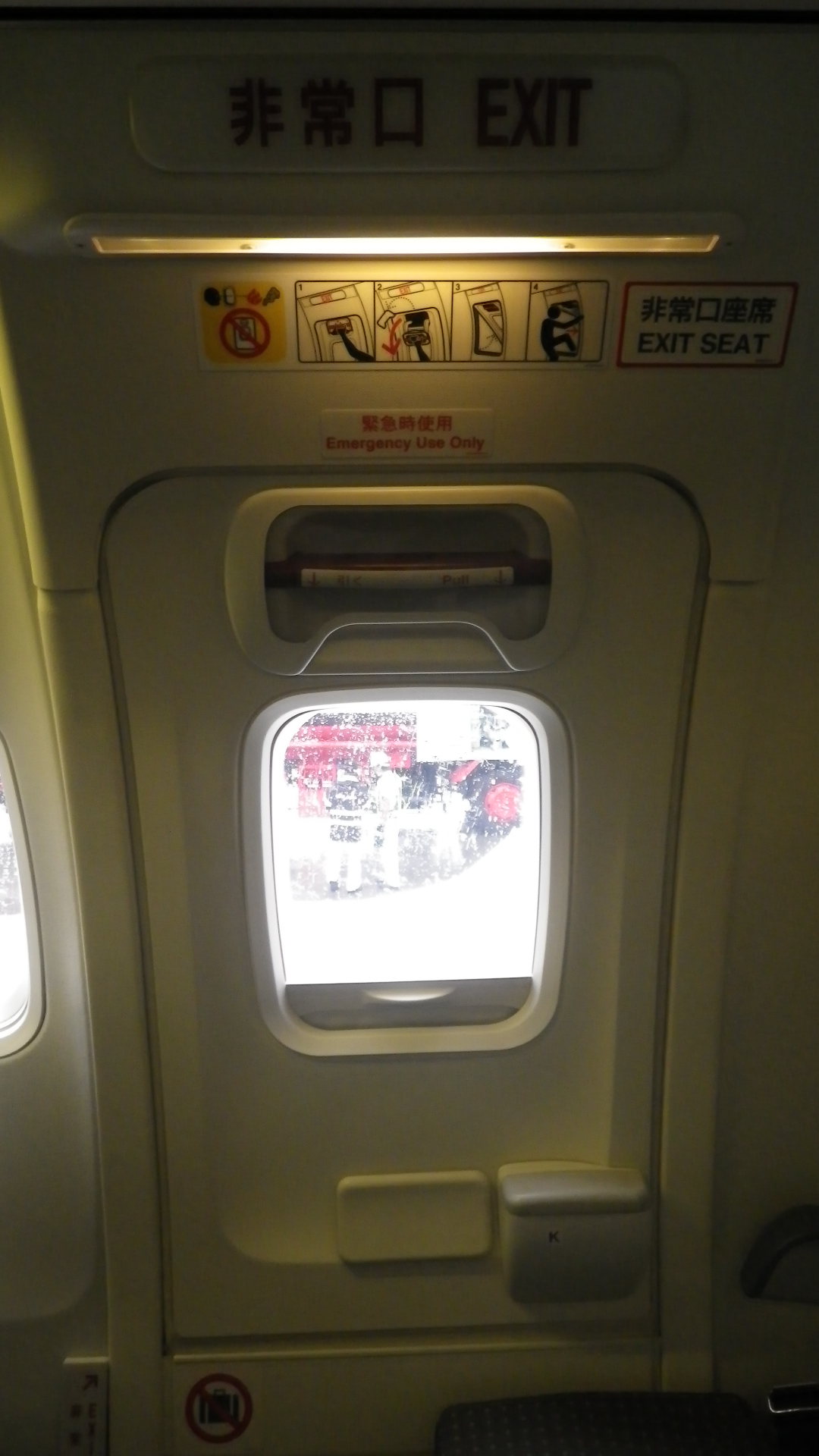
Boeing 737 overwing exit

Overwing emergency exits are found on passenger aircraft to provide a means of evacuation onto the wing, where passengers continue off the trailing edge, either by sliding down the extended Flaps or by using an evacuation slide that deploys when the exit is opened.

Overwing exits are smaller in width and height than standard emergency exits on an aircraft, and therefore have a reduced evacuation capacity, and are typically added to aircraft where there is insufficient evacuation capacity at the main doors to obtain a 90 second evacuation, but where the addition of another set of full sized exits is not necessary to accomplish this.

Overwing exits are primarily self-help exits meaning that in an emergency evacuation the passengers seated immediately adjacent to the exit will be responsible for assessing external hazards and opening the exit. Thus, airlines normally restrict seating in these rows to people who are physically capable of assisting in an evacuation, and are not flying with children or other passengers that they may need to assist.

== Hazards ==
The primary hazard involving the use of overwing exits is passengers not waiting to be given the command to evacuate, but rather initiating it themselves. While some passengers may believe they are capable of deciding when it is appropriate to evacuate, they are not trained in the specific dangers or the sequence of events required to decide when a full-scale evacuation is needed. Also, passengers frequently open an exit as soon as evacuation begins which may result in them evacuating into danger. This occurred in the Ryanair engine fire in Stansted Airport in 2002, where passengers evacuated themselves onto a burning wing, despite airport fire services personnel shouting at them to return inside the aircraft and evacuate via a usable exit. Typically, these problems do not occur at floor level, full sized, exit doors because these are operated in an emergency by flight attendants, who have extensive emergency training.

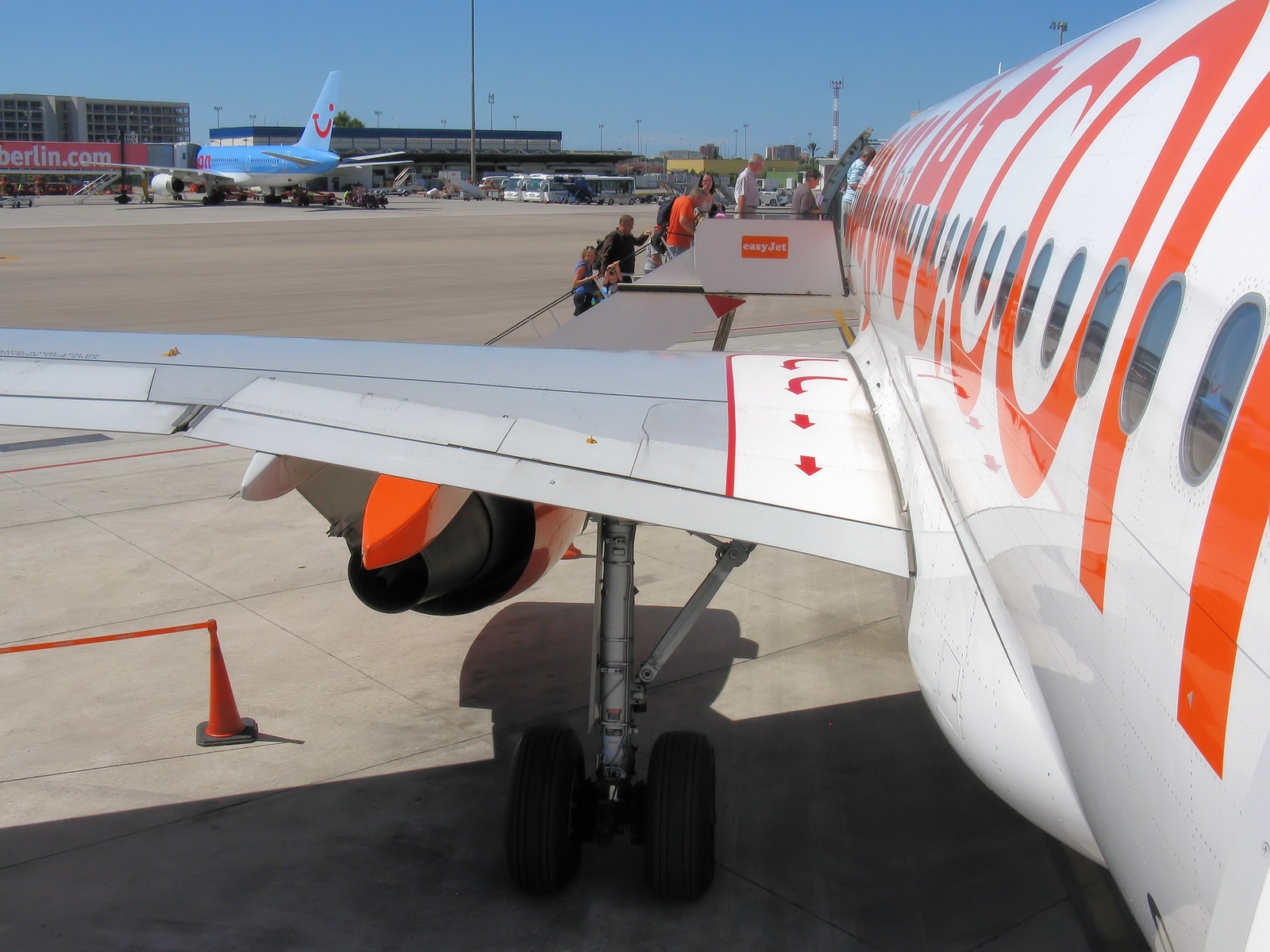
The preferred escape route for passengers, if they exit the overwing doors after an emergency on this EasyJet Airbus A319-100, is marked by red arrows on a white background. The arrowed route has non-slip paint so is safer to walk over than the rest of the wing.

Another hazard in the use of overwing exits is their being improperly opened, usually a result of passengers in these seats not paying attention to the verbal briefing provided pre-departure, or not observing the opening instructions on the safety card and on the exit. The majority of overwing exits involve the passenger physically removing the hatch from its frame and disposing of it outside on the wing without blocking the exit. Research conducted at the Cranfield Institute in the UK showed that many passengers are prone to leaving the exit hatch on the seat next to the exit, thereby hindering other passengers' egress through the exit.

Additionally, during aircraft evacuations, it has been found that the majority of overwing window exit designs of Boeing 737 (NG) Next Generation Line along with the Airbus A320, hamper evacuation in comparison with traditional floor level exits due to the inherent "step up and through motion" required of passengers as they exit the aircraft, unlike the designs of older generation wide body aircraft such as the Boeing 747, Boeing 777, McDonnell Douglas DC-10 and Lockheed L1011 which are all floor level.

== Operation ==
There are principally two types of overwing exits, excluding the full-sized door on the likes of the Boeing 747 and Boeing 777, which is not considered an overwing exit - referred to as a Type I or Type A exit) in use on modern aircraft. These disposable hatch type exits are called Type IIIA and Type IIIB exits. The first (older) type IIIA is the most common, especially in the Airbus A320, where the operator must first remove the "plug" type hatch from its frame before disposing of it on the wing. The second type is the self-disposing Type IIIB hatch, found on more modern aircraft (such as the Boeing 737 Next Generation) which has been designed to both simplify the opening of the exit and to reduce the hazard of the removed hatch blocking the exit. This is accomplished by the passengers simply pulling in and down on a handle recessed into the top of the door and initiating the exit's self-opening mechanism, whereby the door rotates up and out on a hinge at the top of the exit frame.

Depending on the height of the aircraft from the ground, an overwing exit may have an automatically inflating slide that is housed within the fuselage near to the exit(s). If the exit is opened the slide will automatically deploy and inflate to provide a means of evacuation from the wing to the ground. Only the slide and emergency lighting on the same side of the aircraft as the open hatch will operate. However, on aircraft where there is a pair of adjacent overwing exits on both sides of the aircraft (i.e. four in total), such as on some Boeing 767-300 variants, opening one of the pair of doors will deploy the slide. Should slide inflation fail, there is a manual inflation handle within the door frame of each exit (the location of which varies but is always indicated on the safety information card) which can be pulled to inflate the slide. Should this also fail, sliding down the extended flaps on the rear of the wing is possible.

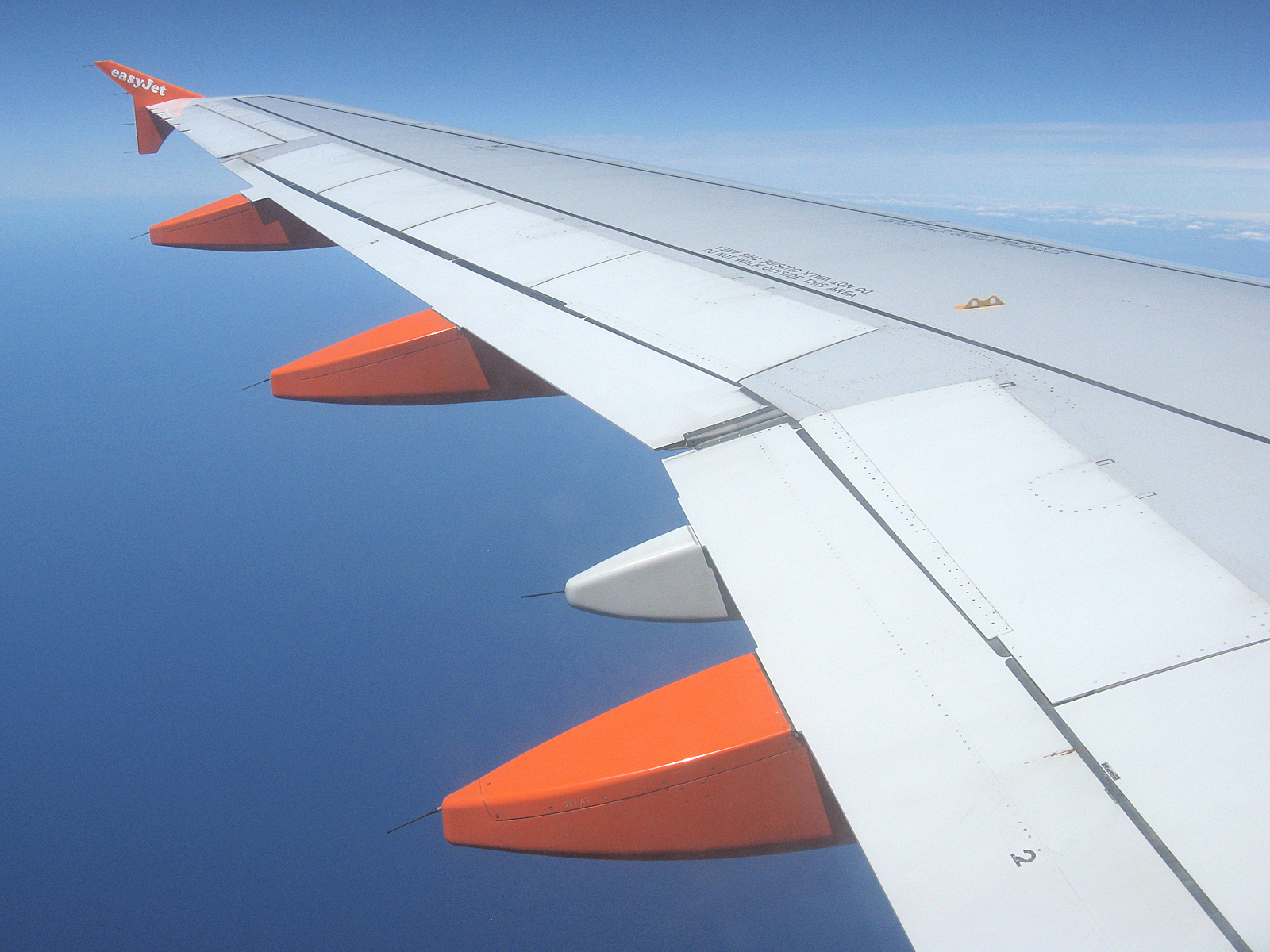
The (two hole) escape rope bracket on this EasyJet Airbus A319-100 has been painted yellow.

== Use in a ditching ==
The use of overwing exits in a ditching varies from airline to airline but is generally a secondary (not primary) means of escape. On aircraft fitted with overwing exits, there is typically a raised escape rope bracket (about a third of the way from the door) attached to the wing's upper surface and typically painted yellow. This is accompanied by an escape rope found in the frame of the exit after opening the hatch. Once this rope is attached to the escape rope bracket, it will aid passenger evacuation onto the wing to await rescue or to enter the water (depending on the airline's procedures). On aircraft with life rafts to be launched via the overwing exit (such as the Boeing 737), the wing will be used to provide a boarding platform onto the life raft. On certain regional aircraft the overwing exits are the only escape route in the event of a ditching. Some aircraft do not permit the use of overwing exits in a ditching, and instead instruct passengers to evacuate via a door equipped with a life raft.
