= Emergency exit =

Pathway out of a structure designed for use during emergency evacuations

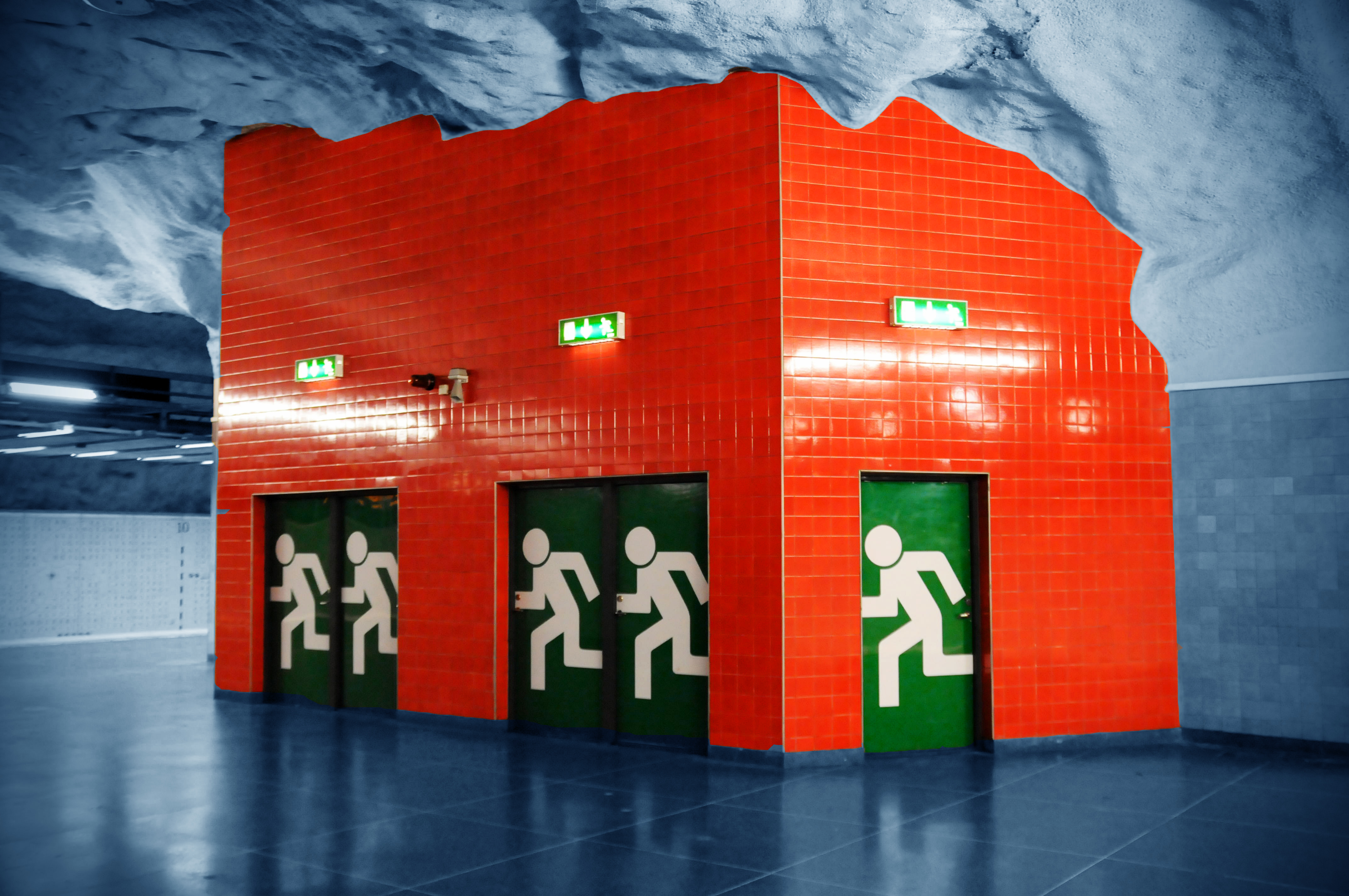
Emergency exit in Universitetet metro station in Stockholm

An emergency exit (also known as a fire exit) is a special exit used during emergencies in a building or other structure such as fires. The combined use of regular and emergency exits allows for faster evacuation, and emergency exits provide alternative means of evacuation if regular exits are inaccessible.

Emergency exits must:

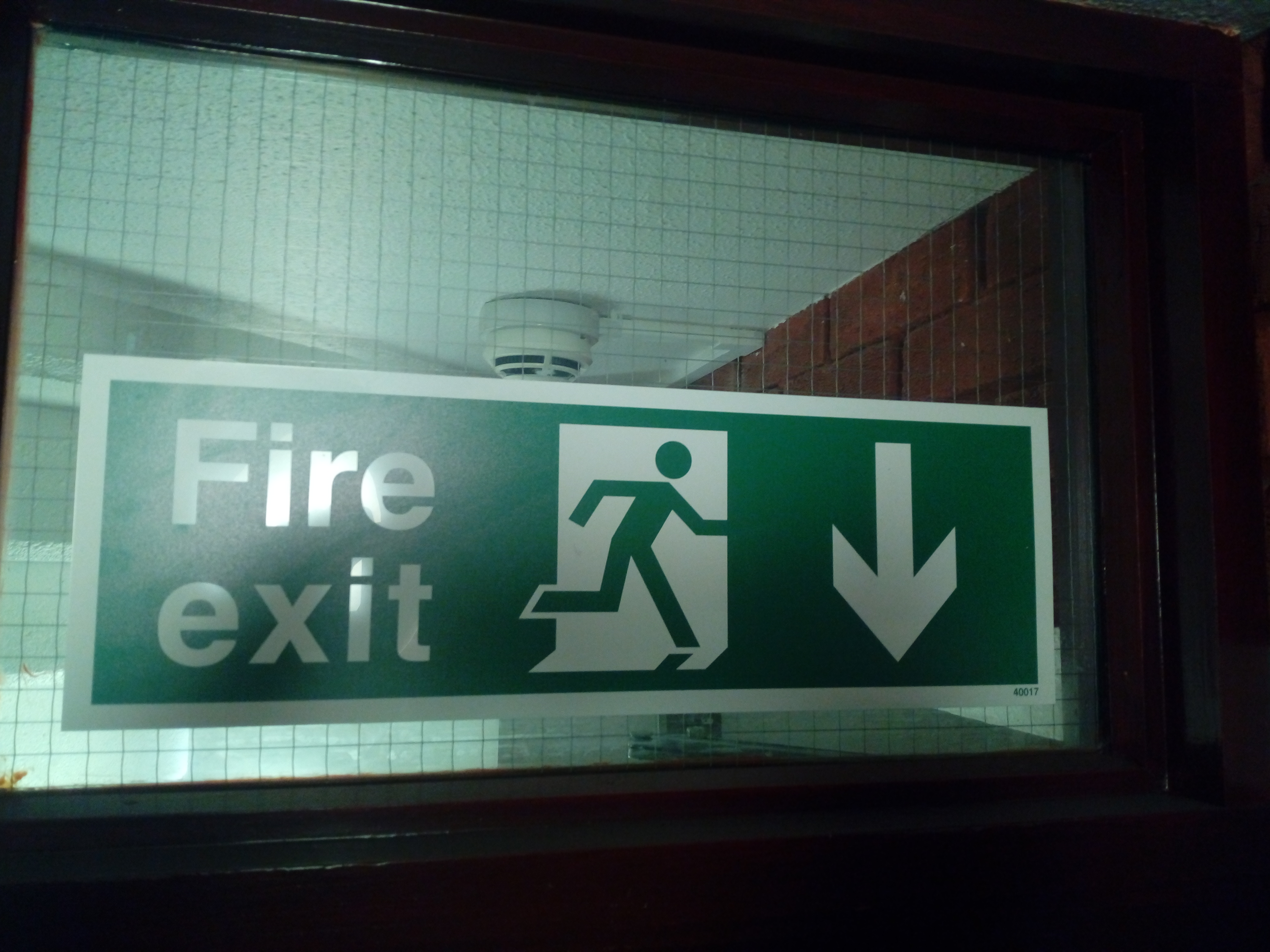
- An exit sign in the United Kingdom above an exit route, stuck onto the window
  Be clearly marked (usually with signage that is normally illuminated, or is illuminated by a backup power source if central power fails)
- Be in easily-accessible locations
- Direct people to safe areas (usually outside)
- Be regularly maintained and free of obstructions (they may not be used for storage)
- Be secured to prevent unauthorized entry during normal operations
- Open in the direction of escape

An emergency exit's path usually ends in an outward-opening door with a crash bar with exit signs pointing to it. It is usually a door to an area outside of the building, but may also lead to an adjoining, fire-isolated structure with clear exits of its own.

A fire escape is a special kind of emergency exit consisting of stairs and/or extendable escape ladders mounted on the outside of a building.

== Buildings ==
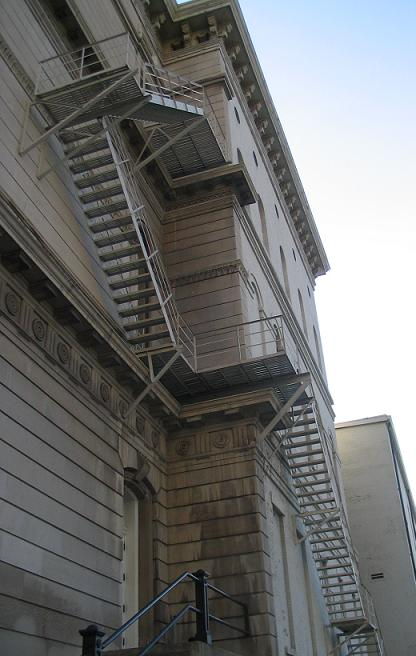
A fire escape is a type of external emergency exit

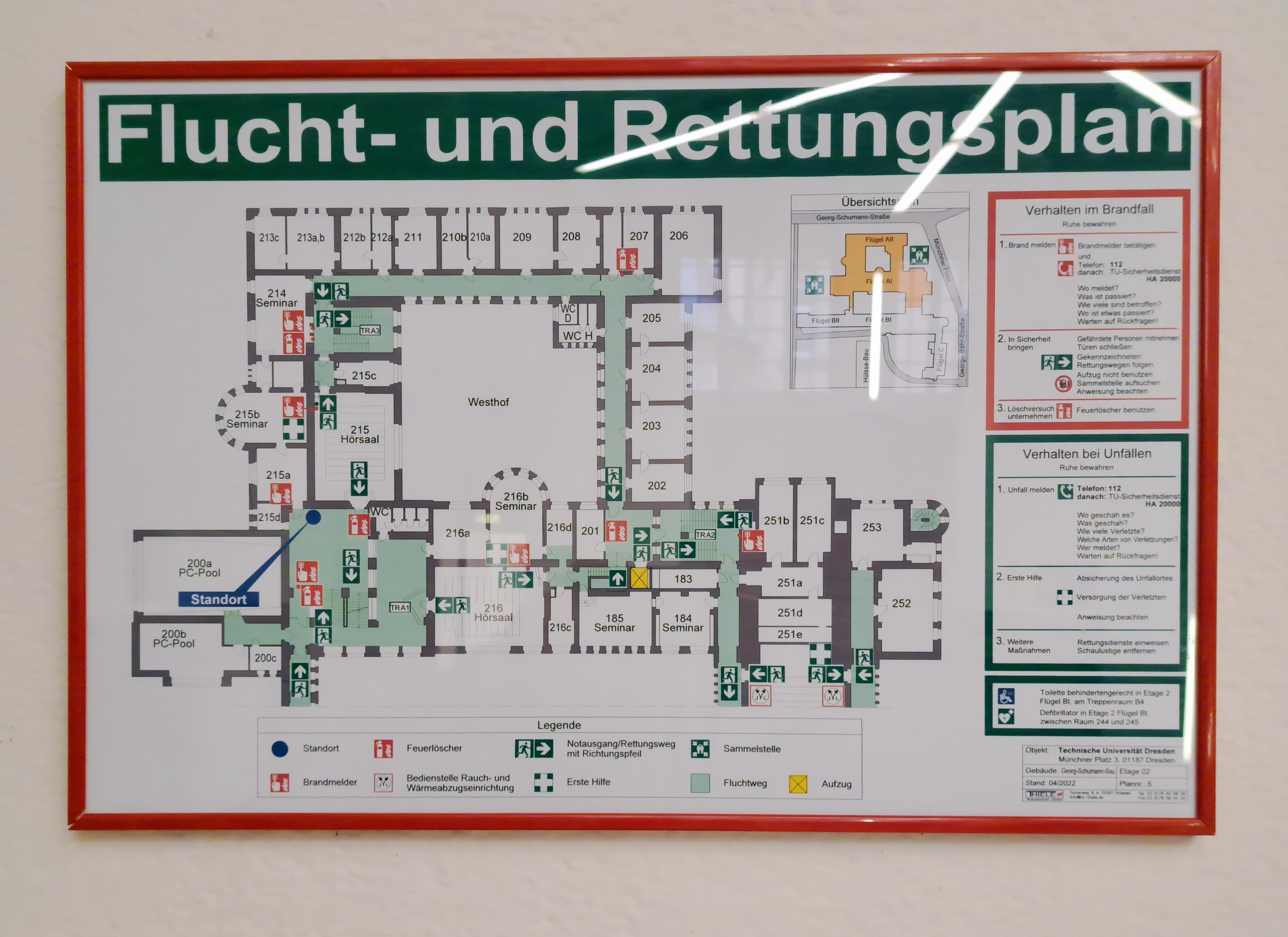
Escape and evacuation plan, Dresden

Local building codes or building regulations often dictate the number of fire exits required for a building of a given size, including the number of stairwells. For any buildings bigger than a private house, modern codes invariably specify at least two sets of stairs, completely isolated from each other so that if one becomes impassable due to smoke or flames, the other remains usable.

The traditional way to satisfy this requirement was to construct two separate stairwell stacks, each occupying its own footprint within each floorplan. Each stairwell is internally configured into an arrangement often called a "U-return" or "return" design. The two stairwells may be constructed next to each other, separated by a fireproof partition, or optionally the two stairwells may be located at some distance from each other within the floorplan. The traditional arrangement has the advantage of being easily understood by building occupants and occasional visitors.

Some architects save space while still meeting the exit requirement, by housing two stairwells in a "double helix" or "scissors stairs" configuration whereby two stairwells occupy the same floor footprint, but are intertwined while being separated by fireproof partitions along their entire run. However, this design deposits anybody descending the stack into alternating locations on each successive floor, and this can be very disorienting. Some building codes recommend using a color-coded stripe and signage to distinguish otherwise identical-looking stairwells from each other, and to make following a quick exit path easier.

In older buildings that predate modern fire codes, and which lack space for a second stairwell, having intertwining stairs so close to each other may not allow firefighters going up and evacuees going down to use separate stairways.

For example, Westfield Stratford City uses a scissors stairway configuration in its upper car park. This part of the building has eight storeys: LG, G, and 1 are part of the shopping centre; 2 has some offices and a storage area; CP1, CP2, CP3, and CP4 are a multi-storey car park. The floors are served by the main public lifts and escalators, and by 1 set of a double-helix stairway and lift per 1,000 square metres (11,000 sq ft), going into the service areas. The main public escalators do not count as fire exits, as the doors may be locked during less busy periods. The building has one fire exit per 4,000 square metres (43,000 sq ft) of floor space.

Knowing the location of emergency exits in buildings can save lives. Some buildings, such as schools, have fire drills to practice using emergency exits. Many disasters could have been prevented if people had known where fire escapes were and if emergency exits had not been blocked. For example, in the September 11, 2001, attacks on the World Trade Center, some of the emergency exits inside the building were inaccessible, while others were locked. In the Stardust Disaster and the 2006 Moscow hospital fire, the emergency exits were locked and most windows barred shut. In the case of the Station Nightclub, the premises were over capacity the night fire broke out, the front exit was not designed well (right outside the door, the concrete approach split 90 degrees and a railing ran along the edge), and an emergency exit swung inward, not outward as code requires.

In many countries, it is required that all new commercial buildings include well-marked emergency exits. Some older buildings must be retrofitted with fire escapes. In countries where emergency exits are not standard, or the standards are not enforced, fires will often result in a much greater loss of life.

=== Signage ===
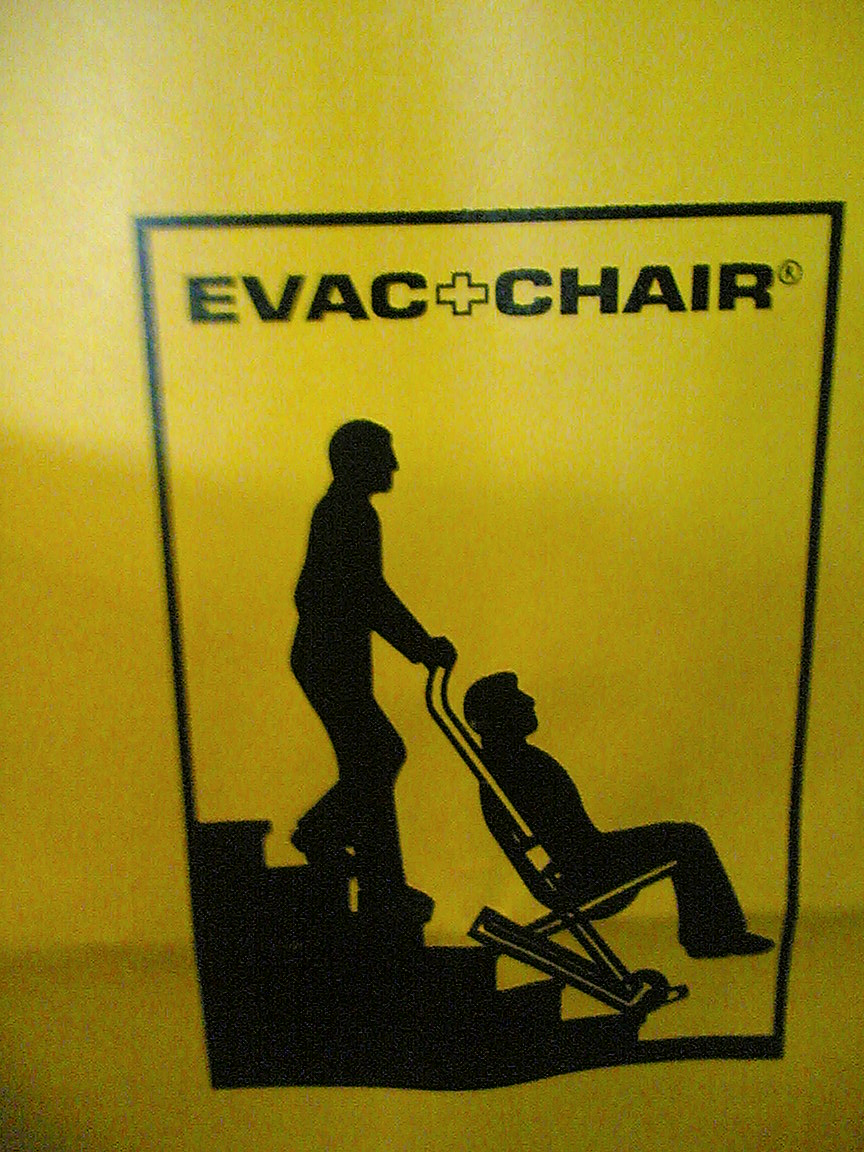
Sign for an emergency down stairs evacuation device for disabled people

The UK Health and Safety (Safety Signs and Signals) Regulations 1996 define a fire safety sign as an illuminated sign or acoustic signal that provides information on escape routes and emergency exits. Well-designed emergency exit signs are necessary for emergency exits to be effective.

Fire escape signs usually display the word "EXIT" or the equivalent word in the local language with large, well-lit, green letters, or the green pictorial "running-man" symbol developed and adopted in Japan around 1980 and introduced in 2003 by ISO 7010. Pictorial green "running-man" sign is mandatory in Japan, European Union, South Korea, Australia, New Zealand and Canada, and increasingly becoming common elsewhere.

Some states in the United States currently require the exit signs to be colored red, despite the usage of color red in signage usually implies hazards, prohibited actions or stop, while the color green implies safe place/actions or to proceed. Older building code in Canada required red exit signs, but no new installation is allowed.

=== Emergency door release ===
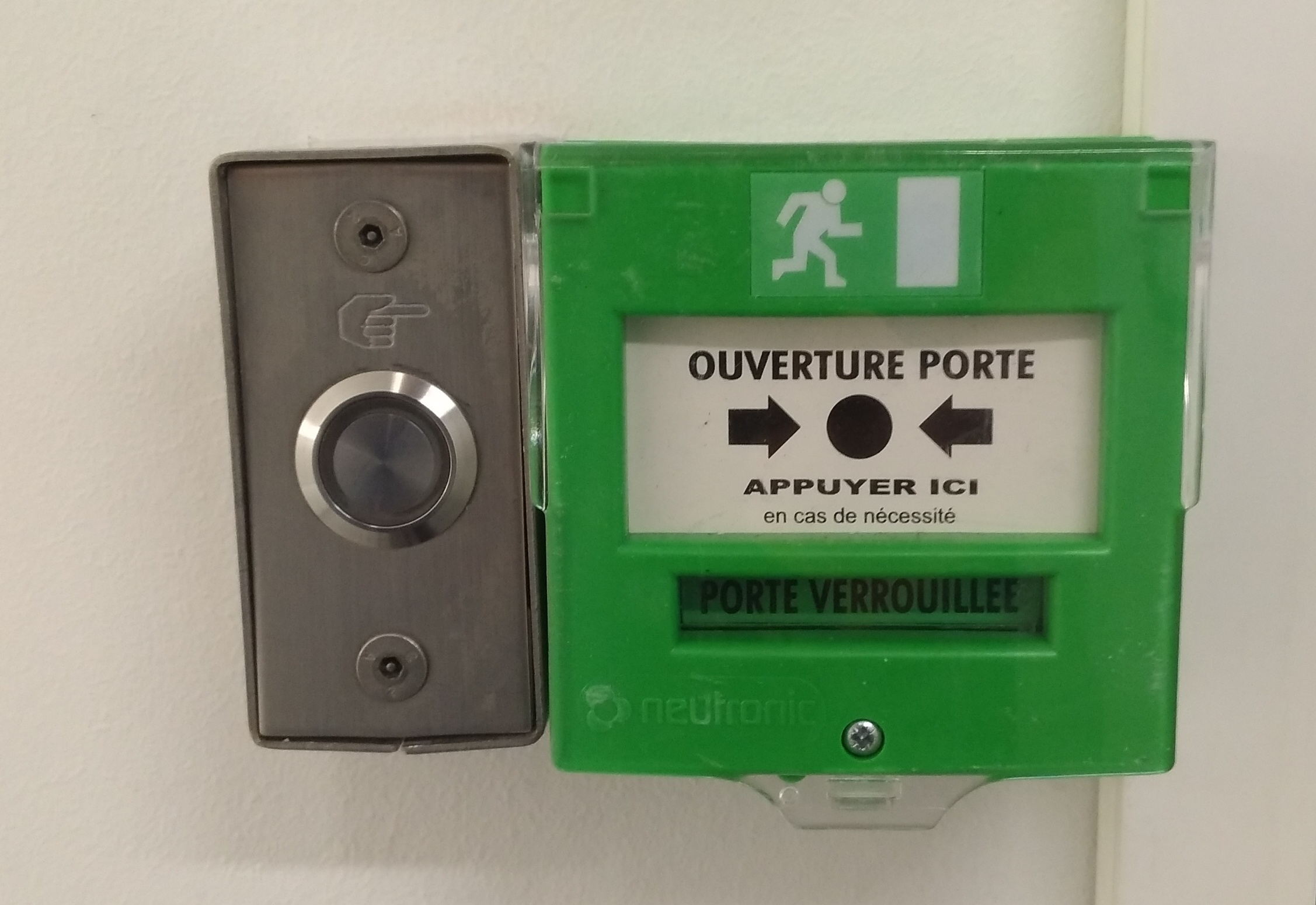
An emergency door release call point in Limonest, Rhône, France

An emergency door release call point (or a pull station in the United States) is used to disengage locking devices such as electromagnets, bolt locks, and electric locks while also ensuring positive security and failsafe operation.

== Nightclubs, restaurants, and similar venues ==
Worldwide, there have been repeated mass casualties in nightclubs and related venues where large numbers of people may gather. A violent personal dispute, fire, terrorist attack, or other incident can cause a mass panic or stampede for the exits. If the exits are blocked, locked, hidden, or inadequate, large numbers of casualties and deaths can result. The 1942 Cocoanut Grove fire in Boston caused over 400 deaths from a flash fire in a blacked-out nightclub with only a single obvious exit through a revolving door. Building codes and life safety regulations were extensively reformed in the US in the following years, and influenced changes in many other countries as well.

However, mass casualty incidents still occur in the United States and elsewhere in the world, due to inadequate enforcement of safety rules. For a list of some of the most notable incidents, see Template:Club fires.

== Blocked exits ==
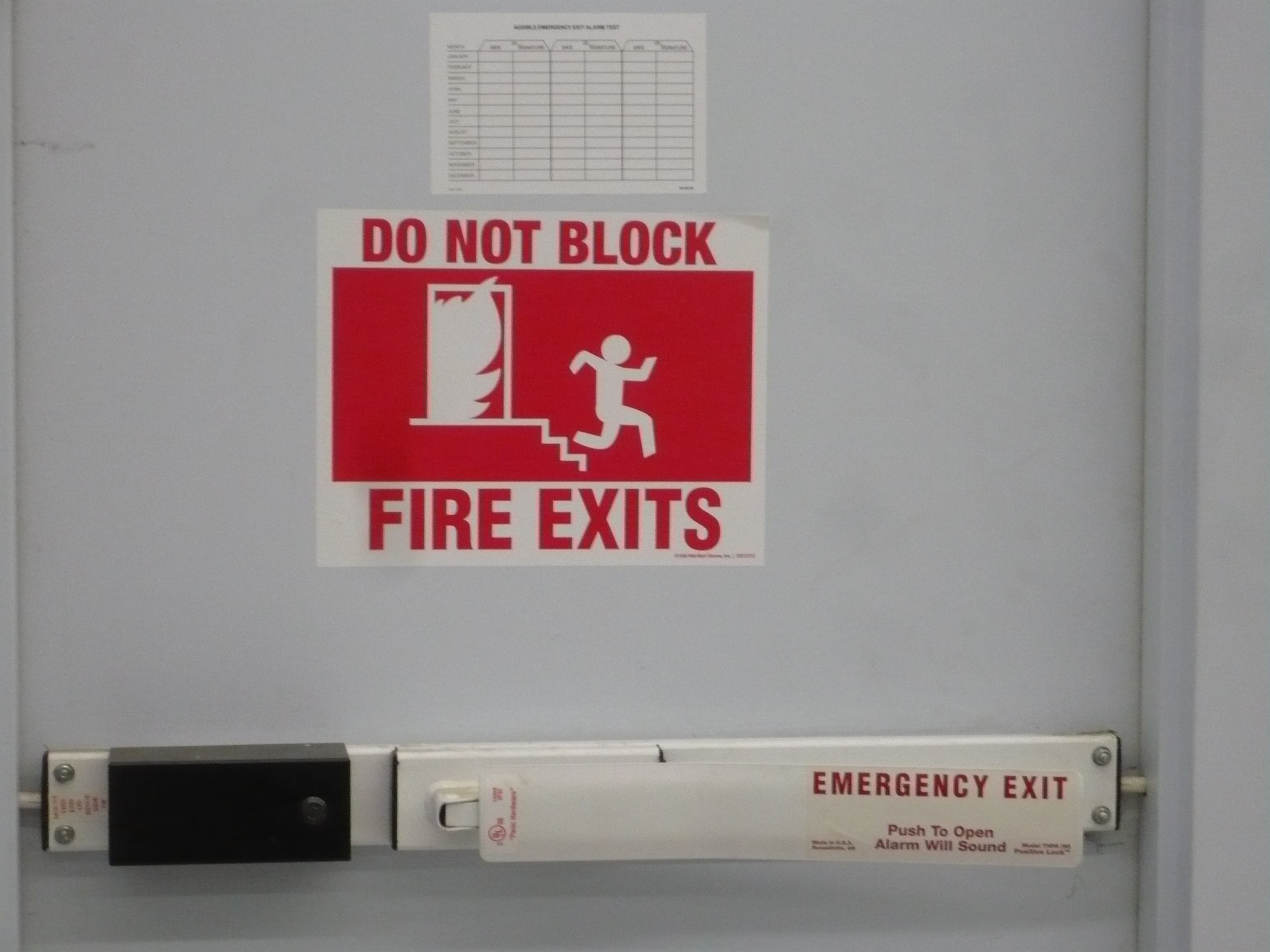
This exit is unlocked by pressing the bar, which will also activate an alarm.

Firefighters have cited overzealous security guards who told people during a fire that they are not allowed to use emergency exits. The practice is actually quite common in the absence of fires, as well. Some skyscrapers have stairwells with standard emergency exit signs on each door, which then lock upon closing. Users of these stairwells can get trapped if they do not know that the only door that opens from the inside is the one on the ground floor.

A further problem becoming very common in the United States as of 2005 is that retail stores at night close one of their main entrance/exits through makeshift heavy metal barriers, signage, paper notes, or junk placed in front of the exits. Some actually lock their exits. A large array of signage and mechanical exit systems have also been devised, including signage that says contradictorily, "Not an exit", "Do not exit", "This is not an exit", "Do not use this exit", or warning users that a heavy penalty will be assessed for non-emergency use.

Some systems do not allow the exit to be opened until the user signals the intention to exit (through a button or lever) for some amount of time, such as 20 seconds. It is also common for these exits to remain completely locked until somebody tests them.

Some have alarms activated when they are opened, to alert staff of unauthorized use during non-emergencies. On many exits, the user may have to push against a crash bar or other door opening device for a period of time to unlock the door. Many exits have a sign reading, "Emergency exit only, alarm will sound if opened", to warn of the fact that it is an emergency exit only.

== Aircraft ==
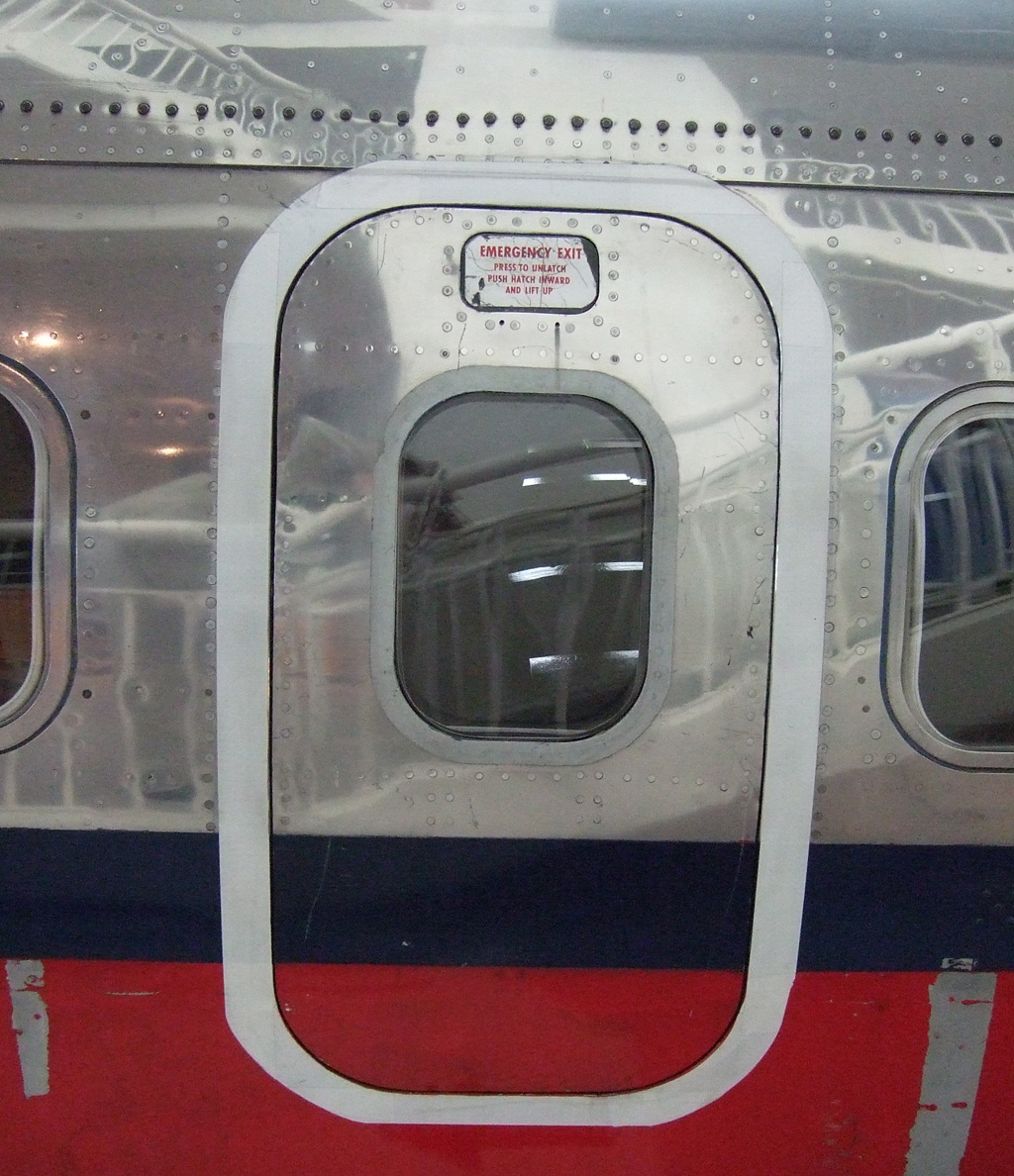
USAir Boeing 737 overwing emergency exit

In aircraft terms, an "exit" is any one of the main doors (entry doors on the port side of the aircraft and service doors on the starboard side) and an "emergency exit" is defined as an exit that is only ever used in an emergency (such as overwing exits and permanently-armed exits).

In the early years, the emergency exit was a hatch in the ceiling of the aircraft. Because in the 1928 KLM Fokker F.III Waalhaven crash the passengers did not know the location of this emergency exit, one passenger could not escape in time and died. As a result, better visibility of the emergency exit inside the cabin was advised by the investigative committee.

Passengers seated in exit rows may be called upon to assist and open exits in the event of an emergency.

The number and type of exits on an aircraft is regulated through strict rules within the industry, and is based on whether the aircraft is single or twin-aisled; the maximum passenger load; and the maximum distance from a seat to an exit. The goal of these regulations is to make possible the evacuation of an airliner's designed maximum occupancy of passengers and crew within 90 seconds even if half of the available exits are blocked.

Any aircraft where the emergency exit door sill height is above that which would make unaided escape possible is fitted with an automatic inflatable evacuation slide, which allows occupants to slide to the ground safely.

FAA exit types
Type	Width	Height	Step-up	Step-down	Exit limit
A+.	42 in (107 cm)	72 in (183 cm)	Floor level		120
A.	42 in (107 cm)	72 in (183 cm)	Floor level		110
B.	32 in (81 cm)	72 in (183 cm)	Floor level		75
C.	30 in (76 cm)	48 in (122 cm)	Floor level		55
I.	24 in (61 cm)	48 in (122 cm)	Floor level		45
II.	20 in (51 cm)	44 in (112 cm)	0 or 10 in (25 cm)	17 in (43 cm)	40
III.	20 in (51 cm)	36 in (91 cm)	20 in (51 cm)	27 in (69 cm)	35
IV.†	19 in (48 cm)	26 in (66 cm)	29 in (74 cm)	36 in (91 cm)	9

† 9 passenger aircraft only

Ventral exits must allow the same rate of egress as a Type I exit, tailcone exit are aft of the fuselage. Aircraft for less than 19 passenger must have one sufficient exit in each side of the fuselage, two per side for more, no more than 60 ft (18 m) apart from each other.

In November 2019, the EASA allowed "Type-A+" exits with a dual-lane evacuation slide to increase maximum accommodation increased to 480 seats up from 440 with four pairs of doors on the A350-1000, and up to 460 on the A330-900.

== Gallery ==
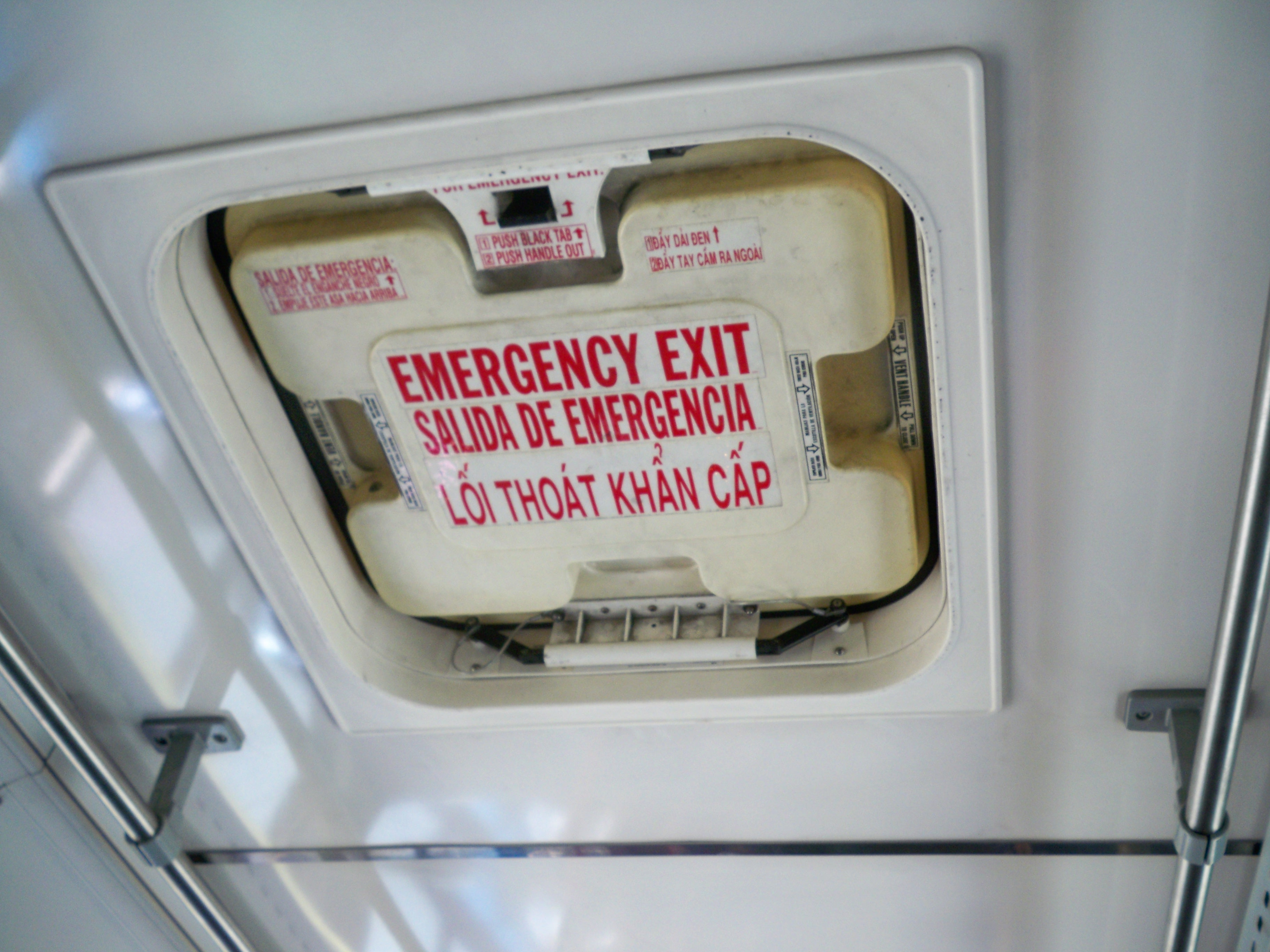
Public bus top emergency exit for when the sides are blocked, in English, Spanish and Vietnamese

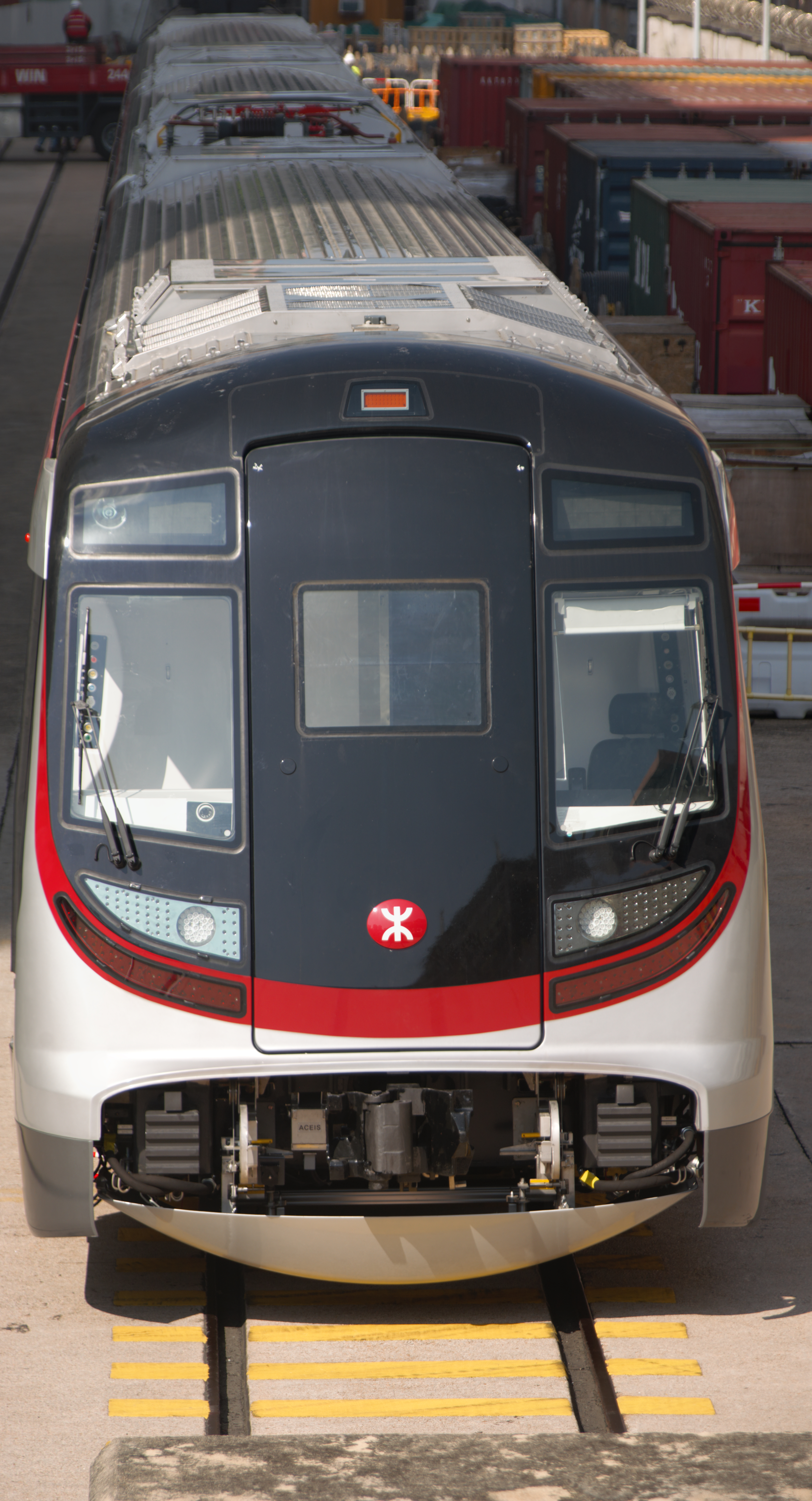
MTR Hyundai Rotem EMU train emergency exit in the middle of both heads/ends

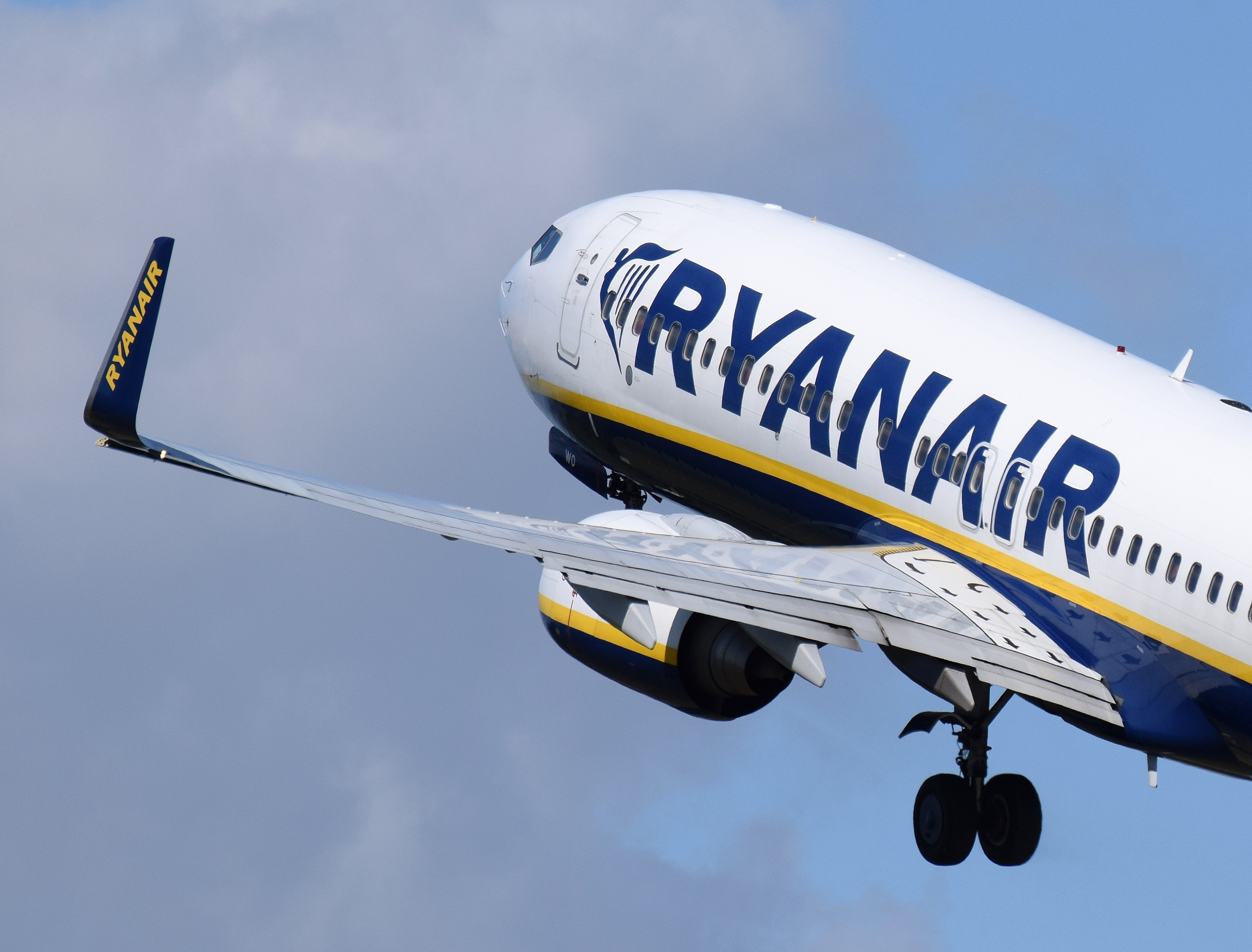
Ryanair Boeing 737-800 take off, showing the two overwing emergency evacuation doors

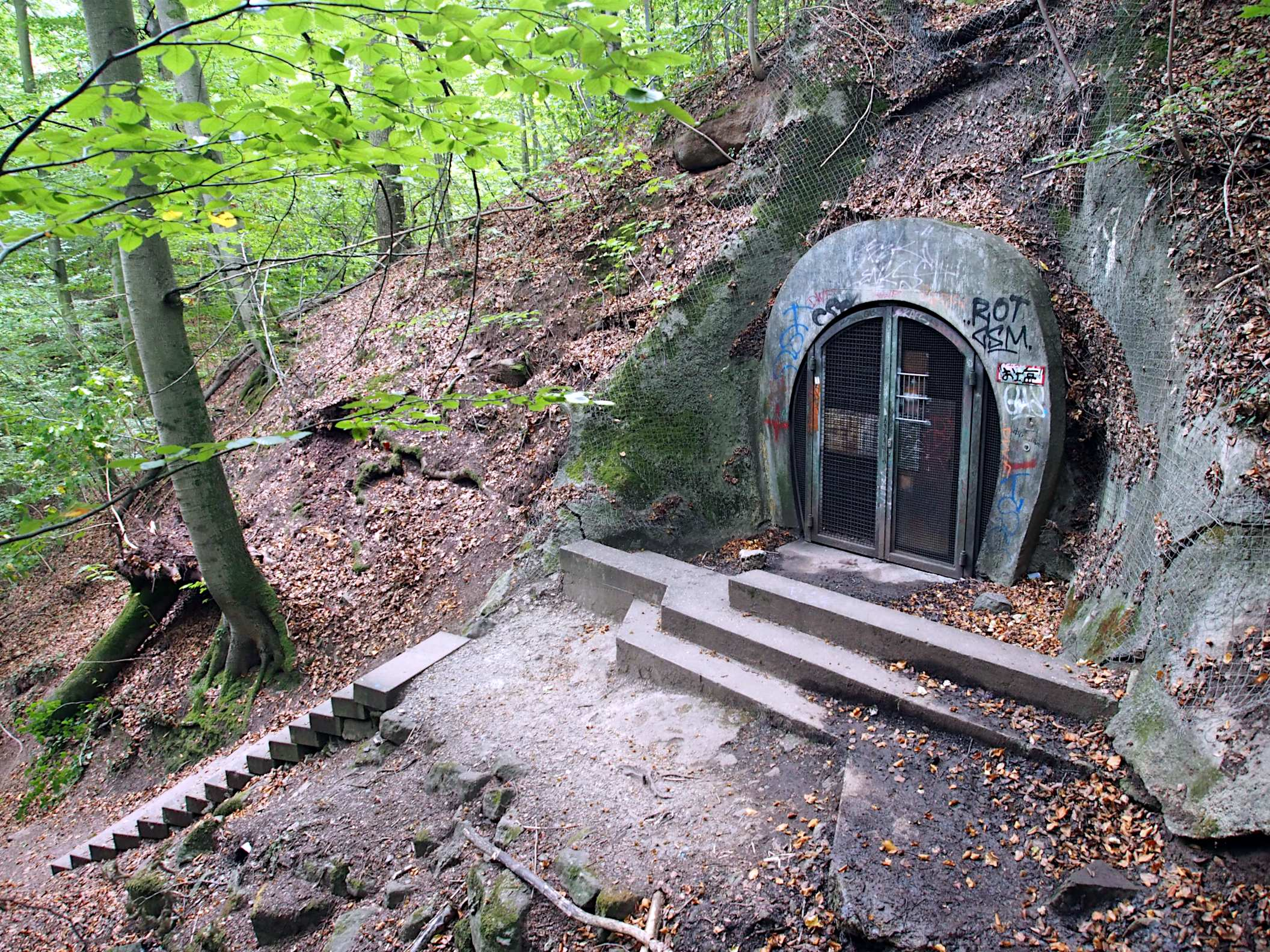
Railway tunnel exit opening out in rough terrain

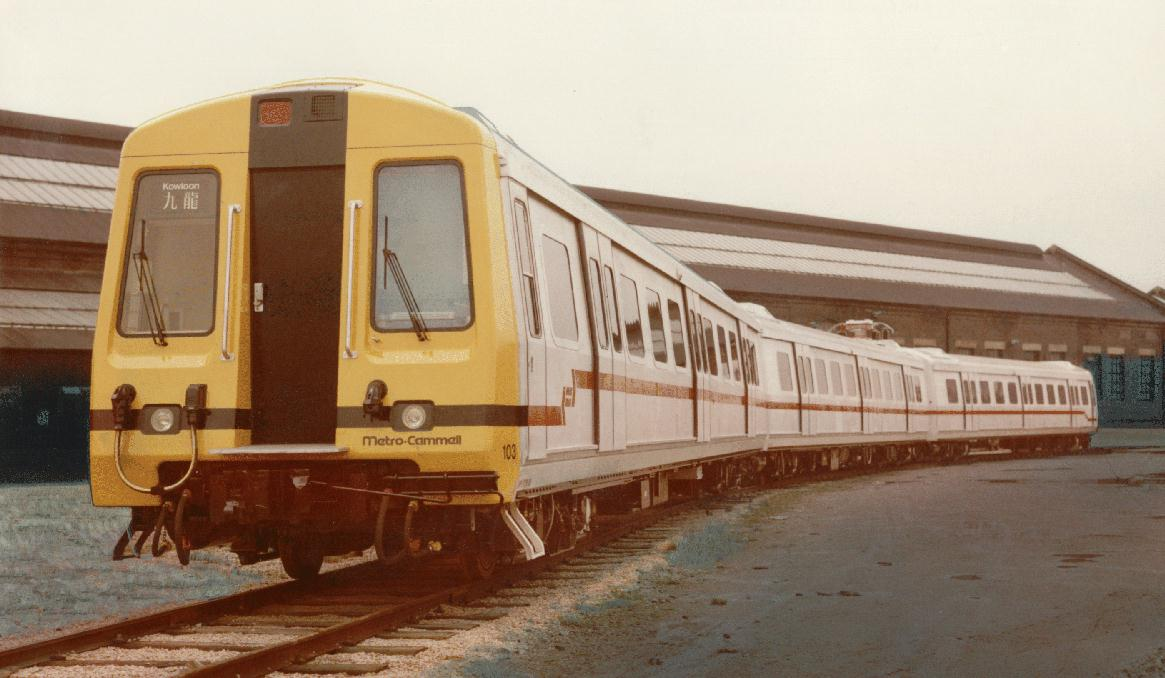
KCRC Metro-Cammell (before refurbishment) EMU emergency exit in the middle of both heads

== History ==
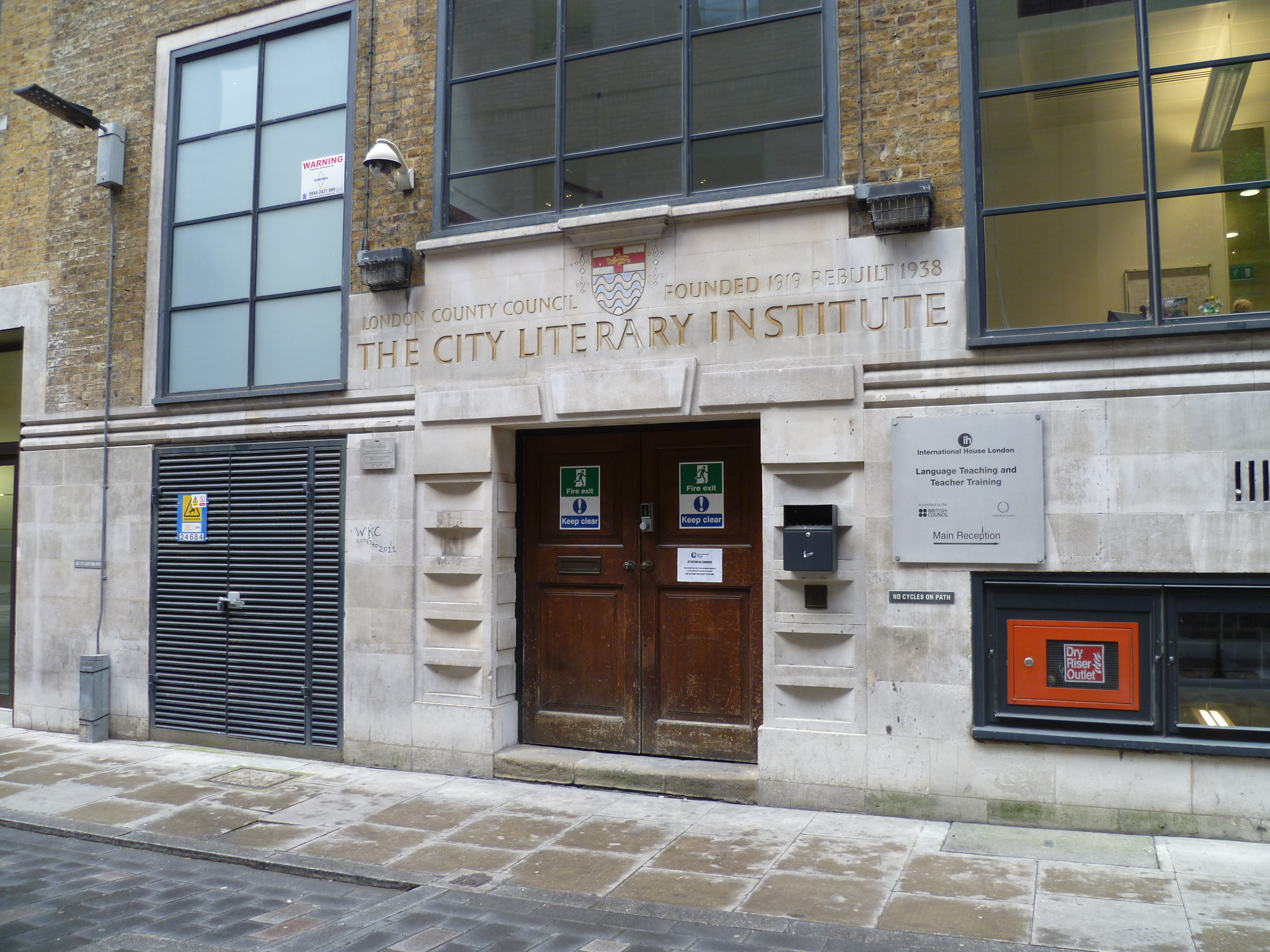
This was originally an entrance, as indicated by the carved name of the building, but the opening is now only used as a fire exit (London).

Following the events of the Victoria Hall disaster in Sunderland, England, in 1883 in which more than 180 children died because a door had been bolted at the bottom of a stairwell, the British government began legal moves to enforce minimum standards for building safety. This slowly led to the legal requirement that venues must have a minimum numbers of outward opening emergency exits as well as locks which could be opened from the inside.

These moves were not globally copied for some time. For example, in the United States, 146 factory workers died in the Triangle Shirtwaist Factory fire in 1911 when they were stopped by locked exits, and 492 people died in the Cocoanut Grove fire in a Boston nightclub in 1942. This led to regulations requiring that exits of large buildings open outward, and that enough emergency exits be provided to accommodate the building's capacity.

Similar disasters around the world also resulted in public fury and calls for changes to emergency regulations and enforcement. An investigation was launched by the Argentine federal government after 194 people were killed during the 2004 República Cromañón nightclub fire in Buenos Aires, Argentina. The emergency exits had been chained shut by the owners, to prevent people from sneaking into the club without paying.
