= Brown v BCA Trading Ltd (2016) =

Brown v BCA Trading Ltd [2016] EWHC 1464 (Ch) is an important England and Wales case management case − in which the Companies Court allowed the use of predictive coding in an electronic disclosure process involving the contested party for the first time − for the underlying case of “unfair prejudice” petition based on section 994 of the Companies Act 2006. It is also the first reported judgment to endorse the landmark decision in Pyrrho Investments Limited v MWB Property Limited [2016] EWHC 256 (Ch), whereby the main difference is both parties have approved the utilisation of predictive coding.

The case shows a development in the field of Artificial Intelligence and Law in the United Kingdom.

== Facts ==
The petitioner, David Brown, had submitted a petition based on section 994 of the Companies Act 2006 (regarding company's member protection from unfair prejudice) against several respondents, which are BCA Trading Limited, Robert Feltham, and Tradeouts Limited. The case had been registered as a ten-day trial. He attempted to recover an amount of more than £20 million. In this case management hearing, the court (Mr Registrar Jones) were requested to settle the following issues:

1. to determine whether the respondents should use predictive coding or keyword search method (which is a more traditional approach) to deliver an electronic disclosure. This became a problem because the respondents who were the only one agreeing on the utilisation on predictive due to its cost-effective nature. One of the respondents, BCA Trading Limited, was holding most of the relevant documents. They believed that it would be the most sensible and proportionate method for providing an electronic disclosure. The prospective expenses in using predictive coding were £132,000 while the costs for a traditional keyword approach were £250,000 - £338,000. On the other hand, the petitioner preferred to use the keyword searching as he concerned on the effectiveness of the relatively new predictive coding option.
2. to determine and approve each party's costs budget for costs management order purposes, particularly on the non-agreed costs, and make suitable revisions accordingly. The overall costs for counsels for the trial purposes were £445,000 for the petitioner and £287,000 for the respondents, with two contested elements of costs, as follow:
  - costs for disclosure, which were £124,000 for the petitioner and £54,000 for the respondents; and
  - costs for paralegals in pre-trial works, which were £37,500 (250 hours) for the petitioner and £16,000 (91 hours) for the respondents.

== Judgment ==
The directions were given as follow:

1. The court made an order to use predictive coding in assisting electronic disclosure in several stages. Firstly, the court issued a direction to identify the issues for the Section 994 of Companies Act petition to limit the scope of documents searches relevant to trial and, therefore, may reduce time and costs. It was because the petition illustrated broad issues of the dispute. Thus, both parties must investigate and discuss the relevant issues and files − including the source and site – general disclosure process, and the criteria. Also, the parties may ask the court again regarding the process of the standard of disclosure, if needed. The court also declared that proposed protocol by the Technology and Construction Court would be helpful in the electronic disclosure and Civil Procedure Rules (CPR) Practice Direction (PD) 31B (paragraph 8 and 9) must be complied. Secondly, if the first direction had been done, the court believed that “predictive coding must be way forward”. The court applied the ten factors in favouring predictive coding in Pyrrho Investments Ltd v MWB Property Ltd. Except for one neutral factor (no provision in CPR and practices prohibits such use) and one non-suitable factor (as the predictive coding process was agreed in that case), the other factors would support the use of such software in this case. The court further recognised that majority files were in possession of the respondents and the significance of the cost difference between both methods which made the price for predictive coding was considerably cheaper. Even though the cost was not the only deciding factor, the court understood that there was also no counter-argument had stated that such new method would be less effective in providing electronic disclosure. Furthermore, the court also noticed the rise of some suspicion towards the effectiveness of this method. Thus, it is urged that both parties must strive to obtain the sensible and proportionate outcome.
2. The court disproved the overall fees budget of £445,000 for the petitioner's side for a ten-day trial and asked the petitioner to reconsider the budget. CPR 3.15 and 'Willis v MRJ Rundell & Associates Ltd' [2013] EWHC 2923 (TCC) applied in this case. Regarding the first fee element, disclosure costs, the court declared that the figures proposed by the petitioner were not proportionate and reasonable as they included 30,000 emails that would be in the respondents’ disclosure instead. Further, on the paralegal costs, the court considered that the petitioner had possibly spent more time in trial preparation that the respondents did. However, the court decided that 180-hour period was sensible instead of the proposed 250 hours.

== Commentary ==
Disclosure process in English litigation requires all parties to identify all documents related to the proceedings that they hold and provide them to the opposing party (save for some exclusion). Predictive coding, also known as a technology-assisted review (TAR), might assist this process. Predictive coding software requires a senior lawyer to assess several disclosure documents and then analyse the review, along with a couple of enhancement, producing an algorithm. Subsequently, the algorithm will be applied to the entire disclosure documents database to make numerous documents for lawyer's manual review. This process is arguably more precise than a human (paralegals) review, and it reduces time and costs. This method is more suitable and proportionate to large-volume documents. One electronic disclosure provider in the United Kingdom, ‘Consilio’, recommends a minimum database of 50,000 documents to commercially reasonable for using the predictive coding. Nevertheless, a lesser number of documents may still use the software if desired.

In the first direction of this judgement and Pyrrho Investments Ltd v MWB Property Ltd, English courts finally legally accept this method due to the cost-saving element of the technology. The courts are also sceptical to any concerns on its inaccuracies. People commonly concern on the possibility of losing control of the predictive coding work. However, the experts argue that people do not assign the “case-critical decisions” to computers entirely in the predictive coding mechanism. It is managed by human decision-making instead and gives a greater supervision of the work. The court in this judgement also emphasises the significance of collaboration between both parties to identify the issues and concentrate on the scope of review before conducting the disclosure process. Concentration on this matter at preliminary phase will save time and cost provided that there are reasonable discussions conducted. Furthermore, this judgment also shows that the court may consider the opinion of the party possessing a large volume of documents – who bears the greater responsibility for the electronic disclosure process – in determining whether predictive coding may be employed or not. Also, the respondents’ solicitor on this case (Berwin Leighton Paisner LLP) shows that the cost-saving benefit will be gained by the larger firms owning in-house software rather than, the smaller firms using the external provider's services. Nevertheless, expert views that outsourced model of predictive coding may still be more efficient than traditional manual review model.

The practice has been initially developed in the United States, particularly in the case of Da Silva Moore v Publicis Group in 2012 and Rio Tinto plc v Vale SA in 2014 and also used in Ireland in the case of in Irish Bank Resolution Corporation Ltd v Quinn in 2015. Because the United States is the first one use the predictive coding, it is questionable whether English Courts’ electronic disclosure follow the United States’. Practitioners argue that there is a different justification in using predictive coding in the disclosure in both jurisdictions. The United States’ disclosure puts the importance of the relevance and proportionality to the issues in the disputed case and claims size. On the other hand, the English Courts’ approach emphasises on the costs proportionality the most.

Observing this new trend, some practitioners predict the development of the utilisation of predictive coding in English courts. As the court in this judgment has approved such use despite the existence of a contested party – there might be a case where the court directs the disclosing parties to use the predictive coding software against their wishes. When that situation occurs, experts believe that using predictive coding in the electronic disclosure will be regarded as the standard rather than the exemption.
