= PSU =

PSU or psu may refer to:

== Organizations ==
=== Education ===
==== United States ====
- Pacific States University, a private university in Los Angeles, California
- Pembroke State University, a public university in Pembroke, North Carolina
- Pennsylvania State University, a public university in Pennsylvania
- Pittsburg State University, a public university in Pittsburg, Kansas
- Plattsburgh State University, a public university in Plattsburgh, New York
- Plymouth State University, a public university in Plymouth, New Hampshire
- Portland State University, a public university in Portland, Oregon

==== Worldwide ====
- Palawan State University, a public university in Puerto Princesa, Philippines
- Pangasinan State University, a public university in Pangasinan, Philippines
- Papua State University, a public university in West Papua, Indonesia
- Partido State University, a public university in Camarines Sur, Philippines
- Prince of Songkla University, a public university in southern Thailand
- Prince Sultan University, a private university in Riyadh, Saudi Arabia
- Puntland State University, a public university in Garowe, Puntland, Somalia

=== Military ===
- Police Support Unit, a paramilitary wing of the Zimbabwe Republic Police
- Port Security Unit, a U.S. Coast Guard expeditionary force protection unit

=== Political parties ===
- Parti Socialiste Unifié (disambiguation), various parties
- United Socialist Party (Bolivia), Bolivia (Partido Socialista Unificado)

=== Other organizations ===
- Personal Support Unit, a UK charity assisting individuals in court proceedings
- Prudential Staff Union, former trade union in the UK
- Public sector undertakings in India, companies owned by government in India

== Other uses ==
- Power supply unit (computer)
- Police support unit (United Kingdom)
- Passenger service unit, above each seat in a passenger airplane
- Polysulfone, family of high performance thermoplastics
- Phantasy Star Universe, a persistent ORPG game by SEGA for PlayStation 2, Xbox 360 and PC
- Practical salinity unit, a unit for quantifying a fluid's salinity
- Primary sampling unit, in sampling (statistics)
- Program Storage Unit, a chip as used e.g. in the Fairchild F8 microprocessor
- Projective special unitary group, a mathematical quotient
- Prueba de Selección Universitaria, public university admission test in Chile
