= Pyrrho Investments Limited v MWB Property Limited =

Pyrrho Investments Limited v MWB Property Limited [2016] EWHC 256 (Ch) is the first British case to consider the use of ‘predictive coding’ during electronic discovery (e-discovery) process of document disclosure. The High Court found that ‘predictive coding’ was permissible when use of such technology was proportionate in terms of cost, though needs to be considered on a case-by-case basis.

== Facts ==
This judgment provides the reasons for approving the use of predictive coding during e-discovery process of this case, which is to be considered in July 2017.

Predictive coding is synonymous with ‘technology assisted review’, ‘computer assisted review’ and ‘assisted review’. This means that the review is done by a computer software rather than by humans. The method that the software uses to review is by means of scoring each document for relevance to the case of concern. Parties will agree on a protocol for use of the coding, and criteria for the documents used in the process. This could include keywords. Some documents remain to be considered manually by humans, for example if they are too short. A representative sample is made by someone with the capability to make decisions as to the relevance of a certain set of documents, categorising them. This is then used to train the predictive coding software. The software works by analysing the documents for common concepts and language. It will then review each document as relevant or not. Checks are then made by humans on samples for quality assurance. Where the human deems that the software has made an error on any given document, this is fed back to the software again which learns for a second time. This process is repeated as many times as required until the level of errors is within the agreed tolerable rate. This technology can save both time and money.

== Claims ==
Pyrrho Investments Limited was a significant shareholder in the Second Claimant, MWB Business Exchange Limited. Pyrrho sued the Second to Fifth Defendants, directors of MWB Business Exchange Limited, for their breach of fiduciary duty resulting in alleged payments being made from MWB Business Exchange Limited. The Claimants argued that some of the payments were made for the benefit of the First Defendant, MWB Property Limited, who are liable to account for them. The value of the claim is very large – somewhere in the tens of millions of pounds. Additional claims have been made but were not resolved at the time of this case.

The parties requested court approval to use predictive coding software primarily because of the number of electronic documents held by MWB Business Exchange Limited. They held around 17.6 million documents from back-up tapes that held data from the email accounts of the Second to Fifth Defendants. This figure was reduced to 3.1 million by electronic de-duplication processes. However, this is still a large number which would be costly. Goodale v Ministry of Justice illustrates the problem that e-discovery poses.

All parties in this case agreed to the use of predictive coding and the scope of the keywords to be used. Paragraphs 10-15 of the court's consent order in relation to this case govern the disclosure process.

== The Law ==
The relevant legislation for this in England are the Civil Procedure Rules Part 31 and its related Practice Directions.

Standard disclosure under Rule 31.6 is that parties are required to make searches for disclosable documents other than those which the party relies on. Rule 31.7 further serves to outline the search obligation, under which parties have to make a reasonable search. Reasonable is further explained to be in accordance with several factors, including the number of documents; the nature and complexity of proceedings; the ease and expense of document retrieval; and the significance of any document likely to be found.

Practice Direction B deals more specifically with e-discovery. Here, it is made clear that the parties should remember the overriding objective of disclosure, which includes ensuring processes are proportionate to the case. In determining the ease and expense of document retrieval, factors that are relevant include accessibility taking into account developments in hardware or software systems accessible; the location of the relevant electronic documents; the likelihood of locating relevant data; the cost of recovering and disclosing documents; the likelihood that electronic documents will be materially altered in the course of recovery, discovery or inspection; the availability of documents from other sources; and the significance of documents likely to be found.

The legislation does not determine how any search during the discovery process should be conducted. There has been no comment on whether the search has to be conducted by humans, or whether it is permissible to use computer programs beyond that stated in Practice Direction B at paragraphs 25–26. These state that it may be reasonable during e-discovery to use keywords or other automated methods if a full review of documents would be unreasonable, though this would be insufficient alone and parties using such methods should consider additional techniques such as individual reviews of documents in certain categories.

Finally, the Technology and Construction Court support an e-discovery protocol which contemplates the use of predictive coding in appropriate circumstances. However, this is only protocol, hence lacking force.

== Judgment ==
This kind of procedure isn't entirely new, but in the 1980s technology was not viewed the same as it had not been normalised into everyday life and was not as advanced as it currently is. Seeking approval for its use was appropriate because of the novelty of the use of such technology. Moore v. Publicus Groupe and Irish Bank Resolution Corporation Ltd v. Quinn were considered.

There are ten factors in favour of approving the use of predictive coding technology during e-discovery. The first is that other jurisdictions have found such software to be useful in appropriate cases. The second is that there is no evidence suggesting that use results in a lower degree of accuracy than manual review by humans. The third is that there would be greater consistency if a senior lawyer made the judgment on the initial sample which was then applied to the rest of the documents, instead of multiple lower-grade fee-earners working independently. The fourth is that there is no legislation prohibiting its use. The fifth is that the number of documents was huge, which leads to the sixth which is that the cost of searching such a large number would be “unreasonable” under Practice Direction B to Part 31 especially where there is a cheaper alternative. The seventh is that the cost of using predictive coding depends on various factors, including the number of documents and whether a further manual review needs completion. The eighth is that the value of the claim needs to be proportionate to the estimated costs of using the software. The ninth is the amount of time available to consider other discovery methods if the predictive coding turned out to be unsatisfactory. The tenth is that the parties had agreed on use of the software.

There were no factors contrary to this position.

Finally, use of predictive coding in other cases “depends upon the particular circumstances”, hence require approval.

== Significance ==
This case has been described as a “landmark decision” because it is the first English case to consider the issue of using predictive coding in the electronic discovery process.

== Related cases ==
- Goodale v Ministry of Justice
- Da Silva Moore v. Publicis Groupe et al
- Irish Bank Resolution Corporation Ltd v Quinn
