= Civil Procedure Rules =

Rules of civil procedure in English and Welsh courts

Civil Procedure Rules 1998
- Statutory Instrument
- Parliament of the United Kingdom
- Citation: SI 1998/3132
- Territorial extent: England and Wales

Dates
- Made: 10 December 1998
- Laid before Parliament: 17 December 1998
- Commencement: 24 April 1999
Other legislation
Made under	Civil Procedure Act 1997
Amended by	Terrorist Asset-Freezing etc. Act 2010

Status: Amended

Text of statute as originally enacted

Text of the Civil Procedure Rules as in force today (including any amendments) within the United Kingdom, from legislation.gov.uk.

The Civil Procedure Rules (CPR) were introduced in 1997 as per the Civil Procedure Act 1997 by the Civil Procedure Rule Committee and are the rules of civil procedure used by the Court of Appeal, High Court of Justice, and the County Court in civil cases in England and Wales. They apply to all cases commenced after 26 April 1999, and largely replace the Rules of the Supreme Court and the County Court Rules. The Civil Procedure Rules 1998 (SI 1998/3132) is the statutory instrument listing the rules.

The CPR were designed to improve access to justice by making legal proceedings cheaper, quicker, and easier to understand for non-lawyers. As a consequence of this, many former, older legal terms were replaced with "plain English" equivalents, such as "claimant" for "plaintiff" and "witness summons" for "subpoena".

Unlike the previous rules of civil procedure, the CPR commence with a statement of their "overriding objective", both to aid in the application of specific provisions and to guide behaviour where no specific rule applies.

== History ==
In 1994, the Lord Chancellor instructed the then Master of the Rolls, Lord Woolf, to report on options to consolidate the existing rules of civil procedure.

On 16 June 1995, Lord Woolf published an interim report on Access to Justice. The interim report was the subject of extensive academic commentary. For example, American law professor Richard Marcus Jr. pointed out that the interim report was clearly inspired by the experience of the US federal courts with case management, which grew out of their experience with managing complex litigation. During the 1960s, a massive antitrust scandal in the American electrical equipment industry had led to the enactment of a multidistrict litigation statute in 1968 and the creation of the Judicial Panel on Multidistrict Litigation. In 1969, the panel published the Manual on Complex Litigation, which proposed that American judges should take a more active role in the management and development of complex cases during the pretrial phase of litigation. This recommendation touched off the case management movement of the 1970s and 1980s in American courts.

On 26 July 1996, Lord Woolf published his final Access to Justice Report 1996 in which he "identified a number of principles the civil justice system should meet to ensure access to justice. The system should –

1. be just in the results it delivers;
2. be fair in the way it treats litigants;
3. offer appropriate procedures at a reasonable cost;
4. deal with cases with reasonable speed;
5. be understandable to those who use it;
6. be responsive to the needs of those who use it;
7. provide as much certainty as the nature of particular cases allows; and
8. be effective: adequately resourced and organised". (Italics in the original.)

Lord Woolf listed two of the requirements of case management as "fixing timetables for the parties to take particular steps in the case; and limiting disclosure and expert evidence".

The second thread of the report was to control the cost of litigation, both in time and money, by focusing on key issues rather than every possible issue and limiting the amount of work that has to be done on the case.

The report was accompanied by draft rules of practice designed to implement Lord Woolf's proposals. These rules granted wide management powers to the court, proposed that cases be allocated to one of three tracks depending on their nature, limiting or requiring specific actions, and introduced the concept of proportionality to the costs regime.

Civil Procedure Act 1997 (Note: Section 11(1).)
- Act of Parliament
- Parliament of the United Kingdom
- Long title: An Act to amend the law about civil procedure in England and Wales; and for connected purposes.
- Citation: 1997 c. 12
- Territorial extent: England and Wales (Note: Section 11(3).)

Dates
- Royal assent: 27 February 1997
- Commencement: Various (Note: Section 11(2).)
Other legislation
Amends	Senior Courts Act 1981; County Courts Act 1984; Matrimonial and Family Proceedings Act 1984; Courts and Legal Services Act 1990
Amended by	Constitutional Reform Act 2005

Status: Amended

Text of statute as originally enacted

Text of the Civil Procedure Act 1997 as in force today (including any amendments) within the United Kingdom, from legislation.gov.uk.

The Civil Procedure Act 1997 (c. 12) was enacted on 27 February 1997. It conferred the power to make civil procedure rules. It also established the Civil Justice Council, a body composed of members of the judiciary, members of the legal professions and civil servants, and charged with reviewing the civil justice system.

The Civil Procedure Rules 1998 (SI 1998/3132) were made on 10 December 1998 and came into force on 26 April 1999. The draft rules of practice formed their core.

== Contents ==
=== The overriding objective ===
Implemented as a result of reforms suggested by Lord Woolf and his committee, one of the innovations of the rules is the "overriding objective" embodied in Part 1 of the Rules, which states:

- 1.1
  - (1) These Rules are a new procedural code with the overriding objective of enabling the court to deal with cases justly and at proportionate cost.
  - (2) Dealing with a case justly includes, so far as is practicable –
    - (a) ensuring that the parties are on an equal footing;
    - (b) saving expense;
    - (c) dealing with the case in ways which are proportionate –
      - (i) to the amount of money involved;
      - (ii) to the importance of the case;
      - (iii) to the complexity of the issues; and
      - (iv) to the financial position of each party;
    - (d) ensuring that it is dealt with expeditiously and fairly; and
    - (e) allotting to it an appropriate share of the court’s resources, while taking into account the need to allot resources to other cases.
- 1.2
  - The court must seek to give effect to the overriding objective when it –
    - (a) exercises any power given to it by the Rules; or
    - (b) interprets any rule.

The rules are written to be intelligible not just to lawyers but also to litigants in person.

=== Part 2: Application and interpretation of the rules ===
The part provides for interpretation of a number of terms used throughout the CPR, the roles of court staff and judges, and issues concerned with time durations and limits. Rule 2.11 is one of a number of rules which make provision for the parties to a dispute to vary the certain rules by written agreement.

=== Part 3: The court's case management powers ===
Such powers include, but are not limited to, a general court power to "extend or shorten the time for compliance with any rule, practice direction or court order", the ability to bring forward or adjourn hearings, to require a party to come to the court, and to hear two or more claims on the same occasion. This part also includes stipulations for those who are not legally represented, gives the court the ability to make orders on "its own initiative" and strike out a statement of case. The court also has the ability to sanction both claimants and defendants, in certain circumstances, and deals with costs management.

=== Part 6: Service of documents ===
Part 6 identifies the valid ways in which legal documents in general, and specifically a claim form, may be served. Personal service to an individual or to an organisation involves giving the document to the individual, to "a person holding a senior position within the company or corporation" or, in the case of a in a business partnership, to one of the partners or to a person who exercises "control or management" of the partnership at its principal place of business.

=== Part 7: Service of a claim form ===
Proceedings are started when the court issues a claim form at the request of the claimant (CPR 7.2). Service of a claim form must take place within four months of the date when the claim form is issued, or within six months if it is to be issued outside the jurisdiction of the court, i.e. outside England and Wales and any part of the territorial waters of the United Kingdom adjoining England and Wales.

=== Part 8: Application for a judicial declaration ===
Part 8 allows for claimants to seek one or more judicial declarations as an alternative to issuing a claim form.

=== Part 17: Amending a claim ===
An addition to or substitution of material in relation to a claim which has already been made is permitted under this part, including where the relevant limitation period has already expired, but a new claim cannot be made outside the relevant period of limitation unless it arises out of "the same facts or substantially the same facts" as the preceding claim.

=== Part 31: Disclosure ===
Part 31 deals with disclosure and inspection of documents. Two types of disclosure are "standard disclosure" and "specific disclosure".

=== Part 40: Judgments and orders ===
Part 40 "sets out rules about judgments and orders which apply except where any other of these Rules makes a different provision in relation to the judgment or order in question". Where a court gives judgment both on a claim and a counterclaim, and judgments sums are specified in both cases, the court has discretion to set off one amount against the other so that a net sum is payable. In the High Court (Chancery Division) case of Fearns v Anglo-Dutch Paint & Chemical Company Ltd & others, George Leggatt QC built on this provision where two sums had been fixed on a claim and a counterclaim, but one sum was expressed in pounds and the other in Euros. He ruled that:

- the date when the two sums could be set off against each other should be "the date on which the existence and amount of the two liabilities is or was established";
- the value of the smaller amount due should be converted into the currency of the larger amount at the exchange rate prevailing on that date.

A single net sum payable could then form the basis of an order for net payment.

=== Assessing proportionality ===
Two approaches to the assessment of proportionality arose in the case of West v Stockport NHS Foundation Trust (2019), in particular on appeal from the initial trial. The appeal judges referred to a "debate between the parties as to whether a proportionality challenge was limited to the circumstances of the particular case ('the narrower interpretation'), or whether it was to be assessed by reference to all the circumstances, and so encompass matters which were not necessarily related to the case in question ('the wider interpretation')". On a reading of CPR 44, which contains general rules about costs, it was felt to be clear that "questions of proportionality are to be considered by reference to the specific matters noted in 44.3(5) and, if relevant, any wider circumstances in 44.4(1). Accordingly, the wider interpretation is correct."

== Tracks ==
=== Small Claims Track ===
Claims for personal injury with a value of not more than £10,000 are usually allocated to the Small Claims Track. There are numerous exceptions to this, for example, claims for personal injury arising from some road traffic accidents cannot exceed lower values. Also dealt with in this track are some claims made by tenants, against landlords, for instance to seek orders for repairs, with the value of those repairs and the amount that may be being claimed for certain damages impacting whether the claim is suitable for this track. A claim for a remedy for harassment or unlawful eviction relating to residential premises will not be allocated to the Small Claims Track even if it meets the financial limits.

=== Fast Track ===
Claims with a financial value of no more than £25,000 (£15,000 for claims issued before 6 April 2009) for which the Small Claims Track is not the normal track are usually allocated to the Fast Track unless: the trial is likely to last for more than one day; oral expert evidence at trial will be in more than two fields; or there will be more than one expert per party in each field.

=== Intermediate Track ===
Cases not allocated to either the Small Claims Track or the Fast Track are usually allocated to the Intermediate Track, with the criteria for this track including that the claim value is for no more than £100,000 and that the trial is expected to last for no more than three days.

=== Multi Track ===
Claims allocated to the Multi Track include mesothelioma or asbestos lung disease claims, some clinical negligence claims, damages claims related to abuse, harm or neglect of vulnerable adults or children and some claims against public authorities and the police.

== Pre-action protocols ==
To support the ethos of narrowing the issues prior to the use of proceedings and encapsulate best practice, the CPR introduced "pre-action protocols". They are given force by the Practice Direction – Pre-Action Conduct and Protocols.

=== Purpose ===
Pre-action protocols outline the steps that parties should take in particular types of disputes to seek information from, and to provide information to, each other prior to making a legal claim, with the complainant setting out their claim in full to the defendant and both parties making an attempt to negotiate a settlement. The emphasis is placed on co-operation to identify the main issues. Failure to co-operate may lead to cost penalties, regardless of the eventual outcomes of the case.

Paragraph 1 of the Practice Direction defines the purpose of pre-action protocols as:

- encouraging the early exchange of all information relating to the prospective legal claim
- aiding settlement of the claim without the commencement of proceedings
- producing a foundation for efficient case management where litigation cannot be avoided

=== Current pre-action protocols ===
Protocol	Publication	Came into Force
Construction and Engineering Disputes	September 2000	Second edition came into force on 9 November 2016.
Defamation	September 2000	2 October 2000
Disease and Illness Claims	September 2003	8 December 2003
Disrepair Cases	September 2003	8 December 2003
Judicial Review	3 December 2001	4 March 2002; Amended 1 July 2013
Personal Injury Claims	January 1999	26 April 1999
Possession claims based on Rent Arrears	September 2006	2 October 2006
Professional Negligence	May 2001	16 July 2001
Resolution of Clinical Disputes (previously called Clinical Negligence)	January 1999	26 April 1999

=== Penalties ===
Paragraph 2 indicates that the Court may add terms to any order if it feels a party has breached a protocol. These will place parties in the same position as if the breach had not occurred (or as close as possible).

The court may, amongst other remedies, order that the party in breach:

- pay some or all of the costs of another party
- pay costs to another party on an indemnity rather than standard basis
- pay a higher rate of interest on particular damages awarded, or for a particular period.
- forgo interest on a particular item of damages or for a period.

For instance, where a party commences proceedings prior to supplying important information to the other party(s) then the Court might disallow interest for the period prior to the information being provided.

In addition, the protocol might provide grounds to show a party had or had not behaved so unreasonably as to merit penalty under another Rule (for instance CPR 44.3).

=== Cases not covered by a protocol ===
Where no protocol has been published Paragraph 4 states that parties should conform to CPR 1 and the Overriding Objective.

It also sets out what would normally be considered reasonable behaviour prior to issue.

Where a case has been commenced prior to the protocol coming into force, but after publication the protocol is not binding. However, the degree to which a party has attempted to follow it anyway might be persuasive.

== Creation of the rules ==
Section 2 of the Civil Procedure Act 1997 requires that the CPR are made by a committee called the Civil Procedure Rule Committee. Members of the committee consist of:

Ex officio:

- the Master of the Rolls/Head of Civil Justice
- the Deputy Head of Civil Justice (if there is one)

Those appointed by the Lord Chief Justice:

- either two or three judges of the Senior Courts
- one Circuit judge
- either one or two district judges
- one person who is a Master referred to in Part II of schedule 2 to the Senior Courts Act 1981

Those appointed by the Lord Chancellor:

- three persons who have a Supreme Court qualification (within the meaning of section 71 of the Courts and Legal Services Act 1990 (CLSA)), including at least one with particular experience of practice in the County Court
- Three persons who have been authorised by a relevant approved regulator to conduct litigation in relation to all proceedings in the Senior Courts, including at least one with particular experience of practice in the County Court
- two persons with experience in and knowledge of the lay advice sector or consumer affairs.

The Lord Chancellor's appointments are made in consultation with the Lord Chief Justice and all authorised bodies which have members who are eligible for appointment.

=== Rulemaking procedure ===
Rules must be approved by at least eight members of the committee, and submitted to the Lord Chancellor who may allow or disallow them. Where he decides to disallow, he must express his reasons for doing so in writing.

== Changes to legal terminology ==
England and Wales began to diverge from the common law (and from other common law jurisdictions) with the Rules of the Supreme Court in 1883, which replaced the traditional "complaint" and "answer" with the "statement of claim" and "defence".

The CPR went much further by replacing several dozen traditional legal terms. For example, the "writ of summons" and the "statement of claim" were replaced, respectively, with "claim form" and "particulars of claim".

The CPR implemented a new system of radically different legal terminology in order to bring plain English to the legal system of England and Wales. This was intended to help laypersons comprehend legal terms more easily and to make the judicial process faster and less expensive. However, Bryan A. Garner has noted that the new system seems to have replaced "old jargon with new, even less-comprehensible jargon".

== See also ==
- Civil Jurisdiction and Judgments Act 1982
- Lord Woolf
- Practice Direction

== Bibliography ==
- Dwyer, D, The Civil Procedure Rules Ten Years On, Oxford University Press (2009).
