= McKenzie friend =

Non-lawyer who assists a party to a legal matter

A McKenzie friend assists a litigant in person in a court of law in Australia, Canada, England and Wales, Scotland, Hong Kong, Northern Ireland, the Republic of Ireland, and New Zealand, by prompting, taking notes, and quietly giving advice. They need not be legally trained or have any professional legal qualifications.

McKenzie friends are most commonly used in family courts by people who cannot obtain legal aid or afford professional legal representation, helping them navigate complex procedures without acting as a substitute for a qualified lawyer.

They do not have rights of audience or conduct litigation unless specifically granted by the court.

McKenzie friends often assist in family law matters, including divorce proceedings, child arrangements, and financial remedy hearings. Their support can also extend to other areas of law where individuals represent themselves, such as civil disputes, employment tribunals, and small claims cases. While they cannot act as a substitute for a qualified lawyer, their role is to help litigants understand procedures, organise documents, and feel supported during hearings.

The right to a McKenzie friend was established in the 1970 case of McKenzie v McKenzie. Although in many cases a McKenzie friend may be an actual friend, it is often somebody with knowledge of the area and the presumption is heavily in favour of admitting a McKenzie friend into court. He or she may be liable for any misleading advice given to the litigant in person but may not be covered by professional indemnity insurance.

A similar, modified principle exists in Singapore. The role is distinct from that of a next friend or of an amicus curiae.

== Origin ==
McKenzie v. McKenzie was a divorce case in England in 1969. Levine McKenzie, who was petitioning for divorce, had been legally aided but the legal aid had been withdrawn before the case went to court. Unable to fund legal representation, McKenzie had broken off contact with his solicitors, Jeffrey Gordon & Co. However, one day before the hearing, Jeffrey Gordon sent the case to an Australian barrister in London, Ian Hanger, whose qualifications in law in Australia did not allow him to practise as a barrister in London. Hanger hoped to sit with his client to prompt him, take notes and suggest questions in cross-examination, thereby providing what quiet assistance he could from the bar table to a man representing himself. The trial judge ordered Hanger not to take any active part in the case (except to advise McKenzie during adjournments) and to sit in the public gallery of the court. Hanger assumed his limited role was futile and did not return for the second day of the trial.

The case went against McKenzie, who then appealed to the Court of Appeal on the basis that he had been denied representation. On 12 June 1970, the Court of Appeal ruled that the judge's intervention had deprived McKenzie of the assistance to which he was entitled and ordered a retrial.

As of 2022, Ian Hanger AM KC, the original McKenzie friend, is a King's Counsel (KC) at the Queensland Bar.

== In specific jurisdictions ==
=== Singapore ===
In September 2006, the Subordinate Courts of Singapore started a pilot project called the Lay Assistant Scheme in which persons, usually with some legal knowledge, attend hearings with litigants who are not represented by lawyers to advise them on non-legal issues and help them with administrative tasks. The scheme, a modification of the UK's McKenzie friend system, is intended to assist litigants who are not eligible for legal aid as they have an annual salary exceeding S$10,000 but cannot afford a lawyer. For the litigant to qualify, the other party must be legally represented.

Lay assistants are not allowed to act as lawyers and may not address the court; any breach of court rules may render them liable to a maximum fine of $1,000 or imprisonment of up to six months.

Plans for introducing McKenzie friends in court proceedings were first announced by Chief Justice Chan Sek Keong in May 2006. Students from the Pro Bono Group of the Faculty of Law, National University of Singapore, have been participating in the scheme.

=== England and Wales ===
In English courts, where a case is being heard in private, the use of a McKenzie friend has sometimes been contentious. This is a particular problem in family court hearings, where it has been held that the nature of the case is so confidential that no one other than the litigants and their professional legal representatives should be admitted to the court.

A 2005 Court of Appeal case, In the matter of the children of Mr O'Connell, Mr Whelan and Mr Watson, clarified the law in this area. The result of the appeal has legitimised the use of McKenzie friends in the family court and allowed the litigant to disclose confidential court papers to the McKenzie friend.

England and Wales allow fee-charging McKenzie friends, who may charge for their services, including the giving of legal advice. A recent report by the Legal Service Consumer Panel found that fee charging McKenzie friends were a net benefit. The report stated, "They should be viewed as providing valuable support that improves access to justice in the large majority of cases."

=== Scotland ===
The legal system in England and Wales differs from that in Scotland. The first recorded use of McKenzie friends in Scotland was in April 2007 in the case TB & AM v The Authority Reporter. The one major difference between England and Scotland is that in Scotland McKenzie friends are not permitted to receive remuneration.

=== Ireland ===
Litigants in Ireland before The Court of Appeal and The High Court may obtain "quiet advice" from a lay person, but judges may refuse to permit such assistance where "the interests of justice and fairness do not require the litigant to receive such assistance". Furthermore, the lay person may not receive payment for their assistance.

== See also ==
- Duty solicitor
- Support Through Court
- Legal advisor
