= Airline seat =

Seat of an airliner for passengers

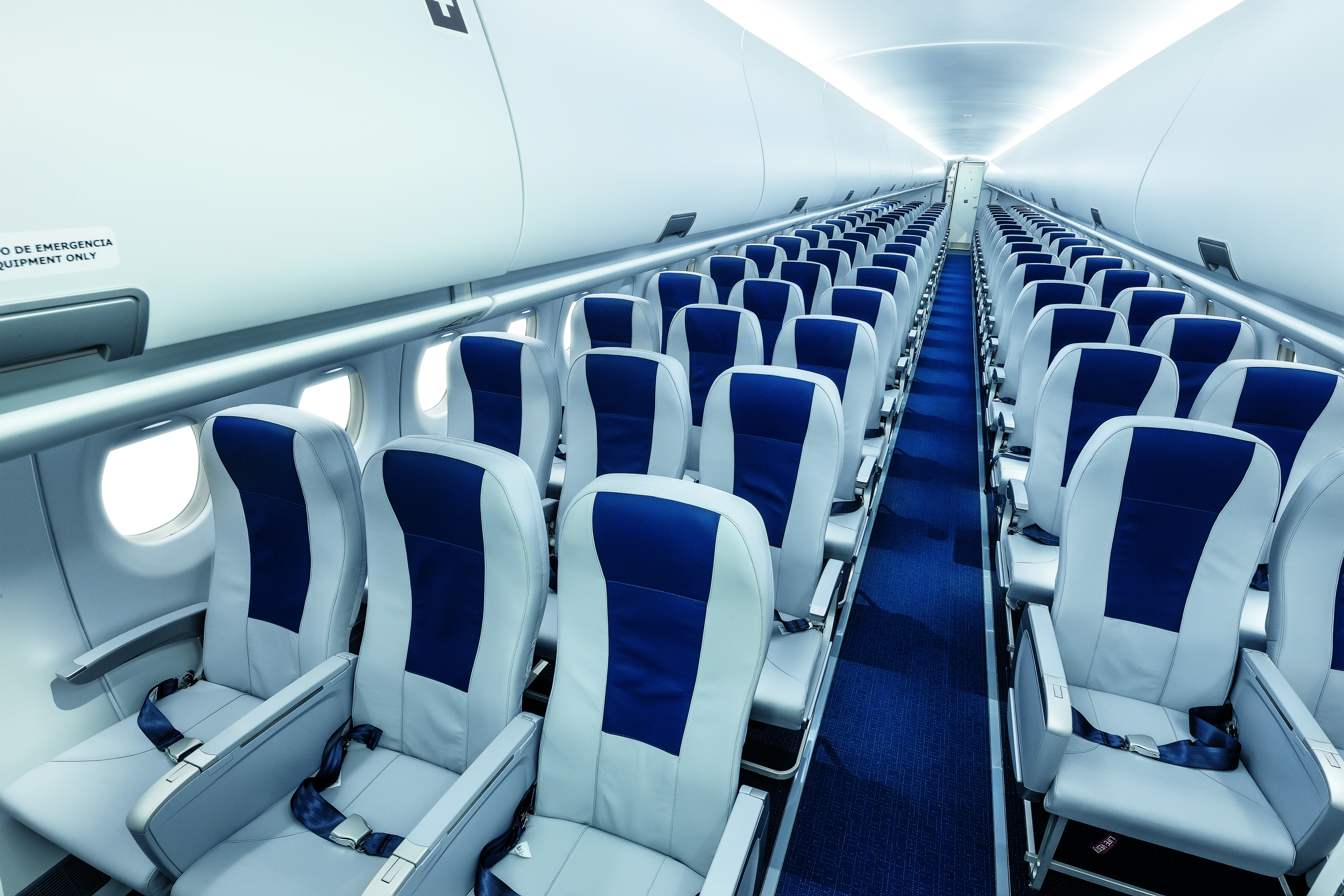
Passenger seats aboard a Sukhoi Superjet 100

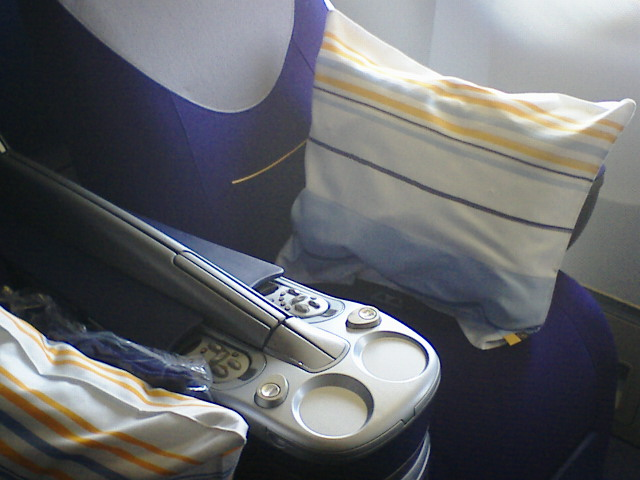
Business class seat in a seat Lufthansa Boeing 747-400

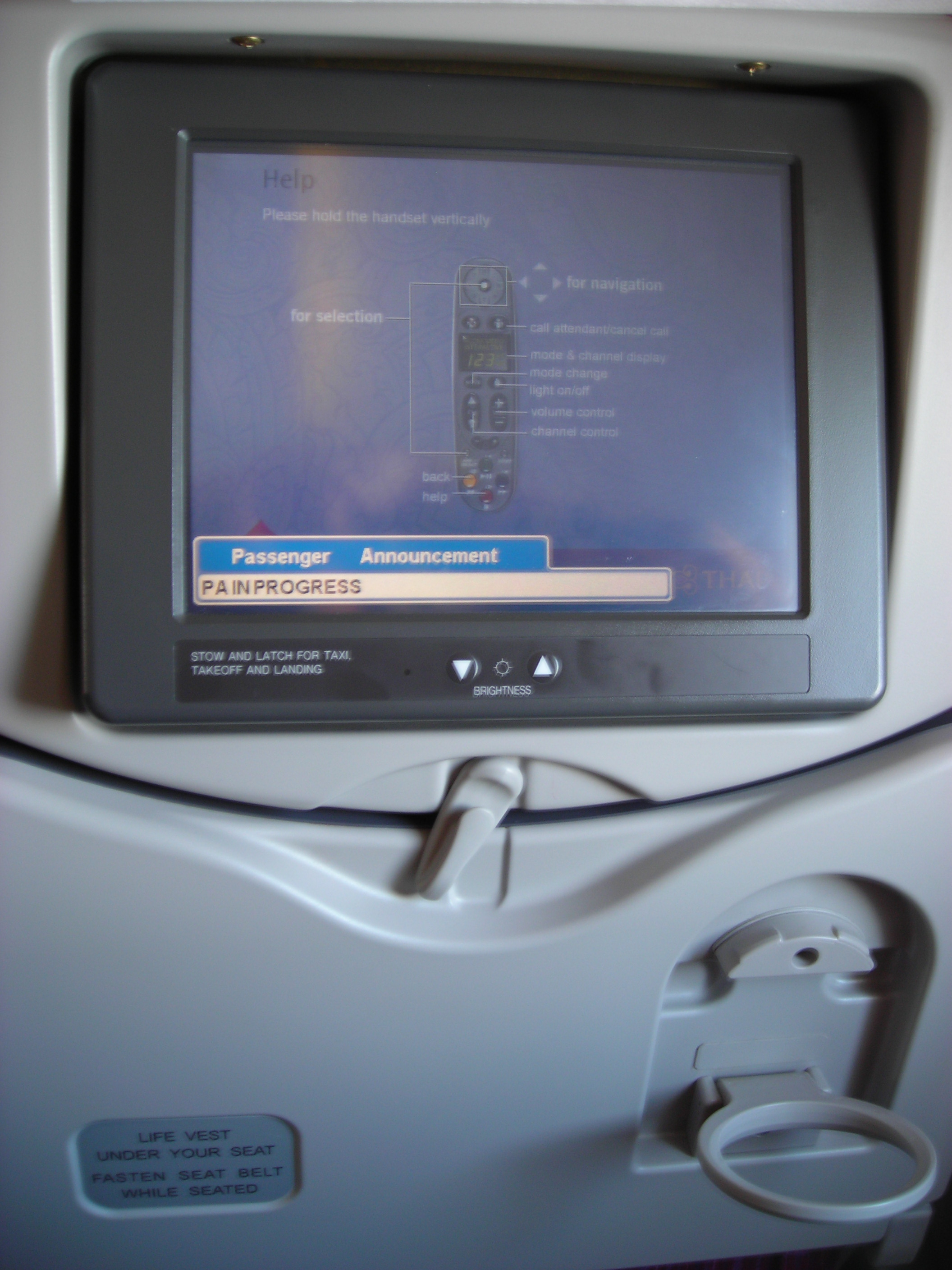
Control screen fixed to an economy class airline seat (Thai Airways International Airbus A340); the tray is stowed.

An airline seat is a seat on an airliner in which passengers are accommodated for the duration of the journey. Such seats are usually arranged in rows running across the airplane's fuselage. A diagram of such seats in an aircraft is called an aircraft seat map. Within the industry, this map is known as a LOPA (Layout-Passenger Accommodation).

== Features and amenities ==
Seats are attached to rails underneath the floor which run along the aircraft fuselage. If the airline wants to reconfigure the seating, this is a minor operation. For passenger safety, all airline seats are equipped with seatbelts.

=== Basic amenities ===
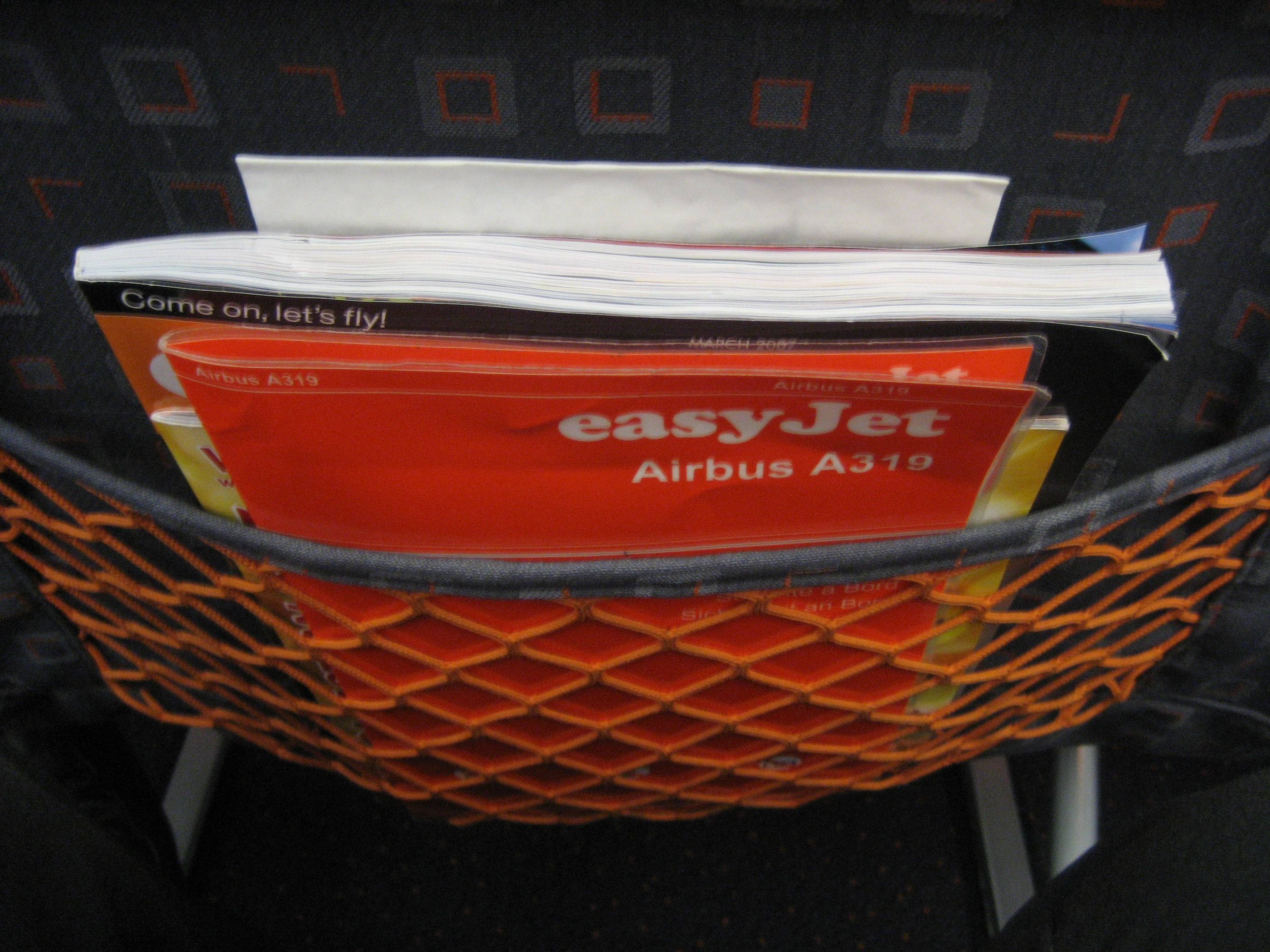
A seat pocket on an EasyJet Airbus A319 plane containing a safety card, magazines, and an airsickness bag

Seats are frequently equipped with further amenities. Airline seats may be equipped with reclining mechanisms for increased passenger comfort, either reclining mechanically (usually in economy class and short-haul first and business class), or electrically (usually in long-haul first class and business class). Most aircraft also feature trays for eating and reading, in, either, the seatback, which folds down to form small tables in most economy class seats, or armrest, which folds out in most first class, business class, bulkhead, and exit row seats. Most airline seats also feature pockets, which may contain an in-flight magazine and safety instructions.

On small and short-haul aircraft, or on low-cost carriers, some of these amenities may not be installed. For instance, on several aircraft, Ryanair has installed non-reclining seats without seat pockets with the safety manuals stitched to the seat back instead. Even on airliners with reclining seats, some seats may have restricted or no reclines. Typically, this will be in the rear row of the cabin, where rear bulkheads block the recline, or seats immediately in front of the emergency exit, where reclining seats might restrict access to the emergency exit, creating potential evacuation and other safety hazards. Independent seat review sites such as SeatGuru often warn passengers against these seats. During take-off and landing, the crew asks passengers to put their seats in an "upright" (unreclined) position and lift and stow their tray tables.

=== Advanced amenities ===
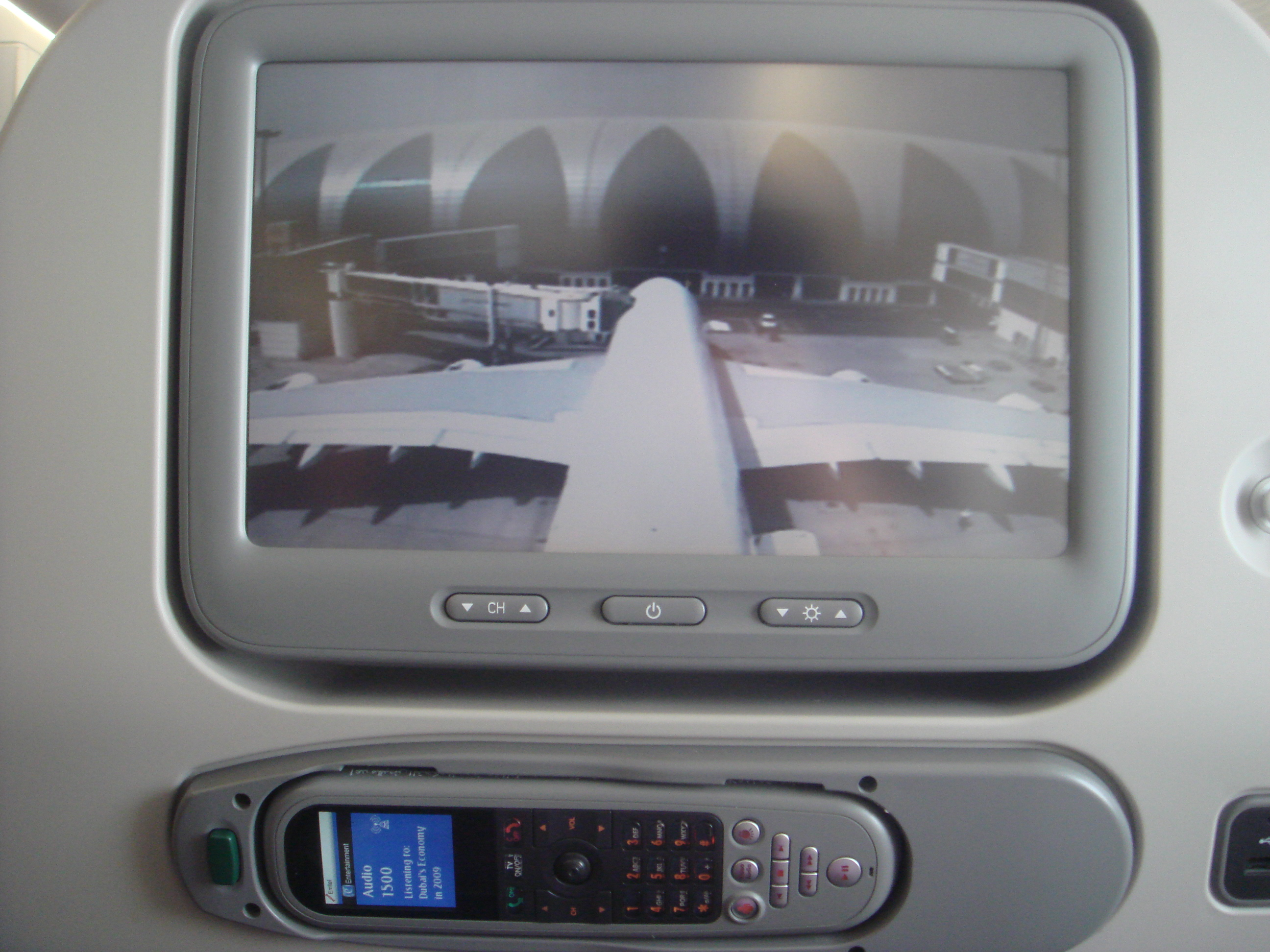
The personal entertainment system (ICE) on an Emirates Airbus A380 showing the view of Dubai International Airport from the tail-mounted camera

==== Electronics ====
Seats may be equipped with power ports (either EmPower, AC, DC, or USB power-only sockets) for small electrical appliances and ports for headphones for the audio entertainment. Most full-service airlines also include personal video screens as part of the in-flight entertainment system on long-haul aircraft - but some aircraft use a bring-your-own-device system where passengers use their own devices. The screens are often touchscreens or can be controlled by remote handsets. In economy and premium economy, the screen is normally in a seatback, but in a front row seat or premium cabin, they may need to be pulled out from a special compartment after takeoff, and then returned there for landing.

==== Adjustable headrests ====
Most long-haul aircraft (and short-haul aircraft on some airlines) feature seats with adjustable headrests in all classes, allowing the passenger to adjust the headrest for comfort.

==== Adjustable lumbar support ====
Electrically adjustable lumbar support is found on most long-haul first-class and business-class seats. Rarely, economy class may also include a mechanically adjustable lumbar support on some long-haul aircraft. However, with the trend towards slimline seats in economy class, this amenity has mostly vanished from most new economy class seat installations.

==== Massage ====
Some business class seats, such as the Recaro CL 4420, have a built-in massaging feature.

==== Lie flat/flat bed seating ====
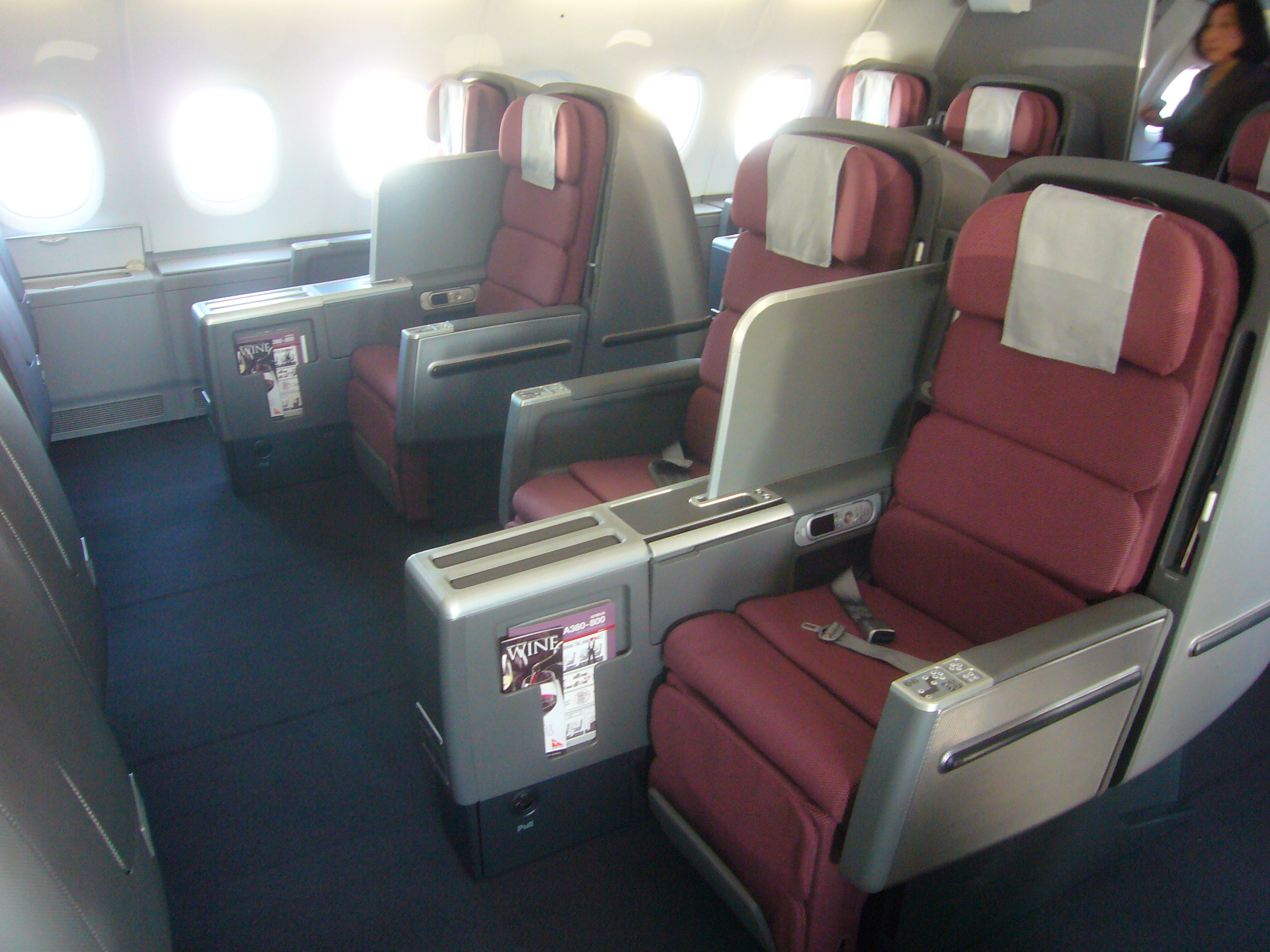
Qantas "Skybed" business class seat

Some business class cabins feature seats that recline to a sloped flat position. These "lie flat at an angle" seats allow for greater comfort than traditional recliner seats, but are less comfortable than fully horizontal flat bed seating.

Most international first-class and a growing number of international business-class cabins feature seats which recline to a full-horizontal flat position, forming a bed.

==== "Slimline" economy seating ====
Some airlines are introducing new "slimline" seats in economy class. While "slimline" is not a defined term, slimline seats have less padding in the back.

Slimline seats weigh less than full-size seats, and are claimed to allow airlines to increase capacity without significantly affecting passenger comfort. Many passengers, however, have expressed displeasure with these seats. Moreover, the US Department of Transportation (DOT) has begun to explore the safety issues associated with increased aircraft capacity and reduced seat pitch that results from the installation of "slimline" seats. In an 14 April 2015 hearing of the DOT's Advisory Committee for Aviation Consumer Protection, Cynthia Corbett, an investigator for the Federal Aviation Administration (FAA) Civil Aerospace Medical Institute, discussed concerns regarding the emergency evacuation of higher capacity aircraft. The citizens' group "Flyers Rights" brought a case against the FAA in 2017, arguing that the agency had a responsibility to prevent seats from becoming so cramped as to become a safety issue in an emergency.

This type of seat was pioneered by Recaro, but several other manufacturers (such as Weber Aircraft LLC and B/E Aerospace) have introduced their own slimline seats as well. These seats may or may not feature moveable headrests, and generally do not feature adjustable lumbar support.

A newer innovation by Zodiac Seats U.S. (formerly Weber Aircraft LLC) is an articulating seat bottom, where the seat bottom moves forward in addition to the seat back tilting backwards. Such seats have been installed in some of the aircraft of Aer Lingus, Delta Air Lines, Emirates, American Airlines, and Avianca, amongst others. This seating was eventually adopted by competitors such as B/E Aerospace and Recaro.

== Seating layout ==
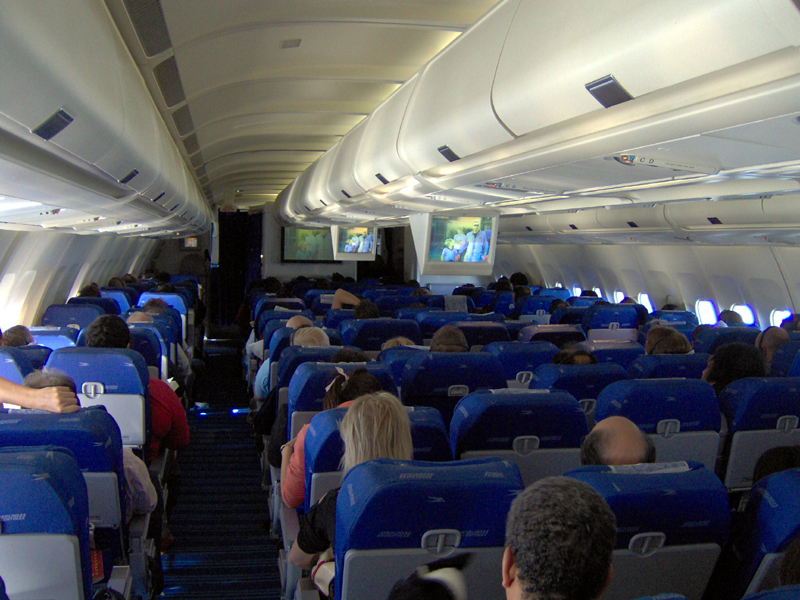
2+4+2 seating layout on an Aerolíneas Argentinas wide body jet (Airbus A340-200)

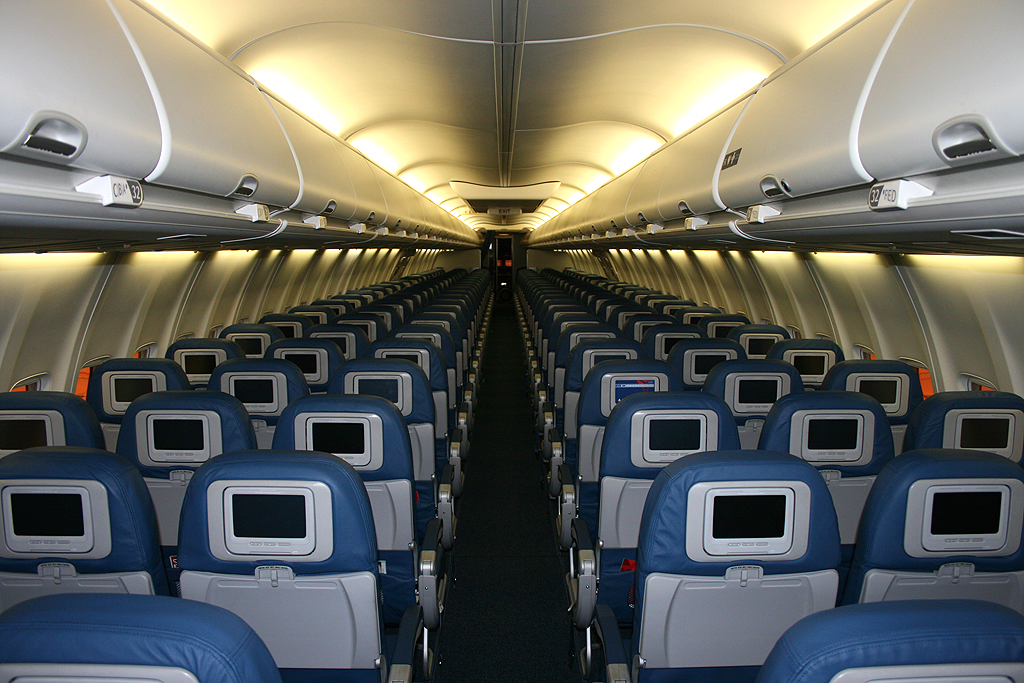
3+3 seating layout on a Delta Air Lines narrow body jet (Boeing 737-800) with Zodiac Aerospace model 5751 slimline seats

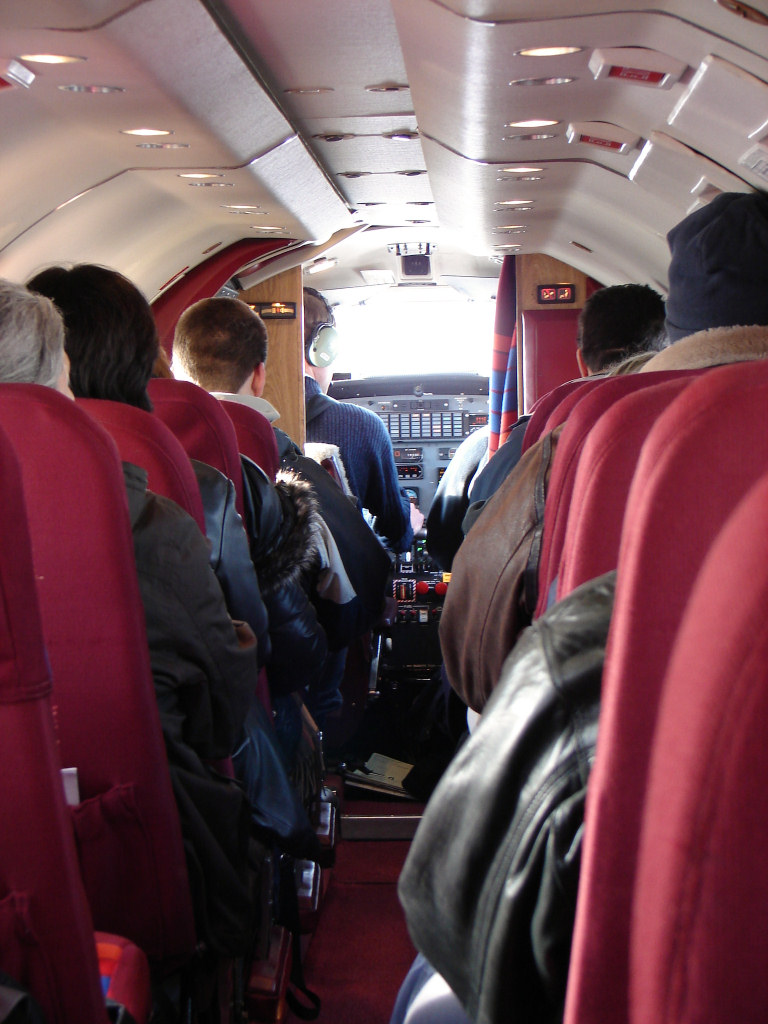
1+1 seating in a Fairchild Swearingen Metroliner

Airline cabins are frequently classified as narrow-body if there is a single aisle with seats on either side, or wide-body if there are two aisles with a block of seats between them in addition to the seats on the side.

The number of seats abreast is affected by the aircraft width. On very small aircraft such as the Beechcraft 1900 there are only individual seats on each side of the aisle (1+1 seating). The widest narrow body aircraft such as the Airbus A320 family and Boeing 737 aircraft have six abreast seating in a 3+3 layout. Asymmetrical layouts also exist, examples including the Embraer Regional Jet which has 1+2 seating while the Douglas DC-9, Sukhoi Superjet 100 and Airbus A220 aircraft typically feature 2+3 seating.

On wide body-aircraft the center block of seats between the aisles can have as many as 5 seats on planes like the layout on most McDonnell Douglas DC-10 and some Boeing 777 aircraft, although Boeing recommends the 3+3+3 over the 2+5+2 layout. Very wide planes such as the Boeing 747 or the Airbus A380 have ten seats abreast, typically in a 3+4+3 layout, although this layout is also sometimes used as a high density layout on aircraft normally seating nine abreast, such as the 777 or DC-10. Recently, airlines have been adopting ten abreast seating on the Boeing 777-300 aircraft. On the Boeing 787, a nine seat 3+3+3 layout has been adopted as the norm by all carriers with the exception of an eight seat 2+4+2 layout on Japan Airlines that afforded a more spacious seating experience for its passengers.

While there are some exceptions, most commercial aircraft seats are forward-facing, and on military aircraft, seats are frequently rearward-facing. Southwest Airlines previously offered a few rearward-facing seats on some aircraft but that scheme has now ended. Rearward-facing seats are also common on business jets, to provide a conference-type layout. British Airways, United Airlines, and American Airlines also have rearward-facing seats in their Club World (except in the A350), domestic 777-200 United First and (select) Business Class Cabins, respectively. It has been argued that rearward-facing seats are safer, because in the event of a crash, the sudden deceleration will propel the passenger into a rearward-facing seat instead of out of it, meaning the force is distributed over the entire seat back, instead of the straps of the seat belt. The argument against such seats has been based on passenger comfort, safety, and cost. It could be argued that passengers who desire the natural layout of forward-facing seats may be uncomfortable with a rearward layout. On the safety aspect, the argument has been that during a plane crash, debris, such as luggage, will fly forward in the cabin, quite possibly into the passengers in rearward-facing seats. On the cost aspect, rearward-facing seats need additional strengthening, which adds extra weight and therefore higher fuel costs.

Many airlines provide maps of their seating configurations on the various aircraft they fly. For airlines which don't have seat maps, websites like SeatGuru show seat maps for the aforementioned airlines.

=== Arrangement ===
Window seats are located at the sides of the aircraft, and usually next to a window, although some aircraft have seat rows where there is a window missing. Window seats are preferred by passengers who want to have a view, or wall, which they can lean against. Passengers in seats adjacent to the aisle have the advantage of being able to leave the seat without having to clamber over the other passengers, and having an aisle they can stretch their legs into. If a seat block has three or more seats, there will also be middle seats, which are unpopular because the passenger is wedged between the other two passengers, without the advantages of either window or aisle seats. Middle seats are typically booked last.

== Seat size ==
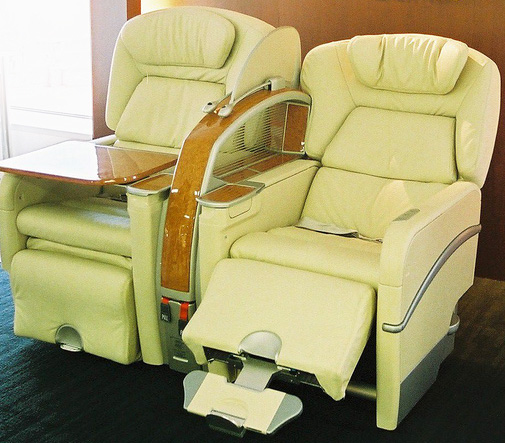
JAL First Class domestic seats (2007)

When evaluating the size (and comfort) of a seat, the main terms used are pitch and width. No minimum limits have been prescribed by aviation authorities for seat sizing on transport category aircraft.

It was reported in 2016 that the average distance between seat rows (pitch) had declined to 79 centimetres (31 in), from over 89 centimetres (35 in), while the average seat width had shrunk to 43 centimetres (17 in) from 46 centimetres (18 in) in the previous two decades.

=== Seat pitch ===
Seat pitch is defined as the space between a point on one seat and the same point on the seat in front of it. In almost all cases, seat pitch increases with class of travel (economy, business, first, etc.) For many carriers, the pitch in economy class is 29 to 32 inches (74 to 81 cm). Legroom depends upon seat pitch and the thickness of the seat back. Airlines have claimed that a reduction of seat pitch can be compensated for by a thinner seat-back design.

American Airlines' business class seat pitches in their former Boeing 767-200s were 62 inches (160 cm), the largest in any short-haul business class. US Airways, now merged with American Airlines, had first-class flatbed seats in their Airbus A330-300s with a seat pitch of 94 inches (2 inches short of 8 feet) or 240 cm (2.4 meters)

In 2010 the seat pitch on low-cost carriers could be as low as 28 inches (71 cm) in the case of Spirit Airlines but was typically 29 inches (74 cm) or 30 inches (76 cm).

=== Seat width ===
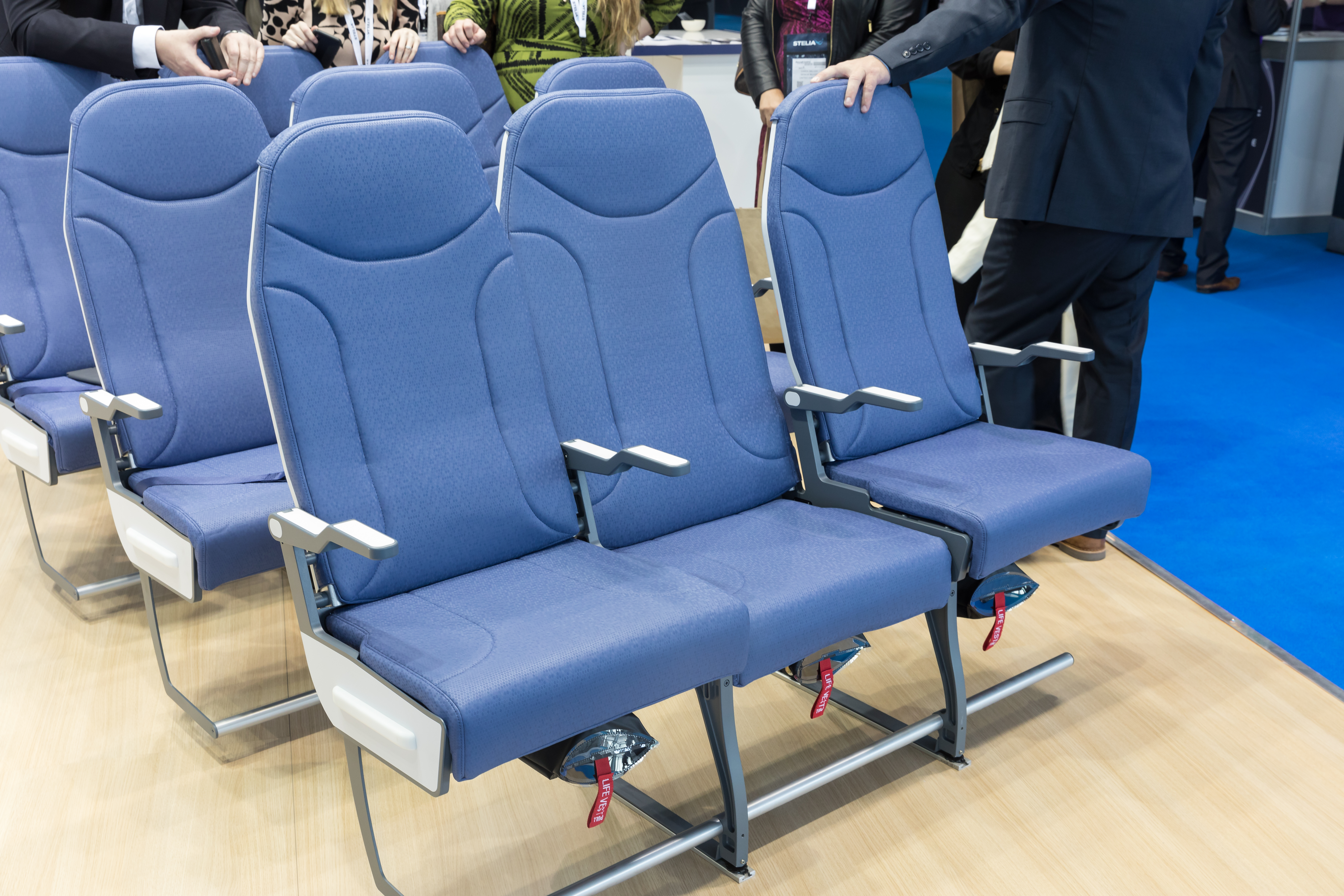
Economy class seats with varying seat width (more width for the middle seat, less width for the window seat)

There is some ambiguity about the meaning of "seat width". It can be taken as the width enclosed by the armrests on each side, i.e., the width available to sit in, or as the distance from the midpoint of one armrest to the midpoint of the next, a larger figure by the width of an armrest, and the width available for the shoulders (it is also one-third of the width of a block of three identical seats). It is thought that most airlines use the first of these figures. In Economy class this width was typically 43 to 46 centimeters (17 to 18 in) in 2003.

In 2013, Airbus said, for long haul flights, there should be an industry standard for a minimum seat width of 18 inches in economy cabins, but its rival Boeing argued it was up for airlines to decide. People have been getting wider: the weight of the average American male in his 40s had increased by 10 percent in the 30 years from the 1970 introduction of the Boeing 747. The narrower 17-inch-wide seat favoured by Boeing is a legacy from the 1950s when passenger jets were first introduced. In the 1970s and 1980s with the introduction of the Boeing 747 and the first Airbus jets, 18 inches become standard for long-haul flights. Seats were widened to 18.5 inches with the Boeing 777 in the 1990s and A380 superjumbo in the 2000s. Many airlines are adopting lighter 17-inch-wide seats on their Boeing 777 and 787 and 18-inch seats for A350s. Although for almost 20 years, the standard setup in the back of a Boeing 777 was nine seats per row, in 2012 nearly 70% of the biggest version of that plane were delivered with 10-abreast seating. When Airbus introduced its A380, it offered 10-abreast seating, giving each passenger up to 19 inches of hip space. In 2013, ten airlines fly Airbus A330 with nine 16.7-inch seats in each row, rather than the eight it was designed for. A research report commissioned by Airbus concluded that an extra inch in seat width improves sleep quality by 53 percent.

Seat width has varied over time. In 1985 none of the main four US carriers offered a seat less than 19 inches wide. From 2000 to 2018, average seat width decreased from 18.5 to 17 inches, and sometimes as low as 16.1 inches. In 2023, it was noted that seat widths began increasing but legroom decreased.

=== Aisle chair ===
Flight boarding for a passenger in a wheelchair

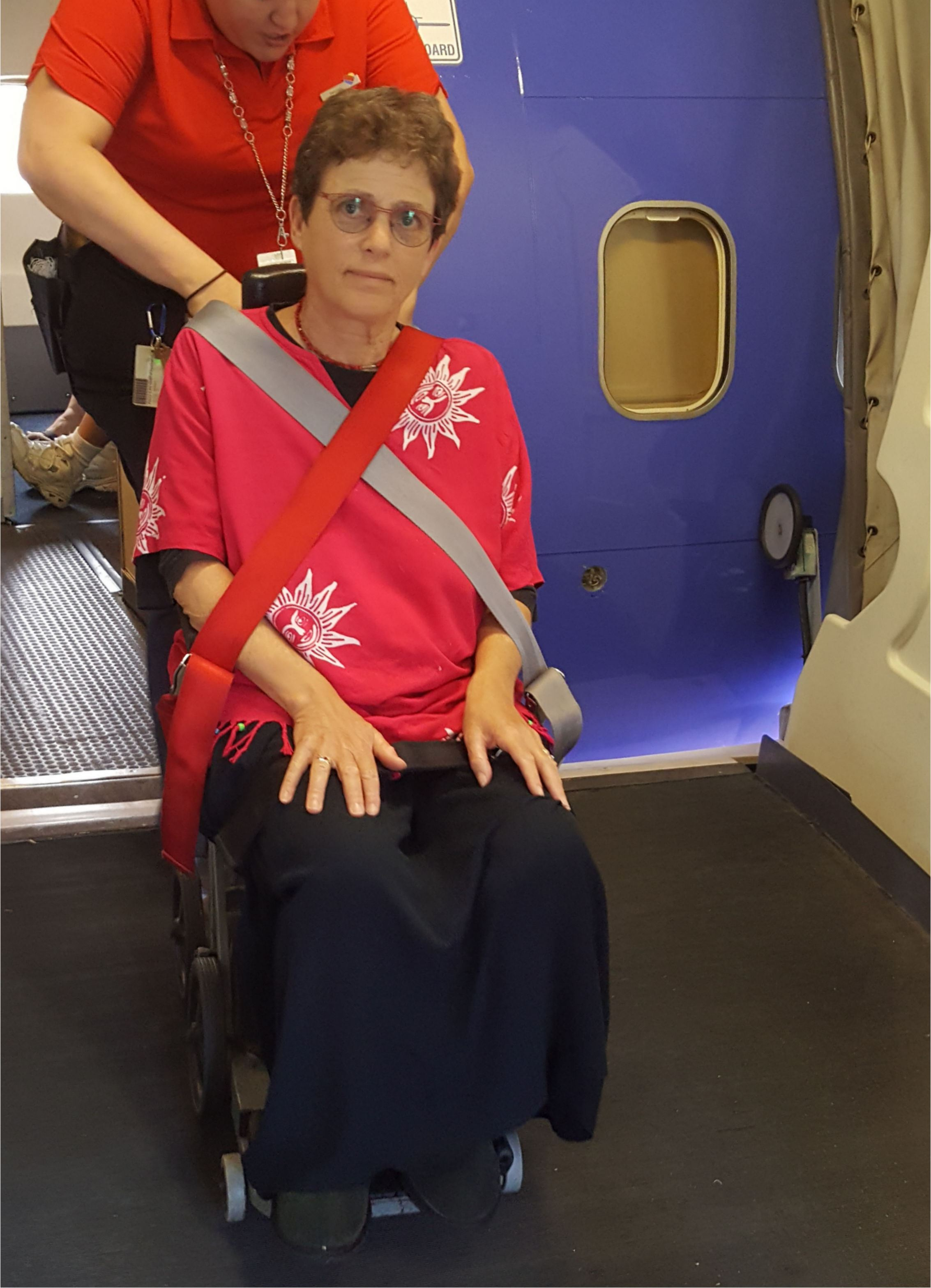
A passenger triple-strapped into an "aisle chair" for assisted boarding

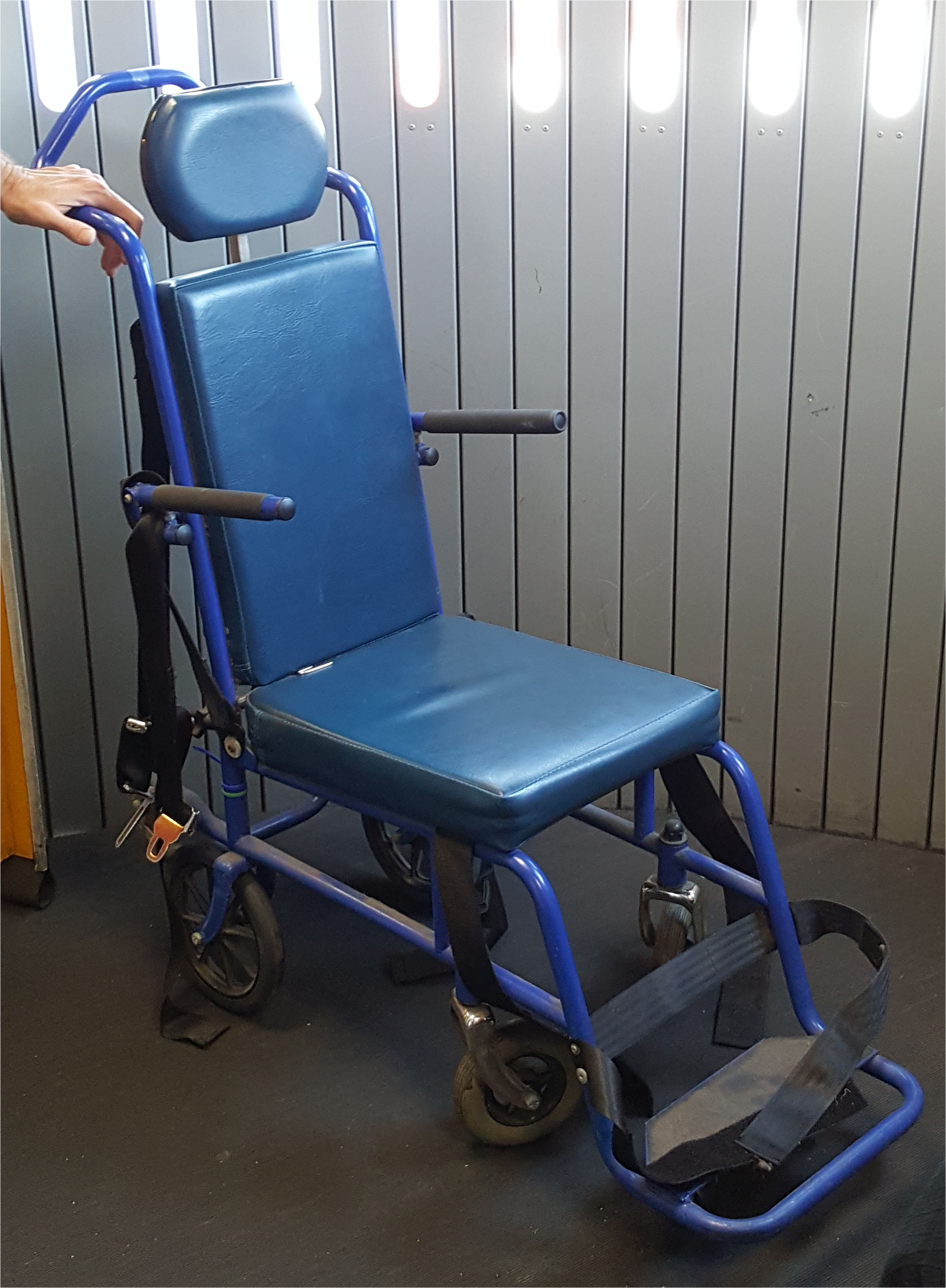
An aisle chair

An airplane "aisle chair" is a mobile seat provided by airlines for passengers who require the use of a wheelchair. While most trains, buses and other forms of public transportation have space for a passenger's own wheelchair for seating and a ramp or lift assist for boarding, airplane aisles are too narrow for conventional wheelchairs. The aisle chair affords the wheelchair passenger assisted mobility in boarding and disembarking, and in-flight movement within the cabin such as to the lavatory.

== Material ==
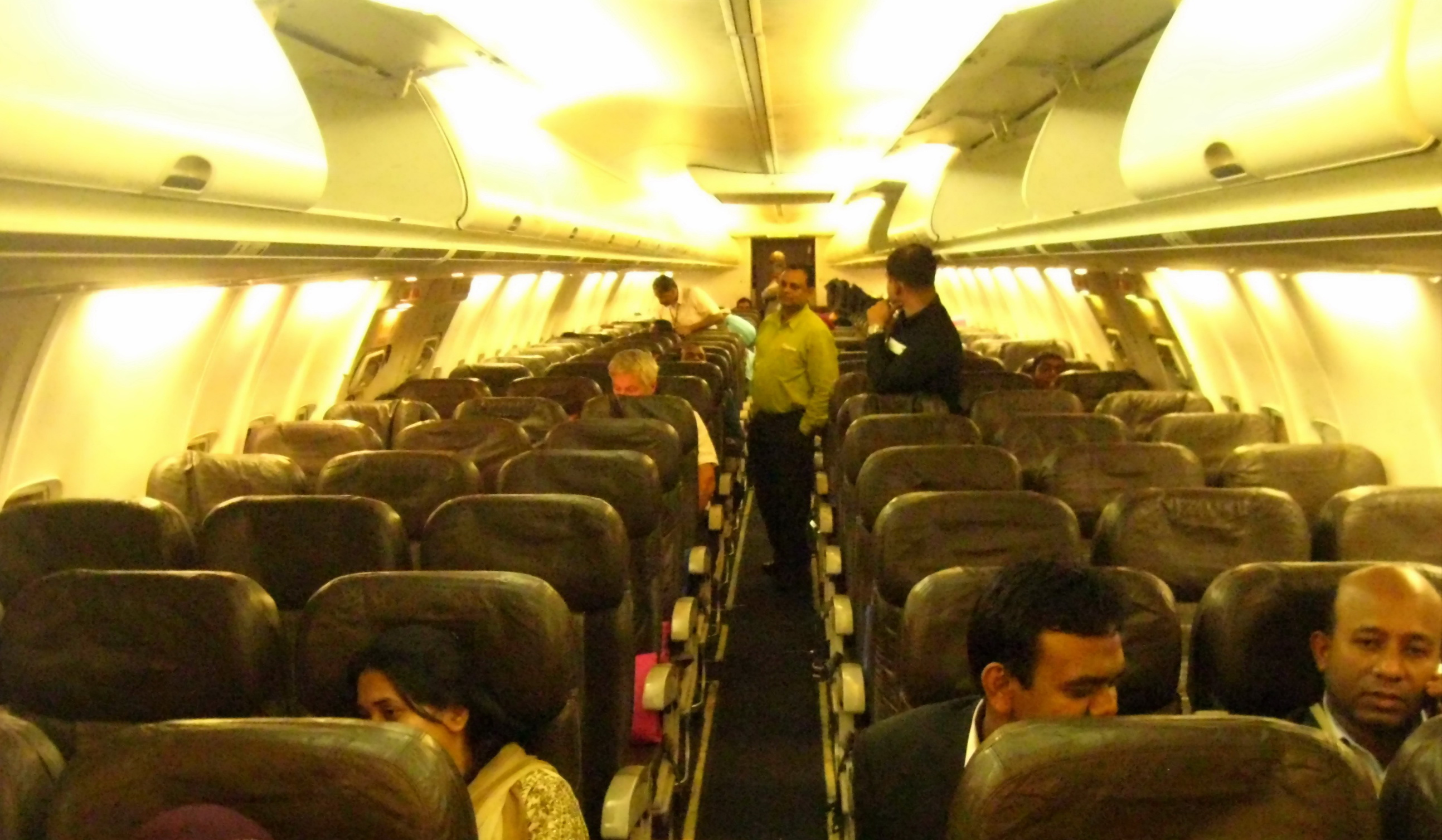
Costlier leather seats are used in Biman Bangladesh Airlines' Boeing 737-800. Besides adding luxury, two main reasons for using leather seats are that the material is easy to clean and that it prevents soaking of spilt liquid into padding.

Airline seats are designed to be lightweight, but at the same time strong and fire resistant, while also taking into account passenger comfort. A typical design is an aluminium frame with blocks of polyurethane foam attached to it. In some cases a layer of fire-resistant fabric, for instance Kevlar or Nomex goes over this, and at the top is a layer of cloth or leather.

Leather seats are more costly than traditional cloth seats. Even so, several airlines, including low-cost carriers, choose leather not only to present a more "luxurious" product, but also because such seats are easier to clean and prevent spilt liquids from soaking through to the padding for reduced turnaround issues.

== Color ==
In the fairly early days of aviation, airline seats were typically of soft, earthy colors such as light browns and gray, which were intended to calm the passengers. During the 1970s, brighter colors such as red and orange became more commonplace. After this, shades of blue and gray, with a more business-like tone, became the most common choice. However, certain airlines such as Austrian Airlines, Emirates and Singapore Airlines still use soft colours on seats.

== Auxiliary ==
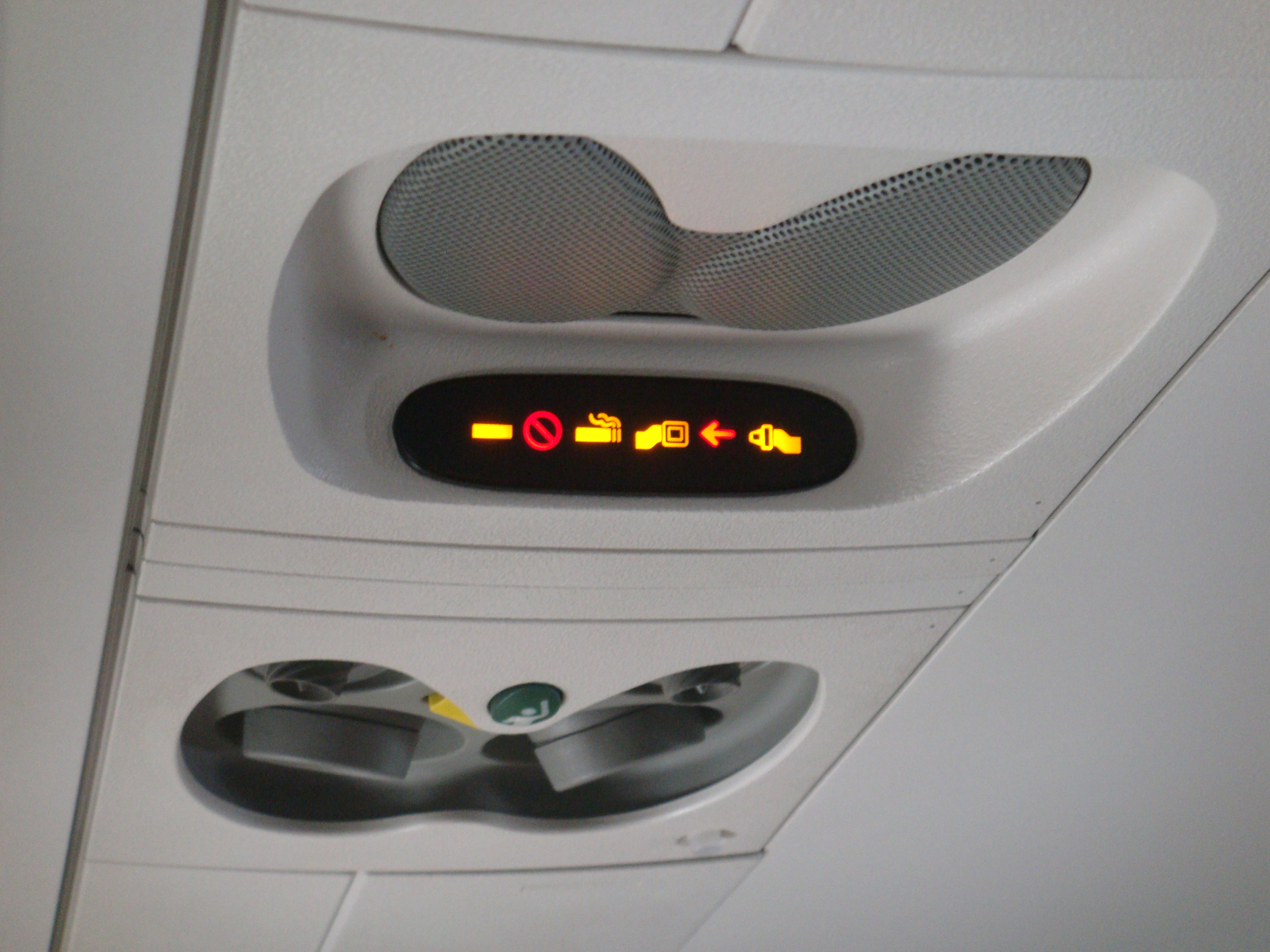
Passenger signs, lights, and vent nozzles on a Bombardier CRJ200. The speakers are ahead of the seat belt lights in this perspective, and the attendant call button is the oval button ahead of the reading lights.

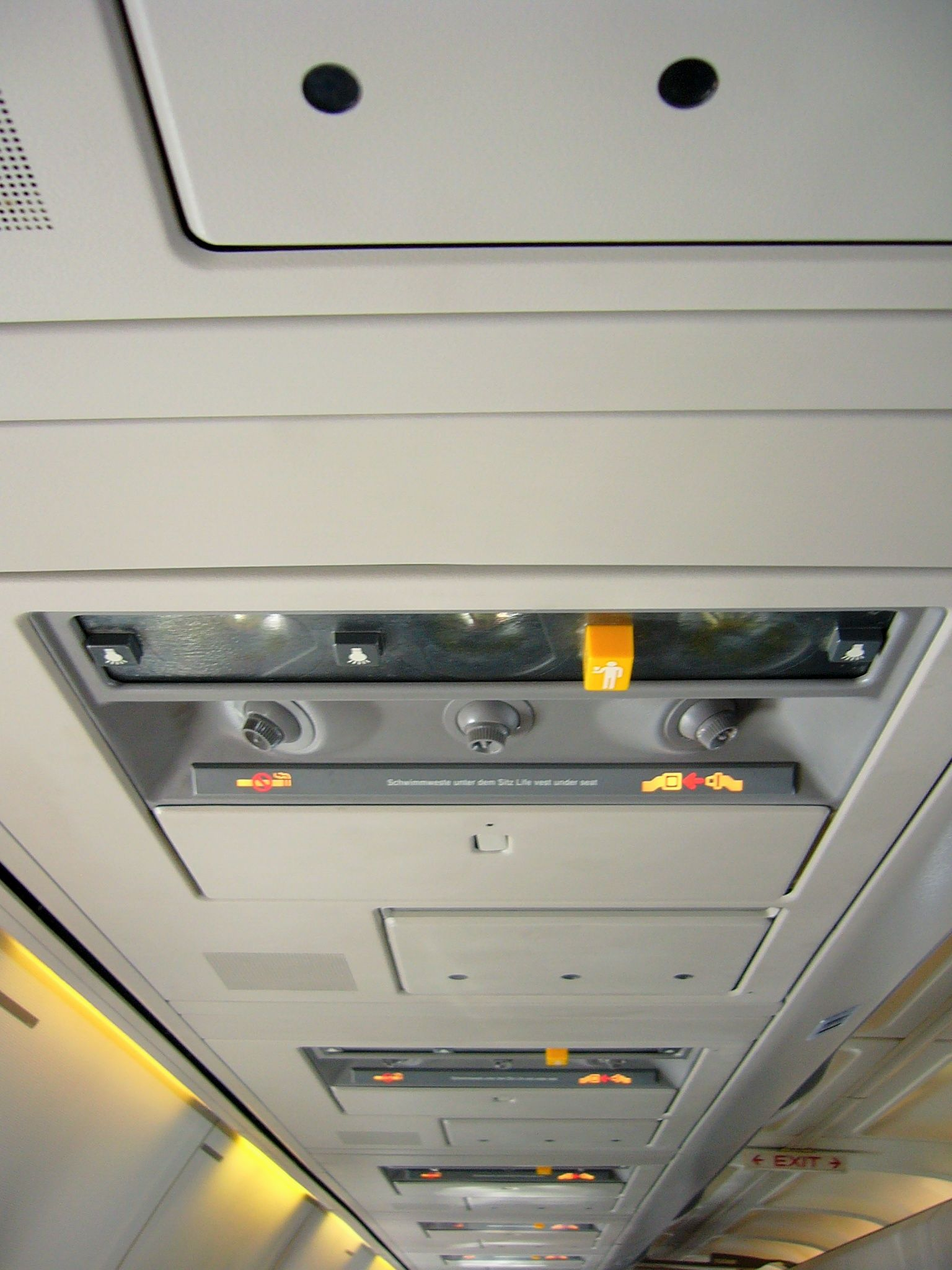
The arrangement of controls, lights and nozzles on a Boeing 737. The "fasten seat belt" sign is immediately in front of the nozzles.

Generally, every individual seat position (except for the last ones at the rear of the cabin) has a small set of auxiliary controls built into the seat back for the passenger directly behind the seat. The seat itself normally contains a small flip-out, extendable tray table (which must be folded away during takeoff and landing), and, on most wide-body international aircraft, an LCD video screen directly above the tray table (earlier aircraft had a single large projection screen at the front of each cabin). Directly above the seat (on the cabin ceiling) is a console for the passenger service unit. The controls on the PSU console may include:

- An air-conditioning nozzle whose airflow and orientation can be adjusted by the passenger. This feature is found on most narrowbody aircraft, but many airlines omit them on many newer widebody aircraft (such as the Boeing 777).
- A reading light (often very similar in appearance to the nozzle) that can be turned on by the passenger for extra light, especially when the main cabin lights are turned off. The buttons to turn the lights on and off are usually located directly on the overhead console on most narrowbody aircraft, while on most widebody aircraft, the buttons are usually found together with the in-flight entertainment (IFE) controls, which may be on the armrests, the seat backs, or a touch-screen interface.
- A call button, that, when pressed, alerts a flight attendant on board to attend to the passengers in the row with the pressed button (a quiet audio signal in the galley and various lights alert flight attendants). As with the reading light buttons, the call button is usually located directly on the overhead console on most narrowbody aircraft, while they are found together with IFE controls on most widebody aircraft.
- The "fasten seat belt" sign which is illuminated during takeoff and landing, and during turbulence. Older aircraft preceding the banning of smoking may still have a "no smoking" sign; newer aircraft may have a "turn off electronic devices" sign instead.

At window seats there are window shades for protection from sunlight. Regulations require them to be open during landings and takeoffs, to provide visibility into and out of the aircraft in emergencies. Some airlines request passengers to keep the window shades down, in addition to muting cabin lighting, during times when most passengers will want to sleep. The Boeing 787 Dreamliner and newer Airbus A350 aircraft uses electrochromic windows instead of window covers. Many armrests provide devices for reclining the chair, control handsets for in-flight entertainment systems. Ashtrays, universally provided when smoking was permitted, are still sometimes provided for small detritus.
