= Litigant in person =

English legal concept

In England and Wales, a litigant in person is an individual, company or organisation that has rights of audience (this is, the right to address the court) and is not represented in a court of England and Wales by a solicitor or barrister. Instructing a barrister and not a solicitor, for example through the Public Access Scheme, however, does not prevent the party on whose behalf the barrister had been instructed from being a litigant in person.

It is possible nevertheless for litigants in England and Wales to obtain free legal advice and in some cases representation from the Citizens Advice Bureau (CAB).

McKenzie Friend Support In England and Wales, a litigant in person may be assisted by a McKenzie Friend, as established in McKenzie v McKenzie [1970]. A McKenzie Friend can provide moral support, take notes, and offer quiet advice but cannot address the court without permission.

The term litigant in person is also used in the similar (but separate) legal systems of Irish law and Northern Irish law.

The equivalent in Scotland is a party litigant and in the United States is pro se legal representation.

The right to defend oneself in person or through chosen legal assistance is provided for in Article 6 of the European Convention on Human Rights.

== Civil defendant ==
The defendants in the McLibel case (McDonald's Corporation v Steel & Morris, [1997] EWHC QB 366) represented themselves in person both at first instance and on appeal during a libel lawsuit which lasted nearly ten years.

== Criminal defendant ==
A special category of litigant in person arises when a defendant in a criminal case dismisses their defence counsel and chooses to defend the case themselves. This is almost invariably an inadvisable course of action, since the law and procedure can be complex and the penalties if convicted can be severe. Furthermore, in some jurisdictions the litigant in person is restricted from cross-examining the alleged victim in rape and other serious sexual offences. The underlying policy is that an alleged victim should not have to answer directly to an alleged rapist. The right of the individual to defend themselves is in conflict with the need to protect the alleged victim from any further humiliation. In the UK this conflict is resolved by the court appointing a special counsel at public expense to conduct cross-examination.

High-profile cases in Scotland where the accused conducted his own defence and lost were Peter Manuel (who was hanged) and Tommy Sheridan.

== Appellant in person ==
An appellant in person is someone who by their own choice, or because their former counsel is criticised and has withdrawn, is conducting their own appeal at a Crown Court or at the Court of Appeal Criminal Division. The number of appellants who choose to do this is exceptionally small, mainly due to the inherent risks involved, appellants who serve a custodial sentence can have part of that sentence ordered to be served again if the court is of the view that the application is without merit. They must also understand highly complex court procedures, prepare detailed legal paperwork and orally argue a full legal appeal case in front of three High Court judges and a full court.

== Representing companies ==
In Battle v Irish Art Promotion Centre Ltd, the Supreme Court of Ireland ruled that a company cannot be represented by a corporate officer in lieu of a barrister or solicitor. The "Battle rule" has been slightly relaxed by later decisions.

== See also ==
- Pro se litigant, an equivalent concept in the United States
- McKenzie friend
- Personal Support Unit
