= Passenger service unit =

Aircraft component

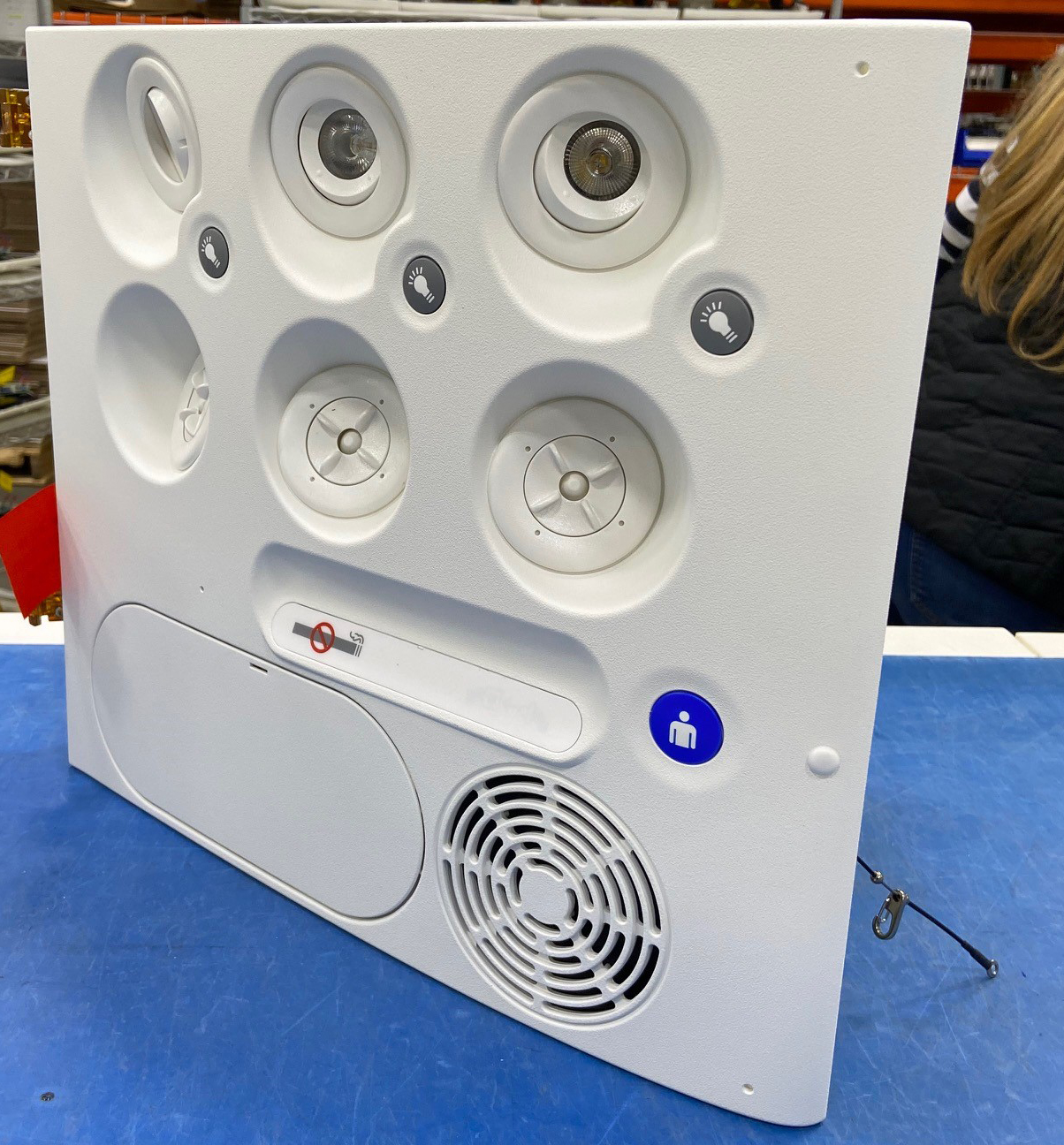
PECO Passenger Service Unit for the Boeing 737

A passenger service unit (PSU) is an aircraft component situated above each row in the overhead panel above the passenger seats in the cabin of airliners. Among other things, a PSU contains reading lights, loudspeakers for announcements, illuminated signs (to remind people that the cabin is a no-smoking zone and to wear a seatbelt), buttons to call for assistance (though these are mounted on the armrest on some aircraft), air condition vents, and automatically deployed oxygen masks in case of cabin depressurisation.

May be absent or simplified on the smallest regional aircraft or on some very early-generation airliners

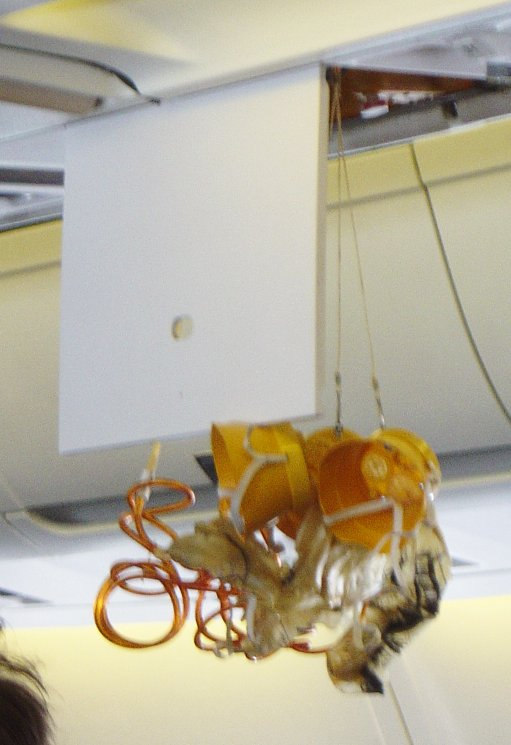
Oxygen masks deployed from a PSU
