= Civil Procedure Rule Committee =

UK advisory non-departmental public body

The Civil Procedure Rule Committee is an advisory non-departmental public body within the Government of the United Kingdom which makes rules for the Civil Division of the Court of Appeal, High Court and County Court.
