= Support Through Court =

UK legal charity

- Formation: 2001; 25 years ago
- Founder: Diana Copisarow
- Type: Charitable organisation
- Registration no.: 1090781
- Purpose: Supporting litigants in person
- Headquarters: Royal Courts of Justice, Strand, London, WC2A 2LL
- Region served: England and Wales 19 locations nationally
- Methods: Face to face, telephone
- Chief Executive Officer: Emma Taylor
- Revenue: £1.52 million (2022)
- Volunteers: 497
- Website: supportthroughcourt.org
- Formerly called: Personal Support Unit

Support Through Court (formerly The Personal Support Unit (The PSU)) is a UK legal charity that supports people who have to represent themselves in court. The aim is to "reduce the disadvantage of people facing the civil and family justice system without a lawyer, enabling them to access justice" and believe that "no one should face court alone".

Support Through Court does not offer legal advice, but provides support to clients in a variety of other ways including: explaining how the court system works, helping to fill in court forms and papers, and accompanying clients to their hearings.

== History ==
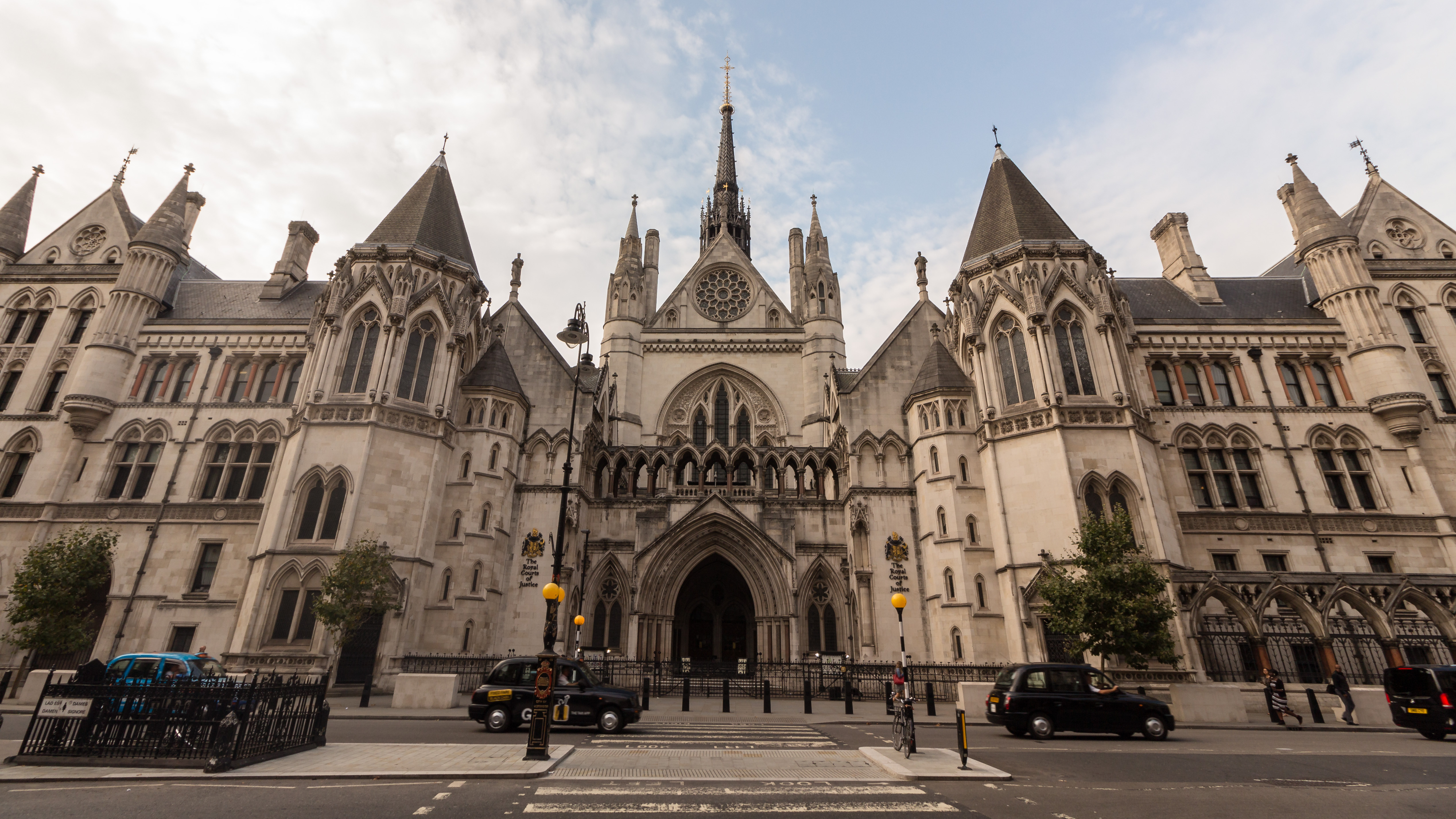
The Personal Support Unit was founded in 2001 at the Royal Courts of Justice

The PSU was founded in 2001, led by Diana Copisarow OBE, Michael Naish and Mark Sheldon CBE. Whilst volunteering at the Old Bailey for the Witness Service, Lady Copisarow supported an unrepresented litigant through contested divorce proceedings at the Royal Courts. The litigant's experience was horrendous as she faced the confusion of the court system, uncertainty about appearing before a judge, and the general emotions of litigation. These experiences drove Lady Copisarow, Michael Naish and Mark Sheldon CBE to establish the PSU to meet the human, non-legal, needs of people attending court alone and without legal representation. The PSU grew rapidly from 2007 onwards.

Following changes to legal aid in 2012, the PSU had a rise in demand for its services and now operates from 23 courts in 17 different cities across England and Wales.

In 2014 the PSU won The Guardian's 'Small Charity, Big Difference' Award.

In February 2017 the PSU reached the milestone of having helped on over 200,000 occasions.

In October 2019 the PSU was rebranded as Support Through Court to convey more effectively the services offered to litigants in persons.

In February 2020 Support Through Court launched its national helpline to offer individuals who cannot commute to an office an alternative method of accessing its services.

In April 2020 Support Through Court won the SME News' 'Best Legal Support Volunteers 2020, England and Wales' award.

== Aims and principles ==
Support Through Court aims to reduce the disadvantage of people facing the civil and family justice system without a lawyer, enabling them to access justice. Support Through Court believes that no one should face court alone and their vision is that every person in England and Wales who wants help should be able to access the help of a Support Through Court volunteer.

Support Through Court volunteers can:

- Explain how the court works, help fill in forms, organise papers, and discuss settling issues without going to court
- Help plan what you want to say in court, and if needed accompany you in court to take notes and help afterwards
- Provide details of other specialist agencies and help you find out whether you can get free legal advice

== Impact ==
Support Through Court volunteers will help with any aspect of civil legal proceedings: over half of Support Through Court help is in a family matter, with two thirds of these cases concerning children; nearly 17% of cases involve a money claim; and 14% concern housing problems, which often place people at risk of homelessness. Many of their clients are vulnerable and disadvantaged, and to Support Through Court volunteers for reassurance and guidance. Most clients cannot afford a lawyer and are not eligible for legal aid.

In 2017-18 the PSU helped clients on a record 65,000 occasions.

After being helped by a Support Through Court volunteer, 98% of clients report that they feel the Support Through Court helped them get a fairer hearing.

== Locations ==
Support Through Court has offices across England and Wales:

- Birmingham Civil Justice Centre
- Cardiff Civil and Family Justice Centre
- Central Family Court, London
- Chelmsford County Court
- Leeds Leeds Beckett University
- Liverpool Civil and Family Court
- Manchester Civil Justice Centre
- School of Law, University of Sheffield
- Southend Court House
- The Royal Courts of Justice, London

== See also ==
- McKenzie Friend
