= Parti Socialiste Unifié =

Parti Socialiste Unifié can refer to:

- Unified Socialist Party (Burkina Faso)
- Unified Socialist Party (France)
- Unified Socialist Party (Morocco)
