= Practice direction =

In English law, a practice direction is a supplemental protocol to rules of civil and criminal procedure in the courts – "a device to regulate minor procedural matters" – and is "an official announcement by the court laying down rules as to how it should function." The Civil Procedure Rules 1998 contains a large number of practice directions which give practical advice on how to interpret the rules themselves. Also, individual courts and judges may make their own practice directions, especially in specialist types of proceedings such as in the patent court.

A famous example of a practice statement occurred in 1966 when the House of Lords declared itself able to depart from its own precedent decisions in order to achieve justice.
