= List of institutions of higher education in Punjab, India =

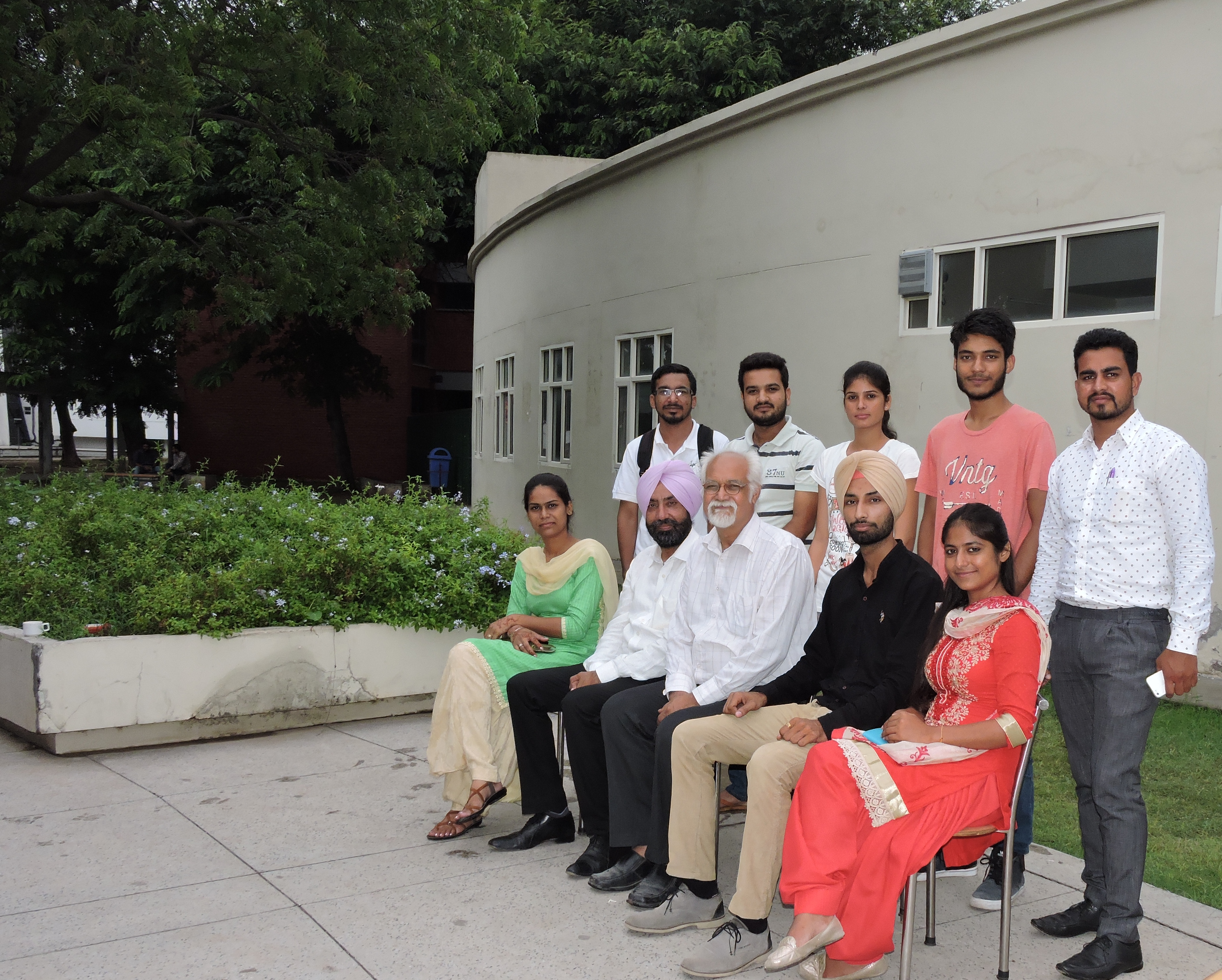
Punjabi university students with professor

This is a list of institutions of higher education in Punjab.

== Autonomous institutions ==
=== Institutes of National Importance ===
- All India Institute of Medical Sciences, Bathinda
- Dr. B. R. Ambedkar National Institute of Technology Jalandhar
- Indian Institute of Management Amritsar
- Indian Institute of Science Education and Research, Mohali
- Indian Institute of Technology, Ropar
- National Institute of Pharmaceutical Education and Research, Mohali

=== State Government Institutions ===
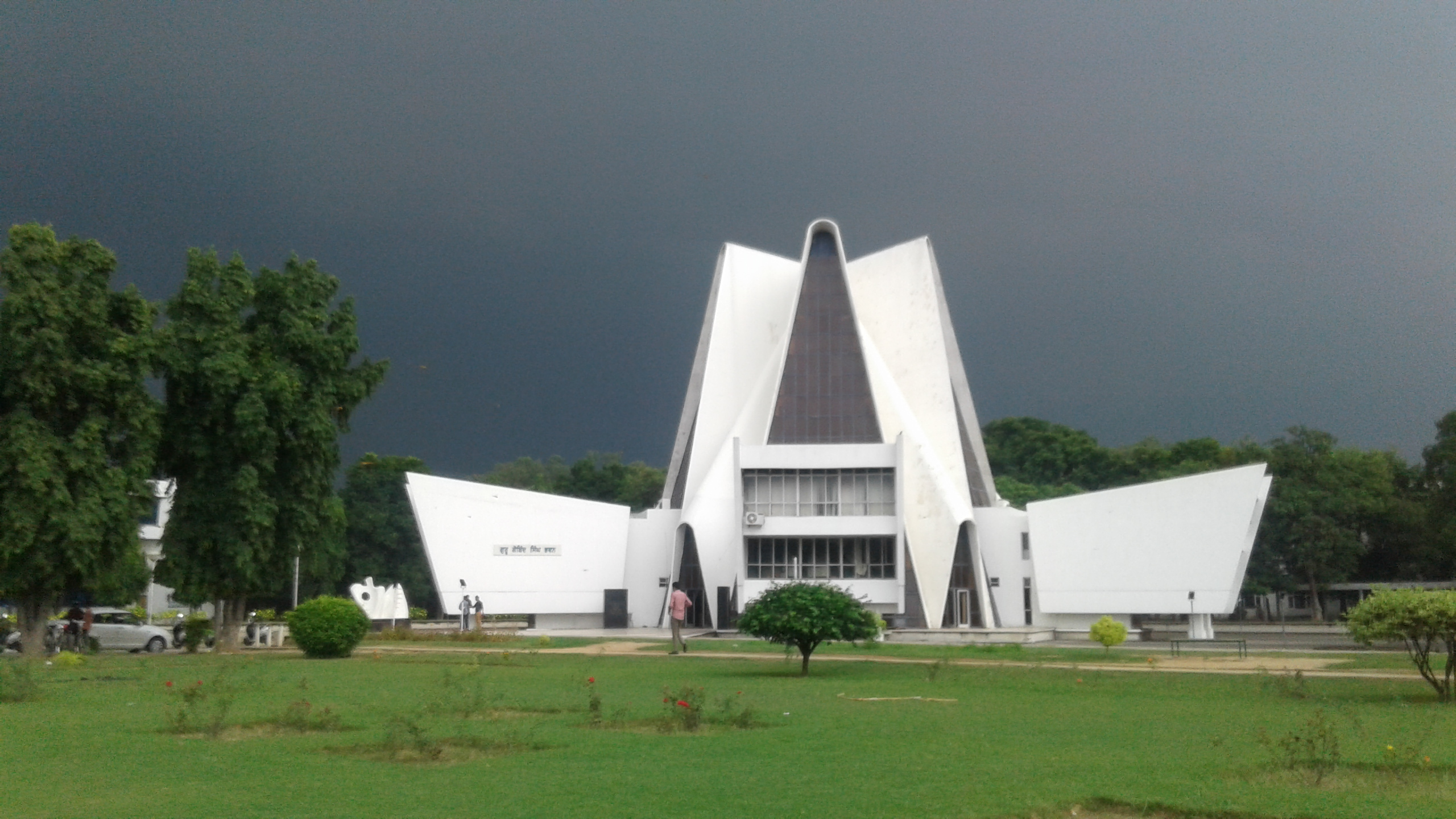
Punjabi University

- Baba Farid University of Health Sciences, Faridkot
- Central University of Punjab
- Guru Nanak Dev University, Amritsar
- Guru Ravidas Ayurved University, Hoshiarpur
- I. K. Gujral Punjab Technical University, Jalandhar
- Jagat Guru Nanak Dev Punjab State Open University, Patiala
- Maharaja Ranjit Singh Punjab Technical University , Bathinda
- Punjab Agricultural University, Ludhiana
- Punjab Sports University, Patiala
- Panjab University
- Punjabi University Guru Kashi Campus, Talwandi Sabo
- Rajiv Gandhi National University of Law, Patiala
- Shaheed Bhagat Singh State University, Firozpur
- Sri Guru Teg Bahadur State University of Law, Tarn Taran district

=== Deemed ===
- Sant Longowal Institute of Engineering and Technology
- Thapar Institute of Engineering and Technology, Patiala

=== Private ===
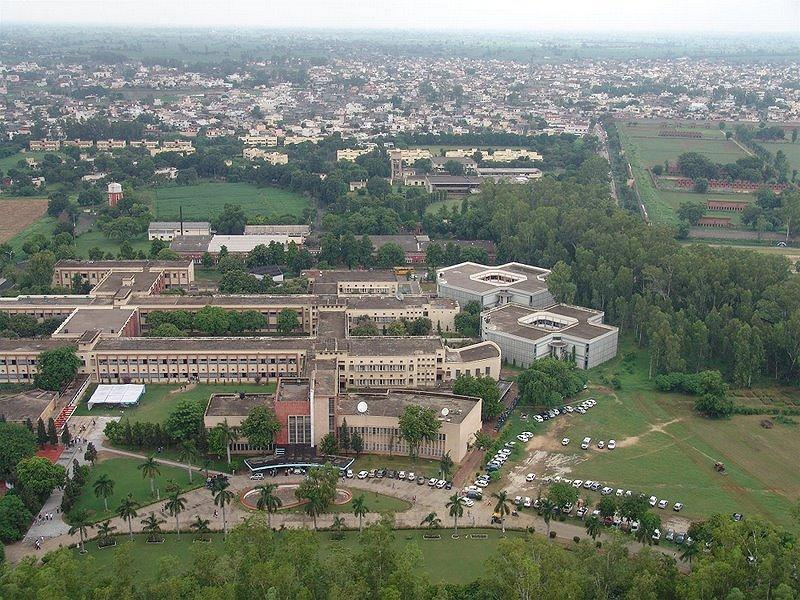
Thapar Institute of Engineering and Technology (aerial view)

- Akal University, Bathinda
- CT University, Ludhiana
- Chandigarh University, Mohali
- Chitkara University, Punjab, Rajpura
- DAV University, Jalandhar
- Desh Bhagat University, Mandi Gobindgarh
- GNA University, Phagwara
- Guru Kashi University, Talwandi Sabo
- Indian School of Business, Mohali Campus
- Lovely Professional University, Phagwara
- Rayat-Bahra University, Mohali
- Sri Guru Granth Sahib World University, Fatehgarh Sahib
- Sri Guru Ram Das University of Health Sciences, Sri Amritsar

== Autonomous colleges in Punjab ==
=== Autonomous Degree Colleges ===
- Kanya Maha Vidyalaya (KMV), Jalandhar
- Khalsa College, Amritsar

=== Engineering Colleges ===
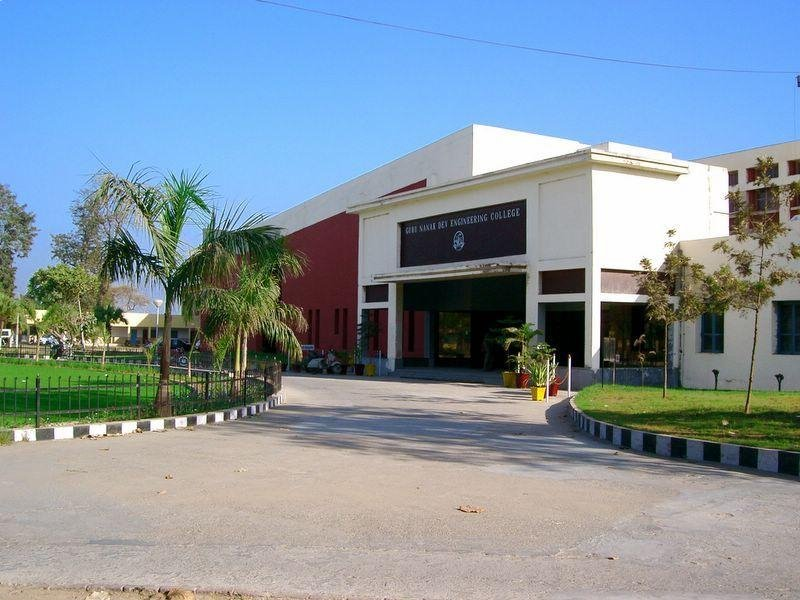
Guru Nanak Dev Engineering College, Ludhiana

- Guru Nanak Dev Engineering College, Ludhiana

=== Medical colleges ===
- Adesh Institute of Medical Sciences & Research, Bathinda
- Christian Medical College, Ludhiana
- Government Medical College, Amritsar
- Government Medical College, Patiala
- Guru Gobind Singh Medical College, Faridkot
- Punjab Institute of Medical Sciences, Jalandhar
- All India Institute of Medical Sciences, Bathinda

== Reputed colleges (Technical / Professional) ==
- Baring Union Christian College, Batala
- Guru Nanak Dev Engineering College, Ludhiana
- Indo Global Colleges, Abhipur
- Khalsa College, Amritsar
- I. K. Gujral Punjab Technical University . Phagwara
- Shaheed Bhagat Singh State University , Ferozepur
- Yadavindra College of Engineering, Punjabi University Guru Kashi Campus, Talwandi Sabo

== Other Reputed Institutions ==
- BBK DAV College for Women, Amritsar
- Mohindra College, Patiala
- Panjab University Swami Sarvanand Giri Regional Centre, Hoshiarpur
- PCTE Group of Institutes (including Punjab College of Technical Education), Ludhiana
- PEC University of Technology, Chandigarh

== District-Wise Universities and Colleges in Punjab ==
=== Amritsar ===
- BBK DAV College for Women, Amritsar
- Guru Nanak Dev University
- Khalsa College, Amritsar
- Khalsa College of Law, Amritsar
- Sri Guru Ram Das University of Health Sciences, Sri Amritsar

=== Bathinda ===
- Central University of Punjab
- All India Institute of Medical Sciences
- Adesh Institute of Medical Sciences & Research
- Bathinda College of Law
- DAV College
- Giani Zail Singh Campus College of Engineering & Technology
- Government Rajindra College
- Guru Kashi University
- Yadavindra College of Engineering, Punjabi University Guru Kashi Campus, Talwandi Sabo

=== Faridkot ===
- Baba Farid Law College
- Baba Farid University of Health Sciences

=== Fatehgarh Sahib ===
- Desh Bhagat University
- Mata Gujri Mahila Mahavidyalaya
- Sri Guru Granth Sahib World University

=== Fazilka ===
- DAV College, Abohar

=== Hoshiarpur ===
- Guru Ravidas Ayurved University
- Panjab University Swami Sarvanand Giri Regional Centre, Hoshiarpur

=== Jalandhar ===
- DAV University
- Doaba College
- Dr. B. R. Ambedkar National Institute of Technology Jalandhar
- Hans Raj Mahila Maha Vidyalaya
- Lovely Professional University
- Punjab Institute of Medical Sciences

=== Kapurthala ===
- I. K. Gujral Punjab Technical University

=== Ludhiana ===
- CT University, Ludhiana
- Christian Medical College, Ludhiana
- Dayanand Medical College & Hospital
- Guru Nanak Dev Engineering College, Ludhiana
- Punjab Agricultural University

=== Moga ===
- Baba Kundan Singh Memorial Law College

=== Patiala ===
- Chitkara University, Rajpura
- Government Medical College, Patiala
- Government Mohindra College
- Multani Mal Modi College
- Netaji Subhas National Institute of Sports
- Punjab Sports University
- Punjabi University
- Rajiv Gandhi National University of Law
- Thapar Institute of Engineering and Technology

=== Sahibazada Ajit Singh Nagar ===
- Chandigarh University
- IISER Mohali
- Institute of Nano Science and Technology
- National Institute of Pharmaceutical Education and Research SAS Nagar (NIPER Mohali)

=== Sangrur ===
- Bhai Gurdas College of Law
- Sant Longowal Institute of Engineering and Technology
