= List of law schools in Punjab =

List of law schools in Punjab, India

In Punjab the courses of law are offered by various private and government colleges and universities, and around 52 legal education centres. One can study in various law courses such as LL.B, integrated LL.B, LL.M and doctoral courses. LLB is an undergraduate degree that covers core specializations and mainly focuses on criminal law, contract law, constitutional/administrative law, equity and trusts, land law, and tort law. The list of CLEs are as follows:

Sr. no.	District	Affiliating university	Established	Name of legal education centre	Programs	Status/academic head
1	Ludhiana	Panjab University, Chandigarh	2006	G.H.G. Institute of Law, Sidhwan Khurd	B.A.LL.B (Hons.) 5 years integrated course and LL.B 3 years course	Self financed institute under Shri Guru Hargobind Ujagar Hari Trust, Sidhwan Khurd
2	Bathinda	Central University of Punjab	2024	School of Legal Studies	BALL.B. (H.) 5 year, LL.M. 2 year, Ph.D. law	Central university
3	Ludhiana	CT University, Ludhiana	2018	School of Law, CT University, Ludhiana	3 year LLB course, 5 year BA.LLB, 5 year BALL.B. (H.), 5 year B.Com.LL.B., 5 year B.Com.LL.B. (H.)	Private university
4	Fatehgarh Sahib	Desh Bhagat University Mandi Gobindgarh, Amloh, Fatehgarh Sahib	2013	University School of Law, Desh Bhagat University, Mandi Gobindgarh, Amloh, Fatehgarh Sahib	3 year LLB course (60), 5 year BA.LLB (60)	Private university
5	Amritsar	Guru Nanak Dev University, Amritsar	1972	Gurunanak Dev University, Amritsar	Dept. of Law, Univ.	
6	Jalandhar	Guru Nanak Dev University, Amritsar	1979	Dept. of Law, Regional Centre, Gurunanak Dev University, Regional Centre	3 year LLB course	Regional centre
7	Chandigarh	Aryans Group of Colleges, Chandigarh	2007	Dept. of Law, Regional, Aryans Group of Colleges, Regional Centre	3 year LLB course	Private college
8	Gurdaspur	Guru Nanak Dev University, Amritsar	1999	Regional Centre, Gurunanak Dev University, Gurdaspur	5 year LLB course	Regional centre
9	Jalandhar	Guru Nanak Dev University, Amritsar	2002	School of Legal Studies, Gurunanak Dev University, Jalandhar	5 year LLB course	UTD
10	Batala	Guru Nanak Dev University, Amritsar	2004	V.M.S. Law College, Batala	5 year LLB course (2004), 3 year LLB course (2006)	Affiliated private college
11	Jalandhar	Guru Nanak Dev University, Amritsar	2004	St. Soldier Law College, Jalander	5 year LLB course, 3 year LLB course, 5 year B.Com.LLB	Affiliated private college
12	Jalandhar	Guru Nanak Dev University, Amritsar	2005	KCL Institute of Law	3 year LLB course, 5 year BA.LLB	
13	Amritsar	Guru Nanak Dev University, Amritsar	2012	Khalsa College of Law	3 year LLB course, 5 year BA.LLB, 5 year B.Com.LL.B.	
14	Taran Taran	Guru Nanak Dev University, Amritsar	2016	Punjab College of Law, Usma, Taran Taran	3 year LLB course, 5 year B.Com.LL.B.	
15	Jalandhar	Guru Nanak Dev University, Amritsar	2017	C.T. Institute of Law	3 year LLB course, 5 year BA.LLB, 5 year B.Com.LL.B.	
16	Amritsar	Guru Nanak Dev University, Amritsar	2020	Amritsar Law College	3 year LLB course, 5 year BA.LLB	
17	Bathinda	Guru Kashi University, Talwandi Sabo, Bathinda	2016	University School of Law	3 year LLB course, 5 year BALL.B. (H.)	
18	Phagwara	Lovely Professional University	2003	Lovely Institute of Law	3 year LLB course, 5 year BA.LLB	
19	Phagwara	Lovely Professional University	2014	School of Law	3 year LLB course, 5 year BBA.LLB (H.), 5 year BALL.B. (H.), 5 year B.Com.LL.B. (H.)	
20	Chandigarh	Punjab University Chandigarh	1947	Dept of Law, UTD	3 year LLB course	
21	Muktsar	Punjab University Chandigarh	2001	Regional Centre, Muktsar	3 year LLB course	
22	Nawanshahar	Punjab University Chandigarh	2004	Rayat College of Law, Railmajra	3 year LLB course, 5 year BALL.B. (H.), 5 year B.Com.LL.B. (H.)	
23	Ludhiana	Punjab University Chandigarh	2003	University Institute of Law, Punjab University Regional Centre	3 year LLB course, 5 year BALL.B. (H.)	
24	Chandigarh	Punjab University Chandigarh	2004	University Institute of Legal Studies, Punjab University	5 year BALL.B. (H.), 5 year B.Com.LL.B. (H.)	
25	Ludhiana	Punjab University Chandigarh	2006	Guru Nanak College of Law	5 year BALL.B.	
26	Moga	Punjab University Chandigarh	2007	Baba Kundan Singh Memorial Law College, Moga	3 year LLB course, 5 year BALL.B., 5 year B.Com.LL.B. (H.)	
27	Hoshiarpur	Punjab University Chandigarh	2007	Swami Sarvanand Giri Punjab University Regional Centre, Sadhu Ashram, Bajwara	3 year LLB course, 5 year BALL.B.	
28	Hoshiarpur	Punjab University Chandigarh	2016	Rayat-Bahra College of Law	5 year BALL.B.	
29	Mohali	Punjab University Chandigarh	2016	Universal College of Law	3 year LLB course, 5 year BALL.B.	
30	Patiala	Punjab University Chandigarh	2016	Aryans College of law	3 year LLB course, 5 year BALL.B., 5 year B.Com.LL.B.	
31	Fatehgarh Sahib	Punjab University Chandigarh	2017	Punjab College of Law, Fatehgarh Sahib	3 year LLB course, 5 year BALL.B.	
32	Patiala	Punjabi University, Patiala	1965	Department of Law, UTD, Punjabi University	3 year LLB course	
33	Patiala	Punjabi University, Patiala	1999	Army Institute of Law	5 year BALL.B.	
34	Sangrur	Punjabi University, Patiala	2003	Bhai Gurdas College of Law	3 year LLB course, 5 year BALL.B.	
35	Patiala	Punjabi University, Patiala	2004	Lincoln College of law	3 year LLB course, 5 year BALL.B.	
36	Patiala	Punjabi University, Patiala	2004	Punjab College of Law	3 year LLB course, 5 year BALL.B.	
37	Faridkot	Punjabi University, Patiala	2004	Baba Farid Law College	3 year LLB course, 5 year BALL.B.	
38	Dhanthal	Punjabi University, Patiala	2004	Sardar Amarjit Singh Memorial Institute of Law	3 year LLB course, 5 year BALL.B.	
39	Mohali	Punjabi University, Patiala	2005	Rayat and Bahara's MMTI College of Law, Sahauran (After 2015 under Rayat Bahara University)	3 year LLB course, 5 year BALL.B.	
40	Patiala	Punjabi University, Patiala	2007	Punjab School of Law, Punjabi University	5 year BALL.B.	
41	Bhatinda	Punjabi University, Patiala	2008	Bathinda College of Law	3 year LLB course	
42	Patiala	Punjabi University, Patiala	2014	Department of Law, Government Mahendra College	5 year BALL.B.	
43	Patiala	Punjabi University, Patiala	2015	Bahara College of Law, Bhedpura	5 year BALL.B.	
44	Fatehgarh Sahib	Punjabi University, Patiala	2017	Punjab College of Law, Sarkapra	3 year LLB course, 5 year BALL.B.	
45	Samana	Punjabi University, Patiala	2020	Nancy College of Law	3 year LLB course, 5 year BALL.B.	
46	Mohali	Rayat-Bahra University, Mohali	2015	University School of Law	3 year LLB course, 5 year BALL.B., 5 year B.Com.LL.B.	
47	Patiala	Rajiv Gandhi National University of Law	2006	UTD	5 year BALL.B.	
48	Jalandhar	Sant Baba Bhag Singh University, Khiala	2017	University Institute of Law	3 year LLB course, 5 year BALL.B.	
49	Fatehgarh Sahib	Sri Guru Granth Sahib World University	2016	University School of Law	3 year LLB course, 5 year BALL.B.	
50	Mandi Gobindgarh	RIMT University	2016	RIMT School of Legal Studies	3 year LLB course, 5 year BALL.B., 5 year BBALL.B., 5 year B.Com.LL.B.	
51	Jalandhar	DAV University	2020	University School of Legal Studies	5 year BALL.B.	
52	Sarangpur, Chandigarh	NMIMS University	2020	SVKM's NMIMS School of Law	5 year BALL.B. (H.), 5 year BBALL.B. (H.)	
53	Bathinda	Guru Kashi University	1999	Regional centre	3 year LLB course	
54	Jalandhar	St. Soldier Law College, Jalandhar	April, 2015, Guru Nanak dev University Amritsar	3 year LLB course, 5 year BA.LLB, 5 year BALL.B. (H.), 5 year B.Com.LL.B., 5 year B.Com.LL.B. (H.)	Private college	

== See also ==
- List of law schools in India
- Autonomous law schools in India
- Common Law Admission Test
- Legal education in India
