= List of law schools in India =

This is a list of law schools in India.

== Andhra Pradesh ==
- Acharya Nagarjuna University, Guntur
- Andhra Christian College, Guntur
- Dr. B. R. Ambedkar College of Law, Visakhapatnam
- Anantha College of Law, Tirupati
- Anantapur Law College, Anantapur
- A.V.R. Amrutha College of Law, Visakhapatnam
- Bapatla Education Society's Law College, Bapatla
- C.R.R. Law College, Eluru
- Dr Ambedkar Global Law Institute, Tirupati, formerly Dr. B. R. Ambedkar Law College
- Dr. B.R. Ambedkar P.G. Centre, Etcherla, Srikakulam
- Daita Sriramulu Hindu College of Law, Machilipatnam
- Damodaram Sanjivayya National Law University, Visakhapatnam
- D.N. Raju Law College, Bhimavaram
- D.S.R. Hindu Law College, Machilipatnam
- Gitam School of Law, of GITAM University, Visakhapatnam
- G.S.K.M. Law College, Rajahmundry
- Indira Priyadarshini Law College, Ongole
- JC College of Law, Guntur
- KKC College of Law, Chittoor
- K.L.U. College of Law, Green Fields of Vaddeshwaram University of Guntur
- MAM LAW College, Kesanupalli (village), Narasaraopet (mandal), Palnadu
- M.M. College of Law, Vijayawada
- M.P.R. Law College, Srikakulam
- M.R.V.R.G.R Law College, Viziayanagaram
- N.B.M. Law College, Visakhapatnam
- Ns Law College, Devaraju Gattu village, near Markapur
- NVP Law College, Visakhapatnam
- Osmania Law College, Kurnool
- PS Raju Law College, Kakinada
- Rajiv Gandhi Institute of Law, Kakinada
- Sri R.K.M. Law College, Chittoor
- Shri Shiridi Sai Vidya Parishad Law College, Amalapuram
- Shri Shiridi Sai Vidya Parishad Law College, Anakapalli
- Smt. Basava Rama Tarakam Memorial Law College, Cuddapah
- Smt Velagapudi Durgamba Siddhartha Law College, Vijayawada
- Sree Vijaya Nagar Law College, Anantapur
- Sri Eshwar Reddy College of Law, Tirupati
- Sri P. Basi Reddy College of Law, Cuddapah
- Sri Prasunna College of Law, Kurnool
- Sri Sankara's Law College, Kurnool
- Sri Venkateswara College of Law, Tirupati
- Sri Venkateshwara University, Tirupati
- Sri Krishnadevaraya University of Anantapur
- Sri Padmavati Mahila Viswavidyalayam of Tirupati
- Sri Venkateswara University of Tirupati
- University Law College, Waltair (Dr. B.R. Ambedkar College of Law)
- University College of Law, A. Nagarjuna
- V.R. Law College, Nellore
- Veeravalli College of Law, Rajahmundhry
- Vikramasimhapuri University of Nellore
- Visakha Law College, Visakhapatnam
- Yogi Vemana University, Kadapa

== Arunachal Pradesh ==
- Jarbom Gamlin Government Law College

== Assam ==
- National Law University and Judicial Academy, Assam
- JB Law College, Guwahati
- University Law College, Gauhati University
- NEF Law College, Guwahati
- Dispur Law College, Guwahati
- Jorhat Law College, Jorhat
- Tezpur Law College, Tezpur
- BRM Government Law College, Guwahati
- Dhubri Law College, Dhubri
- Nowgong Law College, Nowgong
- Diphu Law College, Diphu
- Assam University, Silchar
- A. K. Chanda Law College, Silchar
- Dr. R. K. B. Law College, Dibrugarh
- IIPA Law Institute, Dibrugarh
- D.H.S.K. Law College, Dibrugarh
- S.I.P.E. Law College, Dibrugarh
- Morigaon Law College, Morigaon
- Royal School of Law and Administration, Guwahati
- Bongaigaon Law College, Bongaigaon

Goalpara law college , Goalpara

== Bihar ==
- Chanakya National Law University, Patna
- Central University of South Bihar, Gaya
- Anugrah Memorial Law college, Gaya
- Biswanath Singh Institute of Legal Studies, Munger
- Bihar Institute of Law, Patna
- Biraja Mohan Thakur Law College, Purnia
- R. M. M. Law College, Saharsa
- Mahadeo Singh Law College, Bhagalpur
- Suryadeo Law College, Katihar
- S.K.J. Law College, Muzaffarpur
- Patna Law College, Patna
- Bidheh Law College, Madhubani
- Samastipur Law College, Samastipur
- T.N.B Law College, Bhagalpur
- C.M.Law college, Darbhanga

== Chhattisgarh ==
- MATS Law School, MATS University, Raipur
- Department of Law, Guru Ghasidas Vishwavidyalaya, Bilaspur
- Faculty of Law, Dr. C. V. Raman University
- Faculty of Law, Kalinga University, Raipur
- Hidyatullah National Law University, Raipur
- Jyoti Bhushan Pratap Singh Law College, Korba
- School of Law, ISBM University
- School of Law, ITM University, Raipur
- School of Studies in Law, Pandit Ravishankar Shukla University, Raipur

== Delhi ==
- University School of Law and Legal Studies, constituent law college of Guru Gobind Singh Indraprastha University, Delhi, established in 2001
- National Law University, Delhi, established in 2008
- Amity Law School, New Delhi (affiliated to Guru Gobind Singh Indraprastha University)
- Faculty of Law, University of Delhi, New Delhi, with three centres: Campus Law Centre, Law Centre I and Law Centre II
- Indian Law Institute, New Delhi
- Maharaja Agrasen Institute of Management Studies, New Delhi (affiliated to Guru Gobind Singh Indraprastha University)
- Vivekananda Institute of Professional Studies, New Delhi (affiliated to Guru Gobind Singh Indraprastha University)
- Faculty of Law, Jamia Millia Islamia, New Delhi
- Gitarattan International Business School, New Delhi (affiliated to Guru Gobind Singh Indraprastha University)
- Trinity Institute of Professional Studies (TIPS), New Delhi (affiliated to Guru Gobind Singh Indraprastha University)

== Goa ==
- Govind Ramnath Kare College of Law, Margao (affiliated to Goa University)
- V. M. Salgaocar College of Law, Panji

== Gujarat ==
- Auro University, Surat
- Gujarat Law Society, Ahmedabad
- Baroda School of Legal Studies, Faculty of Law, Maharaja Sayajirao University of Baroda, Vadodara
- Gujarat National Law University, Gandhinagar
- School of Law Forensic Justice & Policy Studies, National Forensic Sciences University, Gandhinagar
- Nirma University, Ahmedabad
- Unitedworld School of Law, Gandhinagar
- Department of Law, Veer Narmad South Gujarat University, Surat

== Haryana ==
- KR Mangalam University
- Jagan Nath University, NCR Bahadurgarh
- Geeta Institute of Law, Panipat
- Jindal Global Law School, Jindal Global University, Sonipat
- BML Munjal University, Kapriwas, Haryana
- Baba Mast Nath University, in Asthal Bohar, Rohtak
- Kurushetra University
- Maharishi Dayanand University Rohtak
- Dr. B.R. Ambedkar National Law University
- MDU Center for Professional and Allied Studies, GurugramI
- GD Goenka University

== Himachal Pradesh ==
- Faculty of Law, Himachal Pradesh University, Shimla
- Himachal Pradesh National Law University, Shimla

== Jammu and Kashmir ==
- School of Legal Studies, Central University of Kashmir
- Vitasta School of Law and Humanities, Srinagar, Kashmir
- Deptt. of Law, Kashmir University, Srinagar
- Sopore Law College, Sopore
- Kashmir Law College, Srinagar
- K. C. Education Foundation’s Law College, Pulwama-Kashmir
- Department of Law, University of Jammu
- Dogra Law College, Jammu
- Kishen Chand Law College, Jammu
- C. M. H. College of Legal Studies, Jammu
- Jammu Law College, Jammu
- Ashoka Law College, Kathuva
- S. E. T. Law School, Bari Brahmana, Jammu
- Bhargava Law College, Samba
- Law School, Jammu University, Jammu
- R. K. Law College, Bari Brahmana, Jammu

== Jharkhand ==
- National University of Study and Research in Law, Ranchi
- Chotanagpur Law College, Ranchi University, Ranchi
- Jharkhand Vidhi Mahavidyalaya, Kodarma
- Radha Govind Law College, Ramgarh
- Imamul Hai Khan Law College, Bokaro Steel City
- Law College Dhanbad, Dhanbad
- Bhishma Narain Singh Law College, Palamu

== Karnataka ==
- Bengaluru School of Law and Justice, Bangalore
- CMR Law School, Bangalore
- KLE Law College - offers LLB, BA.LLB and BBA. LLB (accredited to Karnataka State Law University, Hubali and recognised by Bar Council of India)
- M. S. Ramaiah College of Law, Bangalore (affiliated to Karnataka State Law University)
- National Law School of India University, Bangalore
- Al-Ameen College of Law, Hosur Road, Bangalore
- CBR National College of Law, Shivamogga (affiliated to Karnataka State Law University)
- Kristu Jayanti College of Law, Bengaluru (affiliated to Karnataka State Law University)
- School of Law, Presidency University, Bangalore
- Raja Lakhamgouda Law College, Belgaum
- School of Law, Christ University, Bangalore
- Sri Dharmasthala Manjunatheswara Law College and Centre for Post Graduate Studies in Law, Mangalore (affiliated to Karnataka State Law University)
- G.K Law College, Hubli (affiliated to Karnataka State Law University)
- University Law College, Bangalore University, Bangalore

== Kerala ==
- Government Law College Calicut, under Calicut University
- Government Law College, Ernakulam, Kochi, under Mahatma Gandhi University, Kottayam
- Government Law College, Thiruvananthapuram, under Kerala University, Thiruvananthapuram
- Government Law College, Thrissur, under Calicut University, Calicut
- Divine Law College, Pathanapuram(affiliated to Kerala University)
- Mar Gregorios College of Law, Thiruvananthapuram (affiliated to Kerala University)
- Kerala Law Academy Law College, Thiruvananthapuram (affiliated to Kerala University)
- Markaz Law College, under Calicut University, Thenjippalam
- MMNSS College Kottiyam, Kollam (affiliated to Kerala University)
- National University of Advanced Legal Studies, Kochi
- School of Legal Studies, CUSAT, Kochi
- Sree Narayana Guru College of Legal Studies, Kollam (affiliated to Kerala University)
- Bharata Mata School of Legal Studies (BSOLS), Aluva

== Madhya Pradesh ==
- Shri Vaishnav Institute of Law, Indore
- Jagran Lakecity University, School of Law, Bhopal
- National Law Institute University, Bhopal
- Dharmashastra National Law University, Jabalpur
- School of Law and Legal Studies, SAGE University Bhopal

== Maharashtra ==
- A.K.K. New Law Academy, Pune, affiliated to Savitribai Phule Pune University, Pune
- Army Law College, Pune, affiliated to University of Pune
- Government Law College, Mumbai, affiliated to University of Mumbai
- RTMNU's Dr. Ambedkar College of Law, Main Branch, Nagpur
- Maharashtra National Law University, Mumbai
- Maharashtra National Law University, Nagpur
- Maharashtra National Law University, Aurangabad
- School of Law, University of Mumbai
- Shahaji Law College, Kolhapur, est. in 1933, affiliated to Shivaji University, Kolhapur
- Siddharth College of Law, Mumbai, affiliated to University of Mumbai
- ILS Law College, Pune, affiliated to University of Pune
- New Law College, Pune, constituent of Bharati Vidyapeeth
- Symbiosis Law School, Pune, constituent of Symbiosis International University
- GJ Advani Law College, affiliated to University of Mumbai
- Rizvi Law College, affiliated to University of Mumbai
- New Law College, Mumbai, affiliated to University of Mumbai

== Manipur ==
- L.M.S. Law College, Imphal

== Mizoram ==
- Mizoram Law College, Aizawl

== Meghalaya ==
- Shillong Law College, Shillong
- Tura Law College, Tura

== Odisha ==
- KIIT Law School, KIIT University, Bhubaneswar
- National Law University Odisha, Cuttack
- Madhusudan Law College, Cuttack
- Bhadrak Law College, Bhadrak
- Siksha 'O' Anusandhan Deemed University National School of Law, Bhubaneswar
- Utkal University Law College, Bhubaneswar
- Berhampur University PG Department of Law, Berhampur
- Sambalpur University PG Department of Law, Sambalpur
- North Odisha University PG Department of Law, Baripada
- The Law College, Cuttack
- Jeypore Law College, Jeypore
- Xavier Law School, Xavier University, Bhubaneswar
- G.M aw College, Puri

== Punjab ==
- G.H.G. Institute of Law, Sidhwan Khurd, Ludhiana
- St. Soldier Law college, Jalandhar
- Army Institute of Law, Mohali
- Rajiv Gandhi National University of Law, Patiala
- Baba Kundan Singh Memorial Law College, Moga, Punjab
- Bhai Gurdas College of Law, Sangrur
- KCL Institute of Law, Jalandhar
- Baba Farid Law College, Faridkot
- VMS College of Law, Batala
- Rayat College of Law, Railmajra
- Khalsa College of Law, Amritsar
- Bathinda College of Law, Bathinda
- Aryans College of Law, Patiala
- Bahra College of Law, Patiala

== Rajasthan ==
- University Five Year Law College, University of Rajasthan, Jaipur
- Seedling School of Law and Governance, Jaipur National University, Jaipur
- National Law University, Jodhpur
- Dr. Bhimrao Ambedkar Law University
- Mody University of Science & Technology
- Raffles University, Neemrana
- Mohan Lal Sukhadiya University College of Law, Udaipur
- RNB Global University

== Sikkim ==
- Sikkim University, Gangtok (est. 2006)
- Sikkim Government Law College
- Faculty of Law, ICFAI University, Sikkim

== Tamil Nadu ==
- Crescent School of Law B.S. Abdur Rahman Crescent Institute of Science & Technology, Chennai (established 1984)
- Institute of Legal Education (ILE - online law school) Tiruchirappalli (established 2022)
- Dr. Ambedkar Government Law College, Chennai (established 1891)
- Government Law College, Coimbatore (established 1979)
- Government Law College, Madurai (established 1979)
- Government Law College, Tiruchirapalli (established 1979)
- Central Law College, Salem, Salem (established 1984)
- Government Law College, Chengalpattu (established 2002)
- Government Law College, Tirunelveli (established 1996)
- Government Law College, Vellore (established 2008)
- Tamil Nadu National Law University, Tiruchirappalli (established 2012)
- v, Vinayaka Mission's Research Foundation, University, Chennai
- SASTRA University, School of Law, Thanjavur
- VIT University, VIT Law School, Chennai
- PRIST University, School of Law, Madurai (established 2015)
- School of Law, Sathyabama Institute of Science and Technology, Chennai

== Telangana ==
- Nalsar University of Law, Hyderabad (established 1998)
- Symbiosis Law School, Hyderabad
- University College of Law, Osmania University, Hyderabad
- Mahatma Gandhi Law College, near LB Nagar, Hyderabad
- Keshav Memorial College of Law, Hyderabad
- Pendekanti Law College, Hyderabad
- Padala Rama Reddi Law College, Hyderabad
- ICFAI Law School, Hyderabad
- Justice Kumarayya Law College, Karimnagar

== Tripura ==
- Tripura Government Law College

== Uttar Pradesh ==
- Kamkus College of Law, Ghaziabad (9410861242, 8737906444)
- AMROHA College of Law, Amroha, Uttar Pradesh
- Asian Law College, Noida
- Asian Vidhi Evam Nyayik Vigyan Mahavidyalay, Nawabganj, Bareilly
- School of Law, Justice & Governance, Gautam Buddha University, Greater Noida
- Department of Law, School of Legal Studies, Babasaheb Bhimrao Ambedkar University, Lucknow
- Faculty of Law, University of Lucknow, Lucknow
- Faculty of Law, Dr. Ram Manohar Lohia Awadh University, Ayodhya
- Faculty of Law, Banaras Hindu University, Varanasi
- Faculty of Law, University of Allahabad
- DME Law School (affiliated to Guru Gobind Singh Indraprastha University)
- Faculty of Law, Integral University, Lucknow
- Symbiosis Law School, Noida (constituent college of Symbiosis International University)
- Galgotias University, School of Law, Greater Noida
- Kanpur University
- Amity Law School, Noida (constituent college of Amity University)
- Dr. Ram Manohar Lohia National Law University, Lucknow
- Faculty of Law, Aligarh Muslim University
- The Glocal University (Glocal School of Law), Saharanpur, Uttar Pradesh
- Lloyd Law College, Greater Noida
- Faculty of Law, Agra College
- Chaudhary Charan Singh Vidhi Mahavidyalaya, Heonra (Saifai), Etawah district
- SRMS college of law, Bareilly
- PGS National College of Law, Dr. Bhimrao Ambedkar University
- Innovative Institute of Law, Greater Noida
- Lloyd Law College, Greater Noida
- Dr. Rajendra Prasad National Law University, Prayagraj
- Mangalayatan University Aligarh

== Uttarakhand ==
- Graphic Era
- ICFAI Law School (ILS), Dehradun
- University of Petroleum and Energy Studies
- Law College, Dehradun
- Department of Law, Hemwati Nandan Bahuguna Garhwal University
- Department of Law, Kumaun University
- Siddhartha Law College, Dehradun
- Quantum University
- Unity Law College (ULC), Kumaon

== West Bengal ==
- Balurghat Law College (affiliated to University of Gour Banga)
- Department of Law, University of Calcutta, Kolkata
- Bankura Samhati Law College (affiliated to Bankura University)
- Department of Law, Aliah University, Kolkata
- Haldia Law College, Haldia (affiliated to Vidyasagar University)
- South Calcutta Law College, Kolkata (affiliated to University of Calcutta)
- School of Law, Brainware University, Kolkata (UGC-recognised, private state university in West Bengal)
- Hooghly Mohsin College, Hooghly (affiliated to University of Burdwan)
- Jogesh Chandra Chaudhuri Law College, Kolkata (affiliated to University of Calcutta)
- Midnapore Law College, Midnapore (affiliated to Vidyasagar University)
- Rajiv Gandhi School of Intellectual Property Law, Indian Institute of Technology, Kharagpur
- Surendranath Law College, Kolkata (affiliated to University of Calcutta)
- Indian Institute of Legal Studies, Siliguri (affiliated to University of North Bengal)
- Kingston Law College, Barasat (affiliated to West Bengal State University)
- Rabindra Shiksha Sammilani Law College, Baruipur (affiliated to University of Calcutta)
- LJD Law College Falta (affiliated to University of Calcutta)
- Snehangshu Kanta Acharya Institute of Law (affiliated to University of Kalyani)
- Mohammad Abdul Bari Institute of Juridical Science (affiliated to University of Kalyani)
- Law College Durgapur (affiliated to Kazi Nazrul University)
- Durgapur Institute of Legal Studies (affiliated to Kazi Nazrul University)
- Jalpaiguri Law College (affiliated to University of North Bengal)
- West Bengal National University of Juridical Sciences, Kolkata

== See also ==
- Common Law Admission Test
- Legal education in India
- National Law Universities
