= Prem Parkash =

Indian writer (1932–2025)

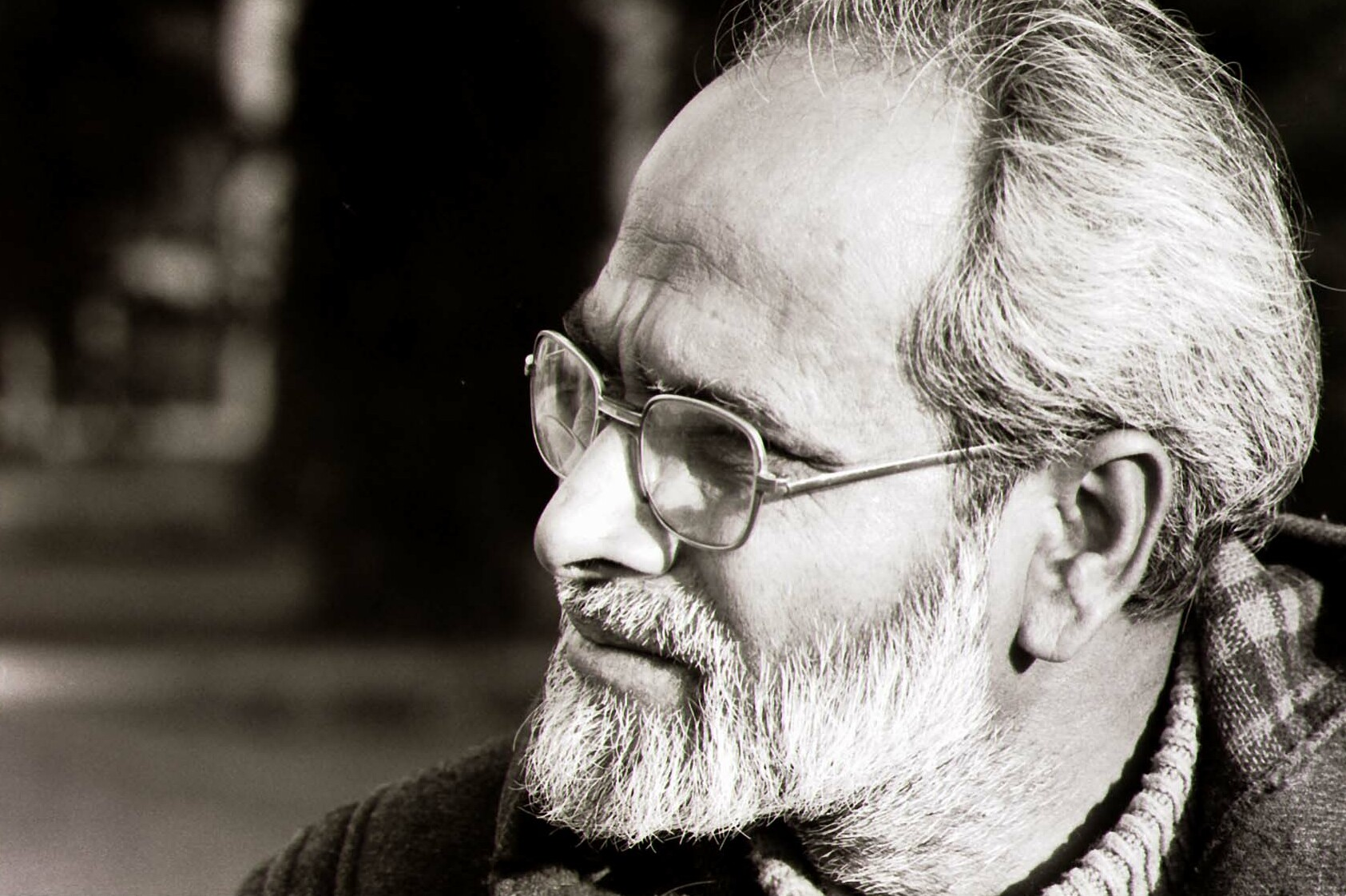
- Parkash in 1986
- Born: 7 April 1932; Nawanshahar, Punjab Province, British India
- Died: 30 March 2025 (aged 92); Jalandhar, Punjab, India
- Occupations: Writer, farmer, teacher, editor, translator

Prem Parkash (7 April 1932 – 30 March 2025) was an Indian writer from Punjab, who "was one of the major short story writers in post-1947 East Punjabi literature." He was also known as Prem Parkash Khannvi.

== Life and career ==
Parkash's native village is Bdeenpur, which once belonged to the Nabha dynasty. He took his basic education from Bhadson village and then went to Khanna for matriculation.. He did J.B.T. from Christian Basic Training School Kharar. He completed his graduation in 1963–64 and then post-graduation from Panjab University, Chandigarh in Urdu.

Parkash began his career as a farmer in Badgujjran near Amloh. He then taught in a primary school from 1953 up to 1962 then worked as an editor of an Urdu newspaper in Jalandhar from 1964 up to 1969 and then as a sub-editor for Hind Samachar from 1969 to 1990. In 1970, he started a literary magazine, Lakeer, in collaboration with Surjit Hans. He died on 30 March 2025, at the age of 92.

== Works ==
Some of his works include:

=== Stories ===
- ਕੱਚਕੜੇ (1966) – Kacche Ghadhe
- ਨਮਾਜ਼ੀ (1971) – Namazi
- ਮੁਕਤੀ (1980) – Mukti
- ਸ਼੍ਵੇਤਾਂਬਰ ਨੇ ਕਿਹਾ ਸੀ (1983) – Shetambar ne kiha si
- ਕੁਝ ਅਣਕਿਹਾ ਵੀ (1990) (Awarded the Sahitya Akademi Award) – Kuchh Ankiha vi
- ਰੰਗਮੰਚ ਤੇ ਭਿਕਸ਼ੂ (1995) – Rangmunch te Bhikshu
- ਸੁਣਦੈਂ ਖ਼ਲੀਫ਼ਾ (2001) – Sundaen Khalifa
- ਕਥਾ ਅਨੰਤ (all stories in a single volume) (1995) – Katha Anant
- Deadline and Other stories (2001)

== Stories adapted for films ==
- ਬੰਗਲਾ – Bangla
- ਮਾੜਾ ਬੰਦਾ – Mada Banda
- ਡਾਕਟਰ ਸ਼ਕੁੰਤਲਾ – Doctor Shakuntala
- ਗੋਈ – Goi
- ਨਿਰਵਾਣ – Nirvaan

== Awards won ==
- Punjabi Sahit Academy 1982
- Bhai Veer Singh Vartak Puraskar 1986
- Sahitya Academi (National) 1992
- Punjabi Sahit Academy, Delhi 1994
- Punjabi Sahit Academy, Ludhiana 1996
- Katha Samman, Katha Sansthan, Delhi 1996–97
- Shiromani Sahitkar, Bhasha Vibhag, Punjab 2002
- Punjabi Sahit Rattan, Bhasha Vibhag, Punjab 2011
- Punjab Gaurav, Punjab Kala Parishad 2019
- Sahitya Akademi Translation Prize

=== Autobiography ===
- ਬੰਦੇ ਅੰਦਰ ਬੰਦੇ (1993) – Bande Andar Bande
- ਆਤਮ ਮਾਯਾ (2005) – Atam Maya
- ਮੇਰੀ ਉਰਦੂ ਅਖਬਾਰ ਨਵੀਸੀ (2007) – Meri Urdu Akhbar Navisi
- ਦੇਖ ਬੰਦੇ ਦੇ ਭੇਖ (2013) – Dekh Bande de Bhekh
