= Gurpreet Singh Wander =

Indian cardiologist (born 1960)

Gurpreet Singh
- Born: 25 March 1960 (age 66)
- Education: MBBS and MD
- Alma mater: Government Medical College, Patiala
- Occupations: Cardiologist; academic
- Awards: Dr. B. C. Roy Award

Gurpreet Singh Wander (born 25 March 1960) is a cardiologist and academic based in Ludhiana, Punjab, India. He is currently working as Principal at the Dayanand Medical College and Hospital. He is the Chief Editor of The Yearbook of Medicine 2018 and The Progress in Medicine & Medicine Update 2016. He has also been an active contributor to the cardiology section of the popular API Textbook of Medicine (8th, 9th, 10th and 11th editions). He was awarded the Dr. B. C. Roy Award in 2006 for the Development of Specialties.

== Early life ==
Wander was born on 25 March 1960 in Amritsar, Punjab to late Harjit Singh Wander who was a former professor and head of department at Government Medical College, Patiala. He pursued MBBS in 1981 followed by Doctorate of Medicine in Cardiology from Government Medical College, Patiala, Punjabi University in 1987.

== Career ==
Wander started his career by joining the faculty and the in-charge of the Dayanand Medical College at their Department of Medicine in 1988. He started the cardiology unit at Dayanand Medical College and Hospital in 1988. Wander was elected as national president of the Association of Physicians of India (API).

In July 2023, he has been appointed as the chairman of the board of management of the Baba Farid University of Health Sciences (BFUHS), Faridkot by Punjab Government under Section 27(2) of the Baba Farid University of Health Sciences, Act, 1998.

== Research ==
- Wander has published 120 papers, 45 of them in foreign journals of repute like The Lancet, Nature, Journal of Genetics, Journal of American College of Cardiology, The American Journal of Cardiology, British Heart Journal and Japanese Heart Journal. He has presented 115 papers at national and international conferences. He had conducted a few animal experiment studies on atherogenicity of oxidised cholesterol and a British collaborative study on coronary heart disease. He has been co-supervisor of post-graduation MD/MS thesis for Panjab University, Chandigarh and Baba Farid University, Faridkot, Punjab.
- In 2020, he was part of the research team (IIT Delhi, IIT Madras, University of Melbourne, Queen Mary University of London, and Dayanand Medical College and Hospital) that developed a real-life healthcare application platform called HealthFog to automatically analyze and identify heart diseases. More than 700 researchers have adopted this work to extend it for various IoT applications, and it becomes the most famous research of Wander.
