= Surjit Hans =

Indian writer (1930–2020)

Professor Surjit Hans
- ਸੁਰਜੀਤ ਹਾਂਸ
- Born: 31 October 1930; Doaba, Punjab, India
- Died: 17 January 2020 (aged 89); Mohali, Punjab, India
- Education: English; Philosophy
- Alma mater: Panjab University Swami Sarvanand Giri Regional Centre, Hoshiarpur
- Occupations: Writer; Scholar; Historian; Teacher; Poet
- Children: Nanki Hans (daughter)
- Writing career
- Language: Punjabi, English
- Years active: 1993–2020
- Subjects: Literature; Language; Psychology; History; Philosophy
- Notable works: Mittti Di Dheri, Mrit Da Sapna, Loon Di Dali; Punjabi translation of Macbeth, Henry VIII, The Two Noble Kinsmen, On the Origin of Species
- Notable awards: Sahitya Akademi

Surjit Hans (31 October 1930 – 17 January 2020), also appears as Surjeet Hans, was an Indian writer, tragedian, scholar and lecturer. (Note: see also wikt:tragedian. The subject can be also referred to Shakespearean tragedian) He is also credited with being a "translator" for translating all the tragedies and thirty eight plays of William Shakespeare into Punjabi language. His name also appears in "historians" and "poets" for his research on history of Sikhism and writing novels and poems. Hans wrote sixty books, including Mittti Di Dheri, Loon Di Dali and Mrit Da Sapna throughout his life.

He became the recipient of a literary honor Sahitya Akademi Award twice in recognition of his contribution to the Punjabi literature and language. (Note: the awards were based in Punjab and Chandigarh than in Delhi) It is believed he spent more than twenty years living a "Bard of Avon" life since he started translation work, including Macbeth which he did in 1955. (Note: Bard of Avon is a title given to an English poet William Shakespeare) In 2013, he received an honorary appreciation by the Ealing London Borough Council for his contribution to Shakespearean tragedies.

== Early life ==
Hans was born in Doaba area of Punjab, India on 31 October 1930. After completing his primary and secondary schooling, he attended the Panjab University Swami Sarvanand Giri Regional Centre, Hoshiarpur where he studied English and Philosophy. He took a keen interest in Shakespeare's writings after receiving education from professor Dinah Stock, and later in 1965, he went to Southall, London and worked as a postman at the Heathrow Airport as well as a bus conductor. He stayed there for six to seven years. Hans joined Royal Shakespeare Company and started working on Shakespeare's projects.

In 1973, he returned to his hometown and joined Guru Nanak Dev University in the Department of Guru Nanak Studies where he worked as a lecturer. Later in 1981 he became head of the department, and from 1986 to 1989 and 1990 to 1991 he was a faculty member of History Department of same university until his retirement in 1993. He published his first doctoral project on Sikh literature titled "A Reconstruction of Sikh History" which is recognized as a prominent research among his other work. It is believed he was inspired by methodology of a New Zealand scholar W. H. McLeod. He was also involved in research work of Punjab's insurgency.

== Literary career ==
Hans chiefly wrote about literature, language, psychology, history, and philosophy. As a fellow at the Punjabi University, Patiala, he began translating Shakespeare's projects into Punjabi on 1 January 1993 with Othello tragedy. As a translator for twenty years, he played multiple fictional characters' roles, including Laertes in Hamlet and Seyton in Macbeth, and is also credited with translating Henry VIII that was his last work and Charles Darwin's On the Origin of Species. He also used to write novels and poetry themed psychology and social. His prominent publications include Mitti Di Dheri, Gallo, Apsara, Pushtan, Harijan, Loon Di Dali, Imtihan, and Sikh Ki Karan. He wrote about the all ethnic groups of Punjab in one of his research works titled Jallianwala Bagh: The Construction of a Nationalist Symbol that appeared in the prominent publications.

=== Assignments ===
Hans was employed or assigned to translate Shakespeare's work by the Punjabi University. The university used to offer him ₹8,000 for each play. It is claimed that each play he used to complete was done in a time span of six months.

== Death ==
On 31 August 2014, he suffered from a myocardial infarction but recovered later. On 17 January 2020, he died of chronic condition in Mohali city of Punjab.

== See also ==
- List of Indian writers
- Rana Nayar
- Tapan Kumar Pradhan
