= Kaidupur =

- village
- Location in Punjab, India Kaidupur (India)
- Coordinates: 30.26°N 76.12°E
- Country: India
- State: Punjab
- District: Patiala

Languages
  - Official: Punjabi
- Time zone: UTC+5:30 (IST)
- Vehicle registration: PB-
- Coastline: 0 kilometres (0 mi)

Kaidupur is an Indian village situated in Patiala District, Punjab. It lies on the Nabha-Bhadson road with Nabha being nine km away on one side and Bhadson on the other.

== Famous people ==
Although small in size, Kaidupur is big in name due to its people. There are the famous Dera that are scantily clad for religious purposes and believe in the philosophy of self detachment. Late St. Radha muni was the founder of spiritual practices and religious beliefs. He is also said to have established the first Durga Mandir in the village premises about four decades ago.

== Other things ==
The main occupation of the people in Kaidupur is agriculture.

The chief attire of the people is traditional Punjabi.
