= IGCE =

IGCE may refer to:

- Indo Global College of Engineering
- Independent Government Cost Estimate
