= Om Prakash Upadhyaya =

Indian ayurvedic physician

- Born: 2 June 1951 (age 74); Maandal, Bhilwara, Rajasthan, India
- Occupation: Ayurveda practitioner
- Spouse: Bhanwari devi
- Awards: Padma Shri

Om Prakash Upadhyaya is an Indian Ayurveda practitioner and the vice chancellor of Guru Ravidas Ayurved University. The Government of India honoured him, in 2014, with the award of Padma Shri, the fourth highest civilian award, for his contributions to the fields of medicine.

== Biography ==
Born in Maandal in the Bhilwara district of Rajasthan, India, Professor Om Prakash Upadhyaya chose academics in Ayurveda as his career. He was the Professor and the Head of the Department at the National Institute of Ayurveda, Jaipur before he was appointed as the Vice Chancellor of Guru Ravidas Ayurved University, Hoshiarpur in July 2011.
