= Ajaib Singh Brar =

Indian academic administrator

Emeritus Professor Ajaib Singh Brar
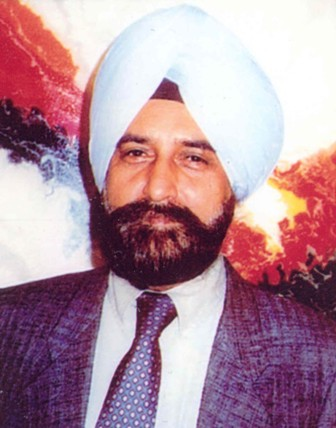

Vice-chancellor of Guru Nanak Dev University
- In office 2009-2017
- Preceded by: Jai Rup Singh Pannu
- Succeeded by: Jaspal Singh Sandhu

Personal details
- Born: 1947 (age 78–79)
- Education: Indian Institute of Technology (IIT), Delhi
- Awards: Saraswati Samman (2009): For contributions to education; Fellow: National Academy of Sciences, India

Ajaib Singh Brar is an Indian academic, researcher, and university administrator. He served as the vice-chancellor of Guru Nanak Dev University (GNDU), Amritsar, from July 15, 2009, until 2017. Prior to this, he was the vice-chancellor of the University of Lucknow

== Education ==
Brar received a bachelor's degree in Faridkot, Punjab in 1968. He later earned a Master of Science degree from Punjabi University, Patiala, and obtained a Ph.D. in chemistry from the Indian Institute of Technology (IIT), Delhi, in 1977. During his doctoral studies, he was awarded a UNESCO fellowship, supporting his research in the field of chemistry.

== Career ==
Brar began his teaching career as a lecturer in chemistry at Guru Nanak Dev University (GNDU), Amritsar, from 1976 to 1982.

In 1982, Brar joined IIT Delhi as an assistant professor of chemistry and eventually became a professor in the Higher Academic Grade. His responsibilities included:

- Head of the Department of Chemistry
- Joint Professor at the Centre for Polymer Science and Engineering

At IIT Delhi, Brar contributed to the establishment of the High-Resolution NMR Center and was involved in organizing national entrance exams like GATE, JMET, and DRDO-SET for recruiting scientists for the Defense Research and Development Organization (DRDO).

Brar served as the vice-chancellor of the University of Lucknow from January 2008 to 2009.

In 2009, Brar returned to GNDU as vice-chancellor. He established a Centre for Genetic Disorders.
