= Indian Institute of Management Amritsar =

Public Business school located in Punjab, India

- Type: Public Business School
- Established: 2015
- Chairman: Sanjay Gupta
- Director: Samir K. Srivastava
- Students: 250
- Location: Amritsar, Punjab, India; 31.5706874°N 74.9866509°E
- Campus: Urban, 60 acres (0.24 km^{2})
- Website: iimamritsar.ac.in

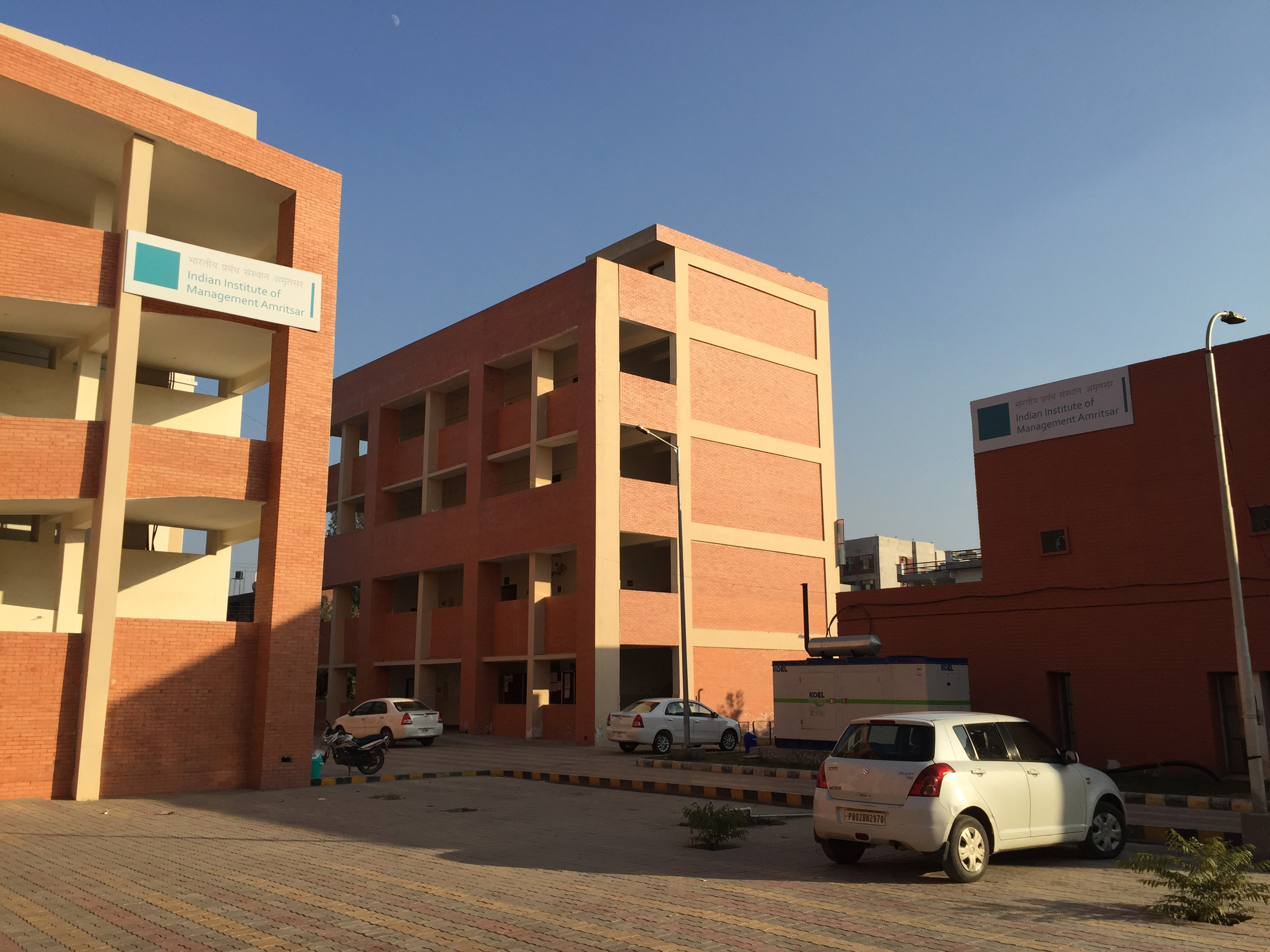
IIM Amritsar in December 2015

The Indian Institute of Management Amritsar (IIM Amritsar) is a Public Business School and an Institute of National Importance located in Amritsar, Punjab, India established by Ministry of Human Resource Development in 2015. It is one of the young members of the Indian Institutes of Management (IIMs) Umbrella established in 2015. The institute was inaugurated by Surjit Singh Rakhra, the then Minister of Higher Education and Languages, Punjab on 6 August 2015.

== Campus ==
IIM Amritsar was temporarily located within the campus of Government Polytechnic College, Amritsar till it moved to its own eco-friendly campus of approximately 60 acres, which was constructed at Manawala on Amritsar-Jalandhar GT Road, in 10 years time.

=== Student Accommodation ===
The hostels are located at the permanent campus at Manawala. All basic amenities like air conditioners, geysers, washing machines, etc. are provided. In addition to these, recreational facilities and round the clock library access are available.

=== Logo ===
The geometry and colors in the logo of IIM Amritsar hold specific meanings. According to the institute, the logo is inspired from the "Flower of Life" design located in the Golden Temple, and is modified to pentagonal geometry representing Punjab. While the blue and green elements represent rivers of Punjab and prosperity earned by the hard-working farmers, the five-edged star in the center represents the command over five human senses.

A nationwide public competition was organized on myGOV portal for duration from 18 December 2017 till 19 January 2018 by IIM Amritsar for Logo and moto design. The winners were announced on myGOV blog on 16 September 2019. The logo designed by Mr. Prashant Anant Patil was selected as official logo of IIM Amritsar.

== See also ==
- Guru Nanak Dev University
- List of institutions of higher education in Punjab
