= Dr. B. R. Ambedkar State Institute of Medical Sciences =

Dr. B.R. Ambedkar State Institute of Medical Sciences
- Other names: Mohali Medical College; AIMS Mohali
- Type: Medical College and hospital
- Established: 2021; 5 years ago
- Affiliations: National Medical Commission
- Academic affiliations: Baba Farid University of Health Sciences
- Director-Principal: Dr. Navdeep Singh Saini
- Location: Mohali, Punjab, India, India
- Website: https://aimsmohali.punjab.gov.in/

Dr. B.R. Ambedkar State Institute of Medical Sciences (AIMS Mohali) is a public tertiary medical college and hospital located in SAS Nagar (Mohali), Punjab, India. Established in 2021, the institute offers the undergraduate medical degree of Bachelor of Medicine and Bachelor of Surgery (MBBS). The college is recognized by National Medical Commission and is affiliated with the Baba Farid University of Health Sciences. Like all other Indian medical colleges, student admission in this college happens on the basis of merit through National Eligibility and Entrance Test. The hospital associated with this college is one of the largest hospitals in Mohali.

== Courses ==
Dr. B.R. Ambedkar State Institute of Medical Sciences undertakes the education and training of students in MBBS courses.
