= Adesh Institute of Medical Sciences & Research =

Private medical college in Punjab, India

Coordinates: 30.222209°N 75.058641°E

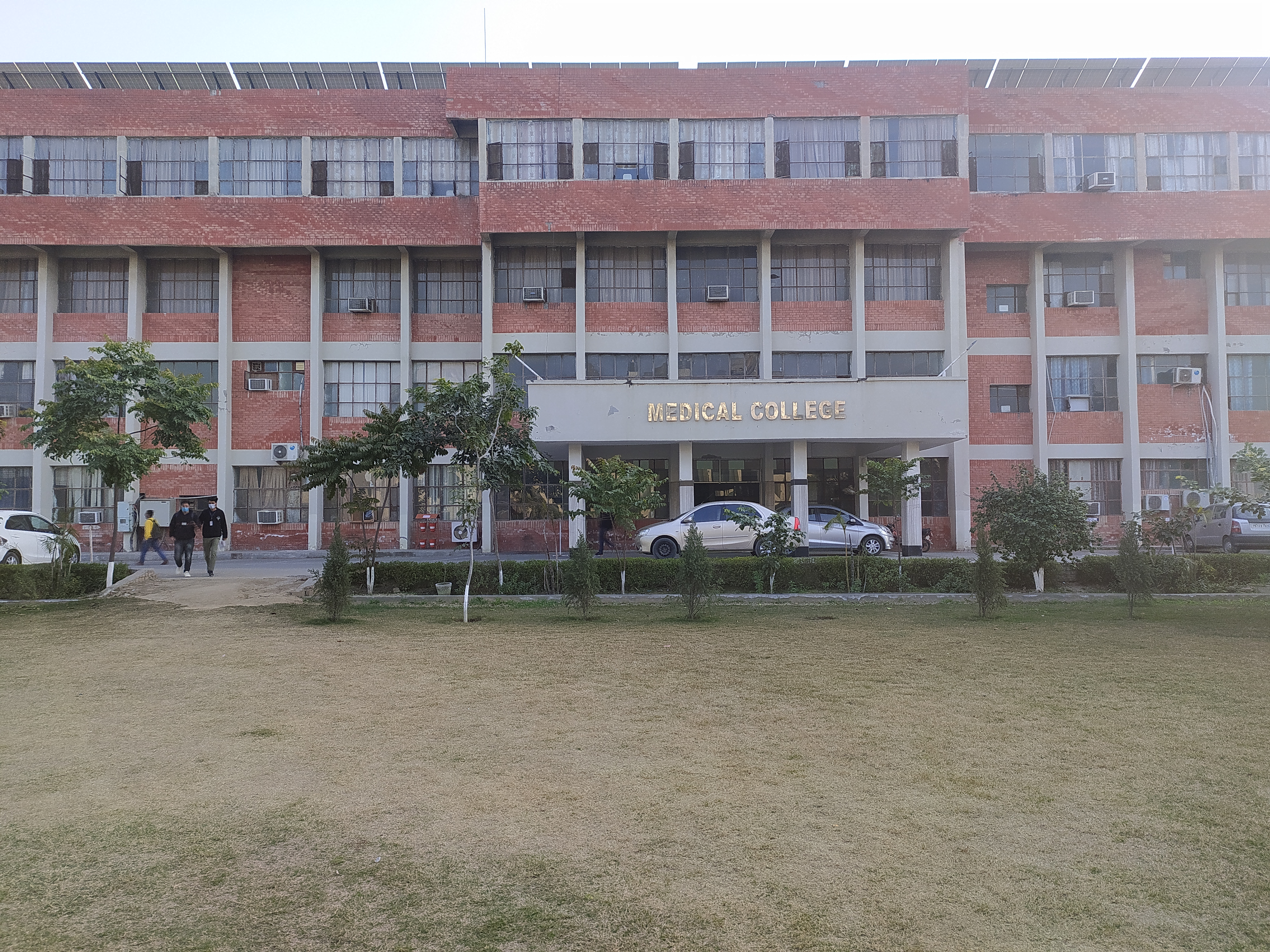
- Type: Private
- Established: 2006
- Affiliations: National Medical Commission
- Academic affiliations: Adesh University
- Principal: Dr. Parmod Kumar Goyal
- Undergraduates: MBBS: 150
- Location: Bathinda, Punjab, India
- Website: aimsr.adeshuniversity.ac.in

Adesh Institute of Medical Science and Research (AIMSR) is a private medical college associated with a 750-bed tertiary care teaching hospital. It has 150 M.B.B.S. annual seat intake. The college is located on the Barnala Bathinda Highway in the district Bathinda of Punjab, India. The campus is spread out on 100 acres (40 ha). The college was established in 2006 under Adesh Institutions. AIMSR is approved by National Medical Commission and permitted by Ministry of Health & Family Welfare.

== Affiliated university ==
It was affiliated to Baba Farid University of Health Sciences, Faridkot from 2006 to 2011 MBBS Admissions Batch and is affiliated to Adesh University, Bathinda starting 2012 MBBS Admissions Batch.

== Recognitions ==
AIMSR is approved by the Medical Council of India, Ministry of Health and Family Welfare, Govt. of India

== Awards ==
Adesh University, Bathinda, the currently affiliated university was awarded the "Six Sigma Healthcare Excellence Award" – Oscars of Indian Healthcare, under the category "Best Healthcare Academic Institution of the Year" in December 2015.

== Controversy ==
Dr. Gurprit Gill, MD of Adesh Medical College, Bathinda, and principal Sarabjit Singh were arrested by the State Vigilance Bureau (VB) on charges of admitting ineligible candidates and fraudulently issuing D-Pharmacy degrees in collusion with registrars and officials of the Punjab State Pharmacy Council (PSPC).
