= Punjab Sports University =

Sports state university in Punjab, India

Maharaja Bhupinder Singh Punjab Sports University
- Motto: Nishe Kar Apni Jeet karon
- Type: State
- Established: August 2019; 7 years ago
- Affiliations: UGC
- Chancellor: Governor of Punjab
- Vice-Chancellor: Dr. Pushpinder Singh Gill
- Location: Punjab, India; 30°23′33″N 76°19′04″E
- Website: mbspsu.ac.in

Punjab Sports University, officially Maharaja Bhupinder Singh Punjab Sports University (MBSPSU), is a residential and affiliating sports state university in Patiala, Punjab, India.

== History ==
A sports university in Punjab was announced by the Government of Punjab in June 2017. In July 2019 it was decided to name it after Maharaja Bhupinder Singh. It was established in August 2019 thorough The Maharaja Bhupinder Singh Punjab Sports University Act, 2019 and approved by the University Grants Commission (UGC) in September of that year. Jagbir Singh Cheema was appointed the first Vice-Chancellor.

== Campus ==
The university was started from a transit campus at Prof. Gursewak Singh Government College of Physical Education. It will have a permanent campus of 97 acres (39 ha) in Sidhowal village, Patiala district adjacent to the Rajiv Gandhi National University of Law.
