= Punjab Institute of Medical Sciences =

Medical college in Jalandhar, India

- ਪੰਜਾਬ ਇੰਸਟੀਚਿਊਟ ਆਫ਼ ਮੈਡੀਕਲ ਸਾਇੰਸਿਜ਼
- Other name: PIMS Jalandhar
- Motto: Healthcare for Everyone
- Type: Run in PPP Mode with Govt. of Punjab by PIMS Medical & Education Charitable Society
- Established: 1999
- Academic affiliations: Baba Farid University of Health Sciences
- Chairman: Dr. Kanwaljit Singh
- Principal: Dr. Rajiv Arora
- Director: Gurkirat Singh
- Faculty: c. 200
- Students: More than 2000 admitted (750 currently studying)
- Undergraduates: 750 MBBS
- Postgraduates: 10
- Location: Jalandhar, Punjab, India; 31.307°N 75.596°E
- Campus: 55 acres (22 ha)
- Colours: Green
- Website: www.pimsj.com

Punjab Institute of Medical Sciences (PIMS Jalandhar) is a medical college, hospital and medical research institute based in Jalandhar, India.

== Location and function ==
Punjab Institute of Medical Sciences (PIMS) spans over 55 acres situated in the centre of Jalandhar, Punjab. It was first projected by the Government of Punjab (GoP) in 1999 to be the first medical college cum teaching hospital in the Doaba region, conceptualised under a public private partnership (PPP) between the PIMS Society, PMS Medical and Education Charitable Society, Department of Medical Education & Research and the GoP to be a tertiary care teaching hospital. The medical college is affiliated with the Baba Farid University of Health Sciences. The institute is presently administrated by Executive Chairman Dr. Kanwaljit Singh, Director Principal Dr. Rajiv Arora, Hospital Director Mr. Gurkirat Singh and Medical Superintendent Dr. Seema Dutt Bandhu. A total six M.B.B.S batches (including interns) amassing more than 900 doctors-in-training. PIMS has an annual intake of 150 students per batch, making it one of the most competitive medical colleges in Doaba. PIMS also offers DNB courses in Psychiatry, Respiratory Medicine, Anesthesia, Immunohematology and Blood Transfusion, Paediatrics, General Medicine, General Surgery, Obstetrics and Gynaecology.

== Departments ==
The hospital has many clinical departments including medicine, general surgery, orthopedics, gynecology and obstetrics, pediatrics, ophthalmology, dermatology and venerology, psychiatry, dentistry, physiotherapy, nephrology, urology, plastic and reconstructive surgery, medical oncology, ENT, chest and TB. The O.P.D. charges are based on P.G.I. norms. The hospital also has pathological, biochemical and microbiological including COVID-19 RT-PCR and Rapid Antigen Testing (RAT) diagnostic facilities with highly specialized laboratories and imaging techniques including X-Ray, Ultrasound and CT scan. The institute has a blood bank, dialysis unit, COVID-19 treatment facility and round the clock emergency services. PIMS also has a functioning Anti-Retroviral Therapy (ART) centre under National AIDS Control Programme (NACP) in its premises.

== Charitable work ==
PIMS Jalandhar, works to serve the society through various charitable endeavors like organizing regular medical camps and check-ups in areas deprived of medical facilities and has adopted 15 villages in the surrounding areas of the city. The President of India on 26-June-2018 conferred the National Award-2018 to Punjab Institute of Medical Sciences (PIMS), Jalandhar in the category of ‘Best Educational Institution’ in recognition of its outstanding and exemplary services in the field of Prevention of Alcoholism and Substance (Drug) Abuse in the state of Punjab. PIMS de-addiction OPD caters to an average of 350 cases per month. In order to reach out to a larger population, the Departments of Psychiatry and Community Medicine, PIMS jointly started a campaign- ‘Nasha Mukti Abhiyan’ in 2015 wherein 15 villages in the vicinity of Jalandhar were adopted with an aim to make them drug free. Under this campaign, free medical check-ups were provided along with psychiatric counseling. Health Talks were delivered in the community and schools on topics like Types of Illicit Drugs, Harmful Effects of Drugs on Health, Family and Community, Methods of Prevention and Knowledge regarding Referral Centres etc. PIMS MBBS students organized and performed fifty seven Nukkad Nataks to sensitizing the public about drug abuse. The intent of the campaign was to decrease the overall level of substance abuse in the concerned villages and increase the awareness regarding harmful effects of substance abuse.

== Education ==
The college building consists of classrooms, lecture theatres, labs, museums, a grand central library and a computer centre and has many non clinical departments like anatomy, physiology, pharmacology, community medicine, forensic medicine etc. The college is now offering 6 paramedical courses also. PIMS organized various CMEs and conferences including TRANSCON 2019, the 44th National Conference of ISBTI, on its campus. Recently the medical college hosted its second convocation ceremony in which 180 MBBS pass-outs from 2016 to 2018 batch were awarded degrees. The chief guest on the occasion was Dr Balbir Singh, Honorable Minister of Health and Family Welfare, Medical Education and Research, Government of Punjab.

== See also ==
- Baba Farid University of Health Sciences
- PGIMER Chandigarh
- List of medical colleges in India
