= Panjab University Swami Sarvanand Giri Regional Centre, Hoshiarpur =

Regional center of Panjab University in India

Panjab University Swami Sarvanand Giri Regional Centre
- Motto: Sanskrit: तमसो मा ज्योतिर्गमय
- Motto in English: Lead us into the Light from Darkness
- Type: Public State University
- Established: 2001; 25 years ago
- Founder: Dr. Lajpat Rai Munger
- Parent institution: Panjab University, Chandigarh
- Affiliations: Panjab University, UGC
- Director: Dr. Satish Kumar
- Faculty: 50+
- Students: 2100+
- Undergraduates: B.E.: 1,200 students ; B.A.LL.B/LL.B: 670 students
- Postgraduates: 260+
- Location: Bajwara-Una Road, Hoshiarpur, Bajwara, Hoshiarpur 146021, Punjab, India
- Campus: 10.86 acres (4.39 ha); Rural
- Nickname: PUSSGRC
- Website: ssgpurch.puchd.ac.in

Panjab University Swami Sarvanand Giri Regional Centre (PUSSGRC) is a regional center of Panjab University, located in Bajwara village, Hoshiarpur district, Punjab, India. It is situated 7 km from the main city of Hoshiarpur. It is the largest multi faculty off-campus establishment of PU.

Panjab University was established in 1882 at Lahore (now in Pakistani Punjab). In 1956 the university was relocated to Chandigarh. The university has 74 teaching and research departments and 15 centres/chairs for teaching and research at the main campus located at Chandigarh. It has 202 affiliated colleges spread over districts of Punjab state and union-territory of Chandigarh, with Regional Centres at Sri Muktsar Sahib, Ludhiana and Hoshiarpur.

The campus offers engineering, IT and law programs under the university’s affiliation. The campus has classrooms, laboratories and workshops for teaching students. It is furnished with a library, dispensary, canteen and hostel facility for over 520 students, 170 boys and 350 girls. The campus also offers NSS, NCC and all other necessary sports amenities. It also houses an air-conditioned auditorium with a seating capacity of more than 300 persons for academic and cultural activities.

== History ==
The institution began as the Swami Sarvanand Gir Institute of Information Technology (SSGIIT), a private engineering and IT college built in Bajwara by Lajpat Rai Munger around 1999–2001. Munger constructed the campus—including classrooms, laboratories, and hostels—as a goodwill gesture toward his native Punjab. The institute had an academic tie-up with California State University, Fresno, USA. Despite its modern infrastructure, Munger faced severe bureaucratic hurdles in India; local officials demanded bribes to approve courses.

Frustrated by corruption, Munger decided to donate the college to the public sector. In early 2006, he formally offered the campus to Panjab University. On February 3, 2006, Munger "gave away" the Rs. 21 Crores or 200 million (≈$4.5 million) campus spread over 11 acres to Panjab University. The handover came after Munger approached university vice chancellor K. N. Pathak and decided to gift the college. Panjab University took over the facilities and began running its own engineering and computer science courses there from the next academic session.

After the donation, the campus was incorporated as a regional centre of Panjab University on Monday, July 10, 2006. It was initially named Swami Sarvanand Giri Panjab University Regional Centre, Hoshiarpur. In 2011, the institute was officially renamed Panjab University Swami Sarvanand Giri Regional Centre, Hoshiarpur to reflect its affiliation. Under Panjab University, the centre expanded its programs: today it includes the University Institute of Engineering & Technology (UIET) offering B.E. degrees in Computer Science, Electronics, Information Technology, and Mechanical, as well as a University Institute of Legal Studies (UILS) for law degrees like BALLB, LLB, LLM and Department of Computer Science & Applications (DCSA) for MCA.

== Founder – Dr. Lajpat Rai Munger ==
Dr. Lajpat Rai Munger (1917–2016) was an Indian-American philanthropist and entrepreneur from Hoshiarpur district. Born in Nangal Shahidan, Punjab, he joined the Punjab Police at age 16 and served as a constable in Hoshiarpur and Ludhiana. In 1966 he emigrated to the United States and trained as a medical doctor. Over the next decades, he became a successful farmer and businessman in California—at one point owning among the world’s largest blueberry and pistachio farms with an annual turnover around $30 million.

After retiring from farming in 1988, Munger returned to India to pursue social causes. He built and funded numerous institutions in Punjab, often invoking the name of his mentor Swami Sarvanand Giri. He established a charitable hospital and a temple in Hoshiarpur and a fully equipped school in Bajwara. Munger was known locally for a free village dispensary he set up in Mal Majara, where patients were treated for just one rupee. He also sponsored K–12 education by upgrading classrooms with modern technology and funded scholarships for Punjabi students. For his contributions to education, California State University, Fresno awarded him an honorary Doctor of Humane Letters on May 17, 2003.

Munger’s most prominent project was the engineering college in Bajwara. He donated the Swami Sarvanand Gir Institute of Information Technology to Panjab University in 2006 after repeatedly running into corruption in India. In addition to the college campus, Munger donated 22 acres near Hoshiarpur and funds to establish a new law and nursing college (though the university later decided not to run all of them, as unable to do so). Throughout his life he remained deeply influenced by his guru’s teachings of service and honesty. Munger died in August 2016, leaving behind a legacy of educational philanthropy in Punjab.

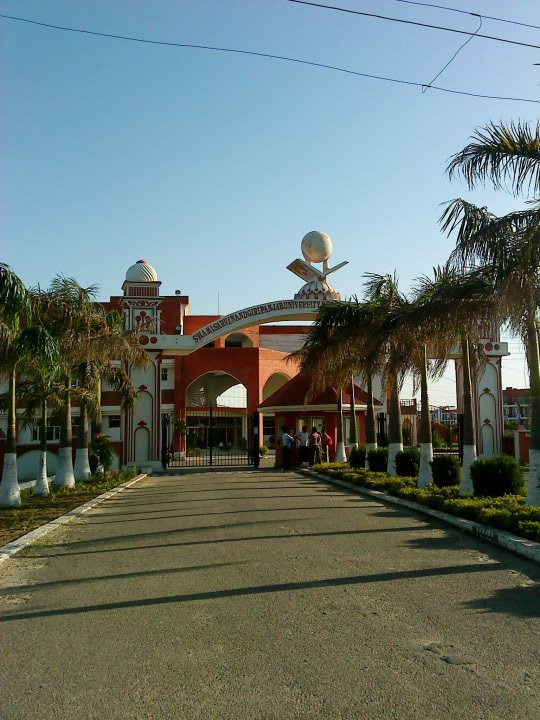
Entrance of the PUSSGRC

== Departments ==
=== University Institute of Engineering & Technology (UIET Hoshiarpur) ===
The Engineering department of PUSSGRC combines several technical streams, enrolling more than 1000 students. It encompasses a Computer Science and Engineering department, an Electronics and Communication department, a Mechanical Engineering department and an Information Technology department. Degrees include:

- B.E. Computer Science and Engineering
- B.E. Electronics and Communications Engineering
- B.E. Information technology (started w.e.f. session 2011–12)
- B.E. Mechanical Engineering

=== Department of Computer Science & Applications (DCSA) ===
PUSSGRC offers a two year, full-time Master of Computer Applications (MCA) degree. The course covers various aspects of computational theory, Computer programming, algorithm design and optimization, work and data-base management, mobile technologies, mathematics, probability, statistics, accounting, finance, etc.

DCSA also offers 1 year Post Graduate Diploma in Computer Applications (PGDCA).

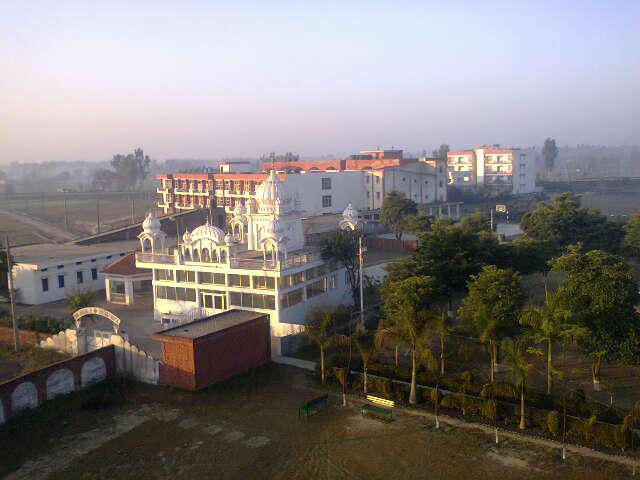
PUSSGRC

=== University Institute of Legal Studies (UILS) ===
PUSSGRC provides education in Indian law. UILS Department offers 3 years LLB & 5 years integrated BA-LLB programme.

It also offers 1 year LLM program. (started w.e.f. session 2020-2021)

== Admissions ==
Admission is on the basis of JEE-Mains (formerly AIEEE). Candidates with JEE-Mains Scorecard have to apply for JAC, Chandigarh counselling to get admission in the UIET. The candidates having compartment in 10+2 examination held in the current year are not eligible for admission.

MCA and LLB/B.A.LL.B admissions are through the PU CET test merits.

== Training and Placement Cell ==
PUSSGRC has a training and placement program headed by Dr. Vrajesh Sharma. The program operates training and placement activities that are undertaken by teacher and student coordinators. Students from all departments are selected through personal interviews conducted by the faculty members of the cell. Besides opening job avenues for the students, the cell ensures that students are well equipped to meet the requirements of the industry. The joint placements are also conducted by the Central Placement Cell and UIET, Panjab University Chandigarh for the students of this campus in Chandigarh.

Students have found posts in firms such as Birlasoft, Infosys, Accenture, Igate Patni, Dell, Infogain, Nucleus Software, Wipro, Ambuja Cement, IBM, Mahindra & Mahindra, Sml Isuzu, Sonalika International Tractors, Josh Technologies Group (JTG), Larsen & Toubro Limited (L&T), Penthara Technologies, Intellipaat, Cognizant, HashedIn, Unthinkable Solutions, Alert En-terprises, Quark, TT Consultants, Auxilobits, Growth Natives, McKinley Rice and many more.

== Student Welfare Society (SWS) ==
The Students Welfare Society (SWS) is headed by Student Welfare Incharge who holds responsibility for various extra-curricular and cultural activities in the campus. SWS organized events such as guest lectures, sports meets, annual festival, etc. Successful events included AAROHAN 2009, AAROHAN 2010, ANANT 2011, ANANT 2012 and ANANT 2K13. The SWS also provides funds for the bus facility to the students for placements.

== Events & Fests ==
=== Aequitas 2024 ===
Aequitas'24 was a national law and cultural fest organized from 15 to 17 February 2024. The event aimed to promote legal awareness, cultural expression, and practical skills among students. It featured multiple competitions including Moot Court, Client Counseling, Judgment Writing, Debate, Quiz, Theatre, Fashion Show, Group Dance, and Talent Hunt. The fest also hosted a cultural night headlined by Punjabi singer Khan Bhaini.

=== Aequitas 2020 ===
Aequitas'20 was the first-ever integrated Law and Cultural Fest organized by the PUSSGRC, Hoshiarpur. The three-day event marked a rare collaboration between legal and cultural competitions, providing a platform for budding lawyers to showcase their skills and creativity. The fest featured law events such as the National Moot Court Competition, National Client Counseling Competition and National Judgment Writing Competition, along with literary and cultural events including Diplomatic Swings, Nukkad Natak, Talent Hunt and a Bhangra Battle. The event was inaugurated by BJP National Vice-President and former Rajya Sabha MP Avinash Rai Khanna. Punjabi singer Amrit Maan was the star performer at the cultural evening.

=== Technnovation TechFest 2019 ===
Technnovation 2K19 was a three-day technology and innovation festival organized by the PUSSGRC, Hoshiarpur. The event was inaugurated by Prof. Emanual Nahar (Dean Student Welfare, Panjab University) and featured multiple technical and motivational sessions under the theme 'Changing the Obvious'. Workshops on ethical hacking, CAD modeling, artificial intelligence, and digital innovation were conducted along with events such as Hackathon, Pull a Bot and Blind Coding. Motivational speakers included Yogesh Kalia, Munish Jindal, Nitin Rai Chaudhary and popular YouTuber Kena Shree, who inspired students to pursue entrepreneurship and follow their passions.

=== MANTHAN-2013 ===
The first annual HR meet of was organized by the Training and placement cell on 13 April 2013. Prof. Naval Kishore (Dean, College Development Council, Panjab University, Chandigarh), Mr. R. L. Kapoor (Advisor & Secretary to the Vice-Chancellor, Panjab University, Chandigarh), Prof. S. K. Chadha (Director, Central Placement Cell, Panjab University, Chandigarh), Mr. Amandeep Singh Marwaha (Training & Placement Officer, UIAMS, Panjab University, Chandigarh) all attended. Two interactive panel discussions took place, titled "Meeting Industry Deficit with Empowered Youth" and "Understanding Upcoming Industry Trends".

=== Chief Justice of India Visit ===
Chief Justice of India (CJI) Altamas Kabir visited the school to talk about illegal immigration and fraudulent marriages involving NRIs. Supreme Court Judge and Executive Chairman of the National Legal Services Authority Justice D. K. Jain presided and Punjab and Haryana High Court Chief Justice A K Sikri, the patron-in-chief of the PLSA, participated.

=== ANANT ===
ANANT is the annual techno-cultural fest. The 2K13 edition was held on 4–6 April 2013 on the theme "Green Earth". The working body planned to highlight technical research and development, cultural awakening and spread the word of a clean and green environment. MP Sh. Avinash Rai Khanna and Prof Renu Vig (Director, UIET Chandigarh) on Digital Image Processing presented. The 3-day experience included technical events such as Robo Soccer, Mud Rally, Line Sychophant, Circuit King, Robo Wars, Electrical Junkyard, Code Caffeine etc., literary events such as Braniac, Symposium-the group discussion, Promethean fantasy-the picture declamation, Spur of the moment. All these events were aimed at strengthening the cultural and literary aspects and giving the students a platform to explore the horizons of these fields. Cultural events included Cotillion - a dance competition and A-la-mode - a fashion show. The last day was marked by a lecture on "Right to information" by Prof GK Chattrath. It drew students from other colleges as well. Star night featured Punjabi singer Geeta Zaildar.

== Clubs and societies ==
- VARTA - The official Literary Club of PUSSGRC
- Zamaana - Photography Club
- SHOR - The official theater group of PUSSGRC
- D-Cult (Dance Club)
- Symphonic Vibrations (Official Musical Group)
- Yantrix (Technical Club)
- Literati- The Literary Club
- National Cadet Corps "Army Wing" (Under 12 PB BN NCC, Hoshiarpur)
- Sports & Cultural Club
- Friends Welfare Society (registered NGO of PUSSGRC)
- PUSSGRC-SAE India Collegiate Club
- Hoshiarpur Mozilla Campus Club
- Ecell UIETH (Entrepreneurship Cell)
- Platform Tech Group (Techno-managerial society)

== Magazine ==
PRATIBIMB (Reflection) is the first official magazine of PUSSGRC, Hoshiarpur. The magazine is meant to reflect the achievements and talents of PUSSGRC. It is an initiative to highlight the creativity and the potential of students, showing students' creative side. It is a medium to unite the students of the departments (Engineering, Law and MCA) to work as a team.

== ALUMNI ==
• Flight Lieutenant Hina Jaiswal (First Indian Woman Flight Engineer) | Commissioned into Indian Air Force (IAF) Engineering Wing in 2015.

• Er. Priyanka Srivastava {EC Batch of 2014} (Space Systems Engineer at NASA Jet Propulsion Laboratory, Pasadena, California)

• Gulshan Sharma {Mech. Engg. Batch of 2013} (Founder & MD of Falahari- A Fruitful Habit) | Featured in FORBES - 30 Under 30 - Asia - The Arts 2020
