= Siddhartha Law College, Dehradun =

Law college in Dehradun, India

Siddhartha Law College
- Type: Private, Law college
- Established: 2009
- Affiliations: Uttarakhand Technical University
- Chairman: Mr. Durga Verma
- Principal: Dr. Sharafat Ali
- Location: Dehradun, Uttarakhand, India
- Website: http://siddharthalawcollege.com

Siddhartha Law College is a college imparting education in law in Dehradun, Uttarakhand. It was established in the year 2009 and offers a five-year integrated Bachelor of Law (B.A./B.B.A.LL.B) degree, a three-year (LL.B) degree, and a one-year Master of Law (LLM) degree. The college is affiliated with Uttarakhand Technical University.
