= Sri Guru Ram Das University of Health Sciences, Sri Amritsar =

University in Punjab

Coordinates: 31.634752°N 74.9663668°E

- Motto: Dissection to reconstruction-Producing Excellence
- Type: Private
- Established: November 2016
- Affiliations: UGC
- Chancellor: S. Harjinder Singh Dhami
- Vice-Chancellor: Dr. Manjit Singh Uppal
- Dean: Dr. A. P. Singh
- Location: Mehta Road, Vallah, Amritsar, India
- Campus: Rural
- Website: www.sgrduhs.in

Sri Guru Ram Das University of Health Sciences, Sri Amritsar is an institute of higher education in medicine and related health sciences. It was established in 2016 at Sri Amritsar, Punjab and it is named after the fourth Sikh Guru, Sri Guru Ram Das Ji. It was conferred the status of State University under the Punjab Private University Policy Act 2010, established under Punjab Act no. 43 of 2016.

== Academics ==
The university offers programs at Training, Diploma, Undergraduate, Postgraduate and Doctoral levels in Medical, Nursing and other Paramedical fields.
