= Renu Vig =

Indian academic

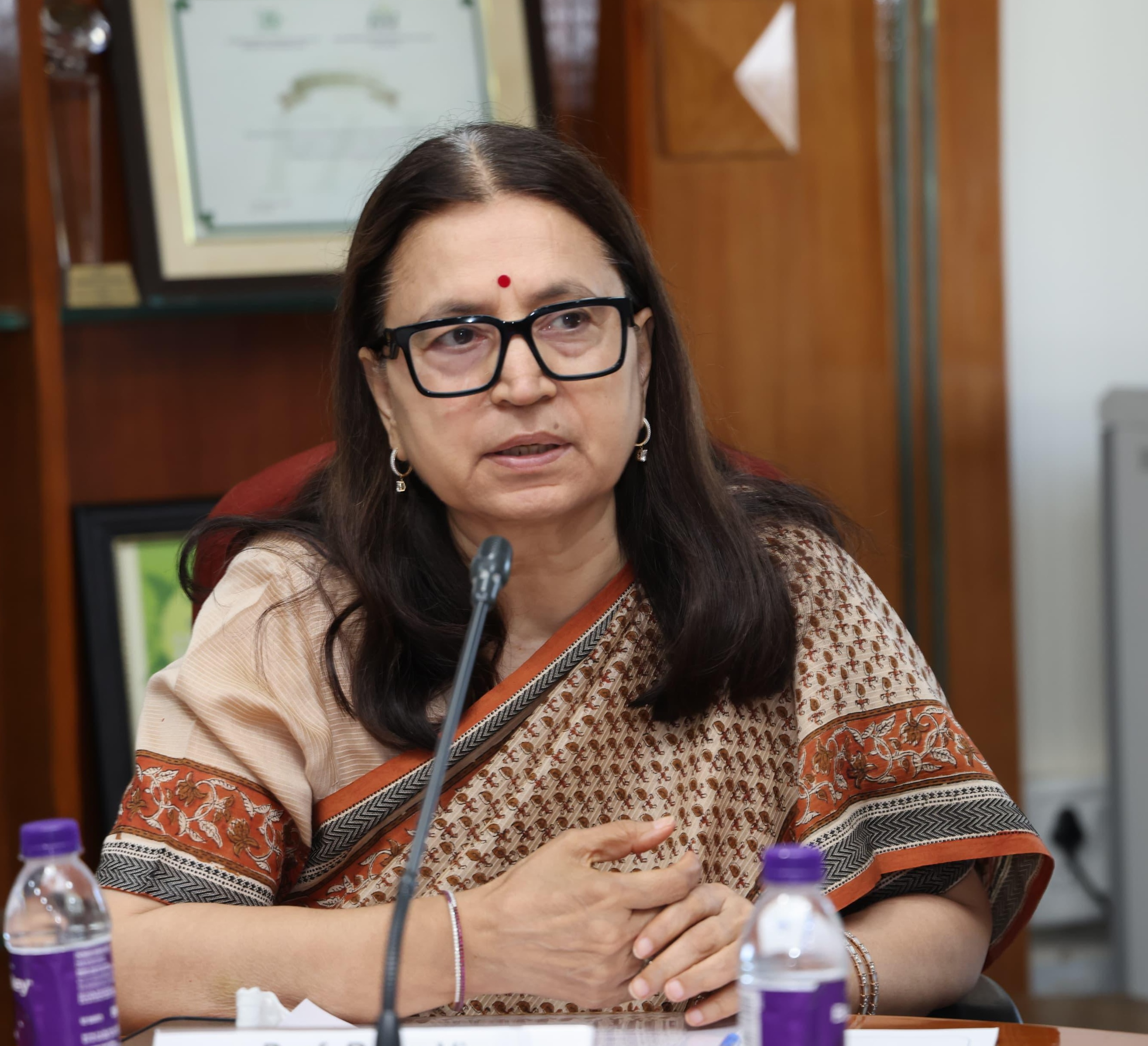
Renu Vig

Renu Cheema Vig is an Indian academic and professor, who served as the 14th vice-chancellor of Panjab University. She was the first woman vice-chancellor of Panjab University. With over 35 years of teaching, research, and administrative experience, she is known for her contributions to artificial intelligence, neural networks, fuzzy logic, and engineering education.

== Education ==
Renu Vig completed her B.E. from Punjab Engineering College in 1985, where she received a gold medal for securing the highest rank across departments. She earned her Ph.D. in 1997, specializing in Artificial Intelligence and Neural Networks. For her academic contributions, she was honoured with the N.K. Iyengar Memorial Prize (2003) for her paper on fuzzy modelling for ignition timing control, and the Corps of Engineers Prize (2005) for her work on a fuzzy diagnostic system for coronary artery disease. She was conferred the "Eminent Engineer Award" by the Institution of Engineers (India) in 2018.

== Career ==
Vig began her teaching career as a teaching assistant at Punjab Engineering College and later served as a lecturer there. She was an assistant professor at the Technical Teachers' Training Institute (now NITTTR) from 1997 to 2003. She joined the University Institute of Engineering and Technology (UIET), Panjab University, as reader in 2003 and became a professor in 2005.

She has guided 13 Ph.D. and 2 postdoctoral candidates and is currently supervising 3 Ph.D. students. Her research areas include fuzzy logic, signal processing, and AI applications in biomedical systems. She has authored over 120 Scopus-indexed publications, 40 SCI-indexed papers, and has an H-index of 19.

She has held several leadership roles at Panjab University, including:

- Vice Chancellor (Mar 2023 - July 2026)

- Dean of University Instruction (Feb 2022 – Mar 2023)

- Dean Research (Feb 2022)

- Director, UIET (2009 – 2018)

- Dean, Faculty of Engineering and Technology (multiple terms)
