= Lloyd Law College =

Private college in Nodia, India

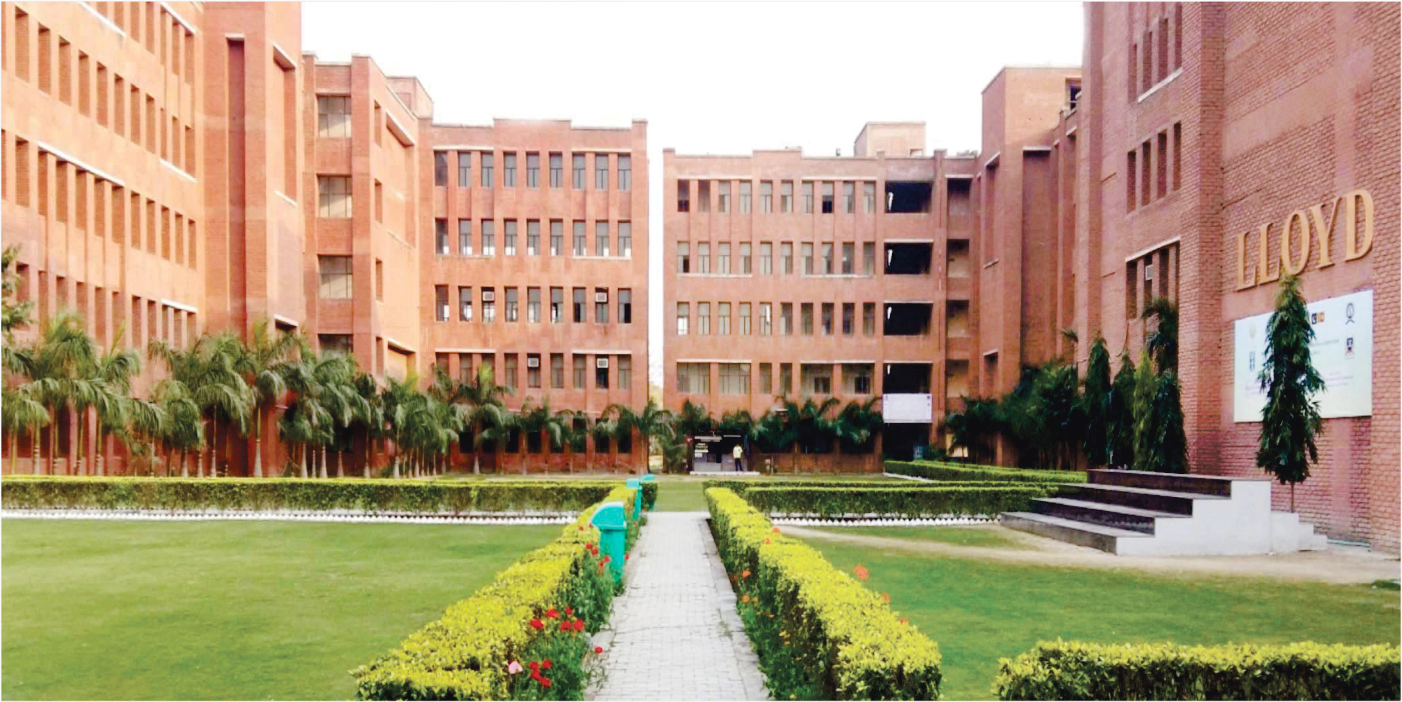
- Lloyd Law College campus
- Type: Law school, private university
- Established: 2003
- Founder: Manohar Thairani
- Accreditation: BCI
- Academic affiliations: Chaudhary Charan Singh University
- President: Manohar Thairani
- Director: Mohd Salim
- Location: Greater Noida, Uttar Pradesh, India; 28.4585°N 77.491°E
- Campus: 10 acres (4.0 ha); Urban
- Website: www.lloydlawcollege.edu.in

Lloyd Law College is a private law school in India located in Noida, Uttar Pradesh offering legal education since year 2003 in affiliation with CCS University, Meerut, U.P (state university established in 1965), and approved by the Bar Council of India (Statutory body of professional legal education in India).

== Academics ==
Lloyd Law College offers conjoined degree course of B.A. and LL.B. that combine law degrees with papers in liberal arts. It offers five years integrated course as B.A.LL.B and 3 years LL.B course with specialisation in different areas of law.

== Campus ==
Lloyd Law College is located in Knowledge Park - II, Greater Noida, Uttar Pradesh. The law college is spread over 4.5 acres of non-residential campus comprising three multi-storey blocks.

== Infrastructure ==
=== Library ===
The college has a Law Library. All class rooms are ICT equipped.

=== Moot Court Rooms ===
The college has two Moot Court halls with total seating capacity of 250.

=== Seminar Hall ===
The hall has a seating capacity of 300 and is used for events such as moot court, conferences, etc.

== Admissions ==
Students are admitted to the institute through a written common test, which is generally conducted in the month of May. Apart from the score in the LET a student must have passed the 10+2 or equivalent examination in any stream with at least 45% marks with English as a compulsory subject. The students after successfully clearing the respective law entrance exams have to give a personal interview after which the candidate is selected.

== Rankings ==
University rankings

Law – India
- Private colleges
- Outlook India (2022): 4

Lloyd Law College was Ranked fourth among private law colleges in India by Outlook India in 2022.
