= Abhipur =

- Town
- Location in Punjab, India
- Coordinates: 30.53°N 76.41°E
- Country: India
- State: Punjab
- District: Mohali

Languages
  - Official: Punjabi
- Time zone: UTC+5:30 (IST)
- PIN: 147001

Abhipur is a village and municipal council in Mohali district in state of Punjab, near Chandigarh. It is the location of Indo Global Colleges.
