= Khalsa College of Law =

Law college in Punjab, India

Khalsa College of Law (Amritsar)
- Other name: KCL
- Established: 2012
- Parent institution: Khalsa College Charitable Society of Amritsar
- Website: Official website

Khalsa College of Law or KCL is a private law school situated beside Ram Tirath Road in Amritsar in the Indian state of Punjab. It offers 5 year Integrated B.A. LL.B., B.Com LL.B. and 3 years law courses approved by Bar Council of India (BCI), New Delhi and affiliated to Guru Nanak Dev University.

== History ==
The college was established in 2012 and run by Khalsa College Charitable Society of Amritsar which was founded in 1892.
