= Sri Guru Granth Sahib World University =

Private university in Punjab, India

- Sri Guru Granth Sahib World University
- Type: Private
- Established: 2004
- Affiliations: UGC
- Chancellor: President of SGPC
- Vice-Chancellor: Dr. Prit Pal Singh
- Location: Fatehgarh Sahib, Punjab, India
- Campus: Urban
- Website: sggswu.edu.in

Sri Guru Granth Sahib World University is a private university in Fatehgarh Sahib, Punjab, India. It was established under Punjab State Act 20/2008 (Sri Guru Granth Sahib World University Act) and is recognized by UGC under section 2(f) of the UGC Act, 1956. Sardar Prakash Singh Badal (Chief Minister of Punjab) announced the setting up of Sri Guru Granth Sahib World University at Fatehgarh Sahib, the holy place of martyrs, on the occasion of the fourth centenary celebrations of the compilation and the first installation of Sri Adi (Guru) Granth Sahib in 2004.

== Academics ==
The academic year consists of two semesters with final examinations in the months of May and December. The curriculum is based on industry experience, collaborative research, and hands-on lab courses. An advisory committee of industrialists and chief operating officers provides insights for formulating the curriculum to make the students industry ready. Academicians from institutions including Massey University (New York), London School of Economics & Political Science, and University of Cambridge (UK) visit the campus to interact with the students as guest faculty on a regular basis.

With the mandate to focus on intensive study, research and training, major academic thrust areas are world religions, arts and humanities, social sciences, pure and applied sciences, engineering sciences, medical sciences, commerce & management and sports. To produce "global professionals", the university is also focusing on emerging technologies including biotechnology, nanotechnology, information technology, environmental science, and agriculture science.

The students are provided with opportunities for internships, community service, on-campus jobs, and research opportunities.

National and international conferences, faculty development programmes and workshops for students are organized on a regular basis where faculty and students participate from within and outside the country.

=== Publications ===
The university publishes three research journals in the fields of Sikh studies, religious studies and management.

1. Journal of Sri Guru Granth Sahib Studies
2. The Journal of Religion and Sikh Studies
3. University Journal of Management and Commerce (UJMC)

=== International MoUs ===
- University of Cambridge (UK)
- Xi’an Jiaotong University (China)
- Rovira i Virgili University (Spain)

=== Placements ===
The university has a dedicated Training and Placement Cell to collaborate industry and academia. To make the students industry-ready, regular training sessions are conducted which include the activities like GDs, role plays, mock interviews, reasoning tests, industrial visits, etc. Campus drives are held regularly and in the last years many companies like Axis Bank, Deutsche Bank, Tata Docomo, Mozilla, Accrete Globus Technology, Catalyst One, Impinge Solution, etc. have recruited our budding professionals to fill their needs.

=== Scholarships and aid schemes ===
The university provides scholarships for the needy and meritorious students. Ten percent needy and meritorious students in each course are provided tuition fee waiver and Sikh girl students from Kashmir are offered free education, meals and residence. The following scholarships are provided:

1. Sri Guru Granth Sahib Scholarship
2. SGPC-Cambridge Scholarship
3. SGPC Scholarship for Sikh Girls from Kashmir
4. OBC Scholarship
5. SC Scholarship

== Schools and programmes ==
=== School of Sri Guru Granth Sahib Studies ===
- M.A. Religious Studies
- M.A. Sikh Studies

=== School of Basic and Applied Sciences ===
- BSc Mathematics (Hons. School)
- MSc Mathematics (Hons. School)
- MSc Mathematics
- BSc Physics (Hons. School)
- MSc Physics (Hons. School)
- MSc Physics
- BSc Chemistry (Hons. School)
- MSc Chemistry (Hons. School)
- MSc Chemistry
- BSc Agriculture (Hons., 4 years)
- MSc Agriculture
- MSc Zoology
- MSc Botany
- MSc Environmental Science
- BCA
- MCA
- PGDCA

=== School of Engineering ===
- BTech Computer Science & Engg.
- MTech.Computer Science & Engg. (Integrated 5 yr.)
- MTech Computer Science & Engg.
- BTech.Mechanical Engg.
- MTech.Mechanical Engg. (Integrated 5 yr.)
- BTech Electronics & Communication Engg.
- MTech Electronics & Communication Engg. (Integrated, 5-year)
- MTech Electronics & Communication Engg.
- School of Commerce and Management
- B.Com. (Hons.)
- BBA
- MBA
- M.Com.

=== School of Economics ===
The head of the department is Dr. Sumit kumar. The university provides a balanced perspective—combining rigorous analytical tools with a focus on real-world economic challenges.

- B.A. Economics (Hons.)
- M.A. Economics

=== School of Languages & Literature ===
- M.A. English
- M.A. Punjabi

=== School of Performing Arts ===
- M.A. Music (Vocal)

=== School of Social Sciences ===
- Bachelor's in library and information science
- Master's in library and information science
- B.A. Social Sciences (Hons.)
- M.A. Political Science
- M.A. Psychology
- M.A. History
- M.A. Sociology

=== School of Education & Sports Technology ===
- B.P. Ed. (2 yr.)
- B.P.E.S. (3 yr.)

=== School of Emerging Technologies ===
- BTech Biotechnology
- MTech Biotechnology (Integrated 5 yr.)
- MTech Biotechnology (2 yr.)
- MSc Biotechnology (2 yr.)
- BTech Nanotechnology
- MTech.Nanotechnology (Integrated 5 yr.)
- MTech Nanotechnology (2 yr.)
- BTech Food Processing Tech.
- MTech Food Processing Tech. (Integrated 5 yr.)
- MSc Food Processing Technology (2 yr.)

=== School of Physiotherapy and Medical Sciences ===
- Bachelor of Physiotherapy (4 1/2 years)

== Research ==
The faculty conducts research activities. Many projects have been granted to the faculty by government bodies like DST and BRNS.

Students are provided with the opportunities of internships, community service, on-campus job avenues, and research opportunities. Many students are pursuing research in national and international academic institutions like University of Alabama (United States), Xi'an Jiaotong University (China), National Institute for Materials Science (Japan), DRDO, CSIO, IITs and BARC.

=== Research centres ===
- Guru Nanak Dev Centre for Sikh Music
- Guru Arjan Dev Centre for Guru Granth Sahib Studies
- Bhai Gurdas Centre for Sikh Studies

== Student life ==
Bhai Nand Lal Library is equipped with more than 25,000 books, 50 research journals, and a number of online journals. The university provides separate hostel facilities for boys and girls. University students participate in sports and cultural events at national and international levels. In past students have brought many laurels to the university through their participation in different sports events. 'Pargaas' is annual cultural event of the university in which students from around the country participate in academic and non-academic events.

=== Centre for Competitive Exams ===
To prepare the Punjabi youth for civil services and other competitive examinations, the university has set up the Bhai Kahn Singh Nabha Centre for Competitive Examinations.

=== Student Clubs ===
For the collaborative initiatives in extracurricular activities and overall personality development of students, following clubs have been formed:

- Bhagat Puran Singh Eco Club
- Genesis Business Club
- Narinder Singh Kapany Engineers Club
- Dr. Bhai Vir Singh Literary Club
- Amrita Shergill Photographic Club
- General Hari Singh Nalwa Mountaineering and Adventure Club
- University Sports Club
- Sobha Singh Fine Arts Club
- Mohinder Singh Randhawa Heritage Club
- Hargobind Khurana Science Club
- Nora Richards Theatre Club
- Ramanujan Maths Club
- Bhai Ghanaiya Social Welfare Club
