= Bhadson =

- Town
- Interactive map of Bhadson
- Coordinates: 30.5149600°N 76.246270°E
- Country: India
- State: Punjab
- District: Patiala
- Vidhan Sabha constituency: nabha

Population (2011)
  - Total: 7,260

Languages
  - Official: Punjabi
- Time zone: UTC+5:30 (IST)
- PIN: 147 202
- Telephone code: 01765
- Nearest city: Patiala

Bhadson is a town in Patiala district in the Indian state of Punjab.

== Geography ==
This town is situated on Amloh-Nabha road. Bhadson is at a distance of 12 km from Amloh, 20 km from Sirhind GT Road, 17 km from Nabha and 28 km from Patiala. Bhadson The postal head office is Bhadson.

== History ==
According to myth, the town was founded by Raja Bhadra Sain. He had a daughter named Kokila – who was fond of chess. She declared she would marry whoever could defeat her in chess. Raja Rasalu beat her and married her. In due course, Kokila fell in love with Raja Hodi. Rasalu learned about the love affair through his pet birds (Tota and Maina). Consequently, Raja Rasalu commanded her to remain within the palace. Raja Hodi got a tunnel constructed to meet her. One day when Raja Hodi came to meet Kokila, Raja Rasalu killed them.

Bhadson was conquered by Raja Hamir Singh of Nabha State in 1759. His successor, Raja Jaswant Singh built the fort of Bhadson on the ruins of the old fort, later occupied by the police station.

== Economy ==
Bhadson has a growing industry and technology sector. Sant and Kartar initiated harvester combine manufacturing, followed by other firms. Bhadson also makes wheat threshers, tractor combines, self-propelled combines with indigenous designs. Bhadson was rewarded as the cleanest city of north zone in 2018.

== Education ==
Bhadson has elementary, high and secondary schools with all the modern facilities like computer labs, science labs and vast play grounds. Secondary school at Bhadson is the major institute for students from near villages such as Jhambali Sani, Ramgarh, Nanowal, Chaswal, Sakrali etc
