= Guru Ravidas Ayurved University =

Public University in India

Coordinates: 31.5041753°N 76.0221099°E

- Type: Public
- Established: 2011
- Affiliations: UGC
- Chancellor: Governor of Punjab
- Vice-Chancellor: Bal Krishan Sharma Kaushik
- Location: Kharkan, Hoshiarpur, Punjab, India
- Campus: Rural
- Website: www.graupunjab.org

Guru Ravidas Ayurved University is a public university for Ayurveda, Yoga & Naturopathy, Unani, Siddha and Homeopathy (abbreviated as AYUSH) located in Hoshiarpur, Punjab, India. It has its jurisdiction over whole state of Punjab.

== Courses ==
- Doctor of Medicine (in Homeopathy)
- Doctor of Medicine (in Ayurveda)
- Bachelor of Ayurveda, Medicine and Surgery
- Bachelor in Homeopathic Medicine & Surgery
- Bachelor in Unani Medicine

== Affiliated colleges ==
=== Ayurvedic colleges ===
- Govt. Ayurvedic College, Lower Mall, Patiala
- Shri Lakshmi Narayan Ayurvedic College, O/S Lohgarh Gate, Amritsar
- Dayanand Ayurvedic College, Jalandhar
- Sri Satya Sai Murlidhar Ayurvedic College, Moga
- Mai Bhago Ayurvedic College (for Women), Shri Mukatsar Sahib
- Guru Nanak Ayurvedic Medical College, Shri Mukatsar Sahib
- Guru Nanak Ayurvedic Medical College & Research Institute, Gopalpur (Ludhiana)
- Shaheed Kartar Singh Sarabha Ayurvedic Medical College & Hospital, Sarabha
- Babe Ke Ayurvedic Medical College & Hospital, Dodhar (Moga)
- Smt Urmila Devi Ayurvedic College of Medical Sciences & Hospital, Hoshiarpur
- Saint Sahara Ayurvedic Medical College & Hospital, Kot Shameer (Bathinda)
- Shri Dhanwantry Ayurvedic College& Dabur Dhanwantry Hospital, Sector 46-B, Chandigarh
- Shiv Shakti Ayurvedic College & Hospital, Sunam Road, Bhikhi (Mansa)
- Harmony Ayurvedic College, Ferozpur
- Sarswati Ayurvedic Medical College, Gharuan (Kharar)
- Baba Hira Das Ji Ayurvedic Medical College & Hospital, V.P.O. Badal
- Khalsa Ayurvedic Medical College And Hospital, Nangal Kalan,(Mansa)

=== Homeopathic colleges ===
- Homeopathic Medical College, Abohar
- Sri Guru Nanak Dev Homeopathic Medical College, Ludhiana
- Lord Mahavira Homeopathic Medical College, Ludhiana
- Kalyan Homeopathic Medical College & Hospital, Taran Taran

=== Unani Colleges ===
- Rehbar Ayurvedic & Unani Tibbi Medical College, Hospital and Research Centre, Bhawanigarh (Sangrur)
