= Guru Kashi University =

Private university in Punjab, India

- Type: Private
- Established: 2011
- Affiliations: UGC
- Chancellor: S. Gurlabh Singh Sidhu
- Vice-Chancellor: Dr. Rameshwar Singh
- Location: Talwandi Sabo, Punjab, India; 29.9606297°N 75.1248143°E
- Campus: 100 acres
- Website: www.gku.ac.in

Guru Kashi University (GKU) has been established by the Act of the Legislature of the state of Punjab, under the "Guru Kashi University Act 2011" (Punjab Act No. 37 of 2011). It is a private university in Talwandi Sabo, Punjab, comprising separate hostels for boys and girls. The university houses 7000+ students and provides education through a variety of disciplines across doctorate, postgraduate, graduate, and diploma programmes.

== History ==
The origins of Guru Kashi University are linked to the establishment of former educational institutions in Talwandi Sabo, Punjab. In 1998, Guru Gobind Singh Polytechnic College was formally established. Initially, the institution offered only diploma-level programmes, which were later expanded with undergraduate and postgraduate programmes.

In 2001, the Guru Gobind Singh College of Engineering and Technology was established, broadening the range of technical and professional education in the region. This development was followed by the foundation stone for the Guru Gobind Singh College of Education in 2005, marking the institution's entry into teacher education.

Further proliferation occurred in 2006 when the GGS Institute of Information Technology & Research and the GGS College of Nursing were formally established. In 2009, additional educational initiatives were introduced, encompassing the GGS College of Nursing and the GGS Collegiate Public School.

The formal consolidation occurred in 2011 with the establishment of Guru Kashi University, which was inaugurated under Punjab Act No. 37 of 2011, granting it the status of a state private university.

== Campus & Infrastructure ==
Guru Kashi University comprises a campus spreading over more than 100 acres. The campus is located approximately 33 kilometres from Bathinda and serves as the primary site for the majority of the university's academic and residential activities.

The university campus includes multiple academic and support facilities designed to meet institutional and student needs. These facilities comprise sports grounds, a basketball court, a gymnasium, an auditorium, canteens, and open learning centres. The campus also features agricultural farms, orchards, herbal gardens, and landscaped parks, which are utilised for academic, research, and environmental purposes. Additional infrastructure includes an open-air theatre and computing facilities.

The university library serves as a central academic resource and houses collections related to engineering, science, technology, management, and other disciplines offered by the institution. The library supports teaching, learning, and research activities through various print and digital resource access.

== Administration ==
The administration of the university is governed by statutory bodies responsible for academic oversight and institutional governance. The principal authorities of the university comprise the Board of Management and the Academic Council. The Board of Management serves as the highest governing body of the university and is responsible for policy formulation, strategic planning, and overall administrative supervision.

The Academic Council functions as the highest academic authority of the university. It is responsible for maintaining academic standards and overseeing matters related to instruction, education, curriculum development, research, and examinations in accordance with the university's statutes and regulations.

As of the 2026 administration, S. Gurlabh Singh Sidhu serves as the Chancellor of the university. The executive and academic leadership is headed by the Vice-Chancellor, Dr. Rameshwar Singh, who is responsible for the day-to-day academic and administrative functioning of the institution. S. Sukhraj Singh Sidhu serves as the Managing Director of Guru Kashi University, contributing to the strategic and managerial oversight of the institution.

Er. Sukhwinder Singh Sidhu holds the position of General Secretary and is involved in the administrative and organisational affairs of the university. The roles of Pro Vice-Chancellor and Registrar are held by Prof. (Dr.) J. S. Dhiman, who oversees academic coordination, regulatory compliance, and administrative operations related to academic governance.

== Academics ==
Guru Kashi University offers a range of academic programmes across multiple levels of higher education, including undergraduate, postgraduate, doctoral, and diploma courses. These faculties and departments periodically conduct academic activities across different areas of study.

The university's academic structure includes faculties such as Engineering and Technology, Visual and Performing Arts, Sciences, Humanities and Language, Agriculture, Health and Allied Sciences, Management and Commerce, Computing, as well as specialised schools such as the University School of Law and departments for physical education and professional sciences. Programmes in engineering and technology cover traditional and applied fields, with undergraduate and postgraduate degrees in disciplines including civil, mechanical, electrical, computer science, and petroleum engineering.

Academic offerings in the arts and social sciences comprise postgraduate degrees in subjects such as economics, history, English, and sociology, alongside commerce and management programmes like the Bachelor of Commerce and the Master of Commerce. The Faculty of Computing provides courses in areas related to computer applications and information technology, and supports research and skill development in computing disciplines.

Health and Allied Sciences programmes pertain to areas such as paramedical sciences and physiotherapy, while the Faculty of Agriculture focuses on agricultural education and related research. Legal studies are offered through the Faculty of Law, which encompasses programmes in legal principles and related fields.

The university also provides online and flexible learning options that include vocational courses and professional diplomas across various disciplines, facilitating distinctive modes of study. Academic governance and curriculum development are supported by statutory bodies within the university, and programmes are structured to comply with national higher education standards and regulatory requirements.

== International Community ==
Guru Kashi University enrolls students from distinct regions, including international applicants, across its academic programmes. The university offers more than 190 academic courses at the diploma, undergraduate, postgraduate, and doctoral levels. These programmes span multiple disciplines and are delivered through the university's constituent schools and departments. Admissions are open to international students subject to meeting the prescribed academic and eligibility criteria.

Academic offerings for international students follow the same curriculum structure, academic regulations, and assessment standards as those applicable to domestic students. Instruction, evaluation methods, and grading systems are uniformly applied to ensure academic consistency. Moreover, international students are required to meet the same progression and completion requirements as other enrolled students.

The university facilitates admissions for international students in accordance with applicable regulatory guidelines and institutional policies. The admission process includes verification of academic credentials and compliance with relevant visa and immigration requirements. International support is provided through designated administrative units to assist with procedural formalities related to enrollment.

== Professional affiliations ==
He has been actively participating in various professional and civic initiatives, including:

- Member, Federation of Indian Chambers of Commerce & Industry (FICCI)
- Member, World Punjabi Centre (WPC), Canada
- Secretary, Farmers Welfare Association (FWA), Mohali
- Advisory Board Member, Green ThinkerZ, Punjab

== Awards & Rankings ==
Guru Kashi University has received numerous awards and recognitions from multiple national and international bodies for its contributions to higher education, research, agriculture, innovation, infrastructure, and sustainability. These recognitions span areas such as agricultural sciences, digital innovation, research and development, campus sustainability, international collaboration, and skill development.

In 2021, the university was conferred the Sir C. V. Raman Research Excellence Award for its work in research and development, and the National Technology & Digital Innovation Award for initiatives related to technological and digital innovation. Earlier recognitions include the Dr. K. L. Chadha Award (2020) for agriculture diversification, the Dr. Norman Borlaug Award (2020) for agricultural research, and the Dr. M. S. Kang Award (2020) for contributions to sustainable agriculture.

The university has also been acknowledged for its focus on environmental sustainability and campus development, receiving the Green & Clean Campus Award in 2019. In the same year, it was awarded the International Best University Award for innovative practices, along with agriculture-focused recognitions such as the Dr. Rattan Lal Agri Excellence Award for agriculture diversification and the Dr. M. S. Swaminathan Research Excellence Award for agricultural sciences.

In 2018, Guru Kashi University received multiple awards, including the Dr. Gurdev Singh Khush Excellence Award for food security, the International Knowledge Exchange Initiative Award for international collaborations, and the All India Best Infrastructure University Award for education environment and infrastructure. It was also recognised with the Indo Asian Outstanding University Award for placements and the International Education Excellence Award for higher education and research.

Earlier, in 2017, the university was recognised as the National Best Rural University in India for its role in higher education, and received the International Best University Award for its efforts in skill development.

== Recognitions ==
Guru Kashi University (GKU) is a NAAC A++ accredited university, approved by the University Grants Commission (UGC) under section 2(f) of the UGC Act, 1956. It is recognised by the Government of Punjab and the Association of Indian Universities (AIU) and approved by statutory bodies, including the Bar Council of India (BCI), the National Council for Teacher Education (NCTE), and the Pharmacy Council of India (PCI). The university also holds accreditation from the Indian Council of Agricultural Research (ICAR) for its B.Sc. Agriculture (Hons.) programme.

In addition, Guru Kashi University is supported by professional memberships and collaborations, including recognition from the Indian Society for Technical Education (ISTE). The university has signed numerous MoUs with institutions such as Braask Education Private Limited, TASA Global, National Seeds Corporation Ltd, Crandall University (Canada), Vivekanand Global University, University of Limpopo, KGIC, and ISEG.

== Notable alumni ==
The university has a global alumni network of over 30,000 student alumni who have made contributions in a variety of fields and industries.

- Parminder Singh Dhindsa – Politician and Former Finance Minister of Punjab
- Gurinder Sehmbey – CEO, StarAgri Finance Ltd.
- Manjit Singh – Former State Head (Haryana), Jio
- Rinku Sharma – Pro Kabaddi Player
- Mr. Tanishq – International Archer
- Paras Kalra – CEO, BlueLight Media
- Dr. Surbhi Jhosi – Principal, The Millennium School
- Aditya Solanki – International Judoka Player

== Cultural & academic initiatives ==
In 2025, GKU launched the Sufi and Folk Music Heritage Chair to preserve the music traditions of Punjab. S. Gurlabh Singh Sidhu served as the chief patron of this initiative, led by the popular singer and Padma Shri Award recipient, Hans Raj Hans.
