= Dayanand Medical College & Hospital =

Private Medical School in Ludhiana, Punjab, India

- Motto: सर्वे सन्तु निरामयाः
- Type: Private Medical School
- Established: 1964
- Academic affiliations: Baba Farid University of Health Sciences; National Medical Commission
- Principal: Dr. Gurpreet Singh Wander
- Faculty: 182
- Students: 768
- Undergraduates: 470
- Postgraduates: 213
- Doctoral students: 85
- Location: Ludhiana, Punjab, India; 30°54′56″N 75°49′23″E
- Campus: Urban
- Website: www.dmch.edu

Dayanand Medical College is a private medical college and hospital located in Ludhiana, Punjab, India. The medical college is affiliated to Baba Farid University of Health Sciences.

== History ==
Dr. Banarsi Dass Soni, former Captain in the Indian Military Service, conceived the idea in 1934 and started Arya Medical School in a rented building in Civil Lines, Ludhiana. In 1936, the management of the school was handed over to the Arya Samaj, Saban Bazar, Ludhiana, under the aegis of Arya Pratinidhi Sabha, Punjab.

In 1964 the Arya Medical School became a full-fledged MBBS College, which came to be known as Dayanand Medical College & Hospital (DMCH). The management was taken over by Managing Society of Dayanand Medical College & Hospital, Ludhiana, and industrialist Shri H. R. Dhanda became its founder president.

DMCH was the first hospital in Punjab to set up a dialysis unit in the nephrology service in 1980.

== NMC recognition ==
The institution is accredited by the National Medical Commission for the MBBS course as well as several specialty and super-specialty courses.

The college is affiliated to the Baba Farid University of Health Sciences, Faridkot, Punjab.

== Courses offered ==
The school offers MBBS, MD/MS postgraduate, PG diploma courses and super-specialties.

The DMCH College of Nursing operates there.

== Hero DMC Heart Institute ==
Since 1 April 2001, the Hero DMC Heart Institute (HDHI) has provided care to patients with heart and blood vessel disease.

== Ranking ==
University and college rankings

Medical – India
- NIRF (2024): 40

The National Institutional Ranking Framework ranked the institute 40 in the medical category in 2024.
