= CT University =

Private university in Ludhiana, Punjab

- Type: Private University
- Established: 2016
- Accreditation: UGC
- Chairman: S. Charanjit Singh Channi
- Vice-Chancellor: Dr. Nitin Tandon
- Location: Ludhiana, Punjab, India; 30°49′14.40″N 75°33′10.57″E
- Campus: Urban
- Website: ctuniversity.in

CT University (CTU) is a private university on Ferozepur Road, Ludhiana, Punjab, India.It was established in 2016 under C.T. University Act, 2016 (Punjab Act No. 50 of 2016). The university is approved by University Grants Commission.

CTU offers a full range of academic programs at the undergraduate, postgraduate and doctoral level.

== CT Group ==
CT Group is a result the establishment of the CT Educational Society in 1997. CT Group is an academic conglomerate comprising multiple educational entities, including CT University, CT Institutions and two schools.

The group offering programmes in disciplines including Engineering, Pharmaceutical Sciences, Architecture & Design, Hotel Management & Airline Tourism, Sciences, Arts, Commerce, Education via its educational entities of Higher education viz CTU and CT Institutions, Jalandhar (16 Professional Institutes affiliated with government universities on two campuses).

The group has over 10,000 full time enrolled students from various states of India and around 15 other countries. The setting offers a multiethnic culture. The group has certifications by apex bodies such as ISO and NAAC and has received accolades from organizations such as IBM, Brands Impact, and Higher Education Forum.

== Academics ==
The University Includes:

- School of Engineering and Technology
- School of Management Studies
- School of Humanities and Physical Education
- School of Pharmaceutical and Healthcare Science
- School of Design and Innovation
- School of Agriculture and Natural Science
- School of Law
- School of Hotel Management Airlines and Tourism

== Campus ==
The campus of CT University occupies 36 acres.
