= Indo Global Colleges =

- IGEF Logo
- Motto in English: Education alone can give one a life with values
- Type: Private
- Established: 2003
- Affiliations: Punjab Technical University
- Location: Abhipur, Punjab, India; 30°53′06″N 76°41′30″E
- Campus: Rural
- Website: www.igef.net

The Indo Global Colleges are a group of private, self-financed institutes located in Abhipur, Punjab, India. The colleges were established in 2003 by the Indo Global Education Foundation (IGEF) and are affiliated to Punjab Technical University (PTU), offering various courses in engineering, architecture and management at bachelor and master levels.

== Campus ==
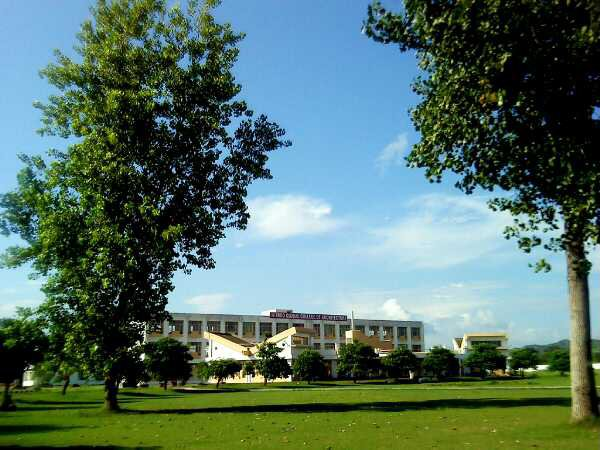
Indo Global College of Architecture

The Indo Global Colleges are located at Indo Global Education City, extending over an area of 70 acres (0.28 km^{2}) in the village Abhipur of the Mohali district of Punjab.

The campus contains campuses for each college. There is also an IBM Center of Excellence at the Engineering campus.

== Academics ==
The Indo Global Colleges currently consist of four colleges. The college of engineering offers four-year Bachelor of Technology (B.Tech.), and two-year Master of Technology (M.Tech.) degrees in various engineering fields. The college of architecture offers a five-year program awarding Bachelor of Architecture (B.Arch.), the college of education offers a one-year Bachelor of Education (B.Ed.) programme. The college of management offers a two-year Master of Business Administration (MBA). All the colleges are affiliated to Punjab Technical University and the programmes are approved by the All India Council for Technical Education.

== Events and functions ==
IGEF has organized various events and functions to promote student culture in the institute. "Lamhe" is Indo Global Colleges annual fest being organized every year regarding freshers who joined college in respected year. It has been organized every year since 2003. "Leap" is a placement drive organized in 2010.
