= Baba Farid University of Health Sciences =

State university in Punjab, India

Coordinates: 30.6837°N 74.7348°E

- Type: Public
- Established: July 1998; 28 years ago
- Affiliations: UGC, AIU, ACU
- Chancellor: Governor of Punjab
- Vice-Chancellor: Dr. Rajinder Kumar Bansal
- Location: Faridkot, Punjab, India
- Campus: Urban
- Website: bfuhs.ggsmch.org

Baba Farid University of Health Sciences (BFUHS) is a public university established in July 1998 under the Punjab Act No. 18, located in Faridkot.

== Affiliated Institutes ==
University has about 920 MBBS and 1,070 BDS seats across Punjab. Notable affiliated colleges include

=== Faculty of Medical Sciences ===
- Christian Medical College, Ludhiana
- Dayanand Medical College & Hospital, Ludhiana
- ESIC Medical College and Hospital, Ludhiana
- Government Medical College, Patiala
- Government Medical College, Amritsar
- Guru Gobind Singh Medical College, Faridkot
- Dr. B.R. Ambedkar State Institute of Medical Sciences, Mohali
- Punjab Institute of Medical Sciences, Jalandhar
- Gian Sagar Medical College, Banur

=== Faculty of Dental Sciences ===
- Baba Jaswant Singh Dental College, Ludhiana
- National Dental College, Patiala
- Sri Sukhmani Dental College and Hospital, Dera Bassi

Genesis institute of dental Sciences and research, ferozepur

=== Faculty of Nursing Sciences ===
- University College Of Nursing, Faridkot
- Malwa College of Nursing, Kotkapura Faridkot
- Silver Oaks College of Nursing, Abhipur, Mohali

=== Faculty of Physiotherapy ===
- Saraswati College of Physiotherapy, Mohali

=== Faculty of Pharmaceutical Sciences ===
- University Institute of Pharmaceutical Sciences and Research, Faridkot
