= Guru Nanak Dev University =

Public university in Amritsar, India

- Motto: ਗੁਰ ਗਿਆਨ ਦੀਪਕ ਉਜਿਆਰੀਆ (Punjabi)
- Motto in English: The Lamp of the Guru's Wisdom Illuminates
- Type: Public state university
- Established: 24 November 1969; 56 years ago
- Accreditation: NAAC A++
- Affiliations: UGC, PCI, BCI, COA, NCTE
- Chancellor: Governor of Punjab
- Vice-Chancellor: Karamjeet Singh
- Undergraduates: 5741 (2023)
- Postgraduates: 5579 (2023)
- Doctoral students: 1030 (2023)
- Location: Amritsar, Punjab, India; 31°37′45″N 74°49′36″E
- Campus: 500 acres (200 ha); Urban
- Website: gndu.ac.in

Guru Nanak Dev University (Punjabi: ਗੁਰੂ ਨਾਨਕ ਦੇਵ ਯੂਨੀਵਰਸਿਟੀ) is a Public State University in Amritsar, Punjab, India. The university's campus is spread over 500 acres (200 ha). Established in 24 November 1969, and is named after the first Sikh Guru, Guru Nanak Dev. The university is home to several research centers and institutes, including the National Institute of Punjabi Language, Literature and Culture, the Indian Institute of Tourism and Travel Management, and the Indian Institute of Public Administration.

== Campus ==
The university campus is spread over 500 acres (200 ha), approximately 8 km (5.0 mi) west of Amritsar on the Grand Trunk Road, next to Khalsa College.

== Ranking ==
University rankings

General – India
- NIRF (Overall) (2021): 85
- NIRF (Overall) (2022): 80
- NIRF (Overall) (2023): 87

Guru Nanak Dev University was ranked 48th among universities in India by the National Institutional Ranking Framework (NIRF) in 2023 and 87th overall.

== Vice Chancellors ==
- Bishan Singh Samundri (1969–1978)
- Karam Singh Gill (1978–1981)
- J. S. Grewal (1981–1984)
- S. S. Bal (1985–1988)
- Gurdip Singh Randhawa (1989–1996)
- Harbhajan Singh Soch (1996–2001)
- S. P. Singh (2001 to 2006)
- Jai Rup Singh Pannu (2006–2009)
- Ajaib Singh Brar (2009–2017)
- Jaspal Singh Sandhu (2017–2024)
- Karamjeet Singh (2024–present)

== Gallery ==
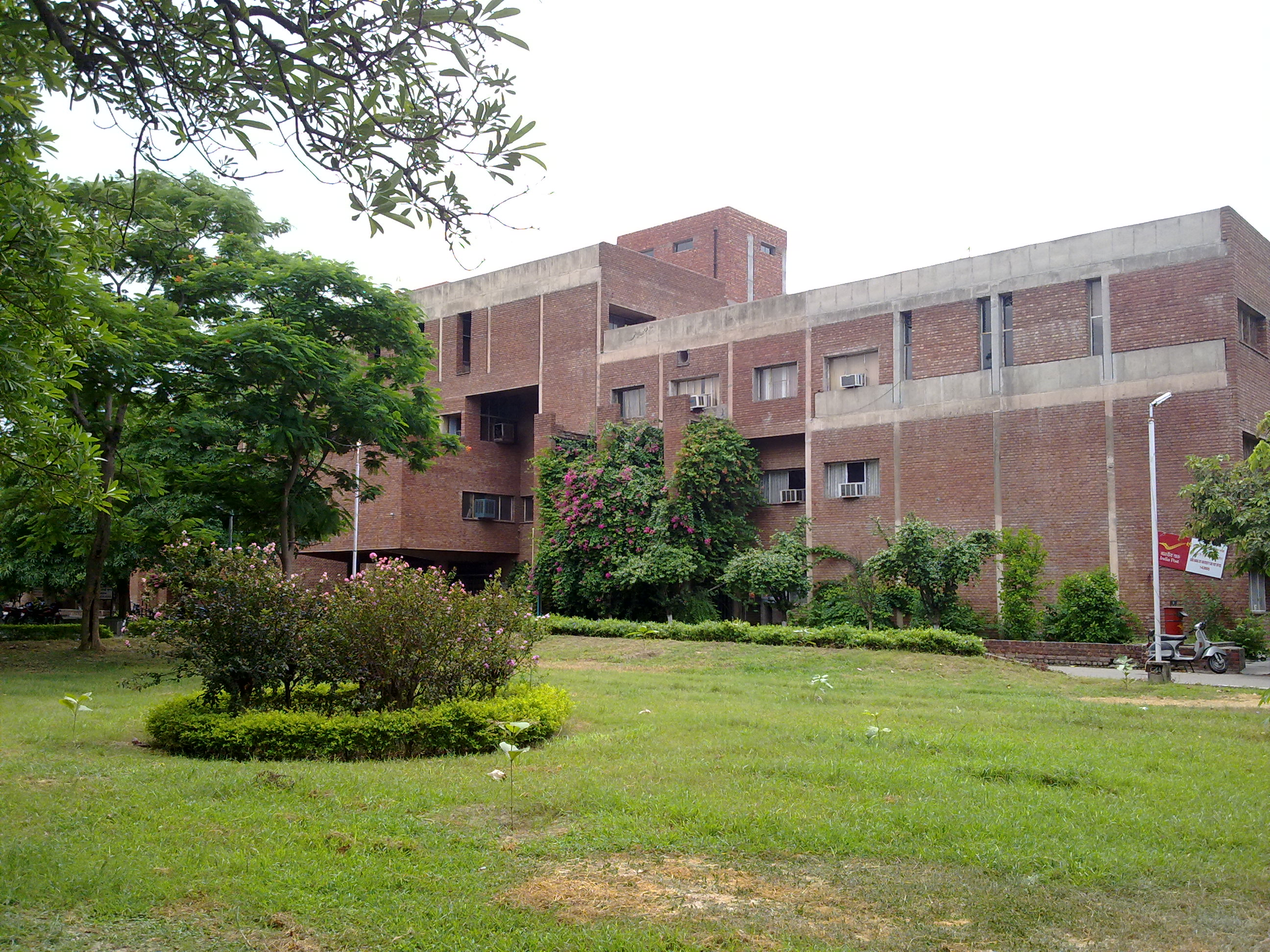
Administration block and post office

Main entrance

Main entrance gate

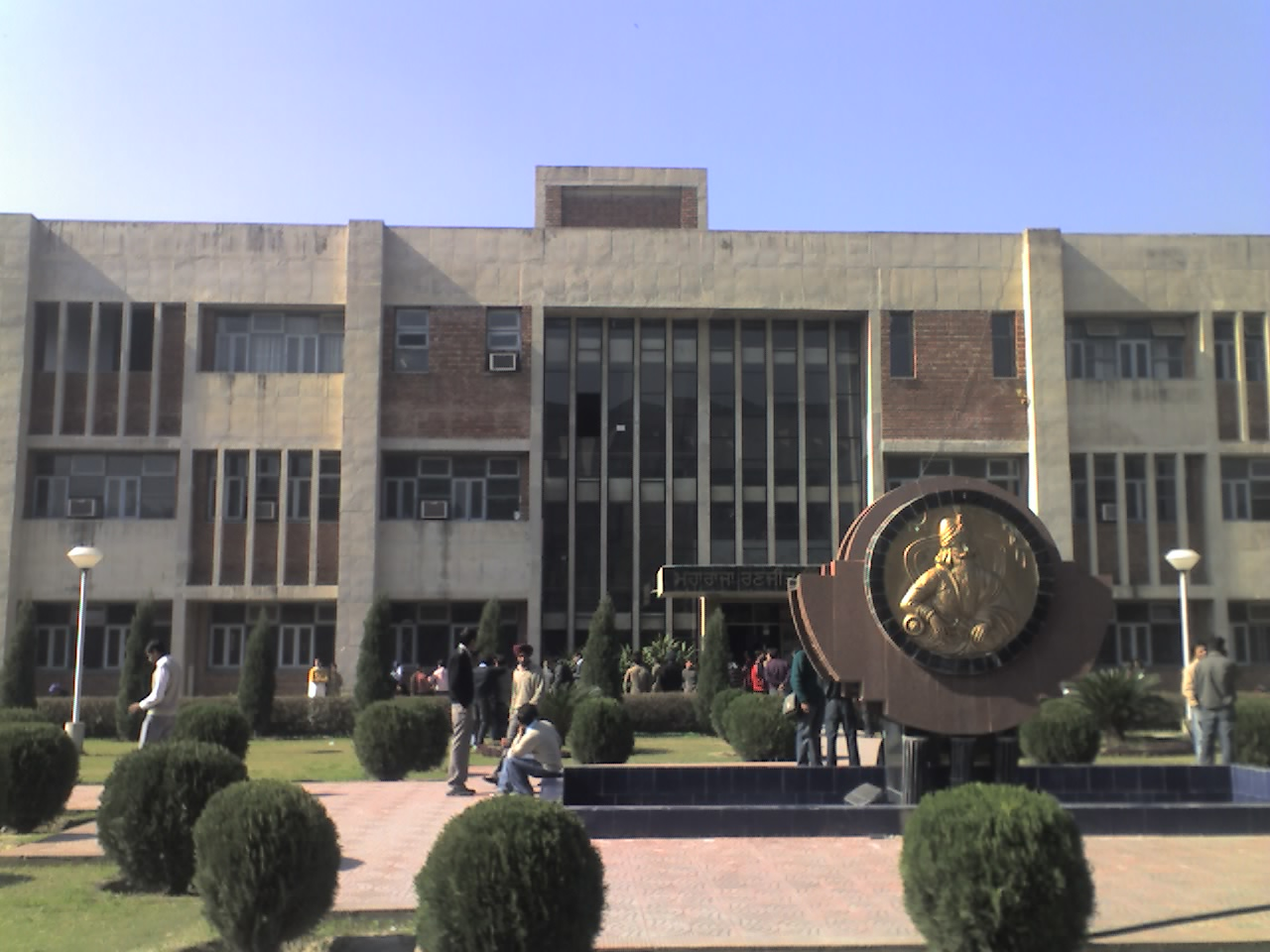
Maharaja Ranjit Singh Bhawan

== Notable alumni ==
Some of Guru Nanak Dev University's notable alumni include:

- Ajit Pal Singh, Indian hockey Olympian and both Padma Shri and Arjuna Awardee
- Amrinder Gill, singer and actor
- Ashok Kumar Mittal, Member of Rajya Sabha and Chancellor of Lovely Professional University.
- Bhura Singh Ghuman, former Vice Chancellor, Punjabi University, Patiala
- Gurpreet Ghuggi, comedian and actor
- Gursharan Singh (1929 – 2011), theatre director and playwright
- Kapil Sharma, comedian, actor, singer
- Ranjit Bawa, singer and actor
- Sanjeev Kumar Yadav, Deputy Commissioner of Police
- Satinder Satti, anchor and actress
- Sidhu Moosewala, singer and actor
- Sugandha Mishra, singer and actress
- Surjit Patar, Punjabi writer and poet (currently President of Punjab Arts Council, Chandigarh and Padma Shri Awardee)

Prof. (Dr.) Hardeep Singh with Dr. Kuldeep Singh (Associate Professor), Dr. Rajandeep Singh (Assistant Professor), Dr. Rajdeep Singh (Assistant Professor), Event Coordinator Dr. Satinder Kaur (Assistant Professor), and Dr. Gurpreet Singh (Assistant Professor),

Members of the CosmoGen Students Society with founder Krishna Prashar, co-founders Abhivansh Sharma and Namya Dutta, and chief guests Zeeshan Ali Sayeed, Vanshika Pandey, and Naman Vidyabhanu during CosmoHacks'25 at Guru Nanak Dev University, Amritsar.

== University Societies & Events ==
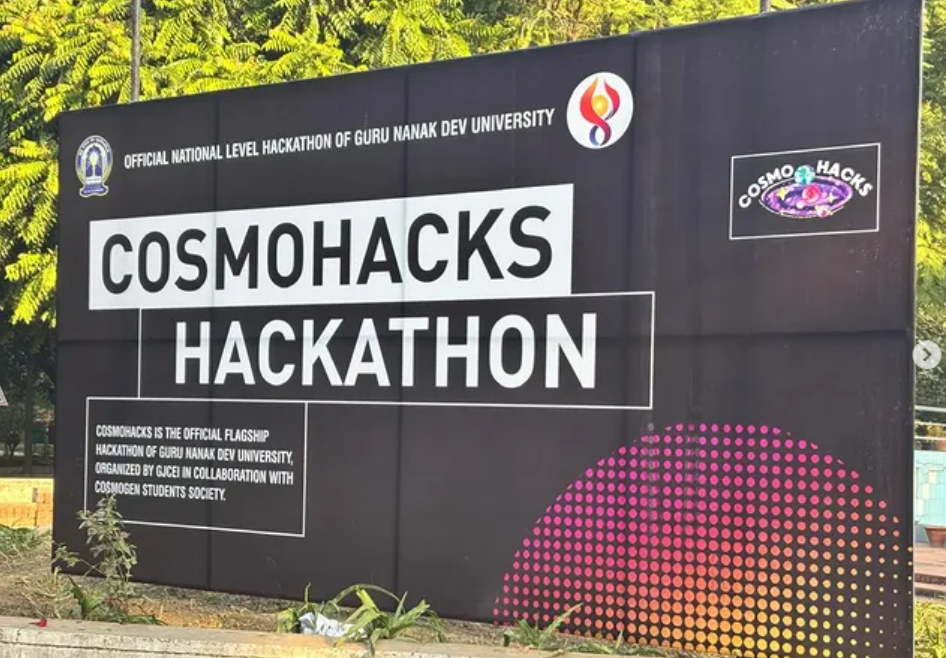
Official banner of CosmoHacks, a student hackathon organized at Guru Nanak Dev University by the CosmoGen Students Society.

The university has hosted student-led technical events and hackathons, including CosmoHacks'25, the first national-level hackathon organized at Guru Nanak Dev University, which was organized by the CosmoGen Students Society.[22] One of the student initiatives is the CosmoGen Students Society, which organizes STEM-related activities and events for students.[23][24] One of the student initiatives is the CosmoGen Students Society, which organizes STEM-related activities and events for students.

== See also ==
- Indian Institute of Management, Amritsar
- List of places named after Guru Nanak Dev
