= Shanaleshwara Swayambhu Temple =

Hindu Temple in Rajpura, Patiala district, Punjab, India

- श्री शानालेश्वर स्वयंभू मन्दिर
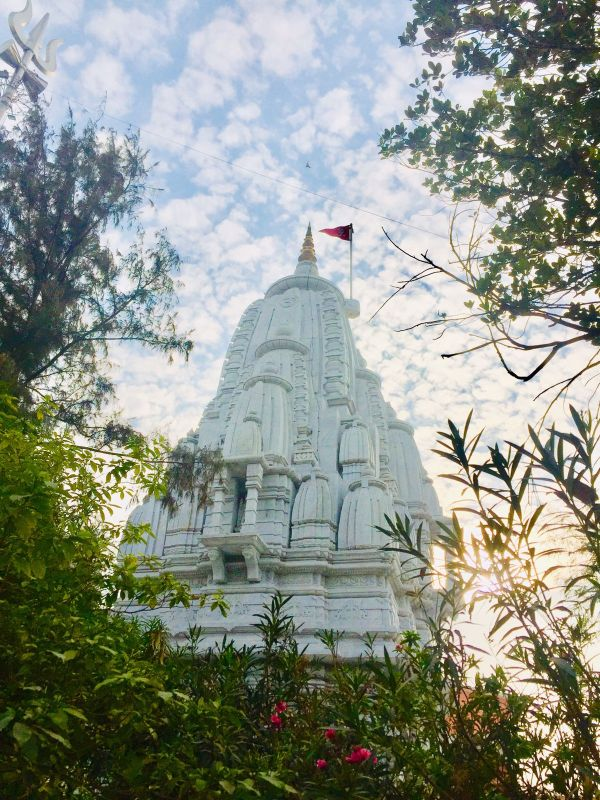
- Shanaleshwara Swayambhu Temple, Nalas

- Location within India

Religion
- Affiliation: Hinduism
- District: Patiala
- Deity: Lord Shiva
- Festivals: Maha Shivaratri, Guru Purnima and also MahaRudra Yajna
- Features: Temple tree: Banyan

Location
- Location: Rajpura
- State: Punjab
- Country: India
- Coordinates: 30°32′16.08″N 76°34′51.96″E

Website
- www.shanaleshwara.in

Shanaleshwara Swayambhu Temple (Sanskrit: श्री शानालेश्वर स्वयंभू मन्दिर) dedicated to the worship of Lord Shiva. "Shanaleshwara" means, the sign that is worshiped as Lord Shiva. It is situated at 7 Kilometre away in the Nalas village of Rajpura, Punjab. It is maintained by the ascetic sadhu's of Juna Akhara Foundation.

== Temple ==
=== Swayambhu ===
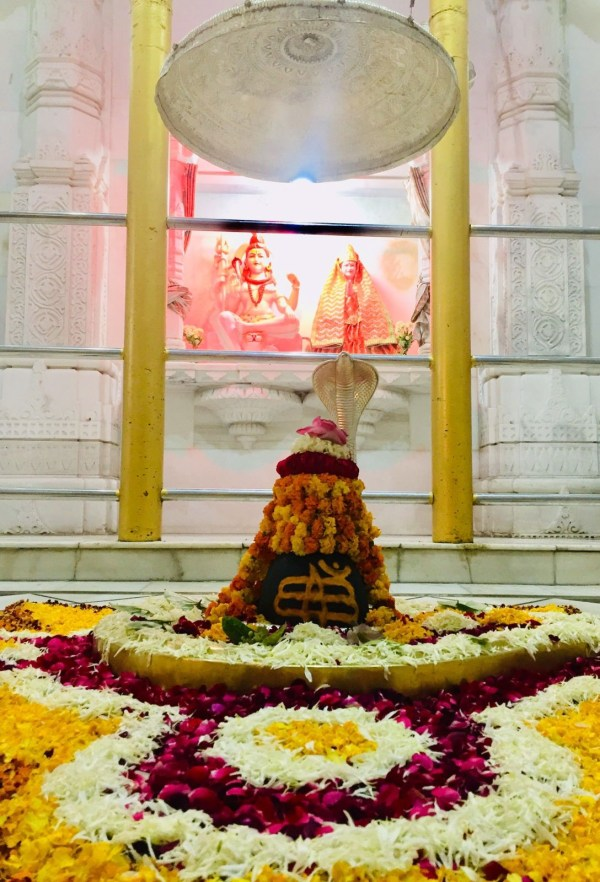
Inside the Temple a view of Shanaleshwara Swayambhu lingam 'decorated for evening worship'

Inside the Shanaleshwara Temple is the Swayambhu lingam of Lord Shiva. Shiva in the lingam form is believed to be Swayambhu. Swayambhu lingams are Self-created or natural lingams, discovered in the place where they now stand. Most of these are oval- shaped stones. These lingams do not need a prana pratishtha, because a Swayambhu lingam already inherently embodies the power of Shiva.

=== Importance ===
Maha Shivaratri is great festival here, three-days fair is held here every year on Maha Shivaratri and lakhs of people come to the fair to ask for a vow. It has been a tradition that on Maha Shivaratri and in this area (near Rajpura) most of the devotees start their journey on foot from their homes to the Shanaleshwara temple and volunteers serve food to the devotees along the way.

In 1592, Maharaja of Patiala built this temple. Since the 15th century temple has been home to Sadhu's. The Lingam of Shanaleshwara is also known to be Pancha Bhoota. The temple of Shanaleshwara is a place of Guru–shishya tradition.

=== Timing ===
Each row displays several details. Some are there by default, others can be added. These are the available Timings (GMT+5:30):

In the daytime or nighttime
| 04:00 | to | 11:45 | Morning | | |
| Evening | | 14:30 | to | 20:00 | Winter's |
| Evening | | 14:30 | to | 20:30 | Summer's |
| Evening | | 14:30 | to | 21:00 | Winter on Monday |
| Evening | | 14:30 | to | 21:30 | Summer on Monday |
| 04:00 | to | 23:45 | on Trayodashi | | |

== History ==
According to the legend, a cow always showered own milk on the lingam. Nalas region was in jungle, at that time cowherds used to came to feed their cattle's.

A cowherd (Gujjar) noticed that one of his cows would regularly stand over a specific bush in the forest and shed her milk voluntarily. Curious and somewhat frustrated, the owner began digging at that spot with an axe. As the axe struck a stone buried in the ground, blood began to flow from it. A sage named Swami Karam Giri, who was meditating nearby, realized the divine nature of the stone. It was discovered to be a Swayambhu (self-manifested) Shivling. To this day, the Shivling is said to bear the mark of the axe strike. Legend says his elephant stopped exactly at the spot where the Shivling was found and refused to move. Recognizing the divine sign, the Maharaja commissioned the construction of the temple in approximately 1592 AD.

== Access ==
=== Road ===
From Rajpura to nalas village travelers can reach this destination by private vehicles.

== Gallery ==
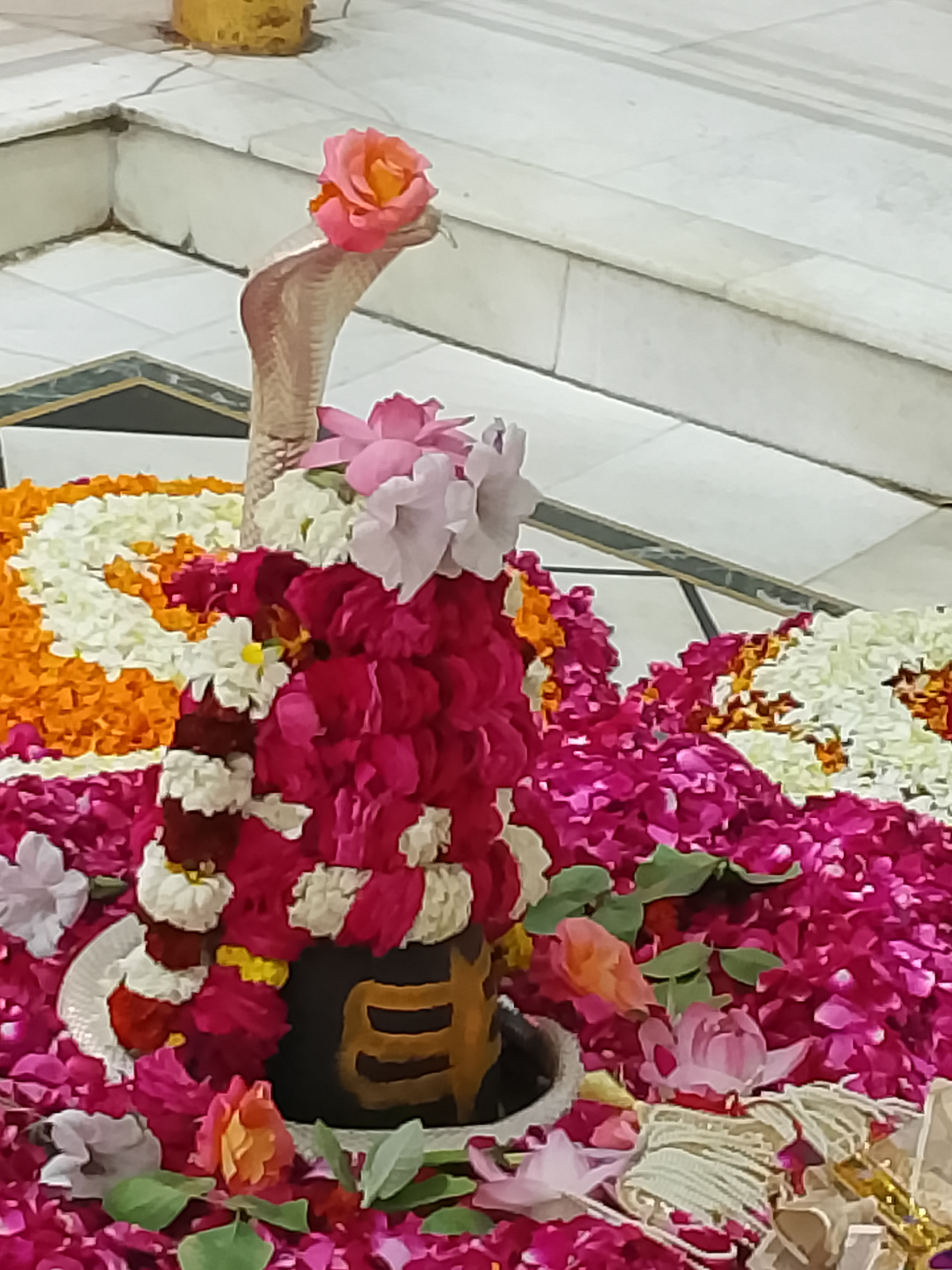

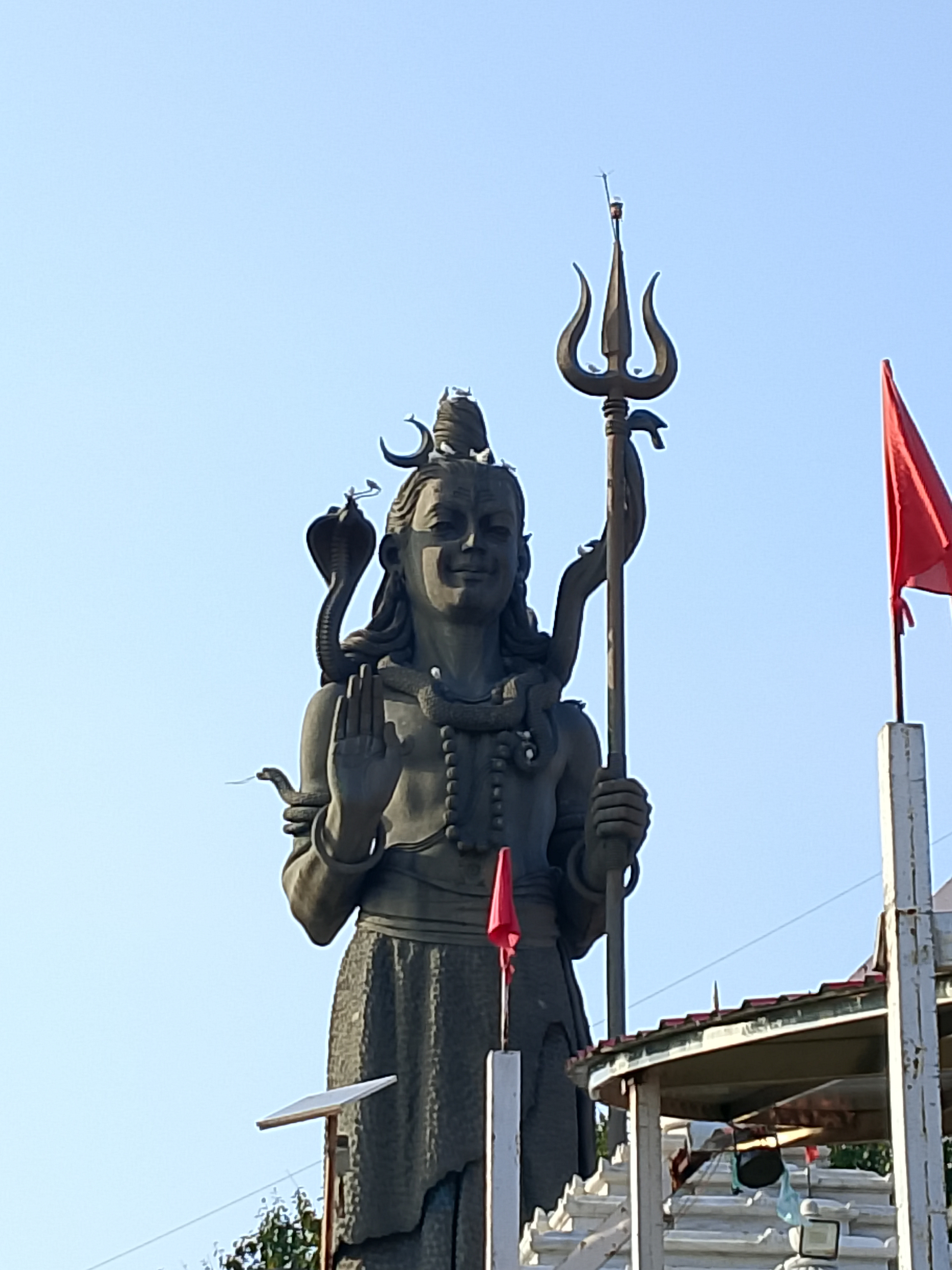

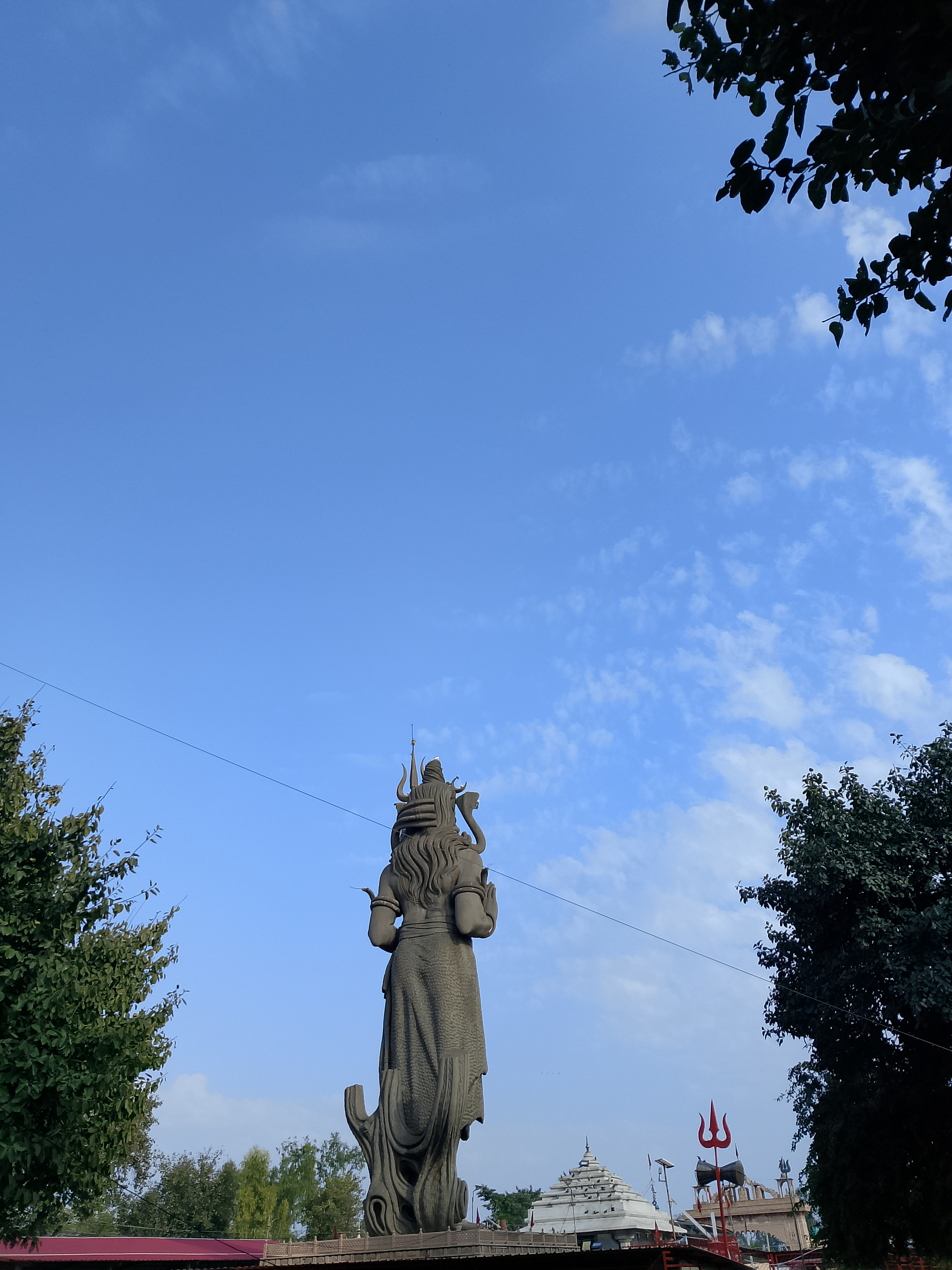

== See also ==
- Rajpura
- Swayambhu
