= Lehal (disambiguation) =

Lehal is a family name.

Lehal may also refer to the following places in Punjab, India:

- Lehal, Jalandhar
- Lehal, Patiala
- Lehal Kalan
