= Jawaad Khan =

Indian engineer and entrepreneur

- Born: Mohammad Jawaad Khan; Bhaderwah, India
- Education: Swami Vivekanand Institute of Engineering & Technology
- Title: Founder of Tadpole Projects Pvt. Ltd.
- Engineering career
- Discipline: Electrical engineering
- Institutions: Swami Vivekanand Institute of Engineering & Technology
- Projects: SVIET Volta, Vintage Retrofitting
- Significant design: Electric Vehicle
- Awards: Indian Achievers' Award 2020-21 for Young Entrepreneur
- Website: tadpoleprojects.com

Jawaad Khan is an Indian electrical engineer and entrepreneur from Bhaderwah who founded the Tadpole Projects. He is known for converting various vintage cars into electric vehicles. He was conferred with Indian Achievers Award 2021.

== Biography ==
Jawaad Khan hails from Bhaderwah. He received a B.Tech from the Swami Vivekanand Institute of Engineering and Technology (SVIET). In 2019, he converted a Maruti Suzuki 800 into an eco-friendly electric vehicle for his college project at SVIET naming his first converted vehicle SVIET Volta. The car got huge attention and he won a sponsorship for the Inno-Fest. He completed the 110 kmph top speed electric vehicle SVIET Volta after spending about 15 months in the Electrical Engineering Department R&D Cell of SVIET. According to The New Indian Express report of 6 February 2021, the seventy percent of the material for this car is bought from India, only the controllers were imported from China.

Khan founded Tadpole Projects, an electric vehicle making company, which collaborated with IIT Delhi's Centre of Excellence for Research on Clean Air (CERCA) to turn a Beetle car into an electric vehicle. He is considered first Indian who retrofitted a 1948 Beetle car into an eco-friendly electric vehicle. He was conferred with the Indian Achievers Award 2021 for Young Entrepreneur, a national award recognising achievements since 2000 by Indian Achievers' Forum.
