= Gurdwara Dukh Nivaran Sahib =

Sikh gurdwara in Patiala, India

Coordinates: 30.3471°N 76.3961°E

Dukh Nivaran Sahib
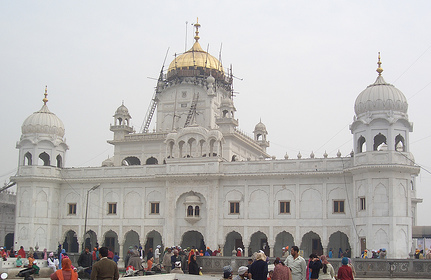
- Dukh Nivaran Sahib

General information
- Architectural style: Sikh architecture
- Location: Patiala, India

Gurdwara Dukh Nivaran Sahib is situated in what used to be the village of Lehal, now part of Patiala city.

== History ==
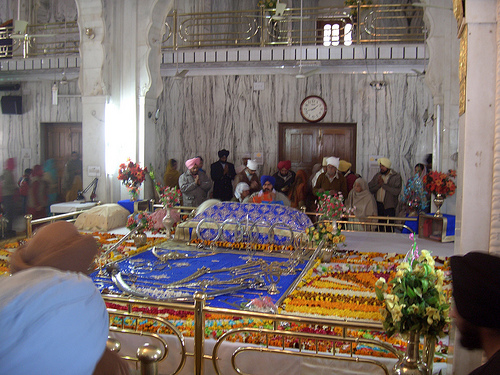
Darbar Sahib

=== Visit of Guru Tegh Bahadur ===
According to local tradition, supported by an old handwritten document preserved in the Gurudwara, one Bhag Ram, a jhivar of Lehal, waited upon ninth guru of Sikhs Guru Tegh Bahadur during his sojourn at Saifabad (now Bahadurgarh), and made the request that he might be pleased to visit and bless his village so that its inhabitants could be rid of a serious and mysterious sickness which had been their bane for a long time.

The Guru visited Lehal on Magh Sudi 5, 1728 Bikram (24 January 1672) and stayed under a banyan tree by the side of a pond. The sickness in the village subsided. The site where Guru Tegh Bahadur had sat came to be known as Dukh Nivaran, literally meaning eradicator of suffering. Devotees have faith in the healing qualities of water in the sarovar attached to the shrine.

=== Memorial Garden ===
Raja Amar Singh of Patiala (1748–82) had a garden laid out on the site as a memorial which he entrusted to Nihang Sikhs. Records of a court case in 1870 mention a Guru's garden and a Nihangs' well being in existence here. In 1920, during a survey for the proposed construction of Sirhind-Patiala-Jakhal railway line, it appeared that the banyan tree under which had sat Guru Tegh Bahadur would have to be removed. But men charged with felling it refused to touch it. Ultimately, Maharaja Bhupinder Singh ordered cancellation of the entire project.

=== Gurudwara Construction ===
No gurudwara building had, however, been raised. It was only in 1930 that a committee was formed to collect funds and commence construction and was completed twelve years later in the year 1942. Maharaja Yadavindra Singh who was a devout Sikh built the present building and sarovar. The Gurdwara when completed passed under the administrative control of the Patiala state government. It was later transferred to the Dharam Arth Board of the Patiala and East Punjab States Union and eventually to the Shiromani Gurudwara Prabandhak Committee.

== Gurdwara Dukh Nivaran Sahib Complex ==
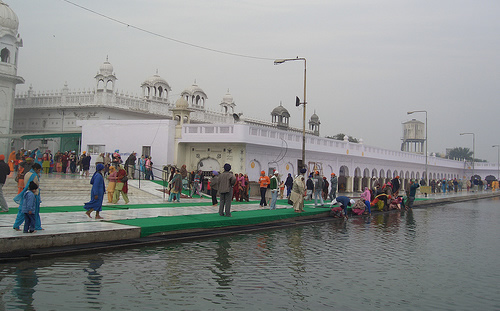
The sarovar adjacent to Gurdwara Dukh Nivaran, Patiala

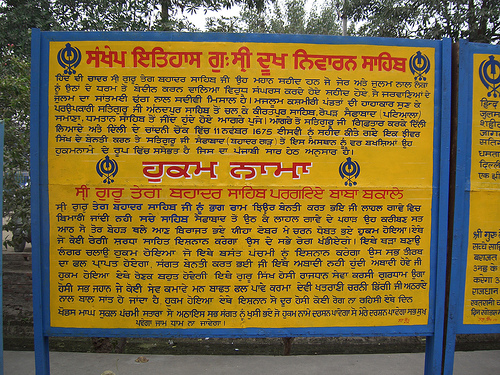
Notice board depicting History of Gurdwara

The building complex sprawls over several acres. The two storey gateway has a collapsible iron gate and black and white marble floor. On the left of the pathway leading to the principal building is a small marble shrine marking the site where Guru Teg Bahadur had sat under the banyan tree. The central two storey building, with a domed pavilion on top, is on a raised base having an octagonal domed chamber at each corner. The pinnacled lotus dome on top has a round sun-window on each side with a curved coping, projected horizontally at the ends. There are decorative domed pavilions at the corners and lotus blossoms in leaf in the middle on top of the walls.

The interior is paved with marble slabs in white and grey against black and white of the outer platform. The walls and pillars are also panelled with white marble slabs. The ceiling is decorated with stucco work in floral design. The Guru Granth Sahib is seated under a square canopy at the far end. The 75metre square sarovar, since considerably extended, is on the right and Guru ka Langar on the left as one enters. The Gurdwara is administered by the Shiromani Gurdwara Parbandhak Committee. A big gathering is held on the fifth day of the light half of each lunar month. The festival of the year is Basant Panchmi which marks the day of Guru Tegh Bahadur's visit.

=== Gallery ===
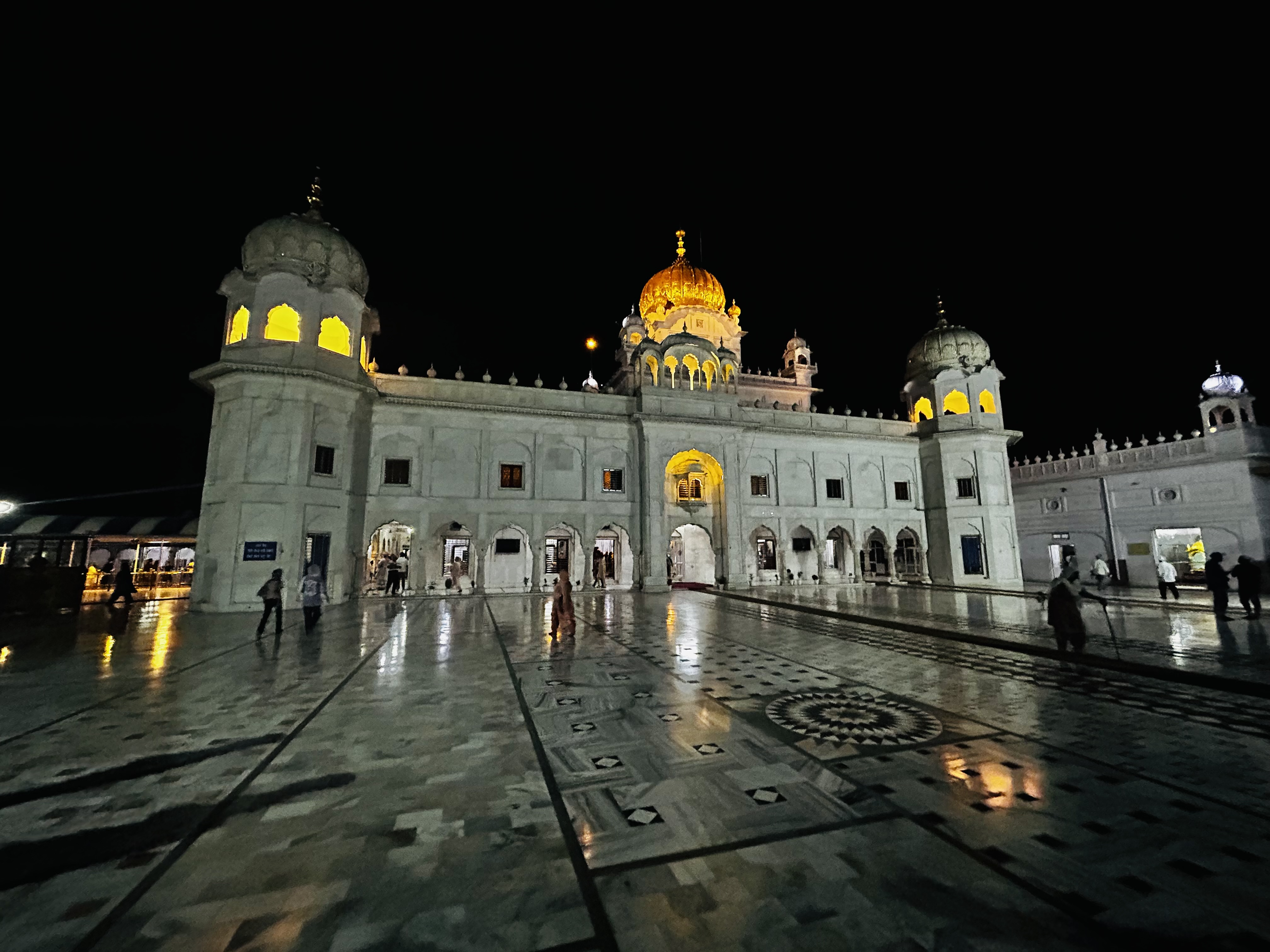

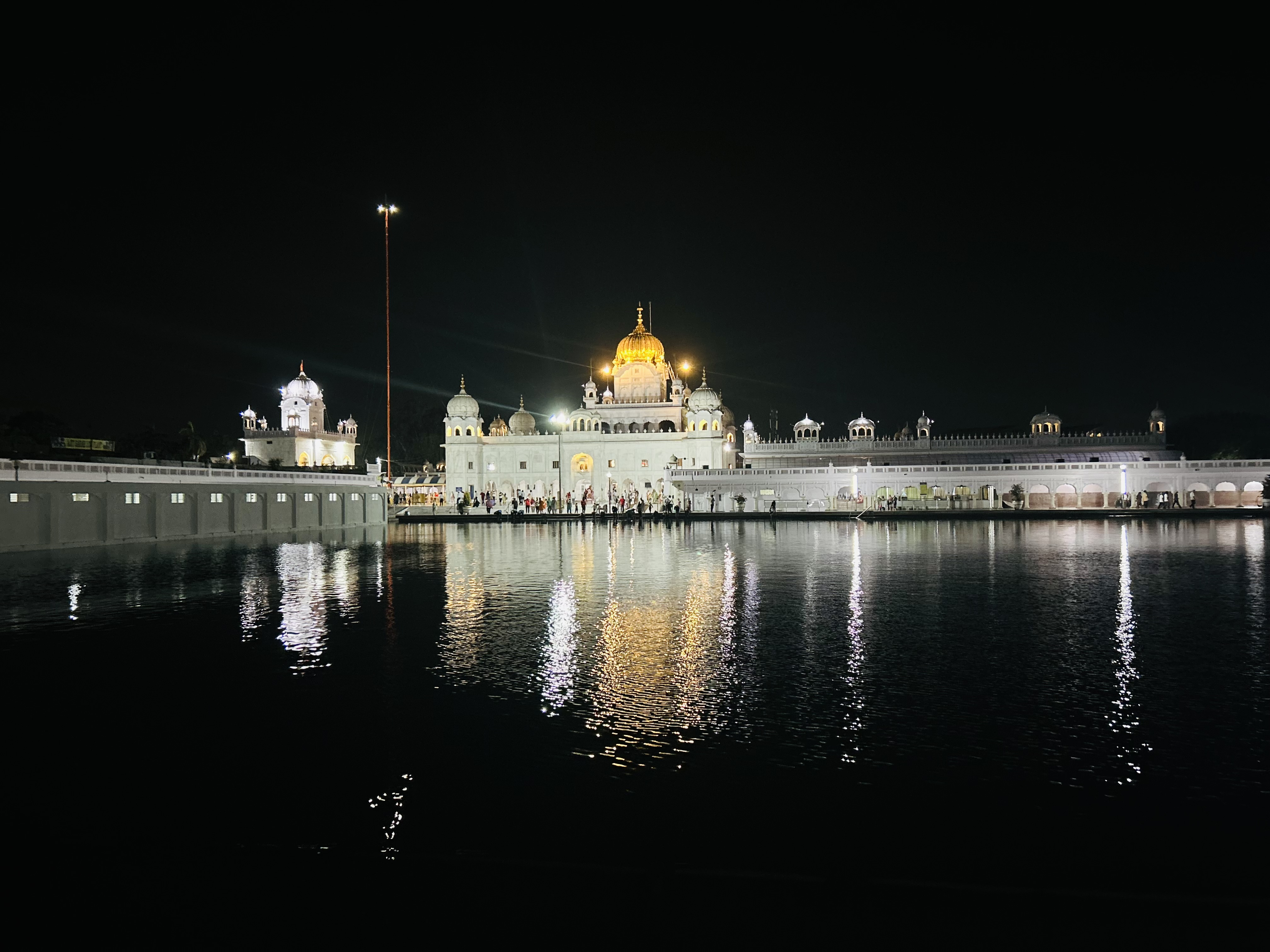

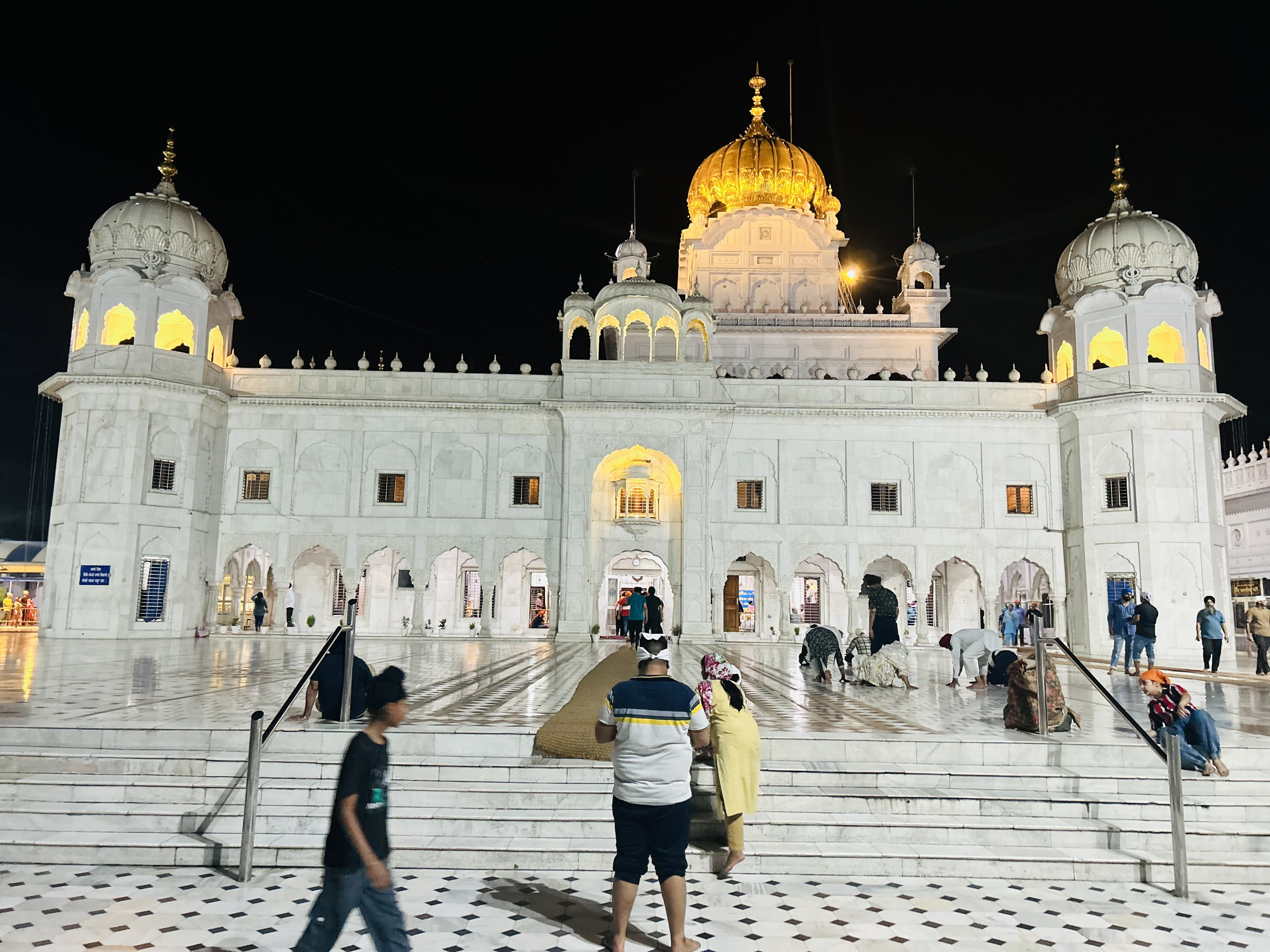

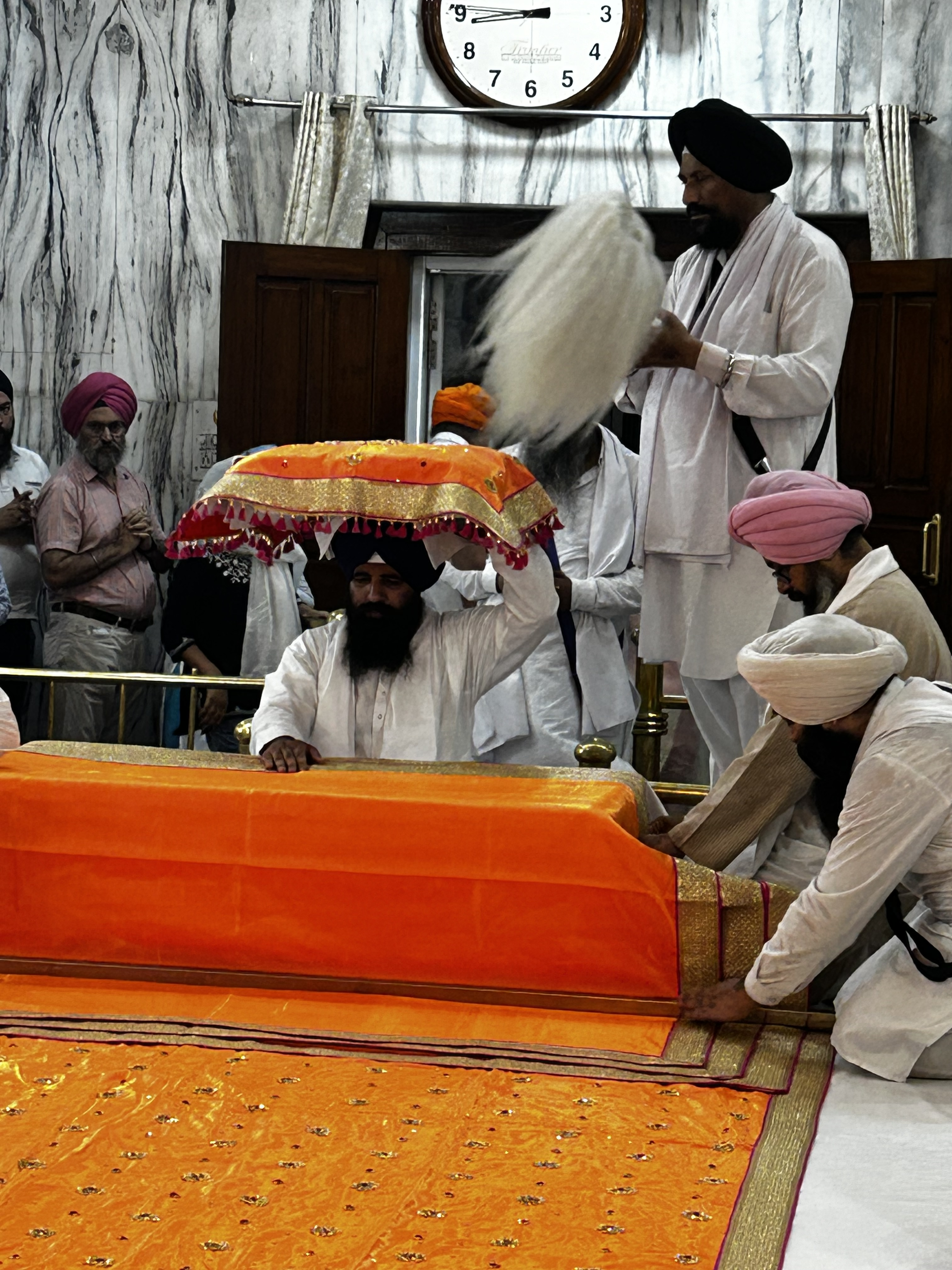
