= Shri Kali Devi Temple, Patiala =

Hindu Temple in Punjab, India

Shri Kali Devi Temple
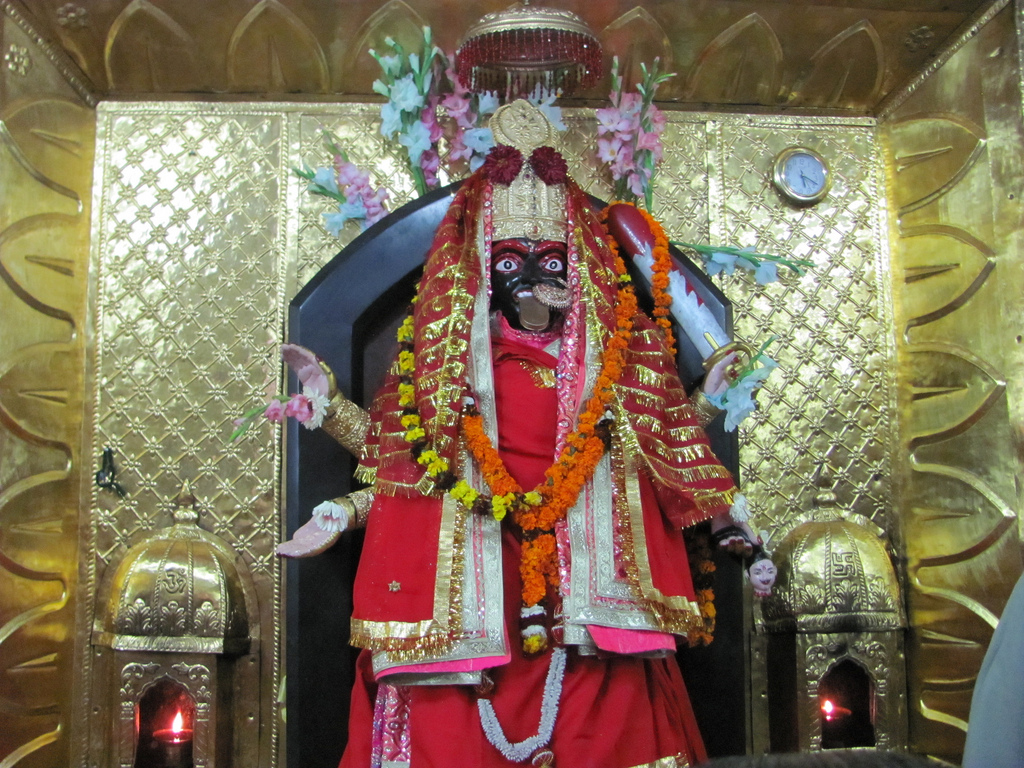
- Maa Kali inside the temple

Religion
- Affiliation: Hinduism
- District: Patiala district
- Deity: Goddess Kali Devi

Location
- Location: Patiala
- State: Punjab
- Country: India
- Interactive map of Shri Kali Devi Temple
- Coordinates: 30.336157°N 76.39418°E

Architecture
- Founder: Maharaja of Patiala: Bhupinder Singh of Patiala
- Completed: 1938

Website
- mandirkalidevijipatiala.org

Shri Kali Devi Temple is a Hindu temple in Patiala, Punjab, India. It was built by the Maharaja of Patiala in 1936. The Maharaja was inspired to build the temple and bring the six-foot-tall statues of Maa Kali and Paawan Jyot from Bengal to Patiala. Today, the temple is situated opposite the Baradari Gardens. Shri Kali Devi is a kul devi of many people. During the Navratras, the temple has many visitors over the course of nine days.
