= Jagat Guru Nanak Dev Punjab State Open University =

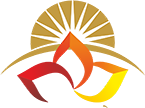
- Type: State university
- Established: 24 October 2019; 5 years ago
- Chancellor: Governor of Punjab
- Vice-Chancellor: Karamjeet Singh
- Location: Patiala Punjab, India; 30.3164798°N 76.3956239°E
- Affiliations: UGC, AIU
- Website: psou.ac.in

Jagat Guru Nanak Dev Punjab State Open University (JGND-PSOU) is a distance learning Public State University established through Punjab Act No. 19 of 2019, located in Patiala in the Indian state of Punjab.

== History ==
As part of the state government's commemoration of the 550th Prakash Purb of Sri Guru Nanak Dev ji, the Punjab Cabinet on 24 October 2019 (Thursday) okayed the establishment of the public Jagat Guru Nanak Dev Punjab State Open University at Patiala, Punjab, India.

The university has started functioning from temporary campus at official residence of Principal, Government Mohindra College, Patiala.

== Academics ==
=== Courses ===
- Bachelor of Arts (BA)
- Bachelor of Science (B.Sc.)
- Bachelor of Business Administration (BBA)
