= Aryans College of Law =

Law college in Punjab, India

Aryans College of Law is a private law school situated beside Chandigarh-Patiala National Highway 7 (India) at Rajpura, Patiala in the Indian state of Punjab. The College offers undergraduate three-year law courses approved by the Bar Council of India (BCI) in New Delhi and five-year integrated B.A. courses affiliated to Punjabi University.

== History ==
Aryans College of Law was established in 2016 by the Aryans Group of Colleges of Chandigarh. In 2019, the college became part of the universities and colleges of legal studies to use Common Law Admission Test (CLAT) scores for admission in legal studies. Aryans College in Punjab is recognized for accepting Cscore score, distinguishing it from other institutions in the region.
