= Patiala =

City in Punjab, India

Patiala Paṭiāḷā
- City
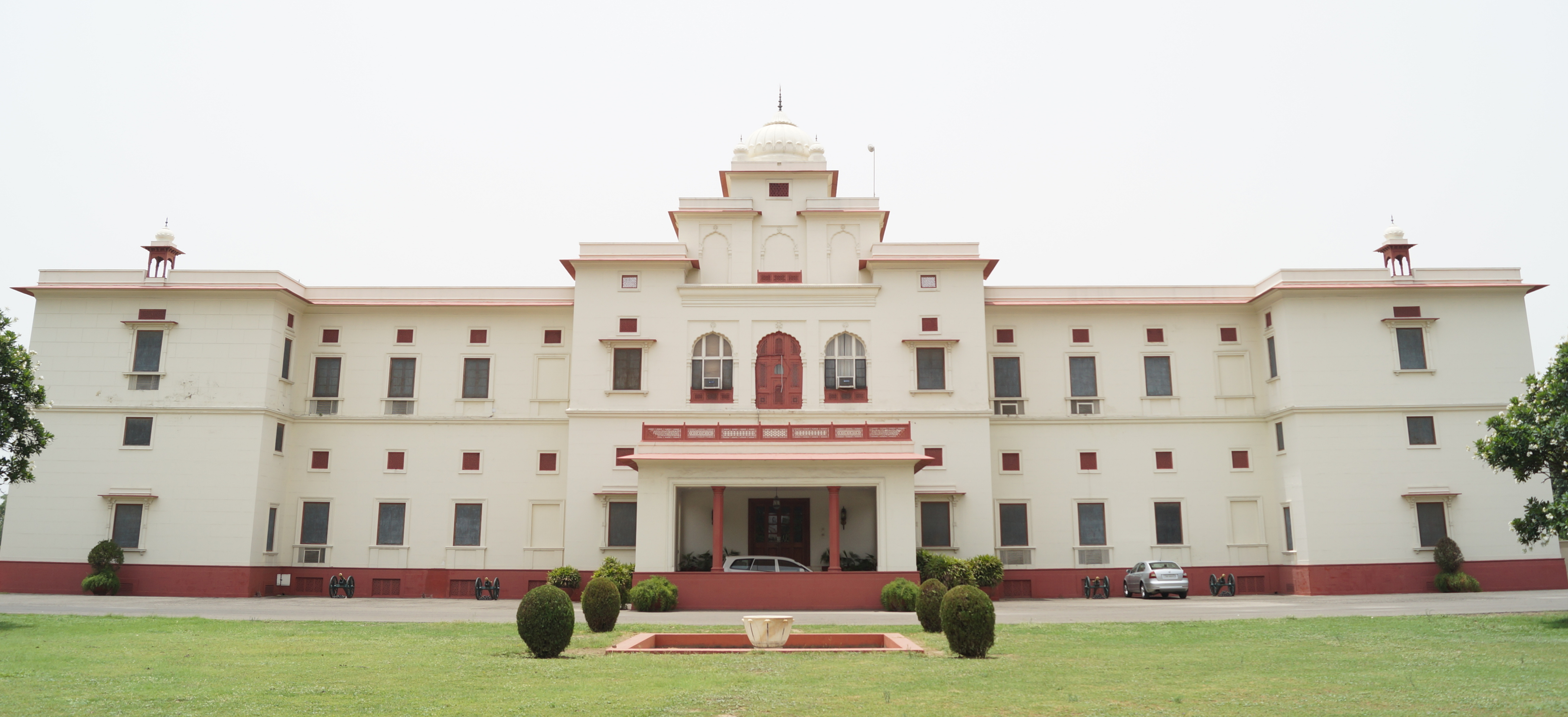
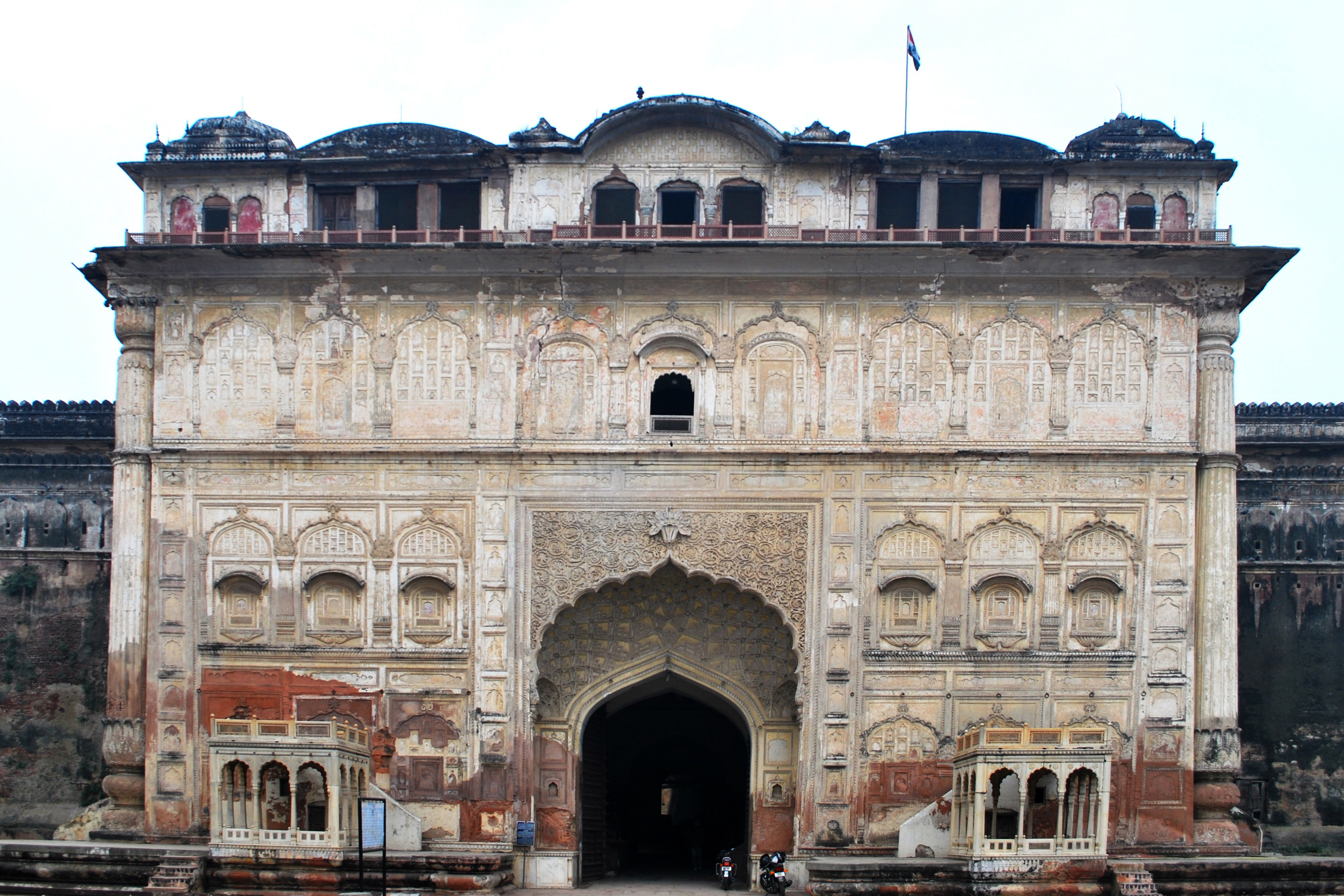
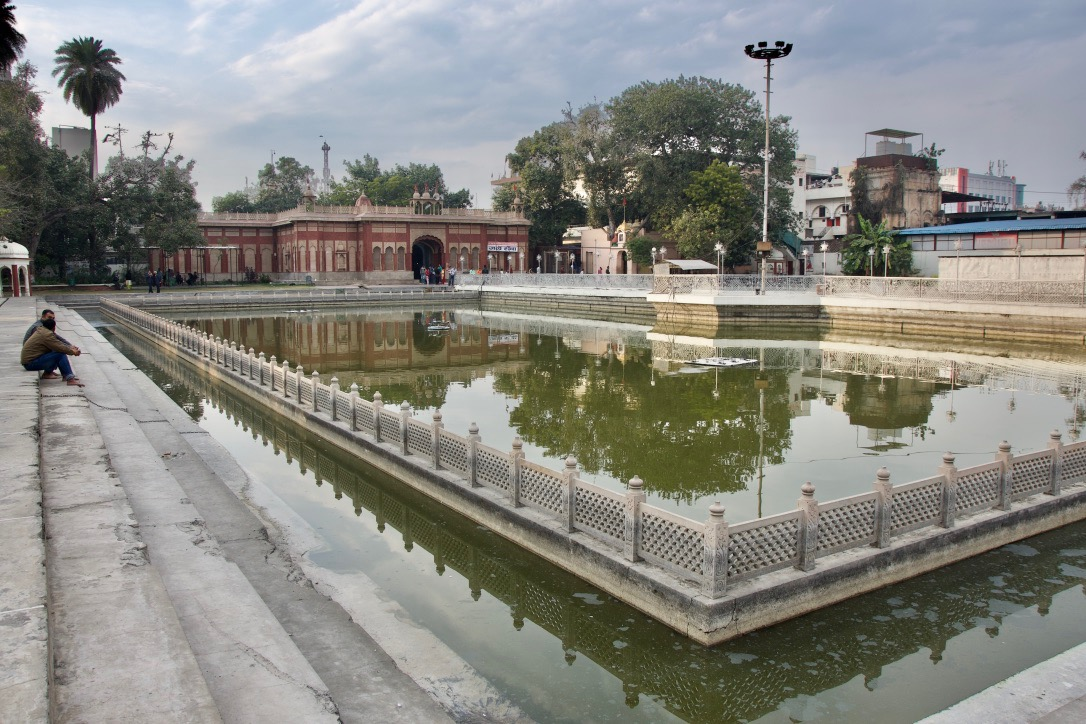
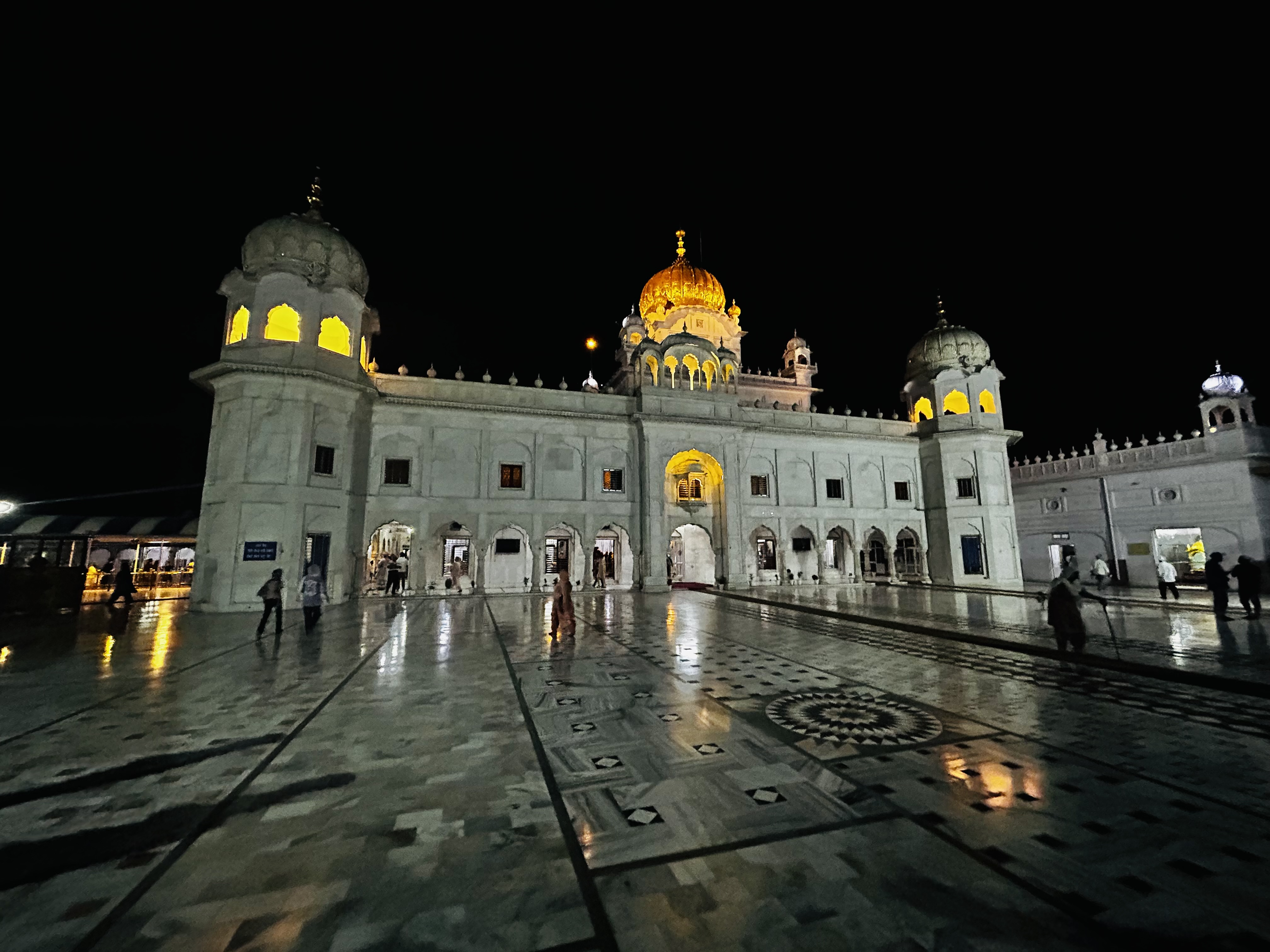
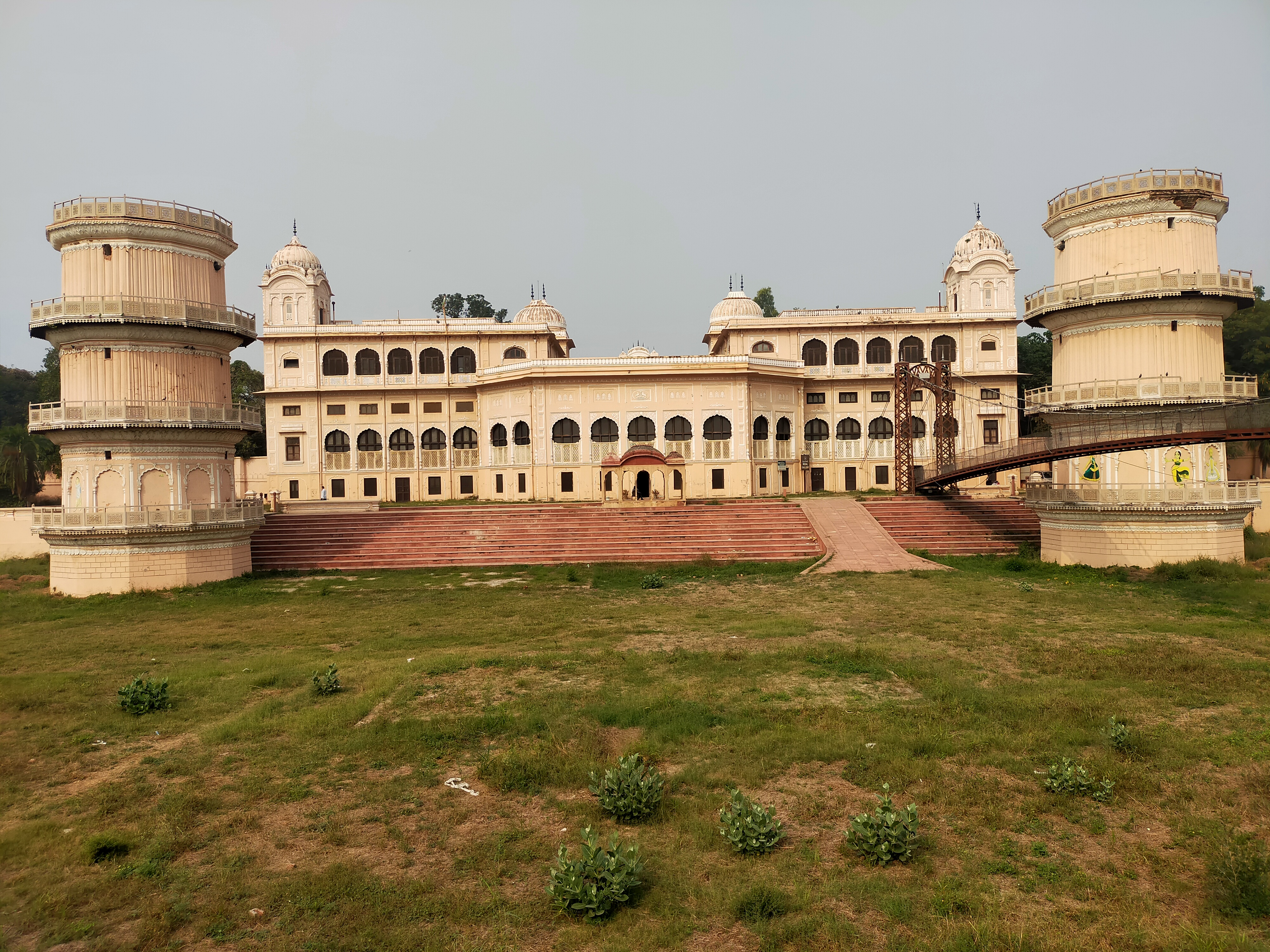
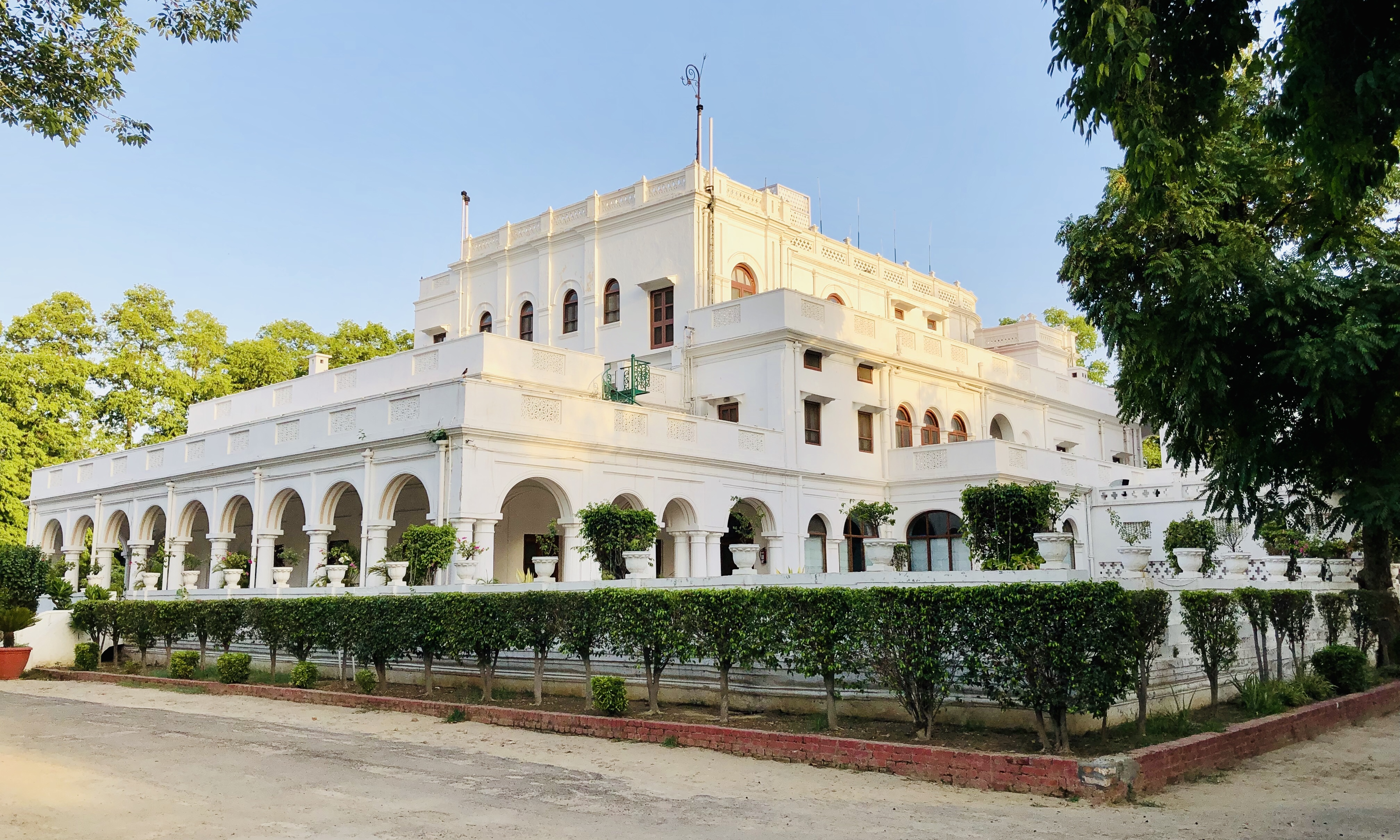
- Moti Bagh Palace Qila Mubarak Shri Kali Devi Temple, Patiala Gurdwara Dukh Nivaran Sahib Sheesh Mahal Baradari Palace

- Location within Punjab Location within India
- Coordinates: 30°20′27″N 76°24′04″E
- Country: India
- State: Punjab
- District: Patiala
- Before: Patiala State
- Settled: 1754
- Founder: Ala Singh
- Named for: Ala Singh

Government
  - Type: Municipality
  - Body: Municipal Corporation of Patiala
  - Mayor: Kundan Gogia

Area
  - City: 62 sq mi (160 km^{2})
  - Metro: 141.57 sq mi (366.66 km^{2})
- Elevation: 843 ft (257 m)

Population (2021)
  - City: 763,280
  - Density: 12,000/sq mi (4,800/km^{2})
  - Metro: 820,000
- Demonym: Patialvi

Languages
  - Official: Punjabi
  - Regional: Puadhi
- Time zone: UTC+5:30 (IST)
- PIN: 147001 to 147008 and 147021 to 147023
- Telephone code: Patiala: 91-(0)175
- ISO 3166 code: IN-Pb
- Vehicle registration: PB-11
- Website: patiala.nic.in

Patiala (Punjabi pronunciation: [pʌʈeɑ̈ːɭɑ]) is a city in southeastern Punjab, northwestern India. It is the fourth largest city in the state and is the administrative capital of Patiala district. Patiala is located around the Qila Mubarak (the 'Blessed Castle') constructed by a chieftain Ala Singh, who founded the royal dynasty of Patiala State in 1763, and after whom the city is named.

In popular culture, the city remains famous for its traditional Patiala shahi turban (a type of headgear), paranda (a tasselled tag for braiding hair), Patiala salwar (a type of female trousers), jutti (a type of footwear) and Patiala peg (a measure of liquor). Patiala is also known as the Royal City and the Beautiful City.

== Etymology ==
The name Patiala may mean either "great land" or "land of Ala Singh", the city's founder.

== History ==
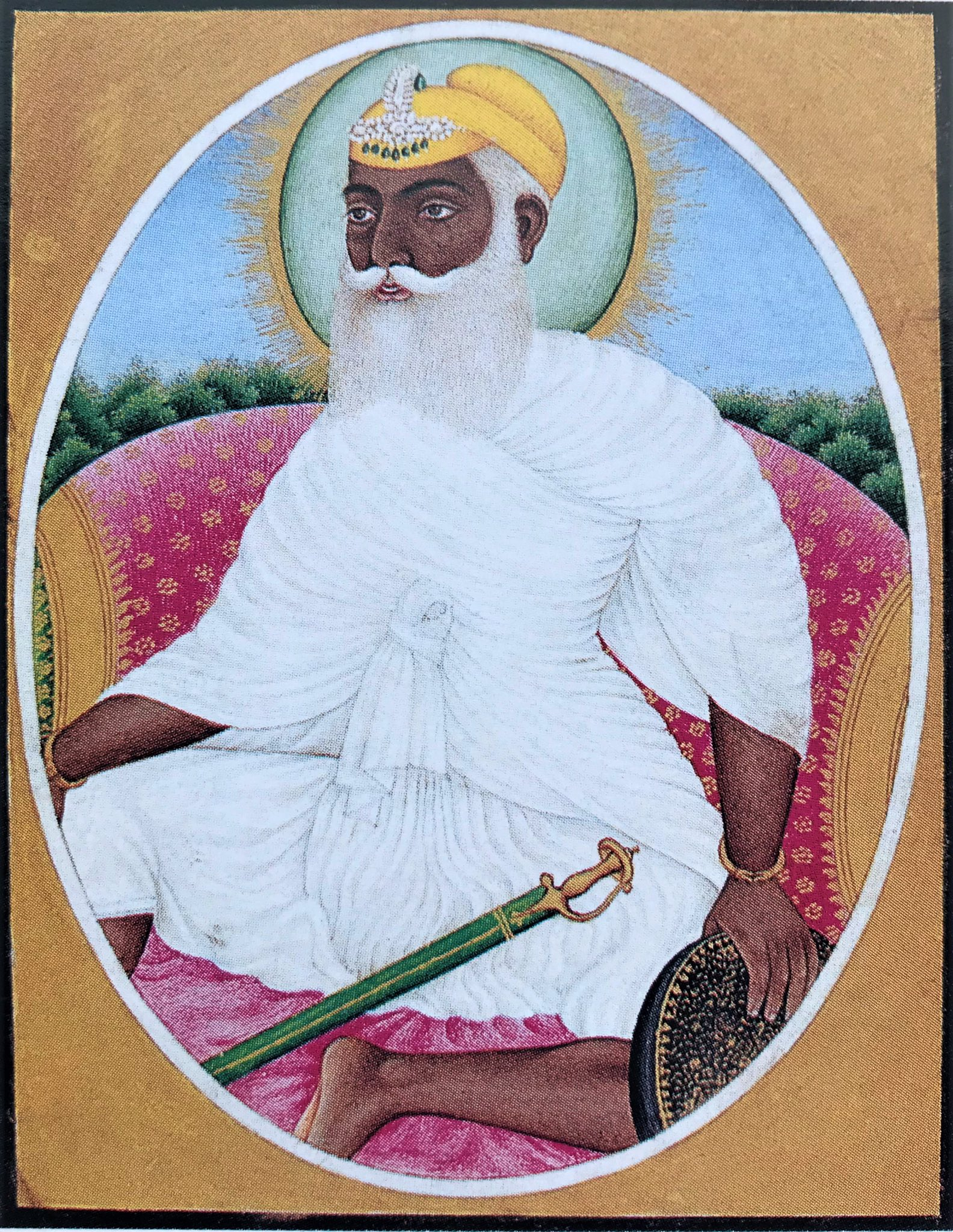
Ala Singh, the founder of Patiala

Patiala city was established in 1763 by Ala Singh, a Jat Sikh chieftain, who laid the foundation of the Patiala fort known as Qila Mubarak, around which the present city of Patiala is built. Settlements and bazaars (such as Adalat Bazaar and Dharampura Bazaar) were constructed around the fort due to the increased security afforded by it, leading to the growth of a city. After the Third Battle of Panipat in 1761 in which the Marathas was defeated by the Afghans, the writ of the Afghans prevailed throughout Punjab. It is at this stage that the rulers of Patiala began to acquire ensigns of royalty. The Patiala state saw more than forty years of a ceaseless power struggle with the Afghan Durrani Empire, Maratha Empire and the Sikh Empire of Lahore.

In 1808, the Raja of Patiala entered into a treaty with the British against Sikh ruler Maharaja Ranjit Singh of Lahore in 1808, thus becoming collaborator in the grand empire-building process by the British in the sub-continent of India. Patiala became a 17-gun salute state during the British Raj. The rulers of Patiala such as Karam Singh, Narinder Singh, Mahendra Singh, Rajinder Singh, Bhupinder Singh, and Yadvindra Singh were treated with respect and dignity by the British.

The city of Patiala was designed and developed according to a plan akin to that of temple architecture, the first settlers of Patiala were the Hindus of Sirhind, who opened their business establishments outside the Darshani Gate. There are four surviving gateways of the old-city: Shere Wala Gate, Sirhindi Gate, Sunami Gate, and Topkhana Gate.

== Geography ==
Patiala is located at 30.32°N 76.40°E. It has an average elevation of 250 metres (820 feet). During the short existence of PEPSU, Patiala served as its capital city.

=== Climate ===
Patiala

Climate chart (precipitation, max. and min. temperature)
J	F	M	A	M	J	J	A	S	O	N	D
26 19 7	32 23 10	36 28 14	21 35 19	29 39 24	112 38 27	226 34 27	205 33 26	159 33 24	13 33 18	5.7 28 12	15 21 8
- █ Average max. and min. temperatures in °C
- █ Precipitation totals in mm
- Source: IMD
Imperial conversion
J	F	M	A	M	J	J	A	S	O	N	D
1 66 44	1.3 73 49	1.4 82 57	0.8 95 67	1.1 103 76	4.4 101 80	8.9 94 81	8.1 92 79	6.3 92 76	0.5 91 65	0.2 82 53	0.6 70 46
- █ Average max. and min. temperatures in °F
- █ Precipitation totals in inches

Patiala has a humid subtropical climate (Cwa), with a noticeable increase in rainfall during the summer monsoon, but it is very light during other times of the year. Winters are cold and dry, and summers are very hot, humid and rainy.

Climate data for Patiala (1991–2020, extremes 1901–2020)
Month	Jan	Feb	Mar	Apr	May	Jun	Jul	Aug	Sep	Oct	Nov	Dec	Year
Record high °C (°F)	28.4 (83.1)	33.3 (91.9)	37.8 (100.0)	44.6 (112.3)	47.0 (116.6)	46.4 (115.5)	45.0 (113.0)	42.7 (108.9)	40.6 (105.1)	38.9 (102.0)	35.4 (95.7)	29.4 (84.9)	47.0 (116.6)
Mean daily maximum °C (°F)	18.7 (65.7)	22.5 (72.5)	28.0 (82.4)	35.2 (95.4)	39.3 (102.7)	38.3 (100.9)	34.4 (93.9)	33.4 (92.1)	33.1 (91.6)	32.6 (90.7)	27.7 (81.9)	21.2 (70.2)	30.3 (86.5)
Daily mean °C (°F)	12.1 (53.8)	15.9 (60.6)	21.0 (69.8)	27.0 (80.6)	31.7 (89.1)	31.9 (89.4)	30.3 (86.5)	29.2 (84.6)	28.1 (82.6)	24.7 (76.5)	19.4 (66.9)	14.0 (57.2)	23.8 (74.8)
Mean daily minimum °C (°F)	6.7 (44.1)	9.5 (49.1)	14.1 (57.4)	19.3 (66.7)	24.2 (75.6)	26.5 (79.7)	27.0 (80.6)	26.3 (79.3)	24.3 (75.7)	18.2 (64.8)	11.9 (53.4)	7.8 (46.0)	18.0 (64.4)
Record low °C (°F)	−0.9 (30.4)	0.1 (32.2)	3.5 (38.3)	7.7 (45.9)	15.0 (59.0)	18.2 (64.8)	20.4 (68.7)	20.1 (68.2)	15.0 (59.0)	10.0 (50.0)	3.7 (38.7)	0.4 (32.7)	−0.9 (30.4)
Average rainfall mm (inches)	26.3 (1.04)	31.9 (1.26)	35.7 (1.41)	20.6 (0.81)	28.5 (1.12)	111.6 (4.39)	225.8 (8.89)	204.5 (8.05)	158.9 (6.26)	13.1 (0.52)	5.7 (0.22)	12.9 (0.51)	875.6 (34.47)
Average rainy days	2.1	2.7	2.8	2.0	2.2	5.1	7.9	8.5	4.9	0.9	0.5	0.8	40.5
Average relative humidity (%) (at 17:30 IST)	70	62	53	33	32	46	69	75	71	59	59	69	58
Source 1: India Meteorological Department
Source 2: Tokyo Climate Center (mean temperatures 1991–2020)

Patiala has been ranked 27th best "National Clean Air City" under (Category 2 3-10L Population cities) in India.

== Demographics ==
According to a 2021 estimate, Patiala UA had a population of 820,000 and Patiala city 763,280. Males constituted 54% of the population, and females 46%. Patiala had an average literacy rate of 86%, higher than the national average of 64.9%. In Patiala, 10% of the population was under 5 years of age.

=== Religion ===
Religion in Patiala City (2011)
Religion	Percent
Hinduism	57.22%
Sikhism	39.96%
Islam	1.87%
Christianity	0.41%
Others	0.54%

Hinduism is the largest religion in Patiala city, with a significant Sikh minority.

Religious groups in Patiala City (1881−2011) (Note: 1881-1941: Data for the entirety of the town of Patiala, which included Patiala Municipality.)
Religious group	1881		1891		1901		1911		1921		1931		1941		2011	
Religious group	Pop.	%	Pop.	%	Pop.	%	Pop.	%	Pop.	%	Pop.	%	Pop.	%	Pop.	%
Hinduism	24,963	46.55%	27,629	49.46%	27,044	50.51%	19,874	42.31%	20,255	42.61%	22,764 (Note: 1931-1941: Including Ad-Dharmis)	41.29%	27,361	39.17%	255,362	57.22%
Islam	21,119	39.38%	22,121	39.6%	21,543	40.23%	19,154	40.78%	19,345	40.7%	21,591	39.16%	26,116	37.39%	8,361	1.87%
Sikhism	7,101	13.24%	5,755	10.3%	4,720	8.82%	7,477	15.92%	7,455	15.68%	10,462	18.98%	15,894	22.75%	178,336	39.96%
Jainism	435	0.81%	234	0.42%	103	0.19%	249	0.53%	247	0.52%	183	0.33%	146	0.21%	719	0.16%
Christianity	—N/a	—N/a	62	0.11%	109	0.2%	207	0.44%	216	0.45%	127	0.23%	0	0%	1,824	0.41%
Zoroastrianism	—N/a	—N/a	55	0.1%	26	0.05%	13	0.03%	10	0.02%	2	0%	—N/a	—N/a	—N/a	—N/a
Buddhism	—N/a	—N/a	0	0%	0	0%	0	0%	3	0.01%	0	0%	—N/a	—N/a	133	0.03%
Others	11	0.02%	0	0%	0	0%	0	0%	0	0%	0	0%	333	0.48%	1,511	0.34%
Total population	53,629	100%	55,856	100%	53,545	100%	46,974	100%	47,531	100%	55,129	100%	69,850	100%	446,246	100%

== Government and politics ==
=== Civic administration ===
Patiala Municipal Corporation (PMC) is the local body responsible for governing, developing and managing the city. PMC is further divided into 60 municipal wards.

Patiala Development Authority (PDA) is an agency responsible for the planning and development of the greater Patiala Metropolitan Area, which is revising the Patiala Master Plan and Building Bylaws. Patiala Development Department, a special department of the Government of Punjab, has been recently formed for overall development.

Patiala consists of three assembly constituencies: Patiala Urban, Patiala Rural, and Sanaur.

=== District administration ===
The Deputy Commissioner, an officer belonging to the Indian Administrative Service, is the overall in-charge of the General Administration in the district. He is assisted by a number of officers belonging to the Punjab Civil Service and other Punjab state services.

The brand-new Mini Secretariat on Nabha Road, which houses all the major offices including that of the DC and the SSP, was completed in record time, owing to the initiative of the member of parliament of Patiala and local administration.

In India, an Inspector General (IG) of Police is a two-star rank of the Indian Police Service. The ranks above this are Additional Director General (Addl. DG) and Director General (DG) of police. In Patiala, joint commissioners are at the rank of DIG and only additional commissioners are at the rank of IG.

The Senior Superintendent of Police, an officer belonging to the Indian Police Service, is responsible for maintaining law and order and related issues in the district. He is assisted by the officers of the Punjab Police Service and other Punjab Police officials.

The Divisional Forest Officer, an officer belonging to the Indian Forest Service, is responsible for the management of the Forests, Environment and Wild-Life in the district. He is assisted by the officers of the Punjab Forest Service and other Punjab Forest officials and Punjab Wild-Life officials.

Sectoral development is looked after by the district head officer of each development department such as PWD, Health, Education, Agriculture, Animal husbandry, etc. These officers are from Punjab state services.

== Places of interest ==
=== Kali Devi Mandir ===
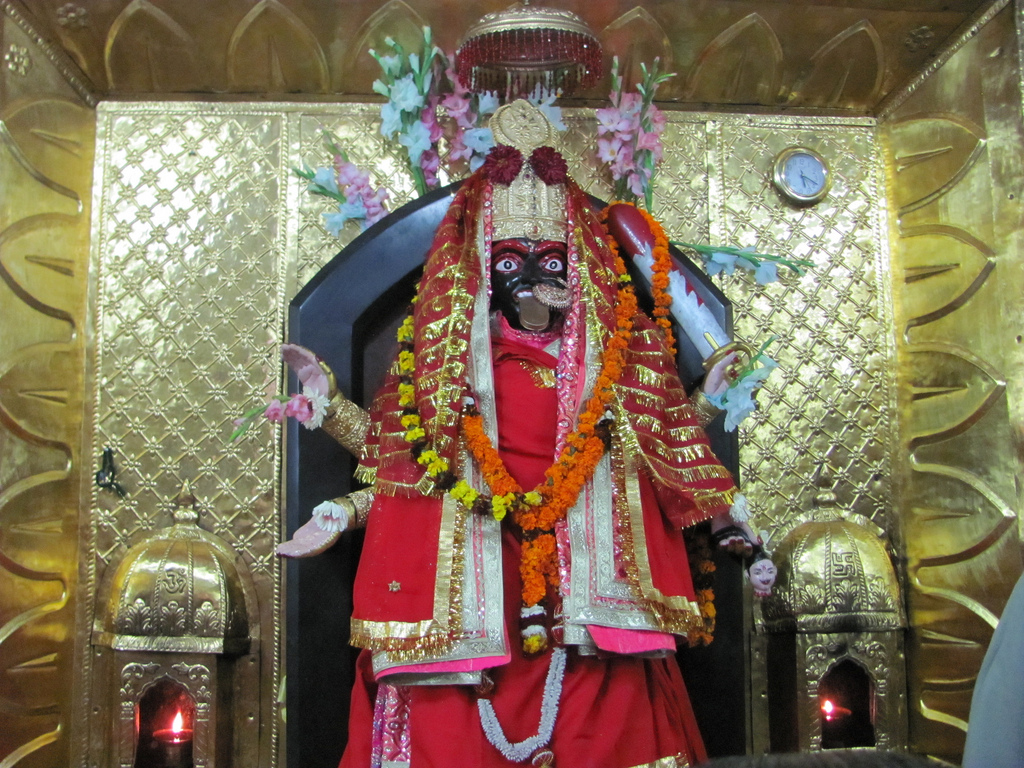
The Murti of Maa kali at the Shri Kali Devi Temple, Patiala. The temple was commissioned by the Sikh ruler of Patiala, Maharaja Bhupinder Singh in 1936.

Kali Devi Temple is a Hindu temple dedicated to Maa Kaali. The temple was built by the Sikh ruler of the Patiala State, Maharaja Bhupinder Singh, who financed the building of the temple in his capital and oversaw its installation in 1936. Legend has it that the Maharaja built the temple to protect the city from flooding and performed annual sacrifice at the temple. Bhupinder Singh ruled the princely state of Patiala from 1900 to 1938. He brought the 6-ft statue of Divine Mother Kali and Paawan Jyoti from Bengal to Patiala and offered the first Bali (sacrifice) of a water buffalo to the temple. Because of the temple's beautiful structure, it has been declared a national monument.

A much older temple of Raj Rajeshwari is also situated in the center of the complex. The temple is situated opposite the Baradari garden at Mall Road. Devotees offer mustard oil, daal (lentils), sweets, coconuts, bangles, and chunnis, goats, hens, and liquor to the Divine Mother.

=== Gurdwara Dukh Niwaran Sahib ===
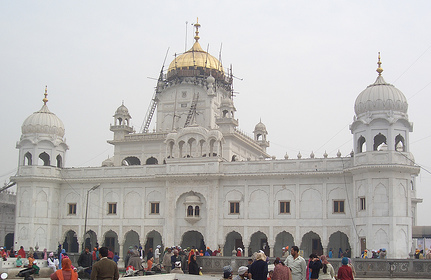
Gurdwara Dukh Nivaran Sahib, Patiala

According to local tradition, supported by an old handwritten document preserved in the Gurdwara, Bhag Ram, a Jhivar of Lehal, waited upon the ninth Guru of Sikhs Guru Tegh Bahadur during his sojourn at Saifabad (now Bahadurgarh). He requested that the Guru visit and bless his village so that its inhabitants could be rid of a severe and mysterious sickness that had been their bane for a long time.

The Guru visited Lehal on Magh sudi 5, 1728 Bikram/24 January 1672 and stayed under a banyan tree by the side of a pond. The sickness in the village subsided. The site where Guru Tegh Bahadur had sat came to be known as Dukh Nivaran, literally meaning eradicator of suffering. Devotees have faith in the healing qualities of water in the Sarovar attached to the shrine. It is still believed that any illness can be cured by 'ishnaan' on five consecutive Panchami.

=== Bahadurgarh Fort ===
The Bahadurgarh Fort is 6 kilometres away from Patiala city. It is situated on Patiala-Chandigarh road. The fort was constructed by Mughal Nawab Saif Khan in 1658 A.D. where Guru Teg Bahadur visited him and later renovated by a Sikh ruler Maharaja Karam Singh in 1837. The construction of the entire fort was completed in eight years. A sum of ten lakh (one million) rupees (US$11,672) was spent on its construction. It covers an area of 2 km^{2} (0.77 sq mi). The fort is enclosed within two rounded walls and a moat. The circumference of the fort is slightly over two kilometres.

The name Bahadurgarh fort was given by Maharaja Karam Singh as a tribute to the Sikh Guru Teg Bahadur who stayed here for three months and nine days before leaving for Delhi where he was executed by Aurangzeb in 1675 CE. The fort consists of a historical Gurdwara Sahib (a Sikh temple) named Gurdwara Sahib Patshai Nauvin. Tourists visit the Gurudwara on the occasion of the festival of Baisakhi on 13 April every year.

=== Qila Mubarak complex ===
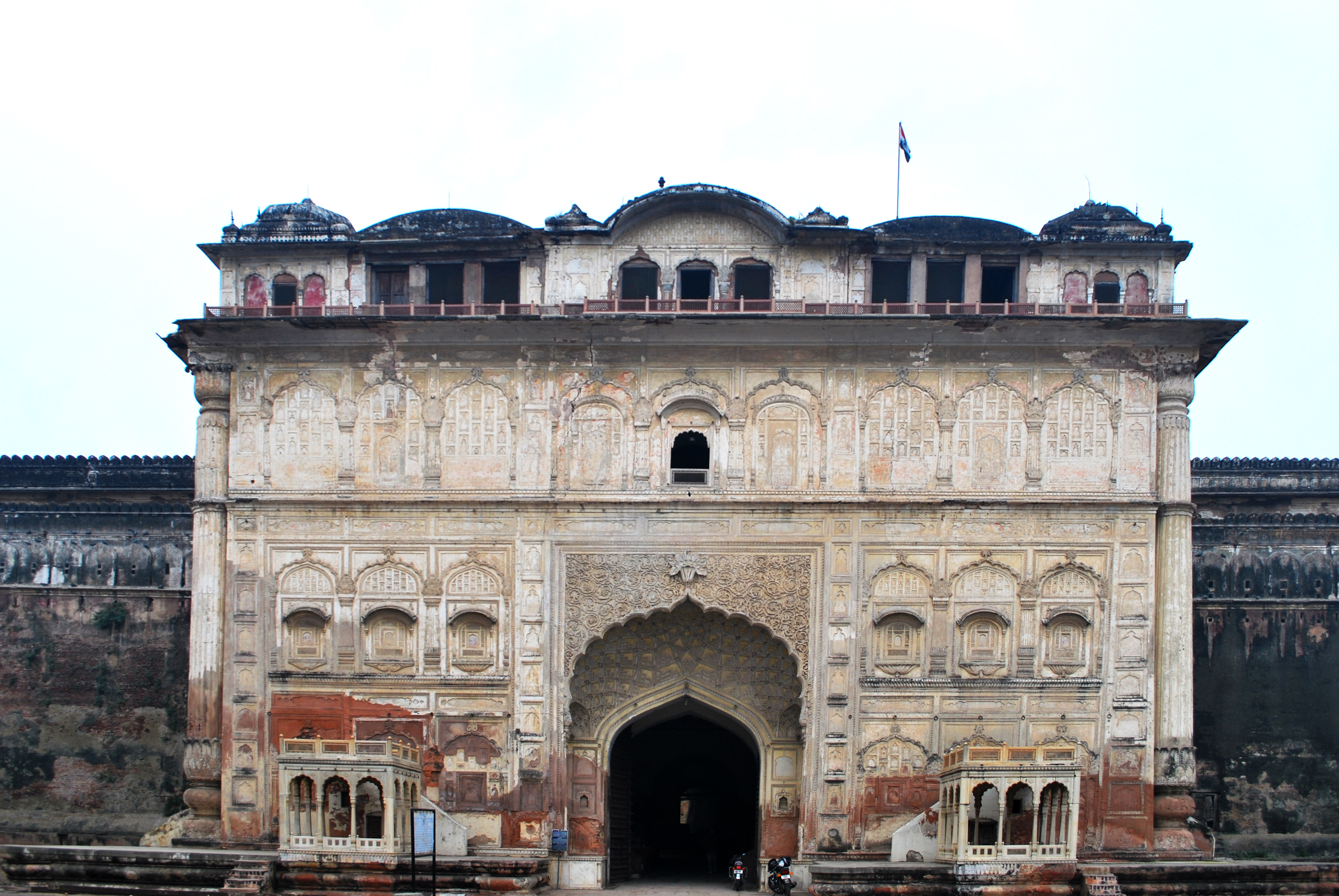
A gate of the Qila Mubarak in Patiala, built in the 18th century

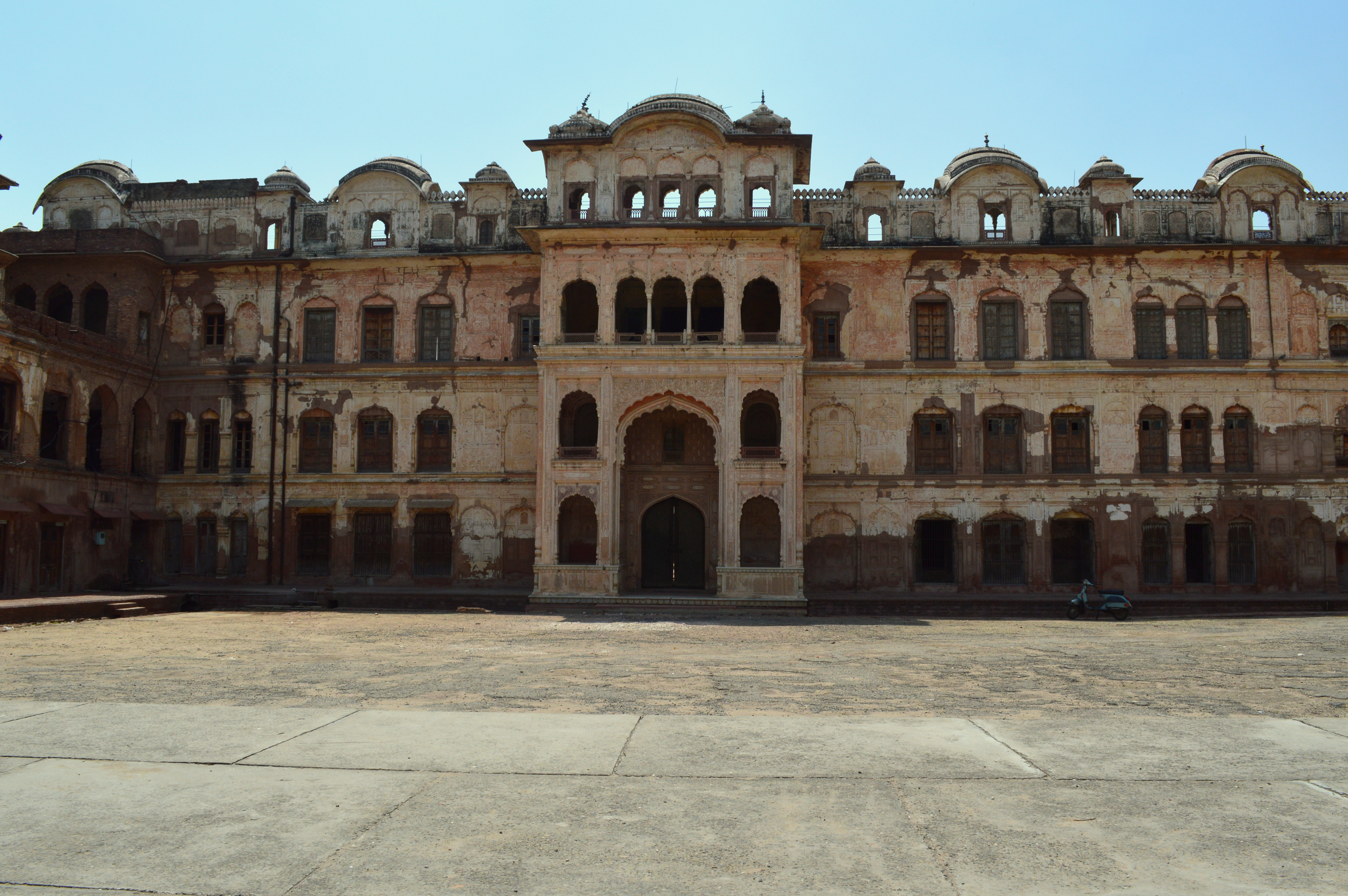
The Darshani Gate (the main gate of the Qila Mubarak), built in the 18th century. The city was built around the fort.

The Qila Mubarak complex stands on a 10-acre ground in the heart of the city and contains the main palace or Qila Androon (literally, 'inner fort'), the guesthouse or Ran Baas and the Darbar Hall. Outside the Qila are the Darshani Gate, a Shiva temple, and bazaar shops which border the streets that run around the Qila and sell precious ornaments, colourful hand-woven fabrics, 'jootis' and bright 'Paradis'.

It was the principal residence of the Patiala royals until the construction of Old Moti Bagh Palace.

In a tiny portion of the complex is a little British construction with Gothic arches, fireplaces made of marble, and built-in toilets perched on the Mughal Rajasthani roof. Every year it is decorated beautifully for the Heritage Festival. The property was later transformed into a hotel and is currently known as “Ran Baas The Palace.”

=== Sheesh Mahal ===
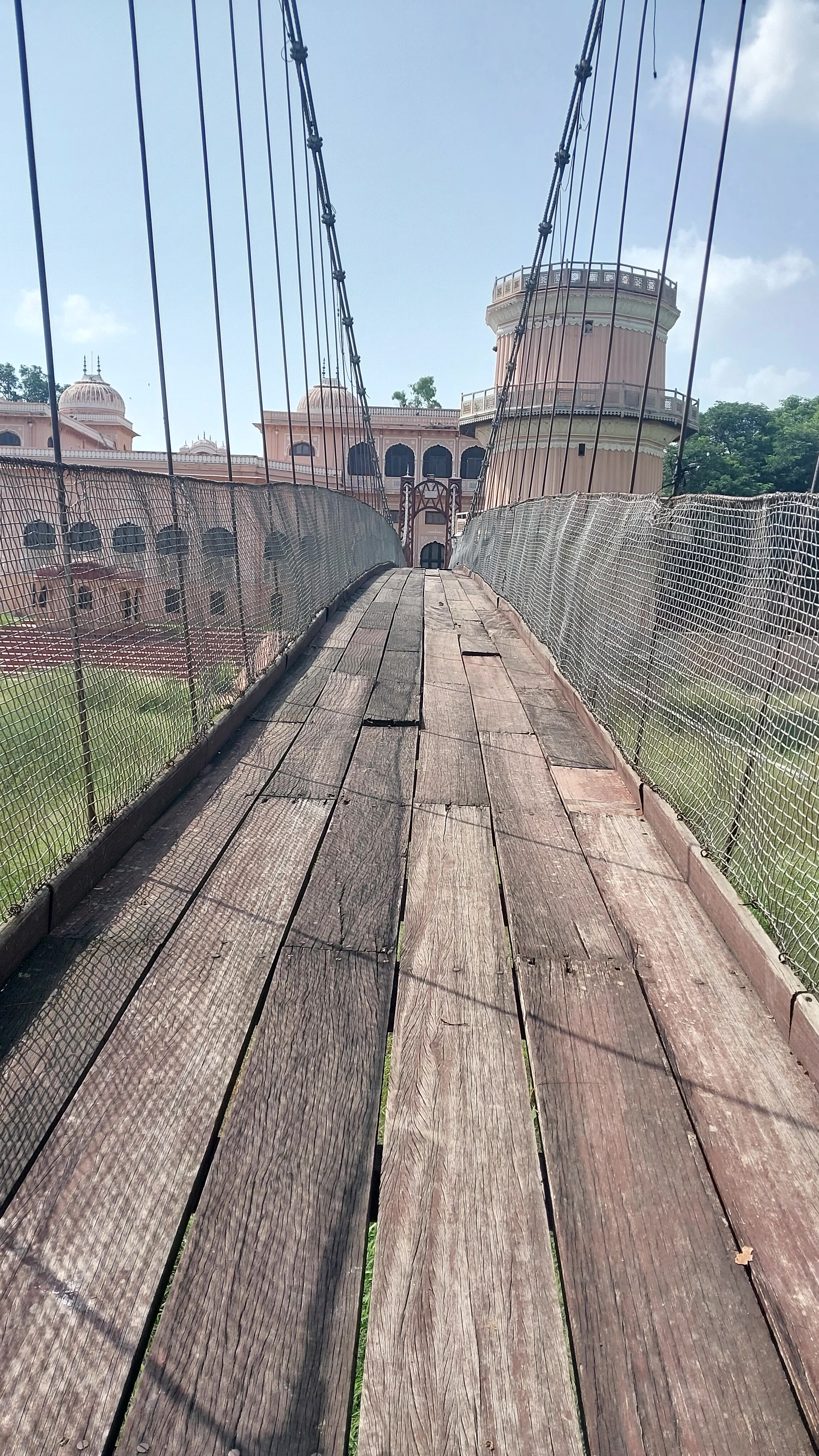
The suspension bridge at Sheesh Mahal, Patiala

A part of the Old Moti Bagh Palace built in the 19th century by the Maharajas is the famous Sheesh Mahal, literally meaning the Palace of Mirrors. The mahal contains a large number of frescoes, most of which were made under His Highness Maharaja Narinder Singh. Lakshman Jhula, a bridge built across the lake, is a famous attraction. A museum housing the largest collection of medals from the world collected by Maharaja Bhupinder Singh is located here.

=== Baradari Gardens ===
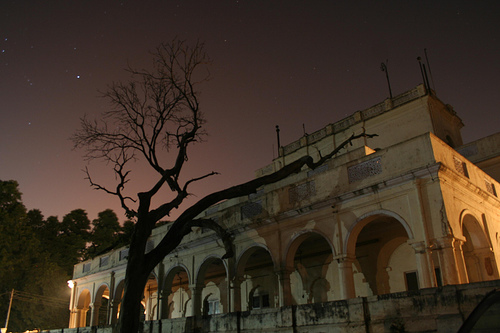
Rajindra Kothi, Patiala located in the Baradari Gardens, now a heritage hotel

The Baradari Gardens, the garden with 12 gates, are in the north of old Patiala city, just outside Sheranwala Gate. The garden complex, set up during the reign of Maharaja Rajindera Singh, has extensive vegetation of rare trees, shrubs, and flowers dotted with impressive Colonial buildings and a marble statue of Maharaja Rajindera Singh. It was built as a royal residence with a cricket stadium, a skating rink, and a small palace set in its heart named Rajindera Kothi. The gardens include a museum building with collections of Maharaja Ranjeet Singh.

After extensive restoration, it opened as a heritage hotel run by Neemrana Hotels group in 2009. It is Punjab's first heritage hotel. It is near Press Club Patiala which was established in 2006 and is now headed by Parveen Komal, president.

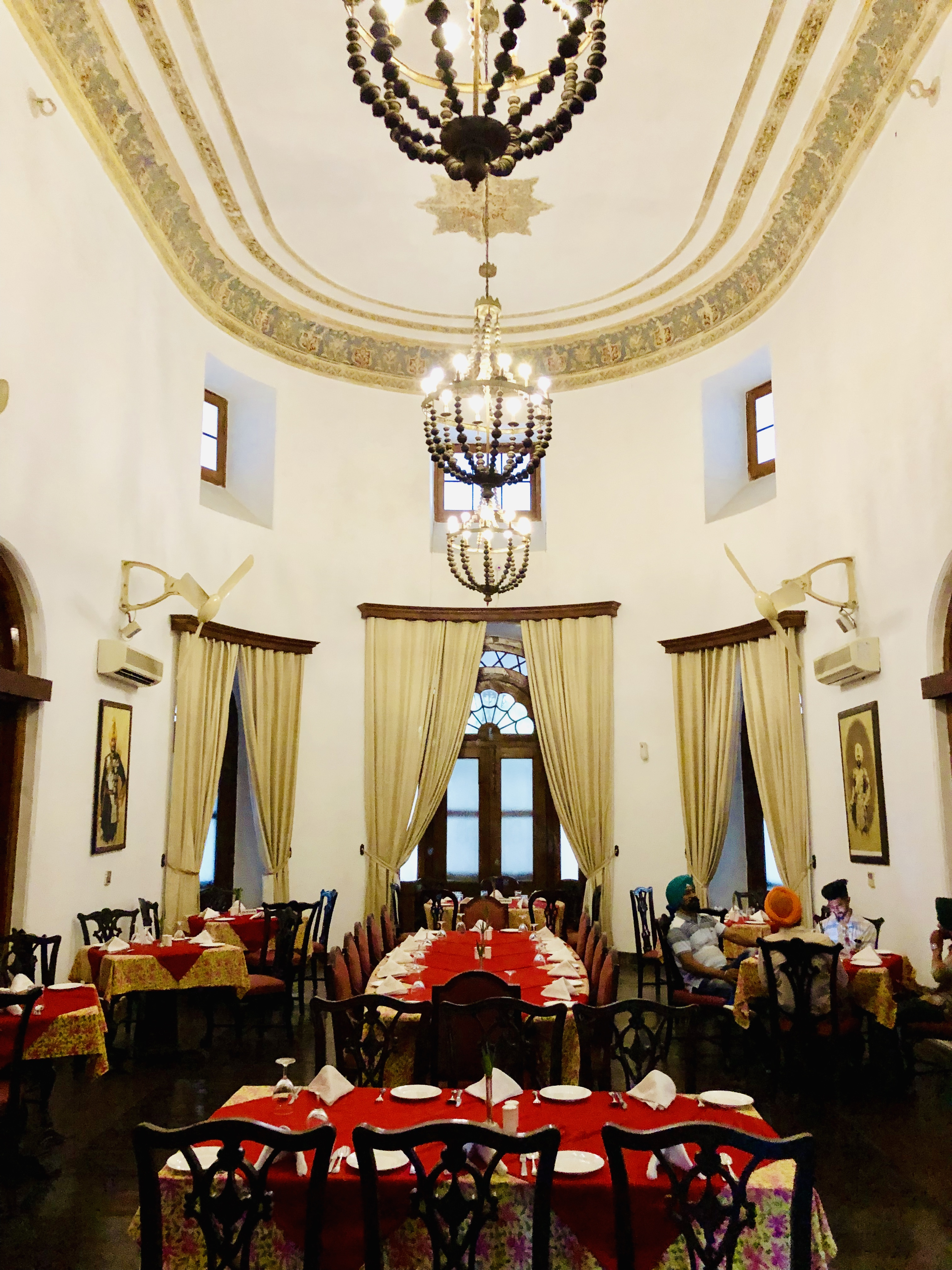
Royal Dining Hall

Press Club Patiala is situated at Barandari Garden Near 20 No. Railway Crossing. Headed by Mr. Parveen Komal President www.pressclubpatiala.com. It was established by Captain Amrinder Singh Chief Minister Of Punjab in 2006.

=== 12 Royal Gates of Patiala ===
- Darshani Gate - Main entrance of Quilla Mubarak
- Sanouri Gate
- Lahori Gate
- Sherawala Gate
- Sunami Gate
- Sirhindi Gate
- Ghalori Gate
- Safabadi Gate
- Top Khana Gate
- Nabha Gate
- Samania Gate
- Rajindera Gate

=== National Institute of Sports ===
Founded in 1961, Netaji Subhas National Institute of Sports (NIS) is Asia's largest sports institute. The institute was renamed Netaji Subhas National Institute of Sports in January 1973.

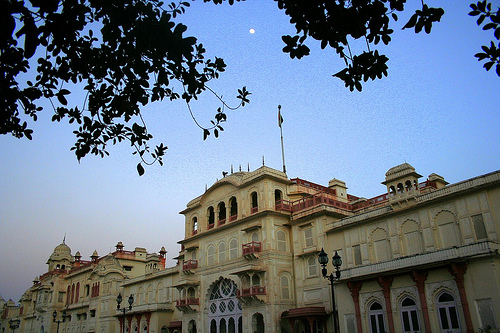
Netaji Subhash National Institute of Sports (NSNIS), Patiala

NIS is housed in the Old Moti Bagh palace of the erstwhile royal family of Patiala, which was purchased by the government of India after Indian Independence. Today, several sports memorabilia, like a has (doughnut-shaped exercise disc), weighing 95 kg, used by the Great Gama for squats, Major Dhyan Chand's gold medal from the 1928 Amsterdam Olympics, and PT Usha's 1986 Seoul Asiad shoes, are housed at the National Institute of Sports Museum.

=== Patiala Central State Library ===
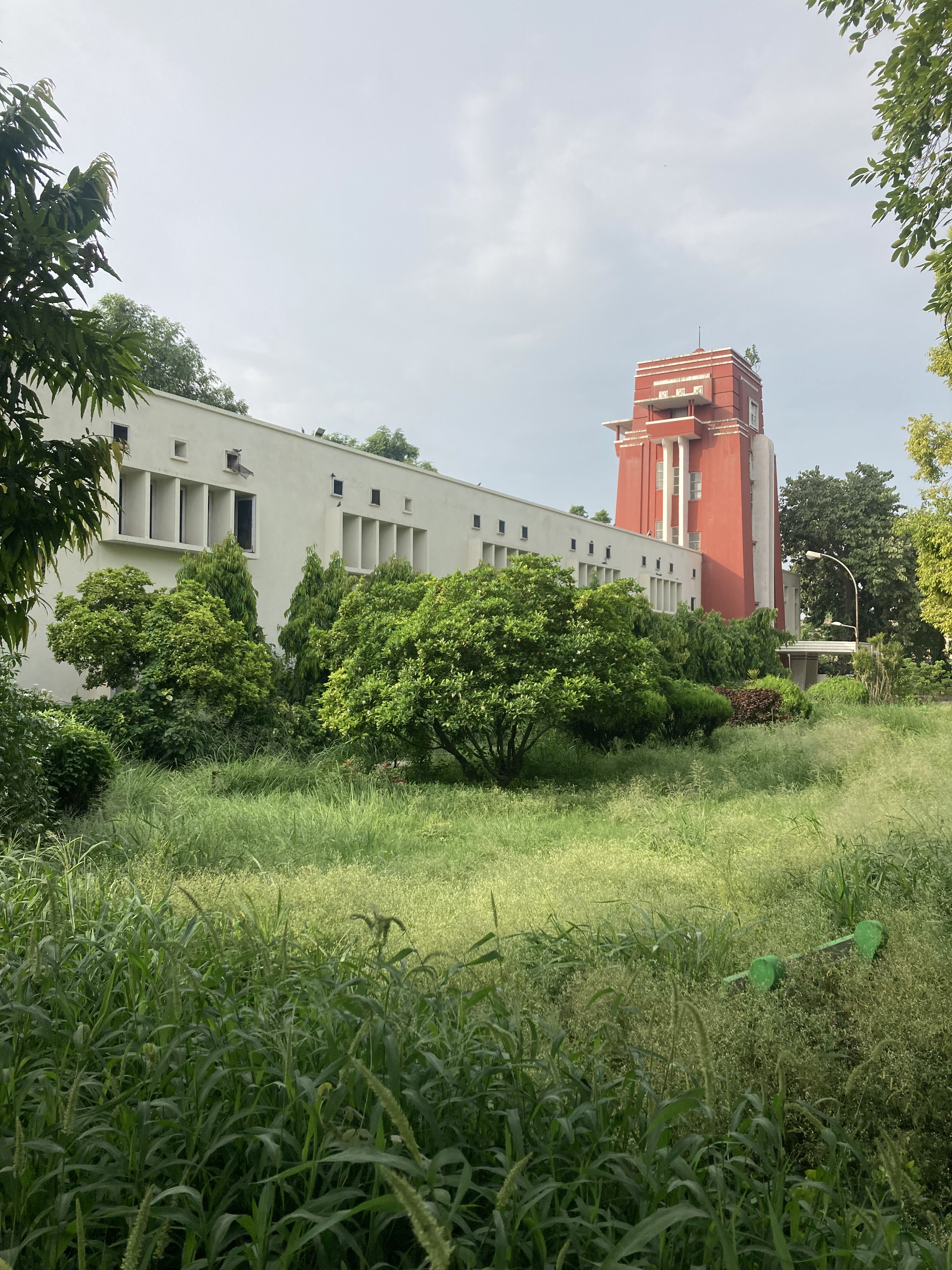
Central library Patiala 02

Patiala Central State Library is one of the oldest libraries in the state. It was opened in 1956. It is named after the former Punjab Chief Minister Giani Gurmukh Singh Musafir. The library has a rare collection of books. There are more than 135,000 books in the library. Out of it, more than 15,000 books are archival books and 3,000 rare manuscripts.

== Transportation ==
Patiala is connected to NH-44 Grand Trunk Road and NH-7 which help connect it with larger cities like Delhi.

Patiala has a well-established railway network. Patiala station, around 4 km from the city centre, connects Patiala to a variety of cities and regions.

Trains that stop at Patiala include:

- Amritsar to Mumbai CSTM express via Patiala.
- Hazur Sahib Nanded to Jammutawi Humsafar Express via Patiala
- Intercity Express, to Rishikesh, Delhi, Ambala, Bhatinda, Fazilka, Sri Ganganagar and other cities.

Patiala has a small domestic airport, Patiala Airport located about 5 km from the city center. This airport handles limited air traffic, mainly for general aviation, and does not operate regular commercial flights.

The nearest international airport is Chandigarh Airport with both domestic and international flights connecting to cities like Delhi, Mumbai, and Dubai.

== Culture and traditions ==
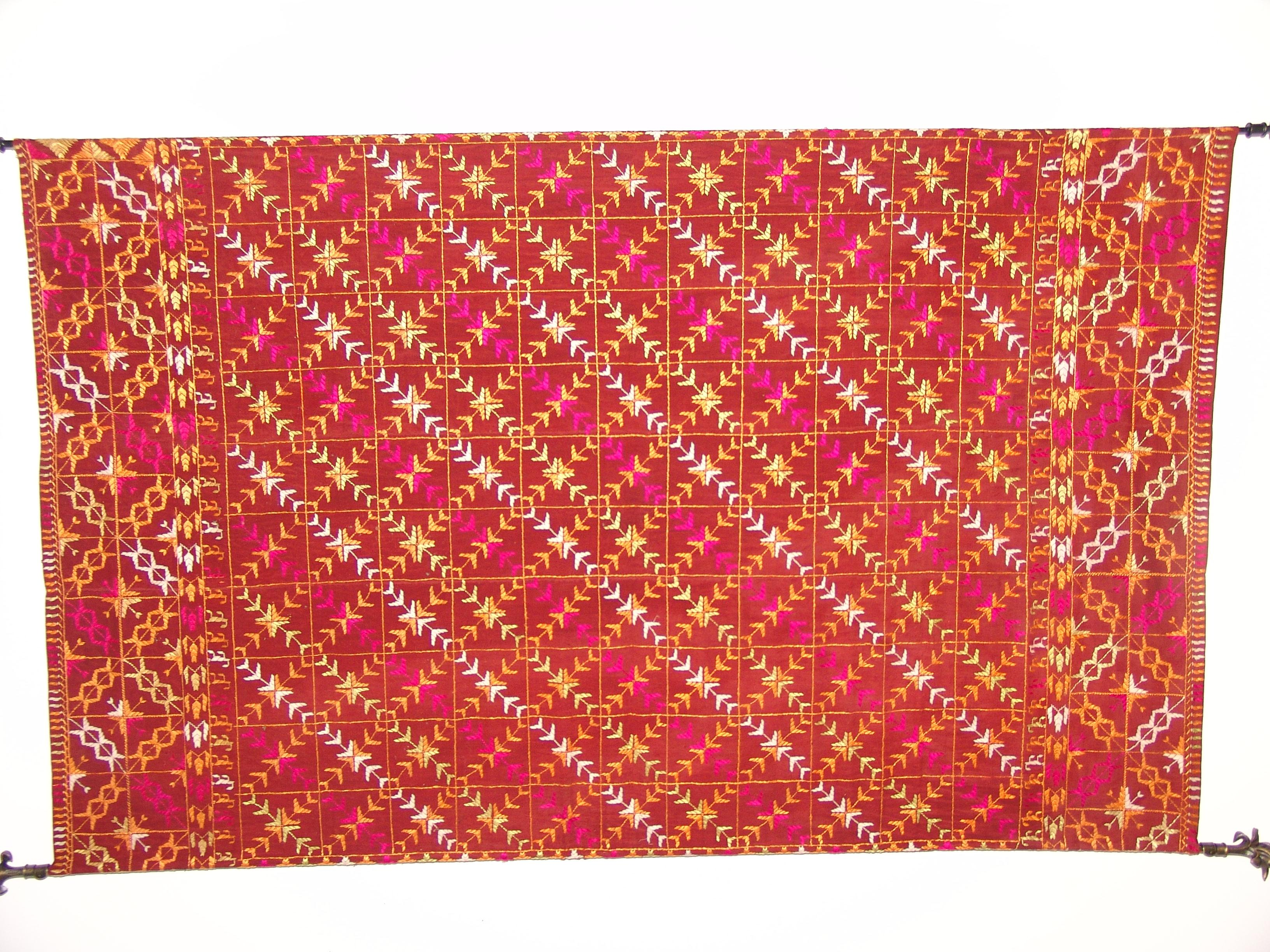
Phulkari from Patiala

Patiala's sway over the Malwa area extended beyond merely political influence. Patiala was equally the set of religious and cultural life. Educationally, Patiala was at the forefront. Patiala was the first town in this part of the country to have a degree college – the Mohindra College – in 1870.

Patiala has seen the evolution of a distinct style of architecture. Borrowing from the Rajput style, its beauty and elegance are molded according to the local traditions.

With the active patronage of the Maharajas of Patiala, a well-established style of Hindustan I music called the "Patiala gharana" came into existence and has held its own up to the present times. This school of music has had several famous musicians, many of whom came to Patiala after the disintegration of the Mughal Court at Delhi in the 18th century. At the turn of the century, Ustad Ali Bux was the most renowned exponent of this Gharana. Later, his sons Ustad Akhtar Hussain Khan and Ustad Bade Ghulam Ali Khan achieved worldwide fame and brought glory to the Patiala Gharana.

After the partition of British India, the Muslim community was massacred or forced to flee the city en masse to Pakistan. At the same time, many Hindu and Sikh refugees migrated from Pakistan and settled on the Muslim properties in Patiala. The then Maharaja of Patiala, His Highness Yadavindra Singh, Rajpramukh of PEPSU with his wife Her Highness Maharani Mohinder Kaur organized a large number of camps and worked tirelessly for the people.

== Education ==
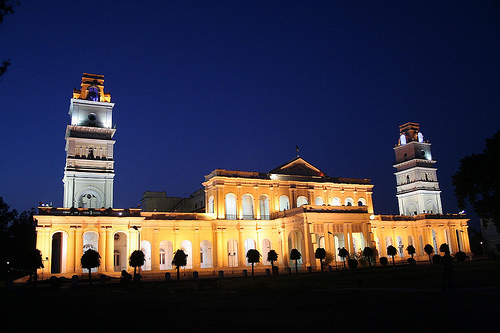
Mohindra College, Patiala

Since Indian independence in 1947, Patiala has emerged as a major education centre in the state of Punjab. The city houses the Thapar Institute of Engineering and Technology, LM Thapar School of Management, Jagat Guru Nanak Dev Punjab State Open University, Punjab Sports University, Punjabi University, Rajiv Gandhi National University of Law, General Shivdev Singh Diwan Gurbachan Singh Khalsa College, Government Mohindra College, Aryans College of Law, Multani Mal Modi College, Government Medical College, Patiala, Thapar Polytechnic College, and Govt. Bikram College of Commerce, one of the premier commerce colleges in northern India.

Netaji Subhas National Institute of Sports, Patiala is a sports hub of north India. Rajiv Gandhi National University of Law, Patiala was the first national law school of the north region established under the Punjab Government Act of 2006.

List of universities in Patiala:

Name	Type of university
Punjabi University	State University
Thapar Institute of Engineering and Technology	Deemed University
Rajiv Gandhi National University of Law	National University
Punjab Sports University	State University
Jagat Guru Nanak Dev Punjab State Open University	State University
Chitkara University	Private University

Notable schools:

- The British Co-Ed High School
- Our Lady of Fatima Convent Sec. School, Patiala

== Sports ==
Patiala is home to numerous inter-state sporting teams in tournaments like Black Elephants. The city has facilities for cricket, swimming, shooting, skating and hockey. The city has stadiums such as Dhruv Pandove Ground, Raja Bhalinder Stadium, Yadavindra Sports Stadium (YPS) and National Institute of Sports.

The latest addition to sports is the state-of-the-art shotgun shooting ranges housing New Moti Bagh Gun Club in village Maine. Founded by the royal family of Patiala, these ranges are home to the Indian Shotgun Shooting team who routinely trains here. It has recently hosted the 2nd Asian Shotgun Championship.

== Suburbs of Patiala ==
- Nabha (Municipal Council) 25 km (16 mi)
- Rajpura (Municipal Council) 27 km (17 mi)
- Samana (Municipal Council) 27 km (17 mi)

== See also ==
- Patiala and East Punjab States Union
- Chandigarh
- Bir Bunerheri Wildlife Sanctuary, wildlife sanctuary near the city
- Mohali
- Panchkula
- Rajpura
- Fatehgarh Sahib
- Bassi Pathana
- Mandi Gobindgarh
