= Lehal, Patiala =

Lehal was a village in Punjab, India, that is now part of the city of Patiala.
