= Lehal, Jalandhar =

Lehal
- Village
- Location in Punjab, India Lehal (India)
- Coordinates: 31.1564731°N 75.8647002°E
- Country: India
- State: Punjab
- District: Jalandhar

Government
  - Type: Panchayat raj
  - Body: Gram panchayat
- Elevation: 240 m (790 ft)

Population (2011)
  - Total: 1,114
- Sex ratio 559/555 ♂/♀

Languages
  - Official: Punjabi
- Time zone: UTC+5:30 (IST)
- PIN: 144502
- Telephone: 01826
- ISO 3166 code: IN-PB
- Vehicle registration: PB- 08
- Post office: Dosanjh Kalan
- Website: jalandhar.nic.in

Lehal is a village in Jalandhar district of Punjab State, India. It is located 7.3 km away from postal head office in Dosanjh Kalan, 23.9 km from Phillaur, 37.8 km from district headquarter Jalandhar and 121 km from state capital Chandigarh. The village is administrated by a sarpanch who is an elected representative of village as per Panchayati raj (India).

== Demography ==
=== Caste background ===
Most of the people are from Forward Caste including Nanakpanthi Jātts which constitutes around 65.31% of total population in Lehal village of Babar-Akalis Patronage.

== Transport ==
Goraya railway station is the nearest train station; however, Phagwara Junction train station is 15.8 km away from the village. The village is 54.6 km away from domestic airport in Ludhiana and the nearest international airport is located in Chandigarh also Sri Guru Ram Dass Jee International Airport is the second nearest airport which is 132 km away in Amritsar.
