= Rajpura =

- City
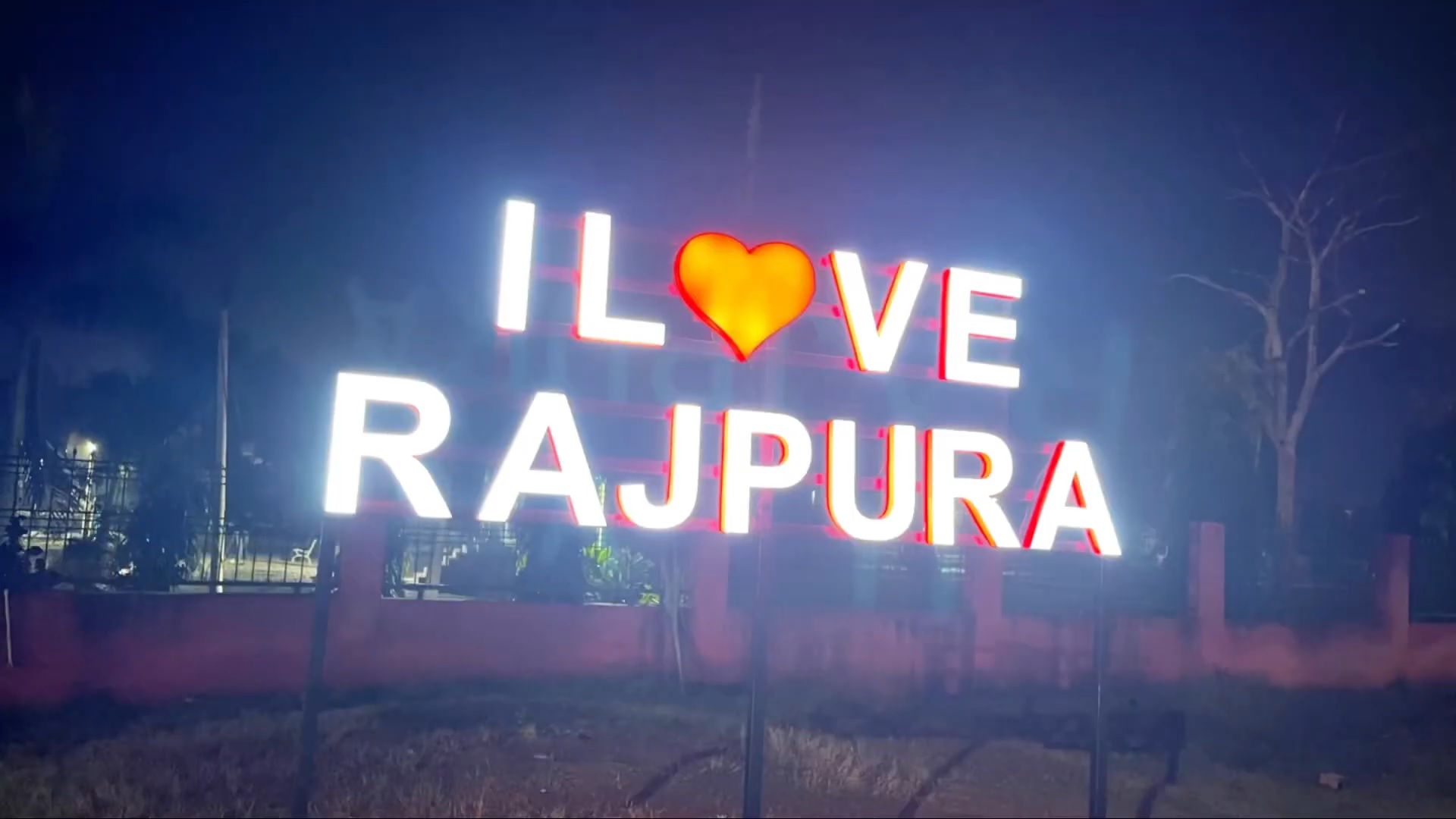
- Glowing sign of Rajpura City

- Location in Punjab, India Rajpura (India)
- Coordinates: 30.484°N 76.594°E
- Country: India
- State: Punjab
- District: Patiala
- Founder: Suri dynasty

Government
  - Type: Municipal corporation
  - Body: Aam Aadmi Party
  - City Council: Members: Neena Mittal – MLA

Area
  - Total: 76.08 km^{2} (29.375 sq mi)
- Elevation: 259 m (850 ft)

Population (2011)
  - Total: 112,193
  - Density: 1,474.7/km^{2} (3,819.3/sq mi)

Languages
  - Official: Punjabi
  - Native: Puadhi
- Time zone: UTC+5:30 (IST)
- PIN: 140401
- Telephone code: 01762
- Vehicle registration: PB-39
- Sex ratio: 1000:889 ♂/♀

Rajpura (Punjabi pronunciation: [ɾədʒpʊɾɑː]) is a city and a municipal council in Patiala district in the Indian state of Punjab, India, situated along the border of the Indian state of Haryana. It is located 26 km from Patiala city, towards East from district headquarter. It is a Tehsil headquarter, here the Mini-Secretariat is an administrative building that houses various government offices, including those related to the judiciary. The Rajpura Mini-Secretariat serves as an important hub for various government functions, including services for the sub-tehsil Ghanaur, providing residents with essential services without the need to travel to the district headquarter. Rajpura is the largest tehsil of the district.

As of 2025, Rajpura is undergoing a major industrial and commercial expansion, transforming into North India's premier manufacturing and logistics hub. This growth is driven by a 1,099-acre Integrated Manufacturing Cluster (IMC) near NH-44 and NH-64, which represents a ₹7,500 crore investment projected to create over 64,000 jobs. Additionally, the region's development is accelerated by large-scale private estates like SBP SIEL, a ₹1,500 crore JSW Steel facility, and a major green cement plant.

== Geography ==
Rajpura is located at 30.48°N 76.6°E. It has an average elevation of 259 metres (849 feet). Rajpura is situated nearly 38 km south west of Chandigarh, the capital city of Punjab. Besides being an important industrial town of Punjab, it also has historical importance.

Rajpura is surrounded by a number of major cities like Patiala (22 km west), Ambala (20 km south) and Ludhiana (83 km north). Rajpura acts as middle point between Amritsar and Delhi on National Highway 44 as these cities are 225 km away from Rajpura in opposite directions.

== Demographics ==
=== Religion ===
Religions in Rajpura
| Religion | Percent |
| Hindus | 70.60% |
| Sikh | 27.51% |
| Muslims | 1.39% |
| Christians | 0.28% |
| Jains | 0.08% |
| Buddhist | 0.00% |
| Others | 0.01% |
Includes not stated 0.11%.

In the 2011 India census, Rajpura Municipal Council had a population of 391,011 including 206,801 (52.89%) males and 184,210 (47.11%) females giving a Sex Ratio of 891. There were 457,82 children aged 0–6 i.e. 10.7% of the total population. There was a literacy rate of 86.42% (males 89.83%, females 82.70%) much higher than the state average of 75.84%.

=== Language ===
Languages of Rajpura (2011)
1. Punjabi (60.7%)
2. Hindi (20.3%)
3. Saraiki (18.5%)
4. Others (0.56%)

At the time of the 2011 census, 60.66% of the population spoke Punjabi, 20.27% Hindi and 18.51% Saraiki as their first language.

== History ==
The history of Rajpura records that Sher Shah Suri, founder of the Sur Empire, constructed a "Sarai" (inn) in the area between 1540 and 1545. The structure was built to accommodate his army during their travels through the region. The Sarai expanded rapidly from the 19th century and was briefly the largest Administrative Sub-division in Patiala district. This Sarai houses the officers of Sub-Divisional Magistrate.

=== Municipal Council ===
As the city continued to prosper during the 19th century, Rajpura was designated as a tehsil encompassing 252 villages under its municipal limits and remains the largest tehsil in the district. The city is also home to the SOS Children's Village, the only orphanage center of its kind in northern India.

==== Divisions ====
Rajpura city can be divided into three divisions:

- The Old Rajpura constitutes the city's historical district, with narrow lanes, traditional housing, and cultural landmarks.
- The Focal Point serves as the industrial zone, containing various manufacturing units and factories.
- The Rajpura township is a planned residential and commercial development established post-independence to rehabilitate migrants from the Bahawalpur province of Pakistan. In 1951, the city's population increased significantly due to this migration.

== Constituency ==
Rajpura is constituency No. 111 of Punjab Legislative Assembly. It comes under the Patiala (Lok Sabha constituency). As per the voter list of 2019, there are 173947 electorates and 189 polling stations. The term of the Legislative assembly is five years.

== Economy ==
Rajpura located southwest of Chandigarh, is blend of agriculture and industry services.

=== Agriculture ===
Agriculture has traditionally been the backbone of rajpura economy, Primary crops wheat and rice. Along with dairy farming. A substantial portion of the population is involved in farming and sales of related materials.

=== Industry ===
Rajpura is an industrial town. There are number of large-scale industries like Hindustan Unilever HUL (formerly known as HLL). and a large number of small-scale industries. In small-scale industries, Rajpura is a hub of steel works and machines industry.

==== Power Plant ====
Nabha Power Limited, which runs a 1400 MW (2x700) supercritical thermal power plant at Rajpura, owned and operated by Larsen & Toubro.

==== Warehousing and logistics hub ====
Rajpura has been known for its quality furniture and several well-known brands have their manufacturing plants located here. Being one of the largest industrial hubs of Punjab, Rajpura is crucial location from supply chain and logistics perspective. Rajpura is gradually emerging as a warehousing and logistics hub of Punjab.

== Education ==
Notable schools, colleges, universities and institutes in Rajpura include:

=== Colleges ===
- Aryans College of Law
- Chitkara University, Punjab
- Swami Vivekanand Institute of Engineering & Technology

== Places of interest ==
=== Swayambhu Temple ===
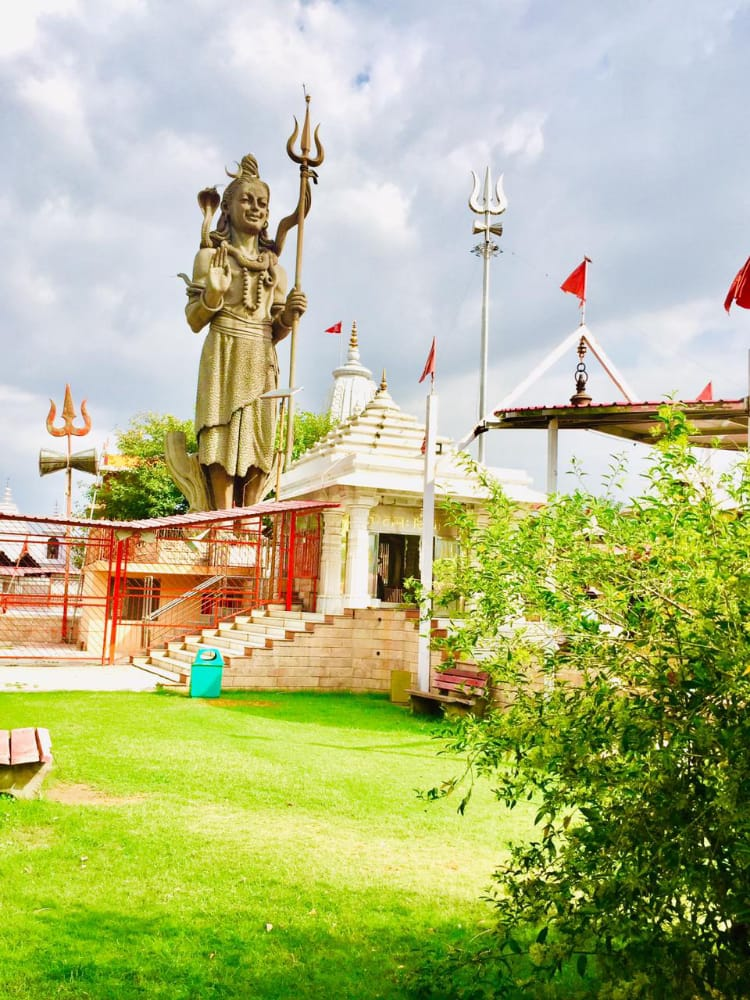
Swayambhu Temple, Nalas entrance with the Lord Shiva sculpture depicting

The temple is dedicated to Lord Shiva and is located in Nalas village. Here the self-born Lingam of Lord Shiv is present, which is why it is called Swayambhu. Since the 15th century, the temple has been home to Sadhu's. There is also a 65 ft-tall sculpture of Lord Shiva at the entrance of the temple and the height of the temple is above 100 ft. Every year, it is decorated beautifully for the Maha Shivaratri Festival.

=== St. Thomas Catholic Church ===
St. Thomas Catholic Church is a Roman Catholic parish located in Rajpura, Patiala district, Punjab. It falls under the Diocese of Simla–Chandigarh and serves as one of the primary Christian worship centres in the city. The church is dedicated to St. Thomas, whose feast is celebrated annually on 3 July.

== Transport ==
=== Road ===
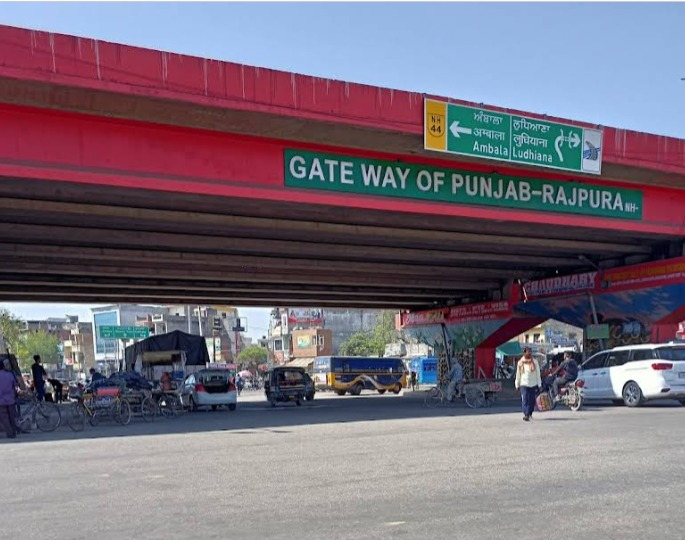
Middle Point between Amritsar and Delhi

Rajpura is situated at the junction of National Highway No. 1 which runs from New Delhi to Attari in Punjab and National Highway 64 which runs from Chandigarh to Dabwali, making Rajpura a good distribution centre. Rajpura is regarded as 'Gateway of Punjab' as all road and rail transport needs to touch Rajpura for the routes going to other major cities of Punjab as well as Jammu & Kashmir.

Intercity bus travel is provided by PEPSU Road Transport Corporation, Chandigarh Transport Undertaking and Haryana Roadways.

=== Rail ===
Rajpura Junction is the first Railway Junction in Punjab while coming from Delhi side. The rail lines are diverted from here to 2 major lines catering to Punjab. One is to Amritsar and Jammu & Kashmir; and the other towards Patiala, Bathinda and Rajasthan.

=== Air ===
The nearest major airport is Chandigarh Airport (IXC / VICG). This airport has domestic flights from Chandigarh and is 28.13 km from the center of Rajpura via NH 7 and NH 205A.

== Climate ==
Rajpura has the following average temperature and precipitation

Climate data for Rajpura
| Month | Jan | Feb | Mar | Apr | May | Jun | Jul | Aug | Sep | Oct | Nov | Dec | Year |
|---|---|---|---|---|---|---|---|---|---|---|---|---|---|
| Mean daily maximum °C (°F) | 19 (66) | 21 (69) | 26 (78) | 34 (94) | 38 (101) | 39 (103) | 34 (94) | 33 (91) | 33 (92) | 32 (89) | 26 (79) | 21 (69) | 30 (85) |
| Mean daily minimum °C (°F) | 2 (35) | 4 (40) | 13 (55) | 18 (65) | 23 (73) | 26 (79) | 26 (79) | 24 (76) | 23 (74) | 17 (63) | 11 (52) | 7 (45) | 16 (61) |
| Average precipitation mm (inches) | 20 (0.80) | 38 (1.50) | 30 (1.20) | 20 (0.80) | 20 (0.80) | 61 (2.40) | 229 (9.00) | 188 (7.40) | 86 (3.40) | 5.1 (0.20) | 13 (0.50) | 20 (0.80) | 730.1 (28.8) |
