= Verka =

Verka may refer to:

== People ==
- Raj Kumar Verka (born 1963), Indian politician
- Verka Aleksieva (born 1943), Bulgarian rower
- Verka Borisova (born 1955), Bulgarian volleyball player
- Verka Serduchka (born 1973), a Ukrainian comedian, actor, and singer
- Verka Siderova (1926–2025), Bulgarian folk singer

== Other uses ==
- Verka, a folk metal band in the music of North Macedonia
- Verka (brand), a milk brand in India
- Verka Town, a suburb in the Amritsar district of Punjab state, India
  - Verka Junction railway station
