= Ramdass =

- City
- Location in Punjab, India Ramdass (India)
- Coordinates: 31.9852°N 74.9095°E
- Country: India
- State: Punjab
- District: Amritsar
- Tehsil: Ajnala

Government
  - Type: Democratic
  - Body: Indian Republic

Population (2011)
  - Total: 6,398

Languages
  - Official: Punjabi, Hindi
- Time zone: UTC+5:30 (IST)
- Postal code: 143603

Ramdass is a city, near Amritsar city and a municipal council in Amritsar district in the Indian state of Punjab. It is situated on the bank of Ravi river. It is a border area.

It is an ancient holy city. It is nearly 50 K.M. far from Amritsar. It is connected through railway line (Amritsar - Verka - Fatehgarh Churrian - Ramdass - Gurdaspur - Dera Baba Nanak) and all weather concrete road (Amritsar - Ajnala - Ramdass - Dera Baba Nanak and Amritsar - Majitha - Fatehgarh Churrian - Ramdass). Dera Baba Nanak (Kartarpur Corridor, Pakistan) is 14 km from Ramdass.

In ancient times Baba Budha (ਬਾਬਾ ਬੁੱਢਾ ਜੀ) ji lived here. His last cremation was done here by Guru Hargobind Ji, sixth Sikh Guru. In His remembrance two Gurudwaras are built here named Gurudwara Tappasthan (ਗੁਰੂਦੁਆਰਾ ਤਪ ਅਸਥਾਨ) and Gurudwara Smadha (ਗੁਰੂਦੁਆਰਾ ਸਮਾਧਾਂ).

== Demographics ==
As of 2001 India census, Ramdass had a population of 5790. Males constitute 53% of the population and females 47%. Ramdass has an average literacy rate of 62%, higher than the national average of 59.5%: male literacy is 67%, and female literacy is 56%. In Ramdass, 14% of the population is under 6 years of age. Ramdass city belongs to the Jat Sikh Bal clan.

The table below shows the population of different religious groups in Ramdass city and their gender ratio, as of 2011 census.

Population by religious groups in Ramdass city, 2011 census
Religion	Total	Female	Male	Gender ratio
Sikh	4,092	1,951	2,141	911
Hindu	2,204	1,055	1,149	918
Christian	18	9	9	1000
Muslim	1	1	0	--
Not stated	83	46	37	1324
Total	6,398	3,062	3,336	917
