= Amritsar =

Metropolis in Punjab, India

Amritsar Amritsar (Punjabi)
- Metropolis
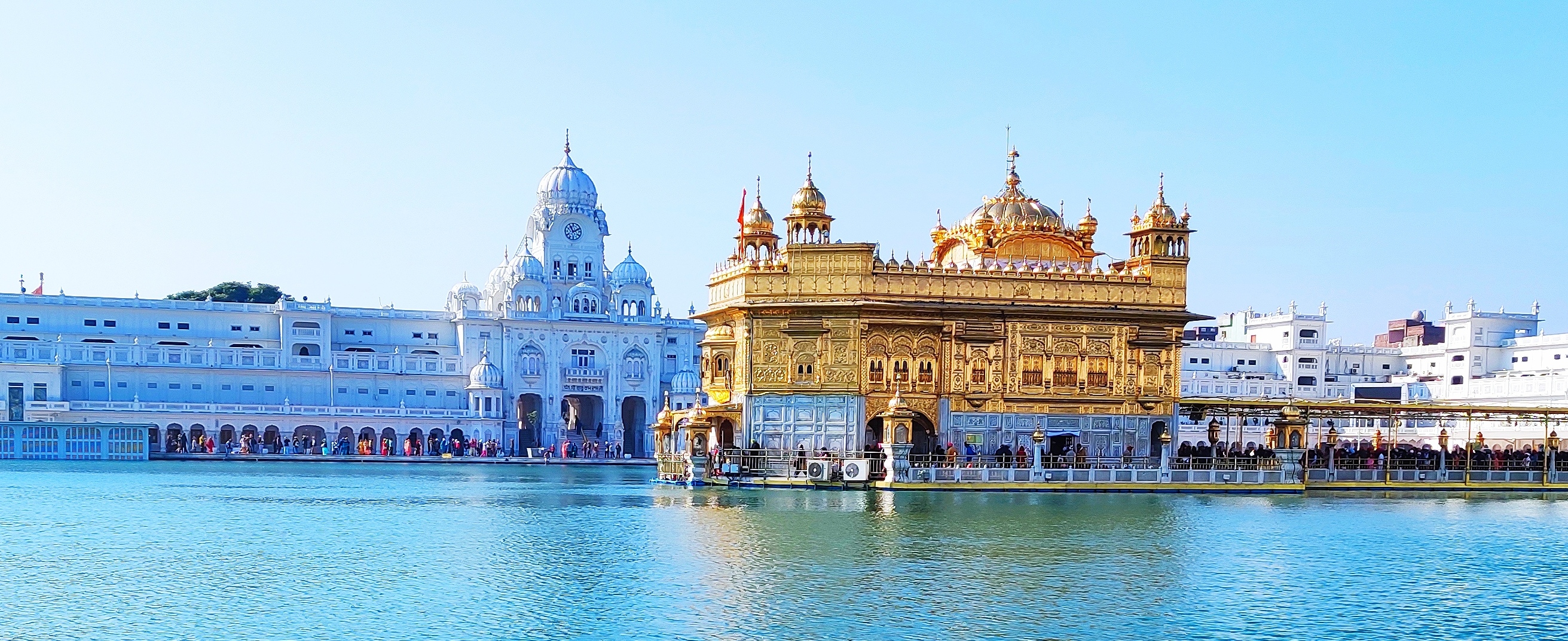
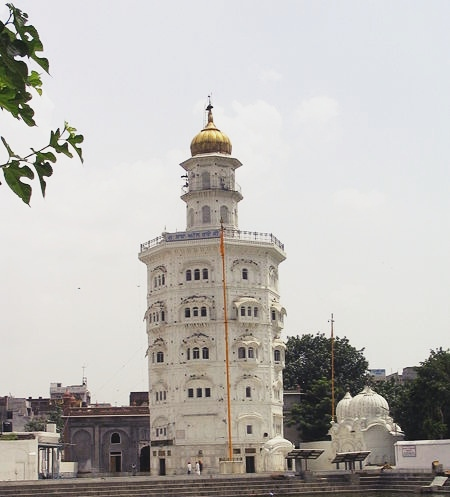
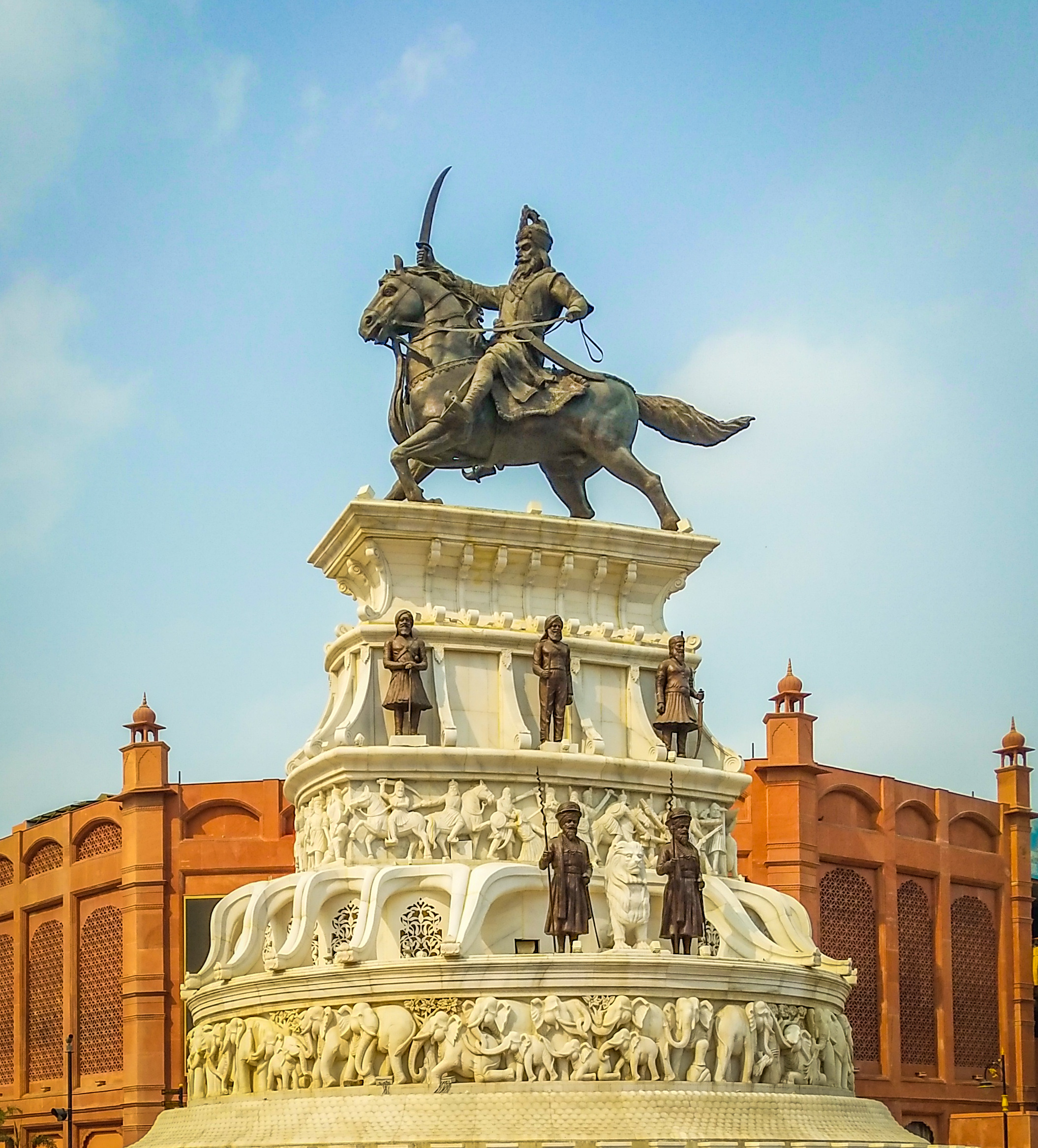
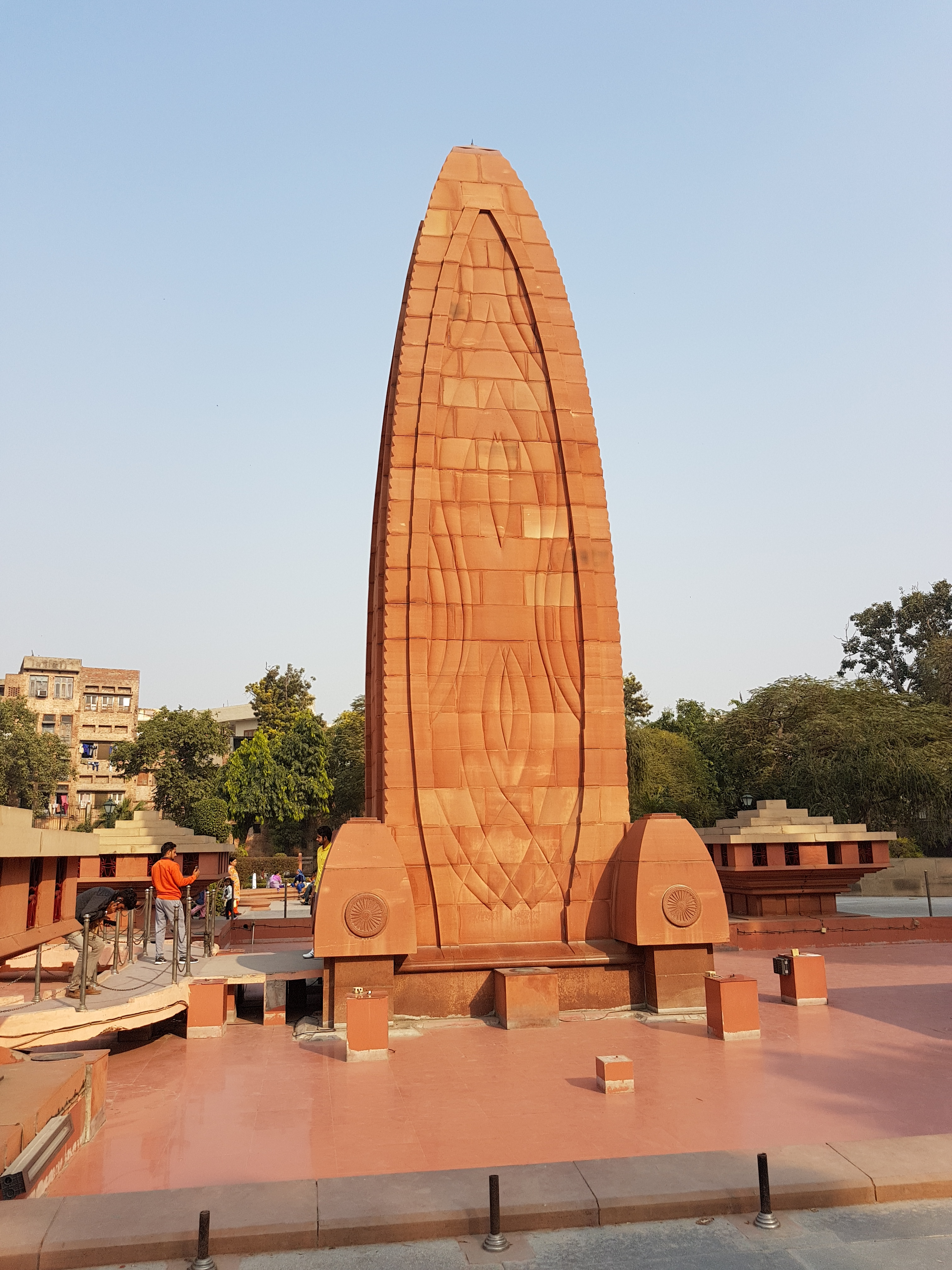
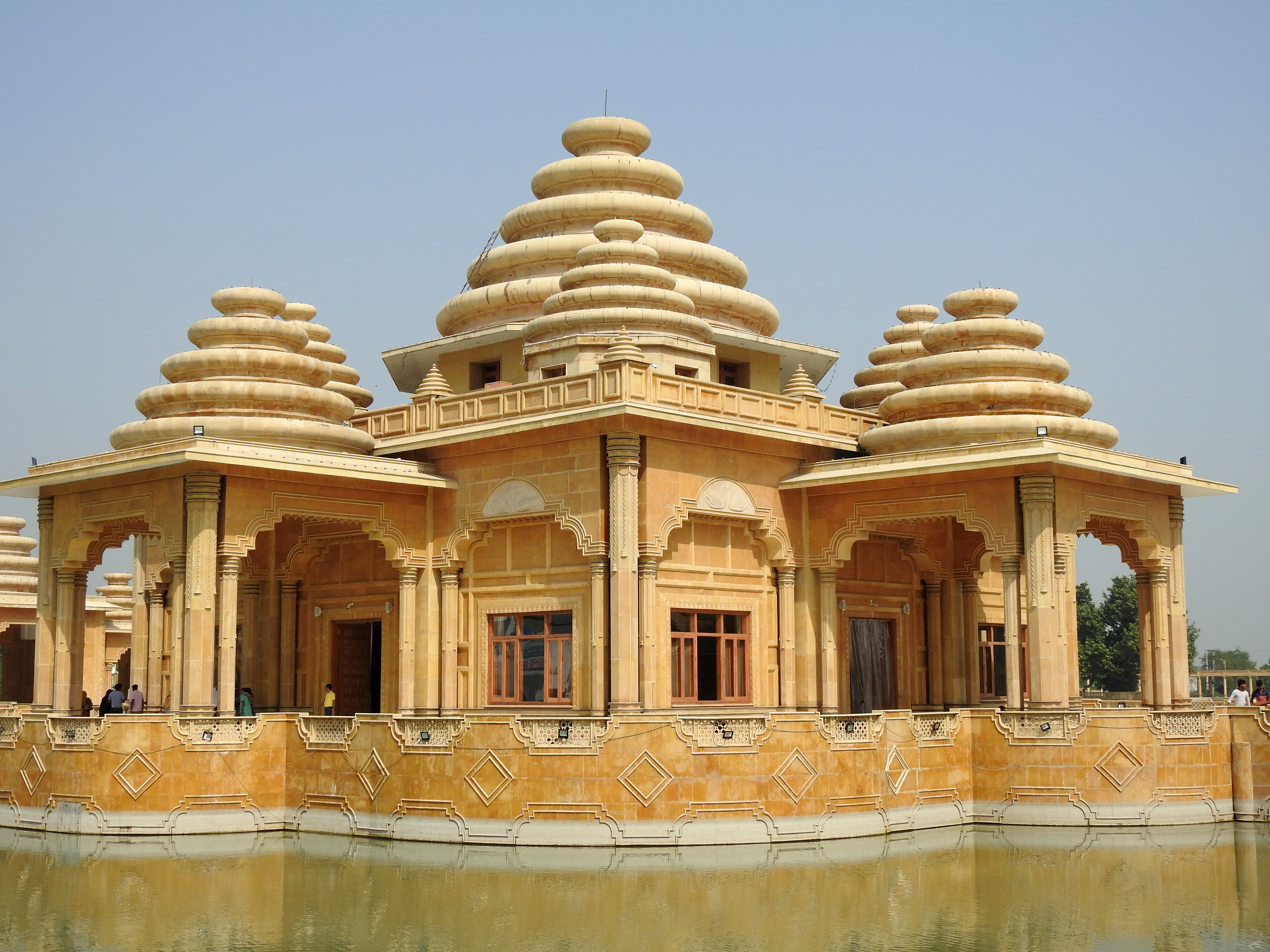
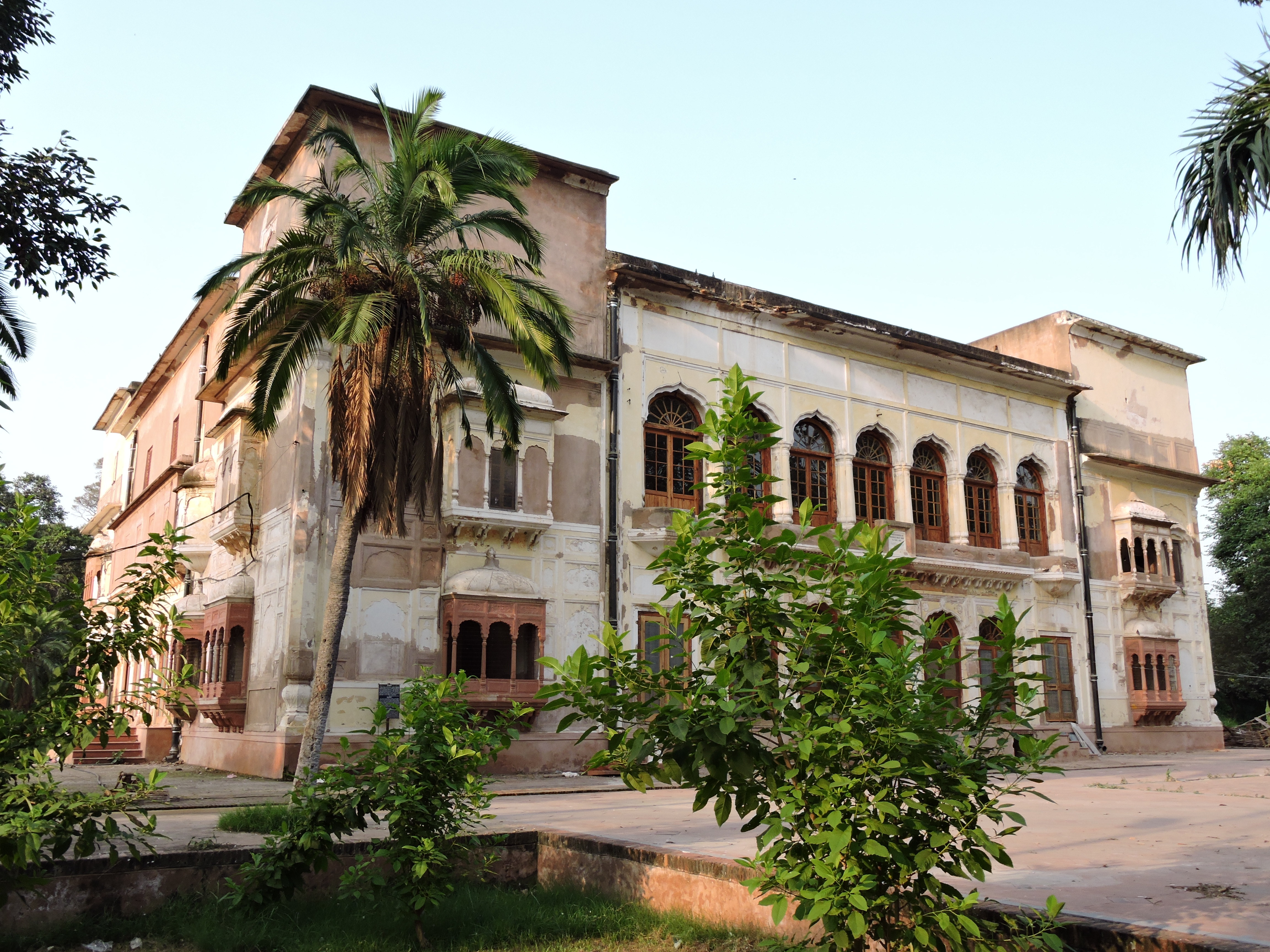
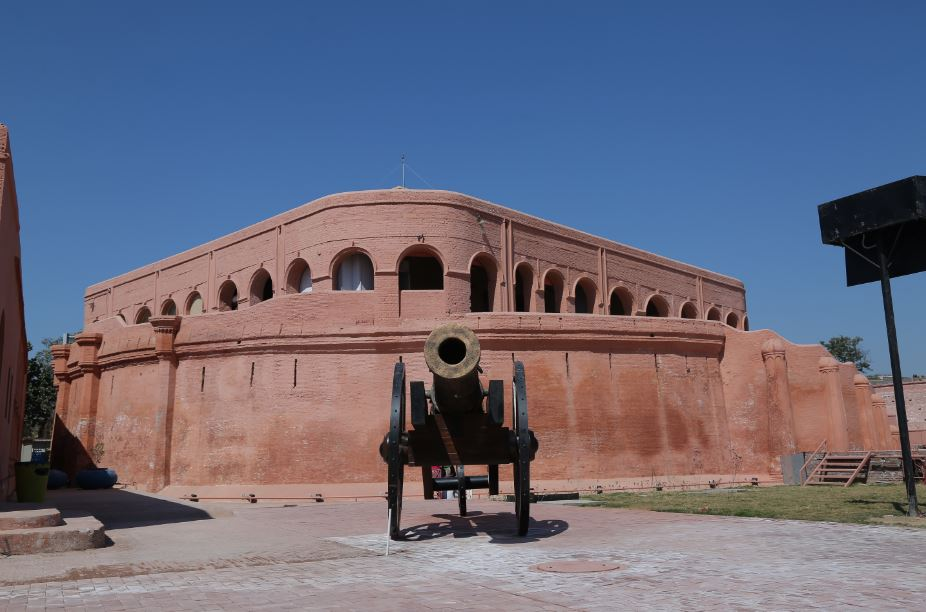
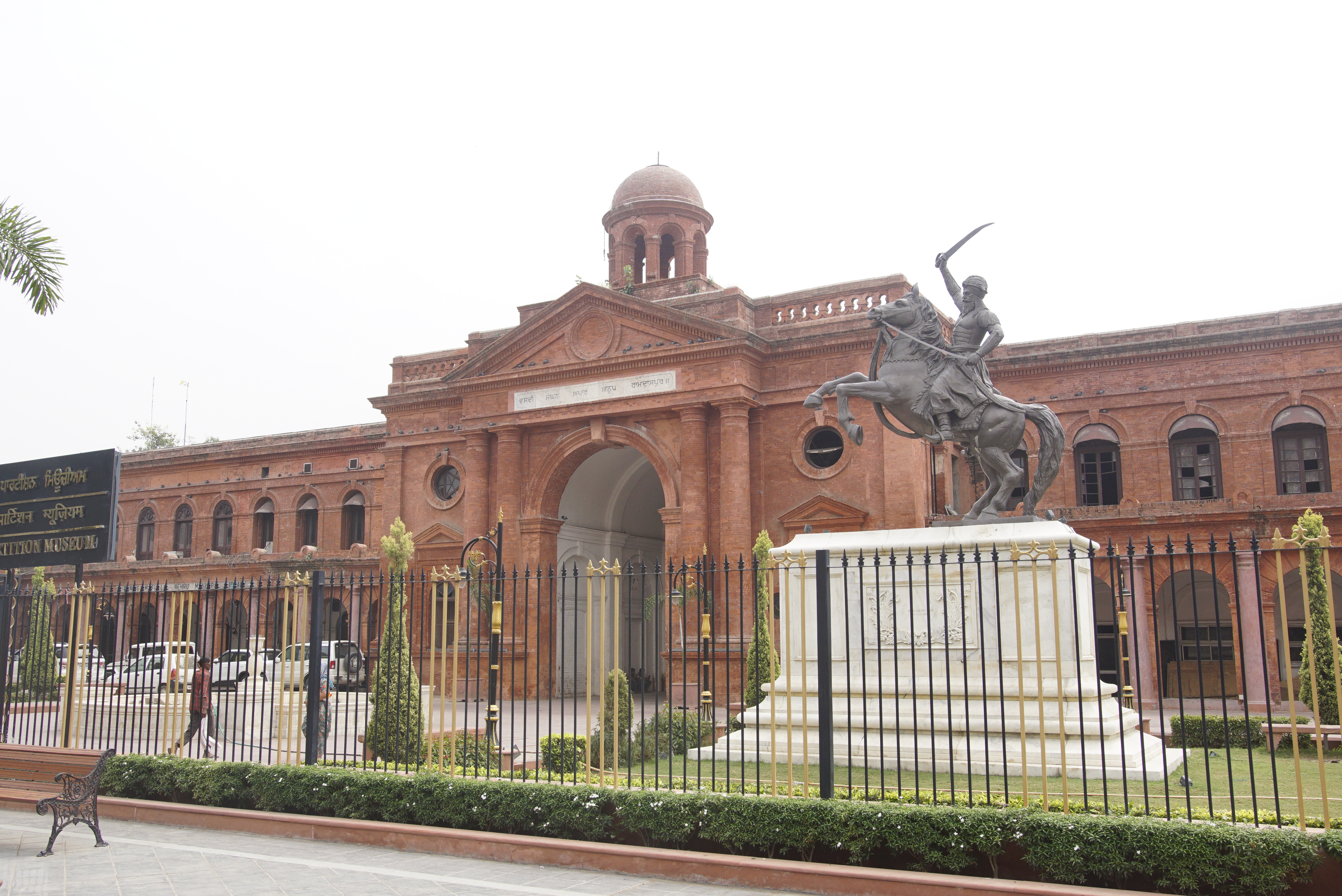
- Golden Temple Gurdwara Baba Atal Maharaja Ranjit Singh Chowk in Heritage Street Jallianwala Bagh Bhagwan Valmiki Tirath Sthal Ram Bagh Palace Gobindgarh Fort Partition Museum
- Nicknames: Nicknames: The Holy City; Ambarsar; Sifti Da Ghar; Guru Nagari; Golden City
- Map
- Location of the city center in Punjab Amritsar (India)
- Coordinates: 31.64°N 74.86°E
- Country: India
- State: Punjab
- District: Amritsar
- Established: 1574
- Founder: Guru Ram Das

Government
  - Type: Municipality
  - Body: Amritsar Municipal Corporation
  - Mayor: Jatinder Singh Bhatia (AAP)
  - Deputy Commissioner: Dalwinderjit Singh, IAS

Area
  - Total: 139 km^{2} (54 sq mi)
  - Rank: 2nd in Punjab

Population (2011)
  - Total: 1,159,227
  - Density: 8,340/km^{2} (21,600/sq mi)
  - Metro rank: 44th
- Demonym(s): Amritsariya, Ambarsariya, Amritsari
- Time zone: UTC+5:30 (IST)
- PIN: 143-001
- Telephone code: 91 183 XXX XXXX
- Vehicle registration: PB-01 (commercial vehicles), PB-02, PB-17, PB-89
- Website: amritsarcorp.com

Amritsar, (Note: Punjabi: [ˌəmːˈɾɪt̪.səɾ]) also known as Ambarsar, (Note: Punjabi pronunciation: [əmbaɾ.səɾ]) is the second-largest city in the Indian state of Punjab, after Ludhiana. Located in the Majha region, it is a major cultural, transportation and economic centre. The city is the administrative headquarters of the Amritsar district. It is situated 217 km (135 mi) north-west of Chandigarh, and 455 km (283 mi) north-west of New Delhi. It is 28 km (17.4 mi) from the India-Pakistan border, and 47 km (29 mi) north-east of Lahore, Pakistan.

According to the 2011 census, the city had a population of 1,132,383. It is one of the ten municipal corporations in the state; Karamjit Singh Rintu is serving as the mayor of the city. According to the United Nations, as of 2018, Amritsar is the second-most populous city in Punjab and the most populous metropolitan region in the state, with a population of roughly 2 million. Amritsar is the centre of the Amritsar Metropolitan Region.

Amritsar is the economic capital of Punjab. It is a major tourist centre with nearly a hundred thousand daily visitors. The city has been chosen as one of the heritage cities for the Heritage City Development and Augmentation Yojana (HRIDAY) program of the Government of India. It is home to the Golden Temple, the holiest site and most-visited gurudwara in Sikhism. The city is also known for its food, and for the manufacture of wooden chessboards and chess pieces.

== Etymology ==
The city takes its name from Amṛta Sarovara (Sanskrit for Pool of Nectar) which is the pool that surrounds Golden Temple at Gurdwara Shri Harmindir Sahib . The term Amritsar was previously sometimes known as Rāmdāspur after Guru Ram Das, the fourth Sikh guru who is credited with founding the city. The name Amritsar was often mispronounced as Ambarsar in rural dialects; the latter name has since become a colloquial term for the city.

== Mythology ==
The Bhagwan Valmiki Tirath Sthal situated at Amritsar is believed to be the ashram site of Maharishi Valmiki, the writer of the Ramayana. As per the Ramayana, Sita gave birth to Lava and Kusha, sons of Rama at Ramtirath ashram. Numerous people visit Ramtirath Temple, Located 12 Km west of Amritsar on Chogawan road, dates back to the period of Ramayana, Rishi Valmiki's hermitage. at the annual fair. The nearby cities Lahore and Kasur were believed to be founded by Lava and Kusha, respectively. It is believed that during the ashvamedha yajna by Rama, Lava and Kusha caught the ritual horse and tied Hanuman to a tree near to today's Durgiana Temple.

== History ==
=== Foundation ===
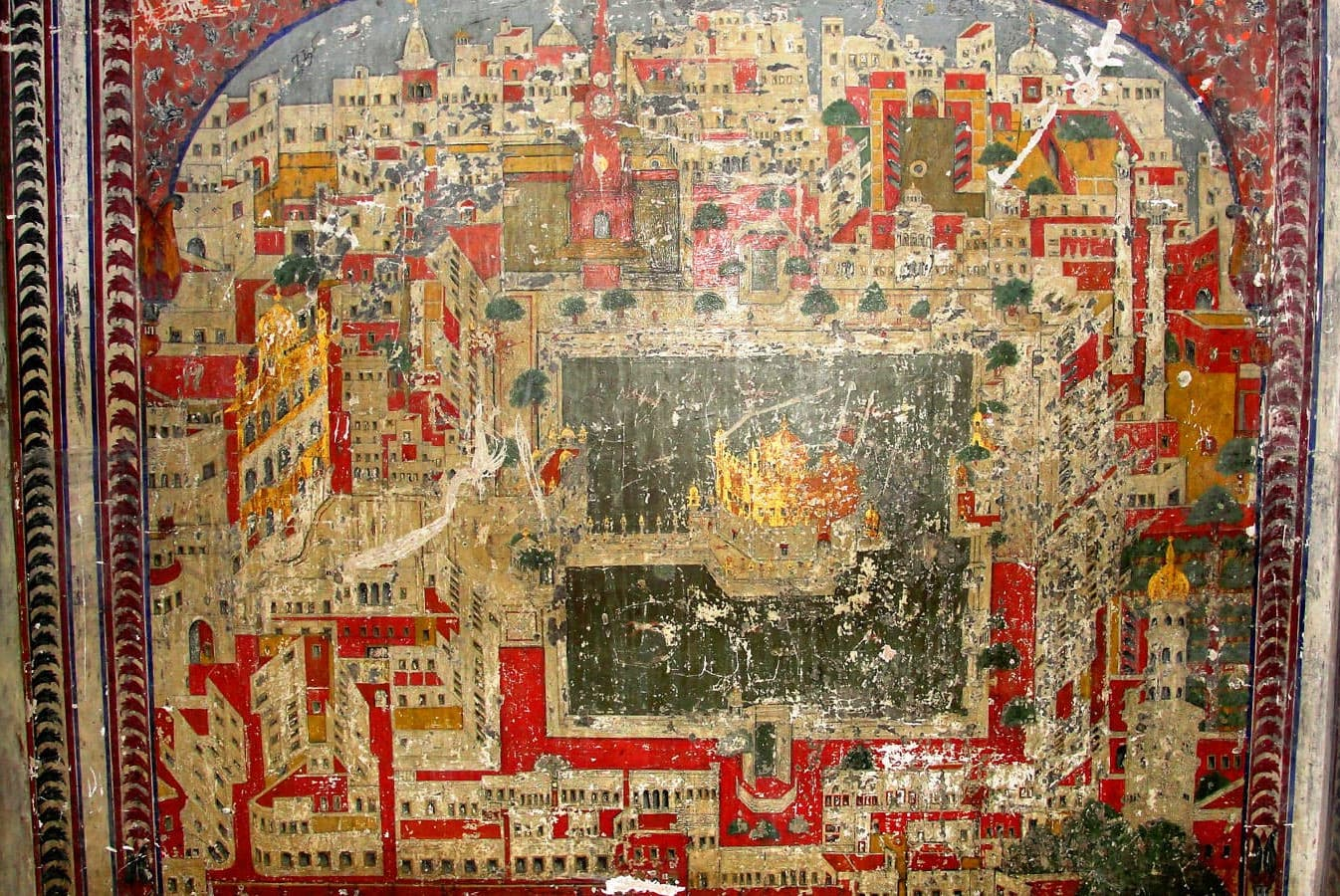
Overhead panoramic view artwork of Amritsar, c. 1850s–1890s

In the Sikh tradition, Guru Ram Das, the fourth Sikh guru, is credited with founding the holy city of Amritsar in 1574. Two versions of stories exist regarding the land where Guru Ram Das settled. In one, based on a Gazetteer record, the land was purchased, with Sikh donations, for 700 rupees from the owners of the village of Tung.

According to historical Sikh records, the site was chosen by Guru Amar Das and called Guru Da Chakk. The latter guru had asked Ram Das to find land to start a new town, and to create a man-made pool as its central point. After his coronation, Guru Ram Das in 1574, who faced hostile opposition from the sons of Guru Amar Das, founded the town; it was named after him as "Ramdaspur". He first completed the pool, and built his new official Guru centre and home next to it. He invited merchants and artisans from other parts of India to settle into the new town with him. The town expanded during the time of Guru Arjan Dev, financed by donations and constructed by volunteers. The town grew to become the city of Amritsar. After the son of Guru Ram Das built the gurdwara Harmandir Sahib, the pool area developed further as a temple complex. In 1604 Guru Ram Das's son installed the scripture of Sikhism inside the new temple.

The period and achievements of construction between 1574 and 1604 are described in Mahima Prakash Vartak, a semi-historical Sikh hagiographic text likely composed in 1741. It is the earliest known document dealing with the lives of all the ten Gurus.

=== 18th century ===
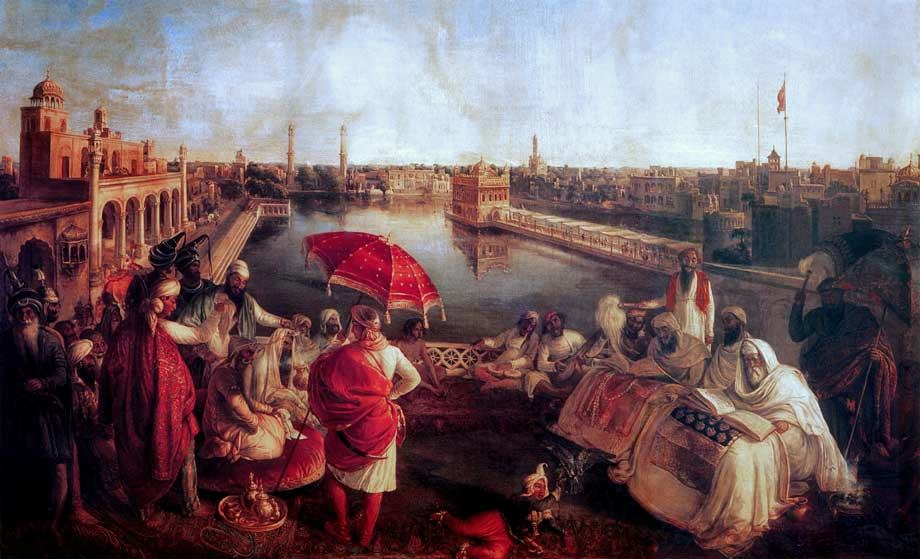
Maharaja Ranjit Singh listening to Guru Granth Sahib being recited near the Akal Takht and Golden Temple, Amritsar, Punjab, India. Painting by August Schoefft, 1850

In 1762 and 1766–1767, Ahmad Shah of the Durrani Empire invaded the Sikh Confederacy. He besieged Amritsar, massacred the populace, and destroyed the city.

=== Sikh Empire ===
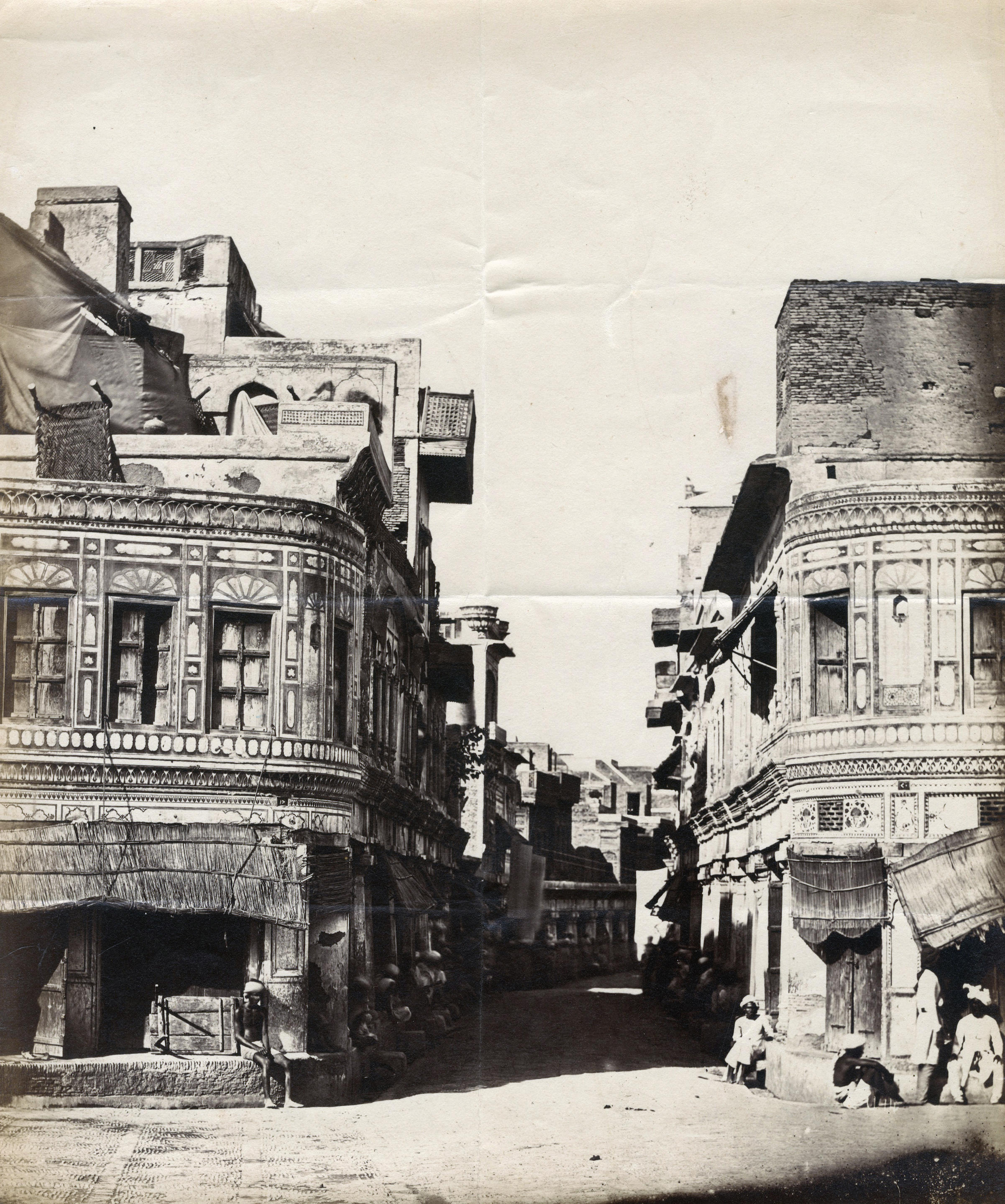
Photo of an Amritsar street scene, by Felice Beato, c. 1858–59

During the time of the Sikh Empire, in 1822 Maharaja Ranjit Singh fortified the city, starting from a wall at Katra Maha Singh area.

Among the Katras (fortified residential societies) constructed by Maharaja Ranjit Singh within the city were the following:

- Katra Moti Ram
- Katra Kanwar Kharak Singh (also known as 'Katra Nikkai')
- Katra Fateh Singh Kallianwala
- Katra Ahluwalia

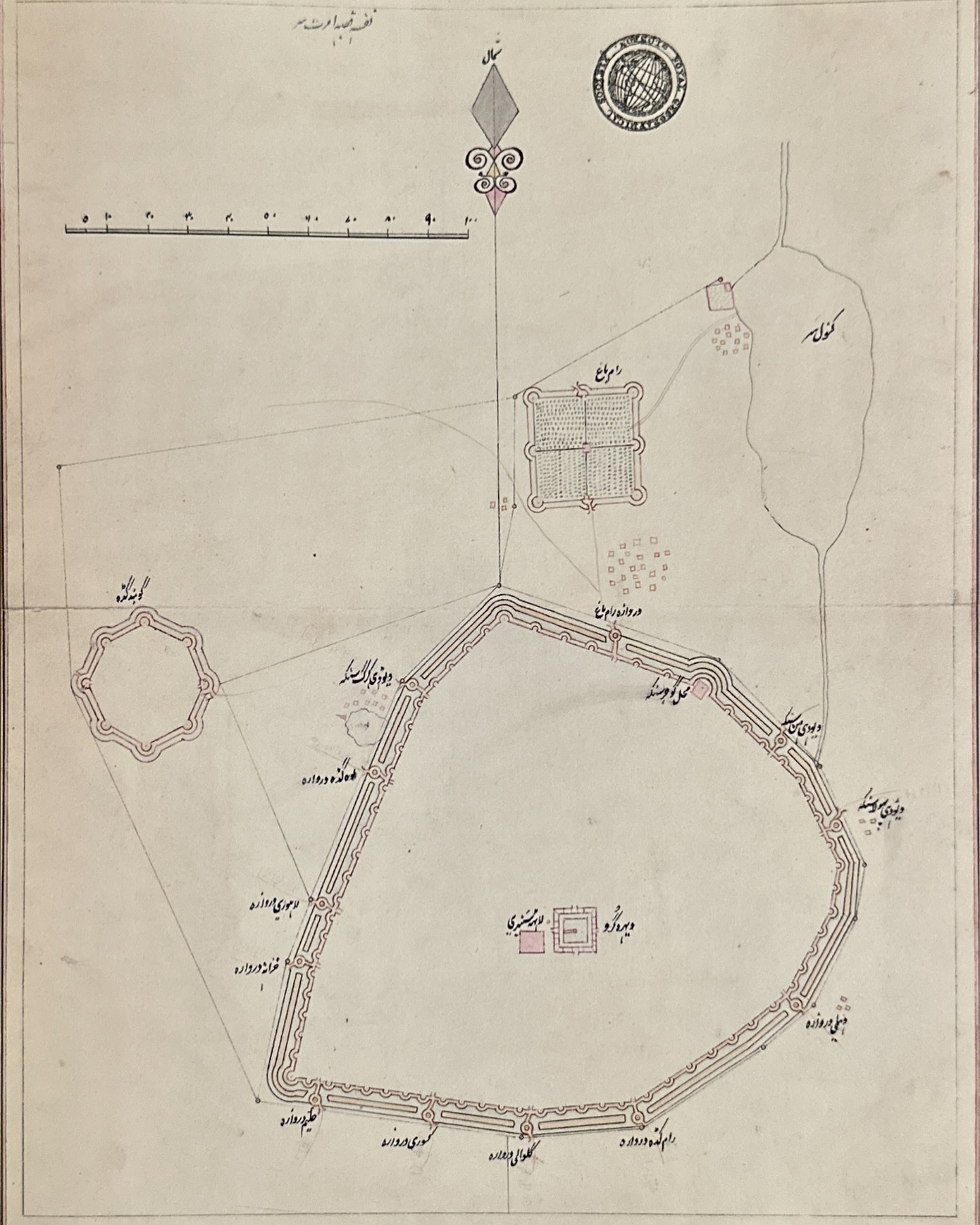
Map of Amritsar, with the city perimeter captioned in Perso-Arabic script marking the twelve historical gates of the old city-wall, ca.1831–35

Later, Sher Singh continued with construction of the city wall, adding twelve gates. He also had built a fort named Dhoor Kot; its fortification were yards broad and 7 yards high. The circumference of the walled city was around five miles. The twelve gates constructed during this era were known as (including later renamings):

1. Lahori Darwaza (Lahori Gate)
2. Khazana Darwaja (Khazana Gate)
3. Deori Hakiman (Gate Hakeema/Darwaza Hakeema Wala)
4. Gilwali Darwaza – no longer extant
5. Darwaza Rangar Nanglian (Gate Bhagatawala) – no longer extant
6. Darwaza Ramgarhian (Chattiwind Gate) – later restored
7. Darwaza Ahluwalia (Darwaza Gheo Mandi) – was no longer extant but has since been restored
8. Doburji Darwaza (Sultanwind Gate or Delhi Darwaza)
9. Deorhi Kalan
10. Darwaza Rambagh
11. Deorhi Shazada (Hathi Darwaza/Darwaza Sehzada)
12. Darwaza Lohgarh – no longer extant

=== British rule ===
When the British annexed Punjab in 1849, Amritsar was a walled city. The British built a thirteenth gate in 1866 known as Hall Gate, Neighborhood in Amritsar, Punjab.

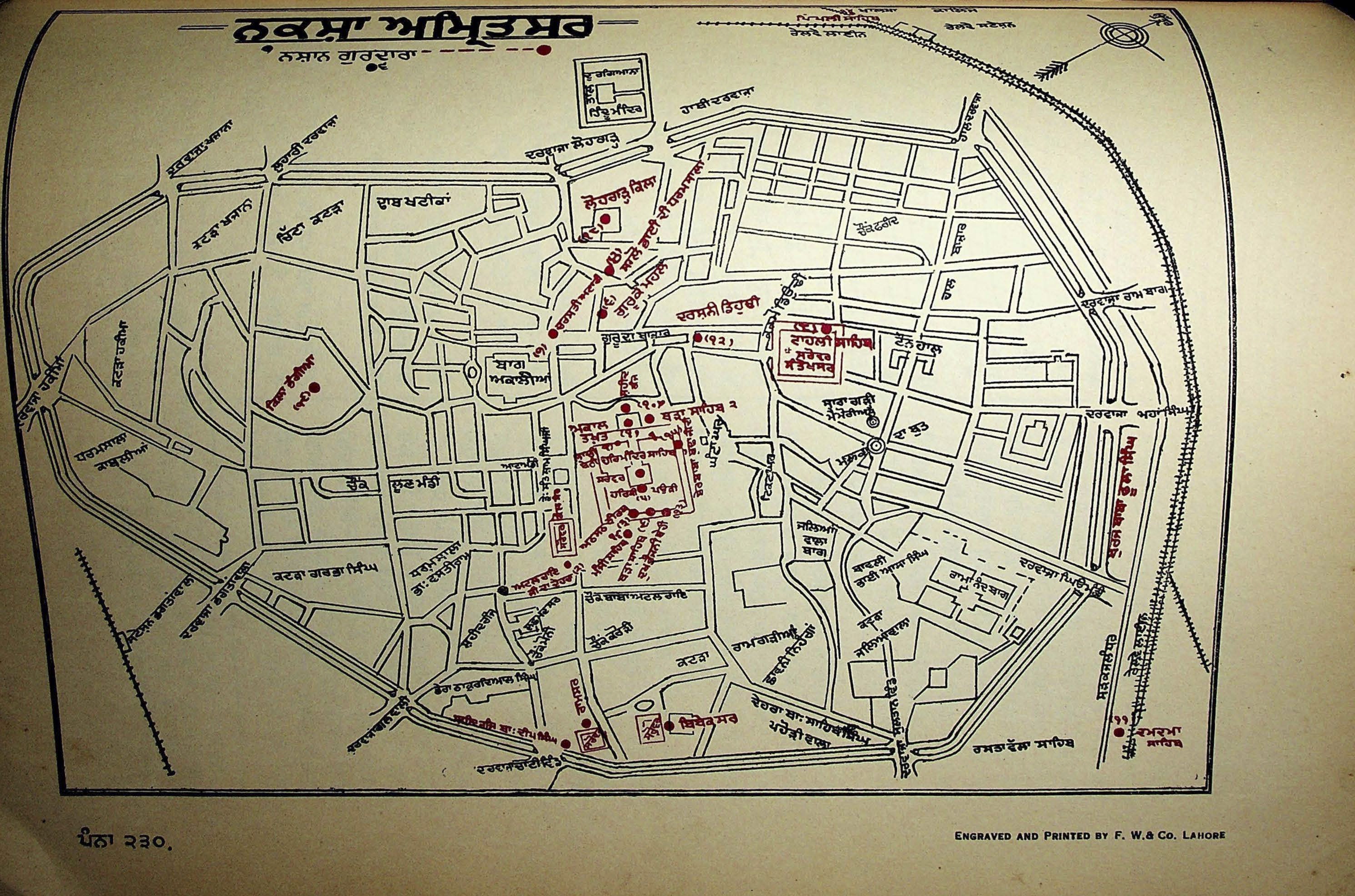
Map of Amritsar with the locations of Sikh sites labelled, as published in the Mahan Kosh (1930)

The British rulers would later demolish some of the walls and gates or reconstruct some. An entire new wall of the city was completed in 1885. Many surviving gates have since been renamed and no longer bear their mid-19th century names, while others have since been demolished.

The British supported the development of a textile manufacturing industry in the city, becoming one of the key cities of British Punjab alongside Lahore. The Khalsa College was established in Amritsar, establishing the city as a place of colonial education.

==== Jallianwala Bagh massacre ====
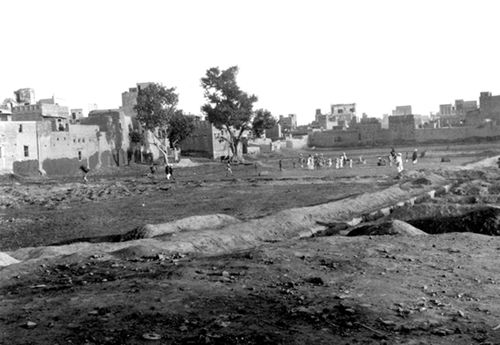
The Jallianwala Bagh in 1919, months after the massacre

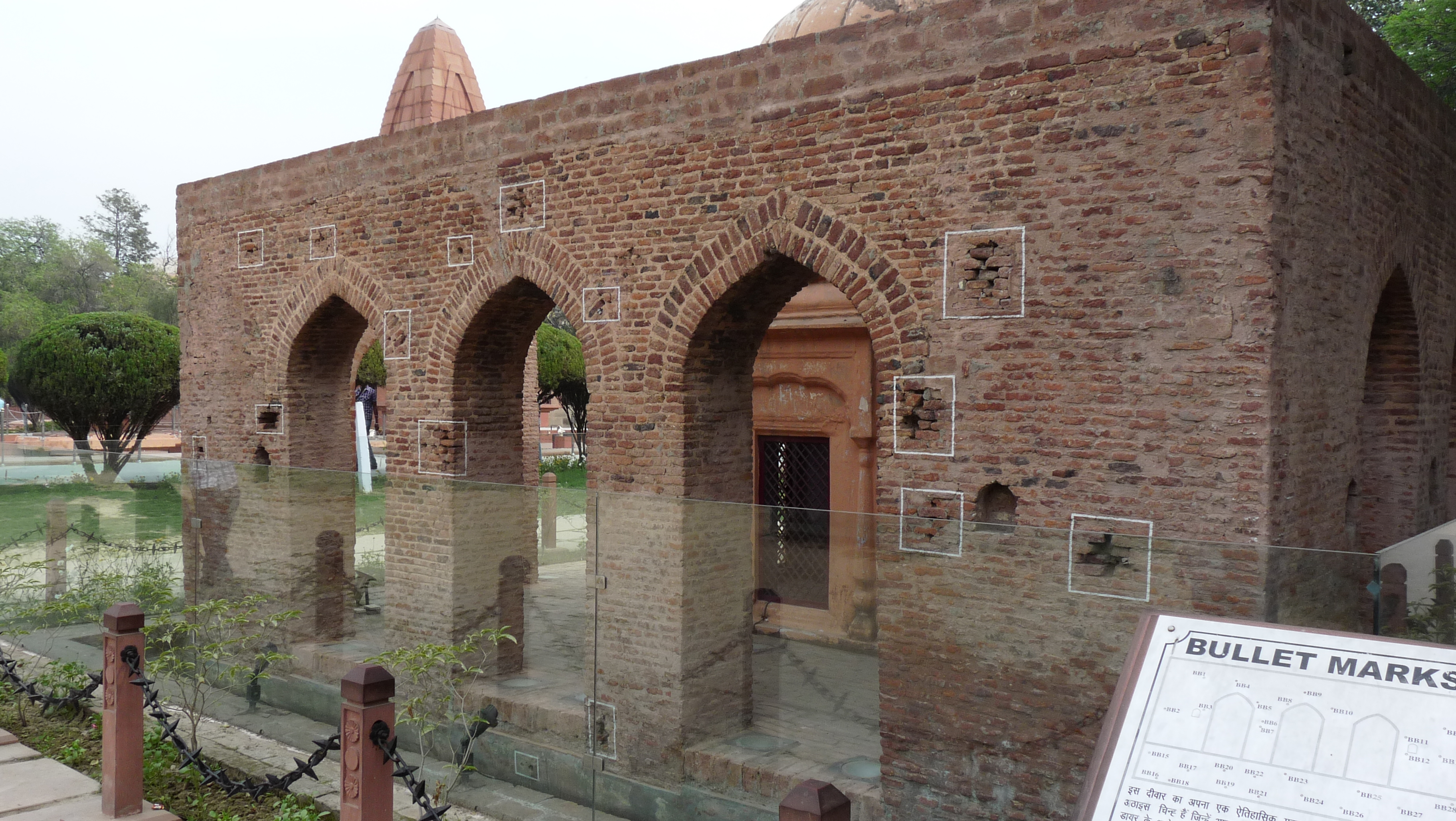
Bullet marks on the walls of the park premises

The Jallianwala Bagh massacre, involving the killings of hundreds of Indian civilians on the orders of British Colonel Reginald Edward Harry Dyer, took place on 13 April 1919 in the heart of Amritsar, the holiest city of the Sikhs, on a day sacred to them as the birth anniversary of the Khalsa (Vaisakhi day).

In Punjab, during World War I (1914–18), there was considerable social unrest, particularly among the Sikhs. First, they opposed the demolition of a boundary wall of Gurdwara Rakab Ganj, a historic gurdwara near the old Parliament House in New Delhi. Later, they were disturbed about the activities and trials of the Ghadarites, almost all of whom were Sikhs. In India as a whole, political activity had arisen during the strains of war. Two leaders had emerged: Mahatma Gandhi (1869–1948), who after a period of struggle as a young man against the British in South Africa had returned to India in January 1915 to work there for change and Annie Besant (1847–1933), head of the Theosophical Society of India. On 11 April 1916 she established the Home Rule League with the goal of autonomy for India. In December 1916, the Indian National Congress, at its annual session held at Lucknow, passed a resolution asking the king George V to issue a proclamation announcing that it is the "aim and intention of British policy to confer self-government on India at an early date".

On 10 April 1919, Satya Pal and Saifuddin Kitchlew, two popular proponents of the Satyagraha movement led by Gandhi, were called to the deputy commissioner's residence. There they were arrested and transported by car to Dharamshala, a hill town, now in Himachal Pradesh. A general strike arose in response in Amritsar. Excited groups of citizens soon merged into a crowd of about 50,000 marching to protest these arrests to the deputy commissioner. The crowd, however, was stopped by British colonial forces and fired upon near the railway foot-bridge. The official version reported that the number of casualties were 12 dead and between 20 and 30 wounded. Based on evidence presented to an inquiry of the Indian National Congress, fatalities were reported as between 20 and 30.

Three days later, on 13 April, the traditional festival of Baisakhi, thousands of unarmed Hindus, Sikhs and Muslims gathered in the Jallianwala Bagh. An hour after the meeting began as scheduled at 16:30, Dyer arrived with a group of sixty-five Gurkha soldiers (from the 9th Gorkha Rifles) and twenty-five Baluchi soldiers (from the 59th Scinde Rifles). Without warning the crowd to disperse, Dyer blocked the main exits from the Bagh and ordered his troops to begin shooting toward the densest sections of the crowd; the firing continued for approximately ten minutes. A British government inquiry into the massacre placed the death toll at 379. The Indian National Congress, on the other hand, estimated that approximately 1,000 people were killed.

=== Post-independence ===
During the partition of India, many Hindu and Sikh refugees originally hailing from Sialkot and Lahore districts (such as the former, urban residents of Lahore city and the rural folk of Lahore tehsil and the greater Lahore district) settled in Amritsar or used it as transit hub for further migration to new homes in other parts of India.

==== Operation Blue Star ====
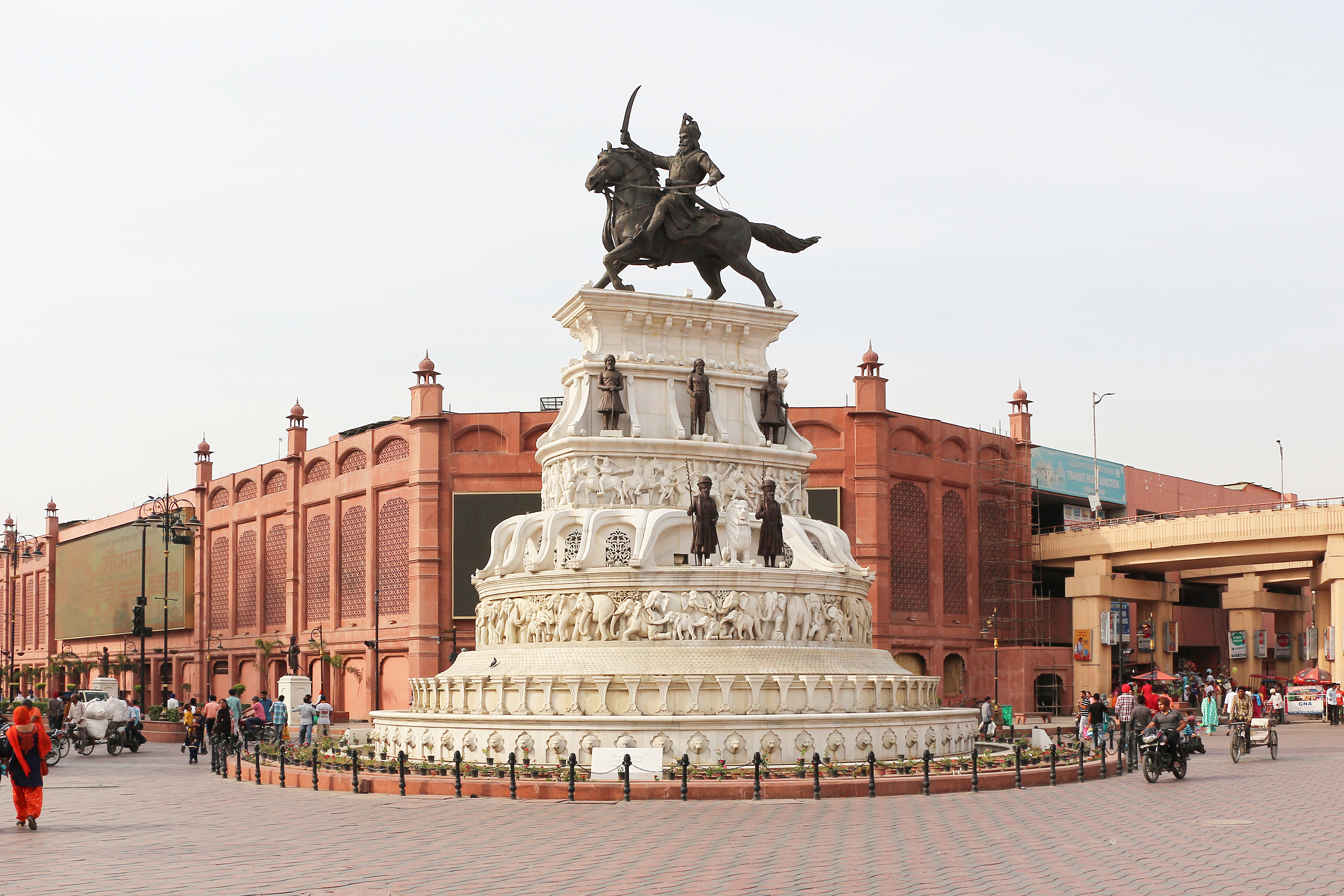
Statue of Maharaja Ranjit Singh in Amritsar

Amritsar was a center of unrest in the late 20th century. In the 1980s, Sikh militants occupied the Golden Temple there. Prime Minister of India, Indira Gandhi, ordered Operation Blue Star (1 – 6 June 1984), an Indian military operation to remove the militants from the temple. The operation was carried out by Indian army troops equipped with tanks and armoured vehicles. While militarily successful, the operation aroused immense controversy. The government's justification for the timing and style of the attack are hotly debated. India Today magazine has ranked Operation Blue Star as among the Top 10 Political Disgraces in India.

Official reports put the number of deaths among the Indian army at 83, with 493 civilians killed, including Sikh militants, while independent estimates place the numbers upwards of 5,000 people, a majority of them pilgrims, including women and children. In addition, the CBI is considered responsible for seizing historical artefacts and manuscripts in the Sikh Reference Library before burning it down. Four months after the operation, on 31 October 1984, Indira Gandhi was assassinated by two of her Sikh bodyguards in what is viewed as an act of vengeance. Following her assassination, more than 17,000 Sikhs were killed in the 1984 anti-Sikh riots.

== Geography ==
Amritsar is located at 31.63°N 74.87°E with an average elevation of 234 metres (768 ft) in the Majha region of the state of Punjab in North India and lies about 15 miles (24 km) east of the border with Pakistan. Administrative towns includes Ajnala, Attari, Beas, Budha Theh, Chheharta Sahib, Jandiala Guru, Majitha, Rajasansi, Ramdass, Rayya, Verka Town and Baba Bakala.

=== Climate ===
Typically for Northwestern India, Amritsar has a hot semi-arid climate (Köppen BSh) bordering on a monsoon-influenced humid subtropical climate (Cwa). Temperatures in Amritsar usually range from −1 to 45 °C (30 to 113 °F). It experiences four primary seasons: winter (December to March), when temperatures can drop to −1 °C (30 °F); summer (April to June), when temperatures can reach 45 °C (113 °F); monsoon (July to September); and post-monsoon (October to November). Annual rainfall is about 726.0 millimetres (28.6 in). The lowest recorded temperature is −3.6 °C (25.5 °F), was recorded on 9 December 1996 and the highest temperature, 48.0 °C (118.4 °F), was recorded on 23 May 2013. The official weather station for the city is the civil aerodrome at Rajasansi. Weather records here date back to 15 November 1947.

Climate data for Amritsar (ATQ) (1991–2020 normals, extremes 1947–present)
Month	Jan	Feb	Mar	Apr	May	Jun	Jul	Aug	Sep	Oct	Nov	Dec	Year
Record high °C (°F)	26.8 (80.2)	32.2 (90.0)	36.2 (97.2)	44.1 (111.4)	48.0 (118.4)	47.8 (118.0)	45.6 (114.1)	40.7 (105.3)	40.6 (105.1)	38.3 (100.9)	34.2 (93.6)	28.5 (83.3)	48.0 (118.4)
Mean maximum °C (°F)	22.7 (72.9)	26.1 (79.0)	32.4 (90.3)	40.6 (105.1)	44.5 (112.1)	44.6 (112.3)	39.8 (103.6)	37.0 (98.6)	36.4 (97.5)	35.3 (95.5)	30.4 (86.7)	25.2 (77.4)	45.6 (114.1)
Mean daily maximum °C (°F)	17.7 (63.9)	21.7 (71.1)	27.0 (80.6)	34.4 (93.9)	39.4 (102.9)	38.9 (102.0)	35.0 (95.0)	34.1 (93.4)	33.9 (93.0)	32.0 (89.6)	27.0 (80.6)	20.9 (69.6)	30.1 (86.2)
Daily mean °C (°F)	11.0 (51.8)	14.4 (57.9)	19.0 (66.2)	25.4 (77.7)	30.7 (87.3)	31.8 (89.2)	30.3 (86.5)	29.7 (85.5)	28.2 (82.8)	24.1 (75.4)	18.1 (64.6)	12.6 (54.7)	22.9 (73.2)
Mean daily minimum °C (°F)	3.8 (38.8)	6.7 (44.1)	11.2 (52.2)	16.6 (61.9)	21.9 (71.4)	24.7 (76.5)	25.7 (78.3)	25.3 (77.5)	22.7 (72.9)	16.4 (61.5)	9.4 (48.9)	4.6 (40.3)	15.7 (60.3)
Mean minimum °C (°F)	−0.3 (31.5)	2.2 (36.0)	6.1 (43.0)	10.9 (51.6)	16.6 (61.9)	19.7 (67.5)	21.8 (71.2)	21.7 (71.1)	18.5 (65.3)	11.8 (53.2)	5.2 (41.4)	0.5 (32.9)	−0.7 (30.7)
Record low °C (°F)	−2.9 (26.8)	−2.6 (27.3)	2.0 (35.6)	6.4 (43.5)	9.6 (49.3)	15.6 (60.1)	18.2 (64.8)	18.8 (65.8)	13.0 (55.4)	7.3 (45.1)	−0.6 (30.9)	−3.6 (25.5)	−3.6 (25.5)
Average rainfall mm (inches)	27.1 (1.07)	39.8 (1.57)	32.6 (1.28)	21.9 (0.86)	20.8 (0.82)	80.9 (3.19)	181.6 (7.15)	168.9 (6.65)	90.7 (3.57)	12.3 (0.48)	5.8 (0.23)	6.8 (0.27)	689.2 (27.13)
Average rainy days	2.1	3.1	2.4	1.9	2.0	4.8	8.1	7.0	3.7	1.0	0.6	0.8	37.4
Average relative humidity (%) (at 17:30 IST)	68	58	50	32	26	40	65	70	64	52	53	63	53
Average dew point °C (°F)	7.0 (44.6)	10.0 (50.0)	13.3 (55.9)	14.0 (57.2)	15.0 (59.0)	19.5 (67.1)	25.0 (77.0)	25.6 (78.1)	23.5 (74.3)	18.3 (64.9)	12.0 (53.6)	8.0 (46.4)	15.9 (60.7)
Mean monthly sunshine hours	181.7	192.7	219.4	265.0	294.7	269.0	215.5	227.7	240.8	253.2	220.1	182.2	2,762
Average ultraviolet index	2	4	6	7	8	9	7	6	5	5	4	2	5
Source 1: India Meteorological Department Time and Date (dewpoints, 2005-2015)
Source 2: NOAA (sun 1971–1990) Tokyo Climate Center (mean temperatures 1991–2020); Weather Atlas

Amritsar has been ranked 39th best "National Clean Air City" (under Category 1 >10L Population cities) in India according to 'Swachh Vayu Survekshan 2024 Results'

== Demographics ==
Historical population
Year	Pop.	±%
1868	133,925	—
1871	136,000	+1.5%
1881	151,896	+11.7%
1891	136,766	−10.0%
1901	162,429	+18.8%
1911	152,756	−6.0%
1921	160,218	+4.9%
1931	264,840	+65.3%
1941	391,010	+47.6%
1951	336,114	−14.0%
1961	390,055	+16.0%
1971	454,805	+16.6%
1981	594,844	+30.8%
1991	708,835	+19.2%
2001	979,801	+38.2%
2011	1,159,227	+18.3%

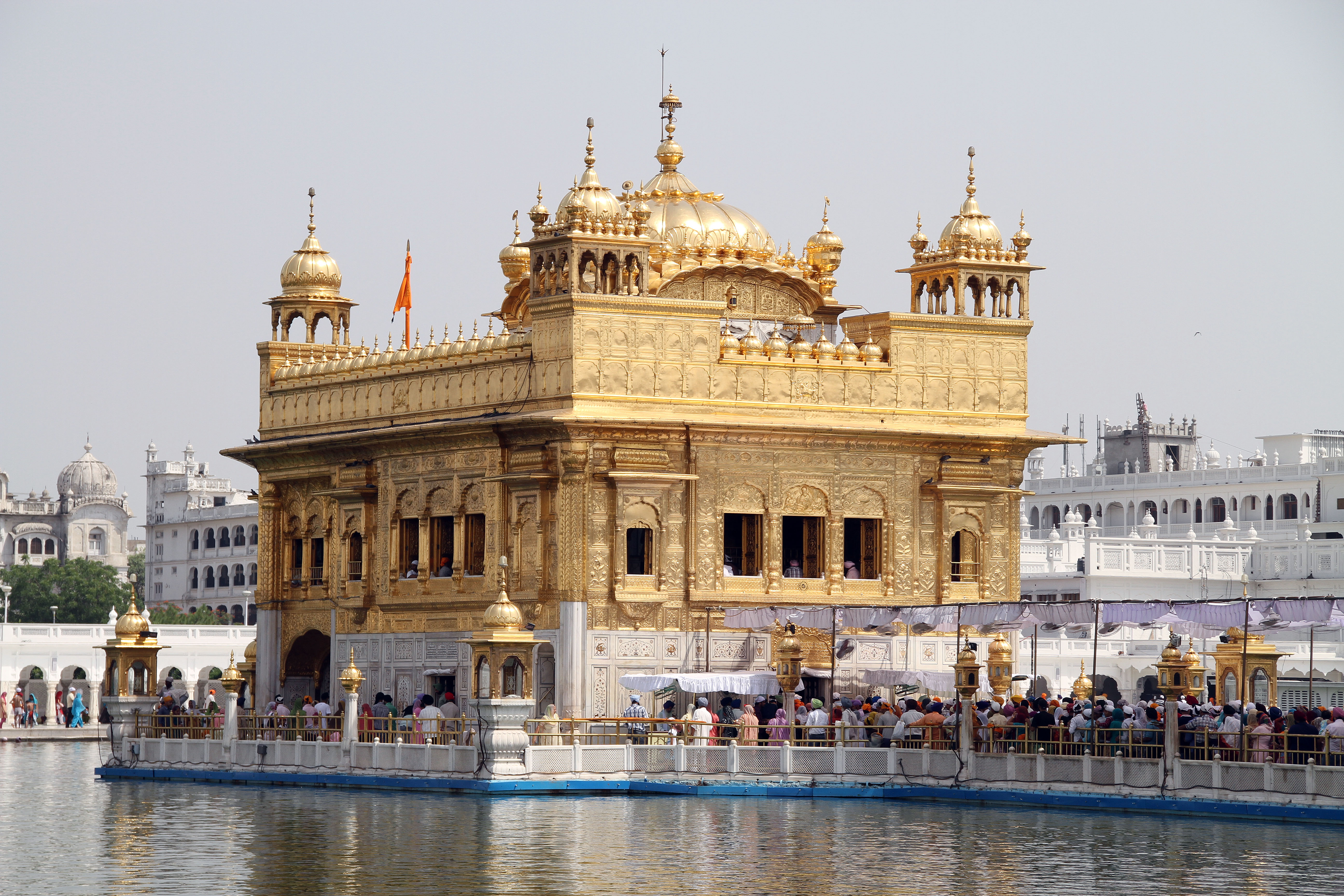
The Golden Temple, in Amritsar, is the holiest site in Sikhism

In 1871–72, Amritsar was the 11th most populous city in British India with a population of 136,000 and had a larger population than Lahore (99,000). As of the 2011 census, Amritsar municipality had a population of 1,159,227. The municipality had a sex ratio of 884 females per 1,000 males and 119,592 (10.32%) of the population were under six years old, with the child sex ratio being 826 females per 1000 males. Literacy was 83.81%; male literacy was 86.52% and female literacy was 80.76%. The scheduled caste population is 21.76%.

Harjap Singh Aujla claims around 30% of the city's population descend from partition-era refugees from western Punjab (specifically Lahore), with most originally hailing from Lahore district.

=== Religion ===
Religion in Amritsar City (2011)
Religion	Percent
Hinduism	49.36%
Sikhism	48.00%
Christianity	1.23%
Islam	0.51%
Other or not stated	0.90%

According to 2011 Census of India, Hinduism and Sikhism are the main religions of the Amritsar city followed by 49.36% and 48.00% of the population, respectively. Christianity is followed by 1.23% and Islam 0.51%. Around 0.9% of the population of the city stated 'No Particular Religion' or other religion.

Amritsar is the holiest city in Sikhism and about 30 million people visit it each year for pilgrimage.

Religious groups in Amritsar City (1868−2011) (Note: 1881-1941: Data for the entirety of the town of Amritsar, which included Amritsar Municipality and Amritsar Cantonment.)
Religious group	1868		1881		1891		1901		1911		1921		1931		1941		2011	
Religious group	Pop.	%	Pop.	%	Pop.	%	Pop.	%	Pop.	%	Pop.	%	Pop.	%	Pop.	%	Pop.	%
Islam	61,193	45.69%	75,891	49.96%	63,366	46.33%	77,795	47.89%	71,851	47.04%	71,180	44.43%	132,362	49.98%	184,055	47.07%	5,862	0.51%
Hinduism	49,115	36.67%	61,274	40.34%	56,652	41.42%	65,117	40.09%	58,720	38.44%	65,313	40.77%	98,001 (Note: 1931-1941: Including Ad-Dharmis)	37%	144,522	36.96%	572,189	49.36%
Sikhism	19,267	14.39%	13,876	9.14%	15,751	11.52%	17,860	11%	20,357	13.33%	21,478	13.41%	32,009	12.09%	58,779	15.03%	556,431	48%
Christianity	130	0.1%	—N/a	—N/a	848	0.62%	1,104	0.68%	1,128	0.74%	1,446	0.9%	1,819	0.69%	2,611	0.67%	14,280	1.23%
Buddhism	0	0%	—N/a	—N/a	0	0%	0	0%	0	0%	5	0%	0	0%	—N/a	—N/a	773	0.07%
Jainism	—N/a	—N/a	9	0.01%	143	0.1%	532	0.33%	652	0.43%	738	0.46%	604	0.23%	974	0.25%	1,143	0.1%
Zoroastrianism	—N/a	—N/a	—N/a	—N/a	5	0%	19	0.01%	48	0.03%	58	0.04%	41	0.02%	—N/a	—N/a	—N/a	—N/a
Judaism	—N/a	—N/a	—N/a	—N/a	0	0%	—N/a	—N/a	0	0%	0	0%	4	0%	—N/a	—N/a	—N/a	—N/a
Others	4,220	3.15%	846	0.56%	1	0%	2	0%	0	0%	0	0%	0	0%	79	0.02%	8,549	0.74%
Total population	133,925	100%	151,896	100%	136,766	100%	162,429	100%	152,756	100%	160,218	100%	264,840	100%	391,010	100%	1,159,227	100%

Languages spoken in Amritsar city (2011)
1. Punjabi (91.1%)
2. Hindi (7.90%)
3. Others (0.98%)

At the time of the 2011 census, 91.12% of the population spoke Punjabi and 7.90% Hindi as their first language.

== Government and politics ==
=== Politics ===
The city is part of the Amritsar (Lok Sabha constituency).

Constituency number	Constituency name	Reserved for (SC/None)	Electors (2017)	District
15	Amritsar North	None	175,908	Amritsar
16	Amritsar West	SC	179,766	Amritsar
17	Amritsar Central	None	135,954	Amritsar
18	Amritsar East	None	153,629	Amritsar
19	Amritsar South	None	148,809	Amritsar
20	Attari	SC	173,543	Amritsar

=== Amritsar Municipal Corporation ===
Amritsar was notified as a city on 29 March 1977 under the Punjab Municipal Corporation Act, 1976, following which the Municipal Corporation replaced the earlier Municipal Committee.

The city's first local administrative body was established as a Town Committee in 1858, which was later upgraded to a Municipal Committee in 1868. The first election to the Municipal Corporation was conducted in 1991, when the city was divided into 50 wards. Sh. O. P. Soni was elected Mayor on 25 June 1991, with S. Raminder Singh Bularia as Senior Deputy Mayor and Sh. Subash Sharma as Deputy Mayor. This elected body remained in office until its dissolution on 18 June 1996.

Subsequently, the number of wards was increased to 60, and elections were held on 28 May 1997. Sh. Subash Sharma, S. Lakha Singh, and Kumari Raj Sharma were elected as Mayor, Senior Deputy Mayor, and Deputy Mayor respectively. Following the resignation of Sh. Subash Sharma, Sh. Brij Mohan Kapur was elected Mayor on 18 October 2000.

The third municipal election took place on 27 April 2002, with the mayoral election held on 15 June 2002. Sh. Sunil Dutti, Sh. Sawinder Singh, and Sh. Om Parkash were elected as Mayor, Senior Deputy Mayor, and Deputy Mayor respectively.

Prior to the fourth municipal election, the number of wards was increased to 65. Elections were held on 8 August 2007, and the election for the office of Mayor took place on 6 September 2007. Sh. Shwait Malik was elected Mayor, with Sh. Ajaybir Pal Singh Randhawa as Senior Deputy Mayor and Sh. Kashmir Singh as Deputy Mayor.

To enhance representation, 33 per cent of seats in the Municipal Corporation are reserved for women on a rotational basis. Seats are also reserved for Scheduled Castes and Backward Classes in accordance with government policy.

The present Municipal House was constituted on 19 September 2012. Sh. Bakshi Ram Arora was elected Mayor, Sh. Avtar Singh (Trucka Wala) as Senior Deputy Mayor, and Sh. Avinash Jolly as Deputy Mayor.

==== List of Mayors ====
The Mayor of Amritsar is the elected head of the Municipal Corporation of Amritsar and is regarded as the first citizen of the city. The position is primarily ceremonial, as executive authority rests with the Municipal Commissioner. The mayor represents the city in official functions and presides over meetings and deliberations of the Municipal Corporation, ensuring orderly conduct and upholding the dignity of the office.

S. No.	Name	Took Office	Left Office	Tenure	Party	Ward No.	Reference
1	Om Prakash Soni	25 June 1991	18 June 1996	4 years and 359 days	INC		
2	Subash Sharma	28 May 1997	18 October 2000	3 years and 143 days	BJP		
3	Brij Mohan Kapur	18 October 2000	27 April 2002	1 year and 191 days	BJP		
4	Sunil Dutti	15 June 2002	2007	5 years	INC		
5	Shwait Malik	6 September 2007	2012	5 years	BJP		
6	Bakshi Ram Arora	19 September 2012	2017	5 years	BJP		
7	Karamjit Singh Rintu	23 January 2018	27 January 2025	7 years and 361 days	AAP		
8	Jatinder Singh	27 January 2025	Incumbent	359 days	AAP	26	

==== Current Members ====
The Amritsar Municipal Corporation consists of 85 councillors, who are directly elected for a five-year term. The council is headed by a mayor. The most recent municipal elections were conducted on 21 December 2024. Jatinder Singh of the Aam Aadmi Party currently serves as the Mayor of Amritsar. The positions of Senior Deputy Mayor and Deputy Mayor are held by Priyanka Sharma and Anita Devi respectively, both of whom are members of the Aam Aadmi Party.

Mayor- Jatinder Singh			
Senior Deputy Mayor- Priyanka Sharma			
Junior Deputy Mayor- Anita Rani			
Ward Number	Name of Councillor	Party	Remarks
1	Kuljit Kaur	Aam Aadmi Party	
2	Amarjit Singh	Aam Aadmi Party	
3	Navdeep Kaur	Indian National Congress	
4	Mandeep Singh Aujla	Aam Aadmi Party	Elected as independent councilor; later joined AAP
5	Kriti Arora	Bhartiya Janta Party	
6	Amandeep Aery	Bhartiya Janta Party	
7	Kajal Devi	Aam Aadmi Party	
8	Balwinder Singh	Aam Aadmi Party	
9	Shobit Kaur	Indian National Congress	
10	Shruti Vij	Bhartiya Janta Party	
11	Priyanka Sharma	Aam Aadmi Party	
12	Narinder Singh	Indian National Congress	
13	Gurwinder Kaur	Aam Aadmi Party	
14	Rajkanwal Preetpal Singh Sandhu	Indian National Congress	
15	Rama Devi	Bhartiya Janta Party	
16	Sandeep Sharma	Indian National Congress	
17	Anita Kumari	Indian National Congress	
18	Navdeep Singh	Indian National Congress	
19	Navjeet Kaur	Aam Aadmi Party	
20	Gurinder Singh	Indian National Congress	
21	Kulwinder Kaur	Aam Aadmi Party	
22	Sujinder Bidlan	Indian National Congress	
23	Kulwinder Kaur	Indian National Congress	
24	Satnam Singh Sabha	Indian National Congress	
25	Monika Sharma	Indian National Congress	
26	Jatinder Singh	Aam Aadmi Party	
27	Preet Kaur	Aam Aadmi Party	Elected as BJP councilor, later joined AAP
28	Saurabh Madaan Mithu	Indian National Congress	
29	Shweta Devi	Indian National Congress	
30	Avtar Singh	Shiromani Akali Dal	
31	Sukhbir Kaur	Aam Aadmi Party	
32	Jagmeet Singh Ghulli	Aam Aadmi Party	Elected as independent councilor; later joined AAP
33	Ashnoor Kaur	Aam Aadmi Party	
34	Amritpal Singh	Indian National Congress	
35	Amarji Kaur	Bharatiya Janata Party	
36	Ashok Kumar	Aam Aadmi Party	
37	Gurjit Kaur	Aam Aadmi Party	
38	Bhagwant Singh	Aam Aadmi Party	
39	Manpreet Kaur	Aam Aadmi Party	
40	Gurwinder Singh	Aam Aadmi Party	
41	Sukhwinder Kaur	Indian National Congress	
42	Gagandeep Singh	Indian National Congress	
43	Inderjit Singh	Shiromani Akali Dal	
44	Jaswinder Singh Gill	Indian National Congress	
45	Sukhbir Kaur	Indian National Congress	
46	Navpreet Singh	Indian National Congress	
47	Kiranjit Kaur	Aam Aadmi Party	
48	Ashwani Kumar	Indian National Congress	
49	Ritu Kundra	Indian National Congress	
50	Ritu Devi	Aam Aadmi Party	
51	Sarita Devi	Indian National Congress	
52	Vikas Soni	Indian National Congress	
53	Komal Shah	Indian National Congress	
54	Amit Kumar	Indian National Congress	
55	Kulbir Kaur	Indian National Congress	
56	Varinder Vicky Datta	Aam Aadmi Party	
57	Manju Mehra Pappal	Indian National Congress	
58	Jarnail Singh	Aam Aadmi Party	
59	Gurmeet Kaur	Indian National Congress	
60	Gaurav Gill	Bharatiya Janata Party	
61	Rajni Devi	Bharatiya Janata Party	
62	Sameer Dutta	Indian National Congress	
63	Usha Rani	Aam Aadmi Party	Elected as independent councilor; later joined AAP
64	Nitu Tangri	Independent	
65	Neeraj Chaudhary	Indian National Congress	
66	Virat Devgan	Aam Aadmi Party	
67	Anita Devi	Aam Aadmi Party	Elected as independent councilor; later joined AAP
68	Vikas Gill	Bharatiya Janata Party	
69	Gurpreet Kaur	Indian National Congress	
70	Vijay Kumar Bhagat	Aam Aadmi Party	Elected as independent councilor; later joined AAP
71	Surjit Kaur	Aam Aadmi Party	
72	Avtar Singh	Indian National Congress	Elected as INC councilor; later joined AAP, then returned to INC
73	Kuldeep Singh	Indian National Congress	
74	Paramjeet Kaur Dhillon	Shiromani Akali Dal	
75	Kashmir Singh	Indian National Congress	
76	Sukhbir Singh	Aam Aadmi Party	
77	Sunita Devi	Indian National Congress	
78	Anita Sharma	Aam Aadmi Party	Elected as independent councilor; later joined AAP
79	Shivali Devi	Aam Aadmi Party	Elected as INC councilor; later joined AAP
80	Raman Kumar	Indian National Congress	
81	Nisha Dhillon	Indian National Congress	
82	Sandeep Singh	Aam Aadmi Party	
83	Nagwant Kaur	Shiromani Akali Dal	
84	Rashpal Singh	Indian National Congress	
85	Natasha Gill	Aam Aadmi Party	Elected as independent councilor; later joined AAP

==== Administrative setup ====
===== Tehsils =====
Amritsar district is divided into 6 Tehsils:

1. Ajnala
2. Amritsar-I
3. Amritsar-II
4. Baba Bakala
5. Majitha
6. Lopoke

===== Blocks =====
Amritsar district is divided into 10 blocks

1. Ajnala
2. Attari
3. Chogawan
4. Harsha China
5. Jandiala Guru
6. Majitha
7. Rayya
8. Tarsika
9. Verka
10. Ramdas

=== Civic utilities ===
==== Medical facilities ====
- Dr. Vidyasagar Institute of Mental Health, a government mental hospital
- Government Medical College
- Sri Guru Ram Das University of Health Sciences

== Economy ==
Amritsar is the second-largest city and district of Punjab. It is also one of the fastest-growing cities of Punjab. In the mid-1980s the city was famous for its textile industry. Amritsar's trade and industry faced a blow during militancy period in 1980s, but there are still many textile mills, knitting units and embroidery factories functional in the city. It is famous for its pashmina shawls, woolen clothes, blankets, etc. Among handicrafts, the craft of the Thatheras of Jandiala Guru in Amritsar district got enlisted on UNESCO's List of Intangible Cultural Heritage in 2014, and the effort to revive this craft under the umbrella of Project Virasat is among India's biggest government-sponsored craft revival programs. Tourism and hospitality have recently become the backbone of local economy due to heavy tourist arrivals. Hundreds of small and some large hotels have sprung up to cater to the increased tourist inflow. Restaurants, taxi operators, local shopkeepers have all benefited from the tourist boom.

== Tourism ==
- Golden Temple and Heritage Street
- Khalsa College
- Durgiana Mandir and Bada Hanuman Mandir
- Mata Lal Devi Mandir, Model Town
- Shri Ram Tirath and Valmiki Tirath
- Shivala Bagh Bhaiyan
- Punjab State War Heroes' Memorial & Museum
- Sadda Pind
- Urban Haat Food Street
- Gobindgarh Fort
- Ram Bagh Palace and
  - Maharaja Ranjit Singh Museum
- Wagah border
- Gurudwara Shaheed Ganj Sahib
- Partition Museum
- Jallianwala Bagh
- Pul Kanjri
- VR Ambarsar, Circular Road
- Mall of Amritsar, near Hyatt
- Jang-e-Azadi Memorial near Kartarpur, India

== Transport ==
=== Air ===
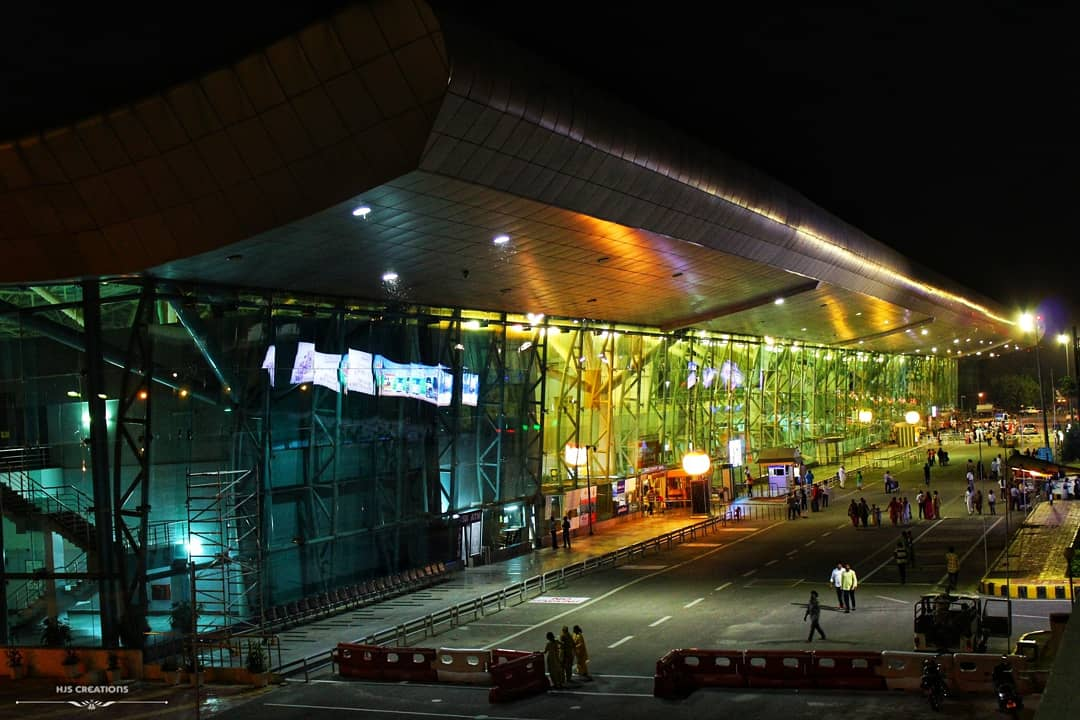
Sri Guru Ram Das Ji International Airport

Amritsar hosts Sri Guru Ram Das Ji International Airport. The airport is connected to other parts of India and other countries with direct international flights to cities and is the 12th busiest airport in the country in terms of international traffic. It serves Amritsar and several other districts in Punjab and neighbouring states.

=== Rail ===
Amritsar Junction railway station is the main station serving Amritsar. It is the busiest railway station in Indian state of Punjab and one of the highest revenue-generating station of Northern Railways. Due to high traffic at the Amritsar Junction railway station, Indian Railways has planned to develop two satellite stations-Chheharta and Bhagtanwala, in order to decongest traffic at this station. As many as 6 trains would be shifted to Chheharta railway station in the first phase. The Indian Railway Stations Development Corporation has also planned to make the Amritsar Junction railway station a world-class railway station on lines of the international airport based on PPP model. The project has received an overwhelming response with bids from 7 private firms, including GMR.

=== Road ===
Amritsar is located on the historic Grand Trunk Road (G.T. Road), also known as NH 1 now renumbered as National Highway 3. An expressway by name of Delhi–Amritsar–Katra Expressway at the cost of ₹25,000 crore is approved under Bharatmala scheme which will cut the travel time from Amritsar to New Delhi by road from current 8 hours, to 4 hours. Another expressway, called Amritsar–Jamnagar Expressway is under construction which will connect Amritsar to Jamnagar in Gujarat. Additionally, NH 54 (Old NH15), NH 354 and NH 503A connect Amritsar to other parts of state and rest of India. A ring road will also be built surrounding all 4 sides of Amritsar

₹ 450,000,000 is being spent to expand the Amritsar-Jalandhar stretch of G.T. Road to four lanes. In 2010, elevated road with four lanes connected to the National highway for better access to the Golden Temple has been started.

=== Amritsar MetroBus ===
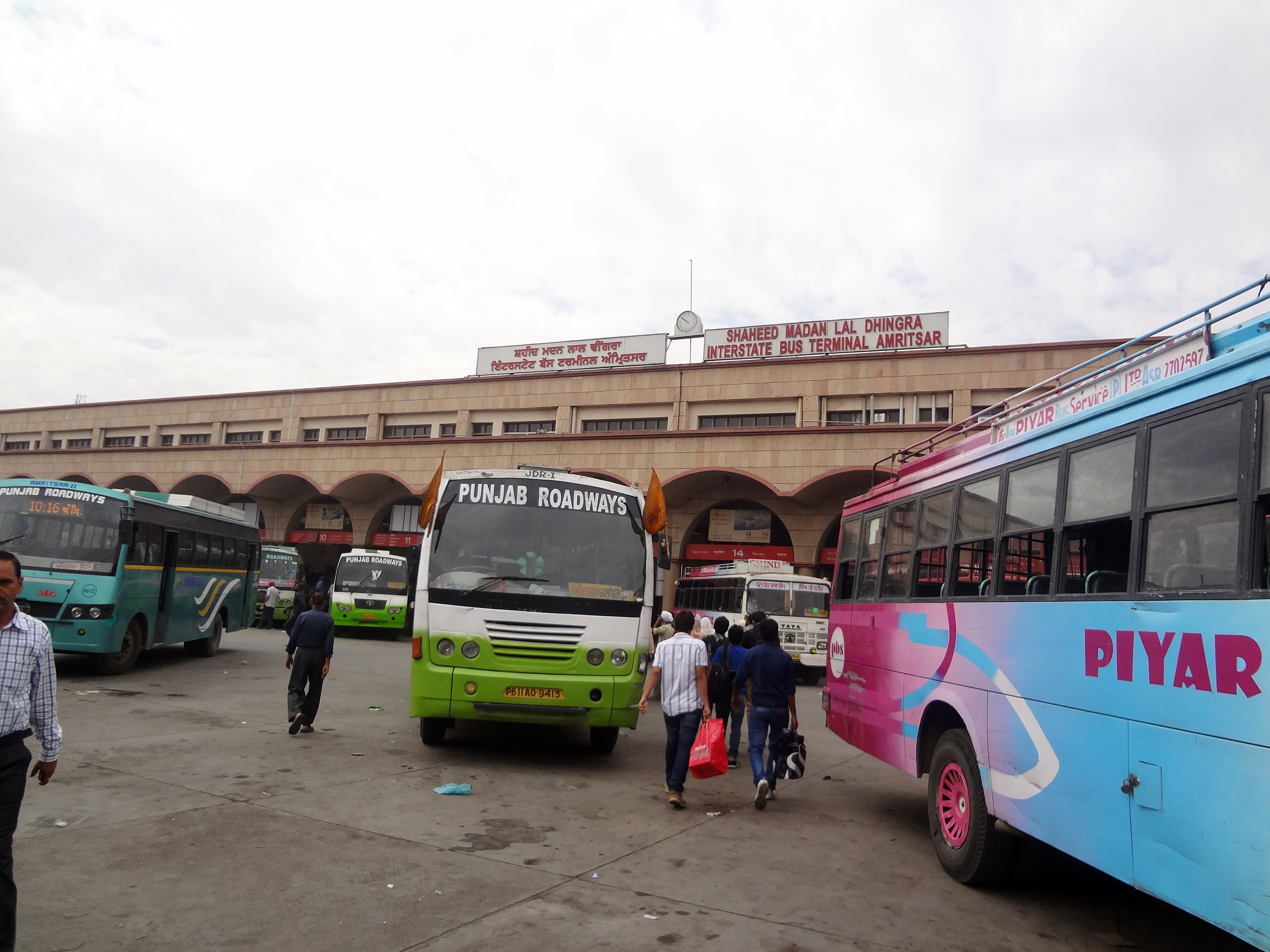
Amritsar Inter State Bus Stand

Amritsar has a bus rapid transit service, the Amritsar Metrobus which was launched on 28 January 2019. 93 fully air-conditioned Tata Marcopolo buses are used for the service connecting places like

- Golden Temple
- Jallianwala Bagh
- Guru Nanak Dev University
- Golden Gate
- India Gate, Amritsar
- Durgiana Temple
- Khalsa College

== Educational institutions ==
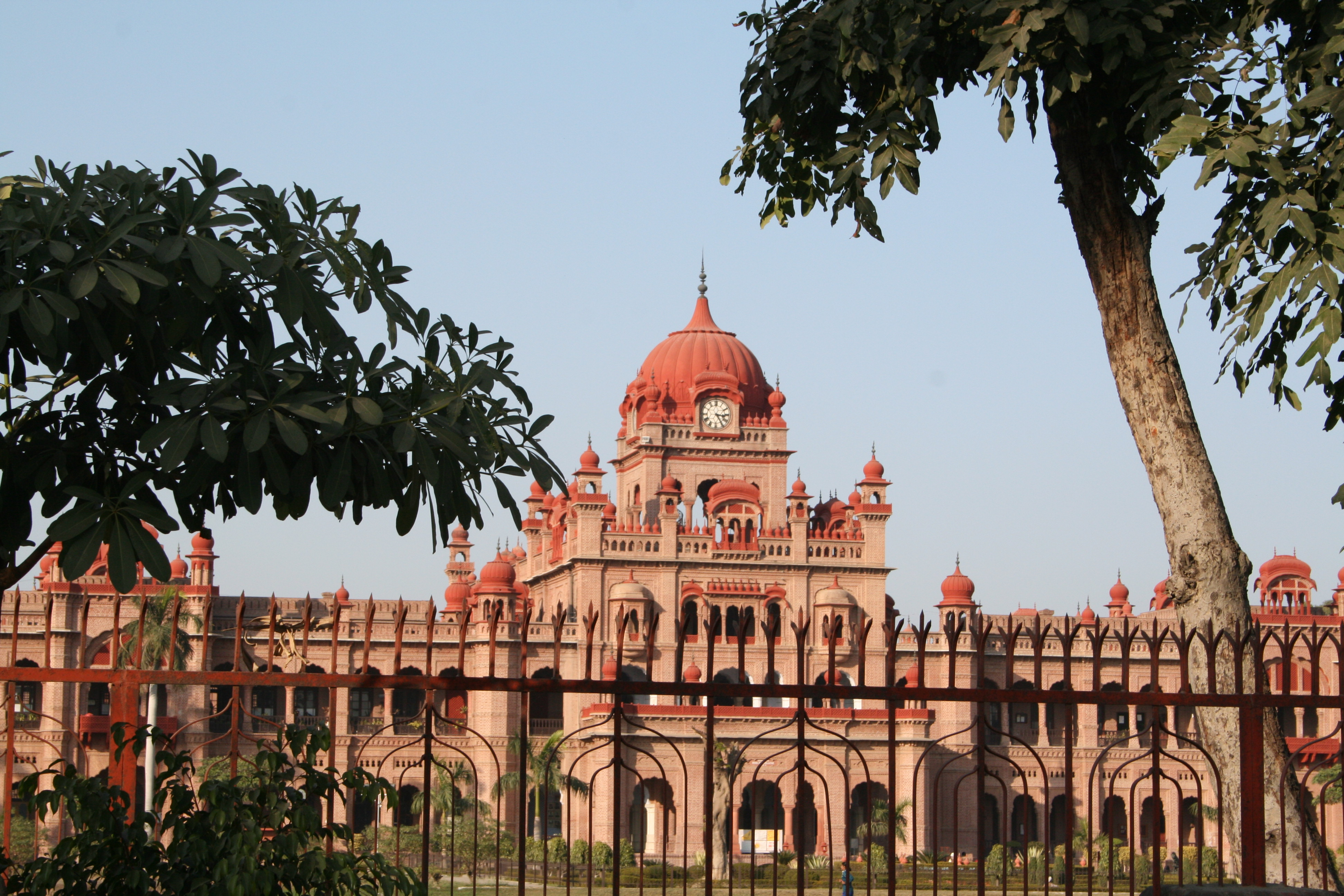
Khalsa College

- BBK DAV College for Women
- D.A.V College
- D.A.V Public School
- Delhi Public School
- Government Medical College
- Guru Nanak Dev University
- Khalsa College
- Khalsa College of Law
- Indian Institute of Management
- Spring Dale Senior School

== Sister cities ==
The following cities are sister cities of Amritsar:

- Bakersfield, California, United States
- Sandwell, West Midlands, England, United Kingdom
- Thetford, Norfolk, England, United Kingdom

== See also ==
- List of people from Amritsar
- Amritsar Ring Road
- Amritsar train disaster, a major accident that occurred during Dussehra 2018
- Tarn Taran District
- Sports facilities:
  - Gandhi Sports Complex Ground, cricket stadium
