= Chogawan =

Village in Punjab, India

Coordinates: 31°40′N 75°06′E

Chogawan (Village ID 37508) village, the headquarters of Chogawan block is situated in Amritsar district, Punjab, India, around 20 km North West of Amritsar city. According to the 2011 census the village has a population of 2342 living in 448 households. Its main agriculture product is wheat growing.

The Chogawan block has a population of 148134 persons with around 27% of its population belonging to the Scheduled Castes. It has a low literacy rate of 59% as compared to 77% literacy rate of Amritsar district. The block has no industry and is infrastructurally backward as compared to other parts of the district. Majority of its population is engaged in farming. Chogawan is a predominantly rural block with 113 villages and shares a large border with neighbouring country Pakistan. A big chunk of the Mazhabi population are migrated from Muridke and Kamoke of Pakistan, as refugees in 1947. On the other hand the native Arain and Muslim Gujjar population of the city went to Pakistan and settled mainly in Sialkot.

== See also ==
- Sarangra
