= Verka Junction railway station =

Train station in Punjab, India

Verka Junction

General information
- Location: Station Rd., Verka, Amritsar, Punjab; India
- Coordinates: 31°39′58″N 74°55′57″E
- Elevation: 233 metres (764 ft)
- System: Indian Railways junction station
- Owner: Indian Railways
- Operator: Northern Railway
- Lines: Amritsar–Pathankot line Verka–Dera Baba Nanak line Amritsar–Jammu main line
- Platforms: 2
- Tracks: 3 nos 5 ft 6 in (1,676 mm) broad gauge

Construction
- Structure type: Standard on ground
- Parking: Yes
- Accessible: No

Other information
- Status: Functioning
- Station code: VKA
- Division(s): Firozpur

History
- Electrified: No (In progress)

Passengers
- 2018: 1343 per day
Location
- Location within Punjab Location within India

Verka Junction (station code: VKA) is located in Amritsar district in the Indian state of Punjab and serves Verka town, which is a suburb of Amritsar city. Verka station falls under Firozpur railway division of Northern Railway zone of Indian Railways.

== Overview ==
Verka Junction railway station is located at an elevation of 233 metres (764 ft). This station is located on the single track, 5 ft 6 in (1,676 mm) broad gauge, Amritsar–Pathankot line which was established in 1884. Verka station is also the junction and origin station for single track Verka–Dera Baba Nanak line.

== Electrification ==
Verka railway station is situated on single track DMU Amritsar–Pathankot line and single track DMU Verka–Dera Baba Nanak line. It was reported in April 2019 that the electrification of the single track BG Amritsar–Pathankot line had commenced and the survey for electrification of Verka–Dera Baba Nanak line had started.

== Amenities ==
Verka railway station has 1 booking windows, no enquiry office and just very basic amenities like drinking water, public toilets, sheltered area with adequate seating etc. The station had small footfall of 1343 persons per day in 2018 and wheelchair availability was not there for disabled persons. There are two platforms at the station but no foot overbridge (FOB).
