= List of cities in Punjab, India by population =

This is a list of urban agglomerations with a population above 100,000 as per 2011 census and development ranking in Punjab.

Cities in Punjab, India
Rank	Name	District	Image	Type*	Population 2022	Population 2011	Male	Female	Population below 5 yrs	Literacy Rate
1	Ludhiana	Ludhiana		UA	1,917,000	1,618,879	950,123	743,530	173,021	85.36
2	Amritsar	Amritsar		UA	1,425,000	1,183,705	874,773	739,105	63,238	84.64
3	Jalandhar	Jalandhar		UA	1,053,895	873,725	463,975	409,970	84,886	85.46
4	Patiala	Patiala		UA	736,305	446,246	236,198	210,048	42,458	89.95
5	Bathinda	Bathinda		UA	368,000	285,813	151,782	134,031	30,713	82.84
6	Mohali	Mohali		UA	334,205	166,864	87,380	79,484	13,820	91.96
7	Moga	Moga		City	226,973	168,443	88,290	80,153	16,836	89.11
8	Batala	Gurdaspur		City	198,481	158,404	83,536	74,868	14,943	89.28
9	Pathankot	Pathankot		UA	195,365	147,875	79,145	68,730	14,734	88.71
10	Firozpur	Firozpur		City	194456	146,897	79,808	67,089	16,447	81.42
11	Abohar	Fazilka	—N/a	City	175,988	145,238	76,840	68,398	15,870	79.86
12	Malerkotla	Malerkotla		City	169,578	135,238	71,401	63,929	16,315	70.25
13	Khanna	Ludhiana		City	168,876	128,130	67,811	60,319	13,218	84.43
14	Phagwara	Kapurthala		City	167,785	117,954	62,171	55,783	11,622	87.43
15	Kapurthala	Kapurthala		City	164,745	101,654	55,485	46,169	9,706	85.82
16	Rajpura	Patiala		City	162,644	112,193	57,803	54,390	12,841	82.00
18	Muktsar	Muktsar		City	147,679	117,085	62,005	55,080	13,639	77.31
17	Hoshiarpur	Hoshiarpur		City	156,987	110,091	58,401	51,690	11,516	90.75
19	Faridkot	Faridkot		City	137,605	110,694	58,485	52,169	9,706	85.82
20	Barnala	Barnala	—N/a	City	136,874	116,454	62,302	54,152	12,984	79.80
21	Mukerian	Hoshiarpur		City	129,876	89,043	46,931	41,112	9,027	83.54
* UA=Urban Agglomeration

== Urban Agglomeration ==
In the census of India 2011, an Urban Agglomeration has been defined as follows:

"An urban agglomeration is a continuous urban spread constituting a town and its adjoining outgrowths (OGs), or two or more physically contiguous towns together with or without outgrowths of such towns. An Urban Agglomeration must consist of at least a statutory town and its total population (i.e. all the constituents put together) should not be less than 20,000 as per the 2001 Census. In varying local conditions, there were similar other combinations which have been treated as urban agglomerations satisfying the basic condition of contiguity."

=== Constituents of Urban Agglomerations in the Punjab ===
The constituents of Urban Agglomerations in the Punjab, with a population of 1 lakh or above, are noted below:

- Amritsar Urban Agglomeration includes Amritsar (M Corp.), Nangli (CT), Mudal (CT), Bara Khankot Doburjee (OG), Village Mule Chak (OG), Abadi Baba Darshan Singh on Ram Tirath Road (OG), Abadi Baba Jiwan Singh on Ram Tirath Road (OG), Abadi along Khairabad on Ram Tirath Road to Ajnala Road (OG), Village Roriwala (OG), Prem Nagar on Ajnala Road (OG), Abadi Mirankot on Ajnala Road (OG), Gumtala Colony on Jagdev Kalan Road (OG), Ranjit Vihar (OG), Naushera Khurd (OG), Parti Vihar (OG), Abadi Naushera (OG), Silver Estate (OG), Krishna Lane (OG), Vill Bhagatpura( Factories on right side of Doburjee G.T Road ) (OG), Abadi Khalsa Nagar near Kot Mit Singh (OG), Village Kuriwal (OG), Thandewala (OG), Basarka Bhaini (Attari Road) (OG), Village Ghumanpura (OG), Joshi Colony, Ram Tirath Road (OG), Raggar Colony, Gali No. 1,2 & 3, and Ram Tirath Road (OG).
- Jalandhar UA includes Jalandhar (M Corp.), Khambra (CT), Alipur adjacent to Village Mithapur (OG), Nangal Karkhan adjacent to Master Mehnga Singh Colony (OG) and Bidhipur on Amritsar Road (OG).
- Patiala UA includes Patiala (M Corp.), Ranjit Nagar Extension- 1 (OG), Grid Colony PSEB on Bhadson Road (OG), Kheri Gujran (OG), Urban Estate- I (OG), Punjabi University (OG), Urban Estate- II (OG) and Ranjit Nagar Extension- II (OG).
- Mohali UA includes Mohali (M Corp.), Sector - 66 (OG), Sector - 67 (OG), Sector - 68 (OG), Sector - 69 (OG) and Sohana (CT).
- Batala UA includes Batala (M Cl), Bhode- di- Khui (OG) and Kharal (OG).
- Pathankot UA includes Pathankot (M Corp.), Khanpur(OG), Lamin (OG) and Dhaki (CT).
- Moga UA includes Moga (M Corp.), Landeke (Amritsar Road) (OG) and Duneke (Firozpur Road) (OG).
- Phagwara UA includes Phagwara (M Corp.) and Phagwara Sharki (CT).

Abbreviations: M Corp. = Municipal Corporation, M = Municipality, CT = Census Town, OG = Out Growth, NA = Notified Area, CB = Cantonment Board

== Urban Agglomeration constituents ==
Urban Agglomerations constituents with a population above 100,000 as per 2011 census are shown in the table below.

Urban Agglomeration	Name of Constituent	District	Image	Type*	Population 2011	Male	Female	Population below 5 yrs	Literacy Rate
Amritsar	Amritsar	Amritsar		M Corp	1,132,761	602,754	530,007	109,540	85.27
Jalandhar	Jalandhar	Jalandhar		M Corp	862,196	458,015	404,181	83,669	85.50
Patiala	Patiala	Patiala		M Corp.	445,196	236,238	208,958	42,458	89.95
Mohali	Mohali	Mohali		M Corp.	146,104	76,441	69,663	13,155	93.22
Batala	Batala	Gurdaspur		M Corp.	151,400	79,459	71,941	14,698	85.49
Pathankot	Pathankot	Pathankot		M Corp.	143,357	74,833	68,524	13,496	88.60
Moga	Moga	Moga		M Corp.	141,432	73,760	67,672	15,502	82.09
Firozpur	Firozpur	Firozpur		M Corp.	110,091	58,401	51,690	11,516	79.75

== See also ==
- List of cities in Punjab, Pakistan by population
