= Nexus Amritsar =

Shopping mall in Amritsar, Punjab, India

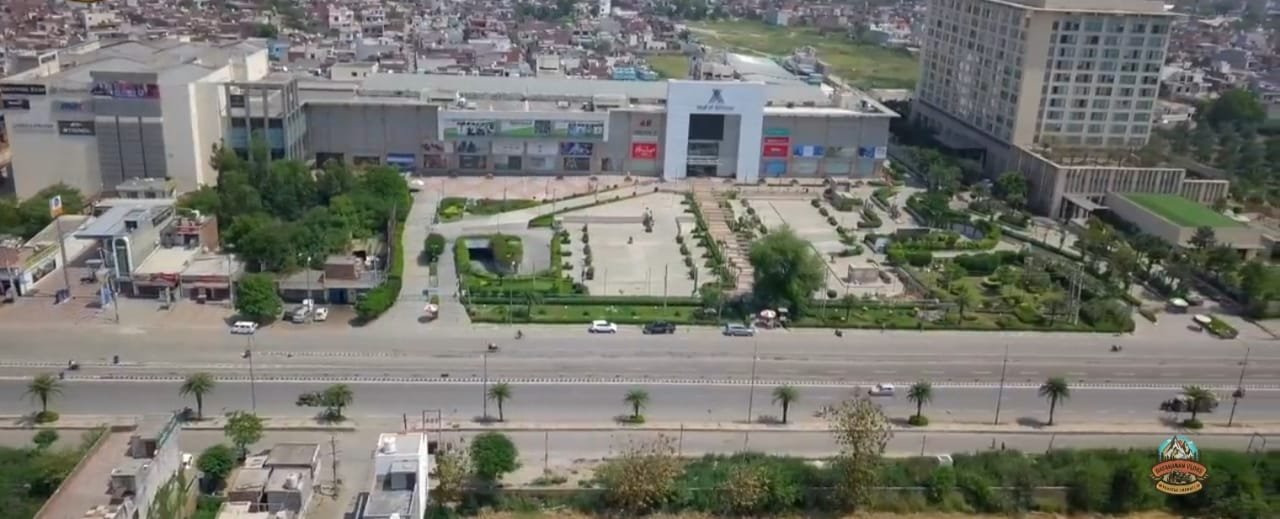
- Nexus Amritsar
- Location: Amritsar, Punjab, India
- Address: MBM Farms, Sultanwind Suburban, GT Road, Rajinder Nagar, Amritsar
- Opened: 2009
- Developer: Alpha G Group
- Owner: The Blackstone Group
- Num. of stores: 100+
- Floor area: 535,241 sq ft (49,725.5 m^{2})
- Floors: 5
- Parking: Valet parking
- Public transit: Amritsar Metrobus
- Website: www.nexusselecttrust.com/nexus-amritsar#overview

Nexus Amritsar (previously known as Mall of Amritsar and Alpha One Mall) is a shopping mall situated on GT Road, Amritsar, Punjab, India developed by Alpha G Group and is the third largest mall in the Indian State of Punjab. The mall covering five floors, including 250+ brands and is spread over a total area of two million square feet (190,000 m^{2}) with gross sizeable area of about 535,241 sq ft (49,725.5 m^{2}).

== Construction ==
The Mall was designed by ARCOP and opened to public in 2009. The mall was located closely to the New Amritsar economic zone. The complex of mall also hosts the 5 star luxury hotel Hyatt Regency Amritsar which stands adjacent to the building of the mall. The hotel, with over 248 rooms is one of the largest hotels in the city.

== Acquisition ==
Alpha G Group, the original developer of the mall later sold the mall to Blackstone in December 2015 along with its Alpha One Mall, Ahmedabad which rebranded the mall to "Mall of Amritsar" for a deal costing Rs. 800 Crore.
