= Rayya, Amritsar =

Rayya Rayya
- city
- Location in Punjab, India Rayya (India)
- Coordinates: 31.54°N 75.23°E
- Country: India
- State: Punjab
- District: Amritsar
- Elevation: 0 m (0 ft)

Population (01-03-2011)
  - Total: 19,567

Languages
  - Official: Punjabi
- Time zone: UTC+5:30 (IST)
- PIN: 143112
- Telephone code: 01853
- Vehicle registration: PB-17

Rayya is a city and municipality in Amritsar district in the Indian state of Punjab. Rayya is about 35 km from Amritsar, 45 km from Jalandhar and 5 km from the Beas River.

Political parties like Indian National Congress have also been in power but not as frequently as the Shiromani Akali Dal Party.

== Notable people ==
Notable individuals from Rayya in terms of Punjab’s politics include:

- Jiwan Singh Umranangal – Politician and senior leader of the Shiromani Akali Dal, served as Punjab’s Revenue Minister (1968) and Finance Minister (1977).

== Demographics ==
The table below shows the population of different religious groups in Rayya town, as of 2011 census.

Population by religious groups in Rayya town, 2011 census
Religion	Total	Female	Male
Sikh	10,284	4,964	5,320
Hindu	4,042	1,873	2,169
Christian	92	41	51
Muslim	72	37	35
Jain	4	3	1
Other religions	2	0	2
Not stated	10	5	5
Total	14,506	6,923	7,583
