= Budha Theh =

- Census town
- Location in Punjab, India Budha Theh (India)
- Coordinates: 31.5432°N 75.2913°E
- Country: India
- State: Punjab
- District: Amritsar

Population (2001)
  - Total: 8,730

Languages
  - Official: Punjabi
- Time zone: UTC+5:30 (IST)

Budha Theh is a census town in Amritsar district in the state of Punjab, India.

== Demographics ==
As of 2001 India census, Budha Theh had a population of 8,730. Males constitute 56% of the population and females 44%. Budha Theh has an average literacy rate of 72%, higher than the national average of 59.5%; with male literacy of 79% and female literacy of 63%. 12% of the population is under 6 years of age.

The table below shows the population of different religious groups in Budha Theh, as per the 2011 census.

Population by religious groups in Budha Theh town, 2011 census
Religion	Total	Female	Male
Sikh	5,970	2,858	3,112
Hindu	4,553	1,768	2,785
Christian	378	199	179
Muslim	73	27	46
Buddhist	1	0	1
Not stated	4	1	3
Total	10,979	4,853	6,126
