= Sarangra =

- Location within Punjab Location within India
- Coordinates: 31.08°N 75.50°E
- Country: India
- Province: Punjab
- Elevation: 224 m (735 ft)
- Time zone: UTC+5:30 (IST)

Sarangra is a village in Chogawan-2 Tehsil in Amritsar District of Punjab State, India. It is located 33 km to the west of District headquarters Amritsar. 8 km from Chogawan-2. 275 km from State capital Chandigarh

Sarangra Pin code is 143110 and postal head office is Preet Nagar (Amritsar).

Odhar (3 km), Kakar (4 km), Manj (4 km), Bachiwind (4 km), Lopoke (5 km) are the nearby villages to Sarangra. Sarangra is surrounded by Harsha Chhina Tehsil to the east, Ajnala-1 Tehsil to the east, Gandiwind-9 Tehsil to the south, Amritsar Tehsil to the east.

Amritsar, Tarn Taran, Patti, Batala are the nearby cities to Sarangra.

== Demographics ==
Punjabi is the local language.
