= Verka Town =

Suburb of Amritsar, India

Verka
- Suburb
- Location in Punjab, India Verka (India)
- Coordinates: 31°39′54″N 74°55′48″E
- Country: India
- City: Amritsar
- State: Punjab
- District: Amritsar

Languages
  - Official: Punjabi
- Time zone: UTC+5:30 (IST)
- Website: amritsar.nic.in

Verka is a suburb located in the Amritsar district of Punjab state, India. It is located on Batala Road and is situated on the northern part of Amritsar. Post code for Verka town is 143501. The famous milk plant Verka was named after the name of the town in 1973. Verka Railway Station is being electrified.

== Attractions ==
- Sun City Amusement and Water Park
- Gurudwara Nanaksar
- Verka Milk Plant
- Shri Guru Nanak dev Ji Charitable Hospital

== Education ==
There are many schools and colleges located in Verka for catering the educational needs of students residing in the suburb. They are as follows:

- DAV International School
- Junior Model High School
- Government Senior Secondary School
- Ryan Public School
- Oxford Public School
- Dashmesh Public School
- Har Public School
- Guru Nanak Dev University College
- Anand College of Education for Women
- Global Institute of Technology
- Greenwood public School

== Verka Junction railway station ==
Verka Junction is Connected To Amritsar, Pathankot and Gurdaspur Directly With passenger as well as Mail/Express Trains. Dera Baba Nanak Route Originates From Verka Junctions, with regular running Dmu's. Amritsar-Pathankot Railway Line in under electrification, which is expected to be completed in 1 year.

=== [trains to stations] ===
1) Pathankot

2) Jammu

3) Katra

4) Dera Baba Nanak

5) Amritsar

6) Bathinda

[Mail/Express Trains]

1)Jammu tawi-Rourkela Express

2)Jammu tawi-Sambhalpur Express

3)Katra-Ahmedabad Weekly Express

4)Delhi-Pathankot Superfast Express

5)Jammi tawi-Bathinda-Veraval-Ahmedabad Somnath Express

6)Ravi Express
