= Punjab State Power Corporation =

Indian government company

Punjab State Power Corporation Ltd. (PSPCL)
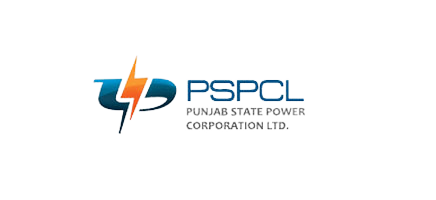
- Type: Government-owned corporation
- Industry: Electric power distribution and electricity generation
- Founded: 2010
- Headquarters: Patiala, Punjab, India
- Key people: Er. Baldev Singh Sran (Chairman & Managing Director)
- Products: Electricity
- Owner: Government of Punjab
- Number of employees: 43276 (2020–21)
- Website: www.pspcl.in

Punjab State Power Corporation Limited (PSPCL) is the electricity generating and distributing state-owned company of the Punjab state in India. It was formerly known as Punjab State Electricity Board (PSEB) which was unbundled by the government of Punjab into two companies on 16 April 2010 as Punjab State Power Corporation Ltd. (POWERCOM) and Punjab State Transmission Corporation Ltd. (TRANSCO).

== History ==
PSPCL was incorporated as company on 16 April 2010 and was given the responsibility of operating and maintenance of State's own generating projects and distribution system. The business of generation of power of erstwhile PSEB was transferred to PSPCL. The Last chairman [cmd] of pseb is H.S BRAR .

== Power plants ==
=== Thermal ===
- Rajpura Thermal Power Plant, Rajpura. It is a Case-2 based most efficient and top of the MERIT order thermal power plant in Punjab, with power capacity of 1400 MW (700x2).
- Talwandi Sabo Power Project, Mansa. It is the highest capacity thermal power plant in Punjab, with power capacity of 1980 MW (660x3).
- Guru Nanak Dev Thermal Plant, Bhatinda. It was a 460 MW (110x2 + 120x2 MW) coal-based thermal power plant. (closed)
- Guru Gobind Singh Super Thermal Power Plant, Ropar. It is a 1260 MW (6x210 MW) coal-based thermal power plant.
- Guru Hargobind Thermal Plant, Lehra Mohabbat, Bhatinda. It is a 920 MW (2x210 MW, 2x250 MW) coal-based thermal power plant.
- Goindwal Sahib Power Plant. It is a 540MW coal based thermal power plant.

=== Hydel ===
- Ranjit Sagar Dam, 600 MW
- Shanan Power House. It is a 110 MW hydro power plant.
- Anandpur Sahib Hydel Channel, 134 MW
- Mukerian Hydel, 207 MW
- UBDC Hydroelectric Power House, 45 MW
- Bhakra Nangal Project
- Pong Dam Project
- Dehar Power House
- Thein Dam Project
- Shahpur Kandi Project
