= Mall Wala =

Mall Wala Also spelled: Mal Wala, Mallwala, Malwala
- village
- Location in Punjab, India Mall Wala (India)
- Coordinates: 30.°N 74.°E
- Country: India
- State: Punjab
- Region: Punjab
- District: Bathinda
- Tehsil: Talwandi Sabo

Government
  - Type: Panchayat
- Elevation: 205 m (673 ft)

Population (2011)
  - Total: 2,737

Languages
  - Official: Punjabi
  - Regional: Punjabi
- Time zone: UTC+5:30 (IST)
- PIN: 151401
- Telephone code: 0164
- Vehicle registration: PB-
- Nearest city: Bathinda
- Sex ratio: 1000/910 ♂/♀
- Climate: BSh (Köppen)
- Avg. summer temperature: 43 °C (109 °F)
- Avg. winter temperature: 05 °C (41 °F)

Mall Wala, also spelled Mal Wala, Mallwala or Malwala, is a village of Talwandi Sabo tehsil of Bathinda district of Indian Punjab. The surrounding villages include Bhukhianwali.

== Geography ==
Mall Wala is approximately centred at 30.047262°N 74.907455°E. Located at nearly 205 meters (673 ft) above sea level, it is 23 kilometres (14 mi) from district headquarter, Bathinda. The surrounding villages include Bhukhianwali, Dunne Wala and Gurthari.

== Demographics ==
Punjabi is the mother tongue and Sikhism is the dominant religion of the village. As of 2011 census, it has total population of 2,737 with 531 households, 1,433 males and 1,304 females. The sex ratio is 910 females per thousand males, which is higher than the Punjabi sex ratio of 895, with children sex ratio of 914. The literacy rate is 60.86% with male literacy of 69.13% and female, 51.76%. The Schedule Caste constitutes 44.46% of the population with no Scheduled Tribe population.
