= Punjabi University Guru Kashi Campus =

- ਪੰਜਾਬੀ ਯੂਨੀਵਰਸਿਟੀ ਗੁਰੂ ਕਾਸ਼ੀ ਕੈਂਪਸ
- Motto: Punjabi: ਵਿਦਿਆ ਵੀਚਾਰੀ ਤਾਂ ਪਰਉਪਕਾਰੀ
- Motto in English: Education Empowers
- Type: Public State University
- Established: 1988; 38 years ago
- Parent institution: Punjabi University, Patiala
- Chancellor: Governor of Punjab
- Vice-Chancellor: Bhura Singh Ghuman
- Faculty: 110+
- Location: Talwandi Sabo, Bathinda district, Punjab, India; 29.977685°N 75.089356°E
- Campus: Rural, 85 acres
- Academic term: Semester
- Nickname: PUGKC
- Website: ycoe.punjabiuniversity.ac.in

Punjabi University Guru Kashi Campus (PUGKC) is a regional centre of Punjabi University, located at Talwandi Sabo, India. Its main constituents are Yadavindra College of Engineering, University School of Business Studies and Punjabi University Guru Kashi College.

== History ==
Punjabi University has named this campus Guru Kashi Campus, as this land was blessed by 10th Sikh Guru Guru Gobind Singh as Hamari Kanshi, a centre of higher learning in those times.

Punjabi University Guru Kashi College is the oldest institute running in this campus, which was founded by Sant Fateh Singh in year 1964. Punjabi University has taken over management control of this college on 20 December 1995 and later it was declared as a constituent college of university in 2001. University has established Guru Kashi Institute of Advanced Studies to run MBA/DCA courses in Guru Kashi Campus in September, 1988. Later, MCA and B.Tech. CSE courses were also added in this department in year 1998 and 2001 respectively. The department has been renamed as University School of Management. The department also conducted commerce and other computer courses such as PGDCA and M.Sc. (IT) along with three year off-campus MBA program.

University had started a unique Ph.D. off-campus program in Management from year 1998, but the course was discontinued in 2000 due to procedural lapses while introducing the course. University had also setup Guru Gobind Singh Institute of Information Technology in year 2001 through a private firm KCC Software Limited to offer various IT programs via distance education mode, which was later closed down.

Punjabi University has also established a degree level engineering college in year 2004 for providing subsidized education to rural students under Golden Hearts Scholarship. The already running MCA and B.Tech. CSE courses along with faculty and students were shifted to this newly created engineering institute and Management department has been renamed as University School of Business Studies.

== Religious connect ==
Talwandi Sabo is place of Takht Sri Damdama Sahib, one of the five Takhts or Seat of Temporal Authority of Sikhism. Punjabi University has set up this campus to contributing towards fulfilling the vision of Guru Gobind Singh to see this place as Hamari Kashi. The second objective in setting up this campus was the transformation of the educational scene in the heart of Malwa region of Punjab.

The local people of Talwandi Sabo donated 85 acres of land to start this institute on persuasion by Sant Fateh Singh. SGPC has also sanctioned an annual grant of Rs.1 Lakh for a period of 10 years for this noble cause.

== Campus ==
The campus is spread over 85 acres with high-rise buildings and pollution free environment.

=== Location ===
The campus is located on the outskirts of Talwandi Sabo on Raman road. YCoE is 1 km away from Talwandi Sabo Bus stand and 26 km from Bathinda. The Nearest Railway Station is Raman (station code: RMN) at a distance of 14 km.

=== Infrastructure & facilities ===
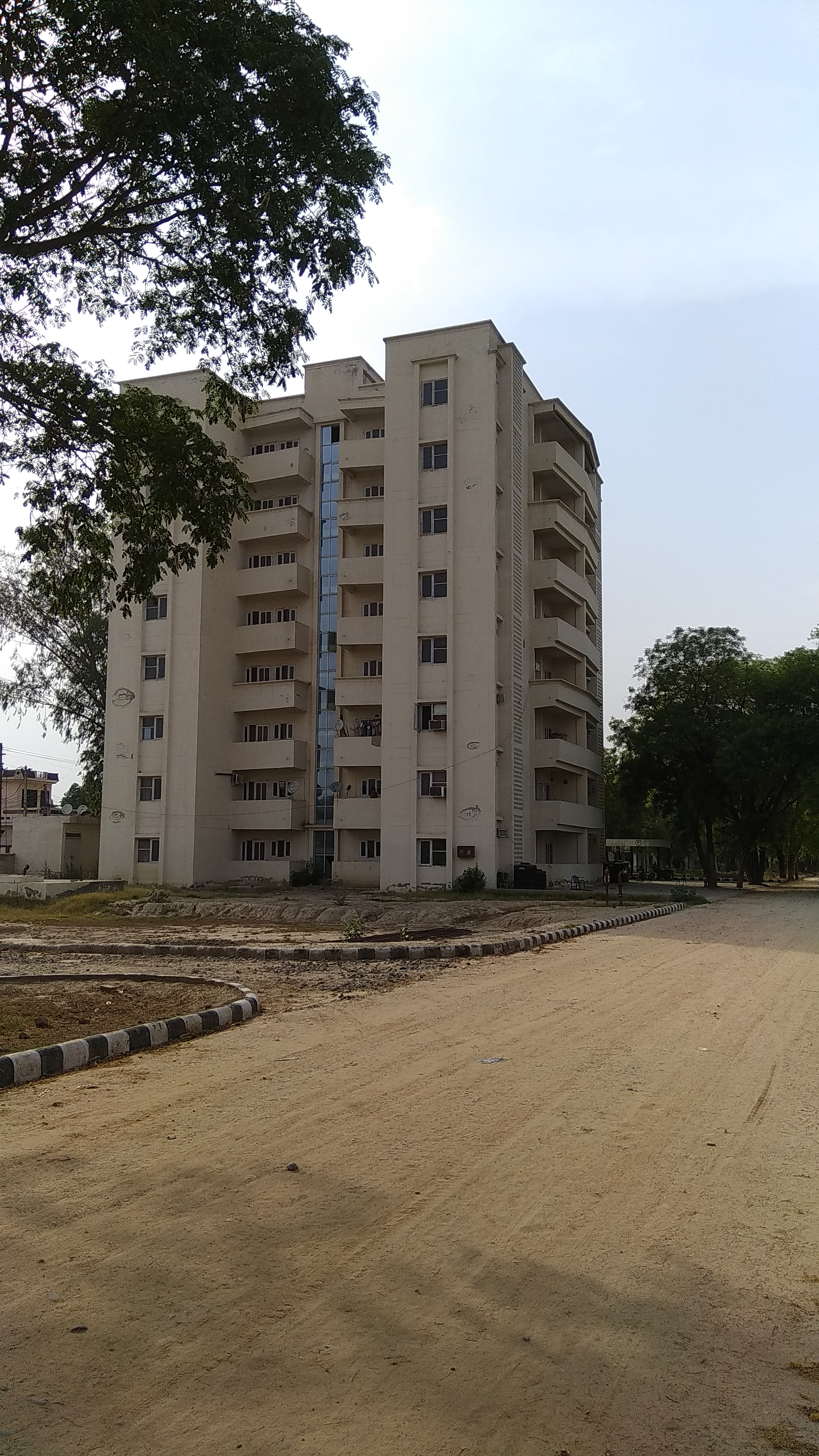
8-storey faculty apartments

University has provided all ultra modern facilities in this campus for benefit of students.

- Central Library
- Baba Deep Singh Boys Hostels (8-storey)
- Baba Ajit Singh Hansali wale Girls Hostel
- Staff Residential Flats
- Dr.Avtar Singh Guest House
- Bhagat Puran Singh Health Centre
- Canteen and Cafeteria
- Construction and Maintenance department
- Sports Stadium
- Plant nursery
- College transport

== Notable people ==
The Alumni of Guru Kashi Campus have found success in a variety of diverse fields including cultural, political, social-service, public and private sectors. The list contains Alumni and former faculty members of the campus.

- Parminder Singh Dhindsa
- Gurinder Sehmbey, CEO, StarAgri Finance Ltd.
- Manjit Singh, State Head (Haryana), Jio

== See also ==
- Yadavindra College of Engineering
- Guru Kashi College
- Punjabi University
