= Bhagwangarh =

Bhagwangarh Bhukhianwali
- village
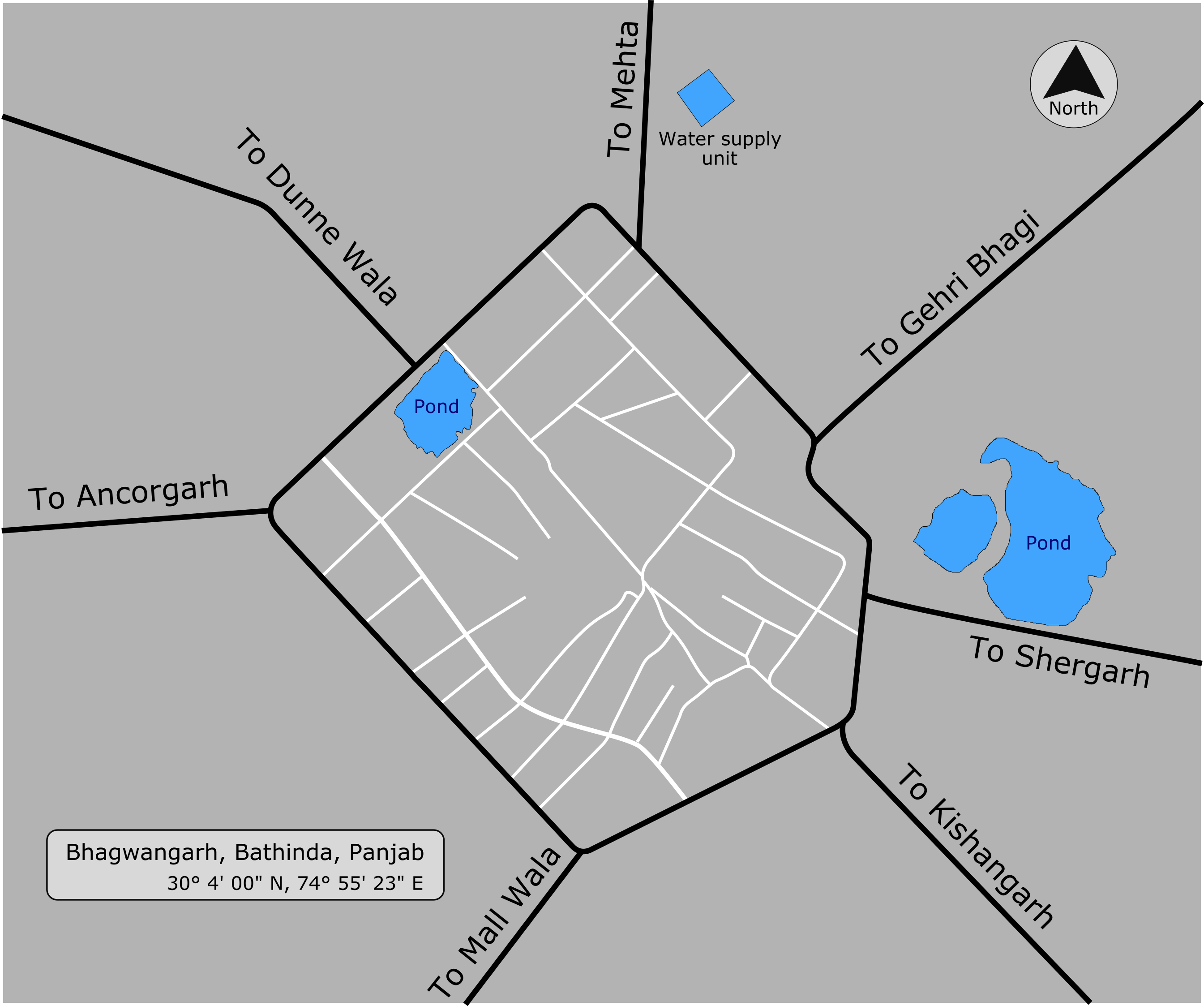
- Map of the village

- Location in Punjab, India Bhagwangarh (India)
- Coordinates: 30.066615°N 74.923069°E
- Country: India
- State: Punjab
- Region: Punjab
- District: Bathinda
- Tehsil: Talwandi Sabo

Government
  - Type: Panchayat
- Elevation: 205 m (673 ft)

Population (2011)
  - Total: 2,659

Languages
  - Official: Punjabi
  - Regional: Punjabi
- Time zone: UTC+5:30 (IST)
- PIN: 151401
- Telephone code: 01655
- Vehicle registration: PB-03
- Nearest city: Bathinda
- Sex ratio: 1000/882 ♂/♀
- Climate: BSh (Köppen)
- Avg. summer temperature: 43 °C (109 °F)
- Avg. winter temperature: 05 °C (41 °F)

Bhagwangarh, also known as Bhukhianwali, is a village of Talwandi Sabo tehsil of Bathinda district of Indian Punjab.

== Location ==
Bhagwangarh is surrounded by Bathinda Tehsil, Dabwali Tehsil, Giddedrbaha Tehsil and Lambi Tehsil.

== Geography ==
Bhagwangarh, a.k.a. Bhukhianwali, is approximately centered at 30.066672°N 74.923075°E. Located 205 meters (673 ft) above sea level, it is 23 kilometers (14 mi) from the district headquarter, Bathinda, and surrounding villages are Shergarh, Dunnewala and Mall Wala.

== Demographics ==
Punjabi is the mother tongue and Sikhism is the dominant religion of the village with other minorities. As of 2011 census, the total population of the village is 2659 with 546 households, 1413 males and 1246 females. The sex ratio is 882 females per 1000 males, with children sex ratio of 847. The literacy rate of the village is 61.85% with male literacy 69.50% and female, 53.20%. Jatt is dominant caste of the village with Schedule Caste (SC) constituting 34.45% of the population and no Schedule Tribe (ST) population.

== Transportation ==
The village is about 19 km from Bathinda and 232 km from Chandigarh. The nearest railway station is Sangat Rail Way Station.

== Nearby places ==
- Sangat Mandi
- Talwandi Sabo (Sri Damdma Sahib)
- Mandi Dabwali
- Giddarbaha
- Kalan Wali

== Post Offices ==
- Sangat. Pincode.151401
- Sirkibazar. Pincode.151005
- Bathinda. Pincode. 151001

== Education ==
- Guru Nanak College, Doomwali.
- Eastwood SChool, Doomwali.
- Mastermind school, Bangi Rughu.
- clay India international school.

== Personalities ==
Gurmel Singh Dhillon, a noted Punjabi songwriter are from this village.
