= Guru Hargobind Thermal Plant =

Thermal plant in India

- Country: India
- Location: Lehra Mohabbat (National Highway No. 64(New NH-07)), Bathinda to Barnala
- Coordinates: 30°16′03″N 75°09′52″E
- Status: Operational
- Owner: Punjab Government Power corporation
- Operator: Punjab State Power Corporation

Thermal power station
- Primary fuel: Coal from North Karanpura and Central Coal field Ltd and Light Diesel Oil
- Turbine technology: Thermal
- Cooling source: Sirhind Canal (Bhatinda Branch)

Power generation
- Units operational: 4 (2 x 210 MW single shaft reaction turbine + 2 x 250 MW)
- Nameplate capacity: 220.8 Lac units daily
- Annual net output: 2281 MUs

External links
- Website: www.pspcl.in/guru-hargobind-thermal-power-plant-lehra-mohabbat-bhatinda/

Guru Hargobind Thermal Plant (GHTP Lehra Mohabbat) is located on National Highway No. 7 (earlier NH 64) which runs from Bathinda to Chandigarh.

The Generators used are cylindrical rotor type, that were manufactured in India by BHEL.

Source of water is from Bhatinda Branch of Sirhind Canal.

== Capacity ==
It has an installed capacity of 920 MW.

Stage	Unit Number	Generating Capacity (MW)	Commissioned on	Status
First	1	210	June, 1999	Running
First	2	210	January, 1999	Running
Second	3	250	October, 2008	Running
Second	4	250	January, 2010	Running

== See also ==
- Guru Nanak Dev Thermal Plant
- Guru Gobind Singh Super Thermal Power Plant
