= Hansali =

Hansali Sahib, Fatehgarh Sahib
- Village
- Location in Punjab, India Hansali Sahib, Fatehgarh Sahib (India)
- Coordinates: 30.45°N 76.26°E
- Country: India
- State: Punjab
- District: Fatehgarh Sahib district

Hansali Sahib village is located in the tehsil of Fatehgarh Sahib in Fatehgarh Sahib district in the state of the Punjab, India. It is situated 11.5 km (7.1 mi) away from Fatehgarh Sahib, which is both district and sub-district headquarters for Hansali village. Governance of the village is by gram panchayat. The total geographical area of Hansali is 278 hectares (690 acres). Fatehgarh Sahib is also the nearest town to Hansali.

== Demographics ==
The total population of Hansali is 802 people in 160 separate houses. Hansali village has a female population which is 48.3% of the total. The village literacy rate is 74.6% overall. For males of reading age (over 6 years old) the rate is 77.4%; for females the comparable rate is 71.6%. The female to male literacy gap is 5.8%, which compares favourably to the overall gap for the Kera CD block, in which Hansali sits, of 9.04%.

== Location and surrounds ==
Hansali is in Fatehgarh Sahib tehsil, and in the Fatehgarh Sahib district of Punjab State, India. It is located 11.5 kilometres (7.1 mi) to the east of the district headquarters at Fatehgarh Sahib, 4 km (2.5 mi) from Khera, and 37 km (23 mi) from the state capital, Chandigarh.

Neighbouring the village are the surrounding locations of Fatehgarh Sahib and Sirhind tehsils, both to the west, Bassi Pathana to the north, and Rajpura to the east. Also nearby are the cities of Morinda, Kharar and Khanna, Ludhiana. Hansali lies on the border of two districts: the Fatehgarh Sahib District and the Nawanshahr District; it is very close to a third, Rupnagar district, formerly Ropar. Nawanshahr sub-district, and the ancient village of Saroya are to the north of Hansali.

== Notable people ==
=== Sant Ajit Singh Hansali ===
Baba Ajit Singh Hansaliwale Sahib (c. 1936 – 1 January 2015) (Note: Some sources, for example Hindustan Times, report his age as 75 when he died, while others (see Dainik Bhaskar), give his year of birth as 1936.) made his home in Hansali for many years, until his death on the first day of 2015. His birthplace was the village of Bharatgarh in the Ropar district. A widely-known and revered Sikh figure, and a Nirmala devotee, the Baba Sahib was head of the Nirmal Dera trust. The trust sets up community resources and runs charitable projects, including a free hospital, a school, and a girls' college and hostel on the Punjabi University Guru Kashi Campus.
