= Talwandi Sabo =

- Town
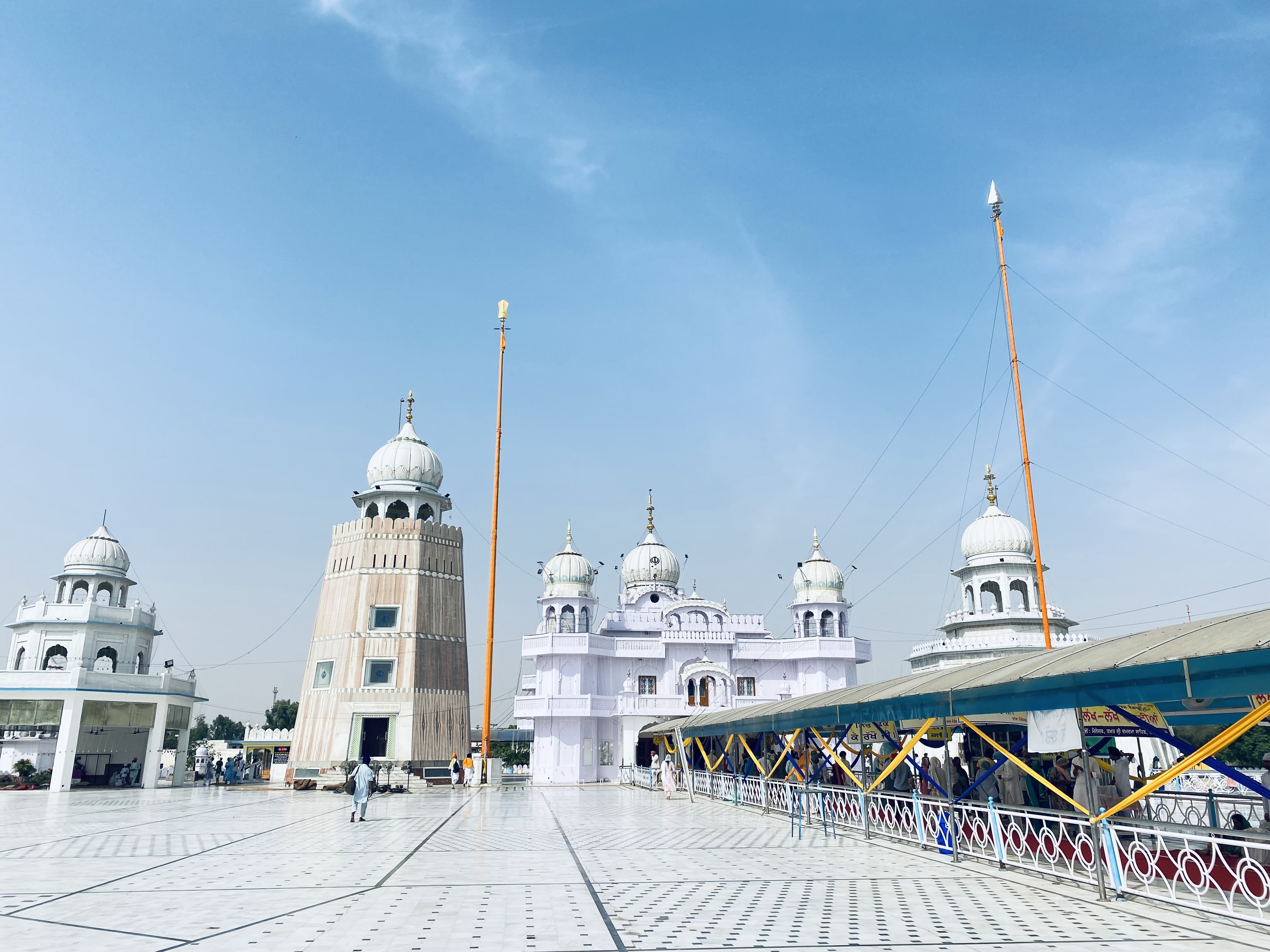
- Takht Sri Damdama Sahib

- Location in Punjab, India Talwandi Sabo (India)
- Coordinates: 29.988268°N 75.078678°E
- Country: India
- State: Punjab
- District: Bathinda

Population (2011)
  - Total: 20,589

Languages
  - Official: Punjabi (Gurmukhi)
  - Regional: Punjabi
- Time zone: UTC+5:30 (IST)
- PIN: 151302
- Vehicle registration: PB-45
- Nearest city: Bathinda

Talwandi Sabo (also known historically as Guru Kashi) is a town and Municipal Council, in Bathinda District, Punjab, India. It is famous for being the town in which one of the five Takhts of Sikhism where Takht Sri Damdama Sahib. It is also famous for its Baisakhi, which is celebrated on the 13th of April every year. It is a major cultural, transportation and agricultural centre, located in the Malwa region of Punjab. It is near the Punjab-Haryana border.

According to the 2011 census, the city had a population of 20,589. The Talwandi Sabo Power Project is named after this town and it provides lots of energy for the West Malwa area.

== History ==
Guru Gobind Singh established Damdama in 1705, where he remained for two years until his journey down south to Nanded. When Guru Gobind Singh came to Talwandi Sabo, he was accompanied by many Sikhs. As he moved further some Sikhs went with him while others returned back to their villages, and few even stayed in Talwandi Sabo to start their families. Their descendants still live around the Gurudwara Sahib today. Guru Gobind Singh blessed a man named Bhai Dalla Singh, and stated that the area, which was a sandy desert, would have canals flowing through it, many farms of oranges and pomegranates, and lots of vineyards. Bhai Dalla Singh also helped Guru Gobind Singh by sending his private force of 700 soldiers to assist him. He also said that it would be an area of education and business. Bhai Dalla Singh then established the Gurudwara of Damdama Sahib, where Baba Deep Singh then formed the Damdami Taksal; the primary Sikh learning institution.

In the British era many Sikh families travelled to this area to learn Sikhism. It was owned by the Talwandi Sabo family who were an aristocratic landowning family who were able to keep their Jagir by the British. In the 1950s-1980s many educational institutions developed in the era such as Guru Kashi College (Established in year 1964), Punjabi University Guru Kashi Campus, University School of Business Studies, Punjabi University, Yadavindra College of Engineering, Punjabi University, Akal University, established by Baru Sahib Trust and Guru Kashi University. There are also 111 schools in the village.

The main event that gave Talwandi Sabo a pedestal was in 18 November 1966; when Damdama Sahib was made a Takht Sahib and part of the Panj Takht by the Shiromani Gurdwara Parbandhak Committee, subsequently 17 Gurudwaras have been established.

== Demographics ==
Talwandi Sabo consists of 13 wards and as of 2011 it has a total population of 20,589 with 11,062 males and 9,527 females.

== See also ==
- Guru Gobind Singh Refinery
- Talwandi Sabo Power Project
