= Guru Kashi College =

- ਗੁਰੂ ਕਾਸ਼ੀ ਕਾਲਜ
- Type: Public
- Established: 1964; 62 years ago
- Affiliations: Punjabi University
- Principal: Dr.Anand Bansal
- Academic staff: 17
- Students: 1500
- Location: Talwandi Sabo, Punjab, India; 29.980°N 75.086°E
- Campus: rural
- Website: ucdamdama.punjabiuniversity.ac.in

Guru Kashi College is a constituent college of the Punjabi University in Talwandi Sabo, India. Established in 1964, it is one of the oldest college for arts and sciences in Malwa area of Punjab. It offers undergraduate and postgraduate programmes in sciences, humanities, social sciences, computer science and commerce.

== History ==
The college was founded by Sant Fateh Singh in year 1964 and has been named as Guru Kashi, as this land was blessed by 10th Sikh Guru Guru Gobind Singh as Hamari Kanshi, a centre of higher learning in those times.

Punjabi University has taken over management control of this college on 20 December 1995 and later it was declared as a constituent college of university in 2001. A new teaching block has been constructed by Bathinda Development Authority and handed over to college in November 2016.

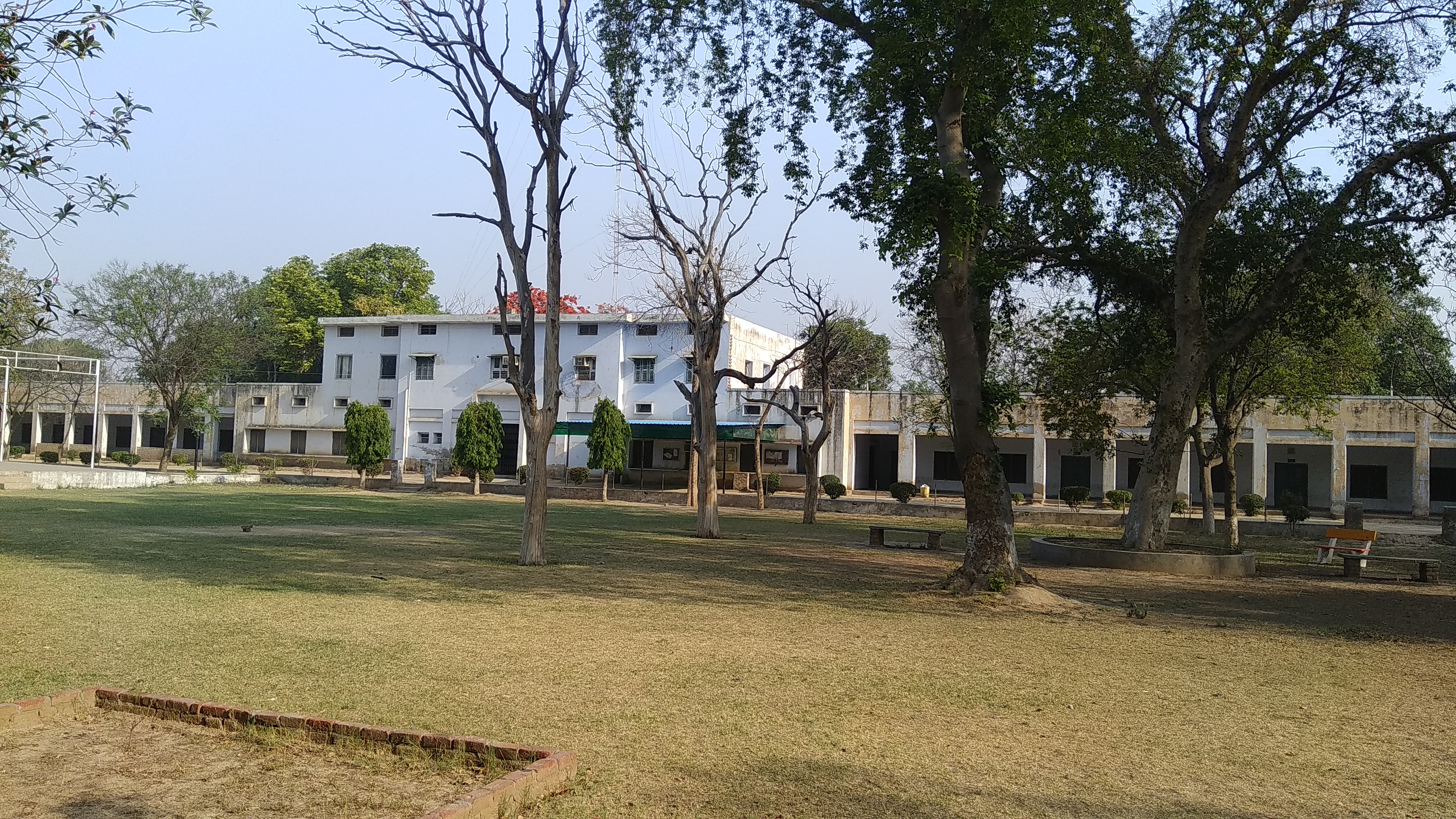
Main academic block

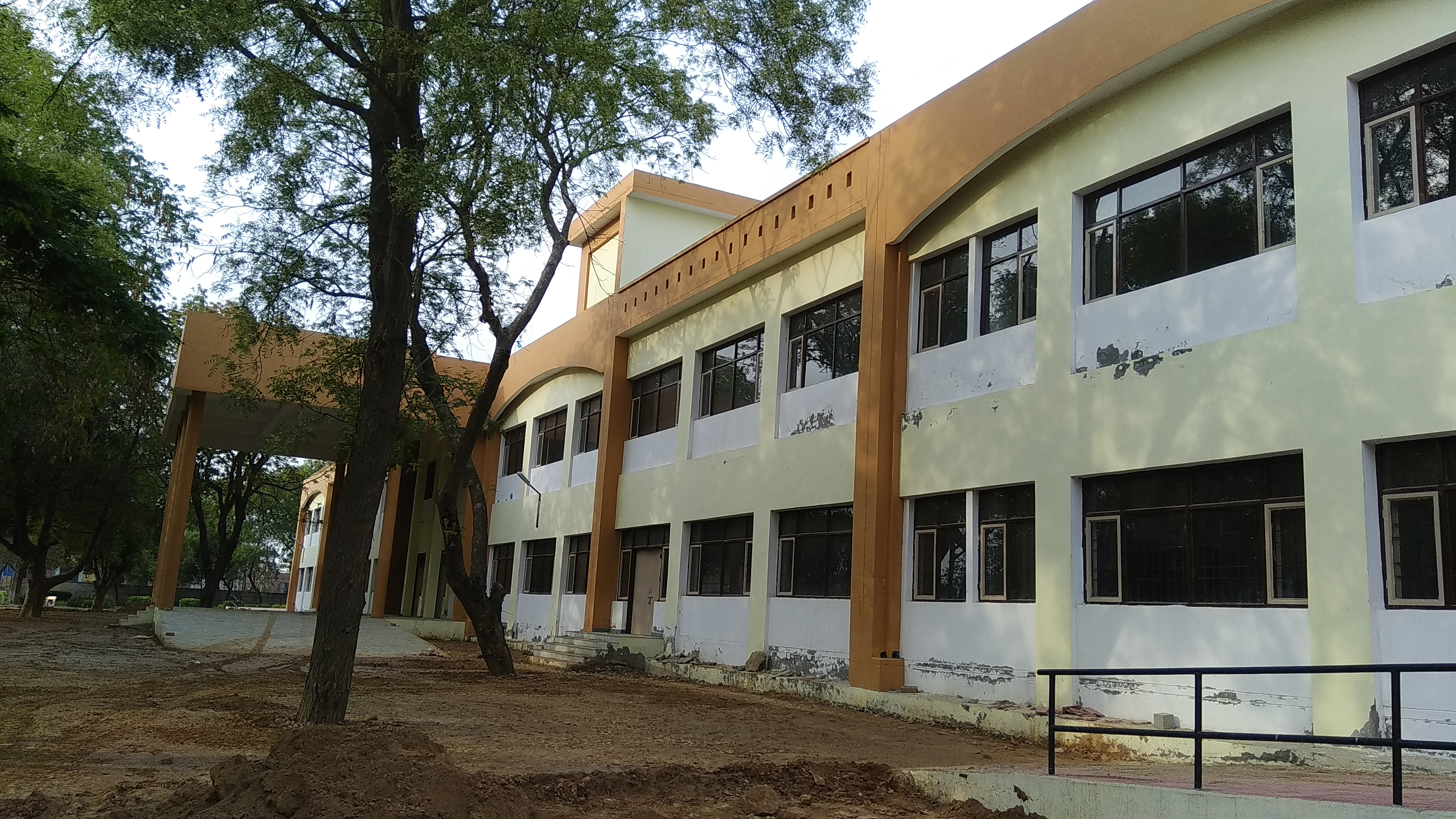
New teaching block constructed by BDA

== See also ==
- Yadavindra College of Engineering
- Punjabi University Guru Kashi Campus
