= Guru Nanak Dev Thermal Plant =

- Guru Nanak Dev Thermal Plant logo
- Country: India
- Location: Bathinda
- Coordinates: 30°14′04″N 74°55′32″E
- Status: Operation ceased
- Owner: Punjab State Power Corporation

Thermal power station
- Primary fuel: Coal
- Turbine technology: Thermal

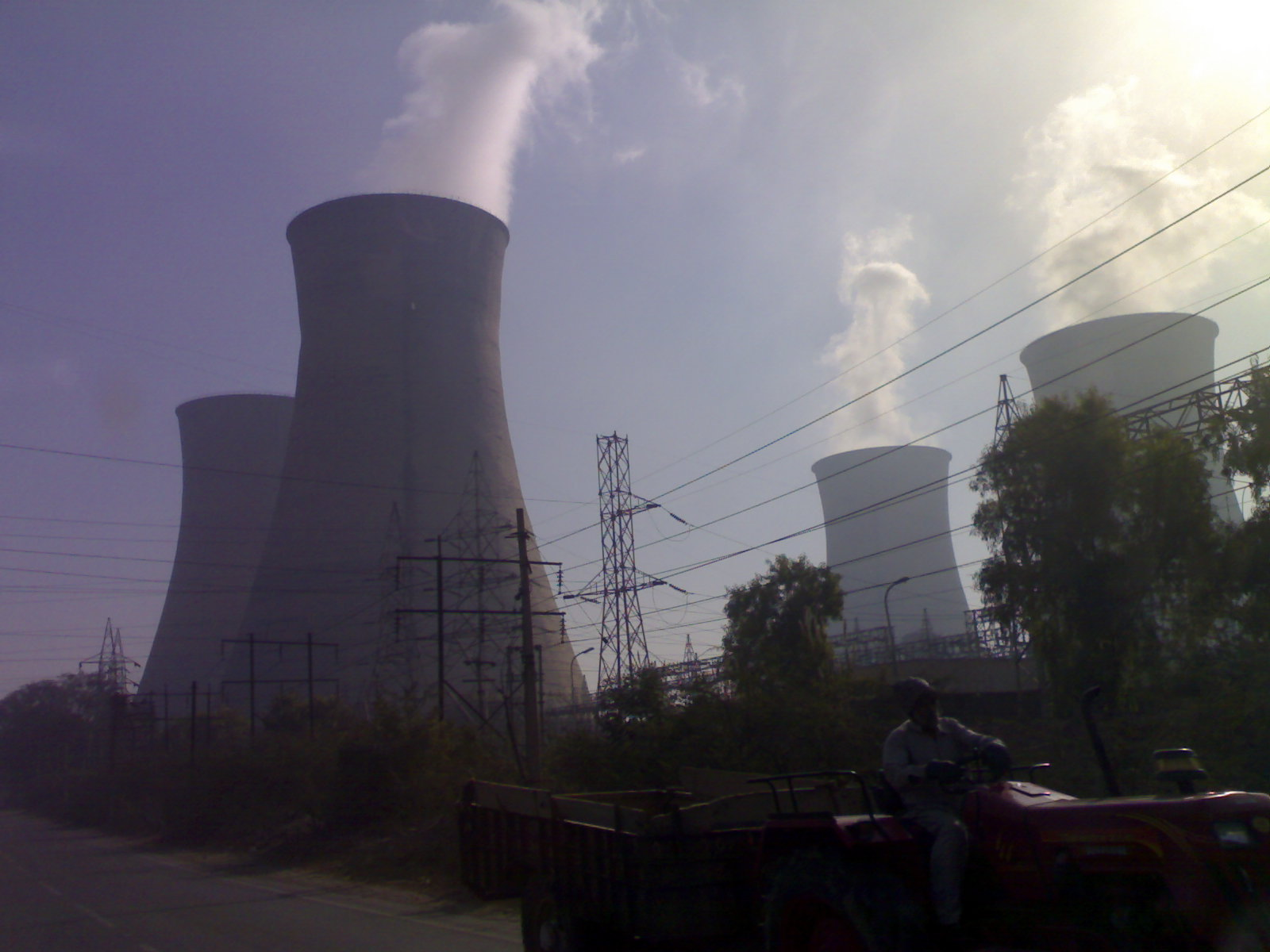
a view of thermal plant from NH 15

The Guru Nanak Dev Thermal Plant at Bathinda was one of the three coal-fired thermal power stations in Punjab (the other being at Lehra Mohabat and Ropar). It was a medium-sized power station with four units that were begun to be built in the early 1970s and completed in 1982. All total generate up to 460 MW (2x110+2x120 MW) of power that meets the irrigation needs of lower Punjab. Having generated electricity to meet the power demand of Punjab, the thermal plant shut down indefinitely on September 27, 2017.

The plant was named after the first Sikh guru and founder of Sikhism, Guru Nanak.

== Capacity ==
It had an installed capacity of 440 MW. All four units ceased operations in September 2017

Unit No.	Generating Capacity	Commissioned on	Status
1	110 MW	1974 September	Closed
2	110 MW	1975 September	Closed
3	120 MW	1978 March	Closed
4	120 MW	1979 January	Closed

== See also ==
- List of places named after Guru Nanak Dev
