= Talwandi Sabo Power Project =

Coal-based thermal power plant

Talwandi Sabo Power Limited (TSPL)
- Talwandi Sabo Power Limited logo
- Country: India
- Location: Bana Wala, Mansa, Punjab.
- Coordinates: 29°55′25″N 75°14′11″E
- Status: Operational
- Commission date: 2013
- Operator: PSPCL

Thermal power station
- Primary fuel: Coal

Power generation
- Units operational: 3
- Nameplate capacity: 1980.00 MW

Talwandi Sabo Power Project is a coal-based super-critical thermal power plant located in Banawala village in Mansa district in the Indian state of Punjab. The power plant is operated by Talwandi Sabo Power Limited (TSPL), a subsidiary of Vedanta.

== Capacity ==
Unit No.	Generating Capacity	Commissioned on	Status
1	660 MW	2013 November	Running
2	660 MW	2014 December	Running
3	660 MW	2016 August	Running
