= Guru Gobind Singh Super Thermal Power Plant =

Power station in India

- Location of the Guru Gobind Singh Super Thermal Power Plant in Punjab
- Country: India
- Location: Ropar, Punjab.
- Coordinates: 31°2′34.08″N 76°35′5.64″E
- Status: Operational
- Commission date: 1984
- Operator: PSPCL

Thermal power station
- Primary fuel: Coal

Power generation
- Units operational: 6
- Nameplate capacity: 1260.00 MW

Guru Gobind Singh Super Thermal Power Plant is located at Ghanauli near Ropar in Punjab. The power plant is one of the coal based power plants of PSPCL.

== Power plant ==
Guru Gobind Singh Super Thermal Power Station is situated near village Ghanauli on Ropar-Kiratpur Sahib National highway NH-21. It is about 12 km from Ropar and 55 km from Chandigarh. The plant has an installed capacity of 1260 MW. The first unit was commissioned in September, 1984. During March 1985, the second unit was commissioned and in later years four more units were added.

The station received the Incentive award for reducing fuel oil consumption in 1999.

The station also received the Shield and excellent performance by Prime minister of India during 1986-87 for achieving 70.08% PLF against then 53.2%. The plant has its source of water supply from Nangal Hydel Channel. The coal used mainly comes from mines in Bihar, West Bengal and Madhya Pradesh from more than 50 sources called collieries

== Installed capacity ==
It has an installed capacity of 1260 MW. But now total output left is 840 MW. The proposal to shut down the thermal power plant has been under consideration of the Government of Punjab. Another proposal is to build five supercritical thermal power plants of 800 MW each, which will replace the existing power units.

Stage	Unit Number	Installed Capacity (MW)	Date of Commissioning	Status
First	1	210	September, 1984	Not-Running
First	2	210	March, 1985	Not-Running
Second	3	210	March, 1988	Running
Second	4	210	January, 1989	Running
Third	5	210	March, 1992	Running
Third	6	210	March, 1993	Running
