= Bhanot =

Bhanot ([ɓáːnɔ́ʈ]) is a Punjabi Hindu surname, variously characterised as Brahmin, Chuhras, or Rajputs; they are also listed as a group of salutary guardsman to the Dogra rulers.

== Notable persons ==
Notable people with the surname include:

- Neerja Bhanot (1963–1986), Indian purser
- Shaleen Bhanot (born 1983), Indian actor
- Tarun Bhanot (born 1971), Indian politician
