= StarAgri =

Indian Agricultural Warehousing company

StarAgri Warehousing and Collateral Management Limited
- Industry: Agribusiness
- Founded: April 2006
- Headquarters: Mumbai, India
- Services: Agriculture Warehousing
- Number of employees: 2000+
- Website: www.staragri.com

StarAgri is an Agricultural cooperative established in 2006 by former ICICI Bank associates. The company provides services across the agricultural value chain, including warehousing, collateral management, procurement, trade facilitation, and financial services.

== History ==
StarAgri was established in 2006 by Suresh Goyal, Amit Goyal, Amith Agarwal, and Amit Khandelwal to develop warehousing capabilities for India’s agricultural sector.

In 2008, StarAgri expanded its services by introducing Collateral Management Systems (CMS) and Warehouse Receipt Financing (WRF) and started integrated lab testing services.

By 2012, StarAgri entered procurement and trade finance through its subsidiary, FarmersFortune (India) Private Limited. In 2015, it launched Agriwise Finserv, an NBFC platform offering Warehouse Receipt Financing.

In 2016, StarAgri introduced Agritrade, an e-marketplace for agricultural commodities. In 2019, it developed Agrigates, a warehouse management system designed to enable real-time tracking of commodity movements.

In 2021, StarAgri partnered with banks for co-lending and a data-driven platform offering crop advisory services using AI, ML, and remote sensing. In 2022, the company expanded globally to Africa, including Nigeria, Tanzania, Uganda, and Zambia

By 2023, StarAgri had a network of 1,380 warehouses across India, began operations in the Middle East, and integrated blockchain technology into CMS and WRF operations. In 2024, it introduced geo-tagging and cadastral mapping for farmland monitoring and completed a crop estimation project using remote sensing technology.

StarAgri has partnerships with 24 banks, including Canara Bank, Karnataka Bank, and Axis Bank, to provide financing to farmers and traders. In 2014, Temasek Holdings invested ₹250 crore, which was allocated for developing assets such as warehouses and logistics facilities.

== Operations and Service ==
StarAgri operates a network of 2,189 warehouses across 19 states in India, with a storage capacity of 5.2 MMT. The company's services include:

== Subsidiaries ==
- Agriwise Finserv Limited
- FarmersFortune (India) Private Limited
- Star Agribazaar Technology Private Limited
