= Saroya, Punjab =

Coordinates: 31.1770548°N 76.2315774°E

Saroya is a village in the tehsil town Balachaur, located in the Sahid Bhagat Singh District of Punjab, India. It is an ancient village tracing its roots to pre Independence era, when it was home to a majority of Muslim Ghorewaha Rajput Village. Even today houses from that era of Zaildars still exist here.
