= Akal University =

It is sikh religion University

- ਅਕਾਲ ਯੂਨੀਵਰਸਿਟੀ
- Type: Private University
- Established: 2015; 11 years ago
- Chancellor: Baba (Dr.) Davinder Singh ji
- Vice-Chancellor: Dr. Gurmail Singh
- Location: Talwandi Sabo, Bathinda, Punjab, Punjab, India; 29°58′18″N 75°05′20″E
- Campus: Rural, 100 acres (40 ha)
- Website: Akal University(official)
- Location within Punjab Location within India

Akal University is a private university in Talwandi Sabo, Bathinda, India. It is set up by Kalgidhar Society. It was established in 2015 under The Akal University Act, 2015 (Punjab Act No. 25 of 2015).

== History ==
Akal University was approved by State Government in March 2015. Inauguration of Akal University took place on 17 July 2015.

== Educational Programs ==
Akal University offers Bachelors as well as master's degree Honours programs in:

- Economics
- Political Science
- Commerce
- Mathematics
- Physics
- Chemistry
- Botany
- Zoology
- English
- Punjabi
- Management
- Social Science
- Computer Science and Engineering
- Education
- Sri Guru Granth Sahib Studies
