= Rajpura Thermal Power Plant =

Power plant in Punjab, India

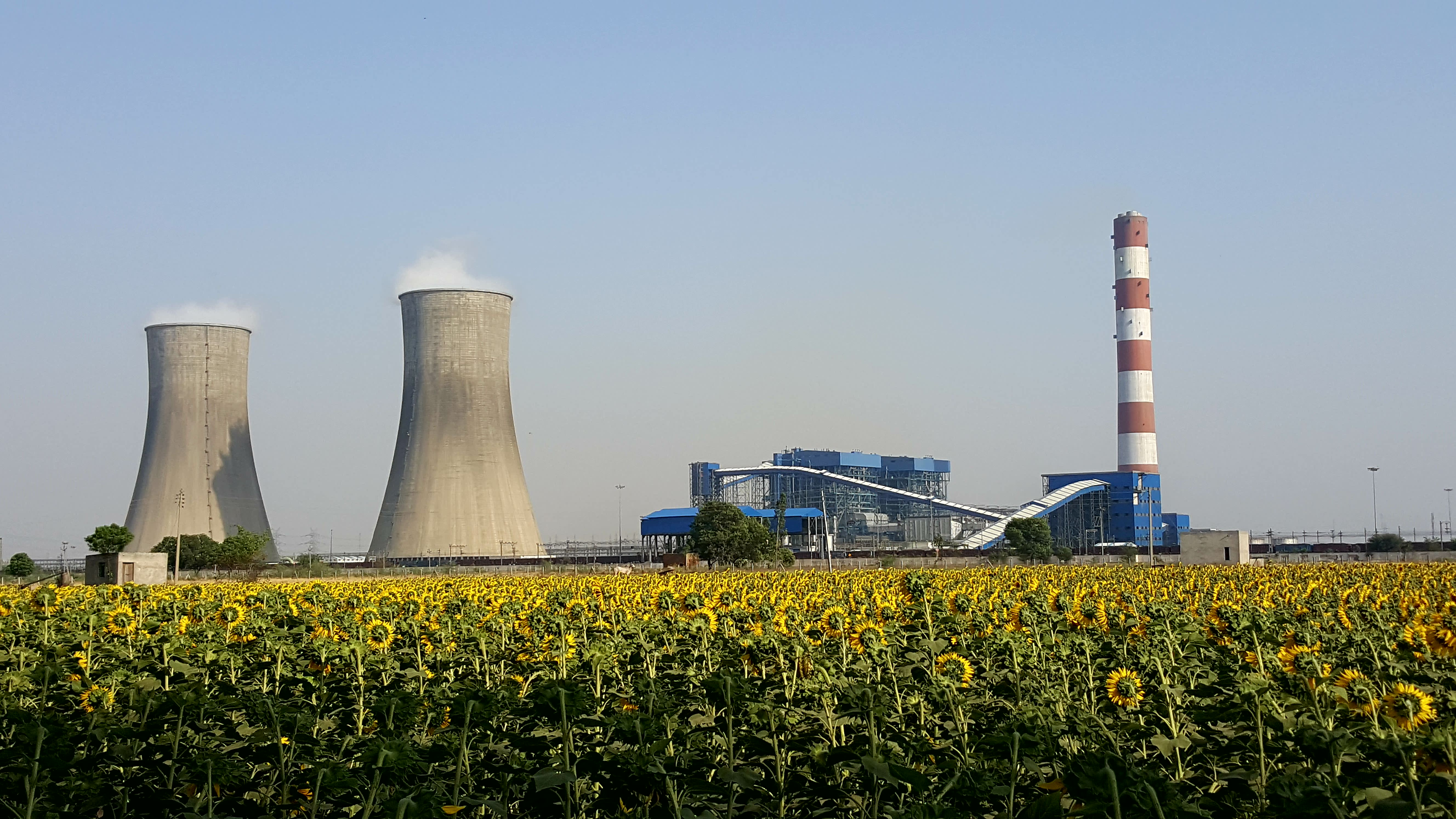
- Location of the Rajpura Thermal Power Plant in Punjab
- Country: India
- Location: Nalash, Rajpura, Patiala, Punjab
- Coordinates: 30°33′18″N 76°34′19″E
- Status: Operational
- Commission date: February 2014

Thermal power station
- Primary fuel: Coal

Power generation
- Units operational: 2 X 700 MW
- Nameplate capacity: 1400 MW

Rajpura Thermal Power Plant is a coal-based thermal power plant located in Nalash village near Rajpura in Patiala district in the Indian state of Punjab. The power plant is operated by the Larsen & Toubro company.

== Capacity ==
Unit No.	Generating Capacity	Commissioned on	Status
1	700 MW	2014 February	Running
2	700 MW	2014 July	Running
