= Bathinda =

City in Punjab, India

- City
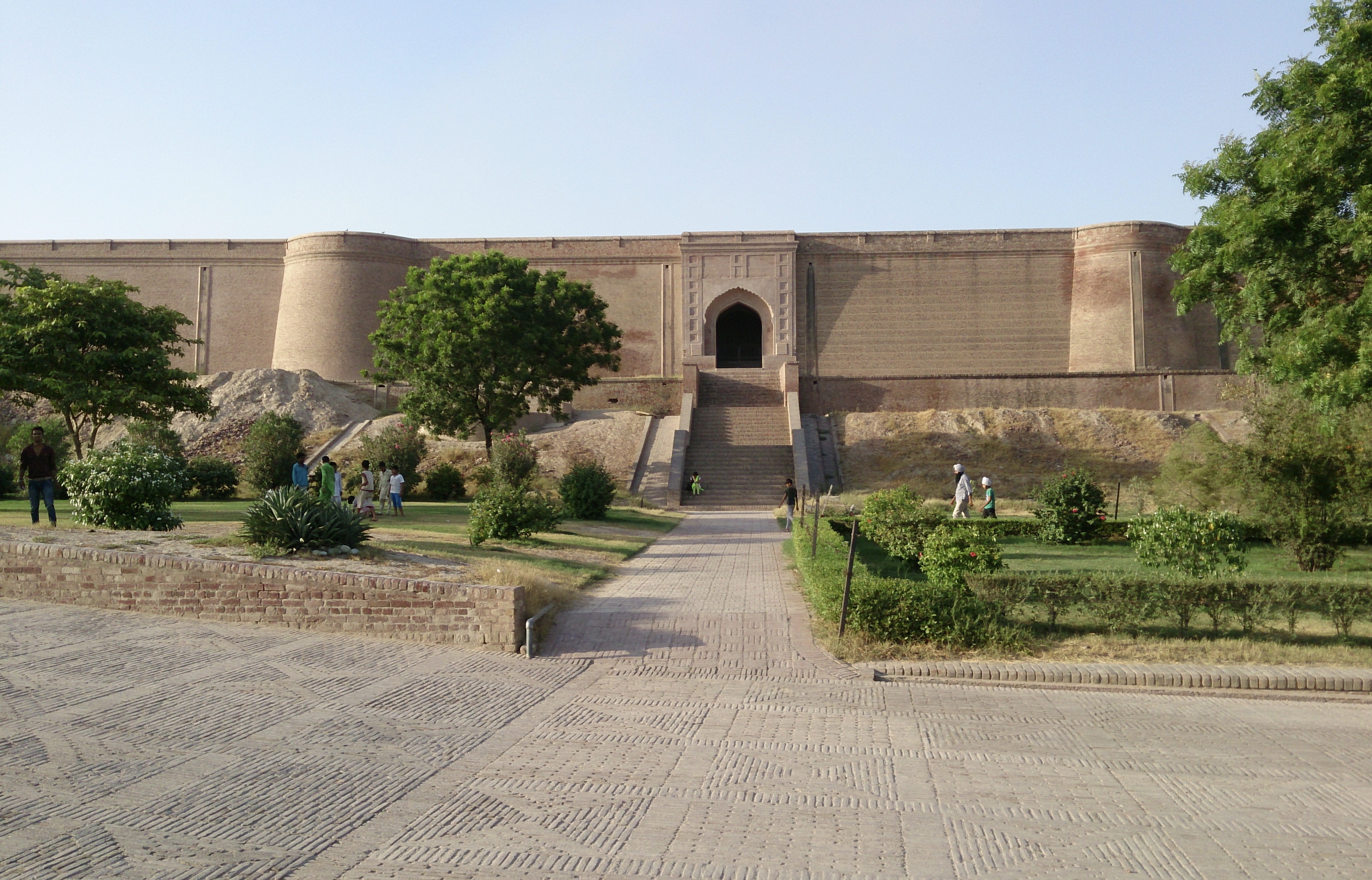
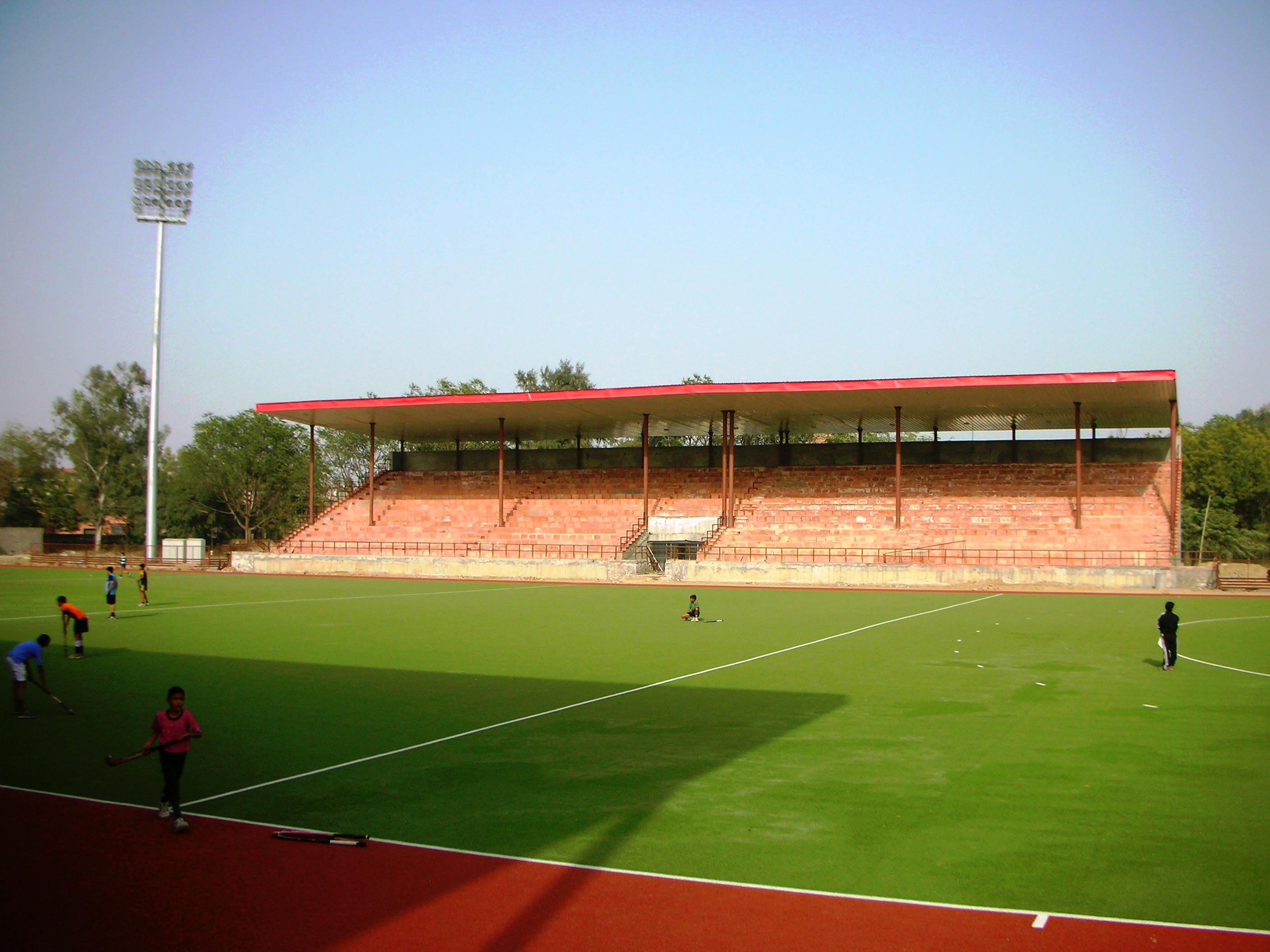
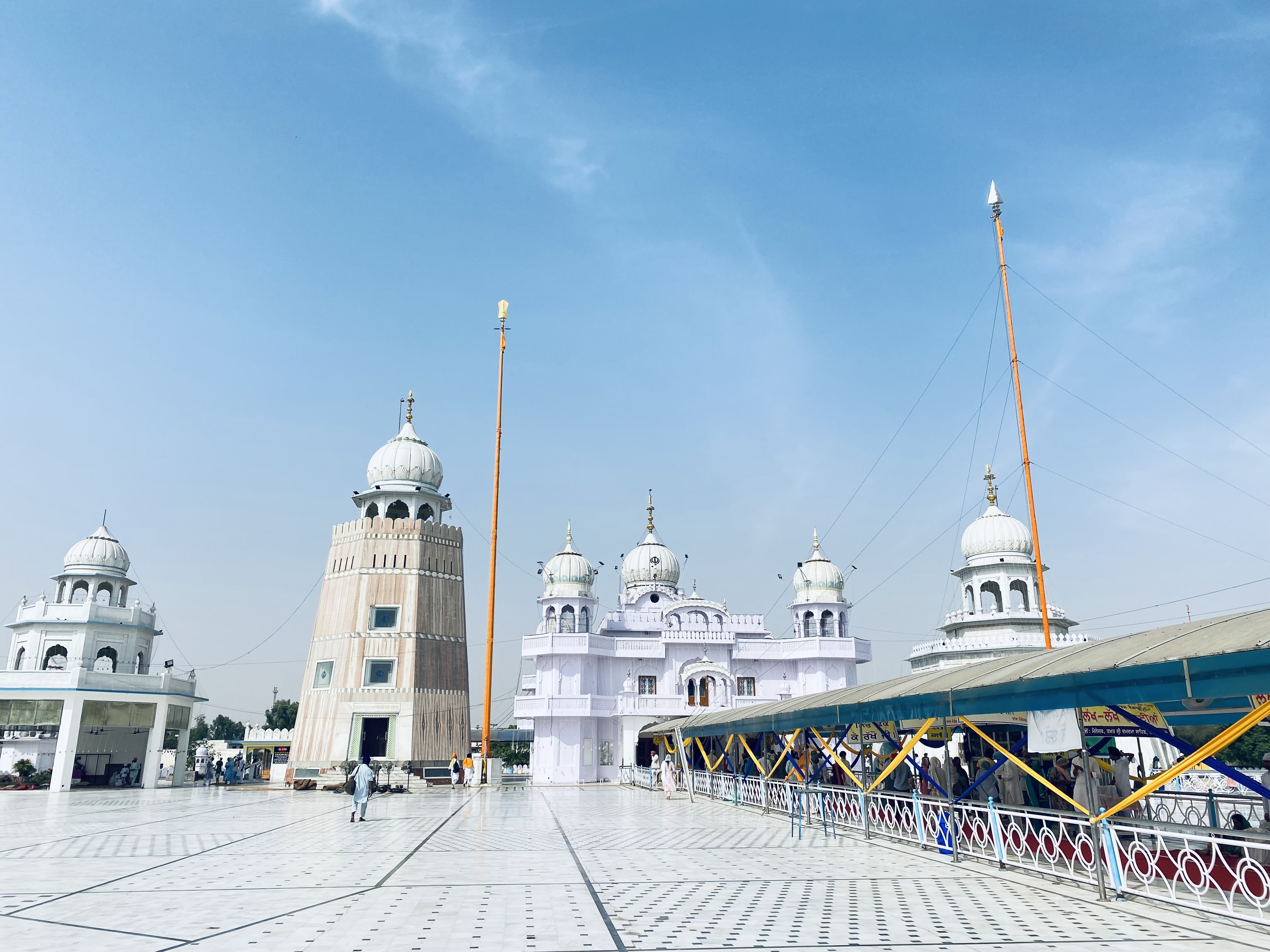
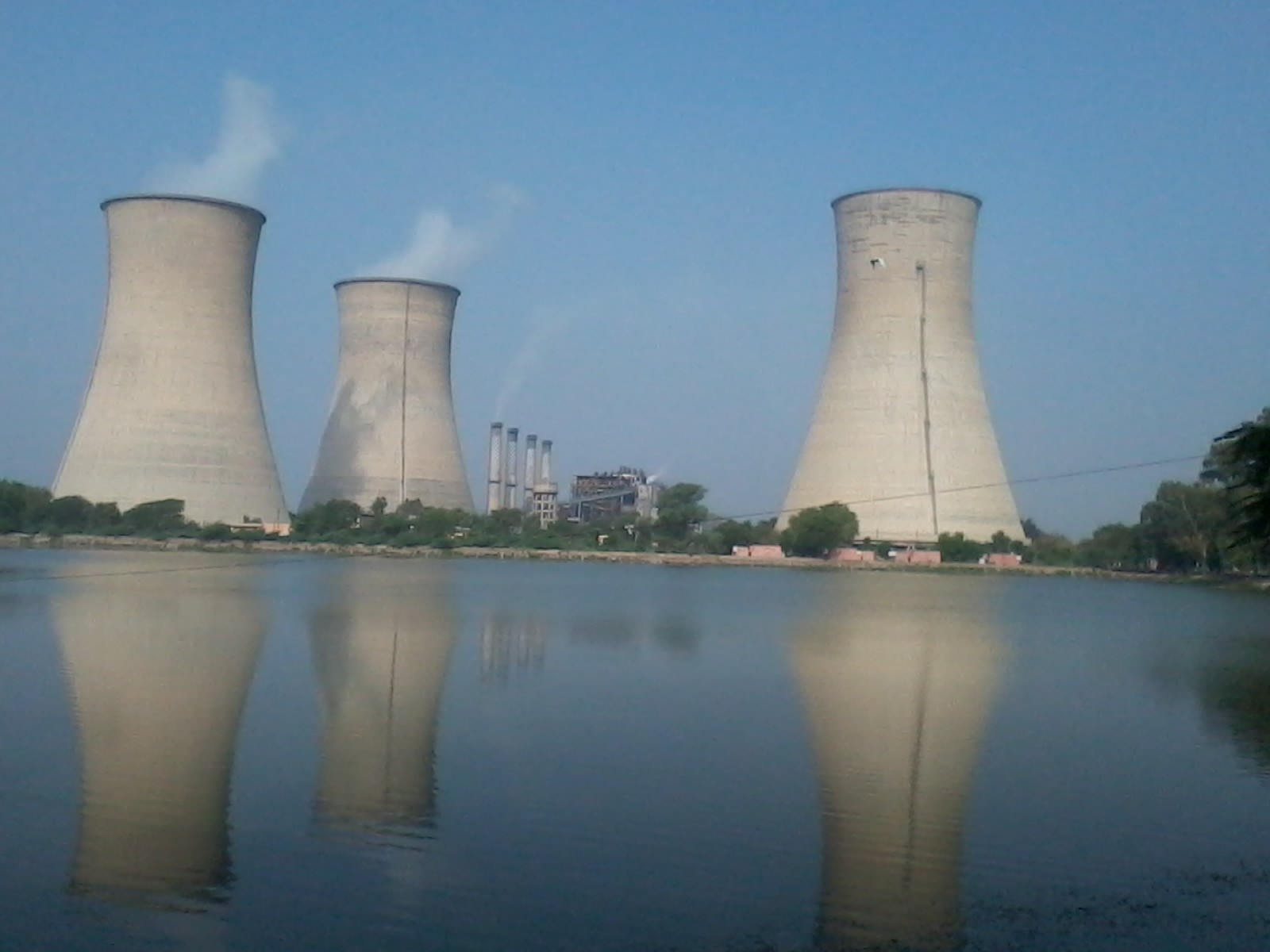
- Top: Qila Mubarak, Hockey Stadium Bathinda, Takht Sri Damdama Sahib, Guru Nanak Dev Thermal Plant across Bathinda Lake

- Location within Punjab Location within India
- Coordinates: 30°13′48″N 74°57′07″E
- Country: India
- State: Punjab
- District: Bathinda

Government
  - Type: Municipality
  - Body: Bathinda Municipal Corporation
  - Commissioner: Sh. Sawan kumar
  - Member of Parliament: Harsimrat Kaur Badal (SAD)
  - Mayor: Sh. Padamjeet Singh Mehta
- Elevation: 210 m (690 ft)

Population (2011)
  - Total: 285,813
  - Rank: Punjab: 5th, India: 161st

Languages
  - Official: Punjabi
- Time zone: UTC+5:30 (IST)
- PIN: 15100X
- Telephone code: +91-164-XXX XXXX
- Vehicle registration: PB-03
- Railways Stations in City: Bathinda railway station
- Website: bathinda.nic.in

Bathinda (Punjabi pronunciation: [bəʈʰɪ˩˥ɳɖä]) is a city and municipal corporation in Punjab, India. The city is the administrative headquarters of Bathinda district. It is located in northwestern India in the Malwa region, 227 km (141 mi) west of the capital city of Chandigarh and is the fifth largest city of Punjab. It is the second cleanest city in Punjab after Mohali.

Bathinda is home to the Maharaja Ranjit Singh Punjab Technical University, Central University of Punjab and AIIMS Bathinda. The city is also home to two modern thermal power plants, Guru Nanak Dev Thermal Plant and Guru Hargobind Thermal Plant at Lehra Mohabbat. Also located in the city is a fertiliser plant, two cement plants (Ambuja Cements and UltraTech Cement Limited), a large army cantonment, an air force station, a zoo, and a historic Qila Mubarak fort.

== History ==
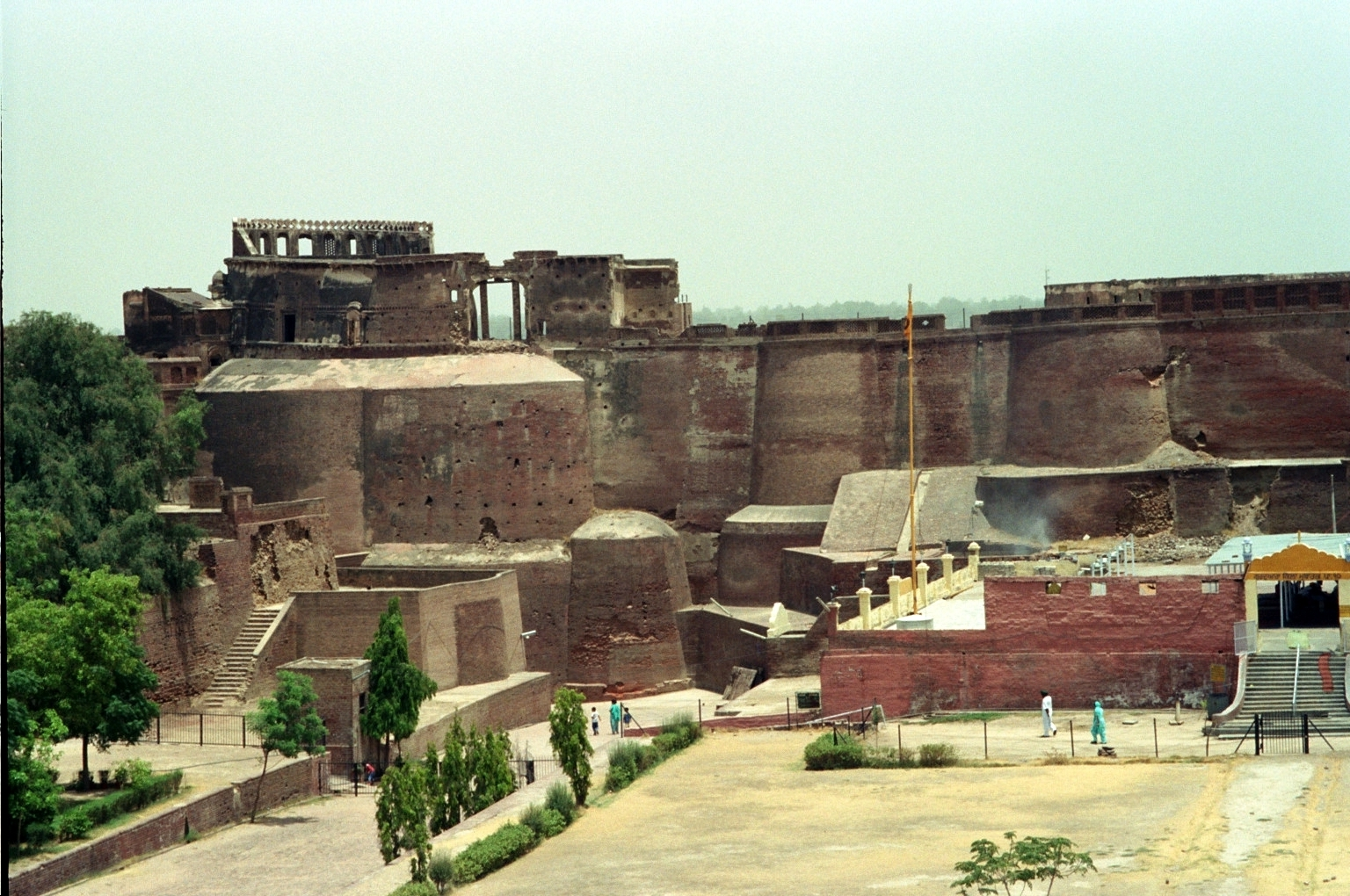
The Qila Mubarak which was built by King Kanishka in 2nd century CE and is the location where the first Empress of India Razia Sultana was held captive

Bhatinda was changed to Bathinda to conform to the phonetical expression as locally pronounced. According to Henry George Raverty, Bathinda was known as Tabar-i-Hind (Labb-ut-Twarikh) or Tabarhindh, which roughly translates as ‘Gateway to India’. The earliest mention of Tabar-i-Hind occurs in the Jami-Ul-Hakayat written about 607 Hijri or 1211 AD. Another early name for the locality was Gobindgarh.

In 1004, Mahmud of Ghazni besieged and captured the local fort, which was located on the route from the northwest into the rich Ganges valley. In 1190, Muhammad of Ghor attacked and occupied the fort of Bathinda. Prithviraj Chauhan, the ruler of this region, managed to recover possession of the fort thirteen months later in 1191 after the First Battle of Tarain. However, Prithviraj Chauhan was killed in the Second Battle of Tarain and the fort of Bathinda once again came under the control of Muhammad Ghori.

In the 3rd century, Rao Bhatti is credited with establishing the modern town of Bathinda in the Lakhi jungle area. In 14th century, present region of bathinda was ruled by Bhati and Bhanot rulers of that time. 1488, Bathinda was conquered by Rao Bika, son of Jodha of Mandore (founder of Jodhpur) and became part of Bikaner princely state. Bathinda was an important fort in the area from Delhi to Lahore during the time of the Delhi Sultanate.

As per Ain-i-Akbari, Bathinda was included in the sarkar of Sirhind in the Subah of Delhi. In 1634, a battle named Battle of Lahira (at Lahira in Bathinda) was fought between Guru Hargobind and Mughals. The town had become an important trade and commercial centre under Mughal rule and the Mughal Emperors such as Akbar and Aurangzeb undertook many projects to enhance the fort of Bathinda.

In circa 1754, the town was conquered by Maharaja Ala Singh, the Maharaja of Patiala and since then it followed the history of erstwhile princely state of Patiala. With the dawn of independence and merger of Patiala and East Punjab States into a division called Patiala and East Punjab States Union (PEPSU), Bathinda became a full-fledged district with headquarters at Bathinda city.

== Demographics ==
=== Population ===
As per provisional reports of Census India, population of Bathinda city in 2011 is 285,813; male and female are 151,782 and 134,031 respectively. The sex ratio of Bathinda city is 868 females per 1000 males. The number of literate people in Bathinda city are 211,318 of which 118,888 are males while 92,430 are females, average literacy rate is 82.84 per cent of which male and female literacy is 87.86 and 77.16 per cent respectively. Total children (ages 0 to 6) in Bathinda city are 30,713: 16,472 boys and 14,241 girls. Child sex ratio of girls is 865 per 1000 boys.

=== Religion ===
Hinduism is the majority religion in Bathinda city with 62.61% people following the faith. Sikhism is the second most popular religion in the city which is followed by 35.04% of the people. Minorities are Muslims, Christians, Buddhists and Jains. Sikhs count for 70.89% of the population in Bathinda District on a whole in spite of not being a majority in the city.

Religion in Bathinda
Religion	Percent
Hinduism	62.61%
Sikhism	35.04%
Islam	1.12%
Christianity	0.33%
Others	0.90%

== Geography and climate ==
Bathinda is in the northwestern region of India and is a part of the Indo-Gangetic alluvial plains. The exact cartographic co-ordinates of Bathinda are 30.20°N 74.95°E. It has an average elevation of 201 metres (660 ft).

Bathinda

Climate chart (precipitation, max. and min. temperature)
J	F	M	A	M	J	J	A	S	O	N	D
10 20 7	19 24 10	7.9 30 15	9.8 37 21	20 41 26	38 41 28	90 37 28	84 36 27	52 36 25	9.4 34 19	1.4 29 13	3.6 23 8
- █ Average max. and min. temperatures in °C
- █ Precipitation totals in mm
- Source: MSN World Weather
Imperial conversion
J	F	M	A	M	J	J	A	S	O	N	D
0.4 68 45	0.8 75 50	0.3 86 59	0.4 99 70	0.8 106 79	1.5 106 82	3.6 99 82	3.3 97 81	2 97 77	0.4 93 66	0.1 84 55	0.1 73 46
- █ Average max. and min. temperatures in °F
- █ Precipitation totals in inches

Bathinda's climate corresponds to semi-arid with high variation between summer and winter temperatures. Average annual rainfall is relatively low, in a range of 20 cm to 40 cm.

In recent times, Summer temperatures of 49 °C (120 °F) and winter temperatures of 1 °C (about 33 °F) were not unknown in Bathinda, lowest being −1.4 °C (29.5 °F) in the winter of 2013

=== Suburbs ===
- Bhucho Mandi ~16 km
- Goniana ~13 km
- Maur Mandi ~36 km
- Rampura Phul ~32 km
- Talwandi Sabo ~29 km
- Raman ~42 km
- Sangat, India ~21 km

=== Environmental issues ===
There has been increasing incidence of various types of cancer in and around Bathinda. It is attributed to the presence of polluting industries and the indiscriminate use of modern pesticides and other toxic materials in farming.

A 2007 epidemiological study found that the surface waters of Bathinda are contaminated with arsenic, cadmium, chromium, selenium and mercury primarily due to the discharge of untreated waste water from surrounding industries. Unscientific farming practices, that emerged after the introduction of Green Revolution, are also alleged to be a reason for growing incidence of not just cancer but also, high rates of spontaneous abortions, reproductive ailments, genetic deformities, anaemia, diarrhoea, vomiting, fluorosis and a host of skin ailments including rashes and boils. Many young couples are also reported to be migrating out to save their children from adverse effects. Hence the government has completely banned the use of ground water in the city for drinking purposes.

In the cleanliness survey, conducted by the Union Ministry of Urban Development, Bathinda scored an all-India rank of 79 and number 1 rank in Punjab.

== Government and politics ==
Bathinda city is governed by Municipal Corporation Bathinda. It has been subdivided into 8 zones and 50 wards for the purpose of the administration. The departments under the Bathinda Municipal Corporation are: Engineering, Building, Street Light, Horticulture, License, Advertisement, Land, House Tax, Sanitation, Punjab Water Supply and Sewerage Board, Water Supply and Sewerage Department, Birth and Death Department and Right To Information Authorities.

The administrative wing is headed by Municipal Commissioner Lovejeet Kaur Kalsi while the elected wing is headed by Mayor Padamjeet Singh Mehta.

Bathinda has a rich historical past. Since 1945, the city has been administered by the Municipal Committee. With the city's expansion, the district headquarters relocated from Faridkot to Bathinda in 1953. In 2003, the state of Punjab awarded it the city Municipal Corporation status.

National programmes such as PM SVANidhi Scheme, AMRUT 2.0, Smart City, PMAY-U have been implemented in Bathinda.

== Transportation ==
Bhatinda Railway Station has connectivity to most of the major cities in India. Four national highways: NH 7 (Fazilka - Badrinath National Highway), NH 54 (Kenchiyan, Hanumangarh - Pathankot National Highway), NH 148B (Bathinda to Kotputli) and NH 754 (Bathinda to Jalalabad, Fazilka) and expressways like The Amritsar–Jamnagar Expressway (Economic Corridor 3 or EC-3) pass through/near the city.

The Virk Kalan Air Force Base also doubles up as Bathinda Airport with flights to Delhi and Jammu on alternate days.

== Education ==
=== College education ===
Colleges within Bathinda include:

- Adesh Institute of Medical Sciences and Research
- Akal University, Talwandi Sabo
- Central university of Punjab
- Guru Kashi University

== Notable people ==
- Manny Aulakh, Canadian international cricketer
- Sunny and Inder Bawra, composer duo
- Parduman Singh Brar, shotputter, Asiad gold medallist
- Balwant Gargi, writer and dramatist
- Baba Ratan Hindi, who claimed to be the first Indian Muslim
- Amrit Maan, actor, singer and lyricist
- Kuldeep Manak, singer
- Harbhajan Mann, actor and singer
- Mayank Markande, cricketer
- Mehar Mittal, actor and producer
- Mehreen Pirzada, actress
- Riaz ur Rehman Saghar, Pakistani poet and lyricist
- Janmeja Singh Sekhon, politician
- Avneet Sidhu, Commonwealth games gold-winning shooter
- Balkar Sidhu, singer
- Kul Sidhu, theatre artist and actress
- Gurdial Singh, novelist
- Gurpreet Singh, artist

== Gallery ==
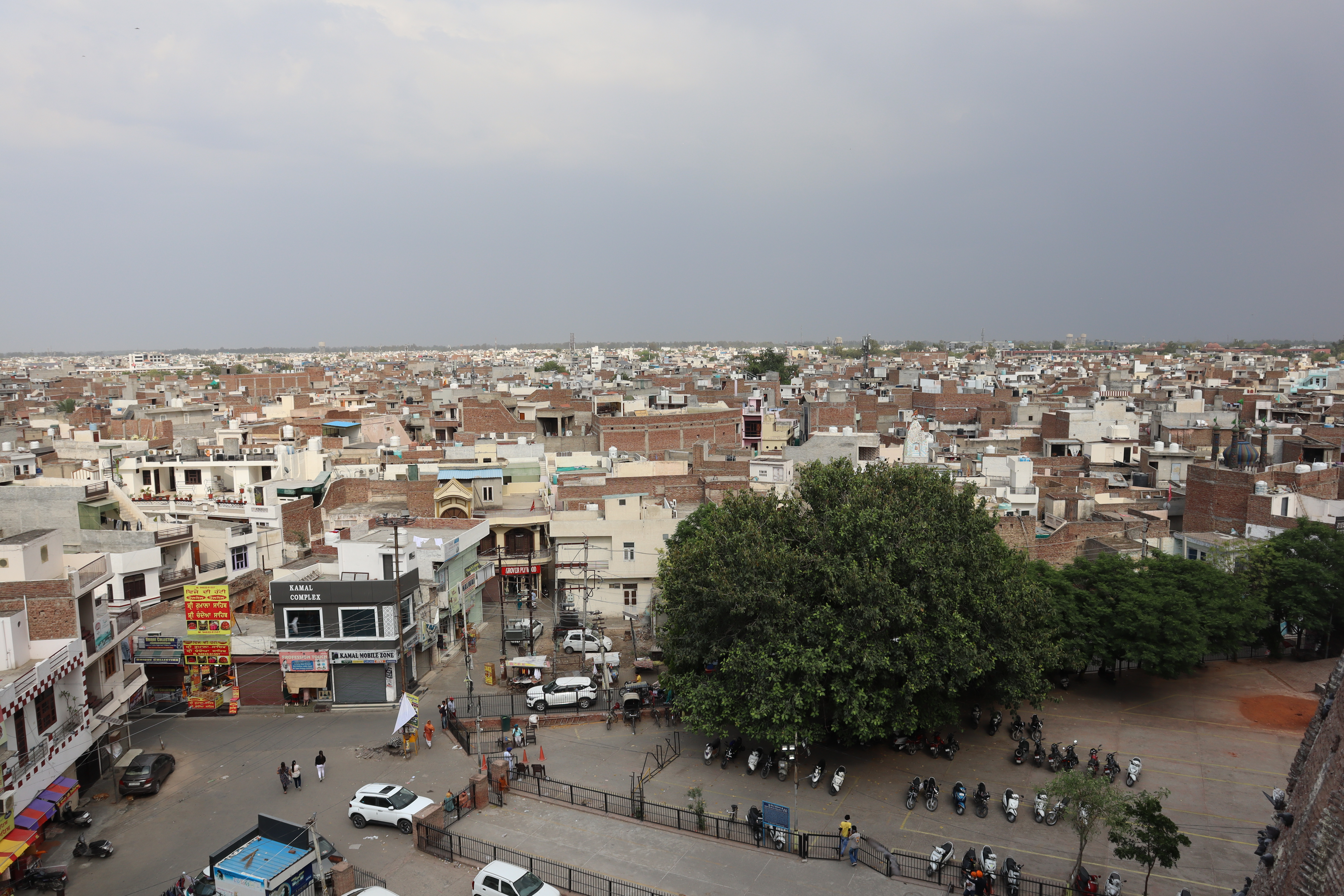
The city skyline of Bathinda from Bathinda Fort.

Govt. Senior Secondary School Jeeda, Bathinda District.

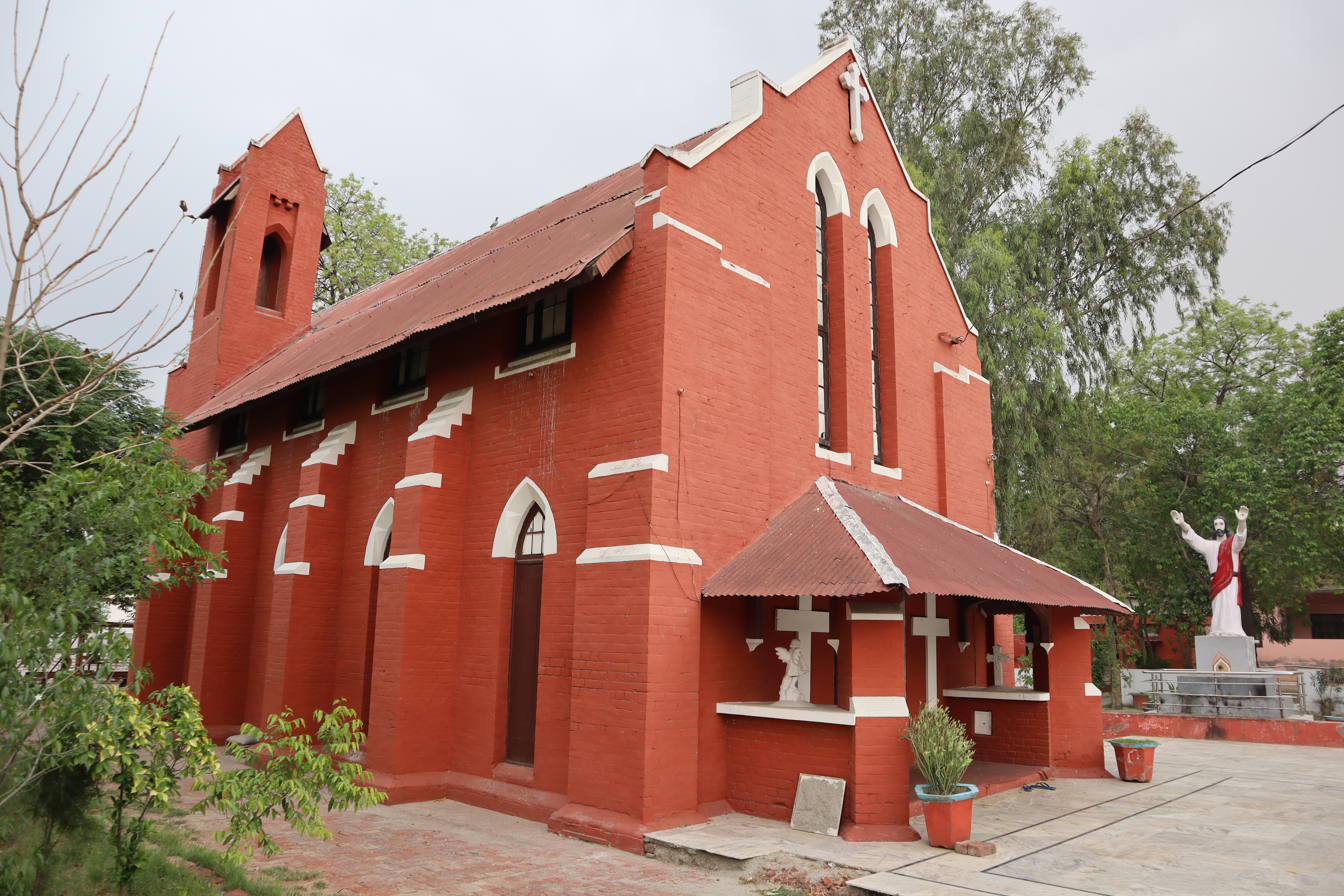
Methodist Church, Bathinda.

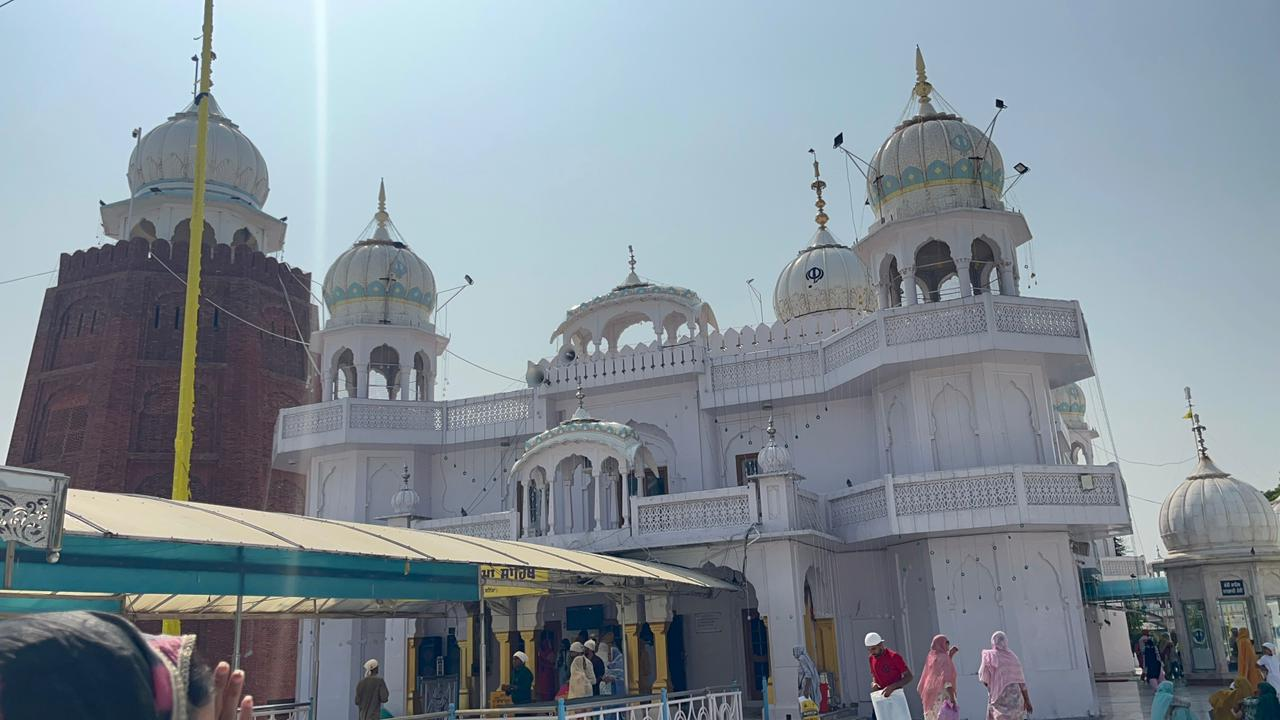
Takht Sri Damdama Sahib, Bathinda

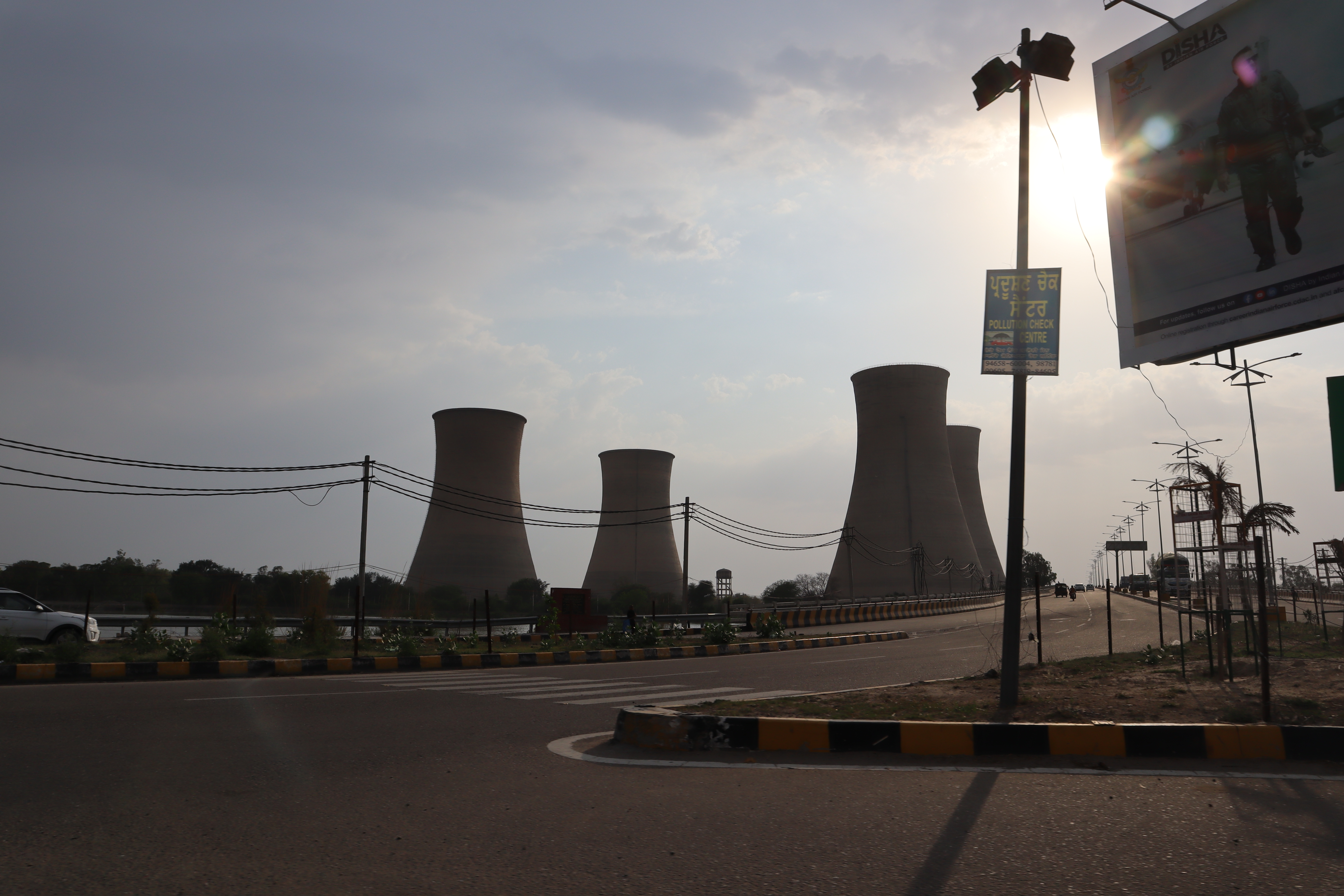
Guru Nanak Dev Thermal Plant (GNDTP), Bhatinda

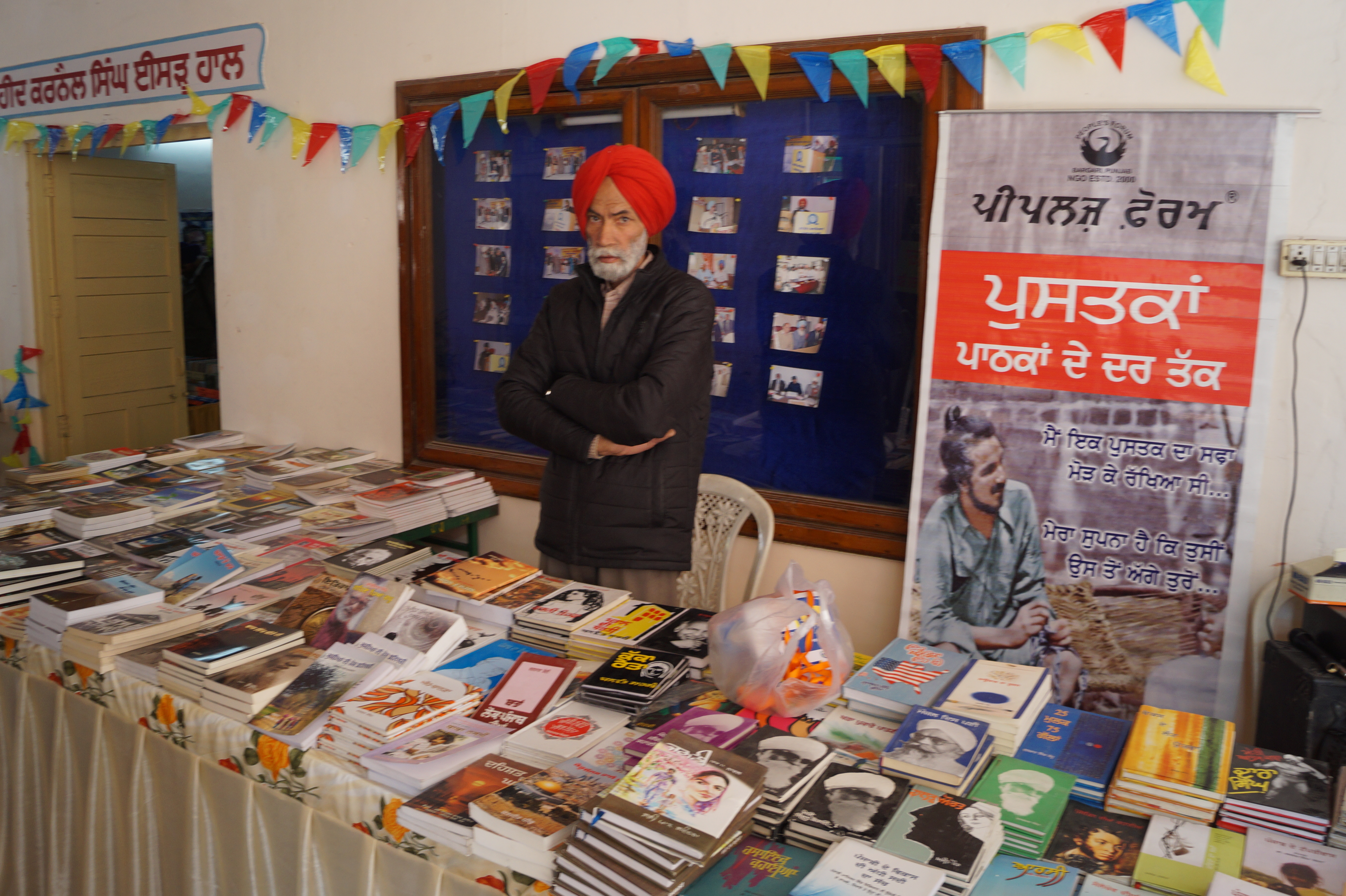
People's Literary Festival, Bathinda.

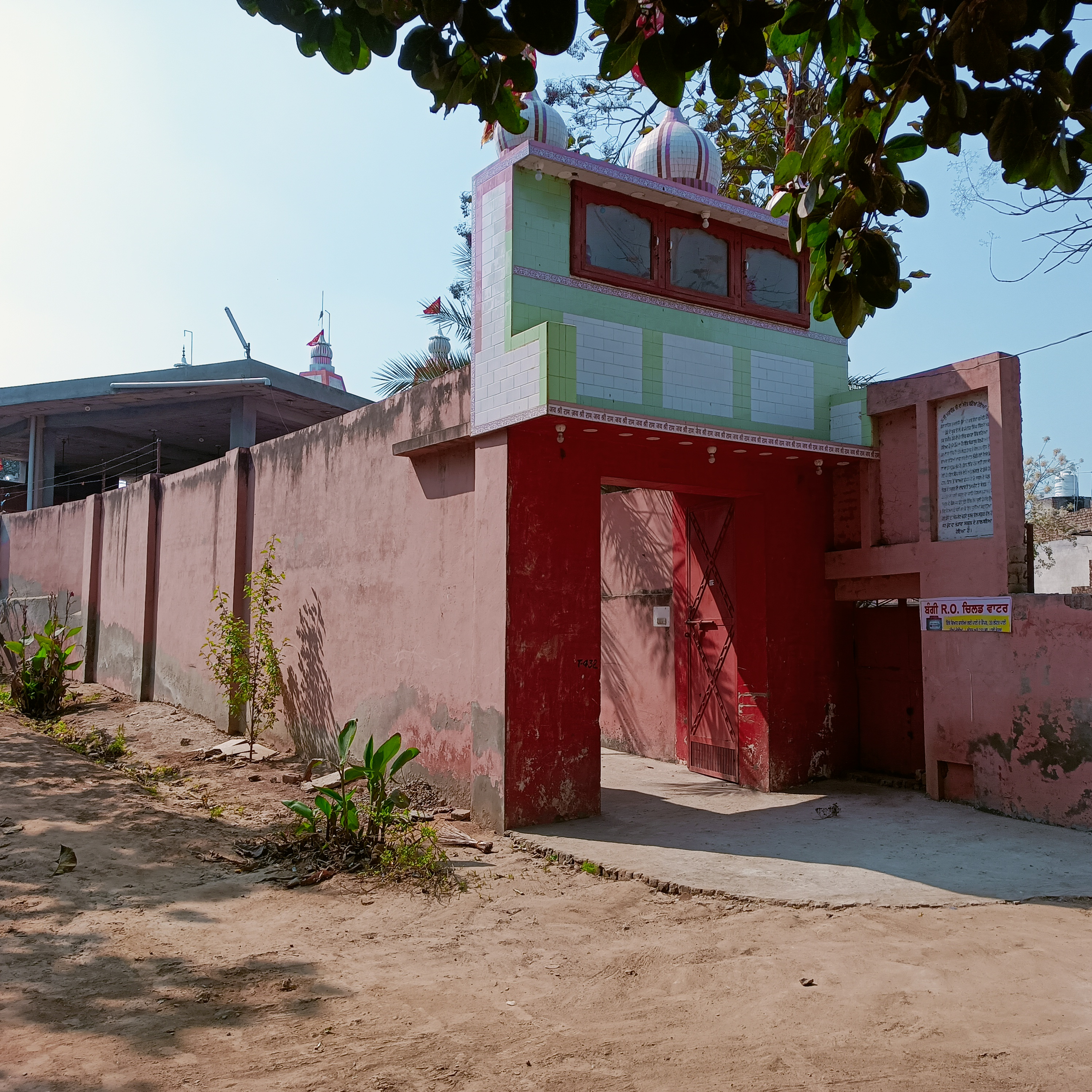
Mahavir Mandir Sukhladhi, Bathinda District.

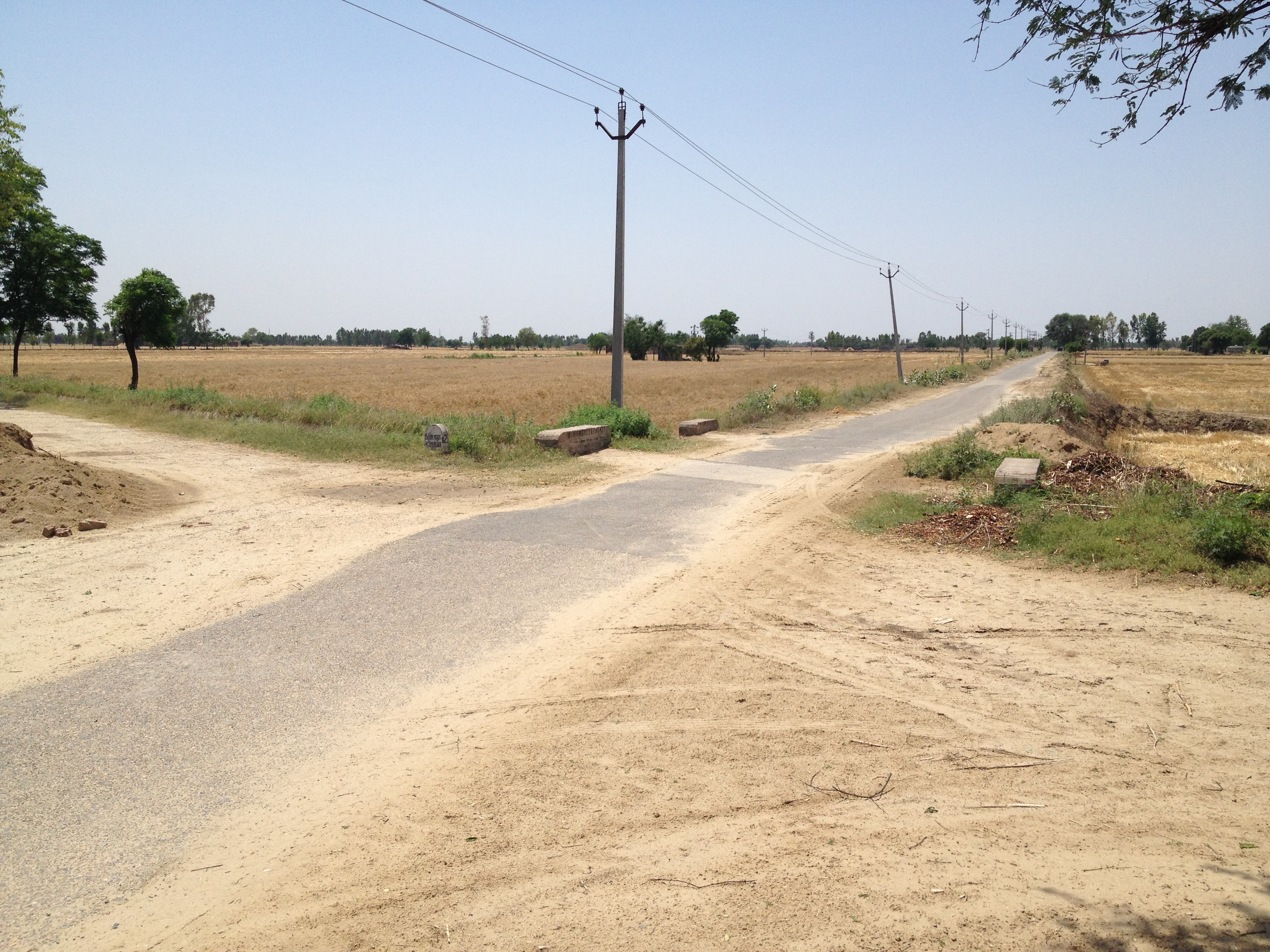
Kothe Gobind Nagar Road, Bathinda District.
