= Sports in Punjab, India =

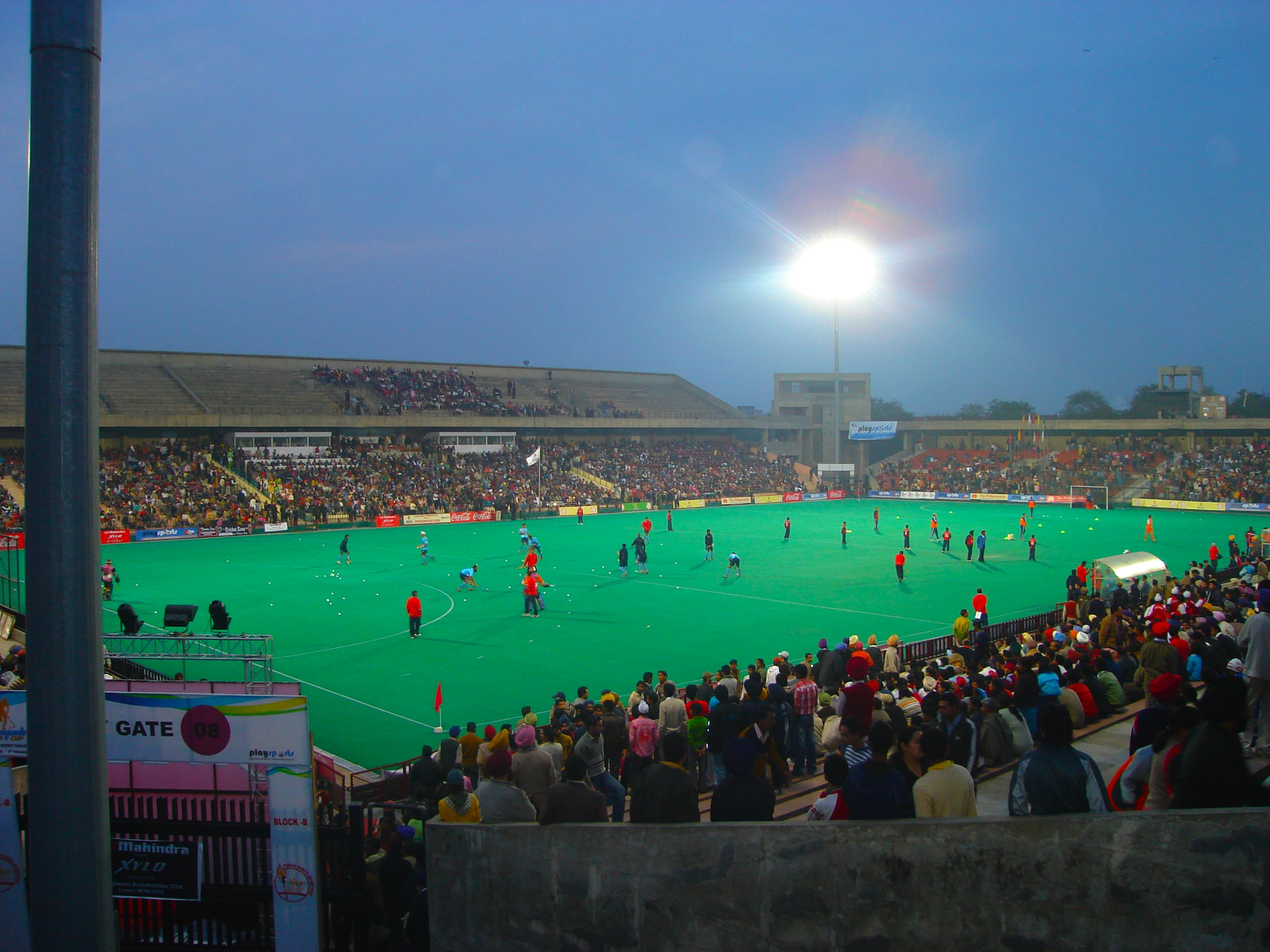
Chandigarh hockey stadium

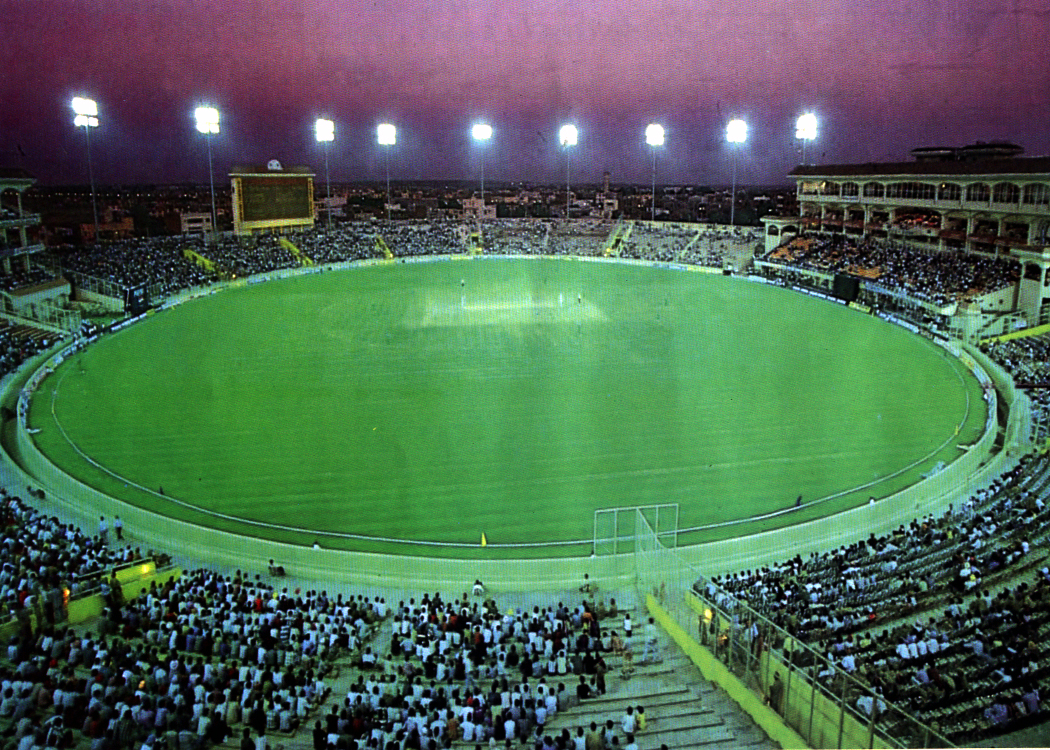
LightsMohali: Cricket

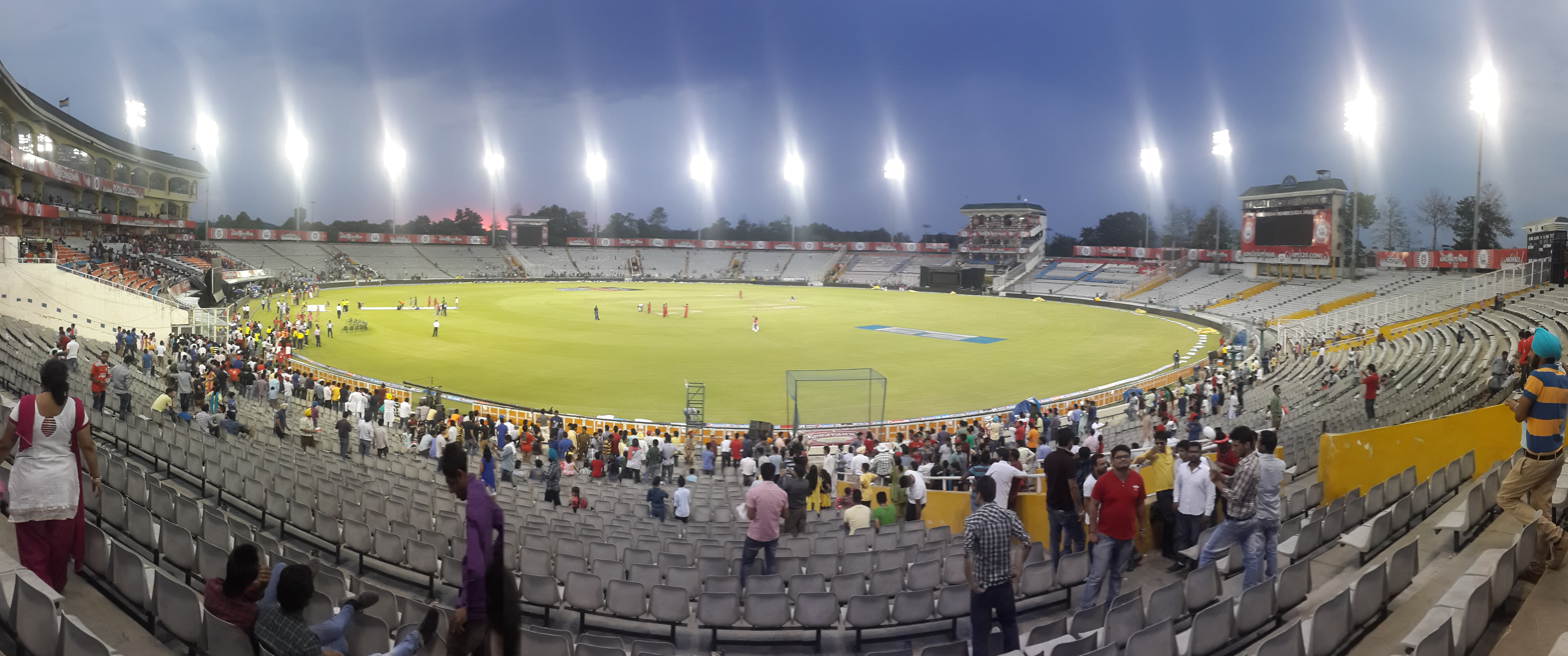
PCA Stadium, Mohali 1

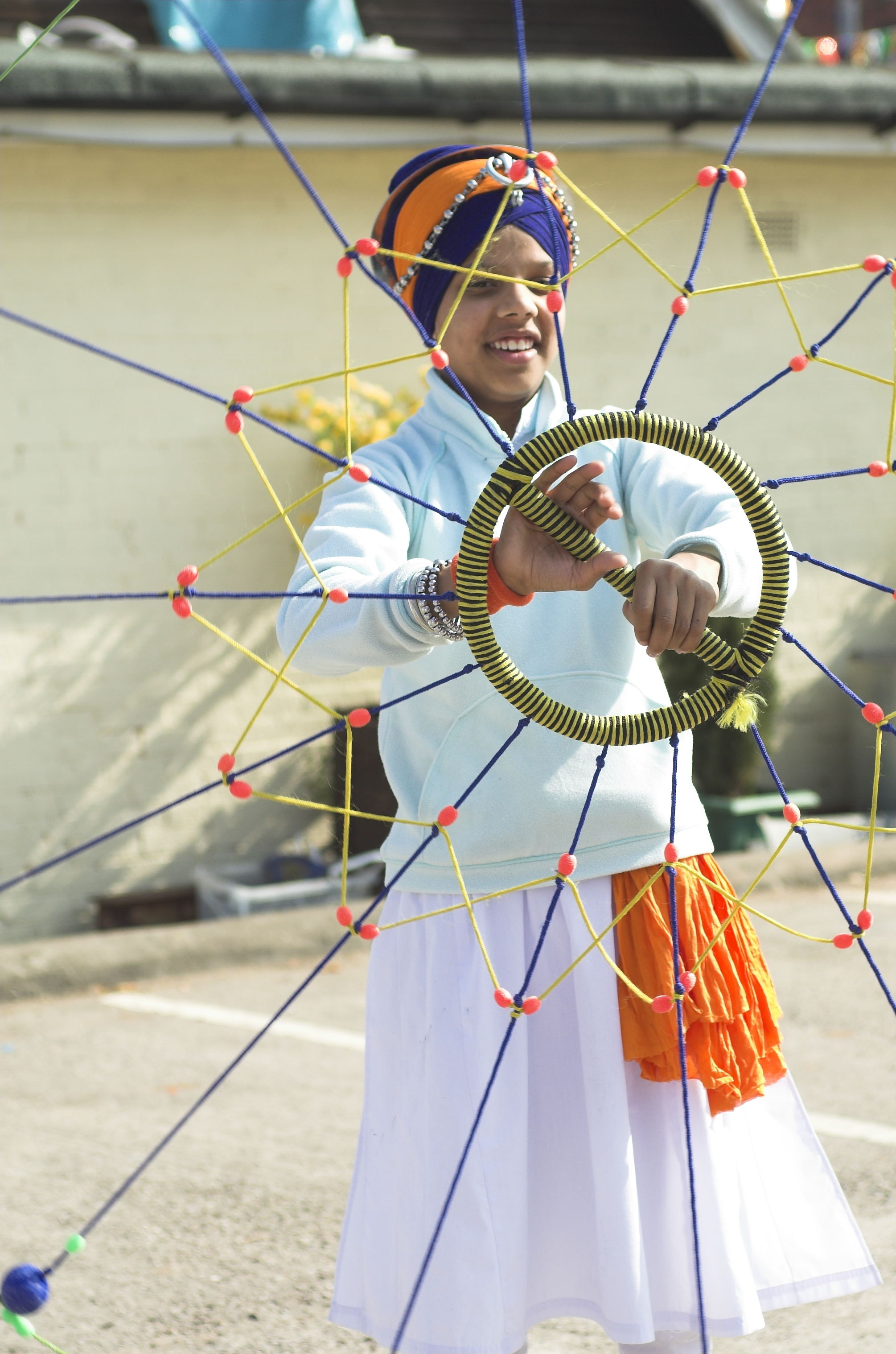
A young practitioner with chakari

Punjabis play a wide variety of sports and games, ranging from modern games such as hockey and cricket, to the more traditional games such as Kabaddi, Kushtian (wrestling) and Khuddo khoondi (similar to hockey). There are over 100 traditional games and sports of Punjab.

To promote traditional games of Punjab, the state government has since 2014 been working on initiatives to promote the Punjab Rural Games. The games will include sports such as Kushtian in the state.

The sports played in Punjab include the following:

== Cricket ==
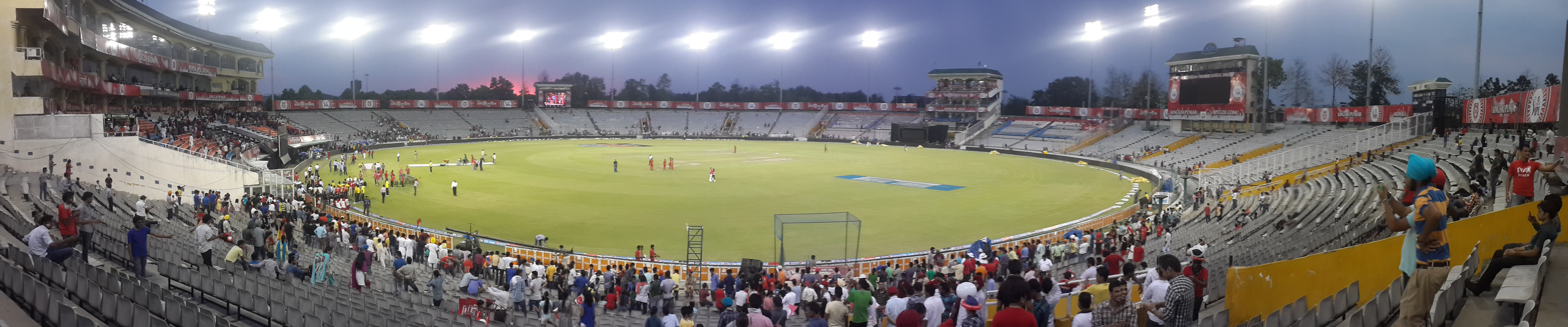
PCA Stadium Mohali wide

Cricket is a favourite sport of Punjabis. The sport is governed at State level by the Punjab Cricket Association. The Kings XI Punjab are a franchise cricket team based in Mohali, Punjab, that plays in the Indian Premier League.

== Gatka ==
Gatka (Punjabi: ਗਤਕਾ) is a traditional South Asian form of combat-training in which wooden sticks are used to simulate swords in sparring matches.

== Kabaddi ==
Pictogram of Kabaddi

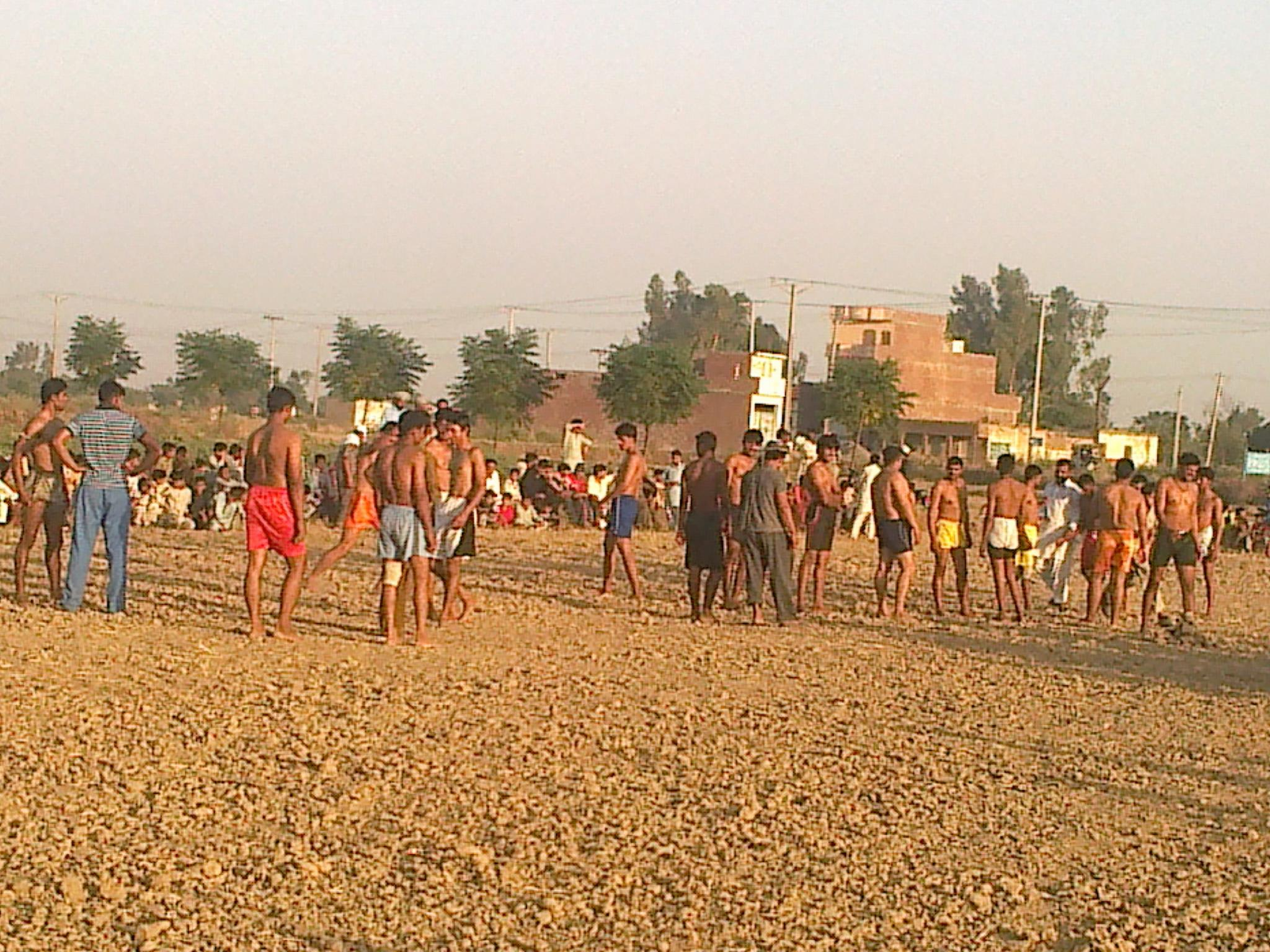
Kabaddi in wadala sandhuan

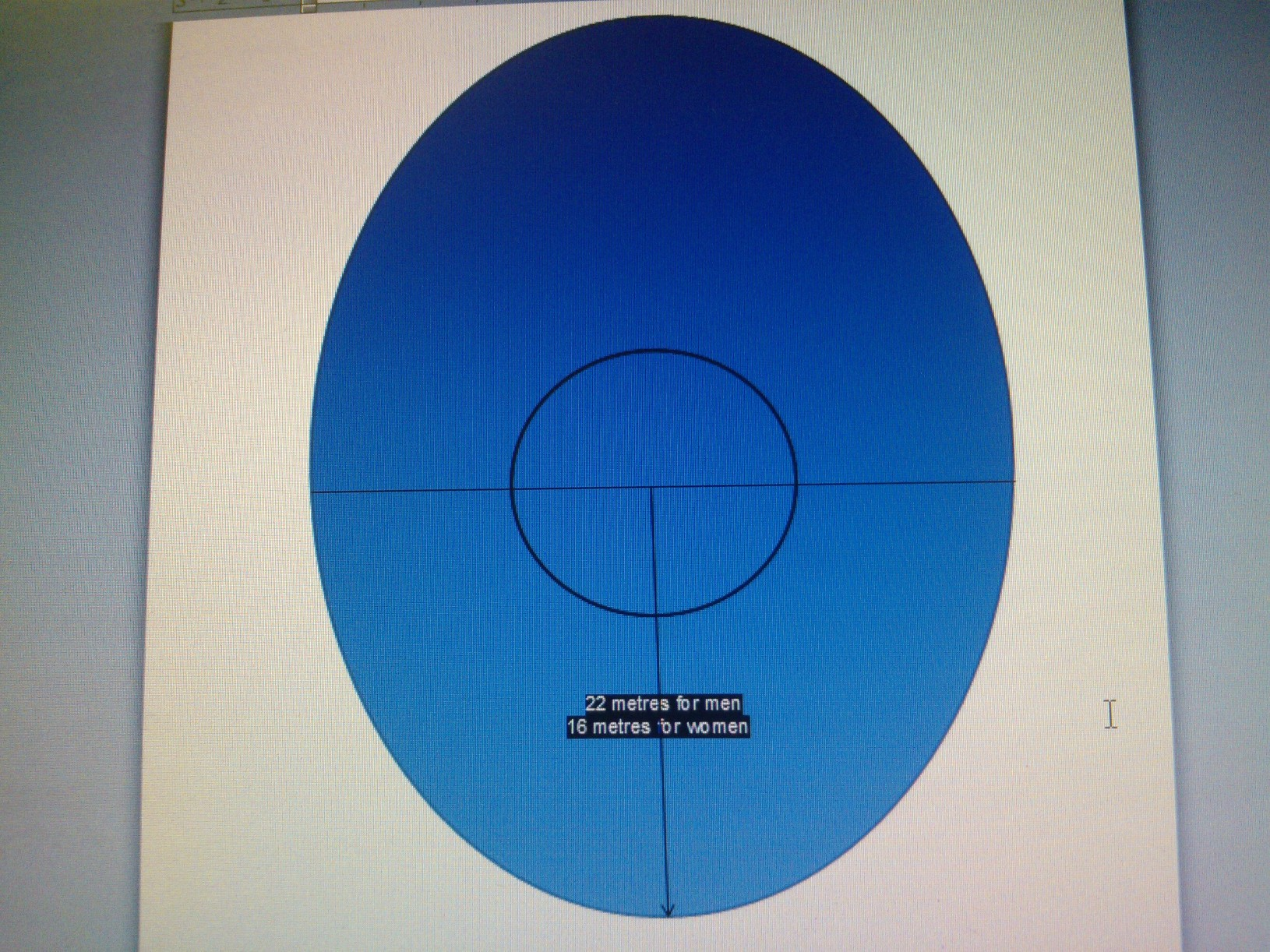
Circle Style Kabaddi ground

=== Punjab Circle style ===
This is the state game of Punjab.

=== Kabaddi World Cup ===
Punjab has been coordinating the Kabaddi World cup since 2010 which is based on the Punjab Circle style. The Men's final in the World cup of 2014 was played between India and Pakistan and was won by India 45–42. The Women's final was between India and New Zealand with India winning 36–27 for the second time in a row.

The closing ceremony was held at the Guru Gobind Singh Stadium, Badal Sri Muktsar Sahib. Star acts included Arif Lohar, Miss Poojaa, Gippy Grewal, and Satinder Satti. American motorcyclists also performed.

=== World Kabaddi League ===
World Kabaddi League was introduced in 2014. The league followed the rules & guidelines as defined by the Punjab circle style Kabaddi. The league was played across four countries from August 2014 to December 2014.

=== Traditional Punjabi Kabaddi styles ===
==== Lambi Kauddi ====
In Lambi Kauddi (Punjabi: ਲੰਬੀ ਕੌਡੀ) there are 15 players with a circular pitch of 15–20 feet. There is no outer limit. The players can run as far they can. There is no referee. The raider will say "kauddi, kauddi" throughout the attack.

==== Saunchi Kauddi ====
Saunchi Kauddi (Punjabi: ਸੌਚੀ ਕੌਡੀ) (also called Saunchi pakki/Punjabi: ਸੌਚੀ ਪੱਕੀ) can best be described as being similar to boxing. It is popular in the Malwa area of Punjab. It is unlimited players with a circular playing pitch. A bamboo with a red cloth is dug into the ground which is paraded by the winner.

In sauchi kabaddi, the raider will hit the defender but only on the chest. The defender will then hold the raiders wrist. A foul is declared if any other part of the body is grabbed. If the defender hold the raiders wrist and restricts his movement, he will be declared the winner. If the raider loses the grip of the defender, then the raider will be the winner.

==== Goongi Kabaddi ====
A popular style is "Goongi Kabaddi" (Punjabi: ਗੂੰਗੀ ਕਬੱਡੀ) (silent Kabaddi) where a raider player does not speak and say the word kabaddi but just touches the opponent's team player and the whom he touches only that player will try to stop the player. The struggle will continue till he reaches the starting line or acknowledge the defeat and loses a point, or if he safely reaches the starting line, he will get the point.

== Hockey ==
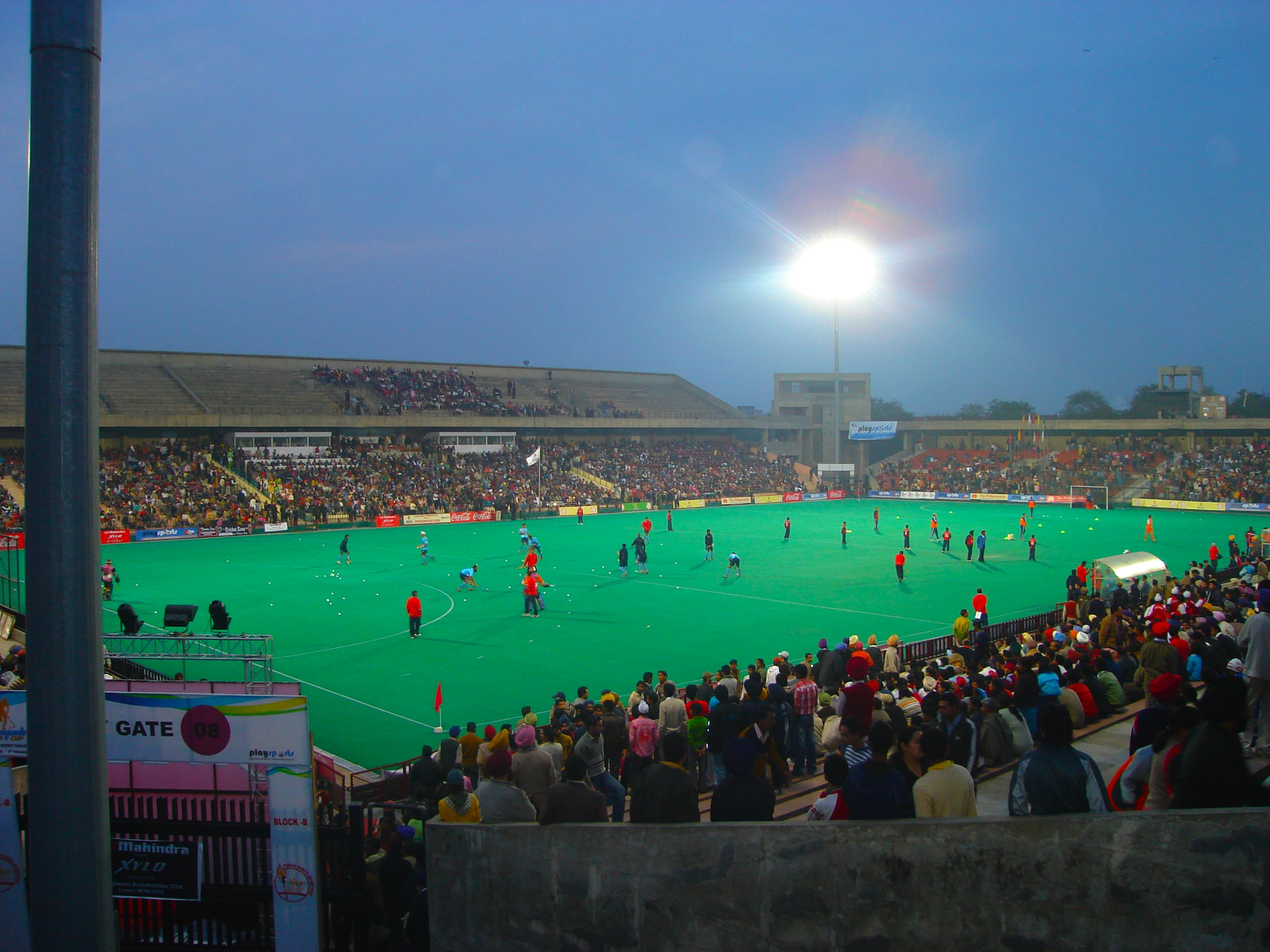
Chandigarh hockey stadium

Hockey is a popular sport in Punjab. The state has its own team: Punjab Warriors.

The other team is the Sher-e-Punjab professional field hockey team based in Jalandhar, Punjab that plays in World Series Hockey.

== Football ==
Punjab Football Association (PFA) is the state governing body of football in Punjab, India. It is affiliated with the All India Football Federation, the sports national governing body. Then JCT FC and Punjab FC played in the I-League. The club now competes in the Indian Super League, the top flight of the Indian football league system, following promotion from the 2022–23 I-League.

== Basketball ==
Punjab has traditionally been home to several of India's top basketball players who have represented the country's national basketball team.

In 2016, the Punjab Steelers were runners-up of the UBA Pro Basketball League, India's national championship for professional basketball teams.

== Traditional sports and games ==
There are a wide variety of traditional games played by children and adults. With the spread of games such as hockey and cricket, some of the traditional Punjabi games are not played as much as they once were. However, the current repertoire of traditional Punjabi games is wide and this article gives an outline of some of the games.

In order to play a game, it is necessary to select the captain who is known as a dayee (ਦਾਈ), meetee (ਮੀਟੀ), or pit. There are various ways of selecting players. One method used by children to select the captain is by all the players standing in a circle, with one player going around the circle singing:

Engan mengan
Tali talengan
Kalaa peelaa dakra
Gurh kahava bail vadhava
Moollee patra
Patra valey ghorhay aya
Hath kutarhee per kutarhee
Nikal balya teri vari

Punjabi:

ਏਂਗਣ ਮੇਂਗਣ
ਤਲੀ ਤਲੇਂਗਣ
ਕਾਲਾ ਪੀਲਾ ਡੱਕਰਾ
ਗੂੜ ਖਾਵਾਂਂ ਵੇਲ ਵਧਾਵਾਂ
ਮੂਲੀ ਪੱਤਰਾ
ਪੱਤਰਾਂ ਵਾਲੇ ਘੋੜੇ ਆਏ
ਹੱਥ ਕੁਤਾੜੀ ਪੈਰ ਕੁਤਾੜੀ
ਨਿਕਲ ਬਾਲਿਆ ਤੇਰੀ ਵਾਰੀ

The player saying the above will stop at the player when the song finishes who then is selected. The last player becomes the captain.

== Male sports and games ==
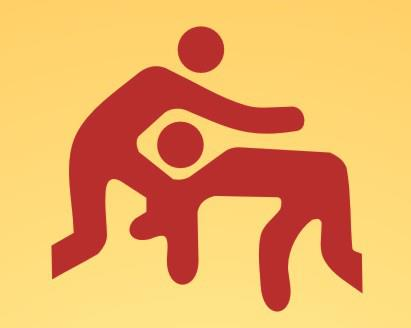
Bhartiya Kushti Logo

=== Kushtian (Punjabi: ਕੁਸ਼ਤੀਆ) ===
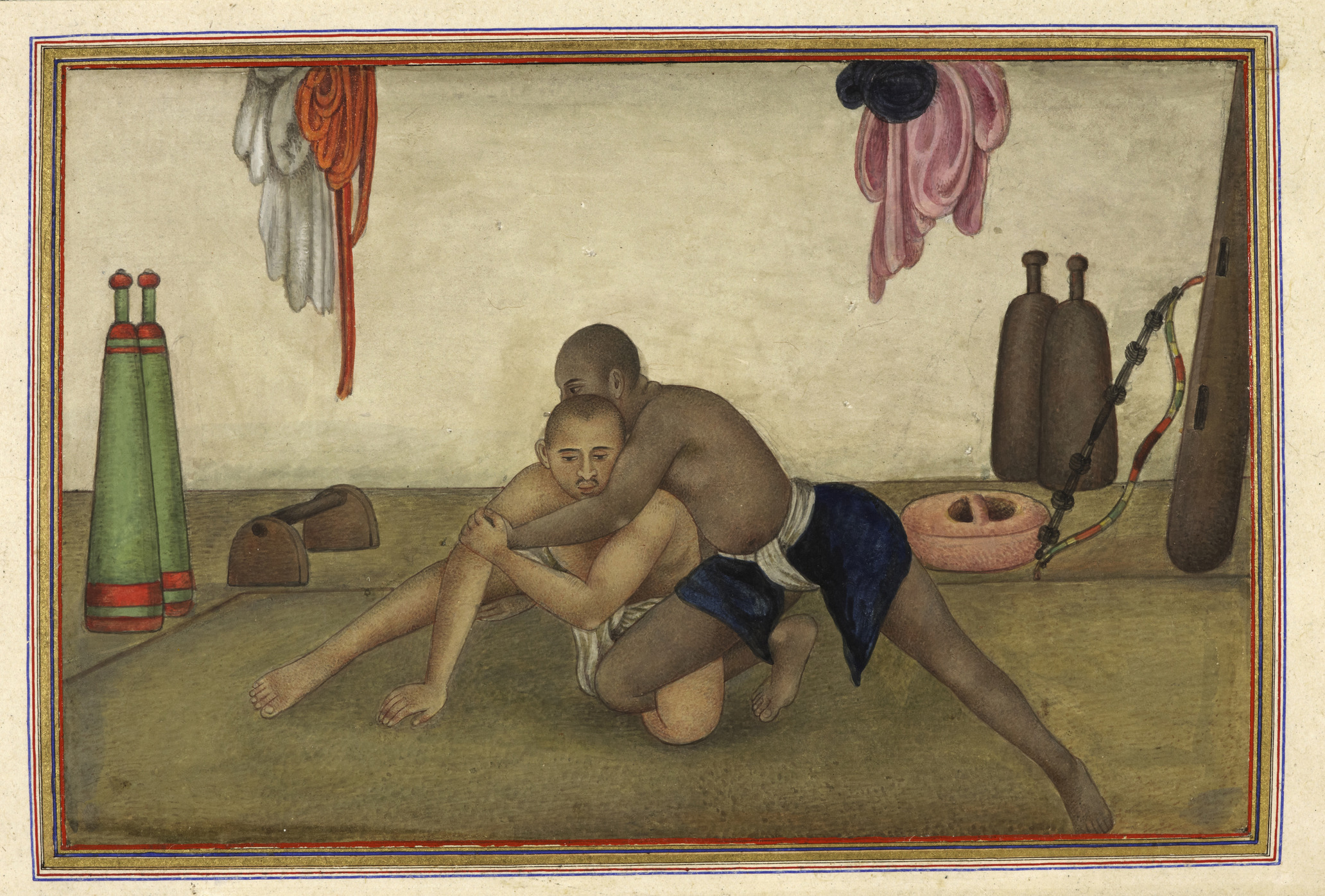
Illustration of two wrestlers (1825)

The wrestling will take place in a circular court with soft ground which in Punjabi is called an "akharha". Two wrestlers will continue to wrestle until the back of one touches the ground. The winner will parade the court with the loser following him. The wrestlers are called Pehlwans who train with modern weights and traditional weights such as a Gada (mace).

The aim of kushti is to wrestle the opponent and to block the other player. The traditional methods of wrestling in the Punjab include the following:

- kalajang marna (Punjabi: ਕਲਾਜੰਗ ਮਾਰਨਾ), rela karna (Punjabi: ਰੇਲਾ ਕਰਨਾ), dhaak charhna (Punjabi: ਢਾਕ ਚਾੜਨਾ,) patti paina (Punjabi: ਪੱਟੀ ਪੈਣਾ), Multani marni (Punjabi: ਮੁਲਤਾਨੀ ਮਾਰਨੀ), andar tangi (Punjabi: ਅੰਦਰ ਟੰਗੀ), bahar tangi (Punjabi: ਬਾਹਰ ਟੰਗੀ), dhobi pattrha (Punjabi: ਧੋਬੀ ਪਟੜਾ), morha (Punjabi: ਮੋੜਾ), killi (Punjabi: ਕਿੱਲੀ), suttne hath pauna (Punjabi: ਸੂਟਨੇ ਹੱਥ ਪਾਉਣਾ), andarli te baharli marni (Punjabi: ਅੰਦਰਲੀ ਤੇ ਬਾਹਰਲੀ ਮਾਰਨੀ), sutt karni (Punjabi: ਸੁੱਟ ਕਰਨੀ), jholi karni (Punjabi: ਝੋਲੀ ਕਰਨੀ,) gaphuaa marna (Punjabi: ਗਫੂਆ ਮਾਰਨਾ), nkale puttna (Punjabi: ਨਕਾਲੋੰ ਪੁੱਟਣਾ), ghorhi pauni (Punjabi: ਘੋੜੀ ਪਾਉਣੀ), machhi gota marna (Punjabi: ਮੱਛੀ ਗੋਤਾ ਮਾਰਨਾ), goda tekna (Punjabi: ਗੋਡਾ ਟੇਕਣਾ), burhka kadhna (Punjabi: ਬੁੜਕਾ ਕੱਢਣਾ), saltu (Punjabi: ਸਾਲਤੂ), munna pherna (Punjabi: ਮੁੰਨਾ ਫੇਰਨਾ), karhunga (Punjabi: ਕੁੜੰਗਾ), joorh (Punjabi: ਜੂੜ), kulla (Punjabi: ਕੁੱਲਾ), chomukhya (Punjabi: ਚੌਮੁਖੀਆ), bagti (Punjabi: ਬਾਗੜੀ), raam baan (Punjabi: ਰਾਮ ਬਾਣ), porhi (Punjabi: ਪੌੜੀ), kunda (Punjabi: ਕੁੰਡਾ), ik tangi (Punjabi: ੲਿੱਕ ਤੰਗੀ), savari (Punjabi: ਸ਼ਵਾਰੀ), rerh (Punjabi: ਰੇੜ), charkha (Punjabi: ਚਰਖਾ), janeyoo (Punjabi: ਜਨੇਊ), (Punjabi: ਕਰਾਸ਼), puthi (Punjabi: ਪੁੱਠੀ), putha (Punjabi: ਪੁੱਠਾ), bagal (Punjabi: ਬਗਲ), savi (Punjabi: ਸ਼ਾਵੀ), dasti (Punjabi: ਦਸ਼ਤੀ), tega (Punjabi: ਤੇਗਾ).

=== Khuddo khoondi (Punjabi: ਖਿੱਦੋ ਖੂੰਡੀ) ===
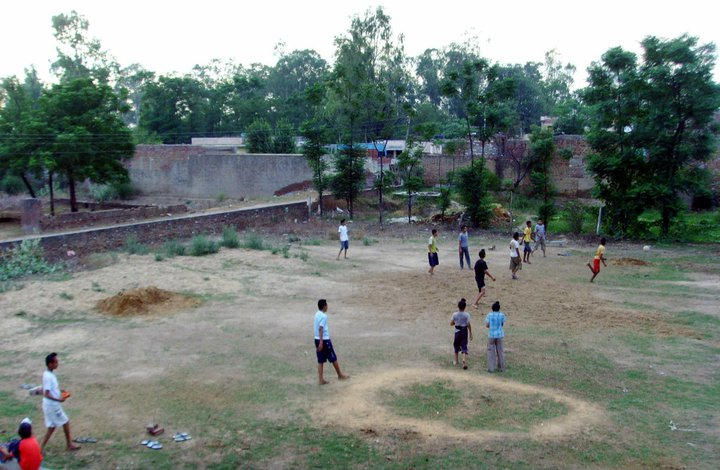
Desi Playground

Similar to field hockey, the game involves using a ball made of rags and a stick with a natural curve at one end. The stick would normally be a tree branch.

=== Gulli danda(Punjabi: ਗੁੱਲੀ ਡੰਡਾ) ===
Similar to cricket. Guli Danda is an amateur sport, popular among rural youth in the Punjab. It is a game played by boys individually and in a team depending upon the availability of players. It can be played in a variety of ways depending on the rule made at the beginning of game. In this game, a thick stick, almost three feet long and a small piece of wood which has sharp edges is needed, and a small piece of wood called gully which is hit with the stick (Danda) and the opposition has to out the player by catching the flying wood when it is hit by player.

=== Rassakashi (Punjabi: ਰੱਸਾਕਸ਼ੀ) ===
Tug of war pictogram

Tug of war with two teams: Men generally played this game but women also participate in the game. A line is drawn between the two teams, each having one end of the rope in its hands.

=== Dand parhangrha (Punjabi: ਡੰਡ ਪੜਾਂਗੜਾ) ===
A group of boys gather around a tree. A circle with a diameter of 2 1/2 feet is drawn. A short stick is placed in the circle. One boy is selected to pick the stick and throw it as far possible, by swinging it under his leg. Another boy is selected to collect the stick during which time all the boys run up the tree. The boy who has collected the stick places it in the circle. The other boys try to get the stick before being caught by the boy who placed it there. If the boy who placed the stick tags another player before anyone picks up the stick, the boy who has been tagged is the one who has to stay on the ground and try to tag another player. If a player picks up the stick before the original player on the ground who collected the stick tags another, the game ends and a new game start but the original player has to tag another player.

=== Bandar keela (Punjabi: ਬਾਂਦਰ ਕੀਲਾ) ===
This Game Start was Since 1902 5 October Boys play this game in winter by digging a pole into the ground and attaching a four-foot rope. All the boys place their shoes near the pole. The boy who is holding the rope (the key player) is meant to stop the other boys from getting their shoes. During the game, if the key player touches another player then that player becomes the key player(bandar) and the game goes on ....

=== Tibla tiblee (Punjabi: ਟਿਬਲਾ ਟਿਬਲੀ) ===
This is a boys and a teenagers game. The boys will form two teams. Team one will ask team two, "which house in the village has 3 (x) and 4(y)?" If the other team guess, they win but if not, the losing team will have to carry the winning boys on their backs to the house in question.

=== Rabb di Khuti (Punjabi: ਰਬ ਦੀ ਖੁਤੀ) ===
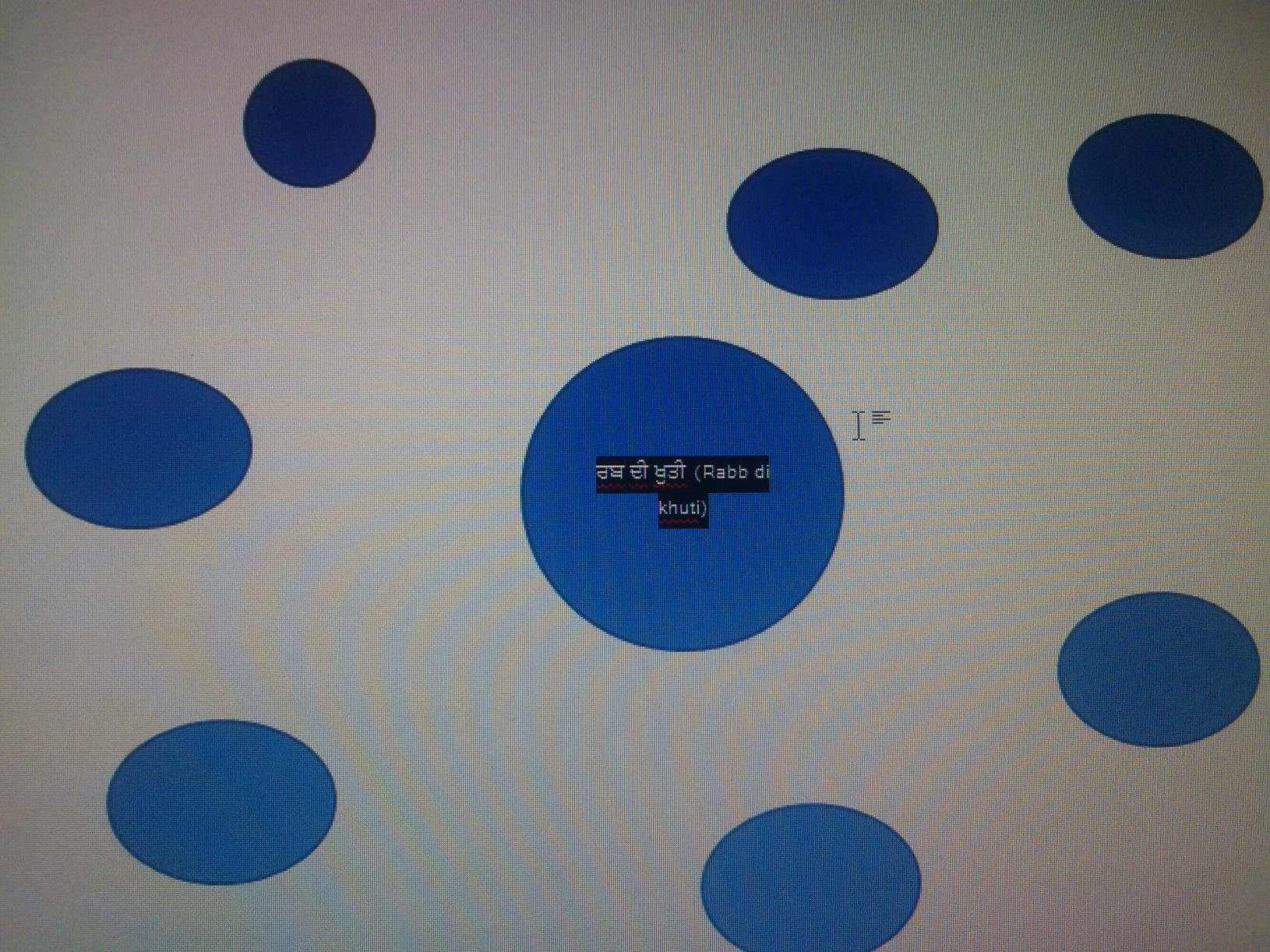
Punjabi game Rabb di khuti

The game is played by as many players wish to play who will select the key player (dyee). The players will use a soft ground and dig holes about 9" wide and 6" deep. Each hole is called a khuti. There will be as many holes as there are players. In the middle of the playing ground, a larger hole will be dug out and is referred to as rabb di khuti (God's hole).

The key player will throw a ball made of rags high into the air. The player that catches it will then be carried by the key player to enable key player to kick the ball into the hole. If he does, the two players switch and the key player will be carried enabling the other player to kick the ball. If the player kicks the ball into another player's hole, then the two will switch sides. This is repeated for all the players. If the ball lands in the rabb di khuti, the player who threw the ball will try to tag another player with the ball. All the other players try to avoid being hit.

=== Noon miani (Punjabi: ਨੂਣ ਮਿਆਣੀ) ===
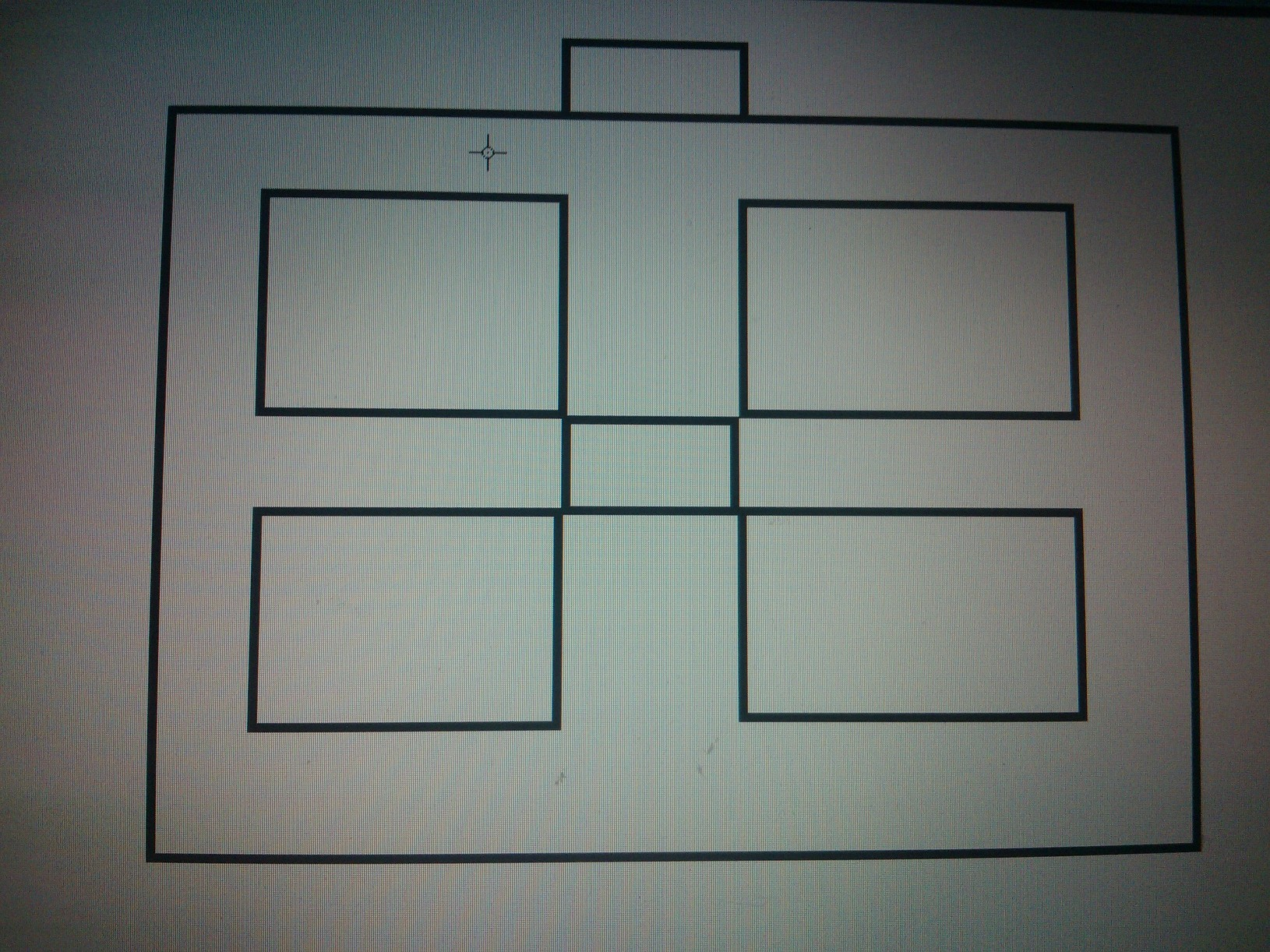
Punjabi game Noon Miani

The game is played on a grid on the ground with an approximate measurement of 25 meters in each side. 4 boxes of equal size are drawn in the grid leaving a 2-meter track on the outskirts. In the center of the grid, a fifth square is drawn filled with a heap of sand or soil (mitti di dheri (Punjabi: ਮਿਟੀ ਦੀ ਢੇਰੀ)) which represents salt. Outside the grid, another box is drawn on the northern edge, in the center which represents the store called sandook (Punjabi: ਸੰਦੂਕ).

The key player is selected to mind the salt in the center square. The other players try to get the salt and run along the pathways to go to the other side of the store. The key player's aim is to tag the other players.

To start the game, one player will touch the key player's hand and then run away to avoid being tagged. If the other players step into the 4 boxes in the grid, they will be killed and declared "madeen" (Punjabi: ਮਦੀਨ). The key player cannot go backwards on the track, until he reaches the end of the box, whilst remaining on the track. He cannot step into any box in the grid.

Players who take the salt and run across the store area are declared "nar" (Punjabi: ਨਰ.) The players who get tagged become "madeen". The key player will become "nar" after tagging another player. Otherwise, he will be "madeen". Once all players become either"nar" or "madeen", the game ends.

At this point, the players who have crossed the store area and have become "nar" will stand in a line. About 25 metres away, the "madeen" group will stand in a line. The "nar" players will ask the "madeen" players: "bil bachya di maa, roti pakki ai ki na?" (translation: bill's mother, are the chapattis made?) (Punjabi: ਬਿਲ ਬਚਿਆ ਦੀ ਮਾਂਂ. ਰੋਟੀ ਪਕੀ ਏ ਕਿ ਨਾ?). If the "madeen" group say no, the "nar" group will ask the question again until the "madeen" group say, yes. At this point, all the players run to tag each other. The "madeen" players who get tagged by the "nar" players, will need to carry them to the centre square. The game then starts again but this time, the key player will be the player who became "madeen" first.

=== Tipri ===
Tipri is a dance cum team sport played on the festive occasion of Vamana Dwadashi on the streets, predominantly in the current city of Patiala but also Ambala. The base of the sport is that each participating team member holds two sticks (similar to Dandiya sticks), in each of their hands, one attached with the rope to the concentric top of the circle that they play in. They move around in a rotating coupling fashion to entangle the complete elongated ropes in the centre, and then disentangle by performing in the reverse fashion.

== Female sports and games ==
=== Thaal (Punjabi: ਥਾਲ) ===
This is played by a group of girls using a ball made of seven layers of cloth. The ball is bounced in one hand with the girl singing rhymes. The girl who sings the longest is the winner.

=== Kikli (Punjabi: ਕਿੱਕਲੀ) ===
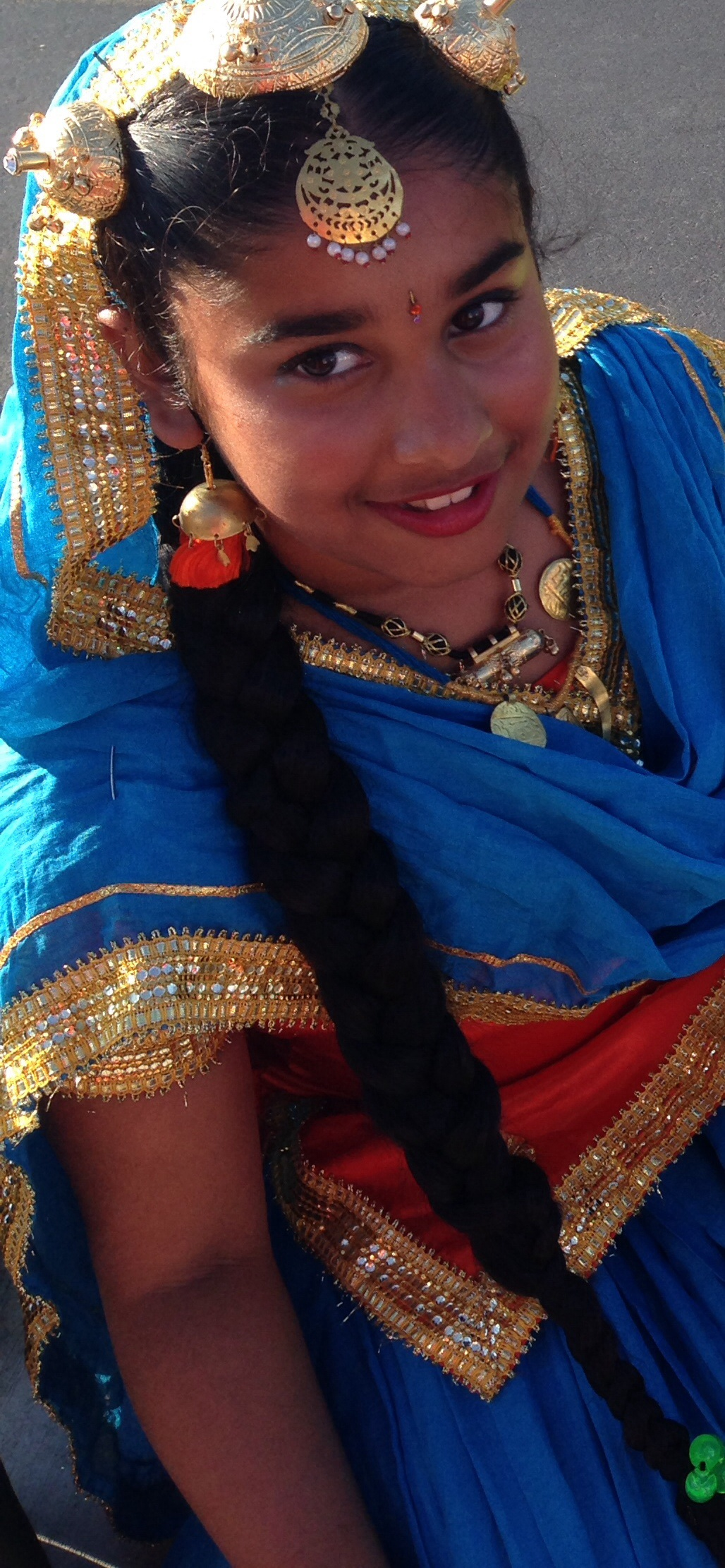
Ready to perform Punjabi kikli

Kikli is another game, basically for women. Two girls clasp their hands and move in circle. This is a game, which was played by two or four girls and multiple of two thereof.

Kikli kleer di
Pag mere vir dee
Daupatta mere bhai da
Phitte mun jawai da

Punjabi:

ਕਿਕਲੀ ਕਲੀਰ ਦੀ
ਪੱਗ ਮੇਰੇ ਵੀਰ ਦੀ
ਦੁਪੱਟਾ ਮੇਰੇ ਭਾਈਦਾ
ਫਿਟੇ ਮੂੰਹ ਜੁਵਾਈਦਾ

=== Adhi chharhappa (Punjabi: ਅੱਡੀ ਛੜੱਪਾ) ===
This is played by two teams of girls with around 6 players in each team. Two girls from team 1 will sit on the floor with their legs straight and their feet touching. A girl from team 2 will jump over the legs of the girls of team 1, without touching them. If she succeeds, two more girls from team 1 will join her team players on the floor thereby widening the area for the next player of team 1 to jump over. This carries on until all the girls from team 1 have jumped over the girls if team 2, after which the players of team 1 will sit on the floor.

=== Gheeta Pathar (Punjabi: ਗੀਟਾ ਪੱਥਰ) ===
Some pebbles, stones or broken earthenware can be broken further into pieces and used for playing Gheeta Pather. The players will draw a circle on the floor and throw 5 pieces into the circle. The aim of the game is to throw each stone into the air and catch it before it falls without touching the other stones. The player must collect all the stones in one hand.

=== Peecho bakree (Punjabi: ਪੀਚੋ ਬਕਰੀ) ===
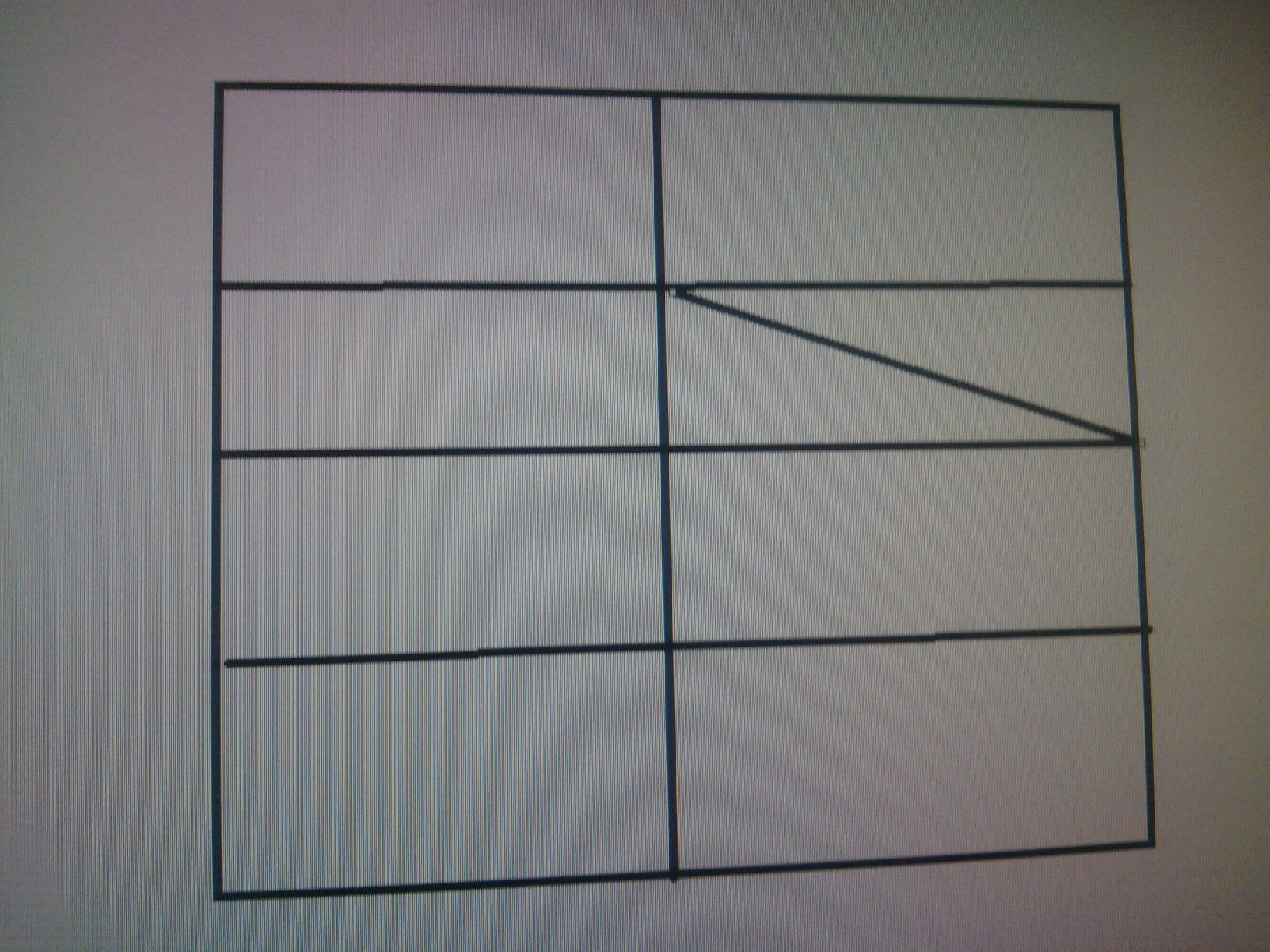
Peecho Bakree

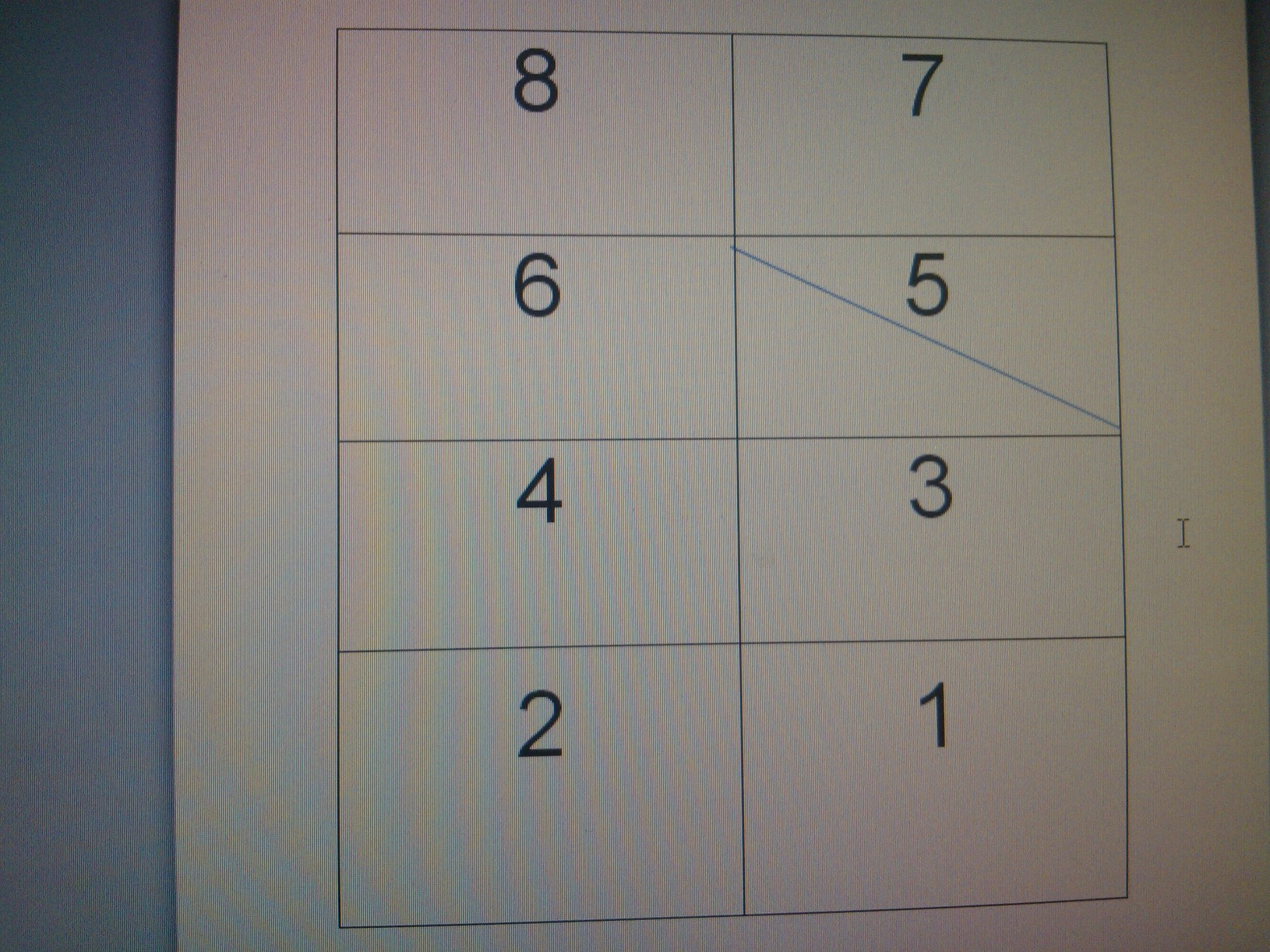
Punjabi game Peecho Bakri

Similar to hopscotch. It is also called adda khadda. The game involves drawing 8 or 10 boxes on the ground. Starting on the right, the boxes will be numbered going across with box 5 on the right having a diagonal line.

The player will throw the stone on box 1 and hop onto box 1. Whilst hopping, using the other leg, the player will kick the stone across to box 2 and then hop to that box. The aim is to hop to each box whilst ensuring the stone does not go out of the intended box. When the player gets to box 5, she will need to put both feet in each section of the box and then continue to the other boxes.

=== Hara samundar (Punjabi: ਹਰਾ ਸਮੁੰਦਰ) ===
A group of girls stand in a circle and link arms. One girl stand in the middle. The area in the circle is meant to be the sea. The girls forming the ring ask the girl in the middle, how deep is the water in sequence. She would reply, ankle deep and then say knee deep, waist deep, neck deep and finally "I am drowning" at which point she would fall to the ground. The other girls would break the chain and save her. The game is repeated with another girl in the middle.

=== Khidu (Punjabi: ਖਿਦੂ) ===
The girls sing rhymes along with a Khidu (Ball), in fact these rhymes and the game is more suitable for children. The rounds continue until the end by counting ten and singing the tenth song.

=== Pangurha (Punjabi: ਪੰਘੂੜਾ) ===
Pangurha is a game played by small girls. Normally, the game involves 8 players with 4 players sitting on the floor with their legs stretched out touching each other's’ feet. The 4 standing players will hold the hands of the players on the floor and swing the arms left and then right in slow motion. The movements gradually become faster giving the seated girls the feeling they are on a fairground ride. The standing players will then take the place of the seated players and the game continues.

== Games for boys and girls ==
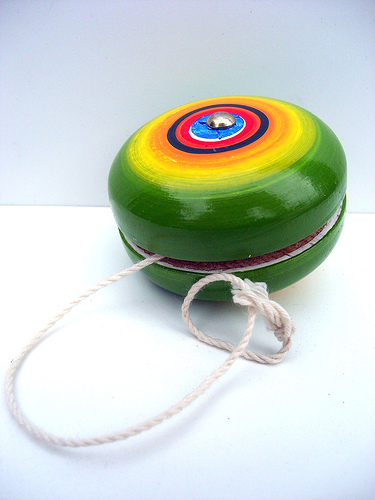
Wooden yo-yo

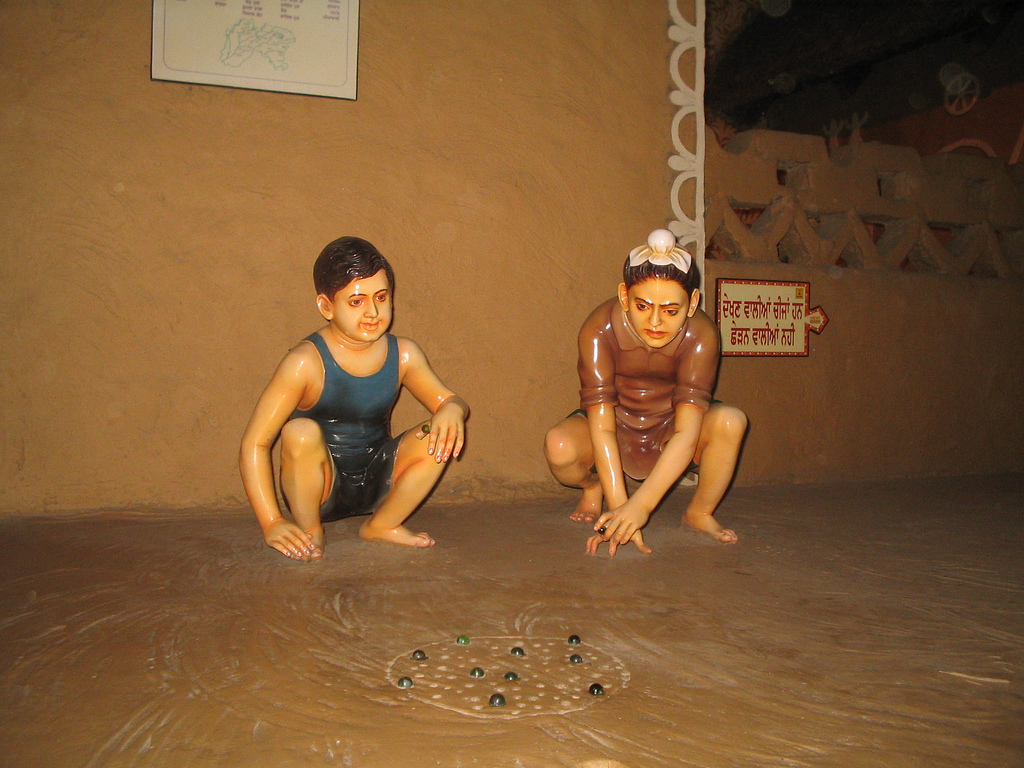
Sculpture depicting village kids playing marbles jalandhar Punjab haveli rangla Punjab

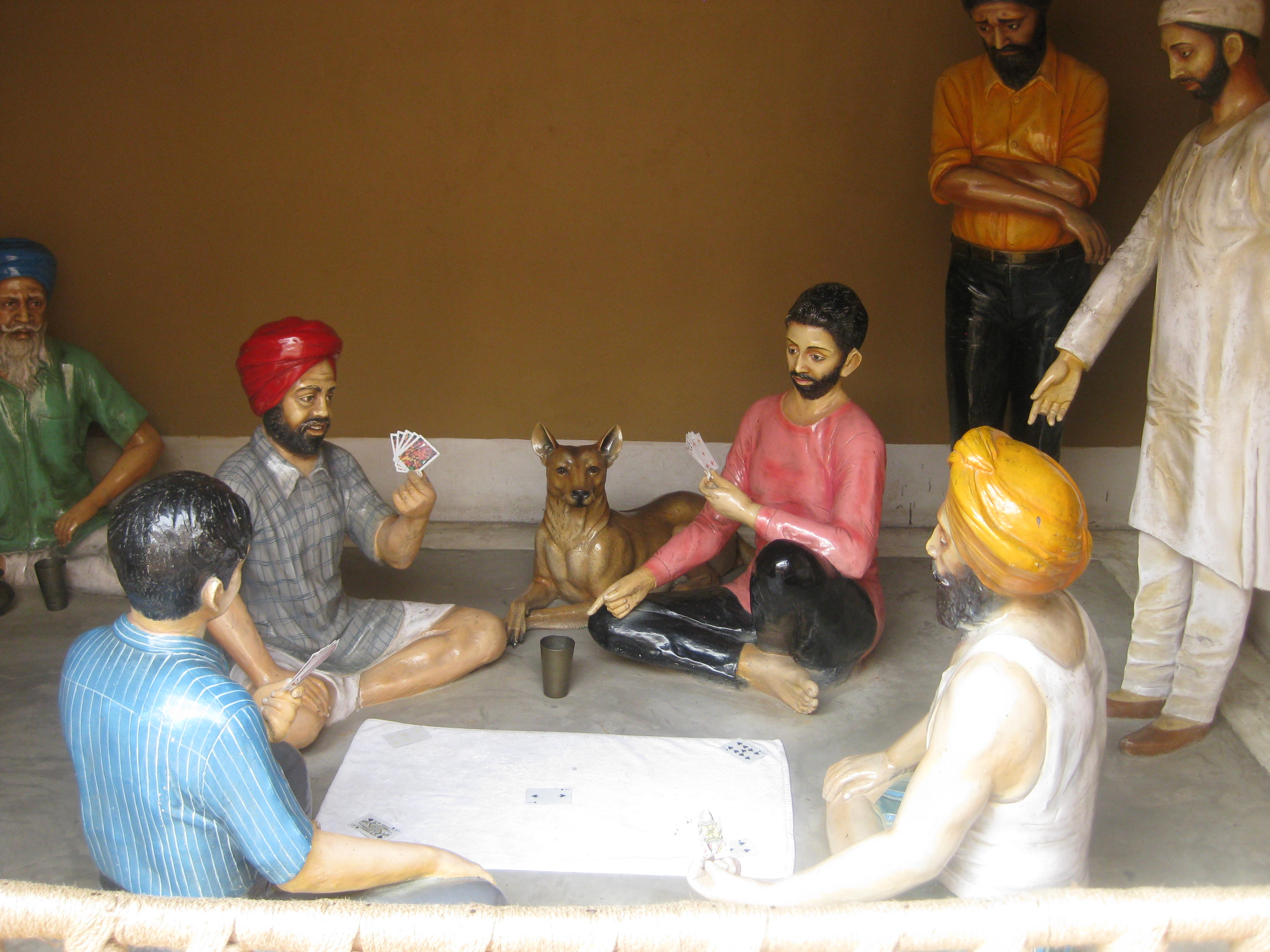
Rangla Panjab

=== Lattoo (Punjabi: ਲਾਟੂ) (yo-yo) ===
Played mostly by boys.

=== Bantey (Punjabi: ਬੰਟੇ) ===
Marble games.

=== Chicho Chich Ganerian (Punjabi: ਚੀਚੋ ਚੀਚ ਗਨੇਰੀਆਂ) ===
This game is for both boys and girls. It is generally played by two teams and involves drawing as many vertical lines as possible.

=== Kidi Kada or Stapoo (Punjabi: ਸਟਾਪੋ) ===
This is a game played both by the girls and boys. This game is played with in small boundary (court), drawn on the ground and a piece of stone.

=== Shatranj (Punjabi: ਸ਼ਤਰੰਜ) (Chess) ===
The Punjab Chess Association governs the game at a professional level.

=== Lukan Miti (Punjabi: ਲੁਕਣ ਮੀਟੀ) (hide and seek) ===
This is also played by both boys and girls and continues to this day. Two teams can also play this. One has to hide, the other has to seek but before doing so a call is given.

=== Kokla Chhapaki (Punjabi: ਕੋਕਲਾ ਛਪਾਕੀ) ===
This game is popular even today amongst children. It is similar to Drop Handkerchief, a variation of duck, duck, goose. Both boys and girls play it. Children sit in a circle and the child who has the cloth in his hand goes around the circle-singing: it is a kind of a warning for the children sitting in a circle not to look back. The cloth is then dropped at the back of a child. If it is discovered before the child who had placed it there had completed the round, the child who discovered the cloth would run after him and try to touch him with it till he sits in the place vacated by the one who had discovered the cloth.

The song sung during the game is:

Kokla Chapaki Jumeraat aayi aye
jera agge pichey wekhey
ohdi shamat aayi aye

Meaning:

Kokla Chapaki, it is Thursday.
Whoever looks here and there
shall be punished.

Punjabi:

ਕੋਕਲਾ ਛਪਾਕੀ ਜੁਮੇ ਰਾਤ ਆਈ ਏ
ਜੇਹੜਾ ਅਗੇ ਪਿਛੇ ਦੇਖੇ
ਉਹਦੀ ਸ਼ਾਮਤ ਆਈ ਏ

=== Alliye Pattaliye (Punjabi: ਅੱਲੀਏ ਪਟੱਲੀਏ) ===
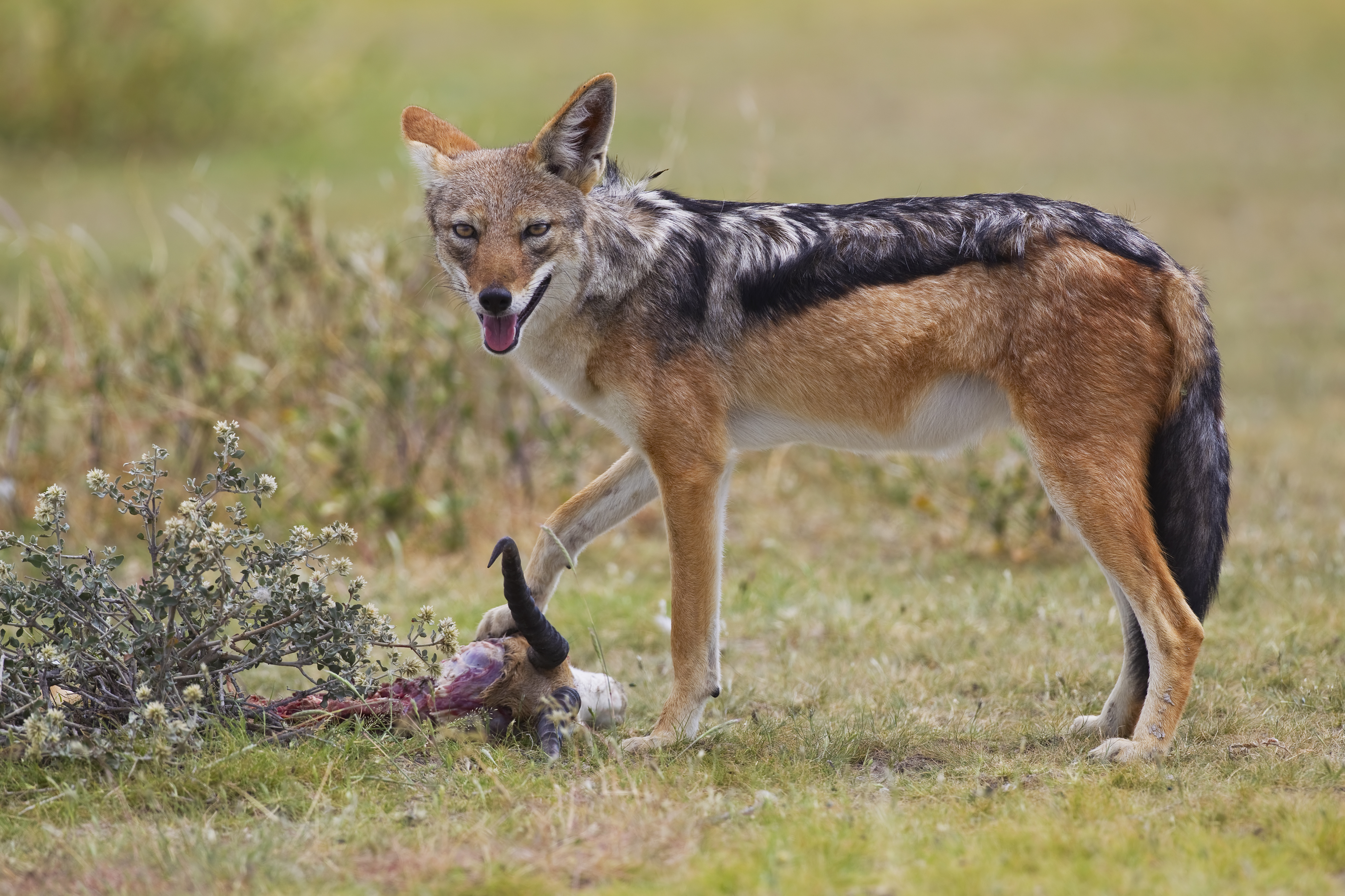
Gidhar team pretend to be jackals

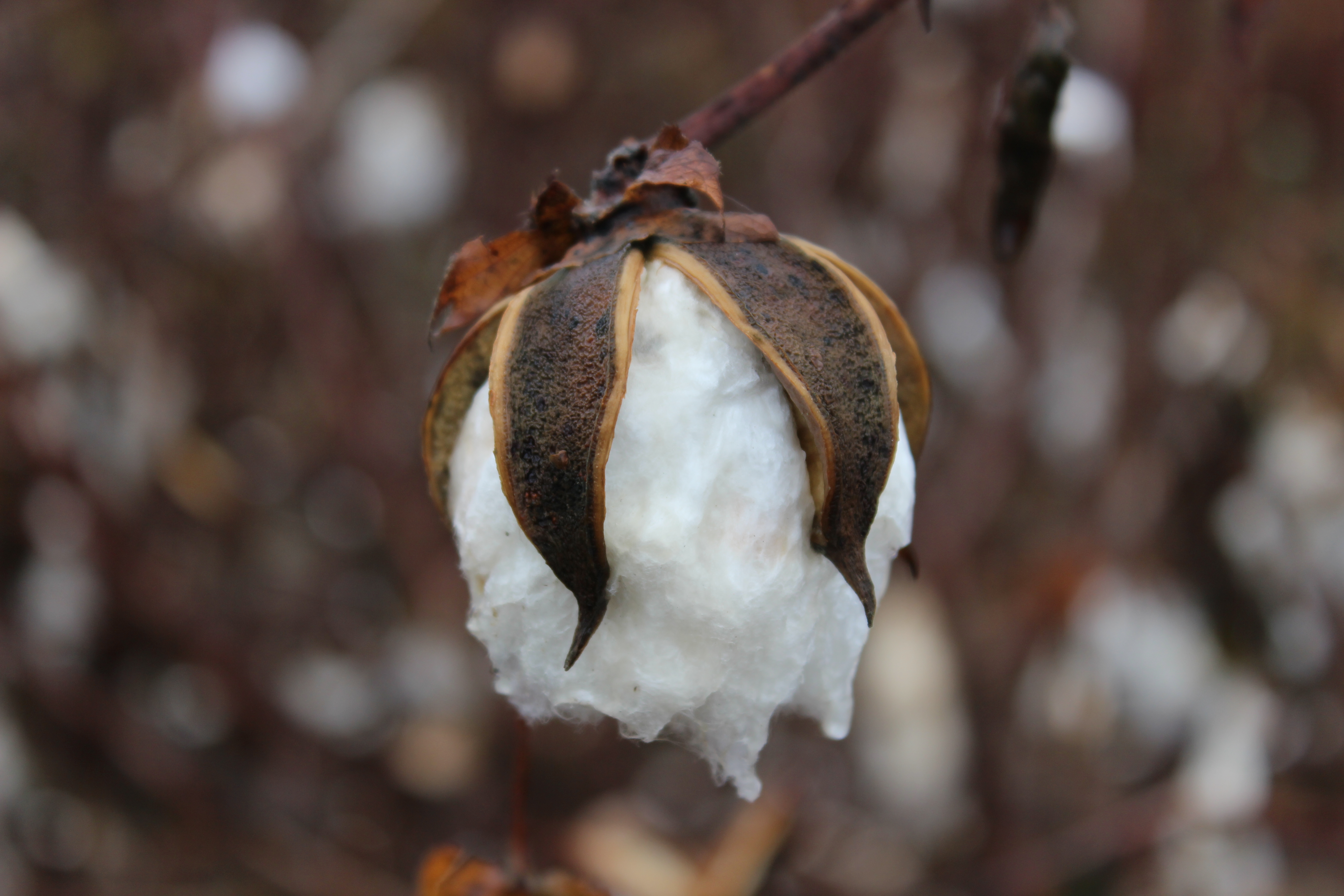
Chogyan team pretend to pick cotton

The game is played by two groups of children. One group pretend to be jackals (Gidharh, (Punjabi: ਗਿੱਦੜ)) and the other, pickers (chogian, (Punjabi: ਚੋਗੀਆ)). There is a line drawn between the two groups. The pickers sing the following song which calls for their members to pick the fields but then warns the group that there are jackals ahead.

Punjabi:

ਅੱਲੀਏ ਪਟੱਲੀਏ
ਕਪਾਹ ਚੁਗਣ ਚੱਲੀਏ
ਮੂਹਰੇ ਬੈਠੇ ਗਿੱਦੜ
ਪਿਛਾਂਹ ਮੁੜ ਚੱਲੀਏ

alye patalye
kapah chugan chalye
moohre bether gidharh
pichhah murh chalye

The chogyan team will jump over line and bend from the waist and pretend to pick the cotton flowers from the fields. The jackals will chase the other team. If a jackal tags the other team player, that player will join the jackal team. Once all players join the jackal team, the game starts all over again.

=== Bhanda bhandarya (Punjabi: ਭੰਡਾ ਭੰਡਾਰੀਆ) ===
This game is played by a group of about 15 children. The key player sits on the floor and the rest form a circle around him and place their fists on top of each other's fists. Then the children ask the key player:

Punjabi:

ਭੰਡਾ ਭੰਡਾਰੀਆ
ਕਿੰਨਾ ਕੁ ਭਾਰ

bhanda bhandarya
kinna ku bhar

Translation:

bhanda bhandarya
what is the weight

The key player's response will be:

Punjabi:

ਇਕ ਮੱਠੀ ਚੁੱਕ ਲੈ
ਦੂਈਤਿਆਰ

ik muthi chuk lai
dui tyar

Translation:

lift one fist
the other is ready

As soon as the last player lifts his fists, all the children will run away singing:

Punjabi:

ਹਾਏ ਕੁੜੇ ਦੰਦਈਆ ਲੜ ਗਿਆ
ਬੂਈਕੁੜੇ ਦੰਦਈਆ ਲੜ ਗਿਆ

hay kurhe dandayaa larh gya
bui kurhe dandayaa larh gya

Translation:

I have been bitten
I have been bitten

The key player will then chase the other players to tag another player to start the game all over again.

=== Kooka kanghrhey (Punjabi: ਕੂਕਾਂ ਕਾਂਘੜੇ) ===
Kooka kanghrhey involves a two groups of children: one group is called the owners the other is called servants. There is no limit to the number of players or their age.

The game is played by dividing the village lane into two halves for use by each group. Each group will draw as many lines on the hidden parts of the houses as possible. The aim is to prevent the opponent's team from finding the lines.

==== Part 1 ====
Both teams gather at the centre part of the lane. One player of either team will say "kooka kanghrey" (Punjabi: ਕੂਕਾਂ ਕਾਂਘੜੇ)or "patt patteellay" (Punjabi: ਪਟ ਪਟੀਲੋ). At this point the two groups will start to draw the lines. The group that finishes drawing the lines first will send a player to the centre of the lane to shout "kooka kanghrey" or "patt pattellay". At this point all the players stop drawing lines.

==== Part 2 ====
The two groups will go to the opponent team's part of the lane. The aim is to find the lines drawn by the other team and then strike lines through those lines. After this is done, the team assembles at the starting place.

==== Part 3 ====
The two groups will count how many of their lines have been struck through and how many have been left unmarked. The winning team will be the one with the larger number of unmarked lines.

=== Pithoo (Punjabi: ਪਿੱਠੂ) ===
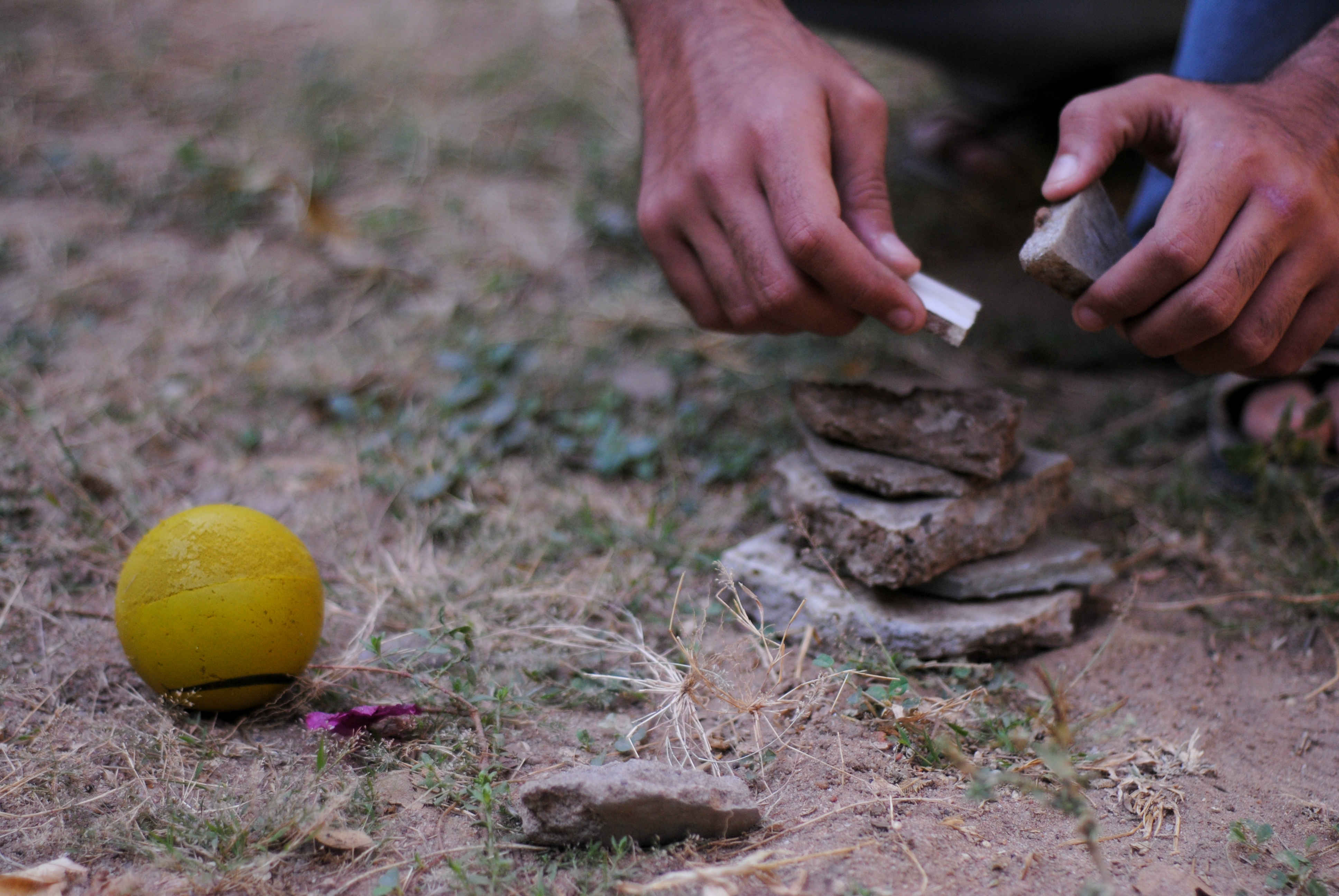
Pittu Garam stones

Also called Pithoo garam.

- How to play:
  - 10 people or more.
  - Two teams compete against each other.
  - The number of players in each team can be unlimited.
  - Need a soft rubber ball and few flat disc stones.
  - One of the team is given a chance to be a striker and the other is called fielder team.
  - The captain members of both the teams stand facing each other at a distance of 10 to 15 feet, and the ball being placed between them, respective team members make a queue and line up behind their respective team captain.
  - The captain of the striker team tries to hit the stone tower with the ball with a direct hit. If the ball does not hit the stones and is caught by any of the opposite team member after a single bounce, the captain is marked out of the game and have to sit outside the field and wait till his team has finished their turn. This way each member has a turn from the striker team and if is marked out has to sit outside the field, till all members are out, then the opposite team gets to be the striker team.
  - When the ball hits the stone tower, the stones scatter on the ground and everybody can be seen running around the field. At this time the striker team members try to fix the stone tower back without getting hit by the ball. The job of the fielder team is to hit the ball to as many members of the striker team before the striker team members can build the stone tower back up.
  - This chaos ends if members of striker team are unable to build the stone tower back up and get hit by the ball or they successfully build the tower. If the tower is built back, the striker team can accumulate points or can also call any one member of their team from outside of the field is any one was sent out. Once all the members of the striker team are out, then the opposite team gets a chance to be the striker and the game starts again.

== General ==
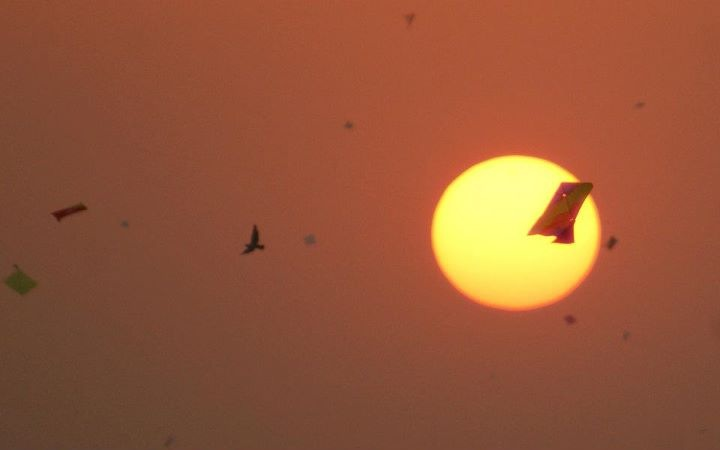
Kite flying

=== Kite Flying (Patang Bazi) ===
Flying kites is especially popular in festivals such as Basant and Lohri. Kite flying on Lohri is popular in some parts of Punjab. People get onto the roof tops and fly kites of various sizes and colours.

=== Races ===
Camel and bullockcart races, cock fights in addition to Kabutar bazi, chakore bazi and bater bazi.

== Board games ==
=== Chauparh OR Pasha (Punjabi: ਚੌਪੜ) ===
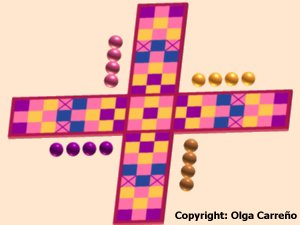
Chauparh using modern accessories

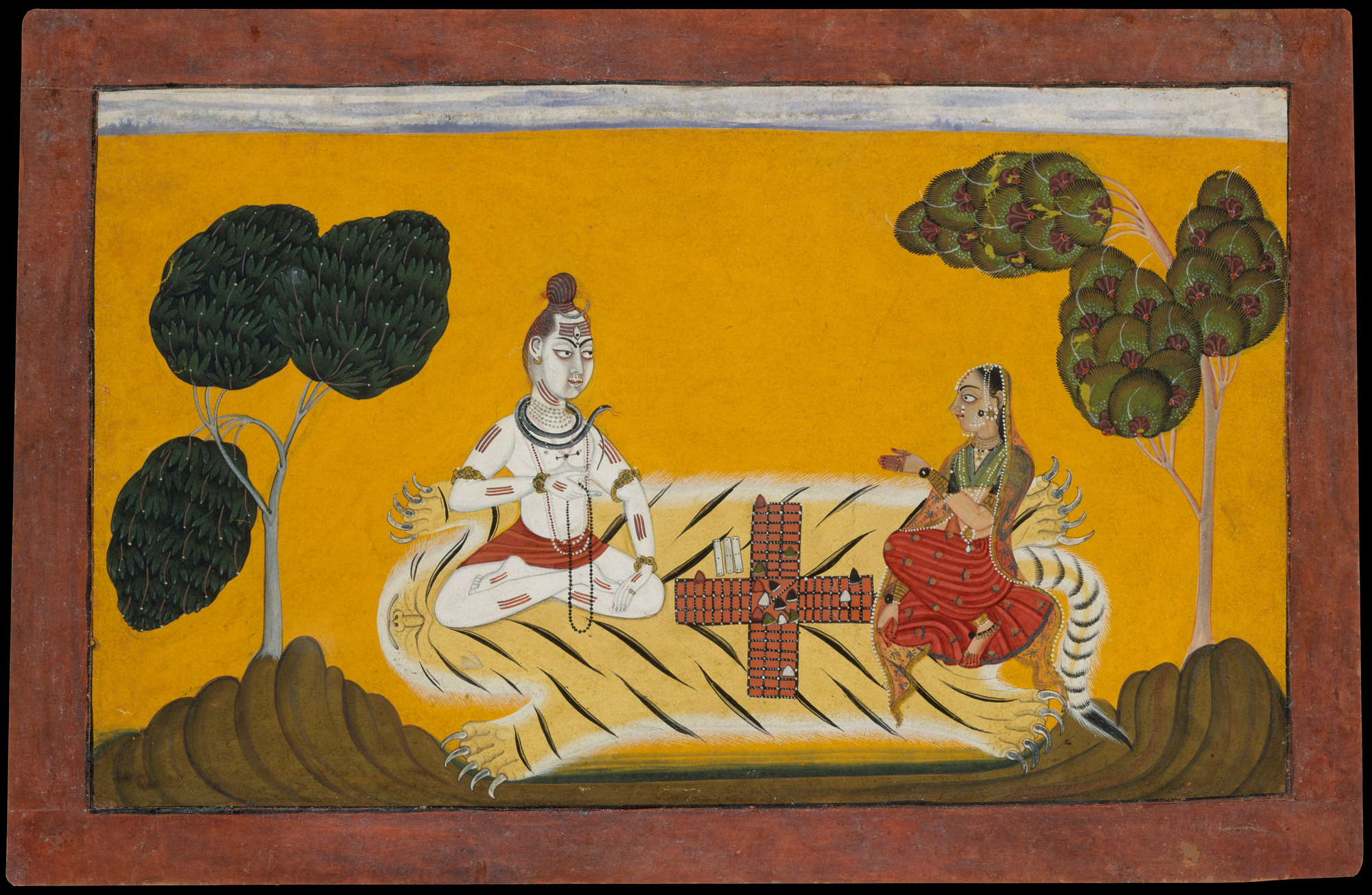
Shiva parvati chaupar 1694–95

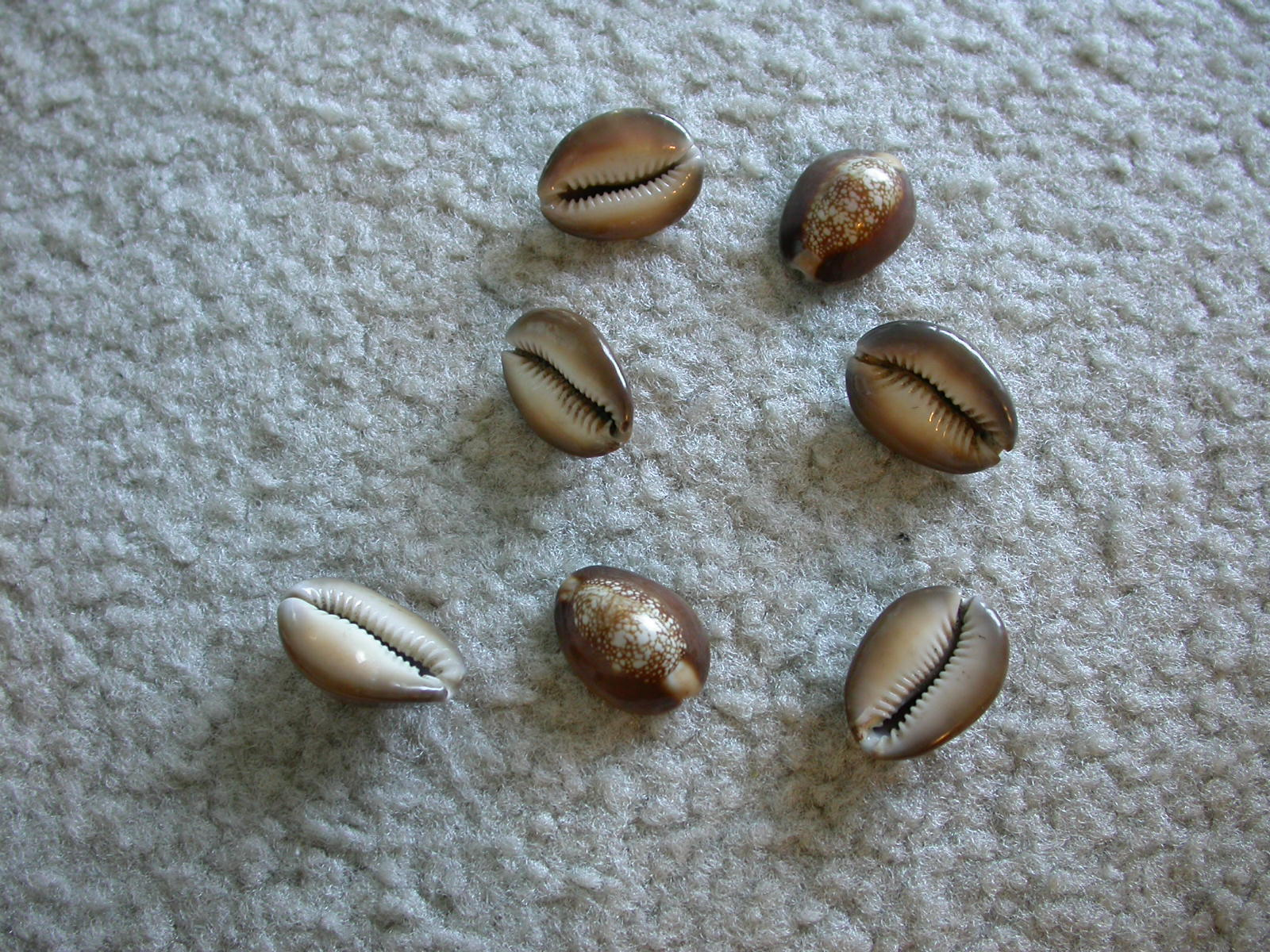
Score of 25 points

==== History ====
Chauparh is a very ancient game. There is reference to it being played in the Mahabharat. Further, the Punjabi narrative Raja Rasalu mentions the Prince playing Chauparh.

==== The game ====
Chauparh is also called Chaupat and Sara Passa (Punjabi: ਸਾਰਾ ਪਾਸਾ). The game involves concentration and is played with 4 players. If there are more players, then teams of 4 are formed with each team have 2 players on each side. The game is played on the floor using the following:

- 7 Kaudian (Punjabi: ਕੌਡੀਆਂ). A Kaudi is a shell.
- Each player is to have 4 pieces of coloured cloth called gotta (Punjabi: ਗੋਟਾ);
- A cloth called Chauparh. Chaupar is made of two cotton or woolen strips intersecting each at right angles making a cross with four segments. The pieces are moved on the board according to throw of the Kaudian with the aim to enter ‘home’ on the Chauparh. If this is not available, then the boxes are drawn on the floor.

One player throws the Kaudian into the air with the aim of obtaining a "Pa-oo" (Punjabi: ਪਾਉ), which is achieved as follows:

- 6 Kaudian are upright and one lands face down;
- 6 Kaudian are downright and one is upright; or
- 5 Kaudian are upright and 2 land facing down.

The gotta (coloured cloth) is moved as follows:

- If 6 Kaudian are upright and one lands face down then eleven moves are gained on the Chauparh.
- If 5 Kaudian are upright and 2 land facing down then 2 moves on the Chauparh.
- If 3 Kaudian are upright and 4 land face down then 3 moves are gained.
- If 4 Kaudian are upright and 3 downright then 4 moves are gained
- If 5 Kaudian are upright and 2 land downright then 25 moves are gained. (This is also called Athh (8)).
- If 6 Kaudian are upright and 1 lands downright then 35 moves are gained. (This is also called pentar).
- If 7 Kaudian are upright then 14 moves are gained.
- If 7 Kaudan land upright then 7 moves are gained.

In order to move the coloured gotta on the Chauparh, a pa-oo is necessary. If a player has 1 pa-oo, then he can move 1 gotta on the Chauparh. If he has 2 pa-oo, then 2 boxes. The aim is to "kill" the opponents gotta which is done by the opponent scoring the same points as represented by the gotta. A gotta cannot be "killed" if it is on the square with a spinning wheel.

=== Khadda OR Gaji Chara (Punjabi: ਖੱਡਾ) ===
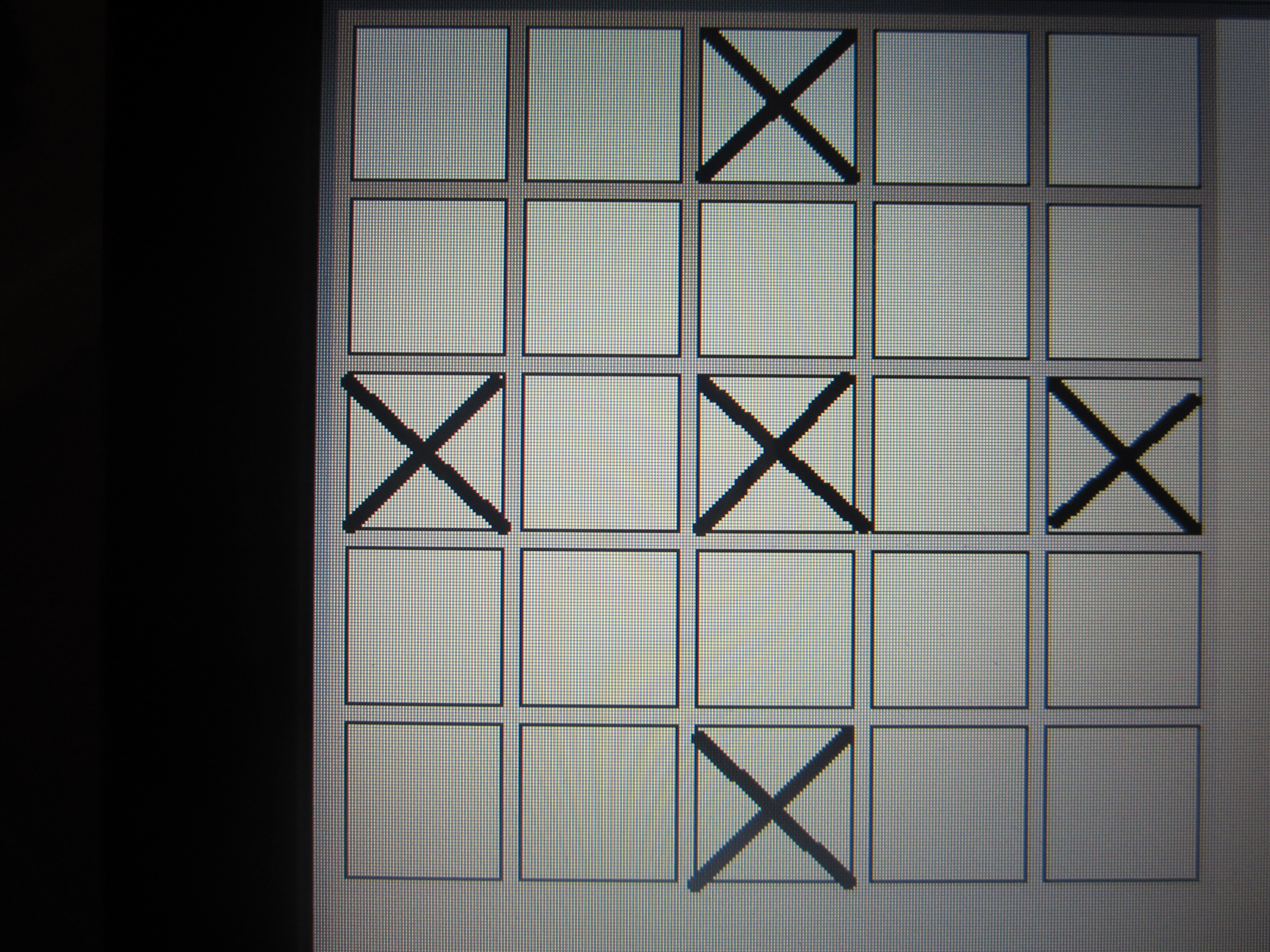
Punjabi game Khadda

This game is played by drawing a grid on the floor with 5 rows and 5 columns creating 25 squares. On the top and bottom rows, the middle box will be cross hatched. On the first and the fifth columns, the middle box will be cross hatched. The centre box will also be cross hatched.

Between 2 and 4 players can play the game, using 4 Kaudian Punjabi: ਕੌਡੀਆਂ (shells). A player will throw the Kaudian on the floor. If 1 shell lands upright and three land face down, the player can move one place to the next house. If 3 land upright and 1 facedown, the player can move 3 boxes. If 4 shells land downright, the player can move 8 boxes. If 4 shells land upright, the player can move 4 boxes.

If a player moves 8 boxes, he can throw the Kaudian again, and if the 4 Kaudian land facedown, the player can throw the Kaudian again for a third time. If on the third throw, the player's Kaudian all land facedown giving him 8 moves, the player has to go back to square 1 and start again.

The game proceeds by going around the grid and reaching the centre box.

=== Borha khu (Punjabi: ਬੋੜਾ ਖੂਹ) ===
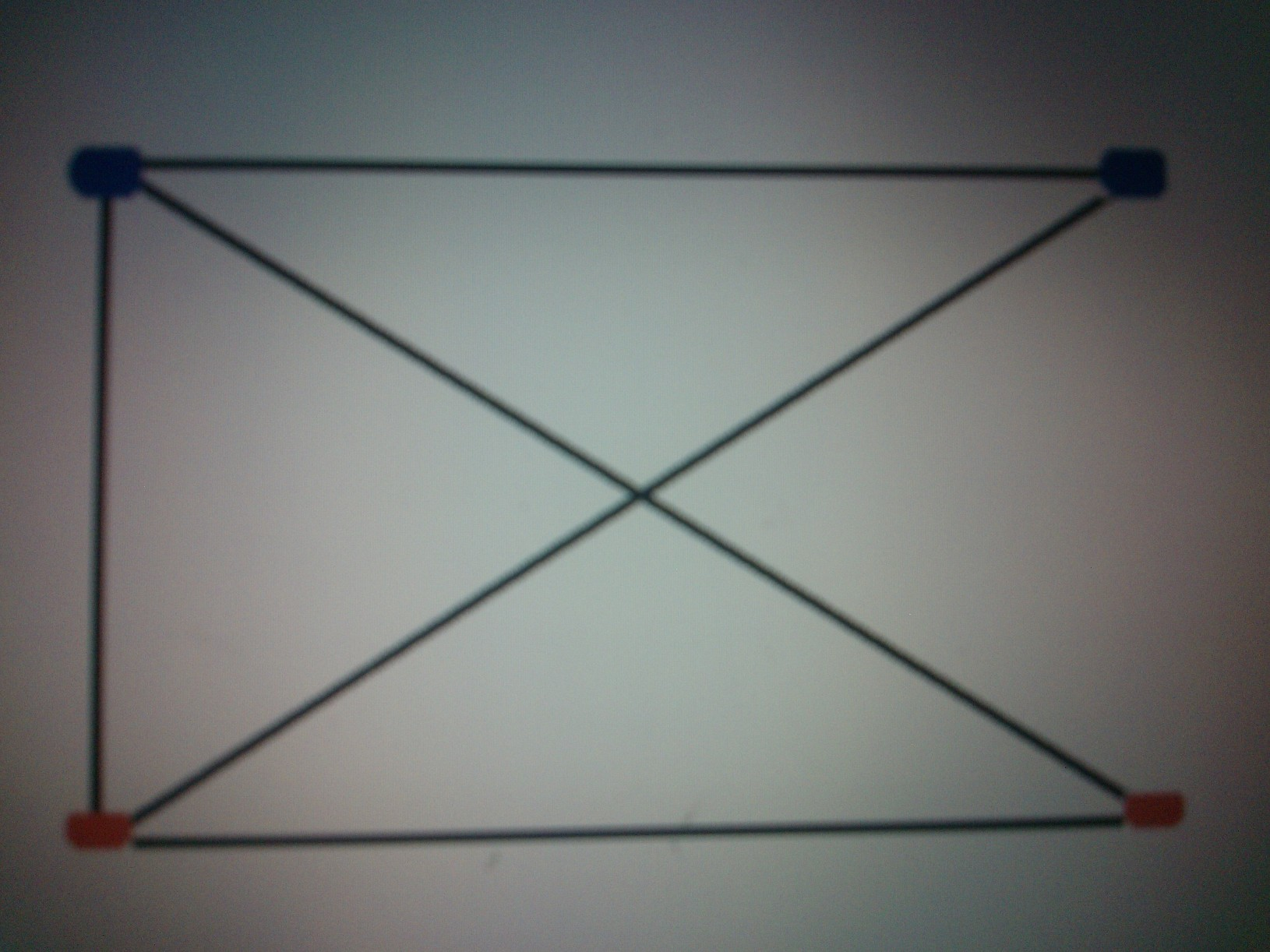
Punjabi game Borha Khu

==== How to play ====
- Borha khu is played by two players.
- Player 1 will use stones.
- Player 2 will use small wood pieces.
- Player 1 will place the stones on points 1 and 2.
- Player 2 will place the wood pieces on points 3 and 4.
- The middle point will be left empty.
- The aim is to move along the lines and kill the opponent's piece.

== See also ==
- Kila Raipur Sports Festival
- Pehlwani
- Sports in Punjab
- Health in Punjab
