= Health in Punjab, India =

Overview of health in Punjab

Health in Punjab involves the state of complete physical, mental and social well-being of the people in Punjab, India. Data of medical facilities, diseases and nutrition is used to determine the state of health of the population.

== History ==
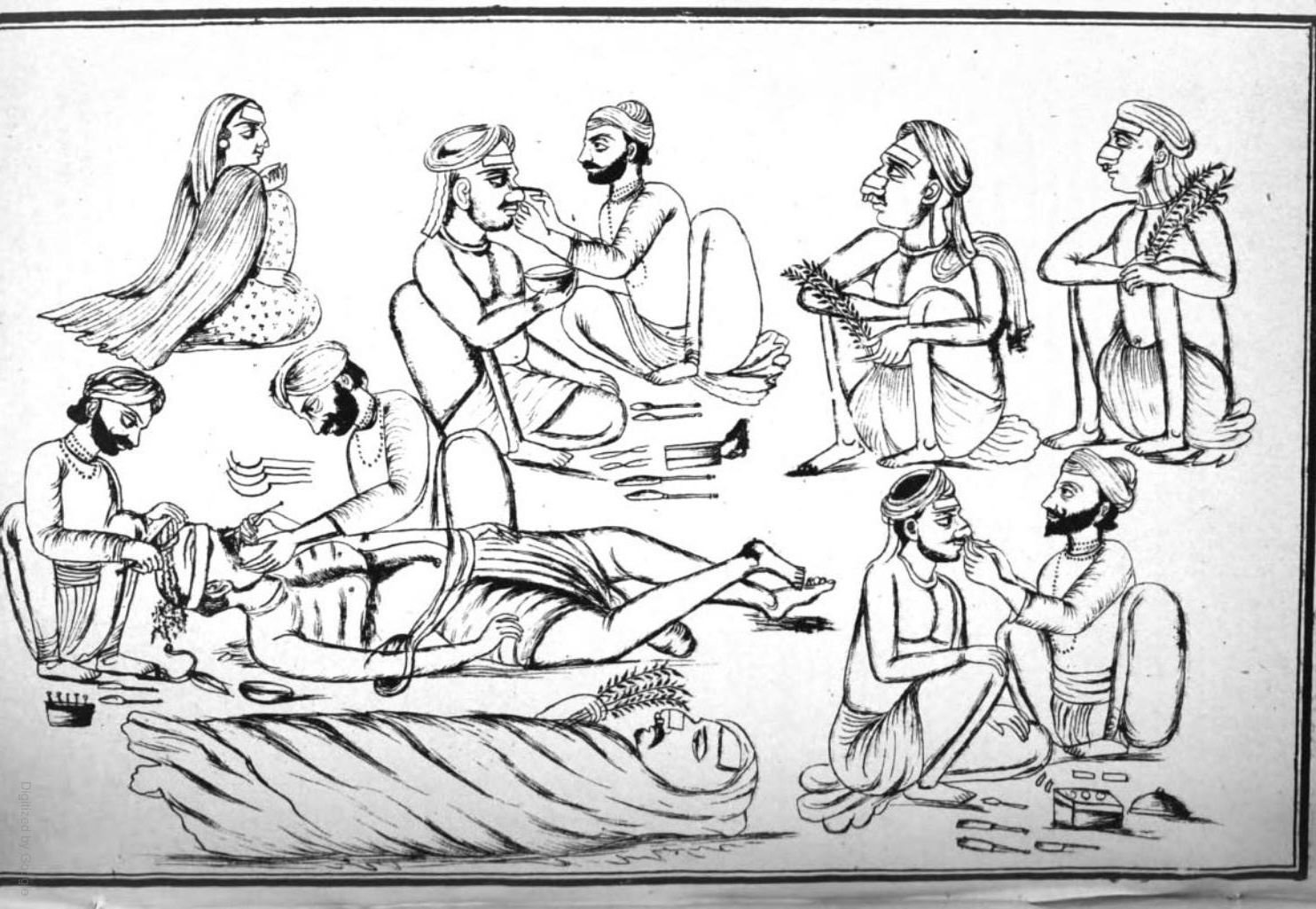
Illustration of a scene of a native surgery in the Punjab, published in the 'Hand-book of the Manufactures & Arts of the Punjab' (1872) by Baden Henry Baden-Powell

Between 1896 and 1921, 12 major cholera outbreaks were recorded in Punjab province, which killed about 250,000 people. In 1901, riots were recorded in some plague-hit areas, like Gurdaspur, Patiala and Sialkot as some people refused compulsory hospitalisation and quarantine. From 1897 to 1947, more than 3,000,000 people died due to plague in Punjab province. In 1896, plague came from Hong Kong in India. In October 1897, first death from plague was reported in Punjab. Initially, the plague spread in Jalandhar and Hoshiarpur districts. By 1903, it had spread to almost all districts and caused large-scale causality in the province.

In March 1902, in Mulkowal village in Punjab province, 19 people died from tetanus after receiving plague vaccine. Initial investigation blamed Dr. Waldemar Haffkine, who had discovered the plague vaccine, and he was fired from his position as a director of plague lab. But later investigations found that a bottle was accidentally contaminated at the inoculation site in the village and not in the lab. Haffkine was finally exonerated and allowed to return to India for employment, but he was not allowed to carry out any trials and limited to theoretical research.

Between in 1953 and 1960, an influential research called 'Khanna study' was conducted in seven villages of Ludhiana district, with field headquarters in Khanna town. Its aim was to study population dynamics and to measure the effects of population control program on birth rate. The study is generally considered a failure because very few people accepted or used contraceptive methods like vaginal foam tablets. This led to the conclusion that the mere availability of contraceptives does not ensure their use. According to anthropologist Mahmood Mamdani, this was because most people considered children as an economic necessity, as they needed large families for labour and physical security.

Pentavalent vaccine was introduced in Punjab on January 7, 2015. By March 2020, COVID-19 pandemic reached Punjab. On 22 March 2020, government of Punjab imposed state-wide lockdown to combat COVID-19 pandemic in Punjab.

In 2026, the AAP-run Punjab state government has introduced the Mukh Mantri Sehat Bima Yojana scheme to provide Rs 10 lakh health insurance coverage to all families in Punjab by issuing health-cards, the first such universal health insurance coverage program in an Indian state. The state scheme works in-conjugation with the national Ayushman Bharat scheme.

== Birth ==
In 2019–21, 94.3% of the births were institutional births in Punjab, which was an increase from 90.5% in 2015–16. Of this, 53.9% were institutional births in public facility, which was up from 51.7% in 2015–16. In rural areas, the births in public facility were 57.6%, compared to 47.0% in urban areas, for year 2019–21. The percentage of home births that were conducted by a skilled health personnel was 2.6%, it was 3.0% for urban areas and 2.3% for rural areas. In 2015–16, this percentage was 4.5%. Of the total, 95.6% births were attended by a skilled health personnel, in 2019–21. For urban areas, this rate was 93.7% and 96.6% for rural areas.

Of the total births in Punjab, 38.5% were delivered by caesarean section in 2019–21. This number was 24.6% in 2015–16. For private health facilities, 55.5% of the births were by caesarean section, in 2019–20, compared to 29.9% for public health facilities. In 2015–16, this number was 39.7% for private and 29.9% for public health facilities. For private health facilities, the rate was 57.0% for rural areas and 53.4% for urban areas in 2019–21. For public health facilities, the rate was 29.1% in rural areas and 31.1% in urban areas, in the same year.

=== Life expectancy ===
Between 2013 and 2017, the life expectancy at birth in Punjab was 72.4 years. It was 74 years for females and 71 for males.

The table below shows the life expectancy in Punjab by gender and residence in 2013–17.

Life expectancy in Punjab in 2013–17
Residence	Total	Female	Male
Rural	71.4	72.9	70.1
Urban	74.1	76.6	72.4
Total	72.4	74	71

Estimated from civil registration and vital statistics system (CRVSS) data, the table below shows the life expectancy in the districts of Punjab, in 2012.

Estimated life expectancy in the districts of Punjab, in 2012, based on CRVSS data
District	Male (Years)	Female (Years)
Amritsar	64	69
Bathinda	71	81
Barnala	70	76
Faridkot	67	73
Fatehgarh Sahib	72	77
Firozpur	74	80
Gurdaspur	70	76
Hoshiarpur	68	75
Jalandhar	63	69
Kapurthala	74	84
Ludhiana	69	77
Mansa	69	76
Moga	70	74
Muktsar	69	66
Patiala	68	72
Rupnagar	69	75
SAS Nagar	70	76
Sangrur	70	76
SBS Nagar	64	75
Taran Taran	66	73

== Children ==
According to the national family health survey of 2020–21, anaemia rate in Punjab was 71.1% for children between the ages of 0 and 57 months. This was a significant increase compared to 56.6% in 2015–16. According to the National Family Health Survey (NFHS) data from 2015 to 2016, the rate stunting (low height for age) for children between the ages of 0 and 59 months was 26%, which was lower than the national average of 38%.

The table below shows the data from the state nutrition profile of Punjab of children below the age of 6, by years.

State nutrition profile of Punjab of children below the age of 6, by years
Indicators	2019–21	2015–16	2005-6
Low birth weight	22%	17%	28%
Stunting	24%	26%	37%
Wasting	11%	16%	9%
Sever Wasting	4%	6%	2%
Underweight	17%	12%	25%
Anemia	71%	57%	66%

== Women ==
As of 2020, the percentage of deaths due to heart disease was higher in women than men, 41.8% for females compared to 32.2% for males. In the same year, the percentage of deaths due to COVID-19 was lower for women compared to men, 13.4% for males and 9.9% for females.

The table below shows the state nutrition profile of Punjab for women between the ages of 15 and 49 years.

State nutrition profile of Punjab of women below the age of 15 to 49, by years
Indicators	2019–21	2015–16	2005-6
Underweight	13%	12%	19%
Anemia (non-preg)	59%	54%	38%
Anemia (pregnant)	52%	42%	42%
Hypertension	31%	15%	NA
Diabetes	15%	NA	NA
Overweight/Obesity (BMI ≥25.0 kg/m2)	41%	31%	30%

In 2019, the female cervical cancer incidence rate in Punjab was 13 per 100,000 women in all ages. This was less than the rate of 14.75 in 1990. The female cervical cancer mortality rate was 7.14 per 100,000 women of all ages in 2019. This was lower than the rate of 9.34 in 1990.

=== Reproductive health ===
The table below shows the current use of family planning methods by currently married women between the age of 15 and 49 years, in Punjab.

Family planning methods used by women between the ages of 15 and 49 years, in Punjab
Method	Total (2019–21)	Urban (2019–21)	Rural (2019–21)	Total (2015–16)
Female sterilization	22.8%	18.0%	25.6%	37.5%
Male sterilization	0.5%	0.5%	0.4%	0.6%
IUD/PPIUD	3.1%	2.8%	3.2%	6.8%
Pill	1.5%	1.1%	1.7%	2.5%
Condom	22.2%	26.6%	19.7%	18.9%
Injectables	0.1%	0.1%	0.1%	0.1%
Any modern method	50.5%	49.4%	51.1%	66.3%
Any method	66.6%	68.4%	65.4%	75.8%
Total unmet need	9.9%	8.8%	10.5%	6.2%
Unmet need for spacing	3.7%	3.3%	3.9%	2.4%

The table below compares the reproductive health statistics women between the ages of 15 and 45 years in Punjab at the national level.

Comparison of reproductive health statistics of women between the ages of 15 and 45 years in Punjab at national level
Indicators	Punjab (2015–16)	India (2015–16)
Total Fertility Rate (TFR)	1.6	2.2
Any Method Contraception Rate (CPR)	75.8%	53.5%
Modern Contraception Rate (mCPR)	66.3%	47.8%
Total Unmet Need	6.2%	12.9%
20-24 year olds who were married before the age of 18 years	7.6%	26.8%
15–19 years olds who were already mothers or pregnant	2.6%	7.9%

== Caste ==
As per National Family Health Survey (NFHS-4, 2015–16), the infant mortality rate was 40 per 1000 live births before the age of one year for scheduled castes, compared to 29 per 1000 births for the state as a whole. The infant mortality rate for other backward castes (OBC) was 21 per 1000 live births and 22 per 1000 for those who are not from SC and OBC classes.

Although the prevalence of anaemia (low levels of haemoglobin in the blood) has been found quite high among all population groups in Punjab, it was still higher among the SC population than other groups. For the women between the ages of 15 and 49 years, the prevalence of anaemia among SC women was 56.9%, compared to 53.5% for the state as a whole. Among the children between the ages of 6 and 59 months, the rate of anaemia for SC children was 60%, compared to 56.9% for the state as a whole.

The table below compares the health status of Scheduled Caste population of Punjab, according to NFHS-3.

Health status of Scheduled Caste (SC) population of Punjab (NFHS-3)
Indicators	SC	Total
Infant Mortality Rate	46	44
Child Mortality Rate	16	7
Anaemic (child)	73.80%	66.40%
Anaemic (women)	42.60%	38.00%

The table below shows the early childhood mortality rates in Punjab by caste, according to NFHS-4 (2015–16).

Early childhood mortality rate in Punjab by caste, according to NFHS-4 (2015–16)
Background Characteristics	SC	OBC	Others	Total
Neonatal Mortality	27.0	16.9	17.1	21.2
Post-neonatal Mortality	12.7	3.6	5.2	8.0
Infant Mortality	39.6	20.5	22.4	29.2
Child Mortality	6.5	3.3	1.9	4.1
Under five Mortality	45.9	23.7	24.2	33.2

== Obesity ==
According to the National Family Health Survey 2020–21, the percentage of males in the age group of 15–49 who were obese or overweight was 32.2% in 2020–21, which an increase from the 27.8% in 2015–16. For women in the same age group, the number in 2020–21 was 40.8% which was an increase from 31.3% in 2015–16. Moreover, according to the same report, 63.1% of the men and 72.8% of the women have high risk waist-to-hip ratio, as of 2020–21.

The table below shows the overweight/obesity rate of men, women and children in Punjab.

Overweight/Obesity rate of Punjab
Age	Group	2019–21	2015–16	2005–06
0–59 months	Children (z score > 2SD)	4%	2%	2%
15–49 years	Men (BMI ≥25.0 kg/m2)	41%	31%	30%
15–49 years	Women (BMI ≥25.0 kg/m2)	32%	28%	22%

During the COVID-19 pandemic, it was asserted that the high death rate of covid patients in Punjab is because of the prevalence of Obesity and other diseases associated with it, like hypertension and diabetes, in the state.

As of December 2023, there were 3,473 recorded gyms in Punjab. Ludhiana was the city with most number of recorded gyms in Punjab at 449.

== Diseases ==
As of 2022, hypertension was the most prevalent non-communicable disease in Punjab, followed by diabetes and cancer. High trans-fat consumption is considered to be the main cause of heart diseases in Punjab. Out of the total medically certified deaths in 2020, 36.2% were due to diseases of circulatory system, which higher than due to COVID-19.

The burning of crop stubble by farmers, after harvesting, has been shown to be a major cause of many respiratory diseases in Punjab. As of October 2013, there were around 30 lakh arthritis patients in Punjab. Of which, around 5 lakh were at an advanced state, which required surgery. The main factors contributing to the growth of arthritis in Punjab were obesity and sedentary lifestyle. Higher levels of stress and modern lifestyle were the main reasons for the increase in arthritis among young people.

The tuberculosis (TB) rate in Punjab came down from 196 per lakh population in 2019 to 163 in 2021, which was a decline of 17%. Only Sri Muktsar Sahib district witnessed a growth of 4.26%, from an incident rate of 141 to 147 per lakh population.

Punjab has witnessed an overall decline in the number of malaria cases from 2010 onwards, when the total number of cases were 3,476. In 2017, there were 796 cases of malaria which was slightly higher than the 596 cases in 2015. As of 2017, the top three districts with the most number of malaria cases were Hoshiarpur at 153, Mansa at 152 and SAS Nagar at 128.

=== Cancer ===
Punjab recorded 38,636 cases of cancer in 2020. This number had been gradually rising since the previous few years. It was 37,744 in 2019 and 36,888 in 2018. By 2024, the number of cancer patients had risen to 42,288, which was a 7% increase from 39,521 in 2021. The numbers increased steadily from 40,435 in 2022 to 41,337 in 2023.

In February 2013, there were 90 cancer patients for every 100,000 people in Punjab, which was higher than the national average of 80. In that year, Muktsar district had the highest cancer rate among all district, at 136 per 100,000. Muktsar was closely followed by Mansa, Bathinda and Firozpur districts. Taran Taran district had the lowest rate at 41 per 100,000 people.

In April 2024, Punjab health department decided to formulate standard treatment guidelines (STGs) for cancer care services, to control rising cancer cases. It includes standard treatment protocols that will help doctors and patients to make informed decisions about suitable healthcare for specific clinical condition. Preventative healthcare in the form of lifestyle modifications, vaccination programmes and public health initiatives was stressed.

The table below shows the number of cases and estimated mortality of Breast cancer in Punjab.

Number of cases and estimated mortality of Breast cancer in Punjab
Year	Numbers	Estimated Mortality
2023	6,667	2,480
2022	6,507	2,421
2021	6,347	2,361
2020	6,192	2,303
2019	6,037	2,246

=== HIV/AIDS ===
As of 2017, there were 40,600 estimated adult cases of HIV infection (AIDS) in Punjab, which comprised 0.18% of the population. As of July 2019, Amritsar district have the highest number of HIV positive cases at 16,619.

The table below shows the number of HIV positive cases in Punjab by district.

Number of HIV positive cases in Punjab
District	Percent	HIV Positive	Total Tested
Amritsar	1.94%	16,619	855,948
Barnala	0.58%	812	139,825
Bathinda	0.93%	3,286	353,880
Faridkot	1.61%	2,812	174,640
Fatehgarh Sahib	0.61%	823	134,783
Fazilka	0.56%	699	125,381
Firozpur	1.42%	2,981	210,206
Gurdaspur	0.85%	3,267	383,963
Hoshiarpur	0.73%	2,760	377,576
Jalandhar	1.67%	7,861	471,435
Kapurthala	0.98%	2,212	225,975
Ludhiana	0.93%	8,949	963,831
Mansa	0.54%	990	184,567
Moga	1.31%	2,367	180,402
Mohali	0.34%	1,041	301,823
Muktsar	0.56%	926	164,861
Nawanshahr	1.11%	1,331	119,750
Pathankot	0.82%	1,976	242,328
Patiala	1.43%	7,769	541,448
Rupnagar	0.57%	1,571	273,490
Sangrur	0.54%	1,857	342,723
Tarn Taran	1.40%	3,060	218,971
State Total	1.09%	75,969	6,987,806

== Differently abled ==
According to the 2011 census, there were 654,043 differently abled persons in Punjab, which comprised 2.35% of the population. Out of these, 3,76,087 people have been provided with the 'disability' certificate. During 2016–2017, a total of 57,713 'disability' certificates were issued.

The table below shows the percentage of disabled people in rural and urban areas of Punjab.

Disabled persons in Rural and Urban areas of Punjab
Residence	Male	Female
Urban	3.1%	2.3%
Rural	3.1%	3.1%

Under the Deendayal Disabled Rehabilitation Scheme, grant-in-aid is provided to the volunteer organizations working for the welfare of the disabled people. The aid is given to the NGOs that work for rehabilitation of disabled persons, including providing them education, artificial limbs, etc.

Under the Assistance to disable persons for purchase of fitting of Aid Appliances (ADIP Scheme), good quality prosthetics and assistive devices are provided to the disabled persons with the help through voluntary organizations. Under this scheme, prosthetic devices are provided for free to the low income persons, who suffer from more than 40% disability. Ministry of Social Justice and Empowerment, provides a grant-in-aid for a cochlear implant for the children from lower income households.

There are 3 vocational training rehabilitation centers and one workshop in Punjab, where disabled persons between the ages of 18 and 40 years are given training in different types of trades like tailoring, cutting, embroidery, typing/stenography, etc. to make them economically self-reliant. The rehabilitation centers are located in Ludhiana, Bathinda and Hoshiarpur and the workshop in Shimlapuri in Ludhiana district.

The disabled persons with more than 40% disability can travel for free or with concession in state buses. For a blind person, travel is free within the state on state buses. For disabled persons other than blind, there is 50% concession within the state in these buses.

== Drug use ==
According to the National Family Health Survey 2020–21, the percentage of people in Punjab above the age of 15 who consume alcohol was 22.8% for men and 0.3% for women. The rate of tobacco usage in the same age group was 12.9% for men and 0.4% for women. A study conducted by PGI Chandigarh revealed that, as of March 2022, around 1.7 lakh people consume opioids in Punjab.

According to the National Crime Record Bureau (NCRB), Punjab recorded the highest number of drug overdose deaths among all the states of the country in 2022, at 144 deaths. In the same year Punjab saw the third highest number of deaths due the consumption of illicit liquor, at 90 deaths.

== Mental health ==
According to a survey conducted in four districts of Punjab, in 2016, the current rate of mental morbidity was 13.42%. That means about 1,283,000 people were suffering from a mental illness in Punjab that year. The lifetime prevalence of mental morbidity was 17.94%. The number of people with high suicide risk was 51,600 and people with moderate suicide risk were 28,700.

It is asserted that, as of 2016, only about 20% of people suffering from mental illness had access to treatment. This is attributed to the low number of psychiatrists, which was only 0.45 per lakh people in Punjab. An increase of 20 to 25% was witnessed in the number of mental health cases in Punjab due to COVID-19 pandemic. The lockdown also had long term effects on the mental health of people from medical background, students, teachers or working professionals.

Punjab government runs 4 homes, called SEHYOG (Half Way Home), for persons suffering from mental illnesses from lower-income families. There the inmates are provided with free accommodation, food, health care, recreation and education. The Homes in Amritsar and Kapurthala are only for females and the Homes at Ludhiana are only for males. Each home has a capacity of 40 inmates.

According to the report by National Crime Records Bureau (NCRB), a total of 2,600 suicides were reported in Punjab in 2021, which was lower than the 2,616 in 2020. This was a rate of about 8.1 suicides per 1 lakh population in 2021, which was lower than the national average of 12.

=== Prisons ===
As of 2016, Punjab has the second highest prison suicide rate in India. In 2019, there were 13 such cases, second only to Uttar Pradesh at 20. In 2017 and 2018, Punjab reported maximum cases in the country at 13 and 27 respectively. A study of prison suicides between 2017 and 2019 found that about 42% of the victims died within a month of incarceration and 15% within 48 hours. About 54 percent of the victims were aged between 25 and 35 years. 71% of the victims were first time inmates and 79% were from rural background. Majority of the victims were held for drug smuggling.

In November 2023, Punjab government launched a mental health intervention program in four state jails. It would provide screening, counseling and referral services to the inmates. Counsellors will conduct counselling to improve the mental health of the detainees and prisoners. According to the health and family welfare minister, later this project will also be implemented in other jails.

In October 2022, Punjab became the first state in India to allow conjugal visits to prisoners. According to a senior official, this decision was taken to keep the stress levels of inmates under control and ensure their re-entry into society, and this also fulfil a basic biological need. Under this scheme, prisoners who exhibited good conduct would be allowed to spend two hours in private with their spouses after every two months. Some categories of prisoners are kept out of this program, which includes high–risk prisoners, terrorists, gangsters and those imprisoned for domestic violence, child abuse and sexual crimes. Moreover, both spouses must be free from infectious diseases like HIV, STDs and Tuberculosis, to avail this program.

== Medical facilities ==
The hospitals in Punjab with facilities for cancer treatment are Government Medical College in Amritsar and a tertiary cancer care center at the civil hospital in Fazilka. On February 25, 2024, an AIIMS in Bathinda and a Postgraduate Institute of Medical Education and Research (PGIMER) satellite centre in Sangrur was opened. On the same day, foundation for a PGIMER satellite centre was also laid in Firozpur.

As of February 2023, at least 600 specialist doctors were required at various community health centers in Punjab, but only 151 were available. On 29 March 2024, first institute of Liver and Biliary Sciences was inaugurated in Mohali.

In October 2019, Punjab government and Post Graduate Institute of Medical Education and Research (PGIMER) jointly decided to promote Artificial Intelligence in healthcare in Punjab, to address health related issues. In May 2023, the health department in Punjab decided to use A.I. technology in the treatment of tuberculosis (TB), initially in 10 districts on a pilot basis. It will be used in analysing chest x-ray images and generating reports, which will help in early diagnosis. In April 2023, Parhar hospital in Phagwara became the first hospital in Punjab to get advanced technology for Robot Joint Replacement Surgeries.

As of June 2022, there were 51,689 allopathic doctors registered with the Punjab Medical Council.

The table below shows the district wise number of registered doctors and other registered medical personnel in Punjab, in year 2018. Note:- The ranks of the districts in this table are in the descending order of the number of registered doctors.

District wise number of registered doctors and other medical personnel in Punjab, in year 2018
Sr. No.	District	Doctors	Nurses	Midwives
1	Ludhiana	4,989	10,904	8,121
2	Amritsar	4,141	6,531	4,018
3	Patiala	3,935	3,279	1,963
4	Jalandhar	3,268	5,119	4,081
5	Hoshiarpur	1,640	3,944	2,806
6	Sangrur	1,286	2,567	3,374
7	Gurdaspur	1,058	6,118	6,472
8	Firozpur	1,036	4,459	3,096
9	Bathinda	898	2,104	2,774
10	Rupnagar	864	2,409	2,159
11	Kapurthala	737	2,165	766
12	SAS Nagar	545	2,790	1,788
13	Faridkot	499	2,997	3,037
14	Mansa	325	2,616	3,424
15	Moga	312	3,172	2,084
16	Sri Muktsar Sahib	283	2,648	839
17	SBS Nagar	262	2,516	383
18	Barnala	200	2,037	825
19	Fatehgarh Sahib	198	2,064	306
20	Fazilka	162	460	987
21	Pathankot	145	50	120
22	Tarn Taran	84	3,378	2,370
	Outside State Territory	630	2,855	989
	Punjab	29,772	77,182	56,782

The table below shows the population served per doctor, per nurse and per midwife by districts of Punjab, in the year 2018. Note:- The ranks of the districts in the table are in the ascending order of the population served per doctor.

Population served per doctor, per nurse and per midwife in districts of Punjab, in year 2018
Sr. No.	District	Doctor	Nurse	Midwife
1	Faridkot	499	224	225
2	Patiala	551	161	1,172
3	Amritsar	661	424	689
4	Jalandhar	729	465	5,943
5	Ludhiana	780	357	506
6	Rupnagar	844	302	340
7	Bathinda	898	744	585
8	Hoshiarpur	1,017	423	654
9	Gurdaspur	1,058	284	280
10	Ferozpur	1,083	251	377
11	Kapurthala	1,171	398	1,226
12	Sangrur	1,404	703	558
13	Mansa	2,073	319	2,376
14	SAS Nagar	2,264	442	739
15	SBS Nagar	2,408	250	2,183
16	Barnala	3,212	320	714
17	Fatehgarh Sahib	3,286	315	2,745
18	Moga	3,456	339	318
19	Sri Muktsar Sahib	3,561	380	1,375
20	Pathankot	4,943	14,336	7,389
21	Fazilka	7,089	2,496	1,258
22	Tarn Taran	15,210	378	568
	Punjab	522	1,234	950

The table given below shows the population served per doctor in Punjab, by years.

Population served per doctor in Punjab, by years
Year	Population	Year	Population
2018	522	2000	1,490
2012	1,170	1999	1,485
2010	1,250	1998	1,483
2008	1,225	1997	1,472
2007	1,316	1996	1,499
2006	1,263	1995	1,487
2005	1,388	1994	1,501
2004	1,468	1993	1,608
2003	1,489	1992	1,481
2002	1,324	1991	1,514
2001	1,472	1990	1,589

The table below shows the district wise population served per bed.

Population served per bed in districts of Punjab, in year 2018
Sr. No.	District	Population
1	Faridkot	800
2	Amritsar	822
3	Patiala	941
4	Hoshiarpur	1,051
5	SBS Nagar	1,101
6	Rupnagar	1,103
7	Kapurthala	1,141
8	Fatehgarh Sahib	1,218
9	Barnala	1,262
10	Tarn Taran	1,402
11	Jalandhar	1,411
12	Sri Muktsar Sahib	1,427
13	Gurdaspur	1,437
14	Mansa	1,523
15	Sangrur	1,612
16	Pathankot	1,694
17	Ferozpur	1,700
18	Moga	1,700
19	SAS Nagar	1,704
20	Fazilka	1,709
21	Bathinda	1,927
22	Ludhiana	2,397
	Punjab	1,338

== See also ==
- Health
- COVID-19 pandemic in Punjab, India
- Sports in Punjab, India
- Demographics of Punjab, India
- Education in Punjab (India)
- Disability in India
