= Sports in Punjab =

Various types of sports are played in Punjab. Both Indian Punjab and Pakistani Punjab have separate sports boards to undertake most of the sports activities in their respective regions. Also many many private organizations, universities and schools held their sporting events as well. Punjab youth festival is an annual event in Pakistani Punjab that is very famous in terms of audience participation. Also local boards make sure to have international collaborations when necessary to improve standards in certain sports.

Since Punjab have a huge foreign diaspora so they arrange certain events in other countries as well. Recently rugby is gaining traction in Punjab and Pakistan's first under-16 rugby team has been selected from Faisalabad Punjab to play in the World Rugby under-16 tournament.
