= Tipri dance (Punjab) =

Punjabi stick dance

Tipri is a Punjabi stick dance popular in Patiala (Punjab, India) and Ambala (Haryana).

== Styles ==
According to Randhawa (1960), Tipri is performed by boys and men using small sticks. The participants dance in a circle striking the sticks. In one version, the dancers also hold a rope which is tied at the top end to a pole. Each dancer then weaves the rope with the ropes of the other dancers. The ropes are then untangled whilst the male dancers strike the sticks. Randhawa suggests that the dance is local to Patiala city and is similar to dandiya of Bombay (Mumbai) and tipni of Rajasthan.

Another style of Tipri, according to James (1974), is danced by girls who carry small sticks which are tapped to create a rhythm. No singing is involved in the dance. Dhillon (1998) tells of yet another style of Tipri where dancers carry two sticks. Each dancer strikes his own sticks and then that of the other dancers. The participants move in a circle and perform body actions. However, this form of Tipri is another name for the dance known as dandaas popular in Multan, Bahawalpur and north-western Punjab, Pakistan.

== Bavan Dvadasi ==
Bavan Dvadasi is a festival dedicated to the Hindu God Vamana. The festival is held during the lunar month of Bhadra. Singh writing for the Tribune in 2000 states that "Tipri, a local version of dandia of Gujarat and a characteristic of the Patiala and Ambala districts, is losing popularity. Its performances are now limited to the occasions of Bavan Dvadsi." According to Singh (2000) "Bavan Dvadsi is a local festival celebrated only in the Patiala and Ambala districts. Anywhere else, people are not aware of it. Now, tipri is performed during this festival only." Singh then states that Bavan Dvadsi "is to celebrate the victory of Lord Vishnu, who in the form of a dwarf, had tricked Raja Bali to grant him three wishes, before transforming into a giant to take the Earth, the sky and Bali's life". Tipri competitions are held during the festival. Dancers dance in pairs, striking the sticks and creating a rhythm whilst holding ropes.

== See also ==
- Folk dances of Punjab
