= Shimlapuri =

Shimlapuri is a mixed-use area in Ludhiana city in Punjab, India.

It has small scale industry, and a population of about 400. It is along Sidhwan Canal and includes both residential and industrial buildings.

The relatively small neighborhood has been the scene of several suicides and/or murders between 2016 and 2024, which the Indian media often labels as "died under mysterious circumstances" or similar euphemism for taboo issues.

The area has been described in the Indian media in early 2025 as a "slum" in need of "rehabilitation". According to unofficial media estimates, the neighborhood has "a population of 400," consisting of 50 families with 300 children. Local commissioner Jitendra Jorwal appealed to think of the children, that is to say, "the long-term vision of the project, which aims to secure a brighter future for slum children," and "that this project will serve as a stepping stone to secure a bright future for children in the slum by facilitating their admission into nearby schools after proper educational counseling."

== Miscellaneous data ==
The Postal pin code is 141003.

Place :	Shimlapuri
PIN Code	141003
District :	Ludhiana
Tehsil/ Taluka :	Ludhiana
State :	Punjab
Latitude :	30.8713377
Longitude :	75.8664572

Nearby Places
A.P. Basti
Indl Colony
Janta Nagar
Labour Colony
Millerganj
Shimlapuri

The ward counselors include:

Ward No	Councilors Name and Address 2013–2018
8	Sh. Daljit Singh Grewal Bholla, B-XXX1/14195, Guru Gobind Singh Nagar Tibba Road, Ludhiana. IND.
16	Sh. Radha Krishan H.No.1567/1, St.No.1, Shaheed Baba Deep Nagar, Ludhiana
63	Sh. Jagbir Singh Sokhi 6004, New Shimla Puri, Street No.7, Block-21, Daba Road,
64	Sh. Sat Pal Singh 10192, 120- B, V.P.O Lohara Ludhiana.
67	Sh. Ranjit Singh Ubhi 3619, Street No.4, Chet Singh nagar, Gill Road, Ludhiana
73	Smt. Baby Singh 7171, Mahan Singh Nagar, daba Lohara Road, Ludhiana.
