= Education in Punjab, India =

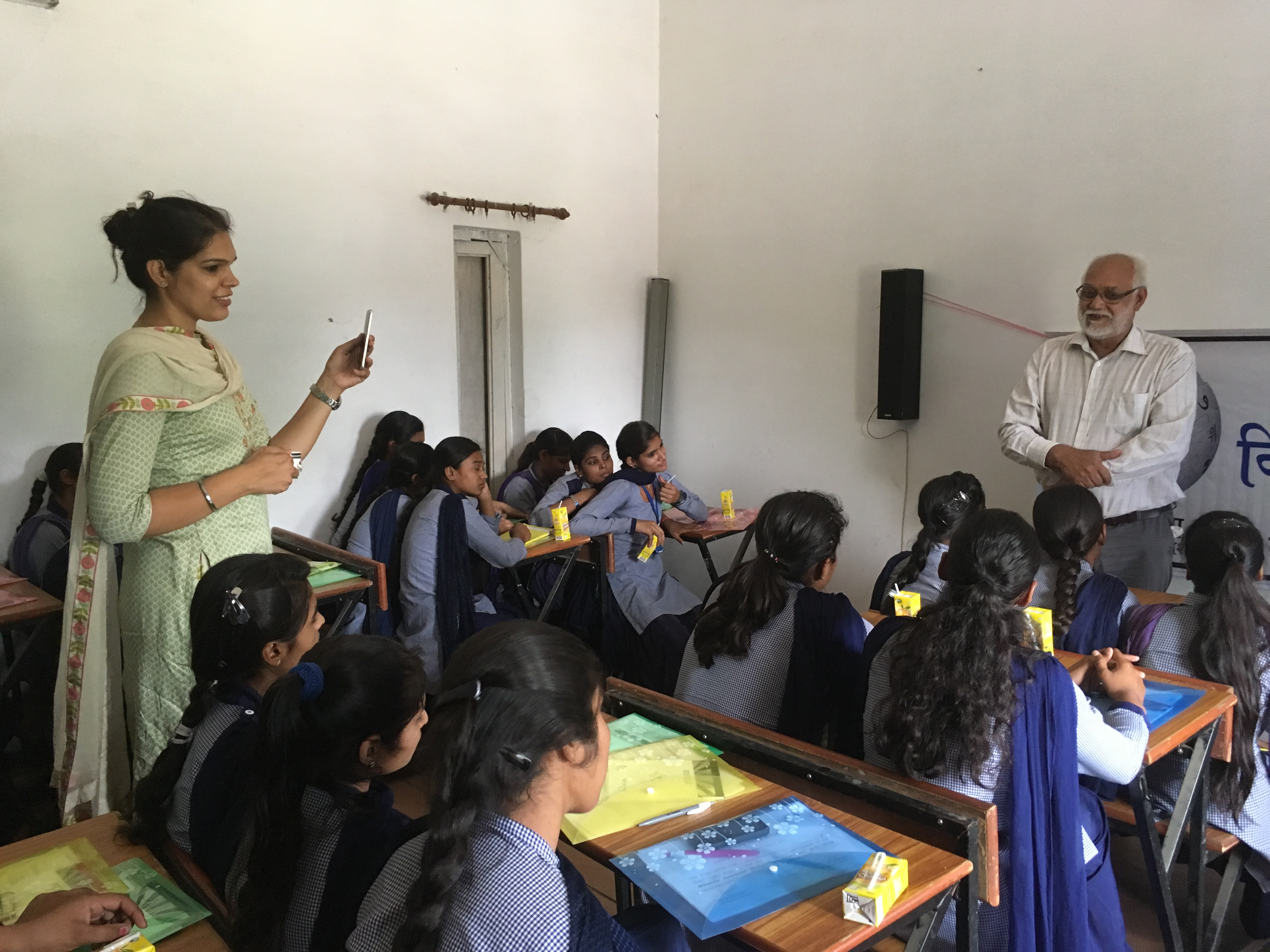
Punjab school classroom

Punjab has a long history of education. Indigenous systems of education were surmounted by Western models after British colonization. Christian missionaries established many educational institutions during the subsequent period. Since independence, new schools and universities have propped-up. There are also many libraries located around the state.

== History ==
=== Sikh era and the indigenous education system ===
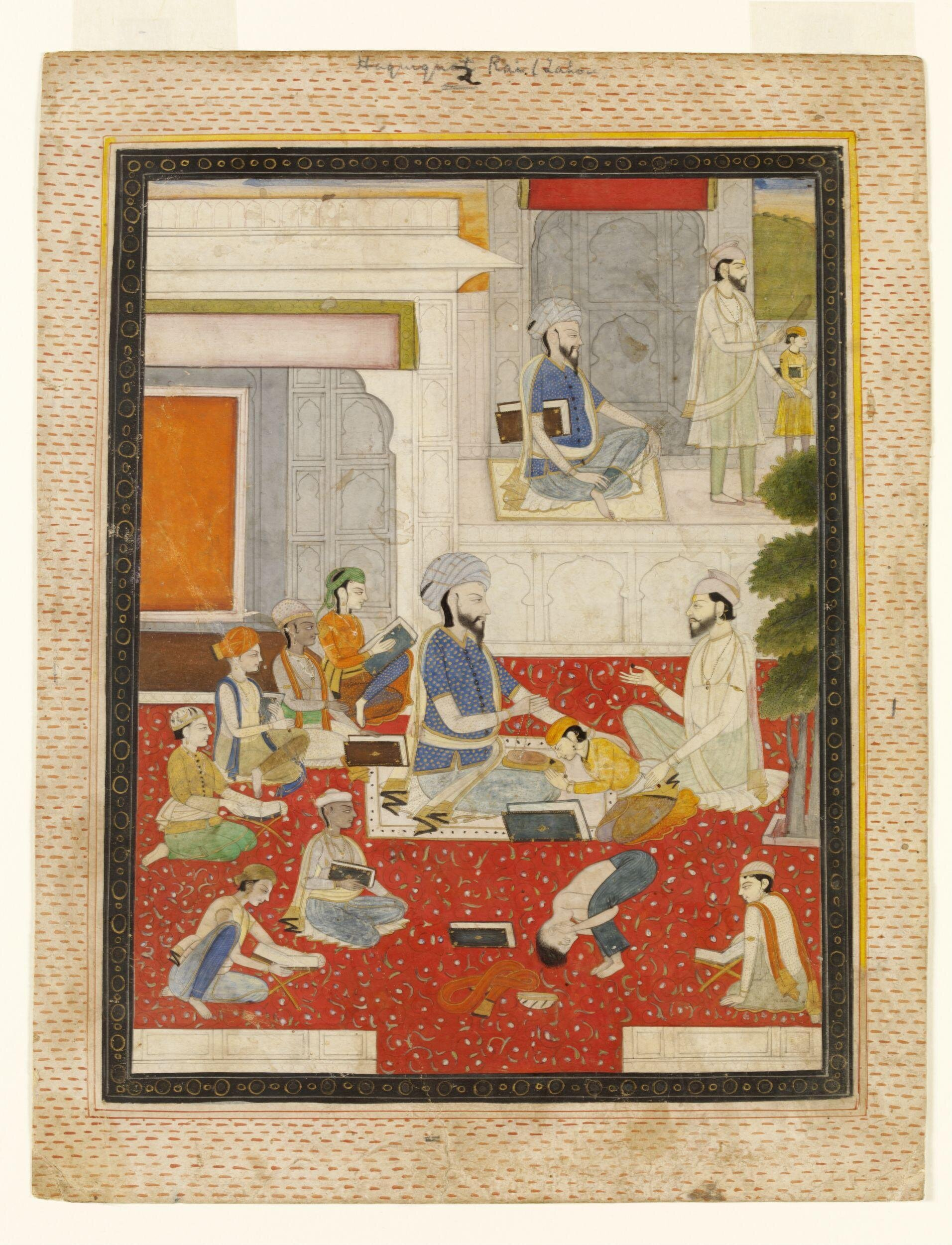
A Sikh guru (teacher) with pupils, Lahore, about 1800–1810

In pre-colonial Punjab during Sikh-rule, the indigenous education system was mostly imparted via educational institutions attached to religious sites or deras operated by Udasis, Nirmalas, Gianis, Bhais, Sants, Babas, and numerous guru-lineages comprising largerly of descendants of the Sikh gurus, which consisted of holy-men, asetics, guruships, and traditional intellectuals. These native schools provided both a religious and secular education, with subjects such as languages, classics, Gurmukhi, Sanskrit, rhetoric, poetry, history, literature, arithematic, astrology, medicine (specifically ayurveda), mythology, theology, meditation, yoga, scripture, memorization, and transcription. Native terms for subjects included Vyakran (grammar), Granth Kavya (poetics), Alankar (rhetoric), Pingal (prosody), Niti (logic), Itihas (history) and Lilavati (an indigenous text). This native education system was praised by G. W. Leitner.

The following texts were studied at such schools:

- Japjī
- Rahirās
- Ārtī-Sohilā
- Siddha Gosț
- Unkār
- Baibar
- Adi Granth
- Hanumān Nātak
- Rāmāyaṇa
- Bhagvad Gītā
- Janam Sākhīs
- Viṣṇu Purāṇa
- Dasvan Aṣṭa Khaṇḍa
- Aśvan Medhā

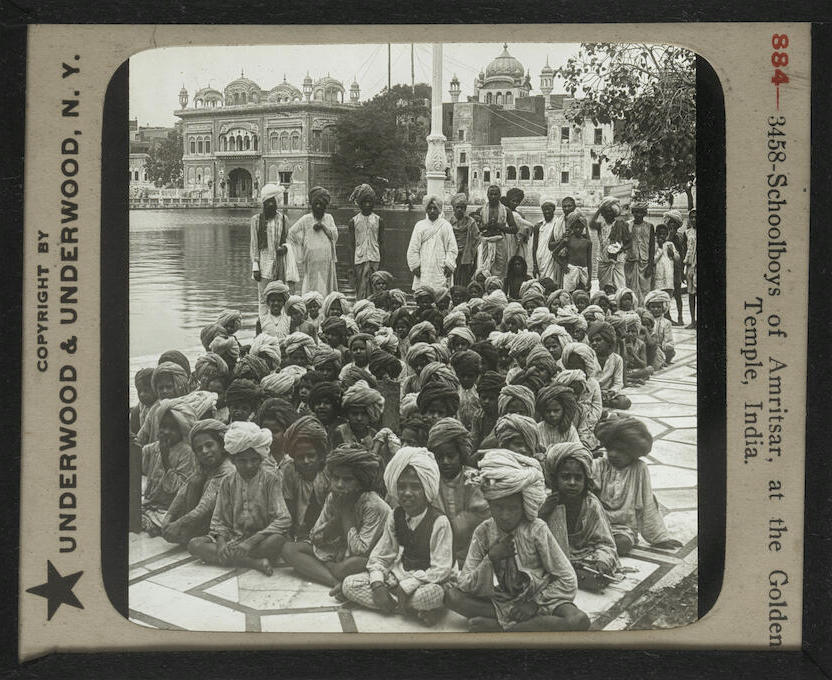
Photograph of school-boys at the Golden Temple of Amritsar, magic-lantern slide, Punjab, circa late-19th or early-20th century

At Gurmukhi schools, often operated by the bhais, a child (both boys and girls went to the same primary school) usually became a pupil at the age of five. They first learnt how to write on the ground and later on a wooden-slab. Then they were taught numerals, simple enumeration, and signs for weights and measures. They were also instructed on both secular and religious texts. Such schools were supported by local rulers and jagirdars. In 1882, there were 829 Gurmukhi schools still operating in Punjab, with their district-wise breakdown being as follows:

Number of Gurmukhi schools and pupils in British Punjab by district (Leitner, 1882)
District	No. of Gurmukhi schools	No. of pupils at these schools
Karnal	1	8
Sirsa	10	55
Ambala	7	66
Ludhiana	97	891
Jalandhar	50	579
Hoshiarpur	36	332
Amritsar	64	1,263
Sialkot	29	394
Gurdaspur	8	98
Multan	11	203
Jhang	55	770
Muzaffargarh	9	73
Montgomery	48	537
Lahore	43	571
Gujranwala	35	81
Firozpur	35	311
Rawalpindi	137	2,894
Shahpur	63	1,249
Jhelum	27	646
Gujrat	54	879
Kohat	3	41
Hazara	15	163
Dera Ghazi Khan	5	32
Bannu	14	221
Dera Ismail Khan	17	192
Total	829	12,254

If a student wanted to progress from studentship to fellowship (becoming a bhai), it was compulsory for them to study the Guru Granth Sahib, the Dasam Granth, Gurmukhi grammar, Pingal (Gurmukhi prosody), Itihas (history), arithematic, and Sanskrit elements. To progress further, education was required in the Gurmukhi adaptations and translations of Niaya, Vedanta, and Pratigant. The highest level in the education system was that of a Giani or I'rfan, who could explain theology and philosophy in the local vernacular as a preacher to the masses.

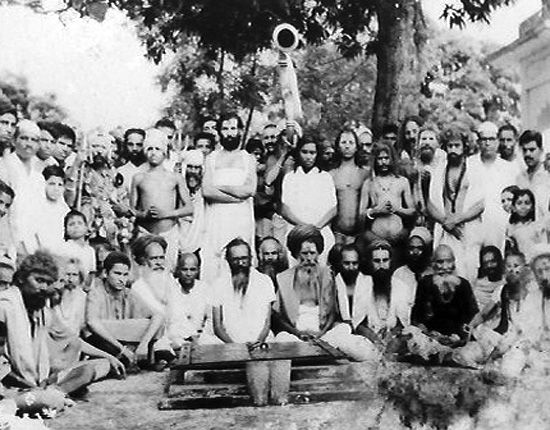
Photograph of Udasi sadhus at Takht Sri Hazur Sahib, Nanded, Deccan, circa late 19th century

Sulakhan Singh had highlighted that Udasi institutions and sites played a large role in the education of the population during the Sikh-era in the 18th and 19th centuries. Udasi schools were attached to gurdwaras, akharas, dharamshalas, maths, deras, bungas, and temples, being patronized by the ruling administrations in the form of madad-i ma'ash and dharmarth revenue-free land-grants. Whilst the education provided was relatively rudimentary and basic, there were a variety of subjects taught, such as writing, poetry, grammar, linguistics, theology, musicology, morality, sciences, mathematics, physiology, and medicine. G. W. Leitner notes that Udasi institutions were providing education in a dozen districts of Punjab. After colonization, the indigenous Udasi schooling system declined and was surmounted by the newly introduced Western modes of education.

During the rule of Maharaja Ranjit Singh, funding was given by the royal court to the schools affiliated to the various religious communities. Schools for girls were also opened in many places. Near the end of his rule in the 1830s, Ranjit Singh also started to encourage the learning of English, for which a Christian teacher was hired in a school in Lahore.

=== Colonial period and the introduction of the Western education system ===
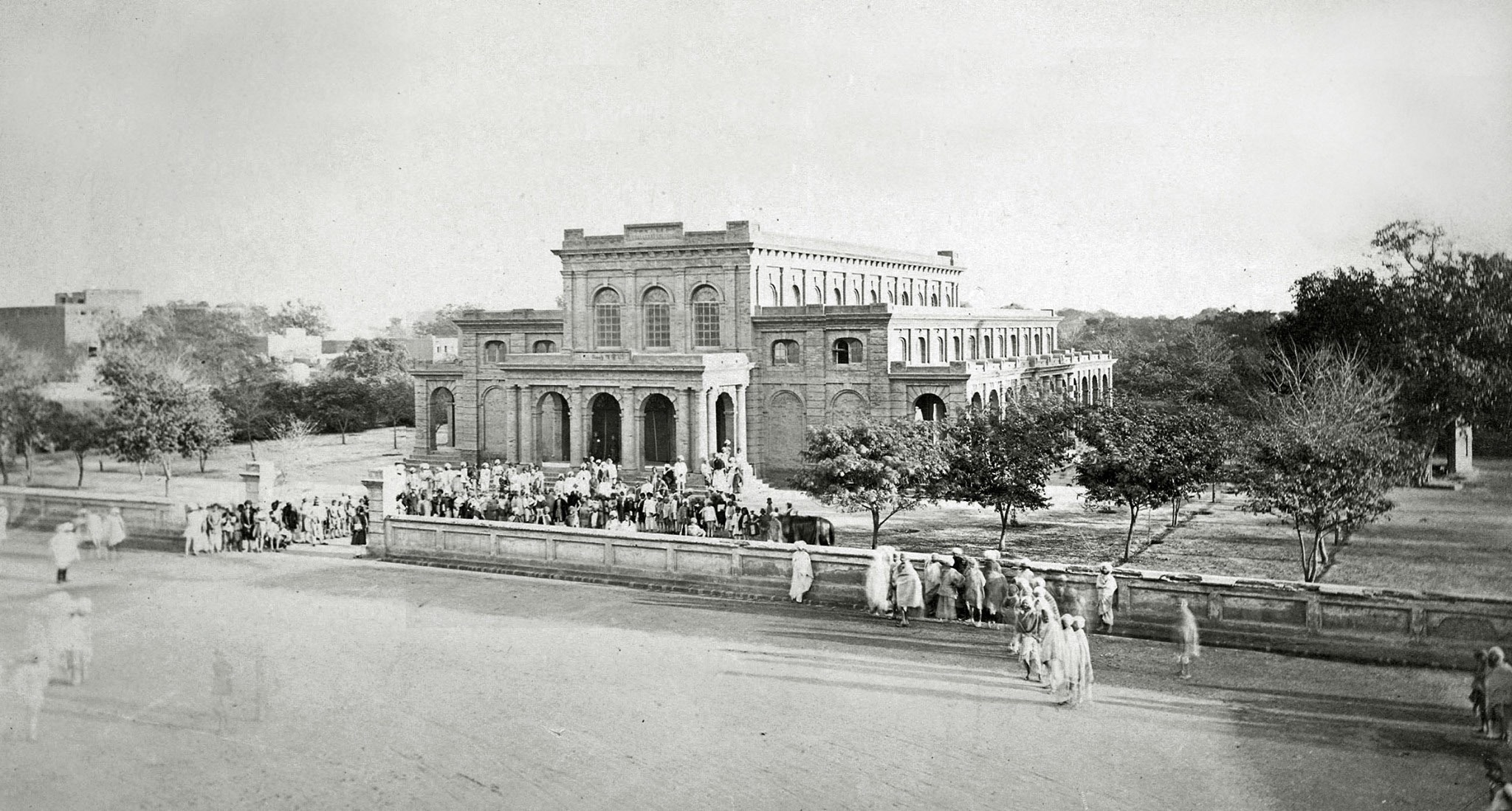
Photograph of a district (zilla) government upper-class school in Amritsar, ca.1870

The first printing press in Punjab using Gurmukhi script was established in Ludhiana in 1835 by a Christian mission. The first Punjabi dictionary was published in 1854 by Reverend J. Newton. Missionary schools were established in Jalandhar (1848), Ludhiana (1851) and Amritsar (1853). Following the example of the missionaries government soon started establishing primary schools in cities and large towns and the district officers opened and started maintaining schools with local funds in minor areas. The subjects taught in these schools included English, Geometry, Geography and Persian, Arabic and Urdu languages. In 1854, the Punjab education department was instituted with a policy to provide secular education in all government managed institutions. Privately run institutions would only receive grants-in-aid in return for providing secular instruction. By 1864 this had resulted in a situation whereby all grants-in-aid to higher education schools and colleges were received by institutions under European management, and no indigenous owned schools received government help. In the early 1860s, a number of educational colleges were established, including Lawrence College, Murree, King Edward Medical University, Government College, Lahore, Glancy Medical College and Forman Christian College. Starting from late 1877, Punjabi became one of the languages in which students could be examined at Punjab University. The 1868 census claimed that only around 380,000 people (around 2% of the population, mostly men) were literate in Punjab.

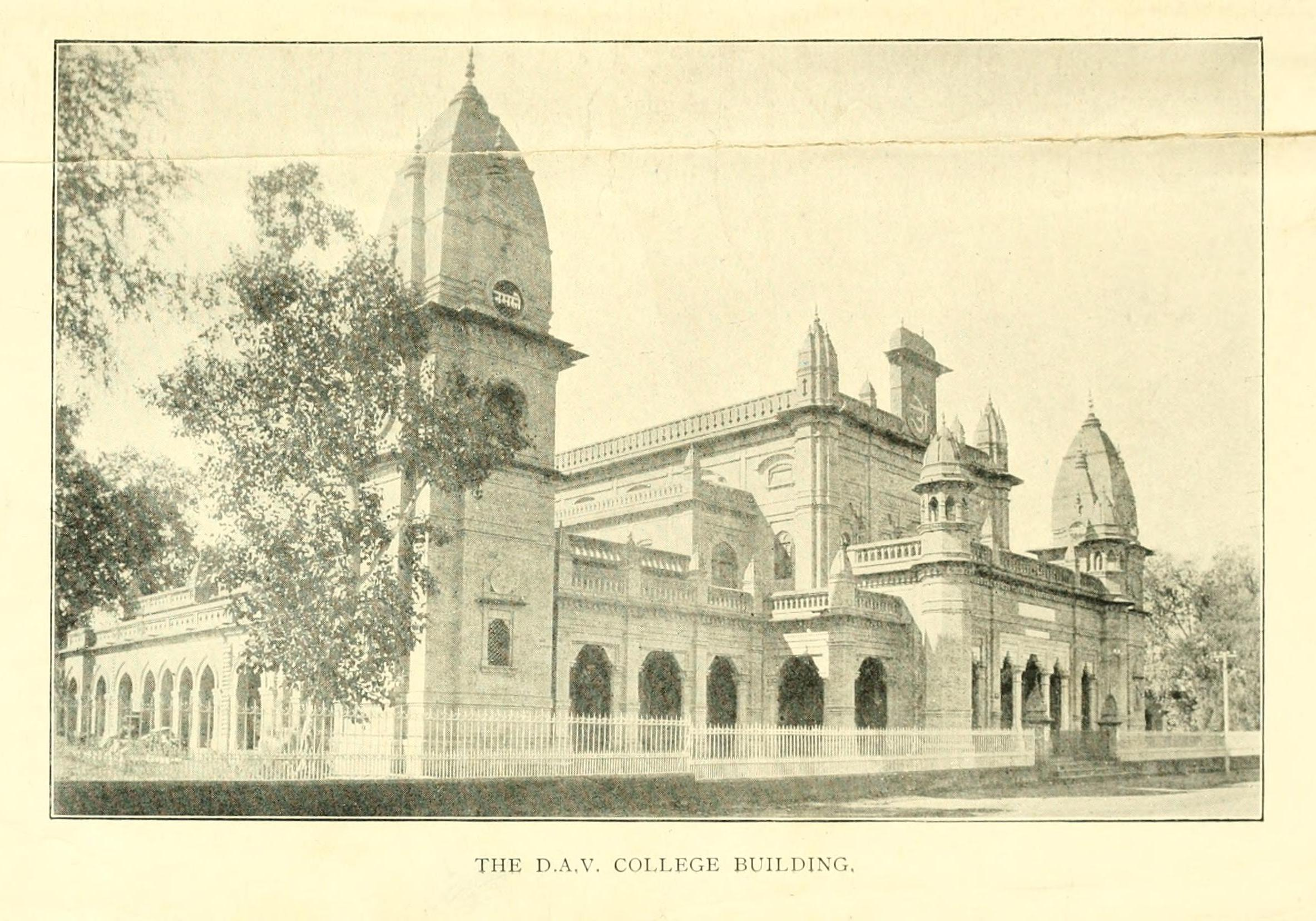
Dayanand Anglo-Vedic Schools System (D.A.V.) in Lahore, published in 'The Arya Samaj; An Account of its Origin, Doctrines, and Activities, with a Biographical Sketch of the Founder' (1915) by Lala Lajpat Rai.

In 1882, Gottlieb Wilhelm Leitner published a damning report on the state of education in the Punjab. He lamented the failure to reconcile government run schools with traditional indigenous schools, and noted a steady decline in the number of schools across the province since annexation. He noted in particular how Punjabi Muslim's avoided government run schools due to the lack of religious subjects taught in them, observing how at least 120,000 Punjabis attended schools unsupported by the state and describing it as 'a protest by the people against our system of education.' Leitner had long advocated the benefits of oriental scholarship, and the fusion of government education with religious instruction. In January 1865 he had established the Anjuman-i-Punjab, a subscription based association aimed at using a European style of learning to promote useful knowledge, whilst also reviving traditional scholarship in Arabic, Persian and Sanskrit. In 1884, a reorganisation of the Punjab education system occurred, introducing measures tending towards decentralisation of control over education and the promotion of an indigenous education agency. As a consequence several new institutions were encouraged in the province. The Arya Samaj opened a college in Lahore in 1886, the Sikhs opened the Khalsa College whilst the Anjuman-i-Himayat-i-Islam stepped in to organise Muslim education. In 1886, the Punjab Chiefs' College, later renamed Aitchison College, was opened to further the education of the elite classes. Khalsa College was founded in 1892 in Amritsar.

=== Post-independence ===
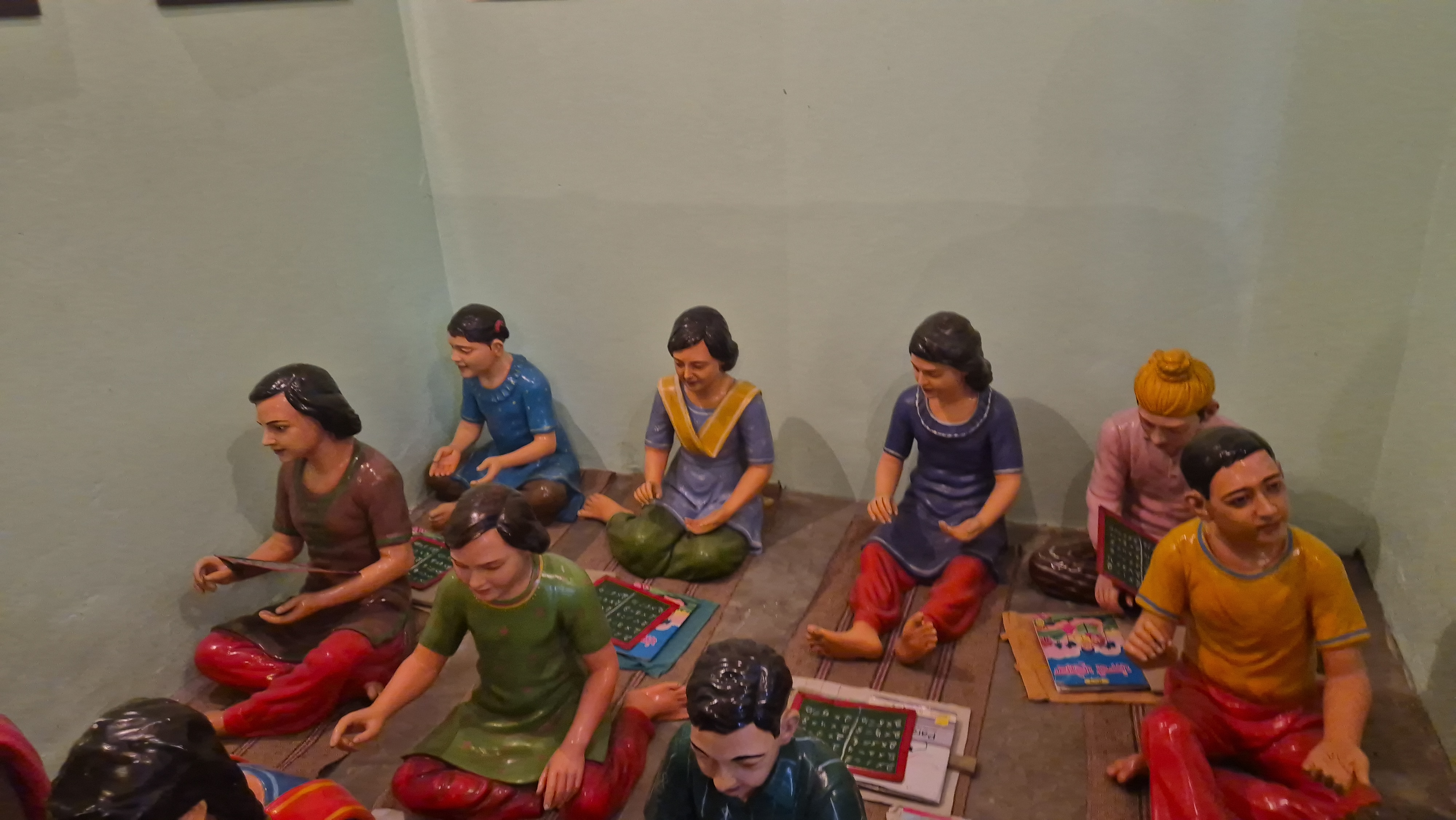
A display from Mera Pind, Punjab showcasing Jamaat, a class in traditional Punjabi schools

In 1962, Punjab Agricultural University was established in Ludhiana and Punjabi University in Patiala. On November 24, 1969, Guru Nanak Dev University was established in Amritsar.

==== 21st century ====
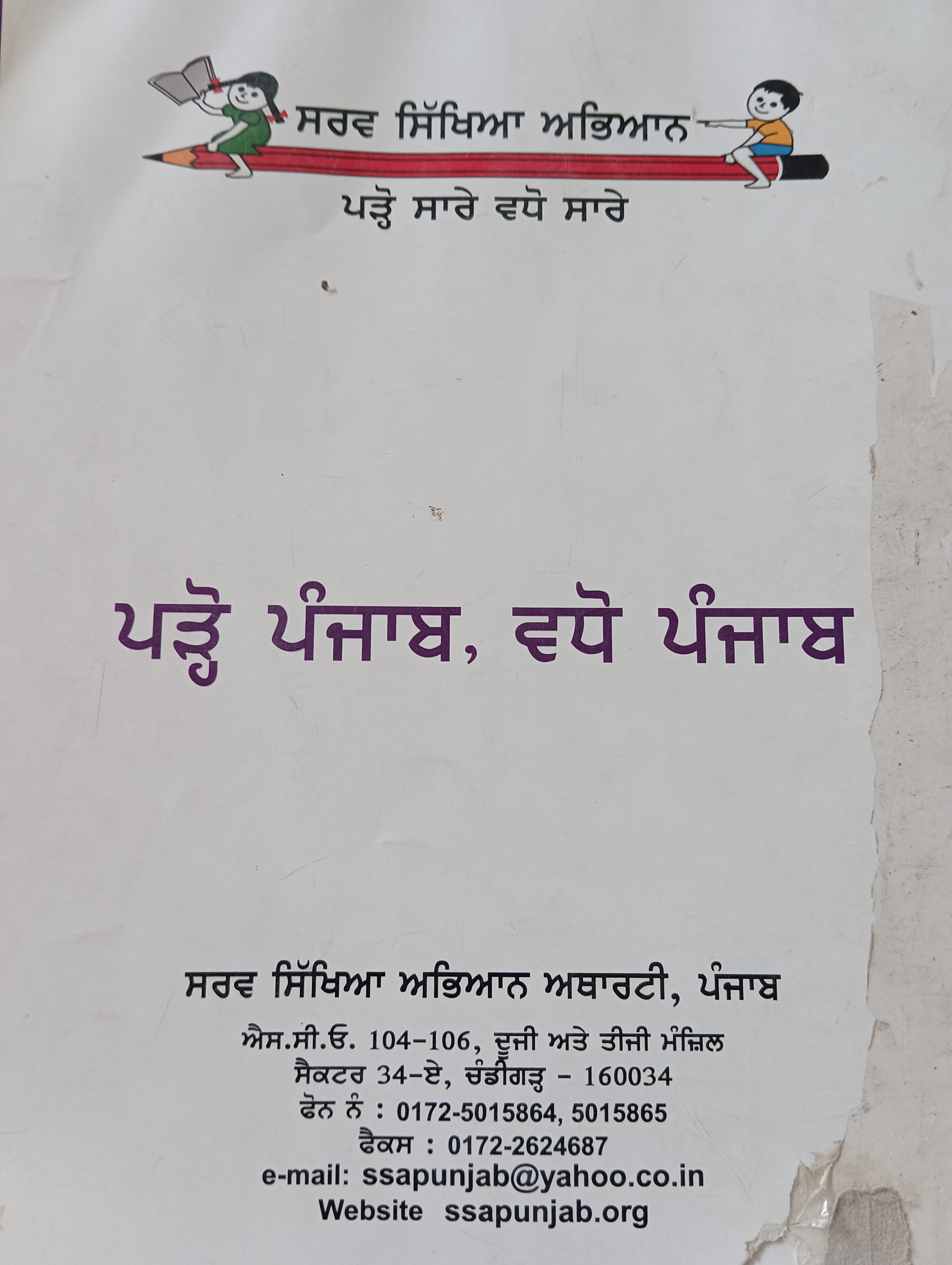
A primary school book published under Sarva Shiksha Abhiyan Punjab

Sarva Shiksha Abhiyan was started in 2000s by the government of India to provide free and compulsory education to the children from 6 to 14 years of age.

As per the National Achievement Survey (NAS) 2021 report, Punjab's education system scored higher than the Indian average, with it topping in 11 subjects nation-wide. The same year, The Punjab School Education Board (Amendment) Bill, 2021 was brought-up. In August 2024, Punjab government announced that it is planning to start a new project called "Schools of happiness". According to the sources, it aims to "create a nurturing and joyful learning environment in the schools by upgrading infrastructure, enhancing facilities, and integrating a holistic approach to education".

In 2026, Punjab's education system was highly-ranked in India, surpassing Kerala, as per a NITI Aayog report. As per the Education Quality Report, Punjab successfully bridged the gap between urban and rural areas and supported girls' education.

== Primary and secondary education ==
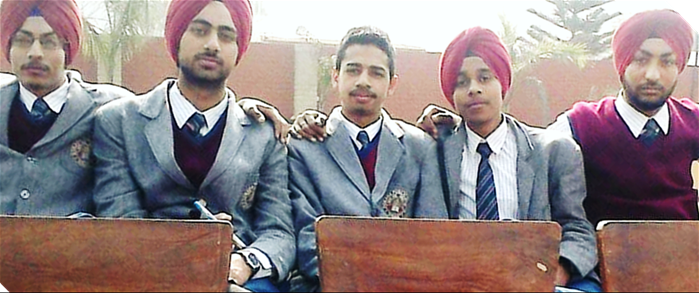
Senior School students in Punjab

The Indian government lays emphasis on the primary education up to the age of fourteen years, referred to as elementary education in India. It has been a fundamental right enlisted in the constitution of the country under Article 21-A up till the age of 14 years. The Indian government has banned child labour and guarantees free and compulsory education up to age 14 under Article 21-A and the Right of Children to Free and Compulsory Education Act, 2009. Recent state data replace the older national statistic above. As per the Unified District Information System for Education Plus (UDISE+) 2024–25, Punjab has 27,281 recognised schools: 19,243 government schools (≈70.6%), 7,589 private unaided schools (≈27.8%), and 437 government-aided schools. UDISE+ also reports 26.69 lakh students enrolled in government schools and 30.63 lakh in private unaided schools for 2024–25, indicating a shift toward higher private-school enrolment in the state.

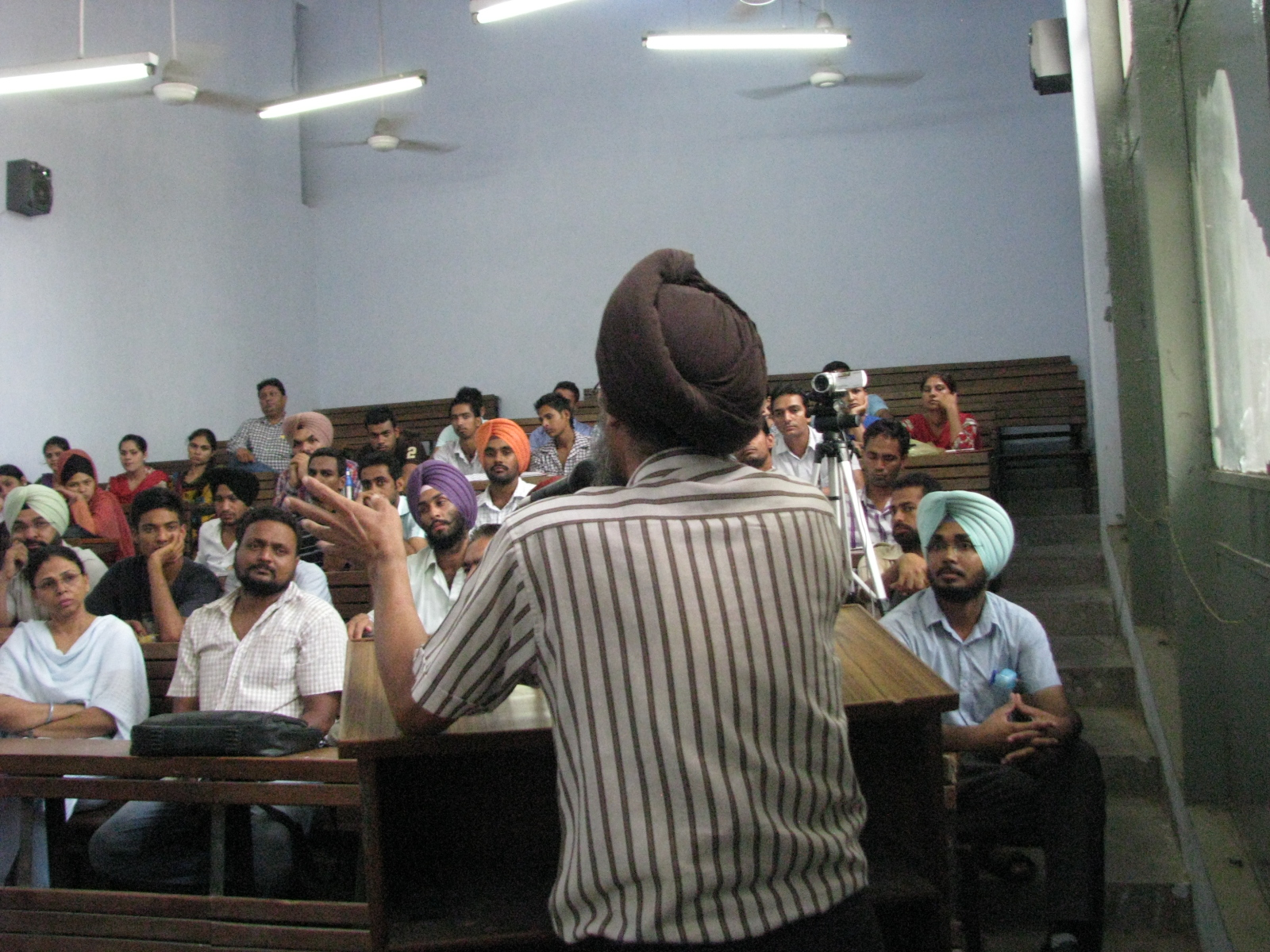
School workshop

However, due to a shortage of resources and lack of political will, this system suffers from massive gaps including high pupil to teacher ratios, shortage of infrastructure and poor levels of teacher training. Nationwide teacher numbers have changed substantially since 2011. According to UDISE+ 2024-25, the total number of teachers in India exceeded 1,01,22,420 in 2024-25, an increase from about 98.1 lakh the previous year. At the state level, UDISE+ 2024-25 reports 2,73,130 teachers in Punjab (a marginal change from 2,73,092 in 2023-24) giving the state an overall pupil–teacher ratio of 22. Education has also been made free for children for 6 to 14 years of age or up to class VIII under the Right of Children to Free and Compulsory Education Act 2009.

There have been several efforts to enhance quality made by the government. The District Education Revitalization Programme (DERP) was launched in 1994 with an aim to universalize primary education in India by reforming and vitalizing the existing primary education system. 85% of the DERP was funded by the central government and the remaining 15 percent was funded by the states. The DERP, which had opened 160000 new schools including 84000 alternative education schools delivering alternative education to approximately 3.5 million children, was also supported by UNICEF and other international programmes.

This primary education scheme has also shown a high Gross Enrollment Ratio of 93–95% for the last three years in some states. Significant improvement in staffing and enrollment of girls has also been made as a part of this scheme. The current scheme for universalization of Education for All is the Sarva Shiksha Abhiyan which is one of the largest education initiatives in the world. Enrollment has been enhanced, but the levels of quality remain low.

The table below shows the district level teacher to pupil ratio from class 1 to 5 in Punjab, as of 2017.

District-wise Teacher-Pupil Ratio of Class 1 to 5 in 2017 (As of 30 September)
District	Ratio
Hoshiarpur	15
Rupnagar	16
Fatehgarh Sahib	16
SAS Nagar	17
SBS Nagar	18
Gurdaspur	18
Pathankot	19
Kapurthala	20
Faridkot	20
Sri Muktsar Sahib	20
Jalandhar	21
Sangrur	21
Patiala	22
Ludhiana	24
Bathinda	24
Barnala	26
Fazilka	27
Amritsar	30
Ferozpur	30
Mansa	30
Moga	31
Taran taran	46

== Secondary education ==
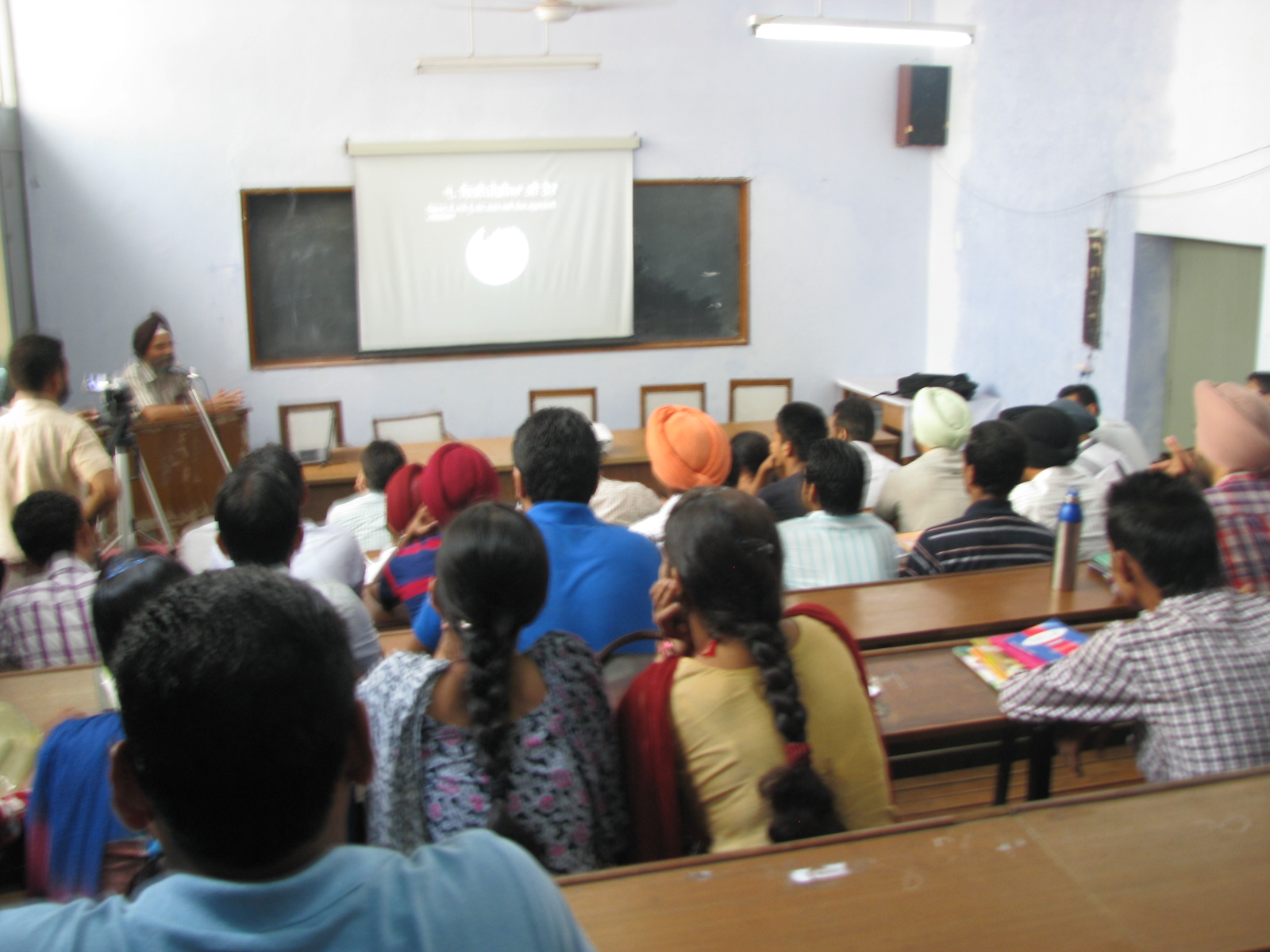
Classroom in Punjab

The National Policy on Education (NPE), 1986, has provided for environment awareness, science and technology education, and introduction of traditional elements such as Yoga into the Indian secondary school system. Secondary education covers children aged approximately 14 to 18. In Punjab, the 2024-25 UDISE+ state profile shows the following distribution of enrolled students by level (NEP-aligned): Foundational / primary 52%, Upper primary 22%, Secondary 13%, and Higher secondary 12.2%. These figures reflect the NEP 5+3+3+4 restructuring and should be used instead of the older 2001 Census-era totals for descriptive context.

A significant feature of India's secondary school system is the emphasis on inclusion of the disadvantaged sections of the society. Professionals from established institutes are often called to support in vocational training. Another feature of India's secondary school system is its emphasis on profession based vocational training to help students attain skills for finding a vocation of his/her choosing. A significant new feature has been the extension of SSA to secondary education in the form of the Rashtriya Madhyamik Shiksha Abhiyan.

A special Integrated Education for Disabled Children (IEDC) programme was started in 1974 with a focus on primary education. but which was converted into Inclusive Education at Secondary Stage Another notable special programme, the Kendriya Vidyalaya project, was started for the employees of the central government of India, who are distributed throughout the country. The government started the Kendriya Vidyalaya project in 1965 to provide uniform education in institutions following the same syllabus at the same pace regardless of the location to which the employee's family has been transferred.

=== Notable schools ===
- The British Co-Ed High School
- Dasmesh Public School, Faridkot
- Our Lady Of Fatima Convent Secondary School, Paliata
- Sainik School, Kapurthala

== Tertiary education ==
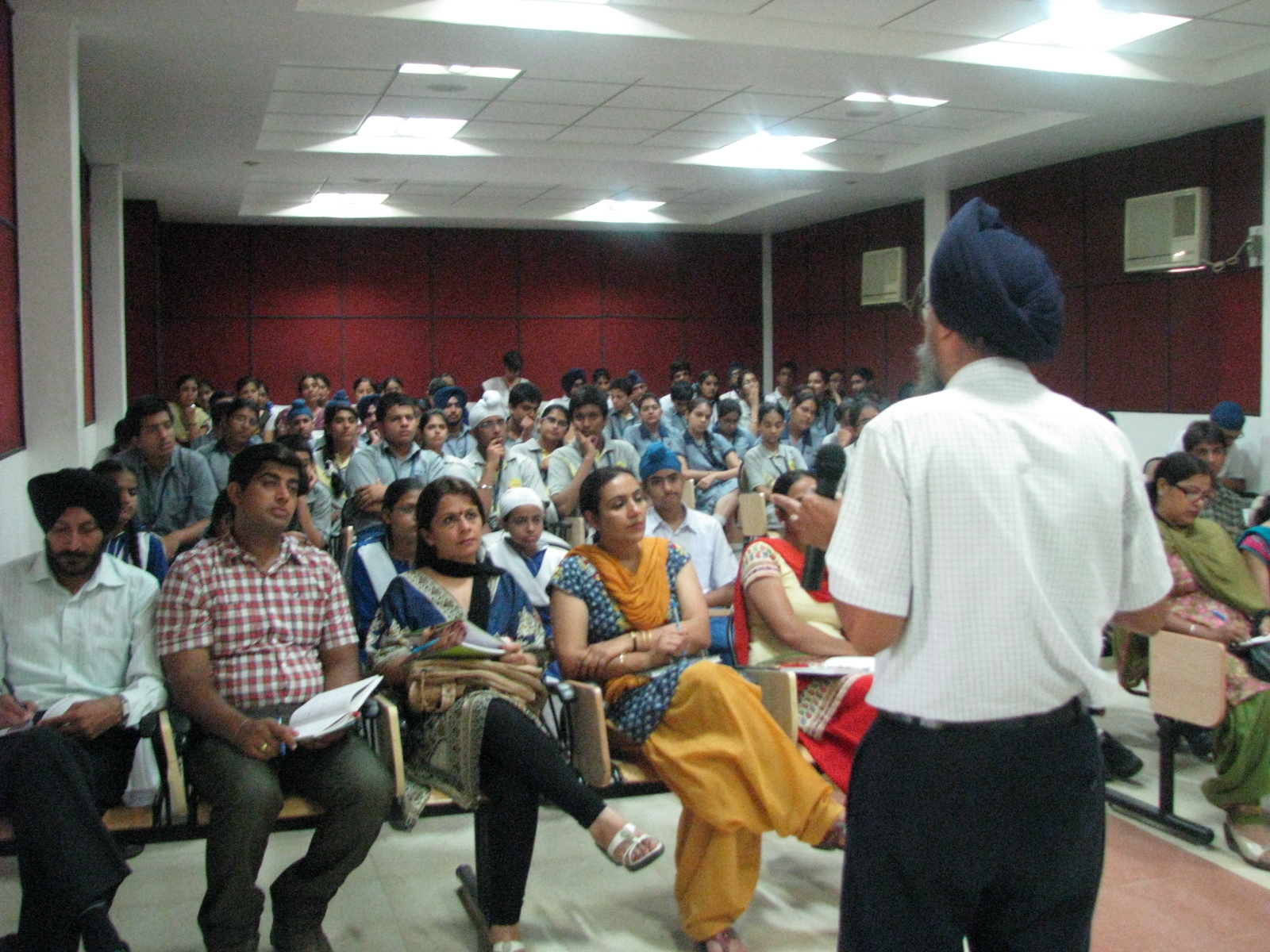
An educational seminar

Punjab is served by many public institutes of higher education (listed below). All the major arts, humanities, science, engineering, law, medicine, veterinary science, and business courses are offered, leading to first degrees as well as postgraduate awards. Advanced research is conducted in all major areas of excellence. Punjab Agricultural University is one of the world's leading authorities in agriculture. It was instrumental and played vital role in Punjab's Green Revolution in the 1960s-70s.

=== Universities ===
==== Central ====
- Central University of Punjab, Bathinda

==== State ====
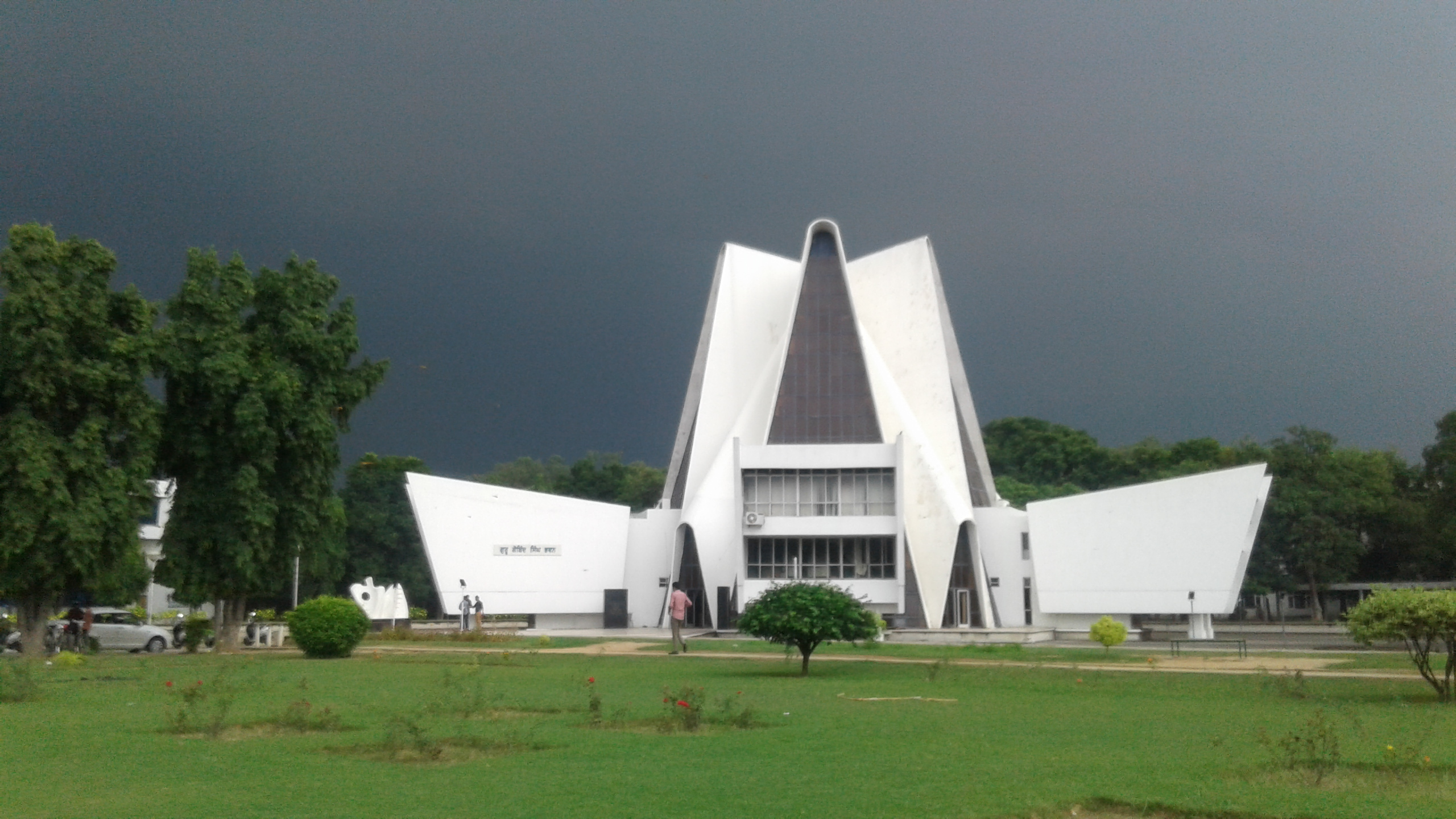
Punjabi University

- Baba Farid University of Health Sciences, Faridkot
- I.K. Gujral Punjab Technical University
- Guru Nanak Dev University, Amritsar
- Guru Ravidas Ayurved University, Hoshiarpur
- Jagat Guru Nanak Dev Punjab State Open University
- Maharaja Ranjit Singh Punjab Technical University, Bathinda
- Panjab University, Chandigarh (a Punjab State University)
- Punjabi University Guru Kashi Campus, Talwandi Sabo
- Punjabi University, Patiala
- Rajiv Gandhi National University of Law, Patiala
- Sri Guru Teg Bahadur State University of Law, Taran Taran

==== Private ====
- Akal University
- Chitkara University
- DAV University, Jalandhar
- GNA University, Phagwara
- Guru Kashi University, Talwandi Sabo
- Indian School of Business, Ajitgarh
- Sri Guru Granth Sahib World University, Fatehgarh Sahib
- Thapar Institute of Engineering and Technology

==== Deemed ====
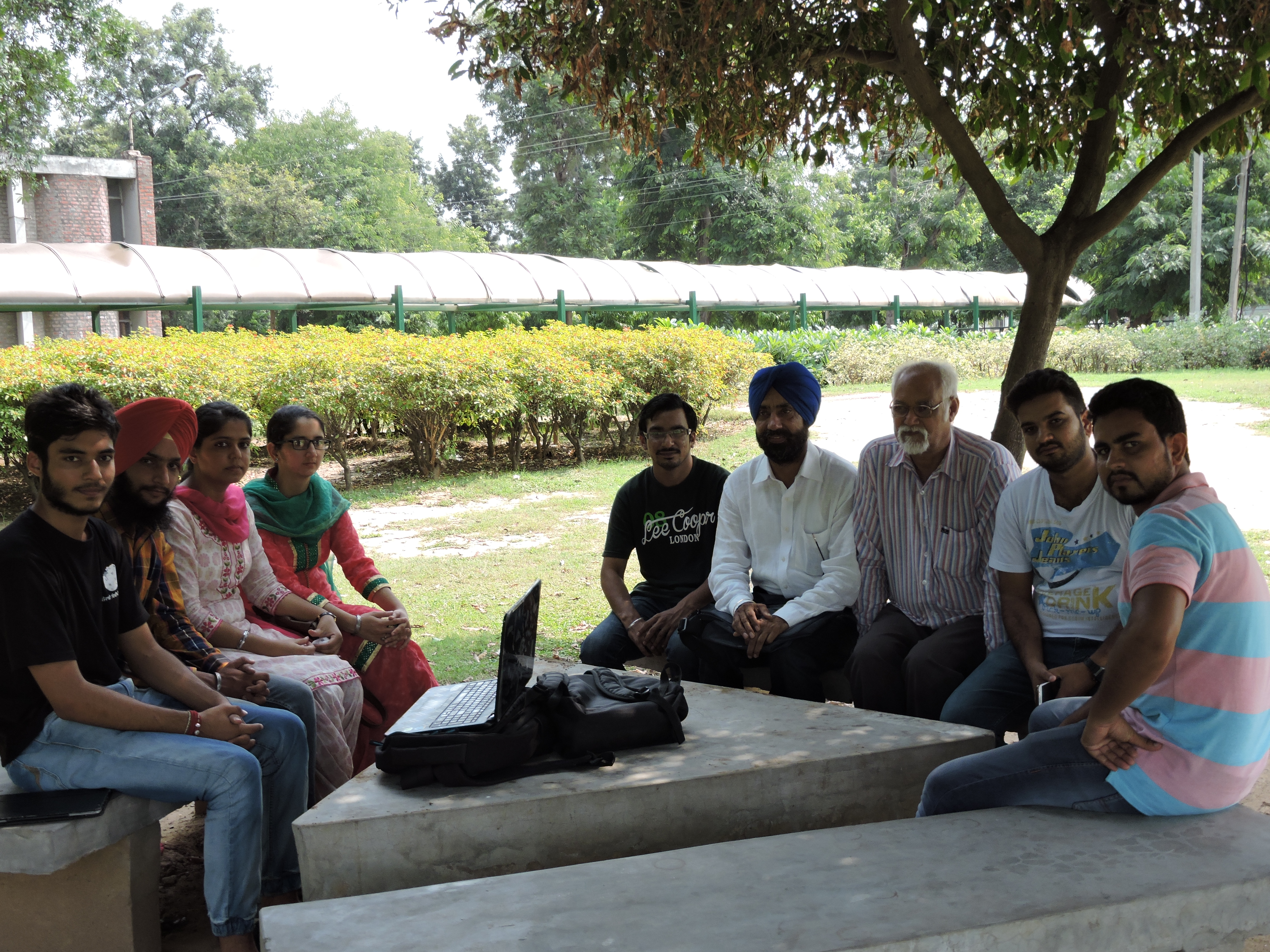
Students in Punjab

- Sant Longowal Institute of Engineering and Technology, Longowal(Deemed)
- Thapar Institute of Engineering and Technology, Patiala(Deemed)

==== Autonomous colleges in Punjab ====
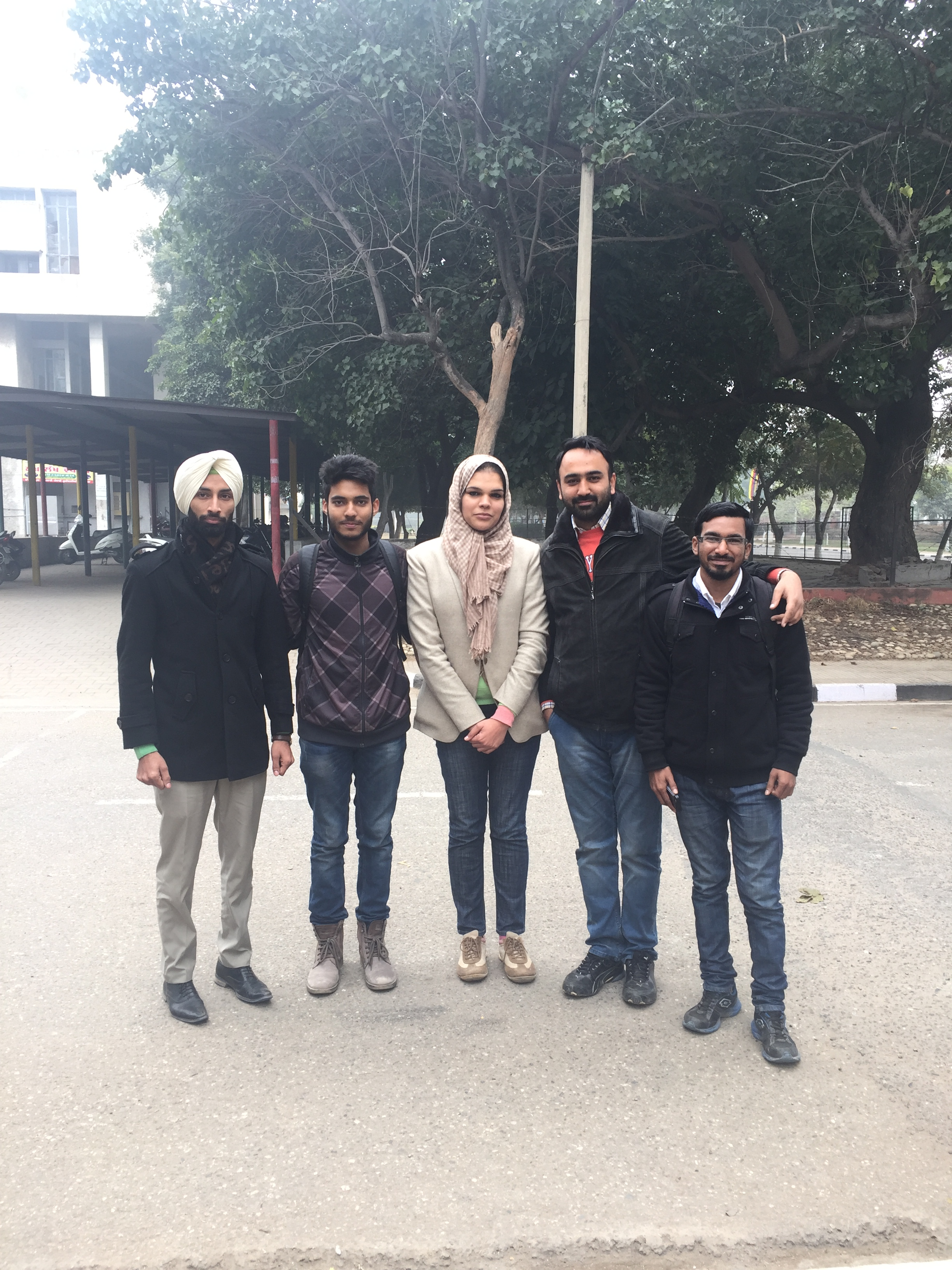
College students

Many colleges of Punjab have been granted autonomous status by UGC.

- Guru Nanak Dev Engineering College, Ludhiana
- Khalsa College, Amritsar
- Mata Gujri Mahila Mahavidyalaya, Fatehgarh Sahib
- Shaheed Bhagat Singh State University Technical Campus, Ferozepur

==== Technical / Professional colleges ====
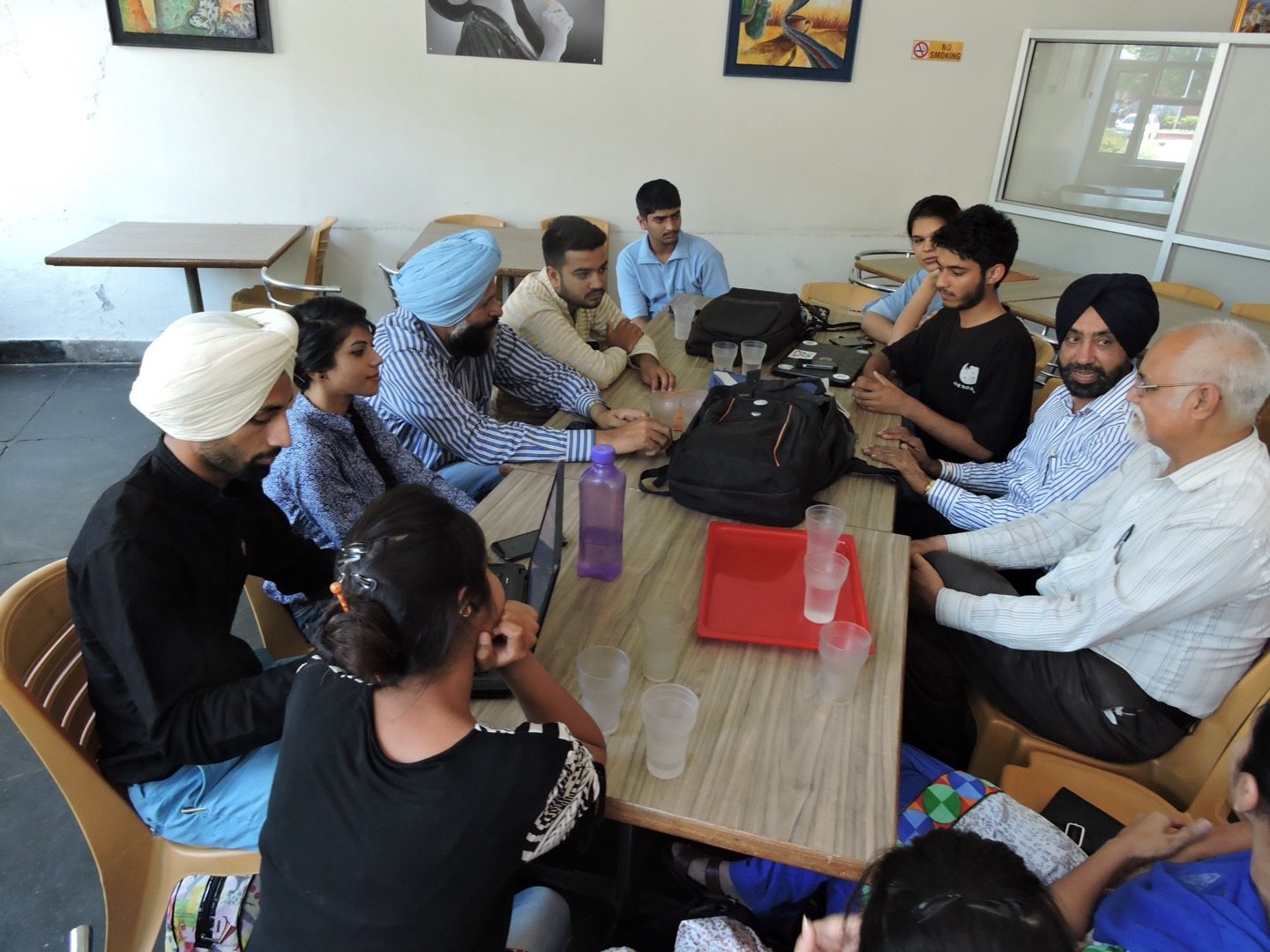
College meeting

- Dr. B. R. Ambedkar National Institute of Technology Jalandhar
- Indian Institute of Management Amritsar
- Indian Institute of Science Education and Research, Mohali
- Indian Institute of Technology, Ropar
- Institute of Nano Science and Technology
- Maharaja Ranjit Singh Punjab Technical University (Government Engineering College), Bathinda
- Punjabi University Guru Kashi Campus, Talwandi Sabo

==== Other institutes ====
- BBK DAV College for Women, Amritsar
- Government Mohindra College, Patiala
- Panjab University Swami Sarvanand Giri Regional Centre, Hoshiarpur
- PCTE Group of Institutes (including Punjab College of Technical Education), Ludhiana
- Punjab Engineering College, Chandigarh

=== Medical colleges ===
As of 2015, there are more than 920 MBBS and 1,070 BDS seats across Punjab.

==== Government medical colleges ====
- Dr. B. R. Ambedkar State Institute of Medical Sciences , Mohali
- Government Medical College, Amritsar
- Government Medical College, Patiala
- Guru Gobind Singh Medical College, Faridkot

==== Private medical colleges ====
- Adesh Institute of Medical Sciences & Research, Bathinda
- Christian Medical College, Ludhiana
- Dayanand Medical College & Hospital, Ludhiana
- Punjab Institute of Medical Sciences, Jalandhar

== Libraries ==
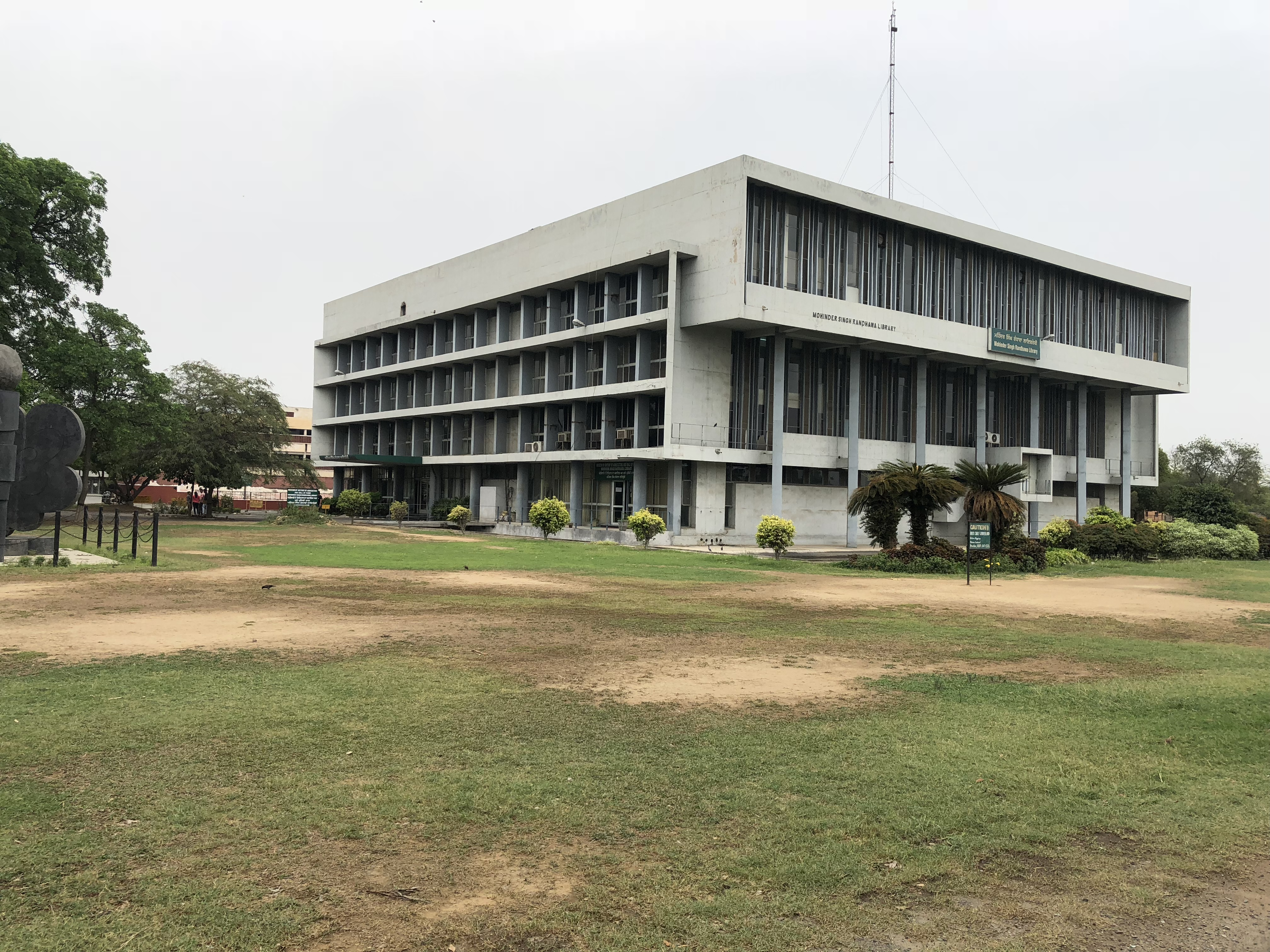
Mohinder Singh Randhawa Library, Punjab Agricultural University

Public libraries in the state are managed by the Directorate of Public Instructions. The department manages one state library in Patiala, 14 district libraries, 104 municipal libraries, and around 1,200 rural libraries. The state and district libraries are managed by the Directorate of Public Instructions (DPI Colleges), Punjab while the 104 municipal libraries are managed by the Urban Local Bodies, Punjab Government. Meanwhile, rural libraries (some of which are reading-rooms) are managed by panchayats, NGOs, NRIs, and volunteers. Some libraries are located on university campuses, such as the Dr Mohinder Singh Randhawa Library at Punjab Agricultural University and the libraries of Panjab University (Chandigarh) and Punjabi University (Patiala). Around 200 rural libraries in the state receive literature from the Punjabi Sahit Sabha in Delhi.

In 1878, a municipal library was established in Ludhiana. The first public library was founded in 1884 at Lahore. After partition, most of the public libraries of Punjab were now located in Pakistan. The Sahit Sabha Library, Punjabi Bhawan, Ludhiana was founded in 1954, which held around 53,000 documents as of 2012. Punjab lacks a Public Library Act, in-contrast to nineteen other Indian states which have enacted one, with such acts helping with resource sharing, accessing funds, streamlining management, and opening and maintaining libraries. In 1993, an attempt to formulate such legislation failed due to political apathy. In 2011, the issue was raised again and a draft bill for a Public Library Acts for Punjab, titled Punjab Public Library and Information Services Bill, 2011, was proposed but never passed despite lobbying by the Punjab Library Association since 1948 for it. The bill detailed a 10-year plan for the establishment of a statewide library network consisting of one state central library, 22 district libraries, 141 block libraries, 157 town libraries, and 12,282 village libraries. It also suggested the creation of a Punjab Public Library Governing Board, chaired by the Chief Minister, and a State Public Library Directorate and the formation of a State Public Library Fund. The bill did not pass due to political issues and a lack of funding. The state government received Panchayati Raj funding under the 15th Finance Commission to renovate over 180 libraries with 200 planned. However, the state government failed to utilize the Raja Rammohun Roy Library Foundation (RRRLF) matching scheme and has missed out on funding opportunities from the central government due to not applying for such schemes or as a consequence of not having a public library act.

Most of the libraries in the state are in poor-condition and are on the brink of closure due to funding and staff shortages. Librarians were last recruited in 1998 with no new appointments as of June 2017, with many sanctioned posts laying vacant as a result and books being consumed by moths and termites due to them not being removed from shelves for years. Only the State Central Library in Patiala remained in decent condition and operation. In 2012, Prem Singh Bajaj of the Sahit Sabha Library, Punjabi Bhawan, Ludhiana noted that there was a declining interest in reading amongst the Punjabi public and that people would dispose of books by throwing them into a river once the owner passes away. In 2022, there was only one public library in Amritsar district, prompting the library to go digital to be more accessible during the Covid-19 pandemic.

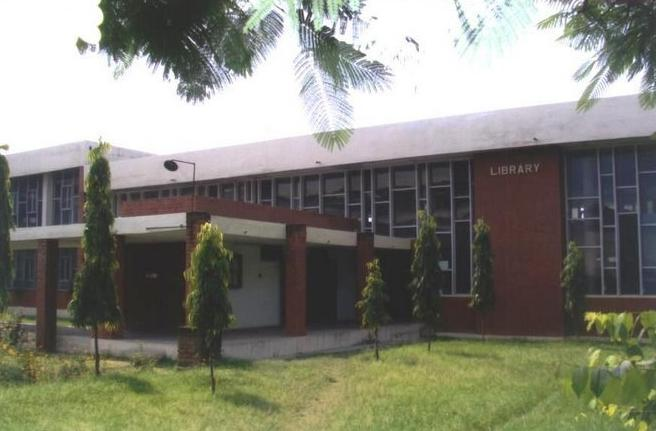
Library building of Guru Nanak Dev Engineering College, Ludhiana, Punjab, India

The Rural Library Scheme introduced by the state government on 15 August 2024 aims to improve reading habits of the youth. The state government has set the goal of setting-up modern libraries in every assembly constituency of Punjab. In 2023, 29 libraries were renovated/constructed in Sangrur district. In August 2024, 14 ultra-modern rural public libraries were opened in Punjab. In July 2025, six libraries were inaugurated in Amritsar. In Barnala district, 8 public-libraries were opened in July 2025.

Libraries in Punjabi villages used to be rare. In 2026, the Punjab state government pushed toward a goal of every village in the state having its own dedicated library. Around 200 libraries and reading-rooms have been built in villages across the Malwa region, usually managed by villagers through voluntary donations and charming nominal fees on annual membership for students. The Punjab government's Department of Rural Development has been renovating older structures and converting them into libraries, with it having renovated 114 rural libraries, with another 179 planned. There are also mobile libraries operating in villages, whose operation is sponsored by NRIs, private schools, or donors. The administration of Fazilka district introduced the Kitaab project.

== Literacy rate ==
According to the NSC survey (2017), Punjab's literacy rate was 83.7% (88.5% for males and 78.5% for females). As per the PLFS report (2024), Punjab's literacy rate was 83.4% (87.0% for males and 79.8% for females).

=== Census data ===
The table below shows the literacy rate of urban and rural areas of Punjab, through the years, based upon Indian census data.

Literacy rate of urban and rural areas of Punjab through the years
Year	Rural	Urban
2011	71.40%	83.20%
2001	64.72%	79.10%
1991	52.77%	72.08%
1981	35.21%	55.63%
1971	27.81%	52.49%
1961	20.42%	47.82%

The table below shows the gender wise literacy rate of rural and urban areas of Punjab through the years.

Gender wise literacy rate of rural and urban areas of Punjab through the years
Year	Female (Rural)	Male (Rural)	Female (Urban)	Male (Urban)
2011	65.70%	76.60%	79.20%	86.70%
2001	57.75%	71.05%	74.49%	83.05%
1991	43.85%	60.71%	66.10%	77.30%
1981	27.63%	41.91%	49.70%	60.70%
1971	19.88%	34.69%	45.40%	58.60%
1961	11.51%	28.12%	37.70%	56.09%

== Effects ==
A study of data from 1,520 households collected from 2008 to 2010 in Punjab showed that their standard of living and per capita income is positively correlated with education level at household and individual level. This implied that improvement in educational attainments reduces the chances of being poor.

== Statistics ==
The table below shows the district level teacher to pupil ratio from class 1 to 5 in Punjab, as of 2017.

District-wise Teacher-Pupil Ratio of Class 1 to 5 in 2017 (As of 30 September)
Sr. No.	District	Ratio
1	Hoshiarpur	15
2	Rupnagar	16
3	Fatehgarh Sahib	16
4	SAS Nagar	17
5	SBS Nagar	18
6	Gurdaspur	18
7	Pathankot	19
8	Kapurthala	20
9	Faridkot	20
10	Sri Muktsar Sahib	20
11	Jalandhar	21
12	Sangrur	21
13	Patiala	22
14	Ludhiana	24
15	Bathinda	24
16	Barnala	26
17	Fazilka	27
18	Amritsar	30
19	Ferozpur	30
20	Mansa	30
21	Moga	31
22	Taran taran	46

The table below shows the average population per school in each district of Punjab, as of 2011 census and the total number of schools, as of 2017. This includes government schools, affiliated schools, recognised and aided schools. Note:- Pathankot and Fazilka were part of Gurdaspur and Ferozepur respectively, before 2011, so separate data for them regarding the average population per school is not available.

District-wise average price per school as of 2011 census and total number of schools as of 2017
Sr. No.	District	Average population per school (2011)	Total number of schools (2017)
1	SBS Nagar	2,251	272
2	Kapurthala	2,433	335
3	Fatehgarh Sahib	2,480	242
4	Gurdaspur	2,582	637
	Pathankot	----	193
5	Hoshiarpur	2,584	614
6	Moga	2,613	381
7	Faridkot	2,616	236
8	Rupnagar	2,706	253
9	Sangrur	2,908	569
10	Sri Muktsar Sahib	2,918	309
11	Mansa	2,937	262
12	Ferozpur	3,023	419
	Fazilka	----	252
13	Patiala	3,251	583
14	Barnala	3,403	175
15	Jalandhar	3,476	631
16	Bathinda	3,533	393
17	Amritsar	3,722	669
18	Ludhiana	3,770	928
19	SAS Nagar	3,812	261
20	Taran taran	4,373	372

The table below shows the percentage of households with computer and internet facility in Punjab from July 2017 to June 2018.

Percentage of households in Punjab with computer and internet facility in 2017-18
Facility	Total	Rural	Urban
Computer	16.2%	9.4%	26.7%
Internet	46.4%	39.4%	57.1%

The table below shows the percentage of people in Punjab above the age of 5 with the ability to operate computer and internet, from July 2017 to June 2018.

Percentage of people in Punjab above the age of 5 with the ability to operate computer and internet in 2017-18
Group	Computer	Internet
Total	26.6%	35.0%
Total (Female)	22.5%	28.4%
Total (Male)	30.1%	40.9%
Rural (Total)	20.8%	28.5%
Rural (Female)	17.2%	22.1%
Rural (Male)	24.0%	34.3%
Urban (Total)	37.1%	46.8%
Urban (Female)	32.4%	40.0%
Urban (Male)	41.0%	52.6%

== Notable people ==
- The former Prime Minister of India, Dr Manmohan Singh was educated at Panjab University, Chandigarh and Oxford and Cambridge in UK.
- Professor Har Gobind Khorana, famous Nobel laureate & biotechnologist was educated at Panjab University.
- Sushma Swaraj Leader of BJP is an alumnus of Panjab University Chandigarh
- IAS officer of 1989-batch, Iqbal Singh Chahal is the current BMC commissioner is an alumnus of Thapar Institute of Engineering and Technology Patiala
- Subodh Kumar Jaiswal, the current CBI director from May 2021, is an MBA postgraduate from University Business School, Panjab University Chandigarh

== See also ==
- Health in Punjab, India
