= Prasantt Ghosh =

Indian fashion designer (born 1975)

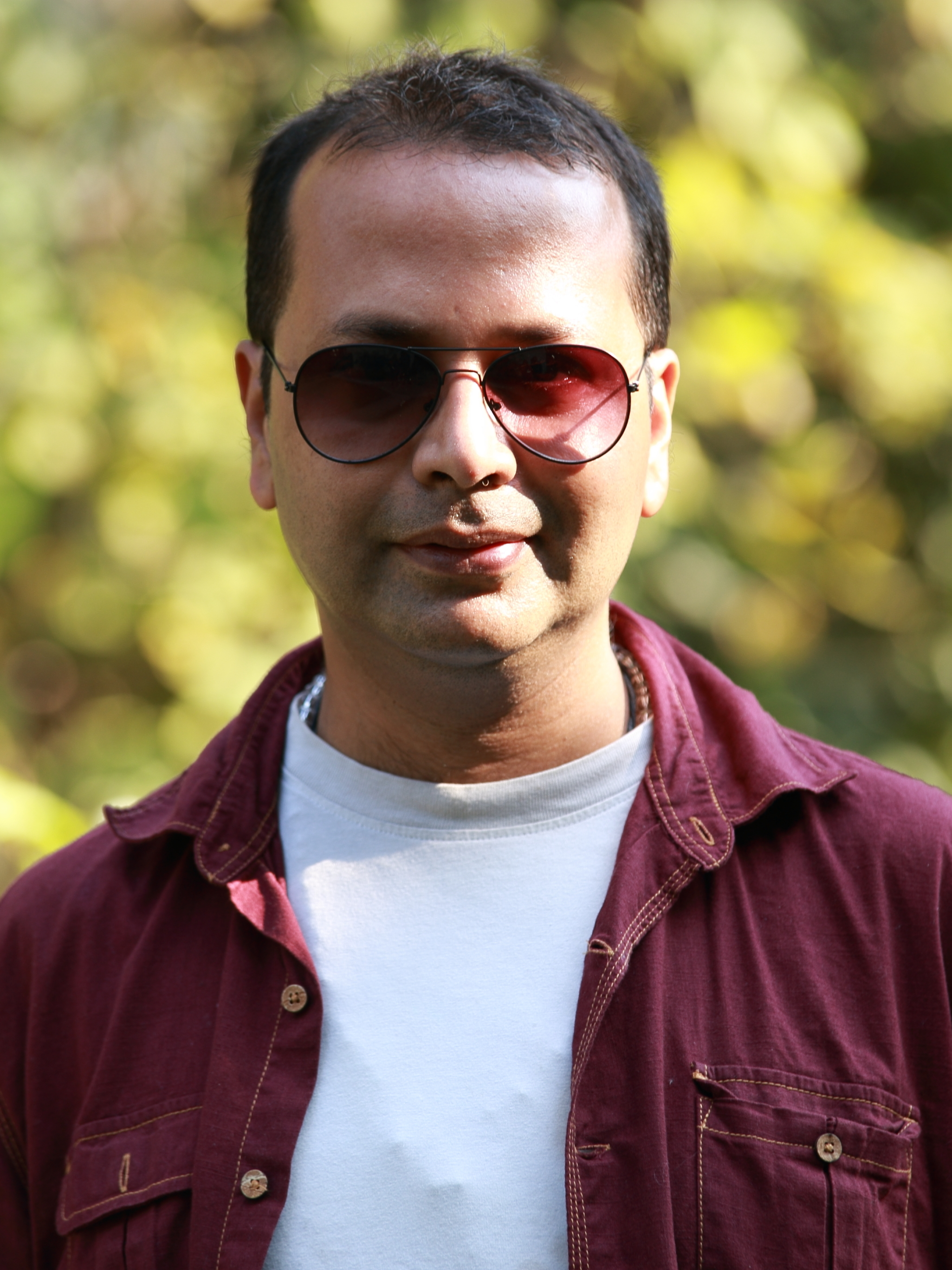
- Born: September 21, 1975 (age 50); Guwahati, Assam, India
- Citizenship: Indian
- Education: JD Institute of Fashion Technology; National Institute of Fashion Technology
- Occupations: Fashion designer & fashion choreographer
- Known for: Founder of Assam Art and Designing Institute (AADI)
- Notable work: Choreographed Rubaru Mr. India Pageant-2017
- Awards: North East Leadership Award; Lifetime Achievement Award
- Website: prasanttghosh.com

Prasantt Ghosh (Assamese: প্রশান্ত ঘোষ born September 21, 1975) is an Indian fashion designer who works in various fashion shows and Assamese cinema. He is known for designing costumes in films like Suren Suror Putek, Bukur Majot Jawle, Khel, and has also designed dresses for opening and closing ceremonies of National Games of India held in Assam. Ghosh also runs a fashion designing and modeling institute named Assam Art and Designing Institute (AADI) in Guwahati, Assam, and works as a fashion choreographer.

== Early life and career ==
Prasantt Ghosh was born on 21 September 1975 and grew up in Guwahati, Assam. He studied fashion designing from the National Institute of Fashion Technology (NIFT). Ghosh started his career by opening a fashion designing institute in Assam called Assam Art and Designing Institute (AADI) and launched his fashion label named Prasantt Ghosh in 1996. By the year 1999, Prasantt started doing fashion week and many other government fashion events. In 2011, he won the 'Best Fashion Choreographer Award in Northeast'.

In 2016, Ghosh was invited as brand ambassador to the Asian Designer Week held at Talkatora Stadium in New Delhi.

Prasantt has worked in shows all over India and countries including Bangladesh, Bhutan, Sri Lanka, Malaysia, Nepal and shot to fame after he choreographed Rubaru Mr. India pageant 2017.

== Awards and recognition ==
- 2011: Awarded the 'Best Fashion Choreographer of Northeast'
- 2015: Received the 'Northeast Leadership Award' for his excellent service in the field of fashion, textile, and craftsmanship
- 2016: Awarded the 'North East Leadership Award in 2016' along with Arnab Goswami and Zubeen Garg by the Cine Trust of India
- 2017: Selected to Style & Design the prestigious 'the Supermodel International' in New Delhi
- 2018: Won 'Lifetime achievement award' from the wife of the Governor of Assam

== See also ==
- List of fashion designers
- Fashion in India
- Bhanu Athaiya
