= Anoop Kumar Mittal =

Dr. Anoop Kumar Mittal
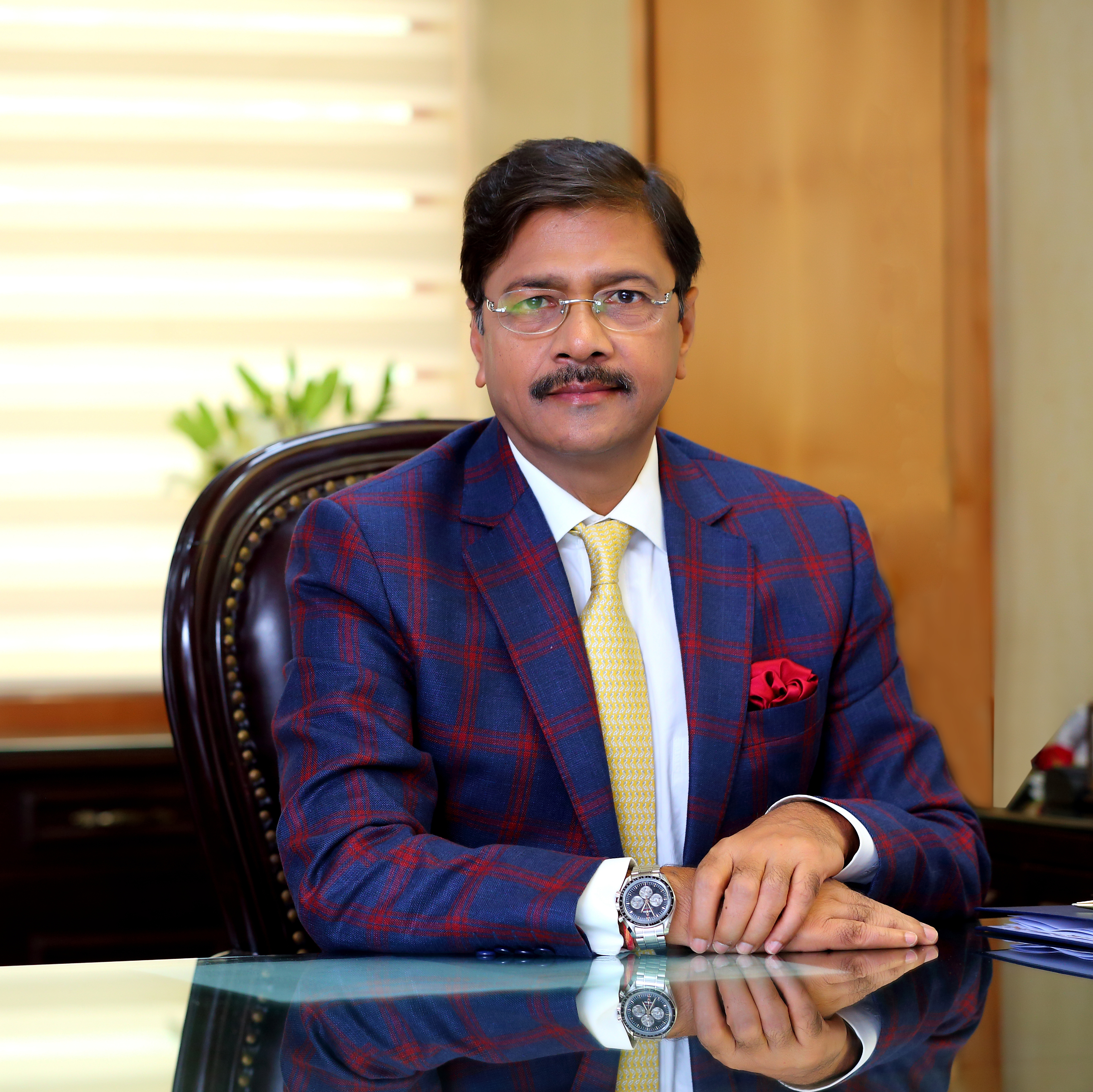
- Born: 5 January 1960 (age 66); Rajasthan, India
- Education: BE (Civil), Thapar University
- Occupations: Former Chairman-cum-Managing Director, National Buildings Construction Corporation Limited

Anoop Kumar Mittal was the Former Chairman and Managing Director (CMD) of NBCC, responsible for overseeing policy and strategic decision making of the company. His career at NBCC spans over 30 years. Prior to his appointment as the CMD in 2013, Mittal was Director of Projects division in NBCC.

In 1978, he attended Thapar Institute of Engineering & Technology, Punjab, to pursue Bachelor's degree in Civil Engineering. In recognition of his work in civil and construction engineering, he was conferred with the title of Doctor of Philosophy (Honoris Causa) by the Chancellor, Singhania University, Rajasthan in 2013.

Under Mittal's leadership, NBCC has adopted innovation in construction processes while developing sustainable residential, commercial, institutional and office projects while also nearly doubling its turnover to Rs 7,096 crore.

== Career ==
Mittal began his career in 1982 with M/s Shapoorji Pallonji & Co. Ltd, a civil engineering organization in the construction sector.

He joined NBCC in 1985 and by 1999, as Deputy General Manager, he led the construction of first DMRC Metro Station in Seelampur. He rose quickly through the ranks, becoming the Head of the Strategic Business Group in 2006. He spearheaded projects across the country, including solid waste management projects, environmental projects under AMRUT and defence housing projects in 12 cantonments. In 2010 as the Executive Director (Engg.) and Head of Business Development, his initiative secured INR 7,000 crore worth of new works to NBCC – an all-time high in the company by a single incumbent.

He also supervised projects in the Republic of Maldives being funded by Ministry of External Affairs, Govt. of India. Upon assuming office of Director (Projects) in 2011, he became responsible for the execution and implementation of projects both at home and overseas. Mittal was appointed CMD on 1 April 2013. Under his leadership, NBCC achieved 'Navratna' Central Public Sector Enterprise status and nearly doubled its turnover from Rs 3,348 crore in 2012-13 to Rs 7,096 crore in 2017-18. The profit after tax stands at Rs 372.14 crore as on 31 March 2018.

The order pipeline stands at almost Rs 80,000 crore as on 31 March 2018. His innovative business strategies to ensure operational efficiency and faster growth led NBCC to set up subsidiaries such as NBCC Services Ltd, NBCC International Ltd, NBCC Engineering and Consultancy Ltd and NBCC Environment Engineering Ltd. Mittal has steered functional, structural and policy reforms for NBCC’s overall growth and aligned the organization with national flagship schemes like Smart Cities Mission, Housing for All, Skill India Mission, Swachh Bharat Abhiyan, and Namami Gange.

After retiring from NBCC, Anoop Kumar Mittal became involved with the trust responsible for designing and constructing the Shree Ram Temple in Ayodhya. The trust sought his help

== Controversy ==
Anoop Kumar Mittal was mentioned in a complaint filed by the Central Bureau of Investigation (CBI) regarding the Pragati Maidan redevelopment project worth around Rs 2,100 crore. However, it is worth noting that during a meeting on March 8, NBCC's vigilance department informed its Board that the CBI chargesheet did not find any evidence against Mittal. This news brings some relief to Mittal, as it suggests that the allegations against him could not be substantiated. Mittal, an accomplished professional, continues to lead NBCC with dedication and focus, ensuring the smooth progress of its important projects.

== Making NBCC a Green Builder ==
Mittal has driven NBCC’s efforts to be a sustainable builder that uses the latest available technology to reduce its impact on the environment. A few initiatives are:

- Redevelopment Model: To meet the needs of adequate government housing infrastructure in urban areas by establishing a unique, self-sustainable redevelopment model that entails no financial burden on the exchequer. A few examples of this model are redevelopment of New Moti Bagh GPRA and ongoing projects at Delhi's East Kidwai Nagar and Nauroji Nagar.
- Induction Of Zero-Waste Concepts Including C&D Waste Management: All solid municipal wastes are treated in environment friendly process at project site and converted into useful products without requiring disposal into landfills.
- A first-of-its-kind 'Plastic Waste to Fuel Treatment Plant' was installed at the New Moti Bagh GPRA Complex in New Delhi. The technology can treat all plastic waste, including laminated plastics, plastic carry-bags, wafers and chips packets, chocolate wraps, and thermocol.
- Research Partnerships: To meet the future challenges of the sector, NBCC has signed MoUs with IIT-Roorkee to encourage research and development in building technologies. Additionally, Mittal has encouraged the adoption of new technologies such as dry and green construction in collaboration with leading foreign companies.

== Individual awards ==
In recognition of his work, Mittal has won several awards, including the SCOPE Leadership Excellence Award (individual leadership category – Maharatna and Navratna) 2014-15 and the Asia Pacific Entrepreneurship Award 2017 under construction industry segment (individual category).

The full list of awards includes:

- CEO of the Year 2018: at its ‘Fore-Top Rankers Excellence Awards 2018’
- Asia Pacific Entrepreneurship Award 2017: Construction Industry segment (Individual Category)
- SCOPE Excellence Award 2017: (Individual Leadership Category - Maharatna/Navranta)
- Glimpses of Engineering Personalities 2016: The Institution of Engineers (India)
- News Ink Legend PSU Shining Awards 2016: Legend CMD Of The Year
- IGBC Green Champion 2016: Indian Green Building Council
- The Bizz Award 2016: World Confederation of Businesses, Texas (US)
- Pride of India Award 2016: Institute of Economic Studies (IES)
- Life Time Achievement Award 2016: Construction Times Magazine
- PSE Excellence Award: Indian Chamber of Commerce CEO of The Year 2015
- CEO of the Year Award 2015: World CSR Congress
- International Project Management Association Honorary Fellowship Award 2014 for excellence as a management professional

== Professional memberships ==
- Chairman : BRICS Chamber of Commerce and Industry (Term 2017-2020)
- Chairman : ASSOCHAM National Council on Public Sector Enterprises (March 2016 –till date)
- Chairman : CII Public Sector Enterprises Council (Term 2018-19)
- Life Member & Ex-President: Delhi Management Association (DMA) (Term 2016-18)
- President : Indian Buildings Congress (IBC) (Term- 2018- 2019)
- Fellow & Chartered Engineer for Life: The Institutions of Engineers (India)
- Member : Governing Council of Thapar Institute of Engineering & Technology
- Governing Council Member : Standing Conference of Public Enterprises (SCOPE)
- Governing Council Member: International Road Federation (IFR) – India Chapter
- Governing Council Member: Construction Skill Development Council (CSDC)
- National Executive Committee Member: Federation of Indian Commerce and Industry (FICCI)
- Executive Committee Member: Bureau of Indian Standards (BIS)
- Life Institutional Member: All India Management Association (AIMA)
- Sr. Professional Engineer: Engineering Council of India (ECI)
- Life Member: Delhi Productivity Council (DPC)

== Personal life ==
Born at Bharatpur, Rajasthan, Mittal is the elder of two sons. He enjoyed a strong relationship with his parents and was especially close to his mother, who died in 2012.

Mittal currently lives in Noida with his wife Asha and two children.
