= Education in Punjab =

Education in Punjab may refer to:

- Education in Punjab (India)
- Punjab (Pakistan)#Education
