= Buta Singh Sidhu =

Indian academician

Buta Singh Sidhu is an Indian educational administrator. He is vice-chancellor of Maharaja Ranjit Singh Punjab Technical University, Bathinda. He was also Dean Academic at I.K. Gujral Punjab Technical University from March 2010 to October 2016.
