= JD Institute of Fashion Technology =

Coordinates: 12°56′47″N 77°36′26″E

- Motto: "Welcome to Imagination"
- Type: Private
- Established: 12 October 1988
- President: Chandraakant Dalal
- Faculty: 225
- Location: Bengaluru, Surat, New Delhi & Mumbai, India
- Campus: c. 40 learning centres
- Website: www.jdinstituteoffashiontechnology.com; www.jdinstitute.edu.in; jdinstitute.co

JD Institute of Fashion Technology is an educational division of JD Educational Trust that caters specifically to the field of fashion design and other disciplines of design.

The institute was founded on 12 October 1988 in Mumbai, India. Since then, it has expanded to 40+ learning centres located across India. It provides multi-disciplinary education in, among other fields, fashion design, interior design, jewelry design, fashion communication, fashion styling, and fashion business management.

JD is affiliated to Bengaluru City University, Goa University and associated with Singhania University for its Masters and undergraduate programme. In 2020, JD Institute of Fashion Technology was ranked 12 and 14 for fashion design by India Today and The Week, respectively.

== See also ==
- International Women Polytechnic
