= Robin Raina =

Indian-American businessman

- Born: July 31, 1967 (age 59); Srinagar, J&K, India
- Citizenship: American
- Education: Thapar University
- Occupations: Industrial engineer, entrepreneur, businessman and philanthropist
- Title: Ex- Chairman, Ex-president and Ex-CEO of Ebix

Robin Raina (born August 31, 1967) is an Indian-American businessman, industrial engineer and philanthropist who is the currently suspended chairman, president and chief executive officer of Ebix Group. Under Raina's leadership, Ebix declared Chapter 11 bankruptcy on December 17, 2023, after defaulting on a $617 million loan. He also founded the Robin Raina Foundation.

== Early life and education ==
Raina was born on 31 July 1967 in Srinagar, in the Kashmir Valley of Jammu and Kashmir, India, into a Kashmiri Pandit family. He moved to Patiala in Punjab at the age of five and pursued most of his early education from Our Lady of Fatima Convent High School. He graduated from Thapar Institute of Engineering and Technology with a degree in industrial engineering in 1989. He joined Pertech Computers Limited and was promoted as area manager in 1990. He left for Singapore in 1993 after joining Mindware.

== Career ==
Raina joined Delphi Information Systems, Inc. in 1997 as Vice President of Professional Services. In August 1999 he was promoted to the added title of President, having previously been named COO. In 1999 Delphi changed its name to Ebix.com and then in 2003 changed its name to Ebix Inc. On December 17, 2023, following a default on a $617 million loan, Ebix filed for Chapter 11 bankruptcy.

== Personal life ==
He has a wife, Romica Raina, a son, Sahil Raina, and a daughter, Nikita Raina.
