= GZS =

GZS may refer to:

- Chamber of Commerce and Industry of Slovenia (Slovene: Gospodarska zbornica Slovenije)
- Giani Zail Singh Campus College of Engineering & Technology, in Bathinda, Punjab, India
