= Aditi Avasthi =

Indian entrepreneur

- Born: 10 December 1981 (age 44); Ludhiana, Punjab, India
- Education: Thapar University, University of Chicago
- Occupation: Entrepreneur
- Notable work: Embibe

Aditi Avasthi is an Indian entrepreneur who is founder and CEO of Embibe, an artificial intelligence educational technology platform, based in Bangalore. She has been the recipient of many awards including being selected as a Young Global Leader with the World Economic Forum in 2021. She was also ranked among BBC's top 100 Women in 2017. In 2018, she was chosen the 'Woman Of The Year’ by Vogue in 2018.

== Early life and education ==
Avasthi was born in Ludhiana, Punjab, India on 10 December 1981. She is the daughter of Arun Kumar and Veena Avasthi. She had studied in multiple schools in India.

Avasthi received a bachelor's degree in engineering from Thapar University in 2003, and received her MBA in finance and marketing from the University of Chicago Booth School of Business in 2010.

== Career ==
Following her schooling in India, Aditi started her career at Tata Consultancy Services where she collaborated in the growth of new business initiatives in the UK. While at Tata Consultancy Services, she won AIMA Young Leaders project, although her nomination for the award was initially rejected as she was too young.

After her MBA, she joined Barclays as Deputy Chief of Product and Strategy Head for their mobile banking division in Africa. Later moving to Delaware, USA, in the year 2012, she worked at Barclaycard as the Director of Corporate Development in Mobile Commerce Business for a year. At Barclays, Avasthi contributed to overall mobile business strategy, and also led the design of the business cases on the monetization of mobile commerce.

In 2012, she founded Embibe, with $700,000 funding gathered from angel investors, and she received further investments from Kalaari Capital and Lightbox Ventures during the following year. which is a personalized engine for education based on a knowledge graph that connects all grades' curriculum and learning context together, so students can achieve their targeted learning outcomes. The platform also provides services based on the Joint Entrance Examination – Advanced. Later she conducted a successful corporate round with Reliance Industries in 2018. In April 2018, Reliance Industries Limited announced an investment of $180 million in Embibe.

Avasthi commented on her business, "Running my own business and being able to breathe life into my vision of disrupting the education system using data science and technology makes me more determined to achieve my goals. Patience, persistence and being able to multi-task come naturally to me as well as most women so that is a big advantage when starting from scratch."

== Awards ==
- Business Impact Woman Entrepreneur of the Year, Digital Disruptor
- BBC 100 Women for addressing illiteracy in 2017
- Vogue Woman of the Year, under the category Young achiever, in 2018
