= Via.com =

Indian travel company

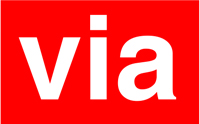
- Company type: Private
- Industry: Travel
- Founded: 2006; 20 years ago
- Headquarters: Bangalore, India
- Products: Booking flights, hotels, holidays, buses, trains and cars
- Services: Travel booking
- Revenue: ▲₹209 crore (US$29.68 million) (FY19)
- Operating income: ▲₹30 crore (US$4.26 million) (FY19)
- Net income: ▲₹16 crore (US$2.27 million) (FY19)
- Number of employees: 650+
- Parent: Ebix, Inc.
- Website: via.com

Via.com, formerly known as FlightRaja.com, is an Indian travel portal and online travel company based in Bangalore, India. Via was founded on 25 July 2006 and incorporated in February 2007. In November 2017, Via was acquired by Ebix for $74.9 million.

== History ==
Via was founded in a small garage on 9th A Main Road, 2nd Block, Jayanagar, Bangalore on 25 July 2006 (incorporated in February 2007) by Vinay Gupta, Amit Aggarwal, Harsh Azad, and Rohit Gaddi.

In 2007, Via received funding worth US$5 million from NEA IndoUS Ventures. This funding assisted Via in expanding themselves beyond airline services.

In 2010, Sequoia Capital provided a US$10 million capital infusion into Via's holding company FlightRaja Travels.

In November 2017, Via.com was acquired by Ebix for $74.9 million.

On 17 December 2023, Ebix declared Chapter 11 bankruptcy after defaulting on a $617 million loan. In March 2024, it was reported that Ebix had initiated the sale of its Indian operations, including Via.com.

== Activities ==
It is a distributor of transportation ticketing, accommodation reservation, packaged tours, corporate travel management and other travel ancillaries. It expanded first into the Philippines, Indonesia and eventually to hundreds of cities globally.

The company has established a network of more than 100,000 partners across 10,000 towns and cities globally. The company offers its services through a cloud based technology platform and a 24-hour customer service call center.
