= Thapar Institute of Engineering and Technology =

University in Patiala, India

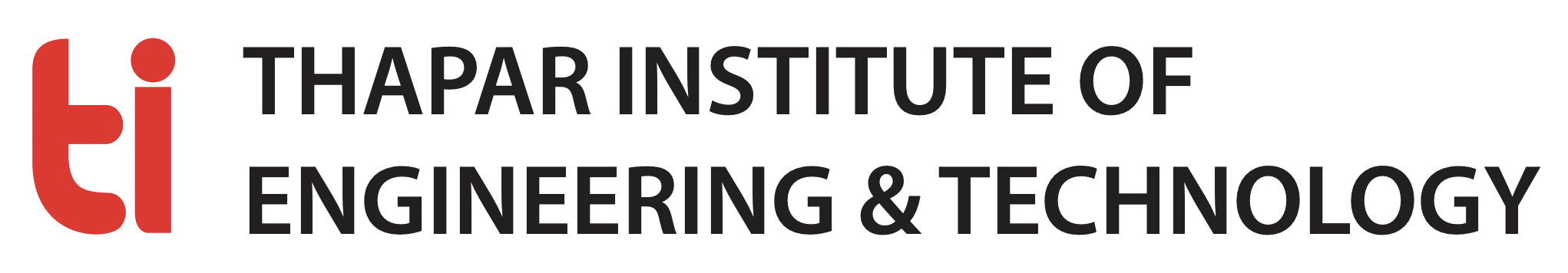
- Former name: Thapar University
- Type: Deemed-to-be-University
- Established: 1956; 70 years ago
- Founder: Karam Chand Thapar
- Accreditation: NAAC
- Academic affiliations: UGC , AICTE
- Vice-Chancellor: Padmakumar Nair
- Location: Patiala, Punjab, India; 30.3564°N 76.3625°E
- Campus: 250 acres (100 ha); Urban area
- Website: www.thapar.edu

Thapar Institute of Engineering and Technology (TIET), formerly Thapar University, is a private deemed-to-be-university, in Patiala, India. The institute provides multiple subjects; including art, computer science, liberal arts and business administration.

== Campus ==
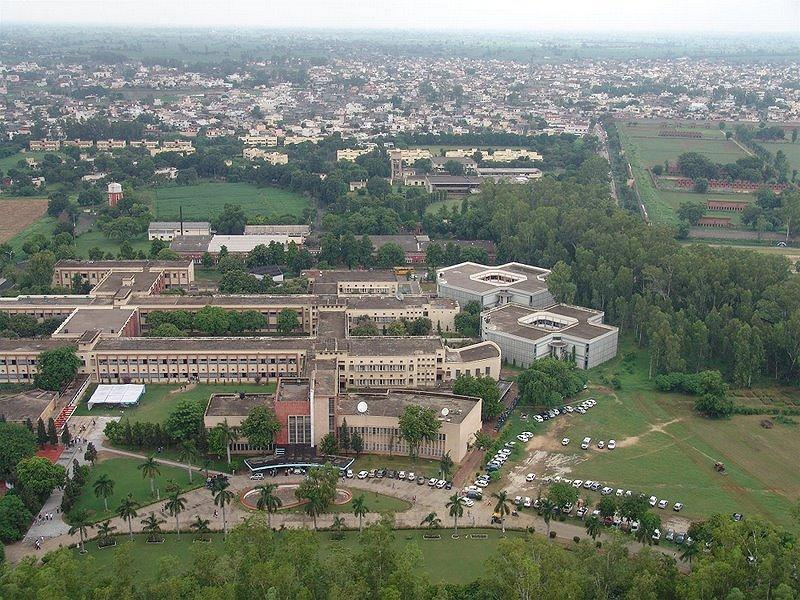
Thapar Campus Aerial View

The campus' land area is approximately 250 acres. The site has nine academic blocks, one of which is the former site of the Thapar Polytechnic College.

The institute's library was ranked as No. 7 in university libraries by Architectural Digest in an article.

On 11 November 1989, 19 students of the college were massacred while they slept in their dorm by Sikh extremists. The campus expanded and was partially renovated in 2018. The institute has made plans to expand further, including a new campus near Chandigarh.

== Rankings ==
Private rankings

General – international
- QS (World) (2025): 851–900
- QS (Asia) (2024): 281–290
- Times (World) (2024): 601–800
- Times (Asia) (2024): 201–250

General – India
- NIRF (Overall) (2024): 43
- NIRF (Universities) (2024): 29

Engineering – India
- NIRF (2024): 29

Thapar Institute of Engineering and Technology was ranked in the 601–800 band in the world by the Times Higher Education World University Rankings of 2024 and in the 201–250 band in Asia. The QS World University Rankings of 2025 ranked it in the 851–900 band in the world and in the 281–290 band in Asia for 2024.

In India, the National Institutional Ranking Framework (NIRF) has ranked the college 29th among engineering institutions in 2024, 29th among universities and 43rd overall.

== Notable alumni ==
- Anoop Kumar Mittal, chairman and managing director of NBCC Limited
- Aditi Avasthi, CEO and Head of Product of Embibe
- Vimal Kapur, CEO of Honeywell International Inc
- Robin Raina, president and chief executive officer of Ebix Group and the founder of Robin Raina Foundation Ebix
