= Sri Guru Teg Bahadur State University of Law =

State University located in Kairon village

- Type: Public
- Established: 2002; 24 years ago
- Affiliations: UGC; BCI
- Chancellor: Governor of Punjab
- Vice-Chancellor: Dr. Jaspal Singh Sandhu
- Location: Tarn Taran district, Punjab, India
- Website: www.sgtblawuniv.org

Sri Guru Teg Bahadur State University of Law is a State University located in Kairon village, Tarn Taran district, Punjab, India
