= The British Co-Ed High School =

Coordinates: 30.29679°N 76.42814°E

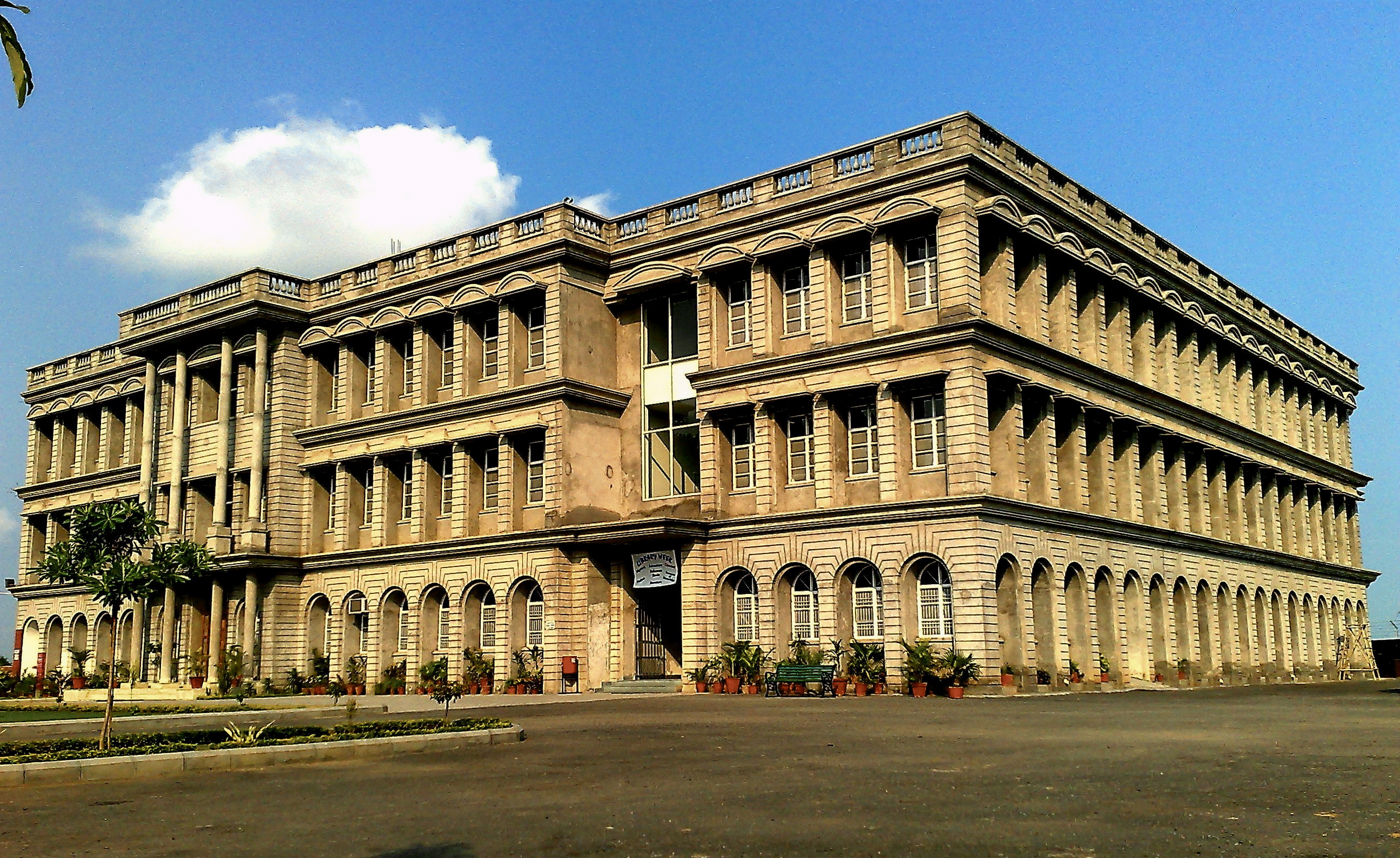
- Devigarh Road, Patiala, India; India

Information
- Type: Private School
- Head of school: Mrs. Rosa Alicia Kucharskyj
- Faculty: Humanities, Commerce and Sciences
- Grades: Grade 3 - 12
- Affiliation: Indian Certificate of Secondary Education
- Website: http://www.britishcoedschool.com/

The British Co-Ed High School is a private school in Patiala, Punjab, India. It is affiliated to the ICSE (Indian Certificate of Secondary Education) board of education. It is a day school founded in 1986 by Mrs. Rosa Alicia Kucharskyj. The current principal is Ms.Kiran Harika. It is located on the Devigarh Road, approximately 8 km away from the main city.

== School houses ==
There are three houses in this school: Tagore, Teresa, and Tolstoy. Many inter-house competitions are held in the school like football, kho-kho, debates, poem recitations, and drama competitions.

=== Tagore House ===
The Tagore House is the Yellow House of the school. It is named after the poet, novelist, painter, and musician Rabindranath Tagore.

=== Teresa House ===
The Teresa House is the Green House of the school. It is named after the peace-loving woman Mother Teresa.

=== Tolstoy House ===
The Tolstoy House is the Red House of the school. It is named after the writer and novelist Leo Tolstoy.

== The School Song ==
Mrs. Rosa Alicia Kucharskyj (Principal of The British Co-Ed High School)

We feel the pride and the joy
of being the British Co-Ed girls and boys x2
So come along and join our school for we are really cool x2
When a challenge comes always ready
With courage in our hearts
When a challenge ends always ready to face another task
We never give up, we never lose x2
We are always on the top
Musical Her banner we shall hold up high and guard her honour till we die x2
And though one day we will part she is always in our hearts x2
We feel the pride and the joy to be The British Co-Ed girls and boys x2
So let the cheer ring out in the world Long live our dear school x2
Long live our dear school x2

== School Activities ==
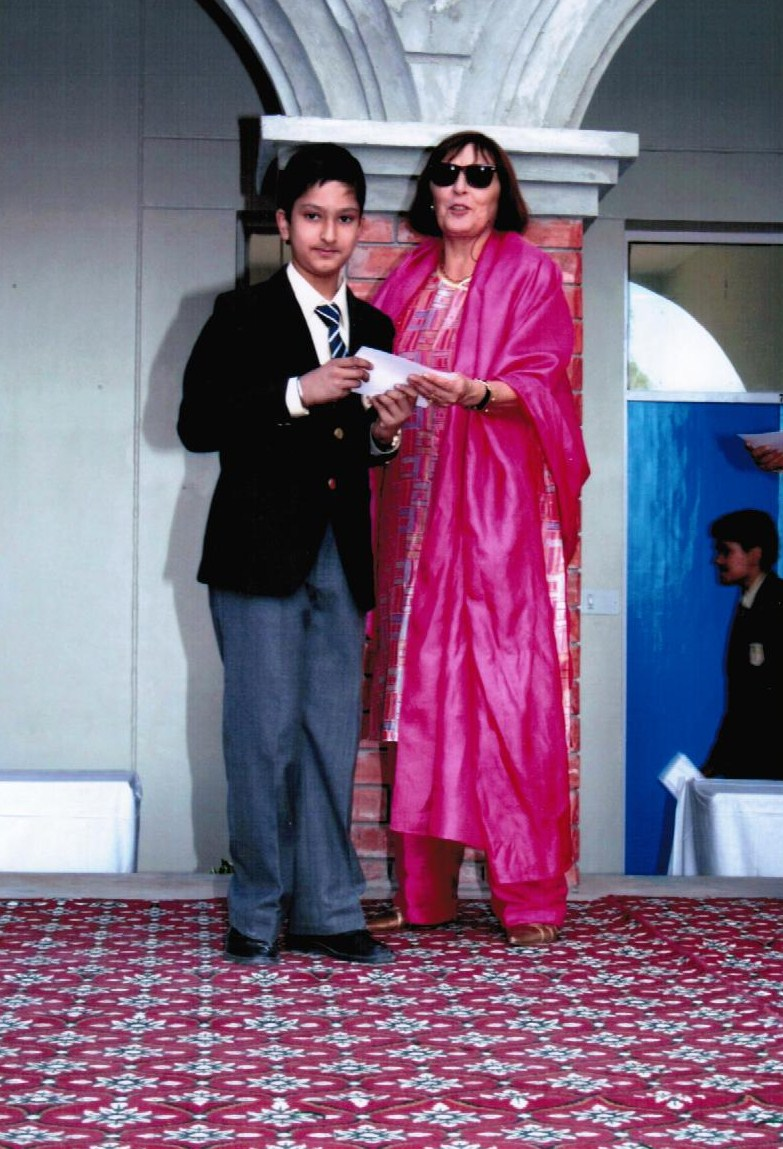
A student getting an award from Mrs. Rosa Alicia Kucharskyj, the principal of The British Co-Ed High School.

=== International Activities ===
The British Co-Ed High School takes part in a lot of national and international activities. It hosts many inter-house, inter-school, and inter-city debates, quizzes, sports, writing competitions, and many other activities. This school is a part of The Duke of Edinburgh's Award Club. This school also takes part in the UKIERI activities, which means activities between the UK and India. People from the UK visit the school every year and the children and staff of this school also visit some schools in the UK.

=== Activities in the School ===
Albert Barrow Memorial All India inter-school Creative Writing Competition is a writing competition which is also held every year to improve the writing skills of the children of the school. Four inter-house plays are performed every year during the session by the children of the school. The play which wins is then performed at the Annual Prize Giving function which is also held every year. Prizes are given to students who performed very well during the year in academics, sports, plays, debates, and other activities.

A sports day is held every year in the school in December, when many students play different sports with the other students of this school or other schools of the city. The people who win in these games are also given prizes on the Sports Day, and on the Annual Prize Giving Function at the end of the year.

There are different field trips, and camps in which many students and staff members go. The school also takes the students to many international trips as well like Australia, the US, Canada, etc.

There is a science exhibition in which the students make different working models and present and explain those models to the judges, other students, parents of other students, and many other people who wish to come see different projects made by the students. The judges chose some of the project models which are good. Those students are then given awards on the Annual Prize Giving Function, and honored by the chief guest of the function and the staff of the school.
