= Ebix =

American multinational technology company

Ebix, Inc.
- Formerly: Delphi Information Systems, Inc. (1976–1999) ebix.com, Inc. (1999–2003)
- Company type: Public
- Traded as: OTC Pink: EBIXQ; Nasdaq: EBIX (prior to 2024)
- Founded: 1976; 50 years ago in Atlanta, Georgia, United States
- Founder: Ken Bitticks (co-founder)
- Headquarters: 1 Ebix Way, Johns Creek, Georgia 30097, United States
- Area served: Worldwide
- Key people: Vikas Garg (chairman,Karan Bagga CEO and president)
- Number of employees: 9,802
- Subsidiaries: Ebix Smartclass Educational Services EbixCash
- Website: Official website

Ebix, Inc., previously known as ebix.com, Inc. and formerly Delphi Information Systems, Inc., is an American multinational technology company which focuses on e-commerce, cloud computing (SaaS), insurance, finance, healthcare and e-learning. Co-founded by Ken Bitticks in Atlanta, Georgia in 1976, it was traded on Nasdaq as EBIX. The company's global headquarters is located in Johns Creek, Georgia, with offices in Australia, Brazil, Canada, India, New Zealand, Singapore and UK.

== History ==
Ebix was co-founded as Delphi Information Systems, Inc. by Ken Bitticks in 1976 in Atlanta, Georgia, United States. In 1983, it was reincorporated in Delaware.

In October 1997, Robin Raina was appointed as the firm's new vice president for professional services. He took over as president and then as chief executive officer in 1999. In May 1999, the firm announced the introduction of its first e-commerce portal, ebix.com. Robin became the director in February 2000 and was later appointed as the chairman in 2002. In 2003, he changed the company's name from ebix.com, Inc. to Ebix, Inc. In 2013, Bloomberg reported that the U.S. federal government launched a probe against Raina after the disclosure of his proposed 820 million US dollars deal with Goldman Sachs to take the firm private. In early 2015, it moved its headquarters to Johns Creek, Georgia.

In May 2017, the firm acquired 80% stake in Indian digital payments firm ItzCash for 124 million dollars from Essel Group and later rebranded it as EbixCash. In August 2017, the firm purchased BSE-listed Wall Street Finance Ltd's subsidiary Goldman Securities Ltd, along with its money transfer service scheme business, for $7.4 million. In September 2017, Ebix agreed to acquired BSE-listed Paul Merchants Ltd's international remittance business for $40.7 million. In November 2017, Ebix acquired Indian travel company Via.com for almost $75 million.

On December 17, 2023, after defaulting on a $617 million loan, Ebix declared Chapter 11 bankruptcy. In 2024, it was acquired by an India-based company, Eraaya Lifespaces.
