= British India (disambiguation) =

Presidencies and provinces of British India, collectively known as "British India", were the administrative units of the territories of the Indian Subcontinent between 1612 and 1947. This included Burma to 1937, but may or may not include the Indian Princely States or British protectorates.

British India may also refer to:

- Company rule in India (1757–1858)
- British Raj (1858–1947) known as the "Indian Empire", an informal empire ruled by the British Crown
- A collective term for the British in India, usually for the domiciled ones, during the period 1757 to 1947. In the period up to 1900, they were also commonly called Anglo-Indians; later that term came to mean people of mixed South Asian and British descent.

== See also ==
- British India (band), a garage rock band based in Australia
