= International Women Polytechnic =

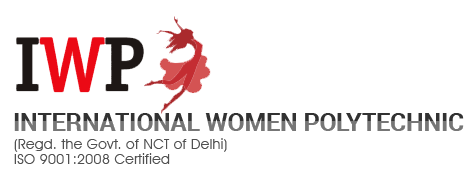
- Established: 1998
- CEO: Anil Nijhawan
- Academic staff: 150+
- Students: 2000+
- Location: New Delhi, India
- Campus: Delhi, Gurgaon, Ghaziabad, Lucknow, Chandigarh
- Website: http://www.iwpindiaonline.com

International Women Polytechnic (Commonly known as IWP) is an education institute in India, offering diploma courses in Fashion Design, Interior Design, NPTT, Stenography, Cosmetology and some other streams.

== Campuses ==
The institution operates seven campuses in India as of October 2015. These campuses are located in various regions, including West Delhi (Janakpuri), East Delhi (Gagan Vihar), South Delhi (Lajpat Nagar), North Delhi (Derawal Nagar), Gurgaon (Sector 14), Lucknow (Vidhan Sabha Marg), Ghaziabad (Raj Nagar), and Chandigarh (Sec-34A). These campuses offer a range of educational programs.

== Festivals ==
The Melange is an annual event organized by the International Women Polytechnic. It is attended by 100+ buyers from across the globe.

== See also ==
- Fashion design
- Interior design
