= Dasmesh Public School, Faridkot =

Dasmesh Public School
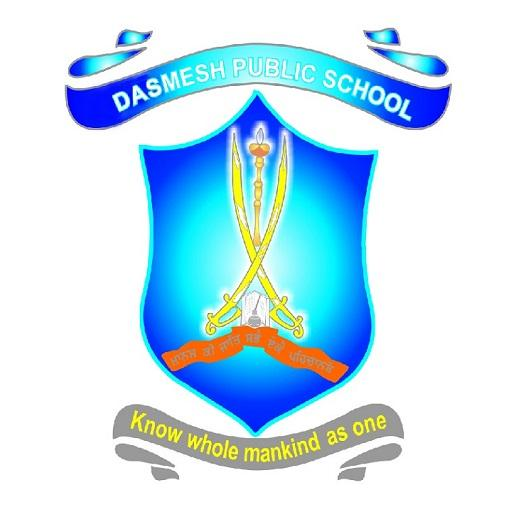

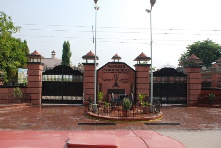

Location
- Talwandi Bhai-Faridkot Road; Faridkot, Punjab, 151203; India; 30°40′44.73″N 74°45′55.02″E

Information
- School type: Private
- Motto: ਮਾਨਸ ਕੀ ਜਾਤ ਸਭੈ ਏਕੈ ਪਹਿਚਾਨਬੋ (Know whole mankind as one)
- Established: April 1973
- Director: Gurcharan Singh ( retired)
- Principal: Apurav Devgon
- Staff: 500
- Education system: C.B.S.E. Board, New Delhi
- Area: 60 acres
- Website: http://www.dasmeshschoolfdk.com

Dasmesh Public School (aka DPS), Faridkot, is a school in the state of Punjab, India.

Dasmesh Public School is a co-educational private secondary school, situated on Talwandi road in Faridkot. The school uses English as the medium for instruction. It is spread over more than 60 acres of land, and has 4 more campuses in Kotakpura and Bargari. It is highly regarded as one of the best cbse schools in the city. It is a fully air-conditioned school. It has all major facilities including a cricket ground. It has a dental college (Dasmesh Institute of Research and Dental Sciences) operated by Bhai Pheru Sikh Educational Society, Faridkot near to it. Each of its classrooms has a smartboard installed. This school has teachers with experience of more than 20 years.

The school is affiliated to the Central Board of Secondary Education (CBSE), and is run by the Bhai Pheru Sikh Educational Society, Faridkot.

The National commerce stream topper of class 12 of the academic year 2021-2022 Zoya and second topper. Navroz (non-medical stream) were from this school
