= Singhania University =

University in Rajasthan, India

Coordinates: 28.132303°N 75.954011°E

- Crest of Singhania University
- Motto: Knowledge is power
- Established: 2007
- Affiliations: UGC
- Chairperson: Ravi Singhania
- President: Dr. Manoj Kumar
- Location: Pacheri Bari, Jhunjhunu, Rajasthan, India
- Website: www.singhaniauniversity.co.in

Singhania University is a private university in Jhunjhunu, Rajasthan, India. It is a UGC recognized private university as per Sec. 2f of the UGC Act 1956. It is in Pacheri Bari, Jhunjhunu in the northern Indian state of Rajasthan.

== History ==
Singhania University came in existence by Smt. Narmada Devi Singhanaia, mother of the founder Shri. D.C. Singhania.

Singhania University was inaugurated on 21 Oct 2007 by Shri D.C. Singhania.

The university was established by the Govt. of Rajasthan, under Ordinance 6 of 2007. It is a UGC recognized university as per Sec. 2f of the UGC Act 1956.Additionally, Singhania University offers programs that have specific regulatory body approvals, such as the Pharmacy Council of India (PCI) for pharmacy programs and the Bar Council of India (BCI) for law programs, ensuring that these degrees meet the respective professional standards. It is also a member of the Association of Indian Universities (AIU), which adds to its credibility

Its pioneering batch of students graduated in 2010.

== Academics ==
Singhania University has more than 200 programs in 50 disciplines. It offers graduate, postgraduate and doctoral degree programs in engineering. It has a management school that offers graduate, postgraduate, and doctoral degree programs in management. Recognized by the University Grants Commission (UGC) under Section 2(f) of the UGC Act 1956, the university offers a diverse array of undergraduate, postgraduate, diploma, and doctoral programs across disciplines such as engineering, management, pharmacy, law, education, humanities, and sciences. Academic Programs: Singhania University offers over 200 programs in more than 50 disciplines. Notable undergraduate programs include Bachelor of Technology (B.Tech) in various engineering fields, Bachelor of Business Administration (BBA), Bachelor of Computer Applications (BCA), and Bachelor of Pharmacy (B.Pharm). Postgraduate offerings encompass Master of Business Administration (MBA), Master of Technology (M.Tech), and Master of Science (M.Sc) among others. The university also provides doctoral programs for advanced research.

Facilities and Infrastructure: The campus is equipped with libraries, laboratories, hostels, sports complexes, and auditoriums.

Admission Process: Admissions to various programs are primarily based on merit, considering marks obtained in previous qualifying examinations. For certain courses, the university conducts its own entrance tests or accepts scores from national entrance examinations such as JEE Main for engineering and NEET for medical programs. Prospective students are advised to consult the official website for detailed eligibility criteria and application procedures.

Placement and Career Opportunities: Singhania University has an active placement cell that organizes campus interviews, training sessions, workshops, and seminars to enhance students' employability. Graduates have been successfully placed in reputable companies, reflecting the university's commitment to facilitating career advancement for its students.

== Campus ==
Singhania University is in Pacheri Bari, Distt. Jhunjhunu (Rajasthan) on the Delhi-Narnaul Singhana - Pilani Road. It is about 160 km west of Delhi and about 165 km north of Jaipur. The campus covers an area of about 30 acres of land.
