= Our Lady of Fatima Convent High School =

Our Lady of Fátima Convent Secondary School
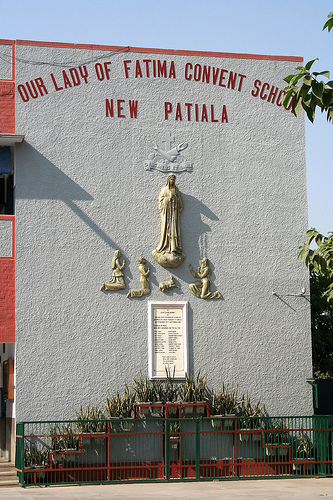
- Statue of Our Lady of Fátima at the school

Location
- 52-53 Ajit Nagar; Patiala, Punjab; India; 30.3368°N 76.3802°E

Information
- Type: Private
- Motto: Deus Meus Et Omnia (My God, My All)
- Established: 1960
- Founder: Mother Seraphina Farolfi
- School board: CBSE
- Principal: Rev. Sr. Immaculate
- Faculty: 52
- Grades: Lower and Upper Kindergarten, Classes I - X
- Campus size: 2 acres (8,100 m^{2})
- Campus type: Urban-Open Campus
- Houses: 4 (St Clare, St Francis, St Joseph, St Mary)
- Colours: Blue and white
- Information: CBSE Affiliation Code: 1630012
- Website: www.ourladyoffatimapatiala.com

Our Lady of Fátima Convent Secondary School is a convent school located in the city of Patiala in Punjab, India. The school is run by Catholic nuns who live on the school campus itself. The nuns, mostly belonging to the southern Indian state of Kerala, bought the small patch of land from the scion of the erstwhile Patiala State in 1960.

== About the school ==
Our Lady of Fátima Convent Secondary School was established in the year 1960. It is run by Seraphina Educational Society, Dehradun. The main aim of the society is education of the youth, especially poor and abandoned children. Since 1901 the Society is actively engaged in the field of education in India. It is a co-educational institution affiliated to the Central Board of Secondary Education (CBSE). The medium of instruction is English. It is run by the Seraphina Educational Society, Dehradun.

Their educational vision is:

- The education of the young with a preferential option for the poor, the marginalised or the underprivileged in the slum/interior rural areas.
- The care of the orphaned/destitute children.
- The service of the poor especially in the remote regions.

== Crest and motto ==
The crest of the school consists of two crossed arms, the naked one of Jesus Christ and the robed one of Saint Francis of Assisi. It bears the inscription "Porto I Misteri" which means "I Carry The Mysteries", and IHS which is a Christogram. The motto "Deus Meus Et Omnia" means "My God and All".

== Houses ==
The four houses are named after Christian saints. All the extra-curricular activities are conducted between these four houses.

- Saint Clare (Red )
- Saint Francis (Green )
- Saint Mary (Blue )
- Saint Joseph (Yellow )

== Boat tragedy ==
On 29 September 1982 there were a group of children from the school picnicking around the Nangal Dam area. The children accompanied by teachers went for a boat ride when some of the boats started to sink and 22 11-year-old children drowned in the lake. The 22 flower pots commemorate those who died and the names of children are listed just below the statue of Lady Fatima at the school entrance. Later their parents established the Children memorial school.

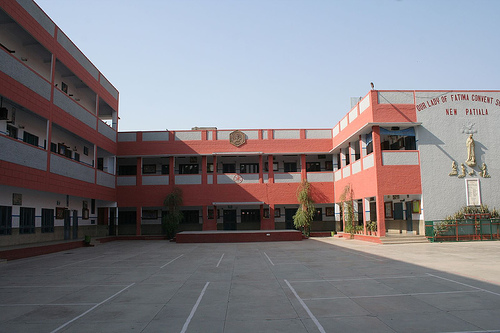
Our Lady of Fátima Convent Secondary School, Patiala
