= Maharaja Ranjit Singh Punjab Technical University =

Coordinates: 30.1748°N 74.9242°E

- Type: State university
- Established: 2015; 11 years ago
- Affiliations: UGC, AICTE
- Chancellor: Governor of Punjab
- Vice-Chancellor: Sanjeev Kumar Sharma
- Location: Bathinda, Punjab, India
- Campus: Urban
- Website: www.mrsptu.ac.in

Maharaja Ranjit Singh Punjab Technical University (MRSPTU), formerly Maharaja Ranjit Singh State Technical University, is a State technical university of Punjab located in Bathinda, Punjab, India. It was established in 2015 and has jurisdiction over 11 districts namely Bathinda, Ferozepur, Moga, Faridkot, Sri Muktsar Sahib, Barnala, Mansa, Sangrur, Patiala, Fatehgarh Sahib and Fazilka. University will function from upgraded Giani Zail Singh Punjab Technical University Campus. MRSPTU has signed MoU with Thompson Rivers University of Canada in which a student of 4 year Bachelor's degree program here after studying for 2 years, can complete rest 2 years in Canada and also get 3 year work permit in Canada. The building is situated in bathinda - dabwali road. MRSPTU is also fit for central assistance under section 12(B).
