= Majha =

Area of the historical Punjab region

- Cultural region of Punjab
- Map
- Named for: mañjhlā ("middle")

Majha (romanized: Mājhā; Punjabi pronunciation: [mäˑ˩˥.dʒˑäː]; from mañjhlā 'middle') (Note: Punjabi: ਮਾਝਾ (Gurmukhi), ماجھا (Shahmukhi)) is a region located in the central parts of the historical Punjab region, presently split between the republics of Pakistan and India. It extends north from the right banks (Note: The left/right bank of a river is determined by looking in the direction of flow of the river (facing downstream).) of the Beas River, and reaches as far north as left bank of the Ravi River.

The Majha region was partitioned between India and Pakistan in 1947. It includes four districts of Indian state of Punjab — Amritsar, Tarn Taran, Gurdaspur, and Pathankot. In the Pakistani province of Punjab, the Majha region proper includes Lahore and Kasur districts. However, it is not uncommon to include the districts of Gujranwala (including Hafizabad and Wazirabad), Sialkot (including Narowal) and Sheikhupura (including Nankana Sahib) — located in the Upper Rachna Doab — in the Majha area as well. Strictly speaking, though, the northeastern half of Rachna Doab is traditionally called Darap, and the southwestern half forms part of the Sandal Bar. Even the southwestern half of Lahore district has a separate name, Nakka. Taken as a whole, Majha forms a rough parallelogram with the rivers Beas and Sutlej forming the base and bounded by the Sivaliks in the east, the River Chenab in the north, and roughly the line of 73°-30'East longitude in the west.

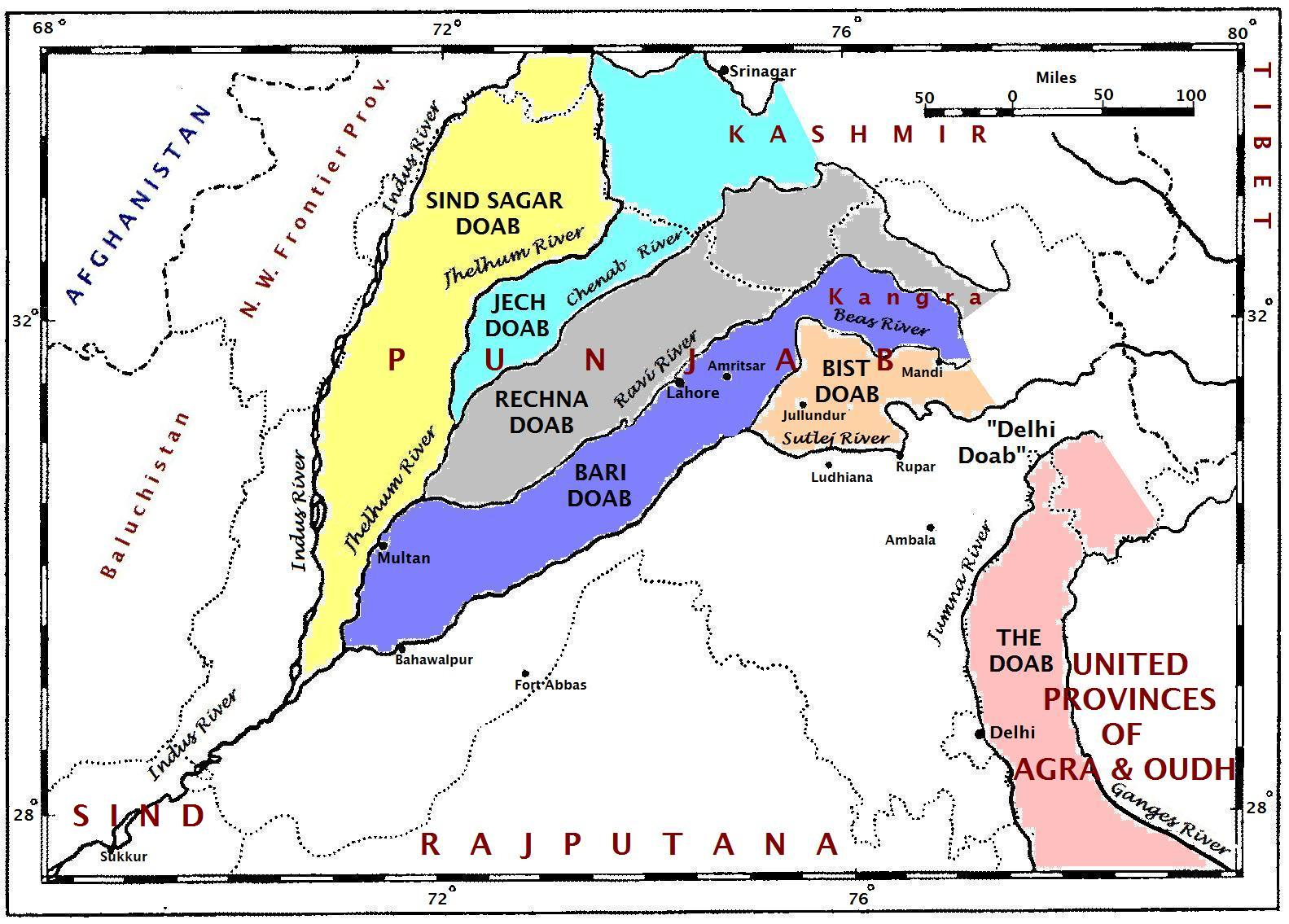
A map of the Punjab region c. 1947 showing the different doabs.

People of the Majha region are given the demonym "Mājhī" or "Majhail". Most inhabitants of the region speak the Majhi dialect, which is the basis of the standard register of the Punjabi language in Indian Punjab. The most populous city in the area is Lahore on the Pakistani side, and Amritsar on the Indian side of the border. Majha is also the birthplace of Sikhism.

== Etymology ==
The word majha means "middle" or "central".

== Geography and culture ==
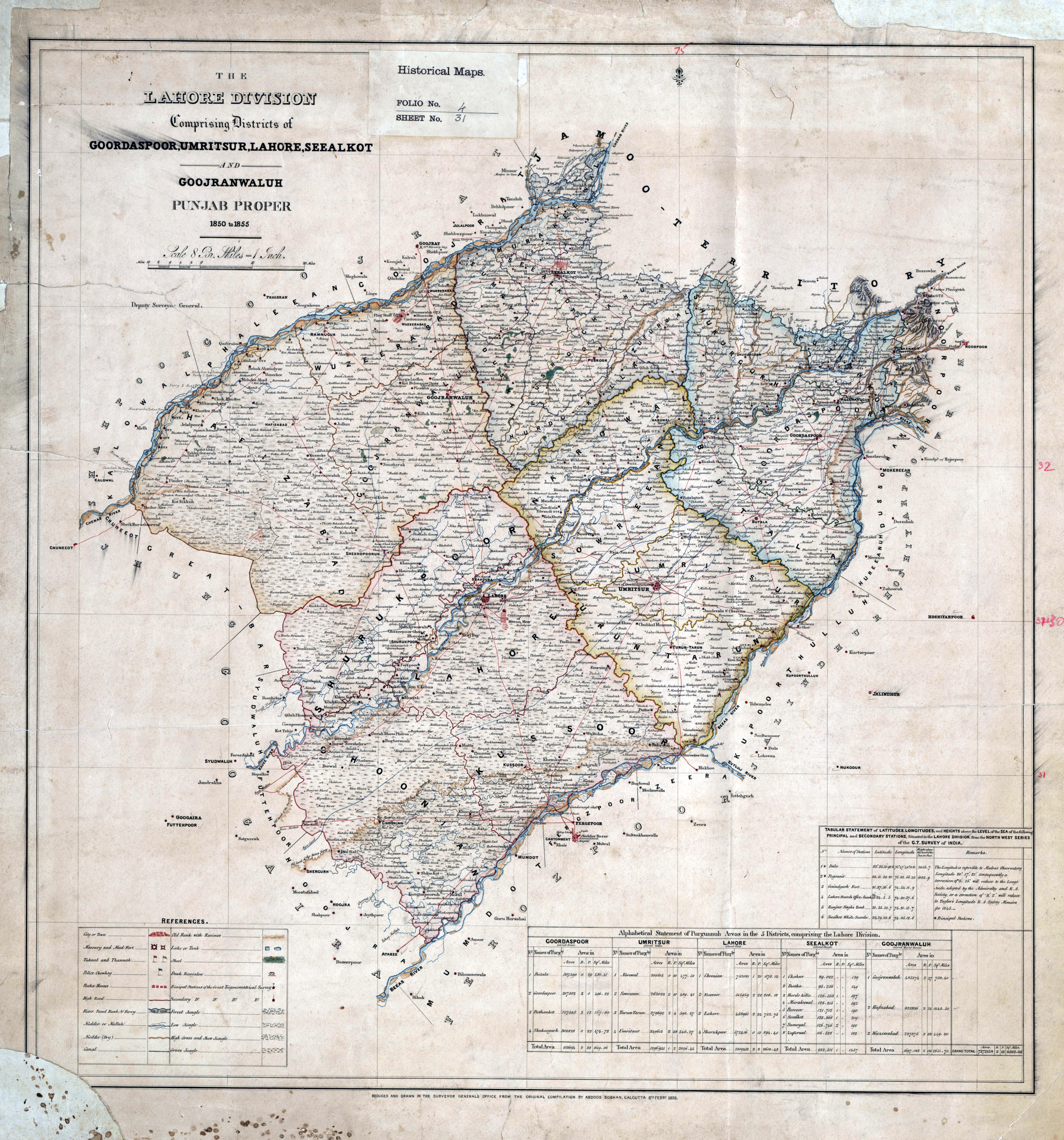
Map of the Lahore Division in 1850–1855, comprising the Districts of Gurdaspur, Amritsar, Lahore, Sialkot, and Gujranwala, usually included in the Majha region.

Majha is defined as the tract of land between the Ravi and Beas rivers, being north of the Sutlej River, after the confluence of Beas and Sutlej at Harike, and up until the Ravi River, expending in Pakistani Punjab until the Jhelum river. The Majha region includes four districts of the Indian state of Punjab — Amritsar, Tarn Taran, Gurdaspur, and Pathankot and the districts of Lahore and Kasur in the Pakistani province of Punjab in the Bari Doab. However, it is not uncommon to include the districts of Gujranwala (including Hafizabad and Wazirabad), Sialkot (including Narowal) and Sheikhupura (including Nankana Sahib) — located in the Upper Rachna Doab — in the Majha area as well.Strictly speaking, though, the northeastern half of Rachna Doab is traditionally called Darap, and the southwestern half forms part of the Sandal Bar. Even the southwestern half of Lahore district has a separate name, Nakka. Taken as a whole, Majha forms a rough parallelogram with the rivers Beas and Sutlej forming the base and bounded by the Sivaliks in the east, the River Chenab in the north, and roughly the line of 73°-30'East longitude in the west.

The Majha region is called the "Sword Arm of the Country", due to it contributing disproportionately to the officer as well as orderly ranks of the armies of both India and Pakistan. The Sikh Empire was founded in the Majha region, and so the region is also sometimes referred to as "the cradle of the brave Sikhs".

== History ==
There is a lack of a river boundary between Amritsar and Lahore, leading to the formation of a shared, cultural zone. Later, this area expanded to include the regions of Gujranwala, Sheikhupura, and Sialkot which lay beyond the Ravi river due to Ranjit Singh forming a polity with these core territories. Much of the region was under the Sikh Empire. Further regional consolidation occurred with improved transport infrastructure during colonial-rule, such as the construction of bridges. Frequent travel and contact existed within the region but the partition of Punjab in 1947 created a new border which split the region in two and ended intra-regional movement.

== Tourist attractions ==
- Wagah-Attari border ceremony, border ceremony between India and Pakistan

=== India ===
- List of tourist attractions in Amritsar
- Gurdwara Sri Tarn Taran Sahib, Tarn Taran
- Harike Pattan bird sanctuary, Tarn Taran
- Ranjit Sagar Dam, Pathankot

=== Pakistan ===
- List of tourist attractions in Lahore
- Gurdwara Darbar Sahib Kartarpur, Kartarpur
- Gurdwara Janam Asthan, Nankana Sahib
- Hiran Minar, Sheikhupura
- Changa Manga forest, Kasur

== Photo gallery ==
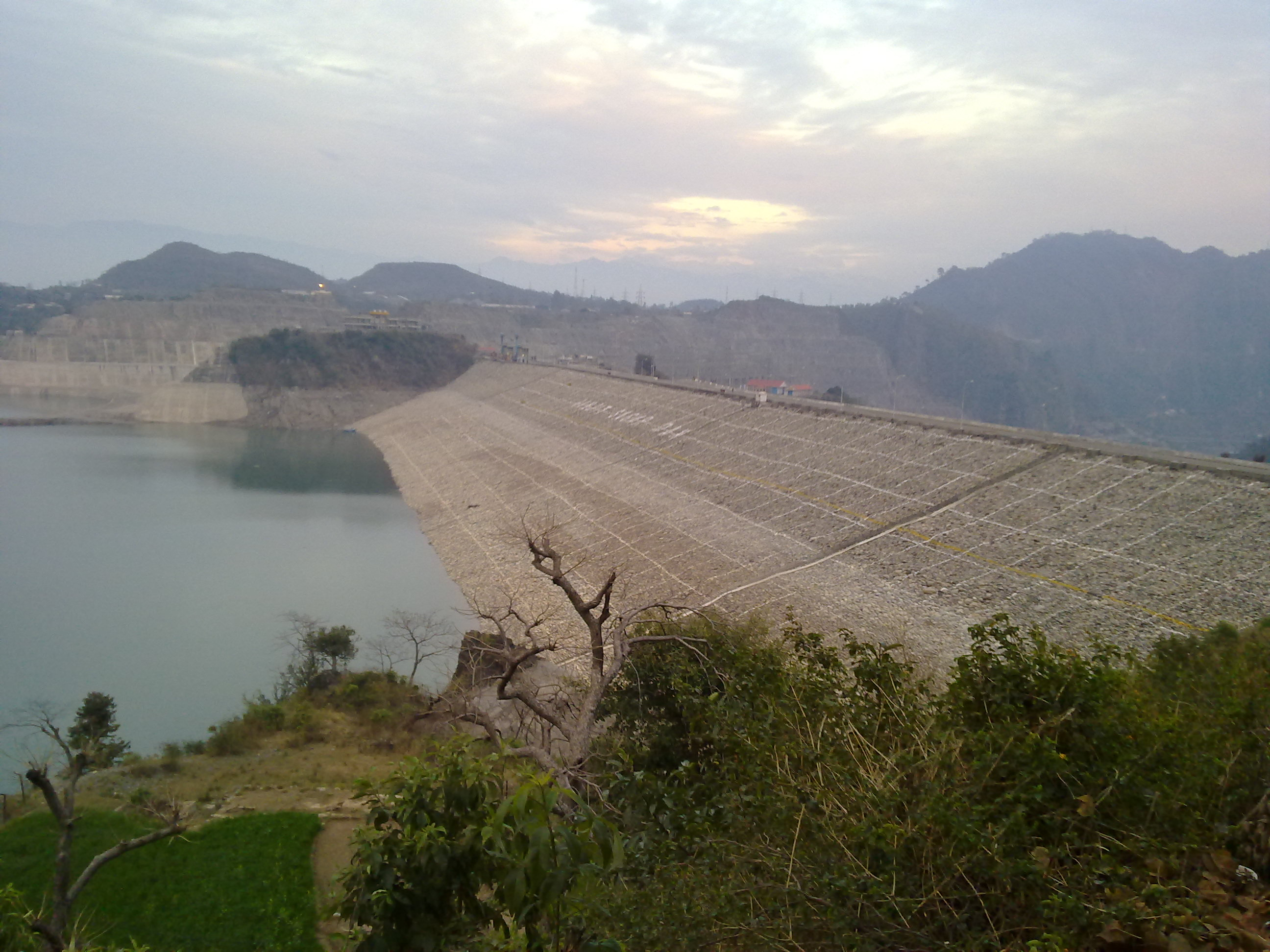
Ranjit Sagar Dam, Shahpur Kandi

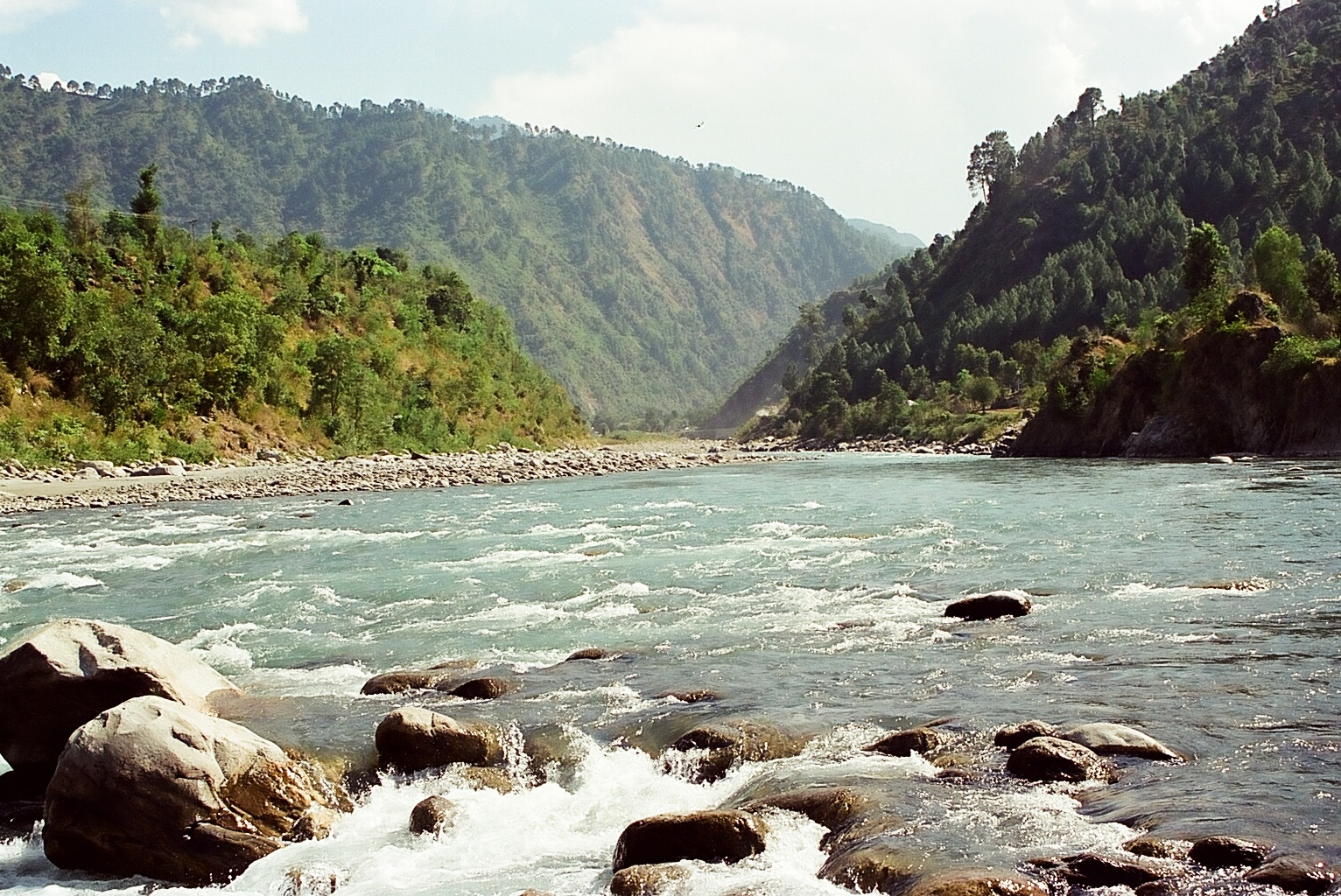
Ravi River

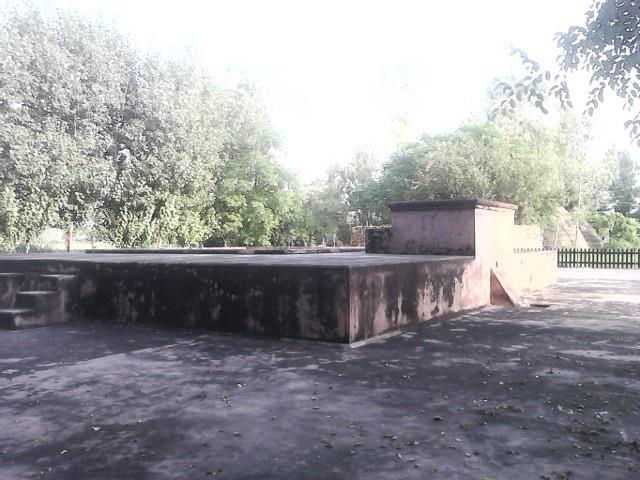
Emperor Akbar crowning platform, Kalanaur, Gurdaspur

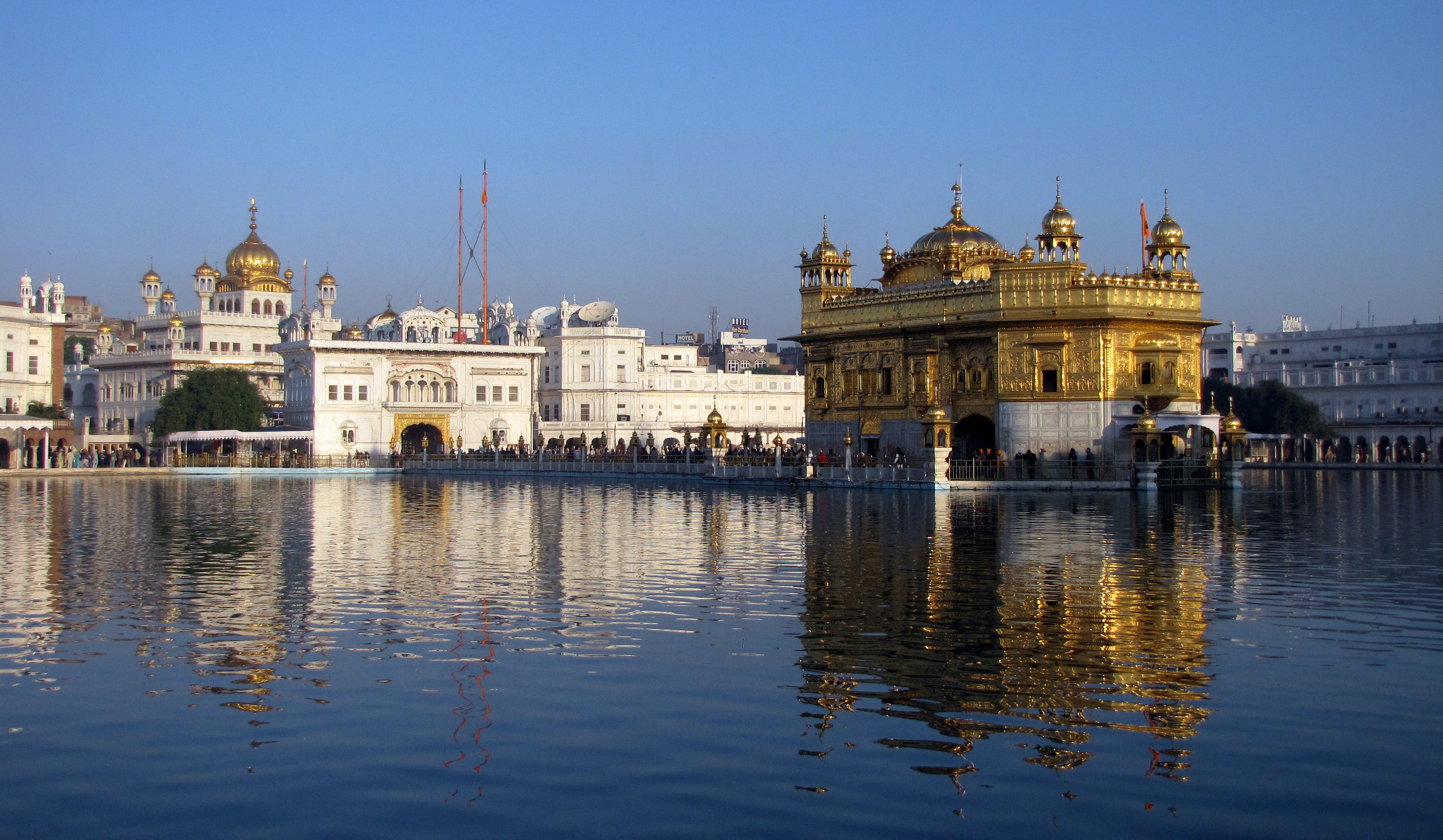
Golden Temple and the Akal Takht, Amritsar

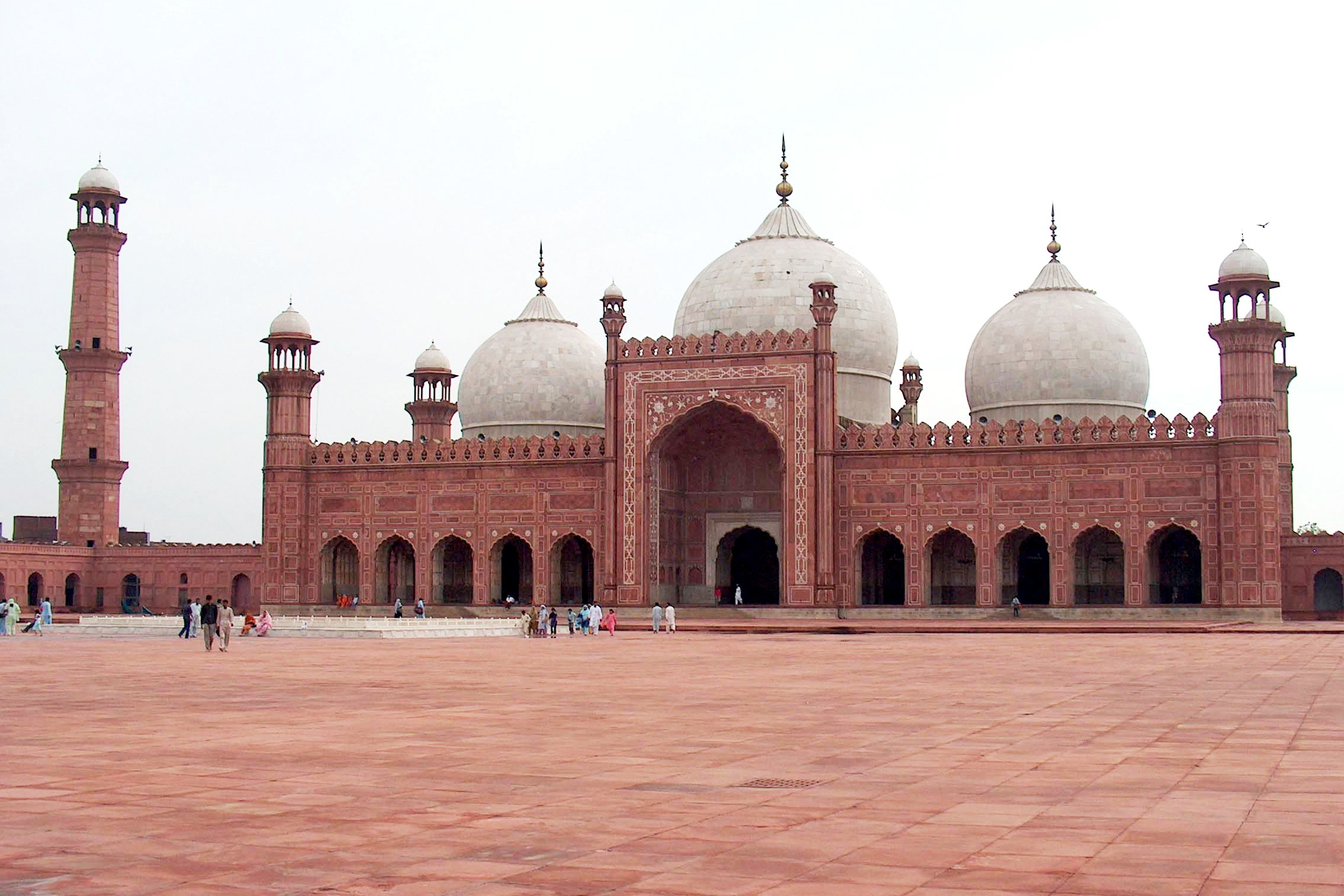
Badshahi Mosque, Lahore

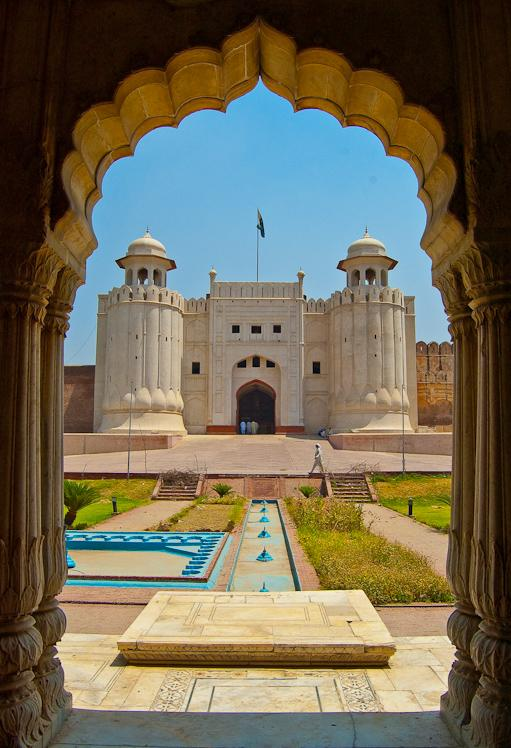
Lahore Fort, Lahore

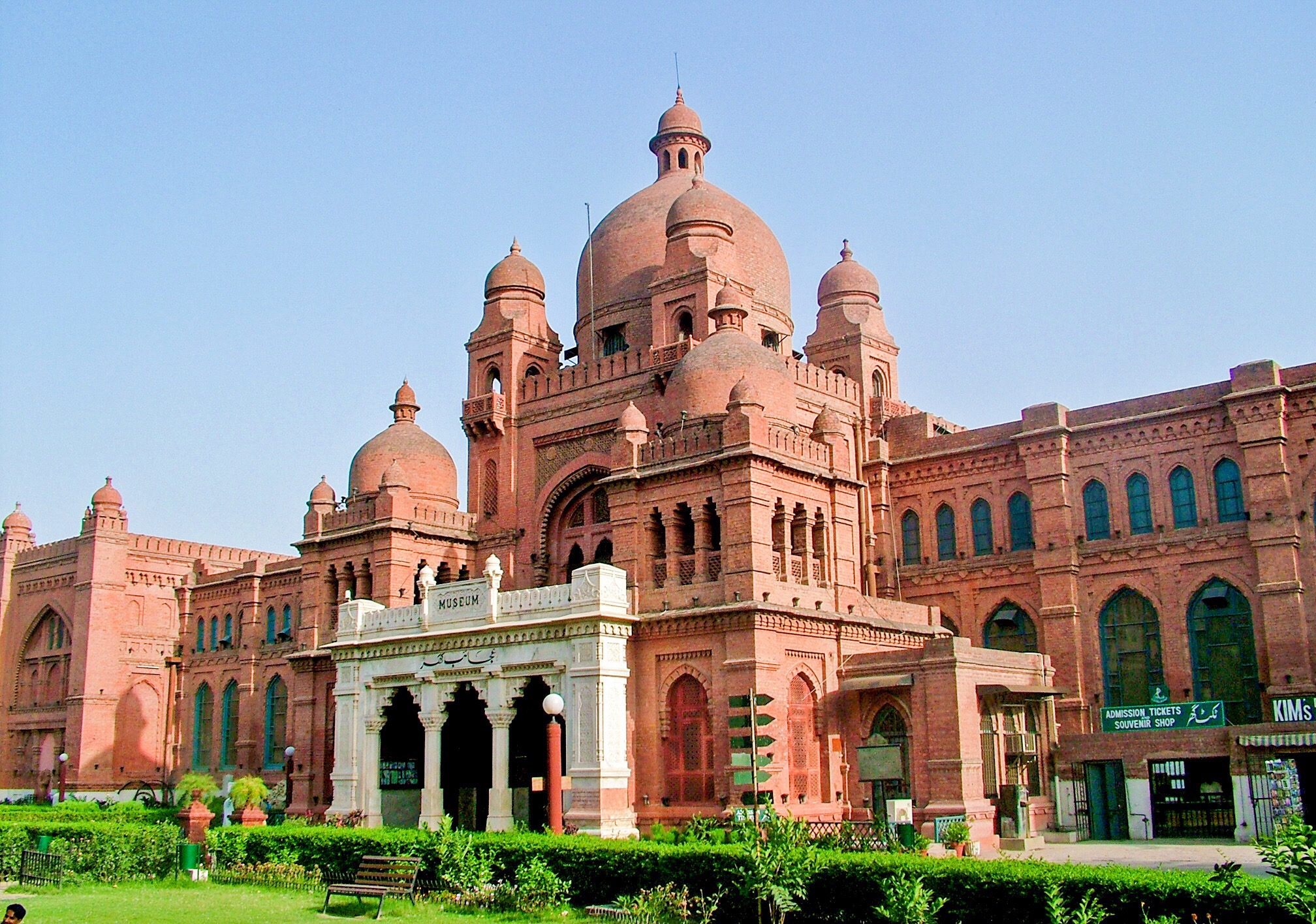
Lahore Museum, Lahore

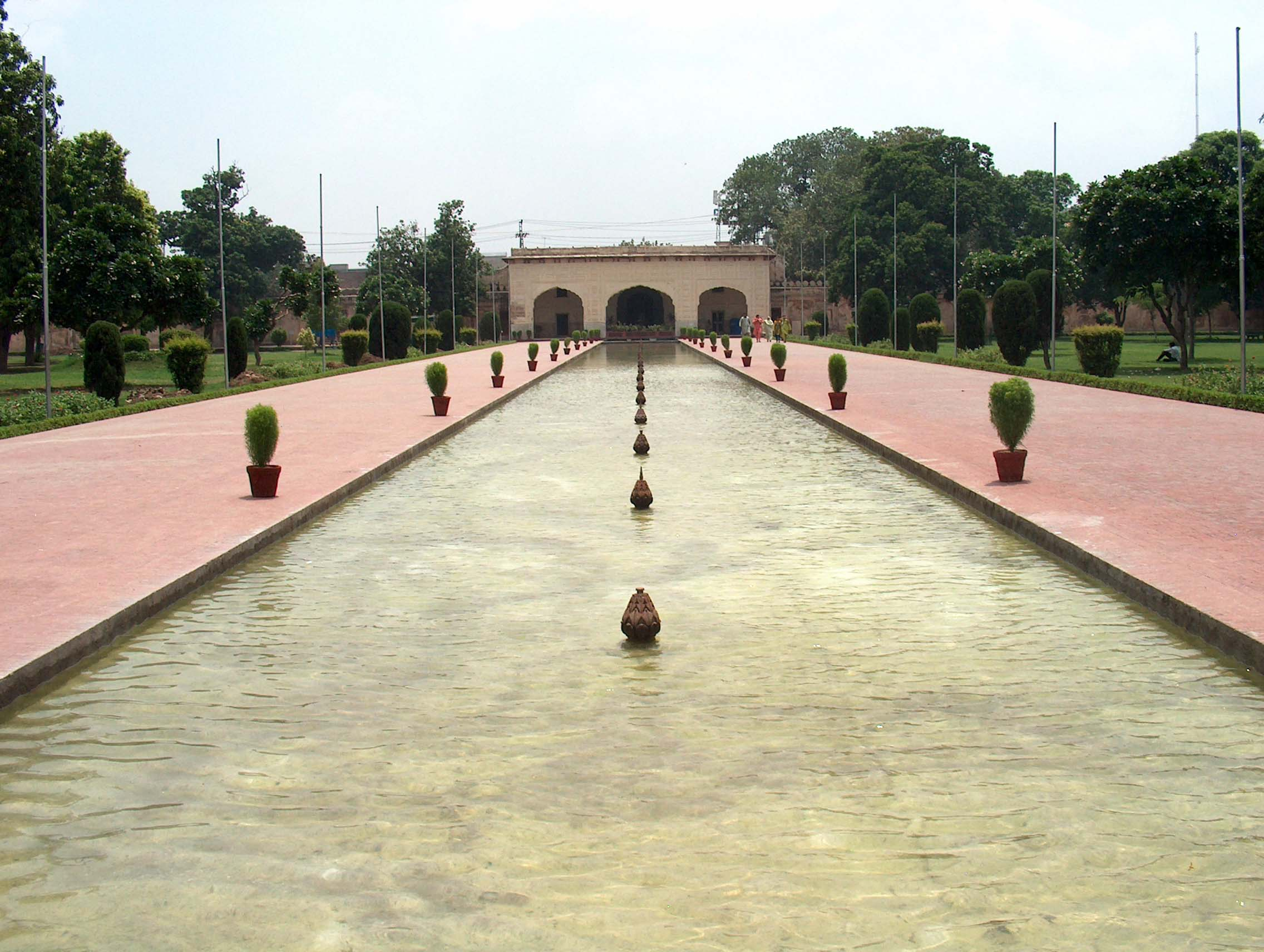
Shalamar Gardens, Lahore

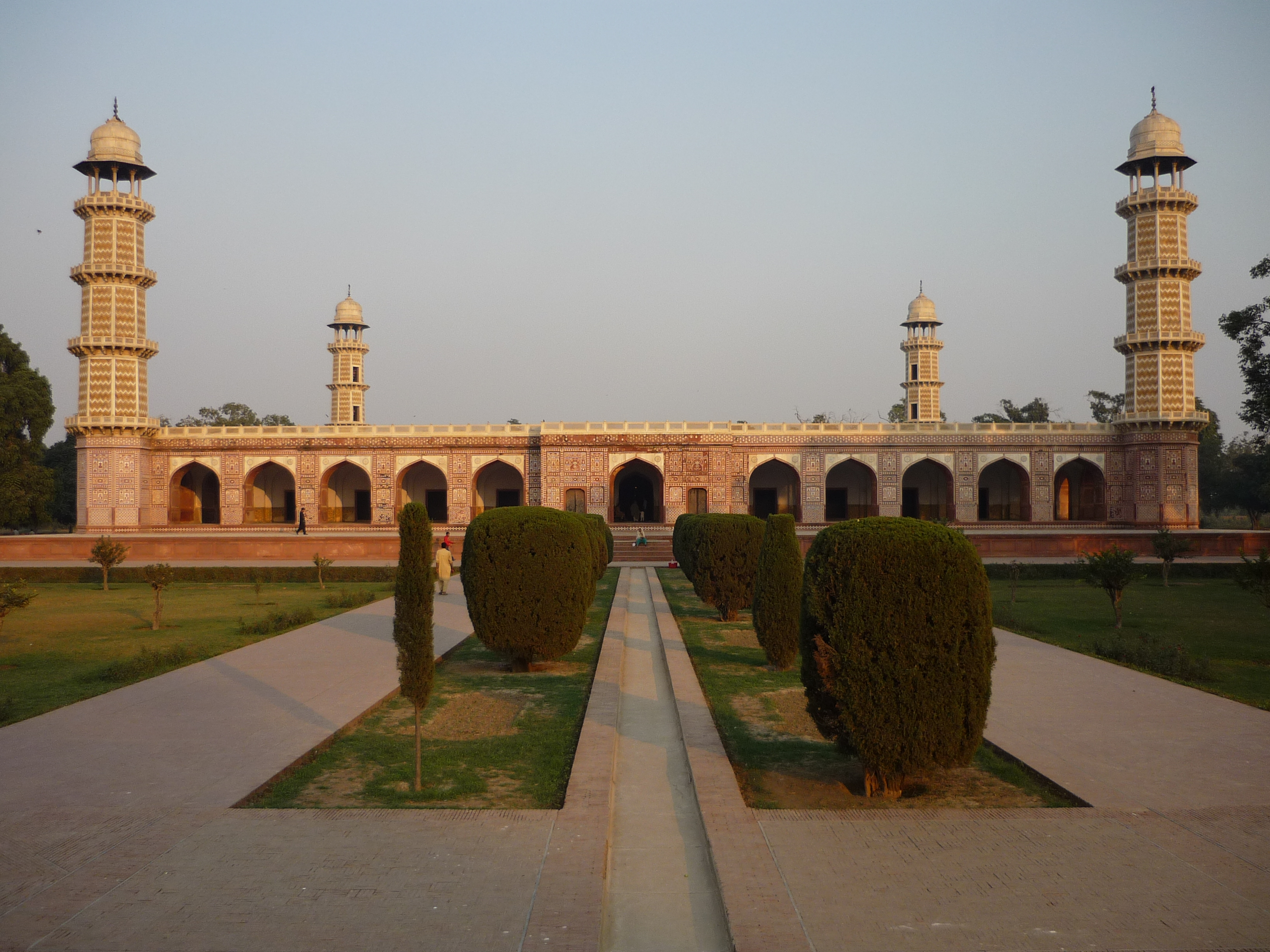
Tomb of Jahangir, Lahore

== See also ==
- Doaba, cultural region in Punjab, India
- Bar, cultural region in Punjab, Pakistan
- Pothwar, cultural region in Punjab, Pakistan
- Malwa, cultural region in Punjab, India
- Poadh, cultural region in India
- The Punjab Doabs, geographic regions in Punjab
