= Bhagwan Valmiki Tirath Sthal =

Ashram of the great Sage Maharishi Valmiki

Valmiki Ashram
- ਭਗਵਾਨ ਵਾਲਮੀਕੀ ਤੀਰਥ ਅਸਥਾਨ; Bhagwan Valmiki Tirath Asthan भगवान वाल्मीकि तीर्थ स्थल
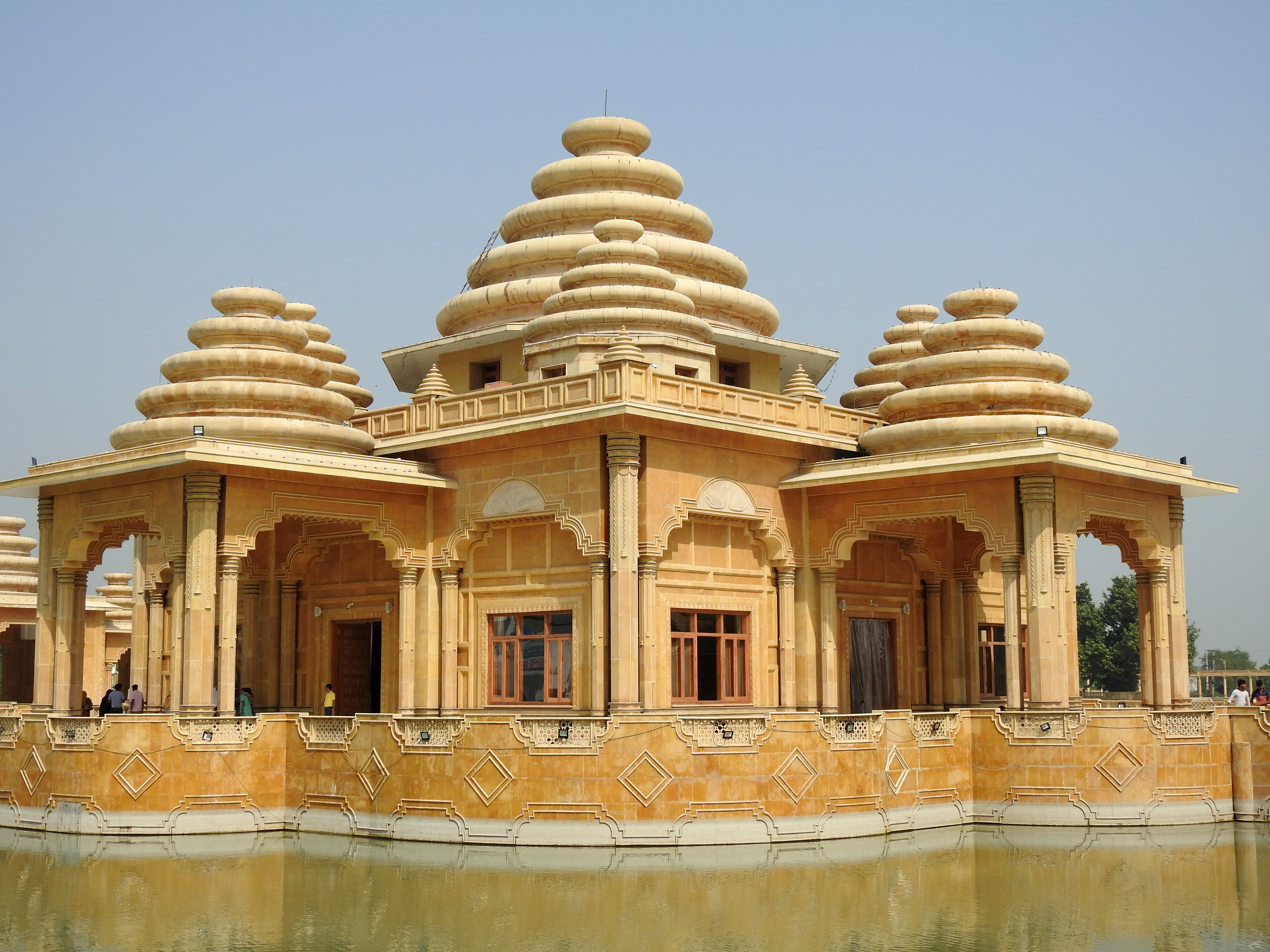
- Bhagwan Valmiki Tirath Asthan/Ram Tirath Mandir

Religion
- Affiliation: Hinduism
- District: Amritsar
- Deity: Valmiki
- Governing body: Government of Punjab, India

Location
- Location: Bhagwan Valmiki Tirath Road, Amritsar, Punjab, India
- State: Punjab
- Interactive map of Valmiki Ashram

Architecture
- Style: Hindu
- Completed: 1 December 2016

Bhagwan Valmiki Tirath Asthan is temple panorama complex and an important historical monument of Valmikis located at Bhagwan Valmiki Tirath road of Amritsar city. Since 1 December 2016, it has an 8-foot-tall 800-kg gold-plated murti of Sage Valmiki in main section. Formerly known as Ram Tirath, the location was renamed after Balmiki in 2016, a sign of the successful appropriation and reclamation of the site by the Balmiki community.

== Mythology ==
Bhagwan Valmiki Tirath Asthan, dedicated to Valmiki, is situated 11 km west of Amritsar on Amritsar Lopoke road. As per regional tradition, the Hindu temple dates back to the period of the events of the epic Ramayana, identified as the location of the ashram of the sage. According to legend, this is the site where the sage gave shelter to Sita, wife of Rama, after the deity decided that she not return to Ayodhya. The place is also considered to be the birthplace of Lava and Kusha, the twin sons of Rama.

== Management ==
Bhagwan Valmiki Tirath Asthan is managed and maintained by Valmiki Tirath Development Board. There was dispute regarding the management of site between Mahant Baldev Giri and Mahant Malkeet Nath of the Bhagwan Valmiki Dhuna Sahib Management Trust. In 2013, Punjab Police was deployed at the site, due to tension between Mahants and Valmikis. On 9 September 2014, Punjab government failed to restore the possession of Dhuna Sahib and two other sites at the ancient shrine to mahant Baldev Giri on court orders. On 11 September 2014, Police with the help of Border Security Force broker a compromise between the two parties.

== Development ==
Foundation stone of Bhagwan Valmiki Tirath Asthan was laid on 18 October 2016 and this project was designed by Department of Architecture of Guru Nanak Dev University. It was inaugurated on 1 December 2016 by the Chief Minister of Punjab. The historic site was renovated with ₹200 crore (US$21 million) and has entrance portals at both ends, a sacred pond, circumambulation with a bridge, a devotee hall with capacity of 5000, a Sanskrit library, a museum and a multi-storey modern car parking with a capacity of 500 four-wheeler vehicles.

== Gallery ==
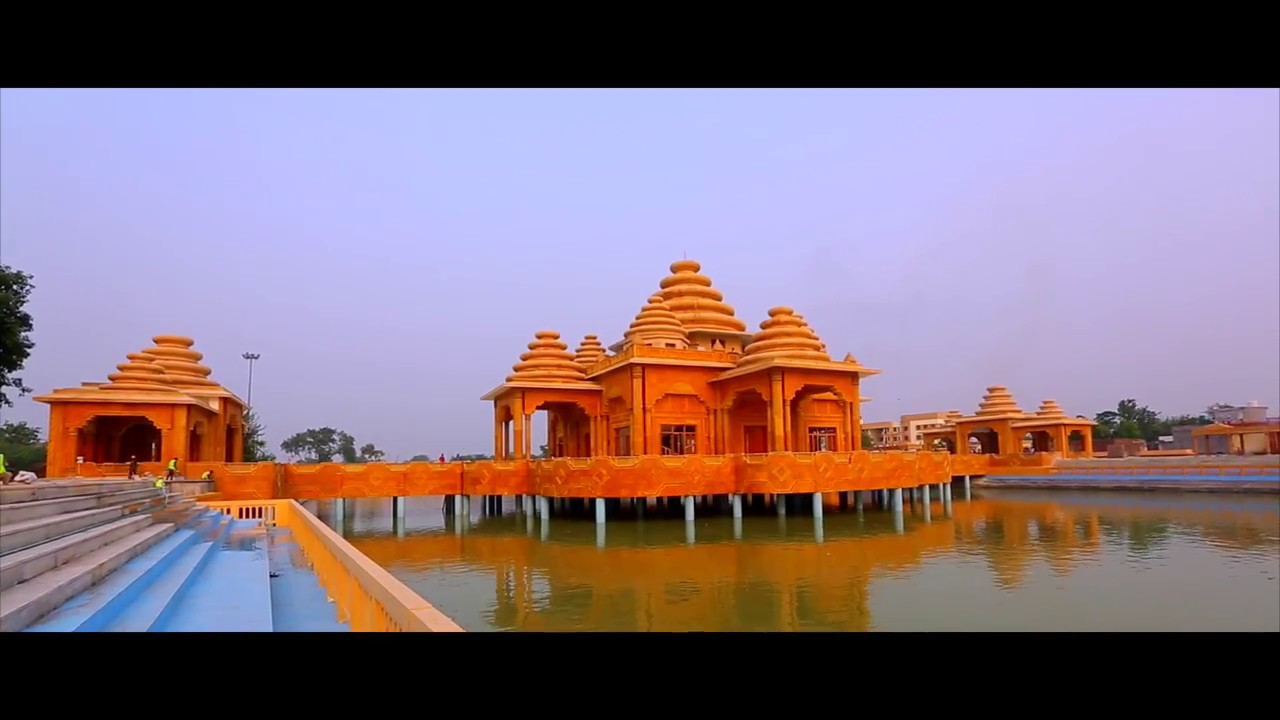
Lord Valmiki temple cum panorama complex

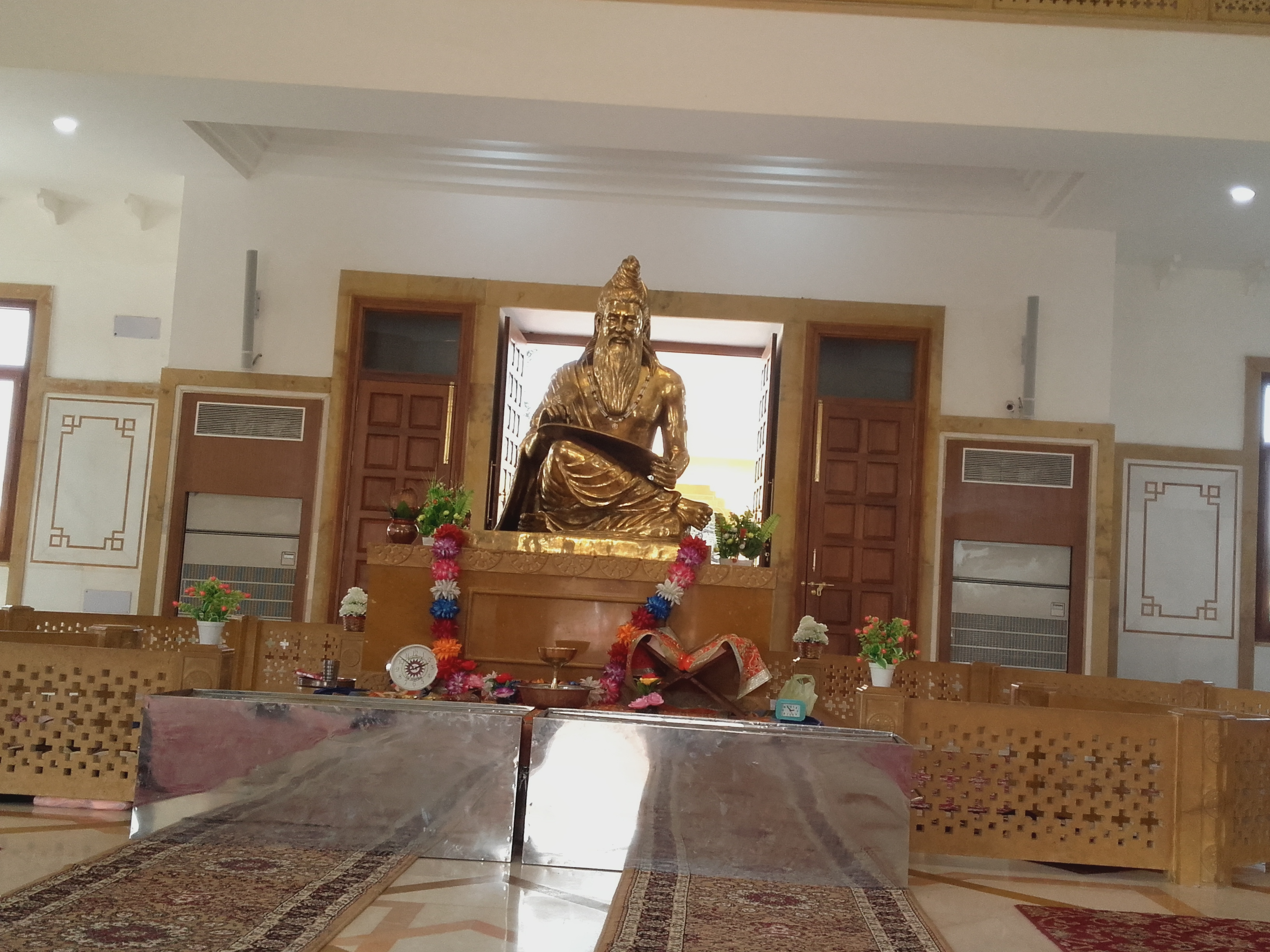
8 feet tall gold plated idol of Lord Valmiki

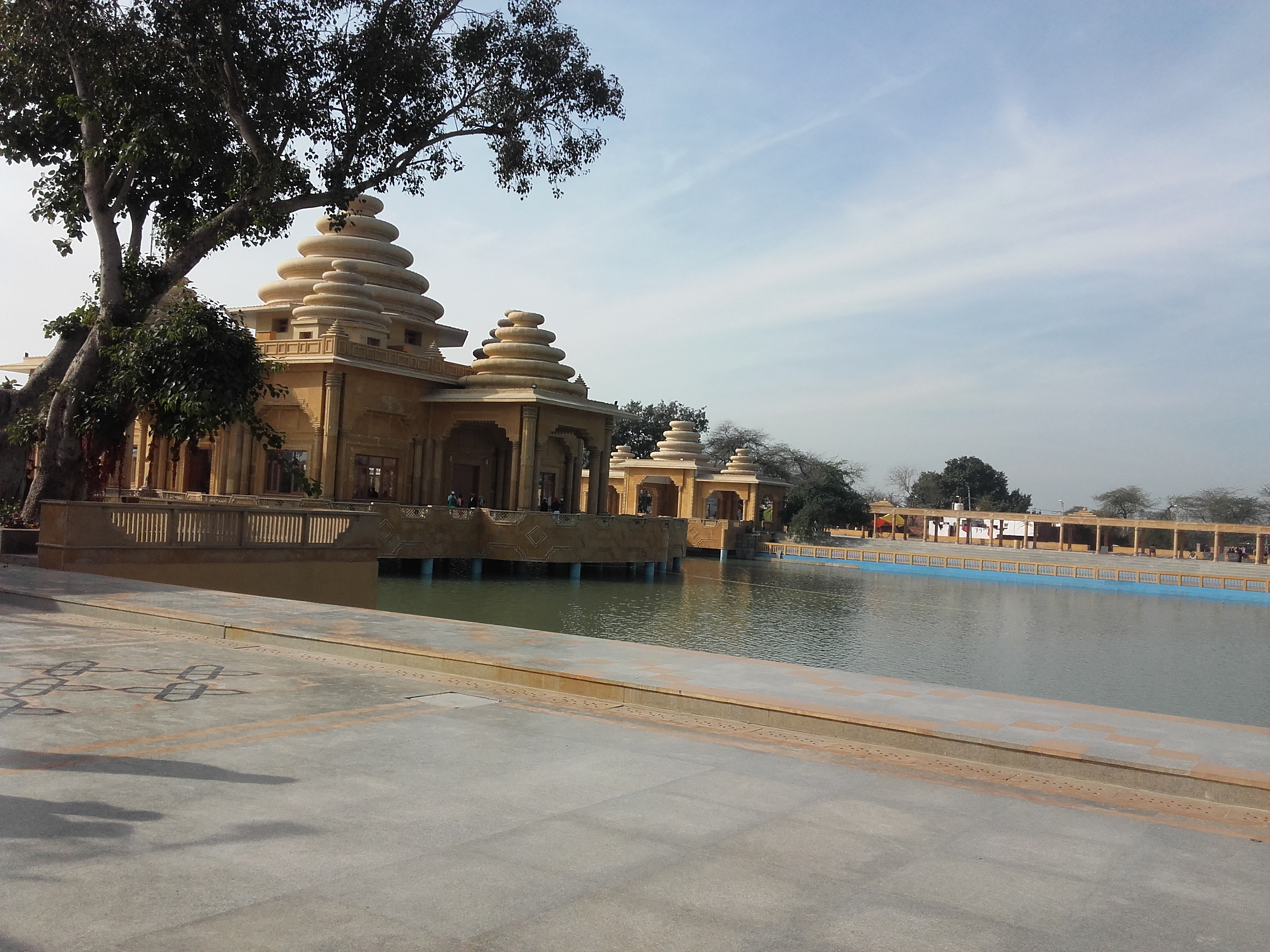
a view of Bhagwan Valmiki Tirath Sthal

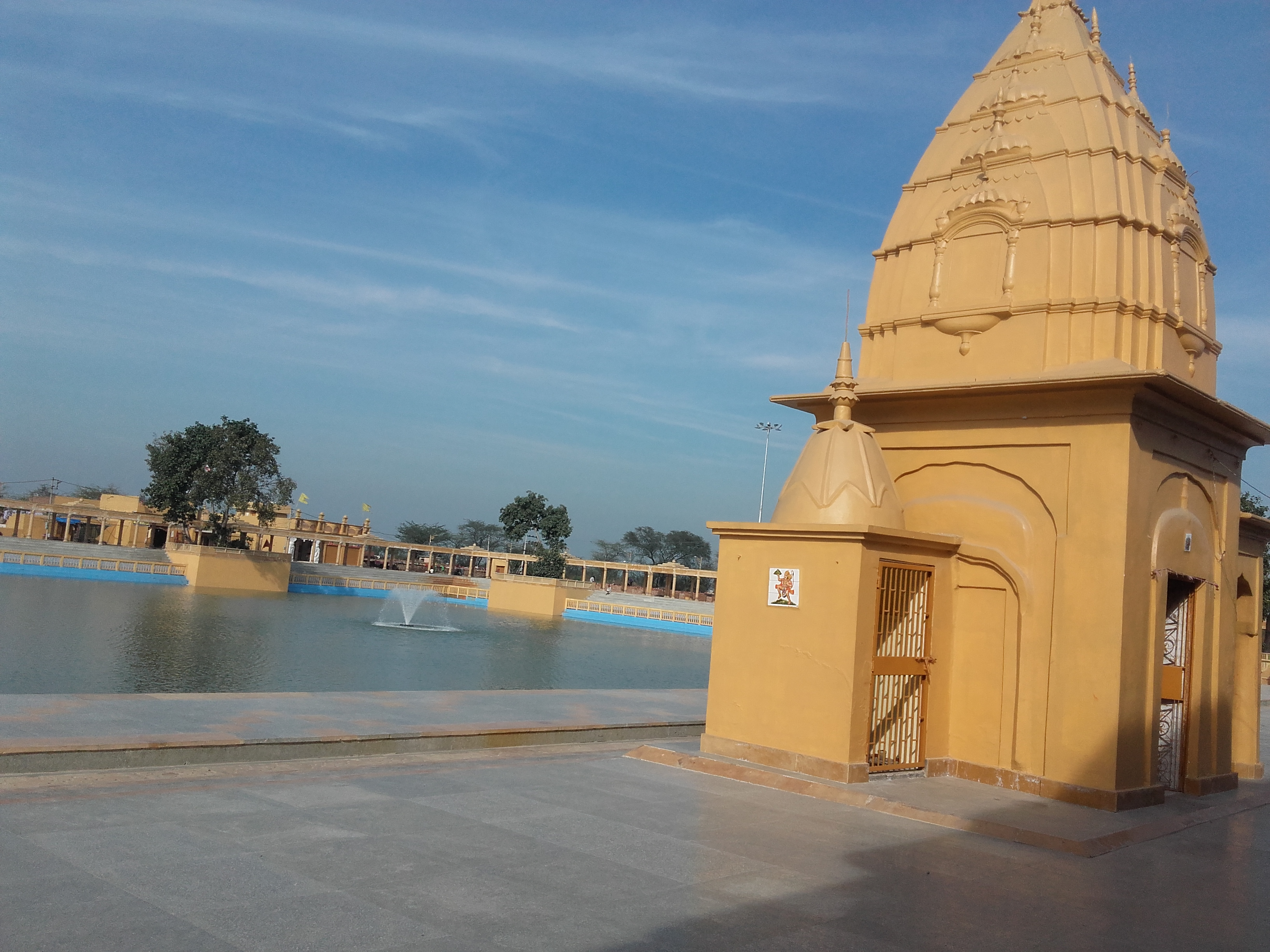
Sacred pond at Temple

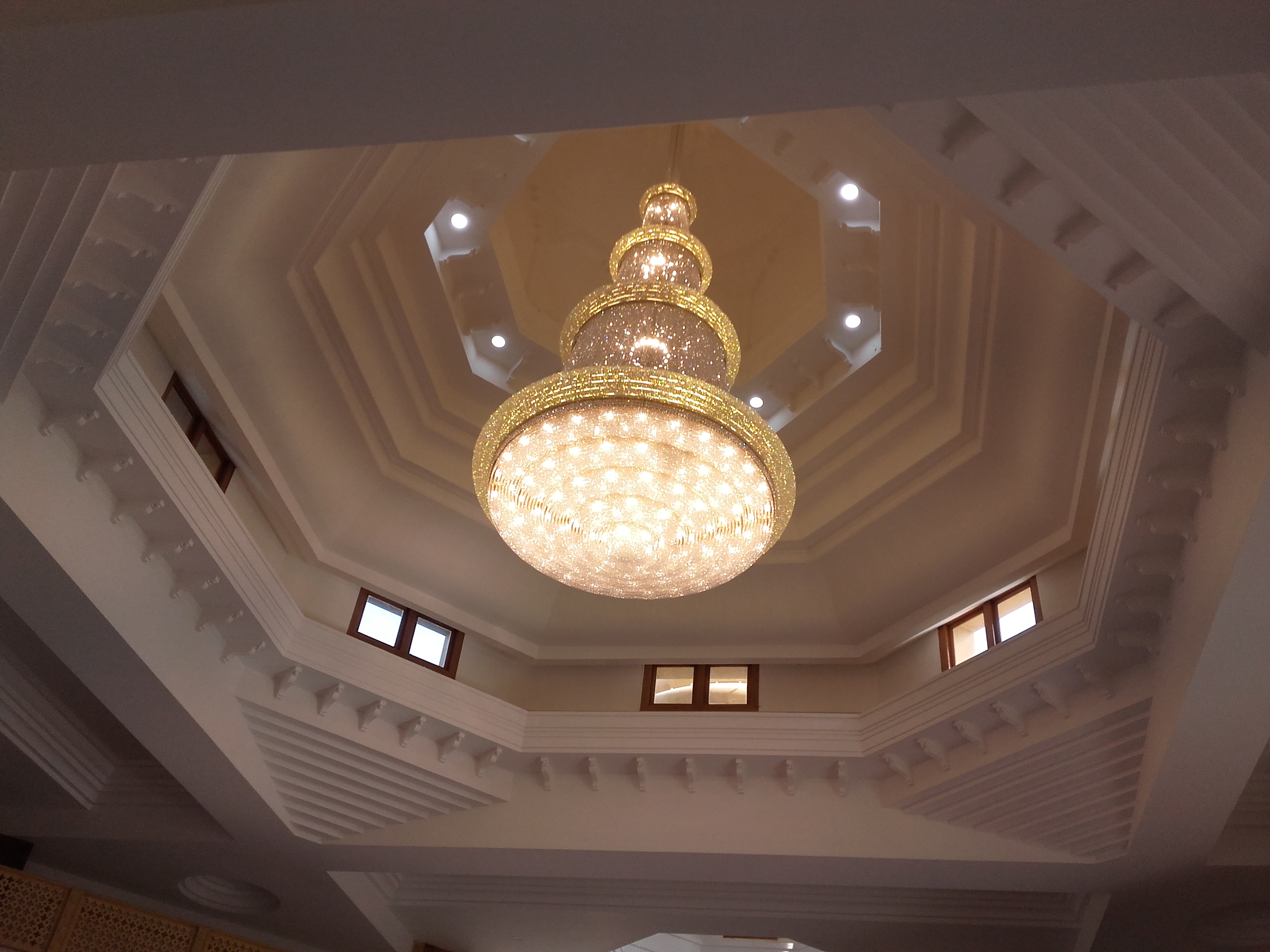
Chandelier inside main area of Temple

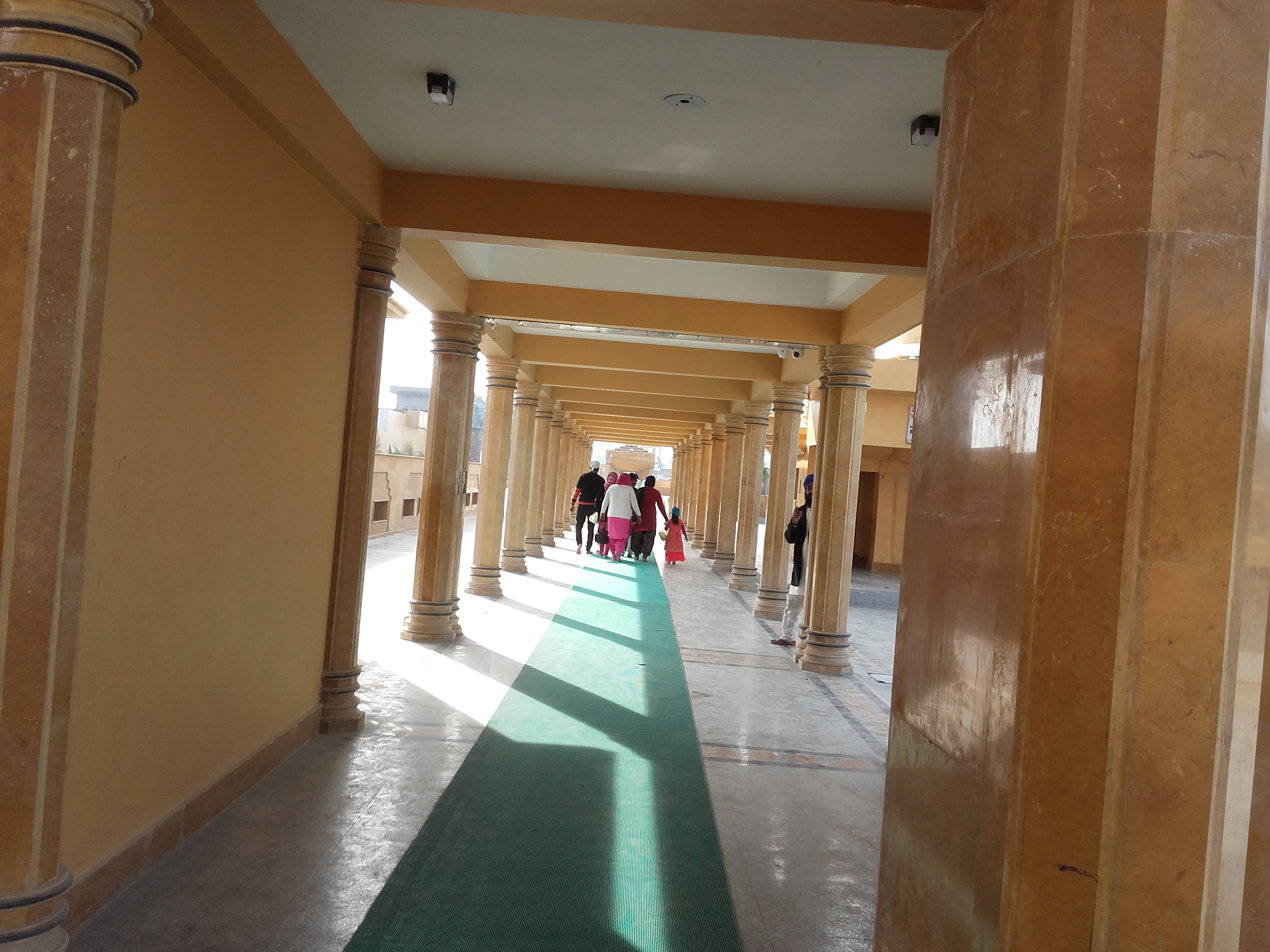
Hallway surrounding the Temple

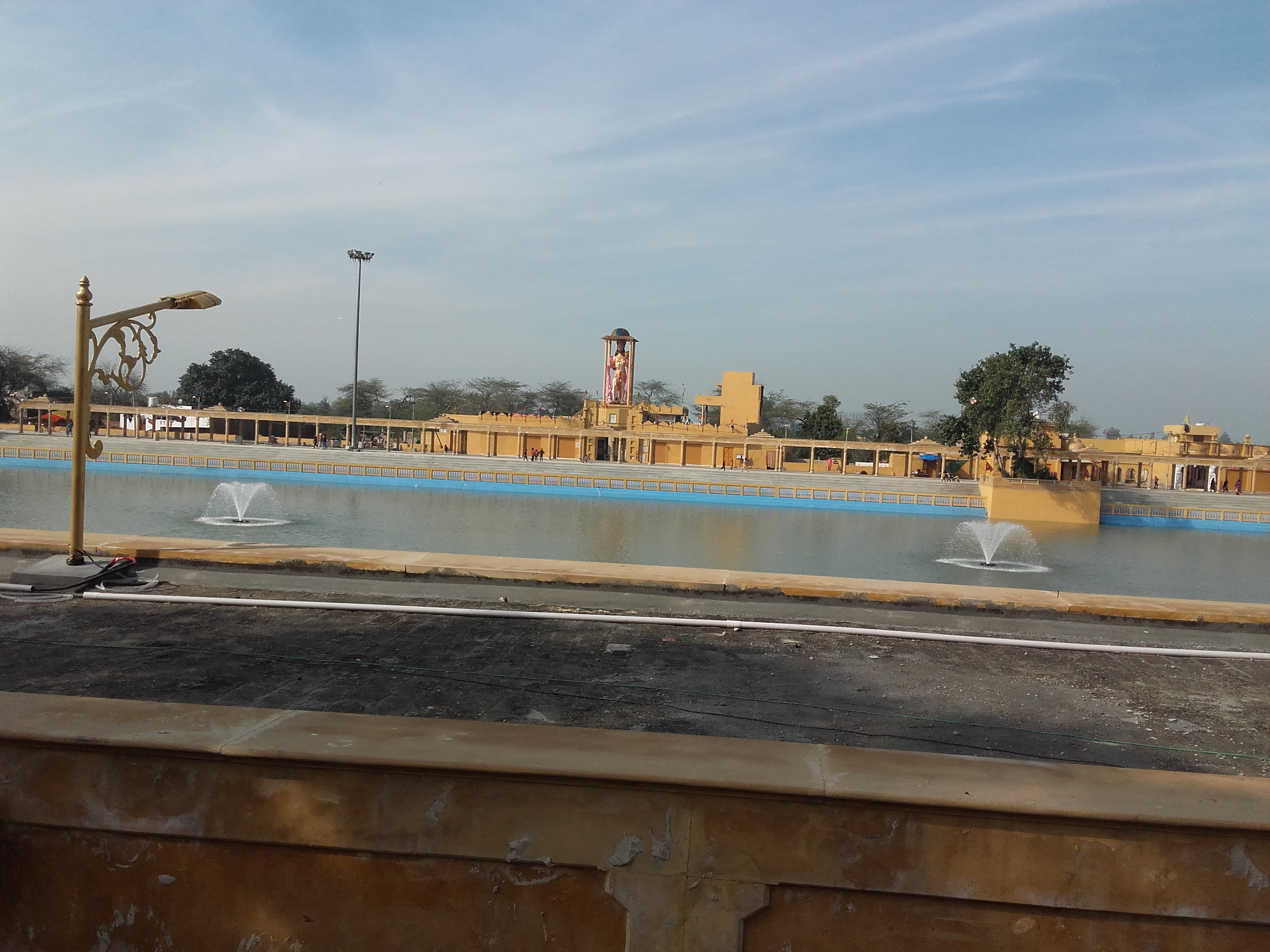
a view of Temple tank

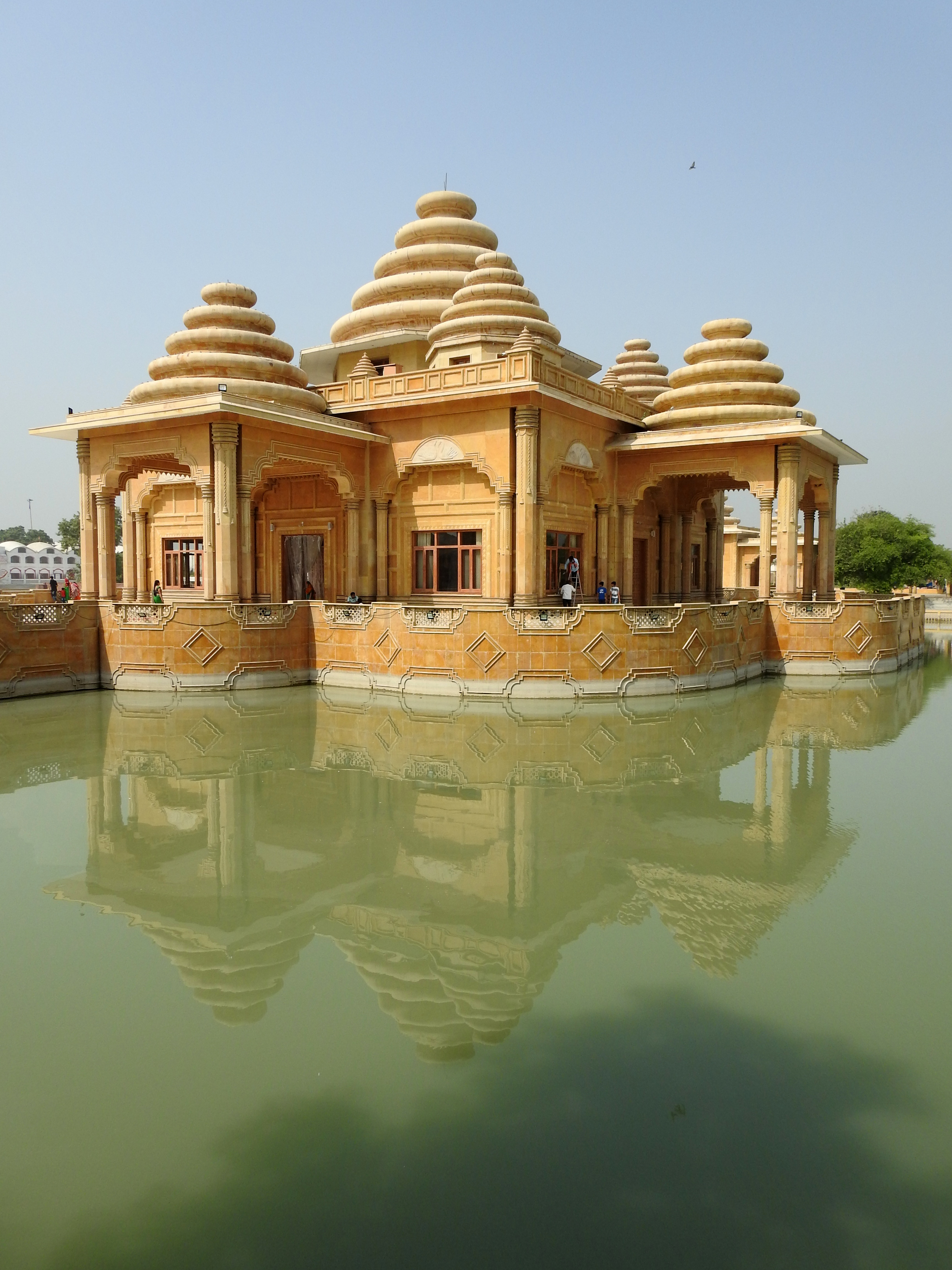
Bhagwan Valmiki Tirath Sthal, temple

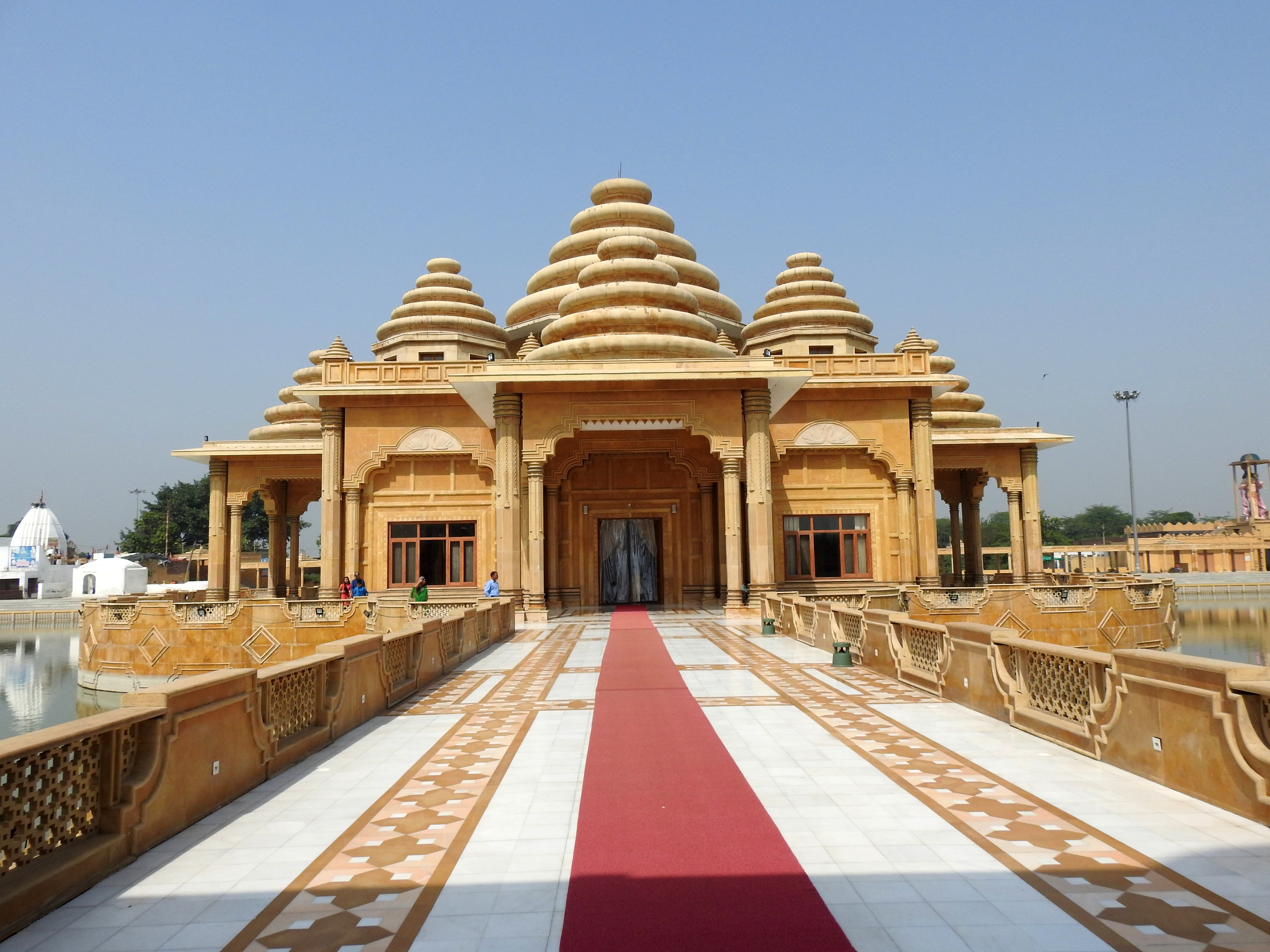
Bhagwan Valmiki Tirath Sthal, temple

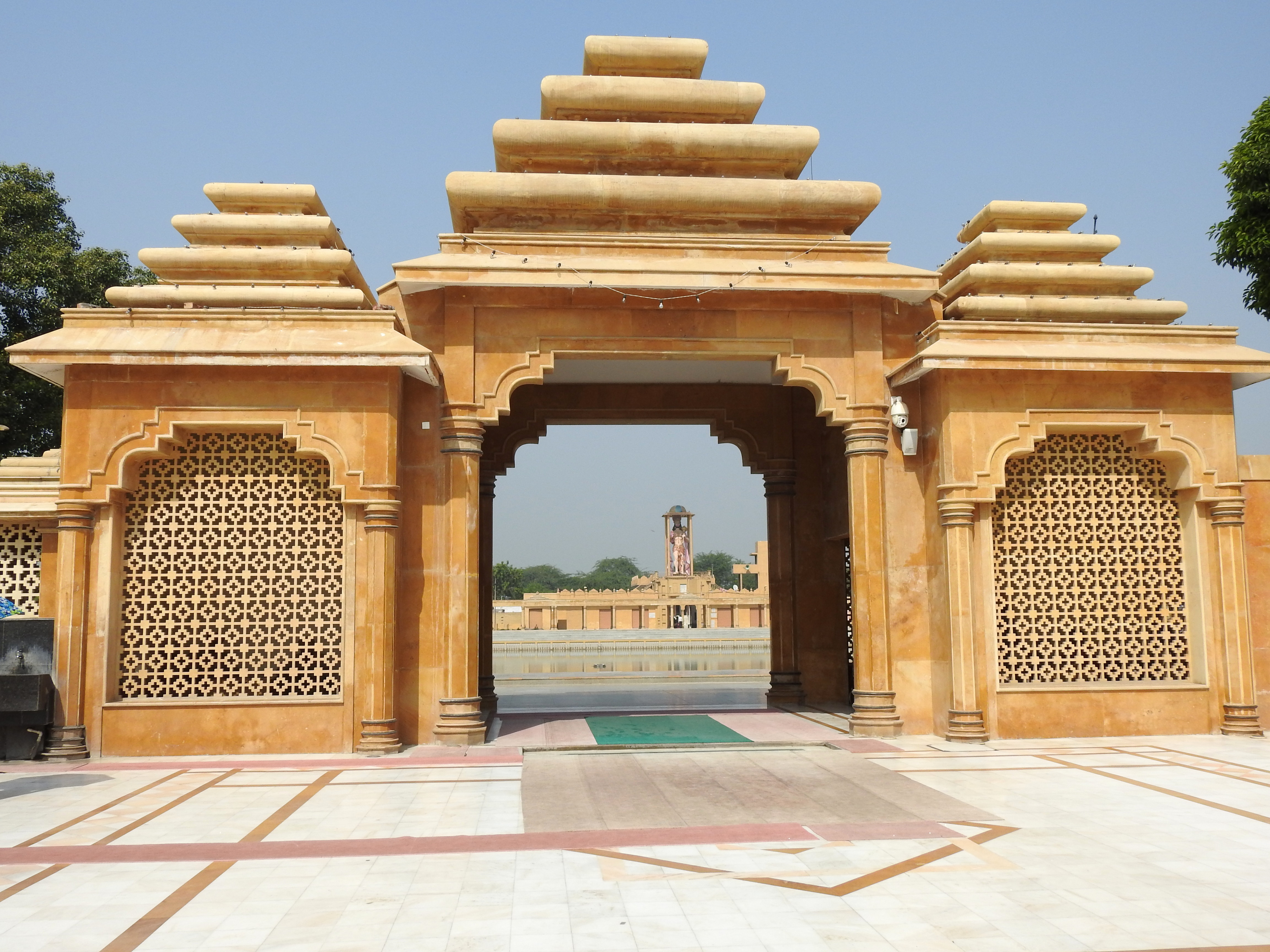
Bhagwan Valmiki Tirath Sthal, temple

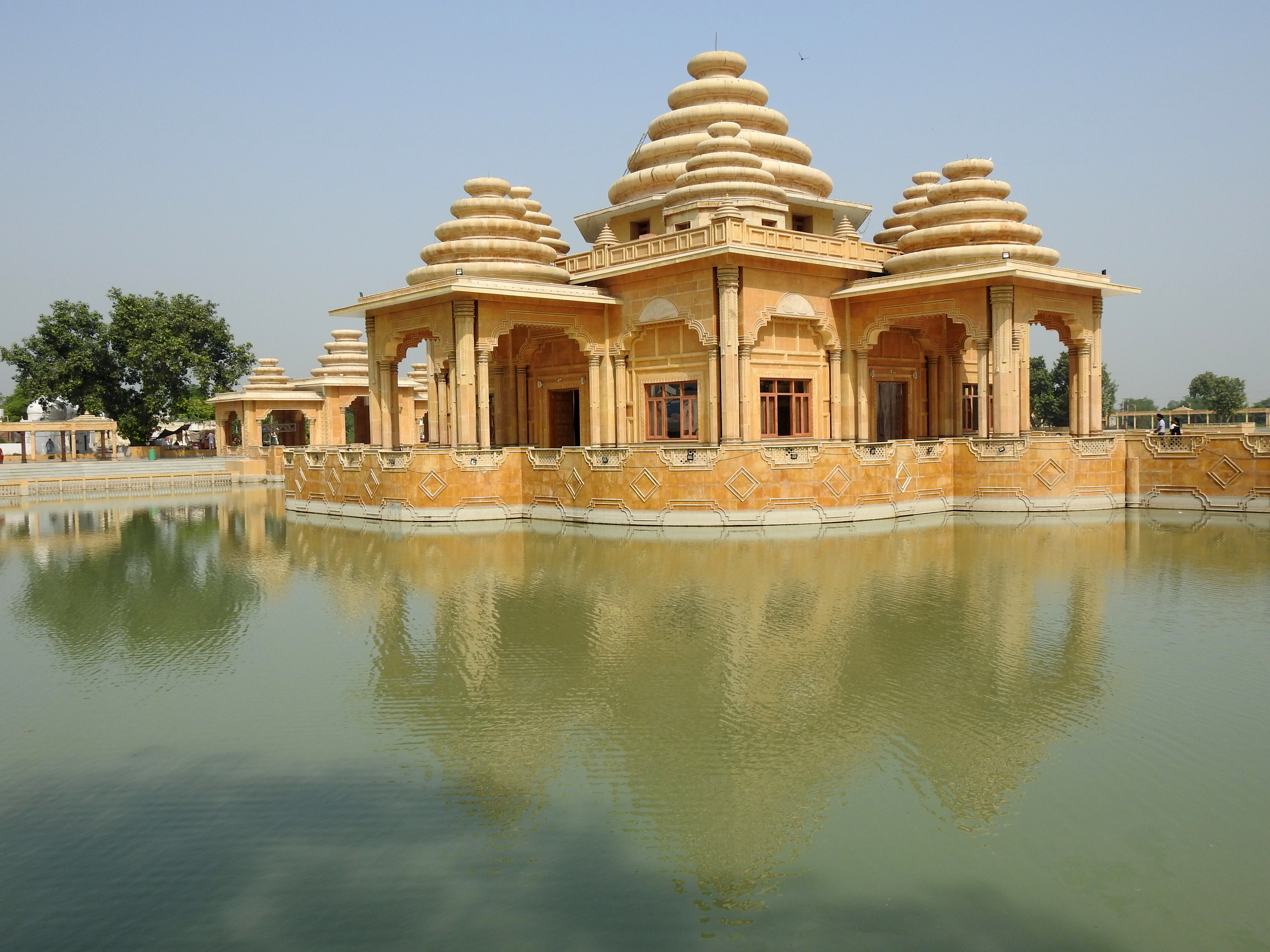
Bhagwan Valmiki Tirath Sthal, temple

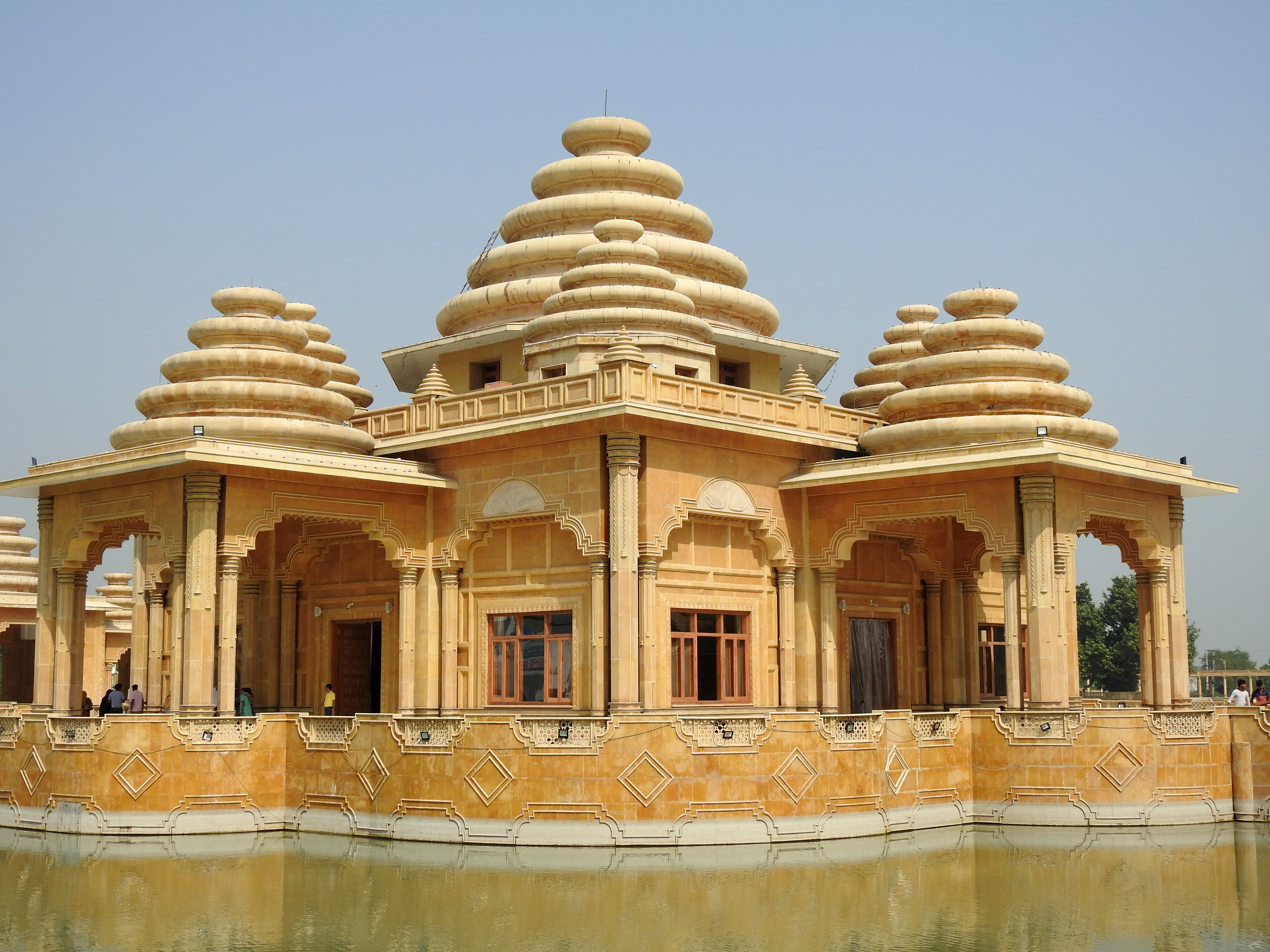
Bhagwan Valmiki Tirath Sthal, temple

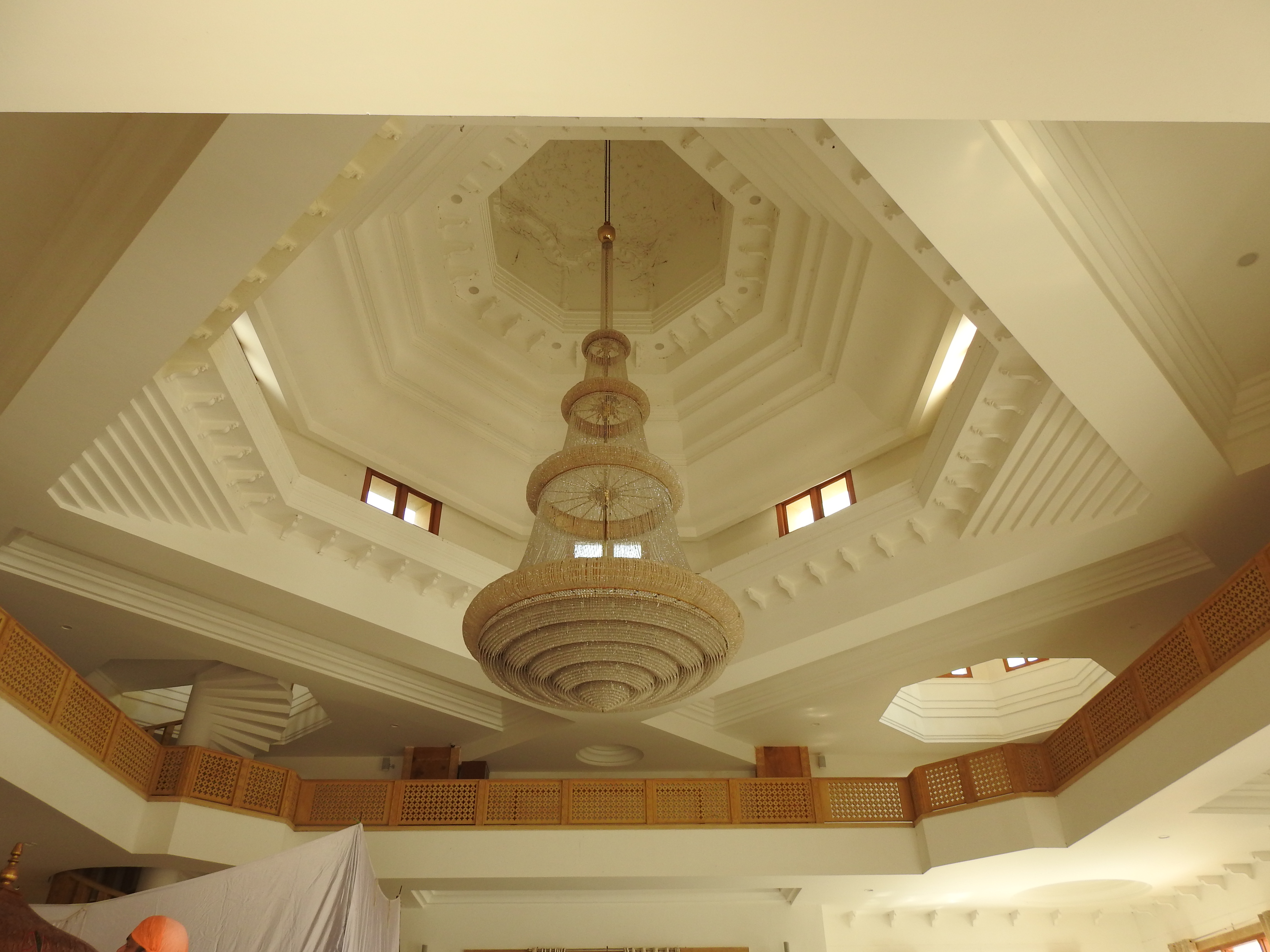
Inner view of Bhagwan Valmiki Tirath Sthal, temple

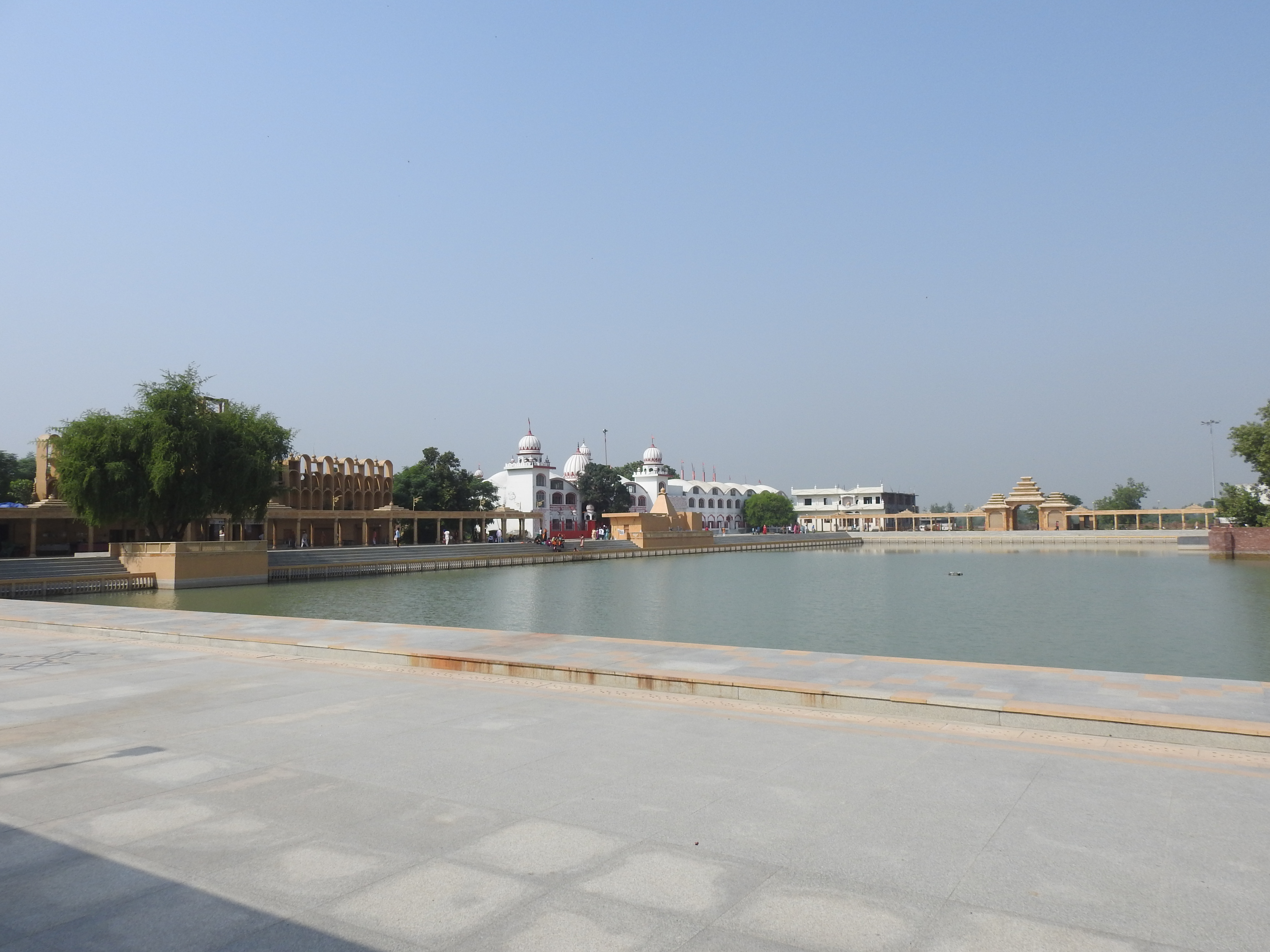
Bhagwan Valmiki Tirath Sthal, temple-sacred Pond view

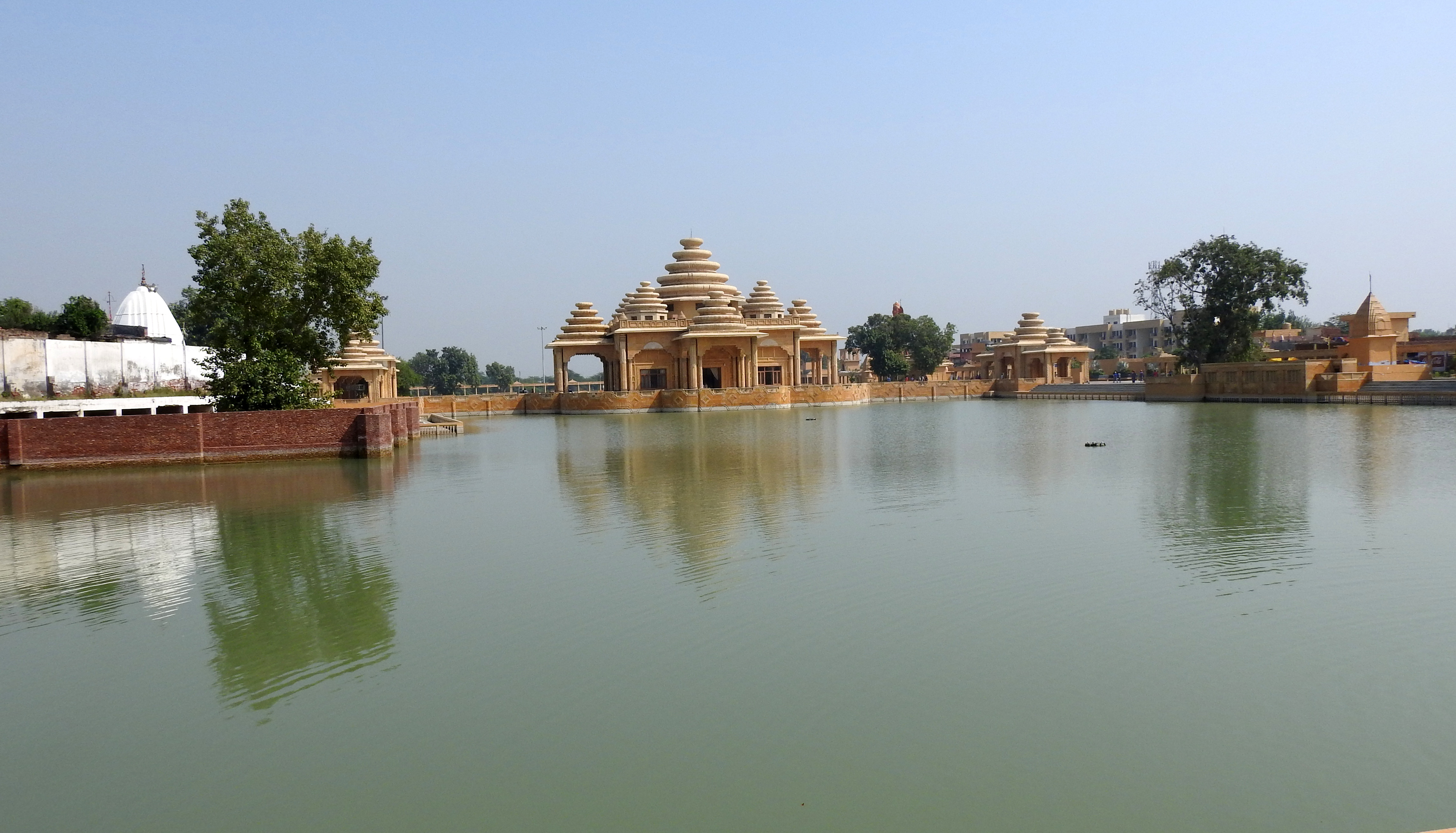
Bhagwan Valmiki Tirath Sthal, temple -sacred Pond view

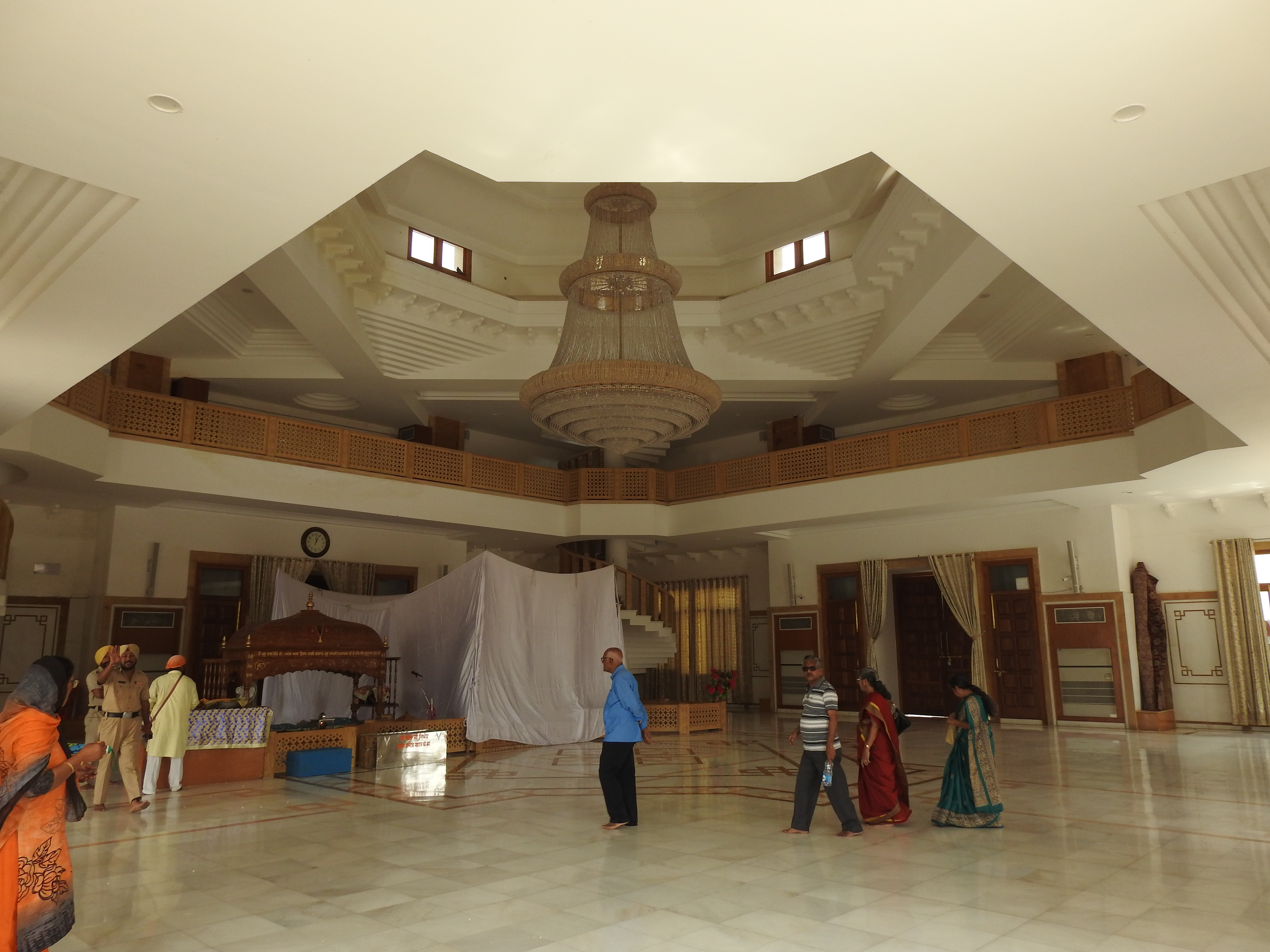
Bhagwan Valmiki Tirath Sthal, temple

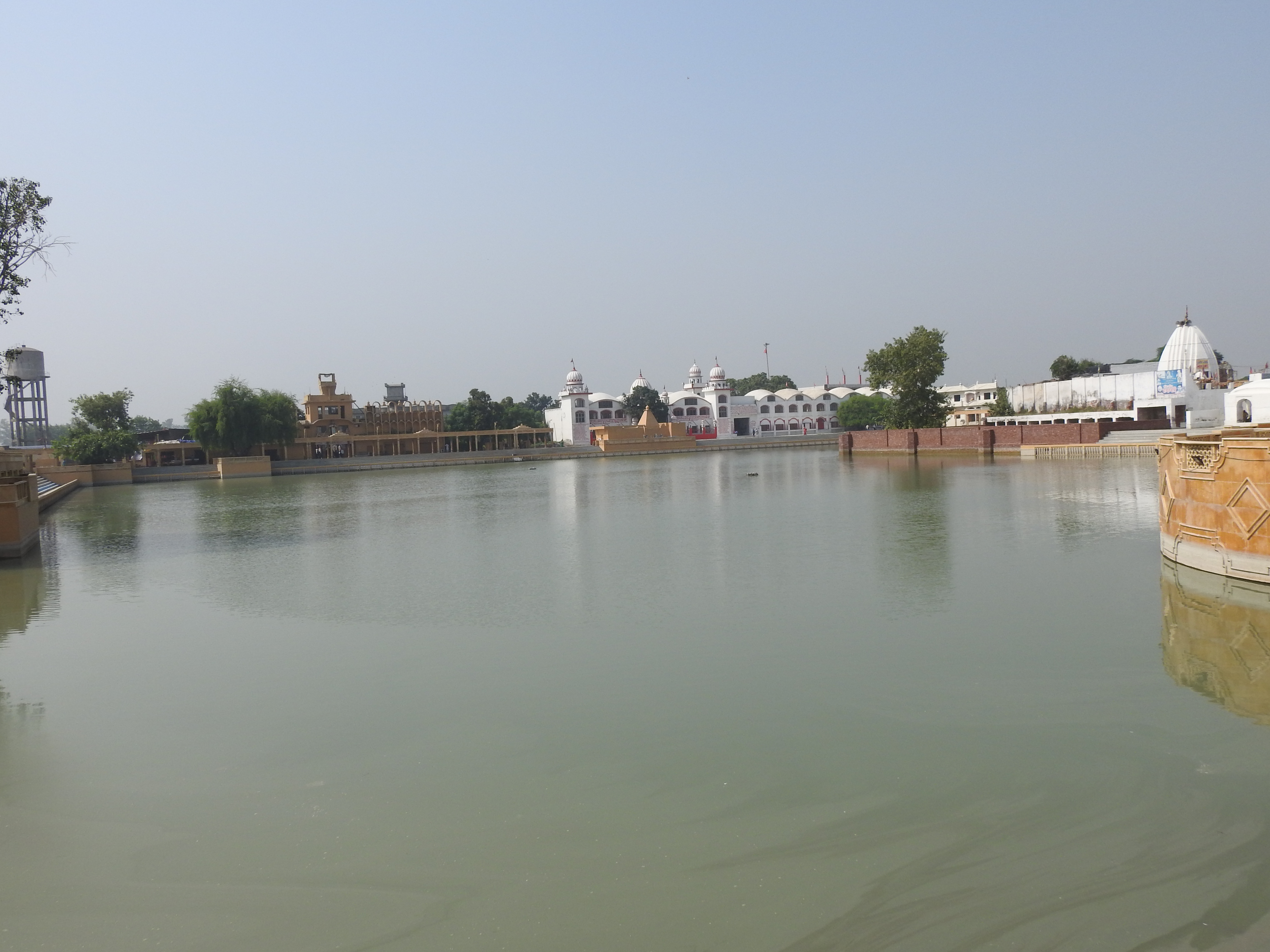
Bhagwan Valmiki Tirath Sthal, temple

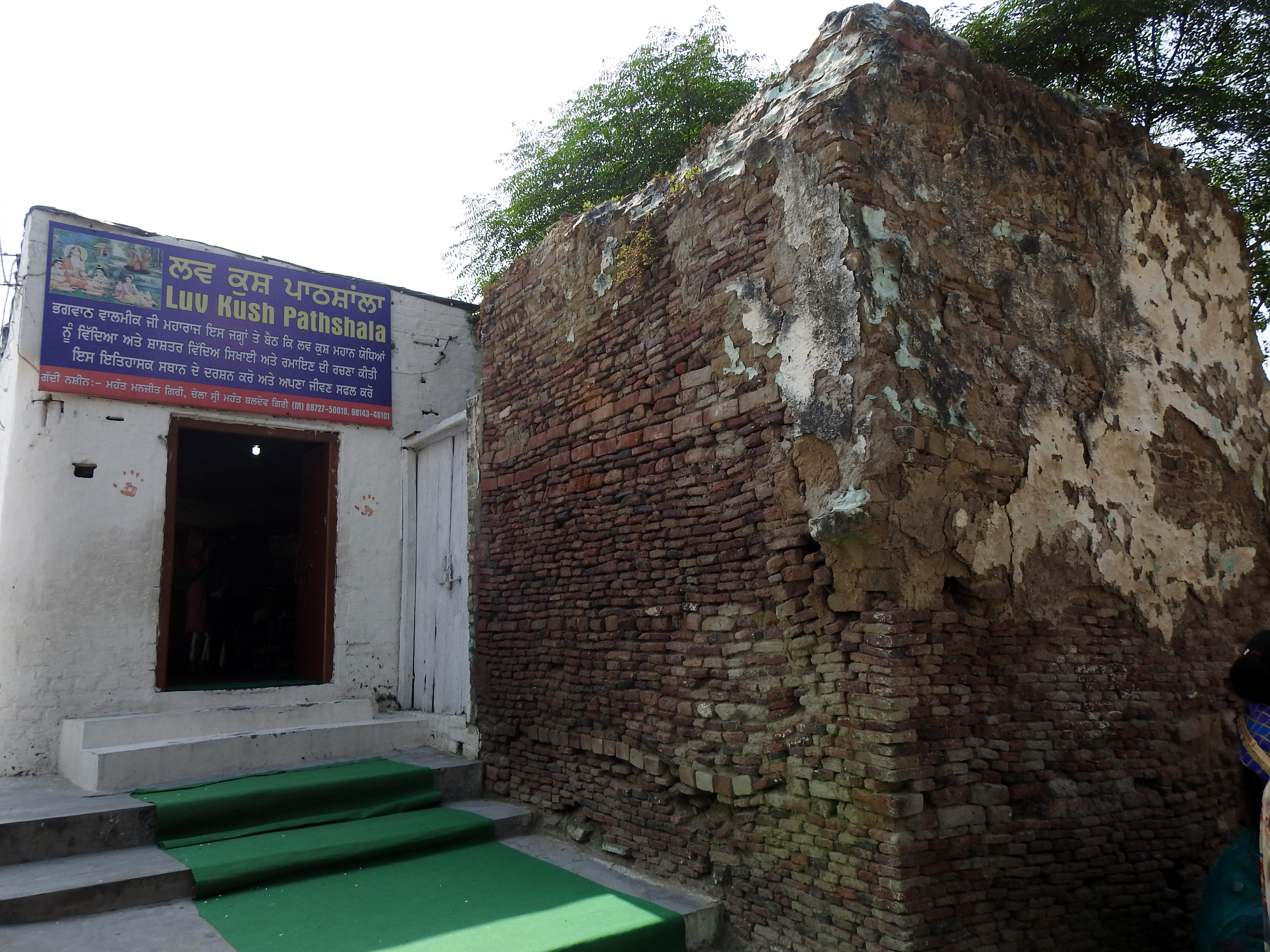
Bhagwan Valmiki Tirath Sthal, temple

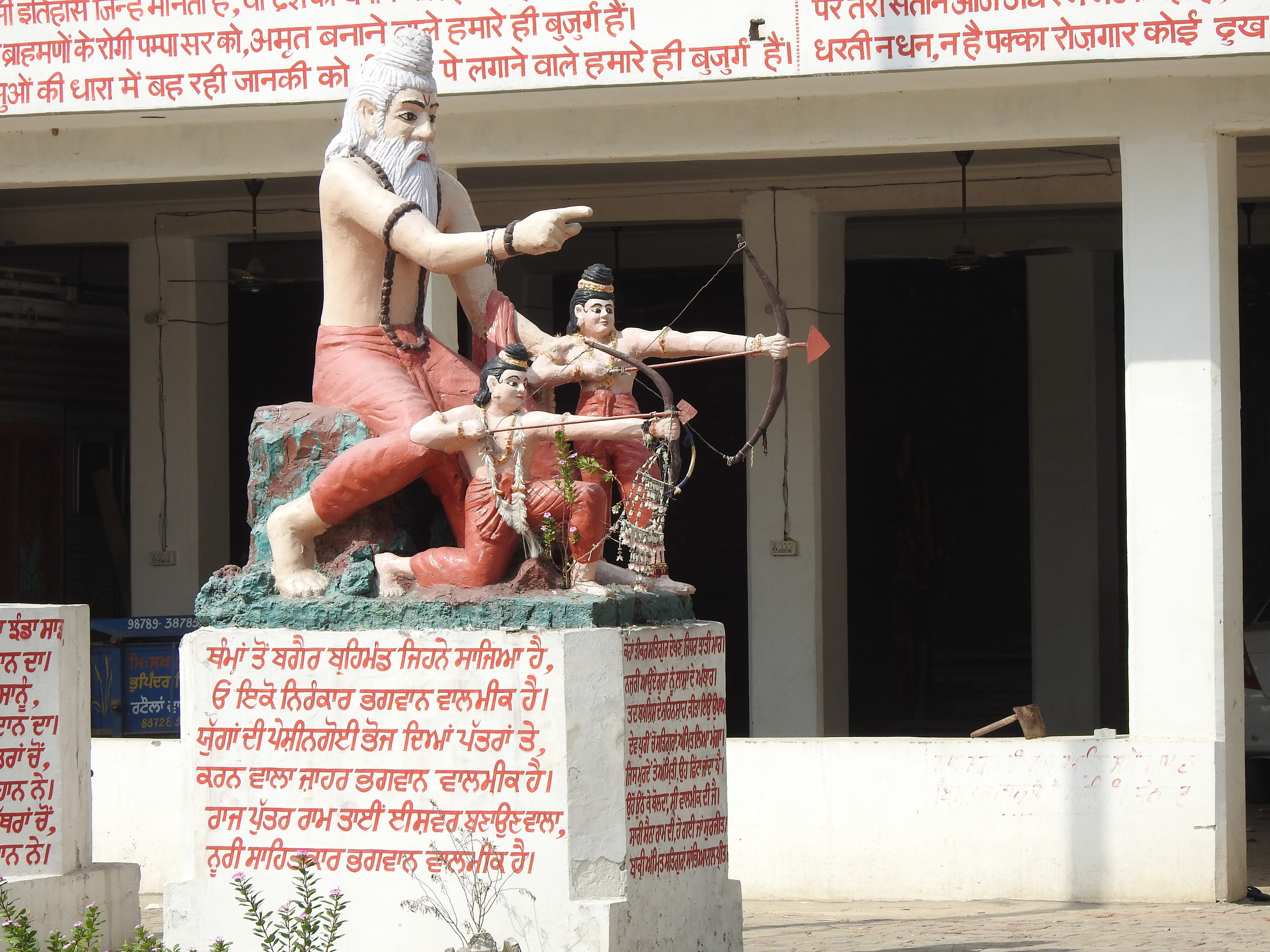
Bhagwan Valmiki Tirath Sthal, temple, Statue of Valmiki imparting training to Lov Kush

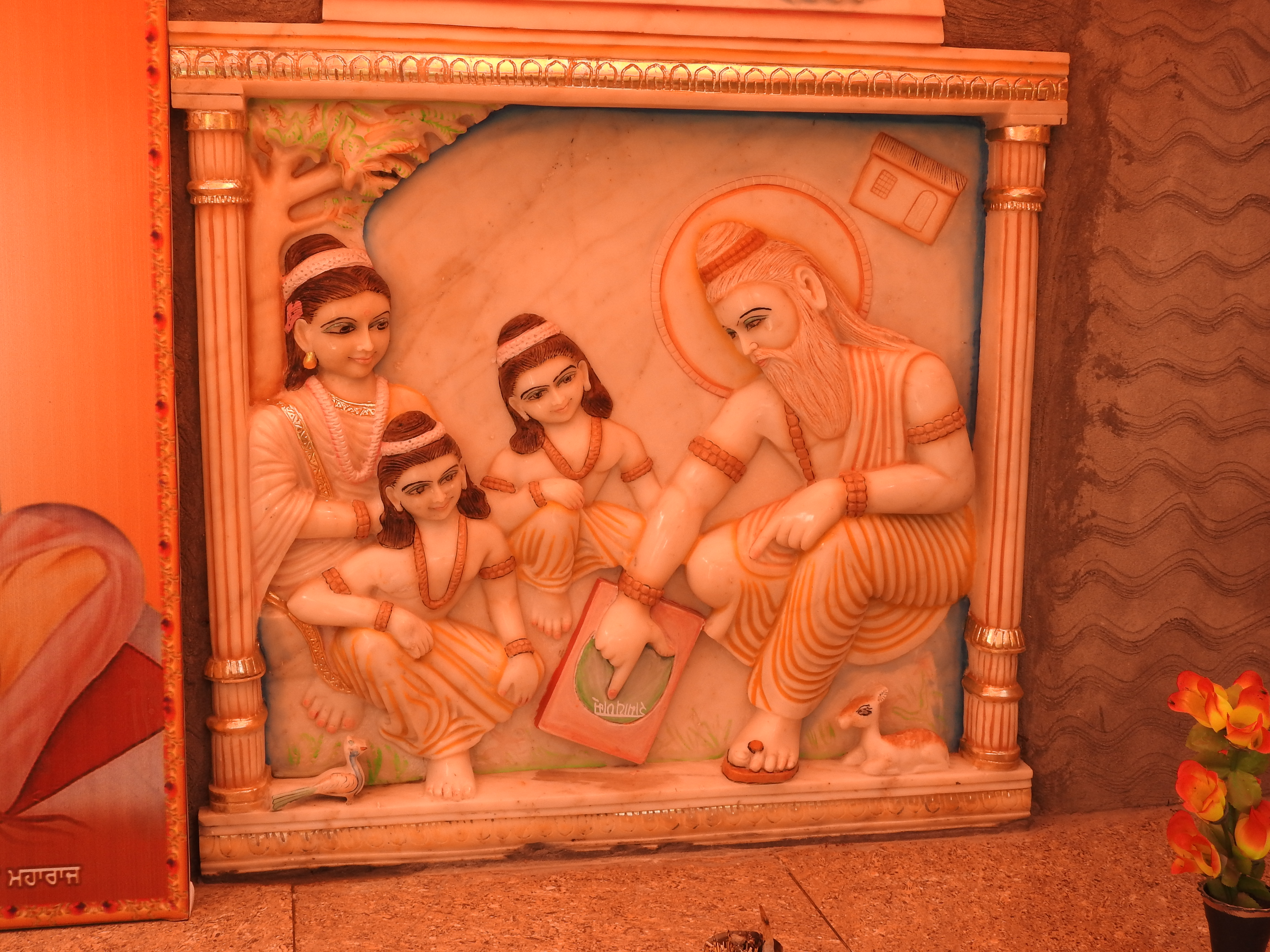
Bhagwan Valmiki Tirath Sthal, temple, painting of Valmiki imparting education to lov Kush, Sita mother is also visible in painting

== See also ==
- Hinduism
- Lord Valmiki
- Tourism in Amritsar
