= List of tourist attractions in Amritsar =

Tourist attractions in city in Punjab, India

Amritsar is a city in the northern Indian state of Punjab, located approximately 25 kilometres (15 miles) from the India–Pakistan border. It is a major centre of commerce, culture, and transportation in the region. Amritsar is the centre of Sikhism and home to its principal place of worship, the Harmandir Sahib. The city is a destination for tourism, including as part of the Golden Triangle travel circuit. Major destinations are:

- Golden Temple and Heritage Street
- Durgiana Temple
- Punjab State War Heroes' Memorial & Museum
- Bhagwan Valmiki Tirath Sthal
- Sadda Pind
- Urban Haat Food Street
- Gobindgarh Fort
- Ram Bagh Palace and Maharaja Ranjit Singh Museum
- Wagah border
- Partition Museum
- Jallianwala Bagh
- Gurdwara Baba Atal

== Museum and Memorials ==
- Punjab State War Heroes' Memorial & Museum
- The Partition Museum, Town Hall, Amritsar

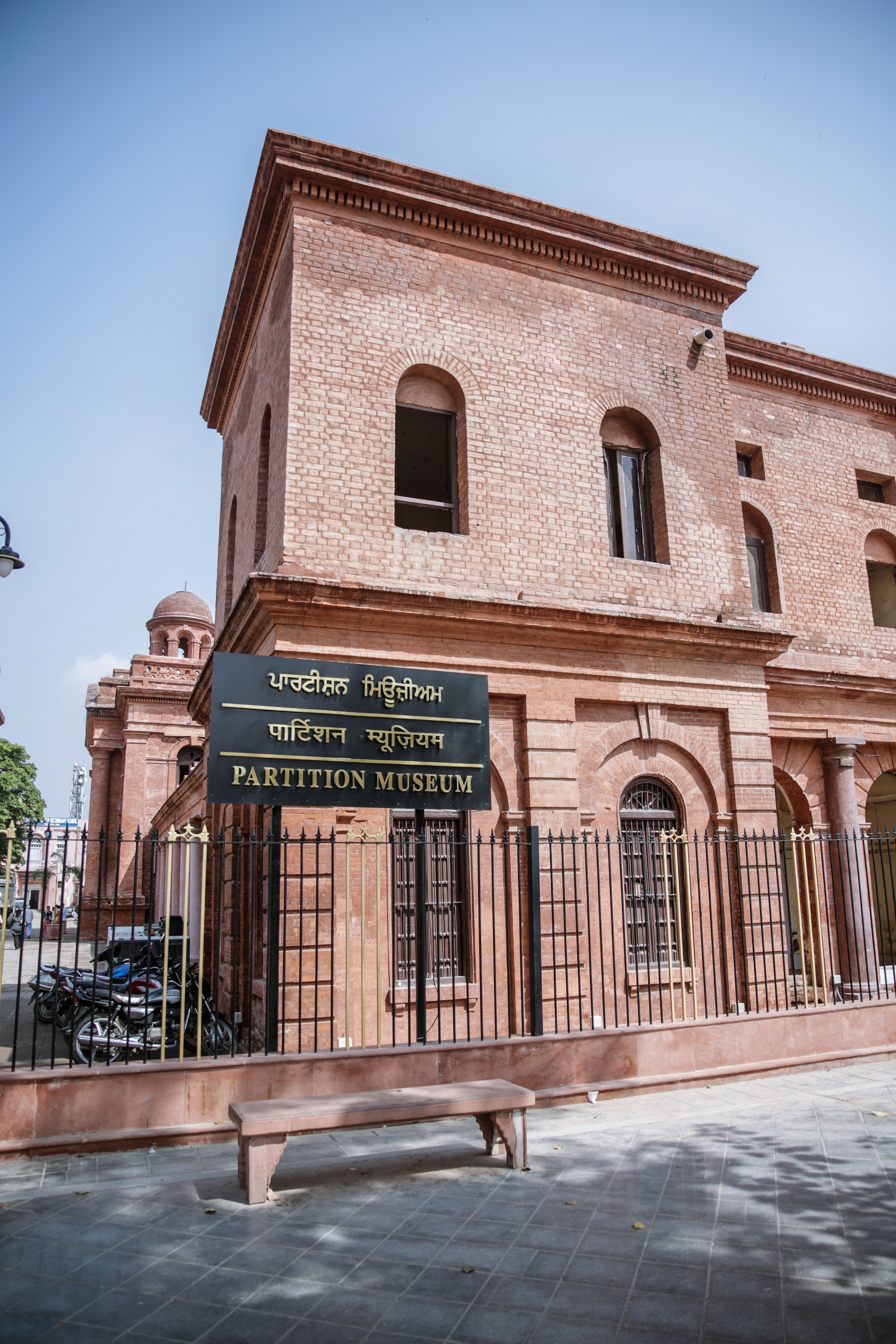
Partition Museum in Amritsar

- Jang-e-Azadi Memorial, Amritsar-Kartarpur Road

== Religious places ==
=== Golden Temple ===
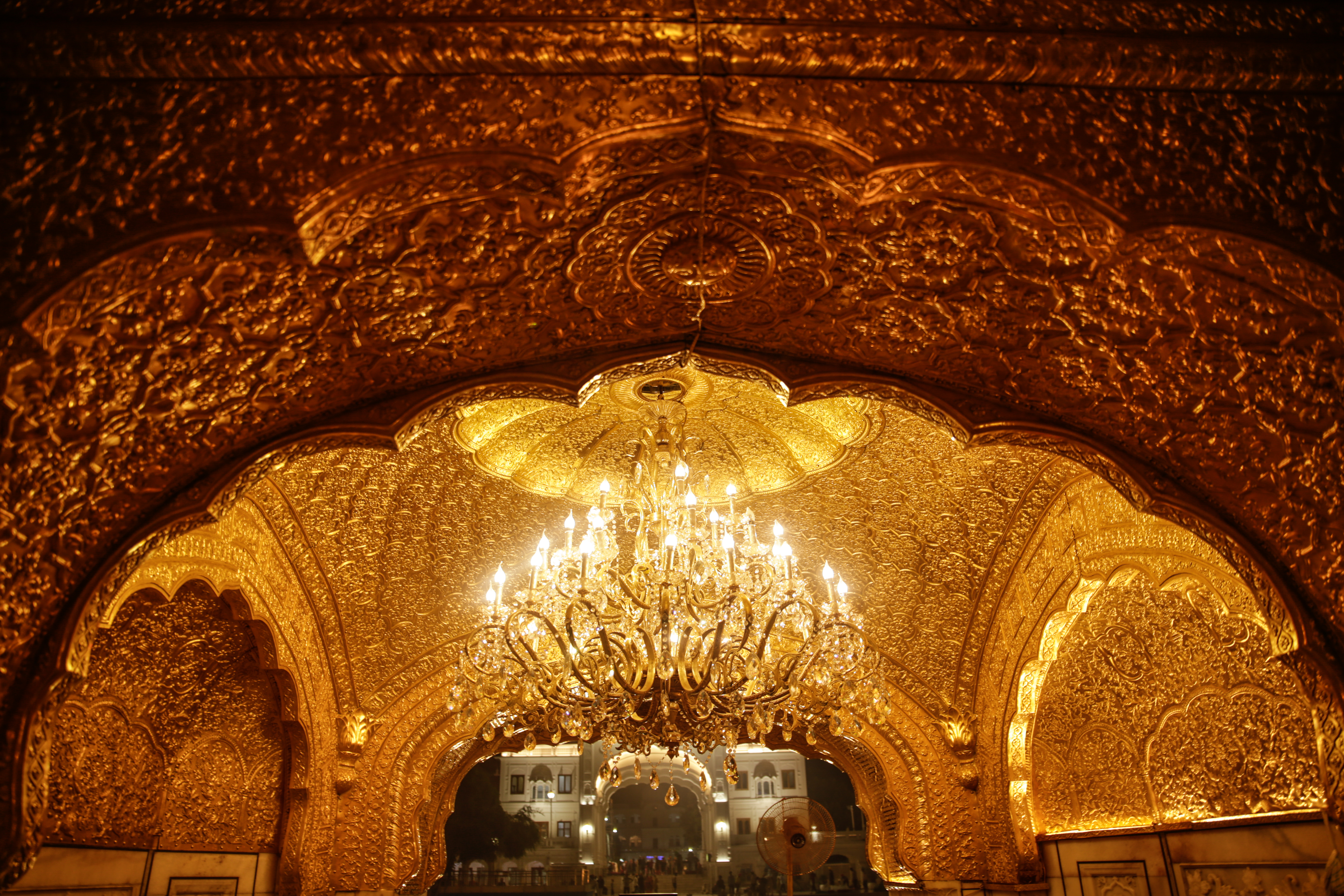
Interior of Darbar Sahib with gold encrusted walls featuring a golden chandelier.

It is the preeminent spiritual site of Sikhism, the Golden temple or Harmandir Sahib is one of the most sacred pilgrimage sites in North India. The Gurdwara is a two storied construction built on 67 ft square platform covered with marble stone. Every day more than 20,000 people, (during special occasions 100,000 people) have free food in the ‘Guru-ka-langer’, irrespective of caste, creed, colour or gender.

=== Jama Masjid Khairuddin ===
This architectural beauty situated in the Hall Bazar, was built by Mohd. Khairuddin in 1876. Tootie-e-Hind, Shah Attaullah Bukhari gave a call against the British rule at this holy place.

=== Bhagwan Valmiki Tirath Asthan ===
Bhagwan Valmiki Tirath Sthal is located on the Amritsar–Lopoke Road, approximately 11 kilometres west of Amritsar city. The site is traditionally associated with Rishi Valmiki and is linked in Hindu tradition to events described in the Ramayana. A structure at the site marks the location traditionally identified as the birthplace of Luv and Kush. An annual four-day fair is held at the site in November, coinciding with the full moon.

=== Other religious places in Amritsar ===
• St. Paul’s church

• Samadhi of Guru Angad Dev Ji

• Samadhi of Shravan

• Durgiana Temple (Lakshmi Narayan Temple)

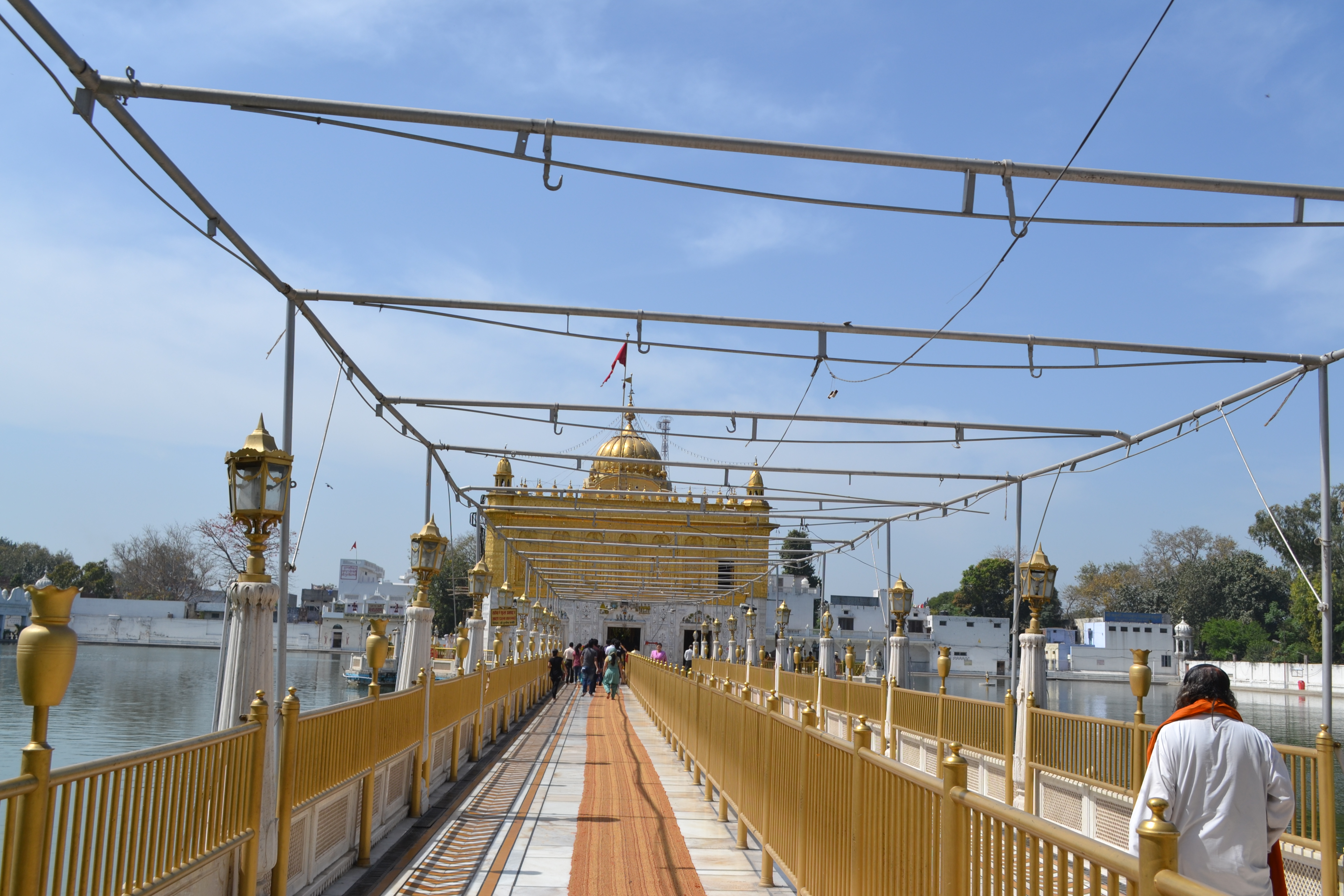
A bridge linking the temple

== Historical places ==
=== Jallianwala Bagh ===
It is a historic garden and ‘memorial of National Importance’ close to the Golden Temple complex in Amritsar- Punjab, India, preserved in the memory of those wounded and killed in the Jallianwala Bagh Massacre that occurred on the site on the festival of Baisakhi, 13 April 1919. This memorial honors 2000 Indians who were massacred due to indiscriminate firing ordered by British General Michael O’Dyer. these people were participating in peaceful public meeting. There is a memorial well where people jumped to escape the firing, and there is a section wall where bullet marks are visible, and still preserved.

=== Kalianwala Khoo ===
In 1857, when Mangal Pandey rebelled against the British, the inspired 400 soldiers platoon stationed at Lahore escaped from their barracks, swam the river Ravi and reached Ajnala. When Mr. Fredric Cooper, the then Deputy Commissioner of Amritsar received the information, he ordered to put them all in a coop-like room. Here, 200 soldiers died of asphyxia and next morning the rest of them were brutally shot dead. Their dead bodies were thrown in Kalianwala Khoo in Tehsil Ajnala.

=== Jandiala Guru ===
A town in Amritsar district known for traditional brass and copper utensil making. It is home to India's only handicraft on UNESCO's List of Intangible Cultural Heritage. The Deputy Commissioner is working to revive interest in this area through Project Virasat.

=== Pul Moran (also known as Pul Kanjri) ===
Pul Kanjri is the historical place associated with the life of Maharaja Ranjit Singh. It was located around 35 Km from Amritsar city. It is 5 km away from Wagah Border. This place was prominent during the Maharaja Ranjit Singh from 1800-1840.

Pul Kanjri has a fantastic architecture with 12 doors to let the airflow all around. The golden time of this monuments ended with the partition of the Punjab, 1947. When Kaballi's attacked the place, the people were killed and historical building was damaged. The place was restored again. Even today, people visit Pul Kanjri to pay their respects.

=== Other historical sites ===
• The Historical Banyan Tree (Shaheedi Bohr)

• Gobindgarh Fort

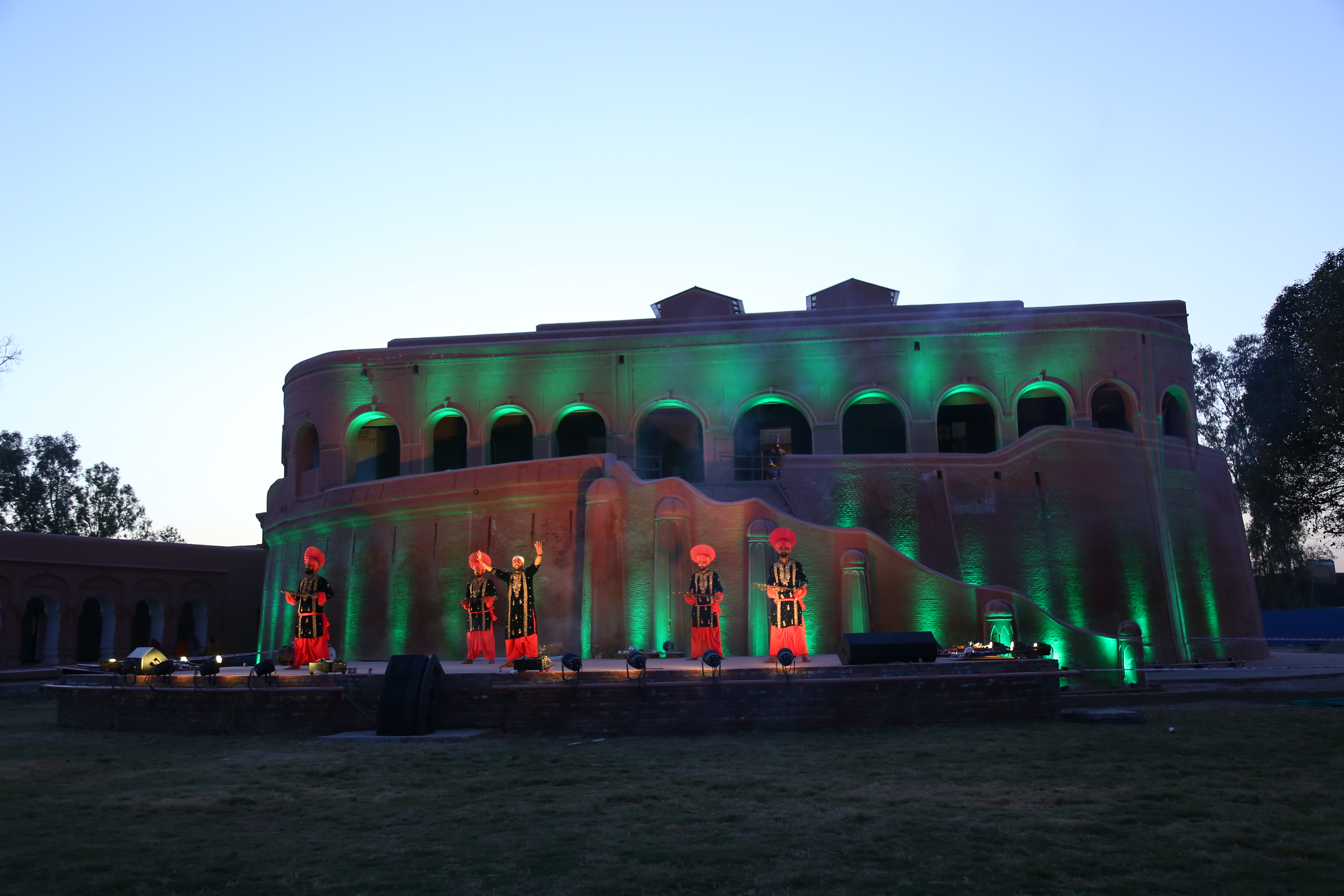
A stage for live performances at Gobindgarh Fort.

== Wild Life Sanctuaries ==
=== Harike Bird Sanctuary ===
Created in 1953, this sanctuary located 55 km south of the Amritsar city is also known as ‘Hari-ke-pattan’. The Harike lake situated in the deeper parts of the sanctuary is the largest wetland in northern India. A barrage was constructed at the confluences of Sutlej and Beas rivers to create a shallow reservoir. It is home to an enormous concentration of migratory waterfowls during winters, 7 species of turtles, 26 species of fishes, and different species of mammals.

== Shopping ==
Hall Bazaar market, located on the way to Golden temple is one of the oldest markets in Amritsar.

Katra Jaimal Singh market is another famous market for the textile and clothing items other than Shastri market where textile manufacturing industries are located. The traditional Indian jewellery ‘jadau’ can be found in Guru Bazar. For restaurants and showrooms Lahori gate market is quite popular.

Amritsari Naan (a type of bread), Patiala Shalwar (trousers which are atypically wide at the waist but which narrow to a cuffed bottom, worn by women of Punjab), Juttis (Traditional Shoes), handicrafts like Phulkari, and weaponry shops with traditional daggers (kirpan) are available here.
