= Beer in Palestine =

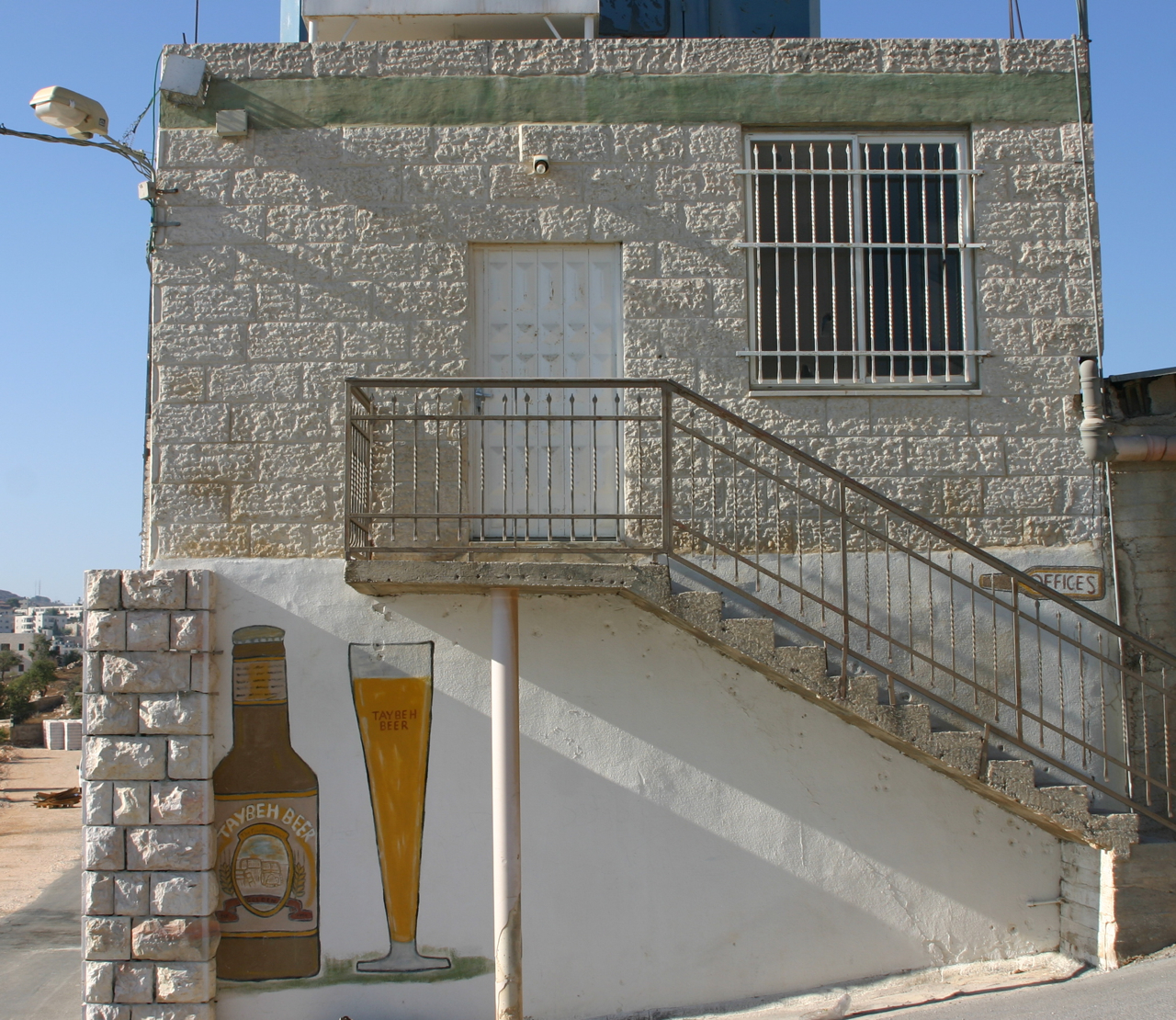
Entrance to the Taybeh Brewery in the Palestinian Christian town of Taybeh

Beer in Palestine is manufactured in Palestinian microbreweries by members of the local Palestinian Christian community – most traditionally Taybeh Brewery, established in 1994, and Birzeit Brewery, since 2015. Several beer festivals are held annually in Palestine, including an Oktoberfest-style event hosted by the Taybeh Brewery.

== History ==
The oldest brewery in the State of Palestine is the Taybeh Brewery, which was opened by Palestinian Christians in the town village of Taybeh, near Ramallah, in 1994, and produced its first beer in 1995. It is considered the first microbrewery in the Middle East.

The idea of a Palestinian brewery was controversial in 1994, as Palestine is majority Muslim, and many Palestinian Muslims disapprove of alcohol consumption. The Palestinian President Yasser Arafat was nevertheless an early supporter of the Taybeh Brewery, according to its founder, on the grounds that it would help break Palestine's dependence on alcohol imported from Israel. Taybeh beer was also certified as kosher shortly after its founding, and 70% of its sales prior to the Second Intifada in 2000 were to Israelis. Taybeh also depended on imports that passed through Israel for its equipment and ingredients.

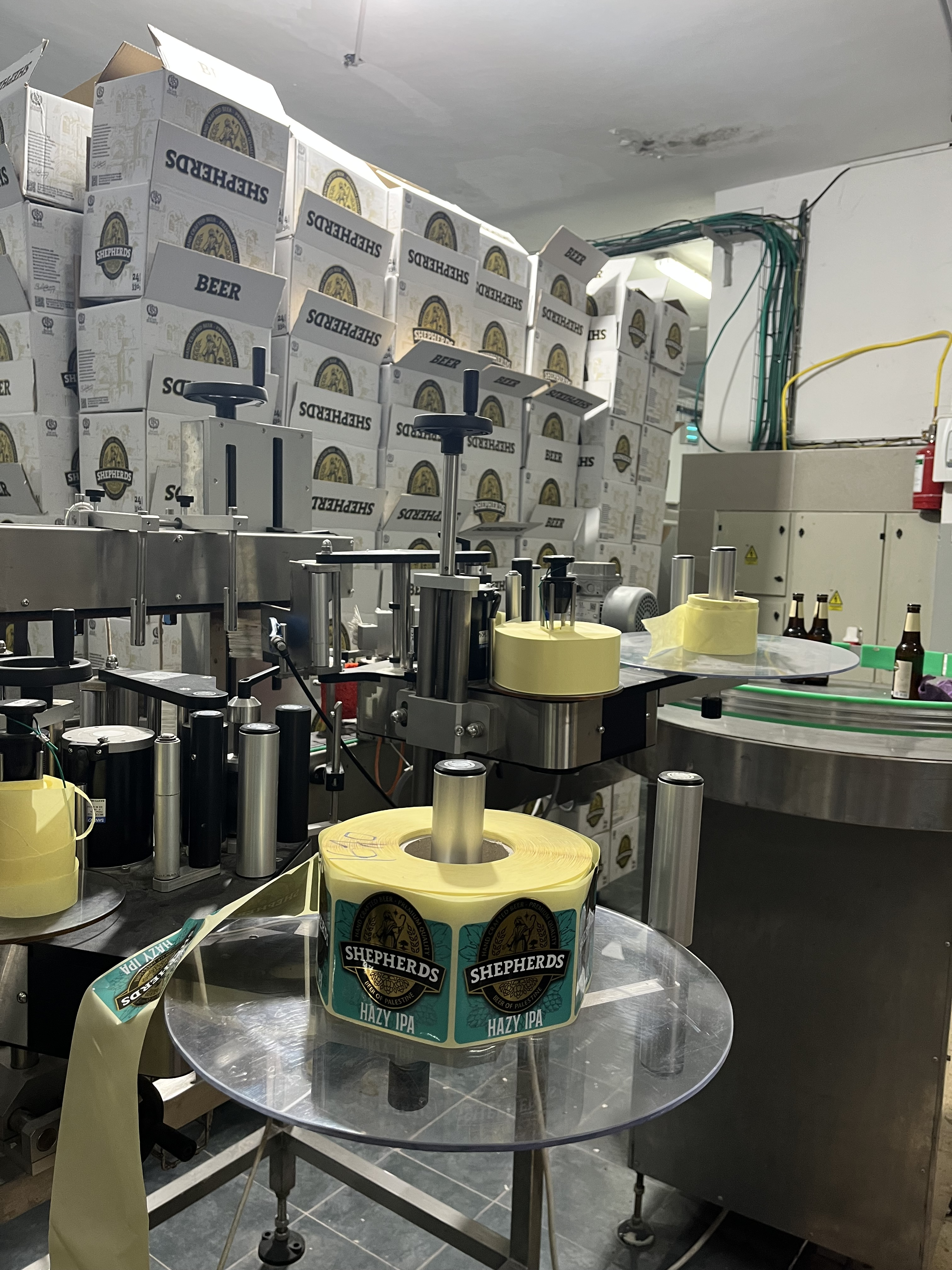
Birzeit Brewery, in the Palestinian Christian village of Birzeit, is the second brewery in the State of Palestine

Following the Second Intifada, the establishment of Israeli checkpoints and the erection of the Israeli West Bank barrier made it significantly more difficult for the Taybeh Brewery to import brewing equipment and supplies from the port of Ashdod, and on one occasion, the brewery was charged $6,000 in costs for hold-ups at the port on a $20,000 shipment of bottles. The barriers also complicated shipping of beer to customers in Israel or abroad, cutting off exports to Jordan and lengthening the travel time from the brewery to Jerusalem from 20 minutes to several hours.

As a result, sales plunged and revenue fell by over 90% by 2002, and Khoury had to lay off all 12 of his employees. As a stopgap measure to keep the brewery in business, Taybeh sold olive oil produced by a local church in Taybeh village to a company in Belgium.

Taybeh's first local Palestinian competition came in 2015 with the establishment, also by Palestinian Christians, of the Birzeit Brewery in the town of Birzeit near Ramallah. Although established in 2013, Birzeit Brewery only began sales of its signature "Shepherds Beer" in July 2015, due to the challenges associated with operating in the Israeli-occupied State of Palestine.

In 2016, a third microbrewery called Wise Men Choice, based in the Christian town of Beit Sahour, east of Bethlehem, entered the local market.

In 2022, a fourth microbrewery, Nativity Beer, also based in Beit Sahour, Bethlehem, entered the local market.

== Beers ==
As of October 2018, Taybeh Beer came in six varieties: Golden, Light, Dark, Amber, Non-alcoholic, and White. Golden, which is 5% alcohol by volume (ABV) is the original variety. Its taste has been compared to Samuel Adams' Boston Lager. The Dark and Light beers (6% and 3.5% ABV, respectively) were introduced for the 2000 celebrations in the Holy Land. The Dark variety follows a classic style of the way monks brewed beer in the Middle Ages in order to fortify themselves during their fasting. An Amber variety (5.5% ABV) was launched in 2007. A non-alcoholic beer variety was introduced in 2008 specifically for the local Palestinian Muslim market. Taybeh White (3.8% ABV), a Belgian-style wheat beer, was launched in 2013. The Shepherds Beer line produced by Birzeit includes a blonde Czech-style Pilsner, an English-type amber ale, a heavier Irish stout, and at least one rotating seasonal flavour at any given time.

The Wise Men Choice Brewery produces a range of spicey and fruity beers, including its Bethlehem Pale Ale, which is flavoured with sage, and its Pumpkin Ale, which is flavoured with pumpkin and honey.

== Festivals ==
In 2005, the Taybeh Brewery launched an annual Oktoberfest-style beer festival dubbed the Taybeh Beer Festival that was featured in a 2008 documentary produced by an Australian named Lara van Raay called Palestine, Beer and Oktoberfest Under Occupation, which focuses on the Taybeh Brewery and its founding.

In 2016, Birzeit Brewery launched the annual Shepherds Beer Festival in Beit Sahour. In August 2017, the event drew 7,000—8,000 visitors across two days. It has been held in August again each year ever since.

== Political issues ==
Breweries in Palestine face numerous logistical challenges as a result of the Israeli occupation of the West Bank and control of nearby ports, which are the most direct means of importing raw materials and exporting finished beer. Supplies that take two weeks to get from Europe to Israel can take another three months to reach a brewery in the West Bank. The high cost of shipping due to checkpoints and other constraints can make it difficult for Palestinian breweries to compete. Taybeh beer kegs have also been cut open by Israeli authorities on occasion and their containers sent back. The disparity in water access in the West Bank brought about by continued Israeli settlement expansion also means that Palestinian breweries face concerns over limits to their access to water, discouraging their expansion.

== See also ==
- Beer and breweries by region
- Palestinian cuisine
