= Heritage Street Amritsar =

Street in Amritsar, Punjab, India

Heritage Street, Amritsar
- Heritage Walk
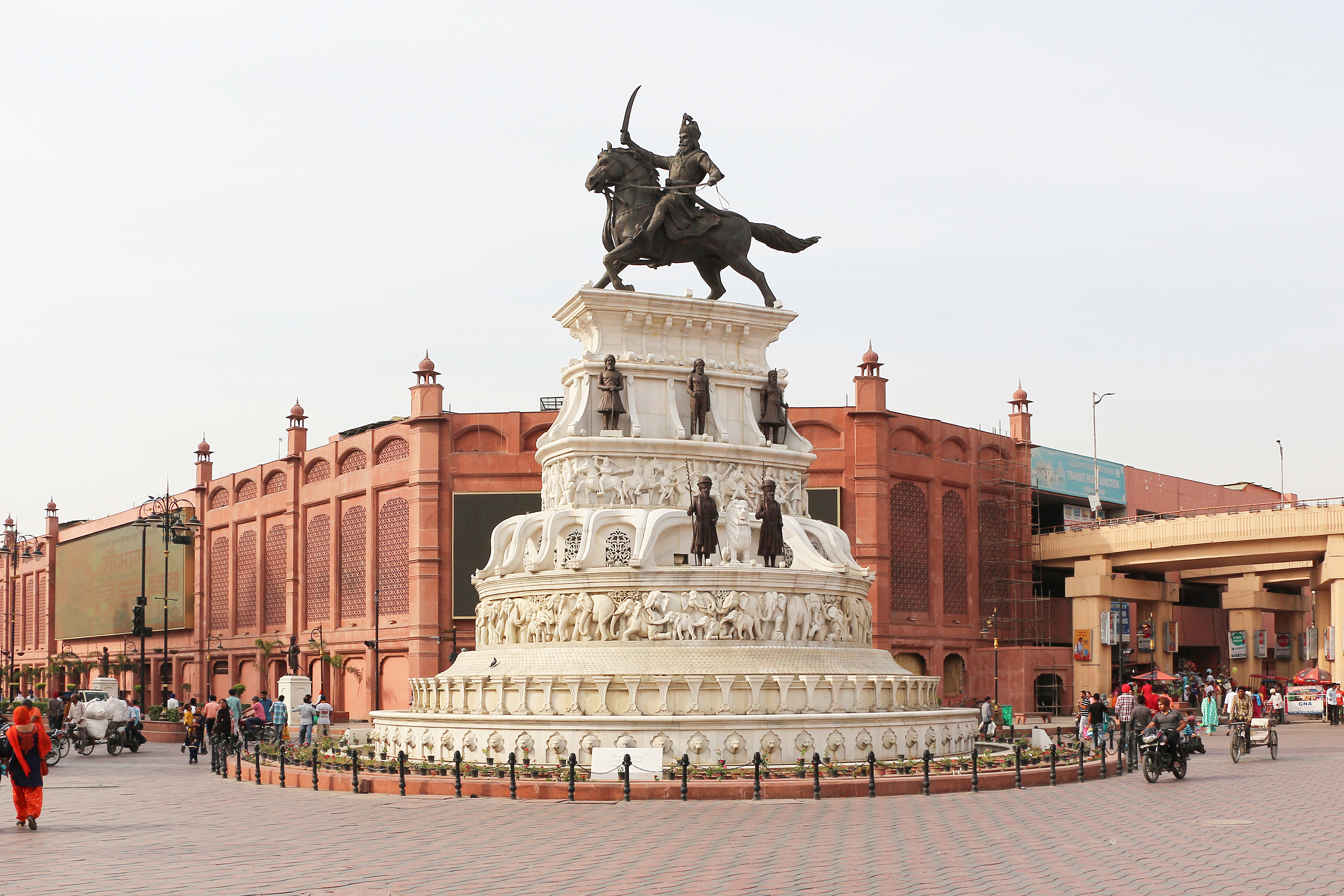
- View of Heritage Street, Amritsar

Route information
- Maintained by Government of Punjab
- Length: 1.1 km (0.68 mi)
- Existed: 26 October 2016–present

Major junctions
- Tourist loop around Amritsar
- From: Town Hall
- To: Golden Temple

Location
- Country: India

Highway system
- Roads in India; Expressways; National; State; Asian; State Highways in

Heritage Street, Amritsar is one of the oldest streets of Amritsar in Punjab, India, located between the Golden Temple and the Town Hall. The street was reconstructed and opened by Chief Minister of Punjab Parkash Singh Badal in on 26 October 2016 as a tourist attraction and open walk street on the lines of open monuments in European cities like Rome, Venice and Florence.

== History and Background ==
The Golden Temple is the most visited place in Punjab, India, with over 100,000 visitors daily. The stretch from Town Hall to Golden Temple was messed with vehicles, overhead cables, encroachments and street hawkers. The idea of Heritage Street was created to develop a revampled, no-vehicle zone with a new 'heritage façade' to each of 170 shops in it. The construction took over 330 days and 1200 people to complete.

== Construction ==
The construction was carried out by Jaipur-based architect Anup Bartaria and his firm called 'Sincere Architects' The facade along with the street that leads to the shrine was redeveloped on lines of European Cities. The idea was to give the place a vintage look, reminiscent of Amritsar that existed 400 years ago. More than 20 buildings and facades were refurbished in the project. Each facade was unique in construction and its requirements. Biggest hurdle was to mount fixtures in public places where there was no space available for mounting. The architects did not want to see the fixtures at all. Town Hall was an existing facade and it was a part of the heritage site. No drilling, external mounting was allowed on the facade.

== Key Attractions ==
- Golden Temple
- Akal Takht Sahib
- Partition Museum (Town Hall)
- Jallianwala Bagh
- Sarai
- Maharaja Ranjit Singh Chowk

== Inspiration ==
Heritage Street in Amritsar was first of its kind concept in India. Upon its success, many more streets are planned and developed on the lines of Heritage Street, Amritsar as follows:

- Chandni Chowk in Delhi is being redeveloped on the lines of Heritage Street, Amritsar
- Heritage Street in Patiala is planned on the lines of Heritage Street, Amritsar
