= Kolkata Partition Museum =

Museum in Kolkata, India

- Established: August 2018; 8 years ago
- Type: Historical museum
- Founder: Rituparna Roy
- Architect: Aurgho Jyoti
- Website: kolkata-partition-museum.org

The Kolkata Partition Museum is an initiative dedicated to documenting the Partition of India from the Bengal perspective. Dissimilar to the Punjabi context, the Bengal province had been divided twice: once in 1905, and then in 1947. The aftermath of the second partition, as recorded by many historians, unfolded distinctly in postcolonial Bengal vis-à-vis Punjab. Not only was the impact long-drawn and can be witnessed even 75 years after the Partition, its effect can also be seen in the neighbouring states of Bengal and the rest of the country owing to refugee resettlements spread out to as far away states such as Maharashtra and Chhattisgarh. The idea behind the Kolkata Partition Museum is to preserve and present the vanishing memories of partition, to emphasise both the "rupture and continuities between West Bengal and Bangladesh – in terms of language and literature, food, fabric, and the performing arts – and to encourage collaboration between them." The museum aims "to do so by involving public participation in its programs and gearing all its activities in a way that makes it more accessible and interesting to the public at large."

== History ==
The Kolkata Partition Museum Project was envisioned by Rituparna Roy, a Partition scholar and lecturer of English literature, initially in 2007 when she witnessed the Holocaust Memorials of Berlin and "wondered why there was no such comparable public memorialisation of the partition in India." The Palestine Museum in Birzeit, near Jerusalem, was also one of her early inspirations. In August 2016, as part of an international conference commemorating 70 years of Partition at the Indian Museum in Kolkata, funded by The New Zealand India Research Institute (NZIRI) and The Ministry of Culture, Government of India, which was co-convened by Roy alongside historian Sekhar Bandyopadhyay and Dr Jayanta Sengupta, this project was formally introduced and later on 20 August 2018 registered as a trust—The Kolkata Partition Museum Trust (KPMT).

There are similar initiatives such as The 1947 Partition Archive founded by Dr Guneeta Singh Bhalla in 2010 and The Partition Museum, Amritsar founded by The Arts and Cultural Heritage Trust (TAACHT) in early 2015. Historian Urvashi Butalia theorised the idea for a museum chronicling the partition around 2011 and also pointed out some of the pitfalls. In 2010, a few students from several Mumbai schools—Cathedral, JB Petit, Ambani, as well as HR and Jai Hind colleges—had jointly "launched a project titled "Remembering Partition" in collaboration with two organisations, Citizens for Peace in India and Citizens' Archive of Pakistan." Their goal was "to increase awareness about the partition of India and to honor those who experienced partition." It is not known what became of this project. However, the characteristic feature of the Kolkata Partition Museum Project is that it seeks to document the Bengali experience of partition, albeit not exclusively. While both the Archive and the Museum in Amritsar have documented the partition of Bengal, through oral testimonies of individuals who witnessed the partition first-hand or microhistories of family members, the emphasis on systematically memorialising the specific history of Bengal is lacking. KPM aims to dedicate itself towards filling in this gap and bringing forward the unique trajectory of Bengal, starting with the Partition of Bengal in 1905.

== Plans ==
On August 15, 2022, which marked 75 years of partition, the Kolkata Partition Museum announced the launch of a virtual museum (V-KPM) in collaboration between KPMT and Architecture Urbanism Research (AUR), an architecture firm based in New York and New Delhi, headed by Aurgho Jyoti. The primary objective of this virtual museum initiative was to "create a time travel experience to access Bengal’s history: Bengal Partition, Museum, Border, Subaltern space, and Time & Memory." Notable historical events like the Partition of Bengal in 1905 ordered by viceroy Lord Curzon, the Bengal famine of 1943, the Great Calcutta Killings of 1946, the Independence and Partition in 1947, the 1958 Resettlement project for East Pakistan refugees in Dandakaranya, the Birth of Bangladesh in 1971, and the Marichjhapi Massacre of 1979 were highlighted. Apart from the launch of a virtual museum, the KPMT has organised film screenings of partition related films, art exhibitions, and conferences regarding history, partition, and memory.

As of June 2023, a physical museum is yet to be constructed. However, Roy does plan on launching a physical museum, "house a Partition Public Library, and inaugurate a Partition Walk in the city" in the future.

== See also ==
- The 1947 Partition Archive
- The Partition Museum, Amritsar
- Partition Museum, Delhi
