= Partition Horrors Remembrance Day =

Partition of India memorial on 14 August

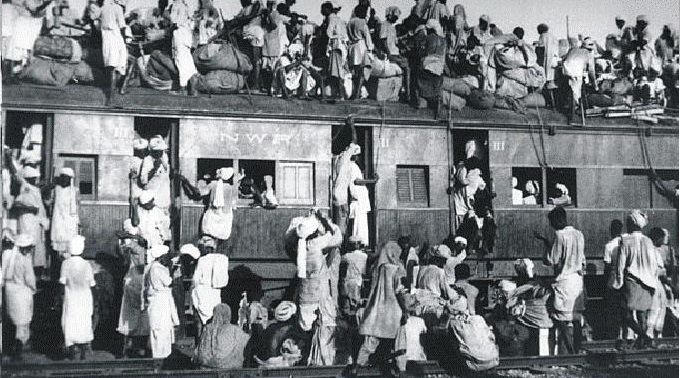
- Hindus and Sikhs migrating by train from Bannu to India
- Official name: English: Partition Horrors Remembrance Day
- Observed by: India
- Significance: In memory of the struggles and sacrifices of people during the partition
- Date: 14 August
- Next time: 14 August 2027
- Frequency: Annual
- First time: 14 August 2021 (5 years ago)
- Started by: Government of India
- Related to: Partition of India

Partition Horrors Remembrance Day is an annual national memorial day observed on 14 August in India, commemorating the victims and sufferings of people during the 1947 partition of India. It was first observed in 2021, after an announcement by Prime Minister Narendra Modi.

The day remembers the sufferings of many Indians during the partition. Numerous families were displaced and many lost their lives in the partition. It aims to remind Indians the need to remove social divisions, disharmony and to further strengthen the spirit of oneness, social harmony and human empowerment.

The partition had left 10 to 20 million people displaced and left 200,000 to 2 million dead. (Note: "The death toll remains disputed with figures ranging from 200,000 to 2 million.") (Note: "Some 12 million people were displaced in the divided province of Punjab alone, and up to 20 million in the subcontinent as a whole.")

== Background ==
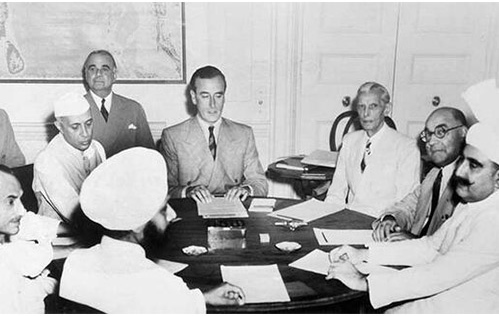
Lord Mountbatten meets Nehru, Jinnah and other Leaders to discuss the Partition of India in 1947.

The Partition was the division of British India (Note: British India consisted of those regions of the British Raj, or the British Indian Empire, which were directly administered by Britain; other regions, of nominal sovereignty, that were indirectly ruled by Britain, were called princely states.) into two independent Dominions: India and Pakistan. The two states have since gone through further reorganization: the Dominion of India is today the Republic of India (since 1950); while the Dominion of Pakistan was composed of what is known today as the Islamic Republic of Pakistan (since 1956) and the People's Republic of Bangladesh (since 1971). The partition involved the division of two provinces, Bengal and Punjab, based on district-wide non-Muslim or Muslim majorities. The partition also saw the division of the British Indian Army, the Royal Indian Navy, the Indian Civil Service, the railways, and the central treasury. The partition was outlined in the Indian Independence Act 1947 and resulted in the dissolution of the British Raj, i.e. Crown rule in India. The two self-governing independent Dominions of India and Pakistan legally came into existence at midnight on 15 August 1947.

The partition of India occurred on the basis of religious separatism, demanded by the All-India Muslim League who propagated the idea that Indian Muslims and Indian Hindus were two different nations—a theory that was propounded by the Hindu Mahasabha as well. The Indian National Congress, along with the Communist Party of India, All India Azad Muslim Conference, Khudai Khidmatgar, All India Anglo-Indian Association, All India Conference of Indian Christians (AICIC), and Chief Khalsa Diwan, adamantly opposition to India's partition as it upheld the concept of composite nationalism—that the Indian nation is made up of a "diversity of religions, creeds, castes, sub-castes, communities and cultures". Mahatma Gandhi, Abdul Ghaffar Khan, Frank Anthony, Purushottam Das Tandon, Maulana Azad, Tara Singh and Allah Bux Soomro actively worked to oppose the partition of India. The leader of All India Muslim League, Muhammad Ali Jinnah, demanded "either a divided India or a destroyed India" and called for Direct Action Day, which resulted in communal violence that sowed the seeds for the partition of India. Though the demand of the All India Muslim League was eventually accepted by the British, the state of India officially rejected the two-nation theory and chose to be a secular state, enshrining the concepts of religious pluralism and composite nationalism in its constitution.

The partition displaced between 10 and 20 million people along religious lines, creating overwhelming refugee crises in the newly constituted dominions. There was large-scale violence, with estimates of the loss of life accompanying or preceding the partition disputed and varying between several hundred thousand and two million. Pakistan was created through the partition of India on the basis of religious segregation; the very concept of dividing the country of India has criticized for its implication "that people with different backgrounds" cannot live together. After it occurred, critics of the partition of India point to the displacement of fifteen million people, the murder of more than one million people, and the rape of 75,000 women to demonstrate the view that it was a mistake. The violent nature of the partition created an atmosphere of hostility and suspicion between India and Pakistan that affects their relationship to this day.

== Observance ==
On 14 August 2021, Prime Minister Narendra Modi declared that 14 August annually will be remembered as Partition Horrors Remembrance Day to remind the nation of the sufferings and sacrifices of Indians during the partition in 1947.

On 14 August 2021, Prime Minister Narendra Modi said, "Partitions pains can never be forgotten. Millions of our sisters and brothers were displaced and many lost their lives due to mindless hate and violence. In memory of the struggles and sacrifices of our people, 14th August will be observed as Partition Horrors Remembrance Day, May the Partition Horrors Remembrance Day keep reminding us of the need to remove the poison of social divisions, disharmony and further strengthen the spirit of oneness, social harmony and human empowerment."

In 2022, the Delhi Metro honoured Partition Horrors Remembrance Day by setting up an exhibit that included "panels on the wrecked buildings in Lahore and Amritsar".

The University Grants Commission, in 2022, implored all academic institutions to plan observances for Partition Horrors Remembrance Day. The University of Kashmir honoured Partition Horrors Remembrance Day by organising a photo exhibition aimed at highlighting "the agony, suffering and pain of millions of sufferers of the Partition".

In 2023, the Jamia Millia Islamia in Delhi organized presentations and panel discussion, with question and answer sessions, along with a Photo Exhibition on Partition Horrors Remembrance Day. The Thiruvananthapuram Railway Division had an exhibition of photographs for the public, as did the "Nagercoil Junction, Kollam Junction, Alappuzha, Kottayam, Ernakulam Junction, and Thrissur railway stations of Thiruvananthapuram Division, Southern Railway." This was organized by Thalanad Chandrasekharan Nair, a follower of Mahatma Gandhi.

== See also ==
- Opposition to the partition of India
- The 1947 Partition Archive
- Partition Museum
