= Birzeit Brewery =

Palestinian Christian brewery

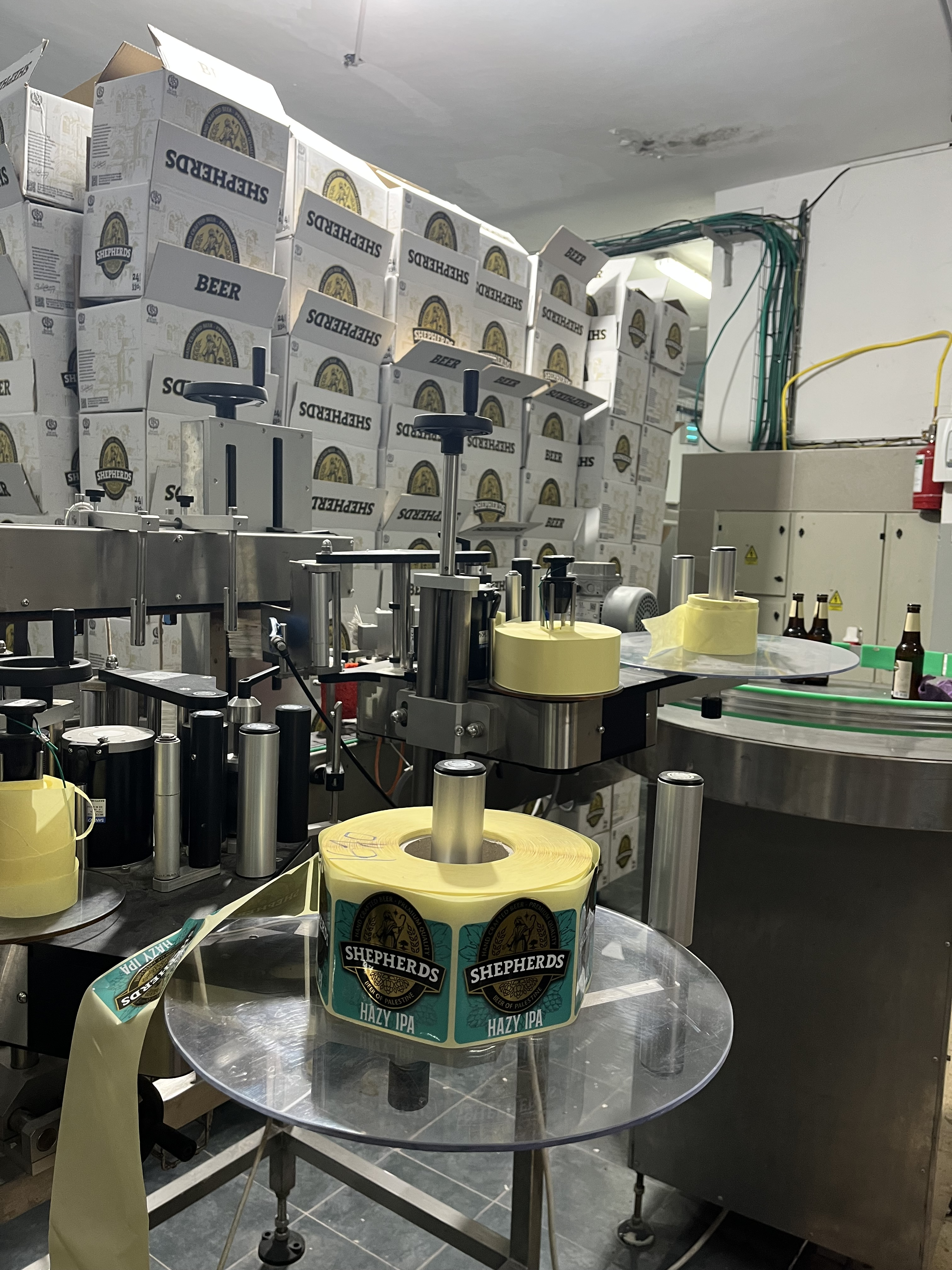
- Industry: Alcoholic beverages
- Founded: 2013
- Founders: Alaa Sayej, Khalid Sayej, Aziz Sayej
- Headquarters: Birzeit, Palestine
- Products: Beer
- Number of employees: 10+

Birzeit Brewery, known for its signature Shepherds Beer, is a microbrewery founded in 2013 in the town of Birzeit, Palestine, 7.5 kilometers to the north of Ramallah, by the Sayej brothers, members of the local Palestinian Christian community. Though the Brewery was established in 2013, it only began commercial sales of its signature line, called Shepherds Beer, in July 2015, due to challenges with operating in Palestine while under the Israeli occupation. It is the second craft brewery to be established in the Palestinian Authority, after Taybeh Brewery.

== History ==
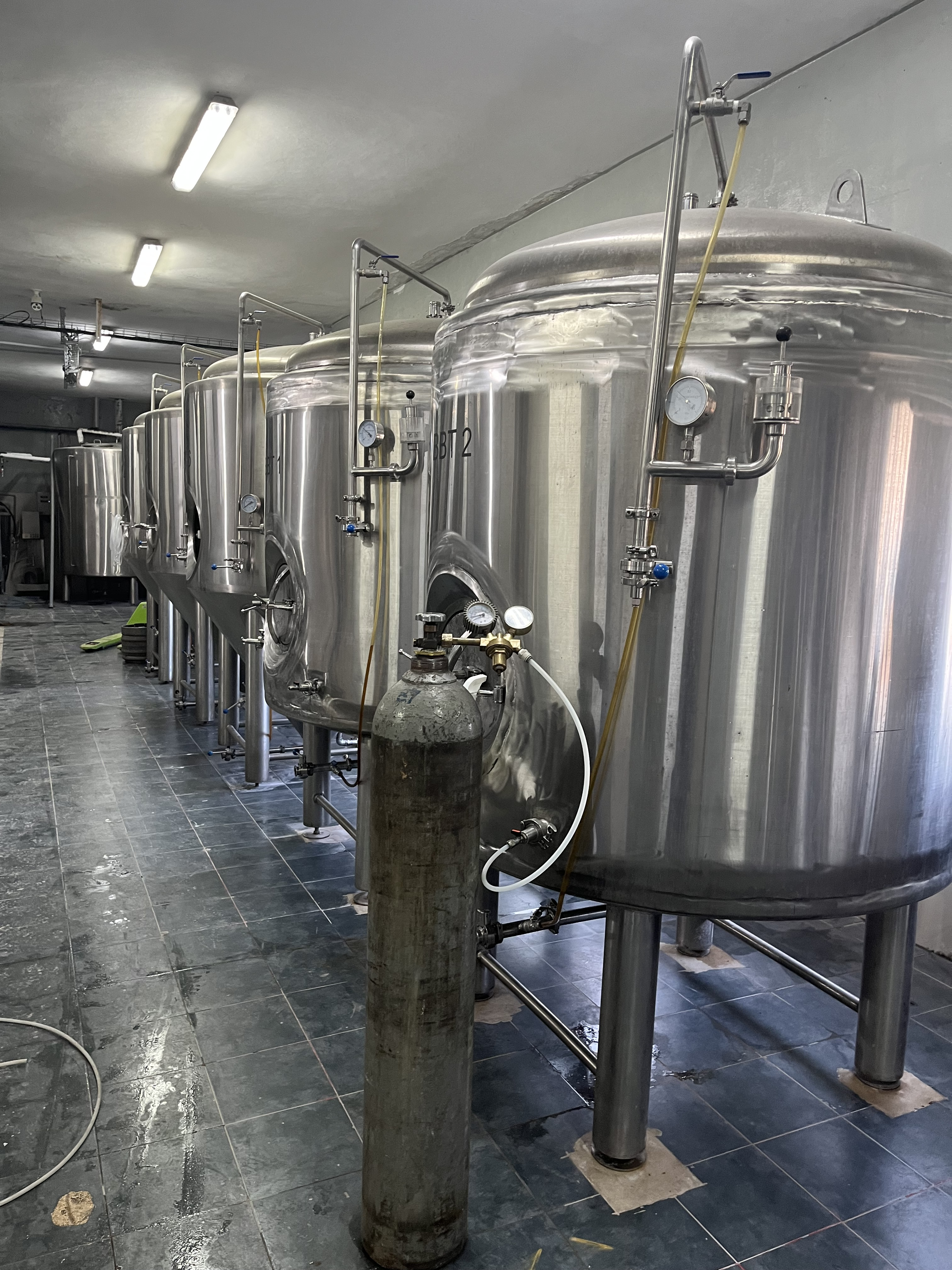
Birzeit Brewery, in the city of Birzeit, in the West Bank, is the second brewery in the State of Palestine

Though established in 2013, Birzeit Brewery only began commercial sales of its signature line, called Shepherds Beer, in July 2015 due to challenges associated with operating in the occupied West Bank and importing equipment and supplies through Israel, including unpredictable delays in acquiring permits.

Birzeit also faced licensing issues with the Palestinian Authority, which initially rejected the design of its beer bottle label featuring the drawing of a shepherd on the premise that it was a depiction of Jesus and thus blasphemous. It took Sayek three months to persuade the authorities otherwise.

In 2016, Birzeit decided to remove a booth it had set up at the Birzeit heritage festival following criticism from a local Muslim preacher for promoting alcohol consumption. The brewery withdrew to avoid controversy, but later organised its own event, the first Shepherds Beer Festival, in the town.

This became an annual event, and the second annual Shepherds Beer Festival, hosted by the brewery in August 2017 in Beit Sahour, a Palestinian Christian suburb of Bethlehem, drew 7,000—8,000 visitors across two days. It has been held in August again each year ever since.

As of 2017, the local permitting hurdles faced by the business had been overcome and Shepherds Beer was being sold in both the Palestinian territories and Israel, and being exporting to Italy, Chile and the United States.

== Beers ==
The Shepherds Beer line includes a blonde Czech-style Pilsner, an English-type amber ale and an Irish stout. It also produces seasonal beers, one example being a small batch of "berry wheat beer" it brewed using four types of berries harvested from farms around Birzeit. The brewery has stated its plans for a non-alcoholic beer line and is also considering the production of other alcoholic beverages.

== Local challenges ==
As a Palestinian brewery in the Israeli-occupied West Bank, Birzeit faces a number of common challenges for such operations, including restrictions on construction, imports and exports, as well as access to vital resources like water.

This latter problem in particular led Sayej to design an in-house water treatment system to recycle water for cleaning and other auxiliary uses in the brewery. The brewery also collects rainwater for such purposes.

Sayej has also experimented with growing his own hops for the brewery with a view to producing a single-origin Palestinian IPA. He has produced limited quantities of hops using hydroponics that the brewery has used to make small batches of beers for special events.

== See also ==
- Beer in Palestine
- Palestinian cuisine
