= Taybeh Brewery =

1994 Palestinian brewery in Taybeh, West Bank, State of Palestine

Coordinates: 31°57′10.5″N 35°17′59.3″E

- Taybeh beer logo

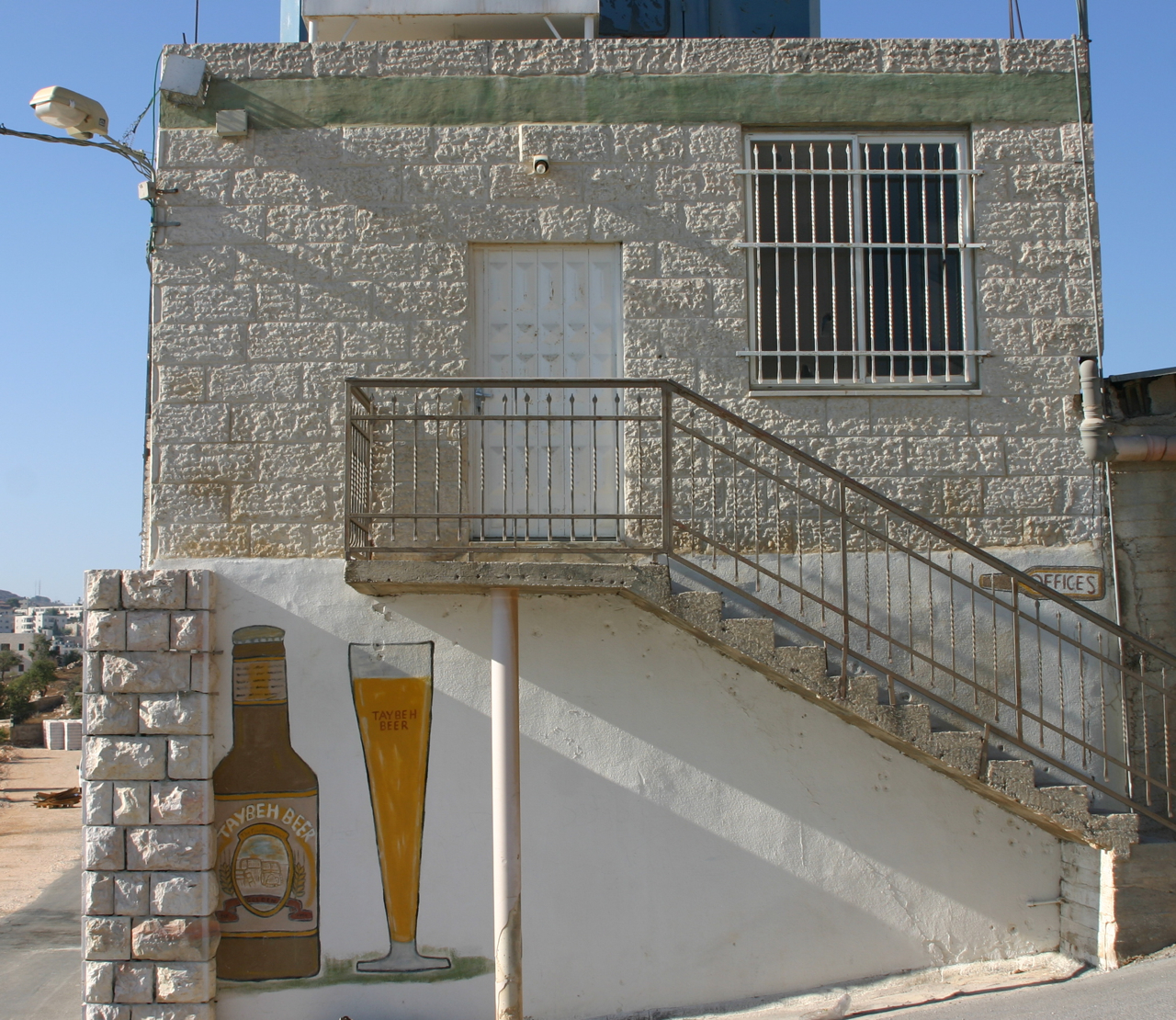
- Interactive map of Taybeh Brewery
- Location: Taybeh, Palestine
- Opened: 1994; 32 years ago
- Key people: Nadim Khoury

Taybeh Brewery (Arabic: مخمرة الطيبة, lit. "Delicious Brewery") is a brewery founded in 1994 in the West Bank village of Taybeh, 35 kilometres (22 mi) north of Jerusalem, by Nadim Khoury and his brother David, members of the local Palestinian Christian community. It is considered to be the first Palestinian brewery and the first microbrewery in the whole Middle East, having predated the first Israeli microbrewery by about ten years.

Since its establishment, a number of other notable Middle Eastern microbreweries have been established, including Birzeit Brewery, also in Palestine.

== History ==
Taybeh Brewery was co-founded in 1994, shortly after the signing of the first Oslo Accords in 1993, by Nadim Khoury and his brother David. Their family originated in Taybeh, but they grew up in Brookline, Massachusetts, where their family ran a liquor store. In the 1980s, as a college student at Hellenic College in Brookline, Nadim began making his own beer in the basement of the dorm where he lived. He subsequently took up formal studies in brewing at UC Davis in California, eventually graduating with a master's degree.

The establishment of the Taybeh Brewery was funded with $1.5 million of the Khoury family's own money, as banks refused to lend to them, and the family got the seed capital for Taybeh by selling their property in Brookline. The brewery produced its first beer in 1995 and has since developed a global following.

The idea of a Palestinian brewery was controversial in 1994, as Palestinian society is predominantly Muslim, and alcohol consumption is culturally disapproved of, but Palestinian President Yasser Arafat was an early supporter of the brewery on the grounds that it would help break Palestine's dependence on alcohol imported from Israel.

Arafat's support is believed to have been instrumental in enabling the brewery to be established. However, Taybeh beer was also certified as kosher by a rabbi from the Ofra settlement shortly after its founding, and 70% of its sales before the outbreak of the Second Intifada in 2000 were to Israelis. Taybeh depended on imports that passed through Israel for its equipment and ingredients.

In response to the Intifada and its associated violence, Israel began establishing checkpoints and erected the West Bank barrier fence and wall between the port of Ashdod, where Taybeh's hops, barley, and yeast were imported from, and the brewery. Israeli checkpoints and inspections made it extremely difficult for Taybeh to import raw materials. On one occasion, Taybeh was charged $6,000 in costs for hold-ups at the port of Ashdod on a $20,000 shipment of bottles. In 2002, Nadim stated:

"[The Israelis] hold our shipment just to give us a hard time, to check if these are not weapons, to check them for security check-ups. They even take a sample of the bottles. They inspect them and they bring them back and charge us every time for security check ups, for opening these containers."

The barriers also complicated the shipping of beer to customers in Israel and abroad, cutting off exports to Jordan and lengthening the travel time from the brewery to Jerusalem from 20 minutes to several hours. Tourism in Israel and Palestine also fell sharply because of the violence, which was a major problem for Taybeh because many of its customers were foreigners. As a result, sales plunged, with revenue falling by over 90% by 2002, and Khoury had to lay off all 12 of his employees.

As a stopgap measure to keep the brewery in business, Taybeh sold olive oil produced by a local church in Taybeh village to a company in Belgium. The brewery recovered somewhat after the Intifada ended in 2005, growing to six employees, but it was also dealt a major blow in 2007 when Islamist political party and militant group Hamas took control of the Gaza Strip and ended the sale of alcohol there.

Since 2007, Taybeh has continued to recover and expand and as of 2018 its beer is sold in at least 12 countries. However, it continues to face obstacles imposed by the Israeli occupation of the West Bank and control of the ports. Taybeh continues to rely on Israeli ports for importing raw materials and exporting finished beer. Supplies that take two weeks to get from Europe to Israel can take another three months to reach the brewery in the West Bank.

The high cost of shipping due to checkpoints and other constraints has made it difficult for Taybeh to compete, and its beer kegs have been cut open by the Israeli authorities on occasion and their containers sent back. A disparity in water access in the West Bank brought about by continued Israeli settlement expansion means that Taybeh has concerns about its future water supply. Although it is able to use water from a local spring, the business expects the water scarcity to limit its international expansion.

== Milestones ==
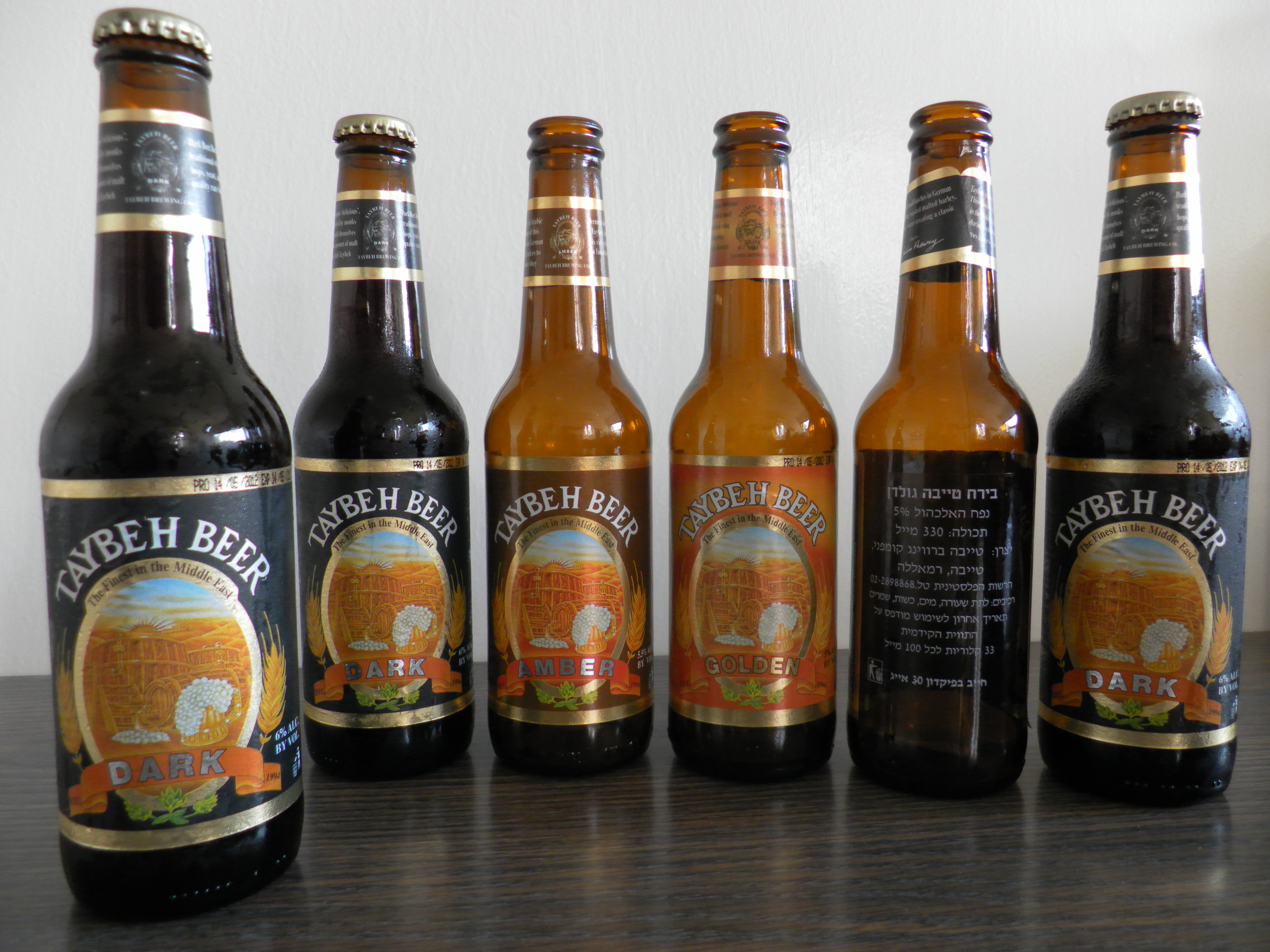
Bottled Taybeh beer. Dark, Amber, and Golden varieties are shown.

In 1997, Taybeh beer became the first Palestinian product to be franchised in Germany, where it was brewed and bottled for sale in Europe. Taybeh beer is also exported to Sweden and Japan, and is sold in the United Kingdom.

In 2005, an annual Oktoberfest-style beer festival was launched. Dubbed the Taybeh Beer Festival, it opens in the beginning of October.

In 2008, an Australian named Lara van Raay produced a documentary called Palestine, Beer and Oktoberfest Under Occupation, which focuses on the Taybeh Brewery and the Khoury family.

The Taybeh Brewing Company was highlighted in the January/February 2010 Issue of the fine beverage publication Mutineer Magazine.

In 2012, Taybeh opened a winery, which produces Syrah, Merlot, and Cabernet Sauvignon red wines. The winery, which was established with the help of an Italian winemaker, has been run by Nadim Khoury's son Canaan since he graduated from Harvard in 2013 with an engineering degree.

In 2017, Taybeh beer and wine became available in the United States for the first time. The first American store to sell Taybeh was Foley's, the liquor store that the Khoury family ran before founding Taybeh Brewery, though their beer is sold in other stores around Massachusetts and in Rhode Island. Taybeh had been attempting to sell their beer in America since at least 2005, when it was first approved for sale in the US, but have faced obstacles to doing so. One barrier to Taybeh's entry into the US was that the Alcohol and Tobacco Tax and Trade Bureau's rules against "false or misleading statements on labels" prevented them from branding their beer as "Product of Palestine," as they do in other countries. As a result, Taybeh is sold in the US as "Product of the West Bank."

As of 2018, Taybeh is still available in Israeli bars and clubs. However, sale of it and other Palestinian beers remains controversial, to the point where some on the Israeli political right have called for boycotting it. As of 2017, 60% of Taybeh's sales are in Israel and the West Bank, down from 70% in the West Bank alone in 2010.

== Beers ==
As of October 2018, there are six varieties of Taybeh Beer: Golden, Light, Dark, Amber, Non-alcoholic, and White. Golden, which is 5% alcohol by volume (ABV) is the original variety. The Dark and Light beers (6% and 3.5% ABV, respectively) were introduced for the 2000 celebrations in the Holy Land. The Dark variety follows a classic style of the way monks brewed beer in the Middle Ages in order to fortify themselves during their fasting. An Amber variety (5.5% ABV) was launched in 2007. A non-alcoholic beer variety was introduced in 2008 specifically for the local Palestinian Muslim market. Taybeh White (3.8% ABV), a Belgian-style wheat beer, was launched in 2013.

== See also ==
- Beer in Palestine
- Palestinian cuisine
