= Guneeta Singh Bhalla =

Indian historian

- Born: India
- Education: University of Florida (Ph.D.)
- Occupations: Physicist; Historian
- Known for: Founder of The 1947 Partition Archive
- Website: 1947partitionarchive.org

Guneeta Singh Bhalla is an Indian-American physicist and historian, best known as the founder and executive director of The 1947 Partition Archive, a non-profitable organization dedicated to preserving firsthand accounts of the Partition of India in 1947.

== Early life and education ==
Bhalla was born in India and spent part of her childhood in Punjab before moving to the United States, where accounts of her paternal grandmother's flight from Lahore to Amritsar during Partition first impressed upon her the human scale of the upheaval. At nineteen, she began informally recording family recollections, an impulse that would later shape her archival work.

Bhalla earned a Ph.D. in condensed matter physics at the University of Florida in 2009; her dissertation explored size effects in phase-separated manganite nanostructures.

== Career in physics ==
Before dedicating herself to oral history, Bhalla was an experimental condensed matter physicist. She completed her postdoctoral work at Lawrence Berkeley National Laboratory and the University of California, Berkeley, where she focused on quantum confinement at interfaces, including oxide heterostructures and domain walls in multiferroics. She and her collaborators were the first to measure a definitive built-in polarization voltage at the Lanthanum aluminate–Strontium titanate interface, by using unique quantum tunnelling and capacitance measurements to characterize the interface. Previously, she showed that electronic currents in phase-separated manganites travel by quantum tunnelling between metallic islands separated by insulating islands.

== The 1947 Partition Archive ==
A 2008 visit to the Hiroshima Peace Memorial convinced Bhalla of the power of survivor testimony in shaping public memory. Returning to India the following year, she began filming interviews with Partition witnesses; by 2011 she left physics to establish The 1947 Partition Archive as a volunteer-run non-profit organization. The organization has since collected over 12,000 oral histories from across the world, preserving the memories of those affected by the 1947 Partition.

== Publications ==
Bhalla has written essays and articles for various publications, including The Diplomat, Business Standard, and Rediff.com. Her research papers have been published in Nature Physics and Physical Review Letters, among other academic journals. In 2024, she and her team published a book titled 10,000 Memories: A Lived History of Partition, Independence, and World War II in South Asia.

== Recognition ==
Her work has been widely recognized for its contribution to preserving South Asian history. In 2023, she was featured in an episode of PBS's Global Perspectives, where she shared her transition from physicist to historian and the global significance of the Partition archive. In 2017, she was nominated for CNN News 18's Indian of the Year award in the Public Service category. That same year, she spoke at TEDx Ashoka about the importance of oral history documentation to understand Partition.
