= Partition Museum, Delhi =

Museum in Delhi, India

- Established: 18 May 2023
- Location: Dara Shukoh Library Cultural Hub, Lothian Road, Old Delhi 110006
- Coordinates: 28.663°N 77.233°E
- Type: Historical museum
- Collections: 1947 archive, oral histories, photographs
- Founder: The Arts And Cultural Heritage Trust (TAACHT)
- Owner: Government of Delhi
- Website: www.partitionmuseum.org

The Partition Museum is a public museum located in the Dara Shukoh Library Building at Dr. B. R. Ambedkar University Delhi, Kashmere Gate Campus Old Delhi, India. Much like its counterpart in Amritsar, this museum aims to bring forward the people's history preceding and succeeding the Partition of India in 1947. The museum was inaugurated on 18 May 2023 by the Delhi Education Minister Atishi, who hails from a family of Partition survivors as well. This is India's second museum dedicated to preserving the stories of individuals or families that witnessed the partition of India.

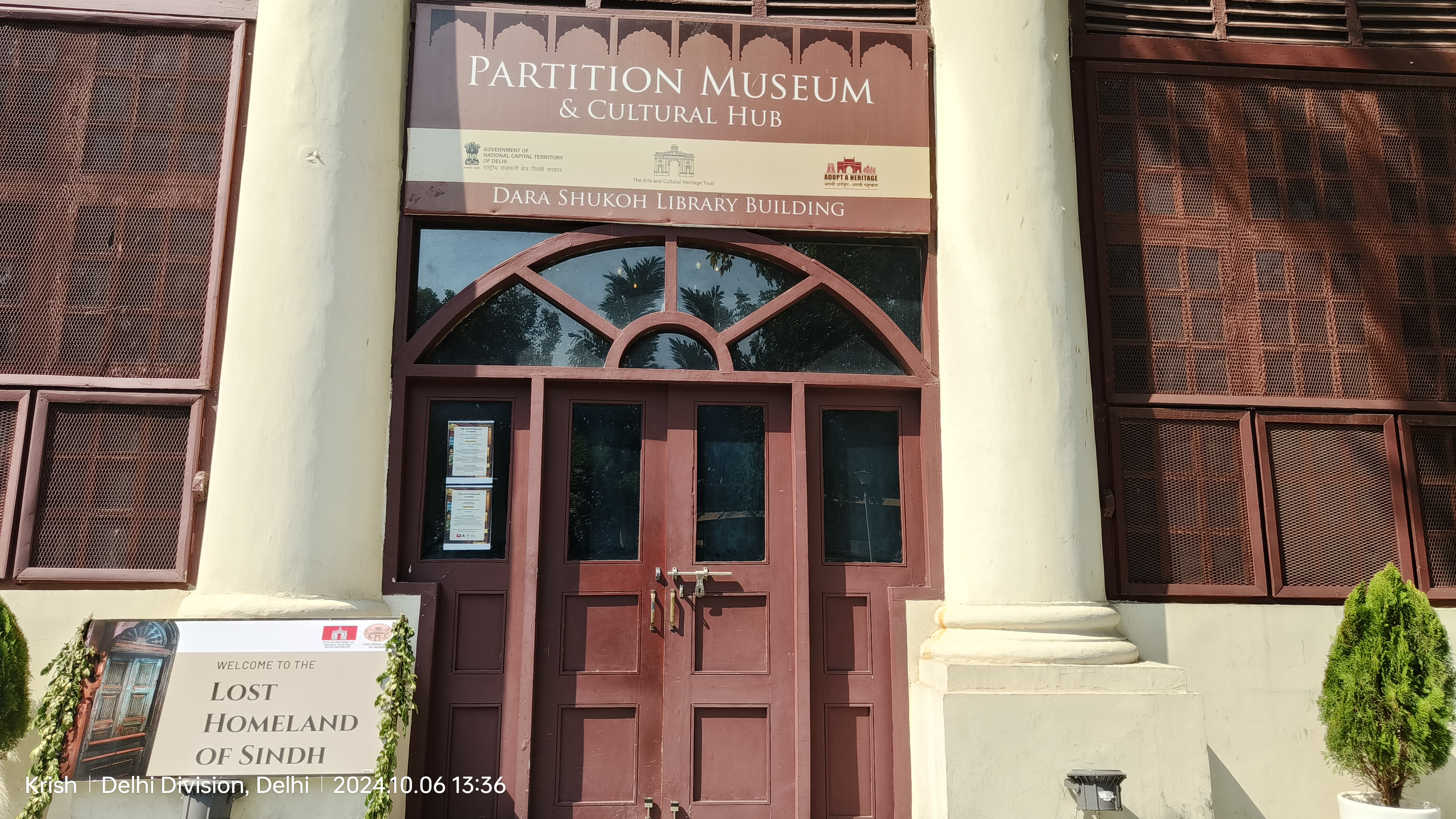
Partition Museum, Delhi

== History ==
The building wherein the museum is presently hosted has its distinctive history. It was once part of the Mughal prince Dara Shukoh's palace. After Shukoh's death, charged of apostasy by prosecutors and executed on the behest of his brother Aurangzeb, and the latter's death, the property was passed on to Bahadur Shah I. Thereafter, it became the residence of one Portuguese lady, Juliana Dias da Costa, who had an important role in the court of Bahadur Shah I. It was then bought by Safdarjung and then became the British Residency of the East India Company for many decades. Eventually, in the twentieth century, it was acquired by the Delhi State Archaeology Department. Most recently, the building was located within the Kashmiri Gate campus of Ambedkar University.

The property was conferred to The Arts and Cultural Heritage Trust (TAACHT) by the Ministry of Culture's "Adopt a Heritage" scheme to develop a Partition Museum emphasising Delhi's heritage, history of migration, and diverse resettlement colonies accommodating many individuals who migrated to Delhi from present-day Pakistan during the partition of India. Various settlements in Delhi such as "Lajpat Nagar, Rajendra Nagar, Patel Nagar, Jangpura, Nizamuddin Extension were originally built for refugees and subsequently gentrified".

Initially, when the building was selected, it was in a deteriorating state and then restored for the purposes of the museum. The present management has preserved the unique blend of Mughal and British architectural styles of the building. The lobby of the building acts both as an introduction to the building's history and provides an introduction to the museum.

== Collections ==
The museum is divided into six galleries.

1. Towards Independence and Partition
2. Migration
3. Refuge
4. Rebuilding Home
5. Rebuilding Relationships
6. Hope and Courage

Each gallery exhibits diverse material objects and artefacts through which the memories of separation have been preserved. Many displayed materials were taken from the Nehru Memorial and National Archive and the archive of artist Amar Nath Sahgal. Various other families contributed memories, collectables, family heirlooms, and funds as well for the establishment of the museum. Objects ranging from tents and bed posts to locks and musical equipment such as sitars can be found in the museum alongside various kinds of photographs and artworks sourced from public and private individuals. Each of these objects and photographs has a story to tell which in turn narrates the shared past of the people.

A donated lock and key had secured a family's trunk during their departure from Muzaffargarh. Another family donated a National Bank of Sialkot passbook after being unable to access their money on reaching India.

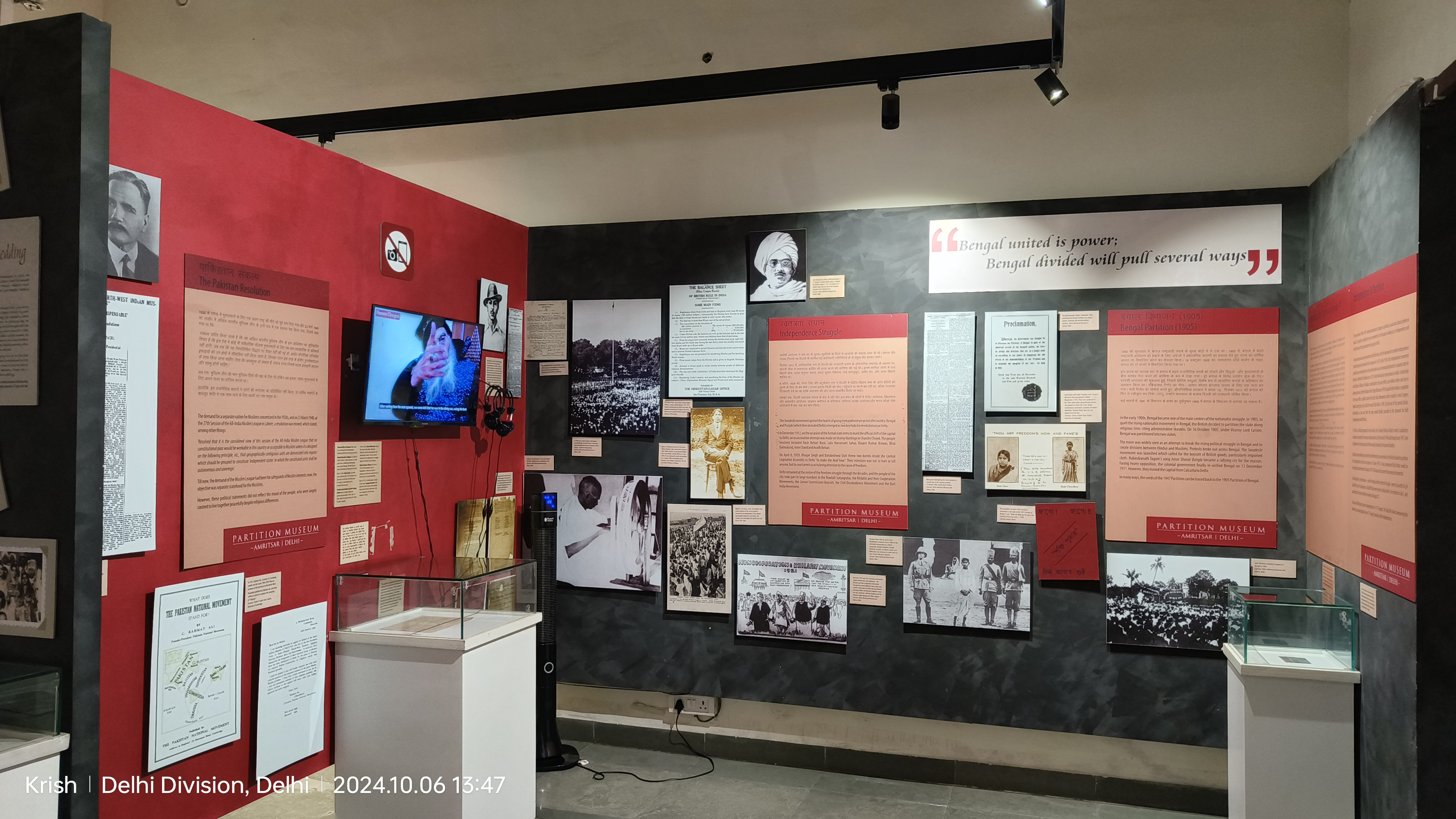
View of a gallery of Partition Museum, Delhi

== See also ==
- Dara Shikoh
- The Partition Museum, Amritsar
- The 1947 Partition Archive
- Kolkata Partition Museum
