= 10,000 Memories =

2024 book

10,000 Memories: A Lived History of Partition, Independence and World War II in South Asia
- Editor: Guneeta Singh Bhalla; Fakhra Hasan; Fahad Nahvi; Udayan Das; Erin Riggs; Amardip Kumar Singh
- Language: English
- Subject: Oral history of the 1947 Partition of India; World War II in South Asia
- Genre: Non-fiction
- Publisher: The 1947 Partition Archive
- Publication date: 8 August 2024
- Publication place: United States
- Media type: Print (hardcover)
- Pages: 582
- ISBN: 979-8-9867479-0-3

10,000 Memories: A Lived History of Partition, Independence and World War II in South Asia is a 2024 non-fiction compendium of oral histories produced by the non-profit, The 1947 Partition Archive. The 582-page first volume, edited by founder Guneeta Singh Bhalla with Fakhra Hasan, Fahad Nahvi, Udayan Das, Erin Riggs, and Amardip Kumar Singh, was published in Berkeley, California on 8 August 2024. Drawing on thousands of witness testimonies recorded across the South Asian subcontinent, the book reconstructs the intertwined wartime and decolonization experiences that led to the 1947 Partition of India.

== Contents ==
10,000 Memories is printed as a double-sided "eastern" and "western" book: one cover opens in Kandahar, Afghanistan, while the reverse begins in Yangon, Myanmar, with the narratives meeting in the Deccan Plateau. More than 1,000 archival photographs accompany 400 condensed life-story summaries, each framed by contextual sidebars on military campaigns, refugee corridors and political negotiations. The editors emphasize regional diversity while linking local memories to larger theatres such as the China-Burma-India front and the Bengal famine.

== Reception ==
Critics greeted the volume as an accessible bridge between scholarship and family memory. Prasun Chaudhuri of The Telegraph characterized a pre-launch reading in Kolkata as "a reminder of how Partition shaped the electoral choices of a generation for their entire lifetime". Times of India highlighted the book's "pan-South Asian scope" and the inclusion of 400 first-person narratives.

An event at SOAS University of London praised the book for offering "a unique dimension and insight into the history of Partition ... unlike any previously written." The University of Florida International Center launch event hailed the work as "the first and largest pan-South Asian oral-history survey ever conducted."
