= Partition Museum =

- Logo

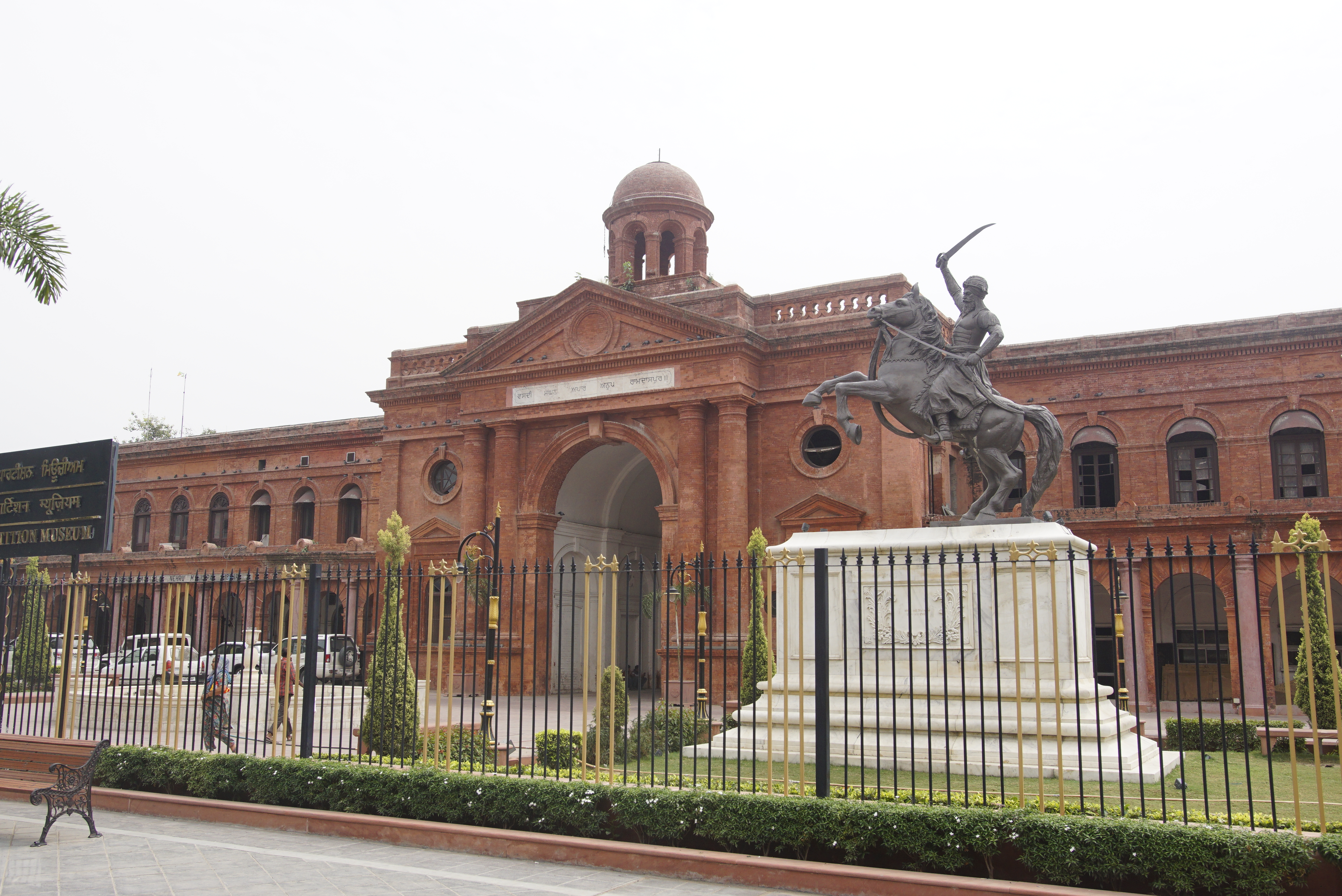
- View of Partition Museum
- Established: 25 August 2017
- Location: Town Hall, Katra Ahluwalia, Amritsar, Punjab, India
- Coordinates: 31.6258°N 74.8787°E
- Type: Museum
- Collections: 1947 archives, oral histories
- Founders: The Arts and Cultural Heritage Trust (TAACHT)
- Chairperson: Kishwar Desai
- Owner: Government of Punjab
- Parking: Limited
- Website: www.partitionmuseum.org

The Partition Museum is a public museum located in the town hall of Amritsar, Punjab, India. The museum aims to become the central repository of stories, materials, and documents related to the post-partition riots that followed the division of British India into two independent dominions: India and Pakistan. The museum also focuses on the history of the “anti-colonial movement, the Jallianwala Bagh massacre, the Komagata Maru incident, the All India Muslim League and the Indian National Congress, and the journey of resilience and recuperation for women”. The building wherein the museum is located in Amritsar was also “once the British headquarters and a jail”. The museum was inaugurated on 25 August 2017.

== History ==
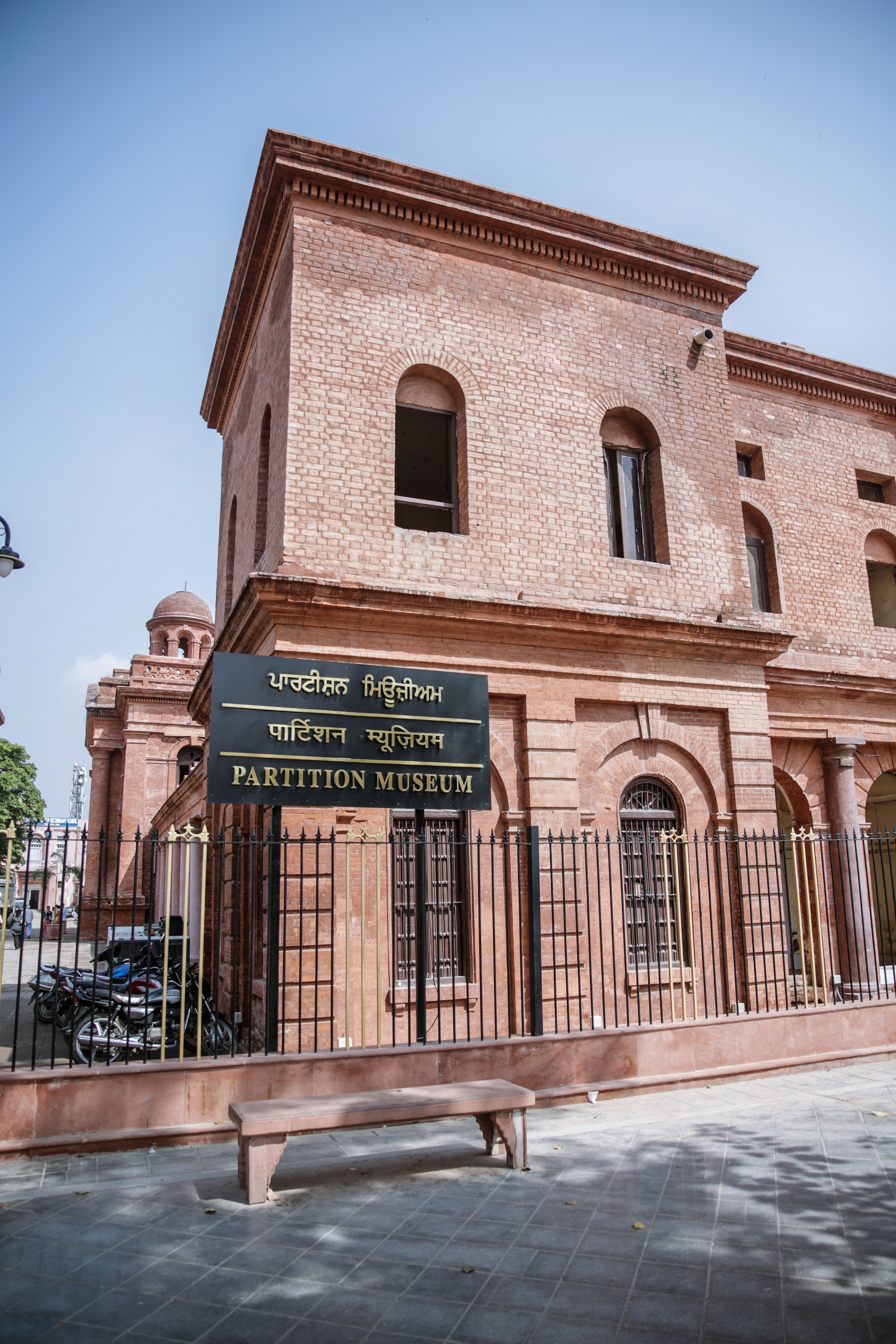
Partition museum in Amritsar, Punjab

In 1947, British India was divided into India and Pakistan. The partition lines, drawn on a map by the British lawyer Cyril Radcliffe, divided the province of Punjab and Bengal into two parts on the basis of religion. As a result, millions of people found themselves on the wrong side of the border overnight. According to various estimates, more than 800,000 Muslims, Hindus, and Sikhs were killed in the riots that followed the partition between August 1947 to January 1948. Additionally, more than 1,400,000 people became refugees.

The Government of Punjab founded this museum with The Arts and Cultural Heritage Trust of the United Kingdom as a way to memorialize those who were affected by the partition. Therefore, the museum documents the catastrophic history of migration, loss of life and livelihood through testimonies of the first-generation partition survivors and their lived experiences.

Based on extensive oral testimonies from individuals who witnessed the partition, the experiences of their family members, and material memories (the various objects that individuals managed to migrate with - be it jewelleries, clothes, or cooking utensils), the museum provides a platform for the younger generations to know the aftermath of what has been dubbed as one of the cataclysmic events in the recent history of the Indian subcontinent. The museum acts as a reminder of not only the millions of individuals who lost their lives owing to violence as a result of the Partition of India but also one of resilience as many individuals despite finding themselves in challenging circumstances turned their lives around and contributed in their own ways towards the cause of nation-building.

Mallika Ahluwalia, the Managing Trustee and co-founder of the Partition Museum, has documented some of the notable stories of individuals in her book titled Divided by Partition, United by Resilience: 21 Inspirational Stories from 1947 (2018).

== Collections ==
The museum is divided into fourteen galleries: "Why Amritsar?, Punjab, Resistance (1900-1929), The Rise (1930-1945), Differences (1946), Prelude to Partition, Boundaries, Independence, Borders, Migrations, Divisions, Refuge, and Hope". With a "linear and chronological narrative" structure, the museum seeks to provide a history of the partition and why it took place. In doing so, the museum focuses on the people's perspectives and their experiences of living through that time in history. These galleries comprise “oral history accounts, object biographies, photographs, music and audio, contemporary artwork, and various unique exhibits such as a jail cell, train platform, riot-hit house, metal saw, a well, hanging banners, refugee tent, and a tree of hope (paper leaves on barbed wire, a participatory installation)”.

== See also ==
- Partition Museum, Delhi
- The 1947 Partition Archive
- Kolkata Partition Museum
- Partition of Bengal
- Partition Horrors Remembrance Day
