= The 1947 Partition Archive =

Indian and American oral history initiative

- Location: Berkeley, California, United States
- Type: Oral history initiative
- Established: 2011; 15 years ago
- Collection size: 12,000+ video interviews (as of June 2025)
- Website: 1947partitionarchive.org

The 1947 Partition Archive is a 501(c)(3) non-profit oral history organization in Berkeley, California, and a registered trust in Delhi, India founded by Guneeta Singh Bhalla that collects, preserves, and shares first-hand accounts of the Partition of India in 1947.

Given the sensitive relationship between Partition stories and Hindu–Muslim relations, a small portion of the Archive's collection has been released to the public via online streaming in collaboration with Stanford University Libraries. Currently, online access to the full collection of stories is granted on a case-by-case basis to scholars for academic research. Access to the full collection is also available to the public by appointment at The 1947 Partition Archive's headquarters.

On July 27, 2021, the organization collaborated with the City of Berkeley, California, to declare June 3 as the Partition Remembrance Day because it was on this day in 1947 that the viceroy declared the Mountbatten Plan to divide India. On August 8, 2024, the organization released its book, 10,000 Memories: A Lived History of Partition, Independence and World War II in South Asia, featuring nearly 300 oral testimonies and 1,000 photographs illustrating the voices of the partition survivors spread across various countries in South Asia and elsewhere.

== History ==
The organization started in 2010 when Dr Guneeta Singh Bhalla began recording video interviews with elder Partition witnesses throughout the San Francisco Bay Area and was formalized in 2011. The creation of the 1947 Partition Archive was inspired by the Hiroshima Peace Memorial and the work of various Holocaust memorials.

== Organization ==
The 1947 Partition Archive crowd-sources the collection of Partition witness interviews and conducts free classes, in the form of an online Oral History Workshop, to train volunteers in story-collection and interviewing techniques. As of June 2025, over 12,000 interviews have been collected from more than 450 cities and villages in 14 countries including India, Pakistan, Bangladesh, Nepal, Bhutan, the United States, the United Kingdom, and Israel among others. These interviews are documented in diverse languages and dialects. The Archive's website includes a Story Map that shows the migration patterns of each interviewee.

The Archive's methods of crowdsourcing story collection include Story Scholars, a fellowship program in which individuals are chosen based on academic merit and prior experience to conduct interviews in a selected region, and Citizen Historians, a program in which volunteers can contribute Partition stories to the organization's website. Based on the Archive's digital media platforms, ordinary citizens across the globe are "invited to join free oral history webinar workshops to learn the basic techniques for documenting oral histories, as outlined by the Oral History Association and Baylor University’s open-source online resources." According to Dr Bhalla, "workshop attendees who successfully submit their first oral history interview, and it matches The Archive’s standards with its nine-point criteria, are certified as ‘Citizen Historian’ volunteers."

The Archive has previously offered funding for a one-month immersive residency to university faculties and students to research on Partition, known as the Tata Trusts Partition Archive Research Grants, in association with the Delhi University, Ashoka University, and Guru Nanak Dev University. The primary objective of the Archive is to collect the "vanishing history of Punjab and South Asia through crowdsourced lived memories."

== See also ==
- The Partition Museum, Amritsar
- The Partition Museum, Delhi
- Kolkata Partition Museum
- Opposition to the partition of India
- Violence against women during the partition of India
- Partition of Bengal
