= Birzeit =

Palestinian Christian town north of Ramallah, West Bank

- Municipality type C

Arabic transcription(s)
  - Arabic: بيرزيت
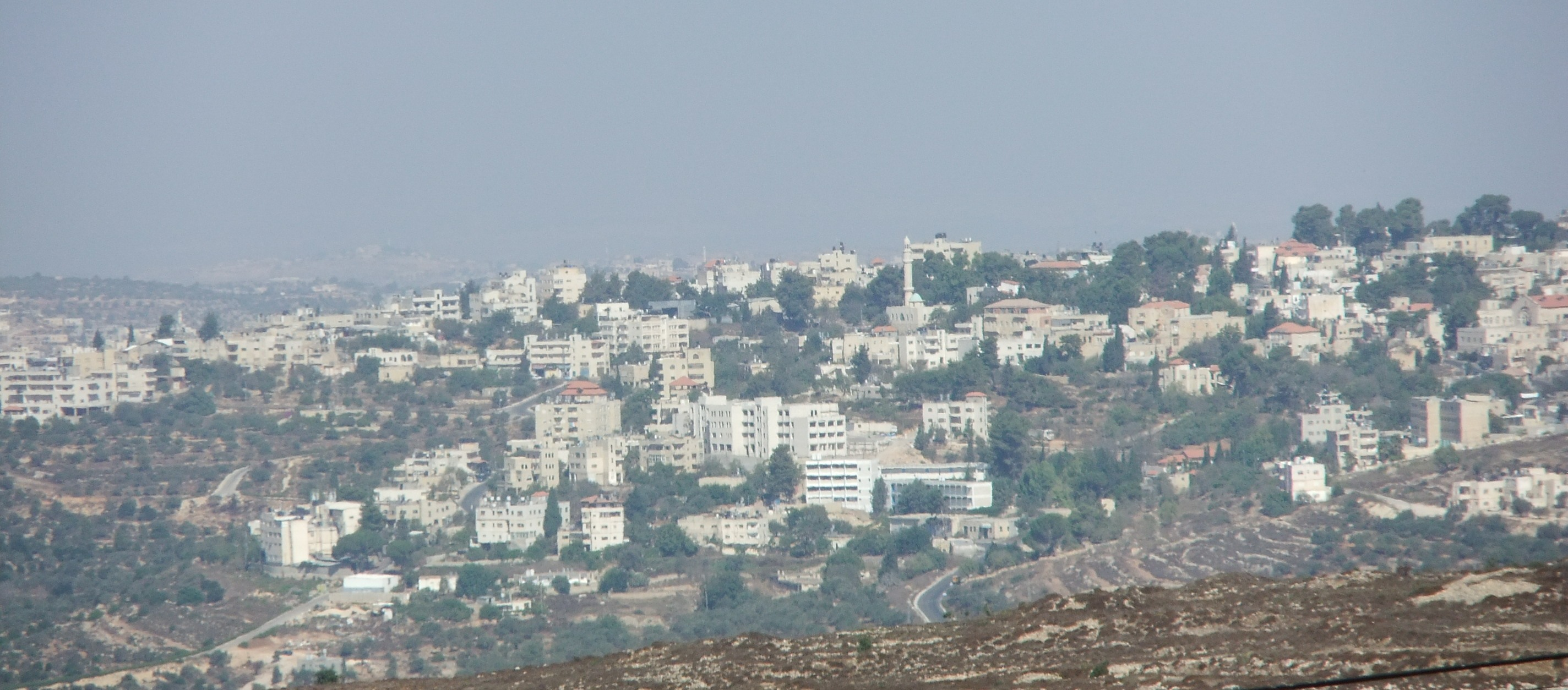

- Location of Birzeit within Palestine Location of Birzeit within the West Bank
- Coordinates: 31°58′20″N 35°11′44″E
- Palestine grid: 169/152
- State: State of Palestine
- Governorate: Ramallah and al-Bireh

Government
  - Type: Municipality
  - Head of Municipality: Ibrahim Al-Sa'di

Area
  - Total: 14.0 km^{2} (5.4 sq mi)
- Elevation: 788 m (2,585 ft)

Population (2017)
  - Total: 5,878
  - Density: 420/km^{2} (1,090/sq mi)

Birzeit (Arabic: بيرزيت), also Bir Zeit (بير زيت), is a Palestinian Christian town north of Ramallah, in the West Bank. Its population in the 2017 census was 5,878. Birzeit is home to Birzeit University and to the Birzeit Brewery.

== Etymology ==
The origins of Birzeit are not documented, but the archaeological remains present in the municipality date back to Roman and Byzantine times. The Arabic name bir zeit, meaning "well of [olive] oil ," likely derives from those periods, as olive oil was traditionally stored in wells dug in the ground. Six of these wells still remain in the historic center of the town, although they are currently disused.

== Location ==
Bir Zeit is located 7.5 kilometers (4.7 mi) north of Ramallah. It is bordered by Jifna and Ein Siniya to the east, 'Atara to the north, Burham, Kobar and Al-Zaytouneh to the west, and Abu Qash to the south.

== History ==
Sherds from the Iron Age II, Hellenistic, Roman, Byzantine and Mamluk eras have been found.

West of the town, at Khirbat Bir Zait, sherds have been found from Iron Age I to the early Ottoman era, with most of them dating back to Iron Age II. The Iron Age ruins span the peak and western slope, while the medieval remnants cluster near the sizable building on the eastern slope. Here are the remains of a building which have been dated to the Crusader era. Guérin first noted the remains of a buildings 50 paces on each side. He thought it could be from the Byzantine era or later. The ruin has been identified with the biblical location of Birzaith. It also identified with Bethzetho and Bethzaith, a village mentioned in 1 Maccabees and by Josephus in relation to Judas Maccabeus' war with Bacchides.

=== Ottoman era ===
The village was incorporated into the Ottoman Empire in 1517 with all of Palestine, and in 1596 it appeared in the tax registers under the name of Bir Zayt, as being in the nahiya of Jabal Quds in the liwa of Quds, with a population of 26 households. The inhabitants of the village paid taxes on wheat, barley, olive trees, vineyards, fruit trees, and goats and/or beehives; a total of 6,600 akçe.

In 1838 it was noted as a small Christian village, north-west of Jifna.

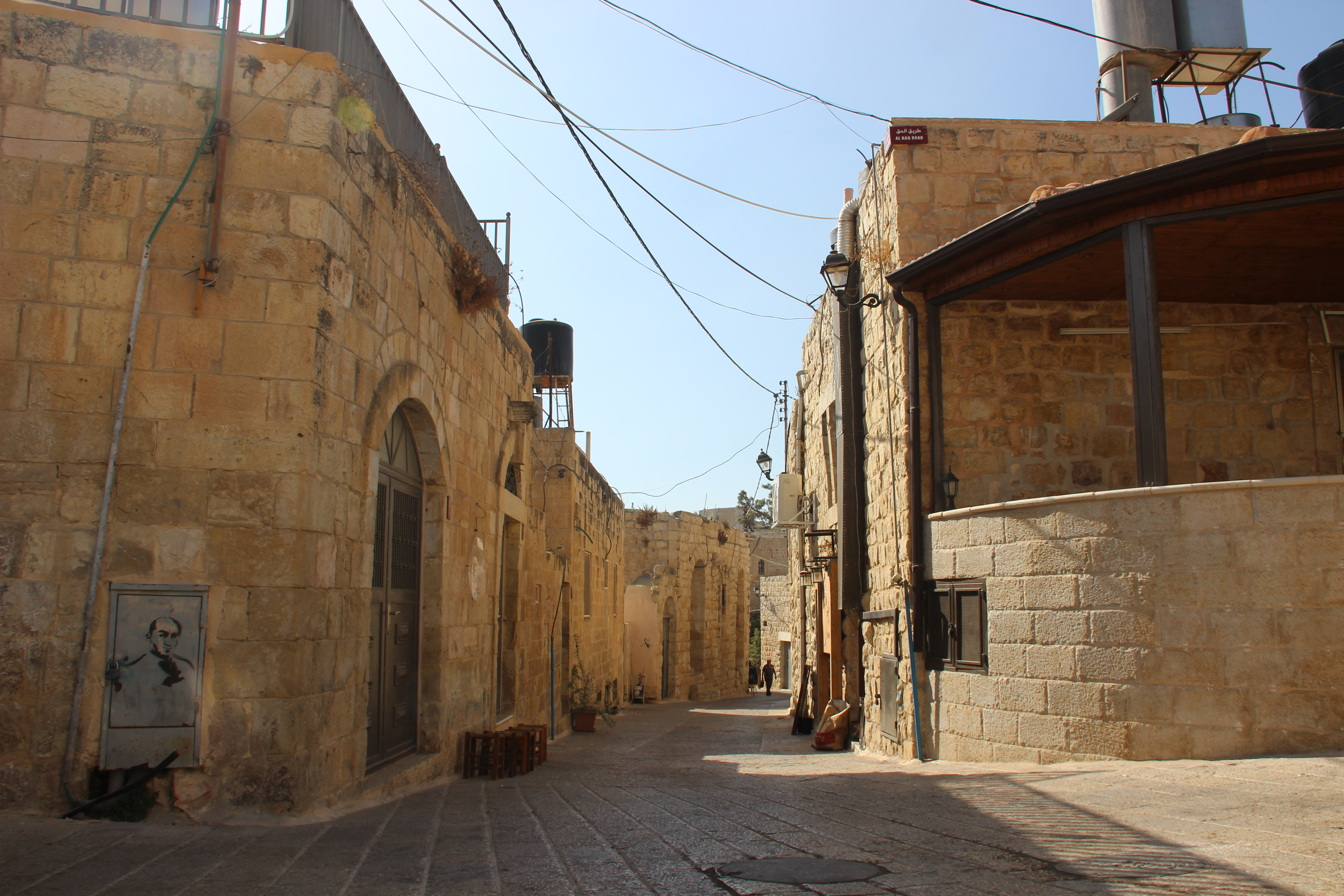
Birzeit's historic core

The French explorer Victor Guérin visited the village in July 1863. He found it to have a population of 1,800 inhabitants, of those 140 were Latin Catholics, the others were "schismatic Greeks" and Muslims. The Catholic parish was administered by a young French missionary, Father Joly. The irrigated gardens were well grown, and the soil naturally fertile. It abounded in vines, figs and pears. He also noted some beautiful walnut trees.

Socin, citing an official Ottoman village list compiled around 1870, noted that Bir Zet as having 73 houses and a male population of 250. Of this, 75 men in 20 houses were Muslim, while 175 men in 53 houses were "Latin" Christian.

In 1882, the Palestine Exploration Fund (PEF) Survey of Western Palestine (SWP) described Bir Zeit as "a Christian village of moderate size, containing a Greek Church and a Latin Church, with a well to the north, and olives round it." The red-tiled roof of the Latin Church on top of the ridge was a conspicuous feature in the landscape.

In 1896 the population of Bir ez-zet was estimated to be about 786 Christians and 192 Muslims.

In 1906, a British missionary of the Church Missionary Society wrote about an outbreak of cholera in Birzeit thirty years before that within a week killed 30 people out of a population of 200–300. The epidemic ended when a village elder ordered the entire population to camp in their vineyards.The author felt that the incident was notable "as there was no European hand in it from first to last, and it shows what the Fellahin are capable of under wise and energetic native guidance."

=== British Mandate era ===
In the 1922 census of Palestine conducted by the British Mandate authorities, the village, called Bair Zait, had a total population of 896; 119 Muslims and 777 Christian; 399 Orthodox, 253 Roman Catholics and 125 Anglicans. In the 1931 census, the village had 251 occupied houses and a total population of 1233; 362 Muslims and 871 Christians.

In the 1945 statistics the population was 1,560; 570 Muslims and 990 Christians, while the total land area was 14,088 dunams, according to an official land and population survey. Of this, 6,908 were allocated for plantations and irrigable land, 2,414 for cereals, while 402 dunams were classified as built-up (urban) areas.

=== Jordanian era ===
In the wake of the 1948 Arab–Israeli War, and after the 1949 Armistice Agreements, Birzeit came under Jordanian rule. It was annexed by Jordan in 1950.

The Jordanian census of 1961 found 3,253 inhabitants in Bir Zeit.

=== 1967–present ===
After the 1995 accords, 75.8% of village land was classified as Area B, the remaining 24.2% as Area C.

On 13 January 2026, 21 people from four Palestinian families including 12 children were displaced from Area B on the eastern outskirts of the town following consistent settler attacks linked to outpost built in august 2025.

==== Landmark buildings ====
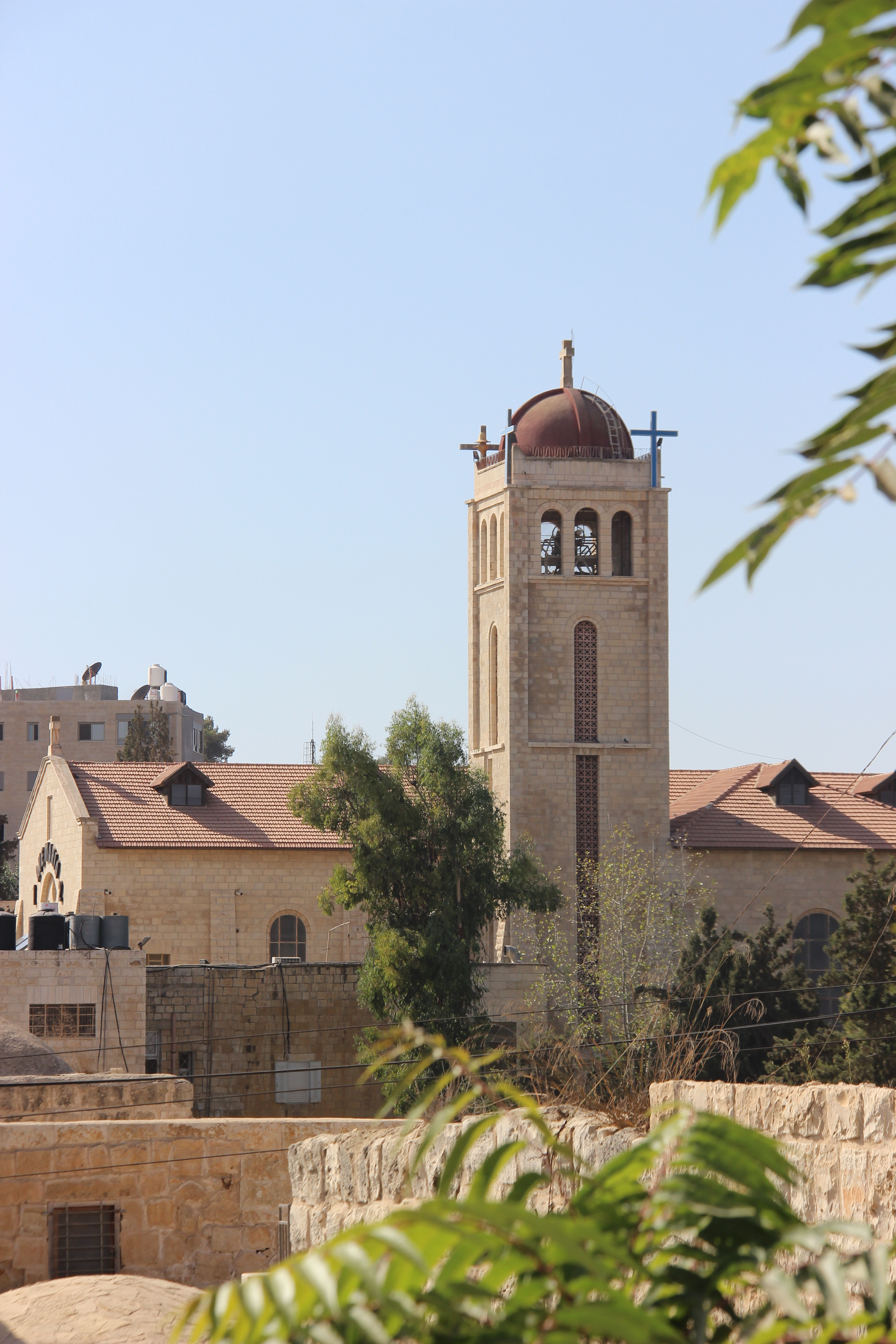
Our Lady Queen of Peace - Guadalupe

The town has 200 historic buildings, including over 100 in the old part of town, some dating back to the Mamluk era. Birzeit University was formerly located there. Dozens of buildings vacated by the university's move to Ramallah were restored, reinvigorating social and economic development.

== Religion ==
A predominantly Christian town, there are three Christian churches in Birzeit – one Orthodox, one Roman Catholic, and one Episcopal/Anglican.

The oldest one is St George Orthodox Church; now the Orthodox Christian community is building another large Orthodox Church, and an Orthodox Christian school that is considered to be the largest in the West Bank.

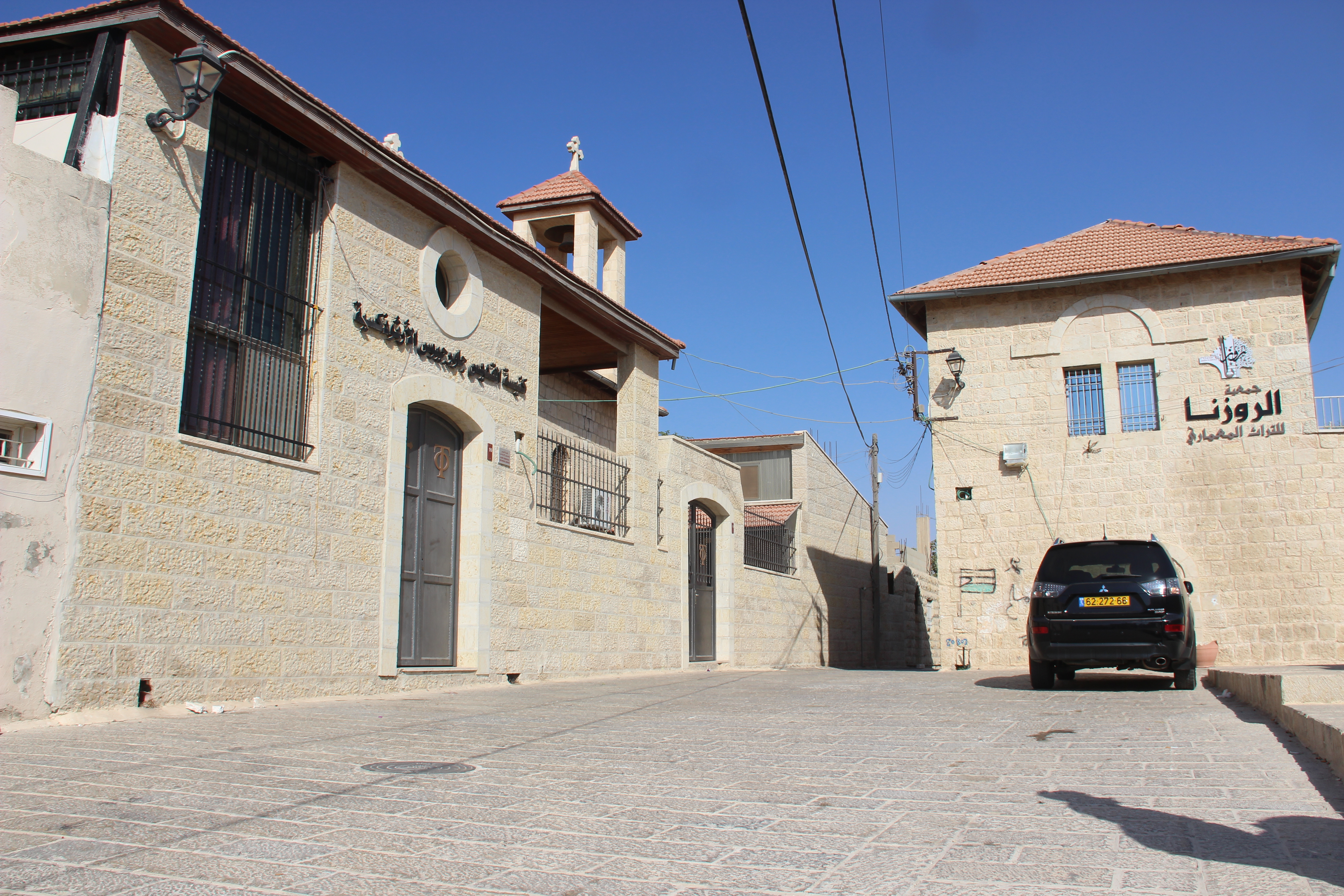
St. George Orthodox Church in Old Birzeit

The Catholic church of Our Lady Queen of Peace - Guadalupe was founded in 1858; it also runs a Catholic high school.

Bir Zeit also has an Episcopal/Anglican church, St. Peter's church.

=== Education and culture ===
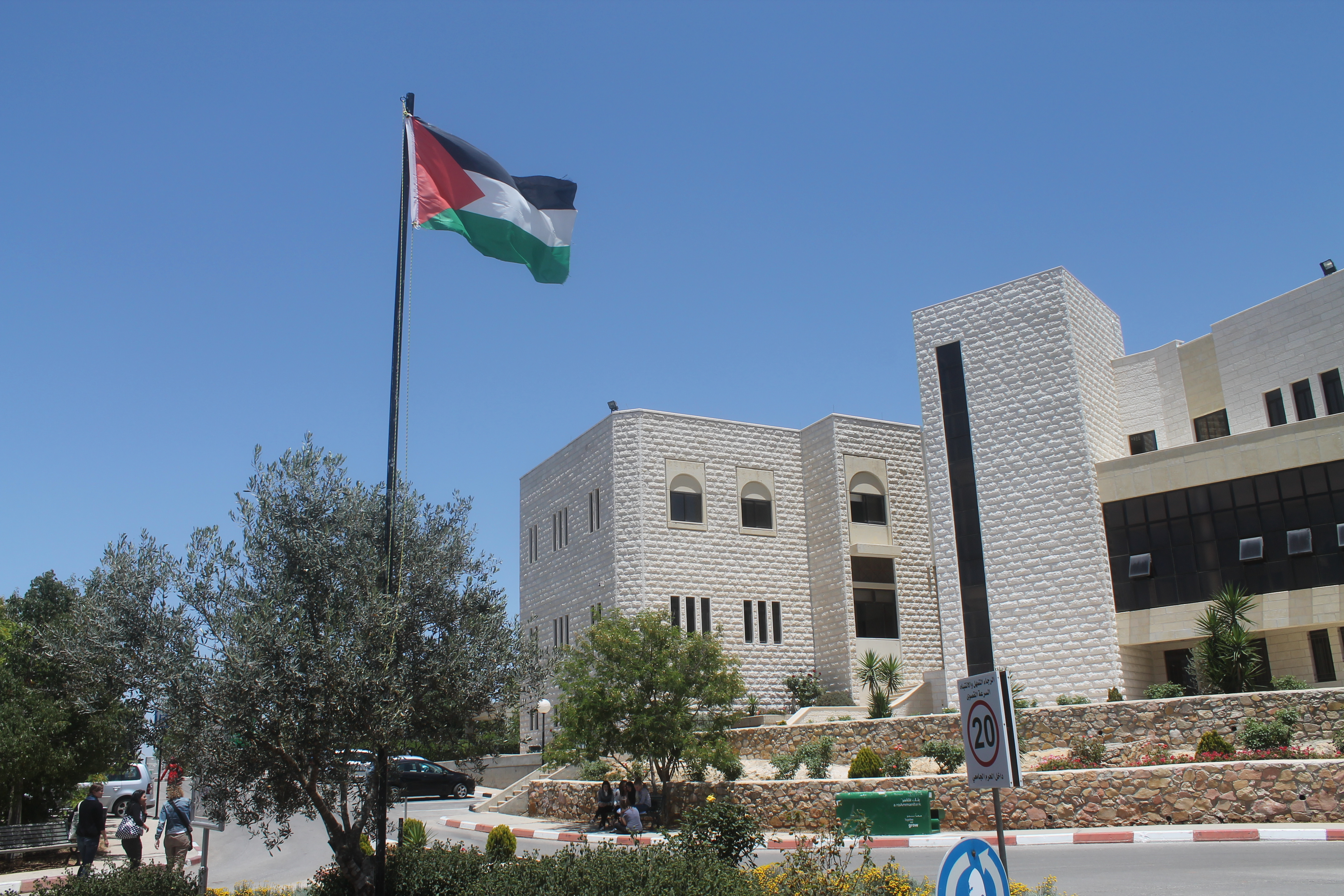
Birzeit University

The annual Maftoul Festival takes place in Birzeit in October. Women from different villages prepare couscous dishes and are judged by a jury of professional chefs. The goal of the festival is to highlight traditional Palestinian food, empower women and promote rural tourism. It is organized by the Rozana Association for Development and Architectural Heritage, the Palestinian Circus School, the Palestinian Ministry of Culture, Birzeit Women's Charitable Society, the Palestinian Chefs Association, Heritage House and Birzeit Club. There is also yearly festival named the heritage week and it is a celebration of different aspects of the villagers life and to it comes many participants to represent their villages customs and traditions from wedding ceremonies to clothes, also in July.

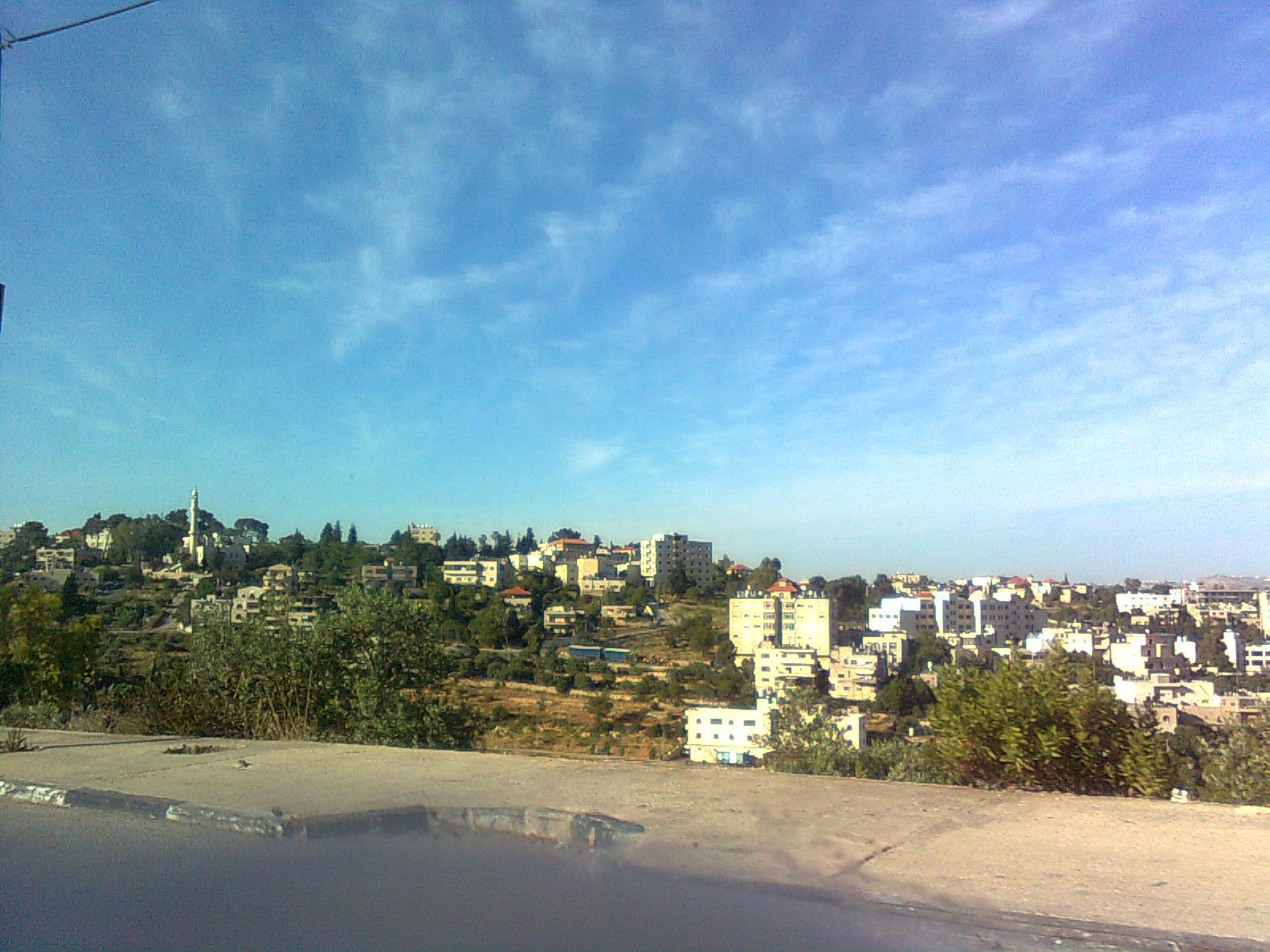

== Notable people ==
- Mai al-Kaila
- Sliman Mansour
- Kamal Nasser
- Sumaya Farhat Naser

== See also ==
- Palestinian Christians

== Bibliography ==
- Barron, J.B., ed. (1923). Palestine: Report and General Abstracts of the Census of 1922. Government of Palestine.
- Conder, C.R.; Kitchener, H.H. (1882). The Survey of Western Palestine: Memoirs of the Topography, Orography, Hydrography, and Archaeology. Vol. 2. London: Committee of the Palestine Exploration Fund.
- Ellenblum, R. (2003). Frankish Rural Settlement in the Latin Kingdom of Jerusalem. Cambridge University Press. ISBN 9780521521871.
- Finkelstein, I.; Lederman, Zvi, eds. (1997). Highlands of many cultures. Tel Aviv: Institute of Archaeology of Tel Aviv University Publications Section. ISBN 965-440-007-3.
- Government of Jordan, Department of Statistics (1964). First Census of Population and Housing. Volume I: Final Tables; General Characteristics of the Population (PDF).
- Government of Palestine, Department of Statistics (1945). Village Statistics, April, 1945.
- Guérin, V. (1869). Description Géographique Historique et Archéologique de la Palestine (in French). Vol. 1: Judee, pt. 3. Paris: L'Imprimerie Nationale.
- Hadawi, S. (1970). Village Statistics of 1945: A Classification of Land and Area ownership in Palestine. Palestine Liberation Organization Research Center.
- Hartmann, M. (1883). "Die Ortschaftenliste des Liwa Jerusalem in dem türkischen Staatskalender für Syrien auf das Jahr 1288 der Flucht (1871)". Zeitschrift des Deutschen Palästina-Vereins. 6: 102–149.
- Hütteroth, W.-D.; Abdulfattah, K. (1977). Historical Geography of Palestine, Transjordan and Southern Syria in the Late 16th Century. Erlanger Geographische Arbeiten, Sonderband 5. Erlangen, Germany: Vorstand der Fränkischen Geographischen Gesellschaft. ISBN 3-920405-41-2.
- Mills, E., ed. (1932). Census of Palestine 1931. Population of Villages, Towns and Administrative Areas. Jerusalem: Government of Palestine.
- Palmer, E.H. (1881). The Survey of Western Palestine: Arabic and English Name Lists Collected During the Survey by Lieutenants Conder and Kitchener, R. E. Transliterated and Explained by E.H. Palmer. Committee of the Palestine Exploration Fund.
- Pringle, D. (1997). Secular buildings in the Crusader Kingdom of Jerusalem: an archaeological Gazetter. Cambridge University Press. ISBN 0521-46010-7.
- Robinson, E.; Smith, E. (1841). Biblical Researches in Palestine, Mount Sinai and Arabia Petraea: A Journal of Travels in the year 1838. Vol. 3. Boston: Crocker & Brewster.
- Schick, C. (1896). "Zur Einwohnerzahl des Bezirks Jerusalem". Zeitschrift des Deutschen Palästina-Vereins. 19: 120–127.
- Socin, A. (1879). "Alphabetisches Verzeichniss von Ortschaften des Paschalik Jerusalem". Zeitschrift des Deutschen Palästina-Vereins. 2: 135–163.
- Toledano, E., 1979, ‘The Sanjaq of Jerusalem in the Sixteenth Century - Patterns of Rural Settlement and Demographic Trends,” in A. Cohen, ed., Jerusalem in the Early Ottoman Period, Jerusalem, 61-92 (in Hebrew).
- Toledano, E. (1984). "The Sanjaq of Jerusalem in the Sixteenth Century: Aspects of Topography and Population". Archivum Ottomanicum. 9: 279–319. Archived from the original on 2016-03-05.
- Wilson, C.T. (1906). Peasant Life in the Holy Land. New York: E. P. Dutton.
